= Italy at the Men's T20 World Cup =

Italy national team performance at T20 World Cup

- Association: Italian Cricket Federation
- Total appearances: 1
- First appearance: 2026: India & Sri Lanka
- Best result: Group stage (2026)
- Most runs: Ben Manenti (138)
- Most wickets: Crishan Kalugamage (7)

The Italy national cricket team is one of the associate members of the International Cricket Council (ICC) and are a part of the ICC Europe, they are nicknamed as Gli Azzurri. The team is administered by the Italian Cricket Federation, which became an affiliate member in 1984, and were granted associate member status in 1995. They made their Twenty20 International (T20I) debut in 2019 against Germany.

This is a record of Italy's results at the Men's T20 World Cup. Italy qualified for their maiden Men's T20 World Cup in 2026 after finishing as runners-up of the 2025 Europe Regional Final, this marked their first appearance at a major ICC tournament. At the tournament, they were eliminated in the group stage but managed to secure a win against Nepal. In their only appearance, they have one win from 4 matches.

== T20 World Cup record ==
Men's T20 World Cup record										Qualification record (Note: WCL Division One served as the qualifier for the 2007 edition.)				
Year	Round	Position	Pld	W	L	T	NR	Ab (Note: Abandoned matches are not counted in the official records.)	Cap	Pld	W	L	T	NR
(South Africa) 2007	Did not enter									Did not enter				
(England) 2009	Did not enter									Did not enter				
(Cricket West Indies) 2010	Did not enter									Did not enter				
(Sri Lanka) 2012	Did not qualify									16	8	8	0	0
(Bangladesh) 2014	Did not qualify									16	10	5	0	1
(India) 2016	Did not qualify									5	3	2	0	0
(United Arab Emirates) (Oman) 2021	Did not qualify									10	8	2	0	0
(Australia) 2022	Did not qualify									6	3	3	0	0
(United States) (Cricket West Indies) 2024	Did not qualify									11	8	2	0	1
(India) (Sri Lanka) 2026	Group stage	14/20	4	1	3	0	0	0	Wayne Madsen (Note: Madsen was replaced as captain by Harry Manenti after sustaining an injury in the first match.)	9	7	1	0	1
(Australia) (New Zealand) 2028	To be determined									To be determined				
Total	0 Titles	1/10	4	1	3	0	0	0	—N/a	73	47	23	0	3

=== Record by opponents ===
Opponent	M	W	L	T+W	T+L	NR	Ab	Win %	First played
England	1	0	1	0	0	0	0	0.00	2026
Nepal	1	1	0	0	0	0	0	100	2026
Scotland	1	0	1	0	0	0	0	0.00	2026
West Indies	1	0	1	0	0	0	0	0.00	2026
Total	4	1	3	0	0	0	0	25.00	—
Source: Last Updated: 19 February 2026

== Tournament results ==
=== 2026 World Cup ===
Ahead of their maiden campaign, Joe Burns, who had led Italy to qualification, was unavailable and replaced as captain by Wayne Madsen. Harry Manenti assumed the role after Madsen was injured in the opening match against Scotland.

Italy lost to Scotland despite Ben Manenti scoring the team’s first T20 World Cup half-century. Their only win came against Nepal, where Crishan Kalugamage took three wickets before Anthony Mosca and Justin Mosca completed an unbeaten chase. Italy then lost to England despite putting up some good fight and then they were defeated by West Indies, finishing with one win from four matches.

Squad and kit

- Wayne Madsen (c)
- Syed Naqvi
- Grant Stewart
- Gian-Piero Meade (wk)
- Jaspreet Singh
- Ali Hasan
- Zain Ali
- Anthony Mosca
- JJ Smuts
- Marcus Campopiano
- Harry Manenti
- Ben Manenti
- Thomas Draca
- Justin Mosca
- Crishan Kalugamage

2026 kit

Results

Group stage (Group C)					Super 8		Semifinal	Final	Overall Result
Opposition Result	Opposition Result	Opposition Result	Opposition Result	Rank	Opposition Result	Rank	Opposition Result	Opposition Result	Overall Result
Scotland; Lost by 73 runs	Nepal; Won by 10 wickets	England; Lost by 24 runs	West Indies; Lost by 42 runs	4	Did not advance				Group stage
Source: ESPNcricinfo

Scorecards

Group stage (Group C)

Match 7
9 February 2026
11:00 UTC+5:30
Scorecard

Scotland; 207/4 (20 overs)	v	Italy; 134 (16.4 overs)
George Munsey 84 (54); Ali Hasan 1/21 (4 overs)		Ben Manenti 52 (31); Michael Leask 4/17 (4 overs)

Scotland won by 73 runs
Eden Gardens, Kolkata
Umpires: Chris Brown (NZ) and Allahuddien Paleker (SA)
Player of the match: Michael Leask (Sco)

- Italy won the toss and elected to field.
- Italy made their T20 World Cup debut.
- This was Scotland's highest innings total in the T20 World Cup (207). This was also the highest score made by an associate nation in the tournament.

Match 17
12 February 2026
15:00 UTC+5:30 (D/N)
Scorecard

Nepal; 123 (19.3 overs)	v	Italy; 124/0 (12.4 overs)
Aarif Sheikh 27 (24); Crishan Kalugamage 3/18 (4 overs)		Anthony Mosca 62* (32)

Italy won by 10 wickets
Wankhede Stadium, Mumbai
Umpires: Donovan Koch (Aus) and Sam Nogajski (Aus)
Player of the match: Crishan Kalugamage (Ita)

- Italy won the toss and elected to field.
- This was the first time Italy and Nepal faced each other in T20Is.
- This was the first World Cup match victory for Italy across all formats.
- This was Italy's first 10-wicket win in T20Is and the eighth overall in T20 World Cups.

Match 29
16 February 2026
15:00 UTC+5:30 (D/N)
Scorecard

England; 202/7 (20 overs)	v	Italy; 178 (20 overs)
Will Jacks 53* (22); Crishan Kalugamage 2/41 (4 overs)		Ben Manenti 60 (25); Jamie Overton 3/18 (4 overs)

England won by 24 runs
Eden Gardens, Kolkata
Umpires: Chris Brown (NZ) and Donovan Koch (Aus)
Player of the match: Will Jacks (Eng)

- England won the toss and elected to bat.
- This was the first time England and Italy faced each other in T20Is.
- England qualified for the Super 8 while Italy and Scotland were eliminated as a result of this match.

Match 37
19 February 2026
11:00 UTC+5:30
Scorecard

West Indies; 165/6 (20 overs)	v	Italy; 123 (18 overs)
Shai Hope 75 (46); Crishan Kalugamage 2/25 (4 overs)		Ben Manenti 26 (21); Shamar Joseph 4/30 (4 overs)

West Indies won by 42 runs
Eden Gardens, Kolkata
Umpires: Adrian Holdstock (SA) and Langton Rusere (Zim)
Player of the match: Shai Hope (WI)

- Italy won the toss and elected to field.
- Jason Holder (WI) played in his 300th international match.

== Records and statistics ==
=== Team records ===
Highest innings totals
Score	Opponent	Venue	Season
178/10 (20 overs)	England	Kolkata	2026
134/10 (16.4 overs)	Scotland	Kolkata	2026
124/0 (12.4 overs)	Nepal	Wankhede	2026
123/10 (18 overs)	West Indies	Kolkata	2026
Last updated: 19 February 2026

=== Most appearances ===
This list consists players with most number of matches at the Men's T20 World Cup. 9 players have played a total of 4 matches. Harry Manenti has captained the side in three matches.

Most matches
Matches	Player	Period
4	9 players	
2	Marcus Campopiano	2026–2026
2	Thomas Draca	2026–2026
2	Jaspreet Singh	2026–2026
1	Wayne Madsen	2026–2026
1	Syed Naqvi	2026–2026
Last updated: 19 February 2026

=== Batting records ===
Most runs
Runs	Player	Mat	Inn	Avg	100s	50s	Period
138	Ben Manenti	4	3	46.00	0	2	2026–2026
105	Justin Mosca	4	4	35.00	0	1	2026–2026
94	Anthony Mosca	4	4	31.33	0	1	2026–2026
59	Grant Stewart	4	3	19.66	0	0	2026–2026
57	Harry Manenti	4	3	19.00	0	0	2026–2026
Last updated: 19 February 2026

Highest individual innings
Score	Player	Opponent	Venue	Year
62*	Anthony Mosca	Nepal	Wankhede	2026
60*	Justin Mosca	Nepal	Wankhede	2026
60	Ben Manenti	England	Kolkata	2026
52	Ben Manenti	Scotland	Kolkata	2026
45	Grant Stewart	England	Kolkata	2026
Last updated: 19 February 2026

Most fifties
Fifties	Player	Period
2	Ben Manenti	2026–2026
1	Anthony Mosca	2026–2026
1	Justin Mosca	2026–2026
Last updated: 19 February 2026

=== Bowling records ===
Most wickets
Wickets	Player	Matches	Avg.	Econ.	4W	5W	Period
3	Crishan Kalugamage	2	16.66	7.14	0	0	2026–2026
2	Ben Manenti	2	14.50	4.83	0	0	2026–2026
2	JJ Smuts	2	30.00	7.50	0	0	2026–2026
2	Ali Hasan	2	27.50	7.85	0	0	2026–2026
1	Jaspreet Singh	1	8.00	5.33	0	0	2026–2026
1	Grant Stewart	2	76.00	10.85	0	0	2026–2026
1	Thomas Draca	1	37.00	18.50	0	0	2026–2026
Last updated: 12 February 2026

Best innings figures
Player	Bowling figures	Opponent	Venue	Year
Crishan Kalugamage	3/18 (4 overs)	Nepal	Wankhede	2026
Ben Manenti	2/9 (4 overs)	Nepal	Wankhede	2026
Crishan Kalugamage	2/25 (4 overs)	West Indies	Kolkata	2026
Ben Manenti	2/37 (4 overs)	West Indies	Kolkata	2026
Crishan Kalugamage	2/41 (4 overs)	England	Kolkata	2026
Last updated: 19 February 2026

=== Partnership records ===
Highest partnerships by runs
Runs	Players	Opposition	Venue	Season
124* (1st wicket)	Justin Mosca & Anthony Mosca	v Nepal	Wankhede	2026
92 (4th wicket)	Justin Mosca & Ben Manenti	v England	Kolkata	2026
73 (4th wicket)	Harry Manenti & Ben Manenti	v Scotland	Kolkata	2026
40 (8th wicket)	Grant Stewart & Jaspreet Singh	v England	Kolkata	2026
32 (2nd wicket)	JJ Smuts & Anthony Mosca	v Scotland	Kolkata	2026
Last updated: 19 February 2026

=== Wicket-keeping records ===
Most dismissals
Dismissals	Player	Matches	Cat.	St.	Period
4	Gian-Piero Meade	4	3	1	2026–2026
Last updated: 19 February 2026

=== Fielding records ===
Most catches
Catches	Player	Matches	Period
6	Harry Manenti	4	2026–2026
3	Anthony Mosca	4	2026–2026
2	Crishan Kalugamage	4	2026–2026
2	Justin Mosca	4	2026–2026
2	JJ Smuts	4	2026–2026
Last updated: 19 February 2026
