= 2026 Men's T20 World Cup squads =

Team captains during a promotional event for the T20 World Cup

The 2026 ICC Men's T20 World Cup was the tenth edition of the ICC Men's T20 World Cup, a biennial world cup for cricket in Twenty20 International (T20I) format organised by the International Cricket Council (ICC). It was co-hosted by the Board of Control for Cricket in India and Sri Lanka Cricket from 7 February to 8 March 2026. A total of twenty teams competed in 55 matches across five venues in India and three in Sri Lanka. Each team was allowed a maximum squad size of 15 players and was required to submit the provisional squad to the ICC by 8 January 2026. The teams were allowed to make changes to the squads until 31 January 2026. Any change after this required permission from the ICC's technical committee.

On 20 December 2025, co-host India became the first team to announce its squad for the tournament. England and Oman announced their squads on 30 December and Afghanistan on 31 December. Australia announced its squad on 1 January 2026; South Africa and Zimbabwe on 2 January; Namibia on 3 January; Nepal on 6 January; New Zealand on 7 January; Ireland on 9 January; the Netherlands on 12 January; Canada on 14 January; Italy on 17 January; Pakistan on 25 January; Scotland and the West Indies on 26 January; and the United Arab Emirates and the United States on 30 January. Co-host Sri Lanka became the final team to announce its squad for the tournament on 2 February.

Players are listed in shirt number order and withdrawn players are placed at the bottom of the table followed by standby players. Given ages are as of 7 February 2026. Withdrawn/dropped players are struck through, and standby players are indicated by a dagger symbol (†). Domestic teams are the recent T20 league teams that the players belonged to before the T20 World Cup and are only listed for countries with available data.

== Group A ==
=== India ===
- Squad announcement date: 20 December 2025
- Coach: (India) Gautam Gambhir

India squad for the tournament
No.	Player	Date of birth	Batting style	Bowling style	IPL team (Note: As of 2025 Indian Premier League)
2	Arshdeep Singh	5 February 1999 (aged 27)	Left-handed	Left-arm medium fast	Punjab Kings
4	Abhishek Sharma	4 September 2000 (aged 25)	Left-handed	Slow left-arm orthodox	Sunrisers Hyderabad
5	Washington Sundar	5 October 1999 (aged 26)	Left-handed	Right-arm off break	Gujarat Titans
9	Sanju Samson (wk)	11 November 1994 (aged 31)	Right-handed	Right-arm off break	Rajasthan Royals
20	Axar Patel (vc)	20 January 1994 (aged 32)	Left-handed	Slow left-arm orthodox	Delhi Capitals
23	Kuldeep Yadav	14 December 1994 (aged 31)	Left-handed	Left arm chinaman	Delhi Capitals
25	Shivam Dube	26 June 1993 (aged 32)	Left-handed	Right-arm medium	Chennai Super Kings
29	Varun Chakravarthy	29 August 1991 (aged 34)	Right-handed	Right-arm leg break	Kolkata Knight Riders
32	Ishan Kishan (wk)	18 July 1998 (aged 27)	Left-handed	Right-arm leg break	Sunrisers Hyderabad
33	Hardik Pandya	11 October 1993 (aged 32)	Right-handed	Right-arm medium fast	Mumbai Indians
35	Rinku Singh	12 October 1997 (aged 28)	Left-handed	Right-arm off break	Kolkata Knight Riders
63	Suryakumar Yadav (c)	14 September 1990 (aged 35)	Right-handed	Right-arm off break	Mumbai Indians
72	Tilak Varma	8 November 2002 (aged 23)	Left-handed	Right-arm off break	Mumbai Indians
73	Mohammed Siraj (Note: Harshit Rana was ruled out of the tournament due to an injury and was replaced by Mohammed Siraj.)	13 March 1994 (aged 31)	Right-handed	Right-arm fast	Gujarat Titans
93	Jasprit Bumrah	6 December 1993 (aged 32)	Right-handed	Right-arm fast	Mumbai Indians
22	~~Harshit Rana~~	22 December 2001 (aged 24)	Right-handed	Right-arm fast	Kolkata Knight Riders

=== Namibia ===
- Squad announcement date: 3 January 2026
- Coach: (Namibia) Craig Williams

Namibia squad for the tournament
No.	Player	Date of birth	Batting style	Bowling style
1	Bernard Scholtz	3 October 1990 (aged 35)	Right-handed	Slow left-arm orthodox
7	Gerhard Erasmus (c)	11 April 1995 (aged 30)	Right-handed	Right-arm off break
12	JJ Smit	10 November 1995 (aged 30)	Right-handed	Left-arm medium fast
19	Jan Nicol Loftie-Eaton	15 March 2001 (aged 24)	Left-handed	Left-arm medium
20	Malan Kruger	12 August 1995 (aged 30)	Right-handed	—N/a
22	Dylan Leicher	3 March 2004 (aged 21)	Right-handed	Right-arm medium
25	Willem Myburgh	1 December 2000 (aged 25)	Right-handed	Right-arm fast
31	Jack Brassell	31 March 2005 (aged 20)	Right-handed	Right-arm medium
43	Louren Steenkamp	8 May 1997 (aged 28)	Right-handed	Right-arm off break
48	Zane Green (wk)	11 October 1996 (aged 29)	Left-handed	—N/a
49	Jan Frylinck	6 April 1994 (aged 31)	Left-handed	Left-arm medium fast
52	Max Heingo	1 January 2005 (aged 21)	Right-handed	Right-arm medium
66	Jan Balt	9 November 2003 (aged 22)	Left-handed	Left-arm off break
70	Ruben Trumpelmann	1 February 1998 (aged 28)	Right-handed	Left-arm fast medium
76	Alexander Volschenk (Note: Ben Shikongo was ruled out of the tournament due to an injury and was replaced by Alexander Volschenk.)	20 June 2005 (aged 20)	Right-handed	Left-arm medium
47	~~Ben Shikongo~~	8 May 2000 (aged 25)	Right-handed	Right-arm fast medium

=== Netherlands ===
- Squad announcement date: 12 January 2026
- Coach: (South Africa) Ryan Cook

Netherlands squad for the tournament
No.	Player	Date of birth	Batting style	Bowling style
1	Kyle Klein	3 July 2001 (aged 24)	Right-handed	Right-arm medium fast
4	Max O'Dowd	4 March 1994 (aged 31)	Right-handed	Right-arm leg break
5	Bas de Leede	15 November 1999 (aged 26)	Right-handed	Right-arm medium fast
10	Timm van der Gugten	25 February 1991 (aged 34)	Right-handed	Right-arm medium fast
12	Fred Klaassen	13 November 1992 (aged 33)	Right-handed	Left-arm medium fast
15	Zach Lion-Cachet	15 December 2003 (aged 22)	Right-handed	Right-arm off break
17	Logan van Beek	7 September 1990 (aged 35)	Right-handed	Right-arm medium fast
35	Scott Edwards (c, wk)	23 August 1996 (aged 29)	Right-handed	—N/a
36	Noah Croes	13 December 1999 (aged 26)	Right-handed	Right-arm medium
47	Paul van Meekeren	15 January 1993 (aged 33)	Right-handed	Right-arm fast medium
48	Colin Ackermann	4 April 1991 (aged 34)	Right-handed	Right-arm off spin
52	Roelof van der Merwe	31 December 1984 (aged 41)	Right-handed	Slow left-arm orthodox
55	Michael Levitt	19 June 2003 (aged 22)	Right-handed	Slow left-arm orthodox
66	Saqib Zulfiqar	28 March 1997 (aged 28)	Right-handed	Right-arm leg break
88	Aryan Dutt	17 May 2003 (aged 22)	Right-handed	Right-arm off break

=== Pakistan ===
- Squad announcement date: 25 January 2026.
- Coach: (New Zealand) Mike Hesson

Pakistan squad for the tournament
No.	Player	Date of birth	Batting style	Bowling style	PSL team (Note: As of 2025 Pakistan Super League)
7	Shadab Khan	4 October 1998 (aged 27)	Right-handed	Right-arm leg spin	Islamabad United
10	Shaheen Afridi	6 April 2000 (aged 25)	Left-handed	Left-arm fast	Lahore Qalandars
21	Mohammad Nawaz	21 March 1994 (aged 31)	Left-handed	Slow left-arm orthodox	Quetta Gladiators
36	Khawaja Nafay (wk)	13 February 2002 (aged 23)	Right-handed	Right-arm off-break	Quetta Gladiators
39	Fakhar Zaman	10 April 1990 (aged 35)	Left-handed	Slow left-arm orthodox	Lahore Qalandars
40	Abrar Ahmed	11 September 1998 (aged 27)	Right-handed	Right-arm leg spin	Quetta Gladiators
41	Faheem Ashraf	16 January 1994 (aged 32)	Left-handed	Right-arm medium	Quetta Gladiators
51	Sahibzada Farhan (wk)	6 March 1996 (aged 29)	Right-handed	—N/a	Islamabad United
56	Babar Azam	15 October 1994 (aged 31)	Right-handed	Right-arm off break	Peshawar Zalmi
63	Saim Ayub	24 May 2002 (aged 23)	Left-handed	Right-arm off break	Karachi Kings
67	Salman Ali Agha (c)	23 November 1993 (aged 32)	Right-handed	Right-arm off break	Islamabad United
71	Naseem Shah	15 February 2003 (aged 22)	Right-handed	Right-arm fast	Islamabad United
76	Usman Tariq	7 June 1995 (aged 30)	Right-handed	Right-arm off break	Quetta Gladiators
78	Usman Khan (wk)	10 May 1995 (aged 30)	Right-handed	Right-arm off-break	Multan Sultans
92	Salman Mirza	1 January 1994 (aged 32)	Right-handed	Left-arm medium	Lahore Qalandars

=== United States ===
- Squad announcement date: 30 January 2026
- Coach: (Sri Lanka) Pubudu Dassanayake

United States squad for the tournament
No.	Player	Date of birth	Batting style	Bowling style	MLC team (Note: As of 2025 Major League Cricket)
1	Monank Patel (c, wk)	1 May 1993 (aged 32)	Right-handed	—N/a	MI New York
7	Harmeet Singh	7 September 1992 (aged 33)	Left-handed	Slow left-arm orthodox	Seattle Orcas
9	Mohammad Mohsin	15 April 1996 (aged 29)	Left-handed	Right-arm leg spin	Texas Super Kings
12	Saiteja Mukkamalla	9 April 2004 (aged 21)	Right-handed	Right-arm off break	Texas Super Kings
14	Milind Kumar	15 February 1991 (aged 34)	Right-handed	Right-arm off break	Texas Super Kings
16	Shadley van Schalkwyk	5 July 1988 (aged 37)	Left-handed	Right-arm medium	Los Angeles Knight Riders
20	Saurabh Netravalkar	16 October 1991 (aged 34)	Right-handed	Left-arm fast medium	Washington Freedom
23	Ali Khan	13 December 1990 (aged 35)	Right-handed	Right-arm fast medium	Los Angeles Knight Riders
26	Shubham Ranjane	26 March 1994 (aged 31)	Right-handed	Right-arm medium	Texas Super Kings
27	Sanjay Krishnamurthi	2 June 2003 (aged 22)	Right-handed	Slow left-arm orthodox	San Francisco Unicorns
30	Shayan Jahangir (wk)	24 December 1994 (aged 31)	Right-handed	Right-arm fast medium	Seattle Orcas
31	Shehan Jayasuriya	12 September 1991 (aged 34)	Left-handed	Right-arm off break	Seattle Orcas
64	Nosthush Kenjige	2 March 1991 (aged 34)	Right-handed	Slow left-arm orthodox	MI New York
68	Andries Gous (wk)	24 November 1994 (aged 31)	Right-handed	—N/a	Washington Freedom
91	Ehsan Adil (Note: Jessy Singh was ruled out of the tournament due to an injury and was replaced by Ehsan Adil.)	15 March 1993 (aged 32)	Right-handed	Right-arm medium	MI New York
2	~~Jessy Singh (vc)~~	10 February 1993 (aged 32)	Right-handed	Right-arm medium	Seattle Orcas

== Group B ==
=== Australia ===
- Squad announcement date: 1 January 2026
- Coach: (Australia) Andrew McDonald

Australia squad for the tournament
No.	Player	Date of birth	Batting style	Bowling style	BBL team (Note: As of 2025–26 Big Bash League)
7	Matt Renshaw (Note: Matthew Short was dropped from the final squad and was replaced by Matt Renshaw.)	28 March 1996 (aged 29)	Left-handed	Right-arm off break	Brisbane Heat
8	Mitchell Marsh (c)	20 October 1991 (aged 34)	Right-handed	Right-arm medium-fast	Perth Scorchers
9	Cooper Connolly	22 August 2003 (aged 22)	Left-handed	Left-arm slow orthodox	Perth Scorchers
12	Nathan Ellis	22 September 1994 (aged 31)	Right-handed	Right-arm fast medium	Hobart Hurricanes
15	Xavier Bartlett	17 December 1998 (aged 27)	Right-handed	Right-arm fast medium	Brisbane Heat
17	Marcus Stoinis	16 August 1989 (aged 36)	Right-handed	Right-arm medium-fast	Melbourne Stars
32	Glenn Maxwell	14 October 1988 (aged 37)	Right-handed	Right-arm off break	Melbourne Stars
42	Cameron Green	3 June 1999 (aged 26)	Right-handed	Right-arm fast medium	—N/a
48	Josh Inglis (wk)	4 March 1995 (aged 30)	Right-handed	—N/a	Perth Scorchers
49	Steve Smith (Note: Josh Hazlewood was ruled out of the tournament due to an injury and was replaced by Steve Smith.)	12 June 1989 (aged 36)	Right-handed	Right-arm leg break	Sydney Sixers
50	Matthew Kuhnemann	20 September 1996 (aged 29)	Left-handed	Left-arm slow orthodox	Brisbane Heat
62	Travis Head (vc)	29 December 1993 (aged 32)	Left-handed	Right-arm off break	Adelaide Strikers
82	Ben Dwarshuis (Note: Pat Cummins was ruled out of the tournament due to an injury and was replaced by Ben Dwarshuis.)	23 June 1994 (aged 31)	Left-handed	Left-arm fast medium	Sydney Sixers
85	Tim David	23 June 1994 (aged 31)	Right-handed	Right-arm off break	Hobart Hurricanes
88	Adam Zampa	31 March 1992 (aged 33)	Right-handed	Right-arm leg break	Melbourne Renegades
5	~~Matthew Short~~	8 November 1995 (aged 30)	Right-handed	Right-arm off break	Adelaide Strikers
30	~~Pat Cummins~~	8 May 1993 (aged 32)	Right-handed	Right-arm fast	Sydney Thunder
38	~~Josh Hazlewood~~	3 May 1991 (aged 34)	Left-handed	Right-arm fast medium	Sydney Sixers
77	Sean Abbott†	29 February 1992 (aged 33)	Right-handed	Right-arm fast medium	Sydney Sixers

=== Ireland ===
- Squad announcement date: 9 January 2026
- Coach: (South Africa) Heinrich Malan

Ireland squad for the tournament
No.	Player	Date of birth	Batting style	Bowling style	IPT20 team (Note: As of 2025 Inter-Provincial Trophy)
3	Lorcan Tucker (vc, wk)	10 September 1996 (aged 29)	Right-handed	—N/a	Leinster Lightning
4	Tim Tector	7 March 2003 (aged 22)	Right-handed	Right-arm off break	Leinster Lightning
11	Matthew Humphreys	28 September 2002 (aged 23)	Right-handed	Left-arm orthodox spin	Northern Knights
12	Sam Topping (Note: Paul Stirling was ruled out of the tournament due to an injury and was replaced by Sam Topping.)	6 May 2005 (aged 20)	Left-handed	—N/a	North West Warriors
13	Harry Tector	6 December 1999 (aged 26)	Right-handed	Right-arm off break	Leinster Lightning
15	Ross Adair	21 April 1994 (aged 31)	Right-handed	Slow left-arm orthodox	Northern Knights
32	Mark Adair	27 March 1996 (aged 29)	Right-handed	Right-arm medium fast	Northern Knights
44	Craig Young	4 April 1990 (aged 35)	Right-handed	Right-arm medium fast	North West Warriors
50	George Dockrell	22 July 1992 (aged 33)	Right-handed	Slow left-arm orthodox	Leinster Lightning
60	Barry McCarthy	13 September 1992 (aged 33)	Right-handed	Right-arm medium fast	Leinster Lightning
64	Gareth Delany	28 April 1997 (aged 28)	Right-handed	Right-arm leg break	Munster Reds
72	Ben Calitz	6 July 2002 (aged 23)	Left-handed	Right-arm slow	Northern Knights
82	Josh Little	1 November 1999 (aged 26)	Right-handed	Left-arm medium fast	Leinster Lightning
85	Curtis Campher	20 April 1999 (aged 26)	Right-handed	Right-arm medium fast	Munster Reds
86	Ben White	29 August 1998 (aged 27)	Right-handed	Right-arm leg break	Northern Knights
1	~~Paul Stirling (c)~~	3 September 1990 (aged 35)	Right-handed	Right-arm off break	Northern Knights

=== Oman ===
- Squad announcement date: 30 December 2025
- Coach: (Sri Lanka) Duleep Mendis

Oman squad for the tournament
No.	Player	Date of birth	Batting style	Bowling style
2	Hammad Mirza (wk)	12 May 1998 (aged 27)	Right-handed	—N/a
5	Jay Odedra	5 November 1989 (aged 36)	Right-handed	Right-arm off break
7	Aamir Kaleem (Note: Hassnain Shah was ruled out of the tournament due to an injury and was replaced by Aamir Kaleem.)	21 November 1981 (aged 44)	Left-handed	Slow left-arm orthodox
8	Nadeem Khan	1 June 2001 (aged 24)	Left-handed	Left-arm wrist spin
9	Shakeel Ahmed	4 February 1988 (aged 38)	Left-handed	Slow left-arm orthodox
10	Jatinder Singh (c)	5 March 1989 (aged 36)	Right-handed	Right-arm off break
12	Shah Faisal	5 January 1997 (aged 29)	Left-handed	Left-arm medium fast
13	Karan Sonavale	6 December 1994 (aged 31)	Right-handed	Right-arm off break
17	Wasim Ali	7 December 1998 (aged 27)	Left-handed	Slow left-arm orthodox
21	Sufyan Mehmood	21 October 1991 (aged 34)	Left-handed	Right-arm medium
24	Ashish Odedara	24 October 1991 (aged 34)	Right-handed	Left-arm wrist spin
33	Shafiq Jan	2 February 1994 (aged 32)	Right-handed	Right-arm medium
36	Vinayak Shukla (vc, wk)	18 June 1994 (aged 31)	Right-handed	—N/a
48	Jiten Ramanandi	15 September 1994 (aged 31)	Left-handed	Left-arm medium
99	Mohammad Nadeem	4 September 1982 (aged 43)	Right-handed	Right-arm medium fast
6	~~Hassnain Shah~~	10 December 1996 (aged 29)	Right-handed	Right-arm medium

=== Sri Lanka ===
- Squad announcement date: 2 February 2026
- Coach: (Sri Lanka) Sanath Jayasuriya

Sri Lanka squad for the tournament
No.	Player	Date of birth	Batting style	Bowling style	LPL team (Note: As of 2024 Lanka Premier League)
5	Dushmantha Chameera	11 January 1992 (aged 34)	Right-handed	Right-arm fast	Kandy Falcons
7	Dasun Shanaka (c)	9 September 1991 (aged 34)	Right-handed	Right-arm medium	Kandy Falcons
9	Dunith Wellalage	9 January 2003 (aged 23)	Left-handed	Left-arm orthodox	Colombo Strikers
13	Kusal Mendis (wk)	2 February 1995 (aged 31)	Right-handed	Right-arm leg break	Jaffna Kings
18	Pathum Nissanka	18 May 1998 (aged 27)	Right-handed	—N/a	Jaffna Kings
21	Kamindu Mendis	30 September 1998 (aged 27)	Left-handed	Ambidextrous spin	Kandy Falcons
34	Dushan Hemantha (Note: Wanindu Hasaranga was ruled out of the tournament due to an injury and was replaced by Dushan Hemantha.)	24 May 1994 (aged 31)	Right-handed	Right-arm leg break	Dambulla Sixers
40	Pramod Madushan (Note: Eshan Malinga was ruled out of the tournament due to an injury and was replaced by Pramod Madushan.)	4 December 1993 (aged 32)	Right-handed	Right arm medium-fast	Jaffna Kings
42	Kamil Mishara	24 April 2001 (aged 24)	Left-handed	Right-arm off break	Kandy Falcons
51	Pavan Rathnayake	24 August 2002 (aged 23)	Right-handed	Right-arm off break	Kandy Falcons
55	Kusal Perera (wk)	17 August 1990 (aged 35)	Left-handed	—N/a	Dambulla Sixers
61	Maheesh Theekshana	1 August 2000 (aged 25)	Right-handed	Right-arm off break	Galle Marvels
72	Charith Asalanka	29 June 1997 (aged 28)	Left-handed	Right-arm off break	Jaffna Kings
95	Janith Liyanage	12 July 1995 (aged 30)	Right-handed	Right-arm medium fast	Galle Marvels
98	Dilshan Madushanka (Note: Matheesha Pathirana was ruled out of the tournament due to an injury and was replaced by Dilshan Madushanka.)	18 September 2000 (aged 25)	Right-handed	Left-arm fast-medium	Dambulla Sixers
49	~~Wanindu Hasaranga~~	29 July 1997 (aged 28)	Right-handed	Right-arm leg break	Kandy Falcons
81	~~Matheesha Pathirana~~	18 December 2002 (aged 23)	Right-handed	Right-arm fast	Colombo Strikers
97	~~Eshan Malinga~~	4 February 2001 (aged 25)	Left-handed	Right-arm medium fast	Jaffna Kings

=== Zimbabwe ===
- Squad announcement date: 2 January 2026
- Coach: (South Africa) Justin Sammons

Zimbabwe squad for the tournament
No.	Player	Date of birth	Batting style	Bowling style	ZT20 team (Note: As of 2025–26 Zimbabwe Domestic Twenty20)
8	Dion Myers	21 March 2002 (aged 23)	Right-handed	Right-arm medium	Mashonaland Eagles
11	Wellington Masakadza	10 April 1993 (aged 32)	Left-handed	Slow left-arm orthodox	Mountaineers
21	Tashinga Musekiwa	10 February 2000 (aged 25)	Right-handed	Right-arm medium	Mid West Rhinos
24	Sikandar Raza (c)	24 April 1986 (aged 39)	Right-handed	Right-arm off break	Matabeleland Tuskers
30	Graeme Cremer	19 September 1986 (aged 39)	Right-handed	Right-arm leg break	Mid West Rhinos
32	Tony Munyonga	31 January 1999 (aged 27)	Right-handed	Right-arm off break	Mashonaland Eagles
39	Richard Ngarava	29 December 1997 (aged 28)	Left-handed	Left-arm fast medium	Mountaineers
40	Blessing Muzarabani	2 October 1996 (aged 29)	Right-handed	Right-arm fast medium	Mashonaland Eagles
42	Clive Madande (wk)	12 April 2000 (aged 25)	Left-handed	—N/a	Matabeleland Tuskers
49	Tadiwanashe Marumani (wk)	2 January 2002 (aged 24)	Left-handed	Right-arm off break	Mashonaland Eagles
54	Ryan Burl	15 April 1994 (aged 31)	Left-handed	Right-arm leg break	Mid West Rhinos
57	Ben Curran (Note: Brendan Taylor was ruled out of the tournament due to an injury and was replaced by Ben Curran.)	7 June 1996 (aged 29)	Left-handed	Right-arm off break	Mid West Rhinos
66	Tinotenda Maposa	29 August 2003 (aged 22)	Right-handed	Right-arm medium	Matabeleland Tuskers
80	Brad Evans	24 March 1997 (aged 28)	Right-handed	Right-arm fast	Mid West Rhinos
86	Brian Bennett	10 November 2003 (aged 22)	Right-handed	Right-arm off break	Mountaineers
1	~~Brendan Taylor (wk)~~	6 February 1986 (aged 40)	Right-handed	Right-arm off break	Mid West Rhinos

== Group C ==
=== England ===
- Squad announcement date: 30 December 2025
- Coach: (New Zealand) Brendon McCullum

England squad for the tournament
No.	Player	Date of birth	Batting style	Bowling style	T20 Blast team (Note: As of 2025 T20 Blast)
17	Ben Duckett	17 October 1994 (aged 31)	Left-handed	—N/a	Notts Outlaws
22	Jofra Archer	1 April 1995 (aged 30)	Right-handed	Right-arm fast	Sussex Sharks
53	Rehan Ahmed	13 August 2004 (aged 21)	Right-handed	Right-arm leg break	Leicestershire Foxes
56	Josh Tongue	15 November 1997 (aged 28)	Right-handed	Right-arm fast medium	Notts Outlaws
57	Luke Wood	2 August 1995 (aged 30)	Left-handed	Left-arm fast medium	Lancashire Lightning
58	Sam Curran	3 June 1998 (aged 27)	Left-handed	Left-arm medium fast	Surrey
61	Phil Salt (wk)	28 August 1996 (aged 29)	Right-handed	—N/a	Lancashire Lightning
63	Jos Buttler (wk)	8 September 1990 (aged 35)	Right-handed	—N/a	Lancashire Lightning
75	Jamie Overton	10 April 1994 (aged 31)	Right-handed	Right-arm fast	Surrey
82	Jacob Bethell	23 October 2003 (aged 22)	Left-handed	Slow left-arm orthodox	Warwickshire Bears
83	Liam Dawson	1 March 1990 (aged 35)	Right-handed	Slow left-arm orthodox	Hampshire Hawks
85	Will Jacks	21 November 1998 (aged 27)	Right-handed	Right-arm off spin	Surrey
88	Harry Brook (c)	22 February 1999 (aged 26)	Right-handed	Right-arm medium	Yorkshire
95	Adil Rashid	17 February 1988 (aged 37)	Right-handed	Right-arm leg break	Yorkshire
98	Tom Banton	11 November 1998 (aged 27)	Right-handed	—N/a	Somerset

=== Italy ===
- Squad announcement date: 17 January 2026
- Coach: (Canada) John Davison

Italy squad for the tournament
No.	Player	Date of birth	Batting style	Bowling style
6	Grant Stewart	19 February 1994 (aged 31)	Right-handed	Right-arm medium fast
7	Gian-Piero Meade (wk)	19 March 1996 (aged 29)	Right-handed	Right-arm medium fast
10	Jaspreet Singh	9 June 1993 (aged 32)	Right-handed	Right-arm fast medium
11	Anthony Mosca	21 August 1991 (aged 34)	Right-handed	—N/a
14	Syed Naqvi	2 February 2002 (aged 24)	Right-handed	Right-arm medium fast
17	Zain Ali	7 December 2001 (aged 24)	Right-handed	Right-arm medium
21	JJ Smuts	21 September 1988 (aged 37)	Right-handed	Slow Left arm Orthodox
24	Marcus Campopiano	21 February 1995 (aged 30)	Right-handed	Right-arm off break
25	Harry Manenti (vc)	5 October 2000 (aged 25)	Right-handed	Right-arm medium fast
30	Ali Hasan	29 October 2002 (aged 23)	Left-handed	Left-arm fast medium
46	Ben Manenti	23 March 1997 (aged 28)	Right-handed	Right-arm off break
54	Thomas Draca	23 October 2000 (aged 25)	Right-handed	Right-arm medium
62	Justin Mosca	15 November 1994 (aged 31)	Left-handed	—N/a
77	Wayne Madsen (c)	2 January 1984 (aged 42)	Right-handed	Right-arm off break
99	Crishan Kalugamage	16 June 1991 (aged 34)	Right-handed	Right-arm Leg break

=== Nepal ===
- Squad announcement date: 6 January 2026
- Coach: (Australia) Stuart Law

Nepal squad for the tournament
No.	Player	Date of birth	Batting style	Bowling style	NPL team (Note: As of 2025 Nepal Premier League)
1	Lokesh Bam	19 December 2000 (aged 25)	Right-handed	Right-arm medium	Biratnagar Kings
9	Aasif Sheikh (wk)	22 January 2001 (aged 25)	Right-handed	—N/a	Janakpur Bolts
10	Sompal Kami	2 February 1996 (aged 30)	Right-handed	Right-arm medium-fast	Karnali Yaks
14	Kushal Bhurtel	22 January 1997 (aged 29)	Right-handed	Right-arm leg break	Pokhara Avengers
15	Gulshan Jha	17 February 2006 (aged 19)	Left-handed	Right-arm medium	Karnali Yaks
17	Rohit Paudel (c)	2 September 2002 (aged 23)	Right-handed	Right-arm Off spin	Lumbini Lions
21	Sundeep Jora	22 October 2001 (aged 24)	Right-handed	—N/a	Lumbini Lions
22	Nandan Yadav	27 July 2000 (aged 25)	Right-handed	Right-arm medium-fast	Karnali Yaks
24	Aarif Sheikh	4 October 1998 (aged 27)	Right-handed	Right-arm medium	Sudurpaschim Royals
25	Sandeep Lamichhane	2 August 2000 (aged 25)	Right-handed	Right-arm leg break	Biratnagar Kings
27	Lalit Rajbanshi	27 February 1999 (aged 26)	Right-handed	Slow left-arm orthodox	Janakpur Bolts
33	Karan KC	10 October 1991 (aged 34)	Right-handed	Right-arm medium	Kathmandu Gorkhas
39	Sher Malla	1 December 2002 (aged 23)	Left-handed	Right-arm off break	Lumbini Lions
45	Dipendra Singh Airee (vc)	24 January 2000 (aged 26)	Right-handed	Right-arm Off spin	Sudurpaschim Royals
75	Basir Ahamad	11 September 2003 (aged 22)	Left-handed	Slow left-arm orthodox	Biratnagar Kings

=== Scotland ===
- Squad announcement date: 26 January 2026
- Coach: (England) Owen Dawkins

Scotland squad for the tournament
No.	Player	Date of birth	Batting style	Bowling style
2	Zainullah Ihsan	28 March 2006 (aged 19)	Right-handed	Right-arm medium
4	Brad Currie	8 November 1998 (aged 27)	Right-handed	Left-arm medium fast
6	Oliver Davidson	28 July 2004 (aged 21)	Left-handed	Slow left-arm orthodox
9	Matthew Cross (wk)	15 October 1992 (aged 33)	Right-handed	—N/a
13	Chris Greaves	12 October 1990 (aged 35)	Right-handed	Right-arm leg break
21	Brandon McMullen	18 October 1999 (aged 26)	Right-handed	Right-arm fast medium
23	Finlay McCreath	16 October 1998 (aged 27)	Right-handed	Right-arm medium fast
29	Michael Leask	29 October 1990 (aged 35)	Right-handed	Right-arm off break
42	Tom Bruce	2 August 1991 (aged 34)	Right-handed	Right-arm off break
44	Richie Berrington (c)	3 April 1987 (aged 38)	Right-handed	Right-arm medium fast
49	Michael Jones	5 January 1998 (aged 28)	Right-handed	Right-arm off break
51	Mark Watt	29 July 1996 (aged 29)	Left-handed	Slow left-arm orthodox
58	Brad Wheal	28 August 1996 (aged 29)	Right-handed	Right-arm fast medium
66	Jack Jarvis (Note: Safyaan Sharif was ruled out of the tournament due to an injury and was replaced by Jack Jarvis.)	29 May 2003 (aged 22)	Right-handed	Right-arm medium fast
93	George Munsey	21 February 1993 (aged 32)	Left-handed	Right-arm medium fast
50	~~Safyaan Sharif~~	24 May 1991 (aged 34)	Right-handed	Right-arm fast medium
3	Jasper Davidson†	15 March 2002 (aged 23)	Right-handed	Right-arm fast

=== West Indies ===
- Squad announcement date: 26 January 2026
- Coach: (Cricket West Indies) Daren Sammy

West Indies squad for the tournament
No.	Player	Date of birth	Batting style	Bowling style	CPL team (Note: As of 2025 Caribbean Premier League)
2	Shimron Hetmyer	26 December 1996 (aged 29)	Left-handed	—N/a	Guyana Amazon Warriors
4	Shai Hope (c, wk)	10 November 1993 (aged 32)	Right-handed	Right-arm medium	Guyana Amazon Warriors
5	Matthew Forde	29 April 2002 (aged 23)	Right-handed	Right-arm medium	Saint Lucia Kings
7	Akeal Hosein	25 April 1993 (aged 32)	Left-handed	Slow left-arm orthodox	Trinbago Knight Riders
10	Roston Chase	22 March 1992 (aged 33)	Right-handed	Right-arm off break	Saint Lucia Kings
16	Romario Shepherd	26 November 1994 (aged 31)	Right-handed	Right-arm fast medium	Guyana Amazon Warriors
25	Johnson Charles	14 January 1989 (aged 37)	Right-handed	Left-arm orthodox	Saint Lucia Kings
33	Jayden Seales	10 September 2001 (aged 24)	Left-handed	Right-arm medium fast	Antigua & Barbuda Falcons
43	Quentin Sampson	4 August 2000 (aged 25)	Right-handed	Right-arm medium fast	Guyana Amazon Warriors
52	Rovman Powell	23 July 1993 (aged 32)	Right-handed	Right-arm medium fast	Barbados Royals
53	Brandon King	16 December 1994 (aged 31)	Right-handed	—N/a	Barbados Royals
64	Gudakesh Motie	29 March 1995 (aged 30)	Left-handed	Slow left-arm orthodox	Guyana Amazon Warriors
68	Sherfane Rutherford	15 August 1998 (aged 27)	Left-handed	Right-arm medium fast	Barbados Royals
70	Shamar Joseph	31 August 1999 (aged 26)	Left-handed	Right-arm fast	Guyana Amazon Warriors
98	Jason Holder	5 November 1991 (aged 34)	Right-handed	Right-arm medium fast	St Kitts & Nevis Patriots

== Group D ==
=== Afghanistan ===
- Squad announcement date: 31 December 2025
- Coach: (England) Jonathan Trott

Afghanistan squad for the tournament
No.	Player	Date of birth	Batting style	Bowling style	SCL team (Note: As of 2025 Shpageeza Cricket League)
5	Fazalhaq Farooqi	22 September 2000 (aged 25)	Right-handed	Left-arm fast medium	Amo Sharks
7	Mohammad Nabi	1 January 1985 (aged 41)	Right-handed	Right-arm off spin	Mis Ainak Knights
9	Azmatullah Omarzai	24 March 2000 (aged 24)	Right-handed	Right-arm medium fast	Amo Sharks
14	Gulbadin Naib	16 March 1991 (aged 34)	Right-handed	Right-arm fast medium	Band-e-Amir Dragons
15	Noor Ahmad	3 January 2005 (aged 21)	Left-handed	Left-arm unorthodox spin	Boost Defenders
18	Ibrahim Zadran (vc)	12 December 2001 (aged 24)	Right-handed	Right-arm medium fast	Boost Defenders
19	Rashid Khan (c)	20 September 1998 (aged 27)	Right-handed	Right-arm leg break	Speenghar Tigers
21	Rahmanullah Gurbaz (wk)	28 November 2001 (aged 24)	Right-handed	—N/a	Mis Ainak Knights
25	Shahidullah	6 February 1999 (aged 27)	Left-handed	Slow left-arm orthodox	Amo Sharks
26	Sediqullah Atal	12 August 2001 (aged 24)	Left-handed	—N/a	Band-e-Amir Dragons
27	Mohammad Ishaq (wk)	1 February 2005 (aged 21)	Right-handed	—N/a	Amo Sharks
57	Abdullah Ahmadzai	26 June 2003 (aged 22)	Right-handed	Right-arm medium-fast	Speenghar Tigers
65	Ziaur Rahman (Note: Naveen-ul-Haq was ruled out of the tournament due to an injury and was replaced by Ziaur Rahman.)	17 October 1998 (aged 27)	Right-handed	Right-arm medium-fast	Mis Ainak Knights
77	Mujeeb Ur Rahman	28 March 2001 (aged 24)	Right-handed	Right-arm off spin	Mis Ainak Knights
81	Darwish Rasooli	12 December 1999 (aged 26)	Right-handed	Right-arm off-break	Band-e-Amir Dragons
78	~~Naveen-ul-Haq~~	23 September 1999 (aged 26)	Right-handed	Right-arm medium fast	—N/a
55	Ijaz Ahmad Ahmadzai†	25 June 2003 (aged 22)	Right-handed	Right-arm medium	Speenghar Tigers
56	Fareed Ahmad†	10 August 1994 (aged 31)	Left-handed	Left-arm fast medium	Speenghar Tigers
70	Allah Ghazanfar†	20 March 2006 (aged 19)	Right-handed	Right-arm off-break	Mis Ainak Knights

=== Canada ===
- Squad announcement date: 14 January 2026
- Coach: (Canada) Ingleton Liburd

Canada squad for the tournament
No.	Player	Date of birth	Batting style	Bowling style	GT20 Canada team (Note: As of 2024 Global T20 Canada)
4	Shreyas Movva (wk)	4 September 1993 (aged 32)	Right-handed	—N/a	Surrey Jaguars
5	Kaleem Sana	1 January 1994 (aged 32)	Right-handed	Left-arm medium fast	Montreal Tigers
9	Ansh Patel	19 February 2002 (aged 23)	Right-handed	Left arm chinaman	—N/a
14	Ajayveer Hundal	9 September 2005 (aged 20)	Right-handed	Right-arm medium	Vancouver Knights
15	Jaskaran Singh	4 September 1989 (aged 36)	Right-handed	Right-arm medium fast	Montreal Tigers
18	Harsh Thaker	24 October 1997 (aged 28)	Right-handed	Right-arm off break	Vancouver Knights
20	Dillon Heyliger	21 October 1989 (aged 36)	Right-handed	Right-arm medium fast	Bangla Tigers Mississauga
23	Saad Bin Zafar	10 November 1986 (aged 39)	Left-handed	Slow left-arm orthodox	Toronto Nationals
37	Navneet Dhaliwal	10 October 1988 (aged 37)	Right-handed	Right-arm medium	Surrey Jaguars
49	Ravinderpal Singh	14 October 1988 (aged 37)	Right-handed	Right-arm medium	Brampton Wolves
50	Shivam Sharma	27 March 1998 (aged 27)	Right-handed	Right-arm off break	—N/a
58	Kanwarpal Tathgur (wk)	5 August 1993 (aged 32)	Right-handed	—N/a	Brampton Wolves
63	Nicholas Kirton	6 May 1998 (aged 27)	Left-handed	Right-arm off break	Toronto Nationals
84	Dilpreet Bajwa (c)	26 January 2003 (aged 23)	Right-handed	Right-arm off break	Montreal Tigers
92	Yuvraj Samra	29 September 2006 (aged 19)	Left-handed	Right-arm medium	Vancouver Knights

=== New Zealand ===
- Squad announcement date: 7 January 2026
- Coach: (South Africa) Rob Walter

New Zealand squad for the tournament
No.	Player	Date of birth	Batting style	Bowling style	Super Smash team (Note: As of 2025–26 Men's Super Smash)
8	Rachin Ravindra	18 November 1999 (aged 26)	Left-handed	Slow left-arm orthodox	Wellington Firebirds
12	Kyle Jamieson (Note: Adam Milne was ruled out of the tournament due to an injury and was replaced by Kyle Jamieson.)	30 December 1994 (aged 31)	Right-handed	Right-arm fast-medium	Canterbury Kings
16	Finn Allen (wk)	22 April 1999 (aged 26)	Right-handed	Right-arm off spin	Auckland Aces
21	Matt Henry	14 December 1991 (aged 34)	Right-handed	Right-arm fast medium	Canterbury Kings
23	Glenn Phillips	6 December 1996 (aged 29)	Right-handed	Right-arm off spin	Otago Volts
27	Jacob Duffy	2 August 1994 (aged 31)	Right-handed	Right-arm fast-medium	Otago Volts
43	Tim Seifert (wk)	14 December 1994 (aged 31)	Right-handed	—N/a	Northern Brave
44	Cole McConchie (Note: Michael Bracewell was ruled out of the tournament due to an injury and was replaced by Cole McConchie.)	12 January 1992 (aged 34)	Right-handed	Right-arm off spin	Canterbury Kings
50	James Neesham	17 September 1990 (aged 35)	Left-handed	Right-arm medium fast	Auckland Aces
61	Ish Sodhi	31 October 1992 (aged 33)	Right-handed	Right-arm leg break	Northern Brave
69	Lockie Ferguson	13 June 1991 (aged 34)	Right-handed	Right-arm fast	Auckland Aces
74	Mitchell Santner (c)	5 February 1992 (aged 34)	Left-handed	Slow left-arm orthodox	Northern Brave
75	Daryl Mitchell	20 May 1991 (aged 34)	Right-handed	Right-arm medium	Canterbury Kings
80	Mark Chapman	27 June 1994 (aged 31)	Left-handed	Slow left-arm orthodox	Auckland Aces
88	Devon Conway (wk)	8 July 1991 (aged 34)	Left-handed	Right-arm medium	Wellington Firebirds
4	~~Michael Bracewell~~	14 February 1991 (aged 34)	Left-handed	Right-arm off spin	Wellington Firebirds
20	~~Adam Milne~~	13 April 1992 (aged 33)	Right-handed	Right-arm fast	Central Stags
14	Ben Sears†	11 February 1998 (aged 26)	Right-handed	Right-arm fast medium	Wellington Firebirds

=== South Africa ===
- Squad announcement date: 2 January 2026
- Coach: (South Africa) Shukri Conrad

South Africa squad for the tournament
No.	Player	Date of birth	Batting style	Bowling style	SA20 team (Note: As of 2026 SA20)
4	Aiden Markram (c)	4 October 1994 (aged 31)	Right-handed	Right-arm off break	Durban's Super Giants
10	David Miller	10 June 1989 (aged 36)	Left-handed	Right-arm off spin	Paarl Royals
12	Quinton de Kock (wk)	17 December 1992 (aged 33)	Left-handed	Slow left-arm orthodox	Sunrisers Eastern Cape
16	Keshav Maharaj	7 February 1990 (aged 36)	Right-handed	Slow left-arm orthodox	Pretoria Capitals
20	Anrich Nortje	16 November 1994 (aged 31)	Right-handed	Right-arm fast	Sunrisers Eastern Cape
22	Lungi Ngidi	29 March 1996 (aged 29)	Right-handed	Right-arm fast	Pretoria Capitals
25	Kagiso Rabada	25 May 1995 (aged 30)	Right-handed	Right-arm fast	MI Cape Town
27	George Linde	4 December 1991 (aged 34)	Left-handed	Slow left-arm orthodox	MI Cape Town
30	Tristan Stubbs (wk) (Note: Donovan Ferreira was ruled out of the tournament due to an injury and was replaced by Tristan Stubbs.)	14 August 2000 (aged 25)	Right-handed	Right-arm off break	Sunrisers Eastern Cape
37	Corbin Bosch	10 September 1994 (aged 31)	Right-handed	Right-arm fast medium	MI Cape Town
44	Ryan Rickelton (Note: Tony de Zorzi was ruled out of the tournament due to an injury and was replaced by Ryan Rickelton.)	11 July 1996 (aged 29)	Left-handed	Slow left-arm orthodox	MI Cape Town
52	Dewald Brevis	29 April 2003 (aged 22)	Right-handed	Right-arm leg break	Pretoria Capitals
57	Jason Smith	11 October 1994 (aged 31)	Right-handed	Right-arm medium fast	MI Cape Town
70	Marco Jansen	1 May 2000 (aged 25)	Right-handed	Left-arm fast	Sunrisers Eastern Cape
81	Kwena Maphaka	8 April 2006 (aged 19)	Left-handed	Left-arm fast	Durban's Super Giants
33	~~Tony de Zorzi~~	28 August 1997 (aged 28)	Left-handed	Right-arm off break	Durban's Super Giants
55	~~Donovan Ferreira (wk)~~	21 July 1998 (aged 27)	Right-handed	Right-arm off break	Joburg Super Kings

=== United Arab Emirates ===
- Squad announcement date: 30 January 2026
- Coach: (India) Lalchand Rajput

United Arab Emirates squad for the tournament
No.	Player	Date of birth	Batting style	Bowling style	ILT20 team (Note: As of 2025–26 International League T20)
3	Aryansh Sharma (wk)	3 December 2004 (aged 21)	Right-handed	—N/a	—N/a
6	Muhammad Jawadullah	12 March 1999 (aged 26)	Left-handed	Left-arm fast medium	Dubai Capitals
7	Alishan Sharafu	10 January 2003 (aged 23)	Right-handed	Right-arm fast medium	Abu Dhabi Knight Riders
10	Muhammad Waseem (c)	12 February 1994 (aged 31)	Right-handed	Right-arm medium	MI Emirates
13	Simranjeet Singh	13 November 1989 (aged 36)	Left-handed	Slow left-arm orthodox	—N/a
19	Harshit Kaushik	19 September 1996 (aged 29)	Left-handed	Slow left-arm orthodox	—N/a
20	Dhruv Parashar	20 December 2004 (aged 21)	Right-handed	Right-arm off spin	—N/a
21	Mayank Kumar	5 February 1997 (aged 29)	Right-handed	—N/a	—N/a
45	Sohaib Khan	26 April 2001 (aged 24)	Right-handed	—N/a	—N/a
49	Syed Haider (wk) (Note: Muhammad Zohaib was dropped from the final squad and was replaced by Syed Haider.)	5 June 1998 (aged 27)	Right-handed	—N/a	Dubai Capitals
56	Muhammad Rohid	29 September 2002 (aged 23)	Right-handed	Left-arm medium fast	MI Emirates
59	Muhammad Arfan	1 May 1993 (aged 32)	Left-handed	Right-arm medium	—N/a
92	Junaid Siddique	6 December 1992 (aged 33)	Right-handed	Right-arm medium fast	Sharjah Warriorz
94	Haider Ali	5 July 1994 (aged 31)	Left-handed	Slow left-arm orthodox	Dubai Capitals
99	Muhammad Farooq	5 October 1992 (aged 33)	Right-handed	Right-arm leg break	Dubai Capitals
14	~~Muhammad Zohaib~~	5 October 1998 (aged 27)	Left-handed	Right-arm off break	—N/a
