= Irish cricket team in the United Arab Emirates in 2025–26 =

International cricket tour

The Ireland cricket team toured the United Arab Emirates in January 2026 to play Italy and the United Arab Emirates. The tour consisted of three Twenty20 International (T20I) matches against Italy, followed by two matches against the UAE. All three teams are using the games as preparation for the 2026 Men's T20 World Cup tournament. In November 2025, the Emirates Cricket Board (ECB) confirmed the fixtures for the tour. The Italy series was played at The Sevens Stadium. The series against UAE was played at the Dubai International Cricket Stadium.

== Squads ==
Ireland	Italy	United Arab Emirates
Paul Stirling (c); Lorcan Tucker (vc, wk); Mark Adair; Ross Adair; Ben Calitz (wk); Curtis Campher; Gareth Delany; George Dockrell; Matthew Humphreys; Josh Little; Barry McCarthy; Harry Tector; Tim Tector; Ben White; Craig Young	Wayne Madsen (c); Zain Ali; Marcus Campopiano; Thomas Draca; Ali Hasan; Crishan Kalugamage; Ben Manenti; Harry Manenti; Gian-Piero Meade (wk); Anthony Mosca; Justin Mosca; Syed Naqvi; Jaspreet Singh; JJ Smuts; Grant Stewart	Muhammad Waseem (c); Haider Ali; Muhammad Arfan; Basil Hameed; Rahul Chopra (wk); Muhammad Farooq; Muhammad Jawadullah; Harshit Kaushik; Sohaib Khan; Muhammad Rohid; Alishan Sharafu; Aryansh Sharma (wk); Junaid Siddique; Simranjeet Singh; Muhammad Zohaib

== Ireland v Italy T20I series ==
Irish cricket team against Italy in the UAE in 2025–26
	Ireland	Italy
- Dates: 23 – 26 January 2026
Captains	Paul Stirling	Wayne Madsen

Twenty20 International series
- Results: Ireland won the 3-match series 2–1
Most runs	Harry Tector (150)	Anthony Mosca (115)
Most wickets	Matthew Humphreys (6)	Grant Stewart (6)

=== 1st T20I ===
23 January 2026
10:00
Scorecard

Italy; 118 (18.1 overs)	v	Ireland; 119/7 (19.3 overs)
Anthony Mosca 35 (22); Matthew Humphreys 4/12 (4 overs)		Harry Tector 41 (40); Grant Stewart 3/21 (4 overs)

Ireland won by 3 wickets
The Sevens Stadium, Dubai
Umpires: Akbar Ali (UAE) and Shiju Sam (UAE)

- Ireland won the toss and elected to field.
- JJ Smuts played his first T20I for Italy after having previously played 13 T20Is for South Africa, becoming the 23rd cricketer to represent two international teams in men's T20Is.
- This was the first men's T20I to be played at this venue.

=== 2nd T20I ===
25 January 2026
10:00
Scorecard

Ireland; 190/5 (20 overs)	v	Italy; 166/4 (20 overs)
Harry Tector 96* (56); Crishan Kalugamage 1/27 (3 overs)		Anthony Mosca 69 (48); Barry McCarthy 2/43 (4 overs)

Ireland won by 24 runs
The Sevens Stadium, Dubai
Umpires: Akbar Ali (UAE) and Aasif Iqbal (UAE)

- Italy won the toss and elected to field.

=== 3rd T20I ===
26 January 2026
18:00 (N)
Scorecard

Ireland; 154 (19.4 overs)	v	Italy; 157/6 (19.3 overs)
Paul Stirling 45 (38); Crishan Kalugamage 3/28 (4 overs)		Wayne Madsen 39 (30); Mark Adair 2/23 (4 overs); Matthew Humphreys 2/23 (4 overs)

Italy won by 4 wickets
The Sevens Stadium, Dubai
Umpires: Aasif Iqbal (UAE) and Shiju Sam (UAE)

- Italy won the toss and elected to field.
- This was Italy's first win against a full member side in men's T20I cricket.

== Ireland v UAE T20I series ==
Irish cricket team in the UAE in 2025–26
	United Arab Emirates	Ireland
- Dates: 29 – 31 January 2026
Captains	Muhammad Waseem	Paul Stirling

Twenty20 International series
- Results: Ireland won the 2-match series 2–0
Most runs	Aryansh Sharma (77)	Curtis Campher (79)
Most wickets	Haider Ali (4); Junaid Siddique (4)	Gareth Delany (5)

=== 1st T20I ===
29 January 2026
18:00 (N)
Scorecard

Ireland; 178/6 (20 overs)	v	United Arab Emirates; 121 (19.5 overs)
Ross Adair 39 (29); Haider Ali 2/31 (4 overs)		Muhammad Waseem 40 (37); Gareth Delany 3/26 (4 overs); Matthew Humphreys 3/26 (4 overs)

Ireland won by 57 runs
Dubai International Cricket Stadium, Dubai
Umpires: Akbar Ali (UAE) and Shiju Sam (UAE)
Player of the match: Gareth Delany (Ire)

- Ireland won the toss and elected to bat.
- Paul Stirling (Ire) became most capped player of all time, in T20Is.

=== 2nd T20I ===
31 January 2026
10:00
Scorecard

Ireland; 170/7 (20 overs)	v	United Arab Emirates; 140/8 (20 overs)
Curtis Campher 54* (41); Muhammad Arfan 2/23 (4 overs)		Aryansh Sharma 54 (40); George Dockrell 2/12 (3 overs)

Ireland won by 30 runs
Dubai International Cricket Stadium, Dubai
Umpires: Akbar Ali (UAE) and Aasif Iqbal (UAE)
Player of the match: Curtis Campher (Ire)

- United Arab Emirates won the toss and elected to field.
