= 2026 Cricket World Cup Challenge League B (Tanzania) =

Cricket tournament

2026 Tanzania Cricket World Cup Challenge League B
- Dates: 8 – 18 August 2026
- Administrator: International Cricket Council
- Cricket format: List A
- Tournament format: Round-robin
- Host: Tanzania
- Participants: 6
- Matches: 15
- Most runs: (Uganda) Raghav Dhawan (204)
- Most wickets: (Italy) Crishan Kalugamage (14)

The 2026 Tanzania Cricket World Cup Challenge League B was the third round of Group B matches of the 2024–2026 Cricket World Cup Challenge League, a cricket tournament which formed part of the qualification pathway to the 2027 Cricket World Cup. The tournament was hosted by the Tanzania Cricket Association in August 2026, with all matches having List A status.

== Bahrain in Kenya ==
Prior to the start of the Challenge League fixtures, the Bahrain toured Kenya for two 50-over one day matches and two Twenty20 International (T20I) matches against the Kenya from 31 July to 5 August 2026. The second 50-over match had List A status.

Bahrain cricket team in Kenya in 2026
	Kenya	Bahrain
- Dates: 31 July – 5 August 2026
Captains	Dhiren Gondaria	Asif Ali

Twenty20 International series
- Results: 2-match series drawn 1–1
Most runs	Dhiren Gondaria (96)	Fiaz Ahmed (153)
Most wickets	Peter Langat (3)	Rizwan Butt (6)

LA series
- Result: 2-match series drawn 1–1
Most runs	Sukhdeep Singh (149)	Ahmer Bin Nasir (93)
Most wickets	Lucas Oluoch (4); Yash Talati (4)	Asif Shaikh (5)

=== T20I fixtures ===
31 July 2026
15:30
Scorecard

Bahrain; 159/4 (20 overs)	v	Kenya; 144/8 (20 overs)
Fiaz Ahmed 88 (49); Sachin Gill 2/20 (4 overs)		Dhiren Gondaria 73 (49); Rizwan Butt 4/17 (4 overs)

Bahrain won by 15 runs
Gymkhana Club Ground, Nairobi
Umpires: Charles Kariuki (Ken) and Shashikant Sanghani (Ken)
Player of the match: Fiaz Ahmed (Bhr)

- Bahrain won the toss and elected to bat.

1 August 2026
15:30
Scorecard

Bahrain; 148/5 (20 overs)	v	Kenya; 149/9 (20 overs)
Fiaz Ahmed 65* (48); Peter Langat 2/18 (4 overs)		Sachin Gill 26 (17); Asif Shaikh 2/22 (4 overs)

Kenya won by 1 wicket
Gymkhana Club Ground, Nairobi
Umpires: David Odhiambo (Ken) and Isaac Oyieko (Ken)
Player of the match: Shem Ngoche (Ken)

- Kenya won the toss and elected to field.

=== One-day fixtures ===
3 August 2026
12:00
Scorecard

Bahrain; 250/9 (50 overs)	v	Kenya; 255/5 (43.3 overs)
Sohail Ahmed 52 (69); Yash Talati 4/37 (10 overs)		Sukhdeep Singh 140* (121); Ali Dawood 4/34 (9 overs)

Kenya won by 3 wickets
Gymkhana Club Ground, Nairobi
Umpires: Paul Anjere (Ken) and Nicholas Otieno (Ken)
Player of the match: Sukhdeep Singh (Ken)

- Kenya won the toss and elected to field.

5 August 2026
12:00
Scorecard

Bahrain; 273/8 (50 overs)	v	Kenya; 206 (44.2 overs)
Asif Ali 86 (101); Lucas Oluoch 2/41 (7 overs)		Sachin Gill 61 (59); Asif Shaikh 5/53 (10 overs)

Bahrain won by 67 runs
Gymkhana Club Ground, Nairobi
Umpires: Benard Agutu (Ken) and Charles Kariuki (Ken)
Player of the match: Asif Shaikh (Ken)

- Kenya won the toss and elected to field.
- Nitish Hirani (Ken), Amaish Rana and Muhammad Safdar (Bhr) all made their List A debuts.

== Warm-up matches ==
Hong Kong, Tanzania and Uganda played each other in List A matches ahead of the Challenge League fixtures. Italy played a warm-up match against a Tanzania A side.

Tanzania Warm-up matches

1 August 2026
09:30
Scorecard

Tanzania; 190 (38 overs)	v	Hong Kong; 191/5 (45.5 overs)
Omary Kitunda 41 (41); Yasim Murtaza 4/42 (10 overs)		Anshuman Rath 54 (70); Laksh Bakrania 4/20 (10 overs)

Hong Kong won by 5 wickets
Annadil Burhani Ground, Dar-es-Salaam
Umpires: Adil Kassam (Tan) and Rajesh Pillai (Ken)
Player of the match: Yasim Murtaza (HK)

- Tanzania won the toss and elected to bat.
- Ajith Augastin, Abhishek Kumar, Dhrumit Mehta and Arun Yadav (Tan) all made their List A debuts.

3 August 2026
09:30
Scorecard

Tanzania; 158 (39.3 overs)	v	Hong Kong; 159/3 (32.3 overs)
Omary Kitunda 41 (50); Mohammad Ghazanfar 4/37 (9.3 overs)		Babar Hayat 65 (85); Salum Jumbe 2/19 (4 overs)

Hong Kong won by 7 wickets
University of Dar es Salaam Ground 1, Dar-es-Salaam
Umpires: Aahil Jasani (Tan) and Rajesh Pillai (Ken)
Player of the match: Babar Hayat (HK)

- Tanzania won the toss and elected to bat.
- Shaik Basha (Tan) and Hafeez Khan (HK) both made their List A debuts.

4 August 2026
09:30
Scorecard

Uganda; 314/5 (50 overs)	v	Tanzania; 211 (48.2 overs)
Sumeet Verma 106 (114); Ally Kimote 3/68 (10 overs)		Dhrumit Mehta 41 (37); Alpesh Ramjani 2/32 (8 overs)

Uganda won by 103 runs
University of Dar es Salaam Ground 2, Dar-es-Salaam
Umpires: Adil Kassam (Tan) and Rajesh Pillai (Ken)
Player of the match: Sumeet Verma (Uga)

- Uganda won the toss and elected to bat.
- Raymond Francis (Tan), Joseph Baguma and Cyrus Kakuru (Uga) all made their List A debuts.

5 August 2026
09:30
Scorecard

Italy; 263/7 (39.1 overs)	v	Tanzania A 156 (38 overs)
Anthony Mosca 105 (95); Ajay Yadav 2/47 (8 overs)		Arshan Jasani 82 (97); Zain Ali 2/24 (8 overs)

Italy won by 107 runs
Annadil Burhani Ground, Dar-es-Salaam
Player of the match: Anthony Mosca (Ita)

- Italy won the toss and elected to bat.

6 August 2026
09:30
Scorecard

Uganda; 213 (48.2 overs)	v	Hong Kong; 100 (31.3 overs)
Sumeet Verma 58 (61); Babar Hayat 3/41 (10 overs)		Anshuman Rath 33 (43); Joseph Baguma 5/23 (8 overs)

Uganda won by 113 runs
Annadil Burhani Ground, Dar-es-Salaam
Umpires: Adil Kassam (Tan) and Rajesh Pillai (Ken)
Player of the match: Joseph Baguma (Uga)

- Uganda won the toss and elected to bat.
- Mohammad Waheed (HK) and Olipa Gerald (Uga) both made their List A debuts.

== Squads ==
Bahrain	Hong Kong	Italy	Singapore	Tanzania	Uganda
Asif Ali (c); Fiaz Ahmed; Sohail Ahmed; Imran Anwar; Junaid Aziz; Rizwan Butt; Ali Dawood; Prashant Kurup (wk); Abdul Majid; Ahmer Bin Nasir; Amaish Rana; Shujaat Rasool; Muhammad Safdar; Asif Shaikh	Yasim Murtaza (c); Babar Hayat (vc); Zeeshan Ali (wk); Martin Coetzee; Mohammad Ghazanfar; Ateeq Iqbal; Aizaz Khan; Ehsan Khan; Hafeez Khan; Hassan Khan Mohammad; Nasrulla Rana; Anshuman Rath; Mohammad Waheed; Shahid Wasif (wk)	Harry Manenti (c); Zain Ali; Marcus Campopiano; Marco Giaconi; Ali Hasan; Rakibul Hasan; Crishan Kalugamage; Nicholas Maiolo; Ben Manenti; Gian-Piero Meade (wk); Anthony Mosca; Justin Mosca; Akash Senaratne; Jaspreet Singh	Manpreet Singh (c); Mahiyu Bhatia (vc); Umair Aftab; Kabir Berlia; Suryansh Gulecha; Girin Gune; Aarkin Kessar; Hari Kukreja; Riaan Naik; Mason Arthur Sherry; Harman Singh; Chandramauli Sridev; Raheel Thakkar (wk); Harsh Venkatram	Kassim Nassoro (c); Ajith Augastin; Laksh Bakrania; Shaik Basha; Raymond Francis; Khalidy Juma; Salum Jumbe; Ally Kimote; Omary Kitunda (wk); Abhishek Kumar; Dhrumit Mehta; Ivan Selemani; Mukesh Suthar; Arun Yadav	Riazat Ali Shah (c); Kenneth Waiswa (vc); Fred Achelam (wk); Joseph Baguma; Raghav Dhawan; Cyrus Kakuru (wk); Cosmas Kyewuta; Juma Miyagi; Dinesh Nakrani; Gerald Olipa; Alpesh Ramjani; Henry Ssenyondo; Simon Ssesazi; Sumeet Verma

== Fixtures ==
8 August 2026
09:30
Scorecard

Uganda; 142/8 (20 overs)	v	Tanzania; 71 (17.4 overs)
Raghav Dhawan 43 (30); Ajith Augastin 4/17 (3 overs)		Dhrumit Mehta 24 (15); Henry Ssenyondo 3/7 (4 overs)

Uganda won by 90 runs (DLS method)
University of Dar es Salaam Ground 1, Dar es Salaam
Umpires: Iknow Chabi (Zim) and Langton Rusere (Zim)
Player of the match: Henry Ssenyondo (Uga)

- Uganda won the toss and elected to bat.
- Tanzania were set a revised target of 162 runs in 20 overs due to rain.

9 August 2026
09:30
Scorecard

Italy; 200 (49.2 overs)	v	Bahrain; 132 (41.1 overs)
Justin Mosca 31 (51); Asif Shaikh 4/37 (10 overs)		Asif Ali 33 (51); Crishan Kalugamage 4/36 (7.1 overs)

Italy won by 68 runs
University of Dar es Salaam Ground 1, Dar es Salaam
Umpires: Adil Kassam (Tan) and Shiju Sam (UAE)
Player of the match: Crishan Kalugamage (Ita)

- Italy won the toss and elected to bat.
- Shujaat Rasool (Bhr) made his List A debut.
- Bahrain were eliminated as a result of this match.

9 August 2026
09:30
Scorecard

Hong Kong; 289/7 (50 overs)	v	Singapore; 126 (32.2 overs)
Anshuman Rath 91 (107); Manpreet Singh 2/44 (10 overs)		Manpreet Singh 42 (51); Mohammad Ghazanfar 3/17 (5.2 overs)

Hong Kong won by 163 runs
University of Dar es Salaam Ground 2, Dar es Salaam
Umpires: Akbar Ali (UAE) and Habib Enesi (Nga)
Player of the match: Anshuman Rath (HK)

- Singapore won the toss and elected to field.
- Kabir Berlia, Mahiyu Bhatia, Girin Gune, Aarkin Kessar, Chandramouli Sridev, Raheel Thakkar and Harsh Venkataram (Sin) all made their List A debuts.
- Babar Hayat and Anshuman Rath (HK) both scored their 2000th run in List A cricket.
- Aizaz Khan (HK) scored his 1000th run in List A cricket.

11 August 2026
09:30
Scorecard

Tanzania; 99 (38.3 overs)	v	Hong Kong; 100/4 (21.2 overs)
Ajith Augastin 33 (53); Mohammad Ghazanfar 4/19 (9 overs)		Ehsan Khan 34* (49); Laksh Bakrania 3/49 (10 overs)

Hong Kong won by 6 wickets
University of Dar es Salaam Ground 1, Dar es Salaam
Umpires: Langton Rusere (Zim) and Shiju Sam (UAE)
Player of the match: Mohammad Ghazanfar (HK)

- Tanzania won the toss and elected to bat.

11 August 2026
09:30
Scorecard

Italy; 192/9 (50 overs)	v	Uganda; 79 (31.1 overs)
Justin Mosca 29 (54); Sumeet Verma 4/49 (10 overs)		Olipa Gerald 19 (32); Rakibul Hasan 6/18 (10 overs)

Italy won by 113 runs
University of Dar es Salaam Ground 2, Dar es Salaam
Umpires: Iknow Chabi (Zim) and Adil Kassam (Tan)
Player of the match: Rakibul Hasan (Ita)

- Italy won the toss and elected to bat.

12 August 2026
09:30
Scorecard

Singapore; 76 (21.3 overs)	v	Bahrain; 79/3 (14.5 overs)
Suryansh Gulecha 25 (22); Abdul Majid 6/18 (9.3 overs)		Prashant Kurup 31* (41); Suryansh Gulecha 2/29 (6 overs)

Bahrain won by 7 wickets
University of Dar es Salaam Ground 1, Dar es Salaam
Umpires: Akbar Ali (UAE) and Langton Rusere (Zim)
Player of the match: Abdul Majid (Bhr)

- Singapore won the toss and elected to bat.
- Mason Arthur Sherry (Sin) made his List A debut.
- Abdul Majid (Bhr) became the first player for Bahrain to take a five-wicket haul in List A cricket.

12 August 2026
09:30
Scorecard

Hong Kong; 170 (50 overs)	v	Uganda; 119 (36.5 overs)
Anshuman Rath 50 (52); Henry Ssenyondo 3/29 (10 overs)		Olipa Gerald 60 (101); Mohammad Ghazanfar 3/39 (8 overs)

Hong Kong won by 51 runs
University of Dar es Salaam Ground 2, Dar es Salaam
Umpires: Iknow Chabi (Zim) and Habib Enesi (Nga)
Player of the match: Anshuman Rath (HK)

- Hong Kong won the toss and elected to bat.

14 August 2026
09:30
Scorecard

Hong Kong; 228 (49.5 overs)	v	Bahrain; 190/7 (50 overs)
Babar Hayat 88 (128); Asif Ali 4/54 (9.5 overs)		Ahmer Bin Nasir 61 (111); Yasim Murtaza 3/30 (10 overs)

Hong Kong won by 38 runs
University of Dar es Salaam Ground 1, Dar es Salaam
Umpires: Akbar Ali (UAE) and Shiju Sam (UAE)
Player of the match: Yasim Murtaza (HK)

- Hong Kong won the toss and elected to bat.

14 August 2026
09:30
Scorecard

Singapore; 170 (48.4 overs)	v	Italy; 172/3 (38.3 overs)
Suryansh Gulecha 48 (52); Jaspreet Singh 3/17 (5.4 overs)		Anthony Mosca 57 (94); Suryansh Gulecha 1/35 (10 overs)

Italy won by 7 wickets
University of Dar es Salaam Ground 2, Dar es Salaam
Umpires: Habib Enesi (Nga) and Adil Kassam (Tan)
Player of the match: Anthony Mosca (Ita)

- Singapore won the toss and elected to bat.

15 August 2026
09:30
Scorecard

Singapore; 175 (40 overs)	v	Uganda; 176/2 (32.5 overs)
Manpreet Singh 50 (69); Juma Miyagi 4/22 (8 overs)		Raghav Dhawan 77* (97); Aarkin Kessar 1/26 (5 overs)

Uganda won by 8 wickets
University of Dar es Salaam Ground 1, Dar es Salaam
Umpires: Adil Kassam (Tan) and Langton Rusere (Zim)
Player of the match: Raghav Dhawan (Uga)

- Singapore won the toss and elected to bat.
- The match was reduced to 40 overs per side due to rain.

15 August 2026
09:30
Scorecard

Bahrain; 116 (32.2 overs)	v	Tanzania; 120/5 (27.2 overs)
Fiaz Ahmed 41 (73); Abhishek Kumar 4/30 (6 overs)		Arun Yadav 32 (43); Rizwan Butt 3/19 (7 overs)

Tanzania won by 5 wickets
University of Dar es Salaam Ground 2, Dar es Salaam
Umpires: Iknow Chabi (Zim) and Shiju Sam (UAE)
Player of the match: Abhishek Kumar (Tan)

- Bahrain won the toss and elected to bat.
- The match was reduced to 42 overs per side due to rain.

17 August 2026
09:30
Scorecard

Hong Kong; 174 (49.1 overs)	v	Italy; 175/4 (46 overs)
Zeeshan Ali 57 (61); Crishan Kalugamage 3/30 (10 overs)		Marcus Campopiano 74* (144); Ehsan Khan 2/27 (9 overs)

Italy won by 6 wickets
University of Dar es Salaam Ground 1, Dar es Salaam
Umpires: Arsalaan Premji (Tan) and Langton Rusere (Zim)
Player of the match: Marcus Campopiano (Ita)

- Hong Kong won the toss and elected to bat.

17 August 2026
09:30
Scorecard

Singapore; 103 (29.5 overs)	v	Tanzania; 106/1 (17 overs)
Riaan Naik 35 (42); Abhishek Kumar 5/15 (7.5 overs)		Dhrumit Mehta 48* (43); Kabir Berlia 1/26 (3 overs)

Tanzania won by 9 wickets
University of Dar es Salaam Ground 2, Dar es Salaam
Umpires: Akbar Ali (UAE) and Iknow Chabi (Zim)
Player of the match: Abhishek Kumar (Tan)

- Tanzania won the toss and elected to field.

18 August 2026
09:30
Scorecard

Tanzania; 142 (37.3 overs)	v	Italy; 143/2 (25.5 overs)
Dhrumit Mehta 39 (59); Akash Senaratne 5/21 (9.3 overs)		Anthony Mosca 75* (71); Laksh Bakrania 1/33 (5.5 overs)

Italy won by 8 wickets
University of Dar es Salaam Ground 1, Dar es Salaam
Umpires: Akbar Ali (UAE) and Shiju Sam (UAE)
Player of the match: Akash Senaratne (Ita)

- Tanzania won the toss and elected to bat.

18 August 2026
09:30
Scorecard

Uganda; 204 (48.1 overs)	v	Bahrain; 209/6 (49.4 overs)
Raghav Dhawan 80 (109); Asif Shaikh 3/42 (8.1 overs)		Fiaz Ahmed 78* (121); Joseph Baguma 2/31 (9 overs)

Bahrain won by 4 wickets
University of Dar es Salaam Ground 2, Dar es Salaam
Umpires: Adil Kassam (Tan) and Arsalaan Premji (Tan)
Player of the match: Fiaz Ahmed (Bhr)

- Bahrain won the toss and elected to field.
