= John Manenti =

Australian rugby coach (born 1971)

- Born: 30 March 1971 (age 55)
- Notable relative(s): Ben Manenti (son); Harry Manenti (son)

Rugby union career
Senior career
Years	Team	Apps	(Points)
1992–1996	Western Suburbs		
1997–2001	Sydney University		
Coaching career
- Years: Team
- 2026–pres.: Sydney University
- 2025: San Diego Legion
- 2022–24: Australia 7s
- 2018–21: Australia women's 7s
- 2011–18: Eastwood
- 2017: Greater Sydney Rams
- 2009–10: Australia women

John Manenti (born 30 March 1971) is an Australian rugby union coach. He is currently head coach of the Sydney University Football Club. Manenti achieved coaching success in international rugby sevens, winning the World Rugby Sevens Series twice for Australia, firstly with the women's team in 2018, and then with the men's team in 2022.

== Career ==
As a rugby player, Manenti was a prop for Sydney clubs Western Suburbs and Sydney University in the 1990s. Manenti and Sydney University's former head coach Chris Malone are brothers-in-law.

He coached the Wallaroos at the 2010 Women's Rugby World Cup in England, where the team won the bronze medal defeating France 22–8 in the third place match. He was head coach at Eastwood for their three Shute Shield victories in 2011, 2014 and 2015, and also won the Australian Club Championship with Eastwood in 2015.

In 2017, Manenti coached the Greater Sydney Rams in the National Rugby Championship, following the takeover of the franchise by the Eastwood Rugby Club. He later became the director of rugby at Eastwood.

After Tim Walsh departed to coach the national men's sevens team in 2018, Manenti was appointed head coach of the national women's sevens team. In 2022 he swapped roles with Walsh and became head coach of the Australian men's sevens team.

Manenti was head coach of the San Diego Legion in Major League Rugby in 2025, before returning to Australia to take up the dual role of director of rugby and head coach at Sydney University ahead of the 2026 season.

=== Coaching honours ===
Australia men's 7s

- World Rugby Sevens Series
  - Winner: 2021–22

Wallaroos

- Rugby World Cup
  - Bronze medal: 2010

Australia women's 7s

- World Rugby Sevens Series
  - Winner: 2017–18
  - Runner-up: 2020

Eastwood

- Australian Club Championship
  - Winner: 2015
- Shute Shield
  - Winner: 2011, 2014 and 2015

== Personal life ==
His sons Ben Manenti and Harry Manenti are both cricketers.
