= Sukhdeep Singh (cricketer) =

Kenyan cricketer

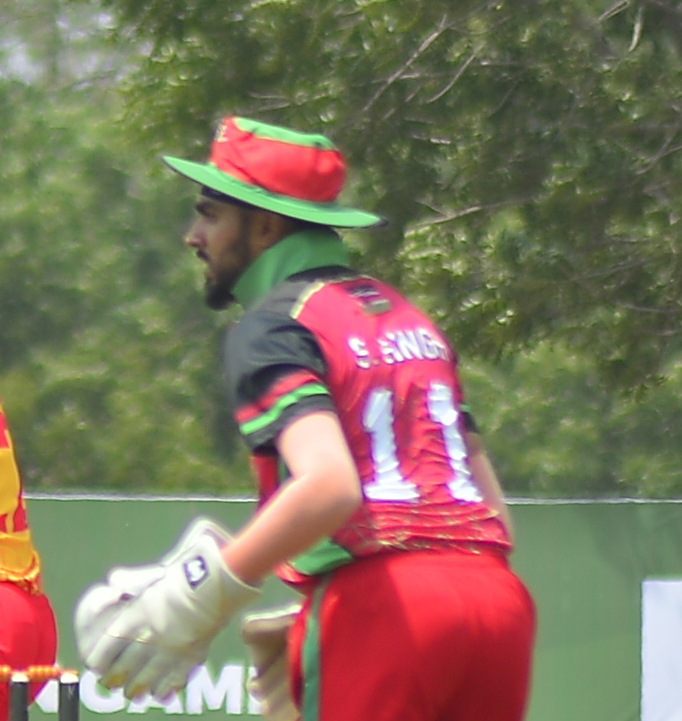
- 2023 African Games

Personal information
- Born: 11 February 2001 (age 25); Nairobi, Kenya
- Batting: Right-handed
- Bowling: Right-arm off break
- Role: Wicket-keeper

International information
- National side: Kenya
- T20I debut (cap 39): November 17 2021 v Uganda
- Last T20I: 17 July 2024 v Nigeria

Career statistics
Competition	T20I
Matches	42
Runs scored	545
Batting average	20.18
100s/50s	0/1
Top score	54*
Catches/stumpings	24/8
- Source: CricInfo

Sukhdeep Singh (born 11 February 2001) is a Kenyan cricketer. He is pursuing a degree in commerce from the Strathmore University.

== Career ==
He was selected for the Kenyan side in the 2018 Under-19 Cricket World Cup. He was named captain of the team ahead of the world cup qualifier.
