= Italian Cricket Federation =

Governing body of cricket within Italy

- Sport: Cricket
- Jurisdiction: Cricket in Italy
- Abbreviation: ICF
- Founded: 1980; 46 years ago
- Affiliation: International Cricket Council
- Affiliation date: 1984; 42 years ago
- Regional affiliation: ICC Europe
- Affiliation date: 1997; 29 years ago
- Headquarters: Rome, Italy
- President: Fabio Marabini
- Vice president: Maria Lorena Haz Paz
- Secretary: Kelum Asanka Perera
- Sponsor: Macron

Official website
- www.cricketitalia.org
- (Italy)

The Italian Cricket Federation (Italian: Federazione Cricket Italiana) is the governing body for the sport of cricket within Italy. It is responsible, with assistance from the ICC Europe (earlier the European Cricket Council), for the development and administration of the game within Italy, and the selection of the Italian national cricket team.

The Italian Cricket Federation also runs an academy for youth development located 180 km north of Rome, at Grosseto Cricket Club.

== History ==
The history of Italian cricket is largely unknown to the rest of the world. The sport was first introduced to Italy in the early 1800s by the British expatriates living in the country. The game quickly caught on among the Italian elite, and cricket clubs were soon popping up all over the country.

In 1793, Admiral Horatio Nelson organised Italy's first-ever recorded game in Naples.

One of the earliest and most influential cricket clubs was the Rome Cricket Club, which was founded in 1820 by a group of wealthy English and Italian cricket enthusiasts. The club quickly became the hub of Italian cricket and attracted players from all over the country.

By the mid-1800s, Italian cricket had become so popular that the country was invited to participate in the first-ever international cricket tournament, which was held in London in 1851. Despite being relative newcomers to the sport, the Italian team managed to hold their own against more experienced teams from England, Australia, and India, and even won a few matches.

Throughout the rest of the 19th century, Italian cricket continued to thrive and grow, with new clubs and leagues popping up all over the country. The sport even gained some political influence, with prominent politicians and members of the royal family becoming avid cricket enthusiasts and patrons of the sport.

However, the early 20th century saw a decline in Italian cricket, as the country was swept up in World War I and World War II. Many cricket clubs were forced to disband, and the sport lost much of its popularity and support.

Today, Italian cricket is largely a forgotten relic of the past, with only a handful of cricket clubs still active in the country.

The Italian Cricket Federation has been an associate member of the International Cricket Council since 1995, having previously been an affiliate member since 1984.

== Domestic cricket ==
- Ayubowan Mantua CC
- Azzurra
- Bologna CC
- Castle CC
- Casteller Cricket Club Paese
- Ceylon Cricket Club Padova
- Eagles CC
- Euratom Cricket Club
- Fiorentina Cricket Club
- Gallicano
- Genoa CC (i grifoni)
- Gruppo Lazio B. S. & Cricket
- Guidizzolo CC
- Hockey Club Butterfly
- Howzat Cricket & Sports Academy
- IB CC
- Idle CC
- Karalis Cricket Club
- Latina Lanka CC
- Lions Brescia
- Maremma CC
- Messapia Cricket Taranto
- Milan CC
- Milan Kingsgrove CC
- Modugno Cricket
- tal Bangla Boys CC
- PakFriends Cricket Club Trentino Alto-Adige
- Parma Jinnah CC
- Pianoro CC
- P.G.S. Lux
- Pol. Excelsior 2000
- Polisportiva Città2Mari
- Polisportiva Gambassi
- Polisportiva Università Tor Vergata
- Renato Moro Taranto Cricket
- Roma Capannelle Cricket Club
- Rome Bangla CC
- Rovereto CC
- Sinhala Sports Club Viterbo
- Smit Roma Centro
- Sporting Club Judicaria
- Sri Lanka Cricket Club Libertas
- Stradaioli Cricket Club Aprilia
- Trentino CC
- Tuscolana Cricket Club
- Unione Polisportiva Narnese Cricket
- Venezia CC
- Gardone CC
- Jaguars Parma CC
- LuxRoma Cricket Club
- Diffendes sporting club

== See also ==
- Italian national cricket team
- Cricket in Italy
