= Justin Mosca =

Italian cricketer (born 1994)

Personal information
- Full name: Justin Mosca
- Born: 15 November 1994 (age 32)
- Batting: Left-handed
- Bowling: Right-arm medium
- Role: Opening batter
- Relatives: Anthony Mosca (brother)

International information
- National side: Italy
- T20I debut (cap 30): 12 July 2022 v Greece
- Last T20I: 12 February 2026 v Nepal
- T20I shirt no.: 62

Career statistics
Competition	T20I	LA	T20
Matches	21	9	21
Runs scored	381	145	381
Batting average	20.05	16.11	20.05
100s/50s	0/3	0/0	0/3
Top score	72	43	72
Catches/stumpings	8/–	4/–	8/–
- Source: Cricinfo, 12 February 2026

Justin Mosca (born 15 November 1994) is an Australian-born Italian cricketer who plays for the Italy national cricket team in Twenty20 Internationals. He is a top order batter who also bowls right arm medium pace. Mosca was part of the Italy squad that qualified for the 2026 ICC Men's T20 World Cup, Italy's first appearance at a men's cricket World Cup.

== Early life and education ==
Mosca grew up in Moorebank in south west Sydney in an Italian Australian family who migrated to Australia in the 20th century.

Mosca later enrolled in a teaching course in Australia and worked as a physical education teacher while continuing to play cricket.

== Career ==
Mosca began his cricket career for Italy when Italy players contacted him before the COVID-19 pandemic, with travel restrictions delaying his involvement until 2022. Both brothers play for Campbelltown in NSW Premier Cricket.

Mosca made his Twenty20 International debut for Italy against Greece on 12 July 2022 at Tikkurila Cricket Ground in Vantaa, Finland. He contributed to Italy's qualification campaign through European tournaments in 2024 and 2025. In June 2024, he scored 28 against Luxembourg in Rome during the ICC Men's T20 World Cup Europe Qualifier A event. Later in the same tournament, he scored 72 in the final against Romania as Italy won the event and advanced in the qualification pathway.

in July 2025, Italy secured qualification for the 2026 ICC Men's T20 World Cup through the Europe pathway. During the Europe Regional Final, Mosca made 66 not out against Guernsey in a seven-wicket win. Before the World Cup, Mosca played a warm up match in Chennai against the United Arab Emirates and scored 48 before retiring out, as Italy won by 112 runs.

== Personal life ==
The brothers grew up in the Sydney suburbs in the Italian-Australian community, alongside the Manenti brothers (Benjamin and Harry). Mosca is based in Sydney and works as a physical education teacher at Sacred Heart Catholic Primary School in Cabramatta. He enrolled in a teaching course following encouragement from his girlfriend, who later became his wife. During the 2026 tournament, his wife was reported to be pregnant so couldn't be present, but organised a viewing event in a Camden pub for family and friends.

Mosca is also an Italian football fan who supports A.C. Milan, and Liverpool in the Premier League.
