= Thomas Draca =

Italian cricketer (born 2000)

Personal information
- Full name: Thomas Jack Draca
- Born: 23 October 2000 (age 26); Sydney, Australia
- Batting: Right-handed
- Bowling: Right arm medium
- Role: Bowler

International information
- National side: Italy
- T20I debut (cap 28): 9 June 2024 v Luxembourg
- Last T20I: 9 February 2026 v Scotland

Domestic team information
- Years: Team
- 2025–: MI Emirates
- 2025–: Lumbini Lions
- 2024: Brampton Wolves

Career statistics
Competition	T20I	LA	T20
Matches	9	2	9
Runs scored	4	–	4
Batting average	–	–	–
100s/50s	0/0	–/–	0/0
Top score	4*	–	4*
Balls bowled	186	78	186
Wickets	11	2	11
Bowling average	17.72	28.50	17.72
5 wickets in innings	0	0	0
10 wickets in match	0	0	0
Best bowling	3/9	1/21	3/9
Catches/stumpings	2/–	0/–	2/–
- Source: CricInfo, 25 January 2026

Thomas Jack Draca (born 23 October 2000) is an Australian-born Italian cricketer who plays for the Italy national cricket team primarily as a bowler. He made his Twenty20 International (T20I) debut on 9 June 2025 against Luxembourg.

== Early life ==
Draca was born on 23 October 2000 in Sydney, Australia, where he first took up the sport. During his teenage years, he was mentored by former Australian pacer Dennis Lillee, with whom he shares a close bond and whom he fondly calls “uncle”.

He started his cricketing career at the age of seven, playing grade for the Blacktown Grade Cricket Club in Sydney. However, later he moved to South Australia to better his opportunities and continue his development.

In 2021, he moved to the United Kingdom, where he currently trains at the University of Exeter while also pursuing a course in marketing and business management.

== Franchise cricket career ==
Draca has been part of a number of leagues around the world. He bagged his first franchise deal in 2024, where he was added as an injury replacement for the Brampton Wolves at the 2024 Global T20 Canada. He finished the season as the highest wicket-taker for the team, scalping 11 wickets in total.

In 2024, he made the headlines by registering for the 2025 Indian Premier League auction. However, he was not shortlisted.

In 2025, he was picked by the MI Emirates for the 2025 International League T20.

He was also part of Lumbini Lions side during the 2025 Nepal Premier League, but he was unable to pick a single wicket in the season.

== International career ==
Draca is eligible to represent Italy through his Italian-born mother. He made his debut for the Italy national cricket team in June 2025 during the 2024 Men's T20 World Cup Europe Sub-regional Qualifier A. He ended up being the second highest wicket-taker for the team, with 8 wickets including his best figures of 3/9 against Isle of Man.

In August 2025, he was part of the historic Italian side that qualified for the 2026 ICC Men's T20 World Cup. Following this qualification, in January 2026, he was named in Italy's squad for the World Cup.
