= Crishan Kalugamage =

Sri Lankan-born Italian cricketer

Personal information
- Full name: Crishan Jorge Priyantha Fernando Kalugamage
- Born: 16 June 1991 (age 35); Marawila, Sri Lanka
- Batting: Right-handed
- Bowling: Right-arm legbreak googly
- Role: Bowler

International information
- National side: Italy
- T20I debut (cap 27): 12 July 2022 v Greece
- Last T20I: 19 February 2026 v West Indies
- T20I shirt no.: 99

Domestic team information
- Years: Team
- 2021–present: Roma Cricket Club
- 2026–present: Colombo Kaps

Career statistics
Competition	T20I	LA	T20
Matches	22	19	25
Runs scored	30	127	35
Batting average	10.00	18.14	5.83
100s/50s	0/0	0/1	0/0
Top score	7	50	7
Balls bowled	431	827	491
Wickets	27	36	30
Bowling average	17.74	17.52	18.76
5 wickets in innings	0	0	0
10 wickets in match	0	0	0
Best bowling	4/17	4/36	4/17
Catches/stumpings	8/–	8/–	9/–
- Source: Cricinfo, 27 September 2026

Crishan Jorge Priyantha Fernando Kalugamage (born 16 June 1991) is a Sri Lankan-born Italian cricketer who plays as a right arm leg spin bowler for the Italy national cricket team. Based in Lucca, he works as a chef in a restaurant and plays domestically for Roma Cricket Club. He is part of Italy squad for the 2026 ICC Men's T20 World Cup.

== Early life and education ==
Kalugamage grew up in Marawila near Negombo on Sri Lanka's west coast, where he played school and street cricket. In 2007, he moved with his family to Tuscany at the age of 15 and settled near Lucca, where formal cricket opportunities were limited.

During his schooling in Italy, he competed in athletics, including long jump, before returning to cricket after being spotted by coach of Roma Cricket Club, he started playing informally and then entered club level cricket. He lives in Lucca and works full time in a local pizzeria while traveling regularly to Rome for training and matches.

== Career ==
=== Domestic career ===
Kalugamage began his career by joining Roma Cricket Club. Early in his senior career, he bowled pace and represented A teams, and briefly played Sri Lankan domestic cricket with Kandy Customs in 2019. After injuries, he returned full time to leg spin in 2021 under the guidance of Roma CC founder Prabath Ekneligoda. He bowls right arm legbreak and googly.

=== International career ===
Kalugamage made his Twenty20 International debut for Italy against Greece at Vantaa on 12 July 2022. He played in Italy's T20 World Cup qualification pathway tournaments in 2024 and 2025 as the team advanced from sub-regional events to the Europe Qualifier, finishing behind the Netherlands to secure a place at the expanded 2026 ICC Men's T20 World Cup. In January 2026, he took wickets in a warm-up tri-series in Dubai that included Italy's first victory over Ireland in T20Is. He entered the World Cup as one of five home-based players in the squad.
