= Grant Stewart (cricketer) =

Italian-Australian cricketer (born 1994)

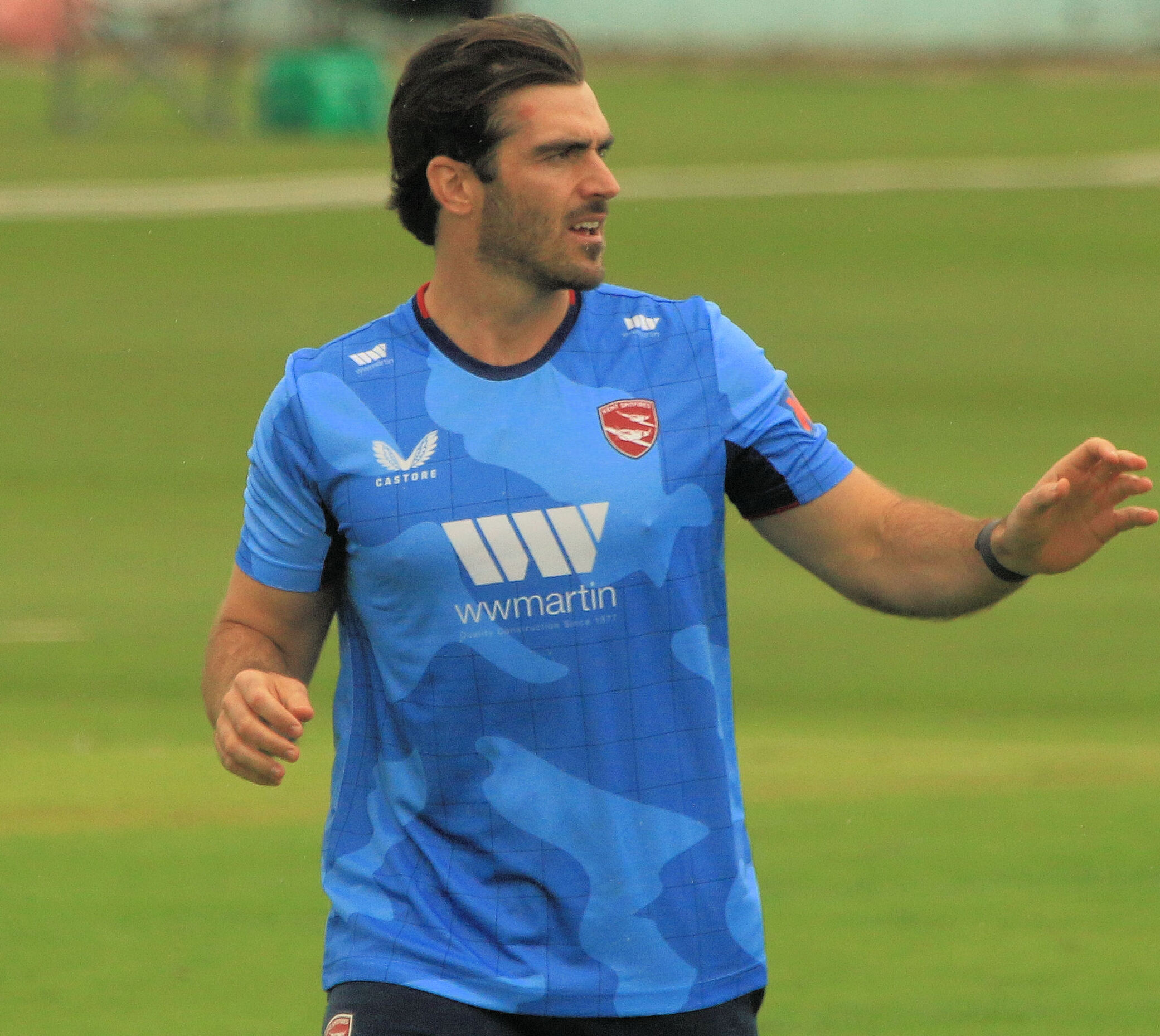
- Stewart in 2023

Personal information
- Born: 19 February 1994 (age 32); Kalgoorlie, Western Australia
- Batting: Right-handed
- Bowling: Right-arm medium-fast
- Role: All-rounder

International information
- National side: Italy
- T20I debut (cap 21): 15 October 2021 v Denmark
- Last T20I: 19 February 2026 v West Indies

Domestic team information
- Years: Team
- 2017–: Kent (squad no. 9)
- 2022: → Sussex (loan) (squad no. 99)

Career statistics
Competition	T20I	FC	LA	T20
Matches	24	63	60	101
Runs scored	532	2,450	882	963
Batting average	28.00	28.16	21.00	18.16
100s/50s	0/3	3/13	0/4	0/3
Top score	76	182	78	76
Balls bowled	430	7,989	2,214	1,751
Wickets	20	111	61	96
Bowling average	24.95	39.94	31.22	27.51
5 wickets in innings	0	2	0	0
10 wickets in match	0	0	0	0
Best bowling	3/21	6/22	4/42	4/32
Catches/stumpings	7/–	11/–	18/–	23/–
- Source: Cricinfo, 27 September 2026

Grant Stewart (born 19 February 1994) is an Australian-Italian cricketer who plays for Kent County Cricket Club. He made his first-class cricket debut for Kent in September 2017 in the club's final County Championship match of the season, after signing his first professional contract at the end of August.

He plays as a bowling all-rounder and has been described as "a big, strong lad who hits it a mile and bowls with reasonable pace" and as having "heaps of natural ability" as a cricketer. In 2021 he made his Twenty20 International debut for Italy, qualifying to play for the team through his Italian mother.

== Early life ==
Stewart was born at Kalgoorlie in Western Australia but grew up in New South Wales, first in Sydney and then in Lorn near Newcastle, living on a turf farm. Stewart attended the University of Newcastle, where he studied civil engineering and worked as a graduate project engineer in Australia. Originally a wicket-keeper and leg-spin bowler, he converted to play as a fast bowler and played for Northern Suburbs Cricket Club in Maitland and Newcastle Cricket Club alongside Kent pace bowler Mitchell Claydon, winning representative honours with the New South Wales Country XI in 2016. Stewart's brother, Luke, occasionally played alongside him at Newcastle.

== Career ==
Stewart was encouraged by Claydon to move to England in 2016 to play cricket in the Kent Cricket League, first with HSBC and then, in 2017, with Sandwich Town. He holds a European Union passport as his mother is Italian, qualifying him to play as a non-overseas player in England. Stewart moved to play for Adelaide University Cricket Club in South Australia during the 2016/17 season and returned to Kent in 2018. After taking 29 wickets during a series of successful performances for the Kent Second XI in 2017, Stewart signed his first professional contract with Kent at the end of August 2017. After making his first-class debut at the end of the 2017 season, he made his first List A appearance during Kent's pre-season campaign at the 2017–18 Regional Super50 competition in the West Indies, taking three wickets against Guyana at the Coolidge Cricket Ground in Antigua.

After starting the season in the first XI, a hamstring injury limited his appearances for Kent at the beginning of their 2018 season. Stewart returned to the team in a day/night match against Middlesex at Canterbury in late June, taking his best bowling figures of 6/22 in a spell during the first evening of the match which reduced Middlesex to 54/9. The following day he scored his maiden first-class century, making 103 runs from 71 balls, the fastest County Championship century of the season, setting a Kent record for the highest score made by a number 10 batsman. Stewart and Ivan Thomas put on a century partnership for the last wicket, Thomas contributing only one run, equalling the lowest contribution made by a batsman to a 100-run partnership.

Injuries limited Stewart's appearances for Kent in 2019 as well, with a hamstring injury suffered in August finally ending his season early. He signed a two-year contract extension in January 2020, keeping him at the club until 2022.

== International career ==
In May 2021, it was announced that Stewart would play for the Italian cricket team in the final stage of the 2021 ICC Men's T20 World Cup Europe Qualifier tournament. In September, he was named in Italy's squad and made his Twenty20 International debut on 15 October against Denmark.

In April 2022, Stewart was loaned to Sussex for a month to provide cover for injured players. He played in one match for the team before being recalled to Kent after an injury to Jackson Bird.

In May 2025, Stewart scored his highest first-class score of 182, which included 20 fours and five sixes, playing against Gloucestershire. He signed a two-year contract extension with Kent on 9 October 2025.

In January 2026, Stewart was named in Italy's squad for the 2026 T20 World Cup.
