= Jaspreet Singh (cricketer) =

Italian cricketer (born 1993)

Personal information
- Born: 9 June 1993 (age 33); Phagwara, Punjab, India
- Batting: Right-handed
- Bowling: Right-arm fast-medium
- Role: All-rounder

International information
- National side: Italy
- T20I debut (cap 23): 15 June 2019 v Norway
- Last T20I: 12 Feb 2026 v Nepal

Career statistics
Competition	T20I	LA	T20
Matches	27	21	27
Runs scored	68	190	68
Batting average	8.50	19.00	8.50
100s/50s	0/0	0/2	0/0
Top score	21	81	21
Balls bowled	401	818	401
Wickets	23	31	23
Bowling average	21.21	21.38	21.21
5 wickets in innings	0	0	0
10 wickets in match	0	0	0
Best bowling	4/9	4/27	4/9
Catches/stumpings	7/–	9/–	7/–
- Source: Cricinfo, 26 January 2026

Jaspreet Singh (born 9 June 1993) is an Indian-born Italian cricketer who plays for the Italy national cricket team. In May 2019, he was named in Italy's squad for the Regional Finals of the 2018–19 ICC T20 World Cup Europe Qualifier tournament in Guernsey. He made his Twenty20 International (T20I) debut for Italy, against Norway, on 15 June 2019.

== Early life ==
Singh was born on 9 June 1993 in Phagwara, Punjab, India. He and his family immigrated to Italy in 2006, settling in Telgate, Lombardy. He played tape-ball cricket as a teenager and later played for the Bergamo Cricket Club. As an adult, he moved to England, where he plays club cricket in the Birmingham & District Premier League.

== International career ==
In November 2019, he was named in Italy's squad for the Cricket World Cup Challenge League B tournament in Oman. He made his List A debut, for Italy against Bermuda, on 12 December 2019. In September 2021, he was named in Italy's T20I squad for the Regional Final of the 2021 ICC Men's T20 World Cup Europe Qualifier tournament.

In January 2026, Singh was named in Italy's squad for the 2026 T20 World Cup.
