= Anthony Mosca =

Italian Australian cricketer

Personal information
- Born: 21 August 1991 (age 35); Sydney, New South Wales, Australia
- Batting: Right-handed
- Role: Opening batter

International information
- National side: Italy
- T20I debut (cap 29): 12 July 2022 v Greece
- Last T20I: 12 February 2026 v Nepal
- T20I shirt no.: 11

Career statistics
| Competition | T20I | LA | T20 |
|---|---|---|---|
| Matches | 18 | 19 | 18 |
| Runs scored | 479 | 582 | 479 |
| Batting average | 39.91 | 36.37 | 39.91 |
| 100s/50s | 0/3 | 2/1 | 0/3 |
| Top score | 78 | 105 | 78 |
| Balls bowled | – | 30 | – |
| Wickets | – | 1 | – |
| Bowling average | – | 48.00 | – |
| 5 wickets in innings | – | 0 | – |
| 10 wickets in match | – | 0 | – |
| Best bowling | – | 1/48 | – |
| Catches/stumpings | 10/– | 10/– | 10/– |
- Source: Cricinfo, 26 January 2026

Anthony Joseph Mosca (born August 21, 1991) is an Italian-Australian cricketer who plays as a right handed top order batter for the Italy national cricket team in Twenty20 internationals. He made his Twenty20 International debut in July 2022 and was later named in Italy's squad for the 2026 ICC Men's T20 World Cup, the country's first appearance at a cricket World Cup. He has opened the batting alongside his younger brother Justin during preparations for the tournament.

== Early life and education ==
Mosca was born on 21 August 1991 and grew up in the Moorebank area of Sydney within the Italian Australian community. His grandparents migrated from Italy to Australia in the mid-20th century, and he was raised in south-west Sydney. He played cricket locally and progressed through New South Wales Premier Cricket before qualifying to represent Italy internationally.

== Career ==
After playing club cricket in Sydney, Mosca joined the Italy setup alongside other players of Italian heritage and made his T20I debut in July 2022 during the European qualification pathway for the T20 World Cup. He was part of the Italy squad that qualified for the 2026 T20 World Cup.

In early 2026, Mosca featured in Italy's warm up and preparatory matches, including a win over the United Arab Emirates in which he top-scored with a half-century.

Domestically, he played for Sydney Cricket Club in the New South Wales Premier Cricket. In 2021, he moved to Hobart to play for New Town in the Cricket Tasmania Premier League.

In the 2026 ICC Men's T20 World Cup, he helped Italy record their first-ever victory in the tournament's history by defeating Nepal at Wankhede Stadium. After bowling Nepal out for 123 runs, Italy chased down the target in just 12.4 overs. Anthony scored 62* off 32 while his brother Justin Mosca scored 60* off 44 as Italy won the match by 10 wickets.

== Personal life ==
Mosca is of Italian descent and grew up in a family that supported the Italy national football team. He and his brother chose cricket as their primary sport. Outside cricket, he worked for over a decade as a carpenter before moving into woodwork teaching at a New South Wales juvenile justice centre.
