= List of Italy Twenty20 International cricketers =

This is a list of Italian Twenty20 International cricketers.

In April 2018, the ICC decided to grant full Twenty20 International (T20I) status to all its members. Therefore, all Twenty20 matches played between Italy and other ICC members from 1 January 2019 would have T20I status.

This list comprises all members of the Italy cricket team who have played at least one T20I match. It is initially arranged in the order in which each player won his first Twenty20 cap. Where more than one player won his first Twenty20 cap in the same match, they are listed alphabetically by surname.

Italy played their first match with T20I status on 25 May 2019 against Germany.

== Key ==
General

- ‡ – Captain
- † – Wicket-keeper
- First – Year of debut
- Last – Year of latest game
- Mat – Number of matches played

Batting

- Runs – Runs scored in career
- HS – Highest score
- Avg – Runs scored per dismissal
- * – Batsman remained not out
- 50 – Half-centuries scored

Bowling

- Balls – Balls bowled in career
- Wkt – Wickets taken in career
- BBI – Best bowling in an innings
- Ave – Average runs per wicket
50

Fielding

- Ca – Catches taken
- St – Stumpings affected

== List of players ==
Statistics are correct as of 19 February 2026.

Italy T20I cricketers
General					Batting					Bowling				Fielding		Ref
No.	Name	First	Last	Mat	Runs	HS	Avg	50	100	Balls	Wkt	BBI	Ave	Ca	St	Ref
1	Shameera Arachchige	2019	2019	4	0	0	0.00	0	0	36	2	2/15	21.00	1	0	
2	Baljit Singh	2019	2022	11	58	45	11.60	0	0	174	12	4/20	12.16	2	0	
3	Fida Hussain	2019	2019	2	3	3*	–	0	0	–	–	–	–	0	0	
4	Nicholas Maiolo	2019	2019	8	106	39*	17.66	0	0	168	7	2/8	21.71	2	0	
5	Manpreet Singh †	2019	2023	20	191	36	17.36	0	0	–	–	–	–	13	7	
6	Gian-Piero Meade ‡†	2019	2026	39	348	59*	15.13	1	0	182	9	3/18	20.77	19	3	
7	Gayashan Munasinghe ‡	2019	2019	8	5	4*	1.66	0	0	162	9	4/11	21.22	4	0	
8	Joy Perera	2019	2022	18	367	67	28.23	1	0	–	–	–	–	6	0	
9	Rakibul Hasan	2019	2019	8	14	5*	4.66	0	0	138	8	2/20	18.37	0	0	
10	Rehman Abdul	2019	2019	7	102	37*	51.00	0	0	–	–	–	–	6	0	
11	Michael Ross	2019	2019	8	56	34	14.00	0	0	114	7	4/15	17.14	3	0	
12	Anam Mollik	2019	2019	2	9	9	9.00	0	0	–	–	–	–	0	0	
13	Jaspreet Singh	2019	2026	29	80	21	8.88	0	0	416	24	4/9	21.08	8	0	
14	Charanjeet Singh	2019	2019	3	8	8*	–	0	0	30	1	1/18	35.00	0	0	
15	Simranjit Singh	2019	2019	1	8	8	8.00	0	0	–	–	–	–	0	0	
16	Gareth Berg ‡	2021	2024	19	153	39*	19.12	0	0	318	20	4/14	16.45	6	0	
17	Jade Dernbach (Note: Jade Dernbach also played 34 Twenty20 International matches for England. Only his record for Italy is given above.)	2021	2021	6	7	5	7.00	0	0	124	5	1/17	30.00	2	0	
18	Madupa Fernando	2021	2021	6	24	14	8.00	0	0	144	9	2/15	13.44	0	0	
19	Jamie Grassi	2021	2021	6	58	20	14.50	0	0	–	–	–	–	2	0	
20	Nikolai Smith	2021	2021	6	90	26	22.50	0	0	–	–	–	–	3	0	
21	Grant Stewart	2021	2026	24	532	76	28.00	3	0	430	20	3/21	24.95	7	0	
22	Damith Kosala	2021	2024	9	2	2*	2.00	0	0	156	12	3/16	14.00	2	0	
23	Amir Sharif	2021	2021	3	28	22*	14.00	0	0	–	–	–	–	3	0	
24	Ali Hasan	2022	2026	11	10	10*	3.33	0	0	222	13	3/9	17.61	2	0	
25	Bashar Khan	2022	2022	5	–	–	–	–	–	99	4	2/18	18.00	1	0	
26	Marcus Campopiano ‡	2022	2026	27	477	87*	29.81	3	0	42	2	1/12	20.00	10	0	
27	Crishan Kalugamage	2022	2026	22	30	7	10.00	0	0	431	27	4/17	17.74	8	0	
28	Harry Manenti	2022	2026	25	412	65	20.60	2	0	429	34	5/31	13.73	18	0	
29	Anthony Mosca	2022	2026	23	573	78	38.20	4	0	–	–	–	–	13	0	
30	Justin Mosca	2022	2026	24	486	72	23.14	4	0	–	–	–	–	9	0	
31	Anik Ahmed	2022	2022	4	53	26*	26.50	0	0	54	2	2/31	38.00	0	0	
32	Anmoldeep Singh	2022	2022	4	2	2	2.00	0	0	32	0	–	–	1	0	
33	Gurpreet Singh	2022	2022	3	17	15	8.50	0	0	24	0	–	–	1	0	
34	Pathirage Sadev †	2022	2022	4	1	1	1.00	0	0	–	–	–	–	2	0	
35	Dinuka Samarawickrama	2022	2022	3	15	13	5.00	0	0	–	–	–	–	0	0	
36	Achintha Denuwan	2022	2022	3	–	–	–	–	–	38	1	1/17	50.00	0	0	
37	Pidusha Fernando	2022	2022	2	0	0	0.00	0	0	6	0	–	–	0	0	
38	Waleed Rana	2022	2022	3	37	25	12.33	0	0	40	3	3/10	19.00	0	0	
39	Stefano di Bartolomeo	2023	2024	7	2	2*	–	0	0	147	13	5/14	9.84	6	0	
40	Ben Manenti	2023	2026	12	231	60	23.31	2	0	264	8	2/9	41.62	8	0	
41	Syed Naqvi	2023	2026	5	13	6	2.60	0	0	–	–	–	–	2	0	
42	Wayne Madsen ‡	2023	2026	7	205	61*	34.16	2	0	–	–	–	–	5	0	
43	Joe Burns ‡	2024	2025	8	271	108*	45.16	1	1	–	–	–	–	7	0	
44	Thomas Draca	2024	2026	11	11	5	5.50	0	0	210	13	3/9	19.53	2	0	
45	Zain Ali	2024	2025	3	0	0	0.00	0	0	48	4	3/16	10.75	1	0	
46	Emilio Gay	2025	2025	3	64	50	21.33	1	0	–	–	–	–	0	0	
47	JJ Smuts (Note: JJ Smuts also played 13 Twenty20 International matches for South Africa. Only his record for Italy is given above.)	2026	2026	7	83	24	13.83	0	0	153	6	2/18	28.16	3	0	
