= Italy national cricket team =

Men's national cricket team

Italy
- Nickname: Gli Azzurri (lit. 'The Blues')
- Association: Italian Cricket Federation

Personnel
- Captain: Harry Manenti
- Coach: John Davison

History
- Twenty20 debut: v Oman at Dubai; 13 March 2012

International Cricket Council
- ICC status: Affiliate (1984); Associate member (1995)
- ICC region: Europe
ICC Rankings	Current	Best-ever
T20I	23rd	22nd (16 June 2019)

International cricket
- First international: v Denmark at Bagsværd; 15 July 1989

One Day Internationals
- World Cup Qualifier appearances: 2 (first in 1997)
- Best result: First round (1997, 2001)

T20 Internationals
- First T20I: v Germany at Sportpark Maarschalkerweerd, Utrecht; 25 May 2019
- Last T20I: v West Indies at Eden Gardens, Kolkata; 19 February 2026
T20Is	Played	Won/Lost
Total	43	26/16 (0 ties, 1 no result)
This year	7	2/5 (0 ties, 0 no results)
- T20 World Cup appearances: 1 (first in 2026)
- Best result: Group stage (2026)
- T20 World Cup Qualifier appearances: 4 (Note: For the 2024 and 2026 Men's T20 World Cups, the final round of qualification in Europe was the ICC Europe Regional Final.) (first in 2012)
- Best result: 2nd place (2025)
T20I and List A kit
- As of 19 February 2026

The Italy men's national cricket team represents Italy in men's international cricket. They have been an associate member of the International Cricket Council since 1995, having previously been an affiliate member since 1984. The Italy national cricket team is administered by the Italian Cricket Federation.

== History ==
=== Early history ===
The earliest mention of cricket in Italy is of a match played by Admiral Nelson's sailors in 1793 during a stop in Naples harbour. Around the end of the 19th century, several combined cricket and association football clubs formed, including the world-famous A.C. Milan, which was originally the Milan Cricket and Football Club and the first Italian football team Genoa Cricket and Football Club, which was originally the Genoa Cricket & Athletic Club. But these clubs soon forgot about cricket and concentrated on football. Cricket started to be revived after the Second World War. Cricket flourished in Rome in the 1960s at a superb field which looked across to St. Peter's dome from Villa Doria Pamphili. The Australian and British embassies, the UN Food and Agriculture Organization, the Commonwealth War Graves Association, the Venerable English College and Beda College fielded teams which competed for the Rome Ashes there until, in the 1970s, the Villa became a public park.

When cricket resumed in Rome on other grounds at the end of the 1970s, four of the Villa Doria Pamphili-era players formed in 1980 the Doria Pamphili Cricket Club: the Italian-Sri Lankan Francis Alphonsus Jayarajah, the Italian-Indian Massimo da Costa, the Australian Desmond O'Grady and the Syrian Issam Kahale.

In the same period, some cricket was played in the northern part of Italy with the Milan Cricket Club being formed in the 1970s and Euratom CC in the 1980s.

=== Modern history ===
The "Federazione Cricket Italiana" (Italian Cricket Federation) was formed in 1980, and they became an affiliate member of the ICC in 1984, and were promoted to associate member in 1995.

After years of matches against neighboring nations such as France and Germany, in 1996, Italy took part in the first European Championship in Denmark, finishing seventh after beating Israel in a play-off. They took part in the ICC Trophy for the first time in the 1997 tournament and performed poorly, finishing joint last out of the 22 participants. They finished fifth in the following year's European Championship in which they caused the biggest upset to date in the history of the game by beating the England XI in the promotion/relegation playoff.

In 1999, Italy took part in a quadrangular tournament in Gibraltar also featuring France and Israel. They won the tournament, beating the hosts in the final. They finished fifth in Division One of the European Championship the following year and were due to participate in the 2001 ICC Trophy, but pulled out at the last minute due to a dispute over the eligibility of four players, Italian citizens by birth but not resident in Italy. The dispute was happily resolved by ICC a year later with the recognition of citizenship as a criterion for eligibility in national teams.

The 2002 European Championship saw Italy finish sixth in Division One, relegating them for 2004 to Division Two, which they promptly won. This qualified them for the repêchage tournament for the 2005 ICC Trophy in early 2005 in Kuala Lumpur, Malaysia. They finished seventh in that tournament after beating Zambia in a play-off.

They took part in Division One of the European Championship in 2006, finishing fifth.

In May–June 2007, they travelled to Darwin, Australia, to take part in Division Three of the World Cricket League. They finished seventh after beating Fiji in a play-off, and played in Division Four of the World Cricket League in 2008 to come third and remained in 2010 ICC World Cricket League Division Four. With a second-place finish there, they were promoted to 2011 ICC World Cricket League Division Three, where they came 4th to remain in 2013 ICC World Cricket League Division Three. They had a chance of reaching the 2015 Cricket World Cup, if they finished in the top two in the 2013 ICC World Cricket League Division Three, and then in the top two of the 2013 Cricket World Cup Qualifier. An encouraging start to this tournament witnessed wins over Oman (9 wickets) and United States (8 runs), followed by defeats, narrowly to Ireland (2 wickets) and more comprehensively against Kenya (7 wickets). After finishing last in this tournament they were relegated to Division Four in 2014.

In November 2013 they competed in the 2013 ICC World Twenty20 Qualifier in the UAE, their highest level of competition to date. They finished 9th place with victories over the US, and higher-ranked opponents in UAE and Namibia.

=== 2018–present: T20I status ===
In April 2018, the ICC decided to grant full Twenty20 International (T20I) status to all its members. Therefore, all Twenty20 matches played between Italy and other ICC members since 1 January 2019 have the T20I status.

In September 2018, Italy qualified from Group B of the 2018–19 ICC World Twenty20 Europe Qualifier to the Regional Finals of the tournament.

Italy played their first T20I against Germany in May 2019.

25 May 2019
11:00
Scorecard

Germany; 53 (16 overs)	v	Italy; 57/3 (8.4 overs)
Ahmed Wardak 20* (27); Michael Ross 4/15 (4 overs)		Joy Perera 21 (10); Izatullah Dawlatzai 2/17 (4 overs)

Italy won by 7 wickets
Sportpark Maarschalkerweerd, Utrecht
Umpires: Rizwan Akram (Ned) and Huub Jansen (Ned)

- Germany won the toss and elected to bat.
- First ever T20I match for Italy.

On July 11, 2025, following a stunning 12-run upset over Scotland at the European Regional Final,

9 July 2025
11:00
Scorecard

Italy; 167/6 (20 overs)	v	Scotland; 155/5 (20 overs)
Emilio Gay 50 (21); Michael Leask 3/18 (3 overs)		George Munsey 72 (61); Harry Manenti 5/31 (4 overs)

Italy won by 12 runs
Sportpark Westvliet, Voorburg
Umpires: Roland Black (Ire) and Russell Warren (Eng)
Player of the match: Harry Manenti (Ita)

- Italy won the toss and elected to bat.

Italy sealed a spot at the 2026 Men's T20 World Cup after finishing at second-place beating Jersey on net run rate.

The Irish cricket team toured UAE in January 2026 for a three match T20I series against Italy. In the 3rd T20I, Italy shocked Ireland in what would be their first win against a full member side in men's T20I cricket.

26 January 2026
18:00 (N)
Scorecard

Ireland; 154 (19.4 overs)	v	Italy; 157/6 (19.3 overs)
Paul Stirling 45 (38); Crishan Kalugamage 3/28 (4 overs)		Wayne Madsen 39 (30); Mark Adair 2/23 (4 overs); Matthew Humphreys 2/23 (4 overs)

Italy won by 4 wickets
The Sevens Stadium, Dubai
Umpires: Aasif Iqbal (UAE) and Shiju Sam (UAE)

- Italy won the toss and elected to field.

12 February 2026
15:00 UTC+5:30 (D/N)
Scorecard

Nepal; 123 (19.3 overs)	v	Italy; 124/0 (12.4 overs)
Aarif Sheikh 27 (24); Crishan Kalugamage 3/18 (4 overs)		Anthony Mosca 62* (32)

Italy won 10 wickets
Wankhede Stadium, Mumbai
Umpires: Donovan Koch (Aus) and Sam Nogajski (Aus)
Player of the match: Crishan Kalugamage (Ita)

- Italy won the toss and elected to field.
- This was the first time Italy and Nepal faced each other in T20Is.
- This was the first World Cup match victory for Italy across all formats.

== Squad composition and citizenship controversies ==
Italy has historically featured a large number of dual nationals in its squads at ICC tournaments, particularly Australian, English and South African players of Italian descent, who have never resided in Italy and do not play in Italian domestic cricket. The team withdrew from the 2001 ICC Trophy after the ICC ruled that citizenship by descent would not be sufficient for player eligibility, thereby disqualifying four members of the Italian squad including former Australian domestic player Joe Scuderi.

In 2023, it was reported that Italy had pursued a strategy of recruiting professional cricketers from Australia and England to play in the regional final of the 2022–23 ICC Men's T20 World Cup Europe Qualifier, including South African Wayne Madsen and Australians Ben Manenti, Harry Manenti and Spencer Johnson. The recruits, while holding Italian passports and meeting ICC regulations for representing the country, had only tenuous direct connections with Italy.

Italy's squad for its inaugural appearance at the 2026 Men's T20 World Cup included no Italian-born players. Only five out of the fifteen players named in the World Cup squad were Italian residents, all of whom had immigrated from South Asian countries as teenagers or young adults. JJ Smuts, a South African franchise player, was named in Italy's squad after acquiring Italian citizenship via his wife, whose great-grandfather was born in Italy.

== Tournament records ==
Legend

- Champions
- Runners-up
- Third place/Semi-finals
- Tournament hosted by Italy
- Q Qualified/Advanced to next stage
- DNQ Did not qualify
- ▲ Promoted
- Remained in the same division
- ▼ Relegated

=== Cricket World Cup ===
Cricket World Cup record								Qualification record				
Year	Round	Position	Pld	W	L	T	NR	Pld	W	L	T	NR
(England) 1975	Not an ICC member							Not an ICC member				
(England) 1979	Not an ICC member							Not an ICC member				
(England) (Wales) 1983	Not an ICC member							Not an ICC member				
(India) (Pakistan) 1987	Not eligible; ICC affiliate member							Not eligible; ICC affiliate member				
(Australia) (New Zealand) 1992	Not eligible; ICC affiliate member							Not eligible; ICC affiliate member				
(India) (Pakistan) (Sri Lanka) 1996	Did not qualify							Did not enter				
(England) (Wales) (Scotland) (Republic of Ireland) (Netherlands) 1999	Did not qualify							5	0	4	0	1
(South Africa) (Zimbabwe) (Kenya) 2003	Did not qualify							Withdrew				
(Cricket West Indies) 2007	Did not qualify							8	5	3	0	0
(India) (Sri Lanka) (Bangladesh) 2011	Did not qualify							11	7	4	0	0
(Australia) (New Zealand) 2015	Did not qualify							18	7	11	0	0
(England) (Wales) 2019	Did not qualify							12	3	9	0	0
(India) 2023	Did not qualify							15	5	9	0	1
(South Africa) (Zimbabwe) (Namibia) 2027	To be determined							15*	12	1	0	2
Total	—N/a	0/13	–	–	–	–	–	84	39	41	0	4

=== Cricket World Cup Qualifier ===
Cricket World Cup Qualifier record
Year	Round	Position	Pld	W	L	T	NR	Qual.
(England) 1979	Not an ICC member							
(England) 1982	Not an ICC member							
(England) 1986	Not an ICC member							
(Netherlands) 1990	Not eligible; ICC affiliate member							
(Kenya) 1994	Not eligible; ICC affiliate member							
(Malaysia) 1997	Group stage	21/21	4	0	4	0	0	DNQ
(Namibia) 2001	Qualified; withdrew							
(Ireland) 2005 – (Zimbabwe) 2023	Did not qualify							
Total	0 Titles	1/12	4	0	4	0	0	—N/a

=== CWC Challenge League ===
Cricket World Cup Challenge League record
Year	League	Round	Position	Pld	W	L	T	NR	P/R
2019–2022	B	League stage	4/6	15	5	9	0	1	▼
2024–2026	B	Winners	1/6	15	12	1	0	1	Same position
Total		1 Title	2/2	30	17	10	0	2	—N/a

=== Men's T20 World Cup ===
Men's T20 World Cup record								Qualification record				
Year	Round	Position	Pld	W	L	T	NR	Pld	W	L	T	NR
(South Africa) 2007	Not eligible							Not eligible				
(England) 2009	Not eligible							Not eligible				
(Cricket West Indies) 2010	Not eligible							Not eligible				
(Sri Lanka) 2012	Did not qualify							16	8	8	0	0
(Bangladesh) 2014	Did not qualify							16	10	5	0	1
(India) 2016	Did not qualify							5	3	2	0	0
(United Arab Emirates) (Oman) 2021	Did not qualify							10	8	2	0	0
(Australia) 2022	Did not qualify							6	3	3	0	0
(United States) (Cricket West Indies) 2024	Did not qualify							11	8	2	0	1
(India) (Sri Lanka) 2026	Group stage	14/20	4	1	3	0	0	9	7	1	0	1
(Australia) (New Zealand) 2028	To be determined							To be determined				
Total	0 Titles	1/10	4	1	3	0	0	73	47	23	0	3

=== T20 World Cup Global Qualifier ===
Men's T20 World Cup Global Qualifier record
Year	Round	Position	Pld	W	L	T	NR	Qual.
(Ireland) 2008	Not eligible							
(United Arab Emirates) 2010	Not eligible							
(United Arab Emirates) 2012	Play-offs	10/16	9	3	6	0	0	DNQ
(United Arab Emirates) 2013	Play-offs	9/16	9	3	5	0	1	DNQ
(Ireland) (Scotland) 2015	Did not qualify							
(United Arab Emirates) 2019	Did not qualify							
(Oman) 2022	Did not qualify							
(To be determined) 2028	Qualified							
Total	0 Titles	3/8	18	6	11	0	1	—N/a

=== T20 World Cup Europe Regional Final ===
T20 World Cup Europe Regional Final record
Year	Round	Position	Pld	W	L	T	NR	Qual.
(Guernsey) 2019	Round-robin	3/6	5	3	2	0	0	DNQ
(Spain) 2023	Round-robin	3/4	6	3	3	0	0	DNQ
(Scotland) 2023	Round-robin	3/7	6	3	2	0	1	DNQ
(Netherlands) 2025	Runners-up	2/6	4	2	1	0	1	Q
(To be determined) 2027	Qualified							
Total	0 Titles	5/5	21	11	8	0	2	—N/a

=== Other international tournaments ===
CWC Qualifier Play-off (ODI)	CWC Challenge League Play-off (List A)	World Cricket League (LA/ODI/50 overs)
2026: Qualified	2024: Runners-up (Q)	2007 (Division Three) : 7th place (▼); 2008 (Division Four) : 4th place; 2010 (Division Four) : Runners-up (▲); 2011 (Division Three) : 4th place; 2013 (Division Three) : 6th place (▼); 2014 (Division Four) : 4th place; 2016 (Division Four) : 6th place (▼); 2017 (Division Five) : 4th place

=== Other regional tournaments ===
T20WC Europe Sub-regional Qualifiers (T20I)	European Cricket Championship (LA/50 overs)	European T20 C'ship Division One (T20)
2018: Winners (Q); 2022: Winners (Q); 2024: Winners (Q); 2026: Received a bye	1996: 7th place; 1998: 5th place; 2000: 5th place; 2002: 6th place; 2006: 5th place; 2008: 5th place; 2010: 6th place	2011: Runners-up (Q); 2013: Winners (Q); 2015: 3rd place

== Current squad ==
Italy's squad for the 2026 Men's T20 World Cup in February 2026 included the following players:

Name	Age	Batting style	Bowling style	Notes
Batters
Anthony Mosca	35	Right-handed	Right-arm off break	
Justin Mosca	31	Left-handed	Right-arm medium	
Syed Naqvi	33	Right-handed	Right-arm medium	
Zain Ali	25	Right-handed	Right-arm off break	
All-rounders
Wayne Madsen	42	Right-handed	Right-arm off break	Captain
Grant Stewart	32	Right-handed	Right-arm fast-medium	
JJ Smuts	38	Right-handed	Left-arm orthodox spin	
Jaspreet Singh	33	Right-handed	Right-arm fast-medium	
Benjamin Manenti	29	Right-handed	Right-arm off break	
Harry Manenti	26	Right-handed	Right-arm off break	
Wicket-keepers
Marcus Campopiano	33	Right-handed	Right-arm offbreak	
Gian-Piero Meade	29	Right-handed	Right-arm medium	
Spin Bowlers
Crishan Kalugamage	35	Right-handed	Right-arm leg spin	
Pace Bowlers
Thomas Draca	28	Right-handed	Right-arm fast	
Ali Hasan	24	Right-handed	Left-arm medium-fast	

== Coaching staff ==
Role	Name
Head coach	John Davison
Assistant Coach	Dougie Brown
Assistant Coach	Kevin O’Brien
Team Manager	Peter DiVenuto
Physiotherapist	Thihan Chandramohan
Strength & Conditioning Coach	Marco Mastrorocco
Analyst	Mohsin Sheikh

== International grounds ==
Locations of all stadiums which have hosted an international cricket match within Italy

Ground	City	Region	Capacity	Matches hosted	Notes
Roma Cricket Ground	Rome	Lazio	1,000	T20Is, ICC qualifiers	Main venue for Italy's national team; hosted ICC Men's T20 World Cup Europe Qualifiers
Jesselton Cricket Ground	Jesolo	Veneto	800	T20Is	Used for ICC Europe development tournaments
Simar Cricket Ground	Palermo	Sicily	1,200	T20Is	Hosts international matches; part of ICC Europe's southern development region

== Records and statistics ==
=== International Match Summary — Italy ===
Last updated 19 February 2026

Playing Record
Format	M	W	L	T	NR	Inaugural Match
Twenty20 Internationals	43	26	16	0	1	25 May 2019

=== Twenty20 International ===
- Highest team total: 244/4 v. Romania on 16 June 2024 at Simar Cricket Ground, Palermo.
- Highest individual score: 108*, Joe Burns v. Romania on 16 June 2024 at Simar Cricket Ground, Palermo.
- Best individual bowling figures: 5/14, Stefano di Bartolomeo v. Germany on 28 July 2023 at The Grange Club, Edinburgh.

Most T20I runs for Italy

Player	Runs	Average	Career span
Anthony Mosca	573	38.20	2022–2026
Grant Stewart	532	28.00	2021–2026
Justin Mosca	486	23.14	2022–2026
Marcus Campopiano	477	29.81	2022–2026
Harry Manenti	412	20.60	2022–2026

Most T20I wickets for Italy

Player	Wickets	Average	Career span
Harry Manenti	34	13.73	2022–2026
Crishan Kalugamage	27	17.74	2022–2026
Jaspreet Singh	24	21.08	2019–2026
Gareth Berg	20	16.45	2022–2024
Grant Stewart	20	24.95	2021–2026

T20I record versus other nations

Records complete to T20I #3724. Last updated 19 February 2026.

Opponent	M	W	L	T	NR	First match	First win
vs Full Members
England	1	0	1	0	0	16 February 2026	
Ireland	4	1	3	0	0	20 July 2023	26 January 2026
West Indies	1	0	1	0	0	19 February 2026	
vs Associate Members
Croatia	1	1	0	0	0	16 July 2022	16 July 2022
Denmark	5	3	1	0	1	18 June 2019	15 October 2021
Finland	1	1	0	0	0	13 July 2022	13 July 2022
France	1	1	0	0	0	10 June 2024	10 June 2024
Germany	8	5	3	0	0	25 May 2019	25 May 2019
Greece	1	1	0	0	0	12 July 2022	12 July 2022
Guernsey	2	2	0	0	0	16 June 2019	16 June 2019
Isle of Man	2	2	0	0	0	19 July 2022	19 July 2022
Jersey	4	1	3	0	0	19 June 2019	23 July 2023
Luxembourg	1	1	0	0	0	9 June 2024	9 June 2024
Nepal	1	1	0	0	0	12 February 2026	12 February 2026
Netherlands	1	0	1	0	0	11 July 2025	
Norway	1	1	0	0	0	15 June 2019	15 June 2019
Romania	1	1	0	0	0	16 June 2024	16 June 2024
Scotland	3	1	2	0	0	24 July 2023	9 July 2025
Spain	2	1	1	0	0	5 November 2022	6 November 2022
Sweden	1	1	0	0	0	15 July 2022	15 July 2022
Turkey	1	1	0	0	0	13 June 2024	13 June 2024

== See also ==
- List of Italy Twenty20 International cricketers
