= Gian-Piero Meade =

Italian cricketer (born 1996)

JP Meade
Personal information
- Full name: Gian-Piero Sergio Meade
- Born: 19 March 1996 (age 30); South Africa
- Batting: Right-handed
- Bowling: Right-arm medium fast
- Role: All-rounder / Wicket Keeper

International information
- National side: Italy
- T20I debut (cap 6): 25 May 2019 v Germany
- Last T20I: 9 February 2026 v Scotland

Career statistics
Competition	T20I	LA	T20
Matches	35	26	35
Runs scored	344	383	344
Batting average	17.20	19.15	17.20
100s/50s	0/1	0/0	0/1
Top score	59*	49	59*
Balls bowled	182	243	182
Wickets	9	6	9
Bowling average	20.77	37.16	20.77
5 wickets in innings	0	0	0
10 wickets in match	0	0	0
Best bowling	3/18	2/10	3/18
Catches/stumpings	16/2	18/0	16/2
- Source: Cricinfo, 26 January 2026

Gian-Piero Sergio "JP" Meade (born 19 March 1996) is a South African-born Italian cricketer. He has played for the Italy national cricket team since 2016.

== International career ==
Born in South Africa, Meade is of Italian descent through his mother and holds dual South African and Italian citizenship. He played for the Italy national cricket team in the 2016 ICC World Cricket League Division Four tournament in October 2016.

In May 2019, he was named in Italy's squad for their Twenty20 International (T20I) series against Germany in the Netherlands. He made his T20I debut for Italy against Germany on 25 May 2019. The same month, he was named in Italy's squad for the Regional Finals of the 2018–19 ICC T20 World Cup Europe Qualifier tournament in Guernsey.

In November 2019, he was named in Italy's squad for the Cricket World Cup Challenge League B tournament in Oman. He made his List A debut, for Italy against Kenya, on 3 December 2019. In September 2021, he was named in Italy's T20I squad for the Regional Final of the 2021 ICC Men's T20 World Cup Europe Qualifier tournament.

In January 2026, Meade was named in Italy's squad for the 2026 T20 World Cup, where he played in all four games in the group stage.

== Personal life ==
Meade was born in South Africa where he attended Christian Brothers College Boksburg, where he played first team cricket, going on to play at under-19 level for Easterns. He later moved to England where he studied sports therapy and rehabilitation at Teesside University, graduating in 2025.
