= Marcus Campopiano =

Italian-English cricketer

Personal information
- Born: 21 February 1995 (age 31); Middlesex, England
- Batting: Right-handed
- Bowling: Right-arm offbreak
- Role: Middle order Batter

International information
- National side: Italy (2022–present)
- T20I debut (cap 26): 12 July 2022 v Greece
- Last T20I: 16 February 2026 v England
- T20I shirt no.: 24

Career statistics
Competition	T20I	LA
Matches	27	19
Runs scored	477	737
Batting average	29.81	46.06
100s/50s	0/3	1/5
Top score	87*	101
Balls bowled	42	42
Wickets	2	0
Bowling average	20.00	–
5 wickets in innings	0	0
10 wickets in match	–	0
Best bowling	1/12	–
Catches/stumpings	10/–	12/–
- Source: Cricinfo, 20 February 2026

Marcus Campopiano (born 21 February 1995) is an Italian-English cricketer and coach who plays for the Italy national cricket team as a middle order batter and has previously been captain of the List A side. He is currently the assistant strength and conditioning coach of the Surrey Women cricket team.

== Early life ==
Campopiano was born on 21 February 1995 in Middlesex, England, to an Italian father who holds a British passport. He grew up playing both rugby and cricket.

It was through his grandparents that he qualified to play for Italy, who had moved to England from Caserta, Naples in the 1950s.

== Career ==
=== Domestic career ===
In 2021, Campopiano represented Surrey’s Second XI in a match against Northamptonshire County Cricket Club. During this period he met Gareth Berg, then captain of the Italian national side, who encouraged him to join the Italy national cricket team. He currently works as assistant strength and conditioning coach for the Surrey Women's cricket team and plays part-time in the Surrey Premier League.

=== International career ===
Campopiano made his international debut for Italy on 18 June 2022 against Hong Kong at Kampala during the of 2019–2022 Cricket World Cup Challenge League. He finished the tournament as the fourth highest run-scorer for the team scoring 192 runs in 5 matches. He scored his first List A century for Italy on 22 February 2024 against Bermuda at the 2024 Cricket World Cup Challenge League Play-off. In November 2025, he was named as the captain of the Italian List A side for the 2024–2026 Cricket World Cup Challenge League.

He made his Twenty20 International (T20I) debut on 12 July 2022 against Greece at Vantaa. In August 2025, he was part of the historic Italian side that qualified for the 2026 Men's T20 World Cup. Following this qualification, he was named in Italy's squad for the World Cup.
