= Harry Manenti =

Italian cricketer (born 2000)

Personal information
- Full name: Harry John Manenti
- Born: 5 October 2000 (age 26)
- Batting: Right-handed
- Bowling: Right arm medium fast
- Role: All rounder
- Relatives: John Manenti (father); Ben Manenti (brother)

International information
- National side: Italy
- T20I debut (cap 28): 12 July 2022 v Greece
- Last T20I: 19 February 2026 v West Indies

Domestic team information
- Years: Team
- 2024/25–: Adelaide Strikers (squad no. 25)
- 2025/26–: South Australia

Career statistics
Competition	T20I	LA	T20
Matches	25	16	44
Runs scored	412	526	670
Batting average	20.60	43.83	20.30
100s/50s	0/2	2/0	0/2
Top score	65	114*	65
Balls bowled	429	457	464
Wickets	34	16	37
Bowling average	13.73	25.68	13.75
5 wickets in innings	1	0	1
10 wickets in match	0	0	0
Best bowling	5/31	3/32	5/31
Catches/stumpings	18/–	13/–	24/–
- Source: CricInfo, 27 September 2026

Harry John Manenti (born 5 October 2000) is an Australian-born Italian cricketer who plays for Adelaide Strikers and the Italy national cricket team. He made his Big Bash League debut on 15 January 2025 against Sydney Sixers.

== Domestic career ==
Described as an all-rounder, Manenti hit consecutive sixes in the final of the Australian National Premier T20 cricket competition in 2020, to help his Sydney team beat Adelaide University. In March 2022 he completed his first season playing club cricket for New Town Cricket Club and was awarded the Emerson Rodwell Medal as the men's first grade player of the year.

In June 2023, he was selected as part of the South Australia cricket team pathway squad. He also joined the Adelaide-based West Torrens Cricket Club.

Manenti signed for Big Bash League side Adelaide Strikers in December 2024. He made his 2024-25 Big Bash League season debut on 15 January 2025 against Sydney Sixers. He was presented his cap pre-game by his brother Ben, who plays for the Sixers. The following season, 2025–26, Manenti made his debut for South Australia in the One-Day Cup.

== International career ==
Manenti made his debut for the Italy national cricket team in July 2022. The following month he hit his first century for Italy, scoring 106 against Hong Kong. In August 2025, he helped Italy qualify for the 2026 T20 World Cup.

In January 2026, Manenti was named in Italy's squad for the 2026 T20 World Cup, making his World Cup debut against Scotland on 9 February 2026.

== Personal life ==
His brother Ben Manenti is a professional cricketer, who also plays for the Italy national team. Their father John Manenti is a former rugby union player and now coach who won the 2014 premiership as coach of Eastwood Rugby Club and played 150 games at prop and hooker with Western Suburbs and Sydney University Football Club. In 2018, he became the coach of the Australia women's national rugby sevens team.
