= Ben Manenti =

Italian cricketer (born 1997)

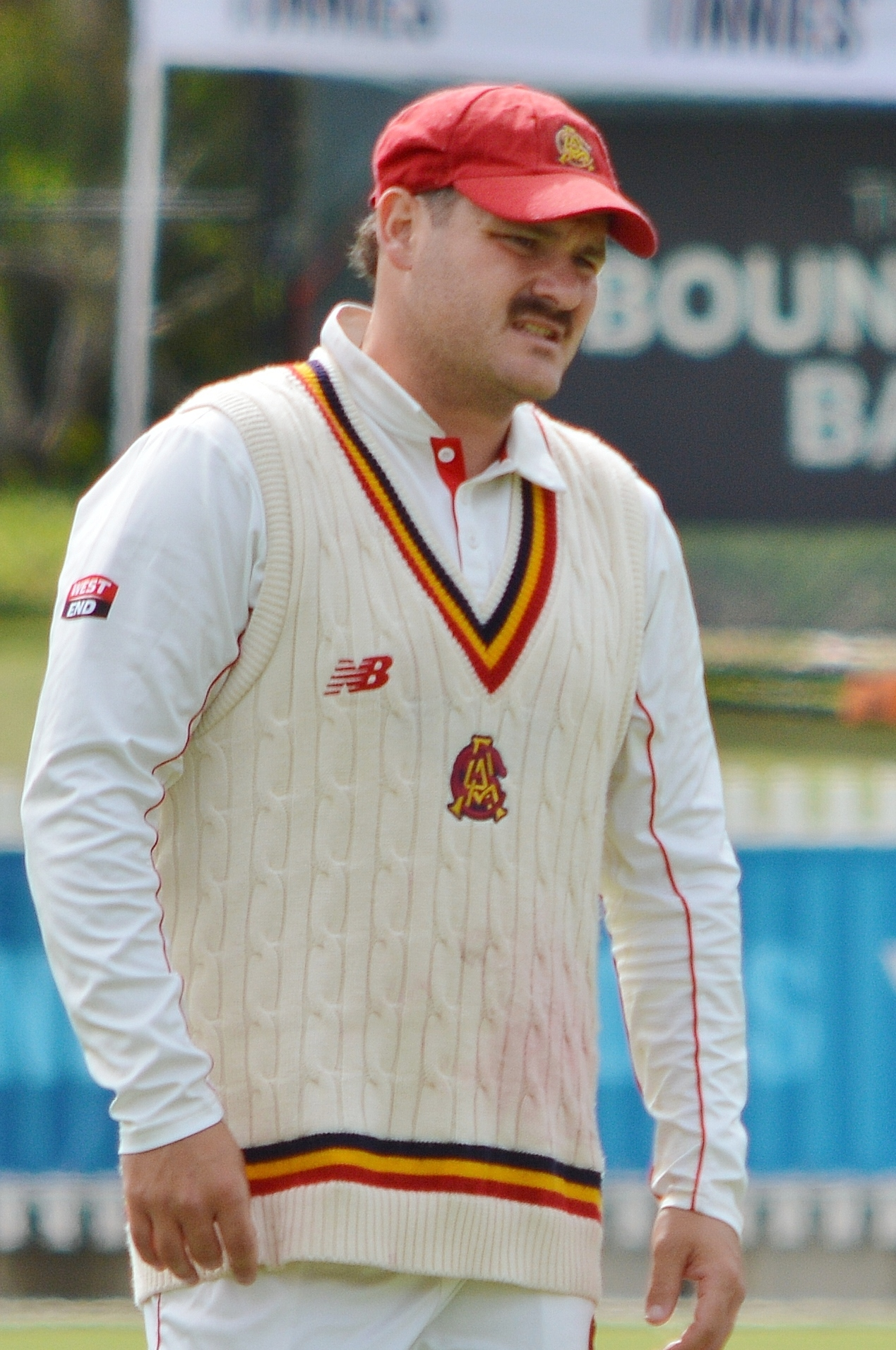
- Manenti playing First Class cricket with South Australia in March 2026

Personal information
- Full name: Benjamin Andrew Davey Manenti
- Born: 23 March 1997 (age 29); Sydney, New South Wales, Australia
- Batting: Right-handed
- Bowling: Right-arm off break
- Role: All-rounder
- Relatives: John Manenti (father); Harry Manenti (brother)

International information
- National side: Italy
- T20I debut (cap 40): 20 July 2023 v Ireland
- Last T20I: 16 February 2026 v England

Domestic team information
- Years: Team
- 2018/19–2020/21: Sydney Sixers (squad no. 46)
- 2021/22: Tasmania
- 2022/23–present: South Australia (squad no. 46)
- 2022/23–2023/24: Adelaide Strikers (squad no. 26)
- 2024/25–2025/26: Sydney Sixers (squad no. 46)
- 2026: Rotterdam Dockers
- 2026/27–present: Melbourne Renegades (squad no. 46)

Career statistics
Competition	T20I	FC	LA	T20
Matches	12	40	27	61
Runs scored	231	1,979	369	421
Batting average	23.10	35.98	20.50	15.59
100s/50s	0/2	1/12	0/3	0/2
Top score	60	128	61	60
Balls bowled	264	6,187	1,316	891
Wickets	8	71	30	31
Bowling average	41.62	44.28	38.10	35.87
5 wickets in innings	0	2	0	0
10 wickets in match	0	0	0	0
Best bowling	2/9	5/73	3/30	2/9
Catches/stumpings	8/–	52/–	13/–	17/–
- Source: Cricinfo, 23 October 2026

Benjamin Andrew Davey Manenti (born 23 March 1997) is an Italian-Australian cricketer. He is a right-arm off spin bowler who bats right-handed. He has played for Tasmania, South Australia, the Sydney Sixers, and the Adelaide Strikers. He has also represented the Italy national cricket team, qualifying as a citizen by descent.

== Domestic and franchise career ==
Manenti made his Twenty20 debut for the Sydney Sixers in the 2018–19 Big Bash League season on 29 December 2018. On debut he took two wickets for thirteen runs and was named the player of the match.

Manenti made his List A debut on 1 November 2021, for Tasmania in the 2021–22 Marsh One-Day Cup, taking two wickets for 43 runs and was 15 not out when he ran out of partners as his team was all out. He made his first-class debut on 15 March 2022, for Tasmania in the 2021–22 Sheffield Shield season. On 13 November 2022, he took his maiden five-wicket haul in first-class cricket against Western Australia.

== International career ==
Through his Italian grandmother, Manenti is eligible to represent Italy internationally. He committed to playing at the 2020–21 ICC Men's T20 World Cup Europe Qualifier in Spain in May 2020, but the event was postponed due to the COVID-19 pandemic. His younger brother Harry has also represented Italy.

Manenti made his Twenty20 International debut for Italy against Ireland at the 2023 ICC Men's T20 World Cup Europe Regional Final in Scotland.

In August 2025, Manenti helped Italy qualify for the 2026 T20 World Cup. After a few months, in January 2026, he was named in Italy's squad for the 2026 T20 World Cup.

== Personal life ==
Manenti's brother Harry is also an Italian international cricketer. Their father John Manenti is a former rugby union player and now coach who won the 2014 premiership as coach of Eastwood Rugby Club and played 150 games at prop and hooker with Western Suburbs and Sydney University Football Club. In 2018, he became the coach of the Australia women's national rugby sevens team.
