= Leidschendam-Voorburg =

- Municipality
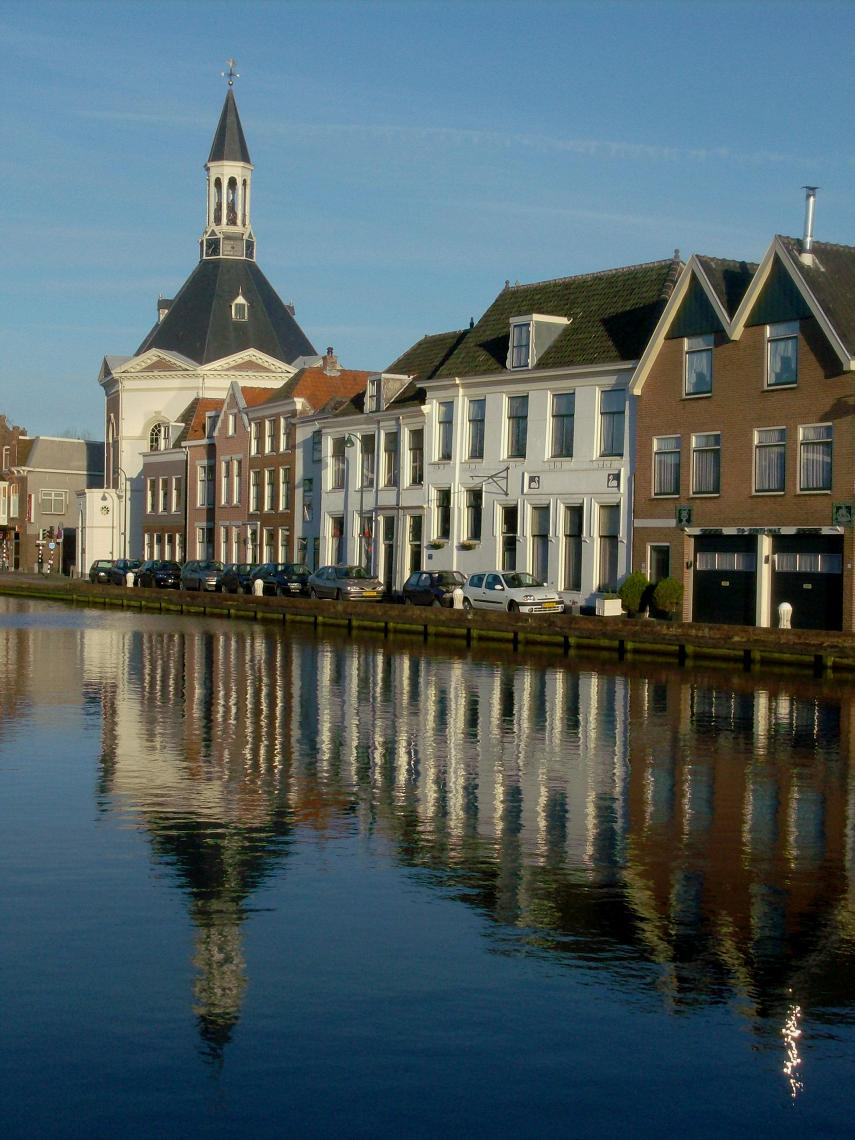
- The Vliet through Leidschendam

- Flag Coat of arms

- Location in South Holland

- Location in the Netherlands
- Coordinates: 52°5′N 4°24′E
- Country: Netherlands
- Province: South Holland
- Established: 1 January 2002

Government
  - Body: Municipal council
  - Mayor: Martijn Vroom (CDA)

Area
  - Total: 35.62 km^{2} (13.75 sq mi)
  - Land: 32.55 km^{2} (12.57 sq mi)
  - Water: 3.07 km^{2} (1.19 sq mi)
- Elevation: 0 m (0 ft)

Population (January 2021)
  - Total: 76,433
  - Density: 2,348/km^{2} (6,080/sq mi)
- Time zone: UTC+1 (CET)
  - Summer (DST): UTC+2 (CEST)
- Postcode: 2260–2275
- Area code: 070, 071
- Website: www.lv.nl

Leidschendam-Voorburg (Dutch pronunciation: [ˌlɛitsə(n)dɑɱˈvoːrbʏr(ə)x]) is a municipality in the Western Netherlands, in the province of South Holland, just northeast of The Hague. It had a population of 76,433 in 2021, and covers an area of 35.62 km^{2} (13.75 sq mi) of which 3.07 km^{2} (1.19 sq mi) is water.

== Origin ==
The municipality of Leidschendam-Voorburg is the result of merging the municipalities Leidschendam and Voorburg in 2002. It consists of the two towns Leidschendam and Voorburg, which grew towards each other in the first half of the 20th century. The village Stompwijk and a hamlet called Wilsveen also belong to the municipality.

Leidschendam-Voorburg abuts the city of The Hague and is often regarded as its suburb, even though it is an independent municipality. It is part of the Haaglanden conurbation. Stompwijk is still a rural village, located a few kilometres northeast of Leidschendam.

== Historic town centres ==
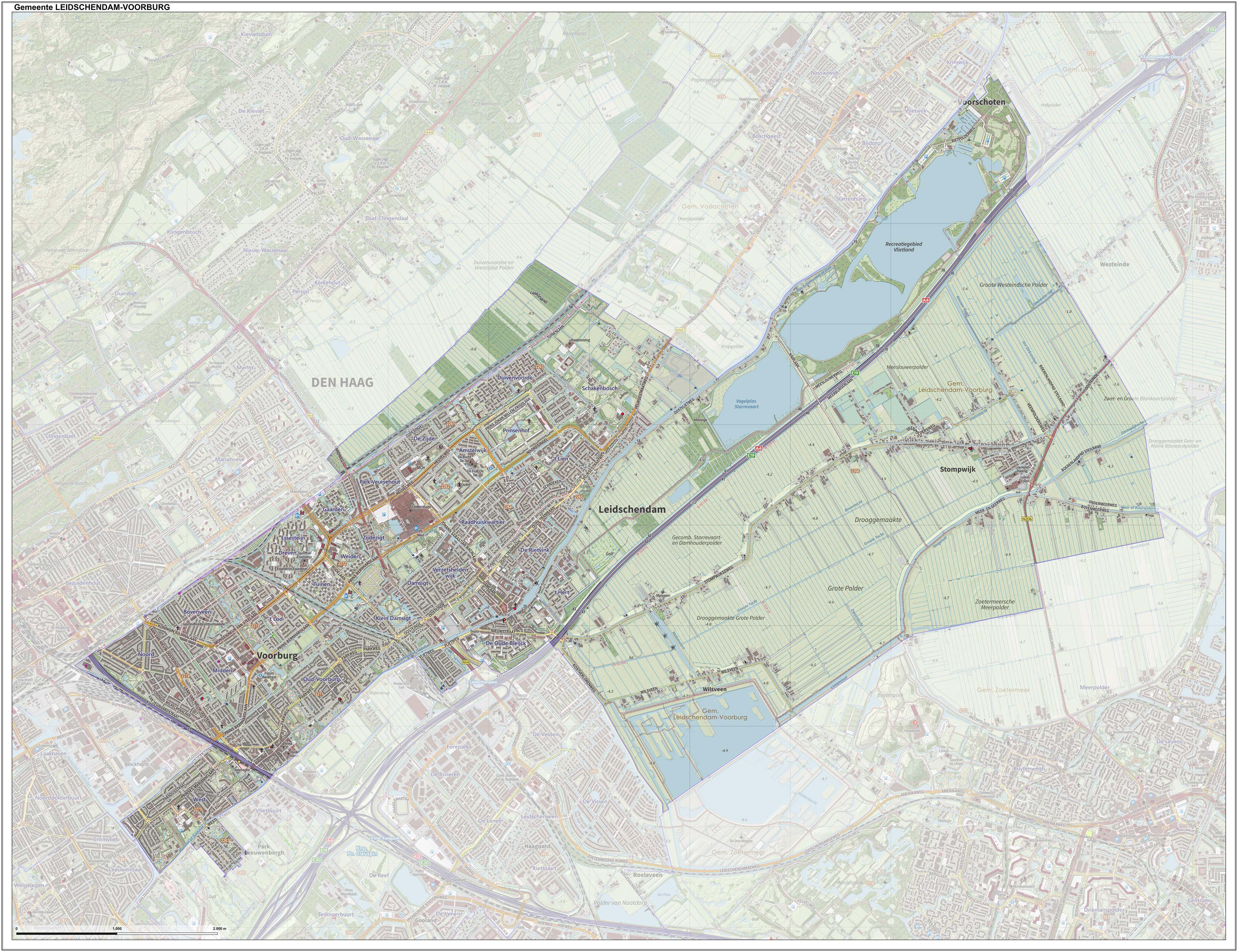
Map of Leidschendam-Voorburg, June 2015

Both Leidschendam and Voorburg have their own historic town centre, which are decentrally situated.
Historic Leidschendam lies around the ancient locks in the Vliet canal in the eastern part of the town.
About 3 kilometres to the south is the beginning of the Herenstraat, the main street of the Voorburg town centre. The canal also forms the eastern border of the town. The most important buildings like Swaensteyn House, the Old Church (Oude Kerk) and Hofwijck are in or very near the Herenstraat.

== Mall of the Netherlands ==
In 2021 the Leidsenhage shopping mall in Leidschendam re-opened after a makeover, with the new name of Westfield Mall of the Netherlands. The new shopping area was expanded to 117.000 square metres.

== Sister cities ==
Leidschendam-Voorburg is twinned with:

- Hranice, Czech Republic (since 1990),
- Konstancin-Jeziorna, Poland (since 1991)

The municipality was also twinned with Temecula in California, United States from 1993 to 2019.

== Transport ==
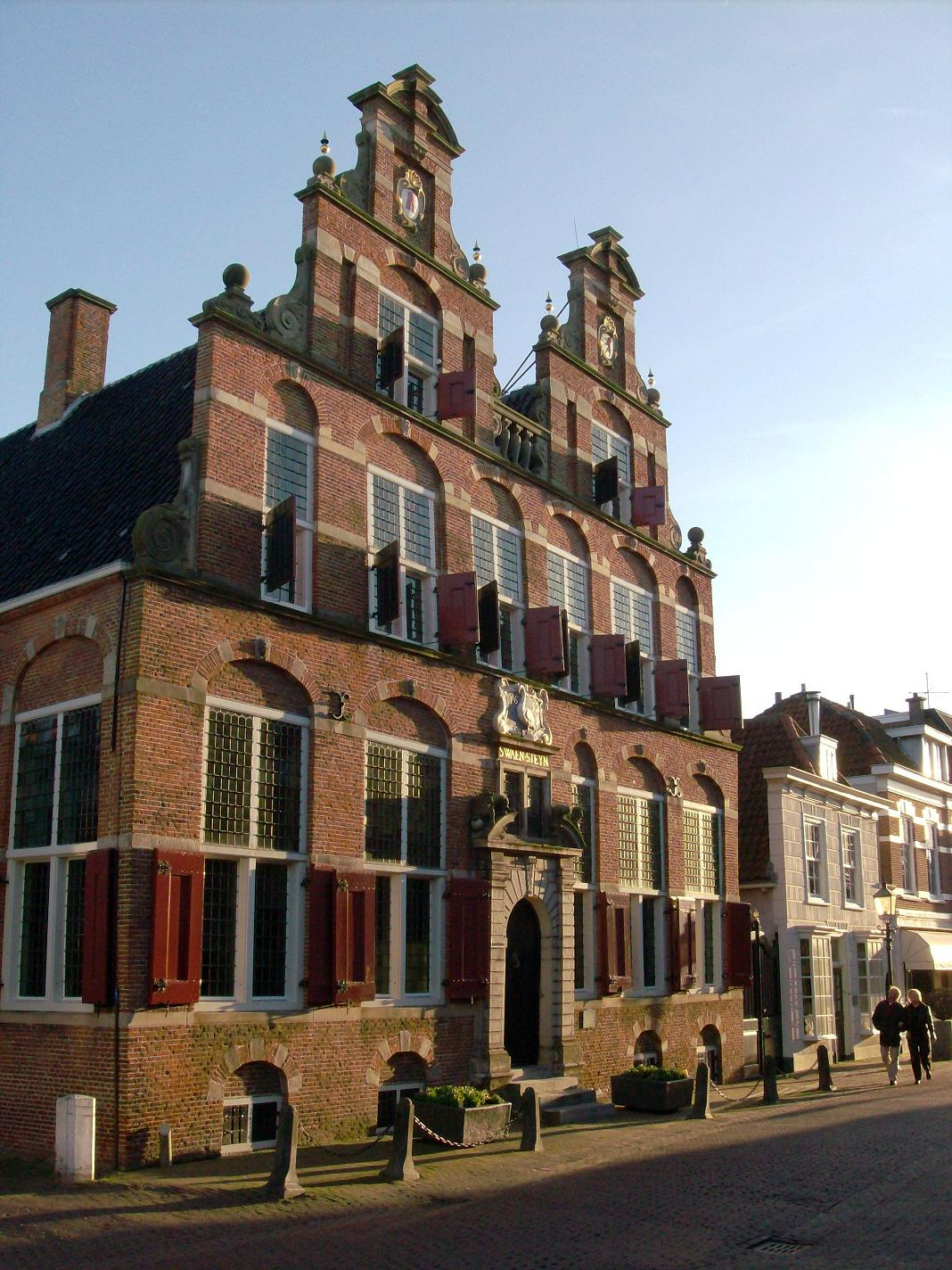
The old town hall (Swaensteyn) located on Herenstraat, Voorburg

=== Public transport ===
==== Railway ====
Three railway stations are located within the municipality, providing links with all major cities in the Randstad. The main train station is Voorburg station on The Hague-Utrecht railway line. This station is on the Southern edge of the town centre.
There are two stations on the Rotterdam-Amsterdam line, which are situated on the border of The Hague: Den Haag Laan van NOI (for some Intercity trains and local trains) and Den Haag Mariahoeve (only for local trains).

==== Light rail ====
Leidschendam-Voorburg has two stations on the RandstadRail lines. RandstadRail is the official name for a light rail project connecting the cities of The Hague, Rotterdam and Zoetermeer. These lines use former train routes, converted for use by light rail vehicles.
Despite its name, RandstadRail is only used for tram 3 and 4 to Zoetermeer. The line to Rotterdam is used as a branch of the Rotterdam metro: Rotterdam metro line E. Stations in Leidschendam-Voorburg (for both trams and metro) are Voorburg 't Loo and Leidschendam-Voorburg. RandstadRail also stops at Den Haag Laan van NOI train station.

==== Bus and tram ====
There are two major bus services running through this municipality: HTM and EBS. Several tram trajectories through Leidschendam-Voorburg – run by HTM – connecting various parts of the city with each other, as well as with neighbouring cities.

=== Roads ===
Leidschendam-Voorburg is connected to the A4 (Amsterdam to the Belgian border via Rotterdam) and A12 (The Hague to the German border via Utrecht) motorways, which cross each other near the city centre of Voorburg.

The N14 dual carriageway, which connects the A4 at Leidschendam to the N44 dual carriageway at Wassenaar runs through a series of tunnels in the municipality.

Together with a part of motorway A4 and several local roads the N14 forms the Ring Den Haag.

=== Cycle paths ===
Like every Dutch municipality, Leidschendam-Voorburg provides a wide range of facilities for cyclists. As an example, on the eastern edge, there are two large cycle bridges that cross different roads and ditches.

== Notable people ==
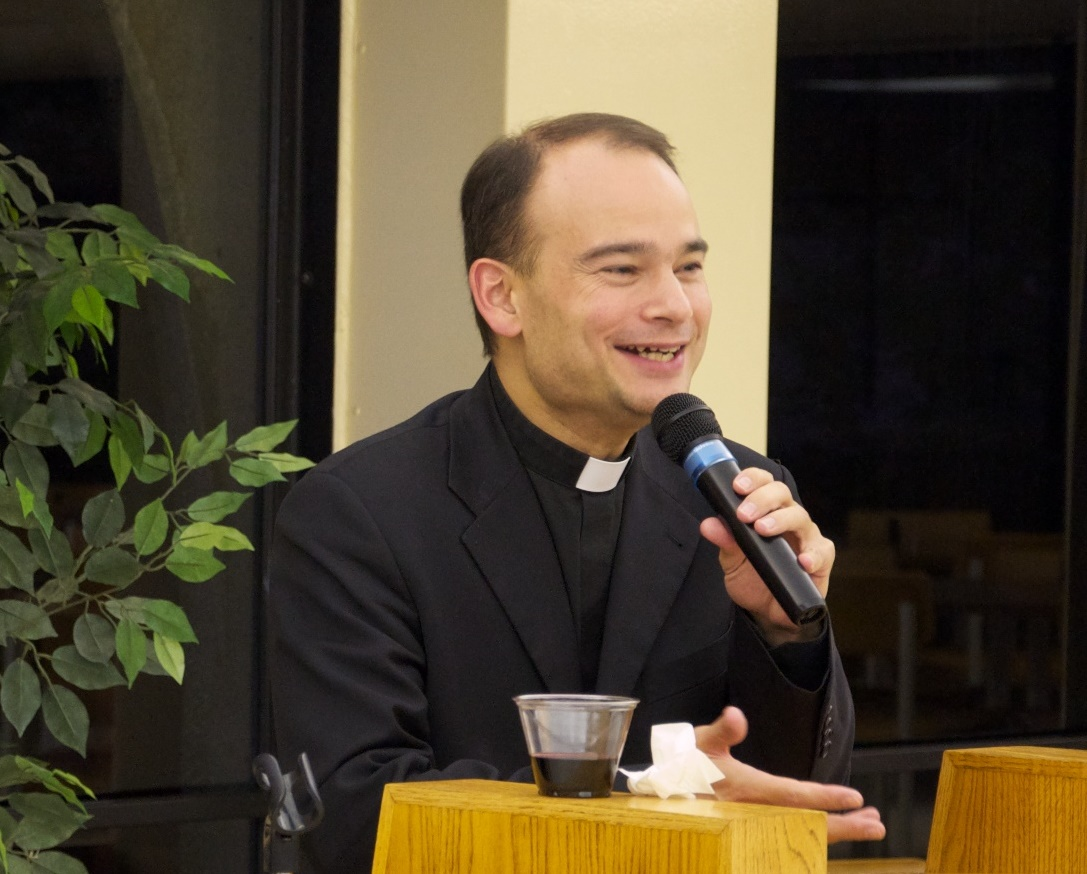
Roderick Vonhogen, 2011

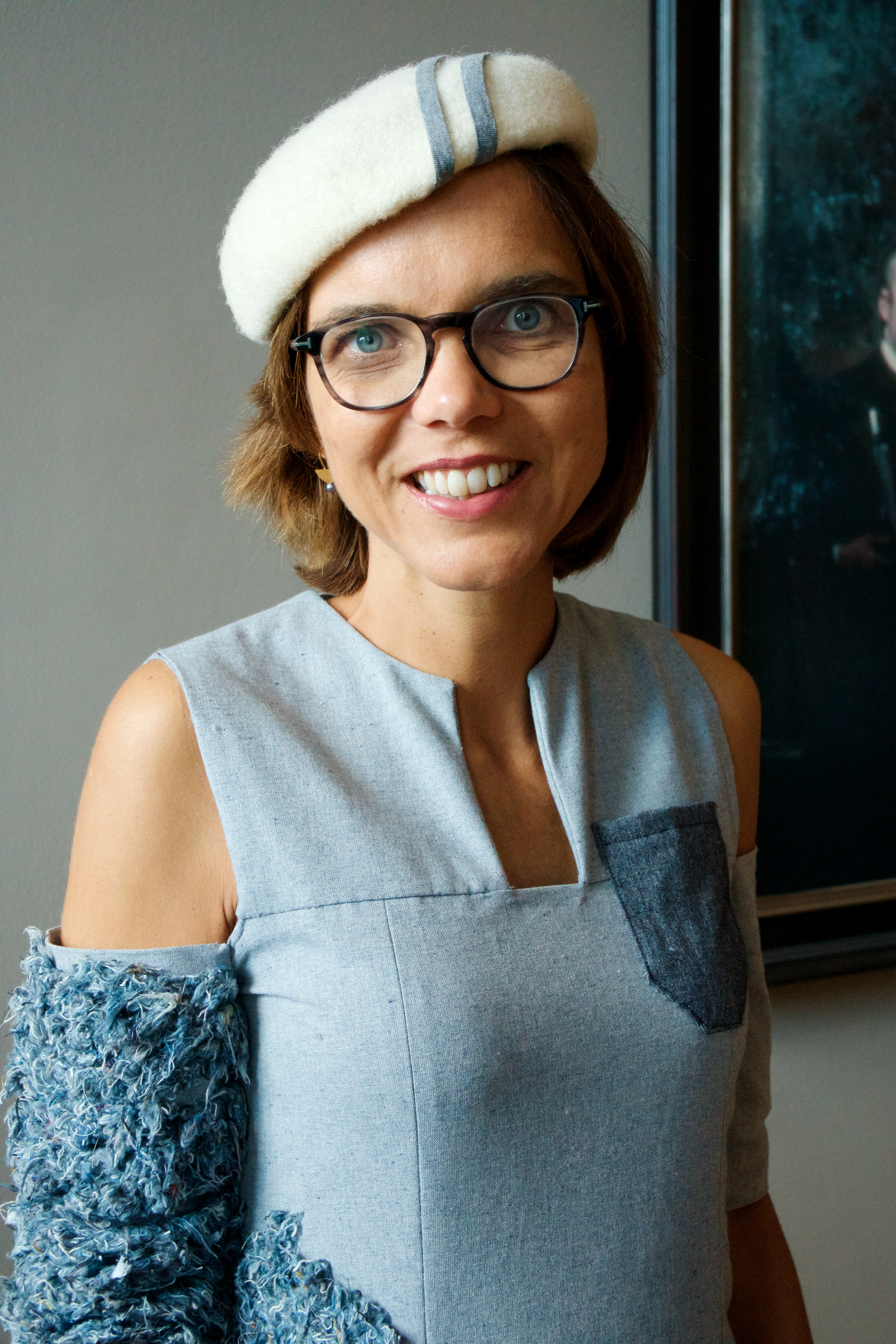
Carla Dik-Faber, 2018

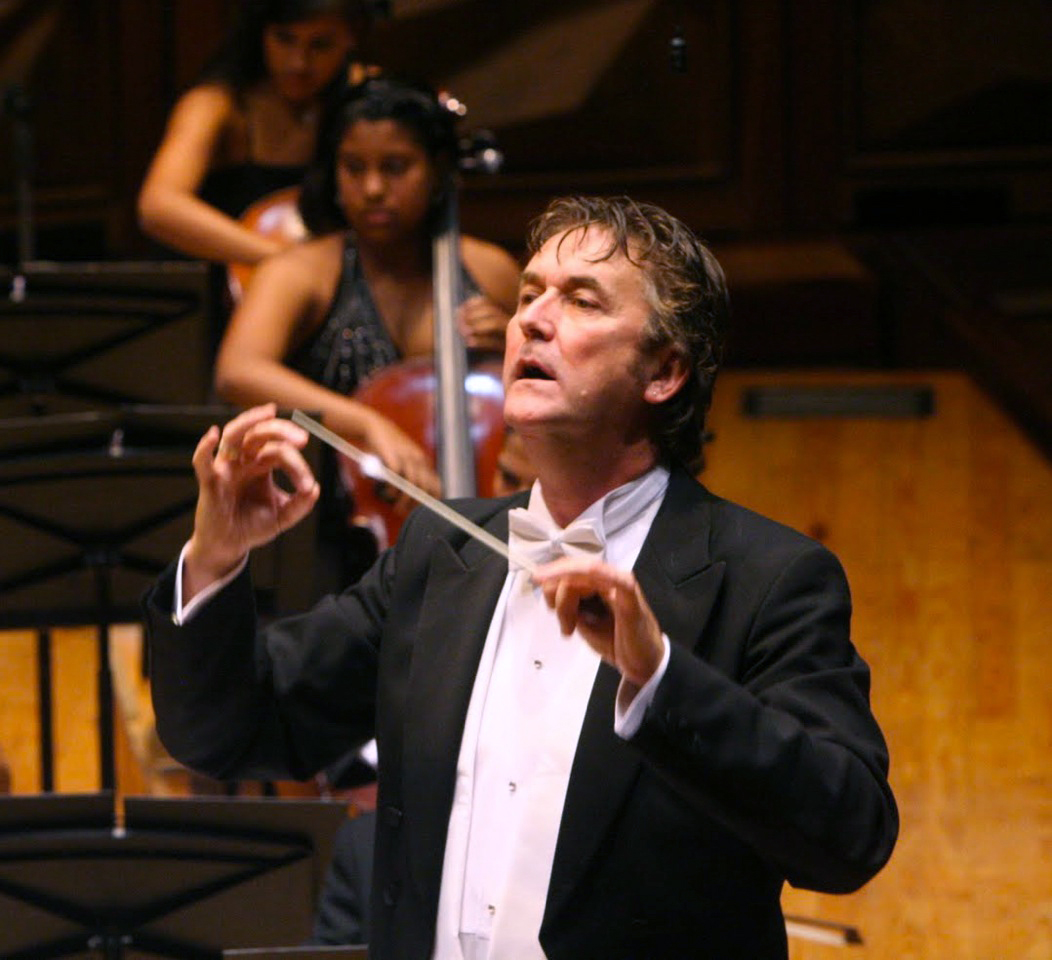
Johan De Meij, 2016

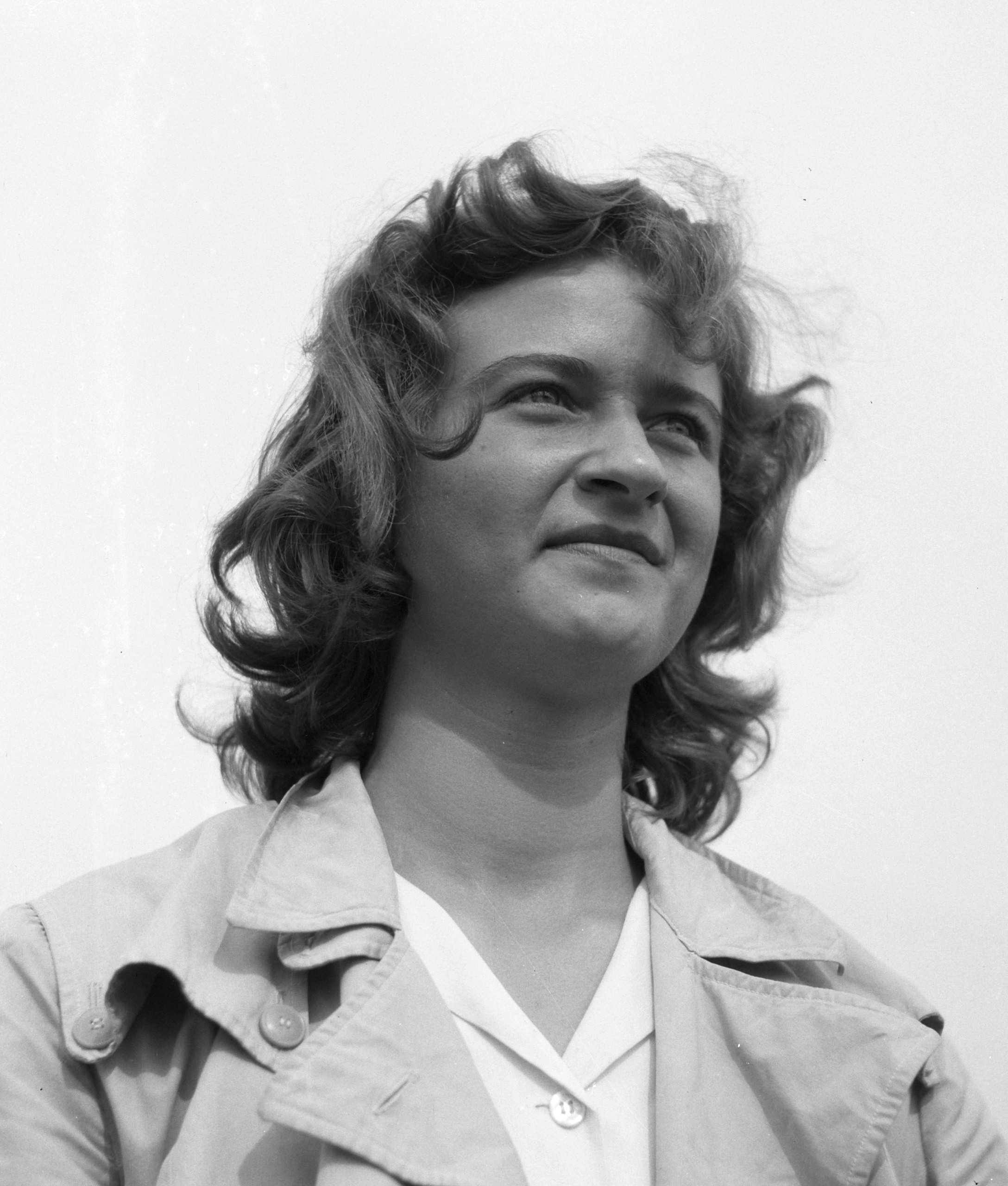
Bertha "Puck" Brouwer, 1950

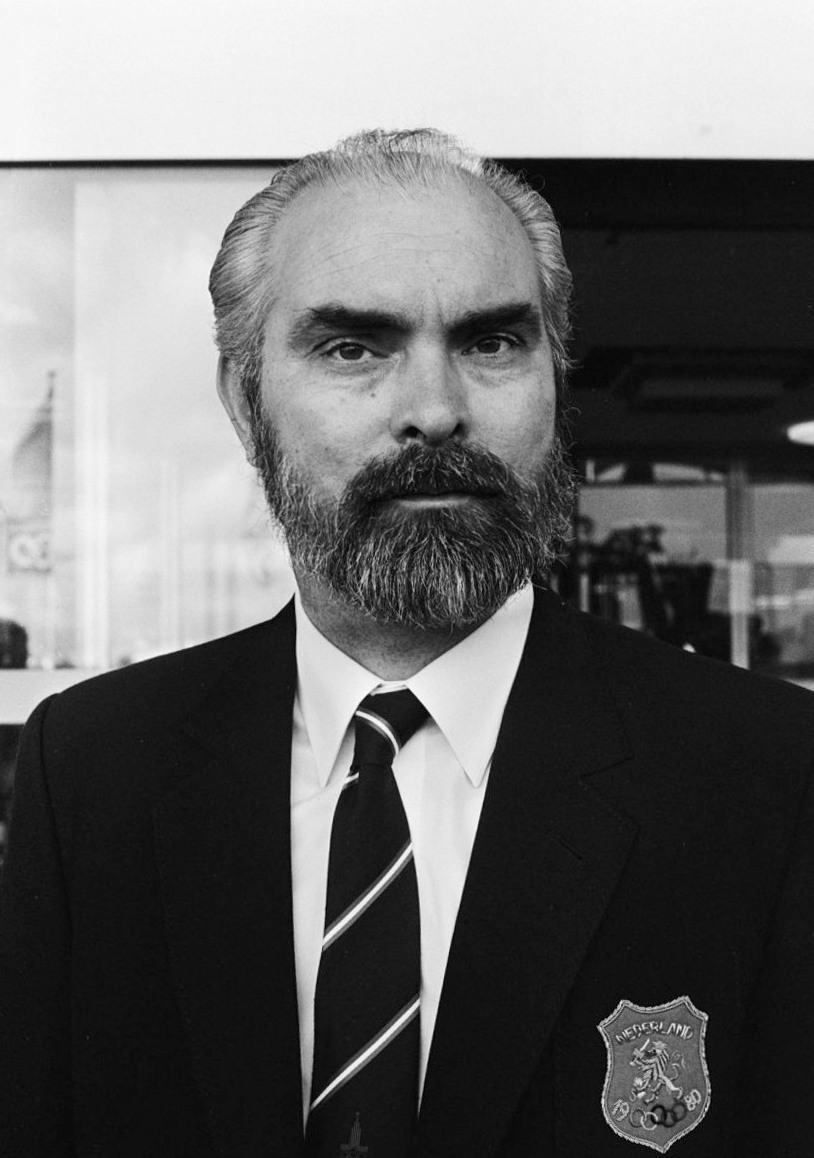
Christiaan van Velzen, 1980

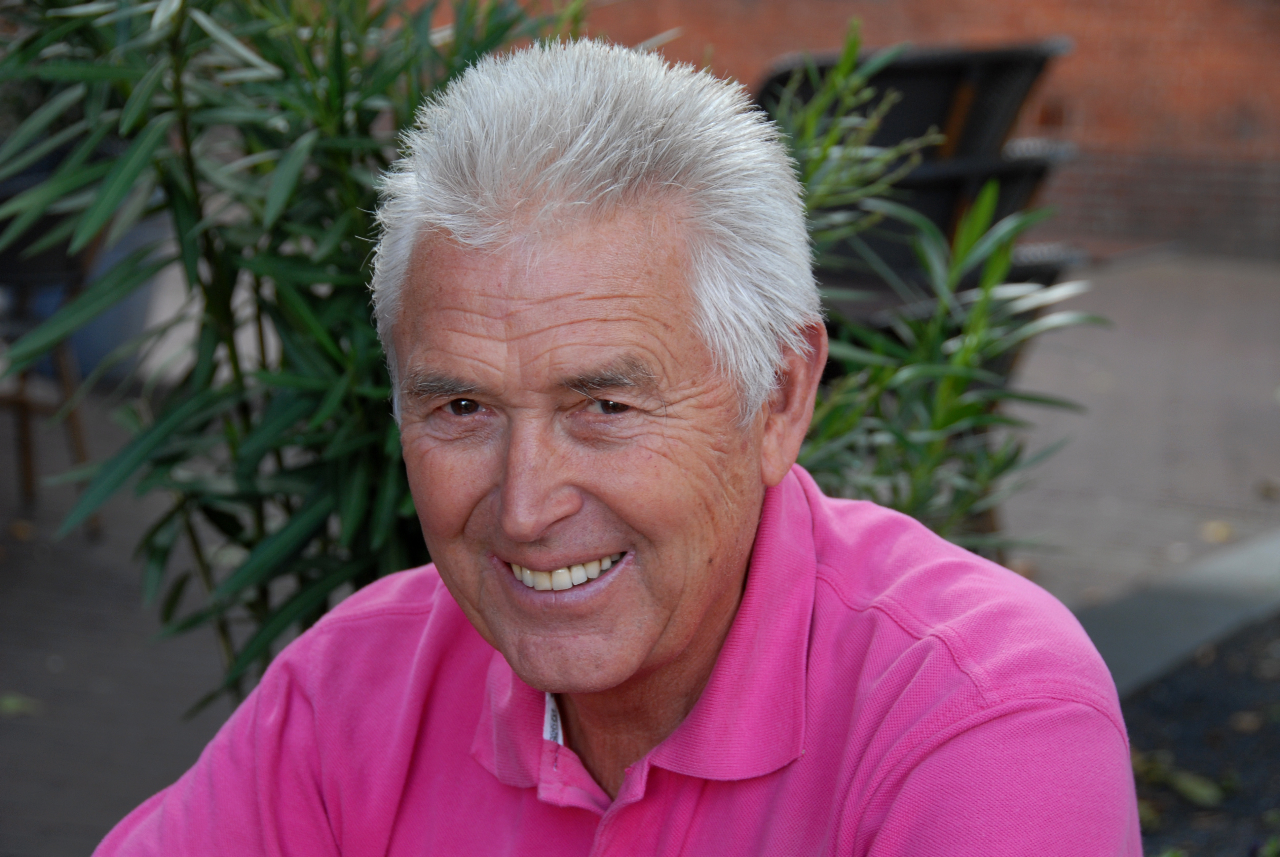
Gerben Karstens, 2011

=== Public thought and public service ===
- Jan van Valckenborgh (ca. 1575 in Voorburg − 1624) a military engineer who built fortresses
- Barbera van Meerten-Schilperoort (1778 in Geestbrug – 1853) a women's rights activist
- Guillaume Groen van Prinsterer (1801 in Voorburg – 1876) a politician and historian
- Jacobus Aarden (1914–1997) lived much of his life and died in Voorburg. A member of the municipal council of Voorburg for 20 years, member of House of Representatives
- Willem Scholten (1927 – 2005 in Leidschendam) a politician, held several ministerial offices
- Jan Broekman (born 1931 in Voorburg) a philosopher, legal and social scientist, living in Belgium
- Theo van Boven (1934 in Voorburg – 2026) a jurist and professor emeritus in international law
- Jan de Leeuw (born 1945 in Voorburg) a statistician, psychometrician and academic
- Johannes Willibrordus Maria Hendriks (born 1954 in Leidschendam) the Auxiliary Bishop-elect of the Roman Catholic Diocese of Haarlem-Amsterdam since 2011
- Maxime Verhagen (born 1956) a retired politician, Deputy Prime Minister 2010/2012, lives in Voorburg
- Father Roderick Vonhögen (born 1968 in Leidschendam) a Roman Catholic priest, podcaster and new media producer
- Carla Dik-Faber (born 1971 in Voorburg) an art historian and politician
- Alexander Kops (born 1984 in Leidschendam) a politician

=== The arts ===
- Jacob Elias la Fargue (1735–1778) and Karel la Fargue (1738–1793), brothers and painters
- Marcellus Emants (1848 in Voorburg – 1923) a naturalist novelist
- Cornelis Rol (1877–1963) a graphic artist, painter, lithographer and illustrator; lived and worked in Voorburg from 1929
- Willem van Genk (1927 in Voorburg – 2005) a painter and graphic artist of Outsider Art
- Hans van Hemert (1945 in Voorburg – 2024) a record producer and songwriter
- Toon Verhoef (born 1946 in Voorburg) a painter, ceramist and art lecturer
- Johan de Meij (born 1953 in Voorburg) a conductor, trombonist and composer
- Frans Schrofer (born 1956 in Voorburg) a furniture designer and industrial designer
- Ariane Schluter (born 1966 in Voorburg) a film actress
- Xander de Buisonjé (born 1973 in Voorburg) a singer and TV presenter

=== Sport ===
- Bertha Brouwer (1930 in Leidschendam – 2006) a Dutch sprinter, silver medallist at the 1952 Summer Olympics
- Christiaan van Velzen (born 1932 in Voorburg) a retired Dutch shooter, competed at the 1980 Summer Olympics
- Gerben Karstens (1942 in Voorburg – 2022) a professional racing cyclist, won a team gold medal at the 1964 Summer Olympics
- André Stafleu (born 1955 in Leidschendam) a retired footballer with over 350 club caps
- Peter Blangé (born 1964 in Voorburg) a retired volleyball player, team silver and gold medallist in the 1992 and 1996 Summer Olympics
- Edwin Vurens (born 1968 in Stompwijk) a football manager and former international player with 268 club caps
- Maurits Crucq (born 1968 in Voorburg) a former field hockey defender, team bronze and gold medallist in the 1988 and 1996 Summer Olympics
- Maarten van der Linden (born 1969 in Voorburg) a former rower, team silver medallist at the 1996 Summer Olympics
- Sander van Gessel (born 1976 in Leidschendam) a footballer with 280 club caps
- Pascal Matla (born 1981 in Leidschendam) a former American football player, grew up in Voorburg
- Daan van Bunge (born 1982 in Voorburg) a Dutch cricketer
- Cees Juffermans (born 1982) is a former Dutch short track speed skater, competed at the 2002 and 2006 Winter Olympics
- Eljero Elia (born 1987 in Voorburg) a footballer with over 300 club caps
- Darius van Driel (born 1989 in Leidschendam) a professional golfer who plays on the Challenge Tour
- Daryl Janmaat (born 1989 in Leidschendam) a professional footballer with over 300 club caps
- Inge Janssen (born 1989 in Voorburg) a Dutch rower, team silver medallist at the 2016 Summer Olympics
- Dylan van Baarle (born 1992 in Voorburg), Dutch cyclist, winner of Paris-Roubaix and Omloop Het Nieuwsblad, silver medallist in the 2021 world championships

== Gallery ==
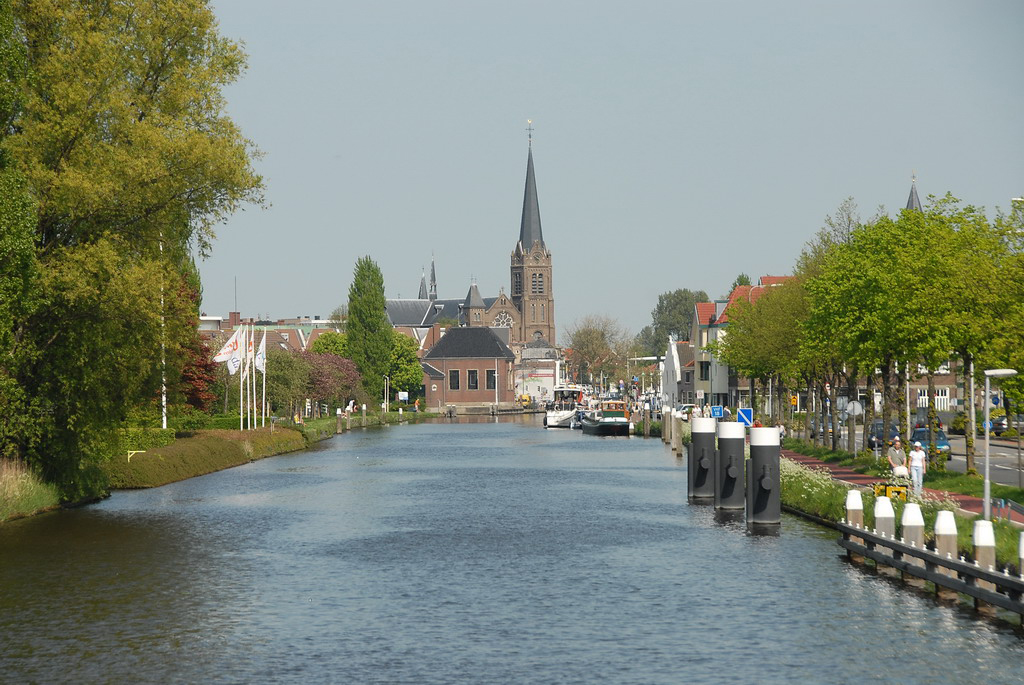
Along The Vliet in Leidschendam

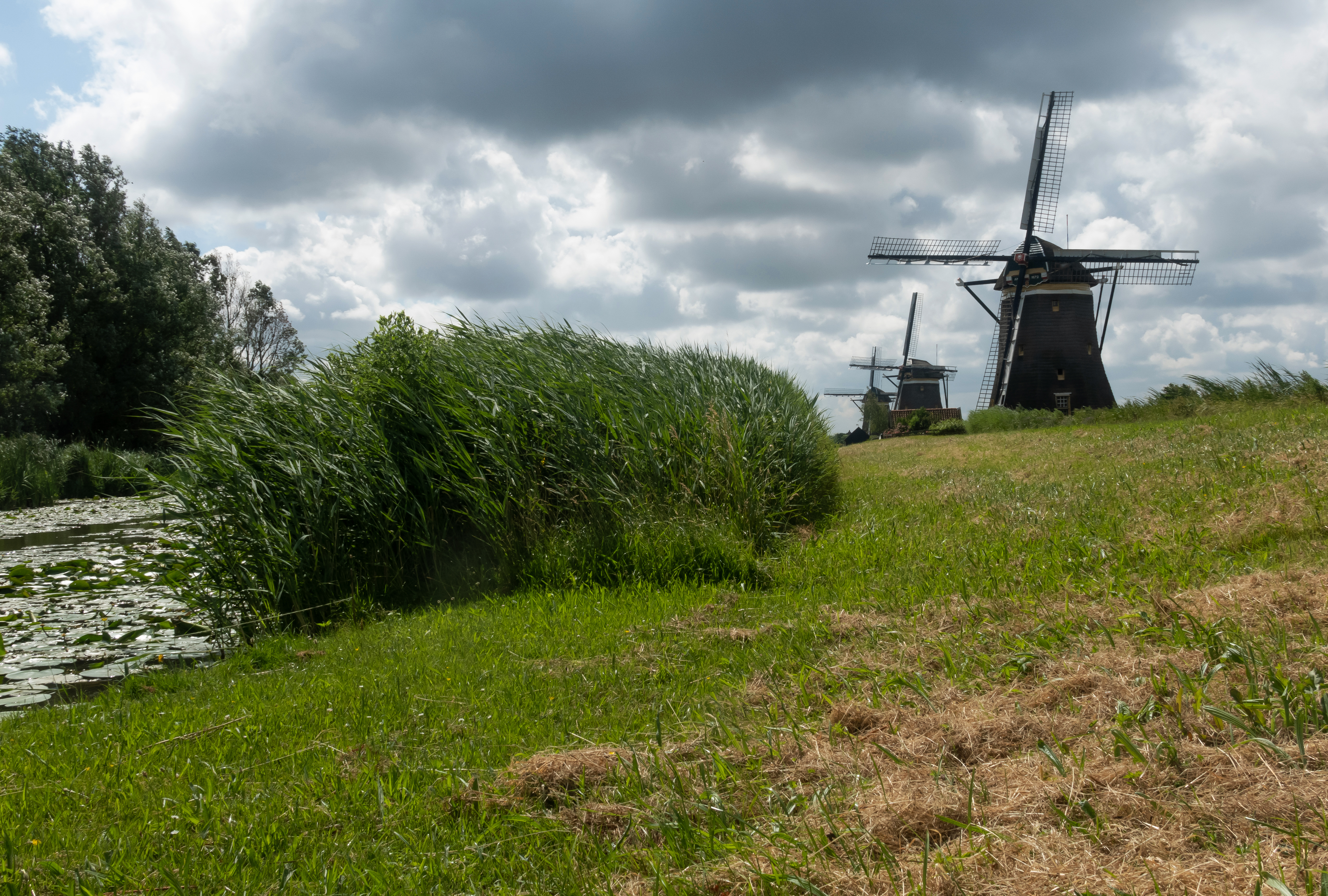
Leidschendam, windmills: the Molendriegang

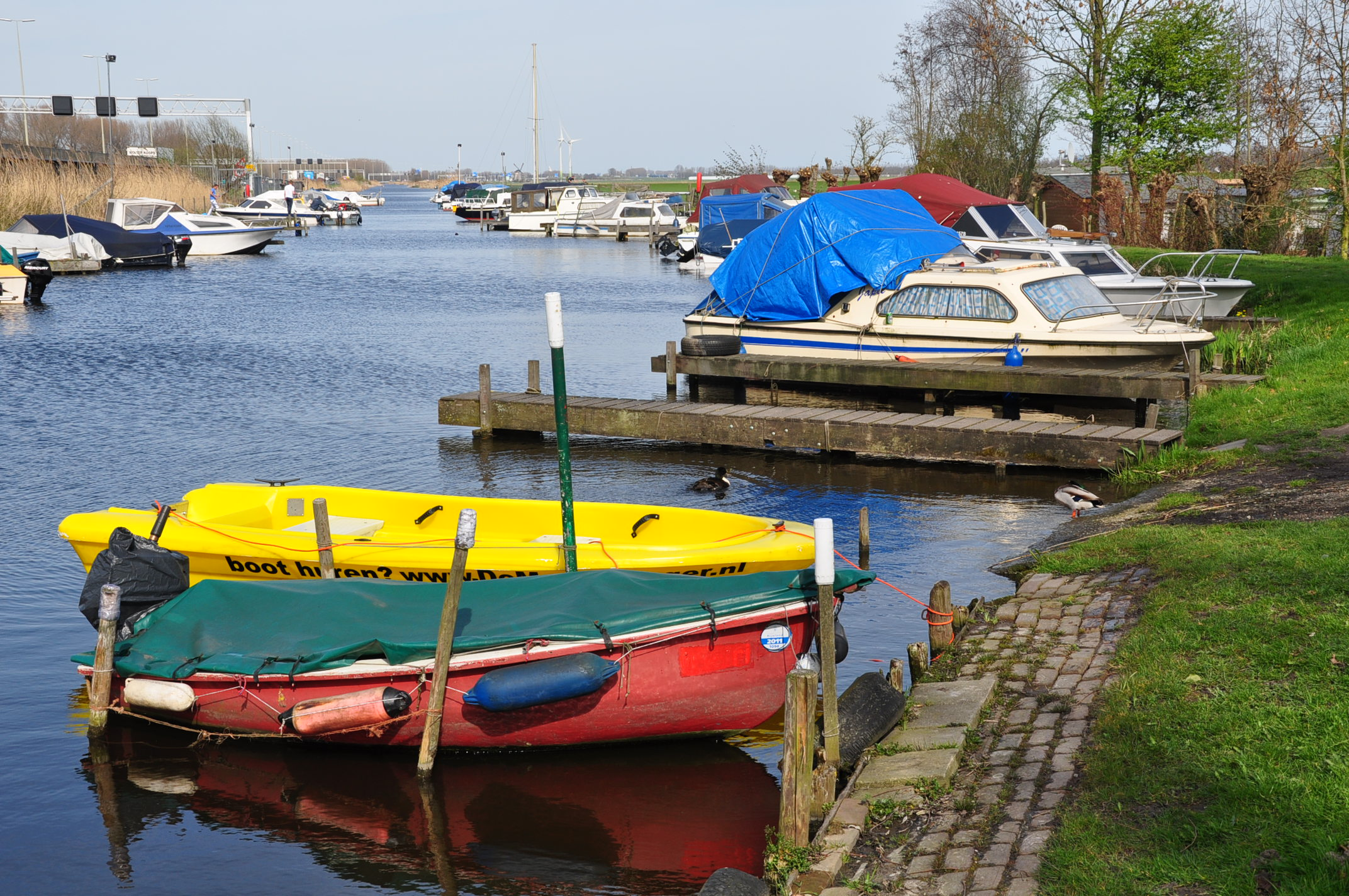
Leidschendam-Voorburg, Meerburger Watering

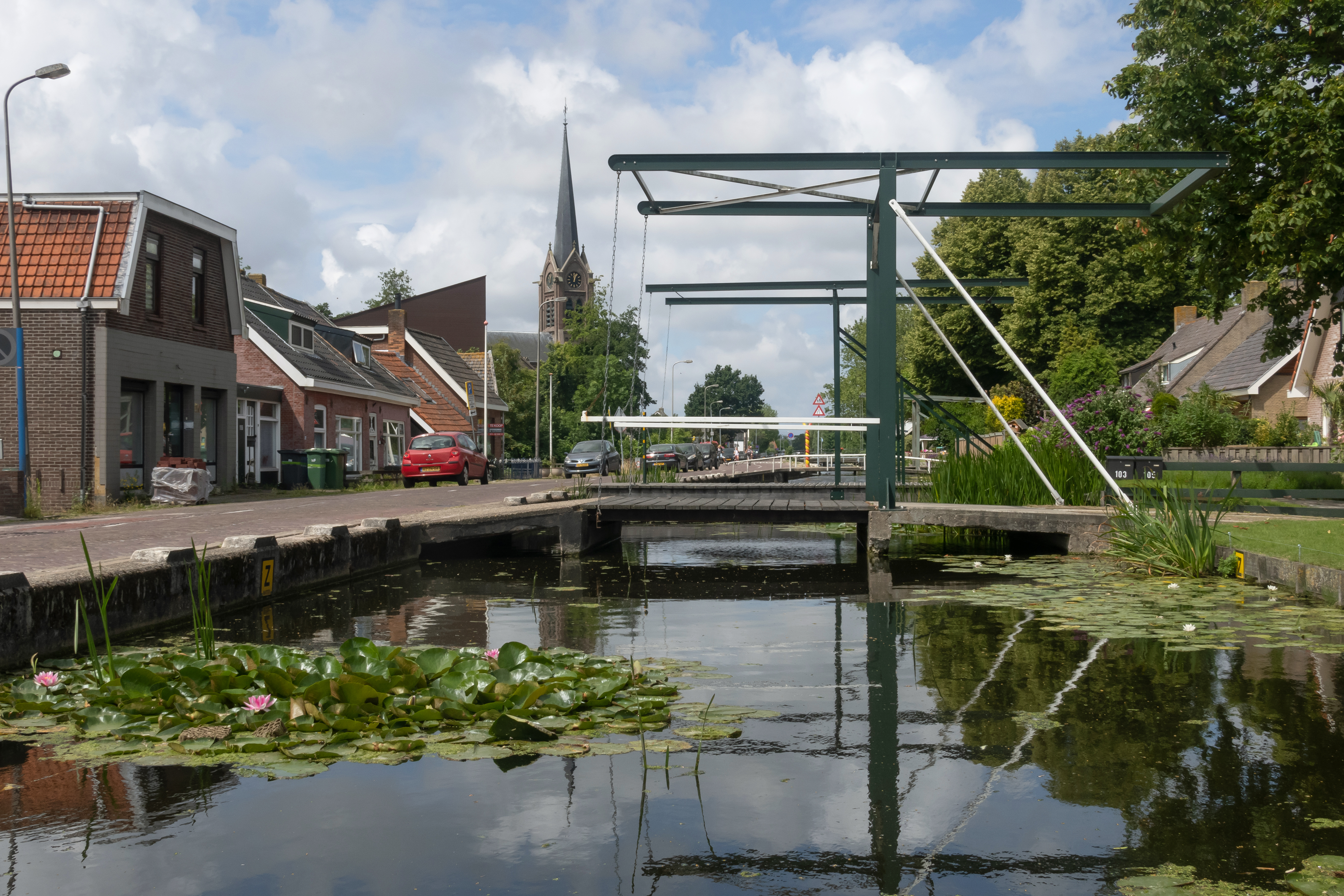
Stompwijk, church (the Sint-Laurentiuskerk) along the canal (the Stompwijkse Vaart)

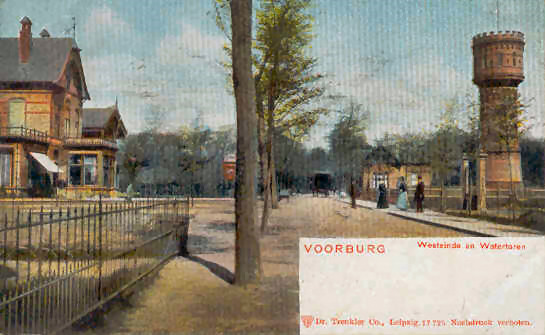
Watertoren Voorburg, 1900
