= Veur =

Coordinates: 52°05′N 4°26′E

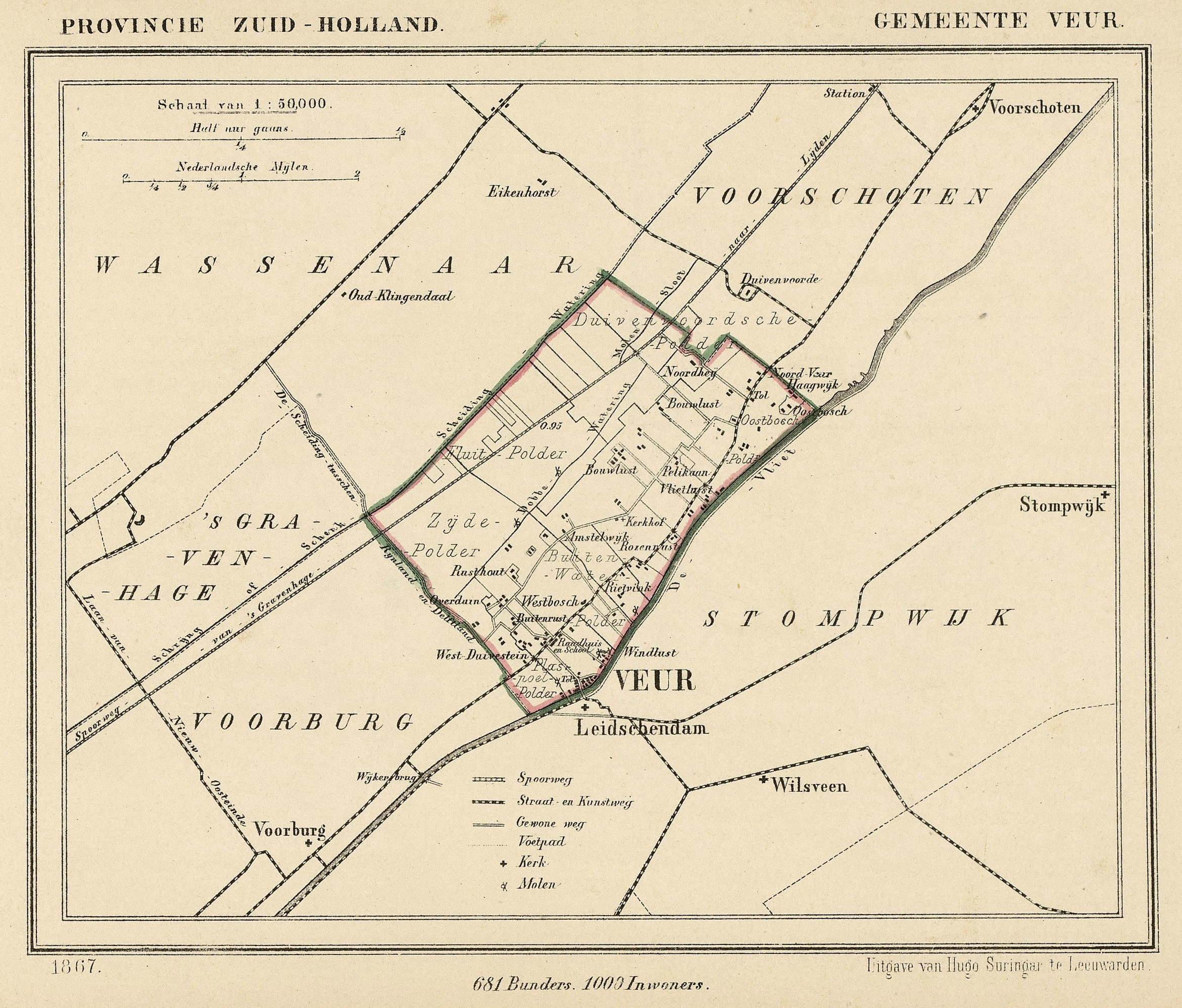
Map of Veur from 1867.

Veur is a former municipality in the Dutch province of South Holland. It covered the northwestern part of the current town of Leidschendam.

Veur was a separate municipality between 1817 and 1938, when it merged with Stompwijk to form the new municipality of Leidschendam.
