= Jan Broekman =

Dutch university teacher

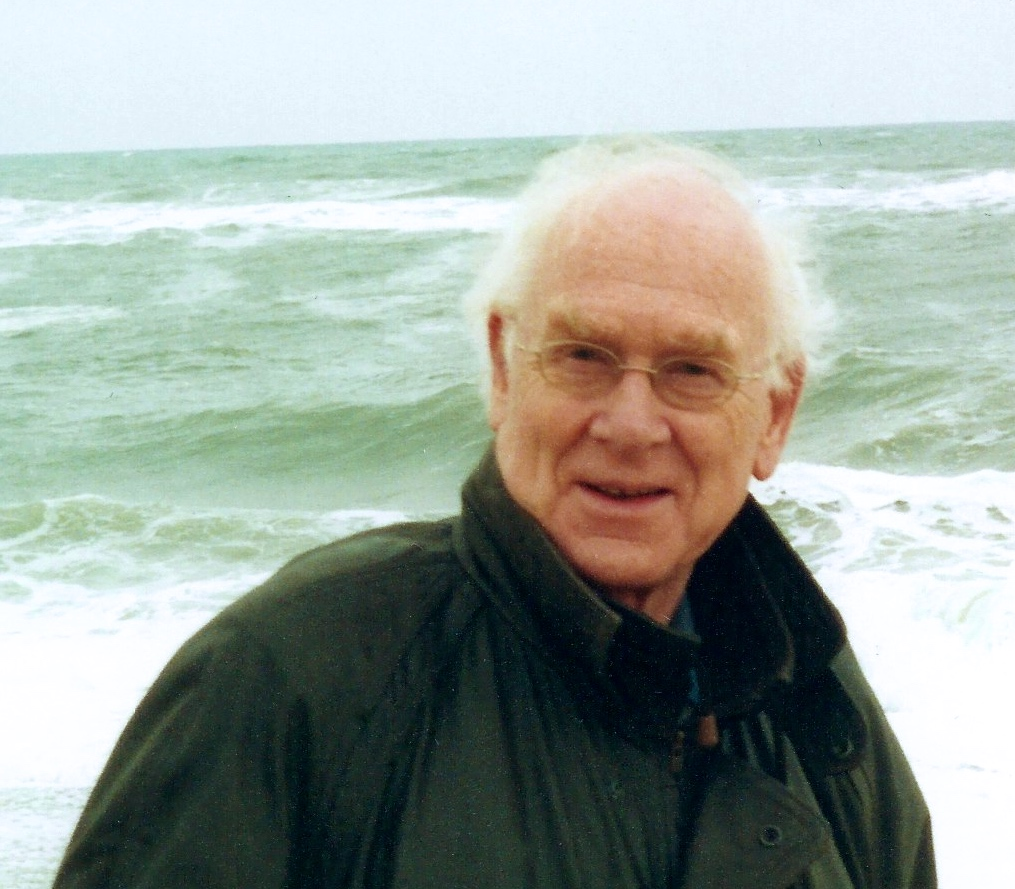
Jan Maurits Broekman

Jan Maurits Broekman (born 1931 in Voorburg) is a Dutch-born philosopher, legal scientist, and social scientist. He worked three decades at the Katholieke Universiteit Leuven and continues to reside in Belgium. In 1971 he published a work on structuralism and in 1979 a book on law and anthropology in German, asserting that the foundations of law are concealed in the specific image of a person.

== Life and work ==
Broekman, born 16 February 1931 in Voorburg, Netherlands, has resided in Belgium since 1968. He studied Sociology and Law at the Rijksuniversiteit Leiden and Philosophy and Psychiatry at the Georg-August-Universität in Göttingen, Germany. His PhD promotion was in 1961 when he defended his thesis "Faktisches und Transzendentales Ego bei Edmund Husserl", written under the direction of Hermann Wein (1912–1981). It was published in 1963 by Martinus Nijhoff, The Hague, in the Series "Phaenomenologica", Vol. 12, entitled "Phänomenologie und Egologie".

From 1961 until 1966 Broekman was Vice Director of the Haagse Sociale Academie, where he taught Philosophy and Social Sciences. From 1966 until 1968 he was Associate Professor Aesthetics and Contemporary Philosophy at the University of Amsterdam. In those years he also taught aesthetics and philosophy at the Academies for Architecture in Amsterdam and Rotterdam, where he participated in discussions with well-known architects on the foundations of their profession. From 1968 until his retirement in 1996 he was Ordinary Professor Contemporary Philosophy at the Institute of Philosophy, University of Leuven and Ordinary Professor Philosophy and Theory of Law at the Faculty of Law of the KU Leuven in Belgium. In 1971 he established in the Law Faculty the "Instituut voor Grondslagenonderzoek van het Recht" [Institute for Research into the Foundations of Law]. From 1988 to 1994 he was dean and respectively pro-dean of the Law Faculty. Inspired by the series "Kolleg Philosophie" of Karl Alber Verlag, Freiburg i. Br., Germany, Broekman published 1971 his "Strukturalismus. Moskau-Prag-Paris", edited 1974 in English in the "Synthese Library", Vol. 65 by Reidel Publishing Cie. He was visiting professor at the University of Cape Town in South Africa in 1972, lecturing on Marxism and Structuralism and presented his "Structuralism in Sociology : Its Theory And Application" to "The Association For Sociology in Southern Africa" in Durban, SA. From 1977 on he edited at the Alber Verlag, Germany, the encyclopedic series "Kolleg Rechtstheorie" he drafted with Meinolf Wewel. In that series he published in 1979 his "Recht und Anthropologie" [Law and Anthropology], in which the image of man was unveiled as a major constitutive factor in law. From here, new determinations pertaining to the constitution of law, to legal theory as well as to legal practice became feasible. The book was foundational for research into the field of legal semiotics, which Broekman unfolded in the second decade of the 21st century.

From 1975 until 1979 Broekman directed with Hans-Georg Gadamer, Ante Pažanin and Bernard Waldenfels the Project and Courses "Phänomenologie und Marxismus" at the Inter-University Center in Dubrovnik (Croatia). Four Volumes resulted from its conferences; they were published by Suhrkamp Verlag in German, two volumes were published in Japanese (1982) and one in English (1984) (See §3).

Parallel to his legal research, Broekman was Professor Philosophy of Medicine and Medical Ethics from 1980 to 1995 at the Vrije Universiteit Amsterdam, where he initiated lectures on the philosophy of medicine, established a research section "Medical Philosophy" and directed numerous doctoral dissertations on medicine and medical philosophy. He was president of the Dutch "Stichting Psychiatrie en Filosofie" from 1985 to 1995. Two Dutch publications resulted from those activities. In 1996, at the occasion of his retirement, his book “Intertwinements of Law and Medicine” was published. It reported about his parallel activities between Law and Medicine and underlined congruencies of the legal and the medical discourse in modern society.

In 1982 Broekman was invited to be a founding member of “The Asociación Argentina de Filosofía del Derecho” in La Plata (Argentina). Since those days, he lectured regularly at many universities and law schools in Argentina, Chile and Colombia. Between 1985 – 2006 he published essays on law and bioethics, on illness and citizenship, on transsexuality, euthanasia and related issues in the journal Jurisprudencia Argentina and other magazines. The 1998 publication Bioetica con Rasgos Juridicos (see §3) focuses upon the close ties between law, medicine and bioethics while providing insight into the relevant Latin-American discussions.

Since his retirement in 1996, Broekman's scientific work unfolds almost exclusively in English: He was a visiting professor of law at the University of Illinois at Urbana–Champaign from 1998 until 2005 lecturing on philosophy of law, law and bioethics, as well as on EU Legal Institutions. In 1998/1999 he wrote his book on the philosophy of EU Law in Urbana-Champaign. In those years he also founded with Dr M. H. Foox (New York) the "IIS Institute" for the advancement of digital education programs and published five studies on that theme. His major focus was on how digital programs change the concept of interactivity, on how the virtual plays a different role in the world of electronic communication and in what ways the unfolding of a human self will touch new dimensions.

In 2006 Broekman was appointed Distinguished Visiting Professor of Law at the Pennsylvania State University, Dickinson School of Law. He lectured on EU law as well as on the Principles of Civil Law and initiated the "Roberta Kevelson Seminar on Law and Semiotics" which he directed until 2013. He published with William A. Pencak two special issues of the "International Journal for the Semiotics of Law" dedicated to those Seminars and the student experiences with legal semiotics. His series on The Semiotics of Law in Legal Education, published by Springer in 2011, comprises in 2017 five volumes.

Broekman's interest in law and language has deepened during his exploration of legal semiotics. Connections between Significs in the Netherlands, the UK, Germany and Switzerland in the beginning of the 20th century and Semiotics of Law in the second half of that century in the US seem to be increasing in importance for legal philosophy of language. In 2018 Legal Signs Fascinate, a volume of the series “SpringerBriefs in Law” on Roberta Kevelson, including a new, corrected and completed Kevelson bibliography was published.

== Festschrifts ==
Two festschrifts were published at the occasion of Broekman's retirement in 1996, one in English and one in Dutch:

- Law, Life and the Images of Man. Modes of Thought in Modern Legal Theory. Festschrift for Jan M. Broekman, Frank Fleerackers, Evert van Leeuwen and Bert van Roermund (Eds), Duncker & Humblot, Berlin, 620 p. ISBN 3 428 08765 8.
- Mens en Recht. Essays tussen Rechtstheorie en Rechtspraktijk. Liber Amicorum Jan M. Broekman Frank Fleerackers (Ed), Peeters, Leuven/Paris, 504 p. ISBN 90 6831 896 9.

== Bibliography ==
Broekman published more than 30 books and 500 scientific articles and essays on law, legal theory, philosophy of medicine and medical ethics, contemporary philosophy, semiotics, education, modern culture and politics in nine languages. Among those the following books:

- Phänomenologie und Egologie. Faktisches und transzendentales Ego bei Edmund Husserl. Phaenomenologica Vol. 12. M. Nijhoff, Den Haag 1963
- Strukturalismus: Moskau, Prag, Paris. Kolleg Philosophie. Alber, Freiburg i. Br./München 1971. ISBN 3-495-47235-5 (Dutch 1972, Spanish 1974, Chinese 1980, expanded Chinese Ed. 2003); English Ed.: Structuralism. Moscow–Prague–Paris, Synthese Library, Reidel, Dordrecht 1974, ISBN 90 277 0478 3
- Kolleg Rechtstheorie. (Ed.) 10 Bände. Alber, Freiburg i. Br./München 1977–1983
- Phänomenologie und Marxismus. 4 Vols. Ed. with B. Waldenfels and A. Pazanin: Suhrkamp, Frankfurt a. M. 1977–1979 (Japanese 2 Vol. 1982); English Ed.:
- Phenomenology and Marxism, J. Claude Evans, (Tr.) Routledge & Kegal Paul, London 1984, ISBN 0 7100 9854 5
- Recht und Anthropologie. Kolleg Rechtstheorie Bd I, 3. Alber, Freiburg i. Br./München 1979. ISBN 3-495-47405-6 (Dutch 1979, 3rd Ed. 1991, Spanish 1993, French 1993)
- Rechtsphilosophie and Rechtstheorie Lemmas in Historisches Wörterbuch der Philosophie, ed. J. Ritter, K. Gründer, G. Gabriel. Schwabe Verlag, Basel vol. VIII, 1992
- Recht, Rechtsfilosofie en Rechtstheorie. Kluwer 1993, ISBN 90 6321 829 X (Spanish 1997)
- Recht en Taal. Preadvies Koninklijke Notariële Broederschap, Deventer 1979, ISBN 90 268 1102 0
- Mens en Mensbeeld van ons Recht. Acco Leuven/Amersfoort 1979, ISBN 90 334 1310 8, 3^{rd} ed. 1986
- Intertwinements of Law and Medicine. Leuven Law Series, vol. 7, Leuven UP 1996 ISBN 906186 7789
- Bioetica con Rasgos Juridicos. Editorial Dilex, S.L. Madrid 1998 ISBN 84 88910 088
- A Philosophy of European Union Law. Positions in Legal Space and the Construction of a Juridical World Image. Peeters Leuven/Paris, 1999 ISBN 90 429 07282
- Recht uit Woorden. Een Cultuurfilosofisch Weefsel. Larcier Brussel, 2004, ISBN 2 80441442 6
- The Virtual in E-Education. New York 2004, ISBN 1 4134 4939 5
- E-education and the Web. New York 2006, ISBN 978 0 595 39139 4
- Binding Words, Unfolding Selves. New York 2008, ISBN 978-0-595-62286-3
- Prospects of Legal Semiotics, Ed. with Anne Wagner. Springer 2010, ISBN 978 90481 9342 4
- The Semiotics of Law in Legal Education, Ed. with Francis J. Mootz III, Springer 2011, ISBN 978 94007 1340 6
- Lawyers Making Meaning, with Larry Catà Backer, Springer 2013, ISBN 978 94007 5457 7
- Signs in Law – A Source Book, Ed. with. Larry Catà Backer, Springer 2015, ISBN 978 3 319 09836 4
- Meaning, Narrativity, and the Real, Springer 2016, ISBN 978 3319 28174 2
- Legal Conversation as Signifier, with Frank Fleerackers, Elgar Studies in Legal Theory, Edward Elgar, UK, 2017. ISBN 978 1 78811 019 8
- Legal Signs Fascinate—Kevelson's Research on Semiotics, ed. with Frank Fleerackers, Springer Cham 2017. eBook ISBN 978-3-319-69520-4
- Rethinking Law and Language. The Flagship 'Speech', Elgar Studies in Legal Theory, Edward Elgar, UK, 2019. ISBN 978 1 78897 661 9
