= N14 expressway (Netherlands) =

Road in the Netherlands

Coordinates: 52°05′36″N 4°22′26″E

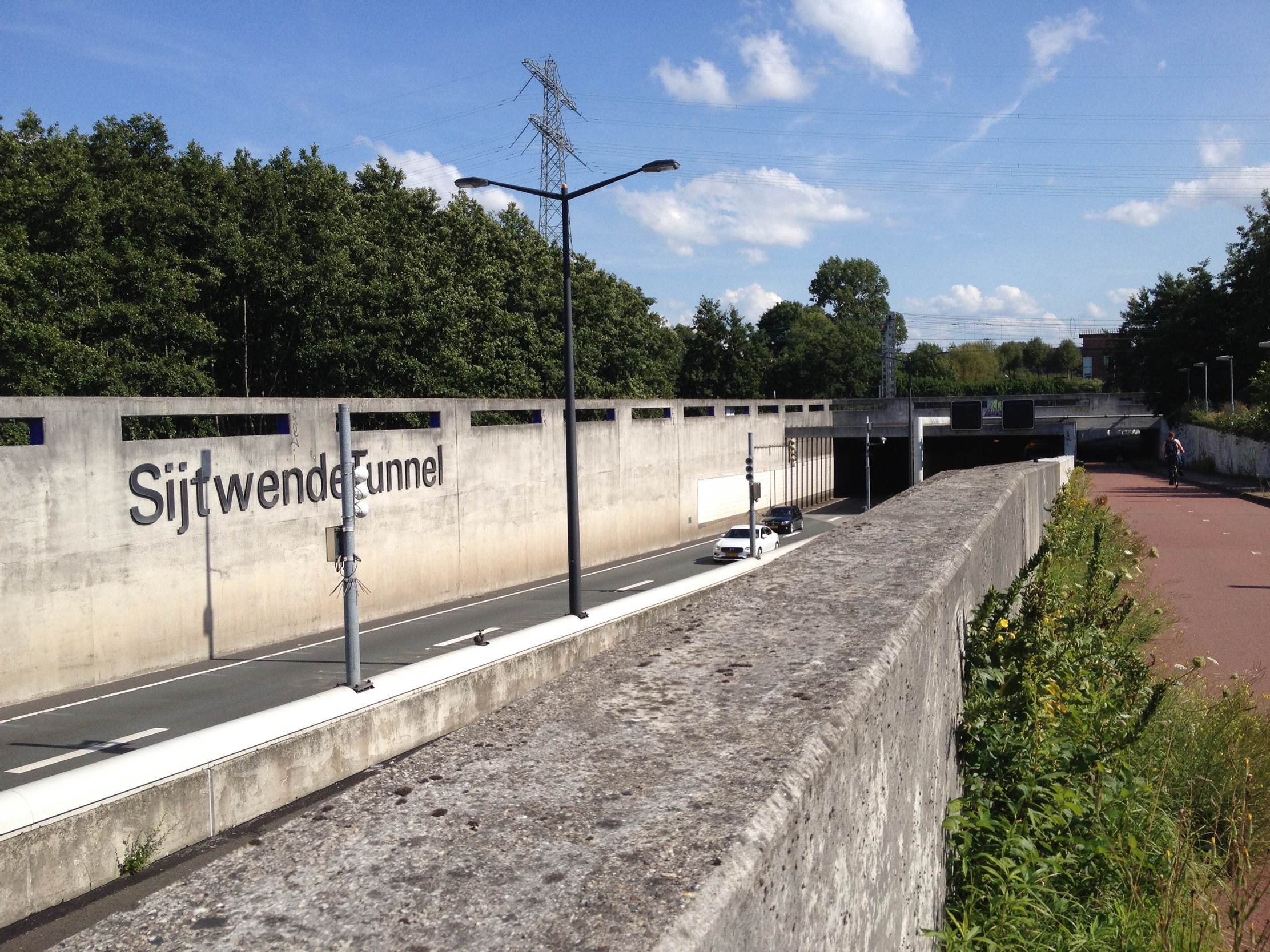
Entrance to the Sijtwende Railway tunnel.

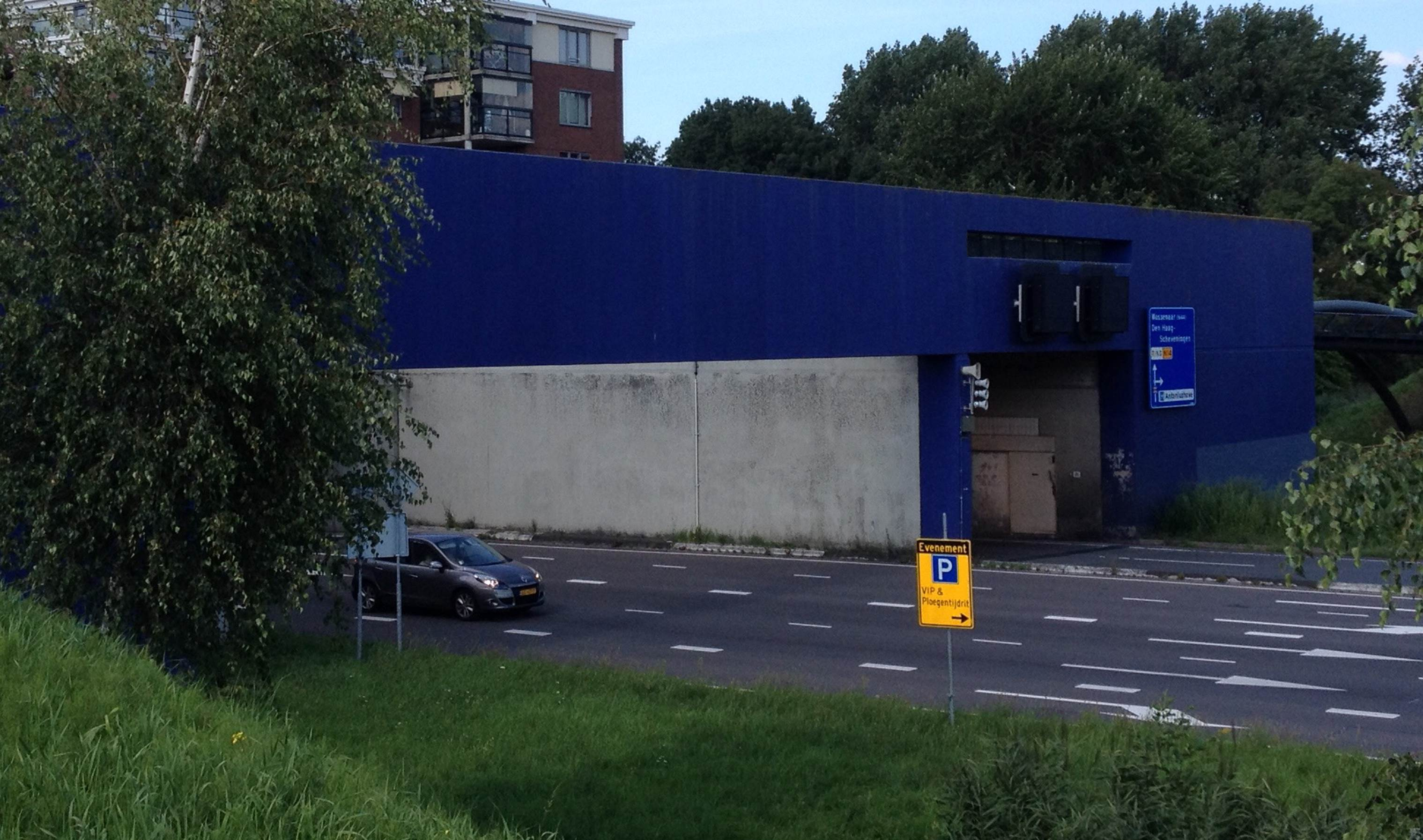
Sijtwende Park tunnel

N14, or Rijksweg 14, is a dual carriageway in the province of South Holland in the Netherlands.

It goes from the end of N440 (western interchange with dual carriageway N44, from The Hague city center to motorway A44) and ends in Motorway A4 and the Hague district Leidschenstad.
It is a part of the Ring Den Haag (The Hague), together with local roads, a part of the A4 and the short N440.
In Leidschendam-Voorburg the N14 runs through the three Sijtwende tunnels, which together are just named Sijtwendetunnel. These tunnels crosses a railway a local road and a canal, but the longest part runs under residential neighbourhoods, partly alove ground in a "levee".
