= Stompwijk =

- Flag Coat of arms
- Interactive map of Stompwijk
- Coordinates: 52°5′40″N 4°28′11″E
- Country: Netherlands
- Province: South Holland
- Municipality: Leidschendam-Voorburg

Area
  - Total: 12.21 km^{2} (4.71 sq mi)

Population
  - Estimate: 3,100

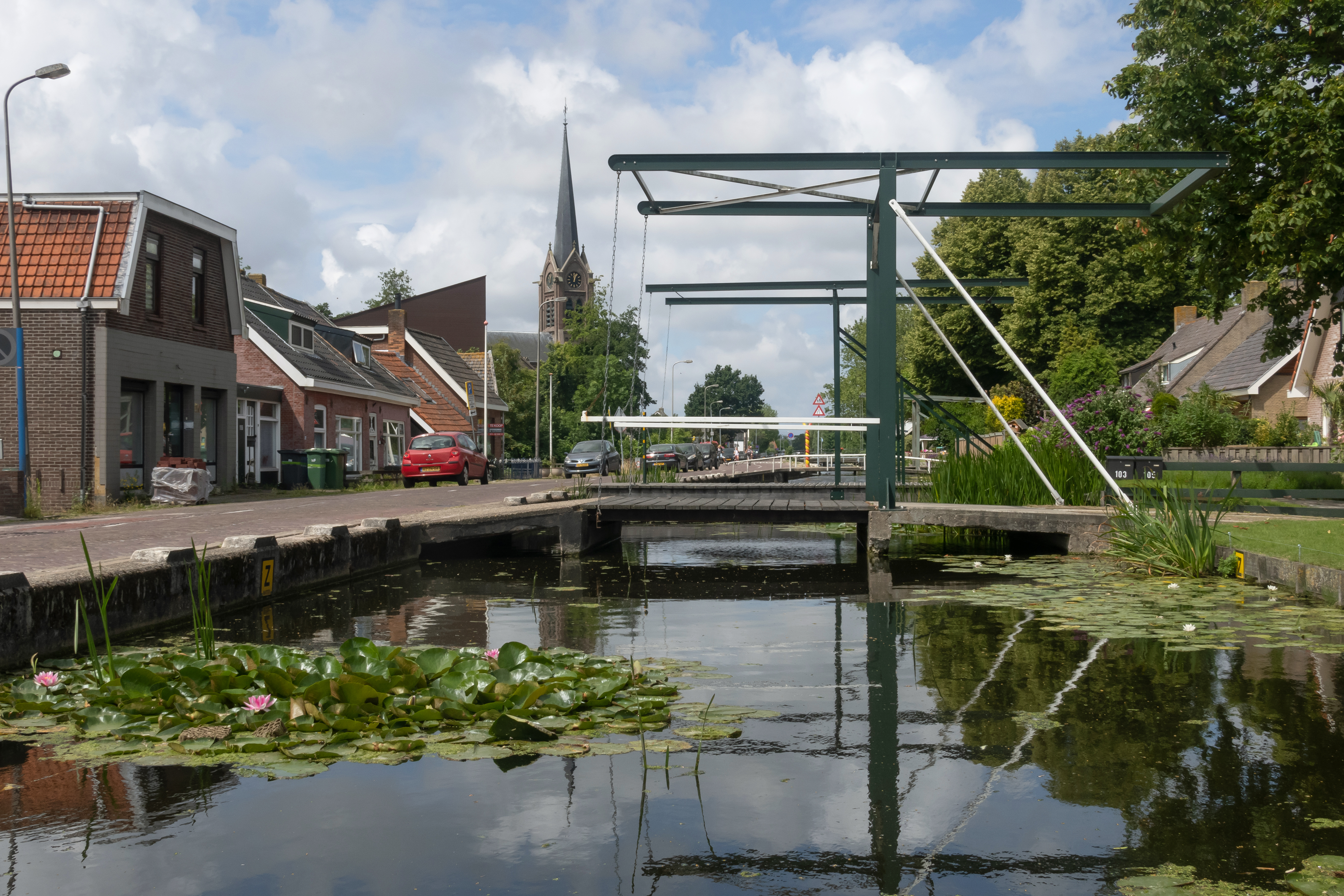
The centre of the village

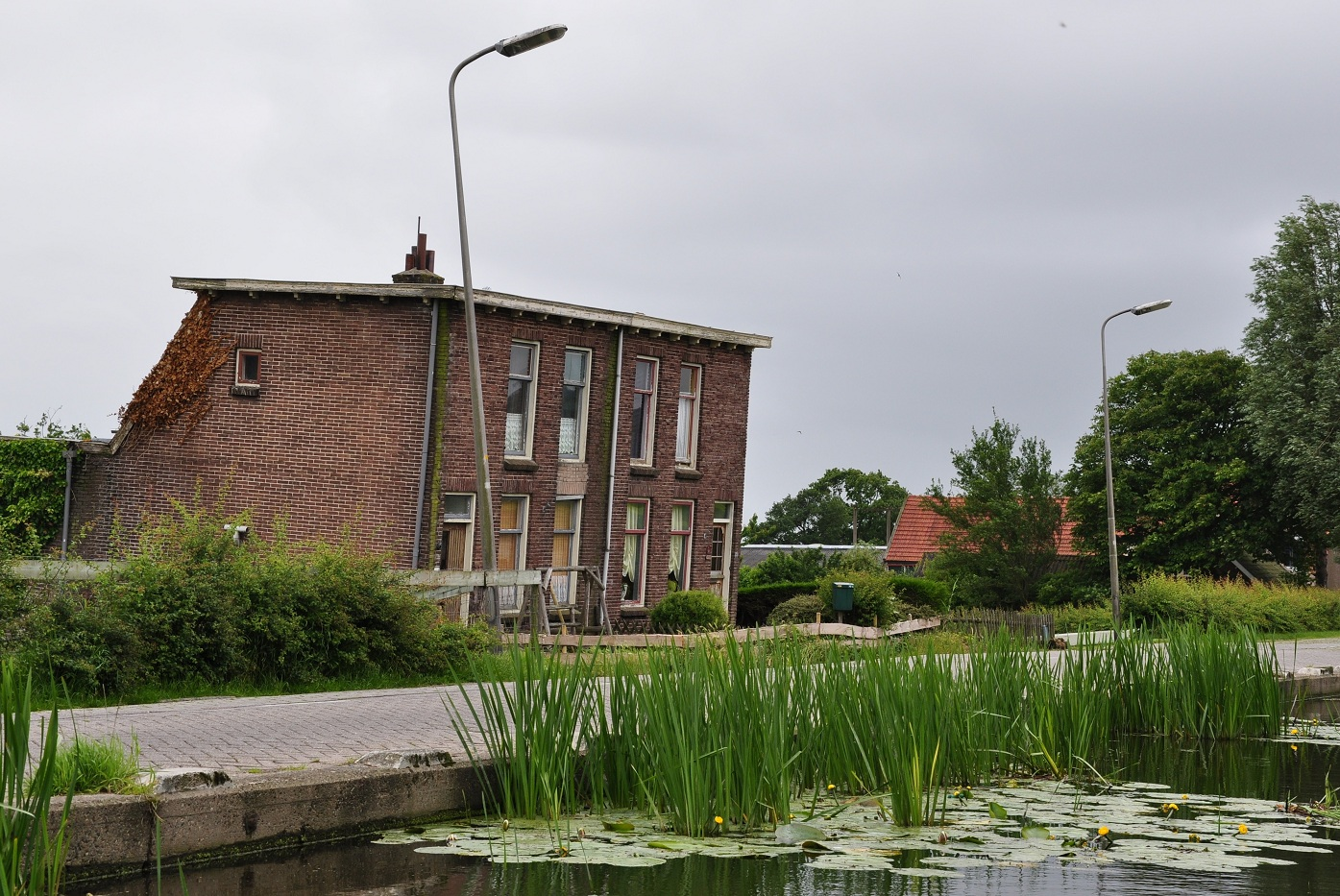
Subsided houses along the dyke at Stompwijk

Stompwijk is a village in the Dutch province of South Holland. It borders Leiden to the North, Zoeterwoude to the East, Zoetermeer to the South, and Voorschoten to the West.

Stompwijk arose together with Wilseveen in the 13th century, and the name can be traced back to 1285 as Stompwiick. The exact origins of its name are unknown.

Stompwijk was a separate municipality between 1817 and 1938, when it merged with Veur to create the new municipality of Leidschendam. In 2002 the municipality of Leidschendam merged with the municipality of Voorburg to create the municipality of Leidschendam-Voorburg, of which Stompwijk has been a part ever since.

As of 2024, 2355 inhabtitants inhabit the core town of Stompwijk. A further 835 inhabitants live in the surrounding rural areas.

== People born in Stompwijk ==
- Gerardus Cornelis van Noort (1861-1946), catholic theologian
- Niek Mooyman (1916-1994), mayor
- Edwin Vurens (1968), football player
- Tim Oliehoek (1979), director
- Cees Juffermans (1982), marathon speed skater
