= Forum Hadriani =

Roman town in South Holland, Netherlands

Coordinates: 52.0601°N 4.3494°E

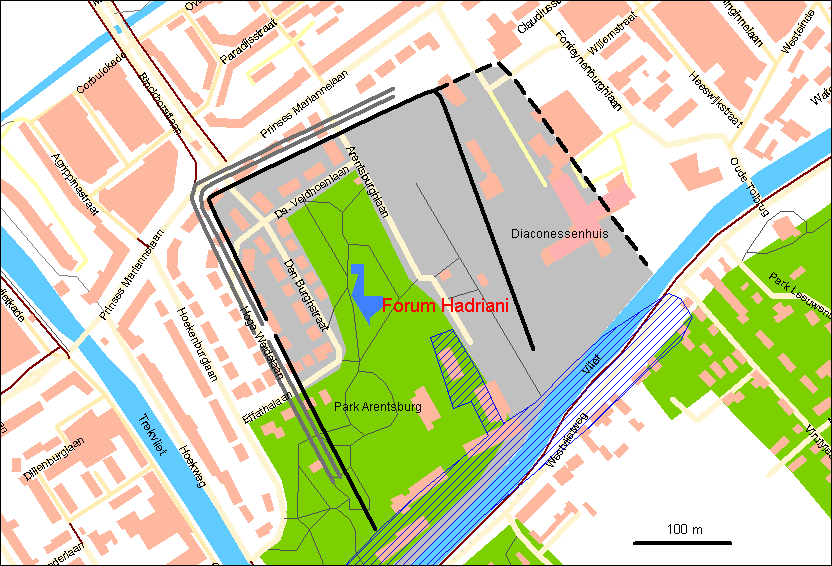
Location of Forum Hadriani in the town Voorburg

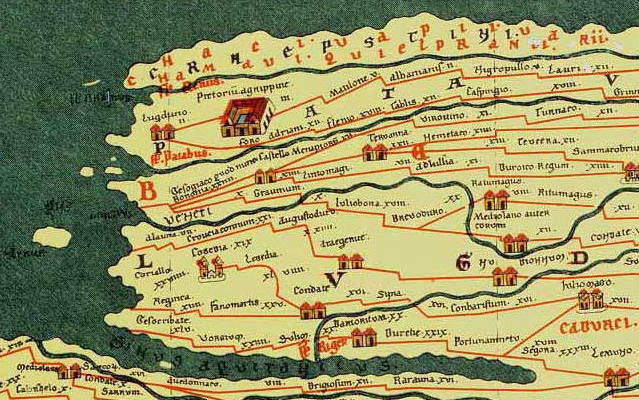
Part of the Tabula Peutingeriana showing foro adriani at the top left

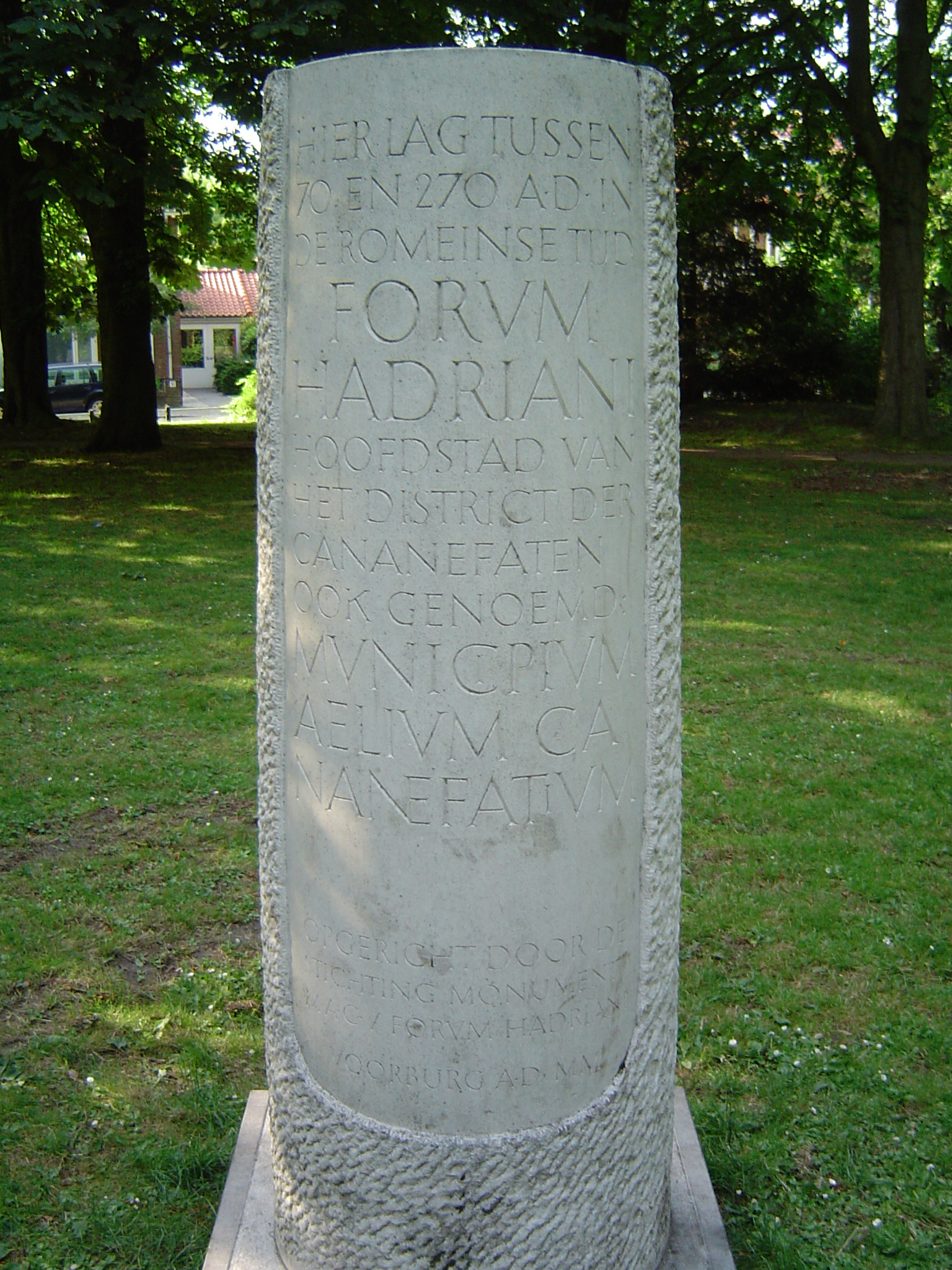
Commemorative monument for Forum Hadriani in Voorburg.

Forum Hadriani, in the modern town of Voorburg, was the northernmost Roman city on the European continent and the second oldest city of the Netherlands. It was located in the Roman province Germania Inferior and is mentioned on the Tabula Peutingeriana, a Roman road map.

Established probably between 69-70, soon after or during the Batavian Revolt, and initially called Municipium Cananefatium (Town of the Cananefates), the site Forum Hadriani formed the nucleus of the civitas of the Cananefates, who lived west of the Batavians. It was situated along the Fossa Corbulonis or Corbulo-canal (largely following the route of today's Vliet). This waterway was established about 47 AD by the Roman general Gnaeus Domitius Corbulo, forming an important shortcut between the rivers Rhine and Meuse. After the Batavian Rebellion, in which they participated, the Cananefates became loyal allies of the Romans.

In 121, emperor Hadrian made a long voyage along the northwestern border of the empire, during which he probably visited the Cananefate town. It is theorized that during this period, the town adopted the name Forum Hadriani to honor the ruler, a common practice at the time. As a regional capital, the town would have already had the right to organize markets before Hadrian's reign. An alternate name, maybe the only official name, was Municipium Aelium Cananefatium (Aelius being the family name of Hadrian). The shortened version of this name, MAC, has been found engraved in a couple of Roman milestones found in the neighbourhood. Yet, the old name of the town was still in use during the reign of Decius (249-251).

About 270 AD, after several plagues and attacks by Saxon pirates and the reconquering of the region from the Gallic Empire, the Romans abandoned Forum Hadriani.

In 1771 a bronze right hand was excavated during garden work on the Arentsburg estate. This hand was used by Étienne Maurice Falconet as model for the equestrian statue of Peter the Great, The Bronze Horseman. The first scientific excavations at the site of Forum Hadriani were carried out by Caspar Reuvens, between 1827 and 1833. Reuvens held the world's first professorship of archaeology. Reuvens died before he could publish his findings. More excavations were done between 1908 and 1915 by Jan Hendrik Holwerda, who published the results of Reuvens together with his own discoveries in a comprehensive monograph in 1923.

The park Arentsburgh in modern Voorburg roughly corresponds with the site of the ancient town, but further excavations cannot currently be undertaken due to it being part of a UNESCO World Heritage Site.

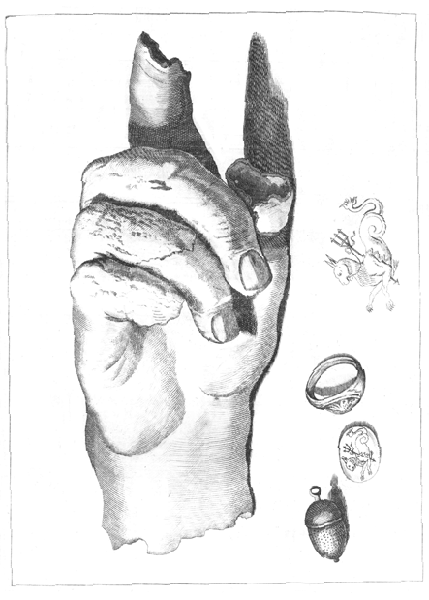
Drawing (1800) of a bronze hand found in 1771

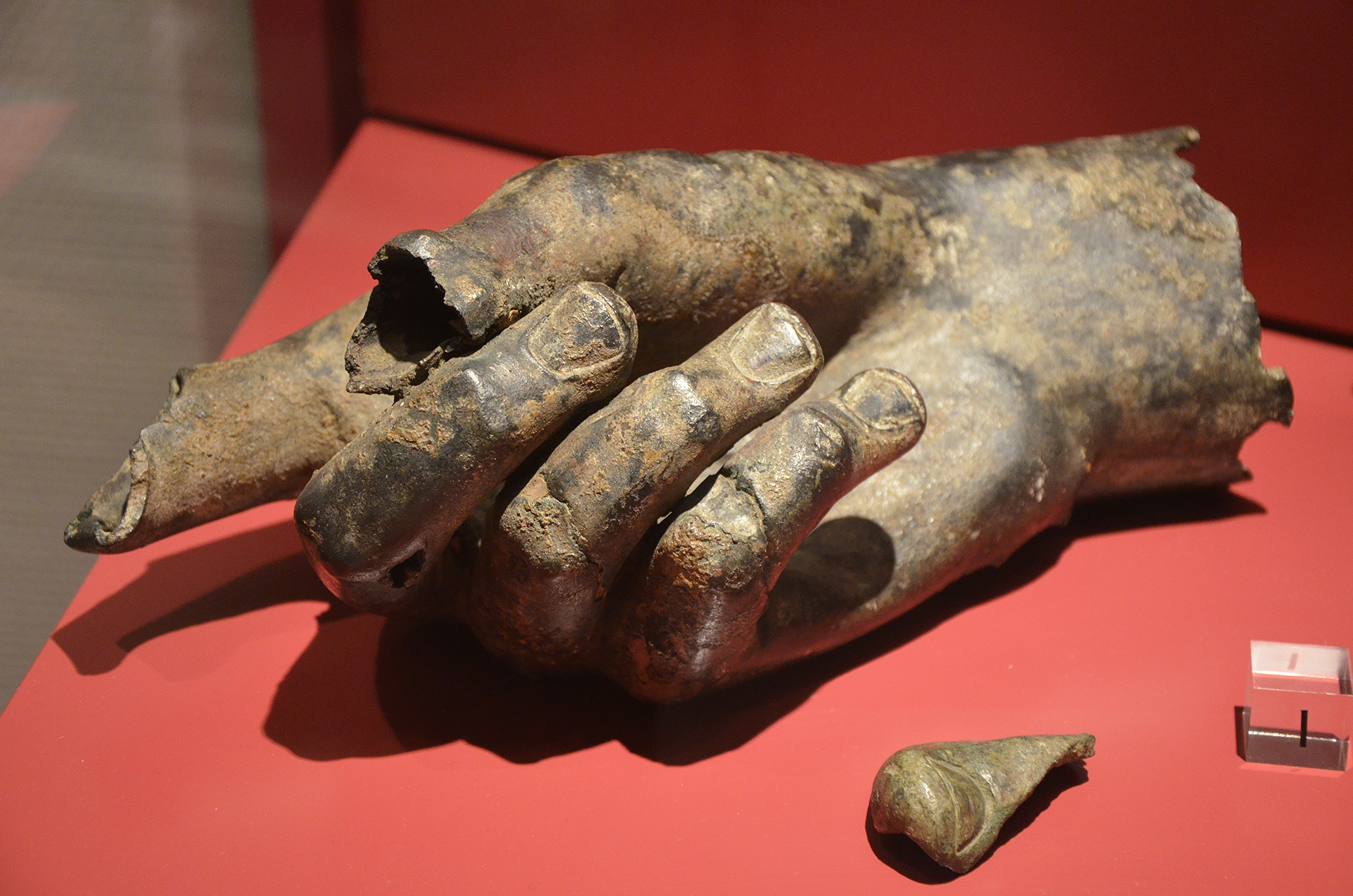
Same hand on display in the Museum van Oudheden in Leiden

== See also ==
- List of Latin place names in Continental Europe
