= Carla Dik-Faber =

Dutch art historian and politician

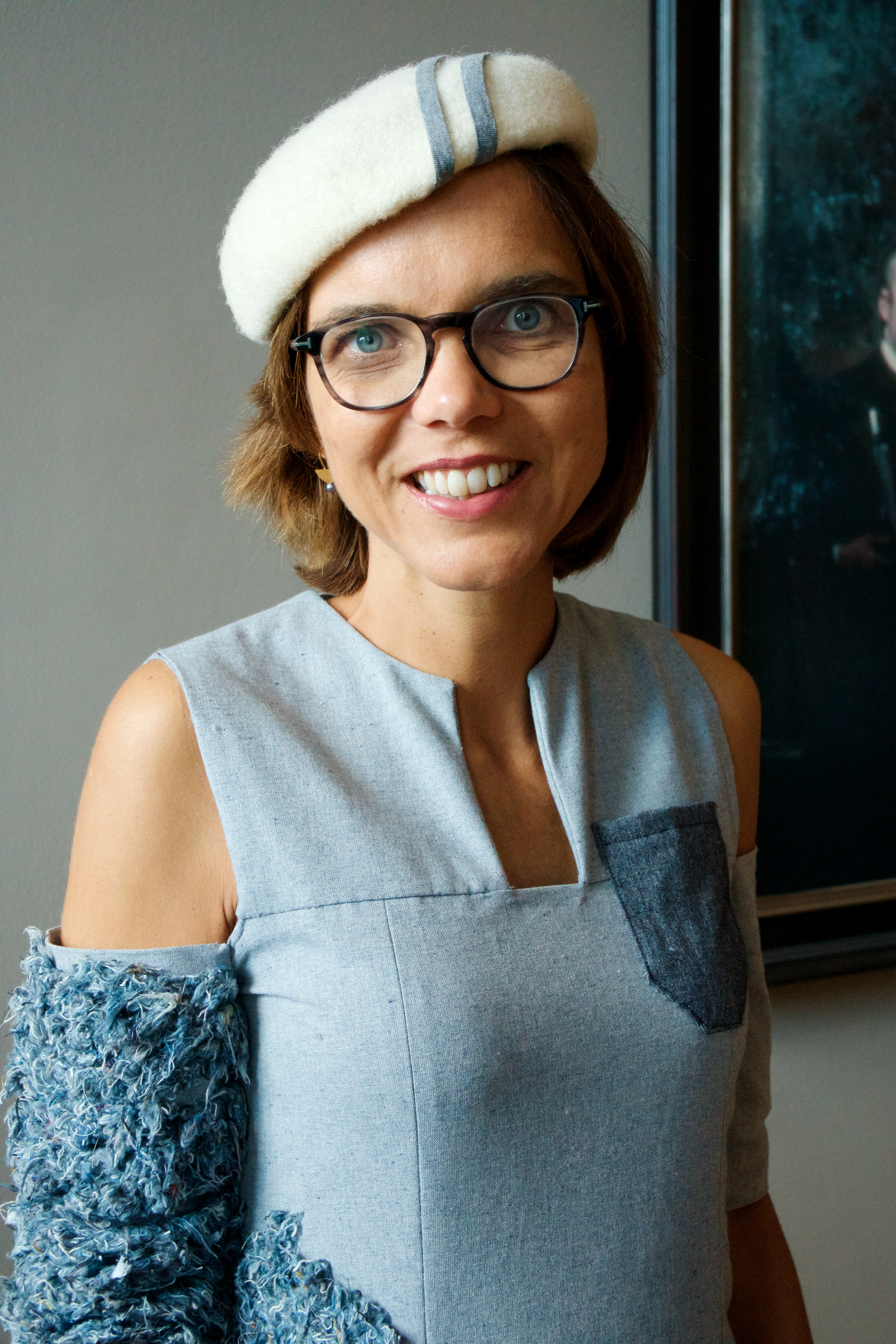

Member of the House of Representatives
- In office 20 September 2012 – 6 December 2021

Personal details
- Born: Roelofje Klazina Dik-Faber; 6 May 1971 (age 55) Voorburg
- Party: ChristianUnion
- Occupation: Politician

Roelofje Klazina (Carla) Dik-Faber (born 6 May 1971 in Voorburg) is a Dutch art historian and politician. As a member of the ChristianUnion (ChristenUnie) she has been a Member of Parliament since 20 September 2012. She was a member of the municipal council of Veenendaal from 2003 to 2010 and a member of the States-Provincial of Utrecht from 2007 to 2012.

Carla Dik-Faber studied art history at Utrecht University. She is married and a member of the Netherlands Reformed Churches.
