= Marcellus Emants =

Dutch novelist

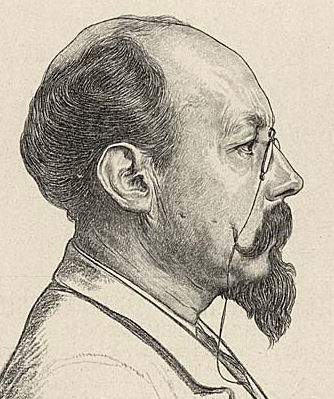
- Marcellus Emants (1897) by Theo Kerstel
- Born: Marcellus Emants; 12 August 1848; Voorburg, Netherlands
- Died: 14 October 1923 (aged 75); Baden, Switzerland
- Resting place: The Hague, Netherlands
- Education: Leiden University
- Occupations: Novelist, playwright, poet
- Writing career
- Language: Dutch

Marcellus Emants (12 August 1848 – 14 October 1923) was a Dutch novelist whose work is considered one of the few examples of Dutch Naturalism. His writing is seen as a first step towards the renewing force of the Tachtigers towards modern Dutch literature, a movement which started around the 1880s. His most well-known work is A Posthumous Confession, published in 1894, translated by J. M. Coetzee.

== Biography ==
Marcellus Emants was born on 12 August 1848 in Voorburg, Netherlands. He was born in a family of magistrates from The Hague. His father was the judge Guilliam Balthasar Emants (1818–1870) and his mother was Anna Elisabeth Petronella Verwey Mejan (1824–1908).

Emants went to the hogereburgerschool in The Hague and completed the five-year program. In 1868, at the age of 20, he started his Law studies at the Leiden University in Leiden. Emants complied with his father's wish to study Law, until his father's death in 1871.

Emants did well at university, but his heart lay with the arts, not with legal matters. Initially he could not choose between music (cello), drawing, theatre and literature. He avoided the student scene in the Dutch university town of Leiden, but founded a literary club, Quatuor, with a few friends from The Hague. His first publication would feature in the club’s magazine.

After his father’s death, he became financially independent, broke off his studies and took to travelling the world. He seemed better at ease in the Alps than in the lowlands and as a result made yearly trips to the former. In Quatuor’s successor, Spar en Hulst (Pine and Holly) he wrote an essay entitled Bergkristal van Oberammergau (Mountain crystal of Oberammergua) in 1872 about the Passion plays which he had attended there. He himself was a bit surprised about the attention which his text had attracted, but kept on travelling and developed a genre of ‘travel account which is much more than a travel account.’ (Busken Huet)

Although he shared the Tachtigers' vision of the arts' autonomy, Emants kept outside of their group, as he felt he could not participate in their elaborate use of language: ‘I have always wanted to aspire to, if I was reading a book, noticing the words as little as possible.’ Despite this ideal, he would still be called ‘the Johannes Baptista of modern literature' by Willem Kloos, who was one of the leading figures of the 1880s.

Emants kept a sober style and a subject which was idealistically pessimistic. His examples were Émile Zola, Hippolyte Taine and Ivan Turgenev, with the latter even keeping correspondence.

He was vice-president of the ‘Vereniging tot vereenvoudiging van onze spelling’ (Society for the Simplification of our Spelling) and wrote A Posthumous Confession (1894); (Dutch Een nagelaten bekentenis) translation: J. M. Coetzee, 1976; reissued 2011). He attended the state commission for the reform of Dutch spelling as well, which did not succeed in its setup however. 11 long years after his death, though, Minister of Education Marchant would still implement the proposals made by this commission anyway.

During the First World War, Emants felt locked up within the Netherlands and when Armistice was finally there, he made preparations to go and establish himself in Switzerland. On 2 March 1920, he finally left The Hague forever and stayed in Switzerland alternatingly in hotels, spa towns and sanatoria. Almost immediately he was struck by shingles, followed by a few strokes. He died on 20 October 1923 in the Grand Hôtel in Baden and was interred in The Hague on the General Cemetery.

=== Family ===
Marcellus Emants was married three times. A first time to Christina Magdalena Prins, a distant cousin, in 1873. He was sadly widowed two years after the marriage, in 1875. Then he married Eva Vemiers van der Loef on 10 July 1880. She published a novel in 1887 under the pseudonym Nessuno: Beemsen Esquire and died in 1900. On 5 July 1904, he married the German actress Jenny Kühn. Although the marriage was a disaster, they did have a daughter Eva Clara Jenny whom he adored and spoilt. She would later call herself Lillith after a work of his from 1879.

== Publications (in English) ==
- Marcellus Emants: A posthumous confession. Transl. from the Dutch and with an introd. by J. M. Coetzee. New York, 2011. ISBN 9781590173473
