= Leidschendam =

- Town
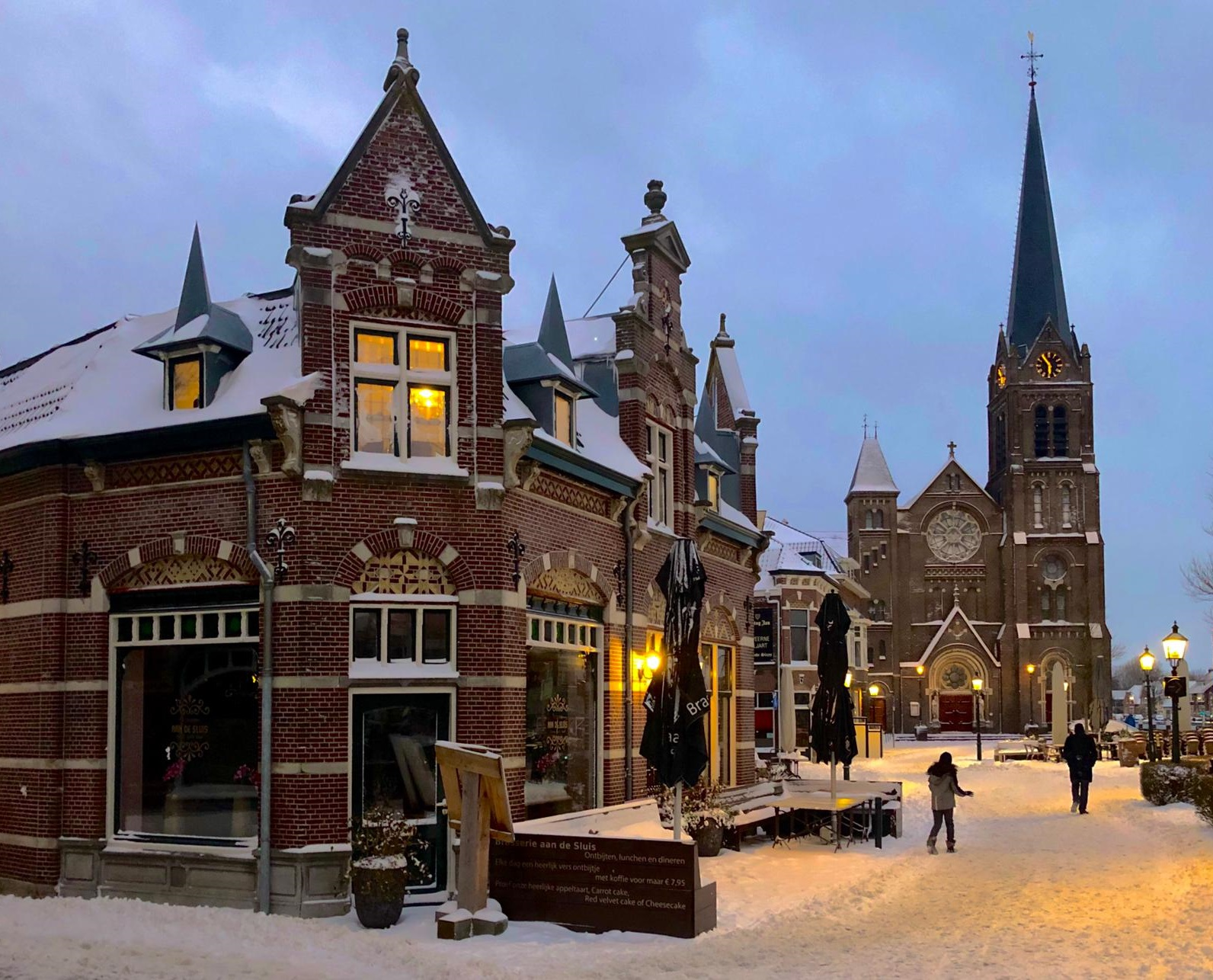
- Town center on a winter evening

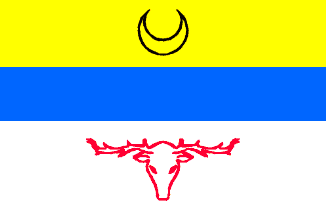
- Flag Coat of arms

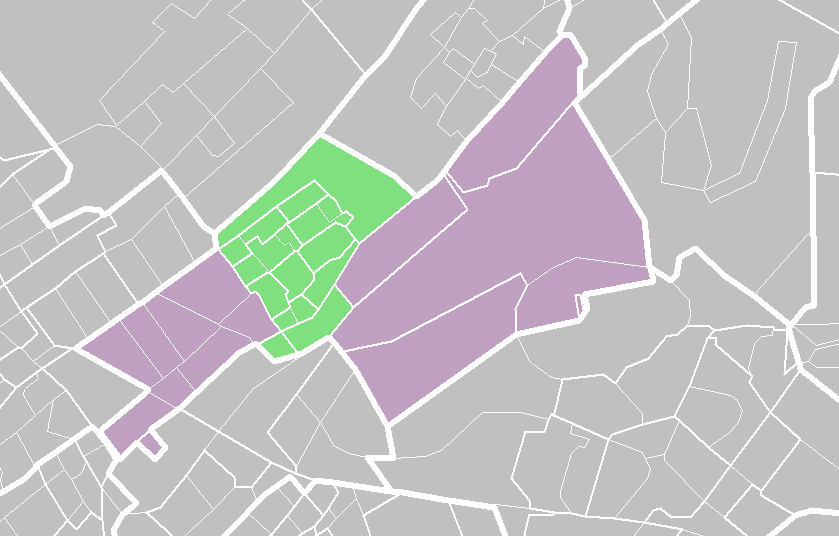
- Location in Leidschendam-Voorburg

- Location of Leidschendam-Voorburg in South Holland
- Coordinates: 52°5′N 4°24′E
- Country: Netherlands
- Province: South Holland
- Municipality: Leidschendam-Voorburg

Area
  - Total: 8.44 km^{2} (3.26 sq mi)
  - Land: 8.22 km^{2} (3.17 sq mi)
  - Water: 0.23 km^{2} (0.089 sq mi)
- Elevation: 0 m (0 ft)

Population (2012)
  - Total: 32,480
  - Density: 3,951/km^{2} (10,230/sq mi)
- Demonym: Leidschendammer
- Time zone: UTC+1 (CET)
  - Summer (DST): UTC+2 (CEST)
- Postcode: 2260–2268
- Area code: 070

Leidschendam (Dutch pronunciation: [ˈlɛitsə(n)ˌdɑm]) is a town and former municipality in the province of South Holland of the Netherlands. Along with Voorburg and Stompwijk, it is part of the municipality Leidschendam-Voorburg.

== History ==
The town's name has been in use for centuries and refers to the lock in the Vliet, near the historic city of Leiden. The settlement on the northern side of the lock was known as 'Veur', until the formation of the municipality of Leidschendam in 1938. This recent date belies the long history of human habitation in this area, which predates the Roman occupation two thousand years ago.

Important driver for the development of the area was the Vliet canal, ferrying people and goods through Holland in the Middle Ages, and even in Roman times. As elsewhere in Holland, windmills were constructed to power local industry, such as a wheat grinding mill in 1594 and wood processing mills in 1643 and 1739 ('de Salamander' and 'de Hoop'). Veur became an independent municipality in the time of the short-lived Batavian Republic.

The southern side of the Vliet was settled at a later date due to presence of extensive swamps. These were drained around 1200 by the Dutch counts, enabling the settlements of Stompwijk and Wilsveen to be established. Subsequently, the peat industry flourished, and about twenty windmills were constructed for water management. In 1811, Stompwijk and Veur were combined to form Leidschendam, but this was reversed only six years later, although one mayor continued to serve both villages.

Starting in the closing years of the 19th century, the area started to change rapidly due to combined forces of the agricultural crisis, improved transportation in the area, and regional effects of the first and second World Wars. A growing number of government and industrial activities (the Dutch political capital of The Hague is nearby) and the associated housing demand transformed Veur from a rural into a suburban community. This led to a municipal reorganization and the formation of Leidschendam, in 1938. Both Leidschendam and Voorburg are now part of the agglomeration of the city of The Hague and are often regarded as its suburbs. Stompwijk is still a rural village, located a few miles northeast of Leidschendam. All three were combined into the municipality of Leidschendam-Voorburg in 2002 (population: 73.832 in 2004, area: 35,6 km^{2}) as an answer to a series of small annexations from surrounding municipalities made by The Hague.

== Economy ==
In terms of percentage of population, the main economic activities are real estate and commercial services, retail and hotel/restaurants, medical care, transportation and communication, and government. In 2002, the unemployment rate was 13.1%.

A large, covered, shopping area, Westfield Mall Of The Netherlands, exists near the border with Voorburg. Mall of the Netherlands contains a large number of retailers, including large chains such as Albert Heijn, Jumbo, and C&A, as well as medium and smaller-sized shops and restaurants. Drawing large numbers of people, the area is a focal point of road and rail traffic in the area. Leidschendam also hosts the headquarters of Fugro, a multinational company providing geotechnical and surveying services. Leidschendam hosted the main office of the country's intelligence service, the AIVD, which is an integral part of the Dutch Ministry of the Interior, before the office moved to Zoetermeer in 2007. The building then hosted the UN Special Tribunal for Lebanon to try those suspected of assassinating former Lebanese Prime Minister Rafik Hariri. Voorburg hosted CBS "Centraal Bureau voor de Statistieken" Statistics Netherlands, the Dutch census office until mid 2008 when it moved to a new office in The Hague – Leidschenveen.

== Demographics ==
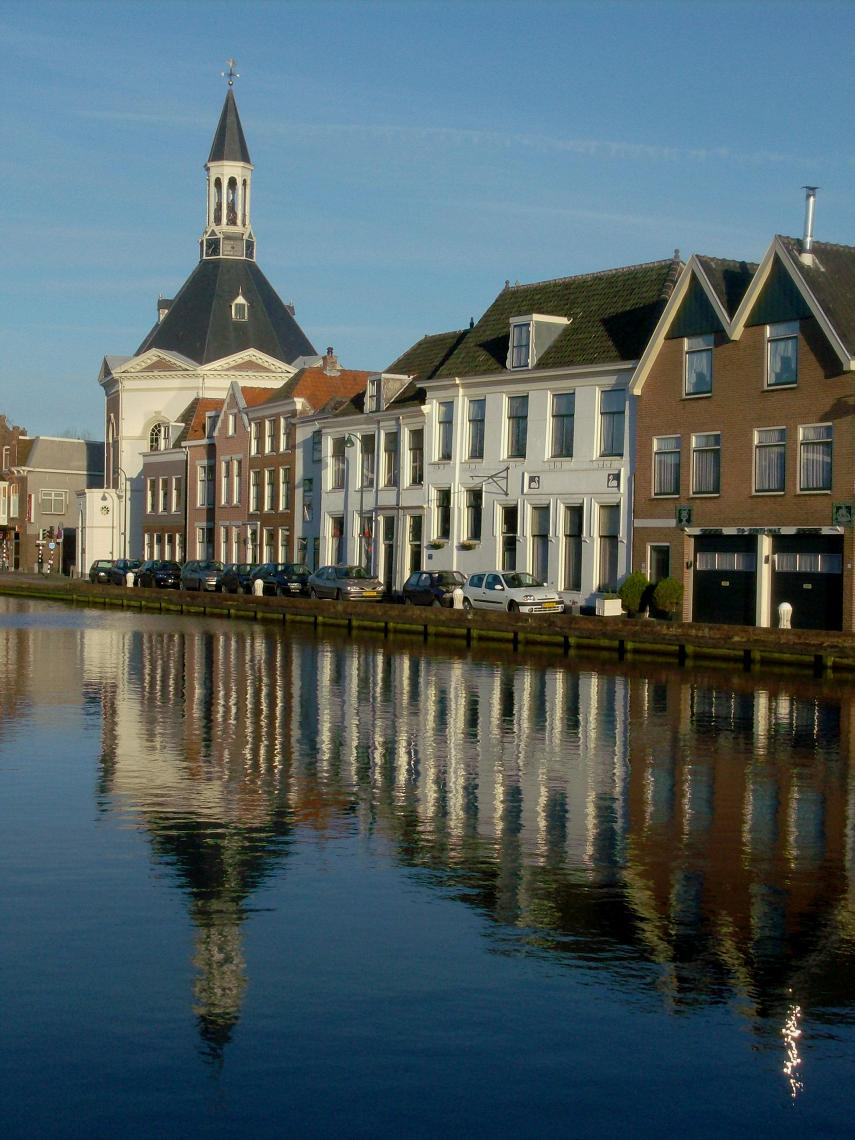
Protestant church along the Vliet

As of 31 December 2001, about 40% of the population has a college degree or better, ranking ninth out of the fifty largest cities in The Netherlands. About 25% has a low education level (presumably high school at most), also ranking ninth.

For Leidschendam-Voorburg combined, having a total population of 73,148 (Leidschendam alone: 31,289), 21% is below the age of 20, while 15% is above age 70. There are 34,894 men (47.7%) and 38,254 women (52.3%). There are 31,892 (43.6%) unmarried people, 30,764 (42.1%) married, 5,075 widowed (6.9%), and 5,416 (7.4%) divorced. There are 21,044 (28.8%) people in households with a partner having no children, 18,957 (25.9%) children living at home, 17,092 (23.4%) people in households with a partner having one or more children, 12,156 (16.6%) living without partner and without children, 2,174 (3.0%) living without partner and with one or more children, 814 (1.1%) in institutional settings, and 1,848 (2.5%) which do not fall in any of these categories.

There are 14,540 living units in Leidschendam, of 34,290 total in Leidschendam-Voorburg. Of these, 18,120 are owned units, 10,260 are subsidized rental units and 5,250 are private rental units. There are 9,230 units built prior to 1940, 9,470 between 1940–1970, and 14,930 since 1970. The make-up of the units is close to 1/3 of either less than three rooms, four rooms, or five or more rooms.

== Medical care ==
Leidschendam-Voorburg counts 34 general practitioners, 26 dentists, 10 pharmacies, and 2 hospitals.

== Education ==
As of 1 October 2003, Leidschendam-Voorburg has 23 primary schools enrolling 6,110 students; 5,112 students were enrolled in high school. There is one special education school with 152 students. There are 50 locations for child care. There are no institutions for higher education within Leidschendam or Voorburg. However, at about 10 miles distance there are both the Delft University of Technology and Leiden University, and a number of applied science and art universities in The Hague (granting bachelor's degrees only), all easily accessible.

== Transportation ==
In 2003, Leidschendam-Voorburg was ranked first among the fifty largest municipalities in The Netherlands in terms of efficiency of transportation (public and private), taking into account geographical location, infrastructural resources, and population density.

Leidschendam is served by highways A4 and A12, which connect to all other areas of the country and international destinations. A number of nearby train stations connect directly to The Hague, Rotterdam and Leiden, with easy access to the rest of the country. Two tram lines connect to local destinations: No. 2 to Kraayenstein in The Hague, and No. 6 to De Uithof in The Hague. There is local and regional bus service. Overall, connectivity is best to downtown The Hague, especially since the beginning of the 21st century when the Noordelijke Randweg was completed, a regional road linking the A4 motorway to parts of The Hague, passing through Leidschendam.

Long-distance travel is convenient from Schiphol airport, within one hour's travel either by car or train.
