= Vliet (canal) =

Canal in South Holland province, Netherlands

Coordinates: 52°5′27″N 4°24′35″E

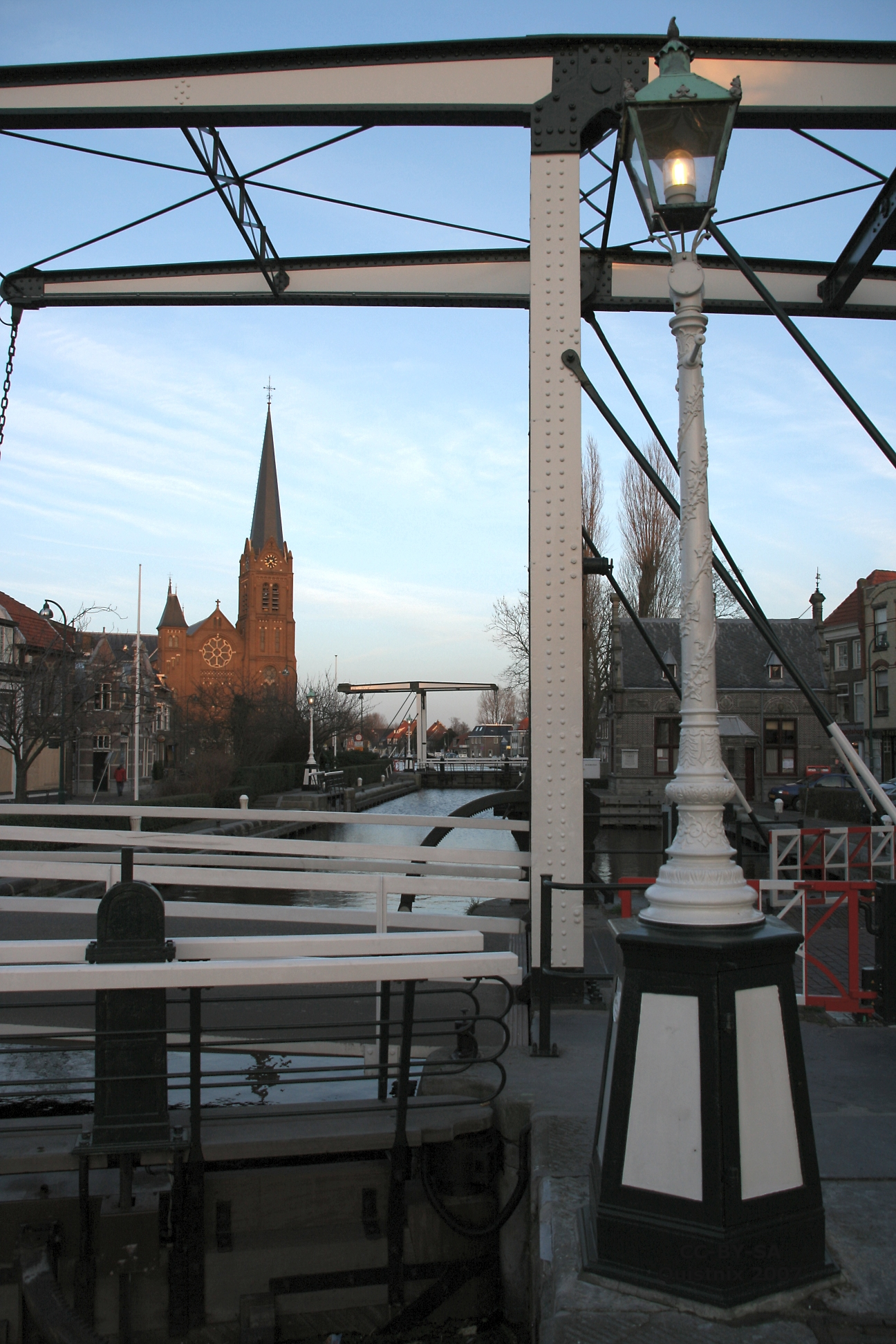
Lock at Leidschendam.

The Vliet (Dutch pronunciation: [vlit]) is a canal in the western Netherlands, in the province of South Holland. It starts at the Oude Rijn at Leiden and joins the Delfshavense Schie canal at Delft. Places along its banks include Voorschoten, Leidschendam, Voorburg, The Hague and Rijswijk.

The canal was dug in 47 AD under command of Roman general Corbulo, who wished to connect the Rhine river, of which the current Oude Rijn stream in Roman times was the main branch, to the Meuse estuary. The capital of the Cananefates (Forum Hadriani, or modern Voorburg) was established along the canal. The canal was likely improved in 121 AD under the reign of Hadrian and it is theorized that to maintain water levels there may have been dams and spillways. Based on discoveries in the new Rietvink quarter of Leidschendam, archaeologists concluded that the ancient canal was about three meters deep and about fifteen meters wide, enough for two ships. It is unclear what the canal's trajectory was beyond the current city of Delft; the Delfshavense Schie canal, which connects Delft to the Nieuwe Maas river was not dug until 1389.

In the Middle Ages the Vliet was an important trade link that attracted much trade, as it flowed through the heart of the County of Holland. Windmills have been constructed alongside the Vliet, including the completely renovated mill 'De salamander' in Leidschendam. The Vliet area was particularly attractive among richer families, who built their mansions along its banks.
