= Edwin Vurens =

Dutch footballer and manager

Personal information
- Full name: Edwin Vurens
- Date of birth: 6 June 1968 (age 58)
- Place of birth: Stompwijk, Netherlands
- Height: 1.88 m (6 ft 2 in)
- Position: Striker

Team information
- Current team: RKSV Docos (manager)

Youth career
- Stompwijkse Boys
- RKAVV

Senior career*
Years	Team	Apps	(Gls)
1987–1992	Sparta Rotterdam	43	(11)
1992–1995	Twente	63	(15)
1995–1996	Roda JC	57	(11)
1996–1998	St. Gallen	56	(15)
1998–2001	Servette	49	(13)
Total		268	(65)

International career
1995	Netherlands	1	(0)

Managerial career
- Sparta Rotterdam (youth)
- 2005–2007: FC Zoetermeer
- 2007–2009: VUC Den Haag
- 2009–?: SV ARC
- BVCB
- SV VELO
- VV Oliveo
- 2022–: RKSV Docos
- * Club domestic league appearances and goals

Edwin Vurens (born 6 June 1968) is a Dutch football manager who coaches Dutch amateur side Docos. Vurens is a former international player who played professionally as a striker for clubs in the Netherlands and Switzerland.

== Football career ==
=== Playing ===
Born in Stompwijk, Vurens played amateur football with Stompwijkse Boys and RKAVV, before signing a professional contract with Sparta Rotterdam. Vurens later played for FC Twente and Roda JC, before playing in Switzerland for FC St. Gallen and Servette FC.

Vurens made one international appearance for the Netherlands national football team in 1995.

=== Coaching ===
After retiring as a player in 2002, Vurens has coached a number of Dutch amateur sides including FC Zoetermeer, VUC Den Haag and BVCB. Since 2022, he manages the Leiden-side RKSV Docos.
