= Voorburg =

Town in South Holland, the Netherlands

- Town
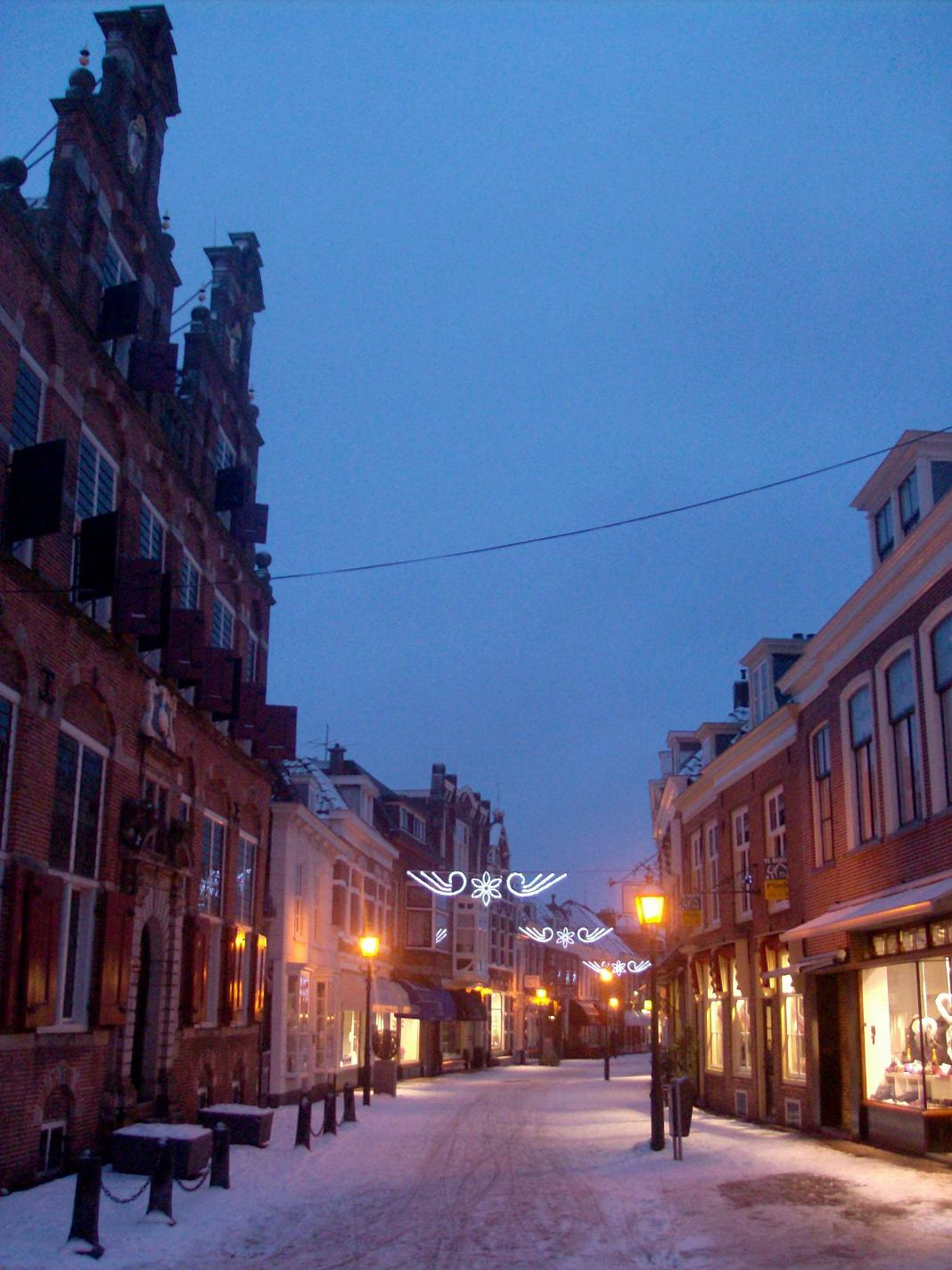
- The Herenstraat in the town centre

- Flag Coat of arms

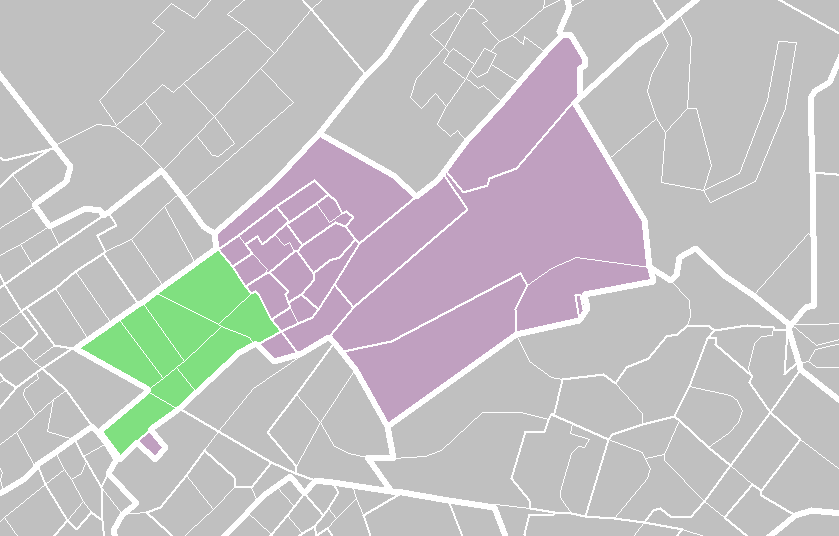
- Location in Leidschendam-Voorburg

- Location of Leidschendam-Voorburg in South Holland
- Coordinates: 52°04′12″N 04°21′18″E
- Country: Netherlands
- Province: South Holland
- Municipality: Leidschendam-Voorburg
- Elevation: 0 m (0 ft)

Population (2023)
  - Total: 21,264
- Source: CBS, Statline.
- Demonym: Voorburger
- Time zone: UTC+1 (CET)
  - Summer (DST): UTC+2 (CEST)
- Area code: 070

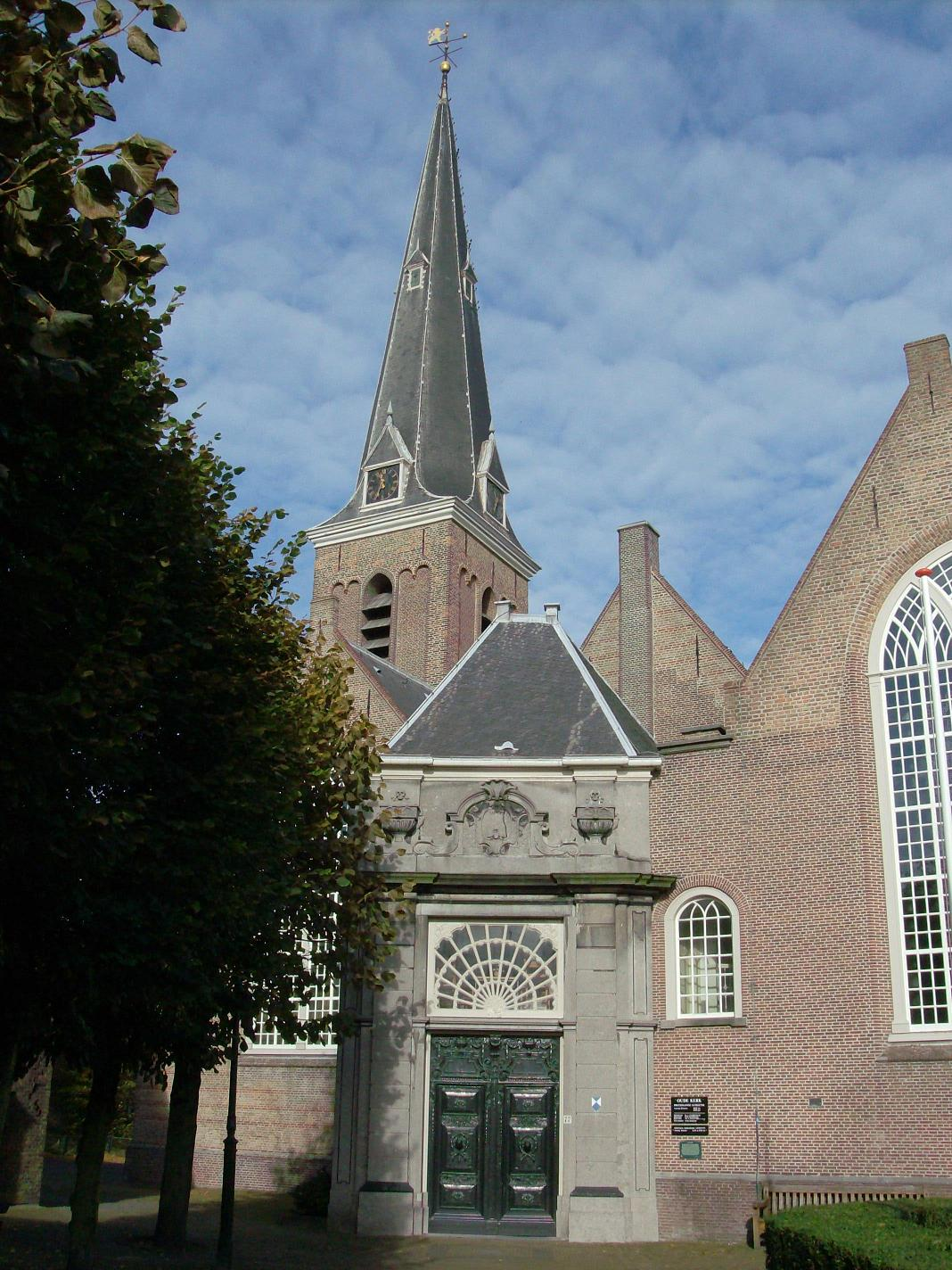
The old church in Voorburg

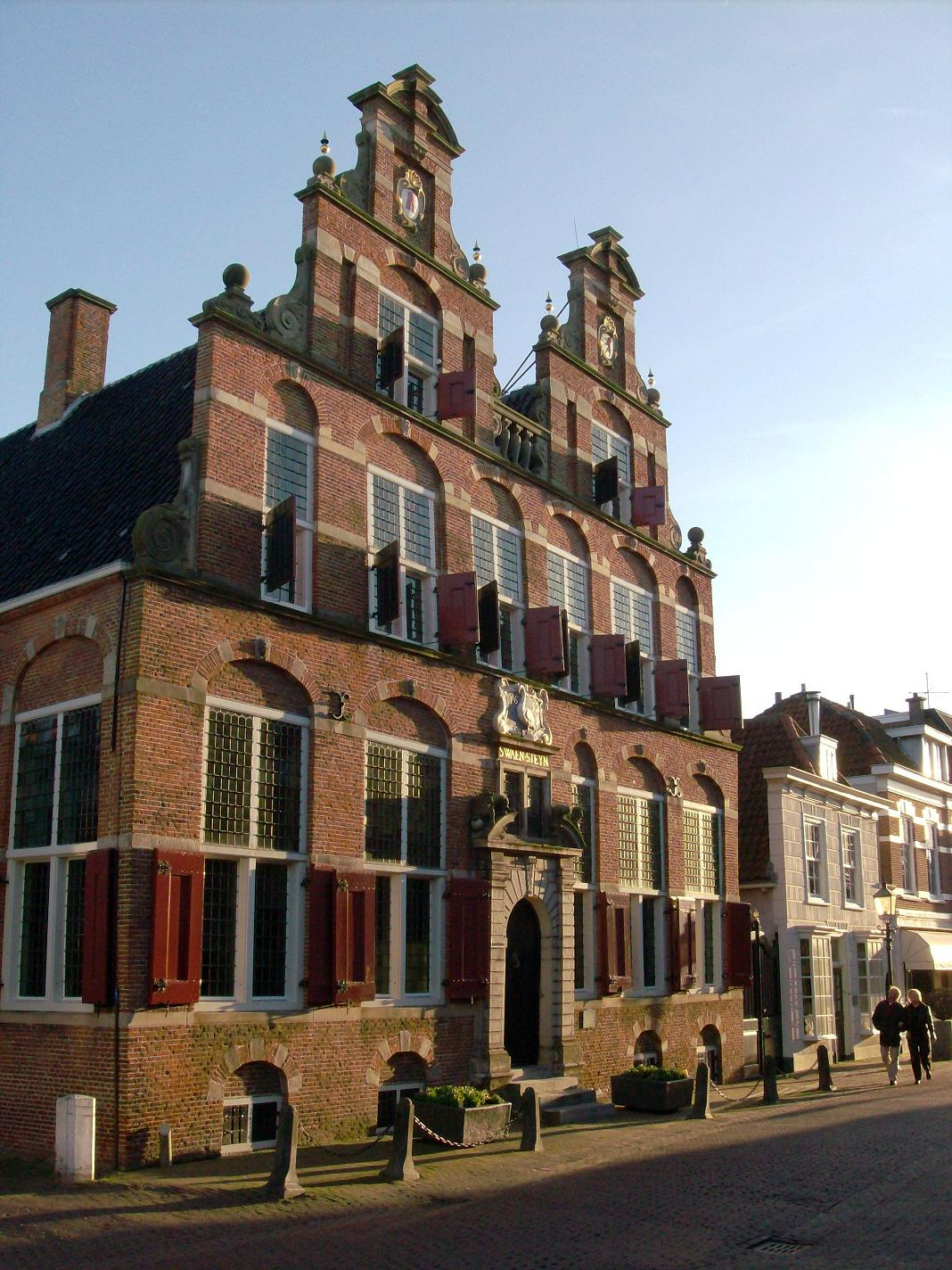
The old Town Hall 'Swaensteyn' from 1632

Voorburg (Dutch pronunciation: [ˈvoːrbʏr(ə)x]) is a town and former municipality in the west part of the province of South Holland, Netherlands. Together with the town Leidschendam and the village Stompwijk, it merged into the municipality of Leidschendam-Voorburg in 2002. Situated adjacent to the city of The Hague, it is often regarded as one of its suburbs.

Voorburg is considered to be one of the oldest towns in the Netherlands (being founded by the Romans as the town Forum Hadriani). It celebrated its 2000th year of existence in 1988.

== History ==
Voorburg was probably inhabited by humans as an urban settlement since about 2700 BC, although not continuously. The Romans arrived here in 47 AD and established a place between 69 and 70 AD, soon after or during the Batavian Revolt. The first clear traces of a civil Roman settlement date from the time of Emperor Domitian under whom the military district along the Rhine was transformed into the Roman province Germania Inferior. It was initially named Municipium Cananefatium, i.e. "Town of the Cananefates", since the site formed the nucleus of the civitas of the Cananefates, who lived west of the Batavians. Voorburg became the capital of the tribal area of the Cananefates. After a supposed visit by Emperor Hadrian in 121/122 AD, the place became known as Forum Hadriani, named after the emperor and which means "Hadrian's Market". Around the middle of the 2nd century, Voorburg received town rights and was given the official name Municipium Aelium Cananefatum. Excavations have shown that Voorburg, despite its small size at the beginning (at most 1,000 inhabitants), was a fully-fledged Roman city. Laid out with a chess-board pattern, the town had bathhouses, shops and a city wall with gates. It was the northernmost Roman town on continental Europe.

Forum Hadriani was situated along the Fossa Corbulonis, a canal connecting the Rhine and the Meuse, excavated in 47 AD by the Roman general Corbulo. This waterway is known as the Rhine-Schie canal. The section from Leiden to Leidschendam-Voorburg is more commonly known as the canal Vliet, which is still a dominant landmark of the current municipalities.

There was a strong population growth in the town and area in the 2nd century, with possibly around 27,000 people at that time living in this area and surroundings. However, from the 3rd century onwards the number of inhabitants fell sharply; this was related to the attacks by Germanic tribes from above the Rhine, but increasing flooding may also have played a role. The Romans left here definitely around 270 AD, due to this continued Germanics attacks. The settlement continued to collapse over time with not many people left during the fall of the Western Roman Empire in the 5th century AD. Only since the 20th century, Voorburg has become a place of considerable size again.

Around the year 600 (just after the Great Migration Period), the Frisian king Ezelsoor (presumambly Audulf) had built a large castle on its remains, which he called Hogeburch. In the ninth century, the whole area was sacked by the Normans with the castle Hogeburch being destroyed. Bishop Hunger of Utrecht, who owned a number of farms at the place, but which had been stolen by the Normans, made a list of all his possessions that he hoped to regain. Here, for the first time the current name Voorburg as Foreburgh appears on this list from 860. 'Foreburgh' is a portmanteau of the words 'Fore' and 'burgh'. 'Fore' probably comes from the earlier Germanic word 'furrha', meaning forest; 'burgh' (also named into English as borough) means fortified settlement. Thus, Voorburg literally means 'fortified settlement in the forest'.

In the ninth century, the Netherlands were governed by a number of counts. In the twelfth century they divided their land into lower administrative divisions, i.e. Amts. During this time Voorburg became a distinctive ambt, with the first Lord of the Amt of Voorburg being Dirk van Duvenvoorde. He was given the position around 1198. There was a small wooden chapel in Voorburg at that time. At the beginning of the thirteenth century this was replaced by the Old Church of Voorburg. In the fifteenth century there were 108 houses in Voorburg. However, most people lived on small farms. Large areas of a wetland existed along the Vliet canal. These wetland accumulated peat, which could be made into a popular fuel at that time. The peat-rich soil led to a strong increase of inhabitants in the area and Voorburg. With trade on the Vliet canal, the area also became a lot busier from the seventeenth century onwards. Due to the new Leidsche dam in the Vliet canal (which would become the town of Leidschendam), trading skippers had to transfer their goods, travellers had to wait for their barge and workmen offered their services there. All those people had to live, eat or sleep somewhere. This also led to an increase in residents in Voorburg.

Although an ancient city, during medieval Holland it was never granted a 'city charter' by its sovereign leader(s) or none available is that old.

Famous inhabitants of Voorburg include the 17th century author and poet Constantijn Huygens, who spent many years building his small country house Hofwijck with adjacent geometrically shaped gardens alongside the Vliet. His son, the famous astronomer and mathematician Christiaan Huygens, spent several years in his father's country house in Voorburg. The house, located next to the main railway station, now functions as a museum.

Philosopher Baruch Spinoza lived in Voorburg from 1663 to 1670. In Voorburg, Spinoza continued work on the Ethics and corresponded with scientists, philosophers, and theologians throughout Europe. He also wrote and published his Theological Political Treatise in 1670, in defense of secular and constitutional government, and in support of Johan de Witt, the Grand Pensionary of the Netherlands, against the Stadtholder, the Prince of Orange. He equated God with Nature.

Until 2009 Voorburg hosted the major branch of the country's statistics institute, the CBS (Central Bureau for Statistics), which provides most of the statistical data used by the government. That year the CBS relocated a few kilometres eastward to Leidschenveen, one of the new developments in the municipality of The Hague.

Until June 2006 the town had three railway stations: Voorburg, Voorburg 't Loo and Leidschendam-Voorburg station. The latter two are now part of the RandstadRail network. Voorburg station used to be an Intercity station, because there was an eternal agreement with the railways that every passing train should stop there. It lost that status, as the new railway station infrastructure is elevated and therefore no longer on the soil of Voorburg.

== Voorburg Cricket Club (VCC) Sportpark Westvliet, The Hague Cricket ground ==
ODI matches began at Sportpark Westvliet during 2010. Bangladesh played one Twenty20 International match each against Scotland and Netherlands there in July 2012.

== Notable people from Voorburg ==
- Hans_Vermeulen, founder of the band Sandy Coast and The Rainbowtrain, music composer/producer, singer
- Johan de Meij, conductor, trombonist, and composer
- Eljero Elia, Dutch footballer
- Marcellus Emants, author
- Guillaume Groen van Prinsterer, politician and historian
- Bart Groothuis, politician
- Ehsan Jami, politician and activist
- Robert Jensen (radio), radio and television presenter
- Jerney Kaagman, singer
- Gerben Karstens, former professional cyclist
- Koos Keijzer, Dutch Champion Race Walking, re-inventor of Electro Culture in Agriculture
- Karen Mulder, former model
- Julian Thomas, singer-songwriter
- Dylan van Baarle, cyclist
- Daan van Bunge, cricketer
- Harry Vanda, member of the Easybeats and Flash and the Pan
- Pieter Winsemius, politician
- Eefje de Visser, singer-songwriter
