= 2026 Belfast Wolves season =

Irish cricket team season

Belfast Wolves
2026 season
- Coach: Kevin O'Brien
- Captain: Glen Maxwell
- Overseas player: (Australia) Glenn Maxwell; (South Africa) David Miller; (New Zealand) Mark Chapman; (New Zealand) Devon Conway; (England) Chris Jordan; (Italy) Harry Manenti; Crishan Kalugamage; Saurabh Netravalkar
- League stage: 3rd
- Qualifier: Won against Amsterdam Flames
- Final: Runners-up
- Most runs: Mark Chapman (283)
- Most wickets: Matthew Humphreys (15)

The 2026 Belfast Wolves season is the inaugural season of the franchise in the European T20 Premier League (ETPL). The team is captained by Glen Maxwell and coached by Kevin O'Brien.

Belfast began their inaugural campaign with a 52-run win over Dublin Guardians a no-result against Rotterdam Dockers due to rain in their second game In a rain-affected game, the Belfast secured a 9-wicket win over Amsterdam Flames in their third game a 59-runs defeat to Edinburgh Castle Rockers a 26-run win over Glasgow Cosmic

The ETPL is heading to Malahide Cricket Ground in Malahide, Ireland and the second half is ready to begin. a 8-wicket defeat to Dublin Guardians a 5-wicket win over Amsterdam Flames a 7-wicket defeat to Rotterdam Dockers a 103-run win over Glasgow Cosmic Belfast completed their league campaign with a 9-run DLS victory over Edinburgh Castle Rockers. After shooting up to a 2nd-place group stage finish heading into the playoffs, in the Qualifier a 7-wicket win over Amsterdam Flames. In the final, Edinburgh Castle Rockers defeated Belfast Wolves by 7 wickets to win the inaugural title.

== Current squad ==
- Players with international caps are listed in **bold**.

Team roster
Name	Nat.	Batting style	Bowling style	Year signed	Notes
Batters
**Tim Tector**	Ireland	Right-handed		2026	
**Mark Chapman**	New Zealand	Left-handed	Slow left-arm orthodox	2026	
**David Miller**	South Africa	Left-handed		2026	
**Paul Stirling**	Ireland	Right-handed	Right-arm off break	2026	
All-rounders
**Glenn Maxwell** (c)	Australia	Right-handed	Right-arm off break	2026	Captain
**Mark Adair**	Ireland	Right-handed	Right-arm fast-medium	2026	
**Harry Manenti**	Italy	Right-handed	Right-arm off break	2026	
**Alexander Roy**	Netherlands	Right-handed		2026	
Wicket-keepers
**Lorcan Tucker** (wk)	Ireland	Left-handed		2026	
**Devon Conway** (wk)	New Zealand	Left-handed		2026	
Bowlers
**Gavin Hoey**	Ireland	Right-handed	Leg break	2026	
**Fred Klaassen**	Netherlands	Left-handed	Left-arm medium-fast	2026	
**Matthew Humphreys**	Ireland	Left-handed	Slow left-arm orthodox	2026	
**Crishan Kalugamage**	Italy	Right-handed	Right-arm medium-fast	2026	
**Saurabh Netravalkar**	United States	Left-handed	Left-arm medium-fast	2026	
**Chris Jordan**	England	Right-handed	Right-arm fast	2026	
**Zainullah Ihsan**	Scotland	Right-handed	Right-arm medium	2026	

== League stage ==
The fixtures for the inaugural season were announced on 28 July 2026 and are split in two legs: the first 17 matches will be played at Sportpark Westvliet in Voorburg, Netherlands, and the second 13 matches at the Malahide Cricket Ground in Malahide, Ireland.

=== Round 1 (Voorburg) ===
Match 2
27 August 2026
11:30
Scorecard

Belfast Wolves (H); 184/7 (20 overs)	v	Dublin Guardians; 132/9 (20 overs)
Glenn Maxwell 60 (38); Chris Wood 3/43 (4 overs)		George Dockrell 35 (22); Matthew Humphreys 2/23 (4 overs)

Belfast Wolves won by 52 runs
Sportpark Westvliet, Voorburg
Umpires: Nitin Bathi (Ned) and David McLean (Sco)
Player of the match: Glenn Maxwell (Belfast Wolves)

- Dublin Guardians won the toss and elected to field.

Match 6
29 August 2026
15:15
Scorecard

Belfast Wolves; 156/9 (20 overs)	v	Rotterdam Dockers (H); 5/0 (1 over)
Devon Conway 41 (29); Anrich Nortje 5/11 (4 overs)		Faf du Plessis 4* (3)

No result
Sportpark Westvliet, Voorburg
Umpires: Rizwan Akram (Ned) and Chris Brown (NZ)

- Belfast Wolves won the toss and elected to bat.
- Rotterdam Dockers were set a revised target of 121 runs in 14 overs due to rain.
- No further play was possible due to rain.
- Anrich Nortje (Rotterdam Dockers) took his maiden five-wicket haul in T20s.

Match 7
30 August 2026
11:30
Scorecard

Amsterdam Flames (H); 56/2 (5 overs)	v	Belfast Wolves; 59/1 (3.5 overs)
Steve Smith 20 (10); Chris Jordan 1/18 (2 overs)		Paul Stirling 25* (10); Aryan Dutt 1/8 (1 overs)

Belfast Wolves won by 9 wickets
Sportpark Westvliet, Voorburg
Umpires: Roland Black (Ire) and Chris Brown (NZ)
Player of the match: Paul Stirling (Belfast Wolves)

- Belfast Wolves won the toss and elected to field.
- The match was reduced to 5 overs per side due to rain.
- David Rushmere (Amsterdam Flames) made his T20 debut.

Match 11
2 September 2026
15:15
Scorecard

Edinburgh Castle Rockers; 189/5 (20 overs)	v	Belfast Wolves (H); 130 (17.1 overs)
JJ Smuts 98 (60); Fred Klaassen 2/22 (4 overs)		Glenn Maxwell 35 (23); Tom Curran 4/20 (3.1 overs)

Edinburgh Castle Rockers won by 59 runs
Sportpark Westvliet, Voorburg
Umpires: Roland Black (Ire) and Ryan Milne (Sco)
Player of the match: JJ Smuts (Edinburgh Castle Rockers)

- Belfast Wolves won the toss and elected to field.

Match 13
4 September 2026
15:15
Scorecard

Belfast Wolves; 146/3 (12 overs)	v	Glasgow Cosmic (H); 120/8 (12 overs)
Mark Chapman 71* (33); Lungi Ngidi 1/31 (3 overs)		Jason Roy 54 (28); Fred Klaassen 3/21 (3 overs)

Belfast Wolves won by 26 runs
Sportpark Westvliet, Voorburg
Umpires: Chris Brown (NZ) and Ryan Milne (Sco)
Player of the match: Mark Chapman (Belfast Wolves)

- Glasgow Cosmic won the toss and elected to field.
- The match was reduced to 12 overs per side due to rain.

Match 18
9 September 2026
14:15
Scorecard

Belfast Wolves; 107 (19.4 overs)	v	Dublin Guardians (H); 111/2 (14.3 overs)
Harry Manenti 24 (21); Craig Young 5/21 (4 overs)		David Willey 44 (25); Glenn Maxwell 1/2 (1 over)

Dublin Guardians won by 8 wickets
Malahide Cricket Ground, Malahide
Umpires: Gareth Morrison (Ire) and Chris Brown (NZ)
Player of the match: Craig Young (Dublin Guardians)

- Dublin Guardians won the toss and elected to field.

=== Round 2 (Malahide) ===
Match 20
10 September 2026
14:15
Scorecard

Amsterdam Flames; 141 (20 overs)	v	Belfast Wolves (H); 144/5 (19 overs)
Bas de Leede 39 (20); Mark Adair 3/25 (4 overs)		David Miller 42* (26); Michael Bracewell 2/20 (3 overs)

Belfast Wolves won by 5 wickets
Malahide Cricket Ground, Malahide
Umpires: Jonathan Kennedy (Ire) and Chris Brown (NZ)
Player of the match: Mark Adair (Belfast Wolves)

- Belfast Wolves won the toss and elected to field.

Match 22
12 September 2026
10:30
Scorecard

Belfast Wolves (H); 161/6 (20 overs)	v	Rotterdam Dockers; 162/3 (18 overs)
Lorcan Tucker 58 (42); Anrich Nortje 2/37 (4 overs)		Heinrich Klaasen 47* (26); Harry Manenti 1/12 (2 overs)

Rotterdam Dockers won by 7 wickets
Malahide Cricket Ground, Malahide
Umpires: Roland Black (Ire) and Gareth Morrison (Ire)
Player of the match: Heinrich Klaasen (Rotterdam Dockers)

- Rotterdam Dockers won the toss and elected to field.

Match 25
13 September 2026
14:15
Scorecard

Belfast Wolves (H); 187/8 (20 overs)	v	Glasgow Cosmic; 84 (14.5 overs)
Mark Chapman 54 (25); Liam Livingstone 3/27 (4 overs)		Moises Henriques 31 (25); Matthew Humphreys 4/19 (4 overs)

Belfast Wolves won by 103 runs
Malahide Cricket Ground, Malahide
Umpires: Gareth Morrison (Ire) and Roland Black (Ire)
Player of the match: Matthew Humphreys (Belfast Wolves)

- Glasgow Cosmic won the toss and elected to field.

Match 29
17 September 2026
10:30
Scorecard

Belfast Wolves; 190/4 (20 overs)	v	Edinburgh Castle Rockers (H); 137/6 (15 overs)
Glenn Maxwell 82* (40); Tom Curran 2/43 (4 overs)		Andries Gous 34 (29); Matthew Humphreys 2/9 (3 overs)

Belfast Wolves won by 9 runs (DLS method)
Malahide Cricket Ground, Malahide
Umpires: Aidan Seaver (Ire) and Nitin Bathi (Ned)
Player of the match: Glenn Maxwell (Belfast Wolves)

- Edinburgh Castle Rockers won the toss and elected to field.
- Edinburgh Castle Rockers were set a revised target of 147 runs in 15 overs due to rain.

== Standing ==
=== Points table ===
Pos	Team	Pld	W	L	NR	Pts	NRR	Qualification
1	Edinburgh Castle Rockers (C)	10	6	3	1	13	1.208	Advanced to the Final
2	Amsterdam Flames	10	6	3	1	13	1.037	Advanced to the Qualifier
3	Belfast Wolves (R)	10	6	3	1	13	0.602	Advanced to the Qualifier
4	Rotterdam Dockers	10	6	3	1	13	−0.024	Eliminated
5	Dublin Guardians	10	2	8	0	4	−0.943	Eliminated
6	Glasgow Cosmic	10	2	8	0	4	−1.450	Eliminated

Source: Cricinfo
(C) Champions; (R) Runners-up

=== Match summary ===
Team	League matches										Finals	
Team	1	2	3	4	5	6	7	8	9	10	QF	F
Belfast Wolves	2	3	5	5	7	7	9	9	11	13	W	L

Win	Loss	Tie	No result

== Playoffs ==
=== Bracket ===
Qualifier			Final
			QW	Belfast Wolves	150/5 (20 overs)
2	Amsterdam Flames	133 (20 overs)	1	Edinburgh Castle Rockers	151/3 (18.4 overs)
3	Belfast Wolves	136/3 (18.3 overs)

=== Qualifier ===
Qualifier
19 September 2026
14:15
Scorecard

Amsterdam Flames; 133 (20 overs)	v	Belfast Wolves; 136/3 (18.3 overs)
Steve Smith 45 (42); Glenn Maxwell 4/18 (4 overs)		Devon Conway 35 (41); Michael Bracewell 2/20 (4 overs)

Belfast Wolves won by 7 wickets
Malahide Cricket Ground, Malahide
Umpires: Aidan Seaver (Ire) and Jonathan Kennedy (Ire)
Player of the match: Glenn Maxwell (Belfast Wolves)

- Belfast Wolves won the toss and elected to field.

== Final ==
Final
20 September 2026
14:15
- Scorecard

Belfast Wolves; 150/5 (20 overs)	v	Edinburgh Castle Rockers; 151/3 (18.4 overs)
Tim Tector 84 (62); Trent Boult 2/21 (4 overs)		Andries Gous 90 (61); Matthew Humphreys 1/29 (4 overs)

Edinburgh Castle Rockers won by 7 wickets
Malahide Cricket Ground, Malahide
Umpires: Roland Black (Ire) and Gareth Morrison (Ire)
Player of the match: Andries Gous (Edinburgh Castle Rockers)

- Edinburgh Castle Rockers won the toss and elected to field.

== Administration and support staff ==
Position	Name
Owner & captain	Glenn Maxwell
Co-owner	Rohan Lund
Head coach	Kevin O'Brien
