= 2026 Amsterdam Flames season =

Dutch cricket team season

Amsterdam Flames
2026 season
- Coach: Ryan Cook
- Captain: ~~Mitchell Marsh~~; Scott Edwards
- Overseas player: Steve Smith; Tim David; Michael Bracewell; David Payne; Richard Gleeson; Ajinkya Rahane; Dipendra Singh Airee; Yuvraj Samra
- Ground(s): Sportpark Westvliet in Voorburg
- League stage: 2nd
- Playoffs: Qualifier (3rd)
- Most runs: Bas de Leede (320)
- Most wickets: Michael Bracewell (19)

The 2026 Amsterdam Flames season is the first season of the franchise in the European T20 Premier League (ETPL). The team is captained by Scott Edwards and coached by Ryan Cook.

Amsterdam began their inaugural ETPL campaign with a 5-wicket defeat to Rotterdam Dockers a no-result against Edinburgh Castle Rockers due to rain in their second game In a rain-affected game, a heavy 9-wicket defeat to Belfast Wolves in their third game a convincing 7-wicket victory over Glasgow Cosmic a 9-run win over Dublin Guardians a 8-wicket win over Rotterdam Dockers

The ETPL is heading to Malahide Cricket Ground in Malahide, Ireland and the second half is ready to begin. a 5-wicket defeat to Belfast Wolves a 8-wicket win over Edinburgh Castle Rockers a 59-runs win over Dublin Guardians Amsterdam completed their league campaign with a 5-wicket victory over Glasgow Cosmic. After shooting up to a 2nd-place group stage finish heading into the playoffs, in the Qualifier a 7-wicket defeat to Belfast Wolves. Amsterdam campaign ends in the qualifier.

== Current squad ==
- Players with international caps are listed in **bold**.

Amsterdam Flames 2026
Name	Nat.	Batting style	Bowling style	Year signed	Notes
Batters
**Steve Smith**	Australia	Right-handed	Right-arm leg spin	2026	
**Tim David**	Australia	Right-handed	Right-arm off break	2026	
**Max O'Dowd**	Netherlands	Right-handed		2026	
**Yuvraj Samra**	Canada	Right-handed			
All-rounders
**Mitchell Marsh** (c)	Australia	Right-handed	Right-arm medium-fast	2026	
**Michael Bracewell**	New Zealand	Left-handed	Right-arm off break		
**Curtis Campher**	Ireland	Right-handed	Right-arm medium		
**Dipendra Singh Airee**	Nepal	Right-handed	Right-arm off break		
**Bas de Leede**	Netherlands	Right-handed	Right-arm medium-fast		
**Aryan Dutt**	Netherlands	Right-handed	Right-arm off break		
**Tim Pringle**	Netherlands	Left-handed	Slow left-arm orthodox		
Wicket-keeper
**Scott Edwards** (wk)	Netherlands	Right-handed			
Bowlers
**Richard Gleeson**	England	Right-handed	Right-arm fast		
**Ali Hassan**	Italy	Right-handed	Right-arm fast-medium		
**Kyle Klein**	Netherlands	Right-handed	Right-arm fast-medium		
**Jordan Neill**	Ireland	Right-handed	Right-arm medium-fast		
**David Payne**	England	Left-handed	Left-arm fast-medium		

== League stage ==
The fixtures for the inaugural season were announced on 28 July 2026 and are split in two legs: the first 17 matches will be played at Sportpark Westvliet in Voorburg, Netherlands, and the second 13 matches at the Malahide Cricket Ground in Malahide, Ireland.

=== Round 1 (Voorburg) ===
Match 1
26 August 2026
15:15
Scorecard

Amsterdam Flames; 157/8 (20 overs)	v	Rotterdam Dockers (H); 158/5 (18.1 overs)
Bas de Leede 75 (53); Roelof van der Merwe 2/21 (4 overs)		Faf du Plessis 83 (55); Kyle Klein 3/34 (4 overs)

Rotterdam Dockers won by 5 wickets
Sportpark Westvliet, Voorburg
Umpires: Nitin Bathi (Ned) and Chris Brown (NZ)
Player of the match: Faf du Plessis (Rotterdam Dockers)

- Rotterdam Dockers won the toss and elected to field.

Match 4
28 August 2026
15:15
Scorecard

Amsterdam Flames (H)	v	Edinburgh Castle Rockers

No result
Sportpark Westvliet, Voorburg
Umpires: Rizwan Akram (Ned) and Chris Brown (NZ)

- Edinburgh Castle Rockers won the toss and elected to field.
- No play was possible due to rain.

Match 7
30 August 2026
11:30
Scorecard

Amsterdam Flames (H); 56/2 (5 overs)	v	Belfast Wolves; 59/1 (3.5 overs)
Steve Smith 20 (10); Chris Jordan 1/18 (2 overs)		Paul Stirling 25* (10); Aryan Dutt 1/8 (1 overs)

Belfast Wolves won by 9 wickets
Sportpark Westvliet, Voorburg
Umpires: Roland Black (Ire) and Chris Brown (NZ)
Player of the match: Paul Stirling (Belfast Wolves)

- Belfast Wolves won the toss and elected to field.
- The match was reduced to 5 overs per side due to rain.
- David Rushmere (Amsterdam Flames) made his T20 debut.

Match 12
3 September 2026
15:15
Scorecard

Glasgow Cosmic; 171/8 (20 overs)	v	Amsterdam Flames (H); 177/3 (16.5 overs)
George Munsey 67 (49); Tim Pringle 2/23 (4 overs)		Yuvraj Samra 73 (32); Keshav Maharaj 1/34 (4 overs)

Amsterdam Flames won by 7 wickets
Sportpark Westvliet, Voorburg
Umpires: Chris Brown (NZ) and Roland Black (Ire)
Player of the match: Yuvraj Samra (Amsterdam Flames)

- Glasgow Cosmic won the toss and elected to bat.

Match 15
5 September 2026
15:15
Scorecard

Amsterdam Flames; 169/7 (20 overs)	v	Dublin Guardians (H); 160/8 (20 overs)
Steve Smith 38 (27); George Dockrell 2/31 (4 overs)		James Vince 73 (46); Tim Pringle 3/22 (4 overs)

Amsterdam Flames won by 9 runs
Sportpark Westvliet, Voorburg
Umpires: David McLean (Sco) and Rizwan Akram (Ned)
Player of the match: Tim Pringle (Amsterdam Flames)

- Dublin Guardians won the toss and elected to field.

Match 17
6 September 2026
15:15
Scorecard

Rotterdam Dockers; 176/6 (20 overs)	v	Amsterdam Flames (H); 178/2 (17.4 overs)
Faf du Plessis 60 (47); Michael Bracewell 3/30 (4 overs)		Bas de Leede 69* (50); Ben Manenti 1/13 (1 over)

Amsterdam Flames won by 8 wickets
Sportpark Westvliet, Voorburg
Umpires: Rizwan Akram (Ned) and Ryan Milne (Sco)
Player of the match: Bas de Leede (Amsterdam Flames)

- Amsterdam Flames won the toss and elected to field.

=== Round 2 (Malahide) ===
Match 20
10 September 2026
14:15
Scorecard

Amsterdam Flames; 141 (20 overs)	v	Belfast Wolves (H); 144/5 (19 overs)
Bas de Leede 39 (20); Mark Adair 3/25 (4 overs)		David Miller 42* (26); Michael Bracewell 2/20 (3 overs)

Belfast Wolves won by 5 wickets
Malahide Cricket Ground, Malahide
Umpires: Jonathan Kennedy (Ire) and Chris Brown (NZ)
Player of the match: Mark Adair (Belfast Wolves)

- Belfast Wolves won the toss and elected to field.

Match 24
13 September 2026
10:30
Scorecard

Edinburgh Castle Rockers (H); 118 (18.3 overs)	v	Amsterdam Flames; 120/2 (14.5 overs)
Ross Adair 32 (16); Michael Bracewell 5/12 (4 overs)		Yuvraj Samra 40 (26); Mitchell Santner 1/31 (4)

Amsterdam Flames won by 8 wickets
Malahide Cricket Ground, Malahide
Umpires: Jonathan Kennedy (Ire) and Aidan Seaver (Ire)
Player of the match: Michael Bracewell (Amsterdam Flames)

- Amsterdam Flames won the toss and elected to field.
- Michael Bracewell (Amsterdam Flames) took his maiden five-wicket haul in T20s.

Match 26
15 September 2026
10:30
Scorecard

Amsterdam Flames (H); 214/5 (20 overs)	v	Dublin Guardians; 155/9 (20 overs)
Curtis Campher 66 (31); Craig Young 3/50 (4)		Daryl Mitchell 33 (33); Michael Bracewell 3/14 (4 overs)

Amsterdam Flames won by 59 runs
Malahide Cricket Ground, Malahide
Umpires: Gareth Morrison (Ire) and Aidan Seaver (Ire)
Player of the match: Curtis Campher (Amsterdam Flames)

- Dublin Guardians won the toss and elected to field.

Match 28
16 September 2026
14:15
Scorecard

Glasgow Cosmic (H); 126 (19.5 overs)	v	Amsterdam Flames; 127/5 (16 overs)
George Munsey 51 (45); Bas de Leede 4/6 (1.5 overs)		Curtis Campher 44 (30); Tymal Mills 2/32 (4 overs)

Amsterdam Flames won by 5 wickets
Malahide Cricket Ground, Malahide
Umpires: Roland Black (Ire) and Gareth Morrison (Ire)
Player of the match: David Payne (Amsterdam Flames)

- Amsterdam Flames won the toss and elected to field.

== Standing ==
=== Points table ===
Pos	Team	Pld	W	L	NR	Pts	NRR	Qualification
1	Edinburgh Castle Rockers	10	6	3	1	13	1.208	Advanced to the Final
2	Amsterdam Flames	10	6	3	1	13	1.037	Advanced to the Qualifier
3	Belfast Wolves	10	6	3	1	13	0.602	Advanced to the Qualifier
4	Rotterdam Dockers	10	6	3	1	13	−0.024	Eliminated
5	Dublin Guardians	10	2	8	0	4	−0.943	Eliminated
6	Glasgow Cosmic	10	2	8	0	4	−1.450	Eliminated

Source: Cricinfo

=== Match summary ===
Team	League matches										Finals	
Team	1	2	3	4	5	6	7	8	9	10	QF	F
Amsterdam Flames	0	1	1	3	5	7	7	9	11	13	L	

Win	Loss	Tie	No result

== Playoffs ==
=== Bracket ===
Qualifier			Final
			1	Edinburgh Castle Rockers
2	Amsterdam Flames	133 (20 overs)	QW	Belfast Wolves
3	Belfast Wolves	136/3 (18.3 overs)

=== Qualifier ===
Qualifier
19 September 2026
14:15
Scorecard

Amsterdam Flames; 133 (20 overs)	v	Belfast Wolves; 136/3 (18.3 overs)
Steve Smith 45 (42); Glenn Maxwell 4/18 (4 overs)		Devon Conway 35 (41); Michael Bracewell 2/20 (4 overs)

Belfast Wolves won by 7 wickets
Malahide Cricket Ground, Malahide
Umpires: Aidan Seaver (Ire) and Jonathan Kennedy (Ire)
Player of the match: Glenn Maxwell (Belfast Wolves)

- Belfast Wolves won the toss and elected to field.

== Administration and support staff ==
Amestrdam Flames staff
Position	Name
Head coach	Ryan Cook
Assistant Coach	JP Duminy
Assistant Coach	John Davison
Co-owner & chief cricket officer	Steve Waugh
Co-owner	Jamie Dwyer
Co-owner	Tim Thomas

- Source :Support staff
