= 2026 Edinburgh Castle Rockers season =

Scottish cricket team season

Edinburgh Castle Rockers
2026 season
- Coach: Trevor Bayliss
- Captain: Mitchell Santner
- Overseas player: (New Zealand) Mitchell Santner; (New Zealand) Trent Boult; (England) Tom Curran; (South Africa) JJ Smuts; (United States) Andries Gous; (Australia) Andrew Tye; (England) Laurie Evans; (Samoa) Sean Solia
- League stage: 1st
- ETPL finals: Champions
- Most runs: Brandon McMullen (356)
- Most wickets: Tom Curran (17)

The 2026 Edinburgh Castle Rockers season is the first season of the franchise in the European T20 Premier League (ETPL). The team is captained by Mitchell Santner and coached by Trevor Bayliss.

Edinburgh began their inaugural campaign with a 7-wicket win over Glasgow Cosmic a no-result against Amsterdam Flames due to rain in their second game a 4-wicket win over Dublin Guardians a 59-runs win over Belfast Wolves – courtesy of JJ Smuts’s mammoth 98 and Tom Curran’s historic hat-trick a 55-runs win over Rotterdam Dockers a 7-wicket victory over Glasgow Cosmic

The ETPL is heading to Malahide Cricket Ground in Malahide, Ireland and the second half is ready to begin. Edinburgh continued their unbeaten run in the ETPL with a hard-fought 12-run victory over Dublin Guardians a 8-wicket defeat to Amsterdam Flames – ended Edinburgh’s incredible unbeaten streak. a 5-runs defeat to Rotterdam Dockers Edinburgh completed their league campaign with a 9-run DLS defeat to Belfast Wolves. Edinburgh advance directly to the final. In the final, Edinburgh Castle Rockers defeated Belfast Wolves by 7 wickets to win the inaugural title.

== Background ==
The 2026 season was the inaugural season of the Edinburgh Castle Rockers in the European T20 Premier League. The franchise represents Edinburgh, Scotland, The team is owned by former New Zealand international cricketers Nathan McCullum and Kyle Mills.

The Castle Rockers quickly assembled a strong squad ahead of the inaugural 2026 season, appointing New Zealand international Mitchell Santner as captain and signing experienced fast bowler Trent Boult and English all-rounder Tom Curran. South African all-rounder JJ Smuts, American wicketkeeper-batter Andries Gous, Australian fast bowler Andrew Tye, English batter Laurie Evans, and Samoan all-rounder Sean Solia were also brought in. Scottish internationals Brandon McMullen, Mark Watt, Safyaan Sharif, Finlay McCreath and Jack Jarvis formed the core of the domestic contingent, alongside Irish internationals Ross Adair and Gareth Delany. American fast bowler Rushil Ugarkar and Scottish all-rounder Ollie Jones completed the squad.

Ahead of the inaugural season opener, the team announced it would be led by New Zealand skipper Mitchell Santner and coached by Trevor Bayliss.

== Current squad ==
- Players with international caps are listed in **bold**.

Edinburgh Castle Rockers 2026
No.	Name	Nationality	Birth date	Batting style	Bowling style	Notes
Batsmen
—	**Ross Adair**	Ireland	21 April 1994 (age 32)	Right-handed	Slow left-arm orthodox	
—	Laurie Evans	England	12 October 1987 (age 38)	Right-handed	Right-arm off break	
—	**Finlay McCreath**	Scotland	16 October 1998 (age 27)	Right-handed	—	
All-rounders
—	**Gareth Delany**	Ireland	28 April 1997 (age 29)	Right-handed	Leg break googly	
—	**Brandon McMullen**	Scotland	18 October 1999 (age 26)	Right-handed	Right-arm medium	
—	**JJ Smuts**	Italy	21 September 1988 (age 38)	Right-handed	Slow left-arm orthodox	
—	**Sean Solia**	Samoa	12 February 1995 (age 31)	Left-handed	Right-arm medium-fast	
—	**Tom Curran**	England	12 March 1995 (age 31)	Right-handed	Right-arm fast-medium	
—	**Mitchell Santner**	New Zealand	5 February 1992 (age 34)	Left-handed	Slow left-arm orthodox	Captain
Wicket-keepers
—	**Andries Gous**	United States	24 November 1993 (age 32)	Right-handed	—	Wicket-keeper
Bowlers
—	**Andrew Tye**	Australia	12 December 1986 (age 39)	Right-handed	Right-arm fast	
—	**Trent Boult**	New Zealand	22 July 1989 (age 37)	Right-handed	Left-arm fast-medium	
—	**Mark Watt**	Scotland	29 July 1996 (age 30)	Left-handed	Slow left-arm orthodox	
—	**Safyaan Sharif**	Scotland	24 August 1991 (age 35)	Right-handed	Right-arm medium-fast	
—	**Jack Jarvis**	Scotland	31 July 2000 (age 26)	Right-handed	Right-arm medium-fast	
—	**Rushil Ugarkar**	United States	30 June 2003 (age 23)	Right-handed	Right-arm fast-medium	
—	**Ollie Jones**	Scotland	4 June 2001 (age 25)	Right-handed	Right-arm medium-fast	

== League stage ==
The fixtures for the inaugural season were announced on 28 July 2026 and are split in two legs: the first 17 matches will be played at Sportpark Westvliet in Voorburg, Netherlands, and the second 13 matches at the Malahide Cricket Ground in Malahide, Ireland.

=== Round 1 (Voorburg) ===
Match 3
27 August 2026
15:15
Scorecard

Glasgow Cosmic; 115 (20 overs)	v	Edinburgh Castle Rockers (H); 116/3 (11.3 overs)
Keshav Maharaj 29* (27); Trent Boult 5/24 (4 overs)		Andries Gous 40* (28); Lungi Ngidi 1/13 (2 overs)

Edinburgh Castle Rockers won by 7 wickets
Sportpark Westvliet, Voorburg
Umpires: Rizwan Akram (Ned) and Chris Brown (NZ)
Player of the match: Trent Boult (Edinburgh Castle Rockers)

- Edinburgh Castle Rockers won the toss and elected to field.
- Trent Boult (Edinburgh Castle Rockers) took his maiden five-wicket haul in T20s.

Match 4
28 August 2026
15:15
Scorecard

Amsterdam Flames (H)	v	Edinburgh Castle Rockers

No result
Sportpark Westvliet, Voorburg
Umpires: Rizwan Akram (Ned) and Chris Brown (NZ)

- Edinburgh Castle Rockers won the toss and elected to field.
- No play was possible due to rain.

Match 8
30 August 2026
15:15
Scorecard

Dublin Guardians; 109 (18 overs)	v	Edinburgh Castle Rockers (H); 110/6 (13.4 overs)
James Vince 40 (30); Mitchell Santner 5/16 (4 overs)		JJ Smuts 33 (24); George Dockrell 3/27 (4 overs)

Edinburgh Castle Rockers won by 4 wickets
Sportpark Westvliet, Voorburg
Umpires: Nitin Bathi (Ned) and David McLean (Sco)
Player of the match: Mitchell Santner (Edinburgh Castle Rockers)

- Dublin Guardians won the toss and elected to bat.
- Mitchell Santner (Edinburgh Castle Rockers) took his maiden five-wicket haul in T20s.

Match 11
2 September 2026
15:15
Scorecard

Edinburgh Castle Rockers; 189/5 (20 overs)	v	Belfast Wolves (H); 130 (17.1 overs)
JJ Smuts 98 (60); Fred Klaassen 2/22 (4 overs)		Glenn Maxwell 35 (23); Tom Curran 4/20 (3.1 overs)

Edinburgh Castle Rockers won by 59 runs
Sportpark Westvliet, Voorburg
Umpires: Roland Black (Ire) and Ryan Milne (Sco)
Player of the match: JJ Smuts (Edinburgh Castle Rockers)

- Belfast Wolves won the toss and elected to field.

Match 14
5 September 2026
11:30
Scorecard

Edinburgh Castle Rockers; 148 (19.3 overs)	v	Rotterdam Dockers (H); 93 (18 overs)
Brandon McMullen 37 (28); David Wiese 3/18 (3.3 overs)		Faf du Plessis 21 (19); Tom Curran 3/16 (4 overs)

Edinburgh Castle Rockers won by 55 runs
Sportpark Westvliet, Voorburg
Umpires: Nitin Bathi (Ned) and Roland Black (Ire)
Player of the match: Gareth Delany (Edinburgh Castle Rockers)

- Rotterdam Dockers won the toss and elected to field.

Match 16
6 September 2026
11:30
Scorecard

Glasgow Cosmic (H); 159/6 (20 overs)	v	Edinburgh Castle Rockers; 163/3 (19 overs)
Richie Berrington 38 (20); Tom Curran 2/29 (4 overs)		Brandon McMullen 82* (47); Oliver Davidson 2/31 (4 overs)

Edinburgh Castle Rockers won by 7 wickets
Sportpark Westvliet, Voorburg
Umpires: Chris Brown (NZ) and David McLean (Sco)
Player of the match: Brandon McMullen (Edinburgh Castle Rockers)

- Edinburgh Castle Rockers won the toss and elected to field.

=== Round 2 (Malahide) ===
Match 21
11 September 2026
14:15
Scorecard

Edinburgh Castle Rockers; 174/4 (20 overs)	v	Dublin Guardians (H); 162/8 (20 overs)
Brandon McMullen 69* (49); Craig Young 3/42 (4 overs)		Harry Tector 45 (29); Jack Jarvis 4/34 (4 overs)

Edinburgh Castle Rockers won by 12 runs
Malahide Cricket Ground, Malahide
Umpires: Chris Brown (NZ) and Aidan Seaver (Ire)
Player of the match: Brandon McMullen (Edinburgh Castle Rockers)

- Dublin Guardians won the toss and elected to field.

Match 24
13 September 2026
10:30
Scorecard

Edinburgh Castle Rockers (H); 118 (18.3 overs)	v	Amsterdam Flames; 120/2 (14.5 overs)
Ross Adair 32 (16); Michael Bracewell 5/12 (4 overs)		Yuvraj Samra 40 (26); Mitchell Santner 1/31 (4)

Amsterdam Flames won by 8 wickets
Malahide Cricket Ground, Malahide
Umpires: Jonathan Kennedy (Ire) and Aidan Seaver (Ire)
Player of the match: Michael Bracewell (Amsterdam Flames)

- Amsterdam Flames won the toss and elected to field.
- Michael Bracewell (Amsterdam Flames) took his maiden five-wicket haul in T20s.

Match 27
15 September 2026
14:15
Scorecard

Rotterdam Dockers; 181/6 (20 overs)	v	Edinburgh Castle Rockers (H); 176/5 (20 overs)
Faf du Plessis 54 (35); Reece Topley 2/36 (4 overs)		Brandon McMullen 47 (30); Shubham Ranjane 3/22 (4 overs)

Rotterdam Dockers won by 5 runs
Malahide Cricket Ground, Malahide
Umpires: Rizwan Akram (Ned) and Jonathan Kennedy (Ire)
Player of the match: Shubham Ranjane (Rotterdam Dockers)

- Rotterdam Dockers won the toss and elected to bat.

Match 29
17 September 2026
10:30
Scorecard

Belfast Wolves; 190/4 (20 overs)	v	Edinburgh Castle Rockers (H); 137/6 (15 overs)
Glenn Maxwell 82* (40); Tom Curran 2/43 (4 overs)		Andries Gous 34 (29); Matthew Humphreys 2/9 (3 overs)

Belfast Wolves won by 9 runs (DLS method)
Malahide Cricket Ground, Malahide
Umpires: Aidan Seaver (Ire) and Nitin Bathi (Ned)
Player of the match: Glenn Maxwell (Belfast Wolves)

- Edinburgh Castle Rockers won the toss and elected to field.
- Edinburgh Castle Rockers were set a revised target of 147 runs in 15 overs due to rain.

== Standing ==
=== Points table ===
Pos	Team	Pld	W	L	NR	Pts	NRR	Qualification
1	Edinburgh Castle Rockers (C)	10	6	3	1	13	1.208	Advanced to the Final
2	Amsterdam Flames	10	6	3	1	13	1.037	Advanced to the Qualifier
3	Belfast Wolves (R)	10	6	3	1	13	0.602	Advanced to the Qualifier
4	Rotterdam Dockers	10	6	3	1	13	−0.024	Eliminated
5	Dublin Guardians	10	2	8	0	4	−0.943	Eliminated
6	Glasgow Cosmic	10	2	8	0	4	−1.450	Eliminated

Source: Cricinfo
(C) Champions; (R) Runners-up

=== Match summary ===
Team	League matches										Finals	
Team	1	2	3	4	5	6	7	8	9	10	QF	F
Edinburgh Castle Rockers	2	3	5	7	9	11	13	13	13	13		W

Win	Loss	Tie	No result

== Final ==
Final
20 September 2026
14:15
- Scorecard

Belfast Wolves; 150/5 (20 overs)	v	Edinburgh Castle Rockers; 151/3 (18.4 overs)
Tim Tector 84 (62); Trent Boult 2/21 (4 overs)		Andries Gous 90 (61); Matthew Humphreys 1/29 (4 overs)

Edinburgh Castle Rockers won by 7 wickets
Malahide Cricket Ground, Malahide
Umpires: Roland Black (Ire) and Gareth Morrison (Ire)
Player of the match: Andries Gous (Edinburgh Castle Rockers)

- Edinburgh Castle Rockers won the toss and elected to field.

== Administration and support staff ==
Position	Name
Co-owner	Kyle Mills
Co-owner	Nathan McCullum
Head coach	Trevor Bayliss
Captain	Mitchell Santner
