= 2026 Rotterdam Dockers season =

Dutch cricket team season

Rotterdam Dockers
2026 season
- Coach: Adrian Birrell
- Captain: Faf du Plessis
- Overseas player: Heinrich Klaasen; Mitchell Owen; Donovan Ferreira; Anrich Nortje; David Wiese; Sandeep Lamichhane; Shubham Ranjane
- League stage: 4th
- Knockout stage: did not qualify
- Most runs: Faf du Plessis (449)
- Most wickets: Anrich Nortje (19)

The 2026 Rotterdam Dockers season is the first season of the franchise in the European T20 Premier League (ETPL). The team is captained by Faf du Plessis and coached by Adrian Birrell.

Rotterdam began their inaugural campaign with a 5-wicket win over Amsterdam Flames a no-result against Belfast Wolves due to rain in their second game a 5-wicket win over Glasgow Cosmic a 7-wicket win over Dublin Guardians a 55-runs defeat to Edinburgh Castle Rockers a 8-wicket defeat to Amsterdam Flames

The ETPL is heading to Malahide Cricket Ground in Malahide, Ireland and the second half is ready to begin. a 31-runs win over Glasgow Cosmic a 7-wicket win over Belfast Wolves a 5-runs win over Edinburgh Castle Rockers Rotterdam completed their league campaign with a 5-wicket defeat to Dublin Guardians. The result also brought the qualification race to its conclusion, with Rotterdam eliminated and Belfast Wolves securing the final playoff place.

== Current squad ==
- Players with international caps are listed in **bold**.

Team roster 2026
Name	Nat.	Batting style	Bowling style	Role
Batters
**Faf du Plessis** (c)	South Africa	Right-handed	—N/a	Batter
**Michael Levitt**	Netherlands	Right-handed	—N/a	Batter
**Vikramjit Singh**	Netherlands	Left-handed	Right-arm medium	Batter
All-rounders
**Heinrich Klaasen**	South Africa	Right-handed	—N/a	Wicket-keeper batter
**Mitchell Owen**	Australia	Right-handed	Right-arm medium	All-rounder
**Ben Manenti**	Italy	Right-handed	Right-arm off break	All-rounder
**Roelof van der Merwe**	Netherlands	Left-handed	Slow left-arm orthodox	All-rounder
**Logan van Beek**	Netherlands	Right-handed	Right-arm medium-fast	All-rounder
**David Wiese**	Namibia	Right-handed	Right-arm medium-fast	All-rounder
**Shubham Ranjane**	United States	Right-handed	Right-arm medium	All-rounder
Wicket-keepers
**Donovan Ferreira** (wk)	South Africa	Right-handed	—N/a	Wicket-keeper batter
**Jai Moondra**	Ireland	Right-handed	—N/a	Wicket-keeper batter
Bowlers
**Anrich Nortje**	South Africa	Right-handed	Right-arm fast	Bowler
**Sandeep Lamichhane**	Nepal	Right-handed	Leg break	Bowler
**Ryan Klein**	Netherlands	Right-handed	Right-arm medium-fast	Bowler
**Jasper Davidson**	Scotland	Left-handed	Left-arm fast-medium	Bowler
**Saqib Zulfiqar**	Netherlands	Right-handed	Right-arm leg break	Bowler

== League stage ==
The fixtures for the inaugural season were announced on 28 July 2026 and are split in two legs: the first 17 matches will be played at Sportpark Westvliet in Voorburg, Netherlands, and the second 13 matches at the Malahide Cricket Ground in Malahide, Ireland.

=== Round 1 (Voorburg) ===
Match 1
26 August 2026
15:15
Scorecard

Amsterdam Flames; 157/8 (20 overs)	v	Rotterdam Dockers (H); 158/5 (18.1 overs)
Bas de Leede 75 (53); Roelof van der Merwe 2/21 (4 overs)		Faf du Plessis 83 (55); Kyle Klein 3/34 (4 overs)

Rotterdam Dockers won by 5 wickets
Sportpark Westvliet, Voorburg
Umpires: Nitin Bathi (Ned) and Chris Brown (NZ)
Player of the match: Faf du Plessis (Rotterdam Dockers)

- Rotterdam Dockers won the toss and elected to field.

Match 6
29 August 2026
15:15
Scorecard

Belfast Wolves; 156/9 (20 overs)	v	Rotterdam Dockers (H); 5/0 (1 over)
Devon Conway 41 (29); Anrich Nortje 5/11 (4 overs)		Faf du Plessis 4* (3)

No result
Sportpark Westvliet, Voorburg
Umpires: Rizwan Akram (Ned) and Chris Brown (NZ)

- Belfast Wolves won the toss and elected to bat.
- Rotterdam Dockers were set a revised target of 121 runs in 14 overs due to rain.
- No further play was possible due to rain.
- Anrich Nortje (Rotterdam Dockers) took his maiden five-wicket haul in T20s.

Match 9
1 September 2026
15:15
Scorecard

Glasgow Cosmic (H); 140/9 (20 overs)	v	Rotterdam Dockers; 141/5 (19.5 overs)
Liam Livingstone 54 (39); Anrich Nortje 3/20 (4 overs)		Ben McDermott 37* (24); Paul van Meekeren 3/21 (4 overs)

Rotterdam Dockers won by 5 wickets
Sportpark Westvliet, Voorburg
Umpires: Roland Black (Ire) and Chris Brown (NZ)
Player of the match: Ben McDermott (Rotterdam Dockers)

- Rotterdam Dockers won the toss and elected to field.

Match 10
2 September 2026
11:30
Scorecard

Dublin Guardians (H); 178/4 (20 overs)	v	Rotterdam Dockers; 179/3 (18.4 overs)
James Vince 95 (54); Roelof van der Merwe 2/35 (4 overs)		Faf du Plessis 79 (51); Josh Little 2/42 (4 overs)

Rotterdam Dockers won by 7 wickets
Sportpark Westvliet, Voorburg
Umpires: Nitin Bathi (Ned) and Chris Brown (NZ)
Player of the match: Faf du Plessis (Rotterdam Dockers)

- Rotterdam Dockers won the toss and elected to field.

Match 14
5 September 2026
11:30
Scorecard

Edinburgh Castle Rockers; 148 (19.3 overs)	v	Rotterdam Dockers (H); 93 (18 overs)
Brandon McMullen 37 (28); David Wiese 3/18 (3.3 overs)		Faf du Plessis 21 (19); Tom Curran 3/16 (4 overs)

Edinburgh Castle Rockers won by 55 runs
Sportpark Westvliet, Voorburg
Umpires: Nitin Bathi (Ned) and Roland Black (Ire)
Player of the match: Gareth Delany (Edinburgh Castle Rockers)

- Rotterdam Dockers won the toss and elected to field.

Match 17
6 September 2026
15:15
Scorecard

Rotterdam Dockers; 176/6 (20 overs)	v	Amsterdam Flames (H); 178/2 (17.4 overs)
Faf du Plessis 60 (47); Michael Bracewell 3/30 (4 overs)		Bas de Leede 69* (50); Ben Manenti 1/13 (1 over)

Amsterdam Flames won by 8 wickets
Sportpark Westvliet, Voorburg
Umpires: Rizwan Akram (Ned) and Ryan Milne (Sco)
Player of the match: Bas de Leede (Amsterdam Flames)

- Amsterdam Flames won the toss and elected to field.

=== Round 2 (Malahide) ===
Match 20
10 September 2026
14:15
Scorecard

Amsterdam Flames; 141 (20 overs)	v	Belfast Wolves (H); 144/5 (19 overs)
Bas de Leede 39 (20); Mark Adair 3/25 (4 overs)		David Miller 42* (26); Michael Bracewell 2/20 (3 overs)

Belfast Wolves won by 5 wickets
Malahide Cricket Ground, Malahide
Umpires: Jonathan Kennedy (Ire) and Chris Brown (NZ)
Player of the match: Mark Adair (Belfast Wolves)

- Belfast Wolves won the toss and elected to field.

Match 24
13 September 2026
10:30
Scorecard

Edinburgh Castle Rockers (H); 118 (18.3 overs)	v	Amsterdam Flames; 120/2 (14.5 overs)
Ross Adair 32 (16); Michael Bracewell 5/12 (4 overs)		Yuvraj Samra 40 (26); Mitchell Santner 1/31 (4)

Amsterdam Flames won by 8 wickets
Malahide Cricket Ground, Malahide
Umpires: Jonathan Kennedy (Ire) and Aidan Seaver (Ire)
Player of the match: Michael Bracewell (Amsterdam Flames)

- Amsterdam Flames won the toss and elected to field.
- Michael Bracewell (Amsterdam Flames) took his maiden five-wicket haul in T20s.

Match 26
15 September 2026
10:30
Scorecard

Amsterdam Flames (H); 214/5 (20 overs)	v	Dublin Guardians; 155/9 (20 overs)
Curtis Campher 66 (31); Craig Young 3/50 (4)		Daryl Mitchell 33 (33); Michael Bracewell 3/14 (4 overs)

Amsterdam Flames won by 59 runs
Malahide Cricket Ground, Malahide
Umpires: Gareth Morrison (Ire) and Aidan Seaver (Ire)
Player of the match: Curtis Campher (Amsterdam Flames)

- Dublin Guardians won the toss and elected to field.

Match 28
16 September 2026
14:15
Scorecard

Glasgow Cosmic (H); 126 (19.5 overs)	v	Amsterdam Flames; 127/5 (16 overs)
George Munsey 51 (45); Bas de Leede 4/6 (1.5 overs)		Curtis Campher 44 (30); Tymal Mills 2/32 (4 overs)

Amsterdam Flames won by 5 wickets
Malahide Cricket Ground, Malahide
Umpires: Roland Black (Ire) and Gareth Morrison (Ire)
Player of the match: David Payne (Amsterdam Flames)

- Amsterdam Flames won the toss and elected to field.

== Standing ==
=== Points table ===
Pos	Team	Pld	W	L	NR	Pts	NRR	Qualification
1	Edinburgh Castle Rockers	10	6	3	1	13	1.208	Advanced to the Final
2	Amsterdam Flames	10	6	3	1	13	1.037	Advanced to the Qualifier
3	Belfast Wolves	10	6	3	1	13	0.602	Advanced to the Qualifier
4	Rotterdam Dockers	10	6	3	1	13	−0.024	Eliminated
5	Dublin Guardians	10	2	8	0	4	−0.943	Eliminated
6	Glasgow Cosmic	10	2	8	0	4	−1.450	Eliminated

Source: Cricinfo

=== Match summary ===
Team	League matches										Finals	
Team	1	2	3	4	5	6	7	8	9	10	QF	F
Rotterdam Dockers	2	3	5	7	7	7	9	11	13	13		

Win	Loss	Tie	No result

== Administration and support staff ==
Rotterdam Dockers staff
Position	Name
Head coach	Adrian Birrell
Assistant coach	Heino Kuhn
Support staff	Stephan Myburgh
Support staff	Corey Rutgers
Physio	Craig Govender
Team manager	Hitesh Parekh
Analyst	Jay Shelat
