= 2026 European T20 Premier League =

Inaugural edition of European T20 Premier League

- Dates: 26 August – 20 September
- Cricket format: Twenty20
- Tournament format(s): Round-robin and playoffs
- Hosts: Ireland; Netherlands
- Champions: Edinburgh Castle Rockers (1st title)
- Runners-up: Belfast Wolves
- Participants: 6
- Matches: 32
- Player of the series: Faf du Plessis (Rotterdam Dockers)
- Most runs: Faf du Plessis (Rotterdam Dockers) (449)
- Most wickets: Michael Bracewell (Amsterdam Flames); Anrich Nortje (Rotterdam Dockers) (19 each)
- Official website: etplofficial.com

The 2026 European T20 Premier League (also known as the 2026 ETPL) was the inaugural season of the European T20 Premier League, a franchise Twenty20 cricket league founded by a group of Indian investors around Abhishek Bachchan, in partnership with the cricket boards of Scotland, Ireland, and the Netherlands. The tournament was played from 26 August to 20 September 2026.

In the final, Edinburgh Castle Rockers defeated Belfast Wolves by 7 wickets to win the inaugural title.

== Background ==
The tournament was launched as a joint franchise league for Ireland, Scotland and the Netherlands, with six city-based teams participating. The inaugural season was originally planned for 2025, but postponed to 2026 following investment delays and shifting commercial priorities, including investor focus on other franchise competitions such as The Hundred.

The inaugural season started on 26 August, with the Final scheduled for Sunday, 20 September 2026. The competition features 30 league-stage matches, followed by a Qualifier and the Final.

On Playoffs, Belfast Wolves defeated Amsterdam Flames by 7 wickets in the Qualifier. The inaugural ETPL season reaches its climax on 20th September as Edinburgh Castle Rockers take on Belfast Wolves in the final at Malahide.

=== Tournament format ===
The ETPL is played in a double round-robin format, with each of the six franchises playing every other team twice, resulting in 30 league-stage matches. At the end of the league stage, the team finishing first in the points table qualifies directly for the Final. The teams finishing second and third contest the Qualifier, with the winner advancing to the Final to face the table-toppers.

=== Schedule ===
The tournament started on 26 August, with Rotterdam Dockers facing Amsterdam Flames in Voorburg. Matches in Voorburg continue until 6 September before the tournament moves to Malahide on 9 September. The league stage concludes on 17 September, followed by the Qualifier on 19 September and the Final on 20 September.

=== Squad composition ===
Each team is allowed to build a squad of 17 players. Each ETPL squad consists of players from five categories: pre-signed overseas players, affiliated local players, European Associate players, Global Associate players, and local players selected through the ETPL Draft.

- Local Direct Signings: 2
- Local Draft Picks: 6
- Local Core Total: Minimum 8 local players from the Netherlands, Scotland, and Ireland combined
- European Associate Players: Minimum 1 player (excluding the Netherlands and Scotland)
- Global Associate Players: Minimum 1 and maximum 2 players
- Full Member Overseas Players: Maximum 7 players (excluding Ireland).

=== Playing XI Rules ===
- Local Players: Minimum 5 local players from the Netherlands, Scotland, or Ireland.
- Overseas: Maximum 4 overseas players from Test-playing nations (excluding Ireland).
- Associate: 2 associate players (any combination of Global Associate Players or European Associate Players)

== Teams ==
Team	City	Captain	Head coach
Amsterdam Flames	(Netherlands) Amsterdam	Scott Edwards	Ryan Cook
Dublin Guardians	(Republic of Ireland) Dublin	Ravichandran Ashwin	Vikram Rathour
Edinburgh Castle Rockers	(Scotland) Edinburgh	Mitchell Santner	James Foster
Glasgow Cosmic	(Scotland) Glasgow	George Munsey	Matthew Hayden
Belfast Wolves	(Northern Ireland) Belfast	Glenn Maxwell	Kevin O'Brien
Rotterdam Dockers	(Netherlands) Rotterdam	Faf du Plessis	Adrian Birrell

== Venues ==
All matches of the inaugural season will be played at Sportpark Westvliet in Voorburg, Netherlands, and Malahide Cricket Ground in Malahide, Ireland.

Voorburg	Malahide
Sportpark Westvliet	Malahide Cricket Ground
Capacity: 1,000	Capacity: 11,500
First 17 matches	Second 13 matches and Play-offs

== Squads ==
Amsterdam Flames	Dublin Guardians	Edinburgh Castle Rockers	Glasgow Cosmic	Belfast Wolves	Rotterdam Dockers
Scott Edwards (c, wk); ~~Mitchell Marsh (c)~~; Michael Bracewell; Curtis Campher; Tim David; Bas de Leede; Aryan Dutt; Richard Gleeson; Ali Hassan; Kyle Klein; Jordan Neill; Max O'Dowd; David Payne; Tim Pringle; Ajinkya Rahane; Yuvraj Samra; Steve Smith; ~~Dipendra Singh Airee~~	Ravichandran Ashwin (c); Ben Calitz (wk); Noah Croes; George Dockrell; Chris Greaves; Peter Hatzoglou; Matt Hollard; Sanjay Krishnamurthi; Josh Little; Daryl Mitchell; Vijay Shankar; Harmeet Singh; Harry Tector; James Vince; Muhammad Waseem; Chris Wood; Craig Young	Mitchell Santner (c); Ross Adair; Trent Boult; Tom Bruce; Tom Curran; Gareth Delany; Andries Gous (wk); Jack Jarvis; ~~Shadab Khan~~; Finlay McCreath; Brandon McMullen; Safyaan Sharif; JJ Smuts; Sean Solia; Khuzaima Tanveer; Charlie Tear (wk); Mark Watt	George Munsey (c); Finn Allen; Richie Berrington; Matthew Cross (wk); Brad Currie; Oliver Davidson; ~~Gerhard Erasmus~~; Moises Henriques; ~~Duan Jansen~~; Ali Khan; Michael Leask; Liam Livingstone; Keshav Maharaj; Christopher McBride; ~~Kamindu Mendis~~; Lungi Ngidi; Josh Philippe (wk); Jason Roy; Paul van Meekeren	Glenn Maxwell (c); Mark Adair; Mark Chapman; Devon Conway; Gavin Hoey; Matthew Humphreys; Zainullah Ihsan; Chris Jordan; Crishan Kalugamage; Fred Klaassen; Harry Manenti; David Miller; Saurabh Netravalkar; Alex Roy; Paul Stirling; Tim Tector; Lorcan Tucker (wk)	Faf du Plessis (c); Jasper Davidson; ~~Donovan Ferreira~~ (wk); Heinrich Klaasen (wk); Ryan Klein; ~~Sandeep Lamichhane~~; Michael Levitt; Ben Manenti; Ben McDermott; Colin Munro; Jai Moondra; Anrich Nortje; ~~Mitchell Owen~~; Shubham Ranjane; Roelof van der Merwe; Logan van Beek; Vikramjit Singh; David Wiese; Saqib Zulfiqar

- Mitchell Marsh was pulled out to prioritise Australia's upcoming white-ball series against Zimbabwe and South Africa.
- Shadab Khan was pulled out.
- Donovan Ferreira was pulled out due to injury.
- Mitchell Owen was pulled out.

== Standings ==
=== Points table ===
Pos	Team	Pld	W	L	NR	Pts	NRR	Qualification
1	Edinburgh Castle Rockers (C)	10	6	3	1	13	1.208	Advanced to the Final
2	Amsterdam Flames	10	6	3	1	13	1.037	Advanced to the Qualifier
3	Belfast Wolves (R)	10	6	3	1	13	0.602	Advanced to the Qualifier
4	Rotterdam Dockers	10	6	3	1	13	−0.024	Eliminated
5	Dublin Guardians	10	2	8	0	4	−0.943	Eliminated
6	Glasgow Cosmic	10	2	8	0	4	−1.450	Eliminated

Source: Cricinfo
(C) Champions; (R) Runners-up

=== Match summary ===
Team	Group matches										Playoffs	
Team	1	2	3	4	5	6	7	8	9	10	Q	F
Amsterdam Flames	0	1	1	3	5	7	7	9	11	13	L	
Belfast Wolves	2	3	5	5	7	7	9	9	11	13	W	L
Dublin Guardians	0	0	0	0	0	2	2	2	2	4		
Edinburgh Castle Rockers	2	3	5	7	9	11	13	13	13	13		W
Glasgow Cosmic	0	2	2	2	2	2	2	4	4	4		
Rotterdam Dockers	2	3	5	7	7	7	9	11	13	13		

Win	Loss	No result

- Note: The total points at the end of each group match are listed.
- Note: Click on the points (group matches) or W/L (playoffs) to see the match summary.

Visitor team →	AF	BW	DG	ECR	GC	RD
Home team ↓	AF	BW	DG	ECR	GC	RD
Amsterdam Flames		Belfast; 9 wickets	Amsterdam; 59 runs	Match abandoned	Amsterdam; 7 wickets	Amsterdam; 8 wickets
Belfast Wolves	Belfast; 5 wickets		Belfast; 52 runs	Edinburgh; 59 runs	Belfast; 103 runs	Rotterdam; 7 wickets
Dublin Guardians	Amsterdam; 9 runs	Dublin; 8 wickets		Edinburgh; 12 runs	Glasgow; 6 wickets	Rotterdam; 7 wickets
Edinburgh Castle Rockers	Amsterdam; 8 wickets	Belfast; 9 runs (DLS)	Edinburgh; 4 wickets		Edinburgh; 7 wickets	Rotterdam; 5 runs
Glasgow Cosmic	Amsterdam; 5 wickets	Belfast; 26 runs	Glasgow; 33 runs	Edinburgh; 7 wickets		Rotterdam; 5 wickets
Rotterdam Dockers	Rotterdam; 5 wickets	Match abandoned	Dublin; 5 wickets	Edinburgh; 55 runs	Rotterdam; 31 runs	

Home team won	Visitor team won

- Note: Results listed are according to the home (horizontal) and visitor (vertical) teams.
- Note: Click on a result to see a summary of the match.

== League stage ==
The fixtures for the inaugural season were announced on 28 July 2026 and are split in two legs: the first 17 matches will be played at Sportpark Westvliet in Voorburg, Netherlands, and the second 13 matches at the Malahide Cricket Ground in Malahide, Ireland.

=== Round 1 (Voorburg) ===
Match 1
26 August 2026
15:15
Scorecard

Amsterdam Flames; 157/8 (20 overs)	v	Rotterdam Dockers (H); 158/5 (18.1 overs)
Bas de Leede 75 (53); Roelof van der Merwe 2/21 (4 overs)		Faf du Plessis 83 (55); Kyle Klein 3/34 (4 overs)

Rotterdam Dockers won by 5 wickets
Sportpark Westvliet, Voorburg
Umpires: Nitin Bathi (Ned) and Chris Brown (NZ)
Player of the match: Faf du Plessis (Rotterdam Dockers)

- Rotterdam Dockers won the toss and elected to field.

Match 2
27 August 2026
11:30
Scorecard

Belfast Wolves (H); 184/7 (20 overs)	v	Dublin Guardians; 132/9 (20 overs)
Glenn Maxwell 60 (38); Chris Wood 3/43 (4 overs)		George Dockrell 35 (22); Matthew Humphreys 2/23 (4 overs)

Belfast Wolves won by 52 runs
Sportpark Westvliet, Voorburg
Umpires: Nitin Bathi (Ned) and David McLean (Sco)
Player of the match: Glenn Maxwell (Belfast Wolves)

- Dublin Guardians won the toss and elected to field.

Match 3
27 August 2026
15:15
Scorecard

Glasgow Cosmic; 115 (20 overs)	v	Edinburgh Castle Rockers (H); 116/3 (11.3 overs)
Keshav Maharaj 29* (27); Trent Boult 5/24 (4 overs)		Andries Gous 40* (28); Lungi Ngidi 1/13 (2 overs)

Edinburgh Castle Rockers won by 7 wickets
Sportpark Westvliet, Voorburg
Umpires: Rizwan Akram (Ned) and Chris Brown (NZ)
Player of the match: Trent Boult (Edinburgh Castle Rockers)

- Edinburgh Castle Rockers won the toss and elected to field.
- Trent Boult (Edinburgh Castle Rockers) took his maiden five-wicket haul in T20s.

Match 4
28 August 2026
15:15
Scorecard

Amsterdam Flames (H)	v	Edinburgh Castle Rockers

No result
Sportpark Westvliet, Voorburg
Umpires: Rizwan Akram (Ned) and Chris Brown (NZ)

- Edinburgh Castle Rockers won the toss and elected to field.
- No play was possible due to rain.

Match 5
29 August 2026
11:30
Scorecard

Glasgow Cosmic (H); 183/5 (20 overs)	v	Dublin Guardians; 150 (19.3 overs)
Jason Roy 60 (37); Matt Hollard 2/29 (4 overs)		Harry Tector 75 (45); Lungi Ngidi 4/21 (4 overs)

Glasgow Cosmic won by 33 runs
Sportpark Westvliet, Voorburg
Umpires: David McLean (Sco) and Ryan Milne (Sco)
Player of the match: Richie Berrington (Glasgow Cosmic)

- Dublin Guardians won the toss and elected to field.

Match 6
29 August 2026
15:15
Scorecard

Belfast Wolves; 156/9 (20 overs)	v	Rotterdam Dockers (H); 5/0 (1 over)
Devon Conway 41 (29); Anrich Nortje 5/11 (4 overs)		Faf du Plessis 4* (3)

No result
Sportpark Westvliet, Voorburg
Umpires: Rizwan Akram (Ned) and Chris Brown (NZ)

- Belfast Wolves won the toss and elected to bat.
- Rotterdam Dockers were set a revised target of 121 runs in 14 overs due to rain.
- No further play was possible due to rain.
- Anrich Nortje (Rotterdam Dockers) took his maiden five-wicket haul in T20s.

Match 7
30 August 2026
11:30
Scorecard

Amsterdam Flames (H); 56/2 (5 overs)	v	Belfast Wolves; 59/1 (3.5 overs)
Steve Smith 20 (10); Chris Jordan 1/18 (2 overs)		Paul Stirling 25* (10); Aryan Dutt 1/8 (1 overs)

Belfast Wolves won by 9 wickets
Sportpark Westvliet, Voorburg
Umpires: Roland Black (Ire) and Chris Brown (NZ)
Player of the match: Paul Stirling (Belfast Wolves)

- Belfast Wolves won the toss and elected to field.
- The match was reduced to 5 overs per side due to rain.
- David Rushmere (Amsterdam Flames) made his T20 debut.

Match 8
30 August 2026
15:15
Scorecard

Dublin Guardians; 109 (18 overs)	v	Edinburgh Castle Rockers (H); 110/6 (13.4 overs)
James Vince 40 (30); Mitchell Santner 5/16 (4 overs)		JJ Smuts 33 (24); George Dockrell 3/27 (4 overs)

Edinburgh Castle Rockers won by 4 wickets
Sportpark Westvliet, Voorburg
Umpires: Nitin Bathi (Ned) and David McLean (Sco)
Player of the match: Mitchell Santner (Edinburgh Castle Rockers)

- Dublin Guardians won the toss and elected to bat.
- Mitchell Santner (Edinburgh Castle Rockers) took his maiden five-wicket haul in T20s.

Match 9
1 September 2026
15:15
Scorecard

Glasgow Cosmic (H); 140/9 (20 overs)	v	Rotterdam Dockers; 141/5 (19.5 overs)
Liam Livingstone 54 (39); Anrich Nortje 3/20 (4 overs)		Ben McDermott 37* (24); Paul van Meekeren 3/21 (4 overs)

Rotterdam Dockers won by 5 wickets
Sportpark Westvliet, Voorburg
Umpires: Roland Black (Ire) and Chris Brown (NZ)
Player of the match: Ben McDermott (Rotterdam Dockers)

- Rotterdam Dockers won the toss and elected to field.

Match 10
2 September 2026
11:30
Scorecard

Dublin Guardians (H); 178/4 (20 overs)	v	Rotterdam Dockers; 179/3 (18.4 overs)
James Vince 95 (54); Roelof van der Merwe 2/35 (4 overs)		Faf du Plessis 79 (51); Josh Little 2/42 (4 overs)

Rotterdam Dockers won by 7 wickets
Sportpark Westvliet, Voorburg
Umpires: Nitin Bathi (Ned) and Chris Brown (NZ)
Player of the match: Faf du Plessis (Rotterdam Dockers)

- Rotterdam Dockers won the toss and elected to field.

Match 11
2 September 2026
15:15
Scorecard

Edinburgh Castle Rockers; 189/5 (20 overs)	v	Belfast Wolves (H); 130 (17.1 overs)
JJ Smuts 98 (60); Fred Klaassen 2/22 (4 overs)		Glenn Maxwell 35 (23); Tom Curran 4/20 (3.1 overs)

Edinburgh Castle Rockers won by 59 runs
Sportpark Westvliet, Voorburg
Umpires: Roland Black (Ire) and Ryan Milne (Sco)
Player of the match: JJ Smuts (Edinburgh Castle Rockers)

- Belfast Wolves won the toss and elected to field.

Match 12
3 September 2026
15:15
Scorecard

Glasgow Cosmic; 171/8 (20 overs)	v	Amsterdam Flames (H); 177/3 (16.5 overs)
George Munsey 67 (49); Tim Pringle 2/23 (4 overs)		Yuvraj Samra 73 (32); Keshav Maharaj 1/34 (4 overs)

Amsterdam Flames won by 7 wickets
Sportpark Westvliet, Voorburg
Umpires: Chris Brown (NZ) and Roland Black (Ire)
Player of the match: Yuvraj Samra (Amsterdam Flames)

- Glasgow Cosmic won the toss and elected to bat.

Match 13
4 September 2026
15:15
Scorecard

Belfast Wolves; 146/3 (12 overs)	v	Glasgow Cosmic (H); 120/8 (12 overs)
Mark Chapman 71* (33); Lungi Ngidi 1/31 (3 overs)		Jason Roy 54 (28); Fred Klaassen 3/21 (3 overs)

Belfast Wolves won by 26 runs
Sportpark Westvliet, Voorburg
Umpires: Chris Brown (NZ) and Ryan Milne (Sco)
Player of the match: Mark Chapman (Belfast Wolves)

- Glasgow Cosmic won the toss and elected to field.
- The match was reduced to 12 overs per side due to rain.

Match 14
5 September 2026
11:30
Scorecard

Edinburgh Castle Rockers; 148 (19.3 overs)	v	Rotterdam Dockers (H); 93 (18 overs)
Brandon McMullen 37 (28); David Wiese 3/18 (3.3 overs)		Faf du Plessis 21 (19); Tom Curran 3/16 (4 overs)

Edinburgh Castle Rockers won by 55 runs
Sportpark Westvliet, Voorburg
Umpires: Nitin Bathi (Ned) and Roland Black (Ire)
Player of the match: Gareth Delany (Edinburgh Castle Rockers)

- Rotterdam Dockers won the toss and elected to field.

Match 15
5 September 2026
15:15
Scorecard

Amsterdam Flames; 169/7 (20 overs)	v	Dublin Guardians (H); 160/8 (20 overs)
Steve Smith 38 (27); George Dockrell 2/31 (4 overs)		James Vince 73 (46); Tim Pringle 3/22 (4 overs)

Amsterdam Flames won by 9 runs
Sportpark Westvliet, Voorburg
Umpires: David McLean (Sco) and Rizwan Akram (Ned)
Player of the match: Tim Pringle (Amsterdam Flames)

- Dublin Guardians won the toss and elected to field.

Match 16
6 September 2026
11:30
Scorecard

Glasgow Cosmic (H); 159/6 (20 overs)	v	Edinburgh Castle Rockers; 163/3 (19 overs)
Richie Berrington 38 (20); Tom Curran 2/29 (4 overs)		Brandon McMullen 82* (47); Oliver Davidson 2/31 (4 overs)

Edinburgh Castle Rockers won by 7 wickets
Sportpark Westvliet, Voorburg
Umpires: Chris Brown (NZ) and David McLean (Sco)
Player of the match: Brandon McMullen (Edinburgh Castle Rockers)

- Edinburgh Castle Rockers won the toss and elected to field.

Match 17
6 September 2026
15:15
Scorecard

Rotterdam Dockers; 176/6 (20 overs)	v	Amsterdam Flames (H); 178/2 (17.4 overs)
Faf du Plessis 60 (47); Michael Bracewell 3/30 (4 overs)		Bas de Leede 69* (50); Ben Manenti 1/13 (1 over)

Amsterdam Flames won by 8 wickets
Sportpark Westvliet, Voorburg
Umpires: Rizwan Akram (Ned) and Ryan Milne (Sco)
Player of the match: Bas de Leede (Amsterdam Flames)

- Amsterdam Flames won the toss and elected to field.

=== Round 2 (Malahide) ===
Match 18
9 September 2026
14:15
Scorecard

Belfast Wolves; 107 (19.4 overs)	v	Dublin Guardians (H); 111/2 (14.3 overs)
Harry Manenti 24 (21); Craig Young 5/21 (4 overs)		David Willey 44 (25); Glenn Maxwell 1/2 (1 over)

Dublin Guardians won by 8 wickets
Malahide Cricket Ground, Malahide
Umpires: Gareth Morrison (Ire) and Chris Brown (NZ)
Player of the match: Craig Young (Dublin Guardians)

- Dublin Guardians won the toss and elected to field.

Match 19
10 September 2026
10:30
Scorecard

Rotterdam Dockers (H); 172/4 (19 overs)	v	Glasgow Cosmic; 141/9 (19 overs)
Faf du Plessis 71 (42); Tymal Mills 2/35 (4 overs)		Jimmy Neesham 28 (17); Logan van Beek 4/19 (4 overs)

Rotterdam Dockers won by 31 runs
Malahide Cricket Ground, Malahide
Umpires: Aidan Seaver (Ire) and Nitin Bathi (Ned)
Player of the match: Faf du Plessis (Rotterdam Dockers)

- Glasgow Cosmic won the toss and elected to field.
- The match was reduced to 19 overs per side due to rain.

Match 20
10 September 2026
14:15
Scorecard

Amsterdam Flames; 141 (20 overs)	v	Belfast Wolves (H); 144/5 (19 overs)
Bas de Leede 39 (20); Mark Adair 3/25 (4 overs)		David Miller 42* (26); Michael Bracewell 2/20 (3 overs)

Belfast Wolves won by 5 wickets
Malahide Cricket Ground, Malahide
Umpires: Jonathan Kennedy (Ire) and Chris Brown (NZ)
Player of the match: Mark Adair (Belfast Wolves)

- Belfast Wolves won the toss and elected to field.

Match 21
11 September 2026
14:15
Scorecard

Edinburgh Castle Rockers; 174/4 (20 overs)	v	Dublin Guardians (H); 162/8 (20 overs)
Brandon McMullen 69* (49); Craig Young 3/42 (4 overs)		Harry Tector 45 (29); Jack Jarvis 4/34 (4 overs)

Edinburgh Castle Rockers won by 12 runs
Malahide Cricket Ground, Malahide
Umpires: Chris Brown (NZ) and Aidan Seaver (Ire)
Player of the match: Brandon McMullen (Edinburgh Castle Rockers)

- Dublin Guardians won the toss and elected to field.

Match 22
12 September 2026
10:30
Scorecard

Belfast Wolves (H); 161/6 (20 overs)	v	Rotterdam Dockers; 162/3 (18 overs)
Lorcan Tucker 58 (42); Anrich Nortje 2/37 (4 overs)		Heinrich Klaasen 47* (26); Harry Manenti 1/12 (2 overs)

Rotterdam Dockers won by 7 wickets
Malahide Cricket Ground, Malahide
Umpires: Roland Black (Ire) and Gareth Morrison (Ire)
Player of the match: Heinrich Klaasen (Rotterdam Dockers)

- Rotterdam Dockers won the toss and elected to field.

Match 23
12 September 2026
14:15
Scorecard

Dublin Guardians (H); 159 (19.3 overs)	v	Glasgow Cosmic; 162/4 (18.5 overs)
Vijay Shankar 67 (43); Ali Khan 4/22 (3.3 overs)		George Munsey 50* (33); Ravichandran Ashwin 1/17 (4 overs)

Glasgow Cosmic won by 6 wickets
Malahide Cricket Ground, Malahide
Umpires: Nitin Bathi (Ned) and Jonathan Kennedy (Ire)
Player of the match: George Munsey (Glasgow Cosmic)

- Dublin Guardians won the toss and elected to bat.

Match 24
13 September 2026
10:30
Scorecard

Edinburgh Castle Rockers (H); 118 (18.3 overs)	v	Amsterdam Flames; 120/2 (14.5 overs)
Ross Adair 32 (16); Michael Bracewell 5/12 (4 overs)		Yuvraj Samra 40 (26); Mitchell Santner 1/31 (4)

Amsterdam Flames won by 8 wickets
Malahide Cricket Ground, Malahide
Umpires: Jonathan Kennedy (Ire) and Aidan Seaver (Ire)
Player of the match: Michael Bracewell (Amsterdam Flames)

- Amsterdam Flames won the toss and elected to field.
- Michael Bracewell (Amsterdam Flames) took his maiden five-wicket haul in T20s.

Match 25
13 September 2026
14:15
Scorecard

Belfast Wolves (H); 187/8 (20 overs)	v	Glasgow Cosmic; 84 (14.5 overs)
Mark Chapman 54 (25); Liam Livingstone 3/27 (4 overs)		Moises Henriques 31 (25); Matthew Humphreys 4/19 (4 overs)

Belfast Wolves won by 103 runs
Malahide Cricket Ground, Malahide
Umpires: Gareth Morrison (Ire) and Roland Black (Ire)
Player of the match: Matthew Humphreys (Belfast Wolves)

- Glasgow Cosmic won the toss and elected to field.

Match 26
15 September 2026
10:30
Scorecard

Amsterdam Flames (H); 214/5 (20 overs)	v	Dublin Guardians; 155/9 (20 overs)
Curtis Campher 66 (31); Craig Young 3/50 (4)		Daryl Mitchell 33 (33); Michael Bracewell 3/14 (4 overs)

Amsterdam Flames won by 59 runs
Malahide Cricket Ground, Malahide
Umpires: Gareth Morrison (Ire) and Aidan Seaver (Ire)
Player of the match: Curtis Campher (Amsterdam Flames)

- Dublin Guardians won the toss and elected to field.

Match 27
15 September 2026
14:15
Scorecard

Rotterdam Dockers; 181/6 (20 overs)	v	Edinburgh Castle Rockers (H); 176/5 (20 overs)
Faf du Plessis 54 (35); Reece Topley 2/36 (4 overs)		Brandon McMullen 47 (30); Shubham Ranjane 3/22 (4 overs)

Rotterdam Dockers won by 5 runs
Malahide Cricket Ground, Malahide
Umpires: Rizwan Akram (Ned) and Jonathan Kennedy (Ire)
Player of the match: Shubham Ranjane (Rotterdam Dockers)

- Rotterdam Dockers won the toss and elected to bat.

Match 28
16 September 2026
14:15
Scorecard

Glasgow Cosmic (H); 126 (19.5 overs)	v	Amsterdam Flames; 127/5 (16 overs)
George Munsey 51 (45); Bas de Leede 4/6 (1.5 overs)		Curtis Campher 44 (30); Tymal Mills 2/32 (4 overs)

Amsterdam Flames won by 5 wickets
Malahide Cricket Ground, Malahide
Umpires: Roland Black (Ire) and Gareth Morrison (Ire)
Player of the match: David Payne (Amsterdam Flames)

- Amsterdam Flames won the toss and elected to field.

Match 29
17 September 2026
10:30
Scorecard

Belfast Wolves; 190/4 (20 overs)	v	Edinburgh Castle Rockers (H); 137/6 (15 overs)
Glenn Maxwell 82* (40); Tom Curran 2/43 (4 overs)		Andries Gous 34 (29); Matthew Humphreys 2/9 (3 overs)

Belfast Wolves won by 9 runs (DLS method)
Malahide Cricket Ground, Malahide
Umpires: Aidan Seaver (Ire) and Nitin Bathi (Ned)
Player of the match: Glenn Maxwell (Belfast Wolves)

- Edinburgh Castle Rockers won the toss and elected to field.
- Edinburgh Castle Rockers were set a revised target of 147 runs in 15 overs due to rain.

Match 30
17 September 2026
14:15
Scorecard

Rotterdam Dockers (H); 188/5 (20 overs)	v	Dublin Guardians; 192/5 (19 overs)
Heinrich Klaasen 85* (41); David Willey 2/45 (4 overs)		James Vince 106* (61); Shubham Ranjane 2/28 (4 overs)

Dublin Guardians won by 5 wickets
Malahide Cricket Ground, Malahide
Umpires: Jonathan Kennedy (Ire) and Rizwan Akram (Ned)
Player of the match: James Vince (Dublin Guardians)

- Dublin Guardians won the toss and elected to field.

== Playoffs ==
=== Bracket ===
Qualifier			Final
			QW	Belfast Wolves	150/5 (20 overs)
2	Amsterdam Flames	133 (20 overs)	1	Edinburgh Castle Rockers	151/3 (18.4 overs)
3	Belfast Wolves	136/3 (18.3 overs)

=== Qualifier ===
Qualifier
19 September 2026
14:15
Scorecard

Amsterdam Flames; 133 (20 overs)	v	Belfast Wolves; 136/3 (18.3 overs)
Steve Smith 45 (42); Glenn Maxwell 4/18 (4 overs)		Devon Conway 35 (41); Michael Bracewell 2/20 (4 overs)

Belfast Wolves won by 7 wickets
Malahide Cricket Ground, Malahide
Umpires: Aidan Seaver (Ire) and Jonathan Kennedy (Ire)
Player of the match: Glenn Maxwell (Belfast Wolves)

- Belfast Wolves won the toss and elected to field.

=== Final ===
Final
20 September 2026
14:15
Scorecard

Belfast Wolves; 150/5 (20 overs)	v	Edinburgh Castle Rockers; 151/3 (18.4 overs)
Tim Tector 84 (62); Trent Boult 2/21 (4 overs)		Andries Gous 90 (61); Matthew Humphreys 1/29 (4 overs)

Edinburgh Castle Rockers won by 7 wickets
Malahide Cricket Ground, Malahide
Umpires: Roland Black (Ire) and Gareth Morrison (Ire)
Player of the match: Andries Gous (Edinburgh Castle Rockers)

- Edinburgh Castle Rockers won the toss and elected to field.

== Statistics ==
=== Most Runs ===
Runs	Player	Team	Inns.	SR	HS	Avg.	50/100	4's	6's
353	Faf du Plessis	Rotterdam Dockers	8	141.20	83*	58.83	4/0	33	11
279	Brandon McMullen	Edinburgh Castle Rockers	7	157.62	82*	55.80	2/0	23	13
271	Mark Chapman	Belfast Wolves	9	166.25	71*	33.87	3/0	20	17
264	James Vince	Dublin Guardians	7	145.05	95*	44.00	2/0	28	10
257	Bas de Leede	Amsterdam Flames	7	137.43	75	64.25	2/0	27	6
Source: Cricinfo Updated: 14 September 2026

=== Most wickets ===
Wickets	Player	Team	Inns.	Econ.	BBI
19	Anrich Nortje	Rotterdam Dockers	8	6.40	5/11
16	David Wiese	Rotterdam Dockers	8	7.21	3/18
14	Michael Bracewell	Amsterdam Flames	6	6.20	5/12
14	Trent Boult	Edinburgh Castle Rockers	7	6.64	5/24
12	Tom Curran	Edinburgh Castle Rockers	6	6.37	4/20
Source: Cricinfo Updated: 14 September 2026

== Broadcasting ==
The league will be broadcast live on the following channels.

Region(s)/countries	Television rights	Streaming rights
Indian subcontinent	Star Sports	JioHotstar
United Kingdom	TNT Sports	HBO Max
Ireland	TNT Sports	HBO Max
Australia	Foxtel	Kayo Sports
Caribbean	Rush Sports	Rush Live & Louder
United States	Willow	Cricbuzz
Canada	Willow	Cricbuzz
Middle East and North Africa	—N/a	Cricbuzz
Southeast Asia	—N/a	Cricbuzz
South Africa	—N/a	Olympic Channel
New Zealand	—N/a	Olympic Channel
Netherlands	—N/a	Olympic Channel

== See also ==
- European T20 Premier League
- Cricket Scotland
- Cricket Ireland
- Royal Dutch Cricket Association
