= Development Panel of ICC Umpires =

International cricket umpires panel

The International Panel of ICC Development Umpires is a panel of international cricket umpires chosen by the International Cricket Council (ICC). Established in 2005, its members are drawn from the organisation's associate members; representatives of full members have been members of the panel in the past. It stands alongside, and is intended to offer a career path into the Elite Panel of ICC Umpires. Umpires on the panel are not restricted to matches between associate teams, and have officiated at One Day International (ODI) and Twenty20 International level.

A number of female umpires including Lauren Agenbag, Kim Cotton, Shivani Mishra, Claire Polosak, Sue Redfern, Eloise Sheridan, Mary Waldron, Jacqueline Williams, Narayanan Janani and Vrinda Rathi have been included in the panel in the past.

== Current panel ==
The panel has a current membership of 37.

International Panel of ICC Development Umpires
Umpire	Country	Region
Ravi Angara	Botswana	Africa
David Odhiambo	Kenya	Africa
Andrew Louw	Namibia	Africa
Ewoud Lassen	Namibia	Africa
Habib Enesi	Nigeria	Africa
Adil Kassam	Tanzania	Africa
Precious Smith	Bermuda	Americas
Arnold Maddela	Canada	Americas
Harry Grewal	Canada	Americas
Rohan Shah	Canada	Americas
Paul Manning	Cayman Islands	Americas
Aditya Gajjar	United States	Americas
Jermaine Lindo	United States	Americas
Vijaya Mallela	United States	Americas
Tabarak Dar	Hong Kong	Asia
Viswanadan Kalidas	Malaysia	Asia
Buddhi Pradhan	Nepal	Asia
Durga Subedi	Nepal	Asia
Rahul Asher	Oman	Asia
Vinod Babu	Oman	Asia
Shivani Mishra	Qatar	Asia
Akbar Ali	United Arab Emirates	Asia
Shiju Sam	United Arab Emirates	Asia
Aasif Iqbal	United Arab Emirates	Asia
Suresh Subramanian	Indonesia	East Asia-Pacific
Adam Birss	Japan	East Asia-Pacific
Koita Atai	Papua New Guinea	East Asia-Pacific
Meriel Kenni	Vanuatu	East Asia-Pacific
Srinidhi Ravindra	Finland	Europe
Mark Jameson	Germany	Europe
Sunil Chandiramani	Gibraltar	Europe
Rizwan Akram	Netherlands	Europe
Nitin Bathi	Netherlands	Europe
Maulik Prabhudesai	Netherlands	Europe
David McLean	Scotland	Europe
Iain McDonald	Scotland	Europe
Ryan Milne	Scotland	Europe

== See also ==
- Elite Panel of ICC Referees
- Elite Panel of ICC Umpires
- International Panel of ICC Umpires
