= Vijay Shankar =

Indian cricketer (born 1991)

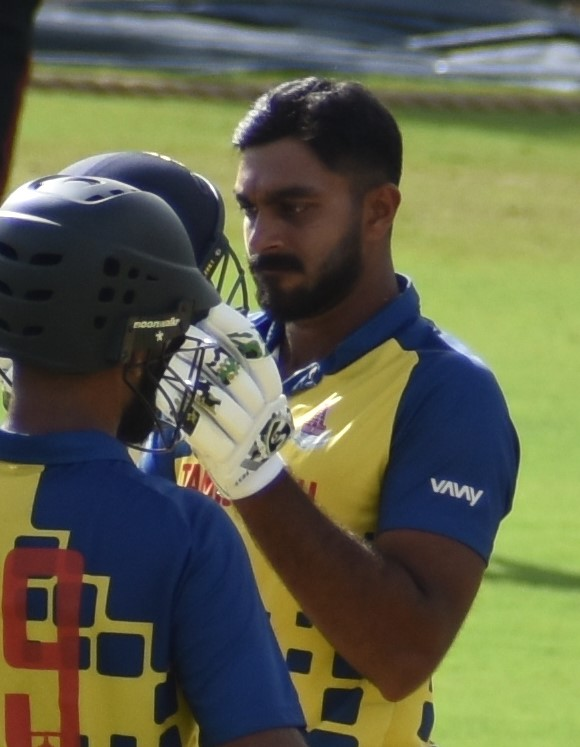
- Shankar during the 2019–20 Vijay Hazare Trophy

Personal information
- Born: 26 January 1991 (age 35); Tirunelveli, Tamil Nadu, India
- Height: 1.83 m (6 ft 0 in)
- Batting: Right-handed
- Bowling: Right-arm medium
- Role: All-rounder

International information
- National side: India (2018–2019)
- ODI debut (cap 226): 18 January 2019 v Australia
- Last ODI: 27 June 2019 v West Indies
- T20I debut (cap 74): 6 March 2018 v Sri Lanka
- Last T20I: 27 February 2019 v Australia

Domestic team information
- Years: Team
- 2012–2025: Tamil Nadu
- 2014, 2025: Chennai Super Kings
- 2017, 2019–2021: Sunrisers Hyderabad
- 2018: Delhi Daredevils
- 2022–2024: Gujarat Titans
- 2025/26: Tripura
- 2026: Kandy Royals
- 2026: Dublin Guardians

Career statistics
Competition	ODI	T20I	LA	T20
Matches	12	9	112	173
Runs scored	223	101	2,790	2,877
Batting average	31.85	25.25	34.87	26.63
100s/50s	0/0	0/0	2/15	0/13
Top score	46	43	129	69*
Balls bowled	233	126	2,804	971
Wickets	4	5	73	39
Bowling average	52.50	38.20	33.34	34.15
5 wickets in innings	0	0	0	0
10 wickets in match	0	0	0	0
Best bowling	2/15	2/32	4/30	3/12
Catches/stumpings	7/–	2/–	42/–	78/–
- Source: Cricinfo, 25 September 2026

Vijay Shankar (born 26 January 1991) is an Indian cricketer. He is an all-rounder, who bats right-handed and bowls right-arm medium pace. He represented the Indian national team from 2018 to 2019, and Tamil Nadu and Tripura in domestic cricket.

== Domestic career ==
Playing for Tamil Nadu, he won two Man of the Match awards in the knockout stage of 2014–15 Ranji Trophy. In the quarterfinal against Vidarbha, he scored 111 and 82 for which he was named man of the match. The match was drawn but Tamil Nadu progressed to the next round on first-innings lead. Against Maharashtra in the semifinal, he scored 91 and picked 2/47 to win his second man of the match award. This game was also drawn and Tamil Nadu progressed to the final on first-innings lead. In the final against Karnataka, he scored 5 & 103 and picked 1/92. However, Karnataka registered an innings victory to take the title.

He led the Tamil Nadu team to title triumphs in 2016–17 Vijay Hazare Trophy and 2016–17 Deodhar Trophy.

In October 2018, he was named in India C's squad for the 2018–19 Deodhar Trophy. He was the leading wicket-taker in the tournament, with seven dismissals in three matches. The following month, he was named as one of eight players to watch ahead of the 2018–19 Ranji Trophy.

In October 2019, he was named in India B's squad for the 2019–20 Deodhar Trophy.

He captained the Tamil Nadu team in their title winning 2021–22 Syed Mushtaq Ali Trophy campaign.

In late 2025, he joined Tripura for the 2025–2026 domestic season.

On 22 May 2026, he announced his retirement from Indian domestic cricket and the IPL, to pursue new opportunities and play franchise cricket overseas.

== International career ==
On 20 November 2017, he was named as Bhuvneshwar Kumar's replacement in India's Test squad for their series against Sri Lanka, but he did not play.

In February 2018, he was named in India's Twenty20 International (T20I) squad for the 2018 Nidahas Trophy. He made his T20I debut for India against Sri Lanka in the 2018 Nidahas Trophy on 6 March 2018. He took his first wicket in T20Is in his second match, dismissing Mushfiqur Rahim. In the second match of the 2018 Nidahas Trophy, he took two wickets for 32 runs, with India winning by 6 wickets, and he was named the player of the match.

In January 2019, Shankar was named the replacement for Hardik Pandya, for the remaining two One Day Internationals (ODI) of the Australian tour and the whole limited-overs series in New Zealand. On 18 January 2019, he made his ODI debut against Australia at the Melbourne Cricket Ground.

In April 2019, he was named in India's squad for the 2019 Cricket World Cup ahead of experienced players like Ambati Rayudu and Suresh Raina which created a media buzz around the time. The International Cricket Council named him as one of the five surprise picks for the tournament. He played for India in 2019 Cricket World Cup, where he became the first Indian to pick up a wicket on the first ball of his World Cup debut. In the match against Pakistan, he took a wicket with his first ball, becoming the third player to do so at a World Cup. Then, Shankar was ruled out of India's final two matches due to an injury, with Mayank Agarwal named as his replacement.

== Franchise career ==
=== Indian Premier League ===
In the Indian Premier League, he played one match for the Chennai Super Kings in 2014 and four for Sunrisers Hyderabad in 2017. His highest batting score was 63 not out against Gujarat Lions on 13 May 2017.

In January 2018, he was bought by the Delhi Daredevils in the 2018 IPL auction.

He was traded back to the Sunrisers Hyderabad for the 2019 IPL season.

In February 2022, he was bought by the Gujarat Titans in the auction for the 2022 Indian Premier League tournament.

He played for Chennai Super Kings again in 2025.

=== Lanka Premier League ===
On 26 May 2026, Shankar joined the Kandy Royals as one of the team's marquee signings in the Lanka Premier League following his retirement from the IPL and domestic cricket.

=== European T20 Premier League ===
In August 2026, Shankar joined the Dublin Guardians as an overseas player for the 2026 European T20 Premier League, under the captaincy of his long-time teammate Ravichandran Ashwin.

== Personal life ==
On 20 August 2020, Shankar announced engagement with Vaishali Visweswaran and married her on 27 January 2021. The couple welcomed their first child on 30 October 2021.
