= Rotterdam Dockers =

Rotterdam-based cricket franchise in European T20 Premier League (ETPL)

- Nickname: The Dockers
- League: European T20 Premier League

Personnel
- Captain: Faf du Plessis
- Coach: Adrian Birrell
- Owner: Faf du Plessis, Jonty Rhodes, Heinrich Klaasen, John Abraham

Team information
- City: Rotterdam, Netherlands
- Colours: Forest Green, Orange, White
- Founded: April 30, 2026; 4 months ago

History
- ETPL wins: 0
- Official website: rotterdamdockers
T20 kit

The Rotterdam Dockers are a professional Twenty20 franchise cricket team based in Rotterdam, Netherlands. They compete in the European T20 Premier League (ETPL).

The team was announced as one of the inaugural franchises of the ETPL in 2026 and represents the city of Rotterdam in the competition. The Dockers are owned by a consortium led by former South African international cricketers Faf du Plessis, Jonty Rhodes and Heinrich Klaasen. The team is coached by Adrian Birrell and is captained by Faf du Plessis.

== History ==
=== Formation and ownership ===
The franchise was announced on 30 April 2026 as the Rotterdam-based team of the ETPL. The Dockers are owned by a consortium led by former South African international cricketers Faf du Plessis, Jonty Rhodes and Heinrich Klaasen. The ownership group later expanded with the addition of Indian actor and sports entrepreneur John Abraham as a co-owner ahead of the inaugural ETPL season.

The franchise represents the city of Rotterdam, one of the Netherlands' largest cities and home to one of Europe's busiest ports. The team name "Dockers" reflects the city's maritime heritage and connection with the port industry. Former South African captain Faf du Plessis was appointed as the team's captain and became the leading figure of the franchise's sporting project. The ownership group stated that the Dockers would focus on combining international experience with the development of Dutch and European cricket talent.

=== 2026: Inaugural season ===
The Dockers quickly assembled a strong squad ahead of the inaugural 2026 season, appointing South African veteran Faf du Plessis as captain and signing explosive wicketkeeper-batter Heinrich Klaasen alongside fellow South African fast bowler Anrich Nortje. Australian wicketkeeper-batter Ben McDermott and all-rounder Mitchell Owen, Welsh batter Aneurin Donald, and Namibian all-rounder David Wiese were also brought in. Dutch internationals Logan van Beek, Roelof van der Merwe, Michael Levitt, Ryan Klein, Vikramjit Singh, and Saqib Zulfiqar, along with Italian all-rounder Ben Manenti, American all-rounder Shubham Ranjane, Irish bowler Jai Moondra, and Scottish bowler Jasper Davidson, completed the squad. Nepalese leg-spinner Sandeep Lamichhane was also signed.

Ahead of the inaugural season opener, the team announced it would be led by South African Faf du Plessis and coached by Adrian Birrell.

Rotterdam began their inaugural ETPL campaign with a 5-wicket over Amsterdam Flames a no-result against Belfast Wolves due to rain a 5-wicket win over Glasgow Cosmic a 7-wicket win over Dublin Guardians a 55-runs defeat to Edinburgh Castle Rockers a 8-wicket defeat to Amsterdam Flames

The ETPL is heading to Malahide Cricket Ground in Malahide, Ireland and the second half is ready to begin. a 31-runs win over Glasgow Cosmic a 7-wicket win over Belfast Wolves a 5-runs win over Edinburgh Castle Rockers Rotterdam completed their league campaign with a 5-wicket defeat to Dublin Guardians. The result also brought the qualification race to its conclusion, with Rotterdam eliminated and Belfast Wolves securing the final playoff place.

== Current squad ==
- Players with international caps are listed in **bold**.

Team roster
Name	Nat.	Batting style	Bowling style	Role
Batters
**Faf du Plessis** (c)	South Africa	Right-handed	—N/a	Batter
**Michael Levitt**	Netherlands	Right-handed	—N/a	Batter
**Vikramjit Singh**	Netherlands	Left-handed	Right-arm medium	Batter
All-rounders
**Mitchell Owen**	Australia	Right-handed	Right-arm medium	All-rounder
**Ben Manenti**	Italy	Right-handed	Right-arm off break	All-rounder
**Roelof van der Merwe**	Netherlands	Left-handed	Slow left-arm orthodox	All-rounder
**Logan van Beek**	Netherlands	Right-handed	Right-arm medium-fast	All-rounder
**David Wiese**	Namibia	Right-handed	Right-arm medium-fast	All-rounder
**Shubham Ranjane**	United States	Right-handed	Right-arm medium	All-rounder
Wicket-keepers
**Donovan Ferreira**	South Africa	Right-handed	—N/a	Wicket-keeper batter
**Heinrich Klaasen**	South Africa	Right-handed	—N/a	Wicket-keeper batter
**Ben McDermott**	Australia	Right-handed	—N/a	Wicket-keeper batter
Bowlers
**Jai Moondra**	Ireland	Left-handed	Left-arm fast	Bowler
**Anrich Nortje**	South Africa	Right-handed	Right-arm fast	Bowler
**Sandeep Lamichhane**	Nepal	Right-handed	Leg break	Bowler
**Ryan Klein**	Netherlands	Right-handed	Right-arm medium-fast	Bowler
**Jasper Davidson**	Scotland	Left-handed	Left-arm fast-medium	Bowler
**Saqib Zulfiqar**	Netherlands	Right-handed	Right-arm leg break	Bowler

== Administration and support staff ==
Rotterdam Dockers staff
Position	Name
Head coach	Adrian Birrell
Assistant coach	Heino Kuhn
Support staff	Stephan Myburgh
Support staff	Corey Rutgers
Physio	Craig Govender
Team manager	Hitesh Parekh
Analyst	Jay Shelat

== Seasons ==
=== Summaries ===
Season	W–L	Pos.	Finals	Coach	Captain	Most Runs	Most Wickets	Refs
2026	6–3	4th	DNQ	Adrian Birrell	Faf du Plessis	Faf du Plessis (449)	Anrich Nortje (19)	

=== Tournament finishes ===
Year	League standing	Final standing
2026	4th out of 6	League stage

- C: Champions
- RU: Runner-up
- SF: Team qualified for the semi-final stage of the competition

=== Statistics ===
Year	Played	Wins	Losses	Tied/NR (Note: NR indicates "no result"; abandoned matches are indicated as no result.)
2026	10	6	3	1

== See also ==
- European T20 Premier League
- Amsterdam Flames
