= Edinburgh Castle Rockers =

Edinburgh based franchise cricket team in European T20 Premier League (ETPL)

- Nickname: The Rockers
- League: European T20 Premier League

Personnel
- Captain: (New Zealand) Mitchell Santner
- Coach: (Australia) Trevor Bayliss
- Overseas players: (New Zealand) Trent Boult; (England) Tom Curran; (South Africa) JJ Smuts; (United States) Andries Gous; (Australia) Andrew Tye; (England) Laurie Evans; (Samoa) Sean Solia
- Owner: Kyle Mills, Nathan McCullum

Team information
- City: Edinburgh, Scotland
- Colours: Navy Blue, Gold, White
- Founded: January 21, 2026; 8 months ago
- Home ground: The Grange Club
- Capacity: 5,000

History
- ETPL wins: 1
- Official website: thecastlerockers.com
T20 kit

The Edinburgh Castle Rockers is a Scottish professional Twenty20 cricket team based in Edinburgh, Scotland. They compete in the European T20 Premier League (ETPL).

The Castle Rockers were announced as one of the league's three foundation franchises on 21 January 2026, and represent Scotland in the ETPL alongside the Glasgow Cosmic.

The franchise is owned by former New Zealand cricketer Kyle Mills and Nathan McCullum. The team is coached by Trevor Bayliss and is captained by Mitchell Santner.

== History ==
=== Formation and ownership ===
The Edinburgh Castle Rockers were established as part of the inaugural European T20 Premier League, a competition first conceived in 2019 by the cricket boards of Ireland, Scotland, and the Netherlands but postponed due to the COVID-19 pandemic before being revived in 2025. The franchise is owned by a consortium led by former New Zealand internationals Kyle Mills and Nathan McCullum. Mills and McCullum have also forged a strategic partnership with Otago Cricket, intended to bring a pipeline of young talent through to the Rockers.

The inaugural season was originally planned for 2025 but was postponed to 2026 following investment delays and shifting commercial priorities. The franchise was officially unveiled in January 2026 at a press conference held in Sydney, alongside the Amsterdam Flames and Belfast Wolves.

=== 2026: Inaugural season ===
The Castle Rockers quickly assembled a strong squad ahead of the inaugural 2026 season, appointing New Zealand international Mitchell Santner as captain and signing experienced fast bowler Trent Boult and English all-rounder Tom Curran. South African all-rounder JJ Smuts, American wicketkeeper-batter Andries Gous, Australian fast bowler Andrew Tye, English batter Laurie Evans, and Samoan all-rounder Sean Solia were also brought in. Scottish internationals Brandon McMullen, Mark Watt, Safyaan Sharif, Finlay McCreath and Jack Jarvis formed the core of the domestic contingent, alongside Irish internationals Ross Adair and Gareth Delany. American fast bowler Rushil Ugarkar and Scottish all-rounder Ollie Jones completed the squad.

Ahead of the inaugural season opener, the team announced it would be led by New Zealand skipper Mitchell Santner and coached by Trevor Bayliss.

Edinburgh began their inaugural campaign with a 7-wicket win over Glasgow Cosmic a no-result against Amsterdam Flames due to rain in their second game a 4-wicket win over Dublin Guardians a 59-runs win over Belfast Wolves – courtesy of JJ Smuts’s mammoth 98 and Tom Curran’s historic hat-trick a 55-runs win over Rotterdam Dockers a 7-wicket victory over Glasgow Cosmic

The ETPL is heading to Malahide Cricket Ground in Malahide, Ireland and the second half is ready to begin. Edinburgh continued their unbeaten run in the ETPL with a hard-fought 12-run victory over Dublin Guardians a 8-wicket defeat to Amsterdam Flames – ended Edinburgh’s incredible unbeaten streak. a 5-runs defeat to Rotterdam Dockers Edinburgh completed their league campaign with a 9-run DLS defeat to Belfast Wolves. Edinburgh advance directly to the final. In the final, Edinburgh Castle Rockers defeated Belfast Wolves by 7 wickets to win the inaugural title.

== Players ==
=== Squad ===
The Castle Rockers moved swiftly to secure high-profile international talent ahead of the inaugural season. On 21 January 2026, the franchise announced the signing of current New Zealand white-ball captain Mitchell Santner as team captain. Santner, a left-arm spin-bowling all-rounder with over 100 T20 international appearances, was unveiled as the franchise's inaugural captain at the Sydney launch event.

The franchise also secured the services of fellow New Zealand fast bowler Trent Boult, reinforcing a strong New Zealand influence across the squad. Additional confirmed overseas signings include English batting all-rounder Liam Livingstone, Scottish all-rounder Brandon McMullen, New Zealand batter Tom Bruce, American wicket-keeper Andries Gous, and UAE fast bowler Khuzaima Tanveer.

In May 2026, former England international wicket-keeper James Foster was appointed as head coach of the franchise. Foster brings extensive global franchise coaching experience, having worked in the Indian Premier League, Pakistan Super League, Big Bash League, and as head coach of Desert Vipers in the International League T20.

=== Draft acquisitions ===
The ETPL Player Draft took place on 2 July 2026, with all six franchises selecting local players from associate nations through a snake-draft format. Each franchise was required to select a minimum of six and a maximum of eight players from the draft pool, with salaries ranging from $20,000 to $55,000 depending on draft position. Scottish international Finlay McCreath was among the local players selected by the Castle Rockers during the draft.

== Current squad ==
- Players with international caps are listed in **bold**.

Edinburgh Castle Rockers 2026
No.	Name	Nationality	Birth date	Batting style	Bowling style	Notes
Batsmen
—	**Ross Adair**	Ireland	21 April 1994 (age 32)	Right-handed	Slow left-arm orthodox	
—	Laurie Evans	England	12 October 1987 (age 38)	Right-handed	Right-arm off break	
—	**Finlay McCreath**	Scotland	16 October 1998 (age 27)	Right-handed	—	
All-rounders
—	**Gareth Delany**	Ireland	28 April 1997 (age 29)	Right-handed	Leg break googly	
—	**Brandon McMullen**	Scotland	18 October 1999 (age 26)	Right-handed	Right-arm medium	
—	**JJ Smuts**	Italy	21 September 1988 (age 38)	Right-handed	Slow left-arm orthodox	
—	**Sean Solia**	Samoa	12 February 1995 (age 31)	Left-handed	Right-arm medium-fast	
—	**Tom Curran**	England	12 March 1995 (age 31)	Right-handed	Right-arm fast-medium	
—	**Mitchell Santner**	New Zealand	5 February 1992 (age 34)	Left-handed	Slow left-arm orthodox	Captain
Wicket-keepers
—	**Andries Gous**	United States	24 November 1993 (age 32)	Right-handed	—	Wicket-keeper
Bowlers
—	**Andrew Tye**	Australia	12 December 1986 (age 39)	Right-handed	Right-arm fast	
—	**Trent Boult**	New Zealand	22 July 1989 (age 37)	Right-handed	Left-arm fast-medium	
—	**Mark Watt**	Scotland	29 July 1996 (age 30)	Left-handed	Slow left-arm orthodox	
—	**Safyaan Sharif**	Scotland	24 August 1991 (age 35)	Right-handed	Right-arm medium-fast	
—	**Jack Jarvis**	Scotland	31 July 2000 (age 26)	Right-handed	Right-arm medium-fast	
—	**Rushil Ugarkar**	United States	30 June 2003 (age 23)	Right-handed	Right-arm fast-medium	
—	**Ollie Jones**	Scotland	4 June 2001 (age 25)	Right-handed	Right-arm medium-fast	

== Seasons ==
=== Summaries ===
Season	W–L	Pos.	Finals	Coach	Captain	Most runs	Most wickets	Refs
2026	6–3	1st	C	Trevor Bayliss	Mitchell Santner	Brandon McMullen (356)	Tom Curran (17)	

=== Tournament finishes ===
Year	League standing	Final standing
2026	1st out of 6	Champions

- C: champions
- RU: runner-up
- SF team qualified for the semi-final stage of the competition

=== Statistics ===
Year	Played	Wins	Losses	Tied/NR (Note: NR indicates "no result"; abandoned matches are indicated as no result.)
2026	11	7	3	1

== Administration and support staff ==
Position	Name
Co-owner & Ceo	Kyle Mills
Co-owner	Nathan McCullum
Head coach	Trevor Bayliss
Fielding Coach	Gordon Drummond
Bowling Coach	Azhar Mahmood
Captain	Mitchell Santner
Team Manager	Kenny Crichton
Physiotherapist	Gary Metcalfe
