= Matt Hollard =

Irish cricketer

Personal information
- Full name: Matthew Kyle Hollard
- Born: 14 April 1999 (age 27); Boksburg, South Africa
- Batting: Right-handed
- Bowling: Right-arm medium-fast
- Role: Bowler

International information
- National side: Ireland
- T20I debut (cap 63): 26 June 2026 v India
- Last T20I: 28 June 2026 v India

Domestic team information
- Years: Team
- 2025–present: Leinster Lightning
- 2025/26: Limpopo
- 2026: Dublin Guardians

Career statistics
Competition	T20I	FC	LA	T20
Matches	2	5	4	25
Runs scored	–	39	11	81
Batting average	–	7.80	11.00	20.25
100s/50s	–/–	0/0	0/0	0/0
Top score	–	16	11	18
Balls bowled	48	591	170	453
Wickets	6	9	12	31
Bowling average	9.00	42.66	15.16	23.70
5 wickets in innings	0	0	2	0
10 wickets in match	0	0	0	0
Best bowling	3/26	4/91	5/62	3/26
Catches/stumpings	1/–	1/–	0/–	7/–
- Source: Cricinfo, 25 September 2026

Matthew Kyle Hollard (born 14 April 1999) is a South African-born Irish cricketer. Hollard is a right-handed batsman who bowls right-arm medium-fast. He was born in Boksburg, South Africa.

By 2024, Hollard was playing club cricket in Ireland for Balbriggan. In 2025, Cricket Leinster named him in Leinster Lightning squads for the inter-provincial season. In the Inter-Provincial Limited Over Cup that season, he took 5 wickets for 62 runs against the Northern Knights, earning the player-of-the-match award. He also helped Balbriggan win its first Irish Senior Cup, taking the final wicket in the victory over Leinster.

Hollard also played first-class cricket in South Africa for Limpopo, making his debut against Easterns in September 2025. In May 2026, Cricket Ireland named him in the Raiders squad for the Emerald Challenge, a first-class fixture used as part of the senior side's preparation for the home Test against New Zealand. In March 2026, Cricket Ireland awarded him a central contract due to his domestic performances.

In June 2026, Hollard received his first senior Ireland call-up for the Twenty20 International series against India. He made his T20I debut at Stormont on 26 June 2026 and was named player of the match after taking 3 wickets for 28 runs, including the dismissals of Ishan Kishan and Shreyas Iyer, as Ireland recorded their first ever win over India in any format.
