= Amsterdam Flames =

Amsterdam-based cricket franchise in European T20 Premier League (ETPL)

- Official logo of Amsterdam Flames
- Nickname: The Flames
- League: European T20 Premier League

Personnel
- Captain: ~~Mitchell Marsh~~; Scott Edwards
- Coach: Ryan Cook
- Owner: Steve Waugh, Jamie Dwyer, Tim Thomas

Team information
- City: Amsterdam, Netherlands
- Colours: Orange, black, white
- Founded: January 21, 2026; 7 months ago

History
- ETPL wins: 0
- Official website: amsterdamflames.com
T20 kit

The Amsterdam Flames are a professional Twenty20 franchise cricket team based in Amsterdam, Netherlands. They compete in the European T20 Premier League (ETPL).

The team was announced in 2026 as one of six inaugural franchises to play in the league. The Flames are owned by former Australian cricketer Steve Waugh, Jamie Dwyer, and Australian businessman Tim Thomas. The team is coached by Ryan Cook and is captained by Mitchell Marsh.

== History ==
=== Formation and ownership ===
The Amsterdam Flames were established as part of the inaugural European T20 Premier League, a competition first conceived in 2019 by the cricket boards of Ireland, Scotland, and the Netherlands but postponed due to the COVID-19 pandemic before being revived in 2025. The franchise is owned by a consortium led by former Australian captain and two-time World Cup winner Steve Waugh, who serves as co-owner and chief cricket officer. The ownership group also includes five-time Olympian and former Kookaburras captain Jamie Dwyer, who brings high-performance expertise from his decorated field hockey career, and Australian businessman Tim Thomas.

Waugh's involvement marks his first serious engagement with professional cricket since retiring from international cricket over two decades prior. In an interview with sports news website Cricinfo, Waugh described Europe as cricket's "last great frontier," stating, "To me, Europe is the last frontier of cricket, and that's why I'm involved." The franchises were reportedly sold for approximately £11.1 million (INR 1,39,63,68,000) over a ten-year period.

The inaugural season was originally planned for 2025 but was postponed to 2026 following investment delays and shifting commercial priorities, including investor focus on other franchise competitions such as The Hundred.

=== 2026: Inaugural season ===
The Flames quickly assembled their squad ahead of the inaugural 2026 season, signing Australian T20I captain Mitchell Marsh as captain, alongside Steve Smith and Tim David. Netherlands captain Scott Edwards, Dutch all-rounder Bas de Leede, English seamers David Payne and Richard Gleeson, and New Zealand all-rounder Michael Bracewell were also signed. Former India captain Ajinkya Rahane later joined the squad to strengthen the batting.

The Flames, in the 2 July 2026 ETPL Player Draft, selected Dutch internationals Max O'Dowd, Aryan Dutt, Tim Pringle, and Kyle Klein. Irish all-rounder Curtis Campher and Jordan Neill were also picked up by the team during the draft.

Ahead of the inaugural season opener, the team announced it would be led by Australian Mitchell Marsh but has reportedly pulled out to prioritise Australia's upcoming white-ball series against Zimbabwe and South Africa. Former Netherlands skipper Scott Edwards will take over from Marsh as Amsterdam captain. The team will be coached by Ryan Cook.

Amsterdam began their inaugural campaign with a 5-wicket defeat to Rotterdam Dockers a no-result against Edinburgh Castle Rockers due to rain in their second game In a rain-affected game, a heavy 9-wicket defeat to Belfast Wolves in their third game a convincing 7-wicket victory over Glasgow Cosmic a 9-run win over Dublin Guardians a 8-wicket win over Rotterdam Dockers

The ETPL is heading to Malahide Cricket Ground in Malahide, Ireland and the second half is ready to begin. a 5-wicket defeat to Belfast Wolves a 8-wicket win over Edinburgh Castle Rockers a 59-runs win over Dublin Guardians Amsterdam completed their league campaign with a 5-wicket victory over Glasgow Cosmic. After shooting up to a 2nd-place group stage finish heading into the playoffs, in the Qualifier a 7-wicket defeat to Belfast Wolves. Amsterdam campaign ends in the qualifier.

== Players ==
=== Squad ===
The Flames moved swiftly to secure high-profile international talent ahead of the inaugural season. On 21 January 2026, the franchise announced the signings of current Australian T20I captain Mitchell Marsh as team captain, alongside former Australian captain Steve Smith and explosive batter Tim David. Waugh expressed his enthusiasm for Marsh's appointment, stating, "I am really excited to sign Mitchell Marsh as our captain for our initial couple of seasons. He is a fantastic leader and T20 captain of Australia."

The franchise also secured the services of Netherlands captain Scott Edwards, a wicket-keeper batter who provides crucial local expertise and leadership within the squad. In June 2026, Dutch all-rounder Bas de Leede was announced as the franchise's fifth signing, returning to his home country's domestic circuit after playing internationally. Additional confirmed signings include English left-arm seamer David Payne, New Zealand all-rounder Michael Bracewell, and English fast bowler Richard Gleeson, bolstering the team's bowling attack. Ajinkya Rahane was also signed to reinforce the top-order batting.

=== Draft acquisitions ===
The ETPL Player Draft took place on 2 July 2026, with all six franchises selecting local players from associate nations through a snake-draft format. Each franchise was required to select a minimum of six and a maximum of eight players from the draft pool, with salaries ranging from $20,000 to $55,000 depending on draft position.

Dutch internationals Max O'Dowd, Aryan Dutt, Tim Pringle, Kyle Klein, alongside Irish all-rounder Curtis Campher and Jordan Neill were selected by the Flames during the draft.

== Current squad ==
- Players with international caps are listed in **bold**.

Amsterdam Flames roster
Name	Nat.	Batting style	Bowling style	Year signed	Notes
Batters
**Steve Smith**	Australia	Right-handed	Right-arm leg spin	2026	
**Tim David**	Australia	Right-handed	Right-arm off break	2026	
**Max O'Dowd**	Netherlands	Right-handed		2026	
**Ajinkya Rahane**	India	Right-handed	Right-arm off break	2026	
**Yuvraj Samra**	Canada	Right-handed		2026	
All-rounders
**Mitchell Marsh** (c)	Australia	Right-handed	Right-arm medium-fast	2026	
**Michael Bracewell**	New Zealand	Left-handed	Right-arm off break	2026	
**Curtis Campher**	Ireland	Right-handed	Right-arm medium	2026	
**Dipendra Singh Airee**	Nepal	Right-handed	Right-arm off break	2026	
**Bas de Leede**	Netherlands	Right-handed	Right-arm medium-fast	2026	
**Aryan Dutt**	Netherlands	Right-handed	Right-arm off break	2026	
**Tim Pringle**	Netherlands	Left-handed	Slow left-arm orthodox	2026	
Wicket-keeper
**Scott Edwards** (wk)	Netherlands	Right-handed		2026	
Bowlers
**Richard Gleeson**	England	Right-handed	Right-arm fast	2026	
**Ali Hassan**	Italy	Right-handed	Right-arm fast-medium	2026	
**Kyle Klein**	Netherlands	Right-handed	Right-arm fast-medium	2026	
**Jordan Neill**	Ireland	Right-handed	Right-arm medium-fast	2026	
**David Payne**	England	Left-handed	Left-arm fast-medium	2026	

== Administration and support staff ==
Amsterdam Flames staff
Position	Name
Co-owner & chief officer	Steve Waugh
Co-owner	Jamie Dwyer
Co-owner	Tim Thomas
Head coach	Ryan Cook
Assistant coach	JP Duminy
Assistant coach	John Davison
Captain	Mitchell Marsh

== Seasons ==
=== Summaries ===
Season	W–L	Pos.	Finals	Coach	Captain	Most runs	Most wickets	Refs
2026	6–3	2nd	Q	Ryan Cook	Scott Edwards	Bas de Leede (320)	Michael Bracewell (19)	

=== Tournament finishes ===
Year	League standing	Final standing
2026	2nd out of 6	Qualifier

- C: Champions
- RU: Runner-up
- Q: Team qualified for the Playoffs stage of the competition

=== Statistics ===
Year	Played	Wins	Losses	Tied/NR (Note: NR indicates "no result"; abandoned matches are indicated as no result.)
2026	11	6	4	1

== See also ==
- European T20 Premier League
- Rotterdam Dockers
