= Chris Wood (cricketer) =

English cricketer

Personal information
- Full name: Christopher Philip Wood
- Born: 27 June 1990 (age 36); Basingstoke, Hampshire, England
- Batting: Right-handed
- Bowling: Left-arm medium

Domestic team information
- Years: Team
- 2010–present: Hampshire (squad no. 25)
- 2021–2023: London Spirit
- 2024–present: Birmingham Phoenix
- 2025/26: Gulf Giants
- 2026: Dublin Guardians
- First-class debut: 15 April 2010 Hampshire v Oxford MCCU
- List A debut: 14 May 2010 Hampshire v Warwickshire

Career statistics
Competition	FC	LA	T20
Matches	43	79	251
Runs scored	1,326	400	625
Batting average	23.67	12.90	11.57
100s/50s	1/6	0/0	0/0
Top score	105*	41	31
Balls bowled	6,169	3,304	5,074
Wickets	105	105	270
Bowling average	30.22	28.22	25.74
5 wickets in innings	3	2	1
10 wickets in match	0	0	0
Best bowling	5/39	5/22	5/32
Catches/stumpings	14/–	24/–	55/–
- Source: Cricinfo, 25 September 2026

Christopher Philip Wood (born 27 June 1990) is an English first-class cricketer.

He currently plays for Hampshire. Wood is a right-handed batsman who bowls left-arm medium pace.

Wood has represented the England U-19 cricket team, playing two Youth Test matches, nine Youth One Day Internationals, and a single Youth Twenty20 International.

Wood made his first-class debut for Hampshire against Oxford University at University Parks, Oxford in the 2010 English cricket season. During the match, Wood took his maiden five wicket haul with figures of 5/54. He made his List-A debut against Warwickshire on 14 May in the 2010 Clydesdale Bank 40.

Wood scored his second first-class fifty against Worcestershire at New Road on 12/09/13. He shared an 81 run seventh wicket partnership with youngster Sean Terry. He has taken the most wickets in T20 matches by a player who has only played T20 cricket for one team.

As a youngster Wood was a talented sportsman, playing as a striker for the Manor Colts football team in Alton, Hampshire.

Wood attended Amery Hill School and Alton College. Wood has spoken about his addiction to gambling.

He is married to Lucy, the daughter of Rod Bransgrove. Early in 2020, Lucy gave birth to Isabella.

In April 2022, he was bought by the London Spirit for the 2022 season of The Hundred.
