= Sportpark Westvliet =

Sports venue

Coordinates: 52°04′07″N 04°22′28″E

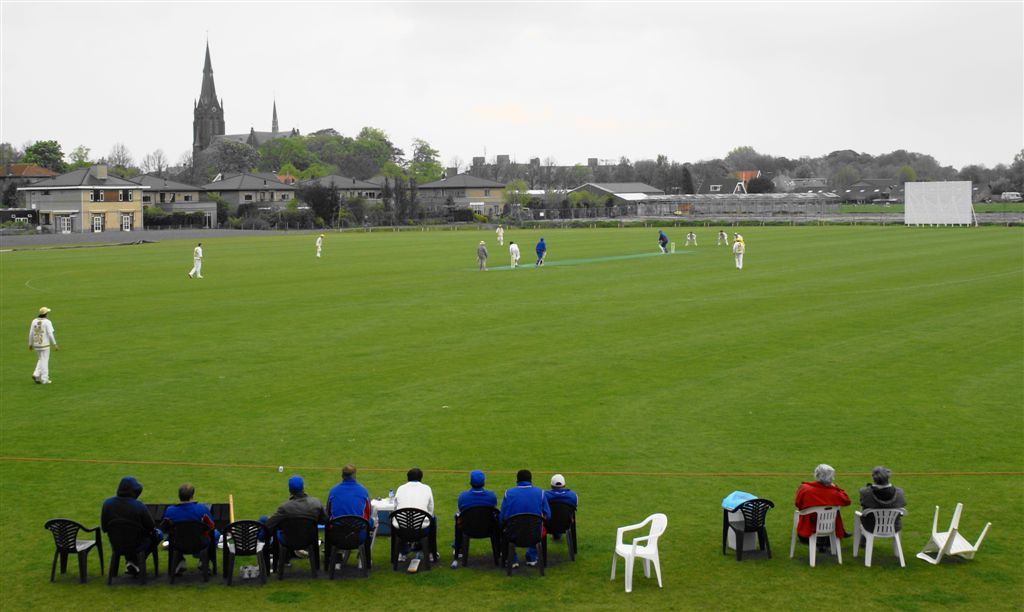
- Interactive map of Sportpark Westvliet

Ground information
- Location: The Hague, Netherlands
- Country: Netherlands
- Establishment: 2006; 20 years ago
- Tenants: Voorburg Cricket Club; VV Wilhelmus
- End names
- Pavilion End; Paddock End

International information
- First men's ODI: 1 July 2010: Afghanistan v Canada
- Last men's ODI: 15 August 2024: Netherlands v United States
- First men's T20I: 24 July 2012: Bangladesh v Scotland
- Last men's T20I: 11 July 2025: Netherlands v Italy
- Only women's ODI: 26 August 2022: Netherlands v Ireland
- First women's T20I: 30 June 2022: Netherlands v Namibia
- Last women's T20I: 1 July 2022: Netherlands v Namibia
- As of 28 August 2024; Source: Cricinfo

Sportpark Westvliet is a multi-sports park located in The Hague, Netherlands. The sports park is situated on the border with Voorburg and is therefore administered by the Leidschendam-Voorburg municipality. Among others, it contains the grounds of VV Wilhelmus, Voorburgse Rugby Club and the Voorburg Cricket Club.

== Cricket ==
The first recorded match on the ground came in 2010 when Afghanistan played Scotland in a warm-up match for the 2010 World Cricket League Division One, which the Netherlands hosted. Despite having a boundary which is too short on one side, which is contrary to International Cricket Council regulation, the ground was nevertheless approved to hold One Day Internationals during the World Cricket League tournament. The first One Day International saw Afghanistan play Canada. Three further One Day Internationals were played there, however a further two matches were scheduled to be held there but were moved due to the pitch being deemed unsatisfactory. One Day International cricket returned to the ground in 2011 when the Netherlands played Kenya in the 2011–13 ICC Intercontinental Cup One-Day.

The ground is used by Voorburg Cricket Club, who previously played at Sportpark Duivesteijn and moved grounds in 2006, first playing at a reserve ground, before moving to Sportpark Westvliet in 2007. In 2026, the ground hosted 15 matches of the inaugural season of the European T20 Premier League.

=== One Day International centuries ===
The following table summarises the One Day International centuries scored at Sportpark Westvliet

No.	Score	Player	Team	Balls	Opposing team	Date	Result
1	101	Tom Cooper	Netherlands	155	Afghanistan	7 July 2010	Lost

=== T20 International centuries ===
The following table summarises the T20 International centuries scored at Sportpark Westvliet

No.	Score	Player	Team	Balls	Opposing team	Date	Result
1	100	Richie Berrington	Scotland	58	Bangladesh	24 July 2012	Won
