= David Payne (cricketer) =

English cricketer

Personal information
- Full name: David Alan Payne
- Born: 15 February 1991 (age 35); Poole, Dorset, England
- Batting: Right-handed
- Bowling: Left-arm fast-medium
- Role: Bowler

International information
- National side: England
- Only ODI (cap 264): 22 June 2022 v Netherlands

Domestic team information
- Years: Team
- 2009–: Gloucestershire (squad no. 14)
- 2021–2025: Welsh Fire (squad no. 7)
- 2022/23: Perth Scorchers
- 2023/24: Adelaide Strikers
- 2025–2025/26: Desert Vipers
- 2025/26: Perth Scorchers
- 2026: Sunrisers Hyderabad
- 2026: Amsterdam Flames

Career statistics
Competition	ODI	FC	LA	T20
Matches	1	115	70	242
Runs scored	–	1,779	222	298
Batting average	–	18.72	20.18	6.93
100s/50s	–/–	0/6	0/0	0/0
Top score	–	67*	40	28
Balls bowled	54	18,791	3,074	4,973
Wickets	1	328	115	313
Bowling average	38.00	29.58	25.46	21.37
5 wickets in innings	0	6	3	1
10 wickets in match	0	1	0	0
Best bowling	1/38	6/26	7/29	5/24
Catches/stumpings	0/–	40/–	20/–	55/–
- Source: Cricinfo, 25 September 2026

David Alan Payne (born 15 February 1991) is an English cricketer who made his debut for Gloucestershire in 2009. A left-arm fast-medium bowler, he has represented England at U-19 level in both Test matches and One Day Internationals. He was named as part of the squad for the 2010 U-19 Cricket World Cup. Since his debut for Gloucestershire, he has become a key part of their bowling attack and often opened, and has also showed promise with the bat, by scoring his maiden First Class half-century at the end of the 2011 season. Payne made his international debut for the England cricket team in June 2022.

== Career ==
Payne took a career best of 7–29 in the 2010 Clydesdale Bank 40 group match against Essex at Chelmsford in 2010. He dismissed James Foster, Grant Flower, Tim Phillips and Jaik Mickleburgh in just 4 balls, having previously dismissed Graham Napier just 2 balls before.

In July 2021, Payne was named in England's One Day International (ODI) squad for their series against Pakistan, after the original squad for the tour was forced to withdraw following positive tests for COVID-19. In December 2021, Payne was named in England's Twenty20 International (T20I) squad for their series against the West Indies.

In April 2022, he was bought by the Welsh Fire for the 2022 season of The Hundred. The following month, Payne was named in England's ODI squad for their series against the Netherlands. Payne made his ODI debut on 22 June 2022, for England against the Netherlands.

In March 2026, Payne was signed by Sunrisers Hyderabad to play for them in the Indian Premier League, as a replacement for Jack Edwards who was unable to represent them due to injury.
