= Roland Black =

Cricket umpire

Personal information
- Full name: Roland Black
- Born: 22 July 1971 (age 55); Derry, Northern Ireland

Umpiring information
- ODIs umpired: 37 (2016–2025)
- T20Is umpired: 46 (2016–2026)
- WODIs umpired: 7 (2018–2025)
- WT20Is umpired: 19 (2016–2025)
- Source: Cricinfo, 22 June 2023

Roland Black (born 22 July 1971) is a Northern Irish cricket umpire. He has been an umpire since 2006. His name was added to ICC Associate and Affiliate Umpires Panel in 2016.

On 14 July 2016, he stood in his first One Day International (ODI) match, between Ireland and Afghanistan. He was initially appointed to stand in the match between the two sides on 10 July, but the match was abandoned due to rain without a ball being bowled. On 5 September 2016, he stood in his first Twenty20 International match, between Ireland and Hong Kong.

On 30 May 2017, he was one of the two on-field umpires for the 2017 Inter-Provincial Championship match between Northern Knights and North West Warriors. This was the maiden first-class match in the Inter-Provincial Championship.

In April 2019, he was one of four umpires awarded a full-time season contract by Cricket Ireland, the first time that Cricket Ireland had offered such contracts to umpires. He was one of the twelve umpires to officiate matches in the 2019 ICC T20 World Cup Qualifier tournament in the United Arab Emirates. In January 2020, he was named as one of the sixteen umpires for the 2020 Under-19 Cricket World Cup tournament in South Africa. In January 2022, he was named as one of the on-field umpires for the 2022 ICC Under-19 Cricket World Cup in the West Indies. He was also one of the two on-field umpires for the final of the tournament. In May 2022, Black was part of an umpire exchange initiative with the England and Wales Cricket Board (ECB).

== See also ==
- List of One Day International cricket umpires
- List of Twenty20 International cricket umpires
