= David McLean (umpire) =

Scottish cricket umpire

Personal information
- Full name: David McLean
- Born: 22 August 1976 (age 50); Aberdeen, Scotland
- Role: Umpire

Umpiring information
- ODIs umpired: 18 (2019–2025)
- T20Is umpired: 25 (2019–2025)
- WT20Is umpired: 16 (2021–2025)
- Source: ESPN Cricinfo, 17 August 2022

David McLean is a Scottish advocate and cricket umpire. He is a member of the Development Panel of ICC Umpires. McLean played as a wicket-keeper in local domestic cricket in Scotland, becoming an umpire in 2014. He stood in his first One Day International (ODI) match, between Scotland and Sri Lanka, on 21 May 2019. He stood in his first Twenty20 International (T20I) match, between Scotland and the Netherlands, on 16 September 2019.

He was one of the on-field umpires for the 2022 ICC Under-19 Cricket World Cup in the West Indies.

== See also ==
- List of One Day International cricket umpires
- List of Twenty20 International cricket umpires
