= European T20 Premier League =

European Twenty20 cricket league

- Countries: Ireland; Northern Ireland; Netherlands; Scotland
- Format: T20 cricket
- First edition: 2026
- Latest edition: 2026
- Next edition: 2027
- Tournament format: Round-robin league and playoffs
- Number of teams: 6
- Current champion: Edinburgh Castle Rockers
- Most successful: Edinburgh Castle Rockers (1 titles)
- Most runs: Faf du Plessis (449)
- Most wickets: Michael Bracewell (19)
- Website: etplofficial.com

The European T20 Premier League (ETPL) is a franchise Twenty20 cricket league in Europe. It comprises six franchise teams, representing major cities in Ireland, Northern Ireland, Netherlands, and Scotland. The ICC-sanctioned league was co-founded by Indian actor and sports entrepreneur Abhishek Bachchan and three other Indian investors, in a strategic partnership with Cricket Scotland, Cricket Ireland, and Royal Dutch Cricket Association.

== History ==
=== Euro T20 Slam ===
In March 2019, Cricket Scotland, Cricket Ireland and the Royal Dutch Cricket Association officially announced a sanctioned cross-border European Twenty20 professional franchise tournament, the Euro T20 Slam, originally for six teams. The initial player draft was held. The organiser, which was also responsible for the Canadian Global T20 tournament, announced a number of postponements as a combination of organisational issues and the COVID-19 pandemic effectively rendered the tournament abandoned.

=== European T20 Premier League ===
In January 2025, it was confirmed that a broadly similar venture with the same boards and six initial teams, had received the International Cricket Council's sanction to begin play in July 2025, effectively rebranding the T20 Slam as European T20 Premier League. The event avoids most of the southern hemisphere and Caribbean franchise tournaments, including the Indian Premier League. Bollywood entertainer Abhishek Bachchan was announced as part owner of the league, at the same time as its sanctioning. In June 2025, the European T20 Premier League was postponed from its planned July–August 2025, The tournament had originally been scheduled to take place from 15 July to 3 August 2025, but the franchise ownership process was not completed in time. Potential investors were reportedly focused on opportunities to acquire stakes in teams in The Hundred. In August 2025, the ETPL appointed Oakvale Capital as its exclusive investment banker to raise capital for the competition. The league remained backed by Cricket Ireland, Cricket Scotland and the Royal Dutch Cricket Association, with Abhishek Bachchan among its investors.

In January 2026 ETPL announced its first three franchise ownership groups. Former Australia captain Steve Waugh became part of the ownership group behind the Amsterdam franchise while former New Zealand internationals Nathan McCullum and Kyle Mills were involved with the Edinburgh franchise Glenn Maxwell was also announced as a co-owner of the Belfast franchise Later, Chris Gayle joined the Glasgow franchise while Faf du Plessis, Jonty Rhodes and Heinrich Klaasen became co-owners of Rotterdam Dockers. In May 2026, Rahul Dravid was announced as owner of the Dublin Guardians, completing the league's six-team structure.

The inaugural season will be played from 26 August to 20 September 2026.

== Format ==
The ETPL is played in a double round-robin format, where each team faces the other twice during the league stage. The top three teams at the end of the group stage qualify for the playoffs, with the first placed team proceeding directly to the final while the second and third placed teams contest a qualifier semi-final.

In the group stage, teams are awarded two points for a win, one point for a no-result, and zero points for a loss. If a match ends in a tie, a super over is used to decide the winner. If the Super over is tied, up to two subsequent super overs may be played.

Teams in the league stage are ranked based on:

1. Higher number of points
2. If equal, best net run rate
3. If equal, most wickets taken per fair balls bowled in complete matches
4. If still equal, by drawing of lots

In the playoffs, if a super over cannot be played or two subsequent super overs also ends in a tie, the team that finished higher in the league stage is declared the winner.

== Teams ==
=== Current ===
In January 2025, the six represented cities were announced. On 21 January, the ETPL announced the first three franchise owners, Amsterdam Flames, Edinburgh Castle Rockers, and Belfast Wolves. On 20 April, Glasgow Mugafians was announced as one of the franchises. On 28 April, the franchise rebranded to Glasgow Cosmic. On 30 April, Jonty Rhodes, Faf du Plessis, and Heinrich Klaasen were announced as the owners of Rotterdam Dockers. On 11 May, the final team was announced as the Dublin Guardians, with Rahul Dravid led consortium as their owners.

Team	City	Debut	Captain	Head coach	Owner(s)
Amsterdam Flames	(Netherlands) Amsterdam	2026	Scott Edwards	Ryan Cook	Steve Waugh; Jamie Dwyer; Tim Thomas
Belfast Wolves	(Northern Ireland) Belfast	2026	Glenn Maxwell	Kevin O'Brien	Rohan Lund; Glenn Maxwell
Dublin Guardians	(Republic of Ireland) Dublin	2026	Ravichandran Ashwin	Rahul Dravid	Rahul Dravid
Edinburgh Castle Rockers	(Scotland) Edinburgh	2026	Mitchell Santner	James Foster	Nathan McCullum; Kyle Mills
Glasgow Cosmic	(Scotland) Glasgow	2026	George Munsey	Matthew Hayden	Matthew Hayden; Tansha Batra; Mugafi Group
Rotterdam Dockers	(Netherlands) Rotterdam	2026	Faf du Plessis	Adrian Birrell	Jonty Rhodes; Faf du Plessis; Heinrich Klaasen; John Abraham

== Seasons and results ==
Season	Final				No. of teams	Player of the series
Season	Winner	Result	Runners-up	Venue	No. of teams	Player of the series
2026	Edinburgh Castle Rockers	Edinburgh Castle Rockers won by 7 wickets Scorecard	Belfast Wolves	(Republic of Ireland); Malahide Cricket Ground, Malahide	6	Faf du Plessis (Rotterdam Dockers)

== Team performances ==
Seasons Teams	2026
Amsterdam Flames	3rd
Belfast Wolves	RU
Dublin Guardians	5th
Edinburgh Castle Rockers	C
Glasgow Cosmic	6th
Rotterdam Dockers	4th

- C: Champions
- RU: Runner-up
- 3rd: Team lost the Qualifiers place in playoff

== Records and statistics ==
Batting
Most runs	Faf du Plessis	449
Highest score	James Vince	106*
Highest partnership	Bass de lesse & Tim David	113* vs Rotterdam Dockers (6 September 2026)
Bowling
Most wickets	Michael Bracewell	19
Best bowling figures	Michael Bracewell	5/19 (4)
Fielding
Most dismissals (wicket-keeper)	Heinrich Klaasen	10
Most catches (fielder)	Faf du Plessis	9
Team
Highest team total	Amsterdam Flames	214/5 (20) vs Dublin Guardians
Lowest team total	Rotterdam Dockers	93 vs Edinburgh Castle Rockers

As of 20 September 2026

== Broadcasting ==
The 2026 season of the European T20 Premier League will be broadcast live on the following channels.

Region(s)/countries	Television rights	Streaming rights
Indian subcontinent	Star Sports	JioHotstar
United Kingdom	TNT Sports	HBO Max
Ireland	TNT Sports	HBO Max
Australia	Foxtel	Kayo Sports
Caribbean	Rush Sports	Rush Live & Louder
United States	Willow	Cricbuzz
Canada	Willow	Cricbuzz
Middle East and North Africa	—N/a	Cricbuzz
Southeast Asia	—N/a	Cricbuzz
South Africa	—N/a	Olympic Channel
New Zealand	—N/a	Olympic Channel
Netherlands	—N/a	Olympic Channel
