= Nitin Bathi =

Cricket umpire

Personal information
- Born: 17 July 1986 (age 40); Davanagere, Karnataka, India
- Role: Umpire

Umpiring information
- ODIs umpired: 17 (2021–2025)
- T20Is umpired: 33 (2021–2024)
- WODIs umpired: 2
- WT20Is umpired: 8
- Source: ESPNcricinfo, 17 January 2026

Nitin Bathi (born 17 July 1986) is an Indian-born Dutch cricket umpire. He made his One Day International umpire debut in the match between the Netherlands and Scotland games on 19 May 2021. Made his T20I umpire debut in the match between Denmark and Italy in the ICC Men's T20 World Cup Europe Region Qualifier on 16 October 2021.

On 1 February 2026, he was named on-field umpire for the ICC Women’s U19 Women’s T20 World Cup 2025 final between India and South Africa.

== See also ==
- List of One Day International cricket umpires
- List of Twenty20 International cricket umpires
