= Dublin Guardians =

Dublin based franchise cricket team in European T20 Premier League (ETPL)

- Official logo of Dublin Guardians
- Nickname: The Guardians
- League: European T20 Premier League

Personnel
- Captain: Ravichandran Ashwin
- Coach: Vikram Rathour
- Owner: Rahul Dravid

Team information
- City: Dublin, Ireland
- Colours: Emerald Green, Gold, White, Navy Blue
- Founded: 11 May 2026; 6 months ago

History
- ETPL wins: 0

The Dublin Guardians are a professional Twenty20 cricket franchise team based in Dublin, Ireland, competing in the European T20 Premier League (ETPL). The Guardians were announced as one of the league's inaugural franchises on 11 May 2026. The franchise is owned by former Indian captain and T20 World Cup-winning coach Rahul Dravid, who acquired a primary stake. Former Indian offspinner Ravichandran Ashwin serves as both captain and mentor of the franchise.

== History ==
=== Formation ===
The Dublin Guardians were established as part of the inaugural European T20 Premier League, a competition first conceived in 2019. The franchise was officially unveiled on 11 May 2026 at a landmark event in Dublin, where Rahul Dravid was announced as the owner, completing the league's six-team structure.

=== Captain and mentorship ===
On 1 July 2026, former Indian offspinner Ravichandran Ashwin was appointed as captain and mentor of the franchise. Ashwin, who retired from the Indian Premier League at the end of the 2025 season, joined as one of the tournament's direct signings.

== Players ==
=== Draft acquisitions ===
The inaugural player draft took place on 2 July 2026, with franchises selecting local players from the three organising nations through a snake-draft format. Each franchise was required to select a minimum of six and a maximum of eight players from the draft pool. Dublin Guardians and Belfast Irish Wolves picked seven of the 12 available Irish players. The Guardians selected Irish internationals George Dockrell, Craig Young, Benjamin Calitz, Matthew Hollard alongside Noah Croes, and Chris Greaves.

=== Direct Overseas Signings ===
Daryl Mitchell, James Vince, Vijay Shankar, Harmeet Singh and Sanjay Krishnamurthi.

== Current squad ==
The following players have been confirmed as part of the Dublin Guardians squad for the 2026 European T20 Premier League:

No.	Name	Nationality	Birth date	Batting style	Bowling style	Notes
Batters
—	**Daryl Mitchell**	New Zealand	—	—	—	Overseas player
—	**James Vince**	England	—	—	—	Overseas player
—	**Muhammad Waseem**	United Arab Emirates	—	—	—	Associate player
All-rounders
—	**Ravichandran Ashwin (c)**	India	17 September 1986 (age 40)	Right-handed	Right-arm off break	Mentor; Overseas player
—	**George Dockrell**	Ireland	22 July 1992 (age 34)	Right-handed	Slow left-arm orthodox	Affiliated local player; Drafted
—	**Vijay Shankar**	India	—	—	—	Overseas player
—	**Harmeet Singh**	United States	—	—	—	Associate player
—	**Harry Tector**	Ireland	—	—	—	Affiliated local player
Wicket-keepers
—	**Ben Calitz**	Ireland	6 July 2002 (age 24)	Left-handed	Right-arm medium	Affiliated local player; Drafted
—	**Noah Croes**	Netherlands	—	—	—	Local player; Drafted
Bowlers
—	**Chris Greaves**	Scotland	—	—	—	Local player; Drafted
—	Peter Hatzoglou	Greece	—	—	—	European associate player
—	**Matt Hollard**	Ireland	—	—	—	Affiliated local player; Drafted
—	**Josh Little**	Ireland	—	—	—	Affiliated local player
—	Chris Wood	England	—	—	—	Overseas player
—	**Craig Young**	Ireland	4 April 1990 (age 36)	Right-handed	Right-arm fast-medium	Affiliated local player; Drafted

== Seasons ==
=== Summaries ===
Season	W–L	Pos.	Finals	Coach	Captain	Most Runs	Most Wickets	Refs
2026

=== Tournament finishes ===
Year	League standing	Final standing
2026	5th out of 6	League stage

- C: champions
- RU: runner-up
- SF team qualified for the semi-final stage of the competition

=== Statistics ===
Year	Played	Wins	Losses	Tied/NR (Note: NR indicates "no result"; abandoned matches are indicated as no result.)
2026

== Administration and support staff ==
Position	Name
Owner	Rahul Dravid
Captain	Ravichandran Ashwin
Head coach	Vikram Rathour
Assistant coach	Ed Joyce
Bowling coach	Mitchell McClenaghan
Fielding coach	John Mooney

== See also ==
- European T20 Premier League
- Cricket in Ireland
- Cricket Ireland
- Malahide Cricket Club Ground
- Rahul Dravid
- Ravichandran Ashwin
