= Malahide Cricket Ground =

Cricket ground

The Village
- Malahide Cricket Ground
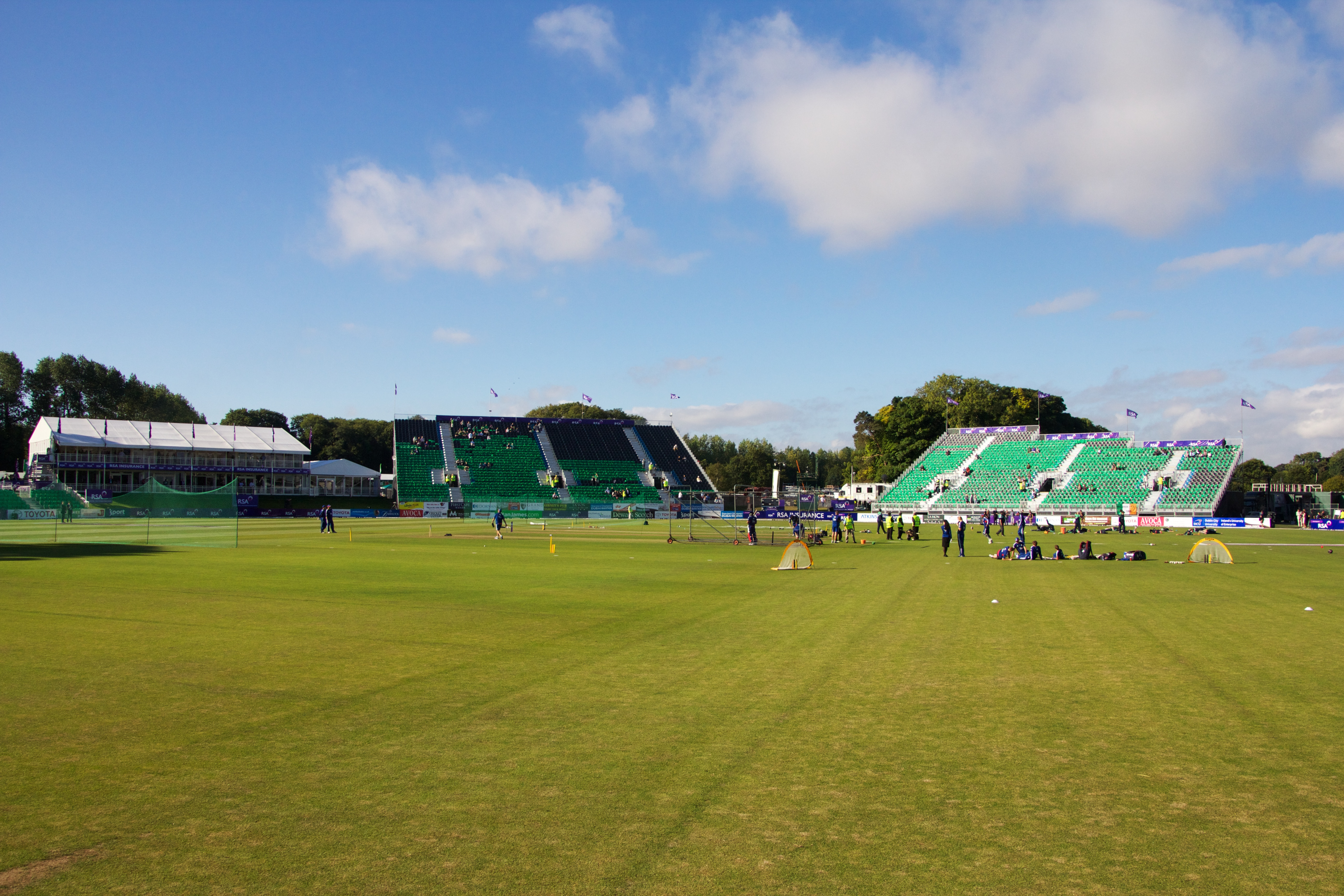
- 2013 ODI between Ireland and England
- Interactive map of The Village

Ground information
- Location: Malahide, Dublin, Ireland
- Country: Ireland
- Coordinates: 53.4493°N 6.1612°W
- Establishment: 1861
- Capacity: 11,500
- Owner: Malahide Cricket Club
- Operator: Cricket Ireland
- Tenants: Ireland Cricket Team
- End names
- Dublin Road End; Castle End

International information
- Only men's Test: 11–15 May 2018: Ireland v Pakistan
- First men's ODI: 3 September 2013: Ireland v England
- Last men's ODI: 15 July 2022: Ireland v New Zealand
- First men's T20I: 17 July 2015: Nepal v Papua New Guinea
- Last men's T20I: 21 September 2025: Ireland v England
- First women's ODI: 3 July 2002: Ireland v New Zealand
- Last women's ODI: 9 August 2016: Ireland v South Africa
- First women's T20I: 28 May 2009: Ireland v Pakistan
- Last women's T20I: 30 July 2021: Ireland v Netherlands
- As of 20 August 2023; Source: ESPNcricinfo

Malahide Cricket Ground or The Village is a cricket ground in Malahide, Ireland, situated in the Lady Acre field of Malahide Castle grounds. The ground is owned by Malahide Cricket Club. The ground has been developed to a capacity of 11,500, making it Ireland's biggest cricket venue; it officially opened for international cricket in 2013. In November 2017, it was confirmed as the venue for Ireland's first men's Test match, when they played Pakistan in May 2018.

== History ==
Malahide Cricket Club was founded in 1861. The 5th Baron Talbot of Malahide, Richard Wogan Talbot, was fond of cricket and established a cricket ground in the grounds of Malahide Castle. Well over a century later, major cricket was first played at Malahide, when the ground hosted a first-class match between Ireland and Scotland in 1991.

=== International cricket ===
In September 2013, International Cricket Council cleared the ground to host international cricket. The ground hosted its first international cricket match when home team Ireland played against England with England winning by six wickets after captain Eoin Morgan hit 124 not out on what had been his home ground in his youth. The capacity was designed to be increased to 11500 using temporary grandstands and hospitality tents making it the biggest in Ireland with a record attendance for the Island of Ireland of over 10,000.

The ground became Ireland's third venue for international cricket, the other two being Castle Avenue (Clontarf) in Dublin and the Civil Service Cricket Club Ground at Stormont. Malahide was also confirmed as the stage for two Twenty20 games against the touring South Africa A team in 2013. It was selected as a venue to host matches in the 2015 ICC World Twenty20 Qualifier tournament. In 2026, it was selected as a venue to host the second phase of the 2026 European T20 Premier League including playoffs and the final.

== Records ==
=== International centuries ===
==== Test centuries ====
In the very first Test match for Ireland, Kevin O'Brien scored the maiden Test century at the venue.

No.	Score	Player	Team	Balls	Inns.	Opposing team	Date	Result
1	118	Kevin O'Brien	Ireland	217	3	Pakistan	11 May 2018	Lost

==== ODI centuries ====
16 ODI centuries have been scored at the venue.

No.	Score	Player	Team	Balls	Opposing team	Date	Result
1	112	William Porterfield	Ireland	142	England	3 September 2013	Lost
2	124*	Eoin Morgan	England	106	Ireland	3 September 2013	Won
3	101*	Ravi Bopara	England	75	Ireland	3 September 2013	Won
4	101*	Richie Berrington	Scotland	126	Ireland	10 September 2014	Won
5	116*	Calum MacLeod	Scotland	141	Ireland	10 September 2014	Won
6	100*	Dinesh Chandimal	Sri Lanka	107	Ireland	16 June 2016	Won
7	135	Kusal Perera	Sri Lanka	128	Ireland	16 June 2016	Won
8	152	Sharjeel Khan	Pakistan	86	Ireland	18 August 2016	Won
9	109	Niall O'Brien	Ireland	131	New Zealand	14 May 2017	Lost
10	104	Tom Latham	New Zealand	111	Ireland	21 May 2017	Won
11	135	Andrew Balbirnie (1/2)	Ireland	124	West Indies	11 May 2019	Lost
12	148	Sunil Ambris	West Indies	126	Ireland	11 May 2019	Won
13	102	Andrew Balbirnie (2/2)	Ireland	117	South Africa	13 July 2021	Won
14	177*	Janneman Malan	South Africa	169	Ireland	16 July 2021	Won
15	120	Quinton de Kock	South Africa	91	Ireland	16 July 2021	Won
16	100*	Simi Singh	Ireland	91	South Africa	16 July 2021	Lost
17	113	Harry Tector	Ireland	117	New Zealand	10 July 2022	Lost
18	127*	Michael Bracewell	New Zealand	82	Ireland	10 July 2022	Won
19	115	Martin Guptill	New Zealand	126	Ireland	15 July 2022	Won
20	120	Paul Stirling	Ireland	103	New Zealand	15 July 2022	Lost
21	108	Harry Tector	Ireland	106	New Zealand	15 July 2022	Lost

==== T20I centuries ====
No.	Score	Player	Team	Balls	Opposing team	Date	Result
1	127*	George Munsey	Scotland	56	Netherlands	16 September 2019	Won
2	104	Deepak Hooda	India	57	Ireland	28 June 2022	Won

=== International five wicket hauls ===
As of 11 January 2020

A total of seven five-wicket hauls have been taken on the ground in international matches, including one in a Test match.

==== Test matches ====
Five-wicket hauls in Men's Test matches at Malahide Cricket Club
No.	Bowler	Date	Team	Opposing Team	Inn	O	R	W	Result
1	Mohammad Abbas	11 May 2018	Pakistan	Ireland	3	28.3	66	5	Pakistan won

==== One Day Internationals ====
Five-wicket hauls in Men's One Day International matches at Malahide Cricket Club
No.	Bowler	Date	Team	Opposing Team	Inn	O	R	W	Result
1	Craig Young	8 September 2014	Ireland	Scotland	1	10	46	5	Ireland won
2	Majid Haq	12 September 2014	Scotland	Ireland	1	10	54	5	Scotland won
3	Dasun Shanaka	16 June 2016	Sri Lanka	Ireland	2	9	43	5	Sri Lanka won
4	Imad Wasim	18 August 2016	Pakistan	Ireland	2	5.4	14	5	Pakistan won
5	Mitchell Santner	14 May 2017 (Note: This match was part of the 2017 Ireland Tri-Nation Series between host team Ireland, Bangladesh and New Zealand.)	New Zealand	Ireland	2	10	50	5	New Zealand won

Five-wicket hauls in Women's One Day International matches at Malahide Cricket Club
No.	Bowler	Date	Team	Opposing Team	Inn	O	R	W	Result
1	Suné Luus	9 August 2016	South Africa	Ireland	2	10	32	5	South Africa won

== See also ==
- Cricket Ireland Academy
