= 2026 Glasgow Cosmic season =

Scottish cricket team season

Glasgow Cosmic
2026 season
- Coach: Matthew Hayden
- Captain: George Munsey
- Overseas player: (New Zealand) Finn Allen; (England) Liam Livingstone; (Namibia) Gerhard Erasmus; (England) Jason Roy; (Australia) Josh Philippe; (South Africa) Keshav Maharaj; (South Africa) Lungi Ngidi; (South Africa) Duan Jansen; (United States) Ali Khan
- League stage: 6th
- Knockout stage: Did not qualify
- Most runs: George Munsey (254)
- Most wickets: Liam Livingstone (9)

The 2026 Glasgow Cosmic season is the inaugural season of the franchise in the European T20 Premier League (ETPL). The team is captained by George Munsey and coached by Matthew Hayden.

Glasgow began their inaugural campaign with a 7-wicket defeat to Edinburgh Castle Rockers a 33-run win over Dublin Guardians in their second game a 5-wicket defeat to Rotterdam Dockers a 7-wicket defeat to Amsterdam Flames a 26-run defeat to Belfast Wolves in their five game a 7-wicket defeat to Edinburgh Castle Rockers

The ETPL is heading to Malahide Cricket Ground in Malahide, Ireland and the second half is ready to begin. a 31-runs defeat to Rotterdam Dockers a 6-wicket win over Dublin Guardians a 103-run defeat to Belfast Wolves Glassgow completed their league campaign with a 5-wicket defeat to Amsterdam Flames. The second half of the tournament was dominant; the Cosmic went 1–3 in their four remaining games. They failed to qualify for Playoffs.

== Current squad ==
- Players with international caps are listed in **bold**.

Glasgow Cosmic roster
No.	Name	Nationality	Birth date	Batting style	Bowling style	Notes
Batters
—	**Finn Allen**	New Zealand	22 April 1999 (age 27)	Right-handed	—	Overseas player
—	**Richie Berrington**	Scotland	3 April 1987 (age 39)	Right-handed	Right-arm medium-fast	Affiliated local player
—	**George Munsey (c)**	Scotland	21 February 1993 (age 33)	Left-handed	Right-arm medium	Affiliated local player
—	**Chris McBride**	Scotland	26 June 1999 (age 27)	Right-handed	Right-arm medium	Affiliated local player; Drafted
All-rounders
—	**Liam Livingstone**	England	4 August 1993 (age 33)	Right-handed	Right-arm off break	Overseas player
—	**Gerhard Erasmus**	Namibia	11 April 1995 (age 31)	Right-handed	Right-arm off break	Associate player
—	**Kamindu Mendis**	Sri Lanka	30 September 1998 (age 27)	Left-handed	Right-arm off break	Overseas player
—	**Michael Leask**	Scotland	29 October 1990 (age 35)	Right-handed	Right-arm off break	Affiliated local player; Drafted
—	**Moises Henriques**	Portugal	1 February 1987 (age 39)	Right-handed	Right-arm medium	European associate player
Wicket-keepers
—	**Josh Philippe**	Australia	1 June 1997 (age 29)	Right-handed	—	Overseas player
—	**Matthew Cross**	Scotland	15 October 1992 (age 33)	Right-handed	—	Affiliated local player; Drafted
Bowlers
—	**Keshav Maharaj**	South Africa	7 February 1990 (age 36)	Right-handed	Slow left-arm orthodox	Overseas player
—	**Lungi Ngidi**	South Africa	29 March 1996 (age 30)	Right-handed	Right-arm fast-medium	Overseas player
—	Duan Jansen	South Africa	1 May 2000 (age 26)	Right-handed	Left-arm fast	Overseas player
—	**Ali Khan**	United States	13 December 1990 (age 35)	Right-handed	Right-arm fast-medium	Associate player
—	**Brad Currie**	Scotland	8 November 1998 (age 27)	Right-handed	Left-arm medium-fast	Affiliated local player; Drafted
—	**Paul van Meekeren**	Netherlands	15 January 1993 (age 33)	Right-handed	Right-arm fast-medium	Local player; Drafted
—	**Oliver Davidson**	Scotland	28 July 2004 (age 22)	Left-handed	Slow left-arm orthodox	Affiliated local player; Drafted

== League stage ==
The fixtures for the inaugural season were announced on 28 July 2026 and are split in two legs: the first 17 matches will be played at Sportpark Westvliet in Voorburg, Netherlands, and the second 13 matches at the Malahide Cricket Ground in Malahide, Ireland.

=== Round 1 (Voorburg) ===
Match 3
27 August 2026
15:15
Scorecard

Glasgow Cosmic; 115 (20 overs)	v	Edinburgh Castle Rockers (H); 116/3 (11.3 overs)
Keshav Maharaj 29* (27); Trent Boult 5/24 (4 overs)		Andries Gous 40* (28); Lungi Ngidi 1/13 (2 overs)

Edinburgh Castle Rockers won by 7 wickets
Sportpark Westvliet, Voorburg
Umpires: Rizwan Akram (Ned) and Chris Brown (NZ)
Player of the match: Trent Boult (Edinburgh Castle Rockers)

- Edinburgh Castle Rockers won the toss and elected to field.
- Trent Boult (Edinburgh Castle Rockers) took his maiden five-wicket haul in T20s.

Match 5
29 August 2026
11:30
Scorecard

Glasgow Cosmic (H); 183/5 (20 overs)	v	Dublin Guardians; 150 (19.3 overs)
Jason Roy 60 (37); Matt Hollard 2/29 (4 overs)		Harry Tector 75 (45); Lungi Ngidi 4/21 (4 overs)

Glasgow Cosmic won by 33 runs
Sportpark Westvliet, Voorburg
Umpires: David McLean (Sco) and Ryan Milne (Sco)
Player of the match: Richie Berrington (Glasgow Cosmic)

- Dublin Guardians won the toss and elected to field.

Match 9
1 September 2026
15:15
Scorecard

Glasgow Cosmic (H); 140/9 (20 overs)	v	Rotterdam Dockers; 141/5 (19.5 overs)
Liam Livingstone 54 (39); Anrich Nortje 3/20 (4 overs)		Ben McDermott 37* (24); Paul van Meekeren 3/21 (4 overs)

Rotterdam Dockers won by 5 wickets
Sportpark Westvliet, Voorburg
Umpires: Roland Black (Ire) and Chris Brown (NZ)
Player of the match: Ben McDermott (Rotterdam Dockers)

- Rotterdam Dockers won the toss and elected to field.

Match 12
3 September 2026
15:15
Scorecard

Glasgow Cosmic; 171/8 (20 overs)	v	Amsterdam Flames (H); 177/3 (16.5 overs)
George Munsey 67 (49); Tim Pringle 2/23 (4 overs)		Yuvraj Samra 73 (32); Keshav Maharaj 1/34 (4 overs)

Amsterdam Flames won by 7 wickets
Sportpark Westvliet, Voorburg
Umpires: Chris Brown (NZ) and Roland Black (Ire)
Player of the match: Yuvraj Samra (Amsterdam Flames)

- Glasgow Cosmic won the toss and elected to bat.

Match 13
4 September 2026
15:15
Scorecard

Belfast Wolves; 146/3 (12 overs)	v	Glasgow Cosmic (H); 120/8 (12 overs)
Mark Chapman 71* (33); Lungi Ngidi 1/31 (3 overs)		Jason Roy 54 (28); Fred Klaassen 3/21 (3 overs)

Belfast Wolves won by 26 runs
Sportpark Westvliet, Voorburg
Umpires: Chris Brown (NZ) and Ryan Milne (Sco)
Player of the match: Mark Chapman (Belfast Wolves)

- Glasgow Cosmic won the toss and elected to field.
- The match was reduced to 12 overs per side due to rain.

Match 16
6 September 2026
11:30
Scorecard

Glasgow Cosmic (H); 159/6 (20 overs)	v	Edinburgh Castle Rockers; 163/3 (19 overs)
Richie Berrington 38 (20); Tom Curran 2/29 (4 overs)		Brandon McMullen 82* (47); Oliver Davidson 2/31 (4 overs)

Edinburgh Castle Rockers won by 7 wickets
Sportpark Westvliet, Voorburg
Umpires: Chris Brown (NZ) and David McLean (Sco)
Player of the match: Brandon McMullen (Edinburgh Castle Rockers)

- Edinburgh Castle Rockers won the toss and elected to field.

=== Round 2 (Malahide) ===
Match 19
10 September 2026
10:30
Scorecard

Rotterdam Dockers (H); 172/4 (19 overs)	v	Glasgow Cosmic; 141/9 (19 overs)
Faf du Plessis 71 (42); Tymal Mills 2/35 (4 overs)		Jimmy Neesham 28 (17); Logan van Beek 4/19 (4 overs)

Rotterdam Dockers won by 31 runs
Malahide Cricket Ground, Malahide
Umpires: Aidan Seaver (Ire) and Nitin Bathi (Ned)
Player of the match: Faf du Plessis (Rotterdam Dockers)

- Glasgow Cosmic won the toss and elected to field.
- The match was reduced to 19 overs per side due to rain.

Match 23
12 September 2026
14:15
Scorecard

Dublin Guardians (H); 159 (19.3 overs)	v	Glasgow Cosmic; 162/4 (18.5 overs)
Vijay Shankar 67 (43); Ali Khan 4/22 (3.3 overs)		George Munsey 50* (33); Ravichandran Ashwin 1/17 (4 overs)

Glasgow Cosmic won by 6 wickets
Malahide Cricket Ground, Malahide
Umpires: Nitin Bathi (Ned) and Jonathan Kennedy (Ire)
Player of the match: George Munsey (Glasgow Cosmic)

- Dublin Guardians won the toss and elected to bat.

Match 25
13 September 2026
14:15
Scorecard

Belfast Wolves (H); 187/8 (20 overs)	v	Glasgow Cosmic; 84 (14.5 overs)
Mark Chapman 54 (25); Liam Livingstone 3/27 (4 overs)		Moises Henriques 31 (25); Matthew Humphreys 4/19 (4 overs)

Belfast Wolves won by 103 runs
Malahide Cricket Ground, Malahide
Umpires: Gareth Morrison (Ire) and Roland Black (Ire)
Player of the match: Matthew Humphreys (Belfast Wolves)

- Glasgow Cosmic won the toss and elected to field.

Match 28
16 September 2026
14:15
Scorecard

Glasgow Cosmic (H); 126 (19.5 overs)	v	Amsterdam Flames; 127/5 (16 overs)
George Munsey 51 (45); Bas de Leede 4/6 (1.5 overs)		Curtis Campher 44 (30); Tymal Mills 2/32 (4 overs)

Amsterdam Flames won by 5 wickets
Malahide Cricket Ground, Malahide
Umpires: Roland Black (Ire) and Gareth Morrison (Ire)
Player of the match: David Payne (Amsterdam Flames)

- Amsterdam Flames won the toss and elected to field.

== Standing ==
=== Points table ===
Pos	Team	Pld	W	L	NR	Pts	NRR	Qualification
1	Edinburgh Castle Rockers	10	6	3	1	13	1.208	Advanced to the Final
2	Amsterdam Flames	10	6	3	1	13	1.037	Advanced to the Qualifier
3	Belfast Wolves	10	6	3	1	13	0.602	Advanced to the Qualifier
4	Rotterdam Dockers	10	6	3	1	13	−0.024	Eliminated
5	Dublin Guardians	10	2	8	0	4	−0.943	Eliminated
6	Glasgow Cosmic	10	2	8	0	4	−1.450	Eliminated

Source: Cricinfo

=== Match summary ===
Team	League matches										Finals	
Team	1	2	3	4	5	6	7	8	9	10	QF	F
Glasgow Cosmic	0	2	2	2	2	2	2	2	2	2		

Win	Loss	Tie	No result

== Administration and support staff ==
Position	Name
Owner	Matthew Hayden, Tansha Batra, Mugafi Group
Head coach	Matthew Hayden
Assistant coach	Matthew Mott
Bowling coach	Varun Aaron
Fielding coach	Donovan Miller
