= 2026 European T20 Premier League final =

Cricket match

- Event: 2026 European T20 Premier League
Belfast Wolves	Edinburgh Castle Rockers
150/5	151/3
20 overs	18.4 overs
- Edinburgh Castle Rockers won by 7 wickets
- Date: September 20, 2026 14:30 UTC+1
- Venue: Malahide Cricket Club Ground, Malahide, Ireland
- Umpires: Roland Black (Ire) and Gareth Morrison (Ire)

The 2026 European T20 Premier League final was a Twenty20 cricket match played at Malahide Cricket Club Ground in Malahide, Ireland on 20 September 2026 to determine the winner of the 2026 European T20 Premier League. It was played between the Edinburgh Castle Rockers and Belfast Wolves.

Edinburgh Castle Rockers won the toss and elected to field first; Belfast Wolves managed to score 150/5 in their innings. In the second innings, Edinburgh Castle Rockers chased down the target in 18.4 overs to win their first title.

== Background ==
The tournament was launched as a joint franchise league for Ireland, Scotland and the Netherlands, with six city-based teams participating. The inaugural season was originally planned for 2025, but postponed to 2026 following investment delays and shifting commercial priorities, including investor focus on other franchise competitions such as The Hundred.

The inaugural season started on 26 August, with the Final scheduled for Sunday, 20 September 2026. The competition features 30 league-stage matches, followed by a Qualifier and the Final.

On Playoffs, Belfast Wolves defeated Amsterdam Flames by 7 wickets in the Qualifier.

The inaugural ETPL season reached its climax on 20th September as Edinburgh Castle Rockers took on Belfast Wolves in the final at Malahide.

== Road to the final ==
The Edinburgh Castle Rockers, Amsterdam Flames, Belfast Wolves and Rotterdam Dockers all finished the league stage with 13 points from 10 matches.

Edinburgh Castle Rockers finished first with the best net run rate, and qualified directly for the final. Amsterdam Flames finished second and Belfast Wolves finished third, with the two teams scheduled to meet in the Qualifier for a place in the final. Rotterdam Dockers finished fourth and were eliminated from the tournament.

Edinburgh Castle Rockers			Matches	Belfast Wolves
League Stage
Opponent	Date	Result	Match	Opponent	Date	Result
Glasgow Cosmic	August 27, 2026	Won	Match 1	Dublin Guardians	August 27, 2026	Won
Amsterdam Flames	August 28, 2026	Won	Match 2	Rotterdam Dockers	August 29, 2026	No result
Dublin Guardians	August 30, 2026	Won	Match 3	Amsterdam Flames	August 30, 2026	Won
Belfast Wolves	September 2, 2026	Won	Match 4	Edinburgh Castle Rockers	September 2, 2026	Lost
Rotterdam Dockers	September 5, 2026	Won	Match 5	Glasgow Cosmic	September 4, 2026	Won
Glasgow Cosmic	September 6, 2026	Won	Match 6	Rotterdam Dockers	September 6, 2026	Won
Dublin Guardians	September 11, 2026	Won	Match 7	Belfast Wolves	September 10, 2026	Lost
Amsterdam Flames	September 13, 2026	Lost	Match 8	Edinburgh Castle Rockers	September 13, 2026	Won
Rotterdam Dockers	September 15, 2026	Lost	Match 9	Dublin Guardians	September 15, 2026	Won
Belfast Wolves	September 17, 2026	Lost	Match 10	Glasgow Cosmic	September 16, 2026	Won
Playoff stage
Direct qualification				Qualifier
Opponent	Date	Result	Match	Opponent	Date	Result
—	September 20, 2026	Qualified directly for final	Final	Amsterdam Flames	September 19, 2026	Won
2026 European T20 Premier League final

== Match ==
=== Match officials ===
- On-field umpires: Roland Black (Ire) and Gareth Morrison (Ire)
- Third umpire: Nitin Bathi (Ned)
- Reserve umpire: Aidan Seaver (Ire)
- Match referee: Philip Thompson (Ire)
- Toss: Edinburgh Castle Rockers won the toss and elected to field.

=== Scorecard ===
Final
20 September 2026
14:15
Scorecard

Edinburgh Castle Rockers; 150/5 (20 overs)	v	Belfast Wolves; 151/3 (18.4 overs)
Tim Tector 84 (62); Trent Boult 2/21 (4 overs)		Andries Gous 90 (61); Matthew Humphreys 1/29 (4 overs)

Edinburgh Castle Rockers won by 7 wickets
Malahide Cricket Ground, Malahide
Umpires: Roland Black (Ire) and Gareth Morrison (Ire)
Player of the match: Andries Gous (Edinburgh Castle Rockers)

- Edinburgh Castle Rockers won the toss and elected to field.
