= Leslie E. Rollins =

American film set director

- Occupation: Set decorator
- Years active: 1985-present

Leslie E. Rollins is a set decorator who has worked on nearly 40 movies since his start in 1985. He was nominated at the 79th Academy Awards in the category of Best Art Direction for his work on the film The Good Shepherd. He shared his nomination with Jeannine Oppewall and Gretchen Rau.

In addition he was nominated for an Emmy award for the made-for-television film, In Search of Dr. Seuss.

== Selected filmography ==
- For Love or Money (1993)
- House of Cards (1993)
- Blue Sky (1994)
- Guarding Tess (1994)
- In Search of Dr. Seuss (1994)
- Miracle on 34th Street (1994)
- The First Wives Club (1996)
- The Thomas Crown Affair (1999)
- Miss Congeniality (2000)
- A Beautiful Mind (2001)
- Hearts in Atlantis (2001)
- 13 Going on 30 (2004)
- The Departed (2006)
- The Good Shepherd (2006)
- American Gangster (2007)
- Get Smart (2008)
- G-Force (2009)
- Salt (2010)
- The Bourne Legacy (2012)
- The Equalizer (2014)
