= 79th Academy Awards =

- Official poster
- Date: February 25, 2007
- Site: Kodak Theatre; Hollywood, Los Angeles, California, U.S.
- Hosted by: Ellen DeGeneres
- Preshow hosts: Chris Connelly; Lisa Ling; André Leon Talley; Allyson Waterman
- Produced by: Laura Ziskin
- Directed by: Louis J. Horvitz

Highlights
- Best Picture: The Departed
- Most awards: The Departed (4)
- Most nominations: Dreamgirls (8)

TV in the United States
- Network: ABC
- Duration: 3 hours, 51 minutes
- Ratings: 39.92 million 23.59% (Nielsen ratings)

The 79th Academy Awards ceremony, presented by the Academy of Motion Picture Arts and Sciences (AMPAS), honored the best films of 2006 and took place February 25, 2007, at the Kodak Theatre in Hollywood, Los Angeles beginning at 5:30 p.m. PST / 8:30 p.m. EST. During the ceremony, the Academy of Motion Picture Arts and Sciences presented Academy Awards (commonly referred to as Oscars) in 24 categories. The ceremony, televised in the United States by ABC, was produced by Laura Ziskin and directed by Louis J. Horvitz. Actress Ellen DeGeneres hosted for the first time. Two weeks earlier in a ceremony at the Beverly Wilshire Hotel in Beverly Hills, California held on February 10, the Academy Awards for Technical Achievement were presented by host Maggie Gyllenhaal.

The Departed won four awards, including Best Picture. Other winners included Pan's Labyrinth with three awards, Dreamgirls, An Inconvenient Truth, and Little Miss Sunshine with two, and Babel, The Blood of Yingzhou District, The Danish Poet, Happy Feet, The Last King of Scotland, Letters from Iwo Jima, The Lives of Others, Marie Antoinette, Pirates of the Caribbean: Dead Man's Chest, The Queen, and West Bank Story with one. The telecast garnered nearly 40 million viewers in the United States.

== Winners and nominees ==
The nominees for the 79th Academy Awards were announced on January 23, 2007, at the Samuel Goldwyn Theater in Beverly Hills, California, by Sid Ganis, president of the academy, and the actress Salma Hayek. Dreamgirls received the most nominations with eight, and Babel came in second with seven. This marked the first and only occurrence that the film with the most nominations was not a Best Picture nominee.

The winners were announced during the awards ceremony on February 25, 2007. With his latest unsuccessful nomination for Best Actor, Peter O'Toole became the most nominated performer without a competitive win. Best Supporting Actress winner Jennifer Hudson became the fifteenth person to win for their debut film performance. "I Need to Wake Up" from An Inconvenient Truth became the first song from a documentary film to win Best Original Song.

=== Awards ===
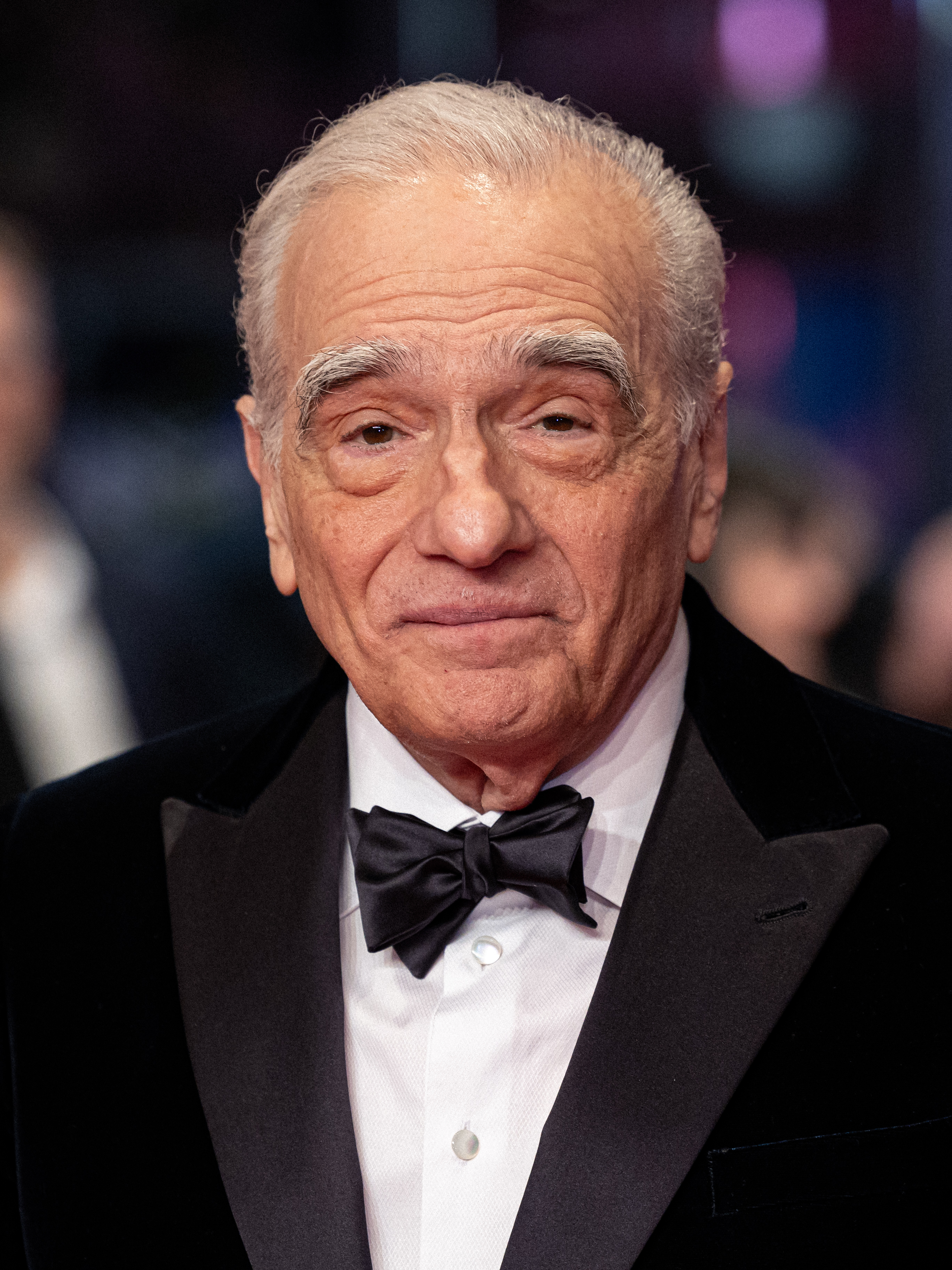
Martin Scorsese, Best Director winner

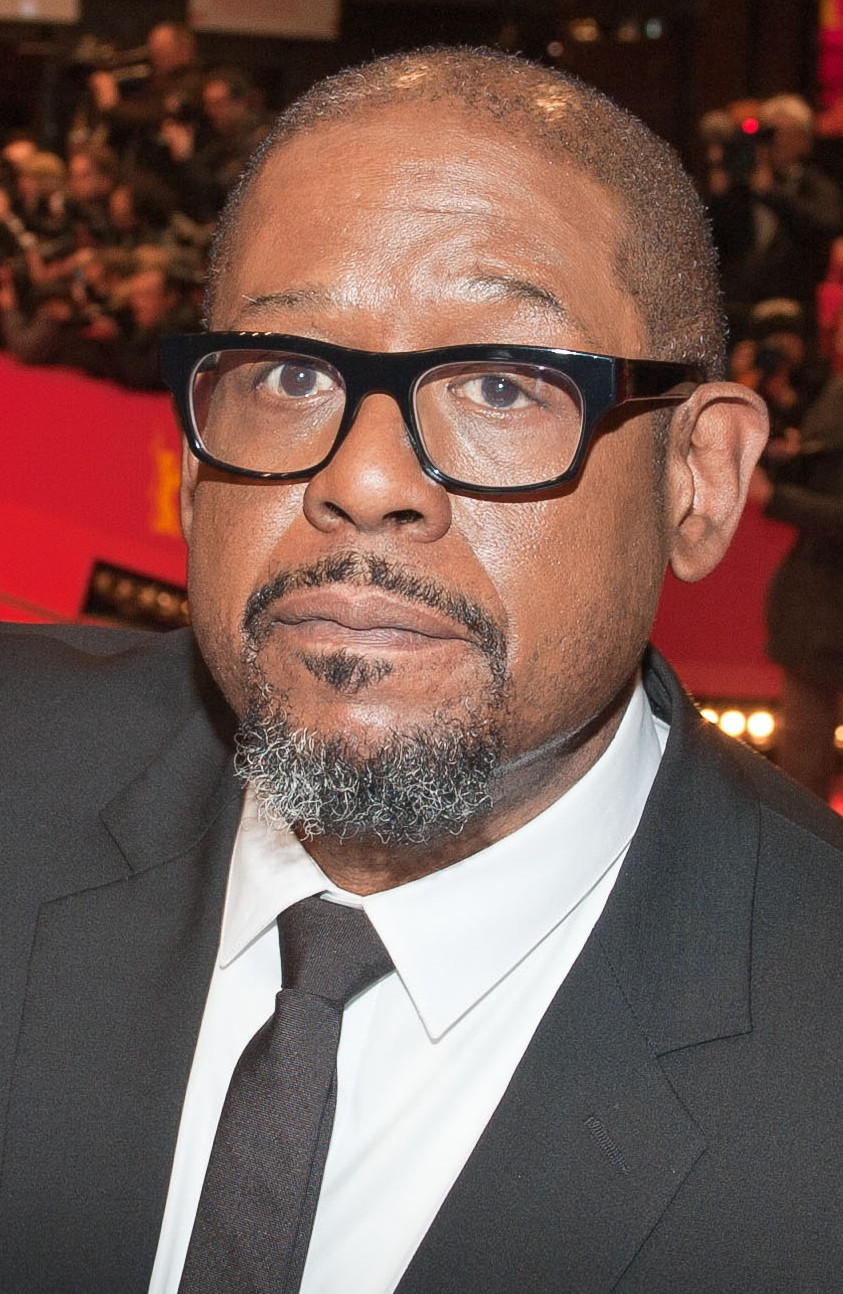
Forest Whitaker, Best Actor winner

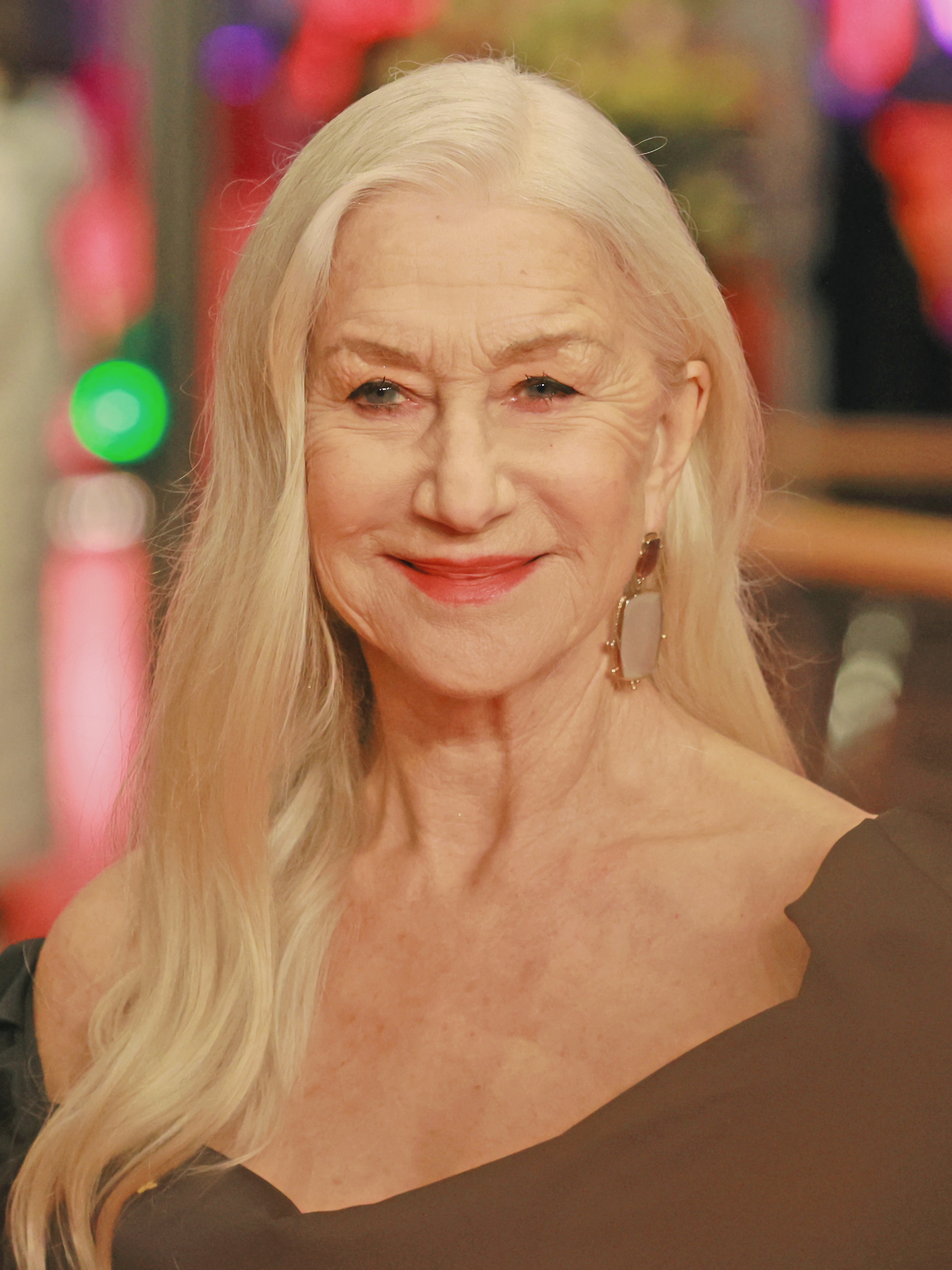
Helen Mirren, Best Actress winner

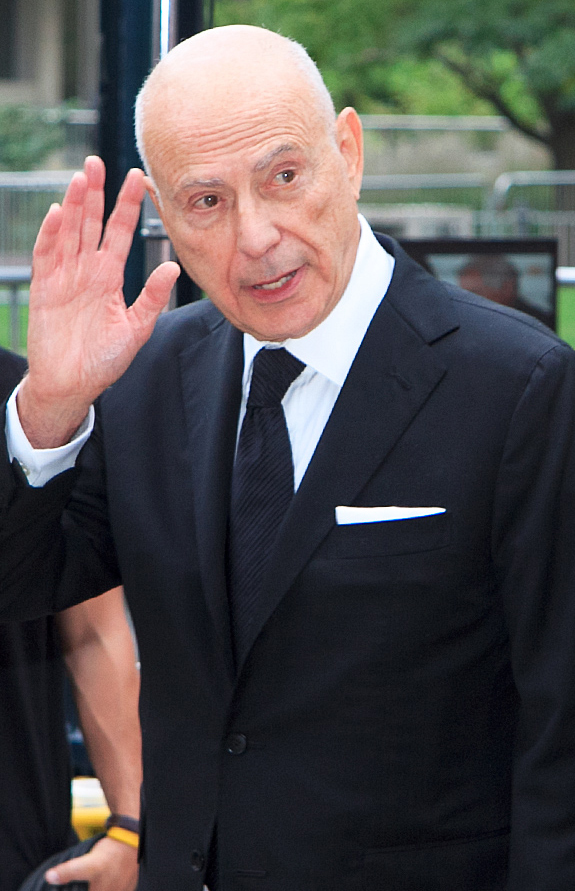
Alan Arkin, Best Supporting Actor winner

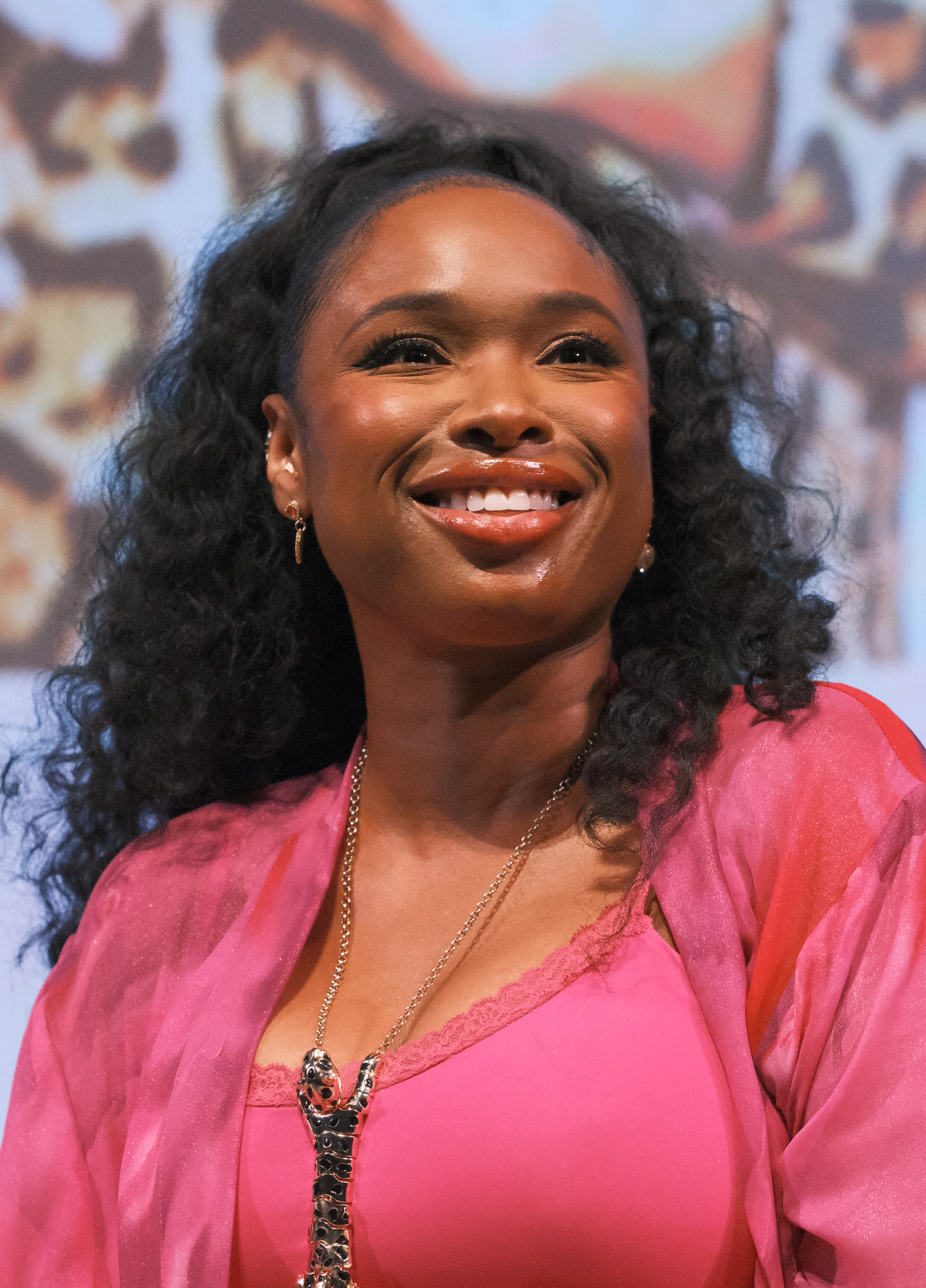
Jennifer Hudson, Best Supporting Actress winner

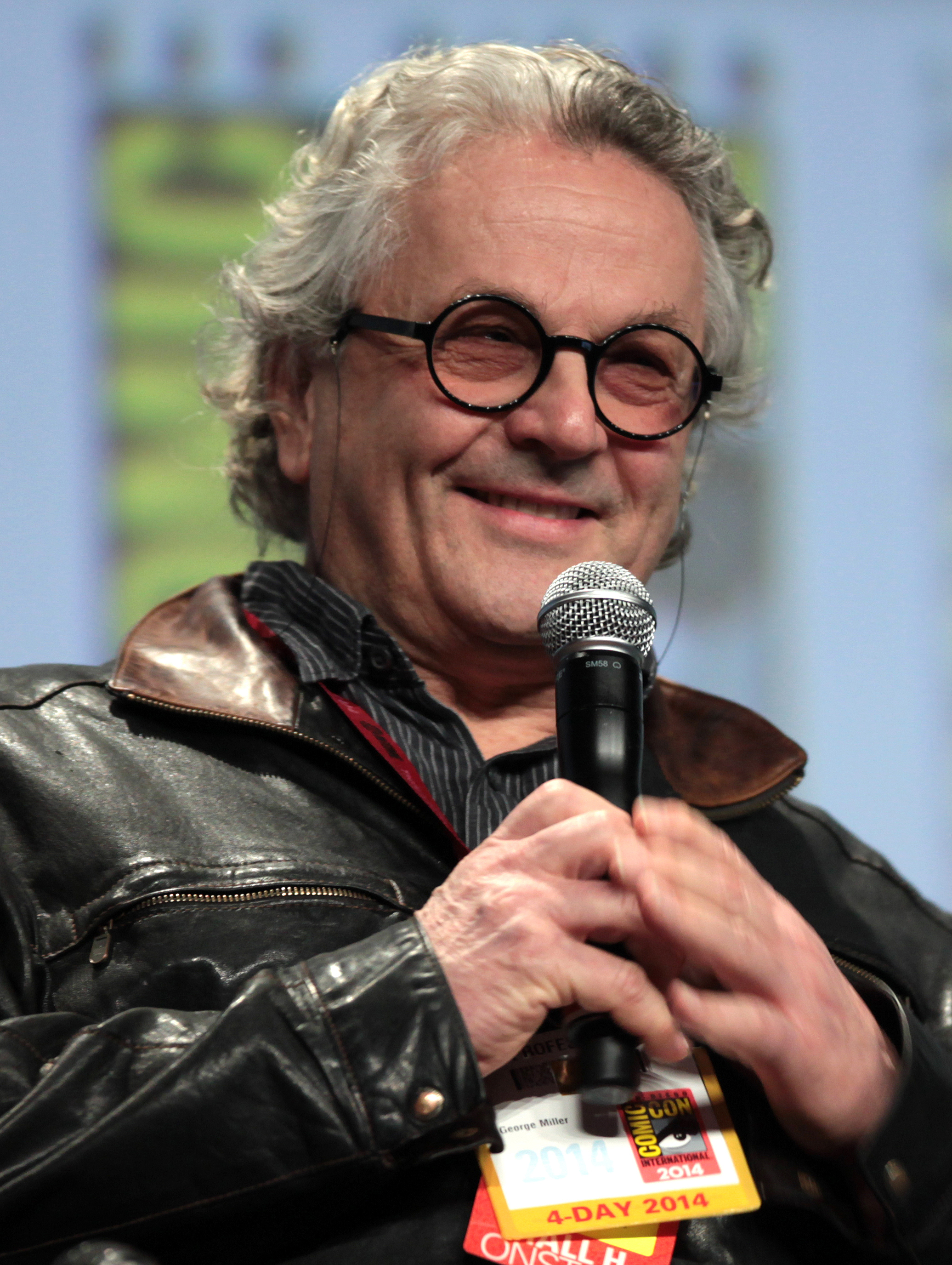
George Miller, Best Animated Feature winner

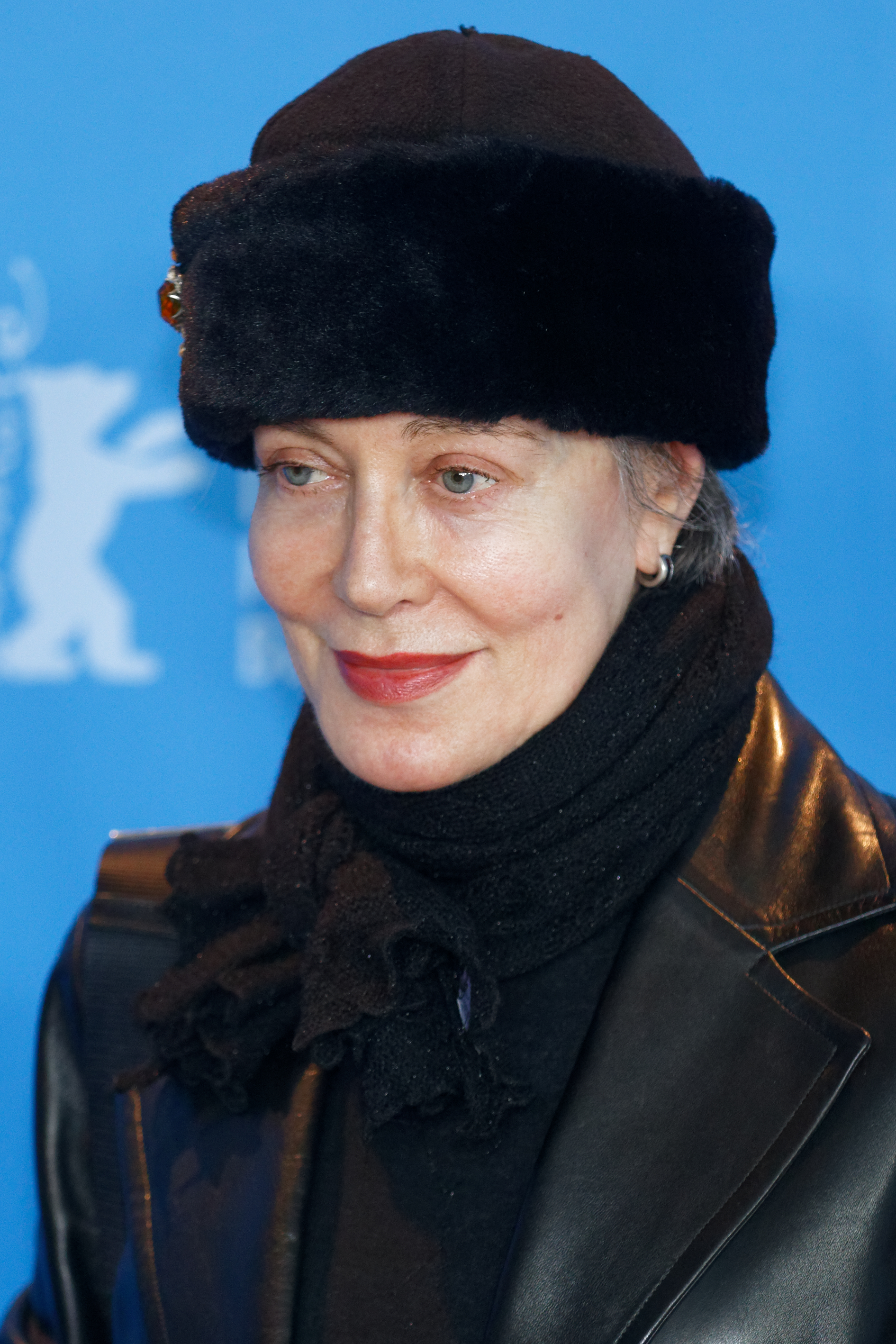
Milena Canonero, Best Costume Design winner

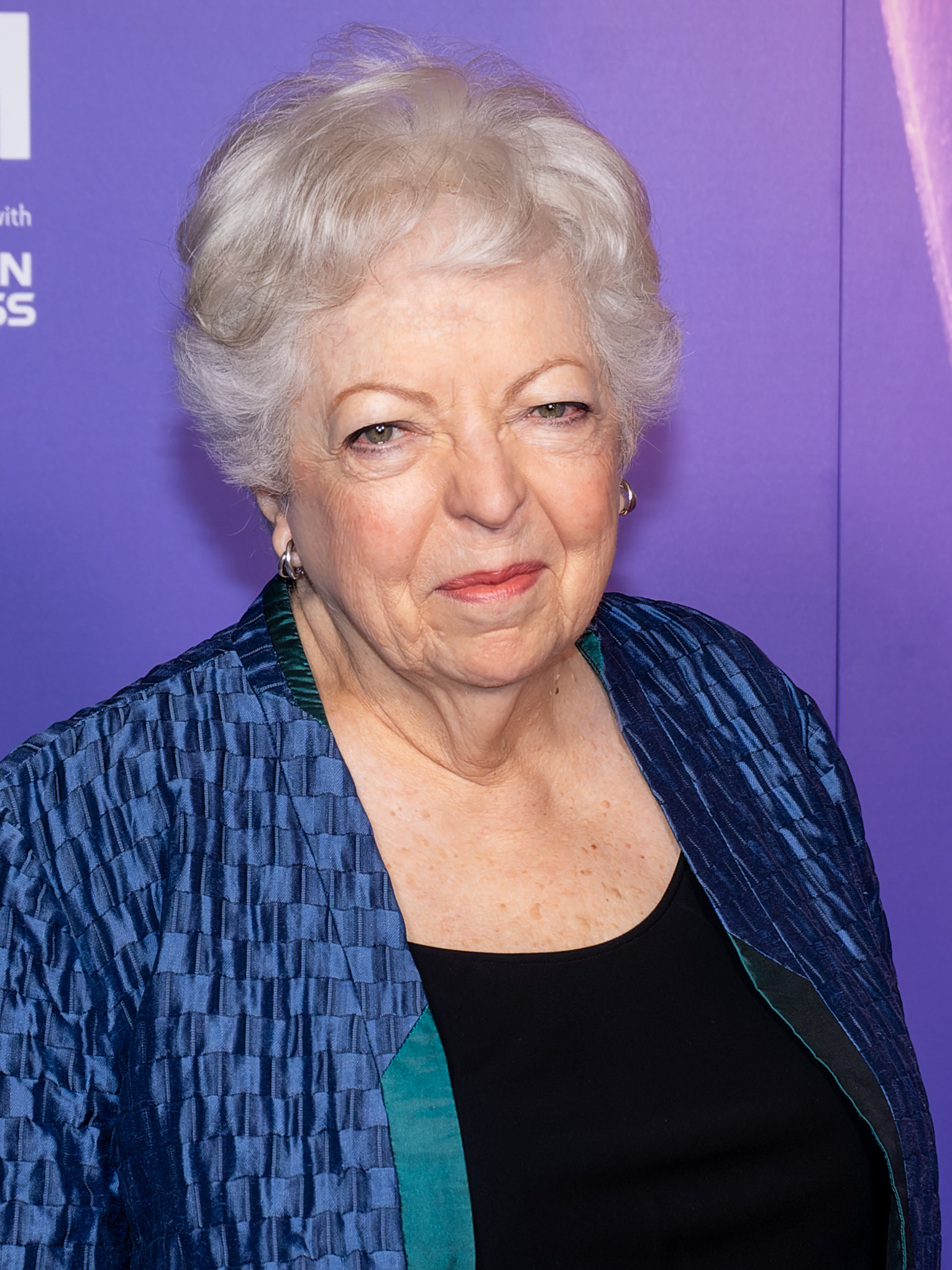
Thelma Schoonmaker, Best Film Editing winner

Winners are listed first, highlighted in boldface, and indicated with a double dagger (‡).

**Best Picture**: **The Departed – Graham King, producer**‡; Babel – Alejandro González Iñárritu, Jon Kilik and Steve Golin, producers; Letters from Iwo Jima – Clint Eastwood, Steven Spielberg and Robert Lorenz, producers; Little Miss Sunshine – David T. Friendly, Peter Saraf and Marc Turtletaub, producers; The Queen – Andy Harries, Christine Langan and Tracey Seaward, producers	**Best Directing**: **Martin Scorsese – The Departed**‡; Alejandro González Iñárritu – Babel; Clint Eastwood – Letters from Iwo Jima; Stephen Frears – The Queen; Paul Greengrass – United 93
**Best Actor in a Leading Role**: **Forest Whitaker – The Last King of Scotland as Idi Amin**‡; Leonardo DiCaprio – Blood Diamond as Danny Archer; Ryan Gosling – Half Nelson as Dan Dunne; Peter O'Toole – Venus as Maurice; Will Smith – The Pursuit of Happyness as Chris Gardner	**Best Actress in a Leading Role**: **Helen Mirren – The Queen as Queen Elizabeth II**‡; Penélope Cruz – Volver as Raimunda; Judi Dench – Notes on a Scandal as Barbara Covett; Meryl Streep – The Devil Wears Prada as Miranda Priestly; Kate Winslet – Little Children as Sarah Pierce
**Best Actor in a Supporting Role**: **Alan Arkin – Little Miss Sunshine as Edwin Hoover**‡; Jackie Earle Haley – Little Children as Ronald James McGorvey; Djimon Hounsou – Blood Diamond as Solomon Vandy; Eddie Murphy – Dreamgirls as James "Thunder" Early; Mark Wahlberg – The Departed as Staff Sergeant Sean Dignam	**Best Actress in a Supporting Role**: **Jennifer Hudson – Dreamgirls as Effie White**‡; Adriana Barraza – Babel as Amelia Hernandez; Cate Blanchett – Notes on a Scandal as Bathsheba "Sheba" Hart; Abigail Breslin – Little Miss Sunshine as Olive Hoover; Rinko Kikuchi – Babel as Chieko Wataya
**Best Writing (Original Screenplay)**: **Little Miss Sunshine – Michael Arndt**‡; Babel – Guillermo Arriaga; Letters from Iwo Jima – Screenplay by Iris Yamashita; Story by Iris Yamashita and Paul Haggis; Pan's Labyrinth – Guillermo del Toro; The Queen – Peter Morgan	**Best Writing (Adapted Screenplay)**: **The Departed – William Monahan based on the film Infernal Affairs**‡; Borat: Cultural Learnings of America for Make Benefit Glorious Nation of Kazakhstan – Screenplay by Sacha Baron Cohen, Anthony Hines, Peter Baynham and Dan Mazer; Story by Sacha Baron Cohen, Peter Baynham, Anthony Hines and Todd Phillips; Children of Men – Alfonso Cuarón, Timothy J. Sexton, David Arata, Mark Fergus and Hawk Ostby based on the book by P. D. James; Little Children – Todd Field and Tom Perrotta based on the novel by Tom Perrotta; Notes on a Scandal – Patrick Marber based on the book by Zoë Heller
**Best Animated Feature Film**: **Happy Feet – George Miller**‡; Cars – John Lasseter; Monster House – Gil Kenan	**Best Foreign Language Film**: **The Lives of Others (Germany) in German – Florian Henckel von Donnersmarck**‡; After the Wedding (Denmark) in Danish, Hindi, and Swedish – Susanne Bier; Days of Glory (Indigènes) (Algeria) in Arabic – Rachid Bouchareb; Pan's Labyrinth (Mexico) in Spanish – Guillermo del Toro; Water (Canada) in Hindi and English – Deepa Mehta
**Best Documentary (Feature)**: **An Inconvenient Truth – Davis Guggenheim**‡; Deliver Us from Evil – Amy Berg and Frank Donner; Iraq in Fragments – James Longley and John Sinno; Jesus Camp – Heidi Ewing and Rachel Grady; My Country, My Country – Laura Poitras and Jocelyn Glatzer	**Best Documentary (Short Subject)**: **The Blood of Yingzhou District – Ruby Yang and Thomas Lennon**‡; Recycled Life – Leslie Iwerks and Mike Glad; Rehearsing a Dream – Karen Goodman and Kirk Simon; Two Hands – Nathaniel Kahn and Susan Rose Behr
**Best Short Film (Live Action)**: **West Bank Story – Ari Sandel**‡; Binta and the Great Idea – Javier Fesser and Luis Manso; Éramos pocos (One Too Many) – Borja Cobeaga; Helmer & Son – Søren Pilmark and Kim Magnusson; The Saviour – Peter Templeman and Stuart Parkyn	**Best Short Film (Animated)**: **The Danish Poet – Torill Kove**‡; Lifted – Gary Rydstrom; The Little Matchgirl – Roger Allers and Don Hahn; Maestro – Géza M. Tóth; No Time for Nuts – Chris Renaud and Michael Thurmeier
**Best Music (Original Score)**: **Babel – Gustavo Santaolalla**‡; The Good German – Thomas Newman; Notes on a Scandal – Philip Glass; Pan's Labyrinth – Javier Navarrete; The Queen – Alexandre Desplat	**Best Music (Original Song)**: **"I Need to Wake Up" from An Inconvenient Truth – Music and Lyrics by Melissa Etheridge**‡; "Listen" from Dreamgirls – Music by Henry Krieger and Scott Cutler; Lyrics by Anne Preven; "Love You I Do" from Dreamgirls – Music by Henry Krieger; Lyrics by Siedah Garrett; "Our Town" from Cars – Music and Lyrics by Randy Newman; "Patience" from Dreamgirls – Music by Henry Krieger; Lyrics by Willie Reale
**Best Sound Editing**: **Letters from Iwo Jima – Alan Robert Murray and Bub Asman**‡; Apocalypto – Sean McCormack and Kami Asgar; Blood Diamond – Lon Bender; Flags of Our Fathers – Alan Robert Murray and Bub Asman; Pirates of the Caribbean: Dead Man's Chest – Christopher Boyes and George Watters II	**Best Sound Mixing**: **Dreamgirls – Michael Minkler, Bob Beemer and Willie D. Burton**‡; Apocalypto – Kevin O'Connell, Greg P. Russell and Fernando Cámara; Blood Diamond – Andy Nelson, Anna Behlmer and Ivan Sharrock; Flags of Our Fathers – John T. Reitz, Dave Campbell, Gregg Rudloff and Walt Martin; Pirates of the Caribbean: Dead Man's Chest – Christopher Boyes, Paul Massey and Lee Orloff
**Best Art Direction**: **Pan's Labyrinth – Art Direction: Eugenio Caballero; Set Decoration: Pilar Revuelta**‡; Dreamgirls – Art Direction: John Myhre; Set Decoration: Nancy Haigh; The Good Shepherd – Art Direction: Jeannine Oppewall; Set Decoration: Gretchen Rau (posthumous nomination) and Leslie E. Rollins; Pirates of the Caribbean: Dead Man's Chest – Art Direction: Rick Heinrichs; Set Decoration: Cheryl Carasik; The Prestige – Art Direction: Nathan Crowley; Set Decoration: Julie Ochipinti	**Best Cinematography**: **Pan's Labyrinth – Guillermo Navarro**‡; The Black Dahlia – Vilmos Zsigmond; Children of Men – Emmanuel Lubezki; The Illusionist – Dick Pope; The Prestige – Wally Pfister
**Best Makeup**: **Pan's Labyrinth – David Martí and Montse Ribé**‡; Apocalypto – Aldo Signoretti and Vittorio Sodano; Click – Kazuhiro Tsuji and Bill Corso	**Best Costume Design**: **Marie Antoinette – Milena Canonero**‡; Curse of the Golden Flower – Yee Chung Man; The Devil Wears Prada – Patricia Field; Dreamgirls – Sharen Davis; The Queen – Consolata Boyle
**Best Film Editing**: **The Departed – Thelma Schoonmaker**‡; Babel – Douglas Crise and Stephen Mirrione; Blood Diamond – Steven Rosenblum; Children of Men – Alfonso Cuarón and Álex Rodríguez; United 93 – Clare Douglas, Richard Pearson and Christopher Rouse	**Best Visual Effects**: **Pirates of the Caribbean: Dead Man's Chest – John Knoll, Hal Hickel, Charles Gibson and Allen Hall**‡; Poseidon – Boyd Shermis, Kim Libreri, Chas Jarrett and John Frazier; Superman Returns – Mark Stetson, Neil Corbould, Richard R. Hoover and Jon Thum

=== Honorary Award ===
- To Ennio Morricone in recognition of his magnificent and multifaceted contributions to the art of film music.

=== Jean Hersholt Humanitarian Award ===
- Sherry Lansing

=== Films with multiple nominations and awards ===
The following 19 films received multiple nominations:

Nominations	Film
8	Dreamgirls
7	Babel
6	Pan's Labyrinth
6	The Queen
5	Blood Diamond
5	The Departed
4	Letters from Iwo Jima
4	Little Miss Sunshine
4	Notes on a Scandal
4	Pirates of the Caribbean: Dead Man's Chest
3	Apocalypto
3	Children of Men
3	Little Children
2	An Inconvenient Truth
2	Cars
2	Flags of Our Fathers
2	The Devil Wears Prada
2	The Prestige
2	United 93

The following five films received multiple awards:

Awards	Film
4	The Departed
3	Pan's Labyrinth
2	An Inconvenient Truth
2	Dreamgirls
2	Little Miss Sunshine

== Presenters and performers ==
The following individuals presented awards or performed musical numbers.

=== Presenters (in order of appearance) ===
Name(s)	Role
Gina Tuttle; Don LaFontaine	Announcers for the 79th annual Academy Awards
Daniel Craig; Nicole Kidman	Presenters of the award for Best Art Direction
Maggie Gyllenhaal	Presenter of the segment of the Academy Awards for Technical Achievement and the Gordon E. Sawyer Award
Jack Black; Will Ferrell; John C. Reilly	Presenters of the award for Best Makeup
Abigail Breslin; Jaden Smith	Presentations of the awards for Best Animated Short Film and Best Live Action Short Film
Steve Carell; Greg Kinnear	Presenters of the award for Best Sound Editing
Jessica Biel; James McAvoy	Presenters of the award for Best Sound Mixing
Rachel Weisz	Presenter of the award for Best Supporting Actor
Leonardo DiCaprio; Al Gore	Givers of a special announcement regarding the academy's plans to help the environment
Cameron Diaz	Presenter of the award for Best Animated Feature Film
Ben Affleck	Presenter of the "Tribute to Screenwriters" montage by Nancy Meyers
Tom Hanks; Helen Mirren	Presenters of the award for Best Adapted Screenplay
Emily Blunt; Anne Hathaway	Presenters of the award for Best Costume Design
Tom Cruise	Presenter of the Jean Hersholt Humanitarian Award to Sherry Lansing
Gwyneth Paltrow	Presenter of the award for Best Cinematography
Robert Downey Jr. Naomi Watts	Presenters of the award for Best Visual Effects
Catherine Deneuve; Ken Watanabe	Presenters of the "50 Years of Best Foreign Language Film Winners" montage by Giuseppe Tornatore
Cate Blanchett; Clive Owen	Presenters of the award for Best Foreign Language Film
George Clooney	Presenter of the award for Best Supporting Actress
Gael García Bernal; Eva Green	Presenters of the award for Best Documentary Short Subject
Jerry Seinfeld	Presenter of the award for Best Documentary Feature
Clint Eastwood	Presenter of the Academy Honorary Award to Ennio Morricone
Penélope Cruz; Hugh Jackman	Presenters of the award for Best Original Score
Sid Ganis (AMPAS president)	Presenter of a montage highlighting the academy's preservation and educational work
Kirsten Dunst; Tobey Maguire	Presenters of the award for Best Original Screenplay
Jennifer Lopez	Introducer of the performances of Best Original Song nominees "Love You I Do", "Listen" and "Patience"
Queen Latifah; John Travolta	Presenters of the award for Best Original Song
Will Smith	Introducer of a montage of films dealing with American politics by Michael Mann
Kate Winslet	Presenter of the award for Best Film Editing
Jodie Foster	Presenter of the "In Memoriam" tribute
Philip Seymour Hoffman	Presenter of the award for Best Actress
Reese Witherspoon	Presenter of the award for Best Actor
Francis Ford Coppola; George Lucas; Steven Spielberg	Presenters of the award for Best Director
Diane Keaton; Jack Nicholson	Presenters of the award for Best Picture

=== Performers (in order of appearance) ===
Name(s)	Role	Performed
William Ross	Musical arranger	Orchestral
Pilobolus	Performers	Interpretive depictions of films' titles and logos
Jack Black; Will Ferrell; John C. Reilly	Performers	"Comedian at the Oscars"
Steve Sidwell; Sound Effects Choir	Performers	"Elements & Motion" film sound effects performance
Randy Newman; James Taylor	Performers	"Our Town" from Cars
Melissa Etheridge	Performer	"I Need to Wake Up" from An Inconvenient Truth
Celine Dion	Performer	"I Knew I Loved You" during the Ennio Morricone tribute
Jennifer Hudson; Beyoncé; Anika Noni Rose; Keith Robinson	Performers	"Love You I Do", "Listen" and "Patience" from Dreamgirls

== Ceremony information ==
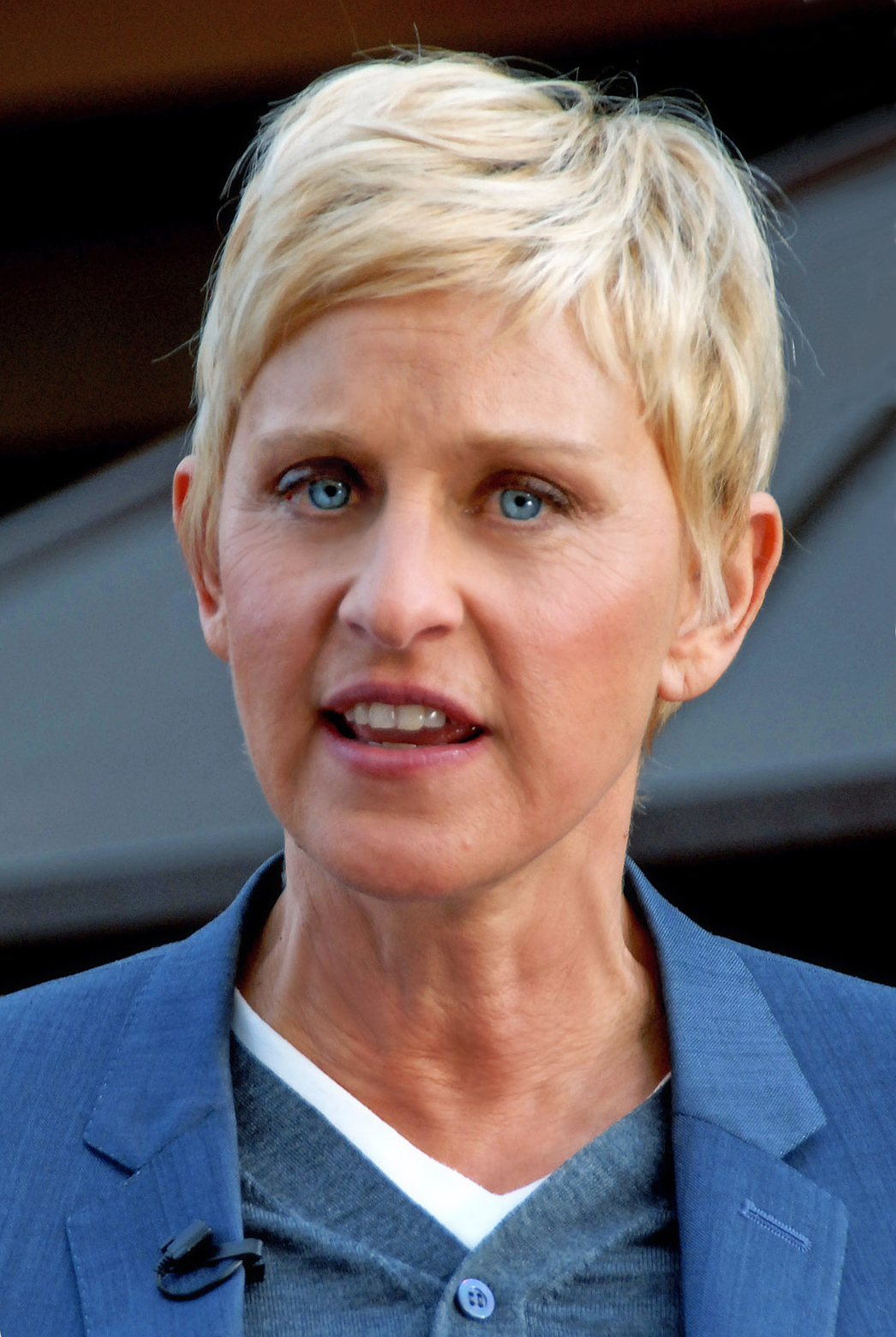
Ellen DeGeneres hosted the 79th Academy Awards

In July 2006, the academy selected producer Laura Ziskin to oversee production of the telecast for a second time. Nearly three months later, actress and comedian Ellen DeGeneres, who had previously emceed three Primetime Emmy Award ceremonies between 2001 and 2005, was chosen as host of the 2007 ceremony. In an article published in the Los Angeles Times, Ziskin explained the decision to hire DeGeneres saying "Certainly, I believe the presence of Ellen will help the ratings absolutely. She's popular with a very wide audience. She is not a niche performer. She touches a lot of demographics."

AMPAS christened this year's telecast with a theme celebrating movie quotes. In tandem with the theme, advertising agency TBWA\Chiat\Day designed the official ceremony poster featuring 75 quotes from several Oscar-nominated or winning films. To stir interest surrounding the awards, filmmaker Spike Lee released a trailer featuring everyday people around New York City reciting famous film lines. During the ceremony, a montage produced by director Nancy Meyers saluted the work of screenwriters and their contributions to film.

During the telecast, ex-U.S. Vice President and environmental activist Al Gore, and Best Actor nominee Leonardo DiCaprio announced that AMPAS would incorporate several environmentally and ecologically conscious features into the ceremony. Designed by Frank Webb and Matthew White, the Architectural Digest greenroom where presenters and winners mingled backstage featured several environmentally friendly features such as a rug made of recycled plastic bottles and walls painted without any volatile organic compounds. Other eco-friendly features included the transportation for guests of the awards via hybrid electric vehicles, usage of recyclable paper for ballots and invitations, and serving meals at the Governor's Ball on reusable plates and biodegradable dishware.

Several other people participated in the production of the ceremony. William Ross served as musical director for the ceremony. J. Michael Riva designed a new set and stage design for the ceremony. Voice actors Gina Tuttle and Don LaFontaine severed as the official announcers for the telecast. Actor Greg Vaughan and Lucky columnist Allyson Waterman co-hosted "Road to the Oscars", a weekly behind-the-scenes video blog on the Oscar ceremony website. Members of the dance troupe and contortionist group Pilobolus performed interpretive shadow figures representing scenes and logos from the nominated films. Actors Jack Black, Will Ferrell, and John C. Reilly performed a lighthearted musical number written by comedic director Judd Apatow and music composer Marc Shaiman satirizing comedy's lack of recognition at the Academy Awards. Before Ennio Morricone was honored with an Academy Honorary Award, Celine Dion performed a new song "I Knew I Loved You" in a tribute for him. Conducted by musician Steve Sidwell, the Sound Effects Choir performed voice effects to a montage of classic films. Another vignette directed by documentary filmmaker Errol Morris featuring several Oscar nominees discussing what it means to be an Oscar nominee was shown at the beginning of the show. Italian director Giuseppe Tornatore assembled a tribute highlighting previous winners of the Best Foreign Language Film. Filmmaker Michael Mann produced a montage highlighting American life through the eyes of cinema.

=== Box office performance of nominated films ===
At the time of the nominations announcement on January 23, the combined gross of the five Best Picture nominees was $244 million with an average of $48.7 million per film. The Departed was the highest earner among the Best Picture nominees with $121.7 million in domestic box office receipts. The film was followed by Little Miss Sunshine ($59.6 million), The Queen ($35.6 million), Babel ($23.7 million) and finally Letters from Iwo Jima ($2.4 million).

Of the top 50 grossing movies of the year, 29 nominations went to nine films on the list. Only The Pursuit of Happyness (12th), Borat: Cultural Learnings of America for Make Benefit Glorious Nation of Kazakhstan (15th), The Devil Wears Prada (16th), The Departed (17th) and Dreamgirls (28th) were nominated for Best Picture, Best Animated Feature or any of the directing, acting or screenwriting awards. The other top 50 box office hits that earned nominations were Pirates of the Caribbean: Dead Man's Chest (1st), Cars (2nd), Superman Returns (6th) and Happy Feet (8th).

=== Critical reviews ===
The show received a mixed reception from media publications. Some media outlets were more critical of the show. Tim Goodman of the San Francisco Chronicle lamented, "It was long. It was flat. And it was bloated. Worst of all, it was boring." He also wrote that "it was difficult for Ellen's subtle rambling to translate because people want pop and humor and declarative sentences in their Academy Awards. Which they didn't exactly get." The Denver Post television critic Joanne Ostrow bemoaned, "Pleasant and innocuous but hardly exciting, DeGeneres forgot the primary Academy Award host directive: It's not about the host. Hollywood's biggest night (and television's second-biggest annual gathering, after the Super Bowl) is a celebration of film." The Washington Post columnist Tom Shales gave an average review for DeGeneres but criticized the overall slow and choppy pacing of the program noting that it was "punishingly too long."

Other media outlets received the broadcast more positively. Columnist Alessandra Stanley of The New York Times lauded DeGeneres's performance writing that she was "cheeky but good-natured, far less barbed and sardonic than Jon Stewart last year or Chris Rock in 2005." She added that her style brought a "casual Friday mood to Fancy Sunday." St. Louis Post-Dispatch television critic Gail Pennington praised host DeGeneres and producer Ziskin for turning "the evening into an upbeat celebration––and the most entertaining Oscars in years." Television editor Dave Kronke of the Los Angeles Daily News gave high marks for DeGeneres commenting, "Her material was amusing but scarcely a laugh riot, yet it was amiable and delineated that the evening was a celebration of all the nominees, not just the winners."

=== Ratings and reception ===
The American telecast on ABC drew in an average of 39.92 million people over its length, which was a 2.5% increase from the previous year's ceremony. An estimated 76.72 million total viewers watched all or part of the awards. The show also drew higher Nielsen ratings compared to the previous ceremony with 23.59% of households watching over a 38.86 share. In addition, the program scored a higher 18-49 demo rating with a 14.18 rating over a 33.71 share among viewers in that demographic.

In July 2007, the ceremony presentation received nine nominations at the 59th Primetime Emmys. Two months later, the ceremony won two of those nominations for Outstanding Art Direction (J. Michael Riva, Geoffrey Richman, and Tamlyn Wright) and Outstanding Music Direction (William Ross).

== "In Memoriam" ==
The annual "In Memoriam" tribute, presented by actress Jodie Foster, honored the following people:

- Glenn Ford - Actor
- Bruno Kirby - Character actor, comedian
- Alida Valli - Actress
- Betty Comden – Songwriter
- Jane Wyatt - Actress
- Don Knotts - Actor, comedian
- Red Buttons - Actor, comedian
- Gillo Pontecorvo – Director
- Darren McGavin - Actor
- Richard Fleischer – Director
- Sven Nykvist – Cinematographer
- Joe Barbera – Producer, cartoonist
- Tamara Dobson - Actor, model
- Gretchen Rau – Set designer
- June Allyson - Actress
- Gordon Parks – Director
- Philippe Noiret - Actor
- Maureen Stapleton - Actress
- Jack Wild - Actor
- Vincent Sherman – Director
- James Doohan - Actor
- Shohei Imamura – Director
- Carlo Ponti – Producer
- Peter Boyle - Character actor
- James Glennon – Cinematographer
- Sidney Sheldon – Screenwriter
- Jack Palance - Actor
- Mako - Actor
- Jack Warden - Character actor
- Basil Poledouris – Composer
- Henry Bumstead – Art director
- Jay Presson Allen – Screenwriter
- Robert Altman – Director

Before the montage was shown, Foster briefly eulogized casting director and Oscar winner Randy Stone who died nearly two weeks before the ceremony.

== See also ==
- 13th Screen Actors Guild Awards
- 27th Golden Raspberry Awards
- 49th Grammy Awards
- 59th Primetime Emmy Awards
- 60th British Academy Film Awards
- 61st Tony Awards
- 64th Golden Globe Awards
- List of submissions to the 79th Academy Awards for Best Foreign Language Film

== Bibliography ==
- Terrance, Vincent (2013). Television Specials: 5,336 Entertainment Programs, 1936–2012 (5 ed.). Jefferson, North Carolina, United States: Ballantine Books, McFarland & Company. ISBN 978-1-4766-1240-9. OCLC 844373010.
