= I Am Legend (soundtrack) =

I Am Legend (Original Motion Picture Soundtrack)

Film score by James Newton Howard
- Released: January 15, 2008
- Recorded: 2007
- Studio: Sony Scoring Stage, Sony Pictures Studios, culver City, California; Newman Scoring Stage, 20th Century Fox Studios, Los Angeles; Henson Recording Studios, Hollywood; Remote Control Productions, Santa Monica, California; James Newton Howard Studios, Santa Monica, California
- Genre: Film score
- Length: 44:27
- Label: Varèse Sarabande
- Producer: James Newton Howard; Jim Weidman

James Newton Howard chronology
Charlie Wilson's War (2007)	I Am Legend (2007)	The Great Debaters (2007)

I Am Legend (Original Motion Picture Soundtrack) is the film score to the 2007 film I Am Legend directed by Francis Lawrence starring Will Smith. The film score is composed by James Newton Howard and released through Varèse Sarabande label on January 15, 2008.

== Track listing ==
No.	Title	Length
1.	"My Name is Robert Neville"	2:51
2.	"Deer Hunting"	1:17
3.	"Evacuation"	4:26
4.	"Scan Her Again"	1:41
5.	"Darkseeker Dogs"	2:17
6.	"Sam's Gone"	1:45
7.	"Talk to Me"	0:55
8.	"The Pier"	5:17
9.	"Can They Do That?"	2:09
10.	"I'm Listening"	2:09
11.	"The Jagged Edge"	5:16
12.	"Reunited"	7:50
13.	"I'm Sorry"	2:21
14.	"Epilogue"	4:13
Total length:		44:27

== Reception ==
Jonathan Broxton of Movie Music UK wrote "what's here is solid enough, and kudos to the film for being willing to go score-less." Thomas Glorieux of Maintitles wrote "It is strange that the entire score on disc is a wonderful collection of elegiac emotional soaring cues. While this release is nothing like a representation nor recommendation of the effect in the movie, it's strange to consider that both work very well when separated. In the film the non musical scenes are effective and heavy. On disc the unused music serves up another Newton Howard winner. Together I Am Legend is simply wonderful." Thomas Simpson of Soundtrack.Net wrote "This album has the ability to play with your emotions long after you hear it [...] It's everything a film could want for a closer, bringing everything back into a nice little package, making a full circle from where it started."

Christian Clemmensen of Filmtracks wrote "It's a compelling score without a true home, and it's difficult to figure why Howard and Lawrence could not have better planned the score to take advantage of the sound effects and sequences of silence from the start. Perhaps the two will get a chance to better plan the employment of music in the announced prequel to I Am Legend that was put into early production not long after the fiscal success of the concept's resurrection." James Leonard of AllMusic wrote "[Howard's] music evokes and enhances the film's terror and loneliness as well as its central character's ultimate sacrifice with tremendous success. But, more than that, in some cues [Howard's] score does stand on its own as music, creating the same emotional effects as the film but without needing the film to explain them. The aching tone of the Epilogue, for instance, combined with distinctive harmonies, conjures a tangible sense of stoic heroism."

Kirk Honeycutt of The Hollywood Reporter wrote "James Newton Howard's magisterial score, create a New York City that is a literally an urban jungle." Scott Renshaw of Charleston City Paper wrote "the film as a whole stays fairly quiet, including spare use of James Newton Howard's score." Todd McCarthy of Variety and Jenna Wortham of Wired "ethereal" and "exciting". Glen Chapman of Den of Geek wrote "There are, of course, action themes here too, which are incredibly well handled and elevate the material, and overall, this counts as one of Howard's very best scores to date."

== Additional music ==
The film also features four Bob Marley songs: "Redemption Song", "Three Little Birds", "Buffalo Soldier" and "Stir It Up".

== Personnel ==
Credits adapted from liner notes:

Production

- Composer – James Newton Howard
- Producer – James Newton Howard, Jim Weidman
- Recording and mixing – Alan Meyerson, Joel Iwataki
- Mastering – Patricia Sullivan Fourstar
- Music editors – Jim Weidman, David Olson
- Scoring coordinators – Julia Newmann, Pamela Sollie
- Copyist – JoAnn Kane Music Service
- Music librarian – Andrew Hauschild, Mark Graham
- Scoring crew – Adam Michalak, Greg Vines, Kevin Globerman, Mark Eshelman, Vincent Cirilli
- Technical score advisors – Chris P. Bacon, Dave Holden, Stuart Michael Thomas
- Executive producer – Robert Townson
- Music business affairs for Warner Bros. Pictures – Dirk Hebert, Keith Zajic
- Executive in charge of music for Warner Bros. Pictures – Carter Armstrong, Doug Frank, Gary LeMel

Orchestra

- Orchestra – Hollywood Studio Symphony
- Orchestrators – Brad Dechter, Jeff Atmajian, Jon Kull, Pete Anthony
- Orchestra conductor – Chris P. Bacon, Pete Anthony
- Orchestra contractor – Peter Rotter, Sandy De Crescent
- Orchestra leader and concertmaster – Roger Wilkie

Instrumentalists

- Bass – Ann Atkinson, Bruce Morgenthaler, Chris Kollgaard, David Parmeter, Don Ferrone, Drew Dembowski, Ed Meares, Mike Valerio, Neil Garber, Nico Abondolo, Nico Philippon, Oscar Hidalgo, Sue Ranney, Tim Eckert
- Bassoon – Michael O'Donovan, Peter Mandell, Rose Corrigan
- Celesta – Mike Lang
- Cello – Andrew Shulman, Armen Ksajikian, Cecilia Tsan, Chris Ermacoff, Dave Speltz, Dennis Karmazyn, Doug Davis, Erika Duke-Kirkpatrick, Kim Scholes, Paul Cohen, Paula Hochhalter, Rowena Hammill, Sebastian Toettcher, Steve Erdody, Tim Landauer, Trevor Handy
- Clarinet – Don Foster, Mike Grego, Ralph Williams
- Flute – Geri Rotella, Jim Walker
- Harp – Jo Ann Turovsky
- Horn – Brian O'Connor, Daniel Kelley, David Duke, Jim Thatcher, John Reynolds, Paul Klintworth, Phil Yao, Rick Todd, Steve Becknell, Suzette Moriarty, Todd Miller
- Oboe – Barbara Northcutt, Ralph Northcutt, Tom Boyd
- Percussion – Alan Estes, Bob Zimmitti, Dan Greco, Greg Goodall, Mike Fisher, Wade Culbreath
- Piano – Randy Kerber
- Timpani – Peter Limonick
- Trombone – Alan Kaplan, Andy Malloy, Bill Reichenbach, George Thatcher, Bill Booth
- Trumpet – Dave Washburn, Jon Lewis, Malcolm McNab, Marissa Benedict, Rob Frear, Tim Morrison, Malcolm McNab, Tim Morrison
- Tuba – Doug Tornquist, Jim Self
- Viola – Andrew Duckles, Andrew Picken, Brian Dembow, Carole Castillo, Darrin McCann, David Walther, Denyse Buffum, Janet Lakatos, Jennie Hansen, Karie Prescott, Keith Greene, Marlow Fisher, Matt Funes, Mike Nowak, Pam Goldsmith, Rick Gerding, Robert Berg, Robert Brophy, Roland Kato, Sam Formicola, Shanti Randall, Shawn Mann, Steve Gordon, Thomas Diener, Vicki Miskolczy
- Violin – Agnes Gottschewski, Aimee Kreston, Alan Grunfeld, Alyssa Park, Amy Hershberger, Ana Landauer, Anatoly Rosinsky, Armen Anassian, Bruce Dukov, Daniel Lewin, Darius Campo, Dimitrie Leivici, Endre Granat, Eric Hosler, Eun-Mee Ahn, Ge-Fang Yang, Haim Shtrum, Helen Nightengale, Henry Gronnier, Irina Voloshina, Ishani Bhoola, Jackie Brand, Jay Rosen, Jeanne Skrocki, Joel Pargman, Josefina Vergara, Katia Popov, Ken Yerke, Kevin Connolly, Liane Mautner, Lisa Sutton, Lorand Lokuszta, Marc Sazer, Mario DeLeon, Michele Richards, Miran Kojian, Miwako Watanabe, Natalie Leggett, Neil Samples, Nina Evtuhov, Phillip Levy, Radu Pieptea, Rafael Rishik, Raymond Kobler, Richard Altenbach, Roberto Cani, Sara Parkins, Sarah Thornblade, Serena McKinney, Shalini Vijayan, Songa Lee, Sungil Lee, Tammy Hatwan, Tereza Stanislav, Julie Gigante

Choir

- Choir – Hollywood Film Chorale
- Choir conductor – Grant Gershon
- Choir contractor – Sally Stevens

Vocalists

- Alto – Aleta Braxton, Ann White, Carmen Twillie, Christy Crowl, Cindy Bourquin, Donna Medine, Joan Beal, Melissa Mackay, Susan Boyd Joyce
- Bass-baritone – Alvin Chea, Bill Edwards, Bob Joyce, Drew Harrah, Eric Bradley, Guy Maeda, Jon Joyce, Jules Green, Kerry Katz, Michael Geiger, Reid Bruton, Royce Reynolds, Stephen Grimm
- Countertenor – Daniel Bubeck, Dan Roihl, Steven Rickards
- Soprano – Diane Reynolds, Jenny Graham, Joanna Bushnell, Linda Harmon, Samela Beasom, Susie Stevens-Logan, Teri Koide, Virenia Lind, Sally Stevens
- Solo vocals – Grant Gershon
- Tenor – Agostino Castagnola, David Joyce, Fletcher Sheridan, George Sterne, Gerald White, Jonathan Mack, Rick Logan, Steven Harms, Walt Harrah

== Accolades ==
Award	Date of ceremony	Category	Recipients	Result
World Soundtrack Awards	October 18, 2008	Soundtrack Composer of the Year	James Newton Howard (Note: also for Charlie Wilson's War and Michael Clayton)	Won
