= I Am Legend =

I Am Legend may refer to:

- I Am Legend (novel), a 1954 novel by Richard Matheson
  - I Am Legend (film), the 2007 film based on the 1954 novel, starring Will Smith and Alice Braga
    - I Am Legend (soundtrack)
- "I Am Legend" (song), on White Zombie's 1992 album La Sexorcisto: Devil Music Volume One
- I Am Legend (TV series), a 2010 South Korean drama, starring Kim Jung-eun and Lee Joon-hyuk
