= Sally Stevens =

American singer

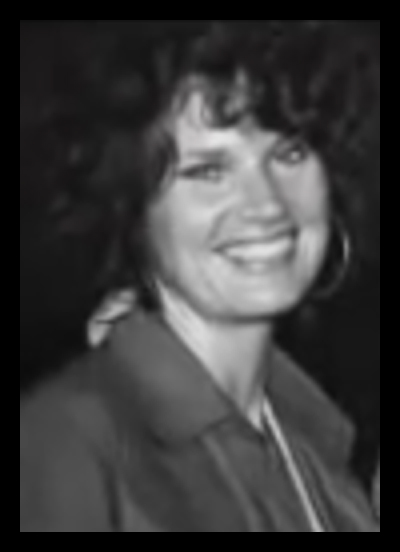
- Sally Stevens

Background information
- Born: Los Angeles, California, U.S.
- Genre: Film score
- Occupations: Singer, actress
- Instrument: Vocals
- Years active: 1957-present

Sally Stevens is an American actress, singer and a vocal contractor. She has sung on hundreds of The Simpsons episodes, and sings the main title, which has been in use since the inception of the show. She also sings the main title for Family Guy and has worked for Seth MacFarlane, the creator of the show, as vocal contractor and singer since the inception of the series on Fox in 1999. She has sung, and been vocal contractor for hundreds of films, some of which include The Last Airbender, The Abyss, Contact, Amistad, Power of One, Behind Enemy Lines, Beyond Borders, Forrest Gump, and Indiana Jones and the Kingdom of the Crystal Skull. Sally Stevens is the mother of session singer Susie Stevens-Logan. She did the voices of Marge and Patty in the demo recording of "Dancing Workers Song".

More recent projects included singing and vocal contractor services for Night at the Museum: Secret of the Tomb, for Alan Silvestri, composer (2014). She also contracted the male choir for Thomas Newman, for the Steven Spielberg film Bridge of Spies, (2015) and the male choir for John Williams' score on Star Wars: The Force Awakens (2016) and Finding Dory (Thomas Newman, composer). In 2018, she contracted and sang for Tyler Bates' score for Deadpool 2. Stevens sang for vocal contractor Bobbi Page on the scores for Tomorrowland and Jurassic World, for composer Michael Giacchino (2015). Also sang for vocal contractor Edie Lehmann on recording sessions for Richard Carpenter in 2018.

== Life and career ==
Stevens was born in Los Angeles, California, United States, and attended UCLA as a music major. She worked as a production singer in Las Vegas with bookings in 1961 and 1962, then began to work freelance in recording and commercials in Los Angeles. She sang on the Danny Kaye Variety Show two seasons, and The Carol Burnett Show and The Smothers Brothers Comedy Hour.

Her first work in film scoring was in 1962, How the West was Won, then continuing, Doctor Zhivago and The Sound of Music. Other solo performances in film include The Secret of NIMH (composer Jerry Goldsmith), Exorcist II: The Heretic (composer Ennio Morricone) and Butch Cassidy and the Sundance Kid (Burt Bacharach, composer). In 1979–82 she was the on-camera spokesperson for KBIG Radio, a Los Angeles radio/music station. She is a freelance artist/session singer and vocal contractor. As a solo artist, she was greatly influenced by Peggy Lee. She has written lyrics for film and television projects, and her song, written with Dave Grusin, "Who Comes This Night" is included in James Taylor's first Christmas CD, recorded in 2005.

During the late 1960s and 1970s, she worked extensively in records and commercials. She has recorded with Frank Sinatra, Andy Williams, Country Joe and the Fish, Burt Bacharach, Gary Puckett & The Union Gap, Paul Revere & The Raiders, Sonny & Cher, The Hollyridge Strings, Neil Diamond, Ray Conniff, Dean Martin, Tom Scott, Gabor Szabo, Hugo Montenegro, Ennio Morricone, Percy Faith, Gino Vannelli, Wayne Newton, Michael Bublé, and many others. During this period, she was one of a group of singers for Los Angeles radio station KBIG, which at the time was playing the format for which the now-iHeart Media owned station is best remembered, Beautiful music. She also served as on-air promotional spokesperson for that station.

Stevens was the lead vocalist on "Tomorrow's Child", the theme song for Spaceship Earth at Walt Disney World's EPCOT Center from 1986 until 1994.

Stevens is also the director of the Hollywood Film Chorale. She was also the choral director of the Oscars broadcasts for over 20 years, the most recent broadcast being the 2018 Academy Awards. She also contracted singers and sang for the 70th Emmy Awards Broadcast, 2018.

Sally Stevens is also a writer, and has had short fiction and poetry published in The OffBeat, Between the Pages Anthology "Fairy Tales and Folklore Re-imagined", MockingHeart Review, Raven's Perch, Funny in Five Hundred, Hermeneutic Chaos Literary Journal, and podcast No Extra Words.

Stevens is also a fine art photographer, and has had five solo Fine Art Black & White Photography exhibits in Los Angeles. Some of her photographs of film composers were included in an exhibit at Cite de la Musique, in Paris, France, 2013.

She served on the local and national boards of AFTRA for over 40 years, on the board of Screen Actors Guild for 18 years, was a trustee of NARAS, and is currently a national trustee of the AFTRA Health & Retirement Funds.
