= Glasgow Cosmic =

Glasgow based franchise cricket team in European T20 Premier League (ETPL)

- Official logo of Glasgow Cosmic
- Nickname: The Cosmic
- League: European T20 Premier League

Personnel
- Captain: George Munsey
- Coach: Matthew Hayden
- Owner: Matthew Hayden, Tansha Batra, Mugafi Group

Team information
- City: Glasgow, Scotland
- Colours: Dark Navy, Cyan, Bright Royal Blue, White
- Founded: April 20, 2026; 6 months ago

History
- ETPL wins: 0
- Official website: glasgowcosmic.com

Glasgow Cosmic is a Scottish professional Twenty20 franchise cricket team based in Glasgow, Scotland. The team competes in the European T20 Premier League (ETPL).

The Cosmic were announced as one of the league's six inaugural franchises on 20 April 2026, and represent Scotland in the ETPL alongside the Edinburgh Castle Rockers.

The franchise is owned by a consortium consisting of former Australian opening batter Matthew Hayden, Indian businesswoman Tansha Batra, and the Mugafi Group, an India-based entertainment and sports business.

The franchise was initially introduced under the name "Glasgow Mugafians," with West Indies cricketer Chris Gayle announced as part of the ownership group. Gayle subsequently exited the franchise, with Hayden replacing him as co-owner ahead of the inaugural season.

== History ==
=== Formation ===
The Glasgow Cosmic were established as part of the inaugural European T20 Premier League, a competition first conceived in 2019 by the cricket boards of Ireland, Scotland, and the Netherlands. The franchise was officially unveiled on 20 April 2026 at an event in Glasgow, where Chris Gayle and the Mugafi Group were announced as the owners, completing the league's six-team structure. The team later rebranded to "Glasgow Cosmic" ahead of the inaugural season.

In June 2026, Matthew Hayden was announced as co-owner and head coach, replacing Chris Gayle in the ownership group. Hayden said his decision to join the project was driven by a request from Mugafi Group chairman Vipul Agrawal and co-owner Tansha Batra.

=== Coaching staff ===
In June 2026, former Australian opening batter and two-time World Cup winner Matthew Hayden was appointed as co-owner and head coach of the franchise. Hayden stated that he accepted the role because of the franchise's long-term vision.

Matthew Mott, former head coach of England's white-ball team from 2022 to 2024, was appointed as assistant coach, working alongside Hayden.

In June 2026, former Indian fast bowler Varun Aaron was appointed as bowling coach.

=== 2026: Inaugural season ===
The Cosmic assembled a strong squad ahead of the inaugural 2026 season, featuring a mix of international stars and Scottish talent. New Zealand opener Finn Allen, English all-rounder Liam Livingstone, Australian wicketkeeper-batter Josh Philippe, Sri Lankan all-rounder Kamindu Mendis, South African spinner Keshav Maharaj and fast bowler Lungi Ngidi were among the major overseas signings. Namibian all-rounder Gerhard Erasmus, South African left-arm quick Duan Jansen and American fast bowler Ali Khan also joined the squad. Scotland internationals Richie Berrington and George Munsey formed part of the core Scottish contingent, while former Australia all-rounder Moises Henriques was included as a European local player after switching his international affiliation to Portugal. Scottish internationals Brad Currie, Matthew Cross, Michael Leask, Oliver Davidson and Chris McBride, alongside Dutch all-rounder Paul van Meekeren, were selected during the inaugural player draft to complete the squad.

Ahead of the inaugural season opener, the team announced it would be led by Scotland George Munsey and coached by Matthew Hayden.

Glasgow began their inaugural campaign with a 7-wicket defeat to Edinburgh Castle Rockers This was followed by a 33-run win over Dublin Guardians in their second game a 5-wicket defeat to Rotterdam Dockers a 7-wicket defeat to Amsterdam Flames a 26-run defeat to Belfast Wolves a 7-wicket defeat to Edinburgh Castle Rockers

The ETPL is heading to Malahide Cricket Ground in Malahide, Ireland and the second half is ready to begin. a 31-runs defeat to Rotterdam Dockers a 6-wicket win over Dublin Guardians a 103-run defeat to Belfast Wolves Glassgow completed their league campaign with a 5-wicket defeat to Amsterdam Flames.

== Players ==
=== Squad ===
On 24 May 2026, the franchise announced a squad featuring international players and Scottish talent. The squad includes New Zealand opener Finn Allen, English batting all-rounder Liam Livingstone, Australian wicket-keeper Josh Philippe, Sri Lankan all-rounder Kamindu Mendis, South African spinner Keshav Maharaj, South African fast bowler Lungi Ngidi, Namibian all-rounder Gerhard Erasmus, South African left-arm quick Duan Jansen, American fast bowler Ali Khan, and Scotland captain Richie Berrington.

The franchise also signed Scottish international George Munsey, an opening batter. Former Australia all-rounder Moises Henriques is set to feature as a European local player for Glasgow, having switched his international affiliation to Portugal.

=== Draft acquisitions ===
The inaugural player draft took place on 2 July 2026, with all six franchises selecting local players from the three organising nations through a snake-draft format. Each franchise was required to select a minimum of six and a maximum of eight players from the draft pool, with salaries ranging from $20,000 to $55,000 depending on draft position.

Scottish internationals Brad Currie, Matthew Cross, Michael Leask, Oliver Davidson, and Christopher McBride, alongside Dutch all-rounder Paul van Meekeren, were selected by the Cosmic during the draft.

== Current squad ==
- Players with international caps are listed in **bold**.

Glasgow Cosmic roster
No.	Name	Nationality	Birth date	Batting style	Bowling style	Notes
Batters
—	**Finn Allen**	New Zealand	22 April 1999 (age 27)	Right-handed	—	Overseas player
—	**Richie Berrington**	Scotland	3 April 1987 (age 39)	Right-handed	Right-arm medium-fast	Affiliated local player
—	**George Munsey (c)**	Scotland	21 February 1993 (age 33)	Left-handed	Right-arm medium	Affiliated local player
—	**Chris McBride**	Scotland	26 June 1999 (age 27)	Right-handed	Right-arm medium	Affiliated local player; Drafted
All-rounders
—	**Liam Livingstone**	England	4 August 1993 (age 33)	Right-handed	Right-arm off break	Overseas player
—	**Gerhard Erasmus**	Namibia	11 April 1995 (age 31)	Right-handed	Right-arm off break	Associate player
—	**Kamindu Mendis**	Sri Lanka	30 September 1998 (age 28)	Left-handed	Right-arm off break	Overseas player
—	**Michael Leask**	Scotland	29 October 1990 (age 36)	Right-handed	Right-arm off break	Affiliated local player; Drafted
—	**Moises Henriques**	Portugal	1 February 1987 (age 39)	Right-handed	Right-arm medium	European associate player
Wicket-keepers
—	**Josh Philippe**	Australia	1 June 1997 (age 29)	Right-handed	—	Overseas player
—	**Matthew Cross**	Scotland	15 October 1992 (age 34)	Right-handed	—	Affiliated local player; Drafted
Bowlers
—	**Keshav Maharaj**	South Africa	7 February 1990 (age 36)	Right-handed	Slow left-arm orthodox	Overseas player
—	**Lungi Ngidi**	South Africa	29 March 1996 (age 30)	Right-handed	Right-arm fast-medium	Overseas player
—	Duan Jansen	South Africa	1 May 2000 (age 26)	Right-handed	Left-arm fast	Overseas player
—	**Ali Khan**	United States	13 December 1990 (age 35)	Right-handed	Right-arm fast-medium	Associate player
—	**Brad Currie**	Scotland	8 November 1998 (age 27)	Right-handed	Left-arm medium-fast	Affiliated local player; Drafted
—	**Paul van Meekeren**	Netherlands	15 January 1993 (age 33)	Right-handed	Right-arm fast-medium	Local player; Drafted
—	**Oliver Davidson**	Scotland	28 July 2004 (age 22)	Left-handed	Slow left-arm orthodox	Affiliated local player; Drafted

== Seasons ==
=== Summaries ===
Season	W–L	Pos.	Finals	Coach	Captain	Most runs	Most wickets	Refs
2026	2–8	6th	DNQ	Matthew Hayden	George Munsey	George Munsey (294)	Liam Livingstone (9)	

=== Tournament finishes ===
Year	League standing	Final standing
2026	6th out of 6	League stage

- C: champions
- RU: runner-up
- SF team qualified for the semi-final stage of the competition

=== Statistics ===
Year	Played	Wins	Losses	Tied/NR (Note: NR indicates "no result"; abandoned matches are indicated as no result.)
2026	10	2	8	0

== Administration and support staff ==
Position	Name
Owner	Matthew Hayden, Tansha Batra, Mugafi Group
Head coach	Matthew Hayden
Assistant coach	Matthew Mott
Bowling coach	Varun Aaron
Fielding coach	Donovan Miller
