= Oliver Davidson =

Scottish cricketer

Personal information
- Full name: Oliver Forbes Davidson
- Born: 28 July 2004 (age 22); Edinburgh, Scotland
- Batting: Left-handed
- Bowling: Slow left arm orthodox
- Role: Bowler
- Relatives: Jasper Davidson (brother)

International information
- National side: Scotland
- ODI debut (cap 73): 3 June 2022 v UAE
- Last ODI: 13 August 2026 v Canada
- T20I debut (cap 67): 7 February 2026 v West Indies
- Last T20I: 17 April 2026 v Namibia

Domestic team information
- Years: Team
- 2022: Worcestershire
- 2026: Glasgow Cosmic

Career statistics
| Competition | ODI | T20I | LA | T20 |
|---|---|---|---|---|
| Matches | 9 | 6 | 11 | 12 |
| Runs scored | 34 | 37 | 40 | 45 |
| Batting average | 11.33 | 18.50 | 13.33 | 9.00 |
| 100s/50s | 0/0 | 0/0 | 0/0 | 0/0 |
| Top score | 14 | 20* | 14 | 20* |
| Balls bowled | 396 | 108 | 480 | 210 |
| Wickets | 7 | 5 | 8 | 8 |
| Bowling average | 46.00 | 26.60 | 52.75 | 35.50 |
| 5 wickets in innings | 0 | 0 | 0 | 0 |
| 10 wickets in match | 0 | 0 | 0 | 0 |
| Best bowling | 2/28 | 1/12 | 2/28 | 2/31 |
| Catches/stumpings | 6/– | 1/– | 6/– | 4/– |
- Source: ESPNcricinfo, 25 September 2026

Oliver Forbes Davidson (born 28 July 2004) is a Scottish cricketer.

== Career ==
While an academy player at Worcestershire, Davidson represented Scotland national under-19s at the ICC Under-19 World Cup European qualification tournament in September 2021, where he took 14 wickets. He went on to represent Scotland at the 2022 ICC Under-19 Cricket World Cup in January 2022.

In May 2022, Davidson was selected in Scotland's squad for the 2022 United States Tri-Nation series, which was the twelfth round of the 2019–2023 ICC Cricket World Cup League 2. He made his One Day International (ODI) debut for Scotland against the United Arab Emirates national cricket team on 3 June 2022.
