= Brad Currie =

Scottish cricketer (born 1998)

Personal information
- Full name: Bradley James Currie
- Born: 8 November 1998 (age 28); Poole, Dorset, England
- Height: 186 cm (6 ft 1 in)
- Batting: Right-handed
- Bowling: Left-arm medium-fast
- Role: Bowler
- Relatives: Scott Currie (brother); Dean Hawkshaw (cousin)

International information
- National side: Scotland (2023-present)
- ODI debut (cap 78): 1 March 2024 v Canada
- Last ODI: 18 May 2026 v Nepal
- T20I debut (cap 54): 20 July 2023 v Germany
- Last T20I: 17 February 2026 v Nepal

Domestic team information
- Years: Team
- 2022–2026: Sussex (squad no. 12)
- 2026: Glasgow Cosmic

Career statistics
Competition	ODI	T20I	FC	LA
Matches	17	22	6	29
Runs scored	16	19	17	38
Batting average	16.00	9.50	4.25	12.66
100s/50s	0/0	0/0	0/0	0/0
Top score	8*	8*	7	18*
Balls bowled	743	450	964	1,277
Wickets	37	32	24	52
Bowling average	14.13	13.78	26.25	19.44
5 wickets in innings	0	1	1	0
10 wickets in match	0	0	0	0
Best bowling	4/26	5/13	6/93	4/26
Catches/stumpings	5/–	10/–	1/–	8/–
- Source: ESPNcricinfo, 25 May 2026

Bradley James Currie (born 8 November 1998) is a Scottish cricketer.

== Career ==
Currie made his first-class debut on 19 July 2022, for Sussex in the 2022 County Championship, taking bowling figures of 6/93 on his debut at Lord's. He made his List A debut on 2 August 2022, for Sussex in the 2022 Royal London One-Day Cup.

In May 2022, he was named in Scotland's squad as a travelling reserve player for the 2022 United States Tri-Nation Series.

In May 2024, he was named in Scotland’s squad for the 2024 ICC Men's T20 World Cup tournament.
