= The Good Shepherd (film) =

2006 spy film directed by Robert De Niro

- Theatrical release poster
- Directed by: Robert De Niro
- Written by: Eric Roth
- Produced by: James G. Robinson; Jane Rosenthal; Robert De Niro
- Starring: Matt Damon; Angelina Jolie; Alec Baldwin; Joe Pesci; Tammy Blanchard; Billy Crudup; Keir Dullea; Martina Gedeck; William Hurt; Timothy Hutton; Lee Pace; Eddie Redmayne; John Sessions; Oleg Stefan; John Turturro; Robert De Niro
- Cinematography: Robert Richardson
- Edited by: Tariq Anwar
- Music by: Bruce Fowler; Marcelo Zarvos
- Production companies: Morgan Creek Productions; TriBeCa Productions; American Zoetrope
- Distributed by: Universal Pictures (North America and select international territories); Morgan Creek International (International)
- Release date: December 22, 2006
- Running time: 167 minutes
- Country: United States
- Language: English
- Budget: $80 million
- Box office: $100.3 million

The Good Shepherd is a 2006 American spy film produced and directed by Robert De Niro, and starring Matt Damon, Angelina Jolie, and De Niro, supported by an extensive ensemble cast. The film follows Edward Wilson, a fictional counterintelligence officer, from 1939 to 1961 as the CIA develops and grows around him.

Wilson (played by Damon), a senior CIA officer, discovers a mole in his department following the disastrous Bay of Pigs invasion of 1961. The film delves into Wilson's complex life starting from his college years at Yale in 1939, his initiation into the Skull and Bones fraternity, and his recruitment into intelligence work during World War II. His personal life is marked by a strained marriage to Margaret "Clover" Russell (played by Jolie) and by a series of affairs, which underscore the sacrifices and moral compromises invited by espionage work. The narrative unfolds through a mix of sequential events and flashbacks, exploring the origins of the CIA, Wilson's involvement in key historical events, and the personal tolls typical in careers dedicated to secret intelligence.

The film was released on December 22, 2006 by Universal Pictures in North America and by Morgan Creek International in international markets, to mixed reviews. It grossed $100 million against an estimated $80 million production budget.

== Plot ==
In 1939, Edward Wilson studies poetry at Yale University and is invited to join the Skull and Bones secret society. During an initiation ceremony, he reveals that as a child he discovered a suicide note left by his father, Admiral Thomas Wilson, but says he has never read it. Richard Hayes, one of the society's leaders, tells him of a rumor that Edward's father was going to be appointed to serve as Secretary of the Navy until his loyalty came under question, adding that he hopes there will be no problem with Edward's loyalty.

FBI agent Sam Murach recruits Edward to investigate his thesis advisor, Dr. Fredericks, suspected of belonging to a subversive Nazi organization. Fredericks resigns in disgrace as a result of the evidence Edward uncovers, although Edward later learns that he was actually a British spy who had infiltrated the organization.

Edward begins dating Laura, a fellow Yale student who is deaf, but at a party, he meets and has sex with Margaret "Clover" Russell, the sister of another Skull and Bones member. On learning that Margaret is pregnant, he realizes he must marry her.

Edward is recruited by General Bill Sullivan to work in a newly formed foreign intelligence service. During World War II, he works in London, where he becomes an expert in counterespionage. In post-war Berlin, Edward collaborates with his Soviet counterpart "Ulysses" in an exchange of captured German scientists.

In 1946, Edward returns home to Washington, DC, where he is reunited with Margaret and meets his son, Edward Jr., for the first time. He is approached by Sullivan to help create the CIA with Hayes, under Director Phillip Allen. Margaret grows increasingly frustrated as Edward continually prioritizes work over family. Edward runs into Laura, and they spend a passionate evening together; Margaret receives compromising photographs of them and publicly berates Edward, who breaks off the affair with Laura.

Valentin Mironov, a high-ranking KGB defector, gives Edward information about Ulysses, including that he is greatly interested in Fidel Castro. Another Soviet defector claims to be the real Mironov and accuses the first Mironov of being a double agent. Beaten, waterboarded and administered liquid LSD as a truth serum, the newcomer ridicules his interrogators and jumps out a window. Edward eventually discovers evidence that Mironov is in fact a double agent.

Edward Jr. follows in his father's footsteps in attending Yale and joining Skull and Bones. He tells Edward he wants to join the CIA, which Margaret opposes. In an argument with Margaret, Edward blurts out that he only married her because she was pregnant. Margaret begs him to protect their son, which he promises to do. She eventually leaves Edward to live with her mother.

In 1961, Edward is responsible for planning the Bay of Pigs invasion, and Edward Jr. overhears his father discussing it. The invasion ends disastrously. Edward realizes there may be a "mole" in his office. Returning home, he finds an envelope containing a blurry photograph of a man and woman in bed, as well as audio tapes that have been tampered with. Ulysses plays an intact copy of the recording for Edward, who hears Edward Jr. telling his lover Miriam, a Soviet operative, what he knew about the invasion.

Ulysses offers to protect Edward Jr. if Edward becomes a double agent. Edward confronts his son, who refuses to believe that Miriam is a spy and reveals that he has asked her to marry him. Edward declines Ulysses' offer but implicitly agrees that Miriam is a threat to both sides. En route to her wedding, Miriam is thrown to her death from a plane. A devastated Edward Jr. reveals she was pregnant.

After Philip Allen resigns in disgrace for having embezzled money for years, the President names Hayes as the new CIA Director, and Hayes appoints Edward to be the agency's head of counterintelligence.

Edward finally reads the suicide note in which his father admits to betraying his country, apologizes to his wife, and urges his son to be a good and courageous man; Edward burns it.

== Cast ==
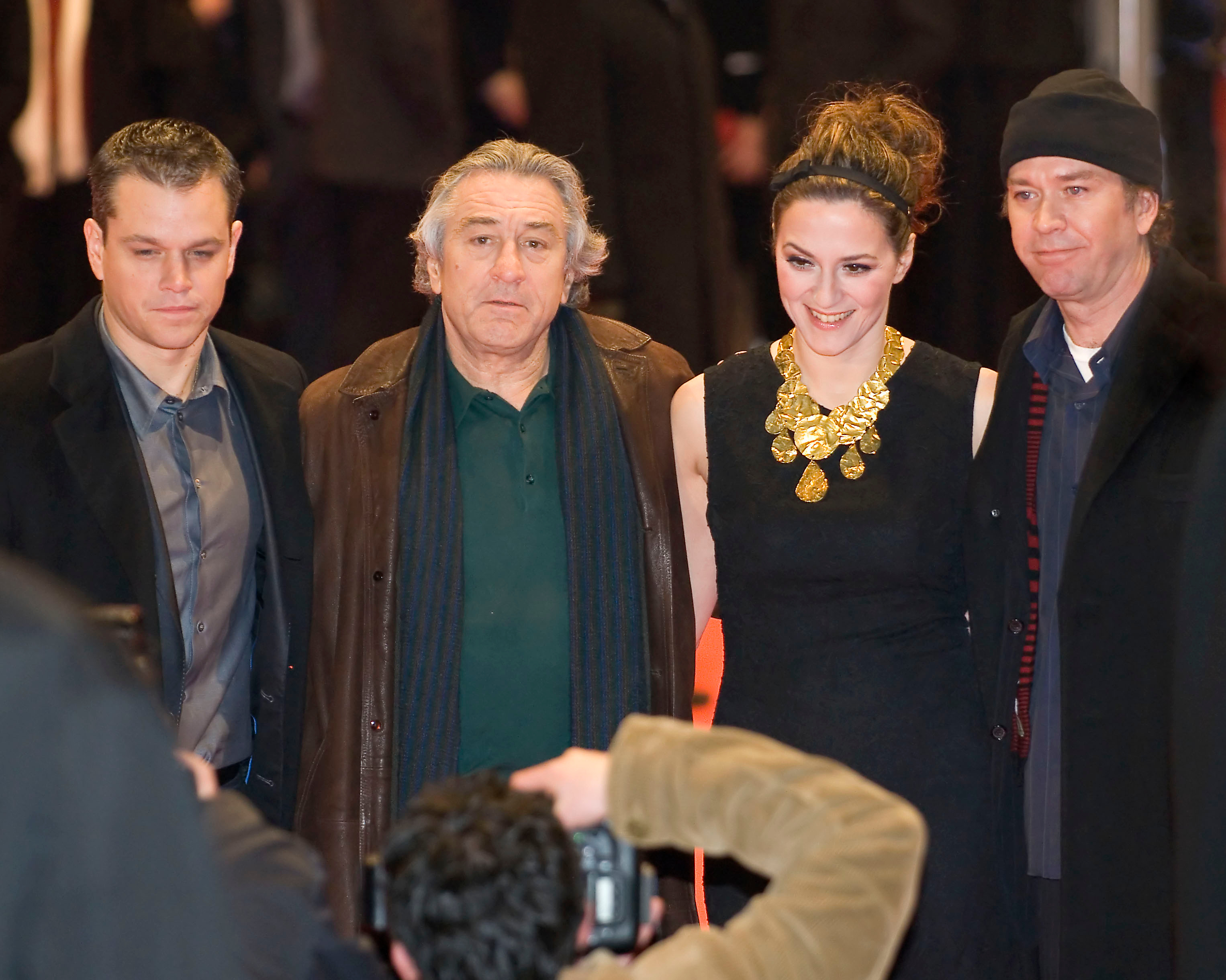
Damon, De Niro, Gedeck and Hutton at the February 2007 premiere of the film in Berlin

- Matt Damon as Edward Wilson Sr. He is the film's main character. He is based mainly on Allen Dulles but also with aspects of James Jesus Angleton and covert operations specialist Richard Bissell. His false identity in Britain was "Mr. Carlson".
- Angelina Jolie as Margaret "Clover" Russell who is based on Martha "Clover" Todd, the wife of Allen Dulles.
- Robert De Niro as General Bill Sullivan, based on William J. Donovan.
- Alec Baldwin as FBI Agent Sam Murach.
- William Hurt as CIA Director Philip Allen.
- Joe Pesci as Joseph Palmi, based partly on Sam Giancana and Santo Trafficante Jr. The Good Shepherd marked Joe Pesci's return to acting after eight years since Lethal Weapon 4.
- John Turturro as Ray Brocco, based on Angleton deputy Raymond Rocca.
- Billy Crudup as Archibald "Arch" Cummings, based on British agent Kim Philby. The character was named for poet E.E. Cummings, who was in fact a confidant of Angleton.
- Tammy Blanchard as Laura.
- Michael Gambon as Dr. Fredericks.
- Timothy Hutton as Admiral Thomas Wilson, based on James Forrestal.
- John Sessions as Valentin Mironov #1 / Yuri Modin, based on Anatoliy Golitsyn, and on Yuri Modin, the 'legman' KGB operative controlling the 'Cambridge Five'.
- Keir Dullea as Senator John Russell Sr.
- Martina Gedeck as Hanna Schiller.
- Gabriel Macht as John Russell Jr.
- Lee Pace as Deputy Director Richard Hayes, based on Richard Helms.
- Eddie Redmayne as Older Edward Wilson Jr.
- Tommy Nelson as Edward Jr., aged 6–7
- Mark Ivanir as Valentin Mironov #2, based on Yuri Nosenko.
- Oleg Stefan as Stas Siyanko / Ulysses.
- Liya Kebede as Miriam.

== Production ==
=== Development ===
Robert De Niro directed the film and produced it in conjunction with James G. Robinson and Jane Rosenthal. Eric Roth originally wrote the screenplay in 1994 for Francis Ford Coppola and Columbia Pictures. After reading Norman Mailer's Harlot's Ghost, Roth became intrigued by the relations among the people who created the CIA. Coppola ultimately departed from the project, citing his inability to relate to the main characters because of their lack of emotion, but is credited as co-executive producer. Following Coppola's departure, Wayne Wang was tapped to direct, but was in the midst of pre-production location scouting when personnel changes in Columbia's production department ended his involvement.

Columbia's new production team opted to give Roth a list of directors from which to choose, including Philip Kaufman. Kaufman and Roth worked together on the project for a year, overhauling the story's narrative structure and changing it from linear to its final non-linear approach in which the film moves backward and forward in time. Kaufman believed that change would "give it a more contemporary feeling" and helped provide a more cohesive narrative context. He also thought that it provided subtext for the characters' motivations. But, neither this partnership nor the project as conceived survived another dramatic shake-up at the studio. The new studio head halted production because he did not want to make a spy film outside the action genre.

The project languished until John Frankenheimer signed to make the film, with MGM agreeing to purchase the rights. He wanted De Niro to star since they had just worked well together on Ronin. De Niro had been developing his own spy story about the CIA from the time after the Bay of Pigs Invasion to the 1989 fall of the Berlin Wall in 1989 and agreed to appear in the film.

During pre-production in 2002, Frankenheimer died. According to producer Jane Rosenthal, the film had been De Niro's pet project for nine years, but it proved difficult to produce prior to 9/11 and had to compete with the actor's busy schedule in films. The actor said in a 2006 interview just before the film was released, "I had always been interested in the Cold War. I was raised in the Cold War. All of the intelligence stuff was interesting to me." De Niro and Roth had made a deal; if the actor would direct Roth's existing script, Roth would develop De Niro's concept as a screenplay. If The Good Shepherd was commercially successful, their follow-up would be De Niro's 1960s-to-1989 pitch.

De Niro took the project to Universal Pictures, where producer Graham King agreed to help finance the $110 million budget. Initially, they had a deal with Leonardo DiCaprio, who was interested in playing the film's protagonist Edward Wilson. De Niro planned to begin production in early 2005, but DiCaprio had to back out because of his scheduling conflict while filming The Departed for Martin Scorsese. At this point, King and his backers left the project.

De Niro approached Matt Damon, who was also appearing in The Departed but whose time was less than DiCaprio. De Niro would have to wait only six months to do the film with him. Initially, Damon had to turn down De Niro's offer because he was scheduled to shoot Steven Soderbergh's The Informant!. However, after Soderbergh agreed to a delay, Damon could sign on to star as Edward Wilson. James G. Robinson's Morgan Creek Productions agreed to help finance the film with a budget under $90 million. Many of the principal actors, Damon included, would have to waive their usual salaries to keep costs down.

De Niro was not interested in making an action spy movie: "I just like it when things happen for a reason. So I want to downplay the violence, depict it in a muted way. In those days, it was a gentlemen's game." Both he and Roth were also interested in showing how absolute power corrupted the leaders of the CIA. Early in production, De Niro said in an interview, "They tried to do what they thought was right. And then, as they went on, they became overconfident and started doing things that are not always in our best interests."

In preparation for the film, De Niro watched spy films like The Spy Who Came In From the Cold and The Third Man, and the Smiley's People miniseries. He also hired retired CIA officer Milton Bearden to serve as a technical adviser on the film. They had initially worked together on Meet the Parents, in which De Niro played a retired CIA officer.

Bearden agreed to take De Niro through Afghanistan to the north-west frontier of Pakistan and into Moscow for a guided tour of intelligence gathering. Damon also spent time with Bearden, visited several of the locations depicted in the film, and read several books on the CIA. Bearden ensured that the historical aspects were correct even as they were hidden by a fictional approach.

=== Filming ===
Principal photography began on August 18, 2005, with shooting in New York City; Washington, DC, London; and the Dominican Republic. Jeannine Oppewall, who had already been nominated for three Academy Awards for her work, was assigned as art director for The Good Shepherd. She earned a fourth Oscar nomination for Best Art Design on this film.

She conducted such extensive research for the film that her notes filled ten to twelve 6-inch-thick (150 mm) three-ring binders. It took her a week to organize the number of set locations because of the numerous settings in the script, which included Cuba, Léopoldville, London, Guatemala, Moscow, New York City and New Haven.

Although the vast majority of the movie was filmed in New York, the only scenes set there were filmed at the Kirby Hill Estate, on Long Island. As a result, many sets had to be constructed under Oppewall's direction, including a Skull and Bones headquarters and the Berlin set, which was built at the Brooklyn Navy Yard. The interiors of the CIA were built in the Brooklyn Armory, a large building constructed in 1901 for the United States Cavalry. She visited the CIA headquarters in Washington, DC, and worked with Bearden to create sets to portray CIA offices and its Technical and Communications rooms.

Because the lead character, Edward Wilson, originally aspired to be a poet, Oppewall incorporated many visually poetic symbols into the sets of the film, including numerous mirrors to represent the duplicity of the CIA, full-rigged ships as symbols of state, and eagles, used ironically in complex situations such as suspect interrogations. Her team tracked down furnishings for sets and found authentic Teletype machines, reel-to-reel tape recorders, and radios that were used in the CIA during that time.

=== Music ===
The music for the film was largely composed by Bruce Fowler and Marcelo Zarvos. They replaced James Horner, who left the project for creative differences.

The violin solo is an excerpt from Tchaikovsky's Violin Concerto In D. The soundtrack CD mistakenly attributes the solo to Marcelo Zarvos.

== Release and reception ==
=== Box office ===
The Good Shepherd was released on December 22, 2006, in 2,215 theaters, grossing $9.9 million in its opening weekend. Ultimately, it grossed $100,266,865 worldwide.

=== Critical response ===
On review aggregation website Rotten Tomatoes, the film holds an approval rating of 56% based on 172 reviews, with an average rating of 6.14/10. The site's critics consensus states: "Though ambitious and confidently directed by Robert De Niro, The Good Shepherd is ultimately a tedious drama that holds few surprises and succumbs to self-seriousness." At Metacritic the film has a weighted average score of 61 out of 100, based on 33 critics, indicating "generally favorable" reviews. Audiences polled by CinemaScore gave the film an average grade of "B−" on a scale of A+ to F.

In her review for The New York Times, Manohla Dargis wrote, "The Good Shepherd is an original story about the C.I.A., and for the filmmakers that story boils down to fathers who fail their sons, a suspect metaphor that here becomes all too ploddingly literal". She praised De Niro's direction: "Among the film's most striking visual tropes is the image of Wilson simply going to work in the capital alongside other similarly dressed men, a spectral army clutching briefcases and silently marching to uncertain victory".

Kenneth Turan, in his review for the Los Angeles Times, praised Matt Damon's performance. "Damon, in his second major role of the year (after The Departed) once again demonstrates his ability to convey emotional reserves, to animate a character from the inside out and create a man we can sense has more of an interior life than he is willing to let on."

Time magazine's Richard Corliss also gave Damon positive notice: "Damon is terrific in the role—all-knowing, never overtly expressing a feeling. Indeed, so is everyone else in this intricate, understated but ultimately devastating account of how secrets, when they are left to fester, can become an illness, dangerous to those who keep them, more so to nations that base their policies on them."

In his review for The New York Observer, Andrew Sarris wrote, "Still, no previous American film has ventured into this still largely unknown territory with such authority and emotional detachment. For this reason alone, The Good Shepherd is must-see viewing."

USA Today gave the film three stars out of four and wrote, "What makes the story work so powerfully is his focus on a multidimensional individual—Wilson—thereby creating a stirring personal tale about the inner workings of the clandestine government agency."

Entertainment Weekly gave the film a "B" rating, and Lisa Schwarzbaum praised De Niro's direction and Damon's performance by noting the latter's maturation as an actor.

Newsweek magazine's David Ansen wrote, "For the film's mesmerizing first 50 minutes I thought De Niro might pull off the Godfather of spy movies ... Still, even if the movie's vast reach exceeds its grasp, it's a spellbinding history lesson."

However, Peter Travers of Rolling Stone magazine observed, "It's tough to slog through a movie that has no pulse."

In his review for the Chicago Sun-Times, Jim Emerson wrote, "If you think George Tenet's Central Intelligence Agency was a disaster, wait until you see Robert De Niro's torpid, ineffectual movie about the history of the agency."

Peter Bradshaw in The Guardian gave the film two stars out of five and criticized Damon's performance: "And why is Damon allowed to act in such a callow, boring way? As ever, he looks like he is playing Robin to some imaginary Batman at his side, like Jimmy Stewart and his invisible rabbit. His nasal, unobtrusive voice makes every line sound the same."

In a retrospective review, cultural analyst Todd In The Shadows rated the film one out of five stars and wrote, "I truly believe, deep in my soul, that this is the most boring movie ever made."

=== Accolades ===
In 2007, the cast of The Good Shepherd won the Silver Bear for Outstanding Artistic Contribution at the Berlin International Film Festival. It was the only American entry in 2007 to win a prize at the festival.

It was also nominated at the 79th Academy Awards in the category of Best Art Direction (Jeannine Oppewall, Gretchen Rau and Leslie E. Rollins).

== Possible sequel ==
De Niro said that he would like to make two sequels to The Good Shepherd; one bringing the action forward from 1961 to 1989 and the fall of the Berlin Wall, and the other following its protagonist, Edward Wilson, to the present day.

In October 2020, De Niro said that he worked with Eric Roth on a sequel, but that it "never happened". However, "if someone gave me the money to make a sequel", he would.

In September 2012, it was announced that Showtime was developing the sequel as a television series, with Roth as executive producer and writer and De Niro directing the pilot. As of 2026, no further updates on the series were revealed.

== See also ==
- List of films featuring the deaf and hard of hearing

== Bibliography ==
- Galbraith, James K. (2000). "A Crime So Immense" (PDF). Texas Observer, (C) 2000 Texas Democracy Foundation. Archived from the original (PDF) on September 4, 2006.
