= Matthew Humphreys =

American actor

- Born: Matthew Humphreys; January 22, 1974 (age 52); Chapel Hill, North Carolina
- Other name: Matt Humphreys
- Education: BFA Emerson College, London Academy of Music and Dramatic Art
- Alma mater: MFA Yale School of Drama
- Occupation: Actor
- Years active: 2003 - Present
- Agent: Abrams Artists
- Spouse: Alexis Chiu (m. 2009)
- Children: 2

Matthew Humphreys (born January 22, 1974) is an American actor, producer, and co founder of the Bachelor of Fine Arts Acting for Film, Television, Voice-overs, & Commercials (FTVC) at Pace University. He is known for his work in Bar Karma, The Immigrant, and The Good Shepherd.

== Life and career ==
Humphreys wanted to be an actor from childhood. In his adolescence, he considered other careers, including being a stockbroker and a United States Navy SEAL, but pursued acting and toured with a regional theatre company in the Midwestern United States and throughout New York.

Humphreys returned to graduate school after his time with the theater company. He graduated with a MFA in Acting from the Yale School of Drama, after which he received more numerous and more recognizable acting roles both on stage and on the screen.

After spending years doing regional theater and work in New York City, he moved to Venice, Los Angeles in Southern California to live with his wife. In Los Angeles, Matthew became affiliated with Young Storytellers, a non-profit that mentors 5th graders in at-risk elementary schools, overseeing them writing their own short screenplay. He also volunteer taught acting at a teen center for homeless youth in L.A. called 'Hollywood Arts'.

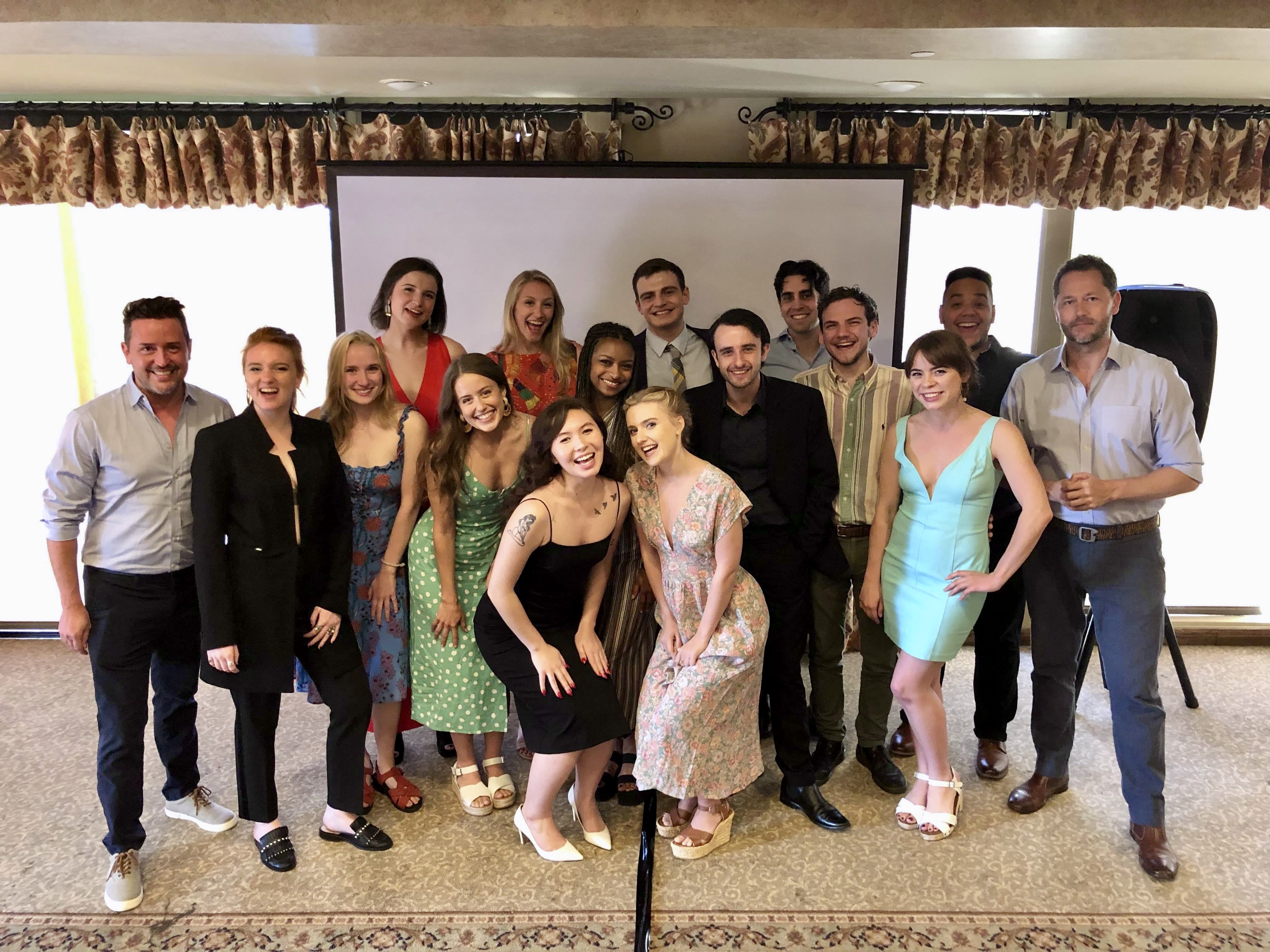
Humphreys (far right side) with the FTVC class of 2019

In a 2011 interview in regards to acting, he has stated that he usually can get a "feel for" what the producers and directors want for a character when he goes in for an audition, but he was given very little information as to the personality of his character in Bar Karma, the first online community-developed network television series conceptualized by Will Wright. Humphreys has said that he had to improvise and be creative during the audition process. Other than his role in Bar Karma, his favorite job to date was portraying the vampire Dixon in the CW series Supernatural. He enjoyed the good company on the set and was especially thrilled to work with the director Kim Manners, whom he called "absolutely unbelievable".

In 2013, Humphreys and Brian Hastert co founded the BFA in Acting for Film, Television, Voice Overs, and Commercials program (FTVC) at Pace University's School of Performing Arts. It has been acclaimed as the first undergraduate university program in the United States focused entirely on training the actor for work in front of the camera and microphone.

In May 2017, Humphreys became the head of the BFA program after Brian Hastert stepped down to make room for other 'projects'.

In June 2021, Humphreys announced the ending of his tenure with Pace University and intentions to move to Bristol, England for a new educational opportunity at the Bristol School of Acting.

Since October 2021, Humphreys has served as the Director of Acting Programmes with the goal to reimagine actor training at the school.

== Filmography ==
Year	Production	Role	Notes
2003	All My Children	Father Terry	1 episode
2006	We Fight to Be Free	Lieutenant James Monroe	Short
2006	Numb3rs	Randy Styles	1 episode
2006	The Good Shepherd	Cherry Orchard actor	
2007	Chapter 27	Frederic	
2007	Journeyman	Greg Weil	1 episode
2007	Supernatural	Dixon	1 episode
2008	Medium	Steven	1 episode
2008	Altamont Now	Alex Urban	
2008	Burn Notice	Philip	1 episode
2009	Obsessed	Patrick	
2009	The Forgotten	Ben Sheppard	1 episode
2010	Big Love	Ron Reed	2 episodes
2011	Bar Karma	Doug Jones	Main role (12 episodes)
2011	The Protector	Dr. Ben Ramsey	1 episode
2012	Elementary	Owen Barts	1 episode
2013	Blue Bloods	Arthur Phillips	1 episode
2013	The Immigrant	Cop #1	
2014	Alpha House	Col. Leland Grimmel	5 episodes
2015	Allegiance	Brad Davis	1 episode
2016	Chicago Med	Henry Joffe	1 episode
2016	Billions	Walter	2 episodes, 1 in 2018
2018	Bull	ADA Pappas	1 episode
2018	Half Life	Jeff	Main Role, Season 1
