= Belfast Wolves =

Belfast based franchise cricket team in European T20 Premier League (ETPL)

- Official logo of Belfast Wolves
- Nickname: The Wolves
- League: European T20 Premier League

Personnel
- Captain: Glenn Maxwell
- Coach: Kevin O'Brien
- Owner: Glenn Maxwell, Rohan Lund

Team information
- City: Belfast, Northern Ireland
- Colours: Sky Blue, Black, White
- Founded: January 21, 2026; 8 months ago

History
- ETPL wins: 0
- Official website: thebelfastwolves.com
T20 kit

The Belfast Wolves is a Irish professional Twenty20 franchise cricket team based in Belfast, Northern Ireland. They compete in the European T20 Premier League (ETPL).

The Wolves were announced as one of the league's three foundation franchises on 21 January 2026, representing Northern Ireland in the inaugural edition of the competition. The franchise is jointly owned by former Australian international Glenn Maxwell and businessman Rohan Lund. Maxwell also serves as the team's captain.

== History ==
=== Formation and ownership ===
The Belfast Wolves were established as one of the inaugural franchises of the European T20 Premier League (ETPL), a tournament originally conceived in 2019 by the cricket boards of Ireland, Scotland and the Netherlands, before being postponed because of the COVID-19 pandemic, and revived for a 2026 launch. Maxwell became one of the first active international cricketers to hold an ownership stake in an ETPL franchise while also captaining the side.

=== 2026: Inaugural season ===
The Wolves assembled a strong squad ahead of the inaugural 2026 season, appointing Australian all-rounder Glenn Maxwell as captain and signing Irish internationals Paul Stirling, Mark Adair, Lorcan Tucker, Tim Tector, and Matthew Humphreys. Dutch internationals Fred Klaassen and Alexander Roy were also brought in, alongside Scottish all-rounder Zainullah Ihsan. The squad was further strengthened by New Zealand all-rounder Mark Chapman, Italian all-rounder Harry Manenti, Italian bowler Crishan Kalugamage, American fast bowler Saurabh Netravalkar, and English fast bowler Chris Jordan. New Zealand wicketkeeper-batter Devon Conway and South African batter David Miller completed the squad.

Ahead of the inaugural season opener, the team announced it would be led by Australian Glenn Maxwell and coached by Kevin O'Brien.

Belfast began their inaugural campaign with a 52-run win over Dublin Guardians a no-result against Rotterdam Dockers due to rain in their second game In a rain-affected game, the Belfast secured a 9-wicket win over Amsterdam Flames in their third game a 59-runs defeat to Edinburgh Castle Rockers a 26-run win over Glasgow Cosmic

The ETPL is heading to Malahide Cricket Ground in Malahide, Ireland and the second half is ready to begin. a 8-wicket defeat to Dublin Guardians a 5-wicket win over Amsterdam Flames a 7-wicket defeat to Rotterdam Dockers a 103-run win over Glasgow Cosmic Belfast completed their league campaign with a 9-run DLS victory over Edinburgh Castle Rockers. After shooting up to a 2nd-place group stage finish heading into the playoffs, in the Qualifier a 7-wicket victory over Amsterdam Flames.

== Players ==
=== Squad ===
The Wolves assembled an experienced squad ahead of the inaugural ETPL season, appointing Glenn Maxwell as captain while retaining his dual role as player-owner. The franchise secured several established international cricketers, including Rassie van der Dussen, Mark Chapman, Chris Woakes, Chris Green, Sam Harper and Ashton Agar, forming the core of the team's overseas contingent.

=== Draft acquisitions ===
The ETPL Player Draft took place on 2 July 2026, with all six franchises selecting local players from associate nations through a snake-draft format. Each franchise was required to select a minimum of six and a maximum of eight players from the draft pool, with salaries ranging from $20,000 to $55,000 depending on draft position.

Irish internationals Paul Stirling, Matthew Humphreys, Tim Tector, alongside Dutch internationals Fred Klaassen and Alexander Roy also Scottish bowler Zainullah Ihsan.

== Current squad ==
- Players with international caps are listed in **bold**.

Team roster
No.	Name	Nat.	Batting style	Bowling style	Year signed	Notes
Batters
	**Tim Tector**	Ireland	Right-handed		2026	
	**David Miller**	South Africa	Left-handed		2026	
All-rounders
	**Glenn Maxwell** (c)	Australia	Right-handed	Right-arm off break	2026	Captain
	**Paul Stirling**	Ireland	Left-handed	Right-arm off break	2026	
	**Mark Adair**	Ireland	Right-handed	Right-arm fast-medium	2026	
	**Harry Manenti**	Italy	Right-handed	Right-arm off break	2026	
	**Alexander Roy**	Netherlands	Right-handed		2026	
	**Mark Chapman**	New Zealand	Left-handed	Slow left-arm orthodox	2026	
Wicket-keepers
	**Lorcan Tucker** (wk)	Ireland	Left-handed		2026	
	**Devon Conway** (wk)	New Zealand	Left-handed		2026	
Bowlers
	**Gavin Hoey**	Ireland	Right-handed	Leg break	2026	
	**Fred Klaassen**	Netherlands	Left-handed	Left-arm medium-fast	2026	
	**Matthew Humphreys**	Ireland	Left-handed	Slow left-arm orthodox	2026	
	**Crishan Kalugamage**	Italy	Right-handed	Right-arm medium-fast	2026	
	**Saurabh Netravalkar**	United States	Left-handed	Left-arm medium-fast	2026	
	**Chris Jordan**	England	Right-handed	Right-arm fast	2026	
	**Zainullah Ihsan**	Scotland	Right-handed	Right-arm medium	2026	

== Administration and support staff ==
Position	Name
Owner & captain	Glenn Maxwell
Co-owner	Rohan Lund
Head coach	TBA

== Seasons ==
=== Summaries ===
Season	W–L	Pos.	Finals	Coach	Captain	Most runs	Most Wickets	Refs
2026	6–3	3rd	RU	Kevin O'Brien	Glen Maxwell	Mark Chapman (283)	Matthew Humphreys (15)	

=== Tournament finishes ===
Year	League standing	Final standing
2026	3rd out of 6	Runners-up

- C: Champions
- RU: Runner-up
- SF: Team qualified for the semi-final stage of the competition

=== Statistics ===
Year	Played	Wins	Losses	Tied/NR (Note: NR indicates "no result"; abandoned matches are indicated as no result.)
2026	12	7	4	1
