= Gretchen Rau =

American property master, set decorator and art director (1939–2006)

Gretchen Rau (July 6, 1939 – March 29, 2006) was a professional property master, set decorator, and art director in the American film industry. Her more notable projects include the films Crocodile Dundee, A River Runs Through It, The Crucible, and The Life Aquatic with Steve Zissou.

Additionally, she won an Academy Award for set decoration for Memoirs of a Geisha, and was nominated for The Last Samurai and posthumously for The Good Shepherd.

Born in New Orleans, she lived most of her life in Northport, Long Island, New York until her death in 2006 from brain cancer, aged 66.
