= Jeannine Oppewall =

American film art director (born 1946)

- Born: Jeannine Claudia Oppewall; November 28, 1946 (age 79); Uxbridge, Massachusetts
- Occupation: Film art director
- Years active: 1973–present
- Spouse: Paul Schrader (m. 1969; div. 1976)

Jeannine Claudia Oppewall (born November 28, 1946) is an American film art director. She has worked on more than 30 movies in such roles as production designer, set decorator and set designer, and has four Academy Award nominations for Best Art Direction for L.A. Confidential, Pleasantville, Seabiscuit and The Good Shepherd. Many of her film sets represented different time periods within the 20th century, including the 1930s (Seabiscuit), the 1950s (L.A. Confidential and Pleasantville), and from the 1960s (The Big Easy, The Bridges of Madison County and Catch Me If You Can).

== Biography ==
=== Early life ===
Jeannine Oppewall was born on November 28, 1946, and was raised in Uxbridge, Massachusetts, with a Calvinist upbringing. Her father was a tool and die maker Garrett Oppewall and her mother was Eva Boutiler. According to The New York Times, Oppewall was determined to be "the family intellectual." Oppewall attended and graduated from Calvin College in Grand Rapids, Michigan, where she met future husband, Paul Schrader, who would go on to become a film director and screenwriter.

She then studied medieval history at Bryn Mawr College in Lower Merion Township, Pennsylvania. There she discovered the furniture of designers and filmmakers Charles and Ray Eames, which inspired her to switch her focus to modern design. Oppewall said of the Eames designs, "I was so attracted by the contemporary feeling, the shapely sexy lines: totally different from the Sears, Roebuck middle-class stuff I'd grown up with. I looked at it and said, 'This is me.'"

Oppewall obtained her master's degree from Bryn Mawr in 1969 and moved to Los Angeles, California. At age 22, she was given a job answering phones at the Venice studio of Charles Eames. According to some sources, Paul Schrader arranged an interview between Oppewall and Eames when he was writing a magazine article about the Eameses. Oppewall, however, has claimed she got the job while visiting the Charles Eames office as a guest and, upon leaving, casually asked a secretary whether there were any jobs available. Upon taking the job, Charles Eames told Oppewall, "I can teach you how to draw, I cannot teach you how to think or see. If you can think and you can see, you can stay." Oppewall worked with him for eight years, during which time Eames, in Oppewall's words, "saw something in me I didn't know was there." By the end of her time with Eames, she was helping design and organize Eames museum exhibits. Eames made more than 100 small personal and educational films in that time and, as a result of her exposure to them, Oppewall said she got into the film business "by accident."

=== Film career ===
Oppewall began her film career helping Paul Schrader on his 1979 film Hardcore, for which she was credited as a "project consultant." Oppewall and Schrader were divorced sometime after the film's release. She began her career as a set and production designer in the early 1980s, with such films as the 1981 Brian De Palma thriller Blow Out. Oppewall was responsible for overseeing the finding of locations for her films and the design and construction of sets and interiors; according to a profile in The New York Times, she was "responsible for everything an actor walks in front of, sits on, drives through or picks up."

One of her earlier movies was Tender Mercies, a 1983 film about an alcoholic country singer played by Robert Duvall. Director Bruce Beresford praised Oppewall as "absolutely brilliant," especially for her attention to very small details, "going from the curtains to the color of the quilts on the floors." A large portion of the movie was filmed in the home of Duvall's character, which Beresford created from an old house that had been sitting abandoned by a highway in Waxahachie, Texas, where the majority of the movie was filmed.

Oppewall said of her career, "What I do for a living is not dissimilar from what an actor does. I have a different set of tools, but it's the same process. The reason that it's fun to design sets is that it allows you to try on personalities that you'd never otherwise experience." Gary Ross, director of Pleasantville and Seabiscuit, said of Oppewall, "Jeannine doesn't suffer fools gladly, and she hasn't suffered me gladly when I've been a fool. She's fastidious, restrained and refined, and yet she has this impulsive side where she just takes off and chases butterflies." Gary Hoblit, who directed the 1996 Oppewall-designed film Primal Fear, said he particularly appreciated her flexibility and versatility: "While she may prefer a world in which less is more, she can still create an opulent and gooey world that is appropriate for someone unlike her."

Part of the set for Seabiscuit was set in Tijuana during the Prohibition era, Oppewall and her staff consulting vintage postcards in order to create the set; she said this part of the film was especially difficult to research because, "A Tijuana Historical Society didn't exactly exist back then." She also built a replica of the ranch owned by Charles S. Howard, the owner of the racehorse Seabiscuit, out of fir planks. Actor Jeff Bridges, who played Howard, was so impressed with the set that he made an unsuccessful attempt to buy it and have it shipped to his property in Montana, despite Oppewall's assurances that it was just a set and was not built to last. In a similar episode, the owners of the Santa Anita racetrack were so impressed with her design for a tote board that they wanted to keep it.

When Oppewall was assigned art director for the 2006 spy film The Good Shepherd, it took her a week to organize the number of set locations due to the large amounts of settings in the script, which included Cuba, Guatemala, Léopoldville, London, Moscow, New York and New Haven, Connecticut, among other places. Although the vast majority of the movie was filmed in New York, the only scenes that are actually set in New York take place in a house in Far Rockaway, Queens. As a result, many sets had to be constructed under Oppewall's direction, including a Skull and Bones headquarters and the Berlin set, which was built on the Brooklyn Navy Yard. Oppewall built sets based on Skull and Bones, Central Intelligence Agency and other clandestine organizations after she consulted with a former CIA operative and researched books of interviews with spy agency insiders. Since the lead character played by Matt Damon originally aspired to be a poet, Oppewall incorporated many visual poetic symbols into the film, including a large number of mirrors to represent the duplicity of the CIA, full-rigged ships as symbols of the state and eagle symbols, which were used in ironic situations such as suspect interrogations.

As of 2000 she is a member of the Board of Governors of the Academy of Motion Picture Arts and Sciences. She is also a world-traveled amateur lepidopterist. As of 2009, she also serves on the Art Directors Guild's education and workplace issues committees. In 2000, Oppewall tore down the bungalow and built a larger modern house in the style of Charles and Ray Eames because she "did not want my house to conflict with my (Eames-designed) furniture," which she bought while working for the Eameses.

== Awards and nominations ==
Oppewall has been nominated for four Academy Awards for Best Art Direction for L.A. Confidential in 1997, Pleasantville in 1998, Seabiscuit in 2003 and The Good Shepherd in 2006.

She was part of the team that won an Art Directors Guild Excellence in Production Design Award for the 2002 film Catch Me If You Can; Oppewall also received nominations for the same award for the films L.A. Confidential, Pleasantville, Wonder Boys, Seabiscuit and The Good Shepherd.
