= Sound Effects Choir =

The Hollywood Film Chorale Sound Effects Choir, also popularly known as the Honda Choir, is an ensemble that can physically produce human sound effects without electronic means. They are well known for two performances in an advertisement for Honda, and at the Academy Awards. It is conducted by Steve Sidwell, who is also the composer of their repertoire. The advert for Honda followed the advert from April 2003, “Cog”, which showcased the Honda Accord.

== Production of Effects ==
Sound effects are produced primarily by means of using the mouth; the arms, fingers, and hands are also sometimes used. For example, the performers would tap their fingernails against their teeth, to simulate rain falling on a car's windshield. To simulate wind, one would quickly blow air. To imitate the sound of tires squealing, a soprano would make a high pitched screeching sound.

== Performances ==
The ensemble was featured in a television advertisement for a Honda Civic in January 2006, called Choir, which gained immense popularity. The advertisement was made by the company Wieden and Kennedy, and shown mainly at countries in Europe such as the United Kingdom. This performance consisted of sixty vocalists, and was filmed in a car park in the end of November 2005.

In February 2007, the Choir also appeared as performers in the 79th Academy Awards, producing sound effects to a collection of different film clips in a piece called Elements and Motion. A video of these movie clips was shown behind the forty person choir, as they performed in Kodak Theatre. Although much praise was given to this particular performance, it has received some criticism of not reaching the high expectations set in any Academy Award festival.

== Awards ==
The television advertisement for the Honda Civic, that the Sound Effects Choir was featured in, won the Gold Lion Award in the Cannes Lions International Advertising Festival in September 2006, generally regarded as the most prestigious international advertising festival. The advertisement was a contender for the Grand Prix during this event.

== See also ==
- Chorus effect
