= 2021 Men's T20 World Cup Europe qualifier =

Cricket tournament

The 2021 ICC Men's T20 World Cup Europe Qualifier was a cricket tournament that was played as part of qualification process for the 2022 ICC Men's T20 World Cup. The sub regional tournaments were scheduled to take place in June and July 2021 in Finland and Belgium, with the regional final taking place in October 2021 in Spain. In April 2018, the International Cricket Council (ICC) granted full international status to Twenty20 men's matches played between member sides from 1 January 2019 onwards. Therefore, all the matches in the Regional Qualifiers were played as Twenty20 Internationals (T20Is).

However, in May 2021, after several postponements due to the COVID-19 pandemic, the sub-regional qualifiers were cancelled. As a result of the sub-regional qualifiers being cancelled, Italy, Germany and Denmark qualified from Groups A, B and C respectively, based on their positions in the ICC Men's T20I Team Rankings as of 30 April 2020. Jersey won the Regional Final, with Germany finishing in second place on net run rate, with both teams advancing to the 2022 ICC Men's T20 World Cup Global Qualifier A or 2022 ICC Men's T20 World Cup Global Qualifier B.

== Background ==
The top team in each sub regional qualifier would have progressed to the Regional Final, with the top two teams from the final progressing to one of the two Global Qualifiers. Jersey, the highest ranked team as of 1 January 2020, progressed directly to the Regional Final. On 28 January 2020, the ICC confirmed the teams and locations of the participants in the Europe Qualifier, with Finland hosting its first ever ICC event.

Originally the qualifiers were scheduled to be played between May and November 2020, in Belgium, Finland and Spain. However, on 24 March 2020, the International Cricket Council (ICC) confirmed that all ICC qualifying events scheduled to take place before 30 June 2020 had been postponed due to the COVID-19 pandemic. The European groups were originally scheduled to take place at the La Manga Club in Spain in late August 2020, with the Regional Final also taking place at La Manga, possibly as late as November 2020. However, due to the impact of the pandemic, the qualifiers were planned to take place in 2021, with two events in Finland and one in Belgium.

== Teams ==
The teams were placed into the following groups:

Qualifier A	Qualifier B	Qualifier C
Bulgaria; Cyprus; France; Israel; Italy; Malta; Norway; Spain	Finland; Germany; Gibraltar; Greece; Guernsey; Hungary; Luxembourg; Sweden	Austria; Belgium; Czech Republic; Denmark; Isle of Man; Portugal; Romania; Serbia

== Qualifier A ==
2021 ICC Men's T20 World Cup Europe Qualifier A
- Dates: 8 – 13 July 2021
- Administrator: ICC Europe
- Cricket format: T20I
- Host: Finland
- Participants: 8

Qualifier A was originally scheduled to take place from 16 to 22 May 2020 at the La Manga Club in Spain. The event was rescheduled to take place at the end of August 2020, but was later postponed again. In December 2020, ICC announced that the 8 team tournament would have been played between 8 and 13 July 2021. Finland were named as the hosts of this tournament. The group stage would have seen Bulgaria, Cyprus, France and Israel in one group, with Italy, Malta, Norway and Spain in the other.

== Qualifier B ==
2021 ICC Men's T20 World Cup Europe Qualifier B
- Dates: 24 – 30 June 2021
- Administrator: ICC Europe
- Cricket format: T20I
- Host: Finland
- Participants: 8

Group B was originally scheduled to take place from 24 to 30 June 2020 at the Kerava National Cricket Ground in Kerava and Tikkurila Cricket Ground and in Vantaa in Finland. The event was rescheduled to take place at the end of August 2020, but was later postponed again. In December 2020, ICC announced that the 8 team tournament would have been played between 30 June and 5 July 2021, with Finland hosting the event.

== Qualifier C ==
2021 ICC Men's T20 World Cup Europe Qualifier C
- Dates: 5 – 10 July 2021
- Administrator: ICC Europe
- Cricket format: T20I
- Host: Belgium
- Participants: 8

Qualifier C was originally scheduled to take place from 10 to 16 June 2020 in Belgium at the Royal Brussels Cricket Club in Waterloo and the Belgian Oval in Ghent. The event was rescheduled to take place at the end of August 2020, but was later postponed again. The event was rescheduled to take place at the end of August 2020, but was later postponed again. In December 2020, ICC announced that the 8 team tournament would have been played between 5 and 10 July 2021. Belgium would have hosted the tournament. The group stage would have seen Czech Republic, Denmark, Isle of Man and Romania in one group, with Austria, Belgium, Portugal and Serbia in the other.

== Regional Final ==
2021 ICC Men's T20 World Cup Europe Qualifier Regional Final
- Dates: 15 – 21 October 2021
- Administrator: ICC Europe
- Cricket format: T20I
- Host: Spain
- Champions: Jersey
- Participants: 4
- Matches: 12
- Most runs: (Jersey) Jonty Jenner (175)
- Most wickets: (Jersey) Charles Perchard (10) (Jersey) Benjamin Ward (10)

In December 2020, the ICC announced that the four-team tournament would be played in Spain between 15 and 21 October 2021, with two teams moving on to the next round. The schedule was announced in early October.

At the halfway stage, Jersey were on top of the table after winning their opening three games. Jersey then won their next match to confirm their progression to the Global Qualifiers. Germany finished in second place, ahead of Italy on net run rate, to also advance to the Global Qualifiers.

=== Squads ===
Denmark	Germany	Italy	Jersey
Frederik Klokker (c, wk); Bilal Aftab; Saif Ahmad; Lucky Ali; Surya Anand; Absar Khan; Amjad Khan; Delawar Khan; Zameer Khan (wk); Bashir Shah; Musa Shaheen; Shangeev Thanikaithasan; Anique Uddin; Shakerullah Safi	Venkatraman Ganesan (c); Harmanjot Singh (vc); Ghulam Ahmadi; Elam Bharathi; Dylan Blignaut; Vijayshankar Chikkannaiah; Fayaz Khan; Talha Khan; Dieter Klein; ~~Craig Meschede~~; Faisal Mubashir; Sahir Naqash; Michael Richardson (wk); Abdul Shakoor; Ahmed Wardak; Muslim Yar	Gareth Berg (c); Jade Dernbach; Madupa Fernando; Jamie Grassi; Damith Kosala; Darren Low; Dinidu Marage; Gian-Piero Meade; Joy Perera; Amir Sharif; Baljit Singh; Jaspreet Singh; Manpreet Singh (wk); Nikolai Smith; Grant Stewart	Charles Perchard (c); Daniel Birrell; Dominic Blampied; Charlie Brennan; Harrison Carlyon; Jake Dunford (wk); Nicholas Ferraby; Jonty Jenner; Elliot Miles; Rhys Palmer; Julius Sumerauer; Asa Tribe; Zak Tribe; Benjamin Ward

On 20 September 2021, Italy named former England international bowler Jade Dernbach in their squad, as well as Australian-born Kent bowler Grant Stewart, both of whom qualify via their Italian mothers. Gareth Berg of Northamptonshire was named as captain and coach, with former England international Owais Shah as assistant coach. Germany were boosted by a return to the national squad for Leicestershire bowler Dieter Klein, and a return from retirement for former Somerset and Glamorgan all-rounder Craig Meschede. Fayaz Khan and Faisal Mubashir were added to the German squad as reserves in October 2021. A dispute between the Danish association and its players following a proposed change to the selected squad, resulted in a number of players making themselves unavailable for selection. The Danish squad included former England international bowler Amjad Khan.

=== Points table ===
Pos	Team	Pld	W	L	NR	Pts	NRR
1	Jersey	6	6	0	0	12	0.752
2	Germany	6	3	3	0	6	0.085
3	Italy	6	3	3	0	6	−0.339
4	Denmark	6	0	6	0	0	−0.503

Source: ESPN Cricinfo

advanced to the global qualifier

=== Fixtures ===
15 October 2021
10:15
Scorecard

Jersey; 137/7 (20 overs)	v	Germany; 133/5 (20 overs)
Harrison Carlyon 50 (44); Sahir Naqash 3/30 (4 overs)		Talha Khan 32 (28); Charles Perchard 2/32 (4 overs)

Jersey won by 4 runs
Desert Springs Cricket Ground, Almería
Umpires: Allan Haggo (Sco) and Heath Kearns (Jer)
Player of the match: Harrison Carlyon (Jer)

- Germany won the toss and elected to field.
- Faisal Mubashir (Ger), Asa Tribe and Zak Tribe (Jer) all made their T20I debuts.

15 October 2021
15:15
Scorecard

Denmark; 100/9 (20 overs)	v	Italy; 101/4 (17.5 overs)
Surya Anand 31 (24); Jaspreet Singh 2/10 (3 overs)		Gian-Piero Meade 28 (28); Delawar Khan 2/5 (3 overs)

Italy won by 6 wickets
Desert Springs Cricket Ground, Almería
Umpires: Nitin Bathi (Ned) and Heath Kearns (Jer)
Player of the match: Gian-Piero Meade (Ita)

- Denmark won the toss and elected to bat.
- Shakerullah Safi, Shangeev Thanikaithasan (Den), Gareth Berg, Madupa Fernando, Jamie Grassi, Damith Kosala, Nikolai Smith and Grant Stewart (Ita) all made their T20I debuts.
- Amjad Khan also made his T20I debut for Denmark and Jade Dernbach made his T20I debut for Italy, after they previously played 1 and 34 T20Is, respectively, for England. They became the eleventh and twelfth cricketers to represent two international teams in T20Is.

16 October 2021
10:15
Scorecard

Denmark; 110/6 (20 overs)	v	Germany; 112/4 (18.2 overs)
Frederik Klokker 29* (28); Elam Bharathi 2/15 (4 overs)		Faisal Mubashir 36 (37); Saif Ahmad 1/13 (4 overs)

Germany won by 6 wickets
Desert Springs Cricket Ground, Almería
Umpires: Nitin Bathi (Ned) and Allan Haggo (Sco)
Player of the match: Faisal Mubashir (Ger)

- Denmark won the toss and elected to bat.
- Fayaz Khan (Ger) made his T20I debut.

16 October 2021
15:15
Scorecard

Jersey; 139/5 (20 overs)	v	Italy; 98 (18.2 overs)
Benjamin Ward 33* (18); Jaspreet Singh 2/17 (3 overs)		Jamie Grassi 20 (22); Charles Perchard 2/16 (3.2 overs)

Jersey won by 41 runs
Desert Springs Cricket Ground, Almería
Umpires: Allan Haggo (Sco) and Heath Kearns (Jer)
Player of the match: Benjamin Ward (Jer)

- Jersey won the toss and elected to bat.

17 October 2021
10:15
Scorecard

Jersey; 94 (19.3 overs)	v	Denmark; 89 (19.5 overs)
Benjamin Ward 32 (39); Bashir Shah 3/6 (4 overs)		Delawar Khan 24 (31); Charles Perchard 4/14 (3.5 overs)

Jersey won by 5 runs
Desert Springs Cricket Ground, Almería
Umpires: Nitin Bathi (Ned) and Allan Haggo (Sco)
Player of the match: Charles Perchard (Jer)

- Denmark won the toss and elected to field.
- Daniel Birrell (Jer) made his T20I debut.

17 October 2021
15:15
Scorecard

Italy; 103/5 (20 overs)	v	Germany; 104/6 (18.4 overs)
Grant Stewart 27 (25); Muslim Yar 3/18 (4 overs)		Dylan Blignaut 36* (48); Madupa Fernando 2/20 (4 overs)

Germany won by 4 wickets
Desert Springs Cricket Ground, Almería
Umpires: Nitin Bathi (Ned) and Heath Kearns (Jer)
Player of the match: Dylan Blignaut (Ger)

- Italy won the toss and elected to bat.
- Amir Sharif (Ita) made his T20I debut.

19 October 2021
10:15
Scorecard

Italy; 141/4 (20 overs)	v	Denmark; 132/9 (20 overs)
Grant Stewart 51 (31); Saif Ahmad 2/21 (4 overs)		Surya Anand 36 (26); Gian-Piero Meade 3/18 (4 overs)

Italy won by 9 runs
Desert Springs Cricket Ground, Almería
Umpires: Allan Haggo (Sco) and Heath Kearns (Jer)
Player of the match: Grant Stewart (Ita)

- Denmark won the toss and elected to field.
- Bilal Aftab (Den) made his T20I debut.

19 October 2021
15:15
Scorecard

Germany; 85 (19.5 overs)	v	Jersey; 86/6 (17.1 overs)
Dylan Blignaut 27 (27); Benjamin Ward 4/18 (4 overs)		Zak Tribe 25 (23); Sahir Naqash 2/9 (2 overs)

Jersey won by 4 wickets
Desert Springs Cricket Ground, Almería
Umpires: Nitin Bathi (Ned) and Heath Kearns (Jer)
Player of the match: Benjamin Ward (Jer)

- Germany won the toss and elected to bat.
- Charlie Brennan (Jer) made his T20I debut.

20 October 2021
10:15
Scorecard

Italy; 100/8 (20 overs)	v	Jersey; 104/2 (18.2 overs)
Joy Perera 23 (25); Daniel Birrell 2/15 (4 overs)		Jake Dunford 45* (53); Madupa Fernando 1/18 (4 overs)

Jersey won by 8 wickets
Desert Springs Cricket Ground, Almería
Umpires: Nitin Bathi (Ned) and Allan Haggo (Sco)
Player of the match: Harrison Carlyon (Jer)

- Jersey won the toss and elected to field.

20 October 2021
15:15
Scorecard

Germany; 119/5 (20 overs)	v	Denmark; 107 (19.4 overs)
Michael Richardson 61* (53); Saif Ahmad 3/12 (4 overs)		Shangeev Thanikaithasan 35 (32); Muslim Yar 3/25 (4 overs)

Germany won by 12 runs
Desert Springs Cricket Ground, Almería
Umpires: Allan Haggo (Sco) and Heath Kearns (Jer)
Player of the match: Michael Richardson (Ger)

- Denmark won the toss and elected to field.
- Absar Khan (Den) made his T20I debut.

21 October 2021
10:15
Scorecard

Italy; 117 (20 overs)	v	Germany; 116/6 (20 overs)
Joy Perera 45 (53); Dylan Blignaut 4/18 (2 overs)		Dieter Klein 28* (18); Madupa Fernando 2/15 (4 overs)

Italy won by 1 run
Desert Springs Cricket Ground, Almería
Umpires: Nitin Bathi (Ned) and Allan Haggo (Sco)
Player of the match: Dieter Klein (Ger)

- Germany won the toss and elected to field.
- Dylan Blignaut became the first bowler for Germany to take a hat-trick in T20Is.

21 October 2021
15:15
Scorecard

Denmark; 130/6 (20 overs)	v	Jersey; 131/6 (18.5 overs)
Delawar Khan 40* (27); Harrison Carlyon 2/22 (3 overs)		Jonty Jenner 96* (66); Bashir Shah 2/16 (3 overs)

Jersey won by 4 wickets
Desert Springs Cricket Ground, Almería
Umpires: Nitin Bathi (Ned) and Heath Kearns (Jer)
Player of the match: Jonty Jenner (Jer)

- Denmark won the toss and elected to bat.
