= German cricket team in Spain in 2021 =

International cricket tour

	Spain	Germany
- Dates: 10 – 11 September 2021
Captains	Christian Munoz-Mills	Venkatraman Ganesan

Twenty20 International series
- Results: Spain won the 3-match series 2–1
Most runs	Hamza Dar (120)	Dylan Blignaut (82)
Most wickets	Raja Adeel (6)	Elam Bharathi (6)

The Germany cricket team toured Spain in September 2021 to play a three-match Twenty20 International (T20I) series at the Desert Springs Cricket Ground in Almería. The two sides last met at the same venue in March 2020, when a two-match series was shared 1–1. Germany used the series to help with their preparations for the T20 World Cup Europe Qualifier that was played in Spain in October 2021. Germany won the first T20I match, with Spain then winning the remaining matches to win the series 2–1.

== Squads ==
Spain	Germany
Christian Munoz-Mills (c); Raja Adeel; Awais Ahmed (wk); Yasir Ali; Muhammad Asjed; Hamza Dar; Zulqarnain Haider; Paul Hennessy; Kuldeep Lal; Atif Mehmood; Ravi Panchal; Jack Perman; Charlie Rumistrzewicz; Tom Vine	Venkatraman Ganesan (c); Ghulam Ahmadi; Elam Bharathi; Dylan Blignaut; Vijayshankar Chikkannaiah; Talha Khan; Asad Mohammad; Nooruddin Mujadady; Sahir Naqash; Nilay Patel; Amith Sarma; Abdul Shakoor; Harmanjot Singh; Harish Srinivasan (wk); Ahmed Wardak

== T20I series ==
=== 1st T20I ===
10 September 2021
11:00
Scorecard

Spain; 128/7 (20 overs)	v	Germany; 132/3 (18.1 overs)
Hamza Dar 39 (33); Ghulam Ahmadi 2/10 (4 overs)		Talha Khan 51* (44); Raja Adeel 2/20 (4 overs)

Germany won by 7 wickets
Desert Springs Cricket Ground, Almería
Umpires: Darrin Clark (Esp) and Adnan Khan (Esp)

- Germany won the toss and elected to field.

=== 2nd T20I ===
11 September 2021
10:00
Scorecard

Germany; 115/9 (20 overs)	v	Spain; 116/5 (18.1 overs)
Venkatraman Ganesan 30 (28); Charlie Rumistrzewicz 2/8 (4 overs)		Awais Ahmed 47 (29); Elam Bharathi 2/19 (4 overs)

Spain won by 5 wickets
Desert Springs Cricket Ground, Almería
Umpires: Gordon Ashford (Esp) and Adnan Khan (Esp)
Player of the match: Charlie Rumistrzewicz (Esp)

- Germany won the toss and elected to bat.
- Charlie Rumistrzewicz (Esp) made his T20I debut.

=== 3rd T20I ===
11 September 2021
14:00
Scorecard

Germany; 119/9 (20 overs)	v	Spain; 120/9 (19.4 overs)
Abdul Shakoor 31 (28); Charlie Rumistrzewicz 3/15 (4 overs)		Hamza Dar 59* (50); Dylan Blignaut 2/18 (3.4 overs)

Spain won by 1 wicket
Desert Springs Cricket Ground, Almería
Umpires: Gordon Ashford (Esp) and Darrin Clark (Esp)
Player of the match: Hamza Dar (Esp)

- Spain won the toss and elected to field.
