= German cricket team in Spain in 2019–20 =

International cricket tour

| | Spain | Germany |
- Date: 8 March 2020
| Captains | Christian Munoz-Mills | Venkatraman Ganesan |

Twenty20 International series
- Results: 2-match series drawn 1–1
| Most runs | Yasir Ali (129) | Michael Richardson (67) |
| Most wickets | Kuldeep Lal (2); Raja Adeel (2) | Elam Bharathi (3) |

The Germany cricket team toured Spain in March 2020 to play two Twenty20 International (T20I) matches. Both matches were played on Sunday 8 March 2020 at the Desert Springs Cricket Ground in southern Spain. The first T20I, played in the morning, became the first international cricket match on the venue. The series was drawn 1–1.

== Squads ==
| Spain | Germany |
|---|---|
| Christian Munoz-Mills (c); Raja Adeel; ~~Faran Afzal~~; Awais Ahmed (wk); Adam Algar (wk); Yasir Ali; Paul Hennessy; Tauqeer Hussain; Kuldeep Lal; Ravi Panchal; Jack Perman; Mukhtiar Singh; Tom Vine | Venkatraman Ganesan (c); Elam Bharathi; Vijayshankar Chikkannaiah; Izatullah Dawlatzai; Dieter Klein; Amir Mangal; Asad Mohammad; Sahir Naqash; Michael Richardson (wk); Amith Sarma; Abdul Shakoor; Harmanjot Singh; Ahmed Wardak; Muslim Yar |

Faran Afzal withdrew from the Spain squad before the start of the series.

== T20I series ==
=== 1st T20I ===
8 March 2020
10:00
Scorecard

| Germany; 139/7 (20 overs) | v | Spain; 142/1 (18.1 overs) |
| Michael Richardson 42 (45); Raja Adeel 2/18 (4 overs) | | Yasir Ali 80* (66); Dieter Klein 1/29 (4 overs) |

Spain won by 9 wickets
Desert Springs Cricket Ground, Almería
Umpires: Harmit Dhull (Esp) and Adnan Khan (Esp)
Player of the match: Yasir Ali (Esp)

- Spain won the toss and elected to field.
- Adam Algar (Esp), Elam Bharathi and Dieter Klein (Ger) all made their T20I debuts.
- Dieter Klein took a wicket with his first delivery in T20Is.

=== 2nd T20I ===
8 March 2020
14:00
Scorecard

| Germany; 180/3 (20 overs) | v | Spain; 122/6 (20 overs) |
| Abdul Shakoor 59 (46); Kuldeep Lal 1/19 (2 overs) | | Yasir Ali 49 (31); Elam Bharathi 3/21 (4 overs) |

Germany won by 58 runs
Desert Springs Cricket Ground, Almería
Umpires: Harmit Dhull (Esp) and Adnan Khan (Esp)
Player of the match: Elam Bharathi (Ger)

- Spain won the toss and elected to field.
