= 2023 Men's T20 World Cup Europe regional final =

Cricket qualification tournament

2023 ICC Men's T20 World Cup Europe regional final
- Dates: 20 – 28 July 2023
- Administrator(s): International Cricket Council; ICC Europe
- Cricket format: Twenty20 International
- Tournament format: Round-robin
- Host: Scotland
- Champions: Scotland
- Runners-up: Ireland
- Participants: 7
- Matches: 21
- Player of the series: (Scotland) Richie Berrington
- Most runs: (Scotland) Ollie Hairs (Scotland) Richie Berrington (248 each)
- Most wickets: (Scotland) Brad Currie (Ireland) Mark Adair (12 each)

The 2024 ICC Men's T20 World Cup was the ninth edition of the ICC Men's T20 World Cup, a biennial world cup for cricket in Twenty20 International (T20I) format, organized by the International Cricket Council (ICC). The qualification process for the World Cup included two stages: direct qualification and regional qualification. The regional qualification for Europe was held in two stages: sub-regional qualifiers and regional final.

The EAP regional final was hosted by Cricket Scotland from 20 to 28 July 2023. Scotland and Ireland qualified for the T20 World Cup after finishing atop the points table. Scotland's Richie Berrington was named player of the series having along with Ollie Hairs scored the most runs (248 each) while Brad Currie and Ireland's Mark Adair took the most wickets (12 each) in the tournament.

== Teams and qualification ==
A total of 28 teams participated in the sub-regional phase, which was divided into three events. The winners of each sub-regional qualifier advanced to the regional final, where they joined Ireland and Scotland who received a bye due to their participation in the 2022 T20 World Cup and Germany and Jersey who received a bye after taking part in the 2022 global qualifiers.

Method of qualification	Date	Venue(s)	No. of teams	Team
2022 Men's T20 World Cup	13 November 2022	Australia	2	Ireland
2022 Men's T20 World Cup	13 November 2022	Australia	2	Scotland
2022 global qualifier A	24 February 2022	Oman	1	Germany
2022 global qualifier B	17 July 2022	Zimbabwe	1	Jersey
Sub-regional qualifier A	12 – 19 July 2022	Finland	1	Italy
Sub-regional qualifier B	24 – 31 July 2022	Finland	1	Austria
Sub-regional qualifier C	28 June – 4 July 2022	Scotland	1	Denmark
Total			7	

== Squads ==
- Sources: ESPNcricinfo, International Cricket Council

Austria	Denmark	Germany	Ireland
Razmal Shigiwal (c); Mirza Ahsan; Abdullah Akbarjan; Mehar Cheema (wk); Iqbal Hossain; Aqib Iqbal; Shahil Momin; Amit Nathwani; Armaan Randhawa; Jaweed Sadran; Adeel Tariq; Umair Tariq; Mark Simpson-Parker (wk); Navin Wijesekera; Sahel Zadran	Hamid Shah (c); Taranjit Bharaj (vc, wk); Saif Ahmad; Lucky Ali; Surya Anand; Saran Aslam; Oliver Hald; Abdul Hashmi (wk); Jonas Henriksen; Eshan Karimi; Nicolaj Laegsgaard; Abdullah Mahmood; Saud Munir; Musa Shaheen; Shangeev Thanikaithasan	Venkatraman Ganesan (c); Ghulam Ahmadi; Elam Bharathi; Dylan Blignaut; Vijayshankar Chikkannaiah; Talha Khan; Dieter Klein; Sachin Mandy (wk); Matt Montgomery; Faisal Mubashir; Sahir Naqash; Michael Richardson (wk); Abdul Shakoor; Harmanjot Singh; Joshua van Heerden; Muslim Yar; Zahid Zadran	Paul Stirling (c); Mark Adair; Ross Adair; Andrew Balbirnie; Curtis Campher; ~~Gareth Delany~~; George Dockrell; Graham Hume; Josh Little; Barry McCarthy; Neil Rock (wk); Harry Tector; Lorcan Tucker (wk); Theo van Woerkom; Ben White; Craig Young
Italy	Jersey	Scotland	
Gareth Berg (c); Marcus Campopiano; Stefano di Bartolomeo; Crishan Kalugamage; Wayne Madsen; Ben Manenti; Harry Manenti; Gian-Piero Meade (wk); Anthony Mosca; Justin Mosca; Syed Naqvi; Manpreet Singh (wk); Jaspreet Singh; Sukhwinder Singh; Grant Stewart	Charles Perchard (c); Dominic Blampied; Charlie Brennan; Toby Britton; Harrison Carlyon; Patrick Gouge; Nick Greenwood; Jonty Jenner; Josh Lawrenson; Elliot Miles; Rhys Palmer; William Perchard; Julius Sumerauer; Asa Tribe (wk); Zak Tribe; Benjamin Ward	Richie Berrington (c); Matthew Cross (wk); Brad Currie; Chris Greaves; Ollie Hairs; Jack Jarvis; Michael Leask; Tomas Mackintosh (wk); Gavin Main; Brandon McMullen; George Munsey; Adrian Neill; Safyaan Sharif; ~~Chris Sole~~; Hamza Tahir; Mark Watt	

Gareth Delany was ruled out of Ireland's squad due to a broken wrist, and he was replaced by Theo van Woerkom. Chris Sole was ruled out of Scotland's squad due to injury, and he was replaced by Adrian Neill. Denmark's captain Hamid Shah missed the team's first four matches, and Taranjit Bharaj took over as captain while Shah was absent; Shah returned for the remaining games. After the tournament began, Vijayshankar Chikkannaiah was replaced in Germany's squad by Talha Khan due to injury. Ahead of Germany's last two matches of the tournament, Abdul Shakoor was replaced by Matt Montgomery after sustaining an injury. Patrick Gouge was added to Jersey's squad ahead of their last game of the tournament, in place of Benjamin Ward, who was struck by a ball in the previous game.

== Points table ==
Pos	Team	Pld	W	L	NR	Pts	NRR	Qualification
1	Scotland	6	6	0	0	12	4.110	Qualified for the 2024 Men's T20 World Cup
2	Ireland	6	4	1	1	9	2.716	Qualified for the 2024 Men's T20 World Cup
3	Italy	6	3	2	1	7	−0.965	
4	Jersey	6	3	3	0	6	0.431	
5	Germany	6	2	3	1	5	−0.440	
6	Denmark	6	1	5	0	2	−0.894	
7	Austria	6	0	5	1	1	−5.885	

Source: ESPNcricinfo

== Fixtures ==
20 July 2023
10:30
Scorecard

Austria; 104/9 (20 overs)	v	Jersey; 106/2 (9.2 overs)
Razmal Shigiwal 17 (13); Nick Greenwood 2/10 (3 overs)		Nick Greenwood 50* (27); Abdullah Akbarjan 1/24 (2 overs)

Jersey won by 8 wickets
The Grange Club, Edinburgh
Umpires: Jesper Jensen (Den) and David McLean (Sco)
Player of the match: Nick Greenwood (Jer)

- Jersey won the toss and elected to field.

20 July 2023
10:30
Scorecard

Ireland; 158/8 (20 overs)	v	Italy; 151/9 (20 overs)
Curtis Campher 61 (39); Gareth Berg 3/24 (4 overs)		Gareth Berg 26 (17); Mark Adair 3/33 (4 overs)

Ireland won by 7 runs
Goldenacre Sports Ground, Edinburgh
Umpires: Allan Haggo (Sco) and Mark Jameson (Ger)
Player of the match: Curtis Campher (Ire)

- Italy won the toss and elected to field.
- Stefano di Bartolomeo, Ben Manenti and Syed Naqvi (Ita) all made their T20I debuts.

20 July 2023
15:30
Scorecard

Scotland; 234/5 (20 overs)	v	Germany; 65/7 (11 overs)
Ollie Hairs 73 (36); Sahir Naqash 2/44 (4 overs)		Joshua van Heerden 17 (18); Gavin Main 2/8 (2 overs)

Scotland won by 72 runs (DLS method)
Goldenacre Sports Ground, Edinburgh
Umpires: Nitin Bathi (Ned) and Mark Jameson (Ger)
Player of the match: Ollie Hairs (Sco)

- Germany won the toss and elected to field.
- Germany were set a revised target of 138 runs in 11 overs due to rain.
- Brad Currie and Brandon McMullen (Sco) both made their T20I debuts.

21 July 2023
10:30
Scorecard

Denmark; 122/9 (20 overs)	v	Ireland; 123/1 (14.3 overs)
Oliver Hald 21 (15); Barry McCarthy 3/16 (4 overs)		Paul Stirling 55* (39); Jonas Henriksen 1/28 (3 overs)

Ireland won by 9 wickets
The Grange Club, Edinburgh
Umpires: Roland Black (Ire) and David McLean (Sco)
Player of the match: Andrew Balbirnie (Ire)

- Denmark won the toss and elected to bat.
- Jonas Henriksen (Den) made his T20I debut.

21 July 2023
10:30
Scorecard

Austria; 83 (18.4 overs)	v	Germany; 86/1 (10.1 overs)
Mark Simpson-Parker 24 (29); Sahir Naqash 2/12 (3 overs)		Joshua van Heerden 47* (31); Sahel Zadran 1/34 (3.1 overs)

Germany won by 9 wickets
Goldenacre Sports Ground, Edinburgh
Umpires: Nitin Bathi (Ned) and Allan Haggo (Sco)
Player of the match: Joshua van Heerden (Ger)

- Austria won the toss and elected to bat.

21 July 2023
15:30
Scorecard

Scotland; 149/6 (20 overs)	v	Jersey; 135/9 (20 overs)
Richie Berrington 34 (29); Elliot Miles 2/25 (4 overs)		Benjamin Ward 47* (29); Mark Watt 4/21 (4 overs)

Scotland won by 14 runs
The Grange Club, Edinburgh
Umpires: Roland Black (Ire) and Jesper Jensen (Den)
Player of the match: Mark Watt (Sco)

- Jersey won the toss and elected to field.

23 July 2023
10:30
Scorecard

Ireland; 226/4 (20 overs)	v	Austria; 98 (18.4 overs)
Lorcan Tucker 94* (51); Aqib Iqbal 2/46 (4 overs)		Razmal Shigiwal 33 (32); Mark Adair 4/13 (3.4 overs)

Ireland won by 128 runs
The Grange Club, Edinburgh
Umpires: Mark Jameson (Ger) and David McLean (Sco)
Player of the match: Lorcan Tucker (Ire)

- Austria won the toss and elected to field.

23 July 2023
10:30
Scorecard

Italy; 183/8 (20 overs)	v	Jersey; 158 (20 overs)
Wayne Madsen 52 (30); Benjamin Ward 3/38 (4 overs)		Nick Greenwood 32 (24); Gareth Berg 3/26 (4 overs)

Italy won by 25 runs
Goldenacre Sports Ground, Edinburgh
Umpires: Allan Haggo (Sco) and Jesper Jensen (Den)
Player of the match: Wayne Madsen (Ita)

- Jersey won the toss and elected to field.
- Wayne Madsen (Ita) made his T20I debut.

23 July 2023
15:30
Scorecard

Denmark; 124/9 (20 overs)	v	Germany; 126/4 (16.5 overs)
Taranjit Bharaj 43 (37); Ghulam Ahmadi 2/18 (4 overs)		Joshua van Heerden 42 (33); Abdullah Mahmood 3/22 (4 overs)

Germany won by 6 wickets
The Grange Club, Edinburgh
Umpires: Roland Black (Ire) and David McLean (Sco)
Player of the match: Joshua van Heerden (Ger)

- Germany won the toss and elected to field.

24 July 2023
10:30
Scorecard

Scotland; 245/2 (20 overs)	v	Italy; 90 (12.4 overs)
Ollie Hairs 127* (53); Grant Stewart 1/22 (4 overs)		Grant Stewart 41 (21); Gavin Main 5/26 (3.4 overs)

Scotland won by 155 runs
The Grange Club, Edinburgh
Umpires: Roland Black (Ire) and Mark Jameson (Ger)
Player of the match: Ollie Hairs (Sco)

- Italy won the toss and elected to field.
- Ollie Hairs (Sco) scored his first century in T20Is.
- Gavin Main (Sco) took his first five-wicket haul in T20Is.

24 July 2023
10:30
Scorecard

Austria; 97/9 (20 overs)	v	Denmark; 98/2 (12.4 overs)
Armaan Randhawa 28 (45); Nicolaj Laegsgaard 4/19 (4 overs)		Saif Ahmad 53* (41); Amit Nathwani 1/19 (2 overs)

Denmark won by 8 wickets
Goldenacre Sports Ground, Edinburgh
Umpires: Nitin Bathi (Ned) and David McLean (Sco)
Player of the match: Nicolaj Laegsgaard (Den)

- Denmark won the toss and elected to field.

24 July 2023
15:30
Scorecard

Jersey; 78/9 (20 overs)	v	Ireland; 80/1 (10.2 overs)
Asa Tribe 26 (28); Barry McCarthy 3/7 (4 overs)		Paul Stirling 35* (26); Benjamin Ward 1/23 (3.2 overs)

Ireland won by 9 wickets
Goldenacre Sports Ground, Edinburgh
Umpires: Nitin Bathi (Ned) and Jesper Jensen (Den)
Player of the match: Barry McCarthy (Ire)

- Ireland won the toss and elected to field.

25 July 2023
10:30
Scorecard

Italy; 150/8 (20 overs)	v	Denmark; 124 (19.3 overs)
Harry Manenti 51 (35); Saif Ahmad 2/19 (3 overs)		Taranjit Bharaj 52 (43); Gareth Berg 4/14 (4 overs)

Italy won by 26 runs
The Grange Club, Edinburgh
Umpires: Nitin Bathi (Ned) and Roland Black (Ire)
Player of the match: Harry Manenti (Ita)

- Denmark won the toss and elected to field.
- Eshan Karimi (Den) made his T20I debut.

25 July 2023
10:30
Scorecard

Scotland; 232/2 (20 overs)	v	Austria; 66 (16.3 overs)
George Munsey 132 (61); Abdullah Akbarjan 2/22 (4 overs)		Jaweed Sadran 15 (14); Michael Leask 3/11 (4 overs)

Scotland won by 166 runs
Goldenacre Sports Ground, Edinburgh
Umpires: Allan Haggo (Sco) and Jesper Jensen (Den)
Player of the match: George Munsey (Sco)

- Austria won the toss and elected to field.
- Tomas Mackintosh (Sco) made his T20I debut.
- George Munsey achieved the highest individual score for Scotland in men's T20Is.

25 July 2023
15:30
Scorecard

Jersey; 190/5 (20 overs)	v	Germany; 139/8 (20 overs)
Nick Greenwood 86* (56); Sahir Naqash 3/37 (4 overs)		Faisal Mubashir 57* (50); Julius Sumerauer 4/22 (4 overs)

Jersey won by 51 runs
The Grange Club, Edinburgh
Umpires: Nitin Bathi (Ned) and David McLean (Sco)
Player of the match: Nick Greenwood (Jer)

- Germany won the toss and elected to field.

27 July 2023
10:30
Scorecard

Scotland; 159/7 (18 overs)	v	Denmark; 126/7 (18 overs)
Richie Berrington 60 (32); Nicolaj Laegsgaard 3/23 (4 overs)		Hamid Shah 56 (42); Brad Currie 3/18 (4 overs)

Scotland won by 33 runs
The Grange Club, Edinburgh
Umpires: Roland Black (Ire) and David McLean (Sco)
Player of the match: Richie Berrington (Sco)

- Denmark won the toss and elected to field.
- The match was reduced to 18 overs per side due to rain.

27 July 2023
10:30
Scorecard

Germany	v	Ireland

Match abandoned
Goldenacre Sports Ground, Edinburgh
Umpires: Allan Haggo (Sco) and Mark Jameson (Ger)

- No toss.
- No play was possible due to rain.

27 July 2023
15:30
Scorecard

Austria	v	Italy

Match abandoned
Goldenacre Sports Ground, Edinburgh
Umpires: Mark Jameson (Ger) and Jesper Jensen (Den)

- No toss.
- No play was possible due to rain.

28 July 2023
10:30
Scorecard

Germany; 141 (20 overs)	v	Italy; 147/6 (18.5 overs)
Joshua van Heerden 35 (21); Stefano di Bartolomeo 5/14 (4 overs)		Anthony Mosca 70* (51); Dieter Klein 2/18 (4 overs)

Italy won by 4 wickets
The Grange Club, Edinburgh
Umpires: Allan Haggo (Sco) and Mark Jameson (Ger)
Player of the match: Stefano di Bartolomeo (Ita)

- Italy won the toss and elected to field.
- Matt Montgomery (Ger) made his T20I debut.
- Stefano di Bartolomeo became the first player for Italy to take a five-wicket haul in men's T20Is.

28 July 2023
10:30
Scorecard

Jersey; 159 (20 overs)	v	Denmark; 131/7 (20 overs)
Nick Greenwood 43 (17); Nicolaj Laegsgaard 3/23 (3 overs)		Saif Ahmad 46 (36); Rhys Palmer 2/21 (4 overs)

Jersey won by 28 runs
Goldenacre Sports Ground, Edinburgh
Umpires: Nitin Bathi (Ned) and Jesper Jensen (Den)
Player of the match: Nick Greenwood (Jer)

- Denmark won the toss and elected to field.
- Patrick Gouge (Jer) made his T20I debut.
- Nicolaj Laegsgaard (Den) took his first hat-trick in T20Is.

28 July 2023
15:30
Scorecard

Scotland; 213/6 (20 overs)	v	Ireland; 205/9 (20 overs)
Brandon McMullen 68 (35); Barry McCarthy 2/42 (4 overs)		Mark Adair 72 (36); Brad Currie 5/13 (4 overs)

Scotland won by 8 runs
The Grange Club, Edinburgh
Umpires: Roland Black (Ire) and Allan Haggo (Sco)
Player of the match: Brad Currie (Sco)

- Ireland won the toss and elected to field.
- Brad Currie (Sco) took his first five-wicket haul in T20Is.
