= 2024 Men's T20 World Cup Europe Sub-regional Qualifier B =

Qualification tournament for the 2026 T20WC in Europe region

2024 ICC Men's T20 World Cup Europe Sub-regional Qualifier B
- Dates: 7 – 14 July 2024
- Administrator: ICC Europe
- Cricket format: Twenty20 International
- Tournament format(s): Group stage and Knockouts
- Host: Germany
- Champions: Jersey
- Runners-up: Norway
- Participants: 10
- Matches: 22
- Player of the series: (Jersey) Benjamin Ward
- Most runs: (Germany) Harmanjot Singh (154)
- Most wickets: (Jersey) Benjamin Ward (13)

The 2024 ICC Men's T20 World Cup Europe Sub-regional Qualifier B was a cricket tournament that formed part of the qualification process for the 2026 Men's T20 World Cup. It was hosted by Germany in July 2024.

The event was planned to be held at two venues like the other two sub-regional qualifiers but on the day before first matches ICC announced that the ground inside the GelsenTrabPark, Gelsenkirchen could not be approved for the event. The schedule was changed to hold all matches at Krefeld.

The winners of the tournament, Jersey advanced to the regional final, where they will be joined by Netherlands and Scotland who were given a bye after having participated in the previous T20 World Cup, and two other teams from sub-regional qualifiers A and C.

== Squads ==
Belgium	Croatia	Germany	Gibraltar	Jersey
Sheraz Sheikh (c); Khalid Ahmadi; Sajad Ahmadzai; Fahim Bhatti; Shaheryar Butt (wk); Dumon Dewald; Ali Raza (wk); Mansoor Malangzai; Aziz Mohammad; Muhammad Muneeb; Burhan Niaz; Waqas Raja; Adnan Razzaq; Saber Zakhil	Daniel Turkich (c); Anthony Govorko; Jeffrey Grzinic (wk); Michael Grzinic; Boro Jerkovic; Aman Maheshwari; Daniel Marsic; Luke Potthoff; Phillip Roberts; Jaikumar Thakur; Oliver Tilley; Christopher Turkich; John Vujnovich; Zach Vukusic	Venkatraman Ganesan (c); Ghulam Ahmadi; Mussadiq Ahmed; Vaseekaran Aritharan; Adil Khan; Fayaz Khan; Ben Kohler-Cadmore; Sajid Liaqat; Sachin Mandy (wk); Faisal Mubashir; Harmanjot Singh; Hamid Wardak; Muslim Yar; Zahid Zadran	Avinash Pai (c); Iain Latin (vc); Samarth Bodha; Louis Bruce; Kieron Ferrary (wk); James Fitzgerald; Mark Gouws; Jack Horrocks; Kabir Mirpuri; Kenroy Nestor; Chris Pyle (wk); Michael Raikes; Philip Raikes; Kayron Stagno (wk)	Charles Perchard (c); Daniel Birrell; Dominic Blampied; Charlie Brennan; Harrison Carlyon; Patrick Gouge (wk); Nick Greenwood; Jonty Jenner; Jake Dunford (wk); Scott Simpson; Julius Sumerauer; Asa Tribe; Zak Tribe; Benjamin Ward
Norway	Serbia	Slovenia	Sweden	Switzerland
Raza Iqbal (c); Kuruge Abeyrathna (wk); Khizer Ahmed (wk); Anil Parmar; Walid Ghauri; Javed Maroofkhail; Ibrahim Rahimi; Qamar Mushtaque; Vinay Ravi; Sher Sahak; Mofassar Saeed; Wahidullah Sahak; Ali Saleem; Ahmadullah Shinwari; Mandeep Singh	Mark Pavlovic (c); Wintley Burton (wk); Alexander Dizija; Leslie Dunbar (wk); Alister Gajic; Simo Ivetic; Peter Nedeljković; Braithyn Pecic; Matija Sarenac; Slobodan Tosic; Edward Van Reenen; Luka Woods; Nemanja Zimonjic; Vukasin Zimonjic	Izaz Ali (c); Taher Muhammad (vc); Saeed Waqar Ali; Shahid Arshad; Mazhar Khan (wk); Waqar Khan; Sudhakar Koppolu; Rasheed Ali Mamadkhel; Junaed Mullah (wk); Dileep Pallekonda; Tarun Sharma; Merwais Shinwari; Shoaib Siddiqui; Ramanjot Singh	Imal Zuwak (c); Saeed Ahmed; Choudry Share Ali; Abdul Naser Baluch; Hamid Mahmood; Sandeep Mallidi; Ajay Mundra; Sami Rahmani; Prashant Shukla; Jawid Stanigze; Abdur Rahman Sudais; Zaker Taqawi; Khalid Zahid; Zabiullah Zahid	Faheem Nazir (c); Bashir Ahmad; Noorkhan Ahmedi; Kenardo Fletcher; Ahmed Hassan (wk); Osama Mahmood; Anishkumar Nalinambika; Ali Nayyer; Abdullah Rana; Jai Sinh; Malyar Stanikzai; Idrees Ul Haque; Arjun Vinod; Ashwin Vinod

== Group stage ==
=== Group A ===
Group A standings
Pos	Team	Pld	W	L	NR	Pts	NRR	Qualification
1	Jersey	4	3	0	1	7	7.333	Advanced to the final
2	Croatia	4	2	1	1	5	−0.266	Advanced to the 3rd place play-off
3	Belgium	4	2	2	0	4	−0.363	Eliminated
4	Switzerland	4	2	2	0	4	−1.089	Eliminated
5	Serbia	4	0	4	0	0	−4.247	Eliminated

Source: ESPNcricinfo

7 July 2024
10:30
Scorecard

Jersey; 233/3 (20 overs)	v	Serbia; 68 (18.2 overs)
Harrison Carlyon 110 (57); Peter Nedeljkovic 1/33 (4 overs)		Luka Woods 21 (23); Nick Greenwood 3/8 (3.2 overs)

Jersey won by 165 runs
Bayer Uerdingen Cricket Ground, Krefeld
Umpires: Rizwan Akram (Ned) and Mark Jameson (Ger)
Player of the match: Harrison Carlyon (Jer)

- Jersey won the toss and elected to bat.
- Harrison Carlyon became the first player for Jersey to score a century in men's T20Is.

7 July 2024
15:30
Scorecard

Switzerland; 172/4 (20 overs)	v	Belgium; 177/8 (19.1 overs)
Idrees Ul Haque 55 (43); Dumon Dewald 2/22 (3 overs)		Burhan Niaz 72* (37); Faheem Nazir 3/32 (4 overs)

Belgium won by 2 wickets
Bayer Uerdingen Cricket Ground, Krefeld
Umpires: Nitin Bathi (Ned) and Mike Burns (Eng)
Player of the match: Burhan Niaz (Bel)

- Belgium won the toss and elected to field.
- Malyar Stanikzai (Sui) made his T20I debut.

8 July 2024
17:00
Scorecard

Croatia; 140/6 (20 overs)	v	Belgium; 100/6 (15.1 overs)
Zach Vukusic 53 (35); Khalid Ahmadi 2/27 (4 overs)		Muhammad Muneeb 54 (48); Michael Grzinic 2/11 (2 overs)

Croatia won by 6 runs (DLS method)
Bayer Uerdingen Cricket Ground, Krefeld
Umpires: Mark Jameson (Ger) and Jonathan Kennedy (Ire)
Player of the match: Zach Vukusic (Cro)

- Croatia won the toss and elected to bat.
- No further play was possible due to rain.
- Anthony Govorko, Michael Grzinic, Luke Potthoff, Phillip Roberts and Zach Vukusic (Cro) all made their T20I debuts.

9 July 2024
17:00
Scorecard

Jersey; 219/9 (20 overs)	v	Switzerland; 52 (12.1 overs)
Jonty Jenner 67 (30); Ali Nayyer 3/30 (4 overs)		Idrees Ul Haque 19 (23); Benjamin Ward 4/6 (3.1 overs)

Jersey won by 167 runs
Bayer Uerdingen Cricket Ground, Krefeld
Umpires: Nitin Bathi (Ned) and David McLean (Sco)
Player of the match: Benjamin Ward (Jer)

- Jersey won the toss and elected to bat.
- Bashir Ahmad (Sui) made his T20I debut.

10 July 2024
09:00
Scorecard

Croatia; 103/9 (18 overs)	v	Serbia; 75/8 (18 overs)
Zach Vukusic 40 (26); Mark Pavlovic 4/16 (4 overs)		Leslie Dunbar 19 (24); Daniel Turkich 3/16 (4 overs)

Croatia won by 28 runs
Bayer Uerdingen Cricket Ground, Krefeld
Umpires: Nitin Bathi (Ned) and Jonathan Kennedy (Ire)
Player of the match: Zach Vukusic (Cro)

- Serbia won the toss and elected to field.
- The match was reduced to 18 overs per side due to rain.

10 July 2024
13:00
Scorecard

Jersey; 198/7 (20 overs)	v	Belgium; 90/9 (20 overs)
Charlie Brennan 40* (22); Khalid Ahmadi 3/40 (4 overs)		Burhan Niaz 29 (15); Benjamin Ward 4/12 (4 overs)

Jersey won by 108 runs
Bayer Uerdingen Cricket Ground, Krefeld
Umpires: Rizwan Akram (Ned) and Mike Burns (Eng)
Player of the match: Benjamin Ward (Jer)

- Belgium won the toss and elected to field.

11 July 2024
17:00
Scorecard

Switzerland; 146/9 (20 overs)	v	Serbia; 106 (19 overs)
Idrees Ul Haque 34 (27); Mark Pavlovic 2/12 (4 overs)		Leslie Dunbar 21 (23); Abdullah Rana 3/16 (3 overs)

Switzerland won by 40 runs
Bayer Uerdingen Cricket Ground, Krefeld
Umpires: Nitin Bathi (Ned) and Mark Jameson (Ger)
Player of the match: Abdullah Rana (Sui)

- Switzerland won the toss and elected to bat.

12 July 2024
13:00
Scorecard

Croatia	v	Jersey

Match abandoned
Bayer Uerdingen Cricket Ground, Krefeld
Umpires: Nitin Bathi (Ned) and David McLean (Sco)

- No toss.
- No play was possible due to rain.

12 July 2024
17:00
Scorecard

Belgium; 179/5 (15 overs)	v	Serbia; 102/3 (15 overs)
Muhammad Muneeb 54 (39); Vukasin Zimonjic 1/27 (3 overs)		Simo Ivetic 49* (43); Khalid Ahmadi 2/18 (2 overs)

Belgium won by 77 runs
Bayer Uerdingen Cricket Ground, Krefeld
Umpires: Mike Burns (Eng) and David McLean (Sco)
Player of the match: Muhammad Muneeb (Bel)

- Belgium won the toss and elected to bat.
- The match was reduced to 15 overs per side due to rain.

13 July 2024
13:00
Scorecard

Croatia; 104/7 (20 overs)	v	Switzerland; 106/3 (12.3 overs)
Phillip Roberts 39* (36); Kenardo Fletcher 3/15 (4 overs)		Ahmed Hassan 32* (18); Aman Maheshwari 1/17 (2 overs)

Switzerland won by 7 wickets
Bayer Uerdingen Cricket Ground, Krefeld
Umpires: Rizwan Akram (Ned) and Jonathan Kennedy (Ire)
Player of the match: Kenardo Fletcher (Sui)

- Switzerland won the toss and elected to field.
- Jaikumar Thakur (Cro) made his T20I debut.

=== Group B ===
Group B standings
Pos	Team	Pld	W	L	NR	Pts	NRR	Qualification
1	Norway	4	4	0	0	8	2.709	Advanced to the final
2	Germany (H)	4	2	1	1	5	0.583	Advanced to the 3rd place play-off
3	Sweden	4	2	2	0	4	1.895	Eliminated
4	Slovenia	4	1	2	1	3	−3.363	Eliminated
5	Gibraltar	4	0	4	0	0	−2.126	Eliminated

Source: ESPNcricinfo
(H) Host

8 July 2024
09:00
Scorecard

Germany; 183 (19.4 overs)	v	Gibraltar; 139/6 (20 overs)
Harmanjot Singh 58 (33); Samarth Bodha 4/33 (3.4 overs)		Iain Latin 58* (38); Muslim Yar 2/15 (4 overs)

Germany won by 44 runs
Bayer Uerdingen Cricket Ground, Krefeld
Umpires: Mike Burns (Eng) and David McLean (Sco)
Player of the match: Harmanjot Singh (Ger)

- Gibraltar won the toss and elected to field.
- Mussadiq Ahmed, Ben Kohler-Cadmore (Ger) and Michael Raikes (Gib) all made their T20I debuts.

8 July 2024
13:00
Scorecard

Norway; 185/8 (20 overs)	v	Sweden; 132 (17 overs)
Walid Ghauri 59 (36); Khalid Zahid 2/27 (4 overs)		Ajay Mundra 41 (33); Wahidullah Sahak 3/17 (4 overs)

Norway won by 53 runs
Bayer Uerdingen Cricket Ground, Krefeld
Umpires: Rizwan Akram (Ned) and Jonathan Kennedy (Ire)
Player of the match: Walid Ghauri (Nor)

- Sweden won the toss and elected to field.
- Mandeep Singh (Nor), Sandeep Mallidi and Ajay Mundra (Swe) all made their T20I debuts.

9 July 2024
09:00
Scorecard

Slovenia; 49 (15.5 overs)	v	Norway; 51/2 (6 overs)
Tarun Sharma 19 (25); Anil Parmar 3/5 (2.5 overs)		Khizer Ahmed 29 (20); Izaz Ali 1/11 (1 over)

Norway won by 8 wickets
Bayer Uerdingen Cricket Ground, Krefeld
Umpires: Rizwan Akram (Ned) and Mark Jameson (Ger)
Player of the match: Raza Iqbal (Nor)

- Slovenia won the toss and elected to bat.

9 July 2024
13:00
Scorecard

Germany; 220/4 (20 overs)	v	Sweden; 218/9 (20 overs)
Harmanjot Singh 70 (35); Sami Rahmani 1/22 (2 overs)		Choudry Share Ali 58 (27); Zahid Zadran 2/26 (4 overs)

Germany won by 2 runs
Bayer Uerdingen Cricket Ground, Krefeld
Umpires: Nitin Bathi (Ned) and Jonathan Kennedy (Ire)
Player of the match: Harmanjot Singh (Ger)

- Germany won the toss and elected to bat.

10 July 2024
17:00
Scorecard

Gibraltar; 136/9 (20 overs)	v	Slovenia; 137/9 (19.3 overs)
Avinash Pai 31 (30); Izaz Ali 2/13 (2 overs)		Shoaib Siddiqui 27 (25); Louis Bruce 3/24 (3 overs)

Slovenia won by 1 wicket
Bayer Uerdingen Cricket Ground, Krefeld
Umpires: Mike Burns (Eng) and Mark Jameson (Ger)
Player of the match: Izaz Ali (Svn)

- Gibraltar won the toss and elected to bat.

11 July 2024
09:00
Scorecard

Norway; 162 (19.4 overs)	v	Germany; 151 (19.3 overs)
Khizer Ahmed 40 (19); Fayaz Khan 5/19 (4 overs)		Fayaz Khan 64 (35); Sher Sahak 3/18 (4 overs)

Norway won by 11 runs
Bayer Uerdingen Cricket Ground, Krefeld
Umpires: Rizwan Akram (Ned) and Mike Burns (Eng)
Player of the match: Fayaz Khan (Ger)

- Germany won the toss and elected to field.
- Fayaz Khan (Ger) took his first five-wicket haul in T20Is.

11 July 2024
13:00
Scorecard

Gibraltar; 99/9 (20 overs)	v	Sweden; 103/2 (9.2 overs)
Kieron Ferrary 30 (21); Abdul Naser Baluch 2/11 (4 overs)		Imal Zuwak 45 (23); Kieron Ferrary 2/22 (2.2 overs)

Sweden won by 8 wickets
Bayer Uerdingen Cricket Ground, Krefeld
Umpires: Mark Jameson (Ger) and David McLean (Sco)
Player of the match: Imal Zuwak (Swe)

- Sweden won the toss and elected to field.
- Jawid Stanigze (Swe) made his T20I debut.

12 July 2024
09:00
Scorecard

Germany	v	Slovenia

Match abandoned
Bayer Uerdingen Cricket Ground, Krefeld
Umpires: Mark Jameson (Ger) and Jonathan Kennedy (Ire)

- No toss.
- No play was possible due to rain.

13 July 2024
09:00
Scorecard

Norway; 175/5 (19.3 overs)	v	Gibraltar; 126/6 (13 overs)
Wahidullah Sahak 71* (32); Kieron Ferrary 3/26 (4 overs)		Kayron Stagno 65 (26); Anil Parmar 4/17 (3 overs)

Norway won by 6 runs (DLS method)
Bayer Uerdingen Cricket Ground, Krefeld
Umpires: Nitin Bathi (Ned) and David McLean (Sco)
Player of the match: Wahidullah Sahak (Nor)

- Norway won the toss and elected to bat.
- Gibraltar were set a revised target of 133 runs in 13 overs due to rain.
- Mofassar Saeed (Nor) made his T20I debut

13 July 2024
17:00
Scorecard

Slovenia; 101 (18.4 overs)	v	Sweden; 105/4 (9.4 overs)
Sudhakar Koppolu 34* (29); Prashant Shukla 3/7 (4 overs)		Ajay Mundra 56* (29); Shoaib Siddiqui 3/26 (4 overs)

Sweden won by 6 wickets
Bayer Uerdingen Cricket Ground, Krefeld
Umpires: Rizwan Akram (Ned) and Mike Burns (Eng)
Player of the match: Ajay Mundra (Swe)

- Sweden won the toss and elected to field.

== Play-offs ==
Matches for 5th and 7th place had been scheduled for 14 July but could not be held, as the tournament had to be held on a single ground as the second ground at GelsenTrabPark, Gelsenkirchen was not approved by the ICC.

=== 3rd place play-off ===
14 July 2024
10:30
Scorecard

Croatia; 98/7 (20 overs)	v	Germany; 100/2 (7.2 overs)
Zach Vukusic 25 (16); Venkatraman Ganesan 3/21 (4 overs)		Mussadiq Ahmed 48 (25); Daniel Turkich 1/22 (2 overs)

Germany won by 8 wickets
Bayer Uerdingen Cricket Ground, Krefeld
Umpires: Nitin Bathi (Ned) and David McLean (Sco)
Player of the match: Venkatraman Ganesan (Ger)

- Croatia won the toss and elected to bat.
- Adil Khan (Ger) and Oliver Tilley (Cro) both made their T20I debuts.

=== Final ===
14 July 2024
15:30
Scorecard

Norway; 69 (15.4 overs)	v	Jersey; 71/4 (7.1 overs)
Khizer Ahmed 16 (15); Benjamin Ward 3/9 (4 overs)		Asa Tribe 23* (15); Vinay Ravi 4/31 (4 overs)

Jersey won by 6 wickets
Bayer Uerdingen Cricket Ground, Krefeld
Umpires: Mike Burns (Eng) and Jonathan Kennedy (Ire)
Player of the match: Benjamin Ward (Jer)

- Jersey won the toss and elected to field.
