= 2025 Malawi Quad Nations T20 Cup =

International cricket tournament

- Dates: 5 – 12 July 2025
- Administrator: Cricket Malawi
- Cricket format: Twenty20 International
- Tournament format(s): Double round-robin and playoffs
- Host: Malawi
- Champions: Tanzania
- Runners-up: Bahrain
- Participants: 4
- Matches: 14
- Most runs: (Tanzania) Arun Yadav (318)
- Most wickets: (Tanzania) Ally Kimote (13)

The 2025 Malawi Quad Nations Cup (Arjun Menon Memorial) was a men's Twenty20 International (T20I) cricket tournament played in Blantyre, Malawi from 5 to 14 July 2025. Organised by Cricket Malawi, all the matches were played at the TCA Oval and was the format was a double round-robin format followed by a 3rd place play-off and final. The event honoured the late Arjun Menon, former head of cricket operations for Cricket Malawi. According to the Malawi National Council of Sports, this tournament was "one of the most prestigious cricket events ever hosted in Malawi". This was the first ever multi-team T20I tournament to be played in Malawi.

Four teams competed: hosts Malawi along with the national teams of Bahrain, Germany and Tanzania. This was the first international assignment for Tanzania under their new head coach Salieg Nackerdien, whose son Imran Nackerdien had earlier coached the Tanzanian men's under-19 team to their first-ever Under-19 World Cup and the senior women's team to a title win at the 2025 Kwibuka T20 competition.

On 4 July, a day before the tournament began, the schedule saw slight changes (including the game between Bahrain and Tanzania getting shifted from 5 July to 8 July) due to an equipment delay.

== Squads ==
Bahrain	Germany	Malawi	Tanzania
Ahmer Bin Nasir (c); Abdul Majid Abbasi; Fiaz Ahmed; Sohail Ahmed; Asif Ali; Imran Anwar; Junaid Aziz; Muhammed Basil; Rizwan Butt; Ali Dawood; Imran Khan; Prashant Kurup (wk); Shashank Shukla; Abdullah Mohd Yousuf	Harmanjot Singh (c); Abdul Bashir; Abdul Shakoor; Shahid Afridi; Ghulam Ahmadi; Musaddiq Ahmed; Adil Khan; Fayaz Khan; Hassan Khan; Kyle Klesse (wk); Jatinder Kumar; Sajid Liaqat; Sachin Mandy; Muslim Yar	Donnex Kansonkho (c); Sami Sohail (vc); Bright Balala; Chisomo Chete; Daniel Jakiel; Gift Kansonkho; Aaftab Limdawala; Chisomo Malaya; Salim Nihute (wk); Kennedy Nltunduwatha; Blessings Pondani; Kazim Somani; Chisomo Tchale; Suhail Vayani	Kassim Nassoro (c); Ajith Augastin; Laksh Bakrania; Shaikh Basha; Raymond Francis; Ally Hafidhi; Acrey Hugo (wk); Khalidy Juma; Salum Jumbe; Ally Kimote; Simba Mbaki; Dhrumit Mehta; Mukesh Suthar; Arun Yadav

== Round-robin ==
=== Points table ===
Pos	Team	Pld	W	L	NR	Pts	NRR
1	Bahrain	6	4	1	1	9	2.607
2	Tanzania	6	3	2	1	7	0.667
3	Germany	6	2	3	1	5	−0.413
4	Malawi	6	1	4	1	3	−2.615

Source: ESPNcricinfo

=== Fixtures ===
5 July 2025
13:45
Scorecard

Malawi; 144/8 (20 overs)	v	Germany; 145/5 (16.4 overs)
Sami Sohail 68 (43); Shahid Afridi 3/26 (4 overs)		Kyle Klesse 38 (31); Bright Balala 1/6 (1 over)

Germany won by 5 wickets
TCA Oval, Blantyre
Umpires: Mazizi Gampu (SA) and Siphelele Gasa (SA)
Player of the match: Shahid Afridi (Ger)

- Germany won the toss and elected to field.
- Trust Makaya, Salim Nihute (Mwi), Hassan Khan, Kyle Klesse and Jatinder Kumar (Ger) all made their T20I debuts.

6 July 2025
09:30
Scorecard

Tanzania; 192/4 (20 overs)	v	Malawi; 120/7 (20 overs)
Arun Yadav 86 (64); Daniel Jakiel 2/29 (4 overs)		Salim Nihute 40* (40); Ally Kimote 3/17 (4 overs)

Tanzania won by 72 runs
TCA Oval, Blantyre
Umpires: Mazizi Gampu (SA) and Sunil Gowda (Ger)
Player of the match: Arun Yadav (Tan)

- Malawi won the toss and elected to field.
- Ajith Augastin, Acrey Hugo, Mukesh Suthar and Arun Yadav (Tan) all made their T20I debuts.

6 July 2025
13:45
Scorecard

Bahrain; 207/2 (20 overs)	v	Germany; 161/8 (20 overs)
Fiaz Ahmed 105* (57); Sajid Liaqat 1/29 (3 overs)		Fayaz Khan 31 (16); Rizwan Butt 3/25 (4 overs)

Bahrain won by 46 runs
TCA Oval, Blantyre
Umpires: Siphelele Gasa (SA) and Osman Mhango (Mwi)
Player of the match: Fiaz Ahmed (Bhr)

- Bahrain won the toss and elected to bat.
- Fiaz Ahmed became the first cricketer for Bahrain to score a century in men's T20Is.

7 July 2025
09:30
Scorecard

Tanzania; 135/9 (20 overs)	v	Germany; 137/6 (18 overs)
Kassim Nassoro 32 (25); Ghulam Ahmadi 2/17 (2 overs)		Musaddiq Ahmed 63 (39); Arun Yadav 3/12 (2 overs)

Germany won by 4 wickets
TCA Oval, Blantyre
Umpires: Mazizi Gampu (SA) and Osman Mhango (Mwi)
Player of the match: Musaddiq Ahmed (Ger)

- Tanzania won the toss and elected to bat.
- Arun Yadav (Tan) took his first hat-trick in T20Is.

7 July 2025
13:45
Scorecard

Malawi; 109/9 (20 overs)	v	Bahrain; 111/3 (14.4 overs)
Sami Sohail 48 (38); Imran Anwar 2/13 (3 overs)		Asif Ali 33 (22); Sami Sohail 1/16 (4 overs)

Bahrain won by 7 wickets
TCA Oval, Blantyre
Umpires: Siphelele Gasa (SA) and Sunil Gowda (Ger)
Player of the match: Abdul Majid Abbasi (Bhr)

- Malawi won the toss and elected to bat.
- Kazim Somani (Mwi) made his T20I debut.

8 July 2025
13:45
Scorecard

Bahrain; 209/5 (20 overs)	v	Tanzania; 215/4 (19.2 overs)
Fiaz Ahmed 61 (35); Ally Kimote 2/45 (4 overs)		Arun Yadav 84 (32); Asif Ali 1/10 (1 over)

Tanzania won by 6 wickets
TCA Oval, Blantyre
Umpires: Sunil Gowda (Ger) and Osman Mhango (Mwi)
Player of the match: Arun Yadav (Tan)

- Tanzania won the toss and elected to field.

9 July 2025
09:30
Scorecard

Malawi	v	Tanzania

Match abandoned
TCA Oval, Blantyre
Umpires: Siphelele Gasa (SA) and Sunil Gowda (Ger)

- No toss.
- No play was possible due to rain.

9 July 2025
13:45
Scorecard

Bahrain	v	Germany

Match abandoned
TCA Oval, Blantyre
Umpires: Mazizi Gampu (SA) and Osman Mhango (Mwi)

- No toss.
- No play was possible due to rain.

10 July 2025
09:30
Scorecard

Tanzania; 154/7 (20 overs)	v	Bahrain; 157/4 (16.2 overs)
Mukesh Suthar 67* (47); Imran Anwar 3/25 (4 overs)		Fiaz Ahmed 60* (39); Ally Kimote 2/26 (4 overs)

Bahrain won by 6 wickets
TCA Oval, Blantyre
Umpires: Sunil Gowda (Ger) and Osman Mhango (Mwi)
Player of the match: Imran Anwar (Bhr)

- Bahrain won the toss and elected to field.

10 July 2025
13:45
Scorecard

Malawi; 166/8 (20 overs)	v	Germany; 158 (19.5 overs)
Aaftab Limdawala 68 (49); Sajid Liaqat 3/29 (3 overs)		Sachin Mandy 50* (35); Aaftab Limdawala 4/23 (3.5 overs)

Malawi won by 8 runs
TCA Oval, Blantyre
Umpires: Mazizi Gampu (SA) and Siphelele Gasa (SA)
Player of the match: Aaftab Limdawala (Mwi)

- Malawi won the toss and elected to bat.
- Kennedy Nltunduwatha (Mwi) made his T20I debut.
- Aaftab Limdawala (Mwi) became the first player for Malawi to take a hat-trick in men's T20Is.

12 July 2025
09:30
Scorecard

Malawi; 72 (14.5 overs)	v	Bahrain; 76/0 (6.5 overs)
Aaftab Limdawala 27 (21); Rizwan Butt 6/9 (3.5 overs)		Ahmer Bin Nasir 52* (28)

Bahrain won by 10 wickets
TCA Oval, Blantyre
Umpires: Mazizi Gampu (SA) and Sunil Gowda (Ger)
Player of the match: Rizwan Butt (Bhr)

- Malawi won the toss and elected to bat.
- Shashank Shukla (Bhr) made his T20I debut.

12 July 2025
13:45
Scorecard

Germany; 140 (18.4 overs)	v	Tanzania; 146/5 (16.5 overs)
Sachin Mandy 50 (40); Salum Jumbe 2/7 (2 overs)		Ajith Augastin 56 (40); Sajid Liaqat 2/20 (3 overs)

Tanzania won by 5 wickets
TCA Oval, Blantyre
Umpires: Siphelele Gasa (SA) and Osman Mhango (Mwi)
Player of the match: Ajith Augastin (Tan)

- Tanzania won the toss and elected to field.
- Raymond Francis (Tan) made his T20I debut.

== 3rd place play-off ==
13 July 2025
09:30
Scorecard

Germany; 219/7 (20 overs)	v	Malawi; 182/7 (20 overs)
Musaddiq Ahmed 107 (53); Chisomo Tchale 2/36 (4 overs)		Salim Nihute 56 (33); Shahid Afridi 3/15 (2 overs)

Germany won by 37 runs
TCA Oval, Blantyre
Umpires: Sunil Gowda (Ger) and Osman Mhango (Mwi)
Player of the match: Musaddiq Ahmed (Ger)

- Germany won the toss and elected to bat.
- Chisomo Tchale (Mwi) made his T20I debut.
- Musaddiq Ahmed became the first cricketer for Germany to score a century in men's T20Is.
- Shahid Afridi (Ger) took his first hat-trick in T20Is.

== Final ==
13 July 2025
13:45
Scorecard

Bahrain; 89 (19 overs)	v	Tanzania; 90/0 (10.1 overs)
Junaid Aziz 28 (36); Ally Kimote 3/12 (3 overs)		Arun Yadav 48* (32)

Tanzania won by 10 wickets
TCA Oval, Blantyre
Umpires: Mazizi Gampu (SA) and Siphelele Gasa (SA)
Player of the match: Salum Jumbe (Tan)

- Tanzania won the toss and elected to field.
