= 2021 Germany Tri-Nation Series =

International cricket tournament

- Date: 5–8 August 2021
- Location: Germany
- Result: Germany won the tournament
Teams
France	Germany	Norway
Captains
Usman Shahid	Venkatraman Ganesan	Raza Iqbal
Most runs
Usman Shahidi (96)	Harmanjot Singh (152)	Sher Sahak (118)
Most wickets
Usman Shahidi (5) Rahmatullah Mangal (5)	Sajid Liaqat (9)	Raza Iqbal (7)

The 2021 Germany Tri-Nation Series was a Twenty20 International (T20I) cricket tournament that took place in Germany between 5 and 8 August 2021. It was originally due to be played in May 2021, but was postponed due to a new lockdown in Germany caused by the COVID-19 pandemic.

The participating teams were the hosts Germany, along with France and Norway. Spain were also scheduled to participate in what would then have been a quadrangular event, but withdrew on 28 July due to COVID-19-related travel restrictions. The matches were all played at the Bayer Uerdingen Cricket Ground, part of the German Cricket Federation's National Performance Centre in the city of Krefeld. These were the first official T20I matches to be played in Germany since the International Cricket Council (ICC) granted full T20I status to all competitive matches between its members from 1 January 2019.

Germany won the tournament, beating Norway by six wickets in the final.

== Squads ==
France	Germany	Norway
Usman Shahid (c); Jubaid Ahamed; Dawood Ahmadzai; Virk Ali; Noman Amjad; Mobashar Ashraf; Lingeswaran Canessane; Naim Daoudzai; Abdulmalik Jabarkhel; Ibrahim Jabarkhel; Hevit Jackson (wk); Alestin Johnmary; Usman Khan; Rahmatullah Mangal; Mustafa Omer; Suventhiran Santhirakumaran; Shikdar Yeasin	Venkatraman Ganesan (c); Harmanjot Singh (vc); Ghulam Ahmadi; Ahmadschah Ahmadzai; Azmat Ali; Elam Bharathi; Dylan Blignaut; Vijayshankar Chikkannaiah; Husnain Kabeer (wk); Israr Khan; Talha Khan; Sajid Liaqat; Nooruddin Mujadady; Sahir Naqash; Abdul Shakoor; Harish Srinivasan (wk)	Raza Iqbal (c); Kuruge Abeyrathna; Waqas Ahmed; Usman Arif; Prithvi Bhart; Walid Ghauri; Hashir Hussain; Junaid Mehmood (wk); Faizan Mumtaz; Vinay Ravi; Bilal Safdar; Sher Sahak; Wahidullah Sahak; Abdullah Sheikh; Ahmadullah Shinwari; Ehtsham Ul Haq

== Round-robin ==
=== Points table ===
Team	P	W	L	T	NR	Pts	NRR
Germany	4	3	1	0	0	6	+0.809
Norway	4	2	2	0	0	4	+0.365
France	4	1	3	0	0	2	–1.161

=== Fixtures ===
5 August 2021
11:00
Scorecard

Norway; 76 (18.4 overs)	v	Germany; 80/5 (17.1 overs)
Sher Sahak 30 (33); Ghulam Ahmadi 4/5 (4 overs)		Talha Khan 16 (12); Raza Iqbal 2/14 (4 overs)

Germany won by 5 wickets
Bayer Uerdingen Cricket Ground, Krefeld
Umpires: Rizwan Akram (Ned) and Mark Jameson (Ger)
Player of the match: Ghulam Ahmadi (Ger)

- Germany won the toss and elected to field.
- Ghulam Ahmadi, Dylan Blignaut (Ger), Kuruge Abeyrathna, Usman Arif, Faizan Mumtaz, Vinay Ravi, Bilal Safdar, Sher Sahak and Ahmadullah Shinwari (Nor) all made their T20I debuts.

5 August 2021
15:30
Scorecard

Norway; 112/7 (20 overs)	v	France; 113/6 (19.3 overs)
Waqas Ahmed 32* (36); Dawood Ahmadzai 2/10 (4 overs)		Suventhiran Santhirakumaran 34 (39); Raza Iqbal 2/13 (4 overs)

France won by 4 wickets
Bayer Uerdingen Cricket Ground, Krefeld
Umpires: Jason Flannery (Ger) and Vinay Malhotra (Ger)
Player of the match: Suventhiran Santhirakumaran (Fra)

- France won the toss and elected to field.
- Jubaid Ahamed, Dawood Ahmadzai, Virk Ali, Noman Amjad, Mobashar Ashraf, Hevit Jackson, Alestin Johnmary, Usman Khan, Rahmatullah Mangal, Suventhiran Santhirakumaran, Usman Shahid (Fra), Hashir Hussain, Junaid Mehmood and Wahidullah Sahak (Nor) all made their T20I debuts.

6 August 2021
11:00
Scorecard

France; 94/9 (18 overs)	v	Germany; 97/8 (12.2 overs)
Usman Khan 25 (25); Venkatraman Ganesan 2/15 (4 overs)		Harmanjot Singh 68* (34); Usman Shahid 3/29 (3.2 overs)

Germany won by 2 wickets (DLS method)
Bayer Uerdingen Cricket Ground, Krefeld
Umpires: Rizwan Akram (Ned) and Vinay Malhotra (Ger)
Player of the match: Harmanjot Singh (Ger)

- Germany won the toss and elected to field.
- The match was reduced to 18 overs per side due to rain.
- Israr Khan, Nooruddin Mujadady (Ger) and Mustafa Omer (Fra) all made their T20I debuts.

7 August 2021
11:00
Scorecard

Germany; 164/3 (20 overs)	v	France; 116/8 (20 overs)
Vijayshankar Chikkannaiah 81* (58); Usman Shahid 1/22 (3 overs)		Virk Ali 52* (51); Sajid Liaqat 3/34 (4 overs)

Germany won by 48 runs
Bayer Uerdingen Cricket Ground, Krefeld
Umpires: Mark Jameson (Ger) and Vinay Malhotra (Ger)
Player of the match: Vijayshankar Chikkannaiah (Ger)

- France won the toss and elected to field.
- Azmat Ali (Ger), Lingeswaran Canessane and Ibrahim Jabarkhel (Fra) all made their T20I debuts.

7 August 2021
15:30
Scorecard

Norway; 131/8 (20 overs)	v	France; 128/8 (20 overs)
Sher Sahak 29 (15); Usman Khan 3/28 (4 overs)		Usman Shahid 64 (55); Vinay Ravi 2/23 (4 overs)

Norway won by 3 runs
Bayer Uerdingen Cricket Ground, Krefeld
Umpires: Rizwan Akram (Ned) and Jason Flannery (Ger)
Player of the match: Sher Sahak (Nor)

- France won the toss and elected to field.

8 August 2021
11:00
Scorecard

Norway; 185/7 (20 overs)	v	Germany; 134/6 (20 overs)
Wahidullah Sahak 52 (44); Ahmadschah Ahmadzai 2/24 (2 overs)		Harmanjot Singh 49 (40); Wahidullah Sahak 2/24 (4 overs)

Norway won by 51 runs
Bayer Uerdingen Cricket Ground, Krefeld
Umpires: Jason Flannery (Ger) and Mark Jameson (Ger)
Player of the match: Wahidullah Sahak (Nor)

- Germany won the toss and elected to field.
- Ahmadschah Ahmadzai and Husnain Kabeer (Ger) both made their T20I debuts.

== Final ==
8 August 2021
15:30
Scorecard

Norway; 127/8 (20 overs)	v	Germany; 96/4 (13.4 overs)
Bilal Safdar 37* (26); Sajid Liaqat 3/26 (4 overs)		Vijayshankar Chikkannaiah 19 (15); Raza Iqbal 1/14 (3 overs)

Germany won by 6 wickets (DLS method)
Bayer Uerdingen Cricket Ground, Krefeld
Umpires: Rizwan Akram (Ned) and Mark Jameson (Ger)
Player of the match: Sahir Naqash (Ger)

- Norway won the toss and elected to bat.
- Germany were set a revised target of 94 runs from 14 overs due to rain.
