= 2016 ICC Europe Division Two =

ICC world cricket league

2016 World Cricket League Europe Division Two
- Dates: 17 – 20 August 2016
- Administrator: ICC Europe
- Cricket format: 20-over
- Tournament format: Round-robin
- Host: Sweden
- Champions: Germany
- Participants: 6
- Matches: 15
- Most runs: (Israel) Josh Evans (92)
- Most wickets: (Israel) Srinath Arachichige (8)

The 2016 ICC World Cricket League Europe Division Two was an international 20-over cricket tournament played in Stockholm, Sweden, from 17 to 20 August 2016. It was the first official (ICC-approved) international cricket tournament to be played in Sweden.

Six teams participated in the tournament – Germany, Gibraltar, the Isle of Man, Israel, Spain, and Sweden. The tournament was heavily affected by the weather, with five out of the fifteen games being abandoned. The top two teams, Germany and Sweden, qualified for the 2017 ICC Europe Division One event. Germany finished undefeated, while Sweden were level with Israel and Spain on points, but had a superior net run rate. The leading run-scorer was Israel's Josh Evans, while the leading wicket-taker was another Israeli player, Srinath Arachichige.

The tournament featured the first international cricket match between Gibraltar and Spain. That match may also have been the first senior international between the two teams in any sport (Gibraltar being a disputed territory that is claimed by both Spain and the United Kingdom).

== Squads ==
Germany	Gibraltar	Isle of Man
Rishi Pillai (c); Brandon Ess; Kashif Hussain; Khaled Khan; Dushant Kumar; Ehsan Latif; Sajid Liaqat; Shahil Momin; Asad Mohammad; Mudassar Muhammad; Amith Sarma; Tony Verma; Ahmed Wardak; Daniel Weston	Kieron Ferrary (c); Karan Aswani; Mark Bacarese; Scott Chipolina; Julian Freyone; Gareth Gomez; John Hazell; Matthew Hunter; Iain Latin; Kabir Mirpuri; Adam Orfila; Balaji Pai; Chris Phillips; Sebastian Suarez	Philip Littlejohns (c); Matthew Ansell; George Burrows; Kieran Cawte; Christopher Hawke; Daniel Hawke; Adam Killey; Nathan Knights; Daniel Kniveton; Adam McAuley; Sam Mills; Arnie van den Berg; Oliver Webster; Nicholas White
Israel	Spain	Sweden
Eshkol Solomon (c); Srinath Arachichige; Shailesh Bangera; Nir Dokarker; Emanuel Solomon; Josh Evans; Matthew Hoffman; Eitamar Kahamker; David Massil; Shifron Nagaonkar; Yaniv Razpurker; Raphael Schachat; Ronen Waskar; Shifron Waskar	Christian Muñoz-Mills (c); Farzan Afzal; Awais Ahmed; Nisar Ahmed; Zulqarnain Haider; Tanveer Iqbal; Armghan Khan; Kuldeep Lal; Farhat Mahmood; Atif Mehmood; Talat Nadeem; Ravi Panchal; Jamie Roper; Mukhtar Singh	Azam Khalil (c); Khalid Ahmad; Usman Arif; Muhammad Asif; Shahzeb Choudhry; Wakil Jalali; Rahel Khan; Azam Mohammad; Mohammad Naveed; Salman Niazi; Sadat Sidiqi; Shahid Mustafa; Sweed Ullah; Afzal Virk; Bilal Zaigham

== Points table ==
Qualified for 2017 ICC World Cricket League Europe Region Division One

Pos	Team	Pld	W	L	T	NR	Pts	NRR
1	Germany	5	3	0	0	2	8	3.070
2	Sweden	5	2	1	0	2	6	2.126
3	Spain	5	2	1	0	2	6	0.540
4	Israel	5	2	1	0	2	6	0.284
5	Isle of Man	5	1	2	0	2	4	−1.891
6	Gibraltar	5	0	5	0	0	0	−2.060

Source: ESPNcricinfo

== Matches ==
17 August
10:00
Scorecard

Germany; 166/8 (20 overs)	v	Isle of Man; 66 (15.5 overs)

Germany won by 100 runs
Skarpnäck Cricket Ground, Stockholm

17 August
10:00
Scorecard

Gibraltar; 104/6 (20 overs)	v	Israel; 106/5 (14 overs)

Israel won by 5 wickets
Skarpnäck Cricket Ground, Stockholm

17 August
10:00
Scorecard

Spain; 117 (19.4 overs)	v	Sweden; 121/4 (19.3 overs)

Sweden won by 6 wickets
Gärdet Cricket Ground, Stockholm

17 August
15:00
Scorecard

Germany; 69/6 (10 overs)	v	Sweden; 28/3 (5 overs)

Germany won by 7 runs (DLS method)
Gärdet Cricket Ground, Stockholm

17 August
15:00
Scorecard

Gibraltar; 61/3 (12 overs)	v	Isle of Man; 70/1 (9.5 overs)

Isle of Man won by 9 wickets (DLS method)
Skarpnäck Cricket Ground, Stockholm

17 August
15:00
Scorecard

Israel; 83/9 (18 overs)	v	Spain; 84/3 (12.4 overs)

Spain won by 7 wickets
Skarpnäck Cricket Ground, Stockholm

19 August
10:00
Scorecard

Gibraltar; 81/9 (20 overs)	v	Germany; 82/2 (15.4 overs)

Germany won by 8 wickets
Gärdet Cricket Ground, Stockholm

19 August
15:00
Scorecard

Israel; 119/8 (20 overs)	v	Isle of Man; 109/6 (20 overs)

Israel won by 10 runs
Gärdet Cricket Ground, Stockholm

19 August
15:00
Scorecard

Isle of Man	v	Spain

Match abandoned
Skarpnäck Cricket Ground, Stockholm

19 August
15:00
Scorecard

Israel	v	Sweden

Match abandoned
Skarpnäck Cricket Ground, Stockholm

20 August
10:00
Scorecard

Germany	v	Israel

Match abandoned
Skarpnäck Cricket Ground, Stockholm

20 August
10:00
Scorecard

Isle of Man	v	Sweden

Match abandoned
Skarpnäck Cricket Ground, Stockholm

20 August
10:00
Scorecard

Spain; 94 (19.5 overs)	v	Gibraltar; 87/4 (20 overs)

Spain won by 7 runs
Gärdet Cricket Ground, Stockholm

20 August
15:00
Scorecard

Germany	v	Spain

Match abandoned
Skarpnäck Cricket Ground, Stockholm

20 August
15:00
Scorecard

Sweden; 179/6 (20 overs)	v	Gibraltar; 84/9 (20 overs)

Sweden won by 95 runs
Gärdet Cricket Ground, Stockholm

== Statistics ==
=== Most runs ===
The top five run scorers (total runs) are included in this table.

Player	Team	Runs	Inns	Avg	S/R	Highest	100s	50s
Josh Evans	Israel	92	3	46.00	119.48	50	0	1
Bilal Zaigham	Sweden	88	2	44.00	122.22	58	0	1
Iain Latin	Gibraltar	87	5	17.40	90.62	41	0	0
Usman Arif	Sweden	84	3	84.00	164.70	59	0	1
Adam McAuley	Isle of Man	66	3	22.00	83.54	43	0	0

Source: ESPNcricinfo

=== Most wickets ===
The top five wicket takers are listed in this table, listed by wickets taken and then by bowling average.

Player	Team	Overs	Wkts	Ave	SR	Econ	BBI
Srinath Arichichige	Israel	9.0	8	4.50	6.7	4.00	4/13
Usman Arif	Sweden	10.0	6	6.33	10.0	3.80	4/12
Arnie van den Berg	Isle of Man	11.0	6	11.00	11.0	6.00	3/21
Adam Orfila	Gibraltar	5.0	5	6.40	6.0	6.40	4/22
Kuldeep Lal	Spain	8.0	5	8.20	9.6	5.12	3/12

Source: ESPNcricinfo

== See also ==
- European Cricket Championship
