= German cricket team in Belgium in 2019 =

International cricket tour

	Belgium	Germany
- Dates: 11 – 12 May 2019
Captains	Shaheryar Butt	Venkatraman Ganesan

Twenty20 International series
- Results: Germany won the 3-match series 3–0
Most runs	Shaheryar Butt (58)	Vijayshankar Chikkannaiah (101)
Most wickets	Ashiqullah Said (4)	Ahmed Wardak (4)

The Germany cricket team toured Belgium in May 2019 to play three Twenty20 International (T20I) matches. These were the first T20I fixtures to be played by either team, after the International Cricket Council announced that all matches played between Associate Members after 1 January 2019 would have the full T20I status. The series took place on 11 and 12 May 2019 at the Royal Brussels Cricket Club in Waterloo, just south of Brussels, with Germany using the fixtures as part of their preparation for the European Regional Qualifying tournament for the 2019 ICC T20 World Cup Qualifier. Germany won the series 3-0.

== Squads ==
Belgium	Germany
Shaheryar Butt (c); Saqlain Ali; Waqas Ali; Murid Ekrami; Soheel Hussain; Syed Jamil; Noman Kamawi; Mamoon Latif; Aziz Mohammad; Noor Momand (wk); Abdul Rashid; Ashiqullah Said; Zaki Shah; Saber Zakhil	Venkatraman Ganesan (c); Vijayshankar Chikkannaiah; Izatullah Dawlatzai; Talha Khan; Sajid Liaqat; Amir Mangal; Asad Mohammad; Mudassar Muhammad; Sahir Naqash; Amith Sarma; Abdul Shakoor; Harmanjot Singh; Harish Srinivasan; Ahmed Wardak; Daniel Weston (wk); Muslim Yar

== T20I series ==
=== 1st T20I ===
11 May 2019
11:00
Scorecard

Germany; 128/7 (20 overs)	v	Belgium; 119/6 (20 overs)
Harmanjot Singh 39* (27); Murid Ekrami 1/10 (1 over)		Shaheryar Butt 30* (27); Ahmed Wardak 3/31 (4 overs)

Germany won by 9 runs
Royal Brussels Cricket Club, Waterloo
Umpires: Mark Jameson (Ger) and Andrew Scott (Bel)
Player of the match: Ahmed Wardak (Ger)

- Belgium won the toss and elected to field.
- Shaheryar Butt, Murid Ekrami, Syed Jamil, Noman Kamawi, Mamoon Latif, Aziz Mohammad, Noor Momand, Abdul Rashid, Ashiqullah Said, Zaki Shah, Saber Zakhil (Bel), Vijayshankar Chikkannaiah, Venkatraman Ganesan, Sajid Liaqat, Mudassar Muhammad, Amith Sarma, Abdul Shakoor, Harmanjot Singh, Ahmed Wardak, Daniel Weston and Muslim Yar (Ger) all made their T20I debuts.
- Izatullah Dawlatzai also made his T20I debut for Germany after previously playing four T20Is for Afghanistan, becoming the eighth cricketer to represent two international teams in T20Is.

=== 2nd T20I ===
11 May 2019
15:00
Scorecard

Germany; 149/6 (20 overs)	v	Belgium; 87 (14.4 overs)
Amir Mangal 40 (20); Ashiqullah Said 2/34 (4 overs)		Saber Zakhil 18 (11); Sahir Naqash 2/3 (1 over)

Germany won by 62 runs
Royal Brussels Cricket Club, Waterloo
Umpires: Mark Jameson (Ger) and Andrew Scott (Bel)
Player of the match: Talha Khan (Ger)

- Germany won the toss and elected to bat.
- Saqlain Ali, Waqas Ali (Bel), Amir Mangal, Talha Khan, Sahir Naqash and Asad Mohammad (Ger) all made their T20I debuts.

=== 3rd T20I ===
12 May 2019
10:30
Scorecard

Belgium; 133/6 (20 overs)	v	Germany; 135/4 (18 overs)
Murid Ekrami 28 (31); Abdul Shakoor 2/23 (4 overs)		Vijayshankar Chikkannaiah 70* (65); Zaki Shah 1/18 (3 overs)

Germany won by 6 wickets
Royal Brussels Cricket Club, Waterloo
Umpires: Mark Jameson (Ger) and Andrew Scott (Bel)
Player of the match: Vijayshankar Chikkannaiah (Ger)

- Germany won the toss and elected to field.
- Soheel Hussain (Bel) and Harish Srinivasan (Ger) both made their T20I debuts.
