= 2022 Men's T20 World Cup Global Qualifier A =

Cricket tournament

2022 ICC Men's T20 World Cup Global Qualifier A
- Dates: 18 – 24 February 2022
- Administrator: ICC
- Cricket format: Twenty20 International
- Host: Oman
- Champions: United Arab Emirates
- Runners-up: Ireland
- Participants: 8
- Matches: 20
- Player of the series: (United Arab Emirates) Vriitya Aravind
- Most runs: (United Arab Emirates) Vriitya Aravind (267)
- Most wickets: (Nepal) Sandeep Lamichhane (12)

The 2022 ICC Men's T20 World Cup Global Qualifier A was a cricket tournament that took place in February 2022 in Oman, as one of two global tournaments that together formed the final stage of the qualification process for the 2022 ICC Men's T20 World Cup. In April 2018, the International Cricket Council (ICC) granted full international status to Twenty20 men's matches played between member sides from 1 January 2019 onwards. Therefore, all the matches in the Global Qualifiers were Twenty20 Internationals (T20Is).

Global Qualifier A was contested by eight teams that advanced from their Regional Finals, were eliminated in the first round of the 2021 ICC Men's T20 World Cup, or were among the highest ranked sides not already qualified to this stage. The eight teams were placed in two groups, with two sides from each group advancing to the semi-finals. Both finalists of the Global Qualifier advanced to the 2022 ICC Men's T20 World Cup in Australia.

Immediately prior to the Global Qualifier, Ireland, Nepal, Oman and the United Arab Emirates played in a quadrangular series at the same venue. Canada and Germany played two warm-up matches against each other, while Bahrain planned friendlies against Nepal and Philippines. In another practice fixture, Canada beat Bahrain by 38 runs. The Philippines, making their debut in a global qualifier, had not played a game for three years since securing their place in the event, and some of their players had never met before the squad assembled in Oman.

Ireland finished top of their group to secure a place in the semi-finals. The UAE also qualified for the semi-finals as runners-up in their group despite a two-run defeat to Bahrain in their last game. Vriitya Aravind scored 24 runs in the final over to ensure that the UAE finished the group with a superior net run rate than Bahrain. Nepal finished top of the other group as the only unbeaten side in the group stage, with Oman also progressing as runners-up. In the semi-finals, Ireland beat Oman by 56 runs, and the UAE beat Nepal by 68 runs, with both teams qualifying for the T20 World Cup. The UAE beat Ireland in the final by seven wickets, following a century from Muhammad Waseem. Although both finalists had already secured their places at the T20 World Cup, the result of the final determined the groups they would be placed in.

== Teams and qualifications ==
Sub-regional qualification stages were scheduled to begin on 24 June 2021 with the European qualifier in Finland. But a number of these regional tournaments were either postponed or cancelled owing to the COVID-19 pandemic. A total of 65 Associate Member teams participated in the regional qualification stage. The teams that advanced from this stage, joined Nepal and United Arab Emirates, who had qualified via T20I rankings along with Ireland and Oman who qualified via the 2021 Men's T20 World Cup.

Means of qualification	Date	Host	Berths	Qualified
Automatic qualifications
ICC Men's T20I Team Rankings	December 2020	—N/a	2	Nepal; United Arab Emirates
2021 Men's T20 World Cup	14 November 2021	Oman; United Arab Emirates	2	Ireland; Oman
Regional qualifications
Asia	22–28 July 2019	Qatar	1	Bahrain
East Asia-Pacific	11 – 16 October 2021	Japan	1	Philippines (Note: Philippines qualified for the global qualifier as the highest-ranked team in EAP region after the regional tournament was cancelled due to COVID-19.)
Europe	15 – 21 October 2021	Spain	1	Germany
Americas	7 – 14 November 2021	Antigua and Barbuda	1	Canada
Total			8	

== Squads ==
The following squads were named for the tournament.

Bahrain	Canada	Germany	Ireland
Sarfaraz Ali (c); Fiaz Ahmed; Waseeq Ahmed; Imran Anwar; George Axtell; Junaid Aziz; Shahbaz Badar (wk); Sikander Billah; Haider Butt; Prashant Kurup; Shahid Mahmood; David Mathias; Muhammad Safdar (wk); Umer Toor (wk); Sathaiya Veerapathiran; Muhammad Younis	Navneet Dhaliwal (c); Dillon Heyliger; Rishiv Joshi; Jatinderpal Matharu; Shreyas Movva; Salman Nazar; Rayyan Pathan; Kaleem Sana; Junaid Siddiqui; Ravinderpal Singh; Matthew Spoors; Hamza Tariq (wk); Harsh Thaker; Saad Bin Zafar	Venkatraman Ganesan (c); Ghulam Ahmadi; Elam Bharathi; Dylan Blignaut; Justin Broad; Vijayshankar Chikkannaiah; Fayaz Khan; Shoaib Khan; Talha Khan; Dieter Klein; Faisal Mubashir; Nooruddin Mujadady; Michael Richardson (wk); Muslim Yar	Andrew Balbirnie (c); Paul Stirling (vc); Mark Adair; Curtis Campher; Gareth Delany; George Dockrell; Shane Getkate; Josh Little; Andy McBrine; Barry McCarthy; Simi Singh; Harry Tector; Lorcan Tucker (wk); Craig Young
Nepal	Oman	Philippines	United Arab Emirates
Sandeep Lamichhane (c); Dipendra Singh Airee; Kamal Singh Airee; Lokesh Bam; Kushal Bhurtel; Abinash Bohara; Sagar Dhakal; Gulsan Jha; Gyanendra Malla; Kushal Malla; Jitendra Mukhiya; Aarif Sheikh; Aasif Sheikh (wk); Sharad Vesawkar; Bibek Yadav	Zeeshan Maqsood (c); Khawar Ali; Fayyaz Butt; Nestor Dhamba; Sandeep Goud; Aamir Kaleem; Kaleemullah; Ayaan Khan; Bilal Khan; Shoaib Khan; Naseem Khushi (wk); Mohammad Nadeem; Khurram Nawaz; Kashyap Prajapati; Jatinder Singh	Jonathan Hill (c); Daniel Smith (vc); Jordan Alegre; Machanda Biddappa; Gurbhupinder Chohan; Richard Goodwin; Hern Isorena; Kapil Kumar; Vimal Kumar; Huzaifa Mohammed; Siva Mohan; Miggy Podosky; Grant Russ (wk); Muzammil Shahzad; Henry Tyler	Ahmed Raza (c); Vriitya Aravind (wk); Mohammad Boota (wk); Kashif Daud; Zawar Farid; Basil Hameed; Zahoor Khan; Karthik Meiyappan; Rohan Mustafa; Akif Raja; Alishan Sharafu; Junaid Siddique; Chirag Suri; Muhammad Usman; Muhammad Waseem

Ireland also named Neil Rock and Ben White as travelling reserves. Nepal named Pradeep Airee, Shahab Alam and Kushal Malla as travelling reserves. Karan KC was named in Nepal's squad and travelled to Oman, but was ruled out ahead of the tournament due to injury. Kushal Malla was added to the main squad on 19 February 2022 as a replacement for the injured Sharad Vesawkar. Shahi Fahim was also named as a reserve in Bahrain's travelling squad.

== Group stage ==
=== Group A ===
Pos	Team	Pld	W	L	NR	Pts	NRR
1	Ireland	3	2	1	0	4	0.991
2	United Arab Emirates	3	2	1	0	4	0.667
3	Bahrain	3	2	1	0	4	0.240
4	Germany	3	0	3	0	0	−2.042

Source: ESPN Cricinfo

Advanced to the Semi-Finals
Advanced to the Consolation play-offs

18 February 2022
14:00
Scorecard

United Arab Emirates; 157/5 (20 overs)	v	Ireland; 139/9 (20 overs)
Vriitya Aravind 97* (67); Craig Young 2/34 (4 overs)		Paul Stirling 32 (22); Karthik Meiyappan 3/16 (3 overs)

United Arab Emirates won by 18 runs
Oman Cricket Academy Ground Turf 1, Muscat
Umpires: Adrian Holdstock (SA) and Durga Subedi (Nep)
Player of the match: Vriitya Aravind (UAE)

- United Arab Emirates won the toss and elected to bat.

18 February 2022
14:00
Scorecard

Germany; 106 (16.4 overs)	v	Bahrain; 107/4 (15.4 overs)
Vijayshankar Chikkannaiah 50 (43); Junaid Aziz 5/5 (1.4 overs)		Sarfaraz Ali 69* (38); Dieter Klein 2/15 (3.4 overs)

Bahrain won by 6 wickets
Oman Cricket Academy Ground Turf 2, Muscat
Umpires: Akbar Ali (UAE) and Harikrishna Pillai (Oma)
Player of the match: Junaid Aziz (Bhr)

- Bahrain won the toss and elected to field.
- Shahid Mahmood, David Mathias, Muhammad Safdar, Umer Toor (Bhr) and Justin Broad (Ger) all made their T20I debuts.
- Junaid Aziz became the first bowler for Bahrain to take a five-wicket haul in T20Is.

19 February 2022
14:00
Scorecard

United Arab Emirates; 191/5 (20 overs)	v	Germany; 167/9 (20 overs)
Chirag Suri 81 (54); Fayaz Khan 2/33 (3 overs)		Justin Broad 62 (42); Kashif Daud 4/32 (4 overs)

United Arab Emirates won by 24 runs
Oman Cricket Academy Ground Turf 1, Muscat
Umpires: Rahul Asher (Oma) and Vinod Babu (Oma)
Player of the match: Chirag Suri (UAE)

- United Arab Emirates won the toss and elected to bat.

19 February 2022
14:00
Scorecard

Ireland; 158/5 (20 overs)	v	Bahrain; 137/5 (20 overs)
Gareth Delany 51* (34); Junaid Aziz 2/16 (4 overs)		Sathaiya Veerapathiran 33* (14); Craig Young 3/16 (4 overs)

Ireland won by 21 runs
Oman Cricket Academy Ground Turf 2, Muscat
Umpires: Akbar Ali (UAE) and Durga Subedi (Nep)
Player of the match: Gareth Delany (Ire)

- Ireland won the toss and elected to bat.

21 February 2022
10:00
Scorecard

Germany; 107/7 (20 overs)	v	Ireland; 111/3 (13.1 overs)
Faisal Mubashir 45* (40); Josh Little 2/13 (4 overs)		Paul Stirling 34 (27); Muslim Yar 2/20 (3 overs)

Ireland won by 7 wickets
Oman Cricket Academy Ground Turf 1, Muscat
Umpires: Akbar Ali (UAE) and Harikrishna Pillai (Oma)
Player of the match: Josh Little (Ire)

- Ireland won the toss and elected to field.
- Shoaib Khan (Ger) made his T20I debut.
- Andrew Balbirnie scored his 5,000th run for Ireland across all formats.

21 February 2022
10:00
Scorecard

Bahrain; 172/5 (20 overs)	v	United Arab Emirates; 170/6 (20 overs)
David Mathias 46* (35); Basil Hameed 1/10 (2 overs)		Vriitya Aravind 84* (52); Sarfaraz Ali 2/24 (4 overs)

Bahrain won by 2 runs
Oman Cricket Academy Ground Turf 2, Muscat
Umpires: Rahul Asher (Oma) and Vinod Babu (Oma)
Player of the match: Sarfaraz Ali (Bhr)

- Bahrain won the toss and elected to bat.
- Sikander Billah (Bhr) made his T20I debut.

=== Group B ===
Pos	Team	Pld	W	L	NR	Pts	NRR
1	Nepal	3	3	0	0	6	3.680
2	Oman	3	2	1	0	4	1.650
3	Canada	3	1	2	0	2	1.037
4	Philippines	3	0	3	0	0	−7.466

Source: ESPN Cricinfo

Advanced to the Semi-Finals
Advanced to the Consolation play-offs

18 February 2022
10:00
Scorecard

Nepal; 117/8 (20 overs)	v	Oman; 78 (17 overs)
Aarif Sheikh 38 (37); Khawar Ali 3/30 (4 overs)		Naseem Khushi 24 (18); Kamal Singh Airee 3/15 (3 overs)

Nepal won by 39 runs
Oman Cricket Academy Ground Turf 1, Muscat
Umpires: Akbar Ali (UAE) and Adrian Holdstock (SA)
Player of the match: Aarif Sheikh (Nep)

- Oman won the toss and elected to field.

18 February 2022
10:00
Scorecard

Canada; 216/1 (20 overs)	v	Philippines; 98/5 (20 overs)
Matthew Spoors 108* (66); Huzaifa Mohammed 1/40 (4 overs)		Daniel Smith 35 (36); Saad Bin Zafar 2/14 (4 overs)

Canada won by 118 runs
Oman Cricket Academy Ground Turf 2, Muscat
Umpires: Rahul Asher (Oma) and Vinod Babu (Oma)
Player of the match: Matthew Spoors (Can)

- Philippines won the toss and elected to field.
- Kaleem Sana, Matthew Spoors (Can), Jordan Alegre, Gurbhupinder Chohan, Kapil Kumar, Huzaifa Mohammed and Miggy Podosky (Phi) all made their T20I debuts.
- Matthew Spoors (Can) scored his first century in T20Is, and the highest individual total by a player on T20I debut.

19 February 2022
10:00
Scorecard

Canada; 155/6 (20 overs)	v	Oman; 159/1 (18 overs)
Ravinderpal Singh 46 (36); Fayyaz Butt 2/25 (3 overs)		Zeeshan Maqsood 76* (44); Saad Bin Zafar 1/32 (4 overs)

Oman won by 9 wickets
Oman Cricket Academy Ground Turf 1, Muscat
Umpires: Adrian Holdstock (SA) and Durga Subedi (Nep)
Player of the match: Zeeshan Maqsood (Oma)

- Oman won the toss and elected to field.

19 February 2022
10:00
Scorecard

Nepal; 218/3 (20 overs)	v	Philippines; 82/8 (20 overs)
Kushal Bhurtel 104* (61); Miggy Podosky 1/33 (4 overs)		Jordan Alegre 27* (32); Sandeep Lamichhane 3/9 (4 overs)

Nepal won by 136 runs
Oman Cricket Academy Ground Turf 2, Muscat
Umpires: Vinod Babu (Oma) and Harikrishna Pillai (Oma)
Player of the match: Kushal Bhurtel (Nep)

- Philippines won the toss and elected to field.
- Gulsan Jha (Nep) and Muzammil Shahzad (Phi) both made their T20I debuts.
- Kushal Bhurtel (Nep) scored his first century in T20Is.

21 February 2022
14:00
Scorecard

Canada; 80 (15 overs)	v	Nepal; 81/2 (14.1 overs)
Dillon Heyliger 24* (22); Sandeep Lamichhane 3/12 (4 overs)		Kushal Bhurtel 34* (37); Kaleem Sana 1/14 (3 overs)

Nepal won by 8 wickets
Oman Cricket Academy Ground Turf 1, Muscat
Umpires: Rahul Asher (Oma) and Harikrishna Pillai (Oma)
Player of the match: Sandeep Lamichhane (Nep)

- Canada won the toss and elected to bat.

21 February 2022
14:00
Scorecard

Philippines; 36 (15.2 overs)	v	Oman; 40/1 (2.5 overs)
Daniel Smith 7 (14); Khawar Ali 4/11 (3.2 overs)		Khurram Nawaz 33* (12); Huzaifa Mohammed 1/27 (1.5 overs)

Oman won by 9 wickets
Oman Cricket Academy Ground Turf 2, Muscat
Umpires: Adrian Holdstock (SA) and Durga Subedi (Nep)
Player of the match: Khawar Ali (Oma)

- Philippines won the toss and elected to bat.
- Hern Isorena (Phi) made his T20I debut.

== Consolation play-offs ==
=== Bracket ===
5th Place Semi-finals
A3	Bahrain	191/5
B4	Philippines	100/9
A4	Germany	131/6
B3	Canada	132/4

5th-place play-off
A3	Bahrain	131/8
B3	Canada	132/3
7th-place play-off
B4	Philippines	109/8
A4	Germany	115/1

=== 5th Place semi-finals ===
22 February 2022
10:00
Scorecard

Germany; 131/6 (20 overs)	v	Canada; 132/4 (19.3 overs)
Michael Richardson 35 (26); Salman Nazar 3/27 (4 overs)		Matthew Spoors 73* (55); Dieter Klein 3/31 (4 overs)

Canada won by 6 wickets
Oman Cricket Academy Ground Turf 1, Muscat
Umpires: Harikrishna Pillai (Oma) and Durga Subedi (Nep)
Player of the match: Matthew Spoors (Can)

- Canada won the toss and elected to field.

22 February 2022
10:00
Scorecard

Bahrain; 191/5 (20 overs)	v	Philippines; 100/9 (20 overs)
Prashant Kurup 74 (48); Henry Tyler 3/40 (4 overs)		Machanda Biddappa 26 (33); Haider Butt 3/19 (4 overs)

Bahrain won by 91 runs
Oman Cricket Academy Ground Turf 2, Muscat
Umpires: Akbar Ali (UAE) and Rahul Asher (Oma)
Player of the match: Prashant Kurup (Bhr)

- Bahrain won the toss and elected to bat.
- George Axtell (Bhr) made his T20I debut.

=== 7th-place play-off ===
24 February 2022
10:00
Scorecard

Philippines; 109/8 (20 overs)	v	Germany; 115/1 (12.5 overs)
Daniel Smith 35 (23); Elam Bharathi 4/6 (4 overs)		Michael Richardson 59* (42); Huzaifa Mohammed 1/21 (4 overs)

Germany won by 9 wickets
Oman Cricket Academy Ground Turf 2, Muscat
Umpires: Vinod Babu (Oma) and Harikrishna Pillai (Oma)
Player of the match: Elam Bharathi (Ger)

- Germany won the toss and elected to field.
- Siva Mohan (Phi) made his T20I debut.

=== 5th-place play-off ===
24 February 2022
10:00
Scorecard

Bahrain; 131/8 (20 overs)	v	Canada; 132/3 (14.3 overs)
Sikander Billah 33 (21); Harsh Thaker 4/20 (4 overs)		Navneet Dhaliwal 54* (27); George Axtell 1/17 (3 overs)

Canada won by 7 wickets
Oman Cricket Academy Ground Turf 1, Muscat
Umpires: Akbar Ali (UAE) and Durga Subedi (Nep)
Player of the match: Harsh Thaker (Can)

- Bahrain won the toss and elected to bat.

== Play-offs ==
=== Bracket ===
Semi-finals
A1	Ireland	165/7
B2	Oman	109
A2	United Arab Emirates	175/7
B1	Nepal	107

Final
A1	Ireland	159
A2	United Arab Emirates	160/3
3rd-place play-off
B2	Oman	87/9
B1	Nepal	90/1

=== Semi-finals ===
22 February 2022
14:00
Scorecard

United Arab Emirates; 175/7 (20 overs)	v	Nepal; 107 (18.4 overs)
Muhammad Waseem 70 (48); Jitendra Mukhiya 3/35 (3 overs)		Dipendra Singh Airee 38 (38); Ahmed Raza 5/19 (4 overs)

United Arab Emirates won by 68 runs
Oman Cricket Academy Ground Turf 1, Muscat
Umpires: Rahul Asher (Oma) and Vinod Babu (Oma)
Player of the match: Ahmed Raza (UAE)

- United Arab Emirates won the toss and elected to bat.
- Ahmed Raza became the first bowler for United Arab Emirates to take a five-wicket haul in T20Is.

22 February 2022
14:00
Scorecard

Ireland; 165/7 (20 overs)	v	Oman; 109 (18.3 overs)
Gareth Delany 47 (32); Bilal Khan 3/23 (4 overs)		Shoaib Khan 30 (22); Simi Singh 3/20 (3.3 overs)

Ireland won by 56 runs
Oman Cricket Academy Ground Turf 2, Muscat
Umpires: Akbar Ali (UAE) and Adrian Holdstock (SA)
Player of the match: Andy McBrine (Ire)

- Oman won the toss and elected to field.

=== 3rd-place play-off ===
24 February 2022
14:00
Scorecard

Oman; 87/9 (20 overs)	v	Nepal; 90/1 (16.2 overs)
Zeeshan Maqsood 21 (28); Sandeep Lamichhane 3/13 (4 overs)		Kushal Bhurtel 55* (53); Zeeshan Maqsood 1/21 (3 overs)

Nepal won by 9 wickets
Oman Cricket Academy Ground Turf 2, Muscat
Umpires: Harikrishna Pillai (Oma) and Durga Subedi (Nep)
Player of the match: Sandeep Lamichhane (Nep)

- Oman won the toss and elected to bat.
- Nestor Dhamba (Oma) made his T20I debut.

=== Final ===
24 February 2022
14:00
Scorecard

Ireland; 159 (20 overs)	v	United Arab Emirates; 160/3 (18.4 overs)
Harry Tector 50 (37); Zahoor Khan 3/29 (4 overs)		Muhammad Waseem 112 (66); Josh Little 2/17 (4 overs)

United Arab Emirates won by 7 wickets
Oman Cricket Academy Ground Turf 1, Muscat
Umpires: Rahul Asher (Oma) and Adrian Holdstock (SA)
Player of the match: Muhammad Waseem (UAE)

- Ireland won the toss and elected to bat.

== Final standings ==
These were the final standings following the conclusion of the tournament.

Position	Team
1st	United Arab Emirates
2nd	Ireland
3rd	Nepal
4th	Oman
5th	Canada
6th	Bahrain
7th	Germany
8th	Philippines

1st to 2nd Qualified for the 2022 ICC Men's T20 World Cup.

== See also ==
- 2022 ICC Men's T20 World Cup Global Qualifier B
