= Arjun Menon (coach) =

Singaporean cricket coach (1977–2025)

- Menon in 2025

Personal information
- Born: 1977; Singapore
- Died: 10 May 2025 (aged 48); Blantyre, Malawi
- Role: Wicket-keeper

International information
- National side: Singapore (1996–1999)

Arjun Menon (1977 – 10 May 2025) was a Singaporean cricket coach and player, who represented the Singapore national cricket team and coached a number of teams at an international level, including Chile, Botswana, Malawi, Indonesia, and Singapore.

== Playing career ==
Menon began playing cricket at Saint Patrick's School, Singapore. He represented Singapore at youth level as a wicket-keeper and made his senior debut against the United Arab Emirates in Malaysia. He made five senior appearances for Singapore. He discontinued his international career in 1999 when he moved to Australia to attend university.

== Coaching career ==
Menon was appointed head coach of Chile in the lead-up to the team's inaugural ICC tournament appearance at the 2006 World Cricket League Americas Division Three. In 2010, he was appointed head coach of Botswana, a position he held until 2013. Menon later coached Indonesia at the 2014 ICC East Asia-Pacific Men's Championship.

Menon held various roles with the Singapore Cricket Association from 2015 to 2020, coaching Singapore to a gold medal in T20 cricket at the 2017 Southeast Asian Games. In 2020, he went to Malawi as operations manager of Cricket Malawi on a three-year contract, shortly after the outbreak of the COVID-19 pandemic in Malawi. He coached Malawi at the 2021 ICC Men's T20 World Cup Africa Sub-regional Qualifier A. At the time of his death in May 2025, various sports authorities in Malawi such as Henry Kamata, the CEO of the Malawi National Council of Sports, had attributed the recent progress of the sport in the nation to Menon.

== Death ==
Menon died during an assault by unknown assailants in the area of his residence in Blantyre, Malawi, on 10 May 2025. He was 48. Police have opened investigations into his death.
