= Amir Mangal =

German cricketer (born 1989)

Personal information
- Full name: Amir Khan Mangal
- Born: 1 January 1989 (age 37); Paktia, Afghanistan
- Batting: Right-handed
- Bowling: Right-arm off-break

International information
- National side: Germany
- T20I debut (cap 3): 11 May 2019 v Belgium
- Last T20I: 8 March 2020 v Spain
- Source: Cricinfo, 8 March 2020

Amir Mangal (born 1 January 1989) is a German cricketer who plays for the national team. In May 2019, he was named in Germany's Twenty20 International (T20I) squad for their three-match series against Belgium. The matches were the first T20Is played by the German cricket team. He made his T20I debut for Germany against Belgium on 11 May 2019. Later the same month, he was named in Germany's squad for the Regional Finals of the 2018–19 ICC T20 World Cup Europe Qualifier tournament in Guernsey. He played in Germany's opening match of the Regional Finals, against Guernsey, on 15 June 2019.
