= 2017 ICC World Cricket League Europe Region Division One =

- Dates: 11 – 17 June 2017
- Administrator: International Cricket Council
- Cricket format: Limited-overs (50 overs)
- Tournament format(s): Round-robin and Knockout
- Host: Netherlands
- Champions: Germany (1st title)
- Runners-up: Sweden
- Participants: 6

The 2017 ICC World Cricket League Europe Region Division One was an international cricket tournament that took place in Netherlands in June 2017. The winner of the qualifier progressed to 2017 ICC World Cricket League Division Five which was staged in September 2017.

== Teams ==
Six teams invited by ICC for the tournament:

- Austria
- Belgium
- France
- Germany
- Norway
- Sweden

== Points Table ==
Team	P	W	L	T	NR	Points	NRR	Status
Germany	5	4	1	0	0	8	+2.031	Qualify for 2017 ICC World Cricket League Division Five
Sweden	5	3	2	0	0	6	+0.250	Did not Qualify for 2017 ICC World Cricket League Division Five
Norway	5	3	2	0	0	6	+0.074	Did not Qualify for 2017 ICC World Cricket League Division Five
Austria	5	3	2	0	0	6	-0.548	Did not Qualify for 2017 ICC World Cricket League Division Five
Belgium	5	1	4	0	0	2	-0.614	Did not Qualify for 2017 ICC World Cricket League Division Five
France	5	1	4	0	0	2	-0.978	Did not Qualify for 2017 ICC World Cricket League Division Five
