= Mudassar Muhammad =

German cricketer (born 1981)

Personal information
- Born: 2 April 1981 (age 45); Vehari, Punjab, Pakistan
- Batting: Right-handed
- Bowling: Right-arm off-break

International information
- National side: Germany
- T20I debut (cap 8): 11 May 2019 v Belgium
- Last T20I: 16 June 2019 v Italy
- Source: Cricinfo, 16 June 2019

Mudassar Muhammad (born 2 April 1981) is a German cricketer, who plays for the national team. He was named in Germany's squad for the 2017 ICC World Cricket League Division Five tournament in South Africa. He played in Germany's opening fixture, against Ghana, on 3 September 2017.

In May 2019, he was named in Germany's Twenty20 International (T20I) squad for their three-match series against Belgium. The matches were the first T20Is to be played by the German cricket team. He made his T20I debut against Belgium on 11 May 2019. Later the same month, he was named in Germany's squad for the Regional Finals of the 2018–19 ICC T20 World Cup Europe Qualifier tournament in Guernsey.
