= Izatullah Dawlatzai =

Afghan-German cricketer

Personal information
- Full name: Izatullah Dawlatzai
- Born: 10 May 1991 (age 35); Nangarhar Province, Afghanistan
- Batting: Right-handed
- Bowling: Right-arm medium-fast

International information
- National sides: Afghanistan (2010–2015); Germany (2018–present)
- ODI debut (cap 5): 9 October 2010; Afghanistan v Kenya
- Last ODI: 14 January 2015; Afghanistan v Scotland
- T20I debut (cap 4/5): 14 March 2012; Afghanistan v Netherlands
- Last T20I: 8 March 2020; Germany v Spain

Career statistics
Competition	ODI	T20I	FC	LA
Matches	5	16	8	12
Runs scored	7	26	52	33
Batting average	–	26.00	7.42	8.25
100s/50s	0/0	0/0	0/0	0/0
Top score	6*	24*	18	13*
Balls bowled	210	329	969	507
Wickets	8	18	32	14
Bowling average	18.25	21.22	17.81	26.21
5 wickets in innings	0	0	4	0
10 wickets in match	0	0	1	0
Best bowling	4/38	3/23	6/57	4/38
Catches/stumpings	0/–	3/–	1/–	0/–
- Source: Cricinfo, 8 March 2020

Izatullah Dawlatzai (born 10 May 1991) is an Afghan-German cricketer who has played international cricket for both Afghanistan and Germany. He is a right-handed batsman who bowls right-arm medium-fast.

== Under-19 career ==
Dawlatzai started representing Afghanistan in age-group cricket, which culminated in the Afghanistan Under-19 cricket team qualifying, for the first time, for the 2010 ICC Under-19 Cricket World Cup in New Zealand. Dawlatzai represented the team in all four of their matches during the tournament, where the team was eliminated in the group stage after losing two of their three matches and later lost (to Papua New Guinea) the plate quarter-finals contested by the bottom two teams of the group.

== Career in Afghanistan ==
His debut for the senior team came in a first-class match against Kenya in the 2009-10 ICC Intercontinental Cup. In that match he took his maiden first-class wicket, that of Collins Obuya. Following the first-class match, he made his One Day International debut against Kenya in the 2nd ODI. In what was also his maiden List-A match, he took the wickets of Seren Waters and Collins Obuya for 37 runs.

== Career in Germany ==
Dawlatzai relocated to Germany to join his fiancée, who was born in Germany but is of Afghan descent. They live in Hamburg. In 2017, Dawlatzai was invited to play for Marylebone Cricket Club on its tour of Germany as a special guest. He plays for KSV Cricket Club in Germany. In 2018, he met the residency qualifications for the national team and was selected in the squad for a series against Denmark in July 2018. He was also selected in the squad for 2018-19 ICC World Twenty20 Europe Qualifier and took 2/10 in the first game against Cyprus.

In May 2019, he was named in Germany's Twenty20 International (T20I) squad for their three-match series against Belgium. The matches were the first T20Is to be played by the German cricket team. He made his T20I debut for Germany against Belgium on 11 May 2019 and became the eighth cricketer to play T20 internationals for 2 countries. Later the same month, he was named in Germany's squad for the Regional Finals of the 2018–19 ICC T20 World Cup Europe Qualifier tournament in Guernsey.
