= Imran Nackerdien =

South African cricketer (born 1990)

Personal information
- Full name: Imran Nackerdien
- Born: 21 April 1990 (age 36); South Africa
- Batting: Left-handed
- Bowling: Leg break

Domestic team information
- Years: Team
- 2011–: Boland
- First-class debut: 15 December 2011 Boland v KwaZulu-Natal Inland
- List A debut: 28 January 2012 Boland v Free State

Career statistics
| Competition | First-class | List A |
|---|---|---|
| Matches | 8 | 2 |
| Runs scored | 274 | 49 |
| Batting average | 18.26 | 49.00 |
| 100s/50s | 0/1 | 0/0 |
| Top score | 78 | 48* |
| Balls bowled | 0 | 0 |
| Wickets | - | - |
| Bowling average | - | - |
| 5 wickets in innings | - | - |
| 10 wickets in match | - | - |
| Best bowling | - | - |
| Catches/stumpings | 2/– | 1/– |
- Source: CricketArchive, 1 April 2012

Imran Nackerdien (born 21 April 1990) is a South African cricketer who currently plays for Boland. He is a left-handed batsman and bowls leg break.
