= Malawi Cricket Union =

Cricket Malawi
- Sport: Cricket
- Affiliation: International Cricket Council
- Affiliation date: 2003
- Regional affiliation: Africa
- Location: Blantyre, Malawi

Official website
- www.facebook.com/cricketmalawi.org/
- (Malawi)

Cricket Malawi, officially the Malawi Cricket Union, is the official governing body of the sport of cricket in Malawi for both the men's and women's national teams as well as the various age-group national cricket teams. Its current headquarters is in Blantyre, Malawi. Malawi Cricket Union is Malawi's representative at the International Cricket Council (ICC) and is an associate member and has been a member of that body since 1998. It is also a member of the African Cricket Association. The association was suspended by the ICC in 2011, before it was lifted in 2014.

Former MCU logo
