= Desert Springs Cricket Ground =

Cricket ground

Coordinates: 37°15′09.7″N 1°49′23.3″W

- Interactive map of Desert Springs Cricket Ground
- Location: Palomares, Cuevas del Almanzora, Almería, Spain
- Country: Spain
- First men's T20I: 8 March 2020: Spain v Germany
- Last men's T20I: 6 November 2022: Spain v Italy
- First women's ODI: 17 October 2023: Ireland v Scotland
- Last women's ODI: 21 October 2023: Ireland v Scotland
- First women's T20I: 11 November 2022: Italy v Norway
- Last women's T20I: 24 October 2023: Ireland v Scotland
- As of 24 October 2023; Source: ESPNcricinfo

The Desert Springs Cricket Ground is a sports ground in Palomares, Cuevas del Almanzora, Almería, Spain. In September 2019, it was selected to host Germany's tour of Spain in March 2020, which included two Twenty20 International (T20I) cricket matches between Spain and Germany. The first international cricket match on the venue was the two teams' first T20I on March 8. The ground has also been used by Derbyshire, Lancashire and Somerset for training ahead of the start of the cricket season in England. In April 2021, the International Cricket Council (ICC) gave accreditation for the stadium to host One Day International (ODI) cricket matches.

== See also ==
- Spain national cricket team
