= Amith Sarma =

German cricketer (born 1982)

Personal information
- Born: 23 October 1982 (age 44)

International information
- National side: Germany
- T20I debut (cap 12): 11 May 2019 v Belgium
- Last T20I: 11 September 2021 v Spain
- Source: Cricinfo, 11 September 2021

Amith Sarma (born 23 October 1982) is a German cricketer, who has played for the national team. He was named in Germany's squad for the 2017 ICC World Cricket League Division Five tournament in South Africa. He played in Germany's opening fixture, against Ghana, on 3 September 2017.

He played a key role in Germany's Division 2 Europe success, helping them secure promotion and winning Division 1 to reach the 2017 Global ICC Qualifier in Benoni, South Africa. He has also captained several times and was also added to the squad for the 2021 ICC T20 Global Qualifiers in Oman where Germany finished 4th place in Group A.

In May 2019, he was named in Germany's Twenty20 International (T20I) squad for their three-match series against Belgium. The matches were the first T20Is to be played by the German cricket team. He made his T20I debut for Germany as Captain against Belgium on 11 May 2019. In June 2019, he was added to Germany's squad for the Regional Finals of the 2018–19 ICC T20 World Cup Europe Qualifier tournament in Guernsey.
