= Dylan Blignaut =

German cricketer (born 1995)

Personal information
- Full name: Dylan Alexander Blignaut
- Born: 8 April 1995 (age 31)
- Batting: Right-handed
- Bowling: Right-arm medium

International information
- National side: Germany
- T20I debut (cap 22): 5 August 2021 v Norway
- Last T20I: 6 November 2022 v Spain
- Source: Cricinfo, 6 November 2022

Dylan Alexander Blignaut (born 8 April 1995) is a South African-born cricketer who plays for the Germany national team. Blignaut represented Eastern Province in under-17s before spending two summers in 2014 and 2015 playing club cricket in England for Vauxhall Mallards in the East Anglian Premier Cricket League and then for Shobrooke Park in the Devon Cricket League. After a successful season with Brighton Districts in Melbourne, Australia, Blignaut was signed by North County Cricket Club to play in the Leinster Senior League in Ireland.

In August 2021, Blignaut was selected in the German squad for a Tri-Nations series. He made his T20I debut on 5 August 2021, for Germany against Norway. In October 2021, he was included in Germany's squad for the 2021 ICC Men's T20 World Cup Europe Qualifier. In the final game of the qualifier, Blignaut took a hat-trick against Italy to help secure Germany a place in the Global Qualifier. In February 2022, Blignaut was again named in Germany's squad for the Global Qualifier.
