= Sweden national cricket team =

National cricket team

Sweden
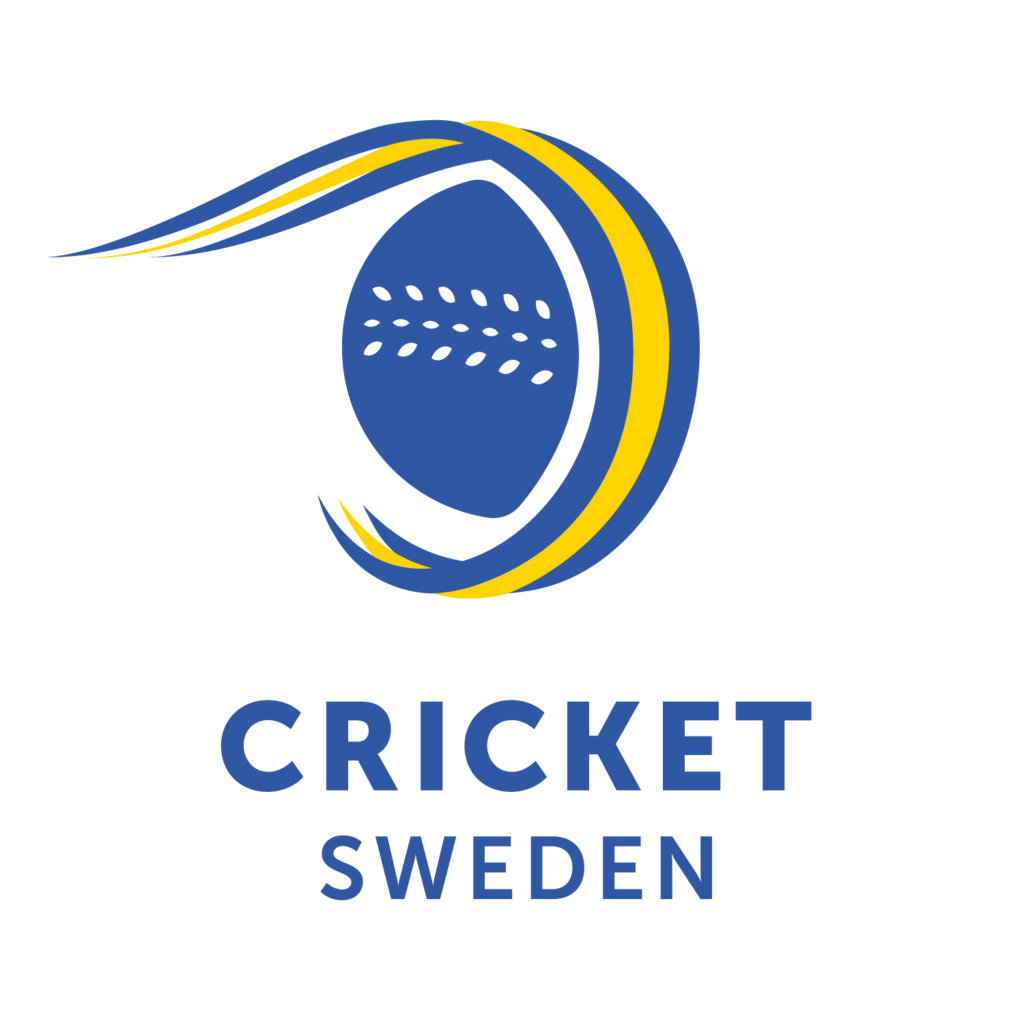
- Association: Swedish Cricket Federation

Personnel
- Captain: Imal Zuwak
- Coach: Dharmender Singh

International Cricket Council
- ICC status: Associate member (2017); Affiliate member (1997)
- ICC region: Europe
ICC Rankings	Current	Best-ever
T20I	44th	37th (2 May 2019)

International cricket
- First international: Sweden v. (Switzerland) (Berlin, Germany; 13 July 1993)

T20 Internationals
- First T20I: v Denmark at Svanholm Park, Brøndby; 14 August 2021
- Last T20I: v Portugal at Botkyrka Cricket Center, Stockholm; 2 July 2026
T20Is	Played	Won/Lost
Total	56	28/26 (2 ties, 0 no results)
This year	20	13/6 (1 tie, 0 no results)
T20I kit
- As of 2 July 2026

The Sweden national cricket team represents Sweden in international cricket. It is organised by the Swedish Cricket Federation, an affiliate member of the International Cricket Council (ICC) since 1997 and an associate member since 2017.

Sweden made its international debut in 1993 at the European Nations Cup. It has since played regularly in the lower divisions of European Cricket Council tournaments and other series against European teams. Sweden first hosted an ICC-approved international cricket tournament in August 2016, when the 2016 ICC Europe Division Two was played in Stockholm.

In April 2018, the ICC granted all its members full Twenty20 International (T20I) status. Therefore, all Twenty20 matches played between Sweden and other ICC members after 1 January 2019 have the full T20I status.

== History ==
The first cricket club in Sweden was formed in Gothenburg in 1883. One of the founders, Erik Blidbert, had learnt the game in London and became a natural leader for Sweden's pioneering Cricket enthusiasts. The club's full name was Lyckans Samfund (Society of Joy), a pun on the name of the local neighbourhood.

The first organised club of modern times, called the Stockholm Cricket Club, was created in 1948 by the staff of the British Embassy in Stockholm. They played against the crews of passing ships and made annual visits to Helsinki. Västerås started in the 1960s and teams from Gothenburg and Mariestad (founded by Ugandan-Indians) followed in the 1970s.

The Swedish Cricket Federation (SCF) was formed in 1990. The driving force behind it was the Guttsta Wicked Cricket Club. The Swedish Cricket Federation became a Member of the ICC in 1991. Over the years, clubs like Stockholms Akademiska Cricketsällskap, set up by students at Stockholm University in 1996 and now one of the largest clubs in the country, have fuelled the growth of Cricket in Sweden. In the initial years, progress was slow, but there was interest. Foreign teams also toured Sweden from time to time to keep things interesting. MCC visited Sweden in June 1999, which was one of the high points for Cricket in the country.

After becoming an affiliate member of the ICC, Sweden participated in many ICC-organised tournaments. In 1997 Sweden successfully hosted its first ever ICC Europe (then ECF) tournament, an indoor tournament in Halmstad.

In 2011, Sweden participated in and won the European Division 3 in Slovenia. The following year, Sweden became runners-up in the European Division 2 championship in Corfu, Greece, which earned the national team a place in the European Division 1, the highest-level tournament Sweden ever played in.

Inspired by the national team's achievements, the national club scene started taking cricket seriously and in 2012, the SCF increased its membership to 21 clubs. The newly formed Division 2 was set up the same year. In 2013, six new clubs joined the league, with the total number of players in the country standing at around 1500. With the ICC development fund, youth cricket also got much attention, with youth camps organised in the three larger cricket regions: Stockholm, Malmö, and Gothenburg. All of this meant further strengthening the club scene and adding to the membership of SCF. In 2014, the SCF applied to become a member of the Swedish Sports Confederation (Riksidrottsförbundet, RF). The RF accepted the application and recognized SCF as its 71st member organisation in May 2015.

2016 was the first year the government funding was available to SCF. This helped build many new cricket facilities in the country and made it possible to host the ICC Europe WCL Division 2 tournament in Stockholm. Sweden finished runners-up in that tournament and again gained promotion to European division 1. In 2015–16, Sweden was one of the largest receivers of refugees in Europe; many of these refugees came from cricket-playing countries. This helped form many new clubs and helped existing clubs gain new members because of the government's integration initiatives. Cricket is growing rapidly in Sweden, and clubs exist in almost every part of the country.

In 2021, Sweden was among five teams excluded from the ICC T20I Championship for failing to play enough fixtures in the relevant period, an effect of the COVID-19 pandemic.

Sweden will make their T20I debut during the tour to Denmark in August 2021.

14 August 2021
10:30
Scorecard

Denmark; 111 (19.5 overs)	v	Sweden; 103/6 (20 overs)
Hamid Shah 25 (21); Hassan Mehmood 5/14 (3.5 overs)		Abhijit Venkatesh 27 (31); Delawar Khan 3/17 (4 overs)

Denmark won by 8 runs
Svanholm Park, Brøndby
Umpires: Allan From (Den) and Jesper Jensen (Den)
Player of the match: Hassan Mehmood (Swe)

- Sweden won the toss and elected to field.
- First T20I match for Sweden.

== Squad ==
- Imal Zuwak (c)
- Share Choudry Ali
- Khalid Ahmad
- Ajay Mundra
- Sadek Sahak
- Darshan Lakhani
- Advait Dhabe
- Saeed Ahmed
- Samiullah Rahmani
- Abdul Nasser Baluch
- Jawid Stanigze
- Boshoff Wayanand
- Zabiulla Zahid
- Abdur Rahman Sudais

== Grounds ==
Location of international cricket matches played in Sweden

== Tournament History ==
- 2011 ICC European T20 Championship Division Three: 1st − Promoted
- 2011 ICC European T20 Championship Division Two: 11th – Remained
- 2012 ICC European T20 Championship Division Two: 2nd – Promoted
- 2013 ICC European T20 Championship Division One: 11th − Relegated
- 2016 ICC Europe Division Two: 2nd − Promoted
- 2017 ICC World Cricket League Europe Region Division One: 2nd −Remained

== Records ==
International Match Summary — Sweden

Last updated 2 July 2026

Playing Record
Format	M	W	L	T	NR	Inaugural Match
Twenty20 Internationals	56	28	26	2	0	14 August 2021

=== Twenty20 International ===
- Highest team total: 218/9 v. Germany on 9 July 2024 at Bayer Uerdingen Cricket Ground, Krefeld.
- Highest individual score: 76*, Ajay Mundra v. Slovenia on 19 May 2026 at Happy Valley Ground 2, Episkopi.
- Best individual bowling figures: 5/14, Hassan Mehmood v. Denmark on 14 August 2021 at Svanholm Park, Brøndby.

T20I record versus other nations

Records complete to T20I #4008. Last updated 2 July 2026.

Opponent	M	W	L	T	NR	First match	First win
Austria	5	2	3	0	0	10 June 2022	22 May 2026
Croatia	1	1	0	0	0	13 July 2022	13 July 2022
Denmark	5	2	3	0	0	14 August 2021	14 August 2021
Finland	10	4	5	1	0	21 August 2021	22 August 2021
France	3	2	1	0	0	7 August 2025	7 August 2025
Germany	3	0	3	0	0	9 June 2022	
Gibraltar	1	1	0	0	0	11 July 2024	11 July 2024
Greece	1	1	0	0	0	18 July 2022	18 July 2022
Guernsey	1	0	1	0	0	16 May 2026	
Hungary	1	1	0	0	0	17 August 2025	17 August 2025
Indonesia	8	7	1	0	0	7 April 2026	7 April 2026
Isle of Man	2	2	0	0	0	6 September 2025	6 September 2025
Italy	1	0	1	0	0	15 July 2022	
Malta	1	0	1	0	0	20 May 2026	
Norway	7	2	5	0	0	18 May 2023	19 May 2023
Portugal	3	0	2	1	0	1 July 2026	
Romania	1	1	0	0	0	19 July 2022	19 July 2022
Slovenia	2	2	0	0	0	13 July 2024	13 July 2024

== See also ==
- List of Sweden Twenty20 International cricketers
- Sweden women's national cricket team
