= Faisal Mubashir =

Pakistani cricketer (born 1986)

Personal information
- Full name: Faisal Bin Mubashir
- Born: 29 September 1986 (age 40); Karachi, Pakistan
- Batting: Right-handed
- Bowling: Right-arm off break
- Role: Bowler

International information
- National side: Germany
- T20I debut (cap 29): 15 October 2021 v Jersey
- Last T20I: 14 August 2023 v Guernsey
- Source: ESPNcricinfo, 24 February 2022

Faisal Bin Mubashir (born 29 September 1986) is a Pakistani cricketer who plays for the Germany cricket team. He played 25 first-class, 10 List A and 16 Twenty20 matches in Pakistan between 2011/12 and 2016/17. In October 2021, Faisal was named in Germany's Twenty20 International (T20I) squad for the Regional Final of the 2021 ICC Men's T20 World Cup Europe Qualifier tournament in Spain. He made his T20I debut on 15 October 2021, for Germany against Jersey, scoring 31*.

In January 2022, he was named in Germany's team for the 2022 ICC Men's T20 World Cup Global Qualifier A tournament in Oman.
