= Sajid Liaqat =

German cricketer (born 1985)

Personal information
- Born: 24 August 1985 (age 41)
- Batting: Right-handed
- Bowling: Right-arm medium
- Role: Bowler

International information
- National side: Germany
- T20I debut (cap 11): 11 May 2019 v Belgium
- Last T20I: 10 June 2022 v Austria
- Source: Cricinfo, 13 June 2022

Sajid Liaqat (born 24 August 1985) is a German cricketer, who plays for the national team. He was named in Germany's squad for the 2017 ICC World Cricket League Division Five tournament in South Africa. He played in Germany's opening fixture, against Ghana, on 3 September 2017. He took the most wickets for Germany in the tournament, with a total of seven dismissals in five matches.

In May 2019, he was named in Germany's Twenty20 International (T20I) squad for their three-match series against Belgium. The matches were the first T20Is to be played by the German cricket team. He made his T20I debut for Germany against Belgium on 11 May 2019.
