= Ahmed Wardak =

German cricketer (born 1988)

Ahmed Hamid Wardak
Personal information
- Born: 13 January 1988 (age 38); Maidan Wardak, Afghanistan
- Batting: Right-handed
- Bowling: Left-arm Medium

International information
- National side: Germany
- T20I debut (cap 2): 11 May 2019 v Belgium
- Last T20I: 9 June 2022 v Sweden
- Source: Cricinfo, 13 June 2022

Ahmed Hamid Wardak (born 13 January 1988) is an Afghan-born German cricketer. He was named in Germany's squad for the 2017 ICC World Cricket League Division Five tournament in South Africa. He played in Germany's opening fixture, against Ghana, on 3 September 2017.

In May 2019, he was named in Germany's Twenty20 International (T20I) squad for their three-match series against Belgium. The matches were the first T20Is to be played by the German cricket team. He made his T20I debut for Germany against Belgium on 11 May 2019. Later the same month, he was named in Germany's squad for the Regional Finals of the 2018–19 ICC T20 World Cup Europe Qualifier tournament in Guernsey.

In September 2021, he was named in Germany's T20I squad for the Regional Final of the 2021 ICC Men's T20 World Cup Europe Qualifier tournament.
