= Sahir Naqash =

German cricketer (born 1990)

Personal information
- Full name: Sahir Naqash
- Born: 12 July 1990 (age 36)
- Batting: Right-handed
- Bowling: Right-arm medium
- Role: All-rounder

International information
- National side: Germany
- T20I debut (cap 10): 11 May 2019 v Belgium
- Last T20I: 14 August 2023 v Guernsey
- Source: Cricinfo, 6 November 2022

Sahir Naqash (born 12 July 1990) is a German cricketer who plays for the national team. In May 2019, he was named in Germany's Twenty20 International (T20I) squad for their three-match series against Belgium. The matches were the first T20Is played by the German cricket team. He made his T20I debut for Germany against Belgium on 11 May 2019. The same month, he was named in Germany's squad for the Regional Finals of the 2018–19 ICC T20 World Cup Europe Qualifier tournament in Guernsey. He played in Germany's match against Denmark on 19 June 2019.

In September 2021, he was named in Germany's T20I squad for the Regional Final of the 2021 ICC Men's T20 World Cup Europe Qualifier tournament.
