= Muslim Yar =

German cricketer

Personal information
- Full name: Muslim Yar Ashraf
- Born: 10 May 1999 (age 27); Afghanistan
- Batting: Right-handed
- Bowling: Left-arm Orthodox

International information
- National side: Germany
- T20I debut (cap 9): 11 May 2019 v Belgium
- Last T20I: 6 November 2022 v Spain
- Source: Cricinfo, 6 November 2022

Muslim Yar (born 10 May 1999) is an Afghan-born German cricketer who plays for the national team. Born in Afghanistan, he arrived in Germany as a refugee in 2016 during the "long summer of migration".

In May 2019, he was named in Germany's Twenty20 International (T20I) squad for their three-match series against Belgium. The matches were the first T20Is to be played by the German cricket team. Muslim Yar made his T20I debut for Germany against Belgium on 11 May 2019. Later the same month, he was named in Germany's squad for the Regional Finals of the 2018–19 ICC T20 World Cup Europe Qualifier tournament in Guernsey. He played in Germany's opening match of the Regional Finals, against Guernsey, on 15 June 2019, where he removed both Guernsey openers in his two-over spell of 2/26.

In September 2021, he was named in Germany's T20I squad for the Regional Final of the 2021 ICC Men's T20 World Cup Europe Qualifier tournament. In January 2022, he was named in Germany's team for the 2022 ICC Men's T20 World Cup Global Qualifier A tournament in Oman.
