= Vijayshankar Chikkannaiah =

German cricketer (born 1987)

Personal information
- Full name: Vijayshankar Bangalore Chikkannaiah
- Born: 16 June 1987 (age 39); Delhi, India
- Batting: Right-handed
- Role: Opening batsman

International information
- National side: Germany
- T20I debut (cap 5): 11 May 2019 v Belgium
- Last T20I: 22 February 2022 v Canada
- Source: Cricinfo, 22 February 2022

Vijayshankar Chikkannaiah (born 16 June 1987) is a German cricketer who plays for the national team. In May 2019, he was named in Germany's Twenty20 International (T20I) squad for their three-match series against Belgium. The matches were the first T20Is to be played by the German cricket team. He made his T20I debut against Belgium on 11 May 2019, managing seven runs. Later the same month, he was named in Germany's squad for the Regional Finals of the 2018–19 ICC T20 World Cup Europe Qualifier tournament in Guernsey. He played in Germany's opening match of the Regional Finals, against Guernsey, on 15 June 2019, scoring 11 runs. However, he was later ruled out of the tournament, after suffering a knee injury in the match against Italy.

In September 2021, he was named in Germany's T20I squad for the Regional Final of the 2021 ICC Men's T20 World Cup Europe Qualifier tournament. In January 2022, he was named in Germany's team for the 2022 ICC Men's T20 World Cup Global Qualifier A tournament in Oman.
