= Venkatraman Ganesan =

German cricketer

Personal information
- Born: 21 May 1985 (age 41); Chennai
- Batting: Left-handed
- Bowling: Right-arm off-break

International information
- National side: Germany
- T20I debut (cap 6): 11 May 2019 v Belgium
- Last T20I: 15 August 2023 v Guernsey
- Source: Cricinfo, 15 August 2023

Venkatraman Ganesan (born 21 May 1985) is an Indian-born German cricketer, who captains the Germany cricket team.

== Biography ==
He was named in Germany's squad for the 2017 ICC World Cricket League Division Five tournament in South Africa. He has represented Tamil Nadu cricket team at age group levels and Tamil Nadu Cricket Association (TNCA) first division. He played an important role in Germany winning its last two games on 2017 ICC World Cricket League Division Five tournament and got Man of the match in both the games he played.

In May 2019, he was named in Germany's Twenty20 International (T20I) squad for their three-match series against Belgium. The matches were the first T20Is to be played by the German cricket team. He made his T20I debut for Germany against Belgium on 11 May 2019. Later the same month, he was named in Germany's squad for the Regional Finals of the 2018–19 ICC T20 World Cup Europe Qualifier tournament in Guernsey. However, he was later ruled out of the tournament, after suffering a broken finger in the match against Italy.

In September 2021, he was named as the captain of Germany's T20I squad for the Regional Final of the 2021 ICC Men's T20 World Cup Europe Qualifier tournament. In January 2022, he was named captain of Germany's team for the 2022 ICC Men's T20 World Cup Global Qualifier A tournament in Oman.
