= Abdul Shakoor (German cricketer) =

German cricketer (born 1999)

Personal information
- Full name: Abdul Shakoor Rahimzei
- Born: 19 March 1999 (age 27)
- Batting: Right-handed
- Bowling: Right-arm off-break
- Role: All-rounder

International information
- National side: Germany
- T20I debut (cap 1): 11 May 2019 v Belgium
- Last T20I: 5 November 2022 v Spain
- Source: ESPNcricinfo, 5 November 2022

Abdul Shakoor Rahimzei (born 19 March 1999) is a German cricketer who plays for the national team. In May 2019, he was named in Germany's Twenty20 International (T20I) squad for their three-match series against Belgium. The matches were the first T20Is to be played by the German cricket team. He made his T20I debut against Belgium on 11 May 2019. The same month, he was named in Germany's squad for the Regional Finals of the 2018–19 ICC T20 World Cup Europe Qualifier tournament in Guernsey. He played in Germany's match against Denmark on 19 June 2019.

In September 2021, he was named in Germany's T20I squad for the Regional Final of the 2021 ICC Men's T20 World Cup Europe Qualifier tournament.
