= List of Germany Twenty20 International cricketers =

This is a list of German Twenty20 International cricketers.

In April 2018, the International Cricket Council (ICC) decided to grant full Twenty20 International (T20I) status to all its members. Therefore, all Twenty20 matches played between Germany and other ICC members after 1 January 2019 have the T20I status.

This list comprises all members of the Germany cricket team who have played at least one T20I match. It is initially arranged in the order in which each player won his first Twenty20 cap. Where more than one player won their first Twenty20 cap in the same match, those players are listed alphabetically by surname. Germany played their first T20I matches in May 2019, as part of a three-match series against Belgium.

== Key ==
General

- ‡ – Captain
- † – Wicket-keeper
- First – Year of debut
- Last – Year of latest game
- Mat – Number of matches played

Batting

- Runs – Runs scored in career
- HS – Highest score
- Avg – Runs scored per dismissal
- * – Batsman remained not out
- 50 – Number of half centuries
- 100 – Number of centuries

Bowling

- Balls – Balls bowled in career
- Wkt – Wickets taken in career
- BBI – Best bowling in an innings
- Ave – Average runs per wicket

Fielding

- Ca – Catches taken
- St – Stumpings affected

== List of players ==
Statistics are correct as of 21 August 2026.

Germany T20I cricketers
General					Batting					Bowling				Fielding		Ref
No.	Name	First	Last	Mat	Runs	HS	Avg	50	100	Balls	Wkt	BBI	Ave	Ca	St	Ref
1	Abdul Shakoor	2019	2023	26	281	59	15.61	1	0	141	8	2/10	19.00	13	0	
2	Ahmed Wardak	2019	2026	19	108	29	18.00	0	0	226	15	4/20	16.80	1	0	
3	Vijayshankar Chikkannaiah	2019	2023	27	575	81*	23.00	4	0	–	–	–	–	4	0	
4	Venkatraman Ganesan‡	2019	2024	47	577	61*	18.61	2	0	552	24	3/11	22.20	24	0	
5	Izatullah Dawlatzai (Note: Izatullah Dawlatzai also played four Twenty20 International matches for Afghanistan. Only his record for Germany is given above.)	2019	2020	12	26	24	26.00	0	0	257	12	3/23	20.66	2	0	
6	Mudassar Muhammad	2019	2023	10	179	34	17.89	0	0	–	–	–	–	3	0	
7	Muslim Yar	2019	2026	63	354	39	16.85	0	0	1,271	78	4/20	17.48	21	0	
8	Sajid Liaqat	2019	2026	26	152	30*	16.88	0	0	492	31	3/24	24.51	5	0	
9	Amith Sarma‡	2019	2021	5	66	28	16.50	0	0	–	–	–	–	2	0	
10	Harmanjot Singh‡	2019	2026	57	1166	83*	28.43	6	0	24	1	1/18	44.00	26	0	
11	Daniel Weston†	2019	2019	6	47	18	7.83	0	0	–	–	–	–	9	2	
12	Amir Mangal	2019	2020	10	142	40	20.28	0	0	40	1	1/17	57.00	3	0	
13	Asad Mohammad	2019	2021	11	12	5	4.00	0	0	174	3	2/23	63.66	5	0	
14	Sahir Naqash	2019	2023	38	368	51*	23.00	1	0	537	43	3/24	15.34	15	0	
15	Talha Khan	2019	2023	28	532	69*	23.13	3	0	1	0	–	–	5	0	
16	Harish Srinivasan†	2019	2025	9	35	15*	11.66	0	0	–	–	–	–	8	4	
17	Rishi Pillai‡	2019	2019	6	28	14	7.00	0	0	–	–	–	–	1	0	
18	Craig Meschede	2019	2019	5	179	67	44.75	1	0	120	6	2/11	19.16	1	0	
19	Michael Richardson‡†	2019	2023	25	511	61*	30.05	2	0	–	–	–	–	15	10	
20	Elam Bharathi	2020	2023	37	7	4*	1.75	0	0	755	46	4/6	14.60	14	0	
21	Dieter Klein	2020	2023	23	123	31*	10.25	0	0	528	28	3/31	19.14	8	0	
22	Dylan Blignaut	2021	2023	29	362	47*	18.10	0	0	274	18	4/18	18.94	6	0	
23	Ghulam Ahmadi	2021	2026	52	61	15*	20.33	0	0	1,129	59	5/23	20.18	11	0	
24	Israr Khan	2021	2021	2	–	–	–	–	–	24	0	–	–	2	0	
25	Nooruddin Mujadady	2021	2026	11	40	16*	13.33	0	0	180	6	2/60	48.83	2	0	
26	Azmat Ali	2021	2021	2	17	17	17.00	0	0	6	0	–	–	0	0	
27	Ahmadschah Ahmadzai	2021	2021	1	–	–	–	–	–	12	2	2/24	12.00	1	0	
28	Husnain Kabeer†	2021	2021	1	5	5	5.00	0	0	–	–	–	–	1	0	
29	Faisal Mubashir	2021	2024	23	428	57*	32.92	1	0	–	–	–	–	7	0	
30	Fayaz Khan	2021	2026	33	460	65*	21.90	3	0	342	22	5/19	20.86	21	0	
31	Justin Broad	2022	2022	9	288	62	41.14	3	0	69	1	1/9	93.00	4	0	
32	Shoaib Khan	2022	2022	6	24	7	6.00	0	0	–	–	–	–	0	0	
33	Abdul Stanikzai	2022	2022	5	71	24	14.20	0	0	–	–	–	–	3	0	
34	Sachin Mandy†	2022	2026	37	282	50*	13.42	2	0	–	–	–	–	26	15	
35	Walter Behr	2022	2022	8	41	22	10.25	0	0	132	11	3/12	11.27	5	0	
36	Vaseekaran Aritharan	2022	2024	4	77	45*	38.50	0	0	–	–	–	–	2	0	
37	Joshua van Heerden	2022	2026	19	591	74	42.21	3	0	146	10	2/9	17.90	11	0	
38	Shahid Afridi	2023	2026	28	402	53	16.08	1	0	359	31	4/12	17.12	7	0	
39	Zahid Zadran	2023	2024	8	12	4*	4.00	0	0	154	7	2/19	31.14	4	0	
40	Abdul Bashir	2023	2025	4	–	–	–	–	–	72	2	1/26	57.00	2	0	
41	Matt Montgomery	2023	2023	1	13	13	13.00	0	0	18	0	–	–	0	0	
42	Ben Kohler-Cadmore	2024	2026	14	43	133*	31.50	2	1	–	–	–	–	8	0	
43	Musaddiq Ahmed‡	2024	2026	25	747	122	29.88	2	2	90	2	1/22	61.50	12	0	
44	Adil Khan	2024	2026	5	17	17	8.50	0	0	84	6	2/18	18.66	0	0	
45	Hassan Khan	2025	2025	6	72	51*	18.00	1	0	–	–	–	–	4	0	
46	Jatinder Kumar	2025	2026	19	23	13	3.83	0	0	414	22	2/11	19.22	12	0	
47	Kyle Klesse†	2025	2026	6	170	51	28.33	1	0	–	–	–	–	2	1	
48	Shahir Malikzai	2026	2026	2	–	–	–	–	–	24	3	2/22	14.00	1	0	
49	Jeevan Bhatt	2026	2026	4	45	24	15.00	0	0	78	7	3/34	15.00	0	0	
50	Ahmad Ullah	2026	2026	6	3	2*	–	0	0	120	10	3/20	13.60	2	0	
51	Christopher Campbell	2026	2026	1	–	–	–	–	–	18	0	–	–	1	0	
52	Joshua Stephan	2026	2026	3	22	12	7.33	0	0	–	–	–	–	2	0	
53	Prateek Dabholkar	2026	2026	5	–	–	–	–	–	90	4	2/10	24.25	1	0	
