= 2018 T20 Inter-Insular Cup =

	Jersey	Guernsey
- Dates: 17 – 18 August 2018
Captains	Josh Butler	Charles Perchard

Twenty20 International series
- Results: Jersey won the 3-match series 3–0
Most runs	Corey Bisson (79)	Ben Ferbrache (85)
Most wickets	Julius Sumerauer (10)	William Peatfield (5)

Jersey cricket team hosted Guernsey cricket team on 17 and 18 August 2018 to contest the inaugural T20 Inter-Insular Cup, a series consisting of three Twenty20 (T20) matches. The series took place at Farmers' Field in Saint Martin. The two sides had played an Inter-Insular match annually since 1950, generally as timed or 50-over contests. For the first time, the 2018 Inter-Insular was played as a three-match Twenty20 series.

The series provided preparation for both teams ahead of the European T20 qualifying tournament for the 2019 ICC Men's T20 World Cup Qualifier; both teams named the same squad for the two events. Despite several senior players being unavailable for selection, Jersey whitewashed Guernsey to win the series 3–0.

Following the International Cricket Council's decision to grant T20I status to all matches played between Associate Members after 1 January 2019, future editions of the Inter-Insular T20 Cup (starting from the 2019 edition) will have this enhanced status. In 2019, the traditional 50-over Inter-Insular Trophy match returned in addition to the Inter-Insular T20 Cup, which would now have a separate trophy awarded.

== T20 series ==
=== Squads ===
Jersey	Guernsey
Charles Perchard (c); Daniel Birrell; Corey Bisson; Dominic Blampied; Harrison Carlyon; Jake Dunford (wk); Jonty Jenner; Ben Kynman; Elliot Miles; Rhys Palmer; William Robertson; Ben Stevens; Julius Sumerauer; Ben Ward	Josh Butler (c); David Hooper (vc); Lucas Barker; Isaac Damarell (wk); Max Ellis; Ben Ferbrache; Luke Le Tissier; Jordan Martel; Oliver Newey; Tom Nightingale; William Peatfield; Anthony Stokes; Matthew Stokes; Thomas Veillard

=== 1st T20 ===
17 August 2018
Scorecard

Jersey; 122/7 (20 overs)	v	Guernsey; 108/9 (20 overs)
Dominic Blampied 33 (25); William Peatfield 2/23 (4 overs)		Ben Ferbrache 41* (48); Julius Sumerauer 3/25 (4 overs)

Jersey won by 14 runs
Farmers' Field, Saint Martin
Umpires: John Edmonds (Jer) and Mike Kinder (Gue)
Player of the match: Julius Sumerauer (Jer)

- Guernsey won the toss and elected to field.

=== 2nd T20 ===
18 August 2018
Scorecard

Jersey; 128/8 (20 overs)	v	Guernsey; 122/9 (20 overs)
Jonty Jenner 46 (50); William Peatfield 3/36 (4 overs)		Ben Ferbrache 40 (38); Elliot Miles 4/14 (4 overs)

Jersey won by 6 runs
Farmers' Field, Saint Martin
Umpires: Heath Kearns (Jer) and Mark Savage (Gue)
Player of the match: Jonty Jenner (Jer)

- Guernsey won the toss and elected to field.

=== 3rd T20 ===
18 August 2018
Scorecard

Guernsey; 110 (20 overs)	v	Jersey; 111/2 (17.4 overs)
Matthew Stokes 33 (29); Charles Perchard 3/17 (4 overs)		Corey Bisson 43* (29); Luke Le Tissier 1/33 (4 overs)

Jersey won by 8 wickets
Farmers' Field, Saint Martin
Umpires: John Edmonds (Jer) and Mike Kinder (Gue)
Player of the match: Corey Bisson (Jer)

- Guernsey won the toss and elected to bat.

== See also ==
- Inter-Insular cricket
- 2019 T20 Inter-Insular Cup
