= 2023 Men's T20I Inter-Insular Series =

International cricket tour

2023 Men's T20I Inter-Insular Cup
	Jersey	Guernsey
- Dates: 7 – 8 July 2023
Captains	Charles Perchard	Josh Butler (Note: Matthew Stokes captained Guernsey for the 2nd T20I.)

Twenty20 International series
- Results: Jersey won the 3-match series 2–0
Most runs	Harrison Carlyon (89)	Ben Fitchet (63)
Most wickets	Elliot Miles (4); Charles Perchard (4)	Dane Mullen (3); Luke Bichard (3)

The 2023 Men's T20I Inter-Insular Series, consisting of three Twenty20 International (T20I) matches, took place at the Farmers Cricket Club Ground in St Martin in July 2023. This was the fourth Twenty20 Inter-Insular series, and the third to be played with official T20I status. Jersey were the defending champions, having won the 2022 series 3–0.

Jersey and Guernsey have played an Inter-Insular cricket match annually since 1950, generally as 50-over contests. A Twenty20 series was played for the first time in 2018. Since the 2019 T20 Inter-Insular Cup the T20 series has had official T20I status, following the International Cricket Council's decision to grant T20I status to all matches played between Associate Members after 1 January 2019.

Jersey won the first match by seven wickets, helped by a century opening partnership between Charlie Brennan and Harrison Carlyon. Jersey sealed the series by winning the second match by four wickets, before the third game was abandoned due to a heavy downpour.

Immediately after the series, Guernsey captain Josh Butler switched his focus to managing the island's table tennis team at the 2023 Island Games.

== Squads ==
Jersey	Guernsey
Charles Perchard (c); Dominic Blampied; Charlie Brennan; Toby Britton; Harrison Carlyon; Patrick Gouge (wk); Jonty Jenner; Josh Lawrenson; Elliot Miles; Rhys Palmer; William Perchard; Julius Sumerauer; Asa Tribe (wk); Zak Tribe; Benjamin Ward	Josh Butler (c); Luke Bichard; Martin-Dale Bradley; Isaac Damarell (wk); Ben Ferbrache; Ben Fitchet; David Hooper; Thomas Kirk; Luke Le Tissier; Adam Martel; Dane Mullen; Oliver Nightingale; Tom Nightingale; Matthew Stokes

== T20I series ==
=== 1st T20I ===
7 July 2023
17:00
Scorecard

Guernsey; 134/6 (20 overs)	v	Jersey; 135/3 (15.2 overs)
Oliver Nightingale 29* (24); Benjamin Ward 2/19 (4 overs)		Charlie Brennan 67* (46); Luke Bichard 2/33 (4 overs)

Jersey won by 7 wickets
Farmers Cricket Club Ground, St Martin
Umpires: Heath Kearns (Jer) and Robin Stockton (Jer)
Player of the match: Charlie Brennan (Jer)

- Guernsey won the toss and elected to bat.
- Josh Lawrenson (Jer), Martin-Dale Bradley, Ben Fitchet and Dane Mullen (Gue) all made their T20I debuts.

=== 2nd T20I ===
8 July 2023
11:00
Scorecard

Guernsey; 151/9 (20 overs)	v	Jersey; 152/6 (19 overs)
Ben Fitchet 37 (20); Charles Perchard 3/31 (4 overs)		Harrison Carlyon 41* (30); Dane Mullen 3/26 (4 overs)

Jersey won by 4 wickets
Farmers Cricket Club Ground, St Martin
Umpires: Heath Kearns (Jer) and Richard Veillard (Gue)

- Jersey won the toss and elected to field.
- Thomas Kirk (Gue) made his T20I debut.

=== 3rd T20I ===
8 July 2023
15:00
Scorecard

Jersey	v	Guernsey

Match abandoned
Farmers Cricket Club Ground, St Martin

- No toss
- No play was possible due to rain.

== 50-over match ==
2 September 2023
11:00
Scorecard

Jersey; 316/4 (50 overs)	v	Guernsey; 143 (29.5 overs)
Jonty Jenner 116* (94); Matthew Stokes 2/39 (10 overs)		Matthew Stokes 31 (29); Ben Stevens 3/19 (4.5 overs)

Jersey won by 173 runs
King George V Sports Ground, Castel
Umpires: Heath Kearns (Jer) and Mike Kinder (Gue)

- Guernsey won toss and elected to field.

== See also ==
- Inter-Insular cricket
