= 2022 Men's T20I Inter-Insular Series =

International cricket tour

2022 T20I Inter-Insular Cup
	Guernsey	Jersey
- Dates: 20 – 21 May 2022
Captains	Josh Butler	Charles Perchard

Twenty20 International series
- Results: Jersey won the 3-match series 3–0
Most runs	Matthew Stokes (100)	Asa Tribe (119)
Most wickets	Anthony Stokes (6)	Charles Perchard (7)

The 2022 Men's T20I Inter-Insular Series, consisting of three Twenty20 International (T20I) matches, was held in Guernsey from 20 to 21 May 2022. The first match was played at College Field in Saint Peter Port, and the remaining matches at King George V Sports Ground in Castel.

Jersey and Guernsey have played an Inter-Insular cricket match annually since 1950, generally as 50-over contests. A Twenty20 series was played for the first time in 2018, and the 2019 T20 Inter-Insular Cup had official T20I status for the first time, following the International Cricket Council's decision to grant T20I status to all matches played between Associate Members after 1 January 2019. Jersey were the defending champions of the T20I Inter-Insular series, having won the 2019 series 3–0. There were no Inter-Insular matches in 2020 or 2021 due to the COVID-19 pandemic. Prior to this series, Jersey were on a ten-game winning streak against Guernsey across all formats.

Jersey claimed another 3–0 series win to retain the T20 trophy. Jersey won the first match by 37 runs, the second match by 60 runs, and the third match again by 37 runs. All-rounder Harrison Carlyon put in man-of-the-match performances in the first two games to play a major part in securing the series for Jersey. After Guernsey had taken two early wickets in the final game of the series, Jersey's Asa Tribe scored 65 runs from 32 balls to lead his side to their highest total in an official T20I.

The teams also contested the 50-over Inter-Insular Trophy match in Jersey in September 2022, and a women's T20I series was played in June 2022.

== T20I series ==
=== Squads ===
Guernsey	Jersey
Josh Butler (c); Luke Bichard; Isaac Damarell (wk); Ben Ferbrache; David Hooper; Benjamin Johnson; Luke Le Tissier; Declan Martel; Oliver Newey (wk); Oliver Nightingale; Tom Nightingale; William Peatfield; Anthony Stokes; Matthew Stokes	Charles Perchard (c); Daniel Birrell; Dominic Blampied; Charlie Brennan; Harrison Carlyon; Jake Dunford (wk); Nick Greenwood; Jonty Jenner; Elliot Miles; Rhys Palmer; Julius Sumerauer; Asa Tribe

=== 1st T20I ===
20 May 2022
16:00
Scorecard

Jersey; 178/4 (20 overs)	v	Guernsey; 141/7 (20 overs)
Julius Sumerauer 54* (32); Anthony Stokes 3/18 (4 overs)		Matthew Stokes 48 (27); Harrison Carlyon 3/14 (4 overs)

Jersey won by 37 runs
College Field, Saint Peter Port
Umpires: Heath Kearns (Jer) and Jeremy Sharratt (Gue)
Player of the match: Harrison Carlyon (Jer)

- Guernsey won the toss and elected to field.
- Benjamin Johnson (Gue) made his T20I debut.

=== 2nd T20I ===
21 May 2022
10:45
Scorecard

Jersey; 168/6 (20 overs)	v	Guernsey; 108/8 (20 overs)
Harrison Carlyon 56 (38); William Peatfield 4/22 (4 overs)		Josh Butler 24 (36); Charles Perchard 3/17 (4 overs)

Jersey won by 60 runs
King George V Sports Ground, Castel
Umpires: Heath Kearns (Jer) and Mike Savage (Gue)
Player of the match: Harrison Carlyon (Jer)

- Guernsey won the toss and elected to field.

=== 3rd T20I ===
21 May 2022
15:15
Scorecard

Jersey; 185/7 (20 overs)	v	Guernsey; 148/4 (20 overs)
Asa Tribe 65 (32); Luke Le Tissier 3/23 (3 overs)		Isaac Damarell 46 (31); Charles Perchard 2/27 (4 overs)

Jersey won by 37 runs
King George V Sports Ground, Castel
Umpires: Heath Kearns (Jer) and Richard Veillard (Gue)
Player of the match: Asa Tribe (Jer)

- Jersey won the toss and elected to bat.

== 50-over match ==
The 50-over Inter-Insular Trophy match was played on 3 September 2022. The match was played at Jersey's Farmers Cricket Club Ground in St Martin. This was the 68th annual Inter-Insular Trophy match between the two sides. Jersey won the match by two-wickets to retain the Inter-Insular Trophy, despite a batting collapse causing a scare when chasing Guernsey's low target of 106.

=== Squads ===
Jersey	Guernsey
Charles Perchard (c); Dominic Blampied; Charlie Brennan; Harrison Carlyon; Jake Dunford (wk); Nick Greenwood; Jonty Jenner; Josh Lawrenson; Elliot Miles; Rhys Palmer; George Richardson; Julius Sumerauer; Asa Tribe	Josh Butler (c); Luke Bichard; Martin-Dale Bradley; Isaac Damarell (wk); Ben Ferbrache; David Hooper; Luke Le Tissier; Adam Martel; William Peatfield; Oliver Nightingale; Tom Nightingale; Anthony Stokes

=== Only 50-over match ===
3 September 2022
10:30
Scorecard

Guernsey; 106 (36.4 overs)	v	Jersey; 107/8 (28.3 overs)
William Peatfield 27 (56); Asa Tribe 3/23 (10 overs)		Jonty Jenner 18 (23); Luke Bichard 2/26 (9 overs)

Jersey won by 2 wickets
Farmers Cricket Club Ground, St Martin
Umpires: Carl Brooks (Gue) and Heath Kearns (Jer)

- Guernsey won the toss and elected to bat.

== See also ==
- Inter-Insular cricket
- 2019 T20 Inter-Insular Cup
