= 2025 T20I Inter-Insular Series =

International cricket tour

The 2025 Men's T20I Inter-Insular Series, consisting of three Twenty20 International (T20I) matches, took place at the Grainville Cricket Ground, Saint Saviour, Jersey, in June 2025. This was the sixth men's Twenty20 Inter-Insular series, and the fifth to be played with official T20I status. Jersey were the defending champions, having won the 2024 series 2–1.

Jersey and Guernsey had played an Inter-Insular cricket match annually since 1950, generally as 50-over contests. A Twenty20 series was played for the first time in 2018. The T20 series has had official T20I status since the 2019 T20 Inter-Insular Cup, following the International Cricket Council's decision to grant T20I status to all matches played between Associate Members after 1 January 2019.

Guernsey's preparations included a win against a Marylebone Cricket Club team in Saint Peter Port before travelling to Jersey.

After the first two matches (which were both rain-affected and determined using the DLS method) were split, Jersey won the decider by three runs to retain the trophy 2–1.

A women's match was played on 5 July at the King George V Sports Ground in Castel. Jersey won the rain-shortened contest by 89 runs under the DLS method.

On 9 August 2025, the men's teams also contested the 71st annual Inter-Insular Trophy 50-over match at King George V Sports Ground. Jersey won by eight wickets to retain the trophy.

== Men's series ==
2025 Men's T20I Inter-Insular Cup
	Jersey	Guernsey
- Dates: 6 – 7 June 2025
Captains	Charles Perchard	Oliver Nightingale

Twenty20 International series
- Results: Jersey won the 3-match series 2–1
Most runs	Nick Greenwood (71)	Matthew Stokes (86)
Most wickets	Charles Perchard (8)	Martin-Dale Bradley (6)

=== Squads ===
Jersey	Guernsey
Charles Perchard (c); Daniel Birrell; Charlie Brennan; Harrison Carlyon; Patrick Gouge (wk); Nick Greenwood; Jonty Jenner; Stanley Norman; William Perchard; Theo Pullman; Julius Sumerauer; Zak Tribe; Scott van Breda	Oliver Nightingale (c); Luke Bichard; Charles Birch; Martin-Dale Bradley; Josh Butler; Isaac Damarell (wk); Ben Ferbrache; Ben Fitchet; Harry Johnson; Adam Martel; Tom Nightingale; Charlie Simmonds (wk); Anthony Stokes; Matthew Stokes

Jersey included former Jersey Reds and Worcester Rugby player Scott van Breda in their squad.

=== T20I series ===
==== 1st T20I ====
6 June 2025
16:00
Scorecard

Jersey; 116/8 (20 overs)	v	Guernsey; 65/2 (10 overs)
Zak Tribe 28 (26); Martin-Dale Bradley 4/17 (4 overs)		Josh Butler 33* (30); Nick Greenwood 1/13 (2 overs)

Guernsey won by 13 runs (DLS method)
Grainville Cricket Ground, Saint Saviour
Umpires: Robin Stockton (Jer) and Richard Veillard (Gue)

- Guernsey won the toss and elected to field.
- No further play was possible due to rain.
- Stanley Norman, Scott van Breda (Jer), Charles Birch and Charlie Simmonds (Gue) all made their T20I debuts.
- This was the first men's T20I to be played at the venue.

==== 2nd T20I ====
7 June 2025
13:00
Scorecard

Guernsey; 107/7 (13 overs)	v	Jersey; 116/3 (12.1 overs)
Ben Fitchet 37 (22); Charles Perchard 4/15 (3 overs)		Nick Greenwood 45 (25); Martin-Dale Bradley 1/15 (3 overs)

Jersey won by 7 wickets (DLS method)
Grainville Cricket Ground, Saint Saviour
Umpires: George Thomas (Jer) and Richard Veillard (Gue)
Player of the match: Nick Greenwood (Jer)

- Jersey won the toss and elected to field.
- Jersey were set a revised target of 114 runs in 13 overs due to rain.

==== 3rd T20I ====
7 June 2025
17:00
Scorecard

Jersey; 130/8 (20 overs)	v	Guernsey; 127/8 (20 overs)
Julius Sumerauer 34 (21); Anthony Stokes 3/9 (3 overs)		Matthew Stokes 66* (45); Charles Perchard 3/15 (4 overs)

Jersey won by 3 runs
Grainville Cricket Ground, Saint Saviour
Umpires: George Thomas (Jer) and Richard Veillard (Gue)
Player of the match: Charles Perchard (Jer)

- Jersey won the toss and elected to bat.
- Theo Pullman (Jer) made his T20I debut.

== Women's series ==
2025 Women's Inter-Insular Cup
	Guernsey	Jersey
- Date: 5 July 2025
Captains	Krista De La Mare	Chloe Greechan

Twenty20 International series
- Results: Jersey won the 1-match series 1–0
Most runs	Philippa Stahelin (16)	Grace Wetherall (68)
Most wickets	Molly Robinson (2); Claire Jennings (2)	Chloe Greechan (2)

=== Squads ===
Guernsey	Jersey
Krista De La Mare (c, wk); Hana Atkinson; Eva Bourgaize; Claire Elmore; Rosie Home; Claire Jennings; Annie Le Ray; Marianne Le Ray; Rachel Merrien; Olivia Morgan; Molly Robinson; Philippa Stahelin; Mollie Watson; Amelia Wheatcroft	Chloe Greechan (c); Olivia Bastin; Maria Da Rocha; Kate Follain; Erin Gouge; Georgia Mallet (wk); Analise Merritt; Annabel Mossop; Daisy Pearce; Trinity Smith; Tallulah Spry; Grace Wetherall

=== Practice match ===
5 July 2025
09:00

Guernsey; 76 (16 overs)	v	Jersey; 78/1 (8.5 overs)
Rosie Home 12 (22); Kate Follain 3/7 (2 overs)		Maria Da Rocha 20* (26); Rosie Home 1/17 (2 overs)

Jersey won by 9 wickets
King George V Sports Ground, Castel
Umpires: Robin Stockton (Jer) and Richard Veillard (Gue)

=== Only T20I ===
5 July 2025
13:00
Scorecard

Jersey; 200/4 (20 overs)	v	Guernsey; 45/5 (12 overs)
Grace Wetherall 68 (48); Molly Robinson 2/28 (3 overs)		Philippa Stahelin 16 (42); Chloe Greechan 2/6 (3 overs)

Jersey won by 90 runs (DLS method)
King George V Sports Ground, Castel
Umpires: Mark Savage (Gue) and Robin Stockton (Jer)
Player of the match: Grace Wetherall (Jer)

- Guernsey won the toss and elected to field.
- Guernsey were set a revised target of 135 runs in 12 overs due to rain.
- Rosie Home (Gue) made her T20I debut.

== Inter-Insular Trophy ==
The 50-over Inter-Insular Trophy match was played on 9 August 2025 at King George V Sports Ground in Castel, Guernsey. This was the 71st annual Inter-Insular Trophy match between the two sides. Jersey won by eight wickets.

=== Squads ===
Guernsey	Jersey
Oliver Nightingale (c); Lucas Barker (wk); Luke Bichard; Martin-Dale Bradley; Ben Ferbrache; Ben Fitchet; Charlie Forshaw; Adam Martel; Tom Nightingale; Anthony Stokes; Matthew Stokes	Charles Perchard (c); Charlie Brennan; Harrison Carlyon; Jake Dunford (wk); Ed Giles; Patrick Gouge; Nick Greenwood; Josh Lawrenson; Will Perchard; Theo Pullman; George Richardson; Julius Sumerauer; Asa Tribe; Zak Tribe

=== Only 50-over match ===
9 August 2025
10:30
Scorecard

Guernsey; 150 (43 overs)	v	Jersey; 152/2 (25.2 overs)
Luke Bichard 29; George Richardson 5/38 (10 overs)		Harrison Carlyon 85; Adam Martel 1/21 (3 overs)

Jersey won by 8 wickets
King George V Sports Ground, Castel
Umpires: Carl Brooks (Gue) and Suthan Selvachandran (Jer)
Player of the match: George Richardson (Jer)

- Guernsey won the toss and elected to bat.

== See also ==
- Inter-Insular cricket
