= 2024 T20I Inter-Insular Series =

International cricket tour

The 2024 T20I Inter-Insular Series were two separate bilateral cricket series for men and women featuring the senior national teams of Jersey and Guernsey. The men's series consisted of three Twenty20 International (T20I) matches and was held in Guernsey in June 2024. The first two matches were played at King George V Sports Ground in Castel, and the final game was played at the Guernsey Rovers Athletic Club Ground in Port Soif. The women's series consisted of a single women's T20I, which has held at the Grainville Cricket Ground in Jersey.

Jersey and Guernsey have played an Inter-Insular cricket match annually since 1950, generally as 50-over contests. A Twenty20 series was played for the first time in 2018, and the 2019 T20 Inter-Insular Cup had official T20I status for the first time, following the International Cricket Council's decision to grant T20I status to all matches played between Associate Members after 1 January 2019. Jersey were defending T20 champions, having won the 2023 series 2–0.

The men's series was played on artificial surfaces to aid the preparations of both sides ahead of their respective European Qualifier events later in the summer. Jersey retained the series by winning both matches on 22 June, before Guernsey picked up a consolation victory in the third match. Guernsey's victory was their first win against their neighbours in the format, and their first success over them in any format since 2015.

In the women's match, hosts Jersey defeated Guernsey by 104 runs.

In September 2024, the men's teams also contested the 70th annual Inter-Insular Trophy 50-over match at Grainville Cricket Ground. Jersey retained the trophy with a tense two-wicket victory.

== Men's T20I series ==
2024 Men's T20I Inter-Insular Series
	Guernsey	Jersey
- Dates: 22 – 23 June 2024
Captains	Ollie Nightingale	Charles Perchard (Note: Jonty Jenner captained Jersey in the third T20I.)

Twenty20 International series
- Results: Jersey won the 3-match series 2–1
Most runs	Tom Nightingale (67)	Jonty Jenner (141)
Most wickets	Charlie Forshaw (4)	Charles Perchard (6)

=== Squads ===
Guernsey	Jersey
Oliver Nightingale (c); Charlie Birch; Luke Bichard; Martin-Dale Bradley; Oliver Clapham; Isaac Damarell (wk); Ben Ferbrache; Ben Fitchet; Charlie Forshaw; Harry Johnson; Adam Martel; Dane Mullen; Tom Nightingale; Matthew Stokes	Charles Perchard (c); Daniel Birrell; Dominic Blampied; Charlie Brennan; Toby Britton; Harrison Carlyon; Nick Greenwood; Jonty Jenner; Jack Kemp (wk); Josh Lawrenson; Scott Simpson; Julius Sumerauer; Zak Tribe; Benjamin Ward

=== 1st T20I ===
22 June 2024
11:00
Scorecard

Guernsey; 156/6 (20 overs)	v	Jersey; 157/3 (18.1 overs)
Isaac Damarell 40 (33); Charles Perchard 3/33 (4 overs)		Nick Greenwood 85 (50); Matthew Stokes 2/24 (4 overs)

Jersey won by 7 wickets
King George V Sports Ground, Castel
Umpires: Richard Veillard (Gue) and Johannes Vosser (Jer)
Player of the match: Nick Greenwood (Jer)

- Jersey won the toss and elected to field.
- Charlie Forshaw (Gue) made his T20I debut.

=== 2nd T20I ===
22 June 2024
14:00
Scorecard

Guernsey; 134 (19.4 overs)	v	Jersey; 137/2 (11.3 overs)
Ben Ferbrache 34 (27); Charles Perchard 3/17 (3.4 overs)		Jonty Jenner 80* (31); Matthew Stokes 1/26 (2 overs)

Jersey won by 8 wickets
King George V Sports Ground, Castel
Umpires: Martin Tolcher (Gue) and Johannes Vosser (Jer)
Player of the match: Jonty Jenner (Jer)

- Jersey won the toss and elected to field.

=== 3rd T20I ===
23 June 2024
12:00
Scorecard

Jersey; 148/8 (20 overs)	v	Guernsey; 149/6 (19.1 overs)
Zak Tribe 43* (27); Charlie Forshaw 3/17 (3 overs)		Tom Nightingale 61 (36); Toby Britton 2/21 (4 overs)

Guernsey won by 4 wickets
Guernsey Rovers Athletic Club Ground, Port Soif
Umpires: Mike Kinder (Gue) and Johannes Vosser (Jer)
Player of the match: Tom Nightingale (Gue)

- Guernsey won the toss and elected to field.
- Toby Britton (Jer) made his T20I debut.

== Women's T20I match ==
2024 Women's T20I Inter-Insular Series
	Jersey	Guernsey
- Date: 15 July 2024
Captains	Chloe Greechan	Krista De La Mare

Twenty20 International series
- Results: Jersey won the 1-match series 1–0
Most runs	Charlie Miles (68)	Hannah Mechem (11)
Most wickets	Sophia Hanson (3); Florrie Copley (3)	Molly Robinson (4)

=== Squads ===
Jersey	Guernsey
Chloe Greechan (c); Aimee Aikenhead; Effie Bowley; Florrie Copley; Maria Da Rocha; Erin Duffy; Erin Gouge; Lily Greig; Mia Maguire (wk); Analise Merritt; Charlie Miles (wk); Trinity Smith; Florence Tanguy; Grace Wetherall	Krista De La Mare (c); Eva Bourgaize; Francesca Bulpitt (wk); Alice Davis; Rosie Davis; Rebecca Hubbard; Claire Jennings; Hannah Mechem; Emily Merrien; Rachel Merrien; Elise Millington; Molly Robinson; Philippa Stahelin; Fiona Trabold

=== Only T20I ===
14 July 2024
13:00
Scorecard

Jersey; 157 (19 overs)	v	Guernsey; 53 (19.3 overs)
Charlie Miles 68 (42); Molly Robinson 4/15 (4 overs)		Hannah Mechem 11 (22); Sophia Hanson 3/7 (3 overs)

Jersey won by 104 runs
Grainville Cricket Ground, St Saviour
Umpires: Carl Brooks (Gue) and Stuart Hodgson (Jer)
Player of the match: Charlie Miles (Jer)

- Guernsey won the toss and elected to field.

== Inter-Insular Trophy ==
The 50-over Inter-Insular Trophy match was played on 7 September 2024 at Grainville Cricket Ground in Saint Saviour, Jersey. This was the 70th annual Inter-Insular Trophy match between the two sides. In a contest reduced to 42 overs per side due to travel issues and rain, Jersey won by two wickets with one ball to spare.

=== Squads ===
Jersey	Guernsey
Charles Perchard (c); Dominic Blampied; Charlie Brennan; Toby Britton; Harrison Carlyon; Jake Dunford (wk); Patrick Gouge; Josh Lawrenson; Scott Simpson; Julius Sumerauer; Zak Tribe; Stanley Norman	Oliver Nightingale (c); Luke Bichard; Josh Butler; Isaac Damarell (wk); Ben Ferbrache; Ben Fitchet; Charlie Forshaw; Harry Johnson; Adam Martel; Dane Mullen; Tom Nightingale; Edward Robinson; Matthew Stokes

7 September 2024
10:45
Scorecard

Guernsey; 204/7 (42 overs)	v	Jersey; 207/8 (41.5 overs)
Matthew Stokes 85 (95); Charles Perchard 4/45 (9 overs)		Harrison Carlyon 73 (100); Dane Mullen 3/50 (8 overs)

Jersey won by 2 wickets
Grainville Cricket Ground, Jersey
Umpires: Heath Kearns (Jer) and Mark Savage (Gue)
Player of the match: Harrison Carlyon

- Jersey won the toss and elected to field.
- Match reduced to 42 overs per side due travel issues and rain

== See also ==
- Inter-Insular cricket
