= 2026 Scotland Tri-Nation Series =

21st tri-nation series round in 2024-26 WCL2

- Part of 2024–2026 Cricket World Cup League 2
- Round 21
- Date: 3 – 13 August 2026
- Location: Scotland
Teams
Canada	Scotland	United Arab Emirates
Captains
Saad Bin Zafar	Richie Berrington	Harpreet Singh
Most runs
Yuvraj Samra (98)	Richie Berrington (188)	Adeeb Usmani (128)
Most wickets
Zahid Shirzad (9)	Lyle Robertson (6)	Muhammad Jawadullah (6)

The 2026 Scotland Tri-Nation Series was the 21st round of the 2024–2026 Cricket World Cup League 2 cricket tournament that took place in Scotland in August 2026. It was a tri-nation series contested by the men's national teams of Canada, Scotland and the United Arab Emirates. The matches were played as One Day International (ODI) fixtures.

== United Arab Emirates in Jersey ==
Prior to the start of the League 2 series, United Arab Emirates cricket team toured Jersey for two 50-over one day matches against the Jersey cricket team on 27 and 29 July 2026.

UAE men's cricket team in Jersey in 2026
	Jersey	United Arab Emirates
- Dates: 27 – 29 July 2026
Captains	Charles Perchard	Harpreet Singh

LA series
- Result: United Arab Emirates won the 2-match series 2–0
Most runs	Nick Greenwood (111)	Aryansh Sharma (217)
Most wickets	Julius Sumerauer (4)	Aayan Afzal Khan (3)

=== Squads ===
Jersey	United Arab Emirates
Charles Perchard (c); Daniel Birrell; Dominic Blampied; Charlie Brennan; Toby Britton; Harrison Carlyon; Jake Dunford (wk); Patrick Gouge; Nick Greenwood; Jonty Jenner; Stanley Norman; William Perchard; George Richardson; Julius Sumerauer; Zak Tribe; Scott van Breda; Benjamin Ward	Harpreet Singh (c); Muhammad Arfan; Rahul Chopra; Muhammad Jawadullah; Aayan Afzal Khan; Sohaib Khan; Muhammad Mohsin; Akshdeep Nath; Dhruv Parashar; Muhammad Shahdad; Aryansh Sharma (wk); Junaid Siddique; Simranjeet Singh; Tanish Suri (wk); Adeeb Usmani (wk)

=== Fixtures ===
Match 1
27 July 2026
11:00
Scorecard

Jersey; 315/5 (50 overs)	v	United Arab Emirates; 316/3 (48 overs)
Nick Greenwood 102 (92); Dhruv Parashar 1/30 (5 overs)		Aryansh Sharma 131* (133); Dominic Blampied 1/17 (3 overs)

United Arab Emirates won by 7 wickets
NCC Grainville, St Saviour

- United Arab Emirates won the toss and elected to field.

Match 2
29 July 2026
11:00
Scorecard

United Arab Emirates; 276/6 (50 overs)	v	Jersey; 179 (38.5 overs)
Aryansh Sharma 86* (108); Julius Sumerauer 3/49 (10 overs)		Stanley Norman 40 (79); Aayan Afzal Khan 2/3 (2 overs)

United Arab Emirates won by 97 runs
NCC Grainville, St Saviour

- Jersey won the toss and elected to field.

== Warm-up matches ==
Before the start of the League 2 series, United Arab Emirates and Canada played warm up matches against Scotland A.

Scotland A Warm-up matches

Warm-up match 1
28 July 2026
11:00
Scorecard

Scotland A	v	Canada

Match abandoned
Forthill, Dundee

- No toss.
- No play was possible due to rain.

Warm-up match 2
30 July 2026
11:00
Scorecard

Canada; 323/6 (50 overs)	v	Scotland A 232 (48 overs)
Matthew Spoors 129 (107); Ollie Jones 3/54 (8 overs)		Michael Jones 67 (78); Manu Saraswat 4/45 (9 overs)

Canada won by 91 runs
Forthill, Dundee

- Canada won the toss and elected to bat.

Warm-up match 3
31 July 2026
11:00
Scorecard

United Arab Emirates; 266 (49.4 overs)	v	Scotland A 259 (49.1 overs)
Adeeb Usmani 66 (77); Cameron Brown 2/28 (5.4 overs)		Jamie Dunk 64 (71); Simranjeet Singh 3/41 (10 overs)

United Arab Emirates won by 7 runs
Lochlands Park, Arbroath

- United Arab Emirates won the toss and elected to bat.

== League 2 series ==
=== Squads ===
Canada	Scotland	United Arab Emirates
Saad Bin Zafar (c); Anoop Chima; Aaron Johnson; Ali Khan; Nicholas Kirton; Shreyas Movva (wk); Ansh Patel; Meet Patel; Yuvraj Samra; Kaleem Sana; Shivam Sharma; Zahid Shirzad; Pargat Singh; Matthew Spoors; Harsh Thaker	Richie Berrington (c); Matthew Cross (wk); Jasper Davidson; Oliver Davidson; Michael English; Zainullah Ihsan; Jack Jarvis; Michael Jones; Ollie Jones; Finlay McCreath; Brandon McMullen; George Munsey; Lyle Robertson; Safyaan Sharif; Mark Watt	Harpreet Singh (c); Muhammad Arfan; Rahul Chopra; Muhammad Jawadullah; Aayan Afzal Khan; Sohaib Khan; Muhammad Mohsin; Akshdeep Nath; Dhruv Parashar; Muhammad Shahdad; Aryansh Sharma (wk); Junaid Siddique; Simranjeet Singh; Tanish Suri (wk); Adeeb Usmani (wk)

=== Fixtures ===
==== 1st ODI ====
3 August 2026
11:00
Scorecard

Scotland	v	United Arab Emirates

Match abandoned
Forthill, Dundee
Umpires: David McLean (Sco) and Gazi Sohel (Ban)

- No toss.
- No play was possible due to rain.

==== 2nd ODI ====
5 August 2026
11:00
Scorecard

Canada	v	United Arab Emirates

Match abandoned
Forthill, Dundee
Umpires: Iain McDonald (Sco) and Ryan Milne (Sco)

- No toss.
- No play was possible due to rain.

==== 3rd ODI ====
7 August 2026
11:00
Scorecard

Scotland; 281/7 (50 overs)	v	Canada; 272 (49.2 overs)
Finlay McCreath 112 (140); Zahid Shirzad 3/55 (10 overs)		Yuvraj Samra 78 (65); Brandon McMullen 3/43 (10 overs)

Scotland won by 9 runs
Forthill, Dundee
Umpires: David McLean (Sco) and Gazi Sohel (Ban)
Player of the match: Finlay McCreath (Sco)

- Canada won the toss and elected to field.
- Meet Patel (Can) and Zainullah Ihsan (Sco) both made their ODI debuts.
- Finlay McCreath (Sco) scored his maiden century in ODIs.

==== 4th ODI ====
9 August 2026
11:00
Scorecard

United Arab Emirates; 231/8 (40 overs)	v	Scotland; 235/9 (39.5 overs)
Adeeb Usmani 116 (126); Brandon McMullen 3/30 (8 overs)		Matthew Cross 66 (51); Muhammad Jawadullah 3/47 (8 overs)

Scotland won by 1 wicket
Forthill, Dundee
Umpires: Iain McDonald (Sco) and Gazi Sohel (Ban)
Player of the match: Matthew Cross (Sco)

- Scotland won the toss and elected to field.
- The match was reduced to 40 overs per side due to rain.
- Muhammad Arfan (UAE) made his ODI debut.
- Adeeb Usmani (UAE) scored his first century in ODIs.

==== 5th ODI ====
11 August 2026
11:00
Scorecard

United Arab Emirates; 282/6 (50 overs)	v	Canada; 185 (33.4 overs)
Rahul Chopra 127* (118); Kaleem Sana 3/39 (10 overs)		Aaron Johnson 70 (73); Muhammad Jawadullah 3/36 (7 overs)

United Arab Emirates won by 97 runs
Forthill, Dundee
Umpires: David McLean (Sco) and Ryan Milne (Sco)
Player of the match: Rahul Chopra (UAE)

- Canada won the toss and elected to field.
- Anoop Chima and Ali Khan (Can) both made their ODI debuts.

==== 6th ODI ====
13 August 2026
11:00
Scorecard

Scotland; 347/7 (50 overs)	v	Canada; 177 (35 overs)
Richie Berrington 120 (103); Zahid Shirzad 4/60 (10 overs)		Pargat Singh 42 (68); Lyle Robertson 6/52 (10 overs)

Scotland won by 170 runs
Forthill, Dundee
Umpires: Iain McDonald (Sco) and Gazi Sohel (Ban)
Player of the match: Lyle Robertson (Sco)

- Scotland won the toss and elected to bat.
- Lyle Robertson (Sco) made his ODI debut.
- Lyle Robertson (Sco) took his first five-wicket haul in ODIs.
