= 2021 Women's T20I Inter-Insular Series =

Planned cricket tour

2021 Inter-Insular Women's T20 Series
	Jersey women	Guernsey women
- Dates: 23 – 25 July 2021

Twenty20 International series

The 2021 Inter-Insular Women's T20 Series was scheduled to be played in July 2021 and would have seen Guernsey women's cricket team tour Jersey for three Women's Twenty20 International (WT20I) matches. The series was to be played at Farmers' Field in Saint Martin. The traditional annual 50-over Inter-insular match between the men's teams of Jersey and Guernsey was scheduled to follow in August 2021, if conditions had allowed. Guernsey won the single WT20I when the sides last met during the 2019 T20 Inter-Insular Cup.

Junior inter-insular matches were also scheduled for early July. However, these games were cancelled due to ongoing travel restrictions between the two islands as a result of the COVID-19 pandemic, with the women's series and men's match also put in doubt. The women's series and the men's match were later postponed due to continued travel restrictions between the islands. The boards announced that they hoped to play home and away series in 2022 if space can be found in their schedules.

== WT20I series ==
=== 1st WT20I ===
23 July 2021
14:00

Jersey	v	Guernsey

Cancelled
Farmers' Field, Saint Martin

=== 2nd WT20I ===
24 July 2021
14:00

Jersey	v	Guernsey

Cancelled
Farmers' Field, Saint Martin

=== 3rd WT20I ===
25 July 2021
14:00

Jersey	v	Guernsey

Cancelled
Farmers' Field, Saint Martin
