= 2026 Men's T20 World Cup Europe Sub-regional Qualifier A =

Qualification tournament for the 2028 T20WC in Europe region

2026 ICC Men's T20 World Cup Europe Sub-regional Qualifier A
- Dates: 16 – 23 May 2026
- Administrator: ICC Europe
- Cricket format: Twenty20 International
- Tournament format(s): Group stage and Knockouts
- Host: Cyprus
- Champions: Jersey
- Runners-up: Guernsey
- Participants: 10
- Matches: 24
- Most runs: (Croatia) Connor Carroll (395)
- Most wickets: (Jersey) Julius Sumerauer (11)

The 2026 ICC Men's T20 World Cup Europe Sub-regional Qualifier A was a cricket tournament that formed part of the qualification process for the 2028 Men's T20 World Cup. It was played in Cyprus from 16 to 23 May 2026.

The finalists of the tournament advanced to the regional final, where they were joined by Scotland who were given a bye after having participated in the previous T20 World Cup, and three other teams from sub-regional qualifiers B and C.

Channel Island rivals Jersey and Guernsey won their groups to advance to the final. Jersey won the final by four-wickets, chasing down a target of 140 with two overs to spare and in doing so made it through to the final round of qualifying for the T20 World Cup for the sixth time.

Initially, only the winner of the tournament was set to advance to the regional final. However, after a review of the regional qualification pathway in August 2026, the top two teams were granted places in the regional final.

== Venue ==
| Episkopi | 2026 Men's T20 World Cup Europe Sub-regional Qualifier A (Cyprus) |
|---|---|
| Happy Valley Ground | 2026 Men's T20 World Cup Europe Sub-regional Qualifier A (Cyprus) |
| Capacity: N/A | 2026 Men's T20 World Cup Europe Sub-regional Qualifier A (Cyprus) |
| Matches: 24 (Note: Included matches played at Happy Valley Ground 2.) | 2026 Men's T20 World Cup Europe Sub-regional Qualifier A (Cyprus) |

== Squads ==
| Austria | Croatia | Cyprus | France | Guernsey |
|---|---|---|---|---|
| Aqib Iqbal (c); Zeshan Arif; Imran Asif; Mehar Cheema (wk); Kumud Jha; Baseer Khan; Amar Naeem (wk); Armaan Randhawa; Irfan Safi; Karanbir Singh; Nageebullah Sultanzai; Umair Tariq; Bilal Zalmai; Mohammed Zalmai | Anthony Razmilic (c); Petar Bosnjak (wk); Connor Carroll; Andrija Curavic; Nikola Davidovic; Damien Hall; Rashid Hashmi (wk); Sam Houghton (wk); Sajid Khan; Saghar Manzoor; Jared Newton; Borna Pejic; Matija Separovic; Oliver Tilley | Alexander Senn (c); Waqar Ali; Ashish Bam (wk); Subbareddy Alavala; Ruel Brathwaite; Mangala Gunasekara; Roman Mazumder; Adam Senn; Arjun Shahi; Karan Singh; Lovedeep Singh; Taranjit Singh; Roshan Siriwardena; Sachithra Tharanga (wk) | Dawood Ahmadzai (c); Abdurrahman Ahmadzai; Kamran Ahmadzai; Virk Ali; Noman Amjad; Nasibullah Arab; Hevit Jackson (wk); Usman Khan; Gustav McKeon; Rahimgul Naseri; Mohammad Khan Rafah; Christian Roberts; Zada Sher; Zaheer Zahiri | Ollie Nightingale (c); Martin-Dale Bradley (vc); Lucas Barker; Luke Bichard; Alex Bushell (wk); Josh Butler; Oliver Clapham; Issac Damarell (wk); Ben Ferbrache; Charlie Forshaw; Adam Martel; Tom Nightingale; Ed Robinson; Matthew Stokes |
| Jersey | Malta | Slovenia | Sweden | Switzerland |
| Charles Perchard (c); Daniel Birrell; Dominic Blampied; Charlie Brennan; Harrison Carlyon; Patrick Gouge (wk); Nick Greenwood; Jonty Jenner; Theo Pullman; George Richardson; Julius Sumerauer; Zak Tribe; Scott van Breda (wk); Benjamin Ward | Mehboob Ali (c); Muhammad Ajmal; Imran Ameer; Micheal Das; Rockey Dianish; Zeeshan Khan; Shrijaykumar Patel (wk); Priyan Pushparajan; Muhammad Qasim; Salman Sharjeel; Jaspal Singh; Jaswinder Singh; Ajin Soman; Flynn Zahra (wk) | Izaz Ali (c); Shiva Mani (vc); Saeed Waqar Ali; Shahid Arshad; Owen Groves; Waqar Khan (wk); Jack Kovačič; Arul Kumaran; Dinesh Matla; Taher Mohammad (wk); Dileep Pallekonda; Tomaž Pazlar; Tarun Sharma (wk); Rizwan Zahoor | Imal Zuwak (c); Awais Ahmad; Zaid Ahmad; Saeed Ahmed; Abdul Naser Baluch; Wynand Boshoff (wk); Yatharth Chauhan; Advait Dhabe; Darshan Lakhani; Ajay Mundra (wk); Zain Muzaffar; Sami Rahmani; Shreyas Swamy; Zabiullah Zahid | Harsha Deshan (c); Musa Khan Ahmadzai; Muralitharan Gnanasekaram; Ahmed Hassan (wk); Izhar Hussain; Diyon Johnson; Aneesh Kumar; Shankar Panguluri; Sheraz Sarwari; Jai Sinh; Malyar Stanikzai; Jai Tiwari; Arjun Vinod; Ashwin Vinod |

== Group stage ==
=== Group A ===
Group A standings
| Pos | Team | Pld | W | L | NR | Pts | NRR | Qualification |
|---|---|---|---|---|---|---|---|---|
| 1 | Jersey | 4 | 4 | 0 | 0 | 8 | 4.352 | Advanced to the final |
| 2 | France | 4 | 3 | 1 | 0 | 6 | 1.537 | Advanced to the 3rd place play-off |
| 3 | Croatia | 4 | 2 | 2 | 0 | 4 | −2.100 | Advanced to the 5th place play-off |
| 4 | Switzerland | 4 | 1 | 3 | 0 | 2 | −1.333 | Advanced to the 7th place play-off |
| 5 | Cyprus (H) | 4 | 0 | 4 | 0 | 0 | −1.829 | Eliminated |

Source: ESPNcricinfo
(H) Host

16 May 2026
10:30
Scorecard

| Cyprus; 115/9 (20 overs) | v | France; 119/2 (12.5 overs) |
| Adam Senn 45 (37); Abdurrahman Ahmadzai 2/9 (4 overs) | | Gustav McKeon 56* (28); Arjun Shahi 1/19 (2 overs) |

France won by 8 wickets
Happy Valley Ground, Episkopi
Umpires: Nitin Bathi (Ned) and Gareth Morrison (Ire)
Player of the match: Gustav McKeon (Fra)

- Cyprus won the toss and elected to bat.

16 May 2026
15:30
Scorecard

| Switzerland; 73 (16.5 overs) | v | Jersey; 75/1 (7.1 overs) |
| Arjun Vinod 18 (15); Julius Sumerauer 4/21 (3.5 overs) | | Nick Greenwood 34* (21); Ashwin Vinod 1/20 (2 overs) |

Jersey won by 9 wickets
Happy Valley Ground 2, Episkopi
Umpires: Nitin Bathi (Ned) and Iain McDonald (Sco)
Player of the match: Benjamin Ward (Jer)

- Switzerland won the toss and elected to bat.
- Musa Khan Ahmadzai (Sui) made his T20I debut.

17 May 2026
10:30
Scorecard

| France; 208/4 (20 overs) | v | Croatia; 126 (16.4 overs) |
| Gustav McKeon 59 (30); Damien Hall 1/31 (4 overs) | | Connor Carroll 71 (34); Usman Khan 4/20 (3.4 overs) |

France won by 82 runs
Happy Valley Ground, Episkopi
Umpires: Nitin Bathi (Ned) and Mark Duffy (Cyp)
Player of the match: Usman Khan (Fra)

- France won the toss and elected to bat.
- Connor Carroll, Damien Hall, Jared Newton and Matija Separovic (Cro) all made their T20I debuts.

17 May 2026
15:30
Scorecard

| Jersey; 172/9 (20 overs) | v | Cyprus; 120/9 (20 overs) |
| Julius Sumerauer 43 (16); Adam Senn 4/34 (4 overs) | | Adam Senn 28 (27); Julius Sumerauer 3/29 (4 overs) |

Jersey won by 52 runs
Happy Valley Ground 2, Episkopi
Umpires: Nitin Bathi (Ned) and Mike Burns (Eng)
Player of the match: Julius Sumerauer (Jer)

- Jersey won the toss and elected to bat.

19 May 2026
10:30
Scorecard

| France; 145 (19.2 overs) | v | Jersey; 148/2 (15.5 overs) |
| Mohammad Khan Rafah 47 (26); Zak Tribe 2/2 (1.2 overs) | | Harrison Carlyon 57* (42); Mohammad Khan Rafah 1/24 (4 overs) |

Jersey won by 8 wickets
Happy Valley Ground, Episkopi
Umpires: Rizwan Akram (Ned) and Mike Burns (Eng)
Player of the match: Harrison Carlyon (Jer)

- Jersey won the toss and elected to field.
- Harrison Carlyon (Jer) scored his 1000th run in T20Is.

19 May 2026
15:30
Scorecard

| Croatia; 199/2 (20 overs) | v | Switzerland; 183/8 (20 overs) |
| Connor Carroll 150* (72); Malyar Stanikzai 2/37 (4 overs) | | Jai Sinh 55 (37); Damien Hall 2/28 (4 overs) |

Croatia won by 16 runs
Happy Valley Ground 2, Episkopi
Umpires: Gareth Morrison (Ire) and Mike Burns (Eng)
Player of the match: Connor Carroll (Cro)

- Croatia won the toss and elected to bat.
- Connor Carroll became the first player from Croatia to score a century in T20Is.

20 May 2026
10:30
Scorecard

| Switzerland; 155/9 (20 overs) | v | Cyprus; 130 (19.1 overs) |
| Arjun Vinod 33 (28); Adam Senn 4/32 (4 overs) | | Alexander Senn 32 (47); Musa Khan Ahmadzai 3/7 (3.1 overs) |

Switzerland won by 25 runs
Happy Valley Ground, Episkopi
Umpires: Rizwan Akram (Ned) and Nitin Bathi (Ned)
Player of the match: Musa Khan Ahmadzai (Sui)

- Cyprus won the toss and elected to field.

20 May 2026
15:30
Scorecard

| Jersey; 280/3 (20 overs) | v | Croatia; 171 (19.3 overs) |
| Harrison Carlyon 83 (42); Nikola Davidovic 1/33 (2 overs) | | Connor Carroll 74 (31); Zak Tribe 3/13 (3 overs) |

Jersey won by 109 runs
Happy Valley Ground 2, Episkopi
Umpires: Rizwan Akram (Ned) and Iain McDonald (Sco)
Player of the match: Harrison Carlyon (Jer)

- Croatia won the toss and elected to field.

22 May 2026
10:30
Scorecard

| France; 149/7 (20 overs) | v | Switzerland; 141/9 (20 overs) |
| Christian Roberts 34 (34); Aneesh Kumar 2/14 (3 overs) | | Malyar Stanikzai 34 (22); Mohammad Khan Rafah 3/22 (4 overs) |

France won by 8 runs
Happy Valley Ground, Episkopi
Umpires: Rizwan Akram (Ned) and Iain McDonald (Sco)
Player of the match: Usman Khan (Fra)

- France won the toss and elected to bat.
- Shankar Panguluri (Sui) made his T20I debut.
- Gustav McKeon (Fra) became the first player for France to score 1000 runs in T20Is.

22 May 2026
15:30
Scorecard

| Croatia; 147/9 (20 overs) | v | Cyprus; 140/6 (20 overs) |
| Connor Carroll 95 (57); Waqar Ali 2/22 (4 overs) | | Roman Mazumder 62 (67); Oliver Tilley 2/19 (2 overs) |

Croatia won by 7 runs
Happy Valley Ground 2, Episkopi
Umpires: Nitin Bathi (Ned) and Iain McDonald (Sco)
Player of the match: Connor Carroll (Cro)

- Cyprus won the toss and elected to field.
- Borna Pejic (Cro) made his T20I debut.

=== Group B ===
Group B standings
| Pos | Team | Pld | W | L | NR | Pts | NRR | Qualification |
|---|---|---|---|---|---|---|---|---|
| 1 | Guernsey | 4 | 4 | 0 | 0 | 8 | 2.286 | Advanced to the final |
| 2 | Sweden | 4 | 2 | 2 | 0 | 4 | 0.422 | Advanced to the 3rd place play-off |
| 3 | Austria | 4 | 2 | 2 | 0 | 4 | 0.284 | Advanced to the 5th place play-off |
| 4 | Malta | 4 | 2 | 2 | 0 | 4 | −0.084 | Advanced to the 7th place play-off |
| 5 | Slovenia | 4 | 0 | 4 | 0 | 0 | −3.181 | Eliminated |

Source: ESPNcricinfo

16 May 2026
10:30
Scorecard

| Guernsey; 151/8 (20 overs) | v | Sweden; 139 (19.4 overs) |
| Matthew Stokes 51 (41); Zabiullah Zahid 2/17 (4 overs) | | Yatharth Chauhan 48 (40); Ed Robinson 2/12 (2.4 overs) |

Guernsey won by 12 runs
Happy Valley Ground, Episkopi
Umpires: Rizwan Akram (Ned) and Mike Burns (Eng)
Player of the match: Matthew Stokes (Gue)

- Sweden won the toss and elected to field.

16 May 2026
15:30
Scorecard

| Malta; 140 (20 overs) | v | Austria; 141/3 (12.5 overs) |
| Muhammad Qasim 58 (42); Kumud Jha 2/21 (3 overs) | | Imran Asif 39* (21); Salman Sharjeel 1/16 (1 over) |

Austria won by 7 wickets
Happy Valley Ground 2, Episkopi
Umpires: Mike Burns (Eng) and Mark Duffy (Cyp)
Player of the match: Bilal Zalmai (Aut)

- Austria won the toss and elected to field.

17 May 2026
10:30
Scorecard

| Malta; 74 (18.2 overs) | v | Guernsey; 78/4 (11.2 overs) |
| Mehboob Ali 26 (26); Martin-Dale Bradley 4/9 (4 overs) | | Ollie Nightingale 28 (23); Jaswinder Singh 1/8 (1 over) |

Guernsey won by 6 wickets
Happy Valley Ground, Episkopi
Umpires: Gareth Morrison (Ire) and Iain McDonald (Sco)
Player of the match: Martin-Dale Bradley (Gue)

- Guernsey won the toss and elected to field.

17 May 2026
15:30
Scorecard

| Slovenia; 164/6 (20 overs) | v | Austria; 165/8 (18.4 overs) |
| Izaz Ali 83 (42); Bilal Zalmai 3/27 (4 overs) | | Armaan Randhawa 50* (30); Dileep Pallekonda 3/26 (4 overs) |

Austria won by 2 wickets
Happy Valley Ground 2, Episkopi
Umpires: Rizwan Akram (Ned) and Gareth Morrison (Ire)

- Slovenia won the toss and elected to bat.
- Jack Kovacic and Shiva Mani (Slo) both made their T20I debuts.

19 May 2026
10:30
Scorecard

| Slovenia; 133/6 (20 overs) | v | Sweden; 136/3 (14.2 overs) |
| Owen Groves 77* (66); Awais Ahmad 1/15 (3 overs) | | Ajay Mundra 76* (46); Saeed Waqar Ali 2/23 (2 overs) |

Sweden won by 7 wickets
Happy Valley Ground, Episkopi
Umpires: Mark Duffy (Cyp) and Iain McDonald (Sco)
Player of the match: Ajay Mundra (Swe)

- Slovenia won the toss and elected to bat.

19 May 2026
15:30
Scorecard

| Guernsey; 196/7 (20 overs) | v | Austria; 150 (17.4 overs) |
| Josh Butler 68 (49); Waqar Zalmai 2/23 (2 overs) | | Karanbir Singh 59 (30); Luke Bichard 3/24 (3 overs) |

Guernsey won by 46 runs
Happy Valley Ground 2, Episkopi
Umpires: Nitin Bathi (Ned) and Mark Duffy (Cyp)
Player of the match: Matthew Stokes (Gue)

- Austria won the toss and elected to field.
- Josh Butler (Gue) scored his 1000th run in T20Is.

20 May 2026
10:30
Scorecard

| Slovenia; 99 (19.4 overs) | v | Guernsey; 103/6 (14.1 overs) |
| Jack Kovacic 25 (16); Josh Butler 3/16 (4 overs) | | Martin-Dale Bradley 23* (14); Jack Kovacic 2/18 (4 overs) |

Guernsey won by 4 wickets
Happy Valley Ground, Episkopi
Umpires: Mike Burns (Eng) and Gareth Morrison (Ire)
Player of the match: Josh Butler (Gue)

- Slovenia won the toss and elected to bat.
- Arul Kumaran (Slo) made his T20I debut.

20 May 2026
15:30
Scorecard

| Sweden; 181/8 (20 overs) | v | Malta; 182/4 (19 overs) |
| Wynand Boshoff 40 (26); Mehboob Ali 2/33 (4 overs) | | Priyan Pushparajan 52 (36); Sami Rahmani 2/30 (4 overs) |

Malta won by 6 wickets
Happy Valley Ground 2, Episkopi
Umpires: Mark Duffy (Cyp) and Gareth Morrison (Ire)
Player of the match: Mehboob Ali (Mlt)

- Malta won the toss and elected to field.

22 May 2026
10:30
Scorecard

| Austria; 148 (19.4 overs) | v | Sweden; 149/7 (19.3 overs) |
| Aqib Iqbal 27 (23); Sami Rahmani 4/27 (4 overs) | | Yatharth Chauhan 45* (39); Baseer Khan 4/14 (4 overs) |

Sweden won by 3 wickets
Happy Valley Ground, Episkopi
Umpires: Mike Burns (Eng) and Mark Duffy (Cyp)
Player of the match: Yatharth Chauhan (Swe)

- Sweden won the toss and elected to field.

22 May 2026
15:30
Scorecard

| Slovenia; 68 (17 overs) | v | Malta; 69/1 (5.3 overs) |
| Shahid Arshad 18 (22); Muhammad Ajmal 4/6 (4 overs) | | Priyan Pushparajan 28* (11); Jack Kovacic 1/26 (3 overs) |

Malta won by 9 wickets
Happy Valley Ground 2, Episkopi
Umpires: Mark Duffy (Cyp) and Gareth Morrison (Ire)
Player of the match: Muhammad Ajmal (Mlt)

- Slovenia won the toss and elected to bat.

== Play-offs ==
=== 7th place play-off ===
23 May 2026
10:30
Scorecard

| Malta; 139 (20 overs) | v | Switzerland; 145/7 (19.3 overs) |
| Muhammad Qasim 29 (23); Ashwin Vinod 3/21 (4 overs) | | Harsha Deshan 36* (22); Muhammad Qasim 3/29 (4 overs) |

Switzerland won by 3 wickets
Happy Valley Ground 2, Episkopi
Umpires: Rizwan Akram (Ned) and Nitin Bathi (Ned)
Player of the match: Ashwin Vinod (Sui)

- Switzerland won the toss and elected to field.

=== 5th place play-off ===
23 May 2026
15:30
Scorecard

| Croatia; 160/6 (20 overs) | v | Austria; 164/5 (16.5 overs) |
| Jared Newton 50 (46); Aqib Iqbal 2/21 (4 overs) | | Bilal Zalmai 68 (30); Damien Hall 2/31 (4 overs) |

Austria won by 5 wickets
Happy Valley Ground 2, Episkopi
Umpires: Nitin Bathi (Ned) and Mark Duffy (Cyp)
Player of the match: Aqib Iqbal (Aut)

- Croatia won the toss and elected to bat.

=== 3rd place play-off ===
23 May 2026
10:30
Scorecard

| France; 134 (19.4 overs) | v | Sweden; 139/4 (18.1 overs) |
| Kamran Ahmadzai 38 (30); Abdul Naser Baluch 3/18 (4 overs) | | Wynand Boshoff 56* (35); Dawood Ahmadzai 2/14 (4 overs) |

Sweden won by 6 wickets
Happy Valley Ground, Episkopi
Umpires: Mike Burns (Eng) and Iain McDonald (Sco)
Player of the match: Wynand Boshoff (Swe)

- Sweden won the toss and elected to field.

=== Final ===
23 May 2026
15:30
Scorecard

| Guernsey; 139/5 (20 overs) | v | Jersey; 140/6 (18 overs) |
| Josh Butler 50 (41); Zak Tribe 2/10 (3 overs) | | Zak Tribe 54* (40); Luke Bichard 2/18 (3 overs) |

Jersey won by 4 wickets
Happy Valley Ground, Episkopi
Umpires: Rizwan Akram (Ned) and Gareth Morrison (Ire)
Player of the match: Zak Tribe (Jer)

- Guernsey won the toss and elected to bat.
