= Le Tissier =

Le Tissier is a surname of French origin found commonly on the British island of Guernsey. Individuals with the name include:

- Luke Le Tissier (born 1996), cricketer
- Matt Le Tissier (born 1968), footballer
- Maya Le Tissier (born 2002), footballer

== See also ==
- Christine and the Queens, born Héloïse Adélaïde Letissier
