= List of Guernsey Twenty20 International cricketers =

This is a list of Guernsey Twenty20 International cricketers.

In April 2018, the ICC decided to grant full Twenty20 International (T20I) status to all its members. Therefore, all Twenty20 matches played between Guernsey and other ICC members after 1 January 2019 have T20I status.

This list comprises all members of the Guernsey cricket team who have played at least one T20I match. It is initially arranged in the order in which each player won his first Twenty20 cap. Where more than one player won his first Twenty20 cap in the same match, those players are listed alphabetically by surname.

Guernsey played their first match with T20I status on 31 May 2019 against Jersey during the 2019 T20 Inter-Insular Cup.

== Key ==
General

- ‡ – Captain
- † – Wicket-keeper
- First – Year of debut
- Last – Year of latest game
- Mat – Number of matches played

Batting

- Runs – Runs scored in career
- HS – Highest score
- Avg – Runs scored per dismissal
- 50 – Half-centuries scored
- 100 – Centuries scored
- * – Batsman remained not out

Bowling

- Balls – Balls bowled in career
- Wkt – Wickets taken in career
- BBI – Best bowling in an innings
- Ave – Average runs per wicket

Fielding

- Ca – Catches taken
- St – Stumpings affected

== List of players ==
Statistics are correct as of 23 May 2026.

Guernsey T20I cricketers
General					Batting					Bowling				Fielding		Ref
No.	Name	First	Last	Mat	Runs	HS	Avg	50	100	Balls	Wkt	BBI	Ave	Ca	St	Ref
1	Lucas Barker	2019	2026	22	174	25	9.66	0	0	–	–	–	–	4	0	
2	Nic Buckle	2019	2019	3	1	1*	–	0	0	60	3	3/26	25.33	1	0	
3	Josh Butler‡	2019	2026	47	1,087	87	27.87	5	0	108	5	3/16	24.80	18	0	
4	Ben Ferbrache	2019	2026	41	328	55	16.40	1	0	–	–	–	–	23	0	
5	David Hooper	2019	2023	24	129	19*	16.12	0	0	473	19	3/5	31.15	7	0	
6	Luke Le Tissier	2019	2023	20	184	37	11.50	0	0	264	17	3/17	15.94	2	0	
7	Oliver Newey†	2019	2022	10	69	23*	11.50	0	0	–	–	–	–	4	1	
8	William Peatfield	2019	2022	21	31	12*	15.50	0	0	450	29	4/22	15.75	1	0	
9	Anthony Stokes	2019	2025	21	60	18*	6.00	0	0	422	23	3/9	18.47	11	0	
10	Matthew Stokes‡	2019	2026	55	1368	100	40.23	7	1	674	33	3/42	24.66	24	0	
11	Ashley Wright	2019	2019	8	72	43	10.28	0	0	–	–	–	–	1	0	
12	Luke Nussbaumer	2019	2019	1	0	0	0.00	0	0	24	2	2/44	22.00	1	0	
13	Thomas Veillard	2019	2019	4	11	8	11.00	0	0	96	4	1/15	23.25	1	0	
14	Charles Vorster	2019	2019	1	5	5	5.00	0	0	18	1	1/32	32.00	0	0	
15	Tom Kimber†	2019	2019	3	5	2	1.66	0	0	–	–	–	–	0	1	
16	Jordan Martel	2019	2019	3	13	13*	–	0	0	66	6	3/15	9.83	0	0	
17	Luke Bichard	2020	2026	45	51	25*	10.20	0	0	907	52	4/20	20.09	16	0	
18	Matthew Breban	2020	2020	1	–	–	–	–	–	24	3	3/24	8.00	0	0	
19	Isaac Damarell†	2020	2026	44	655	52	20.46	2	0	–	–	–	–	33	12	
20	Jason Martin†	2020	2022	4	35	19*	35.00	0	0	–	–	–	–	1	4	
21	Tom Nightingale	2020	2026	48	864	75	21.07	4	0	182	5	2/26	45.80	27	0	
22	Declan Martel	2022	2024	6	14	10	7.00	0	0	98	3	1/8	35.33	1	0	
23	Oliver Nightingale‡	2022	2026	42	538	57	25.61	1	0	–	–	–	–	12	0	
24	Ben Wentzel	2022	2022	1	1	1	1.00	0	0	–	–	–	–	0	0	
25	Benjamin Johnson	2022	2022	1	–	–	–	–	–	12	0	–	–	0	0	
26	Adam Martel	2022	2026	36	125	23*	10.41	0	0	657	34	3/10	22.08	7	0	
27	Martin-Dale Bradley	2023	2026	32	199	33	14.61	0	0	634	34	4/9	20.29	5	0	
28	Ben Fitchet	2023	2025	20	349	41	17.45	0	0	–	–	–	–	6	0	
29	Dane Mullen	2023	2024	10	13	9*	13.00	0	0	191	9	3/26	24.77	2	0	
30	Thomas Kirk	2023	2023	1	2	2	2.00	0	0	24	1	1/28	28.00	0	0	
31	Alex Bushell†	2023	2026	7	27	14*	13.50	0	0	–	–	–	–	3	1	
32	G. H. Smit	2023	2023	3	62	56	20.66	1	0	–	–	–	–	0	0	
33	Harry Johnson	2024	2025	14	4	2*	4.00	0	0	285	15	3/18	27.20	1	0	
34	Charlie Forshaw	2024	2026	16	21	12	10.50	0	0	282	23	3/17	16.73	3	0	
35	Charles Birch	2025	2025	2	–	–	–	–	–	–	–	–	–	1	0	
36	Charlie Simmonds†	2025	2025	1	–	–	–	–	–	–	–	–	–	0	0	
37	Oliver Clapham	2025	2025	1	–	–	–	–	–	–	–	–	–	0	0	
38	Ed Robinson	2025	2026	9	53	42	53.00	0	0	88	11	3/34	11.00	4	0	
