= List of Jersey Twenty20 International cricketers =

This is a list of Jersey Twenty20 International cricketers.

In April 2018, the ICC decided to grant full Twenty20 International (T20I) status to all its members. Therefore, all Twenty20 matches played between Jersey and other ICC members after 1 January 2019 have T20I status.

This list comprises all members of the Jersey cricket team who have played at least one T20I match. It is initially arranged in the order in which each player won his first Twenty20 cap. Where more than one player won his first Twenty20 cap in the same match, their surnames are listed alphabetically.

Jersey played their first match with T20I status on 31 May 2019 against Guernsey during the 2019 T20 Inter-Insular Cup.

== Key ==
General

- ‡ – Captain
- † – Wicket-keeper
- First – Year of debut
- Last – Year of latest game
- Mat – Number of matches played

Batting

- Runs – Runs scored in career
- HS – Highest score
- Avg – Runs scored per dismissal
- * – Batsman remained not out
- 50 – Half-centuries scored
- 100 – Centuries scored

Bowling

- Balls – Balls bowled in career
- Wkt – Wickets taken in career
- BBI – Best bowling in an innings
- Ave – Average runs per wicket

Fielding

- Ca – Catches taken
- St – Stumpings affected

== List of players ==
Statistics are correct as of 23 May 2026.

Jersey T20I cricketers
General					Batting					Bowling				Fielding		Ref
No.	Name	First	Last	Mat	Runs	HS	Avg	50	100	Balls	Wkt	BBI	Ave	Ca	St	Ref
1	Corey Bisson	2019	2019	14	226	54	18.83	1	0	–	–	–	–	3	0	
2	Dominic Blampied‡	2019	2026	50	345	43*	17.25	0	0	845	49	4/20	19.46	21	0	
3	Jake Dunford†	2019	2024	39	161	45*	20.12	0	0	–	–	–	–	18	15	
4	Nick Ferraby	2019	2021	18	314	81*	18.47	1	0	–	–	–	–	2	0	
5	Anthony Hawkins-Kay	2019	2019	16	122	27*	15.25	0	0	216	14	4/14	19.00	7	0	
6	Jonty Jenner‡	2019	2026	61	1,541	96*	32.10	8	0	–	–	–	–	46	0	
7	Elliot Miles	2019	2023	33	36	16	7.20	0	0	642	40	3/10	17.39	6	0	
8	Charles Perchard‡	2019	2026	58	128	26*	10.66	0	0	1,158	87	5/17	13.78	23	0	
9	William Robertson	2019	2019	6	1	1*	–	0	0	109	3	1/7	33.66	0	0	
10	Ben Stevens	2019	2022	20	327	44	17.21	0	0	267	13	3/17	21.92	18	0	
11	Julius Sumerauer	2019	2026	49	424	54*	15.14	1	0	859	49	4/22	22.04	24	0	
12	Harrison Carlyon	2019	2026	59	1,089	110	23.17	6	1	495	26	3/14	18.65	10	0	
13	Rhys Palmer	2019	2023	10	11	5*	–	0	0	162	7	2/21	23.71	2	0	
14	Benjamin Ward	2019	2026	48	644	58*	25.76	1	0	1,027	66	4/6	14.75	17	0	
15	Nick Greenwood	2019	2026	42	1,115	86*	29.34	5	0	384	18	3/8	21.66	17	0	
16	Asa Tribe†	2021	2025	26	564	73*	25.63	4	0	36	0	–	–	10	2	
17	Zak Tribe	2021	2026	32	464	54*	21.09	1	0	108	10	3/13	9.00	11	0	
18	Daniel Birrell	2021	2026	17	14	6*	7.00	0	0	334	21	3/19	18.28	9	0	
19	Charlie Brennan	2021	2026	34	491	67*	20.05	2	0	–	–	–	–	11	0	
20	Josh Lawrenson	2023	2024	12	103	36	17.16	0	0	–	–	–	–	5	0	
21	Patrick Gouge†	2023	2026	14	328	58	35.44	3	0	–	–	–	–	10	2	
22	Jack Kemp†	2024	2024	5	4	3	2.00	0	0	–	–	–	–	1	2	
23	George Richardson	2024	2026	4	0	0*	–	0	0	67	4	2/17	23.25	0	0	
24	William Perchard	2024	2025	4	34	29*	–	0	0	36	0	–	–	0	0	
25	Scott Simpson	2024	2024	2	8	8*	–	0	0	48	6	4/18	7.83	0	0	
26	Toby Britton	2024	2024	1	–	–	–	–	–	24	2	2/21	10.50	0	0	
27	Stanley Norman	2025	2025	3	6	6	3.00	0	0	–	–	–	–	1	0	
28	Scott van Breda	2025	2025	2	3	3	3.00	0	0	18	18	0	–	0	0	
29	Theo Pullman	2025	2025	1	–	–	–	–	–	18	1	1/26	26.00	0	0	

== See also ==
- List of Jersey women Twenty20 International cricketers
