= 2022 T20I Inter-Insular Series =

The 2022 T20I Inter-Insular Series can refer to:

- 2022 Men's T20I Inter-Insular Series, a bilateral cricket series held in May 2022 between the men's national teams of Guernsey and Jersey
- 2022 Women's T20I Inter-Insular Series, a bilateral cricket series held in June 2022 between the women's national teams of Guernsey and Jersey
