= David Hooper =

David Hooper may refer to:

- David Vincent Hooper (1915–1998), British chess player and writer
- David Hooper (cricketer) (born 1991), cricketer for Guernsey
