= Inter-Insular cricket =

Cricket contests between Jersey and Guernsey

Inter-Insular cricket refers to cricket contests between representative teams of Jersey and Guernsey in the Channel Islands. An inter-insular match has been played annually between the two sides since 1950 and often attracts crowds above 1,000. It is often referred as ‘reds vs greens’ contest. The format has varied over the years but has been played as a 50-over contest in recent times and a Women’s Inter-Insular match was first played in 2009. In 2018, the format switched to a series of Twenty20 matches, although the traditional 50-over match returned from 2019 in addition to the Twenty20 series. The Twenty20 matches have had men's Twenty20 International (T20I) status since 2019, as the International Cricket Council granted T20I status to all of its members from the start of the year. On 31 May 2019, there was also a one-off women's Twenty20 International fixture between the two women's teams. It was the first T20I match for both the teams.

== History ==
Guernsey and Jersey had played inter-insular games between clubs in the 1930s. After the war, there had been two annual games which appeared to be made up of players from different clubs to make an island team. In 1949 the press reported that GICC (Guernsey Island Cricket Club) would meet JICC (Jersey Island Cricket Club). It would appear that the games were played all day, irrespective that the second team had passed the score of the first. In 1950, GICC scoring 129, followed by JICC achieving 196 for 4.

In 1951 the media began calling the teams Guernsey and Jersey rather than GICC and JICC. The Elizabeth College magazine for 1951 reported V G Collenette as the captain of the first Guernsey v Jersey match in 1950. The 1952 match did not take place as Jersey did not turn up in Guernsey, having "forgotten to select a team", according to the Guernsey Press reporter. The same problem occurred in 1956. Caps for the inter island match were first awarded by GCA (Guernsey Cricket Association) in 1960, but backdated to 1957. GCA claimed the first match was in 1957.

Jersey claimed an outright win in 1960, followed by three successive wins for Guernsey. Several draws took place in the 1960s and 70s, leading to the match being switched to a pure limited overs format rather than a timed game. Between 1992 and 2001, Jersey won ten matches in a row.

In 2018, the format switched to a series of Twenty20 matches, but the traditional 50-over match returned from 2019 in addition to the Twenty20 series.

There were no inter-insular matches in 2020 or 2021 due to the COVID-19 pandemic.

== Men's One-Day results (Inter-Insular Trophy) ==
1950–1989
Year	Venue	Winner	Won by
1950	(Guernsey) College Field	Jersey	6 wickets
1951	(Jersey) Victoria College	Match drawn	–
1953	(Jersey) Victoria College	Jersey	2 wickets
1954	(Guernsey) College Field	Jersey	5 wickets
1955	(Jersey) Victoria College	Match drawn	–
1957	(Guernsey) College Field	Match drawn	–
1958	(Jersey) Victoria College	Match drawn	–
1959	(Guernsey) College Field	Match drawn	–
1960	(Jersey) Victoria College	Jersey	2 wickets
1961	(Guernsey) College Field	Guernsey	38 runs
1962	(Jersey) Victoria College	Guernsey	63 runs
1963	(Guernsey) College Field	Guernsey	92 runs
1964	(Jersey) FB Fields	Jersey	7 wickets
1965	(Guernsey) College Field	Match drawn	–
1966	(Jersey) FB Fields	Match drawn	–
1967	(Guernsey) College Field	Match drawn	–
1968	(Jersey) FB Fields	No result	–
1969	(Guernsey) College Field	Jersey	101 runs
1970	(Jersey) FB Fields	Jersey	5 wickets
1971	(Guernsey) College Field	Match drawn	–
1972	(Jersey) FB Fields	Match drawn	–
1973	(Guernsey) College Field	Match drawn	–
1974	(Jersey) FB Fields	Guernsey	10 wickets
1975	(Guernsey) College Field	Guernsey	3 wickets
1976	(Jersey) Victoria College	Match drawn	–
1977	(Guernsey) College Field	Match drawn	–
1978	(Jersey) FB Fields	Jersey	5 wickets
1979	(Guernsey) College Field	Jersey	39 runs
1980	(Jersey) Grainville	Guernsey	40 runs
1981	(Guernsey) College Field	Jersey	55 runs
1982	(Jersey) Grainville	Jersey	8 wickets
1983	(Guernsey) College Field	Jersey	2 wickets
1984	(Jersey) Grainville	Jersey	3 wickets
1985	(Guernsey) College Field	Guernsey	26 runs
1986	(Jersey) Grainville	Jersey	5 wickets
1987	(Guernsey) College Field	Guernsey	35 runs
1988	(Jersey) Grainville	Guernsey	5 wickets
1989	(Guernsey) College Field	Guernsey	57 runs

1990–Present
Year	Venue	Winner	Won by
1990	(Jersey) Grainville	Jersey	9 wickets
1991	(Guernsey) College Field	Guernsey	48 runs
1992	(Jersey) Grainville	Jersey	4 runs
1993	(Guernsey) College Field	Jersey	73 runs
1994	(Jersey) Grainville	Jersey	116 runs
1995	(Guernsey) College Field	Jersey	55 runs
1996	(Jersey) Grainville	Jersey	47 runs
1997	(Guernsey) KGV	Jersey	8 runs
1998	(Jersey) Grainville	Jersey	3 wickets
1999	(Guernsey) College Field	Jersey	95 runs
2000	(Jersey) Grainville	Jersey	56 runs
2001	(Guernsey) KGV	Jersey	50 runs
2002	(Jersey) Grainville	Guernsey	35 runs
2003	(Guernsey) KGV	Guernsey	2 wickets
2004	(Jersey) Grainville	Guernsey	5 wickets
2005	(Guernsey) KGV	Guernsey	89 runs
2006	(Jersey) Grainville	Guernsey	16 runs
2007	(Guernsey) KGV	Jersey	4 runs
2008	(Jersey) Grainville	Jersey	3 wickets
2009	(Guernsey) KGV	Guernsey	21 runs
2010	(Jersey) Grainville	Guernsey	6 wickets
2011	(Guernsey) KGV	Guernsey	147 runs
2012	(Jersey) Grainville	Jersey	9 wickets
2013	(Guernsey) KGV	Jersey	14 runs
2014	(Jersey) Farmers	Jersey	6 wickets
2015	(Guernsey) Port Soif	Guernsey	5 wickets
2016	(Jersey) Grainville	Jersey	49 runs
2017	(Guernsey) KGV	Jersey	2 wickets
2019	(Guernsey) KGV	Jersey	5 wickets
2022	(Jersey) Farmers	Jersey	2 wickets
2023	(Guernsey) KGV	Jersey	173 runs
2024	(Jersey) Grainville	Jersey	2 wickets
2025	(Guernsey) KGV	Jersey	8 wickets
2026	(Jersey) Grainville	Jersey	5 wickets

=== Matches summary (as of 2026) ===
Total	Guernsey wins	Jersey wins	Draws
72	21	37	14

Source: Guernsey Cricket

== Men's Twenty20 series results (Inter-Insular Cup) ==
Year	Venue(s)	Winner	Won by
2018	(Jersey) Farmers	Jersey	3–0
2019	(Guernsey) College Field and KGV	Jersey	3–0
2022	(Guernsey) College Field and KGV	Jersey	3–0
2023	(Jersey) Farmers	Jersey	2–0
2024	(Guernsey) KGV and Port Soif	Jersey	2–1
2025	(Jersey) Grainville	Jersey	2–1

=== Series summary ===
Total	Guernsey wins	Jersey wins	Draws
6	0	6	0

=== Matches summary ===
Total	Guernsey wins	Jersey wins	Tie(s)
17	2	14	1*

Source: Guernsey Cricket *Jersey won a Super over following the tied match.

== Women's Twenty20 series results ==
Year	Venue(s)	Winner	Won by
2019	(Guernsey) College Field	Guernsey	1–0
2022	(Jersey) Grainville	Jersey	3–0
2023	(Guernsey) KGV	Jersey	3–0
2024	(Jersey) Grainville	Jersey	1–0
2025	(Guernsey) KGV	Jersey	1–0
2026	(Jersey) Grainville	Jersey	2–0

=== Series summary ===
Total	Guernsey wins	Jersey wins	Draws
6	1	5	0

=== Matches summary ===
Total	Guernsey wins	Jersey wins	Tie(s)
11	1	10	0

Source: Guernsey Cricket

== Sponsorship ==
- Haig Scotch Whisky Trophy (1978 to 1988)
- Carlsberg Lager Trophy (1989 to 1993)
- Tetley Bitter Challenge (1994 to 1997)
- Flemings Trophy (1998 to 2000)
- Cherry Godfrey Challenge (2003 to 2005)
- HSBC Trophy (2007 to 2009)
- Marlborough Trophy (2010 to 2013)
- NatWest Trophy (2014)
- Odey Wealth Challenge Trophy (2015)
- InfrasoftTech (2018–)

== See also ==
- Muratti Vase - the equivalent event in football
- Siam Cup - the equivalent event in rugby union
- Guernsey cricket team
- Jersey cricket team
- Jersey women's cricket team
- Guernsey women's cricket team
