= Luke Nussbaumer =

Guernsey cricketer (born 1989)

Personal information
- Born: 12 February 1989 (age 37)
- Batting: Right-handed
- Bowling: Right-arm medium

International information
- National side: Guernsey
- Only T20I (cap 12): 1 June 2019 v Jersey

Career statistics
Competition	T20I
Matches	1
Runs scored	0
Batting average	0
100s/50s	0/0
Top score	0
Balls bowled	24
Wickets	2
Bowling average	22.00
5 wickets in innings	0
10 wickets in match	0
Best bowling	2/44
Catches/stumpings	1/–
- Source: Cricinfo, 27 May 2026

Luke Nussbaumer (born 12 February 1989) is a professional cricketer who plays for Guernsey. He played in the 2016 ICC World Cricket League Division Five tournament, taking 8 wickets in 3 matches. In May 2019, he was named in Guernsey's squad for the 2019 T20 Inter-Insular Cup. He made his Twenty20 International (T20I) debut for Guernsey against Jersey on 1 June 2019.
