= Nicholas Ferraby =

English cricketer (born 1983)

Nick Ferraby
Personal information
- Full name: Nicholas John Ferraby
- Born: 31 March 1983 (age 43); Market Harborough, Leicestershire, England
- Batting: Right-handed
- Bowling: Right-arm medium

International information
- National side: Jersey
- T20I debut (cap 4): 31 May 2019 v Guernsey
- Last T20I: 19 October 2021 v Germany

Domestic team information
- Years: Team
- 2010-present: Buckinghamshire
- 2007: Leicestershire
- 2006–2009: Cambridgeshire
- 2002: Leicestershire Cricket Board

Career statistics
| Competition | T20I | FC | LA |
|---|---|---|---|
| Matches | 18 | 3 | 3 |
| Runs scored | 314 | 193 | 14 |
| Batting average | 18.47 | 38.60 | 7.00 |
| 100s/50s | 0/1 | 1/1 | 0/0 |
| Top score | 81* | 107 | 13* |
| Balls bowled | – | 186 | 42 |
| Wickets | – | 4 | 0 |
| Bowling average | – | 28.00 | – |
| 5 wickets in innings | – | 0 | 0 |
| 10 wickets in match | – | 0 | 0 |
| Best bowling | – | 2/19 | – |
| Catches/stumpings | 2/– | 1/– | 0/– |
- Source: Cricinfo, 25 May 2026

Nicholas John Ferraby (born 31 May 1983) is an English cricketer. He is a right-handed batsman who bowls right-arm medium pace. He was born in Market Harborough, Leicestershire.

== Domestic career in England ==
Educated at Oakham School and the University of Oxford, Ferraby represented the Leicestershire Cricket Board in 2 List A matches against Denmark in the 1st round of the 2003 Cheltenham & Gloucester Trophy, and the Kent Cricket Board in the 2nd round of the same competition. Both matches were held in 2002.

In 2006, Ferraby made his debut for Cambridgeshire in the 2006 Minor Counties Championship against Buckinghamshire. From 2006 to 2009, he represented the county in 15 Championship matches, the last of which came against Norfolk. His debut in the MCCA Knockout Trophy came against Oxfordshire in 2006. From 2006 to 2009, he represented the county in 12 Trophy matches, the last of which came against Lincolnshire.

While representing Cambridgeshire, he made his final List A appearance playing for Leicestershire against Glamorgan in the 2007 Pro40. In his 3 career List A matches, he scored 14 runs at a batting average of 7.00, with a high score of 13*. With the ball he bowled 7 wicket-less overs.

In 2010, Ferraby made a single Minor Counties Championship appearance for Buckinghamshire against Hertfordshire.

Ferraby played for Oxford University Cricket Club in 2014.

== Career in Jersey ==
In 2015, Ferraby moved to Jersey where he works as one of the pastors at Jersey Baptist Church He plays cricket in Jersey. In April 2018, he was named in Jersey's squad for the 2018 ICC World Cricket League Division Four tournament in Malaysia.

In May 2019, he was named in Jersey's squad for the 2019 T20 Inter-Insular Cup against Guernsey. He made his Twenty20 International (T20I) debut for Jersey against Guernsey on 31 May 2019. The same month, he was named in Jersey's squad for the Regional Finals of the 2018–19 ICC T20 World Cup Europe Qualifier tournament in Guernsey.

In September 2019, he was named in Jersey's squad for the 2019 ICC T20 World Cup Qualifier tournament in the United Arab Emirates. In October 2021, Ferraby was named in Jersey's T20I squad for the Regional Final of the 2021 ICC Men's T20 World Cup Europe Qualifier tournament.
