= Ashley Wright (cricketer) =

English cricketer

Personal information
- Full name: Ashley Spencer Wright
- Born: 21 October 1980 (age 46); Grantham, Lincolnshire, England
- Batting: Right-handed
- Bowling: Right arm medium
- Relatives: Luke Wright (brother)

International information
- National side: Guernsey
- T20I debut (cap 11): 31 May 2019 v Jersey
- Last T20I: 19 June 2019 v Norway

Domestic team information
- Years: Team
- 2005: Staffordshire
- 2004: Lincolnshire
- 2001–2002: Leicestershire
- 1999-2001: Leicestershire Cricket Board

Career statistics
Competition	T20I	FC	LA	T20
Matches	8	6	13	8
Runs scored	72	124	259	72
Batting average	10.28	13.77	32.37	10.28
100s/50s	0/0	0/0	1/1	0/0
Top score	43	0	112	43
Catches/stumpings	1/–	1/–	2/–	1/
- Source: ESPNcricinfo, 19 June 2019

Ashley Spencer Wright (born 21 October 1980) is an English-born cricket coach and former cricketer. He later went on to represent the Guernsey cricket team. He is currently serving as the batting coach for Pakistan Super League franchise Islamabad United.

Wright played as a right-handed batsman who bowled right-arm medium-pace.

== Career ==
=== England ===
Wright made his List-A debut for the Leicestershire Cricket Board in the 1999 NatWest Trophy. From 1999 to 2001, he 3 List-A matches for the board, making his highest List-A career score of 112 against the Durham Cricket Board in the 2000 NatWest Trophy.

Wright made his first-class debut for Leicestershire in 2001 against the touring Pakistanis. Wright played 6 first-class matches for the county, with his final first-class match for Leicestershire coming against Surrey in the 2002 County Championship. As well as playing first-class cricket for Leicestershire, Wright also played 9 List-A matches for the county from 2001 to 2002, with his last List-A match for the county coming against Worcestershire in the 2002 Norwich Union League.

In 2004, Wright played his final career List-A match in his only List-A appearance for Lincolnshire in the 2004 Cheltenham & Gloucester Trophy against Glamorgan. In 2005, he played a single Minor Counties Championship match for Staffordshire against Bedfordshire.

=== Guernsey ===
In January 2016, Wright was appointed director of cricket for the Guernsey Cricket Board (GCB), a position which includes the role of head coach of the Guernsey national team. He succeeded Nic Pothas.

In May 2019, he was named in Guernsey's squad for the 2019 T20 Inter-Insular Cup. He made his Twenty20 International (T20I) debut for Guernsey against Jersey on 31 May 2019. The same month, he was named in Guernsey's squad for the Regional Finals of the 2018–19 ICC T20 World Cup Europe Qualifier tournament in Guernsey.

He retired from international cricket after in 2019 T20 Inter-Insular Cup.

== Family ==
Ashley's brother Luke Wright played county cricket for Sussex and played ODI and Twenty20 International cricket for England. Luke formerly played his county cricket for Leicestershire. He is from Redmile.
