= Nic Buckle =

Guernsey cricketer

Personal information
- Full name: Nicholas Buckle
- Born: 22 June 2000 (age 26)
- Batting: Right-handed
- Bowling: Right-arm medium

International information
- National side: Guernsey
- T20I debut (cap 2): 31 May 2019 v Jersey
- Last T20I: 15 June 2019 v Jersey

Career statistics
Competition	T20I
Matches	3
Runs scored	1
Batting average	–
100s/50s	0/0
Top score	1*
Balls bowled	60
Wickets	3
Bowling average	25.33
5 wickets in innings	0
10 wickets in match	0
Best bowling	3/26
Catches/stumpings	1/–
- Source: ESPNcricinfo, 26 May 2026

Nic Buckle (born 22 June 2000) is a cricketer who plays for Guernsey.

== Career ==
In May 2019, he was named in Guernsey's squad for the 2019 T20 Inter-Insular Cup, and made his Twenty20 International (T20I) debut against Jersey on 31 May 2019.

Buckle was a member of Guernsey's squad for the Regional Finals of the 2018–19 ICC T20 World Cup Europe Qualifier tournament in Guernsey. He played in Guernsey's opening match of the Regional Finals, also against Jersey, on 15 June 2019.
