= Thomas Veillard =

Guernsey cricketer (born 1996)

Personal information
- Full name: Thomas Charlton Wallace Veillard
- Born: 27 December 1996 (age 29); Saint Peter Port, Guernsey
- Batting: Right-handed
- Bowling: Left-arm Orthodox

International information
- National side: Guernsey
- T20I debut (cap 13): 1 June 2019 v Jersey
- Last T20I: 20 June 2019 v Denmark

Career statistics
Competition	T20I
Matches	4
Runs scored	11
Batting average	11.00
100s/50s	0/0
Top score	8
Balls bowled	96
Wickets	4
Bowling average	23.25
5 wickets in innings	0
10 wickets in match	0
Best bowling	1/15
Catches/stumpings	1/–
- Source: Cricinfo, 26 May 2026

Thomas Veillard (born 27 December 1996) is a cricketer who plays for Guernsey. In May 2019, he was named in Guernsey's squad for the 2019 T20 Inter-Insular Cup. He made his Twenty20 International (T20I) debut for Guernsey against Jersey on 1 June 2019. The same month, he was named in Guernsey's squad for the Regional Finals of the 2018–19 ICC T20 World Cup Europe Qualifier tournament in Guernsey. He played in Guernsey's second match of the Regional Finals, against Germany, on 15 June 2019.
