= Ben Stevens (cricketer) =

Jersey cricketer (born 1992)

Personal information
- Full name: Benjamin David Hodfinger Stevens
- Born: 5 May 1992 (age 34); Hong Kong
- Batting: Left-handed
- Bowling: Left-arm orthodox spin
- Role: All-rounder

International information
- National side: Jersey
- Only ODI (cap 14): 5 April 2023 v United Arab Emirates
- T20I debut (cap 10): 31 May 2019 v Guernsey
- Last T20I: 14 July 2022 v Singapore

Career statistics
Competition	ODI	T20I	LA
Matches	1	20	11
Runs scored	1	327	195
Batting average	1.00	17.21	19.50
100s/50s	0/0	0/0	0/0
Top score	1	44	43
Balls bowled	18	267	422
Wickets	0	13	9
Bowling average	–	21.92	31.00
5 wickets in innings	0	0	0
10 wickets in match	0	0	0
Best bowling	–	3/17	3/24
Catches/stumpings	0/–	18/–	4/–
- Source: ESPNcricinfo, 25 May 2026

Benjamin David Hodfinger Stevens (born 5 May 1992) is a retired Jersey international cricketer. In 2014 he played in the 2014 ICC World Cricket League Division Four. He was a member of the Jersey squad for the 2015 ICC World Twenty20 Qualifier tournament.

== Career ==
Stevens studied Spanish at Durham University, where he also competed for Durham MCCU. In September 2017, he took the most wickets for Jersey in the 2017 ICC World Cricket League Division Five tournament, with a total of fourteen dismissals in five matches.

In April 2018, he was named in Jersey's squad for the 2018 ICC World Cricket League Division Four tournament in Malaysia. He was named as the player to watch in the squad ahead of the tournament. He was the leading run-scorer for Jersey in the tournament, with 253 runs in six matches, and the leading wicket-taker for his side, with thirteen dismissals. The International Cricket Council (ICC) named him as the player of the tournament.

In August 2018, he was named in Jersey's squad for the 2018–19 ICC World Twenty20 Europe Qualifier tournament in the Netherlands. He was the leading wicket-taker in Group B of the tournament, with fourteen dismissals in six matches.

In May 2019, he was named in Jersey's squad for the 2019 T20 Inter-Insular Cup against Guernsey. He made his Twenty20 International (T20I) debut for Jersey against Guernsey on 31 May 2019. The same month, he was named in Jersey's squad for the Regional Finals of the 2018–19 ICC T20 World Cup Europe Qualifier tournament in Guernsey.

In September 2019, he was named in Jersey's squad for the 2019 ICC T20 World Cup Qualifier tournament in the United Arab Emirates. In November 2019, he was named in Jersey's squad for the Cricket World Cup Challenge League B tournament in Oman. He made his List A debut, for Jersey against Uganda, on 2 December 2019.

In March 2023, he was named in Jersey's squad for the 2023 Cricket World Cup Qualifier Play-off. He made his One Day International (ODI) debut for Jersey on 5 April 2023, against the United Arab Emirates. He soon announced his retirement from international cricket and played his final match in the Inter-Insular 50-over match on 2 September.
