= Corey Bisson =

Jersey cricketer (born 1993)

Personal information
- Full name: Corey Peter Frank Bisson
- Born: 19 June 1993 (age 33); Jersey
- Batting: Right-handed
- Bowling: Right-arm medium

International information
- National side: Jersey
- T20I debut (cap 1): 31 May 2019 v Guernsey
- Last T20I: 27 October 2019 v Oman

Career statistics
Competition	T20I	LA
Matches	14	5
Runs scored	226	81
Batting average	18.83	27.00
100s/50s	0/1	0/1
Top score	54	58*
Balls bowled	–	18
Wickets	–	1
Bowling average	–	16.00
5 wickets in innings	–	0
10 wickets in match	–	0
Best bowling	–	1/9
Catches/stumpings	3/–	5/–
- Source: ESPNcricinfo, 25 May 2026

Corey Bisson (born 19 June 1993) is a cricketer who plays for Jersey. In 2014 he played in the 2014 ICC World Cricket League Division Four. He was part of the Jersey squad for the 2015 ICC World Twenty20 Qualifier tournament and for the 2016 ICC World Cricket League Division Four matches held in Los Angeles. At the Division Four tournament, he was the leading run-scorer, with a total of 242.

In April 2018, he was named in Jersey's squad for the 2018 ICC World Cricket League Division Four tournament in Malaysia. In August 2018, he was named in Jersey's squad for the 2018–19 ICC World Twenty20 Europe Qualifier tournament in the Netherlands.

In May 2019, he was named in Jersey's squad for the 2019 T20 Inter-Insular Cup against Guernsey. He made his Twenty20 International (T20I) debut for Jersey against Guernsey on 31 May 2019. The same month, he was named in Jersey's squad for the Regional Finals of the 2018–19 ICC T20 World Cup Europe Qualifier tournament in Guernsey.

In September 2019, he was named in Jersey's squad for the 2019 ICC T20 World Cup Qualifier tournament in the United Arab Emirates. In November 2019, he was named in Jersey's squad for the Cricket World Cup Challenge League B tournament in Oman. He made his List A debut, for Jersey against Uganda, on 2 December 2019.
