= William Robertson (Jersey cricketer) =

Jersey cricketer (born 1998)

Personal information
- Full name: William J. R. Robertson
- Born: 16 July 1998 (age 28); Perth, Western Australia
- Batting: Left-handed
- Bowling: Right-arm medium

International information
- National side: Jersey
- T20I debut (cap 9): 31 May 2019 v Guernsey
- Last T20I: 11 October 2019 v Qatar

Domestic team information
- Years: Team
- 2018–2019: Oxford MCCU

Career statistics
Competition	T20I	FC
Matches	6	3
Runs scored	1	8
Batting average	–	8.00
100s/50s	0/0	0/0
Top score	1*	8*
Balls bowled	109	350
Wickets	3	6
Bowling average	33.66	36.50
5 wickets in innings	0	0
10 wickets in match	0	0
Best bowling	1/7	3/32
Catches/stumpings	0/–	0/–
- Source: Cricinfo, 25 May 2026

William Robertson (born 16 July 1998) is an English cricketer who plays for Jersey. He made his first-class debut on 1 April 2018 for Oxford MCCU against Kent as part of the Marylebone Cricket Club University fixtures.

In April 2018, he was named in Jersey's squad for the 2018 ICC World Cricket League Division Four tournament in Malaysia. In May 2019, he was named in Jersey's squad for the 2019 T20 Inter-Insular Cup against Guernsey. He made his Twenty20 International (T20I) debut for Jersey against Guernsey on 31 May 2019. The same month, he was named in Jersey's squad for the Regional Finals of the 2018–19 ICC T20 World Cup Europe Qualifier tournament in Guernsey.

In September 2019, he was named in Jersey's squad for the 2019 ICC T20 World Cup Qualifier tournament in the United Arab Emirates. In November 2019, he was named in Jersey's squad for the Cricket World Cup Challenge League B tournament in Oman.
