= William Peatfield =

Guernsey cricketer (born 1990)

Will Peatfield
Personal information
- Full name: William Alexander Peatfield
- Born: 6 December 1990 (age 35); Saint Peter Port, Guernsey
- Batting: Right-handed
- Bowling: Right-arm Medium

International information
- National side: Guernsey
- T20I debut (cap 8): 31 May 2019 v Jersey
- Last T20I: 31 July 2022 v France

Career statistics
Competition	T20I
Matches	21
Runs scored	31
Batting average	15.50
100s/50s	0/0
Top score	12*
Balls bowled	450
Wickets	29
Bowling average	15.75
5 wickets in innings	0
10 wickets in match	0
Best bowling	4/22
Catches/stumpings	1/–
- Source: Cricinfo, 26 May 2026

William Peatfield (born 6 December 1990) is a cricketer who plays for Guernsey. He played in the 2014 ICC World Cricket League Division Five tournament. In May 2019, he was named in Guernsey's squad for the 2019 T20 Inter-Insular Cup. He made his Twenty20 International (T20I) debut for Guernsey against Jersey on 31 May 2019. The same month, he was named in Guernsey's squad for the Regional Finals of the 2018–19 ICC T20 World Cup Europe Qualifier tournament in Guernsey.
