= Nick Greenwood (cricketer) =

Jersey cricketer (born 1999)

Nicholas Greenwood
Personal information
- Full name: Nicholas Anthony Greenwood
- Born: 21 October 1999 (age 27); St Helier, Jersey
- Batting: Right-handed
- Bowling: Right-arm off break
- Role: Batter

International information
- National side: Jersey
- ODI debut (cap 3): 27 March 2023 v Canada
- Last ODI: 5 April 2023 v United Arab Emirates
- ODI shirt no.: 21
- T20I debut (cap 15): 9 October 2019 v Qatar
- Last T20I: 23 May 2026 v Guernsey
- T20I shirt no.: 21

Domestic team information
- Years: Team
- 2021/22–present: Wellington (squad no. 21)

Career statistics
Competition	ODI	T20I	FC	LA
Matches	5	42	26	55
Runs scored	94	1,115	1,357	1,667
Batting average	18.80	29.34	27.69	30.87
100s/50s	0/1	0/5	2/7	4/11
Top score	59	86*	143	141
Balls bowled	–	384	661	813
Wickets	–	18	7	30
Bowling average	–	21.66	69.42	19.03
5 wickets in innings	–	0	0	1
10 wickets in match	–	0	0	0
Best bowling	–	3/8	3/40	5/38
Catches/stumpings	4/–	17/–	13/–	23/–
- Source: ESPNcricinfo, 25 May 2026

Nicholas Anthony Greenwood (born 21 October 1999) is an international cricketer who plays for Jersey. In domestic cricket, he plays for Wellington.

== Career ==
Greenwood was born in Jersey, and his family moved to New Zealand when he was two years old. He made his Jersey debut in the annual 50-over Inter-Insular Cup match against Guernsey on 31 August 2019, scoring 53 in a five-wicket win.

In September 2019, Greenwood was named in Jersey's Twenty20 International (T20I) squads for the series against Qatar and the 2019 ICC T20 World Cup Qualifier tournament in the United Arab Emirates. He made his T20I debut for Jersey, against Qatar, on 9 October 2019.

In November 2019, he was named in Jersey's squad for the Cricket World Cup Challenge League B tournament in Oman. He made his List A debut against Uganda, on 2 December 2019. Four days later, in the match against Italy, Greenwood scored his first century in List A cricket.

In December 2020, he was named in Wellington's squad to play in the 2020–21 Ford Trophy in New Zealand. He made his first-class debut on 31 October 2021, for Wellington in the 2021–22 Plunket Shield season.

In March 2023, he was named in Jersey's squad for the 2023 Cricket World Cup Qualifier Play-off. He made his One Day International (ODI) debut on 27 March 2023, for Jersey against Canada in that tournament.

During the 2024 Men's T20I Inter-Insular Series against Guernsey, Greenwood registered the highest individual score of the competition, smashing 85 off 50 balls, including three sixes and nine fours, in the opening match to help Jersey to a 2–1 win.

In the opening match of the 2024–25 ICC Men's T20 World Cup Europe Qualifier in Germany in July 2024, Greenwood made 85 not out against Serbia as Jersey scored their highest T20I total to date, racking up 233 for 3. He also recorded career-best bowling figures of 3/8 as the islanders' won by 165 runs.

In September 2024 he was named in Jersey's 14-player squad for the 2024 Cricket World Cup Challenge League A in Kenya. Greenwood took his first five-wicket haul in List A cricket in the islanders' match against Qatar, bagging a player-of-the-match winning 5/38 in a 168-run victory.

He was named in the Jersey squad for the 2025 Men's T20 World Cup Europe Regional Final. In their final match of the tournament, Greenwood top-scored for the islanders with 49 as they defeated Scotland.

In February 2026, Greenwood made his maiden first-class century, scoring 143 for Wellington against Central Districts in the Plunkett Shield, before compiling his second ton at this level with 103 in the club's next match against Canterbury.

He was included in the Jersey squad for the 2026 Men's T20 World Cup Europe Sub-regional Qualifier A in Cyprus. During their final group match against Croatia, Greenwood scored 66 from 24 balls, including hitting two 4s and seven 6s, in a 109 run win as they secured a place in the tournament final.

Greenwood made 102 off 92 balls, an innings which included four 6s and six 4s, for Jersey in a 50 over match against the United Arab Emirates at Grainville on 27 July 2026.

== Criminal convictions ==
Greenwood pleaded guilty to charges of driving without insurance, failing to provide a specimen for analysis and failing to comply with traffic directions at Jersey Magistrates Court on 24 June 2025. The court was told the offences took place in the early hours of 8 June 2025. An interim driving ban was imposed with his sentencing adjourned until 29 July 2025. At that hearing, Greenwood was given a 130 hour community service order and fined £1,000 fine as well as being disqualified from driving for 36 months, after which he will have to take a Jersey driving test before being allowed to get back behind the wheel of a vehicle on the island's roads.
