= Rhys Palmer (cricketer) =

Jersey cricketer (born 1996)

Personal information
- Full name: Rhys John George Palmer
- Born: 22 February 1996 (age 30); Jersey
- Batting: Right-handed
- Bowling: Right-arm offbreak

International information
- National side: Jersey
- T20I debut (cap 13): 1 June 2019 v Guernsey
- Last T20I: 17 July 2022 v Singapore

Career statistics
Competition	T20I
Matches	10
Runs scored	11
Batting average	–
100s/50s	0/0
Top score	5*
Balls bowled	162
Wickets	7
Bowling average	23.71
5 wickets in innings	0
10 wickets in match	0
Best bowling	2/21
Catches/stumpings	2/–
- Source: Cricinfo, 25 May 2026

Rhys Palmer (born 22 January 1996) is a professional cricketer who plays for Jersey. He played in the 2016 ICC World Cricket League Division Five tournament and the 2016 ICC World Cricket League Division Four matches held in Los Angeles. In August 2018, he was named in Jersey's squad for the 2018–19 ICC World Twenty20 Europe Qualifier tournament in the Netherlands.

In May 2019, he was named in Jersey's squad for the 2019 T20 Inter-Insular Cup against Guernsey. The same month, he was named in Jersey's squad for the Regional Finals of the 2018–19 ICC T20 World Cup Europe Qualifier tournament in Guernsey. He made his Twenty20 International (T20I) debut for Jersey against Guernsey on 1 June 2019.

In September 2019, he was named in Jersey's squad for the 2019 ICC T20 World Cup Qualifier tournament in the United Arab Emirates. In November 2019, he was named in Jersey's squad for the Cricket World Cup Challenge League B tournament in Oman.

In October 2021, Palmer was named in Jersey's T20I squad for the Regional Final of the 2021 ICC Men's T20 World Cup Europe Qualifier tournament.
