= Elliot Miles =

Jersey cricketer (born 1997)

Personal information
- Full name: Eliot JB Miles
- Born: 26 June 1997 (age 29); St Helier, Jersey
- Batting: Right-handed
- Bowling: Left-arm orthodox spin

International information
- National side: Jersey
- ODI debut (cap 7): 27 March 2023 v Canada
- Last ODI: 30 March 2023 v Namibia
- T20I debut (cap 7): 31 May 2019 v Guernsey
- Last T20I: 17 July 2022 v Singapore

Career statistics
Competition	ODI	T20I	LA
Matches	4	33	18
Runs scored	2	36	24
Batting average	2.00	7.20	6.00
100s/50s	0/0	0/0	0/0
Top score	1*	16	8*
Balls bowled	174	642	798
Wickets	4	40	22
Bowling average	41.25	17.40	28.40
5 wickets in innings	0	0	0
10 wickets in match	0	0	0
Best bowling	2/32	3/10	4/8
Catches/stumpings	0/–	6/–	3/–
- Source: Cricinfo, 25 May 2026

Elliot Miles (born 26 June 1997) is a Jersey cricketer. He was named in Jersey's squad for the 2017 ICC World Cricket League Division Five tournament in South Africa. He played in Jersey's opening fixture, against Vanuatu, on 3 September 2017.

He was a member of Jersey's squad for the 2018 ICC World Cricket League Division Four tournament in Malaysia. In August 2018, he was named in Jersey's squad for the 2018–19 ICC World Twenty20 Europe Qualifier tournament in the Netherlands.

In May 2019, he was named in Jersey's squad for the 2019 T20 Inter-Insular Cup against Guernsey. He made his Twenty20 International (T20I) debut for Jersey against Guernsey on 31 May 2019. The same month, he was named in Jersey's squad for the Regional Finals of the 2018–19 ICC T20 World Cup Europe Qualifier tournament in Guernsey.

In September 2019, he was named in Jersey's squad for the 2019 ICC T20 World Cup Qualifier tournament in the United Arab Emirates. In November 2019, he was named in Jersey's squad for the Cricket World Cup Challenge League B tournament in Oman. He made his List A debut, for Jersey against Uganda, on 2 December 2019.

In October 2021, Miles was named in Jersey's T20I squad for the Regional Final of the 2021 ICC Men's T20 World Cup Europe Qualifier tournament.

In March 2023, he was named in Jersey's squad for the 2023 Cricket World Cup Qualifier Play-off. He made his One Day International (ODI) debut on 27 March 2023, for Jersey against Canada in that tournament.
