= Lucas Barker =

Guernsey cricketer (born 1995)

Personal information
- Full name: Lucas Barker
- Born: 23 June 1995 (age 31); Colne, Lancashire, England
- Batting: Right-handed

International information
- National side: Guernsey
- T20I debut (cap 1): 31 May 2019 v Jersey
- Last T20I: 23 May 2026 v Jersey

Career statistics
| Competition | T20I |
|---|---|
| Matches | 22 |
| Runs scored | 174 |
| Batting average | 9.66 |
| 100s/50s | 0/0 |
| Top score | 25 |
| Balls bowled | – |
| Wickets | – |
| Bowling average | – |
| 5 wickets in innings | – |
| 10 wickets in match | – |
| Best bowling | / |
| Catches/stumpings | 4/– |
- Source: ESPNcricinfo, 26 May 2026

Lucas Barker (born 23 June 1995) is a cricketer who plays for Guernsey. He played in the 2014 ICC World Cricket League Division Five tournament.

In May 2019, Barker was named in Guernsey's squad for the 2019 T20 Inter-Insular Cup, and made his Twenty20 International (T20I) debut for Guernsey against Jersey on 31 May 2019. The same month, he was named in Guernsey's squad for the Regional Finals of the 2018–19 ICC T20 World Cup Europe Qualifier tournament in Guernsey.
