= Luke Le Tissier =

Guernsey cricketer (born 1996)

Personal information
- Born: 16 July 1996 (age 30); Vale, Guernsey
- Batting: Right-handed
- Bowling: Right-arm Off break

International information
- National side: Guernsey
- T20I debut (cap 6): 31 May 2019 v Jersey
- Last T20I: 8 July 2023 v Jersey

Career statistics
Competition	T20I
Matches	20
Runs scored	184
Batting average	11.50
100s/50s	0/0
Top score	37
Balls bowled	264
Wickets	17
Bowling average	15.94
5 wickets in innings	0
10 wickets in match	0
Best bowling	3/17
Catches/stumpings	2/–
- Source: Cricinfo, 26 May 2026

Luke Le Tissier (born 16 July 1996) is a cricketer who plays for Guernsey. He played in the 2014 ICC World Cricket League Division Five tournament. In May 2019, he was named in Guernsey's squad for the 2019 T20 Inter-Insular Cup. He made his Twenty20 International (T20I) debut for Guernsey against Jersey on 31 May 2019. The same month, he was named in Guernsey's squad for the Regional Finals of the 2018–19 ICC T20 World Cup Europe Qualifier tournament in Guernsey.
