= Harrison Carlyon =

Jersey cricketer (born 2001)

Personal information
- Full name: Harrison Lee Carlyon
- Born: 23 January 2001 (age 25); Jersey
- Batting: Right-handed
- Bowling: Right-arm off break
- Role: All-rounder

International information
- National side: Jersey
- ODI debut (cap 1): 27 March 2023 v Canada
- Last ODI: 30 March 2023 v Namibia
- T20I debut (cap 12): 1 June 2019 v Guernsey
- Last T20I: 23 May 2026 v Guernsey

Career statistics
Competition	ODI	T20I	LA
Matches	5	50	34
Runs scored	143	1,079	1,132
Batting average	28.60	23.17	34.30
100s/50s	0/1	1/6	0/10
Top score	85	110	96
Balls bowled	180	495	900
Wickets	2	26	22
Bowling average	70.50	18.65	25.40
5 wickets in innings	0	0	1
10 wickets in match	0	0	0
Best bowling	2/38	3/14	5/13
Catches/stumpings	0/0	10/–	6/–
- Source: ESPNcricinfo, 4 November 2026

Harrison Carlyon (born 23 January 2001) is a Jersey international cricketer. He is an all-rounder, who bats right-handed and bowls right-arm off break. Carlyon is the first Jersey player to score a century in a T20I.

== Career ==
In October 2016 Carlyon was selected for Jersey's squad for the 2016 ICC World Cricket League Division Four in Los Angeles. He played in Jersey's first fixture of the tournament against Oman. At the age of fifteen, he became the youngest player to represent Jersey in an international cricket match, breaking the previous record held by teammate Jonty Jenner.

In the final match for Jersey in the Division Four tournament, the fifth-place playoff against Italy, he played alongside his father and team manager, Tony Carlyon. Injuries in the Jersey team forced his father to play, becoming the first father and son to play together in an international match for Jersey.

Carlyon was a member of Jersey's squad for the 2018 ICC World Cricket League Division Four tournament in Malaysia. In August 2018, he was named in Jersey's squad for the 2018–19 ICC World Twenty20 Europe Qualifier tournament in the Netherlands.

In May 2019, he was named in Jersey's squad for the 2019 T20 Inter-Insular Cup against Guernsey. The same month, he was named in Jersey's squad for the Regional Finals of the 2018–19 ICC T20 World Cup Europe Qualifier tournament in Guernsey. He made his Twenty20 International (T20I) debut for Jersey against Guernsey on 1 June 2019.

In July 2019, Carlyon captained Jersey's under-19 team for the Under-19 Cricket World Cup qualification tournament. On 31 July 2019, in Jersey's nine wicket win against France, Carlyon scored 107 runs.

In September 2019, he was named in Jersey's squad for the 2019 ICC T20 World Cup Qualifier tournament in the United Arab Emirates. In November 2019, he was named in Jersey's squad for the Cricket World Cup Challenge League B tournament in Oman. He made his List A debut, for Jersey against Uganda, on 2 December 2019.

In October 2021, Carlyon was named in Jersey's T20I squad for the Regional Final of the 2021 ICC Men's T20 World Cup Europe Qualifier tournament.

In March 2023, he was named in Jersey's squad for the 2023 Cricket World Cup Qualifier Play-off. He made his One Day International (ODI) debut on 27 March 2023, for Jersey against Canada in that tournament.

On 7 July 2024, Carlyon became the first Jersey player to score a century in a T20I when he made 110 off 57 balls against Serbia during the 2024–25 ICC Men's T20 World Cup Europe Qualifier at Bayer Uerdingen Cricket Ground, Krefeld, Germany.

Carlyon top scored for Jersey with 73 off 100 balls including seven 4s as they defeated Guernsey in the Inter-Insular Trophy one-day match on 7 September 2024. The performance earned him the player of the match award. Later that month he was named in Jersey's 14-player squad for the 2024 Cricket World Cup Challenge League A in Kenya. During the tournament Carlyon made two half-centuries, scoring 89 against Qatar and 59 against Denmark.

He was included in the Jersey squad for the 2025 Men's T20 World Cup Europe Regional Final and was named player of the match in the islanders' win over Guernsey, scoring 63 off 50 balls, which included hitting one 6 and six 4s, and taking two wickets for eight runs from his four overs.

Carlyon was selected in the Jersey squad for the 2026 Men's T20 World Cup Europe Sub-regional Qualifier A in Cyprus. Opening the batting during his team's third group match against France, he top scored with 57 not out from 42 balls, including hitting six 4s and one 6, as they won by eight-wickets. The next day, in their last group match against Croatia, Carlyon again top scored, making 83 off 42 balls, an innings which featured five 4s and seven 6s, and shared in a 142 run opening partnership with Patrick Gouge, as Jersey secured a 109 run victory to clinch a place in the tournament final.

He was included in the Jersey squad for the Cricket World Cup Challenge League A final round in Kenya in October 2026. Carlyon made scores of 59 and 49 as Jersey defeated Uganda A in two warm-up matches for the event. His most impactful contribution at the tournament itself was scoring 50 in the islanders' 123-run win over the hosts, Kenya, in their second match.
