= David Hooper (cricketer) =

Guerney cricketer (born 1991)

Personal information
- Born: 31 March 1991 (age 35)
- Batting: Right-handed
- Bowling: Right-hand medium

International information
- National side: Guernsey
- T20I debut (cap 5): 31 May 2019 v Jersey
- Last T20I: 15 August 2023 v Germany

Career statistics
Competition	T20I
Matches	24
Runs scored	129
Batting average	16.12
100s/50s	0/0
Top score	19*
Balls bowled	473
Wickets	19
Bowling average	31.15
5 wickets in innings	0
10 wickets in match	0
Best bowling	3/5
Catches/stumpings	7/–
- Source: Cricinfo, 26 May 2026

David Hooper (born 31 March 1991) is a cricketer who plays for Guernsey. He played in the 2014 ICC World Cricket League Division Five tournament. In May 2015 he participated in the 2015 ICC Europe Division One tournament.

A right-hand fast-medium bowler, he played in the 2016 ICC World Cricket League Division Five tournament. In September 2017, he took the most wickets for Guernsey in the 2017 ICC World Cricket League Division Five tournament, with a total of fourteen dismissals in five matches.

In May 2019, he was named in Guernsey's squad for the 2019 T20 Inter-Insular Cup. He made his Twenty20 International (T20I) debut for Guernsey against Jersey on 31 May 2019. The same month, he was named in Guernsey's squad for the Regional Finals of the 2018–19 ICC T20 World Cup Europe Qualifier tournament in Guernsey.
