= Jake Dunford =

Jersey cricketer (born 1994)

Personal information
- Full name: Jake Samuel Edward Dunford
- Born: 24 June 1994 (age 32)
- Batting: Right-handed
- Role: Wicket-keeper

International information
- National side: Jersey
- ODI debut (cap 2): 27 March 2023 v Canada
- Last ODI: 30 March 2023 v Namibia
- T20I debut (cap 3): 31 May 2019 v Guernsey
- Last T20I: 11 July 2025 v Scotland

Domestic team information
- Years: Team
- 2016: Durham MCCU

Career statistics
Competition	ODI	T20I	FC	LA
Matches	5	39	2	35
Runs scored	10	161	1	267
Batting average	2.50	20.12	0.50	14.05
100s/50s	0/0	0/0	0/0	0/0
Top score	4	45*	1	35
Catches/stumpings	2/0	18/15	2/1	36/9
- Source: Cricinfo, 5 November 2026

Jake Dunford (born 24 June 1994) is a Jersey international cricketer. He played in the 2016 ICC World Cricket League Division Five tournament. Prior to the World Cricket League tournament, he made his first-class debut for Durham MCCU against Gloucestershire on 31 March 2016.

== Career ==
Dunford played for Jersey in the 2016 ICC World Cricket League Division Four matches held in Los Angeles, United States.

He is currently the ICC World Cricket League record holder for the most dismissals in a single tournament, with 21 (18 catches and 3 stumpings) in the ICC WCL Division 5 tournament. This broke the previous record of 19 shared by Jeroen Smits of the Netherlands (at the 2009 World Cup Qualifier) and Denzil Sequeira of Botswana (at the 2013 WCL Division Seven).

In April 2018, he was named in Jersey's squad for the 2018 ICC World Cricket League Division Four tournament in Malaysia. In August 2018, he was named in Jersey's squad for the 2018–19 ICC World Twenty20 Europe Qualifier tournament in the Netherlands.

In May 2019, he was named in Jersey's squad for the 2019 T20 Inter-Insular Cup against Guernsey. He made his Twenty20 International (T20I) debut for Jersey against Guernsey on 31 May 2019. The same month, he was named in Jersey's squad for the Regional Finals of the 2018–19 ICC T20 World Cup Europe Qualifier tournament in Guernsey.

In September 2019, he was named in Jersey's squad for the 2019 ICC T20 World Cup Qualifier tournament in the United Arab Emirates. Ahead of the tournament, the International Cricket Council (ICC) named him as the player to watch in Jersey's squad. In November 2019, he was named in Jersey's squad for the Cricket World Cup Challenge League B tournament in Oman. He made his List A debut against Uganda, on 2 December 2019.

In October 2021, Dunford was named in Jersey's T20I squad for the Regional Final of the 2021 ICC Men's T20 World Cup Europe Qualifier tournament.

In March 2023, he was named in Jersey's squad for the 2023 Cricket World Cup Qualifier Play-off. He made his One Day International (ODI) debut on 27 March 2023, for Jersey against Canada in that tournament.

In September 2024 he was named in Jersey's 14-player squad for the 2024 Cricket World Cup Challenge League A in Kenya.

Dunford was included in the Jersey squad for the 2025 Men's T20 World Cup Europe Regional Final. He was also part of the Jersey squad at the Cricket World Cup Challenge League A final round in Kenya in October 2026.
