= Farmers Cricket Club Ground =

Cricket ground in Jersey

- Interactive map of Farmers Cricket Club Ground

Ground information
- Location: Saint Martin, Jersey.
- Coordinates: 49°13′10″N 2°03′38″W
- Establishment: 2005

International information
- First men's T20I: 7 July 2023: Jersey v Guernsey
- Last men's T20I: 8 July 2023: Jersey v Guernsey

Team information
Farmers Cricket Club	(2005 – present)
- As of 18 July 2023; Source: CricketArchive

Farmers Cricket Club Ground is a cricket ground in Saint Martin, Jersey. It was opened in 2005 by Geoffrey Boycott and Mike Gatting and has hosted ICC World Cricket League matches. The ground is the home of the Farmers Cricket Club and the Jersey national cricket team.

== History ==
The Farmers Cricket Club Ground was built after Jersey farmer Jim Perchard decided to turn his potato farm into a cricket field. Work on the ground started in 2003, and took 18 months. The ground was opened in 2005 by former England cricketers Geoffrey Boycott and Mike Gatting, and its first recorded international match was in July 2007 between Belgium Under-19s and France Under-19s. The ground hosted five matches during the 2008 ICC World Cricket League Division Five, including one Jersey match against Botswana, which Jersey won by 7 wickets. In 2009, the Farmers Cricket Club Ground hosted a match between Guerney Under-19s and Ireland under-19s, as part of the 2009 European Under-19 Championships. Ireland scored 281, in an innings where Andrew Balbirnie top-scored for the Irish with 83 and 55 extras were conceded. In reply, Guernsey were bowled out for 49.

In 2013, the ground hosted four matches in the 2013 ICC World Cricket League Division Six. In May 2014, the ground hosted a 50-over and a 20-over match between Jersey and the Marylebone Cricket Club; Jersey won the 50-over match by 7 wickets, and the 20-over match by 2 wickets on the final ball of the match. After the death of Phillip Hughes, Farmers Cricket Club groundsman Jimmy Perchard organised a row of bats outside the ground, and changed the ground's scorecard to 63*.

Between 21 and 28 May 2016, the Farmers Cricket Club Ground was one of three grounds that hosted the 2016 ICC World Cricket League Division Five in Jersey; the other two were Grainville Cricket Ground and FB Playing Fields. The Farmers Ground hosted five matches.

In 2019, Farmers Cricket Club Ground was voted into the top ten club cricket grounds in the United Kingdom, after international cricket agency CricX asked its followers to send the picture of their favourite pitches.
