= 2019 T20 Inter-Insular Cup =

	Guernsey	Jersey
- Dates: 31 May – 1 June 2019
Captains	Josh Butler	Charles Perchard

Twenty20 International series
- Results: Jersey won the 3-match series 3–0
Most runs	Matthew Stokes (78)	Nicholas Ferraby (94)
Most wickets	Nic Buckle (3); William Peatfield (3); Luke Le Tissier (3); David Hooper (3)	Elliot Miles (7)
- Player of the series: Dominic Blampied (Jer)

Guernsey cricket team hosted Jersey cricket team from 31 May to 1 June 2019 to contest the 2019 T20 Inter-Insular Cup, consisting of three Twenty20 International (T20I) matches. The series took place at two grounds in Guernsey: College Field in Saint Peter Port and King George V Sports Ground in Castel. The two sides had played an Inter-Insular match annually since 1950, generally as 50-over contests. A Twenty20 series was played for the first time in 2018, with Jersey winning the inaugural series 3–0.

Following the International Cricket Council's decision to grant T20I status to all matches played between Associate Members after 1 January 2019, this edition was the first to have this enhanced status. Both teams made their T20I debuts with fixtures providing part of their preparations for the European Regional Qualifying tournament for the 2019 ICC Men's T20 World Cup Qualifier. Jersey again won the series 3–0. The first match of the series was the thirteenth tied T20I match, and the ninth to be won by a Super Over. Jersey's Dominic Blampied was named player of the series after scoring 92 runs and taking 6 wickets.

On 31 May 2019, there was also a one-off Women's Twenty20 International (WT20I) fixture between the two women's teams. Guernsey won the one-off WT20I match by seven wickets. It was the first WT20I match for both teams.

On 31 August 2019, the men's teams played the traditional annual 50-over Inter-Insular Trophy match. This had been replaced by the T20 Cup series in 2018, but both formats will now be played each year with a separate trophy awarded.

== T20I series ==
=== Squads ===
Guernsey	Jersey
Josh Butler (c); Lucas Barker; Nic Buckle; Ben Ferbrache; David Hooper; Tom Kimber; Luke Le Tissier; Jordan Martel; Oliver Newey (wk); Luke Nussbaumer; William Peatfield; Anthony Stokes; Matthew Stokes; Thomas Veillard; Charles Vorster; Ashley Wright	Charles Perchard (c); Corey Bisson; Dominic Blampied; Harrison Carlyon; Jake Dunford (wk); Nicholas Ferraby; Anthony Hawkins-Kay; Jonty Jenner; Elliot Miles; Rhys Palmer; William Robertson; Ben Stevens; Julius Sumerauer

=== 1st T20I ===
31 May 2019
16:00 (D/N)
Scorecard

Jersey; 128/9 (20 overs)	v	Guernsey; 128/8 (20 overs)
Corey Bisson 26 (25); Nic Buckle 3/26 (4 overs)		Josh Butler 22 (25); Elliot Miles 3/17 (4 overs)

Match tied
(Jersey won the Super Over)
College Field, Saint Peter Port
Umpires: Neil Hall (Gue) and Martin Tolcher (Gue)
Player of the match: Dominic Blampied (Jer)

- Guernsey won the toss and elected to field.
- Lucas Barker, Nic Buckle, Josh Butler, Ben Ferbrache, David Hooper, Luke Le Tissier, Oliver Newey, William Peatfield, Anthony Stokes, Matthew Stokes, Ashley Wright (Gue), Corey Bisson, Dominic Blampied, Jake Dunford, Nicholas Ferraby, Anthony Hawkins-Kay, Jonty Jenner, Elliot Miles, Charles Perchard, William Robertson, Ben Stevens and Julius Sumerauer (Jer) all made their T20I debuts.

=== 2nd T20I ===
1 June 2019
10:30
Scorecard

Jersey; 164/3 (20 overs)	v	Guernsey; 123/9 (20 overs)
Nicholas Ferraby 81* (64); Anthony Stokes 1/28 (4 overs)		Josh Butler 38 (37); Charles Perchard 5/17 (4 overs)

Jersey won by 41 runs
King George V Sports Ground, Castel
Umpires: Neil Hall (Gue) and Richard Veillard (Gue)

- Guernsey won the toss and elected to field.
- Harrison Carlyon (Jer) made his T20I debut.
- Charles Perchard became the first bowler for Jersey to take a five-wicket haul in T20Is.

=== 3rd T20I ===
1 June 2019
14:30
Scorecard

Jersey; 171/6 (20 overs)	v	Guernsey; 95 (18.4 overs)
Harrison Carlyon 50 (33); Luke Le Tissier 2/18 (4 overs)		Matthew Stokes 28 (29); Dominic Blampied 4/20 (3.4 overs)

Jersey won by 76 runs
King George V Sports Ground, Castel
Umpires: Robin Stockton (Jer) and Simon Welch (Gue)
Player of the match: Dominic Blampied (Jer)

- Jersey won the toss and elected to bat.
- Luke Nussbaumer, Thomas Veillard, Charles Vorster (Gue) and Rhys Palmer (Jer) all made their T20I debuts.

== WT20I match ==
	Guernsey women	Jersey women
- Date: 31 May 2019
Captains	Hannah Eulemkamp (Note: Hannah Eulemkamp was announced as Guernsey's captain, but Francesca Bulpitt captained the side.)	Rosa Hill

Twenty20 International series
- Results: Guernsey women won the 1-match series 1–0
Most runs	Philippa Staheli (56)	Florrie Copley (39)
Most wickets	Katie Watson (2)	Florence Tanguy (1); Chloe Greechan (1)

=== Squads ===
Guernsey	Jersey
Hannah Eulemkamp (c); Francesca Bulpitt; Carrie Eddie (wk); Katrina Guilbert; Rebecca Hubbard; Claire Jennings; Lucy Le Page; Leigh Le Page; Jeanette Savage; Philippa Stahelin; Katie Watson; Samantha Whalley; Elizabeth Willcocks	Rosa Hill (c); Tea Brocklesby; Florrie Copley; Erin Gouge; Chloe Greechan; Lily Greig; Rose Heaney; Mia Maguire; Georgia Mallet (wk); Analise Merritt; Florence Tanguy; Grace Wetherall

=== Only WT20I ===
31 May 2019
12:00
Scorecard

Jersey; 114/4 (20 overs)	v	Guernsey; 115/3 (17.5 overs)
Florrie Copley 39* (45); Katie Watson 2/15 (4 overs)		Philippa Stahelin 56* (52); Florence Tanguy 1/19 (3 overs)

Guernsey won by 7 wickets
College Field, Saint Peter Port
Umpires: Jane Carpenter (Jer) and Simon Welch (Gue)
Player of the match: Philippa Stahelin (Gue)

- Guernsey won the toss and elected to field.
- Francesca Bulpitt, Carrie Eddie, Katrina Guilbert, Rebecca Hubbard, Claire Jennings, Leigh Le Page, Lucy Le Page, Jeanette Savage, Philippa Stahelin, Katie Watson, Elizabeth Willcocks (Gue), Tea Brocklesby, Florrie Copley, Erin Gouge, Chloe Greechan, Lily Greig, Rosa Hill, Mia Maguire, Georgia Mallet, Analise Merritt, Florence Tanguy and Grace Wetherall (Jer) all made their WT20I debuts.

== 50-over Inter-Insular Trophy ==
The T20I series was followed later in the year by a 50-over match played on 31 August 2019, which was the 67th annual Inter-Insular Trophy match between the two sides. The Trophy match had been replaced by the T20 Cup series in 2018, but both formats will now be played each year with a separate trophy awarded. Jersey won the rain-affected match by five-wickets to retain the Inter-Insular Trophy.

=== Squads ===
Guernsey	Jersey
Oliver Newey (c); Josh Butler; Lucas Barker; Nic Buckle; Ben Ferbrache; David Hooper; Tom Kirk; Luke Le Tissier; Jordan Martel; Jason Martin (wk); William Peatfield; Tim Ravenscroft; Matthew Stokes; Thomas Veillard	Charles Perchard (c); Daniel Birrell; Corey Bisson; Dominic Blampied; Harrison Carlyon (wk); Nicholas Ferraby; Nick Greenwood; Anthony Hawkins-Kay; Jonty Jenner; Elliot Miles; Rhys Palmer; William Robertson; Zak Tribe

=== Match ===
31 August 2019
10:45
Scorecard

Guernsey; 194 (49.5 overs)	v	Jersey; 179/5 (32.2 overs)
Matthew Stokes 74 (112); Rhys Palmer 4/32 (9.5 overs)		Corey Bisson 57 (64); William Peatfield 3/41 (8 overs)

Jersey won by 5 wickets (DLS method)
King George V Sports Ground, Castel
Umpires: Heath Kearns (Jer) and Richard Veillard (Gue)
Player of the match: Corey Bisson (Jer)

- Guernsey won the toss and elected to bat.
- Jersey were set a revised target of 177 runs to win from 40 overs due to rain.

== See also ==
- Inter-Insular cricket
- 2018 T20 Inter-Insular Cup
- 2022 Men's T20I Inter-Insular Series
