= King George V Sports Ground =

Cricket ground

- Interactive map of King George V Sports Ground

Ground information
- Location: Castel, Guernsey
- Coordinates: 49.4725°N 2.5740°W
- End names
- De Beauvoir End; Blancs Bois End

International information
- First men's T20I: 1 June 2019: Guernsey v Jersey
- Last men's T20I: 14 August 2025: Guernsey v Papua New Guinea
- First women's T20I: 24 June 2023: Guernsey v Jersey
- Last women's T20I: 5 July 2025: Guernsey v Jersey
- As of 28 August 2024; Source: Cricinfo

The King George V Sports Ground is a cricket ground in Castel, Guernsey. The venue hosted matches in the 2009 ICC World Cricket League Division Seven tournament, and in the Regional Finals of the 2018–19 ICC World Twenty20 Europe Qualifier tournament in June 2019. On 30 May 2020, the ground hosted the first match in the British Isles after lockdown restrictions were eased during the COVID-19 pandemic.

== International record ==
=== Twenty20 International five-wicket hauls ===
One T20I five-wicket haul has been taken at this venue.

#	Figures	Player	Country	Innings	Opponent	Date	Result
1	5/17	Charles Perchard	Jersey	2	Guernsey	1 June 2019	Won
