= Julius Sumerauer =

Jersey cricketer (born 2001)

Personal information
- Full name: Julius Thomas Silvester Sumerauer
- Born: 12 February 2001 (age 25); Ngamiland, Botswana
- Batting: Right-handed
- Bowling: Right-arm fast medium

International information
- National side: Jersey
- ODI debut (cap 9): 27 March 2023 v Canada
- Last ODI: 30 March 2023 v Namibia
- T20I debut (cap 11): 31 May 2019 v Guernsey
- Last T20I: 23 May 2026 v Guernsey

Career statistics
| Competition | ODI | T20I | LA |
|---|---|---|---|
| Matches | 5 | 49 | 34 |
| Runs scored | 97 | 424 | 461 |
| Batting average | 24.25 | 15.14 | 21.95 |
| 100s/50s | 0/0 | 0/1 | 0/0 |
| Top score | 35 | 54* | 41 |
| Balls bowled | 294 | 859 | 1,501 |
| Wickets | 12 | 49 | 52 |
| Bowling average | 22.27 | 22.04 | 22.90 |
| 5 wickets in innings | 0 | 0 | 1 |
| 10 wickets in match | 0 | 0 | 0 |
| Best bowling | 4/51 | 4/21 | 6/32 |
| Catches/stumpings | 1/– | 24/– | 19/– |
- Source: Cricinfo, 4 November 2026

Julius Sumerauer (born 12 February 2001) is a cricketer who plays for Jersey.

== Career ==
In May 2019, he was named in Jersey's squad for the 2019 T20 Inter-Insular Cup against Guernsey. He made his Twenty20 International (T20I) debut for Jersey against Guernsey on 31 May 2019. The same month, he was named in Jersey's squad for the Regional Finals of the 2018–19 ICC T20 World Cup Europe Qualifier tournament in Guernsey. He played in Jersey's third match of the Regional Finals, against Norway, on 16 June 2019.

Sumerauer was a member of the Jersey squad for the 2019 ICC T20 World Cup Qualifier tournament in the United Arab Emirates. In November 2019, he was named in Jersey's squad for the Cricket World Cup Challenge League B tournament in Oman. He made his List A debut, for Jersey against Uganda, on 2 December 2019.

In October 2021, Sumerauer was named in Jersey's T20I squad for the Regional Final of the 2021 ICC Men's T20 World Cup Europe Qualifier tournament. In June 2022, he was named in Jersey's squad for the 2022 Uganda Cricket World Cup Challenge League B tournament. On 20 May 2022, he made his maiden T20I half-century, scoring 54 not out from 32 balls against Guernsey in the opening match of that year's Inter-Insular Series On 21 June 2022, in Jersey's match against Italy, Sumerauer took his first five-wicket haul in List A cricket, with 6/32.

In March 2023, he was named in Jersey's squad for the 2023 Cricket World Cup Qualifier Play-off. He made his One Day International (ODI) debut on 27 March 2023, for Jersey against Canada in that tournament.

In September 2024, Sumerauer was named in Jersey's 14-player squad for the 2024 Cricket World Cup Challenge League A in Kenya.

Sumerauer was named the tournament Most Valuable Player as his club, Farmers, won the 2025 T10 European Cricket League, scoring 90 not out in their semi-final win over Skanderborg and then hitting 35 off 13 balls in the final as the Jersey team defeated Roma.

He was included in the Jersey squad for the 2025 Men's T20 World Cup Europe Regional Final.

Sumerauer was named in the Jersey squad for the 2026 Men's T20 World Cup Europe Sub-regional Qualifier A in Cyprus. He took 4/21 in his team's first group stage match against Switzerland in a nine-wicket win. In their second group game against the hosts Cyprus, Sumerauer was named man-of-the-match after top scoring with 43 and taking 3/29 as Jersey won by nine-wickets.

He was included in the Jersey squad for the Cricket World Cup Challenge League A final round in Kenya in October 2026. Promoted up the order to open the batting in their fourth match of the tournament against Denmark, Sumerauer scored 43 from 46 balls, including hitting six 4s and one 6, in a 72-run win. His best bowling performance at the event was taking 2/26 off 3.2 overs in Jersey's 34-run win over Qatar in their final match which was shortened to 24 overs per side due to rain.
