= Jonty Jenner =

Jersey cricketer (born 1997)

Personal information
- Full name: Jonty William Jenner
- Born: 4 December 1997 (age 28); Jersey
- Batting: Right-handed
- Bowling: Right-arm off break
- Role: Batsman

International information
- National side: Jersey (2014–present)
- ODI debut (cap 5): 27 March 2023 v Canada
- Last ODI: 5 April 2023 v UAE
- T20I debut (cap 6): 31 May 2019 v Guernsey
- Last T20I: 23 May 2026 v Guernsey

Domestic team information
- Years: Team
- 2017: Sussex
- 2024: Boca Raton Trailblazers

Career statistics
Competition	ODI	T20I	FC	LA
Matches	5	61	1	35
Runs scored	139	1,541	68	1,028
Batting average	27.80	32.10	68.00	35.44
100s/50s	0/1	0/8	0/1	1/7
Top score	76	96*	68	104*
Catches/stumpings	2/–	46/–	0/–	8/–
- Source: Cricinfo, 3 November 2026

Jonty William Jenner (born 4 December 1997) is a professional cricketer who plays for Jersey. On 7 July 2017, he was the substitute fielder for Stuart Broad during the first Test between England and South Africa.

== Career ==
In 2014 he played in the 2014 ICC World Cricket League Division Four tournament. Jenner was a member of the Jersey squad for the 2015 ICC World Twenty20 Qualifier tournament and for the 2016 ICC World Cricket League Division Four matches held in Los Angeles.

He made his first-class debut for Sussex against South Africa A on 14 June 2017, scoring 68 in his only innings.

In April 2018, he was named in Jersey's squad for the 2018 ICC World Cricket League Division Four tournament in Malaysia. In August 2018, he was named in Jersey's squad for the 2018–19 ICC World Twenty20 Europe Qualifier tournament in the Netherlands.

In May 2019, he was named in Jersey's squad for the 2019 T20 Inter-Insular Cup against Guernsey. He made his Twenty20 International (T20I) debut for Jersey against Guernsey on 31 May 2019. The same month, he was named in Jersey's squad for the Regional Finals of the 2018–19 ICC T20 World Cup Europe Qualifier tournament in Guernsey.

In September 2019, he was named in Jersey's squad for the 2019 ICC T20 World Cup Qualifier tournament in the United Arab Emirates. He was the leading run-scorer for Jersey in the tournament, with 170 runs in six matches. In November 2019, he was named in Jersey's squad for the Cricket World Cup Challenge League B tournament in Oman. He made his List A debut, for Jersey against Uganda, on 2 December 2019.

In October 2021, Jenner was named in Jersey's T20I squad for the Regional Final of the 2021 ICC Men's T20 World Cup Europe Qualifier tournament. His personal tournament highlight was scoring 96 not out off 66 balls, including 11 fours and two sixes, against Denmark in the final match as the islanders' won the competition.

In March 2023, he was named in Jersey's squad for the 2023 Cricket World Cup Qualifier Play-off. He made his One Day International (ODI) debut on 27 March 2023, for Jersey against Canada in that tournament. Three days later, Jenner compiled his maiden ODI half-century against Namibia, scoring 76.

Jenner played a major role as his club side, Old Victorians, finished runners-up at the fourth edition of the T10 European Cricket League held in Málaga, Spain, in March 2024. He hit three centuries and two scores in the 90s as he ended the 35-team tournament as top batter with 603 runs to his name.

In June 2024, Jenner scored 80 not out off 31 balls in the second match of the Men's T20I Inter-Insular Series against Guernsey and also captained the team in the third game as they secured a 2–1 series win.

His good form continued into the 2024–25 ICC Men's T20 World Cup Europe Qualifier in Germany in July 2024 as he smashed 67 off 30 balls, including hitting four sixes, during the group stage match against Switzerland.

With regular captain Charles Perchard unavailable, Jenner captained the Jersey squad in two one-day matches against Zimbabwe A Under 25s held at New Farnley Cricket Club in Leeds, England, in August 2024. Later that month, he played in the inaugural Max 60 Caribbean League in the Cayman Islands for the Boca Raton Trailblazers who were captained by former Australia batter David Warner.

The following month he was named in Jersey's 14-player squad for the 2024 Cricket World Cup Challenge League A in Kenya.

Jenner was included in the Jersey squad for the 2025 Men's T20 World Cup Europe Regional Final.

He was named in the Jersey squad for the 2026 Men's T20 World Cup Europe Sub-regional Qualifier A in Cyprus. During their final group match against Croatia, Jenner scored the fastest T20I half-century ever by a Jersey player, reaching the mark in just 16 balls and going on to finish 66 not out in a 109 run win as they secured a place in the tournament final.

Jenner was a member of the Jersey squad for the Cricket World Cup Challenge League A final round in Kenya in October 2026. He scored 72 off just 23 balls, including hitting two 4s and nine 6s, in Jersey's 172-run win over Papua New Guinea in their opening match at the Gymkhana Club Ground in Nairobi. Jenner followed this up with 81 from 53 balls as the islanders defeated Denmark by 72 runs in their fourth match of the tournament.
