= Ben Ferbrache =

Guernsey cricketer (born 1988)

Personal information
- Full name: Lee Benjamin Ferbrache
- Born: 18 March 1988 (age 38)
- Batting: Right-handed
- Bowling: Right-arm off break

International information
- National side: Guernsey
- T20I debut (cap 4): 31 May 2019 v Jersey
- Last T20I: 23 May 2026 v Jersey

Career statistics
Competition	T20I
Matches	41
Runs scored	328
Batting average	16.40
100s/50s	0/1
Top score	55
Balls bowled	–
Wickets	–
Bowling average	–
5 wickets in innings	–
10 wickets in match	–
Best bowling	–
Catches/stumpings	23/–
- Source: Cricinfo, 26 May 2026

Ben Ferbrache (born 18 March 1988) is a cricketer who plays for Guernsey. He played in the 2014 ICC World Cricket League Division Five tournament. In May 2015 he participated in the 2015 ICC Europe Division One tournament.

He played in the 2016 ICC World Cricket League Division Five tournament. In May 2019, he was named in Guernsey's squad for the 2019 T20 Inter-Insular Cup. He made his Twenty20 International (T20I) debut for Guernsey against Jersey on 31 May 2019. The same month, he was named in Guernsey's squad for the Regional Finals of the 2018–19 ICC T20 World Cup Europe Qualifier tournament in Guernsey.

In July 2025, Ferbrache became the first player to win 100 caps for Guernsey.
