= Charles Perchard =

Jersey cricketer (born 1992)

Personal information
- Full name: Charles Walter Perchard
- Born: 18 July 1992 (age 34); Jersey
- Nickname: Chuggy
- Batting: Right-handed
- Bowling: Right-arm medium

International information
- National side: Jersey (2010–present)
- ODI debut (cap 8): 27 March 2023 v Canada
- Last ODI: 5 April 2023 v UAE
- T20I debut (cap 8): 31 May 2019 v Guernsey
- Last T20I: 23 May 2026 v Guernsey

Career statistics
Competition	ODI	T20I	LA	T20
Matches	5	58	35	64
Runs scored	32	128	162	149
Batting average	32.00	10.66	20.25	10.64
100s/50s	0/0	0/0	0/0	0/0
Top score	16*	26*	37	26*
Balls bowled	270	1,158	1,357	1,230
Wickets	9	87	36	88
Bowling average	23.11	13.78	27.11	14.61
5 wickets in innings	0	1	0	1
10 wickets in match	0	0	0	0
Best bowling	3/38	5/17	3/23	5/17
Catches/stumpings	0/–	23/–	11/–	25/–
- Source: ESPNcricinfo, 5 November 2026

Charles Walter "Chuggy" Perchard (born 18 July 1992) is a Jersey international cricketer. He has captained the team since 2017.

== Career ==
In 2014 he played in the 2014 ICC World Cricket League Division Four. He was a member of the Jersey squad for the 2015 ICC World Twenty20 Qualifier tournament and for the 2016 ICC World Cricket League Division Four matches held in Los Angeles.

For the 2017 ICC World Cricket League Division Five in September 2017, he was named as captain of the squad. In April 2018, he was also named as the captain of Jersey's squad for the 2018 ICC World Cricket League Division Four tournament in Malaysia. In August 2018, he was named as the captain of the team for the 2018–19 ICC World Twenty20 Europe Qualifier tournament in the Netherlands.

In May 2019, he was named as the captain of Jersey's squad for the 2019 T20 Inter-Insular Cup against Guernsey. He made his Twenty20 International (T20I) debut for Jersey against Guernsey on 31 May 2019. In the second match of the T20 Inter-Insular Cup, Perchard became the first bowler for Jersey to take a five-wicket haul in T20Is, finishing with five wickets for seventeen runs. The same month, he was named as the captain of Jersey's squad for the Regional Finals of the 2018–19 ICC T20 World Cup Europe Qualifier tournament in Guernsey.

In September 2019, he was named as the captain of Jersey's squad for the 2019 ICC T20 World Cup Qualifier tournament in the United Arab Emirates. He was the joint-leading wicket-taker for Jersey in the tournament, with seven dismissals in six matches. In November 2019, he was named as the captain of Jersey's squad for the Cricket World Cup Challenge League B tournament in Oman. He made his List A debut, for Jersey against Uganda, on 2 December 2019.

In July 2021, Perchard was named as the new Jersey national team captain. His first event in the role was the regional final of the 2021 ICC Men's T20 World Cup Europe Qualifier tournament. After leading Jersey to victory, Perchard was named Channel Islands Sports Personality of the Year for 2021.

In March 2023, he was named in Jersey's squad for the 2023 Cricket World Cup Qualifier Play-off. He made his One Day International (ODI) debut on 27 March 2023, for Jersey against Canada in that tournament.

Captaining the team once more at the 2024–25 ICC Men's T20 World Cup Europe Qualifier in Germany in July 2024, Perchard took 2/5 from three overs in the final against Norway as Jersey won by six wickets.

On 7 September 2024, Perchard took 4/45 off nine overs as Jersey defeated Guernsey in the Inter-Insular Trophy one-day match. Later that month he was named as captain of Jersey's 14-player squad for the 2024 Cricket World Cup Challenge League A in Kenya.

Perchard was named player of the match in the decisive third game of the 2025 Inter-Insular T20I Trophy on 7 June 2025, scoring 26 not out and then taking 3/15, including two wickets in the final over, as Jersey won by three runs to retain the title 2-1. Later that month he was named as captain of the Jersey squad for the 2025 Men's T20 World Cup Europe Regional Final. He also captained the Jersey squads at the 2026 Men's T20 World Cup Europe Sub-regional Qualifier A in Cyprus and the 2026 Cricket World Cup Challenge League A final round in Kenya.
