= Dominic Blampied =

Jersey cricketer (born 1996)

Personal information
- Full name: Dominic Gerald Blampied
- Born: 10 July 1996 (age 30)
- Batting: Right-handed
- Bowling: Right-arm legbreak
- Role: Bowling all-rounder

International information
- National side: Jersey
- ODI debut (cap 12): 30 March 2023 v Namibia
- Last ODI: 1 April 2023 v Papua New Guinea
- T20I debut (cap 2): 31 May 2019 v Guernsey
- Last T20I: 23 May 2026 v Guernsey

Career statistics
Competition	ODI	T20I	LA
Matches	3	50	23
Runs scored	7	345	271
Batting average	3.50	17.25	22.58
100s/50s	0/0	0/0	0/0
Top score	7	43*	43*
Balls bowled	78	845	563
Wickets	0	49	18
Bowling average	–	19.46	30.50
5 wickets in innings	0	0	1
10 wickets in match	0	0	0
Best bowling	–	4/20	5/18
Catches/stumpings	0/–	21/–	8/–
- Source: Cricinfo, 25 May 2026

Dominic Blampied (born 10 July 1996) is a cricketer who plays for Jersey. In May 2019, he was named in Jersey's squad for the 2019 T20 Inter-Insular Cup against Guernsey. He made his Twenty20 International (T20I) debut for Jersey against Guernsey on 31 May 2019. Blampied was named the player of the series after scoring 92 runs and taking 6 wickets.

The same month, he was named in Jersey's squad for the Regional Finals of the 2018–19 ICC T20 World Cup Europe Qualifier tournament in Guernsey. He played in Jersey's opening match of the Regional Finals, also against Guernsey, on 15 June 2019.

He was a member of Jersey's squad for the 2019 ICC T20 World Cup Qualifier tournament in the United Arab Emirates. He was the joint-leading wicket-taker for Jersey in the tournament, with seven dismissals in six matches. In November 2019, he was named in Jersey's squad for the Cricket World Cup Challenge League B tournament in Oman. He made his List A debut, for Jersey against Uganda, on 2 December 2019.

In October 2021, Blampied was named in Jersey's T20I squad for the Regional Final of the 2021 ICC Men's T20 World Cup Europe Qualifier tournament.

In June 2022, he was named in Jersey's squad for the 2022 Uganda Cricket World Cup Challenge League B tournament. In the opening match of the tournament, against Uganda, Blampied took his first five-wicket haul in List A cricket.

In March 2023, Blampied was named in Jersey's squad for the 2023 Cricket World Cup Qualifier Play-off. He made his One Day International (ODI) debut for Jersey, on 30 March 2023, against Namibia in that tournament.
