= 2022 Men's T20 World Cup Europe sub-regional qualifiers =

Cricket qualification tournaments

The 2024 ICC Men's T20 World Cup was the ninth edition of the ICC Men's T20 World Cup, a biennial world cup for cricket in Twenty20 International (T20I) format, organized by the International Cricket Council (ICC). The qualification process for the world cup included two stages: direct qualification and regional qualification. The regional qualification for Europe was held in two stages: sub-regional qualifiers and regional final. The Europe region's sub-regional phase consisted of three sub-regional qualifiers, hosted by Cricket Finland from 12 to 19 and 24 to 31 July 2022 and by Belgian Cricket Federation from 28 June to 4 July 2022.

Italy progressed to the regional final after winning the qualifier A's final. Isle of Man's George Burrows scored the most runs (210) while Sweden's Zaker Taqawi took the most wickets (11) in the tournament.

Austria progressed to the regional final after winning the qualifier B's final. France 's Gustav McKeon was named player of the series having scored the most runs (377) while Austria's Sahel Zadran took the most wickets (12) in the tournament.

Denmark progressed to the regional final after winning the qualifier C's final. Denmark's Taranjit Bharaj was named player of the series while Nicolaj Laegsgaard scored the most runs (189) and took the most wickets (9) in the tournament.

== Qualifier A ==
2022 ICC Men's T20 World Cup Europe sub-regional qualifier A
- Dates: 12 – 19 July 2022
- Administrator(s): International Cricket Council; ICC Europe
- Cricket format: Twenty20 International
- Tournament format(s): Group round-robin and playoffs
- Host: Finland
- Champions: Italy
- Runners-up: Isle of Man
- Participants: 10
- Matches: 24
- Most runs: (Isle of Man) George Burrows (210)
- Most wickets: (Sweden) Zaker Taqawi (11)

Squads for the qualifier A
Croatia	Cyprus	Finland	Greece	Isle of Man
Jeffrey Grzinic (c); Daniel Turkich (vc); Sohail Ahmad; Wasal Bitis; Nikola Davidovic; Boro Jerkovic; Mate Jukic; Naseem Khan; Aman Maheshwari; Daniel Marsic; Jason Newton; Christopher Turkich; Sheldon Valjalo; John Vujnovich	Gurpratap Singh (c); Shoaib Ahmed; Ruwan Arachchilage; Scott Austin (wk); Muhammad Farooq; Syed Hussain; Iftekar Jaman; Riyaz Kajalwala; Akila Kalugala; Chamal Sadun; Roman Mazumder; Sachithra Pathirana (wk); Tejwinder Singh; Neeraj Tiwari	Nathan Collins (c); Mohammad Asaduzzaman; Peter Gallagher; Matthew Jenkinson; Sapan Mehta; Raaz Mohammad; Aravind Mohan (wk); Vanraaj Padhaal; Atif Rasheed; Ziaur Rehman; Jonathan Scamans (wk); Naveed Shahid; Amjad Sher; Mahesh Tambe	Anastasios Manousis (c); Spiridon Bogdos (vc, wk); Muaaz Ali; Ilias Bardis; Christodoulos Bogdanos; Gerasimos Fatouros; Georgios Galanis; Andreas Gasteratos; Alexandros Karvelas; Aristides Karvelas; Panagiotis Magafas; Amarpreet Mehmi; Aslam Mohammad; Ali Abdulla Popalzae; Thomas Zotos	Matthew Ansell (c); Samuel Barnett; Edward Beard; George Burrows; Joseph Burrows; Jacob Butler; Kieran Cawte; Fraser Clarke; Josh Clough; Carl Hartmann (wk); Dollin Jansen; Nathan Knights; Chris Langford; Adam McAuley
Italy	Romania	Serbia	Sweden	Turkey
Gareth Berg (c); Gian-Piero Meade (vc); Joy Perera (vc); Marcus Campopiano; Ali Hasan; Crishan Kalugamage; Damith Kosala; Bashar Khan; Harry Manenti; Anthony Mosca; Justin Mosca; Ishan Ranepura; Baljit Singh; Jaspreet Singh; Manpreet Singh	Ramesh Satheesan (c); Laurentiu Gherasim; Marian Gherasim; Ijaz Hussain; Manmeet Koli; Rohit Kumar; Gaurav Mishra; Satvik Nadigotla (wk); Sivakumar Periyalwar; Vasu Saini; Abdul Shakoor (wk); Taranjeet Singh; Shantanu Vashisht; Cosmin Zavoiu	Robin Vitas (c); Wintley Burton; Alexander Dizija; Aleksa Djorovic; Leslie Dunbar (wk); Alister Gajic; Simo Ivetic; Nicholas Johns-Wickberg; Matthew Kostic; Ayo Mene-Ejegi; Mark Pavlovic; Matija Sarenac; Slobodan Tosic; Vukasin Zimonjic	Abhijit Venkatesh (c); Umar Nawaz (vc); Baz Ayubi; Abdul Naser Baluch; Wynand Boshoff (wk); Faseeh Choudary; Ankit Dubey; Waqas Haider; Tasaduq Hussain; Liam Karlsson; Azam Khalil; Sami Khalil; Hamid Mahmood; Lemar Momand; Zaker Taqawi; Khalid Zahid; Ismaeel Zia; Imal Zuwak	Gokhan Alta (c); Ilyas Ataullah; Cagri Bayraktar; Hasan Cakir; Zafer Durmaz; Shamsullah Ehsan; Ishak Elec; Emin Kuyumcu; Deniz Mutu; Romeo Nath (wk); Mecit Ozturk; Tunahan Turan; Ali Turkmen; Tunahan Ulutuna

=== Qualifier A group stage ===
Group 1

Pos	Team	Pld	W	L	NR	Pts	NRR	Qualification
1	Italy	4	4	0	0	8	4.517	Advanced to the final
2	Finland	4	3	1	0	6	1.008	Advanced to the 3rd place playoff
3	Sweden	4	2	2	0	4	0.848	Advanced to the 5th place playoff
4	Croatia	4	1	3	0	2	−3.733	Advanced to the 7th place playoff
5	Greece	4	0	4	0	0	−2.648	

Source: ESPNcricinfo

12 July 2022
11:00
Scorecard

Greece; 67/6 (20 overs)	v	Italy; 69/1 (11.1 overs)
Spiridon Bogdos 19 (38); Crishan Kalugamage 3/11 (4 overs)		Anthony Mosca 34* (33); Alexandros Karvelas 1/13 (2 overs)

Italy won by 9 wickets
Tikkurila Cricket Ground, Vantaa
Umpires: Rizwan Akram (Ned) and Adnan Khan (Esp)
Player of the match: Crishan Kalugamage (Ita)

- Italy won the toss and elected to field.
- Christodoulos Bogdanos, Spiridon Bogdos, Gerasimos Fatouros, Andreas Gasteratos, Alexandros Karvelas, Aristides Karvelas, Panagiotis Magafas (Gre), Marcus Campopiano, Ali Hasan, Crishan Kalugamage, Bashar Khan, Harry Manenti, Anthony Mosca and Justin Mosca (Ita) all made their T20I debuts.

12 July 2022
16:00
Scorecard

Finland; 115 (19.3 overs)	v	Sweden; 103/7 (20 overs)
Jonathan Scamans 22 (18); Liam Karlsson 4/20 (4 overs)		Abhijit Venkatesh 35 (43); Raaz Mohammad 3/17 (4 overs)

Finland won by 12 runs
Tikkurila Cricket Ground, Vantaa
Umpires: Adnan Khan (Esp) and Adriaan van den Dries (Ned)
Player of the match: Raaz Mohammad (Fin)

- Sweden won the toss and elected to field.
- Matthew Jenkinson (Fin) and Waqas Haider (Swe) both made their T20I debuts.

13 July 2022
11:00
Scorecard

Croatia; 69 (19.5 overs)	v	Sweden; 70/2 (9.1 overs)
Christopher Turkich 15 (41); Zaker Taqawi 5/17 (4 overs)		Umar Nawaz 29 (20); John Vujnovich 2/26 (2 overs)

Sweden won by 8 wickets
Kerava National Cricket Ground, Kerava
Umpires: Sriharsha Kuchimanchi (Fin) and Adriaan van den Dries (Ned)
Player of the match: Zaker Taqawi (Swe)

- Sweden won the toss end elected to field.
- Sohail Ahmad, Wasal Bitis, Jeffrey Grzinic, Boro Jerkovic, Aman Maheshwari, Daniel Marsic, Jason Newton, Christopher Turkich, Daniel Turkich, Sheldon Valjalo and John Vujnovich (Cro) all made their T20I debuts.

13 July 2022
14:00
Scorecard

Finland; 141/6 (20 overs)	v	Italy; 144/5 (17.2 overs)
Aravind Mohan 61 (56); Harry Manenti 2/30 (4 overs)		Marcus Campopiano 50 (33); Peter Gallagher 2/28 (4 overs)

Italy won by 5 wickets
Kerava National Cricket Ground, Kerava
Umpires: Rizwan Akram (Ned) and Adriaan van den Dries (Ned)
Player of the match: Gareth Berg (Ita)

- Italy won the toss and elected to field.

15 July 2022
11:00
Scorecard

Italy; 169/7 (20 overs)	v	Sweden; 78 (15.3 overs)
Marcus Campopiano 62 (49); Abhijit Venkatesh 3/32 (4 overs)		Waqas Haider 19 (6); Harry Manenti 4/29 (4 overs)

Italy won by 91 runs
Tikkurila Cricket Ground, Vantaa
Umpires: Adnan Khan (Esp) and Adriaan van den Dries (Ned)
Player of the match: Marcus Campopiano (Ita)

- Sweden won the toss and elected to field.

15 July 2022
16:00
Scorecard

Croatia; 104/6 (20 overs)	v	Greece; 101 (20 overs)
Daniel Turkich 29 (29); Gerasimos Fatouros 1/13 (4 overs)		Panagiotis Magafas 30 (32); Boro Jerkovic 3/19 (3 overs)

Croatia won by 3 runs
Tikkurila Cricket Ground, Vantaa
Umpires: Srinidhi Ravindra (Fin) and Adriaan van den Dries (Ned)
Player of the match: Daniel Turkich (Cro)

- Greece won the toss and elected to field.
- Nikola Davidovic (Cro) made his T20I debut.

16 July 2022
11:00
Scorecard

Finland; 183/7 (20 overs)	v	Greece; 146 (19 overs)
Nathan Collins 45 (36); Georgios Galanis 2/16 (3 overs)		Gerasimos Fatouros 50 (28); Peter Gallagher 3/33 (4 overs)

Finland won by 37 runs
Kerava National Cricket Ground, Kerava
Umpires: Adnan Khan (Esp) and Allahudien Paleker (SA)
Player of the match: Peter Gallagher (Fin)

- Greece won the toss and elected to field.
- Ilias Bardis (Gre) made his T20I debut.

16 July 2022
16:00
Scorecard

Italy; 210/5 (20 overs)	v	Croatia; 44/7 (20 overs)
Anthony Mosca 78 (49); Daniel Turkich 2/27 (4 overs)		Boro Jerkovic 11* (32); Jaspreet Singh 2/9 (4 overs)

Italy won by 166 runs
Kerava National Cricket Ground, Kerava
Umpires: Allahudien Paleker (SA) and Adriaan van den Dries (Ned)
Player of the match: Anthony Mosca (Ita)

- Italy won the toss and elected to bat.
- Naseem Khan (Cro) made his T20I debut.

18 July 2022
11:00
Scorecard

Sweden; 150/6 (20 overs)	v	Greece; 43 (11.5 overs)
Hamid Mahmood 69 (58); Ali Abdulla Popalzae 3/21 (3 overs)		Alexandros Karvelas 24 (24); Ankit Dubey 3/10 (3 overs)

Sweden won by 107 runs
Tikkurila Cricket Ground, Vantaa
Umpires: Adnan Khan (Esp) and Sriharsha Kuchimanchi (Fin)
Player of the match: Hamid Mahmood (Swe)

- Greece won the toss and elected to field.
- Ali Abdulla Popalzae (Gre) and Ankit Dubey (Swe) both made their T20I debuts.

18 July 2022
16:00
Scorecard

Croatia; 85/8 (20 overs)	v	Finland; 87/5 (13.1 overs)
Daniel Marsic 22 (42); Raaz Mohammad 2/9 (4 overs)		Vanraaj Padhaal 23* (22); Daniel Turkich 3/7 (4 overs)

Finland won by 5 wickets
Tikkurila Cricket Ground, Vantaa
Umpires: Adnan Khan (Esp) and Allahudien Paleker (SA)
Player of the match: Daniel Turkich (Cro)

- Croatia won the toss and elected to bat.
- Mate Jukic (Cro) made his T20I debut.

Group 2

Pos	Team	Pld	W	L	NR	Pts	NRR	Qualification
1	Isle of Man	4	4	0	0	8	3.238	Advanced to the final
2	Cyprus	4	2	2	0	4	1.451	Advanced to the 3rd place playoff
3	Romania	4	2	2	0	4	0.136	Advanced to the 5th place playoff
4	Serbia	4	2	2	0	4	−0.826	Advanced to the 7th place playoff
5	Turkey	4	0	4	0	0	−3.754	

Source: ESPNcricinfo

12 July 2022
11:00
Scorecard

Cyprus; 120 (19.2 overs)	v	Isle of Man; 122/2 (14.3 overs)
Shoaib Ahmed 25 (23); Joseph Burrows 4/16 (4 overs)		George Burrows 69* (45); Chamal Sadun 1/12 (2 overs)

Isle of Man won by 8 wickets
Kerava National Cricket Ground, Kerava
Umpires: Sriharsha Kuchimanchi (Fin) and Allahudien Paleker (SA)
Player of the match: George Burrows (IoM)

- Isle of Man won the toss and elected to field.
- Shoaib Ahmed, Ruwan Arachchilage, Riyaz Kajalwala, Akila Kalugala (Cyp) and Kieran Cawte (IoM) all made their T20I debuts.

12 July 2022
16:00
Scorecard

Romania; 147/5 (20 overs)	v	Turkey; 96/8 (20 overs)
Vasu Saini 52* (44); Ali Turkmen 1/17 (4 overs)		Ilyas Ataullah 26* (18); Shantanu Vashisht 2/10 (4 overs)

Romania won by 51 runs
Kerava National Cricket Ground, Kerava
Umpires: Sriharsha Kuchimanchi (Fin) and Srinidhi Ravindra (Fin)
Player of the match: Vasu Saini (Rom)

- Turkey won the toss and elected to field.
- Manmeet Koli, Rohit Kumar (Rom), Gokhan Alta, Ilyas Ataullah, Cagri Bayraktar, Zafer Durmaz, Shamsullah Ehsan, Ishak Elec, Emin Kuyumcu, Romeo Nath, Mecit Ozturk and Ali Turkmen (Tur) all made their T20I debuts.

13 July 2022
11:00
Scorecard

Cyprus; 154/8 (20 overs)	v	Romania; 134/9 (20 overs)
Scott Austin 34 (29); Satvik Nadigotla 3/30 (4 overs)		Vasu Saini 27 (26); Gurpratap Singh 3/26 (4 overs)

Cyprus won by 20 runs
Tikkurila Cricket Ground, Vantaa
Umpires: Allahudien Paleker (SA) and Srinidhi Ravindra (Fin)
Player of the match: Shoaib Ahmed (Cyp)

- Romania won the toss and elected to field.

13 July 2022
16:00
Scorecard

Isle of Man; 165/7 (20 overs)	v	Serbia; 97/7 (20 overs)
George Burrows 60 (46); Ayo Mene-Ejegi 4/30 (4 overs)		Simo Ivetic 29 (35); Matthew Ansell 2/10 (4 overs)

Isle of Man won by 68 runs
Tikkurila Cricket Ground, Vantaa
Umpires: Adnan Khan (Esp) and Srinidhi Ravindra (Fin)
Player of the match: George Burrows (IoM)

- Serbia won the toss and elected to field.

15 July 2022
11:00
Scorecard

Turkey; 67 (18.1 overs)	v	Serbia; 68/3 (14.5 overs)
Romeo Nath 20 (34); Nicholas Johns-Wickberg 3/6 (4 overs)		Simo Ivetic 21 (32); Hasan Cakir 1/5 (1 over)

Serbia won by 7 wickets
Kerava National Cricket Ground, Kerava
Umpires: Rizwan Akram (Ned) and Allahudien Paleker (SA)
Player of the match: Nicholas Johns-Wickberg (Srb)

- Serbia won the toss and elected to field.
- Hasan Cakir (Tur) made his T20I debut.

15 July 2022
16:00
Scorecard

Romania; 120 (19.2 overs)	v	Isle of Man; 121/2 (12.2 overs)
Vasu Saini 31 (26); Jacob Butler 2/19 (3 overs)		Nathan Knights 69 (31); Vasu Saini 2/4 (2 overs)

Isle of Man won by 8 wickets
Kerava National Cricket Ground, Kerava
Umpires: Rizwan Akram (Ned) and Sriharsha Kuchimanchi (Fin)
Player of the match: Nathan Knights (IoM)

- Isle of Man won the toss and elected to field.

16 July 2022
11:00
Scorecard

Romania; 133/6 (20 overs)	v	Serbia; 102/7 (20 overs)
Sivakumar Periyalwar 35* (33); Vukasin Zimonjic 3/26 (4 overs)		Simo Ivetic 27 (38); Taranjeet Singh 4/17 (4 overs)

Romania won by 31 runs
Tikkurila Cricket Ground, Vantaa
Umpires: Sriharsha Kuchimanchi (Fin) and Srinidhi Ravindra (Fin)
Player of the match: Taranjeet Singh (Rom)

- Romania won the toss and elected to bat.

16 July 2022
16:00
Scorecard

Cyprus; 183/8 (20 overs)	v	Turkey; 48 (13.3 overs)
Roman Mazumder 36 (17); Ilyas Ataullah 2/13 (2 overs)		Cagri Bayraktar 11 (9); Chamal Sadun 4/1 (1.3 overs)

Cyprus won by 135 runs
Tikkurila Cricket Ground, Vantaa
Umpires: Rizwan Akram (Ned) and Sriharsha Kuchimanchi (Fin)
Player of the match: Chamal Sadun (Cyp)

- Cyprus won the toss and elected to bat.
- Muhammad Farooq, Syed Hussain (Cyp) and Deniz Mutu (Tur) all made their T20I debuts.
- Chamal Sadun became the first player for Cyprus to take a hat-trick in men's T20Is.

18 July 2022
11:00
Scorecard

Cyprus; 125 (19.1 overs)	v	Serbia; 126/6 (19.2 overs)
Roman Mazumder 27 (26); Matija Sarenac 3/29 (4 overs)		Alexander Dizija 68 (61); Tejwinder Singh 2/23 (4 overs)

Serbia won by 4 wickets
Kerava National Cricket Ground, Kerava
Umpires: Rizwan Akram (Ned) and Srinidhi Ravindra (Fin)
Player of the match: Alexander Dizija (Srb)

- Cyprus won the toss and elected to bat.

18 July 2022
16:00
Scorecard

Isle of Man; 171/9 (20 overs)	v	Turkey; 97/8 (20 overs)
George Burrows 54 (35); Ishak Elec 4/31 (4 overs)		Gokhan Alta 28 (27); Chris Langford 3/10 (4 overs)

Isle of Man won by 74 runs
Kerava National Cricket Ground, Kerava
Umpires: Srinidhi Ravindra (Fin) and Adriaan van den Dries (Ned)
Player of the match: George Burrows (IoM)

- Isle of Man won the toss and elected to bat.

=== Qualifier A playoffs ===
7th place playoff
19 July 2022
11:00
Scorecard

Serbia; 90 (20 overs)	v	Croatia; 94/7 (18.4 overs)
Simo Ivetic 29 (50); Nikola Davidovic 3/22 (4 overs)		John Vujnovich 20 (41); Nicholas Johns-Wickberg 3/15 (3 overs)

Croatia won by 3 wickets
Tikkurila Cricket Ground, Vantaa
Umpires: Allahudien Paleker (SA) and Srinidhi Ravindra (Fin)
Player of the match: Nikola Davidovic (Cro)

- Serbia won the toss and elected to bat.

5th place playoff
19 July 2022
16:00
Scorecard

Romania; 104 (19.5 overs)	v	Sweden; 106/2 (14.2 overs)
Gaurav Mishra 24 (17); Zaker Taqawi 3/13 (4 overs)		Hamid Mahmood 51* (43); Taranjeet Singh 1/18 (3 overs)

Sweden won by 8 wickets
Tikkurila Cricket Ground, Vantaa
Umpires: Sriharsha Kuchimanchi (Fin) and Allahudien Paleker (SA)
Player of the match: Hamid Mahmood (Swe)

- Romania won the toss and elected to bat.

3rd place playoff
19 July 2022
11:00
Scorecard

Finland; 159 (19.3 overs)	v	Cyprus; 148/7 (20 overs)
Atif Rasheed 43 (26); Gurpratap Singh 4/35 (4 overs)		Chamal Sadun 52* (50); Mahesh Tambe 3/21 (4 overs)

Finland won by 11 runs
Kerava National Cricket Ground, Kerava
Umpires: Rizwan Akram (Ned) and Adnan Khan (Esp)
Player of the match: Atif Rasheed (Fin)

- Finland won the toss and elected to bat.

Final
19 July 2022
16:00
Scorecard

Isle of Man; 101/8 (20 overs)	v	Italy; 102/3 (10.5 overs)
Carl Hartmann 30 (30); Harry Manenti 3/14 (4 overs)		Marcus Campopiano 35* (21); Joseph Burrows 2/28 (3 overs)

Italy won by 7 wickets
Kerava National Cricket Ground, Kerava
Umpires: Rizwan Akram (Ned) and Adriaan van den Dries (Ned)
Player of the match: Marcus Campopiano (Ita)

- Italy won the toss and elected to field.
- Josh Clough (IoM) made his T20I debut.

== Qualifier B ==
2022 ICC Men's T20 World Cup Europe sub-regional qualifier B
- Dates: 24 – 31 July 2022
- Administrator(s): International Cricket Council; ICC Europe
- Cricket format: Twenty20 International
- Tournament format(s): Group round-robin and playoffs
- Host: Finland
- Champions: Austria
- Runners-up: Norway
- Participants: 10
- Matches: 24
- Player of the series: (France) Gustav McKeon
- Most runs: (France) Gustav McKeon (377)
- Most wickets: (Austria) Sahel Zadran (12)

Squads for the qualifier B
Austria	Bulgaria	Czech Republic	Estonia	France
Razmal Shigiwal (c); Shahil Momin (vc); Habib Ahmadzai; Mirza Ahsan; Abdullah Akbarjan; Mehar Cheema (wk); Iqbal Hossain; Aqib Iqbal; Amit Nathwani; Armaan Randhawa; Jaweed Sadran; Umair Tariq; Mark Simpson-Parker (wk); Ahsan Yousuf; Sahel Zadran	Prakash Mishra (c); Hristo Lakov (vc); Jacob Albin; Sulaiman Ali; Aravinda De Silva; Rohit Dhiman; Kevin D'Souza; Saim Hussain (wk); Mukul Kadyan; Ivaylo Katzarski; Dimo Nikolov; Omar Rassol (wk); Asad Ali Rehemtulla; Delrick Varghese	Arun Ashokan (c); Naveed Ahmed; Sazib Bhuiyan; Sabawoon Davizi; Abul Farhad; Tripurari Lal; Smit Patel; Sharan Ramakrishnan; Divyendra Singh; Dylan Steyn; Ushan Thenannahelage; Ritik Tomar; Sameera Waththage; Sudesh Wickramasekara	Arslan Amjad (c); Vimal Dwivedi; Elias Hasan; Stuart Hook (wk); Habib Khan; Maidul Islam; Ali Masood; Saqib Naveed; Murali Obili; Aditya Paul; Ali Raza; Ramesh Tanna; Marko Vaik (wk); Kalle Vislapuu	Noman Amjad (c); Jubaid Ahamed; Zain Ahmad; Dawood Ahmadzai; Lingeswaran Canessane; Abdulmalik Jabarkhel; Ibrahim Jabarkhel; Hevit Jackson (wk); Rahmatullah Mangal; Rohullah Mangal; Gustav McKeon; Pirakajan Pirabakaran; Abdul Rahman; Suventhiran Santhirakumaran
Guernsey	Luxembourg	Norway	Slovenia	Switzerland
Josh Butler (c); Luke Bichard; Isaac Damarell (wk); Ben Ferbrache; David Hooper; Luke Le Tissier; Adam Martel; Declan Martel; Jason Martin; Oliver Nightingale; Tom Nightingale; William Peatfield; Anthony Stokes; Matthew Stokes	Joost Mees (c, wk); Vikram Vijh (vc); James Barker; Timothy Barker; William Cope; Amit Dhingra; Mohit Dixit; Shiv Gill; Atif Kamal; Saransh Kushretha; Pankaj Malav; Ankush Nanda; Anoop Orsu; Girish Venkateswaran	Ali Saleem (c); Kuruge Abeyrathna; Usman Arif; Muhammad Butt; Nouman Butt; Ansar Iqbal; Raza Iqbal; Qamar Mushtaque; Ibrahim Rahimi; Vinay Ravi; Sher Sahak; Rhys Saunders; Ahmadullah Shinwari; Aminullah Tanha	Ayyaz Qureshi (c); Mark Oman (vc); ~~Muhammad Aqeel~~; Shahid Arshad; Awais Ikram; Mazhar Khan (wk); Waqar Khan (wk); Sudhakar Koppolu; Dileep Pallekonda; Primoz Pustoslemsek; Bhagwant Sandhu; Muhammad Siddiqui; Ramanjot Singh; Taher Muhammad (wk); Nilesh Ujawe	Faheem Nazir (c); Arjun Vinod (vc); Noorkhan Ahmedi; Aidan Andrews; Kenardo Fletcher; Aneesh Kumar; Asad Mahmood; Osama Mahmood; Anser Mehmood; Sathya Narayanan; Ali Nayyer; Azeem Nazir; Jai Sinh; Ashwin Vinod

=== Qualifier B group stage ===
Group 1

Pos	Team	Pld	W	L	NR	Pts	NRR	Qualification
1	Austria	4	4	0	0	8	4.249	Advanced to the final
2	Guernsey	4	3	1	0	6	2.200	Advanced to the 3rd place playoff
3	Luxembourg	4	2	2	0	4	−0.391	Advanced to the 5th place playoff
4	Bulgaria	4	1	3	0	2	−3.341	Advanced to the 7th place playoff
5	Slovenia	4	0	4	0	0	−3.457	

Source: ESPNcricinfo

24 July 2022
11:00
Scorecard

Austria; 139 (18.4 overs)	v	Luxembourg; 103 (18 overs)
Iqbal Hossain 34 (16); Saransh Kushretha 3/20 (4 overs)		Timothy Barker 32 (34); Sahel Zadran 3/7 (3 overs)

Austria won by 36 runs
Tikkurila Cricket Ground, Vantaa
Umpires: Mark Jameson (Ger) and Allahudien Paleker (SA)
Player of the match: Sahel Zadran (Aut)

- Luxembourg won the toss and elected to field.

24 July 2022
16:00
Scorecard

Guernsey; 130/8 (19 overs)	v	Bulgaria; 78 (18 overs)
Tom Nightingale 40 (24); Asad Ali Rehemtulla 4/24 (4 overs)		Hristo Lakov 28 (32); Adam Martel 3/17 (4 overs)

Guernsey won by 52 runs (DLS method)
Tikkurila Cricket Ground, Vantaa
Umpires: Shanaka Fernando (Ita) and Mark Jameson (Ger)
Player of the match: Tom Nightingale (Gue)

- Bulgaria won the toss and elected to field.
- Bulgaria were set a revised target of 131 runs in 19 overs due to rain.
- Rohit Dhiman (Bul) and Adam Martel (Gue) both made their T20I debuts.

25 July 2022
11:00
Scorecard

Austria; 214/4 (20 overs)	v	Slovenia; 73 (17.1 overs)
Mirza Ahsan 70* (33); Awais Ikram 2/34 (3 overs)		Muhammad Siddiqui 18 (12); Sahel Zadran 5/13 (3.1 overs)

Austria won by 141 runs
Kerava National Cricket Ground, Kerava
Umpires: Shanaka Fernando (Ita) and Sriharsha Kuchimanchi (Fin)
Player of the match: Mirza Ahsan (Aut)

- Slovenia won the toss and elected to field.
- Shahid Arshad, Awais Ikram, Mazhar Khan, Sudhakar Koppolu, Taher Muhammad, Mark Oman, Primoz Pustoslemsek, Ayyaz Qureshi, Muhammad Siddiqui, Ramanjot Singh and Nilesh Ujawe (Svn) all made their T20I debuts.
- Sahel Zadran (Aut) took his first five-wicket haul in T20Is.

25 July 2022
16:00
Scorecard

Guernsey; 131/5 (20 overs)	v	Luxembourg; 114/6 (20 overs)
Matthew Stokes 35 (31); Saransh Kushretha 2/18 (4 overs)		Shiv Gill 47 (38); William Peatfield 3/22 (4 overs)

Guernsey won by 17 runs
Kerava National Cricket Ground, Kerava
Umpires: Mark Jameson (Ger) and Sriharsha Kuchimanchi (Fin)
Player of the match: Shiv Gill (Lux)

- Luxembourg won the toss and elected to field.

27 July 2022
11:00
Scorecard

Guernsey; 139/6 (20 overs)	v	Austria; 141/8 (19.4 overs)
Luke Le Tissier 37 (28); Sahel Zadran 1/20 (4 overs)		Razmal Shigiwal 42 (29); William Peatfield 3/22 (4 overs)

Austria won by 2 wickets
Tikkurila Cricket Ground, Vantaa
Umpires: Mark Jameson (Ger) and Srinidhi Ravindra (Fin)
Player of the match: Razmal Shigiwal (Aut)

- Guernsey won the toss and elected to bat.

27 July 2022
16:00
Scorecard

Slovenia; 140/9 (20 overs)	v	Bulgaria; 143/7 (19.5 overs)
Muhammad Siddiqui 48 (33); Asad Ali Rehemtulla 3/32 (4 overs)		Aravinda De Silva 55 (49); Nilesh Ujawe 2/12 (4 overs)

Bulgaria won by 3 wickets
Tikkurila Cricket Ground, Vantaa
Umpires: Shanaka Fernando (Ita) and Mark Jameson (Ger)
Player of the match: Aravinda De Silva (Bul)

- Bulgaria won the toss and elected to field.
- Waqar Khan (Svn) made his T20I debut.

28 July 2022
11:00
Scorecard

Luxembourg; 164/6 (20 overs)	v	Bulgaria; 73/5 (9 overs)
Shiv Gill 45 (38); Kevin D'Souza 2/29 (4 overs)		Omar Rassol 32 (16); William Cope 1/6 (1 over)

Luxembourg won by 21 runs (DLS method)
Kerava National Cricket Ground, Kerava
Umpires: Shanaka Fernando (Ita) and Srinidhi Ravindra (Fin)
Player of the match: Shiv Gill (Lux)

- Luxembourg won the toss and elected to bat.
- Bulgaria were set a revised target of 95 runs in 9 overs due to rain.

28 July 2022
16:00
Scorecard

Slovenia; 55 (14.5 overs)	v	Guernsey; 60/1 (5.3 overs)
Ramanjot Singh 18 (17); Matthew Stokes 2/11 (3 overs)		Luke Le Tissier 29 (9); Primoz Pustoslemsek 1/15 (1.3 overs)

Guernsey won by 9 wickets
Kerava National Cricket Ground, Kerava
Umpires: Shanaka Fernando (Ita) and Allahudien Paleker (SA)
Player of the match: Matthew Stokes (Gue)

- Guernsey won the toss and elected to field.
- Bhagwant Sandhu (Svn) made his T20I debut.

30 July 2022
11:00
Scorecard

Austria; 206/4 (20 overs)	v	Bulgaria; 48 (11.3 overs)
Armaan Randhawa 78* (45); Mukul Kadyan 2/26 (4 overs)		Hristo Lakov 14* (17); Aqib Iqbal 3/10 (3 overs)

Austria won by 158 runs
Tikkurila Cricket Ground, Vantaa
Umpires: Shanaka Fernando (Ita) and Allahudien Paleker (SA)
Player of the match: Iqbal Hossain (Aut)

- Austria won the toss and elected to bat.

30 July 2022
16:00
Scorecard

Luxembourg; 129 (19.3 overs)	v	Slovenia; 124/8 (20 overs)
Timothy Barker 36 (23); Muhammad Siddiqui 3/21 (4 overs)		Ramanjot Singh 46 (42); Atif Kamal 3/15 (3 overs)

Luxembourg won by 5 runs
Tikkurila Cricket Ground, Vantaa
Umpires: Shanaka Fernando (Ita) and Jesper Jensen (Den)
Player of the match: Muhammad Siddiqui (Svn)

- Luxembourg won the toss and elected to bat.
- Dileep Pallekonda (Svn) made his T20I debut.

Group 2

Pos	Team	Pld	W	L	NR	Pts	NRR	Qualification
1	Norway	4	3	1	0	6	3.197	Advanced to the final
2	France	4	3	1	0	6	1.132	Advanced to the 3rd place playoff
3	Switzerland	4	2	2	0	4	−0.006	Advanced to the 5th place playoff
4	Czech Republic	4	2	2	0	4	−1.417	Advanced to the 7th place playoff
5	Estonia	4	0	4	0	0	−2.417	

Source: ESPNcricinfo

24 July 2022
11:00
Scorecard

Estonia; 101 (18.4 overs)	v	Norway; 102/0 (10 overs)
Ali Masood 44 (38); Raza Iqbal 3/29 (4 overs)		Raza Iqbal 64* (37)

Norway won by 10 wickets
Kerava National Cricket Ground, Kerava
Umpires: Jesper Jensen (Den) and Sriharsha Kuchimanchi (Fin)
Player of the match: Raza Iqbal (Nor)

- Estonia won the toss and elected to bat.
- Aditya Paul (Est), Muhammad Butt, Qamar Mushtaque and Ibrahim Rahimi (Nor) all made their T20I debuts.

24 July 2022
16:00
Scorecard

France; 153/6 (20 overs)	v	Czech Republic; 102/9 (20 overs)
Gustav McKeon 76 (54); Sameera Waththage 1/14 (3 overs)		Dylan Steyn 22 (17); Zain Ahmad 2/13 (3 overs)

France won by 51 runs
Kerava National Cricket Ground, Kerava
Umpires: Jesper Jensen (Den) and Srinidhi Ravindra (Fin)
Player of the match: Gustav McKeon (Fra)

- Czech Republic won the toss and elected to field.
- Zain Ahmad, Rohullah Mangal, Gustav McKeon and Abdul Rahman (Fra) all made their T20I debuts.

25 July 2022
11:00
Scorecard

Norway; 186/6 (20 overs)	v	Czech Republic; 66 (15.2 overs)
Raza Iqbal 53 (43); Sameera Waththage 2/38 (4 overs)		Sabawoon Davizi 23 (32); Muhammad Butt 5/8 (4 overs)

Norway won by 120 runs
Tikkurila Cricket Ground, Vantaa
Umpires: Allahudien Paleker (SA) and Srinidhi Ravindra (Fin)
Player of the match: Muhammad Butt (Nor)

- Norway won the toss and elected to bat.
- Muhammad Butt became the first player for Norway to take a five-wicket haul in men's T20Is.

25 July 2022
16:00
Scorecard

France; 157/5 (20 overs)	v	Switzerland; 158/9 (20 overs)
Gustav McKeon 109 (61); Ali Nayyer 2/26 (3 overs)		Faheem Nazir 67 (46); Zain Ahmad 4/20 (4 overs)

Switzerland won by 1 wicket
Tikkurila Cricket Ground, Vantaa
Umpires: Allahudien Paleker (SA) and Srinidhi Ravindra (Fin)
Player of the match: Ali Nayyer (Sui)

- France won the toss and elected to bat.
- Abdulmalik Jabarkhel (Fra), Kenardo Fletcher, Sathya Narayanan and Jai Sinh (Sui) all made their T20I debuts.
- Gustav McKeon became the first player for France to score a century in men's T20Is, and also the youngest player to score a century in men's T20Is (18 years and 280 days).

27 July 2022
11:00
Scorecard

Switzerland; 173/4 (20 overs)	v	Estonia; 142/3 (20 overs)
Faheem Nazir 107* (68); Habib Khan 2/21 (4 overs)		Ali Masood 69* (56); Faheem Nazir 2/28 (4 overs)

Switzerland won by 31 runs
Kerava National Cricket Ground, Kerava
Umpires: Sriharsha Kuchimanchi (Fin) and Allahudien Paleker (SA)
Player of the match: Faheem Nazir (Sui)

- Switzerland won the toss and elected to bat.
- Azeem Nazir (Sui) made his T20I debut.
- Faheem Nazir became the first player for Switzerland to score a century in men's T20Is.

27 July 2022
16:00
Scorecard

France; 158/8 (20 overs)	v	Norway; 147 (19.2 overs)
Gustav McKeon 101 (53); Usman Arif 2/13 (2 overs)		Kuruge Abeyrathna 45 (37); Noman Amjad 3/24 (4 overs)

France won by 11 runs
Kerava National Cricket Ground, Kerava
Umpires: Jesper Jensen (Den) and Allahudien Paleker (SA)
Player of the match: Gustav McKeon (Fra)

- France won the toss and elected to bat.
- Gustav McKeon (Fra) became the first player to score back-to-back centuries in men's T20Is.

28 July 2022
11:00
Scorecard

Norway; 174/7 (20 overs)	v	Switzerland; 25/1 (5 overs)
Ali Saleem 53* (37); Aneesh Kumar 2/10 (4 overs)		Faheem Nazir 12 (9); Ahmadullah Shinwari 1/15 (3 overs)

Norway won by 12 runs (DLS method)
Tikkurila Cricket Ground, Vantaa
Umpires: Mark Jameson (Ger) and Jesper Jensen (Den)
Player of the match: Ali Saleem (Nor)

- Norway won the toss and elected to bat.
- No further play was possible due to rain.
- Rhys Saunders (Nor) made his T20I debut.

28 July 2022
16:00
Scorecard

Czech Republic; 135/9 (20 overs)	v	Estonia; 93/9 (20 overs)
Sabawoon Davizi 47 (36); Habib Khan 4/16 (4 overs)		Arslan Amjad 27 (26); Sudesh Wickramasekara 4/14 (3 overs)

Czech Republic won by 42 runs
Tikkurila Cricket Ground, Vantaa
Umpires: Jesper Jensen (Den) and Sriharsha Kuchimanchi (Fin)
Player of the match: Sudesh Wickramasekara (Cze)

- Czech Republic won the toss and elected to bat.
- Abul Farhad (Cze) and Ramesh Tanna (Est) both made their T20I debuts.
- Sudesh Wickramasekara became the first player for Czech Republic to take a hat-trick in men's T20Is.

30 July 2022
11:00
Scorecard

Switzerland; 183/8 (20 overs)	v	Czech Republic; 184/3 (17.4 overs)
Faheem Nazir 113 (67); Arun Ashokan 3/32 (4 overs)		Sazib Bhuiyan 51 (25); Kenardo Fletcher 1/27 (3.4 overs)

Czech Republic won by 7 wickets
Kerava National Cricket Ground, Kerava
Umpires: Mark Jameson (Ger) and Srinidhi Ravindra (Fin)
Player of the match: Faheem Nazir (Sui)

- Switzerland won the toss and elected to bat.

30 July 2022
16:00
Scorecard

France; 183/7 (20 overs)	v	Estonia; 124/8 (16 overs)
Gustav McKeon 87 (51); Habib Khan 3/31 (4 overs)		Habib Khan 37 (23); Gustav McKeon 1/7 (1 over)

France won by 25 runs (DLS method)
Kerava National Cricket Ground, Kerava
Umpires: Sriharsha Kuchimanchi (Fin) and Srinidhi Ravindra (Fin)
Player of the match: Gustav McKeon (Fra)

- France won the toss and elected to bat.
- Estonia were set a revised target of 150 runs in 16 overs due to rain.
- Habib Khan became the first player for Estonia to take a hat-trick in men's T20Is.

=== Qualifier B playoffs ===
7th place playoff
31 July 2022
11:00
Scorecard

Bulgaria; 117 (19.1 overs)	v	Czech Republic; 118/6 (18.4 overs)
Saim Hussain 39 (42); Sudesh Wickramasekara 5/15 (3.1 overs)		Dylan Steyn 34 (44); Prakash Mishra 2/25 (4 overs)

Czech Republic won by 4 wickets
Tikkurila Cricket Ground, Vantaa
Umpires: Jesper Jensen (Den) and Sriharsha Kuchimanchi (Fin)
Player of the match: Sudesh Wickramasekara (Cze)

- Bulgaria won the toss and elected to bat.
- Sudesh Wickramasekara became the first player for Czech Republic to take a five-wicket haul in men's T20Is.

5th place playoff
31 July 2022
16:00
Scorecard

Luxembourg; 115/9 (20 overs)	v	Switzerland; 108 (20 overs)
Shiv Gill 23 (26); Jai Sinh 5/23 (4 overs)		Azeem Nazir 36 (40); Pankaj Malav 3/22 (4 overs)

Luxembourg won by 7 runs
Tikkurila Cricket Ground, Vantaa
Umpires: Shanaka Fernando (Ita) and Sriharsha Kuchimanchi (Fin)
Player of the match: Jai Sinh (Sui)

- Luxembourg won the toss and elected to bat.
- Jai Sinh became the first player for Switzerland to take a five-wicket haul in men's T20Is.

3rd place playoff
31 July 2022
11:00
Scorecard

Guernsey; 153/6 (20 overs)	v	France; 97 (19 overs)
Isaac Damarell 51 (45); Ibrahim Jabarkhel 2/12 (2 overs)		Noman Amjad 27 (21); Luke Bichard 4/20 (4 overs)

Guernsey won by 56 runs
Kerava National Cricket Ground, Kerava
Umpires: Mark Jameson (Ger) and Allahudien Paleker (SA)
Player of the match: Luke Bichard (Gue)

- Guernsey won the toss and elected to bat.

Final
31 July 2022
16:00
Scorecard

Norway; 77 (12.4 overs)	v	Austria; 77/1 (8.1 overs)
Raza Iqbal 19 (17); Sahel Zadran 3/10 (2.4 overs)		Iqbal Hossain 66 (36); Qamar Mushtaque 1/10 (2 overs)

Austria won by 9 wickets (DLS method)
Kerava National Cricket Ground, Kerava
Umpires: Allahudien Paleker (SA) and Srinidhi Ravindra (Fin)
Player of the match: Iqbal Hossain (Aut)

- Norway won the toss and elected to bat.
- Austria were set a revised target of 77 runs in 14 overs due to rain.

== Qualifier C ==
2022 ICC Men's T20 World Cup Europe sub-regional qualifier C
- Dates: 28 June – 4 July 2022
- Administrator(s): International Cricket Council; ICC Europe
- Cricket format: Twenty20 International
- Tournament format(s): Group round-robin and playoffs
- Host: Belgium
- Champions: Denmark
- Runners-up: Portugal
- Participants: 8
- Matches: 20
- Player of the series: (Denmark) Taranjit Bharaj
- Most runs: (Denmark) Nicolaj Laegsgaard (189)
- Most wickets: (Denmark) Nicolaj Laegsgaard (9)

Squads for the qualifier C
Belgium	Denmark	Gibraltar	Hungary
Sheraz Sheikh (c); Maqsood Ahmad; Khalid Ahmadi; Ahmad Khalid Ahmadzai; Sajad Ahmadzai; Fahim Bhatti; Shaheryar Butt (wk); Murid Ekrami; Omid Mailk Khel; Aziz Mohammad; Muhammad Muneeb; Ali Raza (wk); Shagharai Sefat; Saber Zakhil	Frederik Klokker (c); Saif Ahmad; Surya Anand; Saran Aslam; Taranjit Bharaj (wk); Oliver Hald; Omar Hayat; Jino Jojo; ~~Amjad Khan~~; Nicolaj Laegsgaard; Rizwan Mahmood; Saud Munir; Hamid Shah (vc); Musa Shaheen; Shangeev Thanikaithasan	Avinash Pai (c); Kieron Ferrary (vc); Samarth Bodha; Louis Bruce; Ian Farrell; James Fitzgerald; Julian Freyone; Mark Gouws; Charles Harrison; Richard Hatchman; Iain Latin; Joseph Marples (wk); Kenroy Nestor; Philip Raikes; Kayron Stagno; Matthew Whelan	Abhijeet Ahuja (c); Bhavani Adapaka; Abhishek Ahuja (wk); Satyadeep Ashwathnarayana (wk); Khaibar Deldar; Ali Farasat; Mark Fontaine; Abishek Kheterpal; Zeeshan Kukikhel; Akramullah Malikzada; Harshvardhan Mandhyan; Zahir Mohammed; Sandeep Mohandas; Asanka Weligamage; Ali Yalmaz
Israel	Malta	Portugal	Spain
Josh Evans (c); Abraham Amado; Shailesh Bangera (wk); Michael Cohen (wk); Eitamar Kahamker; Tomer Kahamker; Levi Kamarlekar; Niv Nagavkar; Yair Nagavkar; Yogev Nagavkar; Eliezar Samson; Gabriel Schachat; Eshkol Solomon; Elan Talker	Bikram Arora (c); Waseem Abbas; Imran Ameer; Gopal Chaturvedi; Basil George; Heinrich Gericke; Jaison Jerome; Aaftab Alam Khan (wk); Zeeshan Khan; Bilal Muhammad; Jitesh Patel; Justin Shaju; Amar Sharma; Samuel Stanislaus; Varun Thamotharam	Najjam Shahzad (c); Syed Maisam Ali; Azhar Andani; Anthony Chambers; Sharn Gomes; Parth Jounjat; Siraj Ullah Khadem; Imran Khan; Junaid Khan; Kuldeep Gholiya (wk); Fakhrul Mohon; Ali Naqi; Arslan Naseem; Zohaib Sarwar; Amandeep Singh; Francoise Stoman (wk); Amir Zaib	Christian Munoz-Mills (c); Lorne Burns (vc); Raja Adeel; Awais Ahmed (wk); Yasir Ali; Mohammad Atif; Hamza Dar; Daniel Doyle-Calle; Zulqarnain Haider; Mohammad Kamran; Atif Mehmood; Ravi Panchal; Charlie Rumistrzewicz; Josh Trembeath-Moro

On 22 June 2022, Saud Munir replaced Amjad Khan in the Denmark squad due to work commitments.

=== Qualifier C group stage ===
Group 1

Pos	Team	Pld	W	L	NR	Pts	NRR	Qualification
1	Belgium	3	3	0	0	6	1.445	Advanced to the semi-finals
2	Denmark	3	2	1	0	4	3.467	Advanced to the semi-finals
3	Gibraltar	3	1	2	0	2	−3.560	Advanced to the 5th place semi-finals
4	Hungary	3	0	3	0	0	−1.617	Advanced to the 5th place semi-finals

Source: ESPNcricinfo

28 June 2022
11:00
Scorecard

Gibraltar; 139/5 (20 overs)	v	Belgium; 142/3 (12 overs)
Avinash Pai 76* (58); Shagharai Sefat 2/31 (4 overs)		Aziz Mohammad 72 (29); Samarth Bodha 1/3 (1 over)

Belgium won by 7 wickets
Ghent Oval, Ghent
Umpires: Rizwan Akram (Ned) and Adriaan van den Dries (Ned)
Player of the match: Aziz Mohammad (Bel)

- Belgium won the toss and elected to field.
- Iain Latin and Kayron Stagno (Gib) both made their T20I debuts.

28 June 2022
16:00
Scorecard

Denmark; 190/4 (20 overs)	v	Hungary; 102 (15 overs)
Taranjit Bharaj 63 (33); Harshvardhan Mandhyan 2/32 (4 overs)		Khaibar Deldar 24 (17); Nicolaj Laegsgaard 3/21 (3 overs)

Denmark won by 88 runs
Ghent Oval, Ghent
Umpires: Vinay Malhotra (Ger) and Adriaan van den Dries (Ned)
Player of the match: Taranjit Bharaj (Den)

- Denmark won the toss and elected to bat.

29 June 2022
11:00
Scorecard

Denmark; 256/5 (20 overs)	v	Gibraltar; 124/8 (20 overs)
Nicolaj Laegsgaard 91 (42); James Fitzgerald 2/30 (3 overs)		Philip Raikes 35 (35); Hamid Shah 2/5 (2 overs)

Denmark won by 132 runs
Royal Brussels Cricket Club, Waterloo
Umpires: Rizwan Akram (Ned) and Vinay Malhotra (Ger)
Player of the match: Nicolaj Laegsgaard (Den)

- Denmark won the toss and elected to bat.
- Ian Farrell (Gib) made his T20I debut.

29 June 2022
16:00
Scorecard

Hungary; 120/9 (20 overs)	v	Belgium; 123/8 (19.4 overs)
Satyadeep Ashwathnarayana 52 (37); Sajad Ahmadzai 3/22 (4 overs)		Saber Zakhil 37 (25); Mark Fontaine 2/15 (2 overs)

Belgium won by 2 wickets
Royal Brussels Cricket Club, Waterloo
Umpires: Vinay Malhotra (Ger) and Adriaan van den Dries (Ned)
Player of the match: Murid Ekrami (Bel)

- Hungary won the toss and elected to bat.

1 July 2022
11:00
Scorecard

Hungary; 134/8 (20 overs)	v	Gibraltar; 135/6 (19.4 overs)
Sandeep Mohandas 26* (20); Iain Latin 4/25 (4 overs)		Avinash Pai 46 (46); Zeeshan Kukikhel 2/18 (4 overs)

Gibraltar won by 4 wickets
Royal Brussels Cricket Club, Waterloo
Umpires: Rizwan Akram (Ned) and Mark Jameson (Ger)
Player of the match: Iain Latin (Gib)

- Gibraltar won the toss and elected to field.

1 July 2022
16:00
Scorecard

Belgium; 161/9 (20 overs)	v	Denmark; 149/9 (20 overs)
Saber Zakhil 27 (18); Nicolaj Laegsgaard 2/25 (4 overs)		Hamid Shah 58 (48); Ahmad Khalid Ahmadzai 3/30 (4 overs)

Belgium won by 12 runs
Royal Brussels Cricket Club, Waterloo
Umpires: Rizwan Akram (Ned) and Ryan Milne (Sco)
Player of the match: Murid Ekrami (Bel)

- Denmark won the toss and elected to field.
- Saud Munir (Den) made his T20I debut.

Group 2

Pos	Team	Pld	W	L	NR	Pts	NRR	Qualification
1	Spain	3	3	0	0	6	2.682	Advanced to the semi-finals
2	Portugal	3	2	1	0	4	−0.281	Advanced to the semi-finals
3	Malta	3	1	2	0	2	−0.111	Advanced to the 5th place semi-finals
4	Israel	3	0	3	0	0	−1.889	Advanced to the 5th place semi-finals

Source: ESPNcricinfo

28 June 2022
11:00
Scorecard

Malta; 148/8 (20 overs)	v	Spain; 150/4 (18.4 overs)
Basil George 36 (23); Mohammad Kamran 2/20 (4 overs)		Yasir Ali 65* (61); Bikram Arora 1/14 (2 overs)

Spain won by 6 wickets
Royal Brussels Cricket Club, Waterloo
Umpires: Jonathan Kennedy (Ire) and Ryan Milne (Sco)
Player of the match: Yasir Ali (Esp)

- Spain won the toss and elected to field.

28 June 2022
16:00
Scorecard

Portugal; 155/8 (20 overs)	v	Israel; 108/6 (20 overs)
Kuldeep Gholiya 39 (29); Niv Nagavkar 2/19 (3 overs)		Michael Cohen 27* (29); Amandeep Singh 3/11 (4 overs)

Portugal won by 47 runs
Royal Brussels Cricket Club, Waterloo
Umpires: Mark Jameson (Ger) and Ryan Milne (Sco)
Player of the match: Amandeep Singh (Por)

- Israel won the toss and elected to field.
- Abraham Amado, Shailesh Bangera, Michael Cohen, Josh Evans, Eitamar Kahamker, Niv Nagavkar, Yair Nagavkar, Eliezar Samson, Gabriel Schachat, Eshkol Solomon, Elan Talker (Isr), Syed Maisam Ali and Kuldeep Gholiya (Por) all made their T20I debuts.

29 June 2022
11:00
Scorecard

Portugal; 154/8 (20 overs)	v	Malta; 143/8 (20 overs)
Amir Zaib 37 (33); Varun Thamotharam 3/25 (3 overs)		Varun Thamotharam 57 (41); Najjam Shahzad 3/25 (4 overs)

Portugal won by 11 runs
Ghent Oval, Ghent
Umpires: Mark Jameson (Ger) and Ryan Milne (Sco)
Player of the match: Varun Thamotharam (Mlt)

- Portugal won the toss and elected to bat.
- Sharn Gomes (Por) made his T20I debut.

29 June 2022
16:00
Scorecard

Israel; 114/9 (20 overs)	v	Spain; 115/3 (13.3 overs)
Eshkol Solomon 25 (26); Yasir Ali 2/12 (2 overs)		Hamza Dar 39* (27); Eliezar Samson 1/12 (2 overs)

Spain won by 7 wickets
Ghent Oval, Ghent
Umpires: Mark Jameson (Ger) and Jonathan Kennedy (Ire)
Player of the match: Hamza Dar (Esp)

- Israel won the toss and elected to bat.
- Tomer Kahamker (Isr) and Mohammad Atif (Esp) both made their T20I debuts.

1 July 2022
11:00
Scorecard

Portugal; 77 (17.2 overs)	v	Spain; 78/2 (9 overs)
Kuldeep Gholiya 19 (20); Yasir Ali 3/8 (4 overs)		Daniel Doyle-Calle 28 (18); Najjam Shahzad 1/11 (2 overs)

Spain won by 8 wickets
Ghent Oval, Ghent
Umpires: Jonathan Kennedy (Ire) and Adriaan van den Dries (Ned)
Player of the match: Yasir Ali (Esp)

- Portugal won the toss and elected to bat.

1 July 2022
16:00
Scorecard

Malta; 136 (19.4 overs)	v	Israel; 120/7 (20 overs)
Heinrich Gericke 48 (26); Josh Evans 3/22 (4 overs)		Yogev Nagavkar 39 (41); Varun Thamotharam 3/22 (4 overs)

Malta won by 16 runs
Ghent Oval, Ghent
Umpires: Jonathan Kennedy (Ire) and Vinay Malhotra (Ger)
Player of the match: Heinrich Gericke (Mlt)

- Israel won the toss and elected to field.
- Levi Kamarlekar and Yogev Nagavkar (Isr) both made their T20I debuts.

=== Qualifier C consolation playoffs ===
Following a car accident on 1 July 2022 that involved three match officials, the ICC rescheduled the consolation playoff matches.

5th place semi-final 1
2 July 2022
11:00
Scorecard

Gibraltar	v	Israel

Match abandoned
Ghent Oval, Ghent

- No toss.
- The match was cancelled due to a car accident involving the match officials.

5th place semi-final 2
2 July 2022
16:00
Scorecard

Hungary	v	Malta

Match abandoned
Ghent Oval, Ghent

- No toss.
- The match was cancelled due to a car accident involving the match officials.

7th place playoff
3 July 2022
11:00
Scorecard

Israel; 166/6 (20 overs)	v	Hungary; 154/9 (20 overs)
Gabriel Schachat 66 (53); Harshvardhan Mandhyan 2/24 (4 overs)		Asanka Weligamage 45 (33); Tomer Kahamker 3/10 (2 overs)

Israel won by 12 runs
Royal Brussels Cricket Club, Waterloo
Umpires: Jonathan Kennedy (Ire) and Vinay Malhotra (Ger)
Player of the match: Gabriel Schachat (Isr)

- Hungary won the toss and elected to field.

5th place playoff
3 July 2022
16:00
Scorecard

Gibraltar; 190/8 (20 overs)	v	Malta; 196/3 (16.3 overs)
Louis Bruce 55 (47); Bilal Muhammad 2/24 (4 overs)		Basil George 93* (44); Mark Gouws 1/16 (2 overs)

Malta won by 7 wickets
Royal Brussels Cricket Club, Waterloo
Umpires: Vinay Malhotra (Ger) and Adriaan van den Dries (Ned)
Player of the match: Basil George (Mlt)

- Gibraltar won the toss and elected to bat.

=== Qualifier C playoffs ===
Semi-final 1
2 July 2022
11:00
Scorecard

Belgium; 113 (18.4 overs)	v	Portugal; 114/2 (16.1 overs)
Muhammad Muneeb 40 (35); Syed Maisam Ali 4/25 (3.4 overs)		Sharn Gomes 52* (50); Sheraz Sheikh 1/16 (3.1 overs)

Portugal won by 8 wickets
Royal Brussels Cricket Club, Waterloo
Umpires: Jonathan Kennedy (Ire) and Adriaan van den Dries (Ned)
Player of the match: Sharn Gomes (Por)

- Belgium won the toss and elected to bat.

Semi-final 2
2 July 2022
16:00
Scorecard

Denmark; 154/7 (20 overs)	v	Spain; 113 (16.1 overs)
Nicolaj Laegsgaard 45 (32); Raja Adeel 2/27 (3 overs)		Christian Munoz-Mills 33 (17); Hamid Shah 3/20 (3 overs)

Denmark won by 41 runs
Royal Brussels Cricket Club, Waterloo
Umpires: Vinay Malhotra (Ger) and Adriaan van den Dries (Ned)
Player of the match: Hamid Shah (Den)

- Spain won the toss and elected to field.

3rd place playoff
4 July 2022
11:00
Scorecard

Spain; 145/9 (20 overs)	v	Belgium; 149/5 (20 overs)
Lorne Burns 47 (39); Khalid Ahmadi 3/19 (4 overs)		Ali Raza 50 (29); Zulqarnain Haider 2/26 (4 overs)

Belgium won by 5 wickets
Royal Brussels Cricket Club, Waterloo
Umpires: Jonathan Kennedy (Ire) and Adriaan van den Dries (Ned)
Player of the match: Shaheryar Butt (Bel)

- Spain won the toss and elected to bat.

Final
4 July 2022
16:00
Scorecard

Portugal; 110/9 (20 overs)	v	Denmark; 111/1 (13.1 overs)
Francoise Stoman 28 (41); Nicolaj Laegsgaard 2/11 (4 overs)		Taranjit Bharaj 58* (43); Junaid Khan 1/20 (2 overs)

Denmark won by 9 wickets
Royal Brussels Cricket Club, Waterloo
Umpires: Jonathan Kennedy (Ire) and Adriaan van den Dries (Ned)
Player of the match: Taranjit Bharaj (Den)

- Portugal won the toss and elected to bat.
