= International cricket in 2016 =

International cricket season

The 2016 international cricket season was from May 2016 to September 2016.

== Season overview ==
Men's international tours
Start date	Home team	Away team	Results [Matches]				
Start date	Home team	Away team	Test	ODI	T20I	FC	LA
19 May 2016	England	Sri Lanka	2–0 [3]	3–0 [5]	1–0 [1]	—	—
28 May 2016	PNG	Kenya	—	—	—	—	2–0 [2]
11 June 2016	Zimbabwe	India	—	0–3 [3]	1–2 [3]	—	—
16 June 2016	Ireland	Sri Lanka	—	0–2 [2]	—	—	—
4 July 2016	Scotland	Afghanistan	—	0–1 [2]	—	—	—
10 July 2016	Ireland	Afghanistan	—	2–2 [5]	—	—	—
14 July 2016	England	Pakistan	2–2 [4]	4–1 [5]	0–1 [1]	—	—
21 July 2016	West Indies	India	0–2 [4]	—	1–0 [2]	—	—
26 July 2016	Sri Lanka	Australia	3–0 [3]	1–4 [5]	0–2 [2]	—	—
28 July 2016	Zimbabwe	New Zealand	0–2 [2]	—	—	—	—
29 July 2016	Netherlands	Afghanistan	—	—	—	0–1 [1]	—
9 August 2016	Scotland	UAE	—	2–0 [2]	—	0–0 [1]	—
13 August 2016	Netherlands	Nepal	—	—	—	—	1–1 [2]
18 August 2016	Ireland	Pakistan	—	0–1 [2]	—	—	—
19 August 2016	South Africa	New Zealand	1–0 [2]	—	—	—	—
30 August 2016	Ireland	Hong Kong	—	—	0–1 [2]	1–0 [1]	—
8 September 2016	Scotland	Hong Kong	—	1–0 [2]	—	—	—
Men's international tournaments
Start date	Tournament				Winners		
21 May 2016	(Jersey) 2016 ICC World Cricket League Division Five				Jersey		
3 June 2016	(Cricket West Indies) 2016 West Indies Tri-Series				Australia		
17 August 2016	(Sweden) 2016 ICC Europe Division Two				Germany		

Women's international tours
Start date	Home team	Away team	Results [Matches]	
Start date	Home team	Away team	WODI	WT20I
20 June 2016	England	Pakistan	3–0 [3]	3–0 [3]
1 August 2016	Ireland	South Africa	1–3 [4]	1–1 [2]
5 September 2016	Ireland	Bangladesh	0–1 [3]	1–0 [2]

== Rankings ==
The following are the rankings at the beginning of the season:

ICC Test Championship 3 May 2016
Rank	Team	Matches	Points	Rating
1	Australia	32	3765	118
2	India	20	2238	112
3	Pakistan	20	2227	111
4	England	32	3370	105
5	New Zealand	25	2449	98
6	South Africa	22	2015	92
7	Sri Lanka	24	2113	88
8	West Indies	21	1374	65
9	Bangladesh	12	687	57
10	Zimbabwe	4	48	12

ICC ODI Championship 4 May 2016
Rank	Team	Matches	Points	Rating
1	Australia	34	4226	124
2	New Zealand	41	4631	113
3	South Africa	41	4575	112
4	India	45	4919	109
5	Sri Lanka	45	4698	104
6	England	42	4324	103
7	Bangladesh	24	2347	98
8	West Indies	23	2033	88
9	Pakistan	42	3644	87
10	Afghanistan	19	961	51
11	Zimbabwe	43	2003	47
12	Ireland	11	467	42

ICC T20I Championship 4 May 2016
Rank	Team	Matches	Points	Rating
1	New Zealand	20	2635	132
2	India	22	2894	132
3	West Indies	18	2192	122
4	South Africa	23	2734	119
5	England	20	2279	114
6	Australia	19	2099	110
7	Pakistan	28	2924	104
8	Sri Lanka	25	2444	98
9	Afghanistan	22	1725	78
10	Bangladesh	23	1708	74
11	Netherlands	10	667	67
12	Zimbabwe	19	1105	58
13	Scotland	11	622	57
14	United Arab Emirates	14	757	54
15	Ireland	11	526	48
16	Oman	12	442	37
17	Hong Kong	15	440	29
Insufficient matches
	Papua New Guinea	5	—	44

ICC Women's Rankings 17 April 2016
Rank	Team	Matches	Points	Rating
1	Australia	59	7524	128
2	England	50	6161	123
3	New Zealand	56	6424	115
4	India	45	4827	107
5	West Indies	60	6263	104
6	South Africa	56	5190	93
7	Pakistan	51	4145	81
8	Sri Lanka	55	3922	71
9	Bangladesh	22	985	45
10	Ireland	20	573	29

== May ==
=== Sri Lanka in England ===
Test series
No.	Date	Home captain	Away captain	Venue	Result
Test 2203	19–23 May	Alastair Cook	Angelo Mathews	Headingley, Leeds	England by an innings and 88 runs
Test 2204	27–31 May	Alastair Cook	Angelo Mathews	Riverside Ground, Chester-le-Street	England by 9 wickets
Test 2205	9–13 June	Alastair Cook	Angelo Mathews	Lord's, London	Match drawn
ODI series
No.	Date	Home captain	Away captain	Venue	Result
ODI 3751	21 June	Eoin Morgan	Angelo Mathews	Trent Bridge, Nottingham	Match tied
ODI 3753	24 June	Eoin Morgan	Angelo Mathews	Edgbaston, Birmingham	England by 10 wickets
ODI 3755	26 June	Eoin Morgan	Angelo Mathews	Bristol County Ground, Bristol	No result
ODI 3757	29 June	Eoin Morgan	Angelo Mathews	The Oval, London	England by 6 wickets (DLS)
ODI 3758	2 July	Eoin Morgan	Angelo Mathews	Sophia Gardens, Cardiff	England by 122 runs
T20I series
No.	Date	Home captain	Away captain	Venue	Result
T20I 561	5 July	Eoin Morgan	Angelo Mathews	Rose Bowl, Southampton	England by 8 wickets

=== 2016 ICC World Cricket League Division Five ===
Group stage
No.	Date	Team 1	Captain 1	Team 2	Captain 2	Venue	Result
Match 1	21 May	Jersey	Peter Gough	Oman	Ajay Lalcheta	Grainville Cricket Ground, Saint Saviour	No result
Match 2	21 May	Nigeria	Kunle Adegbola	Tanzania	Shaheed Dhanani	Farmers Cricket Club Ground, Saint Martin	Nigeria by 6 wickets
Match 3	21 May	Guernsey	Jamie Nussbaumer	Vanuatu	Andrew Mansale	FB Playing Fields, Saint Clement	Guernsey by 5 runs (DLS)
Match 4	22 May	Jersey	Peter Gough	Vanuatu	Andrew Mansale	Grainville Cricket Ground, Saint Saviour	Jersey by 102 runs
Match 5	22 May	Guernsey	Jamie Nussbaumer	Tanzania	Shaheed Dhanani	Farmers Cricket Club Ground, Saint Martin	Guernsey by 8 wickets
Match 6	22 May	Nigeria	Kunle Adegbola	Oman	Ajay Lalcheta	FB Playing Fields, Saint Clement	Oman by 181 runs
Match 7	23 May	Jersey	Peter Gough	Oman	Ajay Lalcheta	Grainville Cricket Ground, Saint Saviour	Oman by 58 runs
Match 8	24 May	Jersey	Peter Gough	Tanzania	Shaheed Dhanani	FB Playing Fields, Saint Clement	Jersey by 85 runs
Match 9	24 May	Guernsey	Jamie Nussbaumer	Nigeria	Kunle Adegbola	Grainville Cricket Ground, Saint Saviour	Guernsey by 10 wickets
Match 10	24 May	Oman	Ajay Lalcheta	Vanuatu	Andrew Mansale	Farmers Cricket Club Ground, Saint Martin	Oman by 9 wickets
Match 11	25 May	Oman	Ajay Lalcheta	Tanzania	Shaheed Dhanani	Grainville Cricket Ground, Saint Saviour	Oman by 9 wickets
Match 12	25 May	Jersey	Peter Gough	Guernsey	Jamie Nussbaumer	Farmers Cricket Club Ground, Saint Martin	Jersey by 7 wickets
Match 13	25 May	Nigeria	Kunle Adegbola	Vanuatu	Andrew Mansale	FB Playing Fields, Saint Clement	Vanuatu by 110 runs
Match 14	27 May	Tanzania	Shaheed Dhanani	Vanuatu	Andrew Mansale	Grainville Cricket Ground, Saint Saviour	Tanzania by 7 wickets
Match 15	27 May	Jersey	Peter Gough	Nigeria	Kunle Adegbola	Farmers Cricket Club Ground, Saint Martin	Jersey by 10 wickets
Match 16	27 May	Guernsey	Ben Ferbrache	Oman	Ajay Lalcheta	FB Playing Fields, Saint Clement	Oman by 2 wickets
Playoffs
Match 17	28 May	Nigeria	Kunle Adegbola	Tanzania	Shaheed Dhanani	FB Playing Fields, Saint Clement	Tanzania by 1 wicket
Match 18	28 May	Guernsey	Ben Ferbrache	Vanuatu	Andrew Mansale	Farmers Cricket Club Ground, Saint Martin	Guernsey by 19 runs
Match 19	28 May	Jersey	Peter Gough	Oman	Ajay Lalcheta	Grainville Cricket Ground, Saint Saviour	Jersey by 44 runs

==== Final standings ====
Pos	Team	Status
1st	Jersey	Promoted to 2016 ICC World Cricket League Division Four
2nd	Oman	Promoted to 2016 ICC World Cricket League Division Four
3rd	Guernsey	Remained in Division Five
4th	Vanuatu	Relegated to regional tournaments
5th	Tanzania	Relegated to regional tournaments
6th	Nigeria	Relegated to regional tournaments

=== Kenya in Papua New Guinea ===
2015–17 ICC World Cricket League Championship - List A series
No.	Date	Home captain	Away captain	Venue	Result
1st List A	28 May	Jack Vare	Rakep Patel	Amini Park, Port Moresby	Papua New Guinea by 6 wickets
2nd List A	30 May	Jack Vare	Rakep Patel	Amini Park, Port Moresby	Papua New Guinea by 21 runs

== June ==
=== 2016 West Indies Tri-Series ===
Pos	Team	Pld	W	L	T	NR	Pts	NRR
1	Australia	6	3	2	0	1	15	0.383
2	West Indies	6	3	3	0	0	13	−0.460
3	South Africa	6	2	3	0	1	12	0.155

Source: ESPNcricinfo

Qualified for the Final

Group stage
No.	Date	Team 1	Captain 1	Team 2	Captain 2	Venue	Result
ODI 3739	3 June	West Indies	Jason Holder	South Africa	AB de Villiers	Providence Stadium, Providence	West Indies by 4 wickets
ODI 3740	5 June	West Indies	Jason Holder	Australia	Steve Smith	Providence Stadium, Providence	Australia by 6 wickets
ODI 3741	7 June	Australia	Steve Smith	South Africa	AB de Villiers	Providence Stadium, Providence	South Africa by 47 runs
ODI 3743	11 June	Australia	Steve Smith	South Africa	AB de Villiers	Warner Park, Basseterre	Australia by 36 runs
ODI 3745	13 June	West Indies	Jason Holder	Australia	Steve Smith	Warner Park, Basseterre	West Indies by 4 wickets
ODI 3747	15 June	West Indies	Jason Holder	South Africa	AB de Villiers	Warner Park, Basseterre	South Africa by 139 runs
ODI 3750	19 June	Australia	Steve Smith	South Africa	AB de Villiers	Kensington Oval, Bridgetown	No result
ODI 3752	21 June	West Indies	Jason Holder	Australia	Steve Smith	Kensington Oval, Bridgetown	Australia by 6 wickets
ODI 3754	24 June	West Indies	Jason Holder	South Africa	AB de Villiers	Kensington Oval, Bridgetown	West Indies by 100 runs
Final
ODI 3756	26 June	West Indies	Jason Holder	Australia	Steve Smith	Kensington Oval, Bridgetown	Australia by 58 runs

=== India in Zimbabwe ===
ODI series
No.	Date	Home captain	Away captain	Venue	Result
ODI 3742	11 June	Graeme Cremer	MS Dhoni	Harare Sports Club, Harare	India by 9 wickets
ODI 3744	13 June	Graeme Cremer	MS Dhoni	Harare Sports Club, Harare	India by 8 wickets
ODI 3746	15 June	Graeme Cremer	MS Dhoni	Harare Sports Club, Harare	India by 10 wickets
T20I series
No.	Date	Home captain	Away captain	Venue	Result
T20I 558	18 June	Graeme Cremer	MS Dhoni	Harare Sports Club, Harare	Zimbabwe by 2 runs
T20I 559	20 June	Graeme Cremer	MS Dhoni	Harare Sports Club, Harare	India by 10 wickets
T20I 560	22 June	Graeme Cremer	MS Dhoni	Harare Sports Club, Harare	India by 3 runs

=== Sri Lanka in Ireland ===
ODI series
No.	Date	Home captain	Away captain	Venue	Result
ODI 3748	16 June	William Porterfield	Angelo Mathews	Malahide Cricket Club Ground, Dublin	Sri Lanka by 76 runs (DLS)
ODI 3749	18 June	William Porterfield	Angelo Mathews	Malahide Cricket Club Ground, Dublin	Sri Lanka by 136 runs

=== Pakistan Women in England ===
2014–16 ICC Women's Championship - WODI series
No.	Date	Home captain	Away captain	Venue	Result
WODI 983	20–21 June	Heather Knight	Sana Mir	Grace Road, Leicester	England by 7 wickets
WODI 984	22 June	Heather Knight	Sana Mir	New Road, Worcester	England by 212 runs
WODI 985	27 June	Heather Knight	Sana Mir	County Ground, Taunton	England by 202 runs
WT20I series
No.	Date	Home captain	Away captain	Venue	Result
WT20I 363	3 July	Heather Knight	Bismah Maroof	Bristol County Ground, Bristol	England by 68 runs
WT20I 364	5 July	Heather Knight	Bismah Maroof	Rose Bowl, Southampton	England by 35 runs
WT20I 365	7 July	Heather Knight	Bismah Maroof	County Cricket Ground, Chelmsford	England by 57 runs

== July ==
=== Afghanistan in Scotland ===
ODI series
No.	Date	Home captain	Away captain	Venue	Result
ODI 3759	4 July	Preston Mommsen	Asghar Stanikzai	The Grange Club, Edinburgh	No result
ODI 3760	6 July	Preston Mommsen	Asghar Stanikzai	The Grange Club, Edinburgh	Afghanistan by 78 runs (DLS)

=== Afghanistan in Ireland ===
ODI series
No.	Date	Home captain	Away captain	Venue	Result
ODI 3760a	10 July	William Porterfield	Asghar Stanikzai	Stormont, Belfast	Match abandoned
ODI 3761	12 July	William Porterfield	Asghar Stanikzai	Stormont, Belfast	Afghanistan by 39 runs
ODI 3762	14 July	William Porterfield	Asghar Stanikzai	Stormont, Belfast	Ireland by 6 wickets
ODI 3763	17 July	William Porterfield	Asghar Stanikzai	Stormont, Belfast	Afghanistan by 79 runs
ODI 3764	19 July	William Porterfield	Asghar Stanikzai	Stormont, Belfast	Ireland by 12 runs

=== Pakistan in England ===
Test series
No.	Date	Home captain	Away captain	Venue	Result
Test 2206	14–18 July	Alastair Cook	Misbah-ul-Haq	Lord's, London	Pakistan by 75 runs
Test 2208	22–26 July	Alastair Cook	Misbah-ul-Haq	Old Trafford Cricket Ground, Manchester	England by 330 runs
Test 2212	3–7 August	Alastair Cook	Misbah-ul-Haq	Edgbaston Cricket Ground, Birmingham	England by 141 runs
Test 2216	11–15 August	Alastair Cook	Misbah-ul-Haq	The Oval, London	Pakistan by 10 wickets
ODI series
No.	Date	Home captain	Away captain	Venue	Result
ODI 3770	24 August	Eoin Morgan	Azhar Ali	Rose Bowl, Southampton	England by 44 runs (DLS)
ODI 3771	27 August	Eoin Morgan	Azhar Ali	Lord's, London	England by 4 wickets
ODI 3773	30 August	Eoin Morgan	Azhar Ali	Trent Bridge, Nottingham	England by 169 runs
ODI 3775	1 September	Eoin Morgan	Azhar Ali	Headingley, Leeds	England by 4 wickets
ODI 3777	4 September	Eoin Morgan	Azhar Ali	Sophia Gardens, Cardiff	Pakistan by 4 wickets
T20I series
No.	Date	Home captain	Away captain	Venue	Result
T20I 566	7 September	Eoin Morgan	Sarfaraz Ahmed	Old Trafford, Manchester	Pakistan by 9 wickets

=== India in West Indies and USA ===
Test series
No.	Date	Home captain	Away captain	Venue	Result
Test 2207	21–25 July	Jason Holder	Virat Kohli	Sir Vivian Richards Stadium, North Sound	India by an innings and 92 runs
Test 2211	30 July–3 August	Jason Holder	Virat Kohli	Sabina Park, Kingston	Match drawn
Test 2215	9–13 August	Jason Holder	Virat Kohli	Daren Sammy Cricket Ground, Gros Islet	India by 237 runs
Test 2218	18–22 August	Jason Holder	Virat Kohli	Queen's Park Oval, Port of Spain	Match drawn
T20I series in USA
No.	Date	India captain	West Indies captain	Venue	Result
T20I 562	27 August	MS Dhoni	Carlos Brathwaite	Central Broward Regional Park, Lauderhill	West Indies by 1 run
T20I 563	28 August	MS Dhoni	Carlos Brathwaite	Central Broward Regional Park, Lauderhill	No result

=== Australia in Sri Lanka ===
2016 Warne–Muralidaran Trophy - Test series
No.	Date	Home captain	Away captain	Venue	Result
Test 2209	26–30 July	Angelo Mathews	Steve Smith	Pallekele International Cricket Stadium, Kandy	Sri Lanka by 106 runs
Test 2213	4–8 August	Angelo Mathews	Steve Smith	Galle International Stadium, Galle	Sri Lanka by 229 runs
Test 2217	13–17 August	Angelo Mathews	Steve Smith	Sinhalese Sports Club Ground, Colombo	Sri Lanka by 163 runs
ODI series
No.	Date	Home captain	Away captain	Venue	Result
ODI 3768	21 August	Angelo Mathews	Steve Smith	R Premadasa Stadium, Colombo	Australia by 3 wickets
ODI 3769	24 August	Angelo Mathews	Steve Smith	R Premadasa Stadium, Colombo	Sri Lanka by 82 runs
ODI 3772	28 August	Angelo Mathews	David Warner	Rangiri Dambulla International Stadium, Dambulla	Australia by 2 wickets
ODI 3774	31 August	Angelo Mathews	David Warner	Rangiri Dambulla International Stadium, Dambulla	Australia by 6 wickets
ODI 3776	4 September	Dinesh Chandimal	David Warner	Pallekele International Cricket Stadium, Kandy	Australia by 5 wickets
T20I series
No.	Date	Home captain	Away captain	Venue	Result
T20I 565	6 September	Dinesh Chandimal	David Warner	Pallekele International Cricket Stadium, Kandy	Australia by 85 runs
T20I 567	9 September	Dinesh Chandimal	David Warner	R Premadasa Stadium, Colombo	Australia by 4 wickets

=== New Zealand in Zimbabwe ===
Test series
No.	Date	Home captain	Away captain	Venue	Result
Test 2210	28 July–1 August	Graeme Cremer	Kane Williamson	Queens Sports Club, Bulawayo	New Zealand by an innings and 117 runs
Test 2214	6 August–10 August	Graeme Cremer	Kane Williamson	Queens Sports Club, Bulawayo	New Zealand by 254 runs

=== Afghanistan in Netherlands ===
2015–17 ICC Intercontinental Cup - FC series
No.	Date	Home captain	Away captain	Venue	Result
First-class	29 July–1 August	Peter Borren	Asghar Stanikzai	Sportpark Westvliet, Voorburg	Afghanistan by an innings and 36 runs

== August ==
=== South Africa Women in Ireland ===
WT20I series
No.	Date	Home captain	Away captain	Venue	Result
WT20I 366	1 August	Laura Delany	Dinesha Devnarain	Claremont Road Cricket Ground, Dublin	South Africa by 4 wickets
WT20I 367	3 August	Laura Delany	Dinesha Devnarain	Claremont Road Cricket Ground, Dublin	Ireland by 20 runs
WODI series
No.	Date	Home captain	Away captain	Venue	Result
WODI 986	5 August	Laura Delany	Dinesha Devnarain	Anglesea Road, Dublin	South Africa by 89 runs
WODI 987	7 August	Laura Delany	Dinesha Devnarain	Claremont Road Cricket Ground, Dublin	South Africa by 68 runs
WODI 988	9 August	Laura Delany	Dinesha Devnarain	Malahide Cricket Club Ground, Dublin	South Africa by 67 runs
WODI 989	11 August	Laura Delany	Dinesha Devnarain	The Vineyard, Dublin	Ireland by 7 wickets

=== United Arab Emirates in Scotland ===
2015–17 ICC Intercontinental Cup - FC series
No.	Date	Home captain	Away captain	Venue	Result
First-class	9–12 August	Preston Mommsen	Ahmed Raza	Cambusdoon New Ground, Ayr	Match drawn
2015–17 ICC World Cricket League Championship - ODI series
No.	Date	Home captain	Away captain	Venue	Result
ODI 3765	14 August	Preston Mommsen	Ahmed Raza	The Grange Club, Edinburgh	Scotland by 98 runs
ODI 3766	16 August	Preston Mommsen	Ahmed Raza	The Grange Club, Edinburgh	Scotland by 7 wickets

=== Nepal in Netherlands ===
2015–17 ICC World Cricket League Championship - List A series
No.	Date	Home captain	Away captain	Venue	Result
1st List A	13 August	Peter Borren	Paras Khadka	VRA Cricket Ground, Amstelveen	Netherlands by 7 wickets
2nd List A	15 August	Peter Borren	Paras Khadka	VRA Cricket Ground, Amstelveen	Nepal by 19 runs

=== 2016 ICC Europe Division Two ===
Pos	Team	Pld	W	L	T	NR	Pts	NRR
1	Germany	5	3	0	0	2	8	3.070
2	Sweden	5	2	1	0	2	6	2.126
3	Spain	5	2	1	0	2	6	0.540
4	Israel	5	2	1	0	2	6	0.284
5	Isle of Man	5	1	2	0	2	4	−1.891
6	Gibraltar	5	0	5	0	0	0	−2.060

Source: ESPNcricinfo

Group stage
No.	Date	Team 1	Captain 1	Team 2	Captain 2	Venue	Result
Match 1	17 August	Isle of Man	Philip Littlejohns	Germany	Brandon Ess	Skarpnack 2, Stockholm	Germany by 100 runs
Match 2	17 August	Israel	Emanuel Solomon	Gibraltar	Kieron Ferrary	Skarpnack 1, Stockholm	Israel by 5 wickets
Match 3	17 August	Sweden	Azam Khalil	Spain	Christian Munoz-Mills	Gardet, Stockholm	Sweden by 6 wickets
Match 4	17 August	Sweden	Azam Khalil	Germany	Brandon Ess	Gardet, Stockholm	Germany by 7 runs (DLS)
Match 5	17 August	Isle of Man	Philip Littlejohns	Gibraltar	Kieron Ferrary	Skarpnack 1, Stockholm	Isle of Man by 9 wickets (DLS)
Match 6	17 August	Israel	Emanuel Solomon	Spain	Christian Munoz-Mills	Skarpnack 2, Stockholm	Spain by 7 wickets
Match 7	19 August	Germany	Brandon Ess	Gibraltar	Kieron Ferrary	Gardet, Stockholm	Germany by 8 wickets
Match 8	19 August	Germany	Brandon Ess	Spain	Christian Munoz-Mills	Skarpnack 1, Stockholm	Match abandoned
Match 9	19 August	Sweden	Azam Khalil	Gibraltar	Kieron Ferrary	Skarpnack 2, Stockholm	Match abandoned
Match 10	19 August	Isle of Man	Philip Littlejohns	Israel	Emanuel Solomon	Gardet, Stockholm	Israel by 10 runs
Match 11	20 August	Isle of Man	Philip Littlejohns	Spain	Christian Munoz-Mills	Skarpnack 2, Stockholm	Match abandoned
Match 12	20 August	Sweden	Azam Khalil	Israel	Emanuel Solomon	Skarpnack 1, Stockholm	Match abandoned
Match 13	20 August	Gibraltar	Kieron Ferrary	Spain	Christian Munoz-Mills	Gardet, Stockholm	Spain by 7 runs
Match 14	20 August	Sweden	Azam Khalil	Isle of Man	Philip Littlejohns	Skarpnack 1, Stockholm	Match abandoned
Match 15	20 August	Germany	Brandon Ess	Israel	Emanuel Solomon	Skarpnack 2, Stockholm	Match abandoned
Match 16	19 August	Germany	Brandon Ess	Spain	Christian Munoz-Mills	Skarpnack 1, Stockholm	Match abandoned
Match 17	19 August	Sweden	Azam Khalil	Gibraltar	Kieron Ferrary	Gardet, Stockholm	Sweden by 95 runs

==== Final standings ====
Pos	Team	Status
1st	Germany	Promoted to 2017 ICC Europe Division One
2nd	Sweden	Promoted to 2017 ICC Europe Division One
3rd	Spain	
4th	Israel	
5th	Isle of Man	
6th	Gibraltar	

=== Pakistan in Ireland ===
ODI series
No.	Date	Home captain	Away captain	Venue	Result
ODI 3767	18 August	William Porterfield	Azhar Ali	Malahide Cricket Club Ground, Dublin	Pakistan by 255 runs
ODI 3767a	20 August	William Porterfield	Azhar Ali	Malahide Cricket Club Ground, Dublin	Match abandoned

=== New Zealand in South Africa ===
Test series
No.	Date	Home captain	Away captain	Venue	Result
Test 2219	19–23 August	Faf du Plessis	Kane Williamson	Kingsmead Cricket Ground, Durban	Match drawn
Test 2220	27–31 August	Faf du Plessis	Kane Williamson	Centurion Park, Centurion	South Africa by 204 runs

=== Hong Kong in Ireland ===
2015–17 ICC Intercontinental Cup - FC series
No.	Date	Home captain	Away captain	Venue	Result
First-class	30 August–2 September	William Porterfield	Babar Hayat	Stormont, Belfast	Ireland by 70 runs
T20I series
No.	Date	Home captain	Away captain	Venue	Result
T20I 564	5 September	William Porterfield	Babar Hayat	Bready Cricket Club Ground, Magheramason	Hong Kong by 40 runs
T20I 565a	6 September	William Porterfield	Babar Hayat	Bready Cricket Club Ground, Magheramason	Match abandoned

== September ==
=== Bangladesh Women in Ireland ===
WT20I series
No.	Date	Home captain	Away captain	Venue	Result
WT20I 368	5 September	Laura Delany	Jahanara Alam	Bready Cricket Club Ground, Magheramason	Ireland by 6 runs
WT20I 368a	6 September	Laura Delany	Jahanara Alam	Bready Cricket Club Ground, Magheramason	Match abandoned
WODI series
No.	Date	Home captain	Away captain	Venue	Result
WODI 989a	8 September	Laura Delany	Jahanara Alam	Bready Cricket Club Ground, Magheramason	Match abandoned
WODI 990	9 September	Laura Delany	Jahanara Alam	Shaw's Bridge Lower Ground, Belfast	No result
WODI 991	10 September	Laura Delany	Jahanara Alam	Shaw's Bridge Lower Ground, Belfast	Bangladesh by 10 runs

=== Hong Kong in Scotland ===
ODI series
No.	Date	Home captain	Away captain	Venue	Result
ODI 3778	8 September	Preston Mommsen	Babar Hayat	The Grange Club, Edinburgh	No result
ODI 3779	10 September	Preston Mommsen	Babar Hayat	The Grange Club, Edinburgh	Scotland by 53 runs
