= Maltese cricket team in Belgium in 2022 =

International cricket tour

	Belgium	Malta
- Dates: 11 – 12 June 2022
Captains	Sheraz Sheikh	Bikram Arora

Twenty20 International series
- Results: Belgium won the 3-match series 3–0
Most runs	Aziz Mohammad (137)	Varun Thamotharam (60)
Most wickets	Khalid Ahmadi (8)	Varun Thamotharam (7)

The Malta cricket team toured Belgium in June 2022 to play three Twenty20 International (T20I) matches. The series provided both sides with preparation for the 2022 ICC Men's T20 World Cup Europe sub-regional qualifier tournaments.

The hosts were on top from the start with an opening partnership of 135 runs in the first game, and they went on to win all three games convincingly.

== Squads ==
Belgium	Malta
Sheraz Sheikh (c); Maqsood Ahmad; Khalid Ahmadi; Saqlain Ali; Waqas Ali; Ahmad Khalid Ahmadzai; Sajad Ahmadzai; Fahim Bhatti; Shaheryar Butt (wk); Murid Ekrami; Omid Mailk Khel (wk); Aziz Mohammad; Muhammad Muneeb; Burhan Niaz; Rahimi Omid; Adnan Razzaq; Shagharai Sefat; Saber Zakhil	Bikram Arora (c); Imran Ameer; Ryan Bastiansz; Gopal Chaturvedi; Basil George; Jaison Jerome; Aaftab Alam Khan (wk); Zeeshan Khan; Bilal Muhammad; Jitesh Patel; Justin Shaju; Amar Sharma; Varun Thamotharam

== T20I series ==
=== 1st T20I ===
11 June 2022
10:00
Scorecard

Belgium; 233/6 (20 overs)	v	Malta; 122/8 (20 overs)
Muhammad Muneeb 73 (47); Varun Thamotharam 3/32 (3 overs)		Varun Thamotharam 57 (25); Shagharai Sefat 2/11 (4 overs)

Belgium won by 111 runs
Ghent Oval, Ghent
Umpires: Shashidhar Gunna (Bel) and Jahan Gir Jhan (Bel)

- Malta won the toss and elected to field.
- Ahmad Khalid Ahmadzai, Fahim Bhatti and Omid Mailk Khel (Bel) all made their T20I debuts.

=== 2nd T20I ===
11 June 2022
14:00
Scorecard

Belgium; 196/5 (20 overs)	v	Malta; 112 (19.5 overs)
Aziz Mohammad 46 (33); Varun Thamotharam 3/33 (4 overs)		Amar Sharma 34* (19); Khalid Ahmadi 4/38 (4 overs)

Belgium won by 84 runs
Ghent Oval, Ghent
Umpires: Rehman Hussain (Bel) and Jahan Gir Jhan (Bel)

- Belgium won the toss and elected to bat.
- Sajad Ahmadzai (Bel) and Ryan Bastiansz (Mlt) both made their T20I debuts.

=== 3rd T20I ===
12 June 2022
09:00
Scorecard

Belgium; 162 (20 overs)	v	Malta; 40 (13.3 overs)
Aziz Mohammad 35 (31); Bilal Muhammad 4/18 (4 overs)		Basil George 9 (12); Khalid Ahmadi 4/5 (4 overs)

Belgium won by 122 runs
Royal Brussels Cricket Club, Waterloo
Umpires: Umair Butt (Bel) and Jahan Gir Jhan (Bel)

- Belgium won the toss and elected to bat.
- Khalid Ahmadi (Bel) took his first hat-trick in T20Is.
