= List of Isle of Man Twenty20 International cricketers =

This is a list of Manx Twenty20 International cricketers.

In April 2018, the ICC decided to grant full Twenty20 International (T20I) status to all its members. Therefore, all Twenty20 matches played between Isle of Man and other ICC members after 1 January 2019 will be eligible for T20I status.

This list comprises all members of the Isle of Man cricket team who have played at least one T20I match. It is initially arranged in the order in which each player won his first Twenty20 cap. Where more than one player won his first Twenty20 cap in the same match, those players are listed alphabetically by surname.

Isle of Man played their first match with T20I status on 21 August 2020 against Guernsey during a tour of Guernsey.

== Key ==
General

- ‡ – Captain
- † – Wicket-keeper
- First – Year of debut
- Last – Year of latest game
- Mat – Number of matches played

Batting

- Runs – Runs scored in career
- HS – Highest score
- Avg – Runs scored per dismissal
- 50 – Half-centuries scored
- * – Batsman remained not out

Bowling

- Balls – Balls bowled in career
- Wkt – Wickets taken in career
- BBI – Best bowling in an innings
- Ave – Average runs per wicket

Fielding

- Ca – Catches taken
- St – Stumpings affected

== List of players ==
Statistics are correct as of 21 August 2026.

Isle of Man T20I cricketers
General					Batting				Bowling				Fielding		Ref
No.	Name	First	Last	Mat	Runs	HS	Avg	50	Balls	Wkt	BBI	Ave	Ca	St	Ref
1	Matthew Ansell‡	2020	2026	31	56	17	6.22	0	627	31	4/12	18.83	10	0	
2	George Burrows	2020	2024	21	484	69*	32.26	4	18	2	1/9	11.50	9	0	
3	Joseph Burrows	2020	2026	31	118	28	6.94	0	522	41	4/10	16.29	10	0	
4	Jacob Butler	2020	2026	17	20	8*	5.00	0	225	18	4/12	15.38	7	0	
5	Carl Hartmann‡†	2020	2026	31	451	39	18.79	0	–	–	–	–	13	2	
6	Nathan Knights	2020	2026	22	291	69	15.31	2	12	1	1/8	8.00	4	0	
7	Chris Langford	2020	2026	26	133	24*	13.30	0	439	24	3/10	20.45	4	0	
8	Corbin Liebenberg	2020	2026	10	5	4	1.66	0	150	10	4/20	18.60	4	0	
9	Adam McAuley	2020	2026	30	547	50	21.03	2	–	–	–	–	5	0	
10	Sam Mills	2020	2020	1	1	1*	–	0	–	–	–	–	0	0	
11	Oliver Webster‡	2020	2024	6	132	48	22.00	0	114	7	3/33	18.57	3	0	
12	Edward Beard	2021	2024	23	213	35	15.21	0	18	0	–	–	12	0	
13	Connor Smith (Note: Connor Smith also played T20I cricket for Malaysia. Only his records for Isle of Man are given above.)	2021	2021	4	17	13	8.50	0	72	3	3/15	25.00	2	0	
14	Alex Stokoe	2021	2021	4	4	4	4.00	0	72	3	2/15	22.33	1	0	
15	Dollin Jansen‡	2021	2026	21	370	86	26.42	2	136	4	1/7	40.50	15	0	
16	Kieran Cawte	2022	2024	14	1	1*	0.50	0	211	10	2/23	29.00	2	0	
17	Josh Clough	2022	2026	10	56	12	9.33	0	–	–	–	–	2	0	
18	Fraser Clarke	2023	2025	11	20	9*	4.00	0	183	7	2/14	30.71	1	0	
19	Edward Walker	2023	2023	5	3	2*	–	0	48	1	1/32	75.00	0	0	
20	Christian Webster	2023	2026	14	198	59*	18.00	1	–	–	–	–	4	0	
21	Luke Ward	2023	2025	7	77	17*	19.25	0	6	1	1/4	4.00	1	0	
22	Jerad Griffin	2023	2026	6	2	2	2.00	–	65	4	2/31	22.00	3	0	
23	Samuel Barnett	2024	2026	4	14	11	4.66	0	–	–	–	–	0	0	
24	Harry McAleer†	2024	2024	5	54	23	10.80	0	–	–	–	–	–	–	
25	Spencer Clarke	2024	2024	1	0	0	0.00	0	6	0	–	–	0	0	
26	George Newton	2026	2026	7	57	27*	57.00	0	141	6	3/13	20.66	2	0	
27	Kyle Shnier	2026	2026	1	–	–	–	–	–	–	–	–	0	0	
