= Jason Martin (cricketer) =

Guernsey cricketer (born 1995)

Personal information
- Born: 18 March 1995 (age 31)
- Batting: Right-handed
- Role: Wicket-keeper batter

International information
- National side: Guernsey
- T20I debut (cap 20): 21 August 2020 v Isle of Man
- Last T20I: 27 July 2022 v Austria

Career statistics
Competition	T20I
Matches	4
Runs scored	35
Batting average	35.00
100s/50s	0/0
Top score	19*
Catches/stumpings	1/4
- Source: ESPNcricinfo, 26 May 2026

Jason Martin (born 18 March 1995) is a professional cricketer who plays for Guernsey. He played in the 2016 ICC World Cricket League Division Five tournament. He made his Twenty20 International (T20I) debut for Guernsey against the Isle of Man on 21 August 2020, a match Guernsey won by 8 wickets.
