= List of France Twenty20 International cricketers =

This is a list of French Twenty20 International cricketers.

In April 2018, the ICC decided to grant full Twenty20 International (T20I) status to all its members. Therefore, all Twenty20 matches played between France and other ICC members after 1 January 2019 will be eligible for T20I status. France played their first T20I against the Norway on 5 August 2021 during the 2021 Germany Tri-Nation Series.

This list comprises all members of the France cricket team who have played at least one T20I match. It is initially arranged in the order in which each player won his first Twenty20 cap. Where more than one player won his first Twenty20 cap in the same match, those players are listed alphabetically by surname.

== Key ==
General

- ‡ – Captain
- † – Wicket-keeper
- First – Year of debut
- Last – Year of latest game
- Mat – Number of matches played

Batting

- Runs – Runs scored in career
- HS – Highest score
- Avg – Runs scored per dismissal
- * – Batsman remained not out
- 50 – Number of half centuries
- 100 – Centuries scored

Bowling

- Balls – Balls bowled in career
- Wkt – Wickets taken in career
- BBI – Best bowling in an innings
- Ave – Average runs per wicket

Fielding

- Ca – Catches taken
- St – Stumpings affected

== List of players ==
Statistics are correct as of 30 July 2026.

France T20I cricketers
General					Batting					Bowling				Fielding		Ref
No.	Name	First	Last	Mat	Runs	HS	Avg	50	100	Balls	Wkt	BBI	Ave	Ca	St	Ref
1	Dawood Ahmadzai‡	2021	2026	52	173	29	12.35	0	0	1115	62	6/21	19.67	22	0	
2	Hevit Jackson†	2021	2026	27	348	50	15.81	1	0	–	–	–	–	22	4	
3	Alestin Johnmary	2021	2025	5	33	14	6.60	0	0	–	–	–	–	1	0	
4	Jubaid Ahamed	2021	2022	9	49	13	9.80	0	0	–	–	–	–	4	0	
5	Mobashar Ashraf	2021	2021	2	2	2	2.00	0	0	24	1	1/17	24.00	0	0	
6	Noman Amjad‡	2021	2026	45	418	52	13.93	1	0	801	33	3/9	29.21	14	0	
7	Rahmatullah Mangal	2021	2026	30	102	18	6.80	0	0	576	37	4/12	16.83	14	0	
8	Suventhiran Santhirakumaran	2021	2023	6	75	34	12.50	0	0	–	–	–	–	3	0	
9	Usman Shahid‡	2021	2021	4	96	64	24.00	1	0	74	5	3/29	15.20	4	0	
10	Usman Khan	2021	2026	42	503	63*	20.12	3	0	697	55	4/17	14.92	17	0	
11	Virk Ali	2021	2026	15	275	53	19.64	2	0	–	–	–	–	10	2	
12	Mustafa Omer	2021	2026	13	310	108*	25.83	0	1	18	0	–	–	3	0	
13	Lingeswaran Canessane‡†	2021	2026	41	481	89*	15.03	2	0	–	–	–	–	17	2	
14	Ibrahim Jabarkhel	2021	2023	12	24	12*	12.00	0	0	108	5	2/12	24.00	8	0	
15	Abdul Rahman	2022	2022	1	1	1*	–	0	0	–	–	–	–	1	0	
16	Rohullah Mangal	2022	2025	18	6	2*	1.20	0	0	265	18	3/2	20.33	7	0	
17	Gustav McKeon	2022	2026	33	1002	109	34.55	6	2	171	9	3/27	22.11	15	0	
18	Zain Ahmad	2022	2025	20	198	52	11.00	1	0	240	17	4/20	15.58	8	0	
19	Abdulmalik Jabarkhel	2022	2022	2	–	–	–	–	–	–	–	–	–	0	0	
20	Mukhtar Ghulami	2023	2026	26	348	46	15.05	0	0	–	–	–	–	14	0	
21	Shayam Warnakulasuriya	2023	2023	8	24	10	8.00	0	0	132	10	5/12	17.70	4	0	
22	Pirakajan Pirabakaran	2023	2023	3	13	13	13.00	0	0	36	4	2/11	11.75	1	0	
23	Kamran Ahmadzai	2024	2026	20	344	56	26.46	1	0	179	7	4/12	32.71	8	0	
24	Hamza Niaz	2024	2024	10	168	53	16.80	0	0	–	–	–	–	2	0	
25	Christian Roberts	2024	2026	34	837	72	34.87	3	0	36	4	3/14	15.00	13	0	
26	Sajad Stanikzay	2024	2024	9	2	2	0.66	0	0	192	6	2/24	36.16	2	0	
27	Zaheer Zahiri	2024	2026	19	99	34*	19.80	0	0	401	25	3/22	19.40	3	0	
28	Ikbal Hossain	2024	2024	3	5	5*	–	0	0	60	3	3/16	17.66	2	0	
29	Jamshid Nasiri	2025	2026	5	167	65*	16.70	1	0	162	13	2/13	11.07	4	0	
30	Faisal Safi	2025	2026	5	59	43	11.80	0	0	–	–	–	–	1	0	
31	Lucas Smith	2025	2025	3	16	11	5.33	0	0	–	–	–	–	1	0	
32	Mohammad Khan Rafah	2026	2026	11	116	47	16.57	0	0	204	20	3/12	11.80	4	0	
33	Nasibullah Arab	2026	2026	10	222	33	22.20	0	0	–	–	–	–	3	0	
34	Rahimgul Naseri	2026	2026	12	92	54	11.50	1	0	192	7	3/15	35.42	4	0	
35	Zada Sher	2026	2026	12	201	55	18.27	1	0	138	5	1/12	36.60	2	0	
36	Abdurrahman Ahmadzai	2026	2026	3	14	14	14.00	0	0	48	2	2/9	18.50	1	0	
37	Zakria Atiq Butt	2026	2026	5	65	59	13.00	0	0	–	–	–	–	1	0	
38	Hussnain Afzal	2026	2026	1	–	–	–	–	–	–	–	–	–	0	0	
