= Tom Nightingale =

Guernsey cricketer (born 1998)

Personal information
- Born: 16 May 1998 (age 28)
- Batting: Right-handed
- Bowling: Right-arm off break

International information
- National side: Guernsey
- T20I debut (cap 21): 21 August 2020 v Isle of Man
- Last T20I: 23 May 2026 v Jersey

Career statistics
Competition	T20I
Matches	48
Runs scored	864
Batting average	21.07
100s/50s	0/4
Top score	75
Balls bowled	182
Wickets	5
Bowling average	45.80
5 wickets in innings	0
10 wickets in match	0
Best bowling	2/26
Catches/stumpings	27/–
- Source: Cricinfo, 26 May 2026

Tom Nightingale (born 16 May 1998) is a cricketer who plays for Guernsey. He played for Guernsey the 2017 ICC World Cricket League Division Five tournament in South Africa. He has also played for Leicestershire's second XI and club cricket for the Wangaratta & District Cricket Association in Australia. He made his Twenty20 International (T20I) debut for Guernsey against the Isle of Man on 21 August 2020.
