= Matthew Renouf =

Guernsey cricketer (born 1993)

Personal information
- Born: 15 April 1993 (age 33)

International information
- National side: Guernsey
- Source: ESPNcricinfo, 19 August 2020

Matthew Renouf (born 15 April 1993) is a cricketer who plays for Guernsey. He was named in Guernsey's squad for the 2012 ICC World Cricket League Division Five tournament in Singapore. He made his international debut for Guernsey, against Bahrain, and he played in the match against the Cayman Islands.

In August 2020, Renouf was named in Guernsey's Twenty20 International (T20I) squad for their one-off match against the Isle of Man.
