= Sharn Gomes =

South African cricketer (born 1988)

Personal information
- Full name: Sharn Patrick Gomes
- Born: 6 August 1988 (age 38); Cape Town, South Africa
- Batting: Left-handed
- Bowling: Slow left-arm orthodox

International information
- National side: Portugal
- T20I debut (cap 25): 29 June 2022 v Malta
- Last T20I: 1 June 2025 v Belgium

Domestic team information
- Years: Team
- 2010-2014: Western Province
- Source: Cricinfo, 18 June 2025

Sharn Patrick Gomes (born 6 August 1988) is a South African cricketer. He has played domestic cricket for Western Province and international cricket for Portugal. He is a left-handed batsman and slow left-arm orthodox bowler.

== Early life and domestic career ==
Gomes was born in Cape Town and attended Rondebosch Boys' High School. He played seventeen first-class, six List A, and four Twenty20 games for Western Province between 2010 and 2014. He also played in England for Northamptonshire's second XI.

== International career ==
Gomes represented Portugal in T10 cricket at the 2021 European Cricket Championship, scoring half-centuries against Hungary, Austria, Netherlands XI, and Romania.

He was named in Portugal's Twenty20 International (T20I) squad for the 2022 ICC Men's T20 World Cup Europe Qualifier C in Belgium. He made his T20I debut on 29 June 2022, for Portugal against Malta.
