= Gustav McKeon =

French cricketer

Personal information
- Born: 18 October 2003 (age 23)
- Batting: Right-handed
- Bowling: Right-arm medium-fast
- Role: Batting all-rounder
- Relatives: Ines McKeon (sister)

International information
- National side: France (2022–)
- T20I debut (cap 17): 24 July 2022 v Czech Republic
- Last T20I: 29 June 2025 v Hungary
- Source: ESPNcricinfo, 14 October 2025

Gustav McKeon (born 18 October 2003) is a French-Australian cricketer who plays internationally for the French national cricket team. In July 2022, he became the youngest cricketer to score a men's Twenty20 International (T20I) century and became the first cricketer to score back-to-back centuries in the format.

== International career ==
McKeon made his T20I debut on 24 July 2022, scoring 76 on debut against the Czech Republic. In his next game against Switzerland, McKeon scored 109, becoming the youngest male cricketer to score a T20I century. Then, in his next game against Norway, he scored 101, becoming the first cricketer to score back-to-back centuries in T20Is. He also broke the record for most runs scored in the first three innings of a men's T20I career with this century. He then went on to score 87 against Estonia, becoming just the 5th cricketer to score 4 back-to-back half-centuries.

McKeon's feats had him nominated for the ICC Men's Player of the Month for July 2022 award.

In July 2023, McKeon became the first player in the world to score 600+ runs in 10 consecutive T20I innings. In doing so, Mckeon surpassed the likes of Virat Kohli and Babar Azam, the previous holders of this record.

== Domestic career ==
Gustav competes for Perth Cricket Club in the Western Australian Premier Cricket competition.
