= Harvey Anderson =

English cricketer

Personal information
- Full name: Harvey Anderson
- Born: 10 October 1972 (age 54); Mirfield, England
- Batting: Right-handed
- Bowling: Right-arm off-break

Domestic team information
- Years: Team
- 2005: Galle Cricket Club

Career statistics
Competition	First-class
Matches	2
Runs scored	28
Batting average	19.33
100s/50s	0/0
Top score	16
Balls bowled	36
Wickets	0
Bowling average	–
5 wickets in innings	–
10 wickets in match	–
Best bowling	–
Catches/stumpings	0/–
- Source: CricketArchive, 12 August 2008

Harvey Anderson (born 10 October 1972) is an English first-class cricketer who played all his games for Galle Cricket Club. His highest score of 16 came when playing for Galle in the match against Colts Cricket Club. He has also played a few non First-class games for Bradford/Leeds University Centre of Cricketing Excellence in England.
