= Gentbrugge =

Sub-municipality of the city of Ghent, Belgium

- Sub-municipality of Ghent
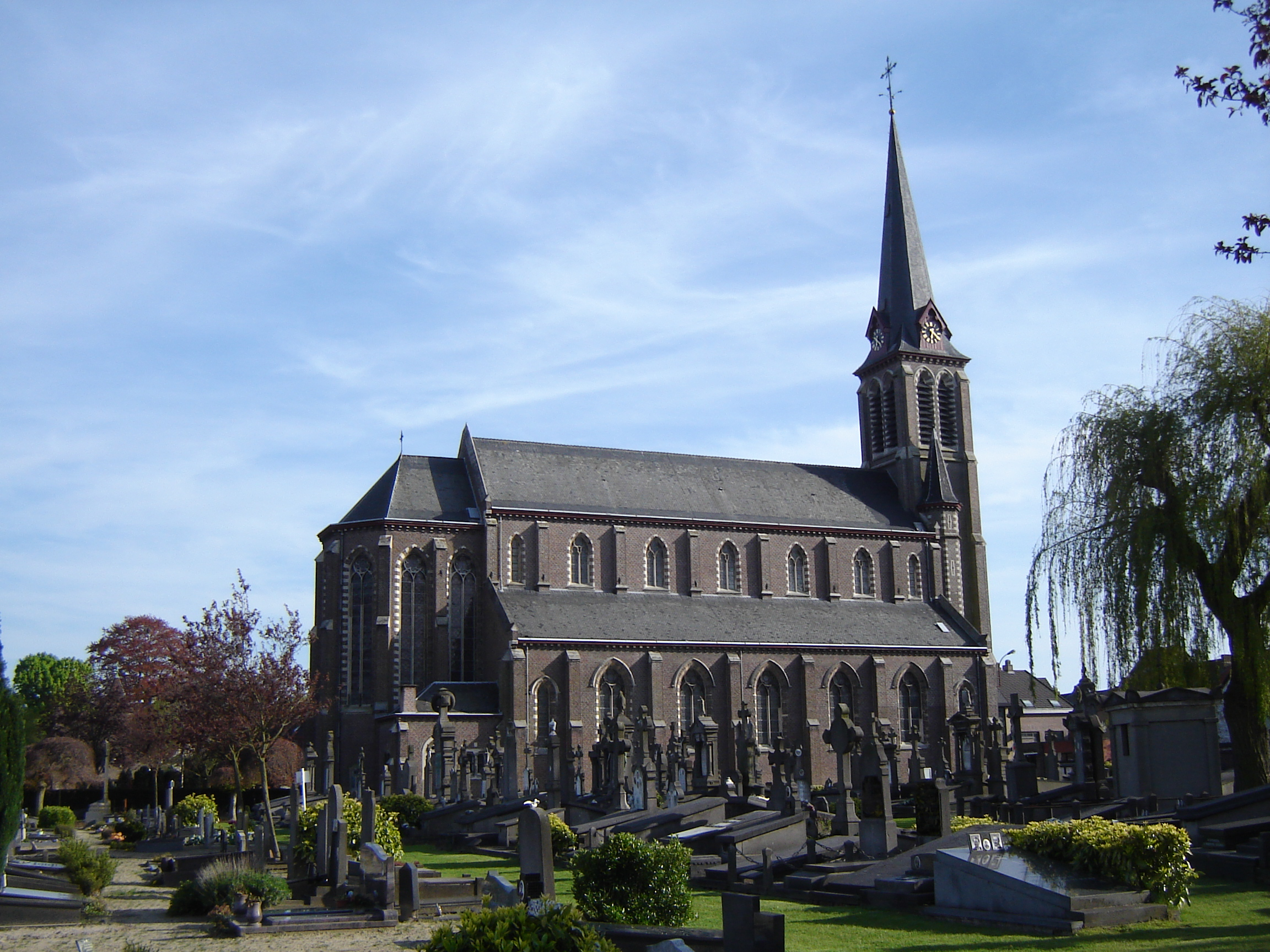
- Church of Saint Simon and Saint Jude

- Coat of arms

- Location of Gentbrugge in Ghent
- Interactive map of Gentbrugge
- Location within Belgium Location within East Flanders
- Coordinates: 51°1′53″N 3°45′51″E
- Country: Belgium
- Community: Flemish Community
- Region: Flemish Region
- Province: East Flanders
- Arrondissement: Ghent
- Municipality: Ghent

Area
  - Total: 7.86 km^{2} (3.03 sq mi)

Population (2020-01-01)
  - Total: 15,957
  - Density: 2,030/km^{2} (5,260/sq mi)
- Postal codes: 9050
- Area codes: 09

Gentbrugge (Dutch pronunciation: [ɣɛndˈbrʏɣə]; lit. 'Ghent Bridge') is a sub-municipality of the city of Ghent located in the province of East Flanders, Flemish Region, Belgium. It was a separate municipality until 1977. On 1 January 1977, it was merged into Ghent.

== Neighborhoods ==
The sub-municipality of Gentbrugge itself has been divided in four neighborhoods: Dries, Sportplein, Coninxdonk and the rural area Zwarte Fles with a population of 3417, 3653, 268 and 6 respectively in 2008.

== Demographic facts ==
- Between 1999 and 2008, the population grew by 2,1% as compared to 7,1 for Ghent entirely
- The average age is 9 to 42 years
- The number of non-Belgian inhabitants is with 3,7% lower than the average of Ghent (10,01%)

== Gentbrugse Meersen ==
The Gentbrugse Meersen is a rural area of 270ha surrounded by urbanized Gentbrugge to the West, the Scheldt river in the East, and parted in the middle by the E17 freeway. It is being developed by the City of Ghent to an area for nature development/conservation and recreation.

It is home to the Gentbrugse Meersen Cricket club. In June 2022, it was announced that the venue would host the first two Twenty20 International (T20I) matches in June 2022, between Belgium and Malta.

== Places of interest ==
- Rattendaelepark. A historical park, now for recreational use. From the Castle Vilain named after its first owner Albijn Vilain (1619). Only a tower remains.
- The water tower, visible when entering Ghent by the E17 highway from Antwerp. Originally from 1937 and colorfully repainted in 1990 by the Ghent artist Chris Demangel.
- Gentbrugge used to host the stadium of the Belgian first league football club, KAA Gent, also known as La Gantoise. Now the football club resides over at the Ghelamco Arena in the city of Ghent.
- The St. Eligius Church near the Brusselsesteenweg. Originally neo-gothic from 1884, but expanded in art-deco style in 1937 by the architect W. Vandenbogaerde.
- The castle Coninxdonck, built in the 19th century to replace a medieval castle.
- The Administrative Center. An example of sixties functionalism designed by the Belgian architect Paul Felix in 1973.
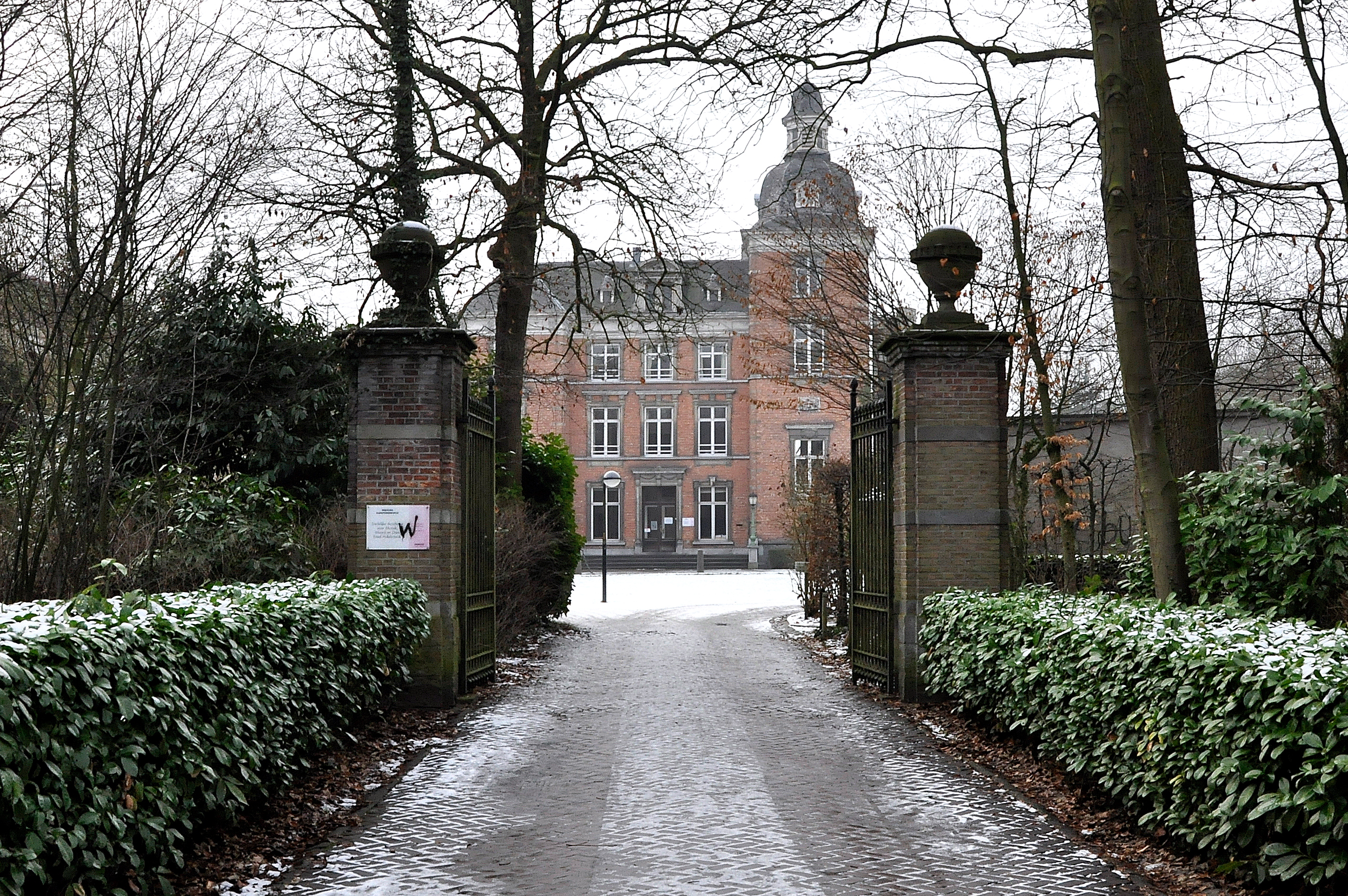
The Braem Castle

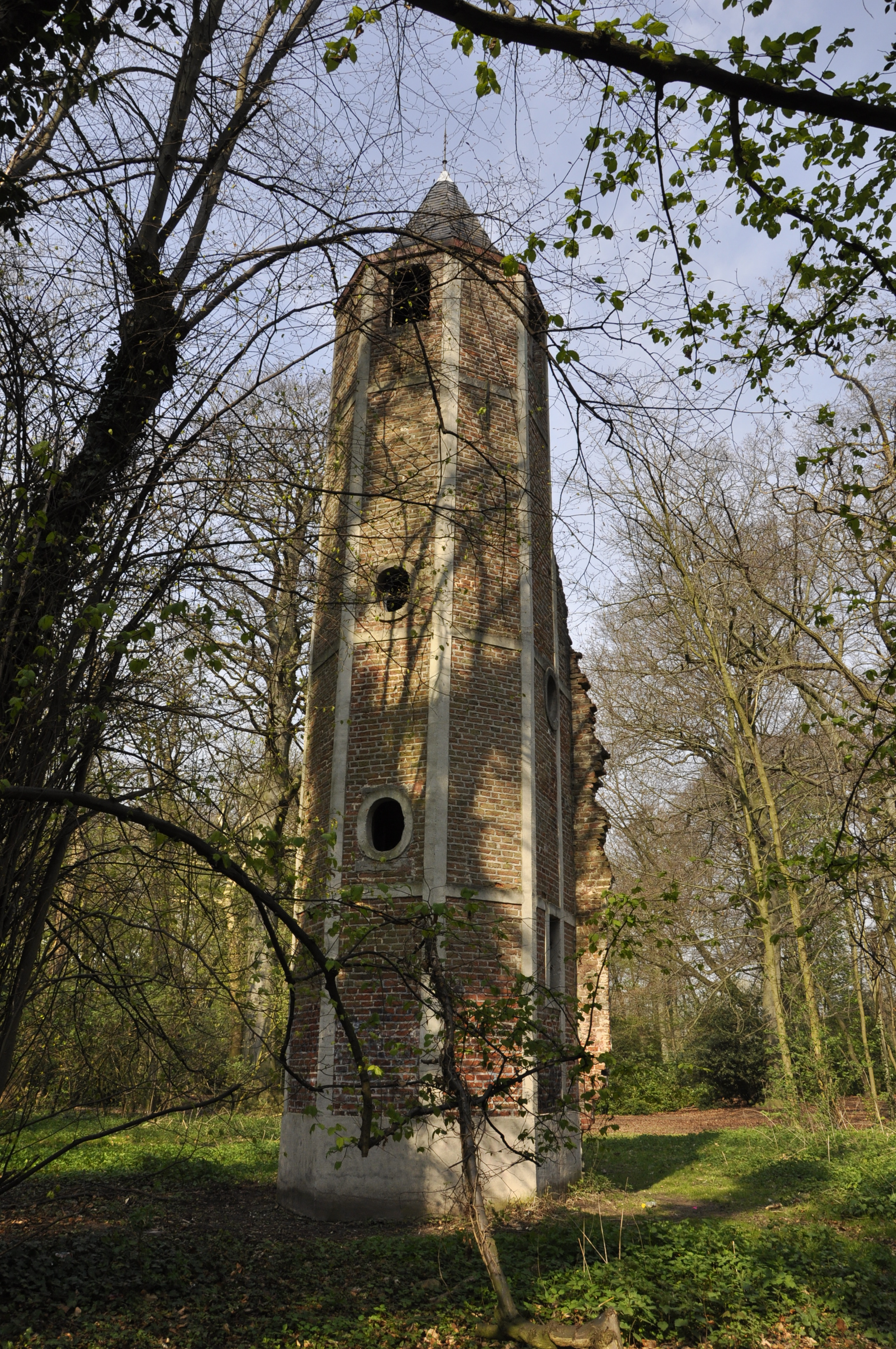
Tower Castle Vilain

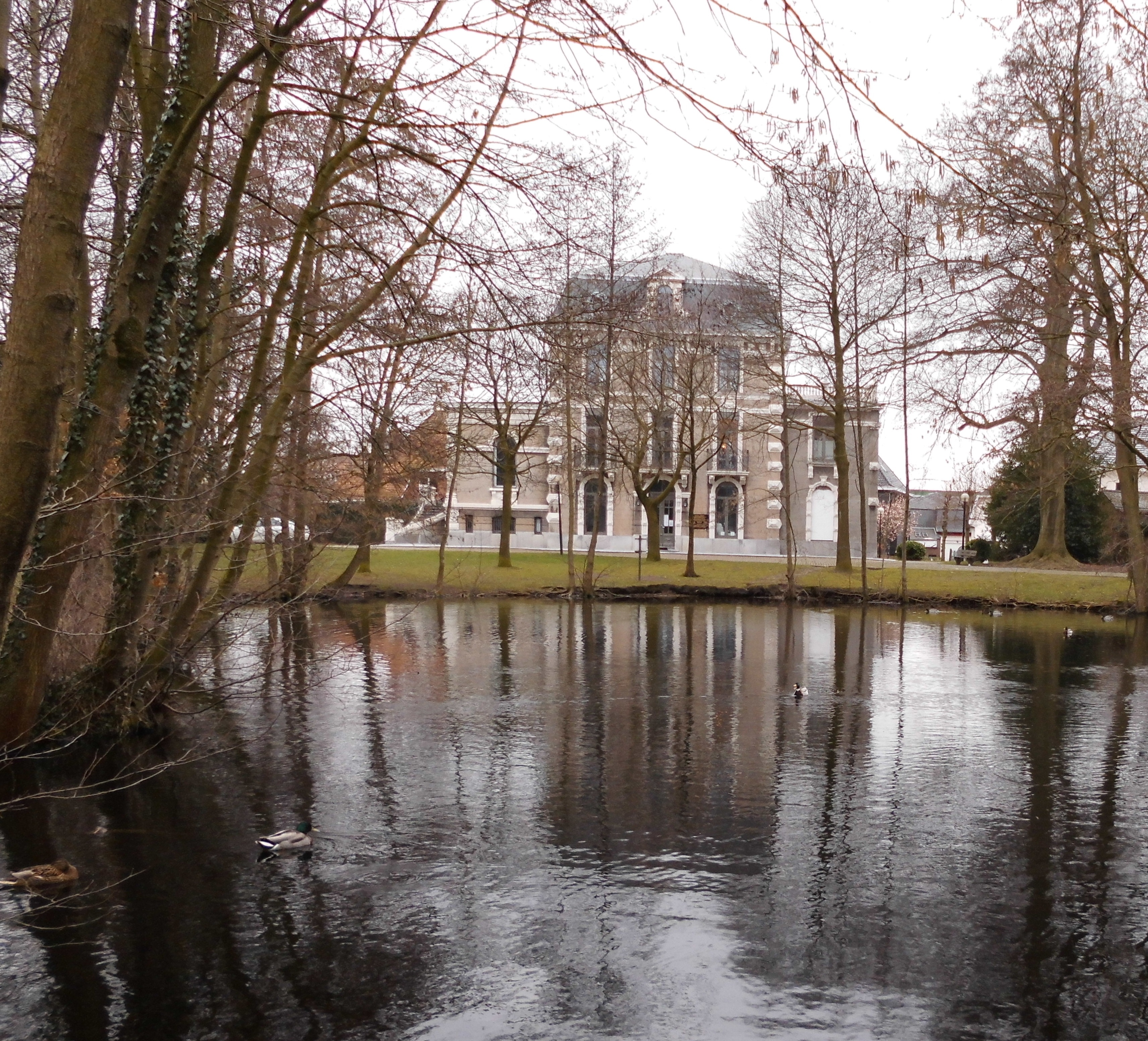
View of the Pélichy Castle

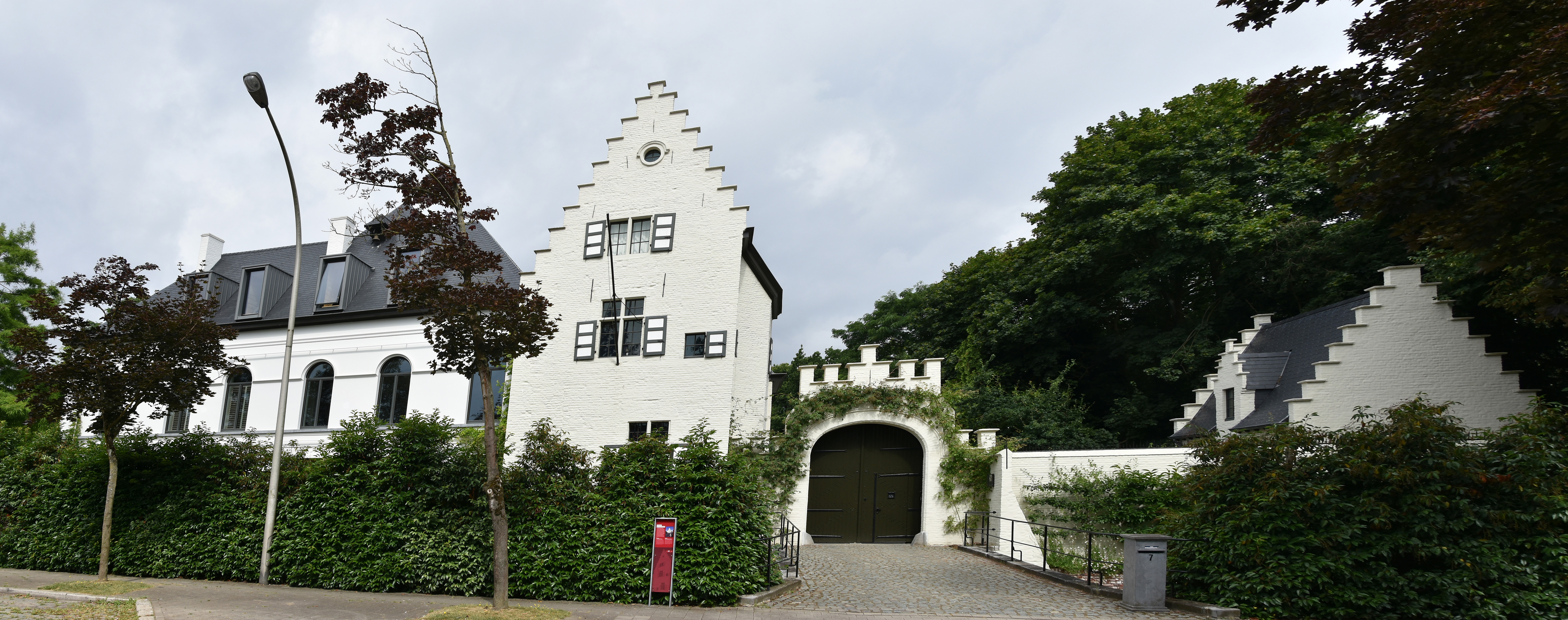
Old Hermitage Castle

== Sports ==
Gentbrugge used to have the stadium (Jules Ottenstadion) of the First Class-team KAA Gent, also known as La Gantoise. The final tribune of the stadium got demolished in June 2014. Since then, La Gantoise resides at the Ghelamco arena near the U.Z. clinic in Ghent. There are some tennis courts in Gentbrugge of a team which is also called La Gantoise, besides the hockey team.

There's also another football team in Ghent, which played its games in the Emanuel Hielstadium. This team was created on 1 April 1899 when the teams Athletic Club Gantois, Sport Pédestre Gantois, and Football Club Gantois merged and became a member of the UBSSA as Racing Club de Gand. In the period before 2010, this team has changed its name after some later developments into KRC-Gent-Zeehaven and it plays its matches in Oostakker. The fields in Gentbrugge have accommodated athletics from 2010 in order to give a suitable training field to the Racing Club Gent for Athletics.

== See also ==
- Zeeschelde
