= Taranjit Bharaj =

Danish cricketer (born 1993)

Personal information
- Full name: Taranjit Singh Bharaj
- Born: 3 March 1993 (age 33); New Delhi, India
- Nickname: Monty Singh
- Batting: Right-handed
- Bowling: Right-arm offbreak

International information
- National side: Denmark
- T20I debut (cap 5): 16 June 2019 v Jersey
- Last T20I: 28 August 2024 v Guernsey
- T20I shirt no.: 79
- Source: Cricinfo, 28 August 2024

Taranjit Bharaj (born 3 March 1993) is an Indian-born Danish cricketer, who plays for Denmark's national cricket team. He is a right-handed batsman and a right-arm offbreak bowler. In April 2018, he was named in Denmark's squad for the 2018 ICC World Cricket League Division Four tournament in Malaysia. He played in Denmark's second match of the tournament, against Jersey.

In September 2018, he was included in Denmark's squad for the 2018 ICC World Cricket League Division Three tournament in Oman.

In May 2019, he was named in Denmark's squad for a five-match series against Leinster Lightning in Ireland, in preparation for the Regional Finals of the 2018–19 ICC T20 World Cup Europe Qualifier tournament in Guernsey. The same month, he was named in Denmark's squad for the Regional Finals qualification tournament. Bharaj made his Twenty20 International (T20I) debut against Jersey, on 16 June 2019.

In August 2019, he was named in Denmark's squad for the 2019 Malaysia Cricket World Cup Challenge League A tournament.
