= Shaheed Dhanani =

Tanzanian cricketer (born 1987)

Personal information
- Born: 14 February 1987 (age 39); Pakistan

International information
- National side: Tanzania
- Source: ESPNcricinfo, 24 May 2016

Shaheed Dhanani (born 14 February 1987) is a Tanzanian cricketer. He played in the 2016 ICC World Cricket League Division Five tournament. During the tournament, he stood as captain in Tanzania's match against Oman.
