= Isle of Man cricket team in Guernsey in 2020 =

	Guernsey	Isle of Man
- Date: 21 August 2020 (Note: The series was actually played from 21–22 August; only the first game had official T20I status. Guernsey won the three-match series 3–0. The leading run-scorer for Guernsey was Isaac Damarell (127) and their leading wicket-taker was William Peatfield (6). The leading run-scorer for Isle of Man was Adam McAuley (107) and their leading wicket-taker was Chris Langford (4).)
Captains	Josh Butler	Matthew Ansell

Twenty20 International series
- Results: Guernsey won the 1-match series 1–0
Most runs	Isaac Damarell (52)	Adam McAuley (43)
Most wickets	Matthew Breban (3); William Peatfield (3)	Chris Langford (1); Jacob Butler (1)

The Isle of Man cricket team toured Guernsey from 18 to 22 August 2020 to play various age-group and senior matches, including a single Twenty20 International (T20I), against the hosts. The tour included various matches played between the under-13, under-15 and under-17 teams of each nation, including 20, 45 and 50-over formats.

The senior teams played a three-match T20 series, with the first of those matches being an official T20I played on 21 August at College Field in Saint Peter Port. This was the first official T20I match played by Isle of Man since the International Cricket Council's decision to grant T20I status to all matches played between Associate Members from 1 January 2019. Guernsey won the one-off T20I match by eight wickets. The two remaining matches of the series between the senior sides took place the following day at King George V Sports Ground, Castel, without official T20I status. Guernsey won the series 3–0.

== Squads ==
Guernsey	Isle of Man
Josh Butler (c); Luke Bichard; Matthew Breban; Nic Buckle; Isaac Damarell; Ben Ferbrache; Luke Le Tissier; Jason Martin (wk); Jordan Martel; Oliver Newey (wk); Tom Nightingale; William Peatfield; Matthew Renouf; Anthony Stokes; Thomas Veillard	Matthew Ansell (c); George Burrows; Joseph Burrows; Jacob Butler; Fraser Clarke; Carl Hartmann (wk); Nathan Knights; Chris Langford; Corbin Liebenberg; Adam McAuley; Sam Mills; Edward Walker; Oliver Webster

== T20 series ==
The teams played a three-match series; only the first match had T20I status.

=== 1st T20 (Only T20I) ===
21 August 2020
16:00
Scorecard

Isle of Man; 100/9 (20 overs)	v	Guernsey; 101/2 (11.3 overs)
Adam McAuley 43 (53); Matthew Breban 3/24 (4 overs); William Peatfield 3/24 (4 overs)		Isaac Damarell 52 (31); Chris Langford 1/17 (2 overs)

Guernsey won by 8 wickets
College Field, Saint Peter Port
Umpires: Carl Brooks (Gue) and Mark Savage (Gue)
Player of the match: Isaac Damarell (Gue)

- Isle of Man won the toss and elected to bat.
- Luke Bichard, Matthew Breban, Isaac Damarell, Jason Martin, Tom Nightingale (Gue), Matthew Ansell, George Burrows, Joseph Burrows, Jacob Butler, Carl Hartmann, Nathan Knights, Chris Langford, Corbin Liebenberg, Adam McAuley, Sam Mills and Oliver Webster (IoM) all made their T20I debuts.

=== 2nd T20 ===
22 August 2020
11:00
Scorecard

Guernsey; 146/5 (20 overs)	v	Isle of Man; 138/5 (20 overs)
Ben Ferbrache 55* (38); Chris Langford 2/18 (4 overs)		Adam McAuley 44 (39); Luke Bichard 2/29 (4 overs)

Guernsey won by 8 runs
King George V Sports Ground, Castel
Umpires: Mike Savage (Gue) and Martin Tolcher (Gue)
Player of the match: Ben Ferbrache (Gue)

- Guernsey won the toss and elected to bat.

=== 3rd T20 ===
22 August 2020
15:00
Scorecard

Isle of Man; 91/8 (20 overs)	v	Guernsey; 95/1 (11.4 overs)
Matthew Ansell 30 (24); William Peatfield 3/11 (4 overs)		Isaac Damarell 48* (26); Chris Langford 1/27 (4 overs)

Guernsey won by 9 wickets
King George V Sports Ground, Castel
Umpires: Mike Kinder (Gue) and Martin Tolcher (Gue)
Player of the match: Isaac Damarell (Gue)

- Isle of Man won the toss and elected to bat.
