= Isaac Damarell =

Guernsey cricketer (born 1994)

Personal information
- Full name: Isaac DA Damarell
- Born: 21 February 1994 (age 32)
- Batting: Left-handed
- Role: Wicket-keeper, Batsman

International information
- National side: Guernsey
- T20I debut (cap 19): 21 August 2020 v Isle of Man
- Last T20I: 23 May 2026 v Jersey

Career statistics
Competition	T20I
Matches	44
Runs scored	655
Batting average	20.46
100s/50s	0/2
Top score	52
Catches/stumpings	33/12
- Source: Cricinfo, 26 May 2026

Isaac Damarell (born 21 February 1994) is a cricketer who plays for Guernsey. He played in the 2014 ICC World Cricket League Division Five tournament. In May 2015, he participated in the 2015 ICC Europe Division One tournament. He made his Twenty20 International (T20I) debut for Guernsey against the Isle of Man on 21 August 2020.
