= Isle of Man cricket team =

International cricket team

Isle of Man
- Isle of Man Cricket Logo
- Association: Isle of Man Cricket Association

Personnel
- Captain: Dollin Jansen
- Coach: Greig Wright

International Cricket Council
- ICC status: Associate member (2017)
- ICC region: Europe
ICC Rankings	Current	Best-ever
T20I	64th	38th (27 July 2022)

International cricket
- First international: 14 August 2005 v Greece at Mechelen Cricket Club, Belgium

T20 Internationals
- First T20I: v Guernsey at College Field, Saint Peter Port; 21 August 2020
- Last T20I: v Israel at Tikkurila Cricket Ground, Vantaa; 21 August 2026
T20Is	Played	Won/Lost
Total	33	15/15 (0 ties, 3 no results)
This year	7	3/3 (0 ties, 1 no result)
T20I home kit
T20I away kit
- As of 21 August 2026

The Isle of Man men's cricket team is the team that represents the Crown dependency of the Isle of Man in international cricket. They became an affiliate member of the International Cricket Council (ICC) in 2004 and an associate member in 2017. In October 2020, the Isle of Man Cricket Association planned to establish its first ever women's team.

== History ==
=== Early ICC Era ===
The Manx cricket team, based in the Isle of Man, joined the ICC in 2004, playing their first ICC affiliated competitions in 2005. Previously the national sides had played fixtures against the MCC, on tour in the UK and against touring sides to the Isle of Man.

The first international engagement for the Isle of Man came in 2005 at the European Affiliates Championship. The side was captained by Rob Webber, with the management team of Dougie Hind and Colin Jones. They finished in eighth place in this tournament, which originally meant a demotion to Division Four in the newly expanded five division European Championship.

However, when the divisions were announced, the Isle of Man had a place in Division Three for 2007. As they had a year without competitive international cricket in 2006, the Isle of Man arranged two one-day friendly matches against Spain played at La Manga Club Ground at the end of September/beginning of October, both of which they won.

In 2007 under Webber, Jones and coach Harvey Anderson, they finished third in the European Division Three, defeating Belgium, Malta (twice) and Cyprus. They were beaten by Spain in the semi-final by fewer wickets lost, after a tie on runs scored. In the 3rd/4th play-off they recorded a 7 wicket win over Malta. Details on European Division Three 2007 in Belgium can be found in the European Cricket Tournaments archive –

=== Gareth Dawson Era ===
In 2008, The Isle of Man cricket association appointed Gareth Dawson, brother of former test spinner Richard, as head coach of the Isle of Man cricket team. Dawson would be responsible for all age groups ranging from the junior set ups all the way to the full Senior squad. A goal was set of achieving Associate status within the European Cricket Council and reaching the world cricket leagues.

The team finished second, losing out to Israel at the 2009 European Championships Division Three. They went on to win the 2012 ICC European Division Two (T20) tournament in Corfu, earning promotion to Division One in 2013. In 2013, Dawson coached the senior team to a fourth tournament, the European Division One championships in Sussex, England.

=== 2018–Present ===
In April 2018, the ICC decided to grant full Twenty20 International (T20I) status to all its members. Therefore, all Twenty20 matches played between the Isle of Man and other ICC members after 1 January 2019 are full T20I.

Isle of Man played their first official T20I on 21 August 2020 against Guernsey.

21 August 2020
16:00
Scorecard

Isle of Man; 100/9 (20 overs)	v	Guernsey; 101/2 (11.3 overs)
Adam McAuley 43 (53); Matthew Breban 3/24 (4 overs); William Peatfield 3/24 (4 overs)		Isaac Damarell 52 (31); Chris Langford 1/17 (2 overs)

Guernsey won by 8 wickets
College Field, Saint Peter Port
Umpires: Carl Brooks (Gue) and Mark Savage (Gue)
Player of the match: Isaac Damarell (Gue)

- Isle of Man won the toss and elected to bat.
- First ever T20I match for Isle of Man.

=== Greig Wright Era ===
The Isle of Man National team competed in ICC Europe Division 2. After only playing three games, with one win and two losses, the team did not progress to the next round.

On day 1, after a close loss to Belgium in the final over of game 1 and a rain-affected win against Finland, Isle of Man were not badly placed. But defeats in the next three matches resulted in a last-place finish at the 2018 T20 World Cup Europe Qualifier.

The Isle of Man under the guidance of team manager Sally Green and head couch Greig Wright headed to Finland to compete in the T20 World Cup qualifiers. They won all their four group games, advancing to the final, but lost to Italy, and so they did not advance to the regional final.

In 2023 the team achieved a record low score in a Twenty20 International game against Spain: they were dismissed for only 10 runs. This surpassed the previous record low-score in Twenty20 matches of 15 all out made by Sydney Thunder in 2022.

=== 2026 Qualifiers ===
At the T20 World Cup Europe Sub-regional Qualifier C in August 2026, Isle of Man finished third in their group after recording wins over Bulgaria and Luxembourg, losing to Spain and having their match against hosts Finland abandoned without a ball being bowled due to rain. They subsequently defeated Israel in a play-off to secure fifth place overall in the tournament.l.

== International Grounds ==
The two Isle of Man cricket grounds which have hosted an international cricket match

== Tournament history ==
T20 World Cup Europe Sub-regional Qualifiers	European Cricket Championship	Four Islands tournament
(Netherlands) 2018: 6th place; (Finland) 2022: Runners-up; (Italy) 2024: 6th place	(Belgium) 2007 (Division three): 3rd place — remained; (Spain) 2009 (Division three): Runners-up — promoted; (Belgium) (Netherlands) 2011 (Division two): Runners-up — remained; (Greece) 2012 (Division two): Winners — promoted; (England) 2013 (Division one): 9th place — relegated; (England) 2014 (Division two): 5th place — remained; (Sweden) 2011 (Division two): 5th place	2000: Runners-up; 2002: 3rd place; 2004: Runners-up

== Records and statistics ==
International Match Summary — Isle of Man

Last updated 21 August 2026

Playing Record
Format	M	W	L	T	NR	Inaugural Match
Twenty20 Internationals	33	15	15	0	3	21 August 2020

=== Twenty20 International ===
T20I record versus other nations

Records complete to T20I #4095. Last updated 21 August 2026.

Opponent	M	W	L	T	NR	First match	First win
vs Associate Members
Austria	3	2	0	0	1	9 July 2023	9 July 2023
Bulgaria	1	1	0	0	0	17 August 2026	17 August 2026
Cyprus	3	3	0	0	0	6 October 2021	6 October 2021
Estonia	2	2	0	0	0	6 October 2021	6 October 2021
France	1	0	1	0	0	9 June 2024	
Guernsey	4	0	3	0	1	21 August 2020	
Israel	1	1	0	0	0	21 August 2026	21 August 2026
Italy	2	0	2	0	0	19 July 2022	
Luxembourg	2	2	0	0	0	15 June 2024	15 June 2024
Portugal	1	0	1	0	0	16 June 2024	
Romania	1	1	0	0	0	15 July 2022	15 July 2022
Serbia	1	1	0	0	0	13 July 2022	13 July 2022
Spain	7	0	6	0	1	24 February 2023	
Sweden	2	0	2	0	0	6 September 2025	
Turkey	2	2	0	0	0	18 July 2022	18 July 2022

=== Other results ===
For a list of selected international matches played by Isle of Man, see Cricket Archive.

== Current squad ==
Updated as of 6 September 2025.

This lists all the players who were part of the Isle of Man squad for the home series against Sweden. Uncapped players are listed in italics.

Name	Age	Batting style	Bowling style	Domestic club	Last T20I	Notes
Batters
Josh Clough	22	Right-handed	—N/a	Cronkbourne CC	(Sweden) 2025	
Luke Ward	21	Right-handed	—N/a	Ramsey CC	(Sweden) 2025	
Joel Williams	18	Right-handed	Leg break googly	Cronkbourne CC	—N/a	
Dollin Jansen	20	Left-handed	Left-arm medium	Cronkbourne CC	(Sweden) 2025	Captain
Christian Webster	20	Right-handed	Right-arm off break	Finch Hill CC	(Sweden) 2025	
All-rounder
Chris Langford	39	Left-handed	Left-arm fast-medium	Crosby CC	(Sweden) 2025	
Corbin Leibenberg	24	Right-handed	Right-arm medium	Cronkbourne CC	(Sweden) 2025	
Wicket-keeper
Carl Hartmann	22	Right-handed	—N/a	Crosby CC	(Sweden) 2025	
Pace Bowlers
Jerad Griffin	21	Right-handed	Right-arm medium	—N/a	(Sweden) 2025	
Spencer Clarke	23	Right-handed	Right-arm medium	Finch Hill CC	(Italy) 2024	
Spin Bowlers
Joseph Burrows	30	Left-handed	Slow left-arm orthodox	Crosby CC	(Sweden) 2025	
Fraser Clarke	21	Right-handed	Right-arm off break	Finch Hill CC	(Sweden) 2025	
Matthew Ansell	32	Right-handed	Slow left-arm orthodox	Cronkbourne CC	(Sweden) 2025	

== See also ==
- Isle of Man Cricket Association
- List of Isle of Man Twenty20 International cricketers
