= Isle of Man Cricket Association =

The Isle of Man Cricket Association is the official ICC recognised organisation chosen to represent the Isle of Man in cricket matters. In 2017, it became an associate member
