= 2025 Cricket World Cup Challenge League A (Jersey) =

Cricket tournament

2025 Jersey Cricket World Cup Challenge League A
- Dates: 21 – 31 August 2025
- Administrator: International Cricket Council
- Cricket format: List A
- Tournament format: Round-robin
- Host: Jersey
- Participants: 6
- Matches: 15
- Player of the series: (Jersey) Josh Lawrenson
- Most runs: (Kuwait) Meet Bhavsar (256)
- Most wickets: (Jersey) Josh Lawrenson (13)

The 2025 Jersey Cricket World Cup Challenge League A was the second round of Group A matches of the 2024–2026 Cricket World Cup Challenge League, a cricket tournament which forms part of the qualification pathway to the 2027 Cricket World Cup. It was confirmed that Jersey Cricket Board would host the tournament. The series took place in August 2025, with all the matches having List A status.

At the end of the event, Jersey had earned a three-point lead at the top of league A.

== Squads ==
Denmark	Jersey	Kenya	Kuwait	Papua New Guinea	Qatar
Hamid Shah (c); Saif Ahmad; Lucky Ali; Surya Anand; Mustakim Aslam; Taranjit Bharaj (vc, wk); Sebastian Heath (wk); Eshan Karimi; Delawar Khan; Abdullah Mahmood; Saud Munir; Musa Shaheen; Shangeev Thanikaithasan; Shakeel Zeb	Charles Perchard (c); Daniel Birrell; Dom Blampied; Charlie Brennan; Harrison Carlyon; Jake Dunford (wk); Edward Giles; Patrick Gouge (wk); Nick Greenwood; Jonty Jenner; Josh Lawrenson; William Perchard; Theo Pullman; George Richardson; Julius Sumerauer; Asa Tribe; Zak Tribe	Dhiren Gondaria (c); Sachin Bhudia; Jasraj Kundi; Peter Langat; Francis Mutua; Shem Ngoche; Nelson Odhiambo; Lucas Oluoch; Rakep Patel; Vishil Patel; Vraj Patel; Pushkar Sharma; Tanzeel Sheikh; Sukhdeep Singh (wk)	Mohammed Aslam (c); Muhammad Amin; Clinto Anto; Muhammad Aqif; Meet Bhavsar; Anudeep Chenthamara; Shiraz Khan; Nimish Lathif; Usman Patel (wk); Yasin Patel; Ravija Sandaruwan; Mohamed Shafeeq; Muhammad Umar; Ali Zaheer	Assad Vala (c); Sese Bau (vc); Michael Charlie; Kiplin Doriga (wk); Vagi Guba; John Kariko; Peter Karoho; Jason Kila; Kabua Morea; Alei Nao; Patrick Nou; Damien Ravu; Boio Ray; Hila Vare (wk)	Ikramullah Khan (c); Owais Ahmed; Muhammad Asim; Amir Farooq; Mohammed Irshad; Muhammad Jabir; Shahzaib Jamil (wk); Shakkir Kassim; Imal Liyanage; Daniel Louis; Mujeeb-ur-Rehman; Muhammad Murad; Arif Nasir Uddin; Muhammad Tanveer

== Preparations ==
Before the tournament, Denmark played two one-day matches against Scotland A in Stirling. The Qatari national team played games in England against Marylebone Cricket Club, Fledglings, Lordswood Cricket Club and the London Schools' Cricket Association. Papua New Guinea played a Twenty20 International (T20I) and two one-day matches in Guernsey.

=== Denmark in Scotland ===
12 August 2025
10:00
Scorecard

Denmark; 138 (37.4 overs)	v	Scotland A 142/4 (26 overs)
Taranjit Bharaj 40 (57); Jake Woodhouse 3/17 (5 overs)		Finlay McCreath 44* (54); Shakeel Zeb 1/9 (2 overs)

Scotland A won by 6 wickets
New Williamfield, Stirling

- Denmark won the toss and elected to bat.

13 August 2025
10:00
Scorecard

Scotland A 65 (21.4 overs)	v	Denmark; 66/2 (10.3 overs)
Lloyd Brown 21 (40); Shakeel Zeb 4/16 (6 overs)		Musa Shaheen 25 (28); Ollie Jones 1/8 (1 over)

Denmark won by 8 wickets
New Williamfield, Stirling

- Scotland A won the toss and elected to bat.

=== Guernsey v Papua New Guinea series ===
Papua New Guinea men's cricket team in Guernsey in 2025
	Guernsey	Papua New Guinea
- Date: 14 August 2025
Captains	Oliver Nightingale	Assad Vala

Twenty20 International series
- Results: Papua New Guinea won the 1-match series 1–0
Most runs	Tom Nightingale (75)	Sese Bau (85)
Most wickets	Charlie Forshaw (3)	Alei Nao (2)

==== Only T20I ====
14 August 2025
17:00
Scorecard

Guernsey; 165/6 (20 overs)	v	Papua New Guinea; 168/4 (19.2 overs)
Tom Nightingale 75 (51); Alei Nao 2/21 (4 overs)		Sese Bau 85 (52); Charlie Forshaw 3/29 (4 overs)

Papua New Guinea won by 6 wickets
King George V Sports Ground, Castel
Umpires: Carl Brooks (Gue) and Mike Kinder (Gue)
Player of the match: Sese Bau (PNG)

- Papua New Guinea won the toss and elected to field.
- Oliver Clapham (Gue), Peter Karoho and Boio Ray (PNG) all made their T20I debuts.

==== 50-over series ====
===== 1st 50-over match =====
16 August 2025
11:00
Scorecard

Papua New Guinea; 90 (23.3 overs)	v	Guernsey; 91/1 (23.1 overs)
Kiplin Doriga 33* (34); Charlie Forshaw 7/16 (8.3 overs)		Josh Butler 42* (65)

Guernsey won by 9 wickets
King George V Sports Ground, Castel
Umpires: Owen Brock (Gue) and Heath Kearns (Jer)
Player of the match: Charlie Forshaw (Gue)

- Papua New Guinea won the toss and elected to bat.

===== 2nd 50-over match =====
17 August 2025
11:00
Scorecard

Guernsey; 274 (48.3 overs)	v	Papua New Guinea; 161 (40 overs)
Alex Bushell 91 (69); Alei Nao 5/50 (9.3 overs)		Sese Bau 89 (87); Adam Martel 4/23 (7 overs)

Guernsey won by 113 runs
King George V Sports Ground, Castel
Umpires: Heath Kearns (Jer) and Mike Kinder (Gue)

- Guernsey won the toss and elected to bat.

== Fixtures ==
21 August 2025
11:00
Scorecard

Kuwait; 299/7 (50 overs)	v	Qatar; 277/9 (50 overs)
Meet Bhavsar 129 (140); Muhammad Murad 2/59 (9 overs)		Muhammad Asim 94 (70); Mohamed Shafeeq 3/47 (10 overs)

Kuwait won by 22 runs
Grainville Cricket Ground, St Saviour
Umpires: David McLean (Sco) and Gazi Sohel (Ban)
Player of the match: Meet Bhavsar (Kuw)

- Kuwait won the toss and elected to bat.
- Anudeep Chenthamara (Kuw), Muhammad Asim, Shahzaib Jamil and Daniel Louis (Qat) all made their List A debuts.

21 August 2025
11:00
Scorecard

Kenya; 115 (36.1 overs)	v	Jersey; 116/3 (23.5 overs)
Rakep Patel 34 (57); Josh Lawrenson 4/25 (8 overs)		Jonty Jenner 56* (51); Nelson Odhiambo 3/18 (7 overs)

Jersey won by 7 wickets
Farmers Cricket Club Ground, St Martin
Umpires: Nitin Bathi (Ned) and Russell Warren (Eng)
Player of the match: Josh Lawrenson (Jer)

- Jersey won the toss and elected to field.
- George Richardson (Jer) made his List A debut.

22 August 2025
11:00
Scorecard

Denmark; 223/8 (50 overs)	v	Papua New Guinea; 205 (48.2 overs)
Lucky Ali 83 (112); Alei Nao 3/36 (10 overs)		Kiplin Doriga 68 (84); Surya Anand 3/36 (9 overs)

Denmark won by 18 runs
Grainville Cricket Ground, St Saviour
Umpires: Mark Jameson (Ger) and Maulik Prabhudesai (Ned)
Player of the match: Lucky Ali (Den)

- Denmark won the toss and elected to bat.
- Sebastian Heath, Shakeel Zeb (Den), Patrick Nou and Boio Ray (PNG) all made their List A debuts.

23 August 2025
11:00
Scorecard

Kuwait; 223/9 (50 overs)	v	Jersey; 223/9 (50 overs)
Meet Bhavsar 53 (78); Josh Lawrenson 3/27 (10 overs)		Harrison Carlyon 77 (94); Mohamed Shafeeq 3/29 (8 overs)

Match tied
Farmers Cricket Club Ground, St Martin
Umpires: David McLean (Sco) and Russell Warren (Eng)
Player of the match: Josh Lawrenson (Jer)

- Jersey won the toss and elected to field.

24 August 2025
11:00
Scorecard

Kenya; 242/8 (50 overs)	v	Qatar; 243/2 (43.3 overs)
Francis Mutua 61* (52); Owais Ahmed 3/48 (10 overs)		Imal Liyanage 107* (136); Nelson Odhiambo 1/25 (5 overs)

Qatar won by 8 wickets
Grainville Cricket Ground, St Saviour
Umpires: Maulik Prabhudesai (Ned) and Gazi Sohel (Ban)
Player of the match: Imal Liyanage (Qat)

- Kenya won the toss and elected to bat.
- Jasraj Kundi, Francis Mutua (Ken) and Mohammed Irshad (Qat) all made their List A debuts.
- Imal Liyanage (Qat) scored his first century in List A cricket.

24 August 2025
11:00
Scorecard

Papua New Guinea; 148 (35.2 overs)	v	Kuwait; 149/6 (22.4 overs)
Sese Bau 63 (68); Shiraz Khan 3/23 (8 overs)		Mohammed Aslam 55* (50); Damien Ravu 2/21 (4 overs)

Kuwait won by 4 wickets
Farmers Cricket Club Ground, St Martin
Umpires: Nitin Bathi (Ned) and Mark Jameson (Ger)
Player of the match: Mohammed Aslam (Kuw)

- Kuwait won the toss and elected to field.

25 August 2025
11:00
Scorecard

Jersey; 348/3 (50 overs)	v	Denmark; 259 (45 overs)
Josh Lawrenson 139 (152); Shakeel Zeb 2/64 (7 overs)		Lucky Ali 52 (60); Dom Blampied 3/48 (7 overs)

Jersey won by 89 runs
Grainville Cricket Ground, St Saviour
Umpires: David McLean (Sco) and Russell Warren (Eng)
Player of the match: Josh Lawrenson (Jer)

- Jersey won the toss and elected to bat.

27 August 2025
11:00
Scorecard

Qatar; 265/7 (50 overs)	v	Denmark; 37/3 (16 overs)
Muhammad Tanveer 91 (112); Saif Ahmad 3/50 (10 overs)		Hamid Shah 22* (41); Ikramullah Khan 1/4 (5 overs)

No result
Farmers Cricket Club Ground, St Martin
Umpires: Mark Jameson (Ger) and Maulik Prabhudesai (Ned)

- Denmark won the toss and elected to field.
- No further play was possible due to rain.
- Arif Nasir Uddin (Qat) made his List A debut.

27 August 2025
11:00
Scorecard

Kenya; 275/8 (50 overs)	v	Papua New Guinea; 53/2 (14.3 overs)
Pushkar Sharma 78 (102); Kabua Morea 2/45 (10 overs)		Hila Vare 28* (48); Jasraj Kundi 1/6 (2 overs)

No result
Grainville Cricket Ground, St Saviour
Umpires: Nitin Bathi (Ned) and Gazi Sohel (Ban)

- Papua New Guinea won the toss and elected to field.
- No further play was possible due to rain.
- Vishil Patel (Ken) and Vagi Guba (PNG) both made their List A debuts.

28 August 2025
11:00
Scorecard

Denmark; 162 (35.2 overs)	v	Kuwait; 166/3 (39.3 overs)
Delawar Khan 36* (20); Nimish Lathif 5/39 (9 overs)		Meet Bhavsar 68* (116); Delawar Khan 2/46 (10 overs)

Kuwait won by 7 wickets
Grainville Cricket Ground, St Saviour
Umpires: Gazi Sohel (Ban) and Russell Warren (Eng)
Player of the match: Nimish Lathif (Kuw)

- Denmark won the toss and elected to bat.

28 August 2025
11:00
Scorecard

Jersey; 261 (49.1 overs)	v	Papua New Guinea; 101 (30.2 overs)
Asa Tribe 175 (156); Kabua Morea 3/51 (9.1 overs)		Vagi Guba 41 (79); Nick Greenwood 2/3 (2.2 overs)

Jersey won by 160 runs
Farmers Cricket Club Ground, St Martin
Umpires: Mark Jameson (Ger) and David McLean (Sco)
Player of the match: Asa Tribe (Jer)

- Papua New Guinea won the toss and elected to field.
- Asa Tribe (Jer) made the highest individual score in the Challenge League (175).
- This was Asa Tribe's third consecutive List A century in a week, after previously scoring two for Glamorgan.

30 August 2025
11:00
Scorecard

Kuwait; 85/4 (19 overs)	v	Kenya
Ravija Sandaruwan 23 (30); Lucas Oluoch 2/29 (6 overs)

No result
Grainville Cricket Ground, St Saviour
Umpires: Nitin Bathi (Ned) and Gazi Sohel (Ban)

- Kenya won the toss and elected to field.
- No further play was possible due to rain.

30 August 2025
11:00
Scorecard

Papua New Guinea; 145 (38 overs)	v	Qatar; 21/2 (5 overs)
Damien Ravu 38 (48); Ikramullah Khan 3/33 (7 overs)		Muhammad Tanveer 13* (7); Alei Nao 1/1 (2 overs)

No result
Farmers Cricket Club Ground, St Martin
Umpires: Maulik Prabhudesai (Ned) and Russell Warren (Eng)

- Qatar won the toss and elected to field.
- No further play was possible due to rain.
- Peter Karoho (PNG) made his List A debut.

31 August 2025
11:00
Scorecard

Qatar; 132 (47.2 overs)	v	Jersey; 136/2 (18.4 overs)
Mujeeb-ur-Rehman 40 (99); Josh Lawrenson 4/25 (10 overs)		Harrison Carlyon 55 (55); Mujeeb-ur-Rehman 1/32 (6 overs)

Jersey won by 8 wickets
Grainville Cricket Ground, St Saviour
Umpires: Nitin Bathi (Ned) and Mark Jameson (Ger)
Player of the match: Josh Lawrenson (Jer)

- Qatar won the toss and elected to bat.

31 August 2025
11:00
Scorecard

Denmark; 308/9 (50 overs)	v	Kenya; 120 (33.5 overs)
Saif Ahmad 123 (119); Nelson Odhiambo 3/43 (8 overs)		Dhiren Gondaria 42 (45); Abdullah Mahmood 4/3 (3 overs)

Denmark won by 188 runs
Farmers Cricket Club Ground, St Martin
Umpires: David McLean (Sco) and Maulik Prabhudesai (Ned)
Player of the match: Saif Ahmad (Den)

- Kenya won the toss and elected to field.
