= 2022 Cricket World Cup Challenge League B (Jersey) =

Cricket tournament

2022 Jersey Cricket World Cup Challenge League B
- Dates: 4 – 14 August 2022
- Administrator: International Cricket Council
- Cricket format: List A
- Tournament format: Round-robin
- Host: Jersey Cricket Board
- Participants: 6
- Matches: 15
- Player of the series: (Jersey) Asa Tribe
- Most runs: (Jersey) Nick Greenwood (326)
- Most wickets: (Bermuda) Kamau Leverock (12)

The 2022 Jersey Cricket World Cup Challenge League B was the third and final round of matches in Group B of the 2019–2022 Cricket World Cup Challenge League, a cricket tournament which forms part of the qualification pathway to the 2023 Cricket World Cup. Originally, the tournament was scheduled to take place in Jersey in September 2021, but it was rescheduled to take place in Hong Kong due to the COVID-19 pandemic. After a further postponement, in February 2022, the tournament was rescheduled to be played in Jersey in August 2022. This was the first senior international tournament hosted in Jersey since the 2016 ICC World Cricket League Division Five.

With three games remaining, Hong Kong were one point ahead of Jersey and Uganda at the top of the group table. On 10 August 2022, Jersey defeated Hong Kong by 7 wickets to replace them at the top of the table with two rounds of games remaining. On the same day, a loss to Kenya left the Ugandans in third place, two points behind Jersey and one point behind Hong Kong. A comfortable win for Jersey in the penultimate round of matches left them with a two-point advantage over Uganda and a superior net run rate going into the final day. Jersey were confirmed as winners of Challenge League B despite losing their final game against Kenya.

On 14 August 2022, Jersey won Challenge League B ahead of Uganda on net run rate. Jersey progressed to the 2023 ICC Cricket World Cup Qualifier Play-off where they, in line with ICC's previous announcements, played their first official One Day International matches.

== Squads ==
The following squads were named for the tournament.

| Bermuda | Hong Kong | Italy | Jersey | Kenya | Uganda |
|---|---|---|---|---|---|
| Kamau Leverock (c); Joseph Basden; Ras Solomon Burrows; Steven Bremar; Zeko Burgess; Jabari Darrell; ~~Delray Rawlins~~; Terryn Fray; Khiry Furbert; Dennico Hollis; Cameron Jeffers; Stefan Kelly; Dominic Sabir; Jamar Stovel; Zeri Tomlinson; Charles Trott | Nizakat Khan (c); Kinchit Shah (vc); Zeeshan Ali; Haroon Arshad; Mohammad Ghazanfar; Babar Hayat; Aftab Hussain; Aizaz Khan; Ehsan Khan; Scott McKechnie (wk); Hassan Khan Mohammad; Yasim Murtaza; Wajid Shah; Ayush Shukla; Shahid Wasif | Gareth Berg (c); Gian-Piero Meade (vc); Madupa Fernando; Ali Hasan; Kevin Kekulawala; Harry Manenti; Anthony Mosca; Justin Mosca; Ahmed Nisar; Nimna Pauththuwadura; Ishan Ranepura; Nisal Ranhaluge; Dinuka Samarawickrama; Jagmeet Singh; Jaspreet Singh | Charles Perchard (c); Daniel Birrell; Dominic Blampied; Harrison Carlyon; Jake Dunford (wk); Nick Greenwood; Anthony Hawkins-Kay; Jonty Jenner; Josh Lawrenson; Elliot Miles; Rhys Palmer; Ben Stevens; Julius Sumerauer; Asa Tribe; Benjamin Ward | Shem Ngoche (c); Emmanuel Bundi; Aman Gandhi; Irfan Karim; Alex Obanda; Collins Obuya; Eugene Ochieng; Nelson Odhiambo; Elijah Otieno; Rakep Patel; Rushab Patel; Vraj Patel; Tanzeel Sheikh; Sukhdeep Singh; Yash Talati | Deusdedit Muhumuza (c); Kenneth Waiswa (vc); Fred Achelam (wk); Frank Akankwasa; Bilal Hassan; Cosmas Kyewuta; Juma Miyagi; Dinesh Nakrani; Frank Nsubuga; Arnold Otwani; Ronak Patel; Riazat Ali Shah; Henry Ssenyondo; Simon Ssesazi |

On 18 July 2022, Zeko Burgess replaced Delray Rawlins in Bermuda's squad.

== Fixtures ==
4 August 2022
11:00
Scorecard

| Italy; 304 (48.1 overs) | v | Bermuda; 116 (34.5 overs) |
| Anthony Mosca 104 (117); Cameron Jeffers 3/55 (10 overs) | | Zeko Burgess 29* (37); Gareth Berg 2/11 (8 overs) |

Italy won by 188 runs
Grainville Cricket Ground, St Saviour
Umpires: Rahul Asher (Oma) and Shiju Sam (UAE)
Player of the match: Anthony Mosca (Ita)

- Italy won the toss and elected to bat.
- Ras Solomon Burrows, Khiry Furbert, Zeri Tomlinson (Ber), Ali Hasan, Harry Manenti, Anthony Mosca, Justin Mosca, Ahmed Nisar, Nimna Pauththuwadura and Dinuka Samarawickrama (Ita) all made their List A debuts.

5 August 2022
11:00
Scorecard

| Hong Kong; 213/9 (50 overs) | v | Kenya; 162 (43.4 overs) |
| Babar Hayat 38 (46); Emmanuel Bundi 2/34 (8 overs) | | Rakep Patel 54 (60); Kinchit Shah 4/24 (6.4 overs) |

Hong Kong won by 51 runs
Grainville Cricket Ground, St Saviour
Umpires: Rahul Asher (Oma) and Anna Harris (Eng)
Player of the match: Ehsan Khan (HK)

- Kenya won the toss and elected to field.
- Aman Gandhi, Sukhdeep Singh and Yash Talati (Ken) all made their List A debuts.

5 August 2022
11:00
Scorecard

| Uganda; 266/6 (50 overs) | v | Jersey; 271/5 (47.4 overs) |
| Deusdedit Muhumuza 86* (80); Elliot Miles 2/60 (10 overs) | | Harrison Carlyon 96 (115); Riazat Ali Shah 2/34 (6 overs) |

Jersey won by 5 wickets
Farmers Cricket Club Ground, St Martin
Umpires: Shiju Sam (UAE) and Steve Wood (Ire)
Player of the match: Harrison Carlyon (Jer)

- Uganda won the toss and elected to bat.
- Asa Tribe (Jer) made his List A debut.

7 August 2022
11:00
Scorecard

| Italy; 119 (38.2 overs) | v | Uganda; 122/3 (19.5 overs) |
| Harry Manenti 36 (61); Frank Nsubuga 3/8 (9 overs) | | Ronak Patel 67* (62); Ali Hasan 1/12 (4 overs) |

Uganda won by 7 wickets
Grainville Cricket Ground, St Saviour
Umpires: Anna Harris (Eng) and Shiju Sam (UAE)
Player of the match: Frank Nsubuga (Uga)

- Italy won the toss and elected to bat.
- Nisal Ranhaluge (Ita) made his List A debut.

7 August 2022
11:00
Scorecard

| Hong Kong; 311/7 (50 overs) | v | Bermuda; 192 (48.4 overs) |
| Kinchit Shah 139 (128); Kamau Leverock 3/66 (10 overs) | | Terryn Fray 45 (86); Mohammad Ghazanfar 4/30 (10 overs) |

Hong Kong won by 119 runs
Farmers Cricket Club Ground, St Martin
Umpires: Rahul Asher (Oma) and Jasmine Naeem (Eng)
Player of the match: Kinchit Shah (HK)

- Hong Kong won the toss and elected to bat.
- Joseph Basden (Ber) made his List A debut.

8 August 2022
11:00
Scorecard

| Jersey; 381/5 (50 overs) | v | Bermuda; 175/9 (50 overs) |
| Asa Tribe 101 (87); Kamau Leverock 2/81 (10 overs) | | Charles Trott 45 (47); Harrison Carlyon 2/13 (6 overs) |

Jersey won by 206 runs
Grainville Cricket Ground, St Saviour
Umpires: Anna Harris (Eng) and Steve Wood (Ire)
Player of the match: Asa Tribe (Jer)

- Bermuda won the toss and elected to field.

8 August 2022
11:00
Scorecard

| Kenya; 295/7 (50 overs) | v | Italy; 271 (48.2 overs) |
| Rakep Patel 113 (108); Harry Manenti 3/79 (10 overs) | | Dinuka Samarawickrama 62 (95); Vraj Patel 3/40 (9 overs) |

Kenya won by 24 runs
Farmers Cricket Club Ground, St Martin
Umpires: Jasmine Naeem (Eng) and Shiju Sam (UAE)
Player of the match: Rakep Patel (Ken)

- Italy won the toss and elected to field.
- Jagmeet Singh (Ita) made his List A debut.

10 August 2022
11:00
Scorecard

| Kenya; 172/9 (50 overs) | v | Uganda; 136 (45.1 overs) |
| Irfan Karim 63 (127); Riazat Ali Shah 4/38 (10 overs) | | Riazat Ali Shah 49 (98); Emmanuel Bundi 6/36 (8.1 overs) |

Kenya won by 36 runs
Grainville Cricket Ground, St Saviour
Umpires: Anna Harris (Eng) and Steve Wood (Ire)
Player of the match: Emmanuel Bundi (Ken)

- Uganda won the toss and elected to field.

10 August 2022
11:00
Scorecard

| Hong Kong; 284/4 (50 overs) | v | Jersey; 285/3 (48.1 overs) |
| Nizakat Khan 127* (147); Julius Sumerauer 1/47 (10 overs) | | Nick Greenwood 94 (104); Ayush Shukla 1/43 (7 overs) |

Jersey won by 7 wickets
Farmers Cricket Club Ground, St Martin
Umpires: Jasmine Naeem (Eng) and Shiju Sam (UAE)
Player of the match: Nick Greenwood (Jer)

- Hong Kong won the toss and elected to bat.

11 August 2022
11:00
Scorecard

| Italy; 254 (49.3 overs) | v | Hong Kong; 250 (49.1 overs) |
| Harry Manenti 106 (112); Haroon Arshad 7/31 (8.3 overs) | | Aizaz Khan 88 (92); Harry Manenti 3/33 (9.1 overs) |

Italy won by 4 runs
Grainville Cricket Ground, St Saviour
Umpires: Rahul Asher (Oma) and Steve Wood (Ire)
Player of the match: Harry Manenti (Ita)

- Hong Kong won the toss and elected to field.
- Kevin Kekulawala (Ita) made his List A debut.

11 August 2022
11:00
Scorecard

| Bermuda; 234/7 (50 overs) | v | Kenya; 238/3 (42.1 overs) |
| Charles Trott 58 (46); Tanzeel Sheikh 2/13 (1.2 overs) | | Irfan Karim 80* (122); Kamau Leverock 3/45 (10 overs) |

Kenya won by 7 wickets
Farmers Cricket Club Ground, St Martin
Umpires: Jasmine Naeem (Eng) and Shiju Sam (UAE)
Player of the match: Irfan Karim (Ken)

- Bermuda won the toss and elected to bat.

13 August 2022
11:00
Scorecard

| Uganda; 314/4 (50 overs) | v | Bermuda; 161 (40.5 overs) |
| Ronak Patel 121* (122); Kamau Leverock 2/70 (10 overs) | | Kamau Leverock 58 (44); Frank Akankwasa 5/19 (4.5 overs) |

Uganda won by 153 runs
Grainville Cricket Ground, St Saviour
Umpires: Anna Harris (Eng) and Steve Wood (Ire)
Player of the match: Ronak Patel (Uga)

- Uganda won the toss and elected to bat.

13 August 2022
11:00
Scorecard

| Jersey; 349/4 (50 overs) | v | Italy; 204 (39.1 overs) |
| Nick Greenwood 141 (126); Gareth Berg 2/65 (10 overs) | | Anthony Mosca 105 (95); Charles Perchard 3/23 (6 overs) |

Jersey won by 145 runs
Farmers Cricket Club Ground, St Martin
Umpires: Rahul Asher (Oma) and Jasmine Naeem (Eng)
Player of the match: Nick Greenwood (Jer)

- Italy won the toss and elected to field.
- Ishan Ranepura (Ita) made his List A debut.

14 August 2022
11:00
Scorecard

| Jersey; 172 (48.1 overs) | v | Kenya; 173/6 (42.4 overs) |
| Josh Lawrenson 52 (93); Vraj Patel 3/34 (10 overs) | | Irfan Karim 53* (124); Elliot Miles 3/33 (10 overs) |

Kenya won by 4 wickets
Grainville Cricket Ground, St Saviour
Umpires: Rahul Asher (Oma) and Anna Harris (Eng)
Player of the match: Irfan Karim (Ken)

- Jersey won the toss and elected to bat.

14 August 2022
11:00
Scorecard

| Uganda; 397/3 (50 overs) | v | Hong Kong; 179 (38.1 overs) |
| Simon Ssesazi 137 (134); Kinchit Shah 2/97 (10 overs) | | Kinchit Shah 53 (51); Frank Nsubuga 3/27 (8 overs) |

Uganda won by 218 runs
Farmers Cricket Club Ground, St Martin
Umpires: Jasmine Naeem (Eng) and Steve Wood (Ire)
Player of the match: Simon Ssesazi (Uga)

- Uganda won the toss and elected to bat.
