= 2022 Cricket World Cup Challenge League B (Uganda) =

Cricket tournament

2022 Uganda Cricket World Cup Challenge League B
- Dates: 17 – 27 June 2022
- Administrator: International Cricket Council
- Cricket format: List A
- Tournament format: Round-robin
- Host: Uganda Cricket Association
- Participants: 6
- Matches: 15
- Most runs: (Jersey) Nick Greenwood (327)
- Most wickets: (Italy) Gareth Berg (16)

The 2022 Uganda Cricket World Cup Challenge League B was the second round of matches in Group B of the 2019–2022 Cricket World Cup Challenge League, a cricket tournament which formed part of the qualification pathway to the 2023 Cricket World Cup. All of the matches had List A status. The tournament took place in June 2022 in Uganda.

In October 2019, the International Cricket Council (ICC) confirmed that the Uganda Cricket Association (UGA) would host the tournament, with the series scheduled to take place between 3 and 13 August 2020. However, on 10 June 2020, the ICC confirmed that the tournament had been postponed due to the COVID-19 pandemic. In February 2022, the tournament was rescheduled for June 2022, with the fixtures announced in May 2022.

Jersey won all five of their matches in Uganda, to close the gap on Uganda and Hong Kong at the top of the group table. Conversely, Bermuda lost all five of their matches, resulting in them being eliminated from reaching the World Cup Qualifier Play-off.

== Squads ==
The following squads were named for the tournament.

| Bermuda | Hong Kong | Italy | Jersey | Kenya | Uganda |
|---|---|---|---|---|---|
| Kamau Leverock (c); Steven Bremar; Zeko Burgess; Jabari Darrell; Amari Ebbin; Cameron Jeffers; Dennico Hollis; Malachi Jones; Najiyah Raynor; Dalin Richardson; Jelani Richardson; Dominic Sabir; Jamar Stovel; Charles Trott | Nizakat Khan (c); Zeeshan Ali; Haroon Arshad; Jamie Atkinson (wk); Mohammad Ghazanfar; Adit Gorawara; Babar Hayat; Aizaz Khan; Ehsan Khan; Yasim Murtaza; Dan Pascoe; Kinchit Shah; Vikas Sharma; Ayush Shukla; Shahid Wasif | Gareth Berg (c); Hasnat Ahmed; Marcus Campopiano; Madupa Fernando; Jamie Grassi; Crishan Kalugamage; Damith Kosala; Nicholas Maiolo; Gian-Piero Meade; Joy Perera; Amir Sharif; Jaspreet Singh; Manpreet Singh; Sukhwinder Singh; Nikolai Smith | Charles Perchard (c); Daniel Birrell; Dominic Blampied; Harrison Carlyon; Jake Dunford (wk); Nick Greenwood; Anthony Hawkins-Kay; Jonty Jenner; Josh Lawrenson; Elliot Miles; Ben Stevens; Julius Sumerauer; Zak Tribe; Benjamin Ward | Shem Ngoche (c); Sachin Bhudia; Emmanuel Bundi; Irfan Karim (wk); Alex Obanda; Collins Obuya; Eugene Ochieng; Nehemiah Odhiambo; Nelson Odhiambo; Elijah Otieno; Rakep Patel; Rushab Patel; Vraj Patel; Tanzeel Sheikh | Brian Masaba (c); Fred Achelam (wk); Frank Akankwasa; Emmanuel Hasahya; Cosmas Kyewuta; Juma Miyagi; Deusdedit Muhumuza; Dinesh Nakrani; Frank Nsubuga; Arnold Otwani; Ronak Patel; Riazat Ali Shah; Henry Ssenyondo; Simon Ssesazi; Kenneth Waiswa |

== Fixtures ==
17 June 2022
10:00
Scorecard

| Jersey; 255/6 (50 overs) | v | Uganda; 193 (45.2 overs) |
| Nick Greenwood 80 (93); Juma Miyagi 1/22 (8 overs) | | Ronak Patel 64 (95); Dominic Blampied 5/18 (5.2 overs) |

Jersey won by 62 runs
Lugogo Stadium, Kampala
Umpires: Andrew Louw (Nam) and David Odhiambo (Ken)
Player of the match: Dominic Blampied (Jer)

- Uganda won the toss and elected to field.
- Emmanuel Hasahya, Cosmas Kyewuta, Juma Miyagi, Simon Ssesazi (Uga) and Anthony Hawkins-Kay (Jer) all made their List A debuts.
- Dominic Blampied (Jer) took his first five-wicket haul in List A cricket.

18 June 2022
10:00
Scorecard

| Hong Kong; 283 (49.5 overs) | v | Italy; 225 (44.1 overs) |
| Kinchit Shah 102 (97); Gareth Berg 5/51 (10 overs) | | Jaspreet Singh 81 (60); Aizaz Khan 3/33 (6.1 overs) |

Hong Kong won by 58 runs
Lugogo Stadium, Kampala
Umpires: Rockie D'Mello (Ken) and Patric Makumbi (Uga)
Player of the match: Kinchit Shah (HK)

- Hong Kong won the toss and elected to bat.
- Ayush Shukla (HK), Hasnat Ahmed, Marcus Campopiano and Crishan Kalugamage (Ita) all made their List A debuts.

18 June 2022
10:00
Scorecard

| Bermuda; 107 (27 overs) | v | Kenya; 109/4 (19 overs) |
| Kamau Leverock 29 (35); Elijah Otieno 5/21 (7 overs) | | Rushab Patel 49* (51); Malachi Jones 1/10 (4 overs) |

Kenya won by 6 wickets
Kyambogo Cricket Oval, Kampala
Umpires: Shaun George (SA) and Claus Schumacher (Nam)
Player of the match: Elijah Otieno (Ken)

- Bermuda won the toss and elected to bat.
- Steven Bremar, Jabari Darrell, Amari Ebbin, Najiyah Raynor, Dalin Richardson, Dominic Sabir, Charles Trott (Ber) and Vraj Patel (Ken) all made their List A debuts.
- Elijah Otieno (Ken) took his first five-wicket haul in List A cricket.

20 June 2022
10:00
Scorecard

| Jersey; 275 (50 overs) | v | Kenya; 179 (41 overs) |
| Nick Greenwood 66 (48); Shem Ngoche 3/59 (10 overs) | | Rakep Patel 86 (89); Anthony Hawkins-Kay 5/18 (7 overs) |

Jersey won by 96 runs
Lugogo Stadium, Kampala
Umpires: Shaun George (SA) and Patric Makumbi (Uga)
Player of the match: Anthony Hawkins-Kay (Jer)

- Jersey won the toss and elected to bat.
- Anthony Hawkins-Kay (Jer) took his first five-wicket haul in List A cricket.

20 June 2022
10:00
Scorecard

| Uganda; 94 (33.2 overs) | v | Hong Kong; 96/4 (21.5 overs) |
| Ronak Patel 35 (60); Ehsan Khan 4/17 (6.2 overs) | | Nizakat Khan 24 (25); Henry Ssenyondo 2/15 (8 overs) |

Hong Kong won by 6 wickets
Kyambogo Cricket Oval, Kampala
Umpires: David Odhiambo (Ken) and Claus Schumacher (Nam)
Player of the match: Yasim Murtaza (HK)

- Uganda won the toss and elected to bat.

21 June 2022
10:00
Scorecard

| Bermuda; 95 (28.5 overs) | v | Uganda; 99/2 (17.5 overs) |
| Dalin Richardson 15 (19); Frank Akankwasa 2/0 (0.5 overs) | | Simon Ssesazi 50* (53); Jabari Darrell 1/16 (4 overs) |

Uganda won by 8 wickets
Lugogo Stadium, Kampala
Umpires: Shaun George (SA) and Andrew Louw (Nam)
Player of the match: Simon Ssesazi (Uga)

- Bermuda won the toss and elected to bat.
- Frank Akankwasa (Uga) and Cameron Jeffers (Ber) both made their List A debuts.

21 June 2022
10:00
Scorecard

| Jersey; 223/9 (50 overs) | v | Italy; 135 (36.3 overs) |
| Josh Lawrenson 102* (129); Gareth Berg 4/25 (10 overs) | | Gian-Piero Meade 42 (52); Julius Sumerauer 6/32 (7.3 overs) |

Jersey won by 88 runs
Kyambogo Cricket Oval, Kampala
Umpires: Rockie D'Mello (Ken) and David Odhiambo (Ken)
Player of the match: Julius Sumerauer (Jer)

- Jersey won the toss and elected to bat.
- Sukhwinder Singh (Ita) made his List A debut.
- Josh Lawrenson (Jer) scored his first century in List A cricket.
- Julius Sumerauer (Jer) took his first five-wicket haul in List A cricket.

23 June 2022
10:00
Scorecard

| Kenya; 340/9 (50 overs) | v | Italy; 206 (38.1 overs) |
| Alex Obanda 115 (83); Gareth Berg 3/33 (10 overs) | | Marcus Campopiano 85 (99); Emmanuel Bundi 2/27 (6 overs) |

Kenya won by 134 runs
Lugogo Stadium, Kampala
Umpires: Patric Makumbi (Uga) and Claus Schumacher (Nam)
Player of the match: Alex Obanda (Ken)

- Kenya won the toss and elected to bat.
- Amir Sharif (Ita), Eugene Ochieng and Tanzeel Sheikh (Ken) all made their List A debuts.

23 June 2022
10:00
Scorecard

| Hong Kong; 313/9 (50 overs) | v | Bermuda; 119 (25.1 overs) |
| Babar Hayat 135 (102); Kamau Leverock 4/62 (9 overs) | | Dominic Sabir 34 (27); Ehsan Khan 4/20 (4.1 overs) |

Hong Kong won by 194 runs
Kyambogo Cricket Oval, Kampala
Umpires: Rockie D'Mello (Ken) and Andrew Louw (Nam)
Player of the match: Babar Hayat (HK)

- Bermuda won the toss and elected to field.
- Jelani Richardson and Jamar Stovel (Ber) both made their List A debuts.

24 June 2022
10:00
Scorecard

| Jersey; 289/8 (50 overs) | v | Hong Kong; 234 (47 overs) |
| Jonty Jenner 70 (48); Ayush Shukla 2/47 (7 overs) | | Aizaz Khan 39 (37); Julius Sumerauer 3/36 (8.2 overs) |

Jersey won by 55 runs
Lugogo Stadium, Kampala
Umpires: Rockie D'Mello (Ken) and Shaun George (SA)
Player of the match: Jonty Jenner (Jer)

- Jersey won the toss and elected to bat.

24 June 2022
10:00
Scorecard

| Italy; 120 (36.3 overs) | v | Uganda; 121/3 (24.2 overs) |
| Crishan Kalugamage 31 (56); Dinesh Nakrani 2/25 (8 overs) | | Kenneth Waiswa 35* (55); Gareth Berg 2/6 (5 overs) |

Uganda won by 7 wickets
Kyambogo Cricket Oval, Kampala
Umpires: Andrew Louw (Nam) and David Odhiambo (Ken)
Player of the match: Dinesh Nakrani (Uga)

- Italy won the toss and elected to bat.
- Damith Kosala (Ita) made his List A debut.

26 June 2022
10:00
Scorecard

| Kenya; 220 (47.1 overs) | v | Uganda; 224/3 (45.1 overs) |
| Rakep Patel 72 (72); Cosmas Kyewuta 3/22 (8.1 overs) | | Simon Ssesazi 87* (112); Eugene Ochieng 3/37 (7.5 overs) |

Uganda won by 7 wickets
Lugogo Stadium, Kampala
Umpires: Shaun George (SA) and Claus Schumacher (Nam)
Player of the match: Simon Ssesazi (Uga)

- Kenya won the toss and elected to bat.

26 June 2022
10:00
Scorecard

| Jersey; 371/8 (50 overs) | v | Bermuda; 80 (17.5 overs) |
| Nick Greenwood 106 (80); Jelani Richardson 2/36 (5 overs) | | Kamau Leverock 63 (51); Harrison Carlyon 5/13 (5 overs) |

Jersey won by 291 runs
Kyambogo Cricket Oval, Kampala
Umpires: Patric Makumbi (Uga) and David Odhiambo (Ken)
Player of the match: Harrison Carlyon (Jer)

- Jersey won the toss and elected to bat.

27 June 2022
10:00
Scorecard

| Bermuda; 120 (27.4 overs) | v | Italy; 124/0 (12.2 overs) |
| Malachi Jones 21 (18); Crishan Kalugamage 3/24 (7 overs) | | Marcus Campopiano 75* (37) |

Italy won by 10 wickets
Lugogo Stadium, Kampala
Umpires: Rockie D'Mello (Ken) and Patric Makumbi (Uga)
Player of the match: Marcus Campopiano (Ita)

- Bermuda won the toss and elected to bat.

27 June 2022
10:00
Scorecard

| Kenya; 135 (38.3 overs) | v | Hong Kong; 137/5 (34 overs) |
| Irfan Karim 59* (94); Yasim Murtaza 4/26 (8.3 overs) | | Aizaz Khan 59* (76); Shem Ngoche 3/29 (10 overs) |

Hong Kong won by 5 wickets
Kyambogo Cricket Oval, Kampala
Umpires: Andrew Louw (Nam) and Claus Schumacher (Nam)
Player of the match: Yasim Murtaza (HK)

- Kenya won the toss and elected to bat.
