= Asa Tribe =

Jersey cricketer (born 2004)

Personal information
- Full name: Asa Mark Tribe
- Born: 29 March 2004 (age 22); Jersey
- Batting: Right-handed
- Bowling: Right-arm off break
- Role: Batsman

International information
- National side: Jersey (2021–2026)
- ODI debut (cap 10): 27 March 2023 v Canada
- Last ODI: 5 April 2023 v UAE
- T20I debut (cap 16): 15 October 2021 v Germany
- Last T20I: 5 July 2025 v Netherlands

Domestic team information
- Years: Team
- 2024–present: Glamorgan (squad no. 55)
- 2026: Paarl Royals
- 2026: Welsh Fire

Career statistics
Competition	ODI	T20I	FC	LA
Matches	5	26	32	34
Runs scored	237	564	2,148	1,554
Batting average	59.25	25.63	41.30	57.55
100s/50s	1/1	0/4	6/9	5/8
Top score	115*	73*	206	175
Balls bowled	24	36	134	390
Wickets	0	0	0	7
Bowling average	–	–	–	51.42
5 wickets in innings	–	–	–	0
10 wickets in match	–	–	–	0
Best bowling	–	–	–	2/51
Catches/stumpings	2/–	10/2	41/–	19/–
- Source: Cricinfo, 2 November 2026

Asa Mark Tribe (born 29 March 2004) is a professional cricketer who plays for Jersey, England Lions and Glamorgan County Cricket Club. He has also represented Cardiff Metropolitan University.

== Career ==
Tribe spent his early career at Farmers Cricket Club and played for Jersey's age groups from 10 to 18.

He broke into the Jersey senior squad in 2021, making his debut against Germany in an ICC Men's T20 World Cup Europe Region Qualifier in Spain on 15 October.

Tribe made his List A debut, for his country against Uganda on 5 August 2022, in the Cricket World Cup Challenge League B tournament held in Jersey. Such was his impact at the tournament, which included making a century against Bermuda, he was named Player of the Series and subsequently won Jersey's 2022 Cricketer of the Year award.

Named as a member of Jersey's squad for the 2023 Cricket World Cup Qualifier Play-off in Namibia, he made his One Day International (ODI) debut on 27 March 2023, against Canada. Later in the event, Tribe became the second Jersey cricketer to score an ODI century when he hit 115 not out from 143 deliveries against Papua New Guinea - teammate Josh Lawrenson was the first a few balls earlier in the same match.

Now studying Sports Performance Analysis at Cardiff Metropolitan University, Tribe impressed in his performances for the institution's team in the British Universities and Colleges Sport competition during the summer of 2023 and was offered the chance to play for Glamorgan County Cricket Club 2nd XI. In his four-day debut he scored 164 against Northamptonshire before making an unbeaten 126 against Gloucestershire, going on to amass 456 runs over the season's last four red ball games and being named the Glamorgan 2nd XI Player of the Year.

In September 2023, he was part of the Jersey squad which won their group to reach finals week at the T10 2023 European Cricket Championship in Málaga, Spain.

Tribe signed a two-year rookie-contract with Glamorgan in October 2023.

At the 2023 Channel Islands Sports Personality of the Year, Tribe won the Sure Rising Star award.

On 16 June 2024, Tribe scored two T20I half-centuries in a day as Jersey defeated Denmark 2–0 in a bilateral series in Brondby. He scored 58 as the islanders chased 120 to win the first match by six wickets with 6.2 overs to spare and followed up by smashing 51 from 27 balls as they took the second game by 96 runs.

The following month, Tribe top scored with 23 not out off 15 balls as Jersey defeated Norway by six wickets in the final of the 2024–25 ICC Men's T20 World Cup Europe Qualifier in Germany.

On 21 July 2024, Tribe made his first team debut for Glamorgan in their NCCA showcase 50 over match against Wiltshire, scoring 93 not out off 90 balls including 12 4s and a six.

Tribe made his First-class debut for Glamorgan in a County Championship match against Leicestershire at Sophia Gardens in Cardiff on 29 August 2024. The next month he scored his maiden first-class half-century for Glamorgan in a County Championship match against Yorkshire, making 58 in the second innings. Tribe made it back-to-back 50s by compiling 70 in the club's next match against Gloucestershire.

He was named in Jersey's 14-player squad for the 2024 Cricket World Cup Challenge League A in Kenya and, after missing the opening three matches due to commitments with Glamorgan, he scored 53 in the islanders' win over Kuwait. Tribe then hit 43 off 42 balls in Jersey's victory over Denmark.

Tribe made 58 off 65 balls, including hitting 10 fours, in his first appearance of the 2025 County Championship for Glamorgan against Derbyshire on 2 May 2025. It was his third successive First-class half-century. He followed that up in the next match with 94 in Glamorgan's first innings against Kent.

On 22 June 2025, he made his maiden first-class century, scoring 107 for Glamorgan against Leicestershire at Grace Road.

Tribe was named in the Jersey squad for the T20 World Cup Europe Regional Final in the Netherlands during July 2025.

In August 2025, Tribe scored three List A centuries in successive matches, making 122 not out and 131 not out for Glamorgan in the One-Day Cup against Worcestershire and Leicestershire respectively and then hitting 175 for Jersey in their Cricket World Cup Challenge League A win over Papua New Guinea.

Tribe scored his maiden first-class double century, and the first in the County Championship by a player from Jersey, when he made 206 for Glamorgan against Northamptonshire at the County Cricket Ground, Northampton, on 8 and 9 September 2025. Also in September 2025, he was drafted by the Paarl Royals for the 2026 SA20 and agreed a new contract with Glamorgan tying him into the club until the end of the 2026 season.

On 30 September 2025, Tribe was named in the England Lions squad for their tour of Australia starting in November that year. During the trip he scored a century against Australia A.

In December 2025, Tribe signed a two-year contract extension with Glamorgan to run until the end of the 2028 season. The following month, he was named in the England Lions squad for their white-ball series against the Pakistan Shaheens to take place in the United Arab Emirates in February 2026. Batting at number five in the first T20 match between the teams, Tribe top-scored with 64 not out off 48 balls to lead the Lions to a four-wicket win. Tribe followed this up by making an unbeaten 52 as England Lions won the opening 50 over match of the series by nine wickets.

In March 2026, Tribe was signed by Welsh Fire for £70,000 in the player auction for that year's edition of The Hundred.

Tribe scored 135 for England Lions against South Africa A in the first of a two-match unofficial Test series between the teams at Arundel Castle Cricket Ground in May 2026.

On 22 July 2026, Tribe made his debut appearance in The Hundred, scoring 11 not out to help Welsh Fire to a six-wicket win over Southern Brave at the Utilita Bowl.

In August 2026, it was announced that Paarl Royals had retained Tribe for the 2027 SA20 after he scored 143 runs in nine innings at an average of 20.43 in his first season with the franchise earlier that year.

Tribe made his fifth first-class century, and first in the County Championship Division One, in September 2026, scoring 155 off 337 deliveries, including hitting 16 4s, for Glamorgan against Surrey at The Oval. In his next match he made it back-to-back centuries with 184 off 383 balls in Glamorgan's first innings against Essex at Sophia Gardens, passing 1,000 first-class runs for the season in the process.

He was named in the Jersey squad for the Cricket World Cup Challenge League A final round in Kenya in October 2026. In their second match of the tournament against the hosts, Kenya, Tribe top-scored for his team with 72 from 86 balls in a 123-run win. Tribe left the squad after their third match to join up with the England Lions in Saint Kitts and Nevis but was denied entry due to the Carribbean nation's 21-day non-entry rule for non-nationals who had been in Kenya due to an Ebola outbreak in the African country.

== Personal life ==
Tribe has an older brother, Zak who is also a Jersey international cricketer.
