= 2026 Cricket World Cup Challenge League A (Kenya) =

Cricket tournament

2026 Kenya Cricket World Cup Challenge League A
- Dates: 21 – 31 October 2026
- Administrator: International Cricket Council
- Cricket format: List A
- Tournament format: Round-robin tournament
- Host: Kenya
- Participants: 6
- Matches: 15

The 2026 Kenya Cricket World Cup Challenge League A was the third round of Group A matches of the 2024–2026 Cricket World Cup Challenge League, a cricket tournament that formed part of the qualification pathway to the 2027 Cricket World Cup. The tournament was hosted by Cricket Kenya in October 2026, with all matches having List A status.

Jersey secured a top-two finish, and therefore a place in the 2026 Cricket World Cup Qualifier Play-off, by winning their opening match against Papua New Guinea.

== Warm-up matches ==
Prior to the start of the Challenge League fixtures, the Denmark XI cricket team travelled to South Africa to play warm-up matches against the Tuks 1 cricket team on 16 October 2026 and against the SuperSport Park International Cricket Academy cricket team on 18 October 2026. The Jersey cricket team travelled to Uganda to play two 50-over warm-up matches against the Uganda A cricket team from 17 to 18 October 2026.

Warm-up matches

16 October 2026
Scorecard

Denmark XI; 253/9 (50 overs)	v	Tuks 1; 241 (49.2 overs)
Surya Anand 49 (61); Sandiswa Yeni 2/38 (8 overs)		Ben Hockly 88 (80); Hamid Shah 3/33 (9 overs)

Denmark XI won by 12 runs
Tuks Cricket Oval, Pretoria
Player of the match: Ben Hockly (Tuks 1)

- Denmark XI won the toss and elected to bat.

17 October 2026
Scorecard

Uganda A 118 (33.2 overs)	v	Jersey; 121/1 (27.1 overs)
Steven Wabwose 22 (34); Benjamin Ward 3/20 (8 overs)		Harrison Carlyon 59 (78); Edwin Nuwagaba 1/25 (8 overs)

Jersey won by 9 wickets
Entebbe Cricket Oval, Entebbe
Umpires: Norbert Abbi (Uga) and Emmanuel Kamya (Uga)
Player of the match: Harrison Carlyon (Jer)

- Jersey won the toss and elected to field.
- The match was reduced to 37 overs per side due to rain.

18 October 2026
Scorecard

Jersey; 193/9 (50 overs)	v	Uganda A 134 (41.3 overs)
Harrison Carlyon 49 (80); Musa Majid Ramathan 4/44 (10 overs)		Robert Owilli 53 (99); Benjamin Ward 5/17 (9.3 overs)

Jersey won by 59 runs
Entebbe Cricket Oval, Entebbe
Umpires: Norbert Abbi (Uga) and Emmanuel Kamya (Uga)
Player of the match: Benjamin Ward (Jer)

- Uganda XI won the toss and elected to field.

18 October 2026
Scorecard

SPI Cricket Academy; 341 (49.4 overs)	v	Denmark XI; 196 (42.2 overs)
Keagan Lion-Cachet 134 (86); Saud Munir 3/41 (8.4 overs)		Taranjit Bharaj 44 (51); Jarren Bacher 3/20 (7.2 overs)

SPI Cricket Academy won by 145 runs
Tuks Cricket Oval, Pretoria
Player of the match: Keagan Lion-Cachet (SPICA)

- SPI Cricket Academy won the toss and elected to bat.

== Squads ==
Denmark	Jersey	Kenya	Kuwait	Papua New Guinea	Qatar
Hamid Shah (c); Saif Ahmad; Lucky Ali; Surya Anand; Mustakim Aslam; Taranjit Bharaj (wk); Sebastian Heath (wk); ~~Eshan Karimi~~; Abdullah Mahmood; Saud Munir; Musa Shaheen; Nicholas Sonne-Rudd; Simon Sorensen; Shangeev Thanikaithasan; Shakeel Zeb	Charles Perchard (c); Charlie Brennan; Toby Britton; Harrison Carlyon; Jake Dunford (wk); Jonty Jenner; Josh Lawrenson; William Perchard; George Richardson; Julius Sumerauer; Asa Tribe; Zak Tribe; Scott van Breda; Benjamin Ward	Dhiren Gondaria (c); Sachin Bhudia; Sachin Gill; Brian Likavu; Francis Mutua; Lucas Ndandason; Shem Ngoche; Irfan Karim (wk); Peter Langat; Subham Patel; Rakep Patel; Vishil Patel; Vraj Patel; Sukhdeep Singh (wk)	Mohammed Aslam (c); Clinto Anto; Muhammad Aqif; Meet Bhavsar (wk); Anudeep Chenthamara; Shiraz Khan; Nimish Lathief; Vishwa Nettem; Usman Patel (wk); Yasin Patel; Jude Saldanha; Ravija Sandaruwan; Bilal Tahir; Ali Zaheer	Assad Vala (c); Sese Bau; Gaba Frank; Semo Kamea; John Kariko; Kabua Morea; Alei Nao; Patrick Nou; Aue Oru; Boio Ray; Doko Rupa (wk); Lega Siaka; Dauncey Tom; Tony Ura	Mirza Mohammed Baig (c); Shahzeb Afridi; Owais Ahmed; Zubair Ali; Muhammad Asim; Zeeshan Haider; Shahzaib Jamil (wk); Ikramullah Khan; Imal Liyanage (wk); Daniel Louis; Gayan Munaweera; Akshay Shankar; Obaid ur Rahman; Mujeeb-ur-Rehman

Shakeel Zeb replaced Eshan Karimi in the Denmark squad.

== Fixtures ==
21 October 2026
09:45
Scorecard

Kenya; 324/7 (50 overs)	v	Denmark; 221 (44.1 overs)
Irfan Karim 106 (115); Abdullah Mahmood 2/41 (9 overs)		Hamid Shah 55 (67); Shem Ngoche 3/31 (10 overs)

Kenya won by 103 runs
Gymkhana Club Ground, Nairobi
Umpires: Nitin Bathi (Ned) and Ravindra Kottahachchi (SL)
Player of the match: Irfan Karim (Ken)

- Kenya won the toss and elected to bat.
- Subham Patel (Ken) and Nicholas Sonne-Rudd (Den) both made their List A debuts.

22 October 2026
09:45
Scorecard

Jersey; 347/5 (50 overs)	v	Papua New Guinea; 175 (36.5 overs)
Zak Tribe 150 (129); Aue Oru 2/70 (8 overs)		Kabua Morea 40 (35); Benjamin Ward 5/49 (10 overs)

Jersey won by 172 runs
Gymkhana Club Ground, Nairobi
Umpires: Nitin Bathi (Ned) and Isaac Oyieko (Ken)
Player of the match: Zak Tribe (Jer)

- Jersey won the toss and elected to bat.
- Aue Oru and Doko Rupa (PNG) made his List A debut.
- Benjamin Ward (Jer) took his first five-wicket haul in List A cricket.

22 October 2026
09:45
Scorecard

Kuwait; 331/6 (50 overs)	v	Qatar; 335/5 (45.3 overs)
Meet Bhavsar 120* (106); Owais Ahmed 2/58 (10 overs)		Shahzeb Afridi 105 (57); Shiraz Khan 2/59 (8 overs)

Qatar won by 5 wickets
Ruaraka Sports Club Ground, Nairobi
Umpires: David McLean (Sco) and Chamara de Zoysa (SL)
Player of the match: Shahzeb Afridi (Qat)

- Kuwait won the toss and elected to bat.
- Shahzeb Afridi and Zubair Ali (Qat) both scored their first century in List A cricket.

24 October 2026
09:45
Scorecard

Denmark; 274/8 (50 overs)	v	Kuwait; 172 (29.4 overs)
Musa Shaheen 64 (84); Meet Bhavsar 3/52 (10 overs)		Clinto Anto 52 (27); Saif Ahmad 5/20 (8 overs)

Denmark won by 102 runs
Gymkhana Club Ground, Nairobi
Umpires: David McLean (Sco) and Isaac Oyieko (Ken)
Player of the match: Saif Ahmad (Den)

- Denmark won the toss and elected to bat.
- Simon Sorensen made his List A debut.

24 October 2026
09:45
Scorecard

Qatar; 283 (49.1 overs)	v	Kenya; 279 (48.5 overs)
Zubair Ali 92 (102); Rakep Patel 3/48 (10 overs)		Irfan Karim 86 (105); Owais Ahmed 4/33 (6.5 overs)

Qatar won by 4 runs
Ruaraka Sports Club Ground, Nairobi
Umpires: Arsalaan Premji (Tan) and Chamara de Zoysa (SL)
Player of the match: Owais Ahmed (Qat)

- Kenya won the toss and elected to field.

25 October 2026
09:45
Scorecard

Jersey; 320/9 (50 overs)	v	Kenya; 197 (42 overs)
Asa Tribe 72 (86); Sachin Gill 3/54 (9 overs)		Sachin Gill 60 (61); Benjamin Ward 5/28 (9 overs)

Jersey won by 123 runs
Gymkhana Club Ground, Nairobi
Umpires: Ravindra Kottahachchi (SL) and David McLean (Sco)
Player of the match: Benjamin Ward (Jer)

- Jersey won the toss and elected to bat.
- Toby Britton (Jer) made his List A debut.

25 October 2026
09:45
Scorecard

Denmark; 304/6 (50 overs)	v	Papua New Guinea; 307/6 (49.1 overs)
Lucky Ali 114* (111); Semo Kamea 3/64 (10 overs)		Lega Siaka 83 (81); Abdullah Mahmood 4/42 (10 overs)

Papua New Guinea won by 4 wickets
Ruaraka Sports Club Ground, Nairobi
Umpires: Nitin Bathi (Ned) and Arsalaan Premji (Tan)
Player of the match: Tony Ura (PNG)

- Papua New Guinea won the toss and elected to field.
- Dauncey Tom (PNG) made his List A debut.

27 October 2026
09:45
Scorecard

Papua New Guinea; 155 (36.3 overs)	v	Qatar; 157/1 (14.5 overs)
Tony Ura 52 (44); Muhammad Asim 5/34 (10 overs)		Shahzeb Afridi 85 (35); Kabua Morea 1/54 (5.5 overs)

Qatar won by 9 wickets
Gymkhana Club Ground, Nairobi
Umpires: David McLean (Sco) and Arsalaan Premji (Tan)
Player of the match: Muhammad Asim (Qat)

- Papua New Guinea won the toss and elected to bat.

27 October 2026
09:45
Scorecard

Jersey; 224 (50 overs)	v	Kuwait; 225/3 (33.4 overs)
Charlie Brennan 43 (54); Meet Bhavsar 5/25 (8 overs)		Clinto Anto 113 (77); Benjamin Ward 2/35 (8 overs)

Kuwait won by 7 wickets
Ruaraka Sports Club Ground, Nairobi
Umpires: Nitin Bathi (Ned) and Chamara de Zoysa (SL)
Player of the match: Clinto Anto (Kuw)

- Kuwait won the toss and elected to field.
- Scott van Breda (Jer) made his List A debut.

28 October 2026
09:45
Scorecard

Denmark; 120 (36.2 overs)	v	Qatar; 68 (16.2 overs)
Hamid Shah 44 (61); Muhammad Asim 3/15 (7 overs)		Shahzeb Afridi 21 (9); Abdullah Mahmood 4/15 (6 overs)

Denmark won by 52 runs
Gymkhana Club Ground, Nairobi
Umpires: Ravindra Kottahachchi (SL) and Isaac Oyieko (Ken)
Player of the match: Saif Ahmad (Den)

- Denmark won the toss and elected to bat.

28 October 2026
09:45
Scorecard

Kuwait; 367/9 (50 overs)	v	Kenya; 217 (43 overs)
Ravija Sandaruwan 162 (114); Shem Ngoche 3/49 (10 overs)		Subham Patel 57 (46); Mohammed Aslam 4/33 (10 overs)

Kuwait won by 150 runs
Ruaraka Sports Club Ground, Nairobi
Umpires: Nitin Bathi (Ned) and Arsalaan Premji (Tan)
Player of the match: Ravija Sandaruwan (Kuw)

- Kenya won the toss and elected to field.

30 October 2026
09:45
Scorecard

Papua New Guinea; 119 (39.3 overs)	v	Kuwait; 123/0 (21.3 overs)
Aue Oru 25 (43); Yasin Patel 4/24 (10 overs)		Clinto Anto 76* (67)

Kuwait won by 10 wickets
Gymkhana Club Ground, Nairobi
Umpires: Ravindra Kottahachchi (SL) and Isaac Oyieko (Ken)
Player of the match: Yasin Patel (Kuw)

- Kuwait won the toss and elected to field.
- Jude Saldanha (Kuw) made his List A debut.

30 October 2026
09:45
Scorecard

Jersey; 312/8 (50 overs)	v	Denmark; 240 (47.5 overs)
Jonty Jenner 81 (53); Abdullah Mahmood 4/63 (10 overs)		Lucky Ali 66 (78); Benjamin Ward 3/38 (10 overs)

Jersey won by 72 runs
Ruaraka Sports Club Ground, Nairobi
Umpires: Chamara de Zoysa (SL) and Arsalaan Premji (Tan)
Player of the match: Jonty Jenner (Jer)

- Denmark won the toss and elected to field.
- William Perchard (Jer) made his List A debut.

31 October 2026
09:45
Scorecard

Kenya; 230/7 (38 overs)	v	Papua New Guinea; 142 (30.1 overs)
Dhiren Gondaria 68 (84); Kabua Morea 2/47 (8 overs)		Assad Vala 42 (40); Vraj Patel 3/25 (6.1 overs)

Kenya won by 88 runs
Gymkhana Club Ground, Nairobi
Umpires: Chamara de Zoysa (SL) and David McLean (Sco)
Player of the match: Francis Mutua (Ken)

- Papua New Guinea won the toss and elected to field.
- The match was reduced to 38 overs per side due to rain.
- Brian Likavu (Ken) made his List A debut.

31 October 2026
09:45
Scorecard

Jersey; 194/8 (24 overs)	v	Qatar; 160 (22.2 overs)
Zak Tribe 53 (42); Mirza Mohammed Baig 3/25 (5 overs)		Zubair Ali 54 (43); Zak Tribe 4/16 (3 overs)

Jersey won by 34 runs
Ruaraka Sports Club Ground, Nairobi
Umpires: Ravindra Kottahachchi (SL) and Isaac Oyieko (Ken)
Player of the match: Zak Tribe (Jer)

- Qatar won the toss and elected to field.
- The match was reduced to 24 overs per side due to rain.
