= Aman Gandhi =

Aman Gandhi may refer to:

- Aman Gandhi (cricketer)
- Aman Gandhi (actor)
