= 2022 Cricket World Cup Challenge League A (Canada) =

Cricket tournament

2022 Canada Cricket World Cup Challenge League A
- Dates: 27 July – 6 August 2022
- Administrator(s): International Cricket Council
- Cricket format: List A
- Tournament format(s): Round-robin
- Host(s): Cricket Canada
- Participants: 6
- Matches: 15
- Most runs: (Denmark) Hamid Shah (379)
- Most wickets: (Denmark) Nicolaj Laegsgaard (15)

The 2022 Canada Cricket World Cup Challenge League A was played in Canada in July and August 2022. It was the second round of matches in Group A of the 2019–2022 Cricket World Cup Challenge League, a cricket tournament which forms part of the qualification pathway to the 2023 Cricket World Cup. All of the matches have List A status, and were played at the Maple Leaf North-West Ground in King City, Ontario. Originally, the tournament was scheduled to take place in August 2021, but was postponed by a year due to the COVID-19 pandemic.

== Squads ==
Canada	Denmark	Malaysia	Qatar	Singapore	Vanuatu
Navneet Dhaliwal (c); Saad Bin Zafar (vc); Jeremy Gordon; Dillon Heyliger; Ammar Khalid; Nicholas Kirton; Shreyas Movva (wk); Salman Nazar; Rayyan Pathan; Rommel Shahzad; Varun Sehdev; Ravinderpal Singh; Matthew Spoors; Harsh Thaker	Frederik Klokker (c); Saif Ahmad; Surya Anand; ~~Taranjit Bharaj~~ (Note: Not traveling with the squad because of visa delays.) (wk); Oliver Hald; Abdul Hashmi (wk); ~~Jino Jojo~~; ~~Amjad Khan~~; Zameer Khan; Nicolaj Laegsgaard; Rizwan Mahmood; Saud Munir; Hamid Shah (vc); Musa Shaheen; Shangeev Thanikaithasan	Ahmad Faiz (c); Muhammad Amir; Syed Aziz; Ainool Hafizs; Khizar Hayat; Saif Ullah Malik; Dhivendran Mogan; Sharvin Muniandy; Anwar Rahman; Muhamad Syahadat; Pavandeep Singh; Virandeep Singh; Vijay Unni; Muhammad Wafiq	Mohammed Rizlan (c); Akash Babu; Assad Borham; Andri Berenger; Iqbal Hussain; Zaheer Ibrahim; Ikramullah Khan; Kamran Khan; Imal Liyanage; Gayan Munaweera; Muhammad Murad; Mohammed Nadeem; Imraz Raffi; Musawar Shah; Muhammad Tanveer; Sandun Withanage	Amjad Mahboob (c); Vinoth Baskaran; Surendran Chandramohan; Aman Desai; Rezza Gaznavi; Neil Karnik; Anantha Krishna; Arjun Mutreja; Anish Paraam; Navin Param; Janak Prakash; Akshay Puri; Rohan Rangarajan; Manpreet Singh; Aryaman Sunil	~~Patrick Matautaava~~ (c); Andrew Mansale (Note: Andrew Mansale captained Vanuatu for the tournament in Matautaava's absence.) (c); Junior Kaltapau (vc); Jarryd Allan; Williamsing Nalisa; Nalin Nipiko; Simpson Obed; Joshua Rasu; Rival Samson; Apolinaire Stephen; Ronald Tari; Jamal Vira; Bettan Viraliliu; Darren Wotu; Obed Yosef

Rival Samson was named as traveling reserve in Vanuatu's squad. Abdullah Mahmood and Adam Leigh were named as travelling reserve in Denmark's squad, due to visa delays for Taranjit Bharaj and Jino Jojo.

== Fixtures ==
27 July 2022
10:00
Scorecard

Canada; 219/8 (50 overs)	v	Denmark; 145 (43.2 overs)
Nicholas Kirton 48 (82); Hamid Shah 2/31 (10 overs)		Surya Anand 39 (81); Dillon Heyliger 5/34 (8 overs)

Canada won by 74 runs
Maple Leaf North-West Ground, King City
Umpires: Jermaine Lindo (USA) and Vijaya Mallela (USA)
Player of the match: Dillon Heyliger (Can)

- Denmark won the toss and elected to field.
- Ammar Khalid, Varun Sehdev, Matthew Spoors (Can), Saif Ahmad, Surya Anand, Saud Munir, Musa Shaheen and Shangeev Thanikaithasan (Den) all made their List A debuts.
- Dillon Heyliger (Can) took his first five-wicket haul in List A cricket.

28 July 2022
10:00
Scorecard

Singapore; 244/9 (50 overs)	v	Qatar; 213/9 (42 overs)
Aryaman Sunil 52* (34); Ikramullah Khan 3/48 (10 overs)		Mohammed Rizlan 52 (77); Aryaman Sunil 3/39 (9 overs)

Singapore won by 7 runs (DLS method)
Maple Leaf North-West Ground, King City
Umpires: Emmerson Carrington (Ber) and Harry Grewal (Can)
Player of the match: Aryaman Sunil (Sin)

- Qatar won the toss and elected to field.
- Qatar were set a revised target of 221 runs from 42 overs due to rain.
- Akash Babu, Muhammad Murad, Muhammad Tanveer (Qat), Anish Paraam and Akshay Puri (Sin) all made their List A debuts.

28 July 2022
10:00
Scorecard

Malaysia; 124 (37.5 overs)	v	Vanuatu; 125/8 (32.3 overs)
Khizar Hayat 42* (66); Nalin Nipiko 3/42 (10 overs)		Jarryd Allan 39* (41); Syed Aziz 5/36 (10 overs)

Vanuatu won by 2 wickets
Maple Leaf North-East Ground, King City
Umpires: Jermaine Lindo (USA) and Arnold Maddela (Can)
Player of the match: Jarryd Allan (Van)

- Malaysia won the toss and elected to bat.
- Ainool Hafizs, Khizar Hayat, Sharvin Muniandy, Vijay Unni, Muhammad Wafiq (Mas), Jarryd Allan, Junior Kaltapau, Rival Samson, Bettan Viraliliu and Obed Yosef (Van) all made their List A debuts.
- Syed Aziz (Mas) took his first five-wicket haul in List A cricket.

30 July 2022
10:00
Scorecard

Denmark; 285/8 (50 overs)	v	Vanuatu; 158 (38.3 overs)
Hamid Shah 85 (128); Rival Samson 2/38 (5 overs)		Andrew Mansale 68* (88); Nicolaj Laegsgaard 4/26 (10 overs)

Denmark won by 127 runs
Maple Leaf North-West Ground, King City
Umpires: Harry Grewal (Can) and Jermaine Lindo (USA)
Player of the match: Nicolaj Laegsgaard (Den)

- Vanuatu won the toss and elected to field.

30 July 2022
10:00
Scorecard

Singapore; 188 (49.2 overs)	v	Canada; 190/4 (41.2 overs)
Anish Paraam 57 (91); Jeremy Gordon 2/40 (9 overs)		Navneet Dhaliwal 100* (108); Anish Paraam 2/23 (4 overs)

Canada won by 6 wickets
Maple Leaf North-East Ground, King City
Umpires: Emmerson Carrington (Ber) and Vijaya Mallela (USA)
Player of the match: Navneet Dhaliwal (Can)

- Canada won the toss and elected to field.

31 July 2022
10:00
Scorecard

Canada; 239/8 (50 overs)	v	Malaysia; 118 (29.3 overs)
Harsh Thaker 57* (72); Dhivendran Mogan 2/29 (4 overs)		Sharvin Muniandy 48 (65); Saad Bin Zafar 5/31 (8.3 overs)

Canada won by 121 runs
Maple Leaf North-West Ground, King City
Umpires: Jermaine Lindo (USA) and Vijaya Mallela (USA)
Player of the match: Saad Bin Zafar (Can)

- Canada won the toss and elected to bat.

31 July 2022
10:00
Scorecard

Denmark; 267/7 (50 overs)	v	Qatar; 180 (43.5 overs)
Hamid Shah 69 (98); Muhammad Murad 4/62 (10 overs)		Muhammad Tanveer 80 (110); Saif Ahmad 4/29 (8.5 overs)

Denmark won by 87 runs
Maple Leaf North-East Ground, King City
Umpires: Emmerson Carrington (Ber) and Arnold Maddela (Can)
Player of the match: Saif Ahmad (Can)

- Qatar won the toss and elected to field.

2 August 2022
10:00
Scorecard

Qatar; 293/8 (50 overs)	v	Vanuatu; 197 (44.4 overs)
Mohammed Rizlan 77 (92); Darren Wotu 2/28 (5 overs)		Junior Kaltapau 67 (97); Akash Babu 3/45 (10 overs)

Qatar won by 96 runs
Maple Leaf North-West Ground, King City
Umpires: Harry Grewal (Can) and Arnold Maddela (Can)
Player of the match: Mohammed Rizlan (Qat)

- Vanuatu won the toss and elected to field.
- Sandun Withanage (Qat) and Darren Wotu (Van) both made their List A debuts.

2 August 2022
10:00
Scorecard

Malaysia; 210/8 (50 overs)	v	Singapore; 213/6 (45.2 overs)
Virandeep Singh 65 (109); Janak Prakash 4/34 (10 overs)		Anish Paraam 93* (102); Syed Aziz 2/42 (7.2 overs)

Singapore won by 4 wickets
Maple Leaf North-East Ground, King City
Umpires: Emmerson Carrington (Ber) and Jermaine Lindo (USA)
Player of the match: Anish Paraam (Sin)

- Malaysia won the toss and elected to bat.
- Muhammad Amir and Saif Ullah Malik (Mas) both made their List A debuts.

3 August 2022
10:00
Scorecard

Denmark; 297/7 (50 overs)	v	Singapore; 296 (49.5 overs)
Hamid Shah 138 (133); Amjad Mahboob 2/45 (10 overs)		Rohan Rangarajan 87 (91); Surya Anand 3/44 (8 overs)

Denmark won by 1 run
Maple Leaf North-West Ground, King City
Umpires: Harry Grewal (Can) and Arnold Maddela (Can)
Player of the match: Hamid Shah (Den)

- Denmark won the toss and elected to bat.
- Aman Desai (Sin) made his List A debut.

3 August 2022
10:00
Scorecard

Canada; 275/9 (50 overs)	v	Qatar; 91 (25.5 overs)
Navneet Dhaliwal 103 (116); Mohammed Nadeem 3/41 (10 overs)		Zaheer Ibrahim 34 (38); Jeremy Gordon 4/22 (6 overs)

Canada won by 184 runs
Maple Leaf North-East Ground, King City
Umpires: Emmerson Carrington (Ber) and Vijaya Mallela (USA)
Player of the match: Navneet Dhaliwal (Can)

- Canada won the toss and elected to bat.
- Assad Borham (Qat) made his List A debut.

5 August 2022
10:00
Scorecard

Canada; 246/4 (38 overs)	v	Vanuatu; 42 (17.3 overs)
Nicholas Kirton 108* (95); Nalin Nipiko 2/19 (5 overs)		Joshua Rasu 10 (25); Rommel Shahzad 4/8 (4.3 overs)

Canada won by 204 runs
Maple Leaf North-West Ground, King City
Umpires: Emmerson Carrington (Ber) and Jermaine Lindo (USA)
Player of the match: Nicholas Kirton (Can)

- Vanuatu won the toss and elected to field.
- The match was reduced to 38 overs per side due to rain.
- Rommel Shahzad (Can) made his List A debut.

5 August 2022
10:00
Scorecard

Denmark; 242/6 (49 overs)	v	Malaysia; 151 (40 overs)
Saif Ahmad 92* (103); Anwar Rahman 3/46 (10 overs)		Ahmad Faiz 57 (89); Nicolaj Laegsgaard 6/6 (9 overs)

Denmark won by 91 runs
Maple Leaf North-East Ground, King City
Umpires: Harry Grewal (Can) and Vijaya Mallela (USA)
Player of the match: Nicolaj Laegsgaard (Den)

- Malaysia won the toss and elected to field.
- The match was reduced to 49 overs per side due to rain.

6 August 2022
10:00
Scorecard

Qatar; 181/9 (50 overs)	v	Malaysia; 177 (47.5 overs)
Imraz Raffi 47* (77); Muhamad Syahadat 3/24 (9 overs)		Muhammad Amir 71* (103); Muhammad Tanveer 3/14 (8 overs)

Qatar won by 4 runs
Maple Leaf North-West Ground, King City
Umpires: Emmerson Carrington (Ber) and Vijaya Mallela (USA)
Player of the match: Muhammad Amir (Mas)

- Qatar won the toss and elected to bat.

6 August 2022
10:00
Scorecard

Vanuatu; 111 (29.4 overs)	v	Singapore; 113/4 (14.2 overs)
Jarryd Allan 29 (53); Janak Prakash 3/18 (6 overs)		Anish Paraam 40* (30); Williamsing Nalisa 2/18 (2.2 overs)

Singapore won by 6 wickets
Maple Leaf North-East Ground, King City
Umpires: Harry Grewal (Can) and Arnold Maddela (Can)
Player of the match: Janak Prakash (Sin)

- Vanuatu won the toss and elected to bat.
