= 2025 Men's T20 World Cup Europe Regional Final =

Qualifying tournament for the 2026 T20WC

2025 ICC Men's T20 World Cup Europe Regional Final
- Dates: 5 – 11 July 2025
- Administrator: ICC Europe
- Cricket format: Round-robin
- Tournament format: Twenty20 International
- Host: Netherlands
- Champions: Netherlands
- Runners-up: Italy
- Participants: 5
- Matches: 10
- Player of the series: (Italy) Harry Manenti
- Most runs: (Netherlands) Max O'Dowd (204)
- Most wickets: (Italy) Harry Manenti (8)

The 2025 ICC Men's T20 World Cup Europe Regional Final was a cricket tournament that formed part of the qualification process for the 2026 Men's T20 World Cup. It was held in the Netherlands in July 2025.

Netherlands won the tournament, while Italy qualified for a World Cup for the first time by clinching second place ahead of Jersey on net run-rate after the two teams finished level on points.

They will join England and Ireland as Europe's representatives at the 2026 T20 World Cup. England qualified directly as a top eight team from the previous edition, while Ireland qualified directly through ICC Men's T20I Team Rankings.

== Teams and qualification ==
In this cycle, a total of 30 teams participated in the European sub-regional phase, which was divided into three events with ten teams competing in each event in two groups of five.

The winners of each sub-regional qualifier advanced to the regional final, where they joined Scotland and Netherlands who received a bye after participating in the 2024 ICC Men's T20 World Cup. Italy advanced from Qualifier A, Jersey advanced from Qualifier B, and Guernsey advanced from Qualifier C.

Method of qualification	Date	Venue(s)	No. of teams	Team
2024 ICC Men's T20 World Cup	29 June 2024	United States; West Indies	2	Netherlands
2024 ICC Men's T20 World Cup	29 June 2024	United States; West Indies	2	Scotland
Europe Qualifier A	9 – 16 June 2024	Italy	1	Italy
Europe Qualifier B	7 – 14 July 2024	Germany	1	Jersey
Europe Qualifier C	21 – 28 August 2024	Guernsey	1	Guernsey
Total			5	

== Squads ==
Guernsey	Italy	Jersey	Netherlands	Scotland
Oliver Nightingale (c); Martin-Dale Bradley (vc); Luke Bichard; Charles Birch; Alex Bushell; Josh Butler; Isaac Damarell (wk); Ben Ferbrache; Ben Fitchet; Charlie Forshaw; Harry Johnson; Adam Martel; Tom Nightingale; Anthony Stokes; Matthew Stokes	Joe Burns (c); Harry Manenti (vc); Marcus Campopiano; Thomas Draca; Emilio Gay; Crishan Kalugamage; Bilal Khan; Zain Ali; Ben Manenti; Gian-Piero Meade (wk); Anthony Mosca; Justin Mosca; Syed Naqvi; Jaspreet Singh; Grant Stewart	Charles Perchard (c); Dominic Blampied; Charlie Brennan; Harrison Carlyon; Jake Dunford (wk); Patrick Gouge (wk); Nick Greenwood; Jonty Jenner; William Perchard; Theo Pullman; George Richardson; Julius Sumerauer; Asa Tribe; Zak Tribe; Benjamin Ward	Scott Edwards (c, wk); Noah Croes (wk); Bas de Leede; Daniel Doram; Aryan Dutt; Kyle Klein; Ryan Klein; Michael Levitt; Zach Lion-Cachet; Teja Nidamanuru; Max O'Dowd; Hidde Overdijk; Roelof van der Merwe; Paul van Meekeren; Saqib Zulfiqar	Richie Berrington (c); Matthew Cross (wk); Brad Currie; Jasper Davidson; Chris Greaves; Oli Hairs; Jack Jarvis; Michael Leask; Christopher McBride; Finlay McCreath; Brandon McMullen; George Munsey; Safyaan Sharif; Charlie Tear (wk); Mark Watt

== Warm-up matches ==
1 July 2025
11:00
Scorecard

Scotland; 151/7 (20 overs)	v	Jersey; 129/9 (20 overs)
Richie Berrington 36 (26); Nick Greenwood 4/28 (4 overs)		Zak Tribe 30 (24); Christopher McBride 2/17 (2 overs)

Scotland won by 22 runs
Sportpark Maarschalkerweerd, Utrecht
Umpires: Maulik Prabhudesai (Ned) and Jacques Westerberg (Ned)

- Jersey won the toss and elected to field.

1 July 2025
16:00
Scorecard

Netherlands; 164/6 (20 overs)	v	Guernsey; 105/9 (20 overs)
Michael Levitt 70 (46); Charlie Forshaw 3/26 (4 overs)		Isaac Damarell 20 (21); Zach Lion-Cachet 3/11 (3 overs)

Netherlands won by 59 runs
Sportpark Maarschalkerweerd, Utrecht
Umpires: Russell Warren (Eng) and Jacques Westerberg (Ned)

- Netherlands won the toss and elected to bat.

2 July 2025
11:00
Scorecard

Italy; 169/6 (20 overs)	v	Guernsey; 113/7 (20 overs)
Syed Naqvi 36 (21); Harry Johnson 3/35 (4 overs)		Oliver Nightingale 23* (22); Benjamin Manenti 2/12 (4 overs)

Italy won by 56 runs
Sportpark Maarschalkerweerd, Utrecht
Umpires: Rizwan Akram (Ned) and Adwait Deshpande (Ned)

- Italy won the toss and elected to bat.

3 July 2025
11:00
Scorecard

Scotland; 166/5 (20 overs)	v	Italy; 127/9 (20 overs)
Michael Leask 41* (22); Crishan Kalugamage 2/30 (4 overs)		Jaspreet Singh 31* (28); Brandon McMullen 2/16 (2 overs)

Scotland won by 39 runs
Sportpark Maarschalkerweerd, Utrecht
Umpires: Maulik Prabhudesai (Ned) and Jnanesh Kolli (Ned)

- Italy won the toss and elected to field.

3 July 2025
16:00
Scorecard

Jersey; 102 (19 overs)	v	Netherlands; 103/1 (15.3 overs)
Charlie Brennan 20 (23); Daniel Doram 3/5 (2 overs)		Zach Lion-Cachet 53* (49); Benjamin Ward 1/23 (4 overs)

Netherlands won by 9 wickets
Sportpark Maarschalkerweerd, Utrecht
Umpires: Jnanesh Kolli (Ned) and Russell Warren (Eng)

- Jersey won the toss and elected to bat.

== Points table ==
Final standings
Pos	Team	Pld	W	L	NR	Pts	NRR	Qualification
1	Netherlands (H)	4	3	1	0	6	1.281	Qualified for the 2026 Men's T20 World Cup
2	Italy	4	2	1	1	5	0.612	Qualified for the 2026 Men's T20 World Cup
3	Jersey	4	2	1	1	5	0.306	Eliminated
4	Scotland (Note: Although Scotland were eliminated in the qualifier; they qualified for the tournament based on ICC Rankings to replace Bangladesh after the latter's withdrawal.)	4	1	2	1	3	−0.117	Qualified for the 2026 Men's T20 World Cup
5	Guernsey	4	0	3	1	1	−2.517	Eliminated

Source: Cricinfo
(H) Host

== Fixtures ==
5 July 2025
11:00
Scorecard

Jersey; 160/7 (20 overs)	v	Netherlands; 161/3 (19.3 overs)
Zak Tribe 39 (33); Kyle Klein 3/42 (4 overs)		Max O'Dowd 62 (48); Charles Perchard 2/26 (4 overs)

Netherlands won by 7 wickets
Sportpark Westvliet, Voorburg
Umpires: Roland Black (Ire) and Russell Warren (Eng)
Player of the match: Scott Edwards (Ned)

- Netherlands won the toss and elected to field.

5 July 2025
16:00
Scorecard

Guernsey; 122/9 (20 overs)	v	Italy; 127/3 (14 overs)
Tom Nightingale 35 (26); Harry Manenti 3/17 (4 overs)		Justin Mosca 66* (37); Harry Johnson 1/18 (2 overs)

Italy won by 7 wickets
Sportpark Westvliet, Voorburg
Umpires: Aidan Seaver (Ire) and Russell Warren (Eng)
Player of the match: Justin Mosca (Ita)

- Italy won the toss and elected to field.
- Emilio Gay (Ita) made his T20I debut.

6 July 2025
11:00
Scorecard

Guernsey	v	Scotland

Match abandoned
Sportpark Westvliet, Voorburg
Umpires: Roland Black (Ire) and Aidan Seaver (Ire)

- No toss.
- No play was possible due to rain.

6 July 2025
16:00
Scorecard

Italy	v	Jersey

Match abandoned
Sportpark Westvliet, Voorburg
Umpires: Aidan Seaver (Ire) and Russell Warren (Eng)

- No toss.
- No play was possible due to rain.

8 July 2025
11:00
Scorecard

Jersey; 160/4 (20 overs)	v	Guernsey; 138/5 (20 overs)
Harrison Carlyon 63 (50); Luke Bichard 2/26 (4 overs)		Matthew Stokes 62* (49); Harrison Carlyon 2/8 (4 overs)

Jersey won by 22 runs
Sportpark Westvliet, Voorburg
Umpires: Roland Black (Ire) and Russell Warren (Eng)
Player of the match: Harrison Carlyon (Jer)

- Guernsey won the toss and elected to field.

8 July 2025
16:00
Scorecard

Scotland; 148/9 (20 overs)	v	Netherlands; 142/7 (20 overs)
Oli Hairs 52 (35); Bas de Leede 3/17 (4 overs)		Noah Croes 52* (35); Chris Greaves 3/26 (4 overs)

Scotland won by 6 runs
Sportpark Westvliet, Voorburg
Umpires: Roland Black (Ire) and Aidan Seaver (Ire)
Player of the match: Chris Greaves (Sco)

- Scotland won the toss and elected to bat.

9 July 2025
11:00
Scorecard

Italy; 167/6 (20 overs)	v	Scotland; 155/5 (20 overs)
Emilio Gay 50 (21); Michael Leask 3/18 (3 overs)		George Munsey 72 (61); Harry Manenti 5/31 (4 overs)

Italy won by 12 runs
Sportpark Westvliet, Voorburg
Umpires: Roland Black (Ire) and Russell Warren (Eng)
Player of the match: Harry Manenti (Ita)

- Italy won the toss and elected to bat.
- Harry Manenti (Ita) took his first five-wicket haul in T20Is.

9 July 2025
16:00
Scorecard

Netherlands; 172/1 (20 overs)	v	Guernsey; 99/9 (20 overs)
Max O'Dowd 92* (57); Martin-Dale Bradley 1/28 (4 overs)		Martin-Dale Bradley 26 (25); Michael Levitt 3/11 (3 overs)

Netherlands won by 73 runs
Sportpark Westvliet, Voorburg
Umpires: Aidan Seaver (Ire) and Russell Warren (Eng)
Player of the match: Max O'Dowd (Ned)

- Netherlands won the toss and elected to bat.

11 July 2025
11:00
Scorecard

Scotland; 133/7 (20 overs)	v	Jersey; 134/9 (20 overs)
Matthew Cross 43* (40); Harrison Carlyon 3/26 (4 overs)		Nick Greenwood 49 (36); Mark Watt 2/22 (4 overs)

Jersey won by 1 wicket
Sportpark Westvliet, Voorburg
Umpires: Roland Black (Ire) and Aidan Seaver (Ire)
Player of the match: Nick Greenwood (Jer)

- Jersey won the toss and elected to field.
- Scotland were eliminated as a result of this match. Later invited to 2026 T20 World Cup by ICC via T20I Ranking (14th) after withdrawal of Bangladesh.

11 July 2025
16:00
Scorecard

Italy; 134/7 (20 overs)	v	Netherlands; 135/1 (16.2 overs)
Ben Manenti 30 (27); Roelof van der Merwe 3/15 (4 overs)		Max O'Dowd 47* (42); Crishan Kalugamage 1/25 (4 overs)

Netherlands won by 9 wickets
Sportpark Westvliet, Voorburg
Umpires: Roland Black (Ire) and Russell Warren (Eng)
Player of the match: Roelof van der Merwe (Ned)

- Italy won the toss and elected to bat.
- Both Italy and the Netherlands qualified for 2026 T20 World Cup as a result of this match.
