= Charlie Brennan =

Jersey cricketer (born 2005)

Personal information
- Full name: Charlie Brennan
- Born: 23 September 2005 (age 21)
- Batting: Left-handed
- Bowling: Right-arm Medium fast
- Role: Batsman

International information
- National side: Jersey (2021–present)
- T20I debut (cap 19): 19 October 2021 v Germany
- Last T20I: 23 May 2026 v Guernsey

Career statistics
| Competition | T20I | LA |
|---|---|---|
| Matches | 34 | 13 |
| Runs scored | 401 | 159 |
| Batting average | 20.05 | 17.66 |
| 100s/50s | 0/2 | 0/0 |
| Top score | 67* | 43 |
| Catches/stumpings | 11/– | 3/– |
- Source: Cricinfo, 3 November 2026

Charlie Brennan (born 23 September 2005) is a cricketer who plays internationally for Jersey.

== Cricket career ==
Having been involved with Jersey's cricket performance programme since the age of 10, Brennan was still only 16 when he got his first call-up to the island's senior squad for the ICC T20I World Cup Europe qualifier tournament in October 2021 at Desert Springs Cricket Ground, Almería, Spain. He went on to make his full international debut in the event against Germany on 19 October.

Brennan was named Jersey Cricket Young Player of the Year in 2022 after a season which saw him further establish himself in the senior national squad as well as captaining Jersey to victory over Guernsey in the under-18s version of the inter-insular Muratti competition.

He scored his first international half-century on 7 July 2023, when he hit 67 not out in the opening contest of the home three-match T20I inter-insular series against neighbours Guernsey, earning himself player of the match honours in the process.

Later that month he was part of the Jersey squad for the ICC Men's T20 World Cup Europe Qualifier event in Edinburgh, Scotland. The highlight of the tournament for Brennan was scoring 43 in a 28-run win over Denmark as Jersey finished fourth.

Switching to the 50-over format in August 2023, Brennan was selected among the Jersey contingent to compete in the Netherlands at the European play-offs for 2024 ICC Under-19 Cricket World Cup qualification where they finished third in the six-team competition.

In September 2023, he was a member of the Jersey team which won their group to reach finals week at the T10 2023 European Cricket Championship in Málaga, Spain. Brennan scored 59 off 26 balls as Jersey defeated Guernsey in the qualifying round to advance straight through to the group final where they beat Belgium.

Returning to Málaga in March 2024, Brennan helped his club side, Old Victorians, make it into championship week at the fourth edition of the T10 European Cricket League. He scored 20 off 12 balls in a 76-run opening partnership with international teammate Jonty Jenner as the Jersey team defeated Swiss outfit Olten in the group C final.

Back on international duty, Brennan was part of the squad for Jersey's away series' against Spain in April 2024 and Denmark in June 2024.

Brennan was selected in the Jersey squad for the 2024 T20I Inter-insular Cup against Guernsey. He was among the 14-man squad named for the T20 World Cup European sub-regional qualifier held in Germany in July 2024. During the group stages Brennan made his second T20I half-century, scoring 52 off 25 balls including hitting five sixes, in a win against Switzerland. He also top scored in the victory over Belgium, compiling 40 not out off 22 balls. In the final, Brennan made 17 not out off 10 balls as Jersey defeated Norway by six wickets.

On 7 September 2024, Brennan scored 13 not out off 15 balls to guide Jersey to a two wicket win with just one ball to spare against Guernsey in the Inter-Insular Trophy one-day match. Later that month he was named in Jersey's 14-player squad for the 2024 Cricket World Cup Challenge League A in Kenya and made his List A debut in the islanders' opening match against the hosts. In the second match against Qatar, Brennan scored 31 off 22 balls in a 78-run partnership with Zak Tribe to help Jersey to a 168-run victory.

He was named in the Jersey squad for the 2025 Men's T20 World Cup Europe Regional Final and scored 32 not out against the Netherlands in the islanders' opening match.

Brennan was included in the Jersey squad for the 2026 Men's T20 World Cup Europe Sub-regional Qualifier A in Cyprus. During the tournament final against Guernsey, he scored 20 in a 39-run sixth wicket partnership with Zak Tribe as Jersey recovered from 61 for 5 to win by four-wickets.

On 11 July 2026, Brennan was named player of the match after scoring 86 not out to lead Old Victorians to an eight-wicket win over RGA Walkovers in the Jersey Premier T20 final. He continued his good form two days later when he made 82 not out for Jersey in a 50 over match against Nepal at Grainville.

Brennan was included in the Jersey squad for the Cricket World Cup Challenge League A final round in Kenya in October 2026. In their third match at the tournament against Kuwait, he was his team's top scorer with 43. Brennan's other major contribution at the event was an innings of 33 from 24 balls, including two 4s and two 6s, as Jersey defeated Qatar by 34 runs in their final match which was shortened to 24 overs per side due to rain.

== Football career ==
Brennan has captained the Jersey under-18s football team including leading them to victory in the age-group Muratti final against Guernsey in March 2024. He has also played for the island's under-21s.
