= Toby Britton =

Jersey cricketer (born 2006)

Personal information
- Born: 25 July 2006 (age 20)
- Bowling: Left-arm Off spin
- Role: Bowler

International information
- National side: Jersey (2024–present)
- Only T20I (cap 26): 23 June 2024 v Guernsey

Career statistics
Competition	T20I	LA
Matches	1	2
Runs scored	–	0
Batting average	–	–
100s/50s	–/–	0/0
Top score	–	0*
Balls bowled	24	36
Wickets	2	1
Bowling average	5.25	38.00
5 wickets in innings	0	0
10 wickets in match	0	0
Best bowling	2/21	1/38
Catches/stumpings	0/–	0/–
- Source: Cricinfo, 29 October 2026

Toby Britton (born 25 July 2006) is a cricketer who plays internationally for Jersey.

== Career ==
Britton played a key-role as Farmers Cricket Club reached finals week at the T10 2023 European Cricket League in Málaga, Spain, taking 3/13 in the qualifying round against Danish side Svanholm as they advanced straight through to the group final where he claimed a further two wickets as the Jersey outfit defeated the same opposition.

Still only aged 16 when the tournament started, he was part of the Jersey squad for the ICC Men's T20 World Cup Europe Qualifier event in Edinburgh, Scotland, in July 2023, although he did not make an appearance.

The next month Britton was among the Jersey squad which finished third at the ICC U19 European World Cup qualifier held in the Netherlands in August 2023.

In September 2023, Britton made his debut for the senior Jersey team, taking 1/30 off eight overs as the islanders beat neighbours Guernsey in the annual Inter-insular 50-over match.

Later that month he was a member of the Jersey team which won their group to reach finals week at the T10 2023 European Cricket Championship in Spain. Britton was the pick of Jersey's bowlers in their qualifier match against Guernsey, taking 3/11 in his two overs, as the islanders' secured a place in the group final where he took a further two wickets as they beat Belgium.

In June 2024, Britton made his T20I debut after being named in the Jersey squad for the three-match Inter-Insular Cup against Guernsey and then playing in the third game at Guernsey Rovers Athletic Club Ground, Port Soif, registering figures of 2/21 from his four overs.

On 7 September 2024, Britton took 1/34 from six overs as Jersey defeated Guernsey in the Inter-Insular Trophy one-day match.

He was included in the Jersey squad for the Cricket World Cup Challenge League A final round in Kenya in October 2026. Britton made his List A debut in their second match of the tournament against the hosts, Kenya, taking 1/38 off six overs in a 123-run win.
