= List of Jersey ODI cricketers =

International cricketers

This is a list of Jersey One-day International cricketers.

Jersey finished in first position in Group B of the 2019–2022 ICC Cricket World Cup Challenge League which earned them a place in the 2023 ICC Cricket World Cup Qualifier Play-off. The International Cricket Council announced that all the matches in the play-off would have One-Day International (ODI) status. Jersey therefore made their ODI debut against Canada on 27 March 2023.

This list comprises all members of the Jersey cricket team who have played at least one ODI match. It is initially arranged in the order in which each player won his first ODI cap. Where more than one player won his first ODI cap in the same match, their surnames are listed alphabetically.

== Key ==
General

- ‡ – Captain
- † – Wicket-keeper
- First – Year of debut
- Last – Year of latest game
- Mat – Number of matches played

Batting

- Runs – Runs scored in career
- HS – Highest score
- Avg – Runs scored per dismissal
- * – Batsman remained not out
- 50 – Half-centuries scored

Bowling

- Balls – Balls bowled in career
- Wkt – Wickets taken in career
- BBI – Best bowling in an innings
- Ave – Average runs per wicket

Fielding

- Ca – Catches taken
- St – Stumpings affected

== List of players ==
Statistics are correct as of 5 April 2023.

Jersey ODI cricketers
General					Batting					Bowling				Fielding		Ref
No.	Name	First	Last	Mat	Runs	HS	Avg	50	100	Balls	Wkt	BBI	Ave	Ca	St	Ref
1	Harrison Carlyon	2023	2023	5	143	85	28.60	1	0	180	2	2/38	70.50	0	0	
2	Jake Dunford†	2023	2023	5	10	4	2.50	0	0	–	–	–	–	2	0	
3	Nick Greenwood	2023	2023	5	94	59	18.80	1	0	–	–	–	–	4	0	
4	Anthony Hawkins-Kay	2023	2023	1	7	7	7.00	0	0	54	1	1/58	58.00	0	0	
5	Jonty Jenner	2023	2023	5	139	76	27.80	1	0	–	–	–	–	2	0	
6	Josh Lawrenson	2023	2023	5	243	114	48.60	1	1	–	–	–	–	1	0	
7	Elliot Miles	2023	2023	4	2	1*	2.00	0	0	174	4	2/32	41.25	0	0	
8	Charles Perchard‡	2023	2023	5	32	16*	32.00	0	0	270	9	3/38	23.11	0	0	
9	Julius Sumerauer	2023	2023	5	97	35	24.25	0	0	294	11	4/51	22.27	1	0	
10	Asa Tribe	2023	2023	5	237	115*	59.25	1	1	24	0	–	–	2	0	
11	Benjamin Ward	2023	2023	5	75	46	18.75	0	0	241	6	4/39	36.83	3	0	
12	Dominic Blampied	2023	2023	3	7	7	3.50	0	0	78	0	–	–	0	0	
13	Daniel Birrell	2023	2023	1	0	0	0.00	0	0	60	1	1/54	54.00	0	0	
14	Ben Stevens	2023	2023	1	1	1	1.00	0	0	18	0	–	–	0	0	
