= Patrick Gouge =

English/Jersey cricketer (born 2003)

Personal information
- Full name: Patrick Bartholomew Gouge
- Born: 3 February 2003 (age 23); Cambridge, Cambridgeshire, England
- Batting: Right-handed
- Bowling: Right-arm leg-break
- Role: Batsman/Wicket-keeper

International information
- National side: Jersey (2023–present)
- T20I debut (cap 21): 28 July 2023 v Denmark
- Last T20I: 23 May 2026 v Guernsey

Career statistics
| Competition | T20I | LA |
|---|---|---|
| Matches | 14 | 4 |
| Runs scored | 328 | 24 |
| Batting average | 36.44 | 8.00 |
| 100s/50s | 0/3 | 0/0 |
| Top score | 58 | 12 |
| Catches/stumpings | 10/2 | 2/– |
- Source: Cricinfo, 24 May 2026

Patrick Bartholomew Gouge (born 3 February 2003) is an English-born cricketer who plays for Jersey. He has also played for Durham University.

== Early life and education ==
Gouge was born 3 February 2003 in Cambridge, England.

He attended Durham University, where he studied geography.

== Career ==
Having previously represented Jersey at under-19s level and played for Durham University, Gouge made his senior international debut for the island against Denmark at the ICC Men's T20 World Cup Europe Qualifier tournament in Edinburgh, Scotland, on 28 July 2023.

On 2 September 2023, he made a score of 14 opening the batting as Jersey beat Guernsey by 173 runs in the Inter-Insular 50-over match.

Later that month, he was part of the Jersey squad which won their group to reach finals week at the T10 2023 European Cricket Championship in Málaga, Spain, hitting 50 in the island's match against Bulgaria.

Gouge scored his maiden T20I half-century in the first match of a double-header with Spain on 14 April 2024. Opening the batting, he hit 52 runs off 38 balls before continuing his good form into the second game of the event, held at La Manga, Cartagena, Spain, by bludgeoning 48 from just 27 deliveries.

He was among the 14-man squad named for the 2024–25 ICC Men's T20 World Cup Europe Qualifier to be held in Germany in July 2024. Gouge kept wicket in the opening match against Serbia and carried out his first international stumping.

Gouge was selected in the Jersey squad to face the Zimbabwe A Under-25 team in two one-day matches at New Farnley Cricket Club in Yorkshire, England, in August 2024. The following month he scored 17 off 12 balls as Jersey defeated Guernsey by two wickets in the 2024 Inter-Insular Trophy one-day match. Later in September he was named in Jersey's 14-player squad for the 2024 Cricket World Cup Challenge League A in Kenya and made his List A debut in the islanders' opening match against the hosts.

He was named in the Jersey squad for the 2025 Men's T20 World Cup Europe Regional Final in the Netherlands.

On 25 April 2026, playing for his club side, St Ouen Springfield in a 40 over Jersey Premier League match against RGA Walkovers, Gouge scored 207 from 121 balls including striking 18 4s and 12 6s.

Gouge was included in the Jersey squad for the 2026 Men's T20 World Cup Europe Sub-regional Qualifier A in Cyprus. Opening the batting during his team's first group stage match against Switzerland, he scored 33 not out off 19 balls, including hitting four 4s and one 6, in a nine-wicket win. In their third group match against France, Gouge made his second T20I half-century, compiling 54 from 34 balls, including striking three 4s and four 6s, as they won by eight-wickets. The next day, in their last group match against Croatia, he made 58 off 29 balls, an innings which featured four 4s and four 6s, and shared in a 142 run opening partnership with Harrison Carlyon, as Jersey secured a 109 run victory to clinch a place in the tournament final. Gouge scored 22 from 12 balls during Jersey's four-wicket win over Guernsey in the final.

On 15 July 2026, Gouge made 95 off 110 balls, including hitting 10 4s and two 6s, for Jersey in a 50 over match against Nepal at Grainville.
