= Dan Pascoe =

Australian cricketer

Personal information
- Full name: Daniel Charles Pascoe
- Born: 14 May 1983 (age 43); Canberra, Australian Capital Territory, Australia
- Batting: Right-handed
- Bowling: Slow left-arm orthodox

International information
- National side: Hong Kong

Domestic team information
- Years: Team
- 2009–2012: Oxford University
- 2010–2012: Oxford MCCU

Career statistics
Competition	First-class
Matches	8
Runs scored	229
Batting average	25.44
100s/50s	–/–
Top score	38
Balls bowled	1,637
Wickets	25
Bowling average	25.80
5 wickets in innings	2
10 wickets in match	–
Best bowling	6/68
Catches/stumpings	6/–
- Source: Cricinfo, 26 June 2020

Daniel Charles Pascoe (born 14 May 1983) is an Australian academic in law and former first-class cricketer.

== Early life and cricket career ==
Pascoe was born in Canberra in May 1983. He played age-group cricket for the Australian Capital Territory cricket team up to under-19 level. Pascoe studied law at the Australian National University, before going to England to study for his master's and doctorate at Lincoln College, University of Oxford.

Pascoe played first-class cricket for Oxford University, making his debut against Cambridge in The University Match in 2009. He featured for Oxford University in three further University Matches in 2010, 2011 and 2012. In addition to playing for the university, Pascoe also made four first-class appearances for Oxford MCCU between 2010 and 2012. (Note: Oxford MCCU differed from Oxford University Cricket Club in that it was open to students at Oxford Brookes University, whereas Oxford University Cricket Club is exclusively for students of the constituent colleges of the University of Oxford.) In eight first-class matches, Pascoe scored 229 runs at a batting average of 25.44, with a high score of 34. As a slow left-arm orthodox bowler, he took 25 wickets at a bowling average of 25.80. He twice took a five wicket haul, with his best figures of 6 for 68 coming for Oxford MCCU against Middlesex in 2010.

== Career in Hong Kong ==
After his studies, Pascoe became an academic lecturing in law. He is a visiting fellow at Fordham Law School and is an associate professor at City University of Hong Kong. Following his move to Hong Kong, Pascoe played club cricket for Kowloon Cricket Club. He was selected to play for Galaxy Gladiators Lantau, captained by Kumar Sangakkara, in the 2018 Hong Kong T20 Blitz, taking three wickets from his five matches played.

After completing a period of residency, Pascoe became eligible to represent the Hong Kong cricket team. In May 2022, he was named in Hong Kong's side for the 2022 Uganda Cricket World Cup Challenge League B tournament.

== Personal life ==
Pascoe is capable of speaking four languages, which being English, Indonesian, Spanish, and Mandarin Chinese.
