= Matthew Spoors =

Canadian cricketer

Personal information
- Born: 6 May 1999 (age 27); Melbourne, Victoria, Australia
- Height: 1.75 m (5 ft 9 in)
- Batting: Right-handed
- Bowling: Right-arm Leg break
- Role: All-rounder

International information
- National side: Canada (2022–present)
- ODI debut (cap 92): 27 March 2023 v Jersey
- Last ODI: 5 April 2023 v Papua New Guinea
- ODI shirt no.: 26
- T20I debut (cap 61): 18 February 2022 v Philippines
- Last T20I: 20 November 2022 v Oman
- T20I shirt no.: 7

Domestic team information
- Years: Team
- 2024/25–present: Western Australia (squad no. 22)
- 2024/25: Perth Scorchers (squad no. 7)
- 2025/26 –: Melbourne Renegades

Career statistics
Competition	ODI	T20I	LA	T20
Matches	5	10	11	15
Runs scored	86	269	186	347
Batting average	17.20	38.42	16.90	34.70
100s/50s	0/0	1/1	0/0	1/1
Top score	33	108*	33	108*
Balls bowled	–	12	–	48
Wickets	–	1	–	2
Bowling average	–	5.00	–	33.50
5 wickets in innings	–	0	–	0
10 wickets in match	–	0	–	0
Best bowling	–	1/5	–	1/5
Catches/stumpings	1/–	2/–	1/–	2/–
- Source: ESPNcricinfo, 20 April 2025

Matthew Spoors (born 6 May 1999) is a Canadian-Australian cricketer who played for the Canada national cricket team. He made his international debut for Canada in February 2022, and made the highest score in a Twenty20 International (T20I) match for a player on his debut.

== Career ==
Born in Australia to an Australian father and a Canadian mother, Spoors qualified to play for Canada as a dual citizen. He was awarded with a rookie contract with Western Australia ahead of the 2017/18 season whilst still finishing school at Hale School, and also represented the Australia national under-19 cricket team.

In February 2022, he was named in Canada's T20I squad for the 2022 ICC Men's T20 World Cup Global Qualifier A tournament in Oman. He made his T20I debut on 18 February 2022, against the Philippines. In the match, he scored an unbeaten 108, his first century in T20I cricket. It was the highest individual total made by a cricketer on T20I debut.

In July 2022, Spoors was named in Canada's squad for the 2022 Canada Cricket World Cup Challenge League A tournament. He made his List A debut on 27 July 2022, for Canada against Denmark.

In March 2023, he was named in Canada's squad for the 2023 Cricket World Cup Qualifier Play-off. He made his One Day International (ODI) debut on 27 March 2023, for Canada, against Jersey in that tournament.

On 13 November 2024, he made his List A debut for Western Australia in the 2023–24 Marsh One-Day Cup against Cricket Victoria at the Melbourne Cricket Ground . The following month, he made his Twenty20 Big Bash League debut for the Perth Scorchers in the 2024–25 Big Bash League season at Marvel Stadium on 23 December 2024, going on to play five matches during the season.

In July 2025, he also played in the Max60 Caribbean League, where he finished as the leading wicket-taker with 11 wickets in 6 games. He averaged 8.63 with the ball, maintained an economy rate of 7.91, and recorded best bowling figures of 5/13.
