= Jasraj Kundi =

Kenyan cricketer (born 1999)

Personal information
- Full name: Jasraj Singh Kundi
- Born: 6 July 1999 (age 27); Nairobi, Kenya
- Batting: Right-handed
- Bowling: Right-arm medium
- Role: All-rounder

International information
- National side: Kenya
- T20I debut (cap 30): 18 October 2019 v Netherlands
- Last T20I: 12 July 2024 v Nigeria
- Source: Cricinfo, 27 October 2019

Jasraj Kundi (born 6 July 1999) is a Kenyan cricketer. In September 2019, he was named in Kenya's squad for the 2019 ICC T20 World Cup Qualifier tournament in the United Arab Emirates. Prior to his selection for the 2019 T20 tournament, he was named in Kenya's squad for the 2018 Under-19 Cricket World Cup. He made his Twenty20 International (T20I) debut for Kenya, against the Netherlands, on 18 October 2019.
