= Eugene Ochieng =

Kenyan international cricketer (born 1993)

Personal information
- Full name: Eugene Odhiambo Ochieng
- Born: 18 February 1993 (age 33); Kiambu, Kenya
- Batting: Right-handed
- Bowling: Right-arm medium
- Role: All-rounder

International information
- National side: Kenya (2019–present)
- T20I debut (cap 28): 20 May 2019 v Nigeria
- Last T20I: 28 August 2022 v Nepal
- Source: ESPNCricinfo, 28 August 2022

Eugene Odhiambo Ochieng (born 18 February 1993) is a Kenyan international cricketer who made his debut for the Kenya national team in 2014. An allrounder, Ochieng bowls right-arm medium pace and bats right-handed.

Ochieng was born in Kiambu, in Kenya's Central Province. He made his debut for Kenya in November 2014, on a tour of Namibia that included matches against the Namibian national team. At the 2015 ICC Africa Twenty20 Division One tournament, Ochieng played in two of Kenya's matches, taking 2/10 against Tanzania but going wicketless against Namibia. Later in the year, he was selected in the Kenyan squad for the 2015 World Twenty20 Qualifier, the final qualification tournament for the 2016 World Twenty20. He appeared in two matches at the event, against the United Arab Emirates and the Netherlands, but had little impact in either.

In May 2019, he was named in Kenya's squad for the Regional Finals of the 2018–19 ICC T20 World Cup Africa Qualifier tournament in Uganda. He made his Twenty20 International (T20I) debut for Kenya against Nigeria on 20 May 2019. In October 2021, he was named in Kenya's squad for the Regional Final of the 2021 ICC Men's T20 World Cup Africa Qualifier tournament in Rwanda.

In June 2022, he featured in the Kenyan team for the 2022 Uganda Cricket World Cup Challenge League B tournament. He made his List A debut on 23 June 2022, against Italy.
