= Anthony Hawkins-Kay =

Jersey cricketer (born 1990)

Personal information
- Full name: Anthony Wilfrid Hawkins-Kay
- Born: 19 May 1990 (age 36); Jersey
- Batting: Right-handed
- Bowling: Right-arm fast-medium
- Role: All-rounder

International information
- National side: Jersey
- Only ODI (cap 4): 27 March 2023 v Canada
- T20I debut (cap 5): 31 May 2019 v Guernsey
- Last T20I: 27 October 2019 v Oman

Career statistics
Competition	ODI	T20I	LA	T20
Matches	1	16	9	22
Runs scored	7	122	67	149
Batting average	7.00	15.25	22.33	13.54
100s/50s	–/–	–/–	–/–	–/–
Top score	7	27*	38*	27*
Balls bowled	54	222	355	348
Wickets	1	15	11	22
Bowling average	58.00	17.93	25.54	18.31
5 wickets in innings	–	–	1	–
10 wickets in match	–	–	–	–
Best bowling	1/58	4/14	5/18	4/14
Catches/stumpings	–/–	7/–	2/–	8/–
- Source: ESPNcricinfo, 18 July 2023

Anthony Hawkins-Kay (born 19 May 1990) is a Jersey international cricketer. In 2014 he played in the 2014 ICC World Cricket League Division Four. He was selected in the Jersey squad for the 2015 ICC World Twenty20 Qualifier tournament and the 2016 ICC World Cricket League Division Four matches held in Los Angeles.

He was a member of Jersey's squad for the 2018 ICC World Cricket League Division Four tournament in Malaysia. In May 2019, he was named in Jersey's squad for the 2019 T20 Inter-Insular Cup against Guernsey. He made his Twenty20 International (T20I) debut for Jersey against Guernsey on 31 May 2019. The same month, he was named in Jersey's squad for the Regional Finals of the 2018–19 ICC T20 World Cup Europe Qualifier tournament in Guernsey. He finished the tournament as the joint-leading wicket-taker, with ten dismissals.

In September 2019, he was named in Jersey's squad for the 2019 ICC T20 World Cup Qualifier tournament in the United Arab Emirates. Ahead of the tournament, the International Cricket Council (ICC) named him as the key player in Jersey's squad. In June 2022, he was named in Jersey's squad for the 2022 Uganda Cricket World Cup Challenge League B tournament. He made his List A debut on 17 June 2022, against Uganda. Three days later, in Jersey's match against Kenya, he took his first five-wicket haul in List A cricket, with figures of 5/18.

In March 2023, he was named in Jersey's squad for the 2023 Cricket World Cup Qualifier Play-off. He made his One Day International (ODI) debut on 27 March 2023, for Jersey against Canada in that tournament.
