= Aman Gandhi (cricketer) =

Kenyan cricketer (born 2000)

Personal information
- Full name: Aman Rajesh Gandhi
- Born: 5 May 2000 (age 26); Nairobi, Kenya
- Batting: Right-handed
- Bowling: Right-arm off break
- Role: Batsman

International information
- National side: Kenya
- T20I debut (cap 32): 23 October 2019 v Singapore
- Last T20I: 27 October 2019 v PNG
- Source: Cricinfo, 27 October 2019

Aman Gandhi (born 5 May 2000) is a Kenyan cricketer. In September 2019, he was named in Kenya's squad for the 2019 ICC T20 World Cup Qualifier tournament in the United Arab Emirates. Before his selection for the 2019 T20 tournament, he was named in Kenya's squad for the 2018 Under-19 Cricket World Cup. He made his Twenty20 International (T20I) debut for Kenya against Singapore on 23 October 2019. In November 2019, he was named in Kenya's squad for the Cricket World Cup Challenge League B tournament in Oman.

Gandhi was born in Nairobi, Kenya, to parents of Indian ancestry.

In August 2022, he was named in Kenya's squad for the 2022 Jersey Cricket World Cup Challenge League B tournament. He made his List A debut on 5 August 2022, for Kenya against Hong Kong.
