= Imraz Raffi =

Sri Lankan cricketer (born 1992)

Personal information
- Full name: Mohamed Raffi Mohamed Imraz
- Born: 19 September 1992 (age 34); Colombo, Sri Lanka

International information
- National side: Qatar
- Source: Cricinfo, 20 November 2017

Imraz Raffi (born 19 September 1992) is a Sri Lankan-born cricketer who plays for the Qatar national cricket team. He made his first-class debut for Chilaw Marians Cricket Club in the 2011–12 Premier Trophy on 26 January 2012.

== See also ==
- List of Chilaw Marians Cricket Club players
