= Shangeev Thanikaithasan =

Danish cricketer (born 1998)

Personal information
- Born: 9 September 1998 (age 28); Horsens, Denmark
- Batting: Right-handed

International information
- National side: Denmark
- T20I debut (cap 25): 15 October 2021 v Italy
- Last T20I: 28 August 2024 v Guernsey
- T20I shirt no.: 78
- Source: Cricinfo, 28 August 2024

Shangeev Thanikaithasan (born 9 September 1998) is a Danish cricketer of Sri Lankan descent, who plays for Denmark's national cricket team. In April 2018, he was named in Denmark's squad for the 2018 ICC World Cricket League Division Four tournament in Malaysia. He played in Denmark's opening match of the tournament, against Bermuda.

In September 2018, he was named in Denmark's squad for the 2018 ICC World Cricket League Division Three tournament in Oman. In May 2019, he was named in Denmark's squad for a five-match series against Leinster Lightning in Ireland, in preparation for the Regional Finals of the 2018–19 ICC T20 World Cup Europe Qualifier tournament in Guernsey.

In October 2021, he was named in Denmark's Twenty20 International (T20I) squad for the Regional Final of the 2021 ICC Men's T20 World Cup Europe Qualifier tournament. He made his T20I debut on 15 October 2021, for Denmark against Italy.

In July 2022, Thanikaithasan was named in Denmark's squad for the 2022 Canada Cricket World Cup Challenge League A tournament. He made his List A debut on 27 July 2022, for Denmark against Canada.
