= Benjamin Ward (cricketer) =

Jersey cricketer (born 1998)

Personal information
- Full name: Benjamin Ward
- Born: 27 November 1998 (age 27)
- Batting: Right-handed
- Bowling: Right-arm legbreak
- Role: All-rounder

International information
- National side: Jersey
- ODI debut (cap 11): 27 March 2023 v Canada
- Last ODI: 30 March 2023 v Namibia
- T20I debut (cap 14): 15 June 2019 v Guernsey
- Last T20I: 23 May 2026 v Guernsey

Career statistics
Competition	ODI	T20I	LA
Matches	5	48	14
Runs scored	75	644	183
Batting average	18.75	25.76	16.63
100s/50s	0/0	0/1	0/0
Top score	46	58*	46
Balls bowled	241	1,027	637
Wickets	6	66	30
Bowling average	36.83	14.75	18.20
5 wickets in innings	0	0	2
10 wickets in match	0	0	0
Best bowling	4/39	4/6	5/28
Catches/stumpings	3/–	17/–	5/–
- Source: Cricinfo, 2 November 2026

Benjamin Ward (born 27 November 1998) is a Jersey international cricketer.

== Career ==
In May 2019, he was named in Jersey's squad for the Regional Finals of the 2018–19 ICC T20 World Cup Europe Qualifier tournament in Guernsey. He made his Twenty20 International (T20I) debut in the opening match of the competition on 15 June 2019 against the host nation Guernsey.

Ward was a member of Jersey's squad for the 2019 ICC T20 World Cup Qualifier tournament in the United Arab Emirates. He made his List A debut on 16 February 2020, for Boland in the 2019–20 CSA Provincial One-Day Challenge in South Africa.

In October 2021, Ward was named in Jersey's T20I squad for the Regional Final of the 2021 ICC Men's T20 World Cup Europe Qualifier tournament.

In March 2023, he was named in Jersey's squad for the 2023 Cricket World Cup Qualifier Play-off. He made his One Day International (ODI) debut on 27 March 2023, for Jersey against Canada in that tournament.

During the 2024–25 ICC Men's T20 World Cup Europe Qualifier in Germany in July 2024, Ward took four wickets for just six runs in the group stage match against Switzerland. Later in the event he bagged four wickets for 12 runs against Belgium. Ward took 3/9 in the final against Norway as Jersey won by six wickets. He was named man-of-the-match in the final and overall player of the tournament.

Ward was included in the Jersey squad for the 2025 Men's T20 World Cup Europe Regional Final in the Netherlands.

He was part of the Jersey squad for the 2026 Men's T20 World Cup Europe Sub-regional Qualifier A in Cyprus. During his team's first group stage match against Switzerland, Ward took 3/10 and was named man-of-the-match in a nine-wicket win.

On 5 September 2026, Ward took 2/24 and scored 82 not out as Jersey defeated Guernsey by five wickets in the annual 50-over Inter-Insular Trophy match at Grainville.

He claimed his first List A five-wicket haul in Jersey's 172-run win over Papua New Guinea in their opening match at the Cricket World Cup Challenge League A final round at the Gymkhana Club Ground in Nairobi, Kenya, on 22 October 2026, registering figures of 5/49 off his 10 overs. Three days later in their second match against the hosts, Kenya, he took 5/28 from nine overs in a 123-run win. Ward rounded off the event by taking 4/29 off five overs as Jersey defeated Qatar by 34 runs in their final contest which was shortened to 24 overs per side due to rain.
