= Saif Ahmad (cricketer) =

Danish cricketer (born 1998)

Personal information
- Full name: Saif Ali Ahmad
- Born: 11 April 1998 (age 28); Copenhagen, Denmark
- Batting: Left-handed
- Bowling: Right-arm offbreak

International information
- National side: Denmark
- T20I debut (cap 2): 16 June 2019 v Jersey
- Last T20I: 28 August 2024 v Guernsey
- T20I shirt no.: 77
- Source: Cricinfo, 28 August 2024

Saif Ahmad (born 11 April 1998) is a Danish cricketer, who plays for the national team. In April 2018, he was named in Denmark's squad for the 2018 ICC World Cricket League Division Four tournament in Malaysia. He played in Denmark's opening match of the tournament, against Bermuda. He was the leading wicket-taker for Denmark in the tournament, with ten dismissals in five matches.

In September 2018, Ahmad was named in Denmark's squad for the 2018 ICC World Cricket League Division Three tournament in Oman. He was again Denmark's leading wicket-taker in the tournament, with eleven dismissals in five matches.

In May 2019, he was named in Denmark's squad for the Regional Finals of the 2018–19 ICC T20 World Cup Europe Qualifier tournament in Guernsey. He made his Twenty20 International (T20I) debut for Denmark, against Jersey, on 16 June 2019. In October 2021, he was named in Denmark's T20I squad for the Regional Final of the 2021 ICC Men's T20 World Cup Europe Qualifier tournament.

In July 2022, Ahmad was named in Denmark's squad for the 2022 Canada Cricket World Cup Challenge League A tournament. He made his List A debut on 27 July 2022, for Denmark against Canada.
