= Josh Lawrenson =

Jersey cricketer (born 2002)

Personal information
- Full name: Joshua Anthony David Lawrenson
- Born: 20 November 2002 (age 23)
- Batting: Right-handed
- Bowling: Right-arm offbreak

International information
- National side: Jersey
- ODI debut (cap 6): 27 March 2023 v Canada
- Last ODI: 1 April 2023 v Papua New Guinea
- T20I debut (cap 20): 7 July 2023 v Germany
- Last T20I: 23 June 2024 v Guernsey

Career statistics
| Competition | ODI | T20I | LA |
|---|---|---|---|
| Matches | 5 | 12 | 31 |
| Runs scored | 243 | 103 | 1,281 |
| Batting average | 48.60 | 17.16 | 44.17 |
| 100s/50s | 1/1 | –/– | 3/7 |
| Top score | 114 | 36 | 139 |
| Balls bowled | – | – | 593 |
| Wickets | – | – | 24 |
| Bowling average | – | – | 16.45 |
| 5 wickets in innings | – | – | 1 |
| 10 wickets in match | – | – | 0 |
| Best bowling | – | – | 5/29 |
| Catches/stumpings | 1/– | 5/– | 12/– |
- Source: Cricinfo, 2 November 2026

Joshua Anthony David Lawrenson (born 20 November 2002) is a cricketer who plays for Jersey. He was the first player to score a One Day International century for the country.

== Career ==
In November 2019, Lawrenson was named in Jersey's squad for the Cricket World Cup Challenge League B tournament in Oman. He made his List A debut, for Jersey against Italy, on 6 December 2019.

In June 2022, he was named in Jersey's squad for the 2022 Uganda Cricket World Cup Challenge League B tournament. On 21 June 2022, in Jersey's match against Italy, Lawrenson scored his first century in List A cricket, with 102 not out.

Lawrenson was a member of Jersey's squad for the 2023 Cricket World Cup Qualifier Play-off. He made his One Day International (ODI) debut on 27 March 2023, for Jersey against Canada in that tournament. On 1 April 2023, he became the first player to score an ODI century for Jersey, making 114 as his side recorded their maiden win in the format, beating Papua New Guinea by 11 runs.

In September 2024, Lawrenson was named in Jersey's 14-player squad for the 2024 Cricket World Cup Challenge League A in Kenya. In the islanders' fourth match at the tournament, he took his first five-wicket haul in List A cricket with 5/29 in their win over Kuwait. Lawrenson top scored with 93 off 119 balls to claim player of the match honours in Jersey's final contest of the tournament against Denmark.

During the 2025 Cricket World Cup Challenge League A, which was held in Jersey in August 2025, Lawrenson played a starring role for his team, taking identical figures of 4/25 in their wins over Kenya and Papua New Guinea as well as scoring 139 runs off 152 balls as they defeated Denmark.

In October 2026, Lawrenson scored 72 off 95 balls in Jersey's 172-run win over Papua New Guinea in their opening match at the Cricket World Cup Challenge League A final round in Nairobi, Kenya. He followed this up with 81 from 97 balls as the islanders defeated Denmark by 72 runs in their fourth match of the tournament. Lawrenson rounded off the event by scoring 40 from 27 balls as Jersey defeated Qatar by 34 runs in their final match which was shortened to 24 overs per side due to rain. He was subsequently voted player of the tournament.
