= Daniel Birrell =

Jersey cricketer (born 2000)

Personal information
- Born: 4 April 2000 (age 26)
- Batting: Right-handed
- Bowling: Right-arm medium
- Role: Bowler

International information
- National side: Jersey
- Only ODI (cap 13): 5 April 2023 v United Arab Emirates
- T20I debut (cap 18): 17 October 2021 v Denmark
- Last T20I: 19 May 2026 v France

Career statistics
Competition	ODI	T20I	LA
Matches	1	17	8
Runs scored	0	14	14
Batting average	0	7.00	4.66
100s/50s	0/0	0/0	–/–
Top score	0	6*	6*
Balls bowled	60	334	252
Wickets	1	21	9
Bowling average	54.00	18.28	24.77
5 wickets in innings	0	0	0
10 wickets in match	0	9	0
Best bowling	1/54	3/19	4/20
Catches/stumpings	0/–	9/–	1/–
- Source: ESPNcricinfo, 25 May 2026

Daniel Birrell (born 4 April 2000) is a cricketer who plays for Jersey. In November 2019, he was named in Jersey's squad for the Cricket World Cup Challenge League B tournament in Oman. He made his List A debut, for Jersey against Bermuda, on 11 December 2019.

In October 2021, Birrell was named in Jersey's Twenty20 International (T20I) squad for the Regional Final of the 2021 ICC Men's T20 World Cup Europe Qualifier tournament. He made his T20I debut on 17 October 2021, for Jersey against Denmark.

He was a member of Jersey's squad for the 2023 Cricket World Cup Qualifier Play-off. He made his One Day International (ODI) debut for Jersey on 5 April 2023, against the United Arab Emirates.

In September 2024 he was named in Jersey's 14-player squad for the 2024 Cricket World Cup Challenge League A in Kenya.
