= Zak Tribe =

Jersey cricketer (born 2001)

Personal information
- Full name: Zak Mark Tribe
- Born: 16 August 2001 (age 25)
- Batting: Right-handed
- Bowling: Right-arm Leg spin
- Role: Batsman

International information
- National side: Jersey (2021–present)
- T20I debut (cap 17): 15 October 2021 v Germany
- Last T20I: 23 May 2026 v Guernsey

Career statistics
Competition	T20I	LA
Matches	32	15
Runs scored	464	662
Batting average	21.09	66.20
100s/50s	0/1	2/4
Top score	54*	150
Balls bowled	108	150
Wickets	10	9
Bowling average	9.00	14.11
5 wickets in innings	0	0
10 wickets in match	0	0
Best bowling	3/13	4/16
Catches/stumpings	11/–	6/–
- Source: Cricinfo, 2 November 2026

Zak Tribe (born 16 August 2001) is a cricketer who plays for Jersey.

== Career ==
Having made his international debut for Jersey in 2021, Tribe made his maiden List A century for the islanders' in their Cricket World Cup Challenge League match against Qatar at the Gymkhana Club Ground in Nairobi, Kenya, on 26 September 2024, scoring exactly 100 off 81 balls in a 168-run win.

On 23 May 2026, he compiled a man-of-the-match winning 54 not out from 40 balls, including hitting five 6s, against Guernsey in the final of the T20 World Cup Europe Sub-regional Qualifier A in Cyprus as he led Jersey's recovery from 61 for 5 to successfully chase a target of 140 with two overs to spare.

Tribe made his second List A century in Jersey's 172-run win over Papua New Guinea in their opening match at the Cricket World Cup Challenge League A final round at the Gymkhana Club Ground in Nairobi, Kenya, on 22 October 2026, scoring 150 off 129 balls in an innings which featured 11 4s and five 6s. In their second match against the hosts, Kenya, he made 65 from 67 balls and took his first two List A wickets in a 123-run win. Against Qatar in their final match of the event, Tribe delivered an all-round performance scoring 53 off 42 balls and then taking 4/16 from three overs as Jersey won by 34 runs in a contest which was shortened to 24 overs per side due to rain. Having compiled 289 runs across his team's five matches, he was voted batter of the tournament.

== Personal life ==
Tribe is the older brother of professional cricketer Asa Tribe. He is a graduate of Nottingham Trent University.
