= 2023 European Cricket Championship =

Cricket tournament held in Spain

- Administrator: International Cricket Council
- Cricket format: 10-over
- Tournament format: Round-robin
- Host: Spain
- Champions: England
- Participants: 31
- Matches: 109
- Official website: European Cricket Championship

The 2023 European Cricket Championship was a cricket tournament that took place from September 25 to October 20, 2023. It was at the Cártama Oval in Málaga, Spain, and featured a record 31 national teams, who played a total of 108 (Note: 109 planned; however Italy vs. Jersey was abandoned without a ball being bowled during championship week.) total games under the T10 format. England XI, made up of players from the National Counties Cricket Association, won the tournament, defeating defending champions Netherlands XI by eight wickets in the final.

== Teams ==
The following 31 national teams took part in the competition:

Bye to Championship Week	Group A	Group B	Group C	Group D	Group E	Group F
Netherlands XI	Spain	Jersey	Italy	Ireland XI	England XI	Scotland XI
	Isle of Man	Guernsey	Denmark	Austria	Switzerland	Germany
	Czech Republic	Belgium	Sweden	Finland	Romania	Portugal
	France	Bulgaria	Serbia	Hungary	Malta	Norway
	Greece	Croatia	Estonia	Turkey	Cyprus	Luxembourg

== Format ==
30 of the 31 teams were divided into six groups of five. After a round-robin stage, the top four teams in each group played a knockout round using the Page playoff system. The six group winners were joined by the 2022 winners, the Netherlands, in the Championship Week, which culminated with the final, on October 20.

== Squads ==
Teams were able to submit rosters of up to 15 players. The 4 countries with ODI status (England, Scotland, Ireland and Netherlands) participated with their "XI" squads, instead of their premier or "A" players.

== Group stage ==
The Group Stage is played across the first 3 weeks of the tournament, with each group lasting 3 days.

=== Group A ===
==== Round robin ====
Pos	Team	Pld	W	L	NR	Pts	NRR
1	Spain	4	4	0	0	8	4.040
2	France	4	3	1	0	6	5.541
3	Isle of Man	4	2	2	0	4	−2.027
4	Greece	4	1	3	0	2	−2.581
5	Czech Republic	4	0	4	0	0	−3.867

Source: European Cricket Network
- advance to the Qualifier
- advance to the Eliminator

==== Knockout rounds ====
Qualifier 1 and Eliminator
27 September 2023
1	Spain	147/7 (8.5 overs)
2	France	146/5 (10 overs)
27 September 2023
3	Isle of Man	90/8 (10 overs)
4	Greece	91/5 (9.2 overs)

Qualifier 2
27 September 2023
2	France	189/5 (10 overs)
4	Greece	118/7 (10 overs)

Final
27 September 2023
1	Spain	98/3 (7.5 overs)
2	France	97/8 (10 overs)

=== Group B ===
==== Round robin ====
Pos	Team	Pld	W	L	NR	Pts	NRR
1	Jersey	4	4	0	0	8	8.555
2	Guernsey	4	3	1	0	6	2.902
3	Belgium	4	2	2	0	4	3.832
4	Bulgaria	4	1	3	0	2	−6.162
5	Croatia	4	0	4	0	0	−8.681

Source: European Cricket Network
- advance to the Qualifier
- advance to the Eliminator

==== Knockout rounds ====
Qualifier 1 and Eliminator
30 September 2023
1	Jersey	164/4 (10 overs)
2	Guernsey	126/8 (10 overs)
30 September 2023
3	Belgium	202/2 (10 overs)
4	Bulgaria	69/4 (10 overs)

Qualifier 2
30 September 2023
2	Guernsey	124/1 (10 overs)
3	Belgium	167/3 (10 overs)

Final
30 September 2023
1	Jersey	111/2 (6.4 overs)
3	Belgium	105/9 (10 overs)

=== Group C ===
==== Round robin ====
Pos	Team	Pld	W	L	NR	Pts	NRR
1	Italy	4	3	1	0	6	4.967
2	Denmark	4	3	1	0	6	4.592
3	Sweden	4	3	1	0	6	3.107
4	Estonia	4	1	3	0	2	−3.879
5	Serbia	4	0	4	0	0	−8.683

Source: European Cricket Network
- advance to the Qualifier
- advance to the Eliminator

==== Knockout rounds ====
Qualifier 1 and Eliminator
4 October 2023
1	Italy	132/8 (10 overs)
2	Denmark	128/6 (10 overs)
4 October 2023
3	Sweden	97/1 (5.4 overs)
4	Estonia	94/6 (10 overs)

Qualifier 2
4 October 2023
2	Denmark	122/5 (9.2 overs)
3	Sweden	119/4 (10 overs)

Final
4 October 2023
1	Italy	112/4 (7.4 overs)
2	Denmark	110/8 (10 overs)

=== Group D ===
==== Round robin ====
Pos	Team	Pld	W	L	NR	Pts	NRR
1	Ireland XI	4	4	0	0	8	7.975
2	Hungary	4	3	1	0	6	4.587
3	Austria	4	2	2	0	4	0.687
4	Finland	4	1	3	0	2	−3.800
5	Turkey	4	0	4	0	0	−9.167

Source: European Cricket Network
- advance to the Qualifier
- advance to the Eliminator

==== Knockout rounds ====
Qualifier 1 and Eliminator
7 October 2023
1	Ireland XI	168/2 (10 overs)
2	Hungary	114/7 (10 overs)
7 October 2023
3	Austria	100/6 (10 overs)
4	Finland	104/1 (6.2 overs)

Qualifier 2
7 October 2023
2	Hungary	138/5 (10 overs)
4	Finland	125/5 (10 overs)

Final
7 October 2023
1	Ireland XI	138/2 (8.4 overs)
2	Hungary	137/3 (10 overs)

=== Group E ===
==== Round robin ====
Pos	Team	Pld	W	L	NR	Pts	NRR
1	England XI	4	4	0	0	8	4.676
2	Switzerland	4	3	1	0	6	1.689
3	Romania	4	2	2	0	4	0.402
4	Malta	4	1	3	0	2	−1.137
5	Cyprus	4	0	4	0	0	−5.364

Source: European Cricket Network
- advance to the Qualifier
- advance to the Eliminator

==== Knockout rounds ====
Qualifier 1 and Eliminator
11 October 2023
1	England XI	110/9 (10 overs)
2	Switzerland	111/2 (6.4 overs)
11 October 2023
3	Romania	115/8 (10 overs)
4	Malta	134 (9.5 overs)

Qualifier 2
11 October 2023
1	England XI	109/2 (6.2 overs)
4	Malta	107/6 (10 overs)

Final
11 October 2023
2	Switzerland	75/8 (10 overs)
1	England XI	138/5 (10 overs)

=== Group F ===
==== Round robin ====
Pos	Team	Pld	W	L	NR	Pts	NRR
1	Germany	4	4	0	0	8	4.015
2	Portugal	4	3	1	0	6	1.114
3	Norway	4	2	2	0	4	0.907
4	Scotland XI	4	1	3	0	2	−1.638
5	Luxembourg	4	0	4	0	0	−4.208

Source: European Cricket Network
- advance to the Qualifier
- advance to the Eliminator

==== Knockout rounds ====
Qualifier 1 and Eliminator
14 October 2023
1	Germany	169/2 (10 overs)
2	Portugal	123 (8.3 overs)
14 October 2023
3	Norway	144/5 (10 overs)
4	Scotland XI	146/1 (10 overs)

Qualifier 2
14 October 2023
2	Portugal	103/9 (10 overs)
4	Scotland XI	108/4 (6.5 overs)

Final
14 October 2023
1	Germany	115/3 (8.3 overs)
4	Scotland XI	113/7 (10 overs)

== Championship Week ==
The Championship Week featured the 2022 champions, the Netherlands, as well as the six group winners. It was contested between October 16 and October 20. The top four teams advanced to the knockout rounds with the final played on October 20, 2023.

=== Round robin ===
Pos	Team	Pld	W	L	NR	Pts	NRR
1	England XI	6	4	2	0	8	4.223
2	Netherlands XI	6	4	2	0	8	0.802
3	Spain	6	4	2	0	8	0.362
4	Ireland XI	6	3	3	0	6	0.866
5	Germany	6	3	3	0	6	−1.697
6	Jersey	6	1	4	1	3	−2.685
7	Italy	6	1	4	1	3	−3.179

Source: European Cricket Network
- advance to the Qualifier
- advance to the Eliminator

=== Knockout rounds ===
Qualifier 1 and Eliminator
20 October 2023
1	England XI	158/6 (10 overs)
2	Netherlands XI	143/6 (10 overs)
20 October 2023
3	Spain	143/3 (8.5 overs)
4	Ireland XI	139/6 (10 overs)

Qualifier 2
20 October 2023
2	Netherlands XI	185/4 (9.5 overs)
3	Spain	182/4 (10 overs)

Final
20 October 2023
1	England XI	146/2 (8.1 overs)
2	Netherlands XI	145/3 (10 overs)

== Broadcasting ==
European Cricket announced the following list of broadcasters for the 2023 tournament. In countries with no broadcaster listed below, all games were available live on YouTube.

Region(s)	Broadcaster(s)
India	FanCode
Australia	Fox Sports
Austria	Streamster
(Cricket West Indies) West Indies	Sports Max
United States; Canada	Willow TV
Germany	Sport Deutschland
Switzerland	Swiss Sport TV
Sub-Saharan Africa	StarTimes
(Saudi Arabia) Saudi Arabia; Middle East; North Africa	SSC
United Kingdom (Republic of Ireland) Ireland	Viaplay
France	Sport en France
(Spain) Spain; South America	LaLiga+
Turkey	sportstv
