= 2014 Europe Twenty20 Division Two =

2014 ICC Europe Division Two
- Dates: 23 – 26 June 2014
- Administrator: ICC Europe
- Cricket format: 20-over
- Tournament format: Round-robin
- Host: England
- Champions: Norway
- Participants: 6
- Matches: 15
- Most runs: (Norway) Ehtsham Ul-Haq (170)
- Most wickets: (Norway) Safir Hayat (10)

The 2014 ICC Europe Division Two was an international 20-over cricket tournament hosted in Essex, England, from 23 to 26 June 2014. The first round of matches were held at the County Cricket Ground, Chelmsford, while all other games were split between Garon Park, Southend-on-Sea, and the Toby Howe Cricket Ground, Billericay.

The tournament was contested by six teams, Austria, Belgium, Germany, Gibraltar, the Isle of Man, and Norway. The teams played each other once in a round-robin, with Norway finishing undefeated from their five matches to gain promotion to the 2015 ICC Europe Division One tournament. Belgium were the runner-up, while Germany were winless. Two Norwegian players, Ehtsham Ul-Haq and Safir Hayat, led the tournament in runs and wickets, respectively.

== Squads ==
Austria	Belgium	Germany
Amir Naeem (c); Munir Ahmed; Kasthuri Arachchige; Imran Asif; Imran Goraya; Satish Kaul; Shadran Khan; Benji Loader; Aamir Malik; Babar Nadeem; Tiran Perera; Armaan Randhawa; Nandeep Soggi; Mohammad Zalmai	Brighton Watambwa (c); Reyhan Faiz; Jamie Farmiloe; Soheel Hussain; Syed Jamil; Faisal Khaliq; Shaival Mehta; Fahim Muhammad; Shahid Muhammad; Simon Newport; Abdul Rehman; Waqas Shafiq; Sheraz Sheikh	Rishi Pillai (c); Adeeb Asgher; Khalid Butt; Imran Chaudhry; Wasantha De Silva; Shakeel Hassan; Javed Iqbal; Bilal Jafar; Khaled Khan; André Leslie; Hamid Mahmood; Zadran Nasrullah; Harmanjot Singh; Satyanarayana Srinivas
Gibraltar	Isle of Man	Norway
Iain Latin (c); Mark Bacarese; Scott Chipolina; Ian Clark; Richard Colyer; David Coram; Ian Farrell; Julian Freyone; Kieron Ferrary; Marc Gouws; Matthew Hunter; Vikram Khatwani; Balaji Pai; Kayron Stagno	Philip Littlejohns (c); Christopher Hawke; Gregory Hawke; Sam Kebbell; Adam Killey; Daniel Kniveton; Luke Lacey; Gareth Morris; Adam McAuley; Alexander Stokoe; Max Stokoe; Arnie van den Berg; Oliver Webster; Mathys Wessels	Zaheer Ashiq (c); Prithvi Bhart; Shahbaz Butt; Damon Crawford; Safir Hayat; Suhail Iftikhar; Ansar Iqbal; Shehraz Khalid; Fazil Mir; Babar Shahzad; Sufyan Saleem; Wasim Tahir; Ehtsham Ul-Haq; Shahzad Umran

== Points table ==
Qualified for 2015 Division One

Team	Pld	W	L	T	NR	Pts	NRR
Norway	5	5	0	0	0	10	+0.938
Belgium	5	4	1	0	0	8	+0.655
Austria	5	3	2	0	0	6	+0.600
Gibraltar	5	2	3	0	0	4	–0.330
Isle of Man	5	1	4	0	0	2	–1.273
Germany	5	0	5	0	0	0	–0.735

Source: CricketArchive

== Matches ==
23 June
Scorecard

Gibraltar; 148/7 (20 overs)	v	Belgium; 154/7 (19.3 overs)

Belgium won by 3 wickets
County Cricket Ground, Chelmsford

23 June
Scorecard

Germany; 109/8 (20 overs)	v	Austria; 110/9 (19.4 overs)

Austria won by 1 wicket
County Cricket Ground, Chelmsford

23 June
Scorecard

Isle of Man; 116 (19 overs)	v	Belgium; 117/4 (19.2 overs)

Norway won by 6 wickets
County Cricket Ground, Chelmsford

24 June
Scorecard

Gibraltar; 104 (19.2 overs)	v	Austria; 105/4 (17.1 overs)

Austria won by 6 wickets
Garon Park, Southend-on-Sea

24 June
Scorecard

Belgium; 127 (19.4 overs)	v	Norway; 129/2 (18.4 overs)

Norway won by 8 wickets
Toby Howe Cricket Ground, Billericay

24 June
Scorecard

Isle of Man; 132/5 (20 overs)	v	Germany; 120 (19.5 overs)

Isle of Man won by 12 runs
Toby Howe Cricket Ground, Billericay

24 June
Scorecard

Austria; 101/9 (20 overs)	v	Norway; 103/3 (19.2 overs)

Norway won by 7 wickets
Toby Howe Cricket Ground, Billericay

24 June
Scorecard

Belgium; 186/4 (20 overs)	v	Isle of Man; 140/9 (20 overs)

Belgium won by 46 runs
Toby Howe Cricket Ground, Billericay

24 June
Scorecard

Germany; 133/6 (20 overs)	v	Gibraltar; 134/4 (18 overs)

Gibraltar won by 6 wickets
Garon Park, Southend-on-Sea

26 June
Scorecard

Isle of Man; 80 (17.3 overs)	v	Austria; 81/0 (10.3 overs)

Austria won by 10 wickets
Garon Park, Southend-on-Sea

26 June
Scorecard

Belgium; 126/9 (20 overs)	v	Germany; 122 (19.5 overs)

Belgium won by 4 runs
Toby Howe Cricket Ground, Billericay

26 June
Scorecard

Gibraltar; 113/9 (20 overs)	v	Norway; 116/1 (15.4 overs)

Norway won by 9 wickets
Toby Howe Cricket Ground, Billericay

26 June
Scorecard

Austria; 122/8 (20 overs)	v	Belgium; 124/5 (18 overs)

Belgium won by 6 wickets
Garon Park, Southend-on-Sea

26 June
Scorecard

Germany; 110 (19.4 overs)	v	Norway; 111/2 (14.1 overs)

Norway won by 8 wickets
Toby Howe Cricket Ground, Billericay

26 June
Scorecard

Isle of Man; 134/7 (20 overs)	v	Gibraltar; 139/3 (18 overs)

Gibraltar won by 7 wickets
Toby Howe Cricket Ground, Billericay

== Statistics ==
=== Most runs ===
The top five run scorers (total runs) are included in this table.

Player	Team	Runs	Inns	Avg	S/R	Highest	100s	50s
Ehtsham Ul-Haq	Norway	170	5	85.00	95.50	54*	0	2
Kayron Stagno	Gibraltar	165	5	55.00	125.95	74*	0	1
Shahbaz Butt	Norway	154	5	77.00	90.05	47	0	0
Mark Bacarese	Gibraltar	146	5	29.20	99.31	59	0	1
Syed Jamil	Belgium	125	4	31.25	96.89	55	0	1

Source: CricketArchive

=== Most wickets ===
The top five wicket takers are listed in this table, listed by wickets taken and then by bowling average.

Player	Team	Overs	Wkts	Ave	SR	Econ	BBI
Safir Hayat	Norway	15.4	10	11.10	9.40	7.08	4/13
Luke Lacey	Isle of Man	15.2	9	13.00	10.22	7.63	6/34
Shahzad Umran	Norway	19.0	8	9.62	14.25	4.05	2/11
Munir Ahmed	Austria	18.0	8	10.50	13.50	4.66	3/7
Hamid Mahmood	Germany	18.1	8	12.50	13.62	5.50	3/21

Source: CricketArchive
