= 2011 Europe Twenty20 Division Two =

2011 ICC European T20 Championship Division Two
- Administrator: International Cricket Council
- Cricket format: Twenty20
- Tournament format: Round-robin
- Host(s): Belgium and Netherlands
- Champions: Belgium (1st title)
- Participants: 11
- Matches: 36
- Most runs: (Isle of Man) Gareth Morris
- Most wickets: (Malta) Andrew Naudi
- Official website: ICC European Championship

The 2011 ICC European Twenty20 Championship Division Two is a cricket tournament that took place between 20 and 25 June 2011. It forms part of the European Cricket Championship. Belgium and the Netherlands hosted the event.

== Teams ==
Teams that qualified are as follows:

=== Group A ===
- Cyprus
- Finland
- Isle of Man
- Luxembourg
- Portugal

=== Group B ===
- Austria
- Belgium
- Greece
- Malta
- Spain
- Sweden

== Squads ==
Austria	Belgium	Cyprus	Finland
Amar Naeem (c) and (wk); Muhammad Akhtar; Imran Asif; Syed Qamar; Erwin Grasinger; Lakmal Kasturiarachchige; Satish Kaul; Benji Loader; Tiran Indika Perera; Wasif Saluja; Aman Deep; Simpson-Parker; Nandeep Soggi; Satyam Subhash; Q Abbas	Andre Wagener (c); Shaheryar Butt; Jamie Farmiloe; Javed Iqbal; Aamir Iqbal; Nadeem Khan; Faisal Khaliq; Shaival Mehta; Sunny Sheikh; Shahid Muhammad; Simon Newport; Ali Raza (wk); Abdul Rehman; Nirvam Shah; Shahzad Jillani; Akshat Sanghvi; Sebastien Shukla; W Shafiq; Charles Wright	Michalis Kyriacou (c); Dhanuka Agathocleous; Dineja Agathocleous (wk); Babar Ayub; Alan Broadbent; Nimal Durayalage; Syed Hussain; Stelios Michaelides; Andrew Mulkern; Yasir Nazir; George Papaonisiforou; Niroshan Pelawattha; Malik Tariq; Mohamedriyaz Kajalwala; Muhammad Khan; Christos Markides; Sakhawat Rubel; Sampath Tsangarides	Jonathan Scamans (c); Madhu Bhandari; Amrik Bhatia; Shakil Islam; Zakiullah Kamal; Zahidullah Kamal; Ekhpelwak Kuchey; Shidhu Kanade; Bilal Khan; Obaidullah Sadiqui; Michael Shaw (wk); Roholah Sadiqui; Muhammad Tariq Sarfraz; Shabir Sheerzad

Greece	Isle of Man	Luxembourg	Malta
Mehmood Ahmed; Stamatios Giourgas; Spyridon Goustis; Oliver Hutton; Athanasios Karakantas; Iordanis Kontarinis; Spyridon Kontos; Andreas Koutsoufis; Anastasios Manousis; Christos Molinaris (wk); Stavros Nikitaras (c); Georgios Stogiannos; Georgios Toulantas; Dimitrios Triantafillidis; Alexis Souvlakis	Sebastian Aycock; Ross Berry; Daniel Hawke; Christopher Hawke; Jaco Jansen; Daniel Kniveton; Richard Kniveton (c) (wk); Shaun Kelly; Peter Lewis; Gareth Morris; Garreth Roome; Max Stokoe; Arnie van den Berg; Oliver Webster	William Heath (c); Timothy Andrews; Timothy Barker; James Barker; Wayne Codd; Graham Cope (wk); Taral Desai; Sebastian Finch; Nishith Gandhi; Deepak Gianchandani; Piran Merkl; Joost Mees; Anand Pattabiraman; Tony Whiteman; Saravanan Narayanan	Andrew Lenard (c); Samuel Aquilina; Justin Brooke; Michael Caruana; Malcolm Crabbe; Balakrishnan Dhandapani; Ghose Roy; John Grima (wk); Darren Grech; Nowell Khosla; Andrew Naudi; Mark George Sacco; Ronald Sacco; Anthony Slater; Sarfraz Ali; David Borg Known As Newton; Robert Krishna; Javeed Shah; Frankie Spiteri

Portugal	Spain	Sweden
Akbar Saiyad (c); Zafar Ali; Paulo Buccimazza; Syed Bukhari; Nadeem Butt; Abu Butt; Shahzad Hassan; Khalid Izaz; Rizwan Khaliq (wk); Babar Khan; Intesab Medhi; Muhammad Mirza; Nadeem Nazar; Muhammad Shoaib; Ricardo Antunes; Carlo Buccimazza; Silkesh Deuchande; Jose Ricardo Pais	Sajad Ali; Shafique Ali; Gary Crompton; Mohib Hussein; Tanveer Iqbal; Muhammad Irshad Khan; Armaghan Khan; Farhat Mahmood; James Morgan (c) (wk); Christian Munoz-Mills; Talat Ali; Mark Spencer; Wasim Ur Rehman Khan; Venus Valiente; Faran Afzal; Mohammad Akmal; Shoaib Hussein; Gurmeet Singh	Piyal Rahman (c); Imran Amjad; Usman Azim; Sanaullah Habibzai; Azam Khalil; Maqsood Khawaja; Azam Mohammad; Ewan Prezens; Sunny Sharma; Sadat Sidiqi (wk); Christopher Tebbutt; Aman Zahid; Bilal Zaigham; Hassan Zaigham; Adnan Raza; Sandeep Sharma; Noman Zahid

== Fixtures ==
=== Group stage ===
==== Group A ====
Team	P	W	L	T	NR	Points	NRR
Isle of Man	4	4	0	0	0	8	+4.480
Portugal	4	2	1	0	1	5	+0.446
Finland	4	2	1	0	1	5	–0.308
Luxembourg	4	1	3	0	0	2	–1.638
Cyprus	4	0	4	0	0	0	–3.567

20 June
10.30 a.m.
Scorecard

Cyprus; 134/9 (20 overs)	v	Finland; 135/2 (17.2 overs)
Nimal Durayalage 24 (19); Ekhpelwak Kuchey 3/23 (3 overs)		Jonathan Scamans 47* (33); Syed Hussain 2/24 (3 overs)

Finland won by 8 wickets
Gent CC, Ghent
Umpires: Richard Eames (Bel) and Lee Goldsmith (Ire)

- Finland won the toss and elected to field.

20 June
3.30 p.m.
Scorecard

Isle of Man; 200/3 (20 overs)	v	Luxembourg; 58/9 (18 overs)
Gareth Morris 95 (42); James Barker 2/32 (4 overs)		William Heath 18 (31); Arnie van den Berg 4/7 (4 overs)

Isle of Man won by 125 runs (D/L)
Arcadians Cricket Club Ground, Ghent
Umpires: Ron Graham (Esp) and Bart Hartong (Ned)

- Isle of Man won the toss and elected to bat.

21 June
10.30 a.m.
Scorecard

Isle of Man; 224/4 (20 overs)	v	Cyprus; 74 (17.1 overs)
Gareth Morris 141* (62); Syed Hussain 3/30 (4 overs)		Dineja Agothocleous 19* (25); Arnie van den Berg 4/15 (4 overs)

Isle of Man won by 150 runs
Arcadians Cricket Club Ground, Ghent

- Isle of Man won the toss and elected to bat.

21 June
10.30 a.m.
Scorecard

Portugal; 139/3 (20 overs)	v	Luxembourg; 145/5 (19.2 overs)
Taral Desai 59* (34); Nadeem Nazar 1/18 (2 overs)		Zafar Ali 41* (18); Piran Merkl 2/19 (4 overs)

Portugal won by 5 wickets
Royal Brussels Cricket Club Ground, Waterloo
Umpires: John Andrews (Ire) and Lee Goldsmith (Ire)

- Portugal won the toss and elected to field.

21 June
3.30 p.m.
Scorecard

Finland; 87 (17.2 overs)	v	Isle of Man; 88/1 (12.5 overs)
Bilal Khan 26 (22); Ross Berry 4/14 (2.2 overs)		Mox Stokoe 29* (41); Bilal Khan 1/26 (2 overs)

Isle of Man won by 9 wickets
Royal Brussels Cricket Club Ground, Waterloo
Umpires: Alex Adams (Ire) and Bart Hartong (Ned)

- Finland won the toss and elected to bat.

22 June
10.30 p.m.
Scorecard

Portugal; 26/2 (6 overs)	v	Finland
Nadeem Butt 15 (11); Shidhu Kanade 1/5 (3 overs)

No result
Royal Brussels Cricket Club Ground, Waterloo
Umpires: Lee Goldsmith (Ire) and Ron Graham (Esp)

- Finland won the toss and elected to field.

22 June
3.30 p.m.
Scorecard

Luxembourg; 141/3 (18 overs)	v	Cyprus; 101/7 (17 overs)
Taral Desai 56* (42); Babar Ayub 1/22 (2 overs)		Yasir Nazir 26 (13); Piran Merkl 3/14 (3 overs)

Luxembourg won by 41 runs (D/L)
Royal Brussels Cricket Club Ground, Waterloo
Umpires: William McPate (Sco) and Mike Rawle (Mlt)

- Luxembourg won the toss and elected to bat.

23 June
10.30 a.m.
Scorecard

Isle of Man; 142/8 (20 overs)	v	Portugal; 133/9 (20 overs)
Max Stokoe 59 (59); Babar Khan 3/31 (4 overs)		Zafar Ali 38 (17); Daniel Hawke 3/20 (4 overs)

Isle of Man won by 9 runs
Mechelen Cricket Club Ground
Umpires: Lee Goldsmith (Ire) and Allan Haggo (Sco)

- Isle of Man won the toss and elected to bat.

23 June
10.30 a.m.
Scorecard

Luxembourg; 86/8 (17 overs)	v	Finland; 70/1 (11 overs)
Sebastian Finch 17 (20); Tariq Sarfraz 2/21 (4 overs)		Michael Shaw 22 (31); Piran Merkl 1/14 (2 overs)

Finland won by 9 wickets (D/L)
Sportpark Maarschalkerweerd, Utrecht
Umpires: Alex Adams (Ire) and Mike Rawle (Mlt)

- Finland won the toss and elected to field.

23 June
3.30 p.m.
Scorecard

Cyprus; 115/6 (17 overs)	v	Portugal; 86/4 (9.2 overs)
Nimal Durayalage 33 (16); Zafar Ali 3/22 (3 overs)		Rizwan Khaliq 53* (32); Yasir Nazir 1/21 (3 overs)

Portugal won by 20 runs (D/L)
Mechelen Cricket Club Ground
Umpires: Lee Goldsmith (Ire) and Bart Hartong (Ned)

- Cyprus won the toss and elected to bat.

==== Group B ====
Team	P	W	L	T	NR	Points	NRR
Belgium	5	5	0	0	0	10	+2.432
Austria	5	3	1	1	0	7	+0.246
Spain	5	3	2	0	0	6	+2.119
Greece	5	1	2	1	1	4	–0.100
Sweden	5	1	3	0	1	3	+0.828
Malta	5	0	5	0	0	0	–5.899

20 June
10.30 a.m.
Scorecard

Greece; 98/6 (10 overs)	v	Malta; 68/9 (10 overs)
Georgios Stogiannos 36 (23); Michael Caruana 2/7 (2 overs)		Darren Grech 14 (13); Mehmood Ahmed 3/15 (2 overs)

Greece won by 30 runs
Mechelen Cricket Club Ground
Umpires: Alex Adams (Ire) and Allan Haggo (Sco)

- Malta won the toss and elected to field.

20 June
10.30 a.m.
Scorecard

Sweden; 141/5 (20 overs)	v	Spain; 145/5 (17.2 overs)
Piyal Rahman 54* (42); Farhat Mahmood 3/25 (4 overs)		James Morgan 70 (44); Ewan Prezens 2/18 (3 overs)

Spain won by 5 wickets
Royal Brussels Cricket Club Ground, Waterloo
Umpires: John Andrews (Ire) and Lindsay Horne (Sco)

- Sweden won the toss and elected to bat.

20 June
3.30 p.m.
Scorecard

Belgium; 183/6 (20 overs)	v	Austria; 123/8 (20 overs)
Abdul Rehman 58 (18); Satyam Subhash 3/26 (4 overs)		Benji Loader 50 (46); W Shafiq 3/21 (4 overs)

Belgium won by 60 runs
Mechelen Cricket Club Ground
Umpires: Allan Haggo (Sco) and John Mountford (Gue)

- Belgium won the toss and elected to bat.

20 June
3.30 p.m.
Sxorecard

Greece; 53/3 (8.3 overs)	v	Sweden
Andreas Koutsoufis 17* (23); Hassan Zaigham 2/15 (3 overs)

No result
Royal Brussels Cricket Club Ground, Waterloo
Umpires: Lindsay Horne (Sco) and William McPate (Sco)

- Greece won the toss and elected to bat.

21 June
10.30 a.m.
Scorecard

Spain; 215/8 (20 overs)	v	Malta; 30 (9.4 overs)
Shafique Ali 72 (39); Ronald Sacco 3/24 (4 overs)		Ronald Sacco 9 (14); Talat Ali 5/13 (4 overs)

Spain won by 185 runs
Mechelen Cricket Club Ground
Umpires: Ben Lougheed (Lux) and William McPate (Sco)

- Spain won the toss and elected to bat.

21 June
3.30 p.m.
Scorecard

Spain; 215/6 (20 overs)	v	Austria; 216/4 (19.5 overs)
James Morgan 71 (36); Lakmal Kasturiarachchige 2/8 (2 overs)		Amar Naeem 73 (39); Armaghan Khan 2/32 (3 overs)

Austria won by 6 wickets
Mechelen Cricket Club Ground
Umpires: John Mountford (Gue) and Mike Rawle (Mlt)

- Spain won the toss and elected to bat.

21 June
3.30 p.m.
Scorecard

Belgium; 196/8 (20 overs)	v	Sweden; 174/6 (20 overs)
Aamir Iqbal 74 (75); Azam Khalil 2/39 (4 overs)		Sanaullah Habibzai 78 (52); Andre Wagener 2/42 (4 overs)

Belgium won by 22 runs
Arcadians Cricket Club Ground, Ghent
Umpires: Ron Graham (Esp) and Allan Haggo (Sco)

- Belgium won the toss and elected to bat.

22 June
10.30 a.m.
Scorecard

Austria; 171/7 (20 overs)	v	Malta; 91/8 (20 overs)
Aman Deep 40 (38); Andrew Naudi 3/26 (3 overs)		Michael Caruana 22* (25); Lakmal Kasturiarachchige 3/20 (3 overs)

Austria won by 80 runs
Arcadians Cricket Club Ground, Ghent
Umpires: Richard Eames (Bel) and Allan Haggo (Sco)

- Austria won the toss and elected to bat.

22 June
10.30 a.m.
Scorecard

Greece; 149/9 (20 overs)	v	Belgium; 150/3 (18.3 overs)
Anastasios Manousis 37 (32); Andre Wagener 2/19 (3 overs)		Shaheryar Butt 45* (22); Anastasios Manousis 2/26 (4 overs)

Belgium won by 7 wickets
Mechelen Cricket Club Ground
Umpires: Ben Lougheed (Lux) and John Mountford (Gue)

- Greece won the toss and elected to bat.

22 June
3.30 p.m.
Scorecard

Sweden; 160/5 (20 overs)	v	Malta; 48 (18.5 overs)
Christopher Tebbutt 29 (18); Michael Caruana 2/25 (4 overs)		John Grima 10* (23); Usman Azim 4/14 (4 overs)

Sweden won by 112 runs
Arcadians Cricket Club Ground, Ghent
Umpires: Alex Adams (Ire) and John Andrews (Ire)

- Malta won the toss and elected to field.

22 June
3.30 p.m.
Scorecard

Greece; 142/6 (20 overs)	v	Spain; 146/3 (17.3 overs)
Georgios Stogiannos 45 (21); Tanveer Iqbal 2/28 (4 overs)		Shafique Ali 50 (34); Oliver Hutton 2/17 (2 overs)

Spain won by 7 wickets
Mechelen Cricket Club Ground
Umpires: Bart Hartong (Ned) and Ben Lougheed (Lux)

- Greece won the toss and elected to bat.

23 June
10.30 a.m.
Scorecard

Belgium; 169 (20 overs)	v	Spain; 143 (18.2 overs)
Sunny Sheikh 38 (29); Farhat Mahmood 3/35 (4 overs)		James Morgan 27 (22); Aamir Iqbal 4/29 (4 overs)

Belgium won by 26 runs
Royal Brussels Cricket Club Ground, Waterloo
Umpires: Richard Eames (Bel) and William McPate (Sco)

- Spain won the toss and elected to field.

23 June
10.30 a.m.
Scorecard

Sweden; 154/6 (20 overs)	v	Austria; 155/9 (20 overs)
Sunny Sharma 83 (60); Benji Loader 2/3 (1 over)		Lakmal Kasturiarachchige 47 (33); Azam Khalil 2/22 (4 overs)

Austria won by 1 wickets
Arcadians Cricket Club Ground, Ghent
Umpires: Ron Graham (Esp) and Ben Lougheed (Lux)

- Sweden won the toss and elected to bat.

23 June
3.30 p.m.
Scorecard

Belgium; 194/6 (19 overs)	v	Malta; 76/4 (19 overs)
Jamie Farmiloe 63 (52); Nowell Khosla 1/29 (4 overs)		Michael Caruana 29* (63); Shaival Mehta 1/10 (3 overs); Shahid Muhammad 1/10 (3 overs)

Belgium won by 118 runs (D/L)
Royal Brussels Cricket Club Ground, Waterloo
Umpires: William McPate (Sco) and John Mountford (Gue)

- Malta won the toss and elected to field.

23 June
3.30 p.m.
Scorecard

Austria; 116/8 (15 overs)	v	Greece; 116/8 (15 overs)
Amar Naeem 55 (44); Spyridon Goustis 2/15 (3 overs)		Iordanis Kontarinis 42 (35); Nandeep Soggi 2/13 (2 overs)

Match tied (D/L)
Arcadians Cricket Club Ground, Ghent
Umpires: John Andrews (Ire) and Ben Lougheed (Lux)

- Greece won the toss and elected to field.

=== Play-offs ===
==== Semi-final ====
24 June
10.30 a.m.
Scorecard

Isle of Man; 94 (19 overs)	v	Austria; 96/4 (13.1 overs)
Christopher Hawke 58 (47); Muhammad Akhtar 4/5 (4 overs)		Lakmal Kasturiarachchige 43 (31); Christopher Hawke 1/5 (2 overs)

Austria won by 6 wickets
Royal Brussels Cricket Club Ground, Waterloo
Umpires: Ron Graham (Esp) and John Mountford (Gue)

- Austria won the toss and elected to field.

==== Semi-final ====
24 June
10.30 a.m.
Scorecard

Belgium; 236/2 (20 overs)	v	Portugal; 91 (17.1 overs)
Shaheryar Butt 73* (27); MuhammadShoaib 1/35 (4 overs)		Nadeem Butt 18 (12); W Shafiq 4/25 (4 overs)

Belgium won by 145 runs
Arcadians Cricket Club Ground, Ghent
Umpires: Allan Haggo (Sco) and William McPate (Sco)

- Portugal won the toss and elected to field.

==== 9th-place play-off League ====
24 June
10.30 a.m.
Scorecard

Malta; 158/8 (20 overs)	v	Cyprus; 119 (17.2 overs)
Andrew Naudi 62 (51); Michalis Kyriacou 3/22 (3 overs)		Michalis Kyriacou 72* (42); Michael Caruana 4/15 (4 overs)

Malta won by 39 runs
Mechelen Cricket Club Ground
Umpires: Alex Adams (Ire) and Ben Lougheed (Lux)

- Malta won the toss and elected to bat.

==== 5th-place play-off semi-final ====
24 June
3.30 a.m.
Scorecard

Greece; 168/5 (20 overs)	v	Finland; 149 (19 overs)
Oliver Hutton 42 (50); Obaidullah Sadiqui 1/28 (4 overs)		Ekhpaelwak Kuchey 34 (22); Oliver Hutton 3/12 (2 overs)

Greece won by 19 runs
Royal Brussels Cricket Club Ground, Waterloo
Umpires: Lee Goldsmith (Ire) and Mike Rawle (Mlt)

- Finland won the toss and elected to field.

==== 5th-place play-off semi-final ====
24 June
3.30 p.m.
Scorecard

Luxembourg; 86/7 (20 overs)	v	Spain; 87/2 (12.5 overs)
Taral Desai 27* (30); Talat Nadeem 2/18 (4 overs)		Christian Munoz-Mills 27* (34); Anand Pattabiraman 1/20 (3 overs)

Spain won by 8 wickets
Arcadians Cricket Club Ground, Ghent
Umpires: Richard Eames (Bel) and Bart Hartong (Ned)

- Luxembourg won the toss and elected to bat.

==== 5th-place play-off ====
25 June
10.30 a.m.
Scorecard

Spain; 141/8 (20 overs)	v	Greece; 106/9 (20 overs)
Gary Crompton 26 (23); Alexis Souvlakis 2/28 (4 overs)		Alexis Souvlakis 24* (24); Mohib Hussein 3/13 (4 overs)

Spain won by 35 runs
Arcadians Cricket Club Ground, Ghent
Umpires: Ben Lougheed (Lux) and William McPate (Sco)

==== 3rd-place play-off ====
25 June
10.30 a.m.
Scorecard

Isle of Man; 155/4 (19 overs)	v	Portugal; 142/9 (19 overs)
Oliver Webster 68 (42); Khalid Izaz 2/17 (3 overs)		Nadeem Butt 53 (31); Oliver Webster 2/1 (1 overs)

Isle of Man won by 13 runs
Royal Brussels Cricket Club Ground, Waterloo
Umpires: Alex Adams (Ire) and Allan Haggo (Sco)

- Isle of Man won the toss and elected to bat.

==== 9th-place play-off League ====
25 June
10.30 a.m.
Scorecard

Malta; 95/4 (12 overs)	v	Sweden; 92/9 (12 overs)
Justin Brooke 36 (28); Aman Zahid 1/3 (1 over)		Bilal Zaigham 31 (30); Andrew Naudi 4/9 (3 overs)

Malta won by 3 runs
Mechelen Cricket Club Ground
Umpires: Ron Graham (Esp) and Mike Rawle (Mlt)

- Malta won the toss and elected to bat.

==== Final ====
25 June
2.30 p.m.
Scorecard

Belgium; 188/7 (20 overs)	v	Austria; 115 (17.5 overs)
Nirvam Shah 58 (38); Satyam Subhash 3/35 (4 overs)		Simpson-Parker 48 (36); Faisal Khaliq 4/11 (2.5 overs)

Belgium won by 73 runs
Royal Brussels Cricket Club Ground, Waterloo
Umpires: Lee Goldsmith (Ire) and Bart Hartong (Ned)

- Austria won the toss and elected to field.

==== 9th-place play-off League ====
25 June
2.30 a.m.
Scorecard

Cyprus; 199/8 (20 overs)	v	Sweden; 121 (16.2 overs)
Nimal Durayalage 56 (33); Ewan Prezens 3/6 (1 over)		Bilal Zaigham 32 (26); Yasir Nazir 3/16 (3 overs)

Cyprus won by 78 runs
Mechelen Cricket Club Ground
Umpires: Richard Eames (Bel) and Ron Graham (Esp)

- Cyprus won the toss and elected to bat.

==== 7th-place play-off ====
25 June
2.30 p.m.
Scorecard

Luxembourg; 101/9 (20 overs)	v	Finland; 104/8 (19.1 overs)
Joost Mees 19 (18); Madhu Bhandari 3/18 (4 overs)		Shabir Sheerzad 23 (24); James Barker 2/16 (4 overs)

Finland won by 2 wickets
Arcadians Cricket Club Ground, Ghent
Umpires: John Andrews (Ire) and John Mountford (Gue)

- Finland won the toss and elected to field.

== Final Placings ==
Pos	Team	Promotion/relegation
1st	Belgium	Promoted to 2011 ICC European T20 Championship Division One
2nd	Austria	Promoted to 2011 ICC European T20 Championship Division One
3rd	Isle of Man	Remain in 2012 ICC European T20 Championship Division Two
4th	Portugal	Remain in 2012 ICC European T20 Championship Division Two
5th	Spain	Remain in 2012 ICC European T20 Championship Division Two
6th	Greece	Remain in 2012 ICC European T20 Championship Division Two
7th	Finland	Remain in 2012 ICC European T20 Championship Division Two
8th	Luxembourg	Remain in 2012 ICC European T20 Championship Division Two
9th	Malta	Remain in 2012 ICC European T20 Championship Division Two
10th	Cyprus	Remain in 2012 ICC European T20 Championship Division Two
11th	Sweden	Remain in 2012 ICC European T20 Championship Division Two

== Statistics ==
=== Highest team totals ===
The following table lists the six highest team scores.

Team	Total	Opponent	Ground
Belgium	236/2	Portugal	Arcadians Cricket Club Ground, Ghent
Isle of Man	224/4	Cyprus	Arcadians Cricket Club Ground, Ghent
Austria	216/4	Spain	Mechelen Cricket Club Ground
Spain	215/8	Malta	Mechelen Cricket Club Ground
Spain	215/6	Austria	Mechelen Cricket Club Ground
Isle of Man	200/3	Luxembourg	Arcadians Cricket Club Ground, Ghent

=== Most runs ===
The top five highest run scorers (total runs) are included in this table.

Player	Team	Runs	Inns	Avg	S/R	HS	100s	50s	4s	6s
Gareth Morris	Isle of Man	289	6	57.80	200.69	141*	1	1	24	20
James Morgan	Spain	244	7	34.85	132.60	71	0	2	22	8
Nirvam Shah	Belgium	236	7	39.33	122.91	69	0	2	26	1
Shaheryar Butt	Belgium	234	7	46.80	200.00	73*	0	1	18	14
Aamir Iqbal	Belgium	221	6	36.83	109.40	74	0	1	24	4

=== Highest scores ===
This table contains the top five highest scores made by a batsman in a single innings.

Player	Team	Score	Balls	4s	6s	Opponent	Ground
Gareth Morris	Isle of Man	141*	62	10	10	Cyprus	Arcadians Cricket Club Ground, Ghent
Gareth Morris	Isle of Man	95	42	7	8	Luxembourg	Arcadians Cricket Club Ground, Ghent
Sunny Sharma	Sweden	83	60	5	2	Austria	Arcadians Cricket Club Ground, Ghent
Sanaullah Habibzai	Sweden	78	52	6	4	Belgium	Arcadians Cricket Club Ground, Ghent
Aamir Iqbal	Belgium	74	75	7	2	Sweden	Arcadians Cricket Club Ground, Ghent

=== Most wickets ===
The following table contains the five leading wicket-takers.

Player	Team	Wkts	Mts	Ave	S/R	Econ	BBI
Andrew Naudi	Malta	14	7	13.35	10.2	7.79	4/9
Arnie van den Berg	Isle of Man	12	6	8.33	10.5	4.72	4/7
Michael Caruana	Malta	12	7	14.75	12.5	7.08	4/16
Ronald Sacco	Malta	11	7	17.90	12.5	8.56	3/24
W Shafiq	Belgium	10	6	13.70	14.4	5.70	4/25

=== Best bowling figures ===
This table lists the top five players with the best bowling figures.

Player	Team	Overs	Figures	Opponent	Ground
Talat Ali	Spain	4.0	5/13	Malta	Mechelen Cricket Club Ground
Muhammad Akhtar	Austria	4.0	4/5	Isle of Man	Royal Brussels Cricket Club Ground, Waterloo
Arnie van den Berg	Isle of Man	4.0	4/7	Luxembourg	Arcadians Cricket Club Ground, Ghent
Andrew Naudi	Malta	3.0	4/9	Sweden	Mechelen Cricket Club Ground
Faisal Khaliq	Belgium	2.5	4/11	Austria	Royal Brussels Cricket Club Ground, Waterloo

== See also ==
- 2012 ICC World Twenty20 Qualifier
- European Cricket Championship
