= 2026 EUT20 Belgium =

Inaugural edition of EUT20 Belgium

2026 EUT20 Belgium season
- Dates: 6 – 14 June 2026
- Administrator(s): Belgian Cricket Federation; Destino Legends Sports LLC
- Cricket format: Twenty20
- Tournament format(s): Single round-robin, Playoff league and final
- Champions: Ghent Gladiators (1st title)
- Runners-up: Antwerp Anchors
- Participants: 5
- Matches: 18
- Player of the series: JJ Smit (Antwerp Anchors)
- Most runs: Josh Brown (229)
- Most wickets: Tristan Luus (10)
- Official website: eu-t20.com

The 2026 EUT20 Belgium was the inaugural season of the EUT20 Belgium, a professional men's Twenty20 cricket league in Belgium. The tournament featured five franchise teams representing Belgian cities. The competition was played from 6 to 14 June 2026 in a single round-robin format, followed by the Playoff league and the final.

The final was held on 14 June 2026, when the Ghent Gladiators defeated the Antwerp Anchors by 3 wickets to win the inaugural title. Ali Khan of the Ghent Gladiators was awarded the man of the match award for his match-winning performance, while JJ Smit of the Antwerp Anchors was named player of the tournament.

== Background ==
The league was established in late 2025 to professionalise cricket in Europe, with former England captain Eoin Morgan serving as the global brand ambassador. All matches were played at the Stars Arena in Zemst, near Brussels. Zemst is a municipality located in the province of Flemish Brabant, Belgium.

=== Format ===
The 2026 EUT20 Belgium season followed a franchise T20 format featuring five teams.

The league stage was played in a single round-robin format, with each team playing the others once for a total of 10 matches. Following this stage, the fourth and fifth-placed teams contested a qualifying match, with the winner securing the final spot in the playoff league.

The top four teams then advanced to the Playoff league, which was played in a single round-robin format with six matches, and the top two teams qualified for the final to decide the champion.

== Draft and personnel signings ==
=== Draft ===
The player draft for the 2026 season took place on 24 March 2026.

Teams acquired players through a centralized player draft. Each squad, consisting of 16 to 18 members, had to follow strict roster requirements:

- Domestic: 4 Belgian players (minimum 2 in the starting XI; compulsory for every squad).
- Associate: 4 players from ICC Associate nations.
- International: 4 active Full Member international players.
- Veterans: 6 Full Member players who had not played international cricket in the last two years.

=== Personnel signings ===
Each franchise had a salary budget of approximately £183,000 ($250,000), with individual player contracts ranging from £1,500 to £22,000 ($2,000–$30,000).

Ahead of the draft, several high-profile international stars were confirmed as pre-signings.

West Indies all-rounder Sheldon Cottrell, Bangladeshi all-rounder Shakib Al Hasan, South African batter Rilee Rossouw, and English internationals Jason Roy and Alex Hales were announced as pre-signings for Akcel United Brussels.

West Indies all-rounder Andre Russell, New Zealand international Martin Guptill, and South African players Hardus Viljoen, Delano Potgieter, and Wihan Lubbe were pre-signed by the Antwerp Anchors.

South African internationals Temba Bavuma, Dwaine Pretorius, and all-rounder Duan Jansen along with English international James Vince, and Australian batter Josh Brown were pre-signed by the Ghent Gladiators for the inaugural season of the tournament.

South African internationals Rassie van der Dussen, and Wayne Parnell, New Zealand international Colin Munro, Nepalese all-rounder Dipendra Singh Airee, and Indian all-rounder Nikhil Chaudhary were announced as pre-signings for JB Bruges.

United States all-rounder Corey Anderson, Pakistani all-rounder Shoaib Malik, Australian batsman Chris Lynn, Nepali leg-spinner Sandeep Lamichhane, and South African batter Faf du Plessis were pre-signed by the Liège Red Lions ahead of the inaugural season.

== Teams ==
The following five franchises were confirmed for the inaugural season.

Team	Captain	Head coach
Akcel United Brussels	Rilee Rossouw	Mark Boucher
Antwerp Anchors	Martin Guptill	Donovan Miller
Ghent Gladiators	Temba Bavuma	Jonathan Trott
JB Bruges	Wayne Parnell	Shivnarine Chanderpaul
Liège Red Lions	Faf du Plessis	Herschelle Gibbs

== Squads ==
The following squads were confirmed for the inaugural season of the EUT20 Belgium.

Akcel United Brussels	Antwerp Anchors	Ghent Gladiators	JB Bruges	Liège Red Lions
(South Africa) Rilee Rossouw (c); (Belgium) Abdul Hai Muhammad; (Belgium) Khalid Ahmadi; (Belgium) Sefat Shagharai; (Belgium) Sultan Diwan Ali (wk); (Afghanistan) Faridoon Dawoodzai; (Australia) Tom Rogers; (Bangladesh) Shakib Al Hasan; (Canada) Yuvraj Samra; (England) Alex Hales; (England) Jason Roy; (England) Ravi Bopara; (France) Dawood Ahmadzai; (Italy) Thomas Draca; (Netherlands) Bas de Leede; (New Zealand) Dale Phillips; (New Zealand) Danru Ferns; (South Africa) Gideon Peters; (Scotland) Jack Jarvis; (United States) Andries Gous (wk); (United States) Hassan Khan; (Cricket West Indies) Sheldon Cottrell	(New Zealand) Martin Guptill (c); (Belgium) Abdul Jabar Jabarkhail; (Belgium) Burhan Niaz; (Belgium) Saidhakim Khaskar; (Belgium) Sher Ali; (Australia) Peter Hatzoglou; (Denmark) Lucky Ali; (England) Moeen Ali; (England) Tom Moores (wk); (Namibia) David Wiese; (Namibia) JJ Smit; (Namibia) Ruben Trumpelmann; (Nepal) ~~Aasif Sheikh (wk)~~; (Nepal) Lokesh Bam (wk); (New Zealand) Max Chu (wk); (South Africa) Delano Potgieter; (South Africa) Hardus Viljoen; (South Africa) Tristan Luus; (South Africa) Wihan Lubbe; (Scotland) Mark Watt; (Sweden) Advait Dhabe; (Sweden) ~~Saad Nawaz~~; (United Arab Emirates) Aayan Afzal Khan; (Cricket West Indies) Andre Russell	(South Africa) Temba Bavuma (c); (Belgium) Antum Naqvi; (Belgium) Hadisullah Tarakhel; (Belgium) Iftikhar Kankhel; (Belgium) Sherul Mehta (wk); (Afghanistan) Waqar Salamkheil; (Australia) Josh Brown; (Australia) Sam Harper (wk); (England) James Vince; (India) Ajay Kumar; (Italy) Ali Hasan; (Italy) Ben Manenti; (Italy) ~~Crishan Kalugamage~~; (Italy) JJ Smuts; (Namibia) Bernard Scholtz; (Nepal) Rohit Paudel; (South Africa) Duan Jansen; (South Africa) Dwaine Pretorius; (Scotland) ~~Matthew Cross (wk)~~; (Scotland) Richie Berrington; (United Arab Emirates) Khuzaima Tanveer; (United States) Ali Khan	(South Africa) Wayne Parnell (c); (Belgium) Muneeb Muhammad; (Belgium) Nishchal Shrestha; (Belgium) Saber Zakhil; (Belgium) Shafiullah Zakhel; (Belgium) Shaheryar Butt; (Australia) Jack Wildermuth; (Australia) Nikhil Chaudhary; (England) Adam Rossington (wk); (Greece) Ari Karvelas; (Nepal) Anil Sah (wk); (Nepal) Dipendra Singh Airee; (Nepal) Gulshan Jha; (Nepal) Ishan Pandey; (Nepal) Lalit Rajbanshi; (New Zealand) Colin Munro; (South Africa) ~~Evan Jones~~; (South Africa) Rassie van der Dussen; (South Africa) Thomas Kaber; (Sri Lanka) Lahiru Milantha (wk); (United Arab Emirates) ~~Junaid Siddique~~	(South Africa) Faf du Plessis (c); (Belgium) Ali Raza (wk); (Belgium) Ashiqullah Said; (Belgium) Murid Ekrami; (Belgium) Omid Malik Khel (wk); (Belgium) Omid Rahimi; (Australia) Ben Dunk (wk); (Australia) Chris Lynn; (Australia) Hayden Kerr; (Canada) Kaleem Sana; (England) Freddie Heldreich; (Nepal) Sandeep Lamichhane; (Pakistan) Shoaib Malik; (South Africa) Gomolemo Phiri; (Scotland) Jasper Davidson; (Sri Lanka) Ramesh Mendis; (United States) Corey Anderson; (United States) Harmeet Singh; (United States) Shadley van Schalkwyk; (Cricket West Indies) Obed McCoy; (Cricket West Indies) Shaaron Lewis

Crishan Kalugamage and Matthew Cross, who were acquired by the Ghent Gladiators during the draft, were later removed from the squad in the team's new announcement on 10 May 2026, and were replaced by Ali Hasan and Ali Khan on 20 May and 21 May 2026, respectively. The franchise also announced the signings of Bernard Scholtz and JJ Smuts on 6 June 2026, as supplementary additions to the squad.

Lokesh Bam was signed by the Antwerp Anchors as a replacement for Saad Nawaz. On 1 June 2026, the franchise announced that Aasif Sheikh would be unavailable due to national team commitments at the Asian Games – Men's Qualifier. Later that day, the team also announced the signings of Tom Moores, JJ Smit, and Peter Hatzoglou as supplementary additions to the squad, even after the conclusion of the player draft. On 6 June 2026, Moeen Ali was also added to the team.

Akcel United Brussels announced the signings of Danru Ferns, Jack Jarvis, Thomas Draca, Dale Phillips, and Thomas Rogers as supplementary additions to the squad even after the conclusion of the player draft.

Liège Red Lions announced the signings of Hayden Kerr, Shaaron Lewis and Murid Ekrami as supplementary additions to the squad even after the conclusion of the player draft.

Despite not being officially announced in the initial squad, Jack Wildermuth was seen playing for JB Bruges in their match against the Ghent Gladiators.

== Venue ==
Venue in Belgium
Hofstade, Zemst	Location of the Stars Arena in Hofstade, Zemst, in the province of Flemish Brabant, Belgium.
Stars Arena	Location of the Stars Arena in Hofstade, Zemst, in the province of Flemish Brabant, Belgium.
Capacity: 600	Location of the Stars Arena in Hofstade, Zemst, in the province of Flemish Brabant, Belgium.
Stars Arena in 2026	Location of the Stars Arena in Hofstade, Zemst, in the province of Flemish Brabant, Belgium.

== Match officials ==
=== Umpires ===
- Billy Bowden
- Anil Chaudhary
- Ruchira Palliyaguruge
- Chris Brown
- Paul Wilson

=== Match Referees ===
- Simon Taufel

== League stage ==
=== Points table ===
Pos	Team	Pld	W	L	NR	Pts	NRR	Qualification
1	Akcel United Brussels	4	2	0	2	6	1.233	Advanced to the Playoff league
2	Antwerp Anchors	4	2	1	1	5	0.970	Advanced to the Playoff league
3	JB Bruges	4	2	2	0	4	−0.162	Advanced to the Playoff league
4	Ghent Gladiators	4	0	1	3	3	0.000	Advanced to the Playoff league
5	Liège Red Lions	4	0	2	2	2	−2.733	Eliminated

Source: ESPNcricinfo

=== Match summary ===
Team	Group matches				POQ
Team	1	2	3	4	POQ
Akcel United Brussels	2	4	5	6	
Antwerp Anchors	0	1	3	5	
Ghent Gladiators	1	1	2	3	W
JB Bruges	0	2	4	4	
Liège Red Lions	1	1	2	2	L

Win	Loss	No result

- Note: The total points at the end of each stage match are listed.
- Note: Click on the points or W/L indicators to see the match summary.

Visitor team → Home team ↓	AB	AA	GG	JB	LL
Akcel United Brussels					
Antwerp Anchors	Brussels; 4 wickets		Match abandoned		Antwerp; 46 runs
Ghent Gladiators	Match abandoned				
JB Bruges	Brussels; 6 wickets (DLS)	Antwerp; 5 wickets (DLS)	Bruges; Super Over		Bruges; 36 runs
Liège Red Lions	Match abandoned		Match abandoned		

Home team won	Visitor team won

- Note: Results listed are according to the home (horizontal) and visitor (vertical) teams.
- Note: Click on a result to see a summary of the match.

=== Fixtures ===
The EUT20 Belgium announced the fixtures on 8 April 2026.

Match 1
6 June 2026
12:30
Scorecard

JB Bruges; 159/7 (20 overs)	v	Akcel United Brussels; 124/4 (12.5 overs)
Lahiru Milantha 51 (35); Dale Phillips 2/30 (4 overs)		Thomas Rogers 45 (21); Wayne Parnell 2/11 (2 overs)

Akcel United Brussels won by 6 wickets (DLS method)
Stars Arena, Zemst
Umpires: Chris Brown (NZ) and Ruchira Palliyaguruge (SL)
Player of the match: Thomas Rogers (Akcel United Brussels)

- JB Bruges won the toss and elected to bat.
- No further play was possible due to rain.

Match 2
6 June 2026
16:30
Scorecard

Ghent Gladiators; 41/4 (7.4 overs)	v	Liège Red Lions
Temba Bavuma 15 (9); Corey Anderson 1/3 (1 over)

No result
Stars Arena, Zemst
Umpires: Anil Chaudhary (Ind) and Billy Bowden (NZ)

- Liege Red Lions won the toss and elected to field.
- The match was reduced to 13 overs per side due to rain.
- No further play was possible due to rain.

Match 3
7 June 2026
12:30
Scorecard

JB Bruges; 166/6 (20 overs)	v	Ghent Gladiators; 166/6 (20 overs)
Rassie van der Dussen 37 (24); Bernard Scholtz 1/12 (2 overs)		Sam Harper 75 (48); Thomas Kaber 3/26 (4 overs)

Match tied (JB Bruges won the Super Over)
Stars Arena, Zemst
Umpires: Chris Brown (NZ) and Paul Wilson (Aus)
Player of the match: Nikhil Chaudhary (JB Bruges)

- Ghent Gladiators won the toss and elected to field.
- Super Over: Ghent Gladiators 3/2, JB Bruges 4/1

Match 4
7 June 2026
16:30
Scorecard

Antwerp Anchors; 174/9 (20 overs)	v	Akcel United Brussels; 178/6 (19 overs)
Martin Guptill 44 (32); Danru Ferns 3/15 (4 overs)		Dale Phillips 42* (24); David Wiese 3/47 (4 overs)

Akcel United Brussels won by 4 wickets
Stars Arena, Zemst
Umpires: Billy Bowden (NZ) and Ruchira Palliyaguruge (SL)
Player of the match: Dale Phillips (Akcel United Brussels)

- Antwerp Anchors won the toss and elected to bat.

Match 5
8 June 2026
12:30
Scorecard

JB Bruges; 121/5 (10 overs)	v	Liège Red Lions; 85/7 (10 overs)
Rassie van der Dussen 66 (30); Shoaib Malik 1/1 (1 over)		Shoaib Malik 23 (12); Thomas Kaber 3/9 (2 overs)

JB Bruges won by 36 runs
Stars Arena, Zemst
Umpires: Anil Chaudhary (Ind) and Paul Wilson (Aus)
Player of the match: Rassie van der Dussen (JB Bruges)

- Liege Red Lions won the toss and elected to field.
- The match was reduced to 10 overs per side due to rain.

Match 6
8 June 2026
16:30
Scorecard

Antwerp Anchors; 207/5 (20 overs)	v	Ghent Gladiators
Josh Brown 85 (44); Ruben Trumpelmann 2/17 (3 overs)

No result
Stars Arena, Zemst
Umpires: Billy Bowden (NZ) and Ruchira Palliyaguruge (SL)

- Antwerp Anchors won the toss and elected to field.
- No further play was possible due to rain.

Match 7
9 June 2026
12:30
Scorecard

Liège Red Lions; 82/6 (11.1 overs)	v	Akcel United Brussels
Gerhard Erasmus 28 (20); Jack Jarvis 3/12 (2 overs)

No result
Stars Arena, Zemst
Umpires: Billy Bowden (NZ) and Ruchira Palliyaguruge (SL)

- Liege Red Lions won the toss and elected to bat.
- The match was reduced to 12 overs per side due to rain.
- No further play was possible due to rain.

Match 8
9 June 2026
16:30
Scorecard

JB Bruges; 105/9 (14 overs)	v	Antwerp Anchors; 112/5 (12.3 overs)
Adam Rossington 37 (20); Tristan Luus 3/16 (3 overs)		Moeen Ali 72* (39); Dipendra Singh Airee 2/16 (3 overs)

Antwerp Anchors won by 5 wickets (DLS method)
Stars Arena, Zemst
Umpires: Paul Wilson (Aus) and Ruchira Palliyaguruge (SL)
Player of the match: Moeen Ali (Antwerp Anchors)

- JB Bruges won the toss and elected to bat.
- The match was reduced to 14 overs per side due to rain.
- Antwerp Anchors were set a revised target of 108 runs in 14 overs due to rain.

Match 9
10 June 2026
08:30
Scorecard

Ghent Gladiators; 91/2 (6 overs)	v	Akcel United Brussels
Josh Brown 59 (22); Jack Jarvis 1/0 (1 over)

No result
Stars Arena, Zemst
Umpires: Anil Chaudhary (Ind) and Billy Bowden (NZ)

- Akcel United Brussels won the toss and elected to field.
- The match was reduced to 10 overs per side due to rain.
- No further play was possible due to rain.

Match 10
10 June 2026
12:30
Scorecard

Antwerp Anchors; 178/9 (20 overs)	v	Liège Red Lions; 132 (17.5 overs)
Mark Watt 50 (27); Corey Anderson 3/17 (4 overs)		Faf du Plessis 53 (38); David Wiese 3/23 (3 overs)

Antwerp Anchors won by 46 runs
Stars Arena, Zemst
Umpires: Anil Chaudhary (Ind) and Paul Wilson (Aus)
Player of the match: David Wiese (Antwerp Anchors)

- Antwerp Anchors won the toss and elected to bat.

Match 11 (Playoff league qualifier)
10 June 2026
16:30
Scorecard

Liège Red Lions; 3/0 (1 over)	v	Ghent Gladiators
Faf du Plessis 2* (2)

No result
Stars Arena, Zemst
Umpires: Chris Brown (NZ) and Ruchira Palliyaguruge (SL)

- Liege Red Lions won the toss and elected to bat.
- The match was reduced to 13 overs per side due to rain.
- No further play was possible due to rain.
- Ghent Gladiators qualified for the playoff league by points table standing as the match was abandoned due to rain.

== Playoff league ==
=== Points table ===
Pos	Team	Pld	W	L	NR	Pts	NRR	Qualification
1	Ghent Gladiators	3	1	0	2	4	1.050	Advance to the Final
2	Antwerp Anchors (Note: JB Bruges were deducted 1 point by the tournament technical committee due to an administrative regulation violation, and the point was awarded to Antwerp Anchors.)	3	1	1	1	4	0.450	Advance to the Final
3	Akcel United Brussels	3	1	1	1	3	2.200	Eliminated
4	JB Bruges (Note: JB Bruges were deducted 1 point by the tournament technical committee due to an administrative regulation violation, and the point was awarded to Antwerp Anchors.)	3	0	1	2	1	−6.350	Eliminated

Source: Crex

=== Match summary ===
Team	Playoff league			F
Team	1	2	3	F
Akcel United Brussels	0	1	3	
Antwerp Anchors	2	4	4	L
Ghent Gladiators	1	2	4	W
JB Bruges	1	1	1	

Win	Loss	No result

- Note: The total points at the end of each stage match are listed.
- Note: Click on the points or W/L indicators to see the match summary.

Visitor team → Home team ↓	AB	AA	GG	JB
Akcel United Brussels		Antwerp; 39 runs	Match abandoned	Brussels; 127 runs
Antwerp Anchors			Ghent; 21 runs	Match abandoned
Ghent Gladiators				Match abandoned
JB Bruges				

Home team won	Visitor team won

- Note: Results listed are according to the home (horizontal) and visitor (vertical) teams.
- Note: Click on a result to see a summary of the match.

=== Fixtures ===
The EUT20 Belgium announced the fixtures on 8 April 2026.

Match 12
11 June 2026
12:30
Scorecard

Antwerp Anchors; 221/6 (20 overs)	v	Akcel United Brussels; 182/8 (20 overs)
Martin Guptill 114 (58); Khalid Ahmadi 2/43 (4 overs)		Dale Phillips 40 (20); Moeen Ali 3/16 (4 overs)

Antwerp Anchors won by 39 runs
Stars Arena, Zemst
Umpires: Billy Bowden (NZ) and Ruchira Palliyaguruge (SL)
Player of the match: Martin Guptill (Antwerp Anchors)

- Akcel United Brussels won the toss and elected to field.

Match 13
11 June 2026
16:30
Scorecard

Ghent Gladiators	v	JB Bruges

No result
Stars Arena, Zemst

- JB Bruges won the toss and elected to field.
- No play was possible due to rain.

Match 14
12 June 2026
12:30
Scorecard

Akcel United Brussels	v	Ghent Gladiators

Match abandoned
Stars Arena, Zemst

- No toss.
- No play was possible due to rain.

Match 15
12 June 2026
16:30
Scorecard

Antwerp Anchors	v	JB Bruges

Match abandoned
Stars Arena, Zemst

- No toss.
- No play was possible due to rain.
- JB Bruges were deducted 1 point by the tournament technical committee due to an administrative regulation violation, and the point was awarded to Antwerp Anchors.

Match 16
13 June 2026
12:30
Scorecard

Ghent Gladiators; 144 (19.5 overs)	v	Antwerp Anchors; 123 (17.4 overs)
JJ Smuts 26 (25); Tristan Luus 3/24 (2.5 overs)		Ruben Trumpelmann 27 (15); Dwaine Pretorius 4/18 (4 overs)

Ghent Gladiators won by 21 runs
Stars Arena, Zemst
Umpires: Anil Chaudhary (Ind) and Ruchira Palliyaguruge (SL)
Player of the match: Dwaine Pretorius (Ghent Gladiators)

- Ghent Gladiators won the toss and elected to bat.

Match 17
13 June 2026
16:30
Scorecard

Akcel United Brussels; 244/3 (20 overs)	v	JB Bruges; 117 (15.1 overs)
Andries Gous 67* (36); Saber Zakhil 1/22 (4 overs)		Jack Wildermuth 36 (24); Tom Rogers 3/9 (2 overs)

Akcel United Brussels won by 127 runs
Stars Arena, Zemst
Umpires: Billy Bowden (NZ) and Chris Brown (NZ)
Player of the match: Tom Rogers (Akcel United Brussels)

- JB Bruges won the toss and elected to field.

== Final ==
Match 18
14 June 2026
16:30
Scorecard

Antwerp Anchors; 178/6 (20 overs)	v	Ghent Gladiators; 181/7 (19.5 overs)
Tom Moores 63 (34); Ali Khan 2/15 (4 overs)		Sam Harper 47 (23); Moeen Ali 3/52 (4 overs)

Ghent Gladiators won by 3 wickets
Stars Arena, Zemst
Umpires: Anil Chaudhary (Ind) and Billy Bowden (NZ)
Player of the match: Ali Khan (Ghent Gladiators)

- Antwerp Anchors won the toss and elected to bat.

== Broadcasting ==
The league was broadcast live on the following channels:

Country	Television Rights	Streaming Rights
Nepal	Sony Sports; Kantipur Max	Kantipur Max (YouTube)
India	Sony Sports	FanCode
Middle East and North Africa	None	Sportvot
Southeast Asia	None	Sportvot
New Zealand	None	Sportvot
United States and Canada	Willow TV	Willow TV (YouTube)
Rest of the World	Sony Sports	Willow TV (YouTube)
