= List of Twenty20 cricket competitions =

List of all the Twenty20 cricket competitions active and defunct

Twenty20 is one of the three forms of cricket recognised by the International Cricket Council (ICC) as being played at the highest level, both internationally and domestically. It was introduced by the England and Wales Cricket Board (ECB) in 2003, with the T20 Blast, first ever tournament in history of T20 Cricket. A typical Twenty20 game is completed in about three and a half hours, with each innings lasting around 90 minutes and an official 10-minute break between the innings.

== Key ==
Header	Meaning
Competition	Name of the competition, wikilinked to the article. Competitions are initially listed chronologically in the order of the inaugural edition.
Organizing body	Governing body which organized the competition.
First	Year the inaugural edition of the competition took place, wikilinked to its article if exists.
Status	Status of the competition, indicated by colors as well. Active competitions Defunct competitions
Latest	Latest edition of the competition, wikilinked to its article if exists. Ongoing or future editions are indicated by a dagger (†) symbol next to it.
Current champions	Current/defending champions of the competition; listed only for active competitions.
Notes	Additional information about the competition.

== Multi-national competitions ==
Multi-national Twenty20 competitions
Competition	First	Status	Latest	Current champions	Notes	Ref.
International 20:20 Club Championship	2005	Defunct	2005	—N/a	Played by club teams from 4 countries.	
Indian Cricket League	2007	Defunct	2009	—N/a	Played by club teams from India, Pakistan and Bangladesh.	
Stanford Super Series	2008	Defunct	2008	—N/a	Played by club teams from England and the Caribbean.	
Champions League Twenty20	2009	Defunct	2014	—N/a	Played by club teams of various countries.	
North Sea Pro Series	2014	Defunct	2015	—N/a	Played by club teams from Netherlands and Scotland.	
Africa T20 Cup	2015	Defunct	2018	—N/a	Played by club teams from 6 African countries.	
Cricket All-Stars	2015	Defunct	2015	—N/a	Exhibition series played by two teams.	
Abu Dhabi T20 Trophy	2018	Defunct	2018	—N/a	Played by club teams of 6 countries.	
Global Super League	2024	Active	2026	Guyana Amazon Warriors	Played by club teams from 5 countries.	
European T20 Premier League	2026†	Active	2026†		Played by club teams from 4 European countries.	

== Franchise competitions ==
=== Men's ===
Men's franchise Twenty20 competitions
Competition	Organizing body	First	Status	Latest	Current champions	Notes	Ref.
Indian Premier League	Board of Control for Cricket in India	2008	Active	2026	Royal Challengers Bengaluru		
Big Bash League	Cricket Australia	2011–12	Active	2025–26	Perth Scorchers		
Bangladesh Premier League	Bangladesh Cricket Board	2012	Active	2025–26	Rajshahi Warriors	Not played between 2019–20 and 2022	
Caribbean Premier League	Cricket West Indies	2013	Active	2025	Trinbago Knight Riders		
Pakistan Super League	Pakistan Cricket Board	2016	Active	2026	Peshawar Zalmi		
Global T20 Canada	Cricket Canada	2018	Active	2024	Toronto Nationals	Not played between 2019 and 2023	
Afghanistan Premier League	Afghanistan Cricket Board	2018	Active	2026†	—N/a		
Lanka Premier League	Sri Lanka Cricket	2020	Active	2026	Galle Gallants		
International League T20	Emirates Cricket Board	2023	Active	2025–26	Desert Vipers		
Major League Cricket	USA Cricket	2023	Active	2026	Los Angeles Knight Riders		
SA20	Cricket South Africa	2023	Active	2026	Sunrisers Eastern Cape		
Nepal Premier League	Cricket Association of Nepal	2024	Active	2025	Lumbini Lions		
EUT20 Belgium	Belgian Cricket Federation	2026	Active	2026	Ghent Gladiators		

=== Women's ===
Women's franchise Twenty20 competitions
Competition	Organizing body	First	Status	Latest	Current champions	Notes	Ref.
Women's Big Bash League	Cricket Australia	2015–16	Active	2025	Hobart Hurricanes		
Women's Caribbean Premier League	Cricket West Indies	2022	Active	2025	Barbados Royals		
Women's Premier League	Board of Control for Cricket in India	2023	Active	2026	Royal Challengers Bengaluru		
T20 Spring Challenge	Cricket Australia	2024	Active	2025	Hobart Hurricanes		

== National-level competitions ==
=== Africa ===
National Twenty20 competitions in Africa region
Competition	Organizing body	First	Status	Latest	Current champions	Notes	Ref.
CSA T20 Challenge	Cricket South Africa	2004	Active	2025–26	Warriors		
Zimbabwe Domestic Twenty20	Zimbabwe Cricket	2007	Active	2025-26	Mid West Rhinos	Not played between 2011 and 2019.	
Mzansi Super League	Cricket South Africa	2018	Defunct	2019	—N/a	2 editions only.	
CSA Provincial T20 Cup	Cricket South Africa	2019	Active	2025-26	Knights		

=== Americas ===
National Twenty20 competitions in Americas region
Competition	Organizing body	First	Status	Latest	Current champions	Notes	Ref.
Stanford 20/20	Cricket West Indies	2006	Defunct	2008	—N/a	2 editions only.	
Caribbean Twenty20	Cricket West Indies	2010	Defunct	2013	—N/a	4 editions only.	
Women's Twenty20 Blaze	Cricket West Indies	2012	Active	2026	Leeward Islands	Not played between 2019 and 2022.	
West Indies Breakout League	Cricket West Indies	2025	Active	2025		To be inaugurated in 2025.	
Minor League Cricket	USA Cricket	2021	Active	2025	Atlanta Fire		

=== Asia ===
National Twenty20 competitions in Asia region
Competition	Organizing body	First	Status	Latest	Current champions	Notes	Ref.
SLC Twenty20 Tournament	Sri Lanka Cricket	2004	Defunct	2021	—N/a	Not played between 2007 and 2014.	
National T20 Cup	Pakistan Cricket Board	2005	Active	2026	Abbottabad		
Syed Mushtaq Ali Trophy	Board of Control for Cricket in India	2006-07	Active	2025-26	Jharkhand		
SLC Super Provincial Twenty20	Sri Lanka Cricket	2008	Defunct	2016	—N/a	7 editions only.	
Senior Women's T20 Trophy	Board of Control for Cricket in India	2008	Active	2025	Maharashtra		
Senior Women's T20 Challenger Trophy	Board of Control for Cricket in India	2010	Defunct	2022	—N/a	4 editions only.	
Super 8 Twenty20 Cup	Pakistan Cricket Board	2011	Defunct	2015	—N/a	4 editions only.	
Sri Lanka Premier League	Sri Lanka Cricket	2011	Defunct	2012	—N/a	2 editions only.	
Women's Prime Minister Cup	Cricket Association of Nepal	2015	Active	2025	APF Club		
Shpageeza Cricket League	Afghanistan Cricket Board	2016	Active	2024	Amo Sharks		
Hong Kong T20 Blitz	Cricket Hong Kong, China	2016	Defunct	2018	—N/a	3 editions only.	
Men's Prime Minister Cup	Cricket Association of Nepal	2017	Active	2026	Tribhuwan Army		
PCB Women's Twenty20 Tournament	Pakistan Cricket Board	2020	Defunct	2022	—N/a	3 editions only.	
Nepal T20 League	Cricket Association of Nepal	2022	Defunct	2022	—N/a		
National T20 Championship	Cricket Association of Nepal	2023	Active	2024	Lumbini Province		
Lalitpur Mayor Women's Cup	Cricket Association of Nepal	2021	Active	2024	Nepal A.P.F. Club		
National T20 Cup	Afghanistan Cricket Board	2024	Active	2025†	Band-e-Amir Region		

=== East Asia-Pacific ===
National Twenty20 competitions in EAP region
Competition	Organizing body	First	Status	Latest	Current champions	Notes	Ref.
Twenty20 Big Bash	Cricket Australia	2006	Defunct	2010–11	—N/a	6 editions only.	
Men's Super Smash	New Zealand Cricket	2006	Active	2024–25	Central Stags		
Women's Super Smash	New Zealand Cricket	2007–08	Active	2024–25	Wellington Blaze		
Australian Women's Twenty20 Cup	Cricket Australia	2009–10	Defunct	2014–15	—N/a	6 editions only.	
Top End T20 Series	Cricket Australia	2022	Active	2025	Perth Scorchers		

=== Europe ===
National Twenty20 competitions in Europe region
Competition	Organizing body	First	Status	Latest	Current champions	Notes	Ref.
T20 Blast	England and Wales Cricket Board	2003	Active	2026	Northamptonshire Steelbacks		
Dutch Twenty20 Cup	Royal Dutch Cricket Association	2007	Active				
Murgitroyd Twenty20	Cricket Scotland	2008	Active	2025	Active		
Women's Twenty20 Cup	England and Wales Cricket Board	2009	Defunct	2024	—N/a		
Inter-Provincial Trophy	Cricket Ireland	2013	Active	2025	Leinster Lightning		
Women's Super Series	Cricket Ireland	2015	Active				
Women's Cricket Super League	England and Wales Cricket Board	2016	Defunct	2019	—N/a		
Regional Pro Series	Cricket Scotland	2016	Defunct	2016	—N/a		
Charlotte Edwards Cup	England and Wales Cricket Board	2021	Defunct	2024	—N/a		
Women's T20 County Cup	England and Wales Cricket Board	2025	Active	2025	Lancashire		
Women's T20 Blast	England and Wales Cricket Board	2025	Active	2025	Surrey		

== Domestic regional competitions ==
=== Bangladesh ===
Domestic regional Twenty20 competitions in Bangladesh
Competition	First	Status	Latest	Ref.
Dhaka Premier Division Twenty20 Cricket League	2018–19	Defunct	2021	

=== India ===
Domestic regional Twenty20 competitions in India
Competition	First	Status	Latest	Ref.
Karnataka Premier League	2009–10	Defunct	2019	
Kashmir Premier League	2011	Defunct	2021	
Tamil Nadu Premier League	2016	Active	2026	
T20 Mumbai League	2018	Active	2026	
Andhra Premier League	2022	Active	2026	
Maharaja Trophy KSCA T20	2022	Active	2026	
Rajasthan Premier League	2023	Defunct	2023	
Bengal Pro T20 League	2024	Active	2026	
Delhi Premier League T20	2024	Active	2025	

=== Pakistan ===
Domestic regional Twenty20 competitions in Pakistan
Competition	First	Status	Latest	Ref.
Kashmir Premier League	2021	Defunct	2022	
