= Sport in Belgium =

Sport in Belgium plays a prominent role in the society. As of 2010, Belgium counted around 17,000 sport clubs with approximately 1.35 million members, or about 13% of the Belgian population. Popular sports in Belgium are, among others: football, cycling, tennis, table tennis, athletics, swimming, basketball, badminton, judo, hockey, rowing, motocross, auto racing, volleyball, and running. Belgium has organized the 1920 Olympic Games in Antwerp as well as the 1972 UEFA European Championship and the 2000 UEFA European Championship along with the Netherlands. The Belgium national football team's best result was a 3rd place at the 2018 FIFA World Cup and a second place of the 1980 UEFA European Championship. Belgian football clubs have won 3 times the UEFA Cup Winners' Cup and twice the UEFA Cup, plus 3 times the UEFA Supercup.

Belgium has won 44 gold medals at Summer Olympic Games as well as 2 at Winter Olympic Games for figure skating at the 1948 Winter Olympics in St. Moritz and speed skating at the 2022 Winter Olympics in Beijing. Among the 44 gold medals at the Summer Olympics, 11 medals were won in archery, seven in cycling, six in athletics, five in equestrian, three in fencing and two each in sailing and judo. Well-known Belgian Olympic champions are Hubert Van Innis and Edmond Cloetens (archery), Gaston Roelants and Tia Hellebaut (athletics), Patrick Sercu and Roger Ilegems (track cycling), Robert Van de Walle and Ulla Werbrouck (judo), Bart Swings (speed skating), Frédérik Deburghgraeve (swimming), and Justine Henin (tennis).

Other well-known Belgian sport champions are Roger Moens, Ivo Van Damme and Kim Gevaert (athletics), Bart Veldkamp (speed skating), Ingrid Lempereur (swimming), Gella Vandecaveye, Heidi Rakels and Harry Van Barneveld (judo), Eddy Merckx, Rik Van Looy, Roger De Vlaeminck, Lucien Van Impe, Johan Bruyneel, Johan Museeuw, Axel Merckx and Tom Boonen (cycling), Raymond Ceulemans (three-cushion billiards), Jacky Ickx and Thierry Boutsen (Formula One), Stefan Everts and Gaston Rahier (motocross) and Jean-Michel Saive (table tennis), Kim Clijsters (tennis), Sven Nys (cyclo-cross) and Vincent Rousseau (running). In team sports, well-known footballers include Jean-Marie Pfaff, Eric Gerets, Enzo Scifo, Michel Preud'homme, Franky Van Der Elst, Luc Nilis and Jan Ceulemans and well-known basketball players include Ann Wauters, Éric Struelens, Axel Hervelle and D. J. Mbenga. Former International Olympic Committee president Count Jacques Rogge is a Belgian.

As a sub-area of culture in Belgium, sport is now considered to fall under the responsibility of the 3 Belgian communities (the Dutch-speaking Community, the French-speaking Community and the German-speaking Community). With the exception of football and field hockey, all other major sport federations in Belgium are split into 2 major federations (a French-speaking federation and a Dutch-speaking federation).

== Football ==
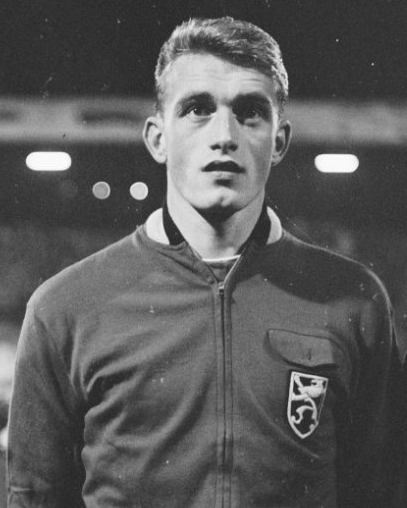
Paul Van Himst is often viewed as the greatest Belgian player of all-time.

The Belgian Football Association, the governing body of football in Belgium, was founded in 1895 and was one of the founding members of the FIFA in 1904. The first Belgian championship was held in 1895 among the 10 founding teams of the Belgian Football Association, and was won by RFC de Liège. A second level was added to the Belgian league in 1905, a third level in 1926 and a fourth one in 1952. As of 2026, R.S.C. Anderlecht is the most successful Belgian team both at national (34 Belgian champion titles) and international (5 European titles) levels. Other successful clubs include Club Brugge K.V. (20 Belgian champion titles), R. Union Saint-Gilloise (12 national titles), Standard Liège (10 national titles) and K.V. Mechelen (4 national titles and 2 European titles). The club with the most Belgian Cup titles is Club Brugge KV (12) followed by RSC Anderlecht (9) and R Standard Liège (8). The 7 European titles won by Belgian clubs were claimed between 1976 and 1988.

The Belgium national team played its first game in 1904 against France. The match ended in a 3–3 draw. Since then, Belgium has qualified for 12 out of 20 World Cups, finishing 3rd in 2018, and for 4 out of the 12 UEFA European Football Championships in which it entered, finishing second in 1980. At the Summer Olympics, Belgium won the gold medal in 1920 and secured a fourth place in 2008.

The most capped player for Belgium is Jan Vertonghen (157 caps), followed by Axel Witsel (136 caps) and Romelu Lukaku (128 caps). Belgium all-time topscorer is Romelu Lukaku with 89 goals. Other past famous players include goalkeepers Jean-Marie Pfaff, Michel Preud'homme and others outfield players like: Armand Swartenbroeks, Raymond Braine, Jef Mermans, Rik Coppens, Jef Jurion, Georges Heylens, Paul Van Himst, Eric Gerets, Jan Ceulemans, Enzo Scifo and Luc Nilis. Current well-known Belgian players are Eden Hazard, Thibaut Courtois, Vincent Kompany, Kevin De Bruyne and Dries Mertens. In addition to female footballers: Janice Cayman, Tessa Wullaert and Tine De Caigny.

== Cricket ==
Cricket in Belgium is organized by the Belgian Cricket Federation (branded as Cricket Belgium), which was founded in 1990 and became an associate member of the International Cricket Council (ICC) in 2005. The Belgium national cricket team played its first international match in 1905 against the Netherlands. Their best performance in European competition was winning the ICC European T20 Championship Division 2 undefeated in 2011. In Twenty20 International (T20I) cricket, Belgium reached a peak world ranking of 37th in May 2023. The team's record includes a notable 2–1 series win over Austria in 2021. The Belgium women's national cricket team also represents the country in international fixtures, primarily within the European region.

The Belgian Cricket League is the premier domestic structure, featuring over 18 member clubs. Historically, the Royal Brussels Cricket Club and Antwerp Cricket Club have been among the most prominent and successful clubs, with the former's ground in Waterloo serving as a frequent venue for international matches.

In 2025, the federation partnered with Destino Legends Sports LLC to launch the EUT20 Belgium, a professional franchise league featuring six teams from cities including Antwerp, Bruges, Brussels, Ghent, Leuven, and Liege.

The inaugural EUT20 season, scheduled for May 2026, will attract global stars such as Wanindu Hasaranga, Angelo Mathews, and Rassie van der Dussen. Former England captain Eoin Morgan serves as the league's global brand ambassador. To ensure local development, the league mandates a (2 - 4 - 4 - 6) model, requiring at least two Belgian players in every starting XI.

== Cycling ==
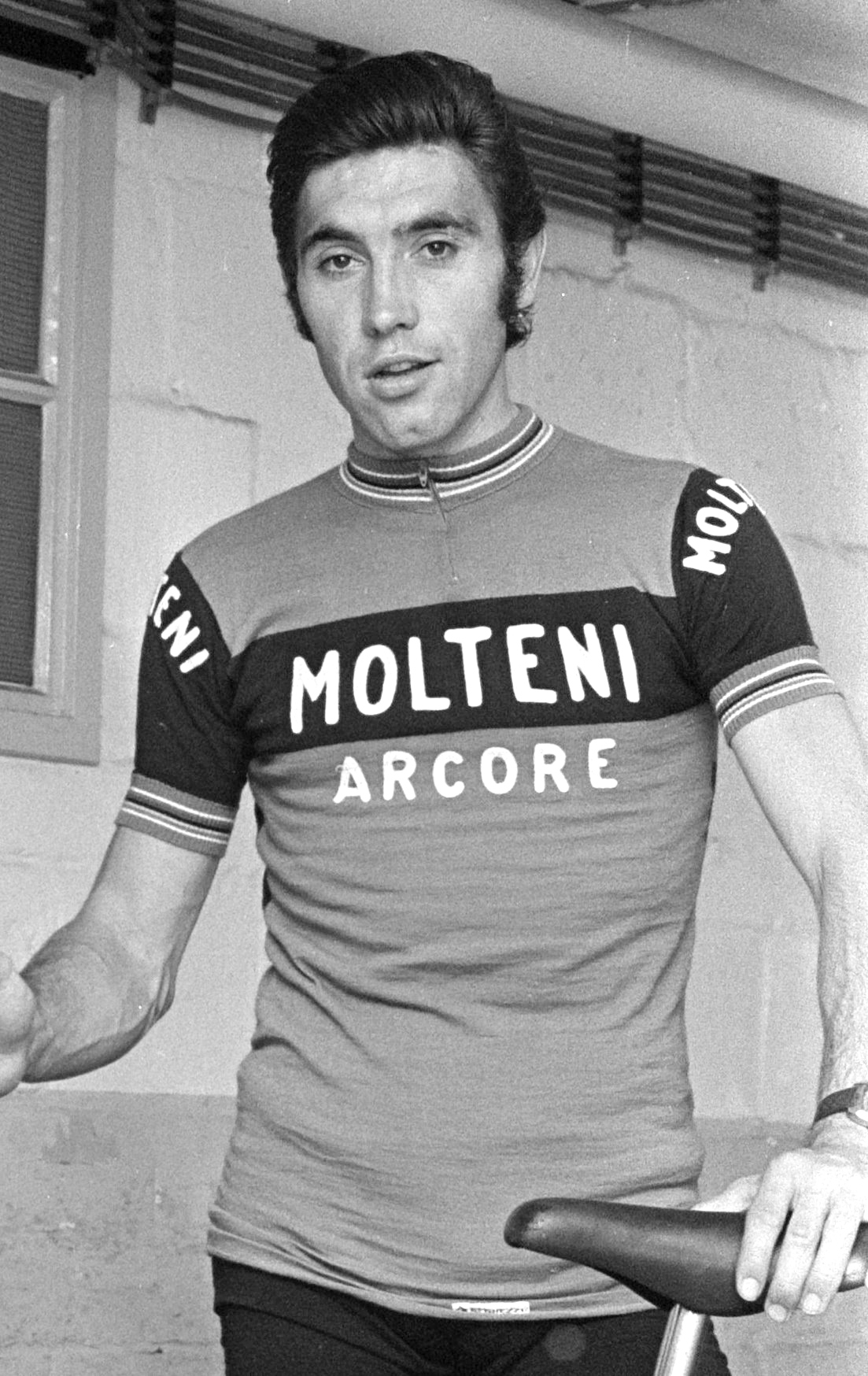
Eddy Merckx, widely regarded as one of the greatest cyclists of all time

Cycling is a very popular sport in Belgium. It is governed by the Royal Belgian Cycling League, which is split between the Dutch-speaking WBV and the French-speaking FCWB. Many Belgian cyclists have been successful, and some of the greatest cycle races take place in Belgium, especially in road bicycle racing, though other bicycle racing disciplines such as mountain bike racing or track cycling also count a number of Belgian champions and races. The best Belgian cyclist of all time, Eddy Merckx, nicknamed the Cannibal, won the Tour de France and Giro d'Italia 5 times each, won the Vuelta a España once, the UCI Road World Championship 3 times, had many classic cycle race wins and set the hour record, among other achievements. Belgium has been one of the most successful countries in road cycling since the origins of the sport, with one of the oldest races being held in Belgium, Liège–Bastogne–Liège, which was first held in 1892.

At the Olympic Games, Belgium has won four gold medals for road cycling, with two victories for the Belgian men's team in the team time trial (at the 1948 and 1952 Summer Olympics) and two for André Noyelle and Greg Van Avermaet for the individual race. Belgium has had the most World Championship gold medals (25) with 3 victories by Rik Van Steenbergen and Eddy Merckx and 2 by Georges Ronsse, Briek Schotte, Rik Van Looy and Freddy Maertens. Belgian cyclists have also performed very well in the 3 grand tours. Ten cyclists have won the Tour de France 18 times between them, making of Belgium the country with the most Tour de France wins behind France. Besides Eddy Merckx, Philippe Thys won the most prestigious tour 3 times while Firmin Lambot and Sylvère Maes won it twice. The last Belgian winner at the Tour de France however was Lucien Van Impe in 1976. At the Giro d'Italia, Belgium has had 7 wins, being the second most successful country in terms of wins after Italy. Michel Pollentier and Johan De Muynck (the most recent Belgian to win the Giro in 1978) are with Eddy Merckx the 3 Belgian winners of this tour. Belgium also has had 7 wins at the Vuelta a España, with 2 wins by Gustaaf Deloor, the first winner of the race in 1935 and 1936. The last Belgian winner of the Spanish tour was Remco Evenepoel in 2022.

Many Belgian cyclists have won one of the five monument cycle races. At the Tour of Flanders, Belgium counts 68 wins in 96 editions with 3 wins for Achiel Buysse, Eric Leman, Johan Museeuw and Tom Boonen. Roger De Vlaeminck holds the record of wins at Paris–Roubaix together with Tom Boonen (4), and Belgium is the most successful country in this race with 55 wins in 110 editions. Liège–Bastogne–Liège has been won 59 times out of 98 by Belgian cyclists. Eddy Merckx holds the record of the most individual wins (5). At the Giro di Lombardia, Belgium counts 12 titles in 105 editions, with only Italy performing better. Milan–San Remo was won 7 times by Eddy Merckx, who holds the record of the most wins, and Belgium has won 20 times out of 103, being the second most successful country after Italy in this race. Unlike the grand tours, which have not been won by a Belgian since 1978, cyclists from Belgium are still successful in the monument races. At Paris–Roubaix, Tom Boonen has won 4 times and Johan Museeuw 3 times since 1996, and Peter Van Petegem and Johan Van Summeren have also won the race once each. At the Tour of Flanders, Belgium has 12 wins since 1993, with 3 by Johan Museeuw and Tom Boonen, 2 by Peter Van Petegem and Stijn Devolder and 1 by Andreï Tchmil and Nick Nuyens. In the other 3 monuments, Belgians has been less successful recently, with Andreï Tchmil being the only Belgian winner of Milan–San Remo (in 1999) since Fons De Wolf in 1981. Philippe Gilbert has been the only Belgian winner of the Giro di Lombardia since Fons De Wolf in 1980, with wins in 2009 and 2010 and only 4 Belgians have won Liège–Bastogne–Liège since Joseph Bruyère in 1978: Eric Van Lancker in 1990, Dirk De Wolf in 1992, Frank Vandenbroucke in 1999 and Philippe Gilbert in 2011.

Among the best-known road races in Belgium are two out of the five monuments of cycling: the Tour of Flanders and Liège–Bastogne–Liège. Other classic one day races in Belgium include La Flèche Wallonne, E3 Harelbeke and Gent–Wevelgem, all part of the UCI World Tour, as well as Paris–Brussels, Omloop Het Nieuwsblad, Kuurne–Brussels–Kuurne, Grand Prix de Wallonie and Dwars door Vlaanderen. The best-known stage-races in Belgium are the Tour of Benelux, created in 2005, the Tour of Belgium and the Tour of Wallonie. Belgium has currently two professional cycling teams competing in the UCI ProTour: Etixx–Quick-Step and Lotto–Soudal.

In mountain biking, Filip Meirhaeghe won the 2002 UCI Mountain Bike World Cup and the 2003 UCI Mountain Bike & Trials World Championships and was a silver medalist at the 2000 Summer Olympics. In mountain bike trials, Kenny Belaey has won the 26-inch wheel trial World Cup in 2002, 2005 and 2006. In cyclo-cross, Belgian competitors have gained 25 gold medals at the UCI Cyclo-cross Men World Championships since 1950 and 54 medals overall, making it the best country in cyclo-cross, ahead of France with 10 golds out of 34 medals. Erik De Vlaeminck has the most world titles in cyclo-cross with 7 World Cup wins between 1966 and 1973. Other multiple Belgian world champions are Roland Liboton (4 titles), Mario De Clercq (3), Wout van Aert (3), Erwin Vervecken (3), Sven Nys (2), and Bart Wellens (2). In track cycling, Matthew Gilmore and Etienne De Wilde won the gold medal in the Men's Madison event at the 1998 UCI Track Cycling World Championships and the silver medal in the Men's Madison at the 2000 Summer Olympics. Roger Ilegems won the gold medal of the Men's points race at the 1984 Summer Olympics while Patrick Sercu held several world records and won the gold medal of the Men's 1 km time trial at the 1964 Summer Olympics.

== Field hockey ==
Field hockey has grown in importance over the recent years. As of April 2019 the national team for men is ranked first in the world, while the national team for women is ranked thirteenth.

== Tennis ==
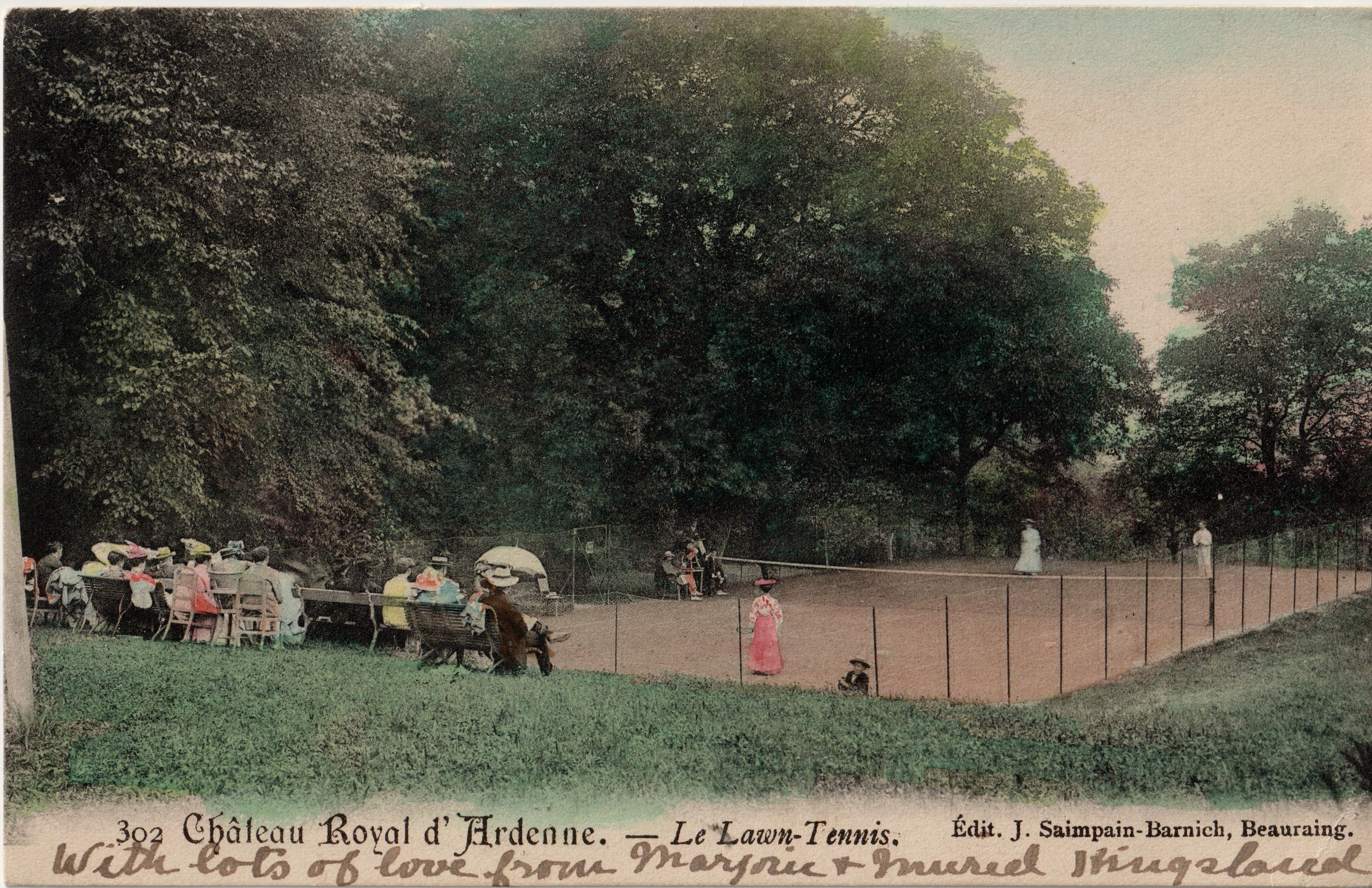
Tennis being played at the Royal Château of Ardenne, about 1905

Tennis in Belgium is governed by the Royal Belgian Tennis Federation, which is split into the French-speaking AFT and the Dutch-speaking VTV. Belgium is well known in tennis for the two champions Justine Henin and Kim Clijsters, who were both WTA World No. 1 ranked player in the 2000s. Both players also retired respectively in 2007 and 2008, before they came back to the competition respectively in 2009 and 2010. Clijsters won 41 WTA titles, including three US Open titles and the Australian Open in 2011. Henin won 43 WTA titles, including seven Grand Slam titles (four French Open titles, two US Open titles and the 2004 Australian Open), and a gold medal at the 2004 Summer Olympics.

The Belgium team won the 2001 Fed Cup and finished runner-up in 2006. The current Fed Cup team for Belgium is composed of Kim Clijsters, Yanina Wickmayer, Kirsten Flipkens, Alison Van Uytvanck, and An-Sophie Mestach. Belgium hosted each year the Belgian Open from 1987 on, which was replaced by the Proximus Diamond Games in 2002.

The men's team of Belgium is currently 4th in the ITF rankings. Their best results are second places in the 1904 International Lawn Tennis Challenge and the 2015 Davis Cup. The current Belgium Davis Cup team is composed of Xavier Malisse (3 ATP titles), Olivier Rochus (2), Steve Darcis (2) and David Goffin (4).

Former Belgian tennis champions include Filip Dewulf (2 ATP titles), Christophe Rochus, Sabine Appelmans (7 WTA titles) and Dominique Monami (4 WTA titles).

== Athletics ==
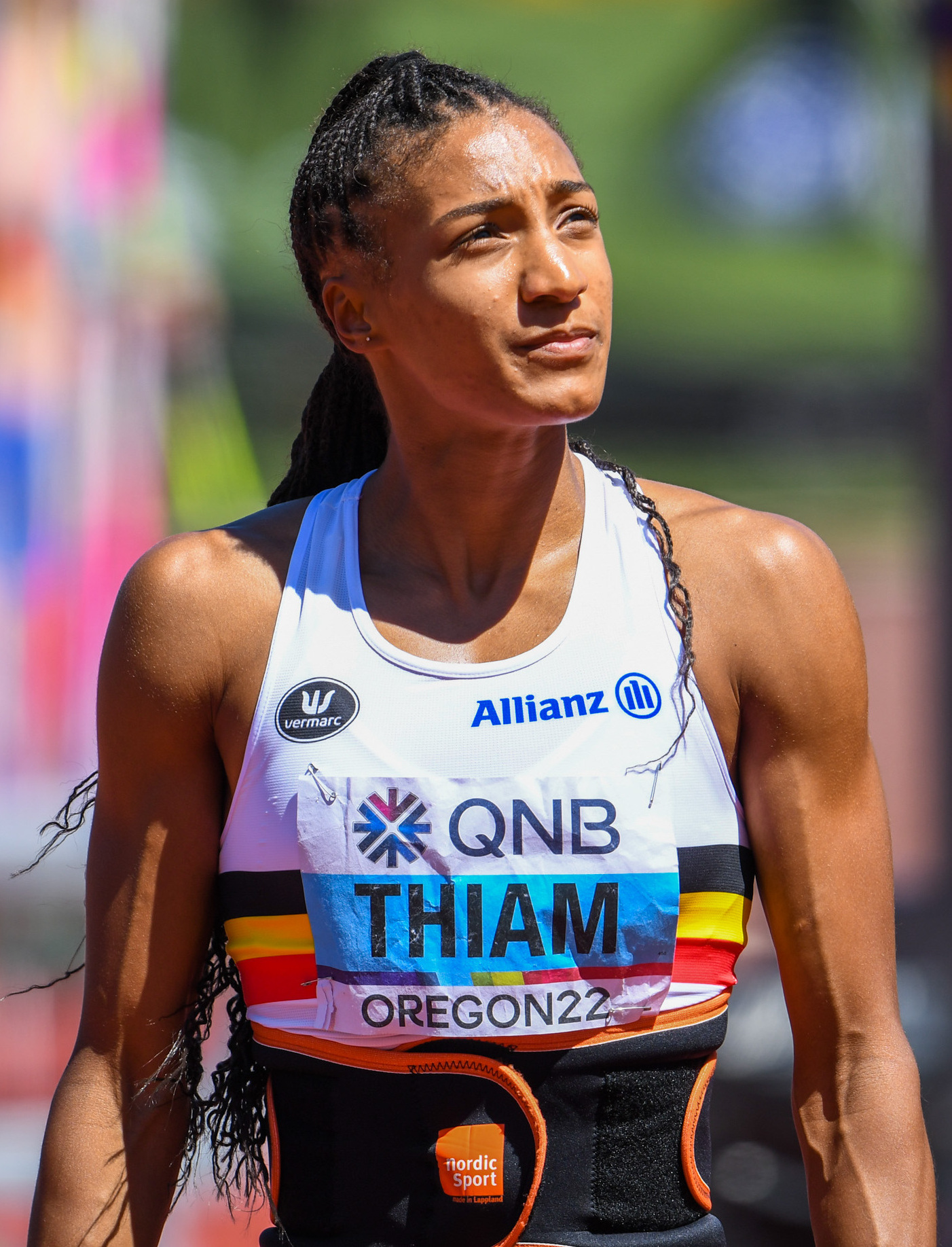
Nafissatou Thiam in 2022

Athletics in Belgium is governed by three major bodies: the Royal Belgian Athletics League (the Belgian federal association), the Flemish Athletics Liga (Dutch: Vlaamse Atletiekliga, the Flemish association), and the Ligue Belge Francophone d'Athlétisme (the French-speaking association). Belgium has hosted a number of major athletics events, beginning with the 1950 European Athletics Championships. It has since hosted the IAAF World Cross Country Championships in 1973, 1991, 2001 and 2004, the IAAF World Half Marathon Championships in 1993 and 2002 and the 2000 European Athletics Indoor Championships (at the Flanders Sports Arena).

Belgium hosts a number of prominent annual competitions across all sections of the sport of athletics. The Memorial Van Damme, Belgium's foremost track and field competition, began in 1977 and is now part of the IAAF Diamond League circuit. Two of the meetings in the Lotto Cross Cup (an annual cross country running series) are sanctioned by the IAAF and European Athletics. Other significant competitions which are part of the European athletics circuit include the Flanders Indoor meeting in Ghent and the KBC Night of Athletics in Heusden. The country has two AIMS-certified marathons: the Antwerp Marathon and the Brussels Marathon. There is also an annual ultramarathon competition called the Nacht van Vlaanderen, a 100 km race which has been held annually since 1980. The meeting has also doubled as the European and IAU World Championships on a number of occasions. Other annual races of note are the Warandeloop, Oostende-Brugge Ten Miles, Kust Marathon, Guldensporenmarathon and the 20 km of Brussels.

Four Belgian athletes have won Olympic gold medals: Nafissatou Thiam (heptathlon, 2016), Tia Hellebaut (high jump, 2008), Gaston Roelants (3000 m steeplechase, 1964) and Gaston Reiff (5000 m, 1948). The other Belgian Olympic medalists in athletics are Etienne Gailly (bronze for marathon in 1948), Roger Moens (silver for 800m in 1960), Emiel Puttemans (silver for 10,000 m in 1972), Karel Lismont (silver for marathon in 1972 and bronze in 1976), Ivo Van Damme (silver for 800 m and 1500 m in 1976) and the Belgium Women's 4 × 100 m led by Kim Gevaert (silver in 2008).

Belgium has had three IAAF World Championships in Athletics medals (all bronze medals) since the creation of this competition in 1983: William Van Dijck for 3000 m steeplechase in 1987, Mohammed Mourhit for the 5000m in 1999 and the Belgium Women's 4 × 100 m team in 2007.

Over the history of the European Athletics Championship, Belgium has had five gold medals, ten silver medals and seven bronze medals. The Golden Spike is awarded annually to the season's best Belgian male and female athletes.

== Basketball ==
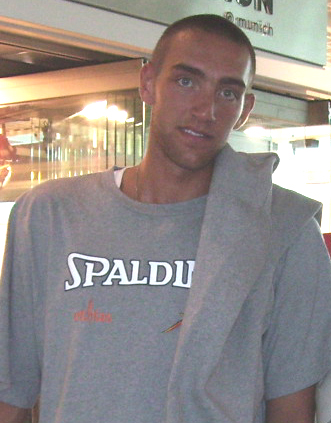
Axel Hervelle, the face of Belgium's basketball team for almost a decade

Basketball is governed by the Royal Belgian Basketball Federation. Their last tournament was the EuroBasket 2013 in Slovenia, where they won three games. The best result of the Belgium national team was a 4th place at the EuroBasket 1947. The Basketball League Belgium is the top-flight national division and is played between 8 teams, with the current major clubs being BC Oostende (12 Belgian champion titles and 11 Belgian Cups), Antwerp Giants (9 national titles and 5 Belgian Cups), Spirou Basket Charleroi (8 national titles and 5 Belgian Cups), Liège Basket (3 national titles and 4 Belgian Cups), Mons-Hainaut (1 Belgian Cup) and Verviers-Pepinster. The clubs of Racing Mechelen (15 national titles and 9 Belgian Cups between 1964 and 1994), Royal IV Brussels (7 national titles and 5 Belgian Cups between 1939 and 1973) and Semailles (6 national titles and 4 Belgian Cups between 1946 and 1958) have been successful but are now defunct. Belgium has organized the EuroBasket 1977. The biggest venues for basketball in Belgium are the Spiroudome in Charleroi (7,560 seats), the Country Hall Ethias Liège in Liège (5,600), the Lotto Arena in Antwerp (5,218) and the Sea'Arena in Ostend (5,000).

Belgian Cats have gone from unranked FIBA nation in 2016 into a winning team consistently. Claiming both their 2023 and 2025 titles despite trailing at half-time in both finals, making them only the third nation after the Soviet Union and Spain to successfully defend the EuroBasket Women crown.

Belgium has become a competitive team on the global stage since first time appearance in 2018 FIBA Women's Basketball World Cup with 4th-place finish. Four years later they competed in 2022 edition.). They earned the entry ticket into historic Olympics participation in 2020 edition. They qualified into semifinals of 2024 Paris Olympics.

Belgium will be the co-host for the EuroBasket Women 2027 along with Finland, Sweden and Lithuania.

== Table tennis ==
Table tennis in Belgium is governed by the Royal Belgian Table Tennis Federation, which is split into the French-speaking AFFRBTT and the Dutch-speaking VTTL. The probably best-known Belgian table tennis player is Jean-Michel Saive who won his 21st Belgian champion title in 2009. At the international level, a victory at the 1994 Table Tennis European Championships, a victory in the Europe Top-12 in 1994 and a 2nd place at the World Table Tennis Championships in 1993 are his best single results. Jean-Michel also finished 2nd at the team event of the World Championships in 2001. His brother Philippe Saive was also a renowned player in Belgium. At the club level, the best known Belgian club is certainly Royal Villette Charleroi where the brothers Saive have played, as well as Zoran Primorac, Petr Korbel, Dimitrij Ovtcharov, Oh Sang-Eun and Vladimir Samsonov among others. La Villette Charleroi has won 1 World Champion title and 7 European Club Cup of Champions since 1994, among which 5 victories in the new European Champions League, making it the most successful club in this competition.

== Volleyball ==
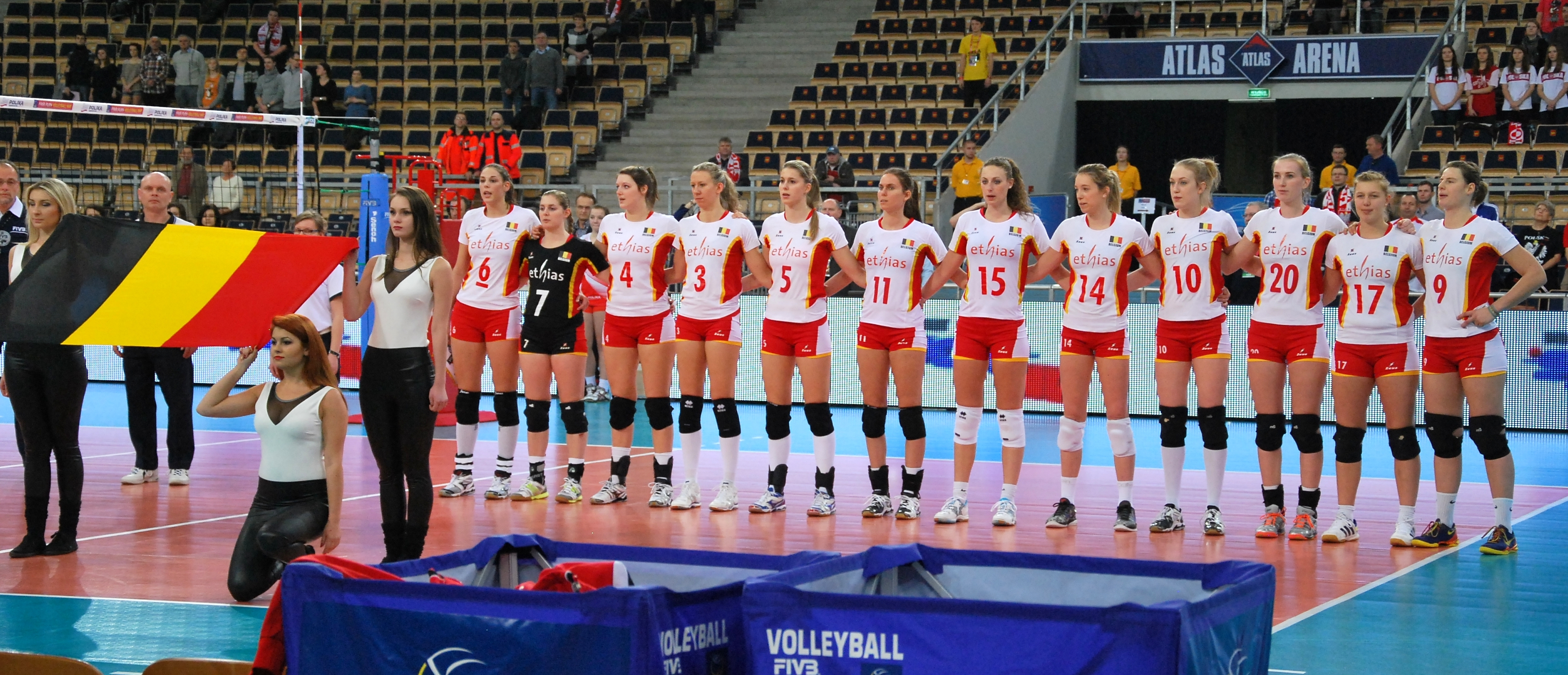
Belgium volleyball women national team

Volleyball in Belgium is organized by the Royal Belgian Volleyball Federation which is split into the Dutch-speaking VVB and the French-speaking AIF. The Belgium men's national volleyball team best result at the European Volleyball Championship was in 2017 (4th on 16) after they lost the bronze medal game against Serbia (2–3). In 1987, Belgium finished 7th. Since then, Belgium only reached the finals in 2007 and finished 10th. The Belgium women's national volleyball team best result is a 7th place at the 2007 Women's European Volleyball Championship.

The Belgium men's volleyball League is the highest level championship for men's clubs in Belgium. Noliko Maaseik (12 national titles and 11 Belgian Cups) and Knack Randstad Roeselare (5 national titles and 6 Belgian Cups) are the most successful clubs in the last years. Roeselare is the only Belgian club to have won a European cup, namely the CEV Top Teams Cup in 2002. They also have 2 second places at the Challenge Cup. Maaseik best results at international level are 2 lost finals of the CEV Champions League in 1997 and 1999 and a lost final of the CEV Top Teams Cup in 2008.

In the Belgium women's volleyball Division of Honour, the most successful clubs in the last years are Datovoc Tongeren (7 national titles), Asterix Kieldrecht (4 national titles) and Dauphines Charleroi (2 national titles). Kieldrecht is the only club to have a European title (the 2001 Women's CEV Top Teams Cup).

Belgium featured a men's national team in beach volleyball that competed at the 2018–2020 CEV Beach Volleyball Continental Cup.

== Rugby union ==
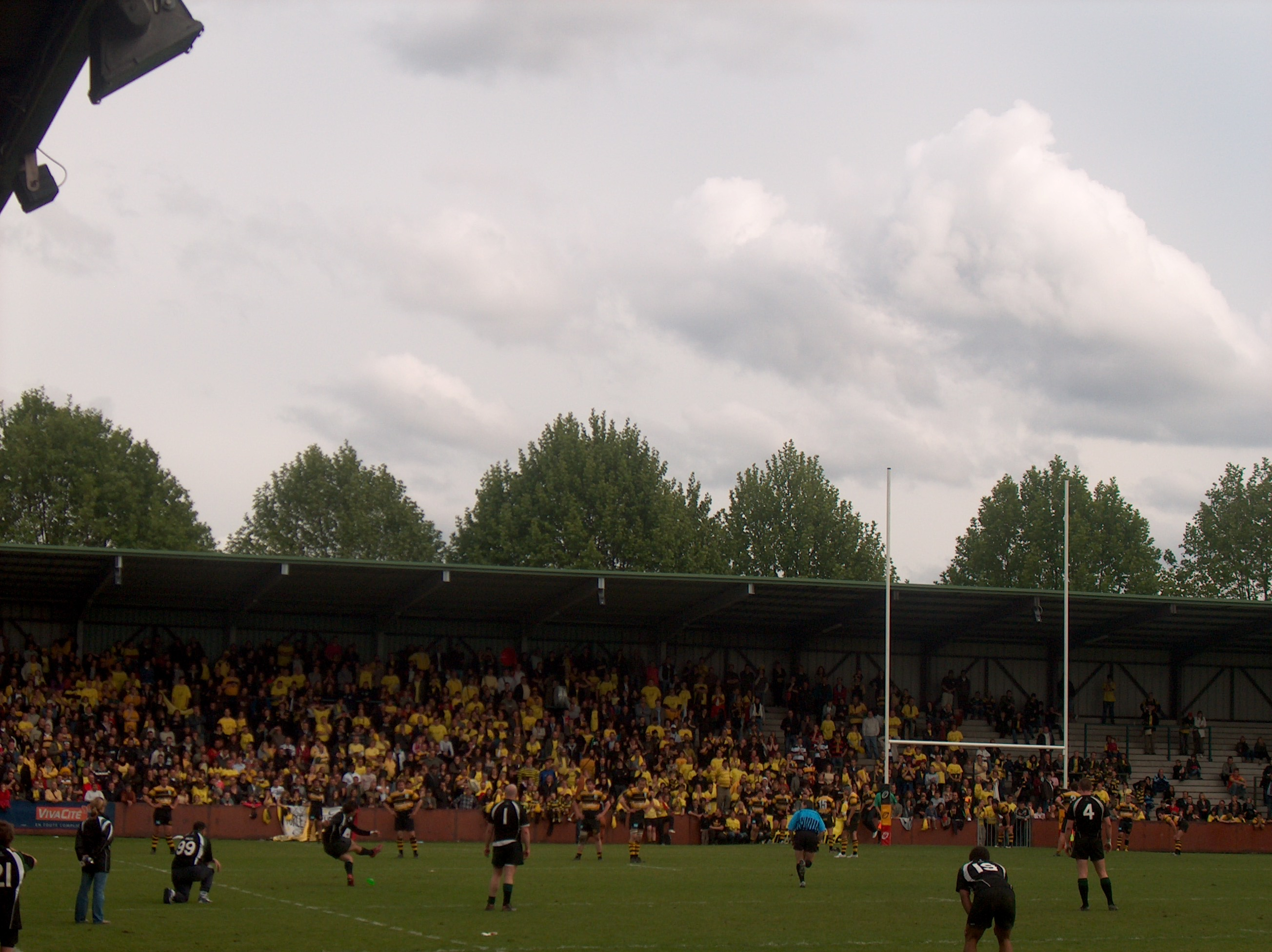
Romain Orban of Kituro Rugby Club scores the winning conversion in the last second of the final of the Belgian Rugby Championship, 2009

Rugby union is a growing sport in Belgium which, due to the growing mediatisation around the sport, especially during the 2003 and 2007 World Cup, is enjoying a rise in popularity. The game is formally organised by the Belgium Rugby Federation and has a surprisingly long history. Belgium has 57 clubs and 10,071 players according to the International Rugby Board who currently rank Belgium as tier two nation ranked at twenty-sixth in the world.

== Rally ==
Rally is popular sport in Belgium and although no money prizes can be won, many talented drivers participate in the Belgian Championships. The rally sport is overseen by the RACB organization. Belgium is known for its technical special stages on narrow tarmac roads and steep ditches.

Belgium was part of the FIA World Rally Championship in both 2021 and 2022.

Known drivers include Bruno Thirry, Freddy Loix, Thierry Neuville and Lyssia Baudet - the latter who made it to the final of the FIA's Beyond Rally Women's Driver Development Programme. Known co-drivers include Sven Smeets, Stephen Prevot and Martijn Wydaeghe.
