= Chris Conroy (politician) =

American politician

Member-elect of the New Hampshire House of Representatives from the Hillsborough 44th district
- Assuming office December 2026
- Succeeding: Ross Berry

Personal details
- Party: Democratic

Chris Conroy is an American politician. A member of the Democratic Party, he is the member-elect for the Hillsborough 44th district of the New Hampshire House of Representatives.
