= EUT20 Belgium =

Professional T20 cricket league in Belgium

- Countries: Belgium
- Administrator: Belgian Cricket Federation; Destino Legends Sports LLC
- Headquarters: Brussels, Belgium
- Format: Twenty20
- First edition: 2026
- Latest edition: 2026
- Next edition: 2027
- Tournament format: Single round-robin, Playoff league and final
- Number of teams: 6
- Current champion: Ghent Gladiators
- Most successful: Ghent Gladiators (1 title)
- Most runs: Josh Brown (229)
- Most wickets: Tristan Luus (10)
- TV: List of broadcasters
- Website: eu-t20.com

The EUT20 Belgium is a professional Twenty20 cricket league in Belgium, organised by Destino Legends Sports LLC in partnership with Belgian Cricket Federation. Established in 2025, the league was created to professionalize the sport in mainland Europe and provide a high-performance platform for local Belgian talent to compete alongside global international stars.

The league features six franchise teams representing major Belgian cities and towns. The inaugural season took place in Brussels from 6 to 14 June 2026, where Ghent Gladiators defeated Antwerp Anchors by 3 wickets to win the inaugural title. JJ Smit of the Antwerp Anchors was named player of the tournament in the inaugural season.

== History ==
In October 2025, following the success of franchise models globally, Cricket Belgium signed a long-term agreement with Destino Legends Sports LLC to launch a premier franchise competition.

Unlike previous domestic tournaments, EUT20 was designed as a hub for European cricket, utilizing Belgium's central geographic location to attract players from both Full Member and Associate nations. Former England World Cup-winning captain Eoin Morgan was appointed as the Global Brand Ambassador to provide international credibility and strategic oversight.

Cricket in Belgium has historically been an Associate-level sport with a growing grassroots base. The league's primary mission is the (2 - 4 - 4 - 6) development model, which mandates the inclusion of local Belgian players in every starting XI to ensure the long-term growth of the Belgium national cricket team.

=== Foundation of EUT20 Belgium ===
In late 2025, the league invited international investors for franchise ownership. Six cities were originally selected based on their sporting infrastructure and local cricket communities: Antwerp, Bruges, Brussels, Ghent, Leuven, and Liège. However, one of the originally planned franchise team from Leuven was not announced by EUT20 Belgium and did not participate in the player draft held on 24 March 2026, which left the inaugural tournament to be played with five teams. The league later announced that a new franchise based in the town of Waterloo, named Royal Belge Waterloo, would join the competition from the 2027 season as the replacement for the vacant sixth slot originally intended for Leuven.

== Tournament format ==
The EUT20 Belgium follows a franchise T20 format:

- League stage: A single round-robin format in which the five teams play each other once, resulting in a total of 10 matches. After the league stage, the teams placed fourth and fifth play an additional classification match to determine the final participant for the next stage.
- Playoff league: The top three teams from the league stage, along with the winner of the fourth and fifth classification match, advance to the Playoff league, while the losing team is eliminated. The Playoff league is played in a single round-robin format, in which each team plays the other three once, resulting in a total of 6 matches. The top two teams in the Playoff league points table qualify for the final, while the remaining two teams are eliminated.
- Final: The top two teams from the Playoff league compete in the final to determine the champion of the tournament.

== Player acquisition ==
Teams acquire players through a centralized player draft. Each 18-member squad must follow strict roster requirements:

- Domestic: 4 Belgian players (Minimum 2 in the starting XI).
- Associate: 4 players from ICC Associate nations.
- International: 4 active Full Member international players.
- Veterans: 6 Full Member players who have not played international cricket in the last two years.

== Teams ==
The league features six franchises representing major urban centers and historic municipalities across Belgium.

Team	Debut	Captain	Head coach	Owner(s)	Ref.
Akcel United Brussels	2026	Rilee Rossouw	Mark Boucher	Akcel Group	
Antwerp Anchors	2026	Martin Guptill	Donovan Miller	Anchor Sports & Zaheer Khan	
Ghent Gladiators	2026	Temba Bavuma	Jonathan Trott	TraWenture LLC, Haspex Co WLL & Irfan Pathan	
JB Bruges	2026	Wayne Parnell	Shivnarine Chanderpaul	Dream Sports	
Liège Red Lions	2026	Faf du Plessis	Herschelle Gibbs	Tez Sports & US Consortium	
Royal Belge Waterloo	2027	TBA	TBA	TBA	

== Finals ==
Season	Final				Player of the season
Season	Winner	Result	Runner-up	Venue	Player of the season
2026	Ghent Gladiators; 181/7 (19.5 overs)	Ghent Gladiators won by 3 wickets Scorecard	Antwerp Anchors; 178/6 (20 overs)	Stars Arena, Zemst	JJ Smit (Antwerp Anchors)

== Performance by team ==
=== Seasons ===
Season (No. of teams)	2026 (5)	2027 (6)
Akcel United Brussels	PL	TBD
Antwerp Anchors	RU	TBD
Ghent Gladiators	C	TBD
JB Bruges	PL	TBD
Liège Red Lions	GS	TBD
Royal Belge Waterloo	—N/a	TBD

- Teams have been listed alphabetically.
- C: Champions
- RU: Runner-up
- PL: Teams that qualified for the play-off league of the competition.
- GS: Teams that only played in the group stage and didn't qualify for the next round of the competition.

=== All time standings ===
Teams	Appearances			Best result	Statistics						
Teams	Total	First	Latest	Best result	Played	Won	Lost	Tied+W	Tied+L	NR	Win%
Ghent Gladiators	1	2026	2026	Champions (2026)	8	2	1	0	0	5	66.67%
Antwerp Anchors	1	2026	2026	Runners-up (2026)	8	2	3	1	0	2	50.00%
Akcel United Brussels	1	2026	2026	Playoff league (2026)	7	3	1	0	0	3	75.00%
JB Bruges	1	2026	2026	Playoff league (2026)	7	2	2	0	1	2	40.00%
Liège Red Lions	1	2026	2026	Group Stage (2026)	4	0	2	0	0	2	0.00%

== Media and broadcasting ==
The 2026 season of the EUT20 Belgium was broadcast live on the following channels:

Country	Television Rights	Streaming Rights
Nepal	Sony Sports; Kantipur Max	Kantipur Max (YouTube)
India	Sony Sports	FanCode
Middle East and North Africa	None	Sportvot
Southeast Asia	None	Sportvot
New Zealand	None	Sportvot
United States and Canada	Willow TV	Willow TV (YouTube)
Rest of the World	Sony Sports	Willow TV (YouTube)

== See also ==
- European T20 Premier League
- 2026 EUT20 Belgium
- Belgium national cricket team
- Belgium women's national cricket team
- Cricket Belgium
- European Cricket League
- Nepal Premier League
- Global T20 Canada
