= Safir Hayat =

Pakistani-born Norwegian cricketer (born 1981)

Personal information
- Born: 15 September 1981 (age 45); Kharian, Pakistan

International information
- National side: Norway
- Source: ESPNcricinfo, 18 May 2016

Safir Hayat (born 15 September 1981) is a Pakistani-born Norwegian cricketer who played in the 2015 ICC World Cricket League Division Six tournament.
