= Ross Berry =

American politician

Member of the New Hampshire House of Representatives
- Incumbent
- Assumed office December 4, 2024
- Succeeded by: Chris Conroy (elect)
- Constituency: Hillsborough 44th

Member of the New Hampshire House of Representatives
- In office December 2, 2020 – May 15, 2024
- Preceded by: Travis Corcoran
- Constituency: Hillsborough 44th (2020–2022); 39th (2022–2024)

Personal details
- Born: December 16, 1989 (age 36) Houston, Texas
- Party: Republican
- Spouse: Samantha (Sammi) Berry
- Children: 2 Children
- Education: Sewanee: The University of the South
- Profession: Self Employed in the Childcare Industry
- Website: Berry for NH

Ross Berry is a New Hampshire politician.

== Early life ==
Berry earned a bachelor's degree.

== Career ==
Berry served as executive director of the New Hampshire Republican State Committee from 2015 to 2017. In 2017, Berry started serving as the president of the company REVT Strategies, LLC, a position he still holds. On November 3, 2020, Berry was elected to the New Hampshire House of Representatives where he represents the Hillsborough 44 district. He assumed office on December 2, 2020.

On May 29, 2023, Berry was named Director of Never Back Down PAC in support of the Ron DeSantis 2024 presidential campaign.

On May 15, 2024, Berry resigned from the New Hampshire House due to a change in residency.

== Personal life ==
Berry resides in Weare, New Hampshire. Berry is married to his wife Samantha (Sammi) Berry.
