= Toby Howe Cricket Ground =

Cricket ground in Billericay, Essex, England

Coordinates: 51.6224°N 0.3997°E

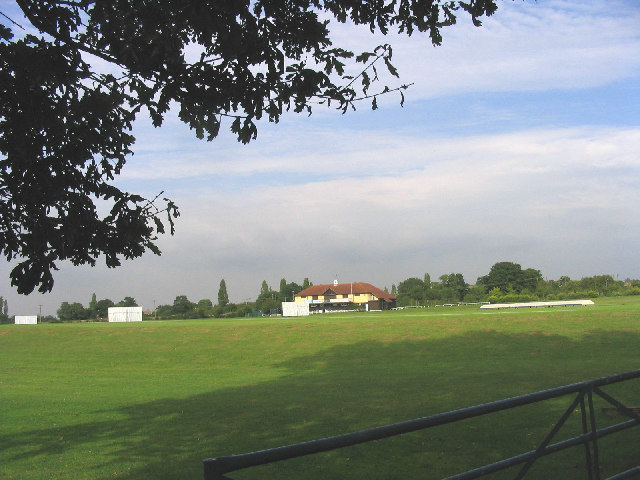
- Interactive map of Toby Howe Cricket Ground

Ground information
- Location: Billericay, Essex
- Country: England
- Establishment: 1999 (first recorded match)

International information
- Only women's T20I: 23 June 2011: Australia v India

Team information
Essex Cricket Board	(2000)
- As of 5 September 2020; Source: Ground profile

Toby Howe Cricket Ground is a cricket ground in Billericay, Essex. The first recorded match on the ground was in 1999, when Billericay Cricket Club played Wanstead Cricket Club in the 1999 Essex Premier League.

In 2000, the ground held a single List-A match between the Essex Cricket Board and Warwickshire in the 3rd round of the 2000 NatWest Trophy.

The ground has also held 21 Second XI fixtures between 1999 and present for the Essex Second XI in the Second XI Championship and Second XI Trophy.

In local domestic cricket, the ground is still the home venue of Billericay Cricket Club. Billericay Cricket Club has produced Paul Walter and Nathan Batson.
