= List of Sweden Twenty20 International cricketers =

This is a list of Swedish Twenty20 International cricketers.

In April 2018, the ICC decided to grant full Twenty20 International (T20I) status to all its members. Therefore, all Twenty20 matches played between Sweden and other ICC members after 1 January 2019 will have T20I status. Sweden played their first T20I against Denmark on 14 August 2021 during a tour of Denmark.

This list comprises all members of the Sweden cricket team who have played at least one T20I match. It is initially arranged in the order in which each player won his first Twenty20 cap. Where more than one player won his first Twenty20 cap in the same match, those players are listed alphabetically by surname.

== Key ==
General

- ‡ – Captain
- † – Wicket-keeper
- First – Year of debut
- Last – Year of latest game
- Mat – Number of matches played

Batting

- Runs – Runs scored in career
- HS – Highest score
- Avg – Runs scored per dismissal
- * – Batsman remained not out
- 50 – Number of half centuries

Bowling

- Balls – Balls bowled in career
- Wkt – Wickets taken in career
- BBI – Best bowling in an innings
- Ave – Average runs per wicket

Fielding

- Ca – Catches taken
- St – Stumpings affected

== List of players ==
Statistics are correct as of 4 July 2026.

Sweden T20I cricketers
General					Batting				Bowling				Fielding		Ref
No.	Name	First	Last	Mat	Runs	HS	Avg	50	Balls	Wkt	BBI	Ave	Ca	St	Ref
1	Wynand Boshoff†	2021	2026	41	657	56*	23.46	2	–	–	–	–	31	10	
2	Dipanjan Dey	2021	2021	6	138	75*	34.50	1	–	–	–	–	3	0	
3	Oktai Gholami	2021	2021	5	–	–	–	–	102	4	2/22	26.25	1	0	
4	Hassan Mehmood	2021	2021	5	25	9	12.50	0	96	11	5/14	10.45	1	0	
5	Humayun Kabir	2021	2021	3	20	11*	10.00	0	–	–	–	–	0	0	
6	Imal Zuwak‡	2021	2026	47	818	70	19.02	3	6	0	–	–	21	0	
7	Liam Karlsson	2021	2022	16	43	14	8.60	0	257	18	4/20	14.77	12	0	
8	Khalid Zahid	2021	2025	31	230	47*	12.77	0	637	28	3/15	26.21	7	0	
9	Lemar Momand	2021	2022	7	4	2*	4.00	0	90	1	1/16	89.00	3	0	
10	Rahel Khan	2021	2021	7	133	37	19.00	0	42	1	1/16	53.00	2	0	
11	Abhijit Venkatesh‡	2021	2022	16	287	54	20.50	1	212	19	4/21	11.78	9	0	
12	Rahul Gowthaman	2021	2021	5	78	29	15.60	0	–	–	–	–	1	0	
13	Qudratullah Mir Afzail	2021	2021	6	24	13*	8.00	0	95	4	3/28	23.75	1	0	
14	Baz Ayubi	2021	2022	10	8	5*	8.00	0	120	7	2/14	20.00	3	0	
15	Azam Khalil	2022	2022	9	98	29	14.00	0	186	9	3/15	19.77	3	0	
16	Hamid Mahmood	2022	2026	20	301	69	27.36	2	327	17	3/10	17.23	6	0	
17	Sami Khalil	2022	2022	2	3	2	1.50	0	–	–	–	–	1	0	
18	Tasaduq Hussain	2022	2022	3	2	2	1.00	0	54	2	1/18	32.00	0	0	
19	Umar Nawaz	2022	2022	9	189	56	21.00	1	–	–	–	–	3	0	
20	Zaker Taqawi	2022	2024	16	62	17*	7.75	0	333	29	5/17	12.44	2	0	
21	Ismaeel Zia†	2022	2022	8	54	22	9.00	0	–	–	–	–	1	2	
22	Faseeh Choudary	2022	2022	2	0	0*	–	0	18	1	1/17	31.00	0	0	
23	Waqas Haider	2022	2022	3	35	19	17.50	0	–	–	–	–	2	0	
24	Ankit Dubey	2022	2022	2	5	5*	–	0	30	3	3/10	7.66	1	0	
25	Abdul Naser Baluch	2023	2026	26	104	23*	8.66	0	569	41	4/15	15.97	14	0	
26	Abdur Rahman Sudais	2023	2024	7	105	42	21.00	0	–	–	–	–	3	0	
27	Abu Zar	2023	2023	2	2	2	1.00	0	–	–	–	–	0	0	
28	Choudry Share Ali	2023	2024	9	221	61*	31.57	2	–	–	–	–	1	0	
29	Saeed Ahmed	2023	2026	33	419	73*	15.51	1	102	6	2/27	28.00	16	0	
30	Sami Rahmani	2023	2026	33	355	50	16.13	1	546	43	4/16	14.37	9	0	
31	Shahzeb Choudhry‡	2023	2023	5	22	11	7.33	0	104	10	4/11	8.50	5	0	
32	Zabiullah Zahid	2023	2026	22	112	25	14.00	0	455	20	2/16	24.15	2	0	
33	Prashant Shukla	2023	2024	6	9	6*	–	0	114	11	4/18	8.00	3	0	
34	Sandeep Mallidi	2024	2024	3	13	12	6.50	0	18	1	1/18	34.00	3	0	
35	Ajay Mundra†	2024	2026	33	806	76*	28.78	5	–	–	–	–	29	2	
36	Jawid Stanigze	2024	2025	8	84	33	16.80	0	100	6	2/31	20.50	7	0	
37	Awais Ahmad	2025	2026	24	355	43	15.43	0	48	2	1/15	33.50	8	0	
38	Advait Dhabe	2025	2026	27	157	32	26.16	0	624	39	4/16	16.87	8	0	
39	Syed Ali Gillani	2025	2025	3	4	3*	–	0	54	3	1/17	26.00	2	0	
40	Samarth Shetty	2025	2025	4	26	16	6.50	0	30	3	2/11	11.66	0	0	
41	Ihsanullah Wafa	2025	2025	5	114	49*	38.00	0	12	2	2/11	5.50	0	0	
42	Shreyas Swamy	2025	2026	12	7	6	3.50	0	252	21	4/17	13.76	1	0	
43	Aritra Bhakat	2025	2025	2	6	3*	6.00	0	–	–	–	–	0	0	
44	Sanuk Gedara	2025	2025	3	5	5*	–	0	43	3	2/25	22.66	1	0	
45	Yatharth Chauhan	2025	2026	23	525	71	29.16	3	42	4	1/8	17.00	10	0	
46	Sedik Sahak	2025	2026	7	0	0*	–	0	129	5	2/22	38.60	5	0	
47	Taimur Khan	2025	2025	1	–	–	–	–	6	1	1/0	12.66	0	0	
48	Darshan Lakhani	2025	2026	11	151	51	15.10	0	41	5	3/8	11.00	4	0	
49	Zaid Ahmad	2026	2026	17	162	43*	14.72	0	257	15	4/20	22.13	3	0	
50	Zain Muzaffar	2026	2026	11	50	18*	25.00	0	220	13	3/20	21.00	1	0	
