= Satish Kaul (cricketer) =

Austrian cricketer (born 1985)

Personal information
- Born: 6 February 1985 (age 41); Jalandhar, India
- Batting: Right-handed

Domestic team information
- Years: Team
- Austria
- Source: Cricinfo, 5 April 2014

Satish Kaul (born 6 February 1985) is an Austrian cricketer. He played for Austria in the 2011 ICC European T20 Championship Division One tournament.
