= List of Belgium Twenty20 International cricketers =

In April 2018, the ICC decided to grant full Twenty20 International (T20I) status to all its members. Therefore, all Twenty20 matches played between Belgium and other ICC members after 1 January 2019 will be eligible for T20I status.

This list comprises all members of the Belgium cricket team who have played at least one T20I match. It is initially arranged in the order in which each player won his first Twenty20 cap. Where more than one player won his first Twenty20 cap in the same match, those players are listed alphabetically by surname. Belgium played their first T20I matches in May 2019, as part of a three-match series against Germany.

== Key ==
General

- ‡ – Captain
- † – Wicket-keeper
- First – Year of debut
- Last – Year of latest game
- Mat – Number of matches played

Batting

- Runs – Runs scored in career
- HS – Highest score
- Avg – Runs scored per dismissal
- * – Batsman remained not out
- 50 – Half-centuries scored
- 100 – Centuries scored

Bowling

- Balls – Balls bowled in career
- Wkt – Wickets taken in career
- BBI – Best bowling in an innings
- Ave – Average runs per wicket

Fielding

- Ca – Catches taken
- St – Stumpings affected

== List of players ==
Statistics are correct as of 14 July 2026.

Belgium T20I cricketers
General					Batting					Bowling				Fielding		Ref
No.	Name	First	Last	Mat	Runs	HS	Avg	50	100	Balls	Wkt	BBI	Ave	Ca	St	Ref
1	Abdul Rashid	2019	2021	2	19	10	9.50	0	0	–	–	–	–	0	0	
2	Ashiqullah Said	2019	2021	12	17	9	4.25	0	0	264	17	3/15	14.76	2	0	
3	Aziz Mohammad	2019	2026	30	711	72	26.33	7	0	431	20	2/9	29.20	7	0	
4	Syed Jamil†	2019	2025	16	123	30	12.30	0	0	52	2	1/15	42.00	9	0	
5	Mamoon Latif	2019	2021	11	109	25	10.90	0	0	6	1	1/14	14.00	3	0	
6	Murid Ekrami	2019	2026	32	156	28	10.40	0	0	601	30	3/21	24.00	13	0	
7	Noman Kawami	2019	2019	1	2	2	2.00	0	0	18	1	1/28	28.00	0	0	
8	Noor Momand†	2019	2019	2	0	0*	–	0	0	–	–	–	–	2	0	
9	Saber Zakhil	2019	2026	60	1,195	100*	27.79	3	1	473	21	3/20	27.04	22	0	
10	Shaheryar Butt‡†	2019	2026	55	1,226	125*	30.65	4	1	13	0	–	–	28	0	
11	Zaki Ul Hassan	2019	2026	21	26	11*	13.00	0	0	425	32	4/24	17.15	9	0	
12	Saqlain Ali	2019	2021	6	31	26*	10.33	0	0	48	3	1/12	19.33	1	0	
13	Waqas Ali	2019	2024	7	50	14	10.00	0	0	70	3	2/26	28.66	1	0	
14	Soheel Hussain	2019	2019	1	–	–	–	–	–	6	0	–	–	0	0	
15	Khalid Ahmadi	2020	2026	46	317	31*	17.61	0	0	973	74	4/5	14.62	14	0	
16	Nemish Mehta‡	2020	2021	9	1	1	0.50	0	0	210	11	2/15	21.54	6	0	
17	Muhammad Muneeb	2020	2025	43	970	73	23.65	6	0	24	1	1/18	47.00	13	0	
18	Sazzad Hosen	2020	2024	8	102	34	12.75	0	0	12	0	–	–	1	0	
19	Wahidullah Usmani	2020	2021	7	144	72	20.57	1	0	–	–	–	–	1	0	
20	Sherul Mehta†	2020	2021	3	60	40	20.00	0	0	–	–	–	–	2	0	
21	Hadisullah Tarakhel	2021	2026	8	220	78	31.42	1	0	60	1	1/27	109.00	3	0	
22	Burhan Niaz‡	2021	2026	47	811	72*	22.52	4	0	282	20	4/8	17.65	8	0	
23	Said Hakim	2021	2026	6	106	28	26.50	0	0	42	0	–	–	2	0	
24	Sheraz Sheikh‡	2021	2026	48	625	57	18.93	2	0	421	21	3/22	25.00	16	0	
25	Faisal Mehmood	2021	2023	5	52	23	10.40	0	0	7	0	–	–	2	0	
26	Maqsood Ahmad	2021	2022	6	48	29	12.00	0	0	–	–	–	–	0	0	
27	Ali Raza‡†	2021	2026	36	532	64	17.16	3	0	–	–	–	–	33	5	
28	Shagharai Sefat	2021	2026	11	9	4	2.25	0	0	246	20	3/13	13.20	4	0	
29	Adnan Razzaq	2021	2025	11	14	7*	14.00	0	0	182	5	2/23	51.20	2	0	
30	Ahmad Khalid Ahmadzai	2022	2026	12	66	30*	9.42	0	0	193	16	4/15	14.18	2	0	
31	Fahim Bhatti	2022	2024	14	22	13*	11.00	0	0	246	5	1/5	58.20	3	0	
32	Omid Mailk Khel†	2022	2026	26	564	59*	29.68	2	0	12	0	–	–	11	3	
33	Sajad Ahmadzai	2022	2026	21	97	26*	13.85	0	0	376	21	3/22	21.47	3	0	
34	Ravi Thapliyal	2023	2026	16	18	7*	9.00	0	0	338	27	4/28	15.07	3	0	
35	Noorullah Sidiqi	2023	2023	1	6	6*	–	0	0	6	0	–	–	0	0	
36	Dumon Dewald	2024	2024	10	60	25	10.00	0	0	210	10	2/22	24.90	1	0	
37	Faisal Khaliq	2024	2026	15	131	49*	16.37	0	0	276	14	2/14	23.42	5	0	
38	Abduljabar Jabarkhail	2024	2024	6	18	18	9.00	0	0	126	5	2/30	35.00	0	0	
39	Mansoor Malangzai	2024	2024	4	86	33	21.50	0	0	–	–	–	–	1	0	
40	Omid Rahimi	2024	2026	6	129	55	43.00	1	0	–	–	–	–	1	0	
41	Abdul Hai Muhammad	2024	2024	3	21	21	7.00	0	0	–	–	–	–	0	0	
42	Iftikhar Kankhel	2025	2025	11	9	8*	4.50	0	0	185	14	3/14	19.85	2	0	
43	Oliver Herrington	2025	2025	7	72	44*	18.00	0	0	30	1	1/12	48.00	4	0	
44	Rafiulah Alokozai	2025	2025	7	8	7	2.66	0	0	108	4	1/16	44.00	5	0	
45	Shafiullah Zakhel	2025	2025	5	16	9*	16.00	0	0	90	6	3/12	21.16	0	0	
46	Walid Sahibzada†	2025	2026	8	115	56*	28.75	1	0	–	–	–	–	5	1	
47	Sajid Safi	2025	2025	2	1	1	1.00	0	0	6	0	–	–	1	0	
48	Rashid Khan	2026	2026	2	–	–	–	–	–	48	3	2/22	27.33	0	0	
