= Donovan Miller =

Jamaican cricket coach

Donovan St Byn Miller
- Born: 14 January 1979 (age 46); Jamaica
- Occupation: Cricket coach

Donovan Miller (born 14 January 1979) is a Jamaican-born former cricketer and current cricket coach. He represented Melbourne Cricket Club before moving to the UK, where he played 2nd XI cricket for Essex, Derbyshire, and minor county cricket for Hertfordshire. He played a role assisting Essex during the 2016 and 2017 County Championship campaigns, before commencing various roles for T20 franchises around the world. He was also part of the support staff for England's World Cup-winning campaign in 2019, as well as the Ashes series that followed later that summer.

== Caribbean Premier League ==
He was a part of the coaching staff for the Jamaica Tallawahs franchise in their CPL-winning 2016 season. He was then head coach of the St Kitts & Nevis Patriots for the 2017 (in which they finished runners-up), and 2018 (in which they finished 3rd) seasons, before returning to the Tallawahs as head coach in 2019. He is currently the assistant coach to Andy Flower for the St Lucia Zouks, who finished as runners-up in the 2020 season.

== Other Franchise Tournaments ==
Miller has also seen success in the Global T20 Canada tournament as head coach of the Vancouver Knights team. In the tournament's first edition in 2018, the Knights were victorious in the final against the Cricket West Indies team. The team then narrowly failed to defend their title the next year, losing the final in a super over to the Winnipeg Hawks.

He was part of the coaching staff for the title-winning Jozi Stars in the inaugural season of the Mzansi Super League, before being named head coach of the franchise for their 2019 season; this made him the only non-South African head coach in the competition.

In the 2020 edition of the Pakistan Super League, he was the bowling coach for Islamabad United.
