= Belgian Cricket Federation =

Cricket governing body of Belgium

- Sport: Cricket
- Jurisdiction: Belgium
- Abbreviation: BCF
- Founded: 1990
- Affiliation: International Cricket Council
- Affiliation date: 1991 (affiliate member); 2005 (associate member)
- Regional affiliation: ICC Europe
- Headquarters: Gent, East Flanders

Official website
- cricket-belgium.com
- (Belgium)

The Belgian Cricket Federation (BCF), currently branded as Cricket Belgium, is the governing body of the sport of cricket in Belgium. Founded in 1990, the organisation has been a member of the International Cricket Council (ICC) since 1991, and is also a member of the ICC Europe and the Belgian Olympic Committee. Its headquarters are in Edegem, a municipality in the province of Antwerp. A previous national governing body had been established in the early 20th century, but fell away during the Second World War.

== History ==
In one of those curious twists of history, this actually pre-dates Belgium itself by some 16 years. British Guards officers performed the honours, playing a match shortly before the Battle of Waterloo in 1815. Matches have been played to mark the 150th, 175th and 200th anniversaries of this occasion. The first record of organized cricket, however, can be found in a painting (left) dated 1870 which now hangs in the Pavilion at Lord's.

Registered under Belgian law as a non-profit organization and operating as Cricket Belgium, it is the second Belgian Cricket Federation. The first was formed in the early 1900s and disappeared on the death of its long-term official Comte Joseph d’Oultremont in October 1942. No records have been found. Formed again in 1990, Belgium gained the status of an affiliate member of the ICC in 1991. The present Belgian Cricket Federation was a founding member of the European Cricket Council (ECC) (now succeeded by ICC Europe) and is now an Associate member of the International Cricket Council (ICC) and the Belgian Olympic and Inter-federal Committee (BOIC).

Although cricket is thought to have originated in what is now Belgium in about the 14th century, the first recorded match was played at Enghien six days before the Battle of Waterloo in 1815.

== Club cricket in Belgium ==
More and more clubs were formed in the 1950s, 1970s, 1980s and 1990s. Today, 18 clubs and one school are members of either the Belgian Cricket Federation or its regional Flemish organisation Cricket Vlaanderen. In addition, there are a number of teams representing businesses and other organizations playing in a mid-week T20 competition and other non-League events.

== International Cricket Matches ==
On the European stage, Belgium has been a committed supporter of the ECC and ICC-Europe for many years with senior national teams taking part in championships and, since 2001, sending junior national sides to European Championships as well. Belgium is the current holder of the ICC-Europe Under-19 Division 2 title and has previously held Under-13 and Under-17 titles.

In 2011 the senior focus will shift towards T20 cricket in preparation for the new ICC-Europe Championship format.

Belgium hosted 12 countries for the ICC-Europe T20 Championships Division 2 in June 2013 and 5 nation European Cricket One-day U19 Tournament in August 2015.

A women’s cricket competition is held at Royal Brussels CC each year with a team selected to play home and away matches against Thoiry (Paris).

== International grounds ==
Locations of stadiums which have hosted international cricket matches in Belgium

Ground	City	Region	Capacity	Matches hosted	Notes
Royal Brussels Cricket Club	Waterloo	Walloon Brabant	1500	T20Is, ICC events	Main international ground; hosted ICC Men’s T20 World Cup Europe Qualifiers
Stars Arena	Mechelen	Flemish Brabant	600	T10s, domestic & ECS matches	Modern facility; used for European Cricket Series Belgium and club competitions

== Domestic Tournaments ==
=== Franchise Level ===
==== Men's Senior ====
- EUT20 Belgium

=== Current title holders ===
Tournament	Current	Champions	Runners-up	Next
Senior (men's)
EUT20 Belgium	2026	TBD	TBD	TBD

== See also ==
- Belgium national cricket team
- Belgium women's national cricket team
- Belgium national under-19 cricket team
- Belgium women's national under-19 cricket team
- EUT20 Belgium
