= Christopher Hawke =

English cricketer

Personal information
- Full name: Christopher Richard John Hawke
- Born: 12 April 1934 (age 92); Portsmouth, Hampshire, England
- Batting: Right-handed
- Role: Wicket-keeper

Domestic team information
- Years: Team
- 1953: Oxford University

Career statistics
Competition	First-class
Matches	1
Runs scored	31
Batting average	31.00
100s/50s	–/–
Top score	23*
Catches/stumpings	1/–
- Source: Cricinfo, 4 May 2020

Christopher Richard John Hawke RCOG (born 12 April 1934) is an English former physician and first-class cricketer.

The son of Dr Richard Francis Hawke, he was born at Portsmouth in April 1934. He was educated at Harrow School, before going up to Corpus Christi College, Oxford. While studying at Oxford, he made a single appearance in first-class cricket for Oxford University against Leicestershire at Oxford in 1953. Playing as the Oxford wicket-keeper, he batted twice in the match, ending the Oxford first innings unbeaten on 23, while in their second innings he was dismissed for 8 runs by Jack Walsh.

After graduating from Oxford in 1964, he became a medical doctor. He was made a fellow of the Royal College of Obstetricians and Gynaecologists in 1969, and worked at the London Hospital as a house surgeon and resident anesthetist. He later became a general practitioner at Fakenham, Norfolk.
