= Belgium national cricket team =

Belgium
- Association: Belgian Cricket Federation

Personnel
- Captain: Davinder Singh
- Coach: Davinder Singh

International Cricket Council
- ICC status: Associate member (2005); Affiliate member (1991)
- ICC region: Europe
ICC Rankings	Current	Best-ever
T20I	47th	37th (2 May 2023)

International cricket
- First international: France at Brussels; 19 June 1910

T20 Internationals
- First T20I: v Germany at Royal Brussels Cricket Club, Waterloo; 11 May 2019
- Last T20I: v Hungary at Svanholm Park, Brøndby; 14 July 2026
T20Is	Played	Won/Lost
Total	66	39/26 (1 tie, 0 no results)
This year	9	8/1 (0 ties, 0 no results)
T20I kit
- As of 14 July 2026

The Belgium national cricket team represents Belgium in international cricket. The team is organised by the Belgian Cricket Federation, which has been an associate member of the International Cricket Council (ICC) since 2005 (and previously an affiliate member, from 1991). Belgium played its first international match in 1910, in an exhibition tournament in Brussels that also featured France, the Netherlands, and the Marylebone Cricket Club (MCC). Since the 1990s, the team has regularly competed in European Cricket Council (ECC) tournaments, usually in the lower divisions.

== History ==
=== Beginnings ===
The first game of modern cricket in Belgium appears to have been a match played by British soldiers before the Battle of Waterloo in 1815, though research has suggested that cricket may be related to a game exported from Flanders to England in the 16th century. The first record of organised cricket is a painting dated 1870 that hangs in the pavilion of Lord's Cricket Ground in London that depicts the opening of the Brussels cricket ground in 1866 by mayor Jules Anspach.

The national team first played a match in 1905 when they played against the Netherlands. The match was played almost every year until 1986. Belgium hosted a tournament as part of the 1910 Brussels Exhibition also involving France, the MCC and the Netherlands. Belgium lost their match against the MCC by an innings and lost to the Netherlands by 116 runs.

=== ICC membership ===
Belgium became an affiliate member of the ICC in 1991. They began to play in European tournaments, playing in the ECC Trophy for the first time in 1999 when they finished last. They fared better in the next tournament, reaching the semi-finals of the 2001 ECC Trophy in Austria.

They finished sixth in the ECC Trophy in 2003, and gained associate membership of the ICC two years later. Belgium finished fourth in the European Affiliates Championship in 2005 and both played and hosted Division Three of the newly restructured European Championship in August 2007, they finished fifth.

In 2009, Belgium played in La Manga Club Ground, again in Division 3. Richard Nash captained the team and finished fourth. In 2011, Belgium hosted the new 2011 ICC European T20 Championship Division Two where they won the championship undefeated. The captain for the T20 squad was André Wagener. Belgium got promoted to Division 1 where they finished a credible 7th out of 12 teams having fielded a weakened team because of visa issues. Their performance qualified them for the WCL 8 qualifier the following year.

In 2012, Belgium played the World Cricket League 8 Qualifier in La Manga Club Ground where they beat Gibraltar, Austria and France to qualify for the World Cricket league for the first time. Captained by Sheriyar Butt and Simon Newport in this tournament, they will travel to Samoa in September. On 31 July, the Under-19 Belgium Cricket Team (Aadit Sheth, Aaryan Mehta, Raj Sanghvi, Sabhya Jain, Burhan Niaz, Shaan Shah, Dev Jogani, Aarjav Jain, Alex Uzupris, Theodore Develodore, Aamad Ali Rehman, Rehaan Shah and Zeeshan Diwan Ali), travelled to Essex to participate in the U19 Cricket World Cup Qualifier Europe Division 2.

=== 2018-Present ===
In April 2018, the ICC decided to grant full Twenty20 International (T20I) status to all its members. Therefore, all Twenty20 matches played between Belgium and other ICC members after 1 January 2019 will be a full T20I. Belgium played their first Twenty20 International on 11 May 2019 against Germany.

11 May 2019
11:00
Scorecard

Germany; 128/7 (20 overs)	v	Belgium; 119/6 (20 overs)
Harmanjot Singh 39* (27); Murid Ekrami 1/10 (1 over)		Shaheryar Butt 30* (27); Ahmed Wardak 3/31 (4 overs)

Germany won by 9 runs
Royal Brussels Cricket Club, Waterloo
Umpires: Mark Jameson (Ger) and Andrew Scott (Bel)
Player of the match: Ahmed Wardak (Ger)

- Belgium won the toss and elected to field.
- First ever T20I match for Belgium.

In August 2020, Belgium won the 2020 Luxembourg T20I Trophy tournament, after winning all four matches they played in.

== Tournament history ==
=== ICC Cricket World Cup ===
Cricket World Cup records
Year	Round	Position	GP	W	L	T	NR	Win%
(England) 1975	Did not participate							
(England) 1979	Did not qualify							
(England) (Wales) 1983	Did not qualify							
(India) (Pakistan) 1987	Did not qualify							
(Australia) (New Zealand) 1992	Did not qualify							
(India) (Pakistan) (Sri Lanka) 1996	Did not qualify							
(England) (Wales) (Scotland) (Republic of Ireland) (Netherlands) 1999	Did not qualify							
(South Africa) 2003	Did not qualify							
(Cricket West Indies) 2007	Did not qualify							
(India) (Sri Lanka) (Bangladesh) 2011	Did not qualify							
(Australia) (New Zealand) 2015	Did not qualify							
(England) (Wales) 2019	Did not qualify							
(India) 2023	Did not qualify							
(South Africa) (Zimbabwe) (Namibia) 2027	TBD							
(India) (Bangladesh) 2031	TBD							
Total	0 medals	0/13		0	0	0	0	0

=== ICC T20 World Cup ===
Men's T20 World Cup records
Year	Round	Position	GP	W	L	T	NR	Win%
(South Africa) 2007	Did not qualify							
(England) 2009	Did not qualify							
(Cricket West Indies) 2010	Did not qualify							
(Sri Lanka) 2012	Did not qualify							
(Bangladesh) 2014	Did not qualify							
(India) 2016	Did not qualify							
(United Arab Emirates) 2021	Did not qualify							
(Australia) 2022	Did not qualify							
(United States) (Cricket West Indies) 2024	Did not qualify							
(India) (Sri Lanka) 2026	Did not qualify							
(Australia) (New Zealand) 2028	TBD							
(England) (Wales) (Republic of Ireland) (Scotland) 2030	TBD							
Total	0 medals	0/10		0	0	0	0	0

=== European Affiliates Championship ===
One-Day

- 1999: 7th place
- 2001: Semi-finals
- 2003: 6th place
- 2005: 4th place
- 2007: 5th place (remaining in division 3)
- 2009: 4th place (remaining il division 3)
- 2012: 1st place World Cricket League 8 qualifier. Tournament in September in Samoa.

T20

- 2011: 1st Place Division 2 T20 World Cup Qualifier.
- 2011: 7th place Division 1 T20 World Cup Qualifier.

== Current squad ==
Updated as of 26 May 2024

This lists all the players who have played for Belgium in the past 12 months or has been part of the latest T20I squad.

Name	Age	Batting style	Bowling style	Notes
Batters
Shaheryar Butt	44	Right-handed	Right-arm off break	
Muhammad Muneeb	29	Left-handed	Right-arm leg break	
Manzoor Malangzai	28	Right-handed	Right-arm medium	
All-rounders
Saber Zakhil	29	Right-handed	Right-arm medium	
Burhan Niaz	22	Right-handed	Right-arm medium	
Sheraz Sheikh	38	Right-handed	Slow left-arm orthodox	Vice-captain
Faisal Khaliq	32	Right-handed	Right-arm medium	
Dumon Dewald	25	Right-handed	Right-arm leg break	
Wicket-keepers
Ali Raza	42	Right-handed		Captain
Omid Rahimi	33	Right-handed		
Spin Bowler
Ravi Thapliyal	36	Left-handed	Slow left-arm orthodox	
Pace Bowlers
Khalid Ahmadi	31	Right-handed	Right-arm medium	
Sajad Ahmadzai	24	Right-handed	Right-arm medium	
Adnan Razzaq	40	Right-handed	Right-arm medium	
Zaki Shah	38	Right-handed	Right-arm medium	
Abduljabar Jabarkhail	24	Right-handed	Left-arm medium	

== International grounds ==
Locations of stadiums which have hosted international cricket matches in Belgium

Ground	City	Region	Capacity	Matches hosted	Notes
Royal Brussels Cricket Club	Waterloo	Walloon Brabant	1500	T20Is, ICC events	Main international ground; hosted ICC Men’s T20 World Cup Europe Qualifiers
Stars Arena	Zemst	Flemish Brabant	600	T10s, domestic & ECS matches	Modern facility; used for European Cricket Series Belgium and club competitions

== Records and statistics ==
International Match Summary — Belgium

Last updated 14 July 2026

Playing Record
Format	M	W	L	T	NR	Inaugural Match
Twenty20 Internationals	66	39	26	1	0	11 May 2019

=== Twenty20 International ===
- Belgium's highest score: 233/6 v Malta, 11 June 2022 at Ghent Oval, Meersen, Ghent.
- Highest individual score: 125*, Shaheryar Butt v Czech Republic, 29 August 2020 at Pierre Werner Cricket Ground, Walferdange.
- Best bowling figures in an innings: 4/8, Burman Niaz v Malta, 8 July 2021 at Marsa Sports Club, Marsa.

Most T20I runs for Belgium

Player	Runs	Average	Career span
Shaheryer Butt	1,226	30.65	2019–2026
Saber Zakhil	1,195	27.79	2019–2026
Muhammad Muneeb	970	23.65	2020–2025
Burhan Niaz	811	22.52	2021–2026
Aziz Mohammad	711	26.33	2019–2026

Most T20I wickets for Belgium

Player	Wickets	Average	Career span
Khalid Ahmadi	74	14.62	2020–2026
Zaki Ul Hassan	32	17.15	2019–2026
Murid Ekrami	30	24.00	2019–2026
Ravi Thapliyal	27	15.07	2023–2026

T20I record versus other nations

Records complete to T20I #4032. Last updated 14 July 2026.

Opponent	M	W	L	T	NR	First match	First win
vs Associate Members
Austria	12	4	8	0	0	24 July 2021	24 July 2021
Croatia	1	0	1	0	0	8 July 2024	
Czech Republic	2	2	0	0	0	29 August 2020	29 August 2020
Denmark	1	1	0	0	0	1 July 2022	1 July 2022
France	4	2	1	1	0	10 May 2024	12 May 2024
Germany	7	0	7	0	0	11 May 2019	
Gibraltar	2	2	0	0	0	28 June 2022	28 June 2022
Guernsey	4	2	2	0	0	8 June 2024	8 June 2024
Hungary	4	4	0	0	0	29 June 2022	29 June 2022
Jersey	1	0	1	0	0	10 July 2024	
Luxembourg	2	2	0	0	0	29 August 2020	29 August 2020
Malta	13	11	2	0	0	8 July 2021	8 July 2021
Portugal	4	1	3	0	0	2 July 2022	1 June 2025
Romania	4	3	1	0	0	29 June 2025	29 June 2025
Serbia	2	2	0	0	0	12 July 2024	12 July 2024
Spain	1	1	0	0	0	4 July 2022	4 July 2022
Switzerland	2	2	0	0	0	7 July 2024	7 July 2024

== See also ==
- EUT20 Belgium
- List of Belgium Twenty20 International cricketers
