= List of Denmark List A cricketers =

The Denmark national cricket team played its first match in 1954 against Oxford University. They have appeared in thirty-one List A matches. From 1999 to 2005, Denmark was permitted to take part in the English domestic one-day competition, in which they made two NatWest Trophy and four Cheltenham & Gloucester Trophy appearances. The players in this list have all played at least one List A match. Danish cricketers who have not represented the county in List A cricket are excluded from the list.

Players are listed in order of appearance. Where multiple players made their debut in the same match, they are ordered by batting order. Players in bold represented Denmark as permitted overseas players when Denmark participated in the English domestic one-day competition.

== Key ==
**General**

- ‡ – Captain
- † – Wicket-keeper
- **First** – Year of debut for Denmark
- **Last** – Year of latest match played for Denmark
- **Mat** – Number of matches played for Denmark
- **Win%** – Winning percentage

**Batting**

- **Inn** – Number of innings batted
- **NO** – Number of innings not out
- **Runs** – Runs scored in career
- **HS** – Highest score
- **100** – Centuries scored
- **50** – Half-centuries scored
- **Avg** – Runs scored per dismissal
- * – Batsman remained not out

**Bowling**

- **Balls** – Balls bowled in career
- **Wkt** – Wickets taken in career
- **BBI** – Best bowling in an innings
- **BBM** – Best bowling in a match
- **Ave** – Average runs per wicket

**Fielding**

- **Ca** – Catches taken
- **St** – Stumpings effected

== List of players ==
No.	Name	First	Last	Mat	Runs	HS	Avg	Balls	Wkt	BBI	Ave	Ca	St
No.	Name	First	Last	Mat	Batting			Bowling				Fielding	
1	Peter Thomsen	1999	1999	1	0	0	0.00	0	0	–	–	0	0
2	Baljit Singh†	1999	2005	8	217	58	31.00	0	0	–	–	5	1
3	Aftab Ahmed‡	1999	2005	14	315	94	24.23	156	3	2/46	48.33	4	0
4	Carsten Pedersen‡	1999	2008/09	29	720	68	26.66	144	0	–	–	10	0
5	Mohammad Saddiq†	1999	2001	6	97	36	19.40	0	0	–	–	2	0
6	Atif Butt	1999	1999	1	35	35	35.00		0	–	–	0	0
7	Amjad Khan	1999	2000	7	101	65*	20.20	345	7	2/38	35.71	1	0
8	Morten Hedegaard‡	1999	2008/09	17	129	1	0.50	88	2	2/46	31.50	1	0
9	Mogens Dahl Nielsen	1999	2000	5	58	49*	19.33	84	2	1/16	42.00	1	0
10	Lars Hedegaard	1999	2007/08	13	167	46*	16.70	384	5	2/21	47.00	5	0
11	Dennis Zachariasson	1999	2002	3	20	16*	–	66	1	1/22	65.00	0	0
12	Jan Overgaard	1999/00	2000	5	80	67*	20.00	0	0	–	–	1	0
13	Mickey Lund	1999/00	2008/09	20	360	59	18.00	0	0	–	–	3	0
14	Thomas Hansen	1999/00	2008/09	23	270	51	22.50	967	33	6/30	21.03	6	0
15	Soren Kristensen	1999/00	1999/00	5	24	13	8.00	192	2	1/14	51.00	3	0
16	Andreas Lambert	1999/00	2003	3	74	38*	37.00	18	0	–	–	0	0
17	Frederik Klokker‡†	1999/00	2019	29	881	138*	36.71	0	0	–	–	22	6
18	Martin Jensen	1999/00	1999/00	2	18	18*	–	55	4	3/27	11.75	0	0
19	Bobby Chawla	2000	2008/09	23	133	31	8.31	920	22	4/38	32.59	5	0
20	Mogens Christiansen	2001	2001	1	9	9	9.00	0	0	–	–	0	0
21	**Terry Crabb**	2001	2001	1	0	0	0.00	42	2	2/19	9.50	0	0
22	Saad Hafeez	2001	2002	2	16	10	16.00	23	1	1/14	18.00	1	0
23	Henrik Hansen	2001	2008/09	20	148	45*	12.33	877	14	2/28	47.42	4	0
24	Rasmus Kofoed	2002	2002	1	14	14	14.00	0	0	–	–	0	0
25	**Bryce McGain**	2002	2002	1	51	51	51.00	60	0	–	–	1	0
26	Soren Vestergaard‡	2003	2008/09	6	66	39	11.00	78	1	1/22	65.00	0	0
27	Umar Farooq	2003	2003	1	12	12	12.00	60	0	–	–	0	0
28	**Ben Edmondson**	2003	2003	1	2	2*	–	56	2	2/33	16.50	0	0
29	Rashid Ali	2005	2005	5	40	19	8.00	0	0	–	–	0	0
30	Johan Malcolm	2005	2007/08	12	157	71	14.27	404	7	3/38	51.14	4	0
31	Michael Pedersen	2005	2008/09	19	406	121	25.37	360	2	1/21	153.50	4	0
32	**Darren Treumer**†	2005	2005	1	7	7	7.00	0	0	–	–	2	0
33	Max Overgaard	2005	2008/09	9	105	24	13.12	25	0	–	–	2	0
34	Zishan Shah	2005	2019	7	30	12	7.50	60	2	1/16	25.50	1	0
35	Henrik Øre	2005	2005	1	0	0	0.00	42	1	1/28	28.00	0	0
36	Thomas Nielsen	2005	2005	1	0	0	0.00	53	1	1/30	30.00	0	0
37	David Borchersen	2005	2008/09	18	195	36*	13.00	730	22	4/43	26.54	5	0
38	Jesper Hansen	2005	2005	5	34	17	8.50	0	0	–	–	1	0
39	Niels Kopperholdt	2005	2005	3	14	12*	–	138	3	3/45	33.00	2	0
40	Bashir Shah	2007/08	2008/09	12	21	10*	7.00	527	12	2/40	39.25	3	0
41	Anders Rasmussen	2007/08	2007/08	1	0	–	–	30	1	1/25	25.00	0	0
42	Rizwan Mahmood	2008/09	2022	13	98	18	8.16	0	0	–	–	1	0
43	Rohit Kanaiya	2008/09	2008/09	2	7	7	3.50	52	0	–	–	0	0
44	Jacob Larsen	2008/09	2008/09	1	12	12	12.00	60	1	1/38	38.00	1	0
45	Jonas Henriksen	2019	2024	10	117	39*	19.50	272	9	3/49	33.55	4	–
46	Hamid Shah‡	2019	2022	14	605	138	43.21	498	12	3/37	32.33	3	–
47	Zameer Khan	2019	2022	13	404	60	31.07	0	0	–	–	1	–
48	Anique Uddin	2019	2019	5	76	43	25.33	168	1	1/22	115.00	–	–
49	Abdul Hashmi†	2019	2022	12	59	33*	29.50	0	0	–	–	15	1
50	Jino Jojo	2019	2022	7	96	37	13.71	305	11	4/29	23.45	–	–
51	Oliver Hald	2019	2022	14	143	37*	14.30	552	19	2/17	23.47	7	–
52	Nicolaj Laegsgaard	2019	2022	14	265	69	24.09	696	26	6/6	14.65	10	–
53	Delawar Khan	2019	2019	4	28	23*	9.33	211	9	3/15	16.55	1	–
54	Lucky Ali	2019	2019	1	0	–	–	6	0	–	–	1	–
55	Surya Anand	2022	2024	14	322	44	24.76	432	13	4/33	25.46	8	–
56	Saif Ahmad	2022	2024	9	577	140	44.38	589	22	5/38	22.31	2	–
57	Musa Shaheen	2022	2022	7	30	15	6.00	0	0	–	–	2	–
58	Shangeev Thanikaithasan	2022	2022	9	147	59	21.00	42	0	–	–	3	–
59	Saud Munir	2022	2022	9	0	0*	0.00	317	6	3/57	44.16	2	–
60	Taranjit Bharaj	2022	2022	4	109	45	27.25	12	0	–	–	–	–
61	Saran Aslam	2022	2022	1	2	2	2.00	0	0	–	–	–	–

== List A captains ==
No.	Name	First	Last	Mat	Won	Lost	Tied	No result	Win%
1	Morten Hedegaard	1999	1999/00	6	3	3	0	0	50.00%
2	Aftab Ahmed	2000	2002	3	0	3	0	0	0%
3	Soren Vestergaard	2003	2003	1	0	1	0	0	0%
4	Carsten Pedersen	2005	2005	8	2	5	0	1 (Note: One match between Denmark and the UAE in 2005 was begun but not completed. This is not included in calculations of win percentages.)	28.57%
5	Frederik Klokker	2007/08	2008/09	13	2	11	0	0	15.50%
6	Hamid Shah	2019	2024	19	10	9	0	0	52.63%
**Total**		1999	2022	**50**	**17**	**32**	**0**	**1**	**34.69%**

== See also ==
- Denmark national cricket team
