= 2012 ICC World Cricket League Division Four =

2012 ICC WCL Division 4
- Administrator: International Cricket Council
- Cricket format: Limited overs cricket
- Tournament format(s): Round-robin and Knockout
- Host: Malaysia
- Champions: Nepal
- Participants: 6
- Matches: 18
- Player of the series: (Nepal) Basanta Regmi
- Most runs: (United States) Sushil Nadkarni (238)
- Most wickets: (Nepal) Basanta Regmi (21)
- Official website: International Cricket Council

The 2012 ICC World Cricket League Division Four was a cricket tournament which took place from 3 to 10 September 2012 in Malaysia. It formed part of the ICC World Cricket League and qualifying for the 2015 World Cup.

== Teams ==
The six teams that took part in the tournament were decided according to the results of the 2010 ICC World Cricket League Division Four, the 2011 ICC World Cricket League Division Three and the 2012 ICC World Cricket League Division Five.

Key
†	Denotes relegated teams
†	Denotes unmoved teams
†	Denotes promoted teams

Team	Last outcome
Denmark	5th in 2011 ICC World Cricket League Division Three, Hong Kong
United States	6th in 2011 ICC World Cricket League Division Three, Hong Kong
Nepal	3rd in 2010 ICC World Cricket League Division Four, Italy
Tanzania	4th in 2010 ICC World Cricket League Division Four, Italy
Singapore	1st in 2012 ICC World Cricket League Division Five, Singapore
Malaysia	2nd in 2012 ICC World Cricket League Division Five, Singapore

== Squads ==
Denmark	Malaysia	Nepal	Singapore	Tanzania	United States
Michael Pedersen (C); Aftab Ahmed; Shehzad Ahmed; Taha Ahmed (Wk); Sair Anjum; Bobby Chawla; Henrik Hansen; Frederik Klokker (Wk); Andreas Lambert; Rizwan Mahmood; Carsten Pedersen; Bashir Shah; Hamid Shah; Lejf Slepsager	Suhan Alagaratnam (C); Rashid Ahad; Nik Arifin; Anwar Arudin; Hiran Brahman Ralalage; Khizar Hayat; Hassan Ghulam; Rakesh Madhavan; Ahmad Faiz; Shafiq Sharif (Wk); Shahrulnizam Yusof; Suresh Navaratnam; Suharril Fetri; Hammad Ullah Khan	Paras Khadka (C); Gyanendra Malla (vc) (Wk); Pradeep Airee (Wk); Prithu Baskota; Amrit Bhattarai; Binod Das; Shakti Gauchan; Subash Khakurel (Wk); Anil Mandal; Basanta Regmi; Sanjam Regmi; Chandra Sawad; Sharad Vesawkar; Rahul Vishwakarma	Saad Janjua (C); Shoaib Razzak; Munish Arora; Rezza Gaznavi; Christopher Janik (Wk); Chaminda Ruwan; Amjad Mahboob; Mulewa Dharmichand; Anish Param; Pramodh Raja; Narender Reddy; Kshitij Shinde; Abhiraj Singh; Chetan Suryawanshi (Wk)	Hamisi Abdallah (C); Seif Khalifa; Zamayoni Jabeneke; Tambwe Juma; Issa Kikasi (Wk); Ally Kimote; Enjo Kiongozi; Riziki Kiseto; Nasibu Mapunda; Benson Mwita; Kassim Nassoro; Abhik Patwa (Wk); Khalil Rehemtulla; Nassoro Saidi	Steve Massiah (C); Sushil Nadkarni (vc); Timroy Allen; Orlando Baker; Ryan Corns; Akeem Dodson (Wk); Muhammad Ghous; Elmore Hutchinson; Aditya Mishra; Andy Mohammed; Abhimanyu Rajp; Usman Shuja; Steven Taylor (Wk); Aditya Thyagarajan

== Fixtures ==
=== Group stage ===
==== Points table ====
Pos	Team	Pld	W	L	T	NR	Pts	NRR	Promotion or relegation
1	Nepal	5	5	0	0	0	10	2.251	Met in the final and promoted to Division Three for 2013
2	United States	5	3	2	0	0	6	1.240	Met in the final and promoted to Division Three for 2013
3	Singapore	5	3	2	0	0	6	0.858	Met in the 3rd place playoff and remained in Division Four for 2014
4	Denmark	5	3	2	0	0	6	0.562	Met in the 3rd place playoff and remained in Division Four for 2014
5	Malaysia	5	1	4	0	0	2	−1.496	Met in the 5th place playoff and relegated to Division Five for 2014
6	Tanzania	5	0	5	0	0	0	−3.046	Met in the 5th place playoff and relegated to Division Five for 2014

==== Matches ====
3 September
10:30
Scorecard

Denmark; 224 (50 overs)	v	Tanzania; 136/7 (50 overs)
Carsten Pedersen 48 (88); Kassim Nassoro 4/40 (10 overs)		Nasibu Mapunda 32 (66); Lejf Slepsager 3/24 (10 overs)

Denmark won by 88 runs
Kinrara Academy Oval, Kuala Lumpur
Umpires: Viswanadan Kalidas (Mas) and Sri Ganesh (Sin)
Player of the match: Aftab Ahmed (Den)

- Denmark won the toss and elected to bat

3 September
10:30
Scorecard

Singapore; 111 (39.5 overs)	v	Nepal; 112/5 (24.5 overs)
Anish Param 31 (89); Amrit Bhattarai 4/28 (9 overs)		Pradeep Airee 34* (25); Amjad Mahboob 3/37 (7 overs)

Nepal won by 5 wickets
Selangor Turf Club, Kuala Lumpur
Umpires: Sameer Bandekar (USA) and Ranmore Martinesz (Sri)
Player of the match: Amrit Bhattarai (Nep)

- Singapore won the toss and elected to bat

3 September
10:30
Scorecard

United States; 289/5 (50 overs)	v	Malaysia; 219/8 (50 overs)
Sushil Nadkarni 73 (96); Nik Arifin 1/27 (4 overs)		Suharril Fetri 60 (112); Elmore Hutchinson 2/22 (8 overs)

United States of America won by 70 runs
Bayuemas Oval, Kuala Lumpur
Umpires: Wynand Louw (Nam) and Ashwani Rana (Tha)
Player of the match: Timroy Allen (USA)

- Malaysia won the toss and elected to field

4 September
10:30
Scorecard

Singapore; 230/9 (50 overs)	v	Malaysia; 91/8 (29 overs)
Christopher Janik 106 (144); Hassan Ghulam 5/39 (10 overs)		Khizar Hayat 31* (26); Pramodh Raja 3/13 (5 overs)

Singapore won by 112 runs (D/L)
Kinrara Academy Oval, Kuala Lumpur
Umpires: Ranmore Martinesz (Sri) and Ashwani Rana (Tha)
Player of the match: Christopher Janik (Sin)

- Singapore won the toss and elected to bat
- Rain stopped the Malaysia innings after 29 overs, thus setting a target of 204 for Malaysia in 29 overs

4 September
10:30
Scorecard

Denmark; 244/9 (50 overs)	v	United States; 86/5 (23.4 overs)
Michael Pedersen 59 (68); Timroy Allen 5/33 (9 overs)		Steven Taylor 30 (24); Bashir Shah 3/11 (5 overs)

Denmark won by 56 runs (D/L)
Selangor Turf Club, Kuala Lumpur
Umpires: Sri Ganesh (Sin) and Durga Subedi (Nep)
Player of the match: Michael Pedersen (Den)

- United States of America won the toss and elected to bowl
- Rain stopped the United States innings after 23.4 overs, thus setting the United States a target of 143 in 23.4 overs

4 September
10:30
Scorecard

Tanzania; 82 (31.4 overs)	v	Nepal; 83/2 (19.4 overs)
Issa Kikasi 33 (47); Paras Khadka 4/24 (9 overs)		Gyanendra Malla 28* (39); Khalil Rehemtulla 1/22 (4 overs)

Nepal won by 8 wickets
Bayuemas Oval, Kuala Lumpur
Umpires: Sameer Bandekar (USA) and Viswanadan Kalidas (Mas)
Player of the match: Paras Khadka (Nep)

- Tanzania won the toss and elected to bat

6 September
10:30
Scorecard

Tanzania; 92 (29.3 overs)	v	United States; 93/3 (9 overs)
Kassim Nassoro 28 (29); Usman Shuja 3/14 (6 overs)		Steven Taylor 46 (22); Abhik Patwa 1/4 (1 over)

United States of America won by 7 wickets
Kinrara Academy Oval, Kuala Lumpur
Umpires: Sri Ganesh (Sin) and Durga Subedi (Nep)
Player of the match: Usman Shuja (USA)

- United States of America won the toss and elected to field

6 September
10:30
Scorecard

Malaysia; 69 (32.1 overs)	v	Nepal; 71/0 (12.2 overs)
Shafiq Sharif 22 (26); Shakti Gauchan 3/2 (10 overs)		Anil Mandal 41* (40); Khizar Hayat 0/10 (2.2 overs)

Nepal won by 10 wickets
Selangor Turf Club, Kuala Lumpur
Umpires: Wynand Louw (Nam) and Ranmore Martinesz (Sri)
Player of the match: Shakti Gauchan (Nep)

- Malaysia won the toss and elected to bat

6 September
10:30
Scorecard

Denmark; 173 (46.3 overs)	v	Singapore; 174/6 (46.4 overs)
Shehzad Ahmed 50 (100); Saad Janjua 2/13 (5 overs)		Munish Arora 39* (41); Michael Pedersen 2/24 (10 overs)

Singapore won by 4 wickets
Bayuemas Oval, Kuala Lumpur
Umpires: Viswanadan Kalidas (Mas) and Ashwani Rana (Tha)
Player of the match: Munish Arora (Sin)

- Denmark won the toss and elected to bat

7 September
10:30
Scorecard

Nepal; 258/8 (50 overs)	v	United States; 226 (48.2 overs)
Subash Khakurel 115 (142); Timroy Allen 2/69 (10 overs)		Sushil Nadkarni 84 (106); Basanta Regmi 5/35 (10 overs)

Nepal won by 32 runs
Kinrara Academy Oval, Kuala Lumpur
Umpires: Viswanadan Kalidas (Mas) and Ashwani Rana (Tha)
Player of the match: Subash Khakurel (Nep)

- Nepal won the toss and elected to bat

7 September
10:30
Scorecard

Tanzania; 94 (27.1 overs)	v	Singapore; 97/2 (11.2 overs)
Abhik Patwa 47 (58); Abhiraj Singh 5/12 (8.1 overs)		Chetan Suryawanshi 62* (38); Khalil Rehemtulla 1/8 (1 over)

Singapore won by 8 wickets
Selangor Turf Club, Kuala Lumpur
Umpires: Ranmore Martinesz (Sri) and Durga Subedi (Nep)
Player of the match: Abhiraj Singh (Sin)

- Singapore won the toss and elected to bowl

7 September
10:30
Scorecard

Malaysia; 252 (49.5 overs)	v	Denmark; 254/7 (48.1 overs)
Suhan Alagaratnam 48 (70); Bashir Shah 3/41 (4.5 overs)		Carsten Pedersen 83 (104); Hassan Ghulam 2/36 (9 overs)

Denmark won by 3 wickets
Bayuemas Oval, Kuala Lumpur
Umpires: Sameer Bandekar (USA) and Wynand Louw (Nam)
Player of the match: Carsten Pedersen (Den)

- Malaysia won the toss and elected to bat

9 September
10:30
Scorecard

Nepal; 240 (50 overs)	v	Denmark; 130/9 (31 overs)
Anil Mandal 113 (134); Bashir Shah 2/35 (6 overs)		Andreas Lambert 47 (79); Paras Khadka 4/34 (6 overs)

Nepal win by 25 runs (D/L)
Kinrara Academy Oval, Kuala Lumpur
Umpires: Sameer Bandekar (USA) and Ranmore Martinesz (Sri)
Player of the match: Anil Mandal (Nep)

- Nepal won the toss and elected to bat
- Rain stopped the Denmark innings after 25 overs, thus setting them a target of 156 in 31 overs

9 September
10:30
Scorecard

Tanzania; 187 (49.2 overs)	v	Malaysia; 191/5 (37.1 overs)
Kassim Nassoro 47 (51); Shahrulnizam Yusof 3/30 (10 overs)		Rakesh Madhavan 102* (104); Khalil Rehemtulla 3/46 (10 overs)

Malaysia win by 5 wickets
Selangor Turf Club, Kuala Lumpur
Umpires: Ashwani Rana (Tha) and Sri Ganesh (Sin)
Player of the match: Rakesh Madhavan (Mas)

- Tanzania won the toss and elected to bat

9 September
10:30
Scorecard

United States; 263 (49 overs)	v	Singapore; 129/8 (24 overs)
Steven Taylor 50 (46); Saad Janjua 4/40 (8 overs)		Munish Arora 26 (29); Muhammad Ghous 2/20 (6 overs)

United States of America won by 37 runs (D/L)
Bayuemas Oval, Kuala Lumpur
Umpires: Wynand Louw (Nam) and Durga Subedi (Nep)
Player of the match: Timroy Allen (USA)

- United States of America won the toss and elected to bat
- Rain interrupted the Singapore innings after 2 overs, thus setting them a target of 186 in 27 overs, however the rain again returned after 24 overs, thus adjusting their target to 167

=== Playoffs ===
==== 5th place playoff ====
10 September
Scorecard

Tanzania; 187 (49.4 overs)	v	Malaysia; 188/5 (45.5 overs)
Abhik Patwa 67 (105); Rashid Ahad 3/33 (10 overs)		Shafiq Sharif 57* (80); Abhik Patwa 2/35 (8 overs)

Malaysia won by 5 wickets
Bayuemas Oval, Kuala Lumpur
Umpires: Sameer Bandekar (USA) and Ashwani Rana (Tha)
Player of the match: Abhik Patwa (Tan)

- Malaysia won the toss and elected to field

==== 3rd place playoff ====
10 September
Scorecard

Denmark; 83 (26 overs)	v	Singapore; 87/5 (16.2 overs)
Rizwan Mahmood 19 (41); Chetan Suryawanshi 3/23 (7 overs)		Chetan Suryawanshi 45 (29); Bashir Shah 5/11 (8 overs)

Singapore won by 5 wickets
Selangor Turf Club, Kuala Lumpur
Umpires: Viswanadan Kalidas (Mas) and Durga Subedi (Nep)
Player of the match: Chetan Suryawanshi (Sin)

- Denmark won the toss and elected to bat

==== Final ====
10 September
Scorecard

United States; 145 (48.1 ov)	v	Nepal; 147/2 (28.0 ov)
Sushil Nadkarni 39 (69); Basanta Regmi 5/20 (9.1 overs)		Gyanendra Malla 66 (65); Elmore Hutchinson 1/16 (3 overs)

Nepal won by 8 wickets
Kinrara Academy Oval, Kuala Lumpur
Umpires: Wynand Louw (Nam) and Sri Ganesh (Sin)
Player of the match: Basanta Regmi (Nep)

- United States of America won the toss and elected to bat

== Statistics ==
=== Most Runs ===
The top five run scorers (total runs) are included in this table.

Player	Team	Runs	Inns	Avg	S/R	HS	100s	50s
Sushil Nadkarni	United States	238	5	47.60	69.38	84	0	2
Steven Taylor	United States	216	6	36.00	104.85	62	0	2
Subash Khakurel	Nepal	208	6	52.00	64.59	115	1	0
Anil Mandal	Nepal	186	6	37.20	76.54	113	1	0
Gyanendra Malla	Nepal	178	6	44.50	83.17	66	0	1

=== Most Wickets ===
The top five wicket takers (total wickets) are listed in this table.

Player	Team	Wkts	Mts	Ave	S/R	Econ	BBI
Basanta Regmi	Nepal	21	6	6.66	14.2	2.80	5/20
Bashir Shah	Denmark	13	6	11.92	22.6	3.16	5/11
Mulewa Dharmichand	Singapore	11	6	14.90	22.3	4.00	4/34
Shakti Gauchan	Nepal	10	6	9.80	28.4	2.07	3/2
Abhiraj Singh	Singapore	10	5	12.00	20.4	3.52	5/12

== Final placings ==
After the conclusion of the tournament the teams were distributed as follows:

Pos.	Team	Status
1st	Nepal	Promoted to Division Three for 2013
2nd	United States	Promoted to Division Three for 2013
3rd	Singapore	Remained in Division Four for 2014
4th	Denmark	Remained in Division Four for 2014
5th	Malaysia	Relegated to Division Five for 2014
6th	Tanzania	Relegated to Division Five for 2014
