= Michael Pedersen (cricketer) =

Danish cricketer (born 1986)

Personal information
- Full name: Michael Refstrup Pedersen
- Born: 1 April 1986 (age 40); Herning, Denmark
- Nickname: Pedo, Big Dog, Pup
- Height: 6 ft 3 in (1.91 m)
- Batting: Left-handed
- Bowling: Right-arm off break
- Relatives: Carsten Pedersen (brother)

International information
- National side: Denmark

Domestic team information
- Years: Team
- 2005: Denmark (squad no. 45)

Career statistics
Competition	List A	Twenty20
Matches	19	14
Runs scored	406	161
Batting average	25.37	16.10
100s/50s	1/2	0/0
Top score	121	38
Balls bowled	360	199
Wickets	2	8
Bowling average	153.50	33.37
5 wickets in innings	0	0
10 wickets in match	0	0
Best bowling	1/21	2/18
Catches/stumpings	4/–	8/–
- Source: Cricinfo, 27 January 2017

Michael Refstrup Pedersen (born 1 March 1986) is a Danish cricketer. He is a left-handed batsman who bowls right-arm off break. He was born at Herning.

== Early career ==
Having played cricket since he was nine and represented Denmark at Under-19 level, Pedersen made his full debut for Denmark in a List A match against Northamptonshire in the 2005 Cheltenham & Gloucester Trophy at Svanholm Park, Brøndby. It was an unsuccessful debut for Pedersen, with him contributing 4 runs in Denmark's total of 56, before he became one of Charl Pietersen's six wickets. Later that year, he appeared in the ICC Trophy in Ireland. The International Cricket Council afforded List A status to these matches, with him making seven appearances during the tournament. Pedersen fared moderately with the bat, scoring 76 runs at an average of 19.00, with a high score of 26.

In 2006, Pedersen joined the Marylebone Cricket Club Young Cricketer's programme. The following year, he was selected as part of Denmark's squad for the World Cricket League Division Two in Namibia, making four List A appearances during the tournament. He struggled with the bat, scoring 34 runs at an average of 8.50. In 2009, he was selected in Denmark's squad for the World Cup Qualifier in South Africa, where he made seven List A appearances, including his final appearance to date in that format, against Oman. He scored 292 runs during the tournament at average of 41.71, with a high score of 121. This was his maiden List A century and came against the Netherlands. He also made two half centuries during the tournament and ended it as Denmark's leading run-scorer, ahead of his brother Carsten who made 234 runs. Despite this, Denmark failed to qualify for the 2011 World Cup and finished the tournament in 16th and last place.

== Danish captaincy ==
In 2011, Pedersen was selected to captain Denmark's squad for the 2011 ICC World Cricket League Division Three tournament in Hong Kong, having replaced Frederik Klokker in the role. He made six appearances during the tournament, scoring 164 runs at an average of 32.80, with a high score of 78 not out. Denmark finished fifth in the tournament and were relegated to 2012 World Cricket League Division Four. Later in 2011, he captained Denmark in the European T20 Championship Division One which was held in Jersey and Guernsey, which Denmark won to qualify for the World Twenty20 Qualifier in the United Arab Emirates.

The qualifier took place in March 2012, with Pedersen retained as captain in Denmark's fourteen-man squad for the qualifier. He made his Twenty20 debut during the tournament against Bermuda at the Sharjah Cricket Association Stadium. He made seven further appearances during the competition, the last of which came against Oman. He scored a total of 108 runs during the qualifier at an average of 15.42, with a high score of 38. He also took 2 wickets, at a bowling average of 63.00 and with best figures of 1/12. Denmark once again struggled during a qualifying tournament, finishing it in 16th and last place.

In August 2012, he was selected as captain in Denmark's fourteen man squad for the World Cricket League Division Four in Malaysia.
