= Estonian cricket team in Finland in 2022 =

International cricket tour

	Finland	Estonia
- Date: 19 June 2022
Captains	Nathan Collins	Arslan Amjad

Twenty20 International series
- Results: Finland won the 2-match series 2–0
Most runs	Nathan Collins (124)	Arslan Amjad (82); Habib Khan (82)
Most wickets	Naveed Shahid (3)	Habib Khan (4)

The Estonia cricket team toured Finland in June 2022 to play two Twenty20 International (T20I) matches at the Kerava National Cricket Ground in Kerava. The series provided both sides with preparation for the 2022 ICC Men's T20 World Cup Europe sub-regional qualifier tournaments. Finland won both of the matches, winning by 23 runs and 11 runs respectively.

== Squads ==
Finland	Estonia
Nathan Collins (c); Vanraaj Padhaal (vc); Mohammad Asaduzzaman; Peter Gallagher; Muhammad Imran; Parveen Kumar; Sapan Mehta; Raaz Mohammad; Aravind Mohan (wk); Atif Rasheed; Ziaur Rehman; Jonathan Scamans (wk); Naveed Shahid; Amjad Sher; Mahesh Tambe	Arslan Amjad (c); Vimal Dwivedi; Elias Hasan; Stuart Hook (wk); Habib Khan; Maidul Islam; Murali Obili; Moshiur Rahman; Ashish Rana; Aditya Savio; MD Shoyaib; Ramesh Tanna; Marko Vaik (wk); Kalle Vislapuu

== T20I series ==
=== 1st T20I ===
19 June 2022
10:30
Scorecard

Finland; 139/6 (20 overs)	v	Estonia; 116/4 (20 overs)
Nathan Collins 45 (41); Habib Khan 2/35 (4 overs)		Habib Khan 31 (30); Mahesh Tambe 1/15 (4 overs)

Finland won by 23 runs
Kerava National Cricket Ground, Kerava
Umpires: Clyde Johnston (Est) and Debasish Roy (Fin)

- Estonia won the toss and elected to field.
- Muhammad Imran, Parveen Kumar (Fin), Arslan Amjad, Vimal Dwivedi, Elias Hasan and MD Shoyaib (Est) all made their T20I debuts.

=== 2nd T20I ===
19 June 2022
15:00
Scorecard

Finland; 182/7 (20 overs)	v	Estonia; 171/6 (20 overs)
Nathan Collins 79 (54); Habib Khan 2/25 (4 overs)		Arslan Amjad 62 (52); Naveed Shahid 3/42 (4 overs)

Finland won by 11 runs
Kerava National Cricket Ground, Kerava
Umpires: Aditya Alur (Fin) and Clyde Johnston (Est)

- Finland won the toss and elected to bat.
