= Rashid Ali (cricketer) =

Danish cricketer (born 1975)

Personal information
- Full name: Syed Rashid Ali
- Born: 1 January 1975 (age 51); Aarhus, Denmark

International information
- National side: Denmark

Domestic team information
- Years: Team
- 2005: Denmark

Career statistics
Competition	List A
Matches	5
Runs scored	40
Batting average	8.00
100s/50s	–/–
Top score	19
Balls bowled	–
Wickets	–
Bowling average	–
5 wickets in innings	–
10 wickets in match	–
Best bowling	–
Catches/stumpings	–/–
- Source: CricketArchive, 16 January 2011

Syed Rashid Ali (Urdu: سید راشد علی; born 1 January 1975) is a Danish former cricketer. He is of Pakistani descent.

Ali played two matches for Denmark Under-19s against Bermuda Under-19s and Ireland Under-19s in Canada in 1991. He made his Lisr A debut for Denmark in English domestic cricket's 2005 Cheltenham & Gloucester Trophy against Northamptonshire at Svanholm Park, Brøndby. Opening the batting with Mickey Lund, Ali was dismissed for 8 runs by Charl Pietersen, one of his seven wickets, with Denmark being dismissed for just 56. Their first-class county opponents won the match by 8 wickets. Later in 2005, he was selected in Denmark's squad for the ICC Trophy in Ireland, with the matches in the tournament having List A status. He made four List A appearances during it, against Uganda, the United States, Bermuda and Ireland. Ali scored 32 runs in the tournament, at an average of 8.00, with a high score of 19. This was the last time he played for Denmark.
