= Finnish cricket team in Denmark in 2019 =

	Denmark	Finland
- Dates: 12 – 14 July 2019
Captains	Hamid Shah	Nathan Collins

Twenty20 International series
- Results: Denmark won the 2-match series 2–0
Most runs	Zameer Khan (60)	Nathan Collins (65)
Most wickets	Musa Shaheen (3); Bashir Shah (3); Delawar Khan (3)	Md Nurul Huda (4)

The Finland cricket team toured Denmark to play a two-match Twenty20 International (T20I) series in July 2019. These were the first ever matches played by Finland to have T20I status after the International Cricket Council announced that all matches played between Associate Members after 1 January 2019 would have full T20I status. The venue for both matches was Svanholm Park in Brøndby, these being the first T20I matches to be played in Denmark. Denmark won the series 2–0.

== Squads ==
Denmark	Finland
Hamid Shah (c); Aftab Ahmed; Lucky Ali; Taranjit Bharaj; Oliver Hald; Abdul Hashmi (wk); Delawar Khan; Zameer Khan; Nicolaj Laegsgaard; Abdullah Mahmood; Ihyas Sawmy; Bashir Shah; Musa Shaheen	Nathan Collins (c); Maneesh Chauhan; Hariharan Dandapani; Peter Gallagher; Md Nurul Huda; Aravind Mohan (wk); Vanraaj Padhaal; Aniketh Pusthay; Areeb Quadir; Shoaib Qureshi; Waqas Raja; Ziaur Rehman; Tonmoy Saha; Jonathan Scamans; Amjad Sher; Sanju Shrestha; Adnan Syed

== Tour matches ==
=== 1st T20 match ===
12 July 2019
16:30
Scorecard

Finland; 76 (16.5 overs)	v	Danish Cricket Federation Academy; 80/2 (11.2 overs)
Shoaib Qureshi 37 (55); Bilal Aftab 3/14 (1.5 overs)		Taranjit Bharaj 25 (13); Hariharan Dandapani 2/25 (2 overs)

Danish Cricket Federation Academy won by 8 wickets
Svanholm Park, Brøndby
Umpires: Rasmus Kofoed (Den) and Sriharsha Kuchimanchi (Fin)

- Finland won the toss and elected to bat.

=== 2nd T20 match ===
14 July 2019
11:00
Scorecard

Danish Cricket Federation Academy; 171/4 (20 overs)	v	Finland; 96 (18.5 overs)
Delawar Khan 70 (39); Adnan Syed 2/33 (4 overs)		Jonathan Scamans 25 (27); Oliver Hald 3/10 (2 overs)

Danish Cricket Federation Academy won by 75 runs
Svanholm Park, Brøndby
Umpires: Rasmus Kofoed (Den) and Sriharsha Kuchimanchi (Fin)

- Danish Cricket Federation Academy won the toss and elected to bat.

== T20I series ==
=== 1st T20I ===
13 July 2019
11:00
Scorecard

Denmark; 117 (18.3 overs)	v	Finland; 116/7 (20 overs)
Hamid Shah 36 (18); Md Nurul Huda 3/11 (2.3 overs)		Nathan Collins 53 (62); Delawar Khan 2/21 (4 overs)

Denmark won by 1 run
Svanholm Park, Brøndby
Umpires: Jesper Jensen (Den) and Sriharsha Kuchimanchi (Fin)
Player of the match: Md Nurul Huda (Fin)

- Finland won the toss and elected to field.
- Aftab Ahmed, Lucky Ali, Zameer Khan, Abdullah Mahmood, Ihyas Sawmy (Den), Nathan Collins, Hariharan Dandapani, Md Nurul Huda, Aravind Mohan, Ziaur Rehman, Vanraaj Padhaal, Aniketh Pusthay, Areeb Quadir, Shoaib Qureshi, Tonmoy Saha and Amjad Sher (Fin) all made their T20I debuts.

=== 2nd T20I ===
13 July 2019
15:00
Scorecard

Denmark; 124/9 (20 overs)	v	Finland; 86 (18.2 overs)
Zameer Khan 33 (29); Hariharan Dandapani 2/11 (4 overs)		Amjad Sher 19 (14); Musa Shaheen 3/11 (2.2 overs)

Denmark won by 38 runs
Svanholm Park, Brøndby
Umpires: Jesper Jensen (Den) and Sriharsha Kuchimanchi (Fin)
Player of the match: Bashir Shah (Den)

- Denmark won the toss and elected to bat.
- Musa Shaheen (Den) and Waqas Raja (Fin) both made their T20I debuts.
