= Finland women's national cricket team =

Finland's women's cricket team

Finland
- Flag of Finland
- Association: Cricket Finland

International Cricket Council
- ICC status: Associate member (2017); Affiliate member (2000)
- ICC region: Europe
ICC Rankings	Current	Best-ever
T20I	71st	71st (1 Jan 2026)

T20 Internationals
- First T20I: v. Switzerland at Kerava National Cricket Ground, Kerava; 18 July 2025
- Last T20I: v. Estonia at Estonian National Cricket and Rugby Field, Tallinn; 25 July 2026
T20Is	Played	Won/Lost
Total	11	3/8 (0 ties, 0 no results)
This year	2	2/0 (0 ties, 0 no results)
T20I kit
- As of 25 July 2026

The Finland women's national cricket team represents the country of Finland in women's cricket matches.

In April 2018, the International Cricket Council (ICC) granted full Women's Twenty20 International (WT20I) status to all its members. Therefore, all Twenty20 matches played between Finland and any ICC members since 1 January 2019 have the full WT20I status.

== History ==
Sometime in 2012, Finland's women's team visited Estonia for a cricket trip against Estonian women. The venue for this cricket trip was Tallinn, Estonia. It was the first-ever international cricket tour for Finland women.

In 2023, the Finland women's team hosted 2023 Nordic Women T20 Cup. The tournament also featured teams from Sweden, Norway, Denmark and Estonia. Finland came second in the tournament, although, their matches were not counted as T20 international matches.

== Records and statistics ==
International Match Summary — Finland Women

Last updated 25 July 2026

Playing Record
Format	M	W	L	T	NR	Inaugural Match
Twenty20 Internationals	11	3	8	0	0	18 July 2025

=== Twenty20 International ===
T20I record versus other nations

Records complete to WT20I #2925. Last updated 25 July 2026.

Opponent	M	W	L	T	NR	First match	First win
ICC Associate members
Denmark	1	0	1	0	0	30 August 2025	
Estonia	4	3	1	0	0	19 July 2025	20 July 2025
Germany	1	0	1	0	0	29 August 2025	
Norway	1	0	1	0	0	30 August 2025	
Sweden	1	0	1	0	0	31 August 2025	
Switzerland	3	0	3	0	0	18 July 2025	

== See also ==
- Finland national cricket team
- List of Finland women Twenty20 International cricketers
- Cricket Finland
