= Carsten Pedersen =

Danish cricketer (born 1977)

Personal information
- Full name: Carsten Refstrup Pedersen
- Born: 18 May 1977 (age 49); Herning, Denmark
- Batting: Right-handed
- Bowling: Right-arm off break
- Relatives: Michael Pedersen (brother)

International information
- National side: Denmark

Domestic team information
- Years: Team
- 1999–2005: Denmark

Career statistics
Competition	List A
Matches	29
Runs scored	720
Batting average	26.66
100s/50s	–/5
Top score	68
Balls bowled	144
Wickets	–
Bowling average	–
5 wickets in innings	–
10 wickets in match	–
Best bowling	–
Catches/stumpings	10/–
- Source: CricketArchive, 16 January 2011

Carsten Refstrup Pedersen (born 18 May 1977) is a Danish cricketer. Pedersen is a right-handed batsman who bowls right-arm off break. He was born at Herning. His brother, Michael, has also played for and captained Denmark.

== Early career ==
Pedersen played three matches for Denmark Under-19s, against Bangladesh Under-19s in 1994, while the following year he played against Ireland Under-19s and Scotland Under-19s. He made his debut for Denmark in the 1996 European Cricket Championship against Italy, in what was his only appearance of the tournament. He made his ICC Trophy debut in the 1997 ICC Trophy in Malaysia against the United Arab Emirates, with him making a further four appearances during the tournament, scoring 40 runs in his five matches. He toured the British Isles with Denmark later in 1997, playing two matches against the Somerset Second XI and Scotland, while the following year he toured Namibia with the team, making five appearances. In 1998, Pedersen also played in the European Cricket Championship, making five appearances in the tournament. In March 1999, he toured Zimbabwe with Denmark, making appearances against provincial teams such as Mashonaland, Mashonaland Country Districts and Manicaland.

He made his List A debut for Denmark later in 1999 against the Kent Cricket Board in English domestic crickets NatWest Trophy. In 2000, he appeared in the ICC Emerging Nations Tournament in Zimbabwe, where he made a further five List A appearances against Zimbabwe A, the Netherlands, Scotland, Ireland and Kenya. Pedersen scored 145 runs at an average of 29.00, with two half centuries and a high score of 57, He featured in the 2001 ICC Trophy in Canada, making eight appearances. Pedersen generally struggled with the bat during the tournament, scoring 129 runs at an average of 16.12, though he did record a century in his second match against Hong Kong, with a score of 103. In August of that year, he made a further List A appearance in the first round of 2002 Cheltenham & Gloucester Trophy (previously the NatWest Trophy) against Suffolk. The match was played in 2001 to avoid fixture congestion in the following season. The following season, he featured in the 2002 European Championship in Northern Ireland, making five appearances.

He made a further List A appearance in the 1st round of the 2004 Cheltenham & Gloucester Trophy against Wales Minor Counties, played late in the 2003 season. He captained Denmark for the first time in the 2004 European Championship in the Netherlands, succeeding the previous captain Soren Vestergaard. The following season, he made a further List A appearance in the 2005 Cheltenham & Gloucester Trophy against Northamptonshire at Svanholm Park, Brøndby. Pedersen again captained the team, with the Danes being dismissed for just 56 in what was a heavy defeat to their first-class opponents. Later in 2005, Pedersen played in his third and final ICC Trophy during the 2005 ICC Trophy in Ireland. In a change from previous tournaments, this ICC Trophy held List A status. He captained Denmark during the tournament, making seven appearances, with him scoring 139 runs in the tournament, including a high score of 68 against the United States. In total, he represented Denmark in twenty ICC Trophy matches, scoring 308 runs at an average of 17.11.

== Later career ==
Pedersen was selected to captain Denmark in the 2006 European Championship Division One in Scotland, making four appearances. This was his last engagement as captain, with Frederik Klokker succeeding him in that role. In November 2007, he was selected in Denmark's squad for the World Cricket League Division Two in Namibia, where he made six List A appearances, helping them secure fourth place and with a place in the 2009 World Cup Qualifier. Pedersen scored 168 runs at an average of 28.00 in the tournament, with a high score of 63 against Uganda. He played for Denmark in the 2008 European Championship Division One, before being selected for Denmark's squad for the World Cup Qualifier in South Africa in 2009. Pedersen made seven List A appearances during the tournament, the last of which came against Oman. He scored 234 runs at an average of 33.42 during the tournament, with a single half century score of 58 coming against the United Arab Emirates. Denmark finished the tournament in twelfth and last place, therefore failing to qualify for the 2011 World Cup. This tournament also marked what are to date his final List A appearances for Denmark. Having played a total of 29 matches in that format for his country, Pedersen has, in the process, scored 720 runs at an average of 26.66, while also making five half centuries. He was later selected as part of Denmark's squad for the 2010 European Cricket Championship Division One in Jersey, making five appearances. Pedersen was selected as part of Denmark's squad for the 2011 ICC World Cricket League Division Three tournament in Hong Kong. He scored 150 runs in the tournament, at an average of 25.00 and with a high score of 59. Despite being Denmark's third highest run getter, they were relegated to 2012 World Cricket League Division Four. Pedersen wasn't selected in Denmark's squad for the 2012 World Twenty20 Qualifier, however, in August 2012, he was selected in Denmark's fourteen man squad for World Cricket League Division Four in Malaysia.

His brother, Michael, has also played for and captained Denmark.
