= David Court =

David Court may refer to:

- David Court (footballer) (born 1944), English footballer and coach
- David Court (bishop) (born 1958), British Anglican bishop
- David Court (cricketer) (born 1980), English cricketer
