= Cricket Finland =

Sports governing body in Finland

- Sport: Cricket
- Jurisdiction: National
- Affiliation: International Cricket Council
- Regional affiliation: ICC Europe
- (Finland)

Cricket Finland (Finnish: Suomen krikettiliito) is the official governing body of the sport of cricket in Finland. Cricket Finland is Finland's representative at the International Cricket Council (ICC) and is an associate member and has been a member of that body since 2000. It belongs to the ICC Europe region.

In July 2020, Cricket Finland won the Digital Engagement of the Year award, in the ICC's Annual Development Awards to recognise developing cricketing nations.

== History ==
Cricket in Finland has been traced back as being played in the 1850s when Royal Navy sailors played it while in port in Finland during the Crimean War. After this, cricket largely ceased being played in Finland until the 1960s when the British Embassy started promoting cricket between British diplomatic staff and local Finns. In 1972, Helsinki Cricket Club, the first local cricket club independent of British influence, was founded. The Finnish Cricket Association was founded in 1999 by Andrew Armitage, a British former banker, as a way to formalise cricket within Finland. It was granted International Cricket Council Affiliate membership the following year. The sport then gained official recognition by the Finnish Government as a result. By 2004, the Finnish Cricket Association had 23 affiliated cricket clubs.

In the 2010s, the Finnish Cricket Association invested in facilities to assist with the growth of cricket. This led to the opening of the Kerava National Cricket Ground in 2014 as well as Finland's first indoor cricket training facility at Eerikkilä in Tammela in 2019. In 2020, Cricket Finland was due to host the 2021 Men's T20 World Cup Europe Qualifier Group B, but due to the COVID-19 pandemic in Finland, the qualifying tournament was cancelled. In 2023, Cricket Finland were awarded the ICC Digital Engagement Award for live streaming cricket matches in partnership with Yle and the Finnish Olympic Committee. This came after a previous partnership with the European Cricket Network in 2020 to broadcast the Finnish Premier League.

== See also ==
- Finland national cricket team
- Finland women's national cricket team
