= Darren Treumer =

Australian cricketer

Personal information
- Full name: Darren Leigh Treumer
- Born: 23 November 1971 (age 54); Australia
- Batting: Right-handed
- Role: Wicket-keeper

Domestic team information
- Years: Team
- 2005: Denmark

Career statistics
Competition	List A
Matches	1
Runs scored	7
Batting average	7.00
100s/50s	–/–
Top score	7
Balls bowled	–
Wickets	–
Bowling average	–
5 wickets in innings	–
10 wickets in match	–
Best bowling	–
Catches/stumpings	2/–
- Source: CricketArchive, 15 January 2011

Darren Leigh Treumer (23 November 1971) is a former Australian cricketer. Treumer was a right-handed batsman who played as a wicket-keeper.

After over a decade of representing Northern Territories in Australia, Treumer played a single List A match as an overseas player for Denmark in the 1st round of the 2005 Cheltenham & Gloucester Trophy against Northamptonshire. In his only List A appearance, he scored 7 runs before being dismissed by Charl Pietersen. Behind the stumps he took 2 catches.
