= Jono Whitney =

English cricketer

Personal information
- Full name: Jonathan David Whitney
- Born: 7 April 1985 (age 41); Bridgnorth, Shropshire, England
- Nickname: Jono
- Batting: Right-handed
- Bowling: Right-arm fast-medium

Domestic team information
- Years: Team
- 2003–2013: Shropshire

Career statistics
Competition	List A
Matches	1
Runs scored	39
Batting average	39.00
100s/50s	–/–
Top score	39
Balls bowled	36
Wickets	1
Bowling average	26.00
5 wickets in innings	–
10 wickets in match	–
Best bowling	1/26
Catches/stumpings	–/–
- Source: Cricinfo, 3 January 2021

Jonathan 'Jono' David Whitney (born 7 April 1985) is an English former cricketer.

Born at Bridgnorth and educated at Oldbury Wells School, Whitney made his debut for Shropshire in minor counties cricket in the 2003 Minor Counties Championship. He played for Shropshire until 2013, making 96 appearances for the county, 58 of which came in the Minor Counties Championship. An all rounder, he scored 2,676 runs in the Minor Counties Championship at an average of 32.60, in addition to taking 79 wickets at 33 apiece with his right-arm fast-medium bowling. In the MCCA Knockout Trophy, he scored 903 runs at an average of 24.40 and claimed 25 wickets at an average of 28.80. In addition to playing minor counties cricket, Whitney also played a single List A one-day match for Shropshire when they were permitted to take part in the domestic one-day competition alongside the first-class counties. His only List A appearance came against Hampshire at Whitchurch in the 2005 Cheltenham & Gloucester Trophy. He top-scored in Shropshire's innings of 132 all out with a counter-attacking 39, before being dismissed by Shane Warne. He took the wicket of Derek Kenway in Hampshire's reply, with figures of 1 for 26 from six overs. He was considered by his former captain Guy Home to have been unfortunate not to play at first-class level.

He stopped playing for Shropshire in 2013, when he emigrated to Bunbury in Western Australia with his partner, Yvonne, and their daughter.
