= Matthew Tilt =

English cricketer (born 1981)

Personal information
- Full name: Matthew Arthur Tilt
- Born: 25 July 1981 (age 45); Shrewsbury, Shropshire, England
- Batting: Right-handed
- Role: Wicket-keeper

Domestic team information
- Years: Team
- 1999–2011: Shropshire

Career statistics
Competition	List A
Matches	7
Runs scored	4
Batting average	1.33
100s/50s	–/–
Top score	3
Catches/stumpings	8/4
- Source: Cricinfo, 2 July 2011

Matthew Arthur Tilt (born 25 July 1981) is an English former cricketer. Tilt is a right-handed batsman who fields as a wicket-keeper. He was born in Shrewsbury, Shropshire.

Tilt made his debut for Shropshire in the 1999 Minor Counties Championship against Devon. Tilt played Minor counties cricket for Shropshire from 1999 to present, which has included 53 Minor Counties Championship appearances and 29 MCCA Knockout Trophy appearances. He made his List A debut against Ireland in the 2000 NatWest Trophy. He made 6 further List A appearances, the last of which came against Hampshire in the 2005 Cheltenham & Gloucester Trophy. In his 7 List A matches, he scored 4 runs at an average of 1.33, with a high score of 3. Behind the stumps he took 8 catches and made 4 stumpings.
