= Aftab Ahmed (cricketer, born 1990) =

Danish cricketer

Personal information
- Full name: Aftab Ahmed
- Born: 22 March 1990 (age 36); Denmark
- Batting: Right-handed
- Bowling: Right-arm medium
- Role: Allrounder

International information
- National side: Denmark (2019-)
- T20I debut (cap 16): 13 July 2019 v Finland
- Last T20I: 15 August 2021 v Sweden

Domestic team information
- Years: Team
- Glostrup Cricket Club KB Cricket Club

Career statistics
Competition	Twenty20
Matches	18
Runs scored	191
Batting average	12.73
100s/50s	0/0
Top score	39
Balls bowled	258
Wickets	11
Bowling average	30.27
5 wickets in innings	1
10 wickets in match	–
Best bowling	6/22
Catches/stumpings	4/–
- Source: Cricinfo, 18 February 2023

Aftab Ahmed (Urdu: آفتاب احمد; born 22 March 1990) is a Danish cricketer. Ahmed is a right-handed batsman who bowls right-arm medium pace. He is the older brother of Shehzad Ahmed.

== Career ==
Having represented Denmark at the Under-19 level, Ahmed was selected for Denmark's senior squad for the 2011 World Cricket League Division Three in Hong Kong, making his full international debut against Italy. He made a total of six appearances during the tournament, before later that year playing in the European T20 Championship Division One which was held in Jersey and Guernsey.

In March 2012, Denmark took part in the World Twenty20 Qualifier in the United Arab Emirates, having qualified for the event by winning the European T20 Championship. Ahmed was selected in Denmark's fourteen-man squad for the qualifier, making his Twenty20 debut against Bermuda at the Sharjah Cricket Association Stadium. He made seven further appearances during the competition, the last of which came against Oman, scoring 120 runs at an average of 17.14, with a high score of 37. With the ball, he took 8 wickets in the competition at an average of 19.87, with best figures of 6/22. These figures came against Papua New Guinea and are the seventh best figures in Twenty20 cricket.

In August 2012, he was selected in Denmark's fourteen-man squad for the World Cricket League Division Four in Malaysia.

He made his Twenty20 International (T20I) debut for Denmark against Finland in a bilateral series on 13 July 2019.
