= Andrew Trott =

English cricketer

Personal information
- Full name: Andrew James Trott
- Born: 26 September 1968 (age 58); Wellingborough, Northamptonshire, England
- Batting: Right-handed
- Bowling: Leg break

Domestic team information
- Years: Team
- 1995–2008: Bedfordshire

Career statistics
Competition	List A
Matches	11
Runs scored	178
Batting average	25.42
100s/50s	0/0
Top score	41*
Balls bowled	234
Wickets	4
Bowling average	58.50
5 wickets in innings	0
10 wickets in match	0
Best bowling	1/17
Catches/stumpings	0/–
- Source: Cricinfo, 15 April 2011

Andrew James Trott (born 26 September 1968) is a former English cricketer. Trott was a right-handed batsman who bowled leg break. He was born in Wellingborough, Northamptonshire and educated at Bedford Modern School.

Trott made his debut for Bedfordshire in the 1995 MCCA Knockout Trophy against Buckinghamshire. Trott played Minor counties cricket for Bedfordshire from 1995 to 2008, including 54 Minor Counties Championship matches and 33 MCCA Knockout Trophy matches. In 1997, he made his List A debut against Glamorgan in the NatWest Trophy. He played ten further List A matches for Bedfordshire, the last coming against Sussex in the 2005 Cheltenham & Gloucester Trophy. In his eleven List A matches, he scored 178 runs at a batting average of 25.42, with a high score of 41*. His highest score came against Devon in 2001. With the ball he took 4 wickets at a bowling average of 58.50, with best figures of 1/17.
