= Kevin Nash (cricketer) =

English cricketer (born 1975)

Personal information
- Full name: Kevin John Nash
- Born: 19 October 1975 (age 51); Derby, Derbyshire, England
- Batting: Right-handed
- Bowling: Right-arm fast-medium

Domestic team information
- Years: Team
- 1999–2005: Wiltshire
- 1995–1997: Dorset

Career statistics
Competition	LA
Matches	6
Runs scored	29
Batting average	9.66
100s/50s	–/–
Top score	17
Balls bowled	317
Wickets	8
Bowling average	28.00
5 wickets in innings	–
10 wickets in match	–
Best bowling	4/46
Catches/stumpings	–/–
- Source: Cricinfo, 10 October 2010

Kevin John Nash (born 19 October 1975) is an English cricketer. Nash was a right-handed batsman who bowled right-arm fast-medium. He was born in Derby, Derbyshire.

Nash made his debut in the Minor Counties Championship for Dorset in the 1995 against Herefordshire. From 1995 to 1997, he represented the county in 6 Minor Counties Championship matches, the last of which came against Cheshire. He also represented Dorset in the MCCA Knockout Trophy. His debut for Dorset in that competition came against Shropshire. This was the only Trophy match he represented the county in.

In 1999, Nash joined Wiltshire where he made his Minor Counties Championship debut for the county against Herefordshire. From 1999 to 2005, he represented the county in 25 Minor Counties Championship matches, the last of which came against Berkshire. Nash also represented Wiltshire in the MCCA Knockout Trophy, making his debut for the county in that competition against the Warwickshire Cricket Board in 1999. From 1999 to 2005, he represented the county in 14 Trophy matches, the last of which came against Cornwall.

Nash also represented Wiltshire in List A cricket. His List A debut for the county came against Scotland in the 2000 NatWest Trophy. From 1999 to 2005, he represented the county in 6 List A matches, the last of which came against Kent in the 2005 Cheltenham & Gloucester Trophy. In his 6 List A matches, he scored 29 runs at a batting average of 9.66, with a high score of 17. With the ball he took 8 wickets at a bowling average of 28.00, with best figures of 4/46.
