= David Follett (cricketer) =

English cricketer (born 1968)

Personal information
- Full name: David Follett
- Born: 14 October 1968 (age 58); Newcastle-under-Lyme, Staffordshire, England
- Batting: Right-handed
- Bowling: Right-arm fast-medium

Domestic team information
- Years: Team
- 2000–2005: Staffordshire
- 1997–1999: Northamptonshire
- 1995–1996: Middlesex
- 1994: Staffordshire

Career statistics
Competition	First-class	List A
Matches	18	36
Runs scored	87	44
Batting average	6.21	11.00
100s/50s	–/–	–/–
Top score	19	10*
Balls bowled	2,549	1,701
Wickets	44	57
Bowling average	34.29	23.15
5 wickets in innings	3	–
10 wickets in match	1	–
Best bowling	8/22	4/17
Catches/stumpings	5/–	10/–
- Source: Cricinfo, 22 June 2011

David Follett (born 14 October 1968) is an English former cricketer. Follett was a right-handed batsman who bowled right-arm fast-medium. He was born in Newcastle-under-Lyme, Staffordshire.

== Early career and Middlesex ==
A later starter in county cricket, Follett made his debut in county cricket for Staffordshire in 1994, playing Minor counties cricket for the county in that season, before joining Middlesex the following season. His debut for the county came against Hampshire in the 1995 Benson & Hedges Cup, which also marked his debut List A match. It was in 1995 that he also made his first-class debut, against Warwickshire in what was his only appearance on that seasons County Championship. Indeed, in the following season Follett was used infrequently in first-class cricket, making 6 further appearances. Despite his limited appearances, as a brisk right-arm bowler, Follett performed respectably with the ball, claiming 24 wickets at an average of 28.50, with best figures of 8/22. On 3 occasions he took a five wicket haul, with his best figures of 8/22 coming against Durham in 1996: he took 2 wickets in the Durham first-innings, while in their second-innings, his 8 wicket haul helped dismiss Durham for a paltry 67, thus giving him his only ten wicket haul in a match and propelling Middlesex to a huge 306 run win. However, a shin injury in that season limited his appearances for the remainder of that season.

He was though used more in List A cricket by Middlesex, making 11 appearances for Middlesex. His 11 List A appearances yielded him 12 wickets, which came at an average of 33.75. His best bowling figures of 2/27 came in the 1995 season, a season in which his 6 wickets that year cost 21.16 a piece, whereas the following season he form dipped, with his 6 wickets that year cost 46.33 a piece. Follett left Middlesex at the end of the 1996 season.

== Northamptonshire and after ==
He joined Northamptonshire for domestic reasons for the 1997 season, making his debut for the county in that seasons AXA Life League against Warwickshire, a season in which he took 13 wickets in that format an average of 19.84, which included his then best figures of 4/39. He played his first County Championship match for the county in that season, against former county Middlesex. He would go on to play 11 first-class matches for Northamptonshire, spread over 3 seasons, with his final appearance coming against Derbyshire in the 1999 County Championship. He found his wickets harder to come by at the County Ground, taking 20 wickets at an average of 41.25, with best figures of 3/48. Used more often in List A cricket, Follett made 18 limited-overs appearances for the county, during which he took 29 wickets at an average of 23.82. However, further injuries limited his appearances for Northamptonshire: Follett didn't feature in List A cricket in 1999, instead playing a handful first-class cricket. He left Northamptonshire at the end of that season.

Resuming his injury hit career with Staffordshire, where he had begun in county cricket in 1994, Follett played Minor counties cricket from 2000 to 2005 for the county, making 24 further Minor Counties Championship appearances and 9 further MCCA Knockout Trophy appearances. Playing his first List A fixture for Staffordshire in the 2000 NatWest Trophy against the Somerset Cricket Board, Follett would go on to play 7 further fixtures in that format for the county, with his last List A match coming against Surrey in the 2005 Cheltenham & Gloucester Trophy. His bowling record in List A cricket was at its best for Staffordshire, with his 16 wickets coming at an impressive average of exactly 14. In the 2002 Cheltenham & Gloucester Trophy match against Hertfordshire, he took his career with limited-overs bowling figures of 4/17.
