= List of Finland women Twenty20 International cricketers =

This is a list of Finnish women Twenty20 International cricketers. A Twenty20 International is an international cricket match between two representative teams, each having Twenty20 International status, as determined by the International Cricket Council (ICC). A Twenty20 International is played under the rules of Twenty20 cricket.

This list includes all players who have played at least one T20I match for Finland and is arranged in the order of debut appearance. Where more than one player won their first cap in the same match, those players are initially listed alphabetically at the time of debut.

Finland women's team will play their first WT20I match against Switzerland on 18 July 2025 during their 2025 Finland Women's Tri-Nation Series.

== Key ==
General

- ‡ – Captain
- † – Wicket-keeper
- First – Year of debut
- Last – Year of latest game
- Mat – Number of matches played

Batting

- Runs – Runs scored in career
- HS – Highest score
- 50 – Number of half centuries
- Avg – Runs scored per dismissal
- * – Batter remained not out

Bowling

- Wkt – Wickets taken in career
- BBI – Best bowling in an innings
- Ave – Average runs per wicket

Fielding

- Ca – Catches taken
- St – Stumpings affected

== List of Players ==
Statistics are correct as of 25 July 2026.

Finland women T20I cricketers
General					Batting				Bowling				Fielding		Ref
No.	Name	First	Last	Mat	Runs	HS	Avg	50	Balls	Wkt	BBI	Ave	Ca	St	Ref
1	Praghati Bhandari	2025	2025	8	2	2	0.50	0	101	5	2/17	18.80	1	0	
2	Malyun Hassan	2025	2026	7	18	11	6.00	0	87	6	2/9	13.66	4	0	
3	Aanchal Khullar	2025	2026	11	65	26	8.12	0	106	4	1/0	26.75	1	0	
4	Rhea Khullar	2025	2025	9	65	26	8.12	0	88	3	1/20	34.66	1	0	
5	Leah Martin	2025	2026	7	26	12*	8.66	0	88	2	1/22	47.00	2	0	
6	Traijila Mulepati‡	2025	2026	11	93	31	10.33	0	174	13	4/9	8.69	4	0	
7	Haiyen Nguyen†	2025	2026	11	67	18*	16.75	0	50	1	1/19	74.00	4	1	
8	Mira Saastamoinen	2025	2025	9	23	11	5.75	0	72	0	–	–	1	0	
9	Stella Sheridan†	2025	2026	11	166	39*	18.44	0	24	0	–	–	5	0	
10	Minna Stolt	2025	2026	11	14	5	2.33	0	–	–	–	–	1	0	
11	Divija Unhale	2025	2025	9	194	41	24.25	0	186	4	1/12	35.25	2	0	
12	Hansika Dassanayake	2025	2025	3	1	1	0.50	0	18	0	–	–	0	0	
13	Tiina Leskinen	2025	2026	2	2	1*	1*	0	–	–	–	–	0	0	
14	Mari Kojo	2025	2026	6	5	5*	5.00	0	78	3	2/15	22.00	1	0	
15	Abinaya Shanmuganathan	2025	2025	1	–	–	–	–	–	–	–	–	0	0	
16	Elina Rama	2026	2026	2	2	5*	5.00	0	30	2	2/11	10.50	1	0	
17	Mira Kaitaranta	2026	2026	2	–	–	–	–	12	0	–	–	0	0	
18	Magdalena Kijonkova	2026	2026	1	–	–	–	–	–	–	–	–	0	0	
