= Oldbury Wells School =

Location
- Oldbury Wells; Bridgnorth, Shropshire, WV16 5JD; England
- 52°31′50″N 2°25′36″W

Information
- Type: Academy
- Motto: Aspire, Enjoy, Achieve.
- Local authority: Shropshire
- Department for Education URN: 142153 Tables
- Ofsted: Reports
- Headteacher: Adam Walker
- Gender: Coeducational
- Age: 11 to 16.
- Houses: Castle (Red), Friary (Green), Northgate (Blue), Westgate (Yellow)
- Website: www.oldburywells.com

Oldbury Wells School is a coeducational secondary school located in Bridgnorth, England. having 800 pupils. The school's motto is "Aspire, Enjoy, Achieve."

== History ==
The buildings in which Oldbury Wells School is today based were originally two separate schools. What is now known as the East Side was opened as Bridgnorth Boys’ Modern School in 1958; the West Side opened as Bridgnorth Girls’ Modern School in 1959. The two schools merged to form Oldbury Wells during 1973/4. This gives the school its somewhat strange characteristic of being split over two sites separated by a quiet cul-de-sac. The gymnasium facilities for the separate sexes still remain on their original designated sites; east for the boys and west for the girls.

The school's intake covers a wide and mostly rural geographic area around the Severn Valley, and has the notable statistic that more than three-quarters of the pupils are bussed in from surrounding villages.

== East Building ==
Oldbury Wells School was granted Grade II listed building status in 1983. It was put onto the register of listed buildings due to its design and the construction methods used.

The architects were the London practice Lyons, Israel and Ellis. They were a company who produced buildings which were consistent and recognisable. They built schools but also completed projects of national significance such as the Wolfson Institute and the then Polytechnic of Central London.

The building design has its origins in the “Modern Movement” and this was combined with Dutch and Scandinavian modernism to produce what is now Oldbury Wells. The outlines of their buildings were often developed quickly – the divided blocks were linked by linear corridors but development could be quite protracted with weeks being devoted to details such as a gate or window style.

The East Side (Bridgnorth Boy’s Secondary Modern School) was built in 1958. The assistant working on the project was P. Yarker; the structural consultants were Ove Arup and the main contractor was A.H. Guest.

The assembly hall formed the heart of the building – it was enclosed by offices, cloakrooms and toilets on the ground floor, with teaching rooms above. This unit was linked to a science block and a handicraft block with the gymnasium added later. The building has an exposed reinforced concrete frame. Suspended floors have prestressed concrete beams with foam slag infill panels. Roofs were timber units with cork and three layers of felt. The windows had varnished Columbian pine frames with metal projector opening lights. Brickwork was used inside and outside of the building and left unfaced. The outer walls were also, in places, faced with precast concrete slabs with white marble aggregate.

== West Building ==
The West Side (Bridgnorth Girl’s Secondary Modern School) was built in 1960. The assistants working on the project were P. Yarker and A. Colquhoun; the structural consultants were Ove Arup and the main contractor was A.H. Guest.

The building was designed for later extension by the addition of the gymnasium and further classrooms. The plan of the building was a long rectangle containing all but the craft rooms (a separate single storey block) and the kitchen. The southern part of the building consisted of the assembly and group instruction areas, with classrooms to the north. The entrance hall contains the main staircase – the glass wall here was set back to form a deep double height porch. The associated boiler flue and tank room were positioned to give the shortest possible service runs and to give emphasis to the entrance. The structural concrete was left exposed both inside and outside the building. Internal partitions were plastered and painted white but small areas of primary colour were placed at significant points throughout the building. The outer walls and window frames were designed with a complexity to act as a foil to the overall grid structure and to allow the spaces behind to flow across the building.

The west building has classrooms for maths, drama, geography, music, French, PHSE, RE, computer science and art.

== Awards and accolades ==
The school's buildings were listed during the 1990s. They were deemed to be of historical interest because of the way the concrete displays the grain of the wood shuttering into which it was poured. It was one of the first modern buildings to be built solely out of concrete.

It became a Science College in 2003, which sees it gain extra funding in return for developing science facilities and teaching for the benefit of its pupils and the wider community. The school won redesignation as a Science College again in 2007. The school was ranked 12th in 2008 in the most improved schools league tables.

== 6th Form ==
Oldbury is part of the Bridgnorth Sixth Form Partnership which allows students from Bridgnorth Endowed School to take subjects based at Oldbury. Endowed stopped providing sixth-form courses in 2019.

In 2023, the school launched a consultation on the possible closure of the Sixth Form, which would mean the end of further education in the town.

== Notable alumni ==
- Colin Hemsley (born 1949) - cricketer
- Jono Whitney (born 1985) – cricketer
