= Colin Hemsley =

English cricketer (born 1949)

Colin Ronald Hemsley (born 11 August 1949) is an English former cricketer. He was a right-handed batsman and right-arm medium-pace bowler who played for Shropshire. He was born in Highley, Shropshire, and educated at Oldbury Wells School, Bridgnorth.

Hemsley represented Shropshire in the Minor Counties Championship between 1966 and 1983, as well as playing for Worcestershire Second XI, while playing at club level for Bridgnorth and Old Hill. His sole List A appearance came in the 1976 Gillette Cup, against Yorkshire. Hemsley scored 4 runs in the match, and took figures of 0-13 from three overs of bowling.

Hemsley also played soccer for Shrewsbury Town reserves.
