= Henrik Øre =

Danish cricketer (born 1979)

Personal information
- Full name: Henrik Bjerre Øre
- Born: 12 August 1979 (age 47); Esbjerg, Ribe County, Denmark
- Batting: Left-handed
- Bowling: Left-arm medium

Domestic team information
- Years: Team
- 2005: Denmark

Career statistics
Competition	List A
Matches	1
Runs scored	0
Batting average	0.00
100s/50s	–/–
Top score	0
Balls bowled	42
Wickets	1
Bowling average	28.00
5 wickets in innings	–
10 wickets in match	–
Best bowling	1/28
Catches/stumpings	–/–
- Source: Cricinfo, 14 January 2011

Henrik Bjerre Øre (born 12 August 1979) is a former Danish cricketer. Øre is a left-handed batsman who bowls left-arm medium pace. He was born at Esbjerg, Ribe County.

Øre played a single List A fixture for Denmark in the 2005 Cheltenham & Gloucester Trophy against Northamptonshire. In his only List A appearance, he was dismissed for a duck by Charl Pietersen and with the ball he took a single wicket at a cost of 28 runs.
