= Stephen Humble =

English cricketer (born 1977)

Personal information
- Full name: Stephen Humble
- Born: 3 January 1977 (age 49); Hexham, Northumberland, England
- Nickname: FOS (Funny Owld Steve)
- Batting: Right-handed
- Bowling: Right-arm medium

Domestic team information
- Years: Team
- 2003–2008: Northumberland
- 2001–2002: Durham Cricket Board

Career statistics
Competition	LA
Matches	3
Runs scored	93
Batting average	46.50
100s/50s	–/1
Top score	88*
Balls bowled	126
Wickets	5
Bowling average	20.40
5 wickets in innings	–
10 wickets in match	–
Best bowling	3/33
Catches/stumpings	1/–
- Source: Cricinfo, 6 November 2010

Stephen Humble (born 3 January 1977) is an English cricketer. Humble is a right-handed batsman who bowls right-arm medium pace. He was born at Hexham, Northumberland.

Humble made his debut in List A cricket for the Durham Cricket Board, playing 2 matches for the team against Hertfordshire in the 2001 Cheltenham & Gloucester Trophy and Herefordshire in 2nd round of the 2003 Cheltenham & Gloucester Trophy which was held in 2002.

Humble joined Northumberland in 2003, making his debut for the county in the Minor Counties Championship against Staffordshire. From 2003 to 2006, he represented the county in 14 Championship matches, the last of which came against Cumberland. Humble also represented the county in the MCCA Knockout Trophy. His debut Trophy match for the county came against Lincolnshire in 2003. From 2003 to 2008, he represented the county in 12 Trophy matches, the last of which came against Suffolk. He also played a single List A match for the county against Middlesex in the 2005 Cheltenham & Gloucester Trophy.

In his 3 career List A matches, he scored 93 runs at a batting average of 46.50, with a single half century high score of 88*. In the field he took a single catch. With the ball he took 5 wickets at a bowling average of 20.40, with best figures of 3/33.

He lives in North Gosforth.
