= List of Finland Twenty20 International cricketers =

This is a list of Finnish Twenty20 International cricketers.

In April 2018, the ICC decided to grant full Twenty20 International (T20I) status to all its members. Therefore, all Twenty20 matches played between Finland and other ICC members after 1 January 2019 will be eligible for T20I status.

This list comprises all members of the Finland cricket team who have played at least one T20I match. It is initially arranged in the order in which each player won his first Twenty20 cap. Where more than one player won their first Twenty20 cap in the same match, those players are listed alphabetically by surname.

== Key ==
General

- ‡ – Captain
- † – Wicket-keeper
- First – Year of debut
- Last – Year of latest game
- Mat – Number of matches played

Batting

- Runs – Runs scored in career
- HS – Highest score
- 50 – Half-centuries scored
- Avg – Runs scored per dismissal
- * – Batsman remained not out

Bowling

- Balls – Balls bowled in career
- Wkt – Wickets taken in career
- BBI – Best bowling in an innings
- Ave – Average runs per wicket

Fielding

- Ca – Catches taken
- St – Stumpings affected

== List of players ==
Statistics are correct as of 21 August 2026.

Finland T20I cricketers
General					Batting				Bowling				Fielding		Ref
No.	Name	First	Last	Mat	Runs	HS	Avg	50	Balls	Wkt	BBI	Ave	Ca	St	Ref
1	Amjad Sher‡	2019	2026	56	479	37*	11.68	0	1222	67	4/12	19.01	21	0	
2	Areeb Quadir†	2019	2024	5	19	14	4.74	0	–	–	–	–	4	2	
3	Nathan Collins‡	2019	2023	24	604	79	26.26	4	–	–	–	–	3	0	
4	Hariharan Dandapani	2019	2024	7	25	17	12.50	0	132	7	2/6	21.85	1	0	
5	Md Nurul Huda	2019	2019	5	50	30*	25.00	0	99	9	3/11	13.11	4	0	
6	Aravind Mohan†	2019	2026	40	732	71	19.78	5	–	–	–	–	19	3	
7	Vanraaj Padhaal	2019	2026	45	619	84	15.47	2	6	0	–	–	7	0	
8	Aniketh Pusthay	2019	2026	30	357	56	12.75	1	160	9	2/15	24.33	11	0	
9	Tonmoy Saha	2019	2019	4	26	18*	26.00	0	60	2	1/22	44.00	0	0	
10	Shoaib Qureshi	2019	2019	5	27	12	6.75	0	82	6	2/22	18.16	2	0	
11	Ziaur Rehman	2019	2024	10	106	37*	13.25	0	6	0	–	–	1	0	
12	Waqas Raja	2019	2019	1	2	2*	–	0	6	0	–	–	0	0	
13	Maneesh Chauhan	2019	2019	2	16	15	8.00	0	48	3	2/16	12.66	0	0	
14	Peter Gallagher	2019	2023	22	238	36	12.52	0	431	24	3/17	18.37	12	0	
15	Jonathan Scamans†	2019	2024	18	166	28	11.85	0	–	–	–	–	10	2	
16	Naveed Shahid	2021	2022	6	12	12*	–	0	108	6	3/42	23.83	1	0	
17	Raaz Mohammad	2021	2025	23	31	9*	15.50	0	410	25	4/7	18.92	5	0	
18	Mahesh Tambe	2021	2026	35	157	31*	9.23	0	644	34	5/19	22.35	15	0	
19	Adnan Syed	2021	2021	2	–	–	–	–	25	0	–	–	0	0	
20	Mohammad Asaduzzaman	2022	2022	9	1	1*	1.00	0	186	5	2/23	43.60	1	0	
21	Sapan Mehta	2022	2022	5	74	33	14.80	0	6	0	–	–	0	0	
22	Atif Rasheed	2022	2025	19	295	43	17.35	0	53	5	4/13	12.60	6	0	
23	Matias Brasier	2022	2023	3	2	1*	1.00	0	41	1	1/34	79.00	0	0	
24	Muhammad Imran	2022	2022	1	–	–	–	–	24	1	1/16	16.00	1	0	
25	Parveen Kumar	2022	2024	7	15	11	3.75	0	122	7	3/30	21.57	0	0	
26	Matthew Jenkinson	2022	2023	5	89	34	17.80	0	36	2	2/11	25.50	1	0	
27	Akhil Arjunan	2023	2026	21	131	24*	11.90	0	383	17	4/34	26.17	4	0	
28	Jordan O'Brien†	2023	2026	28	323	56*	13.45	1	–	–	–	–	26	5	
29	Faheem Nellancheri	2023	2026	27	354	44	16.09	0	–	–	–	–	5	0	
30	Sumit Singh	2023	2023	2	9	7	4.50	0	24	1	1/18	39.00	2	0	
31	Ghulam Abbas Butt	2024	2025	14	151	44	10.78	0	120	4	2/30	30.75	2	0	
32	Nicholas Salonen	2024	2026	31	354	44	14.16	0	513	29	4/45	20.44	17	0	
33	Ekhpelwak Kuchey	2024	2025	6	15	14*	7.50	0	66	0	–	–	4	0	
34	Faraaz Mehti Abbas	2025	2026	23	475	57	22.61	2	71	2	1/13	44.00	6	0	
35	Madhawa Basnayaka	2025	2026	9	73	20*	14.60	0	132	10	4/27	19.10	2	0	
36	Pavan Arachchige	2025	2026	8	34	24	6.80	0	78	4	2/36	23.50	0	0	
37	Junaid Khan	2025	2026	15	38	19*	19.00	0	294	18	2/8	16.72	4	0	
38	Lukas Ruane	2025	2025	1	1	1	1.00	0	–	–	–	–	0	0	
39	Hammadullah Shinwari	2026	2026	14	26	5*	3.25	0	281	21	6/7	13.57	8	0	
40	Kaif Jamadar	2026	2026	6	83	48	13.83	0	–	–	–	–	4	0	
41	Zahidullah Kamal	2026	2026	13	156	44	14.18	0	6	0	–	–	6	0	
42	Piumal Karunarathna	2026	2026	9	50	16	12.50	0	177	10	4/23	20.60	1	0	
