= Spanish cricket team in Finland in 2019 =

	Finland	Spain
- Dates: 16 – 18 August 2019
Captains	Nathan Collins	Christian Munoz-Mills

Twenty20 International series
- Results: Spain won the 3-match series 2–1
Most runs	Nathan Collins (86)	Ravi Panchal (126)
Most wickets	Md Nurul Huda (5); Shoaib Qureshi (5)	Paul Hennessy (6); Ravi Panchal (6)

The Spain cricket team toured Finland in August 2019 to play a three-match Twenty20 International (T20I) series. These matches had T20I status after the International Cricket Council announced that all matches played between Associate Members after 1 January 2019 would have full T20I status. These were the first T20I matches to be played in Finland. In February 2019, Cricket Finland and Cricket España announced that the series would be hosted at the Kerava National Cricket Ground in August 2019, with Spain agreeing to host a return series against Finland in spring 2020.

After the first day of the T20I series, the teams were tied at one win apiece. Finland recorded their first T20I victory in the opening match by a comfortable 82-run margin, before Spain levelled the series with a 6-wicket win in the second match. On the second day, Spain won the final match by successfully chasing down the Finnish total of 158 with two balls to spare, sealing a 4-wicket victory to take the series 2–1.

== Squads ==
Finland	Spain
Nathan Collins (c); Maneesh Chauhan; Hariharan Dandapani; Peter Gallagher; Abdul Ghafar; Md Nurul Huda; Aravind Mohan (wk); Vanraaj Padhaal; Aniketh Pusthay; Shoaib Qureshi; Tonmoy Saha; Jonathan Scamans (wk); Amjad Sher; Sanju Shrestha	Christian Munoz-Mills (c); Faran Afzal; Awais Ahmed (wk); Yasir Ali; Muhammad Asjed; Hamza Dar; Zulqarnain Haider; Paul Hennessy; Kuldeep Lal; Vinod Kumar; Atif Mehmood; Ravi Panchal; Tom Vine

== Tour match ==
=== 20-over match: Finland Development XI vs Spain XI ===
16 August 2019
17:00 (D/N)
Scorecard

Finland Development XI; 117/8 (20 overs)	v	Spain XI; 118/3 (15.2 overs)
Maneesh Chauhan 26 (31); Paul Hennessy 2/10 (2 overs)		Christian Munoz-Mills 33 (20); Khalid Mangal 1/1 (0.2 overs)

Spain XI won by 7 wickets
Kerava National Cricket Ground, Kerava
Umpires: Humayun Mughal (Fin) and Manoj Thavayogarajah (Fin)

- Spain XI won the toss and elected to field.

== T20I series ==
=== 1st T20I ===
17 August 2019
11:00
Scorecard

Finland; 185/8 (20 overs)	v	Spain; 103 (15 overs)
Aravind Mohan 41 (27); Paul Hennessy 2/23 (3 overs)		Kuldeep Lal 23 (14); Hariharan Dandapani 2/6 (1 over)

Finland won by 82 runs
Kerava National Cricket Ground, Kerava
Umpires: Sriharsha Kuchimanchi (Fin) and Srinidhi Ravindra (Fin)

- Finland won the toss and elected to bat.
- Maneesh Chauhan, Peter Gallagher, Jonathan Scamans (Fin), Hamza Dar and Vinod Kumar (Esp) all made their T20I debuts.

=== 2nd T20I ===
17 August 2019
15:30
Scorecard

Finland; 135/8 (20 overs)	v	Spain; 141/4 (19 overs)
Md Nurul Huda 30* (14); Ravi Panchal 3/22 (4 overs)		Yasir Ali 37* (36); Md Nurul Huda 2/26 (4 overs)

Spain won by 6 wickets
Kerava National Cricket Ground, Kerava
Umpires: Humayun Mughal (Fin) and Srinidhi Ravindra (Fin)

- Finland won the toss and elected to bat.

=== 3rd T20I ===
18 August 2019
11:00
Scorecard

Finland; 158/8 (20 overs)	v	Spain; 159/6 (19.4 overs)
Nathan Collins 56 (50); Paul Hennessy 3/27 (4 overs)		Ravi Panchal 71* (54); Amjad Sher 2/22 (4 overs)

Spain won by 4 wickets
Kerava National Cricket Ground, Kerava
Umpires: Sriharsha Kuchimanchi (Fin) and Srinidhi Ravindra (Fin)

- Finland won the toss and elected to bat.
