= David Court (cricketer) =

English cricketer (born 1980)

Personal information
- Full name: David Graeme Court
- Born: 1 November 1980 (age 46); Plymouth, Devon, England
- Batting: Right-handed
- Bowling: Right-arm medium-fast

Domestic team information
- Years: Team
- 2001–2009: Devon

Career statistics
Competition	List A
Matches	6
Runs scored	104
Batting average	20.20
100s/50s	–/–
Top score	47
Balls bowled	252
Wickets	6
Bowling average	28.66
5 wickets in innings	–
10 wickets in match	–
Best bowling	2/23
Catches/stumpings	3/–
- Source: Cricinfo, 1 February 2011

David Graeme Court (born 1 November 1980) is an English cricketer. Court is a right-handed batsman who bowls right-arm medium-fast. He was born in Plymouth, Devon.

2001 saw him make his debut for Devon in a List A match against Bedfordshire in the 2nd round of the 2002 Cheltenham & Gloucester Trophy which was played in 2001. Court made his Minor Counties Championship debut for Devon in 2002 against Shropshire. Between 2002 and 2009, he represented the county in 37 Championship matches, the last of which came against Berkshire. In the same season that he made his debut for Devon, he also made his debut in the MCCA Knockout Trophy, which came against Cornwall. From 2002 to 2009, he represented the county in 22 Trophy matches, the last of which came against Staffordshire. After his List A debut in 2001, Court represented Devon in 6 further matches in that format between 2002 and 2005, the last of which came against Essex in the 1st round of the 2005 Cheltenham & Gloucester Trophy. In his 6 List A matches, he scored 104 runs at a batting average of 20.80, with a high score of 47. With the ball he took 6 wickets at a bowling average of 28.66, with best figures of 2/23.

Court has played Second XI cricket for the Somerset Second XI between 1998 and 1999. He was the analyst for Surrey County Cricket Club 1st XI and is currently Head of Player ID and Pathway at ECB
