= Dennis Zachariasson =

Danish cricketer (born 1974)

Personal information
- Full name: Dennis Zachariasson
- Born: 25 June 1974 (age 52); Copenhagen, Copenhagen County, Denmark
- Batting: Right-handed
- Bowling: Right-arm medium

Domestic team information
- Years: Team
- 1999-2002: Denmark

Career statistics
Competition	List A
Matches	3
Runs scored	20
Batting average	–
100s/50s	–/–
Top score	16*
Balls bowled	66
Wickets	1
Bowling average	65.00
5 wickets in innings	–
10 wickets in match	–
Best bowling	1/22
Catches/stumpings	–/–
- Source: Cricinfo, 15 January 2011

Dennis Zachariasson (born 25 June 1974) is a Danish former cricketer. Zachariasson was a right-handed batsman who bowled right-arm medium. He was born in Copenhagen, Copenhagen County.

Zachariasson made his List A debut for Denmark in the 1999 NatWest Trophy against the Kent Cricket Board. He represented Denmark in 2 further List A matches, both of which came in the English domestic one-day competition, against the Durham Cricket Board in the 2000 NatWest Trophy and the Leicestershire Cricket Board in the 1st round of the 2003 Cheltenham & Gloucester Trophy which was held in 2002. In his 3 List A matches for Denmark, he scored 20 runs in two unbeaten innings, with a top score of 16*. With the ball, he took a single wicket at a bowling average of 65.00, with best figures of 1/22.
