= Saad Hafeez =

Danish cricketer (born 1977)

Personal information
- Full name: Saad Hafeez
- Born: 23 March 1977 (age 49); Glostrup, Copenhagen County, Denmark
- Batting: Right-handed
- Bowling: Right-arm medium
- Role: Wicket-keeper

International information
- National side: Denmark

Domestic team information
- Years: Team
- 2001–2002: Denmark

Career statistics
Competition	List A
Matches	2
Runs scored	16
Batting average	10.00
100s/50s	–/–
Top score	16
Balls bowled	23
Wickets	1
Bowling average	18.00
5 wickets in innings	–
10 wickets in match	–
Best bowling	1/14
Catches/stumpings	1/–
- Source: Cricinfo, 15 January 2011

Saad Hafeez (Urdu: سعد حفیظ; born 23 March 1977) is a former Danish cricketer. Hafeez was a right-handed batsman and wicket-keeper, who bowled right-arm medium pace. He was born at Glostrup, Copenhagen County.

Hafeez made his debut for Denmark in the 2001 ICC Trophy in Canada against Ireland. He made three further appearances during the tournament, against Canada, Scotland and the United Arab Emirates. Hafeez scored 21 runs with a high score of 10 in his four matches, Later in 2001, he made his List A debut for Denmark against Suffolk in the 1st round of English domestic cricket's 2002 Cheltenham & Gloucester Trophy, which was played in August 2001 to avoid fixture congestion early in the 2002 season. In the match, held at Old London Road in Copdock, Suffolk, Denmark won the toss and elected to bat first, making 112 all out from 28.4 overs against their minor county opponents, with Hafeez scoring 9 runs before he was dismissed by Ian Graham. Suffolk won the match by 7 wickets, though in their chase Hafeez did take the wicket of Dave Callaghan for 49, stumped off his bowling by Frederik Klokker. He made a second List A appearance the following year against the Leicestershire Cricket Board (LCB) in the 1st round of the 2003 Cheltenham & Gloucester Trophy which was played in August 2002, in the same arrangement as the previous competition. In the match, held at Ratcliffe College in Cossington, Leicestershire, the LCB won the toss and elected to put Denmark into bat, with Denmark making 249/6 from their 50 overs, with Hafeez ending the innings not out on 6. The LCB won the match by 4 wickets. This was his final appearance for Denmark.
