= Martin Jensen (cricketer) =

Danish cricketer

Personal information
- Full name: Martin Tanga Jensen
- Born: 19 January 1976 (age 50); Glostrup, Copenhagen County, Denmark
- Batting: Right-handed
- Bowling: Right-arm medium

International information
- National side: Denmark

Career statistics
Competition	List A
Matches	2
Runs scored	18
Batting average	–
100s/50s	0/0
Top score	18*
Balls bowled	55
Wickets	4
Bowling average	11.75
5 wickets in innings	0
10 wickets in match	–
Best bowling	3/27
Catches/stumpings	0/–
- Source: Cricinfo, 15 January 2011

Martin Tanga Jensen (born 19 January 1976) is a Danish former cricketer. Jensen was a right-handed batsman who bowled right-arm medium pace. He was born at Glostrup, Copenhagen County.

Jensen represented Denmark under-19s in the 1995 International Youth Tournament, making three appearances, against Ireland, Scotland and the Netherlands. His senior debut for Denmark came in the 2000 ICC Emerging Nations Tournament, with him making his List A debut in the tournament against Ireland. Ireland won the toss and elected to bat first, making 217/8 in their 50 overs, with Jensen taking figures of 3/27 from 8 overs. Denmark successfully chased the target, winning by 5 wickets, with Jensen not required to bat. He made a further List A appearance in the tournament against Kenya. Kenya won the toss and put Denmark into bat, dismissing them for just 85, with Jensen ending the innings not out on 18, which was the highest score of the innings. Kenya successfully chased their target to win by 8 wickets, with Jensen taking one of the wickets to fall, that of Ravindu Shah. These were his final appearances for Denmark.
