= Heath Road =

Cricket ground in England

Coordinates: 52°57′41.09″N 2°40′46.21″W

Ground information
- Location: Whitchurch, Shropshire
- Establishment: 1982 (first recorded match)

Team information
Shropshire	(1999-present)
- As of 15 August 2010; Source: Ground profile

Heath Road is a cricket ground in Whitchurch, Shropshire. The first recorded match on the ground was in 1982, when Whitchurch played Singapore in a warm-up match for the 1982 ICC Trophy. Shropshire played their first match at the ground in the 1999 MCCA Knockout Trophy against Cumberland. The following season they played their first Minor Counties Championship match at the ground against Herefordshire. From 2000 to present, the ground has hosted 10 Minor Counties Championship matches.

The ground has also held a single List-A match in the 2005 Cheltenham & Gloucester Trophy, which saw Shropshire play Hampshire. Hampshire captained by Shane Warne, won thanks to 76 runs from Kevin Pietersen as Hampshire chased down their target of 133 in 21.1 overs for the loss of 3 wickets.

In local domestic cricket, London Road is the home ground of Whitchurch Cricket Club who play in the Birmingham and District Premier League Two.
