= Finnish Cricket Championships =

The Finnish Cricket Championships have their roots in the 1960s, when the "Palmerston community" played their first matches in Tapiola, Espoo. The Cricket Club of Helsinki (Helsinki CC) was the first official team in Finland, and it began playing in the 1970s. Annual matches with the British Embassy in Stockholm were held against the team. It is also known that matches were held against some of the British who lived in Moscow.

The Finnish Cricket Association (Suomen Krikettiliitto ry) was created in 1999 to develop and organize the game of cricket in Finland. The turnover of the size of the top division was 45 (initially 40) overs until 2007, when it became 50 overs. In 2008, the Association created a second league, which is played with 40 overs. The winners of these series are promoted to the SM50 series, which is played by the best players in both leagues. In addition, Dev T20 and Open T20 series are played, which consist of 20 overs games and indoor cricket.

== Finnish Champions ==
=== SM45 (40) ===
- 1999 Helsinki CC
- 2000 Vantaa CC
- 2001 cf. Link - the image is found, which team?
- 2002 CC Helsinki - Vantaa CC - sources of conflict.
- 2003 Stadin Krikettikerho
- 2004 Stadin Krikettikerho
- 2005 Helsinki CC
- 2006 Tampere CC
- 2007 Stadin Krikettikerho

=== SM50 ===
- 2008, Helsinki, CC
- 2009, Helsinki, CC

=== SM40 ===
- 2008 Bengal Tigers
- 2009 Vaasa CC

=== Open T20 ===
- 2008 Finnish Pakistani Club
- 2009 Helsinki CC

=== Dev T20 ===
- 2008 Empire CC
- 2009 Bengal Tigers

=== Indoor ===
- 2009 Stadin Krikettikerho
- 2010 Helsinki CC
- 2011 Helsinki CC

== Sources ==
- https://web.archive.org/web/20100304192323/http://cricketfinland.com/cgi-bin/blosxom.cgi
- http://www.cricketfinland.com/cgi-bin/blosxom.cgi/English/Menu/Teams/Helsinki
- https://web.archive.org/web/20080517160824/http://www.vantaacc.com/home.html
- http://www.cricinfo.com/ci/content/image/158060.html?object=80; page = 2
- http://www.cricinfo.com/ci/content/story/features.html?object=80
