= Andreas Lambert (cricketer) =

Danish cricketer (born 1981)

Personal information
- Full name: Andreas Lambert
- Born: 28 February 1981 (age 45); Århus, Denmark
- Batting: Left-handed
- Bowling: medium pace

International information
- National side: Denmark

Domestic team information
- Years: Team
- 2003: Denmark

Career statistics
Competition	List A
Matches	3
Runs scored	74
Batting average	37.00
100s/50s	–/–
Top score	38*
Balls bowled	18
Wickets	–
Bowling average	–
5 wickets in innings	–
10 wickets in match	–
Best bowling	–
Catches/stumpings	–/–
- Source: CricketArchive, 15 January 2011

Andreas 'Andy' Lambert (born 28 February 1981) is a Danish cricketer. Lambert is a left-handed batsman who bowls left-arm medium pace. He was born in Århus, Denmark.

Lambert represented Denmark Under-19's in 6 youth One Day Internationals in 1998, before playing making his List A debut for Denmark in the 2000 ICC Emerging Nations Tournament against Ireland. He played one further match in the competition against Kenya, before playing his final List A match in the 1st round of the 2004 Cheltenham & Gloucester Trophy against Wales Minor Counties, which was played in 2003. In his 5 List A matches for Denmark, he scored 74 runs at a batting average of 37.00, with a high score of 38*.

In 2001, Lambert played a single Second XI Championship match for the Kent Second XI against the Gloucestershire Second XI. In August 2012, he was selected in Denmark's fourteen man squad for the World Cricket League Division Four in Malaysia.
