= Abhiraj Singh =

Singaporean cricketer (born 1995)

Personal information
- Full name: Abhiraj Rajdeep Singh
- Born: 27 May 1995 (age 31); Mumbai, India
- Batting: Left-handed

International information
- National side: Singapore
Medal record
Representing Singapore
Men's Cricket
Southeast Asian Games
Gold medal – first place	2017 Kuala Lumpur	Twenty20
Silver medal – second place	2017 Kuala Lumpur	50 over
- Source: ESPNcricinfo, 2 April 2017

Abhiraj Singh (born 27 May 1995) is a Singaporean cricketer. He played in the 2014 ICC World Cricket League Division Three tournament. He made his first-class debut on 28 March 2017 for Durham MCCU against Gloucestershire as part of the Marylebone Cricket Club University fixtures.

He was part of Singapore's squad for the 2018 Asia Cup Qualifier tournament as well as for the 2018 ICC World Cricket League Division Three tournament in Oman.
