= Christopher Janik =

Singaporean cricketer (born 1986)

Personal information
- Born: 27 March 1986 (age 40)
- Batting: Right-handed

International information
- National side: Singapore
- Source: Cricinfo, 24 October 2014

Christopher Janik (born 27 March 1986) is a Singaporean cricketer. A right-handed batsman, he played in the Singapore team in the 2014 ICC World Cricket League Division Three tournament.

== Education ==
Janik studied at Anglo-Chinese School (Junior).

== Personal life ==
Janik was born to German father, Detlev. and mother, Daisy.
