= Finland national cricket team =

Finland
- Flag of Finland
- Nickname: Bears
- Association: Cricket Finland

Personnel
- Captain: Amjad Sher
- Coach: Matthew Jenkinson

International Cricket Council
- ICC status: Associate member (2017); Affiliate member (2000)
- ICC region: Europe
ICC Rankings	Current	Best-ever
T20I	44th	44th (13 Jun 2026)

International cricket
- First international: v Austria at Seebarn Cricket Centre; 21 August 2000

T20 Internationals
- First T20I: v Denmark at Svanholm Park, Brøndby; 13 July 2019
- Last T20I: v Germany at Kerava National Cricket Ground, Kerava; 21 August 2026
T20Is	Played	Won/Lost
Total	56	26/28 (1 tie, 1 no result)
This year	16	8/7 (0 ties, 1 no result)
T20I kit
- As of 21 August 2026

The Finnish national cricket team is the team that represents Finland in international cricket. It is organised by the Cricket Finland.

== History ==
Cricket was first played in Finland in the 1960s, but did not become formally organised until the 1970s, under the auspices of the Helsinki Cricket Club. More clubs were founded in the 1990s, and the Finnish Cricket Association was founded in 1999. They became an affiliate member of the International Cricket Council (ICC) the following year. The CricketFinland logo/flag was designed by Jesse Karjalainen. In 2017, they became an associate member of the ICC.

Cricket is growing in the country, and there are currently 10 teams contesting the national league, over 300 male players, 30 female players, 20 ECB qualified coaches, and over 30 qualified umpires.

The Finnish national team has participated at various levels in European regional tournaments, their first coming in 2000, when they finished last in the ECC Representative Championship. They won the same tournament 2 years later, and were runners-up in 2004. They also competed in the ECC Affiliates Championship from 2001 to 2005, their best performance coming in their first year, when they finished in seventh place. They came last in 2005, placing them in Division Four of the newly expanded European Championship. They won that tournament in August 2006, giving them a spot in Division Three in 2007. In that tournament they were relegated to Division Four where they currently play.

=== 2018–Present ===
In April 2018, the ICC decided to grant full Twenty20 International (T20I) status to all its members. Therefore, all Twenty20 matches played between Finland and other ICC members after 1 January 2019 have the full T20I status.

Finland's first T20I matches were played against Denmark on 13 July 2019, followed by a series against Spain the following month.

13 July 2019
11:00
Scorecard

Denmark; 117 (18.3 overs)	v	Finland; 116/7 (20 overs)
Hamid Shah 36 (18); Md Nurul Huda 3/11 (2.3 overs)		Nathan Collins 53 (62); Delawar Khan 2/21 (4 overs)

Denmark won by 1 run
Svanholm Park, Brøndby
Umpires: Jesper Jensen (Den) and Sriharsha Kuchimanchi (Fin)
Player of the match: Md Nurul Huda (Fin)

- Finland won the toss and elected to field.
- First ever T20I match for Finland.

In April 2025, Cricket Finland announced a strategic partnership with Playbox Oy, a premier indoor sports facility located in Vantaa. As part of this collaboration, Playbox Oy became the official indoor training venue and sponsor for the Finnish national cricket team, known as the Bears. The facility is a first of its kind in the EU and offers indoor cricket amenities that has been lacking in Finland, facilities includes professional-grade surfaces providing the national team and development squads with year-round training opportunities this is especially useful for Finland's challenging weather conditions. The partnership is expected to significantly enhance player performance and support the growth of cricket in Finland by strengthening infrastructure and promoting inclusivity within the sport.

== International grounds ==
Locations of all stadiums which have hosted international cricket matches within Finland

== Tournament history ==
=== European Cricket Championship ===
- 2006: 1st place (Division Four)
- 2007: 8th place (Division Three)
- 2009: 5th place (Division Four)

== Finnish Cricket Association ==
The Finnish Cricket Association (Suomen Krikettiliitto ry) was set up in 1999 to develop and organise the game of cricket in Finland. The Finnish Cricket Association is currently responsible for the following areas:

- Finnish national league (Suomen mestaruussarja), an 11 team league with clubs from the national capital Helsinki, and the cities of Turku and Tampere.
- Youth development: An introductory level schools programme in the capital area, aided by developing club youth programmes.
- National team: The national team won the 2006 European Championship Division 4, enabling them to move up to Division 3 in 2007, from which they were relegated back to Division 4.
- Regional Development: Tampere and Turku are already thriving regional centres of cricket development. Oulu, Jyväskylä and Lahti form the basis of the expansion of this programme.
- Umpiring: Each Finnish league game is officiated by ACUS/ ECC qualified umpires.
- The Finnish Cricket Championships

== Domestic structure ==
Cricket in Finland has been expanding, here is the current list of teams playing in SM50 (the first division), SM40 (the second division), Developmental T20 League, Open T20 League and Indoor League.

- Arctic Wolves Cricket Club
- Bengal Tigers Cricket Club
- Ekenäs Cricket Club
- Empire Cricket Club (also social team: Empiricists)
- Espoo Cricket Club
- Finnish Pakistani Club
- FinnAsia Cricket Club
- Helsinki Cricket Club
- Kuopio Cricket Club
- Merisotakoulun Krikettiklubi – Naval Academy Cricket Club
- Men's Thinking Society
- Stadin Krikettikerho (also social team: Socialists)
- Tampere Cricket Club
- Tampere Eagles Cricket Club
- Turku Cricket Club
- Vaasa Cricket Club
- Vantaa Cricket Club
- Jyväskylä Cricket Club
- Finnish National Team
- Finnish Youth National Team
- Phoenix – The Ladies Team
- Everest 8848 CC
- Oulu Cricket Club
- Saimaa Cricket Club

== Records ==
International Match Summary — Finland

Last updated 21 August 2026

Playing Record
Format	M	W	L	T	NR	Inaugural Match
Twenty20 Internationals	56	26	28	1	1	13 July 2019

=== Twenty20 International ===
- Highest team total: 199/8 v. Bulgaria on 27 August 2024 at Guernsey Rovers Athletic Club Ground, Port Soif
- Highest individual score: 79, Nathan Collins v. Estonia on 19 June 2022 at Kerava National Cricket Ground, Kerava
- Best individual bowling figures: 6/7, Hammadullah Shinwari v. Cyprus on 9 May 2026 at Happy Valley Ground, Episkopi

T20I record versus other nations

Records complete to T20I #4093. Last updated 21 August 2026.

Opponent	M	W	L	T	NR	First match	First win
vs Associate Members
Austria	1	1	0	0	0	11 June 2026	11 June 2026
Bulgaria	2	2	0	0	0	27 August 2024	27 August 2024
Croatia	1	1	0	0	0	18 July 2022	18 July 2022
Cyprus	5	4	1	0	0	19 July 2022	19 July 2022
Denmark	8	1	7	0	0	13 July 2019	7 May 2022
Estonia	6	4	2	0	0	19 June 2022	
Germany	2	0	2	0	0	11 August 2026	
Greece	1	1	0	0	0	16 July 2022	16 July 2022
Guernsey	1	1	0	0	0	24 August 2024	24 August 2024
Italy	1	0	1	0	0	13 July 2022	
Luxembourg	1	1	0	0	0	18 August 2026	18 August 2026
Malta	1	1	0	0	0	21 August 2024	21 August 2024
Norway	8	3	5	0	0	19 May 2023	14 June 2025
Portugal	3	0	2	0	1	3 July 2026	
Spain	5	1	4	0	0	17 August 2019	17 August 2019
Sweden	10	5	4	1	0	21 August 2021	21 August 2021

== See also ==
- List of Finland Twenty20 International cricketers
- Finland women's national cricket team
- Cricket in Finland
