= Jan Overgaard =

Danish cricketer (born 1973)

Personal information
- Full name: Jan Overgaard
- Born: 24 April 1973 (age 53); Køge, Denmark
- Batting: Right-handed

International information
- National side: Denmark

Domestic team information
- Years: Team
- 2000-2001: Denmark

Career statistics
Competition	List A
Matches	5
Runs scored	80
Batting average	20.00
100s/50s	–/1
Top score	67*
Balls bowled	–
Wickets	–
Bowling average	–
5 wickets in innings	–
10 wickets in match	–
Best bowling	–
Catches/stumpings	1/–
- Source: Cricinfo, 15 January 2011

Jan Overgaard (born 24 April 1973) is a Danish former cricketer. Overgaard was a right-handed batsman. He was born at Køge.

Overgaard made his List A debut for Denmark in international cricket in the 2000 ICC Emerging Nations Tournament against Zimbabwe A. He played two further List A matches during the tournament against the Netherlands and Scotland. In the same year, he represented Denmark in the English domestic one-day competition, the NatWest Trophy against the Durham Cricket Board. He represented Denmark in a further List A match which came against Suffolk in the 1st round of the 2002 Cheltenham & Gloucester Trophy, which was held in 2001. In his 5 List A matches for Denmark, he scored 80 runs at a batting average of 20.00, with a single half century high score of 67*.
