= Bashir Shah =

Danish cricketer

Personal information
- Born: 6 April 1983 (age 43); Quetta, Baluchistan, Pakistan
- Batting: Right-handed
- Bowling: Left-arm off break

International information
- National side: Denmark (2019-present)
- T20I debut (cap 4): 16 June 2019 v Jersey
- Last T20I: 21 October 2021 v Jersey
- T20I shirt no.: 52

Career statistics
Competition	List A	Twenty20
Matches	12	7
Runs scored	21	20
Batting average	7.00	10.00
100s/50s	0/0	0/0
Top score	10*	10*
Balls bowled	527	132
Wickets	12	3
Bowling average	39.25	56.33
5 wickets in innings	0	0
10 wickets in match	0	0
Best bowling	2/40	2/36
Catches/stumpings	3/–	0/–
- Source: Cricinfo, 21 October 2021

Syed Bashir Ahmed Shah (born 6 April 1983) is a Pakistani-born Danish cricketer. Shah is a right-handed batsman who bowls orthodox slow left-arm. He was born at Quetta, Baluchistan.

== Career ==
Shah made his debut for Denmark against Ireland A in July 2007. Later in 2007, Shah was selected as part of Denmark's squad for the World Cricket League Division Two in Namibia. It was during this tournament that Shah made his debut in List A cricket against Namibia. He made five further List A appearances during the tournament, taking 6 wickets at an average of 35.00. Two years later, he was selected in the Danish squad for the World Cup Qualifier in South Africa, where he made six List A appearances, including his final appearance to date in that format, against Oman. He took 6 wickets during the tournament, at an average of 43.50.

In 2011, Shah was selected as part of Denmark's squad for the 2011 ICC World Cricket League Division Three tournament in Hong Kong, making three appearances. In March 2012, Denmark took part in the World Twenty20 Qualifier in the United Arab Emirates, with Shah selected in their fourteen-man squad. Shah made his Twenty20 debut during the tournament against Bermuda at the Sheikh Zayed Cricket Stadium. He made six further appearances during the competition, the last of which came against Oman, scoring 20 runs and taking 2 wickets in the tournament.

In August 2012, Shah was selected in Denmark's fourteen- man squad for the World Cricket League Division Four in Malaysia. In March 2018, he was named in Denmark's squad for the 2018 ICC World Cricket League Division Four tournament, also in Malaysia. He was named as the player to watch in the squad ahead of the tournament. In November 2018, he was named in Denmark's squad for the 2018 ICC World Cricket League Division Three tournament in Oman.

In May 2019, he was named in Denmark's squad for the Regional Finals of the 2018–19 ICC T20 World Cup Europe Qualifier tournament in Guernsey. He made his Twenty20 International (T20I) debut, against Jersey, on 16 June 2019. In October 2021, he was named in Denmark's T20I squad for the Regional Final of the 2021 ICC Men's T20 World Cup Europe Qualifier tournament.
