= Rasmus Kofoed (cricketer) =

Danish cricketer

Personal information
- Full name: Rasmus Frejlev Kofoed
- Born: Aalborg, Aalborg Municipality, Denmark
- Batting: Unknown

Domestic team information
- Years: Team
- 2002: Denmark

Career statistics
| Competition | List A |
|---|---|
| Matches | 1 |
| Runs scored | 14 |
| Batting average | 14.00 |
| 100s/50s | 0/0 |
| Top score | 14 |
| Catches/stumpings | 0/– |
- Source: CricketArchive, 15 January 2011

Rasmus Frejlev Kofoed is a Danish former cricketer. Kofoed's batting style is unknown. He was born at Aalborg, Aalborg Municipality.

Kofoed made his debut for Denmark in a List A match against the Leicestershire Cricket Board (LCB) in the 1st round of English domestic cricket's 2003 Cheltenham & Gloucester Trophy, which was held in August 2002 to avoid fixture congestion early in the 2003 season. In the match, held at Ratcliffe College in Cossington, Leicestershire, the LCB won the toss and elected to put Denmark into bat, with Denmark making 249/6 from their 50 overs, with Kofoed opening the innings and scoring 143 runs before he was dismissed by Neil Pullen. The LCB won the match by 4 wickets. Four years later, he made a second appearance for Denmark in a match against the Netherlands A. This was his final appearance for Denmark.
