= Svanholm Park =

Cricket ground

Coordinates: 55°37′43.90″N 12°25′42.40″E

- Interactive map of Svanholm Park

Ground information
- Location: Brøndby, Denmark
- Country: Denmark
- Establishment: 1999 (first recorded match)

International information
- First T20I: 13 July 2019: Denmark v Finland
- Last T20I: 16 June 2024: Denmark v Jersey
- As of 16 June 2024; Source: Cricinfo

Svanholm Park is a cricket ground in Brøndby, Denmark. The ground was constructed following the need for Svanholm Cricket Klub to move from their ground next to the Brøndby Stadium due to Brøndby IF needing to build a new stand which would have encroached on the ground. Svanholm Park was constructed by 1999 and contains three cricket grounds. The grounds overlap one another, so when the centre ground (which are the only grass pitch in Denmark) is in use, neither of the grounds flanking it can be used. The grounds facilities also include a purpose-built pavilion and indoor practice facilities.

Th ground first saw action when Denmark played Pakistan Emerging Players in 1999. Later, a single List A match was held there in the 2005 Cheltenham & Gloucester Trophy when Denmark played Northamptonshire. Denmark suffered a heavy defeat in this match. Batting first, they were dismissed for just 56, with Northamptonshire's Charl Pietersen taking figures of 7/10 from 8 overs. In reply, Northamptonshire knocked off the winning runs with just two wickets lost. This was the first major men's match to be played in Denmark.

The national teams of the Netherlands, Bermuda, Finland and Norway have also played international matches at the ground. The ground hosted official Twenty20 International matches for the first time in July 2019, when Finland toured for a two-match series, which Denmark won 2–0.
