= Kerava National Cricket Ground =

Cricket ground

Ground information
- Location: Kerava, Finland
- Coordinates: 60.39141°N 25.11646°E
- Establishment: June 2014

International information
- First T20I: 17 August 2019: Finland v Spain
- Last T20I: 16 June 2024: Finland v Norway
- First WT20I: 25 August 2023: Denmark v Norway
- Last WT20I: 26 August 2023: Denmark v Sweden
- As of 16 June 2024; Source: Cricinfo

The Kerava National Cricket Ground is a cricket ground in Kerava, Finland, home to the Kerava Cricket Club. The ground was opened in June 2014, in the presence of England Test cricketer Mike Brearley and Lord Mervyn King. In February 2019, it was announced that the venue would host three Twenty20 International (T20I) matches in August 2019, between Finland and Spain. Kerava National Cricket Ground is the northernmost cricket ground in the world which has hosted a T20 International match.
