= 2005 Cheltenham & Gloucester Trophy =

- Administrator: England and Wales Cricket Board
- Cricket format: Limited overs cricket (50 overs)
- Tournament format: Knockout
- Champions: Hampshire Hawks (2nd title)
- Participants: 32
- Matches: 31
- Most runs: Nick Knight 435 (Warwickshire Bears)
- Most wickets: Neil Carter 14 (Warwickshire Bears)

The 2005 Cheltenham & Gloucester Trophy was the 4th Cheltenham & Gloucester Trophy, an English county cricket tournament, held between 3 May and 3 September 2005. The competition was contested by all 18 first-class counties, as well as 10 minor counties and the national teams of Scotland, Ireland, the Netherlands and Denmark, to make up a full 32-team tournament. The final was won by the Hampshire Hawks, who beat the Warwickshire Bears by 18 runs at Lord's on 3 September 2005.

This would be the final year that the competition used a purely knockout format, and was also the final year to date in which the minor counties also participated. It would be the first year white balls and coloured clothing were used, although red balls and white clothing were still used in the early stages in matches between first class counties and the minor counties.

== Format ==
The eighteen first-class counties were joined by ten minor counties – Bedfordshire, Berkshire, Buckinghamshire, Devon, Northumberland, Shropshire, Staffordshire, Suffolk, Wales Minor Counties and Wiltshire – as well as the national teams of Denmark, Ireland, the Netherlands and Scotland. Teams who won in the first round progressed to the second round, those who won in the second round progressed to the quarter-finals. Winner from the quarter-finals progressed to the semi-finals and winners from that round progressed to the final at Lord's, which was held on 3 September 2005.

== Fixtures ==
=== First round ===
The first round was held on 3–5 May. While some upsets looked possible at times, with teams such as the Netherlands, Berkshire and Staffordshire threatening their first-class opponents, there were no first round surprises. Two of the games featured two first-class teams: Durham lost to Derbyshire by one wicket off the last ball; Somerset were edged out by Leicestershire in a very low-scoring thriller.

3 May 2005
Scorecard

Denmark; 56 (24.3 overs)	v	Northamptonshire Steelbacks; 59/2 (16.5 overs)
RJA Malcolm-Hansen 8 (20); C Pietersen 7/10 [8]		TW Roberts 20 (16); HB Øre 1/28 [7]

Northamptonshire won by 8 wickets
Svanholm Park, Brøndby
Umpires: MJ Kitchen and JW Lloyds
Player of the match: C Pietersen (N'hants)

Northamptonshire's Charl Pietersen took 7 for 10 at Svanholm Park, Brøndby as Denmark fell to the competition's second lowest score in its history, for 56 all out. 24 of those runs were extras, with no Dane scoring more than 8 with the bat. Pietersen, who was playing in his debut match for the Northants first team said, "The ball was swinging about and they were perfect conditions for bowling. I just concentrated on getting the ball in the right areas and the conditions did the rest. I'm grateful for the opportunity I've been given by Northants. I'm here to learn and try to get myself in the first team on a regular basis. No cricketer wants to play second-team cricket and I'm no different. But one performance won't get me in, I've got to be consistent with my wicket-taking and my economy."

It took Northamptonshire one ball less than 17 overs to make 59 for 2 to win the match just before lunch as the Danes were humbled. Afterwards the Danish coach said, "We knew it was going to be difficult. We are short of money but we are trying to develop every time we play against different opposition. We have a lot of young players and it was good for them to test themselves against the professionals." (BBC scorecard)

3–4 May 2005
Scorecard

Warwickshire Bears; 237/5 (50 overs)	v	Netherlands; 214 (49 overs)
NV Knight 108 (145); DJ Reekers 2/37 [10]		DLS van Bunge 89 (104); HH Streak 4/27 [10]

Warwickshire won by 23 runs
Hazelaarweg Stadion, Rotterdam
Umpires: JW Holder and JF Steele
Player of the match: NV Knight (Warks)

- Reserve day used

Nick Knight made 108 in Rotterdam to take Warwickshire to 237 for 5, despite five maidens being bowled by the Dutch. In reply Holland were 101 for 4 off 27 overs when rain prevented play for the first day, leaving them 137 to win off 23 overs on the second day. Daan van Bunge was doing well with 37 off 37 balls at close. Van Bunge was the mainstay of the reply on the second day, and the Dutch looked good as long as he and Billy Stelling were at the crease, and they led the way to 205 for 5 before Stelling was caught off Neil Carter. That precipitated a collapse, as the last 4 wickets went for 9 runs, and Warwickshire managed a 23-run victory. (BBC scorecard)

3–4 May 2005
Scorecard

Gloucestershire Gladiators; 223 (49.3 overs)	v	Berkshire; 138 (36.3 overs)
WPC Weston 80 (121); NA Denning 3/39 [9.3]		BHD Mordt 43 (79); UDU Chandana 4/27 [9]

Gloucestershire won by 85 runs
Reading Cricket Club, Reading
Umpires: RJ Bailey and IJ Gould
Player of the match: WPC Weston (Glos)

- Reserve day used

Berkshire did well at their home ground in Reading. Despite 80 from Phil Weston, Gloucestershire only made 223 from 49.3 overs. Apart from a second-wicket partnership worth 118 between Weston and Chris Taylor, wickets fell regularly, leaving the minor county in with a clear chance. Berkshire progressed well in reply, reaching 69 for 2 off 14 overs when rain halted play for the day. On the second day, however, Berkshire soon capitulated for 138, as Sri Lankan spinner Upul Chandana took 4 for 27. The last eight wickets fell for 26 runs. (BBC scorecard)

3–4 May 2005
Scorecard

Lancashire Lightning; 370/4 (50 overs)	v	Buckinghamshire; 39/2 (10.3 overs)
AR Crook 162* (155); ZA Sher 2/71 [10]		KT Medlycott 21* (37); JM Anderson 2/12 [5.3]

Lancashire won by 51 runs (D/L method)
Sir Paul Getty's Ground, Wormsley
Umpires: NL Bainton and MJ Harris
Player of the match: AR Crook (Lancs)

- No play on the reserve day

Andrew Crook scored freely for Lancashire at Sir Paul Getty's Ground at Wormsley as he broke Lancashire's one-day record with his 162 not out. Glen Chapple gave support as he scored the competition's fastest ever half-century, making 55 in just 16 balls as the first-class team finished on 370 for 4. They were denied the chance to wrap up the win on the first day though, as rain halted play with Buckinghamshire on 39 for 2. No play was possible on the second day, and with 10.3 overs of Buckinghamshire's innings bowled, a decision was possible on the Duckworth-Lewis method.(BBC scorecard)

3–4 May 2005
Scorecard

Essex Eagles; 264/5 (50 overs)	v	Devon; 84 (34.2 overs)
A Flower 69 (72); DG Court 1/28 [8]		ND Hancock 40 (69); AR Adams 3/17 [8]

Essex won by 180 runs
The Maer Ground, Exmouth
Umpires: GI Burgess and R Palmer
Player of the match: RS Bopara (Essex)

- Reserve day used

No play was possible on the first day at Exmouth because of rain. When play started on what was a wettish pitch with a slow outfield Essex hit over the top and ended on 264 for 5 off their 50 overs, with Andy Flower and Ravinder Bopara recording half-centuries. Devon were not competitive in reply and soon succumbed, making only 84, although that could be seen as a recovery from 23 for 6 - a position they were in thanks to Essex pacers Andre Adams and Darren Gough, who took three wickets each with the new ball. Neil Hancock, who turned out in two Twenty20 games and one National League match for Somerset in 2004, top scored with 40 despite batting at seven. (Cricinfo scorecard)

3–4 May 2005
Scorecard

Ireland; 201/7 (50 overs)	v	Yorkshire Phoenix; 202/4 (47.4 overs)
EJG Morgan 59 (95); C White 4/43 [10]		MP Vaughan 58 (92); WK McCallan 1/29 [9]

Yorkshire won by 6 wickets
Civil Service Cricket Club Ground, Belfast
Umpires: PJ Hartley and TE Jesty
Player of the match: EJG Morgan (Ire)

- Reserve day used

Ireland, trying to emulate their success in this competition against Surrey the previous year, fared poorly on the first day at Belfast. After being put into bat by Yorkshire, the visitors' fast bowler Matthew Hoggard took two wickets to help reduce them to 33 for 3 when rain put an end to proceedings for the day after 12.3 overs. After the play that was possible, Irish vice-captain Kyle McCallan said, "It was disappointing losing our top three batsmen so early on. But our strength is in our depth of batting. It's not the end of the world at the moment and we're still hoping to post a total of around 200."

On the second day they achieved this, reaching 201 thanks to half-centuries from Eoin Morgan and Peter Gillespie, but it was never going to be enough against Yorkshire. Half-centuries from Ian Harvey, Michael Vaughan and Phil Jaques saw the visitors home with 15 balls to spare as they made 202 for 4.(BBC scorecard)

3–4 May 2005
Scorecard

Northumberland; 206/8 (50 overs)	v	Middlesex Crusaders; 210/0 (31.3 overs)
S Humble 88* (76); JWM Dalrymple 3/24 [10]		PN Weekes 106* (115)

Middlesex won by 10 wickets
Osborne Avenue, Jesmond
Umpires: SA Garratt and B Leadbeater
Player of the match: S Humble (Northumberland)

- Reserve day used

Rain meant there was no play on the first day at Jesmond. On a second day where plenty of runs were available, Northumberland put on 206 for 8 with Stephen Humble making an unbeaten 88 from number 8 in the batting order. Middlesex in the shape of Ed Smith and Paul Weekes knocked them off in just 31.3 overs. Weekes ended up with 106, Middlesex' first List A century of the season. (BBC scorecard)

3 May 2005
Scorecard

Kent Spitfires; 160 (46.5 overs)	v	Wiltshire; 151 (49.1 overs)
MA Carberry 41 (69); KJ Nash 4/46 [8.5]		MS Coles 32 (69); SJ Cook 4/22 [9.1]

Kent won by 9 runs
Salisbury and South Wiltshire Sports Club, Salisbury
Umpires: VA Holder and CG Pocock
Player of the match: KJ Nash (Wilts)

Kent came close to being humiliated by the minor county Wiltshire at Salisbury as they were bowled out for 160, with Kevin Nash taking 4 for 46. In reply, Wiltshire were always in with a chance, but lost wickets regularly, with Simon Cook taking 4 for 22. However, with 10 runs needed off the last over, Nash was run out to seal a Kent win. (BBC scorecard)

4 May 2005
Scorecard

Bedfordshire; 143/9 (50 overs)	v	Sussex Sharks; 146/2 (18.3 overs)
AJ Trott 34 (37); RJ Kirtley 3/24 [10]		IJ Ward 65 (44); MW Patterson 2/53 [6.3]

Sussex won by 8 wickets
Wardown Park, Luton
Umpires: K Coburn and NA Mallender
Player of the match: IJ Ward (Sssx)

Bedfordshire batted first at Luton. They progressed slowly, making their first 50 in the 23rd over. Whilst they improved to 143 for 9 in their 50 overs, it was never going to be enough. By way of comparison, it took Sussex six overs to reach their first 50, with Ian Ward (65 off 44) scoring most of the early runs, although admittedly batting was easier on the drying pitch. Sussex overhauled their modest target with 31.3 overs to go - almost two thirds of their allotted quota. (Cricinfo scorecard)

4–5 May 2005
Scorecard

Durham Dynamos; 234 (50 overs)	v	Derbyshire Phantoms; 237/9 (50 overs)
PD Collingwood 82 (83); AG Botha 4/44 [10]		CWG Bassano 57 (104); SJ Harmison 3/45 [10]

Derbyshire won by 1 wicket
Riverside Ground, Chester-le-Street
Umpires: B Dudleston and AGT Whitehead
Player of the match: AG Botha (Derbs)

- Reserve day used

Durham put on 234 in their 50 overs at Chester-le-Street, mostly thanks Paul Collingwood, who scored 82 from 83 balls. Spin bowler Ant Botha took 4 for 44. In reply, Steve Harmison performed well, trapping Michael Di Venuto lbw with his third ball and, in a hostile and accurate spell, had Hassan Adnan caught at first slip. He ended with three for 45. Derbyshire were wobbling, but anchored by Chris Bassano who eked out 57 from 104 balls. This, along with 50 from Graeme Welch, kept Derbyshire in the game, but it needed a tenth wicket partnership of 16 between Botha and Kevin Dean to see them through on the last ball of the game. (Cricinfo scorecard)

4 May 2005
Scorecard

Somerset Sabres; 94 (29.1 overs)	v	Leicestershire Foxes; 96/7 (29 overs)
ID Blackwell 40 (42); CM Willoughby 6/16 [10]		OD Gibson 21* (32); SRG Francis 3/31 [10]

Leicestershire won by 3 wickets
Grace Road, Leicester
Umpires: DJ Constant and NJ Llong
Player of the match: CM Willoughby (Leics)

It was an unusual game at Grace Road, which was all done by 3.30pm. The ball swung greatly, and there was seam movement, and Charl Willoughby of Leicestershire made the most of them first, taking 6 for 16 as Somerset were dismissed for 94 - though it could have been much worse, as they were 58 for 9 before Ian Blackwell and Simon Francis attacked and added 36 for the last wicket. Marcus Trescothick, the Somerset captain, who only made 11 said, "Conditions were not conducive to one-day cricket, that's for sure. Unfortunately, we lost the toss and had the worst of it, but we still thought we could win because we have more consistent length bowlers. Even 130 or so could have been a great score."

Leicestershire themselves struggled in reply, and Somerset took wickets regularly, reducing the hosts to 70 for 7. However, they were not able to take another, as Leicestershire ended on 96 for 7 - Ottis Gibson and Claude Henderson adding 26 for the eighth wicket, Leicestershire's highest partnership of the match. (Cricinfo scorecard)

4–5 May 2005
Scorecard

Scotland; 134 (46.5 overs)	v	Worcestershire Royals; 138/0 (19.1 overs)
RR Watson 53 (87); WPUJC Vaas 2/16 [8.5]		VS Solanki 74* (52)

Worcestershire won by 10 wickets
The Grange, Edinburgh
Umpires: AA Jones and G Sharp
Player of the match: VS Solanki (Worcs)

- Reserve day used

The first day at The Grange saw no play because of rain. After losing the toss, Scotland were put in, and the bowlers immediately made it very difficult for Scotland. It took them six overs to make their first ten runs, and every time they tried to accelerate, they lost wickets. In the end, they could only muster 134 all out in 46.5 overs. Vikram Solanki and Stephen Moore made this target look easy, passing the required 135 runs without losing a wicket in 5 balls fewer than 20 overs. Both batsmen made half-centuries. (Cricinfo scorecard)

4 May 2005
Scorecard

Shropshire; 132 (42.5 overs)	v	Hampshire Hawks; 133/3 (21.1 overs)
JD Whitney 39 (49); SK Warne 3/20 [8]		KP Pietersen 76 (49); GM Fellows 1/16 [3]

Hampshire won by 7 wickets
Heath Road, Whitchurch
Umpires: JH Evans and RA Kettleborough
Player of the match: KP Pietersen (Hants)

Shropshire batted first at Whitchurch, making only 132 as Shane Warne and Richard Logan took 3 wickets each. This was never a big enough target to hold off Hampshire. The crowd were treated to a powerful innings by England's new star one-day performer, Kevin Pietersen, who had been promoted to No. 1 in the batting order. He scored 76 off 49 balls in an innings that included six sixes and seven fours as Hampshire racked up 133 for 3 off 21.1 overs. (Cricinfo scorecard)

4 May 2005
Scorecard

Staffordshire; 186 (49.5 overs)	v	Surrey Brown Caps; 192/7 (48.5 overs)
RP Harvey 42 (69); J Ormond 3/29 [9.5]		MR Ramprakash 49 (97); D Follett 3/20 [9]

Surrey won by 3 wickets
Highfield, Leek
Umpires: JH Hampshire and RT Robinson
Player of the match: D Follett (Staffs)

Last year, Surrey were knocked out in Round One of this Trophy by Ireland, and so they would have come to Leek determined to avoid the same ignominy this time round. Staffordshire did push them hard, however. Staffordshire batted first, and made 186, with 23 wides showing how inaccurate the Surrey bowling was. In reply, ex-Middlesex bowler, David Follett, took 3 for 13 to reduce Surrey to a worrying 47 for 4. Then Mark Ramprakash came in, who steaded the Surrey ship with 49, before he was run out, leaving Surrey 45 to win off 62 balls with 4 wickets left. Rikki Clarke and Martin Bicknell got most of them, as Surrey won with 192 for 7 with 7 balls to go, Bicknell winning the game with a six. (Cricinfo scorecard)

4 May 2005
Scorecard

Glamorgan Dragons; 320/5 (50 overs)	v	Suffolk; 177/8 (50 overs)
MTG Elliott 100* (104); TM Smith 2/37 [10]		CJ Warn 45 (67); DS Harrison 2/16 [6]

Glamorgan won by 143 runs
Victory Ground, Bury St Edmunds
Umpires: MR Benson and D Johnson
Player of the match: MTG Elliott

After rain, play only began at 3pm at Bury St Edmunds with Glamorgan batting first. The highlight of their innings was an undefeated 100 from Matthew Elliott in 104 balls, with his partners contributing usefully as the visitors racked up an imposing 320 for 5. Suffolk were never in contention, and to spare the need for the match going into a second day, play continued in near-darkness to 8.40pm, with Glamorgan bowling their last 32 overs (all with spin, in order to make conditions playable for batsmen) in 80 minutes. Staffordshire finally finished on 177 for 8 off their 50 overs, recovering from 69 for 6. (Cricinfo scorecard)

4 May 2005
Scorecard

Wales Minor Counties; 119 (34.2 overs)	v	Nottinghamshire Outlaws; 121/4 (26.2 overs)
WD Bragg 41* (82); MA Ealham 4/28 [10]		RJ Warren 48* (79); AJ Davies 2/24 [6]

Nottinghamshire won by 6 wickets
St. Helen's Rugby and Cricket Ground, Swansea
Umpires: NGC Cowley and RK Illingworth
Player of the match: MA Ealham (Notts)

After a four-and-a-half hour rain delay, Wales Minor Counties batted first at Swansea, and fared poorly. The only score of any note came from Will Bragg, an 18-year-old left-hander, currently in the middle of his A-Level exams. He made an undefeated 41 runs, as Wales Minor Counties were dismissed for 119. Mark Ealham took 4 for 28 and Andrew Harris 3 for 31. Nottinghamshire were never really threatened, but did lose 4 wickets in making 121 off 26.2 overs. (Cricinfo scorecard)

=== Second round ===
The Second Round was played on 17 and 18 May. The surprise of the round was the elimination of defending champions Gloucestershire by a Surrey team that had lost all four of its one-day games against first-class counties up to that point in the season.

17 May 2005
Scorecard

Kent Spitfires; 257/4 (50 overs)	v	Derbyshire Phantoms; 130 (42.5 overs)
GO Jones 70 (75); AG Botha 3/40 [10]		LD Sutton 41 (79); MJ Saggers 3/21 [8]

Kent won by 127 runs
County Ground, Derby
Umpires: JW Holder and NA Mallender
Player of the match: GO Jones (Kent)

At Derby, Derbyshire won the toss and chose to field against Kent, who scored 257 for 4 after healthy contributions from the entire top order, Geraint Jones top-scoring with 70 while Derbyshire's South African all-rounder Ant Botha took three for 40 with his left-arm spin. Martin Saggers (three for 21), Amjad Khan (one for 12) and Simon Cook (one for 22) then reduced Derbyshire to 27 for 5, and Derbyshire were never in the match from there. Eventually they were bowled out for 130 in 42.5 overs. (Cricinfo scorecard)

17 May 2005
Scorecard

Glamorgan Dragons; 214 (48.4 overs)	v	Hampshire Hawks; 219/4 (39.1 overs)
MJ Powell 56 (73); SM Ervine 5/50 [10]		N Pothas 114* (127); AP Davies 2/30 (7 overs)

Hampshire won by 6 wickets
Sophia Gardens, Cardiff
Umpires: B Dudleston and VA Holder
Player of the match: N Pothas (Hants)

Zimbabwean all-rounder Sean Ervine and veteran wicket-keeper Nic Pothas made the most important contributions as Hampshire overpowered Glamorgan at Cardiff. Only Michael Powell showed some sort of resistance, scoring 56 in Glamorgan's 214, while Ervine took five for 50 from his ten overs - admittedly mostly tail-enders, but he got the most wickets. Chris Tremlett also took three for 32. Pothas then notched up the first limited-over century of the Hampshire season, scoring 114 not out off 127 balls and standing tall while Glamorgan's fast bowlers Andrew Davies and Simon Jones made inroads with the ball. England prospect Kevin Pietersen continued his fine form with 69 off 64 balls, including four sixes, as he shared a 130-run partnership with Pothas. Thanks to the quick scoring of Pothas and Pietersen, Hampshire won with nearly 11 overs to spare. (Cricinfo scorecard)

17 May 2005
Scorecard

Gloucestershire Gladiators; 230/8 (50 overs)	v	Surrey Brown Caps; 232/7 (49.3 overs)
APR Gidman 58* (66); TJ Murtagh 3/36 [10]		MR Ramprakash 84 (105); J Lewis 3/47 [10]

Surrey won by 3 wickets
County Ground, Bristol
Umpires: PJ Hartley and AGT Whitehead
Player of the match: R Clarke (Surrey)

Surrey overcame their poor one-day form, with four losses in four National League games, to reach the quarter-finals in a close game at Bristol against Gloucestershire. Surrey won the toss and fielded first, restricting Gloucestershire to 230 for 8 after most of the Surrey bowlers got wickets. Chris Taylor made 74 and top-scored, but it was the all-rounder Alex Gidman who managed to keep his head calm, scoring 58 not out while the tail crashed to single figure scores around him. In reply, Surrey struggled to 110 for 4, losing wickets at key moments, but Rikki Clarke (62 not out) stood tall towards the end, taking the winning runs off James Averis with three balls and three wickets remaining in the innings. (Cricinfo scorecard)

17 May 2005
Scorecard

Essex Eagles; 195/9 (50 overs)	v	Lancashire Lightning; 194/4 (44 overs)
RS Bopara 42 (83); A Flintoff 4/26 [10]		BJ Hodge 82 (102); AJ Tudor 2/34 [7]

Lancashire won by 6 wickets
Old Trafford, Manchester
Umpires: GI Burgess and P Willey
Player of the match: BJ Hodge (Lancs)

Andrew Flintoff took 4 for 26 in helpful bowling conditions as Essex made only 195 for 9 at Old Trafford. In reply, Lancashire's opening partnership of Mal Loye and Stuart Law put on 53 in 10.1 overs, before Alex Tudor dismissed them both. Brad Hodge, however, kept the run rate up. Hodge was dropped on 32, and Lancashire might have been put under pressure if it had been taken, but instead he went on to make 82 off 102 balls, as Lancashire made there target with 6 wickets and 6 overs to spare. (Cricinfo scorecard)

17 May 2005
Scorecard

Northamptonshire Steelbacks; 238 (50 overs)	v	Middlesex Crusaders; 219 (49.3 overs)
U Afzaal 75 (120); A Richardson 3/46 (10 overs)		PN Weekes 105 (148); DG Wright 4/38 [9.3]

Northamptonshire won by 19 runs
Lord's, London
Umpires: MJ Harris and MJ Kitchen
Player of the match: PN Weekes (Middx)

Northamptonshire batted first at Lord's. Their top order performed well, with Usman Afzaal making 75 off 120 balls, and useful contributions from Bilal Shafayat (46) and David Sales (40). However, once they were out, 7 wickets fell for 40 runs, leaving them on 215 for 9, before Rob White smacked 36 to lift the visitors to 238. Middlesex got off to a good start, reaching 148 for 2 and 168 for 3, as opener Paul Weekes scored a century. However, then Damien Wright took 4 wickets for 1 in 7 balls, as Middlesex collapsed in more spectacular fashion than the visitors, losing their last 6 wickets for 8 runs. (Cricinfo scorecard)

17 May 2005
Scorecard

Warwickshire Bears; 235/9 (50 overs)	v	Leicestershire Foxes; 152 (43.3 overs)
NV Knight 69 (86); CW Henderson 2/46 [10]		PA Nixon 38 (41); DR Brown 3/28 (8 overs)

Warwickshire won by 83 runs
Edgbaston, Birmingham
Umpires: NGC Cowley and G Sharp
Player of the match: HH Streak (Warks)

Dougie Brown took a wicket in each of his first three overs to help a poor Warwickshire one-day team to victory at Edgbaston. Warwickshire batted first, and the hosts were on 78 for two after 15 overs, with Nick Knight (69) and Ian Bell (35) in control. Then Bell was stumped attacking a ball from Claude Henderson leaving the score on 116 for 3 in the 22nd over. There then was a collapse as 5 fell for 64, before Heath Streak and Tony Frost put on 55 in the last 9 overs to lift Warwickshire to 235.

In Leicestershire's innings immediately faltered as Brown's wickets reduced them to 16 for 3. Brown was helped by good tight bowling from Heath Streak at the other end, which meant they chose to attack Brown. Leicestershire tried to rebuild, but never managed it, finally being dismissed for 152 with 6.3 overs to go. (Cricinfo scorecard)

17 May 2005
Scorecard

Yorkshire Phoenix; 241/9 (50 overs)	v	Worcestershire Royals; 227/8 (50 overs)
A McGrath 74 (94); WPUJC Vaas 3/38 [10]		Z de Bruyn 82 (95); IJ Harvey 3/41 [10]

Yorkshire won by 14 runs
Headingley, Leeds
Umpires: IJ Gould and R Palmer
Player of the match: Z de Bruyn (Worcs)

Yorkshire batted first at Headingley and fared poorly at first, slumping to 88 for 4 when Michael Vaughan cut the ball from Zander de Bruyn onto his stumps. Craig White and Anthony McGrath then put on 83 in 22 overs, and late hitting gave Yorkshire a defendable total of 241 for 9 with 52 off the last 5 overs. The Worcestershire innings followed a similar course. First they were reduced to 50 for 3, and then Kabir Ali (67) and Zander de Bruyn (82) came together, putting on 117. White then interrupted them, taking three wickets. The run-chase was thus effectively curtailed, and Worcestershire finished well behind on 227 for 8. (Cricinfo scorecard)

18 May 2005
Scorecard

Nottinghamshire Outlaws; 195/9 (50 overs)	v	Sussex Sharks; 197/6 (47 overs)
SR Patel 61 (52); RJ Kirtley 2/35 [10]		MW Goodwin 59 (84); MA Ealham 2/24 [10]

Sussex won by 4 wickets
County Ground, Hove
Umpires: MR Benson and JF Steele
Player of the match: CD Hopkinson (Sssx)

Nottinghamshire got off to a bad start at Hove by losing their first 3 wickets for only 12 runs. They continued to lose wickets at regular intervals until the score moved on to 111 for 8, when Samit Patel (61) and Gareth Clough (22) came together and lifted the total to 195 for 9 off the 50 overs. Three Nottinghamshire batsmen were run out. Sussex immediately lost Ian Ward and Mike Yardy, moving to 1 run for 2 wickets. However, the ship was steadied with half-centuries from Murray Goodwin and Carl Hopkinson and they eventually eased through with 3 wickets and 18 balls to go. The win, however, came at a price for Sussex, who now had to play Lancashire away in the next round, rather than host the touring Australians in a 3-day game. The cost of the win was estimated at £50,000. (Cricinfo scorecard)

=== Quarter-finals ===
15 July 2005
Scorecard

Lancashire Lightning; 249/8 (50 overs)	v	Sussex Sharks; 214/8 (50 overs)
A Symonds 101 (121); Naved-ul-Hasan 3/39 [10]		MJ Prior 59 (90); A Flintoff 3/30 [9]

Lancashire won by 35 runs
Old Trafford, Manchester
Umpires: JH Evans and JW Holder
Player of the match: A Symonds (Lancs)

Andrew Symonds scored 101 and took two wickets for 46 to be the difference between the teams at Old Trafford. Having been sent in to bat, Lancashire owed much of their success to a partnership of 118 between Symonds and Marcus North, and good lower-order hitting took the total to 249 for 8, despite three wickets each from Sussex' Pakistanis, Rana Naved-ul-Hasan and Mushtaq Ahmed. The Sussex chase looked on when they were 112 for 1 with Matt Prior and Chris Adams at the crease, as they were just waiting for opportunities to up the run-rate, but instead Symonds and England all-rounder Andrew Flintoff ran through them with the ball, and Robin Martin-Jenkins and Ahmed eventually had to consolidate to 214 for 8, losing by 35 runs. (Cricinfo scorecard)

15 July 2005
Scorecard

Surrey Brown Caps; 356/6 (50 overs)	v	Hampshire Hawks; 359/8 (47.5 overs)
JN Batty 158 (149); SM Ervine 2/47 [7]		SR Watson 132 (105); TJ Murtagh 2/63 [8.5]

Hampshire won by 2 wickets
The Oval, London
Umpires: NJ Llong and P Willey
Player of the match: SR Watson (Hants)

Despite an unbeaten 158 from Jonathan Batty, Surrey still lost their quarter-final game at The Oval, having first batted to make 358 for 6 in 50 overs. James Benning with 73, and Graham Thorpe with 60, also contributed, as Hampshire used seven bowlers who all failed to keep their conceded runs below six an over. In reply, Azhar Mahmood served up a wicket maiden over in the first over of Hampshire's innings, leaving Hampshire 359 to win with nine wickets in hand, but Shane Watson and Craig McMillan put the visitors from the south back on track with a partnership of 81 for the fourth wicket. When McMillan was run out, Hampshire were 200 for 4, but Watson powered on to make 132, his highest career List A cricket score to boost Hampshire to 342 for 8 when Tim Murtagh broke through his defences. By then, it was too late, as Shaun Udal completed his 44 not out, having added 63 with Watson for the eighth wicket earlier, and Hampshire made it to the target with thirteen balls to spare - although they had been given eleven extra balls due to no-balls and wides. (Cricinfo scorecard)

15 July 2005
Scorecard

Kent Spitfires; 259/6 (50 overs)	v	Warwickshire Bears; 261/5 (46.1 overs)
AJ Hall 62 (83); AGR Loudon 2/37 (8 overs)		NV Knight 112* (126); JM Kemp 3/43 [10]

Warwickshire won by 5 wickets
Edgbaston, Birmingham
Umpires: IJ Gould and G Sharp
Player of the match: NV Knight (Warks)

Andrew Hall and Rob Key gave Kent some hope of winning the match at Edgbaston with their opening partnership of 120 runs, but spinners Ashley Giles and Alex Loudon broke through twice each to limit the final score to 259 for 6. Warwickshire's reply centred on former England ODI player Nic Knight, who made fourteen fours in his 27th one-day century. Three wickets from Justin Kemp had earlier set Warwickshire back to 118 for 3, but Knight and Trevor Penney who made 50 not out off 43 balls, guided Warwickshire to the target with nearly four overs to spare. (Cricinfo scorecard)

16 July 2005
Scorecard

Yorkshire Phoenix; 270 (50 overs)	v	Northamptonshire Steelbacks; 237 (48.1 overs)
MJ Lumb 89 (108); DG Wright 3/39 [10]		U Afzaal 57 (62); IJ Harvey 2/46 [10]

Yorkshire won by 33 runs
Headingley, Leeds
Umpires: TE Jesty and AGT Whitehead
Player of the match: MJ Lumb (Yorks)

Michael Lumb with 89 and Ian Harvey with 74 lifted Yorkshire to 270 all out at Headingley in the fourth quarter-final of the C&G Trophy. It was a bit of an implosion from 227 for 3, but runs came thick and fast in that period, so Yorkshire wouldn't be too disappointed with losing their wickets. Northamptonshire started well, getting to 163 for 2 after all their top four got starts, but two wickets from England Test bowler Matthew Hoggard started to turn the match. From then on, the Northamptonshire effort just stopped dead, as they lost five wickets for 24 runs to fall to 216 for 9. Steffan Jones and Jason Brown paired up for 21 for the last wicket, but it was too little, too late.

=== Semi-finals ===
20 August 2005
Scorecard

Yorkshire Phoenix; 197/9 (50 overs)	v	Hampshire Hawks; 199/2 (39.9 overs)
MJ Lumb 43 (62); SR Watson 2/29 [9]		SM Ervine 100 (99); GJ Kruis 1/23 [10]

Hampshire won by 8 wickets
Rose Bowl, Southampton
Umpires: AA Jones and AGT Whitehead
Player of the match: SM Ervine (Hants)

Yorkshire never managed to score in the semi-final match at The Rose Bowl, which meant that Hampshire were set a relatively easy target of 198 to win. Michael Lumb top-scored with 43, but the late order failed to score runs quickly enough to get past 200; number ten John Blain only made six off 20 deliveries, while number nine Tim Bresnan made three off ten. Yorkshireman Deon Kruis served up some economical bowling early on to John Crawley, and bowled him for a 28-ball 8, but a 147-run partnership between Nic Pothas and Sean Ervine saw Hampshire right on track, as they won with over 10 overs to spare. Ervine made his second List A century, off 96 balls, but was caught and bowled by Richard Dawson three balls later. It didn't matter much - Hampshire only needed 20 runs to win, and Shane Watson and Nic Pothas knocked them off to book Hampshire's place in the C&G Trophy final. (Cricinfo scorecard)

20 August 2005
Scorecard

Warwickshire Bears; 236/7 (50 overs)	v	Lancashire Lightning; 137 (38 overs)
IJL Trott 49 (74); MJ North 3/31 [8]		SG Law 47 (48); NM Carter 4/26 [6]

Warwickshire won by 99 runs
Edgbaston, Birmingham
Umpires: JH Hampshire and NA Mallender
Player of the match: T Frost

Warwickshire put in a fine bowling effort to send Lancashire out of the C&G Trophy, despite Lancashire's Australian Marcus North taking three wickets. North's bowling - and others, Sajid Mahmood took two wickets - set Warwickshire back to 155 for 7, but Michael Powell and Tony Frost put on an eighth-wicket partnership of 81 runs to carry Warwickshire to a total of 236 for 8 after 50 overs. Lancashire looked on track when Mal Loye and Stuart Law negotiated some tricky early bowling to put on 49 for the fourth wicket and see the score to 80 for 3, but medium pacer Jamie Anyon took two wickets, and a fiery spell from Neil Carter, which included two wickets to see him end with four for 26, had Lancashire bowled out for 137. (Cricinfo scorecard)

=== Final ===
3 September 2005
Scorecard

Hampshire Hawks; 290 (50 overs)	v	Warwickshire Bears; 272 (49.2 overs)
SM Ervine 104 (93); NM Carter 5/66 [10]		NV Knight 118 (127); SR Watson 3/34 [8]

Hampshire won by 18 runs
Lord's, London
Umpires: AA Jones and NA Mallender
Player of the match: SM Ervine (Hants)

- This was the first 50 overs-a-side English domestic final to be played with coloured clothing and white balls.

Hampshire became the third team to win a major county trophy in 2005, as they prevailed in a high-scoring final at Lord's, leaving only the County Championship left for grabs. Nic Pothas and Sean Ervine added 136 runs for the second wicket to propel Hampshire to a big total against Warwickshire, whose bowlers gave away 20 runs from wides but still managed to bowl Hampshire out on the last ball. Ervine was fifth out, taking 91 balls for his second successive C&G century, before he was caught off Jonathan Trott, who finished with three wickets for 35 runs. Neil Carter took five wickets to redeem his 66 conceded runs, while Makhaya Ntini bowled two maiden overs for Warwickshire, but went wicketless.

Warwickshire were set to chase 291 to win, and Carter fulfilled his job as a pinch hitter well, scoring four fours and one six en route to 32, and Nick Knight and Ian Bell kept up with the required run rate well. However, Bell suffered cramps just before he reached 50, and that limited his movements - he succumbed shortly afterwards, chipping a simple catch to Chris Tremlett and was gone for 54. The other batsmen tried to add runs with Knight, but yielded to the Hampshire bowling and fielding effort, and when Knight was finally dismissed for 118 Warwickshire needed 40 runs for the last three wickets. Shane Watson effectively stopped that, having Dougie Brown and Ashley Giles out bowled, leaving Warwickshire to hit about 20 runs in the last over. It was too much for Makhaya Ntini, who was bowled by Chris Tremlett with the second ball of the last over, and thus Hampshire took an 18-run victory. (Cricinfo scorecard)
