= Charl Pietersen =

South African cricketer (born 1983)

Personal information
- Born: 6 January 1983 (age 43); Kimberley, Cape Province, South Africa
- Batting: Left-handed
- Bowling: Left-arm medium-fast
- Role: Bowler

Domestic team information
- Years: Team
- 2003–2012: Griqualand West
- 2005–2006: Northamptonshire County Cricket Club
- 2012: Impi
- First-class debut: 2001/02 Griqualand West v KwaZulu-Natal

Career statistics
Competition	FC	LA	T20
Matches	85	69	10
Runs scored	3,135	944	131
Batting average	29.85	26.22	26.20
100s/50s	2/13	1/2	0/0
Top score	140	106*	43*
Balls bowled	12,680	2,625	192
Wickets	255	74	11
Bowling average	27.65	30.79	21.81
5 wickets in innings	9	1	0
10 wickets in match	0	0	0
Best bowling	6/29	7/10	3/20
Catches/stumpings	35/–	14/–	4/–
- Source: ESPNcricinfo, 14 July 2019

Charl Pietersen (born 6 January 1983) is a South African cricketer who played for the Eagles cricket team. He is a distant relative of Kevin Pietersen. His brother Ruan Pietersen also played for Griqualand West as a left-arm bowler. Despite being South African Pietersen played County cricket in England under the Kolpak regulations for Northamptonshire County Cricket Club. On debut for Northamptonshire in 2005, he took 7–10 in a C&G Trophy game against Denmark at Svanholm Park, Brøndby, a county record.
