= 2012 Europe Twenty20 Division Two =

2012 ICC European T20 Championship Division Two
- Administrator: International Cricket Council
- Cricket format: Twenty20
- Tournament format: Round-robin
- Host: Greece
- Champions: Isle of Man (1st title)
- Participants: 12
- Matches: 42
- Player of the series: (Cyprus) Muhammad Mohsin
- Most runs: (Spain) Tariq Ali (476)
- Most wickets: (Cyprus) Muhammad Mohsin (14)
- Official website: ICC European Championship

The 2012 ICC European Twenty20 Championship Division Two is a cricket tournament that took place between 3–8 September 2012. It forms part of the European Cricket Championship. Greece hosted the event.

== Teams ==
Teams that qualified are as follows:

=== Group A ===
- Israel
- Portugal
- Spain
- Luxembourg
- Malta
- Estonia

=== Group B ===
- Croatia
- Isle of Man
- Greece
- Finland
- Cyprus
- Sweden

== Squads ==
Croatia	Cyprus	Estonia	Finland
John Vujnovich (c); Jasen Butkovic; Nikola Davidovic; Istok Dordevic; Jeffrey Grzinic; Michael Grzinic; Josip Jukic; Pero Kastelan; Peter Mackelworth (wk); Paul Musin; Ivan Pazanin; Craig Sinovich; Vivek Sharma; Damir Svilicic	Michalis Kyriacou (c); Dhanuka Agathocleous; Dineja Agathocleous (wk); Ian Comina; Nimal Durayalage; Syed Hussain; Stelios Michaelides; Muhammad Mohsin; Andrew Mulkern; George Papaonisiforou; Niroshan Pelawattha; Gurbhej Singh; Ravi Suhasaria; Malik Tariq	Tim Heath (C); Sivalingam Arunachalam; Timothy Filer; Vineeth Govind; Murali Obili; Moshiur Rahman; Remo Raud; Nand Lal Riar; Sasha Ruut; Mart Tammoja; Mario Tammoja; Michael Tiffin; Marko Vaik (wk); Peter van Buuren	Amrik Bhatia (c); Madhu Bhandari; Shakil Islam; Zahidullah Kamal; Ekhpelwak Kuchey; Bilal Khan; Karimullah Malekzaei; Obaidullah Sadiqui; Roholah Sadiqui; Tariq Sarfraz; Jonathan Scamans; Christopher Shaw; Michael Shaw (wk); Tatu Vehvilainen (wk)

Greece	Isle of Man	Israel	Luxembourg
Nic Pothas (c) (wk); Mehmood Ahmed; Stamatios Giourgas; Spyridon Goustis; Andreas Koutsoufis; Anastasios Manousis; Aslam Mohammad; Christos Molinaris (wk); Othonas Nikitas; Spyridon Nikokavouras; Zois Ntemsias; Alexis Souvlakis; Dimitrios Triantafillidis; Ioannis Vasilas	Gareth Dawson (c); Gregory Hawke; Daniel Hawke; Daniel Kniveton; Richard Kniveton (wk); Philip Littlejohns; Gareth Morris; Russell Miller; Garreth Roome; Alex Stokoe; Max Stokoe; Arnie van den Berg; Oliver Webster; Mark Williams	Herschel Gutman (c); Raymond Aston; Shailesh Bangera (wk); Josh Evans; Gerrit Grundling; Danny Hotz; Daniel Hyman; Yefet Nagavakar; Kapila Perere; Yaniv Razpurker; Gabriel Schachat; Steven Shein; Eshkol Solomon; Shifron Waskar	Tony Whiteman (c); James Barker; Timothy Barker; Wayne Codd; Graham Cope (wk); William Cope; Taral Desai; Christopher Evans; Nishith Gandhi; Piran Merkl; Joost Mees; Richard Neale; Anand Pattabiraman; Madhu Ramachandran

Malta	Portugal	Spain	Sweden
Andrew Naudi (c); George Agius; Derek Ali; Samuel Aquilina; Justin Brooke; David Borg; John Callus; Michael Caruana; Balakrishnan Dhandapani; John Grima (wk); Nowell Khosla; Mark Sacco; Ronald Sacco; Frankie Spiteri	Akbar Saiyad (c); Zafar Ali; Tariq Aziz; Paulo Buccimazza; Syed Bukhari; Nadeem Butt; Khalid Izaz; Rizwan Khaliq (wk); Lakhbir Kensrey; Intesab Medhi; Muhammad Mirza; Nadeem Nazar; Jose Pais; Bilal Safdar	Mark Spencer (c); Nisar Ahmed; Sajad Ali; Tariq Ali; Gary Crompton; Mohib Hussein; Tanveer Iqbal; Armaghan Khan; Farhat Mahmood; James Morgan (wk); Christian Munoz-Mills; Talat Nadeem; Venus Valiente; Mohammad Yasin	Yasir Ikram (c); Khalid Ahmad; Naveed Anjum; Serge Conein; Ashik Imtiaz; Manuj Jadvest; Wakil Jalali; Azam Khalil; Aman Momand; Shahid Mustafa; Sandeep Sharma; Sunny Sharma; Sadat Sidiqi (wk); Christopher Tebbutt (wk)

== Fixtures ==
=== Group stage ===
==== Group A ====
Team	P	W	L	T	NR	Points	NRR
Israel	5	5	0	0	0	10	+1.123
Spain	5	4	1	0	0	8	+3.520
Portugal	5	3	2	0	0	6	–0.553
Estonia	5	2	3	0	0	4	–0.321
Malta	5	1	4	0	0	2	–1.775
Luxembourg	5	0	5	0	0	0	–1.983

3 September
10:30 AM
Scorecard

Spain; 207/6 (20 overs)	v	Luxembourg; 137/7 (20 overs)
James Morgan 100 (53); Richard Neale 3/24 (4 overs)		Joost Mees 40 (30); Farhat Mahmood 3/26 (4 overs)

Spain won by 70 runs
Ropa Valley No 2 Ground, Corfu
Umpires: Heath Kearns (Jer) and David Kenworthy (IOM)

- Luxembourg won the toss and elected to field.

3 September
10:30 AM
Scorecard

Malta; 124/7 (20 overs)	v	Portugal; 128/2 (17.3 overs)
Nowell Khosla 48 (39); Jose Pais 4/15 (4 overs)		Tariq Aziz 55* (56); Justin Brooke 1/21 (4 overs)

Portugal won by 8 wickets
Ropa Valley No 1 Ground, Corfu
Umpires: Tim Jensen (Den) and Keith Smith (Ire)

- Malta won the toss and elected to bat.

3 September
3:30 PM
Scorecard

Estonia; 115/8 (20 overs)	v	Portugal; 120/5 (19.3 overs)
Murali Obili 25 (26); Muhammad Mirza 4/21 (4 overs)		Jose Pais 35 (26); Moshiur Rahman 3/21 (4 overs)

Portugal won by 5 wickets
Ropa Valley No 2 Ground, Corfu
Umpires: David Kenworthy (IOM) and Raymond Waskar (Isr)

- Estonia won the toss and elected to bat.

3 September
3:30 PM
Scorecard

Luxembourg; 88/9 (20 overs)	v	Israel; 90/6 (16.5 overs)
Taral Desai 36 (37); Gerrit Grundling 2/3 (4 overs)		Yaniv Razpurker 19* (30); Madhu Ramachandran 2/18 (4 overs)

Israel won by 4 wickets
Ropa Valley No 1 Ground, Corfu
Umpires: Ashraf Din (Ned) and Tim Jensen (Den)

- Luxembourg won the toss and elected to bat.

4 September
10:30 AM
Scorecard

Spain; 218/6 (20 overs)	v	Estonia; 93/9 (20 overs)
Tariq Ali 150* (66); Sivalingam Arunachalam 3/31 (4 overs)		Tim Heath 40 (22); Sajad Ali 3/17 (4 overs)

Spain won by 125 runs
Maessonghi Ground, Corfu
Umpires: Keith Smith (Ire) and Raymond Waskar (Isr)

- Estonia won the toss and elected to field.

4 September
10:30 AM
Scorecard

Israel; 133/8 (20 overs)	v	Malta; 92/9 (20 overs)
Gabriel Schachat 28 (34); Nowell Khosla 2/14 (4 overs)		Frankie Spiteri 43 (45); Steven Shein 3/21 (4 overs)

Israel won by 41 runs
Ropa Valley No 2 Ground, Corfu
Umpires: Tim Jensen (Den) and David Murphy (Sco)

- Malta won the toss and elected to field.

4 September
3:30 PM
Scorecard

Luxembourg; 151/8 (20 overs)	v	Malta; 151/3 (17.5 overs)
Timothy Barker 55 (45); Derek Ali 2/23 (2 overs)		Andrew Naudi 66* (27); Taral Desai 1/35 (4 overs)

Malta won by 7 wickets
Ropa Valley No 1 Ground, Corfu
Umpires: Heath Kearns (Jer) and Kamran Sadiq (Nor)

- Luxembourg won the toss and elected to bat.

4 September
3:30 PM
Scorecard

Spain; 151/8 (20 overs)	v	Portugal; 151/3 (17.5 overs)
Tariq Ali 148 (55); Intesab Medhi 2/23 (2 overs)		Bilal Safdar 82 (37); Talat Nadeem 3/24 (4 overs)

Spain won by 75 runs
Maessonghi Ground, Corfu
Umpires: Keith Smith (Ire) and Raymond Waskar (Isr)

- Spain won the toss and elected to bat.

5 September
10:30 AM
Scorecard

Estonia; 167/5 (20 overs)	v	Luxembourg; 108/9 (20 overs)
Tim Heath 52* (33); Taral Desai 3/20 (4 overs)		Richard Neale 37 (34); Tim Heath 3/12 (3 overs)

Estonia won by 59 runs
Marina Ground, Corfu
Umpires: David Kenworthy (IOM) and Kamran Sadiq (Nor)

- Estonia won the toss and elected to bat.

5 September
10:30 AM
Scorecard

Israel; 118/5 (20 overs)	v	Portugal; 101/5 (20 overs)
Eshkol Solomon 40 (29); Zafar Ali 2/22 (3 overs)		Tariq Aziz 45 (30); Josh Evans 3/24 (3 overs)

Israel won by 17 runs
Maessonghi Ground, Corfu
Umpires: David Murphy (Sco) and Keith Smith (Ire)

- Portugal won the toss and elected to field.

5 September
3:30 PM
Scorecard

Estonia; 184/3 (20 overs)	v	Malta; 128 (18.4 overs)
Nand Lal Riar 71 (46); Michael Caruana 1/9 (2 overs)		Frankie Spiteri 22 (16); Sivalingam Arunachalam 2/12 (3 overs)

Estonia won by 56 runs
Maessonghi Ground, Corfu
Umpires: Heath Kearns (Jer) and David Murphy (Sco)

- Estonia won the toss and elected to bat.

5 September
3:30 PM
Scorecard

Spain; 142/6 (20 overs)	v	Israel; 143/4 (18.5 overs)
James Morgan 37 (43); Kapila Perere 2/24 (4 overs)		Herschel Gutman 43 (43); Armaghan Khan 2/21 (4 overs)

Israel won by 6 wickets
Marina Ground, Corfu
Umpires: Tim Jensen (Den) and David Kenworthy (IOM)

- Israel won the toss and elected to field.

6 September
10:30 AM
Scorecard

Portugal; 165/5 (20 overs)	v	Luxembourg; 119/4 (15 overs)
Tariq Aziz 85* (65); Christopher Evans 2/21 (4 overs)		Joost Mees 40 (33); Nadeem Nazar 2/27 (3 overs)

Portugal won by 11 runs (D/L)
Marina Ground, Corfu
Umpires: Heath Kearns (Jer) and Keith Smith (Ire)

- Luxembourg won the toss and elected to field.
- Rain stopped play after 1.4 overs in Luxembourg's innings, revising the target to 131 runs from 15 overs via the Duckworth–Lewis method.

6 September
3:30 PM
Scorecard

Malta; 119 (19.2 overs)	v	Spain; 121/0 (11.2 overs)
Andrew Naudi 29 (23); Mark Spencer 3/10 (3.2 overs)		Tariq Ali 58* (34)

Spain won by 10 wickets
Ropa Valley No 2 Ground, Corfu
Umpires: Kamran Sadiq (Nor) and Raymond Waskar (Isr)

- Malta won the toss and elected to bat.

6 September
3:30 PM
Scorecard

Estonia; 154/3 (20 overs)	v	Israel; 155/5 (18.2 overs)
Nand Lal Riar 59 (34); Eshkol Solomon 1/7 (3 overs)		Eshkol Solomon 85* (52); Nand Lal Riar 2/20 (3 overs)

Israel won by 5 wickets
Ropa Valley No 1 Ground, Corfu
Umpires: David Kenworthy (IOM) and Charlie McElwee (Ire)

- Estonia won the toss and elected to bat.

==== Group B ====
Team	P	W	L	T	NR	Points	NRR
Sweden	5	4	1	0	0	8	+0.762
Isle of Man	5	3	2	0	0	6	+1.132
Greece	5	3	2	0	0	6	–0.045
Finland	5	3	2	0	0	6	–0.245
Cyprus	5	2	3	0	0	4	+0.038
Croatia	5	0	5	0	0	0	–1.411

3 September
10:30 AM
Scorecard

Isle of Man; 166/3 (20 overs)	v	Cyprus; 147/8 (18.2 overs)
Gareth Morris 43 (37); Gurbhej Singh 1/15 (4 overs)		Syed Hussain 51 (27); Alex Stokoe 3/33 (3 overs)

Isle of Man won by 19 runs
Maessonghi Ground, Corfu
Umpires: Charlie McElwee (Ire) and Kamran Sadiq (Nor)

- Isle of Man won the toss and elected to bat.

3 September
3:30 PM
Scorecard

Croatia; 95/6 (20 overs)	v	Finland; 96/3 (17.3 overs)
Craig Sinovich 36* (45); Amrik Bhatia 3/13 (3 overs)		Zahidullah Kamal 55* (54); Michael Grzinic 2/11 (4 overs)

Finland won by 7 wickets
Maessonghi Ground, Corfu
Umpires: Ashraf Din (Ned) and David Kenworthy (IOM)

- Croatia won the toss and elected to bat.

3 September
3:30 PM
Scorecard

Isle of Man; 136/6 (20 overs)	v	Sweden; 137/5 (18.1 overs)
Max Stokoe 27 (43); Azam Khalil 3/21 (4 overs)		Christopher Tebbutt 57 (45); Garreth Roome 2/25 (4 overs)

Sweden won by 5 wickets
Marina Ground, Corfu
Umpires: David Murphy (Sco) and Paul Simpson (Ire)

- Isle of Man won the toss and elected to bat.

4 September
10:30 AM
Scorecard

Croatia; 100/5 (20 overs)	v	Cyprus; 101/2 (15 overs)
Craig Sinovich 43 (48); Muhammad Mohsin 3/25 (4 overs)		Syed Hussain 32 (22); Paul Musin 1/21 (4 overs)

Cyprus won by 8 wickets
Marina Ground, Corfu
Umpires: Ashraf Din (Ned) and Paul Simpson (Ire)

- Croatia won the toss and elected to bat.

4 September
10:30 AM
Scorecard

Greece; 114/4 (20 overs)	v	Sweden; 115/9 (19.2 overs)
Nic Pothas 42* (41); Aman Momand 2/15 (4 overs)		Sadat Sidiqi 41 (39); Dimitrios Triantafillidis 3/23 (4 overs)

Sweden won by 1 wicket
Ropa Valley No 1 Ground, Corfu
Umpires: Heath Kearns (Jer) and Brian Papworth (Sco)

- Sweden won the toss and elected to field.

4 September
3:30 PM
Scorecard

Finland; 128/9 (20 overs)	v	Cyprus; 120/2 (20 overs)
Michael Shaw 39 (47); Dineja Agathocleous 4/23 (4 overs)		Muhammad Mohsin 65* (55); Tariq Sarfraz 1/11 (4 overs)

Sweden won by 1 wicket
Marina Ground, Corfu
Umpires: David Kenworthy (IOM) and Paul Simpson (Ire)

- Cyprus won the toss and elected to field.

4 September
3:30 PM
Scorecard

Isle of Man; 185/3 (20 overs)	v	Greece; 83 (17.2 overs)
Gareth Morris 66 (44); Spyridon Goustis 2/34 (4 overs)		Mehmood Ahmed 20 (20); Arnie van den Berg 3/18 (4 overs)

Isle of Man won by 102 runs
Ropa Valley No 2 Ground, Corfu
Umpires: Tim Jensen (Den) and Charlie McElwee (Ire)

- Isle of Man won the toss and elected to bat.

5 September
10:30 AM
Scorecard

Croatia; 86/7 (20 overs)	v	Isle of Man; 87/4 (16.5 overs)
Michael Grzinic 34 (46); Arnie van den Berg 3/13 (4 overs)		Philip Littlejohns 43* (44); Michael Grzinic 2/16 (4 overs)

Isle of Man won by 6 wickets
Ropa Valley No 1 Ground, Corfu
Umpires: Charlie McElwee (Ire) and Raymond Waskar (Isr)

- Croatia won the toss and elected to bat.

5 September
10:30 AM
Scorecard

Finland; 136 (19.5 overs)	v	Sweden; 137/4 (17.3 overs)
Ekhpelwak Kuchey 73 (46); Khalid Ahmad 5/21 (3.5 overs)		Shahid Mustafa 66* (57); Tariq Sarfraz 3/19 (4 overs)

Sweden won by 6 wickets
Ropa Valley No 2 Ground, Corfu
Umpires: Ashraf Din (Ned) and Brian Papworth (Sco)

- Sweden won the toss and elected to field.

5 September
3:30 PM
Scorecard

Sweden; 125 (18.2 overs)	v	Cyprus; 137/4 (17.3 overs)
Christopher Tebbutt 31 (33); Niroshan Pelawattha 3/22 (2.2 overs)		Muhammad Mohsin 49 (39); Khalid Ahmad 2/20 (2.4 overs)

Cyprus won by 7 wickets
Ropa Valley No 1 Ground, Corfu
Umpires: Charlie McElwee (Ire) and Paul Simpson (Ire)

- Sweden won the toss and elected to bat.

5 September
3:30 PM
Scorecard

Croatia; 129/5 (19.5 overs)	v	Greece; 130/0 (17.4 overs)
John Vujnovich 50 (59); Mehmood Ahmed 2/28 (4 overs)		Anastasios Manousis 71* (55)

Greece won by 10 wickets
Ropa Valley No 2 Ground, Corfu
Umpires: Ashraf Din (Ned) and Brian Papworth (Sco)

- Croatia won the toss and elected to bat.

6 September
10:30 AM
Scorecard

Isle of Man; 82 (19.2 overs)	v	Finland; 84/4 (17 overs)
Garreth Roome 21 (10); Madhu Bhandari 4/12 (4 overs)		Bilal Khan 35* (20); Arnie van den Berg 2/14 (4 overs)

Finland won by 6 wickets
Ropa Valley No 1 Ground, Corfu
Umpires: Ashraf Din (Ned) and David Murphy (Sco)

- Finland won the toss and elected to field.

6 September
10:30 AM
Scorecard

Cyprus; 138/7 (20 overs)	v	Greece; 139/3 (15.4 overs)
Muhammad Mohsin 55 (40); Mehmood Ahmed 3/39 (4 overs)		Aslam Mohammad 60 (24); Gurbhej Singh 2/26 (4 overs)

Greece won by 7 wickets
Maessonghi Ground, Corfu
Umpires: Tim Jensen (Den) and Paul Simpson (Ire)

- Greece won the toss and elected to field.

6 September
3:30 PM
Scorecard

Greece; 211/8 (20 overs)	v	Finland; 158/9 (20 overs)
Aslam Mohammad 80 (40); Bilal Khan 2/24 (4 overs)		Ekhpelwak Kuchey 54 (49); Dimitrios Triantafillidis 4/29 (4 overs)

Greece won by 53 runs
Maessonghi Ground, Corfu
Umpires: Brian Papworth (Sco) and Paul Simpson (Ire)

- Finland won the toss and elected to field.

6 September
3:30 PM
Scorecard

Croatia; 63 (17.2 overs)	v	Sweden; 66/2 (11.1 overs)
John Vujnovich 12 (22); Khalid Ahmad 2/12 (4 overs)		Sadat Sidiqi 40* (28); Josip Jukic 1/11 (2 overs)

Greece won by 53 runs
Marina Ground, Corfu
Umpires: Heath Kearns (Jer) and Keith Smith (Ire)

- Croatia won the toss and elected to bat.

=== Play-offs ===
==== Semi-final ====
7 September
10:30 AM
Scorecard

Spain; 190/6 (20 overs)	v	Sweden; 191/9 (20 overs)
Tariq Ali 35 (23); Aman Momand 2/24 (4 overs)		Christopher Tebbutt 59 (35); Mark Spencer 4/30 (3 overs)

Sweden won by 1 wicket
Marina Ground, Corfu
Umpires: David Kenworthy (IOM) and Brian Papworth (Sco)

- Spain won the toss and elected to bat.

==== Semi-final ====
7 September
3:30 PM
Scorecard

Isle of Man; 136/7 (20 overs)	v	Israel; 97 (18.3 overs)
Gareth Morris 53 (48); Josh Evans 3/9 (4 overs)		Josh Evans 34 (35); Mark Williams 3/13 (4 overs)

Isle of Man won by 39 runs
Marina Ground, Corfu
Umpires: Tim Jensen (Den) and Charlie McElwee (Ire)

- Isle of Man won the toss and elected to bat.

==== 9th-place play-off semi-final ====
7 September
10:30 AM
Scorecard

Malta; 127/8 (20 overs)	v	Croatia; 128/6 (19.2 overs)
Nowell Khosla 43 (39); Michael Grzinic 3/18 (4 overs)		Michael Grzinic 42 (36); Michael Caruana 2/17 (4 overs)

Croatia won by 4 wickets
Maessonghi Ground, Corfu
Umpires: Ashraf Din (Ned) and Keith Smith (Ire)

- Croatia won the toss and elected to field.

==== 9th-place play-off semi-final ====
7 September
3:30 PM
Scorecard

Luxembourg; 142/8 (20 overs)	v	Cyprus; 115/9 (20 overs)
Timothy Barker 39 (31); Muhammad Mohsin 3/31 (4 overs)		Nimal Durayalage 29 (17); Christopher Evans 2/15 (4 overs)

Luxembourg won by 27 runs
Maessonghi Ground, Corfu
Umpires: Ashraf Din (Ned) and Heath Kearns (Jer)

- Cyprus won the toss and elected to field.

==== 5th-place play-off semi-final ====
7 September
10:30 AM
Scorecard

Estonia; 113/7 (20 overs)	v	Greece; 114/3 (18.2 overs)
Timothy Filer 45 (44); Dimitrios Triantafillidis 2/12 (4 overs)		Andreas Koutsoufis 27* (32); Moshiur Rahman 1/10 (3 overs)

Greece won by 7 wickets
Ropa Valley No 2 Ground, Corfu
Umpires: David Murphy (Sco) and Kamran Sadiq (Nor)

- Greece won the toss and elected to field.

==== 5th-place play-off semi-final ====
7 September
3:30 PM
Scorecard

Portugal; 120 (19.4 overs)	v	Finland; 121/6 (19.3 overs)
Rizwan Khaliq 30 (31); Tariq Sarfraz 3/9 (4 overs)		Jonathan Scamans 39 (44); Intesab Medhi 2/22 (4 overs)

Finland won by 4 wickets
Ropa Valley No 1 Ground, Corfu
Umpires: Paul Simpson (Ire) and Raymond Waskar (Isr)

- Portugal won the toss and elected to bat.

==== 11th-place play-off ====
8 September
10:30 AM
Scorecard

Malta; 96 (18.1 overs)	v	Cyprus; 97/0 (11.2 overs)
Nowell Khosla 26 (28); Dineja Agathocleous 5/12 (4 overs)		Muhammad Mohsin 58* (35)

Cyprus won by 10 wickets
Marina Ground, Corfu
Umpires: Ashraf Din (Ned) and Paul Simpson (Ire)

- Malta won the toss and elected to bat.

==== 9th-place play-off ====
8 September
10:30 AM
Scorecard

Luxembourg; 136 (20 overs)	v	Croatia; 116/6 (20 overs)
Taral Desai 52 (25); Paul Musin 3/31 (3 overs)		Michael Grzinic 49 (43); Richard Neale 2/21 (4 overs)

Luxembourg won by 20 runs
Ropa Valley No 2 Ground, Corfu
Umpires: Kamran Sadiq (Nor) and Raymond Waskar (Isr)

- Croatia won the toss and elected to field.

==== 7th-place play-off ====
8 September
3:30 PM
Scorecard

Portugal; 164/8 (20 overs)	v	Estonia; 133/8 (20 overs)
Khalil Izaz 49 (26); Vineeth Govind 3/17 (4 overs)		Moshiur Rahman 47 (28); Khalil Izaz 2/20 (4 overs)

Portugal won by 31 runs
Ropa Valley No 2 Ground, Corfu
Umpires: Kamran Sadiq (Nor) and Raymond Waskar (Isr)

- Portugal won the toss and elected to bat.

==== 5th-place play-off ====
8 September
3:30 PM
Scorecard

Greece; 169/6 (20 overs)	v	Finland; 123/3 (20 overs)
Nic Pothas 68 (40); Madhu Bhandari 2/21 (3 overs)		Jonathan Scamans 37* (30); Mehmood Ahmed 1/12 (4 overs)

Greece won by 46 runs
Ropa Valley No 1 Ground, Corfu
Umpires: Tim Jensen (Den) and Keith Smith (Ire)

- Greece won the toss and elected to bat.

==== 3rd-place play-off ====
8 September
10:30 AM
Scorecard

Spain; 258/8 (20 overs)	v	Israel; 168/4 (20 overs)
Tariq Ali 58 (18); Shailesh Bangera 3/32 (3 overs)		Shailesh Bangera 64* (43); Talat Nadeem 2/27 (4 overs)

Spain won by 90 runs
Maessonghi Ground, Corfu
Umpires: Heath Kearns (Jer) and David Kenworthy (IOM)

- Spain won the toss and elected to bat.

==== Final ====
8 September
3:30 PM
Scorecard

Sweden; 122/7 (20 overs)	v	Isle of Man; 124/2 (14.5 overs)
Sunny Sharma 24 (23); Mark Williams 3/23 (4 overs)		Gareth Morris 71 (41); Azam Khalil 2/21 (3.5 overs)

Isle of Man won by 8 wickets
Ropa Valley No 1 Ground, Corfu
Umpires: Charlie McElwee (Ire) and Brian Papworth (Sco)

- Isle of Man won the toss and elected to field.
- Isle of Man won the 2012 ICC European T20 Championship Division Two and qualified for 2013 Europe Division One as a result of this match.

== Statistics ==
=== Most Runs ===
The top five run scorers (total runs) are included in this table.

Player	Team	Runs	Inns	Avg	S/R	HS	100s	50s
Tariq Ali	Spain	476	7	95.20	214.41	150*	2	2
Muhammad Mohsin	Cyprus	305	7	76.25	129.23	65*	0	3
Gareth Morris	Isle of Man	275	7	39.28	127.90	71	0	3
Tariq Aziz	Portugal	242	7	48.40	113.08	85*	0	2
Aslam Mohammad	Greece	237	6	47.40	146.29	80	0	2

=== Most Wickets ===
The top five wicket takers (total wickets) are listed in this table.

Player	Team	Wkts	Mts	Ave	S/R	Econ	BBI
Muhammad Mohsin	Cyprus	14	7	11.42	9.9	6.90	4/16
Dimitrios Triantafillidis	Greece	12	7	12.25	13.5	5.44	4/29
Azam Khalil	Sweden	12	7	14.50	11.9	7.30	3/21
Arnie van den Berg	Isle of Man	11	6	9.00	12.5	4.30	3/13
Tariq Sarfraz	Finland	11	5	11.90	14.7	4.85	3/9

== Final Placings ==
After the conclusion of the tournament the teams were distributed as follows:

Pos	Team	Promotion/relegation
1st	Isle of Man	Promoted to 2013 Europe Division One
2nd	Sweden	Promoted to 2013 Europe Division One
3rd	Spain	Remain in 2014 Europe Division Two
4th	Israel	Remain in 2014 Europe Division Two
5th	Greece	Remain in 2014 Europe Division Two
6th	Finland	Remain in 2014 Europe Division Two
7th	Portugal	Remain in 2014 Europe Division Two
8th	Estonia	Remain in 2014 Europe Division Two
9th	Luxembourg	Remain in 2014 Europe Division Two
10th	Croatia	Remain in 2014 Europe Division Two
11th	Cyprus	Remain in 2014 Europe Division Two
12th	Malta	Relegated to 2014 Europe Division Three

== See also ==
- 2012 ICC World Twenty20 Qualifier
- European Cricket Championship
