= European Affiliates Championship =

The European Affiliates Championship, formerly the ECC Trophy was a cricket tournament administered by the European Cricket Council for teams representing European countries. It was first played in 1999 and was last played in 2005. It has since been replaced by Division Three of the European Cricket Championship.

== 1999 tournament ==
The 1999 tournament was played in Corfu, Greece and was won by the hosts, who beat Portugal in the final.

=== Final placings ===
1. Greece
2. Portugal
3. Sweden
4. Switzerland
5. Austria
6. Malta
7. Belgium

== 2001 tournament ==
The 2001 tournament was played in Seebarn (25 km from Vienna) and Velden in Austria. Ten teams featured this time, with Croatia, Finland and Spain playing for the first time. The tournament was won by Portugal, who beat Austria in the final.

=== Final placings ===
1. Portugal
2. Austria
3. Belgium/Malta
4. Greece
5. Spain
6. Finland
7. Switzerland
8. Croatia
9. Sweden

== 2003 tournament ==
The 2003 tournament was played in Seebarn and Vienna, Austria. Eleven teams played this time, with Sweden missing from the 2001 event, and with Luxembourg and Norway playing for the first time. Norway eventually won the tournament.

=== Final standings ===
1. Norway
2. Austria
3. Greece
4. Malta
5. Portugal
6. Belgium
7. Spain
8. Finland
9. Switzerland
10. Croatia
11. Luxembourg

== 2005 tournament ==
The 2005 tournament was played in Antwerp, Belgium. The tournament was cut back to nine teams for this event. Austria, Luxembourg and Switzerland were missing from the previous tournament, with the Isle of Man featuring for the first time. The tournament was won by Norway, who qualified for Division Two of the European Championship along with Greece.

=== Final standings ===
1. Norway
2. Greece
3. Spain
4. Belgium
5. Portugal
6. Malta
7. Croatia
8. Isle of Man
9. Finland

== See also ==
- European Cricket Championship
