= List of Portugal Twenty20 International cricketers =

This is a list of Portuguese Twenty20 International cricketers. In April 2018, the International Cricket Council (ICC) decided to grant full Twenty20 International (T20I) status to all its members. Therefore, all Twenty20 matches played between Portugal and other ICC members after 1 January 2019 will be eligible for T20I status.

This list comprises all members of the Portugal cricket team who have played at least one T20I match. It is initially arranged in the order in which each player won his first Twenty20 cap. Where more than one player won his first Twenty20 cap in the same match, those players are listed alphabetically by surname. Portugal played their first T20I matches during the 2019 Iberia Cup in October 2019.

== Key ==
General

- ‡ – Captain
- † – Wicket-keeper
- First – Year of debut
- Last – Year of latest game
- Mat – Number of matches played

Batting

- Runs – Runs scored in career
- HS – Highest score
- Avg – Runs scored per dismissal
- 50 – Number of half centuries
- 100 – Centuries scored
- * – Batsman remained not out

Bowling

- Balls – Balls bowled in career
- Wkt – Wickets taken in career
- BBI – Best bowling in an innings
- Ave – Average runs per wicket

Fielding

- Ca – Catches taken
- St – Stumpings affected

== List of players ==
Statistics are correct as of 21 August 2026.

Portugal T20I cricketers
General					Batting					Bowling				Fielding		Ref
No.	Name	First	Last	Mat	Runs	HS	Avg	50	100	Balls	Wkt	BBI	Ave	Ca	St	Ref
1	Aamer Ikram	2019	2019	4	58	23	14.50	0	0	–	–	–	–	0	0	
2	Ali Naqi	2019	2019	4	0	0*	–	–	–	60	2	2/20	32.50	0	0	
3	Arslan Ahmed	2019	2019	3	12	11	4.00	0	0	–	–	–	–	0	0	
4	Paolo Buccimazza‡†	2019	2021	7	8	6*	4.00	0	0	78	3	2/18	28.66	2	0	
5	Fakhrul Mohon	2019	2022	8	20	12*	10.00	0	0	138	3	1/15	55.00	1	0	
6	Imran Khan	2019	2024	10	64	36	9.14	0	0	78	2	1/13	41.50	6	0	
7	Mien Mehmood	2019	2021	7	61	16	8.71	0	0	–	–	–	–	3	0	
8	Najjam Shahzad‡	2019	2025	30	504	53*	24.00	1	0	494	26	3/25	21.53	18	0	
9	Francoise Stoman†	2019	2025	26	138	28	10.61	0	0	354	19	3/16	20.31	9	1	
10	Tariq Aziz	2019	2019	4	40	23	13.33	0	0	96	6	3/20	11.66	0	0	
11	Zohaib Sarwar	2019	2023	14	92	33*	13.14	0	0	145	7	2/8	28.28	2	0	
12	Sukhwinder Singh	2019	2019	1	0	0	0.00	0	0	–	–	–	–	0	0	
13	Amandeep Singh	2021	2025	20	185	25*	14.23	0	0	264	13	3/11	23.15	7	0	
14	Amir Zaib	2021	2024	23	332	45*	19.52	0	0	124	8	2/2	18.12	9	0	
15	Azhar Andani	2021	2024	15	467	100	33.35	2	1	–	–	–	–	3	0	
16	Anthony Chambers	2021	2024	17	281	44	17.56	0	0	–	–	–	–	3	0	
17	Junaid Khan	2021	2024	20	23	14*	7.66	0	0	408	23	3/18	18.00	1	0	
18	Siraj Ullah Khadem	2021	2026	42	90	22	9.00	0	0	854	56	5/17	15.30	7	0	
19	Miguel Stoman	2021	2021	3	6	6*	–	0	0	15	1	1/16	16.00	0	0	
20	Arslan Naseem	2021	2021	1	–	–	–	–	–	–	–	–	–	1	0	
21	Rahul Bhardwaj	2021	2021	1	–	–	–	–	–	–	–	–	–	0	0	
22	Zulfiqar Ali Shah	2021	2021	1	12	12	12.00	0	0	–	–	–	–	0	0	
23	Kuldeep Gholiya†	2022	2023	14	416	80	32.00	3	0	–	–	–	–	13	3	
24	Syed Maisam Ali	2022	2024	10	31	18*	15.50	0	0	157	15	4/14	11.13	4	0	
25	Sharn Gomes	2022	2026	18	522	82*	40.15	5	0	–	–	–	–	7	0	
26	Miguel Machado	2023	2025	11	148	54*	18.50	2	0	–	–	–	–	3	0	
27	Suman Ghimire†	2023	2024	12	265	53*	37.85	0	0	48	2	1/19	34.50	3	1	
28	Mubeen Tariq	2023	2023	1	–	–	–	–	–	12	0	–	–	0	0	
29	Assad Mehmood	2023	2023	2	–	–	–	–	–	42	1	1/16	29.00	0	0	
30	Juan Henri	2024	2026	15	44	25*	8.80	0	0	294	15	2/35	26.40	4	0	
31	Jalpesh Vijay	2024	2025	8	180	42	22.50	0	0	12	0	–	–	6	0	
32	Adnan Gondal	2024	2024	2	–	–	–	–	–	12	0	–	–	0	0	
33	Conrad Greenshields	2025	2026	7	121	67*	40.33	1	0	48	3	3/24	19.33	2	0	
34	Rahulkumar Hashu	2025	2026	21	109	27*	36.33	0	0	319	29	4/17	13.51	14	0	
35	Jeremy Martins	2025	2026	19	255	40	21.25	0	0	238	23	3/11	11.56	16	0	
36	Dhavalkumar Norotam	2025	2026	25	673	84	28.04	4	0	–	–	–	–	13	0	
37	Upen Shantu	2025	2026	22	26	13*	8.66	0	0	436	31	4/23	16.48	4	0	
38	Sherman Vaz	2025	2026	6	8	7	8.00	0	0	96	9	4/22	12.11	6	0	
39	Hardeep Khuttan	2025	2026	12	75	30	15.o	0	0	128	7	3/16	21.57	2	0	
40	Natim Hassam	2025	2026	14	218	52*	31.14	1	0	84	4	2/22	24.25	7	0	
41	Carlos Nunes†	2025	2026	22	289	67	28.90	1	0	–	–	–	–	16	5	
42	Chad Potgieter	2025	2026	13	228	52*	22.80	1	0	–	–	–	–	4	0	
43	Christopher De Freitas	2026	2026	11	438	125	39.81	3	1	12	0	–	–	2	0	
44	Edward Fleming	2026	2026	17	81	36	11.57	0	0	323	20	3/11	15.55	4	0	
45	Sebastian de Oliveira	2026	2026	11	25	18*	12.50	0	0	200	20	4/23	9.90	6	0	
46	Jordan Netto	2026	2026	6	178	41	20.20	0	0	–	–	–	–	2	0	
47	Moises Henriques	2026	2026	4	196	111	65.33	1	1	–	–	–	–	3	0	(Note: Moises Henriques has also played Twenty20 International cricket for Australia. Only his record for Portugal is given above.)
48	Cameron Shekleton	2026	2026	5	100	52*	25.00	1	0	–	–	–	–	5	0	
49	Craig Cachopa	2026	2026	3	45	25	22.50	0	0	–	–	–	–	4	0	
