= List of Israel Twenty20 International cricketers =

This is a list of Israel Twenty20 International cricketers.

In April 2018, the ICC decided to grant full Twenty20 International (T20I) status to all its members. Therefore, all Twenty20 matches played between Israel and other ICC members after 1 January 2019 have the T20I status.

This list comprises all members of the Israel cricket team who have played at least one T20I match. It is initially arranged in the order in which each player won his first Twenty20 cap. Where more than one player won their first Twenty20 cap in the same match, their names are listed alphabetically by surname (according to the name format used by Cricinfo).

Israel played their first match with T20I status on 28 June 2022 against Portugal during the 2022–23 ICC Men's T20 World Cup Europe Qualifier.

== Key ==
General

- ‡ – Captain
- † – Wicket-keeper
- First – Year of debut
- Last – Year of latest game
- Mat – Number of matches played

Batting

- Runs – Runs scored in career
- HS – Highest score
- Avg – Runs scored per dismissal
- * – Batsman remained not out
- 50 – Half-centuries scored

Bowling

- Balls – Balls bowled in career
- Wkt – Wickets taken in career
- BBI – Best bowling in an innings
- Ave – Average runs per wicket

Fielding

- Ca – Catches taken
- St – Stumpings affected

== Players ==
Statistics are correct as of 21 August 2026.

Cap	Name	First	Last	Mat	Batting				Bowling				Fielding		Ref(s)
Cap	Name	First	Last	Mat	Runs	HS	Avg	50	Balls	Wkt	BBI	Ave	Ca	St	Ref(s)
1	Abraham Amado	2022	2022	3	25	16	8.33	0	36	3	2/38	19.33	2	–	
2	Shailesh Bangera†	2022	2026	13	72	23	6.54	0	–	–	–	–	1	0	
3	Michael Cohen†	2022	2022	3	60	28	30.00	0	–	–	–	–	1	2	
4	Josh Evans‡	2022	2024	9	116	42	12.88	0	210	16	4/20	14.81	2	–	
5	Eitamar Kahamker	2022	2022	4	54	19	13.50	0	24	0	–	–	0	–	
6	Niv Nagavkar	2022	2026	18	323	63*	21.53	1	324	12	2/19	35.58	6	–	
7	Yair Nagavkar	2022	2026	13	97	32*	10.77	0	232	11	2/17	25.90	3	–	
8	Eliezar Samson	2022	2022	3	3	3*	3.00	0	48	2	1/12	33.00	0	–	
9	Gabriel Schachat	2022	2026	7	142	66	35.50	1	–	–	–	–	1	–	
10	Eshkol Solomon‡	2022	2024	9	231	59*	33.00	1	–	–	–	–	5	–	
11	Elan Talker	2022	2026	17	36	22*	12.00	0	264	12	2/18	29.66	5	–	
12	Tomer Kahamker	2022	2024	6	6	4*	6.00	0	60	7	3/10	10.00	2	–	
13	Levi Kamarlekar	2022	2022	1	–	–	–	–	–	–	–	–	4	–	
14	Yogev Nagavkar	2022	2026	10	143	39	17.87	0	–	–	–	–	0	–	
15	Eyal Bhonkar	2024	2026	6	8	3	2.00	0	–	–	–	–	2	–	
16	Yarden Divekar	2024	2024	3	13	11	6.50	0	12	0	–	–	0	–	
17	Warna Narayana	2024	2026	9	92	32	10.22	0	81	1	1,084	107.00	1	–	
18	Prathapa Siriwardhana†	2024	2024	4	25	12	6.25	0	–	–	–	–	2	2	
19	Virendra Kumar	2024	2024	4	22	8*	11.00	0	60	4	2/20	18.25	0	–	
20	Aviel Warsulkar	2024	2024	2	2	2*	–	0	6	0	–	–	1	–	
21	Jitesh Bangera	2026	2026	4	32	21	8.00	0	–	–	–	–	3	–	
22	Roshan Bangera	2026	2026	3	0	0*	0.00	0	–	–	–	–	1	–	
23	Liron Dirmeik	2026	2026	3	28	23	14.00	0	–	–	–	–	1	–	
24	Gideon Hilkowitz	2026	2026	4	19	16	4.75	0	66	4	2/11	14.50	0	–	
25	Idan Varsulkar	2026	2026	4	18	11*	6.00	0	3	0	–	–	4	–	
26	Benjamin Lazarus	2026	2026	9	113	32	14.12	0	–	–	–	–	0	–	
27	Idan Levy	2026	2026	4	6	3*	–	0	61	6	2/15	12.33	0	–	
28	Joshua Marks	2026	2026	4	63	28	15.75	0	60	4	2/30	21.00	0	–	
29	Norman Sankar	2026	2026	2	5	4	2.50	0	–	–	–	–	0	–	
30	Ajay Khunti	2026	2026	5	22	13	7.33	0	72	3	2/37	37.00	2	–	
31	Suboda Mangoda	2026	2026	5	42	23	8.40	0	66	3	2/23	28.33	5	–	
32	Snir Massil	2026	2026	1	1	1	1.00	0	1	0	–	–	0	–	
