= Raja Adeel =

Indian-born cricketer (born 1987)

Personal information
- Full name: Raja Adeel Iqbal
- Born: 2 October 1987 (age 39); Ahmedabad, Gujarat, India

International information
- National sides: United Arab Emirates (2015); Spain (2019–)
- T20I debut (cap 16): 25 October 2019; Spain v Portugal
- Last T20I: 7 December 2025; Spain v Croatia

Career statistics
Competition	T20I
Matches	29
Runs scored	5
Batting average	1.25
100s/50s	0/0
Top score	2*
Balls bowled	590
Wickets	33
Bowling average	17.27
5 wickets in innings	0
10 wickets in match	0
Best bowling	3/8
Catches/stumpings	4/–
- Source: Cricinfo, 6 November 2022

Raja Adeel (born 2 October 1987) is an Indian-born cricketer, who plays for the Spanish cricket team. He made his first-class debut for the United Arab Emirates against Hong Kong in the 2015–17 ICC Intercontinental Cup tournament on 11 November 2015. In September 2019, he was named in Spain's Twenty20 International (T20I) squad for the 2019 Iberia Cup tournament. He made his T20I debut for Spain, against Portugal, on 25 October 2019.
