= Moises Henriques =

Portuguese-Australian international cricketer (born 1987)

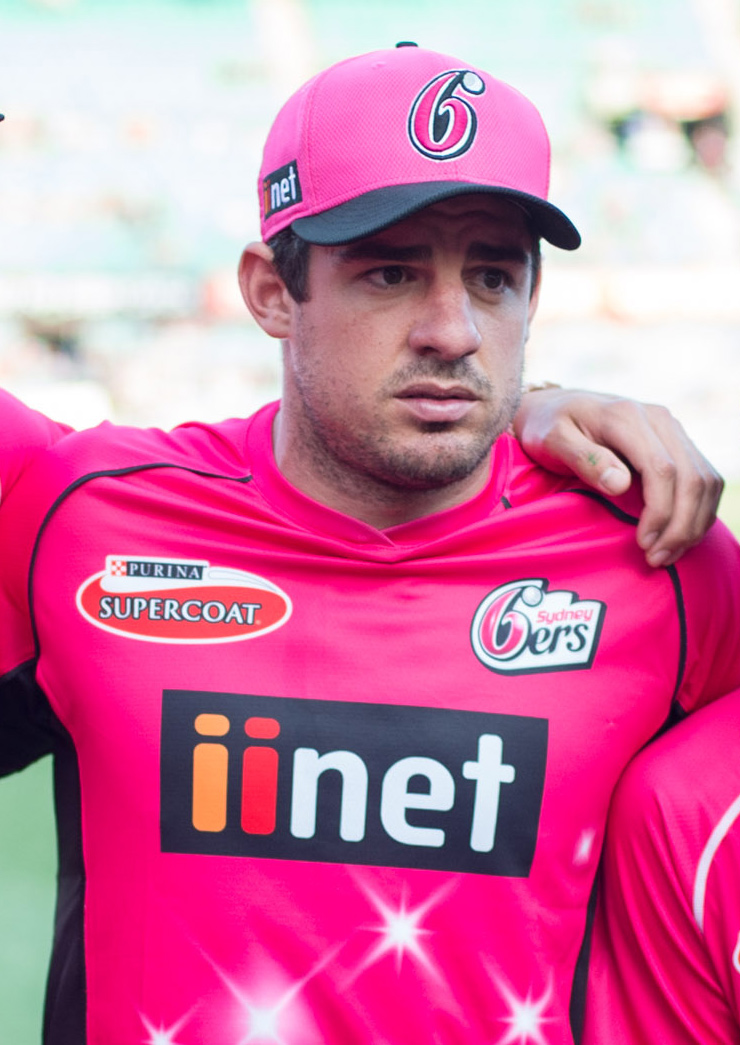
- Henriques with the Sydney Sixers in 2016

Personal information
- Full name: Moisés Constantino Henriques
- Born: 1 February 1987 (age 39); Funchal, Madeira, Portugal
- Nickname: Moey, Mozzie
- Height: 1.89 m (6 ft 2 in)
- Batting: Right-handed
- Bowling: Right-arm fast-medium
- Role: Batting all-rounder

International information
- National sides: Australia (2009–2021); Portugal (2026—present)
- Test debut (cap 432): 22 February 2013; Australia v India
- Last Test: 13 August 2016; Australia v Sri Lanka
- ODI debut (cap 179): 31 October 2009; Australia v India
- Last ODI: 26 July 2021; Australia v West Indies
- ODI shirt no.: 21
- T20I debut (cap 34/47): 15 February 2009; Australia v New Zealand
- Last T20I: 20 August 2026; Portugal v Czech Republic
- T20I shirt no.: 21

Domestic team information
- Years: Team
- 2006/07–2025/26: New South Wales
- 2009: Kolkata Knight Riders
- 2010: Delhi Daredevils
- 2011/12–2025/26: Sydney Sixers
- 2012: Glamorgan
- 2013: Royal Challengers Bangalore
- 2014–2017: Sunrisers Hyderabad
- 2015–2017: Surrey
- 2021: Punjab Kings
- 2023: Washington Freedom
- 2025: Nottinghamshire
- 2026: Glasgow Cosmic

Career statistics
Competition	Test	ODI	FC	LA
Matches	4	16	131	141
Runs scored	164	117	6,830	3,812
Batting average	23.42	9.0	34.84	34.34
100s/50s	0/2	0/0	13/31	4/18
Top score	81*	22	265	164*
Balls bowled	330	402	7,623	3,729
Wickets	2	8	127	86
Bowling average	82.0	43.37	30.75	37.97
5 wickets in innings	0	0	2	0
10 wickets in match	0	0	0	0
Best bowling	1/48	3/32	5/17	4/17
Catches/stumpings	1/–	6/–	56/–	51/–
- Source: ESPNcricinfo, 4 November 2025

Moisés Constantino Henriques (/ˈmoʊzɪz hɛnˈriːkɛs/ MO-ses hen-REE-kez; born 1 February 1987) is a Portuguese-Australian cricketer who is the current captain of the Portugal national cricket team, having also previously played for Australia. Henriques played the majority of his career as an Australian cricketer, where he played for New South Wales and the Sydney Sixers. He is the player to have played the most matches in Australian domestic cricket history, across the Sheffield Shield, One-Day Cup and Big Bash League. An all-rounder, he became the first cricketer born in Portugal to play for Australia in an international match.

== Under-19s career ==
At 16 years of age, Henriques was selected for the Australian U-19 cricket team's squad for the 2004 U-19 Cricket World Cup in Bangladesh, where he took 11 wickets at 19.27 and scored 95 runs at 19.00.

In September 2005, Henriques was named in Australia's U-19 squad to tour India for a One Day series against the Indian U-19 cricket team. Whilst Australia lost the series, Henriques was a stand out. He scored 132 runs at an average of 44.00 and claimed 8 wickets at 18.25.

Henriques was named captain of the Australian U-19 team for the 2006 U-19 Cricket World Cup in Sri Lanka, and performed to great acclaim as he led the Australians to a semi-final berth. He was a stand out player of the tournament, scoring 150 runs at 37.50 and finished as the World Cup's leading wicket-taker, claiming 16 wickets at 10.52 in 5 matches.

During his time in the Australian U-19 team, he played 17 matches, taking 35 wickets at 15.08 and scored 377 runs at an average of 31.41.

At the time he aged out of Under-19 cricket in 2006, Henriques was the leading wicket taker in the history of the Under-19 Cricket World Cup with 27 wickets.

== Domestic career ==
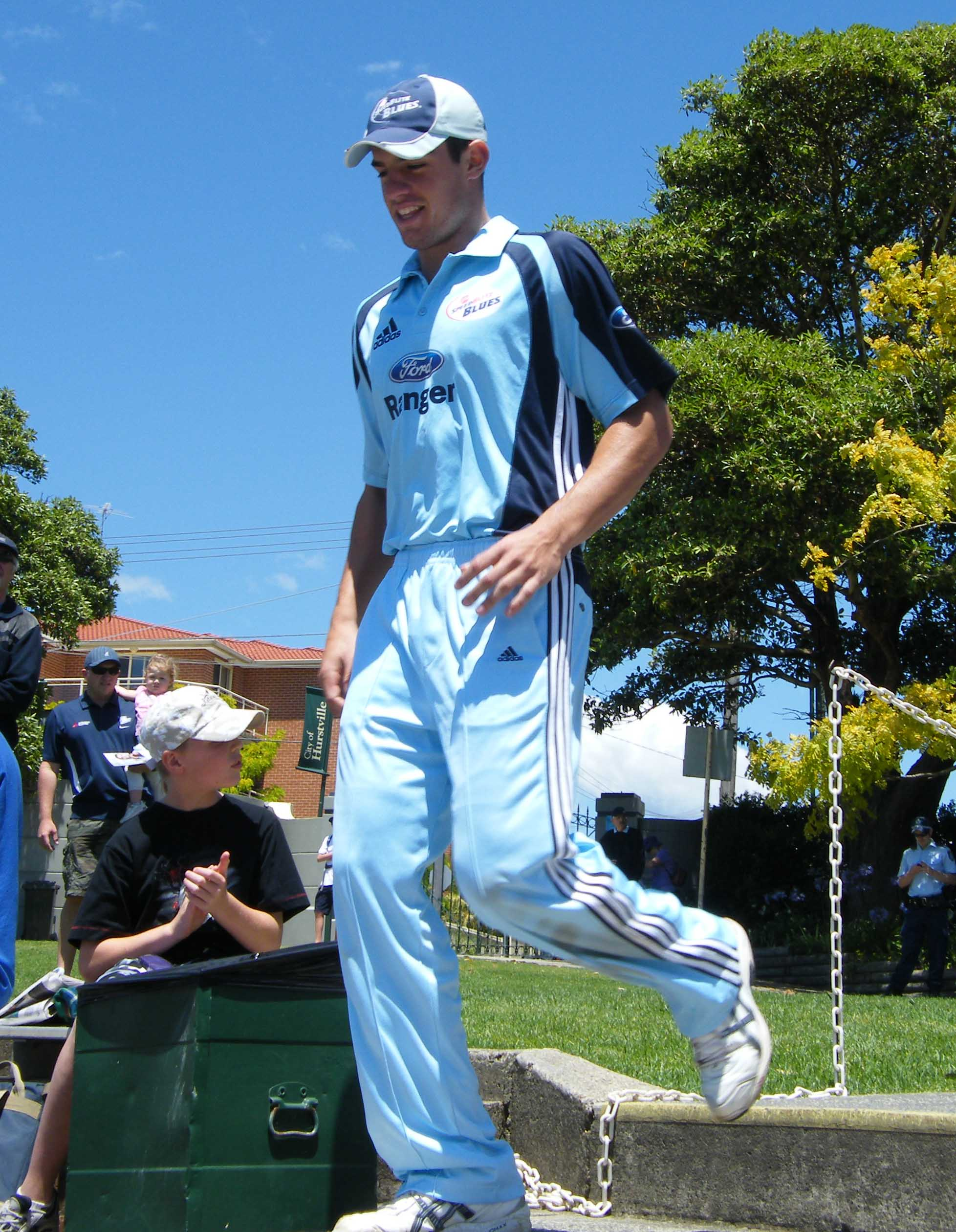
Henriques playing for New South Wales in 2008

On 2 January 2006, Henriques made his List A debut for New South Wales against Victoria. He bowled 8 overs for 46 runs in a narrow New South Wales victory. His appearance, at only 18 years of age, made him the youngest ever List A debutant for New South Wales. Six days later, Henriques made his Twenty20 debut, but did not bat or bowl in that match.

He made his first-class debut against South Australia at the Sydney Cricket Ground on 17 October 2006. Only a week after this match, Henriques took 5/17 against Queensland with fast bowling. In doing so, he became the youngest New South Wales cricketer to take 5 wickets in a first-class innings since Doug Walters However, due to injury, this was the last first-class game Henriques played for over a year.

He was signed by the Kolkata Knight Riders franchise for $300,000 to play in the Indian Premier League during the 2009 season. In 2010, he was traded to the Delhi Daredevils in exchange for Manoj Tiwary.

In 2012 he played part of the English season for Glamorgan. In September of the same year he scored his first first-class century, 161 not out off 229 balls against Tasmania at Bankstown.

In June 2015, while playing for Surrey in a NatWest T20 Blast game against Sussex Sharks at Arundel Castle, Henriques collided with teammate Rory Burns while attempting to take a catch. Both players were knocked unconscious from the collision and Henriques suffered a broken jaw. Ambulances and medical staff treated the players on-field before taking them both to hospital. The game was abandoned due to the injuries.

Henriques retired from first-class cricket at the end of the 2024–25 season, but continued to play one-day cricket for New South Wales for an extra season, before retiring from all domestic cricket. Henriques retired as the player to have played the most matches in Australian domestic cricket history, between first-class, List A and T20 cricket.

== T20 franchise career ==
Moises Henriques used to play for the Mumbai Indians in the IPL 4, but was ruled out of the squad because of adductor muscle injury. He was released from his contract with the Mumbai Indians team for IPL and was later picked up by Royal Challengers Bangalore in the player auction 2013 for the IPL-6. After some good time with Sunrisers Hyderabad from 2014 to 2017, in December 2018, he was bought by the Kings XI Punjab in the player auction for the 2019 Indian Premier League. But he couldn't feature in the IPL 2019 due to an ankle injury and was later released by Kings XI Punjab before IPL 2020.

In July 2019, he was selected to play for the Glasgow Giants in the inaugural edition of the Euro T20 Slam cricket tournament. However, the following month the tournament was cancelled. He was released by the Kings XI Punjab ahead of the 2020 IPL auction. In February 2021, Henriques was bought by the Punjab Kings in the IPL auction ahead of the 2021 Indian Premier League.

In the Big Bash League, Henriques captained Sydney Sixers to consecutive title victories in 2019–20 and 2020–21 seasons. He was also a part of the winning squad in the inaugural BBL final in 2011–12, where he scored 70 (41) in the final.

Henriques announced his retirement from the Big Bash after the 2025–26 season, after not being offered a new contract with the Sixers and deciding he didn't want to play for another team.

== International career ==
=== Australia ===
Henriques made his full international debut in a Twenty20 International against New Zealand in Sydney on 15 February 2009, but he was run out for only 1 run. In October, Henriques was called up, after injuries to Brett Lee and James Hopes, during Australia's tour of India. James Hopes had injured his hamstring. Ironically, soon after Henriques played in Hopes' place, he too injured his hamstring. In 2013, Henriques was selected in Australia's Test cricket team during the tour of India making his test debut and then scored his maiden half- century with 68 runs in the 1st innings of the 1st test backing it up with 81 not out in the 2nd innings. In 2017, he got back into the Australian squad for a trip to England and Wales for the ICC Champions Trophy which was eventually won by Pakistan. After a long three years gap from international cricket, Henriques returned to the national team for Australia's series against India in 2020. He also got a first test call up after four years against India in 2020.

=== Portugal ===
In 2026, Henriques switched nation to represent his birth country Portugal for the upcoming 2028 Men's T20 World Cup qualification. In August 2026, he was named as the captain of the Portuguese side for the 2026 Men's T20 World Cup Europe Sub-regional Qualifier C. On 19 August, 2026, Henriques hit his maiden T20I century, scoring 111 runs off 51 balls against the Czech Republic.

== Personal life ==
Moisés Henriques field at Endeavour High School in Caringbah.

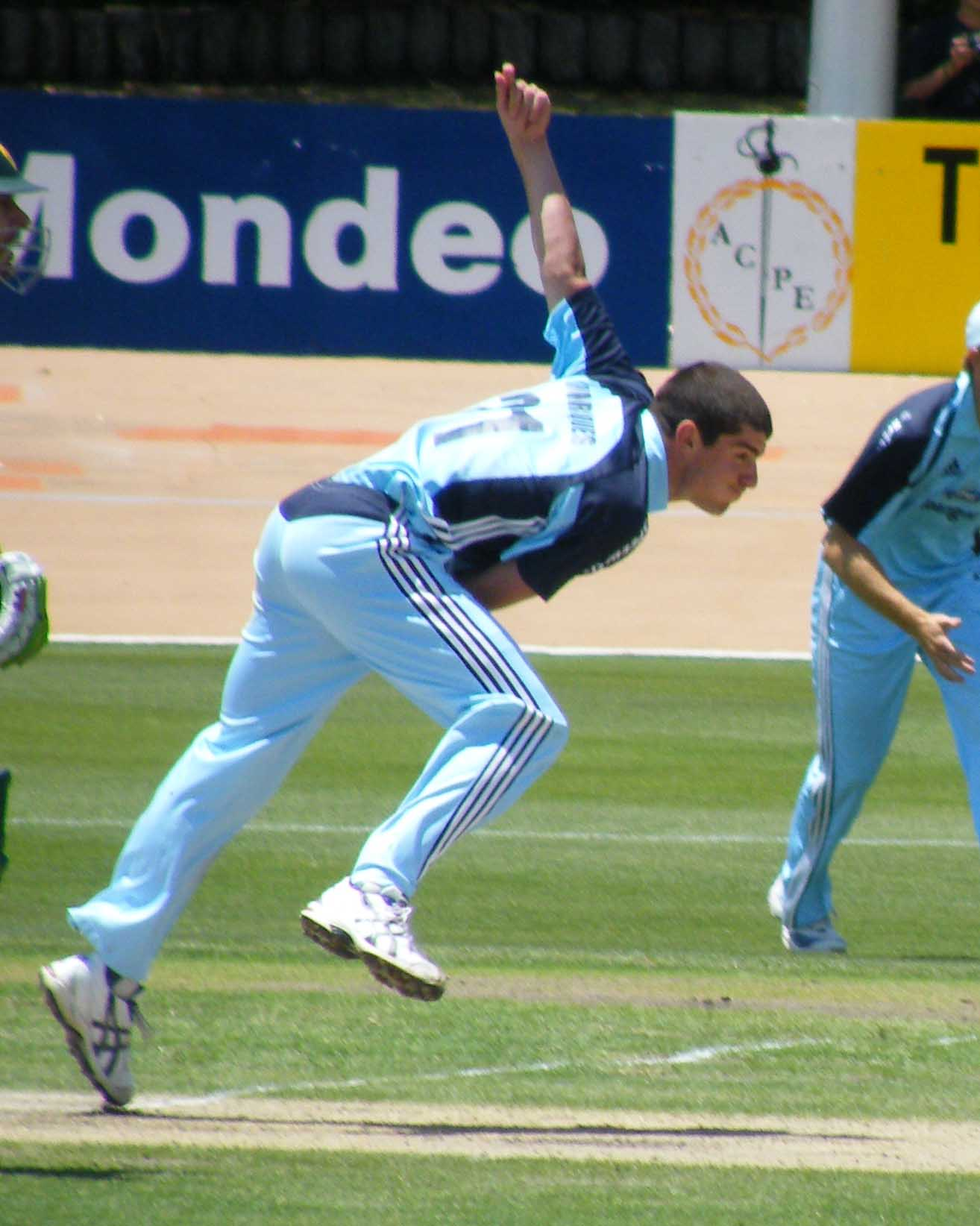
Henriques bowling for New South Wales in 2008

The son of former Portuguese professional footballer, Álvaro, Henriques was born in Funchal, Madeira, Portugal, before moving to Australia with his family at the age of one. He graduated from Endeavour Sports High School in 2004, yet while attending high school he represented New South Wales and Australia at Under 17 and Under 19 level. In 2004 he was the recipient of the first Rexona Australian Youth Cricket Scholarship, an initiative backed by Ricky Ponting.

In 2018, Henriques revealed he was suffering from depression and stepped down as captain of New South Wales.

Henriques married long-term partner, radio presenter Krista Thomas in 2018 and they had a son, Archie, born in 2020. They are currently separated.

Henriques is currently dating Nine News presenter Sophie Walsh.

== Playing style ==
A genuine all-rounder, Henriques states that he "couldn't choose" between batting and bowling as his preferred art. Despite this, some have commented that his bowling is slightly better than his batting. As a right-handed batsman, Henriques bats in the middle to lower order, and as a right-arm medium-fast bowler he generally opens the attack. His style has been compared to Australian Shane Watson, but Henriques looks to South African all-rounder Jacques Kallis as a source of inspiration.

== Career best performances ==
	Batting			
	Score	Fixture	Venue	Season
Test	81*	Australia v India	MA Chidambaram Stadium, Chennai	2012/13
ODI	22	India v Australia	Manuka Oval, Canberra	2020
T20I	111	Czech Republic v Portugal	Tikkurila Cricket Ground, Vantaa	2026
First-class	265	New South Wales v Queensland	SCG, Sydney	2016/17
List A	164*	New South Wales v Australia XI	Hurstville Oval, Sydney	2016/17
T20	111	Czech Republic v Portugal	Tikkurila Cricket Ground, Vantaa	2026
	Bowling (innings)			
	Figures	Fixture	Venue	Season
Test	1/48	Australia v India	MA Chidambaram Stadium, Chennai	2012/13
ODI	3/32	Australia v Sri Lanka	Bellerive Oval, Hobart	2012/13
T20I	2/35	Australia v England	Bellerive Oval, Hobart	2013/14
First-class	5/17	New South Wales v Queensland	The Gabba, Brisbane	2006/07
List A	4/17	New South Wales v Tasmania	Bankstown Oval, Sydney	2013/14
T20	3/11	New South Wales v Victoria	Arun Jaitley Stadium, Delhi	2009/10

== See also ==
- List of Test cricketers born in non-Test playing nations
