= Tariq Aziz (cricketer) =

Pakistani cricketer (born 1974)

Personal information
- Full name: Syed Tariq Aziz
- Born: 9 September 1974 (age 52)

International information
- National side: Portugal
- T20I debut (cap 10): 25 October 2019 v Spain
- Last T20I: 27 October 2019 v Gibraltar
- Source: Cricinfo, 27 October 2019

Tariq Aziz (born 9 September 1974) is a Pakistani cricketer who plays for the Portugal cricket team. He played five first-class matches for Hyderabad in the 1999/00 season.

In August 2018, he represented Portugal in Group A of the 2018–19 ICC T20 World Cup Europe Qualifier tournament. In Portugal's second match, against France, he was named the player of the match, for taking three wickets and scoring 48 runs. He finished as the leading run-scorer for the team in the qualifier, with 99 runs in four matches.

In October 2019, he was named in Portugal's Twenty20 International (T20I) squad for the 2019 Iberia Cup tournament. He made his T20I debut for Portugal, against Spain, on 25 October 2019.
