= Tauqeer Hussain =

Pakistani-Spanish cricketer (born 1981)

Personal information
- Born: 6 October 1981 (age 45); Faisalabad, Pakistan
- Batting: Right-handed
- Bowling: Right-arm fast medium

International information
- National side: Spain
- T20I debut (cap 8): 29 March 2019 v Malta
- Last T20I: 8 March 2020 v Germany

Career statistics
Competition	T20I	FC	LA
Matches	6	26	40
Runs scored	6	687	478
Batting average	6.00	19.62	16.48
100s/50s	0/0	1/3	0/1
Top score	3*	100	51
Balls bowled	87	1,877	1,448
Wickets	6	47	35
Bowling average	14.33	22.51	36.00
5 wickets in innings	0	2	1
10 wickets in match	0	0	0
Best bowling	2/12	6/65	5/35
Catches/stumpings	3/–	12/–	12/–
- Source: Cricinfo, 8 March 2020

Tauqeer Hussain (born 6 October 1981) is a Pakistani-Spanish cricketer who played domestic cricket for Faisalabad. He made his first-class debut for Faisalabad against Islamabad on November 03 2009. In March 2019, he was named in Spain's Twenty20 International (T20I) squad for the 2019 Spain Triangular T20I Series. He made his T20I debut for Spain, against Malta, on 29 March 2019.
