= European Cricket Championship =

Cricket Tournament in Europe

- Administrator: ICC Europe (2010–2017); European Cricket Council (1996–2010)
- Format: One Day Cricket; List A
- First edition: 2000
- Current champion: Germany
- Most successful: Ireland & Netherlands(3 titles each)

The European Cricket Championship was a national team cricket tournament for the European countries associated with the International Cricket Council. The tournament was played as a league system, where the teams were split into divisions. The competition was designed to encourage and develop the best players in countries where cricket was not a major sport and Europe's only Test cricket playing country at the time, England, did not enter a full-strength side. The games were often played as 50-over one-day cricket matches.

== History ==
The European Cricket Championships began in 1996 as a competition for seven European associate teams and an (English Cricket Board) ECB XI. The second installment, two years later, saw the two new associate members, France and Germany join them and the competition played over two divisions.

In 2000, places were given to the top finishers of the European Affiliates Championship and this continued over the following installments. Promotion and relegation between divisions was not introduced until 2004.

With the introduction of the ICC World Cricket League in 2006, the championship was revamped. The European Affiliates Championship was incorporated into the European Cricket Championships with the teams being split between Divisions Two, Three and Four according to their placement in the final competition. Additionally, the ECB XI was no longer included and only full national sides could take part. A fifth league was introduced in the 2009–10 season, containing some of the newest affiliate members of the European Cricket Council, but discontinued thereafter, along with Division 4. With the end of the World Cricket League in 2017, the European 50-over divisional structure was abolished altogether.

=== Participating teams ===
Legend

- 1st – Champions
- 2nd – Runners-up
- 3rd – Third place
- SF – Semi-finalist (no third-place playoff)
- * – Team was ineligible for tournament
- — Hosts

Team	(Denmark) 1996	(Netherlands) 1998	(Scotland) 2000	(Northern Ireland) 2002	(Netherlands) 2004	(Scotland) 2006	(Republic of Ireland) 2008	(Jersey) 2010	(Jersey) (Guernsey) 2011	(England) 2013	(Jersey) 2015	(Netherlands) 2017	Total
Austria	—	—	—	—	—	—	—	—	8th	6th	—	4th	4
Belgium	—	—	—	—	—	—	—	—	7th	12th	—	5th	4
Croatia	—	—	—	—	—	—	—	—	12th	—	—	—	1
Czech Republic	—	—	—	—	—	—	—	—	—	—	—	—	1
Denmark	3rd	2nd	6th	5th	4th	4th	3rd	5th	1st	2nd	2nd	*	11
England Board XI	4th	6th	2nd	1st	1st	—	—	—	—	*	*	*	6
Finland	—	—	—	—	—	—	—	—	—	—	—	—	1
France	—	8th	—	—	—	—	—	—	6th	5th	6th	6th	5
Germany	—	7th	—	—	—	—	—	—	10th	7th	—	1st	5
Gibraltar	6th	10th	—	—	—	—	—	—	9th	10th	—	—	4
Guernsey	—	—	—	—	—	—	—	—	4th	SF	4th	*	3
Hungary	—	—	—	—	—	—	—	—	—	—	—	—	1
Ireland	1st	4th	4th	3rd	5th	1st	1st	*	*	*	*	*	7
Ireland "A"	—	—	—	—	—	—	—	2nd	—	—	—	—	1
Isle of Man	—	—	—	—	—	—	—	—	—	9th	—	—	1
Israel	8th	9th	—	—	—	—	—	—	11th	—	—	—	3
Italy	7th	5th	5th	6th	—	5th	5th	6th	2nd	1st	3rd	*	11
Jersey	—	—	—	—	—	—	—	1st	3rd	SF	1st	*	4
Luxembourg	—	—	—	—	—	—	—	—	—	—	—	—	1
Netherlands	2nd	1st	1st	4th	2nd	3rd	4th	*	*	*	*	*	8
Netherlands "A"	—	—	—	—	—	—	—	4th	—	—	—	—	1
Norway	—	—	—	—	—	—	6th	—	5th	8th	5th	3rd	6
Portugal	—	—	—	—	—	—	—	—	—	—	—	—	1
Romania	—	—	—	—	—	—	—	—	—	—	—	—	1
Scotland	5th	3rd	3rd	2nd	3rd	2nd	2nd	*	*	*	*	*	7
Scotland "A"	—	—	—	—	—	—	—	3rd	—	—	—	—	1
Spain	—	—	—	—	—	—	—	—	—	—	—	—	1
Sweden	—	—	—	—	—	—	—	—	—	11th	—	2nd	3

== Tournaments ==
	Divisions	Host nation(s)	Final Standing	
1996	ECC Division One	Denmark	1. Ireland; 2. Netherlands; 3. Denmark; 4. England Board XI; 5. Scotland; 6. Gibraltar; 7. Italy; 8. Israel	The first tournament was played in Denmark in 1996. The participating teams were Denmark, Gibraltar, Netherlands, Ireland, Israel, Italy, Scotland and an England Board XI. The tournament was won by Ireland after beating the Netherlands in the final.
1998	ECC Division One	Netherlands	1. Netherlands; 2. Denmark; 3. Scotland; 4. Ireland; 5. Italy; 6. England Board XI; 7. Germany; 8. France; 9. Israel; 10. Gibraltar	1998 tournament was held in Netherlands. The participating teams were Denmark, Gibraltar, Netherlands, Ireland, Israel, Italy, Scotland, Germany, France and an England Board XI. The tournament was won by Netherlands after beating the Denmark in the final. In one of the biggest shocks in cricket history, Italy beat England in the promotion/relegation playoff.
2000	ECC Division One	Scotland	1. Netherlands; 2. England Board XI; 3. Scotland; 4. Ireland; 5. Italy; 6. Denmark	The top 6 teams from the previous tournament Formed ECC Division 1 The tournament was played in Scotland and was again won by the Netherlands against England Board XI.
2000	ECC Division Two	Scotland	1. Gibraltar; 2. Germany; 3. France; 4. Portugal; 5. Israel; 6. Greece	The Bottom 4 teams from the previous tournament Formed ECC Division 2 joined by Greece and Portugal. The tournament was played in Scotland. ECC Division 2 was won by Gibraltar against Germany.
2002	ECC Division One	Ireland	1. England Board XI; 2. Scotland; 3. Ireland; 4. Netherlands; 5. Denmark; 6. Italy	2002 ECC tournament was held in Northern Ireland, It was won by the ECB XI against Scotland.: Italy finished last was relegated to 2004 ECC Division Two
2002	ECC Division Two	Ireland	1. Gibraltar; 2. Germany; 3. Portugal; 4. Israel; 5. France; 6. Austria	2002 ECC tournament was held in Northern Ireland, with Austria replacing Greece from the previous tournament. The ECC Division Two was again won by Gibraltar against Germany.
2004	ECC Division One	Netherlands	1. England Board XI; 2. Ireland; 3. Netherlands; 4. Scotland; 5. Denmark	2004 ECC Division One, played in the Netherlands, was again won by the ECB XI against Ireland.
2004	ECC Division Two	Belgium	1. Italy; 2. France; 3. Germany; 4. Norway; 5. Gibraltar; 6. Israel	2004 ECC Division Two, played in Belgium, was again won by the Italy against France. Austria and Portugal did not compete this year, although Norway made their debut in Division Two.
2006	ECC Division One	Scotland	1. Ireland; 2. Scotland; 3. Netherlands; 4. Denmark; 5. Italy	The European Division One Championships was held from 4–9 August in Scotland. Five teams participated in a round robin tournament, the games being held in Glasgow and Ayr. The games between Scotland, Ireland and the Netherlands had full ODI status. The tournament was won by Ireland, who had also won a 'clean sweep' of European Championship at all age levels.: The top three teams qualified for 2007 WCL Division One; 4th place team for qualified 2007 WCL Division Two; 5th place team for qualified 2007 WCL Division Three.
2006	ECC Division Two	Scotland	1. Norway; 2. Jersey; 3. Germany; 4. Gibraltar; 5. Guernsey; 6. France; 7. Israel; 8. Greece	The European Division Two Championships was held from 4–9 August in Scotland, together with Division One. The winner would be promoted to the next installment of Division One in 2008. Division Two was primarily played in Glasgow, with one game being played at RAF Lossiemouth for security reasons. Italy were absent, having been promoted to Division One. Greece made their return to Division Two after a six-year absence, whilst the tournament saw the international debuts of Guernsey and Jersey. It was won by Norway, Norway promoted to 2008 Division One.; The win also granted them entry into 2008 WCL Division Five alongside runners-up Jersey and 3rd place Germany.; Israel relegated to playoff with 2007 ECC Division Three winner.; Greece came in last place and were relegated later was stripped of their first round points due to fielding ineligible players.
2006	ECC Division Four	Belgium	1. Finland; 2. Cyprus; 3. Luxembourg; 4. Slovenia	The European Division Four Championship was played in Belgium, and featured the debut of Cyprus who played Finland, Luxembourg and Slovenia. It was won by Finland.: Finland & Cyprus gained promotion to 2007 Division Three.
2007	ECC Division Three	Belgium	1. Croatia; 2. Spain; 3. Isle of Man; 4. Malta; 5. Belgium; 6. Portugal; 7. Cyprus; 8. Finland	The European Division Three Championships was held in Belgium and it featured 8 teams viz. Croatia, Spain, Malta, Isle of Man, Belgium and Portugal. Finland and Cyprus qualified through 2006 ECC Division four.In the final Croatia beat Spain by four runs.: Croatia Qualified 2007 ECC division two Playoff; Cyprus and Finland relegated to 2009 ECC Division Four.
2007	2007 ECC division two Playoff	Israel	Croatia beatIsrael by 5 runs	On 18 November 2007 a play-off between Croatia and Israel took place in Tel Aviv, Croatia won the match by five runs: Croatia promoted to Division Two.
2008	ECC Division One	Ireland	1. Ireland; 2. Scotland; 3. Denmark; 4. Netherlands; 5. Italy; 6. Norway	The European Championship Division 1 was held from 25 to 31 July in Ireland. Six teams participated in a round robin tournament, the games being played in Dublin. The tournament was won by Ireland.: Norway relegated to playoff with 2008 ECC Division Two winner.
2008	ECC Division Two	Guernsey	1. Jersey; 2. Guernsey; 3. Gibraltar; 4. France; 5. Germany; 6. Croatia	The European Championship Division 2 was held from 18 to 23 August in Guernsey. Six teams participated in a round robin tournament, the games being played at the King George V, Port Soif and College Field grounds. The tournament was won by Jersey: Jersey promoted to a play off, for a chance of promotion to Division One.; Croatia relegated to playoff with 2009 ECC Division Three winner.
2008	2008 ECC division one Playoff	Guernsey	Norway v Jersey – Not played	Play-off system scrapped by ICC Europe.: Jersey promoted to 2010 ECC Division One .; Norway relegated to 2010 ECC Division Two.
2009	ECC Division Three	Spain	1. Israel; 2. Isle of Man; 3. Spain; 4. Belgium; 5. Portugal; 6. Malta	The 2009 European Championship Division Three was held in La Manga, Spain from 31 August to 5 September.: Israel qualified 2009 ECC division two Playoffs; Malta were relegated to 2011 Division Four.
2009	2009 ECC division two Playoff	Spain	Croatia Lost to Israel	Croatia Lost the match to Israel: Israel promoted to Division Two.
2009	ECC Division Five	Greece	1. Greece; 2. Sweden; 3. Czech Republic; 4. Bulgaria; 5. Estonia; 6. Turkey	The 2009 European Championship Division Five was held in Corfu, Greece from 7 to 12 September. Greece finished top gaining promotion to Division 4. The tournament also marked Turkey's debut in international cricket. Although they finished last they did gain their first victory in international cricket over Bulgaria.
2009	ECC Division Four	Cyprus	1. Cyprus; 2. Switzerland; 3. Austria; 4. Luxembourg; 5. Finland; 6. Slovenia	The 2009 European Championship Division Four was held in Limassol, Cyprus from 14 to 19 September. The winners were Cyprus on net run rate as both Switzerland and Austria, who had returned to the competition after a number of years absence, had equal points at the end of the competition.: Slovenia were relegated to 2011 Division Five after losing all of their games.
2010	2010 ECC Division One	Jersey	1. Jersey; 2. Ireland A 3. Scotland A 4. Netherlands A 5. Denmark; 6. Italy	The 2010 European Championship Division One was held in Jersey from 13 to 19 July. The ECC decided that the division would be made up of the six highest placed European teams currently embedded in the World Cricket League structure. The three nations with ODI status sent their second XIs to the tournament. Hosts Jersey were the champions, winning all their games.
2010	2010 ECC Division Two	Guernsey	1. Guernsey; 2. Germany; 3. France; 4. Norway; 5. Israel; 6. Gibraltar	The 2010 European Championship Division Two was held in Guernsey from 13 to 19 July. The ECC decided that the division would be made up of the three lowest placed teams currently embedded in the World Cricket League structure and the three next placed teams based on recent regional events. The highest placed of these latter teams at the end of the tournament would gain qualification for 2010 WCL Division Eight.: Guernsey were the champions after winning all the games; Germany qualified for the Division Eight tournament. Although their net run rate was lower than that of France they earn qualification as they had won their match against the French side.; Norway finished above Israel for the same reason.
2011	2011 ECC Division Three	Austria & Slovenia	1. Sweden; 2. Estonia; 3. Slovenia; 4. Czech Republic; 5. Turkey; 6. Bulgaria	The 2011 ICC European Twenty20 Championship Division Three is a cricket tournament that took place between 11 and 14 May 2011.: Sweden were the champions, promoted to 2011 ECC Division Two.
2011	2011 ECC Division Two	Belgium and Netherlands	1. Belgium; 2. Austria; 3. Isle of Man; 4. Portugal; 5. Spain; 6. Greece; 7. Finland; 8. Luxembourg; 9. Malta; 10. Cyprus; 11. Sweden	The 2011 ICC European Twenty20 Championship Division Two is a cricket tournament that took place between 20 and 25 June 2011.: Belgium and Austria Promoted to 2011 ICC European T20 Championship Division One.; Isle of Man, Portugal, Spain, Greece, Finland, Luxembourg, Malta, Cyprus, Sweden Remain in 2012 ICC European T20 Championship Division Two
2011	2011 ECC Division One	Jersey and Guernsey	1. Denmark; 2. Italy; 3. Jersey; 4. Guernsey; 5. Norway; 6. France; 7. Belgium; 8. Austria; 9. Gibraltar; 10. Germany; 11. Israel; 12. Croatia	The 2011 ICC European Twenty20 Championship Division One was a cricket tournament that took place between 19 and 24 July 2011.: Denmark and Italy were Promoted to 2012 ICC World Twenty20 Qualifier; Jersey, Guernsey, Norway, France, Belgium, Austria, Gibraltar, Germany remained in 2013 ICC European T20 Championship Division One.; Israel and Croatia were relegated to 2013 European T20 Championship Division Two
2012	2012 ECC Division Three	Estonia	1. Estonia; 2. Slovenia; 3. Bulgaria	The 2012 ICC European Twenty20 Championship Division Three is a cricket tournament that took place between 14 and 16 June 2012.: Estonia qualified for 2012 ICC European T20 Championship Division Two.
2012	2012 ECC Division Two	Greece	1. Isle of Man; 2. Sweden; 3. Spain; 4. Israel; 5. Greece; 6. Finland; 7. Portugal; 8. Estonia; 9. Luxembourg; 10. Croatia; 11. Cyprus; 12. Malta	The 2012 ICC European Twenty20 Championship Division Two is a cricket tournament that took place between 3–8 September 2012: Isle of Man and Sweden were promoted to 2013 Europe Division One; Portugal, Spain, Greece, Finland, Luxembourg, Israel, Cyprus, Estonia, Croatia Remain in 2015 Europe Division Two; Malta relegated to 2015 Europe Division Three
2013	2013 ECC Division One	England	1. Italy; 2. Denmark; 3. Guernsey; 4. Jersey; 5. France; 6. Austria; 7. Germany; 8. Norway; 9. Isle of Man; 10. Gibraltar; 11. Sweden; 12. Belgium	The 2013 ICC European Twenty 20 Championship Division One was a cricket tournament that took place from 8–14 July 2013.It formed part of the European Cricket Championship. England hosted the event.: Italy and Denmark promoted to 2013 ICC World Twenty20 Qualifier and qualify for 2015 ICC Europe Division One; Guernsey, Jersey and France Qualify for 2015 ICC Europe Division One.; Austria, Germany, Norway, Isle of Man and Gibraltar were Relegated to 2014 ICC Europe Division Two.; Sweden and Belgium were relegated to 2014 ICC Europe Division Three
2014	2014 ECC Division Three	Spain	1. Belgium; 2. Spain; 3. Israel; 4. Greece; 5. Finland	The 2014 ICC European Cricket Championship Division Three was a cricket tournament that took place from 25 April – 3 May 2014.It formed part of the European Cricket Championship. La manga, Spain hosted the event.: Belgium promoted 2014 ICC Europe Division Two; Sweden did not participated in the event
2014	2014 ECC Division Two	England	1. Norway; 2. Belgium; 3. Austria; 4. Gibraltar; 5. Isle of Man; 6. Germany	The 2014 ICC Europe Division Two was an international 20-over cricket tournament hosted in Essex, England, from 23 to 26 June 2014.: Norway promoted 2015 ICC Europe Division One
2015	2015 ECC Division One	Jersey	1. Jersey; 2. Denmark; 3. Italy; 4. Guernsey; 5. Norway; 6. France	The 2015 ICC Europe Division One was a cricket tournament held in Jersey from 9–13 May 2015. The tournament was organised by ICC Europe, and featured the top six associate members in that region – Denmark, France, Guernsey, Italy, Jersey, and Norway: The host, Jersey, won the tournament on net run rate from Denmark, and Qualified for 2015 ICC World Twenty20 Qualifier; ICC Europe World Cricket League Division Six Qualifier: Along with the Twenty20 tournament, two teams, France and Norway played each other in one-off 50-over match for a qualification spot in 2015 ICC World Cricket League Division Six.; Norway beat France by 97 runs.
2016	2016 ECC Division Two	Sweden	1. Germany; 2. Sweden; 3. Spain; 4. Israel; 5. Isle of Man; 6. Gibraltar	The 2016 ICC World Cricket League Europe Division Two was an international 20-over cricket tournament played in Stockholm, Sweden, from 17 to 20 August 2016. It was the first official (ICC-approved) international cricket tournament to be played in Sweden: Germany and Sweden qualified for 2017 ICC World Cricket League Europe Region Division One.
2017	2017 ECC Division One	Netherlands	1. Germany; 2. Sweden; 3. Norway; 4. Austria; 5. Belgium; 6. France	The 2017 ICC World Cricket League Europe Region Division One was an international 50-over cricket tournament played in the Netherlands.: Germany qualified for 2017 ICC World Cricket League Division Five.

== 2006-07 European Cricket Championship ==
From 2006, the European Cricket Council expanded the tournament to include five divisions of between 4 and 8 teams. By 2009, all five divisions contained six teams.

=== Division One ===
The European Division One Championships was held from 4–9 August in Scotland. Five teams participated in a round robin tournament, the games being held in Glasgow and Ayr. The games between Scotland, Ireland and the Netherlands had full ODI status. The tournament was won by Ireland, who had also won a 'clean sweep' of European Championship at all age levels.

The top three teams qualified for 2007 WCL Division One, the 4th place for 2007 WCL Division Two and the 5th place for 2007 WCL Division Three.

Place	Team	Played	Wins	Tied	NR	Loss	PTS	NRR
1	Ireland	4	3	0	1	0	7	+2.416
2	Scotland	4	3	0	0	1	6	+0.026
3	Netherlands	4	2	0	1	1	5	+1.177
4	Denmark	4	1	0	0	3	2	−0.275
5	Italy	4	0	0	0	4	0	−2.716

Fixtures

1st match

4 August 2006
Scorecard

Ireland; 209 (45.2 overs)	v	Denmark; 110 (32.4 overs)
William Porterfield 42 (64); Zishan Shah 3/45 (8.1 overs)		Carsten Pedersen 65* (85); Dave Langford-Smith 3/27 (8 overs)

Ireland won by 99 runs
Glasgow
Umpires: John Holder (Eng) and Richard Smith (Ger)
Player of the match: Carsten Pedersen (Den)

- Denmark won the toss and elected to field.

2nd match

4 August 2006
Scorecard

Netherlands; 317/7 (50 overs)	v	Italy; 177 (47 overs)
Daan van Bunge 123 (84); Alauddin 3/59 (10 overs)		Nicola Puccio 29 (59); Ryan ten Doeschate 5/25 (9 overs)

Netherlands won by 140 runs
Glasgow
Umpires: Charlie McElwee (Ire) and Mark Hawthorne (Ire)
Player of the match: Ryan ten Doeschate (Ned)

- Netherlands won the toss and elected to bat.

3rd match (ODI)

5 August 2006
Scorecard

Ireland; 240/8 (50 overs)	v	Scotland; 155 (41.3 overs)
Eoin Morgan 99 (134); Craig Wright 3/32 (10 overs)		Paul Hoffmann 31 (14); Dave Langford-Smith 3/32 (10 overs)

Ireland won by 85 runs
Ayr
Umpires: Paul Baldwin (Ger) and Tony Hill (NZ)
Player of the match: Eoin Morgan (Ire)

- Scotland won the toss and elected to field.
- Eoin Morgan, Niall O'Brien, William Porterfield (Ire), Craig Wright, Navdeep Poonia and Omer Hussain (Sco) all made their ODI debut.

4th match

6 August 2006
Scorecard

Denmark; 208/8 (39 overs)	v	Italy; 153 (34.5 overs)
Carsten Pedersen 59 (65); Samantha Ketipe 3/44 (8 overs)		Samantha Ketipe 28 (56); Thomas Hansen 3/23 (6 overs)

Denmark won by 55 runs
Glasgow
Umpires: Sanjeev Kad (Fin) and Steve Tovey (Ned)
Player of the match: Carsten Pedersen (Den)

- Scotland won the toss and elected to field.
- Match reduced to 39 overs per side.

5th match (ODI)

6 August 2006
Scorecard

Netherlands; 137/8 (20 overs)	v	Scotland; 138/6 (19.5 overs)
Daan van Bunge 32 (21); Ryan Watson 3/18 (3 overs)		Ryan Watson 47 (43); Billy Stelling 2/15 (4 overs)

Scotland won by 4 wickets
Ayr
Umpires: Paul Baldwin (Ger) and Tony Hill (NZ)
Player of the match: Ryan Watson (Sco)

- Netherlands won the toss and elected to bat.
- Match reduced to 20 overs
- Tom de Grooth (Ned) and Fraser Watts (Sco) made their ODI debut.

6th match

7 August 2006
Scorecard

Italy; 79 (32.4 overs)	v	Ireland; 80/3 (12.2 overs)
Hemantha Jayasena 14 (18); John Mooney 3/5 (9 overs)		Niall O'Brien 28* (35); Hemantha Jayasena 1/16 (2 overs)

Ireland won by 7 wickets
Glasgow
Umpires: Brian Papworth (Sco) and Niels Bagh (Den)
Player of the match: Niall O'Brien (Ire)

- Italy won the toss and elected to bat.

7th match (ODI)

7 August 2006
Scorecard

Ireland; 274 (50 overs)	v	Netherlands; 125/5 (19 overs)
Andre Botha 56 (71); Peter Borren 3/54 (7 overs)		Ryan ten Doeschate 56* (41); Dave Langford-Smith 3/41 (7 overs)

No Result
Ayr
Umpires: Paul Baldwin (Ger) and Tony Hill (NZ)

- Ireland won the toss and elected to bat.
- Netherlands was set a revised target of 272 in 48 overs

8th match

8 August 2006
Scorecard

Scotland; 298/4 (50 overs)	v	Denmark; 251/8 (50 overs)
Fraser Watts 171 (154); Johan Malcolm 2/31 (10 overs)		Johan Malcolm 54 (48); John Blain 4/43 (8 overs)

Scotland won by 47 runs
Glasgow
Umpires: John Holder (Eng) and Steve Tovey (Ned)
Player of the match: Fraser Watts (Sco)

- Scotland won the toss and elected to bat.

9th match

9 August 2006
Scorecard

Denmark; 238/8 (50 overs)	v	Netherlands; 240/6 (49.5 overs)
Carsten Pedersen 46 (46); Pieter Seelaar 2/42 (10 overs)		Eric Szwarczynski 45 (54); Johan Malcolm 3/39 (10 overs)

Scotland won by 47 runs
Glasgow
Umpires: John Holder (Eng) and Mark Hawthorne (Ire)
Player of the match: Fraser Watts (Sco)

- Netherlands won the toss and elected to field.

10th match

9 August 2006
Scorecard

Italy; 178 (48.1 overs)	v	Scotland; 179/0 (33.2 overs)
Hemantha Jayasena 69 (121); Dewald Nel 3/23 (9.1 overs)		Neil MacRae 88* (118)

Scotland won by 10 wickets
Glasgow
Umpires: Niels Bagh (Den) and Richard Smith (Ger)

- Italy won the toss and elected to bat.

=== Division Two ===
The European Division Two Championships was held from 4–9 August in Scotland, together with Division One. The winner would be promoted to the next installment of Division One in 2008.

Division Two was primarily played in Glasgow, with one game being played at RAF Lossiemouth for security reasons. Italy were absent, having been promoted to Division One. Greece made their return to Division Two after a six-year absence, whilst the tournament saw the international debuts of Guernsey and Jersey. It was won by Norway, who were promoted to 2008 Division One. The win also granted them entry into 2008 WCL Division Five alongside runners-up Jersey and 3rd place Germany. Greece came in last place and were relegated to 2007 Division Three after being stripped of their first round points due to fielding ineligible players. The tournament was met by protests due to the involvement of the Israeli team.

==== Group A ====
Place	Team	Wins	Tied	NR	Loss	PTS	NRR
1	Germany	1	0	0	2	2	0.92
2	Gibraltar	1	0	0	2	2	0.66
3	Guernsey	1	0	0	2	2	0.53
4	Greece	3	0	0	0	0	-

Greece was disqualified for ineligibility of players.

==== Group B ====
Place	Team	Wins	Tied	NR	Loss	PTS	NRR
1	Norway	2	0	0	1	4	1.19
2	Jersey	1	0	1	1	3	1.71
3	Israel	1	0	1	1	3	0.75
4	France	1	0	0	2	2	0.78

=== Division Four ===
This tournament was played in Belgium, and featured the debut of Cyprus who played Finland, Luxembourg and Slovenia. It was won by Finland who gained promotion to 2007 Division Three, as did runners-up Cyprus.

Place	Team	Wins	Tied	NR	Loss	PTS	NRR
1	Finland	2	0	0	1	4	0.92
2	Cyprus	2	0	0	1	4	−0.20
3	Luxembourg	1	0	0	2	2	0.16
4	Slovenia	1	0	0	2	2	−0.77

=== 2007 ===
==== Division Three ====
===== Group A =====
Place	Team	Wins	Tied	NR	Loss	PTS	NRR
1	Croatia	3	0	0	0	6	2.017
2	Spain	1	0	0	1	3	1.161
3	Finland	1	0	0	2	2	0.687
4	Portugal	0	0	0	2	1	0.523

===== Group B =====
Place	Team	Wins	Tied	NR	Loss	PTS	NRR
1	Isle of Man	2	0	0	0	5	1.450
2	Malta	1	0	0	1	3	1.288
3	Cyprus	1	0	0	1	3	0.800
4	Belgium	0	0	0	2	1	0.785

In the semi-finals Croatia beat Malta by nine wickets and Spain beat the Isle of Man on fewer wickets lost when scores were tied. In the final Croatia beat Spain by four runs. In the 5th–8th place play-offs, Belgium and Portugal were victorious meaning that Cyprus and Finland would be relegated to 2009 Division Three.

==== Play off ====
On 18 November 2007 a play-off between Croatia and Israel took place in Tel Aviv, Croatia won the match by five runs to win promotion to Division Two.

== 2008-09 European Cricket Championship ==
=== Division One ===
The European Championship Division 1 was held from 25 to 31 July in Ireland. Six teams participated in a round robin tournament, the games being played in Dublin. The tournament was won by Ireland.

Place	Team	Wins	Loss	Tied	NR	PTS	NRR
1	Ireland	5	0	0	0	10	1.441
2	Scotland	4	1	0	0	8	2.216
3	Denmark	2	2	0	1	5	0.072
4	Netherlands	1	3	0	1	3	0.909
5	Italy	1	3	0	1	3	−0.682
6	Norway	0	4	0	1	1	−4.756

Fixtures

1st match

25 July 2008
Scorecard

Denmark; 224/8 (50 overs)	v	Scotland; 203/4 (38.3 overs)
Carsten Pedersen 72 (103); Gordon Drummond 2/43 (10 overs)		Qasim Sheikh 80* (122); Michael Pedersen 2/27 (9 overs)

Scotland won by 6 wickets (DLS method)
The Village, Dublin
Umpires: Paul Baldwin (Eng) and Richard Smith (Ger)

- Denmark won the toss and elected to bat.
- Scotland was set a revised target of 203 in 44 overs.

2nd match

25 July 2008
Scorecard

Norway; 119 (43.1 overs)	v	Ireland; 120/2 (22.5 overs)
Sameer Sachdev 38 (110); Gary Kidd 4/25 (9 overs)		Gary Wilson 47* (65); Zeeshan Ali 1/28 (4 overs)

Ireland won by 8 wickets
Dublin
Umpires: Niels Bagh (Den) and Steve Tovey (Ned)

- Norway won the toss and elected to bat.

3rd match

25 July 2008
Scorecard

Italy; 181 (49.4 overs)	v	Netherlands; 173 (43.2 overs)
Joe Scuderi 84* (122); Edgar Schiferli 3/24 (10 overs)		Tom de Grooth 51 (85); Alauddin 3/30 (10 overs)

Italy won by 8 runs
Dublin
Umpires: Ian Ramage (Sco) and Trevor Magee (Ire)

- Netherlands won the toss and elected to field.

4th match

26 July 2008
Scorecard

Denmark; 179/9 (50 overs)	v	Ireland; 182/5 (45.4 overs)
Freddie Klokker 85 (126); Kyle McCallan 3/32 (10 overs)		William Porterfield 58 (111); Lars Hedegaard 2/25 (10 overs)

Ireland won by 5 wickets
Dublin
Umpires: Sanjeev Kad (Fin) and Ian Ramage (Sco)

- Denmark won the toss and elected to bat.

5th match (ODI)

26 July 2008
Scorecard

Italy; 125 (44.4 overs)	v	Scotland; 126/4 (29 overs)
Alessandro Bonora 28 (59); Majid Haq 3/22 (10 overs)		Colin Smith 33 (28); Andy Northcote 2/33 (7 overs)

Scotland won by 4 wickets
Dublin
Umpires: Niels Bagh (Den) and Charlie McElwee (Ire)

- Italy won the toss and elected to bat.

6th match

26 July 2008
Scorecard

Netherlands; 474/8 (50 overs)	v	Norway; 104 (24.1 overs)
Darron Reekers 196 (117); Zeeshan Ali 4/87 (9 overs)		Shahid Ahmed 29 (20); Edgar Schiferli 5/52 (9 overs)

Netherlands won by 370 runs
Dublin
Umpires: Brian Papworth (Sco) and Niels Bagh (Den)

- Netherlands won the toss and elected to bat.

=== Division Two ===
The European Championship Division 2 was held from 18 to 23 August in Guernsey. Six teams participated in a round robin tournament, the games being played at the King George V, Port Soif and College Field grounds. The tournament was won by Jersey who will compete in a play off later in the year for a chance of promotion to Division One. By finishing in 2nd and 3rd place, Guernsey and Gibraltar also secured themselves a place in 2009 WCL Division Seven.

Place	Team	Wins	Tied	NR	Loss	PTS	NRR
1	Jersey	5	0	0	0	10	1.28
2	Guernsey	4	0	0	1	8	1.56
3	Gibraltar	3	0	0	2	6	−0.49
4	France	2	0	0	3	4	−0.33
5	Germany	1	0	0	4	2	−0.59
6	Croatia	0	0	0	5	0	−1.03

=== 2009 ===
==== Division Three ====
The 2009 European Championship Division Three was held in La Manga, Spain from 31 August to 5 September. Israel finished top and gained promotion to 2010 Division Two after beating Croatia in a play-off. Malta were relegated to 2011 Division Four.

Place	Team	Wins	Tied	NR	Loss	PTS	NRR
1	Israel	4	0	0	1	8	1.11
2	Isle of Man	4	0	0	1	8	0.98
3	Spain	3	0	0	2	6	0.56
4	Belgium	2	0	0	3	4	−0.06
5	Portugal	1	0	0	4	2	−1.04
6	Malta	1	0	0	4	2	−1.73

==== Division Four ====
The 2009 European Championship Division Four was held in Limassol, Cyprus from 14 to 19 September. The winners were Cyprus on net run rate as both Switzerland and Austria, who had returned to the competition after a number of years absence, had equal points at the end of the competition. Slovenia were relegated to 2011 Division Five after losing all of their games.

Place	Team	Wins	Tied	NR	Loss	PTS	NRR
1	Cyprus	4	0	0	1	8	2.26
2	Switzerland	4	0	0	1	8	2.11
3	Austria	4	0	0	1	8	1.12
4	Luxembourg	2	0	0	3	4	−0.74
5	Finland	1	0	0	4	2	−0.52
6	Slovenia	0	0	0	5	0	−4.14

==== Division Five ====
The 2009 European Championship Division Five was held in Corfu, Greece from 7 to 12 September. Greece finished top gaining promotion to Division 4. The tournament also marked Turkey's debut in international cricket. Although they finished last they did gain their first victory in international cricket over Bulgaria.

Place	Team	Wins	Tied	NR	Loss	PTS	NRR
1	Greece	5	0	0	0	10	2.61
2	Sweden	4	0	0	1	8	2.43
3	Czech Republic	3	0	0	2	6	−0.70
4	Bulgaria	1	0	0	4	2	−1.35
5	Estonia	1	0	0	4	2	−1.48
6	Turkey	1	0	0	4	2	−1.60

=== 2010 ===
==== Division One ====
The 2010 European Championship Division One was held in Jersey from 13 to 19 July. The ECC decided that the division would be made up of the six highest placed European teams currently embedded in the World Cricket League structure. The three nations with ODI status sent their second XIs to the tournament. Hosts Jersey were the champions, winning all their games.

Place	Team	Wins	Tied	NR	Loss	PTS	NRR
1	Jersey	5	0	0	0	10	1.46
2	Ireland A	4	0	0	1	8	1.17
3	Scotland A	2	0	0	3	4	0.22
4	Netherlands A	2	0	0	3	4	−1.31
5	Denmark	1	0	0	4	2	−0.77
6	Italy	1	0	0	4	2	−0.97

==== Division Two ====
The 2010 European Championship Division Two was held in Guernsey from 13 to 19 July. The ECC decided that the division would be made up of the three lowest placed teams currently embedded in the World Cricket League structure and the three next placed teams based on recent regional events. The highest placed of these latter teams at the end of the tournament would gain qualification for 2010 WCL Division Eight. Guernsey were the champions after winning all the games and Germany qualified for the Division Eight tournament. Although their net run rate was lower than that of France they earned qualification as they had won their match against the French side. Norway finished above Israel for the same reason.

Place	Team	Wins	Tied	NR	Loss	PTS	NRR
1	Guernsey	5	0	0	0	10	1.71
2	Germany	3	0	0	2	6	0.11
3	France	3	0	0	2	6	0.83
4	Norway	2	0	0	3	4	−0.38
5	Israel	2	0	0	3	4	−0.36
6	Gibraltar	0	0	0	5	0	−1.86

== Champions ==
=== Division One ===
Year	Venue	Champion	Runner-up
1996	(Denmark); Copenhagen	Ireland	Netherlands
1998	(Netherlands); The Hague	Netherlands	Denmark
2000	(Scotland); Glasgow	Netherlands	England
2002	(United Kingdom); Belfast	England	Scotland
2004	The Netherlands	England	Ireland
2006	(Scotland); Glasgow	Ireland	Scotland
2008	(Republic of Ireland); Dublin	Ireland	Scotland
2010	Jersey	Jersey	Ireland A
2011	Guernsey; Jersey	Denmark	Italy
2013	(England); Sussex	Italy	Denmark
2015	Jersey	Jersey	Denmark
2017	Netherlands	Germany	Sweden

=== Division Two ===
Year	Venue	Champion	Runner-up
1998	(Netherlands); The Hague	Italy	Germany
2000	(Scotland); Glasgow	Gibraltar	Germany
2002	(United Kingdom); Belfast	Gibraltar	Germany
2004	(Belgium); Antwerp	Italy	France
2006	(Scotland); Glasgow	Norway	Jersey
2008	Guernsey	Jersey	Guernsey
2010	Guernsey	Guernsey	Germany
2011	Belgium; Netherlands	Belgium	Austria
2012	(Greece); Corfu	Isle of Man	Sweden
2014	(England); Essex	Norway	Belgium
2016	(Sweden); Stockholm	Germany	Sweden

=== Division Three ===
Year	Venue	Champion	Runner-up
2007	(Belgium); Antwerp	Croatia	Spain
2009	(Spain); La Manga	Israel	Isle of Man
2011	(Slovenia) Valburga (Austria) Velden	Sweden	Estonia
2012	(Estonia); Tallinn	Estonia	Bulgaria
2014	(Spain); La Manga	Belgium	Spain

=== Division Four ===
Year	Venue	Champion	Runner-up
2006	(Belgium); Antwerp	Finland	Cyprus
2009	(Cyprus); Limassol	Cyprus	Switzerland

=== Division Five ===
Year	Venue	Champion	Runner-up
2009	(Greece); Corfu	Greece	Sweden

== Medals ==
=== Division One (1996-2015) ===
Rank	Nation	Gold	Silver	Bronze	Total
1	Ireland (IRL)	3	2	1	6
2	Netherlands (NED)	2	1	2	5
3	England (ENG)	2	1	0	3
4	Jersey (JEY)	2	0	2	4
5	Denmark (DEN)	1	3	2	6
6	Italy (ITA)	1	1	1	3
7	Scotland (SCO)	0	3	3	6
Totals (7 entries)		11	11	11	33

== See also ==
- European Cricket Council
- ICC Europe
- Women's European Cricket Championship
- European Affiliates Championship
- European Cricket League
- Euro League Baseball
