= Portuguese Cricket Federation =

Sports governing body in Portugal

- (Portugal)
- Sport: Cricket
- Founded: 1996
- Regional affiliation: ICC Europe
- Location: Estoril, Portugal
- Coach: (Portugal)

Official website
- www.cricketportugal.com
- (Portugal)

Portuguese Cricket Federation, also known as Federação Portuguesa de Cricket, is the official governing body of the sport of cricket in Portugal. Federação Portuguesa de Cricket has its headquarters in Estoril on the Portuguese Riviera. Portuguese Cricket Federation is the Portugal representative at the ICC and is an associate member and has been a member of that body since 1996. It is also a member of the ICC Europe (earlier the European Cricket Council).

== History ==
The Cricket Association of Portugal was formed in 1994. It became the Portuguese Cricket Federation in 2001. Portugal became an Affiliate member of the ICC in 1996.

The history of cricket in Portugal goes back to the days of the Peninsular War. this was when Wellington's British troops were encamped in Lisbon. There is an annual fixture between sides from Oporto and Lisbon played virtually every year since 1861.

== Clubs in Portuguese Cricket Federation ==
Given below is the list of various operating Cricket clubs in Portugal, which play different tournaments organised by Portuguese Cricket Federation:-

1. A.C.C.
2. Amigos C.C.A.
3. Algarve C.C.
4. Coimbra C.C.C.
5. C.H.P.
6. Friends C.C.
7. Oeiras C.C.
8. O.L.T.C.C.

== See also ==
- Portugal national cricket team
- Portugal women's national cricket team
- Portugal national under-19 cricket team
- Portugal women's national under-19 cricket team
