= List of Spain Twenty20 International cricketers =

This is a list of Spanish Twenty20 International cricketers.

In April 2018, the ICC decided to grant full Twenty20 International (T20I) status to all its members. Therefore, all Twenty20 matches played between Spain and other ICC members after 1 January 2019 will have T20I status. This list comprises all members of the Spain cricket team who have played at least one T20I match. It is initially arranged in the order in which each player won his first Twenty20 cap. Where more than one player won his first Twenty20 cap in the same match, those players are listed alphabetically by surname.

== Key ==
General

- ‡ – Captain
- † – Wicket-keeper
- First – Year of debut
- Last – Year of latest game
- Mat – Number of matches played

Batting

- Runs – Runs scored in career
- HS – Highest score
- 100 – Centuries scored
- 50 – Half-centuries scored
- Avg – Runs scored per dismissal
- * – Batsman remained not out

Bowling

- Balls – Balls bowled in career
- Wkt – Wickets taken in career
- BBI – Best bowling in an innings
- Ave – Average runs per wicket

Fielding

- Ca – Catches taken
- St – Stumpings affected

== List of players ==
Statistics are correct as of 21 August 2026.

Spain T20I cricketers
General					Batting					Bowling				Fielding		Ref
No.	Name	First	Last	Mat	Runs	HS	Avg	50	100	Balls	Wkt	BBI	Ave	Ca	St	Ref
1	Atif Mehmood	2019	2026	33	44	15	14.66	0	0	635	36	4/6	15.88	4	0	
2	Awais Ahmed†	2019	2023	28	364	102*	21.41	0	1	–	–	–	–	21	11	
3	Faran Afzal	2019	2019	9	141	59*	20.14	1	0	174	8	3/11	17.87	2	0	
4	Kuldeep Lal†	2019	2021	11	88	38	22.00	0	0	78	4	2/33	33.75	4	0	
5	Mukhtiar Singh	2019	2019	2	–	–	–	–	–	–	–	–	–	0	0	
6	Christian Munoz-Mills‡	2019	2026	51	388	33*	25.86	0	0	6	1	1/3	3.00	27	0	
7	Ravi Panchal	2019	2023	22	299	71*	27.18	1	0	216	8	3/22	24.62	10	0	
8	Tauqeer Hussain	2019	2020	6	6	3*	6.00	0	0	81	6	2/12	12.50	3	0	
9	Tom Vine	2019	2022	11	6	6*	–	0	0	156	11	4/28	18.90	0	0	
10	Yasir Ali†	2019	2026	47	953	80*	28.02	5	0	740	56	6/28	12.80	21	1	
11	Zulqarnain Haider	2019	2022	11	8	4	2.66	0	0	168	8	2/26	18.87	1	0	
12	Paul Hennessy	2019	2021	13	223	71	22.30	2	0	102	10	3/27	11.80	1	0	
13	Muhammad Asjed	2019	2021	3	16	9	8.00	0	0	6	0	–	–	1	0	
14	Hamza Dar	2019	2026	38	701	91*	31.86	4	0	96	4	1/1	32.25	5	0	
15	Vinod Kumar	2019	2020	4	28	17	9.33	0	0	–	–	–	–	2	0	
16	Raja Adeel	2019	2026	30	5	2*	1.25	0	0	612	35	3/8	16.88	4	0	
17	Jack Perman	2019	2021	7	43	30*	14.33	0	0	114	5	2/18	27.20	1	0	
18	Nadim Hussain	2019	2019	1	–	–	–	–	–	18	1	1/32	32.00	0	0	
19	Adam Algar†	2020	2023	6	40	28	40.00	0	0	–	–	–	–	2	0	
20	Charlie Rumistrzewicz	2021	2026	33	19	8*	6.33	0	0	678	51	5/7	10.78	9	0	
21	Lorne Burns‡	2022	2026	37	179	47	16.27	0	0	790	57	5/11	12.77	12	0	
22	Daniel Doyle-Calle	2022	2026	40	904	72	33.48	4	0	30	4	2/6	7.25	33	0	
23	Mohammad Kamran	2022	2026	27	150	52	13.63	1	0	553	37	5/9	13.10	9	0	
24	Josh Trembeath-Moro	2022	2022	8	137	39	27.40	0	0	–	–	–	–	6	0	
25	Mohammad Atif	2022	2026	13	1	1	1.00	0	0	290	16	3/7	15.31	7	0	
26	Prince Dhiman	2022	2022	4	41	29	10.25	0	0	–	–	–	–	3	0	
27	Mohammad Ihsan†	2022	2026	29	903	160	41.04	1	3	–	–	–	–	8	4	
28	Mohammad Yasin	2022	2024	12	185	34	15.41	0	0	–	–	–	–	1	0	
29	Ameer Hamzah	2023	2023	4	–	–	–	–	–	36	3	2/18	11.66	1	0	
30	Shafat Ali Syed	2023	2024	10	92	51	13.14	1	0	98	7	5/31	18.57	0	0	
31	Robiul Khan	2023	2023	1	–	–	–	–	–	18	1	1/26	26.00	1	0	
32	Muhammad Babar	2024	2024	2	61	46	30.50	0	0	–	–	–	–	0	0	
33	Alec Davidson Soler†	2024	2026	18	142	51	28.40	1	0	–	–	–	–	11	8	
34	Sebastian Hughes-Pinan	2024	2026	10	8	6*	–	0	0	224	13	5/12	11.38	4	0	
35	Daniel Long Martinez	2024	2024	2	83	79	41.50	1	0	–	–	–	–	2	0	
36	Gurvinder Bajwa	2025	2026	8	140	38*	23.33	0	0	–	–	–	–	1	0	
37	Adnan Tahir	2025	2025	2	4	4	4.00	0	0	–	–	–	–	1	0	
38	Cristofer Gwilliam-Lopez	2025	2025	1	–	–	–	–	–	18	1	1/19	19.00	0	0	
