= 2019 Iberia Cup =

International cricket tournament

- Date: 25–27 October 2019
- Location: Spain
- Result: Spain won the series
Teams
Gibraltar	Portugal	Spain
Captains
Matthew Hunter	Paolo Buccimazza	Christian Munoz-Mills
Most runs
Avanish Pai (124)	Najjam Shahzad (126)	Faran Afzal (121)
Most wickets
Avanish Pai (6)	Tariq Aziz (6)	Yasir Ali (4)

The 2019 Iberia Cup was a Twenty20 International (T20I) cricket tournament held in Spain between 25 and 27 October 2019. The participating teams were the hosts Spain, along with Gibraltar and Portugal. The teams competed for the Iberian Cup, which was contested in the 1990s, and was last played in 2008 as a double match series between Spain and Gibraltar. Gibraltar and Portugal played their first matches with T20I status during the tournament, following the decision of the International Cricket Council (ICC) to grant full Twenty20 International status to all its members from 1 January 2019. Spain won the series with a 100% record.

== Squads ==
Gibraltar	Portugal	Spain
Matthew Hunter (c); Nikhil Advani; Mark Bacarese; Tim Caruana; Luke Collado (wk); Chris Delany; James Fitzgerald; Julian Freyone; Mark Garratt; Richard Hatchman; Kenroy Nestor; Adam Orfila; Edmund Packard; Avinash Pai	Paolo Buccimazza (c); Arslan Ahmed; Yousef Awan; Tariq Aziz; Aamer Ikram; Imran Khan; Assad Mehmood; Mien Mehmood; Fakhrul Mohon; Ali Naqi; Zohaib Sarwar; Najjam Shahzad; Davinder Singh; Sukhwinder Singh; Francoise Stoman (wk)	Christian Munoz-Mills (c); Raja Adeel; Faran Afzal; Awais Ahmed (wk); Yasir Ali; Zulqarnain Haider; Paul Hennessy; Tauqeer Hussain; Vinod Kumar; Kuldeep Lal; Atif Mehmood; Rhys Morgan; Nadim Hussain Naureen; Ravi Panchal; Jack Perman; Mukhtiar Singh; Tom Vine

== Points table ==
Team	P	W	L	T	NR	Pts	NRR
Spain (C)	4	4	0	0	0	8	+1.627
Portugal	4	2	2	0	0	4	–0.595
Gibraltar	4	0	4	0	0	0	–0.969

== Fixtures ==
25 October 2019
15:00
Scorecard

Portugal; 87/7 (20 overs)	v	Spain; 89/2 (14.2 overs)
Najjam Shahzad 27* (31); Faran Afzal 2/14 (4 overs)		Paul Hennessy 38 (30); Tariq Aziz 2/26 (4 overs)

Spain won by 8 wickets
La Manga Club Bottom Ground, Cartagena
Umpires: Sunil Chandiramani (Gib) and Adnan Khan (Esp)

- Spain won the toss and elected to field.
- Raja Adeel (Esp), Arslan Ahmed, Tariq Aziz, Paolo Buccimazza, Aamer Ikram, Imran Khan, Mien Mehmood, Fakhrul Mohon, Ali Naqi, Zohaib Sarwar, Najjam Shahzad and Francoise Stoman (Por) all made their T20I debuts.

26 October 2019
08:45
Scorecard

Gibraltar; 113/6 (20 overs)	v	Portugal; 116/4 (18.3 overs)
Avinash Pai 52 (52); Paolo Buccimazza 2/18 (4 overs)		Zohaib Sarwar 33* (21); Avinash Pai 2/18 (4 overs)

Portugal won by 6 wickets
La Manga Club Bottom Ground, Cartagena
Umpires: Gordon Ashford (Esp) and Adnan Khan (Esp)

- Gibraltar won the toss and elected to bat.
- Mark Bacarese, Luke Collado, Chris Delany, James Fitzgerald, Julian Freyone, Mark Garratt, Richard Hatchman, Matthew Hunter, Kenroy Nestor, Edmund Packard and Avinash Pai (Gib) all made their T20I debuts.

26 October 2019
12:15
Scorecard

Gibraltar; 98/6 (20 overs)	v	Spain; 99/2 (15 overs)
Edmund Packard 26 (33); Yasir Ali 2/16 (3 overs)		Faran Afzal 59* (43); Edmund Packard 1/8 (2 overs)

Spain won by 8 wickets
La Manga Club Bottom Ground, Cartagena
Umpires: Sunil Chandiramani (Gib) and Adnan Khan (Esp)

- Spain won the toss and elected to field.
- Jack Perman (Esp) and Tim Caruana (Gib) both made their T20I debuts.

26 October 2019
15:15
Scorecard

Spain; 143/6 (20 overs)	v	Portugal; 114 (17.4 overs)
Faran Afzal 41 (38); Tariq Aziz 3/20 (4 overs)		Najjam Shahzad 46 (31); Paul Hennessy 2/12 (2 overs)

Spain won by 29 runs
La Manga Club Bottom Ground, Cartagena
Umpires: Gordon Ashford (Esp) and Adnan Khan (Esp)

- Portugal won the toss and elected to field.
- Nadim Hussain Naureen (Esp) and Sukhwinder Singh (Por) both made their T20I debuts.

27 October 2019
10:00
Scorecard

Gibraltar; 107/7 (20 overs)	v	Portugal; 110/6 (19.2 overs)
Avinash Pai 35 (45); Najjam Shahzad 2/16 (4 overs)		Najjam Shahzad 53* (35); Avinash Pai 3/14 (4 overs)

Portugal won by 4 wickets
La Manga Club Bottom Ground, Cartagena
Umpires: Gordon Ashford (Esp) and Sunil Chandiramani (Gib)

- Portugal won the toss and elected to field.

27 October 2019
14:00
Scorecard

Gibraltar; 95 (19.5 overs)	v	Spain; 96/4 (15.5 overs)
Matthew Hunter 27 (33); Yasir Ali 2/11 (3 overs)		Yasir Ali 42* (33); Matthew Hunter 1/8 (2 overs)

Spain won by 6 wickets
La Manga Club Bottom Ground, Cartagena
Umpires: Sunil Chandiramani (Gib) and Adnan Khan (Esp)

- Spain won the toss and elected to field.
- Nikhil Advani and Adam Orfila (Gib) both made their T20I debuts.
