= Israel national cricket team =

Israel
- Nickname: Cricket Bible
- Association: Israel Cricket Association

Personnel
- Captain: Shailesh Bangera
- Coach: Isaac Massil

International Cricket Council
- ICC status: Associate member (1974)
- ICC region: Europe
ICC Rankings	Current	Best-ever
T20I	74th	61st (2 May 2019)

International cricket
- First international: 22 May 1979 v USA at Solihull, England

One Day Internationals
- World Cup Qualifier appearances: 7 (first in 1979)
- Best result: Plate competition, 1990 and 1994

T20 Internationals
- First T20I: v Portugal at Royal Brussels Cricket Club, Waterloo; 28 June 2022
- Last T20I: v Isle of Man at Tikkurila Cricket Ground, Vantaa; 21 August 2026
T20Is	Played	Won/Lost
Total	18	5/13 (0 ties, 0 no results)
This year	9	2/7 (0 ties, 0 no results)
T20I kit
- As of 21 August 2026

The Israel national cricket team represents Israel in international cricket. Despite being geographically part of the Middle East, they are members of the ICC Europe.

They regularly take part in the European Championship, and are currently ranked the 28th best non-Test team in Europe by the International Cricket Council (ICC), having been an associate member of that organisation since 1974.

In April 2018, the ICC decided to grant full Twenty20 International (T20I) status to all its members. Therefore, all Twenty20 matches played between Israel and other ICC members after 1 January 2019 hold the T20I status.

== History ==
=== Beginnings ===
As is most often the case, cricket was introduced to Israel by the British. Local enthusiasts managed to keep the game going once the British had left in 1948, but the game was struggling until the mid-1960s, when an influx of Jewish immigrants from cricket-playing countries, mainly South Africa, United Kingdom, and the Indian subcontinent, revived the game.

The first national league was formed in 1966, which led to the formation of the Israel Cricket Association (ICA) in 1968. The league prospered despite conditions ill-suited to cricket. Games were played on dusty, grass-less football fields, on matting wickets. However, the enthusiasm of the players has overcome these drawbacks.

=== ICC membership ===
Israel became an associate member of the ICC in 1974, with only Pakistan opposing their membership. Israel competed in the first ICC Trophy in 1979, failing to get past the first round. They also failed to progress beyond the first round in the 1982 and 1986 tournaments.

They reached the plate competition of the ICC Trophy in 1990 and 1994 and in 1996 competed in the first European Championship in Denmark, finishing eighth in the eight team tournament. The 1997 ICC Trophy in Malaysia gave them a brief, though unwanted, moment in the spotlight. Malaysia does not recognise the state of Israel, and they faced political demonstrations throughout the tournament from the Islamic Party of Malaysia. They were the first Israeli sports team to play in the country and finished in 22nd and last place.

In 1998, they finished ninth in the European Championship ahead of only Gibraltar and the following year travelled to Gibraltar to take part in a quadrangular tournament also involving France and Italy, losing to France in the third place play-off.

=== 21st century ===
Israel have been playing in Division Two of the European Championships since 2000, finishing fifth in 2000, fourth in 2002 and sixth in 2004. In the 2006 tournament, the Israeli team were again met with protests, due to the then ongoing crisis in the Middle East. Their first match, against Jersey was cancelled and their remaining two group games were met by protests. Their play-off games were then moved to RAF Lossiemouth to be played under armed guard. The second of these games, against Greece was forfeited by the Greeks, who had travel problems. Israel thus finished in seventh place.

In November 2007, Israel were defeated in a relegation match against Croatia, in the first international cricket game played in Israel. The loss meant that they were relegated from the 2nd European division, to the 3rd Division. In 2009 they got promoted to Second division with a win over Croatia.

==== Men's T20 World Cup qualifiers ====
Israel participated in T20 World Cup qualification for the first time when it took part in qualifiers in the Netherlands for the 2021 T20 World Cup.It was in Group C along with Norway, Guernsey, Sweden, Czech Republic and Gibraltar. Its lone win was a 52 run victory over Gibraltar.

Israel was to participate in qualifiers in Finland for the 2022 T20 World Cup. Due to the COVID-19 pandemic these were cancelled.

Given the change in the ICC laws, despite playing matches in previous years, Israel's participation in the qualifiers in Belgium for the 2024 T20 World Cup was recognised as its first official T20 internationals. Israel was in Group 2 of Qualifier C along with Spain, Portugal and Malta. Israel didn't win a game in pool play, losing to Portugal by 47 runs, to Spain by 7 wickets and to Malta by 16 runs. In the 7th place play-off, it defeated Hungary by 12 runs with Gabriel Schachat adjudged man of the match.

These are the details of the match against Portugal, its first-ever official T20 International.

28 June 2022
16:00
Scorecard

Portugal; 155/8 (20 overs)	v	Israel; 108/6 (20 overs)
Kuldeep 39 (29); Niv Nagavkar 2/19 (3 overs)		Michael Cohen 27* (29); Amandeep Singh 3/11 (4 overs)

Portugal won by 47 runs
Royal Brussels Cricket Club, Waterloo
Umpires: Mark Jameson (Ger) and Ryan Milne (Sco)
Player of the match: Amandeep Singh (Por)

- Israel won the toss and elected to field.

Israel participated in qualifiers in Italy for the 2026 T20 World Cup. It was in Group 2 of Qualifier A along with Austria, Hungary, Portugal, and Romania.

== Tournament history ==
=== ICC Trophy/World Cup Qualifier ===
Men's Cricket World Cup Qualifier records
Year	Round	Position	GP	W	L	T	NR
(England) 1979	Group stage	12/15	4	1	3	0	0
(England) 1982	Group stage	16/16	7	0	5	0	2
(England) 1986	Group stage	16/16	8	0	8	0	0
(Netherlands) 1990	Plate competition	17/17	7	1	6	0	0
(Kenya) 1994	Plate competition	15/20	7	1	6	0	0
(Malaysia) 1997	Plate competition	=21/22	7	0	7	0	0
(Canada) 2001	Division two	22/24	5	0	5	0	0
2005 – 2023	Did not qualify						
Total	7/12	0 Titles	45	3	40	0	2

=== Other tournaments ===
T20 World Cup Europe Sub-regional Qualifiers	European Cricket Championship (defunct)	European T20 Championship (defunct)
(Netherlands) 2018: 4th place; (Belgium) 2022: 6th place; (Italy) 2024: 7th place	(Denmark) 1996 (Division one): 8th place — remained; (Netherlands) 1998 (Division one): 9th place — relegated; (Scotland) 2000 (Division two): 5th place — remained; (Republic of Ireland) 2002 (Division two): 4th place — remained; (Belgium) 2004 (Division two): 6th place — remained; (Scotland) 2006 (Division two): 7th place — remained; (Israel) 2007 (Division two playoff): Lost to Croatia — relegated; (Spain) 2008 (Division three): Winners — promoted; (Israel) 2007 (Division two playoff): Won — promoted; (Guernsey) 2010 (Division two): 5th place	(Guernsey) (Jersey) 2011 (Division one): 11th place — relegated; (Greece) 2012 (Division two): 4th place — relegated; (Spain) 2014 (Division two): 3rd place; (Sweden) 2016 (Division two): 4th place

== Records and statistics ==
International Match Summary — Portugal

Last updated 21 August 2026

Playing Record
Format	M	W	L	T	NR	Inaugural Match
Twenty20 Internationals	18	5	13	0	0	28 June 2022

=== Twenty20 International ===
T20I record versus other nations

Records complete to T20I #4095. Last updated 21 August 2026.

Opponent	M	W	L	T	NR	First match	First win
vs Associate Members
Austria	2	0	2	0	0	10 June 2024	
Czech Republic	1	1	0	0	0	18 August 2026	18 August 2026
France	1	0	1	0	0	29 July 2026	
Germany	1	0	1	0	0	17 August 2026	
Greece	1	1	0	0	0	20 August 2026	20 August 2026
Hungary	2	1	1	0	0	3 July 2022	3 July 2022
Isle of Man	1	0	1	0	0	21 August 2026	
Luxembourg	1	1	0	0	0	16 June 2024	16 June 2024
Malta	1	0	1	0	0	1 July 2022	
Portugal	3	1	2	0	0	28 June 2022	13 June 2024
Romania	2	0	2	0	0	15 June 2024	
Spain	1	0	1	0	0	29 June 2022	
Turkey	1	0	1	0	0	28 July 2026	

=== Other matches ===
For a list of selected international matches played by Israel, see Cricket Archive.

== Current squad ==
Updated as of 9 August 2024.

This lists all the players who were part of the Israeli squad for the 2024 Men's T20 World Cup Europe Sub-regional Qualifier A.

Name	Age	Batting style	Bowling style	Last T20I	Notes
Batters
Eshkol Solomon	41	Right-handed	Right-arm medium	(Luxembourg) 2024	Captain
Yogev Nagavkar	25	Right-handed	Right-arm medium	(Luxembourg) 2024	
Warna Narayana	34	Right-handed	Right-arm medium	(Luxembourg) 2024	
All-rounder
Josh Evans	34	Right-handed	Leg break	(Luxembourg) 2024	
Yarden Divekar	29	Right-handed	Right-arm medium	(Luxembourg) 2024	
Tomer Kahamker	16	Right-handed	Right-arm medium	(Luxembourg) 2024	
Virendra Kumar	45	Right-handed	Right-arm medium	(Luxembourg) 2025	
Niv Nagavkar	23	Right-handed	Left-arm medium	(Luxembourg) 2024	
Yair Nagavkar	24	Right-handed	Right-arm off break	(Romania) 2024	
Aviel Warsulkar	29	Right-handed	Right-arm medium	(Romania) 2024	
Wicket-keeper
Shailesh Bangera	48	Right-handed	—N/a	(Luxembourg) 2024	
Eyal Bhonkar	27	Right-handed	—N/a	(Luxembourg) 2024	
Prathapa Siriwardhana	37	Right-handed	Right-arm medium-fast	(Romania) 2024	
Pace Bowlers
Elan Talker	32	Right-handed	Right-arm medium	(Luxembourg) 2024	

== See also ==
- List of Israel Twenty20 International cricketers
- Sports in Israel
