= Portugal national cricket team =

Portugal
- Association: Portuguese Cricket Federation

Personnel
- Captain: Moises Henriques
- Coach: Ayzaz Hussain

International Cricket Council
- ICC status: Associate member (2017)
- ICC region: Europe
ICC Rankings	Current	Best-ever
T20I	35th	35th (15 August 2026)

International cricket
- First international: v Greece at Lyceum Alpinum, Zuoz; 19 August 1997

T20 Internationals
- First T20I: v Spain at La Manga Club, Cartagena; 25 October 2019
- Last T20I: v Spain at Kerava National Cricket Ground, Kerava; 21 August 2026
T20Is	Played	Won/Lost
Total	52	40/10 (1 tie, 1 no result)
This year	17	14/1 (1 tie, 1 no result)
T20I kit
- As of 21 August 2026

The Portuguese national cricket team represents the country of Portugal in international cricket. The Portuguese Cricket Federation became an affiliate member of the International Cricket Council (ICC) in 1996 and an associate member in 2017.

== History ==
=== Beginnings ===
Cricket in Portugal dates back to the Peninsular War of 1809–1814, when English troops were encamped in Lisbon. A game between sides from Porto and Lisbon has been played almost every year since 1861. English club teams paid frequent visits; the Cryptics Cricket Club toured eight times between 1924 and 1939. The game was confined, however, to the expatriate community, particularly the port wine manufacturers of Porto, until events in 1974 gave Portuguese cricket an unexpected boost.

=== Playing numbers increase ===
The Carnation Revolution led to many Portuguese citizens returning from their former overseas province of Goa, and the subsequent independence of Mozambique brought many Portuguese citizens back, bringing cricket with them. Other Portuguese citizens living in Portugal's former African overseas provinces moved to Rhodesia and South Africa, where their children were absorbed into the sporting cultures of those countries, and the subsequent socio-political changes there led to them bringing their love of cricket back to Portugal.

=== International competition ===
The Cricket Association of Portugal was founded in 1994 and they became an ICC member two years later. Their first international engagement was in the European Nations Cup in Switzerland in 1997, where they reached the semi-finals. They competed in that tournament's successor, the ECC Trophy in 1999, finishing as runners up and qualifying for Division Two of the European Championship in 2000. They finished fourth in that tournament.

They again played in the ECC Trophy in 2001, this time winning the tournament, again qualifying for Division Two of the European Championship in 2002. They finished third and then played in the ECC Trophy in 2003. This time their performances from the previous two tournaments did not continue and they finished in 5th place, a performance they repeated in the European Affiliates Championship in 2005. They will compete in Division Three of the European Championships in 2007.

=== 1st tournament (The European Nations Cup 1997) ===
In 1997 Portugal played their first tournament. It was the European Nations Cup 1997. They also played their first match in that tournament. Their first match was against Greece at Lyceum Alpinum, Zuoz, Switzerland 19 August 1997. In that match Portugal made a 381/3 batting first and their players TG Rankine and Intesab Mehdi has scored two fine innings of 173 and 81*. After Portugal's innings Greece came down to bat. But for the bashing bowling of Portugal's bowlers Greece was all out at 115 in 29 overs. Santilal made the best bowling figure (3/27 in 6 overs) in Portugal's innings. Portugal won that match by 266 runs. In their second match on 20 August 1997 against Malta at the same stadium Portugal batted first. They scored 297/9. Opener Nadeem Butt scored a wonderful 96 run innings. Again the bowlers of Portugal bowled well. Daia had made a figure of 10–2–35–3. Malta was all out in 187 in 41 overs. Portugal won that match by 110 runs. In their last match on 21 August 1997 against Austria at the same stadium Portugal batted First like the two other matches. But this match Portugal could make a 240/7. Nazir Usman made the highest run of 45, while lower order batsman Daia and G Ramchande made a 39 and 27. They made 72 runs partnership in the 7th wicket. Austria did well. But they couldn't reached to the destination of 241 in 50 overs. But they made a 214 in 46.1 overs. 1st down Batsman A Simpson-Parker made the highest score of Austria's innings. He scored 55. G Ramchande made 3/41 in 9.1 overs. Portugal won that match by 26 runs.

Portugal was top of the group B with 6 points in 3 matches.

In the semi-final, Portugal, champion of Group B, met France, the runners up of Group A. Portugal lost that match against France. Portugal batted first for a fourth consecutive time. But in the semi-final Portugal's batting line-up was outmatched against the France's bowling. Portugal managed a 156 all out in 40.4 overs. Nadeem Butt scored 33 runs which was the highest runs of Portugal's innings. France made 157 very easily in 45.3 overs with 7 wickets in hand. Number 3 batsman N Jones made a 60.

Because of the unexpected defeat against France, Portugal was knocked out from the semi-final of The European Nations Cup 1997.

=== 2018–present ===
In April 2018, the ICC decided to grant full Twenty20 International (T20I) status to all its members. Therefore, all Twenty20 matches played between Portugal and other ICC members after 1 January 2019 will be a full T20I.

Portugal played their first T20I on 25 October 2019, against Spain, during the 2019 Iberia Cup.

25 October 2019
15:00
Scorecard

Portugal; 87/7 (20 overs)	v	Spain; 89/2 (14.2 overs)
Najjam Shahzad 27* (31); Faran Afzal 2/14 (4 overs)		Paul Hennessy 38 (30); Tariq Aziz 2/26 (4 overs)

Spain won by 8 wickets
La Manga Club Bottom Ground, Cartagena
Umpires: Sunil Chandiramani (Gib) and Adnan Khan (Esp)

- Spain won the toss and elected to field.
- First ever T20I match for Portugal.

In August 2026, Portugal won the T20 World Cup Europe Sub-regional Qualifier C going unbeaten throughout the tournament and defeating Spain by 57 runs in the final. The event was part of the qualification process for the 2028 Men's T20 World Cup and as a result of their success they advanced to the regional final.

== Tournament history ==
=== European Championship ===
- 1996: Did not participate
- 1998: Did not qualify
- 2000: 4th place (Division Two)
- 2002: 3rd place (Division Two)
- 2004: Did not qualify
- 2006: Did not qualify

=== European Affiliates Championship ===
- 1999: Runner-up
- 2001: Champion
- 2003: 5th place
- 2005: 5th place
- 2007: 5th place
- 2009: 6th place

== Domestic cricket ==
The only league in Portuguese cricket for the last decade has been the Lisbon League, which has been played by a varying number of local clubs (between three and seven) depending on the economic activity in the area. Most recently, the National League has been contested by Lisbon-based teams and two new clubs – one from the Algarve and one from Almoster. There are four registered clubs – Asian CC, Oeiras CC, Comunidade Hindu Portuguesa CC (CHP), and Friends CC in the Lisbon area, with a club in Oporto (Oporto Cricket and Lawn Tennis Club), a club in the Algarve (Barrington's CC) and one from Almoster (Presban CC). Over the years the Asian CC has dominated the league.

== International grounds ==
Locations of all stadiums which have hosted an international cricket match within Portugal

Ground	City	Region	Capacity	Matches hosted	Notes
Lisbon Cricket Ground	Lisbon	Lisbon Region	800	T10s, club matches	ICC approved Historic venue, home to Oeiras Cricket Club; Hosts the National League, ICC events and open to touring teams.

== Records and statistics ==
International Match Summary — Portugal

Last updated 21 August 2026

Playing Record
Format	M	W	L	T	NR	Inaugural Match
Twenty20 Internationals	52	40	10	1	1	25 October 2019

=== Twenty20 International ===
- Highest team total: 218/6 v Gibraltar on 22 August 2021 at Gucherre Cricket Ground, Albergaria.
- Highest individual score: 125, Christopher De Freitas v France on 6 April 2026 at Gucherre Cricket Ground, Albergaria.
- Best individual bowling figures: 5/17, Sirajullah Khadim v Malta on 4 May 2023 at Europa Sports Park, Gibraltar.

T20I record versus other nations

Records complete to T20I #4096. Last updated 21 August 2026.

Opponent	M	W	L	T	NR	First match	First win
vs Associate Members
Austria	1	0	1	0	0	12 June 2024	
Belgium	4	3	1	0	0	2 July 2022	
Czech Republic	1	1	0	0	0	20 August 2026	
Denmark	1	0	1	0	0	4 July 2022	
Finland	3	2	0	0	1	3 July 2026	
France	4	3	1	0	0	5 April 2026	
Germany	1	1	0	0	0	15 August 2026	
Gibraltar	10	10	0	0	0	26 October 2019	
Greece	1	1	0	0	0	17 August 2026	
Hungary	1	1	0	0	0	9 June 2024	
Isle of Man	1	1	0	0	0	16 June 2024	
Israel	3	2	1	0	0	28 June 2022	
Malta	8	8	0	0	0	19 August 2021	
Norway	5	4	1	0	0	7 April 2025	8 April 2025
Romania	1	0	1	0	0	10 June 2024	
Spain	4	1	3	0	0	25 October 2019	21 August 2026
Sweden	3	2	0	1	0	1 July 2026	

== See also ==
- List of Portugal Twenty20 International cricketers
- Portuguese Cricket Federation
