= Spain national cricket team =

Cricket team

Spain
- Flag of Spain
- Association: Cricket Spain

Personnel
- Captain: Christian Muñoz-Mills
- Coach: Corey Rutgers

International Cricket Council
- ICC status: Associate member (2017); Affiliate member (1992)
- ICC region: Europe
ICC Rankings	Current	Best-ever
T20I	25th	25th (18 Aug 2026)

International cricket
- First international: 13 August 2001 v Portugal at Seebarn Cricket Ground, Austria

T20 Internationals
- First T20I: v Malta at La Manga Club, Cartagena; 29 March 2019
- Last T20I: v Portugal at Kerava National Cricket Ground, Kerava; 21 August 2026
T20Is	Played	Won/Lost
Total	54	44/9 (0 ties, 1 no result)
This year	5	4/1 (0 ties, 0 no results)
T20I kit
- As of 21 August 2026

The Spanish national cricket team represents Spain in international cricket. They became an affiliate member of the International Cricket Council (ICC) in 1992 and an associate member in 2017. They made their international debut in the ECC Trophy in 2001, finishing in 6th place. They played in the tournament again in 2001, this time finishing seventh. In the equivalent tournament in 2005, the European Affiliates Championship, they put in a much improved performance to finish third, just missing out on promotion to Division Two of the European Championship. They played in Division Three of that tournament in 2007 and again in 2009.

In April 2018, the ICC decided to grant full Twenty20 International (T20I) status to all its members. Therefore, all Twenty20 matches played between Spain and other ICC members after 1 January 2019 were to have the T20I status.

== History ==
Cricket is first recorded as being played in Spain in the year 1809 by soldiers of General Lord Wellesley (later the Duke of Wellington). During the Peninsular War the soldiers played the game in and around Ciudad Rodrigo, Lugo and Orense. There are many records of the game being played by visiting British land and sea forces, either among themselves or against local British expatriate communities.

The game entered a new era in Spain with the founding of Madrid Cricket Club in 1975. It was based at first on British and Indian players, but soon West Indian and Spanish members joined.

In June 1989, a National Executive Committee was formed and the first steps were taken to unify all of the cricket playing clubs in Spain.

=== First International Tournament (ECC Trophy/ICC Europe Championships) ===
Spain played their first tournament in 2001 in Austria. It was the ECC Trophy 2001. They also played their first match of their international cricket history in that tournament. They were in the Seebern Group amongst 2 groups. In their group there were Portugal, Malta, Finland and Sweden. Every match of the tournament was 35 overs.

They played their first match on13 August 2001 at the Seebarn Cricket Centre No 1 Ground, Lower Austria against Portugal. After winning the toss Portugal came down to bat and scored 229/6 in 35 overs. Opener Nadeem Butt scored 69. But due to their slow overrate Spain could play 32 overs. In 32 overs Portugal made 166/7. G Howe made 40 the highest score of Spain's innings. Portuguese bowler Bagvanadaia made 3/19 in 4 overs. So Spain lost their 1st international match against Portugal by 63 runs.

Spain's next matches was against Finland. It was on 14 August 2001 at Seebarn Cricket Centre No. 2 Ground, Lower Austria. After winning toss Spain came down to bat. They made 222/3 in 35 overs. Batsman G Howe made 103 which was the highest of Spain's innings. Finish bowler Scott Thurling took 2/36 in 7 overs. In bowling Spain smashed their opponent Finland. Finland could make 141/9 in 35 overs. Scott Thurling made highest 43 in Finland's innings. G Howe took 3/29 in 7 overs. Spain got a victory of 81 runs and got their first win in international cricket.

=== 2018–present ===
In April 2018, the ICC decided to grant full Twenty20 International (T20I) status to all its members. Therefore, all Twenty20 matches played between Spain and other ICC members since 1 January 2019 have been full T20I.

Spain played its first ever T20I against Malta on 29 March 2019, during the 2019 Spain Triangular T20I Series. The match was played at La Manga Club, Murcia, Spain.

29 March 2019
15:30
Scorecard

Malta; 98/9 (20 overs)	v	Spain; 99/3 (12.1 overs)
Bikram Arora 28 (25); Tom Vine 4/28 (4 overs)		Yasir Ali 57 (40); Jurg Hirschi 1/15 (2 overs)

Spain won by 7 wickets
La Manga Club, Murcia
Umpires: Adnan Khan (Esp) and Harmit Phull (Esp)

- Malta won the toss and elected to bat.
- First ever T20I match for Spain.

== Tournament history ==
=== European Cricket Championship ===
- 2001: 6th place
- 2003: 7th place
- 2022: 3rd place
- 2023: 3rd place

=== European Affiliates Championship ===
- 2005: 3rd place

=== ICC Europe Division 3 Championship ===
- 2007: Runners-up
- 2009: 3rd place

=== Iberia Cup ===
- 2019: Winners

== Current squad ==
This lists all the players who have played for Spain in the past 12 months or has been part of the latest T20I squad. Updated as of 28 August 2024.

Name	Age	Batting style	Bowling style	Notes
Batters
Christian Munoz-Mills	35	Right-handed	Right-arm off break	Captain
Daniel Doyle-Calle	28	Right-handed		
Mohammad Ihsan	30	Right-handed		
Hamza Dar	31	Left-handed	Right-arm medium	
Mohammad Yasin	36	Left-handed		
All-rounders
Yasir Ali	34	Right-handed	Right-arm off break	
Shafat Ali Syed	30	Left-handed	Left-arm medium	
Wicket-keeper
Alec Davidson-Soler	22	Right-handed		
Spin Bowlers
Lorne Burns	33	Right-handed	Right-arm leg break	Vice-captain
Charlie Rumistrzewicz	21	Right-handed	Slow left-arm orthodox	
Sebastian Hughes-Piñan	20	Left-handed	Slow left-arm orthodox	
Pace Bowlers
Atif Mehmood	39	Right-handed	Left-arm medium-fast	
Mohammad Kamran	39	Right-handed	Left-arm medium-fast	
Raja Adeel	39	Right-handed	Right-arm fast	
Mohammad Atif	26	Right-handed	Left-arm medium	

== Head coach ==
Corey Leigh Rutgers (born 28 May 1989 in Footscray, Victoria) is a former Western Australia country and grade cricketer. He was cricket academy head coach for VOC Rotterdam in the Netherlands and also worked as assistant coach for Pakistan Super League team Islamabad United for almost two years.

In August 2019, Rutgers was appointed head coach of the Belgium national cricket team. He resigned in July 2021 after a dispute with Belgium cricket board officials over team selection.

In November 2021, Rutgers signed with the Espana National cricket federation as head coach.

== International grounds ==
Locations of all stadiums which have hosted an international cricket match within Spain

Ground	City	Region	Capacity	Matches hosted	Notes
Desert Springs Cricket Ground	Cuevas del Almanzora	Andalusia	600	T20Is, ICC Europe events	Spain’s only fully ICC‑approved international venue ()
La Manga Club	La Manga Club	Murcia	500	T20Is, Women’s T20Is	Venue for European Cricket Series and ICC events ()
Cartama Oval	Cártama	Andalusia	800	T10s, T20Is	Host of European Cricket League/New European tournaments ()
La Elipa	Madrid	Madrid	1,000	T10s, T20 tournaments	Site of 2025 European Cricket Series Madrid

== Records and statistics ==
International Match Summary — Spain

Last updated 21 August 2026

Playing Record
Format	M	W	L	T	NR	Inaugural Match
Twenty20 Internationals	54	44	9	0	1	29 March 2019

=== Twenty20 International ===
- Highest team total: 290/3 v Croatia, 7 December 2025 at La Manga Club Ground, Cartagena
- Highest individual score: 160, Mohammad Ihsan v Croatia, 7 December 2025 at La Manga Club Ground, Cartagena
- Best individual bowling figures: 6/28, Yasir Ali v Croatia, 2 August 2024 at Mladost Cricket Ground, Zagreb

Most T20I runs for Spain

Player	Runs	Average	Career span
Yasir Ali	953	28.02	2019–2026
Daniel Doyle-Calle	904	33.48	2022–2026
Mohammad Ihsan	903	41.04	2022–2026
Hamza Dar	701	31.86	2019–2026
Christian Munoz-Mills	388	25.86	2019–2026

Most T20I wickets for Spain

Player	Wickets	Average	Career span
Lorne Burns	57	12.77	2022–2026
Yasir Ali	56	12.80	2019–2026
Charlie Rumistrzewicz	51	10.78	2021–2026
Atif Mehmood	36	15.88	2019–2026
Raja Adeel	35	16.88	2019–2026

T20I record versus other nations

Records complete to T20I #4096. Last updated 21 August 2026.

Opponent	M	W	L	T	NR	First match	First win
vs Associate Members
Belgium	1	0	1	0	0	4 July 2022	
Bulgaria	1	1	0	0	0	18 August 2026	18 August 2026
Croatia	10	10	0	0	0	2 August 2024	2 August 2024
Cyprus	1	1	0	0	0	21 August 2024	21 August 2024
Czech Republic	1	1	0	0	0	22 August 2024	22 August 2024
Denmark	1	0	1	0	0	2 July 2022	
Finland	5	4	1	0	0	17 August 2019	17 August 2019
Germany	7	4	3	0	0	8 March 2020	8 March 2020
Gibraltar	2	2	0	0	0	26 October 2019	26 October 2019
Greece	1	1	0	0	0	25 August 2024	25 August 2024
Guernsey	2	1	1	0	0	30 April 2022	30 April 2022
Isle of Man	7	6	0	0	1	24 February 2023	24 February 2023
Israel	1	1	0	0	0	29 June 2022	29 June 2022
Italy	2	1	1	0	0	5 November 2022	5 November 2022
Jersey	2	2	0	0	0	14 April 2024	14 April 2024
Luxembourg	1	1	0	0	0	17 August 2026	17 August 2026
Malta	3	3	0	0	0	29 March 2019	29 March 2019
Norway	2	2	0	0	0	30 April 2022	30 April 2022
Portugal	4	3	1	0	0	25 October 2019	25 October 2019

== See also ==
- List of Spain Twenty20 International cricketers
