= 2027 Men's T20 World Cup Europe Regional Final =

Qualifying tournament for the 2028 T20WC

2027 ICC Men's T20 World Cup Europe Regional Final
- Dates: TBD – 2027
- Administrator: ICC Europe
- Cricket format: Round-robin
- Tournament format: Twenty20 International
- Host: TBD
- Participants: 6
- Matches: 15

The 2027 ICC Men's T20 World Cup Europe Regional Final will be a cricket tournament that will form part of the qualification process for the 2028 Men's T20 World Cup. The top two teams will join Italy and Netherlands as Europe's representatives at the 2028 Men's T20 World Cup Global Qualifier.

England qualified directly for the World Cup as one of the top eight teams from the previous edition, while Ireland qualified directly through ICC Men's T20I Team Rankings.

== Teams and qualification ==
The tournament will feature six teams; the two finalists of sub-regional qualifiers A and C along with the winner of qualifier B and Scotland, who received a bye after participating in the 2026 Men's T20 World Cup.

In August 2026, the runners-up of Sub-Regional Qualifiers A and C — Guernsey and Spain, respectively were awarded places in the regional final following a review of the qualification pathway. Initially, only the winners of the two sub-regional qualifiers were set to advance to the regional final stage.

Teams qualified for the Europe regional final
Method of qualification	Date of qualification	Venue(s)	No. of teams	Qualified teams
2026 Men's T20 World Cup	24 January 2026	India & Sri Lanka	1	Scotland
Europe Qualifier A	23 May 2026	Cyprus	2	Guernsey
Europe Qualifier A	23 May 2026	Cyprus	2	Jersey
Europe Qualifier B	15 July 2026	Denmark	1	Denmark
Europe Qualifier C	21 August 2026	Finland	2	Portugal
Europe Qualifier C	21 August 2026	Finland	2	Spain
Total			6	

== Points table ==
Regional final standings
Pos	Team	Pld	W	L	NR	Pts	NRR	Qualification
1	Denmark	0	0	0	0	0	—	Advance to the global qualifier
2	Guernsey	0	0	0	0	0	—	Advance to the global qualifier
3	Jersey	0	0	0	0	0	—	
4	Portugal	0	0	0	0	0	—	
5	Scotland	0	0	0	0	0	—	
6	Spain	0	0	0	0	0	—	

First match(es) will be played: 2027. Source:
