= Cameron Shekleton =

South African cricketer (born 2000)

Personal information
- Full name: Cameron Dean Shekleton
- Born: 21 January 2000 (age 26)

International information
- National side: Portugal (2026–present)
- Source: Cricinfo, 11 August 2026

Cameron Shekleton (born 21 January 2000) is a South African-born Portuguese cricketer who plays for the Portugal national cricket team. He made his first-class debut for Gauteng in the 2018–19 CSA 3-Day Provincial Cup on 7 February 2019. He made his List A debut for Gauteng in the 2018–19 CSA Provincial One-Day Challenge on 10 February 2019. In April 2021, he was named in KwaZulu-Natal Inland's squad, ahead of the 2021–22 cricket season in South Africa.

== International career ==
In August 2026, Shekleton was named in Portugal's squad for the 2026 Men's T20 World Cup Europe Sub-regional Qualifier C, which formed part of the qualification pathway for the 2028 Men's T20 World Cup.
