= 2026 Men's T20 World Cup Americas Sub-regional Qualifier B =

Qualification tournament for the 2028 T20WC in Americas region

2026 ICC Men's T20 World Cup Americas Sub-regional Qualifier B
- Dates: 8 – 15 March 2026
- Administrator: ICC Americas
- Cricket format: Twenty20 International
- Tournament format: Double round-robin
- Host: Cayman Islands
- Champions: Cayman Islands
- Runners-up: Argentina
- Participants: 4
- Matches: 12
- Most runs: (Argentina) Pedro Baron (275)
- Most wickets: (Cayman Islands) Romario Edwards (11) (Suriname) Xaviee Smith (11)

The 2026 ICC Men's T20 World Cup Americas Sub-regional Qualifier B was a cricket tournament that formed part of the qualification process for the 2028 Men's T20 World Cup. It was hosted by Cayman Islands in March 2026.

Cayman Islands remained unbeaten throughout the event to finish top of the points table, with the Argentina securing second place. The top two teams of the tournament advanced to the regional final, where they will be joined by Bahamas and Bermuda from sub-regional qualifier A.

Initially, only the winner of the tournament was set to advance to the regional final. However, following a revamp of the qualification structure and a review of the regional qualification pathway in August 2026, the top two teams were granted places in the regional final.

== Squads ==
Argentina	Cayman Islands	Mexico	Suriname
Pedro Barón (c); Guido Angeletti; Franz Bur; Juan Cabrera; Ramiro Escobar (wk); Hernán Fennell; Alejandro Ferguson; Agustin Husain; Manuel Iturbe; Alan Kirschbaum; Agustin Rivero; Ian Roberts; Lucas Rossi; Tomas Rossi	Ramon Sealy (c); Jermaine Baker (wk); Jahmeal Buchanan; Davion Codner; Sacha de Alwis; Vick Dhaniram; Romeo Dunka; Romario Edwards; Sam Foster; Alistair Ifill; Demar Johnson; Akshay Naidoo; Troy Taylor; Adrian Wright; Conroy Wright	Shantanu Kaveri (c); Shoaib Rafiq (vc); Pratik Singh Bais; Amir Butt; Jayanth Byrappa; Devon Eborsohn (wk); Rohit Galgalikar; Sayam Kochar; Kaushal Kumar (wk); Bhargav Narasimha; Dhananjaya Panda; Kashigoud Patil; Shubhang Sharma; Gurpreet Singh	Arun Gokoel (c); Stephan Amirullah; Somnath Bharratt; Yuvraj Dayal; Troy Dudnath; Vejai Hirlall; Khemraj Jaikaran (wk); Joseph Perry (wk); Vishwar Shaw; Gavin Singh; Kishan Singh; Xaviee Smith

== Points table ==
Qualifier B standings
Pos	Team	Pld	W	L	NR	Pts	NRR	Qualification
1	Cayman Islands (H)	6	6	0	0	12	3.560	Advanced to the regional final
2	Argentina	6	4	2	0	8	0.831	Advanced to the regional final
3	Suriname	6	1	5	0	2	−1.387	Eliminated
4	Mexico	6	1	5	0	2	−2.413	Eliminated

Source: ESPNcricinfo
(H) Host

== Fixtures ==
8 March 2026
09:30
Scorecard

Argentina; 98 (17.1 overs)	v	Cayman Islands; 102/0 (9 overs)
Pedro Baron 20 (15); Conroy Wright 4/29 (3.1 overs)		Jermaine Baker 50* (28)

Cayman Islands won by 10 wickets
Jimmy Powell Oval, George Town
Umpires: Jermaine Lindo (USA) and Arnold Maddela (Can)
Player of the match: Conroy Wright (Cay)

- Argentina won the toss and elected to bat.
- Vick Dhaniram (Cay) made his T20I debut.

8 March 2026
14:30
Scorecard

Mexico; 97 (19.5 overs)	v	Suriname; 88/8 (20 overs)
Gurpreet Singh 27 (28); Xaviee Smith 4/18 (4 overs)		Xaviee Smith 18* (20); Gurpreet Singh 2/9 (4 overs)

Mexico won by 9 runs
Jimmy Powell Oval, George Town
Umpires: Aditya Gajjar (USA) and Rohan Shah (Can)
Player of the match: Gurpreet Singh (Mex)

- Suriname won the toss and elected to field.
- Sayam Kochar (Mex), Somnath Bharratt, Joseph Perry and Kishan Singh (Sur) all made their T20I debuts.

9 March 2026
09:30
Scorecard

Argentina; 129/9 (20 overs)	v	Suriname; 114/8 (20 overs)
Pedro Baron 73 (52); Yuvraj Dayal 4/19 (4 overs)		Vishwar Shaw 26 (21); Hernán Fennell 3/26 (4 overs)

Argentina won by 15 runs
Jimmy Powell Oval, George Town
Umpires: Aditya Gajjar (USA) and Arnold Maddela (Can)
Player of the match: Pedro Baron (Arg)

- Argentina won the toss and elected to bat.

9 March 2026
14:30
Scorecard

Mexico; 94/9 (20 overs)	v	Cayman Islands; 95/1 (13.3 overs)
Gurpreet Singh 21 (27); Romario Edwards 5/16 (4 overs)		Jermaine Baker 40 (29); Dhananjaya Panda 1/28 (4 overs)

Cayman Islands won by 9 wickets
Jimmy Powell Oval, George Town
Umpires: Jermaine Lindo (USA) and Rohan Shah (Can)
Player of the match: Romario Edwards (Cay)

- Mexico won the toss and elected to bat.
- Romario Edwards (Cay) became the first player for the Cayman Islands to take a five-wicket haul in T20Is.

11 March 2026
09:30
Scorecard

Suriname; 92/7 (20 overs)	v	Cayman Islands; 96/1 (12.5 overs)
Xaviee Smith 25* (25); Vick Dhaniram 2/8 (4 overs)		Jermaine Baker 40 (29); Yuvraj Dayal 1/22 (3.5 overs)

Cayman Islands won by 9 wickets
Jimmy Powell Oval, George Town
Umpires: Jermaine Lindo (USA) and Arnold Maddela (Can)
Player of the match: Sacha de Alwis (Cay)

- Cayman Islands won the toss and elected to field.

11 March 2026
14:30
Scorecard

Argentina; 153/4 (20 overs)	v	Mexico; 91/7 (20 overs)
Pedro Baron 62 (56); Gurpreet Singh 1/16 (3 overs)		Kashigoud Patil 20 (20); Alan Kirschbaum 2/13 (3 overs)

Argentina won by 62 runs
Jimmy Powell Oval, George Town
Umpires: Aditya Gajjar (USA) and Rohan Shah (Can)
Player of the match: Alan Kirschbaum (Arg)

- Mexico won the toss and elected to field.
- Devon Ebersohn (Mex) made his T20I debut.

12 March 2026
09:30
Scorecard

Cayman Islands; 187/3 (20 overs)	v	Mexico; 94 (19.5 overs)
Ramon Sealy 63 (31); Dhananjaya Panda 2/36 (4 overs)		Kashigoud Patil 37 (35); Romario Edwards 4/15 (4 overs)

Cayman Islands won by 93 runs
Jimmy Powell Oval, George Town
Umpires: Aditya Gajjar (USA) and Arnold Maddela (Can)
Player of the match: Ramon Sealy (Cay)

- Cayman Islands won the toss and elected to bat.
- Shubhang Sharma (Mex) made his T20I debut.

12 March 2026
14:30
Scorecard

Suriname; 107/7 (20 overs)	v	Argentina; 109/3 (17 overs)
Arun Gokoel 34* (37); Lucas Rossi 4/15 (4 overs)		Pedro Baron 54 (36); Xaviee Smith 2/14 (4 overs)

Argentina won by 7 wickets
Jimmy Powell Oval, George Town
Umpires: Jermaine Lindo (USA) and Rohan Shah (Can)
Player of the match: Lucas Rossi (Arg)

- Suriname won the toss and elected to bat.

14 March 2026
09:30
Scorecard

Argentina; 215/3 (20 overs)	v	Mexico; 123 (19.3 overs)
Pedro Baron 65 (38); Pratik Singh Bais 1/11 (2 overs)		Jayanth Byrappa 43 (43); Agustin Rivero 4/17 (4 overs)

Argentina won by 92 runs
Jimmy Powell Oval, George Town
Umpires: Jermaine Lindo (USA) and Arnold Maddela (Can)
Player of the match: Pedro Baron (Arg)

- Argentina won the toss and elected to bat.

14 March 2026
14:30
Scorecard

Suriname; 85/5 (20 overs)	v	Cayman Islands; 86/1 (9.1 overs)
Yuvraj Dayal 37* (30); Adrian Wright 2/6 (4 overs)		Sacha de Alwis 38* (28); Xaviee Smith 1/13 (2 overs)

Cayman Islands won by 9 wickets
Jimmy Powell Oval, George Town
Umpires: Aditya Gajjar (USA) and Rohan Shah (Can)
Player of the match: Sacha de Alwis (Cay)

- Suriname won the toss and elected to bat.
- Stephan Amirullah (Sur) made his T20I debut.

15 March 2026
09:30
Scorecard

Mexico; 126/9 (20 overs)	v	Suriname; 127/6 (20 overs)
Jayanth Byrappa 27 (22); Xaviee Smith 3/15 (4 overs)		Gavin Singh 51* (39); Amir Butt 2/25 (4 overs)

Suriname won by 4 wickets
Jimmy Powell Oval, George Town
Umpires: Jermaine Lindo (USA) and Arnold Maddela (Can)
Player of the match: Gavin Singh (Sur)

- Suriname won the toss and elected to field.

15 March 2026
14:30
Scorecard

Argentina; 114/8 (20 overs)	v	Cayman Islands; 116/4 (17 overs)
Alan Kirschbaum 50 (40); Adrian Wright 4/14 (4 overs)		Jermaine Baker 56 (50); Hernán Fennell 2/28 (4 overs)

Cayman Islands won by 6 wickets
Jimmy Powell Oval, George Town
Umpires: Aditya Gajjar (USA) and Rohan Shah (Can)
Player of the match: Adrian Wright (Cay)

- Argentina won the toss and elected to bat.
