= 2026 Men's T20 World Cup Americas Sub-regional Qualifier A =

Qualification tournament for the 2028 T20WC in Americas region

2026 ICC Men's T20 World Cup Americas Sub-regional Qualifier A
- Dates: 21 – 27 June 2026
- Administrator: ICC Americas
- Cricket format: Twenty20 International
- Tournament format: Single round-robin
- Host: Bermuda
- Champions: Bermuda
- Runners-up: Bahamas
- Participants: 5
- Matches: 10
- Most runs: (Bermuda) Delray Rawlins (190)
- Most wickets: (Bermuda) Derrick Brangman (7)

The 2026 ICC Men's T20 World Cup Americas Sub-regional Qualifier A was a cricket tournament that formed part of the qualification process for the 2028 Men's T20 World Cup. It was hosted by Bermuda in June 2026.

Bermuda remained unbeaten throughout the event to finish top of the points table, with the Bahamas securing second place. The top two teams of the tournament advanced to the regional final, where they will be joined by Cayman Islands and Argentina from sub-regional qualifier B.

Initially, only the winner of the tournament was set to advance to the regional final. However, following a revamp of the qualification structure and a review of the regional qualification pathway in August 2026, the top two teams were granted places in the regional final.

== Squads ==
Bahamas	Belize	Bermuda	Brazil	Panama
Akash Gulati (c); Ahil Amburose; Jonathan Barry; Festus Benn; Turan Brown; Keith Burrows; Renford Davson; Shawn Fowler; Everette Haven; Orville Howell; Gregory Irvin; Julio Jemison (wk); Ricardo Patten; Gregory Taylor; Marc Taylor; Dwight Wheatley	Maurice Castillo (c); Andrew Banner; Gareth Banner; Nathan Banner; Lawrence Bonner; Kenroy Bevans; Roy Broaster; Ordel Casasola; Leon Mcfadzean; Kenthon Moses; Tayshaun Moses; Alexander Oxley; T'shaka Patterson; Greg Scott (wk); Risdon Smith	Terryn Fray (c); Derrick Brangman (vc); Onias Bascome; Zeko Burgess; Amri Ebbin; Luke Horan; Tre Manders; Isaiah O’Brien; Nzari Paynter; Jermal Proctor; Delray Rawlins; Dominic Sabir; Chare Smith; Jonté Smith; Sinclair Smith (wk); Zeri Tomlinson (wk); Charles Trott	Michel Assuncao (c); Luiz Muller (vc); Richard Avery; Luiz Goncalves; Yasar Haroon; Chrystian Machado (wk); Lucas Maximo (wk); William Maximo; Luis Morais; Luiz Gabriel Moras; Riquelmi Nascimento; Gabriel Oliveira; Breno Passoni; Miguel Silva	Anilkumar Ahir (c, wk); Dilip Dahyabhai Ahir; Parth Ahir; Sagar Kumar Ahir; Mahmed Bawa; Abdulla Bhoola; Sohel Desai (wk); Irfan Hafejee; Rizwan Mangera; Ahmed Patel; Faizan Patel; Parth Patel; Mohmad Sohel Patel

== Points table ==
Qualifier A standings
Pos	Team	Pld	W	L	NR	Pts	NRR	Qualification
1	Bermuda (H)	4	3	0	1	7	7.776	Advanced to the regional final
2	Bahamas	4	2	1	1	5	0.255	Advanced to the regional final
3	Panama	4	2	1	1	5	−0.170	Eliminated
4	Belize	4	1	2	1	3	−1.087	Eliminated
5	Brazil	4	0	4	0	0	−3.134	Eliminated

Source: ESPNcricinfo
(H) Host

== Fixtures ==
21 June 2026
10:00
Scorecard

Belize	v	Panama

Match abandoned
White Hill Field, Sandys Parish
Umpires: Zahid Bassarath (WI) and Precious Smith (Ber)

- No toss.
- No play was possible due to rain.

21 June 2026
14:30
Scorecard

Bahamas; 15/1 (2.3 overs)	v	Bermuda
Gregory Taylor 7* (6); Jermal Proctor 1/10 (1.3 overs)

No result
White Hill Field, Sandys Parish
Umpires: Aditya Gajjar (USA) and Paul Manning (Cay)

- Bahamas won the toss and elected to bat.
- No further play was possible due to rain.
- Amari Ebbin, Luke Horan, Isaiah O’Brien (Ber) and Orville Howell (Bah) all made their T20I debuts.

22 June 2026
10:00
Scorecard

Belize; 45/7 (12 overs)	v	Bermuda; 48/0 (5.2 overs)
Alexander Oxley 22 (32); Dominic Sabir 2/4 (1 over)		Onias Bascome 31* (19)

Bermuda won by 10 wickets (DLS method)
White Hill Field, Sandys Parish
Umpires: Zahid Bassarath (WI) and Paul Manning (Cay)
Player of the match: Derrick Brangman (Ber)

- Bermuda won the toss and elected to field.
- Bermuda were set a revised target of 48 runs from 12 overs due to rain.
- Kenroy Bevans, Roy Broaster, Kenthon Moses, Greg Scott and Risdon Smith (Blz) all made their T20I debuts.

22 June 2026
14:30
Scorecard

Panama; 155/4 (20 overs)	v	Brazil; 86/8 (20 overs)
Parth Patel 51 (51); Luiz Muller 1/19 (2 overs)		Luiz Muller 23 (23); Sagar Kumar Ahir 2/8 (2 overs)

Panama won by 69 runs
White Hill Field, Sandys Parish
Umpires: Aditya Gajjar (USA) and Precious Smith (Ber)
Player of the match: Mahmed Bawa (Pan)

- Brazil won the toss and elected to field.
- Sagar Kumar Ahir (Pan) made his T20I debut.

24 June 2026
10:00
Scorecard

Bahamas; 114/5 (20 overs)	v	Panama; 115/6 (16.5 overs)
Marc Taylor 62 (56); Nathan Ingleston 2/13 (4 overs)		Mahmed Bawa 47 (39); Gregory Taylor 2/26 (2.5 overs)

Panama won by 4 wickets
White Hill Field, Sandys Parish
Umpires: Paul Manning (Cay) and Precious Smith (Ber)
Player of the match: Mahmed Bawa (Pan)

- Panama won the toss and elected to field.
- Ahil Amburose (Bah) made his T20I debut.

24 June 2026
14:30
Scorecard

Brazil; 133/9 (20 overs)	v	Belize; 134/2 (17.5 overs)
Luiz Muller 46 (36); Maurice Castillo 3/16 (4 overs)		Alexander Oxley 80* (63); Gabriel Oliveira 2/24 (3 overs)

Belize won by 8 wickets
White Hill Field, Sandys Parish
Umpires: Zahid Bassarath (WI) and Aditya Gajjar (USA)
Player of the match: Alexander Oxley (Blz)

- Brazil won the toss and elected to bat.
- Tayshaun Moses (Blz) and Miguel Silva (Bra) both made their T20I debuts.

25 June 2026
10:00
Scorecard

Panama; 69 (18.5 overs)	v	Bermuda; 73/0 (4.3 overs)
Parth Patel 22 (25); Derrick Brangman 3/9 (3.5 overs)		Delray Rawlins 52* (17)

Bermuda won by 10 wickets
White Hill Field, Sandys Parish
Umpires: Zahid Bassarath (WI) and Aditya Gajjar (USA)
Player of the match: Delray Rawlins (Ber)

- Panama won the toss and elected to bat.

25 June 2026
14:30
Scorecard

Brazil; 111 (20 overs)	v	Bahamas; 113/4 (18.1 overs)
Luiz Muller 28 (22); Festus Benn 3/22 (4 overs)		Renford Davson 26 (26); Luis Morais 2/16 (4 overs)

Bahamas won by 6 wickets
White Hill Field, Sandys Parish
Umpires: Paul Manning (Cay) and Precious Smith (Ber)
Player of the match: Festus Benn (Bah)

- Bahamas won the toss and elected to field.

27 June 2026
10:00
Scorecard

Bahamas; 143/6 (20 overs)	v	Belize; 121/9 (20 overs)
Marc Taylor 51 (52); Maurice Castillo 3/13 (4 overs)		Maurice Castillo 37 (29); Everette Haven 3/12 (2 overs)

Bahamas won by 22 runs
White Hill Field, Sandys Parish
Umpires: Zahid Bassarath (WI) and Precious Smith (Ber)
Player of the match: Marc Taylor (Bah)

- Belize won the toss and elected to field.

27 June 2026
14:30
Scorecard

Bermuda; 220/4 (20 overs)	v	Brazil; 74 (16 overs)
Delray Rawlins 121 (66); Michel Assuncao 1/16 (2 overs)		Gabriel Oliveira 15 (17); Luke Horan 4/13 (4 overs)

Bermuda won by 146 runs
White Hill Field, Sandys Parish
Umpires: Aditya Gajjar (USA) and Paul Manning (Cay)
Player of the match: Delray Rawlins (Ber)

- Bermuda won the toss and elected to bat.
- Nzari Paynter and Zeri Tomlinson (Ber) both made their T20I debuts.
