= 2027 Men's T20 World Cup East Asia-Pacific Regional Final =

Qualifying tournament for the 2028 T20WC

2027 ICC Men's T20 World Cup East Asia-Pacific Regional Final
- Dates: TBD – 2027
- Administrator: ICC East Asia-Pacific
- Cricket format: Round-robin
- Tournament format: Twenty20 International
- Host: TBD
- Participants: 4

The 2027 ICC Men's T20 World Cup East Asia-Pacific Regional Final will be a cricket tournament that will form part of the qualification process for the 2028 Men's T20 World Cup. The winner of the tournament will qualify for the 2028 Men's T20 World Cup Global Qualifier as the region's representatives.

Australia and New Zealand qualified directly for the World Cup as co-hosts.

== Teams and qualification ==
The sub-regional qualifier was contested by nine teams without the number of qualification slots for the regional final having been confirmed. In August 2026, the ICC confirmed the regional qualification pathway, with the regional final set to feature four teams: the top four teams from the sub-regional qualifier.

Teams qualified for the EAP regional final
Method of qualification	Date of qualification	Venue(s)	No. of teams	Qualified teams
EAP Sub-regional Qualifier	18 May 2026	Japan	4	Cook Islands
EAP Sub-regional Qualifier	18 May 2026	Japan	4	Japan
EAP Sub-regional Qualifier	18 May 2026	Japan	4	Papua New Guinea
EAP Sub-regional Qualifier	18 May 2026	Japan	4	Samoa
Total			4	

== Points table ==
Regional final standings
Pos	Team	Pld	W	L	NR	Pts	NRR	Qualification
1	Cook Islands	0	0	0	0	0	—	Advanced to the global qualifier
2	Japan	0	0	0	0	0	—	
3	Papua New Guinea	0	0	0	0	0	—	
4	Samoa	0	0	0	0	0	—	

First match(es) will be played: 2027. Source:
