= 2026 Men's T20 World Cup Europe Sub-regional Qualifier C =

Qualification tournament for the 2028 T20WC in Europe region

2026 ICC Men's T20 World Cup Europe Sub-regional Qualifier C
- Dates: 14 – 21 August 2026
- Administrator: ICC Europe
- Cricket format: Twenty20 International
- Tournament format(s): Group stage and Knockouts
- Host: Finland
- Champions: Portugal
- Runners-up: Spain
- Participants: 10
- Matches: 24
- Player of the series: (Portugal) Sebastian de Oliveira
- Most runs: (Portugal) Moises Henriques (196)
- Most wickets: (Portugal) Sebastian de Oliveira (11)

The 2026 ICC Men's T20 World Cup Europe Sub-regional Qualifier C was a cricket tournament that formed part of the qualification process for the 2028 Men's T20 World Cup. It was hosted by Finland in August 2026.

The winner of the tournament was Portugal who went unbeaten throughout the event and defeated Spain by 57 runs in the final. Both the finalists advanced to the regional final, where they will be joined by Scotland, who were given a bye after having participated in the previous T20 World Cup, along with Jersey and Guernsey from Sub-regional Qualifier A and Denmark from Sub-regional Qualifier B.

Initially, only the winner of the tournament was set to advance to the regional final. However, after a review of the regional qualification pathway in August 2026, the top two teams were granted places in the regional final.

== Squads ==
Bulgaria	Czech Republic	Finland	Germany	Greece
Milen Gogev (c); Manan Bashir; Anthony Dowling; Joshua Dowling; Oscar Duff; Ivan Genchev; Jakob Gul; Kushaal Krishnakumar (wk); Hristo Lakov; Prakash Mishra; Valentin Nikolaev; Dimo Nikolov; Danyal Raja; Ali Rasool; Isa Zaroo	Sahil Grover (c, wk); Ajhar Alam; Sazib Bhuiyan; Joe Cope; Sabawoon Davizi; Ratul Khan (wk); Rhuturaj Magare; Venkatesh Marghashayam; Sojib Miah; Saqlain Mukhtar; Davidson Ramani; Ritik Tomar; Neeraj Tyagi; Sudesh Wickramasekara	Amjad Sher (c); Nicholas Salonen (vc); Faraaz Mehti Abbas; Akhil Arjunan; Madhawa Basnayaka; Zahidullah Kamal; Piumal Karunarathna; Junaid Khan; Aravind Mohan (wk); Faheem Nellancheri (wk); Vanraaj Padhaal; Aniketh Pusthay; Hammadullah Shinwari; Mahesh Tambe	Musaddiq Ahmed (c); Shahid Afridi; Prateek Dabholkar; Adil Khan; Fayaz Khan; Ben Kohler-Cadmore; Jatinder Kumar; Sajid Liaqat; Sachin Mandy (wk); Harmanjot Singh; Ahmad Ullah; Joshua van Heerden; Hamid Wardak; Muslim Yar	Amarpreet Mehmi (c, wk); Christodoulos Bogdanos; Sajid Khan Afridi; Emanuel; Blake Faunce; Georgios Galanis; Andreas Gasteratos; Nikodimos Kavvadias; Sinan Khan; Billy Konstas; Phillipos Nair; Samader Shadab; Dimitrios Triantafillidis; Spyridon Vasilakis
Isle of Man	Israel	Luxembourg	Portugal	Spain
Matthew Ansell; Joseph Burrows; Jacob Butler; Spencer Clarke; Josh Clough; Jerad Griffin; Carl Hartmann (wk); Dollin Jansen; Nathan Knights; Chris Langford; Corbin Liebenberg; Adam McAuley; George Newton; Christian Webster	Shailesh Bangera (c, wk); Eyal Bhonkar; Josh Evans; Ajaykumar Khunti; Benjamin Lazarus; Suboda Mangoda; Joshua Marks; Snir Massil; Niv Nagavkar; Yair Nagavkar; Yogev Nagavkar; Warna Narayana; Gabriel Schachat; Elan Talker	Shiv Gill (c); Timothy Barker (vc); William Cope (wk); Vivek Dixit; Benjamin Embleton; Eliyas Jabarkhel; Asghar Ali Khan; Jatin Madan; Milad Momand; Mayank Nagayach; Navieen Pugalendhi; Kamal Soukhiya; Girish Venkateswaran; Vikram Vijh	Moises Henriques (c); Craig Cachopa; Christopher De Freitas; Sebastian de Oliveira; Edward Fleming; Rahulkumar Hashu; Siraj Ullah Khadem; Hardeep Khuttan; Jeremy Martins; Dhavalkumar Norotam (wk); Jordan Netto; Carlos Nunes; Upen Shantu; Cameron Shekleton	Christian Munoz-Mills (c); Raja Adeel; Yasir Ali; Mohammad Atif; Gurvinder Bajwa; Lorne Burns; Hamza Dar; Alec Davidson Soler (wk); Daniel Doyle-Calle; Sebastian Hughes-Pinan; Mohammad Ihsan (wk); Mohammad Kamran; Atif Mehmood; Charlie Rumistrzewicz

== Germany in Finland ==
11 August 2026
16:30
Scorecard

Germany; 137/8 (18 overs)	v	Finland; 89/6 (16 overs)
Harmanjot Singh 46 (42); Junaid Khan 2/17 (3 overs)		Zahidullah Kamal 44 (39); Prateek Dabholkar 2/10 (3 overs)

Germany won by 30 runs (DLS method)
Kerava National Cricket Ground, Kerava
Umpires: Tharindu Koralage (Fin) and Srinidhi Ravindra (Fin)

- Germany won the toss and elected to bat.
- Finland were set a revised target of 120 runs in 16 overs due to rain.
- Prateek Dabholkar (Ger) made his T20I debut.

== Group stage ==
=== Group A ===
Group A standings
Pos	Team	Pld	W	L	NR	Pts	NRR	Qualification
1	Spain	4	4	0	0	8	4.772	Advanced to the final
2	Finland (H)	4	2	1	1	5	2.321	Advance to the 3rd place play-off
3	Isle of Man	4	2	1	1	5	1.201	Advance to the 5th place play-off
4	Bulgaria	4	1	3	0	2	−4.367	Advanced to the 7th place play-off
5	Luxembourg	4	0	4	0	0	−3.340	Eliminated

Source: Cricinfo
(H) Host

14 August 2026
11:00
Scorecard

Finland; 131/9 (20 overs)	v	Spain; 135/2 (16.4 overs)
Aravind Mohan 57* (46); Charlie Rumistrzewicz 3/18 (4 overs)		Daniel Doyle-Calle 49* (35); Piumal Karunarathna 2/22 (4 overs)

Spain won by 8 wickets
Kerava National Cricket Ground, Kerava
Umpires: Sunil Chandiramani (Gib) and Mandar Sathe (Sui)
Player of the match: Charlie Rumistrzewicz (Esp)

- Spain won the toss and elected to field.

14 August 2026
16:00
Scorecard

Luxembourg; 116 (18.2 overs)	v	Isle of Man; 118/2 (17 overs)
Timothy Barker 44 (29); Matthew Ansell 4/18 (4 overs)		Adam McAuley 50 (41); Kamal Soukhiya 1/18 (4 overs)

Isle of Man won by 8 wickets
Kerava National Cricket Ground, Kerava
Umpires: Sunil Chandiramani (Gib) and Vinay Malhotra (Ger)
Player of the match: Corbin Liebenberg (IoM)

- Isle of Man won the toss and elected to field.

15 August 2026
11:00
Scorecard

Isle of Man; 108/8 (20 overs)	v	Spain; 110/3 (13.3 overs)
Carl Hartmann 27 (34); Atif Mehmood 3/17 (4 overs)		Daniel Doyle-Calle 47* (28); George Newton 2/12 (4 overs)

Spain won by 7 wickets
Tikkurila Cricket Ground, Vantaa
Umpires: Sunil Chandiramani (Gib) and Srinidhi Ravindra (Fin)
Player of the match: Daniel Doyle-Calle (Esp)

- Spain won the toss and elected to field.

15 August 2026
16:00
Scorecard

Finland; 232/9 (20 overs)	v	Bulgaria; 140 (19 overs)
Faheem Nellancheri 37 (13); Danyal Raja 3/38 (4 overs)		Kushaal Krishnakumar 48 (34); Hammadullah Shinwari 5/28 (4 overs)

Finland won by 92 runs
Tikkurila Cricket Ground, Vantaa
Umpires: Sunil Chandiramani (Gib) and Adnan Khan (Esp)
Player of the match: Hammadullah Shinwari (Fin)

- Bulgaria won the toss and elected to field.

17 August 2026
11:00
Scorecard

Isle of Man; 177/7 (20 overs)	v	Bulgaria; 88/8 (20 overs)
Dollin Jansen 86 (48); Prakash Mishra 2/43 (3 overs)		Isa Zaroo 45 (53); Matthew Ansell 4/12 (4 overs)

Isle of Man won by 89 runs
Tikkurila Cricket Ground, Vantaa
Umpires: Vinay Malhotra (Ger) and Srinidhi Ravindra (Fin)
Player of the match: Dollin Jansen (IoM)

- Bulgaria won the toss and elected to field.

17 August 2026
16:00
Scorecard

Spain; 206/6 (20 overs)	v	Luxembourg; 65 (15 overs)
Yasir Ali 64 (45); Jatin Madan 3/27 (4 overs)		Mayank Nagayach 31 (40); Mohammad Kamran 6/20 (4 overs)

Spain won by 141 runs
Tikkurila Cricket Ground, Vantaa
Umpires: Sunil Chandiramani (Gib) and Srinidhi Ravindra (Fin)
Player of the match: Mohammad Kamran (Esp)

- Luxembourg won the toss and elected to field.

18 August 2026
11:00
Scorecard

Finland; 168/9 (20 overs)	v	Luxembourg; 95 (17.2 overs)
Aravind Mohan 52 (37); Kamal Soukhiya 3/35 (4 overs)		William Cope 20 (21); Madhawa Basnayaka 4/27 (4 overs)

Finland won by 73 runs
Tikkurila Cricket Ground, Vantaa
Umpires: Rizwan Akram (Ned) and Sunil Chandiramani (Gib)
Player of the match: Aravind Mohan (Fin)

- Finland won the toss and elected to bat.

18 August 2026
16:00
Scorecard

Bulgaria; 59 (14.4 overs)	v	Spain; 61/1 (4.5 overs)
Milen Gogev 33 (21); Sebastian Hughes-Pinan 2/3 (4 overs)		Christian Munoz-Mills 34* (14); Joshua Dowling 1/23 (2 overs)

Spain won by 9 wickets
Tikkurila Cricket Ground, Vantaa
Umpires: Rizwan Akram (Ned) and Vinay Malhotra (Ger)
Player of the match: Sebastian Hughes-Pinan (Esp)

- Bulgaria won the toss and elected to bat.

20 August 2026
11:00
Scorecard

Bulgaria; 156/6 (20 overs)	v	Luxembourg; 97/4 (14 overs)
Isa Zaroo 33 (30); Eliyas Jabarkhel 3/25 (4 overs)		Asghar Ali Khan 28 (27); Oscar Duff 2/29 (4 overs)

Bulgaria won by 6 runs (DLS method)
Kerava National Cricket Ground, Kerava
Umpires: Rizwan Akram (Ned) and Vinay Malhotra (Ger)
Player of the match: Milen Gogev (Bul)

- Luxembourg won the toss and elected to field.
- No further play was possible due to rain.
- Navieen Pugalendhi (Lux) made his T20I debut.

20 August 2026
16:00
Scorecard

Finland	v	Isle of Man

Match abandoned
Kerava National Cricket Ground, Kerava
Umpires: Sunil Chandiramani (Gib) and Vinay Malhotra (Ger)

- No toss.
- No play was possible due to rain.

=== Group B ===
Group B standings
Pos	Team	Pld	W	L	NR	Pts	NRR	Qualification
1	Portugal	4	4	0	0	8	3.319	Advance to the final
2	Germany	4	3	1	0	6	3.763	Advance to the 3rd place play-off
3	Israel	4	2	2	0	4	−2.732	Advance to the 5th place play-off
4	Czech Republic	4	1	3	0	2	−2.605	Advance to the 7th place play-off
5	Greece	4	0	4	0	0	−2.454	Eliminated

Source: Cricinfo

14 August 2026
11:00
Scorecard

Portugal; 163/4 (20 overs)	v	Israel; 69/9 (20 overs)
Moises Henriques 66* (39); Suboda Mangoda 2/23 (4 overs)		Yair Nagavkar 21 (32); Edward Fleming 3/11 (4 overs)

Portugal won by 94 runs
Tikkurila Cricket Ground, Vantaa
Umpires: Rizwan Akram (Ned) and Adnan Khan (Esp)
Player of the match: Moises Henriques (Por)

- Israel won the toss and elected to field.
- Ajaykumar Khunti, Suboda Mangoda (Isr) and Cameron Shekleton (Por) all made their T20I debuts.
- Moises Henriques played his first T20I for Portugal after having previously played 24 T20Is for Australia, becoming the 26th cricketer to represent two international teams in men's T20Is.

14 August 2026
16:00
Scorecard

Germany; 221/5 (20 overs)	v	Czech Republic; 160/7 (20 overs)
Joshua van Heerden 74 (47); Neeraj Tyagi 2/30 (4 overs)		Sazib Bhuiyan 71 (44); Fayaz Khan 2/11 (1 over)

Germany won by 61 runs
Tikkurila Cricket Ground, Vantaa
Umpires: Adnan Khan (Esp) and Srinidhi Ravindra (Fin)
Player of the match: Fayaz Khan (Ger)

- Germany won the toss and elected to bat.

15 August 2026
11:00
Scorecard

Greece; 147/9 (20 overs)	v	Czech Republic; 148/4 (18.2 overs)
Sajid Khan Afridi 38 (19); Davidson Ramani 4/26 (4 overs)		Sudesh Wickramasekara 38* (18); Blake Faunce 2/29 (4 overs)

Czech Republic won by 6 wickets
Kerava National Cricket Ground, Kerava
Umpires: Vinay Malhotra (Ger) and Mandar Sathe (Sui)
Player of the match: Sudesh Wickramasekara (Cze)

- Greece won the toss and elected to bat.
- Emanuel, Blake Faunce, Billy Konstas and Dimitrios Triantafillithis (Gre) all made their T20I debuts.

15 August 2026
16:00
Scorecard

Germany; 140/9 (20 overs)	v	Portugal; 141/6 (19.2 overs)
Muslim Yar 36 (21); Sebastian de Oliveira 3/20 (4 overs)		Christopher De Freitas 65 (46); Shahid Afridi 1/9 (1 over)

Portugal won by 4 wickets
Kerava National Cricket Ground, Kerava
Umpires: Rizwan Akram (Ned) and Mandar Sathe (Sui)
Player of the match: Christopher De Freitas (Por)

- Portugal won the toss and elected to field.

17 August 2026
11:00
Scorecard

Israel; 94 (19.5 overs)	v	Germany; 95/1 (7.3 overs)
Niv Nagavkar 21 (21); Jatinder Kumar 2/17 (4 overs)		Ben Kohler-Cadmore 53* (26); Elan Talker 1/16 (2 overs)

Germany won by 9 wickets
Kerava National Cricket Ground, Kerava
Umpires: Rizwan Akram (Ned) and Adnan Khan (Esp)
Player of the match: Ben Kohler-Cadmore (Ger)

- Israel won the toss and elected to bat.

17 August 2026
16:00
Scorecard

Greece; 121 (19.3 overs)	v	Portugal; 124/3 (16 overs)
Amarpreet Mehmi 39 (43); Sebastian de Oliveira 4/23 (4 overs)		Cameron Shekleton 52* (34); Amarpreet Mehmi 1/13 (2 overs)

Portugal won by 7 wickets
Kerava National Cricket Ground, Kerava
Umpires: Adnan Khan (Esp) and Mandar Sathe (Sui)
Player of the match: Sebastian de Oliveira (Por)

- Portugal won the toss and elected to field.
- Craig Cachopa (Por) made his T20I debut.

18 August 2026
11:00
Scorecard

Greece; 96 (18.2 overs)	v	Germany; 98/3 (8.1 overs)
Billy Konstas 50* (45); Shahid Afridi 3/8 (2 overs)		Joshua van Heerden 28 (11); Sinan Khan 2/9 (1 over)

Germany won by 7 wickets
Kerava National Cricket Ground, Kerava
Umpires: Adnan Khan (Esp) and Mandar Sathe (Sui)
Player of the match: Joshua van Heerden (Ger)

- Germany won the toss and elected to field.

18 August 2026
16:00
Scorecard

Czech Republic; 154/6 (20 overs)	v	Israel; 155/3 (16 overs)
Sudesh Wickramasekara 40* (13); Ajaykumar Khunti 2/37 (4 overs)		Niv Nagavkar 63* (43); Venkatesh Marghashayam 1/13 (0.3 overs)

Israel won by 7 wickets
Kerava National Cricket Ground, Kerava
Umpires: Srinidhi Ravindra (Fin) and Mandar Sathe (Sui)
Player of the match: Niv Nagavkar (Isr)

- Czech Republic won the toss and elected to bat.

20 August 2026
11:00
Scorecard

Portugal; 211/6 (20 overs)	v	Czech Republic; 24/5 (8.5 overs)
Moises Henriques 111 (51); Ritik Tomar 2/18 (3 overs)		Sazib Bhuiyan 11 (14); Rahulkumar Hashu 2/7 (2 overs)

Portugal won by 91 runs (DLS method)
Tikkurila Cricket Ground, Vantaa
Umpires: Adnan Khan (Esp) and Srinidhi Ravindra (Fin)
Player of the match: Moises Henriques (Por)

- Portugal won the toss and elected to bat.
- No further play was possible due to rain.
- Moises Henriques (Por) scored his first century in T20Is.

20 August 2026
16:00
Scorecard

Israel; 69/5 (8 overs)	v	Greece; 43/3 (5 overs)
Niv Nagavkar 39 (22); Billy Konstas 2/7 (1 over)		Billy Konstas 23* (19); Niv Nagavkar 1/14 (2 overs)

Israel won by 1 run (DLS method)
Tikkurila Cricket Ground, Vantaa
Umpires: Srinidhi Ravindra (Fin) and Mandar Sathe (Sui)
Player of the match: Niv Nagavkar (Isr)

- Greece won the toss and elected to field.
- Greece were set a revised target of 45 runs in 5 overs due to rain.
- Phillipos Nair (Gre) made his T20I debut.

== Play-offs ==
=== 7th place play-off ===
21 August 2026
11:00
Scorecard

Bulgaria; 158 (19.5 overs)	v	Czech Republic; 164/5 (19.2 overs)
Kushaal Krishnakumar 77 (49); Joe Cope 4/30 (4 overs)		Rhuturaj Magare 45 (26); Prakash Mishra 2/21 (4 overs)

Czech Republic won by 5 wickets
Tikkurila Cricket Ground, Vantaa
Umpires: Srinidhi Ravindra (Fin) and Mandar Sathe (Sui)
Player of the match: Rhuturaj Magare (Cze)

- Czech Republic won the toss and elected to field.
- Ivan Genchev (Bul) made his T20I debut.

=== 5th place play-off ===
21 August 2026
16:00
Scorecard

Israel; 88 (18.2 overs)	v	Isle of Man; 89/1 (10.1 overs)
Niv Nagavkar 42 (44); George Newton 3/13 (4 overs)		Adam McAuley 38* (35); Yair Nagavkar 1/24 (2 overs)

Isle of Man won by 9 wickets
Tikkurila Cricket Ground, Vantaa
Umpires: Sunil Chandiramani (Gib) and Srinidhi Ravindra (Fin)
Player of the match: George Newton (IoM)

- Isle of Man won the toss and elected to field.
- Snir Massil (Isr) made his T20I debut.

=== 3rd place play-off ===
21 August 2026
11:00
Scorecard

Germany; 144/7 (20 overs)	v	Finland; 76 (15.4 overs)
Fayaz Khan 51* (34); Piumal Karunarathna 4/23 (4 overs)		Faraaz Mehti Abbas 21 (29); Muslim Yar 4/20 (4 overs)

Germany won by 68 runs
Kerava National Cricket Ground, Kerava
Umpires: Rizwan Akram (Ned) and Adnan Khan (Esp)
Player of the match: Fayaz Khan (Ger)

- Germany won the toss and elected to bat.

=== Final ===
21 August 2026
16:00
Scorecard

Portugal; 160/6 (20 overs)	v	Spain; 103 (17.1 overs)
Christopher De Freitas 39 (36); Yasir Ali 2/24 (4 overs)		Daniel Doyle-Calle 29 (28); Edward Fleming 3/13 (4 overs)

Portugal won by 57 runs
Kerava National Cricket Ground, Kerava
Umpires: Rizwan Akram (Ned) and Vinay Malhotra (Ger)
Player of the match: Edward Fleming (Por)

- Spain won the toss and elected to field.
