= 2027 Men's T20 World Cup Americas Regional Final =

Qualifying tournament for the 2028 T20WC

2027 ICC Men's T20 World Cup Americas Regional Final
- Dates: 21 – 31 October 2027
- Administrator: ICC Americas
- Cricket format: Twenty20 International
- Tournament format: Double round-robin
- Host: Cayman Islands
- Participants: 4

The 2027 ICC Men's T20 World Cup Americas Regional Final will be a cricket tournament that will form part of the qualification process for the 2028 Men's T20 World Cup. The winner will join Canada and United States as America's representatives at the 2028 Men's T20 World Cup Global Qualifier.

West Indies qualified directly for the World Cup as one of the top eight teams from the previous edition.

== Teams and qualification ==
The tournament will feature four teams, consisting of the top two sides from each sub-regional qualifier.

Method of qualification	Date	Venue(s)	No. of teams	Team
Americas Qualifier A	28 June 2026	Bermuda	2	Bahamas
Americas Qualifier A	28 June 2026	Bermuda	2	Bermuda
Americas Qualifier B	15 March 2026	Cayman Islands	2	Argentina
Americas Qualifier B	15 March 2026	Cayman Islands	2	Cayman Islands
Total			4	

== Points table ==
Regional final standings
Pos	Team	Pld	W	L	NR	Pts	NRR	Qualification
1	Argentina	0	0	0	0	0	—	Advance to the global qualifier
2	Bahamas	0	0	0	0	0	—	
3	Bermuda	0	0	0	0	0	—	
4	Cayman Islands (H)	0	0	0	0	0	—	

First match(es) will be played: 21 October 2027. Source:
(H) Host
