= Men's T20 World Cup Global Qualifier =

International cricket competition

ICC Men's T20 World Cup Global Qualifier
- Administrator: International Cricket Council
- Format: Twenty20 International; Twenty20 (2008–2015)
- First edition: 2008: Ireland
- Latest edition: 2022 A: Oman; 2022 B: Zimbabwe
- Next edition: 2028: TBA
- Tournament format: see below
- Number of teams: 16
- Current champion: A: United Arab Emirates (1st title); B: Zimbabwe (1st title)
- Most successful: Ireland; Netherlands (3 titles each)
- Most runs: (Afghanistan) Mohammad Shahzad (895)
- Most wickets: (Netherlands) Mudassar Bukhari (39)

The ICC Men's T20 World Cup Global Qualifier, formerly the ICC World Twenty20 Qualifier (2008–2015) and the ICC Men's T20 World Cup Qualifier (2019), is a biennial international cricket competition in Twenty20 International (T20I) format (formerly in a hybrid Twenty20 format until 2015), organised by the International Cricket Council (ICC). It was held in every even year from 2008 to 2012, every odd year from 2013 to 2019 with the exception of 2017 which was cancelled, and since 2022 it has been held in every even year with the exception of 2024 and 2026 when it was discontinued.

The tournament was introduced in 2007 as the final stage of the qualification process for the ICC Men's T20 World Cup, formerly the ICC World Twenty20 (2007–2016). The 2018 World Twenty20 was cancelled, and thus, no qualifier took place in 2017. In 2022, two separate tournaments were held, each featuring 8 different teams. After 2022, the tournament was discontinued with the top teams from the regional qualifiers advancing directly to the T20 World Cup. However, it will be reintroduced from 2028 onwards.

As of 2022, seven editions have been played; a total of 24 teams have competed and six teams have won the tournament. Ireland (2008, 2012, 2013) and the Netherlands (2008, 2015, 2019) are the joint-most successful teams with three titles each. Afghanistan (2010), Scotland (2015), the United Arab Emirates (2022 A) and Zimbabwe (2022 B) have one title each. Five countries have hosted the tournament. The United Arab Emirates and Zimbabwe are the current champions, having won their maiden titles in the 2022 edition. The next edition of the tournament will take place in 2028.

== History ==
=== Background ===
In 2003, the England and Wales Cricket Board (ECB) introduced a 20-over per innings game to the county cricket. The first official Twenty20 matches were played on 13 June 2003 between the English counties in the T20 Blast's inaugural edition. The first official Women's Twenty20 matches were played on 29 May 2004 as part of the 2004 Super Fours. The first Twenty20 match held at Lord's, on 15 July 2004 between Middlesex and Surrey, attracted a crowd of 26,500, the largest attendance for any county cricket game at the ground since 1953. The first full international women's Twenty20 match was played on 5 August 2004 between England and New Zealand at County Cricket Ground in Hove. The first full international men's Twenty20 match was played on 17 February 2005 between Australia and New Zealand at Eden Park in Auckland. The game was played in a light-hearted manner.

Soon after, the International Cricket Council (ICC) adapted the T20I format and introduced the ICC Men's T20 World Cup (then known as the ICC World Twenty20) in 2007, followed by the ICC Women's T20 World Cup (then known as the ICC Women's World Twenty20) in 2009. In December 2007, A separate qualifier event (later renamed as "Global Qualifier") for the men's tournament was announced and was introduced from the 2009 edition onwards.

=== Initial years (2008–2010) ===
The inaugural qualifier was held in August 2008 in Ireland featuring 6 teams with the top 3 teams qualifying for the 2009 World Twenty20. However, the final match of the qualifier was abandoned due to rain and the title was shared between Ireland and the Netherlands. The second qualifier was held in February 2010 in the United Arab Emirates featuring 8 teams with the top 2 teams qualifying for the 2010 World Twenty20.

=== Pathway expansions (2012–2015) ===
For 2012, an expanded qualification pathway including a series of regional qualifiers was introduced for the men's tournament. The third qualifier was held in March 2012 in the United Arab Emirates featuring 16 teams with the top 3 teams qualifying for the 2012 World Twenty20. For 2013, both global and regional qualifiers were introduced as parts of the women's qualification pathway as well. The fourth men's qualifier was held in November 2013 in the United Arab Emirates featuring 16 teams with the top 6 teams qualifying for the 2014 World Twenty20; as it also expanded to feature 16 teams. The fifth qualifier was held in July 2015 in Ireland and Scotland featuring 14 teams with the top 6 teams qualifying for the 2016 World Twenty20. The final match of the 2015 qualifier was abandoned due to rain and the title was shared between the Netherlands and Scotland.

=== Disruptions and rebranding (2017–2019) ===
In May 2016, the ICC proposed a World Twenty20 tournament in 2018, with South Africa being the possible host, but this was later dropped as the top member nations were busy with multiple bilateral tour matches that year. In November 2018, as part of a goal to heighten the profile of the World Twenty20 tournaments, the ICC announced that they would be rebranded as the "T20 World Cup" beginning in 2020. The sixth qualifier was held in October to November 2019 in the United Arab Emirates featuring 14 teams with the top 6 teams qualifying for the 2021 T20 World Cup.

=== Discontinuation (2022–2026) ===
The seventh qualifier (now named the "Global Qualifier") was held as two separate tournaments: Global Qualifier A in February 2022 in Oman and Global Qualifier B in July 2022 in Zimbabwe; each featured 8 teams with the top 2 teams from each qualifying for the 2022 T20 World Cup. As the T20 World Cup expanded to feature 20 teams from the 2024 T20 World Cup onwards, the ICC announced that the Global Qualifier would be discontinued with the top 8 teams from the regional qualifiers directly qualifying for the T20 World Cup. Same pathway was retained for the 2026 T20 World Cup as well.

=== Reintroduction (2028 onwards) ===
In July 2026, the ICC announced that an expanded Global Qualifier would be reintroduced from 2028 onwards. It will feature 16 teams with the top 8 teams qualifying for the 2028 T20 World Cup.

== Hosts ==
Summary of hosts by ICC region (2008–2022) (Note: References for tournament hosts: 2008, 2010, 2012, 2013, 2015, 2019, 2022 A, 2022 B)
Region	Year	Hosting body	Host(s)
Africa	2022 B	Zimbabwe Cricket	Zimbabwe
Asia	2010	Emirates Cricket Board	United Arab Emirates
Asia	2012	Emirates Cricket Board	United Arab Emirates
Asia	2013	Emirates Cricket Board	United Arab Emirates
Asia	2019	Emirates Cricket Board	United Arab Emirates
Asia	2022 A	Oman Cricket	Oman
Europe	2008	Cricket Ireland	Ireland
Europe	2015	Cricket Ireland; Cricket Scotland	Ireland; Scotland

Host countries of Men's T20 World Cup Global Qualifier

== Format ==
=== Qualification ===
For the first two tournaments, top teams from the World Cricket League (WCL) were given qualification. Since 2012, top-performing teams from the previous cycle that didn't receive direct qualification to the T20 World Cup have played in the Global Qualifier along with teams advancing from the regional qualifiers. (Note: References for qualification formats: 2008, 2010, 2012, 2013, 2015, 2019, 2022 A, 2022 B, 2028)

Summary of the qualification for Global Qualifier (2008–2028)
#	Year	Teams	Directly qualified			WCL	Regional qualifiers				
#	Year	Teams	Host(s)	Previous tournament	T20I Rankings	WCL	Africa	Americas	Asia	East Asia-Pacific	Europe
1	2008	6	—N/a			6	—N/a				
2	2010	8	—N/a			8	—N/a				
3	2012	16	—N/a	—N/a	3	—N/a	3	3	4	1	2
4	2013	16	1	6	—N/a	—N/a	2	2	2	1	2
5	2015	14	2	5	—N/a	—N/a	2	2	1	1	1
6	2019	14	1	—N/a	5	—N/a	3	2	1	1	1
7	2022 A	8	—N/a	2	2	—N/a	0	1	1	1	1
7	2022 B	8	—N/a	2	2	—N/a	1	1	1	0	1
8	2028	16	—N/a	8	—N/a	—N/a	2	1	2	1	2

=== Tournament ===
The tournament is primarily held in two stages. The preliminary stage, or group stage, features 2 groups of 3 (2008), 4 (2010, 2022), 7 (2015–2019), 8 (2012–2013) teams or 4 groups of 4 teams (2028) in a round-robin format. The second stage had two sub-stages: shield stage and final stage. The top 2 (2010), 4 (2008, 2022) or 6 (2012–2019) teams from the preliminary stage advanced to the final stage, a knockout stage, while the bottom teams played in the shield stage, a repechage stage with consolation playoffs. In 2010, instead of the shield stage a Super stage, a round-robin stage of 4 teams known as the Super 4 stage was held. Since 2028, the second stage is played as a knockout stage of 8 teams. (Note: References for tournament formats: 2008, 2010, 2012, 2013, 2015, 2019, 2022, 2028)

In case of a tie (that is, both teams scoring the same number of runs at the end of their respective innings), a Super Over is used to decide the winner since 2009. In the case of a tie occurring again in the Super Over, subsequent Super Overs would be played until there is a winner. Prior to 2019, the match would be won by the team that had scored the most boundaries in their innings. Until 2015, the tournament was played in a hybrid format: only the matches involving an associate team with T20I status had international status and were considered as T20I matches, while other matches were played as T20 matches without international status. In April 2018, the ICC announced that all member teams would be awarded full T20I status from January 2019 onwards and since then, the tournament is played with full T20I status.

Summary of tournament formats (2008–2022)
#	Year	Teams	Matches	Preliminary stage	Super stage	Shield stage	Final stage
1	2008	6	11	2 groups of 3 teams: 6 matches	—N/a	Repechage of 2 teams: 1 match	Knockout of 4 teams: 4 matches
2	2010	8	17	2 groups of 4 teams: 12 matches	Super 4 stage 4 teams with PCF: 4 matches	—N/a	Knockout of 2 teams: 1 match
3	2012	16	72	2 groups of 8 teams: 56 matches	—N/a	Repechage of 10 teams: 9 matches	Playoff of 6 teams: 7 matches
4	2013	16	72	2 groups of 8 teams: 56 matches	—N/a	Repechage of 10 teams: 9 matches	Playoff of 6 teams: 7 matches
5	2015	14	51	2 groups of 7 teams: 42 matches	—N/a	Repechage of 4 teams: 3 matches	Knockout of 6 teams: 6 matches
6	2019	14	51	2 groups of 7 teams: 42 matches	—N/a	Repechage of 4 teams: 3 matches	Knockout of 6 teams: 6 matches
7	2022 A	8	20	2 groups of 4 teams: 12 matches	—N/a	Repechage of 4 teams: 4 matches	Knockout of 4 teams: 4 matches
7	2022 B	8	20	2 groups of 4 teams: 12 matches	—N/a	Repechage of 4 teams: 4 matches	Knockout of 4 teams: 4 matches
8	2028	16	31	4 groups of 4 teams: 24 matches	—N/a		Knockout of 8 teams: 7 matches

== Summary ==
Details of Men's T20 World Cup Global Qualifier tournaments
#	Year	Dates	Host(s)	Venues	Ref.
1	2008	2 – 5 August 2008	Cricket Ireland	1 in Ireland	
2	2010	9 – 13 February 2010	Emirates Cricket Board	2 in the United Arab Emirates	
3	2012	13 – 24 March 2012	Emirates Cricket Board	5 in the United Arab Emirates	
4	2013	15 – 30 November 2013	Emirates Cricket Board	6 in the United Arab Emirates	
5	2015	6 – 26 July 2015	Cricket Ireland; Cricket Scotland	4 in Ireland; 4 in Scotland	
6	2019	18 October – 2 November 2019	Emirates Cricket Board	5 in the United Arab Emirates	
7	2022 A	18 – 24 February 2022	Oman Cricket	2 in Oman	
7	2022 B	11 – 17 July 2022	Zimbabwe Cricket	2 in Zimbabwe	
8	2028	TBA	TBA	TBA	

=== Final results ===
Details of Men's T20 World Cup Global Qualifier finals
Year	Final				Ref.
Year	Date & venue	Winner	Victory margin	Runner-up	Ref.
2008	5 August 2008; Civil Service Cricket Club Ground, Belfast	Ireland; Netherlands	No result	—N/a	
2010	13 February 2010; Dubai International Cricket Stadium, Dubai	Afghanistan; 147/2 (17.3 overs)	8 wickets	Ireland; 142/8 (20 overs)	
2012	24 March 2012; Dubai International Cricket Stadium, Dubai	Ireland; 156/5 (18.5 overs)	5 wickets	Afghanistan; 152/7 (20 overs)	
2013	30 November 2013; Sheikh Zayed Cricket Stadium, Abu Dhabi	Ireland; 225/7 (20 overs)	68 runs	Afghanistan; 157 (18.5 overs)	
2015	26 July 2015; Malahide Cricket Ground, Dublin	Netherlands; Scotland	No result	—N/a	
2019	2 November 2019; Dubai International Cricket Stadium, Dubai	Netherlands; 134/3 (19 overs)	7 wickets	Papua New Guinea; 128/8 (20 overs)	
2022 A	24 February 2022; Oman Cricket Academy Ground Turf 1, Muscat	United Arab Emirates; 160/3 (18.4 overs)	7 wickets	Ireland; 159 (20 overs)	
2022 B	17 July 2022; Queens Sports Club, Bulawayo	Zimbabwe; 132 (19.3 overs)	37 runs	Netherlands; 95 (18.2 overs)	

== Team performances ==
As of the 2022 B tournament, 24 teams have played in the Global Qualifier, but only two teams (Canada and the Netherlands) have competed in every tournament. Six teams have won the tournament; Ireland (2008, 2012, 2013) and the Netherlands (2008, 2015, 2019) have won the tournament three times each, Afghanistan (2010), Scotland (2015), the United Arab Emirates (2022 A) and Zimbabwe (2022 B) have won it once each. Ireland have made five final appearances and six semi-final appearances. The best performance by a host team is winners by Ireland in 2008, Scotland in 2015 and Zimbabwe in 2022 B. Zimbabwe also have the highest victory percentage in Global Qualifier matches (100%).

=== By tournament ===
An overview of the teams' performances in every Global Qualifier is given below.

Legend

- W Winners
- RU Runners-up
- 3rd 3rd place
- 4th 4th place
- R2 Super stage (2010)
- R1 Preliminary round (group stage)
- Q Qualified
- × Withdrew
- ×× Ineligible (suspended)
- * Hosts
- ↑ Advanced to the respective ICC Men's T20 World Cup
- § Directly qualified for the respective ICC Men's T20 World Cup

† denotes current Test playing nations / ICC full members.

Team performances in each Men's T20 World Cup Global Qualifier tournament
Edition (No. of teams)	2008 (6)	2010 (8)	2012 (16)	2013 (16)	2015 (14)	2019 (14)	2022 (A • B) (16)	2028 (16)	Apps
Location(s) Team	(Ireland)	(United Arab Emirates)	(United Arab Emirates)	(United Arab Emirates)	(Ireland) (Scotland)	(United Arab Emirates)	(Oman) (Zimbabwe)	(To be determined)	Apps
Afghanistan† (Note: Afghanistan and Ireland became full members in June 2017.)	—N/a	W↑	RU↑	RU↑	R1↑	§	§	§	4
Bahrain	—N/a	—N/a	—N/a	—N/a	—N/a	—N/a	R1		1
Bermuda	R1	—N/a	R1	R1	—N/a	R1	—N/a		4
Canada	R1	R1	R1	R1	R1	R1	R1	Q	7
Denmark	—N/a	—N/a	R1	R1	—N/a	—N/a	—N/a		2
Germany	—N/a	—N/a	—N/a	—N/a	—N/a	—N/a	R1		1
Hong Kong	—N/a	—N/a	R1	R1↑	4th↑	R1	R1		5
Ireland†	W*↑	RU↑	W↑	W↑	3rd*↑	3rd↑	RU↑	§	7
Italy	—N/a	—N/a	R1	R1	—N/a	—N/a	—N/a	Q	2
Jersey	—N/a	—N/a	—N/a	—N/a	R1	R1	R1		3
Kenya	4th	R1	R1	R1	R1	R1	—N/a		6
Namibia	—N/a	—N/a	3rd	R1	R1	4th↑	§	Q	4
Nepal	—N/a	—N/a	R1	3rd↑	R1	—N/a	3rd	Q	4
Netherlands	W↑	R2	4th	R1↑	W↑	W↑	RU↑	Q	7
Nigeria	—N/a	—N/a	—N/a	—N/a	—N/a	R1 (Note: Zimbabwe was suspended from July to October 2019 by the ICC due to government interference and Nigeria replaced them in the 2019 Global Qualifier.)	—N/a		1
Oman	—N/a	—N/a	R1	—N/a	R1↑	R1↑	4th*	Q	4
Papua New Guinea	—N/a	—N/a	R1	R1	R1	RU↑	3rd		5
Philippines	—N/a	—N/a	—N/a	—N/a	—N/a	—N/a	R1		1
Scotland	3rd↑ (Note: Zimbabwe withdrew from the 2009 World Twenty20 due to the political issues related to Robert Mugabe and were replaced by a third team from the Global Qualifier: Scotland.)	R1	R1	R1	W*↑	R1↑	§		6
Singapore	—N/a	—N/a	—N/a	—N/a	—N/a	R1	R1		2
Uganda	—N/a	—N/a	R1	R1	—N/a	—N/a	R1		3
United Arab Emirates	—N/a	R2*	—*	4th*↑	R1	R1*	W↑	Q	5
United States	—N/a	R1	R1	R1	R1	—N/a	4th	Q	5
Zimbabwe†	×	§	§	§	§	××	W*↑	§	1
Ref.									

=== Overall ===
The table below provides a summary of the performances of teams over past Global Qualifiers.

† denotes current Test playing nations / ICC full members.

Overall team performances in Men's T20 World Cup Global Qualifier tournaments
Team (Note: Teams are ordered by their best performance, then winning percentage, then (if equal) by alphabetical order.)	Apps	Mat	Won	Lost	Tied (W/L)	N/R	Win % (Note: Excluding no result matches)	Best performance
Ireland†	7	49	37	11	0 (0/0)	1	77.08	Winners (2008, 2012, 2013)
Netherlands	7	50	37	12	0 (0/0)	1	75.51	Winners (2008, 2015, 2019)
Zimbabwe†	1	5	5	0	0 (0/0)	0	100.00	Winners (2022 B)
Afghanistan†	4	31	25	6	0 (0/0)	0	80.64	Winners (2010)
Scotland	6	41	23	18	0 (0/0)	0	56.09	Winners (2015)
United Arab Emirates	5	33	18	15	0 (0/0)	0	54.54	Winners (2022 A)
Papua New Guinea	5	37	19	18	0 (0/0)	0	51.35	Runners-up (2019)
Namibia	4	35	19	15	0 (0/0)	1	55.88	Semi-finals (2012, 2019)
Nepal	4	30	16	13	0 (0/0)	1	55.17	Semi-finals (2013, 2022 A)
Hong Kong	5	38	19	19	0 (0/0)	0	50.00	Semi-finals (2015)
Kenya	6	35	16	19	0 (0/0)	0	45.71	Semi-finals (2008)
Oman	4	29	12	17	0 (0/0)	0	41.37	Semi-finals (2022 A)
United States	5	30	11	19	0 (0/0)	0	36.66	Semi-finals (2022 B)
Canada	7	39	15	24	0 (0/0)	0	38.46	First round (2008, 2010, 2012, 2013, 2015, 2019, 2022 A)
Bermuda	4	26	4	22	0 (0/0)	0	15.38	First round (2008, 2012, 2013, 2019)
Jersey	3	17	7	10	0 (0/0)	0	41.17	First round (2015, 2019, 2022 B)
Uganda	3	21	7	14	0 (0/0)	0	33.33	First round (2012, 2013, 2022 B)
Italy	2	17	6	11	0 (0/0)	0	35.29	First round (2012, 2013)
Singapore	2	11	2	9	0 (0/0)	0	18.18	First round (2019, 2022 B)
Denmark	2	15	1	14	0 (0/0)	0	6.66	First round (2012, 2013)
Bahrain	1	5	3	2	0 (0/0)	0	60.00	First round (2022 A)
Germany	1	5	1	4	0 (0/0)	0	20.00	First round (2022 A)
Nigeria	1	6	0	6	0 (0/0)	0	0.00	First round (2019)
Philippines	1	5	0	5	0 (0/0)	0	0.00	First round (2022 A)
As of 2022 Men's T20 World Cup Global Qualifier B Source: Cricinfo

=== Debutant teams by tournament ===
† denotes Test playing nations / ICC full members at that time.

Debutant teams in each Men's T20 World Cup Global Qualifier tournament
Year	Debutant teams			Total
2008	Bermuda	Canada	Ireland	6
2008	Kenya	Netherlands	Scotland	6
2010	Afghanistan	United Arab Emirates	United States	3
2012	Denmark	Hong Kong	Italy	8
2012	Namibia	Nepal	Oman	8
2012	Papua New Guinea		Uganda	8
2013	—N/a			0
2015	Jersey			1
2019	Nigeria	Singapore		2
2022 A	Bahrain	Germany	Philippines	3
2022 B	Zimbabwe†			1
2028	TBA			TBA
Total				24

== Records ==
As of the 2022 B tournament, Kevin O'Brien and Gary Wilson of Ireland hold the record for most appearances in Global Qualifier matches (44), while William Porterfield of Ireland holds the record for the most Global Qualifier matches as a captain (36). Sheikh Zayed Cricket Stadium in Abu Dhabi, United Arab Emirates, has hosted the most Global Qualifier matches (50). Singaporean umpire Sarika Prasad has umpired the most Global Qualifier matches (32). A total of ten centuries and thirty-eight 100-run partnerships have been scored while, 14 five-wicket hauls and 75 four-wicket hauls have been taken in the tournaments. Paul Stirling of Ireland holds the record for most runs (1223), and Matt Machan of Scotland holds the record for most runs in a tournament (364 in 2013). Bernard Scholtz of Namibia holds the record for most wickets (44), and Ahsan Malik of the Netherlands holds the record for most wickets in a tournament (21 in 2013). Gary Wilson also holds the record for most dismissals by a wicket-keeper (33) and George Dockrell of Ireland holds the record for most catches by a fielder (26).

=== Overall records ===
Team records
Record for	Record holder	Record	Tournament(s)	Ref.
Highest team total	Zimbabwe (v Singapore) at Bulawayo	236/5	2022 B	
Lowest team total	Philippines (v Oman) at Al Amerat	36/10	2022 A	
Highest match aggregate	Scotland v Afghanistan at Edinburgh	383/15	2015	
Lowest match aggregate	Oman v Philippines at Al Amerat	76/11	2022 A	

Batting records
Record for	Record holder	Record	Tournament(s)	Ref.
Most runs	(Ireland) Paul Stirling	1223	2010 – 2022 A	
Most runs in a tournament	(Scotland) Matt Machan	364	2013	
Highest score	(Ireland) William Porterfield (v United States) at Abu Dhabi	127*	2013	
Most centuries	10 players	1	2012 – 2022 B	
Highest partnership	(Nepal) Kushal Bhurtel & Dipendra Singh Airee (v Philippines) at Al Amerat	171	2022 A	

Bowling records
Record for	Record holder	Record	Tournament(s)	Ref.
Most wickets	(Namibia) Bernard Scholtz	44	2013 – 2019	
Most wickets in a tournament	(Netherlands) Ahsan Malik	21	2013	
Best bowling figures	(Denmark) Aftab Ahmed (v Papua New Guinea) at Abu Dhabi	6/22	2012	
Most four-wicket hauls	9 players	2	2008 – 2019	
Most five-wicket hauls	14 players	1	2010 – 2022 B	

Fielding records
Record for	Record holder	Record	Tournament(s)	Ref.
Most wicket-keeper dismissals	(Ireland) Gary Wilson	33	2008 – 2019	
Most wicket-keeper dismissals in a tournament	(Oman) Sultan Ahmed	14	2015	
Most catches	(Ireland) George Dockrell	26	2010 – 2022 A	
Most catches in a tournament	(Ireland) George Dockrell	10	2013	

=== Tournament records ===
Records by tournament
Edition	Most runs	Most wickets	Ref.
2008	(Scotland) Ryan Watson (100)	(Scotland) Dewald Nel (9)	
2010	(Ireland) Niall O'Brien (188)	(Afghanistan) Mohammad Nabi (13)	
2012	(Ireland) Paul Stirling (357)	(Afghanistan) Dawlat Zadran (17) (Scotland) Majid Haq (17)	
2013	(Scotland) Matt Machan (364)	(Netherlands) Ahsan Malik (21)	
2015	(Namibia) Stephan Baard (309)	(Ireland) John Mooney (14) (Namibia) Bernard Scholtz (14) (Scotland) Alasdair Evans (14)	
2019	(Ireland) Paul Stirling (291)	(Oman) Bilal Khan (18)	
2022 A	(United Arab Emirates) Vriitya Aravind (267)	(Nepal) Sandeep Lamichhane (12)	
2022 B	(United States) Steven Taylor (233)	(Netherlands) Logan van Beek (11)	

== See also ==
- Women's T20 World Cup
- Women's T20 World Cup Global Qualifier
