= 2026 Men's T20 World Cup Europe Sub-regional Qualifier B =

Qualification tournament for the 2028 T20WC in Europe region

2026 ICC Men's T20 World Cup Europe Sub-regional Qualifier B
- Dates: 8 – 14 July 2026
- Administrator: ICC Europe
- Cricket format: Twenty20 International
- Tournament format(s): Group stage and knockouts
- Host: Denmark
- Champions: Denmark
- Runners-up: Romania
- Participants: 9
- Matches: 20
- Player of the series: (Denmark) Hamid Shah
- Most runs: (Denmark) Hamid Shah (326)
- Most wickets: (Romania) Irfan Ringku (10)

The 2026 ICC Men's T20 World Cup Europe Sub-regional Qualifier B was a cricket tournament that formed part of the qualification process for the 2028 Men's T20 World Cup. It was played in Denmark in July 2026.

The winner of the tournament was Denmark who went unbeaten throughout the event and defeated Romania by six runs in the final. They advanced to the regional final, where they were joined by Scotland who was given a bye after having participated in the previous T20 World Cup, along with Jersey and Guernsey from Sub-regional Qualifier A, Portugal and Spain from Sub-regional Qualifier C.

Scotland had been initially drawn to play in Qualifier B, as they had originally not qualified for the World Cup, but after replacing Bangladesh due to their withdrawal, Scotland were given the bye to the regional final.

== Venues ==
Venues in Denmark
A map of Denmark with the 2026 Men's T20 World Cup Europe Sub-regional Qualifier B venues
Brøndby	Køge
Svanholm Park	Koge Cricket Club
Capacity: N/A	Capacity: N/A
Matches: 10	Matches: 10

== Squads ==
Belgium	Denmark	Estonia	Gibraltar	Hungary
Sheraz Sheikh (c); Khalid Ahmadi; Ahmad Khalid Ahmadzai; Sajad Ahmadzai; Shaheryar Butt (wk); Omid Malik Khel; Aziz Mohammad; Burhan Niaz; Ali Raza (wk); Walid Sahibzada; Shagharai Sefat; Zaki Shah; Ravi Thapliyal; Saber Zakhil	Hamid Shah (c); Taranjit Bharaj (wk); Saif Ahmad (vc); Lucky Ali; Surya Anand; Mustakim Aslam; Sebastian Heath (wk); Eshan Karimi; Abdullah Mahmood; Saud Munir; Musa Shaheen; Nicholas Sonne-Rudd; Simon Sorensen; Shangeev Thanikaithasan	Arslan Amjad (c); Harri Aggarwal; Rohan Aggarwal; Zeeshan Ali; Sahil Chauhan; Steffan Gooch; Habib Khan; Bilal Masud; Aditya Panwar; Henri Pattenden; Aditya Paul; Rudesh Sekaran (wk); Ashraful Shuvo; Kalle Vislapuu	Kieron Ferrary (c, wk); Louis Bruce (vc); Samarth Bodha; James Fitzgerald; Alexander Hillman; Anthony Hillman; Jack Horrocks; Iain Latin; Kabir Mirpuri; Avinash Pai; Chris Pyle (wk); Mohamed Roshan; Kayron Stagno (wk); Matthew Walker	Vinoth Ravindran (c); Abbas Ghani (vc); Kasir Ahmed; Matthew Ainsworth; Robert Ainsworth; Maaz Bhaiji (wk); Amal Jacob; Zoltan Marosy; Sandeep Mohandas; Zahir Mohammed; Ali Nawaz; Muhammad Saqlain; Muhammad Soban; Kamran Wahid
Norway	Romania	Serbia	Turkey	
Khizer Ahmed (c, wk); Kuruge Abeyrathna (wk); Chaudhary Akram; Muhammad Butt; Walid Ghauri; Saif-Ul Islam; Ibrahim Rahimi; Qamar Mushtaque; Hayatullah Niazi; Vinay Ravi; Faisal Raza; Sher Sahak; Wahidullah Sahak; Ahmadullah Shinwari	Vasu Saini (c); Adrian Lascu (vc); Avishka Chandrasiri; Janitha Fernando; Josak Khadka; Rameez Khan; Manmeet Koli; Rohit Kumar (wk); Ariyan Mohammed (wk); Luca Petre; Irfan Ringku; Tharindu Sandaruwan; Ramesh Satheesan; Taranjeet Singh	Mark Pavlovic (c); Braithyn Pecic (vc); Wintley Burton (wk); Alexander Dizija; Bogdan Dugic; Leslie Dunbar (wk); Milan Janicijevic; Matthew Kostic; Aleksa Lazic; Peter Nedeljkovic; Sachin Shinde; Slobodan Tosic; Luka Woods; Nemanja Zimonjic; Vukasin Zimonjic	Muhammad Fahad (c); Ali Turkmen; Ilyas Ataullah; Mertcan Donmez; Mustafa Balkis; Serdar Burak Emir; Ishak Elec; Mertcan Filiz (wk); Abdullah Khan Lodhi; Ibrahim Kursad Dalyan; Omer Kutuk (wk); Mecit Ozturk; Furkan Tuskan; Murat Yilmaz	

== Group stage ==
=== Group A ===
Group A standings
Pos	Team	Pld	W	L	NR	Pts	NRR	Qualification
1	Romania	3	3	0	0	6	1.319	Advanced to the final
2	Belgium	3	2	1	0	4	1.494	Advanced to the 3rd place play-off
3	Gibraltar	3	1	2	0	2	−0.562	Advanced to the 5th place play-off
4	Serbia	3	0	3	0	0	−2.392	Advanced to the 7th place play-off

Source: ESPNcricinfo

8 July 2026
10:30
Scorecard

Gibraltar; 139/8 (20 overs)	v	Belgium; 142/3 (15.4 overs)
Kayron Stagno 54 (34); Khalid Ahmadi 3/19 (4 overs)		Aziz Mohammad 67* (44); Avinash Pai 1/2 (2 overs)

Belgium won by 7 wickets
Koge Cricket Club, Køge
Umpires: Munib Haq (Den) and David McLean (Sco)
Player of the match: Aziz Mohammad (Bel)

- Belgium won the toss and elected to field.
- Anthony Hillman, Mohamed Roshan and Matthew Walker (Gib) all made their T20I debuts.

8 July 2026
15:30
Scorecard

Serbia; 136/5 (20 overs)	v	Romania; 140/2 (12.3 overs)
Braithyn Pecic 60* (50); Irfan Ringku 3/18 (4 overs)		Irfan Ringku 68 (34); Peter Nedeljkovic 1/23 (3 overs)

Romania won by 8 wickets
Koge Cricket Club, Køge
Umpires: Munib Haq (Den) and Aidan Seaver (Sco)
Player of the match: Irfan Ringku (Rom)

- Romania won the toss and elected to field.

10 July 2026
10:30
Scorecard

Gibraltar; 124/8 (20 overs)	v	Romania; 125/9 (19.1 overs)
Anthony Hillman 50* (44); Irfan Ringku 2/16 (4 overs)		Avishka Iroshan 53* (44); Kieron Ferrary 4/11 (4 overs)

Romania won by 1 wicket
Svanholm Park, Brøndby
Umpires: Mark Jameson (Ger) and Maulik Prabhudesai (Ned)
Player of the match: Avishka Iroshan (Rom)

- Romania won the toss and elected to field.

10 July 2026
15:30
Scorecard

Belgium; 171/8 (20 overs)	v	Serbia; 107 (19.4 overs)
Shaheryar Butt 50 (36); Wintley Burton 3/28 (3 overs)		Luka Woods 26 (25); Khalid Ahmadi 3/17 (3.4 overs)

Belgium won by 64 runs
Svanholm Park, Brøndby
Umpires: Mark Jameson (Ger) and Aidan Seaver (Sco)
Player of the match: Shaheryar Butt (Bel)

- Serbia won the toss and elected to field.

12 July 2026
10:30
Scorecard

Belgium; 107 (18.3 overs)	v	Romania; 108/8 (18.3 overs)
Omid Malik Khel 22 (22); Rameez Khan 4/26 (4 overs)		Vasu Saini 37 (36); Khalid Ahmadi 3/25 (4 overs)

Romania won by 2 wickets
Koge Cricket Club, Køge
Umpires: David McLean (Sco) and Aidan Seaver (Sco)
Player of the match: Rameez Khan (Rom)

- Romania won the toss and elected to field.

12 July 2026
15:30
Scorecard

Serbia; 139/8 (20 overs)	v	Gibraltar; 143/8 (19.2 overs)
Luka Woods 39 (20); Iain Latin 2/20 (4 overs)		Louis Bruce 42 (38); Luka Woods 3/26 (4 overs)

Gibraltar won by 2 wickets
Koge Cricket Club, Køge
Umpires: Mark Jameson (Ger) and Aidan Seaver (Sco)
Player of the match: Louis Bruce (Gib)

- Gibraltar won the toss and elected to field.
- Alexander Hillman (Gib) made his T20I debut.
- Luka Woods (Srb) took his first hat-trick in T20Is.

=== Group B ===
Group B standings
Pos	Team	Pld	W	L	NR	Pts	NRR	Qualification
1	Denmark (H)	4	4	0	0	8	3.925	Advanced to the final
2	Hungary	4	3	1	0	6	−0.585	Advanced to the 3rd place play-off
3	Norway	4	2	2	0	4	1.568	Advanced to the 5th place play-off
4	Estonia	4	1	3	0	2	−1.963	Advance to the 7th place play-off
5	Turkey	4	0	4	0	0	−4.318	Eliminated

Source: ESPNcricinfo
(H) Host

8 July 2026
10:30
Scorecard

Denmark; 180/6 (20 overs)	v	Estonia; 72/8 (20 overs)
Hamid Shah 77 (48); Zeeshan Ali 3/20 (3 overs)		Zeeshan Ali 25 (20); Surya Anand 4/2 (4 overs)

Denmark won by 108 runs
Svanholm Park, Brøndby
Umpires: Mark Jameson (Ger) and Jonathan Kennedy (Ire)
Player of the match: Hamid Shah (Den)

- Estonia won the toss and elected to field.
- Nicholas Sonne-Rudd (Den), Harri Aggarwal, Rohan Aggarwal and Henri Pattenden (Est) all made their T20I debuts.

8 July 2026
15:30
Scorecard

Hungary; 140/8 (20 overs)	v	Norway; 138/7 (20 overs)
Muhammad Soban 48 (46); Ahmadullah Shinwari 2/16 (3 overs)		Kuruge Abeyrathna 42 (35); Muhammad Saqlain 3/29 (4 overs)

Hungary won by 2 runs
Svanholm Park, Brøndby
Umpires: Jonathan Kennedy (Ire) and Maulik Prabhudesai (Ned)
Player of the match: Muhammad Saqlain (Hun)

- Hungary won the toss and elected to bat.

9 July 2026
10:30
Scorecard

Denmark; 201/4 (20 overs)	v	Turkey; 115/9 (20 overs)
Hamid Shah 79 (45); Murat Yilmaz 1/22 (2 overs)		Ishak Elec 50* (43); Simon Sorensen 3/36 (4 overs)

Denmark won by 86 runs
Koge Cricket Club, Køge
Umpires: Mark Jameson (Ger) and David McLean (Sco)
Player of the match: Hamid Shah (Den)

- Turkey won the toss and elected to field.
- Mertcan Filiz and Furkan Tuskan (Tur) both made their T20I debuts.

9 July 2026
15:30
Scorecard

Estonia; 105/9 (20 overs)	v	Norway; 109/8 (9.5 overs)
Sahil Chauhan 42 (25); Vinay Ravi 2/9 (4 overs)		Ibrahim Rahimi 37 (14); Ashraful Shuvo 4/33 (4 overs)

Norway won by 2 wickets
Koge Cricket Club, Køge
Umpires: Jonathan Kennedy (Ire) and David McLean (Sco)
Player of the match: Ibrahim Rahimi (Nor)

- Norway won the toss and elected to field.

10 July 2026
10:30
Scorecard

Hungary; 132 (19.4 overs)	v	Estonia; 126/8 (20 overs)
Vinoth Ravindran 46 (32); Harri Aggarwal 2/12 (4 overs)		Aditya Panwar 29 (25); Sandeep Mohandas 2/16 (4 overs)

Hungary won by 6 runs
Koge Cricket Club, Køge
Umpires: Jonathan Kennedy (Ire) and David McLean (Sco)
Player of the match: Vinoth Ravindran (Hun)

- Hungary won the toss and elected to bat.

10 July 2026
15:30
Scorecard

Turkey; 95 (17.5 overs)	v	Norway; 97/3 (9.1 overs)
Muhammad Fahad 52 (34); Hayatullah Niazi 3/18 (4 overs)		Walid Ghauri 40 (21); Ibrahim Kursad Dalyan 1/16 (2 overs)

Norway won by 7 wickets
Koge Cricket Club, Køge
Umpires: Munib Haq (Den) and David McLean (Sco)
Player of the match: Hayatullah Niazi (Nor)

- Norway won the toss and elected to field.
- Mertcan Donmez (Tur) made his T20I debut.

12 July 2026
10:30
Scorecard

Denmark; 203/5 (20 overs)	v	Norway; 149 (17.4 overs)
Saif Ahmad 52 (27); Vinay Ravi 3/44 (4 overs)		Hayatullah Niazi 53 (29); Saif Ahmad 3/13 (3 overs)

Denmark won by 54 runs
Svanholm Park, Brøndby
Umpires: Jonathan Kennedy (Ire) and Maulik Prabhudesai (Ned)
Player of the match: Saif Ahmad (Den)

- Norway won the toss and elected to field.

12 July 2026
15:30
Scorecard

Hungary; 164/6 (20 overs)	v	Turkey; 30/5 (5 overs)
Maaz Bhaiji 81 (52); Mecit Ozturk 2/29 (4 overs)		Muhammad Fahad 9 (5); Kamran Wahid 2/5 (1 over)

Hungary won by 20 runs (DLS method)
Svanholm Park, Brøndby
Umpires: Munib Haq (Den) and Maulik Prabhudesai (Ned)
Player of the match: Maaz Bhaiji (Hun)

- Hungary won the toss and elected to bat.
- Turkey were set a revised target of 51 runs from 5 overs due to rain.
- Omer Kutuk (Tur) made his T20I debut.

13 July 2026
10:30
Scorecard

Denmark; 186/3 (20 overs)	v	Hungary; 120 (16.3 overs)
Hamid Shah 95 (51); Kasir Ahmed 2/29 (3 overs)		Vinoth Ravindran 31 (19); Abdullah Mahmood 2/13 (3 overs)

Denmark won by 66 runs
Svanholm Park, Brøndby
Umpires: Maulik Prabhudesai (Ned) and Aidan Seaver (Sco)
Player of the match: Hamid Shah (Den)

- Denmark won the toss and elected to bat.

13 July 2026
15:30
Scorecard

Turkey; 117 (20 overs)	v	Estonia; 118/4 (13.2 overs)
Muhammad Fahad 41 (26); Habib Khan 3/19 (4 overs)		Habib Khan 64 (38); Ali Turkmen 1/13 (2 overs)

Estonia won by 6 wickets
Svanholm Park, Brøndby
Umpires: Munib Haq (Den) and Maulik Prabhudesai (Ned)
Player of the match: Habib Khan (Est)

- Turkey won the toss and elected to bat.

== Play-offs ==
=== 7th place play-off ===
14 July 2026
10:30
Scorecard

Serbia; 148/6 (20 overs)	v	Estonia; 150/4 (19.4 overs)
Leslie Dunbar 50* (30); Habib Khan 2/19 (4 overs)		Habib Khan 43 (40); Peter Nedeljkovic 1/24 (4 overs); Luka Woods 1/24 (4 overs)

Estonia won by 6 wickets
Koge Cricket Club, Køge
Umpires: Munib Haq (Den) and Mark Jameson (Ger)
Player of the match: Habib Khan (Est)

- Serbia won the toss and elected to bat.

=== 5th place play-off ===
14 July 2026
15:30
Scorecard

Norway; 199/1 (20 overs)	v	Gibraltar; 175/6 (20 overs)
Saif-Ul Islam 91* (63); Louis Bruce 1/21 (2 overs)		Louis Bruce 53 (35); Farmanullah Ghari 2/32 (4 overs)

Norway won by 24 runs
Koge Cricket Club, Køge
Umpires: Mark Jameson (Ger) and Aidan Seaver (Ire)
Player of the match: Saif-Ul Islam (Nor)

- Norway won the toss and elected to bat.

=== 3rd place play-off ===
14 July 2026
10:30
Scorecard

Hungary; 77 (19.3 overs)	v	Belgium; 78/0 (6 overs)
Zahir Mohammed 26 (20); Ahmad Khalid Ahmadzai 4/15 (4 overs)		Walid Sahibzada 56* (28)

Belgium won by 10 wickets
Svanholm Park, Brøndby
Umpires: Jonathan Kennedy (Ire) and Maulik Prabhudesai (Ned)
Player of the match: Ahmad Khalid Ahmadzai (Bel)

- Hungary won the toss and elected to bat.

=== Final ===
14 July 2026
15:30
Scorecard

Denmark; 162/7 (20 overs)	v	Romania; 156/8 (20 overs)
Musa Shaheen 80 (56); Rameez Khan 2/16 (4 overs)		Taranjeet Singh 54 (42); Saud Munir 4/23 (4 overs)

Denmark won by 6 runs
Svanholm Park, Brøndby
Umpires: Jonathan Kennedy (Ire) and David McLean (Sco)
Player of the match: Saud Munir (Den)

- Romania won the toss and elected to field.
