= Sultan Ahmad (disambiguation) =

Sultan Ahmad was Timurid ruler of Samarkand, 1469–1494.

Sultan Ahmad may also refer to:

- Ahmed Tekuder, also known as Sultan Ahmad (reigned 1282–1284), sultan of the Persian-based Ilkhanate
- Ahmad (Jalayirids), Jalayirid ruler of Baghdad, 1382–1410
- Sultan Ahmad (Guantanamo detainee 842)

== See also ==
- Sultan Ahmed (disambiguation)
