= Sebastian de Oliveira =

South African cricketer (born 2001)

Personal information
- Full name: Sebastian Cruz de Oliveira
- Born: 8 June 2001 (age 25)
- Batting: Right-handed
- Bowling: Right-arm fast medium

International information
- National side: Portugal
- T20I debut (cap 45): 1 July 2026 v Sweden
- Last T20I: 1 July 2026 v Sweden

Domestic team information
- Years: Team
- 2020: Gauteng
- Source: Cricinfo, 18 January 2020

Sebastian Cruz de Oliveira (born 8 June 2001) is a South African-born Portuguese cricketer who currently plays for the Portugal national cricket team. He made his List A debut on 19 January 2020, for Gauteng in the 2019–20 CSA Provincial One-Day Challenge.

== Career ==
After playing in the South African domestic circuit, Sebastian switched allegiance to Portugal in 2026 and made his Twenty20 International (T20I) debut on 1 July 2026 against Sweden. In the second match, he was adjudjed man of the match for his four-wicket haul, taking 4 wickets for 25 runs.
