= 2028 Men's T20 World Cup Global Qualifier =

Cricket tournament

2028 ICC Men's T20 World Cup Qualifier
- Dates: TBD – 2028
- Administrator: International Cricket Council
- Cricket format: Twenty20 International
- Tournament format: Round-robin tournament
- Host: TBD
- Participants: 16
- Matches: 31

The 2028 ICC Men's T20 World Cup Global Qualifier will be a cricket tournament that will be held to determine the remaining teams that will qualify for the 2028 Men's T20 World Cup. The tournament will also serve as the final part of the qualification process for the 2028 Men's T20 World Cup.

== Format ==
In November 2026, the ICC announced a new format for the tournament. The 16 qualifying teams will be divided into four groups of four teams. In the group stage, each team will play each of the other teams in a single round-robin format. The top two teams in each group will advance to the quarter-finals stage followed by semi-finals and final.

== Teams and qualifications ==
The sub-regional qualifiers began on 8 March 2026. The winners from each regional final will be joined by the teams that were initially given a bye after having participated in the previous edition. Scotland qualified directly for the Europe regional final, as they had participated in the tournament as a replacement for Bangladesh.

Teams qualified for the 2028 Men's T20 World Cup Global Qualifier
Means of qualification	Date of qualification	Host(s)	Berths	Qualified teams
Automatic qualifications
2026 T20 World Cup	15 July 2026	India & Sri Lanka	8	Canada
2026 T20 World Cup	15 July 2026	India & Sri Lanka	8	Italy
2026 T20 World Cup	15 July 2026	India & Sri Lanka	8	Namibia
2026 T20 World Cup	15 July 2026	India & Sri Lanka	8	Nepal
2026 T20 World Cup	15 July 2026	India & Sri Lanka	8	Netherlands
2026 T20 World Cup	15 July 2026	India & Sri Lanka	8	Oman
2026 T20 World Cup	15 July 2026	India & Sri Lanka	8	United Arab Emirates
2026 T20 World Cup	15 July 2026	India & Sri Lanka	8	United States
Regional qualifications
Africa	TBD	TBD	2	TBD
Africa	TBD	TBD	2	TBD
Americas	31 October 2027	Cayman Islands	1	TBD
Asia	TBD	TBD	2	TBD
Asia	TBD	TBD	2	TBD
East Asia-Pacific	TBD	TBD	1	TBD
Europe	TBD	TBD	2	TBD
Europe	TBD	TBD	2	TBD
Total			16	

== Group stage ==
The 16 teams will be divided into four groups of four teams with the matches played in a single round-robin format. The group stage will feature a total of 24 matches.

Group A	Group B	Group C	Group D
(To be determined) TBD; (To be determined) TBD; (To be determined) TBD; (To be determined) TBD	(To be determined) TBD; (To be determined) TBD; (To be determined) TBD; (To be determined) TBD	(To be determined) TBD; (To be determined) TBD; (To be determined) TBD; (To be determined) TBD	(To be determined) TBD; (To be determined) TBD; (To be determined) TBD; (To be determined) TBD

=== Group A ===
Group A standings
Pos	Team	Pld	W	L	NR	Pts	NRR
1	(To be determined) TBD	0	0	0	0	0	—
2	(To be determined) TBD	0	0	0	0	0	—
3	(To be determined) TBD	0	0	0	0	0	—
4	(To be determined) TBD	0	0	0	0	0	—

First match(es) will be played: unknown. Source:

=== Group B ===
Group B standings
Pos	Team	Pld	W	L	NR	Pts	NRR
1	(To be determined) TBD	0	0	0	0	0	—
2	(To be determined) TBD	0	0	0	0	0	—
3	(To be determined) TBD	0	0	0	0	0	—
4	(To be determined) TBD	0	0	0	0	0	—

First match(es) will be played: unknown. Source:

=== Group C ===
Group C standings
Pos	Team	Pld	W	L	NR	Pts	NRR
1	(To be determined) TBD	0	0	0	0	0	—
2	(To be determined) TBD	0	0	0	0	0	—
3	(To be determined) TBD	0	0	0	0	0	—
4	(To be determined) TBD	0	0	0	0	0	—

First match(es) will be played: unknown. Source:

=== Group D ===
Group D standings
Pos	Team	Pld	W	L	NR	Pts	NRR
1	(To be determined) TBD	0	0	0	0	0	—
2	(To be determined) TBD	0	0	0	0	0	—
3	(To be determined) TBD	0	0	0	0	0	—
4	(To be determined) TBD	0	0	0	0	0	—

First match(es) will be played: unknown. Source:
