= Sultan Ahmed =

Sultan Ahmed or Sultan Ahmet may refer to:

- Ahmed I of the Ottoman Empire
- Ahmed II of the Ottoman Empire
- Ahmed III of the Ottoman Empire
- Ahmad Beg of the Aq Qoyunlu
- Sultanahmet Meydanı (or Square), the Turkish name for the Hippodrome of Constantinople
- Sultan Ahmed Mosque, Istanbul

== Politicians ==
- Sultan Ahmed (Bangladeshi politician) (1912–1977), Provincial Minister of East Pakistan in Pakistan
- Sultan Ahmed (Burmese politician) (1901–1981), Burmese politician
- Sultan Ahmed (Indian politician) (1953–2017), Union Minister of State for Tourism in India
- Syed Sultan Ahmed (1880–1963), Indian barrister and politician
- Sultan Ahmed (Burmese politician) (1901–1981), Burmese politician
- Syed Sultan Ahmed (1880–1963), Indian barrister and politician

== Other people ==
- Sultan Ahmed (Omani cricketer) (born 1977)
- Sultan Ahmed (Emirati cricketer) (born 1989)
- Sultan Ahmed (director) (1938–2002), Indian film director
- Sultan Ahmed (Guantanamo detainee 842), Pakistani captive released June 28, 2005
- Sultan Ahmed (Bangladeshi politician) (1912–1977), Provincial Minister of East Pakistan in Pakistan
- Sultan Ahmed (Indian politician) (1953–2017), Union Minister of State for Tourism in India

== See also ==
- Sultan Ahmad (disambiguation)
