= 2028 Men's T20 World Cup qualification =

2028 ICC Men's T20 World Cup qualification
- Dates: 8 March 2026 – 2028
- Administrators: International Cricket Council; ICC Africa; ICC Asia; ICC Americas; ICC East Asia-Pacific; ICC Europe
- Cricket format: Twenty20 International
- Host: Various
- Participants: 12 (direct); 80 (regional stage); 8 (regional & global stages); 8 (global stage)
- Matches: 177

The 2028 ICC Men's T20 World Cup will be the eleventh edition of the ICC Men's T20 World Cup, a biennial world cup for cricket in Twenty20 International (T20I) format, organised by the International Cricket Council (ICC). It will be co-hosted by Cricket Australia and New Zealand Cricket from 21 October to 19 November 2028. It will be the first time for New Zealand to host the event, while Australia had previously hosted the competition in 2022.

In July 2026, the ICC confirmed the qualification process with the reintroduction of the Men's T20 World Cup Global Qualifier which served as the third stage of the qualification pathway until 2022. The qualification process for the 2028 tournament includes three stages: direct qualification, regional qualification and a Global Qualifier.

== Format ==
The qualification process for the 2028 Men's T20 World Cup is held in three stages:

- Direct qualification: The top eight teams from the previous edition along with the 2028 hosts and the next best two to four teams (depending on the finishing positions of the hosts in the previous edition) from the ICC Men's T20I Team Rankings qualify directly for the tournament.
- Regional qualification: The regional qualifiers for each ICC region were held two stages:
  - Sub-regional qualifiers: This stage comprised one or more tournaments depending on the ICC region. Matches were held in either single round-robin or double round-robin format and sometimes included group stage and knockout stage or playoffs formats as well. The stipulated number of teams advanced into the next stage.
  - Regional final: Teams advancing from the sub-regional qualifier took part in this stage. Matches were held in either single round-robin or double round-robin format and sometimes included group stage and knockout stage or playoffs formats as well. The stipulated number of teams advanced to the Global Qualifier.
- Global Qualifier: Top teams unable to earn direct qualification along with teams advancing from the regional finals took part in this stage. The highest-placed team from each region along with the next three highest-placed teams will advance to the 2028 T20 World Cup.

Summary of qualification for the Global Qualifier
ICC region	Global Qualifier			Regional qualifiers		
ICC region	Slots per region	No. of directly qualified teams	Remaining slots	No. of participants	Start date	End date
Africa	3	1	2	19	24 March 2026	
Americas	3	2	1	9	8 March 2026	
Asia	5	3	2	13	3 October 2026	
East Asia-Pacific	1	0	1	9	8 May 2026	
Europe	4	2	2	30	16 May 2026	
Total	16	8	8	80		

== Qualified teams ==
Highlighted are the countries that participated in the 2028 Men's T20 World Cup qualification pathway. Qualified directly (hosts, top teams from the previous tournament, or via T20I Rankings) Teams whose qualification status is yet to be decided Participated in the regional qualifiers but failed to qualify ICC members who did not enter in the qualification

Australia and New Zealand qualify automatically as hosts, along with the teams that reached the Super 8 stage of the previous T20 World Cup and the next three top-ranked teams in the ICC Rankings after the completion of the tournament. The remaining slots will be filled by global qualifier.

Details of the teams qualified for the 2028 T20 World Cup
Team	Method of qualification	Date of qualification	Venue(s)	Number of teams	Total times qualified	Last appearance	Previous best performance
Australia	Hosts	16 November 2021	—N/a	2	11	2026	Winners (2021)
New Zealand	Hosts	16 November 2021	—N/a	2	11	2026	Runners-up (2021, 2026)
England	2026 ICC Men's T20 World Cup (Top teams from the previous tournament, excluding the hosts)	20 February 2026	India & Sri Lanka	7	11	2026	Winners (2010, 2022)
India	2026 ICC Men's T20 World Cup (Top teams from the previous tournament, excluding the hosts)	20 February 2026	India & Sri Lanka	7	11	2026	Winners (2007, 2024, 2026)
Pakistan	2026 ICC Men's T20 World Cup (Top teams from the previous tournament, excluding the hosts)	20 February 2026	India & Sri Lanka	7	11	2026	Winners (2009)
South Africa	2026 ICC Men's T20 World Cup (Top teams from the previous tournament, excluding the hosts)	20 February 2026	India & Sri Lanka	7	11	2026	Runners-up (2024)
Sri Lanka	2026 ICC Men's T20 World Cup (Top teams from the previous tournament, excluding the hosts)	20 February 2026	India & Sri Lanka	7	11	2026	Winners (2014)
West Indies	2026 ICC Men's T20 World Cup (Top teams from the previous tournament, excluding the hosts)	20 February 2026	India & Sri Lanka	7	11	2026	Winners (2012, 2016)
Zimbabwe	2026 ICC Men's T20 World Cup (Top teams from the previous tournament, excluding the hosts)	20 February 2026	India & Sri Lanka	7	8	2026	Super 8 (2026)
Afghanistan	ICC Men's T20I Team Rankings	9 March 2026	—N/a	3	9	2026	Semi-finals (2024)
Bangladesh	ICC Men's T20I Team Rankings	9 March 2026	—N/a	3	10	2024	Super 8 (2007, 2024)
Ireland	ICC Men's T20I Team Rankings	9 March 2026	—N/a	3	9	2026	Super 8 (2009)
To be determined	Global Qualifier			8			
To be determined	Global Qualifier			8			
To be determined	Global Qualifier			8			
To be determined	Global Qualifier			8			
To be determined	Global Qualifier			8			
To be determined	Global Qualifier			8			
To be determined	Global Qualifier			8			
To be determined	Global Qualifier			8			
Total				20			

== Africa qualifier ==
The qualification stages are as follows:

- Qualifier A: Seven teams played round-robin format for 21 matches from 22 May to 1 June 2026 in Botswana.
- Qualifier B: Six teams played round-robin format in 15 matches from 24 to 29 March 2026 in Ghana.
- Qualifier C: Six teams to play in round-robin format for 15 matches in October 2026 in Nigeria.
- Regional final: TBA

=== Africa sub-regional qualifiers ===
The sub-regional qualifiers were hosted by the Botswana Cricket Association, the Ghana Cricket Association and the Nigeria Cricket Federation. The top two sides of each sub-regional qualifier (Kenya and Rwanda from qualifier A, Ghana and Tanzania from qualifier B and TBD from qualifier C) advanced to the regional final.

==== Africa qualifier A ====
Qualifier A standings
Pos	Team	Pld	W	L	NR	Pts	NRR	Qualification
1	Rwanda	6	6	0	0	12	3.870	Advanced to the regional final
2	Kenya	6	5	1	0	10	4.828	Advanced to the regional final
3	Botswana (H)	6	4	2	0	8	3.785	Eliminated
4	Cameroon	6	3	3	0	6	0.904	Eliminated
5	Sierra Leone	6	2	4	0	4	−0.377	Eliminated
6	Mali	6	1	5	0	2	−4.817	Eliminated
7	Ivory Coast	6	0	6	0	0	−9.065	Eliminated

Source: ESPNcricinfo
(H) Host

==== Africa qualifier B ====
Qualifier B standings
Pos	Team	Pld	W	L	NR	Pts	NRR	Qualification
1	Tanzania	5	4	0	1	9	6.705	Advanced to the regional final
2	Ghana (H)	5	4	0	1	9	3.309	Advanced to the regional final
3	Malawi	5	2	2	1	5	0.778	Eliminated
4	Seychelles	5	1	3	1	3	−3.045	Eliminated
5	Eswatini	5	1	3	1	3	−3.983	Eliminated
6	Saint Helena	5	0	4	1	1	−3.931	Eliminated

Source: Cricinfo
(H) Host

==== Africa qualifier C ====
Qualifier C standings
Pos	Team	Pld	W	L	NR	Pts	NRR	Qualification
1	Nigeria	5	5	0	0	10	4.610	Advanced to the regional final
2	Uganda	5	4	1	0	8	4.874	Advanced to the regional final
3	Zambia	5	2	3	0	4	0.101	
4	Mozambique	5	2	3	0	4	−2.731	
5	Lesotho	5	1	4	0	2	−1.371	
6	Gambia	5	1	4	0	2	−4.242	

Source: Cricinfo

=== Africa regional final ===
The regional final will be hosted by TBA. The top two sides of the regional final will advance to the Global Qualifier.

Regional final standings
Pos	Team	Pld	W	L	NR	Pts	NRR	Qualification
1	Ghana	0	0	0	0	0	—	Advance to the global qualifier
2	Kenya	0	0	0	0	0	—	Advance to the global qualifier
3	Nigeria	0	0	0	0	0	—	
4	Rwanda	0	0	0	0	0	—	
5	Tanzania	0	0	0	0	0	—	
6	Uganda	0	0	0	0	0	—	

First match(es) will be played: unknown. Source:

== Americas qualifier ==
The qualification stages are as follows:

- Qualifier A: Five teams to play in round-robin format for 10 matches from 19 to 28 June 2026 in Bermuda.
- Qualifier B: Four teams played double round-robin format in 12 matches from 8 to 15 March 2026 in Cayman Islands.
- Regional final: TBA

=== Americas sub-regional qualifiers ===
The sub-regional qualifiers will be hosted by Bermuda Cricket Board and Cayman Islands Cricket Association. The top sides of each sub-regional qualifier will advance to the regional final.

==== Americas qualifier A ====
Qualifier A standings
Pos	Team	Pld	W	L	NR	Pts	NRR	Qualification
1	Bermuda (H)	4	3	0	1	7	7.776	Advanced to the regional final
2	Bahamas	4	2	1	1	5	0.255	Advanced to the regional final
3	Panama	4	2	1	1	5	−0.170	Eliminated
4	Belize	4	1	2	1	3	−1.087	Eliminated
5	Brazil	4	0	4	0	0	−3.134	Eliminated

Source: ESPNcricinfo
(H) Host

==== Americas qualifier B ====
Qualifier B standings
Pos	Team	Pld	W	L	NR	Pts	NRR	Qualification
1	Cayman Islands (H)	6	6	0	0	12	3.560	Advanced to the regional final
2	Argentina	6	4	2	0	8	0.831	Advanced to the regional final
3	Suriname	6	1	5	0	2	−1.387	Eliminated
4	Mexico	6	1	5	0	2	−2.413	Eliminated

Source: ESPNcricinfo
(H) Host

=== Americas regional final ===
The winner of the regional final will qualify for the 2028 T20 World Cup Global Qualifier.

Regional final standings
Pos	Team	Pld	W	L	NR	Pts	NRR	Qualification
1	Argentina	0	0	0	0	0	—	Advance to the global qualifier
2	Bahamas	0	0	0	0	0	—	
3	Bermuda	0	0	0	0	0	—	
4	Cayman Islands (H)	0	0	0	0	0	—	

First match(es) will be played: 21 October 2027. Source:
(H) Host

== Asia qualifier ==
The qualification stages are as follows:

- Qualifier A: Seven teams played in round-robin format for 21 matches from 5 to 14 October 2026 in Malaysia.
- Qualifier B: Six teams played in round-robin format for 15 matches from 8 to 14 October 2026 in Malaysia.
- Regional final: TBA

=== Asia sub-regional qualifiers ===
==== Asia qualifier A ====
Qualifier A standings
Pos	Team	Pld	W	L	NR	Pts	NRR	Qualification
1	Kuwait	6	5	1	0	10	5.775	Advanced to the regional final
2	Bahrain	6	5	1	0	10	2.283	Advanced to the regional final
3	Qatar	6	4	1	1	9	1.960	Advanced to the regional final
4	Thailand	6	3	3	0	6	1.518	Eliminated
5	Bhutan	6	2	4	0	4	−1.139	Eliminated
6	Myanmar	6	1	5	0	2	−2.013	Eliminated
7	Mongolia	6	0	5	1	1	−8.450	Eliminated

Source: Cricinfo

==== Asia qualifier B ====
Qualifier B standings
Pos	Team	Pld	W	L	NR	Pts	NRR	Qualification
1	Saudi Arabia	5	5	0	0	10	3.147	Advanced to the regional final
2	Hong Kong	5	3	1	1	7	2.471	Advanced to the regional final
3	Malaysia (H)	5	3	2	0	6	2.506	Advanced to the regional final
4	Singapore	5	2	3	0	4	−0.670	Eliminated
5	Maldives	5	1	3	1	3	−2.390	Eliminated
6	China	5	0	5	0	0	−5.074	Eliminated

Source: Cricinfo
(H) Host

=== Asia regional final ===
The top two teams of the regional final will qualify for the 2028 T20 World Cup Global Qualifier.

Regional final standings
Pos	Team	Pld	W	L	NR	Pts	NRR	Qualification
1	Bahrain	0	0	0	0	0	—	Advance to the global qualifier
2	Hong Kong	0	0	0	0	0	—	Advance to the global qualifier
3	Kuwait	0	0	0	0	0	—	
4	Malaysia	0	0	0	0	0	—	
5	Qatar	0	0	0	0	0	—	
6	Saudi Arabia	0	0	0	0	0	—	

First match(es) will be played: unknown. Source:

== East Asia-Pacific qualifier ==
The qualification stages are as follows:

- Sub-regional qualifier: Nine teams were divided into three groups, followed by a six-team round-robin stage, for a total of 21 matches played from 8 to 18 May 2026 in Japan.
- Regional final: TBA

=== East Asia-Pacific sub-regional qualifier ===
Nine teams were divided into three groups, followed by a six-team round-robin stage, for a total of 21 matches played from 8 to 18 May 2026 in Japan. The tournament was hosted by Japan with the top four teams from the Super 6 stage advancing to the regional final.

=== Group stage ===
Group A

Group 1 standings
Pos	Team	Pld	W	L	NR	Pts	NRR	Qualification
1	Japan (H)	2	2	0	0	4	3.113	Advanced to the Super six
2	Vanuatu	2	1	1	0	2	2.275	Advanced to the Super six
3	Fiji	2	0	2	0	0	−5.932	Eliminated

Source: ESPNcricinfo
(H) Host

Group B

Group 2 standings
Pos	Team	Pld	W	L	NR	Pts	NRR	Qualification
1	Samoa	2	2	0	0	4	4.780	Advanced to the Super six
2	Indonesia	2	1	1	0	2	−1.695	Advanced to the Super six
3	Philippines	2	0	2	0	0	−2.675	Eliminated

Source: ESPNcricinfo

Group C

Group 3 standings
Pos	Team	Pld	W	L	NR	Pts	NRR	Qualification
1	Papua New Guinea	2	2	0	0	4	4.625	Advanced to the Super six
2	Cook Islands	2	1	1	0	2	1.995	Advanced to the Super six
3	South Korea	2	0	2	0	0	−7.273	Eliminated

Source: ESPNcricinfo

=== Super six stage ===
Super six standings
Pos	Team	Pld	W	L	NR	Pts	NRR	Qualification
1	Papua New Guinea	5	4	1	0	8	2.110	Advanced to the regional final
2	Japan (H)	5	4	1	0	8	1.481	Advanced to the regional final
3	Samoa	5	3	2	0	6	1.117	Advanced to the regional final
4	Cook Islands	5	3	2	0	6	−0.509	Advanced to the regional final
5	Vanuatu	5	1	4	0	2	−2.553	Eliminated
6	Indonesia	5	0	5	0	0	−2.139	Eliminated

Source: ESPNcricinfo
(H) Host

=== East Asia-Pacific regional final ===
The winner of the regional final will advance to the Global Qualifier.

Regional final standings
Pos	Team	Pld	W	L	NR	Pts	NRR	Qualification
1	Cook Islands	0	0	0	0	0	—	Advanced to the global qualifier
2	Japan	0	0	0	0	0	—	
3	Papua New Guinea	0	0	0	0	0	—	
4	Samoa	0	0	0	0	0	—	

First match(es) will be played: 2027. Source:

== Europe qualifier ==
The qualification stages are as follows:

- Qualifier A: Ten teams divided into two groups of five played round-robin format followed by playoffs for a total of 24 matches from 16 to 23 May 2026 in Cyprus.
- Qualifier B: Nine teams divided into two groups played round-robin format followed by playoffs for a total of 20 matches from 8 to 15 July 2026 in Denmark.
- Qualifier C: Ten teams divided into two groups of five played round-robin format followed by playoffs for a total of 24 matches from 14 to 21 August 2026 in Finland.
- Regional final: Six teams will play in round-robin format for 15 matches in 2027.

=== Europe sub-regional qualifiers ===
The sub-regional qualifiers were hosted by Cyprus Cricket Association, Danish Cricket Federation and Cricket Finland. The top sides of each sub-regional qualifier will advance to the regional final.

==== Europe qualifier A ====
Group stage

Group A standings
Pos	Team	Pld	W	L	NR	Pts	NRR	Qualification
1	Jersey	4	4	0	0	8	4.352	Advanced to the final
2	France	4	3	1	0	6	1.537	Advanced to the 3rd place play-off
3	Croatia	4	2	2	0	4	−2.100	Advanced to the 5th place play-off
4	Switzerland	4	1	3	0	2	−1.333	Advanced to the 7th place play-off
5	Cyprus (H)	4	0	4	0	0	−1.829	Eliminated

Source: ESPNcricinfo
(H) Host

Group B standings
Pos	Team	Pld	W	L	NR	Pts	NRR	Qualification
1	Guernsey	4	4	0	0	8	2.286	Advanced to the final
2	Sweden	4	2	2	0	4	0.422	Advanced to the 3rd place play-off
3	Austria	4	2	2	0	4	0.284	Advanced to the 5th place play-off
4	Malta	4	2	2	0	4	−0.084	Advanced to the 7th place play-off
5	Slovenia	4	0	4	0	0	−3.181	Eliminated

Source: ESPNcricinfo

Qualifier A final

- Jersey defeated Guernsey by 4 wickets.

==== Europe qualifier B ====
Group stage

Group A standings
Pos	Team	Pld	W	L	NR	Pts	NRR	Qualification
1	Romania	3	3	0	0	6	1.319	Advanced to the final
2	Belgium	3	2	1	0	4	1.494	Advanced to the 3rd place play-off
3	Gibraltar	3	1	2	0	2	−0.562	Advanced to the 5th place play-off
4	Serbia	3	0	3	0	0	−2.392	Advanced to the 7th place play-off

Source: ESPNcricinfo

Group B standings
Pos	Team	Pld	W	L	NR	Pts	NRR	Qualification
1	Denmark (H)	4	4	0	0	8	3.925	Advanced to the final
2	Hungary	4	3	1	0	6	−0.585	Advanced to the 3rd place play-off
3	Norway	4	2	2	0	4	1.568	Advanced to the 5th place play-off
4	Estonia	4	1	3	0	2	−1.963	Advance to the 7th place play-off
5	Turkey	4	0	4	0	0	−4.318	Eliminated

Source: ESPNcricinfo
(H) Host

Qualifier B final

- Denmark defeated Romania by 6 runs.

==== Europe qualifier C ====
Group stage

Group A standings
Pos	Team	Pld	W	L	NR	Pts	NRR	Qualification
1	Spain	4	4	0	0	8	4.772	Advanced to the final
2	Finland (H)	4	2	1	1	5	2.321	Advance to the 3rd place play-off
3	Isle of Man	4	2	1	1	5	1.201	Advance to the 5th place play-off
4	Bulgaria	4	1	3	0	2	−4.367	Advanced to the 7th place play-off
5	Luxembourg	4	0	4	0	0	−3.340	Eliminated

Source: Cricinfo
(H) Host

Group B standings
Pos	Team	Pld	W	L	NR	Pts	NRR	Qualification
1	Portugal	4	4	0	0	8	3.319	Advance to the final
2	Germany	4	3	1	0	6	3.763	Advance to the 3rd place play-off
3	Israel	4	2	2	0	4	−2.732	Advance to the 5th place play-off
4	Czech Republic	4	1	3	0	2	−2.605	Advance to the 7th place play-off
5	Greece	4	0	4	0	0	−2.454	Eliminated

Source: Cricinfo

Qualifier C final

- Portugal defeated Spain by 57 runs.

=== Europe regional final ===
Scotland qualified directly for the regional final after receiving a bye due to their participation in the 2026 T20 World Cup. However, they did not receive a bye to the global qualifier, as they had participated in the previous tournament as a replacement team. The top two teams from the regional final will qualify for the 2028 T20 World Cup Global Qualifier.

Regional final standings
Pos	Team	Pld	W	L	NR	Pts	NRR	Qualification
1	Denmark	0	0	0	0	0	—	Advance to the global qualifier
2	Guernsey	0	0	0	0	0	—	Advance to the global qualifier
3	Jersey	0	0	0	0	0	—	
4	Portugal	0	0	0	0	0	—	
5	Scotland	0	0	0	0	0	—	
6	Spain	0	0	0	0	0	—	

First match(es) will be played: 2027. Source:

== Global qualifier ==
Teams qualified for the 2028 Men's T20 World Cup Global Qualifier
Team	Method of qualification	Date of qualification	Venue(s)	Number of teams
Canada	2026 T20 World Cup	15 July 2026	India & Sri Lanka	8
Italy	2026 T20 World Cup	15 July 2026	India & Sri Lanka	8
Namibia	2026 T20 World Cup	15 July 2026	India & Sri Lanka	8
Nepal	2026 T20 World Cup	15 July 2026	India & Sri Lanka	8
Netherlands	2026 T20 World Cup	15 July 2026	India & Sri Lanka	8
Oman	2026 T20 World Cup	15 July 2026	India & Sri Lanka	8
United Arab Emirates	2026 T20 World Cup	15 July 2026	India & Sri Lanka	8
United States	2026 T20 World Cup	15 July 2026	India & Sri Lanka	8
To be determined	Africa Qualifier			2
To be determined	Africa Qualifier			2
To be determined	Americas Qualifier			1
To be determined	Asia Qualifier			2
To be determined	Asia Qualifier			2
To be determined	East Asia-Pacific Qualifier			1
To be determined	Europe Qualifier			2
To be determined	Europe Qualifier			2
Total				16
