= 2028 Men's T20 World Cup =

International cricket tournament

2028 ICC Men's T20 World Cup
- Tournament logo
- Dates: 12 October – 12 November 2028
- Administrator: International Cricket Council
- Cricket format: Twenty20 International
- Tournament format(s): Group stage, Super 10 and Knockout stage
- Hosts: Australia; New Zealand
- Participants: 20
- Matches: 55

The 2028 ICC Men's T20 World Cup will be the eleventh edition of the ICC Men's T20 World Cup, co-hosted by Cricket Australia and New Zealand Cricket from 12 October to 12 November 2028. It will be the first time that New Zealand would host the event, while Australia had previously hosted the competition in 2022. A total of twenty teams will compete in 55 matches.

Twenty teams will compete in the tournament, which includes the teams from the two hosts, the top seven teams from the previous edition, the three highest-ranked teams in the ICC Men's T20I Team Rankings not already qualified, and eight other teams determined through a series of qualifiers leading up to the Global Qualifier tournament.

India are the defending champions.

== Background ==
The ICC Men's T20 World Cup is a biennial world cup for cricket in Twenty20 International (T20I) format, organised by the International Cricket Council (ICC). It was first played in 2007 in South Africa, and the 2028 tournament will mark its eleventh edition. The tenth edition, held in 2026 in India and Sri Lanka, was contested by 20 teams, and was won by India, who defeated New Zealand in the final.

=== Host selection ===
In November 2021 as part of the 2024–2031 ICC men's hosts cycle, the ICC announced that the 2028 Men's T20 World Cup would be played in Australia and New Zealand. It would be the first time New Zealand Cricket (NZC) would host the competition while, Cricket Australia (CA) had previously hosted the competition in 2022.

=== Format ===
In July 2026, the ICC announced a new format for the tournament. The 20 qualifying teams will be divided into five groups of four each. In the group stage, each team will play each of the other teams in the group once in a round-robin format. The top two teams in each group will advance to the Super 10 stage, where the 10 teams will be divided into two groups of five teams each, and play a second round of round-robin matches.

The top three teams from each Super 10 group will advance to the knockout stage, which consists of two eliminators, two semi-finals and the final. For the first time in the tournament's history, the knockout stage was expanded to feature six teams. Group winners of the Super 10 stage will directly advance to the semi-finals, while the second-placed and third-placed teams will compete in two eliminator matches whose winners will advance to the semi-finals.

=== Schedule ===
In March 2026, the ICC announced that the 2028 tournament would be held from 21 October to 19 November 2028. In October 2026, the ICC announced that the 2028 tournament would instead be held from 12 October to 12 November 2028. The tournament will be part of the 2027–2031 ICC Men's Future Tours Programme.

== Qualification ==
In July 2026, the ICC confirmed the qualification process with the reintroduction of the Men's T20 World Cup Global Qualifier which served as the third stage of the qualification pathway until 2022. The hosts, Australia and New Zealand, along with the teams that reached the Super 8 stage of the previous tournament: England, India, Pakistan, South Africa, Sri Lanka, the West Indies and Zimbabwe; qualified directly for the 2028 tournament. The remaining three direct qualification places were allocated to the next best-ranked teams in the ICC Men's T20I Team Rankings as on 9 March 2026, that had not finished in the top seven: Afghanistan, Bangladesh and Ireland. The eight remaining places will be determined through a Global Qualifier tournament, in which the bottom eight teams from the previous T20 World Cup (excluding Scotland): Canada, Italy, Namibia, Nepal, Netherlands, Oman, the United Arab Emirates and the United States; along with the eight teams advancing from the regional qualifiers will compete.

Teams qualified for the tournament
Method of qualification	No. of teams	Teams qualified
Hosts	2	Australia
Hosts	2	New Zealand
2026 Men's T20 World Cup (Top teams from the previous tournament, excluding hosts)	7	England
2026 Men's T20 World Cup (Top teams from the previous tournament, excluding hosts)	7	India
2026 Men's T20 World Cup (Top teams from the previous tournament, excluding hosts)	7	Pakistan
2026 Men's T20 World Cup (Top teams from the previous tournament, excluding hosts)	7	South Africa
2026 Men's T20 World Cup (Top teams from the previous tournament, excluding hosts)	7	Sri Lanka
2026 Men's T20 World Cup (Top teams from the previous tournament, excluding hosts)	7	West Indies
2026 Men's T20 World Cup (Top teams from the previous tournament, excluding hosts)	7	Zimbabwe
ICC Men's T20I Team Rankings	3	Afghanistan
ICC Men's T20I Team Rankings	3	Bangladesh
ICC Men's T20I Team Rankings	3	Ireland
Global Qualifier	8	TBD
Global Qualifier	8	TBD
Global Qualifier	8	TBD
Global Qualifier	8	TBD
Global Qualifier	8	TBD
Global Qualifier	8	TBD
Global Qualifier	8	TBD
Global Qualifier	8	TBD
Total	20	

== Venues ==
In March 2026, the CA and the NZC launched the venue selection process. In October 2026, Nine News reported that the 2028 T20 World Cup would likely be played at five venues in Australia – Adelaide Oval in Adelaide, The Gabba in Brisbane, Melbourne Cricket Ground in Melbourne, Perth Stadium in Perth and Sydney Cricket Ground in Sydney – and three venues in New Zealand – Eden Park in Auckland, Hagley Oval in Christchurch and Wellington Regional Stadium in Wellington.

== Group stage ==
The 20 teams will be divided into five groups of four with each team facing the other teams in the group. The group stage will feature a total of 30 matches.

Group A	Group B	Group C	Group D	Group E
TBD; TBD; TBD; TBD	TBD; TBD; TBD; TBD	TBD; TBD; TBD; TBD	TBD; TBD; TBD; TBD	TBD; TBD; TBD; TBD

=== Group A ===
Group A standings
Pos	Team	Pld	W	L	NR	Pts	NRR	Qualification
1	A1	0	0	0	0	0	—	Advance to the Super 10 stage
2	A2	0	0	0	0	0	—	Advance to the Super 10 stage
3	A3	0	0	0	0	0	—	
4	A4	0	0	0	0	0	—	

First match(es) will be played: unknown. Source: Cricinfo
Rules for classification: 1) Points; 2) Wins; 3) Net run rate; 4) Results of games between tied teams; 5) T20I Rankings ahead of the tournament

=== Group B ===
Group B standings
Pos	Team	Pld	W	L	NR	Pts	NRR	Qualification
1	B1	0	0	0	0	0	—	Advance to the Super 10 stage
2	B2	0	0	0	0	0	—	Advance to the Super 10 stage
3	B3	0	0	0	0	0	—	
4	B4	0	0	0	0	0	—	

First match(es) will be played: unknown. Source: Cricinfo
Rules for classification: 1) Points; 2) Wins; 3) Net run rate; 4) Results of games between tied teams; 5) T20I Rankings ahead of the tournament

=== Group C ===
Group C standings
Pos	Team	Pld	W	L	NR	Pts	NRR	Qualification
1	C1	0	0	0	0	0	—	Advance to the Super 10 stage
2	C2	0	0	0	0	0	—	Advance to the Super 10 stage
3	C3	0	0	0	0	0	—	
4	C4	0	0	0	0	0	—	

First match(es) will be played: unknown. Source: Cricinfo
Rules for classification: 1) Points; 2) Wins; 3) Net run rate; 4) Results of games between tied teams; 5) T20I Rankings ahead of the tournament

=== Group D ===
Group D standings
Pos	Team	Pld	W	L	NR	Pts	NRR	Qualification
1	D1	0	0	0	0	0	—	Advance to the Super 10 stage
2	D2	0	0	0	0	0	—	Advance to the Super 10 stage
3	D3	0	0	0	0	0	—	
4	D4	0	0	0	0	0	—	

First match(es) will be played: unknown. Source: Cricinfo
Rules for classification: 1) Points; 2) Wins; 3) Net run rate; 4) Results of games between tied teams; 5) T20I Rankings ahead of the tournament

=== Group E ===
Group E standings
Pos	Team	Pld	W	L	NR	Pts	NRR	Qualification
1	E1	0	0	0	0	0	—	Advance to the Super 10 stage
2	E2	0	0	0	0	0	—	Advance to the Super 10 stage
3	E3	0	0	0	0	0	—	
4	E4	0	0	0	0	0	—	

First match(es) will be played: unknown. Source: Cricinfo
Rules for classification: 1) Points; 2) Wins; 3) Net run rate; 4) Results of games between tied teams; 5) T20I Rankings ahead of the tournament

== Super 10 stage ==
The top two teams from the five groups advance to the Super 10 stage, where they will be divided into two groups of five teams each. In the Super 10 stage, each team plays the others in their respective group in a round-robin format, with the top three teams from each group advancing to the knockout stage.

Qualification		Super 10 stage	
Qualification		Group 1	Group 2
Advanced from the group stage (Top 2 teams from each group)	A	To be determined	To be determined
Advanced from the group stage (Top 2 teams from each group)	B	To be determined	To be determined
Advanced from the group stage (Top 2 teams from each group)	C	To be determined	To be determined
Advanced from the group stage (Top 2 teams from each group)	D	To be determined	To be determined
Advanced from the group stage (Top 2 teams from each group)	E	To be determined	To be determined

=== Group 1 ===
Group 1 standings
Pos	Team	Pld	W	L	NR	Pts	NRR	Qualification
1	X1	0	0	0	0	0	—	Advance to the semi-finals
2	X2	0	0	0	0	0	—	Advance to the eliminators
3	X3	0	0	0	0	0	—	Advance to the eliminators
4	X4	0	0	0	0	0	—	
5	X5	0	0	0	0	0	—	

First match(es) will be played: unknown. Source: Cricinfo
Rules for classification: 1) Points; 2) Wins; 3) Net run rate; 4) Results of games between tied teams; 5) T20I Rankings ahead of the tournament

=== Group 2 ===
Group 2 standings
Pos	Team	Pld	W	L	NR	Pts	NRR	Qualification
1	Y1	0	0	0	0	0	—	Advance to the semi-finals
2	Y2	0	0	0	0	0	—	Advance to the eliminators
3	Y3	0	0	0	0	0	—	Advance to the eliminators
4	Y4	0	0	0	0	0	—	
5	Y5	0	0	0	0	0	—	

First match(es) will be played: unknown. Source: Cricinfo
Rules for classification: 1) Points; 2) Wins; 3) Net run rate; 4) Results of games between tied teams; 5) T20I Rankings ahead of the tournament

== Knockout stage ==
The knockout stage consists of two eliminators, two semi-finals and the final. Semi-finals will be played at Eden Park and Perth Stadium while, the final will be played at the Melbourne Cricket Ground. The winners of each Super 10 group will directly advance to the semi-finals, while the second-placed and third-placed teams would compete in two eliminator matches with the winners advancing to the semi-finals. The winners of the semi-finals will progress to the final.

=== Bracket ===
Eliminators
1-2	Group 1 second-placed
2-3	Group 2 third-placed
2-2	Group 2 second-placed
1-3	Group 1 third-placed

Semi-finals
1W	Group 1 winner
E1W	Eliminator 1 winner
2W	Group 2 winner
E2W	Eliminator 2 winner

Final
SF1W	Semi-final 1 winner
SF2W	Semi-final 2 winner

=== Eliminators ===
Eliminator 1
November 2028

To be determined	v	To be determined

Eliminator 2
November 2028

To be determined	v	To be determined

=== Semi-finals ===
Semi-final 1
November 2028

To be determined	v	To be determined

Semi-final 2
November 2028

To be determined	v	To be determined

=== Final ===
Final
12 November 2028

To be determined	v	To be determined

Melbourne Cricket Ground, Melbourne
