= 2013 Europe Twenty20 Division One =

2013 ICC European T20 Championship Division One
- Administrator: International Cricket Council
- Cricket format: 20-over
- Tournament format: Round-robin
- Host: England
- Champions: Italy (1st title)
- Participants: 12
- Matches: 42
- Most runs: (Denmark) Frederik Klokker (464)
- Most wickets: (Italy) Gayashan Munasinghe (13) (Italy) Carl Sandri (13)
- Official website: ICC European Championship

The 2013 ICC European Twenty20 Championship Division One was a cricket tournament that took place from 8–14 July 2013. It formed part of the European Cricket Championship. England hosted the event.

== Teams ==
Teams that qualified are as follows:

=== Group A ===
- Austria
- Gibraltar
- Guernsey
- Italy
- Norway
- Sweden

=== Group B ===
- Belgium
- Denmark
- France
- Germany
- Isle of Man
- Jersey

== Squads ==
The squads were released at CricketEurope4.net.

Austria	Belgium	Denmark	France
Amar Naeem (c, wk); Munir Ahmed; Imran Asif; Imran Goraya; Lakmal Kasthuri Arachchige; Satish Kaul; Shadnan Khan; Aamir Malik; Babar Nadeem; Armaan Randhawa; Mark Simpson-Parker; Nandeep Soggi; Daniel Stevenson; Satyam Subhash	Nirvam Shah (c); Gulfam Aziz; Shaheryar Butt; Jamie Farmiloe; Robert Sehmi; Faisal Khaliq; Amir Iqbal; Mahesh Krishnamoorthy; Shaival Mehta; Sheraz Sheikh Muhammad; Shahid Muhammad; Ali Raza (wk); Sharif Sohail Kalim; Waqas Shafiq	Michael Pedersen (c); Taha Ahmed; Aftab Ahmed; Anders Bülow; Bobby Chawla; Kasper Hansen; Frederik Klokker (wk); Rizwan Mahmood; Kamran Mahmood; Carsten Pedersen; Martin Pedersen; Basit Raja; Bashir Shah; Hamid Shah	Arun Ayyavooraju (c); Zika Ali; Waseem Bhatti (wk); Chetan Chauhan; Rory Gribbell; Usman Khan; Thomas Liddiard; Shahid Malik; Robin Joel Alexander Murphy; Usman Shahid; Ramesh Sithambaranathan; Williamdeep Singh; Sendhil Tambidoure; Komalan Thavalingam

Germany	Gibraltar	Guernsey	Isle of Man
Asif Khan (c); Nafees Ahmad; Imran Chaudhry; Demuni De Silver; Shakeel Hassan; Kashif Haider; Rana Javed Iqbal; Bilal Jafar; Kashif Mahmood; Rishi Pillai; A Malviya; Harmanjot Singh; Satyanarayana Srinivas (wk); KT Butt	Iain Latin (c); Charles Avellano; Mark Bacarese; Syed Jamshid Hussain Bokhari; David Coram; Ian Farrell; Julian Freyone; Kieron Ferrary (wk); Charles Harrison; Matthew Hunter; Kabir Mirpuri; Andrew Reyes; Kayron Stagno; Bryan Zammitt	James Nussbaumer (c); Lucas Barker; Matthew Breban; Isaac Damarell; Max Ellis; Jeremy Frith; David Hooper; Thomas Kimber (wk); Ross Kneller; Jordon Martel; Oliver Newey; GH Smit; Matthew Stokes; Christopher van Vliet	Luke Lacey (c); Matthew Ansell; Daniel Hawke; Christopher Hawke; Jaco Jansen; Philip Littlejohns (wk); Adam McAuley; Garreth Roome; Alexander Stokoe; Max Stokoe; Arne van den Berg; Carl Wagstaffe; Oliver Webster; Mark Williams

Italy	Jersey	Norway	Sweden
Damian Crowley (c); Din Alaud; Alessandro Bonora; Warnakulasuriya Fernando; Dilan Fernando; Luis di Giglio; Fida Hussain; Dinidu Marage; Gayashan Munasinghe; Damian Fernando; Andrew Northcote; Peter Petricola; Michael Raso; Carl Sandri	Peter Gough (c); Cornelis Bodenstein; Paul Connolly; Alexander Cooke; Andrew Dewhurst; Jake Dunford; Edward Farley (wk); Luke Gallichan; Anthony Hawkins-Kay; Ben Kynman; Thomas Minty; Paul McCafferty; Charles Perchard; Ben Stevens	Shahbaz Butt (c); Waheed Aamir; Tafseer Ali; Damon Crawford; Safir Hayat; Iftikhar Hussain; Suhail Iftikhar (wk); Ansar Iqbal; Hassan Khan; Santhos Kumar Rathakrishnarajah; Zeeshan Shahzad Siddiqui; Abidul Haq Safi; Ali Saleem; Ehtsham Ul-Haq	Muhammad Yasir Ikram (c); Naveed Anjum; Serge Conein; Mohammad Ashik Imtiaz; Sarmad Imtiaz Khan; Manuj Jadvest; Azam Khalil; Azam Mohammad; Muhammad Naveed; Shahid Sarwar; Sunny Sharma; Sandeep Sharma; Sadat Sidiqi (wk); Abdul Jalali Wakil

== Group stage ==
=== Group A ===
Team	P	W	L	T	NR	Points	NRR
Italy	5	5	0	0	0	10	3.771
Guernsey	5	4	1	0	0	8	1.128
Austria	5	2	3	0	0	4	-0.496
Norway	5	2	3	0	0	4	-0.831
Gibraltar	5	1	4	0	0	2	-1.605
Sweden	5	1	4	0	0	2	-2.044

==== Fixtures ====
8 July
10:00
(scorecard)

Italy; 213/3 (20 overs)	v	Sweden; 74 all out (17.4 overs)
Andrew Northcote 69 (38); Gayashan Munasinghe 3/16 (3.4 overs)		Wakil Jalali 12 (19); Serge Conein 1/21 (3 overs)

Italy won by 139 runs
Horsham Cricket Club Ground 1, Horsham
Umpires: Niels Bagh (Den) and Heath Kearns (Jer)
Player of the match: Andrew Northcote (Italy)

- Sweden won the toss and elected to field
- Points: Italy 2; Sweden 0

8 July
10:00
(scorecard)

Austria; 170/9 (20 overs)	v	Gibraltar; 156/6 (20 overs)
L. P. Kasturiarachchige 45 (31); Imran Goraya 2/22 (4 overs)		Mark Bacarese 44 (35); Iain Latin 3/28 (4 overs)

Austria won by 14 runs
Horsham Cricket Club Ground 2, Horsham
Umpires: Ashraf Din (Neth) and David Kenworthy (IOM)

- Gibraltar won the toss and elected to field
- Points: Austria 2; Gibraltar 0

8 July
14:30
(scorecard)

Norway; 159/7 (20 overs)	v	Guernsey; 163/3 (18.4 overs)
Ansar Iqbal 69 (58); Jeremy Frith 2/23 (4 overs)		Jeremy Frith 99* (59); Tafseer Ali 2/23 (4 overs)

Guernsey wins by 7 wickets
Horsham Cricket Club Ground 1, Horsham
Umpires: Huub Jansen and Heath Kearns (Jer)

- Norway won the toss and elected to bat

8 July
14:30
(scorecard)

Gibraltar; 95/5 (20 overs)	v	Italy; 96/0 (9 overs)
IDM Latin 27* (30); CS Sandri 3/27 (4 overs)		DA Marage 65* (31); Jawad Hussain 0/17 (1 over)

Italy won by 10 wickets.
Horsham Cricket Club Ground 2, Horsham
Umpires: MA Din, CA McElwee

- Gibraltar won the toss and elected to bat

9 July
10:00
(scorecard)

Norway; 159/6 (20 overs)	v	Sweden; 131/7 (20 overs)
Shahbaz Butt 33 (29); Muhammad Naveed 5/33 (4 overs)		Yasir Ikram 33 (17); Abidul Haq 3/21 (4 overs)

Norway won by 28 runs.
Preston Nomads Cricket Club Ground 1, Fulking
Umpires: NG Bagh, SG Chandiramani

- Norway won the toss and elected to bat

9 July
10:00
(scorecard)

Austria; 115 (19.4 overs)	v	Guernsey; 117/1 (13.5 overs)
A Randhawa 39 (24); JDJ Frith 3/12 (4 overs)		JDJ Frith 87 (47); DMM Stevenson 1/24 (4 overs)

Guernsey won by 9 wickets.
Preston Nomads Cricket Club Ground 2, Fulking
Umpires: RE Black, D Kenworthy

- Guernsey won the toss and elected to field

9 July
14:30
(scorecard)

Sweden; 176/6 (20 overs)	v	Gibraltar; 179/2 (19 overs)
Sadat Sidiqi 70 (44); IDM Latin 2/31 (4 overs)		K Stagno 93* (54); Jalali Wakil 1/16 (3 overs)

Gibraltar won by 8 wickets.
Preston Nomads Cricket Club Ground 1, Fulking
Umpires: N Bagh, Ashraf Din

- Gibraltar won the toss and elected to field

9 July
14:30
(scorecard)

Italy; 205/2 (20 overs)	v	Norway; 109/8 (20 overs)
DA Marage 107 (62); A Haq 1/37 (4 overs)		Iftikhar Suhail 27 (31); GRD Munasinghe 3/22 (4 overs)

Italy won by 96 runs.
Preston Nomads Cricket Club Ground 2, Fulking
Umpires: H Kearns, D Kenworthy

- Italy won the toss and elected to bat

11 July
10:00
(scorecard)

Sweden; 181/9 (20 overs)	v	Austria; 173/8 (20 overs)
A Imtiaz 50 (31); S Subhash 3/31 (3 overs)		I Asif 72 (54); S Conein 3/29 (4 overs)

Sweden won by 8 runs.
Horsham Cricket Club Ground 1, Horsham
Umpires: CA McElwee, J Wilson

- Austria won the toss and elected to field

11 July
10:00
(scorecard)

Italy; 162 (20 overs)	v	Guernsey; 133/8 (20 overs)
PA Petricola 69 (30); M Ellis 4/15 (4 overs)		JDJ Frith 35 (30); DG Crowley 2/15 (4 overs)

Italy won by 29 runs.
Horsham Cricket Club Ground 2, Horsham
Umpires: SG Chandiramani, AJT Dowdalls

- Italy won the toss and elected to bat

11 July
14:30
(scorecard)

Gibraltar; 116/5 (20 overs)	v	Guernsey; 117/2 (14.2 overs)
KJ Ferrary 29 (35); JAJ Nussbaumer 1/6 (4 overs)		LJ Barker 51* (47); K Mirpuri 1/23 (3.2 overs)

Guernsey won by 8 wickets.
Horsham Cricket Club Ground 1, Horsham
Umpires: H Kearns, J Wilson

- Guernsey won the toss and elected to field

11 July
14:30
(scorecard)

Norway; 177/8 (20 overs)	v	Austria; 180/4 (19.2 overs)
A Iqbal 36 (32); Shahbaz Butt 3/30 (4 overs)		LP Kasturiarachchige 50 (30); I Asif 2/13 (2 overs)

Austria won by 6 wickets.
Horsham Cricket Club Ground 2, Horsham
Umpires: SG Chandiramani, D Kenworthy

- Austria won the toss and elected to field

12 July
10:00
(scorecard)

Norway; 169/8 (20 overs)	v	Gibraltar; 160/3 (20 overs)
E Ul Haq 42 (32); MO Bacarese 4/24 (4 overs)		MO Bacarese 50* (29); Ali Saleem 1/18 (3 overs)

Norway won by 9 runs.
Horsham Cricket Club Ground 1, Horsham
Umpires: RE Black, H Kearns

12 July
14:00
(scorecard)

Italy; 142/9 (20 overs)	v	Austria; 131 (18.5 overs)
CS Sandri 39 (24); I Goraya 4/24 (4 overs)		S Kaul 44 (27); DG Crowley 3/17 (4 overs)

Italy won by 11 runs.
Horsham Cricket Club Ground 1, Horsham
Umpires: RE Black, MA Din

12 July
14:00
(scorecard)

Sweden; 132/6 (20 overs)	v	Guernsey; 134/3 (16.3 overs)
S Sharma 51* (38); JDJ Frith 2/26 (4 overs)		GH Smit 51* (46); S Conein 1/22 (3 overs)

Guernsey won by 7 wickets.
Horsham Cricket Club Ground 2, Horsham
Umpires: NG Bagh, H Jansen

- Sweden won the toss and elected to bat

=== Group B ===
Team	P	W	L	T	NR	Points	NRR
Denmark	5	5	0	0	0	10	3.399
Jersey	5	4	1	0	0	8	0.796
France	5	3	2	0	0	6	-0.680
Germany	5	1	4	0	0	2	-0.725
Isle of Man	5	1	4	0	0	2	-0.990
Belgium	5	1	4	0	0	2	-1.807

==== Fixtures ====
8 July
10:00
(scorecard)

Isle of Man; 121 (20 overs)	v	Denmark; 124/3 (17.4 overs)
J Jansen 43 (39); AB Chawla 4/23 (4 overs)		CR Pedersen 47* (41); DJ Hawke 2/24 (4 overs)

Denmark won by 7 wickets.
Preston Nomads Cricket Club Ground 1, Fulking
Umpires: AJT Dowdalls, AJ Neill

- Isle of Man won the toss and elected to bat

8 July
10:00
(scorecard)

Belgium; 163/7 (20 overs)	v	Germany; 152/9 (20 overs)
Shaheryar Butt 55 (35); Nafees Ahmad 2/25 (4 overs)		Kashif Haider 24* (7); S Mehta 3/34 (4 overs)

Belgium won by 11 runs.
Preston Nomads Cricket Club Ground 2, Fulking
Umpires: SG Chandiramani, RP Smith

- Belgium won the toss and elected to bat

8 July
14:30
(scorecard)

France; 112 (18.3 overs)	v	Jersey; 115/2 (13.5 overs)
Waseem Bhatti 37 (25); AW Hawkins-Kay 3/10 (3 overs)		BDH Stevens 50* (34); Usman Khan 1/17 (2 overs)

Jersey won by 8 wickets
Preston Nomads Cricket Club Ground 1, Fulking
Umpires: AJ Neill, RE Black

- Jersey won the toss and elected to field

8 July
14:30
(scorecard)

Denmark; 161/7 (20 overs)	v	Germany; 105 (17.4 overs)
FA Klokker 75 (47); Shakeel Hassan 2/14 (4 overs)		R Pillai 28 (22); Bashir Shah 3/16 (4 overs)

Denmark won by 56 runs.
Preston Nomads Cricket Club Ground 2, Fulking
Umpires: RP Smith, JD Wilson

- Denmark won the toss and elected to bat

9 July
10:00
(scorecard)

France; 197/5 (20 overs)	v	Isle of Man; 177/5 (20 overs)
K Thavalingam 87 (44); DJ Hawke 1/21 (2 overs)		P Littlejohns 81* (58); RP Gribbell 1/17 (2 overs)

France won by 20 runs.
Horsham Cricket Club Ground 1, Horsham
Umpires: CA McElwee, RP Smith

- France won the toss and elected to bat

9 July
10:00
(scorecard)

Belgium; 134 (20 overs)	v	Jersey; 135/2 (15 overs)
Waqas Shafiq 39 (33); PCC Connolly 3/20 (4 overs)		BDH Stevens 50* (32); S Muhammad 1/10 (2 overs)

Jersey won by 8 wickets.
Horsham Cricket Club Ground 2, Horsham
Umpires: AJT Dowdalls, H Jansen

- Jersey won the toss and elected to field

9 July
14:30
(scorecard)

Isle of Man; 122/9 (20 overs)	v	Germany; 125/5 (16.1 overs)
P Littlejohns 35 (27); Shakeel Hassan 3/21 (4 overs)		S Srinivas 21* (21) van den Berg 2/17 (4 overs)

Germany won by 5 wickets.
Horsham Cricket Club Ground 1, Horsham
Umpires: A Neill, C McElwee

- Isle of Man won the toss and elected to bat

9 July
14:30
(scorecard)

Denmark; 185/4 (20 overs)	v	France; 96 (19.1 overs)
Aftab Ahmed 54* (35); C Chauhan 2/26 (3 overs)		K Thavalingam 27 (23); KT Mahmood 4/8 (3.1 overs)

Denmark won by 89 runs.
Horsham Cricket Club Ground 1, Horsham
Umpires: AJT Dowdalls, J Wilson

- Denmark won the toss and elected to bat

11 July
10:00
(scorecard)

Belgium; 119 (20 overs)	v	Isle of Man; 120/5 (19.2 overs)
N Shah 35 (35); ADL Stokoe 5/21 (4 overs)		MJL Stokoe 38 (56); S Mehta 2/20 (3 overs)

Isle of Man won by 8 wickets.
Preston Nomads Cricket Club Ground 1, Fulking
Umpires: R Black, RP Smith

- Isle of Man won the toss and elected to field

11 July
10:00
(scorecard)

Denmark; 164/5 (20 overs)	v	Jersey; 116/9 (20 overs)
FA Klokker 41 (30); LE Gallichan 2/16 (4 overs)		ASJ Dewhurst 38 (36); HAM Shah 3/25 (4 overs)

Denmark won by 48 runs.
Preston Nomads Cricket Club Ground 2, Fulking
Umpires: MA Din, H Jansen

- Jersey won the toss and elected to field

11 July
14:30
(scorecard)

Jersey; 166/5 (20 overs)	v	Germany; 159/6 (20 overs)
PW Gough 41 (33); Kashif Haider 2/41 (4 overs)		Kashif Mahmood 37 (34); CJ Bodenstein 2/28 (4 overs)

Jersey won by 7 runs.
Preston Nomads Cricket Club Ground 1, Fulking
Umpires: NG Bagh, R Black

- Jersey won the toss and elected to bat

11 July
14:30
(scorecard)

France; 121 (17.5 overs)	v	Belgium; 99 (19 overs)
Waseem Bhatti 55 (45); S Muhammad 3/19 (4 overs)		Sheraz Sheikh 18 (28); Usman Khan 4/18 (3 overs)

France won by 22 runs.
Preston Nomads Cricket Club Ground 2, Fulking
Umpires: H Jansen, A Neill

- France won the toss and elected to bat

12 July
10:00
(scorecard)

France; 152/3 (20 overs)	v	Germany; 124/9 (20 overs)
Waseem Bhatti 45* (43); Shakeel Hassan 1/15 (4 overs)		K Mahmood 32 (24); Shahid Malik 3/19 (4 overs)

France won by 28 runs.
Preston Nomads Cricket Club Ground 1, Fulking
Umpires: SG Chandiramani, AJ Neill

- Germany won the toss and elected to field

12 July
14:00
(scorecard)

Denmark; 199/4 (20 overs)	v	Belgium; 75/9 (20 overs)
FA Klokker 87 (46); Waqas Shafiq 1/27 (3 overs)		N Shah 18 (20); Bashir Shah 4/17 (4 overs)

Denmark won by 124 runs.
Preston Nomads Cricket Club Ground 1, Fulking
Umpires: SG Chandiramani, JD Wilson

- Denmark won the toss and elected to bat.

12 July
14:00
(scorecard)

Jersey; 141 (20 overs)	v	Isle of Man; 109/8 (20 overs)
BDH Stevens 28 (18); ADL Stokoe 3/12 (4 overs)		L Lacey 35 (36); C Bodenstein 3/27 (4 overs)

Jersey won by 32 runs.
Preston Nomads Cricket Club Ground 2, Fulking
Umpires: AJT Dowdalls, CA McElwee

== Play-offs ==
Play-offs are scheduled for 13 July; 14 July is a "Reserve Day", if needed.

=== 11th-12th Place Play-off Semi-Final ===
13 July
11:00

Belgium; 153/7 (20 overs)	v	Sweden; 157/5 (19.1 overs)
N Shah 48 (43); SF Conein 2/29 (4 overs)		Sadat Sidiqi 59 (41); Sheraz Sheikh 2/18 (4 overs)

Sweden won by 5 wickets.
Blackstone Ground 2, Woodmancote
Umpires: D Kenworthy, CA McElwee

- Sweden won the toss and elected to field

=== 9th-10th Place Play-off Semi-Final ===
13 July
14:30

Gibraltar; 110/7 (20 overs)	v	Isle of Man; 114/3 (17.3 overs)
KJ Ferrary 28* (29); A van den Berg 3/9 (4 overs)		J Jansen 46* (40); JD Freyone 1/12 (1 over)

Isle of Man won by 7 wickets.
Blackstone Ground 2, Woodmancote
Umpires: MA Din, JD Wilson

- Gibraltar won the toss and elected to bat

=== 7th-8th Place Play-off Semi-Final ===
13 July
14:30

Germany; 162/6 (20 overs)	v	Norway; 161/8 (20 overs)
A Khan 55 (35); D Crawford 2/11 (4 overs)		Iftikhar Hussain 54 (33); Harmanjot Singh 2/29 (3 overs)

Germany won by 1 run.
Blackstone Ground 1, Woodmancote
Umpires: SG Chandiramani, H Kearns

- Germany won the toss and elected to bat

=== 5th-6th Place Play-off Semi-Final ===
13 July
11:00

France; 151/6 (20 overs)	v	Austria; 67 (15.2 overs)
AK Ayyavooraju 59 (54); LP Kasthuriarachchi 2/23 (4 overs)		LP Kasthuriarachchi 19 (11); W Singh 4/16 (4 overs)

France won by 84 runs.
Blackstone Ground 1, Woodmancote
Umpires: NG Bagh, RE Black

- France won the toss and elected to bat

=== Semi-final ===
13 July
11:00

Italy; 120/9 (20 overs)	v	Jersey; 114/9 (20 overs)
DA Marage 42 (36); BDH Stevens 3/21 (4 overs)		DSF Arsakulasuriya 2/17 (3 overs); PW Gough 41 (52)

Italy won by 6 runs.
County Ground, Hove
Umpires: RP Smith, H Jansen

- Italy won the toss and elected to bat

13 July
14:30

Denmark; 226/3 (20 overs)	v	Guernsey; 113/9 (20 overs)
FA Klokker 129* (65); Ellis 2/42 (4 overs)		GH Smit 23 (18); Javed 3/15 (4 overs)

Denmark won by 113 runs.
County Ground, Hove
Umpires: A Neill, H Jansen

- Denmark won the toss and elected to bat.

=== Final ===
13 July
18:45

Italy; 215/3 (20 overs)	v	Denmark; 197/8 (20 overs)
A Northcote 68* (41); Chawla 1/27 (4 overs)		KT Mahmood 58 (31); Marage 2/37 (4 overs)

Italy won by 18 runs.
County Ground, Hove
Umpires: A Neill, R Smith

- Italy won the toss and elected to bat

== Final Placings ==
Pos	Team	Promotion/Relegation
1st	Italy	Promoted to 2013 ICC World Twenty20 Qualifier and qualify for 2015 ICC Europe Division One
2nd	Denmark	Promoted to 2013 ICC World Twenty20 Qualifier and qualify for 2015 ICC Europe Division One
3rd	Guernsey	Qualify for 2015 ICC Europe Division One
4th	Jersey	Qualify for 2015 ICC Europe Division One
5th	France	Qualify for 2015 ICC Europe Division One
6th	Austria	Relegated to 2014 ICC Europe Division Two
7th	Germany	Relegated to 2014 ICC Europe Division Two
8th	Norway	Relegated to 2014 ICC Europe Division Two
9th	Isle of Man	Relegated to 2014 ICC Europe Division Two
10th	Gibraltar	Relegated to 2014 ICC Europe Division Two
11th	Sweden	Relegated to 2014 ICC Europe Division Three
12th	Belgium	Relegated to 2014 ICC Europe Division Three

== See also ==
- 2013 ICC World Twenty20 Qualifier
- European Cricket Championship
