= 2015 Europe Twenty20 Division One =

2015 ICC Europe Division One
- Dates: 9 – 13 May 2015
- Administrator: International Cricket Council
- Cricket format: 20-over
- Tournament format: Round-robin
- Host: Jersey
- Champions: Jersey (1st title)
- Runners-up: Denmark
- Participants: 6
- Matches: 15
- Most runs: (Denmark) Freddie Klokker (204)
- Most wickets: (Italy) Carl Sandri (12)

The 2015 ICC Europe Division One was a cricket tournament held in Jersey from 9–13 May 2015. The tournament was organised by ICC Europe, and featured the top six associate members in that region – Denmark, France, Guernsey, Italy, Jersey, and Norway. Ireland, the Netherlands, and Scotland had already qualified for the World Twenty20 Qualifier, while England qualify for the World Twenty20 automatically.

The host, Jersey, won the tournament on net run rate from Denmark, its first title. The leading runscorer at the tournament was Danish batsman Freddie Klokker, while the leading wicket taker was Italian bowler Carl Sandri. By winning the tournament, Jersey qualified for the 2015 World Twenty20 Qualifier in Ireland and Scotland. The top six teams at that tournament, where matches will have full Twenty20 status, will qualify for the 2016 ICC World Twenty20 in India.

== Squads ==
Squads for the tournament were announced on 27 April 2015.

Denmark Coach: Jeremy Bray	France Coach: Tim de Leede	Guernsey Coach: Nic Pothas
Michael Pedersen (c); Saif Ahmad; Aftab Ahmed; Mads Henriksen; Yasir Iqbal; Zahmeer Khan; Frederik Klokker; Amjad Khan; Kamran Mahmood; Basit Raja; Hamid Shah; Syed Shah; Zishan Shah; Anique Uddin	Arun Ayyavooraju (c); Zika Ali; Waseem Bhatti; Chetan Chauhan; Rameez Ehsan; Arslan Khan; Usman Khan; Thomas Liddiard; Shahid Malik; Robin Murphy; Hamza Niaz; Williamdeep Singh; Kismatullah Surate; Atif Zahir	Jamie Nussbaumer (c); Alex Bushell; Josh Butler; Isaac Damarell; Max Ellis; Ben Ferbrache; David Hooper; Thomas Kimber; Jordon Martel; Jason Martin; Oliver Newey; Oliver Nightingale; Tim Ravenscroft; Matthew Stokes
Italy Coach: Joe Scuderi	Jersey Coach: Neil MacRae	Norway Coach: Muhammad Haroon
Damian Crowley (c); Roshendra Abeywickrama; Damian Fernando; Dilan Fernando; Luis di Giglio; Tharindu Fernando; Fida Hussain; Dinidu Marage; Andrew Northcote; Joy Perera; Peter Petricola; Michael Raso; Carl Sandri; Rizwan Tanweer	Peter Gough (c); Corey Bisson; Dominic Blampied; Cornelis Bodenstein; Edward Farley; Anthony Hawkins-Kay; Jonty Jenner; Ben Kynman; Thomas Minty; Charles Perchard; Rhys Palmer; Benjamin Rive; Ben Stevens; Nathaniel Watkins	Sufyan Saleem (c); Shahid Ahmad; Sheheryar Akbar; Shahbaz Butt; Damon Crawford; Safir Hayat; Suhail Iftikhar; Ansar Iqbal; Shehraz Khalid; Mofassar Saeed; Ali Tafseer; Pratheesh Thangavadivel; Ehtsham-ul-Haq; Shahzad Umran

== Preparation ==
Jersey's preparation for the tournament consisted of three twenty-over fixtures against Dutch teams, all played at the VRA Ground in Amstelveen in late April. They defeated a Netherlands A side by 62 runs, and then played matches against the two Dutch sides in the North Sea Pro Series, defeating the Hurricanes by 68 runs and losing to the Seafarers by seven wickets. Similarly, France's preparation included twenty-over fixtures against the Hurricanes and the Seafarers, both played on 2 May at Sportpark Maarschalkerweerd, Utrecht. They defeated the Hurricanes by 14 runs, and lost to the Seafarers in a super over, necessitated after an initial tie.

Denmark, coached by former Irish international Jeremy Bray, played several fixtures in Ireland in mid-April. They lost to the Irish under-19 side by seven wickets and lost both games against Leinster Lightning, but did win a fixture against The Hills Cricket Club by seven runs. Guernsey, coached by former South African international Nic Pothas, attended a training camp at the County Ground, Hove, and subsequently played fixtures against a Sussex County Cricket Club academy team and a Sussex Cricket League representative team.

== Points table ==
Pos	Team	Pld	W	L	T	NR	Pts	NRR
1	Jersey	5	4	1	0	0	8	1.556
2	Denmark	5	4	1	0	0	8	0.779
3	Italy	5	3	2	0	0	6	1.502
4	Guernsey	5	3	2	0	0	6	−0.040
5	Norway	5	1	4	0	0	2	−2.599
6	France	5	0	5	0	0	0	−1.090

Source: Cricket Europe at the Wayback Machine (archived 23 September 2015)

== Matches ==
9 May
10:30
Scorecard

Jersey; 236/5 (20 overs)	v	Norway; 128/9 (20 overs)

Jersey won by 108 runs
Farmers Cricket Ground

9 May
10:30
Scorecard

Denmark; 110 (19.1 overs)	v	Guernsey; 131/7 (20 overs)

Guernsey won by 21 runs
Grainville Cricket Ground

9 May
10:30
Scorecard

France; 150/8 (20 overs)	v	Italy; 151/4 (19 overs)

Italy won by 6 wickets
FB Playing Fields

9 May
15:30
Scorecard

Jersey; 159/6 (19.5 overs)	v	Italy; 155/4 (20 overs)

Jersey won by 4 wickets
Farmers Cricket Ground

9 May
15:30
Scorecard

Guernsey; 172/8 (20 overs)	v	Norway; 149/6 (20 overs)

Guernsey won by 23 runs
Grainville Cricket Ground

9 May
15:30
Scorecard

Denmark; 118/2 (12.5 overs)	v	France; 117/7 (20 overs)

Denmark won by 8 wickets
FB Playing Fields

11 May
10:30
Scorecard

Italy; 214/5 (20 overs)	v	Norway; 74/9 (20 overs)

Italy won by 140 runs
Farmers Cricket Ground

11 May
10:30
Scorecard

Jersey; 119/7 (20 overs)	v	Denmark; 123/3 (16.4 overs)

Denmark won by 7 wickets
Grainville Cricket Ground

11 May
10:30
Scorecard

France; 124/7 (20 overs)	v	Guernsey; 128/5 (18.4 overs)

Guernsey won by 5 wickets
FB Playing Fields

11 May
15:30
Scorecard

Guernsey; 122 (19.4 overs)	v	Italy; 123/5 (17.2 overs)

Italy won by 5 wickets
Farmers Cricket Ground

11 May
15:30
Scorecard

Jersey; 144/8 (20 overs)	v	France; 125/6 (20 overs)

Jersey won by 19 runs
Grainville Cricket Ground

11 May
15:30
Scorecard

Norway; 139/9 (20 overs)	v	Denmark; 140/7 (19.4 overs)

Denmark won by 3 wickets
FB Playing Fields

13 May
10:30
Scorecard

Jersey; 125/6 (14.3 overs)	v	Guernsey; 121/9 (20 overs)

Jersey won by 4 wickets
Farmers Cricket Ground

13 May
10:30
Scorecard

Denmark; 142/6 (20 overs)	v	Italy; 126/9 (20 overs)

Denmark won by 16 runs
Grainville Cricket Ground

13 May
10:30
Scorecard

France; 101 (18.4 overs)	v	Norway; 116/9 (20 overs)

Norway won by 15 runs
FB Playing Fields

== Statistics ==
=== Most runs ===
The top five run scorers (total runs) are included in this table.

Player	Team	Runs	Inns	Avg	S/R	Highest	100s	50s
Frederik Klokker	Denmark	204	4	51.00	128.30	82	0	2
Peter Petricola	Italy	182	5	36.40	134.81	70	0	2
Thomas Kimber	Guernsey	167	5	33.40	122.79	87	0	2
Jonty Jenner	Jersey	160	5	32.00	177.78	81	0	1
Damian Crowley	Italy	153	5	38.25	98.08	54*	0	1

Source: CricHQ

=== Most wickets ===
The top five wicket takers are listed in this table, listed by wickets taken and then by bowling average.

Player	Team	Overs	Wkts	Ave	SR	Econ	BBI
Carl Sandri	Italy	20.0	12	9.92	10.00	5.95	3/28
Nat Watkins	Jersey	18.0	10	10.00	10.80	5.56	4/18
Bashir Shah	Denmark	20.0	9	12.89	13.33	5.80	3/22
David Hooper	Guernsey	17.0	8	13.25	12.75	6.24	2/16
Safir Hayat	Norway	16.0	8	18.88	12.00	9.44	3/30

Source: CricHQ

== Final standings ==
Position	Team	Status
1	Jersey	Qualified for 2015 ICC World Twenty20 Qualifier
2	Denmark	
3	Italy	
4	Guernsey	
5	Norway	
6	France	

== ICC Europe World Cricket League Division Six Qualifier ==
Along with the Twenty20 tournament, two teams, France and Norway played each other in one-off 50-over match for a qualification spot in 2015 ICC World Cricket League Division Six.

15 May 2015
Scorecard

Norway; 236 (50 overs)	v	France; 139 (33 overs)

Norway won by 97 runs
FB Playing Fields, Jersey
