= 2014 ICC World Cricket League Division Four =

Cricket tournament

- Dates: 21 June – 28 June 2014
- Administrator(s): International Cricket Council
- Cricket format: Limited overs cricket
- Tournament format(s): Round-robin and Knockout
- Host(s): Singapore
- Participants: 6
- Matches: 18

The 2014 ICC World Cricket League Division Four was a cricket tournament which took place in Singapore from 21 to 28 June 2014. It formed part of the ICC World Cricket League and qualification for the 2019 Cricket World Cup.

== Teams ==
The teams that took part in the tournament were decided according to the results of the 2012 ICC World Cricket League Division Four, the 2013 ICC World Cricket League Division Three and the 2014 ICC World Cricket League Division Five.

Team	Last outcome
Oman	5th in 2013 ICC World Cricket League Division Three (relegated)
Italy	6th in 2013 ICC World Cricket League Division Three (relegated)
Singapore	3rd in 2012 ICC World Cricket League Division Four
Denmark	4th in 2012 ICC World Cricket League Division Four
Jersey	1st in 2014 ICC World Cricket League Division Five (promoted)
Malaysia	2nd in 2014 ICC World Cricket League Division Five (promoted)

== Venues ==
- Kallang Ground
- Singapore Cricket Club Ground
- Indian Association Ground

== Squads ==
Denmark	Italy	Jersey	Malaysia	Oman	Singapore
Michael Pedersen (c); Aftab Ahmed; Shehzad Ahmed; Anders Bülow; Yasir Iqbal; Raja Basit Javed; Amjad Khan; Zameer Khan; Frederik Klokker (wk); Kamran Tariq Mahmood; Rizwan Tariq Mahmood; Hamid Shah; Syed Bashir Shah; Zishan Shah	Damian Crowley (c); Dilan Arsakulasuriya; Alessandro Bonora; Gayashan De Silva Munasinghe; Luis di Giglio; Muthunama Fernando; Warnakulasuriya Fernando; Fida Hussain; Dinidu Marage; Andrew Northcote; Vince Pennazza; Bentota Perera; Michael Raso; Carl Sandri	Peter Gough (c); Corey Bisson; Cornelis Bodenstein; Andy Dewhurst; Sam Dewhurst; Jame Duckett; Edward Farley; Anthony Hawkins-Kay; Jonty Jenner; Tom Minty; Dean Morrison; Charles Perchard; Ben Stevens; Nat Watkins	Ahmed Faiz (c); Anwar Arudin; Hammadullah Khan; Hassan Ghulam; Irfan Zarbani; Khizar Hayat; Abdul Mohammad; Shukri Nasir Shafiq; Suresh Navaratnam; Aminuddin Ramly; Shafiq Sharif; Shahrulnizam Yusof; Suhan Alagaratnam; Suharril Fetri	Sultan Ahmed (c); Aamir Kaleem; Adnan Ilyas; Aamer Ali; Munis Ansari; Arif Hussain; Jatinder Singh; Ajay Lalcheta; Mohammad Nadeem; Rajeshkumar Ranpura; Sufyan Mehmood; Vaibhav Wategaonkar; Zeeshan Maqsood; Zeeshan Siddiqui	Saad Janjua (c); Abhiraj Singh; Amjad Mahboob; Suresh Appusamy; Andre de Lange; Mulewa Dharmichand; Rezza Gaznavi; Archit Goenka; Christopher Janik; Chaminda Ruwan; Arjun Mutreja; Kshitij Shinde; Chetan Suryawanshi; Selladore Vijaykumar

== Round robin ==
=== Points table ===
Pos	Team	Pld	W	L	T	NR	Pts	NRR	Promotion or relegation
1	Singapore	5	4	1	0	0	8	0.170	Met in the final and promoted to Division Three for 2014
2	Malaysia	5	4	1	0	0	8	0.117	Met in the final and promoted to Division Three for 2014
3	Denmark	5	3	2	0	0	6	0.710	Met in the 3rd place playoff and remained in Division Four for 2016
4	Italy	5	2	3	0	0	4	−0.020	Met in the 3rd place playoff and remained in Division Four for 2016
5	Oman	5	1	4	0	0	2	0.003	Met in the 5th place playoff and relegated to Division Five for 2016
6	Jersey	5	1	4	0	0	2	−0.974	Met in the 5th place playoff and relegated to Division Five for 2016

=== Matches ===
21 June
Scorecard

Denmark; 268/8 (50.0 overs)	v	Singapore; 198 (41.1 overs)
Freddie Klokker 61(60); Yasir Iqbal 4/29 (8 overs)		Chaminda Ruwan 72(97); Amjad Mahboob 2/44 (9 overs)

Denmark won by 70 runs
Kallang
Umpires: Allan Haggo (Scotland) and Ruchira Palliyaguruge (Sri Lanka)
Player of the match: Yasir Iqbal (Denmark)

- Singapore won the toss and elected to bat

21 June
Scorecard

Oman; 212/9 (50.0 overs)	v	Italy; 213/7 (49.0 overs)
Ajay Lalcheta 43(35); Zeeshan Maqsood 2/24 (10 overs)		Damian Crowley 62(93); Gayashan Munasinghe 2/21 (8 overs)

Italy won by 3 wickets
Singapore Cricket Club Ground
Umpires: Ahmed Shah Pakteen (Afghanistan) and Akbar Ali (United Arab Emirates)
Player of the match: Damian Crowley (Italy)

- Oman won the toss and elected to bat

21 June
Scorecard

Jersey; 180/9 (50.0 overs)	v	Malaysia; 184/7 (47.4 overs)
Peter Gough 60(91); Nat Watkins 3/40 (10 overs)		Nasir Shafiq 95*(104); Shahrulnizam Yusof 4/32 (10 overs)

Malaysia won by 3 wickets
Indian Association
Umpires: Ahmed Shah Durrani (Afghanistan) and Nigel Morrison (Vanuatu)
Player of the match: Nasir Shafiq (Malaysia)

- Jersey won the toss and elected to bat

22 June
Scorecard

Denmark; 171/8 (43/43 overs)	v	Malaysia; 173/4 (38/43 overs)
Freddie Klokker 29(41); Suharril Fetri 2/22 (6 overs)		Ahmed Faiz 68(90); Amjad Khan 1/26 (9 overs)

Malaysia won by 6 wickets
Kallang
Umpires: Akbar Ali (United Arab Emirates) and Allan Haggo (Scotland)
Player of the match: Ahmed Faiz (Malaysia)

- Malaysia won the toss and chose to field

22 June
Scorecard

Jersey; 185 (49.5 overs)	v	Oman; 189/3 (33.5 overs)
Jonty Jenner 55(54); Zeeshan Maqsood 3/27 (10 overs)		Zeeshan Siddiqui 87*(105); Cornelis Bodenstein 1/24 (4 overs)

Oman won by 7 wickets
Singapore Cricket Club Ground
Umpires: Ahmed Shah Durrani (Afghanistan) and Clive Howard (Hong Kong)
Player of the match: Zeeshan Siddiqui (Oman)

- Jersey won the toss and chose to bat

22 June
Scorecard

Italy; 173/8 (40/40 overs)	v	Singapore; 174/1 (34.2/40 overs)
Fida Hussain 44(38); Selladore Vijayakumar 2/26 (8 overs)		Chetan Suryawanshi 96*(81); Gayashan Munasinghe 1/44 (7.2 overs)

Singapore won by 9 wickets
Indian Association
Umpires: Ahmed Shah Pakteen (Afghanistan) and Ruchira Palliyaguruge (Sri Lanka)
Player of the match: Chetan Suryawanshi (Singapore)

- Italy won the toss and chose to bat

24 June
Scorecard

Italy; 147/9 (40/40 overs)	v	Jersey; 148/7 (37/40 overs)
Damian Crowley 44(74); Nat Watkins 2/24 (8 overs)		Peter Gough 61(92); Gayashan Munasinghe 2/26 (8 overs)

Jersey won by 3 wickets
Kallang
Umpires: Ahmed Shah Pakteen (Afghanistan) and Nigel Morrison (Vanuatu)
Player of the match: Peter Gough (Jersey)

- Jersey won the toss and chose to field

24 June
Scorecard

Singapore; 208/9 (50.0 overs)	v	Malaysia; 160 (44.0 overs)
Christopher Janik 49(64); Hassan Ghulam 3/39 (10 overs)		Nasir Shafiq 69(122); Abhiraj Singh 3/25 (6 overs)

Singapore won by 48 runs
Singapore Cricket Club Ground
Umpires: Akbar Ali (United Arab Emirates) and Clive Howard (Hong Kong)
Player of the match: Nasir Shafiq (Malaysia)

- Malaysia won the toss and chose to field

24 June
Scorecard

Denmark; 137 (33.1/34 overs)	v	Oman; 124 (31.2/34 overs)
Freddie Klokker 46(37); Ajay Lalcheta 2/18 (7 overs)		Adnan Ilyas 25(49); Zishan Shah 3/15 (4 overs)

Denmark won by 13 runs
Indian Association
Umpires: Ahmed Shah Durrani (Afghanistan) and Ruchira Palliyaguruge (Sri Lanka)
Player of the match: Zishan Shah (Denmark)

- Oman won the toss and chose to field

25 June
Scorecard

Oman; 186/8 (50.0 overs)	v	Singapore; 187/8 (45.4 overs)
Amir Ali 50(51); Mulewa Dharmichand 4/21 (10 overs)		Chaminda Ruwan 81(131); Ajay Lalcheta 5/20 (10 overs)

Singapore won by 2 wickets
Kallang
Umpires: Ahmed Shah Durrani (Afghanistan) and Allan Haggo (Scotland)
Player of the match: Chaminda Ruwan (Singapore)

- Singapore won the toss and elected to field

25 June
Scorecard

Denmark; 270 (49.5 overs)	v	Jersey; 136 (39.0 overs)
Freddie Klokker 80(100); Nat Watkins 4/49 (9 overs)		Peter Gough 33(32); Basit Raja 3/26 (8 overs)

Denmark won by 134 runs
Singapore Cricket Club Ground
Umpires: Clive Howard (Hong Kong) and Ruchira Palliyaguruge (Sri Lanka)
Player of the match: Freddie Klokker (Denmark)

- Denmark won the toss and elected to bat

25 June
Scorecard

Malaysia; 240/9 (50 overs)	v	Italy; 234 (48.3 overs)
Ahmed Faiz 51(98); Vince Pennazza 4/42 (10 overs)		Alessandro Bonora 68(119); Shahrulnizam Yusof 5/49 (10 overs)

Malaysia won by 6 runs
Indian Association
Umpires: Akbar Ali (United Arab Emirates) and Nigel Morrison (Vanuatu)
Player of the match: Shahrulnizam Yusof (Malaysia)

- Italy won the toss and elected to field

27 June
Scorecard

Oman; 198 (49.4 overs)	v	Malaysia; 201/4 (42.4 overs)
Sultan Ahmed 55(73); Shahrulnizam Yusof 3/24 (6 overs)		Ahmed Faiz 70* (93); Amir Ali 2/39 (7 overs)

Malaysia won by 6 wickets
Kallang
Umpires: Akbar Ali (United Arab Emirates) and Ruchira Palliyaguruge (Sri Lanka)
Player of the match: Ahmed Faiz (Malaysia)

- Malaysia won the toss and chose to field

27 June
Scorecard

Denmark; 236/8 (50 overs)	v	Italy; 237/4 (42.0 overs)
Amjad Khan 73(73); Gayashan Munasinghe 4/52 (10 overs)		Dinidu Marage 82(78); Amjad Khan 2/55 (10 overs)

Italy won by 6 wickets
Singapore Cricket Club Ground
Umpires: Allan Haggo (Scotland) and Nigel Morrison (Vanuatu)
Player of the match: Dinidu Marage (Italy)

- Denmark won the toss and chose to bat

27 June
Scorecard

Singapore; 227/5 (46.5 overs)	v	Jersey; 224 (49.4 overs)
Chaminda Ruwan 112(140); Cornelis Bodenstein 3/47 (8 overs)		Dean Morrison 77(93); Abhiraj Singh 4/34 (10 overs)

Singapore won by 5 wickets
Indian Association
Umpires: Ahmed Shah Pakteen (Afghanistan) and Clive Howard (Hong Kong)
Player of the match: Chaminda Ruwan (Singapore)

- Singapore won the toss and chose to field

== Playoffs ==
=== 5th-place playoff ===
28 June
Scorecard

Oman; 246 (49.0 overs)	v	Jersey; 210 (45.3 overs)
Jatinder Singh 90 (110); Charles Perchard 3/34 (8 overs)		Edward Farley 55 (90); Ajay Lalcheta 3/30 (9 overs)

Oman won by 36 runs
Indian Association
Umpires: Ahmed Shah Pakteen (Afghanistan) and Clive Howard (Hong Kong)
Player of the match: Jatinder Singh (Oman)

- Jersey won the toss and chose to field

=== 3rd-place playoff ===
28 June
Scorecard

Denmark; 275/9 (50 overs)	v	Italy; 240/9 (50 overs)
Zameer Khan 54 (61); Dinidu Marage 4/33 (10 Overs)		Alessandro Bonora 56 (94); Bashir Shah 3/33 (10 Overs)

Denmark won by 35 runs
Singapore Cricket Club Ground
Umpires: Akbar Ali (UAE) and Nigel Morrison (Vanuatu)
Player of the match: Hamid Shah (Denmark)

- Denmark won the toss and chose to bat

=== Final ===
28 June
Scorecard

Malaysia; 235/7 (50 overs)	v	Singapore; 178 (46.1 overs)
Khizar Hayat 63 (43); Christopher Janik 2/46 (10 Overs)		Chaminda Ruwan 54 (75); Suharril Fetri 3/31 (10 Overs)

Malaysia won by 57 runs
Kallang
Umpires: Ahmed Shah Durrani (Afghanistan) and Allan Haggo (Scotland)
Player of the match: Khizar Hayat (Malaysia)

- Singapore won the toss and chose to field

== Statistics ==
=== Most runs ===
The top five run scorers (total runs) are included in this table.

Player	Team	Runs	Inns	Avg	S/R	HS	100s	50s
Chaminda Ruwan	Singapore	343	6	85.50	70.43	112*	1	3
Peter Gough	Jersey	240	6	85.00	70.38	61	0	3
Ahmed Faiz	Malaysia	239	6	49.33	59.45	70	0	3
Nasir Shafiq	Malaysia	226	6	45.33	72.43	95*	0	2
Freddie Klokker	Denmark	217	5	66.00	90.04	80	0	2

Source: Cricinfo Most Runs

=== Most wickets ===
The top five wicket takers (total wickets) are listed in this table.

Player	Team	Wkts	Mts	Ave	S/R	Econ	BBI
Shahrulnizam Yusof	Malaysia	16	5	12.12	15.3	4.73	5/49
Ajay Lalcheta	Oman	12	5	14.41	25.8	3.34	5/20
Vince Pennazza	Italy	12	6	16.00	23.0	4.17	4/42
Nat Watkins	Jersey	12	6	19.83	26.5	4.49	4/49
Mulewa Dharmichand	Singapore	10	6	19.30	33.6	3.44	4/21

Source: Cricinfo Most wickets

== Final placings ==
After the conclusion of the tournament the teams were distributed as follows:

Pos.	Team	Status
1st	Malaysia	Promoted to Division Three for 2014
2nd	Singapore	Promoted to Division Three for 2014
3rd	Denmark	Remained in Division Four for 2016
4th	Italy	Remained in Division Four for 2016
5th	Oman	Relegated to Division Five for 2016
6th	Jersey	Relegated to Division Five for 2016
