= 2016 ICC World Cricket League Division Four =

International cricket tournament

- Dates: 29 October – 5 November 2016
- Administrator: International Cricket Council
- Cricket format: 50 overs
- Tournament format(s): Round-robin, play-offs
- Host: United States
- Champions: United States
- Participants: 6
- Matches: 18
- Player of the series: (Oman) Khawar Ali
- Most runs: (Jersey) Corey Bisson (242)
- Most wickets: (Denmark) Aftab Ahmed (United States) Timil Patel (14)

The 2016 ICC World Cricket League Division Four was an international limited-overs cricket tournament held in Los Angeles from 29 October – 5 November 2016. It was the fifth edition of WCL Division Four, and the first World Cricket League tournament played in the United States. All matches were played at the Leo Magnus Cricket Complex.

The tournament was won by the United States, who defeated Oman in the final by 13 runs. Both the finalists were promoted to the 2017 Division Three tournament. The bottom two teams, Jersey and Italy, were relegated to Division Five. Jersey's Corey Bisson was the leading run-scorer, while Denmark's Aftab Ahmed and the United States' Timil Patel were the joint leading wicket-takers. Oman's Khawar Ali, an all-rounder, was named player of the tournament.

After the conclusion of the tournament, the United States captain Steven Taylor said that "this victory means a lot to us, especially as it came with the home crowd behind us". The United States coach Pubudu Dassanayake said "I wouldn't have settled for runner-up in the final" and that he was "very happy how things went in the final".

== Teams ==
The following teams qualified:

- United States (5th in 2014 ICC World Cricket League Division Three)
- Bermuda (6th in 2014 ICC World Cricket League Division Three)
- Denmark (3rd in 2014 ICC World Cricket League Division Four)
- Italy (4th in 2014 ICC World Cricket League Division Four)
- Jersey (1st in 2016 ICC World Cricket League Division Five)
- Oman (2nd in 2016 ICC World Cricket League Division Five)

== Venue ==
All matches were played at Leo Magnus Cricket Complex in Van Nuys, Los Angeles.

Venue	City	Country	Capacity	Matches
Leo Magnus Cricket Complex	Los Angeles	United States	n/a	

== Preparation ==
Bermuda prepared for the tournament by playing four exhibition games in Toronto against club teams and a High Performance XI. Canada traveled to Bermuda to play three 50 over matches. The United States held a five-day camp in Indianapolis between 17 and 21 September. This included two 50 over matches against a Marylebone Cricket Club side. The United States also played Canada in the Auty Cup on 13, 14 and 16 October 2016 in Los Angeles.

== Squads ==
Bermuda Coach: Clay Smith	Denmark Coach: Jeremy Bray	Italy Coach: Kelum Perera
Oliver Pitcher (c); Steven Bremar; Jordan DeSilva; ~~Terryn Fray~~; Brian Hall; Dennico Hollis; Kamau Leverock; Tre Manders; Greg Maybury; Dean Minors; Cejay Outerbridge; Delray Rawlins; Jordan Smith; Dion Stovell; Janeiro Tucker	Michael Pedersen (c); Aftab Ahmed; Saif Ahmad; Taranjit Bharaj; Anders Bülow; Abdul Hashmi; Omar Hayat; Yasir Iqbal; Amjad Khan; Zahmeer Khan; Frederik Klokker; Basit Raja; Bashir Shah; Hamid Shah	Damian Crowley (c); Alessandro Bonora; Zahid Cheema; Luis di Giglio; Tharindu Fernando; Fida Hussain; Gian-Piero Meade; Michele Morettini; Joy Perera; Carl Sandri; Manpreet Singh; Charanjeet Singh; Rizwan Tanweer; Supun Tharanga
Jersey Coach: Neil MacRae	Oman Coach: Duleep Mendis	United States Coach: Pubudu Dassanayake
Peter Gough (c); Corey Bisson; Harrison Carlyon; Tony Carlyon*; Jake Dunford; Luke Gallichan; William Harris; Anthony Hawkins-Kay; Jonty Jenner; Ben Kynman; Robert McBey; Elliot Miles; Rhys Palmer; Charles Perchard; Nat Watkins	Ajay Lalcheta (c); Aamer Ali; Khawar Ali; Munis Ansari; Swapnil Khadye; Mehran Khan; Zeeshan Maqsood; Sufyan Mehmood; Mohammad Nadeem; Arun Poulose; Rajesh Ranpura; Zeeshan Siddiqui; Jatinder Singh; Vaibhav Wategaonkar	Steven Taylor (c); Danial Ahmed; Timroy Allen; Alex Amsterdam; Fahad Babar; Akeem Dodson (wk); Elmore Hutchinson; Ali Khan; Prashanth Nair; Timil Patel; ~~Srini Santhanam~~; Jasdeep Singh; Nicholas Standford; Abdullah Syed; Ravi Timbawala

- Srini Santhanam was originally named in the U.S. squad, but was replaced by Ravi Timbawala after suffering a pre-tournament injury.
- Terryn Fray was originally named in Bermuda's squad, but was replaced by Janeiro Tucker after breaking a finger in a warm-up match.
- Denmark's captain Michael Pedersen left the tournament on 1 November to attend to a family emergency, with Amjad Khan standing in as captain in his absence.
- Due to several members of the squad suffering injuries during the tournament, Tony Carlyon, Jersey's 46-year-old team manager, was called into the team for the final match of the tournament.

== Round-robin ==
=== Points table ===
Pos	Team	Pld	W	L	T	NR	Pts	NRR	Promotion or relegation
1	Oman	5	4	1	0	0	8	0.177	Promoted to 2017 Division Three
2	United States	5	3	2	0	0	6	0.897	Promoted to 2017 Division Three
3	Denmark	5	3	2	0	0	6	0.308	Remain in 2018 Division Four
4	Bermuda	5	2	3	0	0	4	−0.067	Remain in 2018 Division Four
5	Jersey	5	2	3	0	0	4	−0.598	Relegated to 2017 Division Five
6	Italy	5	1	4	0	0	2	−0.651	Relegated to 2017 Division Five

Source: Cricinfo

=== Fixtures ===
All times are given in Pacific Daylight Time (PDT).

29 October
10:00
Scorecard

Bermuda; 201 (48.3 overs)	v	United States; 202/2 (32.4 overs)

United States won by 8 wickets
Severn Field, Leo Magnus Cricket Complex
Player of the match: Timil Patel (US)

29 October
10:00
Scorecard

Denmark; 214/8 (50 overs)	v	Italy; 100 (21.1 overs)

Denmark won by 114 runs
Wright Field, Leo Magnus Cricket Complex
Player of the match: Carl Sandri (Italy)

29 October
10:00
Scorecard

Jersey; 203/5 (50 overs)	v	Oman; 204/4 (46.4 overs)

Oman won by 6 wickets
Wong Field, Leo Magnus Cricket Complex
Player of the match: Swapnil Khadye (Oman)

30 October
10:00
Scorecard

Bermuda; 173/9 (40 overs)	v	Oman; 174/6 (34 overs)

Oman won by 4 wickets
Severn Field, Leo Magnus Cricket Complex
Player of the match: Jatinder Singh (Oman)

30 October
10:00
Scorecard

Jersey; 158 (36.4 overs)	v	Denmark; 159/4 (32.1 overs)

Denmark won by 6 wickets
Wright Field, Leo Magnus Cricket Complex
Player of the match: Saif Ahmad (Den)

30 October
10:00
Scorecard

Italy; 185/5 (41 overs)	v	United States; 186/9 (37.2 overs)

United States won by 1 wicket
Wong Field, Leo Magnus Cricket Complex
Player of the match: Timroy Allen (US)

1 November
10:00
Scorecard

Bermuda; 221/7 (50 overs)	v	Denmark; 183 (48.1 overs)

Bermuda won by 38 runs
Wong Field, Leo Magnus Cricket Complex
Player of the match: Jordan DeSilva (Ber)

1 November
10:00
Scorecard

Italy; 235 (49.5 overs)	v	Jersey; 236/7 (49.3 overs)

Jersey won by 3 wickets
Severn Field, Leo Magnus Cricket Complex
Player of the match: Nathaniel Watkins (Jer)

1 November
10:00
Scorecard

Oman; 163 (49.2 overs)	v	United States; 165/2 (29.3 overs)

United States won by 8 wickets
Wright Field, Leo Magnus Cricket Complex
Player of the match: Steven Taylor (US)

2 November
10:00
Scorecard

Bermuda; 312/8 (45 overs)	v	Jersey; 227 (37.2 overs)

Bermuda by 85 runs (DLS method)
Wright Field, Leo Magnus Cricket Complex
Player of the match: Kamau Leverock (Ber)

- The match was reduced to 45 per side after time was lost due to wind that brought the sightscreens down during Bermuda's innings.

2 November
10:00
Scorecard

United States; 261/9 (50 overs)	v	Denmark; 262/6 (48.3 overs)

Denmark by 4 wickets
Severn Field, Leo Magnus Cricket Complex
Player of the match: Zameer Khan (Den)

2 November
10:00
Scorecard

Italy; 205/9 (50 overs)	v	Oman; 208/5 (40.3 overs)

Oman by 5 wickets
Wong Field, Leo Magnus Cricket Complex
Player of the match: Zeeshan Siddiqui (Oman)

4 November
10:00
Scorecard

Italy; 228/8 (50.0 overs)	v	Bermuda; 203/9 (50.0 overs)

Italy won by 25 runs
Wright Field, Leo Magnus Cricket Complex
Player of the match: Charanjeet Singh (Italy)

4 November
10:00
Scorecard

Oman; 189 (46.4 overs)	v	Denmark; 146 (34.0 overs)

Oman won by 43 runs
Severn Field, Leo Magnus Cricket Complex
Player of the match: Khawar Ali (Oman)

4 November
10:00
Scorecard

Jersey; 249 (48.2 overs)	v	United States; 248/8 (50.0 overs)

Jersey won by 1 run
Wong Field, Leo Magnus Cricket Complex
Player of the match: Nathaniel Watkins (Jer)

== Playoffs ==
=== Fifth-place playoff ===
5 November
10:00
Scorecard

Jersey; 250/6 (50.0 overs)	v	Italy; 208 (46.4 overs)

Jersey won by 42 runs
Wong Field, Leo Magnus Cricket Complex
Player of the match: Corey Bisson (Jer)

=== Third-place playoff ===
5 November
10:00
Scorecard

Denmark; 269/8 (50 overs)	v	Bermuda; 225/8 (50 overs)

Denmark won by 44 runs
Wright Field, Leo Magnus Cricket Complex
Player of the match: Taranjit Bharaj (Den)

=== First-place playoff ===
5 November
10:00
Scorecard

United States; 208 (49.4 overs)	v	Oman; 195/9 (50 overs)

United States won by 13 runs
Severn Field, Leo Magnus Cricket Complex
Player of the match: Jasdeep Singh (US)

== Statistics ==
=== Most runs ===
The top five run-scorers are included in this table, ranked by runs scored and then by batting average.

Player	Team	Runs	Inns	Avg	Highest	100s	50s
Corey Bisson	Jersey	242	6	80.66	54*	0	2
Kamau Leverock	Bermuda	236	6	39.33	137	1	0
Nathaniel Watkins	Jersey	223	5	44.60	77	0	2
Alex Amsterdam	United States	213	5	53.25	102	1	1
Steven Taylor	United States	209	6	41.80	124*	1	1

Source: ESPNcricinfo

=== Most wickets ===
The top five wicket-takers are listed in this table, ranked by wickets taken and then by bowling average.

Player	Team	Overs	Wkts	Ave	Econ	SR	BBI
Aftab Ahmed	Denmark	46.4	14	14.42	4.32	20.0	4/30
Timil Patel	United States	52.3	14	15.50	4.13	22.5	5/22
Bashir Shah	Denmark	36.1	13	12.61	4.53	16.6	4/18
Charles Perchard	Jersey	51.2	13	15.53	3.93	23.6	4/22
Khawar Ali	Oman	43.0	13	16.38	4.95	19.8	5/37

Source: ESPNcricinfo
