= World Cricket League Division Four =

WCL Division Four
- Administrator: ICC
- Format: 50 overs
- First edition: 2008
- Latest edition: 2018
- Tournament format: Round robin, playoffs
- Number of teams: 6
- Current champion: Uganda
- Most successful: United States (2 titles)

ICC World Cricket League Division Four forms part of the World Cricket League (WCL) system. Like all other divisions, WCL Division Four is contested as a standalone tournament rather than as an actual league.

The inaugural Division Four tournament was held in 2008, hosted by Tanzania. Subsequent tournaments have been held in 2010 (in Italy), 2012 (in Malaysia), 2014 (in Singapore), and 2016 (in the United States). Both the number of teams (six) and tournament format (round-robin followed by playoffs) have remained unchanged between editions. Because the WCL operates on a system of promotion and relegation, teams generally only participate in one or two Division Four tournaments before being either promoted to Division Three or relegated to Division Five. In total, sixteen teams have played in at least one Division Four tournament. Afghanistan and Hong Kong, the inaugural Division Four finalists, have gone on to much greater success, both currently holding One Day International (ODI) status.

== Results ==
Year	Host(s)	Venue(s)	Final		
Year	Host(s)	Venue(s)	Winner	Result	Runner-up
2008	Tanzania	Dar es Salaam	Afghanistan; 179 (49.4 overs)	Afghanistan won by 57 runs scorecard	Hong Kong; 122 (45 overs)
2010	Italy	Bologna	United States; 188/2 (21.4 overs)	United States won by 8 wickets scorecard	Italy; 185/9 (50 overs)
2012	Malaysia	Kuala Lumpur	Nepal; 147/2 (28 overs)	Nepal won by 8 wickets scorecard	United States; 145 (48.1 overs)
2014	Singapore	Singapore	Malaysia; 235/7 (50 overs)	Malaysia won by 57 runs scorecard	Singapore; 178 (46.1 overs)
2016	United States	Los Angeles	United States; 208 (49.4 overs)	United States won by 13 runs scorecard	Oman; 195/9 (50 overs)
2018	Malaysia	Kuala Lumpur; Bandar Kinrara	Uganda; 8 points	Uganda won on points table	Denmark; 6 points

== Performance by team ==
Legend

- 1st – Champions
- 2nd – Runners-up
- 3rd – Third place
- Q – Qualified
- — Hosts

Team	(Tanzania) 2008	(Italy) 2010	(Malaysia) 2012	(Singapore) 2014	(United States) 2016	(Malaysia) 2018	next	Total
Afghanistan	1st	—	—	—	—	—	—	1
Argentina	—	6th	—	—	—	—	—	1
Bermuda	—	—	—	—	4th	6th	—	2
Cayman Islands	—	5th	—	—	—	—	—	1
Denmark	—	—	4th	3rd	3rd	2nd	—	4
Fiji	5th	—	—	—	—	—	—	1
Hong Kong	2nd	—	—	—	—	—	—	1
Italy	3rd	2nd	—	4th	6th	—	—	4
Jersey	6th	—	—	6th	5th	4th	Q	5
Malaysia	—	—	5th	1st	—	3rd	Q	4
Nepal	—	3rd	1st	—	—	—	—	2
Oman	—	—	—	5th	2nd	—	—	2
Singapore	—	—	3rd	2nd	—	—	—	2
Tanzania	4th	4th	6th	—	—	—	—	3
Uganda	—	—	—	—	—	1st	—	1
United States	—	1st	2nd	—	1st	—	—	3
Vanuatu	—	—	—	—	—	5th	—	1

- Note: at every edition of the tournament, the teams finishing first and second have been promoted to Division Three, and the teams finishing fifth and sixth have been relegated to Division Five.

== Player statistics ==
Year	Most runs	Most wickets	Ref
2008	(Hong Kong) Hussain Butt (267)	(Afghanistan) Hamid Hassan (16)	
2010	(Italy) Peter Petricola (235)	(Nepal) Basanta Regmi (14)	
2012	(United States) Sushil Nadkarni (238)	(Nepal) Basanta Regmi (21)	
2014	(Singapore) Chaminda Ruwan (343)	(Malaysia) Shahrulnizam Yusof (16)	
2016	(Jersey) Corey Bisson (242)	(Denmark) Aftab Ahmed (14) (United States) Timil Patel (14)	
2018	(Malaysia) Ahmed Faiz (298)	(Uganda) Mohammed Irfan (15)	
