= Dinidu Marage =

Italian cricketer

Personal information
- Full name: Dinidu Asanka Marage
- Born: 24 September 1981 (age 45); Colombo, Sri Lanka
- Batting: Right-handed
- Bowling: Leg spin
- Role: All-rounder

International information
- National side: Italy (2013–present)

Domestic team information
- Years: Team
- 2001–2003: Chilaw Marians
- 2004: Panadura Sports Club

Career statistics
Competition	FC	LA	T20
Matches	22	14	6
Runs scored	397	196	14
Batting average	13.68	16.33	4.66
100s/50s	0/0	0/0	0/0
Top score	47	37	9
Balls bowled	498	221	54
Wickets	5	3	0
Bowling average	47.60	66.33	–
5 wickets in innings	0	0	–
10 wickets in match	0	0	–
Best bowling	2/48	1/25	–
Catches/stumpings	10/–	4/–	0/–
- Source: CricketArchive, 21 September 2021

Dinidu Asanka Marage (born 24 September 1981) is an Italian cricketer of Sri Lankan origin. A right-handed leg spinning all-rounder, he played in high-level Sri Lankan domestic competitions for Chilaw Marians Cricket Club and Panadura Sports Club early in his career. After emigrating to Italy, he made his debut for the Italian national side in April 2013, at the 2013 World Cricket League Division Three tournament.

== Career in Sri Lanka ==
Born in Colombo, Marage's first recorded matches at a high level came during the 2001–02 season, when he played several games for Bloomfield Cricket and Athletic Club in an under-23 tournament. He made his first-class debut in November 2001, aged 20, playing for Chilaw Marians in the Premier Trophy. Marage finished his 2001–02 season with 107 runs and five wickets from seven Premier Trophy matches, as well as 61 runs and two wickets from six appearances in the Premier Limited Overs Tournament. His highest score, 42, came in the last fixture of the season, a Premier Trophy game against Moratuwa Sports Club.

Marage again appeared regularly for Chilaw Marians during the 2002–03 season, with nine out of a possible eleven Premier Trophy games. Against Ragama Cricket Club, he made what was to be his highest first-class score, 47 from eighth in the batting order. After his last match for Chilaw Marians in February 2003, Marage did not appear again at a high level until June 2004, when he played in an under-23 tournament for Saracens Sports Club. His 2004–05 senior season, his last in Sri Lanka, was spent with Panadura Sports Club, and consisted of six games in both the Premier Trophy and its limited-overs equivalent, as well as a single game in the knockout Twenty20 Tournament (the inaugural season of that format in Sri Lanka). He made his Twenty20 debut on 17 August 2004, for Panadura Sports Club in the 2004 SLC Twenty20 Tournament.

== Career in Italy ==
Marage made his debut for the Italian national team at the 2013 WCL Division Three tournament in Bermuda. On debut against Oman, he opened the batting with Damian Fernando, a former Chilaw Marians teammate. Marage made 19 runs from 25 balls (including two sixes) in that match, and took 1/18 from five overs while bowling. His other matches at the tournament were less successful – he made a three-ball duck against the United States and a golden duck against Bermuda, and failed to take a wicket in either match. The next major tournament for Marage and Italy was the 2013 European T20 Championship in England. He played in all seven matches, and his 276 runs was the most for Italy (and behind only Denmark's Frederik Klokker and Guernsey's Jeremy Frith overall). He topscored in three matches, with innings of 65* against Gibraltar, 107 against Norway, and 42 against Jersey. His innings against Norway, made in only 62 balls, was the first century in the tournament's history.

By winning the European T20 Championship, Italy qualified for the 2013 World Twenty20 Qualifier, where matches had full Twenty20 status. Marage played in only five of Italy's games at the tournament – four out of seven group games (one being abandoned) and the quarter-final against Scotland. He had little success, making only five runs from three batting innings and conceding 44 runs (without taking a wicket) from five overs bowling. In an earlier warm-up game against the Netherlands he had been bowled by Tim Gruijters from the first ball of the match. Marage finished third in both runs scored and wickets taken for Italy at the 2014 WCL Division Four tournament in Singapore. His two best performances there both came against Denmark – a man of the match 82 in a group-stage match (including a 150-run opening partnership with Andrew Northcote), and then 4/33 in the third-place playoff. Marage has since been named in Italy's squad for its next major tournament, the 2015 European T20 Championship in Jersey.

In September 2021, he was named in Italy's Twenty20 International (T20I) squad for the Regional Final of the 2021 ICC Men's T20 World Cup Europe Qualifier tournament.
