= Tony Carlyon =

Jersey cricketer and coach

Personal information
- Full name: Tony Carlyon
- Born: 16 April 1970 (age 56)
- Source: ESPNcricinfo

Tony Carlyon (16 April 1970) is a former professional cricketer who played for Jersey and is the current team coach.

In the final match for Jersey in the 2016 ICC World Cricket League Division Four tournament, the fifth-place playoff against Italy, he played alongside his son, Harrison Carlyon. Injuries in the Jersey team forced him to play, becoming the first father and son to play together in an international match for Jersey. He last played for Jersey in 2011.
