= Nathaniel Watkins =

English cricketer

Personal information
- Full name: Nathaniel Ashley Thomas Watkins
- Born: 7 November 1991 (age 35); Oxford, Oxfordshire, England
- Batting: Right-handed
- Bowling: Slow left-arm orthodox

International information
- National side: Jersey (2012–)

Domestic team information
- Years: Team
- 2011: Oxfordshire
- 2011–2013: Durham MCCU

Career statistics
Competition	First-class
Matches	5
Runs scored	82
Batting average	11.71
100s/50s	0/0
Top score	38*
Balls bowled	846
Wickets	13
Bowling average	46.00
5 wickets in innings	1
10 wickets in match	0
Best bowling	5/88
Catches/stumpings	3/–
- Source: Cricinfo, 28 April 2015

Nathaniel Ashley Thomas Watkins (born 7 November 1991) is an English-born Jersey international cricketer. He also played three seasons with Durham MCCU, including a number of first-class games, and also appeared in several minor counties matches for Oxfordshire. Watkins is a right-handed batsman who bowls slow left-arm orthodox spin.

== Early life and education ==
Born in Oxford, Oxfordshire, and educated at Abingdon School, Watkins then studied for his degree in Natural Sciences at Durham University.

== Cricket career ==
Watkins made his first-class debut for Durham MCCU against Yorkshire during the 2011 season. On debut, he took his maiden first-class five wicket haul, with figures of 5/88 in Yorkshire's first-innings. Later in the season, Watkins played three Minor Counties Championship matches for Oxfordshire, against Dorset, Berkshire, and Cheshire. He played two further first-class matches during the 2012 season (against Middlesex and Durham), and then again in 2013 (against Durham and Nottinghamshire.

Qualifying via his father, a headmaster of Saint Helier's Victoria College, Watkins made his debut for Jersey late in the 2012 season, in the annual inter-insular match against Guernsey. He played in the same fixture in 2013, but did not make his debut for the side at an international tournament until March 2014, when he featured in the 2014 WCL Division Five tournament in Malaysia. Watkins was one of Jersey's leading players at the tournament, finishing only behind Ben Stevens for runs scored and being named man of the match twice – for 73 and 1/16 against Tanzania and for 116 and 1/25 in the final against Malaysia. Jersey won the tournament to qualify for the following 2014 WCL Division Four event in Singapore, but they were less successful there, finishing fifth to be relegated back to Division Five. Watkins was his side's leading wicket taker, with 12 wickets from his six matches, and also finished second to Peter Gough for runs scored. His best performances were 4/49 against Denmark and 73 against Singapore.

Selected for the 2015 ICC Europe Division One, the 2016 ICC World Cricket League Division Five held in Jersey where Watkins came fifth in both Most Runs and Most Wickets and again for the 2016 ICC World Cricket League Division Four matches held in Los Angeles.

In April 2018, he was named in Jersey's squad for the 2018 ICC World Cricket League Division Four tournament in Malaysia. In November 2019, he was named in Jersey's squad for the Cricket World Cup Challenge League B tournament in Oman. He made his List A debut, for Jersey against Uganda, on 2 December 2019.

== See also ==
- List of Old Abingdonians
