= Shahrulnizam =

Shahrulnizam is a masculine given name. Notable people with the name include:

- Shahrulnizam Mustapa (born 1981), Malaysian footballer
- Shahrulnizam Yusof (born 1990), Malaysian cricketer
