= Michael Raso =

Italian cricketer

Personal information
- Full name: Michael Gino Raso
- Born: 7 September 1980 (age 46)
- Batting: Left-handed
- Bowling: Right-arm leg spin
- Role: Batsman

International information
- National side: Italy (2013–2015)

Career statistics
| Competition | T20 |
|---|---|
| Matches | 6 |
| Runs scored | 79 |
| Batting average | 26.33 |
| 100s/50s | 0/0 |
| Top score | 35* |
| Catches/stumpings | 1/– |
- Source: CricketArchive, 3 May 2015

Michael Gino Raso (born 7 July 1980) is an Italian cricketer of Australian origin. He made his debut for the Italian national side at the 2010 European Championship.

Born to Italian parents, Raso played club cricket in Far North Queensland from an early age, and before debuting for Italy also spent several seasons for English and Scottish club sides during the Australian off-season. At his debut tournament for Italy, the 2010 European Championship in Jersey, Raso topscored for Italy with 138 runs, with a best of 56 against a Netherlands A team. At the 2010 World Cricket League Division Four, which was played in Italy, Raso batted mainly in the lower order. He retained his place for the following year's Division Three tournament in Hong Kong, but his four matches there yielded only 50 runs.

Raso made his 20-over debut at the 2011 European T20 Championship, but after that tournament did not play again for the Italian team until May 2013, at the 2013 WCL Division Three tournament in Bermuda. At the 2013 European T20 Championship, he played every match, with Italy winning the championship to qualify for the 2013 World Twenty20 Qualifier. Raso played six of a possible nine games for Italy, including both the quarter-final against Scotland and the ninth-place playoff against Namibia. His best performance at the tournament had come in an earlier group-stage match against Namibia, when he topscored with 35 not out from seventh in the batting order. At the 2014 WCL Division Four, Raso's sole half-century came against Denmark in the third-place playoff. His 52 runs came from only 49 balls, and included a 97-run partnership with Alessandro Bonora, though this was not enough to prevent Italy losing by 35 runs. Raso was also included in Italy's squad for its most recent major tournament, the 2015 European T20 Championship in Jersey.
