= Corne Bodenstein =

Jersey cricketer

Personal information
- Full name: Cornelis Johannes Bodenstein
- Born: 3 November 1992 (age 34); Pretoria, Transvaal Province, South Africa
- Batting: Left-handed
- Bowling: Left-arm medium-fast
- Role: All-rounder

International information
- National side: Jersey (2011–)

Domestic team information
- Years: Team
- 2013: Oxford MCC University
- Source: CricketArchive, 12 May 2015

Cornelis Johannes "Corne" Bodenstein (born 3 November 1992) is a Jersey international cricketer. Born in South Africa, he also played two first-class matches for Oxford MCC University during the 2013 season. Bodenstein is a left-handed all-rounder.

Bodenstein was born in Pretoria, but went to school in Jersey, attending Saint Helier's Victoria College. A captain of the school team, he represented Jersey at both the 2009 and 2010 European Under-17 Championships. His senior debut for Jersey came in 2011, at the age of 18, when he played against Cornwall and a Hertfordshire development team early in the season. Bodenstein also represented the Jersey under-19s in 20-over tournaments in both 2011 and 2012, playing against other European sides. While a student at Oxford Brookes University in 2013, he was selected in Oxford MCC University's squad, playing a number of fixtures against university sides and various other teams. Bodenstein's season including two first-class matches, against Warwickshire in April and against Worcestershire in May. On debut, he took five wickets for the match (3/53 and 2/12), but scored only 1 and 4 in his two innings. His batting fared slightly better against Worcestershire, with a first-innings duck followed by 27 in the second innings, but he failed to take a wicket while bowling.

Bodenstein was a member of the Jersey squad at the 2013 European T20 Championship, held in England in July. He played four out of five games at the tournament, including Jersey's semi-final loss to Italy, and finished with eight wickets, second only to Ben Stevens for Jersey. The 2013 World Cricket League Division Six tournament was hosted by Jersey later in the month, and Bodenstein again had a successful tournament – only three players (two Nigerians and Ben Stevens, again) took more wickets than his eleven. Jersey won Division Six to gain promotion to the following year's Division Five tournament, played in Malaysia. Bodenstein's most notable performance there was 4/37 against Tanzania. He has since also played for Jersey at the 2014 WCL Division Four tournament in Singapore, and the 2015 European T20 Championship, which was hosted by Jersey.

In April 2018, he was named in Jersey's squad for the 2018 ICC World Cricket League Division Four tournament in Malaysia.
