= Yasir Iqbal =

Danish cricketer (born 1983)

Personal information
- Born: 19 September 1983 (age 43); Aarhus, Denmark
- Batting: Right-handed
- Bowling: Right-arm medium
- Role: All-rounder

International information
- National side: Denmark (2006–2015)

Career statistics
Competition	T20
Matches	7
Runs scored	87
Batting average	12.42
100s/50s	0/0
Top score	35
Balls bowled	90
Wickets	5
Bowling average	28.40
5 wickets in innings	0
10 wickets in match	0
Best bowling	1/13
Catches/stumpings	0/–
- Source: CricketArchive, 8 May 2015

Yasir Iqbal (born 19 September 1983) is a Danish cricketer who made his debut for the Danish national side in July 2006. He is a right-handed all-rounder who bowls medium pace.

== Career ==
Iqbal debuted for the Danish national under-19 team at the 2000 European Under-19 Championship, aged only 16. He debuted for Denmark A in 2002, but did not make his senior international debut until the 2006 season, when he played two games in the 2006 European Championship. Although he occasionally played against other European teams and touring international sides, Iqbal did not appear for Denmark in a major tournament until January 2011, when he featured in the 2013 World Cricket League Division Three tournament in Hong Kong. From four matches, he scored 51 runs, with a best of 31 against the United States in a group-stage game, opening with Frederik Klokker. His single wicket of the tournament also came against the U.S., in the fifth-place playoff.

Playing his club cricket for Kjøbenhavns Boldklub (KB), Iqbal was second for runs scored and third for wickets taken for KB in 2012, and in 2013 was third for runs scored and second for wickets. Iqbal was included in Denmark's squad for the 2013 World Twenty20 Qualifier in the United Arab Emirates, where matches at the tournament had full Twenty20 status. He featured in all seven of Denmark's matches, with his highest score coming against Afghanistan, 35 from 42 balls. He also bowled at least two overs in every game, finishing with five wickets (though never more than one in a match). At Denmark's next major tournament after the World Twenty20 Qualifier, the 2014 WCL Division Four tournament in Singapore, Iqbal was man of the match in the opening game against Singapore. He scored 54 from 47 balls coming in eighth in the batting order, and then proceeded to take 4/29 from his eight overs. Iqbal's eight wickets for the tournament made him Denmark's leading wicket taker, equal with Bashir Shah and Amjad Khan.
