= Luke Gallichan =

Jersey cricketer (born 1995)

Personal information
- Born: 2 April 1995 (age 31)
- Batting: Left-handed
- Bowling: Slow left-arm orthodox

International information
- National side: Jersey
- Source: Cricinfo, 30 October 2016

Luke Gallichan (born 2 April 1995) is a cricketer who plays for Jersey. He played in the 2013 ICC World Cricket League Division Six tournament and the 2016 ICC World Cricket League Division Four matches held in Los Angeles.
