= 2018 ICC World Cricket League Division Four =

Cricket tournament

- Dates: 29 April – 6 May 2018
- Administrator: International Cricket Council
- Cricket format: Limited-overs (50 overs)
- Tournament format(s): Round-robin and Knockout
- Host: Malaysia
- Champions: Uganda
- Participants: 6
- Matches: 17
- Player of the series: (Jersey) Ben Stevens
- Most runs: (Malaysia) Ahmad Faiz (298)
- Most wickets: (Uganda) Irfan Afridi (15)

The 2018 ICC World Cricket League Division Four was an international cricket tournament that took place during April and May 2018 in Malaysia. It formed part of the 2017–19 cycle of the World Cricket League (WCL) which determined the qualification for the 2023 Cricket World Cup. The top two teams were promoted to the 2018 ICC World Cricket League Division Three tournament and the bottom two teams were relegated to Division Five.

Two of the three final round of group stage matches finished as a no result because of rain. Per the rules of the tournament, the matches were replayed on the final day of the competition, with the play-off round scrapped and used as a reserve day. Therefore, the final league standings were used to determine the promotion and relegation places.

Uganda won the tournament and were promoted to Division Three, along with the runners-up Denmark. Vanuatu and Bermuda finished in fifth and sixth respectively, and were relegated to Division Five. Hosts Malaysia finished third and Jersey finished fourth, therefore both team remained in Division Four. Ben Stevens of Jersey was named as the player of the tournament.

== Teams ==
Six teams qualified for the tournament:

- Uganda (5th in 2017 ICC World Cricket League Division Three)
- Malaysia (6th in 2017 ICC World Cricket League Division Three)
- Denmark (3rd in 2016 ICC World Cricket League Division Four)
- Bermuda (4th in 2016 ICC World Cricket League Division Four)
- Jersey (1st in 2017 ICC World Cricket League Division Five)
- Vanuatu (2nd in 2017 ICC World Cricket League Division Five)

== Preparation ==
The Uganda cricket team played a 20-over match and four 50-over matches against the Saudi Arabia cricket team in Kyambogo and Lugogo to prepare ahead of the tournament. Uganda also played two friendly matches against a visiting academy team from India. Malaysia played matches against Singapore in March 2018, for the Stan Nagaiah Trophy. Jersey played two one-day games against Kent County Cricket Club, before playing two further warm-up games in Singapore. Bermuda played three practice matches in Dubai before travelling to Malaysia for the tournament.

== Squads ==
Bermuda Coach: Clay Smith	Denmark Coach: Jeremy Bray	Jersey Coach: Neil MacRae
Terryn Fray (c); Dion Stovell (vc); Okera Bascome; Steven Bremar; Kwasi James; Kamau Leverock; Tre Manders; Cejay Outerbridge; Steven Outerbridge; Jacobi Robinson; Macai Simmons; Chare Smith; Charles Trott; Janeiro Tucker	Hamid Shah (c); Saif Ahmad; Taranjit Bharaj; Anders Bülow; Jonas Henriksen; Mads Henriksen; Zahmeer Khan; Frederik Klokker; Nicolaj Laegsgaard; Rizwan Mahmood; Basit Raja; Bashir Shah; Anique Uddin; Shangeev Thanikaithasan	Charles Perchard (c); Corey Bisson; Dominic Blampied; Corne Bodenstein; Harrison Carlyon; Jake Dunford; Nicholas Ferraby; Peter Gough; Anthony Hawkins-Kay; Jonty Jenner; Elliot Miles; Will Robertson; Ben Stevens; Nathaniel Watkins
Malaysia Coach: Bilal Asad	Uganda Coach: Peter Kirsten	Vanuatu Coach: Shane Deitz
Anwar Arudin (c); Suhan Alagaratnam; Syed Aziz; Ahmad Faiz; Suharril Fetri; Dhivendran Mogan; Anwar Rahman; Shafiq Sharif; Mohammad Shukri; Pavandeep Singh; Virandeep Singh; Muhamad Syahadat; Muhammad Wafiq; Che Wan Zalati	Roger Mukasa (c); Fred Achelam; Bilal Hassan; Irfan Afridi; Hamu Kayondo; Brian Masaba; Deusdedit Muhumuza; Frank Nsubuga; Riazat Ali Shah; Henry Ssenyondo; Simon Ssesazi; Steven Wabwose; Charles Waiswa; Kenneth Waiswa	Andrew Mansale (c); Jonathon Dunn (vc); Callum Blake; Jelany Chilia; Shane Deitz; Trevor Langa; Patrick Matautaava; Williamsing Nalisa; Nalin Nipiko; Simpson Obed; Joshua Rasu; Apolinaire Stephen; Ronald Tari; Wesley Viraliliu

== Points table ==
Pos	Team	Pld	W	L	T	NR	Pts	NRR	Promotion or relegation
1	Uganda	5	4	1	0	0	8	1.175	Promoted to Division Three for 2018
2	Denmark	5	3	2	0	0	6	0.349	Promoted to Division Three for 2018
3	Malaysia	5	3	2	0	0	6	0.322	Relegated to ICC Cricket World Cup Challenge League
4	Jersey	5	2	3	0	0	4	0.044	Relegated to ICC Cricket World Cup Challenge League
5	Vanuatu	5	2	3	0	0	4	−0.677	Relegated to ICC Cricket World Cup Challenge League
6	Bermuda	5	1	4	0	0	2	−1.065	Relegated to ICC Cricket World Cup Challenge League

== Fixtures ==
The fixtures were confirmed by the International Cricket Council (ICC) in April 2018.

=== Round robin ===
29 April 2018
09:30
Scorecard

Malaysia; 208 (49.3 overs)	v	Uganda; 199 (49.1 overs)

Malaysia won by 9 runs
Kinrara Academy Oval, Bandar Kinrara

- Malaysia won the toss and elected to bat.

29 April 2018
09:30
Scorecard

Bermuda; 209 (47.5 overs)	v	Denmark; 212/2 (41.5 overs)

Denmark won by 8 wickets
Royal Selangor Club, Kuala Lumpur

- Denmark won the toss and elected to field.

29 April 2018
09:30
Scorecard

Vanuatu; 104 (36 overs)	v	Jersey; 105/3 (31.1 overs)

Jersey won by 7 wickets
UKM Cricket Oval, Bangi

- Jersey won the toss and elected to field.

30 April 2018
09:30
Scorecard

Malaysia; 196 (43.5 overs)	v	Vanuatu; 173 (49.3 overs)

Malaysia won by 23 runs
Kinrara Academy Oval, Bandar Kinrara

- Vanuatu won the toss and elected to field.

30 April 2018
09:30
Scorecard

Jersey; 238/6 (50 overs)	v	Denmark; 114/3 (21.5 overs)

Denmark won by 7 wickets (DLS method)
Royal Selangor Club, Kuala Lumpur

- Denmark won the toss and elected to field.
- Denmark were set a revised target of 114 from 23 overs due to rain.

30 April 2018
09:30
Scorecard

Uganda; 249/5 (50 overs)	v	Bermuda; 60 (21.4 overs)

Uganda won by 189 runs
UKM Cricket Oval, Bangi

- Bermuda won the toss and elected to field.

2 May 2018
09:30
Scorecard

Bermuda; 242 (49.2 overs)	v	Jersey; 184 (42.5 overs)

Bermuda won by 58 runs
Kinrara Academy Oval, Bandar Kinrara

- Jersey won the toss and elected to field.

2 May 2018
09:30
Scorecard

Uganda; 222/8 (50 overs)	v	Vanuatu; 141 (47 overs)

Uganda won by 81 runs
Royal Selangor Club, Kuala Lumpur

- Vanuatu won the toss and elected to field.

2 May 2018
09:30
Scorecard

Denmark; 179 (49 overs)	v	Malaysia; 146 (45.3 overs)

Denmark won by 33 runs
UKM Cricket Oval, Bangi

- Denmark won the toss and elected to bat.

3 May 2018
09:30
Scorecard

Uganda; 215/8 (50 overs)	v	Denmark; 129 (29 overs)

Uganda won by 1 run (DLS method)
Kinrara Academy Oval, Bandar Kinrara

- Denmark won the toss and elected to field.
- Denmark were set a revised target of 131 from 29 overs due to rain.

3 May 2018
09:30
Scorecard

Jersey; 270/8 (50 overs)	v	Malaysia; 221/7 (42 overs)

Jersey won by 10 runs (DLS method)
Royal Selangor Club, Kuala Lumpur

- Jersey won the toss and elected to bat.
- Malaysia were set a revised target of 232 from 42 overs due to rain.

3 May 2018
09:30
Scorecard

Bermuda; 181/9 (50 overs)	v	Vanuatu; 183/6 (49 overs)

Vanuatu won by 4 wickets
UKM Cricket Oval, Bangi

- Bermuda won the toss and elected to bat.

5 May 2018
09:30
Scorecard

Denmark; 234/9 (50 overs)	v	Vanuatu; 238/5 (49.1 overs)

Vanuatu won by 5 wickets
Kinrara Academy Oval, Bandar Kinrara

- Denmark won the toss and elected to bat.

5 May 2018
09:30
Scorecard

Malaysia; 228/8 (50 overs)	v	Bermuda; 55/2 (17 overs)

No result
Royal Selangor Club, Kuala Lumpur

- Malaysia won the toss and elected to bat.

5 May 2018
09:30
Scorecard

Jersey; 126 (42.2 overs)	v	Uganda; 55/3 (19.4 overs)

No result
UKM Cricket Oval, Bangi

- Uganda won the toss and elected to field.

== Replays ==
As the following two matches finished in a no result on the previous day, the scheduled play-off round was scrapped, with the fixtures restarted from scratch.

6 May 2018
09:30
Scorecard

Malaysia; 257/8 (50 overs)	v	Bermuda; 168/9 (50 overs)

Malaysia won by 89 runs
Kinrara Academy Oval, Bandar Kinrara

- Malaysia won the toss and elected to bat.

6 May 2018
09:30
Scorecard

Uganda; 90 (37 overs)	v	Jersey; 83 (35 overs)

Uganda won by 7 runs
UKM Cricket Oval, Bangi

- Jersey won the toss and elected to field.

== Final standings ==
Pos.	Team	Status
1st	Uganda	Promoted to Division Three for 2018
2nd	Denmark	Promoted to Division Three for 2018
3rd	Malaysia	Remained in Division Four (Note: These were the original placements following the conclusion of the group. However, in October 2018, the ICC replaced WCL Divisions Three, Four and Five with the Cricket World Cup Challenge League, with these teams being assigned to that competition.)
4th	Jersey	Remained in Division Four
5th	Vanuatu	Relegated to Division Five
6th	Bermuda	Relegated to Division Five
