= Singapore Cricket Club Ground =

Cricket ground in Singapore

- The Padang

Ground information
- End names
- Supreme Court and Parliament House End; Pavilion End

International information
- First ODI: 1 April 1996: Pakistan v Sri Lanka
- Last ODI: 7 April 1996: Pakistan v Sri Lanka

The Padang or Singapore Cricket Club Ground is a cricket ground in Singapore. The Padang became a major recreational area when two clubs, the Singapore Cricket Club in 1870 and the Singapore Recreation Club in 1883 were established at both ends of the field. It was used for exercising horses in the 1920s and became the scene for the New Year sporting activities.

Cricket's development in the colony took a back seat due to the world wars, However, after World War II the ground played host to teams such as the touring Australians of 1959. In 2003 came the club was given the go-ahead to pursue extensive re-development to the cost of $17 million, the first change to its structure for nearly 120 years. Improvements include the appropriately named Stumps bar which boasts an outdoor seating area and views of the ground. Further modernisations have improved the gym and other sporting facilities, In 1996 Padang Cricket Ground became the first venue in Singapore to host One Day International (ODI's). The first ODI saw Pakistan play Sri Lanka in the 1995–96 Singer Cup. Four further ODIs were held during the tournament, which also involved India.

== One Day International Matches ==
List of ODI matches hosted at this stadium

S No	Team (A)	Team (B)	Winner	Margin	Year
1	Pakistan	Sri Lanka	no result		1996
2	Pakistan	Sri Lanka	Sri Lanka	By 34 runs	1996
3	India	Sri Lanka	India	By 12 runs	1996
4	India	Pakistan	Pakistan	By 8 wickets	1996
5	Pakistan	Sri Lanka	Pakistan	By 43 runs	1996

== List of Centuries ==
=== One Day Internationals ===
Three One-day international century has been scored at Singapore Cricket Club Ground, Padang

No.	Score	Player	Team	Balls	Inns.	Opposing team	Date	Result
1	100	Sachin Tendulkar	India	111	1	Pakistan	5 April 1996	Lost
2	103*	Rahul Dravid	India	124	1	West Indies	8 September 1999	Lost
3	124	Ricardo Powell	West Indies	93	2	India	8 September 1999	Won
