= Herbert Lyon (cricketer) =

Jersey cricketer, schoolmaster

Personal information
- Full name: Herbert Lyon
- Born: 29 April 1867; Saint Helier, Jersey
- Died: 7 December 1951 (aged 84); Woking, Surrey, England
- Batting: Right-handed
- Role: Wicket-keeper

Domestic team information
- Years: Team
- 1887–1890: Oxford University

Career statistics
Competition	First-class
Matches	3
Runs scored	13
Batting average	3.25
100s/50s	–/–
Top score	9*
Catches/stumpings	1/–
- Source: Cricinfo, 23 May 2020

Herbert Lyon (29 April 1867 – 7 December 1951) was a Jersey first-class cricketer and educator.

The son of William Lyon, he was born at Saint Helier in April 1869. He was educated at Winchester College, before going up to Corpus Christi College, Oxford. While studying at Oxford, he made three appearances in first-class cricket for Oxford University, playing against the Marylebone Cricket Club in 1887 and the touring Australians and the Gentlemen of England in 1890. Lyon had little success in these three matches, scoring a total of 13 runs.

After graduating from Oxford, he became a schoolmaster at Bilton Grange in 1891. He later became the headmaster of Allen House School at Woking. Lyon died at Woking in December 1951.
