= Tharindu Fernando (Italy cricketer) =

Italian cricketer of Sri Lankan origin

Personal information
- Full name: Warnakulasuriya Tharindu Nimantha Fernando
- Born: 1 May 1987 (age 39); Chilaw, Sri Lanka
- Batting: Right-handed
- Bowling: Right-arm fast-medium
- Role: Batsman

International information
- National side: Italy (2013–)

Career statistics
Competition	T20
Matches	1
Runs scored	2
Batting average	2.00
100s/50s	0/0
Top score	2
Catches/stumpings	0/–
- Source: CricketArchive, 8 May 2015

Warnakulasuriya Tharindu Nimantha Fernando (born 1 May 1987) is a Sri Lankan-born former cricketer who made his debut for the Italian national side at the 2013 European T20 Championship.

A right-handed batsman bowling occasional medium pace, Fernando played only a single match in his debut tournament, making a four-ball duck against Guernsey. By winning the European T20 Championship, Italy qualified for the 2013 World Twenty20 Qualifier, where matches had full Twenty20 status. Although he featured in both of Italy's warm-up games (against Bermuda and the Netherlands), in the full tournament Fernando played only in the last game of the competition, the ninth-place playoff against Namibia. In his only full Twenty20 match to date, he scored two runs before being run out by Craig Williams, and did not bowl. Fernando played his first full tournament for Italy in June 2014, playing all six matches at the 2014 WCL Division Four tournament in Singapore. His best performance there came in the match against Malaysia, where he scored 43 from 62 balls coming in seventh in the batting order, featuring in an 82-run sixth-wicket stand with Alessandro Bonora.

Fernando has been included in Italy's squad for its next major tournament, the 2015 European T20 Championship in Jersey.
