= Shahbaz Butt =

Pakistani cricketer (born 1980)

Personal information
- Born: 14 April 1980 (age 46); Lahore, Pakistan
- Source: Cricinfo, 27 November 2015

Shahbaz Butt (born 14 April 1980) is a Pakistani first-class cricketer who played for Lahore cricket team.
