= Chaminda Ruwan =

Sri Lankan cricketer

Personal information
- Full name: Chaminda Ruwan Kumarage
- Born: 29 July 1979 (age 47); Kalutara, Sri Lanka
- Batting: Right-handed
- Bowling: Right-arm fast-medium
- Role: Batsman

Domestic team information
- Years: Team
- 1999–2001: Bloomfield Cricket and Athletic Club
- FC debut: 8 January 1999 Bloomfield v Burgher
- Last FC: 14 December 2001 Bloomfield v Tamil Union
- LA debut: 28 October 2000 Bloomfield v Tamil Union
- Last LA: 9 December 2001 Bloomfield v Tamil Union

Career statistics
Competition	First-class	List A
Matches	11	8
Runs scored	251	127
Batting average	15.68	18.14
100s/50s	0/1	0/0
Top score	54	42
Balls bowled	102	0
Wickets	3	–
Bowling average	20.66	–
5 wickets in innings	0	–
10 wickets in match	0	–
Best bowling	1/3	–
Catches/stumpings	15/0	3/0
- Source: CricketArchive, 19 July 2008

Chaminda Ruwan Kumarage, usually known as Chaminda Ruwan (born 29 July 1979) is a Sri Lankan-born cricketer, who was a captain of the Singapore national cricket team. A right-handed batsman and right-arm fast-medium bowler, he has played for Singapore since 2005 having previously played first-class and List A cricket in his native Sri Lanka for Bloomfield Cricket and Athletic Club.

== Biography ==
=== Sri Lankan career ===
Born in Kalutara in 1979, Chaminda made his first-class debut for Bloomfield Cricket and Athletic Club in January 1999, playing against Burgher Recreation Club and Sinhalese Sports Club. He played just one first-class match in 2000, against Police Sports Club, and made his List A debut that year, playing seven matches between October and November.

His final year in Sri Lankan cricket was in 2001, during which he played seven first-class matches and one List A match before moving to Singapore.

=== Singapore career ===
His debut for Singapore came in the Stan Nagaiah Trophy series against Malaysia in May 2005. He also played ACC Fast Track Countries Tournament matches against Malaysia and Hong Kong that year.

In 2006, he again played in the Stan Nagaiah Trophy series, followed by the ACC Trophy in Kuala Lumpur. He then played ACC Premier League matches against Hong Kong and Nepal and the Saudara Cup match against Malaysia. He played only three times in 2007, the Saudara Cup match and matches against Hong Kong and the UAE in the ACC Twenty20 Cup.

He captained Singapore for the first time in the 2008 Stan Nagaiah Trophy series and most recently played for Singapore in Division Five of the World Cricket League in Jersey. He again captained Singapore in the ACC Trophy Elite tournament in July 2008.

He won the player of the tournament award and helped Singapore team to promote to ACC Division 3.

In October 2018, he was named in Singapore's squad in the Eastern sub-region group for the 2018–19 ICC World Twenty20 Asia Qualifier tournament.
