= Peter Gough =

Jersey cricketer (born 1984)

Personal information
- Born: 13 December 1984 (age 41)
- Batting: Left-handed

International information
- National side: Jersey
- Source: ESPNcricinfo

Peter Gough (born 13 December 1984) is a cricketer who plays for Jersey. In 2014 he captained Jersey in the 2014 ICC World Cricket League Division Four. He was selected as captain for the 2015 ICC World Twenty20 Qualifier tournament and the 2016 ICC World Cricket League Division Four matches held in Los Angeles.

In September 2017, he scored the most runs for Jersey in the 2017 ICC World Cricket League Division Five tournament, with a total of 220 runs in five matches. In April 2018, he was named in Jersey's squad for the 2018 ICC World Cricket League Division Four tournament in Malaysia.
