= Shahrulnizam Yusof =

Malaysian cricketer (born 1990)

Personal information
- Born: 15 February 1990 (age 36); Kuantan, Malaysia
- Batting: Left-handed

International information
- National side: Malaysia
- Source: Cricinfo, 24 October 2014

Shahrulnizam Yusof (born 15 February 1990) is a Malaysian cricketer. A left-handed batsman, he played in the 2014 ICC World Cricket League Division Three tournament.
