= Amjad Khan (cricketer, born 1980) =

Danish-British cricketer (born 1980)

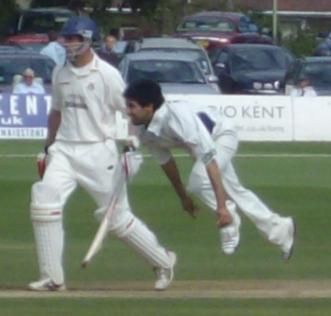

Personal information
- Full name: Amjad Khan
- Born: 14 October 1980 (age 46); Copenhagen, Denmark
- Nickname: Ammy
- Height: 6 ft 0 in (1.83 m)
- Batting: Right-handed
- Bowling: Right-arm fast-medium
- Role: Bowler

International information
- National sides: England (2009); Denmark (1998–2001, 2014–present)
- Only Test (cap 642): 6 March 2009; England v West Indies
- T20I debut (cap 42/23): 15 March 2009; England v West Indies
- Last T20I: 8 May 2022; Denmark v Finland
- T20I shirt no.: 28

Domestic team information
- Years: Team
- 2001–2010: Kent
- 2011–2013: Sussex

Career statistics
Competition	Test	T20I	FC	LA
Matches	1	9	108	74
Runs scored	0	49	1,466	321
Batting average	–	7.00	16.85	11.46
100s/50s	0/0	0/0	0/6	0/1
Top score	0	16	78	65*
Balls bowled	174	137	17,949	2,912
Wickets	1	7	347	76
Bowling average	122.00	21.42	31.62	32.94
5 wickets in innings	0	0	10	0
10 wickets in match	0	0	0	0
Best bowling	1/111	2/25	6/52	4/26
Catches/stumpings	0/–	0/–	26/–	17/–
- Source: CricInfo, 18 February 2023

Amjad Khan (born 14 October 1980) is an international cricketer and barrister. Born in Denmark, he represents the country of his birth in international cricket, while also playing a single Test and a Twenty20 International for England in 2009. In a county cricket career lasting over a decade, he played for Kent and Sussex.

== Early life ==
Khan was born in Frederiksberg, a suburb of Copenhagen. He is the son of Pakistani parents Aslam and Raisa, who immigrated to Denmark in the 1970s. He was educated at the Falkonergårdens Gymnasium.

Khan took up cricket at the age of six and played his early cricket for Kjøbenhavns Boldklub. As a teenager, he was regarded as one of the quickest bowlers in Denmark.

== English county cricket ==
Khan was brought to the attention of Kent County Cricket Club by Ole Mortensen, a friend and former teammate of Kent coach John Wright. In his first full season at Kent County Cricket Club, in 2002, he claimed 63 wickets. He failed to retain his form over the next two seasons, taking a combined total of 31 wickets.

In the seasons that followed, Khan performed better, taking 55 wickets in 2005 and 34 the season after, despite missing almost half of it through injury. In December 2006, Khan was awarded British citizenship, which made him eligible to be selected for England. It only took one month for the English selectors to recognise him, when they named him as part of a 14-man England 'A' squad to tour Bangladesh. Subsequently, he was named in the 30-man World Cup squad, although he was not selected in the final squad when it was halved to 15.

At the end of February 2007, Khan was ruled out for the entire 2007 season, after having surgery on his cruciate ligaments. However, following the 2008 season, Khan was named as one of the members of the "Development squad" of fringe players, to be sent to India as back-ups to the main England squad, because he had "impressed with his pace and swing".

He gave away 16 runs in his first and only over during the Twenty20 Cup Semi-final, where Marcus Trescothick smashed four successive boundaries. Khan joined Sussex for the 2011 season replacing Corey Collymore

On 20 March 2014, Sussex announced they had released Khan after his 2013 season was disrupted by injury.

== International career ==
=== Early years with Denmark ===
Khan played for the Denmark under-19s at the 1998 Under-19 Cricket World Cup in South Africa. He made his senior debut for Denmark at the age of 17, against Ireland at the 1998 European Cricket Championship. He was the youngest national team player in Danish history. In his next game, against Scotland, he took 3/34.

At the 2001 ICC Trophy, Khan took 16 wickets from nine matches with best figures of 3/11. He also scored 73 runs against Hong Kong in the opening game of the tournament.

=== England ===
In November 2008, Khan was called up (along with Sajid Mahmood) to act as cover for Stuart Broad and Andrew Flintoff during the One Day International series in India. He never actually joined up with the one-day squad due to the 2008 Mumbai attacks, which forced the cancellation of the rest of the series. However, he was subsequently called up to the Test squad in place of the injured Ryan Sidebottom for the two-match series that followed.

On 18 February 2009, Khan, along with Ravi Bopara, was invited to join the England Test squad on their tour of the West Indies as cover for Andrew Flintoff who was struggling with a hip injury.

Khan played in his only Test in the fifth Test against the West Indies on 6 March 2009. His first over consisted of 9 balls, which included 3 no-balls, costing 7 runs. Khan took his only Test wicket early on the third day of the Test, trapping in-form batsman Ramnaresh Sarwan LBW. He was reprimanded by the match referee for excessive appealing. When it was announced that fast-bowler Ryan Sidebottom would be unable to play in the ODIs or T20s following the Test series because of a recurring injury, Khan was named as his replacement.

=== Return to Denmark ===
Khan returned to play for Denmark at the 2014 ICC World Cricket League Division Four in Singapore. Khan captained Denmark in the 2016 ICC World Cricket League Division Four in Los Angeles, after team captain Michael Pedersen left the tournament to attend to a family emergency. In October 2021, he was named in Denmark's T20I squad for the Regional Final of the 2021 ICC Men's T20 World Cup Europe Qualifier tournament. He made his T20I debut for Denmark on 15 October 2021 against Italy. This came over 12 years after his sole T20I appearance for England in 2009, setting a new record for the longest gap between T20I appearances. However, his record was surpassed by Bermuda's Kyle Hodsoll the following month.

== Legal career ==
Khan is a barrister and in 2022 represented former cricketer Jahid Ahmed in his case against Essex.

== See also ==
- One Test Wonder
- List of Test cricketers born in non-Test playing nations
