= Luis di Giglio =

Italian cricketer

Personal information
- Full name: Luis di Giglio
- Born: 22 May 1989 (age 37); Bahía Blanca, Argentina
- Batting: Right-handed
- Bowling: Left-arm medium

International information
- National side: Italy

Career statistics
Competition	Twenty20
Matches	1
Runs scored	3
Batting average	3.00
100s/50s	–/–
Top score	3
Balls bowled	12
Wickets	–
Bowling average	–
5 wickets in innings	–
10 wickets in match	–
Best bowling	–
Catches/stumpings	–/–
- Source: Cricinfo, 2 June 2012

Luis di Giglio (born 22 May 1989) is an Argentine-born Italian cricketer. Di Giglio is a right-handed batsman who bowls left-arm medium pace. He was born in Buenos Aires, Argentina, and was educated at the University of Bologna.

Di Giglio made his debut for Italy in the 2010 European Cricket Championship Division One in Jersey, making three appearances in the tournament against the Netherlands A, Denmark, and Jersey. He was later selected as part of Italy's squad for the 2012 World Twenty20 Qualifier in the United Arab Emirates. He made a single Twenty20 appearance during the tournament, against Kenya, bowling two wicketless overs in Kenya's innings of 170/5, while in Italy's chase, he was dismissed for 3 runs by Hiren Varaiya.

In April 2013, he was selected in Italy's fourteen man squad for the World Cricket League Division Three in Bermuda. In November 2019, he was named in Italy's squad for the Cricket World Cup Challenge League B tournament in Oman. He made his List A debut, for Italy against Kenya, on 3 December 2019.
