= Kamran Mahmood =

Danish cricketer (born 1993)

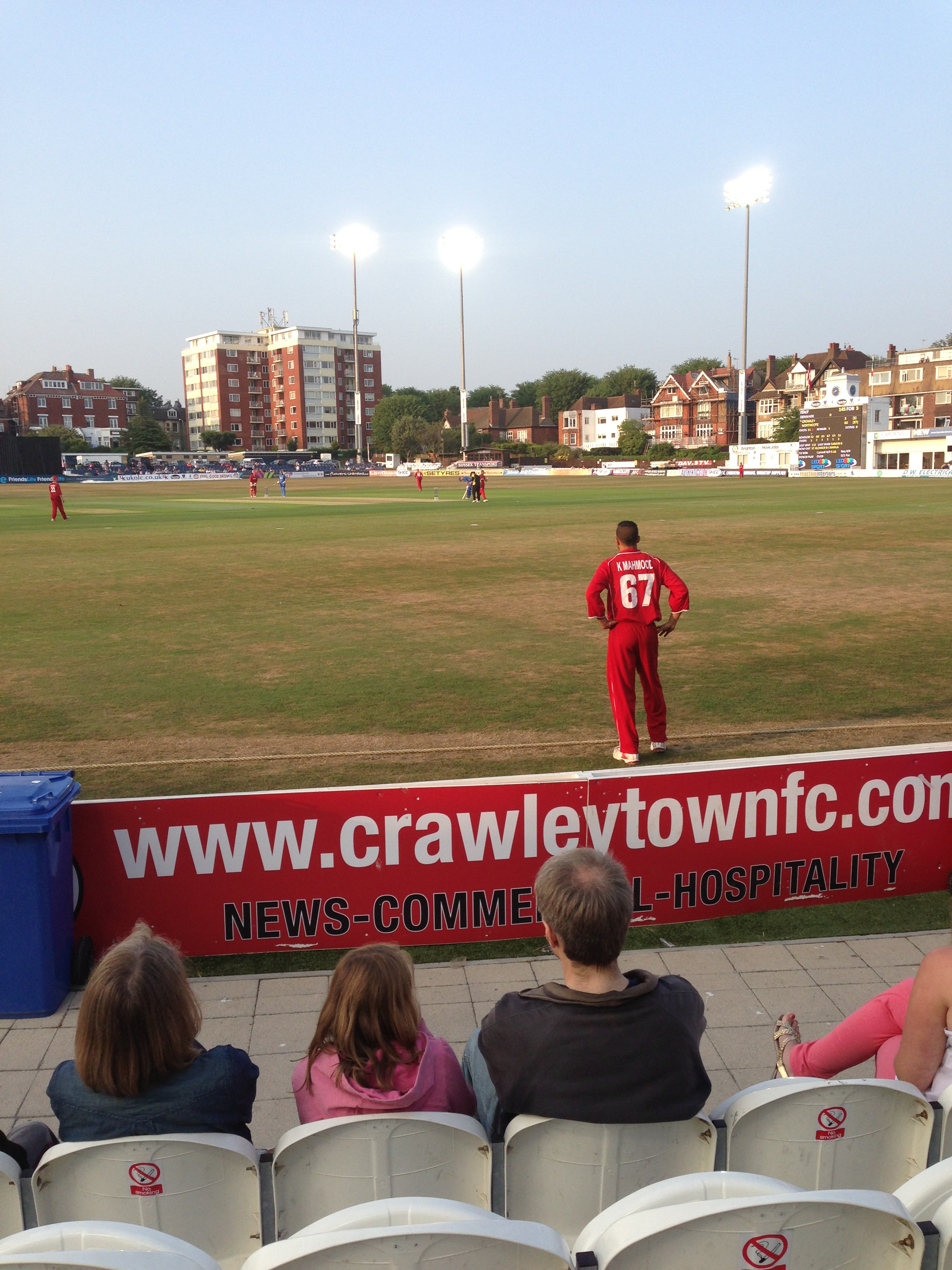
- Mahmood fielding in July 2013

Personal information
- Full name: Kamran Tariq Mahmood
- Born: 20 January 1993 (age 33); Århus, Århus County, Denmark
- Batting: Right-handed
- Bowling: Right-arm fast-medium
- Relatives: Rizwan Mahmood (brother)

International information
- National side: Denmark

Career statistics
Competition	Twenty20
Matches	7
Runs scored	53
Batting average	10.60
100s/50s	–/–
Top score	25*
Balls bowled	12
Wickets	–
Bowling average	–
5 wickets in innings	–
10 wickets in match	–
Best bowling	–
Catches/stumpings	–/–
- Source: Cricinfo, 23 March 2012

Kamran Tariq Mahmood (born 20 January 1993) is a Danish cricketer. He is a right-handed batsman who bowls right-arm fast-medium. He was born at Århus, Århus County.

Having represented Denmark at the Under-19 level, Mahmood made his full debut in the 2011 Nordic Cup against Finland, before playing in the European T20 Championship Division One which was held in Jersey and Guernsey.

In March 2012, Denmark took part in the World Twenty20 Qualifier in the United Arab Emirates, having qualified for the event by winning the European T20 Championship. Mahmood was selected in Denmark's fourteen-man squad for the qualifier, making his Twenty20 debut against Bermuda at the Sharjah Cricket Association Stadium. He made six further appearances during the competition, the last of which came against Hong Kong, with him scoring a total of 53 runs in the tournament at an average of 10.60, with a high score of 25 not out.

His older brother, Rizwan, also plays for Denmark.
