= Fida Hussain =

Pakistani-born cricketer (born 1988)

Personal information
- Full name: Fida Hussain
- Born: 10 June 1988 (age 38); Pakistan
- Batting: Right-handed
- Bowling: Right-arm medium
- Role: Bowler

International information
- National side: Italy
- T20I debut (cap 3): 25 May 2019 v Germany
- Last T20I: 25 May 2019 v Germany

Career statistics
Competition	T20I	LA	T20
Matches	2	4	2
Runs scored	3	7	3
Batting average	–	–	–
100s/50s	0/0	0/0	0/0
Top score	3*	7*	3*
Balls bowled	–	146	–
Wickets	–	5	–
Bowling average	–	23.80	–
5 wickets in innings	–	0	–
10 wickets in match	–	0	–
Best bowling	–	2/20	–
Catches/stumpings	0/–	1/–	0/–
- Source: Cricinfo, 12 February 2026

Fida Hussain (born 10 June 1988) is a Pakistani-born cricketer who played for Italy national cricket team between 2019 and 2024.

== Early life and education ==
Hussain was born on 10 June 1988 in Pakistan. He moved to Italy as a teenager and settled in Brescia after arriving at the age of thirteen. He joining a large South Asian community where cricket had taken root. He learned the game in Pakistan but has credited his development to years spent playing and training in Brescia's club system.

== Career ==
He was named in Italy's squad for the 2017 ICC World Cricket League Division Five tournament in South Africa. He played in Guernsey's opening fixture, against Guernsey, on 3 September 2017.

In May 2019, he was named in Italy's squad for their Twenty20 International (T20I) series against Germany in the Netherlands. He made his T20I debut for Italy against Germany on 25 May 2019. In November 2019, he was named in Italy's squad for the Cricket World Cup Challenge League B tournament in Oman.

Hussain returned to international duty in early 2024 during the ICC Cricket World Cup Challenge League Play-off in Malaysia, where Italy finished runners-up to secure their place in the next Challenge League. He made his List A debut for Italy in that event on 22 February 2024. In Italy's opening win over Bermuda he took two wickets for twenty, including the lbw dismissal of Bermudian captain Terryn Fray, in a 157-run victory.
