= Damian Fernando =

Italian/Sri Lankan cricketer (born 1982)

Mutunama Gonnege Damian Clode Kithsiri Fernando (born 18 February 1982), known as Damian Fernando, is an Italian cricketer of Sri Lankan origin. He is a right-handed batsman and right-arm medium-fast bowler.

Born in Marawila, Fernando made a single first-class appearance for Chilaw Marians during the 2002–03 season, against Antonians. From the lower-middle order, he scored a duck in the only innings in which he batted. He made four List A appearances for the team during the same season, scoring 33 runs in three innings (including a top score of 24 against Sri Lanka Air Force).

In April 2013, Fernando was selected in Italy's fourteen man squad for the World Cricket League Division Three in Bermuda. He has since played in several other tournaments for the Italian national side.

== See also ==
- List of Chilaw Marians Cricket Club players
