= Basit Raja =

Danish cricketer

Personal information
- Full name: Raja Basit Javed
- Born: 2 September 1993 (age 33); Copenhagen, Denmark
- Batting: Right-handed
- Bowling: Right-arm fast-medium

International information
- National side: Denmark

Career statistics
Competition	Twenty20
Matches	8
Runs scored	27
Batting average	9.00
100s/50s	–/–
Top score	11*
Balls bowled	150
Wickets	2
Bowling average	88.00
5 wickets in innings	–
10 wickets in match	–
Best bowling	1/26
Catches/stumpings	–/–
- Source: Cricinfo, 23 March 2012

Raja Basit Javed (born 2 September 1993) is a Danish cricketer who is more commonly known as Basit Raja. Raja is a right-handed batsman who bowls right-arm fast-medium. He was born at Copenhagen.

Having represented Denmark at Under-19 level, Raja was selected as part of Denmark's squad for World Cricket League Division Three in Hong Kong, making his full international debut against Papua New Guinea. He made a total of three appearances during the tournament.

In March 2012, Denmark took part in the World Twenty20 Qualifier in the United Arab Emirates, with Raja selected in their fourteen-man squad. Raja made his Twenty20 debut during the tournament against Bermuda at the Sheikh Zayed Cricket Stadium. He made seven further appearances during the competition, the last of which came against Oman, scoring 27 runs and taking 2 wickets.

In March 2018, he was named in Denmark's squad for the 2018 ICC World Cricket League Division Four tournament in Malaysia. In September 2018, he was named in Denmark's squad for the 2018 ICC World Cricket League Division Three tournament in Oman.
