= Frederik Klokker =

Danish cricketer (born 1983)

Personal information
- Full name: Frederik Andreas Klokker
- Born: 13 March 1983 (age 43); Odense, Funen County, Denmark
- Nickname: Freddie
- Height: 5 ft 11 in (1.80 m)
- Batting: Left-handed
- Role: Wicket-keeper

International information
- National side: Denmark (2000–present)
- T20I debut (cap 21): 14 August 2021 v Sweden
- Last T20I: 4 July 2022 v Portugal
- T20I shirt no.: 30

Domestic team information
- Years: Team
- 2006: Warwickshire
- 2007–2009: Derbyshire (squad no. 71)
- 2009–2010: Suffolk
- 2012: Sylhet Royals

Career statistics
Competition	T20I	FC	LA	T20
Matches	13	9	33	28
Runs scored	59	424	898	374
Batting average	29.50	32.16	34.53	22.00
100s/50s	0/0	2/–	1/7	0/1
Top score	29*	103*	138*	50
Catches/stumpings	6/2	19/–	29/6	8/9
- Source: Cricinfo, 5 July 2022

Frederik Andreas Klokker (born 13 March 1983) is a Danish cricketer, who has played for Denmark's national cricket team. Klokker is a left-handed batsman and wicket-keeper. He was born in Odense, Funen County. In August 2021, he made his Twenty20 International (T20I) debut for the Danish national side as the team's captain.

== Early career ==
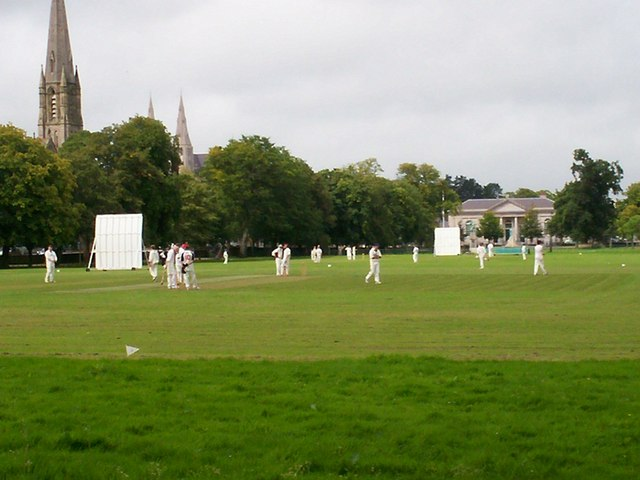
Klokker scored his maiden List A century against the United States in the 2005 ICC Trophy at The Mall, Armagh (pictured).

Having played six Youth One Day Internationals for Denmark Under-19s in the 1998 Under-19 World Cup, Klokker made his debut for Denmark in a List A match against Ireland in the 2000 ICC Emerging Nations Tournament in Zimbabwe. Shortly after this match, he played his second List A match against the Durham Cricket Board in English domestic crickets 2000 NatWest Trophy, a tournament Denmark were permitted to take part in. He featured in the 2001 ICC Trophy in Canada, making nine appearances. He scored 147 runs in the tournament, at an average of 18.37 and with a high score of 36. In August of that year, he made a further List A appearance in the first round of 2002 Cheltenham & Gloucester Trophy (previously the NatWest Trophy) against Suffolk. The match was played in 2001 to avoid fixture congestion in the following season.

In 2002, Klokker joined the Marylebone Cricket Club Young Cricketer's programme. Two further List A appearances followed, one in that season in the 1st round of the 2003 Cheltenham & Gloucester Trophy against the Leicestershire Cricket Board, played to the same arrangement as the previous season's fixture, and another in the 2004 Cheltenham & Gloucester Trophy against Wales Minor Counties, played in 2003. Klokker was a substitute fielder for England during their Test match against New Zealand at Lord's in May 2004. In 2005, Klokker appeared in his second and final ICC Trophy, which was held in Ireland. The International Cricket Council afforded List A status to these matches, with him making seven appearances during the tournament. Klokker had a successful tournament with the bat, scoring 218 runs at an average of 54.50, while in the process recording his maiden century against the United States at The Mall, Armagh.

== County cricket ==
Klokker trialled for Warwickshire in 2005, while playing club cricket for Berkswell near Coventry, Warwickshire, and working for a stamp collecting company. He went on to make his first-class debut for Warwickshire in the 2006 County Championship against Sussex at Hove, following injuries to regular wicket-keepers Tim Ambrose and Tony Frost. This made him the fifth Dane to play county cricket; Ole Mortensen, Soren Henriksen, Thomas Hansen and Amjad Khan are the others. He took three catches in Sussex's first-innings, while in Warwickshire's first-innings he batted as a nightwatchman, scoring 40 before being dismissed by Luke Wright. This was his only first-class appearance for Warwickshire, though he did appear in a single List A match for the county in that same season, against Durham in the Cheltenham & Gloucester Trophy. These were his only appearances for the county.

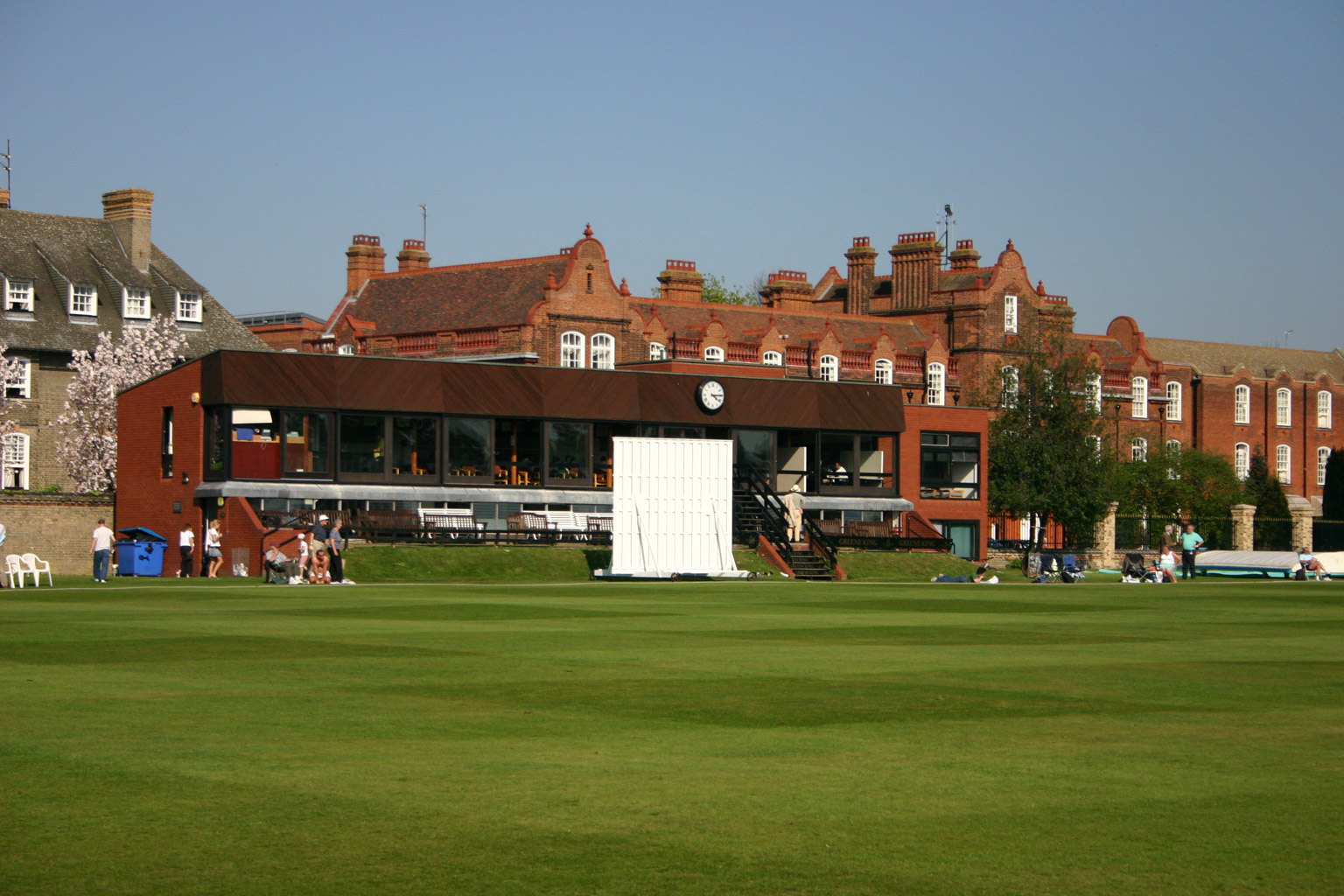
Klokker became the first Dane to score a first-class century when he made an unbeaten 110 against Cambridge UCCE at Fenner's in 2007.

In 2007 he joined Derbyshire as reserve wicket-keeper, making his debut for the county in a first-class match against Cambridge UCCE in April 2007, scoring his maiden first-class century with a score of 100 not out, in doing so he became the first Dane to make a first-class century. He featured once more for Derbyshire in that season, against Northamptonshire in the County Championship. Later in 2007, Klokker was selected as part of Denmark's squad for the World Cricket League Division Two in Namibia. He captained Denmark during the tournament, making six List A appearances, scoring 316 runs at an average of 316, with a high score of 99 not out against the United Arab Emirates, one of two half centuries he made during the tournament.

For the 2008 season he stayed with Derbyshire and went on their pre-season tour to the Caribbean. He broke into Derbyshire's first eleven during the early part of this season, following an injury to wicket-keeper James Pipe. In his second first-class match of the season against Warwickshire in the County Championship, he scored his second century with a score of 103 not out off 278 balls, having been dismissed for a golden duck in Derbyshire's first-innings by Neil Carter. He made four first-class appearances during that season, scoring 160 runs at an average of 22.85. He also made three appearances in the Friends Provident Trophy.

Klokker was selected to captain Denmark in the World Cup Qualifier in South Africa, where he made seven List A appearances, including his final appearance to date in that format, against Oman. He scored 140 runs during the tournament at average of 20.00, with a high score of 77 which came against the United Arab Emirates. Denmark failed to qualify for the 2011 World Cup and finished the tournament in 16th and last place. During the 2009 English domestic season, Klokker made two first-class appearances for Derbyshire against Kent and Surrey, scoring 53 runs with a high score of 32 not out. These were his final appearances for the county, having made a total of eight first-class appearances for Derbyshire, scoring 384 runs at an average of 32.00, while taking 16 catches. With his opportunities limited at Derbyshire, he also appeared in Minor counties cricket for Suffolk in this season, making his debut Staffordshire in the MCCA Knockout Trophy, making three further appearances in that season's competition, plus a single appearance in the Minor Counties Championship against Lincolnshire.

== Later career ==
He was released by Derbyshire following the 2009 season, but continued to feature in Minor counties cricket with Suffolk, making five Minor Counties Championship and four MCCA Knockout Trophy appearances. He didn't feature for the county following the 2010 season .In 2008 against UAE he carried his bat by scoring 99 runs and became the only batsman to do so in List A cricket. In 2011, Klokker was selected as part of Denmark's squad for the 2011 ICC World Cricket League Division Three tournament in Hong Kong, though he had by this point been replaced as captain by Michael Pedersen. He made six appearances during the tournament, scoring 202 runs at an average of 40.40, with a high score of 101 not out which came against the United States. Despite being Denmark's leading run scorer, they were relegated to 2012 World Cricket League Division Four. Later in 2011, he featured in the European T20 Championship Division One which was held in Jersey and Guernsey.

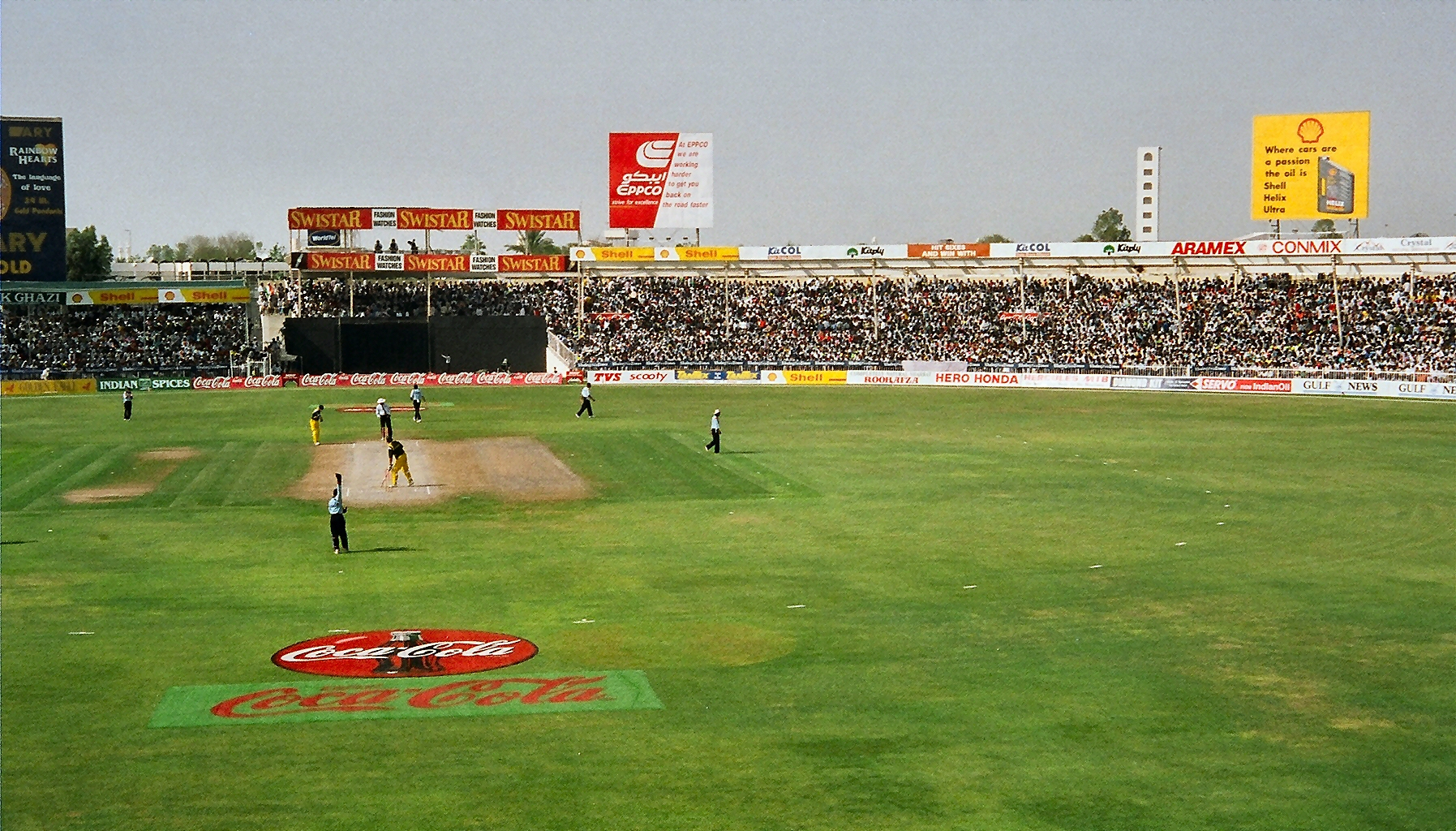
Klokker made his debut in Twenty20 cricket against Bermuda at Sharjah.

In January 2012, Klokker was included in the auction for the 2012 Bangladesh Premier League. This was due to a rule stating that players from Associate and Affiliate teams must be included. He was signed by Sylhet Royals for $25,000, but didn't feature in any of the team's matches, due to the presence of former Pakistani Test wicket-keeper Kamran Akmal.

In March 2012, Denmark took part in the World Twenty20 Qualifier in the United Arab Emirates, having qualified for the event by winning the European T20 Championship. Klokker was selected in Denmark's fourteen man squad for the qualifier. He made his Twenty20 debut during the tournament against Bermuda at the Sharjah Cricket Association Stadium, during this match he became the first Dane to score a half century in the format, with a score of 50. He made seven further appearances during the competition, the last of which came against Oman. He scored a total of 219 runs at an average of 27.37, with a high score of 50. Klokker was Denmark's leading scoring during the qualifier, despite this they finished in 16th and last place.

In August 2012, he was selected in Denmark's fourteen man squad for the World Cricket League Division Four in Malaysia. In March 2018, he was named in Denmark's squad for the 2018 ICC World Cricket League Division Four tournament, also in Malaysia. In Denmark's opening match, against Bermuda, he scored 108 not out. He was the leading run-scorer for Denmark in the tournament, with 221 runs in five matches.

In September 2018, he was named in Denmark's squad for the 2018 ICC World Cricket League Division Three tournament in Oman. In August 2019, he was named in Denmark's squad for the 2019 Malaysia Cricket World Cup Challenge League A tournament. In July 2020, Klokker suggested that a European XI team could play in the Inter-Provincial Championship in Ireland, to give more experience to European cricketers playing in first-class cricket matches. In August 2021, Klokker was named as the captain of the Danish team, for their three-match Twenty20 International (T20I) series against Sweden. He made his T20I debut on 14 August 2021, for Denmark against Sweden. In October 2021, he was named as the captain of Denmark's T20I squad for the Regional Final of the 2021 ICC Men's T20 World Cup Europe Qualifier tournament.
