= Jersey cricket team =

Represents the Bailiwick of Jersey

Jersey
- Nickname: Jer lions
- Association: Jersey Cricket Board

Personnel
- Captain: Charles Perchard
- Coach: Neil MacRae

International Cricket Council
- ICC status: Associate member (2007)
- ICC region: Europe
ICC Rankings	Current	Best-ever
T20I	29th	23rd (21 May 2022)

International cricket
- First international: Jersey v. Guernsey (Saint Helier, Jersey; 14 August 1922)

One Day Internationals
- First ODI: v Canada at United Ground, Windhoek; 27 March 2023
- Last ODI: v United Arab Emirates at Wanderers Cricket Ground, Windhoek; 5 April 2023
ODIs	Played	Won/Lost
Total	5	1/4 (0 ties, 0 no results)

T20 Internationals
- First T20I: v Guernsey at College Field, Saint Peter Port; 31 May 2019
- Last T20I: v Guernsey at Happy Valley Ground, Episkopi; 23 May 2026
T20Is	Played	Won/Lost
Total	61	42/18 (1 tie, 0 no results)
This year	5	5/0 (0 ties, 0 no results)
- T20 World Cup Qualifier appearances: 4 (Note: For the 2024 and 2026 Men's T20 World Cups, the final round of qualification in Europe was the ICC Europe Regional Final.) (first in 2015)
- Best result: 3rd place (2025)
List A & T20I kit
- As of 23 May 2026

The Jersey men's cricket team represents the Bailiwick of Jersey, a Crown dependency, in international cricket. They became an affiliate member of the International Cricket Council (ICC) in 2005, and an associate member in 2007.

== History ==
Jersey first played international cricket against neighbouring Channel Island of Guernsey in the inaugural annual Inter-insular match in 1950. They won ten matches in a row between 1992 and 2001, before a run of five consecutive victories for Guernsey until 2006.

Jersey became an affiliate member of the ICC in 2005, and took part in Division Two of the European Championship in Scotland in 2006, losing to Norway in the final. The following March, they beat Italy in a three-match series that they had to win to be promoted to associate membership of the ICC. They were granted associate status at an ICC meeting at Lord's in June.

In August, Jersey won the inter-insular by 4 runs to end Guernsey's run of wins, but lost the first inter-insular Twenty20 match in September by five wickets.

- 2008, Jersey hosted Division Five of the World Cricket League in May. Jersey performed well and topped Group B after the group qualifying matches. Jersey then beat the United States in their semi-final before losing the final to Afghanistan. As Division Five runners-up, Jersey were promoted to Division Four of the World Cricket League.
- 2008, Jersey travelled to neighbours Guernsey in August to take part in Division Two of the European Championship against; Croatia, France, Germany, Gibraltar and Guernsey. Jersey improved on their 2006 performance, edging out Guernsey by one run in the final group match to win the tournament undefeated.
- 2008, Jersey travelled to Tanzania in October to participate in Division Four of the World Cricket League. Division Four proved to be a step too far for Jersey, as with a series of poor batting displays Jersey won only one group match, before losing to Fiji in a positional playoff and finishing sixth. On the basis of their sixth-place finish in this tournament, Jersey were relegated back to Division Five.
- 2010 ICC World Cricket League Division Five in Nepal, they finished 5th to be relegated to 2011 ICC World Cricket League Division Six in Malaysia, where they finished 4th to remain in Division Six.
- 2011 ICC European T20 Championship Division One, hosted by Jersey, losing to Italy in semi-final.
- 2013 ICC European T20 Championship Division One, Jersey losing to Italy in semi-final.
- 2013 ICC World Cricket League Division Six, Jersey remained unbeaten in their 5 games, going on to win and gain promotion to WCL5
- 2014 ICC World Cricket League Division Five was held in March in Malaysia. Jersey were again unbeaten and gained promotion to WCL4.
- 2014 ICC World Cricket League Division Four matches, saw Jersey win only one of their 5 matches in the round robin and were relegated to WCL5.
- 2015 ICC Europe Division One competition saw Jersey come out on top and win entry into the ICC World Twenty20 Qualifier.
- 2015 ICC World Twenty20 Qualifier held in Scotland and Ireland in July saw Jersey end in 6th place in Group A, 11th overall.
- 2016 ICC World Cricket League Division Five competition saw an improved result winning four out of five and promotion back to WCL4
- 2016 ICC World Cricket League Division Four competition took place in Los Angeles. Two wins was not sufficient, leading to demotion to WCL5

=== 2018-Present ===
In April 2018, the ICC decided to grant full Twenty20 International (T20I) status to all its members. Therefore, all Twenty20 matches played between Jersey and other ICC members after 1 January 2019 have the T20I status.

In September 2018, Jersey qualified from Group B of the 2018–19 ICC World Twenty20 Europe Qualifier to the Regional Finals of the tournament.

Jersey played their first T20I against Guernsey on 31 May 2019.

31 May 2019
16:00 (D/N)
Scorecard

Jersey; 128/9 (20 overs)	v	Guernsey; 128/8 (20 overs)
Corey Bisson 26 (25); Nic Buckle 3/26 (4 overs)		Josh Butler 22 (25); Elliot Miles 3/17 (4 overs)

Match tied
(Jersey won the Super Over)
College Field, Saint Peter Port
Umpires: Neil Hall (Gue) and Martin Tolcher (Gue)
Player of the match: Dominic Blampied (Jer)

- Guernsey won the toss and elected to field.

On 27 March 2023, Jersey played their first ever One Day International (ODI) match, against Canada in the 2023 Cricket World Cup Qualifier Play-off.

27 March 2023
09:30
Scorecard

Canada; 238/8 (50 overs)	v	Jersey; 207 (47.5 overs)
Srimantha Wijeyeratne 63 (91); Charles Perchard 3/38 (10 overs)		Josh Lawrenson 66 (101); Jeremy Gordon 3/30 (8.5 overs)

Canada won by 31 runs
United Cricket Club Ground, Windhoek
Umpires: David Odhiambo (Ken) and Isaac Oyieko (Ken)
Player of the match: Nikhil Dutta (Can)

- Jersey won the toss and elected to field.

On 1 April 2023, Jersey recorded their first win in ODIs, beating Papua New Guinea. Josh Lawrenson became the first cricketer for Jersey to score an ODI century (114), and he was followed by Asa Tribe (115 not out).

1 April 2023
09:30
Scorecard

Jersey; 291/4 (50 overs)	v	Papua New Guinea; 280/9 (50 overs)
Asa Tribe 115* (143); Chad Soper 2/40 (9 overs)		Assad Vala 75 (107); Elliot Miles 2/35 (8 overs)

Jersey won by 11 runs
United Ground, Windhoek
Umpires: Andrew Louw (Nam) and Patric Makumbi (Uga)
Player of the match: Josh Lawrenson (Jer)

- Jersey won the toss and elected to bat.

In September 2023, a Jersey team made up of a mixture of senior players and young talents won their group to reach finals week at the T10 European Cricket Championship in Málaga, Spain. Returning for the championship round in October, the team finished sixth.

On 7 July 2024, Harrison Carlyon became the first Jersey player to score a century in a T20I when he made 110 off 57 balls against Serbia during the 2024–25 ICC Men's T20 World Cup Europe Qualifier at Bayer Uerdingen Cricket Ground, Krefeld, Germany. Jersey went unbeaten throughout the tournament, defeating Norway in the final.

In July 2025, Jersey finished third at the T20 World Cup Europe Regional Final, missing out on a place at the 2026 T20 World Cup on net run-rate having finished level on points with second place Italy. The islanders won two of their matches, against Guernsey and Scotland, and lost to hosts the Netherlands, while their fixture with the Italians was abandoned without a ball being bowled due to rain.

In May 2026, Jersey won the T20 World Cup Europe Sub-regional Qualifier A in Cyprus to make it through to the final round of qualifying for the T20 World Cup for the sixth time. Having topped their group with four wins from four matches, they defeated Guernsey in the final by four-wickets, chasing down a target of 140 with two overs to spare.

In October 2026, Jersey won the Cricket World Cup Challenge League A, clinching the top spot with three matches to spare, and as a result advanced to the 2026 Cricket World Cup Qualifier Play-off.

== Grounds ==
Locations of all grounds which have hosted international cricket matches within Jersey

== Tournament history ==
Legend

- Champions
- Runners-up
- Third place/Semi-finals
- Hosts
- Q Qualified/Advanced to next stage
- DNQ Did not qualify
- ▲ Promoted
- Remained in the same division
- ▼ Relegated

=== Cricket World Cup ===
Cricket World Cup record								Qualification record				
Year	Round	Position	Pld	W	L	T	NR	Pld	W	L	T	NR
(England) 1975	Not an ICC member							No qualifiers held				
(England) 1979	Not an ICC member							Not an ICC member				
(England) (Wales) 1983	Not an ICC member							Not an ICC member				
(India) (Pakistan) 1987	Not an ICC member							Not an ICC member				
(Australia) (New Zealand) 1992	Not an ICC member							Not an ICC member				
(India) (Pakistan) (Sri Lanka) 1996	Not an ICC member							Not an ICC member				
(England) (Wales) (Scotland) (Republic of Ireland) (Netherlands) 1999	Not an ICC member							Not an ICC member				
(South Africa) (Zimbabwe) (Kenya) 2003	Not an ICC member							Not an ICC member				
(Cricket West Indies) 2007	Did not enter							Did not enter				
(India) (Sri Lanka) (Bangladesh) 2011	Did not qualify							13	6	6	0	1
(Australia) (New Zealand) 2015	Did not qualify							12	5	7	0	0
(England) (Wales) 2019	Did not qualify							29	20	9	0	0
(India) 2023	Did not qualify							20	12	8	0	0
(South Africa) (Namibia) (Zimbabwe) 2027	To be determined							10*	8	1	1	0
Total	—N/a	0/14	–	–	–	–	–	84	51	31	1	1

=== Men's T20 World Cup ===
Men's T20 World Cup record								Qualification record				
Year	Round	Position	Pld	W	L	T	NR	Pld	W	L	T	NR
(South Africa) 2007	Not eligible							Not eligible				
(England) 2009	Not eligible							Not eligible				
(Cricket West Indies) 2010	Not eligible							Not eligible				
(Sri Lanka) 2012	Did not qualify							7	5	2	0	0
(Bangladesh) 2014	Did not qualify							6	4	2	0	0
(India) 2016	Did not qualify							11	6	5	0	0
(United Arab Emirates) (Oman) 2021	Did not qualify							16	11	5	0	0
(Australia) 2022	Did not qualify							11	2	9	0	0
(United States) (Cricket West Indies) 2024	Did not qualify							6	3	3	0	0
(India) (Sri Lanka) 2026	Did not qualify							9	6	1	0	2
(Australia) (New Zealand) 2028	To be determined							5*	5	0	0	0
Total	—N/a	0/10	–	–	–	–	–	71	42	27	0	2

=== T20 World Cup Qualifier ===
T20 World Cup Qualifier record
Year	Round	Position	Pld	W	L	T	NR	Qual.
(Ireland) 2008	Not eligible							
(United Arab Emirates) 2010	Not eligible							
(United Arab Emirates) 2012	Did not qualify							
(United Arab Emirates) 2013	Did not qualify							
(Ireland) (Scotland) 2015	Group stage	11/14	6	2	4	0	0	DNQ
(United Arab Emirates) 2019	Group stage	10/14	6	3	3	0	0	DNQ
(Zimbabwe) 2022	Play-offs	7/8	5	2	3	0	0	DNQ
(To be determined) 2028	To be determined							
Total	0 Titles	3/8	17	7	10	0	0	—N/a

=== Other global tournaments ===
CWC Challenge League (List A)	CWC Qualifier Play-off (ODI)	World Cricket League (LA/ODI/50 overs)
2019–22 (B): Winners (Q,); 2024–26 (A): In progress	2023: 5th place (DNQ)	2008 (Division Five) : Runners-up (▲); 2008 (Division Four) : 6th place (▼); 2010 (Division Five) : 5th place (▼); 2011 (Division Six) : 4th place; 2013 (Division Six) : Winners (▲); 2014 (Division Five) : Winners (▲); 2014 (Division Four) : 6th place (▼); 2016 (Division Five) : Winners (▲); 2016 (Division Four) : 5th place (▼); 2017 (Division Five) : Winners (▲); 2018 (Division Four) : 4th place

=== Other regional tournaments ===
T20WC Europe Regional Final (T20I)	T20WC Europe Sub-regional Qualifiers (T20I)	European T20 C'ship Division One (T20)	European Cricket Championship
2019 : Winners (Q); 2021 : Winners (Q); 2023 : 4th place (DNQ); 2025 : 3rd place (DNQ); 2027 : Qualified	2018: Runners-up (Q); 2022: Received a bye; 2024: Winners (Q); 2026: Winners (Q)	2011: Semi-finals; 2013: Semi-finals; 2015: Winners	1996 to 2004 inclusive: Not eligible, not an ICC member; 2006: Division Two Runner-up; 2008: Division Two Winner – promoted; 2010: Division One Winner; 2011: Division One Third place; 2013: Division One Semi-Finals; 2015: Division One Winner

== Records and statistics ==
International Match Summary — Jersey

Last updated 23 May 2026

Playing Record
Format	M	W	L	T	NR	Inaugural Match
One-Day Internationals	5	1	4	0	0	27 March 2023
Twenty20 Internationals	61	42	18	1	0	31 May 2019

=== One Day International ===
- Highest team total: 291/4 v Papua New Guinea on 1 April 2023 at United Ground, Windhoek.
- Highest individual score: 115*, Asa Tribe v Papua New Guinea on 1 April 2023 at United Ground, Windhoek.
- Best individual bowling figures: 4/39, Benjamin Ward v United States on 4 April 2023 at United Ground, Windhoek.

Most ODI runs for Jersey

Player	Runs	Average	Career span
Josh Lawrenson	243	48.60	2023
Asa Tribe	237	59.25	2023
Harrison Carlyon	143	28.60	2023
Jonty Jenner	139	27.80	2023
Julius Sumerauer	97	24.25	2023

Most ODI wickets for Jersey

Player	Wickets	Average	Career span
Julius Sumerauer	11	22.27	2023
Charles Perchard	9	23.11	2023
Benjamin Ward	6	36.83	2023
Elliot Miles	4	41.25	2023
Harrison Carlyon	2	70.50	2023

ODI record versus other nations

Records complete to ODI #4566. Last updated 5 April 2023.

Opponent	M	W	L	T	NR	First match	First win
vs Associate Members
Canada	1	0	1	0	0	27 March 2023	
Namibia	1	0	1	0	0	30 March 2023	
Papua New Guinea	1	1	0	0	0	1 April 2023	1 April 2023
United Arab Emirates	1	0	1	0	0	5 April 2023	
United States	1	0	1	0	0	4 April 2023	

=== Twenty20 International ===
- Highest team total: 280/3 v Croatia on 20 May 2026 at Happy Valley Ground, Episkopi.
- Highest individual score: 110, Harrison Carlyon v Serbia on 7 July 2024 at Bayer Uerdingen Cricket Ground, Krefeld.
- Best individual bowling figures: 5/17, Charles Perchard v Guernsey on 1 June 2019 at King George V Sports Ground, Castel.

Most T20I runs for Jersey

Player	Runs	Average	Career span
Jonty Jenner	1,541	32.10	2019–2026
Nick Greenwood	1,115	29.34	2019–2026
Harrison Carlyon	1,089	23.17	2019–2026
Benjamin Ward	644	25.76	2019–2026
Asa Tribe	564	25.63	2021–2025

Most T20I wickets for Jersey

Player	Wickets	Average	Career span
Charles Perchard	87	13.78	2019–2026
Benjamin Ward	66	14.75	2019–2026
Dominic Blampied	49	19.46	2019–2026
Julius Sumerauer	49	22.04	2019–2026
Elliot Miles	40	17.39	2019–2023

T20I record versus other nations

Records complete to T20I #3903. Last updated 23 May 2026.

Opponent	M	W	L	T	NR	First match	First win
v. Full members
Ireland	2	0	2	0	0	25 October 2019	
Zimbabwe	1	0	1	0	0	12 July 2022	
vs Associate Members
Austria	1	1	0	0	0	20 July 2023	20 July 2023
Belgium	1	1	0	0	0	10 July 2024	10 July 2024
Canada	1	0	1	0	0	20 October 2019	
Croatia	1	1	0	0	0	20 May 2026	20 May 2026
Denmark	6	6	0	0	0	16 June 2019	16 June 2019
France	1	1	0	0	0	19 May 2026	19 May 2026
Germany	4	3	1	0	0	20 June 2019	15 October 2021
Guernsey	17	14	2	1	0	31 May 2019	1 June 2019
Hong Kong	1	0	1	0	0	23 October 2019	
Italy	4	3	1	0	0	19 June 2019	19 June 2019
Netherlands	1	0	1	0	0	5 July 2025	
Nigeria	1	1	0	0	0	19 October 2019	19 October 2019
Norway	2	2	0	0	0	16 June 2019	16 June 2019
Oman	1	1	0	0	0	27 October 2019	27 October 2019
Qatar	3	0	3	0	0	9 October 2019	
Scotland	2	1	1	0	0	21 July 2023	11 July 2025
Serbia	1	1	0	0	0	7 July 2024	7 July 2024
Singapore	2	2	0	0	0	14 July 2022	14 July 2022
Spain	2	0	2	0	0	14 April 2024	
Switzerland	2	2	0	0	0	9 July 2024	9 July 2024
United Arab Emirates	1	1	0	0	0	22 October 2019	22 October 2019
Uganda	1	0	1	0	0	15 July 2022	
United States	1	0	1	0	0	11 July 2022	

== Current squad ==
Updated as of 5 July 2025.

This lists all the players who were part of the Jersey squad for 2025 Men's T20 World Cup Europe Regional Final. Uncapped players are listed in italics.

Name	Age	Batting style	Bowling style	Last T20I	Notes
Batters
Charlie Brennan	21	Right-handed	Right-arm medium-fast	(Denmark) 2025	
Jonty Jenner	28	Right-handed	Right-arm off break	(Scotland) 2025	
Asa Tribe	22	Right-handed	Right-arm off break	(Netherlands) 2025	
Zak Tribe	25	Right-handed	Leg break googly	(Scotland) 2025	
All-rounder
Charles Perchard	34	Right-handed	Right-arm medium	(Scotland) 2025	Captain
Dominic Blampied	30	Right-handed	Leg break	(Scotland) 2025	
Harrison Carlyon	25	Right-handed	Right-arm off break	(Scotland) 2025	
Nick Greenwood	27	Right-handed	Right-arm off break	(Scotland) 2025	
William Perchard	21	Right-handed	Right-arm medium-fast	(Guernsey) 2025	
Julius Sumerauer	25	Right-handed	Right-arm fast-medium	(Scotland) 2025	
Benjamin Ward	27	Right-handed	Leg break	(Scotland) 2025	
Wicket-keeper
Jake Dunford	32	Right-handed	—N/a	(Scotland) 2025	
Patrick Gouge	23	Right-handed	Leg break googly	(Scotland) 2025	
Pace Bowlers
Theo Pullman	19	Right-handed	Right-arm medium	(Guernsey) 2025	
George Richardson	21	Right-handed	Right-arm medium-fast	(Spain) 2024	

== Notable players ==
Ten players have played for Jersey and at first-class level for another team (or teams):

- Albert Geary – played for Jersey between 1932 and 1940, and earlier for Surrey
- Ryan Driver – played for Jersey between 2005 and 2011, and earlier for Cornwall, Lancashire, and Worcestershire
- Corne Bodenstein – debuted for Jersey in 2011, also played for Oxford MCC University
- Nathaniel Watkins – debuted for Jersey in 2012, also played for Oxfordshire and Durham MCC University
- Jonty Jenner – debuted for Jersey in 2014, also played for Sussex, played as substitute fielder for Stuart Broad during the first Test between England and South Africa.
- Jake Dunford debuted for Jersey in 2016 and also played for Durham MCC University.
- Nick Greenwood debuted for Jersey in 2019 and also played for Wellington.
- Nicholas Ferraby debuted for Jersey in 2019 and also played for Oxford University and Oxford MCC University.
- William Robertson debuted for Jersey in 2019 and also played for Oxford MCC University.
- Asa Tribe debuted for Jersey in 2021 and also played for Glamorgan.

Several other first-class players were born on the island, including:

- Arthur Coode – first-class matches for Cambridge University, Middlesex, and the MCC
- Robert Copland-Crawford – first-class matches for the MCC and North of England, football for Scotland
- Herbert Lyon – first-class matches for Oxford University
- Robert Osborne-Smith – one first-class match for the Indian Army

== See also ==
- Jersey Cricket Board
- List of Jersey cricketers
- List of Jersey ODI cricketers
- List of Jersey Twenty20 International cricketers
