= 2011 Europe Twenty20 Division One =

2011 ICC European T20 Championship Division One
- Administrator: International Cricket Council
- Cricket format: 20-over
- Tournament format: Round-robin
- Host(s): Jersey; Guernsey
- Champions: Denmark
- Participants: 12
- Matches: 42
- Most runs: (Denmark) Frederik Klokker (238)
- Most wickets: (Denmark) Bashir Shah (15) (France) Zika Ali (15)
- Official website: ICC European Championship

The 2011 ICC European Twenty20 Championship Division One was a cricket tournament that took place between 19 and 24 July 2011. It forms part of the European Cricket Championship. Jersey and the Guernsey hosted the event.

== Teams ==
Teams that qualified are as follows:

=== Group A ===
- Italy
- Guernsey
- Norway
- Gibraltar
- Croatia
- Austria

=== Group B ===
- Denmark
- Jersey
- Germany
- France
- Israel
- Belgium

== Squads ==
Austria	Belgium	Croatia	Denmark
Amar Naeem (c) & (wk); Aman Deep; Imran Asif; Erwin Grasinger; Lakmal Kasturiarachchige; Satish Kaul; Benjamin Loader; Munir Ahmed; Tiran Perera; Nitin Sharma; Simpson-Parker; Nandeep Soggi; Satyam Subhash; Syed Qamar	Andre Wagener (c); Robert Sehmi; Jamie Farmiloe; Aamir Iqbal; Javed Iqbal; Faisal Khaliq; Shaival Mehta; Shahid Muhammad; Simon Newport; Ali Raza (wk); Abdul Rehman; W Shafiq; Nirvam Shah; Shaheryar Butt; Sunny Sheikh	John Vujnovich (c); Jasen Butkovic; Nikola Davidovic; Anthony Govorko; Jeffrey Grzanic; Michael Grzinic; Pero Kastelan; David Lambasa; Paul Musin; Christopher Pivac; Craig Sinovich; Vivek Sharma; Paul Vujnovich; Craig Wear	Michael Pedersen (c); Aftab Ahmed; Sair Anjum; Bobby Chawla; Hamid Shah; Basit Raja; Kamran Mahmood; Freddie Klokker (wk); Jacob Larsen; Martin Pedersen; Rizwan Mahmood; Kasper Rubin; Syed Shah; Shehzad Ahmed

France	Germany	Gibraltar	Guernsey
Waseem Bhatti (c) & (wk); Zika Ali; Arun Ayyavooraju; Rameez Ehsan; Hugo Pinsent; Thomas Liddiard; Avishka Liyanaarachchi; Robin Murphy; Adnan Musharif; Abdul Rehman Qureshi; Shahid Arfan; Williamdeep Singh; Ramesh Sithambaranathan; Usman Khan	Asif Khan (c); Ayoma Abeywickrama; Benjamin Das; Ehsan Latif; Milano Fernando; Shakeel Hassan; Imran Chaudhry; Rana-Javed Iqbal; Kashif Haider; Kashif Mahmood; Mudassar Razzaq; Dilshan Rajudeen; Fazal Rathore; Syed Shah	Iain Latin; Charles Avellano; Mark Bacarese; Aaron Bagiletto; David Coram; Charles L Cruz; Ian Farrell; Kieron Ferrary; Ross Harkins; Matthew Hunter; Karl Sene; Jack Lutman; Andrew Reyes; Kayron Stagno	Stuart Le Provost (c); Stuart Bisson; Timothy Duke; Jeremy Frith; David Hooper; Tom Kimber (wk); Ross Kneller; Adam Martel; Kris Moherndl; Jamie Nussbaumer; Tim Ravenscroft; Gary Rich; Lee Savident; GH Smit

Israel	Italy	Jersey	Norway
Herschel Gutman (c); Shailesh Bangera; Nir Dokarker; Josh Evans; Danny Hotz; Daniel Hyman; Itamar Kehimkar; David Massil; Yefet Nagavakar; Yaniv Razpurker; Eliezar Samson; Eshkol Solomon; Raymond Talkar; Shifron Waskar	Alessandro Bonora (c); Alauddin; Apputhamilage; Dilan Fernando; Damian Crowley; Luis di Giglio; Damian Fernando; Hemantha Jayasena; Gayashan Munasinghe; Andy Northcote; Hayden Patrizi; Peter Petricola; Michael Raso; Sivalingaperumal	Peter Gough (c); Tony Carlyon; Paul Connolly; Samuel de la Haye; Ryan Driver; Edward Farley; Anthony Hawkins-Kay; Chris Jones; Dean Morrison; Alex Noel; Charles Perchard; Benjamin Silva; Ben Stevens; Bradley Vautier	Zeeshan Ali (c); Aamer Waheed; Adeel Ibrar; Babar Shahzad; Iftikhar Hussain; Moosa Rashid; Faisal Qureshi; Mofassar Saeed; Safir Hayat; Ali Saleem; Muhammad Butt; Waqas Ahmed; Waseem Gill; Zaheer Ashiq

== Fixtures ==
=== Group stage ===
==== Group A ====
Team	P	W	L	T	NR	Points	NRR
Italy	5	4	1	0	0	8	+1.816
Guernsey	5	4	1	0	0	8	+1.492
Austria	5	3	2	0	0	6	-0.196
Norway	5	3	2	0	0	6	-0.584
Gibraltar	5	1	4	0	0	2	-1.649
Croatia	5	0	5	0	0	0	-0.982

19 July
11.00 a.m.
Scorecard

Austria; 141 (19.1 overs)	v	Gibraltar; 135/8 (20 overs)
Imran Asif 35 (22); Aaron Baglietto 3/12 (3.1 overs)		Mark Bacarese 66* (60); Lakmal Kasturiarachchige 2/24 (4 overs)

Austria won by 6 runs
Guernsey Rovers Athletic Club Ground, Port Soif
Umpires: Trevor Magee (Ireland) and Brian Papworth (Scotland)

- Gibraltar won the toss and elected to field.

19 July
11.00 a.m.
Scorecard

Croatia; 89/6 (20 overs)	v	Italy; 93/9 (16.3 overs)
Paul Vujnovich 28 (40); Andy Northcote 2/19 (4 overs)		Damian Crowley 26* (33); Vivek Sharma 3/18 (4 overs)

Italy won by 1 wicket
College Field, St Peter Port
Umpires: Martin Gray (Guernsey) and David Kenworthy (Isle of Man)

- Croatia won the toss and elected to bat.

19 July
11.00 a.m.
Scorecard

Guernsey; 60/0 (7.1 overs)	v	Norway; 57 (17.2 overs)
Tim Ravenscroft 31* (21)		Aamer Waheed 11* (20); Jamie Nussbaumer 3/7 (3.2 overs)

Guernsey won by 10 wickets.
King George V Sports Ground, Castel
Umpires: Alex Dowdalls (Scotland) and Keith Smith (Ireland)

- Guernsey won the toss and elected to field.

19 July
4.00 p.m.
Scorecard

Austria; 105 (18.4 overs)	v	Italy; 107/3 (18.1 overs)
Amar Naeem 23 (27); Peter Petricola 4/20 (3.4 overs)		Peter Petricola 28* (29); Munir Ahmed 2/14 (4 overs)

Italy won by 7 wickets.
King George V Sports Ground, Castel
Umpires: Alex Dowdalls (Scotland) and Martin Gray (Guernsey)

- Austria won the toss and elected to bat.

19 July
4.00 p.m.
Scorecard

Gibraltar; 77/8 (20.0 overs)	v	Norway; 78/2 (9.4 overs)
Ian Farrell 15 (24); Muhammad Butt 3/13 (4 overs)		Zaheer Ashiq 35 (20); Andrew Reyes 1/26 (3 overs)

Norway won by 8 wickets.
Guernsey Rovers Athletic Club Ground, Port Soif
Umpires: David Kenworthy (Isle of Man) and Brian Papworth (Scotland)

- Gibraltar won the toss and elected to bat.

19 July
4.00 p.m.
Scorecard

Guernsey; 98/7 (19.0 overs)	v	Croatia; 97/7 (20.0 overs)
Stuart Le Prevost 34 (45); Jeffrey Grzinic 2/14(4 overs)		Paul Vujnovich 25 (25); Tim Ravenscroft 2/20 (4 overs)

Guernsey won by 3 wickets.
College Field, St Peter Port
Umpires: Trevor Magee (Ireland) and Keith Smith (Ireland)

- Guernsey won the toss and elected to field.

21 July
11.00 a.m.
Scorecard

Croatia; 105/4 (20 overs)	v	Norway; 106/3 (19.1 overs)
Paul Vujnovich 48 (45); Muhammad Butt 1/14 (4 overs)		Iftikhar Hussain 56* (39); John Vujnovich 2/16 (4 overs)

Norway won by 7 wickets
Guernsey Rovers Athletic Club Ground, Port Soif
Umpires: David Kenworthy (Isle of Man) and Keith Smith (Ireland)

- Norway won the toss and elected to field.
- Match replayed from 20 July.

21 July
11.00 a.m.
Scorecard

Gibraltar; 81/8 (20 overs)	v	Italy; 82/2 (9.4 overs)
Iain Latin 20 (16); Andy Northcote 4/14 (4 overs)		Andy Northcote 37* (38); Kayron Stagno 1/10 (2.4 overs)

Italy won by 8 wickets
College Field, St Peter Port
Umpires: Alex Dowdalls (Scotland) and Trevor Magee (Ireland)

- Gibraltar won the toss and elected to bat.
- Match replayed from 20 July.

21 July
11.00 a.m.
Scorecard

Guernsey; 122/6 (20 overs)	v	Austria; 130/9 (20 overs)
Jeremy Frith 39 (42); Lakmal Kasturiarachchige 2/17 (4 overs)		Aman Deep 40 (30); Tim Ravenscroft 3/25 (4 overs)

Austria won by 8 runs
King George V Sports Ground, Castel
Umpires: Martin Gray (Guernsey) and Brian Papworth (Scotland)

- Guernsey won the toss and elected to field.
- Match replayed from 20 July.

21 July
4.00 p.m.
Scorecard

Austria; 64 (16.3 overs)	v	Norway; 65/1 (9 overs)
Lakmal Kasturiarachchige 13 (12); Shahid Ahmed 2/6 (4 overs)		Zeeshan Ali 21* (15)

Norway won by 9 wickets
College Field, St Peter Port
Umpires: Alex Dowdalls (Scotland) and Keith Smith (Ireland)

- Austria won the toss and elected to bat.
- Match replayed from 20 July.

21 July
4.00 p.m.
Scorecard

Croatia; 120/5 (20 overs)	v	Gibraltar; 121/3 (19 overs)
Paul Vujnovich 34 (44); Ross Harkins 2/17 (4 overs)		David Coram 36 (36); Vivek Sharma 2/17 (4 overs)

Gibraltar won by 7 wickets
King George V Sports Ground, Castel
Umpires: David Kenworthy (Isle of Man) and Trevor Magee (Ireland)

- Gibraltar won the toss and elected to field.
- Match replayed from 20 July.

21 July
4.00 p.m.
Scorecard

Guernsey; 188/6 (20 overs)	v	Italy; 150/9 (20 overs)
Tim Ravenscroft 70 (37); Andy Northcote 2/33 (3 overs)		Andy Northcote 53 (42); Tim Ravenscroft 3/22 (3 overs)

Guernsey won by 38 runs
Guernsey Rovers Athletic Club Ground, Port Soif
Umpires: Martin Gray (Guernsey) and Brian Papworth (Scotland)

- Guernsey won the toss and elected to bat.
- Match replayed from 20 July.

22 July
11.00 a.m.
Scorecard

Austria; 176/3 (20 overs)	v	Croatia; 125 (18.5 overs)
Amar Naeem 100* (63); Christopher Pivac 1/14 (4 overs)		Christopher Pivac 64 (46); Lakmal Kasturiarachchige 5/22 (3.5 overs)

Austria won by 51 runs
Guernsey Rovers Athletic Club Ground, Port Soif
Umpires: Alex Dowdalls (Scotland) and Trevor Magee (Ireland)

- Croatia won the toss and elected to field.

22 July
11.00 a.m.
Scorecard

Guernsey; 117/4 (17.3 overs)	v	Gibraltar; 116/8 (20 overs)
Jeremy Frith 44* (43); Mark Bacarese 2/15 (4 overs)		David Coram 36 (37); Gary Rich 2/15 (3 overs)

Guernsey won by 6 wickets
College Field, St Peter Port
Umpires: David Kenworthy (Isle of Man) and Brian Papworth (Scotland)

- Gibraltar won the toss and elected to bat.

22 July
11.00 a.m.
Scorecard

Italy; 185/2 (20 overs)	v	Norway; 87 (17.2 overs)
Damian Crowley 77* (59); Waheed Aamir 1/33 (4 overs)		Adeel Ibrar 33 (44); Gayashan Munasinghe 2/6 (2.2 overs)

Italy won by 98 runs
King George V Sports Ground, Castel
Umpires: Martin Gray (Guernsey) and Keith Smith (Ireland)

- Norway won the toss and elected to field.

==== Group B ====
Team	P	W	L	T	NR	Points	NRR
Denmark	5	4	1	0	0	8	+2.523
Jersey	5	4	1	0	0	8	+1.195
Belgium	5	3	2	0	0	6	-0.456
France	5	2	3	0	0	4	-0.036
Germany	5	2	3	0	0	4	-1.287
Israel	5	0	5	0	0	0	-1.610

19 July
11.00 a.m.
Scorecard

Belgium; 115/5 (19.4 overs)	v	France; 114 (20 overs)
Nirvam Shah 33 (34); Usman Khan 3/30 (4 overs)		Abdul Rehman 29 (27); Faisal Khaliq 3/27 (4 overs)

Belgium won by 5 wickets.
FB Fields, St Clement
Umpires: Mark Hawthorne (Ireland) and Charlie McElwee (Ireland)

- France won the toss and elected to bat.

19 July
11.00 a.m.
Scorecard

Jersey; 100/4 (16.1 overs)	v	Germany; 99/7 (20.0 overs)
Ryan Driver 21 (26); Syed Shah 2/19 (3 overs)		Imran Chaudhry 36 (25); Anthony Hawkins-Kay 3/13 (4 overs)

Jersey won by 6 wickets.
Les Quennevais, St Brelade
Umpires: Niels Bagh (Denmark) and Louis Fourie (Ireland)

- Jersey won the toss and elected to field.

19 July
11.00 a.m.
Scorecard

Denmark; 96/2 (15.0 overs)	v	Israel; 94/9 (20.0 overs)
Frederik Klokker 44* (43); Herschel Gutman 1/5 (2 overs)		Yaniv Razpurker 26 (23); Bashir Shah 2/11 (4 overs)

Denmark won by 8 wickets.
Farmers Cricket Club Ground, St Martin
Umpires: Ian Ramage (Scotland) and Richard Smith (Ireland)

- Denmark won the toss and elected to field.

19 July
4.00 p.m.
Scorecard

Belgium; 104 (19.1 overs)	v	Denmark; 103 (19.4 overs)
Nirvam Shah 24 (27); Bobby Chawla 3/13 (2.1 overs)		Bashir Shah 20 (24); Waqas Shafiq 3/18 (4 overs)

Belgium won by 1 run.
FB Fields, St Clement
Umpires: Bart Hartong (Netherlands) and Charlie McElwee (Ireland)

- Belgium won the toss and elected to bat.

19 July
4.00 p.m.
Scorecard

France; 126/7 (20 overs)	v	Germany; 92 (18.3 overs)
Usman Khan 36 (28); Syed Shah 2/12 (4 overs)		Mudassar Razzaq 27 (29); Zika Ali 3/17 (4 overs)

France won by 34 runs.
Les Quennevais, St Brelade
Umpires: Niels Bagh (Denmark) and Louis Fourie (Ireland)

- Germany won the toss and elected to field.

19 July
4.00 p.m.
Scorecard

Jersey; 90/2 (12 overs)	v	Israel; 87 (20 overs)
Dean Morrison 64* (44); Eliezar Samson 1/16 (3 overs)		Danny Hotz 19 (20); Tony Carlyon 4/9 (4 overs)

Jersey won by 8 wickets.
Farmers Cricket Club Ground, St Martin
Umpires: Alan Neill (Ireland) and Richard Smith (Ireland)

- Jersey won the toss and elected to field.

21 July
11.00 a.m.
Scorecard

Denmark; 40/2 (6.5 overs)	v	France; 39/8 (14 overs)
Frederik Klokker 12* (14); Zika Ali 2/7 (1 over)		Adnan Musharif 24 (29); Bobby Chawla 4/15 (3 overs)

Denmark won by 8 wickets
Grainville, St Saviour
Umpires: Charlie McElwee (Ireland) and Alan Neill (Ireland)

- France won the toss and elected to bat.
- Match replayed from 20 July.
- Match reduced to 14 overs a side due to rain.

21 July
11.00 a.m.
Scorecard

Germany; 140/3 (16.5 overs)	v	Israel; 138/6 (20 overs)
Imran Chaudhry 60* (35); Eliezar Samson 3/33 (4 overs)		Daniel Hyman 51 (57); Kashif Haider 2/16 (4 overs)

Germany won by 7 wickets
FB Fields, St Clement
Umpires: Mark Hawthorne (Ireland) and Ian Ramage (Scotland)

- Israel won the toss and elected to bat.
- Match replayed from 20 July.

21 July
11.00 a.m.
Scorecard

Jersey; 89/2 (11.2 overs)	v	Belgium; 85 (18.5 overs)
Edward Farley 36* (26); Faisal Khaliq 1/6 (2 overs)		Ali Raza 17 (7); Anthony Hawkins-Kay 3/19 (3.5 overs)

Jersey won by 8 wickets
Farmers Cricket Club Ground, St Martin
Umpires: Bart Hartong (Netherlands) and Louis Fourie (Ireland)

- Belgium won the toss and elected to bat.
- Match replayed from 20 July.

21 July
4.00 p.m.
Scorecard

Belgium; 139 (19.4 overs)	v	Germany; 144/8 (20 overs)
Shaival Mehta 31 (24); Syed Shah 3/19 (4 overs)		Dilshan Rajudeen 58 (47); Faisal Khaliq 3/22 (4 overs)

Germany won by 5 runs
FB Fields, St Clement
Umpires: Mark Hawthorne (Ireland) and Ian Ramage (Scotland)

- Germany won the toss and elected to bat.
- Match replayed from 20 July.

21 July
4.00 p.m.
Scorecard

France; 112 (20 overs)	v	Israel; 80 (19.2 overs)
Abdul Rehman 35 (28); David Massil 3/11 (4 overs)		Herschel Gutman 14 (22); Zika Ali 4/18 (4 overs)

France won by 32 runs
Grainville, St Saviour
Umpires: Niels Bagh (Denmark) and Alan Neill (Ireland)

- Israel won the toss and elected to field.
- Match replayed from 20 July.

21 July
4.00 p.m.
Scorecard

Jersey; 110/9 (20 overs)	v	Denmark; 168/3 (20 overs)
Frederik Klokker 57 (49); Ryan Driver 1/19 (4 overs)		Ben Stevens 27* (18); Bobby Chawla 3/10 (4 overs)

Denmark won by 58 runs
Farmers Cricket Club Ground, St Martin
Umpires: Bart Hartong (Netherlands) and Richard Smith (Ireland)

- Jersey won the toss and elected to field.
- Match replayed from 20 July.

22 July
11.00 a.m.
Scorecard

Belgium; 107/5 (18 overs)	v	Israel; 106 (19.3 overs)
Simon Newport 28* (28); Josh Evans 3/14 (4 overs)		Danny Hotz 40 (45); W Shafiq 2/7 (4 overs)

Belgium won by 5 wickets
Les Quennevais, St Brelade
Umpires: Bart Hartong (Netherlands) and Alan Neill (Ireland)

- Belgium won the toss and elected to field.

22 July
11.00 a.m.
Scorecard

Denmark; 166/1 (20 overs)	v	Germany; 74 (16.1 overs)
Frederik Klokker 91* (62); Kashif Haider 1/17 (4 overs)		Milano Fernando 28 (21); Bashir Shah 4/8 (4 overs)

Denmark won by 92 runs
Farmers Cricket Club Ground, St Martin
Umpires: Louis Fourie (Ireland) and Charlie McElwee (Ireland)

- Denmark won the toss and elected to bat.

22 July
11.00 a.m.
Scorecard

Jersey; 99/2 (14.5 overs)	v	France; 98/7 (20 overs)
Edward Farley 57* (42); Abdul Rehman 1/18 (3 overs)		Ramesh Sithambaranthan 25 (25); Ben Stevens 2/12 (4 overs)

Jersey won by 8 wickets
FB Fields, St Clement
Umpires: Niels Bagh (Denmark) and Richard Smith (Ireland)

- France won the toss and elected to bat.

=== Play-offs ===
==== 5th-place play-off semi-final ====
23 July
11.00 a.m.
Scorecard

Austria; 108/9 (20 overs)	v	France; 113/6 (20 overs)
Aman Deep 25 (34); Zika Ali 4/12 (4 overs)		Arun Ayyavooraju 48 (48); Imran Asif 2/15 (3 overs)

France won by 5 runs
Grainville, St Saviour
Umpires: Alex Dowdalls (Scotland) and Bart Hartong (Netherlands)

- Austria won the toss and elected to field.

==== 5th-place play-off semi-final ====
23 July
11.00 a.m.
Scorecard

Belgium; 119/8 (20 overs)	v	Norway; 122/7 (19.2 overs)
Ali Raza 31 (25); Mofassar Saeed 2/16 (4 overs)		Iftikhar Hussain 31* (26); W Shafiq 2/10 (4 overs)

Norway won by 3 wickets
Les Quennevais, St Brelade
Umpires: Louis Fourie (Ireland) and Brian Papworth (Scotland)

- Norway won the toss and elected to field.

==== 9th-place play-off semi-final ====
23 July
11.00 a.m.
Scorecard

Croatia; 132/8 (20 overs)	v	Germany; 222/7 (20 overs)
Nikola Davidovic 47 (30); Rana-Javed Iqbal 2/13 (4 overs)		Asif Khan 56 (25); Craig Wear 2/32 (2 overs)

Germany won by 90 runs
Victoria College Ground, St Helier
Umpires: Trevor Magee (Ireland) and Alan Neill (Ireland)

- Croatia won the toss and elected to field.

==== 9th-place play-off semi-final ====
23 July
11.00 a.m.
Scorecard

Gibraltar; 110 (19.2 overs)	v	Israel; 67 (18.1 overs)
David Coram 32 (34); Herschel Gutman 3/15 (3.2 overs)		Itamar Kehimkar 18 (22); Ross Harkins 3/6 (3 overs)

Gibraltar won by 43 runs
Les Quennevais, St Brelade
Umpires: Martin Gray (Guernsey) and Charlie McElwee (Ireland)

- Israel won the toss and elected to field.

==== Semi-final ====
23 July
11.00 a.m.
Scorecard

Denmark; 136/4 (20 overs)	v	Guernsey; 78 (18.2 overs)
Shehzad Ahmed 40 (39); Jeremy Frith 2/17 (4 overs)		Tim Ravenscroft 24 (15); Bashir Shah 4/23 (3.2 overs)

Denmark won by 58 runs
FB Fields, St Clement
Umpires: Ian Ramage (Scotland) and Richard Smith (Ireland)

- Denmark won the toss and elected to bat.

==== Semi-final ====
23 July
11.00 a.m.
Scorecard

Jersey; 119/9 (20 overs)	v	Italy; 133/8 (20 overs)
Peter Gough 31 (31); Damian Crowley 2/10 (2 overs)		Damian Crowley 55 (44); Ben Stevens 2/19 (4 overs)

Italy won by 14 runs
Farmers Cricket Club Ground, St Martin
Umpires: Niels Bagh (Denmark) and Mark Hawthorne (Ireland)

- Italy won the toss and elected to bat.

==== 11th-place play-off ====
24 July
11.00 a.m.
Scorecard

Croatia; 86 (17 overs)	v	Israel; 172/7 (20 overs)
Christopher Pivac 27 (26); Eliezar Samson 4/7 (4 overs)		Herschel Gutman 51 (37); Christopher Pivac 2/16 (2 overs)

Israel won by 86 runs
Les Quennevais, St Brelade
Umpires: Bart Hartong (Netherlands) and David Kenworthy (Isle of Man)

- Israel won the toss and elected to bat.

==== 3rd-place play-off ====
24 July
11.00 a.m.
Scorecard

Jersey; 162/2 (17.2 overs)	v	Guernsey; 158/8 (20 overs)
Edward Farley 90 (48); Adam Martel 1/7 (1.2 overs)		Ross Kneller 37 (32); Ben Stevens 4/14 (4 overs)

Jersey won by 8 wickets
Grainville, St Saviour
Umpires: Niels Bagh (Denmark) and Richard Smith (Ireland)
Player of the match: Edward Farley (Jer)

- Guernsey won the toss and elected to bat.

==== 5th-place play-off ====
24 July
11.00 a.m.
Scorecard

France; 70 (16.3 overs)	v	Norway; 71/4 (16.5 overs)
Waseem Bhatti 20 (24); Zaheer Ashiq 4/2 (1.3 overs)		Zeeshan Ali 33* (40); Williamdeep Singh 2/15 (4 overs)

Norway won by 6 wickets
Farmers Cricket Club Ground, St Martin
Umpires: Martin Gray (Guernsey) and Alan Neill (Ireland)

- Norway won the toss and elected to field.

==== 7th-place play-off ====
24 July
11.00 a.m.
Scorecard

Austria; 114 (19.3 overs)	v	Belgium; 125/8 (20 overs)
Imran Asif 49 (45); Faisal Khaliq 3/18 (3.3 overs)		Jamie Farmiloe 50 (43); Wasif Saluja 2/20 (3 overs)

Belgium won by 11 runs
FB Fields, St Clement
Umpires: Charlie McElwee (Ireland) and Keith Smith (Ireland)

- Austria won the toss and elected to field.

==== 9th-place play-off ====
24 July
11.00 a.m.
Scorecard

Germany; 134 (18 overs)	v	Gibraltar; 157/7 (20 overs)
Kashif Haider 23 (20); Matthew Hunter 2/22 (3 overs)		Ross Harkins 33 (19); Mian Latif 2/19 (3 overs)

Gibraltar won by 23 runs
Victoria College Ground, St Helier
Umpires: Alex Dowdalls (Scotland) and Louis Fourie (Ireland)

- Gibraltar won the toss and elected to bat.

==== Final ====
24 July
2.30 a.m.
Scorecard

Denmark; 84/4 (18.1 overs)	v	Italy; 83 (17.2 overs)
Rizwan Mahmood 31* (47); Dilan Fernando 2/15 (4 overs)		Andy Northcote 38 (37); Bashir Shah 3/14 (3.2 overs)

Denmark won by 6 wickets
Grainville, St Saviour
Umpires: Mark Hawthorne (Ireland) and Ian Ramage (Scotland)
Player of the match: Rizwan Mahmood (Den)

- Italy won the toss and elected to bat.

== Final Placings ==
Pos	Team	Promotion/relegation
1st	Denmark	Promoted to 2012 ICC World Twenty20 Qualifier
2nd	Italy	Promoted to 2012 ICC World Twenty20 Qualifier
3rd	Jersey	Remain in 2013 ICC European T20 Championship Division One
4th	Guernsey	Remain in 2013 ICC European T20 Championship Division One
5th	Norway	Remain in 2013 ICC European T20 Championship Division One
6th	France	Remain in 2013 ICC European T20 Championship Division One
7th	Belgium	Remain in 2013 ICC European T20 Championship Division One
8th	Austria	Remain in 2013 ICC European T20 Championship Division One
9th	Gibraltar	Remain in 2013 ICC European T20 Championship Division One
10th	Germany	Remain in 2013 ICC European T20 Championship Division One
11th	Israel	Relegated to 2013 European T20 Championship Division Two
12th	Croatia	Relegated to 2013 European T20 Championship Division Two

== Statistics ==
=== Most runs ===
The top five highest run scorers (total runs) are included in this table.

Player	Team	Runs	Inns	Avg	S/R	HS	100s	50s	4s	6s
Frederik Klokker	Denmark	238	7	59.50	117.24	91*	0	2	23	4
Edward Farley	Jersey	231	7	46.20	141.71	90	0	2	20	12
Damian Crowley	Italy	216	6	72.00	107.46	77*	0	2	19	4
Andy Northcote	Italy	205	7	34.16	107.32	53	0	1	15	3
Christopher Pivac	Croatia	204	8	29.14	111.47	64	0	1	29	4

=== Most wickets ===
The following table contains the five leading wicket-takers.

Player	Team	Wkts	Mts	Ave	S/R	Econ	BBI
Bashir Shah	Denmark	15	7	7.00	10.2	4.09	4/8
Zika Ali	France	15	7	7.66	9.1	5.03	4/12
Bobby Chawla	Denmark	14	7	7.50	9.1	4.92	4/15
Faisal Khaliq	Belgium	14	7	9.42	9.7	5.82	3/18
Anthony Hawkins-Kay	Jersey	14	7	12.35	11.9	6.21	3/13

== See also ==
- 2012 ICC World Twenty20 Qualifier
- European Cricket Championship
