= 2009 ICC World Cricket League Division Six =

2009 ICC WCL Division 6
- Administrator: International Cricket Council
- Cricket format: One day cricket
- Tournament format(s): Round-robin and Knockout
- Host: Singapore
- Champions: Singapore
- Participants: 6
- Matches: 18
- Most runs: Jeremy Frith (Ggy)
- Most wickets: Mulewa Dharmichand (Sin)

The 2009 ICC World Cricket League Division Six was a cricket tournament held from 29 August to 5 September 2009 in Singapore. The tournament was the second stage of the qualification structure for the 2015 World Cup as well as part of the wider ICC World Cricket League. The two leading teams of the tournament were promoted to Division Five in 2010.

== Teams ==
- Bahrain (qualified through 2009 Global Division Seven)
- Botswana (relegated from 2008 Global Division Five)
- Guernsey (qualified through 2009 Global Division Seven)
- Malaysia (qualified through 2008 ACC Trophy Elite)
- Norway (relegated from 2008 Global Division Five)
- Singapore (relegated from 2008 Global Division Five)

== Squads ==
Bahrain	Botswana	Guernsey	Malaysia	Norway	Singapore
Yaser Sadeq; Fahad Sadeq; Azeem Ul Haq; Adil Hanif; Zafar Zaheer; Ashraf Yaqoob; Imran Sajjad; Shahzad Ahmed; Tahir Dar; Qamar Saeed; Vivek Subramaniam; Halal Abbasi; Naeem Amin; Asghar Abdul Majeed	Omar Ali; Tshepo Mhozya; Karabo Modise; Mosa Gaolekwe; Faisal Rana Rasheed; Gaolape Mokokwe; Denzil Sequeira; Karan Kapoor; Abdul Patel; Indika Perera; James Moses; Shah Zaib Khan; Taroesh Trivedi; Noor Ahmad; Vanesh Seganathirajah	Stuart Le Prevost; Lee Savident; Stuart Bisson; James Warr; Tom Kimber; Gary Rich; Kris Moherndl; Blane Queripel; James Nussbaumer; Lee Ferbrache; Ross Kneller; GH Smit; Jeremy Frith; Jonathan Warr	Suhan Kumar; Ahmad Faiz; Suresh Navaratnam; Rakesh Madhavan; Muthuraman Sockalingam; Shafiq Sharif; Faris Almas; Aminudin Ramly; Manrick Singh; Damith Warusavithana; Hassan Ghulam Muhammad; Thusara Kodikara; Mohammad Shukri; Nik Azril Arifin	Zaheer Ashiq; Munawar Ahmed; Zeeshan Ali; Aziz Ataul; Mubasshar Bhatti; Shabbas Butt; Zeshan Ahmed Rauf; Shahid Ahmad; Safir Hayat; Umran Shahzad; Aamir Waheed; Iram Dawood; Adeel Ibrar; Iftakhar Hussain	Chetan Suryawanshi; Narender Reddy; Monish Arora; Rohan Tripathi; Chaminda Ruwan; Buddhika Mendis; Christopher Janik; Anish Param; Shoaib Razzak; Mirzan Omar; Mulewa Dharmichand; Vivek Vedagiri; Saad Janjua; Pramodh Raja; Sri Ranga Singaraja

Umpire	Country
Simon Taufel	Australia
Kevin Bishop	Hong Kong
Riaz Chaudary	Kuwait
Buddhi Pradaan	Nepal
Sanjay Gurung	Nepal
Vinay Kumar Jha	Nepal
Sarika Prasad	Singapore
Grant Johnston	Vanuatu

== Group stage ==
Pos	Team	Pld	W	L	T	NR	Pts	NRR	Promotion or relegation
1	Singapore	5	5	0	0	0	10	1.045	Met in the final and promoted to Division Five for 2010
2	Bahrain	5	3	2	0	0	6	0.909	Met in the final and promoted to Division Five for 2010
3	Malaysia	5	3	2	0	0	6	0.467	Met in the third place playoff and remained in Division Six for 2011
4	Guernsey	5	2	3	0	0	4	−0.326	Met in the third place playoff and remained in Division Six for 2011
5	Botswana	5	1	4	0	0	2	−0.250	Met in the 5th place playoff and relegated to Division Seven for 2011
6	Norway	5	1	4	0	0	2	−1.746	Met in the 5th place playoff and relegated to Division Seven for 2011

=== Fixtures ===
29 August
Scorecard

Norway; 270/9 (50 overs)	v	Botswana; 251 (48.3 overs)
Zaheer Ashiq 75 (71); James Moses 3/32 (8 overs)		James Moses 101 (103); Aamer Waheed 6/56 (9.3 overs)

Norway won by 19 runs
Kallang, Singapore
Umpires: Sanjay Gurung (Nepal) & Simon Taufel (Australia)
Player of the match: James Moses

- Points Norway 2, Botswana 0

29 August
Scorecard

Guernsey; 169 (49.4 overs)	v	Singapore; 170/3 (32.3 overs)
Tom Kimber 58 (59); Mulewa Dharmichand 6/55 (9.4 overs)		Buddhika Mendis 66 (58); Lee Savident 1/28 (7 overs)

Singapore won by 7 wickets
The Padang, Singapore
Umpires: Grant Johnston (Vanuatu) & V Kumar Jha (Nepal)
Player of the match: Mulewa Dharmichand

- Points: Singapore 2, Guernsey 0

29 August
Scorecard

Bahrain; 237/8 (50 overs)	v	Malaysia; 235/8 (50 overs)
Qamar Saeed 75* (69); Damith Warusavithana 2/29 (6.5 overs)		Ahmed Faiz 62 (93); Halal Abbasi 3/40 (10 overs)

Bahrain won by 2 runs
Indian Association, Singapore
Umpires: Kevin Bishop (Hong Kong) & Riyaz Chaudhry (Kuwait)
Player of the match: Qamar Saeed

- Points: Bahrain 2, Malaysia 0

30 August
(scorecard)

Bahrain	v	Guernsey

Match abandoned without a ball bowled
Kallang, Singapore

- Match abandoned due to rain. Rescheduled for the reserve day on 31 August. Both teams earned 0 points.

30 August
(scorecard)

Malaysia	v	Norway

Match abandoned without a ball bowled
The Padang, Singapore

- Match abandoned due to rain. Rescheduled for the reserve day on 31 August. Both teams earned 0 points.

30 August
(scorecard)

Botswana	v	Singapore

Match abandoned without a ball bowled
Indian Association, Singapore

- Match abandoned due to rain. Rescheduled for the reserve day on 31 August. Both teams earned 0 points.

31 August
(scorecard)

Bahrain; 251/6 (50 overs)	v	Guernsey; 189 (46.5 overs)
Adil Hanif 92 (123); Blane Queripel 2/14 (3 overs)		Jeremy Frith 56 (82); Fahad Sadeq 3/47 (10 overs)

Bahrain won by 62 runs
Kallang, Singapore
Umpires: Riaz Chaudhry (Kuwait) & Simon Taufel (Australia)
Player of the match: Adil Hanif

- Replay of match that was abandoned on 30 August. Guernsey won the toss and chose to field. Points: Bahrain 2, Guernsey 0

31 August
(scorecard)

Norway; 188 (45.3 overs)	v	Malaysia; 189/1 (31.1 overs)
Adeel Ibrar 66 (100); Suresh Navaratnam 3/31 (9 overs)		Rakesh Madhavan 95* (95); Aamer Waheed 1/35 (6 overs)

Malaysia win by 9 wickets
The Padang, Singapore
Umpires: Kevin Bishop (Hong Kong) & Sarika Prasad (Singapore)
Player of the match: Rakesh Madhavan

- Replay of match that was abandoned on 30 August. Malaysia won the toss and chose to field. Points: Malaysia 2, Norway 0

31 August
(scorecard)

Singapore; 245 (50 overs)	v	Botswana; 190 (47.3 overs)
Saad Janjua 51 (29); Taroesh Trivedi 3/31 (10 overs)		Faisal Rana 53 (86); Narender Reddy 3/25 (8.3 overs)

Singapore win by 55 runs
Indian Association, Singapore
Umpires: Sanjay Gurung (Nepal) & Buddhi Pradhan (Nepal)
Player of the match: Saad Janjua

- Replay of match that was abandoned on 30 August. Singapore won the toss and chose to bat. Points: Singapore 2, Botswana 0

1 September
(scorecard)

Botswana; 144/4 (33.1 overs)	v	Malaysia
Faisal Rana 61 (102); Dinesh Sockalingham 3/30 (9.1 overs)

No result
Kallang, Singapore
Umpires: Vinay Kumar Jha (Nepal) & Sarika Prasad (Singapore)

- Match abandoned due to rain. Rescheduled for the reserve day on 3 September. Both teams earned 0 points.

1 September
(scorecard)

Bahrain; 122/4 (34 overs)	v	Singapore; 164/3 (30.4 overs)
Adil Hanif 36* (53); Buddhika Mendis 2/14 (7 overs)		Buddhika Mendis 103* (78); Halal Abbasi 1/29 (6 overs)

Singapore won by 7 wickets (D/L)
The Padang, Singapore
Umpires: Grant Johnston (Vanuatu) & Simon Taufel (Australia)
Player of the match: Buddhika Mendis

- Heavy rain stopped play with Bahrain at 122/4 off 34 overs. No further play was possible in the Bahrain innings and Singapore were set a revised target of 164 runs off 34 overs.
- Points: Singapore 2, Bahrain 0

1 September
(scorecard)

Guernsey; 184/2 (35.2 overs)	v	Norway
GH Smit 75* (101); Zaheer Ashiq 1/18 (3 overs)

No result
Indian Association, Singapore
Umpires: Sanjay Gurung Gurung & Buddhi Pradhan (both Nepal)

- Match abandoned due to rain. Rescheduled for the reserve day on 3 September. Both teams earned 0 points.

2 September
(scorecard)

Norway; 229 (49.1 overs)	v	Singapore; 230/2 (37.3 overs)
Zaheer Ashiq 92 (71); Monish Arora 2/21 (7 overs)		Buddhika Mendis 90 (94); Aamer Waheed 1/40 (7 overs)

Singapore won by 8 wickets
Kallang, Singapore
Umpires: Kevin Bishop (Hong Kong) & Riaz Chaudhry (Kuwait)
Player of the match: Narender Reddy

- Points: Singapore 2, Norway 0

2 September
(scorecard)

Botswana; 256/9 (50 overs)	v	Bahrain; 187 (34.3 overs)
Faisal Rana 52 (60); Tahir Dar 3/34 (10 overs)		Tahir Dar 33 (25); James Moses 4/28 (10 overs)

Botswana win by 69 runs
The Padang, Singapore
Umpires: Grant Johnston (Vanuatu) & Buddhi Pradhan (Nepal)
Player of the match: James Moses

- Points: Botswana 2, Bahrain 0

2 September
(scorecard)

Guernsey; 212/7 (45 overs)	v	Malaysia; 216/6 (44.1 overs)
Jeremy Frith 79 (85); Manrick Singh 3/33 (9 overs)		Suhan Alagaratnam 80* (93); Lee Savident 2/45 (8.4 overs)

Malaysia win by 4 wickets
Indian Association, Singapore
Umpires: Vinay Kumar Jha (Nepal) & Simon Taufel (Australia)
Player of the match: Suhan Alagaratnam

- Rain delayed the start of play. Match reduced to 45 overs per side.
- Points: Malaysia 2, Guernsey 0

3 September
(scorecard)

Botswana; 233 (50 overs)	v	Malaysia; 235/2 (43.4 overs)
Faisal Rana 63 (78); Hassan Mohammed 5/49 (9 overs)		Rakesh Madhavan 115* (139); Abdul Patel 1/29 (6 overs)

Malaysia won by 8 wickets.
Kallang, Singapore
Umpires: Vinay Kumar Jha (Nepal) & Sarika Prasad (Singapore)
Player of the match: Rakesh Madhavan

- Replay of match that was abandoned on 1 September. Botswana won the toss and chose to bat. Points: Malaysia 2, Botswana 0.

3 September
(scorecard)

Guernsey; 244/9 (50 overs)	v	Norway; 197 (45.4 overs)
GH Smit 71 (116); Iram Dawood 4/49 (10 overs)		Zaheer Ashiq 62 (50); GH Smit 4/27 (7.4 balls)

Guernsey won by 47 runs.
Indian Association, Singapore
Umpires: Sanjay Gurung & Buddhi Pradhan (both Nepal)
Player of the match: GH Smit

- Replay of match that was abandoned on 1 September. Guernsey won the toss and chose to bat. Points: Guernsey 2, Norway 0

4 September
(scorecard)

Malaysia; 183 (50 overs)	v	Singapore; 184/6 (46.3 overs)
Muthuraman Sockalingham 43 (73); Mohammad Shukri 3/34 (8 overs)		Narender Reddy 64 (134); Mulewa Dharmichand 3/37 (10 overs)

Singapore won by 4 wickets
Kallang, Singapore
Umpires: Buddhi Pradhan (NEP) & Simon Taufel (AUS)

- Singapore won the toss and chose to field.

4 September
(scorecard)

Guernsey; 241/6 (50 overs)	v	Botswana; 216 (49.2 overs)
Lee Savident 65 (102); Jamie Nussbaumer 4/42 (8.2 overs)		Abdul Patel 59 (90); James Moses 2/32 (7 overs)

Guernsey won by 25 runs
The Padang, Singapore
Umpires: Sanjay Gurung (NEP) & Sarika Prasad

- Guernsey won the toss and chose to bat.

4 September
(scorecard)

Bahrain; 304/7 (50 overs)	v	Norway; 72 (27.4 overs)
Imran Sajjad 68 (71); Fahad Sadeq 3/16 (5.4 overs)		Shahbaz Butt * 20 (71); Shabaz Butt 2/52 (8 overs)

Bahrain won by 232 runs
Indian Association, Singapore
Umpires: Vinay Kumar Jha (NEP) & Riaz Chaudhry (KUW)

== Final and Playoffs ==
5 September
(scorecard)

Singapore; 242/8 (50 overs)	v	Bahrain; 174 (48.4 overs)
Monish Arora 59 (77); Fahad Sadeq 3/35 (7 overs)		Tahir Dar 73 (80); Saad Janjua 3/19 (9 overs)

Singapore won by 68 runs
Kallang, Singapore
Umpires: Buddhi Pradaan (Nepal) & Sarika Prasad (Singapore)
Player of the match: Monish Arora

- Final. Singapore won the toss and chose to bat.

5 September
(scorecard)

Guernsey; 264/8 (50 overs)	v	Malaysia; 262/7 (50 overs)
Jeremy Frith 101 (121); Hassan Mohammed 4/53 (10 overs)		Ahmed Faiz 67 (77); GH Smith 2/43 (10 overs)

Guernsey won by 2 runs.
The Padang, Singapore
Umpires: Sanjay Gurung & Vinay Kumar Jha (both Nepal)
Player of the match: Jeremy Firth

- 3rd Place Playoff. Malaysia won the toss and chose to field.

5 September
(scorecard)

Botswana; 344/5 (50 overs)	v	Norway; 321 (49.2 overs)
Karan Kapoor 139 (119); Iram Dawood 3/93 (10 overs)		Zaheer Ashiq 69 (50); Abdul Patel 2/26 (5 overs)

Botswana won by 23 runs.
Indian Association, Singapore
Umpires: Grant Johnston (Vanuatu) & Riaz Chaudhry (Kuwait)
Player of the match: Karan Kapoor

- 5th Place Playoff. Botswana won the toss and chose to bat.
