= 2011 ICC World Cricket League Division Six =

Cricket tournament

- Dates: 15 September – 24 September 2011
- Administrator: International Cricket Council
- Cricket format: Limited overs cricket
- Tournament format(s): Round Robin and Playoffs
- Host: Malaysia
- Champions: Guernsey
- Participants: 6
- Matches: 18
- Player of the series: Jeremy Frith (Ggy)
- Most runs: Jeremy Frith (Ggy)
- Most wickets: Ben Stevens (Jer)

The 2011 ICC World Cricket League Division Six was a cricket tournament that took place from 17 to 24 September 2011. It formed part of the ICC World Cricket League and qualifying for the 2015 Cricket World Cup.

The host country for this tournament was Malaysia.

== Teams ==
The teams that took part in the tournament were decided according to the results of the 2009 ICC World Cricket League Division Six, the 2010 ICC World Cricket League Division Five and the 2011 ICC World Cricket League Division Seven.

Team	Last outcome
Jersey	Relegated from 2010 ICC World Cricket League Division Five after finishing 5th
Fiji	Relegated from 2010 ICC World Cricket League Division Five after finishing 6th
Guernsey	Still from 2009 ICC World Cricket League Division Six after finishing 3rd
Malaysia	Still from 2009 ICC World Cricket League Division Six after finishing 4th
Kuwait	Promoted from 2011 ICC World Cricket League Division Seven after finishing 1st
Nigeria	Promoted from 2011 ICC World Cricket League Division Seven after finishing 2nd

== Squads ==
Fiji	Guernsey	Jersey	Kuwait	Malaysia	Nigeria
Joe Rika (C); Viliame Yabaki; Iniasi Cakacaka; Sakaraia Lomani; Kitione Tavo; Sekove Ravoka; Jikoi Kida; Colin Rika; Waisake Tukana; Josefa Baleicicia; Tasheed Tawheed; Maciu Gauna (Wk); Joji Bulabalavu; Mohammed Khan	Stuart Le Provost (C); Gary Rich; Tom Kimber (Wk); Jeremy Frith; James Nussbaumer; Ben Ferbrache (Wk); David Hooper; Tim Ravenscroft; Ross Kneller; Chris van Vliet; Stuart Bisson; Lee Savident; Adam Martel; G H Smit	Peter Gough (C); Edward Farley (Wk); Tom Minty; Sam de la Haye; Charles Perchard; James Faudemer; Ben Stevens; Anthony Hawkins-Kay; Ben Silva; Dean Morrison; Alex Cooke; Paul Connolly; Corey Bisson; Daniel Garton	Hisham Mirza (C); Sibtain Raza (Wk); Mohammad Amin; Abid Mushtaq; Aamir Javed; Irfan Bhatti; Mohammed Naseer; Azmatullah Nazeer; Abdullah Akhunzada; Haroon Shahid; Sharjeel Tahir (Wk); Saad Khalid; Saud Qamar; Qamar Inayat	Suhan Alagaratnam (C); Suresh Navaratnam; Rakesh Madhavan; Hammad Ullah Khan; Hassan Ghulam; Ahmed Faiz; Nik Arifin; Eszrafiq Azis; Rashid Ahad; Shafiq Sharif (Wk); Faris Almas; Aminudin Ramly; Shahrulnizam Yusof; Hiran Brahman Ralalage	Endurance Ofem (C); Ademola Onikoyi (Wk); Kunle Adegbola; Saheed Akolade; Olalekan Awolowo; Olajide Bejide; Joshua Ogunlola; Varun Behani; Segun Olayinka (Wk); Chibuike Iteogu; Oluseye Olympio; Oluwaseun Odeku; Ramit Gill; Sean Philips

== Points table ==
Pos	Team	Pld	W	L	T	NR	Pts	NRR	
1	Guernsey	5	4	0	0	1	9	0.766	Met in the final and promoted to Division Five for 2012
2	Malaysia	5	3	2	0	0	6	0.768	Met in the final and promoted to Division Five for 2012
3	Kuwait	5	3	2	0	0	6	0.329	Met in the 3rd place playoff and remained in Division Six for 2013
4	Jersey	5	3	2	0	0	6	0.132	Met in the 3rd place playoff and remained in Division Six for 2013
5	Fiji	5	1	4	0	0	2	−0.685	Met in the 5th place playoff and relegated to Division Seven for 2013
6	Nigeria	5	0	4	0	1	1	−1.420	Met in the 5th place playoff and relegated to Division Seven for 2013

== Matches ==
17 September
Scorecard

Guernsey; 251/8 (50 overs)	v	Jersey; 242 (49.2 overs)
Jeremy Frith 80 (114); Peter Gough 2/11 (3 overs)		Edward Farley 64 (101); Tim Ravenscroft 3/34 (7.2 overs)

Guernsey won by 9 runs
Kinrara Academy Oval, Kuala Lumpur
Umpires: Viswanadan Kalidas(Mas) and David Odhiambo (Ken)
Player of the match: Jeremy Frith (Ggy)

- Guernsey won the toss and elected to bat

17 September
Scorecard

Malaysia; 88/2 (21 overs)	v	Kuwait; 151 (46.1 overs)
Ahmed Faiz 31* (58); Sibtain Raza 1/15 (5 overs)		Saud Qamar 35 (72); Suresh Navaratnam 4/15 (9.1 overs)

Malaysia won by 38 runs (D/L)
Selangor Turf Club, Kuala Lumpur
Umpires: AR Srinivasan (Oma) and Durga Subedi (Nep)
Player of the match: Suresh Navaratnam (Mas)

- Kuwait won the toss and elected to bat
- Malaysia's innings abandoned due to rain after 21 overs.

17 September
Scorecard

Fiji; 203/8 (50 overs)	v	Nigeria; 140 (41 overs)
Colin Rika 40 (71); Ramit Gill 2/24 (10 overs)		Ramit Gill 36 (76); Iniasi Cakacaka 4/27 (10 overs)

Fiji won by 63 runs
Bayuemas Oval, Kuala Lumpur
Umpires: Steve Davis (Australia) and Imran Mustafa (Kuwait)
Player of the match: Iniasi Cakacaka(Fij)

- Fiji won the toss and elected to bat

18 September
Scorecard

Malaysia; 104/2 (29.1 overs)	v	Nigeria; 101/9 (29 overs)
Shafiq Sharif 43 (73); Oluwaseun Odeku 1/36 (5 overs)		Ademola Onikoyi 25 (41); Eszrafiq Aziz 4/27 (6 overs)

Malaysia won by 79 runs (D/L)
Kinrara Academy Oval, Kuala Lumpur
Umpires: Neil Harrison (Jap) and Imran Mustafa (Kuw)
Player of the match: Eszrafiq Aziz (Mas)

- Nigeria won the toss and elected to field
- Malaysia's innings abandoned due to rain after 29.1 overs, setting the target of 181 runs from 29 overs via the Duckworth–Lewis method.

18 September
Scorecard

Fiji; 171 (42.3 overs)	v	Guernsey; 279/6 (50 overs)
Waisake Tukana 30 (60); Gary Rich 2/22 (10 overs)		Lee Savident 82 (85); Josefa Dabea 2/20 (4 overs)

Guernsey won by 108 runs
Bayuemas Oval, Kuala Lumpur
Umpires: David Odhiambo (Ken) and Durga Subedi (Nep)
Player of the match: Jeremy Frith (Ggy)

- Guernsey won the toss and elected to bat

19 September
Scorecard

Jersey; 156/8 (34 overs)	v	Kuwait; 157/9 (33.3 overs)
Corey Bisson 54 (76); Abdullah Akhunzada 3/22 (5 overs)		Aamir Javed 42 (40); Ben Stevens 3/10 (7 overs)

Kuwait won by 1 wicket
Kinrara Academy Oval, Kuala Lumpur
Umpires: Steve Davis (Aus) and Viswanadan Kalidas(Mas)
Player of the match: Abdullah Akhunzada (Kuw)

- Kuwait won the toss and elected to field
- Match postponed from 18 September due to rain.
- Match reduced to 34 overs a side due to rain.

20 September
Scorecard

Malaysia; 133/2 (35.3 overs)	v	Fiji; 129 (44.4 overs)
Shafiq Sharif 55* (103); Mohammed Khan 2/17 (9 overs)		Colin Rika 27 (45); Eszrafiq Aziz 5/36 (9.4 overs)

Malaysia won by 8 wickets
Kinrara Academy Oval, Kuala Lumpur
Umpires: Imran Mustafa (Kuw) and David Odhiambo (Ken)
Player of the match: Eszrafiq Aziz (Mas)

- Malaysia won the toss and elected to field

20 September
Scorecard

Guernsey; 212 (49.2 overs)	v	Kuwait; 200 (48.4 overs)
Jeremy Frith 82 (95); Sibtain Raza 4/35 (10 overs)		Irfan Bhatti 66 (96); Jamie Nussbaumer 5/35 (8 overs)

Guernsey won by 12 runs
Bayuemas Oval, Kuala Lumpur
Umpires: Steve Davis (Aus) and Neil Harrison (Jap)
Player of the match: Jamie Nussbaumer (Ggy)

- Kuwait won the toss and elected to field

21 September
Scorecard

Fiji; 173/6 (43.5 overs)	v	Kuwait; 162/3 (26.2 overs)
Josefa Rika 55 (75); Sibtain Raza 3/37 (9 overs)		Abid Mushtaq 43 (24); Iniasi Cakacaka 3/13 (6 overs)

Kuwait won by 7 wickets (D/L)
Kinrara Academy Oval, Kuala Lumpur
Umpires: Neil Harrison (Jap) and David Odhiambo (Ken)
Player of the match: Abid Mushtaq (Kuw)

- Kuwait won the toss and elected to field
- Fiji's innings abandoned due to rain after 43.5 overs, setting the target of 161 runs from 29 overs via the Duckworth–Lewis method.

21 September
Scorecard

Guernsey	v	Nigeria; 163/7 (47 overs)
		Olajide Bejide 87* (106); Lee Savident 3/10 (7 overs)

Match abandoned due to rain.
Selangor Turf Club, Kuala Lumpur
Umpires: Imran Mustafa (Kuw) and AR Srinivasan (Oma)

- Nigeria won the toss and elected to bat

21 September
Scorecard

Malaysia; 164 (42.5 overs)	v	Jersey; 171/8 (50 overs)
Suresh Navaratnam 37 (75); Anthony Hawkins-Kay 4/22 (10 overs)		Corey Bisson 38 (85); Suresh Navaratnam 2/39 (10 overs)

Jersey won by 7 runs
Bayuemas Oval, Kuala Lumpur
Umpires: Steve Davis (Aus) and Durga Subedi (Nep)
Player of the match: Anthony Hawkins-Kay (Jer)

- Malaysia won the toss and elected to field

22 September
Scorecard

Jersey; 111/7 (38.4 overs)	v	Nigeria; 110 (32 overs)
Dean Morrison 59* (97); Saheed Akolade 3/22 (8 overs)		Varun Behani 25 (52); James Faudemer 4/25 (8 overs)

Jersey won by 3 wickets
Bayuemas Oval, Kuala Lumpur
Umpires: Viswanadan Kalidas(Mas) and AR Srinivasan (Oma)
Player of the match: Dean Morrison (Jer)

- Jersey won the toss and elected to field
- Match postponed from 20 September due to rain.
- Match reduced to 40 overs a side due to rain.

23 September
Scorecard

Malaysia; 170/9 (50 overs)	v	Guernsey; 174/5 (45.4 overs)
Suhan Alagaratnam 68* (127); Jeremy Frith 3/16 (10 overs)		Lee Savident 40 (68); Hassan Ghulam 1/24 (9 overs)

Guernsey won by 5 wickets
Kinrara Academy Oval, Kuala Lumpur
Umpires: Neil Harrison (Jap) and AR Srinivasan (Oma)
Player of the match: Lee Savident (Ggy)

- Malaysia won the toss and elected to bat

23 September
Scorecard

Fiji; 219 (43.5 overs)	v	Jersey; 247/6 (50 overs)
Josefa Rika 52 (45); Charles Perchard 3/26 (5.5 overs)		Samuel de la Haye 63 (59); Tasheed Tawheed 2/32 (10 overs)

Jersey won by 28 runs
Selangor Turf Club, Kuala Lumpur
Umpires: Steve Davis (Aus) and David Odhiambo (Ken)
Player of the match: Samuel de la Haye (Jer)

- Fiji won the toss and elected to field

23 September
Scorecard

Kuwait; 183/5 (30.2 overs)	v	Nigeria; 182/8 (50 overs)
Irfan Bhatti 73 (85); Kunle Adegbola 2/6 (3 overs)		Sean Philips 61 (89); Mohammed Naseer 3/20 (10 overs)

Kuwait won by 5 wickets
Bayuemas Oval, Kuala Lumpur
Umpires: Viswanadan Kalidas(Mas) and Durga Subedi (Nep)
Player of the match: Abid Mushtaq (Kuw)

- Nigeria won the toss and elected to bat

=== Playoffs ===
==== 5th place playoff ====
24 September
Scorecard

Fiji; 133 (42.4 overs)	v	Nigeria; 235/9 (50 overs)
Josefa Dabea 46* (86); Varun Behani 3/30 (8.4 overs)		Ramit Gill 48 (61); Mohammed Khan 3/39 (9 overs)

Nigeria won by 102 runs
Bayuemas Oval, Kuala Lumpur
Umpires: Neil Harrison (Jap) and Imran Mustafa (Kuw)
Player of the match: Sean Philips (Ngr)

- Nigeria won the toss and elected to bat

==== 3rd place playoff ====
24 September
Scorecard

Jersey; 204 (49.5 ov)	v	Kuwait; 212 (44.5 overs)
Corey Bisson 59 (114); Mohammed Naseer4/29 (8.5 overs)		Saad Khalid 50 (38); Charles Perchard 3/29 (9.5 overs)

Kuwait won by 8 runs
Selangor Turf Club, Kuala Lumpur
Umpires: Viswanadan Kalidas (Mas) and AR Srinivasan (Oma)
Player of the match: Saad Khalid (Kuw)

- Kuwait won the toss and elected to bat

==== Final ====
24 September
Scorecard

Malaysia; 208/9 (50 overs)	v	Guernsey; 211/8 (49.3 overs)
Hammad Ullah Khan 53 (42); GH Smit 3/31 (6 overs)		Tom Kimber 85* (92); Hammad Ullah Khan 3/58 (10 overs)

Guernsey won by 2 wickets
Kinrara Academy Oval, Kuala Lumpur
Umpires: David Odhiambo (Ken) and Durga Subedi (Nep)
Player of the match: Tom Kimber (Ggy)

- Malaysia won the toss and elected to bat

== Statistics ==
=== Most runs ===
The top five highest run scorers (total runs) are included in this table.

Player	Team	Runs	Inns	Avg	S/R	HS	100s	50s
Jeremy Frith	Guernsey	258	5	51.60	76.33	82	0	3
Dean Morrison	Jersey	251	8	41.83	67.11	59*	0	2
Peter Gough	Jersey	246	8	30.75	67.76	55	0	3
Corey Bisson	Jersey	232	8	29.00	50.00	59	0	2
Irfan Bhatti	Kuwait	212	6	35.33	73.35	73	0	2

=== Most wickets ===
The following table contains the five leading wicket-takers.

Player	Team	Wkts	Mts	Ave	S/R	Econ	BBI
Ben Stevens	Jersey	15	8	11.46	21.6	3.18	3/10
Anthony Hawkins-Kay	Jersey	13	8	19.15	25.3	4.52	4/22
Sibtain Raza	Kuwait	12	7	15.41	28.0	3.30	4/35
Eszrafiq Aziz	Malaysia	12	6	16.41	25.8	3.81	5/36
Jamie Nussbaumer	Guernsey	11	6	17.27	26.1	3.95	5/35

== Final Placings ==
After the conclusion of the tournament the teams were distributed as follows:

Pos	Team	Status
1st	Guernsey	Promoted to Division Five for 2012
2nd	Malaysia	Promoted to Division Five for 2012
3rd	Kuwait	Remained in Division Six for 2013
4th	Jersey	Remained in Division Six for 2013
5th	Nigeria	Relegated to Division Seven for 2013
6th	Fiji	Relegated to Division Seven for 2013
