= 2012 ICC World Cricket League Division Five =

2012 ICC WCL Division 5
- Administrator: International Cricket Council
- Cricket format: Limited overs cricket
- Tournament format(s): Round-robin and Knockout
- Host: Singapore
- Champions: Singapore
- Participants: 6
- Matches: 18
- Most runs: Adil Hanif (Bahrain)
- Most wickets: David Hooper (Guernsey)
- Official website: International Cricket Council

The 2012 ICC World Cricket League Division Five was a cricket tournament that took place from 18 to 25 February 2012. It formed part of the ICC World Cricket League and qualifying for the 2015 Cricket World Cup. Singapore hosted the tournament.

== Teams ==
The teams that took part in the tournament were decided according to the results of the 2010 ICC World Cricket League Division Five, the 2010 ICC World Cricket League Division Four, and the 2011 ICC World Cricket League Division Six.

Team	Last outcome
Cayman Islands	Relegated from 2010 ICC World Cricket League Division Four after finishing 5th
Argentina	Relegated from 2010 ICC World Cricket League Division Four after finishing 6th
Bahrain	Still from 2010 ICC World Cricket League Division Five after finishing 3rd
Singapore	Still from 2010 ICC World Cricket League Division Five after finishing 4th
Guernsey	Promoted from 2011 ICC World Cricket League Division Six after finishing 1st
Malaysia	Promoted from 2011 ICC World Cricket League Division Six after finishing 2nd

== Squads ==
Argentina	Bahrain	Cayman Islands	Guernsey	Malaysia	Singapore
Esteban MacDermott (C); Grant Dugmore (Wk); Martin Siri; Pablo Ferguson; Gary Savage; Tomas Francis; Hernan Williams (Wk); Matias Paterlini; Pablo Ryan; Lucas Paterlini; Alejo Tissera; Agustin Husain; Hernan Fennell; Lautaro Musiani	Yaser Sadeq (C); Naeem Amin; Tahir Dar; Shahzad Ahmed (Wk); Adil Hanif (Wk); Ashraf Yaqoob; Zafar Zaheer; Halal Abbasi; Rizwan Baig; Qamar Saeed; Anasim Khan; Adnan Butt; Azeem ul Haq; Fahad Sadeq	Abali Hoilett (C); Steve Gordon; Ryan Bovell; Ainsley Hall (Wk); Alistair Ifill; Conroy Wright; Kevin Bazil; Zachary McLaughlin; Omar Willis (Wk); Troy Taylor; Ramon Sealy (Wk); Marlon Bryan; Pearson Best; Kervin Ebanks	Stuart Le Provost (C); Gary Rich; James Nussbaumer; William Peatfield; Jeremy Frith; Tom Kimber (Wk); Stuart Bisson; Tim Duke; David Hooper; Tim Ravenscroft; Matthew Renouf; Ben Ferbrache (Wk); Ross Kneller; G H Smit	Suresh Navaratnam (C); Rakesh Madhavan; Hammad Ullah Khan; Hassan Ghulam; Ahmad Faiz; Suhan Alagaratnam; Shukri Abdul Rahim; Eszrafiq Aziz; Rashid Ahad; Shafiq Sharif (Wk); Anwar Arudin; Suharril Fetri; Shahrulnizam Yusof; Hiran Brahman Ralalage	Saad Janjua (C); Chetan Suryawanshi (Wk); Chaminda Ruwan; Anish Param; Buddhika Mendis; Kshitij Shinde; Mulewa Dharmichand; Shoaib Razzak; Pramodh Raja; Amjad Mahboob; Riaz Altaff; Munish Arora; Abhiraj Singh; Christopher Janik (Wk)

== Group stage ==
=== Points table ===
Pos	Team	Pld	W	L	T	NR	Pts	NRR	
1	Singapore	5	4	1	0	0	8	1.715	Met in the final and promoted to Division Four for 2012
2	Malaysia	5	4	1	0	0	8	0.600	Met in the final and promoted to Division Four for 2012
3	Guernsey	5	3	2	0	0	6	0.524	Met in the 3rd place playoff and remained in Division Five for 2014
4	Cayman Islands	5	2	3	0	0	4	−0.422	Met in the 3rd place playoff and remained in Division Five for 2014
5	Bahrain	5	2	3	0	0	4	−0.696	Met in the 5th place playoff and relegated to Division Six for 2013
6	Argentina	5	0	5	0	0	0	−2.030	Met in the 5th place playoff and relegated to Division Six for 2013

=== Fixtures ===
18 February
Scorecard

Argentina; 114/7 (29 overs)	v	Malaysia; 210 (44.5 overs)
Matias Paterlini 27* (31); Hassan Ghulam 2/24 (6 overs)		Shafiq Sharif 61 (99); Matias Paterlini 3/50 (9.5 overs)

Malaysia won by 47 runs (D/L)
Indian Association Ground, Singapore
Umpires: Afzal Pathan (Ind) and Durga Subedi (Nep)
Player of the match: Shafiq Sharif (Mas)

- Malaysia won the toss and elected to bat
- Match reduced to 29 overs for Argentina due to rain, setting the target of 162 runs via the Duckworth–Lewis method.

18 February
Scorecard

Bahrain; 49 (13.5 overs)	v	Guernsey; 50/1 (12.5 overs)
Adnan Butt 15 (12); Jamie Nussbaumer 5/19 (6 overs)		Ross Kneller 14* (31); Yaser Sadeq 1/15 (5 overs)

Guernsey won by 9 wickets
The Padang, Singapore
Umpires: Steven Douglas (Ber) and Sri Ganesh (Sin)
Player of the match: Jamie Nussbaumer (Ggy)

- Bahrain won the toss and elected to bat

18 February
Scorecard

Singapore; 141/3 (34 overs)	v	Cayman Islands; 122/8 (32 overs)
Chetan Suryawanshi 42 (43); Ryan Bovell 1/17 (8 overs)		Conroy Wright 46* (39); Mulewa Dharmichand 3/12 (5 overs)

Singapore won by 80 runs (D/L)
Kallang Ground, Singapore
Umpires: Rockie D'Mello (Ken) and Tony Hill (NZ)
Player of the match: Chetan Suryawanshi (Sin)

- Singapore won the toss and elected to bat
- Singapore's innings abandoned due to rain after 34 overs, setting the target of 203 runs from 32 overs via the Duckworth–Lewis method.

19 February
Scorecard

Argentina; 148 (45.1 overs)	v	Bahrain; 213 (48 overs)
Martin Siri 46 (60); Tahir Dar 6/18 (9 overs)		Adnan Butt 49 (33); Matias Paterlini 2/21 (5 overs)

Bahrain won by 65 runs
Kallang Ground, Singapore
Umpires: Afzal Pathan and Narayanan Sivan
Player of the match: Tahir Dar (Bahrain)

- Argentina won the toss and elected to field

19 February
Scorecard

Cayman Islands; 126 (47.5 overs)	v	Malaysia; 130/1 (30.3 overs)
Conroy Wright 56 (98); Suresh Navaratnam 4/15 (10 overs)		Shafiq Sharif 74* (92); Conroy Wright 1/18 (5 overs)

Malaysia won by 9 wickets
The Padang, Singapore
Umpires: Tony Hill (NZ) and Sri Ganesh (Sin)
Player of the match: Shafiq Sharif (Mas)

- Cayman Islands won the toss and elected to bat

19 February
Scorecard

Singapore; 223 (50 overs)	v	Guernsey; 145 (43.4 overs)
Buddhika Mendis 77 (122); Stuart Bisson 3/42 (10 overs)		Jeremy Frith 76 (94); Saad Janjua 3/23 (8.4 overs)

Singapore won by 78 runs
Indian Association Ground, Singapore
Umpires: Rockie D'Mello (Ken) and Durga Subedi (Nep)
Player of the match: Buddhika Mendis (Sin)

- Singapore won the toss and elected to bat

21 February
Scorecard

Argentina; 133/9 (29 overs)	v	Guernsey; 213/7 (42 overs)
Grant Dugmore 42 (57); David Hooper 3/28 (4 overs)		Ross Kneller 86 (64); Pablo Ryan 3/53 (9 overs)

Guernsey won by 29 runs (D/L)
The Padang, Singapore
Umpires: Steven Douglas (Ber) and Narayanan Sivan (Mas)
Player of the match: Ross Kneller (Ggy)

- Argentina won the toss and elected to field
- Match reduced to 42 overs a side due to rain.
- Rain stopped play after 19 overs in Argentina's innings, revising the target to 163 runs from 29 overs via the Duckworth–Lewis method.

21 February
Scorecard

Bahrain; 208/9 (50 overs)	v	Cayman Islands; 83/2 (20.3 overs)
Tahir Dar 60* (50); Conroy Wright 3/59 (10 overs)		Omar Willis 37* (51); Tahir Dar 1/11 (2 overs)

Cayman Islands won by 8 wickets (D/L)
Indian Association Ground, Singapore
Umpires: Tony Hill(NZ) and Afzal Pathan (Ind)
Player of the match: Tahir Dar (Bah)

- Cayman Islands won the toss and elected to field
- Rain stopped play after 17 overs in the Cayman Islands's innings, revising the target to 80 runs from 21 overs via the Duckworth–Lewis method.

21 February
Scorecard

Singapore; 133 (35.5 overs)	v	Malaysia; 184 (49 overs)
Chetan Suryawanshi 46 (35); Suharril Fetri 3/8 (3 overs)		Rakesh Madhavan 77* (141); Riaz Altaff 2/19 (7 overs)

Malaysia won by 27 runs (D/L)
Kallang Ground, Singapore
Umpires: Rockie D'Mello (Ken) and Durga Subedi (Nep)
Player of the match: Rakesh Madhavan (Mas)

- Malaysia won the toss and elected to bat
- Rain stopped play after 30 overs in Singapore's innings, revising the target to 161 runs from 39 overs via the Duckworth–Lewis method.

22 February
Scorecard

Argentina; 93 (37.2 overs)	v	Cayman Islands; 94/0 (22.1 overs)
Grant Dugmore 22 (50); Ryan Bovell 5/9 (7 overs)		Ainsley Hall 62* (64); Esteban MacDermott 0/9 (2 overs)

Cayman Islands won by 10 wickets
Indian Association Ground, Singapore
Umpires: Narayanan Sivan (Mas) and Sri Ganesh (Sin)
Player of the match: Ryan Bovell (Cay)

- Argentina won the toss and elected to bat

22 February
Scorecard

Guernsey; 190 (49.2 overs)	v	Malaysia; 194 (50 overs)
Ross Kneller 47 (48); Hiran Brahman Ralalage 4/28 (9.2 overs)		Suresh Navaratnam 31 (28); Jamie Nussbaumer 3/27 (10 overs)

Malaysia won by 4 runs
Kallang Ground, Singapore
Umpires: Steven Douglas (Ber) and Tony Hill (NZ)
Player of the match: Hiran Brahman Ralalage (Mas)

- Malaysia won the toss and elected to bat

22 February
Scorecard

Singapore; 205/8 (50 overs)	v	Bahrain; 103 (29.5 overs)
Chaminda Ruwan 69 (122); Tahir Dar 2/30 (9 overs)		Adil Hanif 57 (76); Saad Janjua 4/10 (4.5 overs)

Singapore won by 102 runs
The Padang, Singapore
Umpires: Rockie D'Mello (Ken) and Durga Subedi (Nep)
Player of the match: Saad Janjua (Sin)

- Bahrain won the toss and elected to field

24 February
Scorecard

Bahrain; 196/8 (50 overs)	v	Malaysia; 195 (50 overs)
Adil Hanif 65 (80); Suharril Fetri 2/21 (5 overs)		Suhan Alagaratnam 54 (85); Rizwan Baig 4/23 (9 overs)

Bahrain won by 2 wickets
Indian Association Ground, Singapore
Umpires: Steven Douglas (Ber) and Afzal Pathan (Ind)
Player of the match: Rizwan Baig (Bah)

- Malaysia won the toss and elected to bat

24 February
Scorecard

Cayman Islands; 164 (47.5 overs)	v	Guernsey; 167/4 (43.2 overs)
Steve Gordon 54 (81); GH Smit 3/27 (10 overs)		GH Smit 59 (71); Alessandro Morris 2/22 (10 overs)

Guernsey won by 6 wickets
Kallang Ground, Singapore
Umpires: Sri Ganesh (Sin) and Durga Subedi (Nep)
Player of the match: GH Smit (Ggy)

- Cayman Islands won the toss and elected to bat

24 February
Scorecard

Singapore; 239/8 (50 overs)	v	Argentina; 93 (30.5 overs)
Kshitij Shinde 73 (90); Lucas Paterlini 2/50 (10 overs)		Lucas Paterlini 20 (12); Shoaib Razzak 4/14 (6.5 overs)

Singapore won by 146 runs
The Padang, Singapore
Umpires: Tony Hill(NZ) and Narayanan Sivan (Mas)
Player of the match: Kshitij Shinde (Sin)

- Singapore won the toss and elected to bat

== Play-offs ==
=== 5th place playoff ===
25 February
Scorecard

Argentina; 139 (43.3 overs)	v	Bahrain; 141/5 (20.4 overs)
Martin Siri 26 (42); Adil Hanif 4/30 (10 overs)		Adil Hanif 38 (26); Lautaro Musiani 2/40 (4.4 overs)

Bahrain won by 5 wickets
The Padang, Singapore
Umpires: Afzal Pathan (Ind) and Narayanan Sivan (Mas)
Player of the match: Adil Hanif (Bah)

- Argentina won the toss and elected to bat

=== 3rd place playoff ===
25 February
Scorecard

Cayman Islands; 185 (49.5 overs)	v	Guernsey; 186 (47.2 overs)
Pearson Best 79 (97); David Hooper 5/47 (9.5 overs)		Jeremy Frith 57 (81); Troy Taylor 4/50 (10 overs)

Guernsey won by 1 run
Indian Association Ground, Singapore
Umpires: Rockie D'Mello (Ken) and Sri Ganesh (Sin)
Player of the match: David Hooper (Ggy)

- Cayman Islands won the toss and elected to field

=== Final ===
25 February
Scorecard

Singapore; 164/1 (26.4 overs)	v	Malaysia; 159 (47 overs)
Chaminda Ruwan 91* (102); Eszrafiq Aziz 1/37 (6 overs)		Rakesh Madhavan 48 (78); Christopher Janik 3/17 (5 overs)

Singapore won by 9 wickets
Kallang Ground, Singapore
Umpires: Steven Douglas (Ber) and Durga Subedi (Nep)
Player of the match: Chaminda Ruwan (Sin)

- Malaysia won the toss and elected to bat

== Statistics ==
=== Most runs ===
The top five highest run scorers (total runs) are included in this table. The top five highest run scorers (total runs) are included in this table.

Player	Team	Runs	Inns	Avg	S/R	HS	100s	50s
Adil Hanif	Bahrain	265	6	44.16	73.00	65	0	3
Chaminda Ruwan	Singapore	243	6	48.60	69.23	91*	0	3
Jeremy Frith	Guernsey	221	6	55.25	61.21	76	0	2
Anish Param	Singapore	213	6	53.25	62.64	52	0	1
Shafiq Sharif	Malaysia	213	6	42.60	63.77	74*	0	2

=== Most wickets ===
The following table contains the five leading wicket-takers.

Player	Team	Wkts	Mts	Ave	S/R	Econ	BBI
David Hooper	Guernsey	17	6	9.94	14.0	4.26	5/47
Shoaib Razzak	Singapore	15	6	9.86	19.5	3.03	4/14
Jamie Nussbaumer	Guernsey	14	5	9.57	17.1	3.35	4/35
Tahir Dar	Bahrain	12	6	9.66	18.0	3.22	6/18
Ryan Bovell	Cayman Islands	10	6	13.80	26.0	3.18	5/9

== Final Placings ==
Pos	Team	Status
1st	Singapore	Promoted to Division Four for 2012
2nd	Malaysia	Promoted to Division Four for 2012
3rd	Guernsey	Remained in Division Five for 2014
4th	Cayman Islands	Remained in Division Five for 2014
5th	Bahrain	Relegated to Division Six for 2013
6th	Argentina	Relegated to Division Six for 2013
