= International cricket in 2011 =

Cricket season

The 2011 international cricket season was from April 2011 to September 2011. The season saw England take the ICC Test Championship number-one ranking from India when England defeated India in a home Test series 4–0. Australia continued to top the ICC ODI Championship rankings, a position they had held since September 2009. India, despite winning the ICC World Cup the previous season, dropped from number two to number five in September 2011 after losing 0–3 in a five-match ODI series in England.

== Season overview ==
International tours
Start date	Home team	Away team	Results [Matches]		
Start date	Home team	Away team	Test	ODI	T20I
9 April 2011	Bangladesh	Australia	—	0–3 [3]	—
21 April 2011	West Indies	Pakistan	1–1 [2]	2–3 [5]	1–0 [1]
26 May 2011	England	Sri Lanka	1–0 [3]	3–2 [5]	0–1 [1]
28 May 2011	Ireland	Pakistan	—	0–2 [2]	—
4 June 2011	West Indies	India	0–1 [3]	2–3 [5]	0–1 [1]
21 July 2011	England	India	4–0 [4]	3–0 [5]	1–0 [1]
4 August 2011	Zimbabwe	Bangladesh	1–0 [1]	3–2 [5]	—
6 August 2011	Sri Lanka	Australia	0–1 [3]	2–3 [5]	2–0 [2]
25 August 2011	Ireland	England	—	0–1 [1]	—
1 September 2011	Zimbabwe	Pakistan	0–1 [1]	0–3 [3]	0–2 [2]
23 September 2011	England	West Indies	—	—	1–1 [2]
Other international series
Start date	Series			Winners	
11 July 2011	(Scotland) Tri-Nation Series			Sri Lanka	
Minor tours
Start date	Home team	Away team	Results [Matches]		
Start date	Home team	Away team	First-class		List A
21 June 2011	Scotland	Netherlands	0–0 [1]		2–0 [2]
28 June 2011	Ireland	Namibia	—		2–0 [2]
28 July 2011	Kenya	UAE	0–1 [1]		1–1 [2]
2 August 2011	Canada	Afghanistan	0–1 [1]		0–2 [2]
Minor tours
Start date	Home team	Away team	Results [Matches]		
Start date	Home team	Away team	FC	List A	T20
7 September 2011	Netherlands	Kenya	0–0 [1]	2–0 [2]	—
13 September 2011	Ireland	Canada	1–0 [1]	2–0 [2]	—
23 September 2011	Namibia	Scotland	0–0 [1]	0–2 [2]	1–4 [5]
Minor tournaments
Start date	Tournament			Winners	
8 April 2011	(United Arab Emirates) ICC World Cricket League Division Two			UAE	
1 May 2011	(Botswana) ICC World Cricket League Division Seven			Kuwait	
11 August 2011	Cricket Canada Summer Festival			Trinidad and Tobago	
2 September 2011	(New Caledonia) 2011 Pacific Games			Papua New Guinea	
17 September 2011	(Malaysia) ICC World Cricket League Division Six			Guernsey	

== Pre-Season rankings ==
ICC Test Championship 2 April 2011
Rank	Team	Matches	Points	Rating
1	India	42	5357	128
2	South Africa	36	4228	117
3	England	45	5165	115
4	Sri Lanka	27	2951	109
5	Australia	43	4583	107
6	Pakistan	29	2615	90
7	West Indies	25	2128	85
8	New Zealand	32	2482	78
9	Bangladesh	19	131	7

ICC ODI Championship 2 April 2011
Rank	Team	Matches	Points	Rating
1	Australia	48	6161	128
2	India	53	6433	121
3	Sri Lanka	42	4996	118
4	South Africa	37	4307	116
5	England	42	4430	105
6	Pakistan	39	4010	103
7	New Zealand	41	3842	94
8	Bangladesh	38	2573	68
9	West Indies	27	1831	68
10	Ireland	17	712	42
11	Zimbabwe	39	1430	37
12	Netherlands	12	117	10
13	Kenya	13	0	0

== April ==
=== ICC World Cricket League Division Two ===
==== Group stage ====
Pos	Team	Pld	W	L	T	NR	Pts	NRR
1	United Arab Emirates	5	5	0	0	0	10	1.476
2	Namibia	5	4	1	0	0	8	1.838
3	Papua New Guinea	5	3	2	0	0	6	−0.716
4	Hong Kong	5	1	4	0	0	2	−0.462
5	Bermuda	5	1	4	0	0	2	−0.708
6	Uganda	5	1	4	0	0	2	−1.196

Group stage
No.	Date	Team 1	Captain 1	Team 2	Captain 2	Venue	Result
Match 1	8 April	Papua New Guinea	Rarva Dikana	Bermuda	David Hemp	ICC Global Cricket Academy, Dubai	Papua New Guinea by 43 runs
Match 2	8 April	Hong Kong	Najeeb Amar	Uganda	Akbar Baig	ICC Global Cricket Academy Ground No 2, Dubai	Hong Kong by 26 runs
Match 3	8 April	Namibia	Craig Williams	United Arab Emirates	Khurram Khan	Dubai International Cricket Stadium, Dubai	United Arab Emirates by 1 wicket
Match 4	9 April	Bermuda	David Hemp	Hong Kong	Najeeb Amar	ICC Global Cricket Academy, Dubai	Bermuda by 69 runs
Match 5	9 April	Namibia	Craig Williams	Uganda	Akbar Baig	Dubai International Cricket Stadium, Dubai	Namibia by 205 runs
Match 6	9 April	United Arab Emirates	Khurram Khan	Papua New Guinea	Rarva Dikana	ICC Global Cricket Academy Ground No 2, Dubai	United Arab Emirates by 114 runs
Match 7	11 April	Uganda	Davis Arinaitwe	Bermuda	David Hemp	Dubai International Cricket Stadium, Dubai	Uganda by 74 runs
Match 8	11 April	Papua New Guinea	Rarva Dikana	Namibia	Craig Williams	ICC Global Cricket Academy Ground No 2, Dubai	Namibia by 8 wickets
Match 9	11 April	United Arab Emirates	Khurram Khan	Hong Kong	Najeeb Amar	ICC Global Cricket Academy, Dubai	United Arab Emirates by 19 runs
Match 10	12 April	Namibia	Craig Williams	Bermuda	David Hemp	ICC Global Cricket Academy Ground No 2, Dubai	Bermuda by 86 runs
Match 11	12 April	Papua New Guinea	Rarva Dikana	Hong Kong	Najeeb Amar	Dubai International Cricket Stadium, Dubai	Papua New Guinea by 43 runs
Match 12	12 April	Uganda	Davis Arinaitwe	United Arab Emirates	Khurram Khan	ICC Global Cricket Academy, Dubai	United Arab Emirates by 8 wickets
Match 13	14 April	Hong Kong	Najeeb Amar	Namibia	Craig Williams	ICC Global Cricket Academy, Dubai	Namibia by 3 wickets
Match 14	14 April	Papua New Guinea	Rarva Dikana	Uganda	Davis Arinaitwe	ICC Global Cricket Academy Ground No 2, Dubai	Papua New Guinea by 1 runs
Match 15	14 April	United Arab Emirates	Khurram Khan	Bermuda	David Hemp	Dubai International Cricket Stadium, Dubai	United Arab Emirates by 43 runs
Playoffs
5th place playoff	15 April	Bermuda	David Hemp	Uganda	Danniel Ruyange	ICC Global Cricket Academy Ground No 2, Dubai	Uganda by 6 wickets
3rd place playoff	15 April	Papua New Guinea	Rarva Dikana	Hong Kong	Najeeb Amar	ICC Global Cricket Academy, Dubai	Papua New Guinea by 127 runs
Final	15 April	Namibia	Craig Williams	United Arab Emirates	Khurram Khan	Dubai International Cricket Stadium, Dubai	United Arab Emirates by 5 wickets

===== Final Placings =====
Pos	Team	Status
1st	United Arab Emirates	Promoted to 2011–13 ICC World Cricket League Championship & 2011–13 ICC Intercontinental Cup
2nd	Namibia	Promoted to 2011–13 ICC World Cricket League Championship & 2011–13 ICC Intercontinental Cup
3rd	Papua New Guinea	Promoted to 2014 ICC World Cup Qualifier
4th	Hong Kong	Promoted to 2014 ICC World Cup Qualifier
5th	Uganda	Relegated to 2013 Division Three
6th	Bermuda	Relegated to 2013 Division Three

=== Australia in Bangladesh ===
ODI series
No.	Date	Home captain	Away captain	Venue	Result
ODI 3149	9 April	Shakib Al Hasan	Michael Clarke	Sher-e-Bangla National Cricket Stadium, Dhaka	Australia by 60 runs
ODI 3150	11 April	Shakib Al Hasan	Michael Clarke	Sher-e-Bangla National Cricket Stadium, Dhaka	Australia by 9 wickets
ODI 3151	13 April	Shakib Al Hasan	Michael Clarke	Sher-e-Bangla National Cricket Stadium, Dhaka	Australia by 66 runs

=== Pakistan in the West Indies ===
Only T20I
No.	Date	Home captain	Away captain	Venue	Result
T20I 199	21 April	Darren Sammy	Shahid Afridi	Beausejour Stadium, Gros Islet, St Lucia	West Indies by 7 runs
ODI series
No.	Date	Home captain	Away captain	Venue	Result
ODI 3152	23 April	Darren Sammy	Shahid Afridi	Beausejour Stadium, Gros Islet, St Lucia	Pakistan by 8 wickets
ODI 3153	25 April	Darren Sammy	Shahid Afridi	Beausejour Stadium, Gros Islet, St Lucia	Pakistan by 7 wickets
ODI 3154	28 April	Darren Sammy	Shahid Afridi	Kensington Oval, Bridgetown, Barbados	Pakistan by 3 wickets
ODI 3155	2 May	Darren Sammy	Shahid Afridi	Kensington Oval, Bridgetown, Barbados	West Indies by 1 run (D/L)
ODI 3156	5 May	Darren Sammy	Shahid Afridi	Providence Stadium, Georgetown, Guyana	West Indies by 10 wickets
Test series
No.	Date	Home captain	Away captain	Venue	Result
Test 1992	12–16 May	Darren Sammy	Misbah-ul-Haq	Providence Stadium, Georgetown, Guyana	West Indies by 40 runs
Test 1993	20–24 May	Darren Sammy	Misbah-ul-Haq	Warner Park Stadium, Basseterre, St Kitts	Pakistan by 196 runs

== May ==
=== ICC World Cricket League Division Seven ===
==== Group stage ====
Pos	Team	Pld	W	L	T	NR	Pts	NRR
1	Nigeria	5	4	1	0	0	8	0.558
2	Kuwait	5	3	1	0	1	7	1.466
3	Germany	5	3	2	0	0	6	0.357
4	Botswana	5	3	2	0	0	6	−0.438
5	Norway	5	1	4	0	0	2	−0.190
6	Japan	5	0	4	0	1	1	−1.588

Group stage
No.	Date	Team 1	Captain 1	Team 2	Captain 2	Venue	Result
Match 1	1 May	Botswana	Akrum Chand	Kuwait	Hisham Mirza	Botswana Cricket Association Oval 2, Gaborone	Kuwait by 3 wickets
Match 2	1 May	Japan	Masaomi Kobayashi	Germany	Asif Khan	Lobatse Cricket Ground, Lobatse	Germany by 9 wickets
Match 3	1 May	Norway	Damien Shortis	Nigeria	Endurance Ofem	Botswana Cricket Association Oval 1, Gaborone	Nigeria by 5 wickets
Match 4	2 May	Japan	Masaomi Kobayashi	Botswana	Akrum Chand	Botswana Cricket Association Oval 1, Gaborone	Botswana by 8 wickets
Match 5	2 May	Germany	Asif Khan	Nigeria	Endurance Ofem	Lobatse Cricket Ground, Lobatse	Nigeria by 2 wickets
Match 6	2 May	Norway	Iram Dawood	Kuwait	Hisham Mirza	Botswana Cricket Association Oval 2, Gaborone	Kuwait by 7 wickets
Match 7	4 May	Germany	Asif Khan	Botswana	Akrum Chand	Botswana Cricket Association Oval 1, Gaborone	Botswana by 2 wickets
Match 8	4 May	Nigeria	Endurance Ofem	Kuwait	Hisham Mirza	Lobatse Cricket Ground, Lobatse	Kuwait by 9 wickets
Match 9	4 May	Norway	Damien Shortis	Japan	Masaomi Kobayashi	Botswana Cricket Association Oval 2, Gaborone	Norway by 53 runs
Match 10	5 May	Norway	Damien Shortis	Botswana	Akrum Chand	Lobatse Cricket Ground, Lobatse	Botswana by 8 wickets
Match 11	5 May	Germany	Rana-Javed Iqbal	Kuwait	Hisham Mirza	Botswana Cricket Association Oval 1, Gaborone	Germany by 11 runs
Match 12	5 May	Nigeria	Endurance Ofem	Japan	Masaomi Kobayashi	Botswana Cricket Association Oval 2, Gaborone	Nigeria by 90 runs
Match 13	7 May	Botswana	Akrum Chand	Nigeria	Endurance Ofem	Botswana Cricket Association Oval 1, Gaborone	Nigeria by 8 wickets (D/L)
Match 14	7 May	Germany	Asif Khan	Norway	Damien Shortis	Botswana Cricket Association Oval 2, Gaborone	Germany by 18 runs (D/L)
Match 15	7 May	Japan	Masaomi Kobayashi	Kuwait	Hisham Mirza	Lobatse Cricket Ground, Lobatse	Match abandoned
Playoffs
5th place playoff	8 May	Norway	Damien Shortis	Japan	Masaomi Kobayashi	Lobatse Cricket Ground, Lobatse	Norway by 56 runs
3rd place playoff	8 May	Germany	Asif Khan	Botswana	Akrum Chand	Botswana Cricket Association Oval 2, Gaborone	Germany by 25 runs
Final	8 May	Kuwait	Hisham Mirza	Nigeria	Endurance Ofem	Botswana Cricket Association Oval 1, Gaborone	Kuwait by 72 runs

===== Final Placings =====
Pos	Team	Status
1st	Kuwait	Promoted to Division Six for 2011
2nd	Nigeria	Promoted to Division Six for 2011
3rd	Germany	Remain in Division Seven for 2013
4th	Botswana	Remain in Division Seven for 2013
5th	Norway	Relegated to Division Eight for 2012
6th	Japan	Relegated to Division Eight for 2012

=== Sri Lanka in England ===
Test series
No.	Date	Home captain	Away captain	Venue	Result
Test 1994	26–30 May	Andrew Strauss	Tillakaratne Dilshan	Sophia Gardens, Cardiff	England by an innings and 14 runs
Test 1995	3–7 June	Andrew Strauss	Tillakaratne Dilshan	Lord's, London	Match drawn
Test 1996	16–20 June	Andrew Strauss	Kumar Sangakkara	The Rose Bowl, Southampton	Match drawn
Only T20I
No.	Date	Home captain	Away captain	Venue	Result
T20I 201	25 June	Stuart Broad	Thilina Kandamby	County Ground, Bristol	Sri Lanka by 9 wickets
ODI series
No.	Date	Home captain	Away captain	Venue	Result
ODI 3165	28 June	Alastair Cook	Tillakaratne Dilshan	The Oval, London	England by 110 runs (D/L)
ODI 3167	1 July	Alastair Cook	Tillakaratne Dilshan	Headingley, Leeds	Sri Lanka by 69 runs
ODI 3168	3 July	Alastair Cook	Tillakaratne Dilshan	Lord's, London	Sri Lanka by 6 wickets
ODI 3169	6 July	Alastair Cook	Tillakaratne Dilshan	Trent Bridge, Nottingham	England by 10 wickets (D/L)
ODI 3170	9 July	Alastair Cook	Tillakaratne Dilshan	Old Trafford, Manchester	England by 16 runs

=== Pakistan in Ireland ===
ODI series
No.	Date	Home captain	Away captain	Venue	Result
ODI 3157	28 May	William Porterfield	Misbah-ul-Haq	Civil Service Cricket Club Ground, Belfast	Pakistan by 7 wickets (D/L)
ODI 3158	30 May	William Porterfield	Misbah-ul-Haq	Civil Service Cricket Club Ground, Belfast	Pakistan by 5 wickets

== June ==
=== India in the West Indies ===
Only T20I
No.	Date	Home captain	Away captain	Venue	Result
T20I 200	4 June	Darren Sammy	Suresh Raina	Queen's Park Oval, Port of Spain, Trinidad	India by 16 runs
ODI series
No.	Date	Home captain	Away captain	Venue	Result
ODI 3159	6 June	Darren Sammy	Suresh Raina	Queen's Park Oval, Port of Spain, Trinidad	India by 4 wickets
ODI 3160	8 June	Darren Sammy	Suresh Raina	Queen's Park Oval, Port of Spain, Trinidad	India by 7 wickets (D/L)
ODI 3161	11 June	Darren Sammy	Suresh Raina	Sir Vivian Richards Stadium, North Sound, Antigua	India by 3 wickets
ODI 3162	13 June	Darren Sammy	Suresh Raina	Sir Vivian Richards Stadium, North Sound, Antigua	West Indies by 103 runs
ODI 3163	16 June	Darren Sammy	Suresh Raina	Sabina Park, Kingston, Jamaica	West Indies by 7 wickets
Test series
No.	Date	Home captain	Away captain	Venue	Result
Test 1997	20–24 June	Darren Sammy	Mahendra Singh Dhoni	Sabina Park, Kingston, Jamaica	India by 63 runs
Test 1998	28 June–2 July	Darren Sammy	Mahendra Singh Dhoni	Kensington Oval, Bridgetown, Barbados	Match drawn
Test 1999	6–10 July	Darren Sammy	Mahendra Singh Dhoni	Windsor Park, Roseau, Dominica	Match drawn

=== Netherlands in Scotland ===
2011–13 ICC Intercontinental Cup
No.	Date	Home captain	Away captain	Venue	Result
First-class	21–24 June	Gordon Drummond	Peter Borren	Mannofield Park, Aberdeen	Match drawn
2011–13 ICC World Cricket League Championship
No.	Date	Home captain	Away captain	Venue	Result
ODI 3164	28 June	Gordon Drummond	Peter Borren	Mannofield Park, Aberdeen	Scotland by 15 runs
ODI 3166	29 June	Gordon Drummond	Peter Borren	Mannofield Park, Aberdeen	Scotland by 5 wickets (D/L)

== July ==
=== Namibia in Ireland ===
2011–13 ICC Intercontinental Cup
No.	Date	Home captain	Away captain	Venue	Result
First-class	28 June–1 July			Civil Service Cricket Club Ground, Belfast	Game rescheduled
2011–13 ICC World Cricket League Championship
No.	Date	Home captain	Away captain	Venue	Result
List A	4 July	William Porterfield	Craig Williams	Civil Service Cricket Club Ground, Belfast	Ireland by 26 runs
List A	5 July	William Porterfield	Craig Williams	Civil Service Cricket Club Ground, Belfast	Ireland by 8 wickets

=== Tri-Nation Series in Scotland ===
Pos	Team	Pld	W	L	T	NR	BP	Pts	NRR
1	Sri Lanka	2	1	0	0	1	1	7	3.660
2	Scotland	2	1	1	0	0	0	4	−1.735
3	Ireland	2	0	1	0	1	0	2	−0.260

Source: Source

ODI series
No.	Date	Team 1	Captain 1	Team 2	Captain 2	Venue	Result
ODI 3170a	11 July	Ireland	William Porterfield	Sri Lanka	Tillakaratne Dilshan	Grange Club Cricket Ground, Edinburgh	Match abandoned
ODI 3171	12 July	Ireland	William Porterfield	Scotland	Gordon Drummond	Grange Club Cricket Ground, Edinburgh	Scotland by 5 wickets
ODI 3172	13 July	Scotland	Gordon Drummond	Sri Lanka	Tillakaratne Dilshan	Grange Club Cricket Ground, Edinburgh	Sri Lanka by 183 runs

=== India in England ===
Test series
No.	Date	Home captain	Away captain	Venue	Result
Test 2000	21–25 July	Andrew Strauss	Mahendra Singh Dhoni	Lord's, London	England by 196 runs
Test 2001	29 July – 2 August	Andrew Strauss	Mahendra Singh Dhoni	Trent Bridge, Nottingham	England by 319 runs
Test 2003	10–14 August	Andrew Strauss	Mahendra Singh Dhoni	Edgbaston, Birmingham	England by an innings and 242 runs
Test 2004	18–22 August	Andrew Strauss	Mahendra Singh Dhoni	The Oval, London	England by an innings and 8 runs
Only T20I
No.	Date	Home captain	Away captain	Venue	Result
T20I 204	31 August	Stuart Broad	Mahendra Singh Dhoni	Old Trafford, Manchester	England by 6 wickets
ODI series
No.	Date	Home captain	Away captain	Venue	Result
ODI 3186	3 September	Alastair Cook	Mahendra Singh Dhoni	Riverside Ground, Chester-le-Street	No result
ODI 3187	6 September	Alastair Cook	Mahendra Singh Dhoni	The Rose Bowl, Southampton	England by 7 wickets
ODI 3189	9 September	Alastair Cook	Mahendra Singh Dhoni	The Oval, London	England by 3 wickets (D/L)
ODI 3191	11 September	Alastair Cook	Mahendra Singh Dhoni	Lord's, London	Match tied (D/L)
ODI 3195	16 September	Alastair Cook	Mahendra Singh Dhoni	Sophia Gardens, Cardiff	England by 6 wickets (D/L)

=== UAE in Kenya ===
2011–13 ICC Intercontinental Cup
No.	Date	Home captain	Away captain	Venue	Result
First-class	28–31 July	Collins Obuya	Khurram Khan	Gymkhana Club Ground, Nairobi	United Arab Emirates by 266 runs
2011–13 ICC World Cricket League Championship
No.	Date	Home captain	Away captain	Venue	Result
List A	25 July	Collins Obuya	Khurram Khan	Gymkhana Club Ground, Nairobi	Kenya by 66 runs
List A	26 July	Collins Obuya	Khurram Khan	Gymkhana Club Ground, Nairobi	United Arab Emirates by 4 wickets

== August ==
=== Afghanistan in Canada ===
2011–13 ICC Intercontinental Cup
No.	Date	Home captain	Away captain	Venue	Result
First-class	2–5 August	AS Hansra	Nawroz Mangal	Maple Leaf North-West Ground, King City	Afghanistan by 9 wickets
2011–13 ICC World Cricket League Championship
No.	Date	Home captain	Away captain	Venue	Result
ODI 3173	7 August	AS Hansra	Nawroz Mangal	Maple Leaf North-West Ground, King City	Afghanistan by 2 wickets
ODI 3174	9 August	AS Hansra	Nawroz Mangal	Toronto Cricket, Skating and Curling Club, Toronto	Afghanistan by 17 runs

=== Bangladesh in Zimbabwe ===
Only Test
No.	Date	Home captain	Away captain	Venue	Result
Test 2002	4–8 August	Brendan Taylor	Shakib Al Hasan	Harare Sports Club, Harare	Zimbabwe by 130 runs
ODI series
No.	Date	Home captain	Away captain	Venue	Result
ODI 3176	12 August	Brendan Taylor	Shakib Al Hasan	Harare Sports Club, Harare	Zimbabwe by 4 wickets
ODI 3177	14 August	Brendan Taylor	Shakib Al Hasan	Harare Sports Club, Harare	Zimbabwe by 7 wickets
ODI 3179	16 August	Brendan Taylor	Shakib Al Hasan	Harare Sports Club, Harare	Zimbabwe by 5 runs
ODI 3181	19 August	Brendan Taylor	Shakib Al Hasan	Queens Sports Club, Bulawayo	Bangladesh by 6 wickets
ODI 3183	21 August	Brendan Taylor	Shakib Al Hasan	Queens Sports Club, Bulawayo	Bangladesh by 93 runs

=== Australia in Sri Lanka ===
T20I series
No.	Date	Home captain	Away captain	Venue	Result
T20I 202	6 August	Tillakaratne Dilshan	Cameron White	Pallekele International Cricket Stadium, Pallekele	Sri Lanka by 35 runs
T20I 203	8 August	Tillakaratne Dilshan	Cameron White	Pallekele International Cricket Stadium, Pallekele	Sri Lanka by 8 runs
ODI series
No.	Date	Home captain	Away captain	Venue	Result
ODI 3175	10 August	Tillakaratne Dilshan	Michael Clarke	Pallekele International Cricket Stadium, Pallekele	Australia by 7 wickets
ODI 3178	14 August	Tillakaratne Dilshan	Michael Clarke	Mahinda Rajapaksa International Cricket Stadium, Hambantota	Australia by 8 wickets
ODI 3180	16 August	Tillakaratne Dilshan	Michael Clarke	Mahinda Rajapaksa International Cricket Stadium, Hambantota	Sri Lanka by 78 runs
ODI 3182	20 August	Tillakaratne Dilshan	Michael Clarke	R. Premadasa Stadium, Colombo	Australia by 5 wickets
ODI 3184	22 August	Tillakaratne Dilshan	Michael Clarke	R. Premadasa Stadium, Colombo	Sri Lanka won by 4 wickets
Test series
No.	Date	Home captain	Away captain	Venue	Result
Test 2005	31 August – 4 September	Tillakaratne Dilshan	Michael Clarke	Galle International Stadium, Galle	Australia won by 125 runs
Test 2007	8–12 September	Tillakaratne Dilshan	Michael Clarke	Pallekele International Cricket Stadium, Pallekele	Match drawn
Test 2008	16–20 September	Tillakaratne Dilshan	Michael Clarke	Sinhalese Sports Club Ground, Colombo	Match drawn

=== Cricket Canada Summer Festival ===
Pos	Team	Pld	W	L	T	NR	Pts	NRR
1	Trinidad and Tobago	3	2	1	0	0	4	1.737
2	Afghanistan	3	2	1	0	0	4	1.367
3	Canada	3	2	1	0	0	4	0.833
4	United States	3	0	3	0	0	0	−3.850

Source: Source

Twenty20 series
No.	Date	Team 1	Captain 1	Team 2	Captain 2	Venue	Result
Match 1	11 August	Afghanistan	Nawroz Mangal	Trinidad and Tobago	Daren Ganga	Maple Leaf North-West Ground, King City, Ontario	Afghanistan by 35 runs
Match 2	11 August	Canada	Jimmy Hansra	United States	Jignesh Desai	Maple Leaf North-West Ground, King City, Ontario	Canada by 72 runs
Match 3	12 August	Afghanistan	Nawroz Mangal	Canada	Jimmy Hansra	Maple Leaf North-West Ground, King City, Ontario	Canada by 4 wickets
Match 4	12 August	Trinidad and Tobago	Daren Ganga	United States	Jignesh Desai	Maple Leaf North-West Ground, King City, Ontario	Trinidad and Tobago by 111 runs
Match 5	13 August	Afghanistan	Nawroz Mangal	United States	Jignesh Desai	Maple Leaf North-West Ground, King City, Ontario	Afghanistan by 48 runs
Match 6	13 August	Canada	Jimmy Hansra	Trinidad and Tobago	Daren Ganga	Maple Leaf North-West Ground, King City, Ontario	Trinidad and Tobago by 7 wickets

=== England in Ireland ===
Only ODI
No.	Date	Home captain	Away captain	Venue	Result
ODI 3185	25 August	William Porterfield	Eoin Morgan	Clontarf Cricket Club Ground, Dublin	England by 11 runs (D/L)

== September ==
=== Pakistan in Zimbabwe ===
Only Test
No.	Date	Home captain	Away captain	Venue	Result
Test 2006	1–5 September	Brendan Taylor	Misbah-ul-Haq	Queens Sports Club, Bulawayo	Pakistan by 7 wickets
ODI series
No.	Date	Home captain	Away captain	Venue	Result
ODI 3188	8 September	Brendan Taylor	Misbah-ul-Haq	Queens Sports Club, Bulawayo	Pakistan by 5 runs
ODI 3190	11 September	Brendan Taylor	Misbah-ul-Haq	Harare Sports Club, Harare	Pakistan by 10 wickets
ODI 3194	14 September	Brendan Taylor	Misbah-ul-Haq	Harare Sports Club, Harare	Pakistan by 38 runs
T20I series
No.	Date	Home captain	Away captain	Venue	Result
T20I 205	16 September	Brendan Taylor	Misbah-ul-Haq	Harare Sports Club, Harare	Pakistan by 85 runs
T20I 206	18 September	Brendan Taylor	Misbah-ul-Haq	Harare Sports Club, Harare	Pakistan by 5 runs

=== Kenya in the Netherlands ===
2011–13 ICC Intercontinental Cup
No.	Date	Home captain	Away captain	Venue	Result
First-class	7–10 September	Collins Obuya	Peter Borren	Sportpark Het Schootsveld, Deventer	Match abandoned
2011–13 ICC World Cricket League Championship
No.	Date	Home captain	Away captain	Venue	Result
ODI 3192	12 September	Collins Obuya	Peter Borren	Sportpark Westvliet, Voorburg	Netherlands by 2 wickets (D/L)
ODI 3193	13 September	Collins Obuya	Peter Borren	Sportpark Westvliet, Voorburg	Netherlands by 4 wickets

=== Canada in Ireland ===
2011–13 ICC Intercontinental Cup
No.	Date	Home captain	Away captain	Venue	Result
First-class	13–14 September	William Porterfield	Jimmy Hansra	Observatory Lane, Dublin	Ireland by an innings and 11 runs
2011–13 ICC World Cricket League Championship
No.	Date	Home captain	Away captain	Venue	Result
ODI 3196	19 September	William Porterfield	Jimmy Hansra	Clontarf Cricket Club Ground, Dublin	Ireland by 133 runs
ODI 3197	20 September	William Porterfield	Jimmy Hansra	Clontarf Cricket Club Ground, Dublin	Ireland by 56 runs

=== World Cricket League Division Six ===
Pos	Team	Pld	W	L	T	NR	Pts	NRR
1	Guernsey	5	4	0	0	1	9	0.766
2	Malaysia	5	3	2	0	0	6	0.768
3	Kuwait	5	3	2	0	0	6	0.329
4	Jersey	5	3	2	0	0	6	0.132
5	Fiji	5	1	4	0	0	2	−0.685
6	Nigeria	5	0	4	0	1	1	−1.420

Group stage
No.	Date	Team 1	Captain 1	Team 2	Captain 2	Venue	Result
1st Match	17 September	Guernsey	Stuart Le Prevost	Jersey	Peter Gough	Kinrara Academy Oval, Kuala Lumpur	Guernsey by 9 runs
2nd Match	17 September	Malaysia	Suhan Alagaratnam	Kuwait	Hisham Mirza	Selangor Turf Club, Kuala Lumpur	Malaysia by 38 runs (D/L)
3rd Match	17 September	Fiji	Josefa Rika	Nigeria	Endurance Ofem	Bayuemas Oval, Kuala Lumpur	Fiji by 63 runs
4th Match	18 September	Malaysia	Suhan Alagaratnam	Nigeria	Endurance Ofem	Kinrara Academy Oval, Kuala Lumpur	Malaysia by 79 runs (D/L)
5th Match	18 September	Kuwait	Hisham Mirza	Jersey	Peter Gough	Selangor Turf Club, Kuala Lumpur	No result
6th Match	18 September	Guernsey	Stuart Le Prevost	Fiji	Josefa Rika	Bayuemas Oval, Kuala Lumpur	Guernsey by 108 runs
5th Match(R)	19 September	Kuwait	Hisham Mirza	Jersey	Peter Gough	Selangor Turf Club, Kuala Lumpur	Kuwait by 1 wicket
Playoffs
No.	Date	Team 1	Captain 1	Team 2	Captain 2	Venue	Result
Final	24 September	Malaysia	Suhan Alagaratnam	Guernsey	Stuart Le Prevost	Kinrara Academy Oval, Kuala Lumpur	Guernsey by 2 wickets
3rd place playoff	24 September	Jersey	Peter Gough	Kuwait	Hisham Mirza	Selangor Turf Club, Kuala Lumpur	Kuwait by 8 runs
5th place playoff	24 September	Fiji	Josefa Rika	Nigeria	Endurance Ofem	Bayuemas Oval, Kuala Lumpur	Nigeria by 102 runs

==== Final Placings ====
Pos	Team	Status
1st	Guernsey	Promoted to Division Five for 2012
2nd	Malaysia	Promoted to Division Five for 2012
3rd	Kuwait	Remained in Division Six for 2013
4th	Jersey	Remained in Division Six for 2013
5th	Nigeria	Relegated to Division Seven for 2013
6th	Fiji	Relegated to Division Seven for 2013

=== West Indies in England ===
T20I series
No.	Date	Home captain	Away captain	Venue	Result
T20I 207	23 September	Graeme Swann	Darren Sammy	The Oval, London	England by 10 wickets
T20I 208	25 September	Graeme Swann	Darren Sammy	The Oval, London	West Indies by 25 runs

=== Scotland in Namibia ===
2011–13 ICC Intercontinental Cup
No.	Date	Home captain	Away captain	Venue	Result
First-class	23–26 September	Craig Williams	Gordon Drummond	Wanderers Cricket Ground, Windhoek	Match drawn
2011–13 ICC World Cricket League Championship
No.	Date	Home captain	Away captain	Venue	Result
List A	28 September	Craig Williams	Gordon Drummond	Wanderers Cricket Ground, Windhoek	Scotland by 34 runs (D/L)
List A	29 September	Craig Williams	Gordon Drummond	Wanderers Cricket Ground, Windhoek	Scotland by 3 wickets (D/L)
T20 series
No.	Date	Home captain	Away captain	Venue	Result
T20	1 October	Craig Williams	Gordon Drummond	Wanderers Cricket Ground, Windhoek	Scotland by 6 wickets
T20	1 October	Craig Williams	Gordon Drummond	Wanderers Cricket Ground, Windhoek	Scotland by 40 runs
T20	2 October	Craig Williams	Gordon Drummond	Wanderers Cricket Ground, Windhoek	Scotland by 26 runs
T20	4 October	Craig Williams	Richie Berrington	Windhoek High School, Windhoek	Namibia by 116 runs
T20	5 October	Craig Williams	Richie Berrington	Windhoek High School, Windhoek	Scotland by 126 runs
