= Sibtain Raza =

Kuwaiti cricketer (born 1985)

Personal information
- Full name: Sibtain Raza Shah
- Born: 10 October 1985 (age 41); Kuwait City, Kuwait
- Batting: Left-handed
- Bowling: Right-arm off spin
- Role: Bowler

International information
- National side: Kuwait (2002–2015)

Domestic team information
- Years: Team
- 2007–2009: Lahore Shalimar
- 2008: Lahore Lions
- 2009: Lahore Eagles

Career statistics
Competition	FC	LA
Matches	7	4
Runs scored	218	19
Batting average	19.81	4.75
100s/50s	0/1	0/0
Top score	85*	10
Balls bowled	319	132
Wickets	1	3
Bowling average	276.00	38.00
5 wickets in innings	0	0
10 wickets in match	0	0
Best bowling	1/71	2/50
Catches/stumpings	2/–	0/–
- Source: CricketArchive, 30 January 2015

Sibtain Raza Shah (born 10 October 1985) is a cricketer who plays for the Kuwait national cricket team. Born in Kuwait, Sibtain was raised in Pakistan, and played two seasons (2007–08 and 2008–09) in Pakistani domestic tournaments for Lahore-based sides. He made his debut for the Kuwaiti national side in the 2002 ACC Trophy, aged 16, and has played regularly for the team since then.

== Pakistani career ==
A left-handed batsman and right-arm off-spinner, Sibtain was part of the Pakistani under-15 side that made the finals of both the 2000 ACC Under-15 Trophy and the 2000 Costcutters Under-15 World Challenge, losing both matches (to India and the West Indies, respectively). He batted at number three in both tournaments, scoring 110 runs in the ACC event to finish second behind Shahid Yousuf for Pakistan and fifth overall for runs scored. He also took seven wickets in each tournament, with only Sheharyar Khan taking more wickets (8) in the World Challenge.

Sibtain made his debut in Pakistan's Under-19 One-Day Tournament during the 2001–02 season, aged 15, playing for the Karachi Whites under-19 side that lost the tournament's final to a Karachi Blues under-19 side. In the following seasons, he switched to Lahore-based sides, playing for them in inter-district and inter-region under-19 tournaments. Sibtain made his senior debut in inter-district matches during the 2005–06 season. After good form there, he was called up to Lahore Shalimar's squad for the 2007–08 season of the Quaid-i-Azam Trophy. Making his first-class debut against Islamabad in October 2007, he was dismissed cheaply in both innings, and did not bowl.

Although he had come in higher in the batting order on debut, Sibtain was demoted to tenth in the second innings of his second match, against Zarai Taraqiati Bank. He top-scored in that innings with 25 from 17 balls, as Lahore were all out for 128. In the first innings of the next match, against Pakistan International Airlines, Sibtain came in ninth in the batting order. He scored 85 not out from 80 balls, including 14 fours and one six. All of those runs were made in a 90-run eighth-wicket partnership with wicket-keeper Kashif Mahmood, with Sibtain contributing 94% of the partnership's runs. That innings was to be his highest first-class score and only first-class half-century.

Playing for the Lahore Lions, Sibtain made his limited-overs debut later in the 2007–08 season, against Khan Research Laboratories in the ABN-AMRO Cup. He took two wickets in his second match against Habib Bank, finishing with 2/50 from ten overs (his best list-A bowling figures). Sibtain made three further appearances for Lahore Shalimar in the 2008–09 Quaid-i-Azam Trophy, as well as two appearances for the Lahore Eagles in that season's Royal Bank of Scotland Cup, the renamed one-day domestic tournament. Having taken only a single wicket during his first-class career, Sibtain finished with a bowling average of 276.00, among the worst of all time. His is the twelfth-highest first-class bowling average on record, with only Inayatullah (279.00) having a higher average in Pakistani matches.

== Kuwaiti career ==
Although still involved in Pakistani domestic matches, Sibtain made his debut for the Kuwait national side at the 2002 ACC Trophy in Singapore, aged only 16. His next appearances came at the 2004 edition of the tournament in Malaysia, where Kuwait made the semi-finals for the first and, so far, only time, going on to defeat Qatar in the third-place play-off. Sibtain scored 152 runs for the tournament, second only to Khalid Butt for Kuwait, and was named man of the match against the Maldives after making 86 runs from 86 balls and taking 2/18 from five overs.

With the notable exception of the 2010 ACC Trophy Elite tournament, which was hosted in Kuwait for the first time, and the 2014 Asian Games, Sibtain has played for Kuwait in almost all major ACC tournaments since making his debut. He led Kuwait's wicket-taking at the 2011 World Cricket League Division Six, with a best of 4/35 against Guernsey. Against Nepal (the eventual co-winners of the tournament) in the 2012 ACC Trophy Elite, he scored 77 from 84 balls, including four sixes, to help Kuwait to an upset four-wicket win. Other notable performances have included a man-of-the-match 2/20 and 33 not out against Bahrain in the 2013 ACC Twenty20 Cup, and a five-wicket haul, 5/27, against the Maldives in the 2015 edition of the same tournament, which included a hat-trick spread over two overs.
