= Savident =

Savident is a surname. Notable people with the surname include:

- John Savident (1938–2024), British actor
- Lee Savident (born 1976), Guernsey cricketer
