= Ben Fitchet =

Guernsey cricketer (born 1992)

Personal information
- Born: 8 November 1992 (age 34)
- Batting: Right-handed
- Bowling: Right-arm legbreak

International information
- National side: Guernsey
- T20I debut (cap 28): 7 July 2023 v Jersey
- Last T20I: 9 July 2025 v Netherlands

Career statistics
Competition	T20I
Matches	20
Runs scored	349
Batting average	17.45
100s/50s	0/0
Top score	41
Catches/stumpings	6/–
- Source: Cricinfo, 26 May 2026

Ben Fitchet (born 8 November 1992) is a Guernsey cricketer. He was named in Guernsey's squad for the 2017 ICC World Cricket League Division Five tournament in South Africa. He played in Guernsey's opening fixture, against Italy, on 3 September 2017.
