= Shehzad Ahmed (cricketer) =

Danish cricketer (born 1991)

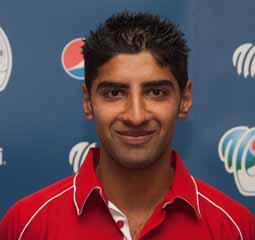

Personal information
- Born: 5 July 1991 (age 35); Denmark
- Height: 6 ft 3 in (1.91 m)
- Batting: Right-handed
- Bowling: Left-arm medium-fast

International information
- National side: Denmark

Domestic team information
- Years: Team
- 1998–2012: Glostrup Cricket Club

Career statistics
Competition	Twenty20
Matches	5
Runs scored	38
Batting average	7.60
100s/50s	0/0
Top score	11
Catches/stumpings	0/–
- Source: Cricinfo, 24 March 2012

Shehzad Ahmed (Urdu: شہزاد احمد; born 5 July 1991) is a Danish cricketer who played for the Danish national team and the 2008 and 2011 Danish champions Glostrup CC. Ahmed is a right-handed opening batsman and wicketkeeper.

Having represented Denmark at the Under-15, U-17 & U-19 levels, Ahmed made his full debut for the national team in the 2011 Nordic Cup against Finland. He contributed 52 runs in their 99-runs victory over the Finland team. Later that year, Ahmed was selected to play for Denmark in the European T20 Championship Division One which was held in Jersey and Guernsey. He played some important innings, especially in the crucial semifinal match against Guernsey, where he made 40 runs out of Denmark's total 136 which sealed the victory and the ticket for next year's ICC World Twenty20 Qualifier.

In March 2012, Denmark took part in the World Twenty20 Qualifier in the United Arab Emirates, having qualified for the event by winning the European T20 Championship. Ahmed was selected in Denmark's fourteen-man squad for the qualifier, making his Twenty20 debut against Bermuda at the Sharjah Cricket Association Stadium. He made four further appearances during the competition, the last of which came against Hong Kong, scoring a total of 38 runs at an average of 7.60, with a high score of 11.

In August 2012, Ahmed was selected in Denmark's fourteen-man squad for the World Cricket League Division Four in Malaysia.

In December 2012, he suffered a serious ACL injury in the left knee during practice.
