= Amar Naeem =

Austrian cricketer (born 1979)

Personal information
- Born: 18 June 1979 (age 47); Faisalabad, Pakistan
- Batting: Right-handed

Domestic team information
- Years: Team
- Austria
- Source: Cricinfo, 5 April 2014

Amar Naeem (born 18 June 1979) is an Austrian cricketer. He played for Austria in the 2011 ICC European T20 Championship Division One tournament. In September 2018, he was the leading run-scorer for Austria in Group A of the 2018–19 ICC World Twenty20 Europe Qualifier tournament, with 100 runs in five matches.
