= Tim Ravenscroft =

Personal information
- Full name: Timothy John Ravenscroft
- Born: 21 January 1992 (age 34); Guernsey
- Height: 5 ft 10 in (1.78 m)
- Batting: Right-handed
- Bowling: Right-arm off break

International information
- National side: Guernsey (2008–2015)

Domestic team information
- Years: Team
- 2011: Hampshire (squad no. 26)

Career statistics
Competition	List A
Matches	1
Runs scored	5
Batting average	5.00
100s/50s	–/–
Top score	5
Catches/stumpings	1/–
- Source: Cricinfo, 30 August 2011

Timothy John Ravenscroft (born 21 January 1992) is a former Guernsey cricketer.

Ravenscroft was spotted by the Guernsey Cricket Association at an early age, after which he began playing age group cricket for Hampshire from the age of eleven after being spotted by Rajesh Maru when he visited Guernsey. Ravenscroft spent the next five years flying between Guernsey and England, however at the age of 16 he took a break from cricket to concentrate on his education. He was educated on Guernsey at Elizabeth College, St Peter Port.

He first appeared for the Guernsey senior team in 2008 in a friendly against Kenya at the County Ground, Hove. Later in 2008, he played for Guernsey in the 2008 European Cricket Championship Division Two. Following his break from county cricket, Ravenscroft decided to once again pursue a career in the game in 2008, after declaring that intention he was offered a contract by Hampshire. In 2010 he briefly played Second XI cricket for Sussex, however he soon returned to Hampshire. He played further matches for Guernsey in 2010, in that seasons European Cricket Championship Division Two, as well as in 2011 in European Championship Division One Twenty20.

Following some solid performances for the Hampshire Second XI during the 2011 season, Ravenscroft made his first eleven debut in a List A match in the Clydesdale Bank 40 against Scotland. He scored 5 runs before being dismissed by Safyaan Sharif. He is the second cricketer from Guernsey to play for Hampshire, after Lee Savident who played for the county from 1997 to 2000. Ravenscroft chose to pursue a career outside of professional cricket following the 2011 season, therefore he was released from his development contract by Hampshire in January 2012. He was selected as part of the Guernsey squad for the 2012 World Cricket League Division Five played in Singapore in February (matches played at amateur level). He played all of Guernsey's matches in the tournament, though generally struggled, posting just a single score above fifty, which came against the Cayman Islands.

In May 2015 he participated in the 2015 ICC Europe Division One tournament.
