= Amitava Banerjee =

Indian born former Guernsey cricketer

Personal information
- Full name: Amitava Amalendu Banerjee
- Born: 1 March 1972 (age 54); Calcutta, West Bengal, India
- Nickname: Ami
- Batting: Right-handed
- Bowling: Right-arm medium
- Role: Occasional wicket-keeper

International information
- National side: Guernsey

Domestic team information
- Years: Team
- 1996/97–2000/2001: Bengal

Career statistics
Competition	First-class	List A
Matches	4	1
Runs scored	92	1
Batting average	18.40	1.00
100s/50s	–/–	–/–
Top score	48	1
Balls bowled	36	–
Wickets	–	–
Bowling average	–	–
5 wickets in innings	–	–
10 wickets in match	–	–
Best bowling	–	–
Catches/stumpings	1/–	–/1
- Source: ESPNcricinfo, 23 December 2009

Amitava Banerjee (born 1 March 1972 in Calcutta, India) is an Indian born former Guernsey cricketer. Banerjee was a right-handed batsman who bowled right-arm medium pace, and who occasionally fielded as a wicket-keeper. He was born in Calcutta, Bengal (today Kolkata).

Banerjee made his debut for his native Bengal in a first-class match in the 1996/97 Ranji Trophy against Assam. In that same season he made his only List A appearance in the Ranji Trophy one-day competition, also against Assam, in a match in which he scored a single run before being dismissed by Sangram Sawant. He didn't appear for Bengal again until the 2000/01 season, making three first-class appearances which came against Tripura, Assam and Odisha. In total, Banerjee made four first-class appearances, scoring 92 runs at an average of 18.40, with a high score of 48.

Banerjee later moved to Guernsey and represented the country's national cricket team in international cricket. His first appearance for Guernsey came against the Scottish Academy in 2005. He also represented Guernsey in the 2006 European Championships, where Guernsey finished in 5th place.
