= Paul Connolly (cricketer) =

Jersey cricketer (born 1990)

Personal information
- Born: 1 November 1990 (age 36); Saint Helier, Jersey
- Batting: Right-handed
- Bowling: Right-arm medium

International information
- National side: Jersey
- Source: Cricinfo, 25 March 2021

Paul Connolly (born 1 November 1990) is a cricketer from Jersey. He played in the 2011 ICC World Cricket League Division Six tournament.
