= Guernsey Cricket Board =

The Guernsey Cricket Board (GCB), previously known as the Guernsey Cricket Association, is the cricket governing body for the island of Guernsey in the Channel Islands.

== History ==
It was founded in 1927, and later joined the England and Wales Cricket Board so the Guernsey cricket team could play in the 38 Counties competition.

The GCB became an affiliate member of the International Cricket Council in its own right in June 2005 and an associate member in June 2008.

== Promotion ==
The Board is active in promoting the sport and in training players and officials.

Ashley Wright is the Head of Cricket and Andy Cornford is the Performance Director.

== Matches ==
Guernsey has the Guernsey cricket team that plays the annual Inter-insular match against Jersey, a tournament started in 1957.

The team also participates as a national team in:

- T20 European tournaments under the ICC Europe (earlier the European Cricket Council) since 2006
- T20 International tournaments in the World Cricket League since 2009

Clubs teams participate in domestic matches.
