= Kshitij Shinde =

Singaporean cricketer (born 1984)

Personal information
- Full name: Kshitij Baliram Shinde
- Born: 23 March 1984 (age 42); Pune, Maharashtra, India
- Batting: Right-handed
- Bowling: n/a
- Role: Wicketkeeper

International information
- National side: Singapore

Domestic team information
- Years: Team
- 2005: Maharashtra
- Source: ESPNcricinfo, 16 May 2016

Kshitij Baliram Shinde (born 23 March 1984) is an Indian-born Singaporean cricketer.

== Career ==
He played in the 2014 ICC World Cricket League Division Three tournament. He has played a first-class match for Maharashtra cricket team in 2005 against Tamil Nadu cricket team at MA Chidambaram Stadium in Chennai where he scored 0 and 17 after opening the innings.
