= Kashif Mahmood =

Pakistani cricketer (born 1985)

Personal information
- Full name: Kashif Mahmood Butt
- Born: 21 December 1985 (age 40); Lahore, Pakistan
- Batting: Left-handed
- Role: Wicket-keeper

Domestic team information
- Years: Team
- 2007/08–2013/14: Lahore Shalimar

Career statistics
Competition	FC	List A
Matches	26	7
Runs scored	593	80
Batting average	16.02	20.00
100s/50s	0/1	0/0
Top score	73	27*
Catches/stumpings	80/5	7/0
- Source: Cricinfo, 9 March 2021

Kashif Mahmood (born 21 December 1985) is a former Pakistani cricketer who played first-class cricket from 2003 to 2016.

Mahmood was a wicket-keeper who played most of his first-class cricket for Lahore teams. His outstanding season was 2010–11, when he captained Lahore Shalimar and made 53 dismissals (49 catches and four stumpings) in nine matches, and scored his only fifty. Against Abbottabad in the Quaid-e-Azam Trophy Division Two, he set a Pakistan first-class record that still stands by taking 12 catches in the match. In the next match a few days later he scored 73 against Quetta.
