= Lee Savident =

English cricketer (born 1976)

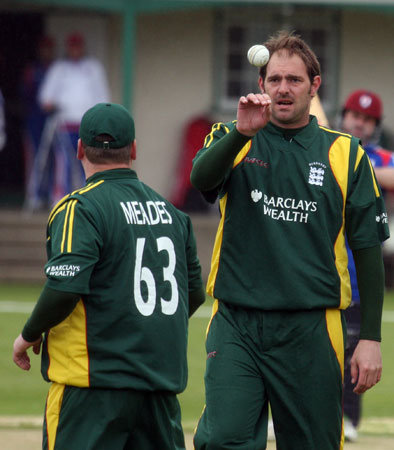
- Savident, pictured playing for Guernsey

Personal information
- Full name: Lee Savident
- Born: 22 October 1976 (age 50); Saint Martin, Guernsey
- Batting: Right-handed
- Bowling: Right-arm medium

International information
- National side: Guernsey

Domestic team information
- Years: Team
- 1997–2000: Hampshire (squad no. 22)
- 2003: Dorset

Career statistics
Competition	First-class	List A
Matches	4	9
Runs scored	32	94
Batting average	8.00	18.80
100s/50s	–/–	–/–
Top score	10*	39
Balls bowled	384	178
Wickets	4	7
Bowling average	71.50	25.42
5 wickets in innings	–	–
10 wickets in match	–	–
Best bowling	2/86	3/41
Catches/stumpings	2/–	–/–
- Source: Cricinfo, 18 August 2009

Lee Savident (born 22 October 1976) is a Guernsey former cricketer who played at first-class level for Hampshire and international cricket for Guernsey. He is the current head coach of the Guernsey cricket team.

== Cricket ==
=== Career with Hampshire ===
Savident was born on the Channel Island of Guernsey at Saint Martin. After impressing on Hampshire during a Guernsey Under-15s cricket tour of the county, Savident signed a professional contract with Hampshire in 1995. It would be two years before he would make his first team debut for Hampshire, as a replacement for the injured Dimitri Mascarenhas, in a first-class fixture against Yorkshire at Portsmouth in the 1997 County Championship; on debut, he took the wickets of Michael Vaughan and David Byas. He made two further appearances in the 1997 County Championship, against Kent and Nottinghamshire. Prior to the 1998 season, he was chosen alongside Andrew Flintoff, Steve Harmison, Owais Shah and Andrew Strauss as one of The Wisden Cricketer's 'Five Young Cricketers to Watch'. In the same season, he made his debut in List A one-day cricket against Middlesex at Lord's in the Axa Life League, with Savident making three appearances in that seasons competition. The following season he featured in a further two one-day matches in the 1998 Axa League. Having not featured for Hampshire in 1999, Savident made his final first-class appearance against the touring Zimbabweans at Southampton in 2000. He also made three one-day appearances in the 2000 Norwich Union National League. Having spent most of his three years at Hampshire beset by injuries, Savident took the decision to retire from the professional game at the end of the 2000 season, doing so alongside Peter Hartley.

After his retirement, he continued to play club cricket in Southern Premier Cricket League for Bournemouth, and from 2002 for Portsmouth. In 2003, he played a List A one-day match for Dorset in the 1st Round of the 2004 Cheltenham & Gloucester Trophy against Buckinghamshire, which was played in 2003 at Bournemouth; however, he did not play minor counties cricket for Dorset. He later played in the Southern Premier Cricket League for BAT Sports, Totton and Eling, and Burridge.

=== Return to Guernsey ===
Savident played for Guernsey in the 2006 European Cricket Championship Division Two in Scotland. He scored 136 against France and was named player of the tournament. He played in the same tournament in 2008. The following year, he moved back to Guernsey. He took part in the 2009 World Cricket League Division Seven, where he played in all five of Guernsey's matches. Guernsey earned promotion to Division Six, which was played in Singapore later in 2009, with Savident again a part of the Guernsey squad. Guernsey remained in Division Six for 2011, which Savident took part in, helping Guernsey gain promotion to Division Five in 2012; however, he was unable to participate in that tournament, having undergone back surgery prior to it. As a result of that tournament, Guernsey remained in Division Five for 2014, which Savident played in. His final match for Guernsey came in the tournament against the Cayman Islands, with Savident scoring an unbeaten 98.

Savident was later appointed head coach of Guernsey in July 2012, replacing Andrew Cornford. Prior to his appointment, he had been assisting performance coach Olly Tapp.
