= Eszrafiq Azis =

Malaysian cricketer

Personal information
- Full name: Eszrafiq Abdul Azis
- Born: 25 January 1986 (age 40); Johor, Malaysia
- Batting: Right-handed
- Bowling: Right-arm medium

Domestic team information
- Years: Team
- 2004: Malaysia
- Source: CricketArchive, 6 January 2008

Eszrafiq Abdul Azis is a Malaysian cricketer. A right-handed batsman and right-arm medium pace bowler, he has played for the Malaysia national cricket team since 2002 and played a first-class match in 2004.

== Biography ==
Born in Johor in 1986, Eszrafiq Azis' first taste of international cricket came when he played for Malaysia Under-15s in the ACC Under-15 Trophy in Kuala Lumpur in 2000. He played in the ICC Under-17 Asia Cup in Pakistan later that year, and in the ACC Under-17 Trophy in Bangladesh in 2001.

He first played for the Malaysian senior side in 2002, playing two matches in that year's Stan Nagaiah Trophy series against Singapore. He followed this by playing in the ACC Trophy in Singapore that July, and the Saudara Cup match against Singapore the following month. He played in the Stan Nagaiah Trophy again in 2003, a year in which he also captained Malaysia's under-19 side in the 2003 Youth Asia Cup, leading his team all the way to the final, where they lost to the Nepal under-19s.

In 2004, after playing in the Stan Nagaiah Trophy and Saudara Cup, he made his first-class debut against the UAE in the ICC Intercontinental Cup in September. He played an ACC Fast Track Countries Tournament match against Hong Kong the following month. He played his final tournament at youth level in November 2005, playing in the ACC Under-19 Cup in Nepal.

He has since become a regular member of the senior Malaysian side, playing 11 internationals for Malaysia throughout 2006, including matches in the 2006 ACC Trophy and 2006 ACC Premier League. He most recently represented his country at the 2007 ACC Twenty20 Cup, playing matches against Qatar and Afghanistan in that tournament.
