= Buddhika Mendis =

Sri Lankan cricketer

Buddika Mendis
Personal information
- Full name: Yange Oshanka Buddhika Mendis
- Born: 22 June 1979 (age 47); Sri Lanka
- Batting: Left-handed
- Bowling: Off spin
- Role: Batsman

Domestic team information
- Years: Team
- 1999–2000: Bloomfield Cricket and Athletic Club
- FC debut: 2 January 1999 Bloomfield v Nondescripts
- Last FC: 18 February 2000 Bloomfield v Police Sports Club
- LA debut: 26 February 2000 Bloomfield v Galle
- Last LA: 12 March 2000 Bloomfield Cricket v Singha Sports Club

Career statistics
Competition	First-class	List A
Matches	6	4
Runs scored	192	31
Batting average	27.42	7.75
100s/50s	0/1	0/0
Top score	85	13
Catches/stumpings	8/2	0/0
- Source: CricketArchive, 15 August 2022

Yange Oshanka Buddhika Mendis (born 22 June 1979) is a Sri Lankan born cricketer. He is a left-handed batsman, off spin bowler and occasional wicket-keeper. He has played for the Singapore national cricket team since 2002, having previously played first-class and List A cricket for Bloomfield Cricket and Athletic Club in his native Sri Lanka.

== Biography ==
Born in Sri Lanka in 1979, Buddhika Mendis started his cricket career playing Bloomfield Cricket and Athletic Club, which makes his outstanding introduction in opposition to nondescripts Cricket Club in January 1999. He played with first-class games to allow those whatsoever, his past arrival in February 2000.

Shortly ahead of the first of the four Listing A games, most of which came from February/March 2000 – he played at the show annually except in 2007. He performed at the ACC Trophy at Kuala Lumpur in 2004 and also participated in the ACC Fast Track Countries Tournament suits versus Nepal along with Hong-kong. This season was when he played with ACC Fast-track Nations Tournament matches from Malaysia and Hongkong. Back in 2006, he played with at the ACC Trophy in Kuala Lumpur, along with an ACC Premier-league game versus Nepal.

Mendis played at the Saudara Cup game from Malaysia for its very first time in 2007 and also played at the ACC Twenty20 Cup in Kuwait this season. He represented Singapore at Division 5 of those Entire World Cricket League at Jersey in 2008.
