= Dean Morrison =

Australian cricketer (born 1978)

Personal information
- Full name: Dean Anthony Morrison
- Born: 12 June 1978 (age 48); Brisbane, Queensland, Australia
- Nickname: Dingo, Willy, Morro
- Height: 1.78 m (5 ft 10 in)
- Batting: Left-handed
- Bowling: Right-arm medium
- Role: Batsman

International information
- National side: Jersey

Career statistics
Competition	World Cricket League
Matches	23
Runs scored	731
Batting average	43.00
100s/50s	0/7
Top score	77
Catches/stumpings	5/–
- Source: Cricinfo, 19 July 2019

Dean Morrison (born 12 June 1978) is an Australian born cricketer who has represented the Jersey national team since 2008 and was previously selected in the Australian Aboriginal national team in 2004.
