= Tahir Dar =

Bahraini cricketer (born 1975)

Personal information
- Full name: Mohammad Tahir Dar
- Born: 17 March 1975 (age 51)
- Batting: Left-handed
- Bowling: Slow left-arm orthodox
- Role: Batsman

International information
- National side: Bahrain
- T20I debut (cap 11): 20 January 2019 v Saudi Arabia
- Last T20I: 24 January 2019 v Qatar
- Source: Cricinfo, 23 February 2020

Mohammad Tahir Dar (born 17 March 1975) is a cricketer who plays for the Bahrain national cricket team. He played in the 2013 ICC World Cricket League Division Six tournament. He made his Twenty20 International (T20I) debut against Saudi Arabia on 20 January 2019 in Oman in the 2019 ACC Western Region T20 tournament.
