= Jeremy Frith =

British cricketer (born 1977)

Personal information
- Full name: Jeremy David John Frith
- Born: 30 October 1977 (age 49); Epsom, England

International information
- National side: Guernsey
- Source: Cricinfo, 24 October 2020

Jeremy Frith (born 30 October 1977) is a British cricketer who played for Guernsey. He played in the 2012 ICC World Cricket League Division Five tournament in Singapore. He was the leading run-scorer for Guernsey in the tournament, with 221 runs in six matches. Frith was appointed as Guernsey's director of cricket in October 2022.
