= Tom Kimber =

Guernsey cricketer (born 1990)

Personal information
- Full name: Thomas CR Kimber
- Born: 10 May 1990 (age 36)
- Batting: Right-handed
- Bowling: Left-arm medium
- Role: Wicket-keeper

International information
- National side: Guernsey
- T20I debut (cap 15): 15 June 2019 v Germany
- Last T20I: 20 June 2019 v Denmark

Career statistics
Competition	T20I
Matches	3
Runs scored	5
Batting average	1.66
100s/50s	0/0
Top score	2
Catches/stumpings	0/1
- Source: Cricinfo, 26 May 2026

Tom Kimber (born 10 May 1990) is a cricketer who plays for Guernsey. He played in the 2014 ICC World Cricket League Division Five tournament. In May 2015 he participated in the 2015 ICC Europe Division One tournament. He played in the 2016 ICC World Cricket League Division Five tournament.

In May 2019, he was named in Guernsey's squad for the 2019 T20 Inter-Insular Cup. The same month, he was named in Guernsey's squad for the Regional Finals of the 2018–19 ICC T20 World Cup Europe Qualifier tournament in Guernsey. He made his Twenty20 International (T20I) debut for Guernsey, against Germany, on 15 June 2019.
