= G. H. Smit =

Guernsey cricketer (born 1976)

Personal information
- Born: 3 February 1976 (age 50); Louis Trichardt, South Africa
- Batting: Right-handed
- Bowling: Right-arm offbreak

International information
- National side: Guernsey
- T20I debut (cap 32): 14 August 2023 v Germany
- Last T20I: 15 August 2023 v Germany

Career statistics
Competition	T20I
Matches	3
Runs scored	62
Batting average	20.66
100s/50s	0/1
Top score	56
Catches/stumpings	0/–
- Source: Cricinfo, 8 July 2025

G. H. Smit (born 3 February 1976) is a former professional cricketer who played internationally for Guernsey. He played in the 2016 ICC World Cricket League Division Five tournament. Smit was named Guernsey Cricketer of the Year in 2012.
