= Guernsey cricket team =

Cricket team in the Channel Islands

Guernsey
- Association: Guernsey Cricket Board

Personnel
- Captain: Oliver Nightingale
- Coach: Jeremy Frith

International Cricket Council
- ICC status: Affiliate (2005); Associate member (2008)
- ICC region: Europe
ICC Rankings	Current	Best-ever
T20I	35th	35th (2 May 2019)

International cricket
- First international: Guernsey v. Jersey (Saint Helier, Jersey; 14 August 1922)

T20 Internationals
- First T20I: v Jersey at College Field, Saint Peter Port; 31 May 2019
- Last T20I: v Jersey at Happy Valley Ground, Episkopi; 23 May 2026
T20Is	Played	Won/Lost
Total	57	26/26 (1 tie, 4 no results)
This year	8	6/1 (0 ties, 1 no result)
- T20 World Cup Qualifier appearances: 1 (Note: From 2023 edition onwards, T20 World Cup Qualifier refers to the Regional Final of the ICC Europe region.) (first in 2025)
- Best result: 5th place (2025)
T20I kit
- As of 23 May 2026

The Guernsey men's cricket team represents the Bailiwick of Guernsey, a Crown dependency, in international cricket. They became an affiliate member of the International Cricket Council (ICC) in 2005 and were promoted to associate member in 2008.

== History ==
=== 2018–present ===
In April 2018, the ICC decided to grant full Twenty20 International (T20I) status to all its members. Therefore, all Twenty20 matches played between Guernsey and other ICC members after 1 January 2019 have the T20I status. Guernsey played their first T20I against Jersey on 31 May 2019.

31 May 2019
16:00 (D/N)
Scorecard

Jersey; 128/9 (20 overs)	v	Guernsey; 128/8 (20 overs)
Corey Bisson 26 (25); Nic Buckle 3/26 (4 overs)		Josh Butler 22 (25); Elliot Miles 3/17 (4 overs)

Match tied
(Jersey won the Super Over)
College Field, Saint Peter Port
Umpires: Neil Hall (Gue) and Martin Tolcher (Gue)
Player of the match: Dominic Blampied (Jer)

- Guernsey won the toss and elected to field.
- First ever T20I match for Guernsey.

== International competition ==
Guernsey has a long rivalry with the neighbouring Channel Island of Jersey, playing an annual encounter against each other known as the inter-insular match since 1950. Guernsey had a run of 10 consecutive defeats from 1992 to 2001.

They made their debut at the European Championship in 2006, and finished in 5th place in Division Two, the tournament being won by Norway. Since then they have won promotion to the T20 Championship Division One.

International matches are being played by Guernsey outside the above two events also, with matches against Bermuda and Namibia in 2005, and more matches against Bermuda in 2006. Games against France and a tour of Canada were planned for 2007.

Guernsey placed second at the 2009 Global Division Seven tournament, advancing to Division Six. In Division Six Guernsey finished 4th and therefore remained in Division Six. They came first in the 2011 Division Six tournament, advancing to 2012 ICC World Cricket League Division Five. However, they came third in the Division Five tournament, remaining in the division, before coming 5th and being relegated to Division Six for the 2015 season, winning immediate promotion puts them back in Division Five, where in 2016 they came third, remaining in Division Five.

In September 2018, Guernsey qualified from Group C of the 2018–19 ICC T20 World Cup Europe Qualifier to the Regional Finals of the tournament.

Guernsey hosted group C of the T20 World Cup European sub-regional qualifier in August 2024, winning the tournament with a six-wicket victory over Denmark in the final to advance to the five-team European final where two places at the 2026 T20 World Cup were at stake. At the European final held in the Netherlands in July 2025, Guernsey finished fifth after losing three matches and having one abandoned without a ball being bowled due to rain.

On 3 May 2026, Matthew Stokes became the first Guernsey player to make a T20I century when he scored exactly 100 against the Isle of Man at King George V Sports Ground. Later that month, Guernsey topped their group at the T20 World Cup Europe Sub-regional Qualifier A in Cyprus with four wins from four matches. They faced Jersey in the final, losing by four-wickets.

== Grounds ==
- College Field Cricket Ground, Saint Peter Port
- King George V Sports Ground, Castel
Locations of all grounds which have hosted international cricket matches within Guernsey

== Tournament history ==
=== T20 World Cup Europe Regional Final ===
ICC T20 World Cup Europe Regional Final records
Year	Round	Position	GP	W	L	T	NR
(Guernsey) 2019	Round-robin	5/6	5	2	3	0	0
(Jersey) 2021	Did not qualify						
(Scotland) 2023	Did not qualify						
(Netherlands) 2025	Round-robin	5/5	4	0	3	0	1
Total	2/4	0 Title	9	2	6	0	1

World Cricket League	T20 World Cup Europe Sub-regional Qualifiers	European Championship Division 2	European T20 Championship Division 1
2009 Division Seven: 2nd place (promoted); 2009 Division Six: 4th place; 2011 Division Six: 1st place (promoted); 2012 Division Five: 3rd place; 2014 Division Five: 5th place (relegated); 2015 Division Six: 2nd place (promoted); 2016 Division Five: 3rd place; 2017 Division Five 6th place (relegated to regional tournaments)	2019: Runners-up (Advanced to regional final); 2023: 3rd place; 2024: Winners (Advanced to regional final)	2006 Division Two : 5th place; 2010 Division Two : 1st place (promoted to European T20 Championship Division 1)	2011 Division One : 4th place; 2013 Division One : 3rd place; 2015 Division One : 4th place; 2018 Division Two : 2nd place; 2019 Division One : 5th place

== Current squad ==
This lists all the players who were part of the squad for 2025 Men's T20 World Cup Europe Regional Final. Uncapped players are listed in italics.

Name	Age	Batting style	Bowling style	Last T20I	Notes
Batters
Tom Nightingale	28	Right-handed	Right-arm off break	(Switzerland) 2025	
Oliver Nightingale	31	Right-handed	Right-arm medium	(Switzerland) 2025	Captain
Ben Fitchet	33	Right-handed	Right-arm leg break	(Netherlands) 2025	
Josh Butler	30	Right-handed	Right-arm medium	(Papua New Guinea) 2025	
Ben Ferbrache	38	Right-handed	Right-arm off break	(Switzerland) 2025	
All-rounder
Matthew Stokes	30	Right-handed	Right-arm medium	(Switzerland) 2025	
Anthony Stokes	30	Right-handed	Slow left-arm orthodox	(Netherlands) 2025	
Wicket-keeper
Alex Bushell	29	Right-handed	—N/a	(Switzerland) 2025	
Isaac Damarell	32	Left-handed	—N/a	(Switzerland) 2025	
Spin Bowlers
Adam Martel	34	Right-handed	Slow left-arm orthodox	(Switzerland) 2025	
Martin Dale-Bradley	39	Right-handed	Right-arm leg break	(Switzerland) 2025	Vice-captain
Pace Bowlers
Luke Bichard	23	Right-handed	Right-arm medium-fast	(Switzerland) 2025	
Charles Birch	21	Right-handed	Right-arm medium	(Jersey) 2025	
Harry Johnson	19	Right-handed	Right-arm medium	(Jersey) 2025	
Charlie Forshaw	19	Right-handed	Right-arm medium	(Switzerland) 2025	

Updated as of 5 July 2025.

== Records and statistics ==
International Match Summary — Guernsey

Last updated 23 May 2026

Playing Record
Format	M	W	L	T	NR	Inaugural Match
Twenty20 Internationals	57	26	26	1	4	31 May 2019

=== Twenty20 International ===
- Highest team total: 198/6 v Isle of Man, 3 May 2026 at King George V Sports Ground, Castel
- Highest individual score: 100*, Matthew Stokes v Isle of Man, 3 May 2026 at King George V Sports Ground, Castel
- Best individual bowling figures: 4/17, Martin-Dale Bradley v Jersey, 6 June 2025 at Grainville Cricket Ground, Saint Saviour

Most T20I runs for Guernsey

Player	Runs	Average	Career span
Matthew Stokes	1,368	40.23	2019–2026
Josh Butler	1,087	27.87	2019–2026
Tom Nightingale	864	21.07	2020–2026
Isaac Damarell	655	20.46	2020–2026
Oliver Nightingale	538	25.61	2022–2026

Most T20I wickets for Guernsey

Player	Wickets	Average	Career span
Luke Bichard	52	20.09	2020–2026
Martin Dale-Bradley	34	20.29	2023–2026
Adam Martel	34	22.08	2022–2026
Matthew Stokes	33	24.66	2019–2026
William Peatfield	29	15.75	2019–2022

T20I record versus other nations

Records complete to T20I #3903. Last updated 23 May 2026.

Opponent	M	W	L	T	NR	First match	First win
vs Associate Members
Austria	2	1	1	0	0	27 July 2022	19 May 2026
Belgium	4	2	2	0	0	8 June 2024	8 June 2024
Bulgaria	2	2	0	0	0	24 July 2022	24 July 2022
Denmark	3	2	0	0	1	18 June 2019	20 June 2019
Estonia	1	1	0	0	0	25 August 2024	25 August 2024
Finland	1	0	1	0	0	24 August 2024	
France	1	1	0	0	0	31 July 2022	31 July 2022
Germany	4	2	2	0	0	15 June 2019	14 August 2023
Isle of Man	4	3	0	0	1	21 August 2020	21 August 2020
Italy	2	0	2	0	0	16 June 2019	
Jersey	17	2	14	1	0	31 May 2019	23 June 2024
Luxembourg	1	1	0	0	0	25 July 2022	25 July 2022
Malta	2	2	0	0	0	22 August 2024	22 August 2024
Netherlands	1	0	1	0	0	9 July 2025	
Norway	3	2	1	0	0	19 June 2019	19 June 2019
Papua New Guinea	1	0	1	0	0	14 August 2025	
Slovenia	2	2	0	0	0	28 July 2022	28 July 2022
Spain	2	1	1	0	0	30 April 2022	1 May 2022
Sweden	1	1	0	0	0	16 May 2026	16 May 2026
Switzerland	3	1	0	0	2	30 August 2025	31 August 2025

== World Cricket League statistics ==
=== Team statistics ===
World Cricket League records against other teams
Opposition	M	W	L	Tie+W	Tie+L	NR	Win%	First Win
Argentina	1	1	0	0	0	0	100.00%	21 February 2012
Bahrain	5	1	3	0	0	1	20.00%	18 February 2012
Botswana	2	2	0	0	0	0	100.00%	4 September 2009
Cayman Islands	4	3	1	0	0	0	75.00%	24 February 2012
Fiji	2	2	0	0	0	0	100.00%	18 September 2011
Gibraltar	1	1	0	0	0	0	100.00%	18 May 2009
Jersey	3	1	2	0	0	0	33.33%	17 September 2011
Japan	2	1	0	0	0	1	50.00%	19 May 2009
Kuwait	1	1	0	0	0	0	100.00%	20 September 2011
Malaysia	6	3	3	0	0	0	50.00%	5 September 2009
Nigeria	4	2	1	0	0	1	50.00%	21 May 2009
Norway	3	2	0	0	0	1	66.66%	1 September 2009
Oman	1	1	0	0	0	0	100.00%	27 May 2016
Singapore	2	0	2	0	0	0	0.00%	
Suriname	3	2	1	0	0	0	66.66%	23 May 2009
Tanzania	2	1	1	0	0	0	50.00%	22 May 2016
Vanuatu	2	2	0	0	0	0	100.00%	21 May 2016
Total	44	25	15	0	0	4	56.81%	

=== Player statistics ===
Performance by Guernsey's cricketers in World Cricket League matches

Current Players
Name	Matches	Runs	Wickets
Lee Savident	23	748	18
Oliver Newey	3	90	2
Lucas Barker	6	164	0
Isaac Damarell	6	128	0
Ben Ferbrache	27	334	0
Jamie Nussbaumer	29	225	43
Matthew Stokes	5	58	4
David Hooper	17	129	24
James Gale	3	24	0
Luke Le Tissier	5	25	7
Max Ellis	6	6	11
William Peatfield	5	20	11
Tom Kimber	24	240	0

Former Players
Name	Matches	Runs	Wickets
Jeremy Frith	26	1234	37
Ross Kneller	23	443	1
GH Smit	18	440	18
Stuart Bisson	20	68	17
Stuart Le Prevost	26	507	0
Tim Ravenscroft	12	147	9
Andy Biggins	2	3	0
Gary Rich	22	45	25
Matthew Renouf	4	5	4
Adam Martel	2	0	0
Chris van Vliet	1	0	0
James Warr	3	83	1
Blane Queripel	9	53	5
Kris Moherndl	12	121	0
Jonathan Warr	4	7	2
Matt Oliver	7	113	0
Justin Meades	2	19	0

== ICC European Championship statistics ==
ICC European Tournaments records versus other nations
Opposition	M	W	L	Tie+W	Tie+L	NR	Win%	First Win
Austria	2	1	1	0	0	0	50.00%	2013
Croatia	2	2	0	0	0	0	100.00%	2008
Denmark	3	1	2	0	0	0	33.33%	2015
France	4	4	0	0	0	0	100.00%	2006
Germany	3	2	1	0	0	0	66.67%	2008
Gibraltar	5	5	0	0	0	0	100.00%	2006
Greece	1	0	1	0	0	0	0.00%	
Israel	2	2	0	0	0	0	100.00%	2006
Italy	3	1	2	0	0	0	33.33%	2011
Jersey	3	0	3	0	0	0	0.00%	
Norway	4	4	0	0	0	0	100.00%	2010
Sweden	1	1	0	0	0	0	100.00%	2013
Total	33	23	10	0	0	0	69.70%	

== Sussex Cricket League ==
Guernsey joined Division 2 of the Sussex Cricket League in 2016 after Sussex clubs voted unanimously to allow the island to join the competition, playing as the Guernsey Sarnians. Guernsey Sarnians cannot be promoted or relegated as they will play fewer games. Each league team plays ONE match against the Guernsey Sarnians XI. The points from these matches are included in team totals, and the Guernsey Sarnians XI's points are factored (by adjustment of bonus points) to show their relative League position.

== Honours ==
=== Top five honours at international matches ===
Highest scores

- Matthew Stokes - 135* vs Botswana at Ashlyns Road, Frinton-on-Sea, Essex on 8 September 2015
- Oliver Newey - 129* vs Fiji at Castle Park Cricket Ground, Colchester, Essex on 7 September 2015
- Jeremy Frith – 106 vs Suriname at King George V Sports Ground, Castel on 23 May 2009
- Jeremy Frith – 101* vs Nigeria at College Field, St Peter Port on 21 May 2009
- Jeremy Frith – 101 vs Malaysia at The Padang, Singapore on 5 September 2009

Best Bowling figures

- Jeremy Frith – 5/8 vs Suriname at King George V SG, Castel on 23 May 2009
- Jamie Nussbaumer – 5/19 vs Bahrain at The Padang, Singapore on 18 February 2012
- Jamie Nussbaumer – 5/35 vs Kuwait at Bayuemas Oval, Kuala Lumpur on 20 September 2011
- David Hooper – 5/47 vs Cayman Islands at The Padang, Singapore on 25 February 2012
- Max Ellis – 4/12 vs Cayman Islands at Royal Selangor Club, Kuala Lumpur on 6 March 2014

Updated to December 2015

=== Famous players ===
Two Guernsey players have played first class cricket elsewhere. Lee Savident, who was born on the island, played for Hampshire from 1997 to 2000, and Amitava Banerjee, who played for Bengal from 1996 to 2000, prior to moving to Guernsey. Batsman Tim Ravenscroft has played for Guernsey and Hampshire, making one List A appearance in 2011.

== See also ==
- Guernsey Cricket Board
- List of Guernsey cricketers
- List of Guernsey Twenty20 International cricketers
