= Swedish cricket team in Denmark in 2021 =

International cricket tour

Sweden cricket team in Denmark in 2021
	Denmark	Sweden
- Dates: 14 – 15 August 2021
Captains	Frederik Klokker	Abhijit Venkatesh

Twenty20 International series
- Results: Denmark won the 3-match series 2–1
Most runs	Taranjit Bharaj (118)	Abhijit Venkatesh (59)
Most wickets	Lucky Ali (5); Delawar Khan (5)	Hassan Mehmood (10)

The Sweden cricket team toured Denmark to play a three-match Twenty20 International (T20I) series at the Svanholm Park in Brøndby. The series formed part of Denmark's preparation for the 2021 ICC Men's T20 World Cup Europe Qualifier, together with a tour of the Netherlands later in August to face Netherlands A. This series was the first international action with the Sweden national team for their coach, former South African international cricketer Jonty Rhodes. Denmark won the series 2–1. Sweden followed the series with another in Finland.

== Squads ==
Denmark	Sweden
Frederik Klokker (c); Aftab Ahmed; Lucky Ali; Surya Anand; Taranjit Bharaj (wk); Oliver Hald; Abdul Hashmi (wk); Omar Hayat; Delawar Khan; Zameer Khan; Nicolaj Laegsgaard; Rizwan Mahmood; Hamid Shah; Musa Shaheen; Shangeev Thanikaithasan	Abhijit Venkatesh (c); Wynand Boshoff (vc, wk); Qudratullah Mir Afzail; Baz Ayubi; Dipanjan Dey; Oktai Gholami; Rahul Gowthaman; Humayun Kabir; Liam Karlsson; Sami Khalil; Rahel Khan; Hassan Mahmood; Lemar Momand; Khalid Zahid; Imal Zuwak

== T20I series ==
=== 1st T20I ===
14 August 2021
10:30
Scorecard

Denmark; 111 (19.5 overs)	v	Sweden; 103/6 (20 overs)
Hamid Shah 25 (21); Hassan Mahmood 5/14 (3.5 overs)		Abhijit Venkatesh 27 (31); Delawar Khan 3/17 (4 overs)

Denmark won by 8 runs
Svanholm Park, Brøndby
Umpires: Allan From (Den) and Jesper Jensen (Den)
Player of the match: Hassan Mahmood (Swe)

- Sweden won the toss and elected to field.
- Frederik Klokker (Den), Wynand Boshoff, Dipanjan Dey, Oktai Gholami, Humayun Kabir, Liam Karlsson, Rahel Khan, Hassan Mahmood, Lemar Momand, Abhijit Venkatesh, Khalid Zahid and Imal Zuwak (Swe) all made their T20I debuts.
- Hassan Mahmood became the first bowler for Sweden to take a five-wicket haul in T20Is.

=== 2nd T20I ===
14 August 2021
14:30
Scorecard

Denmark; 135/4 (20 overs)	v	Sweden; 137/7 (20 overs)
Hamid Shah 66 (56); Hassan Mahmood 2/14 (3 overs)		Wynand Boshoff 32 (30); Lucky Ali 3/15 (4 overs)

Sweden won by 3 wickets
Svanholm Park, Brøndby
Umpires: Allan From (Den) and Jesper Jensen (Den)
Player of the match: Hamid Shah (Den)

- Sweden won the toss and elected to field.
- Surya Anand (Den), Qudratullah Mir Afzail and Rahul Gowthaman (Swe) all made their T20I debuts.

=== 3rd T20I ===
15 August 2021
13:00
Scorecard

Sweden; 122/9 (20 overs)	v	Denmark; 127/4 (19.1 overs)
Rahel Khan 35 (27); Omar Hayat 3/23 (4 overs)		Taranjit Bharaj 63* (46); Hassan Mahmood 3/25 (3.1 overs)

Denmark won by 6 wickets
Svanholm Park, Brøndby
Umpires: Allan From (Den) and Munib Haq (Den)
Player of the match: Taranjit Bharaj (Den)

- Denmark won the toss and elected to field.
- Baz Ayubi (Swe) made his T20I debut.
