= 2020 T20I Nordic Cup =

International cricket tournament

2020 Nordic Cup
- Date: 25–28 August 2020
- Location: Denmark
Teams
Denmark	Finland	Germany
Captains
Most runs
Most wickets

The 2020 T20I Nordic Cup was a planned Twenty20 International (T20I) cricket tournament that had been due to take place in Denmark between 26 and 28 August 2020. The participating teams were to be the hosts Denmark, along with Finland and Germany. The six-match double round-robin series, followed by a final, would have been played at Svanholm Park in Brøndby. The visiting sides were each also scheduled to play a warm-up match against the hosts on 25 August 2020 prior to the start of the tournament. Denmark had also prepared for the tournament by hosting a tour of the Norwegian national team that consisted of two 50-over matches and four unofficial Twenty20 matches between 27 and 31 July 2020, with Denmark winning both of the 50-over matches and the T20 series ending level at two wins apiece.

The tournament was cancelled on 19 August 2020 due to increasing rates of COVID-19 infection in Denmark resulting in travel restrictions. Cricket Finland provisionally agreed to play the same series in early summer 2021.

== Squads ==
Denmark	Finland	Germany
Frederik Klokker (c); Aftab Ahmed; Saad Ahmad; Saif Ahmad; Adeel Akhtar; Lucky Ali; Taranjit Bharaj; Oliver Hald; Jonas Henriksen; Absar Khan; Delawar Khan; Nicolaj Laegsgaard; Hamid Shah; Shangeev Thanikaithasan; Anique Uddin		

== Tour matches ==
25 August 2020
13:20

Denmark XI	v	Finland XI

Svanholm Park, Brøndby

25 August 2020
16:40

Denmark XI	v	Germany XI

Svanholm Park, Brøndby

== Round robin ==
=== Fixtures ===
26 August 2020
10:00

Finland	v	Germany

Svanholm Park, Brøndby

26 August 2020
13:20

Denmark	v	Finland

Svanholm Park, Brøndby

26 August 2020
16:40

Denmark	v	Germany

Svanholm Park, Brøndby

27 August 2020
10:00

Finland	v	Germany

Svanholm Park, Brøndby

27 August 2020
13:20

Denmark	v	Finland

Svanholm Park, Brøndby

27 August 2020
16:40

Denmark	v	Germany

Svanholm Park, Brøndby

=== Final ===
28 August 2020
10:00

TBC	v	TBC

Svanholm Park, Brøndby
