= 2022 T20I Nordic Cup =

International cricket tour

- Date: 7–8 May 2022
- Location: Denmark
- Result: Denmark won the 3-match series 2–1
Teams
- Denmark: Finland
Captains
- Hamid Shah: Nathan Collins
Most runs
- Hamid Shah (156): Nathan Collins (54)
Most wickets
- Omar Hayat (6): Amjad Sher (4)

The 2022 T20I Nordic Cup was a cricket tournament played in Denmark from 7 to 8 May 2022, in the form of a three-match Twenty20 International (T20I) bilateral series between the men's national teams of Denmark and Finland. Two games between Denmark and Finland 'A' teams were also included in the tour, scheduled before and after the T20I series. The venue for all of the matches was Svanholm Park in Brøndby. The event provided both teams with preparation for the 2022–23 ICC Men's T20 World Cup Europe Qualifier subregional tournaments. Finland won the first T20I by three wickets, but Denmark then went on to win the next two matches to win the series 2–1.

== Squads ==
Denmark	Finland
Frederik Klokker (c); Saif Ahmad; Jawad Ali; Lucky Ali; Surya Anand; Saran Aslam; Taranjit Bharaj (wk); Abdul Hashmi; Omar Hayat; Jino Jojo; Absar Khan; Amjad Khan; Abdullah Mahmood; Rizwan Mahmood; Saud Munir; Raisul Saumy; Hamid Shah; Shakerullah Safi; Musa Shaheen; Anique Uddin	Nathan Collins (c); Vanraaj Padhaal (vc); Mohammad Asaduzzaman; Matias Brasier; Hariharan Dandapani; Peter Gallagher; Md Belayet Khan; Parveen Kumar; Sapan Mehta; Raaz Mohammad; Aravind Mohan (wk); Aniketh Pusthay; Areeb Quadir; Atif Rasheed; Nabin Sapkota; Jonathan Scamans (wk); Amjad Sher; Mahesh Tambe

== T20I series ==
=== 1st T20I ===
7 May 2022
11:00
Scorecard

Denmark; 137/8 (20 overs)	v	Finland; 142/7 (19.5 overs)
Rizwan Mahmood 45 (30); Amjad Sher 2/30 (4 overs)		Nathan Collins 36 (42); Omar Hayat 3/31 (4 overs)

Finland won by 3 wickets
Svanholm Park, Brøndby
Umpires: Atif Jamal (Den) and Srinidhi Ravindra (Fin)
Player of the match: Rizwan Mahmood (Den)

- Finland won the toss and elected to field.
- Mohammad Asaduzzaman and Sapan Mehta (Fin) both made their T20I debuts.

=== 2nd T20I ===
7 May 2022
16:00
Scorecard

Denmark; 171/5 (20 overs)	v	Finland; 33 (13 overs)
Taranjit Bharaj 59 (44); Amjad Sher 2/31 (4 overs)		Aniketh Pusthay 10 (14); Lucky Ali 2/1 (2 overs)

Denmark won by 138 runs
Svanholm Park, Brøndby
Umpires: Atif Jamal (Den) and Srinidhi Ravindra (Fin)
Player of the match: Taranjit Bharaj (Den)

- Finland won the toss and elected to field.

=== 3rd T20I ===
8 May 2022
11:00
Scorecard

Denmark; 164/4 (20 overs)	v	Finland; 109/8 (20 overs)
Hamid Shah 99 (67); Aniketh Pusthay 2/15 (3 overs)		Peter Gallagher 34* (21); Abdullah Mahmood 4/12 (4 overs)

Denmark won by 55 runs
Svanholm Park, Brøndby
Umpires: Andreas Rasmussen (Den) and Srinidhi Ravindra (Fin)
Player of the match: Hamid Shah (Den)

- Denmark won the toss and elected to bat.
- Saran Aslam (Den), Matias Brasier and Atif Rasheed (Fin) all made their T20I debuts.

== 'A' series ==
=== 1st T20 ===
6 May 2022
16:00
Scorecard

Denmark A 173/5 (20 overs)	v	Finland A 110/8 (19.1 overs)
Saran Aslam 60 (33); Parveen Kumar 2/20 (3 overs)		Jonathan Scamans 51* (50); Saud Munir 3/7 (2 overs)

Denmark A won by 63 runs
Svanholm Park, Brøndby
Umpires: Aftab Ahmed (Den)
Player of the match: Saran Aslam (Denmark A)

- Finland A won the toss and elected to field.

=== 2nd T20 ===
8 May 2022
15:00
Scorecard

Finland A 93/8 (20 overs)	v	Denmark A 94/1 (12.4 overs)
Mahesh Tambe 27* (31); Saran Aslam 2/10 (4 overs)		Musa Shaheen 42* (37); Raaz Mohammad 1/12 (2 overs)

Denmark A won by 9 wickets
Svanholm Park, Brøndby
Umpires: Andreas Rasmussen (Den) and Srinidhi Ravindra (Fin)
Player of the match: Saran Aslam (Denmark A)

- Denmark A won the toss and elected to field.
