= 2022 Spain Tri-Nation Series =

International cricket tournament

- Date: 29 April – 1 May 2022
- Location: Spain
- Result: Spain won the tournament
- Player of the series: (Spain) Lorne Burns
Teams
Guernsey	Norway	Spain
Captains
Josh Butler	Khizer Ahmed	Christian Munoz-Mills (Note: Lorne Burns captained Spain in their remaining matches after Christian Munoz-Mills retired hurt during the second T20I of the series.)
Most runs
Josh Butler (93)	Sher Sahak (99)	Josh Trembeath-Moro (93)
Most wickets
Luke Bichard (7)	Wahidullah Sahak (4)	Lorne Burns (9)

The 2022 Spain Tri-Nation Series was a Twenty20 International (T20I) cricket tournament that was held in Spain from 29 April to 1 May 2022. The event was the first international series of the 2022 European summer season. The participating teams were the hosts Spain, along with Guernsey and Norway. The series was played at the Desert Springs Cricket Ground in Almería. All competing nations used the event as preparation for the 2022–23 ICC Men's T20 World Cup Europe Qualifier subregional tournaments.

Norway recovered from a slow start to beat Guernsey by 37 runs in the opening game. Day two saw both Spain and Guernsey defeat Norway, before the hosts beat Guernsey to end the day on top of the table. Spain were well beaten by Guernsey on the final morning, but followed this with a comfortable victory over Norway to claim the series.

== Squads ==
Guernsey	Norway	Spain
Josh Butler (c); Luke Bichard; Isaac Damarell (wk); Ben Ferbrache; David Hooper; Nathan Le Tissier; Declan Martel; Oliver Newey (wk); Oliver Nightingale; Tom Nightingale; William Peatfield; Matthew Stokes; Ben Wentzel	Khizer Ahmed (c, wk); Kuruge Abeyrathna; Tafseer Ali; Walid Ghauri; Raza Iqbal; Alijan Younas Malik; Vinay Ravi; Bilal Safdar; Sher Sahak; Wahidullah Sahak; Ali Saleem; Abdullah Sheikh; Ahmadullah Shinwari; Aminullah Tanha	Christian Munoz-Mills (c); Lorne Burns (vc); Raja Adeel; Awais Ahmed (wk); Yasir Ali; Mohammad Atif; Hamza Dar; Daniel Doyle-Calle; Zulqarnain Haider; Mohammad Kamran; Guarang Mayhavhenshi; Ravi Panchal; Charlie Rumistrzewicz; Josh Trembeath-Moro; Tom Vine

== Points Table ==
Pos	Team	Pld	W	L	NR	Pts	NRR
1	Spain	4	3	1	0	6	1.597
2	Guernsey	4	2	2	0	4	−0.678
3	Norway	4	1	3	0	2	−0.916

Source: ESPN Cricinfo

== Fixtures ==
29 April 2022
15:00
Scorecard

Norway; 137/7 (20 overs)	v	Guernsey; 100/7 (20 overs)
Sher Sahak 70* (29); Luke Bichard 2/14 (4 overs)		Josh Butler 17 (28); Raza Iqbal 2/18 (4 overs)

Norway won by 37 runs
Desert Springs Cricket Ground, Almería
Umpires: Gordon Ashford (Esp) and Andrew Elliott (Eng)
Player of the match: Sher Sahak (Nor)

- Norway won the toss and elected to bat.
- Declan Martel, Oliver Nightingale (Gue) and Ali Saleem (Nor) all made their T20I debuts.

30 April 2022
09:00
Scorecard

Spain; 129/5 (20 overs)	v	Norway; 78/9 (20 overs)
Yasir Ali 44 (39); Vinay Ravi 2/10 (4 overs)		Walid Ghauri 23 (28); Yasir Ali 2/12 (3 overs)

Spain won by 51 runs
Desert Springs Cricket Ground, Almería
Umpires: Gordon Ashford (Esp) and Andrew Elliott (Eng)
Player of the match: Yasir Ali (Esp)

- Spain won the toss and elected to bat.
- Lorne Burns, Daniel Doyle-Calle, Mohammad Kamran and Josh Trembeath-Moro (Esp) all made their T20I debuts.

30 April 2022
13:00
Scorecard

Norway; 120/7 (20 overs)	v	Guernsey; 126/2 (18 overs)
Khizer Ahmed 37 (36); Luke Bichard 3/28 (4 overs)		Tom Nightingale 46* (48); Abdullah Sheikh 1/19 (4 overs)

Guernsey won by 8 wickets
Desert Springs Cricket Ground, Almería
Umpires: Gordon Ashford (Esp) and Andrew Elliott (Eng)
Player of the match: Tom Nightingale (Gue)

- Norway won the toss and elected to bat.
- Aminullah Tanha (Nor) made his T20I debut.

30 April 2022
17:00
Scorecard

Guernsey; 78 (18 overs)	v	Spain; 80/2 (12.2 overs)
Josh Butler 16 (19); Lorne Burns 5/11 (4 overs)		Awais Ahmed 42 (29); Matthew Stokes 1/9 (2 overs)

Spain won by 8 wickets
Desert Springs Cricket Ground, Almería
Umpires: Darrin Clark (Esp) and Andrew Elliott (Eng)
Player of the match: Lorne Burns (Esp)

- Guernsey won the toss and elected to bat.
- Ben Wentzel (Gue) made his T20I debut.
- Lorne Burns became the first bowler for Spain to take a five-wicket haul in T20Is.

1 May 2022
10:30
Scorecard

Spain; 107 (20 overs)	v	Guernsey; 111/2 (18 overs)
Josh Trembeath-Moro 28 (29); Luke Bichard 2/14 (3 overs)		Isaac Damarell 38* (45); Raja Adeel 1/12 (3 overs)

Guernsey won by 8 wickets
Desert Springs Cricket Ground, Almería
Umpires: Darrin Clark (Esp) and Andrew Elliott (Eng)
Player of the match: Matthew Stokes (Gue)

- Spain won the toss and elected to bat.

1 May 2022
14:30
Scorecard

Spain; 125/8 (20 overs)	v	Norway; 84 (18.5 overs)
Daniel Doyle-Calle 38 (34); Bilal Safdar 3/17 (4 overs)		Ali Saleem 19 (22); Yasir Ali 3/18 (2.5 overs)

Spain won by 41 runs
Desert Springs Cricket Ground, Almería
Umpires: Darrin Clark (Esp) and Andrew Elliott (Eng)
Player of the match: Daniel Doyle-Calle (Esp)

- Spain won the toss and elected to bat.
