= Michael Richardson (cricketer) =

South African–German cricketer (born 1986)

Personal information
- Full name: Michael John Richardson
- Born: 4 October 1986 (age 40); Port Elizabeth, Cape Province, South Africa
- Batting: Right-handed
- Role: Wicket-keeper
- Relatives: Dave Richardson (father)

International information
- National side: Germany
- T20I debut (cap 19): 19 June 2019 v Denmark
- Last T20I: 25 July 2023 v Jersey

Domestic team information
- Years: Team
- 2010–2019: Durham (squad no. 18)
- 2013/14: Badureliya Sports Club
- 2014/15: Colombo Cricket Club
- 2019: Northumberland

Career statistics
Competition	T20I	FC	LA	T20
Matches	25	103	31	71
Runs scored	511	4,828	1,304	1,025
Batting average	30.05	29.26	56.69	25.00
100s/50s	0/2	6/26	3/10	0/3
Top score	61*	148	111	61*
Catches/stumpings	15/10	186/5	12/0	38/10
- Source: Cricinfo, 17 August 2023

Michael John Richardson (born 4 October 1986) is a South African-born German cricketer. Richardson is a right-handed batsman who also plays as a wicket-keeper. He was born in Port Elizabeth. Richardson made his debut for Durham in a first-class match against Durham MCCU in 2010.

Richardson's family has a strong cricketing background. His father, Dave Richardson, played Test cricket for South Africa. His grandfather, John Richardson, uncle Ralph Richardson, and cousin Matthew Richardson have all played first-class cricket. In 2016 he wed Kate.

In June 2019, he was called up to Germany's team for the Regional Finals of the 2018–19 ICC T20 World Cup Europe Qualifier tournament in Guernsey, replacing Daniel Weston, who broke a finger. Richardson qualified to play for the team by having German citizenship on his mother's side. He made his Twenty20 International (T20I) debut for Germany, against Denmark, on 19 June 2019.

In September 2021, he was named in Germany's T20I squad for the Regional Final of the 2021 ICC Men's T20 World Cup Europe Qualifier tournament. In January 2022, he was named in Germany's team for the 2022 ICC Men's T20 World Cup Global Qualifier A tournament in Oman.
