= Oliver Nightingale =

Guernsey cricketer (born 1995)

Personal information
- Full name: Oliver B Nightingale
- Born: 3 July 1995 (age 31)
- Batting: Right-handed
- Bowling: Right-arm Medium

International information
- National side: Guernsey
- T20I debut (cap 23): 29 April 2022 v Norway
- Last T20I: 23 May 2026 v Jersey

Career statistics
Competition	T20I	T20
Matches	42	42
Runs scored	438	438
Batting average	25.61	25.61
100s/50s	0/1	0/1
Top score	57	57
Catches/stumpings	12/–	12/–
- Source: Cricinfo, 26 May 2026

Oliver Nightingale (born 3 July 1995) is a professional cricketer who plays for Guernsey. He played in the 2016 ICC World Cricket League Division Five tournament. He also represented Guernsey at the 2017 Island Games in swimming.

In April 2022, he was named in Guernsey's Twenty20 International (T20I) squad for the 2022 Spain Tri-Nation Series. He made his T20I debut on 29 April 2022, for Guernsey against Norway, in the opening match of the tri-series.

Nightingale was named as Guernsey captain in December 2023.

He made his maiden T20I half-century against Jersey at the 2025 Men's T20 World Cup Europe Regional Final in the Netherlands, scoring 57 from 52 balls.
