= Anders Bülow =

Danish cricketer

Personal information
- Born: 14 July 1994 (age 32); Horsens, Denmark
- Batting: Right-handed
- Bowling: Right-arm medium

International information
- National side: Denmark (2019–present)
- T20I debut (cap 13): 18 June 2019 v Italy
- Last T20I: 19 June 2019 v Germany
- T20I shirt no.: 74
- Source: Cricinfo, 19 June 2019

Anders Bülow (born 14 July 1994) is a Danish international cricketer who made his debut for the Danish national team in June 2014. He is an all-rounder who bats and bowls right-handed.

== Career ==
Before making his debut for the senior team, Bülow played for Denmark at the under-13, under-15, under-17, and under-19 levels. He represented the Danish under-19s at the 2010, 2011, and 2013 editions of the European Under-19 Championship. Bülow's senior debut for Denmark came at the 2014 World Cricket League Division Four tournament in Singapore. He appeared in two of his team's six matches, a round-robin match against Singapore and the third-place play-off against Italy, and in the latter took 2/42 opening the bowling with Aftab Ahmed. Bülow has since been named in Denmark's squad for the 2016 WCL Division Four event in Los Angeles.

Bülow has also played club cricket for Skanderborg in the Danish Cricket League.

In March 2018, he was named in Denmark's squad for the 2018 ICC World Cricket League Division Four tournament in Malaysia. In September 2018, he was named in Denmark's squad for the 2018 ICC World Cricket League Division Three tournament in Oman. In May 2019, he was included in Denmark's squad for a five-match series against Leinster Lightning in Ireland, in preparation for the Regional Finals of the 2018–19 ICC T20 World Cup Europe Qualifier tournament in Guernsey. The same month, his name was included in Denmark's squad for the Regional Finals qualification tournament. He made his Twenty20 International (T20I) debut for Denmark, against Italy, on 18 June 2019.
