= List of Denmark Twenty20 International cricketers =

This is a list of Danish Twenty20 International cricketers.

In April 2018, the ICC decided to grant full Twenty20 International (T20I) status to all its members. Therefore, all Twenty20 matches played between Denmark and other ICC members after 1 January 2019 have the full T20I status.

This list comprises all members of the Denmark cricket team who have played at least one T20I match. It is initially arranged in the order in which each player won his first Twenty20 cap. Where more than one player won their first Twenty20 cap in the same match, those players are listed alphabetically by surname (according to the name format used by Cricinfo).

Denmark played their first match with T20I status on 16 June 2019 against Jersey during the European Qualifying Finals for the 2019 ICC T20 World Cup Qualifier.

== Key ==
General

- ‡ – Captain
- † – Wicket-keeper
- First – Year of debut
- Last – Year of latest game
- Mat – Number of matches played

Batting

- Runs – Runs scored in career
- HS – Highest score
- 50 – Half-centuries scored
- Avg – Runs scored per dismissal
- * – Batsman remained not out

Bowling

- Balls – Balls bowled in career
- Wkt – Wickets taken in career
- BBI – Best bowling in an innings
- Ave – Average runs per wicket

Fielding

- Ca – Catches taken
- St – Stumpings affected

== List of players ==
Statistics are correct as of 14 July 2026.

Denmark T20I cricketers
General					Batting					Bowling				Fielding		Ref
No.	Name	First	Last	Mat	Runs	HS	Avg	50	100	Balls	Wkt	BBI	Ave	Ca	St	Ref
1	Abdul Hashmi†	2019	2025	26	170	31	12.14	0	0	–	–	–	–	14	7	
2	Saif Ahmad‡	2019	2026	42	732	66	22.87	4	0	690	39	3/9	16.69	12	0	
3	Anique Uddin	2019	2023	13	137	31	11.41	0	0	78	5	2/12	19.39	7	0	
4	Bashir Shah	2019	2021	9	3	1*	3.00	0	0	192	14	3/6	12.28	0	0	
5	Taranjit Bharaj‡†	2019	2026	42	843	63*	24.08	6	0	–	–	–	–	23	3	
6	Delawar Khan	2019	2025	27	230	40*	14.37	0	0	391	24	3/12	18.95	6	0	
7	Oliver Hald	2019	2024	27	180	28	12.85	0	0	405	26	3/5	17.76	15	0	
8	Jino Jojo	2019	2022	13	45	13	11.25	0	0	216	9	2/7	24.00	4	0	
9	Nicolaj Laegsgaard	2019	2024	29	533	91	23.17	3	0	513	33	4/19	14.72	20	0	
10	Hamid Shah‡	2019	2026	44	1648	100	40.19	13	1	380	32	4/19	12.59	25	0	
11	Zishan Shah	2019	2019	6	88	50	22.00	1	0	–	–	–	–	2	0	
12	Rizwan Mahmood	2019	2023	13	158	45	17.55	0	0	–	–	–	–	3	0	
13	Anders Bülow	2019	2019	2	11	11	11.00	0	0	–	–	–	–	0	0	
14	Omar Hayat	2019	2022	8	13	6	3.25	0	0	114	10	3/23	14.10	3	0	
15	Abdullah Mahmood	2019	2026	24	27	9	3.37	0	0	332	22	4/12	16.09	9	0	
16	Aftab Ahmed	2019	2021	4	15	10	5.00	0	0	30	1	1/10	41.00	0	0	
17	Lucky Ali	2019	2026	32	201	26	14.35	0	0	408	22	3/15	17.95	8	0	
18	Ihyas Sawmy	2019	2019	2	0	0*	0.00	0	0	18	1	1/12	12.00	1	0	
19	Zameer Khan†	2019	2021	8	137	33	19.57	0	0	–	–	–	–	3	1	
20	Musa Shaheen	2019	2026	33	520	80	19.25	2	0	20	3	3/11	7.00	16	0	
21	Frederik Klokker‡†	2021	2022	13	59	29*	29.50	0	0	–	–	–	–	6	2	
22	Surya Anand	2021	2026	38	390	50*	24.37	1	0	625	29	4/2	22.55	7	0	
23	Amjad Khan‡ (Note: Amjad Khan also played 1 Twenty20 International match for England. Only his record for Denmark is given above.)	2021	2022	8	47	16	7.83	0	0	113	5	2/25	23.20	0	0	
24	Shakerullah Safi	2021	2021	4	0	0*	–	0	0	18	0	–	–	0	0	
25	Shangeev Thanikaithasan	2021	2026	33	458	52	16.35	1	0	73	2	1/1	46.00	18	0	
26	Bilal Aftab	2021	2021	3	2	1*	2.00	0	0	12	1	1/13	13.00	0	0	
27	Absar Khan	2021	2021	2	2	4*	6.00	0	0	6	1	1/8	8.00	1	0	
28	Saran Aslam	2022	2024	12	83	47	13.83	0	0	42	2	2/14	24.00	0	0	
29	Saud Munir	2022	2026	20	25	6*	12.50	0	0	400	26	5/21	15.80	6	0	
30	Magnus Kristensen	2023	2023	2	6	6	6.00	0	0	18	0	–	–	1	0	
31	Jonas Henriksen	2023	2024	5	44	22*	14.66	0	0	36	1	1/28	81.00	0	0	
32	Eshan Karimi	2023	2026	16	9	2*	3.00	0	0	312	19	4/21	18.68	7	0	
33	Toqeer Ahmad	2024	2024	6	1	1	0.50	0	0	118	8	3/21	16.37	1	0	
34	Shakeel Zeb	2025	2025	3	13	13	13.00	0	0	63	5	3/14	15.60	1	0	
35	Sebastian Heath†	2026	2026	9	273	61*	34.12	1	0	–	–	–	–	7	5	
36	Jabran Khan	2026	2026	2	1	1	1.00	0	0	–	–	–	–	1	0	
37	Mustakim Aslam	2026	2026	4	1	1	1.00	0	0	78	3	2/31	34.66	1	0	
38	Simon Sørensen	2026	2026	3	–	–	–	–	–	60	6	3/18	12.00	2	0	
39	Dinesh Raman	2026	2026	1	9	9	9.00	0	0	–	–	–	–	0	0	
40	Nicholas Sonne-Rudd	2026	2026	5	–	–	–	–	–	84	4	1/10	21.75	2	0	
