= Jordan Martel =

Guernsey cricketer (born 1996)

Personal information
- Born: 11 June 1996 (age 30)
- Batting: Right-handed
- Bowling: Left-arm medium
- Role: Bowler

International information
- National side: Guernsey
- T20I debut (cap 16): 18 June 2019 v Denmark
- Last T20I: 20 June 2019 v Denmark

Career statistics
Competition	T20I
Matches	3
Runs scored	13
Batting average	–
100s/50s	0/0
Top score	13*
Balls bowled	66
Wickets	6
Bowling average	9.83
5 wickets in innings	0
10 wickets in match	0
Best bowling	3/15
Catches/stumpings	0/–
- Source: Cricinfo, 27 May 2026

Jordan Martel (born 11 June 1996) is a Guernsey cricketer. He was named in Guernsey's squad for the 2015 ICC World Cricket League Division Six tournament in England. In May 2019, he was named in Guernsey's squad for the 2019 T20 Inter-Insular Cup. The same month, he was named in Guernsey's squad for the Regional Finals of the 2018–19 ICC T20 World Cup Europe Qualifier tournament in Guernsey. He made his Twenty20 International (T20I) debut for Guernsey, against Denmark, on 18 June 2019.
