= Abdullah Sheikh =

Norwegian cricketer (born 1998)

Personal information
- Born: 28 May 1998 (age 28); Oslo, Norway
- Batting: Right-handed
- Bowling: Right-arm legbreak

International information
- National side: Norway
- T20I debut (cap 12): 16 June 2019 v Jersey
- Last T20I: 30 April 2022 v Guernsey
- Source: Cricinfo, 30 April 2022

Abdullah Sheikh (born 28 May 1998) is a Norwegian cricketer who plays for the national team. He was born in Oslo. In May 2019, he was named in Norway's squad for the Regional Finals of the 2018–19 ICC T20 World Cup Europe Qualifier tournament in Guernsey. He made his Twenty20 International (T20I) debut against Jersey on 16 June 2019.
