= Anthony Stokes (cricketer) =

Guernsey cricketer (born 1998)

Personal information
- Full name: Anthony Cameron Fisher Stokes
- Born: 1 November 1998 (age 28); Saint Peter Port, Guernsey
- Batting: Right-handed
- Bowling: Left-arm orthodox spin
- Role: Spin bowler
- Relatives: Matthew Stokes (brother)

International information
- National side: Guernsey
- T20I debut (cap 9): 31 May 2019 v Jersey
- Last T20I: 9 July 2025 v Netherlands

Career statistics
Competition	T20I
Matches	21
Runs scored	60
Batting average	6.00
100s/50s	0/0
Top score	18*
Balls bowled	425
Wickets	23
Bowling average	18.47
5 wickets in innings	0
10 wickets in match	0
Best bowling	3/9
Catches/stumpings	11/–
- Source: ESPNcricinfo, 26 May 2026

Anthony Stokes (born 1 November 1998) is a cricketer who plays for Guernsey. He is from Saint Peter Port and is the brother of Matthew Stokes.

In May 2019, Stokes was named in Guernsey's squad for the 2019 T20 Inter-Insular Cup, and made his Twenty20 International (T20I) debut against Jersey on 31 May 2019. The same month, he was named in Guernsey's squad for the Regional Finals of the 2018–19 ICC T20 World Cup Europe Qualifier tournament in Guernsey. He played in Guernsey's opening match of the Regional Finals, also against Jersey, on 15 June 2019.
