= Jino Jojo =

Danish cricketer (born 1987)

Personal information
- Full name: Jino Jojo
- Born: 19 March 1987 (age 39); Njarackal, Kerala, India
- Batting: Right-handed
- Bowling: Right-arm medium
- Role: All-rounder

International information
- National side: Denmark
- T20I debut (cap 8): 16 June 2019 v Jersey
- Last T20I: 1 July 2022 v Belgium
- Source: ESPNcricinfo, 1 July 2022

Jino Jojo (born 19 March 1987) is an Indian-born Danish cricketer, who has played for Denmark's national cricket team. In October 2018, he was named in Denmark's squad for the 2018 ICC World Cricket League Division Three tournament in Oman. Known as an all-rounder, Jojo played in Denmark's fixture against the United States on 15 November 2018.

In May 2019, Jojo was named in Denmark's squad for a five-match series against Leinster Lightning in Ireland, in preparation for the Regional Finals of the 2018–19 ICC T20 World Cup Europe Qualifier tournament in Guernsey. The same month, he was named in Denmark's squad for the Regional Finals qualification tournament. He made his Twenty20 International (T20I) debut for Denmark, against Jersey, on 16 June 2019.

In August 2019, Jojo was named in Denmark's squad for the 2019 Malaysia Cricket World Cup Challenge League A tournament. He made his List A debut against Malaysia, in the Cricket World Cup Challenge League A tournament on 16 September 2019.
