= Norwegian Cricket Federation =

Cricket-administering body of Norway

The Norwegian Cricket Board is the official governing body of the sport of cricket in Norway. Its headquarters is located in Oslo, Norway. Norwegian Cricket Board is Norway's representative at the International Cricket Council and is an associate member and has been a member of that body since 2000. It is also a member of ICC Europe (earlier the European Cricket Council).

== See also ==
- Norway national cricket team
- Norway women's national cricket team
