= 2018 ICC World Cricket League Division Three =

International cricket tournament

- Dates: 9 – 19 November 2018
- Administrator: International Cricket Council
- Cricket format: Limited-overs (50 overs)
- Tournament format: Round-robin
- Host: Oman
- Champions: Oman
- Participants: 6
- Matches: 15
- Player of the series: (Oman) Bilal Khan
- Most runs: (Denmark) Hamid Shah (241)
- Most wickets: (Oman) Bilal Khan (12)

The 2018 ICC World Cricket League Division Three was an international cricket tournament that took place in Oman between 9 and 19 November 2018. It formed part of the 2017–19 cycle of the World Cricket League (WCL) which would determine the qualification for the 2023 Cricket World Cup. The top two teams were promoted to the 2019 ICC World Cricket League Division Two tournament, and the other four teams went on to play in the 2019–21 ICC Cricket World Cup Challenge League. It was the first international cricket tournament to be held in Oman.

Tournament hosts Oman were the first team to be promoted to Division Two for 2019 for 2019, after winning their opening four matches. Oman also won the tournament, after finishing unbeaten in all five of their fixtures. It was the first time this had happened in the WCL since Jersey won the Division Five tournament in 2014. The United States were the other team to be promoted, after they beat Singapore in the final match of the tournament. It was the first time that the United States had gained promotion to Division Two of the WCL.

== Teams ==
Six teams qualified for the tournament:

- Oman (5th in 2018 ICC World Cricket League Division Two)
- Kenya (6th in 2018 ICC World Cricket League Division Two)
- Singapore (3rd in 2017 ICC World Cricket League Division Three)
- United States (4th in 2017 ICC World Cricket League Division Three)
- Uganda (1st in 2018 ICC World Cricket League Division Four)
- Denmark (2nd in 2018 ICC World Cricket League Division Four)

== Preparation ==
Kenya and Uganda took part in the 2018 Africa T20 Cup in September in South Africa. Both sides remained in the country after the tournament ended, playing warm-up fixtures to prepare for the WCL. Kenya played matches against KwaZulu-Natal Inland and Uganda faced the South African Academy in 50-over matches. Kenya also played limited overs fixtures against the Marylebone Cricket Club (MCC), who toured the country in October 2018. The Kenyan team had threatened to boycott the tournament in a row over funding, but payment was made to the players just prior to the start of the competition. The United States took part in the 2018–19 Regional Super50 tournament in the West Indies.

== Squads ==
Denmark Coach: Jeremy Bray	Kenya Coach: David Obuya	Oman Coach: Duleep Mendis
Hamid Shah (c); Saif Ahmad; Taranjit Bharaj; Anders Bülow; Abdul Hashmi; Jonas Henriksen; Mads Henriksen; Jino Jojo; Zahmeer Khan; Frederik Klokker; Nicolaj Laegsgaard; Basit Raja; Bashir Shah; ~~Shangeev Thanikaithasan~~; Anique Uddin	~~Collins Obuya (c)~~; Shem Ngoche (c); Sachin Bhudia; Emmanuel Bundi; Dhiren Gondaria; Narendra Kalyan; Irfan Karim; Jasraj Kundi; Pushpak Kerai; Gerard Muthui; Alex Obanda; Nelson Odhiambo; Rakep Patel; Gurdeep Singh	Zeeshan Maqsood (c); Khawar Ali (vc); Twinkal Bhandari; Fayyaz Butt; Nestor Dhamba; Aqib Ilyas; Kaleemullah; Bilal Khan; Mehran Khan; Suraj Kumar; Sufyan Mehmood; Mohammad Nadeem; Jay Odedra; Badal Singh; Jatinder Singh
Singapore Coaches: Bilal Asad and Fahad Masood	Uganda Coach: Steve Tikolo	United States Coach: Pubudu Dassanayake
Chetan Suryawanshi (c); Aahan Gopinath Achar; Aritra Dutta; Rezza Gaznavi; Anantha Krishna; Amjad Mahboob; Arjun Mutreja; Anish Paraam; Janak Prakash; Rohan Rangarajan; Sidhant Singh; Manpreet Singh; Abhiraj Singh; Karthik Subramanian	Roger Mukasa (c); Brian Masaba (vc); Irfan Afridi; Bilal Hassan; Hamu Kayondo; Deusdedit Muhumuza; Dinesh Nakrani; Frank Nsubuga; Arnold Otwani (wk); Ronak Patel; Riazat Ali Shah; Henry Ssenyondo; Charles Waiswa; Kenneth Waiswa	Saurabh Netravalkar (c); Jaskaran Malhotra (vc, wk); Alex Amsterdam; Elmore Hutchinson; Aaron Jones; Nosthush Kenjige; Ali Khan; Jannisar Khan; Monank Patel; Nisarg Patel; Timil Patel; Roy Silva; ~~Sunny Sohal~~; Steven Taylor; Hayden Walsh Jr.

Ibrahim Khaleel was dropped as the captain of the United States squad and replaced by Saurabh Netravalkar. Sunny Sohal was ruled out of the tournament with an injury and was replaced by Nisarg Patel in the United States' squad. Ahead of the tournament, Collins Obuya was ruled out of Kenya's squad due to personal commitments. He was replaced by Narendra Kalyan, with Shem Ngoche named as captain of the team. Twinkal Bhandari was added to Oman's squad, replacing Khawar Ali, who suffered an injury during Oman's match with Denmark.

== Points table ==
Pos	Team	Pld	W	L	T	NR	Pts	NRR	
1	Oman (H)	5	5	0	0	0	10	0.927	Promoted to Division Two for 2019
2	United States	5	4	1	0	0	8	1.380	Promoted to Division Two for 2019
3	Singapore	5	2	3	0	0	4	−0.093	Relegated to ICC Cricket World Cup Challenge League
4	Kenya	5	2	3	0	0	4	−0.750	Relegated to ICC Cricket World Cup Challenge League
5	Denmark	5	1	4	0	0	2	−0.663	Relegated to ICC Cricket World Cup Challenge League
6	Uganda	5	1	4	0	0	2	−0.904	Relegated to ICC Cricket World Cup Challenge League

(H) Host

== Fixtures ==
The following fixtures were confirmed in October 2018.

9 November 2018
09:30
Scorecard

Kenya; 164 (49.2 overs)	v	Oman; 166/5 (42.5 overs)

Oman won by 5 wickets
Al Emarat Cricket Stadium, Muscat

- Kenya won the toss and elected to bat.

9 November 2018
09:30
Scorecard

Denmark; 165 (44.4 overs)	v	Uganda; 167/5 (36.2 overs)

Uganda won by 5 wickets
Al Emarat Cricket Stadium, Muscat

- Denmark won the toss and elected to bat.

10 November 2018
09:30
Scorecard

United States; 252/6 (50 overs)	v	Uganda; 198/9 (50 overs)

United States won by 54 runs
Al Emarat Cricket Stadium, Muscat

- Uganda won the toss and elected to field.

10 November 2018
09:30
Scorecard

Singapore; 185/9 (50 overs)	v	Oman; 186/6 (37.3 overs)

Oman won by 4 wickets
Al Emarat Cricket Stadium, Muscat

- Oman won the toss and elected to field.

12 November 2018
09:30
Scorecard

United States; 253 (50 overs)	v	Kenya; 96 (26 overs)

United States won by 158 runs
Al Emarat Cricket Stadium, Muscat

- Kenya won the toss and elected to field.
- This was the first win for the United States against Kenya.

12 November 2018
09:30
Scorecard

Singapore; 254 (49.3 overs)	v	Denmark; 160 (35.4 overs)

Singapore won by 94 runs
Al Emarat Cricket Stadium, Muscat

- Denmark won the toss and elected to field.

13 November 2018
09:30
Scorecard

Denmark; 154 (41.4 overs)	v	Oman; 155/7 (47.2 overs)

Oman won by 3 wickets
Al Emarat Cricket Stadium, Muscat

- Denmark won the toss and elected to bat.

13 November 2018
09:30
Scorecard

Uganda; 177/9 (50 overs)	v	Kenya; 178/4 (45.5 overs)

Kenya won by 6 wickets
Al Emarat Cricket Stadium, Muscat

- Uganda won the toss and elected to bat.

15 November 2018
09:30
Scorecard

Singapore; 204 (49.4 overs)	v	Uganda; 141 (42 overs)

Singapore won by 63 runs
Al Emarat Cricket Stadium, Muscat

- Uganda won the toss and elected to field.

15 November 2018
09:30
Scorecard

United States; 230/7 (50 overs)	v	Denmark; 214 (49.3 overs)

United States won by 16 runs
Al Emarat Cricket Stadium, Muscat

- Denmark won the toss and elected to field.

16 November 2018
09:30
Scorecard

United States; 213/8 (50 overs)	v	Oman; 214/6 (49.3 overs)

Oman won by 4 wickets
Al Emarat Cricket Stadium, Muscat

- Oman won the toss and elected to field.

16 November 2018
09:30
Scorecard

Kenya; 324/9 (50 overs)	v	Singapore; 312 (49.3 overs)

Kenya won by 12 runs
Al Emarat Cricket Stadium, Muscat

- Kenya won the toss and elected to bat.

18 November 2018
09:30
Scorecard

Kenya; 216 (49 overs)	v	Denmark; 218/1 (45.3 overs)

Denmark won by 9 wickets
Al Emarat Cricket Stadium, Muscat

- Denmark won the toss and elected to field.

18 November 2018
09:30
Scorecard

Uganda; 59 (28.3 overs)	v	Oman; 63/0 (17.2 overs)

Oman won by 10 wickets
Al Emarat Cricket Stadium, Muscat

- Uganda won the toss and elected to bat.

19 November 2018
09:30
Scorecard

Singapore; 161 (43.1 overs)	v	United States; 162/5 (25.5 overs)

United States won by 5 wickets
Al Emarat Cricket Stadium, Muscat

- United States won the toss and elected to field.
