= Rizwan Mahmood =

Danish cricketer (born 1989)

Personal information
- Full name: Rizwan Tariq Mahmood
- Born: 16 June 1989 (age 37); Århus, Denmark
- Batting: Right-handed
- Relatives: Kamran Mahmood (brother)

International information
- National side: Denmark (2008–present)
- T20I debut (cap 12): 17 June 2019 v Norway
- Last T20I: 1 July 2022 v Belgium
- T20I shirt no.: 55

Career statistics
Competition	List A	Twenty20
Matches	8	25
Runs scored	69	321
Batting average	8.62	16.89
100s/50s	0/0	0/1
Top score	18	65*
Catches/stumpings	0/–	6/–
- Source: Cricinfo, 16 July 2022

Rizwan Tariq Mahmood (born 16 June 1989) is a Danish cricketer, who has played for Denmark's national cricket team. A right-handed batsman, Mahmood was born at Århus. His younger brother, Kamran, also plays for Denmark.

== Career ==
Having represented Denmark at the Under-19 level, Mahmood made his full debut for the national team in a friendly against the Netherlands at Svanholm Park, Brøndby, in 2008. He was later selected as part of Denmark's squad for the 2009 World Cup Qualifier in South Africa, making his List A debut during the tournament against the Netherlands. He made three further appearances during the qualifier, the last of which came against Oman. He scored 36 runs during the tournament, at an average of 9.00, with a high score of 14.

Mahmmod was selected for Denmark's squad for the 2011 World Cricket League Division Three in Hong Kong, making six appearances during the tournament, before later that year playing in the European T20 Championship Division One which was held in Jersey and Guernsey. In March 2012, Denmark took part in the World Twenty20 Qualifier in the United Arab Emirates, having qualified for the event by winning the European T20 Championship. Mahmmod was selected in Denmark's fourteen-man squad for the qualifier, making his Twenty20 debut against Bermuda at the Sharjah Cricket Association Stadium. He made seven further appearances during the competition, the last of which came against Oman, scoring 140 runs at an average of 23.33, with a high score of 65 not out. This score came against Canada.

In August 2012, he was included in Denmark's fourteen-man squad for the World Cricket League Division Four in Malaysia. In March 2018, he was named in Denmark's squad for the 2018 ICC World Cricket League Division Four tournament, also in Malaysia.

In May 2019, he was named in Denmark's squad for a five-match series against Leinster Lightning in Ireland, in preparation for the Regional Finals of the 2018–19 ICC T20 World Cup Europe Qualifier tournament in Guernsey. The same month, he was named in Denmark's squad for the Regional Finals qualification tournament. He made his Twenty20 International (T20I) debut against Norway, on 17 June 2019.

In August 2019, he was named in Denmark's squad for the 2019 Malaysia Cricket World Cup Challenge League A tournament.
