= Twinkal Bhandari =

Indian-born cricketer (born 1987)

Personal information
- Full name: Twinkal Bhandari
- Born: October 16, 1987 (age 39); Vapi, Gujarat, India

International information
- National side: Oman
- Source: Cricinfo, 18 November 2018

Twinkal Bhandari is an Indian-born cricketer who plays for the Oman national cricket team. In October 2018, he was named in Oman's squad for the 2018 ICC World Cricket League Division Three tournament in Oman. During the tournament, he played in Oman's fixtures against the United States and Uganda.

In December 2018, he was named in Oman's team for the 2018 ACC Emerging Teams Asia Cup. He made his List A debut for Oman against Scotland on 19 February 2019, following the 2018–19 Oman Quadrangular Series.
