= Zishan Shah =

Danish cricketer (born 1987)

Personal information
- Born: 1 October 1987 (age 39); Brøndby, Denmark
- Batting: Right-handed
- Bowling: Right-arm medium

International information
- National side: Denmark (2005-2019)
- T20I debut (cap 11): 16 June 2019 v Jersey
- Last T20I: 20 June 2019 v Italy
- T20I shirt no.: 48

Career statistics
Competition	T20I	List A
Matches	6	7
Runs scored	88	30
Batting average	22.00	7.50
100s/50s	0/1	0/0
Top score	50	12
Balls bowled	–	60
Wickets	–	2
Bowling average	–	25.50
5 wickets in innings	–	0
10 wickets in match	–	0
Best bowling	–	1/16
Catches/stumpings	2/–	1/–
- Source: ESPNcricinfo, 18 February 2023

Zishan Shah (born 1 October 1987) is a Danish cricketer who played for Denmark in the 2005 ICC Trophy. He was born at Brøndby in 1987.

== Career ==
In May 2019, Shah was named in Denmark's squad for the Regional Finals of the 2018–19 ICC T20 World Cup Europe Qualifier tournament in Guernsey. He made his Twenty20 International (T20I) debut, against Jersey, on 16 June 2019.

In August 2019, he was named in Denmark's squad for the 2019 Malaysia Cricket World Cup Challenge League A tournament.
