= Hamid Shah =

Danish cricketer (born 1992)

Personal information
- Full name: Hamid Ali Mazhar Shah
- Born: 2 August 1992 (age 34); Brøndby, Denmark
- Batting: Right-handed
- Bowling: Right-arm off break

International information
- National side: Denmark (2019–present)
- T20I debut (cap 10): 16 June 2019 v Jersey
- Last T20I: 28 August 2024 v Guernsey
- T20I shirt no.: 63

Career statistics
Competition	T20I	LA	T20
Matches	32	19	39
Runs scored	1,026	739	1,116
Batting average	34.20	38.89	31.00
100s/50s	1/8	1/5	1/8
Top score	100	138	100
Balls bowled	281	534	347
Wickets	22	12	25
Bowling average	12.50	35.33	14.80
5 wickets in innings	–	–	–
10 wickets in match	–	–	–
Best bowling	4/19	3/37	4/19
Catches/stumpings	17/–	4/–	20/–
- Source: ESPNcricinfo, 7 October 2024

Hamid Ali Mazhar Shah (born 2 August 1992) is a Danish cricketer, who plays for Denmark's national cricket team. He made his debut for the Danish national side in July 2010. He is a right-handed all-rounder who bowls off spin.

== Career ==
Born in Brøndby, before making his senior debut for the national team, Shah played for Denmark at the under-13, under-15, under-17, and under-19 levels, as well as for Denmark A. His senior debut came in the 2010 European Cricket Championship Division One tournament in Jersey, with his highest score from three matches at the tournament being 37 from 81 balls against Scotland A. Against Norway in the final of the 2011 Nordic Cup, a 20-over tournament hosted by Denmark, Shah topscored with 40 runs out of a team total of 107. Earlier in the tournament, against Finland, he was named man of the match for scoring 53 not out and taking 2/18. At the 2011 European T20 Championship, beginning shortly after the Nordic Cup, he played in all seven matches, having little batting success but taking seven wickets in 12 overs.

Shah had an outstanding 2012 season for Svanholm Kricketklub, his club side in the Danish Cricket League, and was named man of the match in four out of his 14 matches. He finished fifth in the competition in terms of runs scored (behind only Zishan Shah for Svanholm), and was also his team's fourth-highest wicket-taker (behind Sair Anjum, Bobby Chawla, and Henrik Hansen. Shah was consequently named in Denmark's squad for the 2012 World Cricket League Division Four tournament in Malaysia. He played only four matches there, but was Denmark's best bowler against both Nepal and Malaysia, with figures of 2/35 and 3/41, respectively. Shah switched clubs for the 2013 domestic season, playing for Kjøbenhavns Boldklub instead of Svanholm. At the 2013 European T20 Championship, he took 10 wickets in seven games, with a best of 4/25 against France.

Denmark placed second to Italy at the European T20 Championship, and subsequently qualified for the 2013 World Twenty20 Qualifier in the United Arab Emirates. Matches at the tournament had full Twenty20 status, and Shah made his Twenty20 debut in the opening match against Nepal. He top scored in that game with 18 from a team total of 79, and was also Denmark's leading run scorer against Bermuda, where he made 31 from 30 balls. His only wickets of the tournament came against the United States in the 15th-place playoff, where he took 3/20 from his four overs. At Denmark's next major tournament after the World Twenty20 Qualifier, the 2014 WCL Division Four tournament in Singapore, Shah took only a single wicket, in the third-place playoff against Italy. However, he was still named player of the match, after an innings of 52 in a 92-run opening stand with Zameer Khan. His sole wicket had been that of Michael Raso, which ended a 97-run partnership for the fifth wicket with Alessandro Bonora.

In March 2018, he was named the captain of Denmark's squad for the 2018 ICC World Cricket League Division Four tournament in Malaysia. In September 2018, he was again named captain of Denmark's squad, this time for the 2018 ICC World Cricket League Division Three tournament in Oman. He was the leading run-scorer in the tournament, with 241 runs in five matches.

In May 2019, he was named in Denmark's squad for a five-match series against Leinster Lightning in Ireland, in preparation for the Regional Finals of the 2018–19 ICC T20 World Cup Europe Qualifier tournament in Guernsey. The same month, he was named as captain of Denmark's squad for the Regional Finals qualification tournament. He made his Twenty20 International (T20I) debut, against Jersey, on 16 June 2019.

In August 2019, Shah was named as the captain of Denmark's squad for the 2019 Malaysia Cricket World Cup Challenge League A tournament. He made his List A debut, against Malaysia, in the Cricket World Cup Challenge League A tournament on 16 September 2019. He finished the tournament as the leading run-scorer for Denmark, with 191 runs in five matches.

On 8 May 2022, he became the second player to be dismissed on 99 in a T20I when he was run out off the final ball of Denmark's innings against Finland.

Shah scored his maiden List A century against Canada at Maple Leaf Cricket Club on 5 August 2022, making 138 off 133 balls.

On 21 August 2024, Shah made his first T20I century, compiling exactly 100 off 58 balls in Denmark's opening T20 World Cup European sub-regional qualification tournament group match against the Czech Republic at King George V Sports Ground, Castel in Guernsey. He went on to be named player of the tournament after scoring 294 runs across five matches as Denmark finished runners-up.
