= Walid Ghauri =

Norwegian cricketer (born 1993)

Personal information
- Full name: Walid Ghauri
- Born: 12 May 1993 (age 33); Oslo, Norway
- Batting: Left-handed
- Bowling: Right-arm Medium

International information
- National side: Norway
- T20I debut (cap 10): 15 June 2019 v Italy
- Last T20I: 14 July 2024 v Jersey
- Source: Cricinfo, 7 June 2025

Walid Ghauri (born 12 May 1993) is a Norwegian cricketer who plays for the national team. In May 2019, he was named in Norway's squad for the Regional Finals of the 2018–19 ICC T20 World Cup Europe Qualifier tournament in Guernsey. He made his Twenty20 International (T20I) debut against Italy on 15 June 2019, and was named the man of the match, for his 35-ball unbeaten innings of 44 runs.
