= Daniel Weston =

German cricketer (born 1983)

Personal information
- Born: 11 March 1983 (age 43); Perth, Western Australia
- Batting: Left-handed
- Role: Wicket-keeper batter

International information
- National side: Germany
- T20I debut (cap 15): 11 May 2019 v Belgium
- Last T20I: 16 June 2019 v Italy
- Source: Cricinfo, 16 June 2019

Daniel Weston (born 11 March 1983) is a German cricketer. Born in Perth, Western Australia, he initially played cricket for that State alongside better-known players such as Shaun Marsh.

In 2004, he founded Westware Computers Pty Ltd, which built and supplied computer hardware and services to the education and corporate sector. He sold that business at the age of 23 before moving to Europe. In 2013, he founded the Aimed Global Alpha global macro hedge fund, domiciled in Luxembourg. In 2016, he founded German Cricket TV, an online video channel for supporting and promoting cricket in Germany.

He was named in Germany's squad for the 2017 ICC World Cricket League Division Five tournament in South Africa. He played in Germany's opening fixture, against Ghana, on 3 September 2017.

In August, 2018, Weston founded the European Cricket League, as the basis for the Champions League of Cricket in Europe. In September 2018, he was the leading run-scorer for Germany in Group A of the 2018–19 ICC World Twenty20 Europe Qualifier tournament. He was also named the player of the series, after scoring 180 runs, including three fifties, in five matches.

In May 2019, he was named in Germany's Twenty20 International (T20I) squad for their three-match series against Belgium. The matches were the first T20Is to be played by the German cricket team. He made his T20I debut for Germany against Belgium on 11 May 2019. Later the same month, he was named in Germany's squad for the Regional Finals of the 2018–19 ICC T20 World Cup Europe Qualifier tournament in Guernsey. However, during the tournament, he broke a finger and was replaced by Michael Richardson in Germany's squad.
