= Swedish cricket team in Finland in 2021 =

International cricket tour

Sweden cricket team in Finland in 2021
	Finland	Sweden
- Dates: 21 – 22 August 2021
Captains	Nathan Collins	Abhijit Venkatesh

Twenty20 International series
- Results: 4-match series drawn 2–2
Most runs	Nathan Collins (114)	Abhijit Venkatesh (115)
Most wickets	Amjad Sher (8)	Abhijit Venkatesh (7)

The Sweden cricket team toured Finland in August 2021 to play a four-match Twenty20 International (T20I) series. The matches were played at the Kerava National Cricket Ground in Kerava. Sweden travelled to Finland, having played a series against Denmark the previous weekend. The two series were the first international action with the Swedish national team for their coach, former South African international cricketer, Jonty Rhodes.

Finland took a 2–0 lead on the first day, before Sweden won both games on day two to share the series 2–2. Nathan Collins was the Finnish skipper while Abhijit Venkatesh captained Sweden.

== Squads ==
Finland	Sweden
Nathan Collins (c); Hariharan Dandapani; Peter Gallagher; Raaz Mohammad; Aravind Mohan; Vanraaj Padhaal; Aniketh Pusthay; Areeb Quadir; Ziaur Rehman; Jonathan Scamans (wk); Naveed Shahid; Amjad Sher; Adnan Syed; Mahesh Tambe	Abhijit Venkatesh (c); Wynand Boshoff (vc, wk); Qudratullah Mir Afzail; Baz Ayubi; Dipanjan Dey; Oktai Gholami; Rahul Gowthaman; Humayun Kabir; Liam Karlsson; Sami Khalil; Rahel Khan; Hassan Mahmood; Lemar Momand; Khalid Zahid; Imal Zuwak

== T20I series ==
=== 1st T20I ===
21 August 2021
10:30
Scorecard

Sweden; 135/6 (19 overs)	v	Finland; 139/6 (17.5 overs)
Abhijit Venkatesh 54 (41); Amjad Sher 2/12 (4 overs)		Nathan Collins 64* (45); Abhijit Venkatesh 3/13 (3 overs)

Finland won by 4 wickets
Kerava National Cricket Ground, Kerava
Umpires: Srinidhi Ravindra (Fin) and Jari Schabel (Fin)

- Sweden won the toss and elected to bat.
- The match was reduced to 19 overs per side due to rain.
- Raaz Mohammad, Naveed Shahid and Mahesh Tambe (Fin) all made their T20I debuts.

=== 2nd T20I ===
21 August 2021
15:00
Scorecard

Sweden; 141/8 (20 overs)	v	Finland; 142/6 (18.5 overs)
Dipanjan Dey 75* (49); Amjad Sher 3/14 (4 overs)		Amjad Sher 37* (15); Qudratullah Mir Afzail 3/28 (3.5 overs)

Finland won by 4 wickets
Kerava National Cricket Ground, Kerava
Umpires: Srinidhi Ravindra (Fin) and Sumanta Samanta (Fin)

- Sweden won the toss and elected to bat.

=== 3rd T20I ===
22 August 2021
10:30
Scorecard

Finland; 141/7 (20 overs)	v	Sweden; 113/7 (14 overs)
Aniketh Pusthay 56 (52); Oktai Gholami 2/23 (4 overs)		Khalid Zahid 47* (20); Peter Gallagher 3/29 (3 overs)

Sweden won by 3 wickets (DLS method)
Kerava National Cricket Ground, Kerava
Umpires: Sumanta Samanta (Fin) and Jari Schabel (Fin)

- Sweden won the toss and elected to field.
- Sweden were set a revised target of 110 runs from 15 overs due to rain.
- Adnan Syed (Fin) made his T20I debut.

=== 4th T20I ===
22 August 2021
15:00
Scorecard

Finland; 145/7 (20 overs)	v	Sweden; 146/4 (17.1 overs)
Amjad Sher 34 (19); Liam Karlsson 3/38 (4 overs)		Abhijit Venkatesh 43 (24); Aniketh Pusthay 1/4 (1 over)

Sweden won by 6 wickets
Kerava National Cricket Ground, Kerava
Umpires: Srinidhi Ravindra (Fin) and Sumanta Samanta (Fin)

- Sweden won the toss and elected to field.
