= Zameer Khan =

Danish cricketer (born 1990)

Personal information
- Full name: Zameer Khan
- Born: 17 September 1990 (age 36)
- Batting: Right-handed

International information
- National side: Denmark
- T20I debut (cap 19): 13 July 2019 v Finland
- Last T20I: 21 October 2021 v Jersey
- T20I shirt no.: 75
- Source: ESPNcricinfo, 21 October 2021

Zameer Khan (born 17 September 1990) is a Danish cricketer who plays for Denmark's national cricket team. He participated in the 2016 ICC World Cricket League Division Four tournament in October 2016. In March 2018, he was named in Denmark's squad for the 2018 ICC World Cricket League Division Four tournament held in Malaysia.

In September 2018, he was included in Denmark's squad for the 2018 ICC World Cricket League Division Three tournament in Oman. Khan made his Twenty20 International (T20I) debut against Finland on 13 July 2019 during a bilateral series.

In August 2019, he was selected for Denmark's squad in the 2019 Malaysia Cricket World Cup Challenge League A tournament, making his List A debut on 16 September 2019 against Malaysia, in the same tournament. In October 2021, Khan was named in Denmark's T20I squad for the Regional Final of the 2021 ICC Men's T20 World Cup Europe Qualifier tournament.
