= Omar Hayat =

Danish cricketer (born 1983)

Personal information
- Full name: Omar Hayat
- Born: 11 October 1983 (age 43); Copenhagen, Denmark
- Batting: Right-handed
- Bowling: Right-arm offbreak

International information
- National side: Denmark (2019-present)
- T20I debut (cap 14): 20 June 2019 v Guernsey
- Last T20I: 1 July 2022 v Belgium
- T20I shirt no.: 59
- Source: Cricinfo, 1 July 2022

Omar Hayat (born 11 October 1983) is a Danish cricketer.

== Career ==
In September 2016, he was named in Denmark's squad for the 2016 ICC World Cricket League Division Four tournament in the United States. He played in Denmark's fourth match of the tournament, against the United States. In May 2019, he was named in Denmark's squad for a five-match series against Leinster Lightning in Ireland, in preparation for the Regional Finals of the 2018–19 ICC T20 World Cup Europe Qualifier tournament in Guernsey. The same month, he was named in Denmark's squad for the Regional Finals qualification tournament. He made his Twenty20 International (T20I) debut, against Guernsey, on 20 June 2019.
