= Anique Uddin =

Danish cricketer (born 1997)

Personal information
- Full name: Anique Uddin
- Born: 19 September 1997 (age 29); Copenhagen, Denmark
- Batting: Right-handed
- Bowling: Right-arm offbreak

International information
- National side: Denmark (2019-present)
- T20I debut (cap 3): 16 June 2019 v Finland
- Last T20I: 19 May 2023 v Jersey
- T20I shirt no.: 81
- Source: Cricinfo, 27 August 2024

Anique Uddin (born 19 September 1997) is a Danish cricketer, who plays for the national cricket team. In April 2018, he was named in Denmark's squad for the 2018 ICC World Cricket League Division Four tournament in Malaysia. He played in Denmark's opening match of the tournament, against Bermuda.

In September 2018, he was named in Denmark's squad for the 2018 ICC World Cricket League Division Three tournament in Oman. In May 2019, he was part of Denmark's squad in a five-match series against Leinster Lightning in Ireland, in preparation for the Regional Finals of the 2018–19 ICC T20 World Cup Europe Qualifier tournament in Guernsey. The same month, he was named in Denmark's squad for the Regional Finals qualification tournament. He made his Twenty20 International (T20I) debut, against Jersey, on 16 June 2019.

In August 2019, he was named in Denmark's squad for the 2019 Malaysia Cricket World Cup Challenge League A tournament. He made his List A debut for Denmark, against Malaysia, in the Cricket World Cup Challenge League A tournament on 16 September 2019. In October 2021, he was named in Denmark's T20I squad for the Regional Final of the 2021 ICC Men's T20 World Cup Europe Qualifier tournament.
