= John Richardson (South African cricketer) =

South African cricketer (1935–2020)

John Henry Richardson (8 May 1935 – 8 May 2020) was a South African cricketer active from 1959 to 1961 who played for North Eastern Transvaal.

Born in Pretoria, Richardson appeared in twenty-two first-class matches as a right-hand batsman and wicketkeeper. He scored 785 runs with a highest score of 72.

His son Dave played Test cricket for South Africa in the 1990s.
