= 2018–19 Men's T20 World Cup Europe qualifier =

Cricket tournament

The 2018–19 ICC T20 World Cup Europe Qualifier was a cricket tournament that formed part of the qualification process for the 2021 ICC T20 World Cup. Twelve regional qualifiers were held by the International Cricket Council (ICC), with 62 teams (Note: Zambia were originally scheduled to compete in the Southern sub region group in the Africa Qualifier, but later withdrew.) competing during 2018 in five regions – Africa (3 groups), Americas (2), Asia (2), East Asia Pacific (2) and Europe (3). The top 25 sides from these progressed to five Regional Finals in 2019, with seven teams then going on to compete in the 2019 ICC T20 World Cup Qualifier, (Note: The United Arab Emirates initially qualified to the Asia Regional Final, but later automatically progressed to the qualifier tournament as the host.) along with the six lowest ranked sides from the ICC T20I Championship.

Eighteen countries from the European region competed in the initial phase of the tournament, divided into three groups of six each. Those matches took place in the Netherlands between 29 August and 2 September 2018. The top two teams in each group advanced to the ICC World T20 Europe Regional Finals in 2019. In April 2018, the International Cricket Council (ICC) granted full international status to Twenty20 men's matches played between member sides from 1 January 2019 onwards. Therefore, all the matches in the Regional Finals were played as Twenty20 Internationals (T20Is).

Three of the fixtures on day one of the qualifiers were abandoned because of rain. All three matches were replayed on the tournament's reserve day, 31 August 2018. Denmark and Germany qualified from Group A for the Regional Finals. They were joined by Italy and Jersey from Group B, and Norway and Guernsey from Group C.

The Regional Finals were held in Guernsey in June 2019. Jersey progressed to the T20 World Cup Qualifier after winning the Regional Finals. Jersey, which had finished level on points with Germany, advanced due to a better net run rate.

== Teams ==
Group A	Group B	Group C
Austria; Cyprus; Denmark; France; Germany; Portugal	Belgium; Finland; Isle of Man; Italy; Jersey; Spain	Czech Republic; Gibraltar; Guernsey; Israel; Norway; Sweden

== Group A ==
2018 ICC T20 World Cup Europe Qualifier, Group A
- Dates: 29 August – 2 September 2018
- Administrator: ICC Europe
- Cricket format: T20
- Tournament format: Round-robin
- Host: Netherlands
- Champions: Denmark
- Participants: 6
- Matches: 15
- Player of the series: (Germany) Daniel Weston
- Most runs: (Germany) Daniel Weston (180)
- Most wickets: (Austria) Waqar Zalmai (10)

=== Points table ===
Team	Pld	W	L	T	NR	Pts	NRR	Status
Denmark (Q)	5	5	0	0	0	10	+3.390	Advanced to Regional Finals
Germany (Q)	5	3	2	0	0	6	+2.527	Advanced to Regional Finals
Austria	5	3	2	0	0	6	+0.729	
France	5	2	3	0	0	4	–2.473	
Portugal	5	1	4	0	0	2	–0.804	
Cyprus	5	1	4	0	0	2	–2.446	

(Q) Qualified to Regional Finals

=== Fixtures ===
29 August 2018
11:00
Scorecard

Portugal; 118/3 (20 overs)	v	Austria; 119/4 (16.1 overs)
Tariq Aziz 32* (32); Imran Asif 2/24 (4 overs)		Bilal Zalmai 47 (34); Paolo Buccimazza 2/22 (4 overs)

Austria won by 6 wickets
Sportpark Het Schootsveld Ground 1, Deventer
Umpires: Naeem Ashraf (Eng) and Michael Foster (Ire)
Player of the match: Bilal Zalmai (Aut)

- Portugal won the toss and elected to bat.

29 August 2018
11:00
Scorecard

Germany; 179/7 (20 overs)	v	Cyprus; 70/9 (12 overs)
Amith Sarma 69 (52); Abdul Manan 2/29 (4 overs)		Shoaib Ahmed 26 (20); Abdul Shakoor 4/9 (3 overs)

Germany won by 46 runs (D/L method)
Sportpark Maarschalkerweerd, Utrecht
Umpires: Kent Pedersen (Den) and Richard Veillard (Gue)
Player of the match: Amith Sarma (Ger)

- Cyprus won the toss and elected to field.
- Cyprus were set a target of 117 runs from 12 overs due to rain.

29 August 2018
16:00
Scorecard

France; 103/7 (20 overs)	v	Austria; 104/2 (11.5 overs)
Noman Amjad 26 (19); Waqar Zalmai 3/33 (4 overs)		Shadnan Khan 42* (23); Mobashar Ashraf 1/12 (2 overs)

Austria won by 8 wickets
Sportpark Het Schootsveld Ground 1, Deventer
Umpires: Michael Foster (Ire) and Sue Redfern (Eng)
Player of the match: Shadnan Khan (Aut)

- France on the toss and elected to bat.

29 August 2018
16:00
Scorecard

Germany; 86/8 (20 overs)	v	Denmark; 25/0 (5.1 overs)
Rishi Pillai 22 (35); Shangeev Thanikaithasan 2/14 (3 overs)		Hamid Shah 18* (21)

Denmark won by 8 runs (D/L method)
Sportpark Maarschalkerweerd, Utrecht
Umpires: Adriaan van den Dries (Ned) and Richard Veillard (Gue)
Player of the match: Hamid Shah (Den)

- Germany won the toss and elected to bat.

30 August 2018
11:00
Scorecard

Denmark; 189/6 (20 overs)	v	Cyprus; 28 (18.3 overs)
Hamid Shah 78 (49); Abdul Manan 2/30 (4 overs)		Mohsin Raza 5 (5); Nicolaj Laegsgaard 3/5 (4 overs)

Denmark won by 161 runs
Sportpark Het Schootsveld Ground 1, Deventer
Umpires: Naeem Ashraf (Eng) and Michael Foster (Ire)
Player of the match: Hamid Shah (Den)

- Denmark won the toss and elected to bat.

30 August 2018
11:00
Scorecard

France; 114/8 (20 overs)	v	Portugal; 112/7 (20 overs)
Noman Naeem 32 (29); Tariq Aziz 3/19 (3 overs)		Tariq Aziz 48 (51); Mobashar Ashraf 2/25 (4 overs)

France won by 2 runs
Sportpark Maarschalkerweerd, Utrecht
Umpires: Kent Pedersen (Den) and Richard Veillard (Gue)
Player of the match: Tariq Aziz (Por)

- Portugal won the toss and elected to field.

30 August 2018
16:00
Scorecard

Denmark; 118 (19.5 overs)	v	Austria; 111 (20 overs)
Mads Henriksen 38 (39); Imran Asif 3/21 (4 overs)		Imran Asif 22 (24); Anders Bulow 2/13 (4 overs)

Denmark won by 7 runs
Sportpark Het Schootsveld Ground 1, Deventer
Umpires: Naeem Ashraf (Eng) and Adriaan van den Dries (Ned)
Player of the match: Mads Henriksen (Den)

- Denmark won the toss and elected to bat.

30 August 2018
16:00
Scorecard

Germany; 207/4 (20 overs)	v	France; 87/5 (20 overs)
Mudassar Muhammad 78 (50); Mobashar Ashraf 2/36 (3 overs)		Noman Amjad 32 (39); Talha Khan 1/5 (2 overs)

Germany won by 120 runs
Sportpark Maarschalkerweerd, Utrecht
Umpires: Kent Pedersen (Den) and Sue Redfern (Eng)

- France won the toss and elected to field.

1 September 2018
11:00
Scorecard

Portugal; 109/8 (20 overs)	v	Germany; 110/2 (15.2 overs)
Zohaib Sarwar 34 (24); Abdul Shakoor 2/13 (3 overs)		Daniel Weston 58* (44); Khalil Aziz 1/23 (2 overs)

Germany won by 8 wickets
Sportpark Het Schootsveld Ground 1, Deventer
Umpires: Sue Redfern (Eng) and Adriaan van den Dries (Ned)
Player of the match: Daniel Weston (Ger)

- Portugal won the toss and elected to bat.

1 September 2018
11:00
Scorecard

Cyprus; 147 (19.2 overs)	v	Austria; 139/9 (20 overs)
Shoaib Ahmed 60 (46); Waqar Zalmai 2/16 (4 overs)		Amar Naeem 59 (49); Azan Baig 3/20 (3 overs)

Cyprus won by 8 runs
Sportpark Het Schootsveld Ground 2, Deventer
Umpires: Michael Foster (Ire) and Kent Pedersen (Den)
Player of the match: Shoaib Ahmed (Cyp)

- Cyprus won the toss and elected to bat.

1 September 2018
16:00
Scorecard

Portugal; 81 (18.4 overs)	v	Denmark; 85/3 (15.1 overs)
Umar Farooq 28 (36); Saad Ahmad 4/17 (3 overs)		Anders Bulow 35 (34); Surinder Sharma 2/20 (4 overs)

Denmark won by 7 wickets
Sportpark Het Schootsveld Ground 1, Deventer
Umpires: Sue Redfern (Eng) and Richard Veillard (Gue)
Player of the match: Saad Ahmad (Den)

- Portugal won the toss and elected to bat.

1 September 2018
16:00
Scorecard

Cyprus; 113 (18.5 overs)	v	France; 114/6 (18.4 overs)
Azan Baig 20 (9); Paul Alam 3/15 (4 overs)		Noman Naeem 44 (45); Mangala Ketiyage 2/10 (2 overs)

France won by 4 wickets
Sportpark Het Schootsveld Ground 2, Deventer
Umpires: Naeem Ashraf (Eng) and Kent Pedersen (Den)

- Cyprus won the toss and elected to bat.

2 September 2018
11:00
Scorecard

Austria; 142/6 (20 overs)	v	Germany; 140/6 (20 overs)
Armaan Randhawa 42 (27); Ahmed Wardak 2/29 (4 overs)		Daniel Weston 51 (56); Waqar Zalmai 3/23 (4 overs)

Austria won by 2 runs
Sportpark Het Schootsveld Ground 1, Deventer
Umpires: Michael Foster (Ire) and Richard Veillard (Gue)
Player of the match: Armaan Randhawa (Aut)

- Austria won the toss and elected to bat.

2 September 2018
11:00
Scorecard

Denmark; 176/5 (20 overs)	v	France; 103/8 (20 overs)
Rizwan Mahmood 72 (50); Noman Amjad 2/43 (4 overs)		Jubaid Ahamed 27 (25); Oliver Hald 3/10 (4 overs)

Denmark won by 73 runs
Sportpark Het Schootsveld Ground 2, Deventer
Umpires: Naeem Ashraf (Eng) and Adriaan van den Dries (Ned)
Player of the match: Rizwan Mahmood (Den)

- Denmark won the toss and elected to bat.

2 September 2018
16:00
Scorecard

Cyprus; 114/8 (20 overs)	v	Portugal; 115/5 (18.1 overs)
Rafiqul Islam 24 (15); Paolo Buccimazza 2/15 (4 overs)		Arslan Ahmed 49 (34); Syed Hussain 2/23 (4 overs)

Portugal won by 5 wickets
Sportpark Het Schootsveld Ground 1, Deventer
Umpires: Adriaan van den Dries (Ned) and Richard Veillard (Gue)
Player of the match: Paolo Buccimazza (Por)

- Cyprus won the toss and elected to bat.

== Group B ==
2018 ICC T20 World Cup Europe Qualifier, Group B
- Dates: 29 August – 2 September 2018
- Administrator: ICC Europe
- Cricket format: T20
- Tournament format: Round-robin
- Host: Netherlands
- Champions: Italy
- Participants: 6
- Matches: 15
- Most runs: (Italy) Nicholas Maiolo (205)
- Most wickets: (Jersey) Ben Stevens (14)

=== Points table ===
Team	Pld	W	L	T	NR	Pts	NRR	Status
Italy (Q)	5	5	0	0	0	10	+1.696	Advanced to Regional Finals
Jersey (Q)	5	4	1	0	0	8	+2.113	Advanced to Regional Finals
Spain	5	2	3	0	0	4	–0.505	
Belgium	5	2	3	0	0	4	–0.806	
Finland	5	1	4	0	0	2	–1.276	
Isle of Man	5	1	4	0	0	2	–1.561	

(Q) Qualified to Regional Finals

=== Fixtures ===
29 August 2018
11:00
Scorecard

Italy; 147/9 (20 overs)	v	Spain; 115/6 (20 overs)
Nicholas Maiolo 41 (37); Atif Mehmood 4/21 (4 overs)		Paul Hennessy 40 (43); Michael Ross 2/17 (2 overs)

Italy won by 32 runs
Sportpark Duivesteijn, Voorburg
Umpires: Rizwan Akram (Ned) and Suthan Selvachandran (Jer)
Player of the match: Nicholas Maiolo (Ita)

- Spain won the toss and elected to field.

29 August 2018
11:00
Scorecard

Isle of Man; 121/4 (20 overs)	v	Belgium; 122/7 (19.4 overs)
Oliver Webster 42* (33); Ashiqullah Said 2/13 (4 overs)		Faisal Khaliq 23* (21); Chris Langford 2/18 (4 overs)

Belgium won by 3 wickets
VRA Cricket Ground, Amstelveen
Umpires: Rafi Ahmed (Ned) and Jesper Jensen (Den)
Player of the match: Ashiqullah Said (Bel)

- Isle of Man won the toss and elected to bat.

29 August 2018
16:00
Scorecard

Jersey; 112/8 (20 overs)	v	Italy; 113/5 (17.5 overs)
Julius Sumerauer 30 (29); Baljit Singh 2/11 (4 overs)		Jaspreet Singh 32 (23); Benjamin Ward 2/11 (2 overs)

Italy won by 5 wickets
Sportpark Duivesteijn, Voorburg
Umpires: Rizwan Akram (Ned) and Alex Dowdalls (Sco)
Player of the match: Jaspreet Singh (Ita)

- Italy won the toss and elected to field.

29 August 2018
16:00
Scorecard

Isle of Man; 136/5 (20 overs)	v	Finland; 34/3 (7 overs)
Nathan Knights 36 (33); Maneesh Chauhan 1/20 (4 overs); Nurul Huda 1/20 (4 overs)		Jonathan Scamans 18 (19); Nicholas White 1/4 (1 over)

Isle of Man won by 14 runs (D/L method)
VRA Cricket Ground, Amstelveen
Umpires: Jesper Jensen (Den) and Heath Kearns (Jer)
Player of the match: Nathan Knights (IoM)

- Finland won the toss and elected to field.
- Finland were set a revised target of 49 runs from 7 overs due to rain.

30 August 2018
11:00
Scorecard

Finland; 122 (19.4 overs)	v	Belgium; 126/7 (19.5 overs)
Nathan Collins 74 (63); Faisal Khaliq 4/9 (4 overs)		Shaheryar Butt 61 (48); Hariharan Dandapani 2/16 (3.5 overs)

Belgium won by 3 wickets
Sportpark Duivesteijn, Voorburg
Umpires: Rafi Ahmed (Ned) and Suthan Selvachandran (Jer)
Player of the match: Faisal Khaliq (Bel)

- Finland won the toss and elected to bat.

30 August 2018
11:00
Scorecard

Spain; 92/8 (20 overs)	v	Jersey; 93/0 (14.4 overs)
Yasir Ali 21 (30); Benjamin Ward 3/16 (4 overs)		Benjamin Ward 54* (46)

Jersey won by 10 wickets
VRA Cricket Ground, Amstelveen
Umpires: Rizwan Akram (Ned) and Simon Welch (Gue)
Player of the match: Benjamin Ward (Jer)

- Spain won the toss and elected to bat.

30 August 2018
16:00
Scorecard

Italy; 147/2 (20 overs)	v	Finland; 91 (18.5 overs)
Manpreet Singh 50 (38); Tonmoy Saha 1/27 (3 overs)		Aniketh Pusthay 21 (18); Madupa Fernando 4/22 (4 overs)

Italy won by 56 runs
Sportpark Duivesteijn, Voorburg
Umpires: Rafi Ahmed (Ned) and Surendiran Shanmugam (Eng)
Player of the match: Madupa Fernando (Ita)

- Italy won the toss and elected to bat.

30 August 2018
16:00
Scorecard

Jersey; 156/4 (20 overs)	v	Isle of Man; 102 (18.2 overs)
Ben Stevens 75 (55); Kieran Cawte 4/27 (4 overs)		Daniel Kniveton 23 (27); Harrison Carlyon 3/12 (3.2 overs)

Jersey won by 54 runs
VRA Cricket Ground, Amstelveen
Umpires: Andrew Baird (Sco) and Simon Welch (Gue)

- Jersey won the toss and elected to bat.

1 September 2018
11:00
Scorecard

Isle of Man; 87 (20 overs)	v	Spain; 89/4 (13.4 overs)
Oliver Webster 17 (18); Ravi Panchal 3/13 (4 overs)		Yasir Ali 30 (29); Chris Langford 2/18 (2.4 overs)

Spain won by 6 wickets
Hazelaarweg Stadion, Rotterdam
Umpires: Rakbir Hasan (Ita) and Philip Thompson (Ire)

- Isle of Man won the toss and elected to bat.

1 September 2018
11:00
Scorecard

Belgium; 141/9 (20 overs)	v	Italy; 144/4 (18.2 overs)
Mamoon Latif 39 (34); Rakibul Hasan 3/17 (4 overs)		Nicholas Maiolo 57* (42); Reyhan Faiz 2/33 (3 overs)

Italy won by 6 wickets
Sportpark Thurlede, Schiedam
Umpires: Andrew Baird (Sco) and Surendiran Shanmugam (Eng)
Player of the match: Nicholas Maiolo (Ita)

- Belgium won the toss and elected to bat.

1 September 2018
16:00
Scorecard

Finland; 119/6 (20 overs)	v	Spain; 91/9 (20 overs)
Nathan Collins 50 (50); Yasir Ali 2/14 (3 overs)		Yasir Ali 21 (33); Shoaib Qureshi 2/14 (4 overs)

Finland won by 28 runs
Hazelaarweg Stadion, Rotterdam
Umpires: Rakbir Hasan (Ita) and Suthan Selvachandran (Jer)

- Spain won the toss and elected to field.

1 September 2018
16:00
Scorecard

Belgium; 89 (19.5 overs)	v	Jersey; 90/2 (10.2 overs)
Abdul Rashid 22 (19); Ben Stevens 4/10 (4 overs)		Jonty Jenner 36* (41); Reyhan Faiz 1/14 (1 over)

Jersey won by 8 wickets
Sportpark Thurlede, Schiedam
Umpires: Alex Dowdalls (Sco) and Surendiran Shanmugam (Eng)
Player of the match: Ben Stevens (Jer)

- Belgium won the toss and elected to bat.

2 September 2018
11:00
Scorecard

Isle of Man; 113 (19.2 overs)	v	Italy; 114/2 (13.3 overs)
Nathan Knights 30 (16); Nicholas Maiolo 3/11 (4 overs)		Manpreet Singh 47 (39); Matthew Ansell 1/14 (4 overs)

Italy won by 8 wickets
Hazelaarweg Stadion, Rotterdam
Umpires: Andrew Baird (Sco) and Surendiran Shanmugam (Eng)
Player of the match: Nicholas Maiolo (Ita)

- Italy won the toss and elected to field.

2 September 2018
11:00
Scorecard

Jersey; 130/8 (20 overs)	v	Finland; 66 (15.3 overs)
Jonty Jenner 40 (28); Hariharan Dandapani 3/19 (4 overs)		Peter Gallagher 11 (8); Ben Kynman 4/10 (2.3 overs)

Jersey won by 64 runs
Sportpark Thurlede, Schiedam
Umpires: Rizwan Akram (Ned) and Mary Waldron (Ire)
Player of the match: Benjamin Ward (Jer)

- Jersey won the toss and elected to bat.

2 September 2018
16:00
Scorecard

Belgium; 126/6 (20 overs)	v	Spain; 127/6 (19.1 overs)
Shaheryar Butt 46* (44); Yasir Ali 2/18 (3 overs)		Yasir Ali 40 (45); Shaheryar Butt 2/26 (4 overs)

Spain won by 4 wickets
Hazelaarweg Stadion, Rotterdam
Umpires: Andrew Baird (Sco) and Heath Kearns (Jer)
Player of the match: Yasir Ali (Esp)

- Belgium won the toss and elected to bat.

== Group C ==
2018 ICC T20 World Cup Europe Qualifier, Group C
- Dates: 29 August – 2 September 2018
- Administrator: ICC Europe
- Cricket format: T20
- Tournament format: Round-robin
- Host: Netherlands
- Champions: Norway
- Participants: 6
- Matches: 15
- Most runs: (Gibraltar) Balaji Pai (183)
- Most wickets: (Guernsey) Anthony Stokes (14)

=== Points table ===
Team	Pld	W	L	T	NR	Pts	NRR	Status
Norway (Q)	5	5	0	0	0	10	+2.356	Advanced to Regional Finals
Guernsey (Q)	5	4	1	0	0	8	+2.085	Advanced to Regional Finals
Sweden	5	3	2	0	0	6	+0.203	
Israel	5	1	4	0	0	2	–0.438	
Czech Republic	5	1	4	0	0	2	–1.904	
Gibraltar	5	1	4	0	0	2	–2.273	

(Q) Qualified to Regional Final

=== Fixtures ===
29 August 2018
11:00
Scorecard

Gibraltar; 70 (18.5 overs)	v	Guernsey; 76/0 (10.5 overs)
Balaji Pai 33 (35); William Peatfield 3/11 (3.5 overs)		Lucas Barker 52* (37)

Guernsey won by 10 wickets
Hazelaarweg Stadion, Rotterdam
Umpires: Rakbir Hasan (Ita) and Surendiran Shanmugam (Eng)
Player of the match: Lucas Barker (Gue)

- Guernsey won the toss and elected to field.

29 August 2018
11:00
Scorecard

Czech Republic; 111/8 (20 overs)	v	Sweden; 112/4 (18.1 overs)
Hilal Ahmad 26 (24); Azam Khalil 3/13 (4 overs)		Bilal Zaigham 41* (52); Sudesh Wickramasekara 2/9 (4 overs)

Sweden won by 6 wickets
Sportpark Thurlede, Schiedam
Umpires: Philip Thompson (Ire) and Simon Welch (Gue)
Player of the match: Bilal Zaigham (Swe)

- Sweden won the toss and elected to field.

29 August 2018
16:00
Scorecard

Israel; 161/7 (20 overs)	v	Gibraltar; 109/8 (20 overs)
Emanuel Solomon 70 (31); Balaji Pai 3/34 (4 overs)		Matthew Hunter 41* (45); Yair Nagavkar 2/13 (3 overs)

Israel won by 52 runs
Hazelaarweg Stadion, Rotterdam
Umpires: Surendiran Shanmugam (Eng) and Mary Waldron (Ire)
Player of the match: Emanuel Solomon (Isr)

- Gibraltar won the toss and elected to field.

29 August 2018
16:00
Scorecard

Norway; 150/6 (20 overs)	v	Sweden; 94 (18.4 overs)
Ansar Iqbal 39 (29); Azam Khalil 2/18 (4 overs)		Sabir Zahoor 31 (30); Hayatullah Niazi 3/7 (4 overs)

Norway won by 56 runs
Sportpark Thurlede, Schiedam
Umpires: Andrew Baird (Sco) and Philip Thompson (Ire)
Player of the match: Hayatullah Niazi (Nor)

- Sweden won the toss and elected to field.

30 August 2018
11:00
Scorecard

Czech Republic; 41/9 (9 overs)	v	Norway; 42/0 (5.2 overs)
Arshad Hayat 9* (11); Hayatullah Niazi 3/9 (2 overs)		Raza Iqbal 26* (22)

Norway won by 10 wickets
Hazelaarweg Stadion, Rotterdam
Umpires: Jesper Jensen (Den) and Mary Waldron (Ire)
Player of the match: Raza Iqbal (Nor)

- Norway won the toss and elected to field.
- The match was reduced to 9 overs per side due to rain.

30 August 2018
11:00
Scorecard

Israel; 79/8 (20 overs)	v	Guernsey; 80/3 (15.1 overs)
Eshkol Solomon 26 (32); Anthony Stokes 3/18 (4 overs)		Luke Le Tissier 33* (35); Roshan Guruge 2/23 (4 overs)

Guernsey won by 7 wickets
Sportpark Thurlede, Schiedam
Umpires: Heath Kearns (Jer) and lPhilip Thompson (Ire)
Player of the match: Anthony Stokes (Gue)

- Guernsey won the toss and elected to field.

30 August 2018
16:00
Scorecard

Gibraltar; 58 (18.2 overs)	v	Norway; 62/1 (9.1 overs)
Balaji Pai 16 (17); Raza Iqbal 3/7 (4 overs)		Abdullah Sheikh 35* (28); Richard Hatchman 1/14 (2 overs)

Norway won by 9 wickets
Hazelaarweg Stadion, Rotterdam
Umpires: Alex Dowdalls (Sco) and Mary Waldron (Ire)
Player of the match: Abdullah Sheikh (Nor)

- Norway won the toss and elected to field.

30 August 2018
16:00
Scorecard

Sweden; 142/8 (20 overs)	v	Israel; 102/8 (20 overs)
Waqas Haider 30 (18); Raphael Schachat 3/30 (4 overs)		Shailesh Bangera 22 (19); Azam Mohammad 3/14 (4 overs)

Sweden won by 40 runs
Sportpark Thurlede, Schiedam
Umpires: Rakbir Hasan (Ita) and Heath Kearns (Jer)
Player of the match: Azam Mohammad (Swe)

- Israel won the toss and elected to field.

1 September 2018
11:00
Scorecard

Sweden; 107 (20 overs)	v	Guernsey; 111/4 (19.3 overs)
Abhijit Venkatesh 24 (35); Luke Le Tissier 3/16 (4 overs)		Josh Butler 52* (45); Wakil Jalali 3/18 (4 overs)

Guernsey won by 6 wickets
Sportpark Duivesteijn, Voorburg
Umpires: Rizwan Akram (Ned) and Mary Waldron (Ire)
Player of the match: Josh Butler (Swe)

- Sweden won the toss and elected to bat.

1 September 2018
11:00
Scorecard

Czech Republic; 117/9 (20 overs)	v	Gibraltar; 120/2 (19.1 overs)
Hilal Ahmad 23 (18); Balaji Pai 5/22 (4 overs)		Balaji Pai 75* (58); Naveed Ahmed 1/17 (4 overs)

Gibraltar won by 8 wickets
VRA Cricket Ground, Amstelveen
Umpires: Jesper Jensen (Den) and Simon Welch (Gue)
Player of the match: Balaji Pai (Gib)

- Gibraltar won the toss and elected to field.

1 September 2018
16:00
Scorecard

Guernsey; 90/7 (20 overs)	v	Norway; 91/5 (16.3 overs)
Tom Nightingale 31 (35); Ansar Iqbal 3/20 (4 overs)		Suhail Iftikhar 29 (41); Anthony Stokes 3/18 (4 overs)

Norway won by 5 wickets
Sportpark Duivesteijn, Voorburg
Umpires: Rizwan Akram (Ned) and Heath Kearns (Jer)

- Guernsey won the toss and elected to bat.

1 September 2018
16:00
Scorecard

Israel; 112/6 (20 overs)	v	Czech Republic; 113/6 (20 overs)
Eshkol Solomon 50 (47); Sameera Waththage 4/17 (4 overs)		Arun Ashokan 37 (25); Josh Evans 2/23 (4 overs)

Czech Republic won by 4 wickets
VRA Cricket Ground, Amstelveen
Umpires: Rafi Ahmed (Ned) and Jesper Jensen (Den)

- Czech Republic won the toss and elected to field.

2 September 2018
11:00
Scorecard

Sweden; 149/6 (20 overs)	v	Gibraltar; 118/4 (20 overs)
Raz Ahsik Imtiaz 72* (49); Charles Harrison 2/21 (4 overs)		Balaji Pai 46 (41); Usman Arif 1/13 (4 overs)

Sweden won by 31 runs
Sportpark Duivesteijn, Voorburg
Umpires: Alex Dowdalls (Sco) and Simon Welch (Gue)
Player of the match: Raz Ahsik Imtiaz (Swe)

- Gibraltar won the toss and elected to field.

2 September 2018
11:00
Scorecard

Norway; 143 (19.5 overs)	v	Israel; 119 (18.3 overs)
Pratik Agnihotri 38 (43); Tomer Kahamker 5/25 (4 overs)		Josh Evans 32 (30); Raza Iqbal 3/15 (3.3 overs)

Norway won by 24 runs
VRA Cricket Ground, Amstelveen
Umpires: Rakbir Hasan (Ita) and Suthan Selvachandran (Jer)
Player of the match: Tomer Kahamker (Isr)

- Israel won the toss and elected to field.

2 September 2018
16:00
Scorecard

Guernsey; 181/4 (20 overs)	v	Czech Republic; 59 (15.5 overs)
Matthew Stokes 80 (53); Sudesh Wickramasekara 2/25 (4 overs)		Sumit Pokhriyal 22 (37); Anthony Stokes 4/10 (4 overs)

Guernsey won by 122 runs
Sportpark Duivesteijn, Voorburg
Umpires: Alex Dowdalls (Sco) and Philip Thompson (Ire)
Player of the match: Matthew Stokes (Gue)

- Czech Republic won the toss and elected to field.

== Regional Finals ==
2019 ICC T20 World Cup Europe Regional Finals
- Dates: 15 – 20 June 2019
- Administrator: ICC Europe
- Cricket format: Twenty20 International
- Tournament format: Round-robin
- Host: Guernsey
- Champions: Jersey
- Runners-up: Germany
- Participants: 6
- Matches: 17
- Player of the series: (Germany) Craig Meschede
- Most runs: (Germany) Craig Meschede (179)
- Most wickets: (Italy) Baljit Singh (10) (Jersey) Anthony Hawkins-Kay (10)

The Regional Finals took place in Guernsey from 15 to 20 June 2019. Germany announced their squad for the finals on 14 May 2019, which included three players (Ollie Rayner, Craig Meschede and Dieter Klein) with experience playing for county teams in English domestic cricket, although only Meschede joined up with the final squad. On 31 May 2019, the ICC confirmed all of the squads for the Regional Finals. During the tournament, Michael Richardson, who has also played in English domestic cricket, was added to Germany's squad, replacing the injured Daniel Weston.

At the mid-point of the Regional Final, Jersey and Italy had pulled clear from the other teams, both recording three wins from three matches. All four fixtures scheduled to take place on 18 June were washed out, with them being moved to the reserve day on 20 June. On the last day of fixtures, Jersey won the group to advance to the 2019 ICC T20 World Cup Qualifier, despite losing to Germany in the last match of the Regional Finals, progressing due to a superior net run rate.

Qualified Teams
Group A	Denmark
Group A	Germany
Group B	Italy
Group B	Jersey
Group C	Norway
Group C	Guernsey

=== Points table ===
Pos	Team	Pld	W	L	T	NR	Pts	NRR	
1	Jersey	5	4	1	0	0	8	1.802	Qualify to 2019 Men's T20 World Cup Qualifier
2	Germany	5	4	1	0	0	8	1.749	
3	Italy	5	3	2	0	0	6	−0.687	
4	Denmark	5	2	3	0	0	4	0.171	
5	Guernsey (H)	5	2	3	0	0	4	−0.626	
6	Norway	5	0	5	0	0	0	−2.525	

(H) Host

=== Fixtures ===
15 June 2019
10:45
Scorecard

Guernsey; 108/6 (20 overs)	v	Jersey; 109/2 (14.2 overs)
Josh Butler 65* (61); Anthony Hawkins-Kay 4/14 (3 overs)		Corey Bisson 54 (34); David Hooper 1/24 (4 overs)

Jersey won by 8 wickets
King George V Sports Ground, Castel
Umpires: Adriaan van den Dries (Ned) and Allan Haggo (Sco)
Player of the match: Josh Butler (Gue)

- Guernsey won the toss and elected to bat.
- Benjamin Ward (Jer) made his T20I debut.

15 June 2019
10:45
Scorecard

Norway; 151/3 (20 overs)	v	Italy; 85/1 (10 overs)
Walid Ghauri 44* (35); Baljit Singh 2/8 (3 overs)		Nicholas Maiolo 39* (22); Hayatullah Niazi 1/19 (2 overs)

Italy won by 20 runs (DLS method)
College Field, Saint Peter Port
Umpires: Rizwan Akram (Ned) and Mary Waldron (Ire)
Player of the match: Walid Ghauri (Nor)

- Norway won the toss and elected to bat.
- Italy were set a revised target of 66 runs from 10 overs due to rain.
- Anam Mollik, Jaspreet Singh (Ita), Khizer Ahmed, Waqas Ahmed, Tafseer Ali, Prithvi Bhart, Walid Ghauri, Ansar Iqbal, Raza Iqbal, Javed Maroofkhail, Hayatullah Niazi, Junaid Sheikh and Ehtsham Ul Haq (Nor) all made their T20I debuts.

15 June 2019
15:45
Scorecard

Guernsey; 117 (19.5 overs)	v	Germany; 118/5 (17 overs)
Ashley Wright 43 (36); Ahmed Wardak 4/20 (3.5 overs)		Craig Meschede 39* (26); Anthony Stokes 2/26 (4 overs)

Germany won by 5 wickets
King George V Sports Ground, Castel
Umpires: Adriaan van den Dries (Ned) and Alex Wharf (Eng)
Player of the match: Craig Meschede (Ger)

- Germany won the toss and elected to field.
- Craig Meschede (Ger) and Tom Kimber (Gue) both made their T20I debuts.

16 June 2019
10:45
Scorecard

Germany; 134/8 (20 overs)	v	Italy; 138/5 (19 overs)
Harmanjot Singh 40* (33); Baljit Singh 3/19 (4 overs)		Rehman Abdul 37* (31); Izatullah Dawlatzai 3/23 (4 overs)

Italy won by 5 wickets
College Field, Saint Peter Port
Umpires: Heath Kearns (Jer) and Alex Wharf (Eng)
Player of the match: Nicholas Maiolo (Ita)

- Italy won the toss and elected to field.

16 June 2019
10:45
Scorecard

Jersey; 131/9 (20 overs)	v	Denmark; 113/8 (20 overs)
Jonty Jenner 36 (27); Hamid Shah 4/23 (4 overs)		Abdul Hashmi 29 (29); Elliot Miles 3/10 (3 overs)

Jersey won by 18 runs
King George V Sports Ground, Castel
Umpires: Rizwan Akram (Ned) and Allan Haggo (Sco)

- Denmark won the toss and elected to field.
- Saif Ahmad, Taranjit Bharaj, Oliver Hald, Abdul Hashmi, Jino Jojo, Delawar Khan, Nicolaj Laegsgaard, Bashir Shah, Hamid Shah, Zishan Shah and Anique Uddin (Den) all made their T20I debuts.

16 June 2019
15:45
Scorecard

Italy; 121 (19.2 overs)	v	Guernsey; 110/8 (20 overs)
Joy Perera 47 (28); Luke Le Tissier 3/17 (4 overs)		Ben Ferbrache 55 (43); Gayashan Munasinghe 4/11 (4 overs)

Italy won by 11 runs
College Field, Saint Peter Port
Umpires: Mary Waldron (Ire) and Alex Wharf (Eng)

- Guernsey won the toss and elected to field.
- Charanjeet Singh (Ita) made his T20I debut.

16 June 2019
15:45
Scorecard

Jersey; 160/5 (20 overs)	v	Norway; 80 (19.2 overs)
Ben Stevens 44 (41); Prithvi Bhart 1/14 (4 overs)		Tafseer Ali 19 (28); Ben Stevens 3/17 (4 overs)

Jersey won by 80 runs
King George V Sports Ground, Castel
Umpires: Adriaan van den Dries (Ned) and Allan Haggo (Sco)
Player of the match: Ben Stevens (Jer)

- Jersey won the toss and elected to bat.
- Abdullah Sheikh (Nor) made his T20I debut.

17 June 2019
10:45
Scorecard

Denmark; 141/7 (20 overs)	v	Norway; 95/9 (20 overs)
Hamid Shah 40 (40); Waqas Ahmed 2/24 (3 overs)		Hayatullah Niazi 27 (23); Saif Ahmad 3/9 (4 overs)

Denmark won by 46 runs
King George V Sports Ground, Castel
Umpires: Heath Kearns (Jer) and Mary Waldron (Ire)
Player of the match: Saif Ahmad (Den)

- Denmark won the toss and elected to bat.
- Rizwan Mahmood (Den) made his T20I debut.
- The match was rescheduled after rain prevented play on 15 June.

18 June 2019
10:45
Scorecard

Denmark; 100/9 (16 overs)	v	Guernsey
Nicolaj Laegsgaard 39 (24); David Hooper 3/5 (2 overs)

No result
King George V Sports Ground, Castel
Umpires: Rizwan Akram (Ned) and Adriaan van den Dries (Ned)

- Guernsey won the toss and elected to field.
- No further play possible due to rain, with the match rescheduled for 20 June.
- Jordan Martel (Gue) made his T20I debut.

18 June 2019
15:45
Scorecard

Denmark	v	Italy

No result
King George V Sports Ground, Castel
Umpires: Rizwan Akram (Ned) and Mary Waldron (Ire)

- Denmark won the toss and elected to bat.
- No play possible due to rain, with the match rescheduled for 20 June.
- Anders Bülow (Den) made his T20I debut.

19 June 2019
10:45
Scorecard

Norway; 95/6 (16 overs)	v	Guernsey; 96/6 (15.5 overs)
Walid Ghauri 38 (28); Jordan Martel 3/15 (3 overs)		Josh Butler 36 (37); Raza Iqbal 2/20 (4 overs)

Guernsey won by 4 wickets
King George V Sports Ground, Castel
Umpires: Adriaan van den Dries (Ned) and Heath Kearns (Jer)

- Guernsey won the toss and elected to field.
- The match was reduced to 16 overs per side due to rain.
- Pratik Agnihotri and Nazakat Ali (Nor) both made their T20I debuts.

19 June 2019
15:45
Scorecard

Jersey; 149/6 (20 overs)	v	Italy; 76 (16.5 overs)
Jonty Jenner 71 (54); Rakibul Hasan 2/23 (4 overs)		Rehman Abdul 15 (16); Charles Perchard 4/14 (3.5 overs)

Jersey won by 73 runs
College Field, Saint Peter Port
Umpires: Rizwan Akram (Ned) and Alex Wharf (Eng)

- Italy won the toss and elected to field.

19 June 2019
15:45
Scorecard

Denmark; 109/8 (20 overs)	v	Germany; 110/3 (14.3 overs)
Anique Uddin 31 (29); Ahmed Wardak 3/26 (4 overs)		Craig Meschede 67 (43); Nicolaj Laegsgaard 1/16 (3 overs)

Germany won by 7 wickets
King George V Sports Ground, Castel
Umpires: Heath Kearns (Jer) and Mary Waldron (Ire)

- Germany won the toss and elected to field.
- Michael Richardson (Ger) made his T20I debut.

20 June 2019
10:45
Scorecard

Guernsey; 118/7 (20 overs)	v	Denmark; 112/9 (20 overs)
Oliver Newey 23* (26); Nicolaj Laegsgaard 2/13 (4 overs)		Nicolaj Laegsgaard 26 (28); William Peatfield 3/23 (4 overs)

Guernsey won by 6 runs
King George V Sports Ground, Castel
Umpires: Rizwan Akram (Ned) and Adriaan van den Dries (Ned)
Player of the match: Nicolaj Laegsgaard (Den)

- Denmark won the toss and elected to field.
- Omar Hayat (Den) made his T20I debut.

20 June 2019
10:45
Scorecard

Norway; 99 (20 overs)	v	Germany; 101/3 (11.1 overs)
Pratik Agnihotri 19 (27); Izatullah Dawlatzai 3/27 (4 overs)		Michael Richardson 35* (25); Waqas Ahmed 1/22 (2 overs)

Germany won by 7 wickets
College Field, Saint Peter Port
Umpires: Allan Haggo (Sco) and Heath Kearns (Jer)
Player of the match: Craig Meschede (Ger)

- Germany won the toss and elected to field.

20 June 2019
15:45
Scorecard

Denmark; 158/9 (20 overs)	v	Italy; 128 (19.3 overs)
Zishan Shah 50 (36); Baljit Singh 4/20 (4 overs)		Michael Ross 34 (20); Oliver Hald 3/18 (3.3 overs)

Denmark won by 30 runs
King George V Sports Ground, Castel
Umpires: Rizwan Akram (Ned) and Mary Waldron (Ire)
Player of the match: Zishan Shah (Den)

- Denmark won the toss and elected to bat.
- Simranjit Singh (Ita) made his T20I debut.

20 June 2019
15:45
Scorecard

Jersey; 134/5 (20 overs)	v	Germany; 136/7 (14.2 overs)
Benjamin Ward 58* (38); Abdul Shakoor 2/21 (4 overs)		Craig Meschede 40 (25); Benjamin Ward 2/14 (1 over)

Germany won by 3 wickets
College Field, Saint Peter Port
Umpires: Allan Haggo (Sco) and Alex Wharf (Eng)
Player of the match: Benjamin Ward (Jer)

- Germany won the toss and elected to field.
