= Oliver Hald =

Danish cricketer (born 1999)

Personal information
- Full name: Oliver Damgaard Hald
- Born: 20 December 1999 (age 26); Herning, Denmark
- Batting: Left-handed
- Bowling: Left-arm medium

International information
- National side: Denmark
- T20I debut (cap 7): 16 June 2019 v Jersey
- Last T20I: 28 August 2024 v Guernsey
- T20I shirt no.: 84
- Source: Cricinfo, 28 August 2024

Oliver Damgaard Hald (born 20 December 1999) is a Danish cricketer who plays for the Denmark national team. Hald bats and bowls left-handed. In May 2019, he was named in Denmark's squad for a five-match series against Leinster Lightning in Ireland, in preparation for the Regional Finals of the 2018–19 ICC T20 World Cup Europe Qualifier tournament in Guernsey. The same month, he was named in Denmark's squad for the Regional Finals qualification tournament. He made his Twenty20 International (T20I) debut against Jersey, on 16 June 2019.

He was part of Denmark's squad for the 2019 Malaysia Cricket World Cup Challenge League A tournament. He made his List A debut against Malaysia, in the Cricket World Cup Challenge League A tournament on 16 September 2019.
