= Matthew Stokes (cricketer) =

Guernsey cricketer (born 1995)

Personal information
- Full name: Matthew William Reeve Stokes
- Born: 7 October 1995 (age 31); Edinburgh
- Batting: Right-handed
- Bowling: Right-arm medium pace
- Role: All-rounder

International information
- National side: Guernsey
- T20I debut (cap 10): 31 May 2019 v Jersey
- Last T20I: 23 May 2026 v Jersey

Career statistics
Competition	T20I
Matches	55
Runs scored	1,368
Batting average	40.23
100s/50s	1/7
Top score	100
Balls bowled	674
Wickets	33
Bowling average	24.66
5 wickets in innings	0
10 wickets in match	0
Best bowling	3/42
Catches/stumpings	24/–
- Source: Cricinfo, 26 May 2026

Matthew Stokes (born 7 October 1995) is a cricketer who plays for Guernsey. He played in the 2014 ICC World Cricket League Division Five tournament. In May 2015 he participated in the 2015 ICC Europe Division One tournament.

On 8 September 2015 in the 2015 ICC World Cricket League Division Six, Stokes scored an unbeaten 135 against Botswana.

He played in the 2016 ICC World Cricket League Division Five tournament, becoming the second highest run scorer in the competition with 247 runs from 6 matches.

In September 2018, he was the leading run-scorer for Guernsey in Group C of the 2018–19 ICC World Twenty20 Europe Qualifier tournament, with 132 runs in five matches.

In May 2019, he was named in Guernsey's squad for the 2019 T20 Inter-Insular Cup. He made his Twenty20 International (T20I) debut for Guernsey against Jersey on 31 May 2019. The same month, he was named in Guernsey's squad for the Regional Finals of the 2018–19 ICC T20 World Cup Europe Qualifier tournament in Guernsey.

In May 2021, during the Odey Wealth Championship in Guernsey, Stokes scored 213 not out from 168 balls in a 50-over match.

On 3 May 2026, Stokes became the first Guernsey player to make a T20I century when he scored exactly 100 against the Isle of Man at King George V Sports Ground.
