= Nicolaj Laegsgaard =

Danish cricketer (born 1996)

Personal information
- Full name: Nicolaj Damgaard Laegsgaard
- Born: 18 November 1996 (age 29); Herning, Denmark
- Batting: Left-handed
- Bowling: Slow left-arm orthodox

International information
- National side: Denmark (2019-2024)
- T20I debut (cap 9): 16 June 2019 v Jersey
- Last T20I: 28 August 2024 v Guernsey
- T20I shirt no.: 83

Domestic team information
- Years: Team
- 2023–2024: Munster Reds

Career statistics
Competition	T20I	LA	T20
Matches	29	22	37
Runs scored	533	368	608
Batting average	23.17	19.36	20.96
100s/50s	0/3	0/3	0/3
Top score	91	69	91
Balls bowled	513	972	621
Wickets	33	28	37
Bowling average	14.72	22.00	16.37
5 wickets in innings	0	1	0
10 wickets in match	0	0	0
Best bowling	4/19	6/6	4/19
Catches/stumpings	20/–	11/–	26/–
- Source: Cricinfo, 29 June 2026

Nicolaj Damgaard Laegsgaard (born 18 November 1996) also known as Nicolaj Jørgensen is a Danish cricketer. In April 2018, he was named in Denmark's squad for the 2018 ICC World Cricket League Division Four tournament in Malaysia. He played in Denmark's third match of the tournament, against Malaysia.

== Career ==
In September 2018, he was the most economical bowler in Group A of the 2018–19 ICC World Twenty20 Europe Qualifier tournament, with an economy rate of 2.85, and the leading wicket-taker for Denmark, with nine dismissals in five matches.

In September 2018, he was included in Denmark's squad for the 2018 ICC World Cricket League Division Three tournament in Oman. Ahead of the tournament, he was named as the player to watch in Denmark's squad. In May 2019, he was named in Denmark's squad for a five-match series against Leinster Lightning in Ireland, in preparation for the Regional Finals of the 2018–19 ICC T20 World Cup Europe Qualifier tournament in Guernsey. The same month, he was named in Denmark's squad for the Regional Finals qualification tournament. He made his Twenty20 International (T20I) debut, against Jersey, on 16 June 2019. He was named the player of the match against Norway, in his second T20I.

In August 2019, he was named in Denmark's squad for the 2019 Malaysia Cricket World Cup Challenge League A tournament. He made his List A debut against Malaysia, in the Cricket World Cup Challenge League A tournament on 16 September 2019.
