= Abdul Hashmi =

Danish cricketer (born 1997)

Personal information
- Full name: Abdul Wahab Hashmi
- Born: 4 September 1997 (age 29); Odense, Denmark
- Batting: Right-handed

International information
- National side: Denmark
- T20I debut (cap 1): 16 June 2019 v Jersey
- Last T20I: 16 June 2024 v Jersey
- T20I shirt no.: 80
- Source: ESPNcricinfo, 7 October 2024

Abdul Hashmi (born 4 September 1997) is a Danish cricketer, who plays for the national team. In September 2016, he was named in Denmark's squad for the 2016 ICC World Cricket League Division Four tournament in US. He played in Denmark's last match of the tournament, against Bermuda.

In September 2018, Hashmi was named in Denmark's squad for the 2018 ICC World Cricket League Division Three tournament in Oman. In May 2019, he was included in Denmark's squad for a five-match series against Leinster Lightning in Ireland, in preparation for the Regional Finals of the 2018–19 ICC T20 World Cup Europe Qualifier tournament in Guernsey. The same month, he was named in Denmark's squad for the Regional Finals qualification tournament. He made his Twenty20 International (T20I) debut for Denmark, against Jersey, on 16 June 2019.

In August 2019, Hashmi was named in Denmark's squad for the 2019 Malaysia Cricket World Cup Challenge League A tournament. He made his List A debut, against Malaysia, in the Cricket World Cup Challenge League A tournament on 16 September 2019.
