= Delawar Khan =

Danish cricketer (born 1997)

Personal information
- Full name: Delawar Khan
- Born: 15 February 1997 (age 29)
- Batting: Right-handed
- Bowling: Left-arm medium

International information
- National side: Denmark
- T20I debut (cap 6): 16 June 2019 v Jersey
- Last T20I: 28 August 2024 v Guernsey
- T20I shirt no.: 87
- Source: Cricinfo, 28 August 2024

Delawar Khan (born 15 February 1997) is a Danish cricketer who plays for the national team. In May 2019, he was named in Denmark's squad for a five-match series against Leinster Lightning in Ireland, in preparation for the Regional Finals of the 2018–19 ICC T20 World Cup Europe Qualifier tournament in Guernsey. The same month, he was named in Denmark's squad for the Regional Finals qualification tournament. He made his Twenty20 International (T20I) debut, against Jersey, on 16 June 2019.

In August 2019, he was named in Denmark's squad for the 2019 Malaysia Cricket World Cup Challenge League A tournament. He made his List A debut for Denmark, against Singapore, in the 2019 Malaysia Cricket World Cup Challenge League A tournament on 19 September 2019. In October 2021, he was named in Denmark's T20I squad for the Regional Final of the 2021 ICC Men's T20 World Cup Europe Qualifier tournament.
