= Lucky Ali (cricketer) =

Danish cricketer (born 2003)

Lucky Ali Malik
Personal information
- Full name: Lucky Ali Malik
- Born: 20 October 2003 (age 23); Copenhagen, Denmark
- Batting: Left-handed
- Bowling: Slow left-arm orthodox
- Role: Batsman

International information
- National side: Denmark (2019-present)
- T20I debut (cap 17): 13 July 2019 v Finland
- Last T20I: 28 July 2023 v Jersey
- T20I shirt no.: 88
- Source: Cricinfo, 7 October 2024

Lucky Ali Malik (born 20 October 2003) is a Danish cricketer, who has played for the national team. He made his Twenty20 International (T20I) debut for Denmark, against Finland, on 13 July 2019.

Malik is a right-handed batsman who bowls left-arm off spin. In August 2019, he was named in Denmark's squad for the 2019 Malaysia Cricket World Cup Challenge League A tournament. Malik made his List A debut against Qatar, in the Cricket World Cup Challenge League A tournament on 23 September 2019.

In 2018, he participated in a tournament in the Netherlands (European Cup) where the Netherlands, Essex cricket county and Sweden participated. During the tournament there was a trophy at stake (Man of the tournament European cup) and in this tournament Malik took 14 wickets and made 123 runs with the bat, where he took 7 wickets for only 3 runs. In October 2021, he was named in Denmark's T20I squad for the Regional Final of the 2021 ICC Men's T20 World Cup Europe Qualifier tournament.
