= List of Norway Twenty20 International cricketers =

This is a list of Norwegian Twenty20 International cricketers.

In April 2018, the International Cricket Council (ICC) decided to grant full Twenty20 International (T20I) status to all its members. Therefore, all Twenty20 matches played between Norway and other ICC members after 1 January 2019 have the full T20I status.

This list comprises names of all members of the Norway cricket team who have played at least one T20I match. It is initially arranged in the order in which each player won his first Twenty20 cap. Where more than one player won his first Twenty20 cap in the same match, their surnames are listed alphabetically.

Norway played their first matches with T20I status on 15 June 2019 during the European Qualifying Finals for the 2019 ICC T20 World Cup Qualifier.

== Key ==
General

- ‡ – Captain
- † – Wicket-keeper
- First – Year of debut
- Last – Year of latest game
- Mat – Number of matches played

Batting

- Runs – Runs scored in career
- HS – Highest score
- Avg – Runs scored per dismissal
- * – Batsman remained not out
- 50 – Number of half centuries
- 100 – Number of centuries

Bowling

- Balls – Balls bowled in career
- Wkt – Wickets taken in career
- BBI – Best bowling in an innings
- Ave – Average runs per wicket

Fielding

- Ca – Catches taken
- St – Stumpings affected

== List of players ==
Statistics are correct as of 14 July 2026.

Norway T20I cricketers
General					Batting					Bowling				Fielding		Ref
No.	Name	First	Last	Mat	Runs	HS	Avg	50	100	Balls	Wkt	BBI	Ave	Ca	St	Ref
1	Ansar Iqbal†	2019	2022	9	154	40	22.00	0	0	24	0	–	–	0	0	
2	Prithvi Bhart	2019	2021	10	5	2*	2.50	0	0	180	7	2/29	25.14	1	0	
3	Hayatullah Niazi	2019	2026	8	140	53	28.00	1	0	144	8	3/18	22.25	0	0	
4	Javed Maroofkhail	2019	2024	14	95	27*	11.87	0	0	54	3	2/14	23.33	4	0	
5	Junaid Sheikh	2019	2019	5	19	9	6.33	0	0	96	2	1/21	52.00	5	0	
6	Khizer Ahmed‡†	2019	2026	47	806	64*	20.15	2	0	–	–	–	–	32	9	
7	Raza Iqbal‡	2019	2024	31	524	64*	17.71	4	0	546	35	5/23	15.74	14	0	
8	Tafseer Ali	2019	2026	16	146	28	11.23	0	0	24	1	1/17	37.00	3	0	
9	Ehtsham Ul Haq	2019	2021	10	75	30	7.50	0	0	1	0	–	–	3	0	
10	Walid Ghauri	2019	2026	37	939	100*	29.34	4	1	83	3	1/16	38.33	17	0	
11	Waqas Ahmed	2019	2021	10	56	32*	14.00	0	0	138	8	2/24	19.25	1	0	
12	Abdullah Sheikh	2019	2022	5	16	11	5.33	0	0	72	2	1/19	39.00	1	0	
13	Pratik Agnihotri	2019	2019	2	25	19	12.50	0	0	–	–	–	–	1	0	
14	Nazakat Ali	2019	2019	2	35	25	17.50	0	0	18	1	1/6	16.00	1	0	
15	Kuruge Abeyrathna†	2021	2026	43	714	46*	19.29	0	0	376	24	3/14	18.45	16	1	
16	Ahmadullah Shinwari	2021	2026	38	89	34*	8.90	0	0	697	35	4/20	22.54	11	0	
17	Bilal Safdar	2021	2022	9	73	37*	12.16	0	0	66	0	3/17	19.66	5	0	
18	Faizan Mumtaz	2021	2021	3	4	4	2.00	0	0	–	–	–	–	0	0	
19	Sher Sahak	2021	2026	41	580	70*	20.71	2	0	218	19	5/8	13.52	19	0	
20	Usman Arif	2021	2025	12	166	44	15.09	0	0	66	5	2/13	18.80	5	0	
21	Vinay Ravi	2021	2026	49	247	24	12.35	0	0	944	49	4/22	21.14	17	0	
22	Hashir Hussain	2021	2021	1	–	–	–	–	–	6	0	–	–	0	0	
23	Junaid Mehmood†	2021	2026	16	154	30*	11.84	0	0	–	–	–	–	5	0	
24	Wahidullah Sahak	2021	2026	22	347	75	20.41	3	0	314	24	3/17	16.79	16	0	
25	Ali Saleem‡	2022	2024	21	239	53*	15.93	1	0	6	1	1/4	4.00	5	0	
26	Aminullah Tanha	2022	2025	5	9	4	1.80	0	0	–	–	–	–	1	0	
27	Ibrahim Rahimi†	2022	2026	32	489	55*	18.80	1	0	18	1	1/8	40.00	19	1	
28	Qamar Mushtaque	2022	2026	47	296	50	13.45	1	0	837	60	3/16	16.15	19	0	
29	Muhammad Butt	2022	2026	28	127	45*	10.58	0	0	599	37	5/8	14.70	7	0	
30	Rhys Saunders	2022	2022	2	15	14	7.50	0	0	–	–	–	–	0	0	
31	Chaudhary Akram	2023	2026	15	333	57	27.75	1	0	120	8	2/13	20.62	7	0	
32	Nouman Butt	2023	2023	2	12	7	6.00	0	0	–	–	–	–	0	0	
33	Saif-Ul Islam	2023	2026	9	202	91*	28.85	1	0	–	–	–	1	0		
34	Rafaqat Ali	2023	2023	1	–	–	–	–	–	6	0	–	–	0	0	
35	Anil Parmar	2024	2026	23	2	1*	2.00	0	0	462	34	4/17	14.52	10	0	
36	Mandeep Singh	2024	2024	5	59	31*	19.66	0	0	–	–	–	–	3	0	
37	Mofassar Saeed	2024	2024	1	17	17	17.00	0	0	–	–	–	–	0	0	
38	Faisal Raza	2025	2026	25	314	48	15.70	0	0	24	1	1/18	39.00	7	0	
39	Vishal Sharma	2025	2025	11	65	23	8.12	0	0	18	1	1/28	38.00	5	0	
40	Mansoor Shah	2025	2026	8	5	2	2.50	0	0	143	10	3/19	21.60	4	0	
41	Ankit Gupta	2025	2026	5	6	3*	6.00	0	0	72	3	2/18	34.00	0	0	
42	Adnan Shnwarei	2025	2025	4	3	2	1.50	0	0	28	2	2/26	24.50	3	0	
43	Syed Jawad Haider	2026	2026	1	2	2	2.00	0	0	18	1	1/28	28.00	1	0	
44	Daud Asghar	2026	2026	2	16	12	8.00	0	0	–	–	–	–	0	0	
45	Akhter Pacha Sher	2026	2026	3	53	53	17.66	1	0	–	–	–	–	3	0	
46	Farmanullah Ghari	2026	2026	5	16	7	5.33	0	0	98	6	3/10	17.83	0	0	
