= Norway national cricket team =

Cricket team that represents Norway in men's international cricket

Norway
- Association: Norwegian Cricket Federation

Personnel
- Captain: Khizer Ahmed
- Coach: Zeeshan Siddiqui

International Cricket Council
- ICC status: Associate member (2017); Affiliate member (2000)
- ICC region: Europe
ICC Rankings	Current	Best-ever
T20I	46th	30th (16-Jun-2019)

International cricket
- First international: v Austria at Seebarn Cricket Ground; 22 August 2000

T20 Internationals
- First T20I: v Italy at College Field, Saint Peter Port; 15 June 2019
- Last T20I: v Gibraltar at Koge Cricket Club, Køge; 14 July 2026
T20Is	Played	Won/Lost
Total	63	31/32 (0 ties, 0 no results)
This year	14	5/9 (0 ties, 0 no results)
T20I kit
- As of 14 July 2026

The Norway national cricket team represents Norway in international cricket matches. The Norwegian Cricket Federation became an affiliate member of the International Cricket Council (ICC) in 2000, and the national side played its first international match in August the same year. Most of the side's matches have been against members of the European Cricket Council (ECC), although in more recent years Norway has fielded sides in the lower divisions of the World Cricket League (WCL). The team's current head coach is Muhammad Haroon, a former first-class player in Pakistan, who was appointed in early 2014. In 2017, they became an associate member of the ICC. Norway achieved their highest ever ICC T20I ranking (30th) under Haroon’s coaching. Norway was also honoured with the ICC Accelerated Growth Member Award in 2017. This recognition was part of the ICC’s annual Development Awards, which celebrate outstanding contributions to the growth of cricket among its member nations.

== History ==
Norwegian cricket was first organised in the 1960s by a few Asian immigrants and has grown to the current state of 55 clubs playing in five divisions.

Norway became a member of the International Cricket Council in 2000 and played in their first international tournament – the European Representative Championships in Austria – that same year. They won the tournament without losing a game, but did not play again until 2003, when they took part in the ECC Trophy for the first time. They won this tournament too, again without losing a game. This qualified the team for a place in Division Two of the European Championship in 2004. They finished fourth in the six-team tournament, gaining wins against Gibraltar and Israel.

In 2005 Norway won the European Affiliates Championship, the equivalent of the ECC Trophy. They once again won the tournament without losing a game, and again qualified for Division Two of the European Championship in 2006. They won the tournament, beating debutants Jersey in the final after losing to them in the group stage. This gave Norway a place in Division One for the first time in 2008 and earned them a place in Division Five of the World Cricket League.

In May 2008, Norway travelled to Jersey to take part in the Division Five tournament. Although they beat Vanuatu in Group A, it was the team's only group stage win and with four loses they failed to make the semi-finals. Norway finished ninth overall after defeating the Bahamas and then Japan in positional playoff matches. With only the top two from this tournament qualifying for Division Four in Tanzania later in the year, Norway missed out on the chance to take their 2011 World Cup dream any further.

In July 2008, Norway met the top nations of European cricket when they participated in Division One of the European Championship. The Norwegians finished sixth overall in the six-team tournament, beaten convincingly in four of their matches – against Denmark, Ireland, the Netherlands, and Scotland – whilst their match against Italy was abandoned owing to rain.

In August 2009, Norway travelled to Singapore to compete in Division Six of the World Cricket League. They won only one of five group matches and finished sixth overall after losing a positional playoff to Botswana. As a result, Norway were relegated to Division Seven.

In May 2011, Norway travelled to Botswana for Division Seven of the World Cricket League and their relatively poor performances at ICC events continued as they finished fifth overall, although they did beat Japan in a group match and then a positional playoff. Fifth place saw Norway relegated to Division Eight of the World Cricket League.

However, by the end of year 2011 a drastic change in team performance was observed in the World Cricket League, mainly due to the inclusion of a number of new, younger, and fitter players. Under the captaincy of Rakesh the team went on to win several qualifying rounds and titles in games against higher or similarly ranked teams, such as Japan. In June 2012, in the World Cricket League, the team gained the top spot in the shortest format of the game, with amazing reformations in the field. This success won Norway a spot in another ICC qualifier event, potentially securing them a place in the T20 World Cup competition.

In 2013 the team competed in the 2013 ICC European T20 Championship Division One in England; they finished in 8th place, securing wins over Sweden and Gibraltar.

In 2014, Norway started their tour; their first game was against Old Southendian and Southchurch cricket club on 21 June. They lost this T20 match by four runs.

=== 2018–present ===
In April 2018, the ICC decided to grant full Twenty20 International (T20I) status to all its members. Therefore, all Twenty20 matches played between Norway and other ICC members after 1 January 2019 would be a full T20I.

In September 2018, Norway qualified from Group C of the 2018–19 ICC World Twenty20 Europe Qualifier to the Regional Finals of the tournament.

The Norwegians played their first T20I match against Italy on 15 June 2019.

15 June 2019
10:45
Scorecard

Norway; 151/3 (20 overs)	v	Italy; 85/1 (10 overs)
Walid Ghauri 44* (35); Baljit Singh 2/8 (3 overs)		Nicholas Maiolo 39* (22); Hayatullah Niazi 1/19 (2 overs)

Italy won by 20 runs (DLS method)
College Field, Saint Peter Port
Umpires: Rizwan Akram (Ned) and Mary Waldron (Ire)
Player of the match: Walid Ghauri (Nor)

- Norway won the toss and elected to bat.
- Italy were set a revised target of 66 runs from 10 overs due to rain.
- First ever T20I match for Norway.

== Grounds ==
Locations of all stadiums which have hosted international cricket matches within Norway

== Tournament history ==
=== T20 World Cup Europe Regional Final ===
ICC T20 World Cup Europe Regional Final records
Year	Round	Position	GP	W	L	T	NR
(Guernsey) 2019	Group stage	6/6	5	0	5	0	0
(Spain) 2021	Did not qualify						
(Scotland) 2023	Did not qualify						
(Netherlands) 2025	Did not qualify						
Total	1/4	0 Titles	5	0	5	0	0

=== Other tournaments ===
World Cricket League	T20 World Cup Europe Sub-regional Qualifiers	European Cricket Championship	European T20 Championship
2008 (Division Five): 9th place; 2009 (Division Six): 6th place; 2011 (Division Seven): 5th place; 2012 (Division Eight): 5th place	2019: Group winners (Advanced to regional final); 2023: Runners-up; 2024: Runners-up	1996 to 2002: Did not participate; 2004 (Division Two): 4th place; 2006 (Division Two): Winners; 2008 (Division One): 6th place; 2010 (Division Two): 5th place	2013 (Division One): 8th place; 2014 (Division Two): 1st place

== Current squad ==
The following is a list of the players included in Norway's squad for the finals of the 2018–19 ICC T20 World Cup Europe Qualifier in Jersey in June 2019.

- Raza Iqbal
- Wahidullah Sahak
- Khizer Ahmed (captain)
- Vinay Ravi
- Junaid Mehmood
- Tafseer Ali
- Ahmadullah Shinwari
- Walid Ghauri
- Ansar Iqbal
- Javed Maroofkhail
- Qamar Mushtaque
- Mohammad Sher Sahak
- Darshana Kuruge
- Ibrahim Rahimi
- Anil Parmer

== International grounds ==
Locations of stadiums which have hosted international cricket matches in Norway

Ground	City	Region	Capacity	Matches hosted	Notes
Fornebu Cricket Ground	Bærum	Akershus	1,000	T20Is, ICC qualifiers	Norway’s main cricket venue; hosted international tournaments and ECN events

== Records and statistics ==
International match summary — Norway

Last updated 14 July 2026

Playing Record
Format	M	W	L	T	NR	Inaugural Match
Twenty20 Internationals	63	31	32	0	0	15 June 2019

=== Twenty20 International ===
- Highest team total: 186/6 v Czech Republic, 25 July 2022 at Tikkurila Cricket Ground, Vantaa
- Highest individual score: 70* by Sher Sahak v Guernsey, 29 April 2022 at Desert Springs Cricket Ground, Almería
- Best individual bowling figures: 5/8, Muhammad Butt v Czech Republic, 25 July 2022 at Tikkurila Cricket Ground, Vantaa

Most T20I runs for Norway

Player	Runs	Average	Career span
Walid Ghauri	939	29.34	2019–2026
Khizer Ahmed	806	20.15	2019–2026
Kuruge Abeyrathna	714	19.29	2021–2026
Sher Sahak	580	20.71	2021–2026
Raza Iqbal	524	18.71	2019–2024

Most T20I wickets for Norway

Player	Wickets	Average	Career span
Qamar Mushtaque	60	16.15	2022–2026
Vinay Ravi	49	21.14	2022–2026
Muhammad Butt	37	14.70	2022–2026
Raza Iqbal	35	15.74	2019–2024
Ahmadullah Shinwari	35	22.54	2021–2026

T20I record versus other nations

Records complete to T20I #4034. Last updated 14 July 2026.

Opponent	M	W	L	T	NR	First match	First win
vs Associate Members
Austria	7	2	5	0	0	31 July 2022	9 June 2025
Czech Republic	3	3	0	0	0	25 July 2022	25 July 2022
Denmark	4	1	3	0	0	17 June 2019	14 June 2025
Estonia	2	2	0	0	0	24 July 2022	24 July 2022
Finland	8	5	3	0	0	19 May 2023	19 May 2023
France	7	3	4	0	0	5 August 2021	7 August 2021
Germany	5	2	3	0	0	20 June 2019	8 August 2021
Gibraltar	2	2	0	0	0	13 July 2024	13 July 2024
Guernsey	3	1	2	0	0	19 June 2019	29 April 2022
Hungary	2	1	1	0	0	17 August 2025	17 August 2025
Italy	1	0	1	0	0	15 June 2019	
Jersey	2	0	2	0	0	16 June 2019	
Portugal	5	1	4	0	0	7 April 2025	7 April 2025
Slovenia	1	1	0	0	0	9 July 2024	9 July 2024
Spain	2	0	2	0	0	30 April 2022	
Sweden	7	5	2	0	0	18 May 2023	18 May 2023
Switzerland	1	1	0	0	0	28 July 2022	28 July 2022
Turkey	1	1	0	0	0	10 July 2026	10 July 2026

== See also ==
- List of Norway Twenty20 International cricketers
- Norway women's national cricket team
