= Denmark national cricket team =

Denmark
- Association: Danish Cricket Federation

Personnel
- Captain: Hamid Shah
- Coach: Keith Dabengwa

International Cricket Council
- ICC status: Associate member (1966)
- ICC region: Europe
ICC Rankings	Current	Best-ever
T20I	37th	24th (2 May 2019)

One Day Internationals
- World Cup Qualifier appearances: 7 (first in 1979)
- Best result: 3rd place (1986)

T20 Internationals
- First T20I: v. Jersey at King George V Sports Ground, Castel; 16 June 2019
- Last T20I: v. Romania at Svanholm Park, Brøndby; 14 July 2026
T20Is	Played	Won/Lost
Total	54	29/23 (0 ties, 2 no results)
This year	9	8/1 (0 ties, 0 no results)
- T20 World Cup Qualifier appearances: 3 (Note: For the 2024 and 2026 Men's T20 World Cups, the final round of qualification in Europe was the ICC Europe Regional Final.) (first in 2012)
- Best result: 6th (2023)
List A & and T20I kit
- As of 14 July 2026

The Denmark national cricket team represents Denmark in international cricket. They have been an associate member of the International Cricket Council (ICC) since 1966, and have previously been a part of the ICC's High Performance Programme.

Denmark played in the inaugural edition of the ICC Cricket World Cup Challenge League, starting in August 2019, as a result of finishing in Division Three of the now defunct World Cricket League.

== History ==
=== Beginnings ===
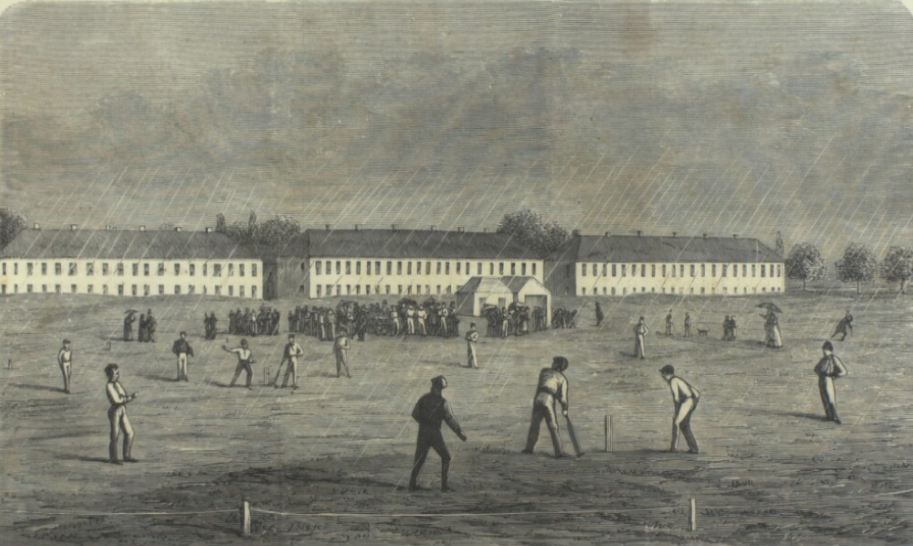
Cricket match between players from Copenhagen and Jutland on the Eastern Common in Copenhagen 1867

Cricket has been played in Denmark since the mid-19th century, with the first club being formed in 1865 by English railway engineers. The first organised match was played the following year between two teams of English players, with the first matches involving Danish players taking place in 1866. The game expanded greatly over the following twenty years, with 30 new clubs being formed in 1883.

Several touring sides from England and Scotland visited the country in the early part of the 20th century, including the famous Marylebone Cricket Club. In 1933, an attempt to organise the first international match against the Netherlands failed, and the Danish national side did not play their first match until 1954, against Oxford University, the year after the current Danish Cricket Federation was formed.

They then began to play against other national sides, primarily the Netherlands, who they first played in 1955. They played their first match against Scotland in 1961.

=== ICC membership ===
Denmark became an associate member of the ICC in 1966, drawing their international against Scotland that year. They played Bermuda for the first time in 1969 and drew their first match against Ireland in 1970. They finally picked up their first international win against the Netherlands in 1972.

They played their first matches against Canada in 1974, losing a three-day match but winning the limited overs match. They played home internationals against East Africa and Sri Lanka, beating East Africa. They toured East Africa the following year, drawing with both East Africa and Kenya.

They took part in the first ICC Trophy in 1979, reaching the semi-final where they lost to Sri Lanka. They did not take part in the 1982 tournament. In 1983, Ole Mortensen became the first Danish player to play county cricket. Denmark returned to the ICC Trophy in 1986 and finished third after beating Bermuda in the third place play-off.

In 1989, Denmark hosted Australia for two one-day matches. They lost the first match in Brøndby by 45 runs and lost the second in Copenhagen by 54 runs. They fared better at home against Canada that year, winning twice against them. After playing both home and away against Bangladesh in 1990, they played in the ICC Trophy, reaching the second round.

Denmark again played in the ICC Trophy in 1994, finishing tenth in the tournament after losing to Namibia in the plate final. They played their first matches against France in 1995, and hosted the first European Cricket Championship in 1996, finishing third. They finished fifth in the following years ICC Trophy and were runners up in the European Championship in 1998.

In 1999, Denmark took part in the NatWest Trophy for the first time. The following year, they took part in the ICC Emerging Nations Tournament in Zimbabwe, where they finished fourth, and the European Championship, where they finished last, without winning a game. The following year, they took part in the ICC Trophy in Canada, finishing eighth. The MCC toured Denmark in 2002, and Denmark won all three matches. They won just one match at that year's European Championship, finishing fifth ahead of Italy.

=== 2000-2017 ===
The Netherlands visited Denmark in 2003, winning both matches. Denmark played a two match series against Ireland later in the year, losing both matches and missing out on qualification for the ICC Intercontinental Cup. They again finished last in the European Championship the following year. In 2005, they played their final match in the Cheltenham & Gloucester Trophy, losing heavily to Northamptonshire at Svanholm Park before taking part in the 2005 ICC Trophy, where they again finished eighth.

In 2006, Denmark again took part in the European Championship, finishing fourth after winning only against Italy. At the end of that year, it was announced that they would join the ICC's High Performance Programme from 1 April 2007.

In August 2007, Denmark registered a win over Bermuda, an ODI playing country, and towards the end of October 2007 they played in Kenya against domestic teams and Kenya A. Denmark, led by Freddie Klokker who scored consecutive centuries in all their matches, clean swept the Kenyan sides and Kenya A. Denmark bowled, batted and fielded exceptionally well.

In November 2007, Denmark took part in Division Two of the World Cricket League. In finishing fourth, they qualified to compete in the 2009 ICC World Cup Qualifier. However, they eventually came last of the twelve teams, meaning they were relegated to Division Three of the World Cricket League. They next competed in the 2011 ICC World Cricket League Division Three, where they came 5th to be relegated to the Division Four.

In November 2013, they competed in the 2013 ICC World Twenty20 Qualifier in the UAE where they finished in last place, failing to win a game.

=== 2018-Present ===
In April 2018, the ICC decided to grant full Twenty20 International (T20I) status to all its members. Therefore, all Twenty20 matches played between Denmark and other ICC members after 1 January 2019 have the full T20I status.

In September 2018, Denmark qualified from Group A of the 2018–19 ICC World Twenty20 Europe Qualifier to the Regional Finals of the tournament.

Denmark played their first T20I match against Jersey on 16 June 2019.

16 June 2019
10:45
Scorecard

Jersey; 131/9 (20 overs)	v	Denmark; 113/8 (20 overs)
Jonty Jenner 36 (27); Hamid Shah 4/23 (4 overs)		Abdul Hashmi 29 (29); Elliot Miles 3/10 (3 overs)

Jersey won by 18 runs
King George V Sports Ground, Castel
Umpires: Rizwan Akram (Ned) and Allan Haggo (Sco)

- Denmark won the toss and elected to field.
- First ever T20I match for Denmark.

Since April 2019, Denmark has played in the 2019–2022 ICC Cricket World Cup Challenge League.

In July 2026, Denmark won the T20 World Cup Europe Sub-regional Qualifier B going unbeaten throughout the tournament and defeating Romania by six runs in the final. The event was part of the qualification process for the 2028 Men's T20 World Cup and as a result of their success they advanced to the regional final.

== Grounds ==
Locations of all stadiums which have hosted an international cricket match within Denmark

Ground	City	Region	Capacity	Matches hosted	Notes
Svanholm Park	Brøndby	Capital Region	1,000	T20Is, ICC Europe events	Denmark's main international ground; home to Svanholm CC
Nykøbing Mors Cricket Club Ground	Nykøbing Mors	North Denmark Region	600	Domestic finals	Hosts regional championship finals and development matches
Glostrup Cricket Ground	Glostrup	Capital Region	800	T20Is, youth internationals	Frequently used for ICC European tournaments
Esbjerg Cricket Club Ground	Esbjerg	Region of Southern Denmark	500	Development matches	Occasionally used for ICC development games and domestic competitions
Frederiksberg Park	Frederiksberg	Capital Region	1,200	Historical matches	One of the oldest cricket venues in Denmark; used in the 19th and early 20th centuries

== Tournament history ==
Legend

- Champions
- Runners-up
- Third place/Semi-finals
- Hosts
- Q Qualified/Advanced to next stage
- DNQ Did not qualify
- ▲ Promoted
- Remained in the same division
- ▼ Relegated

=== Cricket World Cup ===
Cricket World Cup record								Qualification record				
Year	Round	Position	Pld	W	L	T	NR	Pld	W	L	T	NR
(England) 1975	Not invited							No qualifiers held				
(England) 1979	Did not qualify							5	4	1	0	0
(England) (Wales) 1983	Did not enter							Did not enter				
(India) (Pakistan) 1987	Did not qualify							8	6	2	0	0
(Australia) (New Zealand) 1992	Did not qualify							6	3	3	0	0
(Pakistan) (India) (Sri Lanka) 1996	Did not qualify							7	4	3	0	0
(England) (Wales) (Scotland) (Republic of Ireland) (Netherlands) 1999	Did not qualify							9	6	2	0	1
(South Africa) (Zimbabwe) (Kenya) 2003	Did not qualify							9	4	5	0	0
(Cricket West Indies) 2007	Did not qualify							7	2	4	0	1
(India) (Sri Lanka) (Bangladesh) 2011	Did not qualify							13	2	11	0	0
(Australia) (New Zealand) 2015	Did not qualify							12	5	7	0	0
(England) (Wales) 2019	Did not qualify							12	8	4	0	0
(India) 2023	Did not qualify							15	8	6	0	1
(South Africa) (Zimbabwe) (Namibia) 2027	Did not qualify							15	6	8	0	1
Total	—N/a	0/14	–	–	–	–	–	118	58	56	0	4

=== Cricket World Cup Qualifier ===
Cricket World Cup Qualifier record
Year	Round	Position	Pld	W	L	T	NR	Qual.
(England) 1979	Semi-finals	3/15	5	4	1	0	0	DNQ
(England) 1982	Did not enter							
(England) 1986	Semi-finals	3/16	7	5	2	0	0	DNQ
(Netherlands) 1990	Second round	6/17	6	3	3	0	0	DNQ
(Kenya) 1994	Plate round	10/20	7	4	3	0	0	DNQ
(Malaysia) 1997	Play-offs	5/22	9	6	2	0	1	DNQ
(Canada) 2001	Super League	8/24	9	4	5	0	0	DNQ
(Ireland) 2005	Play-offs	8/12	7	2	4	0	1	DNQ
(South Africa) 2009	Play-offs	12/12	7	0	7	0	0	DNQ
(New Zealand) 2014	Did not qualify							
(Zimbabwe) 2018	Did not qualify							
(Zimbabwe) 2023	Did not qualify							
(To be determined) 2027	Did not qualify							
Total	0 Titles	8/13	57	28	27	0	2	—N/a

=== CWC Challenge League ===
Cricket World Cup Challenge League record
Year	League	Position	Pld	W	L	T	NR	P/R
2019–2022	A	2/6	15	8	6	0	1	Same position
2024–2026	A	3/6	15	6	8	0	1	Same position
Total	0 Titles	2/2	30	14	14	0	2	—N/a

=== Men's T20 World Cup ===
Men's T20 World Cup record								Qualification record				
Year	Round	Position	Pld	W	L	T	NR	Pld	W	L	T	NR
(South Africa) 2007	Not eligible							Not eligible				
(England) 2009	Not eligible							Not eligible				
(Cricket West Indies) 2010	Not eligible							Not eligible				
(Sri Lanka) 2012	Did not qualify							15	7	8	0	0
(Bangladesh) 2014	Did not qualify							15	6	8	0	1
(India) 2016	Did not qualify							5	4	1	0	0
(United Arab Emirates) (Oman) 2021	Did not qualify							10	7	3	0	0
(Australia) 2022	Did not qualify							6	0	6	0	0
(United States) (Cricket West Indies) 2024	Did not qualify							11	5	6	0	0
(India) (Sri Lanka) 2026	Did not qualify							5	3	1	0	1
(Australia) (New Zealand) 2028	To be determined							5*	5	0	0	0
Total	—N/a	0/10	–	–	–	–	–	72	37	33	0	2

=== T20 World Cup Global Qualifier ===
Men's T20 World Cup Global Qualifier record
Year	Round	Position	Pld	W	L	T	NR	Qual.
(Ireland) 2008	Not eligible							
(United Arab Emirates) 2010	Not eligible							
(United Arab Emirates) 2012	Play-offs	16/16	8	1	7	0	0	DNQ
(United Arab Emirates) 2013	Play-offs	16/16	8	0	7	0	1	DNQ
(Ireland) (Scotland) 2015	Did not qualify							
(United Arab Emirates) 2019	Did not qualify							
(Oman) / (Zimbabwe) 2022	Did not qualify							
(To be determined) 2028	To be determined							
Total	0 Titles	2/7	16	1	14	0	1	—N/a

=== T20 World Cup Europe Regional Final ===
T20 World Cup Europe Regional Final record
Year	Round	Position	Pld	W	L	T	NR	Qual.
(Guernsey) 2019	Round-robin	4/6	5	2	3	0	0	DNQ
(Spain) 2023	Round-robin	4/4	6	0	6	0	0	DNQ
(Scotland) 2023	Round-robin	6/7	6	1	5	0	0	DNQ
(Netherlands) 2025	Did not qualify							
(To be determined) 2027	Qualified							
Total	0 Titles	3/5	17	3	14	0	0	—N/a

=== Other international tournaments ===
World Cricket League (LA/OD/ODI)	Six Nations Challenge (List A)
2007: 4th place (Division Two) (▼); 2011: 5th place (Division Three) (▼); 2012: 4th place (Division Four); 2014: 3rd place (Division Four); 2016: 3rd place (Division Four); 2018: 2nd place (Division Four) (▲); 2018: 5th place (Division Three)	2000: 4th place; 2002: Did not participate; 2004: Did not participate

=== Other regional tournaments ===
T20WC Europe Sub-regional Qualifiers (T20I)	European Cricket Championship (LA/50 overs)	European T20 C'ship Division One (T20)
2018 : Winners (Q); 2022 : Winners (Q); 2024 : Runners-up; 2026 : Winners (Q)	1996: 3rd place; 1998: Runners up; 2000: 6th place (Division One); 2002: 5th place (Division One); 2004: 5th place (Division One); 2006: 4th place (Division One); 2008: 3rd place (Division One)	2011:Winners (Q); 2013: Runners-up (Q); 2015: Runners-up

== Players ==
=== Current squad ===
Updated as on 18 August 2025

This lists all the active players who were part of the Denmark squad for the 2025 Cricket World Cup Challenge League A (Jersey). Players who have played in List A matches but are uncapped in T20Is are listed in italics.

Name	Age	Batting style	Bowling style	Last T20I	Notes
Batsmen
Shangeev Thanikaithasan	28	Right-handed	Right-arm leg break googly	(Norway) 2025	
Hamid Shah	34	Right-handed	Right-arm off break	(Norway) 2025	Captain
Musa Shaheen	22	Right-handed	Right-arm medium	(Norway) 2025	
All-rounders
Surya Anand	28	Right-handed	Right-arm medium	(Norway) 2025	
Lucky Ali	23	Left-handed	Slow left-arm orthodox	(Norway) 2025	
Delawar Khan	29	Right-handed	Left-arm medium	(Norway) 2024	
Mustakin Aslam	18	Right-handed	Right-arm medium	—N/a	
Wicket-keepers
Taranjit Bharaj	33	Right-handed	Right-arm off break	(Norway) 2025	Vice-captain
Sebastian Heath	20	Right-handed	—N/a	—N/a	
Spin bowlers
Abdullah Mahmood	24	Right-handed	Right-arm off break	(Finland) 2025	
Eshan Karimi	21	Right-handed	Slow left-arm orthodox	(Norway) 2025	
Pace bowlers
Saud Munir	27	Right-handed	Right-arm medium	(Sweden) 2025	
Shakeel Zeb	24	Right-handed	Right-arm medium	(Norway) 2025	

=== Other players ===
See List of Denmark List A cricketers and Category:Danish cricketers

The following Danish players have played first-class or List A cricket for teams other than Denmark:

- Amjad Khan
- Thomas Hansen
- Soren Henriksen
- Frederik Klokker
- Johan Malcolm
- Ole Mortensen

== Records ==
International Match Summary — Denmark

Last updated 14 July 2026

Playing Record
Format	M	W	L	T	NR	Inaugural Match
Twenty20 Internationals	54	29	23	0	2	16 June 2019

=== Twenty20 International ===
- Highest team total: 256/5 v. Gibraltar on 29 June 2022 at Royal Brussels Cricket Club, Waterloo.
- Highest individual score: 100, Hamid Shah v. Czech Republic on 21 August 2024 at King George V Sports Ground, Castel.
- Best individual bowling figures: 5/21, Saud Munir v. Norway on 18 May 2023 at Svanholm Park, Brøndby.

Most T20I runs for Denmark

Player	Runs	Average	Career span
Hamid Shah	1,648	40.19	2019–2026
Taranjit Bharaj	843	24.08	2019–2026
Saif Ahmad	732	22.87	2019–2026
Nicolaj Laegsgaard	533	23.17	2019–2024
Musa Shaheen	520	19.25	2019–2026

Most T20I wickets for Denmark

Player	Wickets	Average	Career span
Saif Ahmad	39	16.69	2019–2026
Nicolaj Laegsgaard	33	14.72	2019–2024
Hamid Shah	32	12.59	2019–2026
Surya Anand	29	22.55	2021–2026
Saud Munir	26	15.80	2022–2026
Oliver Hald	26	17.76	2019–2024

T20I record versus other nations

Records complete to T20I #4035. Last updated 14 July 2026.

Opponent	M	W	L	T	NR	First match	First win
vs Full Members
Ireland	1	0	1	0	0	21 July 2023	
vs Associate Members
Austria	1	1	0	0	0	24 July 2023	24 July 2023
Belgium	1	0	1	0	0	1 July 2022	
Cyprus	1	1	0	0	0	27 August 2024	27 August 2024
Czech Republic	1	1	0	0	0	21 August 2024	21 August 2024
Estonia	1	1	0	0	0	8 July 2026	8 July 2026
Finland	8	7	1	0	0	13 July 2019	13 July 2019
Germany	8	3	5	0	0	19 June 2019	19 June 2026
Gibraltar	1	1	0	0	0	29 June 2022	29 June 2022
Greece	1	1	0	0	0	22 August 2024	22 August 2024
Guernsey	3	0	2	0	1	18 June 2019	
Hungary	2	2	0	0	0	28 June 2022	28 June 2022
Italy	5	1	3	0	1	18 June 2019	20 June 2019
Jersey	6	0	6	0	0	16 June 2019	
Norway	4	3	1	0	0	17 June 2019	17 June 2019
Portugal	1	1	0	0	0	4 July 2022	4 July 2022
Romania	1	1	0	0	0	14 July 2026	14 July 2026
Spain	1	1	0	0	0	2 July 2022	2 July 2022
Scotland	1	0	1	0	0	27 July 2023	
Sweden	5	3	2	0	0	14 August 2021	14 August 2021
Turkey	1	1	0	0	0	9 July 2026	9 July 2026

== See also ==
- Denmark national women's cricket team
- List of Denmark List A cricketers
- List of Denmark Twenty20 International cricketers
