= International cricket in 2017 =

The 2017 international cricket season was from May 2017 to September 2017. 13 Test matches, 52 One-day Internationals (ODIs), 12 Twenty20 Internationals (T20Is), and 31 Women's One Day Internationals (WODIs) were played during this period. The season started with India leading the Test cricket rankings, South Africa leading the ODI rankings, New Zealand leading the Twenty20 rankings, and Australia women leading the Women's rankings.

The season started with a two match ODI series between England and Ireland, followed by a tri-nation ODI series in Ireland (also containing New Zealand and Bangladesh), and a three match ODI series between England and South Africa. These matches served as preparation for the ICC Champions Trophy, which was held in England in June. This was the first Champions Trophy that the West Indies did not participate in, due to them having been outside the top 8 in the ODI rankings on the cut-off date of 30 September 2015. This was immediately followed by the Women's Cricket World Cup, which was also held in England. After these two major events, international cricket resumed with many bilateral series that occurred during the rest of the season including Afghanistan's first ever bilateral tour to the West Indies. Important series included the 6th edition of the Basil D'Oliveira Trophy and the 26th edition of the Wisden Trophy, the latter of which included the first day/night Test match to be played in England. Pakistan were scheduled to tour Bangladesh in July, but the series was cancelled. The season also included Zimbabwe's first bilateral tour of Sri Lanka in 15 years, with Zimbabwe recording their first series win over Sri Lanka.

During the season, many important steps of 2019 ICC Cricket World Cup qualification process took place. ODIs between the 12 teams competing in the ICC ODI Championship were of special importance as only those that are ranked in the top 8 at the end of this season (30 September 2017) qualified directly for the World Cup. This was different from previous World Cups, as Full Members were granted automatic qualification in those tournaments. Those ranked in the bottom four will compete in the 2018 Cricket World Cup Qualifier and will be joined by the top four teams in the World Cricket League Championship and the top two teams from World Cricket League Division Two. Matches in rounds 5 and 6 of the World Cricket League Championship and the Intercontinental Cup took place during this season. The World Cricket League Division Three tournament were also held in this season, with the top 2 teams, Oman and Canada, being promoted to Division 2.

Pakistan were also scheduled to tour Bangladesh in July 2017, to play two Test, three ODIs and a T20I match. However, in April 2017, the tour was cancelled.

== Season overview ==
Men's international tours
Start date	Home team	Away team	Results [Matches]				
Start date	Home team	Away team	Test	ODI	T20I	FC	LA
5 May 2017	England	Ireland	—	2–0 [2]	—	—	—
24 May 2017	England	South Africa	3–1 [4]	2–1 [3]	2–1 [3]	—	—
2 June 2017	West Indies	Afghanistan	—	1–1 [3]	3–0 [3]	—	—
6 June 2017	Scotland	Namibia	—	—	—	0–0 [1]	1–1 [2]
15 June 2017	Scotland	Zimbabwe	—	1–1 [2]	—	—	—
20 June 2017	Netherlands	Zimbabwe	—	—	—	—	1–2 [3]
23 June 2017	West Indies	India	—	1–3 [5]	1–0 [1]	—	—
30 June 2017	Sri Lanka	Zimbabwe	1–0 [1]	2–3 [5]	—	—	—
17 July 2017	Netherlands	UAE	—	—	—	—	1–2 [3]
26 July 2017	Sri Lanka	India	0–3 [3]	0–5 [5]	0–1 [1]	—	—
15 August 2017	Ireland	Netherlands	—	—	—	0–0 [1]	—
17 August 2017	England	West Indies	2–1 [3]	4–0 [5]	0–1 [1]	—	—
27 August 2017	Bangladesh	Australia	1–1 [2]	—	—	—	—
12 September 2017	Pakistan	World XI	—	—	2–1 [3]	—	—
13 September 2017	Ireland	West Indies	—	0–0 [1]	—	—	—
16 September 2017	Namibia	UAE	—	—	—	0–1 [1]	1–1 [2]
Men's international tournaments
Start date	Tournament				Winners		
12 May 2017	2017 Ireland Tri-Nation Series				New Zealand		
23 May 2017	(Uganda) 2017 ICC World Cricket League Division Three				Oman		
1 June 2017	(England) 2017 ICC Champions Trophy				Pakistan		
26 July 2017	2017 South Africa A Team Tri-Series				India A		
3 September 2017	(South Africa) 2017 ICC World Cricket League Division Five				Jersey		

Women's international tours
Start date	Home team	Away team	Results [Matches]		
Start date	Home team	Away team	WTest	WODI	WT20I
Women's international tournaments
Start date	Tournament			Winners	
7 May 2017	2017 South Africa Women's Quadrangular Series			India	
24 June 2017	(England) 2017 ICC Women's Cricket World Cup			England	

== Rankings ==
The following are the rankings at the beginning of the season:

ICC Test Championship 18 May 2017
Rank	Team	Matches	Points	Rating
1	India	32	3925	123
2	South Africa	26	3050	117
3	Australia	31	3087	100
4	England	34	3362	99
5	New Zealand	32	3114	97
6	Pakistan	31	2868	93
7	Sri Lanka	31	2836	91
8	West Indies	26	1940	75
9	Bangladesh	17	1171	69
10	Zimbabwe	9	0	0

ICC ODI Championship 1 May 2017
Rank	Team	Matches	Points	Rating
1	South Africa	44	5428	123
2	Australia	46	5442	118
3	India	31	3632	117
4	New Zealand	40	4586	115
5	England	41	4475	109
6	Sri Lanka	46	4273	93
7	Bangladesh	25	2282	91
8	Pakistan	36	3170	88
9	West Indies	30	2355	79
10	Afghanistan	28	1463	52
11	Zimbabwe	36	1640	46
12	Ireland	20	866	43

ICC T20I Championship 2 May 2017
Rank	Team	Matches	Points	Rating
1	New Zealand	13	1625	125
2	England	13	1579	121
3	Pakistan	20	2417	121
4	India	18	2119	118
5	South Africa	15	1668	111
6	Australia	13	1431	110
7	West Indies	15	1639	109
8	Sri Lanka	20	1896	95
9	Afghanistan	22	1974	90
10	Bangladesh	15	1168	78
11	Scotland	11	737	67
12	Zimbabwe	13	842	65
13	United Arab Emirates	16	827	52
14	Netherlands	9	441	49
15	Hong Kong	13	599	46
16	Papua New Guinea	6	235	39
17	Oman	9	345	38
18	Ireland	15	534	36

ICC Women's Rankings 12 April 2017
Rank	Team	Matches	Points	Rating
1	Australia	54	6887	128
2	England	47	5742	122
3	New Zealand	59	7029	119
4	India	47	5221	111
5	West Indies	52	5607	108
6	South Africa	66	5972	90
7	Pakistan	56	4247	76
8	Sri Lanka	53	3576	67
9	Bangladesh	30	1254	42
10	Ireland	27	922	34

== May ==
=== Ireland in England ===
ODI series
No.	Date	Home captain	Away captain	Venue	Result
ODI 3864	5 May	Eoin Morgan	William Porterfield	Bristol County Ground, Bristol	England by 7 wickets
ODI 3865	7 May	Eoin Morgan	William Porterfield	Lord's, London	England by 85 runs

=== 2017 South Africa Women's Quadrangular Series ===
Pos	Team	Pld	W	L	T	NR	BP	Pts	NRR
1	India	6	5	1	0	0	4	24	2.693
2	South Africa	6	5	1	0	0	4	24	2.117
3	Zimbabwe	6	2	4	0	0	0	8	−1.854
4	Ireland	6	0	6	0	0	0	0	−2.687

Group stage
No.	Date	Team 1	Captain 1	Team 2	Captain 2	Venue	Result
1st Match	7 May	South Africa	Suné Luus	Zimbabwe	Sharne Mayers	Senwes Park, Potchefstroom	South Africa by 8 wickets
2nd Match	7 May	India	Mithali Raj	Ireland	Laura Delany	PUK Oval, Potchefstroom	India by 10 wickets
3rd Match	9 May	South Africa	Suné Luus	India	Mithali Raj	PUK Oval, Potchefstroom	India by 7 wickets
4th Match	9 May	Ireland	Laura Delany	Zimbabwe	Sharne Mayers	Senwes Park, Potchefstroom	Zimbabwe by 6 wickets
5th Match	11 May	South Africa	Suné Luus	Ireland	Laura Delany	Senwes Park, Potchefstroom	South Africa by 178 runs
6th Match	11 May	India	Mithali Raj	Zimbabwe	Sharne Mayers	PUK Oval, Potchefstroom	India by 9 wickets
7th Match	15 May	South Africa	Chloe Tryon	Zimbabwe	Sharne Mayers	PUK Oval, Potchefstroom	South Africa by 7 wickets
8th Match	15 May	India	Mithali Raj	Ireland	Laura Delany	Senwes Park, Potchefstroom	India by 249 runs
9th Match	17 May	South Africa	Chloe Tryon	India	Mithali Raj	Senwes Park, Potchefstroom	South Africa by 8 runs
10th Match	17 May	Ireland	Laura Delany	Zimbabwe	Sharne Mayers	PUK Oval, Potchefstroom	Zimbabwe by 5 wickets
11th Match	19 May	South Africa	Chloe Tryon	Ireland	Mary Waldron	PUK Oval, Potchefstroom	South Africa by 120 runs
12th Match	19 May	India	Mithali Raj	Zimbabwe	Sharne Mayers	Senwes Park, Potchefstroom	India by 10 wickets
Final
3rd-Place Playoff	21 May	Ireland	Mary Waldron	Zimbabwe	Sharne Mayers	PUK Oval, Potchefstroom	Ireland by 19 runs
Final	21 May	South Africa	Chloe Tryon	India	Mithali Raj	Senwes Park, Potchefstroom	India by 8 wickets

=== 2017 Ireland Tri-Nation Series ===
Pos	Team	Pld	W	L	T	NR	BP	Pts	NRR
1	New Zealand	4	3	1	0	0	0	12	1.240
2	Bangladesh	4	2	1	0	1	0	10	0.851
3	Ireland	4	0	3	0	1	0	2	−2.589

Source: Cricinfo

Tri-series
No.	Date	Team 1	Captain 1	Team 2	Captain 2	Venue	Result
ODI 3866	12 May	Ireland	William Porterfield	Bangladesh	Shakib Al Hasan	Malahide Cricket Club Ground, Dublin	No result
ODI 3867	14 May	Ireland	William Porterfield	New Zealand	Tom Latham	Malahide Cricket Club Ground, Dublin	New Zealand by 51 runs
ODI 3868	17 May	Bangladesh	Mashrafe Mortaza	New Zealand	Tom Latham	Clontarf Cricket Club Ground, Dublin	New Zealand by 4 wickets
ODI 3869	19 May	Ireland	William Porterfield	Bangladesh	Mashrafe Mortaza	Malahide Cricket Club Ground, Dublin	Bangladesh by 8 wickets
ODI 3870	21 May	Ireland	William Porterfield	New Zealand	Tom Latham	Malahide Cricket Club Ground, Dublin	New Zealand by 190 runs
ODI 3871	24 May	Bangladesh	Mashrafe Mortaza	New Zealand	Tom Latham	Clontarf Cricket Club Ground, Dublin	Bangladesh by 5 wickets

=== 2017 ICC World Cricket League Division Three ===
Pos	Team	Pld	W	L	T	NR	Pts	NRR
1	Oman	5	4	1	0	0	8	1.238
2	Canada	5	3	2	0	0	6	0.817
3	Singapore	5	3	2	0	0	6	−0.410
4	United States	5	2	3	0	0	4	−0.127
5	Uganda	5	2	3	0	0	4	−0.205
6	Malaysia	5	1	4	0	0	2	−1.286

Group stage
No.	Date	Team 1	Captain 1	Team 2	Captain 2	Venue	Result
1st Match	23 May	Uganda	Davis Arinaitwe	Canada	Nitish Kumar	Lugogo Cricket Oval, Lugogo	Canada by 66 runs (DLS)
2nd Match	23 May	Malaysia	Ahmad Faiz	Singapore	Chetan Suryawanshi	Kyambogo Cricket Oval, Kyambogo	Singapore by 7 wickets (DLS)
3rd Match	23 May	United States	Steven Taylor	Oman	Sultan Ahmed	Entebbe Cricket Oval, Entebbe	Oman by 4 wickets (DLS)
4th Match	24 May	Canada	Nitish Kumar	Oman	Sultan Ahmed	Lugogo Cricket Oval, Lugogo	Canada by 83 runs
5th Match	24 May	Malaysia	Ahmad Faiz	United States	Steven Taylor	Kyambogo Cricket Oval, Kyambogo	United States by 6 wickets
6th Match	24 May	Uganda	Davis Arinaitwe	Singapore	Chetan Suryawanshi	Entebbe Cricket Oval, Entebbe	Uganda by 66 runs
7th Match	26 May	Singapore	Chetan Suryawanshi	United States	Steven Taylor	Lugogo Cricket Oval, Lugogo	Singapore by 7 wickets
8th Match	26 May	Uganda	Davis Arinaitwe	Oman	Sultan Ahmed	Kyambogo Cricket Oval, Kyambogo	Oman by 6 wickets
9th Match	26 May	Canada	Nitish Kumar	Malaysia	Ahmad Faiz	Entebbe Cricket Oval, Entebbe	Malaysia by 6 wickets
10th Match	27 May	Uganda	Davis Arinaitwe	Malaysia	Ahmad Faiz	Lugogo Cricket Oval, Lugogo	Uganda by 4 wickets
11th Match	27 May	Canada	Nitish Kumar	United States	Steven Taylor	Kyambogo Cricket Oval, Kyambogo	Canada by 96 runs
12th Match	27 May	Oman	Sultan Ahmed	Singapore	Chetan Suryawanshi	Entebbe Cricket Oval, Entebbe	Oman by 5 wickets
13th Match	29 May	Malaysia	Ahmad Faiz	Oman	Sultan Ahmed	Lugogo Cricket Oval, Lugogo	Oman by 131 runs
14th Match	29 May	Canada	Nitish Kumar	Singapore	Chetan Suryawanshi	Kyambogo Cricket Oval, Kyambogo	Singapore by 2 runs
15th Match	29 May	Uganda	Davis Arinaitwe	United States	Steven Taylor	Entebbe Cricket Oval, Entebbe	United States by 13 runs
Playoffs
Fifth-place playoff	30 May	Uganda	Davis Arinaitwe	Malaysia	Ahmad Faiz	Lugogo Cricket Oval, Lugogo	Match abandoned
Third-place playoff	30 May	Singapore	Chetan Suryawanshi	United States	Steven Taylor	Kyambogo Cricket Oval, Kyambogo	No result
First-place playoff	30 May	Canada	Nitish Kumar	Oman	Sultan Ahmed	Entebbe Cricket Oval, Entebbe	No result

==== Final standings ====
Pos	Team	Status
1st	Oman	Promoted to Division Two for 2018
2nd	Canada	Promoted to Division Two for 2018
3rd	Singapore	Remained in Division Three
4th	United States	Remained in Division Three
5th	Uganda	Relegated to Division Four for 2018
6th	Malaysia	Relegated to Division Four for 2018

=== South Africa in England ===
ODI series
No.	Date	Home captain	Away captain	Venue	Result
ODI 3872	24 May	Eoin Morgan	AB de Villiers	Headingley, Leeds	England by 72 runs
ODI 3873	27 May	Eoin Morgan	AB de Villiers	Rose Bowl, Southampton	England by 2 runs
ODI 3874	29 May	Eoin Morgan	AB de Villiers	Lord's, London	South Africa by 7 wickets
T20I series
No.	Date	Home captain	Away captain	Venue	Result
T20I 614	21 June	Eoin Morgan	AB de Villiers	Rose Bowl, Southampton	England by 9 wickets
T20I 615	23 June	Eoin Morgan	AB de Villiers	County Ground, Taunton	South Africa by 3 runs
T20I 616	25 June	Jos Buttler	AB de Villiers	Sophia Gardens, Cardiff	England by 19 runs
2017 Basil D'Oliveira Trophy - Test series
No.	Date	Home captain	Away captain	Venue	Result
Test 2262	6–10 July	Joe Root	Dean Elgar	Lord's, London	England by 211 runs
Test 2264	14–18 July	Joe Root	Faf du Plessis	Trent Bridge, Nottingham	South Africa by 340 runs
Test 2266	27–31 July	Joe Root	Faf du Plessis	The Oval, London	England by 239 runs
Test 2268	4–8 August	Joe Root	Faf du Plessis	Old Trafford, Manchester	England by 177 runs

== June ==
=== 2017 ICC Champions Trophy ===
Pos	Team	Pld	W	L	T	NR	Pts	NRR
1	England	3	3	0	0	0	6	1.045
2	Bangladesh	3	1	1	0	1	3	0.000
3	Australia	3	0	1	0	2	2	−0.992
4	New Zealand	3	0	2	0	1	1	−1.058

Source: ESPN Cricinfo

Advanced to knock-out stage

Pos	Team	Pld	W	L	T	NR	Pts	NRR
1	India	3	2	1	0	0	4	1.370
2	Pakistan	3	2	1	0	0	4	−0.680
3	South Africa	3	1	2	0	0	2	0.167
4	Sri Lanka	3	1	2	0	0	2	−0.798

Source: ESPN Cricinfo

Advanced to knock-out stage

Group stage
No.	Date	Team 1	Captain 1	Team 2	Captain 2	Venue	Result
ODI 3875	1 June	England	Eoin Morgan	Bangladesh	Mashrafe Mortaza	The Oval, London	England by 8 wickets
ODI 3876	2 June	Australia	Steve Smith	New Zealand	Kane Williamson	Edgbaston Cricket Ground, Birmingham	No result
ODI 3877	3 June	Sri Lanka	Upul Tharanga	South Africa	AB de Villiers	The Oval, London	South Africa by 96 runs
ODI 3878	4 June	India	Virat Kohli	Pakistan	Sarfaraz Ahmed	Edgbaston Cricket Ground, Birmingham	India by 124 runs (DLS)
ODI 3879	5 June	Australia	Steve Smith	Bangladesh	Mashrafe Mortaza	The Oval, London	No result
ODI 3880	6 June	England	Eoin Morgan	New Zealand	Kane Williamson	Sophia Gardens, Cardiff	England by 87 runs
ODI 3881	7 June	Pakistan	Sarfaraz Ahmed	South Africa	AB de Villiers	Edgbaston Cricket Ground, Birmingham	Pakistan by 19 runs (DLS)
ODI 3882	8 June	India	Virat Kohli	Sri Lanka	Angelo Mathews	The Oval, London	Sri Lanka by 7 wickets
ODI 3883	9 June	New Zealand	Kane Williamson	Bangladesh	Mashrafe Mortaza	Sophia Gardens, Cardiff	Bangladesh by 5 wickets
ODI 3885	10 June	England	Eoin Morgan	Australia	Steve Smith	Edgbaston Cricket Ground, Birmingham	England by 40 runs (DLS)
ODI 3886	11 June	India	Virat Kohli	South Africa	AB de Villiers	The Oval, London	India by 8 wickets
ODI 3888	12 June	Sri Lanka	Angelo Mathews	Pakistan	Sarfaraz Ahmed	Sophia Gardens, Cardiff	Pakistan by 3 wickets
Knockout stage
ODI 3889	14 June	England	Eoin Morgan	Pakistan	Sarfaraz Ahmed	Sophia Gardens, Cardiff	Pakistan by 8 wickets
ODI 3891	15 June	Bangladesh	Mashrafe Mortaza	India	Virat Kohli	Edgbaston Cricket Ground, Birmingham	India by 9 wickets
ODI 3894	18 June	India	Virat Kohli	Pakistan	Sarfaraz Ahmed	The Oval, London	Pakistan by 180 runs

=== Afghanistan in West Indies ===
T20I series
No.	Date	Home captain	Away captain	Venue	Result
T20I 611	2 June	Carlos Brathwaite	Asghar Stanikzai	Warner Park, Basseterre	West Indies by 6 wickets
T20I 612	3 June	Carlos Brathwaite	Asghar Stanikzai	Warner Park, Basseterre	West Indies by 29 runs (DLS)
T20I 613	5 June	Carlos Brathwaite	Asghar Stanikzai	Warner Park, Basseterre	West Indies by 7 wickets
ODI series
No.	Date	Home captain	Away captain	Venue	Result
ODI 3884	9 June	Jason Holder	Asghar Stanikzai	Daren Sammy Cricket Ground, Gros Islet	Afghanistan by 63 runs
ODI 3887	11 June	Jason Holder	Asghar Stanikzai	Daren Sammy Cricket Ground, Gros Islet	West Indies by 4 wickets
ODI 3890	14 June	Jason Holder	Asghar Stanikzai	Daren Sammy Cricket Ground, Gros Islet	No result

=== Namibia in Scotland ===
2015–17 ICC Intercontinental Cup - FC series
No.	Date	Home captain	Away captain	Venue	Result
First-class	6–9 June	Kyle Coetzer	Sarel Burger	Cambusdoon New Ground, Ayr	Match drawn
2015–17 ICC World Cricket League Championship - List A series
No.	Date	Home captain	Away captain	Venue	Result
List A	11 June	Kyle Coetzer	Sarel Burger	The Grange Club, Edinburgh	Scotland by 51 runs (DLS)
List A	13 June	Kyle Coetzer	Sarel Burger	The Grange Club, Edinburgh	Namibia by 50 runs

=== Zimbabwe in Scotland ===
ODI series
No.	Date	Home captain	Away captain	Venue	Result
ODI 3892	15 June	Kyle Coetzer	Graeme Cremer	The Grange Club, Edinburgh	Scotland by 26 runs (DLS)
ODI 3893	17 June	Kyle Coetzer	Graeme Cremer	The Grange Club, Edinburgh	Zimbabwe by 6 wickets

=== Zimbabwe in Netherlands ===
List A series
No.	Date	Home captain	Away captain	Venue	Result
1st List A	20 June	Peter Borren	Graeme Cremer	VRA Cricket Ground, Amstelveen	Zimbabwe by 6 wickets
2nd List A	22 June	Peter Borren	Graeme Cremer	VRA Cricket Ground, Amstelveen	Zimbabwe by 6 wickets (DLS)
3rd List A	24 June	Peter Borren	Graeme Cremer	Sportpark Westvliet, The Hague	Netherlands by 149 runs

=== India in West Indies ===
ODI series
No.	Date	Home captain	Away captain	Venue	Result
ODI 3895	23 June	Jason Holder	Virat Kohli	Queen's Park Oval, Port of Spain	No result
ODI 3896	25 June	Jason Holder	Virat Kohli	Queen's Park Oval, Port of Spain	India by 105 runs
ODI 3898	30 June	Jason Holder	Virat Kohli	Sir Vivian Richards Stadium, North Sound	India by 93 runs
ODI 3900	2 July	Jason Holder	Virat Kohli	Sir Vivian Richards Stadium, North Sound	West Indies by 11 runs
ODI 3902	6 July	Jason Holder	Virat Kohli	Sabina Park, Kingston	India by 8 wickets
T20I series
No.	Date	Home captain	Away captain	Venue	Result
T20I 617	9 July	Carlos Brathwaite	Virat Kohli	Sabina Park, Kingston	West Indies by 9 wickets

=== 2017 Women's Cricket World Cup ===
Pos	Team	Pld	W	L	T	NR	Pts	NRR
1	England (H, C)	7	6	1	0	0	12	1.295
2	Australia	7	6	1	0	0	12	1.004
3	India (R)	7	5	2	0	0	10	0.669
4	South Africa	7	4	2	0	1	9	1.183
5	New Zealand	7	3	3	0	1	7	0.309
6	West Indies	7	2	5	0	0	4	−1.522
7	Sri Lanka	7	1	6	0	0	2	−1.099
8	Pakistan	7	0	7	0	0	0	−1.930

(C) Champions; (H) Host; (R) Runners-up

Group stage
No.	Date	Team 1	Captain 1	Team 2	Captain 2	Venue	Result
WODI 1056	24 June	New Zealand	Suzie Bates	Sri Lanka	Inoka Ranaweera	Bristol County Ground, Bristol	New Zealand by 9 wickets
WODI 1057	24 June	England	Heather Knight	India	Mithali Raj	County Ground, Derby	India by 35 runs
WODI 1058	25 June	Pakistan	Sana Mir	South Africa	Dane van Niekerk	Grace Road, Leicester	South Africa by 3 wickets
WODI 1059	26 June	Australia	Meg Lanning	West Indies	Stafanie Taylor	County Ground, Taunton	Australia by 8 wickets
WODI 1060	27 June	England	Heather Knight	Pakistan	Sana Mir	Grace Road, Leicester	England by 107 runs (DLS)
WODI 1060a	28 June	South Africa	Dane van Niekerk	New Zealand	Suzie Bates	County Ground, Derby	Match abandoned
WODI 1061	29 June	West Indies	Stafanie Taylor	India	Mithali Raj	County Ground, Taunton	India by 7 wickets
WODI 1062	29 June	Sri Lanka	Inoka Ranaweera	Australia	Meg Lanning	Bristol County Ground, Bristol	Australia by 8 wickets
WODI 1063	2 July	England	Heather Knight	Sri Lanka	Inoka Ranaweera	County Ground, Taunton	England by 7 wickets
WODI 1064	2 July	Australia	Meg Lanning	New Zealand	Suzie Bates	Bristol County Ground, Bristol	Australia by 5 wickets
WODI 1065	2 July	India	Mithali Raj	Pakistan	Sana Mir	County Ground, Derby	India by 95 runs
WODI 1066	2 July	South Africa	Dane van Niekerk	West Indies	Stafanie Taylor	Grace Road, Leicester	South Africa by 10 wickets
WODI 1067	5 July	England	Heather Knight	South Africa	Dane van Niekerk	Bristol County Ground, Bristol	England by 68 runs
WODI 1068	5 July	India	Mithali Raj	Sri Lanka	Inoka Ranaweera	County Ground, Derby	India by 16 runs
WODI 1069	5 July	Australia	Rachael Haynes	Pakistan	Sana Mir	Grace Road, Leicester	Australia by 159 runs
WODI 1070	6 July	New Zealand	Suzie Bates	West Indies	Stafanie Taylor	County Ground, Taunton	New Zealand by 8 wickets
WODI 1071	8 July	New Zealand	Suzie Bates	Pakistan	Sana Mir	County Ground, Taunton	New Zealand by 8 wickets
WODI 1072	8 July	India	Mithali Raj	South Africa	Dane van Niekerk	Grace Road, Leicester	South Africa by 115 runs
WODI 1073	9 July	England	Heather Knight	Australia	Meg Lanning	Bristol County Ground, Bristol	England by 3 runs
WODI 1074	9 July	Sri Lanka	Inoka Ranaweera	West Indies	Stafanie Taylor	County Ground, Derby	West Indies by 47 runs
WODI 1075	11 July	Pakistan	Sana Mir	West Indies	Stafanie Taylor	Grace Road, Leicester	West Indies by 19 runs (DLS)
WODI 1076	12 July	South Africa	Dane van Niekerk	Sri Lanka	Inoka Ranaweera	County Ground, Taunton	South Africa by 8 wickets
WODI 1077	12 July	Australia	Meg Lanning	India	Mithali Raj	Bristol County Ground, Bristol	Australia by 8 wickets
WODI 1078	12 July	England	Heather Knight	New Zealand	Suzie Bates	County Ground, Derby	England won by 75 runs
WODI 1079	15 July	Australia	Rachael Haynes	South Africa	Dane van Niekerk	County Ground, Taunton	Australia by 59 runs
WODI 1080	15 July	England	Heather Knight	West Indies	Stafanie Taylor	Bristol County Ground, Bristol	England by 92 runs
WODI 1081	15 July	India	Mithali Raj	New Zealand	Suzie Bates	County Ground, Derby	India by 186 runs
WODI 1082	15 July	Pakistan	Sana Mir	Sri Lanka	Inoka Ranaweera	Grace Road, Leicester	Sri Lanka by 15 runs
Knockout stage
WODI 1083	18 July	England	Heather Knight	South Africa	Dane van Niekerk	Bristol County Ground, Bristol	England by 2 wickets
WODI 1084	20 July	Australia	Meg Lanning	India	Mithali Raj	County Ground, Derby	India by 36 runs
WODI 1085	23 July	England	Heather Knight	India	Mithali Raj	Lord's, London	England by 9 runs

=== Zimbabwe in Sri Lanka ===
ODI series
No.	Date	Home captain	Away captain	Venue	Result
ODI 3897	30 June	Angelo Mathews	Graeme Cremer	Galle International Stadium, Galle	Zimbabwe by 6 wickets
ODI 3899	2 July	Angelo Mathews	Graeme Cremer	Galle International Stadium, Galle	Sri Lanka by 7 wickets
ODI 3901	6 July	Angelo Mathews	Graeme Cremer	Mahinda Rajapaksa International Cricket Stadium, Hambantota	Sri Lanka by 8 wickets
ODI 3903	8 July	Angelo Mathews	Graeme Cremer	Mahinda Rajapaksa International Cricket Stadium, Hambantota	Zimbabwe by 4 wickets (DLS)
ODI 3904	10 July	Angelo Mathews	Graeme Cremer	Mahinda Rajapaksa International Cricket Stadium, Hambantota	Zimbabwe by 3 wickets
Test series
No.	Date	Home captain	Away captain	Venue	Result
Test 2263	14–18 July	Dinesh Chandimal	Graeme Cremer	R. Premadasa Stadium, Colombo	Sri Lanka by 4 wickets

== July ==
=== United Arab Emirates in Netherlands ===
List A series
No.	Date	Home captain	Away captain	Venue	Result
1st List A	17 July	Peter Borren	Rohan Mustafa	VRA Cricket Ground, Amstelveen	United Arab Emirates by 3 wickets
2nd List A	19 July	Peter Borren	Rohan Mustafa	VRA Cricket Ground, Amstelveen	United Arab Emirates by 5 wickets
3rd List A	20 July	Peter Borren	Rohan Mustafa	Sportpark Westvliet, Voorburg	Netherlands by 1 wicket (DLS)

=== India in Sri Lanka ===
Test series
No.	Date	Home captain	Away captain	Venue	Result
Test 2265	26–30 July	Rangana Herath	Virat Kohli	Galle International Stadium, Galle	India by 304 runs
Test 2267	3–7 August	Dinesh Chandimal	Virat Kohli	Sinhalese Sports Club Ground, Colombo	India by an innings and 53 runs
Test 2269	12–16 August	Dinesh Chandimal	Virat Kohli	Pallekele International Cricket Stadium, Pallekele	India by an innings and 171 runs
ODI series
No.	Date	Home captain	Away captain	Venue	Result
ODI 3905	20 August	Upul Tharanga	Virat Kohli	Rangiri Dambulla International Stadium, Dambulla	India by 9 wickets
ODI 3906	24 August	Upul Tharanga	Virat Kohli	Pallekele International Cricket Stadium, Pallekele	India by 3 wickets (DLS)
ODI 3907	27 August	Chamara Kapugedera	Virat Kohli	Pallekele International Cricket Stadium, Pallekele	India by 6 wickets
ODI 3908	31 August	Lasith Malinga	Virat Kohli	R. Premadasa Stadium, Colombo	India by 168 runs
ODI 3909	3 September	Upul Tharanga	Virat Kohli	R. Premadasa Stadium, Colombo	India by 6 wickets
T20I series
No.	Date	Home captain	Away captain	Venue	Result
T20I 618	6 September	Upul Tharanga	Virat Kohli	R. Premadasa Stadium, Colombo	India by 7 wickets

=== 2017 South Africa A Team Tri-Series ===
List A series
No.	Date	Team 1	Captain 1	Team 2	Captain 2	Venue	Result
1st List A	26 July	South Africa A	Khaya Zondo	India A	Manish Pandey	Groenkloof Oval, Pretoria	South Africa A by 2 wickets
2nd List A	28 July	Afghanistan A	Shafiqullah	India A	Manish Pandey	LC de Villiers Oval, Pretoria	India A by 7 wickets
3rd List A	30 July	South Africa A	Khaya Zondo	Afghanistan A	Shafiqullah	Groenkloof Stadium, Pretoria	South Africa A by 164 runs
4th List A	1 August	Afghanistan A	Afsar Zazai	India A	Manish Pandey	LC de Villiers Oval, Pretoria	India A by 113 runs
5th List A	3 August	South Africa A	Khaya Zondo	India A	Manish Pandey	LC de Villiers Oval, Pretoria	India A by 1 wicket
6th List A	5 August	South Africa A	Khaya Zondo	Afghanistan A	Shafiqullah	LC de Villiers Oval, Pretoria	South Africa A by 7 wickets
Final	8 August	South Africa A	Khaya Zondo	India A	Manish Pandey	LC de Villiers Oval, Pretoria	India A by 7 wickets
First-class series
No.	Date	Team 1	Captain 1	Team 2	Captain 2	Venue	Result
1st match	12–15 August	South Africa A	Aiden Markram	India A	Karun Nair	Willowmoore Park, Benoni	South Africa A by 235 runs
2nd match	19–22 August	South Africa A	Aiden Markram	India A	Karun Nair	Groenkloof Stadium, Pretoria	India A by 6 wickets

== August ==
=== Netherlands in Ireland ===
2015–17 ICC Intercontinental Cup - FC series
No.	Date	Home captain	Away captain	Venue	Result
First-class	15–18 August	William Porterfield	Peter Borren	Malahide Cricket Ground, Dublin	Match drawn

=== West Indies in England ===
2017 Wisden Trophy - Test series
No.	Date	Home captain	Away captain	Venue	Result
Test 2270	17–21 August	Joe Root	Jason Holder	Edgbaston, Birmingham	England by an innings and 209 runs
Test 2271	25–29 August	Joe Root	Jason Holder	Headingley, Leeds	West Indies by 5 wickets
Test 2274	7–11 September	Joe Root	Jason Holder	Lord's, London	England by 9 wickets
T20I series
No.	Date	Home captain	Away captain	Venue	Result
T20I 622	16 September	Eoin Morgan	Carlos Brathwaite	Riverside Ground, Chester-le-Street	West Indies by 21 runs
ODI series
No.	Date	Home captain	Away captain	Venue	Result
ODI 3911	19 September	Eoin Morgan	Jason Holder	Old Trafford, Manchester	England by 7 wickets
ODI 3913	21 September	Eoin Morgan	Jason Holder	Trent Bridge, Nottingham	No result
ODI 3915	24 September	Eoin Morgan	Jason Holder	County Ground, Bristol	England by 124 runs
ODI 3916	27 September	Eoin Morgan	Jason Holder	The Oval, London	England by 6 runs (DLS)
ODI 3918	29 September	Eoin Morgan	Jason Mohammed	Rose Bowl, Southampton	England by 9 wickets

=== Australia in Bangladesh ===
Test series
No.	Date	Home captain	Away captain	Venue	Result
Test 2272	27–31 August	Mushfiqur Rahim	Steve Smith	Sher-e-Bangla National Cricket Stadium, Dhaka	Bangladesh by 20 runs
Test 2273	4–8 September	Mushfiqur Rahim	Steve Smith	Zohur Ahmed Chowdhury Stadium, Chittagong	Australia by 7 wickets

== September ==
=== 2017 ICC World Cricket League Division Five ===
Group A
Pos	Team	Pld	W	L	T	NR	Pts	NRR
1	Italy	3	3	0	0	0	6	1.466
2	Qatar	3	2	1	0	0	4	0.431
3	Guernsey	3	1	2	0	0	2	0.048
4	Cayman Islands	3	0	3	0	0	0	−2.030

Group B
Pos	Team	Pld	W	L	T	NR	Pts	NRR
1	Jersey	3	3	0	0	0	6	1.473
2	Vanuatu	3	1	2	0	0	2	−0.384
3	Germany	3	1	2	0	0	2	−0.612
4	Ghana	3	1	2	0	0	2	−0.670

Group stage
No.	Date	Team 1	Captain 1	Team 2	Captain 2	Venue	Result
1st Match	3 September	Cayman Islands	Ramon Sealy	Qatar	Inam-ul-Haq	Willowmoore Park, Benoni	Qatar by 93 runs
2nd Match	3 September	Italy	Gayashan Munasinghe	Guernsey	Jamie Nussbaumer	Willowmoore A, Benoni	Italy by 48 runs
3rd Match	3 September	Jersey	Charles Perchard	Vanuatu	Andrew Mansale	Willowmoore B, Benoni	Jersey by 6 wickets
4th Match	3 September	Ghana	Peter Ananya	Germany	Rishi Pillai	Willowmoore C, Benoni	Germany by 1 wicket
5th Match	4 September	Guernsey	Jamie Nussbaumer	Cayman Islands	Ramon Sealy	Willowmoore B, Benoni	Guernsey by 6 wickets
6th Match	4 September	Italy	Gayashan Munasinghe	Qatar	Inam-ul-Haq	Willowmoore C, Benoni	Italy by 6 wickets
7th Match	4 September	Jersey	Charles Perchard	Germany	Rishi Pillai	Willowmoore Park, Benoni	Jersey by 5 wickets
8th Match	4 September	Vanuatu	Andrew Mansale	Ghana	Peter Ananya	Willowmoore A, Benoni	Ghana by 2 wickets
9th Match	6 September	Guernsey	Jamie Nussbaumer	Qatar	Inam-ul-Haq	Willowmoore Park, Benoni	Qatar by 3 wickets
10th Match	6 September	Italy	Gayashan Munasinghe	Cayman Islands	Ramon Sealy	Willowmoore A, Benoni	Italy by 122 runs
11th Match	6 September	Jersey	Charles Perchard	Ghana	Peter Ananya	Willowmoore B, Benoni	Jersey by 108 runs
12th Match	6 September	Vanuatu	Andrew Mansale	Germany	Rishi Pillai	Willowmoore C, Benoni	Vanuatu by 4 wickets
Semi-finals
13th Match	7 September	Guernsey	Jamie Nussbaumer	Ghana	Peter Ananya	Willowmoore Park, Benoni	Guernsey by 23 runs
14th Match	7 September	Germany	Rishi Pillai	Cayman Islands	Ramon Sealy	Willowmoore A, Benoni	Germany by 5 wickets
15th Match	7 September	Italy	Gayashan Munasinghe	Vanuatu	Andrew Mansale	Willowmoore B, Benoni	Vanuatu by 6 wickets
16th Match	7 September	Jersey	Charles Perchard	Qatar	Inam-ul-Haq	Willowmoore C, Benoni	Jersey by 7 wickets
Playoffs
Seventh-place playoff	9 September	Cayman Islands	Ramon Sealy	Ghana	Peter Ananya	Willowmoore C, Benoni	Ghana by 6 wickets
Fifth-place playoff	9 September	Germany	Rishi Pillai	Guernsey	Jamie Nussbaumer	Willowmoore B, Benoni	Germany by 4 wickets
Third-place playoff	9 September	Qatar	Inam-ul-Haq	Italy	Gayashan Munasinghe	Willowmoore A, Benoni	Qatar by 3 wickets
First-place playoff	9 September	Vanuatu	Andrew Mansale	Jersey	Charles Perchard	Willowmoore Park, Benoni	Jersey by 120 runs

==== Final standings ====
Pos	Team	Status
1st	Jersey	Promoted to Division Four for 2018
2nd	Vanuatu	Promoted to Division Four for 2018
3rd	Qatar	Remained in Division Five
4th	Italy	Relegated to regional competitions
5th	Germany	Relegated to regional competitions
6th	Guernsey	Relegated to regional competitions
7th	Ghana	Relegated to regional competitions
8th	Cayman Islands	Relegated to regional competitions

=== 2017 Independence Cup ===
T20I series
No.	Date	Home captain	Away captain	Venue	Result
T20I 619	12 September	Sarfaraz Ahmed	Faf du Plessis	Gaddafi Stadium, Lahore	Pakistan by 20 runs
T20I 620	13 September	Sarfaraz Ahmed	Faf du Plessis	Gaddafi Stadium, Lahore	World XI won by 7 wickets
T20I 621	15 September	Sarfaraz Ahmed	Faf du Plessis	Gaddafi Stadium, Lahore	Pakistan by 33 runs

=== West Indies in Ireland ===
ODI series
No.	Date	Home captain	Away captain	Venue	Result
ODI 3909a	13 September	William Porterfield	Jason Holder	Stormont Cricket Ground, Belfast	Match abandoned

=== United Arab Emirates in Namibia ===
2015–17 ICC Intercontinental Cup - FC series
No.	Date	Home captain	Away captain	Venue	Result
First-class	16–19 September	Sarel Burger	Rohan Mustafa	Wanderers Cricket Ground, Windhoek	United Arab Emirates by 34 runs
2015–17 ICC World Cricket League Championship - List A series
No.	Date	Home captain	Away captain	Venue	Result
1st List A	21 September	Sarel Burger	Rohan Mustafa	Wanderers Cricket Ground, Windhoek	United Arab Emirates by 6 wickets
2nd List A	23 September	Sarel Burger	Rohan Mustafa	Wanderers Cricket Ground, Windhoek	Namibia by 4 wickets
