= 2012 Africa Twenty20 Division Two =

2012 ICC Africa Twenty20 Division Two
- Administrator: International Cricket Council
- Cricket format: Twenty20
- Tournament format: Round-robin
- Host: South Africa
- Champions: Botswana
- Participants: 8
- Matches: 28
- Most runs: (Tanzania) Abhik Patwa (271)
- Most wickets: (Tanzania) Benson Mwita (13)
- Official website: Cricinfo

2012 ICC Africa Twenty20 Division Two was a Twenty20 cricket tournament that took place in 2012 and formed part of qualifying for the 2014 ICC World Twenty20. South Africa hosted the event, with Botswana winning it.

== Teams ==
Teams that qualified are as follows:-

- Botswana
- Tanzania
- Ghana
- Mozambique
- Swaziland
- Sierra Leone
- Zambia (promoted)
- Seychelles (promoted)

== Squads ==
Botswana	Ghana	Mozambique	Seychelles
Karabo Modise (c); Noor Ahmad; Omar Ali; Manan Barot; Akrum Chand; Mosa Gaolekwe; Nabil Master; Saad Mohyuddin; Karabo Motlhanka; Hasantha Mudiyanselage; Segolame Ramatu; Faisal Rana; Denzil Sequeira (Wk); Waseem Tajbhay	Peter Ananya (C); Isaac Aboagye; Moses Anafie; Lawrence Ateak; Vincent Ateak; Samson Awiah; Kofi Bagabena; Godfrey Bakiweyem; Frank Baleri; Matthew Bawa; Obed Harvey; Julius Mensah (wk); Abdul-Karim Sumaila; James Vifah (wk)	Reuben Bragge; Acacio Chitsondzo; Damiao Couana; Atishay Gupta; Ramalingam Karthick (wk); Hemen Kotecha; Christiaan Louw; Bhekemuzi Nkosi; Ramesh Pania (wk); Syed Shah; Mohammad Shahzad; Mathew Singh; Quicho Zefanias	Kaushalkumar Patel (c); Pradeep Dewage (wk); Muditha Gunatilake; Sohan Halpe; Anthony Hayman; Dharmesh Hirani; Tim Horpinitch; Harikrishnan Kamalan; Sanjay Kunder; Arvind Nanji; Janaka Rathnayake; Tharmenthiran Shanmugam; Dhiraj Varsani; Mukesh Vadodariya

Sierra Leone	Eswatini	Tanzania	Zambia
Lansana Lamin (c); Brima Ansumana; Abass Gbla; Ibrahim Kamara; Mohamed Kamara; Sheka Kamara; George Kpundeh; Ibrahim Mansaray (Wk); Jacob Mansaray; Edward Marrah; Emmanuel Pessima; Julius Quee; Alvin Williams; Solomon Williams	Saif Ullah (c); Naeem Gull (Wk); Junain Hansrod (Wk); Ahmed Hasan; Syed Hasan; Hansrod Ibrahim; Shahzad Mahmood; Delisa Malinga; Aziz Patel; Idris Patel; Haris Rashid; Tarun Sandeep; Eastian Sauerman; Jason Wade	Hamisi Abdallah (C); Rashidi Amiri; Zamayoni Jabeneke; Tambwe Juma; Issa Kikasi (Wk); Ally Kimote; Riziki Kiseto; Nasibu Mapunda; Benson Mwita; Kassim Nassoro; Abhik Patwa (Wk); Shukri Abdul Rahim; Khalil Rehemtulla; Nassoro Saidi	Imran Mohamed (c); Samir Bagus; Irfan Galiya; Godfrey Kandela; Mohmed Mitha; Nicholas Mubanga; Feroz Munshi; Allan Nsensha (Wk); Tapson Nyirongo; Abid Patel; Himal Patel; Sarfraz Patel; Sarfaraz Sopariya; Sharif Yousuf

== Fixtures ==
=== Group stage ===
==== Points table ====
Team	P	W	L	T	NR	Pts	NRR
Botswana	7	6	1	0	0	12	+1.843
Tanzania	7	6	1	0	0	12	+1.675
Zambia	7	6	1	0	0	12	+1.002
Ghana	7	3	4	0	0	6	+0.918
Seychelles	7	3	4	0	0	6	–0.605
Mozambique	7	2	5	0	0	4	–1.263
Eswatini	7	1	6	0	0	2	–1.523
Sierra Leone	7	1	6	0	0	2	–2.067

Qualified for 2013 Africa Division One
Qualified for 2014 Africa Division Two
Relegated to 2014 Africa Division Three

==== Matches ====
1 October
Scorecard

Botswana; 181/5 (20 overs)	v	Zambia; 138/9 (20 overs)
Denzil Sequeira 77 (55); Imran Mohamed 1/27 (2 overs)		Sarfraz Patel 28 (18); Noor Ahmad 2/18 (4 overs)

Botswana won by 43 runs
Willowmoore Park B Field, Benoni
Umpires: Jannie Bedford (RSA) and Patric Makumbi (Uga)
Player of the match: Karabo Modise (Bot)

- Zambia won the toss and elected to field.

1 October
Scorecard

Ghana; 130/7 (20 overs)	v	Tanzania; 131/5 (18.1 overs)
James Vifah 40 (43); Benson Mwita 5/13 (4 overs)		Abhik Patwa 81* (53); Lawrence Ateak 2/11 (2.2 overs)

Tanzania won by 5 wickets
Willowmoore Park B Field, Benoni
Umpires: Wayne Dollar (RSA) and Claude Thorborn (Nam)
Player of the match: Benson Mwita (Tan)

- Ghana won the toss and elected to bat.

1 October
Scorecard

Sierra Leone; 107/7 (20 overs)	v	Mozambique; 108/4 (17 overs)
Mohamed Kamara 28 (32); Bineesh Vadavathy 2/7 (2 overs)		Mohammad Shahzad 25 (33); Ibrahim Kamara 2/29 (3 overs)

Mozambique won by 6 wickets
Willowmoore Park B Field, Benoni
Umpires: Emmanuel Byiringiro (Rwanda) and Munir Khan (Kenya)
Player of the match: Bineesh Vadavathy (Moz)

- Mozambique won the toss and chose to field

1 October
Scorecard

Seychelles; 151/4 (20 overs)	v	Swaziland; 155/4 (17.3 overs)
Harikrishnan Kamalan 46 (29); Shahzad Mahmood 1/23 (4 overs)		Naeem Gull 42 (27); Arvind Nanji 1/20 (1.3 overs)

Swaziland won by 6 wickets
Willowmoore Park B Field, Benoni
Umpires: Rocky D'Mello (Kenya) and Bhongolwethu Makaleni (RSA)
Player of the match: Naeem Gull (Swz)

- Swaziland won the toss and elected to field.

1 October
Scorecard

Botswana; 134/9 (20 overs)	v	Swaziland; 115/9 (20 overs)
Karabo Modise 38 (35); Aziz Patel 4/29 (4 overs)		Shahzad Mahmood 35* (24); Omar Ali 2/32 (5 overs)

Botswana won by 19 runs
Willowmoore Park B Field, Benoni
Umpires: Wayne Dollar (RSA) and Patric Makumbi (Uga)
Player of the match: N/A

- Botswana won the toss and chose to bat

1 October
Scorecard

Ghana; 148/7 (20 overs)	v	Mozambique; 95 (16.5 overs)
Obed Harvey 56 (41); Bhekemuzi Nkosi 3/26 (4 overs)		Mathew Singh 22 (13); Isaac Aboagye 3/27 (3 overs)

Ghana won by 53 runs
Willowmoore Park B Field, Benoni
Umpires: Emmanuel Byiringiro (Rwa) and Bhongolwethu Makaleni (RSA)
Player of the match: N/A

- Ghana won the toss and elected to bat

1 October
Scorecard

Seychelles; 111 (19.5 overs)	v	Zambia; 114/4 (14.4 overs)
Janaka Rathnayake 42 (33); Mohmed Mitha 3/16 (4 overs)		Sarfraz Patel 28 (34); Kaushalkumar Patel 3/32 (4 overs)

Zambia won by 6 wickets
Willowmoore Park B Field, Benoni
Umpires: Rocky D'Mello (Ken) and Munir Khan (Ken)
Player of the match: N/A

- Seychelles won the toss and elected to bat

1 October
Scorecard

Tanzania; 205/5 (20 overs)	v	Sierra Leone; 110/9 (20 overs)
Seif Khalifa 60 (41); Abass Gbla 3/30 (4 overs)		Brima Ansumana 22* (22); Riziki Kiseto 3/17 (3 overs)

Tanzania won by 95 runs
Willowmoore Park B Field, Benoni
Umpires: Jannie Bedford (RSA) and Claude Thorburn (Nam)
Player of the match: N/A

- Sierra Leone won the toss and elected to field

2 October
Scorecard

Mozambique; 102/8 (20 overs)	v	Botswana; 103/3 (13.4 overs)
Rueben Bragge 43 (48); Hasantha Mudiyanselage 2/12 (4 overs)		Karabo Modise 45* (29); Syed Shah 2/25 (4 overs)

Botswana won by 7 wickets
Willowmoore Park B Field, Benoni
Umpires: Wayne Dollar (RSA) and Emmanuel Byiringiro (Rwa)
Player of the match: N/A

- Mozambique won the toss and elected to bat

2 October
Scorecard

Ghana; 198/6 (20 overs)	v	Swaziland; 133 (18.3 overs)
Obed Harvey 101 (59); Eastian Sauerman 2/28 (4 overs)		Naeem Gull 35 (18); Godfred Bakiweyem 2/18 (3 overs)

Ghana won by 65 runs
Willowmoore Park B Field, Benoni
Umpires: Patric Makumbi (Uga) and Bhongolwethu Makaleni (RSA)

- Swaziland won the toss and elected to field

2 October
Scorecard

Seychelles; 85 (17.1 overs)	v	Tanzania; 86/5 (16 overs)
Harikrishnan Kamalan 24 (20); Zamoyoni Jabeneke 3/14 (4 overs)		Issa Kikasi 31 (38); Tharmenthiran Shanmugam 2/22 (4 overs)

Tanzania won by 5 wickets
Willowmoore Park B Field, Benoni
Umpires: Rocky D'Mello (Ken) and Wayne Dollar (RSA)

- Tanzania won the toss and elected to field

2 October
Scorecard

Zambia; 166/7 (20 overs)	v	Sierra Leone; 113/6 (20 overs)
Samir Bagus 40 (27); Abass Gbla 2/29 (4 overs)		Jacob Mansaray 23 (32); Feroz Munshi 2/13 (4 overs)

Zambia won by 53 runs
Willowmoore Park B Field, Benoni
Umpires: Munir Khan (Ken) and Claude Thorburn (Nam)

- Sierra Leone won the toss and elected to field.

2 October
Scorecard

Tanzania; 134/6 (20 overs)	v	Botswana; 120/8 (20 overs)
Abhik Patwa 84 (49); Karabo Modise 2/20 (4 overs)		Waseem Tajbhay 23 (22); Riziki Kiseto 2/21 (3 overs)

Tanzania won by 14 runs
Willowmoore Park B Field, Benoni
Umpires: Rocky D'Mello (Ken) and Bhongolwethu Makaleni (RSA)

- Tanzania won the toss and elected to bat

2 October
Scorecard

Ghana; 82 (18.2 overs)	v	Zambia; 83/5 (17.2 overs)
Obed Harvey 19 (25); Godfrey Kandela 2/8 (4 overs)		Himal Patel 15* (20); Kofi Bagabena 1/7 (3.2 overs)

Zambia won by 5 wickets
Willowmoore Park B Field, Benoni
Umpires: Emmanuel Byiringiro (Rwa) and Claude Thorborn (Nam)

- Ghana won the toss and elected to bat

2 October
Scorecard

Mozambique; 60 (16.3 overs)	v	Seychelles; 61/3 (14 overs)
Hemen Kotecha 15 (23); Mukesh Vadodariya 5/16 (4 overs)		Harikrishnan Kamalan 23* (34); Mohammad Shahzad 1/10 (4 overs)

Seychelles won by 7 wickets
Willowmoore Park B Field, Benoni
Umpires: Jannie Bedford (RSA) and Patric Makumbi (Uga)

- Mozambique won the toss and elected to bat

2 October
Scorecard

Sierra Leone; 169/4 (20 overs)	v	Swaziland; 117/8 (20 overs)
Ibrahim Kamara 53* (49); Saif Ullah 2/29 (3 overs)		Idris Patel 51 (38); Solomon Williams 3/19 (4 overs)

Sierra Leone won by 52 runs
Willowmoore Park B Field, Benoni
Umpires: Wayne Dollar (RSA) and Munir Khan (Ken)

- Swaziland won the toss and elected to field

3 October
Scorecard

Sierra Leone; 77/8 (20 overs)	v	Botswana; 78/3 (10.2 overs)
Lansana Lamin 23* (37); Nabil Master 2/12 (4 overs)		Faisal Rana 25 (20); Ibrahim Kamara 2/22 (4 overs)

Botswana won by 7 wickets
Willowmoore Park B Field, Benoni
Umpires: Rocky D'Mello (Ken) and Claude Thorborn (Nam)

- Sierra Leone won the toss and elected to bat

3 October
Scorecard

Ghana; 114/9 (20 overs)	v	Seychelles; 115/9 (20 overs)
Lawrence Ateak 36 (33); Arvind Nanji 3/30 (4 overs)		Sanjay Kunder 44 (45); Vincent Ateak 3/7 (4 overs)

Seychelles won by 1 wicket
Willowmoore Park B Field, Benoni
Umpires: Jannie Bedford (RSA) and Bhongolwethu Makaleni (RSA)

- Seychelles won the toss and elected to field

3 October
Scorecard

Mozambique; 118/9 (20 overs)	v	Zambia; 123/4 (17.3 overs)
Syed Shah 41 (45); Himal Patel 2/22 (3 overs)		Ahmed Galiya 46* (41); Christiaan Louw 2/8 (2 overs)

Zambia won by 6 wickets
Willowmoore Park B Field, Benoni
Umpires: Emmanuel Byiringiro (Rwa) and Wayne Dollar (RSA)

- Zambia won the toss and elected to field

3 October
Scorecard

Swaziland; 80 (18.3 overs)	v	Tanzania; 81/3 (9.2 overs)
Idris Patel 28 (40); Riziki Kiseto 3/11 (2.3 overs)		Benson Mwita 32* (17); Saif Ullah 2/26 (3 overs)

Tanzania won by 7 wickets
Willowmoore Park B Field, Benoni
Umpires: Munir Khan (Ken) & Patric Makumbi (Uga)

- Swaziland won the toss and elected to bat

3 October
Scorecard

Ghana; 95/7 (20 overs)	v	Botswana; 97/3 (16.3 overs)
Samson Awiah 28 (33); Hasantha Mudiyanselage 3/29 (6 overs)		Akrum Chand 37* (46); Vincent Ateak 1/9 (2 overs)

Botswana won by 7 wickets
Willowmoore Park B Field, Benoni
Umpires: Munir Khan (Ken) & Claude Thorburn (Nam)

- Ghana won the toss and elected to bat

3 October
Scorecard

Swaziland; 107 (17.4 overs)	v	Mozambique; 108/5 (19.1 overs)
Haris Rashid 44 (41); Syed Shah 3/12 (3.4 overs)		Rueben Bragge 29* (34); Jason Wade 1/7 (1 over)

Mozambique won by 5 wickets
Willowmoore Park B Field, Benoni
Umpires: Emmanuel Byiringiro (Rwa) & Patric Makumbi (Uga)

- Mozambique won the toss and elected to field

3 October
Scorecard

Sierra Leone; 90/9 (20 overs)	v	Seychelles; 91/0 (15.1 overs)
Ibrahim Mansaray 28 (39); Mukesh Vadodariya 3/8 (4 overs)		Harikrishnan Kamalan 43* (44)

Seychelles won by 10 wickets
Willowmoore Park B Field, Benoni
Umpires: Rocky D'Mello (Ken) and Bhongolwethu Makaleni (RSA)

- Sierra Leone won the toss and elected to bat

3 October
Scorecard

Zambia; 139/6 (20 overs)	v	Tanzania; 98/9 (20 overs)
Abid Patel 67* (54); Khalil Rehemtulla 3/18 (4 overs)		Shukri Abdul Rahim 26 (29); Godfrey Kandela 3/8 (4 overs)

Zambia won by 41 runs
Willowmoore Park B Field, Benoni
Umpires: Jannie Bedford (RSA) & Wayne Dollar (RSA)

- Zambia won the toss and elected to bat

4 October
Scorecard

Botswana; 163/7 (20 overs)	v	Seychelles; 96 (19.5 overs)
Karabo Modise 57 (39); Arvind Nanji 2/21 (5 overs)		Harikrishnan Kamalan 27 (11); Segolame Ramatu 2/9 (2 overs)

Botswana won by 67 runs
Willowmoore Park B Field, Benoni
Umpires: Jannie Bedford (RSA) & Wayne Dollar (RSA)

- Seychelles won the toss and elected to field
- Botswana won the 2012 ICC World Cricket League Africa Region Division 2 T20 tournament as a result of this match.

4 October
Scorecard

Ghana; 155/6 (20 overs)	v	Sierra Leone; 96/9 (20 overs)
Samson Awiah 43* (50); Edward Marrah 2/35 (4 overs)		Mohamed Kamara 21 (18); Godfred Bakiweyem 2/15 (4 overs)

Ghana won by 59 runs
Willowmoore Park B Field, Benoni
Umpires: Emmanuel Byiringiro (Rwa) and Patric Makumbi (Uga)

- Sierra Leone won the toss and elected to field

4 October
Cricinfo

Tanzania; 182/7 (20 overs)	v	Mozambique; 141/9 (20 overs)
Abhik Patwa 55 (37); Mohammad Shahzad 2/38 (4 overs)		Mathew Singh 33 (18); Khalil Rehemtulla 2/19 (3 overs)

Tanzania won by 41 runs
Willowmoore Park B Field, Benoni
Umpires: Rocky D'Mello (Ken) and Bhongolwethu Makaleni (RSA)

- Tanzania won the toss and elected to bat

4 October
Scorecard

Zambia; 165/7 (20 overs)	v	Swaziland; 160/7 (20 overs)
Samir Bagus 30 (16); Aziz Patel 3/17 (4 overs)		Idris Patel 37 (34); Feroz Munshi 3/31 (4 overs)

Zambia won by 5 runs
Willowmoore Park B Field, Benoni
Umpires: Munir Khan (Ken) & Claude Thorburn (Nam)

- Swaziland won the toss and elected to field

== Statistics ==
=== Most runs ===
The top five run scorers (total runs) are included in this table.

Player	Team	Runs	Inns	Avg	S/R	HS	100s	50s
Abhik Patwa	Tanzania	271	6	54.20	153.97	84	0	3
Karabo Modise	Botswana	249	7	41.50	133.87	71	0	2
Obed Harvey	Ghana	227	7	32.42	124.04	101	1	1
Abid Patel	Zambia	166	7	33.20	112.92	67*	0	1
Harikrishnan Kamalan	Seychelles	163	7	32.60	114.78	46	0	0

=== Most wickets ===
The top five wicket takers (total wickets) are listed in this table.

Player	Team	Wkts	Mts	Ave	S/R	Econ	BBI
Benson Mwita	Tanzania	13	7	9.38	11.5	4.88	5/13
Kaushalkumar Patel	Seychelles	12	7	15.00	13.7	6.54	3/32
Godfrey Kandela	Zambia	11	7	11.81	14.1	5.00	4/12
Riziki Kiseto	Tanzania	10	7	8.40	9.4	5.36	3/11
Mukesh Vadodariya	Seychelles	10	7	10.60	12.6	5.04	5/16

== See also ==
- 2014 ICC World Twenty20 Qualifier
- World Cricket League
