= Naman Patel =

Kenyan cricketer

Personal information
- Full name: Naman Patel

International information
- National side: Kenya
- Source: Cricinfo, 3 December 2019

Naman Patel is a Kenyan cricketer. In November 2019, he was named in Kenya's squad for the Cricket World Cup Challenge League B tournament in Oman. He made his List A debut, for Kenya against Italy, on 3 December 2019.
