= Pierre Smith =

Bermudian cricketer (born 1990)

Personal information
- Born: 1 September 1990 (age 36)

International information
- National side: Bermuda
- Source: Cricinfo, 25 November 2019

Pierre Smith (born 1 September 1990) is a Bermudian cricketer. He was part of Bermuda's squad for the 2008 Under-19 Cricket World Cup. In November 2019, he was named in Bermuda's squad for the Cricket World Cup Challenge League B tournament in Oman. He made his List A debut, against Jersey, on 11 December 2019.
