= 2017 ICC World Cricket League Asia Region Division One =

- Dates: 22 April – 1 May 2017
- Administrator(s): International Cricket Council
- Cricket format: Limited-overs (50 overs)
- Tournament format(s): Round-robin and Knockout
- Host(s): Thailand
- Participants: 7

The 2017 ICC World Cricket League Asia Region Division One was an international cricket tournament that took place in Chiang Mai, Thailand. The teams competing in the tournament were hosts Thailand, Bhutan, Bahrain, China, Kuwait, Qatar and Saudi Arabia. The winner of the qualifier progressed to ICC WCL Division 5 which was staged in September 2017.

== Teams ==
Seven teams invited by ICC for the tournament:

- Saudi Arabia
- Qatar
- Kuwait
- Thailand
- Bahrain
- Bhutan
- China

== Points table ==
Team	P	W	L	T	NR	Points	NRR	Status
Qatar	6	5	1	0	0	10	+2.665	Qualify for 2017 ICC World Cricket League Division Five
Saudi Arabia	6	5	1	0	0	10	+2.472	Did not Qualify for 2017 ICC World Cricket League Division Five
Bahrain	6	4	2	0	0	8	+0.652	Did not Qualify for 2017 ICC World Cricket League Division Five
Kuwait	6	3	3	0	0	6	+0.676	Did not Qualify for 2017 ICC World Cricket League Division Five
Thailand	6	3	3	0	0	6	+0.496	Did not Qualify for 2017 ICC World Cricket League Division Five
Bhutan	6	1	5	0	0	2	-1.943	Did not Qualify for 2017 ICC World Cricket League Division Five
China	6	0	6	0	0	0	–6.801	Did not Qualify for 2017 ICC World Cricket League Division Five

Source: Cricinfo
