= 2017 ICC World Cricket League Division Five =

International cricket tournament

- Dates: 3 – 9 September 2017
- Administrator: International Cricket Council
- Cricket format: Limited-overs (50 overs)
- Tournament format(s): Round-robin and Knockout
- Host: South Africa
- Champions: Jersey
- Participants: 8
- Matches: 20
- Most runs: (Italy) Damian Crowley (308)
- Most wickets: (Jersey) Ben Stevens (14) (Guernsey) David Hooper (14)

The 2017 ICC World Cricket League Division Five was an international cricket tournament that took place in Benoni, South Africa during September 2017. It formed part of the 2017–19 cycle of the World Cricket League (WCL) which determines the qualification for the 2023 Cricket World Cup. Jersey and the Netherlands were interested in hosting the tournament, but the International Cricket Council (ICC) awarded it to South Africa, due to the ease of securing visas for the teams involved.

The teams were placed into two groups of four sides. Guernsey, Cayman Islands, Italy and Qatar are in Group A, and Germany, Ghana, Jersey and Vanuatu are in Group B. The top two teams in each group progressed to the semi-finals, while the other two teams competed for placings. The top two teams qualified for the World Cricket League Division Four tournament, scheduled to take place in the middle of 2018, and five teams were relegated to regional divisions.

Both Jersey and Vanuatu won their semi-final matches, therefore progressing to the tournament final, with both teams being promoted to Division Four. In the final, Jersey beat Vanuatu by 120 runs to win the tournament. Qatar won the third-place playoff by 3 wickets to remain in Division Five, with all the other teams being relegated. (Note: These were the original placements following the conclusion of the group. However, in October 2018, the ICC replaced WCL Divisions Three, Four and Five with the Cricket World Cup Challenge League, with Qatar and Italy being assigned to that competition.)

== Teams ==
Eight teams qualified for the tournament. Three teams qualified from previous WCL tournaments:

- Jersey (5th in 2016 ICC World Cricket League Division Four)
- Italy (6th in 2016 ICC World Cricket League Division Four)
- Guernsey (3rd in 2016 ICC World Cricket League Division Five)

The remaining five teams qualified through regional competitions:

- Vanuatu (East Asia Pacific)
- Cayman Islands (Americas)
- Ghana (Africa)
- Qatar (Asia)
- Germany (Europe)

== Squads ==
Cayman Islands Coach: Pearson Best	Germany Coach: Steven Knox	Ghana Coach: R. P. Sharma	Guernsey Coach: Ashley Wright
Ramon Sealy (c); Kevin Bazil; Ryan Bovell; Corey Cato; Darren Cato; Sacha De Alwis; Jalon Linton; Deno McInnis; Alessandro Morris; Ricardo Roach; Gregory Smith; Troy Taylor; Omar Willis; Conroy Wright	Rishi Pillai (c); Amith Sarma; Ahmed Wardak; Janpreet Singh; Daniel Weston; Brandon Ess; Sajid Liaqat; Asad Mohammad; Shahil Momin; Mudassar Muhammad; Ehsan Latif; Harmanjot Singh; Rana Singh; Vekatraman Ganesan	Peter Ananya (c); James Vifah; Isaac Aboagye; Godfred Bakiweyem; Julius Mensah; Frank Baaleri; David Ankrah; Kofi Bagabena; Simon Ateak; Vincent Ateak; Samson Awiah; Obed Harvey; Moses Anafie; Michael Aboagye	Jamie Nussbaumer (c); Matthew Breban; Josh Butler; Max Ellis; Will Fazakerley; Ben Ferbrache; Ben Fitchet; David Hooper; Declan Martel; Jason Martin; Oliver Newey; Tom Nightingale; Luke Nussbaumer; Matthew Stokes
Italy Coach: Joe Scuderi	Jersey Coach: Neil MacRae	Qatar Coach: Mohtashim Rasheed	Vanuatu Coach: Shane Deitz
Gayashan Munasinghe (c); Alessandro Bonora; Damian Crowley; Madupa Fernando; Rakibul Hasan; Fida Hussain; Crishan Kalugamage; Supun Tharanga; Gian-Piero Meade; Joy Perera; Peter Petricola; Carl Sandri; Charanjeet Singh; Manpreet Singh	Charles Perchard (c); Corey Bisson; Corne Bodenstein; Harrison Carlyon; Jake Dunford; Luke Gallichan; Peter Gough; Anthony Hawkins-Kay; Jonty Jenner; Ben Kynman; Robert McBey; Elliot Miles; Ben Stevens; Nathaniel Watkins	Inam-ul-Haq (c); Mohammed Rizlan; Awais Malik; Faisal Javed; Iqbal Hussain; Dharmang Patel; Qalandar Khan; Mohammed Nadeem; Kamran Khan; Tamoor Sajjad; Zaheer Ibrahim; Muhammad Tanveer; Imran Ashraf; Khurram Shahzad	Andrew Mansale (c); Callum Blake; Jelany Chilia; Jonathon Dunn; Worford Kalworai; Trevor Langa; Patrick Matautaava; Williamsing Nalisa; Nalin Nipiko; Joshua Rasu; Kalo Shem; Ronald Tari; Jamal Vira; Wesley Viraliliu

== Fixtures ==
=== Group A ===
Pos	Team	Pld	W	L	T	NR	Pts	NRR
1	Italy	3	3	0	0	0	6	1.466
2	Qatar	3	2	1	0	0	4	0.431
3	Guernsey	3	1	2	0	0	2	0.048
4	Cayman Islands	3	0	3	0	0	0	−2.030

3 September 2017
Scorecard

Qatar; 343/7 (50 overs)	v	Cayman Islands; 250/8 (50 overs)

Qatar won by 93 runs
Willowmoore Park, Benoni

- Cayman Islands won the toss and elected to field.

3 September 2017
Scorecard

Italy; 277/7 (50 overs)	v	Guernsey; 229/8 (50 overs)

Italy won by 48 runs
Willowmoore A, Benoni

- Italy won the toss and elected to bat.

4 September 2017
Scorecard

Cayman Islands; 214/9 (50 overs)	v	Guernsey; 216/4 (36.3 overs)

Guernsey won by 6 wickets
Willowmoore B, Benoni

- Cayman Islands won the toss and elected to bat.

4 September 2017
Scorecard

Qatar; 209 (46.3 overs)	v	Italy; 212/4 (41.5 overs)

Italy won by 6 wickets
Willowmoore C, Benoni

- Italy won the toss and elected to field.

6 September 2017
Scorecard

Guernsey; 231/9 (50 overs)	v	Qatar; 234/7 (47.5 overs)

Qatar won by 3 wickets
Willowmoore Park, Benoni

- Qatar won the toss and elected to field.

6 September 2017
Scorecard

Italy; 326/6 (50 overs)	v	Cayman Islands; 204 (42.4 overs)

Italy won by 122 runs
Willowmoore A, Benoni

- Italy won the toss and elected to bat.

=== Group B ===
Pos	Team	Pld	W	L	T	NR	Pts	NRR
1	Jersey	3	3	0	0	0	6	1.473
2	Vanuatu	3	1	2	0	0	2	−0.384
3	Germany	3	1	2	0	0	2	−0.612
4	Ghana	3	1	2	0	0	2	−0.670

3 September 2017
Scorecard

Vanuatu; 170 (48 overs)	v	Jersey; 174/4 (34.2 overs)

Jersey won by 6 wickets
Willowmoore B, Benoni

- Jersey won the toss and elected to field.

3 September 2017
Scorecard

Ghana; 158 (42 overs)	v	Germany; 159/9 (39.5 overs)

Germany won by 1 wicket
Willowmoore C, Benoni

- Germany won the toss and elected to field.

4 September 2017
Scorecard

Germany; 248 (49.2 overs)	v	Jersey; 251/5 (44.4 overs)

Jersey won by 5 wickets
Willowmoore Park, Benoni

- Jersey won the toss and elected to field.

4 September 2017
Scorecard

Vanuatu; 124 (47.2 overs)	v	Ghana; 125/8 (33.5 overs)

Ghana won by 2 wickets
Willowmoore A, Benoni

- Vanuatu won the toss and elected to bat.

6 September 2017
Scorecard

Jersey; 226/8 (50 overs)	v	Ghana; 118 (36.4 overs)

Jersey won by 108 runs
Willowmoore B, Benoni

- Ghana won the toss and elected to field.

6 September 2017
Scorecard

Germany; 227 (49.3 overs)	v	Vanuatu; 228/6 (28.2 overs)

Vanuatu won by 4 wickets
Willowmoore C, Benoni

- Vanuatu won the toss and elected to field.

== Semi-finals ==
7 September 2017
Scorecard

Guernsey; 213 (47.3 overs)	v	Ghana; 190 (47.3 overs)

Guernsey won by 23 runs
Willowmoore Park, Benoni

- Ghana won the toss and elected to field.

7 September 2017
Scorecard

Cayman Islands; 268/6 (50 overs)	v	Germany; 271/5 (41.5 overs)

Germany won by 5 wickets
Willowmoore A, Benoni

- Cayman Islands won the toss and elected to bat.

7 September 2017
Scorecard

Italy; 183 (46.4 overs)	v	Vanuatu; 186/4 (34.5 overs)

Vanuatu won by 6 wickets
Willowmoore B, Benoni

- Vanuatu won the toss and elected to field.

7 September 2017
Scorecard

Qatar; 152 (46.3 overs)	v	Jersey; 155/3 (27.5 overs)

Jersey won by 7 wickets
Willowmoore C, Benoni

- Jersey won the toss and elected to field.

== Playoffs ==
=== Seventh-place playoff ===
9 September 2017
Scorecard

Cayman Islands; 136 (42.5 overs)	v	Ghana; 140/4 (19.3 overs)

Ghana won by 6 wickets
Willowmoore C, Benoni

- Cayman Islands won the toss and elected to bat.

=== Fifth-place playoff ===
9 September 2017
Scorecard

Guernsey; 269/7 (50 overs)	v	Germany; 273/6 (45.2 overs)

Germany won by 4 wickets
Willowmoore B, Benoni

- Guernsey won the toss and elected to bat.

=== Third-place playoff ===
9 September 2017
Scorecard

Italy; 225/7 (50 overs)	v	Qatar; 229/7 (47.5 overs)

Qatar won by 3 wickets
Willowmoore A, Benoni

- Italy won the toss and elected to bat.

=== Final ===
9 September 2017
Scorecard

Jersey; 255 (48 overs)	v	Vanuatu; 135 (36.5 overs)

Jersey won by 120 runs
Willowmoore Park, Benoni

- Vanuatu won the toss and elected to field.

== Final standings ==
Pos.	Team	Status
1st	Jersey	Promoted to Division Four for 2018
2nd	Vanuatu	Promoted to Division Four for 2018
3rd	Qatar	Remained in Division Five
4th	Italy	Relegated to regional competitions
5th	Germany	Relegated to regional competitions
6th	Guernsey	Relegated to regional competitions
7th	Ghana	Relegated to regional competitions
8th	Cayman Islands	Relegated to regional competitions
