= Brandon Ess =

German cricketer (born 1971)

Personal information
- Born: 11 July 1971 (age 55)
- Role: Batsman

International information
- National side: Germany
- Source: Cricinfo, 3 September 2017

Brandon Ess (born 11 July 1971) is a German cricketer. He was named in Germany's squad for the 2017 ICC World Cricket League Division Five tournament in South Africa. He played in Germany's opening fixture, against Ghana, on 3 September 2017.
