= Deunte Darrell =

Bermudian cricketer (born 1992)

Personal information
- Full name: Deunte Darrell
- Born: 20 September 1992 (age 34)

International information
- National side: Bermuda (2019)
- T20I debut (cap 17): 18 August 2019 v United States
- Last T20I: 26 October 2019 v Netherlands
- Source: Cricinfo, 26 October 2019

Deunte Darrell (born 20 September 1992) is a Bermudian cricketer. In August 2019, he was named in Bermuda's squad for the Regional Finals of the 2018–19 ICC T20 World Cup Americas Qualifier tournament. He made his Twenty20 International (T20I) debut against the United States on 18 August 2019. In September 2019, he was named in Bermuda's squad for the 2019 ICC T20 World Cup Qualifier tournament in the United Arab Emirates. In November 2019, he was named in Bermuda's squad for the Cricket World Cup Challenge League B tournament in Oman. He made his List A debut, for Bermuda against Hong Kong, on 3 December 2019.

Darrell has a history of disciplinary issues. In December 2010 he was banned from international cricket for six months by the Bermuda Cricket Board after breaching the board's code of conduct while on tour with the Bermuda national under-19 cricket team. In October 2019, he received a one-match ban from the International Cricket Council (ICC) after a game against Namibia at the ICC T20 World Cup Qualifier in which he threw his playing equipment away after a leg before wicket dismissal. Two months later, he was banned for two matches after using profanity following a run out in a World Cup Challenge League game against Kenya.
