= Corey Cato =

South African cricketer

Personal information
- Full name: Corey Cato

International information
- National side: Cayman Islands
- Source: Cricinfo, 7 August 2019

Corey Cato is a Caymanian cricketer. He played in three matches for the Cayman Islands cricket team in the 2017 ICC World Cricket League Division Five tournament in South Africa.

In August 2019, he was named in the Cayman Islands cricket team's Twenty20 International (T20I) squad for the Regional Finals of the 2018–19 ICC T20 World Cup Americas Qualifier tournament.
