= Shahzad Ukani =

Ugandan cricketer (born 1985)

Personal information
- Full name: Ukani Shahzad Kamaluddin
- Born: 30 December 1985 (age 40)
- Source: Cricinfo, 29 May 2017

Shahzad Ukani (born 30 December 1985) is a Ugandan cricketer. He played for Uganda in the 2017 ICC World Cricket League Division Three tournament in May 2017. In November 2019, he was named in Uganda's squad for the Cricket World Cup Challenge League B tournament in Oman. He made his List A debut, for Uganda against Jersey, on 2 December 2019.

== See also ==
- William Kamanyi
- Kenneth Kamyuka
- Salaudin Khan
- Laurence Sematimba
