= 2017 ICC World Cricket League Division Three =

International cricket tournament

- Dates: 23 – 30 May 2017
- Administrator: International Cricket Council
- Cricket format: 50-over
- Tournament format(s): Round-robin and playoffs
- Host: Uganda
- Champions: Oman
- Participants: 6
- Matches: 18
- Most runs: (Canada) Bhavindu Adhihetty (222)
- Most wickets: (Oman) Khawar Ali (14)

2017 ICC World Cricket League Division Three was a cricket tournament that took place in Uganda between 23 and 30 May 2017. The matches took place in Lugogo, Kyambogo and Entebbe. The top two teams, Oman and Canada, were promoted to Division Two. The final ended as a no result due to rain, and therefore Oman won the tournament by virtue of finishing top of the group stage table.

Three countries bid to host the tournament – Canada, Malaysia, and Uganda. In October 2016, the International Cricket Council (ICC) approved a proposal for the tournament to be held in Uganda, subject to security arrangements and costs. Two ICC officials toured the country in December 2016, meeting with the country's First Lady, Janet Museveni, and Prime Minister, Ruhakana Rugunda. Museveni pledged government support for the tournament.

== Teams ==
The following teams qualified:

- Uganda (5th in 2015 ICC World Cricket League Division Two)
- Canada (6th in 2015 ICC World Cricket League Division Two)
- Malaysia (3rd in 2014 ICC World Cricket League Division Three)
- Singapore (4th in 2014 ICC World Cricket League Division Three)
- United States (1st in 2016 ICC World Cricket League Division Four)
- Oman (2nd in 2016 ICC World Cricket League Division Four)

== Venues ==
The following three venues were used for the tournament:

- Lugogo Cricket Oval, Lugogo Stadium, Kampala
- Kyambogo Cricket Oval, Kyambogo University, Kampala
- Entebbe Cricket Oval, Entebbe

== Preparation ==
The United States held a selection camp in Houston, Texas in March with 50 players, including three players with first-class experience; Ibrahim Khaleel, Roy Silva and Camilus Alexander. The United States also participated in a six-day pre-tour in South Africa, immediately prior to the start of the tournament. Prior to the tournament, Malaysia played in the 2017 ACC Emerging Teams Asia Cup, Canada played warm-up matches in Barbados and Uganda invited Kenya to play five 50-over matches. Canada also played three warm-up matches in Zimbabwe.

== Squads ==
The following players were selected for the tournament:

Canada Coach: Henry Osinde	Malaysia Coach: Bilal Asad	Oman Coach: Duleep Mendis	Singapore Coach: Trevor Chappell	Uganda Coach: Steve Tikolo	United States Coach: Pubudu Dassanayake
Nitish Kumar (c); Bhavindu Adhihetty; Rizwan Cheema; Navneet Dhaliwal; Satsimranjit Dhindsa; Nikhil Dutta; Jimmy Hansra; Mark Monfort; Dhanuka Pathirana; Cecil Pervez; Junaid Siddiqui; Durand Soraine; Hamza Tariq; Saad Bin Zafar	Ahmad Faiz (c); Anwar Arudin; Syed Aziz; Derek Duraisingam; Khizar Hayat; Muhammad Wafiq; Fikri Makram; Shukri Rahim; Anwar Rahman; Aminuddin Ramly; Che Wan Zalati; Shafiq Sharif (wk); Pavandeep Singh; Virandeep Singh	Sultan Ahmed (c); Khawar Ali; Munis Ansari; Twinkal Bhandari; Aqib Ilyas; Bilal Khan; Ajay Lalcheta; Zeeshan Maqsood; Sufyan Mehmood; Mohammad Nadeem; Muhammed Naseem; Arun Poulose; Noorul Riaz; Jatinder Singh	Chetan Suryawanshi (c); Suresh Appusamy; Surendran Chandramohan; Parag Dahiwal; Mulewa Dharmichand; Anantha Krishna; Amjad Mahboob; Arjun Mutreja; Anish Paraam; Navin Param; Janak Prakash; Rohan Rangarajan; Chaminda Ruwan; Selladore Vijayakumar	Davis Arinaitwe (c); Brian Masaba (vc); Hamu Kayondo; Arthur Kyobe; Deusdedit Muhumuza; Roger Mukasa; Frank Nsubuga; Arnold Otwani; Irfan Sahibzaba; Laurence Sematimba; Jonathan Ssebanja; Henry Ssenyondo; Shahzad Ukani; Charles Waiswa	Steven Taylor (c); Timroy Allen; Camilus Alexander; Alex Amsterdam; ~~Fahad Babar~~; Akeem Dodson; Elmore Hutchinson; Noshtush Kenjige; Ibrahim Khaleel (wk); Ali Khan; Mrunal Patel; Sagar Patel; Timil Patel; Jasdeep Singh; Nicholas Standford

Fahad Babar was originally named in the United States squad, but was replaced by Sagar Patel, after failing to recover from a hand injury suffered during the team's Los Angeles training camp.

== Points table ==
Pos	Team	Pld	W	L	T	NR	Pts	NRR	Promotion or relegation
1	Oman	5	4	1	0	0	8	1.238	Meet in the final and promoted to Division Two for 2018
2	Canada	5	3	2	0	0	6	0.817	Meet in the final and promoted to Division Two for 2018
3	Singapore	5	3	2	0	0	6	−0.410	Meet in the 3rd playoff and remain in Division Three
4	United States	5	2	3	0	0	4	−0.127	Meet in the 3rd playoff and remain in Division Three
5	Uganda	5	2	3	0	0	4	−0.205	Meet in the 5th playoff and relegated to Division Four for 2018
6	Malaysia	5	1	4	0	0	2	−1.286	Meet in the 5th playoff and relegated to Division Four for 2018

== Round-robin ==
23 May 2017
Scorecard

Canada; 234/8 (42 overs)	v	Uganda; 168 (38.2 overs)

Canada won by 66 runs (DLS method)
Lugogo Cricket Oval, Lugogo Stadium

- Canada won the toss and elected to bat.

23 May 2017
Scorecard

Malaysia; 121 (35.3 overs)	v	Singapore; 123/3 (31.2 overs)

Singapore won by 7 wickets (DLS method)
Kyambogo Cricket Oval, Kyambogo University

- Singapore won the toss and elected to field.

23 May 2017
Scorecard

United States; 180/7 (43 overs)	v	Oman; 184/6 (39.4 overs)

Oman won by 4 wickets (DLS method)
Entebbe Cricket Oval

- Oman won the toss and elected to field.

24 May 2017
Scorecard

Canada; 274/9 (50 overs)	v	Oman; 191 (40.5 overs)

Canada won by 83 runs
Lugogo Cricket Oval, Lugogo Stadium

- Oman won the toss and elected to field.

24 May 2017
Scorecard

Malaysia; 117 (40.4 overs)	v	United States; 118/4 (28 overs)

United States of America won by 6 wickets
Kyambogo Cricket Oval, Kyambogo University

- United States of America won the toss and elected to field.

24 May 2017
Scorecard

Uganda; 217/9 (50 overs)	v	Singapore; 151 (44 overs)

Uganda won by 66 runs
Entebbe Cricket Oval

- Singapore won the toss and elected to field.

26 May 2017
Scorecard

United States; 237 (47 overs)	v	Singapore; 238/3 (45.4 overs)

Singapore won by 7 wickets
Lugogo Cricket Oval, Lugogo Stadium

- United States of America won the toss and elected to bat.

26 May 2017
Scorecard

Uganda; 144 (46.3 overs)	v	Oman; 145/4 (27 overs)

Oman won by 6 wickets
Kyambogo Cricket Oval, Kyambogo University

- Uganda won the toss and elected to bat.

26 May 2017
Scorecard

Canada; 141 (48.5 overs)	v	Malaysia; 143/4 (38 overs)

Malaysia won by 6 wickets
Entebbe Cricket Oval

- Malaysia won the toss and elected to field.

27 May 2017
Scorecard

Malaysia; 189 (50 overs)	v	Uganda; 193/6 (36.2 overs)

Uganda won by 4 wickets
Lugogo Cricket Oval, Lugogo Stadium

- Uganda won the toss and elected to field.

27 May 2017
Scorecard

Canada; 256/8 (50 overs)	v	United States; 160 (43 overs)

Canada won by 96 runs
Kyambogo Cricket Oval, Kyambogo University

- United States of America won the toss and elected to field.

27 May 2017
Scorecard

Singapore; 100 (37.1 overs)	v	Oman; 101/5 (24.1 overs)

Oman won by 5 wickets
Entebbe Cricket Oval

- Oman won the toss and elected to field.

29 May 2017
Scorecard

Oman; 293/7 (50 overs)	v	Malaysia; 162 (33.1 overs)

Oman won by 131 runs
Lugogo Cricket Oval, Lugogo Stadium

- Malaysia won the toss and elected to field.

29 May 2017
Scorecard

Singapore; 166 (36.4 overs)	v	Canada; 164 (38 overs)

Singapore won by 2 runs
Kyambogo Cricket Oval, Kyambogo University

- Canada won the toss and elected to field.

29 May 2017
Scorecard

United States; 145 (49.5 overs)	v	Uganda; 132 (43 overs)

United States of America won by 13 runs
Entebbe Cricket Oval

- Uganda won the toss and elected to field.

== Playoffs ==
=== Fifth-place playoff ===
30 May 2017
Scorecard

Uganda	v	Malaysia

Match abandoned
Lugogo Cricket Oval, Lugogo Stadium

- No toss.

=== Third-place playoff ===
30 May 2017
Scorecard

United States; 95/2 (25.2 overs)	v	Singapore

No result
Kyambogo Cricket Oval, Kyambogo University

- Singapore won the toss and elected to field.

=== Final ===
30 May 2017
Scorecard

Canada; 176/3 (38 overs)	v	Oman; 50/2 (4.3 overs)

No result
Entebbe Cricket Oval

- Oman won the toss and elected to field.

== Final standings ==
Pos	Team	Status
1st	Oman	Promoted to Division Two for 2018
2nd	Canada	Promoted to Division Two for 2018
3rd	Singapore	Remained in Division Three
4th	United States	Remained in Division Three
5th	Uganda	Relegated to Division Four for 2018
6th	Malaysia	Relegated to Division Four for 2018
