= 2017 ICC World Cricket League Americas Region Qualifiers =

- Administrator: International Cricket Council
- Cricket format: Limited-overs (50 overs)
- Tournament format(s): Round-robin and Knockout
- Host: Argentina
- Participants: 2
- Matches: 3

The 2017 ICC World Cricket League Americas Region Qualifiers is an international cricket tournament that is scheduled to take place in Belgrano, Argentina. The winner of the qualifiers will progress to ICC WCL Division 5 which will be staged in September 2017.

== Teams ==
Two teams invited by ICC for the tournament:

- Argentina
- Cayman Islands

== Fixtures ==
=== Round robin ===
22 March
10:30

| Argentina; 117/9 (33 overs) | v | Cayman Islands; 118/7 (32.3 overs) |

Cayman Islands won by 3 wickets
Hurlingham Club, Belgrano

- Cayman Islands won the toss and elected to field.
- Rain reduced the match to 33 overs per side.

23 March
10:30

| Cayman Islands; 173/8 (33 overs) | v | Argentina; 106/10 (24.5 overs) |

Cayman Islands won by 67 runs
Belgrano Athletic Club, Belgrano

- Argentina won the toss and elected to field.
- Rain reduced the match to 33 overs per side.

25 March
10:30

| Argentina; 96/10 (36 overs) | v | Cayman Islands; 97/5 (21 overs) |

Cayman Islands won by 5 wickets
Hurlingham Club, Belgrano

- Argentina won the toss and chose to bat.

== Result ==
| Cayman Islands | 3 – 0 | Argentina |
|---|---|---|
| Qualify for 2017 ICC World Cricket League Division Five | ← → | Did not Qualify for 2017 ICC World Cricket League Division Five |

Source: ICC
