= Che Wan Zalati =

Malaysian cricketer (born 1995)

Personal information
- Born: 19 June 1995 (age 31)
- Source: Cricinfo, 23 May 2017

Che Wan Zalati (born 19 June 1995) is a Malaysian cricketer. He played for Malaysia in the 2017 ICC World Cricket League Division Three tournament in May 2017. In April 2018, he was named in Malaysia's squad for the 2018 ICC World Cricket League Division Four tournament, also in Malaysia.
