= 2019 Cricket World Cup Challenge League B (Oman) =

Cricket tournament

2019 Oman Cricket World Cup Challenge League B
- Dates: 2 – 12 December 2019
- Administrator: International Cricket Council
- Cricket format: List A
- Tournament format: Round-robin
- Host: Oman Cricket
- Participants: 6
- Matches: 15
- Most runs: (Uganda) Shahzad Ukani (275)
- Most wickets: (Italy) Gareth Berg (11)

The 2019 Oman Cricket World Cup Challenge League B was the inaugural edition of Group B of the 2019–2022 Cricket World Cup Challenge League, a cricket tournament which formed part of the qualification pathway to the 2023 Cricket World Cup. It took place in Oman, with all the matches having List A status.

Initially, it was scheduled to take place between 25 November and 10 December 2019 in Hong Kong. However, citing the instability in Hong Kong, the first round of matches in League B were moved to Oman. Uganda won the series, after they won all five of their matches.

== Squads ==
Bermuda	Hong Kong	Italy	Jersey	Kenya	Uganda
Terryn Fray (c); ~~Rodney Trott (vc)~~; Okera Bascome; Onais Bascome; Derrick Brangman; Zeko Burgess; Deunte Darrell; Coolidge Durham; Kyle Hodsoll; Kamau Leverock; Tre Manders; Justin Pitcher; Delray Rawlins; Pierre Smith; Sinclair Smith; Dion Stovell	Aizaz Khan (c); Ahsan Abbasi; Haroon Arshad; Waqas Barkat; Aarush Bhagwat; Adit Gorawara; Aftab Hussain; Raunaq Kapur; Ehsan Khan; Nizakat Khan; Hassan Khan Mohammad; Nasrulla Rana; Kinchit Shah; Shahid Wasif	Joy Perera (c); Rehman Abdul; Gareth Berg; Zahid Cheema; Madupa Fernando; Luis di Giglio; Rakibul Hasan; Fida Hussain; Nicholas Maiolo; Gian-Piero Meade; Michael Ross; Jaspreet Singh; Manpreet Singh; Nikolai Smith	Charles Perchard (c); Daniel Birrell; Corey Bisson; Dominic Blampied; Harrison Carlyon; Jake Dunford (wk); Nick Greenwood; Jonty Jenner; Elliot Miles; Rhys Palmer; William Robertson; Ben Stevens; Julius Sumerauer; Nathaniel Watkins	Irfan Karim (c); Jadhavji Bhimji; Sachin Bhudia; Emmanuel Bundi; Aman Gandhi; Dhiren Gondaria; Shem Ngoche; Collins Obuya; Nehemiah Odhiambo; Lucas Oluoch; Lameck Onyango; Naman Patel; Rakep Patel; Rushab Patel	Brian Masaba (c); Fred Achelam; Richard Agamiire; Bilal Hassan; Roger Mukasa; Dinesh Nakrani; Frank Nsubuga; Arnold Otwani; Ronak Patel; Riazat Ali Shah; Henry Ssenyondo; Shahzad Ukani; Charles Waiswa; Kenneth Waiswa

Bermuda's vice-captain Rodney Trott was unable to travel to Oman due to an administrative error, after it was discovered that his passport was due to expire within six months. He was replaced in the squad by Coolidge Durham. Initially, when Kenya announced their squad, they did not name their captain. Cricket Kenya then made some changes to the management of the team, also naming Irfan Karim as the captain, replacing Shem Ngoche.

== Fixtures ==
2 December 2019
09:30
Scorecard

Uganda; 248/8 (50 overs)	v	Jersey; 223 (49.1 overs)
Dinesh Nakrani 79* (70); Julius Sumerauer 3/51 (8 overs)		Ben Stevens 43 (58); Dinesh Nakrani 3/32 (8.1 overs)

Uganda won by 25 runs
Al Amerat Cricket Stadium, Muscat
Umpires: Rahul Asher (Oma) and Tabarak Dar (HK)
Player of the match: Dinesh Nakrani (Uga)

- Jersey won the toss and elected to field.
- Corey Bisson, Dominic Blampied, Harrison Carlyon, Jake Dunford, Nick Greenwood, Jonty Jenner, Elliot Miles, Charles Perchard, Ben Stevens, Julius Sumerauer, Nathaniel Watkins (Jer), Bilal Hassan, Dinesh Nakrani, Ronak Patel, Riazat Ali Shah and Shahzad Ukani (Uga) all made their List A debuts.

3 December 2019
09:30
Scorecard

Kenya; 210 (49.4 overs)	v	Italy; 211/6 (46.5 overs)
Irfan Karim 71 (121); Michael Ross 4/35 (9.4 overs)		Nikolai Smith 102* (122); Collins Obuya 3/38 (10 overs)

Italy won by 4 wickets
Al Amerat Cricket Stadium, Muscat
Umpires: Rahul Asher (Oma) and Vinod Babu (Oma)
Player of the match: Nikolai Smith (Ita)

- Italy won the toss and elected to field.
- Zahid Cheema, Madupa Fernando, Luis di Giglio, Nicholas Maiolo, Gian-Piero Meade, Joy Perera, Michael Ross, Manpreet Singh (Ita) and Naman Patel (Ken) all made their List A debuts.
- Nikolai Smith (Ita) scored his first century in List A cricket.

3 December 2019
09:30
Scorecard

Bermuda; 291/8 (50 overs)	v	Hong Kong; 294/7 (49.2 overs)
Kamau Leverock 63 (40); Aftab Hussain 3/39 (10 overs)		Kinchit Shah 116* (135); Onais Bascome 2/49 (10 overs)

Hong Kong won by 3 wickets
Al Amerat Cricket Stadium, Muscat
Umpires: Vinay Kumar Jha (Nep) and Shiju Sam (UAE)
Player of the match: Kinchit Shah (HK)

- Hong Kong won the toss and elected to field.
- Okera Bascome, Onais Bascome, Deunte Darrell, Tre Manders and Sinclair Smith (Ber) all made their List A debuts.
- Kinchit Shah (HK) scored his first century in List A cricket.

5 December 2019
09:30
Scorecard

Jersey; 173 (49.4 overs)	v	Hong Kong; 177/6 (42.5 overs)
Nathaniel Watkins 31 (69); Kinchit Shah 3/35 (10 overs)		Kinchit Shah 59* (75); Ben Stevens 3/28 (10 overs)

Hong Kong won by 4 wickets
Al Amerat Cricket Stadium, Muscat
Umpires: Vinay Kumar Jha (Nep) and Harikrishna Pillai (Oma)
Player of the match: Kinchit Shah (HK)

- Hong Kong won the toss and elected to field.
- Adit Gorawara (HK) made his List A debut.

5 December 2019
09:30
Scorecard

Kenya; 253/6 (50 overs)	v	Uganda; 254/7 (49.2 overs)
Naman Patel 60 (83); Frank Nsubuga 2/38 (10 overs)		Ronak Patel 86 (106); Nehemiah Odhiambo 3/53 (8.2 overs)

Uganda won by 3 wickets
Al Amerat Cricket Stadium, Muscat
Umpires: Rahul Asher (Oma) and Tabarak Dar (HK)
Player of the match: Ronak Patel (Uga)

- Kenya won the toss and elected to bat.
- Richard Agamiire and Kenneth Waiswa (Uga) both made their List A debuts.

6 December 2019
09:30
Scorecard

Bermuda; 208 (45.2 overs)	v	Uganda; 211/3 (40.1 overs)
Tre Manders 59 (99); Henry Ssenyondo 4/35 (8.2 overs)		Shahzad Ukani 86 (116); Kyle Hodsoll 1/23 (8 overs)

Uganda won by 7 wickets
Al Amerat Cricket Stadium, Muscat
Umpires: Vinod Babu (Oma) and Tabarak Dar (HK)
Player of the match: Shahzad Ukani (Uga)

- Bermuda won the toss and elected to bat.
- Zeko Burgess (Ber) and Fred Achelam (Uga) both made their List A debuts.

6 December 2019
09:30
Scorecard

Jersey; 280/8 (50 overs)	v	Italy; 158 (41 overs)
Nick Greenwood 102 (111); Gareth Berg 3/32 (10 overs)		Joy Perera 47 (59); Ben Stevens 3/24 (9 overs)

Jersey won by 122 runs
Al Amerat Cricket Stadium, Muscat
Umpires: Vinay Kumar Jha (Nep) and Shiju Sam (UAE)
Player of the match: Nick Greenwood (Jer)

- Italy won the toss and elected to field.
- Rehman Abdul (Ita) and Josh Lawrenson (Jer) both made their List A debuts.
- Nick Greenwood (Jer) scored his first century in List A cricket.

8 December 2019
09:30
Scorecard

Hong Kong; 170/7 (45.3 overs)	v	Italy
Shahid Wasif 39 (51); Michael Ross 2/25 (10 overs)

No result
Al Amerat Cricket Stadium, Muscat
Umpires: Rahul Asher (Oma) and Vinay Kumar Jha (Nep)

- Italy won the toss and elected to field.
- Rain during Hong Kong's innings prevented any further play.
- Ahmed Hassan (Ita) made his List A debut.

8 December 2019
09:30
Scorecard

Bermuda; 230/7 (46.4 overs)	v	Kenya
Tre Manders 51 (63); Lameck Onyango 3/52 (10 overs)

No result
Al Amerat Cricket Stadium, Muscat
Umpires: Vinod Babu (Oma) and Tabarak Dar (HK)

- Bermuda won the toss and elected to bat.
- Rain during Bermuda's innings prevented any further play.
- Derrick Brangman (Ber) made his List A debut.

9 December 2019
09:30
Scorecard

Jersey; 233/5 (50 overs)	v	Kenya; 239/3 (46.2 overs)
Corey Bisson 58* (44); Shem Ngoche 3/24 (10 overs)		Rakep Patel 101* (106); Julius Sumerauer 2/34 (8 overs)

Kenya won by 7 wickets
Al Amerat Cricket Stadium, Muscat
Umpires: Rahul Asher (Oma) and Harikrishna Pillai (Oma)
Player of the match: Rakep Patel (Ken)

- Jersey won the toss and elected to bat.
- Sachin Bhudia (Ken) made his List A debut.

9 December 2019
09:30
Scorecard

Uganda; 218 (48.3 overs)	v	Italy; 180 (46.4 overs)
Shahzad Ukani 78 (88); Gareth Berg 4/25 (9.3 overs)		Gian-Piero Meade 43 (94); Bilal Hassan 5/27 (8.4 overs)

Uganda won by 38 runs
Al Amerat Cricket Stadium, Muscat
Umpires: Vinod Babu (Oma) and Tabarak Dar (HK)
Player of the match: Bilal Hassan (Uga)

- Italy won the toss and elected to field.

11 December 2019
09:30
Scorecard

Hong Kong; 147 (47.5 overs)	v	Uganda; 150/4 (36.2 overs)
Waqas Barkat 27 (43); Bilal Hassan 3/33 (9 overs)		Arnold Otwani 66* (112); Aizaz Khan 2/16 (7 overs)

Uganda won by 6 wickets
Al Amerat Cricket Stadium, Muscat
Umpires: Rahul Asher (Oma) and Vinay Kumar Jha (Nep)
Player of the match: Arnold Otwani (Uga)

- Uganda won the toss and elected to field.

11 December 2019
09:30
Scorecard

Bermuda; 110 (23 overs)	v	Jersey; 113/4 (19.3 overs)
Delray Rawlins 31 (27); Elliot Miles 4/8 (5 overs)		Jake Dunford 35 (50); Derrick Brangman 1/21 (3.3 overs)

Jersey won by 6 wickets
Al Amerat Cricket Stadium, Muscat
Umpires: Tabarak Dar (HK) and Harikrishna Pillai (Oma)
Player of the match: Elliot Miles (Jer)

- Bermuda won the toss and elected to bat.
- Pierre Smith (Ber) and Daniel Birrell (Jer) both made their List A debuts.

12 December 2019
09:30
Scorecard

Bermuda; 180 (40.3 overs)	v	Italy; 181/5 (32 overs)
Kamau Leverock 40 (15); Madupa Fernando 3/21 (10 overs)		Gian-Piero Meade 49 (63); Zeko Burgess 3/29 (5 overs)

Italy won by 5 wickets
Al Amerat Cricket Stadium, Muscat
Umpires: Tabarak Dar (HK) and Vinay Kumar Jha (Nep)
Player of the match: Gian-Piero Meade (Ita)

- Italy won the toss and elected to field.
- Jaspreet Singh (Ita) made his List A debut.

12 December 2019
09:30
Scorecard

Kenya; 213 (47 overs)	v	Hong Kong; 217/7 (41.5 overs)
Collins Obuya 63 (90); Nasrulla Rana 5/46 (9 overs)		Aizaz Khan 53 (62); Shem Ngoche 2/40 (10 overs)

Hong Kong won by 3 wickets
Al Amerat Cricket Stadium, Muscat
Umpires: Rahul Asher (Oma) and Harikrishna Pillai (Oma)
Player of the match: Nasrulla Rana (HK)

- Hong Kong won the toss and elected to field.
