= Supun Tharanga =

Sri Lankan cricketer (born 1986)

Personal information
- Full name: Manampeli Mahapata Bandhi Ralalage Supun Tharanga Coory Wanigaratne
- Born: 22 March 1986 (age 40)

International information
- National side: Italy
- Source: Cricinfo, 10 September 2017

Supun Tharanga (born 22 March 1986) is a Sri Lankan cricketer. He made his first-class debut for Saracens Sports Club on 9 February 2007. In August 2017, he was named in Italy's squad for the 2017 ICC World Cricket League Division Five tournament in South Africa.
