= Michael Ross (cricketer) =

Italian cricketer (born 1998)

Personal information
- Full name: Michael James Ross
- Born: 24 April 1998 (age 28); Thlabane
- Batting: Right-handed
- Bowling: Right-arm off-break
- Role: All-rounder

International information
- National side: Italy
- T20I debut (cap 11): 25 May 2019 v Germany
- Last T20I: 20 June 2019 v Denmark
- Source: Cricinfo, 20 June 2019

Michael Ross (born 24 April 1998) is an Italian cricketer who plays for the national team. In May 2019, he was named in Italy's squad for their Twenty20 International (T20I) series against Germany in the Netherlands. He made his T20I debut for Italy against Germany on 25 May 2019. The same month, he was named in Italy's squad for the Regional Finals of the 2018–19 ICC T20 World Cup Europe Qualifier tournament in Guernsey. He played in Italy's opening match of the Regional Finals, against Norway, on 15 June 2019.

In November 2019, he was named in Italy's squad for the Cricket World Cup Challenge League B tournament in Oman. He made his List A debut, for Italy against Kenya, on 3 December 2019.
