= German cricket team against Italy in the Netherlands in 2019 =

German cricket team against Italy in 2019
	Germany	Italy
- Dates: 24 – 25 May 2019
Captains	Venkatraman Ganesan (Note: Venkatraman Ganesan was announced as Germany's captain, but Rishi Pillai captained the side as Ganesan did not play due to injury.)	Gayashan Munasinghe

Twenty20 International series
- Results: Italy won the 2-match series 2–0
Most runs	Sahir Naqash (38)	Joy Perera (88)
Most wickets	Ahmed Wardak (2); Izatullah Dawlatzai (2)	Nicholas Maiolo (4); Michael Ross (4)

The Germany cricket team toured the Netherlands in May 2019 to play two Twenty20 International (T20I) matches against Italy. These were the first T20I fixtures to be played by Italy, after the International Cricket Council announced that all matches played between Associate Members after 1 January 2019 would have full T20I status. Germany had played their first official T20I matches earlier in the month against Belgium. Both matches were played on 25 May 2019, with the teams using the fixtures as part of their preparation for the European Regional Qualifying Finals tournament for the 2019 ICC T20 World Cup Qualifier. Both teams played a 20-over warm up match against a Netherlands Development XI side on 24 May 2019. Italy won the T20I series 2–0, winning the first T20I by 7 wickets and the second by 6 wickets.

== Squads ==
Germany	Italy
Venkatraman Ganesan (c); Vijayshankar Chikkannaiah; Izatullah Dawlatzai; Sajid Liaqat; Amir Mangal; Asad Mohammad; Mudassar Muhammad; Sahir Naqash; Rishi Pillai; Abdul Shakoor; Harmanjot Singh; Ahmed Wardak; Daniel Weston (wk); Muslim Yar	Gayashan Munasinghe (c); Rehman Abdul; Shameera Arachchige; Rakibul Hasan; Fida Hussain; Qasim Janjua; Nicholas Maiolo; Gian-Piero Meade; Joy Perera; Michael Ross; Baljit Singh; Charanjeet Singh; Jaspreet Singh; Manpreet Singh (wk)

== Tour matches ==
=== 1st T20 match: Netherlands Development XI vs Italy ===
24 May 2019
11:00
Scorecard

Netherlands Development XI; 116/8 (20 overs)	v	Italy; 117/2 (13.1 overs)
Hidde Overdijk 39* (30); Shameera Arachchige 2/12 (3 overs)		Joy Perera 44 (27); Ben Cooper 1/21 (2 overs)

Italy won by 8 wickets
Sportpark Maarschalkerweerd, Utrecht

- Netherlands Development XI won the toss and elected to bat.

=== 2nd T20 match: Netherlands Development XI vs Germany ===
24 May 2019
16:00 (D/N)
Scorecard

Germany; 129/8 (20 overs)	v	Netherlands Development XI; 114/9 (20 overs)
Daniel Weston 32 (35); Hidde Overdijk 3/17 (4 overs)		Shirase Raoul Rasool 28 (25); Izatullah Dawlatzai 4/18 (4 overs)

Germany won by 15 runs
Sportpark Maarschalkerweerd, Utrecht

- Germany won the toss and elected to bat.

== T20I series ==
=== 1st T20I ===
25 May 2019
11:00
Scorecard

Germany; 53 (16 overs)	v	Italy; 57/3 (8.4 overs)
Ahmed Wardak 20* (27); Michael Ross 4/15 (4 overs)		Joy Perera 21 (10); Izatullah Dawlatzai 2/17 (4 overs)

Italy won by 7 wickets
Sportpark Maarschalkerweerd, Utrecht
Umpires: Rizwan Akram (Ned) and Huub Jansen (Ned)

- Germany won the toss and elected to bat.
- Rishi Pillai (Ger), Rehman Abdul, Shameera Arachchige, Rakibul Hasan, Fida Hussain, Nicholas Maiolo, Gian-Piero Meade, Gayashan Munasinghe, Joy Perera, Michael Ross, Baljit Singh and Manpreet Singh (Ita) all made their T20I debuts.

=== 2nd T20I ===
25 May 2019
16:00 (D/N)
Scorecard

Germany; 130/6 (20 overs)	v	Italy; 135/4 (15.3 overs)
Sahir Naqash 38* (17); Nicholas Maiolo 2/13 (4 overs)		Joy Perera 67 (34); Ahmed Wardak 2/8 (3 overs)

Italy won by 6 wickets
Sportpark Maarschalkerweerd, Utrecht
Umpires: Rizwan Akram (Ned) and Adriaan van den Dries (Ned)

- Italy won the toss and elected to field.
