= Fikri Makram =

Malaysian cricketer (born 1993)

Personal information
- Born: 29 June 1993 (age 33)

International information
- National side: Malaysia
Medal record
Representing Malaysia
Men's Cricket
Southeast Asian Games
Gold medal – first place	2017 Kuala Lumpur	50 over
- Source: Cricinfo, 23 May 2017

Mohamad Fikri Makram Rosdi (born 29 June 1993), known as Fikri Makram, is a Malaysian cricketer. He played for Malaysia in the 2014 ICC World Cricket League Division Five tournament in March 2014, and in the 2017 ICC World Cricket League Division Three tournament in May 2017.

He was a member of the Malaysian cricket team which claimed gold medal in the men's 50 overs tournament after defeating Singapore by 251 runs in the finals at the 2017 Southeast Asian Games.
