= Janaka Rathnayake =

Sri Lankan cricketer (born 1983)

Personal information
- Born: 10 June 1983 (age 43)
- Source: Cricinfo, 22 December 2019

Janaka Rathnayake (born 10 June 1983) is a Sri Lankan cricketer. He made his List A debut on 22 December 2019, for Police Sports Club in the 2019–20 Invitation Limited Over Tournament. He made his Twenty20 debut on 12 January 2020, for Police Sports Club in the 2019–20 SLC Twenty20 Tournament.
