= Bhongolwethu Makaleni =

South African cricketer (born 1994)

Personal information
- Born: 5 February 1994 (age 32)
- Source: Cricinfo, 1 March 2021

Bhongolwethu Makaleni (born 5 February 1994) is a South African cricketer. He made his List A debut on 1 March 2021, for Border in the 2020–21 CSA Provincial One-Day Challenge.
