= Rishi Pillai =

German cricketer (born 1981)

Personal information
- Born: 26 August 1981 (age 45); Pune, India
- Batting: Right-handed
- Bowling: Right-arm Medium

International information
- National side: Germany
- T20I debut (cap 17): 25 May 2019 v Italy
- Last T20I: 20 June 2019 v Jersey
- Source: Cricinfo, 20 June 2019

Rishi Pillai (born 26 August 1981) is a German cricketer. He was named as the captain of Germany's squad for the 2017 ICC World Cricket League Division Five tournament in South Africa. He played in Germany's opening fixture, against Ghana, on 3 September 2017. He scored the most runs for Germany in the tournament, with a total of 212 runs in five matches.

He made his Twenty20 International (T20I) debut against Italy, during Germany's two-match series in the Netherlands, on 25 May 2019. The same month, he was named in Germany's squad for the Regional Finals of the 2018–19 ICC T20 World Cup Europe Qualifier tournament in Guernsey.
