= Parag Dahiwal =

Singaporean cricketer (born 1983)

Parag Ashok Dahiwal (born 24 April 1983) is a player for the Singapore national cricket team. He was born in Pune, India. Parag Dahiwal is a slow left-arm orthodox spinner. He also represented Maharashtra state under 16, 19 and 22 age group teams and West Zone. Parag was also part of the under 16 India team camp in Hyderabad in 1998.
