= Gayashan Munasinghe =

Sri Lankan-born Italian cricketer

Personal information
- Full name: Gayashan Ranga de Silva Munasinghe
- Born: 7 October 1986 (age 40); Sri Lanka
- Batting: Right-handed
- Bowling: Right-arm medium-fast

International information
- National side: Italy
- T20I debut (cap 7): 25 May 2019 v Germany
- Last T20I: 20 June 2019 v Denmark

Career statistics
Competition	Twenty20
Matches	25
Runs scored	21
Batting average	5.25
100s/50s	0/0
Top score	11*
Balls bowled	461
Wickets	26
Bowling average	21.00
5 wickets in innings	0
10 wickets in match	0
Best bowling	4/11
Catches/stumpings	8/–
- Source: Cricinfo, 5 February 2023

Gayashan Ranga de Silva Munasinghe (born 7 October 1986) is a Sri Lankan-born Italian cricketer. Munasinghe is a right-handed batsman who bowls right-arm medium-fast.

His first appearance for Italy came against a Leinster Cricket Union President's XI in a warm up match for the 2008 European Cricket Championship Division One, though he made no appearances during the main tournament itself. He was then selected as part of Italy's squad for the 2008 World Cricket League Division Four in Tanzania, making four appearances. With the ball, he took 2 wickets in the tournament at an average of 32.50, with best figures of 1/32. With the bat, he scored 20 runs with a high score of 11 not out. His next appearance for Italy came in the 2010 European Cricket Championship Division One, in which he played five matches. He was then selected as part of Italy's squad for the 2010 World Cricket League Division Four, which was hosted by Italy. He made six appearances during the tournament, helping Italy earn promotion to the 2011 World Cricket League Division Three. Division Three was played in Hong Kong in January 2011, with Munasinghe selected as part of Italy's thirteen man squad. He played in all six of Italy's matches in the tournament, took 13 wickets during the tournament, at an average of 20.00, with best figures of 4/60.

In July 2011, Munasinghe played in the European T20 Championship in Jersey and Guernsey, which saw Italy end the tournament as runners-up to Denmark. This result qualified them to take part in the World Twenty20 Qualifier in the United Arab Emirates in March 2012. He was selected as part of Italy's fourteen man squad for the qualifier. He made his Twenty20 debut during the tournament against Oman, with him making eight further appearances, the last of which came against Kenya. In his nine matches, he took 4 wickets at an average of 41.25, with best figures of 1/6. With the bat, scored 11 runs. Italy finished the tournament in tenth place and therefore missed out on qualification for the 2012 World Twenty in Sri Lanka.

In April 2013, he was selected in Italy's fourteen man squad for the World Cricket League Division Three in Bermuda. In August 2017, he was named as captain of the Italian squad for the 2017 ICC World Cricket League Division Five tournament.

In May 2019, he was named as the captain of Italy's squad for their Twenty20 International (T20I) series against Germany in the Netherlands. He made his T20I debut for Italy against Germany on 25 May 2019. The same month, he was named as the captain of Italy's squad for the Regional Finals of the 2018–19 ICC T20 World Cup Europe Qualifier tournament in Guernsey.
