= Joy Perera =

Italian cricketer

Personal information
- Full name: Bentota Baduge Joy Lenin Perera
- Born: 12 June 1987 (age 39); Sri Lanka
- Batting: Right-handed
- Bowling: Right-arm medium
- Role: Occasional Wicket-keeper

International information
- National side: Italy (2010–)
- T20I debut (cap 8): 25 May 2019 v Germany
- Last T20I: 19 July 2022 v Isle of Man
- Source: ESPNcricinfo, 19 July 2022

Bentota Baduge Joy Lenin Perera (born 1 May 1987) is a Sri Lankan-born Italian former cricketer who debuted for the Italian national team in July 2010. He became an Italian citizen in 2021.

== Early life ==
Perera was born in Sri Lanka.

== Career ==
A right-handed middle-order batsman, Perera debuted for Italy at the 2010 European Championship in Jersey. He had little success, however, scoring just eight runs across three matches. At the 2013 World Twenty20 Qualifier in the United Arab Emirates, Perera played in all eight of Italy's matches. He made 52 runs from seven innings, with a highest score of 18 not out against Uganda. Perera returned to Italy's line-up for the 2014 World Cricket League Division Four tournament in Singapore, but played in only one match (against Oman). He appeared in five games at the 2015 European Twenty20 Division One tournament, and scored 57 runs with a highest of 23 against Norway.

In May 2019, he was named in Italy's squad for their Twenty20 International (T20I) series against Germany in the Netherlands. He made his T20I debut for Italy against Germany on 25 May 2019. The same month, he was named in Italy's squad for the Regional Finals of the 2018–19 ICC T20 World Cup Europe Qualifier tournament in Guernsey. In November 2019, he was named as the captain of Italy's squad for the Cricket World Cup Challenge League B tournament in Oman. He made his List A debut, for Italy against Kenya, on 3 December 2019.

In September 2021, he was named in Italy's T20I squad for the Regional Final of the 2021 ICC Men's T20 World Cup Europe Qualifier tournament.
