= Peter Ananya =

Ghanaian cricketer (born 1988)

Personal information
- Born: 23 June 1988 (age 38)

International information
- National side: Ghana
- Source: Cricinfo, 3 September 2017

Peter Ananya (born 23 June 1988) is a Ghanaian cricketer. He was named as the captain of Ghana's squad for the 2017 ICC World Cricket League Division Five tournament in South Africa. He played in Ghana's opening fixture, against Germany, on 3 September 2017, where he scored 20 runs.
