= Cricket World Cup qualification =

Preselection of teams

ICC Men's Cricket World Cup qualification
- Administrator: International Cricket Council
- Format: One Day International
- First edition: 1979
- Number of teams: 36 (currently eligible); 110 (overall)
- 2027 Cricket World Cup qualification

Cricket World Cup qualification is the process national cricket teams go through to qualify for the Cricket World Cup. The Cricket World Cup is a global event, and qualification is used to reduce the large field of participants from about 100 to 10–14. The qualification process has started as early as almost 7 years before the World Cup.

== History ==
From the first World Cup in 1975 up to the 2019 World Cup, the majority of teams taking part qualified automatically. Until the 2015 World Cup this was mostly through having Full Membership of the ICC, and for the 2019 World Cup this was mostly through ranking position in the ICC ODI Championship.

Since the second World Cup in 1979 up to the 2019 World Cup, the teams that qualified automatically have been joined by a small number of others who qualified for the World Cup through the qualification process. The number of teams qualifying for the World Cup changed from event to event. The first qualifying tournament being the ICC Trophy; later the process expanding with pre-qualifying tournaments. Pre-qualifying tournaments were held within the five ICC regional bodies (Africa, Americas, Asia, East Asia-Pacific, Europe), and organized by their respective councils.

For the 2011 World Cup onwards, the past pre-qualifying processes were replaced by the World Cricket League, administered by the ICC; and the ICC Trophy became known as the ICC World Cup Qualifier, and this remained the culmination of the qualification process and became the final stage of the World Cricket League competition. The World Cricket League was a series of international one-day cricket tournaments for national teams without Test status. All Associate members of the ICC were able to qualify for the World Cup.

While 12 teams participated in the 2009 ICC World Cup Qualifier and the top 4 teams qualified for the 2011 Cricket World Cup, at the ICC Chief Executives' Committee meeting in September 2011, the ICC decided on a new qualifying format for the 2015 Cricket World Cup. Two teams from the top tier of the pre-qualifying tournament, the 2011–13 ICC World Cricket League Championship, qualified directly and did not compete in the 2014 Cricket World Cup Qualifier, which decided the remaining two places.

For the 2019 World Cup, the host and the seven highest-ranked sides on the MRF Tyres ICC ODI Team Rankings as on 30 September 2017 qualified directly for the event proper. The four bottom-ranked sides were joined by six teams from the ICC World Cricket League in the 10-team ICC Cricket World Cup Qualifier 2018, and the top two sides completed the 10-team World Cup line-up.

For the 2023 World Cup, only the host nation qualified automatically. 32 teams were divided into three leagues—Super League, League 2 and Challenge League—each with different paths to World Cup qualification. The leagues and supplementary qualifier and play-off tournaments also determined promotion and relegation between the leagues from one World Cup cycle to the next. The fourth World Cricket League competition was used for the initial placement of teams into the leagues for the 2023 World Cup qualifying, and has now been abolished.

=== Qualification berths ===
	(England) 1975 (Note: Berths were given by invitation only.)	(England) 1979	(England) (Wales) 1983	(India) (Pakistan) 1987	(Australia) (New Zealand) 1992	(India) (Pakistan) (Sri Lanka) 1996	(England) (Wales) (Scotland) (Republic of Ireland) (Netherlands) 1999	(South Africa) (Zimbabwe) (Kenya) 2003	(Cricket West Indies) 2007	(India) (Sri Lanka) (Bangladesh) 2011	(Australia) (New Zealand) 2015	(England) (Wales) 2019	(India) 2023	(South Africa) (Zimbabwe) (Namibia) 2027	(India) (Bangladesh) 2031
Total berths	8	8	8	8	9	12	12	14	16	14	14	10	10	14	
Entered qualification (Note: Includes all teams that entered qualification, even if they withdrew or were excluded afterwards or qualified by walkover. Does not include pre-determined automatic qualifiers.)	—	15	16	16	17	20	22	24	64 (Note: 2 teams were participated in qualification, and were not eligible to enter the final competition, as they were not a member of ICC.(South Africa Country Districts, ECB England XI))				32	36	
Played in qualification (Note: Only includes teams that played at least one qualifying match that was not annulled.)	—	15	16	16	17	20	22	24	64				32	36	
Qualified via qualification	—	2	1	1	1	3	3	4	6	4	4	2	9	4	
Qualified without playing	8	6	7	7	8	9	9	10	10	10	10	8	1 (Note: India were qualified as host, but they also participated in qualification.)	10	

=== First appearance in qualification by team ===
Only teams that played at least one match are considered for first appearance. Teams that withdrew before the qualification, or that qualified to the World Cup by walkover due to other teams' withdrawals, are not considered.

Year	Debuting teams							Successor and renamed teams
Year	Asia	Africa	Americas	East-Asia Pacific	Europe	T	CT	Successor and renamed teams
1975	No qualification was held all the teams were invitees.							
1979	Bangladesh; Malaysia; Singapore; Sri Lanka (Note: Participated in the 1975 World Cup by invitation.)	East Africa (Note: East Africa was renamed as East and Central Africa.)	Argentina; Bermuda; Canada; United States	Fiji; Papua New Guinea	Denmark; Israel; Netherlands; Wales (Note: Wales currently competes with England under the name of England.)	15	15	
1983	Hong Kong	Kenya; West Africa (Note: Team now defunct.); Zimbabwe	none	none	Gibraltar	5	20	
1987	none	none	none	none	none	0	20	
1992	none	none	none	none	none	0	20	East and Central Africa
1996	United Arab Emirates	Namibia	none	none	Ireland	3	23	
1999	none	none	none	none	Italy; Scotland	2	25	
2003	Nepal	Uganda	none	none	France; Germany	4	29	
2007	Afghanistan; Bahrain; Bhutan; Iran; Kuwait; Oman; Qatar; Saudi Arabia; Thailand	Botswana; Gambia; Ghana; Mozambique; Nigeria; Rwanda; Sierra Leone; Tanzania; Zambia	Bahamas; Belgium; Cayman Islands; Panama; Suriname; Turks and Caicos Islands	Indonesia; Japan; Tonga	Austria; Belgium; Croatia; Finland; Greece; Luxembourg; Malta; Norway; Portugal; Spain	31	60	
2011	none	none	none	Vanuatu	Jersey	2	62	
2015	Brunei; China; Maldives; Myanmar	Lesotho; Malawi; Swaziland	Brazil; Belize; Chile; Costa Rica; Falkland Islands; Mexico; Peru	Cook Islands; Samoa; Vanuatu	Bulgaria; Cyprus; Czech Republic; Estonia; Guernsey; Isle of Man; Slovenia; Turkey	25	87	
2019	none	none	West Indies (Note: Participated in the 1975 World Cup by invitation, 1979 to 2015 World Cups as Full member.)	none	none	1	88	
2023	India (Note: Participated in the 1975 World Cup by invitation, 1979 to 2015 World Cups as Full member, 2019 via top 7 ranked team.); Pakistan	South Africa (Note: Participated in the 1992 to 2015 World Cups as Full member.)	none	Australia; New Zealand	England	6	94	
2027	none	none	none	none	none	0	94	

Teams' entries before their actual debuts in qualification

Successor and renamed teams

Other notes

== Team performances ==
The teams that qualified automatically each time, and the performances of the other teams in the final qualifying tournament, are as follows.

World Cup:	1975 WC	1979 WC	1983 WC	1987 WC	1992 WC	1996 WC	1999 WC	2003 WC	2007 WC	2011 WC	2015 WC		2019 WC	2023 WC	2027 WC
Qualifying Tournament:	None	1979 ICC Trophy	1982 ICC Trophy	1986 ICC Trophy	1990 ICC Trophy	1994 ICC Trophy	1997 ICC Trophy	2001 ICC Trophy	2005 ICC Trophy	2009 WC Qual	2011 WCL C'ship	2014 WC Qual	2018 WC Qual	2023 WC Qual	2027 WC Qual
Pre-qualifying:									2007 Qual	2007–09 WCL	2009–14 WCL		2012–18 WCL	2017–19 WCL	
Africa
Kenya			R1	R1	SF	2nd	2nd	Auto (O)	Auto (O)	4th	6th	5th		=27th	
Namibia						R1	15th	2nd	7th	8th	7th	6th		19th	
South Africa					Auto (F)	Auto (F)	Auto (F)	Auto (F)	Auto (F)	Auto (F)	Auto (F)		Auto (R)	8th	Auto (H)
Uganda									12th	10th		10th		=23rd	
Zimbabwe			1st	1st	1st	Auto (F)	Auto (F)	Auto (F)	Auto (F)	Auto (F)	Auto (F)		3rd	12th	Auto (H)
Americas
Argentina		R1		R1	R1	R1	21st	R1							
Bermuda		SF	2nd	4th	R1	4th	9th	R1	4th	9th				=31st	
Canada		2nd	R1	R1	R2	R2	7th	3rd	3rd	2nd	8th	8th		20th	
United States		R1	R1	R1	R2	R1	12th	7th	10th					18th	
West Indies	Auto (F)	Auto (F)	Auto (F)	Auto (F)	Auto (F)	Auto (F)	Auto (F)	Auto (F)	Auto (F)	Auto (F)	Auto (F)		2nd	13th	
Asia
Afghanistan										5th	2nd		1st	7th	
Bangladesh		R1	4th	R1	SF	R2	1st	Auto (F)	Auto (F)	Auto (F)	Auto (F)		Auto (R)	3rd	
Hong Kong			R1	R1	R1	R2	8th	R1				3rd	10th	=25th	
India	Auto (F)	Auto (F)	Auto (F)	Auto (F)	Auto (F)	Auto (F)	Auto (F)	Auto (F)	Auto (F)	Auto (F)	Auto (F)		Auto (R)	Auto (H)	
Malaysia		R1	R1	R1	R1	R1	16th	R1						=29th	
Nepal								R1				9th	8th	16th	
Oman									9th	11th				14th	
Pakistan	Auto (F)	Auto (F)	Auto (F)	Auto (F)	Auto (F)	Auto (F)	Auto (F)	Auto (F)	Auto (F)	Auto (F)	Auto (F)		Auto (R)	5th	
Qatar														=25th	
Singapore		R1	R1		R1	19th	14th	R1						=27th	
Sri Lanka	Auto (I)	1st	Auto (F)	Auto (F)	Auto (F)	Auto (F)	Auto (F)	Auto (F)	Auto (F)	Auto (F)	Auto (F)		Auto (R)	9th	
United Arab Emirates						1st	10th	5th	6th	7th	3rd	2nd	6th	17th	
East Asia-Pacific
Australia	Auto (F)	Auto (F)	Auto (F)	Auto (F)	Auto (F)	Auto (F)	Auto (F)	Auto (F)	Auto (F)	Auto (F)	Auto (F)		Auto (R)	6th	
Fiji		R1	R1	R1	R1	R1	11th	R1							
New Zealand	Auto (F)	Auto (F)	Auto (F)	Auto (F)	Auto (F)	Auto (F)	Auto (F)	Auto (F)	Auto (F)	Auto (F)	Auto (F)		Auto (R)	1st	
Papua New Guinea		R1	3rd	R1	R2	R1	13th	R1	11th			4th	9th	22nd	
Vanuatu														=31st	
Europe
Denmark		SF		3rd	R2	R1	5th	6th	8th	12th				=23rd	
England	Auto (F)	Auto (F)	Auto (F)	Auto (F)	Auto (F)	Auto (F)	Auto (F)	Auto (F)	Auto (F)	Auto (F)	Auto (F)		Auto (H)	2nd	
France								R1							
Germany								R1							
Gibraltar			R1	R1	R1	20th	=19th	R1							
Ireland						R2	4th	8th	2nd	1st	1st		5th	15th	
Israel		R1	R1	R1	R1	R1	22nd	R1							
Italy							=19th	R1						=29th	
Jersey														21st	
Netherlands		R1	R1	2nd	2nd	3rd	6th	1st	5th	3rd	4th	7th	7th	10th	
Scotland							3rd	4th	1st	6th	5th	1st	4th	11th	
Defunct teams
East Africa	Auto (I)	R1	R1	R1											
East and Central Africa					R1	18th	17th	R1							
Wales		R1													
West Africa			R1			17th	18th	R1							

Key:

Auto (F)	Team qualified for Cricket World Cup automatically through having Full Membership of the ICC
Auto (H)	Team qualified for Cricket World Cup automatically as Host
Auto (I)	Team qualified for Cricket World Cup automatically by Invitation
Auto (O)	Team qualified for Cricket World Cup automatically through having ODI Status
Auto (R)	Team qualified for Cricket World Cup automatically by Ranking position in the ICC ODI Championship
	Team qualified for Cricket World Cup through the Qualifying Tournament
R1/R2	Team reached First Round/Second Round in the Qualifying Tournament
SF	Team reached Semi-Final in the Qualifying Tournament (no third-place play-off)
1st/2nd/etc	Team finished 1st/2nd/etc in the Qualifying Tournament
	Team failed to reach final Qualifying Tournament

== See also ==
- World Cricket League
