= 2017 ICC World Cricket League Africa Region Qualifiers =

- Dates: 7 – 13 April 2017
- Administrator(s): International Cricket Council
- Cricket format: Limited-overs (50 overs)
- Tournament format(s): Round-robin and Knockout
- Host(s): South Africa
- Participants: 6

The 2017 ICC World Cricket League Africa Region Qualifiers is an international cricket tournament that is scheduled to take place in Benoni, South Africa. The winner of the qualifiers will progress to ICC WCL Division 5 which will be staged in September 2017.

== Teams ==
Six teams invited by ICC for the tournament:

- Botswana
- Ghana
- Nigeria
- Sierra Leone
- Tanzania
- Zambia

== Points table ==
Team	P	W	L	T	NR	Points	NRR	Status
Ghana	5	5	0	0	0	10	+1.994	Qualify for 2017 ICC World Cricket League Division Five
Botswana	5	3	1	0	1	7	+0.420	Did not Qualify for 2017 ICC World Cricket League Division Five
Tanzania	5	3	2	0	0	6	+1.127	Did not Qualify for 2017 ICC World Cricket League Division Five
Nigeria	5	2	2	0	1	5	-0.704	Did not Qualify for 2017 ICC World Cricket League Division Five
Zambia	5	1	4	0	0	2	-0.770	Did not Qualify for 2017 ICC World Cricket League Division Five
Sierra Leone	5	0	5	0	0	0	-1.942	Did not Qualify for 2017 ICC World Cricket League Division Five

Source: Cricinfo

== Fixtures ==
7 April

Tanzania; 231 (50.0 overs)	v	Nigeria; 83 (34.4 overs)

Tanzania won by 148 runs
Willowmoore Park, Benoni
Umpires: S George and D Odhiambo (Kenya)
Player of the match: Jintin Singh (Tanzania)

- Nigeria won the toss and chose to field

7 April

Ghana; 179 (42.5 overs)	v	Sierra Leone; 66 (32.5 overs)

Ghana won by 113 runs
Willowmoore Park, Benoni
Umpires: PM Musoke (Uganda) and IO Oyieko (Kenya)
Player of the match: DNA Ankrah (Ghana)

- Sierra Leone won the toss and elected to bowl

7 April

Botswana; 135 (44.1 overs)	v	Zambia; 54 (23.3 overs)

Botswana won by 81 runs
Willowmoore Park, Benoni
Umpires: R D'Mello (Kenya) and A Louw (Namibia)
Player of the match: T Tshose (Botswana)

- Zambia won the toss and elected to bowl

8 April

Zambia; 199 (46.2 overs)	v	Sierra Leone; 158 (47.2 overs)

Zambia won by 41 runs
Willowmoore Park, Benoni
Umpires: VR Angara (Botswana) and S George
Player of the match: J Zimba (Zambia)

- Zambia won the toss and elected to bat

8 April

Nigeria; 51 (28.3 overs)	v	Ghana; 52/6 (13.5 overs)

Ghana won by 4 wickets
Willowmoore Park, Benoni
Umpires: F Ekalunga (Uganda) and IO Oyieko (Kenya)
Player of the match: G Bakiweyem (Ghana)

- Ghana won the toss and elected to field

8 April

Botswana; 154 (49.3 overs)	v	Tanzania; 128 (40.5 overs)

Botswana won by 26 runs
Willowmoore Park, Benoni
Umpires: R D'Mello (Kenya) and C Thorburn (Namibia)
Player of the match: KN Mussa (Tanzania)

- Tanzania won the toss and elected to bowl

10 April

Botswana; 154 (46.2 overs)	v	Ghana; 155/6 (34.4 overs)

Ghana won by 4 wickets
Willowmoore Park, Benoni
Umpires: D Odhiambo (Kenya) and C Thorburn (Namibia)
Player of the match: S Ateak (Ghana)

- Ghana won the toss and elected to bowl

10 April

Zambia; 207/8 (50 overs)	v	Tanzania; 208/8 (49.1 overs)

Tanzania won by 2 wickets
Willowmoore Park, Benoni
Umpires: VR Angara (Botswana) and IO Oyieko (Kenya)
Player of the match: A Dagar (Tanzania)

- Tanzania won the toss and elected to bowl

10 April

Nigeria; 181 (48.3 overs)	v	Sierra Leone; 90 (36.4 overs)

Nigeria won by 91 runs
Willowmoore Park, Benoni
Umpires: F Ekalunga (Uganda) and A Louw (Namibia)
Player of the match: OA Olympio (Nigeria)

- Nigeria won the toss and elected to bat

11 April

Zambia; 152 (42.5 overs)	v	Nigeria; 153/7 (37.1 overs)

Nigeria won by 3 wickets
Willowmoore Park, Benoni
Umpires: D Odhiambo (Kenya) and C Thorburn (Namibia)
Player of the match: AS Abioye (Nigeria)

- Zambia won the toss and elected to bat

11 April

Sierra Leone; 137 (48.5 overs)	v	Botswana; 138/8 (44.3 overs)

Botswana won by 2 wickets
Willowmoore Park, Benoni
Umpires: A Louw (Namibia) and D Odhiambo (Kenya)
Player of the match: K Motlanka (Botswana)

- Sierra Leone won the toss and elected to bat

11 April

Tanzania; 133/9 (50 overs)	v	Ghana; 134/5 (37.4 overs)

Ghana won by 5 wickets
Willowmoore Park, Benoni
Umpires: PM Musoke (Uganda) and C Thorburn (Namibia)
Player of the match: V Ateak (Ghana)

- Ghana won the toss and elected to bowl

13 April

Tanzania; 229/5 (34 overs)	v	Sierra Leone; 80/8 (23.5 overs)

Tanzania won by 165 runs (D/L method)
Willowmoore Park, Benoni
Umpires: A Louw (Namibia) and D Odhiambo (Kenya)
Player of the match: KN Mussa (Tanzania)

- Tanzania won the toss and elected to bat
- Rain reduced Sierra Leone's innings to 23.5 overs with a target of 246 runs

13–14 April

Botswana; 117/5 (25 overs)	v	Nigeria; 100/8 (16.2 overs)

No result
Willowmoore Park, Benoni
Umpires: R D'Mello (Kenya) and S George

- Botswana won the toss and elected to bat
- Rain reduced Botswana's innings to 25 overs and also Nigeria's innings has been reduced to 20 overs with a target of 163
- The match was supposed to replay on April 14 but it didn't due to Bad Light

13 April

Zambia; 60 (20.3 overs)	v	Ghana; 49/1 (8.1 overs)

Ghana won by 9 wickets (D/L method)
Willowmoore Park, Benoni
Umpires: VR Angara (Botswana) and D Odhiambo (Kenya)
Player of the match: G Bakiweyem (Ghana)

- Zambia won the toss and elected to bat
- The rain has reduced Ghana's innings to 32 overs with a target of 49 runs
