= 2009–2014 World Cricket League =

2009–14 ICC World Cricket League
- Administrator: International Cricket Council
- Cricket format: One Day International; List A
- Tournament format(s): Round-robin and Knockout

A series of ICC World Cricket League tournaments and the 2014 Cricket World Cup Qualifier were played between 2009 and 2014 which formed part of the Cricket World Cup qualification process for the 2015 Cricket World Cup. It was the second time the World Cricket League was used for World Cup qualification. Following the establishment of the various leagues during the preceding cycle, it was composed of eight divisions. In addition, a series of qualifying regional tournaments were played. The divisions were played in roughly consecutive order, with the lower divisions played first. The top two from each division gained promotion to the following, higher division, meaning that some teams played in more than one division during the tournament. The first tournament, in May 2009, was the 2009 ICC World Cricket League Division Seven in Guernsey.

== Tournaments summary ==
Details	Dates	Host nation(s)	Final			
Details	Dates	Host nation(s)	Venue	Winner	Result	Runner-up
2009; Division Seven	17–24 May 2009	Guernsey	King George V Sports Ground, Castel	Bahrain; 207/7 (46.1 overs)	Bahrain won by 3 wickets Scorecard	Guernsey; 204/9 (50.0 overs)
2009; Division Six	29 August – 5 September 2009	Singapore	Kallang Cricket Ground, Singapore	Singapore; 242/8 (50.0 overs)	Singapore won by 68 runs Scorecard	Bahrain; 174 all out (48.4 overs)
2010; Division Five	20–27 February 2010	Nepal	Tribhuvan University International Cricket Ground, Kirtipur	Nepal; 175/5 (46.5 overs)	Nepal won by 5 wickets Scorecard	United States; 172 all out (47.2 overs)
2010; Division One	1–10 July 2010	Netherlands	VRA Ground, Amstelveen	Ireland; 233/4 (44.5 overs)	Ireland won by 6 wickets Scorecard	Scotland; 232 all out (48.5 overs)
2010; Division Four	14–21 August 2010	Italy	Ovale di Rastignano, Pianoro	United States; 188/2 (21.4 overs)	United States won by 8 wickets Scorecard	Italy; 185/9 (50 overs)
2010; Division Eight	6–12 November 2010	Kuwait	Kuwait Oil Company Hubara Ground, Ahmadi City	Kuwait; 164/4 (33.1 overs)	Kuwait won by 6 wickets Scorecard	Germany; 163/8 (50 overs)
2011; Division Three	22–29 January 2011	Hong Kong	Kowloon Cricket Club	Hong Kong; 207/6 (47.1 overs)	Hong Kong won by 4 wickets Scorecard	Papua New Guinea; 202 (50 overs)
2011; Division Two	8–15 April 2011	United Arab Emirates	DSC Cricket Stadium, Dubai	United Arab Emirates; 201/5 (45.3 overs)	United Arab Emirates won by 5 wickets Scorecard	Namibia; 200 (49.3 overs)
2011; Division Seven	1–8 May 2011	Botswana	Botswana Cricket Association Oval 1, Gaborone	Kuwait; 219/9 (50 overs)	Kuwait won by 72 runs Scorecard	Nigeria; 147 (36.5 overs)
2011; Division Six	17–24 September 2011	Malaysia	Kinrara Academy Oval, Kuala Lumpur	Guernsey; 211/8 (49.3 overs)	Guernsey won by 2 wickets Scorecard	Malaysia; 208/9 (50 overs)
2012; Division Five	18–25 February 2012	Singapore	Kallang Ground, Singapore	Singapore; 164/1 (26.4 overs)	Singapore won by 9 wickets Scorecard	Malaysia; 159 (47 overs)
2012; Division Four	3–10 September 2012	Malaysia	Kinrara Academy Oval, Kuala Lumpur	Nepal; 147/2 (28 overs)	Nepal won by 8 wickets Scorecard	United States; 145 (48.1 overs)
2013; Division Three	28 April – 5 May 2013	Bermuda	National Stadium, Hamilton	Nepal; 153/5 (39.2 overs)	Nepal won by 5 wickets Scorecard	Uganda; 151/8 (50.0 overs)
2011–13; Championship	28 June – 4 October 2013	Various	No final	Ireland; 24 points	League; Table	Afghanistan; 19 points
2014; WC Qualifier	2014	New Zealand	Bert Sutcliffe Oval, Lincoln	Scotland; 285/5 (50.0 Overs)	Scotland won by 41 runs Scorecard	United Arab Emirates; 244/9 (50.0 overs)

== Teams ==
Team	Division at start	2009		2010				2011				2012		2013		2014	Division at end
Team	Division at start	Div Seven	Div Six	Div Five	Div One	Div Four	Div Eight	Div Three	Div Two	Div Seven	Div Six	Div Five	Div Four	Div Three	C'ship	WCQ	Division at end
Afghanistan	1				3										2		ODI
Canada	1				5										8†	8 ▼	2
Ireland	1				1										1		ODI
Kenya	1				6										6†	5 ▼	2
Netherlands	1				4										4†	7 ▼	2
Scotland	1				2										5†	1	C
Argentina	4					6 ▼						6 ▼					6
Bahamas	R						8 ▼										R
Bahrain	7	1 ▲	2 ▲	3								5 ▼					6
Bermuda	2								6 ▼					4			3
Bhutan	R						7 ▼										R
Botswana	6		5 ▼							4							7
Cayman Islands	4					5 ▼						4					5
Denmark	3							5 ▼					4				4
Fiji	5			6 ▼							6 ▼						7
Germany	R						2 ▲			3							7
Gibraltar	7	6 ▼					6 ▼										R
Guernsey	7	2 ▲	3								1 ▲	3					5
Hong Kong	3							1 ▲	4 †							3 ▲	C
Italy	4					2 ▲		4						6 ▼			4
Japan	7	4								6 ▼							8
Jersey	5			5 ▼							4						6
Kuwait	R						1 ▲			1 ▲	3						6
Malaysia	6		4								2 ▲	2 ▲	5 ▼				5
Namibia	2								2 ▲						7†	6 ▼	2
Nepal	5			1 ▲		3							1 ▲	1 †		9	3
Nigeria	7	3								2 ▲	5 ▼						7
Norway	6		6 ▼							5 ▼							8
Oman	3							3						5 ▼			4
Papua New Guinea	3							2 ▲	3 †							4 ▲	C
Singapore	6		1 ▲	4								1 ▲	3				4
Suriname	7	5 ▼					5 ▼										R
Tanzania	4					4							6 ▼				5
Uganda	2								5 ▼					2 †		10	3
United Arab Emirates	2								1 ▲						3†	2	C
United States	5			2 ▲		1 ▲		6 ▼					2 ▲	3			3
Vanuatu	R						3										8
Zambia	R						4 ▼										R

Key
	Team with ODI status
	Team qualifies for 2015 ICC Cricket World Cup
C	Team qualifies for 2015–17 ICC World Cricket League Championship
▲	Team promoted to a higher division
Same position	Team remains in the division
▼	Team relegated to a lower division
R	Team qualified from or relegated to regional tournament
ODI	Team enters the main ODI rankings.
†	Team qualifies for 2014 Cricket World Cup Qualifier

== Regional tournaments ==
=== 2009–10 ===
Regional tournaments
Africa	Americas	Asia	East Asia-Pacific	Europe
2010 Division Two 1st. Zambia; 2nd. Ghana; 3rd. Swaziland; 4th. Sierra Leone; 5th. Mozambique; 6th. Malawi Zambia qualify for 2010 Global Division Eight	2010 Division One 1st. Canada; 2nd. United States; 3rd. Bermuda; 4th. Argentina; 5th. Cayman Islands; 6th. Bahamas Bahamas relegated to 2012 Americas Division Two	2010 ACC Trophy Elite 1st. Afghanistan; 2nd. Nepal; 3rd. Hong Kong; 4th. Malaysia; 5th. Oman; 6th. United Arab Emirates; 7th. Kuwait; 8th. Bhutan; 9th. Singapore; 10th.Bahrain* Singapore and Bahrain relegated to 2012 ACC Trophy Challenge: Bahrain withdrew due to visa problems	2009 EAP Division One 1st. Papua New Guinea; 2nd. Fiji; 3rd. Japan	2010 Division One 1st. Jersey; 2nd. Ireland A 3rd. Scotland A 4th. Netherlands A 5th. Denmark; 6th. Italy
2009 Division Three 1st. Malawi; 2nd. Sierra Leone; 3rd. Rwanda; 4th. Gambia; 5th. Lesotho Malawi and Sierra Leone promoted to 2010 Africa Division Two Morocco withdrew due to visa problems	2010 Division Two 1st. Bahamas; 2nd. Suriname; 3rd. Panama; 4th. Turks and Caicos Islands; 5th. Brazil Bahamas promoted to 2010 Americas Division One and qualify for 2010 Global Division Eight Brazil relegated to 2011 Americas Division Three	2010 ACC Trophy Challenge 1st. Maldives; 2nd. Saudi Arabia; 3rd. Qatar; 4th. Thailand; 5th. Iran; 6th. China; 7th. Brunei; 8th. Myanmar Maldives and Saudi Arabia qualify for 2012 ACC Trophy Elite	2009 EAP Division Two 1st. Vanuatu; 2nd. Samoa; 3rd. Cook Islands; 4th. Tonga; 5th. Indonesia Vanuatu qualify for 2010 Global Division Eight	2010 Division Two 1st. Guernsey; 2nd. Germany; 3rd. France; 4th. Norway; 5th. Israel; 6th. Gibraltar Germany qualify for 2010 Global Division Eight
2009 Division Three 1st. Malawi; 2nd. Sierra Leone; 3rd. Rwanda; 4th. Gambia; 5th. Lesotho Malawi and Sierra Leone promoted to 2010 Africa Division Two Morocco withdrew due to visa problems	2009 Division Three 1st. Brazil; 2nd. Belize; 3rd. Chile; 4th. Peru Brazil promoted to 2010 Americas Division Two	2010 ACC Trophy Challenge 1st. Maldives; 2nd. Saudi Arabia; 3rd. Qatar; 4th. Thailand; 5th. Iran; 6th. China; 7th. Brunei; 8th. Myanmar Maldives and Saudi Arabia qualify for 2012 ACC Trophy Elite	2009 EAP Division Two 1st. Vanuatu; 2nd. Samoa; 3rd. Cook Islands; 4th. Tonga; 5th. Indonesia Vanuatu qualify for 2010 Global Division Eight	2009 Division Three 1st. Israel; 2nd. Isle of Man; 3rd. Spain; 4th. Belgium; 5th. Portugal; 6th. Malta Israel beat Croatia to qualify for 2010 Europe Division Two.
2009 Division Three 1st. Malawi; 2nd. Sierra Leone; 3rd. Rwanda; 4th. Gambia; 5th. Lesotho Malawi and Sierra Leone promoted to 2010 Africa Division Two Morocco withdrew due to visa problems	2010 Division Four 1st. Mexico; 2nd. Falkland Islands; 3rd. Costa Rica	2010 ACC Trophy Challenge 1st. Maldives; 2nd. Saudi Arabia; 3rd. Qatar; 4th. Thailand; 5th. Iran; 6th. China; 7th. Brunei; 8th. Myanmar Maldives and Saudi Arabia qualify for 2012 ACC Trophy Elite	2009 EAP Division Two 1st. Vanuatu; 2nd. Samoa; 3rd. Cook Islands; 4th. Tonga; 5th. Indonesia Vanuatu qualify for 2010 Global Division Eight	
2009 Division Three 1st. Malawi; 2nd. Sierra Leone; 3rd. Rwanda; 4th. Gambia; 5th. Lesotho Malawi and Sierra Leone promoted to 2010 Africa Division Two Morocco withdrew due to visa problems	2010 Division Four 1st. Mexico; 2nd. Falkland Islands; 3rd. Costa Rica	2010 ACC Trophy Challenge 1st. Maldives; 2nd. Saudi Arabia; 3rd. Qatar; 4th. Thailand; 5th. Iran; 6th. China; 7th. Brunei; 8th. Myanmar Maldives and Saudi Arabia qualify for 2012 ACC Trophy Elite	2009 EAP Division Two 1st. Vanuatu; 2nd. Samoa; 3rd. Cook Islands; 4th. Tonga; 5th. Indonesia Vanuatu qualify for 2010 Global Division Eight	2009 Division Four 1st. Cyprus; 2nd. Switzerland; 3rd. Austria; 4th. Luxembourg; 5th. Finland; 6th. Slovenia
2009 Division Three 1st. Malawi; 2nd. Sierra Leone; 3rd. Rwanda; 4th. Gambia; 5th. Lesotho Malawi and Sierra Leone promoted to 2010 Africa Division Two Morocco withdrew due to visa problems	2010 Division Four 1st. Mexico; 2nd. Falkland Islands; 3rd. Costa Rica	2010 ACC Trophy Challenge 1st. Maldives; 2nd. Saudi Arabia; 3rd. Qatar; 4th. Thailand; 5th. Iran; 6th. China; 7th. Brunei; 8th. Myanmar Maldives and Saudi Arabia qualify for 2012 ACC Trophy Elite	2009 EAP Division Two 1st. Vanuatu; 2nd. Samoa; 3rd. Cook Islands; 4th. Tonga; 5th. Indonesia Vanuatu qualify for 2010 Global Division Eight	2009 Division Five 1st. Greece; 2nd. Sweden; 3rd. Czech Republic; 4th. Bulgaria; 5th. Estonia; 6th. Turkey
