= 2008 ICC World Cricket League Africa Region Division Three =

- Administrator: African Cricket Association
- Cricket format: 50 overs per side
- Tournament format: round robin with playoffs
- Host: South Africa
- Champions: Ghana
- Participants: 8
- Matches: 20
- Most runs: (Ghana) James Vifah 172
- Most wickets: (Ghana) Isaac Aboagye 14

The 2008 ICC World Cricket League Africa Region Division Three was a cricket tournament in South Africa, taking place between 13 and 18 April 2008. It gave seven African Associate and Affiliate members of the International Cricket Council experience of international one-day cricket and formed part of the global World Cricket League structure.

The top two teams, Malawi and Sierra Leone was promoted to Division 2.

== Teams ==
There were eight teams that played in the tournament, but Morocco withdrew due to visa problems and was replaced by a South African Invitation XI. These teams were non-test member nations of the African Cricket Association. The teams that played were:

Pool 1

- Sierra Leone
- Lesotho
- Rwanda
- Malawi

Pool 2

- Gambia
- Ghana
- Swaziland
- South African Invitation XI (replaced Morocco)

== Squads ==
Gambia	Ghana	Lesotho	Malawi
Zaccheus Akila; Moses Bahoum; Peter Campbell; Aniru Conteh; Bakary Darboe; Mbye Dumbuya; George Greywoode; Prince Johnson; Musa Sillah; Johnny Gomez; Alfred Crookes; Nicolas Cherry; Muhammad Camara; Wilfred Riley	Abdul-Karim Sumaila; Isaac Aboagye; Peter Ananya; Bhupinder Brar; Mark Bawa; James Vifah; Julius Mensah; Lawrence Ateak; Simon Ateak; Francis Dake; J Eyiah; Rufus Ntiamoah	Atanase Mohapi; Malebanye Nkoko; Irshad Patel; Rizuan Mulla; Faizal Hanslod; Osler Mohale; Sameer Patel; Tsepo Muso; Motsielo Nonyane; K Tau; Thabiso Mohape; S Abdulla; David Lechesa; Sajid Patel	Karamutallah Chaudry; Faraz Junejo; Muzakkir Khan; Altaf Panjwani; Jayendrasinh Kumar; Seraz Zaveri; Rupesh Patel; Henry Njoka; Alidi Bwanali; MS Chinoy; Aubrey Msosa; Obert Msosa; Kalpesh Patel

Rwanda	Sierra Leone	South African Invitation XI	Swaziland
Emmanuel Byiringiro; Eric Dusabemungu; Eric Dusingizimana; Andre Kayitera; Dennis Mukama; Evode Mutuyimana; Samal Subhasis; Srinath Vardineni; Mehboob Jasat; Mohamed Jasat; Julius Mbaraga; Hamza Nkuutu	Gabriel Anthony; Julius Brewah; Mustapha Kallon; Abubakarr Kamara; Emmanuel Kamara; Lansana Lamin; Jacob Mansaray; Mohamed Mansaray; Luseni Senesie; Ben Slater; George Kpundeh; Ibrahim Sesay; Mohamed Kamara	Malusi Dlamini; Buntu Ndlela; Phalini Kubeka; Clayton Ceronio; Andre Henning; M Mahlangu; Ruan du Plessis; T Steynburg; S Tshabalala; Bongani Rafedile; E Badana; Nelson Rubela; M Coetzee; D Mahoa; Welsh Mavumengwana; B Radebe	Joseph Wright; Abdul Patel; Marius Uys; Stephen Uys; Mangaliso Mhlabane; Haris Rashid; Syed Shahzad; Ernestes Uys; Sohail Khan; Alexander Nicholas; Adrisbhai Patel; A Haji; Mohamed Hansrod; M Khan; Stephen Nodder

== Group stage ==
=== Points Table ===
Pool 1
Team	P	W	L	T	NR	NRR	Points
Sierra Leone	3	3	0	0	0	+2.216	6
Rwanda	3	2	1	0	0	+0.249	4
Lesotho	3	1	2	0	0	−1.313	2
Malawi	3	0	3	0	0	−1.088	0

Pool 2
Team	P	W	L	T	NR	NRR	Points
South African Invitation XI†	3	3	0	0	0	+2.398	6
Ghana	3	2	1	0	0	+0.556	4
Swaziland	3	1	2	0	0	−0.451	2
Gambia	3	0	3	0	0	−2.360	0

Team qualifies for Semifinals
Team qualifies for 5th place playoff semifinals

†Tournament rules did not allow them to participate in the semifinals, and their place was taken by Eswatini (third in Pool 2).

=== Group stage ===
13 April 2008
Scorecard

Swaziland; 197/9 (50 overs)	v	Ghana; 199/3 (34.2 overs)
Adrisbhai Patel 90 (135); Bhupinder Brar 2/27 (5 overs)		James Vifah 109 (87); Mangaliso Mhlabane 1/27 (5 overs)

Ghana won by 7 wickets
Willowmoore Park, Benoni
Umpires: Unknown
Player of the match: James Vifah

13 April 2008
Scorecard

Sierra Leone; 201/6 (50 overs)	v	Lesotho; 122/7 (34 overs)
Abu Kamara 61 (79); Motsielo Nonyane 3/43 (8 overs)		Faizal Hanslod 41* (44); Abu Kamara 4/14 (10 overs)

Sierra Leone won by 38 runs (D/L)
Willowmoore Park B Field, Benoni
Umpires: Subhash Modi (KEN) & T Molefe (RSA)
Player of the match: Abu Kamara

- Rain stopped play during Lesotho's innings. Revised target is set at 161 runs off 34 overs.

13 April 2008
Scorecard

Malawi; 199/8 (50 overs)	v	Rwanda; 111/3 (30 overs)
Seraz Zaveri 48* (45); Muzakkir Khan 48 (114); Srinath Vardineni 3/58 (10 overs)		Srinath Vardineni 29* (43); Jayendrasinh Kumar 2/18 (7 overs)

Rwanda won by 10 (D/L)
Willowmoore Park C Field, Benoni
Umpires: A Gawe (RSA) & David Odhiambo (KEN)
Player of the match: Srinath Vardineni

- Rain stopped play during Rwanda's innings. Revised target set at 102 runs off 30 overs.
- Malawi innings: batsmen's runs scored do not balance.

13 April 2008
Scorecard

South African Invitational XI; 198 (46.2 overs)	v	Gambia; 72 (24.3 overs)
Buntu Ndlela 58 (79); George Greywoode 4/39 (10 overs)		Johnny Gomez 16 (21); Buntu Ndlela 4/3 (6 overs)

South African Invitational XI won by 126 runs
Willowmoore Park A Field, Benoni
Umpires: Kutub Abbas (KEN) & Rafiw Valimahomed (East and Central Africa)
Player of the match: Buntu Ndlela

14 April 2008
Scorecard

Gambia; 72 (30.3 overs)	v	Ghana; 74/5 (18 overs)
Alfred Crookes 21 (50 overs); Isaac Aboagye 5/24 (10 overs)		Lawrence Ateak 21 (28); Moses Bahoum 4/36 (9 overs)

Ghana won by 5 wickets
Willowmoore Park, Benoni
Umpires: Subhash Modi (KEN) & T Molofo (RSA)
Player of the match: Isaac Aboagye

- Ghana innings: bowlers' wickets do not balance

14 April 2008
Scorecard

Malawi; 206 (48.3 overs)	v	Lesotho; 161/6 (31 overs)
Jayendarsinh Kumar 45 (57); Faizal Hanslod 2/25 (8 overs)		Irshad Patel 58 (50 overs); Altaf Panjwani 3/27 (9 overs)

Lesotho won by 4 wickets (D/L)
Willowmoore Park B Field, Benoni
Umpires: Kutub Abbas (KEN) & Rafiw Valimahomed (East and Central Africa)
Player of the match: Irshad Patel

- Rain stopped play in Lesotho's innings. Lesotho set a revised target of 161 runs from 31 overs.
- Malawi innings: batsmen's runs scored do not balance.

14 April 2008
Scorecard

Sierra Leone; 182/5 (50 overs)	v	Rwanda; 76/8 (23.2 overs)
Abu Kamara 48 (80); Srinath Vardineni 2/20 (10 overs)		Samal Subashish 40 (68); Mustapha Kallon 4/23 (7 overs)

Sierra Leone won by 74 runs (D/L)
Willowmoore Park C Field, Benoni
Umpires: Juan Bedford (RSA) & Rockie D'Mello (KEN)
Player of the match: Abu Kamara

- Rain stopped play in Rwanda's innings. Rwanda set a revised target of 151 runs from 23.2 overs.

14 April 2008
Scorecard

South African Invitational XI; 207 (44.3 overs)	v	Swaziland; 106/8 (23 overs)
T Steynburg 67 (92); Joseph Wright 3/16 (7.3 overs)		Extras (b 5, lb 3, w 41) 49; Abdul Patel 31* (57); Unknown 3/15 (4 overs)

South African Invitational XI won by 70 runs (D/L)
Willowmoore Park A Field, Benoni
Umpires: A Gawe (RSA) & David Odhiambo (KEN)
Player of the match: Unknown

- Rain stopped play in Swaziland's innings. Swaziland set a revised target of 177 runs from 23 overs.
- South African Invitation XI innings: batsmen's runs scored do not balance.

15 April 2008
Scorecard

Swaziland; 226 (47.2 overs)	v	Gambia; 135 (43.1 overs)
M Khan 32 (43); Mbye Dumbuya 3/36 (7.2 overs)		Moses Bahoum 39 (?); Ernestes Uys 3/35 (10 overs)

Swaziland by 91 runs
Willowmoore Park B Field, Benoni
Umpires: Juan Bedford (RSA) & Rockie D'Mello (KEN)
Player of the match: Ernenstes Uys

- Swaziland innings: batsmen's runs scored do not balance
- Gambia innings: bowlers' runs conceded do not balance
- Swaziland innings: bowlers' runs conceded do not balance

15 April 2008
Scorecard

Lesotho; 94 (28.5 overs)	v	Rwanda; 97/8 (25.5 overs)
Rizuan Mulla 27 (39); Mehboob Jasat 6/10 (3.5 overs)		Samal Subashish 26 (31); Irshad Patel 3/23 (10 overs)

Rwanda won by 2 wickets
Willowmoore Park C Field, Benoni
Umpires: Kutub Abbas (KEN) & Rafiq Valimahomed (East and Central Africa)
Player of the match: Mehboob Jasat

- Lesotho innings: bowlers' runs conceded do not balance

15 April 2008
Scorecard

Malawi; 82 (29.4 overs)	v	Sierra Leone; 88/4 (25.1 overs)
Extras (lb 2, w 26) 28; Altaf Panjwani 27* (62); Gabriel Anthony 5/20 (7.4 overs)		Emmanuel Kamara 36* (67); Rupesh Patel 1/13 (5.1 overs)

Sierra Leone won by 6 wickets
Willowmoore Park, Benoni
Umpires: A Gawe (RSA) & David Odhiambo (KEN)
Player of the match: Gabriel Anthony

15 April 2008
Scorecard

South African Invitational XI; 209/5 (50 overs)	v	Ghana; 110 (40.5 overs)
Ruan du Plessis 75 (92); Abdul-Karim Sumaila 2/41 (10 overs)		Extras (b 4, lb 2, w 32) 38; Bhupinder Brar 16 (43); Bongani Rafedile 3/22 (5 overs)

South African Invitational XI won by 99 runs
Willowmoore Park A Field, Benoni
Umpires: Subhash Modi (KEN) & T Molefe (RSA)
Player of the match: Ruan du Plessis

=== 5th Place Playoff ===
17 April 2008
Scorecard

Malawi; 226/9 (50 overs)	v	Gambia; 141 (43.2 overs)
Faraz Junejo 59 (83); George Greywoode 4/52 (10 overs)		Moses Bahoum 38 (63); Altaf Panjwani 4/18 (10 overs)

Malawi won by 85 runs
Willowmoore Park M Field, Benoni
Umpires: Kutubb abbas (KEN) & Rafiq Valimahomed (East and Central Africa)
Player of the match: Altaf Panjwani

- 5th place playoff semifinal

17 April 2008
Scorecard

Lesotho; 121 (39 overs)	v	South African Invitational XI; 122/3 (18.1 overs)
Extras (b 1, lb 11, w 23) 35; Rizuan Mulla 21 (22); Andre Henning 6/20 (8 overs)		Clayton Ceronio 35* (29); K Tau 1/12 (2 overs)

South African Invitational XI won by 7 wickets^{1}
Willowmoore Park A Field, Benoni
Umpires: Juan Bedford (RSA) & Rockie D'Mello (KEN)
Player of the match: Ande Henning

- 5th place playoff semifinal
^{1} Under the tournament rules, the South African Invitational XI were ineligible to participate in the 5th place playoff. Lesotho participated in the 5th place playoff, and the South African Invitational XI participated in the 7th place playoff.

18 April 2008
Scorecard

Lesotho; 105 (36.2 overs)	v	Malawi; 109/2 (23.3 overs)
Extras (b 1, lb 1, w 23, nb 1) 26; Faizal Hanslod 19 (23); Faraz Junejo 5/21 (10 overs)		Muzakkir Khan 42 (75); Motsielo Nonyane 2/19 (3.3 overs)

Malawi won by 8 wickets
Willowmoore Park A Field, Benoni
Umpires: David Odhiambo (KEN) & Rafiq Valimahomed (East and Central Africa)
Player of the match: Faraz Junejp

- 5th place playoff

18 April 2008
Scorecard

Gambia; 132 (31.4 overs)	v	South African Invitational XI; 133/4 (21.5 overs)
Extras (b 12, lb 8, w 8, nb 2) 30; George Greywoode 30 (51); T Steynburg 4/25 (7.4 overs)		S Tshabalala 34 (42); George Greywoode 2/20 (5 overs)

South African Invitational XI won by 6 wickets
Willowmoore Park C Field, Benoni
Umpires: A Gawe & T Molefe (both RSA)
Player of the match: T Steynburg

- 7th place playoff

=== Semifinals and Finals ===
17 April 2008
Scorecard

Rwanda; 23 (11.1 overs)	v	Ghana; 24/2 (6.4 overs)
Extras (lb 3, w 6) 9 Mehboob Jasat 6 (12); Julius Mbaraga 5 (6); Mohamed Jasat 2 (5); Eric Dusingizimana 1 (11); Isaac Aboagye 6/9 (5.1 overs); Abdul-Karim Sumaila 4/11 (6 overs)		Extras (lb 1, w 7) 8 James Vifah 7 (11); Francis Dake 6 (12); Lawrence Ateak 3* (8); Srinath Vardineni 1/8 (3 overs); Eric Dusabemungu 1/15 (3.4 overs)

Ghana won by 8 wickets
Willowmoore Park C Field, Benoni
Umpires: Subhash Modi (KEN) & T Molefe (RSA)
Player of the match: Isaac Aboagye

- Semifinal

17 April 2008
Scorecard

Sierra Leone; 116 (37.2 overs)	v	Swaziland; 117/6 (30 overs)
Emmanuel Kamara 28 (47); Joseph Wright 5/17 (10 overs)		Joseph Wright 48 (77); Lansana Lamin 4/19 (6 overs)

Swaziland won by 4 wickets
Willowmoore Park B Field, Benoni
Umpires: A Gawe (RSA) & David Odhiambo (KEN)
Player of the match: Joseph Wright

- Semifinal
- Swaziland innings: bowlers' runs conceded do not balance
- Sierra Leone innings: bowlers' runs conceded do not balance
- Swaziland innings: batsmen's runs scored do not balance
- Sierra Leone innings: batsmen's runs scored do not balance

18 April 2008
Scorecard

Rwanda; 114 (44.4 overs)	v	Sierra Leone; 115/2 (31.3 overs)
Extras (lb 6, w 19, nb 1) 26; Mehboob Jasat 25 (78); Ibrahim Sesay 5/22 (10 overs)		Emannuel Kamara 40 (53); Mehboob Jasat 2/29 (9 overs)

Sierra Leone won by 8 wickets
Willowmoore Park B Field, Benoni
Umpires: Kutub Abbas (KEN) & Juan Bedford (RSA)
Player of the match: Ibrahim Sesay

- 3rd Place Playoff
- Sierra Leone innings: batsmen's runs scored do not balance
- Rwanda innings: batsmen's runs scored do not balance
- Sierra Leone innings: bowlers' runs conceded do not balance
- Rwanda innings: bowlers' runs conceded do not balance

18 April 2008
Scorecard

Swaziland; 195 (45.4 overs)	v	Ghana; 199/5 (41.4 overs)
Abdul Patel 51 (59); James Vifah 3/30 (3.4 overs)		Francis Dake 73 (117); Stephen Uys 1/17 (4 overs)

Ghana won by 5 wickets
Willowmoore Park, Benoni
Umpires: Rockie D'Mello & Subhash Modi (both KEN)
Player of the match: Francis Dake

- Final

== Statistics ==
Most Runs		Most Wickets	
(Ghana) James Vifah	172	(Ghana) Isaac Aboagye	14
(Sierra Leone) Emannuel Kamara	162	Inv. XI Andre Henning	12
Inv. XI Buntu Ndlela	143	(The Gambia) Beorge Greywoode	11
(Malawi) Altaf Panjwani	138	(Eswatini) Joseph Wright	10
(Eswatini) Abdul Patel	126	(Lesotho) Motsielo Nonyane	10
