= 2008 ICC World Cricket League Africa Region Division Two =

- Administrator: African Cricket Association
- Cricket format: 50 overs per side
- Tournament format: round robin
- Host: South Africa
- Champions: Botswana
- Participants: 6
- Matches: 15
- Most runs: (Mozambique) Khuram Javid 276
- Most wickets: (Ghana) Isaac Aboagye 13

The 2008 ICC World Cricket League Africa Region Division Two was a cricket tournament in Benoni, South Africa, taking place between 4 August and 9 October 2008. It gave six African Associate and Affiliate members of the International Cricket Council experience of international one-day cricket and formed part of the global World Cricket League structure.

Botswana, the top team, was promoted to Division 1 and the 2009 Global Division 6 while Nigeria qualified for the 2009 Global Division 7.

== Teams ==
There were six teams that played in the tournament. These teams were non-test member nations of the African Cricket Association. The teams that played were:

- Botswana
- Ghana
- Mozambique
- Nigeria
- Swaziland
- Zambia

== Squads ==
Botswana	Ghana	Mozambique
Taroesh Trivedi Shahzaib Khan; Abdul Patel; Sabir Elyas; Gaolape Mokokwe; James Moses; Manan Barot; Karabo Modise; Denzil Sequeira; Tshepo Mhozya; Mosa Gaolekwe; Omar Ali	Obed Abgomadzie Matthew Bawa; Lawrence Ateak; Isaac Aboagye; Peter Ananya; Abdul-Karim Sumaila; Mark Bawa; James Vifah; Simon Ateak; Julius Mensah; Bhupinder Brar; Francis Dake; Eric Apedo; Prajul Pillai	Khuram Javid; Kaleem Shah; Imran Ismail; Iftikhar Ahmed; Chandra Puspussen; Aasif Koliya; Imtiyaz Lili; Qurban Ali; Giovanni Florentino; Mohammad Shahzad; Shoaib Younis; Musa Kazim

Nigeria	Swaziland	Zambia
Kunle Adegbola Endurance Ofem; Olajide Bejide; Temitope Olayinka; Wale Adeoye; Chimezie Onwuzulike; Dolapo Gafar; Joshua Ogunlola; Akabogu Okwudili; Uthe Ogbimi; Segun Olayinka; Olalekan Awololo; Oluseye Olympio; Thomas Haruna	Wayan Sparham Stephen Uys; Alexander Nicholas; Idris Patel; Mohamed Hansrod; Abdul Patel; U Gani Patel; Joseph Wright; Jason Wade; Haris Rashid; Ernestes Uys; Marius Uys; Shahzad Mahmood; Saifullah Habib	Majid Sarodi; Sarfuddin Bangaliwala; Ashraf Lulat; Andrew Toms; Sharif Yousuf; Imran Patel; Sarfraz Patel; Godfrey Kandela; Sameer Bagus; Isaac Mwaba; Shahid Mohamed; Sabir Havaliwala; Mohmed Mitha; Gheesa; Liuwa Liuwa

== Group stage ==
=== Points Table ===
Group Table
Team	P	W	L	T	NR	NRR	Points
Botswana	5	5	0	0	0	2.365	10
Nigeria	5	4	1	0	0	0.764	8
Zambia	5	3	2	0	0	0.448	6
Mozambique	5	2	3	0	0	0.241	4
Ghana	5	1	4	0	0	−1.377	2
Swaziland	5	0	5	0	0	−2.231	0

Team wins and gets promoted to Division 1

=== Fixtures ===
4 October 2008
scorecard

Swaziland; 69 (27.1 overs)	v	Botswana; 75/0 (9.1 overs)
Extras (b 4, lb 6, w 7) 17; Mohamed Hansrod 11 (19); James Moses 4/14 (8 overs)		Shahzaib Khan 37* (23)

Botswana won by 10 wickets
Willowmoore Park A Field, Benoni
Umpires: G Nkosi (RSA) and D Simelane (RSA)
Player of the match: James Moses

4 October 2008
scorecard

Mozambique; 186 (46.4 overs)	v	Ghana; 161 (43 overs)
Khuram Javid 72 (109); Lawrence Ateak 2/7 (3.4 overs)		Lawrence Ateak 31 (51); Imtiyaz Lili 2/15 (6 overs)

Mozambique won by 25 runs
Willowmoore Park B Field, Benoni
Umpires: Kutub Gulamabbas (Kenya) and Philip Trenwith (RSA)

- Mozambique innings: batsmen's runs scored do not balance.
- Mozambique innings: bowlers' runs conceded do not balance
- Ghana innings: bowlers' runs conceded do not balance.

4 October 2008
scorecard

Nigeria; 212/8 (49 overs)	v	Zambia; 181 (45.2 overs)
Olajide Bejide 50* (40); Sabir Havaliwala 2/7 (3.4 overs)		Sharif Yousuf 41 (54); Endurance Ofem 3/19 (9.2 overs)

Nigeria won by 31 runs
Willowmoore Park C Field, Benoni
Umpires: Wynard Louw (Namibia) and Jannie Bedford (RSA)

- Match reduced to 49 overs per side.
- Zambia innings: batsmen's runs scored do not balance.
- Zambia innings: bowlers' runs conceded do not balance.

5 October 2008
scorecard

Botswana; 223 (46.4 overs)	v	Ghana; 69 (26.1 overs)
Shahzaib Khan 63 (40); Isaac Aboagye 4/42 (10 overs)		Matthew Bawa 20 (23); Karabo Modise 3/9 (6.1 overs)

Botswana won by 154 runs
Willowmoore Park B Field, Benoni
Umpires: Philip Trenwith (RSA) and Jannie Bedford (RSA)
Player of the match: Shahzaib Khan

- Ghana innings: bowlers' runs conceded do not balance

5 October 2008
scorecard

Zambia; 232 (49.3 overs)	v	Mozambique; 228/8 (50 overs)
Andrew Toms 64 (112); Kaleem Shah 3/42 (10 overs); Chandra Puspussen 3/42 (10 overs)		Khuram Javid 72 (115); Sabir Havaliwala 2/36 (10 overs)

Zambia won by 4 runs
Willowmoore Park A Field, Benoni
Umpires: G Nkosi (RSA) and Wynard Louw (Namibia)

- Zambia innings: batsmen's runs scored do not balance.
- Zambia innings: bowlers' runs conceded do not balance.
- Mozambique innings: batsmen's runs scored do not balance.
- Mozambique innings: bowlers' runs conceded do not balance.

5 October 2008
scorecard

Nigeria; 234/7 (49 overs)	v	Swaziland; 132 (44.2 overs)
Endurance Ofem 100 (121); U Gani Patel 2/33 (9 overs)		Mohamed Hansrod 33 (82); Oluseye Olympio 4/23 (10 overs)

Nigeria won by 102 runs
Willowmoore Park C Field, Benoni
Umpires: A Gawe (RSA) and Kutub Gulamabbas (Kenya)

- Match reduced to 49 overs per side.
- Nigeria innings: batsmen's runs scored do not balance.
- Nigeria innings: bowlers' runs conceded do not balance.
- Swaziland innings: batsmen's runs scored do not balance.
- Swaziland innings: bowlers' runs conceded do not balance.

6 October 2008
scorecard

Nigeria; 205/9 (50 overs)	v	Botswana; 206/5 (44.5 overs)
Temitope Olayinka 48* (53); Taroesh Trivedi 2/11 (10 overs)		Shahzaib Khan 43 (28); Endurance Ofem 2/34 (8 overs)

Botswana won by 5 wickets
Willowmoore Park C Field, Benoni
Umpires: D Simelane (RSA) and Jannie Bedford (RSA)

- Botswana innings: batsmen's runs scored do not balance.

6 October 2008
scorecard

Zambia; 142 (36.2 overs)	v	Ghana; 40 (11.2 overs)
Imran Patel 32 (61); Bhupinder Brar 4/16 (8.2 overs)		Extras (lb 7, w 13, nb 1) 21; Mark Bawa 7* (13); Sharif Yousuf 6/11 (5.2 overs)

Zambia won by 102 runs
Willowmoore Park B Field, Benoni
Umpires: Kutum Gulumabbas (KEN) and Wynard Louw (NAM)

- Zambia innings: batsmen's runs scored do not balance.
- Ghana innings: bowlers' runs conceded do not balance.

6 October 2008
scorecard

Mozambique; 243/7 (50 overs)	v	Swaziland; 144 (40 overs)
Khuram Javid 68 (103); U Gani Patel 4/47 (10 overs)		Alexander Nicholas 41 (77); Chandra Puspussen 3/9 (4 overs)

Mozambique won by 102 runs
Willowmoore Park A Field, Benoni
Umpires: G Nkosi (RSA) and Philip Trenwith (RSA)
Player of the match: Khuram Javid

- Mozambique innings: batsmen's runs scored do not balance.
- Swaziland innings: batsmen's runs scored do not balance.
- Swaziland innings: bowlers' runs conceded do not balance.

8 October 2008
scorecard

Zambia; 131 (27.5 overs)	v	Botswana; 134/6 (23 overs)
Sarfraz Patel 39 (46); Mosa Gaolekwe 4/22 (5.5 overs)		Shahzaib Khan 52 (50); Mohmed Mitha 4/33 (7 overs)

Botswana won by 4 wickets
Willowmoore Park B Field, Benoni
Umpires: G Nkosi (RSA) and Kutub Gulamabbas (KEN)
Player of the match: Shahzaib Khan

- Zambia innings: batsmen's runs scored do not balance.
- Botswana innings: batsmen's runs scored do not balance.

8 October 2008
scorecard

Swaziland; 209/9 (46 overs)	v	Ghana; 210/5 (44.5 overs)
Abdul Patel 40 (48); Obed Abgomadzie 2/20 (8 overs)		Obed Abgomadzie 89 (104); U Gani Patel 2/26 (9.5 overs)

Ghana won by 5 wickets
Willowmoore Park C Field, Benoni
Umpires: Jannie Bedford (RSA) and D Simelane (RSA)
Player of the match: Shahzaib Khan

- Match reduced to 46 overs per side.
- Swaziland innings: batsmen's runs scored do not balance.
- Swaziland innings: bowlers' runs conceded do not balance.
- Ghana innings: batsmen's runs scored do not balance.
- Ghana innings: bowlers' runs conceded do not balance.

8 October 2008
scorecard

Nigeria; 105 (40.3 overs)	v	Mozambique; 91 (26.1 overs)
Extras (b 2, w 21) 23; Dolapo Gafar 19 (34); Mohammad Shahzad 4/26 (10 overs)		Khuram Javid 25 (39); Joshua Ogunlola 5/15 (8 overs)

Nigeria won by 14 runs
Willowmoore Park A Field, Benoni
Umpires: Wynard Louw (NAM) and Philip Trenwith (RSA)
Player of the match: Shahzaib Khan

9 October 2008
scorecard

Mozambique; 174 (44.5 overs)	v	Botswana; 175/4 (37 overs)
Iftikhar Ahmed 46 (80); Tshepo Mhozya 5/32 (8 overs)		Abdul Patel 71* (96); Aasif Koliya 2/33 (9 overs)

Botswana won by 6 wickets
Willowmoore Park A Field, Benoni
Umpires: Wynard Louw (NAM) and Kutub Gulamabbas (KEN)
Player of the match: Shahzaib Khan

- Mozambique innings: batsmen's runs scored do not balance.
- Mozambique innings: bowlers' runs conceded do not balance.
- Botswana innings: bowlers' runs conceded do not balance.

9 October 2008
scorecard

Nigeria; 241/6 (50 overs)	v	Ghana; 171/7 (47 overs)
Endurance Ofem 53 (64); Isaac Aboagye 2/32 (10 overs)		Lawrence Ateak 43 (53); Endurance Ofem 3/31 (9 overs)

Nigeria won by 70 runs
Willowmoore Park C Field, Benoni
Umpires: D Simelane (RSA) and Philip Trenwith (RSA)
Player of the match: Shahzaib Khan

- Ghana were fined 3 overs for a slow over rate.
- Nigeria innings: bowlers' runs conceded do not balance.
- Nigeria innings: bowlers' overs bowled do not balance.
- Ghana innings: batsmen's runs scored do not balance.
- Ghana innings: bowlers' runs conceded do not balance.

9 October 2008
scorecard

Zambia; 251/5 (50 overs)	v	Swaziland; 122 (35.2 overs)
Majid Sarodi 85* (99); Haris Rashid 2/58 (10 overs)		Ernestes Uys 34 (69); Mohmed Mitha 4/58 (9.2 overs)

Zambia won by 129 runs
Willowmoore Park B Field, Benoni
Umpires: Jannie Bedford (RSA) and G Nkosi (RSA)

- Zambia innings: batsmen's runs scored do not balance.
- Zambia innings: bowlers' runs conceded do not balance.
- Swaziland innings: batsmen's runs scored do not balance.
- Swaziland innings: bowlers' runs conceded do not balance.

== Statistics ==
Most Runs		Most Wickets	
(Mozambique) Khuram Javid	276	(Ghana) Isaac Aboagye	13
(Nigeria) Endurance Ofem	209	(Botswana) Mosa Gaolekwe	10
(Botswana) Shahzaib Khan	208	(Mozambique) Chandra Puspussen	10
(Nigeria) Kunle Adegbola	181	(Zambia) Sharif Yousuf	10
(Nigeria) Olajide Bejide	147	(Zambia) Sabir Havaliwala	10
