= 2010 ICC World Cricket League Africa Region Division Two =

- Administrator(s): African Cricket Association
- Cricket format: 50 overs per side
- Tournament format(s): round robin
- Host(s): South Africa
- Champions: Zambia
- Participants: 6
- Matches: 15

The 2010 ICC World Cricket League Africa Region Division Two was a cricket tournament held in Benoni, Gauteng, South Africa, took place between 23 April and 29 April 2010. It gave six African Associate and Affiliate members of the International Cricket Council experience of international one-day cricket and formed part of the global World Cricket League structure.

Zambia was promoted to 2010 ICC World Cricket League Division Eight.

== Teams ==
There are six teams participating in the tournament. These teams are non-test member nations of the African Cricket Association. The teams are:

- Ghana
- Malawi
- Mozambique
- Sierra Leone
- Swaziland
- Zambia

== Squads ==
Ghana	Malawi	Mozambique
Isaac K.O. Aboagye; Obed Harvey Agbomodazie; Peter Amanya (captain); Moses Anafie; Lawrence Ateak; Simon Ateak; Samson K.A. Awiah; Kofi Baganena; Mark Bawa; Matthew Bawa; Julius Horlali Mensah; Rufus Kweku Ntiamoah; Abdul Karim Sumaila; James Kwaku Vifah	Unknown	Unknown

Sierra Leone	Swaziland	Zambia
Brima Ansumana; Solomon Fatoma; Abass Gbla; Ibrahim Kabia; Mustapha Kallon; Abubakarr Kamara; Alie John Kamara; Ibrahim Kamara; George Kpundeh; Lansana Lamin (captain); Ibrahim Mansaray; Edward Marah; Emmanuel Pessima; Julius Quee	Unknown	Gladson Kandela; Godfrey Kandela; Ashraf Lulat; Mohamed Mitha; Meeth Naik; Allan Nsensha; Tapson Nyirongo; Abid Patel; Imran Suleman Patel; Sarfraz Patel; Markus Pieterse; Sharif Yousuf; Sarfarajhusen Sopariya; Andrew Toms

== Group stage ==
=== Points Table ===
Group Table
Team	P	W	L	T	NR	NRR	Points
Zambia	6	5	0	0	1	???	11
Ghana	6	4	1	0	1	???	9
Swaziland	6	4	1	0	1	???	9
Sierra Leone	6	1	4	0	1	???	3
Mozambique	6	1	4	0	1	???	3
Malawi	6	0	5	0	1	???	1

Team wins and gets promoted to Division 1

=== Fixtures ===
24 April 2010
(scorecard)

Zambia	v	Sierra Leone

Match abandoned without a ball bowled
Willowmoore Park†, Benoni, South Africa

- Match abandoned due to rain. Match not rescheduled. Both teams receive 1 point for no result.
- †Exact field in Willowmoore Park unknown

24 April 2010
(scorecard)

Malawi	v	Mozambique

Match abandoned without a ball bowled
Willowmoore Park†, Benoni, South Africa

- Match abandoned due to rain. Match not rescheduled. Both teams receive 1 point for no result.
- †Exact field in Willowmoore Park unknown

24 April 2010
(scorecard)

Swaziland	v	Ghana

Match abandoned without a ball bowled
Willowmoore Park†, Benoni, South Africa

- Match abandoned due to rain. Match not rescheduled. Both teams receive 1 point for no result.
- †Exact field in Willowmoore Park unknown

25 April 2010
(scorecard)

Ghana; 183 all out (47.2 overs)	v	Mozambique; 151 all out (47.4 overs)
Peter Ananya 48* (71); Muhammad Nazir 3/43 (9.2 overs)		Syed Kaleem Shah 69 (141); Kofi Bagabena 3/37 (10 overs)

Ghana won by 32 runs
Willowmoore Park Main Oval, Benoni, South Africa
Umpires: Unknown
Player of the match: Syed Kaleem Shah (Mozambique)

- Ghana won the toss and elected to bat first

25 April 2010
(scorecard)

Zambia	v	Malawi

Match abandoned without a ball bowled
Willowmoore Park†, Benoni, South Africa

- Match abandoned due to rain. Match rescheduled for 27 April.
- †Exact field in Willowmoore Park unknown

25 April 2010
(scorecard)

Sierra Leone	v	Swaziland

Match abandoned without a ball bowled
Willowmoore Park†, Benoni, South Africa

- Match abandoned due to rain. Match rescheduled for 27 April.
- †Exact field in Willowmoore Park unknown

26 April 2010
(scorecard)

Swaziland; 78 all out (36.1 overs)	v	Zambia; 79/2 (10.5 overs)
Estean Sauterman 29 (61); Mohammed Mitha 4/10 (7.1 overs)		Ashraf Lulat 28 (14); Stephen Uys 1/13 (2 overs)

Zambia won by 8 wickets
Willowmoore Park Main Oval, Benoni, South Africa
Umpires: S Modi & K Saberhagen

- Zambia won the toss and elected to field first

26 April 2010
(scorecard)

Malawi; 188 all out (49.3 overs)	v	Ghana; 189/3 (40.3 overs)
Musaeed Qureshi 52; Kofi Bagabena 3/31 (8.3 overs)		James Kwaku Vifah 76*; Arjun Kalaria 2/33 (10 overs) (99)

Ghana won by 7 wickets
Willowmoore Park Main Oval, Benoni, South Africa
Umpires: Unknown

- Ghana won the toss and elected to bowl first.

26 April 2010
(scorecard)

Mozambique; 131 all out (43.4 overs)	v	Sierra Leone; 88 all out (46 overs)
Extras (2 b, 3 lb, 1 nb, 24 w) 30; Mohammed Shahzad 26; Abubakarr Kamara 3/23 (10 overs)		Abubakarr Kamara 34 (110); Christiaan Louw 5/25 (9 overs)

Mozambique won by 43 runs
Willowmoore Park C, Benoni, South Africa
Umpires: P Jele

- Sierra Leone won the toss and elected to bowl first.

27 April 2010
(scorecard)

Zambia; 189 all out (45.5 overs)	v	Malawi; 75 all out (34 overs)
Imran Suleman Patel 55* (69); Muzakir Khan 4/31 (9 overs)		Muzakir Khan 33 (85); Godfrey Kandela 3/17 (9 overs)

Zambia won by 114 runs
Willowmoore Park A, Benoni, South Africa
Umpires: P Jele and D Smith

- Malawi won the toss and elected to bowl first.
- Replay from 25 April

27 April 2010
(scorecard)

Sierra Leone; 134 all out (30 overs)	v	Swaziland; 84/3 (20 overs)
		Naeem Gull 42*; Kamara Abubakarr 2/27 (8 overs)

Swaziland won by 30 runs (D/L)
Willowmoore Park†, Benoni, South Africa
Umpires: D Smith and K Sieberhagen

- Swaziland won the toss and elected to bowl first.
- Replay from 25 April. Match shortened due to rain; Duckworth-Lewis revised target to win: 54 runs in 20 overs for Swaziland.
- †Exact field in Willowmoore Park unknown

28 April 2010
(scorecard)

Zambia; 187/7 (50 overs)	v	Ghana; 193/0 (39.4 overs)
Godfrey Kandela 41 (80); Kofi Bagabena 3/22 (10 overs)		Obed Harvey 35 (63); Godfrey Kandela 4/20 (9.4 overs)

Zambia won by 62 runs
Willowmoore Park C, Benoni, South Africa
Umpires: P Jele and K Gulamabbas

- Zambia won the toss and elected to bat first.

28 April 2010
(scorecard)

Mozambique; 0/9 all out (40 overs)	v	Swaziland; 130/6 (42.2 overs)
Syed Kaleem Shah 45 (101); Mangaliso Mhlabane 3/17 (4 overs)		Haris Rashid 25* (64); Mohammed Shahzad 2/20 (10 overs)

Swaziland won by 4 wickets
Willowmoore Park A, Benoni, South Africa
Umpires: Unknown

- Swaziland won the toss and elected to bowl first.

28 April 2010
(scorecard)

Malawi; 89 all out (39.5 overs)	v	Sierra Leone; 95/5 (25.5 overs)
Arjun Kalaria 30 (76); Abubakarr Kamara 4/9 (10 overs)		Lansana Lamin 26* (13); Ibrahim Kabia 26 (53); Arjun Kalaria 3/23 (9 overs)

Sierra Leone won by 5 wickets
Willowmoore Park Main Oval, Benoni, South Africa
Umpires: S Modi and DJ Smith

- Malawi won the toss and elected to bat first.

29 April 2010
(scorecard

Zambia; 214/9 (50.0 overs)	v	Mozambique; 194 all out (49.0 overs)
Sarfraz Patel 69 (84); Cornelius Zeeman 3/34 (10 overs)		Muhammad Nazir 77 (67); Godfrey Kandela 2/65 (10 overs)

Zambia won by 20 runs
Willowmoore Park Main Oval, Benoni, South Africa
Umpires: J Bedford & P Jele

- Zambia won the toss and elected to bat first.

29 April 2010
(scorecard

Ghana; 194 all out (48.5 overs)	v	Sierra Leone; 129 all out (39.3 overs)
Julius Horlali Mensah 39 (54); Ibrahim Kamara 3/24 (4.5 overs)		Lansana Lamin 45 (57); Lawrence Ateak 4/31 (7 overs)

Ghana won by 65 runs
Willowmoore Park A Field, Benoni, South Africa
Umpires: Unknown

- Ghana won the toss and elected to bat first.

29 April 2010
(scorecard

Malawi; 69 all out (19.2 overs)	v	Swaziland; 70/1 (8.1 overs)
Extras (2 lb, 15 w) 17; Arjun Kalaria 13 (30); Estean Sauerman 8/31 (9.2 overs)		Sabbir Kasam 24* (25); Arjun Kalaria 1/13 (2.1 overs)

Swaziland won by 9 wickets
Willowmoore Park C, Benoni, South Africa
Umpires: Unknown

- Swaziland won the toss and elected to bowl first.
