= Henry Savory =

English cricketer

Personal information
- Full name: Henry Jarvis Savory
- Born: 4 March 1914; Chipping Sodbury, Gloucestershire, England
- Died: 4 January 2008 (aged 93)
- Batting: Right-handed
- Bowling: Right-arm medium
- Role: Batsman

Domestic team information
- Years: Team
- 1937: Gloucestershire
- Only FC: 3 July 1937 Gloucestershire v New Zealanders
- Source: CricketArchive, 6 April 2008

Henry Jarvis Savory (4 March 1914 – 4 January 2008) was an English cricketer who played internationally for Nigeria. A right-handed batsman and right-arm medium pace bowler, he played one first-class match for Gloucestershire County Cricket Club in 1937, against New Zealand.

Following his only first-class appearance, he played three matches for Gloucestershire Second XI in 1939. After World War II, he played two matches for Nigeria against Gold Coast in Lagos in 1947 and 1949.
