= List of Zambia Twenty20 International cricketers =

This is a list of Zambian Twenty20 International cricketers.

In April 2018, the ICC decided to grant full Twenty20 International (T20I) status to all its members. Therefore, all Twenty20 matches played between Zambia and other ICC members after 1 January 2019 will be eligible for T20I status.

This list includes all players who have played in at least one T20I match. It is initially arranged in the order in which each player won his first Twenty20 cap. Where more than one player will win his first Twenty20 cap in the same match, those players will be listed alphabetically by surname (according to the name format used by Cricinfo).

Zambia played their first match with T20I status on 4 December 2025 against Nigeria during the 2025 West Africa Trophy.

== Key ==
General

- ‡ – Captain
- † – Wicket-keeper
- First – Year of debut
- Last – Year of latest game
- Mat – Number of matches played

Batting

- Runs – Runs scored in career
- HS – Highest score
- Avg – Runs scored per dismissal
- * – Batsman remained not out
- 50 – Half-centuries scored
- 100 – Centuries scored

Bowling

- Balls – Balls bowled in career
- Wkt – Wickets taken in career
- BBI – Best bowling in an innings
- Ave – Average runs per wicket

Fielding

- Ca – Catches taken
- St – Stumpings affected

== Players ==
Statistics are correct as of 25 October 2026.

| Cap | Name | First | Last | Mat | Batting | | | | | Bowling | | | | Fielding | | Ref(s) |
| Cap | Name | First | Last | Mat | Runs | HS | Avg | 50 | 100 | Balls | Wkt | BBI | Ave | Ca | St | Ref(s) |
|---|---|---|---|---|---|---|---|---|---|---|---|---|---|---|---|---|
| 1 | Aslam Bera | 2025 | 2025 | 9 | 2 | 1 | 0.50 | 0 | 0 | 167 | 6 | 2/23 | 33.66 | 2 | 0 | |
| 2 | Ayaz Dadabhai | 2025 | 2026 | 21 | 176 | 21 | 11.00 | 0 | 0 | 366 | 23 | 4/15 | 15.26 | 10 | 0 | |
| 3 | Joyeb Chand | 2025 | 2026 | 18 | 370 | 47 | 26.42 | 0 | 0 | 198 | 10 | 4/22 | 23.40 | 4 | 0 | |
| 4 | Mohammad Bhaidu† | 2025 | 2025 | 7 | 50 | 17 | 8.33 | 0 | 0 | – | – | – | – | 2 | 0 | |
| 5 | Mohmedazim Abbasbhai | 2025 | 2025 | 7 | 72 | 26 | 12.00 | 0 | 0 | – | – | – | – | 1 | 0 | |
| 6 | Muhammad Asim | 2025 | 2026 | 12 | 291 | 60 | 24.25 | 2 | 0 | 156 | 8 | 3/11 | 23.25 | 1 | 0 | |
| 7 | Lawrence Mutale | 2025 | 2025 | 3 | 3 | 2* | 3.00 | 0 | 0 | – | – | – | – | 1 | 0 | |
| 8 | Jakir Patel | 2025 | 2026 | 20 | 360 | 63 | 18.94 | 1 | 0 | – | – | – | – | 6 | 0 | |
| 9 | Javid Patel‡ | 2025 | 2026 | 21 | 110 | 26* | 7.33 | 0 | 0 | 429 | 21 | 4/11 | 22.04 | 3 | 0 | |
| 10 | Shahnawaz Patel | 2025 | 2025 | 8 | 82 | 29 | 13.66 | 0 | 0 | – | – | – | – | 5 | 0 | |
| 11 | Soyeb Pendi | 2025 | 2026 | 16 | 54 | 17* | 10.80 | 0 | 0 | 315 | 19 | 3/17 | 17.57 | 7 | 0 | |
| 12 | Musonda Yambayamba† | 2025 | 2026 | 12 | 7 | 3* | 3.50 | 0 | 0 | – | – | – | – | 7 | 3 | |
| 13 | Salman Patel | 2025 | 2025 | 7 | 32 | 24* | 8.00 | 0 | 0 | 43 | 2 | 1/23 | 37.00 | 2 | 0 | |
| 14 | Benson Chama | 2025 | 2025 | 2 | 0 | 0 | 0.00 | 0 | 0 | – | – | – | – | 0 | 0 | |
| 15 | Irfan Saleh | 2026 | 2026 | 5 | 39 | 17 | 9.75 | 0 | 0 | – | – | – | – | 0 | 0 | |
| 16 | Ismail Kara | 2026 | 2026 | 11 | 304 | 82 | 27.63 | 3 | 0 | 229 | 13 | 2/11 | 20.15 | 6 | 0 | |
| 17 | Robert Lungu | 2026 | 2026 | 11 | 76 | 28 | 8.44 | 0 | 0 | 180 | 10 | 3/18 | 17.60 | 0 | 0 | |
| 18 | Shadreck Malama† | 2026 | 2026 | 9 | 125 | 49 | 15.62 | 0 | 0 | – | – | – | – | 7 | 1 | |
| 19 | Vasmiakram Chand | 2026 | 2026 | 10 | 139 | 40 | 17.37 | 0 | 0 | – | – | – | – | 0 | 0 | |
| 20 | Zakir Husain Patel | 2026 | 2026 | 9 | 76 | 30 | 12.66 | 0 | 0 | 96 | 3 | 2/20 | 41.66 | 2 | 0 | |
| 21 | Joshep Zulu | 2026 | 2026 | 7 | 14 | 11 | 7.00 | 0 | 0 | 105 | 2 | 2/19 | 27.40 | 0 | 0 | |
| 22 | Zahirbhai Patel | 2026 | 2026 | 4 | 16 | 10 | 5.33 | 0 | 0 | 54 | 6 | 4/4 | 8.83 | 4 | 0 | |
| 23 | Chimya Chilekwa | 2026 | 2026 | 2 | – | – | – | 0 | 0 | 12 | 0 | – | – | 2 | 0 | |
