= Ghana women's national under-19 cricket team =

Under-19 cricket team

Ghana Women's Under-19 cricket team
- Association: Ghana Cricket Association

International Cricket Council
- ICC region: Africa

The Ghana women's under-19 cricket team represents Ghana in international under-19 women's cricket. The team is administered by the Ghana Cricket Association.

The side played for the first time in the Africa Qualifier for the 2025 Under-19 Women's T20 World Cup.
