= West Africa Cricket Council =

The West Africa Cricket Council was a regional body which organised cricket teams from Gambia, Ghana, Nigeria, and Sierra Leone.

It ceased to exist in 1997 with the formation of the African Cricket Association, which now oversees all cricket administration across the African continent.

The West African Cricket Council organised a unified team called the West African Cricket Team. They never managed to qualify for the ICC Cricket World Cup, although they competed in the ICC Trophy on three occasions.

The team was an associate member of the ICC from 1976 until 2003, when the member states of the West African Cricket Council came under the administration of the newly formed African Cricket Association.

== Members ==
- Gambia
- Ghana
- Nigeria
- Sierra Leone
