= List of Gambia Twenty20 International cricketers =

This is a list of Gambia Twenty20 International cricketers.

In April 2018, the ICC decided to grant full Twenty20 International (T20I) status to all its members. Therefore, all Twenty20 matches played between Gambia and other ICC members after 1 January 2019 have the T20I status.

This list comprises all members of the Gambia cricket team who have played at least one T20I match. It is initially arranged in the order in which each player won his first Twenty20 cap. Where more than one player won his first Twenty20 cap in the same match, their surnames are listed alphabetically (according to the name format used by Cricinfo).

Gambia played their first match with T20I status on 1 December 2022 against Eswatini during the 2022–23 ICC Men's T20 World Cup Africa Qualifier.

== Key ==
General

- ‡ – Captain
- † – Wicket-keeper
- First – Year of debut
- Last – Year of latest game
- Mat – Number of matches played

Batting

- Runs – Runs scored in career
- HS – Highest score
- Avg – Runs scored per dismissal
- * – Batsman remained not out
- 50 – Half-centuries scored

Bowling

- Balls – Balls bowled in career
- Wkt – Wickets taken in career
- BBI – Best bowling in an innings
- Ave – Average runs per wicket

Fielding

- Ca – Catches taken
- St – Stumpings affected

== List of players ==
Statistics are correct as of 25 October 2026.

Gambia T20I cricketers
Cap	Name	First	Last	Mat	Batting				Bowling				Fielding		Ref(s)
Cap	Name	First	Last	Mat	Runs	HS	Avg	50	Balls	Wkt	BBI	Ave	Ca	St	Ref(s)
1	Ousman Bah†	2022	2026	15	40	8*	5.00	0	5	0	–	–	5	0	
2	Modou Bojang	2022	2026	11	42	11	3.81	0	155	4	1/2	41.50	2	0	
3	Frank Campbell	2022	2026	15	145	25	9.66	0	18	0	–	–	0	0	
4	Peter Campbell‡	2022	2022	5	15	10	5.00	0	–	–	–	–	0	0	
5	Aniru Conteh	2022	2026	14	66	16	5.07	0	207	14	4/10	17.50	2	0	
6	Andre Jarju	2022	2026	16	133	39	11.08	0	226	11	3/40	33.36	5	0	
7	Musa Jobarteh	2022	2026	17	53	20	4.41	0	277	10	3/27	41.20	6	0	
8	Muhammed Manga†	2022	2026	16	202	59*	13.46	1	8	0	–	–	1	0	
9	Gabriel Riley	2022	2024	3	5	3	1.66	0	–	–	–	–	0	0	
10	Mustapha Suwareh	2022	2026	15	52	15	3.46	0	18	1	1/6	52.00	2	0	
11	Ismaila Tamba‡	2022	2024	12	136	43	13.60	0	72	4	2/20	29.00	3	0	
12	Abubacarr Kuyateh‡	2022	2026	16	120	33	7.50	0	294	11	3/19	33.54	7	0	
13	Fallou Thorpe	2022	2026	3	0	0*	0.00	0	12	0	–	–	0	0	
14	Ousman Touray	2022	2022	3	6	6	3.00	0	18	1	1/31	46.00	1	0	
15	David Demba	2023	2026	7	93	45*	18.60	0	76	3	1/12	37.00	0	0	
16	Asim Ashraf	2024	2024	3	42	19	14.00	0	60	0	–	–	0	0	
17	Basiru Jaye	2024	2024	2	6	6	6.00	0	–	–	–	–	0	0	
18	Arjunsingh Rajpurohit	2024	2024	3	26	22	8.66	0	65	3	1/25	35.33	2	0	
19	Shan Siddiqui	2024	2024	2	4	4	4.00	0	12	0	–	–	0	0	
20	Baboucarr Jaye	2024	2024	1	–	–	–	–	–	–	–	–	0	0	
21	Pa Assan Faye	2026	2026	4	9	6	2.25	0	18	0	–	–	1	0	
22	Alieu Gibba	2026	2026	1	–	–	–	–	–	–	–	–	0	0	
23	Malang Touray	2026	2026	3	13	6*	13.00	0	–	–	–	–	0	0	
