= West Africa cricket team =

International sports team

West Africa
International Cricket Council
- ICC status: Former member (1976 to 2003)
- ICC region: Africa

International cricket
- First international: 16 June 1982 v Bangladesh at West Bromwich, England

One Day Internationals
- World Cup Qualifier appearances: 3 (withdrew in 2001) (first in 1982)
- Best result: First round, 1982
- As of 1 August 2007

The West African cricket team was a team representing the countries of Gambia, Ghana, Nigeria and Sierra Leone in international cricket whilst they were an associate member of the International Cricket Council (ICC) between 1976 and 2003. They played in the ICC Trophy on three occasions, in 1982, 1994 and 1997, withdrawing shortly before the start of the 2001 tournament. The team was broken up into its constituent parts in 2003, with Nigeria becoming an associate member of the ICC, the other three affiliates.

== Tournament history ==
=== ICC Trophy ===
- 1979: Did not participate
- 1982: First round
- 1986: Did not participate
- 1990: Did not participate
- 1994: 17th place
- 1997: 18th place
- 2001: Withdrew

== Related teams ==
A West Africa under-19 team contested the 2001 ICC Africa Under-19 Championship in Uganda, which was the inaugural edition of the ICC Africa Under-19 Championships. The squad included Nigerians, Ghanaians, and Gambians, but no Sierra Leoneans. West Africa lost their opening match against Uganda by 278 runs, but rebounded to narrowly win their next fixture against Namibia by 10 runs. This was followed by a 178-run loss to Kenya and a five-wicket loss to East and Central Africa.

== See also ==
- West Africa Cricket Council
- Gambia national cricket team
- Ghana national cricket team
- Nigeria national cricket team
- Sierra Leone national cricket team
