= Ghana Cricket Association =

Governing body of cricket in Ghana

- Sport: Cricket
- Jurisdiction: National
- Abbreviation: GCA
- Affiliation: International Cricket Council (ICC)
- (Ghana)

Ghana Cricket Association is the official governing body of the sport of cricket in Ghana. Its headquarters is in the national capital Accra. Ghana Cricket Association is Ghana's representative at the International Cricket Council and is an associate member and has been a member of that body since 2002. It is also a member of the African Cricket Association.
