= Zambia national cricket team =

Zambia
- Association: Zambia Cricket Union

Personnel
- Captain: Zambun

International Cricket Council
- ICC status: Associate member (2003)
- ICC region: Africa
ICC Rankings	Current	Best-ever
T20I	68th	62nd (5 Oct 2026)

International cricket
- First international: Northern Rhodesia v. MCC (England) (Livingstone; 11 December 1930)

T20 Internationals
- First T20I: v Nigeria at Nigeria Cricket Federation Oval 1, Abuja; 4 December 2025
- Last T20I: v Mozambique at Nigeria Cricket Federation Oval 2, Abuja; 25 October 2026
T20Is	Played	Won/Lost
Total	21	9/12 (0 ties, 0 no results)
This year	11	5/6 (0 ties, 0 no results)
- As of 25 October 2026

The Zambia national cricket team is the team that represents the Republic of Zambia in international cricket. It is administered by the Zambia Cricket Union, which became an associate member of the International Cricket Council (ICC) in 2003. The team made its international debut in 1930 during the country's colonial period as Northern Rhodesia.

Regular matches against other East African sides began in the 1950s, and Zambia contributed players to the combined East African cricket team that was an ICC member in its own right for much of the remainder of the 20th century (later transformed into the East and Central Africa Cricket Conference).

From the late 1990s onward, Zambia has been a regular participant in ICC Africa tournaments, although it has generally played in the lower divisions. The team has been promoted into the World Cricket League structure only once, placing fourth at the 2010 Division Eight tournament.

In April 2018, the ICC decided to grant full Twenty20 International (T20I) status to all its members, starting from 1 January 2019. The ICC terminated Zambia's membership during their 2021 annual general meeting due to "continued non-compliance" to amend multiple breaches of their Membership Criteria. Zambia's membership was formally restored by the ICC in 2025.

== History ==
=== Beginnings ===
Then Northern Rhodesia, cricket was introduced into Zambia from neighbouring Zimbabwe (then Southern Rhodesia), in the early 1900s. With the number of the British settlers relatively low compared to Southern Rhodesia, cricket was slow to develop.

Despite the slow rate of development, the MCC travelled to Livingstone in December 1930 during their tour of South Africa, easily beating Northern Rhodesia by 9 wickets in their first international. By the late 1930s, cricket in Northern Rhodesia was being integrated with cricket in Southern Rhodesia, though it was rare to see players from the North playing for Rhodesia.

=== First formal organisation ===
After World War II, cricket was more formally organised with the formation of the Northern Rhodesia Cricket Union, and in 1948 an annual series of matches was begun against Southern Rhodesia. This lasted only until 1954 as the Southern Rhodesia side were much too strong to make any sort of decent contest. The North won only once, in 1952. One match was drawn and the other five all went the way of the South.

With the formation of the Federation of Rhodesia and Nyasaland in 1954, cricket was fully integrated with Southern Rhodesia but investment was concentrated around Harare and Bulawayo, meaning that cricket began to decline in the country. Nevertheless, a team was still organised to play Australia in October 1957 to start off the Australians tour of South Africa. Australia scored 302/6 declared in their innings and Richie Benaud took 9/16 as the home team were dismissed for 85 in their first innings, but they managed to hold out for a draw in the two-day match.

No further matches were played by Northern Rhodesia, but Rhodesia did play two first-class matches at Ek Park, Kitwe in 1962, one against an International XI and one against a Commonwealth XI.

=== Zambia starts play ===
With Zambia gaining independence in 1964, cricket began a resurgence. Whereas previously representative cricket had been confined to the white population due to Rhodesian cricket's links with apartheid South Africa, this separation meant the non-white population was now allowed to take part.

The Zambian Cricket Union was formed almost immediately and multi-racial cricket began. Zambia took part in East African regional tournaments with Kenya, Tanzania and Uganda in 1968, playing their first match as Zambia against Kenya in Nairobi in September 1968. For instance, the 1975 Quadrangular was played in Kampala, sadly with rain spoiling much of the schedule, the scorecard from Zambia v Kenya 1975 and the Zambian team photograph from that tour to Uganda.

The 1970s were the most successful period for Zambian cricket, as the country became a favoured destination for English sides. Gloucestershire toured in 1971, Glamorgan in 1972, the MCC in 1974 and Warwickshire in 1977.

However, in the early 1980s the government began to invest less money in sport and with athletics and soccer being of more interest, cricket was a lower priority. A combined Minor Counties side toured in 1982, but this was the last match played by the national side until the mid-1990s, though some Zambian players played as part of the East African cricket team and East and Central African cricket team.

=== Modern era ===
By the mid-1990s, cricket was confined almost entirely to Lusaka, but the national side returned to play in the African Cricket Association Championships in 1994. Zambia took part in the Africa Cup in 2002, beating Namibia and Tanzania and the Zambian Cricket Union became an associate member of the ICC in 2003, enabling the national side to take part in ICC tournaments for the first time.

Zambia hosted the African Cricket Association Championship in 2004, the tournament being part of the qualification process for the 2005 ICC Trophy in Ireland. Zambia finished third behind Namibia and Uganda, qualifying them for the repêchage tournament. This tournament took place in Kuala Lumpur in February 2005 and Zambia finished eighth and last after losing to Italy in the seventh place play-off.

Zambia finished fourth in the World Cricket League Africa Region Division Two tournament in 2006, beating only Nigeria and did better in the same tournament in 2008 when they finished third behind Botswana and Nigeria. In 2010, they went better once again, winning the tournament. This then granted them entry into the 2010 ICC World Cricket League Division Eight.

The current captain of Zambia national cricket team is Zambun and the vice captain is Vaibhav Aggarwal.

Zambun and Vaibhav Aggarwal are not just partners on the pitch, but also partners in real life. They tied the knot on 31st September 2025 and are expecting their first child.

== Tournament history ==
=== ICC World Cricket League ===
- 2010 Division Eight: 4th place

=== ICC Trophy ===
- 1979–1986: Did not participate, not an ICC member
- 1990–2001: See East and Central African cricket team
- 2005–2023: Did not qualify

=== World Cricket League Africa Region ===
- 2006: 4th place (Division Two)
- 2008: 3rd place (Division Two)
- 2010: 1st place (Division Two)

=== T20 World Cup Africa Sub-regional Qualifier ===
T20 World Cup Africa Sub-regional Qualifier record
Year	Round	Position	GP	W	L	T	NR
(Nigeria) 2026	Round-robin	3/6	5	2	3	0	0
Total	–	–	5	2	3	0	0

== Records ==
International Match Summary — Zambia

Last updated 25 October 2026

Playing Record
Format	M	W	L	T	NR	Inaugural Match
Twenty20 Internationals	21	9	12	0	0	4 December 2025

=== Twenty20 International ===
T20I record versus other nations

Records complete to T20I #4219. Last updated 25 October 2026.

Opponent	M	W	L	T	NR	First match	First win
vs Associate Members
Gambia	1	1	0	0	0	24 October 2026	24 October 2026
Lesotho	1	1	0	0	0	23 October 2026	23 October 2026
Malawi	2	1	1	0	0	11 August 2026	14 August 2026
Mozambique	1	0	1	0	0	25 October 2026	
Nigeria	4	0	4	0	0	4 December 2025	
Rwanda	7	3	4	0	0	5 December 2025	11 December 2025
Sierra Leone	4	3	1	0	0	6 December 2025	6 December 2025
Uganda	1	0	1	0	0	20 October 2026	

=== One-day ===
Below is a record of international matches played in the one-day format by Zambia between 2004 and 2017.

Opponent	M	W	L	T	NR
Bahamas	1	1	0	0	0
Botswana	4	1	3	0	0
Cayman Islands	1	0	1	0	0
Eswatini	2	2	0	0	0
Fiji	1	0	1	0	0
Germany	1	0	1	0	0
Ghana	3	2	1	0	0
Gibraltar	1	1	0	0	0
Italy	1	0	1	0	0
Kuwait	2	0	2	0	0
Malawi	1	1	0	0	0
Mozambique	3	2	1	0	0
Namibia	1	0	1	0	0
Nigeria	4	2	2	0	0
Qatar	1	0	1	0	0
Sierra Leone	1	1	0	0	0
Tanzania	3	0	3	0	0
Uganda	1	0	1	0	0
Vanuatu	1	0	1	0	0
Total	33	13	20	0	0

=== Team and individual records ===
- Highest team total: 449/5 declared v Uganda, 1969
- Highest individual score: 183 by B Vashee v Uganda, 1969
- Best bowling: 7/76 by RC Wilson v Kenya, 1968

=== Notable players ===
The following players played for Northern Rhodesia/Zambia and also played representative cricket including first-class, List A cricket or minor counties:

- Keith W Arnold – played for East Africa.
- Derek Bruorton – played for Transvaal.
- Aubrey Dennis – played for North Eastern Transvaal.
- Chris English – played for Berkshire County Cricket Club
- Roger Henderson – played for Rhodesia.
- Wally Hitzeroth – played for Eastern Province and Rhodesia.
- Bernard Horton – played for Rhodesia.
- Michael Lee – played for Rhodesia and Western Province.
- Hamish McLeod – played for East Africa.
- Parbhu Nana – played for East Africa.
- Majid Pandor – played for East Africa.
- Yusuf Patel – played for East Africa.
- CD Patel – played for East Africa.
- Bimal Soni – played for Rajasthan.
- Peter Stimpson – played for Worcestershire.
- Jackie Ward – played for Transvaal and Rhodesia.
- Yunus Badat – played for East Africa.

== See also ==
- History of cricket in Zimbabwe to 1992
- East African cricket team
- East and Central African cricket team
- List of Zambia Twenty20 International cricketers
- Zambia women's national cricket team
