= Eswatini national cricket team =

Men's national cricket team

Eswatini
- Association: Eswatini Cricket Association

Personnel
- Captain: Melusi Magagula

History
- Twenty20 debut: v. Sierra Leone on 14 May 2011

International Cricket Council
- ICC status: Associate member (2017)
- ICC region: Africa
ICC Rankings	Current	Best-ever
T20I	68th	65th (6 Jun 2026)

International cricket
- First international: v. Zambia, 1981

T20 Internationals
- First T20I: v. Lesotho at IPRC Cricket Ground, Kigali; 16 October 2021
- Last T20I: v. Mozambique at Malkerns Country Club Oval, Malkerns; 7 June 2026
T20Is	Played	Won/Lost
Total	48	16/29 (1 tie, 2 no results)
This year	11	6/5 (0 ties, 0 no results)
T20I kit
- As of 7 June 2026

The Eswatini national cricket team represents Eswatini (formerly known as Swaziland), a country in Southern Africa, in international cricket. The Eswatini national cricket team, which is administered by the Eswatini Cricket Association (ECA), became an affiliate member of the International Cricket Council (ICC) in 2007. The ECA, along with the cricket associations of Cameroon, the Falkland Islands and Peru, was promoted to affiliate status in 2007 by the ICC. In 2017, they became associate members. Eswatini is also a member of the African Cricket Association. The Eswatini national cricket team competes in the World Cricket League Africa Region and the ICC Africa Twenty20 Championship.

In April 2018, the ICC decided to grant full Twenty20 International (T20I) status to all its members. Therefore, all Twenty20 matches played between Eswatini and other ICC members after 1 January 2019 have the T20I status.

== Origins ==
Cricket was first played in Swaziland in the 1970s by white expatriates who had come to the country to work. Swaziland has played international cricket since at least 1981, when Zambia toured for a two-match series. From 1992 the country played in the Zone Six African Cricket Confederation Championship which evolved into the Africa Cricket Association.

Swaziland was accepted into the ICC in 2007 as an affiliate member alongside Cameroon, the Falkland Islands and Peru. Affiliate status was the lowest of the three grades of ICC membership until 2017, when affiliate membership was abolished. At that time all affiliate members of the ICC became associate members. Affiliate members cannot play Test matches.

== 50 over cricket ==
=== 2008 ===
==== Division Three ====
Eswatini, as a member of the African Cricket Association, competes in the World Cricket League Africa Region which is a 50 over competition for African countries that are not full member of the ICC. For the 2008 edition, they would compete in division three. In the eight-team competition, Swaziland would compete alongside Gambia, Sierra Leone, Lesotho, Rwanda, Malawi, Ghana and a South African invitational team (South Africa's South Africa's national team are full member of the ICC). The Swazis were drawn in pool B with Gambia, Ghana and the South African invitational side. On 13 April 2008, the Swaziland national cricket team would play its first international match against Ghana at Willowmoore Park in South Africa. The Swazis would bat first and score 197 runs with captain Adrisbhai Patel the top scorer with 90 runs off 135 balls. The Ghanaians would chase the target inside 35 overs, having lost only three wickets. Therefore, Ghana won the match by seven wickets. The Swazis' second match was against the South African side. The South Africans won by 70 runs in a rain affected match. Swaziland's third pool match was their first ever win. They beat the Gambians by 91 runs after they bowled out the Gambians inside 44 overs for 135 runs after the Swazis' had set a target of 226 runs. These results would place Swaziland third in their pool. However, due to the South African side being ineligible to progress to the semi-finals, the Swazis made it to the semi-finals where they would play pool A topping Sierra Leone. The Sierra Leoneans would bat first and made 116 runs; Swaziland's Joseph Wright was the leading wicket taker with five. The Swazis would chase down the target in 30 overs to win by four wickets. Wright would top score for Swaziland with 48 runs. In the final the Swazis would play Ghana who had beaten Rwanda by eight wickets in their semi-final. In the final, held at Willowmoore Park, Swaziland would bat first and would score 195 runs. Abdul Patel would top score with 51 runs. In reply, the Ghanaians would chase down the total inside 42 overs, losing five wickets. Therefore, the Ghanaians won the match by five wickets.

==== Division Two ====
After their promotion from Division Three, the Swaziland national cricket team would compete in the 2008 ICC World Cricket League Africa Region Division Two. They would finish last in the competition, losing all their matches. Swaziland lost three matches by over 100 runs; to Nigeria, Mozambique and Zambia. They also lost to Ghana (by five wickets) and to Botswana (by ten wickets).

=== 2010 ===
In 2010 Swaziland would compete in Division Two of the ICC World Cricket League Africa Region Division. In the competition, they would be scheduled to play one game against Zambia, Ghana, Sierra Leone, Mozambique and Malawi. Both of Swaziland's first two games, against Ghana and Sierra Leone, would be abandoned due to rain. Swaziland then would play the Zambians, but lost by eight wickets. On 27 April 2010, the Swazis would play a game against Sierra Leone, which would be rescheduled due to the washout that had occurred earlier in the competition. Swaziland won by thirty runs in a rain-affected match. Swaziland then played Mozambique. Mozambique would score 127 runs and the Swazis would chase down the Mozambique total inside 43 overs to win by four wickets. Swaziland's final match of the competition was against Malawi. The Swazis won by nine wickets. The Swazis would finish third in the competition, behind Zambia and Ghana. They would not promote from Division Two.

== Twenty20 cricket ==
=== 2011–2012 ===
In Twenty20 cricket (T20), Swaziland would compete in the ICC Africa Twenty20 Championship. They made their T20 debut in the 2011 Second Division. Swaziland would finish sixth out of nine teams in the competition. They won three matches with wins against Mozambique, Rwanda and Malawi. They beat Mozambique by eight wickets, Rwanda by six wickets and Malawi by five runs. Swaziland lost against Sierra Leone, Botswana, Ghana, Tanzania, Nigeria. For the 2012 season, Swaziland again would compete in Division Two of the Africa Twenty20 Championship. The Swazis' only won one match; a six-wicket win over Seychelles. In the eight team competition, Swaziland would finish seventh; beating only Sierra Leone. Therefore, Swaziland, along with Sierra Leone, would be relegated to Division Three for the next season.

=== 2014 ===
==== Division Three ====
Due to their relegation in the previous year, Swaziland would compete in Division Three of the ICC Africa Twenty20 for 2014. The competition had four teams in it with Sierra Leone, Gambia and Rwanda competing alongside Swaziland. Each team would play twice against each other team. Swaziland's first game was a 63-run loss to Sierra Leone. The Swazis' then beat Gambia by 86 runs. Next they would play Rwanda and lost by six wickets. Swaziland then won three consecutive matches. They beat the Sierra Leoneans by 13 runs, the Gambians by 117 runs and the Rwandans by 34 runs. Overall, Swaziland won twelve points, the same as Sierra Leone. Rwanda won nine points and Gambia won two. Swaziland had a larger net run rate then Sierra Leone, and, therefore, Swaziland won the competition and promotion.

==== Division Two ====
Due to their promotion from Division Three, Swaziland would play in the 2014 ICC Africa Twenty20 Division Two. They won two matches; a 30-run win over Mozambique and an 8-run win over Seychelles. Overall they would finish fifth out of six teams and would not be promoted or relegated.

=== Suspension ===
Swaziland was due to compete in the 2016 ICC Africa Twenty20 Division Two; however, in February 2016, the ICC announced the disqualification of the Swazis from the competition, as they had fielded ineligible players in the 2014 Division Three competition. At least five illegal Asian players would play for Swaziland in the competition, including two that had played for Mozambique in 2012. Sierra Leone would file a complaint to ICC, and the ICC would decide that Swaziland had breached the player eligibility regulations. This meant that Swaziland could not compete in the 2016 Division Two competition, and would instead be replaced by Sierra Leone and Rwanda.

=== T20I status ===
Eswatini returned to international cricket in the 2018–19 ICC T20 World Cup Africa Qualifier. They won only one match, against Mozambique, and finished last in the Southern Regional Qualifier.

== Records and statistics ==
International Match Summary — Eswatini

Last updated 7 June 2026

Playing Record
Format	M	W	L	T	NR	Inaugural Match
Twenty20 Internationals	48	16	29	1	2	16 October 2021

=== Twenty20 International ===
- Highest team total: 237/4 v. Mozambique on 2 June 2026 at Malkerns Country Club Oval, Malkerns.
- Highest individual score: 116, Adil Butt v. Mozambique on 2 June 2026 at Malkerns Country Club Oval, Malkerns.
- Best individual bowling figures: 4/28, Delisa Malinga v. Mozambique on 31 July 2022 at Malkerns Country Club Oval, Malkerns.

Most T20I runs for Eswatini

Player	Runs	Average	Career span
Adil Butt	1,355	41.06	2022–2026
Tarun Sandeep	566	24.60	2022–2026
Umair Qasim	303	10.82	2021–2026
Hujeifa Jangariya	241	24.10	2023–2026
Haris Rashid	239	14.05	2022–2025

Most T20I wickets for Eswatini

Player	Wickets	Average	Career span
Melusi Magagula	42	20.09	2021–2026
Adil Butt	40	22.20	2022–2026
Umair Qasim	34	25.47	2021–2026
Mancoba Jele	31	25.58	2021–2026
Minhaz Khojbariya	18	24.94	2024–2026

T20I record versus other nations

Records complete to T20I #3942. Last updated 7 June 2026.

Opponent	M	W	L	T	NR	First match	First win
vs Associate Members
Botswana	2	0	2	0	0	29 May 2023	
Cameroon	1	0	0	0	1	8 December 2022	
Gambia	1	1	0	0	0	1 December 2022	1 December 2022
Ghana	3	0	3	0	0	20 October 2021	
Ivory Coast	1	1	0	0	0	27 November 2024	27 November 2024
Lesotho	9	6	3	0	0	16 October 2021	16 October 2021
Malawi	3	0	3	0	0	17 October 2021	
Mozambique	17	6	9	1	1	29 July 2022	12 September 2025
Nigeria	2	0	2	0	0	4 December 2022	
Rwanda	1	0	1	0	0	22 October 2021	
Saint Helena	2	2	0	0	0	24 November 2024	24 November 2024
Seychelles	1	0	1	0	0	20 October 2021	
Sierra Leone	2	0	2	0	0	5 December 2022	
Tanzania	2	0	2	0	0	6 December 2022	
Uganda	1	0	1	0	0	19 October 2021	

=== Other matches ===
For a list of selected international matches played by Eswatini/Swaziland, see Cricket Archive.

== International grounds ==
Locations of all stadiums which have hosted international cricket matches within Eswatini

== See also ==
- List of Eswatini Twenty20 International cricketers
- Eswatini women's national cricket team
