= Gambia national cricket team =

Gambia
- Association: Gambia Cricket Association

Personnel
- Captain: Peter Campbell

International Cricket Council
- ICC status: Associate member (2017)
- ICC region: Africa
ICC Rankings	Current	Best-ever
T20I	87th	74th (9 Dec 2022)

International cricket
- First international: v Sierra Leone, 1927

T20 Internationals
- First T20I: v Eswatini at IPRC Cricket Ground, Kigali; 1 December 2022
- Last T20I: v Lesotho at Nigeria Cricket Federation Oval 1, Abuja; 25 October 2026
T20Is	Played	Won/Lost
Total	17	2/15 (0 ties, 0 no results)
This year	5	1/4 (0 ties, 0 no results)
- As of 25 October 2026

The Gambia national cricket team represents the Gambia in international cricket. They became an affiliate member of the International Cricket Council (ICC) in 2002 and an associate member in 2017.

In April 2018, the ICC decided to grant full Twenty20 International (T20I) status to all its members. Therefore, all Twenty20 matches played between Gambia and other ICC members after 1 January 2019 have the T20I status.

== History ==
Cricket was introduced to the Gambia by the British during the colonial period. Gambia played against other British West African colonies from 1927, when they faced Sierra Leone for the first time. From the 1960s Gambia also played regularly against Nigeria, and later in the West African Championships.

Gambia was a member of the West Africa Cricket Council, which was an ICC member from 1976 to 2003, and fielded players in the West Africa cricket team until its dissolution. It became a member of the ICC in its own right in 2002. Gambia's ICC debut came at the African affiliate championship in 2004 where they finished sixth. In 2006 they played in the equivalent tournament, Division Three of the African qualifiers for the ICC World Cricket League, this time finishing in seventh place.

In 2021 Gambia was among five teams excluded from the ICC T20I Championship for failing to play enough fixtures in the relevant period, an effect of the COVID-19 pandemic.

== Current Squad ==
Name	Birth date	Batting style	Bowling style	Notes
Batsmen
5 October 2001 (age 25)	Right-handed	Right-arm medium		
Mustapha Suwareh	29 August 2001 (age 25)	Right-handed	Right-arm medium	
Muhammed Manga	3 December 2001 (age 24)	Right-handed	Right-arm medium	
Gabriel Riley	8 October 2003 (age 23)	Right-handed	Right-arm medium	
All-Rounders
Modou Bojang	29 October 2002 (age 24)	Right-handed	Right-arm medium	
Andre Jarju	13 December 1992 (age 33)	Right-handed	Right-arm medium	
Ismaila Tamba	2 March 1991 (age 35)	Right-handed	Right-arm medium	
Wicket-Keepers
Ousman Bah	10 October 1996 (age 30)	Right-handed	Right-arm medium	
Peter Campbell]]	7 November 1984 (age 41)	Right-handed	-	Captain
Pace Bowlers
Anniru Conteh	5 December 1988 (age 37)	Right-handed	Right-arm medium	
Musa Jobarteh	-	Right-handed	Right-arm medium-fast	
Spin Bowlers

== Tournament history ==
=== T20 World Cup Africa Sub-Regional Qualifier ===
T20 World Cup Africa Qualifier record
Year	Round	Position	GP	W	L	T	NR
(Namibia) 2021	Did not participate						
(Rwanda) 2022	Round-robin	7/8	7	1	6	0	0
(Kenya) 2024	Round-robin	6/6	5	0	5	0	0
(Nigeria) 2026	Round-robin	6/6	5	1	4	0	0
Total	–	–	17	2	15	0	0

== Records ==
International Match Summary — Gambia

Last updated 25 October 2026

Playing Record
Format	M	W	L	T	NR	Inaugural Match
Twenty20 Internationals	17	2	15	0	0	1 December 2021

=== Twenty20 International ===
T20I record versus other nations

Records complete to T20I #4218. Last updated 25 October 2026.

Opponent	M	W	L	T	NR	First match	First win
vs Full Members
Zimbabwe	1	0	1	0	0	23 October 2024	
vs Associate Members
Cameroon	1	1	0	0	0	9 December 2022	9 December 2022
Eswatini	1	0	1	0	0	1 December 2022	
Ghana	2	0	2	0	0	8 December 2022	
Kenya	1	0	1	0	0	22 October 2024	
Lesotho	1	1	0	0	0	25 October 2026	25 October 2026
Mozambique	3	0	3	0	0	8 December 2022	
Nigeria	2	0	2	0	0	4 December 2022	
Sierra Leone	1	0	1	0	0	6 December 2022	
Rwanda	1	0	1	0	0	8 December 2023	
Tanzania	1	0	1	0	0	6 December 2022	
Uganda	1	0	1	0	0	23 October 2026	
Zambia	1	0	1	0	0	24 October 2026	

=== Other records ===
For a list of selected international matches played by Gambia, see Cricket Archive.

== Grounds ==
Locations of all stadiums which have hosted an international cricket match within Gambia

== See also ==
- List of Gambia Twenty20 International cricketers
