= Ghana national cricket team =

Cricket team

Ghana
- Ghana flag
- Nickname: Black Batters
- Association: Ghana Cricket Association

Personnel
- Captain: Obed Harvey
- Coach: Bhupinder Brar

International Cricket Council
- ICC status: Associate member (2017)
- ICC region: Africa
ICC Rankings	Current	Best-ever
T20I	70th	28th (2 May 2019)

International cricket
- First international: (Gold Coast (British colony)) Gold Coast v. Lagos Colony (Lagos, 25 May 1904)

T20 Internationals
- First T20I: v Namibia at Kyambogo Cricket Oval, Kampala; 20 May 2019
- Last T20I: v Nigeria at Tafawa Balewa Square Cricket Oval, Lagos; 26 September 2026
T20Is	Played	Won/Lost
Total	56	24/30 (2 ties, 0 no results)
This year	9	4/4 (1 tie, 0 no results)
T20I kit
- As of 26 September 2026

The Ghana national cricket team represents Ghana in men's international cricket. It is an associate member of the International Cricket Council (ICC), which it joined as an affiliate member in 2002, and mainly plays matches in Africa Cricket Association tournaments. Ghana Cricket Association promotes the sport in the country.

A team representing the British Gold Coast played its first recorded match in 1904, and international matches from 1907. Known as Ghana after independence in 1957, until recent times the majority of the team's matches came against other West African teams, and occasionally against touring English teams. In 1976, Ghana joined the West Africa Cricket Council, with Ghanaian players representing the West African cricket team in international tournaments.

Following the breakup of the council, the Ghana Cricket Association gained affiliate membership of the ICC in 2002, with the national side making its debut at an ICC tournament in 2004. The first ICC tournament for the team was in Division Three of 2006 World Cricket League Africa Region, where it finished in the third place. The team won the Division Three of 2008 World Cricket League Africa Region by defeating Swaziland in the final.

== History ==
=== Colonial era ===
CricketArchive records a team representing the Gold Coast, a British colony, as having played its first match in May 1904, against Lagos Colony (in present-day Nigeria). Similar fixtures were played in the following two seasons, with the venue alternating between Lagos and Accra. A team representing the Southern Nigeria Protectorate toured in April 1907. Similar matches were played again in 1911, 1912, and 1913, with the host alternating each year. Although the sport had been introduced by British settlers, representative teams were multiracial from an early stage – the 1912 Gold Coast–Southern Nigeria fixture, the only pre-war match for which a scorecard is available, featured names like Otoo, Sagoe, Agbokpo, and Akufo (for Gold Coast), and Layode and Oseni (for Southern Nigeria). Gold Coast's Otoo took six wickets in Southern Nigeria's second innings, helping Gold Coast to an innings victory. However, European-only matches were introduced around the same time, beginning in 1906 and ending only in 1956, the year before Ghanaian independence. The Gold Coast's leading run-scorer in the inaugural European-only fixture was Gordon Guggisberg, who had earlier played a single first-class match (and was later Governor of the Gold Coast, from 1919 to 1927).

After a long gap, inter-colonial matches resumed in April 1926, when the Gold Coast played the Nigerian national team in Lagos. Gold Coast–Nigeria fixtures, both multiracial and European-only, were played almost annually from 1926 to 1939, and resumed again after World War II. In several years the European-only fixtures were played in provincial cities like Kumasi and Ibadan, although multiracial games were played only in the capitals. Gold Coast sides were occasionally bolstered by players of first-class standard – for instance, Cecil Pullan (Oxford University and Worcestershire) and Michael Green (Gloucestershire and Essex) appeared together in a 1937 match, with Pullan appearing again after the war. The national side played its first match as "Ghana" less than a month after Kwame Nkrumah's independence declaration in March 1957, with annual Ghana–Nigeria matches occurring until 1964.

=== West African era ===
A Marylebone Cricket Club (MCC) side toured West Africa during the 1975–76 season, and played two matches at Accra's Achimota School in January 1976 – one against an Accra side and one against the Ghanaian national side. The West Africa Cricket Council was formed later in 1976, with The Gambia and Sierra Leone joining Ghana and Nigeria as members. Consequently, with the exception of the quadrangular West African Championships, first held in 1976, Ghanaian cricketers played international matches only for the combined West African team, which made its international debut at the 1982 ICC Trophy. The West African side at the 1997 ICC Trophy was captained by Edinam Nutsugah, a Ghanaian. At that tournament, another Ghanaian, Daniel Vanderpuje-Orgle, took 5/31 against Israel, one of only four five-wicket hauls at the tournament. However, the West Africa Cricket Council lost significance in 2000, when Nigeria applied for separate membership of the ICC. The council was disbanded in 2003, with its members having become ICC members the previous year – Gambia, Ghana, and Sierra Leone were made affiliate members, and Nigeria an associate member.

=== 2000-2018 ===
A 2000 CricInfo article noted that cricket in Ghana was then confined to the south of the country, played only in the capital and the cities of Kumasi and Obuasi. It was also said to be particularly popular amongst the expatriate British and Indian populations, with the main club league featuring two Indian teams out of four total. Ghana played its first ICC tournament in March 2004, defeating Malawi in a play-off to finish third (of eight teams) in the Africa Affiliates Tournament. That tournament was part of the qualification process for the 2007 World Cup. The inaugural edition of the World Cricket League commenced in 2007, preceded by various regional qualifying tournaments. At the 2006 Africa Division Three qualifier, Ghana placed third behind Mozambique and Sierra Leone, again defeating Malawi in a third-place playoff. The playoff was noted for the performance of Ghanaian player Peter Ananya (a future national captain), who took 7/25 to bowl Malawi out for 41.

Ghana won the 2008 Africa Division Three tournament by defeating Swaziland in the final, having earlier bowled Rwanda out for 23 in their semi-final. They were subsequently promoted to the 2008 Africa Division Two tournament, but could only place fifth from six teams. This was enough, however, for Ghana to maintain its place for the 2010 Division Two event. At that tournament, they placed second to Zambia, securing entry to the 2012 Global Division Eight tournament. The only African side at the eight-team tournament, played in Samoa, Ghana lost only two matches, both to Vanuatu, placing runner-up and qualifying for the 2013 Global Division Seven event. Three of the six sides there were African, the others being Nigeria and Botswana, the hosts. Ghana won only two matches, both against Germany, and were relegated back to the regional tournaments system.

In international Twenty20 cricket, Ghana played its first tournaments in 2011, finishing runner-up to Nigeria in the 2011 Africa Division Two Twenty20 tournament and then fifth in 2011 Division One, both part of qualification for the 2012 World Twenty20. Earlier in the year, Ghana had hosted the Africa Division Three Twenty20, its first time hosting a senior ICC tournament. Ghana placed fourth at the 2012 Africa Division Two Twenty20, failing to qualify for the following year's Division One event. However, they went on to win the 2014 Division Two Twenty20, defeating Zambia on net run rate, and consequently progressing to the 2015 Africa Twenty20 Championship. There, Ghana defeated Tanzania, Botswana, and Uganda (for the first time), finishing fourth behind Uganda on net run rate. Against Uganda (a previous winner of the tournament), Ghana had made only 74/9 from its 20 overs, but managed to bowl Uganda out for 69.

In August 2018, they were included in the 2018 Africa T20 Cup tournament. However, Ghana declined Cricket South Africa's invite to compete in the tournament, and were replaced by Uganda.

=== 2018-Present ===
In April 2018, the ICC decided to grant full Twenty20 International (T20I) status to all its members. All Twenty20 matches played between Ghana and other ICC members after 1 January 2019 had the full T20I status. Ghana's first T20I match was against Namibia on 20 May 2019, after finishing top of the North-Western sub-region qualification group, advancing to the Regional Final of the 2018–19 ICC World Twenty20 Africa Qualifier tournament.

20 May 2019
13:50
Scorecard

Ghana; 91/7 (20 overs)	v	Namibia; 92/1 (10.5 overs)
Simon Ateak 26 (22); Zhivago Groenewald 3/20 (4 overs)		Stephan Baard 52* (34); Vincent Ateak 1/27 (3 overs)

Namibia won by 9 wickets
Kyambogo Cricket Oval, Kampala
Umpires: Iknow Chabi (Zim) and Kehinde Olanbiwonnu (Nga)
Player of the match: Stephan Baard (Nam)

- Namibia won the toss and elected to field.
- First ever T20I match for Ghana.

In 2021 Ghana was among five teams excluded from the ICC T20I Championship for failing to play enough fixtures in the relevant period, an effect of the COVID-19 pandemic.

== Grounds ==
Location of international cricket matches played in Ghana

== Tournament history ==
=== T20 World Cup Africa Regional Final ===
T20 World Cup Africa Regional Final record
Year	Round	Position	GP	W	L	T	NR
(Uganda) 2019	Round-robin	6/6	5	0	4	0	1
(Rwanda) 2021	Did not qualify						
(Namibia) 2023	Did not qualify						
(Zimbabwe) 2025	Did not qualify						
2027	Qualified						
Total	–	–	5	0	4	0	1

=== African Games ===
African Games record
Year	Round	Position	Pld	W	L	T	NR
(Ghana) 2023	Group stage	8/8	3	0	3	0	0
Total	0 titles	1/1	3	0	3	0	0

=== World Cricket League ===
- 2006 Africa Division Three: 3rd (8 teams)
- 2008 Africa Division Three: 1st (8 teams) – promoted
- 2008 Africa Division Two: 5th (6 teams)
- 2010 Africa Division Two: 2nd (6 teams)
- 2012 Global Division Eight: 2nd (8 teams) – promoted
- 2013 Global Division Seven: 5th (6 teams) – relegated
- 2017 ICC World Cricket League Africa Region Qualifiers: 1st (6 teams)
- 2017 Global Division Five: 7th (8 teams) – relegated

=== ICC Africa Twenty20 Championship ===
- 2011 Division Two: 2nd (9 teams) – promoted
- 2011 Division One: 5th (5 teams) – relegated
- 2012 Division Two: 4th (8 teams)
- 2013 Division One: did not qualify
- 2014 Division Two: 1st (6 teams) – promoted
- 2015 Division One: 4th (6 teams)

== Current squad ==
This lists all the players who have played for Ghana in the past 12 months or has been part of the latest T20I squad.

Name	Age	Batting style	Bowling style	Notes
Batters
Kevin Awala	27	Right-handed	Right-arm off break	
Alex Osei	27	Right-handed		
James Vifah	36	Right-handed	Right-arm medium	
Devender Singh	36	Right-handed		
All-rounders
Rexford Bakum	27	Right-handed	Right-arm medium	
Obed Harvey	36	Left-handed	Left-arm medium	Captain
Samson Awiah	27	Right-handed	Right-arm off break	
Richmond Baaleri	24	Right-handed	Right-arm off break	
Philip Yevugah	26	Right-handed	Right-arm medium	
Wicket-keepers
Joseph Theodore	27	Right-handed		
Spin Bowlers
Michael Aboagye	24	Right-handed	Right-arm leg break	
Pace Bowlers
Godfred Bakiweyem	27	Right-handed	Right-arm medium	
Kofi Bagabena	37	Right-handed	Right-arm medium	
Daniel Anefie	26	Right-handed	Right-arm medium	
Syed Aqeel Israr	38	Right-handed	Right-arm medium	
Lee Nyarko	18	Right-handed	Right-arm medium	

Updated as of 20 March 2024

== Records and statistics ==
International Match Summary — Ghana

Last updated 26 September 2026

Playing Record
Format	M	W	L	T	NR	Inaugural Match
Twenty20 Internationals	56	24	30	2	0	20 May 2019

=== Twenty20 International ===
- Highest team total: 239/5 v. Lesotho, 17 October 2021 at Gahanga International Cricket Stadium, Kigali.
- Highest individual score: 107*, Obed Harvey v. Gambia, 8 December 2022 at Gahanga International Cricket Stadium, Kigali.
- Best individual bowling figures: 5/9, Kofi Bagabena v. Seychelles, 16 October 2021 at Gahanga International Cricket Stadium, Kigali.

Most T20I runs for Ghana

Player	Runs	Average	Career span
Obed Harvey	733	20.36	2021–2026
Rexford Bakum	706	19.08	2019–2024
Samson Awiah	559	18.63	2021–2024
James Vifah	496	17.71	2019–2024
Richmond Baaleri	334	19.64	2021–2026

Most T20I wickets for Ghana

Player	Wickets	Average	Career span
Obed Harvey	59	14.13	2021–2026
Kofi Bagabena	35	19.60	2019–2024
Godfred Bakiweyem	35	21.51	2019–2024
Rexford Bakum	21	17.09	2021–2024
Richmond Baaleri	21	18.14	2021–2026

T20I record versus other nations

Records complete to T20I #4148. Last updated 26 September 2026.

Opponent	M	W	L	T	NR	First match	First win
vs Associate Members
Botswana	2	0	2	0	0	18 September 2022	
Cameroon	2	2	0	0	0	6 December 2022	6 December 2022
Eswatini	3	3	0	0	0	20 October 2021	20 October 2021
Gambia	2	2	0	0	0	8 December 2022	8 December 2022
Kenya	3	0	3	0	0	21 May 2019	
Lesotho	2	2	0	0	0	17 October 2021	17 October 2021
Malawi	3	2	1	0	0	19 October 2021	19 October 2021
Mali	1	1	0	0	0	26 September 2024	26 September 2024
Mozambique	2	1	1	0	0	16 September 2022	16 September 2022
Namibia	1	0	1	0	0	20 May 2019	
Nigeria	7	0	7	0	0	22 May 2019	
Rwanda	10	4	5	1	0	18 August 2021	18 August 2021
Saint Helena	1	1	0	0	0	27 March 2026	27 March 2026
Seychelles	2	2	0	0	0	16 October 2021	16 October 2021
Sierra Leone	8	4	4	0	0	5 December 2022	4 October 2023
Tanzania	3	0	2	1	0	4 December 2022	
Uganda	4	0	4	0	0	23 May 2019	

=== Other matches ===
For a list of selected international matches played by Ghana, see Cricket Archive (paid subscription required).

== See also ==
- List of Ghana Twenty20 International cricketers
