= Willowmoore Park =

Cricket stadium

Coordinates: 26°11′43″S 28°19′05″E

- Interactive map of Willowmoore Park

Ground information
- Location: Benoni, South Africa
- Country: South Africa
- Establishment: 1924
- Capacity: 20,000
- Tenants: South Africa national cricket team
- End names
- Chalet End; Ekurhuleni End

International information
- First men's ODI: 9 February 1997: India v Zimbabwe
- Last men's ODI: 31 March 2023: South Africa v Netherlands
- First men's T20I: 15 September 2022: Botswana v Uganda
- Last men's T20I: 19 December 2023: Kenya v Uganda
- First women's ODI: 28 March 2005: Sri Lanka v West Indies
- Last women's ODI: 23 December 2023: South Africa v Bangladesh
- First women's T20I: 22 May 2019: South Africa v Pakistan
- Last women's T20I: 27 March 2024: South Africa v Sri Lanka
- As of 27 March 2024; Source: ESPNcricinfo

Willowmoore Park is a multi-purpose stadium in Benoni, South Africa. It is currently used mostly for cricket matches and hosted two matches during the 2003 Cricket World Cup. The stadium holds 20,000 people. It opened in 1924.

== Records ==
=== T20I records ===
- Highest T20I total: 205/5 – Botswana vs. Eswatini, Southern Africa Cup, 29 May 2023
- Highest Individual T20I Score: 102 – Laura Wolvaardt, South Africa vs. Sri Lanka, 27 March 2024
- Best T20I Bowling Figure: 5/18 – Dhruv Maisuria, Botswana vs. Ghana, 2022 ACA Africa T20 Cup, 18 September 2022
- Highest T20I Partnership: 147* (for the 3rd wicket) – Riazat Ali Shah & Deusdedit Muhumuza, Uganda vs. Tanzania, 2022 ACA Africa T20 Cup, 22 September 2022

== List of International five-wicket hauls ==
The following table summarizes the five-wicket hauls taken in T20Is at this venue.

#	Figures	Player	Country	Innings	Opponent	Date	Result
1	5/18	Dhruv Maisuria	Botswana	2	Ghana	18 September 2022	Won
