= Sierra Leone national cricket team =

Cricket team

Sierra Leone
- Flag of Sierra Leone
- Association: Cricket Sierra Leone

Personnel
- Captain: George Edward Ngegba
- Coach: Solomon Fatoma

International Cricket Council
- ICC status: Associate member (2017); Affiliate member (2002)
- ICC region: Africa
ICC Rankings	Current	Best-ever
T20I	83rd	54th (2 May 2022)

International cricket
- First international: v Gambia, 1927

T20 Internationals
- First T20I: v Nigeria at University of Lagos Cricket Oval, Lagos; 19 October 2021
- Last T20I: v Nigeria at Tafawa Balewa Square Cricket Oval, Lagos; 27 September 2026
T20Is	Played	Won/Lost
Total	65	20/45 (0 ties, 0 no results)
This year	17	4/13 (0 ties, 0 no results)
Home kit
Away kit
- As of 27 September 2026

The Sierra Leone national cricket team represents Sierra Leone in men's international cricket. They became an affiliate member of the International Cricket Council (ICC) in 2002 and an associate member in 2017.

In April 2018, the ICC decided to grant full Twenty20 International (T20I) status to all its members. Therefore, all Twenty20 matches played between Sierra Leone and other ICC members since 1 January 2019 have the T20I status.

== History ==
The history of cricket in Sierra Leone dates back to the Sierra Leone Colony and Protectorate when it was introduced by the British. In 1887, a Sierra Leone team played a two-day match against a team from the West India Regiments. International cricket dates from the 1930s when Sierra Leone began to play Gambia. In 1967 the West African Championships were created with former British colonies Nigeria and Ghana also sending teams. Starting in 1991, the Sierra Leone Civil War caused a decline in cricketing activity, with the country's main ground Kingtom Oval used as a refugee camp.

Sierra Leone was a member of the West Africa Cricket Council which became a member of the ICC in 1976 and fielded the West Africa cricket team, before being dissolved in 2003. The Cricket Sierra Leone became an affiliate member of the ICC in its own right in 2002 and made its debut at an ICC tournament at the 2004 African Affiliates Championship, where they finished last out of the eight teams. They returned at the equivalent tournament in 2006, Division Three of the African region of the World Cricket League, where they showed major improvement, this time finishing as runners-up to Mozambique, and only just missing out on promotion to Division Two.

=== T20I status (2019-present) ===
Sierra Leone gained T20I status in 2019 and played their first match against Nigeria in 2021, securing a narrow win.

19 October 2021
12:00
Scorecard

Nigeria; 99 (20 overs)	v	Sierra Leone; 100/4 (20 overs)
Isaac Okpe 36 (27); Miniru Kpaka 4/11 (4 overs)		Lansana Lamin 28* (26); Sesan Adedeji 2/14 (2 overs)

Sierra Leone won by 6 wickets
University of Lagos Cricket Oval, Lagos
Umpires: Kehinde Olanbiwonnu (Nga)
Player of the match: Miniru Kpaka (Sle)

- Sierra Leone won the toss and elected to field.

In 2021 Sierra Leone was among five teams excluded from the ICC T20I Championship for failing to play enough fixtures in the relevant period, an effect of the COVID-19 pandemic.

== Current squad ==
This lists all the players who have played for Sierra Leone in the past 12 months or has been part of the latest T20I squad. Uncapped players are listed in italics. Updated as of 17 December 2023.

Name	Age	Batting style	Bowling style	Notes
Batters
Lansana Lamin	40	Right-handed	Right-arm medium	
Alusine Turay	19	Right-handed	Right-arm leg break	
Aruna Kainessie	25	Right-handed		
Yegbeh Jalloh	26	Right-handed	Right-arm medium	
Ibrahim Sesay	19	Right-handed	Right-arm medium	
All-rounders
George Edward Ngegba	23	Right-handed	Right-arm off break	Captain
Chernoh Bah	23	Right-handed	Right-arm medium	
Abass Gbla	29	Right-handed	Right-arm medium	
Miniru Kpaka	23	Right-handed	Right-arm medium	
Ibrahim Kamara	33	Right-handed	Right-arm medium	
John Lassayo	23	Right-handed	Right-arm off break	
Wicket-keeper
John Bangura	21	Right-handed		
Spin Bowler
Raymond Coker	19	Left-handed	Slow left-arm orthodox	
Pace Bowlers
George Sesay	19	Right-handed	Right-arm medium	
Samuel Conteh	23	Right-handed	Right-arm medium	

== Records ==
International Match Summary — Sierra Leone

Last updated 27 September 2026

Playing Record
Format	M	W	L	T	NR	Inaugural Match
Twenty20 Internationals	65	20	45	0	0	19 October 2021

=== Twenty20 International ===
- Highest team total: 189/2 v. Ivory Coast on 23 November 2024 at Tafawa Balewa Square Cricket Oval, Lagos
- Highest individual score: 78*, Alusine Turay v. Ghana on 17 December 2023 at Willowmoore Park, Benoni
- Best individual bowling figures: 5/16, Abass Gbla v. Nigeria on 26 October 2021 at University of Lagos Cricket Oval, Lagos

T20I record versus other nations

Records complete to T20I #4150. Last updated 27 September 2026.

Opponent	M	W	L	T	NR	First match	First win
vs Associate Members
Botswana	6	1	5	0	0	2 November 2021	15 December 2023
Cameroon	4	3	1	0	0	7 November 2021	7 November 2021
Eswatini	2	2	0	0	0	5 December 2022	5 December 2022
Gambia	1	1	0	0	0	6 December 2022	6 December 2022
Ghana	8	4	4	0	0	5 December 2022	5 December 2022
Ivory Coast	2	2	0	0	0	23 November 2024	23 November 2024
Kenya	5	0	5	0	0	7 December 2023	
Mali	2	2	0	0	0	9 December 2023	9 December 2023
Mozambique	2	1	1	0	0	5 November 2021	5 November 2021
Nigeria	15	1	14	0	0	19 October 2021	19 October 2021
Rwanda	9	1	8	0	0	6 October 2023	10 October 2023
Saint Helena	1	1	0	0	0	26 November 2024	26 November 2024
Tanzania	2	0	2	0	0	3 November 2021	
Uganda	2	0	2	0	0	9 September 2026	
Zambia	4	1	3	0	0	6 December 2025	13 December 2025

== See also ==
- List of Sierra Leone Twenty20 International cricketers
- Sierra Leone women's national cricket team
