= Nigeria national cricket team =

Nigeria
- Nickname: Yellow Greens
- Association: Nigeria Cricket Federation

Personnel
- Captain: Sylvester Okpe
- Coach: Steve Tikolo

History
- Twenty20 debut: Nigeria v. North West (Boland Park, South Africa; 14 September 2018)

International Cricket Council
- ICC status: Associate member (2002)
- ICC region: Africa
ICC Rankings	Current	Best-ever
T20I	39th	36th (25 May 2019)

International cricket
- First international: Lagos Colony v. Gold Coast (Gold Coast (British colony)) (Lagos, 25 May 1904)

T20 Internationals
- First T20I: v Kenya at Kyambogo Cricket Oval, Kampala; 20 May 2019
- Last T20I: v Uganda at Nigeria Cricket Federation Oval 1, Abuja; 25 October 2026
T20Is	Played	Won/Lost
Total	105	56/47 (0 ties, 2 no results)
This year	12	8/4 (0 ties, 0 no results)
- T20 World Cup Qualifier appearances: 3 (Note: T20 World Cup Qualifier refers to the Regional Finals of the ICC Africa region from the 2021 and 2023 edition.) (first in 2019)
- Best result: 4th (2021)
T20I kit
- As of 25 October 2026

The Nigeria national cricket team is the men's team that represents the country of Nigeria in international cricket. Cricket has been played in Nigeria since the late 19th century, and the national team played their first match in 1904, when a team representing the Lagos Colony played the Gold Coast Colony. The Nigeria Cricket Association, formed in 1932 and at first was composed only of expats. One year later. in 1933, an organization of indigenous players was formed. Nigeria has been an associate member of the International Cricket Council (ICC) since 2002.

== History ==
=== Early years ===
Cricket has been played in Nigeria since the late 19th century when the game was introduced by the British. English missionaries and army personnel further spread the sport.Contacts between the administration in Lagos and their counterparts in Gold Coast (now Ghana) led to an international at Race Course (now Tafawa Balewa Square), Lagos on 25 May 1904, the Gold Coast winning by 22 runs.

The match became an annual fixture and for the first three matches was multi-racial. The fourth fixture in December 1906 was for Europeans only, and the African population started their own annual fixture in 1907. Internationals stopped for the First World War, and did not restart until the mid-1920s.

Between the two world wars, cricket began to become more formally organised in the country with two cricket associations for the Europeans and Africans being formed in 1932 and 1933 respectively. First-class cricketers from England began to appear in the annual matches against Gold Coast, and the 1939 match, the last before World War II, ended in a 58-run win for the Gold Coast.

Matches resumed after the war with a five-day match in Lagos in 1947 which ended in a draw. The 1949 match went the way of the Gold Coast. As the number of Europeans working in the country reduced, the quality of the African players increased and cricket began to be organised on multi-racial lines in 1956.

=== Post independence ===
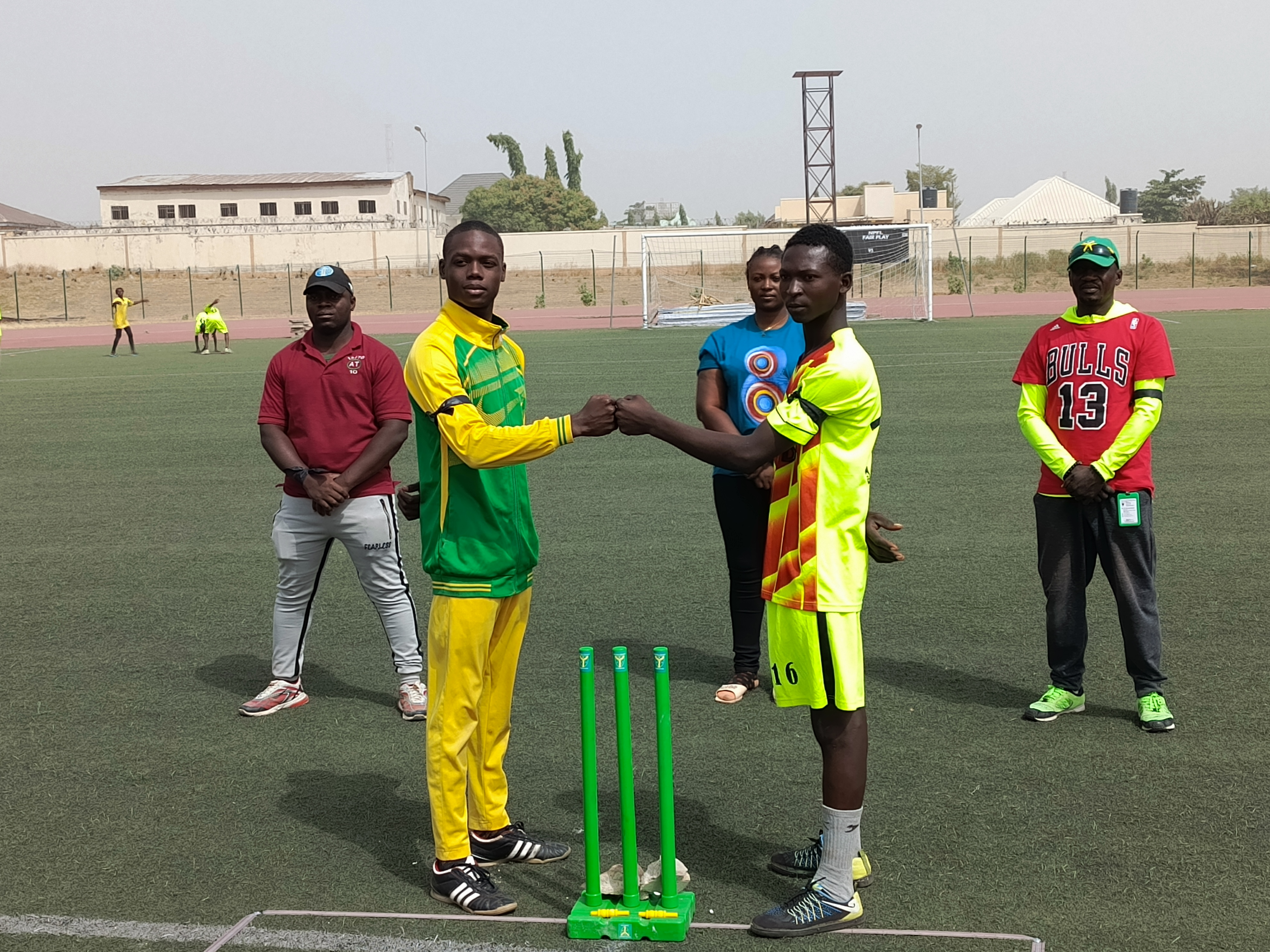
National U-17 Championship, Northeast Edition (elimination), 2024

Following Nigeria's independence in 1960, there was much interest in cricket. Annual matches against Sierra Leone and The Gambia began in 1964, and were evenly contested until the late 1970s, when football began to become more popular in the country. Cricket began a process of decline, and when Tanzania toured in 1974, Nigeria lost two of the three matches and drew the other. They also lost heavily to the MCC in 1976. Internal problems with both the Nigeria Cricket Association and in Nigeria itself led to a decline in standards, though Nigeria formed a majority of the players on the West Africa cricket team that became an ICC associate member in 1976.

The West Africa team took part in the ICC Trophy tournaments of 1982 and 1997 before withdrawing from the 2001 tournament in Ontario. Nigeria still continued to play on their own on occasion, though they sometimes withdrew from tournaments, as at the 1998 Africa Cricket Association Championship. The West African Cricket Conference ceased to exist in 2002, and Nigeria became an associate member of the ICC in their own right the same year.

=== ICC membership ===
Nigeria's first tournament after becoming an ICC member on their own was the 2002 Africa Cup in Zambia. Nigeria finished fourth in their group after their only win of the tournament against Malawi. They finished 5th in the Africa Cricket Association Championships in 2004, their only win coming against the last-placed Tanzania, thus failing to qualify for the 2005 ICC Trophy.

In August 2006, Nigeria took part in Division Two of the World Cricket League Africa Region in Tanzania, finishing last. This originally relegated them to Division Three, though they are not playing in that tournament in 2008. They won the North West Africa Championship in 2007 and 2008. Nigeria played in Division Two of the World Cricket League Africa Region in 2008 and came second hence qualifying for 2009 ICC World Cricket League Division Seven. They came 3rd in the tournament thus remaining in the division . In May 2011 Nigeria participated in the 2011 ICC World Cricket League Division Seven in Botswana. Nigeria came second in tournament, thus qualifying for 2011 ICC World Cricket League Division Six. Then the team went to South Africa in May 2011 to participate in 2011 ICC Africa Division Two (T20) en route to qualification of 2012 ICC World Twenty20. They won the tournament and qualified for 2011 ICC Africa Division One.

In August 2018, they were included in the 2018 Africa T20 Cup tournament.

=== 2018–present ===
In April 2018, the ICC decided to grant full Twenty20 International (T20I) status to all its members. Therefore, all Twenty20 matches played between Nigeria and other ICC members since 1 January 2019 have the T20I status. Nigeria's first T20I match was against Kenya on 20 May 2019, after finishing second in the North-Western sub-region qualification group, advancing to the Regional Final of the 2018–19 ICC World Twenty20 Africa Qualifier tournament.

20 May 2019
09:30
Scorecard

Nigeria; 105/5 (15 overs)	v	Kenya; 106/2 (12.2 overs)
Leke Oyede 27* (27); Shem Ngoche 2/6 (3 overs)		Dhiren Gondaria 47* (31); Leke Oyede 1/15 (3 overs)

Kenya won by 8 wickets
Kyambogo Cricket Oval, Kampala
Umpires: Andrew Louw (Nam) and Langton Rusere (Zim)
Player of the match: Shem Ngoche (Ken)

- Kenya won the toss and elected to field.
- First ever T20I match for Nigeria.

In July 2019, the ICC suspended Zimbabwe Cricket, with the team barred from taking part in ICC events. As a result of their suspension, the ICC confirmed that Nigeria would replace them in the 2019 ICC T20 World Cup Qualifier tournament.

== Grounds ==
The 2,000-capacity Tafawa Balewa Square Oval in Lagos is the largest cricket stadium in Nigeria.

Locations of all stadium(s) which have hosted international cricket matches within Nigeria

== Tournament history ==
=== T20 World Cup Africa Regional Final ===
T20 World Cup Africa Regional Final record
Year	Round	Position	GP	W	L	T	NR
(Uganda) 2019	Round-robin (A)	3/6	5	2	1	0	2
(Rwanda) 2021	Round-robin	4/4	6	0	6	0	0
(Namibia) 2022	Round-robin	5/7	6	1	4	0	1
(Zimbabwe) 2025	Play-offs	6/8	5	2	3	0	0
Total	4/4	0 Title	22	5	14	0	3

- A – Advanced to Global Qualifier.
- Q – Qualified for T20 World Cup.

=== African Games ===
African Games record
Year	Round	Position	Pld	W	L	T	NR
(Ghana) 2023	Group stage	7/8	3	1	2	0	0
Total	0 titles	–	3	1	2	0	0

=== Other tournaments ===
T20 World Cup Qualifier (T20I)	World Cricket League (List A/ODI)	WCL Africa Region (List A)	T20WC Africa Sub-regional Qualifiers (T20I)
2019: 14th place	2009: 3rd place (Division Seven); 2011: 2nd place (Division Seven); 2011: 5th place (Division Six); 2013: 1st place (Division Seven); 2013: 2nd place (Division Six); 2014: 4th place (Division Five); 2016: 6th place (Division Five)	2006: 5th place (Division Two); 2011: 1st place (Division Two) (T20)	2018 (North-West): Runners-up — Advanced; 2021: Did not participate; 2022: Runners-up — Advanced; 2024: Winners — Advanced; 2026: Winners — Advanced

== Records and statistics ==
International Match Summary — Nigeria

Last updated 25 October 2026

Playing Record
Format	M	W	L	T	NR	Inaugural Match
Twenty20 Internationals	105	56	47	0	2	20 May 2019

=== Twenty20 International ===
- Highest team total: 271/4 v. Ivory Coast on 24 November 2024 at Tafawa Balewa Square Cricket Oval, Lagos.
- Highest individual score: 112, Selim Salau v. Ivory Coast on 24 November 2024 at Tafawa Balewa Square Cricket Oval, Lagos.
- Best individual bowling figures: 6/5, Peter Aho v. Sierra Leone on 24 October 2021 at University of Lagos Cricket Oval, Lagos.

Most T20I runs for Nigeria

Player	Runs	Average	Career span
Isaac Danladi	1,621	28.94	2019–2026
Sulaimon Runsewe	1,455	20.78	2019–2026
Selim Salau	1,114	26.52	2024–2026
Isaac Okpe	900	14.51	2019–2026
Sylvester Okpe	838	15.51	2019–2026

Most T20I wickets for Nigeria

Player	Wickets	Average	Career span
Isaac Okpe	93	18.36	2019–2026
Sylvester Okpe	78	18.07	2019–2026
Peter Aho	74	17.25	2021–2026
Ridwan Abdulkareem	65	13.29	2021–2026
Prosper Useni	52	17.96	2021–2025

T20I record versus other nations

Records complete to T20I #4220. Last updated 25 October 2026.

Opponent	M	W	L	T	NR	First match	First win
v. Full members
Ireland	1	0	1	0	0	26 October 2019	
Zimbabwe	1	0	1	0	0	29 November 2023	
vs Associate Members
Botswana	6	5	1	0	0	21 May 2019	21 May 2019
Cameroon	1	1	0	0	0	5 December 2022	5 December 2022
Canada	1	0	1	0	0	21 October 2019	
Eswatini	2	2	0	0	0	4 December 2022	4 December 2022
Gambia	2	2	0	0	0	4 December 2022	4 December 2022
Ghana	7	7	0	0	0	22 May 2019	22 May 2019
Hong Kong	3	0	3	0	0	27 October 2019	
Ivory Coast	1	1	0	0	0	24 November 2024	24 November 2024
Jersey	1	0	1	0	0	19 October 2019	
Kenya	15	3	12	0	0	20 May 2019	16 September 2021
Lesotho	1	1	0	0	0	24 October 2026	24 October 2026
Malawi	1	1	0	0	0	26 September 2025	26 September 2025
Namibia	5	1	4	0	0	30 November 2023	18 March 2024
Oman	1	0	1	0	0	23 October 2019	
Mozambique	2	2	0	0	0	1 December 2022	1 December 2022
Rwanda	12	9	2	0	1	4 October 2023	4 October 2023
Saint Helena	1	1	0	0	0	23 November 2024	23 November 2024
Sierra Leone	15	14	1	0	0	19 October 2021	20 October 2021
Tanzania	5	1	3	0	1	17 November 2021	26 November 2023
Uganda	14	1	13	0	0	21 September 2021	25 October 2026
United Arab Emirates	3	0	3	0	0	24 October 2019	
Zambia	4	4	0	0	0	4 December 2025	4 December 2025

== Other First Class records ==
Performances by Nigerian cricketers in World Cricket League since 2009

Current players
Name	Matches	Runs	Wickets
Dotun Olatunji	18	599	0
Kunle Adegbola	34	588	33
Endurance Ofem	32	521	15
Ademola Onikoyi	34	502	1
Ricky Sharma	16	284	0
Segun Olayinka	29	584	0
Olajide Bejide	31	556	9
Joshua Ogunlola	29	124	44
Oluseye Olympio	27	154	29
Ositadinma Onwuzulike	18	127	10
Chimezie Onwuzulike	12	85	11
Saheed Akolade	31	98	48
Emmanuel Okwudili	20	351	0
Leke Oyede	10	84	5

Former players
Name	Matches	Runs	Wickets
Sean Phillips	13	386	14
Wale Adeoye	6	51	5
Femi Oduyebo	3	19	5
Ayo Mene Ejegi	4	25	4
Ramit Gill	13	203	8
Oluwaseun Odeku	7	55	3
Varun Behani	6	50	3
Haruna Thomas	2	3	1
Sesan Adedeji	3	29	1
Olalekan Awolowo	7	104	5
Joshua Ayannaike	1	6	0
Temitope Olayinka	4	12	

Highest Scores+

Dotun Olatunji – 127 vs Ghana at BCA Oval No. 1, Gaborone on 7 April 2013

Dotun Olatunji – 125* vs Botswana at BCA Oval No. 2, Gaborone on 9 April 2013

Olajide Bejide – 106 vs Tanzania at Royal Selangor Club, Kuala Lumpur on 13 March 2014

Segun Olayinka – 94* vs Argentina at Grainville, St Saviour on 28 July 2013

Endurance Ofem – 90 vs Cayman Islands at Kinrara Academy Oval, Kuala Lumpur on 9 March 2014

Best bowling figures

Oluseye Olympio – 6/23 vs Argentina at Grainville, St Saviour on 28 July 2013

Saheed Akolade – 6/27 vs Bahrain at Farmers CC, St Martin on 25 July 2013

Joshua Ogunlola – 5/28 vs Botswana at BCA Oval No. 2, Gaborone on 9 April 2013

Joshua Ogunlola – 5/34 vs Germany at BCA Oval No. 2, Gaborone on 12 April 2013

Olajide Bejide – 4/20 vs Kuwait at BCA Oval No. 1, Gaborone on 8 May 2011

- Highest team total: 397/7 declared v Gold Coast, 1932.
- Highest individual score: 166 by E Henshaw v Ghana, 1982 and by B Olufawo v Ghana, 2001.
- Best bowling: 7/65 by WS King v Gold Coast, 1952.

== Current squad ==
This lists all the players who have played for Nigeria in the past 12 months or has been part of the latest T20I squad. Updated as of 15 October 2023.

Name	Age	Batting style	Bowling style	Notes
Batters
Sesan Adedeji	30	Right-handed	Right-arm off break	
Akhere Isesele	25	Right-handed		
Isaac Danladi	24	Right-handed	Right-arm leg break	Vice-captain
Daniel Ajekun	29	Right-handed	Right-arm off break	
Selim Salau	21	Right-handed		
Ali Rahmon	17	Right-handed		
All-rounder
Isaac Okpe	31	Right-handed	Right-arm medium	
Wicket-keeper
Sulaimon Runsewe	25	Right-handed	Right-arm off break	
Spin Bowlers
Ridwan Abdulkareem	21	Right-handed	Right-arm off break	
Sylvester Okpe	25	Right-handed	Right-arm off break	Captain
Joshua Asia	20	Right-handed	Right-arm off break	
Pace Bowlers
Peter Aho	23	Right-handed	Right-arm medium	
Chiemelie Udekwe	21	Right-handed	Right-arm medium	
Prosper Useni	20	Left-handed	Left-arm medium	
Mohameed Taiwo	24	Left-handed	Left-arm medium	

=== Players ===
The following players have represented Nigeria internationally and also played first-class cricket:

- Henry Savory – played for Gloucestershire in 1937.
- Richard Parkhouse – played for Glamorgan in 1939.
- Geoffrey Anson – played for Cambridge University and Kent in 1947.
- Robert Melsome – played for Gloucestershire between 1925 and 1934.
- William Shirley – played for Hampshire and Cambridge University between 1922 and 1925.

== Coaching history ==
- 2009–2011: (Nigeria) Clive Ogbimi
- 2011–2012: (South Africa) Sean Phillips
- 2012–2019: (Nigeria) Clive Ogbimi
- 2020–2022: (Sri Lanka) Asanka Gurusinha
- 2022: (Nigeria) Clive Ogbimi (interim)
- 2022–present: (Kenya) Steve Tikolo

== See also ==
- List of Nigeria Twenty20 International cricketers
- Nigeria women's national cricket team
