= List of International Cricket Council members =

The International Cricket Council (ICC) is the global governing body of cricket. It was founded as the Imperial Cricket Conference in 1909 by representatives from Australia, England, and South Africa. In 1965, the body was renamed as the International Cricket Conference and adopted its current name in 1987. The governing bodies for cricket of a country recognised by the ICC as members take part in the competitions organised by the ICC. It has two membership categories: full and associate. Full members have full voting rights at meetings of the ICC and are qualified to play Test cricket, One Day Internationals (ODIs) and Twenty20 Internationals (T20Is). All associate members are eligible to play T20Is while only the top performing associates are eligible to play ODIs.

There are also 5 regional bodies under the ICC—Africa Cricket Association, ICC Americas, Asian Cricket Council, ICC East Asia-Pacific and ICC Europe—that aim to organise, promote and develop the game of cricket in their respective regions. As of July 2026, there are 111 ICC members, including 12 full members and 99 associate members. Of the associate members, 8 have men's ODI status and 5 have women's ODI status (3 have both).

== History ==
Current ICC members by membership status: Full members Associate members with ODI status Other associate members Former members Non-members

The International Cricket Council (ICC) was founded at Lord's on 15 June 1909 as the Imperial Cricket Conference, with Australia, England, and South Africa as its founding members. Initially only the countries within the Commonwealth were able to join the ICC. India, New Zealand and the West Indies joined in 1926, and Pakistan joined in 1953 after the partition of India. In 1961, South Africa resigned from the Conference due to them leaving the Commonwealth, but they continued to play Test cricket until their international exile in 1970.

The Imperial Cricket Conference was renamed as the International Cricket Conference in 1965, with new rules permitting countries from outside the Commonwealth to be elected into the ICC for the first time: Fiji and the USA became the first associate member nations that year. In 1981, Sri Lanka became the first associate member to be elected a full member. In 1989, the ICC was again renamed as the International Cricket Council. South Africa was re-elected as a full member of the ICC in 1991, with Zimbabwe elected in 1992, and Bangladesh elected in 2000. On 22 June 2017, Ireland and Afghanistan were granted full member status as well.

From July to October 2019, the ICC suspended Zimbabwe due to government interference, the first time this had occurred with a full member side. From November 2023 to January 2024, the ICC suspended Sri Lanka due to government interference in the board.

=== Selection and promotion ===
The membership committee will consider requests for membership – full and associate – against an objective set of criteria. There was previously a third level, affiliate membership, which was abolished in June 2017, with all existing affiliate members becoming associate members, and introducing a two-tier hierarchy (full members and associate members): any new member elected to the ICC would be an associate member, with the possibility of promotion to full member status based on ongoing performance in international competitions.

==== Membership criteria ====
In order for a nation to apply for associate membership they must meet 5 criteria given by the ICC:

1. An appropriate domestic cricket structure.
2. A recognized administrative governing body.
3. Proper domestic cricket competitions.
4. At least two cricket grounds in the country.
5. A "National Development Plan" and an annual budget.

For an associate member to apply for full membership they must have the following in-addition to the above criteria:

1. At least three appearances in men's Cricket World Cups or men's T20 World Cups in the last ICC men's hosts cycle.
2. Four wins against two or more full members over the last ICC men's hosts cycle.
3. At least one appearance in women's Cricket World Cup or women's T20 World Cup in the last ICC women's hosts cycle.
4. Currently present on the ICC Women's ODI Team Rankings.

If a member country (full or associate) fails to adhere to the ICC membership criteria, they will be suspended or expelled by the ICC.

== Full members ==
Full members are the governing bodies for cricket of a country recognised by the ICC, which have a right to send a representative team to play official Test matches, have full voting rights at meetings of the ICC, and are automatically qualified to play One Day Internationals and Twenty20 Internationals. There are 12 full members.

The West Indies cricket team is a combined team representing 15 countries and territories from the Caribbean, while the English cricket team represents both England and Wales and the Irish cricket team represents all of the island of Ireland. Of these 12 nations, Sri Lanka, Zimbabwe, Bangladesh, Afghanistan and Ireland played as associate members before being elected as full members. In April 2021, the ICC granted permanent women's Test and women's One Day International status to all the full member nations.

Later in 2021, the Taliban returned to power in Afghanistan and promptly banned women from sport; consequently, there have been calls to suspend Afghanistan's ICC membership. In 2023, Australia withdrew from a one-day series against Afghanistan to protest against the oppression of women in the country. The same year, Human Rights Watch called for Afghanistan's suspension. The Women's team, which was dissolved in 2021, has since written to the ICC requesting the formation of a refugee team based in Australia. In January 2025, the Afghanistan women's team played its first match since fleeing Afghanistan, an exhibition game in Melbourne.

Full members of the International Cricket Council
Country	Code (Note: The ICC assigns a two or three-letter country code (more properly termed a trigram or trigraph) to each of its member countries.)	Teams (Note: Key for the "Teams" column: M: Men's national cricket team; W: Women's national cricket team; A: National List A cricket team (only for full members); U19M: Under-19 men's national cricket team; U19W: Under-19 women's national cricket team (only for full members))	Governing body	Full member since	Test status since	Region (Note: The "Region" column refers to the countries' geographical location and not necessarily their regional membership.)	Ref.
Afghanistan	AFG	M • W • A • U19M • U19W	Afghanistan Cricket Board	22 June 2017	14 June 2018	Asia	
Australia	AUS	M • W • A • U19M • U19W	Cricket Australia	15 June 1909	15 March 1877	East Asia-Pacific	
Bangladesh	BAN	M • W • A • U19M • U19W	Bangladesh Cricket Board	26 June 2000	10 November 2000	Asia	
England	ENG	M • W • A • U19M • U19W	England and Wales Cricket Board	15 June 1909	15 March 1877	Europe	
India	IND	M • W • A • U19M • U19W	Board of Control for Cricket in India	31 May 1926	25 June 1932	Asia	
Ireland	IRE	M • W • A • U19M • U19W	Cricket Ireland	22 June 2017	11 May 2018	Europe	
New Zealand	NZ	M • W • A • U19M • U19W	New Zealand Cricket	31 May 1926	10 January 1930	East Asia-Pacific	
Pakistan	PAK	M • W • A • U19M • U19W	Pakistan Cricket Board	28 July 1952	16 October 1952	Asia	
South Africa	SA	M • W • A • U19M • U19W	Cricket South Africa	29 June 1991	12 March 1889	Africa	
Sri Lanka	SL	M • W • A • U19M • U19W	Sri Lanka Cricket	21 July 1981	17 February 1982	Asia	
West Indies	WI	M • W • A • U19M • U19W	Cricket West Indies	31 May 1926	23 June 1928	Americas	
Zimbabwe	ZIM	M • W • A • U19M • U19W	Zimbabwe Cricket	6 July 1992	18 October 1992	Africa	

== Associate members ==
Associate members are the governing bodies for cricket of a country recognised by the ICC, which does not qualify as a full member, but where cricket is firmly established and organised. There are 99 associate members, of which 3 have both men's and women's ODI status, 5 have men's ODI status only, and 2 have women's ODI status only.

Until 2019, all associates were eligible to play in the World Cricket League, a series of international one-day cricket matches administered by the ICC which formed part of the Cricket World Cup qualification. From 2019 onwards this was replaced by the Cricket World Cup League 2 and Cricket World Cup Challenge League in which only the top twenty associates participate. Associates are also eligible to play in the T20 World Cup Regional Qualifiers (men's and women's) which forms part of the T20 World Cup qualification (men's and women's); until April 2018, only the teams qualified for final stage were awarded Twenty20 International status. In April 2018, the ICC announced T20I status for all its members from 1 July 2018 for the women's game, and from 1 January 2019 for the men's game.

† denotes associates with ODI status (men's, women's or both).

Associate members of the International Cricket Council
Country	Code	Teams	Governing body	Affiliate since	Associate since	Region	Ref.
Argentina	ARG	M • W • U19M	Argentine Cricket Association	N/A	1974	Americas	
Austria	AUT	M • W • U19M	Austrian Cricket Association	1992	2017	Europe	
Bahamas	BAH	M • W • U19M	Bahamas Cricket Association	1987	2017	Americas	
Bahrain	BHR	M • W • U19M	Bahrain Cricket Federation	2001	2017	Asia	
Belgium	BEL	M • W • U19M	Belgian Cricket Federation	1991	2005	Europe	
Belize	BLZ	M • W • U19M	Belize National Cricket Association	1997	2017	Americas	
Bermuda	BER	M • W • U19M	Bermuda Cricket Board	N/A	1966	Americas	
Bhutan	BHU	M • W • U19M	Bhutan Cricket Council Board	2001	2017	Asia	
Botswana	BOT	M • W • U19M	Botswana Cricket Association	2001	2005	Africa	
Brazil	BRA	M • W • U19M	Brazilian Cricket Confederation	2002	2017	Americas	
Bulgaria	BUL	M • W • U19M	Bulgarian Cricket Federation	2008	2017	Europe	
Cambodia	CAM	M • W • U19M	Cricket Association of Cambodia	N/A	2022	Asia	
Cameroon	CMR	M • W • U19M	Cameroon Cricket Federation	2007	2017	Africa	
Canada†	CAN	M • W • U19M	Cricket Canada	N/A	1968–2026	Americas	
Cayman Islands	CAY	M • W • U19M	Cayman Islands Cricket Association	1997	2002	Americas	
Chile	CHI	M • W • U19M	Cricket Chile	2002	2017	Americas	
China	CHN	M • W • U19M	Chinese Cricket Association	2004	2017	Asia	
Cook Islands	COK	M • W • U19M	Cook Islands Cricket Association	2000	2017	East Asia-Pacific	
Costa Rica	CRC	M • W • U19M	Costa Rica Cricket Federation	2002	2017	Americas	
Croatia	CRO	M • W • U19M	Croatian Cricket Federation	2001	2017	Europe	
Cyprus	CYP	M • W • U19M	Cyprus Cricket Association	1999	2017	Europe	
Czech Republic	CZE	M • W • U19M	Czech Cricket	2000	2017	Europe	
Denmark	DEN	M • W • U19M	Danish Cricket Federation	N/A	1966	Europe	
Estonia	EST	M • W • U19M	Estonian Cricket Association	2008	2017	Europe	
Eswatini	SWZ	M • W • U19M	Eswatini Cricket Association	2007	2017	Africa	
Falkland Islands	FLK	M • W • U19M	Falkland Cricket Association	2007	2017	Americas	
Fiji	FIJ	M • W • U19M	Cricket Fiji	N/A	1965	East Asia-Pacific	
Finland	FIN	M • W • U19M	Cricket Finland	2000	2017	Europe	
France	FRA	M • W • U19M	France Cricket	1987	1998	Europe	
Gambia	GMB	M • W • U19M	Gambia Cricket Association	2002	2017	Africa	
Germany	GER	M • W • U19M	German Cricket Federation	1991	1999	Europe	
Ghana	GHA	M • W • U19M	Ghana Cricket Association	2002	2017	Africa	
Gibraltar	GIB	M • W • U19M	Gibraltar Cricket Association	N/A	1969	Europe	
Greece	GRE	M • W • U19M	Hellenic Cricket Federation	1995	2017	Europe	
Guernsey	GUE	M • W • U19M	Guernsey Cricket Board	2005	2008	Europe	
Hong Kong	HKG	M • W • U19M	Cricket Hong Kong	N/A	1969	Asia	
Hungary	HUN	M • W • U19M	Hungarian Cricket Association	2012	2017	Europe	
Indonesia	IDN	M • W • U19M	Indonesian Cricket Association	2001	2017	East Asia-Pacific	
Iran	IRN	M • W • U19M	Iran Cricket Association	2003	2017	Asia	
Isle of Man	IOM	M • W • U19M	Isle of Man Cricket Association	2004	2017	Europe	
Israel	ISR	M • W • U19M	Israel Cricket Association	N/A	1974	Europe	
Italy	ITA	M • W • U19M	Italian Cricket Federation	1984	1995	Europe	
Ivory Coast	CIV	M • W • U19M	Fédération Ivoirienne De Cricket	N/A	2022	Africa	
Japan	JPN	M • W • U19M	Japan Cricket Association	1989	2005	East Asia-Pacific	
Jersey	JER	M • W • U19M	Jersey Cricket Board	2005	2007	Europe	
Kenya	KEN	M • W • U19M	Cricket Kenya	N/A	1981	Africa	
Kuwait	KUW	M • W • U19M	Kuwait Cricket	1998	2005	Asia	
Lesotho	LES	M • W • U19M	Lesotho Cricket Association	2001	2017	Africa	
Luxembourg	LUX	M • W • U19M	Luxembourg Cricket Federation	1998	2017	Europe	
Malawi	MWI	M • W • U19M	Malawi Cricket Union	1998	2017	Africa	
Malaysia	MAS	M • W • U19M	Malaysian Cricket Association	N/A	1967	Asia	
Maldives	MDV	M • W • U19M	Cricket Board of Maldives	1998	2017	Asia	
Mali	MLI	M • W • U19M	Malian Cricket Federation	2005	2017	Africa	
Malta	MLT	M • W • U19M	Malta Cricket Association	1998	2017	Europe	
Mauritius	MUS	M • W • U19M	Mauritius Cricket Federation	2006	2026	Africa	
Mexico	MEX	M • W • U19M	Mexico Cricket Association	2004	2017	Americas	
Mongolia	MNG	M • W • U19M	Mongolia Cricket Association	N/A	2021	Asia	
Mozambique	MOZ	M • W • U19M	Mozambican Cricket Association	2003	2017	Africa	
Myanmar	MYA	M • W • U19M	Myanmar Cricket Federation	2006	2017	Asia	
Namibia†	NAM	M • W • U19M	Cricket Namibia	N/A	1992	Africa	
Nepal†	NEP	M • W • U19M • U19W	Cricket Association of Nepal	1988	1996	Asia	
Netherlands†	NED	M • W • U19M	Royal Dutch Cricket Association	N/A	1966	Europe	
Nigeria	NGA	M • W • U19M	Nigeria Cricket Federation	N/A	2002	Africa	
Norway	NOR	M • W • U19M	Norwegian Cricket Federation	2000	2017	Europe	
Oman†	OMA	M • W • U19M	Oman Cricket	2000	2014	Asia	
Panama	PAN	M • W • U19M	Panama Cricket Association	2002	2017	Americas	
Papua New Guinea†	PNG	M • W • U19M	Cricket PNG	N/A	1973	East Asia-Pacific	
Peru	PER	M • W • U19M	Cricket Peru	2007	2017	Americas	
Philippines	PHI	M • W • U19M	Philippine Cricket Association	2000	2017	East Asia-Pacific	
Portugal	POR	M • W • U19M	Portuguese Cricket Federation	1996	2017	Europe	
Qatar	QAT	M • W • U19M	Qatar Cricket Association	1999	2017	Asia	
Romania	ROU	M • W • U19M	Cricket Romania	2013	2017	Europe	
Rwanda	RWA	M • W • U19M	Rwanda Cricket Association	2003	2017	Africa	
Saint Helena	SHN	M • W • U19M	St Helena Cricket Association	2001	2017	Africa	
Samoa	SAM	M • W • U19M	Samoa International Cricket Association	2000	2017	East Asia-Pacific	
Saudi Arabia	KSA	M • W • U19M	Saudi Arabian Cricket Federation	2003	2016	Asia	
Scotland†	SCO	M • W • U19M	Cricket Scotland	N/A	1994	Europe	
Serbia	SRB	M • W • U19M	Serbian Cricket Federation	2015	2017	Europe	
Seychelles	SEY	M • W • U19M	Seychelles Cricket Association	2010	2017	Africa	
Sierra Leone	SLE	M • W • U19M	Cricket Sierra Leone	2002	2017	Africa	
Singapore	SGP	M • W • U19M	Singapore Cricket Association	N/A	1974	Asia	
Slovenia	SVN	M • W • U19M	Slovenian Cricket Association	2005	2017	Europe	
South Korea	KOR	M • W • U19M	Korea Cricket Association	2001	2017	East Asia-Pacific	
Spain	ESP	M • W • U19M	Cricket Spain	1992	2017	Europe	
Suriname	SUR	M • W • U19M	Suriname Cricket Board	2002	2011	Americas	
Sweden	SWE	M • W • U19M	Swedish Cricket Federation	1997	2017	Europe	
Switzerland	SUI	M • W • U19M	Cricket Switzerland	1985–2012 (Note: Switzerland were admitted in 1985, but were expelled in 2012, before being readmitted in July 2021.)	2021	Europe	
Tajikistan	TJK	M • W • U19M	Tajikistan Cricket Federation	N/A	2021	Asia	
Tanzania	TAN	M • W • U19M	Tanzania Cricket Association	N/A	2001	Africa	
Thailand†	THA	M • W • U19M	Cricket Association of Thailand	1995	2005	Asia	
Timor-Leste	TLS	M • W • U19M	Timor-Leste Cricket Board	N/A	2025	East Asia-Pacific	
Turkey	TUR	M • W • U19M	Cricket Turkey	2008	2017	Europe	
Turks and Caicos Islands	TCA	M • W • U19M	Turks and Caicos Cricket Association	2002	2017	Americas	
Uganda	UGA	M • W • U19M	Uganda Cricket Association	N/A	1998	Africa	
United Arab Emirates†	UAE	M • W • U19M	Emirates Cricket Board	1989	1990	Asia	
United States†	USA	M • W • U19M	USA Cricket	N/A	1965–2017, (Note: The USA were admitted as an associate member in 1965 under the governance of the United States of America Cricket Association, which was expelled in September 2017. USA Cricket was admitted in January 2019.) 2019–2025 (Note: The USA Cricket was suspended in September 2025.)	Americas	
Uzbekistan	UZB	M • W • U19M	Cricket Federation of Uzbekistan	N/A	2022	Asia	
Vanuatu	VAN	M • W • U19M	Vanuatu Cricket Association	1995	2009	East Asia-Pacific	
Zambia	ZAM	M • W • U19M	Zambia Cricket Union	N/A	2003–2021, (Note: Zambia were admitted as an associate member in 2003, but was suspended in 2019 for non-compliant with ICC's finance statute and was expelled in 2021, before being re-admitted in July 2025.) 2025	Africa	

=== Associate members with ODI status ===
The ICC granted men's ODI status to its associate members based on their progress in the World Cricket League; the World Cricket League was replaced in 2019 and ODI status went to only the teams qualified for the Cricket World Cup Super League and CWC League 2. The CWC Super League was cancelled after the inaugural 2020–2023 Super League and ODI status now goes exclusively to teams participating in the CWC League 2. The Netherlands ensured they would regain ODI status after the completion of the 2018 CWC Qualifier, by winning the 2015–2017 WCL Championship. The next three highest placed associates in the qualifier (United Arab Emirates, Scotland and Nepal) also gained ODI status. Four additional teams (Namibia, Oman, Papua New Guinea and the United States) gained ODI status after the conclusion of the 2019 WCL Division Two tournament in April 2019.

On 25 May 2022, five associate teams (Netherlands, Papua New Guinea, Scotland, Thailand and the United States) were granted women's ODI status by the ICC. After finishing as bottom two in the 2023 CWC Qualifier Play-off, Papua New Guinea lost their men's ODI status to Canada who finished in the top four of the 2023 Qualifier Play-off. On 2 May 2025, the ICC announced that United Arab Emirates would be replacing the United States from 12 May 2025 among the five associate teams, gaining women's ODI status.

Teams have only men's or women's ODI status.
— Teams have ODI status but are currently not ranked in the ODI rankings.

Associate members with current ODI status
Country	Code	Governing body	ODI status since		Region	Current ODI ranking	
Country	Code	Governing body	Men's	Women's	Region	Men's (Note: Source: ICC Men's ODI Team Rankings as of 5 April 2025)	Women's (Note: Source: ICC Women's ODI Team Rankings as of 2 May 2025)
Canada	CAN	Cricket Canada	2023	No	Americas	16	No
Namibia	NAM	Cricket Namibia	2019	No	Africa	19	No
Nepal	NEP	Cricket Association of Nepal	2018	No	Asia	18	No
Netherlands	NED	Royal Dutch Cricket Association	2018	2022	Europe	14	13
Oman	OMA	Oman Cricket	2019	No	Asia	17	No
Papua New Guinea	PNG	Cricket PNG	No	2022	East Asia-Pacific	No	15
Scotland	SCO	Cricket Scotland	2018	2022	Europe	12	12
Thailand	THA	Cricket Association of Thailand	No	2022	Asia	No	11
United Arab Emirates	UAE	Emirates Cricket Board	2018	2025	Asia	20	—N/a
United States	USA	USA Cricket	2019	No	Americas	15	No

=== Associate members with T20I status ===
In April 2018, the ICC announced Twenty20 International status for all members from 1 January 2019. Therefore, all Twenty20 matches played between ICC members since 1 January 2019 have been eligible for full T20I status.

== Former members ==
Cuba was suspended in 2013 for failing to adhere to ICC's guidelines. Tonga was suspended in 2013 for not having a full-time administrator and was expelled in 2014. Brunei was suspended in 2014 for failing to comply with any of the ICC criteria and was expelled in 2015. Morocco was suspended in 2014 for non-compliance with four of the ICC criteria and was expelled in 2019. Russia was suspended in 2021 for non-compliance with ICC and was expelled in 2022.

Former members of the International Cricket Council
Country	Code	Teams	Governing body	Region	Membership
Brunei	BRU	M • W • U19M	Brunei Darussalam National Cricket Association	Asia	2002–2015
Cuba	CUB	M • W • U19M	Cuban Cricket Commission	Americas	2002–2013
Morocco	MAR	M • W • U19M	Royal Moroccan Cricket Federation	Africa	1999–2019
Russia	RUS	M • W • U19M	Cricket Russia	Europe	2012–2022
Tonga	TGA	M • W • U19M	Tonga Cricket Association	East Asia-Pacific	2000–2014

== Regional bodies ==
There are 5 regional bodies, that aim to organise, promote and develop the game of cricket in their respective regions.

The European Cricket Council which oversaw cricket in Europe from 1997 was dissolved in 2010, after ICC Europe overtook since 2008. The East African Cricket Conference which oversaw cricket in Kenya, Uganda, Tanzania and Zambia from 1966, was succeeded by the East and Central Africa Cricket Conference in 1989 which oversaw cricket in Uganda, Tanzania, Zambia and Malawi. The West Africa Cricket Council oversaw cricket in Gambia, Ghana, Nigeria and Sierra Leone from 1976. Both East and Central Africa Cricket Conference and West Africa Cricket Council were dissolved in 2003 following the creation of the Africa Cricket Association.

Current regional bodies under the International Cricket Council
Region	Governing body	No. of ICC members in the region		Ref.
Region	Governing body	Full	Associate	Ref.
Africa	Africa Cricket Association	2	20	
Americas	ICC Americas	1	16	
Asia	Asian Cricket Council	5	20	
East Asia-Pacific	ICC East Asia-Pacific	2	10	
Europe	ICC Europe	2	32	
