= Josefa Rika =

Fijian cricketer (1987–2020)

Personal information
- Full name: Josefa Falani Rika
- Born: 9 November 1987; Fiji
- Died: 3 February 2020 (aged 32)
- Batting: Left-handed
- Bowling: Right-arm off spin

International information
- National side: Fiji (2006–2015)
- Source: CricketArchive, 26 August 2015

Josefa Falani Rika (9 November 1987 – 3 February 2020) was a Fijian cricket player and coach. He played for the Fiji national cricket team from 2006 to 2015. He captained Fiji in several international tournaments and also worked for Cricket Fiji in coaching and development roles.

== Personal life ==
Rika was born in Fiji on 9 November 1987. He was from the village of Makadru on Matuku Island and was educated at Lelean Memorial School. His older brother Collin also played cricket for Fiji.

Rika had three children with his wife Natasha. He died on 3 February 2020 at the age of 32 after suffering an asthma attack.

== Playing career ==
Rika made his debut for the Fijian under-19 team at the 2001 EAP Under-19 Trophy, aged only 13. Playing alongside his older brother, Colin, he played in all four matches, but scored only 14 runs and failed to take a wicket. In 2003 and 2005, no separate under-19 tournament was held for ICC East Asia-Pacific members, with those teams instead competing alongside teams from the ICC Africa region. In the 2003 combined tournament in Namibia, both Fiji and Rika had little luck with the bat, although Rika took figures of 3/14 against Nigeria. At the 2005 combined tournament in South Africa, he was Fiji's leading runscorer, finishing with 126 runs. His best was 41, against Uganda.

The EAP Under-19 Trophy and Africa Under-19 Championships were re-established as separate competitions in 2007, with the EAP tournament held in Vanuatu. Appointed Fiji's captain, Rika began the tournament with scores of two against Vanuatu and four against Papua New Guinea, but in the following match, against Japan, scored a remarkable 257 runs from 145 balls, out of a team total of 440/8. His innings included 37 fours and 9 sixes, including three sixes in consecutive balls at one point. A writer for Cricinfo described Rika's innings as "what must rank as one of the most breathtaking knocks in the history of age-group cricket". Fiji again faced Japan in its next match, the third-place playoff, and were set a total of only 36 runs, with Rika scoring another 28 not out from 10 balls. Unsurprisingly, he led the tournament in both batting average and runs scored – the next-best Fijian batsman scored only 50 runs overall.

That 2007 tournament was Rika's last at the under-19 level, and he made his senior debut in the gap between under-19 events, appearing for Fiji in the 2006 EAP Trophy and the 2007 World Cricket League Division Three tournament. His EAP Trophy had included an innings of 50 not out in the opening match against Japan, made from 49 balls. At the 2008 WCL Division Four tournament in Tanzania, Rika was the only Fijian batsman to record more than 100 runs overall, finishing with 194 runs and a batting average of 32.33. His best innings, 62, came in the 5th-place playoff against Jersey, which Fiji won. However, both teams were relegated to the 2010 Division Five tournament in Nepal. Rika, aged 22 at the time, was appointed Fiji's captain in the place of the injured Joe Sorovakatini, and again made his highest score against Jersey, although his innings of 75 from 134 balls was not enough to prevent his side losing. Fiji and Jersey were eventually both relegated again, to the 2011 Division Six event in Malaysia. Again named captain, Rika led Fiji's batting with 185 runs from six innings, and twice scored half-centuries – 55 against Kuwait and 52 against Jersey.

At the 2013 WCL Division Seven tournament in Botswana, Rika scored 76 from 122 balls against Ghana, but also recorded two ducks, against Botswana and Germany. At the end of the tournament, he announced that he would be retiring from playing, despite being only 25. However, in June 2014 he announced that he would come out of retirement and continue playing for Fiji in international tournaments, alongside his development work. Rika captained Fiji at the 2014 EAP Twenty20 Championship and was also named for the 2015 WCL Division Six tournament in England.

== Coaching career ==
Rika was appointed as development manager of Cricket Fiji in 2010. He coached Fiji at the 2013 EAP Under-19 Trophy. He also coached the Fiji women's national cricket team at the 2015 Pacific Games.
