= ICC U19 Cricket World Cup EAP Qualifier =

Sports event

- Administrator: ICC East Asia-Pacific
- Format: 50-over
- First edition: 2001
- Latest edition: 2025
- Current champion: Japan (2nd title)
- Most successful: Papua New Guinea (6 titles)
- 2026 Under-19 Cricket World Cup qualification

ICC U19 Cricket World Cup EAP Qualifier (formerly EAP Under-19 Cricket Trophy) is a regular cricket competition organised by ICC East Asia-Pacific (EAP) for the under-19 teams of its representative nations. The tournament acts as a qualifier for the Under-19 World Cup.

The tournament was first held in 2001, and has been held regularly since 2007. Prior to 2001, EAP teams could attempt to qualify for the World Cup via the Youth Asia Cup, an Asian Cricket Council (ACC) event. In 2003 and 2005, a joint event was organised with the African Cricket Association.

Papua New Guinea have won the most editions of the tournament, with six titles, and also won the 2003 joint Africa/EAP tournament. Japan are second most successful team having won twice (2019, 2025). Fiji (2015), and New Zealand (2023) have also won the tournament.

== History ==
Since its inception, the EAP U-19 Cricket Trophy has provided a chance for EAP teams to qualify for the U-19 World Cup. Prior to the initial 2001 competition, however, EAP teams qualified via the Youth Asia Cup. In the 1997 event, Papua New Guinea qualified alongside then associate side Bangladesh to qualify for the 1998 U-19 World Cup. No EAP sides qualified from the 1999 competition.

In the first EAP U-19 Trophy, only the two most long standing EAP members participated, Papua New Guinea and Fiji alongside ACC side Hong Kong. Papua New Guinea won the three team event and so qualified for their second U-19 World Cup in 2002.

During the interim years when an EAP competition was not organised, a joint qualification event with the African Cricket Association took place. Once again, only Fiji and Papua New Guinea participated from the EAP region and World Cup qualification was only achieved by Papua New Guinea for the 2004 U-19 World Cup.

With an increase of teams from the EAP region able to participate, a standalone EAP Trophy once again took place in 2007 with Papua New Guinea and Fiji joined by Vanuatu and Japan. By 2009 there were five teams with the inclusion of Indonesia. In 2007 only one team qualified but in 2009 two teams went through to a further stage of qualification, the Under-19 World Cup Qualifier.

In the 2020 Under-19 Cricket World Cup qualification, Papua New Guinea and Japan were undefeated going into the final game against each other. However, Papua New Guinea forfeited the match after Cricket PNG suspended eleven members of the squad due to breaching the team's code of conduct. Japan thus qualified for its first ever Under-19 World Cup.

== Tournament results ==
Year	Host(s)	Venue(s)	Final		
Year	Host(s)	Venue(s)	Winner	Result	Runner-up
2001	Fiji	Nadi	PNG; 121/1 (12.2 overs)	PNG won by 9 wickets scorecard	Hong Kong; 119 all out (41 overs)
2003 (with ACA)	Namibia	Windhoek	PNG; 9/193 (50 overs)	PNG won by 53 runs scorecard	Uganda; 140 all out
2005 (with ACA)	South Africa	Benoni	Namibia; 140/7 (43.3 overs)	Namibia won by 3 wickets scorecard	Uganda; 139 (47.3 overs)
2007	Vanuatu	Port Vila	PNG; 207 all out (48.2 overs)	PNG won by 104 runs scorecard	Vanuatu; 103 all out (38.4 overs)
2009	(Papua New Guinea) PNG	Port Moresby	PNG; 276/8 (50 overs)	PNG won by 173 runs scorecard	Vanuatu; 103 all out (34.2 overs)
2011	Australia	Maroochydore	PNG; 8 points	PNG won on points table	Vanuatu; 6 points
2013	Australia	Maroochydore	PNG; 92 (36.4 overs)	PNG won by 45 runs scorecard	Vanuatu; 47 (27.4 overs)
2015	New Zealand	Blenheim	Fiji; 6 points	Fiji won on points table	PNG; 4 points
2017	Samoa	Apia	PNG; 11 points	PNG won on points table	Vanuatu; 5 points
2019	Japan	Sano	Japan; 8 points	Japan won on points table	PNG; 6 points
2023	Australia	Darwin	New Zealand; 12 points	New Zealand won on points table	Japan; 10 points
2025	Japan	Sano	Japan; 8 points	Japan won on points table	Fiji/PNG; 4/2 points

== Participating teams ==
Legend

- 1st – Champions
- 2nd – Runners-up
- 3rd – Third place
- Q – Qualified
- X – Qualified, but tournament cancelled
- * – Combined tournament with African members (not included in this table)
- — Hosts

Team	(Fiji) 2001	(Namibia) 2003*	(South Africa) 2005*	(Vanuatu) 2007	(Papua New Guinea) 2009	(Australia) 2011	(Australia) 2013	(New Zealand) 2015	(Samoa) 2017	(Japan) 2019	(Japan) 2021	(Australia) 2023	(Japan) 2025	Total
Hong Kong	2nd	Moved to Asian region												1
Fiji	3rd	8th	7th	3rd	3rd	4th	3rd	1st	3rd	5th	—	3rd	Q	12
Indonesia	—	—	—	—	4th	3rd	—	—	—	—	X	5th	—	3
Japan	—	—	—	4th	5th	5th	—	—	—	1st	X	2nd	1st	7
New Zealand	Automatic qualification											1st	AQ	1
Papua New Guinea	1st	1st	4th	1st	1st	1st	1st	2nd	1st	2nd	X	4th	Q	12
Samoa	—	—	—	—	—	—	4th	4th	4th	4th	—	6th	—	5
Vanuatu	—	—	—	2nd	2nd	2nd	2nd	3rd	2nd	3rd	X	7th	—	8

== Records ==
This section includes performances by EAP teams and players at the 2003 and 2005 combined Africa/EAP tournaments.

=== Highest team scores ===
- 440/8 (50 overs) – Fiji vs Japan, 20 July 2007, at Independence Park, Port Vila.
- 381/8 (50 overs) – Vanuatu vs Japan, 19 July 2007, at KaZaa Field, Port Vila.
- 340/9 (50 overs) – Papua New Guinea vs Hong Kong, 23 August 2001, at Nadi Muslim College, Nadi.
- 334 all out (49.2 overs) – Papua New Guinea vs Fiji, 19 August 2001, at Nadi Muslim College, Nadi.
- 307/7 (50 overs) – Papua New Guinea vs Indonesia, 1 June 2009, at Colt Grounds, Port Moresby.

=== Lowest team scores ===
- 23 all out (27.4 overs) – Japan vs Vanuatu, 7 February 2011, at Ron McMullin Oval, Maroochydore.
- 32 all out (15.1 overs) – Samoa vs Fiji, 2 July 2013, at John Blanck Oval, Maroochydore.
- 32 all out (21.2 overs) – Indonesia vs Papua New Guinea, 1 June 2009, at Colt Ground, Port Moresby.
- 34 all out (29 overs) – Japan vs Vanuatu, 19 July 2007, at KaZaa Field, Port Vila.
- 35 all out (24 overs) – Japan vs Fiji, 22 July 2007, at Club Hippique Adventure Park, Port Vila.

=== Highest individual scores ===
- 257 (145 balls) – (Fiji) Josefa Rika, vs Japan, 20 July 2007, at Independence Park, Port Vila.
- 157 (89 balls) – (Vanuatu) Andrew Mansale, vs Japan, 19 July 2007, at KaZaa Field, Port Vila.
- 142* (125 balls) – (Papua New Guinea) Mahuru Dai, vs Namibia, 8 October 2003, at Windhoek.
- 129 (156 balls) – (Fiji) Colin Rika, vs Hong Kong, 21 August 2001, at Nadi Muslim College, Nadi.
- 104* (84 balls) – (Papua New Guinea) Norbert Kunia, vs Nigeria, 23 August 2005, at Willowmoore Park, Benoni.

=== Best bowling figures ===
- 6/3 (10 overs) – (Vanuatu) Jaxies Samuel, vs Japan, 7 February 2011, at Ron McMullin Oval, Maroochydore.
- 6/13 (10 overs) – (Fiji) Sekope Biauniceva, vs Japan, 20 July 2007, at Independence Park, Port Vila.
- 6/25 (10 overs) – (Fiji) S. B. Tavokiti, vs Tanzania, 5 October 2003, at Trans Namib Ground, Windhoek.
- 5/5 (6 overs) – (Vanuatu) Andrew Mansale, vs Japan, 19 July 2007, at KaZaa Field, Port Vila.
- 5/7 (8 overs) – (Vanuatu) Patrick Matautaava, vs Fiji, 8 February 2011, at Kev Hackney Oval, Maroochydore.

== See also ==
- World Cricket League EAP region
- ICC U19 Cricket World Cup Asia Qualifier
- ICC U19 Cricket World Cup Europe Qualifier
- ICC U19 Cricket World Cup Africa Qualifier
- ICC U19 Cricket World Cup Americas Qualifier
