= 2015 EAP Under-19 Cricket Trophy =

- Dates: 24 – 28 February 2015
- Administrator: ICC East Asia-Pacific
- Cricket format: 50-over
- Host: New Zealand
- Champions: Fiji (1st title)
- Participants: 4
- Player of the series: (Fiji) Tadulala Veitacini
- Most runs: (Fiji) Delaimatuku Maraiwai (127)
- Most wickets: (Fiji) Tadulala Veitacini (13)

The 2015 EAP Under-19 Cricket Trophy was a cricket tournament held in Blenheim, New Zealand, from 24–28 February 2015. The tournament was the sixth edition of the EAP Under-19 Cricket Trophy, and the first to be held in New Zealand. All matches will be held at Horton Park.

The winner of the tournament, Fiji, qualified directly for the 2016 ICC Under-19 World Cup, to be played in Bangladesh. It was Fiji's first tournament win, and they consequently became only the second ICC East Asia-Pacific side to qualify for the World Cup, with Papua New Guinea having won all previous editions. Papua New Guinea defeated Vanuatu in a playoff to gain entry to the 2015 World Cup Qualifier, with the chance to gain the final spot at the World Cup. Two other East Asia-Pacific under-19 sides, Australia and New Zealand, are ICC full members, and thus qualified directly for the World Cup.

== Teams and qualification ==
Teams were unchanged from the 2013 tournament, played on Queensland's Sunshine Coast.

Team	Mode of qualification
Papua New Guinea	Champion of 2013 EAP Under-19 Cricket Trophy
Vanuatu	Runner-up in 2013 EAP Under-19 Cricket Trophy
Fiji	3rd place in 2013 EAP Under-19 Cricket Trophy
Samoa	4th place in 2013 EAP Under-19 Cricket Trophy

== Preparation ==
Fiji, along with Papua New Guinea the only side to have appeared at every EAP Under-19 Trophy, trained at Buckhurst Park, Suva, with Australian Shane Jurgensen serving as the team's coach for the tournament. The PNG under-19s, nicknamed the Garamuts after a type of slit drum, are to be coached by John Ovia, with assistance from New Zealander Dipak Patel, the coach of the country's senior side. PNG will be captained by Lou Toua, the brother of Olympic weightlifter Dika Toua. Samoa is to be coached by Uala Kaisara, a former Samoan national team player, while Vanuatu will be coached by Shane Deitz.

== Fixtures ==
The tournament incorporated a single round-robin, with each team playing the other once. Fixtures overlapped with the group stages of the 2015 Cricket World Cup, being hosted in Australia and New Zealand at the same time (Blenheim is not hosting any World Cup matches).

After the conclusion of the three-round round-robin, the second and third-place teams (Papua New Guinea and Vanuatu) played off for the right to progress to the 2015 Under-19 World Cup Qualifier. Papua New Guinea won the playoff by 69 runs. On the same day, the first and fourth-place teams (Fiji and Samoa) played a friendly match, which Fiji won by 154 runs. Neither of those matches is included in the table above.

== Points table ==
Team	Pld	W	L	T	NR	Pts
Fiji	3	3	0	0	0	6
Papua New Guinea	3	2	1	0	0	4
Vanuatu	3	1	2	0	0	2
Samoa	3	0	3	0	0	0

Source: CricHQ

== Statistics ==
=== Most runs ===
The top five run scorers (total runs) are included in this table.

Player	Team	Runs	Inns	Avg	Highest	100s	50s
Delaimatuku Maraiwai	Fiji	127	4	42.33	100	1	0
Vagi Guba	Papua New Guinea	108	4	36.00	79*	0	1
Peni Vuniwaqa	Fiji	94	2	47.00	73	0	1
Maxim Stephen	Vanuatu	89	4	22.25	51	0	1
Clement Tommy	Vanuatu	84	4	21.00	40	0	0

Source: CricHQ

=== Most wickets ===
The top five wicket takers, ranked by wickets taken and then by bowling average, are listed in this table.

Player	Team	Overs	Wkts	Ave	SR	Econ	BBI
Tadulala Veitacini	Fiji	26.2	13	6.38	12.15	3.15	5/18
William Aiga	Papua New Guinea	29.0	9	9.44	19.33	2.93	4/30
Sosiceni Weleilakeba	Fiji	18.0	8	7.50	13.50	3.33	4/17
Jack Dairi	Papua New Guinea	28.2	8	9.88	21.25	2.79	4/12
Lohia Guba	Papua New Guinea	21.5	8	7.63	15.63	2.93	4/11

Source: CricHQ
