= Fiji national under-19 cricket team =

Fiji Under-19s
- Association: Cricket Fiji

Personnel
- Captain: Saimoni Tuitoga
- Coach: Shane Jurgensen

International Cricket Council
- ICC region: East Asia-Pacific

International cricket
- First international: Fiji vs. Singapore (Hong Kong; 30 November 1997)
- As of 9 April 2016

The Fiji national under-19 cricket team represents the Republic of Fiji in international under-19 cricket. The team's first recorded match came at the 1997 Youth Asia Cup, but the majority of its matches have come in the EAP Under-19 Trophy, against other teams in the ICC East Asia-Pacific (EAP) region. Fiji won the 2015 edition of the tournament, and consequently qualified for the 2016 Under-19 World Cup, becoming the first team to qualify from the region after Papua New Guinea.

== History ==
Cricket has been played in Fiji since 1874, during the time of the Kingdom of Fiji, when British sailors aboard HMS Pearl introduced the sport to Levuka. It quickly became popular amongst the native Fijians, and the Fijian national side became regular visitors to Australia and New Zealand, playing a number of first-class matches. The Fiji Cricket Association gained associate membership of the International Cricket Council (ICC) in 1965, one of the first three countries to do so, along with Ceylon (now Sri Lanka) and the United States.

Organised under-19 international cricket dates only from the 1970s – the first under-19 Test and One Day International (ODI) were played in 1974 and 1976, respectively, while the first Under-19 World Cup was held in 1988. The Fijian under-19 side's first recorded matches came at the 1997 Youth Asia Cup, which was part of the qualification process for the 1998 World Cup. Their first game was a 134-run loss to Singapore, which was followed by nine-wicket losses to Papua New Guinea and Hong Kong.

Although both Fiji and Papua New Guinea had each recently left the Asian Cricket Council (ACC) to join the recently formed ICC East Asia-Pacific (EAP) organisation, they continued to participate in ACC tournaments for several years, as few EAP tournaments had yet been organised. Fiji did not participate at the 1999 Youth Asia Cup (the qualifier for the 2000 World Cup), but the following year hosted the inaugural edition of the EAP Under-19 Cricket Trophy. With Hong Kong and Papua New Guinea the only other participating teams, the tournament was played as a double round-robin, with Fiji winless from their four matches. However, in Fiji's first game against Hong Kong, Colin Rika score 129 runs opening the batting, the team's first recorded century, and a tournament record until surpassed by Vanuatu's Andrew Mansale at the 2007 tournament.

No standalone EAP qualifying tournament was held for the 2004 and 2006 World Cups, with two EAP teams (Fiji and Papua New Guinea) instead participating in a combined tournament with African Cricket Association teams. Fiji finished last at the 2003 combined tournament, hosted by Namibia, but did win their first competitive match, defeating Tanzania by two wickets. However, they had earlier lost their opening match against Kenya by 320 runs, conceding 356 runs before being bowled out for 36. At the 2005 combined tournament, Fiji lost all its group matches, but defeated Nigeria by two wickets in the eighth-place playoff, having bowled them out for 46.

The 2007 EAP Under-19 Trophy, the first since 2001, included Japan and Vanuatu for the first time, and Fiji were consequently able to win their first match against another EAP side. In their first innings against Japan (playing only its third recorded under-19 match), Fiji scored 440/8 from its 50 overs, with their captain, Josefa Rika, scoring 257 runs from 147 balls, including 37 fours and 9 sixes. They then dismissed Japan for 53 runs, winning the match by 387 runs. Sekope Biauniceva took 6/13, and both he and Rika's performances remain Fiji under-19 records. A writer for Cricinfo described Rika's innings as "what must rank as one of the most breathtaking knocks in the history of age-group cricket".

== Tournament history ==
=== Youth Asia Cup ===
- 1997: group stages

=== EAP Under-19 Trophy ===
- 2001: 3rd place (3 teams) – hosts
- 2007: 3rd place (4 teams)
- 2009: 3rd place (5 teams)
- 2011: 4th place (5 teams)
- 2013: 3rd place (4 teams)
- 2015: 1st place (4 teams)

=== ICC Africa/EAP Under-19 Championship ===
- 2003: 8th place (8 teams)
- 2005: 7th place (8 teams)

=== ICC Under-19 World Cup ===
Fiji's U19 World Cup record
| Year | Result | Pos | № | Pld | W | L | T | NR |
|---|---|---|---|---|---|---|---|---|
| (Australia) 1988 | Did not enter | | | | | | | |
| (South Africa) 1998 | Did not enter | | | | | | | |
| (Sri Lanka) 2000 | Did not enter | | | | | | | |
| (New Zealand) 2002 | Did not qualify | | | | | | | |
| (Bangladesh) 2004 | Did not qualify | | | | | | | |
| (Sri Lanka) 2006 | Did not qualify | | | | | | | |
| (Malaysia) 2008 | Did not qualify | | | | | | | |
| (New Zealand) 2010 | Did not qualify | | | | | | | |
| (Australia) 2012 | Did not qualify | | | | | | | |
| (United Arab Emirates) 2014 | Did not qualify | | | | | | | |
| (Bangladesh) 2016 | First round | 16th | 16 | 6 | 0 | 6 | 0 | 0 |
| (New Zealand) 2018 | Did not qualify | | | | | | | |
| (South Africa) 2020 | Did not qualify | | | | | | | |
| Total | | | | 6 | 0 | 6 | 0 | 0 |

== Team records ==
Last updated 8 February 2016.

Highest team scores

- 440/8 (50 overs), vs. Japan, 20 July 2007, at Independence Park, Port Vila.
- 294/7 (50 overs), vs. Samoa, 28 February 2015, at Horton Park, Blenheim.
- 222/9 (50 overs), vs. Hong Kong, 21 August 2001, at Nadi Muslim College, Nadi.
- 190/9 (50 overs), vs. Indonesia, 10 February 2011, at Ron McMullin Oval, Maroochydore.
- 171 (31.3 overs), vs. Scotland, 24 January 2016, at Fatullah Osmani Stadium, Fatullah.

Lowest team scores

- 36 (18 overs), vs. Kenya, 4 October 2003, at Police Sports Club, Windhoek.
- 49 (30.4 overs), vs. South Africa, 22 January 2016, at Fatullah Osmani Stadium, Fatullah.
- 54 (26.1 overs), vs. Vanuatu, 3 July 2013, at John Blanck Oval, Maroochydore.
- 62 (24 overs), vs. Papua New Guinea, 22 August 2001, at Nadi Muslim College, Nadi.
- 63 (33.2 overs), vs Papua New Guinea, 7 February 2011, at John Blanck Oval, Maroochydore.

Highest individual scores

- 257 (145 balls) – Joseph Rika, vs. Japan, 20 July 2007, at Independence Park, Port Vila.
- 129 (156 balls) – Colin Rika, vs. Hong Kong, 21 August 2001, at Nadi Muslim College, Nadi.
- 100 (92 balls) – Delaimatuku Maraiwai, vs. Samoa, 28 February 2015, at Horton Park, Blenheim.
- 89* (89 balls) – Noa Acawei, vs. Indonesia, 10 February 2011, at Ron McMullin Oval, Maroochydore.
- 80 (123 balls) – Peni Vuniwaqa, vs. Scotland, 8 February 2016, at Sheikh Kamal International Stadium, Cox's Bazar.

Best individual bowling performances

- 6/13 (10 overs) – Sekope Biauniceva, vs. Japan, 20 July 2007, at Independence Park, Port Vila.
- 6/25 (10 overs) – S. B. Takoviti, vs. Tanzania, 5 October 2003, at Trans Namib Ground, Windhoek.
- 6/34 (? overs) – Simon Jepsen, vs. Singapore, 30 November 1997, at Diocesan Boys' School, Hong Kong.
- 6/59 (10 overs) – Cakacaka Tikoisuva, vs. West Indies, 31 January 2016, at M. A. Aziz Stadium, Chittagong.
- 5/18 (6 overs) – Tadulala Veitacini, vs. Samoa, 28 February 2015, at Horton Park, Blenheim.

== Current squad ==
| Player | Date of birth | Batting | Bowling style |
|---|---|---|---|
| Saimoni Tuitoga (c) | 27 April 1997 (aged 18) | Right | Right-arm medium-fast |
| Josaia Baleicikoibia | 30 June 1997 (aged 18) | Right | Right-arm medium |
| Petero Cabebula | 19 January 1999 (aged 17) | Right | Right-arm medium |
| Jack Charters | 20 April 1999 (aged 16) | Right | Right-arm fast |
| Malakai Cokovaki | 8 November 1998 (aged 17) | Right | Right-arm medium |
| Jordan Dunham | 12 September 1997 (aged 18) | Right | Right-arm medium |
| Vaibhav Kapadia | 6 February 1998 (aged 17) | Right | Right-arm off break |
| Delaimatuku Maraiwai | 22 May 1997 (aged 18) | Right | — |
| Ledua Qionivoka | 2 August 1997 (aged 18) | Right | Right-arm medium |
| Samuel Saunokonoko | 27 January 1998 (aged 18) | Right | — |
| Cakacaka Tikoisuva | 31 May 1997 (aged 18) | Right | Right-arm medium |
| Peni Vuniwaqa | 29 September 1997 (aged 18) | Right | Right-arm medium |
| Sosiceni Weleilakeba | 21 September 1997 (aged 18) | Right | Right-arm medium |
| Tuwai Yabaki | 1 January 2000 (aged 16) | Right | Right-arm off break |
