= List of Gambia women Twenty20 International cricketers =

This is a list of Gambia women Twenty20 International cricketers. A Women's Twenty20 International (WT20I) is an international cricket match between two representative teams. A T20I is played under the rules of Twenty20 cricket. In April 2018, the International Cricket Council (ICC) granted full international status to Twenty20 women's matches played between member sides from 1 July 2018 onwards. Gambia women played their first WT20I on 29 March 2022 against Nigeria during the 2022 Nigeria Invitational Women's T20I Tournament in Lagos.

The list is arranged in the order in which each player won her first Twenty20 cap. Where more than one player won her first Twenty20 cap in the same match, those players are listed alphabetically by surname.

== Key ==
General

- ‡ – Captain
- † – Wicket-keeper
- First – Year of debut
- Last – Year of latest game
- Mat – Number of matches played

Batting

- Runs – Runs scored in career
- HS – Highest score
- Avg – Runs scored per dismissal
- * – Batsman remained not out
- 50 – Number of half centuries

Bowling

- Balls – Balls bowled in career
- Wkt – Wickets taken in career
- BBI – Best bowling in an innings
- Ave – Average runs per wicket

Fielding

- Ca – Catches taken
- St – Stumpings affected

== Players ==
Statistics are correct as of 2 April 2022.

Gambia women T20I cricketers
General					Batting				Bowling				Fielding		Ref
No.	Name	First	Last	Mat	Runs	HS	Avg	50	Balls	Wkt	BBI	Ave	Ca	St	Ref
1	Awa Bobb	2022	2022	3	8	8	2.66	0	12	0	–	–	0	0	
2	Hawa Badjie	2022	2022	4	12	6*	6.00	0	–	–	–	–	0	0	
3	Kumba Bah	2022	2022	4	0	0	0.00	0	48	1	1/11	60.00	1	0	
4	Fatou Ceesay†	2022	2022	2	0	0	0.00	0	–	–	–	–	0	0	
5	Secka Dibba	2022	2022	3	1	1	1.00	0	30	0	–	–	0	0	
6	Fatou Faye‡	2022	2022	3	5	3	1.66	0	6	1	1/10	10.00	0	0	
7	Marie Mendy	2022	2022	3	0	0	0.00	0	–	–	–	–	0	0	
8	Marie Sambou	2022	2022	4	10	9	2.50	0	–	–	–	–	0	0	
9	Maimuna Sano‡	2022	2022	3	3	2	1.50	0	41	0	–	–	2	0	
10	Fatoumata Singhateh	2022	2022	4	17	7	4.25	0	41	2	1/11	25.50	0	0	
11	Haddy Wally†	2022	2022	4	2	1	0.50	0	6	0	–	–	0	0	
12	Catherine Mendy	2022	2022	3	24	12	8.00	0	–	–	–	–	0	0	
13	Sosseh Sano	2022	2022	2	2	2*	2.00	0	24	3	3/28	9.33	0	0	
14	Tida Kassama	2022	2022	2	2	2	1.00	0	–	–	–	–	0	0	
