= Burkina Faso national cricket team =

Burkina Faso
- Flag of Burkina Faso
- Association: Cricket Burkina Faso

Personnel
- Coach: (Burkina Faso) Sore Daouda
- Chairman: (Burkina Faso) Ibrahim Ndiaye

International Cricket Council
- ICC status: Non-ICC member
- ICC region: Africa
- As of 2 January 2025

The Burkina Faso national cricket team is the team that represents Burkina Faso in international men's cricket. They are not a member of the International Cricket Council (ICC) and have not played any international matches yet.

Established relatively recently, the team is working towards gaining recognition and establishing a stronger presence in the sport within a country where football overwhelmingly dominates the sports scene.

== History ==
Cricket in Burkina Faso began in the early 21st century, introduced by Indian expatriates in Ouagadougou.

The Burkina Faso Cricket Association (CBF) oversees the sport’s development, organizing local matches and seeking ICC recognition. About 10 clubs, mostly in the capital, involve 68 regular and 225 total players.

CBF aims to make cricket a top 10 sport by 2026 through grassroots programs and social media.

Limited equipment forces players to improvise bats and wickets, while football’s dominance poses a challenge. Domestic club matches in Ouagadougou drive interest, with plans for a formal league.

The national team, not yet an ICC affiliate, has played friendly matches with Côte d'Ivoire and seeks Associate Membership for more resources and international opportunities.

Burkina Faso has yet to form a national cricket team but are planning to apply for ICC membership by December 2025.
