= Austrian Cricket Association =

Sports governing body in Austria

- Sport: Cricket
- Jurisdiction: Austria
- Founded: 1981
- Affiliation: International Cricket Council
- Regional affiliation: ICC Europe

Official website
- austriacricket.at
- (Austria)

The Austrian Cricket Association (Österreichischer Cricket Verband) is the national governing body of cricket in Austria. It was founded in 1981 by Kerry Tattersall as the Austrian Cricketers Association, following the re-introduction of cricket to Austria in 1975 with the founding of Vienna Cricket Club – as 1. Vienna Cricket Verein. Cricket was recorded as being played in Vienna as far back as the 1890s, traditionally by gardeners of mercantile families. During the post-war occupation of Austria, cricket was also played by Allied forces members. Since 2017, the Austrian Cricket Association has been an associate member of the International Cricket Council, and it is one of the founding members of the European Cricket Council. The European Cricket Council, now succeeded by ICC Europe, is responsible for the administration of the ICC's European Development Program.

== Executive committee ==
The executive committee of the ACA is elected every two years and usually consists of three elected members all of which are volunteer workers.

=== Current executive committee ===
Name	Position
Mohammad Bilal ZALMAI	Chairman
Lakhvir HIRA	Secretary
Mehar Partap S. CHEEMA	Treasurer

=== List of chairmen of the Austrian Cricket Association ===
From	To	Chairman
1996	March 2005	Andrew Simpson-Parker
March 2005	April 2008	Michael Bailey
May 2008	June 2009	Marcel Biersteker
June 2009	January 2013	Naresh Laddha
January 2013	February 2014	Hammad Hassan
March 2014	February 2024	Muhammad Ashfaq
February 2024		Mohammad Bilal ZALMAI

=== List of secretaries of the Austrian Cricket Association ===
From	To	Secretary
March 2002	March 2005	Michael Bailey
March 2006	March 2007	Sandeep Khanna
May 2008	June 2009	
June 2009	February 2014	Thomas Pühringer
March 2014	March 2018	Wolfgang Tesar
March 2018		Lakhvir HIRA

== Member clubs ==
The association's members are 13 cricket clubs, each holding a single vote, with clubs having to be registered with the Austrian Vereinspolizei. Currently there are clubs from four of Austria's 9 federal provinces: Whilst the majority of clubs are based in Vienna, there are also clubs in Graz, Salzburg, Steyr and Velden.

=== List of current member clubs ===
- ASKÖ CC Steyr (ASCC)
- Austria Cricket Club Wien (ACC Wien)
- Austrian Cricket Tigers (ACT
- Austrian Daredevils Cricket Club (ADCC)
- Vienna Gladiators Cricket Club (VGCC)
- Bangladesh Cricket Club (BCC)
- Riders Cricket Club (RCC)
- Vienna Afghan Cricket Club (VACC)
- Cricket Club Velden '91 (CCV91)
- Five Continents Cricket Club (FCCC)
- Graz Cricket Club (GCC)
- Lords Cricket Club (LCC)
- Pakistan Cricket Club (PCC)
- Pakistan Falken Cricket Club (PFCC)
- Salzburg Cricket Club (SCC)
- Sri Lankan Cricket Club (SLCC)
- SNASY
- United Nations Cricket Club (UNCC)
- Vienna Cricket Club (VCC)

=== List of former member clubs ===
- Graz Cricket Club (GCC)
- Pakistan United Cricket Club (PUCC)
- Sri Lankan Sports Club (SLSC)
- St Pölten Cricket Club (SPCC)
- Vienna Lions Cricket Club (VLCC)

== Competitions organised ==
The Austrian Cricket Association is responsible amongst other duties for the administration of organised cricket competitions in Austria, with the ACA Open League perceived to be its premier competition. In 2008 the ACA Trophy, which had been a 40 over knockout tournament, and which had been geographically split since 2002 was replaced with a 20 overs competition, with a development remit.

=== ACA Open League ===
The ACA Open League is a single innings league, and in 2006 was split into two parallel conferences (Austrian Conference and National Conference) to allow more teams to enter the league. The top three teams of each conference qualified for the Super Sixes stage, with the top two contesting a final to decide the Open League Champions. Teams not qualifying for the Super Sixes stage played in localised plate competitions – the Viennese Plate and the Southern Plate.

The league is played as a 50 overs tournament, with the exception of 2009, where due to difficulties in scheduling the League due to the unavailability of Austria CC Wien's ground in the Markomannenstrasse, it has been necessary to reduce the competition to a 35 overs format to ensure that the competition can be played to a conclusion. In 2008 logistical issues had meant that the parallel conference system was in abeyance, with a regionalised structure (a Vienna group and a non-Vienna group) with a knock-out stage for the top 6 Viennese teams joined by the top 2 from the non-Vienna group. The 2008 Open League champions were Pakistan CC, retaining the title they had won in 2007.

The first winners of the Open League since its split into parallel conferences was Vienna Lions CC in 2006, defeating Five Continents CC in the final played in September 2006 in Seebarn. United Nations CC won the Viennese Plate competition, with CC Velden '91 winning the Southern Plate competition.

==== ACA Open League Champions and Runners-up 1991–2018 ====
Year	Open League Champions	Open League Runners-Up
1991	Concordia CC	Vienna CC
1992	Vienna CC	Concordia CC
1993	Concordia CC	Vienna CC
1994	Pakistan CC	Vienna CC
1995	Pakistan CC	Vienna CC
1996	Concordia CC	Pakistan CC
1997	Lords CC	
1998	Lords CC	
1999	Lords CC	
2000	Lords CC	United Nations CC
2001	Concordia CC	Pakistan Falken CC
2002	Pakistan Falken CC	Pakistan CC
2003	Concordia CC	Five Continents CC
2004	Vienna CC	Austria CC Wien
2005	Austria CC Wien	Pakistan CC
2006	Vienna Lions CC	Five Continents CC
2007	Pakistan CC	Salzburg CC
2008	Pakistan CC	Austria CC Wien
2009	Pakistan CC	Vienna CC
2010	Pakistan CC	Lords CC
2011	Pakistan Cricket Wien	Vienna CC
2012	Austria CC Wien	Vienna Lions CC
2013	Pakistan CC	Austria CC Wien
2014	Austria CC Wien	Vienna CC
2015	Vienna CC	
2016	Pakistan CC	Lords CC
2017	ACT	ICCV
2018	Vienna CC	Lords CC

Champions:

8: Concordia CC/Austria CC Wien 7: Pakistan CC 4: Lords CC 2: Vienna CC 1: Pakistan Falken CC, Vienna Lions CC, Pakistan Cricket Wien

=== ACA Trophy ===
Pakistan CC were the last winners of the ACA Trophy (North), in 2007, defeating reigning ACA Trophy (North) holders Vienna Lions CC in the final in Seebarn. Vienna Lions CC had won the 2006 ACA Trophy (North). The competition was split into two tournaments (North and South) in 2002, with Salzburg CC having dominated the ACA Trophy (South).

==== ACA Trophy Champions and Runners-Up ====
Year	Champions	Runners up
2000	Vienna CC	Pakistan CC
2001	Pakistan CC	Vienna CC
2002	N: Lords CC; S: Salzburg CC	N: Five Continents CC; S: Ljubljana CC
2003	N: Pakistan CC; S: Salzburg CC	N: Concordia CC; S: Ljubljana CC
2004	N: Austria CC Wien; S: in abeyance	N: Sri Lankan CC; S: in abeyance
2005	N: Austria CC Wien; S: Salzburg CC	N: Lords CC; S: Graz CC
2006	N: Vienna Lions CC	N:
2007	N: Pakistan CC	N: Vienna Lions CC

=== ACA Twenty20 tournament ===
The inaugural Twenty20 tournament was contested by five teams in Vienna in 2008, with Pakistan CC defeating Pakistan Falken CC in the final to become champions. In 2009, United Nations CC defeated the reigning champions to win the second Twenty20 tournament, contested by six clubs. In 2010 the tournament was contested by 7 teams. In 2011 the competition split into two groups due to demand for the competition, although in 2012 the nine teams in the tournament played in a single group again. A plate competition was introduced to ensure extra cricket for sides eliminated in the group stage of the competition.

==== ACA Twenty20 Champions 2008–present ====
Season	Winner	Runner-up	Plate Winners	Plate Runner-up	Participating teams
2008	Pakistan CC	Pakistan Falken CC	–	–	5
2009	United Nations CC	Pakistan CC	–	–	6
2010	Pakistan CC	Pakistan Falken CC	–	–	7
2011	Vienna Lions CC	Pakistan CC	United Nations CC	Vienna CC	12
2012					9
2013					9
2014	Afghan Steiermark CC	Austrian Cricket Tigers			13*

== Austrian national team ==
The Austrian national team is open to players who are qualified to play for Austria under the International Cricket Council's qualification criteria and fulfil a nationality and development criteria. The Austrian national team made its competitive début in 1990 in Guernsey and played regularly until 2003. In 2006 the national team was revived, playing two international matches against the Czech Republic.

The team's return to competitive cricket was to ICC Europe's European Championships Division 4, held in Cyprus in September 2009, with the team finishing third after wins against Luxembourg, Cyprus, Slovenia and Finland and a loss against Switzerland.

== See also ==
- List of International Cricket Council members
- Cricket in Austria
- Austria national cricket team
- Austria women's national cricket team
- Austria women's national under-19 cricket team
- Austria national under-19 cricket team
