= Mozambican Cricket Association =

- Sport: Cricket
- Founded: 2001
- Affiliation: International Cricket Council
- Affiliation date: 2003
- Regional affiliation: Africa
- Location: Maputo, Mozambique

Official website
- www.cricketmozambique.org
- (Mozambique)

The Mozambican Cricket Association (Portuguese: Associação Moçambicana de Cricket; AMC) is the official governing body of the sport of cricket in Mozambique. Its current headquarters is in Maputo, Mozambique. The association is Mozambique's representative at the International Cricket Council and is an associate member and has been a member of that body since 2003. It is also a member of the African Cricket Association.

== History ==
Organised cricket was popularised in Mozambique by Indian and Pakistani members of the United Nations Operation in Mozambique, established in the aftermath of the Mozambican Civil War. In 1995, the Indian embassy established an annual cricket tournament. Cricket enthusiasts, together with local government officials, then petitioned ICC regional development manager Hoosain Ayob to visit the country in 1999 and 2000. The Mozambican Cricket Association was formed in 2001 and recognised by the national government, with the official launch on 9 March 2002. Mozambique was unanimously elected as an affiliate member of the ICC in 2003.

== See also ==
- Mozambique national cricket team
- Mozambique women's national cricket team
