= Cuban Cricket Commission =

Cuban Cricket Commission is the official governing body of the sport of cricket in Cuba. Its current headquarters is in Havana, Cuba. The commission was granted affiliate membership of the International Cricket Council (ICC) in 2002, but had its membership revoked in 2013 for failing to "demonstrate a suitable administrative structure to conduct its affairs" under ICC guidelines. The organisation has previously been invited to field teams in ICC Americas-sanctioned tournaments (most notably the 2010 ICC Americas Championship Division Four), but it is unclear if it (is or) was a member of that association.
