= David Richards (cricket administrator) =

Australian cricket administrator

David Richards OAM

Chief Executive International Cricket Council
- In office 1993–2001
- Preceded by: Office Established
- Succeeded by: Malcolm Speed

David Richards is an Australian cricket administrator. He was CEO of the Australian Cricket Board from 1980 to 1993, and CEO of the International Cricket Council from 1993 to 2001.
