= Tonga Cricket Association =

Official governing body of the sport of cricket in Tonga

Coordinates: 21.1335°S 175.2777°W

Tonga Cricket Association is the official governing body of the sport of cricket in Tonga. Its current headquarters is in Nukuʻalofa, Tonga. Tonga Cricket Association was Tonga's representative at the International Cricket Council (ICC) and was an affiliate member and has been a member of that body since 2000. It is also a member of the East Asia-Pacific Cricket Council. The ICC has suspended the Tonga Cricket Association in September 2013 because it failed to obey ICC rules and regulations despite being warned.
