= Gambia Cricket Association =

Cricket Governing Body in Gambia

Gambia Cricket Association is the official governing body of the sport of cricket in the Gambia and operates the Gambia national cricket team. Its current headquarters is in Banjul, Gambia. It is Gambia's representative at the International Cricket Council and is an associate member and has been a member of that body since 2002. It is also a member of the African Cricket Association.
