= 2001 EAP Under-19 Cricket Trophy =

- Dates: 19 – 25 August 2001
- Administrator(s): ICC East Asia-Pacific
- Cricket format: 50-over
- Tournament format(s): Round-robin, then final
- Host(s): Fiji
- Champions: Papua New Guinea (1st title)
- Participants: 3
- Matches: 7
- Most runs: (Papua New Guinea) Frank Joseph (206)
- Most wickets: (Papua New Guinea) Greg Baeau (13)

The 2001 EAP Under-19 Cricket Trophy was a cricket tournament held in Fiji from 19–25 August 2001, during the 2001 international season. All matches were held in Nadi.

Papua New Guinea won the tournament by defeating Hong Kong in the final, thus qualifying for the 2002 Under-19 World Cup in New Zealand. Two PNG players, Frank Joseph and Greg Baeau, led the tournament in runs and wickets, respectively. The only century at the tournament was scored by a Fijian, Colin Rika.

The tournament, featuring only three teams, was organised by ICC East Asia-Pacific (EAP), and was the inaugural edition of the EAP Under-19 Trophy. Previously, EAP teams had had to qualify via the Youth Asia Cup, an Asian Cricket Council (ACC) tournament. For the next two World Cups, in 2004 and 2006, the EAP organised joint qualification tournaments with the African Cricket Association, held in 2003 and 2005. Separate qualifying tournaments have been held since then.

== Teams and qualification ==
Hong Kong, an Asian Cricket Council (ACC) member, participated in the tournament for the first and only time.

Team	Qualification
Fiji	Host (automatically qualified)
Hong Kong	Automatically qualified
Papua New Guinea	Automatically qualified

== Round-robin ==
Qualified for the final

Team	Pld	W	L	T	NR	Pts	NRR
Papua New Guinea	4	4	0	0	0	8	+4.823
Hong Kong	4	2	2	0	0	4	–0.772
Fiji	4	0	4	0	0	0	–4.264

Full fixtures: Cricket Archive

== Final ==
25 August
Scorecard

Hong Kong; 119 (41 overs)	v	Papua New Guinea; 121/1 (12.2 overs)
Jignesh Tailor 26 (42); Greg Baeau 2/20 (8 overs)		Mahuru Dai 76* (44); Jignesh Tailor 1/15 (1 over)

PNG under-19s won by 9 wickets.
Nadi Muslim College, Nadi
Umpires: Tony Cooper (Aus) and Daryl Harper (Aus)

- Hong Kong won the toss and elected to bat.
- Papua New Guinea won the Championship. Papua New Guinea qualified for the 2002 Under-19 World Cup.

== Statistics ==
=== Most runs ===
The top five run scorers are included in this table, ranked by runs scored and then by batting average.

Player	Team	Runs	Inns	Avg	Highest	100s	50s
Frank Joseph	PNG	206	5	51.50	77	0	2
Mahuru Dai	PNG	181	5	60.33	76*	0	2
Colin Rika	Fiji	163	2	81.50	129	1	0
Dyutish Chaudhuri	Hong Kong	162	5	32.40	63	0	2
Jignesh Tailor	Hong Kong	140	4	46.66	63*	0	1

Source: CricketArchive

=== Most wickets ===
The top five wicket takers are listed in this table, ranked by wickets taken and then by bowling average.

Player	Team	Overs	Wkts	Ave	SR	Econ	BBI
Greg Baeau	PNG	31.5	13	7.61	14.69	3.10	5/37
Gima Keimolo	PNG	47.3	12	10.33	23.75	2.61	5/22
Peter Arua	PNG	42.5	9	15.77	28.55	3.31	4/30
Kieran Kumaria	Hong Kong	8.4	5	9.40	10.40	5.42	5/20
Kohu Dai	PNG	32.0	5	19.60	38.40	3.06	3/41

Source: CricketArchive
