= St Helena Cricket Association =

- Sport: Cricket
- Founded: 1903
- Affiliation: International Cricket Council
- Affiliation date: 2001
- Regional affiliation: Africa
- Location: Saint Helena

Official website
- sthelenacricket.org
- (Saint Helena)

St Helena Cricket Association (SHCA) is the official governing body of the sport of cricket in the British Overseas Territory of St Helena. Its current headquarters is located in Jamestown, St Helena. The association is St Helena's representative at the International Cricket Council, is an associate member, and has been a member of that body since 2001. It is also a member of the African Cricket Association.

The SHCA was established in 1903, with the history of cricket on the island dating back to the mid-19th century. Due to the island's remoteness, the St Helena cricket team did not make its international debut until 2012, playing an ICC qualifier in South Africa that required a five-day journey by boat. The team has been able to make more regular appearances since Saint Helena Airport opened in 2016. As of 2022, the local cricket season runs from December to May and includes three different tournaments and a district league. The Francis Plain Playing Field is the sole cricket ground on the island, featuring a concrete square covered in matting rather than a traditional turf wicket.
