= Francis Plain Playing Field =

African multi-use sporting venue

Coordinates: 15°57′0.3252″S 5°42′51.5625″W

- Interactive map of Francis Plain Playing Field
- Location: Francis Plain, Saint Helena
- Owner: N/A
- Capacity: 2,000

Construction
- Opened: 1970

Tenants
- Saint Helena national football team Saint Helena Cricket Association

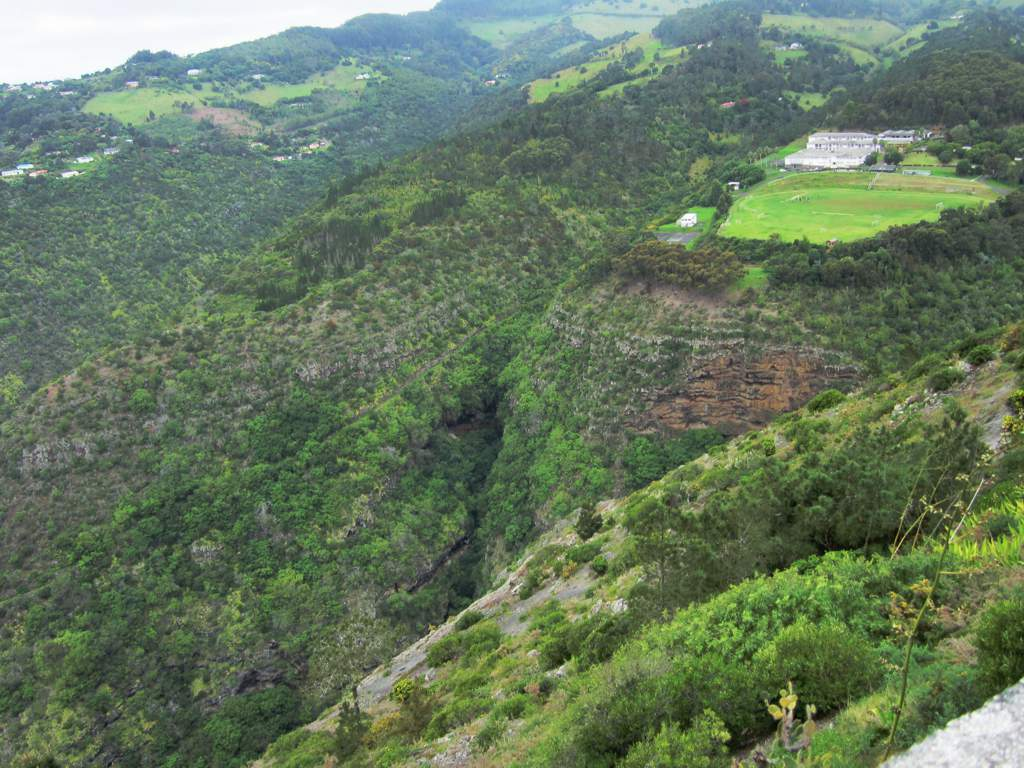

Francis Plain Playing Field is a multi-use sporting venue in Francis Plain, Saint Helena. The ground holds 2,000 and was built in 1970. It is used for cricket and football.

The Saint Helena Cricket Association (SHCA) utilises Francis Plain during the local cricket season, which runs from December to May and includes a district league and three different tournaments. The cricket pitch is concrete overlaid with matting, rather than a traditional turf wicket.
