= 2009 EAP Under-19 Cricket Trophy =

The 2009 EAP Under-19 Cricket Trophy was a cricket tournament organised by the EAP for Under-19 teams from its member nations. The event also served as qualification for the 2009 Under-19 World Cup Qualifier. Five teams took part in the tournament, which was held from 30 May-8 June in Port Moresby, Papua New Guinea. Papua New Guinea, won the tournament with runner-up Vanuatu joining them in qualification.

== Teams ==
- Fiji
- Indonesia
- Japan
- Papua New Guinea
- Vanuatu

== Matches ==
The teams played one another on a round-robin basis. The teams were then ranked based on number of wins.

== Results ==
Pos.	Team	Result
1	Papua New Guinea	Qualify for 2009 U-19 World Cup Qualifier
2	Vanuatu	Qualify for 2009 U-19 World Cup Qualifier
3	Fiji	
4	Japan	
5	Indonesia	
