= Peni Vuniwaqa =

Fijian cricketer

Personal information
- Full name: Peni Volavola Vuniwaqa
- Born: 29 September 1997 (age 29)
- Batting: Right-handed
- Bowling: Right-arm medium pace
- Role: Batter

International information
- National side: Fiji
- T20I debut (cap 10): 9 September 2022 v Vanuatu
- Last T20I: 18 May 2026 v Philippines
- Source: Cricinfo, 19 September 2025

Peni Volavola Vuniwaqa (born 29 September 1997) is a Fijian cricketer who currently captains the Fiji national cricket team. He played for the country in 2016 Under-19 Cricket World Cup.

== Background ==
Vuniwaqa is from Lau Island, where cricket is the most popular sport, and produced 90% of the country's cricketers. He along with many other cricketers in the island, were inspired to play cricket through former Fijian President Kamisese Mara, who played first-class cricket for Fiji. He preferred cricket over rugby due to "lower chances of injury".

== Career ==
In 2013, Vuniwaqa heard about trials at Suva, but his parents were reluctant to send him on a 3-day boat journey to the trials. On one of the days, Vuniwaqa slept on toilet of the boat. He had then successfully undergone the trials, and agreed to play cricket beyond Under-19s when asked.

His career began for Fiji Under-19 with the 2015 EAP Under-19 Cricket Trophy, where he scored 73 on debut against Papua New Guinea, who played seven Under-19 World Cups previously. Fiji won the qualifier and entered the Under-19 World Cup, which was their first-ever major ICC event. He was Fiji's leading run-scorer in the 2016 Under-19 World Cup in Bangladesh, with 160 runs from six matches. He top-scored for Fiji against England, West Indies and Scotland while had their best bowling figures against Afghanistan. Vuniwaqa scored 80 off 123 balls against Scotland, which is Fiji's only fifty-plus knock in Under-19 World Cup history, and their highest score in overall Under-19 cricket.

He played for Fiji in the 2018 ICC T20 World Cup East Asia-Pacific Qualifier-A. He made his Twenty20 International debut for Fiji in the 2022 ICC Men's T20 World Cup East Asia-Pacific Qualifier-A against Vanuatu, in Fiji's first ever matches with official T20I status. In the next match, he scored 72* off 39 balls against Cook Islands, followed by 68 off 46 balls against Samoa in the following match. These are the first two half-centuries for Fiji in Twenty20 Internationals, and their top-2 highest scores in this format. The match against Samoa was Fiji's first win in Twenty20 Internationals, and he won Fiji's first Player of the Match award in this format.

His maiden captaincy stint with Fiji was in the 2023 Pacific Island Cricket Challenge, where John Wesele was originally named as the captain but withdrew. He also captained them in the 2024 ICC Men's T20 World Cup East Asia-Pacific Qualifier-A.
