= Tajikistan national cricket team =

Tajikistan Men's Cricket Team

Tajikistan
- Flag of Tajikistan
- Association: Tajikistan Cricket Federation

Personnel
- Captain: Ahmadshah Ahmadi

International Cricket Council
- ICC status: Associate member (2021)
- ICC region: Asia

International cricket
- First international: 27 December 2013 v Afghanistan A at Ghazi Amanullah International Cricket Stadium, Jalalabad, Afghanistan
- As of 4 January 2023

The Tajikistan national cricket team represents the country of Tajikistan in international cricket. It is administered by the Tajikistan Cricket Federation. Tajikistan has been a member of Asian Cricket Council since 2024. They were granted associate status by the International Cricket Council (ICC) in July 2021.

In April 2018, the ICC decided to grant full Twenty20 International (T20I) status to all its members. Therefore, all Twenty20 matches played between the Tajikistan and other ICC members after 1 January 2019 will be a full T20I.

== History ==
The Tajikistan national team played three One Days and two T20s in Afghanistan in May 2013 and a reciprocal tour by a team from Afghanistan was staged in Tajikistan in June 2013.

Tajikistan's men's national team toured Afghanistan in December 2013, playing two 40 over matches and one 20 over match versus Afghanistan A.

=== Associate membership (2021–present) ===
On 16 July 2021, Tajikistan became an Associate member of the ICC along with Switzerland and Mongolia.

Tajikistan was granted provisional membership of the Asian Cricket Council in January 2024, subject to an evaluation visit to determine their eligibility for permanent status.

== Team colours ==
The team wore yellow coloured kit with a red outline during their tour of Afghanistan in December 2013.

== Head coaches ==
- (Afghanistan) Naim Ubed (2012-present)

== Squad ==
The Tajik squad that toured Afghanistan A in December 2013.

- Ahmad Shah Ahmadi (c)
- Murad Ali (wk)
- Muhammad Nadeem
- Mohammad Nawab
- Sohbat Khan
- Abeshak Sharma
- Aref
- Zia ul Haq
- Mohammad Monawaar
- Nafiz Abbasi
- Sudir Komar

== Records ==
=== Limited-overs records ===
Last updated: 7 March 2014

Opponent	M	W	L	T
Afghanistan A	2	0	2	0
Total	2	0	2	0

- Highest team total: 171/7 v. Afghanistan A, 29 December 2013 at Jalalabad
- Highest individual score: 53, Muhammad Nadeem v. Afghanistan A, 29 December 2013 at Jalalabad
- Best bowling figures in an innings: 4/29, Zia ul Haq v. Afghanistan A, 27 December 2013 at Jalalabad

=== T20 records ===
Last updated: 7 March 2014

Opponent	M	W	L	T
Afghanistan A	1	0	1	0
Total	1	0	1	0

- Highest team total: 137/6 v. Afghanistan A, 31 December 2013 at Jalalabad
- Highest individual score: 86, Murad Ali v. Afghanistan A, 31 December 2013 at Jalalabad
- Best bowling figures in an innings: 3/24, Ahmad Shah Ahmadi v. Afghanistan A, 31 December 2013 at Jalalabad
