= Burundi national cricket team =

Cricket team

Burundi
- Flag of Burundi
- Association: Burundi Cricket Federation

International Cricket Council
- ICC status: Non-member
- ICC region: Africa
- As of 10 January 2024

The Burundi national cricket team is the team that represents Burundi in international men's cricket. They are not a member of the International Cricket Council (ICC) and have not played any international matches yet.

== History ==
The sports association for cricket in Burundi is the Burundi Cricket Federation which was established and approved to conduct and carry on cricket activities in Burundi by the Burundi Ministry for Sports on January 13, 2023.

Burundi has yet to form a national cricket team but are planning to apply for ICC membership by December 2025.
