= Tajikistan Cricket Federation =

Governing body for cricket in Tajikistan

- Sport: Cricket
- Founded: 2011
- Affiliation: International Cricket Council
- Affiliation date: 2021
- Regional affiliation: Asian Cricket Council
- Affiliation date: 2024
- President: Ismat Rustambekov
- Secretary: Ahmad Shah Ahmadi
- Men's coach: (Afghanistan) Naim Ubed
- Women's coach: (Afghanistan) Asadullah Khan
- (Tajikistan)

Tajikistan Cricket Federation is the governing body for cricket in Tajikistan. Cricket in Tajikistan is still in its nascent stage, with the Tajikistan national cricket team only being granted associate status by the International Cricket Council in 2021.

== Administration ==
President:

- Abdurasul Saraev (2011-2013)

General Secretary:

- (Afghanistan) Ahmad Shah Ahmadi (2013-)

Team Manager:

- Naim Navobov (2013-)

Current Head Coaches:

- Men's national team: (Afghanistan) Naim Ubed (2013-)
- Women's national team: (Afghanistan) Asadullah Khan (2013-)

== Development ==
Development Manager:

- (Afghanistan) Rasool Khan Ahmadzai (2013-)
