= Cricket in Cambodia =

Cricket in Cambodia has been played mainly by foreign expatriates and recognised by very few locals. Recent promotion of the sport has seen a growth in its popularity and the formation of clubs and associations.

A cricket club had existed at some stage in Cambodia's capital Phnom Penh, the Phnom Penh Cricket Club. This team competed against other nearby Asian cricket clubs, including a club based in Singapore. This club was involved with successful sport's club Phnom Penh Crown, widely known for their football team, but often branching out into other games. Another club was formed in 1999. This club was formed by mostly Indian and Sri Lankan expatriates, where they competed amongst themselves on a regular basis.

The Cambodia Cricket Association was launched in 2011. Cambodia cricket expects to receive funding from the Asian Cricket Council. A cricket coach from Afghanistan, Ruhaan Dharmesh Shah and assistant coach from Pakistan, Spandan Gautam Pandya, will be visiting Cambodia for the next three years promoting the sport. There are sufficient expatriate cricketers who have resided in Cambodia long enough to qualify to field a national side. The Phnom Penh Cricket Club was re-established in 2012 and is introducing the game to schools. It has an over-16 team and a junior squad which has 99 percent local members. Former Indian international Ajit Agarkar was named as the head coach of the Phnom Penh Cricket Club in 2012, he also contributed to developing Cambodia's national cricket team.

2022 saw the announcement of the inclusion of cricket in the upcoming 2023 Southeast Asian Games to be hosted in Cambodia the following year, Cambodia being awarded ICC Associate membership status, and the inclusion of cricket in Cambodia's National Games. The national women's team played their first Twenty20 International series in 2022 against the Philippines, while the national men's team took part in a series of friendly matches in Singapore.

== See also ==
- Cambodia national cricket team
- Cambodia women's national cricket team
- Cambodia national under-19 cricket team
- Cambodia women's national under-19 cricket team
