= Shane Jurgensen =

Australian cricketer (born 1976)

Personal information
- Full name: Shane John Jurgensen
- Born: 28 April 1976 (age 50); Redcliffe, Queensland, Australia
- Height: 6 ft 2 in (1.88 m)
- Batting: Right-handed
- Bowling: Right-arm fast-medium
- Role: All rounder

Domestic team information
- Years: Team
- 2003/04–2006/07: Queensland
- 2000/01–2002/03: Tasmania
- 1999: Sussex Cricket Board
- 1998/99: Western Australia

Head coaching information
- Years: Team
- 2013–2014: Bangladesh
- 2014–2016: Fiji

Career statistics
| Competition | FC | LA |
|---|---|---|
| Matches | 23 | 14 |
| Runs scored | 251 | 8 |
| Batting average | 11.40 | 4.00 |
| 100s/50s | –/1 | –/– |
| Top score | 56 | 4 |
| Balls bowled | 4,644 | 658 |
| Wickets | 70 | 8 |
| Bowling average | 30.42 | 68.37 |
| 5 wickets in innings | 4 | – |
| 10 wickets in match | 2 | – |
| Best bowling | 6/65 | 2/31 |
| Catches/stumpings | 3/– | 1/– |
- Source: Cricinfo, 4 January 2011

Shane John Jurgensen (born 28 April 1976 in Redcliffe, Queensland) is an Australian cricket coach and former cricketer. He has played for Queensland, but has also played for Western Australia, Tasmania, and the Sussex Cricket Board in English county cricket.

== Playing career ==
Shane Jurgensen was a talented fast bowler who rose to prominence on the Queensland club scene in the early 1990s. Unable to secure a place in his home state's side due to the strength of their bowling attack, he moved to Western Australia, where he made his first-class debut. After a couple of seasons with Western Australia, he moved to Tasmania, where he played some of his best cricket, including a hat-trick against New South Wales, and a record 11 wickets in the 2001-02 Pura Cup final against the Queensland Bulls.

Following his enormous success with Tasmania he returned to Queensland, fulfilling his dream of representing his home state.

== Coaching career ==
=== New Zealand ===
Jurgensen was New Zealand's bowling coach between 2008 and 2010 and was also a coach of New Zealand Cricket's high performance programme.

=== Bangladesh ===
After finishing with New Zealand Cricket in 2010, he was appointed as the Bowling Coach for the Bangladesh National Side in October 2011. After the main coach of Bangladesh Stuart Law left the team in October 2012, he was appointed as interim head coach of Bangladesh. During his first assignment, Bangladesh beat the West Indies by 3–2 in ODI. They however suffered loss in test series by 2–0.

In February 2013 Bangladesh Cricket Board confirmed him as the head coach of the Bangladesh. Under his guidance, Bangladesh white washed New Zealand 3–0 in the ODI series when New Zealand came to visit Bangladesh in October 2013. The test series was drawn 0-0. New Zealand won the one off T-20 match.

Despite being the most successful coach of Bangladesh (at that time), in April 2014, he resigned from his position less than a month after the 2014 ICC World Twenty20 where Bangladesh suffered a shock loss to Hong Kong.

During his tenure, Bangladesh won a Test match after four years against Zimbabwe cricket team and drew Tests against Sri Lanka cricket team in Galle and against New Zealand at home.

=== Fiji ===
In May 2014 Jurgensen was appointed head coach of the Fiji national cricket team for a three-year term. He resigned in October 2015, but reversed his decision the following month. He oversaw the team's qualification for 2015 ICC World Cricket League Division Six and also coached the national under-19 team at the 2016 Under-19 Cricket World Cup. His contract was terminated in February 2016 after he took up a short-term contract with Cricket New Zealand, .

=== Scotland ===
Jurgensen was roped in by Cricket Scotland as a consultant just before 2015 Cricket World Cup in Australia and New Zealand. He consulted Scotland cricket team only for one game, against Bangladesh.

=== Rangpur ===
He was appointed by Rangpur Riders as their head coach for the BPL's third season in 2015. His team came third in the tournament with seven wins in 10 matches.

=== New Zealand ===
In February 2016, Jurgensen was appointed for a second time as bowling coach of New Zealand cricket team. His contract was extended in 2020 and he stayed with New Zealand until after the 2023 Cricket World Cup. During his time with New Zealand he also stood in as the head coach for Gary Stead on 13 occasions, winning 11 times, including a 3-0 ODI series sweep over India at home in 2020. While Jurgensen worked with Stead the New Zealand team won the inaugural 2019–2021 ICC World Test Championship and made the final of the 2019 Cricket World Cup and 2021 ICC Men's T20 World Cup.

=== Wellington ===
After leaving the New Zealand national team, in November 2023 Jurgensen became the head coach of the Wellington Firebirds.

=== Gloucestershire ===
In April 2026, Jurgensen was appointed as bowling consultant at Gloucestershire County Cricket Club.
