= Africa Cricket Association =

International coordinating body for cricket

- Abbreviation: ACA
- Formation: 1997; 29 years ago
- Headquarters: Benoni, South Africa
- Members: 24
- Chairman: Sumod Damodar
- Website: www.africacricket.com

The Africa Cricket Association (ACA) is an international body which coordinates the development of Cricket in Africa. The ACA was founded in 1997. It is subordinate to the International Cricket Council, the council is the continent's regional administrative body, and currently has 24 member associations.

The role of the ACA includes promoting the development of cricket in Africa and organising some regional tournaments. These have included the ACA Africa T20 Cup and the Africa Women's Twenty20 Championship. The role of the ACA is complementary to the International Cricket Council (ICC), which organises the regional qualifying tournaments for global events.

== History ==
The ACA has its origins in the Zone VI Cricket Confederation, which was established in 1991 to coordinate international cricket in Southern Africa along the lines of the African Zone VI Athletics Championships. The inaugural Zone VI tournament was held in Windhoek in September 1991 with Namibia, Botswana, Lesotho, Malawi, and Zambia participating along with the Oxford University Cricket Club as guests. The confederation soon secured the support of the United Cricket Board of South Africa and expanded outside of Southern Africa, with Uganda joining in 1994 and Kenya joining in 1995. In March 1996, a meeting was held in Johannesburg to discuss the formation of an Africa-wide body.

The inaugural annual general meeting of the Africa Cricket Association (ACA) was held in Harare in August 1997. The last Zone VI tournament was also held in 1997 and replaced by an Africa Cup open to countries from all around the continent. Hoosain Ayob was appointed as full-time development director. Peter Chingoka of Zimbabwe was elected chairman of the ACA in 1998, replacing South Africa's Krish Mackerdhuj.

In 2005, the ACA and the Asian Cricket Council (ACC) established Afro-Asian Cricket Cooperation as a vehicle to promote the Afro-Asia Cup, a series of One Day International (ODI) matches between an Africa XI and an Asia XI to raise funds for the development of cricket on both continents. The 2005 Afro-Asia Cup was held in South Africa and suffered from low attendance and a lack of interest from the players, although generating significant television revenues. A second tournament was held in India in 2007 but the event was not continued, although several proposals for a revival have been made.

In 2023, the ACA announced a 10-year partnership with Mumbai-based firm Corcom Media Ventures for the organisation, promotion, and broadcasting of ACA tournaments, including the ACA Africa T20 Cup and plans for a Women's Africa T20 Cup and an African Premier League.

== ACA members ==
No	Country	Association	ICC Membership Status	ICC Membership	ACA Membership
Full Members of ICC (2)
1	South Africa	Cricket South Africa	Full	1909	1997
2	Zimbabwe	Zimbabwe Cricket	Full	1992	1997
Associate Members of ICC with ODI and T20I status (1)
3	Namibia	Cricket Namibia	Associate	1992	1997
Associate Members of ICC with T20I status (20)
4	Botswana	Botswana Cricket Association	Associate	2000	1997
5	Cameroon	Cameroon Cricket Association	Associate	2007	2007
6	Gambia	Gambia Cricket Association	Associate	2002	2002
7	Ghana	Ghana Cricket Association	Associate	2002	2002
8	Ivory Coast	Cote d'Ivoire Cricket Federation	Associate	2022	2022
9	Eswatini	Eswatini Cricket Association	Associate	2007	2007
10	Kenya	Cricket Kenya	Associate	1981	1997
11	Lesotho	Lesotho Cricket Association	Associate	2001	2001
12	Malawi	Malawi Cricket Association	Associate	2003	2003
13	Mali	Fédération Malienne de Cricket	Associate	2005	2005
14	Mauritius	Mauritius Cricket Federation	Associate	2026	2007
15	Mozambique	Mozambican Cricket Association	Associate	2003	2003
16	Nigeria	Nigeria Cricket Federation	Associate	2002	2002
17	Rwanda	Rwanda Cricket Association	Associate	2003	2003
18	Saint Helena	St Helena Cricket Association	Associate	2001	2001
19	Seychelles	Seychelles Cricket Association	Associate	2010	2010
20	Sierra Leone	Cricket Sierra Leone	Associate	2002	2002
21	Tanzania	Tanzania Cricket Association	Associate	2001	2001
22	Uganda	Uganda Cricket Association	Associate	1998	1998
23	Zambia	Zambia Cricket Union	Associate	2003 (Note: Zambia were admitted in ICC in 2003, expelled in 2021, before being readmitted in July 2025.)	2003
Non-Members of ICC but Members of ACA (1)
24	Morocco	Royal Moroccan Cricket Federation	—N/a	1999–2019	1999

=== Future Members ===
No	Country	Association	ICC Membership Status
1	Burkina Faso	Cricket Burkina Faso	—N/a
2	Burundi	Burundi Cricket Federation	—N/a
3	Egypt	Cricket Committee of Egypt	—N/a

== Map ==
As of 17 November 2024

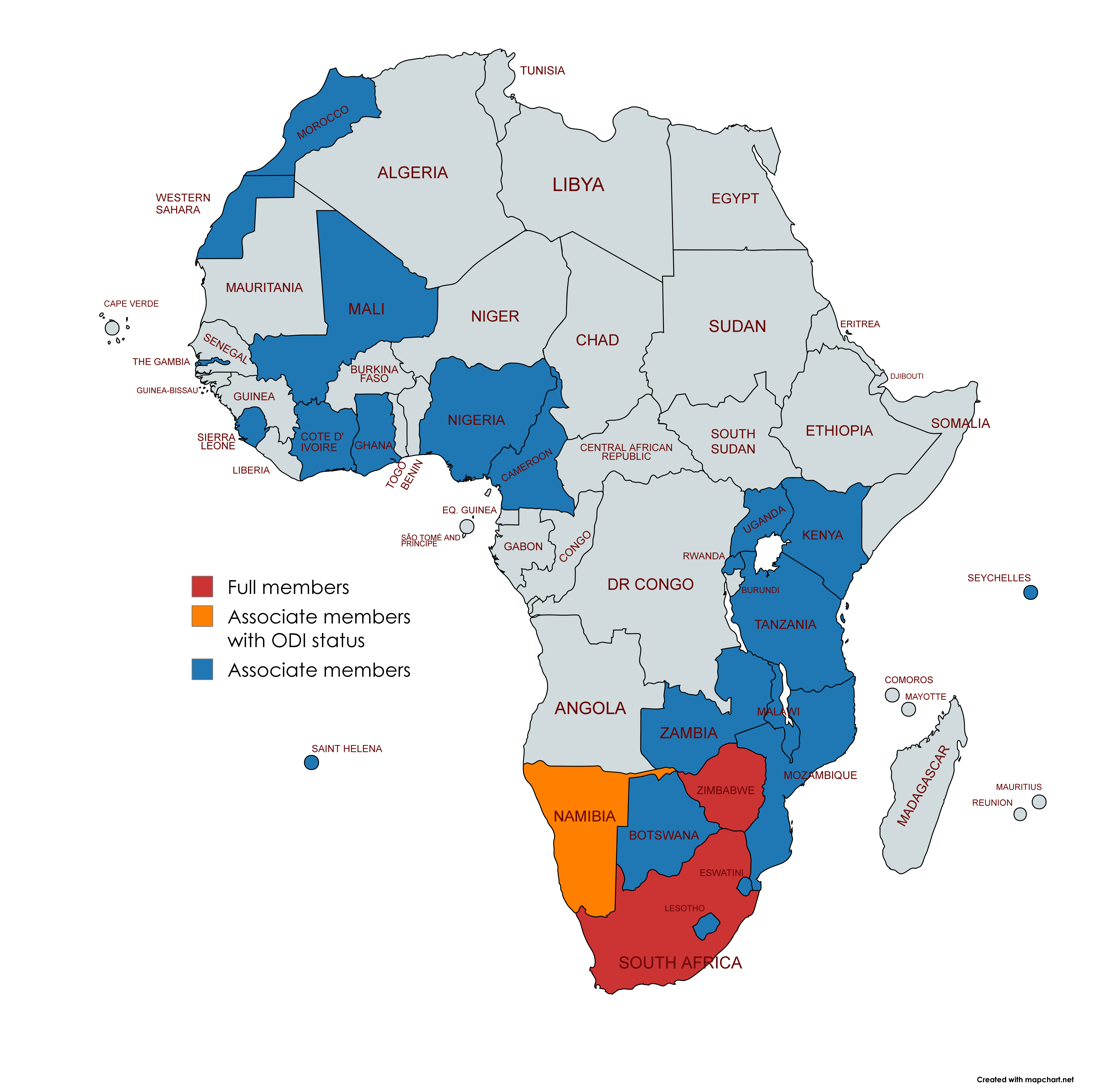
Members of the International Cricket Council, located in Africa. Full members (2) Associate members with ODI status (1) Associate members (20) Non-members
