= Zambia Cricket Union =

Governing body

Zambia Cricket Union is the official governing body of the sport of cricket in Zambia. Its current headquarters is in Lusaka, Zambia. Zambia Cricket Union is Zambia's representative at the International Cricket Council, is an associate member, and has been a member of that body since 2003. It is also a member of the African Cricket Association. The union administers the Zambia national cricket team.

In July 2019, the International Cricket Council (ICC) suspended ZCA, with the team barred from taking part in ICC events. Zambia's membership was formally restored by the ICC in 2025. The ZCA did not authorize the 2026 Asian Legends League. The Asian Legends League played games in Lusaka. As a result of competing in an unsanctioned event, many players faced possible sanctions, including suspension. The Asian Legends League was later cancelled. The cancellation was in large part due to unpaid bills and debts. The Sri Lankan Lions were declared champions despite having only played a few games.
