= Shane Deitz =

Australian cricket official

Personal information
- Full name: Shane Alan Deitz
- Born: 4 May 1975 (age 51); Bankstown, New South Wales, Australia
- Batting: Left-handed
- Bowling: Right-arm leg break
- Role: Wicket-keeper

International information
- National side: Vanuatu (2018–2019)

Domestic team information
- Years: Team
- 1998/99–2007/08: South Australia
- 2002–2004: Lincolnshire

Head coaching information
- Years: Team
- 2014–2018: Vanuatu national cricket team
- 2020–2023: Netherlands women's national cricket team
- 2023–October 2026: West Indies women's cricket team
- November 2026 to present: Pakistan women's cricket team

Career statistics
Competition	FC	LA	T20
Matches	66	27	2
Runs scored	3,753	663	60
Batting average	30.76	25.50	30.00
100s/50s	5/23	0/4	0/0
Top score	154	60	34
Balls bowled	156	24	–
Wickets	2	0	–
Bowling average	53.00	–	–
5 wickets in innings	0	–	–
10 wickets in match	0	–	–
Best bowling	2/17	–	–
Catches/stumpings	89/6	17/0	1/0
- Source: ESPNcricinfo, 16 October 2024

Shane Alan Deitz (born 4 May 1975) is an Australian cricket coach and former player. He played first-class cricket for the Southern Redbacks as a left-handed top-order batsman and occasional wicket-keeper. He was appointed coach of the Netherlands women's national team in 2020, having previously served as head coach (and briefly playing coach) of the Vanuatu men's national team and also as CEO of Vanuatu Cricket. In July 2023, he was named West Indies women's cricket team coach. He is the current coach of the Pakistan women's national team since November 2026.

== Playing career ==
Deitz was a promising junior cricketer, as an under-17 and under-19 representative with the New South Wales Blues. He played for the New South Wales 2nd XI early in his career but after being unable to break into the senior lineup he moved to South Australia where he made his debut in 1998–99.

Deitz would be in and out of the side during the first half of his career but finally found his feet in 2004–05. He cemented his place in the side for 2005/06 after being recalled late in the previous season and making the most of his chance with scores of 90 and 141. Despite not impressing for most of the season he made 154 against New South Wales cricket team in March 2006, which was the highest score in his career. He finished the year with 502 runs at 31.37.

He finished his career with South Australia after the 2007/08 season, at the age of 33. He scored 3753 first-class runs and averaged 30.76 in 66 first-class games, and also took 89 catches and effected six stumpings as a back-up wicket-keeper when Graham Manou was unavailable.

In September 2019, he was named in Vanuatu's squad for the 2019 Malaysia Cricket World Cup Challenge League A tournament.

== Coaching career ==
In 2008, he moved to New Zealand to took up a coaching job with Cricket Wellington. He was named as High Performance Manager as well as head coach of Vanuatu national cricket team in 2014.

In March 2018, after meeting the ICC residency requirements, he was named in Vanuatu's squad as both a player and the coach for the 2018 ICC World Cricket League Division Four tournament in Malaysia. At the age of 42, he made his international debut, top-scoring for Vanuatu in their opening two fixtures of the Division Four tournament. On 3 May 2018, he scored his maiden half-century, in Vanuatu's fourth match of the tournament, against Bermuda. He was the leading run-scorer for Vanuatu in the tournament, with 164 runs in five matches.

In January 2019 he retired as national coach to become CEO of Vanuatu Cricket. He was replaced as head coach by another Australian, Peter Buchanan. In December 2020, Deitz was appointed as the head coach of the Netherlands women's cricket team, the first time a full-time coach was appointed for the Dutch women's team. In July, 2023 Deitz was appointed as Head Coach of the West Indies women's cricket team.

In November 2026, Pakistan Cricket Board appointed Deitz as head coach of the Pakistan women's national team.
