= Cricket in Mauritius =

Cricket in Mauritius is played occasionally when games are arranged by cricket enthusiasts. There is no organised competition structure.

In 1999 four clubs were playing cricket in Mauritius. These were Maurindia, Star, Spartan and United Cricket Clubs. At that point, Maurindia was considered the leading club and twice yearly played the Seychelle Islands representative team in reciprocal visits.

The number of clubs had increased due to the increased popularity of the game in Mauritius and also the increase in expat population on the Island nation.

The following clubs actively play cricket in Mauritius:

1. Mauritian Expats Cricket Club
2. Northfields Cricket Club
3. Black River United Cricket Club (formerly known as Northern Star Cricket Club)
4. Coromandel United Cricket Club
5. Star Knitwear Sports Club
6. Plaines Wilhems Cricket Club
7. Etchelle Cricket Club
8. E R Lions Cricket Club
9. MaurIndia Cricket Club
10. West Coast Cricket Club
11. SSR Medical College
12. Princes Tuna Cricket Club
13. Anna Medical College Cricket Club

The Mauritius Cricket Federation, became an official member of the International Cricket Council in 12 July 2026. Mauritius were members of the African Cricket Association, with plans in 2011 to travel to Zimbabwe to play the Hindu Gymkhana Club, but they were no longer members by 2021. The country last played a competitive fixture in June 2023 when they played Eswatini.

In October 2000, the Beyond The Test World blog in Cricinfo produced its first ever listing about the independent countries and recognised political units where cricket has a presence. Mauritius were listed in the Africa region because there were four cricket clubs there and a cricket tourney, which was one of the criteria for the document.

In 2006, the Maurindia Cricket Club organised the first Day-Night Cricket match at Anjaley Stadium between Indian High Commission – XI Vs Commonwealth XI that was telecasted live on MBC 3 for 4 hours. Maurindia Cricket Club and Riviere du Rempart Star Knitwear Sports Club have joined hands for the promotion of cricket in Mauritius and Federation of Cricket Clubs has been constituted under the patronage of Indian High Commission. The sport has received support from the Ministry of Youth & Sports, whereby a plot of 5.3 hectares (13 acres) of land near Anjaley Stadium is being allotted to the Federation for the construction of a cricket stadium.

In April 2011, Tommy Hammond, of Tommy Hammond Sports, took South African first-class side KwaZulu-Natal Inland Under-15 side to Mauritius.

In June 2013, an action cricket style 6-a-side tournament was organised by Dolphins Cricket Club in Tamarin, attracting 12 youth and adult teams from around the island.

MCB Moneygram T20 cricket league was organised in 2017 where Coromandel Cricket Club beat Northern Star Cricket Club in the final. The second edition of the tournament was organised in 2019 where Northern Star beat Northfields CC in the final.

In 2020, the Mauritius Cricket Federation launched a 10-over format competition.
