= Cricket in Austria =

- Country: Austria
- National team: Austria

International competitions
- Cricket World Cup; ICC World Twenty20; ICC Champions Trophy; Women's Cricket World Cup; Under-19 Cricket World Cup

Cricket in Austria is a sport growing in popularity played mostly in the summer.

== History ==
Having been played by the gardeners of rich aristocratic families at the end of the 19th century - at which time Vienna Cricket and Football Club was founded, cricket disappeared in Austria until after the Second World War, when it was played by British occupying troops on a recreational basis.

The modern era of cricket in Austria as such began in May 1975, when Kerry Tattersall introduced the game to his pupils at the commercial academy where he was teaching English and formed Vienna Cricket Club. Early opponents came from the United Nations (United Nations CC) and diplomatic services (Five Continents CC) and these founder clubs survive to this day.

Cricket remains predominantly Viennese-based with nine of the 13 member clubs being based in Vienna. CC Velden '91 is the oldest non-Viennese club, operating since 1991. The latest addition to the ACA is the Under-19 team Austrian Daredevils Cricket Club (ADCC) from Vienna.

== Grounds ==
Up to 1995, when Seebarn Cricket Ground was built close to Vienna, cricket had been played nomadically on multi-purpose sports grounds, often with a mat put down on a hockey or football ground.

After Seebarn, three other cricket grounds have been constructed: one in Vienna, which is the home ground of Austria CC Wien, one in Velden, Carinthia, home of CC Velden '91, and one in Graz, home of Graz Cricket Academy.

== International competition ==
In the past, Austria has hosted and participated in numerous ICC European competitions, having been instrumental in setting up the European Indoor Championships, and also hosting the ICC European Trophy twice - finishing second on both occasions.

In 2002, Austria played in the ICC European Championships for the first time, with a close loss to Gibraltar being its best performance.

They did not compete again until 2009, when they took part in European Championship Division Four in Cyprus. A decent performance was put up as it won four out of five matches, finishing below Cyprus and Switzerland only on net run-rate.

== Domestic competitions ==
Competitive outdoor cricket matches have been organised by the ACA for more than 20 years in different formats, with the ACA Open League considered the premier tournament. The ACA Trophy, which had previously been a 40-overs-per-side tournament switched to a 20-over format in 2008.

Furthermore, the Austrian clubs organise indoor and outdoor tournaments and friendly fixtures amongst themselves and against touring teams. There are 13 member clubs in the ACA, predominantly from Vienna.

== Cricket Development ==
Austria CC Wien (Vienna) sets an example to the other clubs with its youth, women's and schools' cricket development programme, which has been masterminded by Siva Nadarajah, whose commitment to Austrian cricket over nearly 30 years has been second to none. Its junior teams play regularly against teams from neighboring countries and have been exceptionally successful in recent years.

In 2019, Graz Cricket Academy was formed, with the stated aim of growing the game in Austria at all levels; men, women and youth.
