= Hoosain Ayob =

South African cricket player (1941–2022)

Hoosain Ayob (9 October 1941 – 6 May 2022) was a South African cricketer and official.

== Early life ==
Ayob was born on 9 October 1941 to an Indian South African family. He grew up in Brits in Transvaal Province, but his father died when he was 10 years old and the family moved to Mia's Farm (Waterval Islamic Institute), a Muslim charitable institution in what is now Midrand.

== Playing career ==
In the 1970s, Ayob played for Transvaal in the racially segregated South African Cricket Board of Control tournaments. He was one of the leading fast bowlers but was unable to play in the Currie Cup or for the South Africa national cricket team due to apartheid. In matches that were retrospectively awarded first-class status, he took 53 wickets from 17 matches at a bowling average of 18.41 runs per wicket.

== Coaching and development work ==
Ayob took a keen interest in developing cricket in South Africa's townships and African countries outside South Africa. In 1998 he was appointed the Africa Cricket Association's first full-time development director. Kenya's Martin Suji credited him with developing African coaches and introducing softball cricket and mini-cricket as ways to popularise cricket with African children.

== Personal life ==
Ayob was a schoolteacher by profession. He published a memoir titled Crossing Boundaries in 2020. He died in Port Elizabeth on 7 May 2022 from a kidney disorder.
