= Cricket Switzerland =

Cricket Switzerland, formerly the Swiss Cricket Association (SCA) incorporated in the Canton of Zürich, is the first governing body of cricket in Switzerland.

== History ==
The inaugural meeting was held on 9 March 1980 at the Australian Embassy in Berne, although, as the water colour of "Vue de la Ville de Genève et de Plein-Palais (Florence 1769-1845)" from 1817 by Giovanni Salucci shows, cricket has been played in Geneva since at least 1817.

Four clubs were represented at the original meeting: Bern C.C., CERN C.C., Geneva C.C. and Geneva Asians C.C., while apologies were received from Baden C.C., Basel C.C. and Zurich C.C. A draft constitution was agreed and subsequently ratified at the first annual general meeting of the association. Today, the association has an associate membership of 21 clubs & six affiliated clubs and associations.

The first SCA president was David Barmes of Geneva C.C. and Roger Johnson (of the same club) the first secretary. Brennan, the then Australian ambassador, presented a trophy to be played for in a knock-out competition between six clubs divided geographically into two sections. The winners of each group then played in a deciding final, for which, in 1983, the Malaysian Ambassador donated a cup for the Man of the Match. The main S.C.A. competition has been reorganized several times since and the current league format involves fifteen clubs divided into East & West divisions.

In recent years, the Mr. Pickwick T20 Cup, a Twenty20 Competition, has been added to the fixture schedule.

In 1985, at the initiative of the Lyceum Alpinum, Zuoz, the SCA helped to organise the first Zuoz Cricket Festival. The Lyceum has a long tradition of cricket and other "British" sports (e.g. Eton Fives) dating from the 1920s when an English sports master was appointed. Four cricket matches can be played simultaneously on the grounds at Zuoz in an idyllic setting at an altitude of 1,700 metres (5,600 ft). Following a modest start (only four clubs participated in 1985), the festival is now well established with the regular participation of eight clubs.

A Swiss national side played in the inaugural Cricketer International Tournament in Guernsey in 1990, narrowly missing the semi-final by 0.1 runs/over. Tours have been made over the years to various countries by individual clubs and by the association, and there have been welcome visits by touring teams to Switzerland.

In 1985 the association was granted affiliate status of the ICC. In 2012, Switzerland lost its ICC affiliate status due to the creation of a second organisation (Schweizerischer Cricket Verband).

On 1 March 2014 the association was rebranded as Cricket Switzerland. The current president of the Cricket Switzerland is Alexander Mackay. Elected in 2011, he became the association's sixth president, succeeding John McKillop, attaining membership of Swiss Olympic at the Sports Parliament in November, 2017.

In October 2020, Cricket Switzerland re-applied for ICC membership.

== Clubs playing in the Cricket Switzerland Premier League ==
Nine teams from across the country compete in the Cricket Switzerland Premier League, a 40 over cricket league format featuring the top 9 teams in the country. Teams will play against each other in a home and away format. The team with the highest number of points will be crowned Champions of Switzerland at the end of the season. The season commences on 3 April and concludes on 25 September. The bottom two teams at the end of the season will be relegated to the National League in the following season.

CSPL Teams for 2024 season: Berne CC Basel CC Cossonay CC Geneva CC Nomads CC Olten CC Power WCC Zurich Crickets CC Zug CC

== Clubs playing in the Cricket Switzerland National League ==
Teams from across the country compete in the Cricket Switzerland National League (CSNL), a 40 over cricket league format competition with geographically spilt divisions, with the top teams from each division progressing to a quarter-final stage and the finalists being granted the opportunity for promotion to the CSPL in the following season.

Participating Teams

Western Division

GICC GESLCC Geneva XI Stars CC Geneva CC-2 Rhone CC

Central Division CC Wettingen CC Wettingen-2 Aargau CC Swiss Afghan CC CV Zug Novartis CC Basel CC Colts Olten Youth

Eastern Division Pakhtoon Zalmi CC Zurich Lions CC Winterthur CC ZCCC St Gallen CC CC Zurich Nomads CC-2 Rorschach CC

== Clubs playing in the Cricket Switzerland Pickwick Cup T20 Competition ==
=== Eastern Division ===
- Aargau CC
- Olten CC
- Pakhtoon Zalmi CC
- Power Winterthur CC
- Nomads CC
- Novartis CC
- Winterthur CC
- St. Gallen CC
- Zurich Lions CC
- Zug CC
- Zurich Crickets CC (I & II)

=== Western Division ===
- Geneva CC
- Geneva Sri Lanka CC
- Geneva XI Stars CC
- Geneva International CC
- CERN CC
- Bern CC
- Cossonay CC

== Women's Cricket in Switzerland ==
Women's Cricket began in earnest in Switzerland in the year 2016 with the formation of Zurich Sapphires Cricket Club.

Members of Zurich Sapphires later went on to represent the Swiss National Women's squad in 2017 at the Austria-Swiss 7 a-side series held in Vienna winning the competition and thus becoming the first women's cricket team in the history of women's cricket in Switzerland.

=== Player's representing the Swiss Women's Team in 2017 ===
The following lists the Swiss squad that represented Switzerland in the Austria-Swiss series in 2017.

- Jennifer Hallam (Captain)
- Mrinalika Singh Dev
- Sudha Shanmugam
- Vijy Chittakkattu
- Paulina Kratka
- Varsha Patil
- Veena Mampilly(+)

== Youth Cricket in Switzerland ==
The following clubs cater for youth cricket in Switzerland

- Basel Dragon Juniors CC
- Cossonay CC
- Gingins Cricket Club
- Geneva Regional Youth CC (GRYCC for short)
- La Chat
- Lyceum Alpinum
- Zurich Crickets CC
- SSCA
- Wettingen CC
