= Cricket Fiji =

Governing body of cricket in Fiji

- Sport: Cricket
- Jurisdiction: Fiji
- Founded: 1946
- Affiliation: International Cricket Council
- Affiliation date: 1965 (associate member)
- Regional affiliation: ICC East Asia-Pacific
- Headquarters: Suva

Official website
- cricketfiji.net
- (Fiji)

Cricket Fiji is the official governing body of the sport of cricket in Fiji. Its current headquarters is in Suva. The organisation was founded in 1946, as the Fiji Cricket Association, and became an associate member of the International Cricket Council (ICC) in 1965. Fiji falls within the ICC East Asia-Pacific development region.

== See also ==
- Fiji national cricket team
- Fiji women's national cricket team
- Fiji national under-19 cricket team
