= International Cricket Council =

International governing body of cricket

- Abbreviation: ICC
- Formation: 15 June 1909; 117 years ago
- Founded at: London, United Kingdom
- Type: International sport federation
- Headquarters: London, United Kingdom; (1909–2005); Dubai, United Arab Emirates; (2005–present)
- Members: 111 members (2026)
- Official language: English
- Chairman: Jay Shah
- Deputy Chairman: Tavengwa Mukuhlani
- CEO: Sanjog Gupta
- General Manager: Wasim Khan
- Revenue: US$756.3 million (2025)
- Expenses: US$213 million (2025)
- Award: ICC Awards
- Website: icc-cricket.com/index
- Formerly called: Imperial Cricket Conference; (1909–1965); International Cricket Conference; (1965–1987)

The International Cricket Council (ICC) is the global governing body of the sport of cricket. It was founded as the Imperial Cricket Conference on 15 June 1909 by the representatives of the Australian Cricket Board, England and Wales Cricket Board, and South African Cricket Association at Lord's. In 1965, the body was renamed as the International Cricket Conference and its current name was adopted in 1987. The ICC is legally registered in the British Virgin Islands and has its headquarters in Dubai, United Arab Emirates.

The membership of the council has steadily increased from the founding three members, to over a hundred members by the 21st century. The ICC has 111 member nations, 12 of whom are designated as full members and are eligible to play Test cricket, while the remaining 98 are classified as associate members.

The ICC is responsible for the organisation and governance of international cricket tournaments, most notably the Men's and Women's ODI World Cups, Men's and Women's T20 World Cups, World Test Championship, and Men's and Women's Champions Trophy. It also appoints the umpires and referees that officiate at all Test matches, ODIs and T20Is. It promulgates the ICC Code of Conduct, which sets professional standards of discipline for international cricket. It also co-ordinates action against corruption and match-fixing through its Anti-Corruption and Security Unit. The ICC does not control bilateral fixtures between member countries (except the World Test Championship final), and domestic cricket within its member countries. It does not make or alter the laws of the game, which have remained under the governance of Marylebone Cricket Club (MCC) since 1788.

The president served as the head of ICC since its inception, with the president of MCC usually serving as the president of ICC till 1989. In July 1989, the practice of the MCC president automatically serving as the president of the ICC was abolished, and Colin Cowdrey became the first independent president of the ICC. In 1993, the position of chief executive was created, and David Richards was the first to be appointed to the position. The position of the Chairman was created in 2014, and N. Srinivasan was announced as the first chairman of the council. The role of ICC president became a largely honorary position after the establishment of the chairman role, and was altogether abolished in April 2016. Shashank Manohar, who replaced Srinivasan in October 2015, became the first independent elected chairman of the ICC.

== History ==
=== Imperial Cricket Conference (1909–1963) ===
On 30 November 1907, Abe Bailey, the president of the South African Cricket Association, wrote a letter to the Francis Lacey, the secretary of the Marylebone Cricket Club (MCC) in England, suggesting the formation of an Imperial Cricket Board. Bailey suggested that the board would be responsible for the formulation of rules and regulations for international cricket matches between Australia, England, and South Africa. He further offered to host a triangular Test series amongst the teams in South Africa. Though, the Australian Cricket Board rejected the initial terms, Bailey lobbied for the same during the Australia's tour of England in 1909.

On 15 June 1909, representatives from the Australian Cricket Board, England and Wales Cricket Board, and South African Cricket Association met at Lord's and founded the Imperial Cricket Conference. A month later, a second meeting between the three members was held. The rules were agreed upon amongst the nations, and the first-ever tri-Test series was decided to be held in England in 1912. In 1926, West Indies, New Zealand, and India were elected as full members, doubling the number of Test-playing nations to six. Pakistan was inducted in 1952, becoming the seventh Test-playing nation. In May 1961, South Africa left the British Commonwealth and therefore lost the membership.

=== International Cricket Conference (1964–1988) ===
In 1964, the name was changed to International Cricket Conference (ICC), and the ICC agreed to include non-Test playing countries as associate members. The Ceylon (who later became Sri Lanka), Fiji, and the United States were admitted as the first associate members. In 1968, Bermuda, Denmark, East Africa, and Netherlands were admitted as associates, while South Africa was still not part of the ICC. In 1969, the basic rules of the ICC were amended. At the ICC meeting in 1971, the idea of organizing a Cricket World Cup was floated, and in 1973, it was decided that the first World Cup would be played in 1975 in England. The six Test-playing nations– Australia, England, India, New Zealand, Pakistan, and West Indies along with East Africa and Sri Lanka were invited to take part in the 1975 Cricket World Cup.

New associate members were subsequently added to the ICC in the 1970s, including Israel and Singapore in 1974, West Africa in 1976, Bangladesh in 1977, and Papua New Guinea in 1978. While South Africa applied to rejoin, its application was rejected. In 1981, Sri Lanka was promoted to a full member, and played its first Test in 1982. In 1984, a third class of membership was introduced, and Italy became the first affiliate member, followed by Switzerland in 1985. In 1987, the Bahamas and France were admitted, followed by Nepal in 1988.

=== International Cricket Council (1989–present) ===
In July 1989, the ICC was renamed as the International Cricket Council. The practice of the MCC president automatically serving as the president of the ICC was abolished, and Colin Cowdrey became the first independent president of the ICC. In 1990, the UAE joined as an associate member. In 1991, the ICC meeting was held in Melbourne, the first time it was held outside of England. South Africa was re-elected as a full member of the ICC in July, following the end of apartheid. In 1992, Zimbabwe was admitted as the ninth full member. Later, Namibia joined as an associate member, and Austria, Belgium, Brunei and Spain joined as affiliates. The third umpire, who was equipped with video playback facilities, was introduced in 1992.

In 1993, the position of chief executive was created, and David Richards of the Australian Cricket Board was appointed to the position. In July, Clyde Walcott was elected as the first non-British chairman. By 1995, television replays were made available for run-outs and stumpings in Test matches, with the third umpire required to signal out or not out with red and green lights respectively. The following year, cameras were used for the first time to determine if the ball had crossed the boundary. In 1997, decisions on the cleanness of catches could be referred to the third umpire, and the Duckworth-Lewis method, a way of adjusting targets in rain-affected ODI matches, was introduced.

In 2000, Bangladesh was admitted as the tenth full member. In 2005, the ICC moved its new headquarters to Dubai. In 2014, the position of chairman was created, who would heads the board of directors, thereby reducing the powers of the president. On 26 June, N. Srinivasan was announced as the first chairman of the council. However, following the tenure of Zaheer Abbas, the post of president was abolished in April 2016, and Shashank Manohar, who replaced Srinivasan in October 2015, became the first independent elected chairman of the ICC. With the role change, the Chief Executive Officer was to oversee sustenance of various cricket formats, promoting Olympic inclusion, and expanding global engagement.

In 2017, Afghanistan and Ireland were admitted as the eleventh and twelfth full members. The affiliate membership system was also abolished, with all existing affiliate members becoming associate members. In 2018, all Women's T20I matches between member teams were elevated to Women's Twenty20 International status. In 2019, all Men's T20I matches were elevated to International status. In July 2022, Cambodia, Ivory Coast, and Uzbekistan were granted associate member status by the ICC.

== Members ==
=== Regional affiliations ===
ICC regions: Asian Cricket Council (ACC) Africa Cricket Association (ACA) ICC Europe ICC Americas ICC East Asia-Pacific

The ICC members are organised into five regions governed by respective regional bodies:

- Africa Cricket Association
- Asian Cricket Council
- ICC Americas
- ICC East Asia-Pacific
- ICC Europe

The East and Central Africa Cricket Conference and West Africa Cricket Council managed cricket in Africa, before their merge to form the Africa Cricket Association in 1997. The European Cricket Council managed cricket operations in Europe except the United Kingdom, before it was replaced by ICC Europe in 2008, and later dissolved in 2010.

=== Full members ===
Current ICC members by membership status: Full members Associate members with ODI status Associate members Former or suspended members Non-members

The Full members include the 12 governing bodies of teams that have full voting rights within the ICC and play official Test matches.

No	Country	Teams	Governing body	Full member since	Test status since	Region
1	England	Men • Women • U19M • U19W	England and Wales Cricket Board	15 June 1909	15 March 1877	Europe
2	Australia	Men • Women • U19M • U19W	Cricket Australia	15 June 1909	15 March 1877	East Asia-Pacific
3	South Africa	Men • Women • U19M • U19W	Cricket South Africa	15 June 1909	12 March 1889	Africa
4	West Indies	Men • Women • U19M • U19W	Cricket West Indies	31 May 1926	23 June 1928	Americas
5	New Zealand	Men • Women • U19M • U19W	New Zealand Cricket	31 May 1926	10 January 1930	East Asia-Pacific
6	India	Men • Women • U19M • U19W	Board of Control for Cricket in India	31 May 1926	25 June 1932	Asia
7	Pakistan	Men • Women • U19M • U19W	Pakistan Cricket Board	28 July 1952	16 October 1952	Asia
8	Sri Lanka	Men • Women • U19M • U19W	Sri Lanka Cricket	21 July 1981	21 July 1981	Asia
9	Zimbabwe	Men • Women • U19M • U19W	Zimbabwe Cricket	6 July 1992	18 October 1992	Africa
10	Bangladesh	Men • Women • U19M • U19W	Bangladesh Cricket Board	26 June 2000	10 November 2000	Asia
11	Ireland	Men • Women • U19M • U19W	Cricket Ireland	22 June 2017	11 May 2018	Europe
12	Afghanistan	Men • Women • U19M	Afghanistan Cricket Board	22 June 2017	14 June 2018	Asia

=== Associate members ===
The associate members include 98 governing bodies in countries where cricket is firmly established and organized, but have not been granted full membership. Amongst these, eight associate teams have ODI status, and are part of the ICC Men's ODI Team Rankings.

No	Country	Governing body	Associate member since	ODI status since	Region
1	Netherlands	Royal Dutch Cricket Association	1966	2018	Europe
2	Canada	Cricket Canada	1968	2023	Americas
3	United Arab Emirates	Emirates Cricket Board	1990	2014	Asia
4	Namibia	Cricket Namibia	1992	2019	Africa
5	Scotland	Cricket Scotland	1994	2005	Europe
6	Nepal	Cricket Association of Nepal	1996	2018	Asia
7	Oman	Oman Cricket	2014	2019	Asia
8	United States	USA Cricket	2019	2019	Americas

Associate nations

No	Country	Teams	Government	Affiliate membership (Note: The date the country gained Affiliate Membership. This was a membership level below Associate Membership. The two were combined.)	Associate membership	Region
1	Argentina	Men • Women • U19	Argentine Cricket Association	N/A	1974	Americas
2	Austria	Men • Women • U19	Austrian Cricket Association	1992	2017	Europe
3	Bahamas	Men • Women • U19	Bahamas Cricket Association	1987	2017	Americas
4	Bahrain	Men • Women • U19	Bahrain Cricket Association	2001	2017	Asia
5	Belgium	Men • Women • U19	Belgian Cricket Federation	1991	2005	Europe
6	Belize	Men • Women • U19	Belize National Cricket Association	1997	2017	Americas
7	Bermuda	Men • Women • U19	Bermuda Cricket Board	N/A	1966	Americas
8	Bhutan	Men • Women • U19	Bhutan Cricket Council Board	2001	2017	Asia
9	Botswana	Men • Women • U19	Botswana Cricket Association	2001	2005	Africa
10	Brazil	Men • Women • U19	Brazilian Cricket Confederation	2002	2017	Americas
11	Bulgaria	Men • Women • U19	Bulgarian Cricket Federation	2008	2017	Europe
12	Cambodia	Men • Women • U19	Cricket Association of Cambodia	N/A	2022	Asia
13	Cameroon	Men • Women • U19	Cameroon Cricket Federation	2007	2017	Africa
14	Canada	Men • Women • U19	Cricket Canada	N/A	1968	Americas
15	Cayman Islands	Men • Women • U19	Cayman Islands Cricket Association	1997	2002	Americas
16	Chile	Men • Women • U19	Chilean Cricket Association	2002	2017	Americas
17	China	Men • Women • U19	Chinese Cricket Association	2004	2017	Asia
18	Cook Islands	Men • Women • U19	Cook Islands Cricket Association	2000	2017	East Asia-Pacific
19	Costa Rica	Men • Women • U19	Costa Rica Cricket Federation	2002	2017	Americas
20	Croatia	Men • Women • U19	Croatian Cricket Federation	2001	2017	Europe
21	Cyprus	Men • Women • U19	Cyprus Cricket Association	1999	2017	Europe
22	Czech Republic	Men • Women • U19	Czech Cricket Union	2000	2017	Europe
23	Denmark	Men • Women • U19	Danish Cricket Federation	N/A	1966	Europe
24	Estonia	Men • Women • U19	Estonian Cricket Association	2008	2017	Europe
25	Eswatini	Men • Women • U19	Eswatini Cricket Association	2007	2017	Africa
26	Falkland Islands	Men • Women • U19	Falkland Cricket Association	2007	2017	Americas
27	Fiji	Men • Women • U19	Cricket Fiji	N/A	1965	East Asia-Pacific
28	Finland	Men • Women • U19	Cricket Finland	2000	2017	Europe
29	France	Men • Women • U19	France Cricket Association	1987	1998	Europe
30	Gambia	Men • Women • U19	Gambia Cricket Association	2002	2017	Africa
31	Germany	Men • Women • U19	German Cricket Federation	1991	1999	Europe
32	Ghana	Men • Women • U19	Ghana Cricket Association	2002	2017	Africa
33	Gibraltar	Men • Women • U19	Gibraltar Cricket Association	N/A	1969	Europe
34	Greece	Men • Women • U19	Hellenic Cricket Federation	1995	2017	Europe
35	Guernsey	Men • Women • U19	Guernsey Cricket Board	2005	2008	Europe
36	Hong Kong	Men • Women • U19	Cricket Hong Kong	N/A	1969	Asia
37	Hungary	Men • Women • U19	Hungarian Cricket Association	2012	2017	Europe
38	Indonesia	Men • Women • U19	Cricket Indonesia	2001	2017	Asia/East Asia-Pacific
39	Iran	Men • Women • U19	Islamic Republic of Iran Cricket Association	2003	2017	Asia
40	Isle of Man	Men • Women • U19	Isle of Man Cricket Association	2004	2017	Europe
41	Israel	Men • Women • U19	Israel Cricket Association	N/A	1974	Europe
42	Italy	Men • Women • U19	Italian Cricket Federation	1984	1995	Europe
43	Ivory Coast	Men • Women • U19	Ivory Coast Cricket Federation	N/A	2022	Africa
44	Japan	Men • Women • U19	Japan Cricket Association	1989	2005	Asia/East Asia-Pacific
45	Jersey	Men • Women • U19	Jersey Cricket Board	2005	2007	Europe
46	Kenya	Men • Women • U19	Cricket Kenya	N/A	1981	Africa
47	Kuwait	Men • Women • U19	Cricket Kuwait	1998	2005	Asia
48	Lesotho	Men • Women • U19	Lesotho Cricket Association	2001	2017	Africa
49	Luxembourg	Men • Women • U19	Luxembourg Cricket Federation	1998	2017	Europe
50	Malawi	Men • Women • U19	Cricket Malawi	1998	2017	Africa
51	Malaysia	Men • Women • U19	Malaysian Cricket Association	N/A	1967	Asia
52	Maldives	Men • Women • U19	Cricket Board of Maldives	1998	2017	Asia
53	Mali	Men • Women • U19	Malian Cricket Federation	2005	2017	Africa
54	Malta	Men • Women • U19	Malta Cricket Association	1998	2017	Europe
55	Mauritius	Men • Women • U19	Mauritius Cricket Federation	N/A	2026	Africa
56	Mexico	Men • Women • U19	Mexico Cricket Association	2004	2017	Americas
57	Mongolia	Men • Women • U19	Mongolia Cricket Association	N/A	2021	Asia
58	Mozambique	Men • Women • U19	Mozambican Cricket Association	2003	2017	Africa
59	Myanmar	Men • Women • U19	Myanmar Cricket Federation	2006	2017	Asia
60	Namibia	Men • Women • U19	Cricket Namibia	N/A	1992	Africa
61	Nepal	Men • Women • U19	Cricket Association of Nepal	1988	1996	Asia
62	Netherlands	Men • Women • U19	Royal Dutch Cricket Association	N/A	1966	Europe
63	Nigeria	Men • Women • U19	Nigeria Cricket Federation	N/A	2002	Africa
64	Norway	Men • Women • U19	Norwegian Cricket Board	2000	2017	Europe
65	Oman	Men • Women • U19	Oman Cricket	2000	2014	Asia
66	Panama	Men • Women • U19	Panama Cricket Association	2002	2017	Americas
67	Papua New Guinea	Men • Women • U19	Cricket PNG	N/A	1973	East Asia-Pacific
68	Peru	Men • Women • U19	Peru Cricket Association	2007	2017	Americas
69	Philippines	Men • Women • U19	Philippine Cricket Association	2000	2017	East Asia-Pacific
70	Portugal	Men • Women • U19	Portuguese Cricket Federation	1996	2017	Europe
71	Qatar	Men • Women • U19	Qatar Cricket Association	1999	2017	Asia
72	Romania	Men • Women • U19	Cricket Romania	2013	2017	Europe
73	Rwanda	Men • Women • U19	Rwanda Cricket Association	2003	2017	Africa
74	Saint Helena	Men • Women • U19	St Helena Cricket Association	2001	2017	Africa
75	Samoa	Men • Women • U19	Samoa International Cricket Association	2000	2017	East Asia-Pacific
76	Saudi Arabia	Men • Women • U19	Saudi Arabian Cricket Federation	2003	2016	Asia
77	Scotland	Men • Women • U19	Cricket Scotland	N/A	1994	Europe
78	Serbia	Men • Women • U19	Serbian Cricket Federation	2015	2017	Europe
79	Seychelles	Men • Women • U19	Seychelles Cricket Association	2010	2017	Africa
80	Sierra Leone	Men • Women • U19	Cricket Sierra Leone	2002	2017	Africa
81	Singapore	Men • Women • U19	Singapore Cricket Association	N/A	1974	Asia
82	Slovenia	Men • Women • U19	Slovenian Cricket Association	2005	2017	Europe
83	South Korea	Men • Women • U19	Korea Cricket Association	2001	2017	East Asia-Pacific
84	Spain	Men • Women • U19	Cricket Spain	1992	2017	Europe
85	Suriname	Men • Women • U19	Suriname Cricket Board	2002	2011	Americas
86	Sweden	Men • Women • U19	Swedish Cricket Federation	1997	2017	Europe
87	Switzerland	Men • Women • U19	Cricket Switzerland	1985 (Note: Switzerland were admitted in 1985, but were expelled in 2012, before being readmitted in July 2021.)	2021	Europe
88	Tajikistan	Men • Women • U19	Tajikistan Cricket Federation	N/A	2021	Asia
89	Tanzania	Men • Women • U19	Tanzania Cricket Association	N/A	2001	Africa
90	Thailand	Men • Women • U19	Cricket Association of Thailand	1995	2005	Asia
91	Timor-Leste	Men • Women • U19	Timor-Leste Cricket Board	N/A	2025	East Asia-Pacific
92	Turkey	Men • Women • U19	Cricket Turkey	2008	2017	Europe
93	Turks and Caicos Islands	Men • Women • U19	Turks and Caicos Cricket Association	2002	2017	Americas
94	Uganda	Men • Women • U19	Uganda Cricket Association	N/A	1998	Africa
95	United Arab Emirates	Men • Women • U19	Emirates Cricket Board	1989	1990	Asia
96	United States of America	Men • Women • U19	USA Cricket	N/A	1965 (Note: The USA were admitted as an associate member in 1965 under the governance of the United States of America Cricket Association, which was expelled in September 2017. USA Cricket was admitted in January 2019.); 2019	Americas
97	Uzbekistan	Men • Women • U19	Cricket Federation of Uzbekistan	N/A	2022	Asia
98	Vanuatu	Men • Women • U19	Vanuatu Cricket Association	1995	2009	East Asia-Pacific
99	Zambia	Men • Women • U19	Zambia Cricket Union	N/A	2025	Africa

== Organisation and finance ==
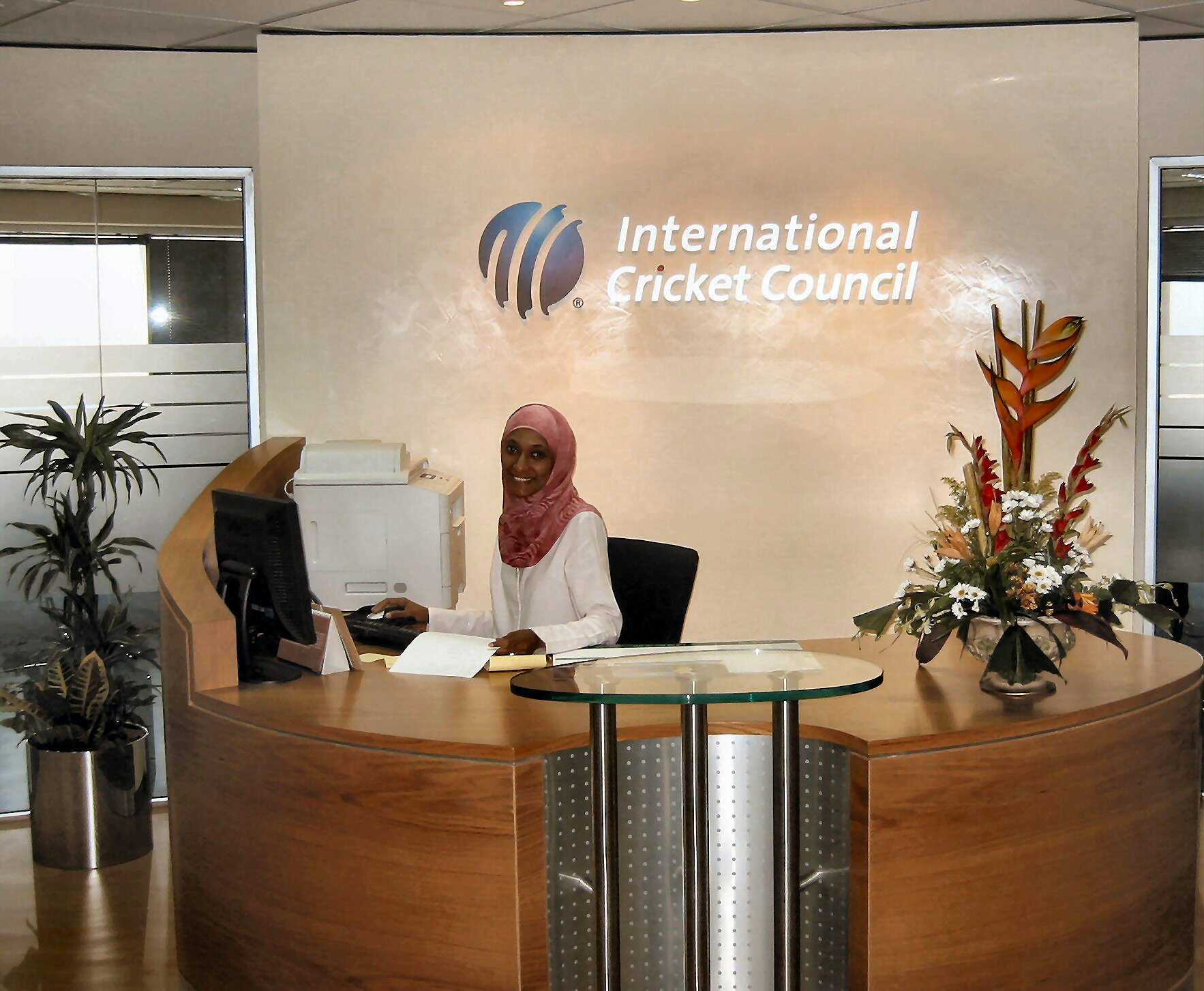
ICC headquarters in Dubai

Since its creation, the ICC had been headquartered at the Lord's. The ICC generates revenue through international cricketing events, and the ICC Development International (IDI) was established as a subsidiary in 1994, based out of Monaco, to manage the commercial rights. In the early 2000s, as the Government of United Kingdom refused tax concessions, the ICC planned to shift its headquarters out of London. In August 2005, the ICC moved its headquarters to Dubai, and subsequently closed its offices at London and Monaco. The ICC's move to Dubai also brought it closer to its main revenue generator in cricketing power in South Asia. The IDI was subsequently registered in the British Virgin Islands.

The ICC generates income from the tournaments it organises, including sponsorship and television rights. The ICC has no income streams from the bilateral international cricket matches, and the income is distributed to its share holders. Over the years, it has introduced new competitions such as ICC Champions Trophy, ICC Super Series, and ICC T20 World Cup to augment the revenue. In 2023, ICC reported a revenue of US$904.385 million.

== Tournaments and winners ==
=== ICC tournaments ===
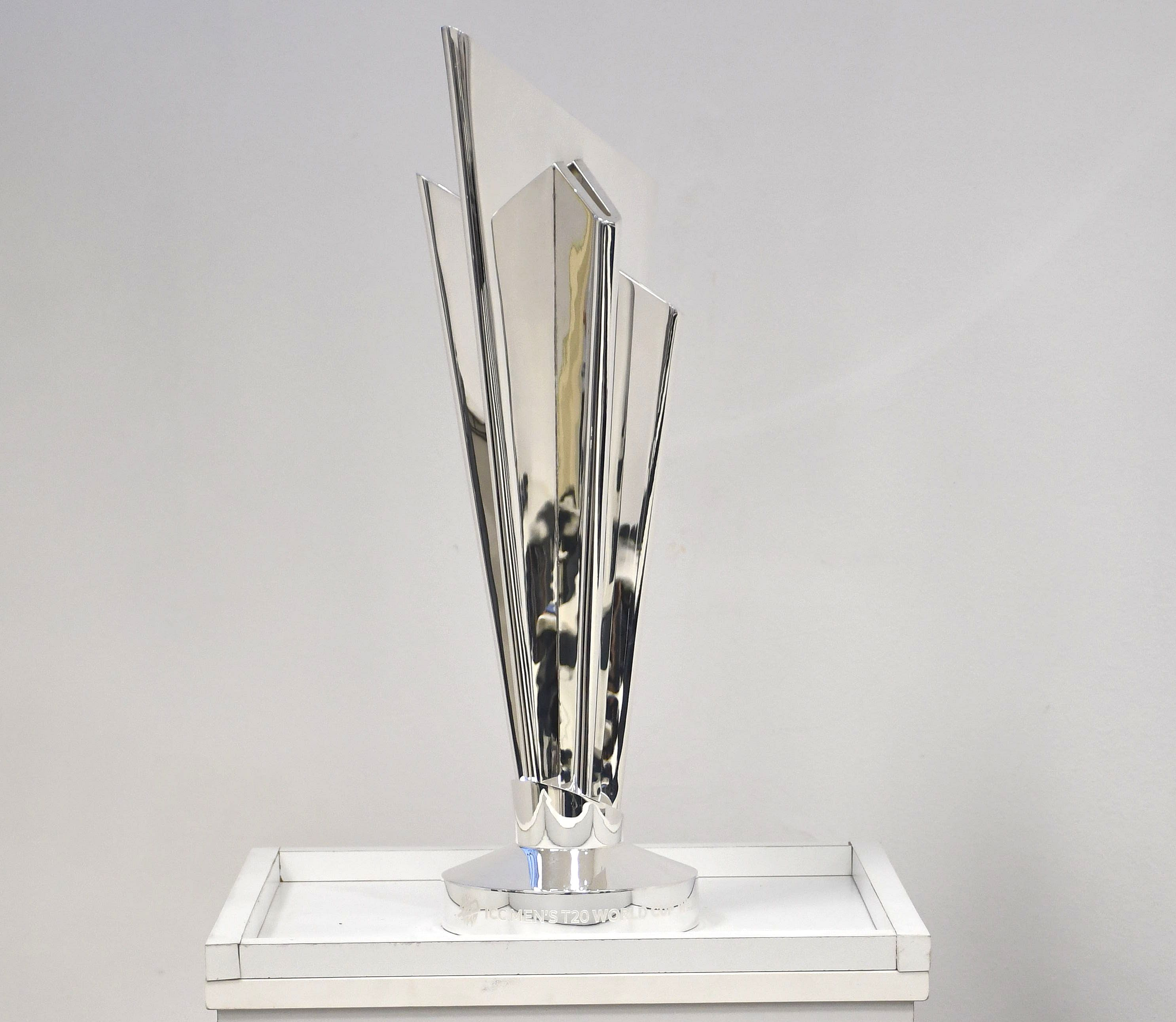
T20 World Cup trophy

Tournament	Format	Tournaments	Current Champion	Most titles	First	Last	Next
Men
Cricket World Cup	ODI	13	Australia	Australia (6)	1975	2023	2027
Champions Trophy	ODI	8 (Note: It was known as ICC KnockOut trophy during the first two editions in 1998 and 2000)	India	India (3)	1998	2025	2029
T20 World Cup	T20I	10 (Note: It was known as ICC World T20 from 2007 to 2016, and was rebranded as Men's T20 World Cup in 2018.)	India	India (3)	2007	2026	2028
World Test Championship	Test	3	South Africa	Australia (1), New Zealand (1), South Africa (1)	2021	2025	2027
Women
Cricket World Cup	WODI	13	India	Australia (7)	1973	2025	2029
T20 World Cup	WT20I	10 (Note: It was known as ICC Women's World T20 from 2009 to 2018, and was rebranded as Women's T20 World Cup in 2020.)	Australia	Australia (7)	2009	2026	2028
Champions Trophy	WT20I	—N/a	—N/a	—N/a	—N/a	—N/a	2027
Under-19
U19 Men's Cricket World Cup	YODI	16	India	India (6)	1988	2026	2028
U19 Women's T20 World Cup	YT20I	2	India	India (2)	2023	2025	2027

=== Qualifiers ===
The ICC organizes qualifying tournaments for various international main events.

Format	ODI	T20I
Men	Cricket World Cup Qualifier	Men's T20 World Cup qualification
Women	Women's Cricket World Cup Qualifier	Women's T20 World Cup qualification
Women	ICC Women's Championship	Women's T20 World Cup qualification

A two-tier league system with promotion and relegation exists where best performing teams qualify for the Cricket World Cup Qualifier. It was a three tier system earlier with the Cricket World Cup Super League as the top-tier, which was scrapped for the 2027 World Cup qualifier.

Tier	League	Teams	Current edition
1	Cricket World Cup League 2	8	2024–2026
2	Cricket World Cup Challenge League	12	2024–2026

== Cricketing laws and regulations ==
The ICC oversees playing conditions, and other sporting regulations, but does not dictate and manage the Laws of Cricket. The laws are managed by the MCC in consultation with the ICC. The ICC maintains a set of playing conditions for international cricket and maintain a Code of Conduct to which teams and players in international matches are required to adhere. Breaches of the conditions and code result in penalties.

== Umpires and referees ==
The ICC appoints international umpires and match referees who officiate at all international matches. The ICC operates three panels of umpires: the Elite Panel, the International Panel, and the Associates and Affiliates Panel.

Every cricket match has two on-field umpires and a third umpire. The on-field umpires ensure the playing terms, and make decisions related to the events on field. The third umpire uses TV replays and other technology to adjudicate decisions, if referred to by the umpires, or in certain cases independently or through player referrals. The Elite Panel of umpires was introduced in April 2002 and forms the top tier of match officials. The International Panel is made up of officials nominated from the various Test-playing nations. These members officiate in ODI matches in their home country, and may be appointed to assist the Elite Panel at times. They also undertake umpiring assignments in junior ICC events. The inaugural ICC Associate and Affiliate Panel was formed in June 2006. Members of the panel are appointed to ODIs involving ICC Associate Members, ICC Intercontinental Cup matches and other associate tournaments. Some of them may be involved for officiating in ICC events.

For any test match, the ICC appoints three umpires from the panel, who do not belong to the competing teams. For ODI matches, often two neutral umpires are joined with an umpire from the home team belonging to the Elite or International panel. For T20Is, any of the umpires can be appointed from the three panels. However, for ICC events, neutral umpires are appointed for all the formats. The composition of the various panels is revised annually in May, and the umpires, who are part of the panel are contracted to the ICC on a full-time basis. Women's matches often involve women officials. The ICC also undertakes training and development of the umpires. Umpires may occasionally officiate in first-class cricket in the country of their residence.

A match referee from the Elite Panel of ICC Referees is appointed to act as the independent representative of the ICC at all international matches. The role was introduced for the first time during India's tour of Australia in 1991-92. The referees are responsible for enforcing the playing conditions and adherence to the ICC Code of Conduct.

== Rankings ==
Cricket rankings for ODIs were launched independently in 1998. The ICC acquired the same in January 2005 and started publishing it periodically. The Women's rankings were introduced in October 2008. Later, T20I rankings were launched in October 2011. The ICC publishes team rankings for all three formats of the game and updates the same periodically.

Men's

- ICC Men's Test Team Rankings
- ICC Men's ODI Team Rankings
- ICC Men's T20I Team Rankings
- ICC Men's Player Rankings

Women's

- ICC Women's ODI Team Rankings
- ICC Women's T20I Team Rankings
- ICC Women's Player Rankings

== Awards and recognition ==
The ICC Development Awards were established in 2002 to celebrate the world-leading initiatives and innovative programmes delivered by ICC Members to grow the game around the globe. The ICC instituted the annual ICC Awards in 2004 to recognize and honor the best international cricket players of the previous 12 months. The inaugural ICC Awards ceremony was held on 7 September 2004, in London. In 2020, ICC announced a special one-off event, the ICC Awards of the Decade, to honour the best performers and performances in the previous 10 years.

The ICC Cricket Hall of Fame was launched by the ICC on 2 January 2009, in association with the Federation of International Cricketers' Associations, as part of the ICC's centenary celebrations. The initial inductees were the 55 players included in the FICA Hall of Fame which ran from 1999 to 2003, but further members are added each year during the annual ICC Awards ceremony.

== Anti-corruption and security ==
Following betting incidents involving international players, the ICC set up an Anti-Corruption Unit (later renamed as Anti-Corruption and Security Unit) in 2000 under the retired Commissioner of London's Metropolitan Police, Paul Condon. As per Condon, match fixing had been prevalent in cricket since the 1980s. The ICC has often warned players against corruption and stated that the ICC would be vigilant and intolerant against it.

The first high profile case involved match fixing performed by several players of the South African cricket team, during their tour to India in 2000, which resulted in subsequent investigation and punishments handed out to Hansie Cronje, Herschelle Gibbs, and Henry Williams. Indian cricketers Mohammad Azharuddin and Ajay Jadeja, also received bans after being found guilty of match-fixing. Following a scandal that occurred during the Pakistan's tour of England in 2010, three Pakistani players, Mohammad Amir, Mohammad Asif, and Salman Butt were found to be guilty of spot-fixing, and received bans and jail terms. In 2019, an investigation by Al Jazeera revealed various instances of match-fixing in several cricket playing nations.

== Other ventures ==
The ICC Academy is located at Dubai Sports City, and opened in 2010. It includes various cricketing facilities, and practice pitches.

ICC Cricket 360° is a televised weekly show, which covers various aspects and events in the cricketing world.

== Criticism ==
In 2015, Jarrod Kimber and Sam Collins made the documentary Death of a Gentleman based on the internal organisation of the ICC, which portrayed the richer member countries (specifically India, England and Australia) as "bullying" the ICC and running the organisation to the detriment of the other members.

== See also ==
- Association of Cricket Officials
- List of presidents of the International Cricket Council
- World Cricketers' Association
