= Vanuatu Cricket Association =

Sports governing body in Vanuatu

- Sport: Cricket
- Founded: 1978
- Affiliation: International Cricket Council
- Affiliation date: 1995 (as Affiliate Member); 2009 (as Associate Member)
- Regional affiliation: East Asia-Pacific
- Location: Port Vila, Vanuatu
- President: Mark Stafford
- Chairman: Nigel Morrison
- CEO: Tim Cutler
- Coach: Jeremy Bray

Official website
- cricket.vu
- (Vanuatu)

Vanuatu Cricket Association, is the national governing body of the sport of cricket in Vanuatu. Its current headquarters is in Port Vila, Vanuatu. Vanuatu Cricket Association is Vanuatu's representative at the International Cricket Council and is an associate member and has been a member of that body since 2009. It is also a member of the East Asia-Pacific Cricket Council. The Vanuatu men's national cricket team achieved Associate status with the ICC after winning the prestigious ICC EAP Cup in 2009 (undefeated).

In March 2021, Tim Cutler, formerly the CEO of Hong Kong Cricket Association, was appointed as the CEO of Vanuatu Cricket replacing Shane Deitz. He was expected to commence his term as CEO from mid-April 2021.

== History ==
The game of cricket was introduced to the country by English Expatriates during colonization when the country known as the New Hebrides, and has been played in Vanuatu since around 1905.

The Vanuatu Cricket Association began upon affiliation with the International Cricket Council (ICC) in 1995 and later gained associate status in 2005.

The commencement of the Community Cricket Development Program in the year 2000 has been the key component in the growth of cricket in Vanuatu. The program which started with 400 participants in the year 2000, is now rolled out to numerous schools and communities throughout Efate, Espiritu Santo, Malekula and Tanna encouraging many juniors to take up the game.

Vanuatu Cricket also maintains a strong local club competitions structure at both junior and senior levels.

To date Vanuatu Cricket has grown to have roughly 25,000+ participants, approximately 10% of the total population of Vanuatu.

== See also ==
- Vanuatu national cricket team
- Vanuatu women's national cricket team
