= List of Twenty20 International cricket grounds =

List of cricket grounds

This is a list of men's Twenty20 International cricket grounds. A total of 252 cricket grounds have been used since the first Twenty20 International (T20I) match in February 2005. The grounds are listed in the order in which they were first used as a venue for a T20I match. Platinum Oval in Stanley became the 252nd T20I venue when it hosted a series between Falkland Islands and Costa Rica in November 2026.

== List of Twenty20 International grounds ==
As of 21 November 2026 (T20I 4235):

No.	Stadium	City	Country	First match	Last match	No. of T20Is
1	Eden Park	Auckland	(New Zealand) New Zealand	17 February 2005	30 October 2026	34
2	Rose Bowl	Southampton	(England) England	13 June 2005	15 September 2026	15
3	Wanderers Stadium	Johannesburg	(South Africa) South Africa	21 October 2005	31 January 2026	35
4	The Gabba	Brisbane	(Australia) Australia	9 January 2006	8 November 2025	12
5	Bristol County Ground	Bristol	(England) England	28 August 2006	9 July 2026	8
6	Sheikh Abu Naser Stadium	Khulna	(Bangladesh) Bangladesh	28 November 2006	22 January 2016	5
7	Wellington Regional Stadium	Wellington	(New Zealand) New Zealand	22 December 2006	27 October 2026	19
8	Sydney Cricket Ground	Sydney	(Australia) Australia	9 January 2007	16 November 2024	18
9	The Oval	London	(England) England	28 June 2007	30 May 2024	17
10	Gymkhana Club Ground	Nairobi	(Kenya) Kenya	1 September 2007	1 August 2026	38
11	Kingsmead Cricket Ground	Durban	(South Africa) South Africa	12 September 2007	10 December 2024	20
12	Newlands Cricket Ground	Cape Town	(South Africa) South Africa	12 September 2007	1 December 2020	21
13	Brabourne Stadium	Mumbai	(India) India	20 October 2007	20 October 2007	1
14	WACA Ground	Perth	(Australia) Australia	11 December 2007	31 October 2010	2
15	St George's Park Cricket Ground	Gqeberha	(South Africa) South Africa	16 December 2007	10 November 2024	5
16	Melbourne Cricket Ground	Melbourne	(Australia) Australia	1 February 2008	21 November 2026	21
17	Lancaster Park	Christchurch	(New Zealand) New Zealand	7 February 2008	30 December 2010	4
18	National Stadium	Karachi	(Pakistan) Pakistan	20 April 2008	25 September 2022	11
19	Old Trafford Cricket Ground	Manchester	(England) England	13 June 2008	19 September 2026	15
20	Kensington Oval	Bridgetown	(Barbados) Barbados	20 June 2008	10 November 2024	35
21	Stormont	Belfast	(Northern Ireland) Northern Ireland	2 August 2008	28 June 2026	29
22	Maple Leaf North-West Ground	King City	(Canada) Canada	10 October 2008	22 June 2025	26
23	Seddon Park	Hamilton	(New Zealand) New Zealand	28 December 2008	1 November 2026	15
24	R. Premadasa Stadium	Colombo	(Sri Lanka) Sri Lanka	10 February 2009	27 February 2026	57
25	Queen's Park Oval	Port of Spain	(Trinidad and Tobago) Trinidad and Tobago	15 March 2009	2 April 2017	6
26	Centurion Park	Centurion	(South Africa) South Africa	29 March 2009	29 January 2026	17
27	Dubai International Cricket Stadium	Dubai	(United Arab Emirates) United Arab Emirates	7 May 2009	31 January 2026	109
28	Lord's	London	(England) England	5 June 2009	29 July 2018	10
29	Trent Bridge	Nottingham	(England) England	6 June 2009	7 July 2026	15
30	Warner Park Sporting Complex	Basseterre	(Saint Kitts and Nevis) Saint Kitts and Nevis	2 August 2009	28 July 2025	15
31	Vidarbha Cricket Association Stadium	Nagpur	(India) India	9 December 2009	21 January 2026	14
32	Inderjit Singh Bindra Stadium	Mohali	(India) India	12 December 2009	11 January 2023	7
33	Paikiasothy Saravanamuttu Stadium	Colombo	(Sri Lanka) Sri Lanka	1 February 2010	24 November 2014	2
34	Singhalese Sports Club Cricket Ground	Colombo	(Sri Lanka) Sri Lanka	3 February 2010	18 February 2026	7
35	Sheikh Zayed Cricket Stadium	Abu Dhabi	(United Arab Emirates) United Arab Emirates	10 February 2010	23 September 2025	76
36	Bellerive Oval	Hobart	(Australia) Australia	21 February 2010	2 November 2025	15
37	Providence Stadium	Providence	(Guyana) Guyana	30 April 2010	27 June 2024	19
38	Daren Sammy Cricket Ground	Gros Islet	(Saint Lucia) Saint Lucia	1 May 2010	17 November 2024	27
39	Sir Vivian Richards Stadium	North Sound	(Antigua and Barbuda) Antigua and Barbuda	19 May 2010	23 June 2024	21
40	Central Broward Park	Lauderhill	(United States) United States	22 May 2010	3 August 2025	20
41	Harare Sports Club	Harare	(Zimbabwe) Zimbabwe	12 June 2010	26 June 2026	79
42	Edgbaston Cricket Ground	Birmingham	(England) England	5 July 2010	25 May 2024	8
43	Sophia Gardens	Cardiff	(Wales) Wales	5 September 2010	17 September 2026	12
44	Mangaung Oval	Bloemfontein	(South Africa) South Africa	8 October 2010	26 October 2017	2
45	De Beers Diamond Oval	Kimberley	(South Africa) South Africa	10 October 2010	10 October 2010	1
46	Moses Mabhida Stadium	Durban	(South Africa) South Africa	9 January 2011	9 January 2011	1
47	Adelaide Oval	Adelaide	(Australia) Australia	12 January 2011	11 February 2024	13
48	Pallekele International Cricket Stadium	Kandy	(Sri Lanka) Sri Lanka	6 August 2011	28 February 2026	35
49	Sher-e-Bangla National Cricket Stadium	Mirpur	(Bangladesh) Bangladesh	11 October 2011	2 May 2026	67
50	Eden Gardens	Kolkata	(India) India	29 October 2011	4 March 2026	19
51	Stadium Australia	Sydney	(Australia) Australia	1 February 2012	9 November 2014	4
52	Mombasa Sports Club	Mombasa	(Kenya) Kenya	22 February 2012	24 February 2012	3
53	ICC Academy Ground	Dubai	(United Arab Emirates) United Arab Emirates	13 March 2012	20 December 2024	50
54	Mahinda Rajapaksa International Cricket Stadium	Hambantota	(Sri Lanka) Sri Lanka	1 June 2012	6 August 2013	7
55	Sportpark Westvliet	The Hague	(Netherlands) Netherlands	24 July 2012	11 July 2025	22
56	Riverside Ground	Chester-le-Street	(England) England	8 September 2012	1 July 2026	6
57	M. A. Chidambaram Stadium	Chennai	(India) India	11 September 2012	26 February 2026	10
58	Maharashtra Cricket Association Stadium	Pune	(India) India	20 December 2012	31 January 2025	5
59	Wankhede Stadium	Mumbai	(India) India	22 December 2012	5 March 2026	17
60	Buffalo Park	East London	(South Africa) South Africa	23 December 2012	12 February 2020	3
61	M. Chinnaswamy Stadium	Bangalore	(India) India	25 December 2012	17 October 2026	11
62	Narendra Modi Stadium	Ahmedabad	(India) India	28 December 2012	8 March 2026	15
63	Sharjah Cricket Stadium	Sharjah	(United Arab Emirates) United Arab Emirates	3 March 2013	1 November 2026	57
64	Wanderers Cricket Ground	Windhoek	(Namibia) Namibia	19 April 2013	5 October 2024	25
65	Queens Sports Club	Bulawayo	(Zimbabwe) Zimbabwe	11 May 2013	19 July 2026	28
66	Mannofield Park	Aberdeen	(Scotland) Scotland	4 July 2013	5 July 2013	2
67	Arnos Vale Stadium	Kingstown	(Saint Vincent and the Grenadines) Saint Vincent and the Grenadines	27 July 2013	19 December 2024	10
68	Niranjan Shah Stadium	Rajkot	(India) India	10 October 2013	28 January 2025	6
69	Zohur Ahmed Chowdhury Stadium	Chittagong	(Bangladesh) Bangladesh	12 February 2014	21 June 2026	37
70	Sabina Park	Kingston	(Jamaica) Jamaica	19 February 2014	14 June 2026	14
71	Sylhet International Cricket Stadium	Sylhet	(Bangladesh) Bangladesh	17 March 2014	3 September 2025	16
72	Windsor Park	Roseau	(Dominica) Dominica	5 July 2014	3 July 2022	4
73	Gaddafi Stadium	Lahore	(Pakistan) Pakistan	22 May 2015	1 February 2026	31
74	Bready Cricket Club Ground	Magheramason	(Northern Ireland) Northern Ireland	18 June 2015	15 June 2025	13
75	VRA Cricket Ground	Amstelveen	(Netherlands) Netherlands	30 June 2015	5 August 2019	6
76	Hazelaarweg Stadion	Rotterdam	(Netherlands) Netherlands	2 July 2015	25 June 2019	6
77	The Grange Club	Edinburgh	(Scotland) Scotland	9 July 2015	7 September 2024	27
78	Malahide Cricket Club Ground	Dublin	(Republic of Ireland) Ireland	17 July 2015	21 September 2025	20
79	Castle Avenue cricket ground	Dublin	(Republic of Ireland) Ireland	25 July 2015	14 May 2024	6
80	Himachal Pradesh Cricket Association Stadium	Dharamshala	(India) India	2 October 2015	14 December 2025	11
81	Barabati Stadium	Cuttack	(India) India	5 October 2015	9 December 2025	4
82	Bay Oval	Mount Maunganui	(New Zealand) New Zealand	7 January 2016	15 March 2026	19
83	Mission Road Ground	Mong Kok	(Hong Kong) Hong Kong	30 January 2016	1 March 2026	33
84	Riverway Stadium	Townsville	(Australia) Australia	6 February 2016	9 February 2016	3
85	JSCA International Stadium Complex	Ranchi	(India) India	12 February 2016	9 October 2026	5
86	ACA-VDCA Cricket Stadium	Visakhapatnam	(India) India	14 February 2016	28 January 2026	5
87	Khan Shaheb Osman Ali Stadium	Fatullah	(Bangladesh) Bangladesh	19 February 2016	21 February 2016	4
88	Arun Jaitley Stadium	Delhi	(India) India	23 March 2016	17 September 2026	17
89	McLean Park	Napier	(New Zealand) New Zealand	3 January 2017	27 December 2023	6
90	Green Park Stadium	Kanpur	(India) India	26 January 2017	26 January 2017	1
91	Kardinia Park	Geelong	(Australia) Australia	19 February 2017	20 October 2022	7
92	Shaheed Vijay Singh Pathik Sports Complex	Greater Noida	(India) India	8 March 2017	10 March 2020	6
93	County Ground	Taunton	(England) England	23 June 2017	23 June 2017	1
94	Assam Cricket Association Stadium	Guwahati	(India) India	10 October 2017	25 January 2026	5
95	JB Marks Oval	Potchefstroom	(South Africa) South Africa	29 October 2017	12 October 2017	2
96	Greenfield International Stadium	Thiruvananthapuram	(India) India	7 November 2017	31 January 2026	5
97	Holkar Stadium	Indore	(India) India	22 October 2017	11 October 2026	5
98	Saxton Oval	Nelson	(New Zealand) New Zealand	29 December 2017	10 November 2025	5
99	Rajiv Gandhi International Cricket Stadium	Dehradun	(India) India	3 June 2018	24 February 2019	6
100	Sportpark Het Schootsveld	Deventer	(Netherlands) Netherlands	16 June 2018	15 August 2023	7
101	Mohan's Oval (Nursery 2)	Abu Dhabi	(United Arab Emirates) United Arab Emirates	22 October 2018	22 October 2018	1
102	Ekana Cricket Stadium	Lucknow	(India) India	6 November 2018	6 October 2026	7
103	Carrara Stadium	Gold Coast	(Australia) Australia	17 November 2018	6 November 2025	3
104	Oman Cricket Academy Ground (Ministry Turf 1)	Muscat	(Oman) Oman	20 January 2019	17 October 2025	123
105	Oman Cricket Academy Ground (Ministry Turf 2)	Muscat	(Oman) Oman	20 January 2019	15 October 2025	37
106	Amini Park	Port Moresby	(Papua New Guinea) Papua New Guinea	22 March 2019	29 July 2023	18
107	La Manga Club Bottom Ground	Cartagena	(Spain) Spain	29 March 2019	26 February 2023	14
108	Reforma Athletic Club	Naucalpan	(Mexico) Mexico	25 April 2019	5 April 2026	13
109	Royal Brussels Cricket Club	Waterloo	(Belgium) Belgium	11 May 2019	9 June 2024	23
110	Kyambogo Cricket Oval	Kampala	(Uganda) Uganda	20 May 2019	23 May 2019	7
111	Lugogo Stadium	Kampala	(Uganda) Uganda	20 May 2019	22 May 2019	3
112	Sportpark Maarschalkerweerd	Utrecht	(Netherlands) Netherlands	25 May 2019	26 August 2024	6
113	College Field	Saint Peter Port	(Guernsey) Guernsey	31 May 2019	20 May 2022	9
114	King George V Sports Ground	Castel	(Guernsey) Guernsey	1 June 2019	3 May 2026	35
115	Kinrara Academy Oval	Kuala Lumpur	(Malaysia) Malaysia	24 June 2019	26 February 2020	18
116	West End Park International Cricket Stadium	Doha	(Qatar) Qatar	4 July 2019	15 February 2026	73
117	Faleata Oval 1	Apia	(Samoa) Samoa	8 July 2019	13 July 2019	2
118	Faleata Oval 3	Apia	(Samoa) Samoa	9 July 2019	12 July 2019	2
119	Faleata Oval 2	Apia	(Samoa) Samoa	10 July 2019	24 August 2024	15
120	Svanholm Park	Brøndby	(Denmark) Denmark	13 July 2019	14 July 2026	29
121	Indian Association Ground	Singapore	(Singapore) Singapore	22 July 2019	5 July 2022	19
122	Kerava National Cricket Ground	Kerava	(Finland) Finland	17 August 2019	21 August 2026	51
123	White Hill Field	Sandys Parish	(Bermuda) Bermuda	18 August 2019	27 June 2026	23
124	United Ground	Windhoek	(Namibia) Namibia	19 August 2019	30 November 2023	19
125	Bermuda National Stadium	Hamilton	(Bermuda) Bermuda	19 August 2019	7 October 2023	7
126	Moara Vlasiei Cricket Ground	Ilfov County	(Romania) Romania	29 August 2019	30 July 2026	80
127	El Cortijo Polo Club Pitch A Ground	Lima	(Peru) Peru	3 October 2019	5 October 2019	6
128	El Cortijo Polo Club Pitch B Ground	Lima	(Peru) Peru	3 October 2019	5 October 2019	4
129	Lima Cricket and Football Club	Lima	(Peru) Peru	6 October 2019	6 October 2019	1
130	Marina Ground	Corfu	(Greece) Greece	14 October 2019	18 October 2019	4
131	Marsa Sports Club	Marsa	(Malta) Malta	18 October 2019	9 May 2026	68
132	ICC Academy Ground No 2	Dubai	(United Arab Emirates) United Arab Emirates	19 October 2019	23 October 2019	5
133	Tolerance Oval (Nursery 1)	Abu Dhabi	(United Arab Emirates) United Arab Emirates	20 October 2019	27 October 2019	8
134	Hagley Oval	Christchurch	(New Zealand) New Zealand	1 November 2019	24 October 2026	17
135	Manuka Oval	Canberra	(Australia) Australia	5 November 2019	29 October 2025	6
136	Lilongwe Golf Club	Lilongwe	(Malawi) Malawi	6 November 2019	7 November 2019	4
137	Perth Stadium	Perth	(Australia) Australia	8 November 2019	13 February 2024	8
138	Indian Sports Club	Blantyre	(Malawi) Malawi	9 November 2019	9 November 2019	2
139	Saint Andrews International High School	Blantyre	(Malawi) Malawi	10 November 2019	10 November 2019	1
140	Tribhuvan University International Cricket Ground	Kirtipur	(Nepal) Nepal	5 December 2019	21 April 2026	36
141	Rajiv Gandhi International Cricket Stadium	Hyderabad	(India) India	6 December 2019	14 October 2026	4
142	National Cricket Stadium	St. George's	(Grenada) Grenada	15 January 2020	16 December 2023	8
143	Terdthai Cricket Ground	Bangkok	(Thailand) Thailand	29 February 2020	28 February 2026	57
144	Desert Springs Cricket Ground	Almería	(Spain) Spain	8 March 2020	6 November 2022	29
145	Pierre Werner Cricket Ground	Walferdange	(Luxembourg) Luxembourg	28 August 2020	22 June 2025	13
146	Vasil Levski National Sports Academy	Sofia	(Bulgaria) Bulgaria	23 September 2020	13 July 2025	31
147	Rawalpindi Cricket Stadium	Rawalpindi	(Pakistan) Pakistan	7 November 2020	13 October 2026	19
148	Boland Park	Paarl	(South Africa) South Africa	29 November 2020	27 January 2026	2
149	University of Otago Oval	Dunedin	(New Zealand) New Zealand	25 February 2021	13 November 2025	5
150	Coolidge Cricket Ground	Saint George	(Antigua and Barbuda) Antigua and Barbuda	3 March 2021	14 November 2021	15
151	Vinoř Cricket Ground (Scott Page Field)	Prague	(Czech Republic) Czech Republic	21 May 2021	28 June 2026	27
152	Headingley Cricket Ground	Leeds	(England) England	18 July 2021	18 July 2021	1
153	Bayer Uerdingen Cricket Ground	Krefeld	(Germany) Germany	5 August 2021	3 May 2026	43
154	Gahanga International Cricket Stadium	Kigali	(Rwanda) Rwanda	18 August 2021	19 September 2026	137
155	Santarem Cricket Ground	Santarém	(Portugal) Portugal	19 August 2021	9 April 2026	21
156	Entebbe Cricket Oval	Entebbe	(Uganda) Uganda	10 September 2021	27 July 2025	22
157	Happy Valley Ground 1	Episkopi	(Cyprus) Cyprus	5 October 2021	23 May 2026	30
158	IPRC Ground	Kigali	(Rwanda) Rwanda	16 October 2021	9 December 2022	44
159	University of Lagos Cricket Oval	Lagos	(Nigeria) Nigeria	19 October 2021	26 October 2021	6
160	Sawai Mansingh Stadium	Jaipur	(India) India	17 November 2021	17 November 2021	1
161	Jimmy Powell Oval	George Town	(Cayman Islands) Cayman Islands	13 April 2022	27 September 2026	33
162	Smith Road Oval	George Town	(Cayman Islands) Cayman Islands	16 April 2022	17 April 2022	3
163	Seebarn Cricket Ground	Lower Austria	(Austria) Austria	4 June 2022	26 May 2024	7
164	Ghent Oval	Ghent	(Belgium) Belgium	11 June 2022	1 July 2022	8
165	UKM-YSD Cricket Oval	Bangi	(Malaysia) Malaysia	2 July 2022	14 October 2026	49
166	Lisicji Jarak Cricket Ground	Belgrade	(Serbia) Serbia	8 July 2022	8 June 2025	6
167	Bulawayo Athletic Club	Bulawayo	(Zimbabwe) Zimbabwe	11 July 2022	17 July 2022	10
168	Tikkurila Cricket Ground	Vantaa	(Finland) Finland	12 July 2022	21 August 2026	36
169	Malkerns Country Club Oval	Malkerns	(Eswatini) Eswatini	29 July 2022	7 June 2026	26
170	Brian Lara Cricket Academy	San Fernando	(Trinidad and Tobago) Trinidad and Tobago	29 July 2022	27 August 2024	12
171	Vanuatu Cricket Ground	Port Vila	(Vanuatu) Vanuatu	9 September 2022	15 September 2022	12
172	Willowmoore Park	Benoni	(South Africa) South Africa	15 September 2022	19 December 2023	46
173	Sano International Cricket Ground	Sano	(Japan) Japan	9 October 2022	22 September 2026	40
174	Annadil Burhani Ground	Dar es Salaam	(Tanzania) Tanzania	31 October 2022	6 November 2022	5
175	St Albans Club	Buenos Aires	(Argentina) Argentina	21 February 2023	30 November 2025	18
176	Belgrano Athletic Club Ground	Buenos Aires	(Argentina) Argentina	22 February 2023	15 December 2024	10
177	Hurlingham Club Ground	Buenos Aires	(Argentina) Argentina	25 February 2023	15 December 2024	15
178	Albert Park Ground 1	Suva	(Fiji) Fiji	13 March 2023	18 March 2023	4
179	Albert Park Ground 2	Suva	(Fiji) Fiji	17 March 2023	17 March 2023	1
180	Queenstown Events Centre	Queenstown	(New Zealand) New Zealand	8 April 2023	8 April 2023	1
181	AZ Group Cricket Oval	Phnom Penh	(Cambodia) Cambodia	1 May 2023	11 May 2023	8
182	Europa Sports Park	Gibraltar	(Gibraltar) Gibraltar	4 May 2023	30 September 2024	17
183	Solvangs Park	Glostrup	(Denmark) Denmark	18 May 2023	21 May 2023	5
184	Farmers Cricket Club Ground	St Martin	(Jersey) Jersey	7 July 2023	8 July 2023	2
185	King William's College	Castletown	(Isle of Man) Isle of Man	9 July 2023	10 July 2023	3
186	Goldenacre Sports Ground	Edinburgh	(Scotland) Scotland	20 July 2023	28 July 2023	8
187	Bayuemas Oval	Pandamaran	(Malaysia) Malaysia	26 July 2023	14 October 2026	90
188	GB Oval	Sződliget	(Hungary) Hungary	5 August 2023	28 June 2026	22
189	Zhejiang University of Technology Cricket Field	Hangzhou	(China) China	27 September 2023	7 October 2023	17
190	Tafawa Balewa Square Cricket Oval	Lagos	(Nigeria) Nigeria	4 October 2023	27 September 2026	25
191	Mulpani International Cricket Ground	Kageshwari-Manohara	(Nepal) Nepal	18 October 2023	3 November 2023	13
192	St. George's College Ground 1	Quilmes	(Argentina) Argentina	18 October 2023	16 December 2024	12
193	Udayana Cricket Ground	Jimbaran	(Indonesia) Indonesia	20 November 2023	13 April 2026	80
194	SVNS International Cricket Stadium	Raipur	(India) India	1 December 2023	23 January 2026	2
195	Rangiri Dambulla International Stadium	Dambulla	(Sri Lanka) Sri Lanka	17 February 2024	11 January 2026	11
196	UDST Cricket Ground	Doha	(Qatar) Qatar	27 February 2024	13 November 2025	12
197	Achimota Senior Secondary School B Field	Accra	(Ghana) Ghana	17 March 2024	28 March 2026	12
198	Achimota Senior Secondary School A Field	Accra	(Ghana) Ghana	21 March 2024	28 March 2026	8
199	Prairie View Cricket Complex	Houston	(United States) United States	7 April 2024	25 May 2024	7
200	Los Reyes Polo Club	Guácima	(Costa Rica) Costa Rica	11 April 2024	13 March 2025	11
201	La Manga Club Top Ground	Cartagena	(Spain) Spain	14 April 2024	7 December 2025	7
202	Dreux Sport Cricket Club	Dreux	(France) France	9 May 2024	12 May 2024	7
203	Grand Prairie Stadium	Dallas	(United States) United States	1 June 2024	20 October 2024	7
204	Nassau County International Cricket Stadium	East Meadow	(United States) United States	3 June 2024	12 June 2024	8
205	Roma Cricket Ground	Rome	(Italy) Italy	9 June 2024	16 June 2024	12
206	Simar Cricket Ground	Rome	(Italy) Italy	9 June 2024	16 June 2024	12
207	Guernsey Rovers Athletic Club Ground	Port Soif	(Guernsey) Guernsey	23 June 2024	28 August 2024	13
208	Sikh Union Club Ground	Nairobi	(Kenya) Kenya	28 June 2024	18 October 2024	14
209	Valburga Cricket Ground	Smlednik	(Slovenia) Slovenia	29 June 2024	30 June 2024	3
210	Mladost Cricket Ground	Zagreb	(Croatia) Croatia	2 August 2024	8 August 2025	9
211	Selangor Turf Club	Kuala Lumpur	(Malaysia) Malaysia	21 August 2024	14 October 2026	17
212	Gymkhana Club Ground	Dar es Salaam	(Tanzania) Tanzania	21 September 2024	26 September 2024	8
213	University of Dar es Salaam Ground	Dar es Salaam	(Tanzania) Tanzania	21 September 2024	26 September 2024	7
214	Yeonhui Cricket Ground	Incheon	(South Korea) South Korea	25 September 2024	5 October 2026	18
215	Shrimant Madhavrao Scindia Cricket Stadium	Gwalior	(India) India	6 October 2024	6 October 2024	1
216	TCA Oval	Blantyre	(Malawi) Malawi	9 October 2024	16 August 2026	26
217	Sao Fernando Polo and Cricket Club	Itaguaí	(Brazil) Brazil	13 October 2024	2 November 2025	3
218	Gelephu International Cricket Ground	Gelephu	(Bhutan) Bhutan	19 October 2024	29 December 2025	19
219	Ruaraka Sports Club Ground	Nairobi	(Kenya) Kenya	19 October 2024	24 October 2024	6
220	Jinja Cricket Ground	Jinja	(Uganda) Uganda	28 October 2024	29 October 2024	2
221	Nigeria Cricket Federation Oval 1	Abuja	(Nigeria) Nigeria	23 November 2024	25 October 2026	37
222	Nigeria Cricket Federation Oval 2	Abuja	(Nigeria) Nigeria	23 November 2024	25 October 2026	13
223	Singapore National Cricket Ground	Singapore	(Singapore) Singapore	28 February 2025	26 June 2026	37
224	Namibia Cricket Ground	Windhoek	(Namibia) Namibia	19 March 2025	6 September 2026	20
225	Clayton	Panama City	(Panama) Panama	17 April 2025	19 April 2025	7
226	Velden Cricket Ground	Latschach	(Austria) Austria	17 May 2025	24 August 2025	10
227	Ballpark Ground	Graz	(Austria) Austria	18 May 2025	18 May 2025	2
228	Stars Arena	Hofstade	(Belgium) Belgium	30 May 2025	1 June 2025	7
229	Grainville Cricket Ground	Saint Saviour	(Jersey) Jersey	6 June 2025	7 June 2025	3
230	Maple Leaf North-East Ground	King City	(Canada) Canada	11 June 2025	13 June 2025	5
231	Ishoj Cricket Club	Ishøj	(Denmark) Denmark	13 June 2025	15 June 2025	5
232	Koge Cricket Club	Køge	(Denmark) Denmark	14 June 2025	14 July 2026	12
233	Titwood	Glasgow	(Scotland) Scotland	15 June 2025	20 June 2025	6
234	Estonian National Cricket and Rugby Field	Tallinn	(Estonia) Estonia	25 July 2025	3 August 2025	6
235	Botkyrka Cricket Center	Stockholm	(Sweden) Sweden	7 August 2025	2 July 2026	19
236	Marrara Oval	Darwin	(Australia) Australia	10 August 2025	12 August 2025	2
237	Cazaly's Stadium	Cairns	(Australia) Australia	16 August 2025	16 August 2025	1
238	Stubberudmyra Cricket Ground	Oslo	(Norway) Norway	17 August 2025	17 August 2025	3
239	Cronkbourne Sports and Social Club Ground	Tromode	(Isle of Man) Isle of Man	6 September 2025	6 September 2025	2
240	Takashinga Cricket Club	Harare	(Zimbabwe) Zimbabwe	26 September 2025	4 October 2025	10
241	Happy Valley Ground 2	Episkopi	(Cyprus) Cyprus	31 October 2025	23 May 2026	22
242	Sao Fernando Polo and Cricket Club (Campo Sede)	Itaguaí	(Brazil) Brazil	30 October 2025	31 October 2025	2
243	Maharaja Yadavindra Singh International Cricket Stadium	New Chandigarh	(India) India	11 December 2025	11 December 2025	1
244	The Sevens Stadium	Dubai	(United Arab Emirates) United Arab Emirates	23 January 2026	26 January 2026	3
245	Botswana Cricket Association Oval 1	Gaborone	(Botswana) Botswana	9 March 2026	30 May 2026	16
246	Kōrogi Sports Park	Nisshin	(Japan) Japan	8 May 2026	3 October 2026	15
247	Sano International Cricket Ground 2	Sano	(Japan) Japan	12 May 2026	18 May 2026	6
248	Botswana Cricket Association Oval 2	Gaborone	(Botswana) Botswana	23 May 2026	30 May 2026	10
249	Los Pinos Polo Club 1	Cundinamarca	(Colombia) Colombia	6 August 2026	9 August 2026	6
250	Los Pinos Polo Club 2	Cundinamarca	(Colombia) Colombia	8 August 2026	8 August 2026	1
251	Gahanga B Ground	Kigali	(Rwanda) Rwanda	8 September 2026	13 September 2026	12
252	Platinum Oval	Stanley	(Falkland Islands) Falkland Islands	15 November 2026	18 November 2026	8

== Grounds by country ==
List of grounds by country as of 21 November 2026 (T20I 4235). (Note: Cricinfo groups the individual countries of the West Indies together, but these have been separated for this list. ESPNcricinfo also counts Welsh grounds under England and grounds from the Republic of Ireland and Northern Ireland together under Ireland; these have also been separated for this list.)

Country	No. of grounds	Location of first match	City	Date of first match	No. of T20Is
(Antigua and Barbuda) Antigua and Barbuda	2	Sir Vivian Richards Stadium	North Sound	19 May 2010	36
(Argentina) Argentina	4	St Albans Club	Buenos Aires	21 February 2023	55
(Australia) Australia	14	The Gabba	Brisbane	9 January 2006	116
(Austria) Austria	3	Seebarn Cricket Ground	Lower Austria	4 June 2022	19
(Bangladesh) Bangladesh	5	Khulna Divisional Stadium	Khulna	28 November 2006	129
(Barbados) Barbados	1	Kensington Oval	Bridgetown	20 June 2008	35
(Belgium) Belgium	3	Royal Brussels Cricket Club	Waterloo	11 May 2019	38
(Bermuda) Bermuda	2	White Hill Field	Sandys Parish	18 August 2019	30
(Bhutan) Bhutan	1	Gelephu International Cricket Ground	Gelephu	19 October 2024	19
(Botswana) Botswana	2	Botswana Cricket Association Oval 1	Gaborone	9 March 2026	26
(Brazil) Brazil	2	Sao Fernando Polo and Cricket Club	Itaguaí	12 October 2024	5
(Bulgaria) Bulgaria	1	Vasil Levski National Sports Academy	Sofia	23 September 2020	31
(Cambodia) Cambodia	1	AZ Group Cricket Oval	Phnom Penh	1 May 2023	8
(Canada) Canada	2	Maple Leaf North-West Ground	Toronto	10 October 2008	31
(Cayman Islands) Cayman Islands	2	Jimmy Powell Oval	George Town	13 April 2022	36
(China) China	1	Zhejiang University of Technology Cricket Field	Hangzhou	27 September 2023	17
(Colombia) Colombia	2	Los Pinos Polo Club 1	Cundinamarca	6 August 2026	7
(Costa Rica) Costa Rica	1	Los Reyes Polo Club	Guácima	11 April 2024	11
(Croatia) Croatia	1	Mladost Cricket Ground	Zagreb	2 August 2024	9
(Cyprus) Cyprus	2	Happy Valley Ground	Episkopi	5 October 2021	52
(Czech Republic) Czech Republic	1	Vinoř Cricket Ground (Scott Page Field)	Prague	21 May 2021	27
(Denmark) Denmark	4	Svanholm Park	Brøndby	13 July 2019	51
(Dominica) Dominica	1	Windsor Park	Roseau	5 July 2014	4
(England) England	10	Rose Bowl	Southampton	13 June 2005	96
(Estonia) Estonia	1	Estonian National Cricket and Rugby Field	Tallinn	25 July 2025	6
(Eswatini) Eswatini	1	Malkerns Country Club Oval	Malkerns	29 July 2022	26
(Falkland Islands) Falkland Islands	1	Platinum Oval	Stanley	15 November 2026	8
(Fiji) Fiji	2	Albert Park Ground 1	Suva	13 March 2023	5
(Finland) Finland	2	Kerava National Cricket Ground	Kerava	17 August 2019	87
(France) France	1	Dreux Sport Cricket Club	Dreux	9 May 2024	7
(Germany) Germany	1	Bayer Uerdingen Cricket Ground	Krefeld	5 August 2021	43
(Ghana) Ghana	2	Achimota Oval	Accra	17 March 2024	20
(Gibraltar) Gibraltar	1	Europa Sports Park	Gibraltar	4 May 2023	17
(Greece) Greece	1	Marina Ground	Corfu	14 October 2019	4
(Grenada) Grenada	1	National Cricket Stadium	St. George's	15 January 2020	8
(Guernsey) Guernsey	3	College Field	Saint Peter Port	31 May 2019	57
(Guyana) Guyana	1	Providence Stadium	Providence	30 April 2010	19
(Hong Kong) Hong Kong	1	Mission Road Ground	Hong Kong	30 January 2016	33
(Hungary) Hungary	1	GB Oval	Sződliget	5 August 2023	22
(India) India	27	Brabourne Stadium	Mumbai	20 October 2007	191
(Indonesia) Indonesia	1	Udayana Cricket Ground	Jimbaran	20 November 2023	80
(Republic of Ireland) Ireland	2	Malahide Cricket Club Ground	Dublin	17 July 2015	26
(Isle of Man) Isle of Man	2	King William's College	Castletown	9 July 2023	5
(Italy) Italy	2	Roma Cricket Ground	Rome	9 June 2024	24
(Jamaica) Jamaica	1	Sabina Park	Kingston	19 February 2014	14
(Japan) Japan	3	Sano International Cricket Ground	Sano	9 October 2022	61
(Jersey) Jersey	2	Farmers Cricket Club Ground	St Martin	7 July 2023	5
(Kenya) Kenya	4	Gymkhana Club Ground	Nairobi	1 September 2007	61
(Luxembourg) Luxembourg	1	Pierre Werner Cricket Ground	Walferdange	28 August 2020	13
(Malawi) Malawi	4	Lilongwe Golf Club	Lilongwe	6 November 2019	33
(Malaysia) Malaysia	4	Kinrara Academy Oval	Kuala Lumpur	24 June 2019	174
(Malta) Malta	1	Marsa Sports Club	Marsa	17 October 2019	68
(Mexico) Mexico	1	Reforma Athletic Club	Naucalpan	25 April 2019	13
(Namibia) Namibia	3	Wanderers Cricket Ground	Windhoek	19 April 2013	64
(Nepal) Nepal	2	Tribhuvan University Stadium	Kirtipur	5 December 2019	49
(Netherlands) Netherlands	5	Sportpark Westvliet	The Hague	24 July 2012	47
(New Zealand) New Zealand	10	Eden Park	Auckland	17 February 2005	125
(Nigeria) Nigeria	4	University of Lagos Cricket Oval	Lagos	19 October 2021	81
(Northern Ireland) Northern Ireland	2	Civil Service Cricket Club Ground	Belfast	2 August 2008	40
(Norway) Norway	1	Stubberudmyra Cricket Ground	Oslo	17 August 2025	3
(Oman) Oman	2	Oman Cricket Academy Ground	Muscat	24 January 2019	160
(Pakistan) Pakistan	3	National Stadium	Karachi	20 April 2008	60
(Panama) Panama	1	Clayton	Panama City	17 April 2025	7
(Papua New Guinea) Papua New Guinea	1	Amini Park	Port Moresby	22 March 2019	18
(Peru) Peru	3	El Cortijo Polo Club Pitch A Ground	Lima	3 October 2019	11
(Portugal) Portugal	1	Santarem Cricket Ground	Santarém	19 August 2021	21
(Qatar) Qatar	2	West End Park International Cricket Stadium	Doha	5 July 2019	85
(Romania) Romania	1	Moara Vlasiei Cricket Ground	Ilfov County	29 August 2019	80
(Rwanda) Rwanda	3	Gahanga International Cricket Stadium	Kigali	18 August 2021	193
(Saint Kitts and Nevis) Saint Kitts and Nevis	1	Warner Park	Basseterre	2 August 2009	15
(Saint Lucia) Saint Lucia	1	Beausejour Stadium	Gros Islet	1 May 2010	27
(Saint Vincent and the Grenadines) Saint Vincent and the Grenadines	1	Arnos Vale Stadium	Kingstown	27 July 2013	10
(Samoa) Samoa	3	Faleata Oval 1	Apia	8 July 2019	17
(Scotland) Scotland	4	Mannofield Park	Aberdeen	4 July 2013	43
(Serbia) Serbia	1	Lisicji Jarak Cricket Ground	Belgrade	8 July 2022	6
(Singapore) Singapore	2	Indian Association Ground	Singapore	22 July 2019	56
(Slovenia) Slovenia	1	Valburga Cricket Ground	Smlednik	29 June 2024	3
(South Africa) South Africa	12	New Wanderers Stadium	Johannesburg	21 October 2005	155
(South Korea) South Korea	1	Yeonhui Cricket Ground	Incheon	25 September 2024	18
(Spain) Spain	3	La Manga Club	Cartagena	29 March 2019	50
(Sri Lanka) Sri Lanka	6	Ranasinghe Premadasa Stadium	Colombo	10 February 2009	119
(Sweden) Sweden	1	Botkyrka Cricket Center	Stockholm	7 August 2025	19
(Tanzania) Tanzania	3	Annadil Burhani Ground	Dar es Salaam	31 October 2022	20
(Thailand) Thailand	1	Terdthai Cricket Ground	Bangkok	29 February 2020	57
(Trinidad and Tobago) Trinidad and Tobago	2	Queen's Park Oval	Port of Spain	15 March 2009	18
(Uganda) Uganda	4	Kyambogo Cricket Oval	Kampala	20 May 2019	34
(United Arab Emirates) United Arab Emirates	8	Dubai International Cricket Stadium	Dubai	7 May 2009	309
(United States) United States	4	Central Broward Regional Park	Lauderhill	22 May 2010	42
(Vanuatu) Vanuatu	1	Independence Park	Vanuatu	9 September 2022	12
(Wales) Wales	1	Sophia Gardens	Cardiff	5 September 2010	12
(Zimbabwe) Zimbabwe	4	Harare Sports Club	Harare	12 June 2010	127

== See also ==
- List of Test cricket grounds
- List of One Day International cricket grounds
- List of women's Twenty20 International cricket grounds
- List of cricket grounds by capacity
