= Mozambican cricket team in Eswatini in 2022 =

International cricket tournament

The Mozambican Cricket Association sent teams to Eswatini in July 2022 to play six men's Twenty20 International (T20I) and six Women's Twenty20 International (WT20I) matches. These were the first official T20I and WT20I matches to be played in Eswatini. The men's series was played at Malkerns Country Club Oval in Malkerns, with Mozambique winning 6–0 against a new-look Eswatini side. The women's series was played at Enjabulweni Cricket Ground in Manzini and was also won 6–0 by the tourists.

== Men's series ==
Mozambique men's cricket team in Eswatini in 2022
	Eswatini	Mozambique
- Dates: 29 – 31 July 2022
Captains	Melusi Magagula	Filipe Cossa

Twenty20 International series
- Results: Mozambique won the 6-match series 6–0
Most runs	Haris Rashid (102)	Jose Bulele (178)
Most wickets	Melusi Magagula (6)	Joao Hou (12)

=== Squads ===
Eswatini	Mozambique
Melusi Magagula (c); Buhle Dlamini; Loyiso Dlamini; Wandile Dlamini; Mancoba Jele; Siphesihle Kubheka; Delisa Malinga; Hamilton Nyakatawa; Tahir Patel; Eric Phiri; Haris Rashid; Musa Twala (wk); Lindinkosi Zulu (wk)	Filipe Cossa (c); Jose Bulele; Frederico Carava; Francisco Couana; Santana Dima; Last Emilio (wk); Gomes Gomes; Joao Hou; Jose Joao; Zefanias Matsinhe; Agostinho Navicha; Lourenco Salomone; Lourenco Simango; Vieira Tembo (wk)

=== 1st T20I ===
29 July 2022
09:00
Scorecard

Eswatini; 123/8 (20 overs)	v	Mozambique; 124/2 (15 overs)
Haris Rashid 38 (37); Joao Hou 2/21 (4 overs)		Francisco Couana 49 (31); Tahir Patel 1/20 (4 overs)

Mozambique won by 8 wickets
Malkerns Country Club Oval, Malkerns
Umpires: Sumaila Muguaua (Moz) and Zia Uddin (Esw)
Player of the match: Francisco Couana (Moz)

- Eswatini won the toss and elected to bat.
- Buhle Dlamini, Loyiso Dlamini, Delisa Malinga, Hamilton Nyakatawa, Tahir Patel, Eric Phiri, Haris Rashid and Musa Twala (Esw) all made their T20I debuts.

=== 2nd T20I ===
29 July 2022
13:00
Scorecard

Eswatini; 59 (12.3 overs)	v	Mozambique; 60/3 (10.5 overs)
Buhle Dlamini 10 (11); Zefanias Matsinhe 4/13 (3 overs)		Jose Bulele 26 (27); Mancoba Jele 2/19 (3 overs)

Mozambique won by 7 wickets
Malkerns Country Club Oval, Malkerns
Umpires: Sumaila Muguaua (Moz) and Zia Uddin (Esw)
Player of the match: Zefanias Matsinhe (Moz)

- Eswatini won the toss and elected to bat.
- Wandile Dlamini (Esw) made his T20I debut.

=== 3rd T20I ===
30 July 2022
09:00
Scorecard

Eswatini; 61 (16.2 overs)	v	Mozambique; 64/2 (7.2 overs)
Haris Rashid 30 (43); Joao Hou 4/11 (4 overs)		Francisco Couana 17* (16); Haris Rashid 1/12 (2 overs)

Mozambique won by 8 wickets
Malkerns Country Club Oval, Malkerns
Umpires: Sumaila Muguaua (Moz) and Zia Uddin (Esw)
Player of the match: Joao Hou (Moz)

- Eswatini won the toss and elected to bat.

=== 4th T20I ===
30 July 2022
13:00
Scorecard

Mozambique; 190/5 (20 overs)	v	Eswatini; 95 (18.2 overs)
Gomes Gomes 52 (31); Melusi Magagula 3/33 (4 overs)		Lindinkosi Zulu 20 (30); Joao Hou 3/16 (3 overs)

Mozambique won by 95 runs
Malkerns Country Club Oval, Malkerns
Umpires: Sumaila Muguaua (Moz) and Zia Uddin (Esw)
Player of the match: Joao Hou (Moz)

- Eswatini won the toss and elected to field.

=== 5th T20I ===
31 July 2022
09:00
Scorecard

Mozambique; 207/5 (20 overs)	v	Eswatini; 113/8 (20 overs)
Filipe Cossa 68 (29); Haris Rashid 2/26 (4 overs)		Hamilton Nyakatawa 28 (53); Jose Bulele 3/22 (3 overs)

Mozambique won by 94 runs
Malkerns Country Club Oval, Malkerns
Umpires: Sumaila Muguaua (Moz) and Zia Uddin (Esw)
Player of the match: Jose Bulele (Moz)

- Mozambique won the toss and elected to bat.
- Jose Joao (Moz) made his T20I debut.

=== 6th T20I ===
31 July 2022
13:00
Scorecard

Mozambique; 164/6 (20 overs)	v	Eswatini; 121 (19.1 overs)
Gomes Gomes 37 (30); Delisa Malinga 4/28 (4 overs)		Melusi Magagula 21* (16); Jose Bulele 3/25 (4 overs)

Mozambique won by 43 runs
Malkerns Country Club Oval, Malkerns
Umpires: Sumaila Muguaua (Moz) and Zia Uddin (Esw)
Player of the match: Jose Bulele (Moz)

- Mozambique won the toss and elected to bat.
- Lourenco Salomone (Moz) made his T20I debut.

== Women's series ==
Mozambique women's cricket team in Eswatini in 2022
	Eswatini	Mozambique
- Dates: 29 – 31 July 2022
Captains	Ntombizonke Mkhatshwa (Note: Ntombizodwa Mkhatshwa captained Mozambique for the 6th WT20I.)	Palmira Cuinica (Note: Amelia Mundundo captained Mozambique for the 6th WT20I.)

Twenty20 International series
- Results: Mozambique won the 6-match series 6–0
Most runs	Mbali Dlamini (41)	Palmira Cuinica (167)
Most wickets	Mbali Dlamini (6)	Dalciesia Duvane (9); Palmira Cuinica (9)

=== Squads ===
Eswatini	Mozambique
Ntombizonke Mkhatshwa (c); Dumsile Dlamini; Mbali Dlamini; Njabuliso Dlamini; Phindo Dlamini (wk); Winile Ginindza; Siphesihle Khoza; Nombuso Khumalo; Nokulunga Mabuza; Nomvuyo Magagula; Mawilsia May; Ntombizodwa Mkhatshwa; Zakithi Mkhwanazi; Nonduduzo Nyoni; Bathobile Shongwe (wk); Lihle Thobela	Olga Matsolo (c); Isabel Chuma; Palmira Cuinica (wk); Dalciesia Duvana; Raquel Duvane (wk); Sheila Guambe; Fatima Guirrugo; Ruth Liasse; Isabel Mabunda; Cristina Magaia; Abelina Moiane; Sochana Mujovo; Irene Mulhovo; Amelia Mundundo; Angelica Salomao; Fernanda Arlinda Zavala

=== 1st WT20I ===
29 July 2022
09:00
Scorecard

Mozambique; 169/4 (20 overs)	v	Eswatini; 41 (14.2 overs)
Palmira Cuinica 67 (58); Winile Ginindza 1/15 (2 overs)		Ntombizodwa Mkhatshwa 11 (20); Cristina Magaia 3/7 (4 overs)

Mozambique won by 128 runs
Enjabulweni Cricket Ground, Manzini
Umpires: Zenzele Mazibuko (Esw) and Bernardo Simango (Moz)
Player of the match: Palmira Cuinica (Moz)

- Mozambique won the toss and elected to bat.
- Njabuliso Dlamini, Zakithi Mkhwanazi (Esw), Dalciesia Duvana, Raquel Duvane, Abelina Moiane and Irene Mulhovo (Moz) all made their WT20I debuts.

=== 2nd WT20I ===
29 July 2022
13:00
Scorecard

Eswatini; 70/9 (20 overs)	v	Mozambique; 72/1 (7.2 overs)
Winile Ginindza 7 (17); Olga Matsolo 3/9 (4 overs)		Palmira Cuinica 22 (13); Ntombizonke MKhatshwa 1/18 (3 overs)

Mozambique won by 9 wickets
Enjabulweni Cricket Ground, Manzini
Umpires: Zenzele Mazibuko (Esw) and Bernardo Simango (Moz)
Player of the match: Olga Matsolo (Moz)

- Mozambique won the toss and elected to field.
- Nonduduzo Nyoni (Esw) and Ruth Liasse (Moz) both made their WT20I debuts.

=== 3rd WT20I ===
30 July 2022
09:00
Scorecard

Mozambique; 157/2 (20 overs)	v	Eswatini; 52 (13 overs)
Fatima Guirrugo 59* (65); Mbali Dlamini 1/21 (4 overs)		Mbali Dlamini 15 (17); Palmira Cuinica 3/8 (4 overs)

Mozambique won by 105 runs
Enjabulweni Cricket Ground, Manzini
Umpires: Zenzele Mazibuko (Esw) and Bernardo Simango (Moz)
Player of the match: Palmira Cuinica (Moz)

- Eswatini won the toss and elected to field.
- Siphesihle Khoza (Esw), Isabel Mabunda and Amelia Mundundo (Moz) all made their WT20I debuts.

=== 4th WT20I ===
30 July 2022
13:00
Scorecard

Mozambique; 219/4 (20 overs)	v	Eswatini; 48/5 (14.4 overs)
Fatima Guirrugo 68* (68); Ntombizonke Mkhatshwa 2/31 (4 overs)		Mbali Dlamini 12 (22); Dalciesia Duvane 1/3 (1.4 overs)

Mozambique won by 107 runs (DLS method)
Enjabulweni Cricket Ground, Manzini
Umpires: Zenzele Mazibuko (Esw) and Bernardo Simango (Moz)
Player of the match: Fatima Guirrugo (Moz)

- Mozambique won the toss and elected to bat.
- No further play was possible due ro rain.
- Bathobile Shongwe (Esw) and Fernanda Arlinda Zavala (Moz) both made their WT20I debuts.

=== 5th WT20I ===
31 July 2022
09:00
Scorecard

Eswatini; 82/9 (20 overs)	v	Mozambique; 84/7 (13.3 overs)
Nomvuyo Magagula 10 (27); Fatima Guirrugo 2/8 (2 overs)		Abelina Moiane 20 (26); Mbali Dlamini 3/26 (4 overs)

Mozambique won by 3 wickets
Enjabulweni Cricket Ground, Manzini
Umpires: Zenzele Mazibuko (Esw) and Bernardo Simango (Moz)
Player of the match: Cristina Magaia (Moz)

- Eswatini won the toss and elected to bat.
- Lihle Thobela (Esw) and Sochana Mujovo (Moz) both made their WT20I debuts.

=== 6th WT20I ===
31 July 2022
13:00
Scorecard

Eswatini; 62/8 (20 overs)	v	Mozambique; 63/3 (9 overs)
Phindo Dlamini 14* (20); Amelia Mundundo 3/14 (4 overs)		Irene Mulhovo 17 (19); Zakithi Mkhwanazi 2/4 (1 over)

Mozambique won by 7 wickets
Enjabulweni Cricket Ground, Manzini
Umpires: Zenzele Mazibuko (Esw) and Bernardo Simango (Moz)
Player of the match: Amelia Mundundo (Moz)

- Mozambique won the toss and elected to field.
