= Cricket in Morocco =

- Country: Morocco
- National team(s): Morocco

International competitions
- Cricket World Cup; ICC World Twenty20; ICC Champions Trophy; Women's Cricket World Cup; Under-19 Cricket World Cup

Cricket is a minor sport in Morocco. Cricket was first introduced to the country in 1991, and the Royal Moroccan Cricket Federation became an affiliate member of the International Cricket Council (ICC) in 1999 but in 2019 they were expelled from ICC owing to breach in membership criteria.

== History ==
The Moroccan national team was made by former Test Cricketers Surinder and Mohinder Amarnath in 2002 in a project that was funded by businessman Abdul Rahman Bukhatir. They were on a 3-year contract which ended well as they successfully managed to coach and create a well trained national team for Morocco.

Surinder Amarnath was involved in the development of the team and was responsible for coaching and training the boys who later formed the first ever Moroccan national team. The team has been active since at least 2004, and made its international debut in 2006, at the 2006 Africa Division Three tournament. Although Morocco falls into the ICC Africa development region, the national federation also has links with European countries – a development team from the Gibraltar Cricket Association toured in 2003, and England's Marylebone Cricket Club toured the following year.

In 2016, it was reported that there were twelve active clubs, spread across six cities (Bouznika, Casablanca, Khemisset, Rabat, Salé, and Tangier).

== Cricketing events in Morocco ==
In the early 2000s, an Emirati businessman, Abdul Rahman Bukhatir also financed the construction of a US$25-million international cricket venue in Tangier, known as the National Cricket Stadium. Bukhatir's aim was to promote cricket in the Arab world. In August 2002, Pakistan, South Africa, and Sri Lanka played a One Day International (ODI) series at the ground, which was known as the Morocco Cup. The team played at international level until 2012 under South African coach Riaz Richards.
