= 2009 ICC World Cricket League Africa Region Division Three =

- Administrator: African Cricket Association
- Cricket format: 50 overs per side
- Tournament format: round robin
- Host: Malawi
- Champions: Malawi
- Participants: 6(one withdrew before tournament)
- Matches: 15
- Most runs: (Malawi) Sheilandra Jeena 201
- Most wickets: (Malawi) Zafarullah Sukhera

The 2009 ICC World Cricket League Africa Region Division Three was a cricket tournament in Malawi, taking place between 3 and 7 October 2009. It gave six African Associate and Affiliate members of the International Cricket Council experience of international one-day cricket and formed part of the global World Cricket League structure.

The top two teams, Malawi and Sierra Leone was promoted to Division 2.

== Teams ==
There were 5 teams that played in the tournament, Morocco withdrew due to visa problems. These teams were non-test member nations of the African Cricket Association. The teams that played were:

- Gambia
- Lesotho
- Malawi
- Rwanda
- Sierra Leone
- Morocco (withdrew)

== Squads ==
Gambia	Lesotho	Malawi
Zaccheus Akila Moses Badjan; Moses Bahoum; Peter Campbell; Aniru Conteh; Bakary Darboe; Mbye Dumbuya; George Greywoode; Abdoulie Johnson; Prince Johnson; Gabriel Njie; Melville Williams	Bokang Khoai Lehlomela Khubetsoana; Leokaoke Lebona; Ralintsi Lemphane; Thapelo Lintsi; Thabang Mafereka; Atanase Mohapi; Bongane Mosiuoa; Malebanye Nkoko; Mosokotso Sello; Masiu Tolofi; Tsabanye; Nkhashe Tsooanyane	Frank Aleck Akbar Bhana; Karamutallah Chaudry; Naeem Chaudry; Ishtaq Khan; Danish Jakhura; Sheilandra Jeena; Faraz Junejo; Arjun Kamlesh; Imran Khan; Muzakkir Khan; Mushaid Qureshi; Zafarullah Sukhera; Tariq Mohamed

Rwanda	Sierra Leone
Derrick Bayingana Emmanuel Byiringiro; Eric Dusabemungu; Eric Dusingizimana; Shijith Kalada; Andre Kayitera; Praveen Menon; Dennis Mukama; Evode Mutuyimana; Subhasis Samal; Bob Songha; Joseph Tuyishimire; Srinath Vardhinen; Coach: William Kamanyi	Gabriel Anthony Julius Brewah; Olu Coker; Ibrahim Kabia; Mustapha Kallon; Abubakarr Kamara; Alie John Kamara; Emmanuel Kamara; Edward Kamara; Ibrahim Kamara; Lansana Lamin; Mohamed Mansaray; Edward Marah; Luseni Senesie; Bamie Williams

== Group stage ==
=== Points Table ===
Group Table
Team	P	W	L	T	NR	NRR	Points
Malawi	5	5	0	0	0	1.447	10
Sierra Leone	5	4	1	0	0	1.843	8
Rwanda	5	3	2	0	0	1.305	6
Gambia	5	2	3	0	0	−1.965	4
Lesotho	5	1	4	0	0	−2.998	2
Morocco	5	0	5	0	0	0	0

Team gets promoted to Division 2

=== Fixtures ===
3 October 2009
scorecard

Gambia; 92 (24 overs)	v	Rwanda; 96/3 (19.1 overs)
Extras (w 20) 20; Abdoulie Johnson 20 (31); Bob Songha 4/13 (4 overs)		Extras (3 b, 8 lb, 3 nb, 13 w) 27; Subhasis Samal 20 (22); Prince Johnson 2/25 (7 overs)

Rwanda won by 7 wickets
Indian Sports Club, Blantyre
Umpires: David Odhiambo and Rafiq Valimahomed
Player of the match: Bob Songha

- Points: Gambia 0, Rwanda 2
- Bowling in the Gambia innings adds 6 runs under
- Bowling in the Rwanda innings adds 3 runs over

3 October 2009
scorecard

Malawi; 165 (34.2 overs)	v	Lesotho; 98 (29.3 overs)
Naeem Chaudry 51 (?); Bongane Mosiuoa 4/17 (8.2 overs)		Malebanye Nkoko 27 (51); Mushaid Qureshi 3/23 (5 overs)

Malawi won by 67 runs
Mpingwe Sports Club
Umpires: Kutub Gulamabbas and Subhash Modi
Player of the match: Naeem Chaudry

- Points: Lesotho 0, Malawi 2
- Malawi innings batting adds 9 runs under
- Bowling in the Malawi innings adds 2 runs under
- Bowling in the Lesotho innings adds 10 runs over

3 October 2009
scorecard

Morocco	v	Sierra Leone

Sierra Leone won by a walkover

- Points: Morocco 0, Sierra Leone 2

4 October 2009
scorecard

Sierra Leone; 255/7 (50 overs)	v	Gambia; 74 (27.2 overs)
Abubakarr Kamara 81* (113); Zaccheus Akila 2/28 (5 overs)		Moses Badjan 29; Bamie Williams 3/1 (1.2 overs)

Sierra Leone won by 181 runs
Limbe Country Club, Blantyre
Umpires: Rockie D'Mello & Amin Tar Mohamed
Player of the match: Abubakarr Kamara

- Points: Gambia 0, Sierra Leone 2
- Bowling in the Sierra Leone innings adds 17 runs under

4 October 2009
scorecard

Lesotho	v	Morocco

Lesotho won by a walkover

- Points: Morocco 0, Lesotho 2

4 October 2009
scorecard

Malawi; 172 (44.3 overs)	v	Rwanda; 126 (41.1 overs)
Extras (7 lb, 3 nb, 23 w) 33; Naeem Chaudry 33 (43); Arjun Kalaria 33* (48); Shijith Kalada 3/13 (4 overs)		Andre Kayitera 43 (93); Zafarullah Sukhera 4/16 (9 overs)

Malawi won by 46 runs
Mpingwe Sports Club
Umpires: Kutub Gulamabbas and Subhash Modi
Player of the match: Zafarullah Sukhera

- Points: Rwanda 0, Malawi 2
- Malawi innings batting adds 1 run under
- Bowling in the Malawi innings adds 1 run under

5 October 2009
scorecard

Lesotho; 82 (32.2 overs)	v	Sierra Leone; 85/4 (14.2 overs)
Extras (1 b, 2 lb, 10 w) 13; Ralintsi Lemphane 13 (19); Lansana Lamin 3/12 (9.2 overs)		Abubakarr Kamara 19 (5); Lehlomela Khubetsoana 2/20 (3 overs)

Sierra Leone won by 6 wickets
Blantyre Sports Club, Blantyre
Umpires: Kutub Gulamabbas and Rafiq Valimahomed
Player of the match: Lansana Lamin

- Points: Lesotho 0, Sierra Leone 2

5 October 2009
scorecard

Malawi; 277/9 (50 overs)	v	Gambia; 136 (35 overs)
Sheilandra Jeena 153* (116); Prince Johnson 5/43 (10 overs)		Moses Bahoum 57 (76); Arjun Kalaria 4/25 (8 overs)

Malawi won by 141 runs
Limbe Country Club, Blantyre
Umpires: Rockie D'Mello & and David Odhiambo
Player of the match: Sheilandra Jeena

- Points: Gambia 0, Malawi 2

5 October 2009
scorecard

Morocco	v	Rwanda

Rwanda won by a walkover

- Points: Morocco 0, Rwanda 2

6 October 2009
scorecard

Morocco	v	Gambia

Gambia won by a walkover

- Points: Morocco 0, Gambia 2

6 October 2009
scorecard

Rwanda; 301/8 (50 overs)	v	Lesotho; 84 (23.3 overs)
Subhasis Samal 110; Lehlomela Khubetsoana 3/33 (7 overs)		Atanase Mohapi 33; Eric Dusabemungu 5/29 (9 overs)

Rwanda won by 217 runs
Blantyre Sports Club, Blantyre
Umpires: Amin Tar Mohamed & Rafiq Valimahomed
Player of the match: Subhasis Samal

- Points: Lesotho 0, Rwanda 2

6 October 2009
scorecard

Sierra Leone; 176 (41.5 overs)	v	Malawi; 177/6 (41.4 overs)
Lansana Lamin 78 (52); Zafarullah Sakhera 3/28 (9 overs)		Sheilandra Jeena 35* (41); Ibrahim Kabia 2/23 (9 overs)

Malawi won by 4 wickets
Limbe Country Club, Blantyre
Umpires: Rockie D'Mello & Subhash Modi
Player of the match: Lansana Lamin & Sheilandra Jeena

- Points: Sierra Leone 0, Malawi 2

7 October 2009
scorecard

Lesotho; 118 (31.3 overs)	v	Gambia; 119/8 (22.1 overs)
Extras (2 nb, 27 w) 29; Bongane Mosiuoa 25 (34); Mbye Dumbuya 3/22 (7.3 overs)		Extras (8 b, 30 w) 38; Moses Bahoum 25 (47); Masiu Tolofi 4/20 (6 overs)

Gambia won by 2 wickets
Limbe Country Club, Blantyre
Umpires: Kutub Gulamabbas & Rafiq Valimahomed

- Points: Lesotho 0, Gambia 2

7 October 2009
scorecard

Morocco	v	Malawi

Malawi won by a walkover

- Points: Morocco 0, Malawi 2

7 October 2009
scorecard

Rwanda; 134 (49.4 overs)	v	Sierra Leone; 138/9 38.3 overs)
Subhasis Samal 43 (85); Lansana Lamin 3/26 (10 overs)		Ibrahim Kamara 40 (65); Srinath Vardhinen 5/21 (9 overs)

Sierra Leone won by 1 wicket
Mpingwe Sports Club
Umpires: Rockie D'Mello & David Odhiambo
Player of the match: Ibrahim Kamara

- Points: Rwanda 0, Sierra Leone 2

== Statistics ==
Most Runs		Most Wickets	
(Malawi) Sheilandra Jeena	201	(Malawi) Zafarullah Sukhera	11
(Rwanda) Subhasis Samal	182	(Malawi) Arjun Kamlesh	10
(Sierra Leone) Lansana Lamin	146	(The Gambia) Prince Johnson	10
(Malawi) Naeem Chaudry	120	(Rwanda) Srinath Vardhinen	9
(Sierra Leone) Abubakarr Kamara	109	(Sierra Leone) Lansana Lamin	9
