= 2024 Men's T20 World Cup Africa Sub-regional Qualifier A =

Qualification tournament for the 2026 T20WC in Africa region

2024 ICC Men's T20 World Cup Africa Sub-regional Qualifier A
- Dates: 21 – 26 September 2024
- Administrator: ICC Africa
- Cricket format: Twenty20 International
- Tournament format: Round-robin
- Host: Tanzania
- Champions: Tanzania
- Runners-up: Malawi
- Participants: 6
- Matches: 15
- Player of the series: (Ghana) Obed Harvey
- Most runs: (Malawi) Sami Sohail (140)
- Most wickets: (Ghana) Obed Harvey (13) (Malawi) Suhail Vayani (13) (Lesotho) Waseem Yaqoob (13)

The 2024 ICC Men's T20 World Cup Africa Sub-regional Qualifier A was a cricket tournament that forms part of the qualification process for the 2026 Men's T20 World Cup. It was hosted by Tanzania in September 2024.

Tanzania and Malawi finished as the top two sides in the tournament and advanced to the regional final, where they will be joined by Namibia and Uganda, who were given a bye after having participated in the previous T20 World Cup, and four other teams from sub-regional qualifiers B and C.

== Squads ==
Cameroon	Ghana	Lesotho	Malawi	Mali	Tanzania
Faustin Mpegna (c); Julien Abega; Junior Alembe; Abdoulaye Aminou (wk); Sun Assegon; Roger Atangana; Alexis Balla; Veron Bomnyuy; Marvin Epok; Honestly Kinga; Dipita Loic; Idriss Tchakou (wk); Alain Toube (wk); Bruno Toube	Obed Harvey (c); Peter Ananya; Vincent Ateak; Samson Awiah; Frank Baaleri; Richmond Baaleri; Kofi Bagabena; Godfred Bakiweyem; Enoch Frimpong; Syed Aqeel Israr; Lee Nyarko; Alex Osei (wk); Aziz Sualley; Philip Yevugah	Maaz Khan (c); Chachole Tlali (vc, wk); Ts'episo Chaoana; Lerotholi Gabriel; Omar Hussain; Vijayakumar Jayant; Mohleki Leoela; Lebona Leokaoke; Molai Matsau; Bahlakoana Mejaro; Lefulere Monanthane; Sajid Patel; Thabiso Ramphoma; Waseem Yaqoob	Moazzam Baig (c); Bright Balala; Chisomo Chete (wk); Mike Choamba; Daniel Jakiel; Donnex Kansonkho; Gift Kansonkho; Aaftab Limdawala; Gershom Ntambalika; Blessings Pondani; Sami Sohail; Kelvin Thuchila; Suhail Vayani; Phillip Zuze (wk)	Yacouba Konate (c); Dramane Berthe; Lassina Berthe; Mohamed Coulibaly; Moustapha Diakite; Mohamed Fadiga; Amadou Fofana; Sanze Kamate; Cheick Keita; Theodore Macalou; Zakaria Makadji (wk); Mahamadou Malle; Amara Nimaga; Lamissa Sanogo	Abhik Patwa (c); Kassim Nassoro (vc); Halidy Amiri; Akhil Anil; Laksh Bakrania; Harsheed Chohan; Mohamed Issa; Khalidy Juma; Muhammad Zafar Khan; Ally Kimote; Omary Kitunda (wk); Jumanne Masquater; Johnson Nyambo; Amal Rajeevan (wk); SanjayKumar Thakor

== Points table ==
Qualifier A standings
Pos	Team	Pld	W	L	NR	Pts	NRR	Qualification
1	Tanzania (H)	5	5	0	0	10	4.774	Advanced to the regional final
2	Malawi	5	4	1	0	8	3.241	Advanced to the regional final
3	Ghana	5	3	2	0	6	1.575	Eliminated
4	Cameroon	5	2	3	0	4	−1.191	Eliminated
5	Lesotho	5	1	4	0	2	−2.283	Eliminated
6	Mali	5	0	5	0	0	−6.637	Eliminated

Source: ESPNcricinfo
(H) Host

== Fixtures ==
21 September 2024
09:30
Scorecard

Malawi; 145/4 (20 overs)	v	Lesotho; 52 (14.5 overs)
Sami Sohail 64 (46); Ts'episo Chaoana 1/15 (4 overs)		Mohleki Leoela 11 (14); Daniel Jakiel 4/12 (3.5 overs)

Malawi won by 93 runs
Gymkhana Club Ground, Dar es Salaam
Umpires: Adil Kassam (Tan) and Kerrin Klaaste (SA)
Player of the match: Sami Sohail (Malawi)

- Lesotho won the toss and elected to field.
- Sajid Patel (Les) made his T20I debut.

21 September 2024
13:50
Scorecard

Cameroon; 40 (14.2 overs)	v	Ghana; 41/2 (8.1 overs)
Dipita Loic 7 (9); Richmond Baaleri 4/6 (2 overs)		Obed Harvey 17* (16); Dipita Loic 1/8 (2 overs)

Ghana won by 8 wickets
Gymkhana Club Ground, Dar es Salaam
Umpires: Aasif Iqbal (UAE) and David Odhiambo (Ken)
Player of the match: Richmond Baaleri (Gha)

- Cameroon won the toss and elected to bat.
- Peter Ananya, Enoch Frimpong (Gha), Veron Bomnyuy and Honestly Kinga (Cmr) all made their T20I debuts.

21 September 2024
13:50
Scorecard

Mali; 18 (12.5 overs)	v	Tanzania; 19/0 (0.5 overs)
Sanze Kamate 3 (5); SanjayKumar Thakor 4/4 (3 overs)		Zafar Khan 12* (4)

Tanzania won by 10 wickets
University of Dar es Salaam Ground, Dar es Salaam
Umpires: Lubabalo Gcuma (SA) and Patric Makumbi (Uga)
Player of the match: SanjayKumar Thakor (Tan)

- Tanzania won the toss and elected to field.
- Laksh Bakrania, Khalidy Juma, Muhammad Zafar Khan (Tan), Yacouba Konate and Amara Nimaga (Mli) all made their T20I debuts.

22 September 2024
09:30
Scorecard

Mali; 57 (16.4 overs)	v	Cameroon; 58/4 (8.5 overs)
Lamissa Sanogo 15* (21); Idriss Tchakou 3/4 (2 overs)		Bruno Toube 20 (15); Cheick Keita 2/7 (1 over)

Cameroon won by 6 wickets
Gymkhana Club Ground, Dar es Salaam
Umpires: Adil Kassam (Tan) and Arsalaan Premji (Tan)
Player of the match: Idriss Tchakou (Cmr)

- Mali won the toss and elected to bat.
- Mohamed Fadiga (Mli) made his T20I debut.

22 September 2024
09:30
Scorecard

Malawi; 113/5 (20 overs)	v	Ghana; 88 (19 overs)
Gershom Ntambalika 34 (27); Obed Harvey 2/15 (4 overs)		Obed Harvey 19 (17); Moazzam Baig 3/8 (4 overs)

Malawi won by 25 runs
University of Dar es Salaam Ground, Dar es Salaam
Umpires: Lubabalo Gcuma (SA) and David Odhiambo (Ken)
Player of the match: Moazzam Baig (Mwi)

- Ghana won the toss and elected to field.

22 September 2024
13:50
Scorecard

Tanzania; 183/7 (20 overs)	v	Lesotho; 61 (14.5 overs)
Omary Kitunda 45 (41); Waseem Yaqoob 4/38 (4 overs)		Lerotholi Gabriel 33 (29); Laksh Bakrania 3/9 (3.5 overs)

Tanzania won by 122 runs
Gymkhana Club Ground, Dar es Salaam
Umpires: Habib Enesi (Nga) and Aasif Iqbal (UAE)
Player of the match: Omary Kitunda (Tan)

- Tanzania won the toss and elected to bat.
- Bahlakoana Mejaro (Les) made his T20I debut.

24 September 2024
09:30
Scorecard

Ghana; 133/3 (20 overs)	v	Lesotho; 83 (20 overs)
Richmond Baaleri 51* (55); Lebona Leokaoke 1/16 (4 overs)		Sajid Patel 42 (44); Enoch Frimpong 3/4 (3 overs)

Ghana won by 50 runs
University of Dar es Salaam Ground, Dar es Salaam
Umpires: Aasif Iqbal (UAE) and Arsalaan Premji (Tan)
Player of the match: Richmond Baaleri (Gha)

- Ghana won the toss and elected to bat.

24 September 2024
13:50
Scorecard

Cameroon; 37 (12.1 overs)	v	Tanzania; 38/1 (3 overs)
Abdoulaye Aminou 11 (11); Laksh Bakrania 4/6 (2.1 overs)		Omary Kitunda 13* (6); Bruno Toube 1/32 (2 overs)

Tanzania won by 9 wickets
Gymkhana Club Ground, Dar es Salaam
Umpires: Kerrin Klaaste (SA) and Patric Makumbi (Uga)
Player of the match: Laksh Bakrania (Tan)

- Cameroon won the toss and elected to bat.
- Sun Assegon (Cmr) made his T20I debut.

24 September 2024
13:50
Scorecard

Mali; 43 (17 overs)	v	Malawi; 44/1 (3.1 overs)
Yacouba Konate 11 (20); Suhail Vayani 4/8 (4 overs)		Donnex Kansonkho 24 (9); Theodore Macalou 1/12 (1.1 overs)

Malawi won by 9 wickets
University of Dar es Salaam Ground, Dar es Salaam
Umpires: Habib Enesi (Nga) and Adil Kassam (Tan)
Player of the match: Suhail Vayani (Mwi)

- Mali won the toss and elected to bat.
- Amadou Fofana (Mli) and Kelvin Thuchila (Mwi) both made their T20I debuts.

25 September 2024
09:30
Scorecard

Ghana; 84/9 (20 overs)	v	Tanzania; 88/3 (13.4 overs)
Obed Harvey 30 (44); Akhil Anil 2/11 (3 overs)		Muhammad Zafar Khan 24 (17); Obed Harvey 2/24 (4 overs)

Tanzania won by 7 wickets
University of Dar es Salaam Ground, Dar es Salaam
Umpires: Lubabalo Gcuma (SA) and Kerrin Klaaste (SA)
Player of the match: Akhil Anil (Tan)

- Ghana won the toss and elected to bat.

25 September 2024
13:50
Scorecard

Lesotho; 148 (19.5 overs)	v	Mali; 36 (9.4 overs)
Maaz Khan 61 (36); Sanze Kamate 3/12 (3 overs)		Theodore Macalou 14 (16); Waseem Yaqoob 6/18 (4 overs)

Lesotho won by 112 runs
Gymkhana Club Ground, Dar es Salaam
Umpires: Habib Enesi (Nga) and Adil Kassam (Tan)
Player of the match: Waseem Yaqoob (Les)

- Mali won the toss and elected to field.
- Dramane Berthe (Mli) made his T20I debut.
- Waseem Yaqoob became the first player for Lesotho to take a five-wicket haul in men's T20Is and to take a hat-trick.

25 September 2024
13:50
Scorecard

Cameroon; 30 (8.5 overs)	v	Malawi; 31/1 (2.5 overs)
Dipita Loic 8* (3); Moazzam Baig 5/4 (1.5 overs)		Sami Sohail 14* (8); Bruno Toube 1/3 (1 over)

Malawi won by 9 wickets
University of Dar es Salaam Ground, Dar es Salaam
Umpires: Patric Makumbi (Uga) and David Odhiambo (Ken)
Player of the match: Moazzam Baig (Mwi)

- Malawi won the toss and elected to field.

26 September 2024
09:30
Scorecard

Mali; 24 (10.3 overs)	v	Ghana; 27/0 (2.2 overs)
Mahamadou Malle 8 (27); Obed Harvey 4/5 (2 overs)		Samson Awiah 18* (9)

Ghana won by 10 wickets
Gymkhana Club Ground, Dar es Salaam
Umpires: Patric Makumbi (Uga) and Arsalaan Premji (Tan)
Player of the match: Lee Nyarko (Gha)

- Mali won the toss and elected to bat.
- Obed Harvey (Gha) took his first hat-trick in T20Is.

26 September 2024
09:30
Scorecard

Lesotho; 47 (10 overs)	v	Cameroon; 48/1 (8 overs)
Maaz Khan 10 (8); Dipita Loic 3/15 (4 overs)		Bruno Toube 44* (28); Waseem Yaqoob 1/10 (2 overs)

Cameroon won by 9 wickets
University of Dar es Salaam Ground, Dar es Salaam
Umpires: Aasif Iqbal (UAE) and Kerrin Klaaste (SA)
Player of the match: Bruno Toube (Cmr)

- Cameroon won the toss and elected to field.

26 September 2024
13:50
Scorecard

Tanzania; 119 (19.4 overs)	v	Malawi; 100 (20 overs)
Abhik Patwa 30 (27); Suhail Vayani 3/28 (4 overs)		Sami Sohail 38 (27); Khalidy Juma 3/17 (4 overs)

Tanzania won by 19 runs
Gymkhana Club Ground, Dar es Salaam
Umpires: Lubabalo Gcuma (SA) and David Odhiambo (Ken)
Player of the match: Khalidy Juma (Tan)

- Tanzania won the toss and elected to bat.
