= Indian Sports Club =

Cricket ground

Ground information
- Location: Blantyre, Malawi
- Country: Malawi
- Establishment: 1914

International information
- First men's T20I: 9 November 2019: Malawi v Mozambique
- Last men's T20I: 9 November 2019: Malawi v Mozambique
- As of 9 November 2019; Source: Cricinfo

The Indian Sports Club is a sports venue and Indian association in Blantyre, Malawi. The club was founded in 1914.

In November 2019, it was selected to host two matches of the 2019 Kwacha Cup, a Twenty20 International (T20I) cricket series between Malawi and Mozambique.

The ground has also hosted the 2015 domestic championship and a six-nations tournament in 2016. Local company United General Insurance donated K390,000 to upgrade the ground to host the international competition.

== See also ==
- Malawi national cricket team
