= List of Mozambique Twenty20 International cricketers =

This is a list of Mozambican Twenty20 International cricketers. In April 2018, the ICC decided to grant full Twenty20 International (T20I) status to all its members. Therefore, all Twenty20 matches played between Mozambique and other ICC members after 1 January 2019 will be eligible for T20I status.

This list comprises all members of the Mozambique cricket team who have played at least one T20I match. It is initially arranged in the order in which each player won his first Twenty20 cap. Where more than one player won his first Twenty20 cap in the same match, those players are listed alphabetically by surname. Mozambique played their first T20I matches during the 2019 T20 Kwacha Cup in November 2019.

== Key ==
General

- ‡ – Captain
- † – Wicket-keeper
- First – Year of debut
- Last – Year of latest game
- Mat – Number of matches played

Batting

- Runs – Runs scored in career
- HS – Highest score
- Avg – Runs scored per dismissal
- 50 – Number of half centuries
- 100 – Centuries scored
- * – Batsman remained not out

Bowling

- Balls – Balls bowled in career
- Wkt – Wickets taken in career
- BBI – Best bowling in an innings
- Ave – Average runs per wicket

Fielding

- Ca – Catches taken
- St – Stumpings affected

== List of players ==
Statistics are correct as of 25 October 2026.

Mozambique T20I cricketers
General					Batting					Bowling				Fielding		Ref
No.	Name	First	Last	Mat	Runs	HS	Avg	50	100	Balls	Wkt	BBI	Ave	Ca	St	Ref
1	Jose Bulele	2019	2026	39	800	62*	22.85	4	0	634	38	4/13	19.34	13	0	
2	Filipe Cossa‡	2019	2024	37	550	68	26.19	3	0	625	26	3/18	25.38	19	0	
3	Francisco Couana	2019	2024	38	1,005	104	31.40	5	1	673	36	5/19	19.94	14	0	
4	Santana Dima	2019	2022	15	23	9	3.28	0	0	151	9	3/41	23.66	1	0	
5	Gomes Gomes	2019	2026	19	138	52	11.50	1	0	12	0	–	–	1	0	
6	Joao Huo	2019	2026	54	1098	126	25.53	2	2	765	55	4/11	16.01	21	0	
7	Imran Ismail†	2019	2019	7	63	17	9.00	0	0	–	–	–	–	6	0	
8	Kaleem Shah‡	2019	2019	7	176	72*	29.33	1	0	102	3	2/24	43.33	1	0	
9	Zefanias Matsinhe	2019	2022	22	41	23	6.83	0	0	228	13	4/13	17.92	4	0	
10	Bernardo Sambo†	2019	2025	6	17	9*	–	0	0	–	–	–	–	4	0	
11	Vieira Tembo†	2019	2026	43	438	47*	14.60	0	0	185	15	3/21	8.27	5	1	
12	Bernardo Simango	2019	2022	4	0	0	0	0	0	18	1	1/21	21.00	1	0	
13	Last Emilio†	2019	2022	24	175	31*	12.57	0	0	–	–	–	–	13	9	
14	Louren'o Simango	2019	2026	26	106	258	11.77	0	0	351	22	2/11	18.00	5	0	
15	Shelton Nhavotso	2021	2021	4	12	5	4.00	0	0	32	1	1/33	40.00	2	0	
16	Gerito Sopinho	2021	2021	1	0	0	0.00	0	0	–	–	–	–	1	0	
17	Frederico Carava	2021	2022	12	29	12	5.80	0	0	–	–	–	–	0	0	
18	Agostinho Navicha	2021	2026	45	480	61*	20.86	1	0	216	13	2/15	25.84	13	0	
19	Jose Joao	2022	2026	30	125	22	8.33	0	0	36	1	1/24	65.00	6	0	
20	Lourenco Salomone	2022	2026	31	292	79	11.68	1	0	153	10	2/15	23.50	6	0	
21	Armando Chuvale	2022	2022	1	3	3*	–	0	0	–	–	–	–	0	0	
22	Dario Macome	2022	2024	18	7	6	2.33	0	0	228	14	3/18	18.35	8	0	
23	Camate Roposo	2022	2026	34	125	24*	10.41	0	0	527	35	3/14	16.77	9	0	
24	Luis Mavume	2022	2025	12	45	15	11.25	0	0	–	–	–	–	0	0	
25	Mario Manjate	2023	2025	11	21	12	3.50	0	0	6	0	–	–	5	0	
26	Farruque Nhaduate†	2023	2026	20	389	93	22.88	2	0	19	2	2/18	9.00	13	3	
27	Nelson Nhaduate	2023	2023	2	8	8	8.00	0	0	30	1	1/24	36.00	0	0	
28	Eugenio Azine	2024	2024	1	–	–	–	–	–	–	–	–	–	0	0	
29	Manussur Algi	2025	2026	11	32	13*	16.00	0	0	120	8	2/15	23.75	5	0	
30	Julio Chicuele	2025	2026	5	15	8*	15.00	0	0	–	–	–	–	3	0	
31	Charles Mbebe	2025	2026	13	12	10*	12.00	0	0	228	7	2/14	43.14	2	0	
32	Emerson Ndzeute	2025	2026	14	3	2*	–	0	0	204	10	3/21	31.10	2	0	
