= World Cricket League Africa Region =

- Administrator: African Cricket Association, International Cricket Council
- Format: One Day International; List A
- First edition: 2006
- Tournament format: League system
- Number of teams: 16 nations
- Current champion: Unknown
- Most successful: None

The World Cricket League Africa Region or Africa World Cricket League was a one-day cricket tournament organised by the African Cricket Association for non-Test national cricket teams in Africa. As well as providing opportunity for national teams to play international matches against others of a similar standard, it also provides qualification into the ICC World Cricket League.

The league contains three divisions played once every two years with promotion taking place between divisions. As yet, there has not been a Division One tournament played and so there are no current champions. Currently, there is no date set for this to take place.

== History ==
The Africa regional tournament of the World Cricket League was introduced in 2006. Two divisions were played with the teams being distributed according to the final placings of the 2004 ACA Championships. The upper division, designated as Division Two, contained the associate African nations at that time with the exception of Kenya, Namibia and Uganda who were already embedded in the World Cricket League. It is assumed that these three teams are expected to participate in Africa Division One alongside promoted teams from Division Two. Division Three was made up of eight affiliate African nations.

At present, there has been no relegation for teams finishing bottom in the divisions though this may change if the first division is played in the future.

== Tournaments ==
=== 2006 ===
==== Division Three ====
The 2006 Division Three tournament featured eight African affiliate members of the International Cricket Council. Pool 1 featured Gambia, Ghana, Lesotho and Malawi whilst Pool 2 featured Morocco, Mozambique, Rwanda and Sierra Leone. It was hosted at the Willowmoore Park cricket complex in Benoni, South Africa and was won by Mozambique, who qualified for Division Two later in the year.

Pos	Team	Promotion/Relegation
1st	Mozambique	Promoted to 2006 Africa Division Two
2nd	Sierra Leone	Remain in 2008 Africa Division Three
3rd	Ghana	Remain in 2008 Africa Division Three
4th	Malawi	Remain in 2008 Africa Division Three
5th	Morocco	Remain in 2008 Africa Division Three
6th	Rwanda	Remain in 2008 Africa Division Three
7th	Gambia	Remain in 2008 Africa Division Three
8th	Lesotho	Remain in 2008 Africa Division Three

==== Division Two ====
The 2006 Division Two tournament was played in Dar-es-Salaam in Tanzania. It was a round-robin tournament, featuring Botswana, Nigeria, Tanzania and Zambia who were joined by Mozambique from the Division Three tournament. Tanzania topped the points table, thus qualifying for Division Three of the World Cricket League. Botswana were runners-up and qualified for Division Five of the World Cricket League, with third placed Mozambique later being invited to join them.

Pos	Team	Promotion/Relegation
1st	Tanzania	Promoted to Africa Division One
2nd	Botswana	Remain in 2008 Africa Division Two
3rd	Mozambique	Remain in 2008 Africa Division Two
4th	Zambia	Remain in 2008 Africa Division Two
5th	Nigeria	Remain in 2008 Africa Division Two

=== 2008 ===
==== Division Three ====
In April 2008, the Division Three tournament was again held at the Willowmoore Park cricket complex in Benoni, South Africa. Due to the late withdrawal of Morocco, the tournament featured seven African affiliate members of the International Cricket Council and a South African Invitational team. Pool 1 featured Lesotho, Malawi, Rwanda and Sierra Leone. Whilst Pool 2 featured Gambia, Ghana, Swaziland and the South African Invitation XI. Although the SA Invitation XI won Pool 2 without losing a match, the tournament rules did not allow them to participate in the semi-finals and their place was taken by Swaziland (third in Pool 2). After Ghana easily accounted for Rwanda in the first semi-final, they beat Swaziland (who had defeated Sierra Leone in the other semi-final) in the final to win the tournament.

Pos	Team	Promotion/Relegation
1st	Ghana	Promoted to 2008 Africa Division Two
2nd	Swaziland	Promoted to 2008 Africa Division Two
3rd	Sierra Leone	Remain in 2009 Africa Division Three
4th	Rwanda	Remain in 2009 Africa Division Three
5th	Malawi	Remain in 2009 Africa Division Three
6th	Lesotho	Remain in 2009 Africa Division Three
7th	SA Invitation XI	Replaced Morocco
8th	Gambia	Remain in 2009 Africa Division Three

==== Division Two ====
In October 2008, the Division Two tournament was held at the Willowmoore Park cricket complex in Benoni, South Africa. The tournament was originally scheduled to be held in September 2008 in Lusaka, Zambia but was rescheduled to South Africa just before the original tournament started due to the death of the Zambian President. The tournament featured three African associate members of the ICC; Botswana, Nigeria and Zambia and three affiliate members; Ghana, Mozambique and Swaziland in a round robin format.

The three associate members proved stronger than their three affiliate competitors, with the final group table reflecting the associate / affiliate split. Botswana were the overall winners after going through the tournament undefeated with Nigeria emerging as the second best and both the teams have been rewarded with promotion to Africa Division One. Due to their performance in the tournament, Nigeria qualified for Division Seven of the World Cricket League.

Pos	Team	Promotion/Relegation
1st	Botswana	Promoted to Africa Division One
2nd	Nigeria	Promoted to Africa Division One
3rd	Zambia	Remain in 2010 Africa Division Two
4th	Mozambique	Remain in 2010 Africa Division Two
5th	Ghana	Remain in 2010 Africa Division Two
6th	Swaziland	Remain in 2010 Africa Division Two

=== 2009-10 ===
==== Division Three ====
The 2009 Africa Division Three was played from 1–7 October in Malawi. The hosts were joined by four other teams who remained from the previous playing the year before. Morocco were intending to take part as well, but had to pull out as their visas were not accepted. The winners were Malawi who were promoted to Africa Division Two alongside the runners-up Sierra Leone.

Pos	Team	Promotion/Relegation
1st	Malawi	Promoted to 2010 Africa Division Two
2nd	Sierra Leone	Promoted to 2010 Africa Division Two
3rd	Rwanda	Remain in Africa Division Three
4th	Gambia	Remain in Africa Division Three
5th	Lesotho	Remain in Africa Division Three

==== Division Two ====
Africa Division Two took place from 24–29 April 2010. The competition was held in Benoni, South Africa and included Ghana, Malawi, Mozambique, Sierra Leone, Swaziland and Zambia. The winners, Zambia gained entry into 2010 WCL Division Eight.

Pos	Team	Promotion/Relegation
1st	Zambia	Qualify for 2010 WCL Division Eight
2nd	Ghana	Remain in Africa Division Two
3rd	Swaziland	Remain in Africa Division Two
4th	Sierra Leone	Remain in Africa Division Two
5th	Mozambique	Remain in Africa Division Two
6th	Malawi	Remain in Africa Division Two

==== Division One ====
The Division One tournament which includes Botswana, Kenya, Namibia, Nigeria, Tanzania and Uganda was to be held in 2010. However, due to the busy schedule the tournament was shelved.

== Champions ==
=== Division Two ===
Year	Venue	Champion	Runner-Up
2006	(Tanzania); Dar-es-Salaam	Tanzania	Botswana
2008	(South Africa); Benoni	Botswana	Nigeria
2010	(South Africa); Benoni	Zambia	Ghana
2011	(South Africa); Benoni	Nigeria	Ghana
2012	(South Africa); Benoni	Botswana	Tanzania

=== Division Three ===
Year	Venue	Champion	Runner-Up
2006	(South Africa); Benoni	Mozambique	Sierra Leone
2008	(South Africa); Benoni	Ghana	Swaziland
2009	(Malawi); Blantyre	Malawi	Sierra Leone
2010	(South Africa); Benoni	Ghana	Swaziland
2011	(Ghana); Accra	Rwanda	Seychelles
2012	(South Africa); Johannesburg	Zambia	Seychelles

== See also ==
- African Cricket Association
- ICC Africa Under-19 Championships
