= 2006 ICC World Cricket League Africa Region Division Two =

- Administrator: African Cricket Association
- Cricket format: 50 overs per side
- Tournament format: round robin
- Host: Tanzania
- Champions: Tanzania
- Participants: 5
- Matches: 10
- Most runs: (Botswana) Noor Ahmad 194
- Most wickets: (Tanzania) Athumani Kakonzi 13

The 2006 ICC World Cricket League Africa Region Division Two was a cricket tournament in Tanzania, taking place between 23 April and 27 August 2006. It gave five African Associate and Affiliate members of the International Cricket Council experience of international one-day cricket and formed part of the global World Cricket League structure.

The top team, Tanzania, was promoted to Division 1. Tanzania played Mazambique, Nigeria, Zambia and Botswana.

== Teams ==
There were 5 teams that played in the tournament. These teams were non-test member nations of the African Cricket Association. The teams that played were:

Pool 1

- Botswana
- Mozambique
- Nigeria

Pool 2

- Tanzania
- Zambia

== Squads ==
Botswana	Mozambique	Nigeria	Tanzania	Zambia
Akhlaq Raja Aslam Chand; Danish Shirazi; Feroz Essack; G Mosa Gaolekwe; Karan Kapoor; Tshepo Mhozya; John Mokokwe; James WM Moses; Noor Ahmad; Omar Ali; Abdul Razak Mosa Patel; Denzil Kenan Sequeira	Aasif Koliya Jawaid Abbas; Amin Mohamad; Elisio Chitsonzo; Irfan Jamal; Kaleem Shah; Imtiyaz Shafikbhai Lili; Mohammad Shahzad; Muhammad Panjwani; Zainulabidin Gulam Patel; Chandra SC Puspussen; Qurban Ali; Shoaib Younis	Adekunle P Adegbola Yemi Adegbola; Makanjuola Akinyemi; Adelayo Atoloye; Olajide J Bejide; Thomas Ezeh; Oluwadolapo Gafar; Thomas Haruna; Roland Ilube; Seun Odeku; Endurance Ofem; Joshua O Ogunlola; Tayo Okusanya; Ademola A Onikoyi	Hamisi Abdallah Hasnain Muhsin Damji; Hussein Muhamed; Athumani Kakonzi; Hatim Kudrati; Benson Mwita; Kazim Nasser; Kassim Nassoro; Abhik Ramesh Patwa; Khalil Zulfiqar Rehmtullah; Shaheed Dhanani	Kafuma Banda Godfrey Kandela; Rueben Kosita; Saidi Malama; Shahid Mohamed; Madaliso Mvula; Isaac Mwaba; Imran Suleman Patel; Javid Patel; Shahid Patel; Sarfraz A Patel; Hussain Patel Mohammed; Sharif Tangy

== Group stage ==
=== Points Table ===
Pool 1
Team	P	W	L	T	NR	NRR	Points
Tanzania	4	4	0	0	0	+3.114	8
Botswana	4	3	1	0	0	-0.043	6
Mozambique	4	2	2	0	0	-0.145	4
Zambia	4	1	3	0	0	-1.127	2
Nigeria	4	0	4	0	0	-1.261	0

Team gets promoted to Division 1

=== Group stage ===
23 August 2006
Scorecard

Botswana; 192 (46.4 overs)	v	Nigeria; 165 (43.4 overs)
Noor Ahmad 102* (112); Roland Ilube 3/14 (2.4 overs)		Seun Odeku 37 (78); Aslam Chand 3/27 (6.4 overs)

Botswana won by 27 runs
University of Dar-es-Salaam Ground, Dar-es-Salaam
Umpires: Rockie D'Mello & Kutub Gulamabbas (both KEN)
Player of the match: Noor Ahmad

23 August 2006
Scorecard

Tanzania; 260/4 (50 overs)	v	Mozambique; 110 (34 overs)
Athumani Kakonzi 108* (119); Zainulabidin Patel 2/48 (10 overs)		Jawaid Abbas 30 (43); Kassim Nassoro 3/10 (5 overs)

Tanzania won by 150 runs
Annadil Burhani Ground, Dar-es-Salaam
Umpires: Narendra Dave & David Odhiambo (both KEN)
Player of the match: Athumani Kakonzi

24 August 2006
Scorecard

Botswana; 99 (34.2 overs)	v	Zambia; 65 (25 overs)
Tshepo Mhozya 27 (89); Godfrey Kandela 5/20 (6.2 overs)		Extras (1 lb, 3 nb, 12 w) 16; Imran Patel 13 (43); Karan Kapoor 5/2 (8 overs)

Botswana won by 34 runs
Annadil Burhani Ground, Dar-es-Salaam
Umpires: Narendra Dave & Rockie D'Mello (both KEN)
Player of the match: Karan Kapoor

24 August 2006
Scorecard

Tanzania; 182/9 (50 overs)	v	Nigeria; 71 (33.2 overs)
Abhik Patwa 34 (62); Tayo Okusanya 4/40 (10 overs)		Adekunle Adegbola 20 (41); Benson Mwita 4/23 (10 overs)

Tanzania won by 111 runs
University of Dar-es-Salaam Ground, Dar-es-Salaam
Umpires: Kutub Gulamabbas & David Odhiambo (both KEN)
Player of the match: Unknown

25 August 2006
Scorecard

Mozambique; 168 (48.5 overs)	v	Botswana; 169/2 (39.2 overs)
Extras (2 b, 7 lb, 11 nb, 26 w) 46; Irfan Jamal 35* (98); Akhlaq Raja 3/23 (10 overs); Abdul Patel 3/24 (10 overs)		Noor Ahmad 75* (165); James Moses 74* (167); Imtiyaz Lili 1/28 (10 overs); Aasif Koliya 1/23 (8.2 overs)

Botswana by 8 wickets
University of Dar-es-Salaam Ground, Dar-es-Salaam
Umpires: Narendra Dave & David Odhiambo (both KEN)
Player of the match: Abdul Patel

25 August 2006
Scorecard

Nigeria; 156 (49.4 overs)	v	Zambia; 158/7 (40 overs)
Adekunle Adegbola 55 (96); Saidi Malama 3/26 (10 overs)		Extras (4 b, 1 nb, 35 w) 40; Sarfraz Patel 35 (42); Thomas Haruna 2/23 (5 overs)

Zambia won by 3 wickets
Annadil Burhani Ground, Dar-es-Salaam
Umpires: Rockie D'Mello & Kutub Gulamabbas (both KEN)
Player of the match: Saidi Malama

26 August 2006
Scorecard

Mozambique; 156 (45.5 overs)	v	Nigeria; 80 (30.5 overs)
Qurban Ali 37 (47); Joshua Ogunlola3/34 (7.5 overs)		Adelayo Atoloye 21 (32); Aasif Koliya 4/25 (10 overs)

Mozambique won by 76 runs
Annadil Burhani Ground, Dar-es-Salaam
Umpires: Rockie D'Mello & David Odhiambo (both KEN)
Player of the match: Aasif Koliya

26 August 2006
Scorecard

Zambia; 58 (24.2 overs)	v	Tanzania; 59/1 (8.4 overs)
Sharif Tangy 16 (21); Benson Mwita 4/10 (6.2 overs)		Shaheed Dhanani 20* (21); Athumani Kakonzi 29* (30); Imran Patel 1/26 (4 overs)

Tanzania won by 9 wickets
University of Dar-es-Salaam Ground, Dar-es-Salaam
Umpires: Narendra Dave & Kutub Gulamabbas (both KEN)
Player of the match: Benson Mwita

27 August 2006
Scorecard

Mozambique; 193 (46.1 overs)	v	Zambia; 112 (27.1 overs)
Kaleem Shah 70 (114); Saidi Malama 4/30 (8.1 overs)		Extras (6 b, 1 lb, 16 w) 23; Sharif Tangy 21 (13); Aasif Koliya 5/35 (10 overs)

Mozambique won by 81 runs
University of Dar-es-Salaam Ground, Dar-es-Salaam
Umpires: Rockie D'Mello & Kutuub Gulamabbas (both KEN)
Player of the match: Aasif Koliya

27 August 2006
Scorecard

Botswana; 97 (31.4 overs)	v	Tanzania; 99/2 (16.3 overs)
James Moses 29 (66); Athumani Kakonzi 5/23 (9.4 overs)		Athumani Kakonzi 42* (56); Feroz Essack 2/33 (4.3 overs)

Tanzania won by 8 wickets
Annadil Burhani Ground, Dar-es-Salaam
Umpires: Narendra Dave & David Odhiambo (both KEN)
Player of the match: Athumani Kakonzi

== Statistics ==
Most Runs		Most Wickets	
(Botswana) Noor Ahmad	194	(Tanzania) Athumani Kakonzi	13
(Tanzania) Athumani Kakonzi	179	(Tanzania) Benson Mwita	12
(Tanzania) Abhik Patwa	116	(Zambia) Saidi Malama	10
(Mozambique) Kaleem Shah	112	(Mozambique) Aasif Koliya	10
(Botswana) Abdul Patel	89	(Nigeria) Joshua Ogunlola	8
