= 2006 ICC World Cricket League Africa Region Division Three =

- Administrator: African Cricket Association
- Cricket format: 50 overs per side
- Tournament format: round robin with playoffs
- Host: South Africa
- Champions: Mozambique
- Participants: 8
- Matches: 20
- Most runs: (Mozambique) Kaleem Shah 313
- Most wickets: (Ghana) Peter Ananya 14

The 2006 ICC World Cricket League Africa Region Division Three was a cricket tournament in South Africa, taking place between 23 April and 28 April 2006. It gave eight African Associate and Affiliate members of the International Cricket Council experience of international one-day cricket and formed part of the global World Cricket League structure.

The top team, Mozambique was promoted to Division 2.

== Teams ==
There were 8 teams that played in the tournament. These teams were non-test member nations of the African Cricket Association. The teams that played were:

Pool 1

- Ghana
- Gambia
- Lesotho
- Malawi

Pool 2

- Morocco
- Mozambique
- Rwanda
- Sierra Leone

== Squads ==
Gambia	Ghana	Lesotho	Malawi
Zaccheus Akila Moses Bahoum; Peter Campbell; Aniru Conteh; Alfred Crookes; Bakary Darboe; Mbye Dumbuya; Malamin Fofana; Johnny Gomez; George Greywoode; Prince Johnson; Aniel Mendy; Wilfred Riley; Musa Sillah	Obed H Agbomadzie; Lawrence Ahadzi; Kodom Anafie; Moses Anafie; Peter Ananya; Samson Awiah; Michael K Ayirewuje; Francis Bakiweyem; Thomas Bakiweyem; Mark Bawa; Matthew Bawa; Rufus Ntiamoah; Abdul-Karim Sumaila; James Vifah	S Abdulla Thabiso Lemphane; Tunisang Leoisa; Ts'epo Lephema; Rannakoe Mahao; Malebanye Nkoko; Motsielo Nonyane; Lesole Nts'ekhe; Relebohile Qhashele; Tanki Senekane; Moshabesha Setsoamali; Daniel Skinner; Phoka Thene	Allidi Allie Imran Banda; Shoaib Chinoy; Faraz Junejo; Yaseen Junejo; I Kara; Imran Khan; Aubrey Msosa; Henry Njoka; Musaeed Qureshi; Zafar Sukhera; T Tarmohamed; Irfan Vadia; Seraz Zaveri

Morocco	Mozambique	Rwanda	Sierra Leone
Abdullatief Bencheckron Mehdi Benetayab; Tarek El Ghani; Salah El Mouridi; Abdelghani Ennaoui; Mohammed Ennaoui; Soufiane Essayeh; Azhar Hanchaoui; Rachid Harmaoui; I Keltani; Kishour Kirpalani; Kamal Moudden; Amine Moussaoui; Zakaria Zaki	Jawaid Abbas Kaleem Shah; Nadir Karim; Imtiyaz Lili; Mohammad Shahzad; Julio Nhamalizi; Muhammad Panjwani; Zainul Patel; Chandra Puspussen; Qurban Ali; Shoaib Younis; Mohammad Sidat; Bineesh Vadavathy	Iftekhar Ahmed Hussain Budhwani; Emmanuel Byiringiro; Eric Dusabemungu; Kiran Kapadiya; Andre Kayitera; Gopi Krishnan; Vinith Kumar; Julius Mbaraga; Mehboob Jasat; Mohamed Jesat; Dennis Mukama; Kalpin Patel; Srinath Vardhineni	Gabriel Anthony Alusine Dumbuya; Mohamed Dumbuya; Mustapha Kallon; Abubakarr Kamara; Alie Kamara; Emmanuel Kamara; Mohamed Kamara; Sheka Kamara; George Kpundeh; Momoe Kpundeh; Lansana Lamin; Mohamed Mansaray; Ibrahim Sesay

== Group stage ==
=== Points Table ===
Pool 1
Team	P	W	L	T	NR	NRR	Points
Malawi	3	3	0	0	0	+3.561	6
Ghana	3	2	1	0	0	+3.057	4
Gambia	3	1	2	0	0	-2.091	2
Lesotho	3	0	3	0	0	-4.778	0

Pool 2
Team	P	W	L	T	NR	NRR	Points
Mozambique	3	3	0	0	0	+1.450	6
Sierra Leone	3	2	1	0	0	+0.692	4
Morocco	3	1	2	0	0	-0.283	2
Rwanda	3	0	3	0	0	-1.908	0

Team qualifies for Semifinals
Team qualifies for 5th place playoff Semifinals

=== Group stage ===
23 April 2006
Scorecard

Lesotho; 181/9 (50 overs)	v	Gambia; 182/5 (32.1 overs)
Extras (1 b, 2 lb, 7 nb, 40 w) 50; S Abdulla 37 (67); Zaccheus Akila 3/17 (10 overs)		Malamin Fofana 48* (49); Lesole Nts'ekhe 3/43 (8 overs)

Gambia won by 5 wickets
Willowmoore Park C Field, Benoni
Umpires: Tshepo Molefe & G Ramakrishna

23 April 2006
Scorecard

Ghana; 244/9 (50 overs)	v	Malawi; 245/6 (47.3 overs)
Kodom Anafie 51* (110); Zafar Sukhera 3/55 (10 overs)		Aubrey Msosa 55 (80); Abdul-Karim Sumaila 2/26 (10 overs)

Malawi won by 4 wickets
Willowmoore Park Main Oval, Benoni
Umpires: Juan Bedford & Jeff Luck

23 April 2006
Scorecard

Rwanda; 105 (34.1 overs)	v	Morocco; 110/7 (34.3 overs)
Extras (2 lb, 32 w) 34; Srinath Vardhineni 25 (28); Tarek El Ghani 4/26 (10 overs)		Extras (3 lb, 2 nb, 20 w) 25; Kamal Moudden 20 (76); Andre Kayitera 2/3 (1 over)

Morocco won by 3 wickets
Willowmoore Park M Field, Benoni
Umpires: T Motlhaping & Godfrey Nkosi

23 April 2006
Scorecard

Sierra Leone; 197 (49.4 overs)	v	Mozambique; 198/4 (45 overs)
Lansana Lamin 46 (50); Zainul Patel 4/34 (10 overs)		Kaleem Shah 55* (78); Gabriel Anthony 1/47 (9 overs)

Mozambique won by 6 wickets
Willowmoore Park A Field, Benoni
Umpires: Godfrey Hlengani & S Taylor

24 April 2006
Scorecard

Malawi; 355/7 (50 overs)	v	Gambia; 122 (24.1 overs)
Musaeed Qureshi 84 (53); Prince Johnson 2/60 (9 overs)		Extras 37; Alfred Crookes 26 (39); I Kara 3/8 (4 overs)

Malawi won by 233 runs
Willowmoore Park Main Oval, Benoni
Umpires: Godfrey Nkosi & S Taylor

24 April 2006
Scorecard

Ghana; 375/7 (50 overs)	v	Lesotho; 66 (30 overs)
Francis Bakiweyem 95 (104); Mark Bawa 93* (63); Lesole Nts'ekhe 2/28 (6 overs)		Extras (1 b, 1 lb, 31 w) 33; S Abdulla 10 (41); Obed H Agbomadzie 3/6 (6 overs)

Ghana won by 309 runs
Willowmoore Park A Field, Benoni
Umpires: Juan Bedford & T Motlhaping

24 April 2006
Scorecard

Mozambique; 275/6 (50 overs)	v	Morocco; 196 (46.3 overs)
Kaleem Shah 126 (109); Abdelghani Ennaoui 2/37 (6 overs)		Soufiane Essayeh 48 (71); Kaleem Shah 2/36 (8 overs)

Mozambique won by 79 runs
Willowmoore Park C Field, Benoni
Umpires: Godfrey Hlengani & G Ramakrishna
Player of the match: Kaleem Shah

24 April 2006
Scorecard

Sierra Leone; 231/7 (50 overs)	v	Rwanda; 132 (43.5 overs)
Lansana Lamin 91 (82); Gopi Krishnan 3/43 (5 overs)		Extras (5 b, 2 lb, 31 w) 38; Kalpin Patel 32 (53); Abubakarr Kamara 4/24 (10 overs); Gabriel Anthony 4/37 (10 overs)

Sierra Leone won by 99 runs
Willowmoore Park M Field, Benoni
Umpires: Jeff Luck & Tshepo Molefe
Player of the match: Lansana Lamin

- Bowling in the Sierra Leone innings adds 4 runs over.
- Bowling in the Rwanda innings adds 2 runs over.

25 April 2006
Scorecard

Gambia; 135 (40.5 overs)	v	Ghana; 137/1 (24.2 overs)
George Greywoode 50 (83); Moses Anafie 3/20 (7.5 overs)		Francis Bakiweyem 52 (53); Obed H Agbomadzie 49* (76); Zaccheus Akila 1/18 (4 overs)

Ghana won by 9 wickets
Willowmoore Park M Field, Benoni
Umpires: Tshepo Molefe & S Taylor
Player of the match: Francis Bakiweyem

25 April 2006
Scorecard

Malawi; 352/8 (50 overs)	v	Lesotho; 68 (22.1 overs)
I Kara 78 (79); Relebohile Qhashele 3/55 (7 overs)		Extras (4 lb, 22 w) 26; Moshabesha Setsoamali 18 (31); Faraz Junejo 4/25 (8.1 overs)

Malawi won by 284 runs
Willowmoore Park A Field, Benoni
Umpires: Jeff Luck & Godfrey Nkosi
Player of the match: Musaeed Qureshi

- Bowling in the Malawi innings adds 2 runs over.

25 April 2006
Scorecard

Sierra Leone; 191/6 (50 overs)	v	Morocco; 168 (42.4 overs)
George Kpundeh 633 (90); Mohammed Ennaoui 2/34 (10 overs)		Soufiane Essayeh 60 (77); Abubakarr Kamara 4/27 (7.4 overs)

Sierra Leone won by 23 runs
Willowmoore Park C Field, Benoni
Umpires: Juan Bedford & Godfrey Hlengani
Player of the match: George Kpundeh

25 April 2006
Scorecard

Mozambique; 268 (49.4 overs)	v	Rwanda; 156 (38.2 overs)
Mohammad Sidat 80 (102); Srinath Vardhineni 4/36 (10 overs)		Kiran Kapadiya 39 (69); Kaleem Shah 4/45 (10 overs)

Mozambique won by 112 runs
Willowmoore Park Main Oval, Benoni
Umpires: T Motlhaping & G Ramakrishna
Player of the match: Mohammad Sidat

=== 5th Place Playoff ===
27 April 2006
Scorecard

Rwanda; 171 (37.2 overs)	v	Gambia; 95 (34.3 overs)
Srinath Vardhineni 64 (63); Zaccheus Akila 3/24 (10 overs)		Mbye Dumbuya 22 (54); Mehboob Jasat 3/18 (10 overs)

Rwanda won by 76 runs
Willowmoore Park M Field, Benoni
Umpires: Juan Bedford & Godfrey Nkosi
Player of the match: Srinath Vardhineni

- 5th place playoff semifinal

27 April 2006
Scorecard

Lesotho; 359/7 (50 overs)	v	Morocco; 143 (37.2 overs)
Kamal Moudden 92 (105); Motsielo Nonyane 2/45 (10 overs)		S Abdulla 41 (64); Abdullatief Bencheckron 3/36 (7.2 overs); Zakaria Zaki 3/36 (8 overs)

Morocco won by 216 runs
Willowmoore Park Main Oval, Benoni
Umpires: T Motlhaping & Unknown

- 5th place playoff semifinal

28 April 2006
Scorecard

Morocco; 236 (48.4 overs)	v	Rwanda; 122 (23.1 overs)
Tarek El Ghani 53 (65); Srinath Vardhineni 3/48 (10 overs)		Srinath Vardhineni 69 (41); Amine Moussaoui 6/29 (6.1 overs)

Morocco won by 114 runs
Willowmoore Park A Field, Benoni
Umpires: Tariq Mukhtar & Unknown
Player of the match: Srinath Vardhineni

- 5th place playoff

28 April 2006
Scorecard

Lesotho; 90 (30.1 overs)	v	Gambia; 91/1 (15 overs)
Extras (2 b, 3 nb, 37 w) 42; Lesole Nts'ekhe 14 (50); Moses Bahoum 4/23 (10 overs)		Moses Bahoum 31* (54); S Abdulla 1/22 (6 overs)

Gambia won by 9 wickets
Willowmoore Park M Field, Benoni
Umpires: T Motlhaping & Godfrey Nkosi
Player of the match: Zaccheus Akila

- 7th place playoff

=== Semifinals and Finals ===
27 April 2006
Scorecard

Ghana; 151 (35.2 overs)	v	Mozambique; 152/6 (42.1 overs)
Mark Bawa 40 (31); Zainul Patel 4/22 (5.2 overs)		Mohammad Shahzad 50* (100); Peter Ananya 4/45 (10 overs)

Mozambique won by 4 wickets
Willowmoore Park C Field, Benoni
Umpires: Jeff Luck & Unknown
Player of the match: Zainul Patel

- Semifinal

27 April 2006
Scorecard

Sierra Leone; 189 (45.5 overs)	v	Malawi; 129 (38.5 overs)
Emmanuel Kamara 53 (106); Zafar Sukhera 4/29 (8.5 overs)		Zafar Sukhera 46 (45); Abubakarr Kamara 4/24 (8 overs)

Sierra Leone won by 60 runs
Willowmoore Park A Field, Benoni
Umpires: Godfrey Hlengani & Tshepo Molefe
Player of the match: Abubakarr Kamara

- Semifinal

28 April 2006
Scorecard

Ghana; 265/9 (50 overs)	v	Malawi; 41 (18.4 overs)
Rufus Ntiamoah 76 (66); I Kara 3/56 (10 overs)		Extras (14 w) 14; Musaeed Qureshi 8 (13); I Kara 7 (21); Peter Ananya 7/25 (9.4 overs)

Ghana won by 224 runs
Willowmoore Park C Field, Benoni
Umpires: Juan Bedford & Godfrey Hlengani
Player of the match: Peter Ananya

- 3rd Place Playoff

28 April 2006
Scorecard

Mozambique; 252/9 (50 overs)	v	Sierra Leone; 163 (39.5 overs)
Kaleem Shah 77 (99); Gabriel Anthony 3/47 (10 overs)		Emmanuel Kamara 63 (87); Nadir Karim 4/29 (5.5 overs)

Mozambique won by 89 runs
Willowmoore Park Main Oval, Benoni
Umpires: Juan Bedford & Jeff Luck

- Final

== Statistics ==
Most Runs		Most Wickets	
(Mozambique) Kaleem Shah	313	(Ghana) Peter Ananya	14
(Sierra Leone) George Kpundeh	169	(Sierra Leone) Abubakarr Kamara	12
(Sierra Leone) Lansana Lamin	149	(The Gambia) Zaccheus Akila	12
(Ghana) Kodom Anafie	165	(Rwanda) Srinath Vardhineni	12
(Malawi) Musaeed Qureshi	164	(Malawi) I Kara	11
