= Francisco Couana =

Mozambican cricketer (born 1996)

Personal information
- Full name: Francisco Damiao Couana
- Born: 10 November 1996 (age 30)

International information
- National side: Mozambique
- T20I debut (cap 3): 6 November 2019 v Malawi
- Last T20I: 24 October 2024 v Gambia

Career statistics
Competition	T20I
Matches	38
Runs scored	1,005
Batting average	31.40
100s/50s	1/5
Top score	104
Balls bowled	673
Wickets	36
Bowling average	19.94
5 wickets in innings	1
10 wickets in match	0
Best bowling	5/19
Catches/stumpings	14/–
- Source: Cricinfo, 9 December 2024

Francisco Couana (born 10 November 1996) is a Mozambican cricketer who plays for the Mozambique national cricket team. He was named in Mozambique's Twenty20 International (T20I) squad for the 2019 T20 Kwacha Cup. These were the first T20I matches to be played by Mozambique since the International Cricket Council (ICC) granted T20I status to all matches played between Associate Members after 1 January 2019. Couana made his T20I debut on 6 November 2019, in the first match of the tournament against hosts Malawi.

Couana was part of Mozambique's T20I squad for their matches in Group B of the 2021 ICC Men's T20 World Cup Africa Qualifier tournament in Rwanda. In Mozambique's second match of the qualifier, against Cameroon, he scored 104 runs and took five wickets. He became the first player for Mozambique to score a century in T20Is, and to take a five-wicket haul in T20Is. He also became the first player to score a century and take five wickets in a single T20I match.
