= Royal Moroccan Cricket Federation =

Cricket organization in Morocco

The Royal Moroccan Cricket Federation (French: Federation Royale Marocaine de Cricket; FRMC) is the official governing body of the sport of cricket in Morocco. It responsible for the selection of the Moroccan national team and the operation of Moroccan leagues. Its current headquarters is in Rabat, Morocco. The federation is Morocco's representative at the International Cricket Council of which it has been an affiliate member since 1999. It is also a member of the African Cricket Association, and falls into the ICC Africa development region.

In July 2019, the International Cricket Council (ICC) expelled the Royal Moroccan Cricket Federation, after continuing to be non-compliant with various membership requirements of the ICC.

== See also ==
- Cricket in Morocco
