= Lilongwe Golf Club =

Cricket ground

- Interactive map of Lilongwe Golf Club

Ground information
- Location: Lilongwe, Malawi
- Country: Malawi
- Coordinates: 13°59′31.20″S 33°45′57.60″E

International information
- First men's T20I: 6 November 2019: Malawi v Mozambique
- Last men's T20I: 7 November 2019: Malawi v Mozambique
- As of 7 November 2019; Source: Cricinfo

The Lilongwe Golf Club is a multi-sports venue in Lilongwe, Malawi. In November 2019, it was selected to host the first four matches of the 2019 Kwacha Cup, a Twenty20 International (T20I) cricket series between Malawi and Mozambique.

== See also ==
- Malawi national cricket team
