= 2019 T20 Kwacha Cup =

International cricket tournament

The 2019 T20 Kwacha Cup was a men's Twenty20 International/women's Twenty20 International (T20I) cricket event between the men's and women's national cricket teams of Malawi and Mozambique. Both the men's and women's series consisted of seven T20I matches played between 6 and 10 November 2019 in Blantyre and Lilongwe, Malawi. The venue for the first four men's T20I matches was the Lilongwe Golf Club in Lilongwe, and these were followed by two matches at Indian Sports Club and one match at Saint Andrews International High School in Blantyre. All of the women's T20I matches were played at Saint Andrews International High School. Malawi won the men's series 5–1, and the women's series 4–3.

== Men's series ==
2019 T20 Kwacha Cup (men)
| | Malawi | Mozambique |
- Dates: 6 – 10 November 2019
| Captains | Mohamed Abdulla (Note: Gift Kansonkho captained Malawi for the 6th and 7th T20Is.) | Kaleem Shah |

Twenty20 International series
- Results: Malawi won the 7-match series 5–1
| Most runs | Hamza Patel (137) | Francisco Couana (233) |
| Most wickets | Sami Sohail (14) | Zefanias Matsinhe (7) |

Both Malawi and Mozambique played their first matches with official T20I status, since the International Cricket Council's decision to grant T20I status to all matches played between men's national teams of Associate Members after 1 January 2019. These were the first men's T20I matches to be played in Malawi. Four matches were played at Lilongwe Golf Club in Lilongwe, two at Indian Sports Club in Blantyre and one at Saint Andrews International High School in Blantyre.

=== Squads ===
| Malawi | Mozambique |
|---|---|
| Mohamed Abdulla (c); Moazzam Baig; Irfan Bhima; Chisomo Chete; Alick Kansonkho; Donnex Kansonkho; Gift Kansonkho; Muhammad Khurram; Usama Master; Michael Mwamadi; Francis Nkhoma; Gershom Ntambalika; Mohammed Nurji; Adil Patel; Hamza Patel; Mahammed Patel; Sami Sohail | Kaleem Shah (c); Jose Bulele; Frederico Carava; Filipe Cossa; Francisco Couana; Santana Dima; Last Emilio; Gomes Gomes; Joao Hou; Imran Ismail; Helder Machanguana; Zefanias Matsinhe; Bernardo Sambo; Bernardo Simango; Lourenço Simango; Lourenco Solomone; Vieira Tembo |

=== T20I series ===
==== 1st T20I ====
6 November 2019
10:00
Scorecard

| Mozambique; 169/5 (20 overs) | v | Malawi; 170/7 (19.4 overs) |
| Francisco Couana 71* (36); Mahammed Patel 3/25 (4 overs) | | Mahammed Patel 40* (33); Zefanias Matsinhe 3/27 (4 overs) |

Malawi won by 3 wickets
Lilongwe Golf Club, Lilongwe
Umpires: Acacio Chitsondzo (Moz) and Osman Mhango (Mwi)

- Malawi won the toss and elected to field.
- Mohamed Abdulla, Moazzam Baig, Donnex Kansonkho, Gift Kansonkho, Muhammad Khurram, Usama Master, Michael Mwamadi, Adil Patel, Hamza Patel, Mahammed Patel, Sami Sohail (Mwi), Jose Bulele, Filipe Cossa, Francisco Couana, Santana Dima, Gomes Gomes, Joao Hou, Imran Ismail, Zefanias Matsinhe, Bernardo Sambo, Kaleem Shah and Vieira Tembo (Moz) all made their T20I debuts.
- Malawi and Mozambique both played their first men's T20I match.

==== 2nd T20I ====
6 November 2019
14:00
Scorecard

| Mozambique; 109 (19 overs) | v | Malawi; 114/3 (12.2 overs) |
| Kaleem Shah 30 (33); Moazzam Baig 4/20 (3 overs) | | Irfan Bhima 52 (35); Jose Bulele 2/30 (3.2 overs) |

Malawi won by 7 wickets
Lilongwe Golf Club, Lilongwe
Umpires: Acacio Chitsondzo (Moz) and Osman Mhango (Mwi)

- Mozambique won the toss and elected to bat.
- Irfan Bhima, Francis Nkhoma and Mohammed Nurji (Mwi) all made their T20I debuts.

==== 3rd T20I ====
7 November 2019
10:00
Scorecard

| Malawi; 142/6 (20 overs) | v | Mozambique; 117 (19 overs) |
| Hamza Patel 42 (33); Kaleem Shah 2/24 (4 overs) | | Francisco Couana 31 (33); Sami Sohail 3/19 (4 overs) |

Malawi won by 25 runs
Lilongwe Golf Club, Lilongwe
Umpires: Acacio Chitsondzo (Moz) and Osman Mhango (Mwi)

- Mozambique won the toss and elected to field.
- Chisomo Chete (Mwi), Last Emilio, Bernardo Simango and Lourenço Simango (Moz) all made their T20I debuts.

==== 4th T20I ====
7 November 2019
14:00
Scorecard

| Mozambique; 144/4 (20 overs) | v | Malawi; 145/6 (18.5 overs) |
| Kaleem Shah 72* (69); Sami Sohail 2/22 (3 overs) | | Mohammed Nurji 33* (17); Lourenço Simango 2/20 (3 overs) |

Malawi won by 4 wickets
Lilongwe Golf Club, Lilongwe
Umpires: Acacio Chitsondzo (Moz) and Osman Mhango (Mwi)

- Malawi won the toss and elected to field.

==== 5th T20I ====
9 November 2019
10:00
Scorecard

| Malawi; 142/3 (20 overs) | v | Mozambique; 127 (18.1 overs) |
| Irfan Bhima 46 (51); Francisco Couana 1/19 (4 overs) | | Last Emilio 23 (16); Sami Sohail 4/18 (4 overs) |

Malawi won by 15 runs
Indian Sports Club, Blantyre
Umpires: Acacio Chitsondzo (Moz) and Osman Mhango (Mwi)

- Mozambique won the toss and elected to field.
- Gershom Ntambalika (Mwi) made his T20I debut.

==== 6th T20I ====
9 November 2019
14:00
Scorecard

| Mozambique; 143/7 (20 overs) | v | Malawi |
| Kaleem Shah 27 (24); Hamza Patel 2/13 (2 overs) |

No result
Indian Sports Club, Blantyre
Umpires: Acacio Chitsondzo (Moz) and Osman Mhango (Mwi)

- Mozambique won the toss and elected to bat.
- No further play was possible due to rain.

==== 7th T20I ====
10 November 2019
14:00
Scorecard

| Mozambique; 104 (19.3 overs) | v | Malawi; 75/8 (15.1 overs) |
| Francisco Couana 43 (34); Irfan Bhima 3/14 (4 overs) | | Sami Sohail 32* (30); Francisco Couana 3/10 (3 overs) |

Mozambique won by 11 runs (DLS method)
Saint Andrews International High School, Blantyre
Umpires: Acacio Chitsondzo (Moz) and Osman Mhango (Mwi)

- Malawi won the toss and elected to field.
- No further play was possible due to rain.

== Women's series ==
2019 T20 Kwacha Cup (women)
| | Malawi | Mozambique |
- Dates: 6 – 10 November 2019
| Captains | Shahida Hussein | Olga Matsolo |

Twenty20 International series
- Results: Malawi won the 7-match series 4–3
| Most runs | Shahida Hussein (94) | Palmira Cuinica (145) |
| Most wickets | Triphonia Luka (14) | Christina Magaia (13) |

The women's series was played at Saint Andrews International High School in Blantyre. Malawi played their first T20I matches since August 2018, and Mozambique last played in the 2019 ICC Women's Qualifier Africa in May 2019. These were the first women's T20I matches to be played in Malawi.

=== Squads ===
| Malawi | Mozambique |
|---|---|
| Shahida Hussein (c); Sichela Benbow; Yolanda Biliyati; Promise Chiwaya; Meria Dailesi; Dalida Dzimau; Shalon Dzimau; Nellie Gamaliyele; Chimwemwe Juma; Thandi Katunga; Triphonia Luka; Lekeleni Mbendera; Tadala Mpandakwaya; Brenda Ndipo; Monica Ndipo; Vanessa Phiri; Dyna Rice | Olga Matsolo (c); Ameliana Arroz; Laura Chipanga; Isabel Chuma; Alcinda Cossa; Palmira Cuinica; Sheila Guambe; Rosalia Haiong; Flora Macaringue; Christina Magaia; Alda Mangue; Paula Mazuze; Atalia Monjane; Cecelia Murrombe; Helena Rungo; Jessica Sainda; Dalmira Tivane |

=== T20I series ===
==== 1st T20I ====
6 November 2019
09:00
Scorecard

| Mozambique; 75 (15 overs) | v | Malawi; 76/6 (12.4 overs) |
| Palmira Cuinica 27 (42); Triphonia Luka 3/7 (3 overs) | | Tadala Mpandakwaya 34 (33); Alcinda Cossa 2/18 (2 overs) |

Malawi won by 4 wickets
Saint Andrews International High School, Blantyre
Umpires: Jamie Aly (Mwi) and Lloyd Selemani (Mwi)

- Malawi won the toss and elected to field.
- Chimwemwe Juma (Mwi), Paula Mazuze, Atalia Monjane and Dalmira Tivane (Moz) all made their T20I debuts.

==== 2nd T20I ====
6 November 2019
13:00
Scorecard

| Mozambique; 113/8 (20 overs) | v | Malawi; 66/9 (20 overs) |
| Isabel Chuma 44 (44); Shahida Hussein 3/15 (4 overs) | | Shahida Hussein 12 (32); Olga Matsolo 4/14 (4 overs) |

Mozambique won by 47 runs
Saint Andrews International High School, Blantyre
Umpires: Jamie Aly (Mwi) and Lloyd Selemani (Mwi)

- Malawi won the toss and elected to field.
- Promise Chiwaya and Dyna Rica (Mwi) both made their T20I debuts.

==== 3rd T20I ====
7 November 2019
09:00
Scorecard

| Mozambique; 94 (17.4 overs) | v | Malawi; 95/7 (19.4 overs) |
| Palmira Cuinica 34 (30); Triphonia Luka 5/16 (4 overs) | | Shahida Hussein 34* (34); Christina Magaia 2/14 (4 overs) |

Malawi won by 3 wickets
Saint Andrews International High School, Blantyre
Umpires: Jamie Aly (Mwi) and Lloyd Selemani (Mwi)

- Mozambique won the toss and elected to bat.
- Lekeleni Mbendera (Mwi) made her T20I debut.
- Triphonia Luka became the first bowler for Malawi to take a five-wicket haul in women's T20Is.

==== 4th T20I ====
7 November 2019
13:00
Scorecard

| Mozambique; 130/6 (20 overs) | v | Malawi; 112/9 (20 overs) |
| Alcinda Cossa 54* (39); Chimwemwe Juma 2/22 (4 overs) | | Lekeleni Mbendera 22 (15); Alcinda Cossa 3/26 (4 overs) |

Mozambique won by 18 runs
Saint Andrews International High School, Blantyre
Umpires: Jamie Aly (Mwi) and Lloyd Selemani (Mwi)

- Mozambique won the toss and elected to bat.

==== 5th T20I ====
8 November 2019
09:00
Scorecard

| Malawi; 89 (19.5 overs) | v | Mozambique; 91/2 (12 overs) |
| Dyna Rice 19 (16); Christina Magaia 3/17 (4 overs) | | Palmira Cuinica 46 (46); Shahida Hussein 1/14 (2 overs) |

Mozambique won by 8 wickets
Saint Andrews International High School, Blantyre
Umpires: Jamie Aly (Mwi) and Lloyd Selemani (Mwi)

- Malawi won the toss and elected to bat.

==== 6th T20I ====
8 November 2019
13:00
Scorecard

| Mozambique; 88 (15 overs) | v | Malawi; 90/8 (16.2 overs) |
| Rosalia Haiong 13 (9); Vanessa Phiri 4/12 (3 overs) | | Thandie Katunga 15 (31); Paula Mazuze 5/19 (4 overs) |

Malawi won by 2 wickets
Saint Andrews International High School, Blantyre
Umpires: Jamie Aly (Mwi) and Lloyd Selemani (Mwi)

- Malawi won the toss and elected to field.
- Laura Chipanga (Moz) made her T20I debut.
- Paula Mazuze became the first bowler for Mozambique to take a five-wicket haul in women's T20Is.

==== 7th T20I ====
10 November 2019
09:00
Scorecard

| Malawi; 42/3 (10 overs) | v | Mozambique; 38/9 (10 overs) |
| Shahida Hussein 9* (16); Christina Magaia 2/9 (2 overs) | | Cecelia Murrombe 12 (19); Chimwemwe Juma 2/6 (2 overs) |

Malawi won by 4 runs
Saint Andrews International High School, Blantyre
Umpires: Jamie Aly (Mwi) and Osman Mhango (Mwi)

- Mozambique won the toss and elected to field.
- The match was reduced to 10 overs per side due to rain.
