= List of Malawi Twenty20 International cricketers =

This is a list of Malawian Twenty20 International cricketers. In April 2018, the International Cricket Council (ICC) decided to grant full Twenty20 International (T20I) status to all its members. Therefore, all Twenty20 matches played between Malawi and other ICC members after 1 January 2019 have the T20I status.

This list comprises all members of the Malawi cricket team who have played at least one T20I match. It is initially arranged in the order in which each player won his first Twenty20 cap. Where more than one player won his first Twenty20 cap in the same match, those players are listed alphabetically by surname. Malawi played their first T20I matches during the 2019 T20 Kwacha Cup in November 2019.

== Key ==
General

- ‡ – Captain
- † – Wicket-keeper
- First – Year of debut
- Last – Year of latest game
- Mat – Number of matches played

Batting

- Runs – Runs scored in career
- HS – Highest score
- Avg – Runs scored per dismissal
- 50 – Number of half centuries
- * – Batsman remained not out

Bowling

- Balls – Balls bowled in career
- Wkt – Wickets taken in career
- BBI – Best bowling in an innings
- Ave – Average runs per wicket

Fielding

- Ca – Catches taken
- St – Stumpings affected

== List of players ==
Statistics are correct as of 16 August 2026.

Malawi T20I cricketers
General					Batting				Bowling					Fielding		Ref
No.	Name	First	Last	Mat	Runs	HS	Avg	50	Balls	Wkt	BBI	Ave	5WI	Ca	St	Ref
1	Mohamed Abdulla‡	2019	2021	10	118	42*	23.60	0	159	9	3/25	18.22	0	1	0	
2	Moazzam Baig‡	2019	2025	44	457	74	19.04	1	891	68	6/9	10.69	3	15	0	
3	Donnex Kansonkho‡	2019	2026	68	1,021	54	17.91	1	196	11	4/16	22.18	0	29	0	
4	Gift Kansonkho‡	2019	2026	59	693	52	16.11	1	167	12	2/6	19.41	0	17	0	
5	Muhammad Khurram†	2019	2019	5	4	3	1.33	0	–	–	–	–	–	1	0	
6	Michael Mwamadi	2019	2022	12	5	3*	–	0	62	3	2/27	25.33	0	1	0	
7	Hamza Patel	2019	2019	7	137	44	27.40	0	78	2	2/13	52.00	0	6	0	
8	Adil Patel	2019	2019	2	12	6*	12.00	0	6	0	–	–	0	0	0	
9	Mahammed Patel	2019	2019	3	48	40*	48.00	0	72	5	3/25	16.60	0	0	0	
10	Sami Sohail	2019	2026	75	2,192	96*	42.98	14	1,114	76	4/6	16.82	0	30	0	
11	Usama Master	2019	2019	6	15	15	7.50	0	79	5	2/24	21.20	0	1	0	
12	Irfan Bhima	2019	2019	4	98	52	24.50	1	90	6	3/14	8.50	0	0	0	
13	Mohammed Nurji	2019	2019	6	101	36	50.50	0	–	–	–	–	–	2	0	
14	Francis Nkhoma	2019	2024	6	2	2	2.00	0	–	–	–	–	–	0	0	
15	Chisomo Chete†	2019	2026	32	47	18	3.91	0	–	–	–	–	–	18	4	
16	Gershom Ntambalika	2019	2024	29	174	41	12.42	0	144	9	2/13	19.00	0	8	0	
17	Mike Choamba	2021	2026	49	198	28	9.00	0	434	23	4/19	17.43	0	16	0	
18	Alick Kansonkho	2021	2023	7	22	20*	11.00	0	–	–	–	–	–	5	0	
19	Leneck Nakomo	2021	2021	6	–	–	–	–	–	–	–	–	–	1	0	
20	Blessings Pondani	2021	2026	42	10	6	5.00	0	602	18	2/12	39.00	0	5	0	
21	Chikondi Rice	2021	2021	1	–	–	–	–	–	–	–	–	–	0	0	
22	Waliyu Jackson	2021	2023	4	1	1	1.00	0	–	–	–	–	–	3	0	
23	Daniel Jakiel (Note: Daniel Jakiel also played 2 Twenty20 International matches for Zimbabwe. Only his record for Malawi is given above.)	2022	2026	53	237	38*	11.85	0	1,085	72	5/9	17.55	2	14	0	
24	Aaftab Limdawala	2022	2026	62	750	68	17.04	3	571	28	4/23	24.57	0	35	0	
25	Beston Masauko	2022	2023	11	7	5*	2.33	0	–	–	–	–	–	5	0	
26	Suhail Vayani	2023	2026	52	277	30*	10.65	0	965	47	4/8	22.97	0	18	0	
27	Phillip Zuze†	2023	2025	27	90	21	6.92	0	–	–	–	–	–	17	1	
28	Chisomo Malaya	2024	2025	6	0	0*	–	0	–	–	–	–	–	0	0	
29	Bright Balala	2024	2026	30	80	19*	8.88	0	260	6	1/6	67.83	0	6	0	
30	Kelvin Thuchila	2024	2026	7	4	2*	0.80	0	540	31	6/8	16.32	0	5	0	
31	Trust Makaya	2025	2026	10	5	4*	2.50	0	54	2	1/18	26.50	0	1	0	
32	Salim Nihute†	2025	2026	25	380	56	20.00	1	–	–	–	–	–	7	0	
33	Kazim Somani	2025	2026	20	194	31	17.63	1	–	–	–	–	–	2	0	
34	Kennedy Mtunduwatha	2025	2025	1	–	–	–	–	6	0	–	–	–	0	0	
35	Chisomo Tchale	2025	2025	10	4	4	1.33	0	174	6	2/36	42.00	0	0	0	
36	Precious Sapesa	2025	2025	3	0	0	0.00	0	30	0	–	–	0	0	0	
37	Nadim Makkan	2026	2026	5	40	30	8.00	0	–	–	–	–	0	0	0	
