= Morocco national cricket team =

Morocco
- Moroccan Cricket Federation Logo

Personnel
- Captain: Al Amin Shehzad
- Coach: None

International Cricket Council
- ICC status: Expelled (2019) (ICC member: 1999–2019)
- ICC region: Africa

International cricket
- First international: 23 April 2006 v Rwanda at Willowmoore Park, Benoni, South Africa
- As of 31 May 2012

The Moroccan national cricket team was the team that represented the Kingdom of Morocco in international cricket. The team is governed by Federation Royale Marocaine De Cricket.

In April 2018, the ICC decided to grant full Twenty20 International (T20I) status to all its members. Therefore, any Twenty20 matches played between Morocco and other ICC members after 1 January 2019 would have been full T20I, though prior to July 2019 Morocco had not participated in any T20I matches. Owing to violations against the ICC constitution, Morocco were expelled from the ICC in July 2019.

== International history ==
Their international debut came in 2006 when they took part in Division Three of the African region of the ICC World Cricket League. They finished fifth in the eight team tournament. Their most recent international activity has been in the ICC-Africa Division 3 tournament in Benoni, South Africa where the team finished 6th.

Locations of all stadiums which have hosted an international cricket match within Morocco

Morocco boasted an ICC approved ground capable of hosting full internationals, the National Cricket Stadium in Tangier. It hosted a One Day International triangular tournament, the Morocco Cup in 2002, where Sri Lanka won ahead of South Africa and Pakistan.

== Records ==
=== One-day ===
Below is a record of international matches played in the one-day format by Morocco.

Opponent	M	W	L	T	NR
Lesotho	1	1	0	0	0
Mozambique	1	0	1	0	0
Rwanda	2	2	0	0	0
Sierra Leone	1	0	1	0	0
Total	5	3	2	0	0

== See also ==
- Cricket in Morocco
