= Mozambique national cricket team =

Cricket team

Mozambique
- Association: Mozambican Cricket Association

Personnel
- Captain: Filipe Cossa

International Cricket Council
- ICC status: Associate member (2017)
- ICC region: Africa
ICC Rankings	Current	Best-ever
T20I	81st	55th (7-May-2023)

International cricket
- First international: v Rwanda at Willowmoore Park, Benoni, South Africa, 21 March 2004

T20 Internationals
- First T20I: v Malawi at Lilongwe Golf Club, Lilongwe; 6 November 2019
- Last T20I: v Zambia at Nigeria Cricket Federation Oval 2, Abuja; 25 October 2026
T20Is	Played	Won/Lost
Total	55	24/28 (1 tie, 2 no results)
This year	12	6/6 (0 ties, 0 no results)
- As of 25 October 2026

The Mozambique national cricket team is the men's team that represents Mozambique in international cricket. The team is administered by the Mozambican Cricket Association which became an affiliate member of International Cricket Council (ICC) in 2003, and an associate member in 2017. Mozambique is also a member of the Africa Cricket Association. The Mozambique national cricket team has competed in the World Cricket League Africa Region, Cricket World Cup and the ICC Africa Twenty20 Championship.

== History ==
Mozambique became an affiliate member of the ICC in 2003 and an associate member in 2017 when the affiliate status was scrapped.

=== 50-over cricket ===
==== 2003 ====
Their international debut came the following year, when they played in the African Affiliates championship which was the first stage of qualifying for the 2007 Cricket World Cup. They would finish in 6th place after defeating only Rwanda.

==== 2006 ====
Mozambique, as a member of the African Cricket Association, competes in the World Cricket League Africa Region which is a 50 over competition for African countries that aren't full member of the ICC. For this edition, they competed in the third division as they drawn to meet Sierra Leone, Morocco and Rwanda. In the opening match against Sierra Leone, they scored a six wicket win after they bowled out the opposition for only 197. In return, Kaleem Shah top scored with 55 to give the team their first up victory. Kaleem Shah scored the first century of the tournament in the next game against Morocco to get the team to 275 from 50 overs. Morocco in return could only muster up a score of 196 with Shah being the best bowler. The final group game saw Mozambique win the match against Rwanda by 112 runs to finish on top of pool 2. In the semi-final, they took on Ghana and Zainul Patel dominated the bowling with 4 wickets to help in getting the team through to the final. In the final game of the tournament, top scorer Kaleem Shah top scored in the final with him scoring 77 in the 89 run victory to move Mozambique to the next division.

Division Two was held in Tanzania with five teams competing for a spot in Division 1. For Mozambique, they had to compete against Botswana, Nigeria, Tanzania and Zambia.

=== 2018-Present ===
In April 2018, the ICC decided to grant full Twenty20 International (T20I) status to all its members. Therefore, all Twenty20 matches played between Mozambique and other ICC members since 1 January 2019 have been full T20I matches.

Mozambique played their first T20I on 6 November 2019, against Malawi, during the 2019 T20 Kwacha Cup; they lost by three wickets with two balls left.

6 November 2019
10:00
Scorecard

Mozambique; 169/5 (20 overs)	v	Malawi; 170/7 (19.4 overs)
Damiao Couana 71* (36); Mahammed Patel 3/25 (4 overs)		Mahammed Patel 40* (33); Zefanias Matsinhe 3/27 (4 overs)

Malawi won by 3 wickets
Lilongwe Golf Club, Lilongwe
Umpires: Acacio Chitsondzo (Moz) and Osman Mhango (Mwi)

- Malawi won the toss and elected to field.
- First ever T20I match for Mozambique.

== Tournament history ==
=== World Cricket League Division Five ===
World Cricket League Division Five record
Year	Round	Position	GP	W	L	T	NR
(Jersey) 2008	Group stage	8/12	5	1	3	0	1
Total	1/1	–	5	1	3	0	1

=== World Cricket League Africa Region Division Three ===
World Cricket League African Region Division Three record
Year	Round	Position	GP	W	L	T	NR
(South Africa) 2006	Champions	1/8	5	5	0	0	0
Total	1/1	–	5	5	0	0	1

=== World Cricket League Africa Region Division Two ===
World Cricket League African Region Division Two record
Year	Round	Position	GP	W	L	T	NR
(Tanzania) 2006	3rd place	3/5	5	5	0	0	0
(South Africa) 2008	4th place	4/6	5	2	3	0	0
Total	2/3	–	10	7	3	0	0

=== T20 World Cup Africa Sub-regional Qualifier ===
T20 World Cup Africa Sub-regional Qualifier record
Year	Round	Position	GP	W	L	T	NR
(Rwanda) 2021	Round-robin	4/5	4	1	3	0	0
(Rwanda) 2022–23	Round-robin	3/8	7	5	2	0	0
(Kenya) 2024	Round-robin	3/6	5	3	2	0	0
(Nigeria) 2026	Round-robin	4/6	5	2	3	0	0
Total	4/4	–	21	11	10	0	0

== Current squad ==
This lists all the players who were picked for 2024 ICC Men's T20 World Cup Africa Sub-regional Qualifier. Uncapped players are listed in italics. Updated as of 24 October 2024.

Name	Age	Batting style	Bowling style	Notes
Batters
Agostinho Navicha	22	Right-handed	Right-arm leg break	
Vieira Tembo	24	Right-handed	Right-arm medium	
Lourenco Salomone	24	Right-handed	Right-arm leg break	
Mario Manjate	30	Right-handed	Right-arm off break	
All-rounders
Francisco Couana	29	Right-handed	Right-arm medium	
Filipe Cossa	32	Right-handed	Right-arm medium	Captain
Joao Huo	23	Right-handed	Right-arm medium	
Jose Joao	22	Left-handed	Left-arm medium	
Eugenio Azine	20	Right-handed	Right-arm leg break	
Manussur Algi	22	Left-handed	Left-arm medium	
Antonio Laice	22	Right-handed	Right-arm medium	
Wicket-keeper
Farruque Nhaduate	23	Right-handed		
Bowlers
Dario Macome	22	Right-handed	Right-arm medium	
Camate Raposo	21	Right-handed	Left-arm medium	

== Records and statistics ==
International Match Summary — Mozambique

Last updated 25 October 2026

Playing Record
Format	M	W	L	T	NR	Inaugural Match
Twenty20 Internationals	55	24	28	1	2	6 November 2019

=== Twenty20 International ===
- Highest team total: 222/4 v Eswatini on 13 September 2025 at Malkerns Country Club Oval, Malkerns.
- Highest individual score: 126, Joao Hou v Lesotho on 2 June 2026 at Malkerns Country Club Oval, Malkerns.
- Best individual bowling figures: 5/19, Francisco Couana v Cameroon on 3 November 2021 at Gahanga International Cricket Stadium, Kigali.

Most T20I runs for Mozambique

Player	Runs	Average	Career span
Joao Huo	1,098	25.53	2019–2026
Francisco Couana	1,005	31.40	2019–2024
Jose Bulele	800	22.85	2019–2026
Filipe Cossa	550	26.19	2019–2024
Agostinho Navicha	480	20.86	2021–2026

Most T20I wickets for Mozambique

Player	Wickets	Average	Career span
Joao Huo	55	16.01	2019–2026
Jose Bulele	38	19.34	2019–2026
Francisco Couana	36	19.94	2019–2024
Camate Raposo	35	16.77	2022–2026
Filipe Cossa	26	25.38	2019–2024

T20I record versus other nations

Records complete to T20I #4219. Last updated 25 October 2026.

Opponent	M	W	L	T	NR	First match	First win
vs Full Members
Zimbabwe	1	0	1	0	0	20 October 2024	
vs Associate Members
Botswana	3	0	3	0	0	6 November 2021	
Cameroon	2	2	0	0	0	3 November 2021	3 November 2021
Eswatini	17	9	6	1	1	29 July 2022	29 July 2022
Gambia	3	3	0	0	0	8 December 2022	8 December 2022
Ghana	2	1	1	0	0	16 September 2022	2 December 2022
Kenya	1	0	1	0	0	19 October 2024	
Lesotho	4	3	1	0	0	2 June 2026	2 June 2026
Malawi	9	1	7	0	1	6 November 2019	10 November 2019
Nigeria	2	0	2	0	0	1 December 2022	
Rwanda	2	2	0	0	0	17 December 2023	17 December 2023
Seychelles	1	1	0	0	0	22 October 2024	22 October 2024
Sierra Leone	2	1	1	0	0	5 November 2021	9 December 2022
Tanzania	2	0	2	0	0	2 November 2021	
Uganda	3	0	3	0	0	18 September 2022	
Zambia	1	1	0	0	0	25 October 2025	25 October 2025

=== Other records ===
For a list of selected international matches played by Mozambique, see Cricket Archive.

== See also ==
- List of Mozambique Twenty20 International cricketers
