= Malawi national cricket team =

Cricket team

Malawi
- Association: Cricket Malawi

Personnel
- Captain: Gift Kansonkho
- Coach: Andre Botha

International Cricket Council
- ICC status: Associate member (2003)
- ICC region: Africa
ICC Rankings	Current	Best-ever
T20I	53rd	49th (28 May 2023)

International cricket
- First international: 21 March 2004 v Gambia at Willowmoore Park, Benoni, South Africa

T20 Internationals
- First T20I: v Mozambique at Lilongwe Golf Club, Lilongwe; 6 November 2019
- Last T20I: v Rwanda at TCA Oval, Blantyre; 16 August 2026
T20Is	Played	Won/Lost
Total	75	35/37 (0 ties, 3 no results)
This year	9	4/5 (0 ties, 0 no results)
- T20 World Cup Qualifier appearances: 1 (Note: T20 World Cup Qualifier refers to the Regional Final of the ICC Africa region from the 2023 edition.) (first in 2025)
- Best result: 7th place (2025)
T20I kit
- As of 16 August 2026

The Malawian national cricket team is the men's team that represents Malawi in international cricket.

== History ==
Malawi was previously a member of the East and Central Africa Cricket Conference, which was a member of the International Cricket Council (ICC) from 1989 to 2003 and fielded the East and Central Africa cricket team in the ICC Trophy.

From the 1970s, Malawi played regular international tournaments against other East and Central African teams, and occasionally against touring teams from England.

In 2002 Malawi participated in the Africa Cup in which 10 nations took part. Malawi came last in the group, losing all 4 matches.

They became an affiliate member of the International Cricket Council (ICC) in 2003 and an associate member in 2017. Their international debut came the following year in the African affiliates championship, where they came fourth. They participated in the equivalent tournament in 2006, Division Three of the African region of the World Cricket League, once again coming fourth.

In October 2009 Malawi hosted the WCL Africa Div 3 tournament, beating all participants to win the tournament. They were promoted to WCL Africa Division 2 for the next tournament in Benoni, SA. They struggled at this level and finished last.

=== 2018–present ===
In April 2018, the ICC decided to grant full Twenty20 International (T20I) status to all its members. Therefore, all Twenty20 matches played between Malawi and other ICC members since 1 January 2019 have the full T20I status.

Malawi played their first T20I on 6 November 2019, against Mozambique, during the 2019 T20 Kwacha Cup.

6 November 2019
10:00
Scorecard

Mozambique; 169/5 (20 overs)	v	Malawi; 170/7 (19.4 overs)
Damiao Couana 71* (36); Mahammed Patel 3/25 (4 overs)		Mahammed Patel 40* (33); Zefanias Matsinhe 3/27 (4 overs)

Malawi won by 3 wickets
Lilongwe Golf Club, Lilongwe
Umpires: Acacio Chitsondzo (Moz) and Osman Mhango (Mwi)

- Malawi won the toss and elected to field.
- First ever T20I match for Malawi.

== Grounds ==
Locations of grounds which have hosted international cricket matches within Malawi

== Squad ==
This lists all the players who have played for Malawi in the past 12 months or have been part of the latest T20I squad. Updated as of 6 July 2024

Name	Age	Batting style	Bowling style	Notes
Batters
Donnex Kansonkho	27	Left-handed	Right-arm medium	
Gift Kansonkho	27	Right-handed	Right-arm medium	
Chisomo Malaya	21	Right-handed	Right-arm leg break	
Beston Masauko	22	Right-handed		
Francis Nkhoma	28	Right-handed		
All-rounders
Sami Sohail	24	Right-handed	Right-arm medium	
Aaftab Limdawala	22	Left-handed	Right-arm leg break	Vice-captain
Moazzam Baig	41	Right-handed	Right-arm off break	Captain
Gershom Ntambalika	31	Right-handed	Right-arm medium	
Wicket-keepers
Phillip Zuze	20	Right-handed		
Chisomo Chete	32	Right-handed		
Spin Bowlers
Suhail Vayani	18	Right-handed	Right-arm leg break	
Mike Choamba	22	Right-handed	Right-arm off break	
Pace Bowlers
Daniel Jakiel	35	Right-handed	Right-arm fast-medium	
Blessings Pondani	24	Right-handed	Right-arm medium-fast	
Bright Balala	19	Right-handed	Right-arm medium-fast	

== Records and statistics ==
International Match Summary — Malawi

Last updated 16 August 2026

Playing Record
Format	M	W	L	T	NR	Inaugural Match
Twenty20 Internationals	75	35	37	0	3	6 November 2019

=== Twenty20 International ===
- Highest team total: 185/2 v Lesotho on 25 November 2022 at Gahanga International Cricket Stadium, Kigali.
- Highest individual score: 96*, Sami Sohail v Rwanda on 26 July 2025 at Gahanga International Cricket Stadium, Kigali.
- Best individual bowling figures: 6/8, Kelvin Thuchila v Eswatini on 27 March 2026 at Achimota Oval B, Accra.

Most T20I runs for Malawi

Player	Runs	Average	Career span
Sami Sohail	2,192	42.98	2019–2026
Donnex Kansonkho	1,021	17.91	2021–2026
Aaftab Limdawala	750	17.04	2022–2026
Gift Kansonkho	693	16.11	2019–2026
Moazzam Baig	457	19.04	2019–2025

Most T20I wickets for Malawi

Player	Wickets	Average	Career span
Sami Sohail	76	16.82	2019–2026
Daniel Jakiel	72	17.55	2022–2026
Moazzam Baig	68	10.69	2019–2025
Suhail Vayani	47	22.97	2023–2026
Kelvin Thuchila	31	16.32	2024–2026

T20I record versus other nations

Records complete to T20I #4080. Last updated 16 August 2026.

Opponent	M	W	L	T	NR	First match	First win
vs Associate Members
Bahrain	7	0	7	0	0	7 July 2025	
Botswana	4	2	2	0	0	20 November 2022	20 November 2022
Cameroon	2	2	0	0	0	15 September 2022	15 September 2022
Eswatini	3	3	0	0	0	17 October 2021	17 October 2021
Germany	3	1	2	0	0	5 July 2025	10 July 2025
Ghana	3	1	2	0	0	19 October 2021	22 September 2024
Kenya	6	1	4	0	1	16 September 2022	28 September 2025
Lesotho	3	3	0	0	0	22 October 2021	22 October 2021
Mali	2	2	0	0	0	21 November 2022	21 November 2022
Mozambique	9	7	1	0	1	6 November 2019	6 November 2019
Namibia	1	0	1	0	0	30 September 2025	
Nigeria	1	0	1	0	0	26 September 2025	
Rwanda	18	9	9	0	0	22 October 2021	22 October 2021
Saint Helena	1	1	0	0	0	24 November 2022	24 November 2022
Seychelles	3	2	0	0	1	20 October 2021	20 October 2021
Tanzania	4	0	4	0	0	20 September 2022	
Uganda	3	0	3	0	0	16 October 2021	
Zambia	2	1	1	0	0	11 August 2026	11 August 2026

=== Other records ===
For a list of selected international matches played by Malawi, see Cricket Archive.

== Tournament history ==
=== T20 World Cup Africa Regional Final ===
T20 World Cup Africa Regional Final record
Year	Round	Position	GP	W	L	T	NR
(Uganda) 2019	Did not qualify						
(Rwanda) 2021	Did not qualify						
(Namibia) 2022	Did not qualify						
(Zimbabwe) 2025	Group stage	7/8	5	2	3	0	0
Total	1/4	0 Title	5	2	3	0	0

=== ACA Africa T20 Cup ===
ACA Cup T20 record
Year	Round	Position	GP	W	L	T	NR
(South Africa) 2022	Group stage	6/8	3	1	2	0	0
(South Africa) 2023	Semi-finals	4/8	5	2	3	0	0
Total	0 titles	2/2	8	3	5	0	0

=== Other tournaments ===
WCL African region (List A)	T20WC Africa Sub-regional Qualifiers (T20I)
2006 (Division Three): 4th place; 2008 (Division Three): 5th place; 2009 (Division Three): 1st place; 2010 (Division Two): 6th place	2018 (South): 5th place; 2021: 3rd place; 2022: 3rd place; 2024: Runners-up — Advanced

== See also ==
- List of Malawi Twenty20 International cricketers
- Malawi women's national cricket team
