= World Cricket League Division Seven =

WCL Division Seven
- Administrator: ICC
- Format: 50 overs
- First edition: 2009
- Latest edition: 2013
- Tournament format: Round robin, playoffs
- Number of teams: 6
- Most successful: Bahrain; Kuwait; Nigeria

ICC World Cricket League Division Seven was the second-lowest division of the World Cricket League (WCL) system for its 2009–14 and 2012–18 cycles. Like all other divisions, WCL Division Seven was contested as a standalone tournament rather than as an actual league.

The inaugural Division Seven tournament was held in 2009, hosted by Guernsey and won by Bahrain. The 2011 and 2013 tournaments were both held in Botswana, and won by Kuwait and Nigeria, respectively. Because the WCL operates on a system of promotion and relegation, teams generally only participated in one or two Division Seven tournaments before being either promoted to Division Six or relegated, either to Division Eight or to regional competitions. Overall, 13 teams played in at least one Division Seven tournament, with Nigeria the only team to feature in all three tournaments.

== Results ==
Year	Host(s)	Venue(s)	Final		
Year	Host(s)	Venue(s)	Winner	Result	Runner-up
2009	Guernsey	various	Bahrain; 207/7 (46.1 overs)	Bahrain won by 3 wickets scorecard	Guernsey; 204/9 (50 overs)
2011	Botswana	Gaborone	Kuwait; 219/9 (50 overs)	Kuwait won by 72 runs scorecard	Nigeria; 147 (36.5 overs)
2013	Botswana	Gaborone	Nigeria; 134/4 (32.1 overs)	Nigeria won by 6 wickets (D/L) scorecard	Vanuatu; 133 (38.4 overs)

== Performance by team ==
Legend

- 1st – Champions
- 2nd – Runners-up
- 3rd – Third place
- Q – Qualified
- — Hosts

Team	(Guernsey) 2009	(Botswana) 2011	(Botswana) 2013	Total
Bahrain	1st	—	—	1
Botswana	—	4th	3rd	2
Fiji	—	—	4th	1
Germany	—	3rd	6th	2
Ghana	—	—	5th	1
Gibraltar	6th	—	—	1
Guernsey	2nd	—	—	1
Japan	4th	6th	—	2
Kuwait	—	1st	—	1
Nigeria	3rd	2nd	1st	3
Norway	—	5th	—	1
Suriname	5th	—	—	1
Vanuatu	—	—	2nd	1

== Player statistics ==
Year	Most runs	Most wickets	Ref
2009	(Guernsey) Jeremy Frith (364)	(Bahrain) Qamar Saeed (14)	
2011	(Botswana) Faisal Rana (230)	(Germany) Rana-Javed Iqbal (18)	
2013	(Nigeria) Dotun Olatunji (355)	(Nigeria) Joshua Ogunlola (17) (Botswana) Russel Withey (17)	
