= 2013 ICC World Cricket League Division Seven =

- Administrator: International Cricket Council
- Cricket format: Limited-overs (50 overs)
- Tournament format(s): Round-robin and Playoffs
- Host: Botswana
- Champions: Nigeria
- Participants: 6
- Matches: 18
- Player of the series: Dotun Olatunji (Ngr)
- Most runs: Dotun Olatunji (Ngr)
- Most wickets: Joshua Ogunlola (Ngr)
- Official website: ICC World Cricket League

The 2013 ICC World Cricket League Division Seven was a cricket tournament that took place from 6 to 13 April 2013. It formed part of the ICC World Cricket League and qualifying for the 2019 Cricket World Cup. Botswana hosted the event.

== Teams ==
The teams that took part in the tournament were decided according to the results of the 2011 ICC World Cricket League Division Seven, the 2011 ICC World Cricket League Division Six and the 2012 ICC World Cricket League Division Eight.

Team	Last outcome
Nigeria	Relegated from 2011 ICC World Cricket League Division Six after finishing 5th
Fiji	Relegated from 2011 ICC World Cricket League Division Six after finishing 6th
Germany	Still from 2011 ICC World Cricket League Division Seven after finishing 3rd
Botswana	Still from 2011 ICC World Cricket League Division Seven after finishing 4th
Vanuatu	Promoted from 2012 ICC World Cricket League Division Eight after finishing 1st
Ghana	Promoted from 2012 ICC World Cricket League Division Eight after finishing 2nd

== Squads ==
Botswana	Fiji	Germany	Ghana	Nigeria	Vanuatu
Karabo Modise (C); Feroze Essack; Nabil Master; Tshepo Mhozya; Saad Mohyuddin; Karabo Motlhanka; Hasantha Mudiyanselage; Thabang Nshomane; Faisal Rana; Ameer Saiyed; Denzil Sequeira (Wk); Waseem Tajbhay; Thatayaone Tshose; Russel Withey	Jone Seuvou (C); Noa Acawei; Sevunivola Baba (Wk); Joji Bulabalavu; Iniasi Cakacaka; Samuela Draunivudi; Jikoi Kida; Vuiyasawa Mateiwaqa; Tomasi Nawaciono; Sekove Ravoka; Josefa Rika; Kitiano Tavo; Tukana Tavo; Viliame Yabaki	Asif Khan (C); Farooq Ahmed; Imran Chaudhry; Milano Fernando; Shakeel Hassan; Rana Javed Iqbal; Bilal Jafar; Ehsan Latif; André Leslie; Ajitabh Malviya (Wk); Sohel Mia; Asad Mohammad; Dilshan Rajudeen; Wasantha de Silva	Peter Ananya (C); Isaac Aboagye; Moses Anafie; Simon Ateak; Vincent Ateak; Samson Awiah; Kofi Bagabena; Francis Bakiweyem; Godfrey Bakiweyem; Mark Bawa (Wk); Matthew Bawa; Obed Harvey; Julius Mensah (Wk); James Vifah	Kunle Adegbola (C); Sesan Adedeji; Saheed Akolade; Olalekan Awolowo; Olajide Bejide; Endurance Ofem; Joshua Ogunlola; Dotun Olatunji; Segun Olayinka (Wk); Oluseye Olympio; Ademola Onikoyi (Wk); Chimezie Onwuzulike; Osita Onwuzulike; Ricky Sharma (Wk)	Andrew Mansale (C); Jelany Chilia; Jonathon Dunn; Trevor Langa (Wk); Steven Lynch; Patrick Matautaava; Nalin Nipiko; Simpson Obed; Joshua Rasu; Jaxies Samuel; Damian Smith; Appolinaire Stephen; Kenny Tari; Niko Unalavu

== Fixtures ==
=== Round robin ===
==== Points table ====
Pos	Team	Pld	W	L	T	NR	Pts	NRR	Qualification
1	Vanuatu	5	5	0	0	0	10	1.918	Qualified for 2013 Division Six and final
2	Nigeria	5	3	2	0	0	6	0.722	Qualified for 2013 Division Six and final
3	Fiji	5	3	2	0	0	6	0.702	3rd place playoff
4	Botswana	5	2	2	1	0	5	−0.529	3rd place playoff
5	Ghana	5	1	4	0	0	2	−0.593	5th place playoff
6	Germany	5	0	4	1	0	1	−2.042	5th place playoff

==== Matches ====
6 April
Scorecard

Vanuatu; 200 (39.3 overs)	v	Germany; 99 (27 overs)
Trevor Langa 55 (53); Bilal Jafar 3/37 (7 overs)		Wasantha de Silva 31 (40); Niko Unavalu 4/21 (7 overs)

Vanuatu won by 101 runs
Botswana Cricket Association Oval 2, Gaborone
Umpires: Ravi Angara (Bot) and Claude Thorburn (Nam)
Player of the match: Patrick Matautaava (Van)

- Vanuatu won the toss and elected to bat.

6 April
Scorecard

Ghana; 128 (37.2 overs)	v	Botswana; 129/7 (39.4 overs)
Isaac Aboagye 26 (23); Russell Withey 4/24 (7.2 overs)		Waseem Tajbhay 35 (78); Vincent Ateak 2/22 (10 overs)

Botswana win by 3 wickets
Lobatse Cricket Ground, Lobatse
Umpires: Vinay Kumar (Nep) and Munir Khan (Ken)
Player of the match: Nabil Master (Bot)

- Botswana won the toss and elected to field.

6 April
Scorecard

Nigeria; 69 (18.2 overs)	v	Fiji; 70/7 (22.1 overs)
Ricky Sharma 13 (30); Takuna Tavo 5/38 (9 overs)		Sekove Ravoka 20* (38); Joshua Ogunlola 2/17 (6 overs)

Fiji win by 3 wickets
Botswana Cricket Association Oval 1, Gaborone
Umpires: Johan Cloete (SA) and Nigel Morrison (Van)
Player of the match: Takuna Tavo (Fij)

- Nigeria won the toss and elected to bat.

7 April
Scorecard

Ghana; 254/9 (50 overs)	v	Nigeria; 256/4 (44.1 overs)
James Vifah 41 (82); Saheed Akolade 3/43 (10 overs)		Dotun Olatunji 127 (105); Kofi Bagabena 2/29 (6.1 overs)

Nigeria won by 6 wickets
Botswana Cricket Association Oval 1, Gaborone
Umpires: Johnny Gomez (Uga) and Claude Thorburn (Nam)
Player of the match: Dotun Olatunji (Ngr)

- Ghana won the toss and elected to bat.

7 April
Scorecard

Fiji; 232/8 (50 overs)	v	Germany; 69 (25.1 overs)
Sekove Ravoka 58 (74); Sohel Mia 3/35 (10 overs)		Dilshan Rajudeen 20 (29); Iniasi Cakacaka 4/15 (7 overs)

Fiji won by 163 runs
Lobatse Cricket Ground, Lobatse
Umpires: Ravi Angara (Bot) and Nigel Morrison (Van)
Player of the match: Kitiano Tavo (Fij)

- Fiji won the toss and elected to bat.

7 April
Scorecard

Vanuatu; 265/8 (50 overs)	v	Botswana; 242/8 (50 overs)
Nalin Nipiko 82 (82); Nabil Master 3/44 (10 overs)		Waseem Tajbhay 64 (87); Nalin Nipiko 3/22 (8 overs)

Vanuatu won by 23 runs
Botswana Cricket Association Oval 2, Gaborone
Umpires: Johan Cloete (SA) and Munir Khan (Ken)
Player of the match: Nalin Nipiko (Van)

- Botswana won the toss and elected to field.

9 April
Scorecard

Fiji; 139 (43.4 overs)	v	Vanuatu; 142/4 (21.5 overs)
Jikoi Kida 38 (48); Jelany Chilia 2/18 (10 overs)		Trevor Langa 64 (51); Tukana Tavo 2/42 (8 overs)

Vanuatu won by 6 wickets
Botswana Cricket Association Oval 1, Gaborone
Umpires: Ravi Angara (Bot) and Vinay Kumar (Nep)
Player of the match: Trevor Langa (Van)

- Fiji won the toss and elected to bat.

9 April
Scorecard

Germany; 185/8 (50 overs)	v	Ghana; 186/6 (32.3 overs)
Andre Leslie 66 (131); Isaac Aboagye 3/24 (8 overs)		Obed Harvey 52 (49); Asad Mohammad 3/48 (10 overs)

Ghana won by 4 wickets
Lobatse Cricket Ground, Lobatse
Umpires: Johan Cloete (SA) and Claude Thorburn (Nam)
Player of the match: Obed Harvey (Gha)

- Ghana won the toss and elected to field.

9 April
Scorecard

Nigeria; 287/7 (50 overs)	v	Botswana; 116 (27.3 overs)
Dotun Olatunji 125* (95); Nabil Master 4/42 (10 overs)		Faisal Rana 32 (25); Joshua Ogunlola 5/28 (9.3 overs)

Nigeria won by 171 runs
Botswana Cricket Association Oval 2, Gaborone
Umpires: Johnny Gomez (Uga) and Nigel Morrison (Van)
Player of the match: Dotun Olatunji (Ngr)

- Botswana won the toss and elected to field.

10 April
Scorecard

Vanuatu; 238/4 (50 overs)	v	Nigeria; 164/9 (50 overs)
Andrew Mansale 57* (83); Joshua Ogunlola 2/37 (10 overs)		Chimezie Onwuzulike 32* (44); Jelany Chilia 2/18 (10 overs)

Vanuatu won by 74 runs
Lobatse Cricket Ground, Lobatse
Umpires: Ravi Angara (Bot) and Johnny Gomez (Uga)
Player of the match: Patrick Matautaava (Van)

- Nigeria won the toss and elected to field.

10 April
Scorecard

Germany; 211 (49.2 overs)	v	Botswana; 211 (50 overs)
Milano Fernando 55 (58); Karabo Modise 4/21 (8 overs)		Faisal Rana 96 (119); Wasantha de Silva 3/17 (6 overs)

Match tied
Botswana Cricket Association Oval 1, Gaborone
Umpires: Munir Khan (Ken) and Claude Thorburn (Nam)
Player of the match: Faisal Rana (Bot)

- Germany won the toss and elected to bat.

10 April
Scorecard

Fiji; 223 (44.5 overs)	v	Ghana; 205 (46.5 overs)
Josefa Rika 76 (122); Kofi Bagabena 5/25 (4.5 overs)		Obed Harvey 48 (75); Tukana Tavo 2/27 (8.5 overs)

Fiji won by 18 runs
Botswana Cricket Association Oval 2, Gaborone
Umpires: Johan Cloete (SA) and Vinay Kumar (Nep)
Player of the match: Jikoi Kida (Fij)

- Ghana won the toss and elected to field.

12 April
Scorecard

Ghana; 115 (32.4 overs)	v	Vanuatu; 116/2 (22.1 overs)
Kofi Bagabena 23 (62); Appolinaire Stephen 6/30 (10 overs)		Trevor Langa 54 (44); Vincent Ateak 2/23 (9.1 overs)

Vanuatu won by 8 wickets
Botswana Cricket Association Oval 1, Gaborone
Umpires: Johnny Gomez (Uga) and Munir Khan (Ken)
Player of the match: Appolinaire Stephen (Van)

- Ghana won the toss and elected to bat.

12 April
Scorecard

Nigeria; 308/7 (50 overs)	v	Germany; 148 (28 overs)
Ademola Onikoyi 73 (66); Farooq Ahmed 3/63 (8 overs)		Dilshan Rajudeen 30 (27); Joshua Ogunlola 5/34 (10 overs)

Nigeria won by 160 runs
Botswana Cricket Association Oval 2, Gaborone
Umpires: Ravi Angara (Bot) and Johan Cloete (SA)
Player of the match: Joshua Ogunlola (Ngr)

- Germany won the toss and elected to field.

12 April
Scorecard

Botswana; 198 (47.2 overs)	v	Fiji; 176 (48.4 overs)
Karabo Modise 35 (26); Tukana Tavo 3/22 (7 overs)		Kitiano Tavo 62* (64); Russell Withey 4/30 (9.4 overs)

Botswana won by 22 runs
Lobatse Cricket Ground, Lobatse
Umpires: Vinay Kumar (Nep) and Nigel Morrison (Van)
Player of the match: Russell Withey (Bot)

- Fiji won the toss and elected to field.

=== Playoffs ===
==== 5th place playoff ====
13 April
Scorecard

Ghana; 141/9 (25.0 overs)	v	Germany; 133/9 (25.0 overs)
Samson Awiah 32 (38); Sohel Mia 3/35 (5 overs)		Milano Fernando 38 (47); Samson Awiah 2/26 (5 overs)

Ghana won by 8 runs
Lobatse Cricket Ground, Lobatse
Umpires: Ravi Angara (Bot) and Johnny Gomez (Uga)
Player of the match: Samson Awiah (Gha)

- Germany won the toss and elected to field

==== 3rd place playoff ====
13 April
Scorecard

Fiji; 141 (35.4 overs)	v	Botswana; 146/7 (29.3 overs)
Sekove Ravoka 40* (68); Hasantha Mudiyanselage 3/26 (7.4 overs)		Waseem Tajbhay 39* (43); Kitiano Tavo 3/49 (10 overs)

Botswana won by 3 wickets (D/L)
Botswana Cricket Association Oval 2, Gaborone
Umpires: Munir Khan (Ken) and Nigel Morrison (Van)
Player of the match: Hasantha Mudiyanselage (Bot)

- Fiji won the toss and elected to bat

==== Final ====
13 April
Scorecard

Vanuatu; 133 (38.4 overs)	v	Nigeria; 134/4 (32.1 overs)
Andrew Mansale 25 (29); Chimezie Onwuzulike 3/38 (9 overs)		Dotun Olatunji 67* (64); Niko Unavalu 4/27 (8 overs)

Nigeria won by 6 wickets (D/L)
Botswana Cricket Association Oval 1, Gaborone
Umpires: Vinay Kumar (Nep) and Claude Thorburn (Nam)
Player of the match: Dotun Olatunji (Ngr)

- Vanuatu won the toss and elected to bat

== Statistics ==
=== Most runs ===
The top five highest run scorers (total runs) are included in this table.

Player	Team	Runs	Inns	Avg	S/R	HS	100s	50s
Dotun Olatunji	Nigeria	355	6	88.75	119.93	127	2	1
Trevor Langa	Vanuatu	212	6	35.33	98.14	64	0	3
Faisal Rana	Botswana	170	6	28.33	81.73	96	0	1
Nalin Nipiko	Vanuatu	165	5	41.25	85.49	82	0	2
Jikoi Kida	Fiji	160	6	26.66	85.49	69	0	1

=== Most wickets ===
The following table contains the five leading wicket-takers.

Player	Team	Wkts	Mts	Ave	S/R	Econ	BBI
Joshua Ogunlola	Nigeria	17	6	11.82	18.8	3.75	5/28
Russel Withey	Botswana	17	6	13.64	18.7	4.37	4/24
Nabil Master	Botswana	13	6	19.23	24.4	4.71	4/42
Tukana Tavo	Fiji	12	5	12.83	18.9	4.07	5/38
Sohel Mia	Germany	12	5	14.41	22.5	3.84	3/33

== Final Placings ==
After the conclusion of the tournament the teams were distributed as follows:

Pos	Team	Status
1st	Nigeria	Promoted to Division Six for 2013
2nd	Vanuatu	Promoted to Division Six for 2013
3rd	Botswana	Relegated to regional tournaments
4th	Fiji	Relegated to regional tournaments
5th	Ghana	Relegated to regional tournaments
6th	Germany	Relegated to regional tournaments
