= 2011 ICC World Cricket League Division Seven =

- Administrator: International Cricket Council
- Cricket format: List A
- Tournament format: Round-robin
- Host: Botswana
- Champions: Kuwait
- Participants: 6
- Matches: 18
- Player of the series: Mohammad Murad (Kuw)
- Most runs: Faisal Rana (Bot)
- Most wickets: Rana-Javed Iqbal (Ger)
- Official website: ICC World Cricket League

The 2011 ICC World Cricket League Division Seven was a cricket tournament that took place from 1 to 8 May 2011. It formed part of the ICC World Cricket League and qualifying for the 2015 Cricket World Cup. Botswana hosted the event.

== Teams ==
The teams that took part in the tournament were decided according to the results of the 2009 ICC World Cricket League Division Seven, the 2009 ICC World Cricket League Division Six and the 2010 ICC World Cricket League Division Eight.

Team	Last outcome
Botswana	Relegated from 2009 ICC World Cricket League Division Six after finishing 5th
Norway	Relegated from 2009 ICC World Cricket League Division Six after finishing 6th
Nigeria	Still from 2009 ICC World Cricket League Division Seven after finishing 3rd
Japan	Still from 2009 ICC World Cricket League Division Seven after finishing 4th
Kuwait	Promoted from 2010 ICC World Cricket League Division Eight after finishing 1st
Germany	Promoted from 2010 ICC World Cricket League Division Eight after finishing 2nd

== Squads ==
Botswana	Germany	Japan	Kuwait	Norway	Nigeria
Akrum Chand (C); Karabo Modise; Omar Ali; Tshepo Mhozya; Mosa Gaolekwe; Segolame Ramatu; Karabo Motlhanka; Waseem Tajbhay; Aslam Chand; Denzil Sequeira (Wk); James Moses; Faisal Rana; Abdul Patel; Noor Ahmad	Asif Khan (C); Rana-Javed Iqbal; Rajeev Vohra; Ehsaan Latif; Farooq Ahmed; Srinivas Satyanarayana (Wk); Milan Fernando; Kashif Halder; Rishi Pillai; Shakeel Hassan; Tarun Rawat; André Leslie; Ashwin Prakash; Khalid Butt	Masaomi Kobayashi (C); Munir Ahmed; Gavin Beath; Tatsuro Chino (Wk); Patrick Giles-Jones; Takuro Hagihara; Ko Irie; Prashant Kale; Raheel Kano; Naoki Miyaji; Naotsune Miyaji; Satoshi Nakano; Kazuyuki Ogawa; Tomoki Ota	Hisham Mirza (C); Saud Qamar; Azmatullah Nazeer; Abdullah Akhunzada; Mohammad Murad; Mohammad Akhudzada (Wk); Haroon Shahid; Saad Khalid; Mohammed Naseer; Irfan Bhatti; Sibtain Raza (Wk); Jagath Rosantha (Wk); Midhun Pakalapati; Abid Mushtaq	Damien Shortis (C); Iram Dawood; Iftikhar Suhail (Wk); Sheraz Khalid; Babar Shahzad; Usman Saeed; Ehtsam Ul Haq (Wk); Shahid Ahmed; Muhammad Butt; Shahid Mahmood; Waseem Gill; Adeel Ibrar; Gulfam Butt; Umran Shahzad	Endurance Ofem (C); Adenkule Adegbola; Ademola Onikoyi (Wk); Saheed Akolade; Olalekan Awolowo; Olajide Bejide; Joshua Ogunlola; Akabogu Okwudili; Segun Olayinka (Wk); Temitope Olayinka; Oluseye Olympio; Femi Oduyebo; Ramit Gill; Sean Philips

== Fixtures ==
=== Group stage ===
==== Points table ====
Pos	Team	Pld	W	L	T	NR	Pts	NRR	
1	Nigeria	5	4	1	0	0	8	0.558	Met in the final and promoted to Division Six for 2011
2	Kuwait	5	3	1	0	1	7	1.466	Met in the final and promoted to Division Six for 2011
3	Germany	5	3	2	0	0	6	0.357	Met in the 3rd place playoff and remained in Division Seven for 2013
4	Botswana	5	3	2	0	0	6	−0.438	Met in the 3rd place playoff and remained in Division Seven for 2013
5	Norway	5	1	4	0	0	2	−0.190	Met in the 5th place playoff and relegated to Division Eight for 2012
6	Japan	5	0	4	0	1	1	−1.588	Met in the 5th place playoff and relegated to Division Eight for 2012

==== Matches ====
1 May
Scorecard

Botswana; 119 (40.3 overs)	v	Kuwait; 120/7 (18.4 overs)
James Moses 34 (54); Mohammad Murad 3/30 (7.3 overs)		Hisham Mirza 51* (51); Aslam Chand 3/36 (6 overs)

Kuwait won by 3 wickets
Botswana Cricket Association Oval 2, Gaborone
Umpires: Wynand Louw (Nam) and David Odhiambo (Ken)
Player of the match: Hisham Mirza (Kuw)

- Kuwait won the toss and elected to field
- Rain reduced both innings to 45 overs.

1 May
Scorecard

Japan; 146 (49.3 overs)	v	Germany; 147/1 (30.4 overs)
Patrick James Giles 56* (116); Rana-Javed Iqbal 6/25 (10 overs)		Andre Leslie 49* (86); Munir Ahmed 1/21 (4 overs)

Germany won by 9 wickets
Lobatse Cricket Ground
Umpires: Lalji Bhudia (Ken) and Patrick Mukumbi (Bot)
Player of the match: Rana-Javed Iqbal (Ger)

- Japan won the toss and elected to bat

1 May
Scorecard

Norway; 166 (42 overs)	v	Nigeria; 168/5 (38.2 overs)
Shahid Ahmed 37 (55); Endurance Ofem 3/12 (3 overs)		Ademola Onikoyi 40 (32); Umran Shahzad 2/18 (8 overs)

Nigeria won by 5 wickets
Botswana Cricket Association Oval 1, Gaborone
Umpires: Steven Douglas (Ber) and Rudi Koertzen (SA)
Player of the match: Ramit Gill (Ngr)

- Nigeria won the toss and elected to field
- Rain reduced both innings to 43 overs.

2 May
Scorecard

Japan; 84 (31.4 overs)	v	Botswana; 86/2 (29.5 overs)
Munir Ahmed 22 (39); Karobo Modise 4/9 (4.4 overs)		Faisal Rana 26 (44); Munir Ahmed 1/13 (8 overs)

Botswana won by 8 wickets
Botswana Cricket Association Oval 1, Gaborone
Umpires: Lalji Bhudia (Ken) and Rockie D'Mello (Ken)
Player of the match: Karabo Modise (Bot)

- Botswana won the toss and elected to field

2 May
Scorecard

Germany; 166/9 (50 overs)	v	Nigeria; 168/8 (44.4 overs)
Milan Fernando 82 (130); Endurance Ofem 2/24 (10 overs)		Sean Philips 71* (100); Rana-Javed Iqbal 3/32 (8.4 overs)

Nigeria won by 2 wickets
Lobatse Cricket Ground
Umpires: Steven Douglas (Ber) and David Odhiambo (Ken)
Player of the match: Sean Philips (Ngr)

- Nigeria won the toss and elected to field

2 May
Scorecard

Norway; 246/7 (50 overs)	v	Kuwait; 249/3 (44.2 overs)
Muhammad Butt 72* (102); Mohammad Murad 6/39 (10 overs)		Sibtain Raza 77* (88); Iram Dawood 2/45 (7 overs)

Kuwait won by 7 wickets
Botswana Cricket Association Oval 2, Gaborone
Umpires: Rudi Koertzen (SA) and Patrick Mukumbi (Bot)
Player of the match: Mohammad Murad (Kuw)

- Norway won the toss and elected to bat

4 May
Scorecard

Germany; 229/8 (47 overs)	v	Botswana; 230/8 (45.1 overs)
Farooq Ahmed 69 (99); Omar Ali 3/43 (10 overs)		Karabo Modise 65 (70); Rana-Javed Iqbal 2/25 (10 overs)

Botswana won by 2 wickets
Botswana Cricket Association Oval 1, Gaborone
Umpires: Lalji Bhudia (Ken) and Rudi Koertzen (SA)
Player of the match: Omar Ali (Bot)

- Botswana won the toss and elected to field

4 May
Scorecard

Nigeria; 153 (49.4 overs)	v	Kuwait; 156/1 (25 overs)
Sean Philips 75 (125); Saad Khalid 5/24 (6.4 overs)		Irfan Bhatti 83* (76); Joshua Ogunlola 1/34 (5 overs)

Kuwait won by 9 wickets
Lobatse Cricket Ground
Umpires: Rockie D'Mello (Ken) and Patric Makumbi (Uga)
Player of the match: Saad Khalid (Kuw)

- Kuwait won the toss and elected to field

4 May
Scorecard

Norway; 244/9 (50 overs)	v	Japan; 191 (48.3 overs)
Muhammad Butt 98 (126); Patrick Giles-Jones 4/48 (10 overs)		Ko Irie 56* (97); Muhammad Butt 4/41 (10 overs)

Norway won by 53 runs
Botswana Cricket Association Oval 2, Gaborone
Umpires: Steven Douglas (Ber) and Wynand Louw (Nam)
Player of the match: Muhammad Butt (Nor)

- Japan won the toss and elected to field

5 May
Scorecard

Norway; 272/8 (50 overs)	v	Botswana; 277/2 (46.4 overs)
Damien Shortis 91 (129); Akrum Chand 2/20 (3 overs)		Faisal Rana 158* (143); Babar Shahzad 1/40 (10 overs)

Botswana won by 8 wickets
Lobatse Cricket Ground
Umpires: Rudi Koertzen (SA) and David Odhiambo (Ken)
Player of the match: Faisal Rana (Bot)

- Norway won the toss and elected to bat.

5 May
Scorecard

Germany; 188 (48 overs)	v	Kuwait; 177 (48.5 overs)
Milan Fernando 59 (106); Hisham Mirza 2/26 (5 overs)		Sibtain Raza 56 (76); Rana-Javed Iqbal 5/25 (10 overs)

Germany won by 11 runs
Botswana Cricket Association Oval 1, Gaborone
Umpires: Rockie D'Mello (Ken) and Steven Douglas (Ber)
Player of the match: Rana-Javed Iqbal (Ger)

- Kuwait won the toss and elected to field

5 May
Scorecard

Nigeria; 220/9 (50 overs)	v	Japan; 130 (38.5 overs)
Segun Olayinka 51 (72); Raheel Kano 4/52 (10 overs)		Munir Ahmed 38 (60); Sean Philips 3/25 (8.5 overs)

Nigeria won by 90 runs
Botswana Cricket Association Oval 2, Gaborone
Umpires: Lalji Bhudia (Ken) and Wynand Louw (Nam)
Player of the match: Segun Olayinka (Ngr)

- Japan won the toss and elected to field

7 May
Scorecard

Botswana; 123 (37.2 overs)	v	Nigeria; 120/2 (25 overs)
Akrum Chand 28 (55); Sean Phillips 3/10 (6.2 overs)		Segun Olayinka 53* (72); Segolame Ramatu 1/7 (2 overs)

Nigeria won by 8 wickets (D/L)
Botswana Cricket Association Oval 1, Gaborone
Umpires: Steven Douglas (Ber) and Patric Makumbi (Uga)
Player of the match: Segun Olayinka (Ngr)

- Nigeria won the toss and elected to field.

7 May
Scorecard

Germany; 184 (46.4 overs)	v	Norway; 122 (25.4 overs)
Srinivas Satyanarayana 52 (47); Waseen Gill 3/29 (8.4 overs)		Shahid Ahmed 26 (35); Ehsan Latif 4/26 (5.4 overs)

Germany won by 18 runs (D/L)
Botswana Cricket Association Oval 2, Gaborone
Umpires: Rudi Koertzen (SA) and Wynand Louw (Nam)
Player of the match: Ehsan Latif (Ger)

- Norway won the toss and elected to field.

7 May
Scorecard

Japan	v	Kuwait

Match abandoned without a ball bowled
Lobatse Cricket Ground
Umpires: Rockie D'Mello (Ken) and David Odhiambo (Ken)

=== Playoffs ===
==== 5th place playoff ====
8 May
Scorecard

Norway; 225 (48 overs)	v	Japan; 169/9 (50 overs)
Gulfam Butt 49 (68); Takuro Hagihara 3/35 (8 overs)		Patrick Giles-Jones 68* (69); Shahid Ahmed 3/27 (8 overs)

Norway won by 56 runs
Lobatse Cricket Ground
Umpires: Lalji Bhudia (Ken) and Rockie D'Mello (Ken)
Player of the match: Patrick Giles-Jones (Jpn)

- Japan won the toss and elected to field.

==== 3rd place playoff ====
8 May
Scorecard

Germany; 269/5 (50 overs)	v	Botswana; 244 (48.2 overs)
Asif Khan 100 (101); James Moses 2/63 (10 overs)		Noor Ahmad 74 (101); Rajeev Vohra 3/48 (8.2 overs)

Germany won by 25 runs
Botswana Cricket Association Oval 2, Gaborone
Umpires: Patric Makumbi (Uga) and David Odhiambo
Player of the match: Asif Khan (Ger)

- Germany won the toss and elected to bat.

==== Final ====
8 May
Scorecard

Kuwait; 219/9 (50 overs)	v	Nigeria; 147 (36.5 overs)
Irfan Bhatti 60 (77); Olajide Bejide 4/20 (6 overs)		Ramit Gill 45 (67); Mohammad Murad 4/20 (8.5 overs)

Kuwait won by 72 runs
Botswana Cricket Association Oval 1, Gaborone
Umpires: Steven Douglas (Ber) and Wynand Louw (Nam)
Player of the match: Mohammad Murad (Kuw)

- Nigeria won the toss and elected to field.

== Statistics ==
=== Most runs ===
The top five highest run scorers (total runs) are included in this table.

Player	Team	Runs	Inns	Avg	S/R	HS	100s	50s
Faisal Rana	Botswana	230	6	46.00	89.84	158*	1	0
Sean Philips	Nigeria	229	5	76.33	71.11	75	0	2
Asif Khan	Germany	220	5	55.00	72.36	100	1	1
Muhammad Butt	Norway	219	6	43.80	73.48	98	0	2
Irfan Bhatti	Kuwait	207	5	51.75	85.89	83*	0	3

=== Most wickets ===
The following table contains the five leading wicket-takers.

Player	Team	Wkts	Mts	Ave	S/R	Econ	BBI
Rana-Javed Iqbal	Germany	18	6	9.77	17.8	3.27	6/25
Mohammad Murad	Kuwait	15	5	10.26	17.7	3.47	6/39
Saad Khalid	Kuwait	11	5	11.63	18.9	3.69	5/24
Omar Ali	Botswana	10	5	18.80	20.8	5.42	3/42
Ehsan Latif	Germany	9	5	16.88	24.8	4.07	4/26

== Final Placings ==
After the conclusion of the tournament the teams were distributed as follows:

Pos	Team	Status
1st	Kuwait	Promoted to Division Six for 2011
2nd	Nigeria	Promoted to Division Six for 2011
3rd	Germany	Remain in Division Seven for 2013
4th	Botswana	Remain in Division Seven for 2013
5th	Norway	Relegated to Division Eight for 2012
6th	Japan	Relegated to Division Eight for 2012
