= World Cricket League Division Eight =

WCL Division Eight
- Administrator: ICC
- Format: 50 overs
- First edition: 2010
- Latest edition: 2012
- Tournament format: Round robin, playoffs
- Number of teams: 8
- Current champion: Vanuatu
- Most successful: Kuwait; Vanuatu

ICC World Cricket League Division Eight was the lowest division of the World Cricket League (WCL) system for its 2009–14 and 2012–18 cycles. Like all other divisions, WCL Division Eight was contested as a standalone tournament rather than as an actual league.

The inaugural Division Eight tournament was held in 2010, hosted and won by Kuwait. The 2012 tournament was hosted by Samoa and won by Vanuatu. The 2010 and 2012 were the only editions to be held before the WCL was downsized to five divisions, with both featuring eight teams who qualified via regional events. Vanuatu, Bhutan, and Suriname were the only teams to participate in both tournaments. Vanuatu is the only team to progress from Division Eight to Division Five.

== Results ==
Year	Host(s)	Venue(s)	Final		
Year	Host(s)	Venue(s)	Winner	Result	Runner-up
2010	Kuwait	Ahmadi City; Kuwait City	Kuwait; 164/4 (33.1 overs)	Kuwait won by 6 wickets scorecard	Germany; 163/8 (50 overs)
2012	Samoa	Apia	Vanuatu; 222/9 (50 overs)	Vanuatu won by 39 runs scorecard	Ghana; 183 (42.5 overs)

== Performance by team ==
Legend

- 1st – Champions
- 2nd – Runners-up
- 3rd – Third place
- Q – Qualified
- — Hosts

Team	(Kuwait) 2010	(Samoa) 2012	Total
Bahamas	8th	—	1
Belgium	—	4th	1
Bhutan	7th	8th	2
Germany	2nd	—	1
Ghana	—	2nd	1
Gibraltar	6th	—	1
Japan	—	3rd	1
Kuwait	1st	—	1
Norway	—	5th	1
Samoa	—	6th	1
Suriname	5th	7th	2
Vanuatu	3rd	1st	2
Zambia	4th	—	1

- Note: the teams placing first and second at each tournament were promoted to Division Seven, while all other teams were relegated to regional qualifiers.

== Player statistics ==
Year	Most runs	Most wickets	Ref
2010	(Vanuatu) Andrew Mansale (288)	(Germany) Kashif Haider (17)	
2012	(Japan) Alexander Patmore (237)	(Vanuatu) Patrick Matautaava (14)	
