= 2012 ICC World Cricket League Division Eight =

- Administrator: International Cricket Council
- Cricket format: Limited overs cricket
- Tournament format(s): Round-robin and Knockout
- Host: Samoa
- Champions: Vanuatu (1st title)
- Participants: 8
- Matches: 20
- Player of the series: Nalin Nipiko (Van)
- Most runs: Alexander Patmore (Jap)
- Most wickets: Patrick Matautaava (Van)

The 2012 ICC World Cricket League Division Eight was a cricket tournament which took place on 15–22 September 2012 in Samoa. It formed part of the World Cricket League and 2019 Cricket World Cup qualifying.

== Teams ==
The teams that took part in the tournament were decided according to the results of the 2010 ICC World Cricket League Division Eight, the 2011 ICC World Cricket League Division Seven and regional tournaments.

Teams that qualified automatically were:

- Norway (5th in 2011 ICC World Cricket League Division Seven)
- Japan (6th in 2011 ICC World Cricket League Division Seven)
- Vanuatu (3rd in 2010 ICC World Cricket League Division Eight)

The remaining five teams were determined by the ICC Development Committee based on the most recent regional results and other factors.

- Samoa
- Bhutan
- Ghana
- Suriname
- Belgium

Europe's qualifier was determined in a four-team tournament held in June in La Manga, Spain, between Austria, Belgium, France and Gibraltar.

== Groups and squads ==
Group A

Ghana	Norway	Samoa	Vanuatu
Peter Ananya (C); Isaac Aboagye; Moses Anafie; Kind-David Ankrah; Lawrence Ateak; Vincent Ateak; Samson Awiah; Kofi Bagabena; Francis Bakiweyem; Mark Bawa (wk); Matthew Bawa; Obed Harvey; Julius Mensah (wk); James Vifah	Muhammad Butt (C); Babar Shahzad (vc); Waheed Aamir; Shahid Ahmed; Waqas Ahmed; Tafseer Ali; Waseem Gill; Ehtsam ul Haq (wk); Safir Hayat; Shahid Mahmood; Usman Sahi (wk); Ali Saleem; Zeeshan Siddiqui; Wasim Tahir	Benjamin Mailata (C); Geoff Clarke (vc) (wk); Tiafala Alatasi; Daniel Burgess; Sean Cotter; Loutala Fuinaomo; Taitoe Kaisala (wk); Winston Mariner; Faasao Mulivai; Pritchard Pritchard; Murphy Su'a; Naa Vaasili; Sipiliano Tua; Ian West	Andrew Mansale (C); Jonathon Dunn (vc); Michael Avok; Jelany Chilia; Aby John; Worford Kalworai; Trevor Langa (wk); Patrick Matautaava; Lenica Natapei; Nalin Nipiko; Simpson Obed; Damian Smith; Kenny Tari; Niko Unavalu

Group B

Belgium	Bhutan	Japan	Suriname
Andre Wagener (C); Jamie Farmiloe; Aamir Iqbal; Faisal Khaliq; Mahesh Krishnamoorthy; Shaival Mehta; Shahid Muhammad; Simon Newport; Ali Raza (wk); Abdul Rehman; Waqas Shafiq; Nirvam Shah; Sunny Sheikh; Eddie Wright	Jigme Singye (C); Tshering Dorji (vc) (wk); Manoj Adhikari (wk); Dampo Dorji; Nima Gurung; Sanjeevan Gurung; Bikash Luitel; Suprit Pradhan; Dilip Subba; Kumar Subba; Sonam Tobgay; Barun Wakhley; Phuntsho Wangdi; Lobzang Yonten	Tatsuro Chino (C) (wk); Takuro Hagihara; Hanif Khan Muhammad; Masaomi Kobayashi; Daniel Mee; Naoki Miyaji; Naotsune Miyaji; Satoshi Nakano; Kazuyuki Ogawa; Tomoki Ota; Alexander Patmore; Jarrad Shearer; Makoto Taniyama; Fumihiko Uegaki	Shazam Ramjohn (C); Carlton Baker; Mohindra Boodram; Yuvraj Dayal; Charles Douglas; Troy Dudnath; Arun Gokoel; Troy Haley; Kemraj Hardat (wk); Raief Hasrat; Radjeev Jagroep; Terbhawan Ranjit; Vishwar Shaw; Vishaul Singh

== Fixtures ==
=== Group stage ===
==== Group A ====
Team	P	W	L	T	NR	Points	NRR	Status
Vanuatu	3	3	0	0	0	6	+0.781	Advanced to the semifinals
Ghana	3	2	1	0	0	4	+0.495	Advanced to the semifinals
Samoa	3	1	2	0	0	2	-0.063	Parachuted to the Playoffs and automatically relegated to regional competitions
Norway	3	0	3	0	0	0	-1.202	Parachuted to the Playoffs and automatically relegated to regional competitions

==== Matches ====
15 September
Scorecard

Ghana; 206 (48.3 overs)	v	Samoa; 156 (38.2 overs)
Francis Bakiweyem 52 (61); Sipiliano Tua 3/22 (6 overs)		Benjamin Mailata 61 (69); Kofi Bagabena 4/38 (8 overs)

Ghana won by 50 runs
Faleata Oval No 3, Apia
Umpires: Gary Baxter (NZ) and Clive Elly (PNG)
Player of the match: Kofi Bagabena (Gha)

- Samoa won the toss and elected to field.

15 September
Scorecard

Vanuatu; 173 (41.2 overs)	v	Norway; 95 (38.1 overs)
Lenica Natapei 60 (61); Muhammad Butt 4/27 (10 overs)		Ali Saleem 28 (54); Patrick Matautaava 6/10 (9.1 overs)

Vanuatu won by 78 runs
Faleata Oval No 4, Apia
Umpires: Lakani Oala (PNG) and Shahul Hameed (Ina)
Player of the match: Patrick Matautaava (Van)

- Vanuatu won the toss and elected to bat.

17 September
Scorecard

Ghana; 197 (44.2 overs)	v	Vanuatu; 198/5 (42.1 overs)
Obed Harvey 51* (100); Patrick Matautaava 3/23 (9 overs)		Nalin Nipiko 58* (46); Kofi Bagabena 2/18 (3.1 overs)

Vanuatu won by 5 wickets (D/L)
Faleata Oval No 1, Apia
Umpires: Gary Baxter (NZ) and Neil Harrison (Jap)
Player of the match: Andrew Mansale (Van)

- Ghana won the toss and elected to bat.
- Rain stopped the Ghana innings after 9.2 overs, thus setting Vanuatu a target of 198 in 45 overs

17 September
Scorecard

Norway; 188 (42.5 overs)	v	Samoa; 190/5 (30.4 overs)
Zeeshan Siddiqui 57 (104); Benjamin Mailata 4/15 (3.5 overs)		Benjamin Mailata 79* (76); Babar Shahzad 2/37 (6 overs)

Samoa won by 5 wickets (D/L)
Faleata Oval No 2, Apia
Umpires: Farid Dalwai (Kuw) and Mosur Ramesh (Sin)
Player of the match: Benjamin Mailata (Sam)

- Norway won the toss and elected to bat.
- Rain stopped the Norway innings after 11.5 overs, thus setting Samoa a target of 186 in 45 overs

19 September
Scorecard

Vanuatu; 193 (49.4 overs)	v	Samoa; 172 (38.1 overs)
Trevor Langa 36* (36); Benjamin Mailata 4/21 (4.4 overs)		Faasao Mulivai 33 (17); Nalin Nipiko 3/17 (6.1 overs)

Vanuatu won by 21 runs
Faleata Oval No 3, Apia
Umpires: Gary Baxter (NZ) and Farid Dalwai (Kuw)
Player of the match: Nalin Nipiko (Van)

- Samoa won the toss and elected to field.

19 September
Scorecard

Ghana; 159 (39.3 overs)	v	Norway; 125 (42.4 overs)
Samson Awiah 50 (76); Zeeshan Siddiqui 2/20 (6 overs)		Zeeshan Siddiqui 27 (77); Obed Harvey 3/24 (9 overs)

Ghana won by 34 runs
Faleata Oval No 4, Apia
Umpires: Clive Elly (PNG) and Mosur Ramesh (Sin)
Player of the match: Samson Awiah (Gha)

- Ghana won the toss and elected to bat.

==== Group B ====
Team	P	W	L	T	NR	Points	NRR	Status
Japan	3	3	0	0	0	6	+2.007	Advanced to the semifinals
Belgium	3	2	1	0	0	4	+1.339	Advanced to the semifinals
Suriname	3	1	2	0	0	2	-1.951	Parachuted to the Playoffs and automatically relegated to regional competitions
Bhutan	3	0	3	0	0	0	-1.335	Parachuted to the Playoffs and automatically relegated to regional competitions

==== Matches ====
15 September
Scorecard

Bhutan; 79 (35.4 overs)	v	Belgium; 81/1 (25.1 overs)
Sonam Tobgay 17 (26); Aamir Iqbal 3/4 (6 overs)		Nirvam Shah 34* (60); Jigme Singye 1/23 (6.1 overs)

Belgium won by 9 wickets
Faleata Oval No 1, Apia
Umpires: Neil Harrison (Jap) and Mosur Ramesh (Sin)
Player of the match: Shahid Muhammad (Bel)

- Bhutan won the toss and elected to bat.

15 September
Scorecard

Japan; 229/8 (50 overs)	v	Suriname; 87 (36.2 overs)
Jarrad Shearer 59 (101); Vishaul Singh 4/50 (10 overs)		Vishaul Singh 35 (76); Satoshi Nakano 5/27 (10 overs)

Japan won by 142 runs
Faleata Oval No 2, Apia
Umpires: Geoff Clelland (Van) and Nigel Morrison (Van)
Player of the match: Satoshi Nakano (Jap)

- Suriname won the toss and elected to field.

17 September
Scorecard

Japan; 203/8 (42 overs)	v	Bhutan; 144 (36.1 overs)
Alexander Patmore 91 (109); Lobzang Yongteng 3/36 (9 overs)		Jigme Singye 51 (86); Takuro Hagihara 2/23 (6.1 overs)

Japan won by 60 runs (D/L)
Faleata Oval No 3, Apia
Umpires: Geoff Clelland (Van) and Lakani Oala (PNG)
Player of the match: Alex Patmore (Jap)

- Japan won the toss and elected to bat.
- Rain stopped the Japan innings after 7.4 overs, thus setting Bhutan a target of 205 in 42 overs

17 September
Scorecard

Belgium; 283/7 (42 overs)	v	Suriname; 115 (30.4 overs)
Abdul Rehman 81 (34); Shazam Ramjohn 3/56 (6 overs)		Mohindra Boodram 47 (64); Faisal Khaliq 2/10 (5 overs)

Belgium won by 170 runs (D/L)
Faleata Oval No 4, Apia
Umpires: Clive Elly (PNG) and Shahul Hameed (Ina)
Player of the match: Abdul Rehman (Bel)

- Belgium won the toss and elected to bat.
- Rain stopped the Belgium innings after 9 overs, thus setting Suriname a target of 286 in 42 overs

19 September
Scorecard

Suriname; 152(48.3 overs)	v	Bhutan; 117 (45.1 overs)
Carlton Baker 46 (82); Lobzang Yonten 4/27 (10 overs)		Dampo Dorji 18 (18); Yuvraj Dayal 2/7 (3 overs)

Suriname won by 35 runs
Faleata Oval No 1, Apia
Umpires: Geoff Clelland (Van) and Neil Harrison (Jap)
Player of the match: Carlton Baker (Sur)

- Suriname won the toss and elected to bat.

19 September
Scorecard

Japan; 194/9 (50 overs)	v	Belgium; 111 (35 overs)
Daniel Mee 59 (91); Shaival Mehta 3/43 (10 overs)		Jamie Farmiloe 32 (41); Naoki Miyaji 3/19 (8 overs)

Japan won by 83 runs
Faleata Oval No 2, Apia
Umpires: Nigel Morrison (Van) and Lakani Oala (PNG)
Player of the match: Daniel Mee (Jap)

- Japan won the toss and elected to bat.

== Plate ==
=== 5th place semifinals ===
20 September
Scorecard

Bhutan; 129 (46.4 overs)	v	Samoa; 130/4 (25.1 overs)
Sonam Tobgay 31 (46); Naa Vaasili 3/27 (10 overs)		Taitoe Kaisala 49 (44); Dilip Subba 2/36 (10 overs)

Samoa won by 6 wickets
Faleata Oval No 3, Apia
Umpires: Gary Baxter (NZ) and Farid Dalwai (Kuw)
Player of the match: Taitoe Kaisala (Sam)

- Bhutan won the toss and elected to bat

20 September
Scorecard

Suriname; 235/6 (50 overs)	v	Norway; 238/6 (47.4 overs)
Mohindra Boodram 103* (104); Zeeshan Siddiqui 1/25 (7 overs)		Muhammad Butt 77 (73); Vishwar Shaw 2/16 (3 overs)

Norway won by 4 wickets
Faleata Oval No 4, Apia
Umpires: Geoff Clelland (Van) and Clive Elly (PNG)
Player of the match: Mohindra Boodram (Sur)

- Suriname won the toss and elected to bat.

=== 7th Place Playoff ===
22 September
(scorecard)

Suriname; 206 (48.2 overs)	v	Bhutan; 203 (48.1 overs)
Troy Dudnath 54 (55); Lobzang Yonten 3/27 (9 overs)		Suprit Pradhan 82 (104); Carlton Baker 4/34 (10 overs)

Suriname won by 3 runs
Faleata Oval No 4, Apia
Umpires: Farid Dalwai (Kuw) and Lakani Oala (PNG)
Player of the match: Shazam Ramjohn (Sur)

- Suriname won the toss and elected to bat.

=== 5th Place Playoff ===
22 September
(scorecard)

Norway; 271/7 (50 overs)	v	Samoa; 137 (38 overs)
Ali Saleem 89 (88); Tiafala Alatasi 3/51 (8 overs)		Benjamin Mailata 30 (49); Tafseer Ali 5/30 (9 overs)

Norway won by 134 runs
Faleata Oval No 3, Apia
Umpires: Clive Elly (PNG) and Nigel Morrison (Van)
Player of the match: Tafseer Ali (Nor)

- Samoa won the toss and elected to field.

== Semifinals and Final ==
=== Semifinals ===
20 September
Scorecard

Vanuatu; 227/9 (50 overs)	v	Belgium; 144 all out (44.1 overs)
Patrick Matautaava 48 (48); Andre Wagener 4/66 (10 overs)		Aamir Iqbal 34 (52); Jelany Chilia 2/12 (10 overs)

Vanuatu won by 83 runs
Faleata Oval No 1, Apia
Umpires: Neil Harrison (Jap) and Mosur Ramesh (Sin)
Player of the match: Patrick Matautaava (Van)

- Vanuatu won the toss and elected to bat

20 September
Scorecard

Ghana; 198 (48.1 overs)	v	Japan; 136 (46.2 overs)
Samson Awiah 28 (64); Daniel Mee 3/21 (6 overs)		Tatsuro Chino 24 (69); Kofi Bagabena 2/25 (9 overs)

Ghana won by 62 runs
Faleata Oval No 2, Apia
Umpires: Nigel Morrison (Van) and Shahul Hameed (Ina)
Player of the match: Isaac Aboagye (Gha)

- Ghana won the toss and elected to bat.

=== 3rd Place Playoff ===
22 September
(scorecard)

Japan; 180 (47.5 overs)	v	Belgium; 170 (47.2 overs)
Alexander Patmore 101 (155); Faisal Khaliq 5/20 (8.5 overs)		Shaival Mehta 27* (33); Makoto Taniyama 5/55 (10 overs)

Japan won by 10 runs
Faleata Oval No 2, Apia
Umpires: Geoff Clelland (Van) and Mosur Ramesh (Sin)
Player of the match: Alexander Patmore (Jap)

- Japan won the toss and elected to bat.

== Final ==
22 September
(scorecard)

Vanuatu; 222/9 (50 overs)	v	Ghana; 183 (42.5 overs)
Jonathon Dunn 78 (139); Isaac Aboagye 4/39 (10 overs)		Obed Harvey 33 (35); Simpson Obed 3/17 (4 overs)

Vanuatu won by 39 runs
Faleata Oval No 1, Apia
Umpires: Neil Harrison (Jap) and Shahul Hameed (Ina)
Player of the match: Jonathon Dunn (Van)

- Vanuatu won the toss and elected to bat first.

== Statistics ==
=== Most runs ===
The top five run scorers (total runs) are included in this table.

Player	Team	Runs	Inns	Avg	S/R	HS	100s	50s
Alexander Patmore	Japan	237	5	47.40	66.20	101	1	1
Nalin Nipiko	Vanuatu	213	5	53.25	77.17	59	0	2
Benjamin Mailata	Samoa	200	5	50.00	86.58	79*	0	2
Mohindra Boodram	Suriname	189	5	47.25	73.82	103*	1	0
Samson Awiah	Ghana	147	5	29.40	57.19	50	0	1

=== Most wickets ===
The top five wicket takers (total wickets) are listed in this table.

Player	Team	Wkts	Mts	Ave	S/R	Econ	BBI
Patrick Matautaava	Vanuatu	14	5	8.71	18.5	2.82	6/10
Faisal Khaliq	Belgium	11	4	7.18	17.7	2.43	5/20
Abdul Rehman	Belgium	11	5	12.09	19.0	3.80	3/32
Kofi Bagabena	Ghana	11	5	12.81	19.6	3.91	4/38
Lobzang Yonten	Bhutan	10	5	11.70	21.0	3.34	4/27

== Final Placings ==
After the conclusion of the tournament the teams were distributed as follows:

Pos	Team	Status
1st	Vanuatu	Promoted to Division Seven for 2013
2nd	Ghana	Promoted to Division Seven for 2013
3rd	Japan	Relegated to regional competitions
4th	Belgium	Relegated to regional competitions
5th	Norway	Relegated to regional competitions
6th	Samoa	Relegated to regional competitions
7th	Suriname	Relegated to regional competitions
8th	Bhutan	Relegated to regional competitions
