= 2012–2018 World Cricket League =

International cricket tournament

2012–18 ICC World Cricket League
- Administrator(s): International Cricket Council
- Cricket format: One Day International; List A
- Tournament format(s): League system
- Host(s): Various

A series of ICC World Cricket League tournaments and the 2018 Cricket World Cup Qualifier were played between 2012 and 2018 and formed part of the Cricket World Cup qualification process for the 2019 Cricket World Cup. It was the third time the World Cricket League was used for World Cup qualification. At the conclusion of the previous cycle, the competition was composed of eight divisions but in 2014, ICC reduced Division 7 and Division 8. In addition, a series of qualifying regional tournaments were played.

== Background ==
On 28 January 2015, the ICC announced that the leading two associate sides, Ireland and Afghanistan, would be promoted to the ICC ODI Championship for the period until the 2019 World Cup. This promotion guaranteed both associate sides entry to the final Cricket World Cup qualifier, and an opportunity to qualify directly through the ODI championship.

As a consequence, both teams were removed from the World Cricket League one-day programme, and Kenya and Nepal, who had missed out on promotion to World Cricket League Championship days before, were promoted to the Championship.

== List of tournaments ==
| Details | Dates | Host nation(s) | Final | | | |
| Details | Dates | Host nation(s) | Venue | Winner | Result | Runner-up |
|---|---|---|---|---|---|---|
| 2012; Division Eight | 17–23 September 2012 | Samoa | Faleata Oval No 1, Apia | Vanuatu; 222/9 (50 overs) | Vanuatu won by 39 runs Scorecard | Ghana; 183 (42.5 overs) |
| 2013; Division Seven | 6-13 April 2013 | Botswana | Botswana Cricket Association Oval 1, Gaborone | Nigeria; 134/4 (32.1 overs) | Nigeria won by 6 wickets Scorecard | Vanuatu; 133 (38.4 overs) |
| 2013; Division Six | 21–28 July 2013 | Jersey | N/A | Jersey; 10 points | Jersey topped points table | Nigeria; 8 points |
| 2014; Division Five | 6–13 March 2014 | Malaysia | Kinrara Academy Oval, Kuala Lumpur | Jersey; 247/8 (50 overs) | Jersey won by 71 runs Scorecard | Malaysia; 176 (44.4 overs) |
| 2014; Division Four | 21–28 June 2014 | Singapore | Kallang, Singapore | Malaysia; 235/7 (50 overs) | Malaysia won by 57 runs Scorecard | Singapore; 178 (46.1 overs) |
| 2014; Division Three | 23–30 October 2014 | Malaysia | Kinrara Academy Oval, Kuala Lumpur | Nepal; 223 (49.5 overs) | Nepal won by 62 runs Scorecard | Uganda; 161 (44.1 overs) |
| 2015; Division Two | 17–25 January 2015 | Namibia | Wanderers Cricket Ground, Windhoek | Netherlands; 213-2 (41 overs) | Netherlands won by 8 wickets Scorecard | Namibia; 212 (49.2 overs) |
| 2015; Division Six | 7–13 September 2015 | England | County Cricket Ground, Chelmsford | Suriname; 239/4 (45.1 overs) | Suriname won by 6 wickets Scorecard | Guernsey; 237 (49.5 overs) |
| 2016; Division Five | 21–28 May 2016 | Jersey | Grainville Cricket Ground, Saint Saviour | Jersey; 194/7 (50 overs) | Jersey won by 44 runs Scorecard | Oman; 150 (45.3 overs) |
| 2016; Division Four | 29 October – 5 November 2016 | United States | Leo Magnus Cricket Complex, Los Angeles | United States; 208 (49.4 overs) | United States won by 13 runs Scorecard | Oman; 195/9 (50 overs) |
| 2017; Division Three | 23–30 May 2017 | Uganda | Lugogo Stadium, Kampala | Oman; 50/2 (4.3 overs) | No result (Oman topped points table); Scorecard | Canada; 176/3 (38 overs) |
| 2015-17; Championship | 15 May 2015 – 8 December 2017 | Various | N/A | Netherlands; 22 points | Points Table | Scotland; 19 points |
| 2018; Division Two | 8–15 February 2018 | Namibia | Wanderers Cricket Ground, Windhoek | United Arab Emirates; 277/4 (50 overs) | United Arab Emirates won by 7 runs Scorecard | Nepal; 270/8 (50 overs) |
| 2018; WC Qualifier | 4–25 March 2018 | Zimbabwe | Harare Sports Club, Harare | Afghanistan; 206/3 (40.4 overs) | Afghanistan won by 7 wickets Scorecard | West Indies; 204 (46.5 overs) |

== Tournament results ==
| Team | Division at start | 2012 | 2013 | | 2014 | | | 2015 | | 2016 | | 2017 | | 2018 | | Division at end |
| Team | Division at start | Div 8 | Div 7 | Div 6 | Div 5 | Div 4 | Div 3 | Div 2 | Div 6 | Div 5 | Div 4 | Div 3 | C'ship | Div 2 | WCQ | Division at end |
|---|---|---|---|---|---|---|---|---|---|---|---|---|---|---|---|---|
| Hong Kong | C | | | | | | | | | | | | 3 | | 10 ▼ | 2 |
| Papua New Guinea | C | | | | | | | | | | | | 4 | | 9 ▼ | 2 |
| Scotland | C | | | | | | | | | | | | 2 | | 4 | C |
| United Arab Emirates | C | | | | | | | | | | | | 6 ▼ | 1 ▲ | 6 | C |
| Kenya | 2 | | | | | | | 3 ▲ | | | | | 5 ▼ | 6 ▼ | | 3 |
| Namibia | 2 | | | | | | | 2 ▲† | | | | | 8 ▼ | 4 | | 2 |
| Nepal | 3 | | | | | | 1 ▲ | 4 ▲ | | | | | 7 ▼ | 2 ▲ | 8 | C |
| Netherlands | 2 | | | | | | | 1 ▲† | | | | | 1 (Note: When the World Cricket League was replaced with a three-league system in 2019, the Netherlands were assigned to the top-tier Super League by virtue of winning the 2015–17 ICC World Cricket League Championship.) | | 7 | C |
| Argentina | 6 | | | 4 | | | | | | | | | | | | R |
| Bahrain | 6 | | | 5 ▼ | | | | | | | | | | | | R |
| Belgium | R | 4 ▼ | | | | | | | | | | | | | | R |
| Bermuda | 3 | | | | | | 6 ▼ | | | | 4 | | | | | 4 |
| Bhutan | R | 8 ▼ | | | | | | | | | | | | | | R |
| Botswana | 7 | | 3 | | | | | | 6 ▼ | | | | | | | R |
| Canada | 2 | | | | | | | 6 ▼ | | | | 2 ▲ | | 3 | | 2 |
| Cayman Islands | 5 | | | | 6 ▼ | | | | 7 ▼ | | | | | | | R |
| Denmark | 4 | | | | | 3 | | | | | 3 | | | | | 4 |
| Fiji | 7 | | 4 | | | | | | 5 ▼ | | | | | | | R |
| Germany | 7 | | 6 ▼ | | | | | | | | | | | | | R |
| Ghana | R | 2 ▲ | 5 ▼ | | | | | | | | | | | | | R |
| Guernsey | 5 | | | | 5 ▼ | | | | 2 ▲ | 3 | | | | | | 5 |
| Italy | 4 | | | | | 4 | | | | | 6 ▼ | | | | | 5 |
| Japan | 8 | 3 | | | | | | | | | | | | | | R |
| Jersey | 6 | | | 1 ▲ | 1 ▲ | 6 ▼ | | | | 1 ▲ | 5 ▼ | | | | | 5 |
| Kuwait | 6 | | | 6 ▼ | | | | | | | | | | | | R |
| Malaysia | 5 | | | | 2 ▲ | 1 ▲ | 3 | | | | | 6 ▼ | | | | 4 |
| Nigeria | 7 | | 1 ▲ | 2 ▲ | 4 | | | | | 6 ▼ | | | | | | R |
| Norway | 8 | 5 ▼ | | | | | | | 4 ▼ | | | | | | | R |
| Oman | 4 | | | | | 5 ▼ | | | | 2 ▲ | 2 ▲ | 1 ▲ | | 5 ▼ | | 3 |
| Samoa | R | 6 ▼ | | | | | | | | | | | | | | R |
| Saudi Arabia | R | | | | | | | | 8 ▼ (Note: Saudi Arabia failed to complete their matches due to problems obtaining visas.) | | | | | | | R |
| Singapore | 4 | | | | | 2 ▲ | 4 | | | | | 3 | | | | 3 |
| Suriname | R | 7 ▼ | | | | | | | 1 ▲ | (Note: Suriname qualified for but withdrew from the Division Five tournament due to an ICC investigation about the eligibility of some of their players. Vanuatu was their replacement.) | | | | | | R |
| Tanzania | 5 | | | | 3 | | | | | 5 ▼ | | | | | | R |
| Uganda | 3 | | | | | | 2 ▲ | 5 ▼ | | | | 5 ▼ | | | | 4 |
| United States | 3 | | | | | | 5 ▼ | | | | 1 ▲ | 4 | | | | 3 |
| Vanuatu | 8 | 1 ▲ | 2 ▲ | 3 | | | | | 3 | 4 ▼ | | | | | | R |

Key
| | Team with ODI status |
| C | Team played in the ICC World Cricket League Championship |
| ▲ | Team promoted to higher division |
| Same position | Team remained in the same division |
| ▼ | Team relegated to a lower division |
| R | Team played in a regional tournament |
| † | Team qualified for the 2015–17 ICC Intercontinental Cup |
