= World Cricket League Division Six =

WCL Division Six
- Administrator: ICC
- Format: 50 overs
- First edition: 2009
- Tournament format: Round robin, playoffs
- Number of teams: 6 (2009–2013); 8 (2015)
- Current champion: Suriname
- Most successful: Guernsey; Jersey; Singapore; Suriname

ICC World Cricket League Division Six was part of the World Cricket League (WCL) system, but was abolished after the 2015 tournament. Like all other divisions, it was contested as a standalone tournament rather than as an actual league.

The inaugural Division Six tournament was held in 2009, hosted by Singapore, and featured six teams. The next two tournaments (in 2011 and 2013) featured the same number, which was increased to eight for the 2015 tournament. Because the WCL operates on a system of promotion and relegation, teams have generally only participated in one or two Division Six tournaments before being either promoted to Division Five, relegated to Division Seven (2009 and 2011), or relegated to regional competitions (2013 and 2015). Overall, 15 teams have played in at least one Division Six tournament, with Guernsey featuring three times (more than any other team). Malaysia and Singapore, which began in Division Six in 2009, have since progressed to Division Three.

== Results ==
Year	Host(s)	Venue(s)	Final		
Year	Host(s)	Venue(s)	Winner	Result	Runner-up
2009	Singapore	Singapore	Singapore; 242/8 (50 overs)	Singapore won by 68 runs scorecard	Bahrain; 174 (48.4 overs)
2011	Malaysia	Kuala Lumpur	Guernsey; 211/8 (49.3 overs)	Guernsey won by 2 wickets scorecard	Malaysia; 208/9 (50 overs)
2013	Jersey	various	Jersey; 10 points	Jersey won on points table	Nigeria; 8 points
2015	England	Essex	Suriname; 239/4 (45.1 overs)	Suriname won by 6 wickets scorecard	Guernsey; 237 (49.5 overs)

== Performance by team ==
Legend

- 1st – Champions
- 2nd – Runners-up
- 3rd – Third place
- Q – Qualified
- — Hosts

Team	(Singapore) 2009	(Malaysia) 2011	(Jersey) 2013	(England) 2015	Total
Argentina	—	—	4th	—	1
Bahrain	2nd	—	5th	—	2
Botswana	5th	—	—	6th	2
Cayman Islands	—	—	—	7th	1
Fiji	—	6th	—	5th	2
Guernsey	3rd	1st	—	2nd	3
Jersey	—	4th	1st	—	2
Kuwait	—	3rd	6th	—	2
Malaysia	4th	2nd	—	—	2
Nigeria	—	5th	2nd	—	2
Norway	6th	—	—	4th	2
Saudi Arabia	—	—	—	8th	1
Singapore	1st	—	—	—	1
Suriname	—	—	—	1st	1
Vanuatu	—	—	3rd	3rd	2

- Note: at every edition of the tournament, the teams finishing first and second have been promoted to Division Five.

== Player statistics ==
Year	Most runs	Most wickets	Ref
2009	(Guernsey) Jeremy Frith (374)	(Singapore) Mulewa Dharmichand (14)	
2011	(Guernsey) Jeremy Frith (258)	(Jersey) Ben Stevens (15)	
2013	(Jersey) Peter Gough (247)	(Nigeria) Oluseye Olympio (18)	
2015	(Guernsey) Matthew Stokes (241)	(Suriname) Muneshwar Patandin (17)	
