= World Cricket League Division Five =

WCL Division Five
- Administrator: ICC
- Format: 50 overs
- First edition: 2008
- Tournament format: Round robin, playoffs
- Number of teams: 12 (2008); 6 (2010–2016); 8 (2017–)
- Current champion: Jersey
- Most successful: Jersey (3 titles)

ICC World Cricket League Division Five is the lowest current division in the World Cricket League (WCL) system. Like all other divisions, Division Five is contested as a standalone tournament rather than as an actual league.

The inaugural Division Five tournament was held in 2008, hosted by Jersey, and featured 12 teams. For the next four tournaments (2010, 2012, 2014, and 2016), the number of teams was fixed at six. The 2017 competition involved eight teams. Because the WCL operates on a system of promotion and relegation, teams have generally only participated in one or two Division Five tournaments before being either promoted to Division Four or relegated to Division Six. Overall, 25 teams have qualified for at least one Division Five tournament. Afghanistan and Nepal have progressed from Division Five to the World Cup Qualifier, the only teams to do so from such a low starting division.

== Results ==
Year	Host(s)	Venue(s)	Final		
Year	Host(s)	Venue(s)	Winner	Result	Runner-up
2008	Jersey	various	Afghanistan; 81/8 (37.4 overs)	Afghanistan won by 2 wickets scorecard	Jersey; 80 (39.5 overs)
2010	Nepal	Kathmandu Valley	Nepal; 175/5 (46.5 overs)	Nepal won by 5 wickets scorecard	United States; 172 (47.2 overs)
2012	Singapore	Singapore	Singapore; 164/1 (26.4 overs)	Singapore won by 9 wickets scorecard	Malaysia; 159 (47 overs)
2014	Malaysia	Kuala Lumpur	Jersey; 247/8 (50 overs)	Jersey won by 71 runs scorecard	Malaysia; 176 (44.4 overs)
2016	Jersey	Saint Saviour	Jersey; 194/7 (50 overs)	Jersey won by 44 runs scorecard	Oman; 150 (45.3 overs)
2017	South Africa	Benoni	Jersey; 255 (48 overs)	Jersey won by 120 runs scorecard	Vanuatu; 135 (36.5 overs)

== Performance by team ==
Legend

- 1st – Champions
- 2nd – Runners-up
- 3rd – Third place
- Q – Qualified
- — Hosts

Team	(Jersey) 2008	(Nepal) 2010	(Singapore) 2012	(Malaysia) 2014	(Jersey) 2016	(South Africa) 2017	Total
Afghanistan	1st	—	—	—	—	—	1
Argentina	—	—	6th	—	—	—	1
Bahamas	11th	—	—	—	—	—	1
Bahrain	—	3rd	5th	—	—	—	2
Botswana	6th	—	—	—	—	—	1
Cayman Islands	—	—	4th	6th	—	8th	3
Fiji	—	6th	—	—	—	—	1
Germany	7th	—	—	—	—	5th	2
Ghana	—	—	—	—	—	7th	1
Guernsey	—	—	3rd	5th	3rd	6th	4
Italy	—	—	—	—	—	4th	1
Japan	10th	—	—	—	—	—	1
Jersey	2nd	5th	—	1st	1st	1st	5
Mozambique	8th	—	—	—	—	—	1
Malaysia	—	—	2nd	2nd	—	—	2
Nepal	3rd	1st	—	—	—	—	2
Nigeria	—	—	—	4th	6th	—	2
Norway	9th	—	—	—	—	—	1
Oman	—	—	—	—	2nd	—	1
Qatar	—	—	—	—	—	3rd	1
Singapore	5th	4th	1st	—	—	—	3
Tanzania	—	—	—	3rd	5th	—	2
United States	4th	2nd	—	—	—	—	2
Vanuatu	12th	—	—	—	4th	2nd	2

- Note: at every edition of the tournament since 2010, the teams finishing first and second have been promoted to Division Four, and the teams finishing fifth and sixth have been relegated to Division Six. In 2008, the teams finishing first and second were promoted as usual, while every team finishing below fifth was relegated to regional tournaments.

== Player statistics ==
Year	Most runs	Most wickets	Ref
2008	(Norway) Shahid Ahmed (349)	(Nepal) Mehboob Alam (19)	
2010	(United States) Steve Massiah (289)	(United States) Kevin Darlington (14)	
2012	(Bahrain) Adil Hanif (265)	(Guernsey) David Hooper (17)	
2014	(Jersey) Ben Stevens (403)	(Malaysia) Khizar Hayat (15)	
2016	(Oman) Zeeshan Maqsood (350)	(Jersey) Ben Kynman (15)	
2017	(Italy) Damian Crowley (308)	(Jersey) Ben Stevens (14) (Guernsey) David Hooper (14)	
