= 2007–2009 World Cricket League =

2007–09 ICC World Cricket League
- Official logo
- Administrator: International Cricket Council
- Cricket format: One Day International; List A
- Tournament format(s): Round-robin and knockout
- Participants: 30 (from 87 nations)
- Most runs: (Guernsey) Jeremy Frith (381)
- Most wickets: (Bahrain) Qamar Saeed (19)

A series of six ICC World Cricket League (WCL) tournaments, as well as a series of pre-qualifying regional tournaments, and the 2009 Cricket World Cup Qualifier were played between January 2007 and April 2009. It was the first use of the World Cricket League structure. Through the WCL tournaments, teams could advance to the World Cup Qualifier, which could lead to qualification for the 2011 Cricket World Cup. 30 Associate and Affiliate members of the ICC participated in the events.

The Afghanistan national cricket team ascended from Division Five to Division One by winning three of these tournaments and performing well in the World Cup Qualifier.

== Structure ==
The league structure was organised with the five global divisions. The regional tournaments were administered by the five Development Regions of the International Cricket Council: Africa, Americas, Asia, East Asia-Pacific, and Europe.

=== Summary ===
The following is the summary of World Cricket League and its structure. This was followed by the International Cricket Council.

World Cricket League tournaments leading to the 2009 Cricket World Cup Qualifier

The above diagram shows the chronological order and structure of the divisions within the World Cricket League. From left to right the chronology of the divisions is indicated; from top to bottom the hierarchy within the competition. The arrows indicate the number of teams promoted and relegated between leagues

== Tournaments summary ==
Details	Dates	Host nation(s)	Final			
Details	Dates	Host nation(s)	Venue	Winner	Result	Runner-up
2007; Division One	29 January – 7 February 2007	Kenya	Nairobi Gymkhana Club, Nairobi	Kenya; 158/2 (37.5 overs)	Kenya won by 8 wickets Scorecard	Scotland; 155 all out (47 overs)
2007; Division Three	27 May – 2 June 2007	Australia	Gardens Oval, Darwin	Uganda; 241/8 (50 overs)	Uganda won by 91 runs scorecard	Argentina; 150 all out (46.3 overs)
2007; Division Two	24 November – 1 December 2007	Namibia	Wanderers Cricket Ground, Windhoek	United Arab Emirates; 347/8 (50 overs)	United Arab Emirates won by 67 runs scorecard	Oman; 280 all out (43.2 overs)
2008; Division Five	23–31 May 2008	Jersey	Grainville, St Saviour	Afghanistan; 81/8 (37.4 overs)	Afghanistan won by 2 wickets Scorecard	Jersey; 80 all out (39.5 overs)
2008; Division Four	4–11 October 2008	Tanzania	Kinondoni Ground, Dar es Salaam	Afghanistan; 179 all out (49.4 overs)	Afghanistan won by 57 runs Scorecard	Hong Kong; 122 all out (45.0 overs)
2009; Division Three	24–31 January 2009	Argentina	Belgrano Athletic Club, Buenos Aires	Afghanistan; 8 points, +0.971(NRR)	Afghanistan topped points table Table	Uganda; 8 points, +0.768(NRR)
2009; WC Qualifier	1–19 April 2009	South Africa	SuperSport Park, Centurion	Ireland; 188/1 (42.3 overs)	Ireland won by 9 wickets Scorecard	Canada; 185 all out (48 overs)

== Teams ==
Team	Division at start	2007			2008		2009		Division at end
Team	Division at start	Div One	Div Three	Div Two (Note: Due to the Asian Cricket Council's decision to handle development of their member nations themselves, both Namibia and Denmark joined the HPP as of 1 April 2007)	Div Five (Note: Japan were relegated to 2009 Global Division Seven. All other teams 7th or lower were distributed into lower divisions.)	Div Four	Div Three	WCQ (Note: 1st to 6th received official One Day International status for the following four years. 1st to 8th qualified for the ICC Intercontinental Cup.)	Division at end
Bermuda	1	6th						9th ▼	2
Canada	1	4th						2nd ‡	1
Ireland	1	5th						1st ‡	1
Kenya	1	1st						4th ‡	1
Netherlands	1	3rd						3rd ‡	1
Scotland	1	2nd						6th	1
Afghanistan	5				1st ▲	1st ▲	1st	5th ▲	1
Argentina (Note: The United States had their membership suspended and were replaced by Argentina in Division Three in 2007. Upon reinstatement, they were assigned to Division Five in 2008.)	5		2nd ▲†	6th ▼			6th ▼		4
Bahamas	5				11th ▼				R
Botswana	5				6th ▼				6
Cayman Islands	3		4th				5th ▼		4
Denmark	2			4th				12th ▼	3
Fiji	3		8th ▼			5th ▼			5
Germany	5				7th ▼				R
Hong Kong	3		5th ▼			2nd ▲	4th		3
Italy	3		7th ▼			3rd			4
Japan	5				10th ▼				7
Jersey	5				2nd ▲	6th ▼			5
Mozambique	5				8th ▼				R
Namibia	2			3rd				8th	2
Nepal	5				3rd				5
Norway	5				9th ▼				6
Oman	2			2nd				11th ▼	3
Papua New Guinea	3		3rd				3rd		3
Singapore	5				5th ▼				6
Tanzania	3		6th ▼			4th			4
Uganda	3		1st ▲†	5th ▼			2nd	10th ▲	2
United Arab Emirates	2			1st				7th	2
United States	3				4th				5
Vanuatu	5				12th ▼				R

	Team with ODI status
	Team qualifies for 2009 ICC World Cup Qualifier
▲	Team promoted to next division
Same position	Team remains in the division
▼	Team relegated to a lower division
R	Regional tournament
†	Qualified for the High Performance Program (HPP)
‡	Qualified for the 2011 Cricket World Cup
