= 2017–2019 World Cricket League =

International cricket league

2017–2019 ICC World Cricket League
- Administrator: International Cricket Council
- Cricket format: One Day International; List A
- Tournament format: League system
- Host: Various

A series of ICC World Cricket League tournaments were played from September 2017 to April 2019 and were the last tournaments of the World Cricket League. There were four divisions, numbered two to five. The divisions were played in roughly consecutive order, with the lower divisions played first. The top two from each division will gain promotion to the following, higher division, meaning that some teams will play in more than one division during the tournament.

Following the conclusion of these tournaments, the World Cricket League was replaced by the ICC Cricket World Cup League 2 and the ICC Cricket World Cup Challenge League. This tournament was used to determine which teams qualified for which of these two competitions, which are a direct part of the 2023 Cricket World Cup qualification process. It was the fourth and last time the World Cricket League was used for Cricket World Cup qualification.

== Tournaments summary ==
| Details | Dates | Host nation(s) | Final | | | |
| Details | Dates | Host nation(s) | Venue | Winner | Result | Runner-up |
|---|---|---|---|---|---|---|
| 2017; Division Five | 3–9 September 2017 | South Africa | Willowmoore Park, Benoni | Jersey; 255 (48 overs) | Jersey won by 120 runs Scorecard | Vanuatu; 135 (36.5 overs) |
| 2018; Division Four | 29 April – 6 May 2018 | Malaysia | n/a | Uganda; 8 points | Uganda topped points table | Denmark; 6 points |
| 2018; Division Three | 9–19 November 2018 | Oman | n/a | Oman; 10 points | Oman topped points table | United States; 8 points |
| 2019; Division Two | 20–27 April 2019 | Namibia | Wanderers Cricket Ground, Windhoek | Namibia; 226/7 (50 overs) | Namibia won by 145 runs Scorecard | Oman; 81 (29 overs) |

== Tournament results ==
Key
| ▲ | Qualified for next division |
| ▼ | Relegated to lower division or regional tournaments (Note: These were the original placements following the conclusion of each division. However, in October 2018, the ICC replaced WCL Divisions Three, Four and Five with the Cricket World Cup Challenge League, with teams ranked 21st to 32nd being assigned to that competition.) |

| Team | Division at start | 2017 Div 5 | 2018 Div 4 | 2018 Div 3 | 2019 Div 2 | Rank at end | League at end |
|---|---|---|---|---|---|---|---|
| Cayman Islands | 5 | 8 ▼ | | | | 36 | None |
| Germany | 5 | 5 ▼ | | | | 33 | None |
| Ghana | 5 | 7 ▼ | | | | 35 | None |
| Guernsey | 5 | 6 ▼ | | | | 34 | None |
| Italy | 5 | 4 ▼ | | | | 32 | Challenge League |
| Jersey | 5 | 1 ▲ | 4 | | | 28 | Challenge League |
| Qatar | 5 | 3 | | | | 31 | Challenge League |
| Vanuatu | 5 | 2 ▲ | 5 ▼ | | | 29 | Challenge League |
| Bermuda | 4 | | 6 ▼ | | | 30 | Challenge League |
| Denmark | 4 | | 2 ▲ | 5 | | 25 | Challenge League |
| Malaysia | 4 | | 3 | | | 27 | Challenge League |
| Uganda | 4 | | 1 ▲ | 6 | | 26 | Challenge League |
| Kenya | 3 | | | 4 | | 24 | Challenge League |
| Oman | 3 | | | 1 ▲ | 2 | 18 | League 2 |
| Singapore | 3 | | | 3 | | 23 | Challenge League |
| United States | 3 | | | 2 ▲ | 4 | 20 | League 2 |
| Canada | 2 | | | | 5 | 21 | Challenge League |
| Hong Kong | 2 | | | | 6 | 22 | Challenge League |
| Namibia | 2 | | | | 1 | 17 | League 2 |
| Papua New Guinea | 2 | | | | 3 | 19 | League 2 |
