= German Cricket Federation =

Highest governing body of cricket in Germany

- Sport: Cricket
- Jurisdiction: Germany
- Abbreviation: DCB
- Founded: 1988; 38 years ago
- Affiliation: International Cricket Council
- Affiliation date: 1991; 35 years ago
- Regional affiliation: ICC Europe
- Affiliation date: 1997; 29 years ago
- Location: Buxtehude, Germany
- CEO: Brian Mantle
- Men's coach: Atiq-uz-Zaman
- Women's coach: Michael Thewlis
- Sponsor: MoneyGram, Lufthansa City Center

Official website
- www.cricket.de
- (Germany)

The German Cricket Federation (German: Deutscher Cricket Bund e.V.) is the national governing body for cricket in Germany. It is commonly known as the DCB. Its current headquarters is in Buxtehude, Germany. The association is responsible for men's, women's and junior cricket across Germany and oversees six regional cricket associations across the country.

The DCB was created in 1988 in a document signed by eight German cricket clubs. In 1991, the DCB became an Affiliate member of the International Cricket Council. In 1999 it graduated to the level of an Associate, after recommendation by Namibia and Pakistan. It is also a member of the ICC Europe (earlier the European Cricket Council). By May 2021, almost 150 clubs were playing cricket in Germany.

== History ==
Germany's first separate cricket body, the Deutscher Cricket Bund (DCB), representing teams from Berlin, Nuremberg, Furth, Düsseldorf, Frankfurt, Mannheim and Hamburg was formed in 1912. The original federation did not last and it was 76 years later that the modern DCB was formed.

Today, there are over 100 cricket clubs across Germany, with nearly 3000 players registered in total. The DCB has a budget of about €220,000 ($241,000) per year, most of which comes from the ICC. With an influx of new cricketers migrating to Germany from Asia, especially Afghan refugees, and an increase in junior players learning the game inside in Germany, the number of cricketers registered with the DCB is expected to continue to rise.

== See also ==
- Germany national cricket team
