= Cricket in Germany =

- Country: Germany
- National team: Germany

International competitions
- Cricket World Cup; ICC World Twenty20; ICC Champions Trophy; Women's Cricket World Cup; Under-19 Cricket World Cup

Cricket in Germany has a history going back to 1858, when a group of people from England and the United States founded the first German cricket club in Berlin. Several more teams were later founded in Berlin and the rest of Germany, as well as a national federation. Cricket lingered on over the following century, with occasional visits of German players to England and British and other foreign teams touring in Germany, but only when it got a foothold in the German universities in the 1980s did the number of German cricket clubs and players start to grow again.

Until recently, much of the cricket was played by British soldiers stationed in Germany. However, in recent years the popularity of the game has increased due to an influx of migrants and refugees from cricket-playing countries

The national organisation for the game is currently the German Cricket Federation (Deutscher Cricket Bund, DCB), founded in 1988. In 2016 there are about 220 cricket teams in the country, up from 70 in 2012. By 2019, the number of teams had increased to 350.

== International team ==
Germany has a national team that takes part in the European Championship and has also taken part in the ICC Trophy.

== Regional associations ==
German Cricket is organized in several regions, which all have their own leagues. The winner of those will play for the national championship.

Those regional associations are:

- Bayrischer Cricket Verband (Bavaria)
  - Cricket in and around Munich
  - Cricket Club of Bayern Munich
  - Lufthansa Services Cricket Club
  - Munich Cricket Club
  - Munich International Cricket Club
  - Pak Orient Cricket Club
  - Erlangen Cricket Club.e.V.
  - Serendib Sports Club
  - SV-DJK Taufkirchen Cricket Club
  - Nuremberg Cricket Club
  - SV Lohhof Cricket near Munich

Other clubs include:

  - Cricket Club Passau e.V.

- Berliner Cricket Verband
  - Berliner Cricket Committee

- Ostdeutscher Cricket Verband (ODCV)

Bundesliga Ost:

- KSV Roter Traktor e.V
  - BFC Viktoria 1889*
  - Rugby Cricket Dresden
  - Britannia 92*
  - Berlin Cricket Club*
  - Der Sports and Social Club zu Berlin und Brandenburg (DSSC)*
  - Reinickendorfer Füchse (RFCC)*
  - Havelländischer Cricket Club Werder (HCCW)
  - USG Chemnitz e.V. Abt. Cricket Club (USG CCC)

Verbandsliga Ost:

  - Bangladesh CC Berlin*
  - BFC Viktoria 1889*
  - Rugby Cricket Dresden
  - Britannia 92*
  - Berlin Cricket Club*
  - Reinickendorfer Füchse (RFCC)*
  - Havelländischer Cricket Club Werder (HCCW)
  - USG Chemnitz e.V. Abt. Cricket Club (USG CCC)
  - Bautzen Cricket Club*
  - AC Berlin (ACB)*

Britannia, BFC Viktoria 1889, Reinickendorfer Füchse (RFCC), AC Berlin, Dresden, HCCW, Bautzen, USG CCC and Berlin CC field a team in the Verbandsliga too.* field a team in the T20-League

Other teams:

  - ACCB
  - Stragglers Cricket Club
  - PCCB (Pakistan Cricket Club Berlin)

- Hessischer Cricket Verband
  - Cosmopolitan Cricket Club Hassloch e.V.
  - Darmstadt Cricket Club (TH & FH Darmstadt)
  - Frankfurt Cricket Club (FCC) e.V.
  - Ruder- und Cricket-Club Hanau e.V.
  - FSV Hellas 71 e.V., Abteilung Cricket
  - Olympia Frankfurt e.V., Abteilung Cricket
  - Rodgau Cricket Club e.V.
  - SKG Walldorf e.V., Abteilung Cricket
  - SV Wiesbaden 1899 e.V., Abteilung Cricket

- North German Cricket Federation

  - HSV-Cricket
  - Oldenburg
  - HICC
  - THCC Rot-Gelb
  - Pak Alemi
  - Buxtehude
  - Lüneburg Panthers
  - Fallingbostel CC
  - Jacobs Universität CC Bremen
  - Hannover
  - CC der Universität Göttingen
  - Schwerin Cricket Club
  - Kiel Cricket Club

- Nordrhein-Westfalen Cricket Union
  - Köln Cricket Club e.V.
  - Bonn Cricket Society e.V.
  - Bonn Royals Cricket Club
  - ASV Köln - CICC
  - Cologne Cricket Club
  - Bonn Cricket Club e.V.
  - Köln Xtremers Cricket Club
  - Dusseldorf Blackcaps
  - Bochum Cricket Club e.V.
  - Rheindahlen Crusaders CC (based in Mönchengladbach)
  - Dortmund Cricket Club e.V.
  - Mülheim a.d. Ruhr Cricket Club e.V.
  - Deutsche Welle CC
  - Bonn Veterans CC
  - Duisburg Cricket Club e.V.
  - Cologne Challengers
  - Golden Stars Cricket Club Bonn

- Baden Württemberg Cricket Verband
  - St. Ingbert Cricket Club
  - Kaiserslautern University CC
  - Cricket Lions Karlsruhe CC
  - Karlsruher CC
  - Heidelberg Rohrbach Stallions
  - TSG-Ketsch
  - Stallions-TSG Wiesloch CC
  - Pak Freiburg Cricket Club, Freiburg
  - Freiburg Nomads CC
  - Cosmopolitan Cricket Club Mannheim
  - Stuttgart Cricket Eagles e.V.
  - TSV Asperg e.V., Cricket Abteilung
  - Stuttgart Cricket Verein e.V.

== Club cricket ==
A feature of club cricket in Germany is that many clubs experience rapid fluctuation in membership, which is composed largely of expats playing the sport. Clubs which cannot join a league (mostly due to lack of available members) may still take part in independently arranged friendly matches.

The club's wicket can vary from a grass pitch (grown on the natural soil) to coconut fibre wickets on concrete, flicx® pitches, and do-it-yourself constructions. The size of the field also varies, from a good club size (English standard) to double hockey pitches which the club hires, and unusual fields such as that at Göttingen, which is large, but has a bank that rises up to 4 metres above the level of the square. Indoor cricket is played in various tournaments throughout the winter, mostly in German 3 field gyms, or in indoor tennis halls, in Twenty20 format.

=== Leagues ===
The majority of cricket clubs are organised into six regional leagues. Each region hosts one or two leagues of 6 or 7 clubs. Matches are over 50 overs. In two of the leagues the first and second placed teams meet in play-offs, and the winner of the play-off is the regional champion. At the end of the regional season, national play-offs are held: the northern league champions (NDCV (North), NRCU (North Rhine Westphalia), BCV (Berlin)) play against each other, and the southern teams (HCV (Hesse), BWCV (Baden Württemberg), BYCV (Bavaria)) do likewise. The overall northern and southern winners then play off for the German Championship. Independent of the regional leagues are 20/20 tournaments which are mostly invitational tournaments initiated by one team.
