= Irfan Bhatti (Kuwait cricketer) =

Kuwaiti cricketer (born 1979)

Personal information
- Born: 14 January 1979 (age 47); Pakistan
- Batting: Right-handed
- Bowling: Right-arm fast-medium
- Role: All rounder

International information
- National side: Kuwait
- Source: CricInfo

Irfan Bhatti (born 1979) is a Pakistani-born cricketer who plays for the Kuwait national cricket team. He is a right-handed batsmen and a right-arm fast medium bowler. He made a match-winning 111 runs against Vanuatu in World Cricket League and won the player of the match award.
