= Russell Withey =

Botswana cricketer (born 1991)

Personal information
- Born: 18 November 1991 (age 34); Johannesburg, South Africa
- Batting: Right-handed
- Bowling: Right arm fast medium

International information
- National side: Botswana
- Source: Cricinfo, 7 September 2015

Russell Withey (born 18 November 1991) is a Botswana cricketer. He played in the 2015 ICC World Cricket League Division Six tournament.
