= Ali Raza (cricketer, born 1981) =

Pakistani cricketer (born 1981)

Personal information
- Born: 16 February 1981 (age 45); Rawalpindi, Punjab Province
- Source: Cricinfo, 7 April 2016

Ali Raza Berni (born 16 February 1981) is a Pakistani former first-class cricketer who played for Islamabad between 1997 and 2002.
