= Munir Ahmed (cricketer) =

Austrian cricketer (born 1970)

Personal information
- Born: 10 November 1970 (age 56)
- Batting: Right-handed

Domestic team information
- Years: Team
- Austria
- Source: Cricinfo, 5 April 2014

Munir Ahmed (born 10 November 1970) is an Austrian former cricketer. He was part of the Austrian team at the 2011 ICC European T20 Championship Division One tournament.
