= Atiq-uz-Zaman =

Pakistani cricketer (born 1975)

Personal information
- Born: November 30, 1975 (age 50); Karachi, Pakistan
- Batting: Right-handed
- Role: Wicket-keeper

International information
- National side: Pakistan
- Only Test (cap 160): 5 March 2000 v Sri Lanka
- ODI debut (cap 134): 20 August 2000 v New Zealand
- Last ODI: 27 August 2000 v South Africa

Head coaching information
- Years: Team
- 2023–2026: Germany

Career statistics
Competition	Test	ODI
Matches	1	3
Runs scored	26	34
Batting average	13.00	17.00
100s/50s	0/0	0/0
Top score	25	18
Catches/stumpings	5/–	3/1
- Source: ESPNCricinfo, 4 February 2006

Atiq-uz-Zaman (born 30 November 1975) is a Pakistani cricket coach and former cricketer. He is a right-handed batsman and a wicketkeeper. He played his only Test match in March 2000, against Sri Lanka. He has played for a number of first-class sides in Pakistan as well as playing club cricket for St Annes Cricket Club in Lancashire, England.

In February 2023, Atiq-uz-Zaman was appointed head coach of the Germany national cricket team.
