= Jikoi Kida =

Fijian cricketer (born 1980)

Personal information
- Born: 21 November 1980 (age 45)
- Batting: Right-handed
- Bowling: Right-arm Medium

International information
- National side: Fiji
- Source: Cricinfo, 7 September 2015

Jikoi Kida (born 21 November 1980) is a Fijian cricketer. He played in the 2015 ICC World Cricket League Division Six tournament.

In August 2018, he was named in Fiji's squad for Group A of the 2018–19 ICC World Twenty20 East Asia-Pacific Qualifier tournament. Kida was the joint-leading wicket-taker for Fiji in the tournament, with seven dismissals in four matches.
