= Waseem Tajbhay =

Botswana cricketer (born 1993)

Personal information
- Born: 31 January 1993 (age 33); Johannesburg, South Africa
- Batting: Right-handed
- Bowling: Right arm medium

International information
- National side: Botswana
- Source: Cricinfo, 7 September 2015

Waseem Tajbhay (born 31 January 1993) is a Botswana cricketer. He played in the 2015 ICC World Cricket League Division Six tournament. In October 2018, he represented Botswana in the Southern sub-region group in the 2018–19 ICC World Twenty20 Africa Qualifier tournament.
