= Denzil Sequeira =

Indian-born Botswana cricketer (born 1990)

Personal information
- Full name: Denzil Kenan Sequeira
- Born: 27 March 1990 (age 36); India
- Batting: Right-handed
- Role: Wicket-keeper
- Source: CricketArchive, 22 February 2016

Denzil Kenan Sequeira (born 27 March 1990) is an Indian-born Botswana cricketer who currently plays for the Botswana national cricket team.
