= Lobatse Cricket Ground =

Cricket ground in Lobatse, Botswana

Coordinates: 25.2171°S 25.6757°E

Lobatse Cricket Ground is cricket ground in Lobatse, Botswana. The ground is one of the three cricket grounds in the country, the other two being Botswana Cricket Association Oval's two grounds (Oval 1 and Oval 2).

Lobatse Cricket Ground has hosted two ICC tournaments: the 2011 ICC World Cricket League Division Seven and the 2013 ICC World Cricket League Division Seven.
