= Ehsan Latif =

German cricketer (born 1985)

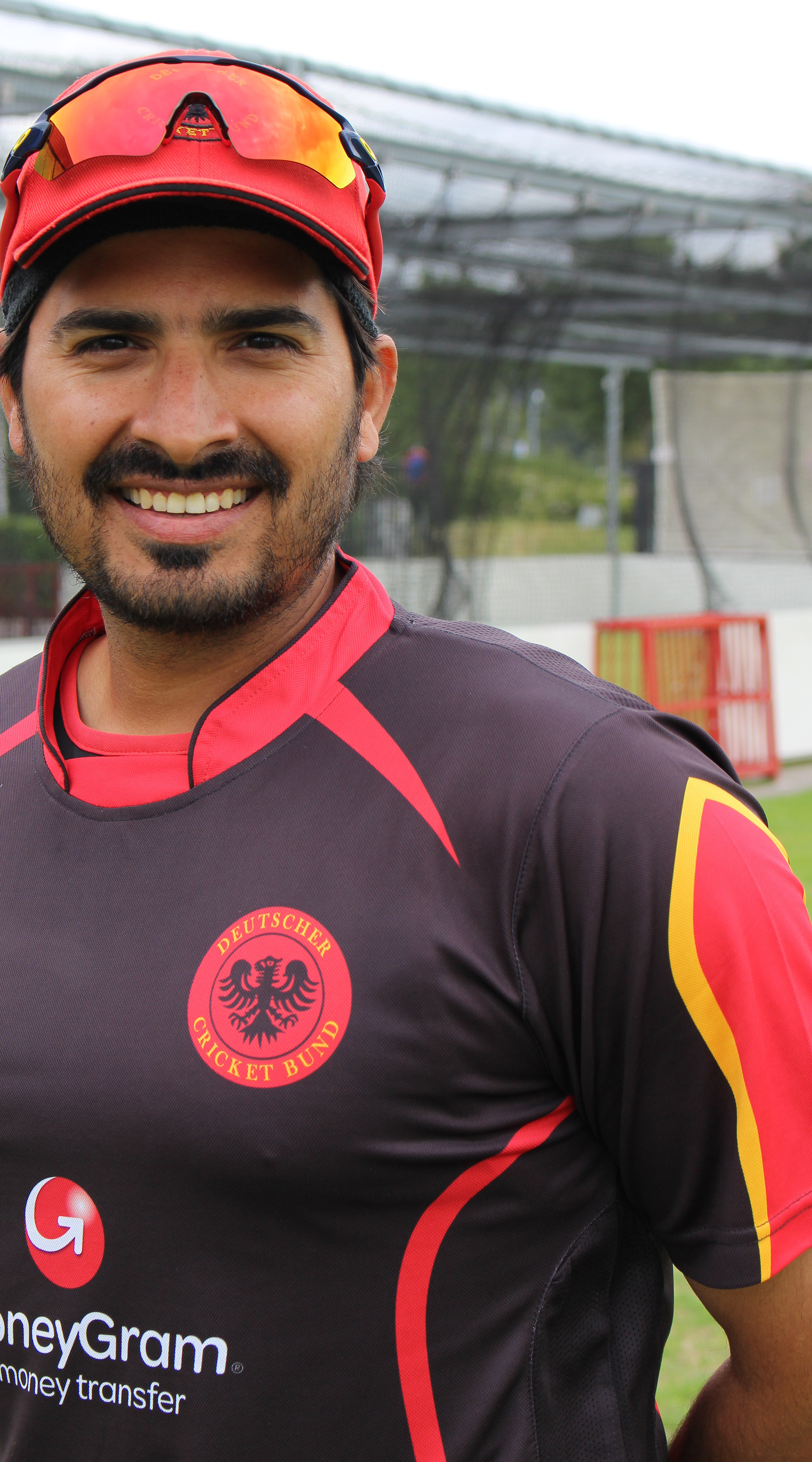

Personal information
- Born: 8 May 1985 (age 41)

International information
- National side: Germany
- Source: Cricinfo, 11 May 2019

Ehsan Latif (born 8 May 1985) is a German cricketer. He was named in Germany's squad for the 2017 ICC World Cricket League Division Five tournament in South Africa. He played in Germany's second fixture, against Jersey, on 4 September 2017.
