= Mohammad Murad =

Kuwaiti wildlife photographer

Mohammad Murad محمد مراد
- Born: 1976 (age 49–50); Kuwait
- Occupation: Wildlife photographer
- Website: mohammadmurad.com

Mohammad Murad (Arabic: محمد مراد; born 1976) is a Kuwaiti wildlife photographer who specializes in bird photography. His photographs have won various international awards.

== Early life ==
Murad was born in Kuwait in 1976. He became interested in photography after watching his father take family photos and videos. Murad has a degree in Communication Engineering. Outside of photography, he works as a communication engineer in television broadcasting.

== Career ==
Murad purchased his first professional camera in 2014 and began his photography career by joining the Kuwait Voluntary Work Center's Photography & Documentary Team. Later in the year, he joined the Birds Monitoring & Protecting Team at the Kuwait Environment Protection Society.

Murad's photographs have been featured in the National Geographic, Business Insider, the Kuwait Times, and other publications.

In 2015, he received his first photography awards, an Honorable Mention at the ND Awards and 2nd place at the 2015 Monochrome Awards for his black-and-white photo of a white-tailed eagle, which he took in Hungary. In 2018, Murad was awarded the Merit Medal by the Hamdan International Photography Award for his black-and-white photography.

He won first prize in the Artistic Vision category at the Festival de l'Oiseau et de la Nature International Wildbird Photo Competition in 2019. In the same year, USA Today reported that he was among the winners of the 2019 National Wildlife Magazine photo contest. In 2020, Murad won the Remarkable Artwork Award in the "Animals in Their Environment" category at the Siena International Photo Awards. Murad also won second place in the Urban Wildlife category at the Nature TTL Photographer of the Year Competition in 2021.

=== Awards ===
- 2017–2018: Merit Medal Recipient, Hamdan International Photography Award (HIPA)
- 2018: First Place – Baby Animals, The National Wildlife Magazine Photo Contest
- 2019: Second Place – Amphibians and Reptiles, The National Wildlife Magazine Photo Contest
- 2019: Honorable Mention – Animals in Their Environment, Siena International Photo Awards
- 2020: Remarkable Artwork – Animals in Their Environment, Siena International Photo Awards
- 2021: Runner-Up – Urban Wildlife Category, Nature TTL Photographer of the Year Competition
