= Muhammad Iqbal Butt =

Pakistani weightlifter (born 1929)

Personal information
- Nationality: Pakistani
- Born: 11 December 1929

Sport
- Sport: Weightlifting

Muhammad Iqbal Butt (born 11 December 1929) was a Pakistani weightlifter. He competed in the men's middleweight event at the 1948, and 1952 Summer Olympics and in the men's light-heavyweight at the 1956 Summer Olympics.
