= Botswana Cricket Association =

Sports governing body in Botswana

- Sport: Cricket
- Jurisdiction: Botswana
- Founded: 1983
- Affiliation: International Cricket Council
- Affiliation date: 2002 (affiliate member); 2005 (associate member)
- Regional affiliation: ICC Africa
- Headquarters: Gaborone
- (Botswana)

The Botswana Cricket Association (BCA) is the official governing body of the sport of cricket in Botswana. Its headquarters is in the national capital Gaborone, at the Botswana Cricket Association Oval. It is affiliated with Botswana National Sports Council (BNSC) and the Botswana National Olympic Committee (BNOC). Established in 1983, the BCA has been a member of the International Cricket Council (ICC) since 2002, and was one of the five founding members of the Africa Cricket Association in 1997.

== History ==
The earliest substantiated record of cricket appears in a paragraph contained in the publication The White Tide by David Sinclair (2000), which notes a cricket match played in the late 1870s in a village named Shoshong between "Home-Born" and the "Colonials". The game was started on a more organised basis after independence in September 1966, mainly by expatriates from Britain, South Africa, India, Pakistan and Sri Lanka who were working in the country. The Botswana Cricket Association was founded on 8 February 1983.

== See also ==
- Botswana national cricket team
- Botswana women's national cricket team
- Botswana national under-19 cricket team
- Botswana women's national under-19 cricket team
