= Niko Unavalu =

Vanuatuan cricketer (born 1991)

Personal information
- Born: 7 May 1991 (age 35)

International information
- National side: Vanuatu
- Source: Cricinfo, 18 July 2015

Niko Unavalu (born 7 May 1991) is a Vanuatuan cricketer. He played in the 2013 ICC World Cricket League Division Six tournament.
