= Dotun Olatunji =

Nigerian cricketer (born 1979)

Personal information
- Born: 22 December 1979 (age 46)

International information
- National side: Nigeria
- Source: Cricinfo, 18 July 2015

Oladotun Olatunji (born 22 December 1979), commonly referred to as Dotun Olatunji, is a Nigerian cricketer. He played in the 2013 ICC World Cricket League Division Six tournament.
