= Jonathon Dunn =

Vanuatuan cricketer (born 1989)

Personal information
- Born: 4 June 1989 (age 37); Vanuatu
- Batting: Right handed
- Bowling: Right-arm medium pace

International information
- National side: Vanuatu (2005–)
- T20I debut (cap 3): 22 March 2019 v PNG
- Last T20I: 24 March 2019 v PNG
- Source: Cricinfo, 24 March 2019

Jonathon Dunn (born 4 June 1989) is a Vanuatuan cricketer.

Dunn was born in Vanuatu to Australian parents. He grew up speaking Bislama as his first language. He moved to Newcastle, Australia, in 2004 to attend high school, and plays grade cricket for Merewether in the Newcastle District Cricket Association.

Dunn made his senior debut for Vanuatu at the age of 16. He played in the 2010 ICC World Cricket League Division Eight and 2013 and 2015 ICC World Cricket League Division Six tournaments.

He was the vice-captain of Vanuatu's squad in the 2018 ICC World Cricket League Division Four tournament in Malaysia. In the team's final match of the tournament against Denmark he scored 86 runs off 139 balls, helping his team to an upset five-wicket victory.

In August 2018, he was named as the vice-captain of Vanuatu's squad for Group A of the 2018–19 ICC World Twenty20 East Asia-Pacific Qualifier tournament. In March 2019, he was named in the Vanuatuan squad for the Regional Finals of the 2018–19 ICC World Twenty20 East Asia-Pacific Qualifier tournament. He made his Twenty20 International (T20I) debut against Papua New Guinea on 22 March 2019.
