= Nigel Morrison =

Vanuatuan cricketer (born 1955)

Personal information
- Full name: Nigel Morrison
- Born: 5 October 1955 (age 70); New Plymouth, New Zealand

Umpiring information
- Source: ESPNcricinfo, 30 May 2016

Nigel Morrison (born 5 October 1955 in New Plymouth) is a Vanuatuan cricket umpire. He is yet to make his international debut but he has stood in many ICC tournaments. He was elected to the ICC Associates and Affiliates Umpire Panel in 2015.
