= World Cricket League =

Series of international one-day cricket tournaments

ICC World Cricket League
- Official logo
- Administrator: International Cricket Council
- Format: One-Day International; List A
- First edition: 2007
- Latest edition: 2019
- Tournament format: League system
- Number of teams: 93 nations
- Most runs: (Jersey) Peter Gough (2006)
- Most wickets: (Nepal) Basanta Regmi (118)
- Website: ICC World Cricket League

The ICC World Cricket League (WCL) was a series of international one-day cricket tournaments for national teams without Test status (i.e., teams of Associate status) administered by the International Cricket Council. All Associate Members of the ICC were eligible to compete in the league system, which featured a promotion and relegation structure between divisions. The league system had two main aims: to provide a qualification system for the Cricket World Cup that could be accessed by all Associate Members and as an opportunity for these sides to play international one-day matches against teams of similar standards.

The league began in 2007, where teams were allocated into divisions based on their performance in the qualification tournaments for the 2007 World Cup; the six initial teams in Division One were the teams that had qualified for the 2007 World Cup. At this stage, there were only five divisions. The WCL expanded to eight divisions at one point.

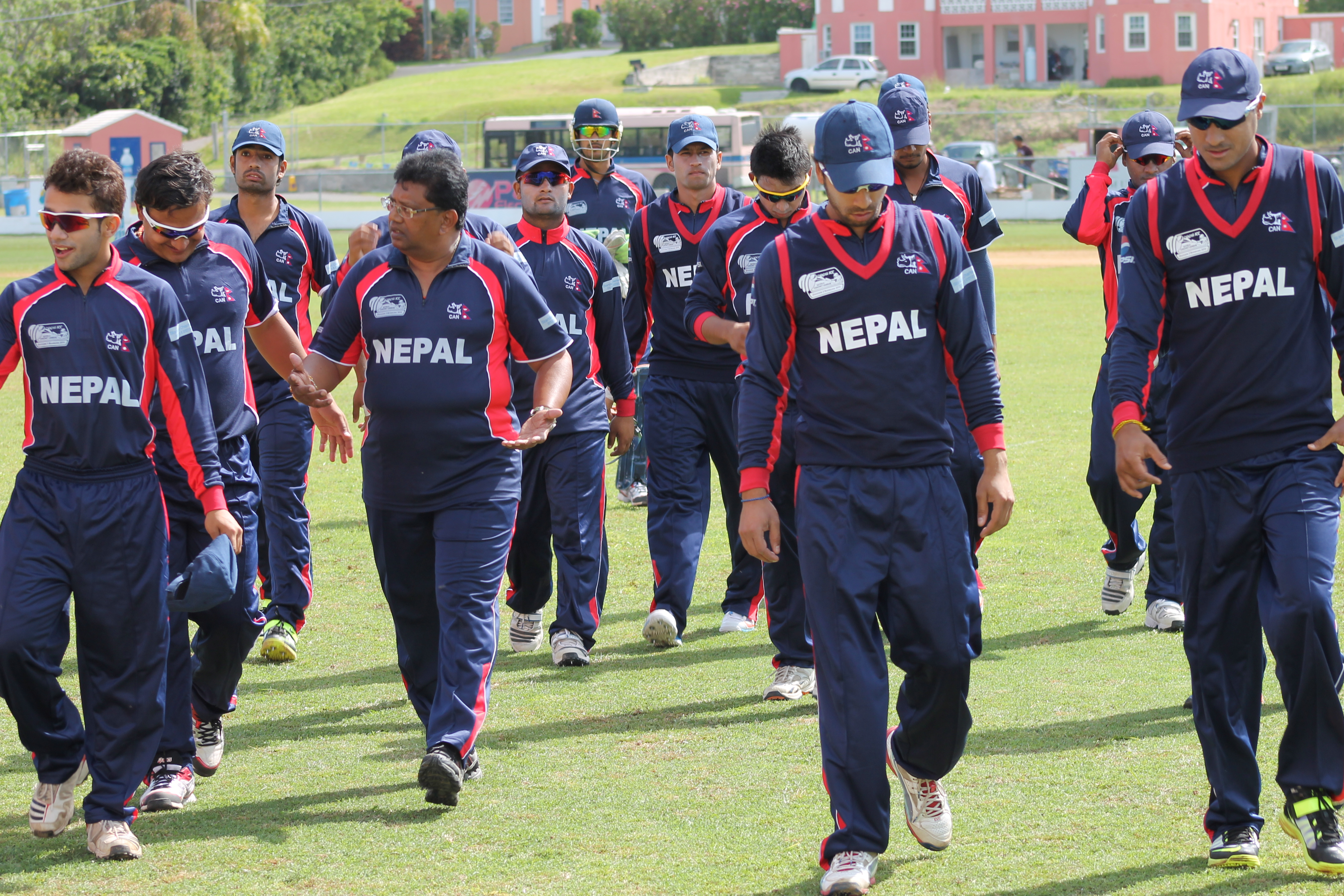
Nepal national cricket team during 2013 ICC World Cricket League Division Three

The WCL was a pathway to the Cricket World Cup until 2019. Following the conclusion of the 2019 Division Two tournament, the WCL was replaced by the ICC Cricket World Cup League 2 and the ICC Cricket World Cup Challenge League. The final rankings from the WCL were used to place teams into the two new leagues.

== Structure ==
The initial league began in 2007 with seven tournaments over five global divisions, based upon previous world rankings. This was expanded into eight separate divisions by 2010. In the first cycle, the number of teams in each tournament varied from six to twelve. With the advent of the second cycle, the number of teams was regularised to six for each tournament, with the exception of the lowest division, Division 8, in which eight teams played. As from 2015, the number of divisions was again reduced to just five.

When most of the divisions are played, two teams will be promoted, two relegated and two remain for the next instalment (normally two years later). At the end of each cycle, a World Cup Qualifier is played. In 2018, this featured the four lowest teams of those holding 'Full' (senior) status, together with six 'Associate' nations – namely the four who were still in Division One, plus the top two from Division Two. The two last-placed teams in that World Cup Qualifier lost their ODI status and were relegated into Division Two.

Regional tournaments, which act as qualifiers for the lowest division of the World League, are administered by the five development regions of the International Cricket Council: Africa, Americas, Asia, East Asia-Pacific, and Europe.

== Results ==
=== Summary ===
Cycle	Pre-qualification for	Divisions	World Cup qualification tournament(s)
2007–09	2011 Cricket World Cup	5	2009 Cricket World Cup Qualifier
2009–14	2015 Cricket World Cup	8	2011–13 ICC World Cricket League Championship, 2014 Cricket World Cup Qualifier
2012–18	2019 Cricket World Cup	8	2018 Cricket World Cup Qualifier
2017–19	League 2, Challenge League → 2023 Cricket World Cup	5	2023 Cricket World Cup Qualifier

=== Division results ===
Details	Host nation(s)	Final venue	Final		
Details	Host nation(s)	Final venue	Winner	Result	Runner-up
2007–09 ICC World Cricket League – Pathway to the 2011 Cricket World Cup
2007; Division Three	Australia	Gardens Oval, Darwin	Uganda; 241/8 (50 overs)	Uganda won by 91 runs scorecard	Argentina; 150 all out (46.3 overs)
2007; Division Two	Namibia	Wanderers Cricket Ground, Windhoek	United Arab Emirates; 347/8 (50 overs)	United Arab Emirates won by 67 runs scorecard	Oman; 280 all out (43.2 overs)
2007; Division One	Kenya	Nairobi Gymkhana Club, Nairobi	Kenya; 158/2 (37.5 overs)	Kenya won by 8 wickets Scorecard	Scotland; 155 all out (47 overs)
2008; Division Five	Jersey	Grainville, St Saviour	Afghanistan; 81/8 (37.4 overs)	Afghanistan won by 2 wickets Scorecard	Jersey; 80 all out (39.5 overs)
2008; Division Four	Tanzania	Kinondoni Ground, Dar es Salaam	Afghanistan; 179 all out (49.4 overs)	Afghanistan won by 57 runs Scorecard	Hong Kong; 122 all out (45.0 overs)
2009; Division Three	Argentina	Belgrano Athletic Club, Buenos Aires	Afghanistan; 8 points, +0.971(NRR)	League; Table	Uganda; 8 points, +0.768(NRR)
2009; WC Qualifier	South Africa	SuperSport Park, Centurion, Gauteng	Ireland; 188/1 (42.3 overs)	Ireland won by 9 wickets (scorecard)	Canada; 185 all out (48 overs)
2009–14 ICC World Cricket League – Pathway to the 2015 Cricket World Cup
2009; Division Seven	Guernsey	King George V Sports Ground, Castel	Bahrain; 207/7 (46.1 overs)	Bahrain won by 3 wickets (scorecard)	Guernsey; 204/9 (50.0 overs)
2009; Division Six	Singapore	Kallang Cricket Ground, Singapore	Singapore; 242/8 (50.0 overs)	Singapore won by 68 runs (scorecard)	Bahrain; 174 all out (48.4 overs)
2010; Division Five	Nepal	TU Cricket Ground, Kathmandu	Nepal; 173/5 (46.5 overs)	Nepal won by 5 wickets (Match report)	United States; 172 (47.2 overs)
2010; Division Four	Italy	Centro Sportivo Dozza, Pianoro	United States; 188/2 (21.4 overs)	United States won by 8 wickets (Match report)	Italy; 185/9 (50.0 overs)
2010; Division Eight	Kuwait	Kuwait Oil Company Hubara Ground, Ahmadi City	Kuwait; 164/4 (33.1 overs)	Kuwait won by 6 wickets (Match report)	Germany; 163/8 (50.0 overs)
2010; Division One	Netherlands	VRA Cricket Ground, Amstelveen	Ireland; 233/4 (44.5 overs)	Ireland won by 6 wickets (scorecard)	Scotland; 232 (44.5 overs)
2011; Division Seven	Botswana	Botswana Cricket Association Oval 1, Gaborone	Kuwait; 219/9 (50 overs)	Kuwait won by 72 runs (Match report)	Nigeria; 147 (36.5 overs)
2011; Division Six	Malaysia	Kinrara Academy Oval, Kuala Lumpur	Guernsey; 211/8 (49.3 overs)	Guernsey won by 2 wickets (Match report)	Malaysia; 208/9 (50 overs)
2011; Division Three	Hong Kong	Kowloon Cricket Club, Hong Kong	Hong Kong; 207/6 (47.1 overs)	Hong Kong won by 4 wickets (Match report)	Papua New Guinea; 202/9 (50 overs)
2011; Division Two	UAE	DSC Cricket Stadium, Dubai	United Arab Emirates; 201/5 (45.3 overs)	United Arab Emirates won by 5 wickets (Match report)	Namibia; 200 (49.3 overs)
2012; Division Five	Singapore	Kallang Ground, Singapore	Singapore; 164/1 (26.4 overs)	Singapore won by 9 wickets (Match report)	Malaysia; 159 (47 overs)
2012; Division Four	Malaysia	Kinrara Academy Oval, Kuala Lumpur	Nepal; 147/2 (28 overs)	Nepal won by 8 wickets (Match Report)	United States; 145 (48.1 overs)
2013; Division Three	Bermuda	National Stadium, Hamilton	Nepal; 153/5 (39.2 overs)	Nepal won by 5 wickets Scorecard	Uganda; 151/8 (50.0 overs)
2011–13; Championship	Various	No final	Ireland; 24 points	League; Table	Afghanistan; 19 points
2014; WC Qualifier	New Zealand	Bert Sutcliffe Oval, Lincoln	Scotland; 285/5 (50 overs)	Scotland won by 41 runs Scorecard	United Arab Emirates; 244/9 (50.0 overs)
2012–18 ICC World Cricket League – Pathway to the 2019 Cricket World Cup
2012; Division Eight	Samoa	Faleata Oval No 1, Apia	Vanuatu; 222/9 (50 overs)	Vanuatu won by 39 runs (Match report)	Ghana; 183 (42.5 overs)
2013; Division Seven	Botswana	Botswana Cricket Association Oval 1, Gaborone	Nigeria; 134/4 (32.1 overs)	Nigeria won by 6 wickets Scorecard	Vanuatu; 133 (38.4 overs)
2013; Division Six	Jersey	—	Jersey	Playoffs cancelled	Nigeria
2014; Division Five	Malaysia	Kinrara Academy Oval, Kuala Lumpur	Jersey; 247/8 (50 overs)	Jersey won by 71 runs Scorecard	Malaysia; 176 (44.4 overs)
2014; Division Four	Singapore	Kallang, Singapore	Malaysia; 235/7 (50 overs)	Malaysia won by 57 runs Scorecard	Singapore; 178 (46.1 overs)
2014; Division Three	Malaysia	Kinrara Academy Oval, Kuala Lumpur	Nepal; 223/10 (49.5 overs)	Nepal won by 62 runs Scorecard	Uganda; 161 (44.1 overs)
2015; Division Two	Namibia	Wanderers Cricket Ground, Windhoek	Netherlands; 213/2 (41 overs)	Netherlands won by 8 wickets Scorecard	Namibia; 212 (49.2 overs)
2015; Division Six	England	County Cricket Ground, Chelmsford	Suriname; 239/4 (45.1 overs)	Suriname won by 6 wickets Scorecard	Guernsey; 237 (49.5 overs)
2016; Division Five	Jersey	Grainville Cricket Ground, Saint Savior	Jersey; 194/7 (50 overs)	Jersey won by 44 runs Scorecard	Oman; 150 (45.3 overs)
2016; Division Four	United States	Leo Magnus Cricket Complex, Los Angeles	United States; 208 (49.4 overs)	United States won by 13 runs Scorecard	Oman; 195/9 (50 overs)
2017; Division Three	Uganda	Entebbe Cricket Oval	Oman; 50/2 (4.3 overs)	No result Scorecard (Oman declared winner by virtue of finishing league at top)	Canada; 176/3 (38 Overs)
2015–17; Championship	Various	No final	Netherlands; 22 points	League; Points Table	Scotland; 19 points
2018; Division Two	Namibia	Wanderers Cricket Ground, Windhoek	United Arab Emirates; 277/4 (50 Overs)	United Arab Emirates won by 7 runs Scorecard	Nepal; 270/8 (50 Overs)
2018; WC Qualifier	Zimbabwe	Harare Sports Club, Harare	Afghanistan; 206/3 (40.4 overs)	Afghanistan won by 7 wickets Scorecard	West Indies; 204 (46.5 overs)
2017–19 ICC World Cricket League – Pathway to the 2023 Cricket World Cup
2017; Division Five	South Africa	Willowmoore Park, Benoni	Jersey; 255 (48 Overs)	Jersey won by 120 runs Scorecard	Vanuatu; 135 (36.5 Overs)
2018; Division Four	Malaysia	No final	Uganda; 8 points	League; Points Table	Denmark; 6 points
2018; Division Three	Oman	No final	Oman; 10 points	League; Points Table	United States; 8 points
2019; Division Two	Namibia	Wanderers Cricket Ground, Windhoek	Namibia; 226/7 (50 overs)	Namibia won by 145 runs Scorecard	Oman; 81 (29 overs)

== Associate one-day rankings ==
In late 2005, the International Cricket Council ranked the top non-Test nations from 11–30 to complement the Test nations' rankings in the ICC ODI Championship. The ICC used the results from the 2005 ICC Trophy and WCQS Division 2 competition (i.e. the primary qualification mechanisms for the 2007 Cricket World Cup) to rank the nations.

These rankings were used to seed the initial stage of the global World Cricket League. Teams ranked 11–16 were placed into Division 1; teams 17–20 were placed into Division 2; teams 21–24 were placed into Division 3; the remaining teams were placed into the upper divisions of their respective regional qualifiers.

In 2005, six associates were assigned One Day International status, based on their performance at the preceding World Cup Qualifier. In 2017, Afghanistan and Ireland were both promoted to "Full" (test-match) status, leaving only four associate nations with ODI-status: after mid-March 2018 these were Scotland, Netherlands, UAE, and Nepal. Netherlands, as winners of the 2015–17 ICC World Cricket League Championship, have qualified for a place in the 2020–22 ICC Cricket World Cup Super League. In May 2009, the ICC added a rankings table for the associate and affiliate members containing both global and regional placings. In 2016 this changed to maintain a global list only for the top teams and a set of regional lists for the remaining teams.

=== Rankings ===
The global rankings of associate teams according to ICC are published in the table below. Teams that have One Day International status are now included on the main ICC ODI Championship and are listed in the order they appear on that table. The other teams are ranked by their finishing position in the most recent qualifying tournament.

The rankings at the end of the WCL (27 April 2019):

Division (Note: Division means the league the team is either currently competing in or will next compete in)	Rank	Nation	Region	Regional rank
ODI Status	13	Netherlands	Europe	1
ODI Status	14	Scotland	Europe	2
ODI Status	15	United Arab Emirates	Asia	1
ODI Status	16	Nepal	Asia	2
ODI Status	17	Namibia	Africa	1
ODI Status	18	Oman	Asia	3
ODI Status	19	Papua New Guinea	EAP	1
ODI Status	20	United States	Americas	1
Division 2	21	Canada	Americas	2
Division 2	22	Hong Kong	Asia	4
Division 3	23	Singapore	Asia	5
Division 3	24	Kenya	Africa	2
Division 3	25	Denmark	Europe	3
Division 3	26	Uganda	Africa	3
Division 4	27	Malaysia	Asia	6
Division 4	28	Jersey	Europe	4
Division 4	29	Vanuatu	EAP	2
Division 4	30	Bermuda	Americas	3
Division 5	31	Qatar	Asia	7
Division 5	32	Italy	Europe	5
Division 5	33	Germany	Europe	6
Division 5	34	Guernsey	Europe	7
Division 5	35	Ghana	Africa	4
Division 5	36	Cayman Islands	Americas	4

=== Regional rankings ===
Teams that do not participate in (or have been relegated from) the World Cricket League are ranked by their finishing positions in their respective regional leagues:

Africa
Rank	Country
5	Botswana
6	Tanzania
7	Nigeria
8	Zambia
9	Sierra Leone
N/A	Seychelles
N/A	Mozambique
N/A	Swaziland
N/A	Rwanda
N/A	Gambia
N/A	Lesotho
N/A	Malawi
N/A	Saint Helena
N/A	Morocco
N/A	Cameroon
N/A	Mali

Americas
Rank	Country
5	Argentina
N/A	Suriname
N/A	Bahamas
N/A	Panama
N/A	Belize
N/A	Turks and Caicos Islands
N/A	Brazil
N/A	Peru
N/A	Chile
N/A	Mexico
N/A	Costa Rica
N/A	Falkland Islands

Asia
Rank	Country
8	Saudi Arabia
9	Bahrain
10	Kuwait
11	Thailand
12	Bhutan
13	China
N/A	Maldives
N/A	Iran
N/A	Myanmar
N/A	Tajikistan
N/A	Cambodia **
N/A	Chinese Taipei **

East-Asia Pacific
Rank	Country
3	Fiji
4	Samoa
5	Philippines
6	Indonesia
7	Japan
N/A	Cook Islands
N/A	South Korea
N/A	Tonga

Europe
Rank	Country
8	Sweden
9	Norway
10	Austria
11	Belgium
12	France
13	Spain
14	Israel
15	Isle of Man
16	Gibraltar
N/A	Bulgaria
N/A	Croatia
N/A	Cyprus
N/A	Czech Republic
N/A	Estonia
N/A	Finland
N/A	Greece
N/A	Hungary
N/A	Luxembourg
N/A	Malta
N/A	Portugal
N/A	Romania
N/A	Russia
N/A	Serbia
N/A	Slovenia
N/A	Turkey

** Not member of ICC, but member of Asian Cricket Council.

== See also ==
- ICC Intercontinental Cup – the equivalent first class competition
- ICC World Twenty20 Qualifier – a competition between associate and affiliate teams for entry into the Twenty20 World Cup
