= Joshua Ogunlola =

Nigerian cricketer (born 1987)

Personal information
- Born: 19 April 1987 (age 39)

International information
- National side: Nigeria
- Source: Cricinfo, 19 July 2015

Joshua Ogunlola (born 19 April 1987) is a Nigerian cricketer. He played in the 2014 ICC World Cricket League Division Five tournament.
