= Botswana national cricket team =

Cricket team from Botswana

Botswana
- Botswana Cricket Association logo
- Nickname: Baggy Blues
- Association: Botswana Cricket Association

Personnel
- Captain: Thatayaone Tshose
- Coach: Stanley Timoni

International Cricket Council
- ICC status: Associate member (2005)
- ICC region: Africa
ICC Rankings	Current	Best-ever
T20I	50th	30th (2 May 2019)

International cricket
- First international: 2 September 2002 v Zambia at Lusaka, Zambia

T20 Internationals
- First T20I: v Uganda at Lugogo Stadium, Kampala; 20 May 2019
- Last T20I: v Sierra Leone at Gahanga International Cricket Stadium, Kigali; 18 September 2026
T20Is	Played	Won/Lost
Total	77	32/44 (0 ties, 1 no result)
This year	19	11/8 (0 ties, 0 no results)
- T20 World Cup Qualifier appearances: 1 (Note: T20 World Cup Qualifier refers to the Regional Final of the ICC Africa region from the 2023 edition.) (first in 2025)
- Best result: 8th place (2025)
T20I kit
- As of 18 September 2026

The Botswana national cricket team is the men's team that represents Botswana in international cricket. They have been an associate member of the International Cricket Council (ICC) since 2005, after previously being an affiliate member since 2001 and an associate member in 2017. They are in Division Five of the World Cricket League and are ranked at joint 29th in the world by the ICC. They are the 5th-highest ranked non-Test team in the African region. The team's coach is former Kenyan ODI player Joseph Angara, who was appointed in July 2015.

== History ==
Cricket was started in the country by expatriates from South Africa and the Indian subcontinent. Botswana was elected to the ICC as an affiliate member in 2001, and played in the Africa Cup in Zambia the following year. After winning all their first-round matches against Namibia, Tanzania, Zambia and Zimbabwe, they beat Kenya in the semi-final before losing by 270 runs to South Africa in the final.

In March 2004, they won the African affiliates qualifying tournament for the 2005 ICC Trophy, qualifying them for the next stage of qualification, the Africa Cricket Association Championships. They beat Nigeria and Tanzania in that tournament in Zambia in August, finishing fourth, thus missing out on qualification for their first ICC Trophy. They were rewarded for their performance in this tournament by being promoted to associate membership of the ICC in 2005.

In 2006, they took part in Division Two of the African region of the World Cricket League, finishing second behind Tanzania. This qualified them for Division Five of the World Cricket League.

In May 2008, Botswana travelled to Jersey to take part in the Division Five tournament. Although Botswana beat the Bahamas in Group B, it was their only group stage win and with three losses and one match abandoned due to rain they failed to make the semi-finals. Botswana finished sixth overall after defeating Germany but losing to Singapore in positional playoff matches. With only the top two from this tournament qualifying for Division Four in Tanzania later in the year, Botswana missed out on the chance to take their 2011 World Cup dream any further.

In October 2008, Botswana took part in Division Two of the African region of the World Cricket League, finishing unbeaten and winning the tournament. This victory promoted them to Division One of the Africa Region.

In August 2009, Botswana travelled to Singapore to participate in Division Six of the World Cricket League. Despite being competitive in most of their games, Botswana won only one of five group matches and finished fifth after beating Norway in a positional playoff.

In May 2011, Botswana hosted the ICC World Cricket League Division Seven with a young squad and performed admirably well, winning three league stage matches against Norway, Japan and Germany but losing out to eventual champions Kuwait, 2nd placed Nigeria and finally Germany in the placing match. The match versus Nigeria in the league stages was to decide which of the 2 nations would progress to the ICC World Cricket League Division Six to be held in Malaysia in September 2011 and by losing that match, Botswana failed to progress and will remain in Division Seven till the next instalment of the ICC WCL.

In April 2013, Botswana were given hosting rights again for the ICC World Cricket League Division 7 in their second attempt in trying to get promoted out of Division 7 after halting the relegation slide in the last edition. Beating Ghana in the first match, Botswana lost their second match in a competitive encounter against Vanuatu by 23 runs. Botswana then lost third next match heavily to eventual WCL Div 7 winners and arch rivals Nigeria. Botswana tried in vain to get back into contention for promotion but after a tied match against Germany, all hopes were dashed and the best they could hope for was a third-place finish. This was achieved by beating Fiji in the last group match and then beating them again in the third-place playoff earning Botswana a third place, finishing behind Vanuatu and Nigeria who were both promoted to Division 6 of the WCL. With the ICC's decision to eliminate the ICC World Cricket League Divisions 7 and 8, Botswana will now have to qualify through regional tournaments to make it into the ICC World Cricket League Division 6, which will now be the entry point for the World Cricket League.

=== 2018–present ===
In April 2018, the ICC decided to grant full Twenty20 International (T20I) status to all its members. Therefore, all Twenty20 matches played between Botswana and other ICC members since 1 January 2019 have the full T20I status.

Botswana’s first T20I match was against Uganda on 20 May 2019, after finishing first in the Southern sub-region qualification group, advancing to the Regional Final of the 2018–19 ICC World Twenty20 Africa Qualifier tournament.

20 May 2019
13:50
Scorecard

Uganda; 142/7 (20 overs)	v	Botswana; 90 (18 overs)
Arnold Otwani 44 (27); Karabo Modise 3/18 (3 overs)		Vinoo Balakrishnan 26 (32); Frank Nsubuga 2/19 (4 overs)

Uganda won by 52 runs
Lugogo Stadium, Kampala
Umpires: Emmanuel Byiringiro (Rwa) and David Odhiambo (Ken)
Player of the match: Arnold Otwani (Uga)

- Botswana won the toss and elected to field.
- First ever T20I match for Botswana.

== Grounds ==
- BCA Ground (Oval 1 & 2), Gaborone
- Lobatse Cricket Ground, Lobatse
Locations of all stadiums within Botswana which have hosted cricket matches with international status

== Tournament history ==
=== T20 World Cup Africa Regional Final ===
T20 World Cup Africa Regional Final records
Year	Round	Position	GP	W	L	T	NR
(Uganda) 2019	Round-robin	5/6	5	0	3	0	2
(Rwanda) 2021	Did not qualify						
(Namibia) 2023	Did not qualify						
(Zimbabwe) 2025	Play-offs	8/8	5	0	5	0	0
Total	2/4	0 Title	10	0	8	0	2

- A – Advanced to Global Qualifier.
- Q – Qualified for T20 World Cup.

=== ACA Africa T20 Cup ===
ACA Africa T20 Cup records
Host/Year	Round	Position	GP	W	L	T	NR
(South Africa) 2022	Semi-finals	4/8	4	2	2	0	0
(South Africa) 2023	Champions	3/8	5	2	3	0	0
Total	2/2	0 Titles	10	4	5	0	0

=== Other tournaments ===
World Cricket League (List A/ODI)	WCL Africa Region (List A)	T20WC Africa Sub-regional Qualifiers (T20I)
2008: Division Five 6th place; 2009: Division Six 5th place; 2011: Division Seven 4th place; 2013: Division Seven 3rd place; 2015: Division Six 6th place	2006: Division Two runners-up; 2008: Division Two winners	2018 (South): Winners — Advanced; 2021: Runners-up; 2022: 4th place; 2024: Runners-up — Advanced

== Records and statistics ==
International match summary

Last updated 18 September 2026

Playing Record
Format	M	W	L	T	NR	Inaugural Match
Twenty20 Internationals	77	32	44	0	1	20 May 2019

=== Twenty20 International ===
- Highest team total: 255/3 v Ivory Coast, 28 May 2026 at Botswana Cricket Association Oval 1, Gaborone
- Highest individual score: 112*, Karabo Motlhanka v Ivory Coast, 28 May 2026 at Botswana Cricket Association Oval 1, Gaborone
- Best individual bowling figures: 6/2, Nabil Master v Mali, 24 May 2026 at Botswana Cricket Association Oval 1, Gaborone

Most T20I runs for Botswana

Player	Runs	Average	Career span
Karabo Motlhanka	1,629	30.16	2019–2025
Vinoo Balakrishnan	1,244	24.88	2019–2026
Reginald Nehonde	906	21.57	2019–2026
Tharindu Perera	732	23.61	2023–2026
Thatayaone Tshose	589	14.02	2019–2026

Most T20I wickets for Botswana

Player	Wickets	Average	Career span
Dhruv Maisuria	87	11.51	2019–2026
Mmoloki Mooketsi	75	18.16	2019–2026
Katlo Piet	56	17.28	2019–2026
Thatayaone Tshose	34	26.67	2019–2026
Boemo Khumalo	28	28.82	2019–2026

T20I record versus other nations

Records complete to T20I #4131. Last updated 18 September 2026.

Opponent	M	W	L	T	NR	First match	First win
vs Full Members
Zimbabwe	1	0	1	0	0	28 September 2025	
vs Associate Members
Cameroon	2	2	0	0	0	5 November 2021	5 November 2021
Eswatini	2	2	0	0	0	29 May 2023	29 May 2023
Ghana	2	2	0	0	0	18 September 2022	18 September 2022
Ivory Coast	2	2	0	0	0	26 November 2024	26 November 2024
Kenya	8	1	7	0	0	24 November 2022	15 June 2023
Lesotho	6	6	0	0	0	18 November 2022	18 November 2022
Malawi	4	2	2	0	0	20 November 2022	30 May 2023
Mali	2	2	0	0	0	22 November 2022	22 November 2022
Mozambique	3	3	0	0	0	6 November 2021	6 November 2021
Namibia	5	0	5	0	0	22 May 2019	
Nigeria	6	1	5	0	0	21 May 2019	7 December 2024
Rwanda	10	2	8	0	0	17 November 2022	10 June 2023
Saint Helena	2	2	0	0	0	25 November 2022	25 November 2022
Seychelles	1	0	0	0	1	17 November 2022	
Sierra Leone	6	5	1	0	0	2 November 2021	2 November 2021
Tanzania	3	0	3	0	0	7 November 2021	
Uganda	12	0	12	0	0	20 May 2019	

=== Other records ===
For a list of selected international matches played by Botswana, see Cricket Archive.

== Squad ==
This lists all the players who have played for Botswana in the past 12 months or has been part of the latest T20I squad. Updated as of 19 June 2023.

Name	Age	Batting style	Bowling style	Notes
Batters
Karabo Motlhanka	34	Left-handed		Captain
Phemelo Silas	25	Right-handed	Right-arm leg break	
Vinoo Balakrishan	37	Right-handed	Right-arm off break	
Ameer Saiyed	30	Left-handed	Slow left-arm orthodox	
All-rounders
Reginald Nehonde	36	Right-handed	Right-arm off break	
Thatayaone Tshose	30	Right-handed	Right-arm fast	
Wicket-keepers
Valentine Mbazo	27	Right-handed		
Rod Mbaiwa	23	Right-handed		
Spin Bowlers
Mmoloki Mooketsi	29	Left-handed	Slow left-arm orthodox	
Dhruv Maisuria	28	Right-handed	Right-arm leg break	
Katlo Piet	23	Left-handed	Slow left-arm orthodox	
Pace Bowlers
Boemo Khumalo	24	Right-handed	Right-arm medium-fast	
Boteng Maphosa	24	Right-handed	Right-arm medium-fast	
Boemo Kgoseimang	27	Right-handed	Right-arm medium	

== Coaches ==
- 2010–2013: (Singapore) Arjun Menon
- 2015: (South Africa) Johan Rudolph (interim)
- 2015–2023: (Kenya) Joseph Angara
- 2023–present: (Zimbabwe) Stanley Timoni

== See also ==
- List of Botswana Twenty20 International cricketers
- Botswana women's national cricket team
