= Germany national cricket team =

Germany
- Germany Cricket Federation logo
- Association: German Cricket Federation

Personnel
- Captain: Musaddiq Ahmed
- Coach: Donovan Miller

International Cricket Council
- ICC status: Affiliate (1991); Associate (1999)
- ICC region: Europe
ICC Rankings	Current	Best-ever
T20I	36th	30th (26 June 2019)

International cricket
- First international: v. Denmark at Kolding; 26 May 1989 (as West Germany)

T20 Internationals
- First T20I: v. Belgium at Royal Brussels Cricket Club, Waterloo; 11 May 2019
- Last T20I: v. Finland at Kerava National Cricket Ground, Kerava; 21 August 2026
T20Is	Played	Won/Lost
Total	79	49/30 (0 ties, 0 no results)
This year	15	10/5 (0 ties, 0 no results)
- T20 World Cup Qualifier appearances: 2 (Note: From 2023 edition onwards, T20 World Cup Qualifier refers to the Regional Final of the ICC Europe region.) (first in 2022)
- Best result: 5th place (2023)
T20I kit
- As of 21 August 2026

The German national cricket team is the men's team that represents Germany in international cricket. The German Cricket Federation, which organises the team, has been an associate member of the International Cricket Council (ICC) since 1999, having previously been an affiliate member from 1991. The team made its international debut against Denmark in 1989, playing as West Germany. It has since played regularly in European Cricket Championship tournaments, as well as twice in the lower divisions of the World Cricket League. In 2001, Germany also competed in the ICC Trophy (now the World Cup Qualifier) for the first and only time. In 2022, they played their first T20 World Cup Global Qualifier.

== History ==
Germany became an affiliate member of the ICC in 1991. As West Germany, the country had played its first internationals in 1989, a two-match series against Denmark. The team made its international tournament debut in 1990, at the European Cricketer Cup in Guernsey. They hosted that tournament (which had been renamed the European Nations Cup) in 1996, playing against France, Portugal, and Sweden, and finished as runners up in the 1997 tournament after losing to France by one run in the final, the winning run being scored by David Bordes whilst he had a skull fracture. The Wisden Cricketers' Almanack later listed the final as one of the 100 best matches of the 20th century.

In 1998, Germany competed in the European Championship for the first time and finished seventh. They became an associate member of the ICC the following year and played in Division Two of the European Championship in 2000, finishing as runners-up to Gibraltar.

They played at the 2001 ICC Trophy in Canada, their first and, to date, only appearance in the ICC Trophy. They failed to progress beyond the first round and again finished as runners up to Gibraltar in Division Two of the European Championship the following year. They also played in Division Two in 2004, finishing third, and in 2006, again finishing third.

=== 2018–Present ===
In April 2018, the ICC decided to grant full Twenty20 International (T20I) status to all its members. Therefore, all Twenty20 matches played between Germany and other ICC members after 1 January 2019 have had the full T20I status.

In September 2018, Germany qualified from Group A of the 2018–19 ICC World Twenty20 Europe Qualifier to the Regional Finals of the tournament.

Germany played their first Twenty20 Internationals in May 2019, when they travelled to Brussels for three matches against Belgium, and then two matches against Italy in the Netherlands later the same month. These matches provided the team with some preparation ahead of the ICC World T20 European regional qualifier finals that were played in June 2019.

11 May 2019
11:00
Scorecard

Germany; 128/7 (20 overs)	v	Belgium; 119/6 (20 overs)
Harmanjot Singh 39* (27); Murid Ekrami 1/10 (1 over)		Shaheryar Butt 30* (27); Ahmed Wardak 3/31 (4 overs)

Germany won by 9 runs
Royal Brussels Cricket Club, Waterloo
Umpires: Mark Jameson (Ger) and Andrew Scott (Bel)
Player of the match: Ahmed Wardak (Ger)

- Belgium won the toss and elected to field.
- First ever T20I match for Germany.

== Tournament history ==
=== ICC Cricket World Cup ===
Cricket World Cup records
Year	Round	Position	GP	W	L	T	NR	Win%
(England) 1975	Did not participate							
(England) 1979	Did not qualify							
(England) (Wales) 1983	Did not qualify							
(India) (Pakistan) 1987	Did not qualify							
(Australia) (New Zealand) 1992	Did not qualify							
(India) (Pakistan) (Sri Lanka) 1996	Did not qualify							
(England) (Wales) (Scotland) (Republic of Ireland) (Netherlands) 1999	Did not qualify							
(South Africa) 2003	Did not qualify							
(Cricket West Indies) 2007	Did not qualify							
(India) (Sri Lanka) (Bangladesh) 2011	Did not qualify							
(Australia) (New Zealand) 2015	Did not qualify							
(England) (Wales) 2019	Did not qualify							
(India) 2023	Did not qualify							
(South Africa) (Zimbabwe) (Namibia) 2027	TBD							
(India) (Bangladesh) 2031	TBD							
Total	0 medals	0/13		0	0	0	0	0

=== ICC T20 World Cup ===
Men's T20 World Cup records
Year	Round	Position	GP	W	L	T	NR	Win%
(South Africa) 2007	Did not qualify							
(England) 2009	Did not qualify							
(Cricket West Indies) 2010	Did not qualify							
(Sri Lanka) 2012	Did not qualify							
(Bangladesh) 2014	Did not qualify							
(India) 2016	Did not qualify							
(United Arab Emirates) 2021	Did not qualify							
(Australia) 2022	Did not qualify							
(United States) (Cricket West Indies) 2024	Did not qualify							
(India) (Sri Lanka) 2026	Did not qualify							
(Australia) (New Zealand) 2028	TBD							
(England) (Wales) (Republic of Ireland) (Scotland) 2030	TBD							
Total	0 medals	0/10		0	0	0	0	0

=== ICC Twenty20 World Cup Qualifiers ===
Men's T20 World Cup Qualifier records
Year	Round	Position	GP	W	L	T	NR
(Ireland) 2008	Did not qualify						
(United Arab Emirates) 2010	Did not qualify						
(United Arab Emirates) 2012	Did not qualify						
(United Arab Emirates) 2013	Did not qualify						
(Ireland) (Scotland) 2015	Did not qualify						
(United Arab Emirates) 2019	Did not qualify						
(Oman) 2022	7th place (DNQ)	7/8	5	1	4	0	0
Total	1/7	0 Title	5	1	4	0	0

=== ICC Twenty20 World Cup Europe Regional Final ===
ICC T20 World Cup Europe Regional Final (Note: Regional Final of the ICC Europe region is the final stage of qualification for T20 World Cup from 2023 edition.) records
Year	Round	Position	GP	W	L	T	NR
(Guernsey) 2019	Runners-up	2/6	5	4	1	0	0
(Jersey) 2021	Runners-up	2/4	6	3	3	0	0
(Scotland) 2023	Round-robin	5/7	6	2	3	0	1
(Netherlands) 2025	Did not qualify						
Total	3/4	0 Title	17	9	7	0	1

=== European Cricket Championship ===
European Cricket Championship records
Host/Year	Round	Position	GP	W	L	T	NR
(Denmark) 1996	Did not participate						
(Netherlands) 1998	Round-robin	10/10	4	1	3	0	0
Total	1/8	0 Titles	4	1	3	0	1

=== European Cricket Championship Division Two ===
European Cricket Championship Division Two records
Host/Year	Round	Position	GP	W	L	T	NR
(Scotland) 2000	Runners-up	2/6	5	4	1	0	0
(Austria) 2002	Runners-up	2/6	5	4	1	0	0
(Belgium) 2004	3rd-place	3/6	5	3	2	0	0
(Scotland) 2006	3rd-place	3/6	3	1	2	0	0
(Guernsey) 2008	5th-place	5/6	5	1	4	0	0
(Guernsey) 2010	Did not participate						
(Netherlands) (Belgium) 2011	Did not participate						
(Greece) 2012	Did not participate						
(England) 2014	Did not participate						
(Sweden) 2016	Did not participate						
Total	5/11	0 Titles	23	10	0	0	0

=== Other tournaments ===
World Cricket League (List A)	ICC Trophy (One-day)	T20 World Cup Europe Sub-regional Qualifiers (T20I)
2008: 7th place (Division Five); 2010: 2nd place (Division Eight); 2011: 3rd place (Division Seven); 2013: 6th place (Division Seven); 2017: 5th place (Division Five)	1979 to 1990 inclusive: Not eligible – not an ICC member; 1994: Not eligible – ICC affiliate member; 1997: Not eligible – ICC affiliate member; 2001: First round	2019: Runners-up (Advanced to regional final); 2023: DNP (qualified for regional final directly); 2024: 3rd place

== Current squad ==
Updated as of 3 July 2025

This lists all the players who were part of the German squad for 2025 Malawi Quad Nations T20 Cup.

Name	Age	Batting style	Bowling style	Last T20I	Notes
Batters
Harmanjot Singh	32	Right-handed	Right-arm leg break	(Malawi) 2025	Captain
Hassan Khan	24	Left-handed	Right-arm off break	(Malawi) 2025	
Sachin Mandy	35	Right-handed	Right-arm medium	(Malawi) 2025	
All-rounders
Shahid Afridi	27	Right-handed	Right-arm medium	(Malawi) 2025	
Fayaz Khan	29	Right-handed	Right-arm medium	(Malawi) 2025	
Mussadiq Ahmed	37	Right-handed	Right-arm fast	(Malawi) 2025	
Muslim Yar	27	Right-handed	Slow left-arm orthodox	(Malawi) 2025	
Wicket-keeper
Kyle Klasse	24	Right-handed	—N/a	(Tanzania) 2025	
Spin Bowlers
Abdul Shakoor	27	Right-handed	Right-arm off break	(Belgium) 2023	
Ghulam Ahmadi	29	Right-handed	Right-arm off break	(Malawi) 2025	
Jatinder Kumar	34	Left-handed	Slow left-arm orthodox	(Malawi) 2025	
Pace Bowlers
Abdul Bashir	28	Right-handed	Right-arm medium	(Malawi) 2025	
Adil Khan	22	Right-handed	Right-arm medium	(Tanzania) 2025	
Sajid Liaqat	41	Right-handed	Right-arm medium	(Malawi) 2025	

== Coaching staff ==
Position	Name
Head coach	Atiq-uz-Zaman
Assistant Coach	Steven Knox
National Development Manager	Daniel Weston
Physiotherapist	Lukas Müller
Strength & Conditioning Coach	Tobias Kramer
Analyst	Felix Schneider

== International grounds ==
Locations of all stadiums which have hosted an international cricket match within Germany

Ground	City	State	Capacity	Matches hosted	Notes
Bayer Uerdingen Cricket Ground	Krefeld	North Rhine-Westphalia	2,000	T20Is, ICC qualifiers	Main international venue; hosted ICC Men's T20 World Cup Europe Qualifiers
National Performance Centre, Krefeld	Krefeld	North Rhine-Westphalia	1,500	T20Is	High-performance centre and alternate national ground
Rudi-Stephan-Gymnasium Ground	Mainz	Rhineland-Palatinate	1,000	Youth, dev matches	Occasionally used for development-level internationals

== Records and statistics ==
International Match Summary — Germany

Last updated 21 August 2026

Playing Record
Format	M	W	L	T	NR	Inaugural Match
Twenty20 Internationals	79	49	30	0	0	11 May 2019

=== Twenty20 International ===
- Germany's highest score: 308/1 v. Austria on 1 May 2026 at Bayer Uerdingen Cricket Ground, Krefeld.
- Highest individual score: 133*, Ben Kohler-Cadmore v. Austria on 1 May 2026 at Bayer Uerdingen Cricket Ground, Krefeld.
- Best bowling figures in an innings: 5/19, Fayaz Khan v. Norway on 11 July 2024 at Bayer Uerdingen Cricket Ground, Krefeld.

Most T20I runs for Germany

Player	Runs	Average	Career span
Harmanjot Singh	1,166	28.43	2019–2026
Musaddiq Ahmed	747	29.88	2024–2026
Joshua van Heerden	591	42.21	2022–2026
Venkatraman Ganesan	577	18.61	2019–2024
Vijayshankar Chikkannaiah	575	23.00	2019–2023

Most T20I wickets for Germany

Player	Wicket	Average	Career span
Muslim Yar	78	17.48	2019–2026
Ghulam Ahmadi	59	20.18	2021–2026
Elam Bharathi	46	14.60	2020–2023
Shahid Afridi	31	17.12	2023–2026
Sajid Liaqat	31	24.51	2019–2026

T20I record versus other nations

Records complete to T20I #4093. Last updated 21 August 2026.

Opponent	M	W	L	T	NR	First match	First win
vs Full Members
Ireland	1	0	1	0	0	21 February 2022	
vs Associate Members
Austria	11	9	2	0	0	9 June 2022	9 June 2022
Bahrain	2	0	2	0	0	18 February 2022	
Belgium	7	7	0	0	0	11 May 2019	11 May 2019
Canada	1	0	1	0	0	22 February 2022	
Croatia	1	1	0	0	0	14 July 2024	14 July 2024
Czech Republic	1	1	0	0	0	14 August 2026	14 August 2026
Denmark	8	5	3	0	0	19 June 2019	19 June 2019
Finland	2	2	0	0	0	11 August 2026	11 August 2026
France	2	2	0	0	0	6 August 2021	6 August 2021
Gibraltar	1	1	0	0	0	8 July 2024	8 July 2024
Greece	1	1	0	0	0	18 August 2026	18 August 2026
Guernsey	4	2	2	0	0	15 June 2019	15 June 2019
Israel	1	1	0	0	0	17 August 2026	17 August 2026
Italy	8	3	5	0	0	25 May 2019	17 October 2021
Jersey	4	1	3	0	0	20 June 2019	20 June 2019
Malawi	3	2	1	0	0	5 July 2025	5 July 2025
Norway	5	3	2	0	0	20 June 2019	20 June 2019
Philippines	1	1	0	0	0	24 February 2022	24 February 2022
Portugal	1	0	1	0	0	15 August 2026	
Scotland	1	0	1	0	0	20 July 2023	
Spain	7	3	4	0	0	8 March 2020	8 March 2020
Sweden	3	3	0	0	0	9 June 2022	9 June 2022
Tanzania	2	1	1	0	0	7 July 2025	7 July 2025
United Arab Emirates	1	0	1	0	0	19 February 2022	

== See also ==
- List of Germany Twenty20 International cricketers
