= Rwandan cricket team in Tanzania in 2022–23 =

International cricket tour

	Tanzania	Rwanda
- Dates: 31 October – 6 November 2022
Captains	Abhik Patwa (Note: Kassim Nassoro captained Tanzania in the 50-over match and the second T20I.)	Clinton Rubagumya (Note: Kevin Irakoze captained Rwanda in the 50-over match and the fifth T20I.)

Twenty20 International series
- Results: Tanzania won the 5-match series 5–0
Most runs	Ivan Selemani (117)	Orchide Tuyisenge (99)
Most wickets	Yalinde Nkanya (9)	Kevin Irakoze (7)
- Player of the series: Ally Kimote (Tan)

The Rwandan men's cricket team toured Tanzania in October and November 2022 to play a five-match Twenty20 International (T20I) series and a 50-over match against the hosts Tanzania. The series was part of both teams' preparation before they participated in the 2022–23 ICC Men's T20 World Cup Africa Qualifier in Rwanda later in November. Tanzania, captained by Abhik Patwa, won the five-match series 5-0, securing victory in each of the matches with ease.

== Squads ==
Tanzania	Rwanda
Abhik Patwa (c); Kassim Nassoro (vc); Abduramani Akida; Akhil Anil; Harsheed Chohan; Jatinkumar Darji; Mohamed Issa; Abdallah Jabiri (wk); Salum Jumbe; Ally Kimote; Riziki Kiseto; Omary Kitunda (wk); Yalinde Nkanya; Johnson Nyambo; Amal Rajeevan (wk); Ivan Selemani; Jitin Singh; SanjayKumar Thakor	Clinton Rubagumya (c); Martin Akayezu; Zappy Bimenyimana; Eric Dusingizimana; Jean Hakizimana; Kevin Irakoze; Eric Kubwimana; Oscar Manishimwe (wk); Yvan Mitari; Aime Mucyodusenge (wk); Didier Ndikubwimana (wk); Wilson Niyitanga; Ignace Ntirenganya; Emmanuel Sebareme; Orchide Tuyisenge

== T20I series ==
=== 1st T20I ===
31 October 2022
09:30
Scorecard

Tanzania; 137 (19.2 overs)	v	Rwanda; 83 (18.2 overs)
Ally Kimote 32 (21); Kevin Irakoze 3/15 (4 overs)		Orchide Tuyisenge 22 (18); Akhil Anil 3/15 (4 overs)

Tanzania won by 54 runs
Annadil Burhani Ground, Dar es Salaam
Umpires: Hozaiph Bhalloo (Tan) and Isaac Oyieko (Ken)
Player of the match: Ally Kimote (Tan)

- Rwanda won the toss and elected to field.
- Jean Hakizimana, Eric Kubwimana, Oscar Manishimwe and Ignace Ntirenganya (Rwa) all made their T20I debuts.

=== 2nd T20I ===
1 November 2022
09:30
Scorecard

Tanzania; 130/6 (20 overs)	v	Rwanda; 109/6 (20 overs)
Ivan Selemani 33 (23); Eric Kubwimana 2/22 (3 overs)		Clinton Rubagumya 28 (33); Yalinde Nkanya 3/9 (4 overs)

Tanzania won by 21 runs
Annadil Burhani Ground, Dar es Salaam
Umpires: Charles Kariuki (Ken) and Isaac Oyieko (Ken)
Player of the match: Yalinde Nkanya (Tan)

- Tanzania won the toss and elected to bat.
- Abdallah Jabiri (Tan) made his T20I debut.

=== 3rd T20I ===
4 November 2022
09:00
Scorecard

Tanzania; 168/9 (20 overs)	v	Rwanda; 91/5 (20 overs)
SanjayKumar Thakor 42 (16); Martin Akayezu 3/44 (4 overs)		Emmanuel Sebareme 32* (28); Salum Jumbe 2/11 (3 overs)

Tanzania won by 77 runs
Annadil Burhani Ground, Dar es Salaam
Umpires: Charles Kariuki (Ken) and Isaac Oyieko (Ken)
Player of the match: SanjayKumar Thakor (Tan)

- Tanzania won the toss and elected to bat.

=== 4th T20I ===
5 November 2022
14:00
Scorecard

Rwanda; 96 (18.3 overs)	v	Tanzania; 97/7 (18 overs)
Wilson Niyitanga 18 (17); Yalinde Nkanya 3/11 (2.3 overs)		Abhik Patwa 28 (29); Clinton Rubagumya 3/14 (4 overs)

Tanzania won by 3 wickets
Annadil Burhani Ground, Dar es Salaam
Umpires: Charles Kariuki (Ken) and Isaac Oyieko (Ken)
Player of the match: Yalinde Nkanya (Tan)

- Rwanda won the toss and elected to bat.

=== 5th T20I ===
6 November 2022
14:00
Scorecard

Rwanda; 83 (19.1 overs)	v	Tanzania; 84/0 (7.1 overs)
Orchide Tuyisenge 42 (52); SanjayKumar Thakor 3/10 (4 overs)		Ivan Selemani 44* (23)

Tanzania won by 10 wickets
Annadil Burhani Ground, Dar es Salaam
Umpires: Charles Kariuki (Ken) and Adil Kassam (Tan)
Player of the match: Ivan Selemani (Tan)

- Rwanda won the toss and elected to bat.
- Aime Mucyodusenge (Rwa) made his T20I debut.

== 50-over match ==
2 November 2022
09:00
Scorecard

Tanzania; 314/7 (50 overs)	v	Rwanda; 243 (47.3 overs)
Omary Kitunda 89 (80); Yvan Mitari 3/59 (8 overs)		Aime Mucyodusenge 83* (93); Johnson Nyambo 3/50 (10 overs)

Tanzania won by 71 runs
Annadil Burhani Ground, Dar es Salaam
Player of the match: Aime Mucyodusenge (Rwa)

- Tanzania won the toss and elected to bat.
