= 2023 East Africa T20 Cup =

International cricket tournament

- Date: 20–31 August 2023
- Location: Rwanda
- Result: Uganda won the series
- Player of the series: (Uganda) Kenneth Waiswa
Teams
Rwanda	Tanzania	Uganda
Captains
Clinton Rubagumya (Note: Didier Ndikubwimana captained Rwanda in the third match of the series.)	Abhik Patwa	Brian Masaba (Note: Kenneth Waiswa captained Uganda in the fourteenth and seventeenth matches of the series.)
Most runs
Eric Dusingizimana (188)	Amal Rajeevan (363)	Simon Ssesazi (337)
Most wickets
Zappy Bimenyimana (14)	Salum Jumbe (15)	Alpesh Ramjani (25)

The 2023 East Africa T20 Cup was a Twenty20 International (T20I) cricket tournament that took place in Rwanda in August 2023. The venue for the series was the Gahanga International Cricket Stadium in Kigali.

The participating teams were the hosts Rwanda along with Tanzania and Uganda. Ghana were originally scheduled to participate, but withdrew before the start of the tournament. Uganda, the defending champions, having won the 2022 tournament, also achieved victory in the 2023 tournament, with eleven wins in twelve matches. Uganda's only defeat in the tournament was against Tanzania on 21 August 2023. They bounced back by defeating Tanzania four times in the remainder of the tournament.

== Squads ==
Rwanda	Tanzania	Uganda
Clinton Rubagumya (c); Martin Akayezu; Zappy Bimenyimana; Eric Dusingizimana; Jean Iradukunda; Kevin Irakoze; Eric Kubwimana; Oscar Manishimwe (wk); Israel Mugisha; Didier Ndikubwimana (wk); Wilson Niyitanga; Eric Niyomugabo; Ignace Ntirenganya; Emile Rukiriza; Emmanuel Sebareme; Orchide Tuyisenge	Abhik Patwa (c); Kassim Nassoro (vc); Shaik Basha; Mohamed Issa; Salum Jumbe; Ally Kimote; Omary Kitunda (wk); Dhrumit Mehta; Yalinde Nkanya; Johnson Nyambo; Amal Rajeevan (wk); Ivan Selemani; Jitin Singh; SanjayKumar Thakor	Brian Masaba (c); Bilal Hassan; Cyrus Kakuru (wk); Ronald Lutaaya; Roger Mukasa (wk); Pascal Murungi; Siraje Nsubuga; Ronak Patel; Alpesh Ramjani; Jonathan Ssebanja; Henry Ssenyondo; Simon Ssesazi; David Wabwire; Kenneth Waiswa

== Points table ==
Pos	Team	Pld	W	L	NR	Pts	NRR
1	Uganda	12	11	1	0	22	2.272
2	Tanzania	12	6	6	0	12	−0.125
3	Rwanda	12	1	11	0	2	−2.163

Source: ESPNcricinfo

== Fixtures ==
20 August 2023
09:45
Scorecard

Uganda; 146/6 (20 overs)	v	Rwanda; 106 (15.4 overs)
Ronald Lutaaya 43 (38); Zappy Bimenyimana 2/32 (4 overs)		Eric Dusingizimana 50 (31); Kenneth Waiswa 3/28 (3 overs)

Uganda won by 40 runs
Gahanga International Cricket Stadium, Kigali
Umpires: Norbert Abii (Uga) and Gaston Niyibizi (Rwa)
Player of the match: Kenneth Waiswa (Uga)

- Uganda won the toss and elected to bat.
- Kenneth Waiswa (Uga) took his first hat-trick in T20Is.

20 August 2023
13:45
Scorecard

Tanzania; 143/8 (20 overs)	v	Uganda; 146/4 (18.2 overs)
Abhik Patwa 42 (37); Kenneth Waiswa 4/29 (4 overs)		Simon Ssesazi 50 (35); SanjayKumar Thakor 2/33 (4 overs)

Uganda won by 6 wickets
Gahanga International Cricket Stadium, Kigali
Umpires: Veronique Iriho (Rwa) and Gaston Niyibizi (Rwa)
Player of the match: Kenneth Waiswa (Uga)

- Tanzania won the toss and elected to bat.

21 August 2023
09:45
Scorecard

Tanzania; 170/5 (20 overs)	v	Rwanda; 174/3 (18.5 overs)
Amal Rajeevan 57 (48); Zappy Bimenyimana 2/31 (4 overs)		Didier Ndikubwimana 69 (46); Kassim Nassoro 1/24 (2.5 overs)

Rwanda won by 7 wickets
Gahanga International Cricket Stadium, Kigali
Umpires: Jean Siboniyo (Rwa) and Vicky Prajapati (Rwa)
Player of the match: Didier Ndikubwimana (Rwa)

- Rwanda won the toss and elected to field.
- Israel Mugisha (Rwa) and Shaik Basha (Tan) both made their T20I debuts.

21 August 2023
13:45
Scorecard

Uganda; 176/6 (20 overs)	v	Tanzania; 180/7 (20 overs)
Ronak Patel 61* (42); Mohamed Issa 3/24 (4 overs)		Ivan Selemani 59 (29); Alpesh Ramjani 3/18 (4 overs)

Tanzania won by 3 wickets
Gahanga International Cricket Stadium, Kigali
Umpires: Eric Dusabemungu (Rwa) and Vicky Prajapati (Rwa)
Player of the match: Ivan Selemani (Rwa)

- Uganda won the toss and elected to bat.
- David Wabwire (Uga) made his T20I debut.

22 August 2023
09:45
Scorecard

Uganda; 186 (20 overs)	v	Rwanda; 125 (15.3 overs)
Alpesh Ramjani 45 (28); Zappy Bimenyimana 3/29 (4 overs)		Clinton Rubagumya 40 (32); Alpesh Ramjani 4/9 (3 overs)

Uganda won by 61 runs
Gahanga International Cricket Stadium, Kigali
Umpires: Norbert Abii (Uga) and Veronique Iriho (Rwa)
Player of the match: Alpesh Ramjani (Uga)

- Rwanda won the toss and elected to field.

22 August 2023
13:45
Scorecard

Rwanda; 154/6 (20 overs)	v	Tanzania; 155/3 (16 overs)
Didier Ndikubwimana 52 (47); Ally Kimote 2/17 (3 overs)		Abhik Patwa 58 (34); Emile Rukiriza 2/27 (4 overs)

Tanzania won by 7 wickets
Gahanga International Cricket Stadium, Kigali
Umpires: Norbert Abii (Uga) and Gaston Niyibizi (Rwa)
Player of the match: Abhik Patwa (Tan)

- Tanzania won the toss and elected to field.

24 August 2023
09:45
Scorecard

Uganda; 192/6 (20 overs)	v	Rwanda; 106 (14.1 overs)
Roger Mukasa 89 (51); Clinton Rubagumya 2/37 (4 overs)		Orchide Tuyisenge 40 (27); Alpesh Ramjani 3/20 (4 overs)

Uganda won by 86 runs
Gahanga International Cricket Stadium, Kigali
Umpires: Eric Dusabemungu (Rwa) and Vicky Prajapati (Rwa)
Player of the match: Roger Mukasa (Uga)

- Rwanda won the toss and elected to field.

24 August 2023
13:45
Scorecard

Uganda; 171/5 (20 overs)	v	Tanzania; 111 (16.5 overs)
Kenneth Waiswa 66* (35); Salum Jumbe 2/33 (4 overs)		Amal Rajeevan 37 (29); Kenneth Waiswa 3/19 (3 overs)

Uganda won by 60 runs
Gahanga International Cricket Stadium, Kigali
Umpires: Eric Dusabemungu (Rwa) and Jean Siboniyo (Rwa)
Player of the match: Kenneth Waiswa (Uga)

- Tanzania won the toss and elected to field.

25 August 2023
09:45
Scorecard

Rwanda; 133/9 (20 overs)	v	Tanzania; 134/9 (19.4 overs)
Wilson Niyitanga 33 (35); Mohamed Issa 3/24 (4 overs)		SanjayKumar Thakor 44 (19); Zappy Bimenyimana 3/7 (4 overs)

Tanzania won by 1 wicket
Gahanga International Cricket Stadium, Kigali
Umpires: Norbert Abii (Uga) and Veronique Iriho (Rwa)
Player of the match: Mohamed Issa (Tan)

- Tanzania won the toss and elected to field.

25 August 2023
13:45
Scorecard

Uganda; 161/9 (20 overs)	v	Tanzania; 142/6 (20 overs)
Alpesh Ramjani 55 (41); Salum Jumbe 3/24 (4 overs)		Amal Rajeevan 50 (37); Kenneth Waiswa 2/21 (4 overs)

Uganda won by 19 runs
Gahanga International Cricket Stadium, Kigali
Umpires: Veronique Iriho (Rwa) and Gaston Niyibizi (Rwa)
Player of the match: Alpesh Ramjani (Uga)

- Uganda won the toss and elected to bat.
- Pascal Murungi (Uga) replaced Ronak Patel as a concussion substitute after 4.3 overs of the first innings.

27 August 2023
09:45
Scorecard

Tanzania; 152/7 (20 overs)	v	Rwanda; 143/8 (20 overs)
Abhik Patwa 54 (43); Martin Akayezu 2/26 (4 overs)		Martin Akayezu 32 (16); Salum Jumbe 3/22 (4 overs)

Tanzania won by 9 runs
Gahanga International Cricket Stadium, Kigali
Umpires: Vicky Prajapati (Rwa) and Jean Siboniyo (Rwa)
Player of the match: Salum Jumbe (Tan)

- Rwanda won the toss and elected to field.

27 August 2023
13:45
Scorecard

Rwanda; 126/7 (20 overs)	v	Uganda; 127/4 (16.5 overs)
Clinton Rubagumya 28 (39); Alpesh Ramjani 2/28 (4 overs)		Alpesh Ramjani 39* (22); Israel Mugisha 2/22 (4 overs)

Uganda won by 6 wickets
Gahanga International Cricket Stadium, Kigali
Umpires: Gaston Niyibizi (Rwa) and Jean Siboniyo (Rwa)
Player of the match: Alpesh Ramjani (Uga)

- Rwanda won the toss and elected to bat.

28 August 2023
09:45
Scorecard

Uganda; 180/6 (20 overs)	v	Tanzania; 121 (18.2 overs)
Ronak Patel 37 (23); Mohamed Issa 2/17 (3 overs)		Shaik Basha 43 (23); Jonathan Ssebanja 3/17 (4 overs)

Uganda won by 59 runs
Gahanga International Cricket Stadium, Kigali
Umpires: Eric Dusabemungu (Rwa) and Veronique Iriho (Rwa)
Player of the match: Alpesh Ramjani (Uga)

- Uganda won the toss and elected to bat.

28 August 2023
13:45
Scorecard

Rwanda; 110/6 (20 overs)	v	Uganda; 114/2 (8.5 overs)
Zappy Bimenyimana 30 (20); Alpesh Ramjani 2/13 (4 overs)		Roger Mukasa 45 (22); Emmanuel Sebareme 2/23 (2 overs)

Uganda won by 8 wickets
Gahanga International Cricket Stadium, Kigali
Umpires: Norbert Abii (Uga) and Eric Dusabemungu (Rwa)
Player of the match: Roger Mukasa (Uga)

- Rwanda won the toss and elected to bat.
- Jean Iradukunda (Rwa) made his T20I debut.

30 August 2023
09:45
Scorecard

Uganda; 141 (19 overs)	v	Tanzania; 122 (19.1 overs)
Ronak Patel 45 (31); Ally Kimote 3/7 (3 overs)		Mohamed Issa 33* (21); Brian Masaba 3/8 (2 overs)

Uganda won by 19 runs
Gahanga International Cricket Stadium, Kigali
Umpires: Gaston Niyibizi (Rwa) and Jean Siboniyo (Rwa)
Player of the match: Brian Masaba (Uga)

- Tanzania won the toss and elected to field.

30 August 2023
13:45
Scorecard

Tanzania; 157/7 (20 overs)	v	Rwanda; 98 (13.4 overs)
Ivan Selemani 34 (29); Emile Rukiriza 2/28 (4 overs)		Kevin Irakoze 24 (17); Yalinde Nkanya 3/25 (3 overs)

Tanzania won by 59 runs
Gahanga International Cricket Stadium, Kigali
Umpires: Gaston Niyibizi (Rwa) and Vicky Prajapati (Rwa)
Player of the match: Mohamed Issa (Tan)

- Rwanda won the toss and elected to field.

31 August 2023
09:45
Scorecard

Rwanda; 131 (18.4 overs)	v	Uganda; 133/2 (13.2 overs)
Clinton Rubagumya 32 (36); Alpesh Ramjani 3/15 (4 overs)		Simon Ssesazi 59* (40); Clinton Rubagumya 1/11 (2 overs)

Uganda won by 8 wickets
Gahanga International Cricket Stadium, Kigali
Umpires: Norbert Abii (Uga) and Eric Dusabemungu (Rwa)
Player of the match: Simon Ssesazi (Uga)

- Rwanda won the toss and elected to bat.

31 August 2023
13:45
Scorecard

Tanzania; 179/6 (20 overs)	v	Rwanda; 130 (15.4 overs)
Amal Rajeevan 63 (49); Martin Akayezu 3/45 (4 overs)		Eric Dusingizimana 46 (25); Yalinde Nkanya 4/25 (4 overs)

Tanzania won by 49 runs
Gahanga International Cricket Stadium, Kigali
Umpires: Norbert Abii (Uga) and Veronique Iriho (Rwa)
Player of the match: Yalinde Nkanya (Tan)

- Tanzania won the toss and elected to bat.
