= 2022 East Africa T20 Series =

International cricket tournament

- Date: 13–23 December 2022
- Location: Rwanda
- Result: Uganda won the tournament
- Player of the series: (Uganda) Frank Nsubuga
Teams
Rwanda	Tanzania	Uganda
Captains
Clinton Rubagumya (Note: Kevin Irakoze captained Rwanda in the seventh and eighth matches of the series.)	Abhik Patwa (Note: Kassim Nassoro captained Tanzania in their last nine matches of the series.)	Brian Masaba (Note: Kenneth Waiswa captained Uganda in the fifth match of the series.)
Most runs
Orchide Tuyisenge (245)	Ivan Selemani (260)	Simon Ssesazi (304)
Most wickets
Kevin Irakoze (15)	Salum Jumbe (17)	Henry Ssenyondo (18)

The 2022 East Africa T20 Series was a Twenty20 International (T20I) cricket tournament, that took place in Rwanda in December 2022. The venue for the series was the Gahanga International Cricket Stadium in Kigali. The participating teams were originally planned to be the hosts Rwanda along with Kenya, Tanzania and Uganda, with the tournament to be played as a triple round-robin. However, Kenya withdrew shortly before the tournament, and the format was changed so that each team would play each other six times in a round-robin. Uganda won the tournament after defeating Tanzania on the penultimate day of the event. Overall, out of 12 matches for each side, Uganda won nine matches and Tanzania six; Rwanda's solitary win came in a rain-shortened match against Tanzania.

== Squads ==
Rwanda	Tanzania	Uganda
Clinton Rubagumya (c); Martin Akayezu; Zappy Bimenyimana; Eric Dusingizimana; Kevin Irakoze; Eric Kubwimana; Oscar Manishimwe (wk); Yvan Mitari; Aime Mucyodusenge; Didier Ndikubwimana (wk); Wilson Niyitanga; Eric Niyomugabo; Ignace Ntirenganya; Emmanuel Sebareme; Orchide Tuyisenge	Abhik Patwa (c); Akhil Anil; Abduramani Hussein; Mohamed Issa; Abdallah Jabiri; Salum Jumbe; Ally Kimote; Riziki Kiseto; Omary Kitunda (wk); Dhrumit Mehta; Kassim Nassoro; Yalinde Nkanya; Johnson Nyambo; Amal Rajeevan (wk); Ivan Selemani; SanjayKumar Thakor	Brian Masaba (c); Joseph Baguma; Emmanuel Hasahya; Bilal Hassan; Cyrus Kakuru (wk); Cosmas Kyewuta; Ronald Lutaaya; Juma Miyagi; Roger Mukasa (wk); Pascal Murungi; Frank Nsubuga; Alpesh Ramjani; Henry Ssenyondo; Simon Ssesazi; Kenneth Waiswa

== Points table ==
Pos	Team	Pld	W	L	NR	Pts	NRR
1	Uganda	12	9	1	2	20	2.731
2	Tanzania	12	6	4	2	14	0.956
3	Rwanda	12	1	11	0	2	−3.155

Source: ESPNcricinfo

== Fixtures ==
13 December 2022
09:30
Scorecard

Tanzania; 147/4 (13 overs)	v	Rwanda; 81/4 (13 overs)
Abhik Patwa 68 (37); Yvan Mitari 3/39 (3 overs)		Wilson Niyitanga 37* (34); Yalinde Nkanya 2/8 (3 overs)

Tanzania won by 66 runs
Gahanga International Cricket Stadium, Kigali
Umpires: Patric Makumbi (Uga) and Itangishaka Olivier (Rwa)
Player of the match: Amal Rajeevan (Tan)

- Rwanda won the toss and elected to field.
- The match was reduced to 13 overs per side due to rain.

13 December 2022
13:45
Scorecard

Rwanda; 110/6 (15 overs)	v	Tanzania; 114/5 (14.1 overs)
Eric Dusingizimana 29 (30); SanjayKumar Thakor 2/21 (3 overs)		Abhik Patwa 45 (30); Clinton Rubagumya 2/21 (3 overs)

Tanzania won by 5 wickets (DLS method)
Gahanga International Cricket Stadium, Kigali
Umpires: Eric Dusabemungu (Rwa) and John Mayeku (Uga)
Player of the match: Abhik Patwa (Tan)

- Tanzania won the toss and elected to field.
- Tanzania were set a revised target of 111 runs in 15 overs due to rain.

14 December 2022
09:30
Scorecard

Uganda; 185/9 (20 overs)	v	Rwanda; 100 (16.1 overs)
Ronald Lutaaya 70 (40); Kevin Irakoze 3/21 (4 overs)		Orchide Tuyisenge 66 (41); Joseph Baguma 4/14 (4 overs)

Uganda won by 85 runs
Gahanga International Cricket Stadium, Kigali
Umpires: Eric Dusabemungu (Rwa) and Patric Makumbi (Uga)
Player of the match: Joseph Baguma (Uga)

- Rwanda won the toss and elected to field.
- Cyrus Kakuru and Ronald Lutaaya (Uga) both made their T20I debuts.

14 December 2022
13:45
Scorecard

Tanzania; 48/9 (15.2 overs)	v	Uganda
Abdallah Jabiri 9 (14); Juma Miyagi 3/12 (3 overs)

No result
Gahanga International Cricket Stadium, Kigali
Umpires: John Mayeku (Uga) and Itangishaka Olivier (Rwa)

- Tanzania won the toss and elected to bat.
- No further play was possible due to rain.

15 December 2022
09:30
Scorecard

Uganda; 168/9 (20 overs)	v	Rwanda; 35 (11.2 overs)
Simon Ssesazi 35 (23); Eric Niyomugabo 3/32 (4 overs)		Kevin Irakoze 14 (14); Bilal Hassan 3/4 (3 overs)

Uganda won by 133 runs
Gahanga International Cricket Stadium, Kigali
Umpires: John Mayeku (Uga) and Itangishaka Olivier (Rwa)
Player of the match: Bilal Hassan (Uga)

- Uganda won the toss and elected to bat.
- Emmanuel Hasahya (Uga) made his T20I debut.

15 December 2022
13:45
Scorecard

Uganda; 169/8 (20 overs)	v	Tanzania; 156/9 (20 overs)
Roger Mukasa 89 (62); Akhil Anil 3/31 (4 overs)		Ivan Selemani 47 (30); Joseph Baguma 2/23 (4 overs); Frank Nsubuga 2/23 (4 overs)

Uganda won by 13 runs
Gahanga International Cricket Stadium, Kigali
Umpires: Eric Dusabemungu (Rwa) and Patric Makumbi (Uga)
Player of the match: Roger Mukasa (Uga)

- Tanzania won the toss and elected to field.
- Abduramani Hussein (Tan) made his T20I debut.

16 December 2022
09:30
Scorecard

Uganda; 153/7 (20 overs)	v	Rwanda; 56 (15.2 overs)
Simon Ssesazi 55 (47); Emmanuel Sebareme 3/23 (4 overs)		Orchide Tuyisenge 29 (24); Henry Ssenyondo 4/7 (4 overs)

Uganda won by 97 runs
Gahanga International Cricket Stadium, Kigali
Umpires: John Mayeku (Uga) and Itangishaka Olivier (Rwa)
Player of the match: Henry Ssenyondo (Uga)

- Rwanda won the toss and elected to field.

16 December 2022
13:45
Scorecard

Rwanda; 128/7 (15 overs)	v	Tanzania; 131/8 (15 overs)
Wilson Niyitanga 55* (37); Salum Jumbe 4/31 (3 overs)		Amal Rajeevan 25 (17); Zappy Bimenyimana 2/21 (3 overs)

Rwanda won by 1 run (DLS method)
Gahanga International Cricket Stadium, Kigali
Umpires: Eric Dusabemungu (Rwa) and Patric Makumbi (Uga)
Player of the match: Wilson Niyitanga (Rwa)

- Tanzania won the toss and elected to field.
- Tanzania were set a revised target of 133 runs in 15 overs due to rain.

18 December 2022
09:30
Scorecard

Uganda; 107/9 (15 overs)	v	Tanzania; 105/9 (15 overs)
Roger Mukasa 42 (30); Yalinde Nkanya 4/10 (3 overs)		Amal Rajeevan 50 (29); Cosmas Kyewuta 4/5 (3 overs)

Uganda won by 2 runs
Gahanga International Cricket Stadium, Kigali
Umpires: Patric Makumbi (Uga) and Itangishaka Olivier (Rwa)
Player of the match: Cosmas Kyewuta (Uga)

- Uganda won the toss and elected to bat.
- The match was reduced to 15 overs per side due to rain.

18 December 2022
13:45
Scorecard

Rwanda; 118/9 (20 overs)	v	Tanzania; 123/4 (14.5 overs)
Orchide Tuyisenge 53 (51); Salum Jumbe 3/16 (2 overs)		Ivan Selemani 29 (12); Clinton Rubagumya 1/7 (1 over)

Tanzania won by 6 wickets
Gahanga International Cricket Stadium, Kigali
Umpires: Eric Dusabemungu (Rwa) and John Mayeku (Uga)
Player of the match: Salum Jumbe (Tan)

- Rwanda won the toss and elected to bat.

19 December 2022
09:30
Scorecard

Uganda; 132 (17.4 overs)	v	Tanzania; 137/5 (19.1 overs)
Simon Ssesazi 36 (23); Salum Jumbe 4/24 (3.4 overs)		Ivan Selemani 29 (16); Joseph Baguma 2/13 (4 overs)

Tanzania won by 5 wickets
Gahanga International Cricket Stadium, Kigali
Umpires: John Mayeku (Uga) and Itangishaka Olivier (Rwa)
Player of the match: Salum Jumbe (Tan)

- Uganda won the toss and elected to bat.

19 December 2022
13:45
Scorecard

Rwanda; 57 (14.3 overs)	v	Uganda; 59/1 (5.5 overs)
Eric Dusingizimana 18 (22); Henry Ssenyondo 3/14 (4 overs)		Kenneth Waiswa 35* (21); Clinton Rubagumya 1/29 (2.5 overs)

Uganda won by 9 wickets
Gahanga International Cricket Stadium, Kigali
Umpires: Eric Dusabemungu (Rwa) and Patric Makumbi (Uga)
Player of the match: Henry Ssenyondo (Uga)

- Uganda won the toss and elected to field.

20 December 2022
09:30
Scorecard

Tanzania; 134/9 (20 overs)	v	Rwanda; 103 (19 overs)
Ivan Selemani 49 (35); Kevin Irakoze 4/20 (4 overs)		Eric Dusingizimana 32 (34); Yalinde Nkanya 3/7 (4 overs)

Tanzania won by 31 runs
Gahanga International Cricket Stadium, Kigali
Umpires: John Mayeku (Uga) and Itangishaka Olivier (Rwa)
Player of the match: Kassim Nassoro (Tan)

- Tanzania won the toss and elected to bat.

20 December 2022
13:45
Scorecard

Rwanda; 67 (17.3 overs)	v	Uganda; 68/3 (8.5 overs)
Orchide Tuyisenge 21 (30); Bilal Hassan 3/9 (3 overs)		Kenneth Waiswa 30 (25); Emmanuel Sebareme 1/9 (1.5 overs)

Uganda won by 7 wickets
Gahanga International Cricket Stadium, Kigali
Umpires: Eric Dusabemungu (Rwa) and Patric Makumbi (Uga)
Player of the match: Bilal Hassan (Uga)

- Uganda won the toss and elected to field.

22 December 2022
09:30
Scorecard

Tanzania; 136/9 (20 overs)	v	Rwanda; 108/9 (20 overs)
Salum Jumbe 34 (30); Clinton Rubagumya 2/24 (3 overs)		Eric Dusingizimana 40 (40); Ally Kimote 4/13 (3 overs)

Tanzania won by 28 runs
Gahanga International Cricket Stadium, Kigali
Umpires: Patric Makumbi (Uga) and John Mayeku (Uga)
Player of the match: Ally Kimote (Tan)

- Rwanda won the toss and elected to field.

22 December 2022
13:45
Scorecard

Uganda; 183/5 (20 overs)	v	Tanzania; 176 (19.4 overs)
Simon Ssesazi 100* (58); Yalinde Nkanya 2/29 (4 overs)		Ivan Selemani 39 (15); Bilal Hassan 3/22 (3.4 overs)

Uganda won by 7 runs
Gahanga International Cricket Stadium, Kigali
Umpires: Eric Dusabemungu (Rwa) and Itangishaka Olivier (Rwa)
Player of the match: Simon Ssesazi (Uga)

- Uganda won the toss and elected to bat.
- Dhrumit Mehta (Tan) made his T20I debut.
- Simon Ssesazi became the first player for Uganda to score a century in T20Is.

23 December 2022
09:30
Scorecard

Uganda; 108 (19.3 overs)	v	Rwanda; 105 (19.4 overs)
Juma Miyagi 21 (28); Martin Akayezu 3/27 (4 overs)		Orchide Tuyisenge 27 (29); Joseph Baguma 3/12 (4 overs)

Uganda won by 3 runs
Gahanga International Cricket Stadium, Kigali
Umpires: Eric Dusabemungu (Rwa) and Patric Makumbi (Uga)
Player of the match: Joseph Baguma (Uga)

- Rwanda won the toss and elected to field.

23 December 2022
13:45
Scorecard

Tanzania	v	Uganda

No result
Gahanga International Cricket Stadium, Kigali
Umpires: John Mayeku (Uga) and Itangishaka Olivier (Rwa)

- Tanzania won the toss and elected to bat.
- No play was possible due to rain.
