= 2026 Kwibuka Women's T20 Tournament =

International cricket tournament

- Dates: 10 – 20 June 2026
- Administrator: Rwanda Cricket Association
- Cricket format: Twenty20 International
- Tournament format(s): Double round-robin and play-offs
- Host: Rwanda
- Champions: Zimbabwe XI (1st title)
- Runners-up: Rwanda
- Participants: 5
- Matches: 22
- Most runs: (Zimbabwe) Nyasha Gwanzura (297)
- Most wickets: (Nigeria) Christabel Chukwuonye (17)

The 2026 Kwibuka Women's T20 Tournament was a Twenty20 International (T20I) cricket tournament that took place in Rwanda from 10–20 June 2026. The twelfth edition of the Kwibuka tournament commemorated the anniversary of the 1994 genocide against the Tutsi. The participating teams were Brazil, Malawi, Nigeria, Rwanda and a Zimbabwe High Performance XI. The 2025 champions, Tanzania, did not enter this year.

== Squads ==
Brazil	Malawi	Nigeria	Rwanda	Zimbabwe XI
Carolina Nascimento (c); Laura Cardoso (vc); Laura Agatha; Marianne Artur; Monnike Machado (wk); Lara Moisés; Evelyn Muller; Nicole Monteiro; Roberta Moretti Avery; Maria Ribeiro; Giulia Ribeiro; Ana Sabino; Maria Silva; Lindsay Vilas Boas (wk)	Euless Chiralile (c); Christina Bwanali; Princess Chidatha; Sophina Chinawe; Lidia Dimba; Sphiwe Frank; Sugeni Kananji; Bridget Kasinja; Alinafe Kawirawira; Angela Lumbe; Lucy Malino; Praise Maziya (wk); Vanessa Phiri; Lucy Wesley	Favour Eseigbe (c); Sarah Etim (vc, wk); Adeshola Adekunle; Deborah Bassey; Jessica Bieni; Christabel Chukwuonye; Favour Effiong; Omosigho Eguakun; Henrietta Mbam; Oseyande Omonkhobhio; Rachael Samson; Esther Sandy; Salome Sunday; Lillian Udeh	Marie Bimenyimana (c); Alice Ikuzwe; Georgette Ingabire; Flora Irakoze; Rosine Irera; Gisele Ishimwe; Henriette Ishimwe; Grace Mugwaneza; Belise Murekatete; Clarrisse Uwase; Geovanis Uwase; Merveille Uwase (wk); Fanny Utagushimaninde; Ruth Uwimana	Adel Zimunu (c); Olinder Chare; Kudzai Chigora; Nyasha Gwanzura; Lindokuhle Mabhera; Betty Mangachena; Lindrose Masina; Michelle Mavunga; Passionate Munorwei; Salem Museka; Vimbai Mutingwindu (wk); Kelly Ndiraya; Runyararo Pasipanodya; Lorraine Pemhiwa

== Round-robin ==
=== Points table ===
Pos	Team	Pld	W	L	NR	Pts	NRR	Qualification
1	Rwanda	8	6	2	0	12	1.422	Advanced to the final
2	Zimbabwe XI	8	6	2	0	12	1.268	Advanced to the final
3	Brazil	8	5	3	0	10	−0.318	Advanced to the third place play-off
4	Nigeria	8	3	5	0	6	0.357	Advanced to the third place play-off
5	Malawi	8	0	8	0	0	−2.773	

Source: ESPNcricinfo

=== Fixtures ===
10 June 2026
09:30
Scorecard

Rwanda; 139/6 (20 overs)	v	Zimbabwe XI; 140/7 (18.2 overs)
Belise Murekatete 54* (23); Olinder Chare 1/7 (1 over)		Runyararo Pasipanodya 40* (36); Henriette Ishimwe 2/8 (3 overs)

Zimbabwe XI won by 3 wickets
Gahanga International Cricket Stadium, Kigali
Umpires: Veronique Iriho (Rwa) and Remy Singizwa (Rwa)
Player of the match: Runyararo Pasipanodya (Zimbabwe XI)

- Zimbabwe XI won the toss and elected to field.

10 June 2026
09:30
Scorecard

Nigeria; 98/8 (20 overs)	v	Malawi; 46 (10.3 overs)
Jessica Bieni 25* (35); Lucy Malino 4/15 (4 overs)		Sugeni Kananji 16 (18); Adeshola Adekunle 3/15 (4 overs)

Nigeria won by 52 runs
Gahanga B Ground, Kigali
Umpires: Diane Dusabemungu (Rwa) and Gaston Niyibizi (Rwa)
Player of the match: Adeshola Adekunle (Nga)

- Malawi won the toss and elected to field.
- Sphiwe Frank (Mwi) and Jessica Bieni (Nga) both made their T20I debuts.

10 June 2026
13:30
Scorecard

Zimbabwe XI; 153/6 (20 overs)	v	Brazil; 106 (18.1 overs)
Nyasha Gwanzura 115 (60); Lara Moisés 2/16 (4 overs)		Laura Cardoso 48 (40); Kudzai Chigora 5/10 (3.1 overs)

Zimbabwe XI won by 47 runs
Gahanga International Cricket Stadium, Kigali
Umpires: Peju Adetoro (Nga) and Ange Igihozo (Rwa)
Player of the match: Nyasha Gwanzura (Zimbabwe XI)

- Zimbabwe XI won the toss and elected to bat.

11 June 2026
09:30
Scorecard

Nigeria; 111/6 (20 overs)	v	Brazil; 112/3 (18.2 overs)
Adeshola Adekunle 38 (44); Maria Ribeiro 3/31 (4 overs)		Lindsay Vilas Boas 35 (38); Christabel Chukwuonye 1/14 (4 overs)

Brazil won by 7 wickets
Gahanga International Cricket Stadium, Kigali
Umpires: Diane Dusabemungu (Rwa) and Ange Igihozo (Rwa)
Player of the match: Maria Ribeiro (Bra)

- Nigeria won the toss and elected to field.

11 June 2026
09:30
Scorecard

Rwanda; 174/6 (20 overs)	v	Malawi; 108/5 (20 overs)
Gisele Ishimwe 54 (44); Lucy Malino 2/34 (4 overs)		Sugeni Kananji 51 (41); Rosine Irera 1/12 (3 overs)

Rwanda won by 66 runs
Gahanga B Ground, Kigali
Umpires: Peju Adetoro (Nga) and Remy Singizwa (Rwa)
Player of the match: Gisele Ishimwe (Rwa)

- Malawi won the toss and elected to field.
- Grace Mugwaneza (Rwa) made her T20I debut.

11 June 2026
13:30
Scorecard

Zimbabwe XI; 107 (19 overs)	v	Nigeria; 108/3 (17.4 overs)
Nyasha Gwanzura 27 (23); Favour Eseigbe 3/17 (4 overs)		Salome Sunday 34* (39); Nyasha Gwanzura 1/18 (3 overs)

Nigeria won by 7 wickets
Gahanga International Cricket Stadium, Kigali
Umpires: Veronique Iriho (Rwa) and Gaston Niyibizi (Rwa)
Player of the match: Favour Eseigbe (Nga)

- Zimbabwe XI won the toss and elected to bat.

12 June 2026
09:30
Scorecard

Rwanda; 106 (19.5 overs)	v	Nigeria; 104/6 (20 overs)
Henriette Ishimwe 30* (21); Christabel Chukwuonye 3/14 (4 overs)		Esther Sandy 26 (33); Marie Bimenyimana 2/31 (4 overs)

Rwanda won by 2 runs
Gahanga International Cricket Stadium, Kigali
Umpires: Peju Adetoro (Nga) and Gaston Niyibizi (Rwa)
Player of the match: Marie Bimenyimana (Rwa)

- Rwanda won the toss and elected to bat.

12 June 2026
09:30
Scorecard

Brazil; 124/8 (20 overs)	v	Malawi; 82/9 (20 overs)
Laura Agatha 52 (43); Lidia Dimba 2/10 (3 overs)		Lidia Dimba 31 (31); Lara Moisés 2/9 (4 overs); Maria Ribeiro 2/9 (4 overs)

Brazil won by 42 runs
Gahanga B Ground, Kigali
Umpires: Diane Dusabemungu (Rwa) and Veronique Iriho (Rwa)
Player of the match: Maria Ribeiro (Bra)

- Malawi won the toss and elected to field.
- Alinafe Kawirawira (Mwi) made her T20I debut.

12 June 2026
13:30
Scorecard

Brazil; 98 (18.2 overs)	v	Zimbabwe XI; 102/7 (17.2 overs)
Laura Agatha 54 (54); Salem Museka 4/13 (4 overs)		Kelly Ndiraya 34 (23); Maria Ribeiro 2/20 (4 overs)

Zimbabwe XI won by 3 wickets
Gahanga International Cricket Stadium, Kigali
Umpires: Ange Igihozo (Rwa) and Remy Singizwa (Rwa)
Player of the match: Salem Museka (Zimbabwe XI)

- Zimbabwe XI won the toss and elected to field.

14 June 2026
09:30
Scorecard

Zimbabwe XI; 110 (19.2 overs)	v	Malawi; 83/5 (20 overs)
Nyasha Gwanzura 27 (36); Vanessa Phiri 3/25 (4 overs)		Sugeni Kananji 17 (11); Passionate Munorwei 1/9 (2 overs)

Zimbabwe XI won by 27 runs
Gahanga International Cricket Stadium, Kigali
Umpires: Peju Adetoro (Nga) and Forster Mutizwa (Zim)
Player of the match: Vanessa Phiri (Mwi)

- Zimbabwe XI won the toss and elected to bat.

14 June 2026
09:30
Scorecard

Rwanda; 179/6 (20 overs)	v	Brazil; 121 (19.3 overs)
Georgette Ingabire 45 (29); Carolina Nascimento 4/29 (4 overs)		Lindsay Vilas Boas 46 (43); Henriette Ishimwe 4/23 (4 overs)

Rwanda won by 58 runs
Gahanga B Ground, Kigali
Umpires: Ange Igihozo (Rwa) and Gaston Niyibizi (Rwa)
Player of the match: Henriette Ishimwe (Rwa)

- Rwanda won the toss and elected to bat.

14 June 2026
13:30
Scorecard

Malawi; 48 (15 overs)	v	Nigeria; 49/5 (9 overs)
Sugeni Kananji 26 (26); Lillian Udeh 4/2 (2 overs)		Christabel Chukwuonye 20 (25); Vanessa Phiri 2/22 (3 overs)

Nigeria won by 5 wickets
Gahanga International Cricket Stadium, Kigali
Umpires: Diane Dusabemungu (Rwa) and Forster Mutizwa (Zim)
Player of the match: Favour Eseigbe (Nga)

- Malawi won the toss and elected to bat.

15 June 2026
09:30
Scorecard

Rwanda; 131/6 (20 overs)	v	Zimbabwe XI; 98 (19.4 overs)
Marie Bimenyimana 41* (37); Nyasha Gwanzura 2/10 (3 overs)		Nyasha Gwanzura 33 (26); Henriette Ishimwe 4/26 (4 overs)

Rwanda won by 33 runs
Gahanga International Cricket Stadium, Kigali
Umpires: Diane Dusabemungu (Rwa) and Veronique Iriho (Rwa)
Player of the match: Henriette Ishimwe (Rwa)

- Rwanda won the toss and elected to bat.

15 June 2026
09:30
Scorecard

Nigeria; 117/5 (20 overs)	v	Brazil; 120/3 (18.4 overs)
Salome Sunday 33* (25); Laura Cardoso 1/10 (2 overs)		Monnike Machado 48* (35); Lillian Udeh 1/13 (4 overs)

Brazil won by 7 wickets
Gahanga B Ground, Kigali
Umpires: Peju Adetoro (Nga) and Remy Singizwa (Rwa)
Player of the match: Monnike Machado (Bra)

- Brazil won the toss and elected to field.

15 June 2026
13:30
Scorecard

Rwanda; 155/5 (20 overs)	v	Malawi; 87/7 (20 overs)
Gisele Ishimwe 66 (49); Sugeni Kananji 2/32 (4 overs)		Angela Lumbe 42 (58); Ruth Uwimana 3/6 (4 overs)

Rwanda won by 68 runs
Gahanga International Cricket Stadium, Kigali
Umpires: Ange Igihozo (Rwa) and Forster Mutizwa (Zim)
Player of the match: Ruth Uwimana (Rwa)

- Rwanda won the toss and elected to bat.

17 June 2026
09:30
Scorecard

Zimbabwe XI; 126/7 (20 overs)	v	Nigeria; 89 (15.1 overs)
Nyasha Gwanzura 57 (42); Christabel Chukwuonye 4/21 (4 overs)		Salome Sunday 19 (21); Adel Zimunu 4/26 (4 overs)

Zimbabwe XI won by 37 runs
Gahanga International Cricket Stadium, Kigali
Umpires: Veronique Iriho (Rwa) and Remy Singizwa (Rwa)
Player of the match: Adel Zimunu (Zimbabwe XI)

- Zimbabwe XI won the toss and elected to bat.

17 June 2026
13:30
Scorecard

Brazil; 87/7 (20 overs)	v	Malawi; 76/8 (20 overs)
Roberta Moretti Avery 41* (49); Sugeni Kananji 3/10 (4 overs)		Sugeni Kananji 31 (31); Lara Moisés 3/7 (4 overs)

Brazil won by 11 runs
Gahanga International Cricket Stadium, Kigali
Umpires: Diane Dusabemungu (Rwa) and Gaston Niyibizi (Rwa)
Player of the match: Lara Moisés (Bra)

- Malawi won the toss and elected to field.

18 June 2026
09:30
Scorecard

Rwanda; 128/5 (20 overs)	v	Brazil; 128/8 (20 overs)
Marie Bimenyimana 49* (41); Maria Ribeiro 1/16 (4 overs)		Roberta Moretti Avery 56* (50); Alice Ikuzwe 2/11 (3 overs)

Match tied
(Brazil won the Super Over)
Gahanga B Ground, Kigali
Umpires: Ange Igihozo (Rwa) and Gaston Niyibizi (Rwa)
Player of the match: Roberta Moretti Avery (Bra)

- Brazil won the toss and elected to field.

18 June 2026
13:30
Scorecard

Zimbabwe XI; 173/7 (20 overs)	v	Malawi; 68 (14.2 overs)
Runyararo Pasipanodya 38* (19); Lucy Malino 2/24 (4 overs)		Lidia Dimba 16 (20); Lindokuhle Mabhera 4/13 (4 overs)

Zimbabwe XI won by 105 runs
Gahanga B Ground, Kigali
Umpires: Peju Adetoro (Nga) and Remy Singizwa (Rwa)
Player of the match: Lindokuhle Mabhera (Zim)

- Zimbabwe XI won the toss and elected to bat.

19 June 2026
13:30
Scorecard

Rwanda; 131/8 (20 overs)	v	Nigeria; 120/9 (20 overs)
Clarrisse Uwase 59 (48); Christabel Chukwuonye 4/18 (4 overs)		Esther Sandy 63 (53); Belise Murekatete 3/21 (4 overs)

Rwanda won by 11 runs
Gahanga B Ground, Kigali
Umpires: Diane Dusabemungu (Rwa) and Veronique Iriho (Rwa)
Player of the match: Clarrisse Uwase (Rwa)

- Nigeria won the toss and elected to field.
- Deborah Bassey (Nga) made her T20I debut.

== Third place play-off ==
20 June 2026
09:30
Scorecard

Brazil; 85 (20 overs)	v	Nigeria; 86/8 (19.2 overs)
Roberta Moretti Avery 19 (26); Christabel Chukwuonye 3/13 (4 overs)		Adeshola Adekunle 26 (37); Maria Ribeiro 2/14 (4 overs)

Nigeria won by 2 wickets
Gahanga International Cricket Stadium, Kigali
Umpires: Diane Dusabemungu (Rwa) and Ange Igihozo (Rwa)
Player of the match: Christabel Chukwuonye (Nga)

- Nigeria won the toss and elected to field.

== Final ==
20 June 2026
13:30
Scorecard

Zimbabwe XI; 126/5 (20 overs)	v	Rwanda; 125/8 (20 overs)
Runyararo Pasipanodya 45* (35); Rosine Irera 1/13 (2 overs)		Henriette Ishimwe 60*(38); Lindokuhle Mabhera 2/16 (3 overs)

Zimbabwe XI won by 1 run
Gahanga International Cricket Stadium, Kigali
Umpires: Veronique Iriho (Rwa) and Gaston Niyibizi (Rwa)
Player of the match: Runyararo Pasipanodya (Zim)

- Zimbabwe XI won the toss and elected to bat.
