= Marylebone Cricket Club in East Africa in 1973–74 =

A cricket team representing the Marylebone Cricket Club toured East Africa in the 1973/74 season playing games against Kenya, Tanzania, Uganda and Zambia as well as against other local teams. A match against the full East African team at the end of the tour was given first-class status.

== Tour matches ==
29 December 1973

Zambia	v	Marylebone Cricket Club

Lusaka Club Ground, Lusaka

31 December 1973

Zambia	v	Marylebone Cricket Club

Harrison Oval, Ek Park, Kitwe

4 January 1974

Tanzania	v	Marylebone Cricket Club

Gymkhana Club Ground, Dar-es-Salaam

7 January 1974

Moshi	v	Marylebone Cricket Club

Moshi Club, Moshi

10 January 1974

Coast Cricket Association	v	Marylebone Cricket Club

Mombasa Sports Club Ground, Mombasa

11 January 1974

Kenya	v	Marylebone Cricket Club

Mombasa Sports Club Ground, Mombasa

15 January 1974

Kenya and Uganda	v	Marylebone Cricket Club

Nairobi Club Ground, Nairobi

18-20 January 1974
scorecard

Marylebone Cricket Club	v	East Africa
300 (106.2 overs); Peter Parfitt 83; Pranlal Divecha 4/64 (22 overs)		169 (72.2 overs); Jagoo Shah 53; Tom Cartwright 5/53 (30 overs)
208/7d (51 overs); Roger Knight 51*; Zulfiqar Ali 3/43 (11 overs)		102 (48.4 overs); Narendra Thakker 22; Roger Knight 5/30 (18 overs)

Marylebone Cricket Club won by 237 runs
Gymkhana Club Ground, Nairobi
Umpires: J Morgan and NJ Patel

- Marylebone Cricket Club won the toss and decided to bat
