= Kwibuka T20 Tournament =

International cricket tournament

- Administrator: Rwanda Cricket Association
- Format: 20 over, Twenty20 International
- First edition: 2014
- Latest edition: 2026
- Current champion: Zimbabwe XI (1st title)
- Most successful: Kenya (4 titles)

The Kwibuka T20 Tournament is a women's Twenty20 cricket tournament played annually in Rwanda since 2014. The tournament was originally named the Kwibuka Cricket for Peace tournament, and is played in remembrance of the victims of the 1994 genocide against the Tutsi. In the early editions, the tournament was contested by East African nations, but it has expanded in more recent years to include teams from across Africa and beyond.

== History ==
The inaugural edition was held in June 2014 at the Kicukiro Oval, now known as the Gahanga International Cricket Stadium in Kigali, and was played as a five-match bilateral contest between Rwanda and Uganda, which was won 4–1 by the Ugandans. The 2015 edition was played a double round-robin tri-nation series, which saw Kenya participate in addition to Rwanda and Uganda. The Kenyans won all four of their matches to claim the title, while the hosts failed to register a win. Kenya withdrew from the 2016 tournament, leaving Rwanda and Uganda to play a bilateral series which was won 4–0 by the visitors. Uganda also won a 40-over contest the day after the conclusion of the T20 series.

In 2017, Uganda sent two age groups teams to participate, alongside Rwanda and Kenya. The Uganda Schools Select (under-19s) team won all three of their round-robin matches. Kenya won the tournament for the second time by defeating them in the final by 7 wickets, while Uganda under-23s won the third-place play-off game against Rwanda. The Ugandan School Select side returned for the 2018 edition and were again defeated by Kenya in the final, with Rwanda third; Tanzania and Zambia had originally been announced to participate for the first time.

Starting from the 2019 edition, matches played at the Kwibuka Cup have had official Twenty20 International (T20I) status, following the International Cricket Council's decision to grant full T20I status to women's matches played between all of its members from 1 July 2018. Tanzania and Mali participated for the first time, along with Rwanda and Uganda; The defending champions Kenya had to withdraw due to a lack of funding. Tanzania won all six of their games to claim the title on their first appearance. Uganda finished as runners-up, ahead of Rwanda in third and Mali in fourth. The tournament received global attention due to a number of women's T20I records being set, including the Mali team being bowled out for six runs by the hosts Rwanda, making it the lowest team total in a completed T20I match. The Rwandan side chased down the target of seven runs in just four balls to win the match by ten wickets with 116 balls to spare. Later in the tournament, Uganda scored 314/2 against Mali, which was the highest team total in Women's Twenty20 internationals. It was the first time in a T20 international cricket match, male or female, that a team had scored 300 runs. The Mali team were bowled out for 10 runs in 11.1 overs in the same match and the margin of victory (304 runs) was the biggest ever in a T20I match.

No tournament was held in 2020 due to the COVID-19 pandemic. The schedule for the 2021 tournament featured six sides, including first appearances for Botswana, Namibia and Nigeria. However, Uganda had to withdraw due to cases of COVID-19 in their camp. Kenya won their fourth Kwibuka tournament by defeating Namibia by 7 wickets in the final. Rwanda finished the tournament in third place, after beating Nigeria by eight runs in the play-off match, with Botswana finishing in fifth place. The 2022 tournament was originally expected to involve eleven teams. This was later reduced to eight, including Brazil and Germany who became the first non-African nations to participate in the Kwibuka tournament. Tanzania defeated Kenya in the final to win the 2022 event.

Rwanda beat Uganda in the 2023 final to win their home tournament for the first time. Uganda beat Zimbabwe A by 2 runs in the 2024 final. Tanzania won their third title in 2025.

== Tournaments summary ==
Year	Result				Refs
Year	Winner	Runner-up	Third	Fourth	Refs
2014	Uganda	Rwanda	N/A	N/A	
2015	Kenya	Uganda	Rwanda	N/A	
2016	Uganda	Rwanda	N/A	N/A	
2017	Kenya	Uganda U19	Uganda U23	Rwanda	
2018	Kenya	Uganda U19	Rwanda	N/A	
2019	Tanzania	Uganda	Rwanda	Mali	
2021	Kenya	Namibia	Rwanda	Nigeria	
2022	Tanzania	Kenya	Uganda	Rwanda	
2023	Rwanda	Uganda	Kenya	Nigeria	
2024	Uganda	Zimbabwe A	Rwanda	Nigeria	
2025	Tanzania	Zimbabwe XI	Uganda	Rwanda	
2026	Zimbabwe XI	Rwanda	Nigeria	Brazil	

== Performance by team ==
Legend

- 1st – Champions
- 2nd – Runners-up
- 3rd – Third place
- E – Entered

Teams	2014	2015	2016	2017	2018	2019	2021	2022	2023	2024	2025	2026	Total 12
Botswana	—	—	—	—	—	—	5th	8th	5th	6th	—	—	4
Brazil	—	—	—	—	—	—	—	6th	—	—	6th	4th	3
Cameroon	—	—	—	—	—	—	—	—	—	8th	9th	—	2
Germany	–	—	—	—	—	—	—	7th	—	—	—	—	1
Kenya	—	1st	—	1st	1st	—	1st	2nd	3rd	5th	—	—	7
Malawi	—	—	—	—	—	—	—	—	—	7th	7th	5th	3
Mali	—	—	—	—	—	4th	—	—	—	—	—	—	1
Namibia	—	—	—	—	—	—	2nd	—	—	—	—	—	1
Nigeria	–	—	—	—	—	—	4th	5th	4th	4th	5th	3rd	6
Rwanda	2nd	3rd	2nd	4th	3rd	3rd	3rd	4th	1st	3rd	4th	2nd	12
Sierra Leone	—	—	—	—	—	—	—	—	—	—	8th	—	1
Tanzania	—	—	—	—	—	1st	—	1st	—	—	1st	—	3
Uganda	1st	2nd	1st	2nd (Note: In 2017, Uganda were represented by an under-19 side which finished 2nd, and an under-23 side which finished 3rd)	2nd (Note: Represented by Uganda under-19s)	2nd	—	3rd	2nd	1st	3rd	—	10
Zimbabwe	—	—	—	—	—	—	—	—	—	2nd (Note: Represented by Zimbabwe A)	2nd (Note: Represented by a Zimbabwe High Performance XI)	1st	3

Kwibuka T20 Tournament Champions and Runner-ups
Rank	Country	Champions	Runners-up	Apps.
1	Kenya	4	1	7
2	Uganda (Note: Uganda's statistics include the results of the Uganda under-19 and under-23 teams.)	3	5	10
3	Tanzania	3	0	3
4	Rwanda	1	3	12
5	Zimbabwe (Note: Zimbabwe's statistics include the results of Zimbabwe A and Zimbabwe High Performance XI.)	1	2	3
6	Namibia	0	1	1
Updated as of the end of the 2026 Tournament.
