= Moses Anafie =

Ghanaian cricketer (born 1988)

Personal information
- Born: 23 August 1988 (age 38)

International information
- National side: Ghana
- T20I debut (cap 15): 18 August 2021 v Rwanda
- Last T20I: 21 October 2021 v Uganda
- Source: Cricinfo, 21 October 2021

Moses Anafie (born 23 August 1988) is a Ghanaian cricketer. He was named in Ghana's squad for the 2017 ICC World Cricket League Division Five tournament in South Africa. He played in Ghana's second fixture, against Vanuatu, on 4 September 2017.

In August 2021, he was named in Ghana's squad for their Twenty20 International (T20I) series against Rwanda. He made his T20I debut on 18 August 2021, against Rwanda.
