= Divecha =

Divecha is a toponymic Gujarati-language surname from Diu, India. Notable people with the surname include:

- Ajay Divecha (1940–1987), Indian cricketer
- Buck Divecha (1927–2003), Indian cricketer
- Dwarka Divecha (1918–1978), Indian cinematographer and actor
- Pranlal Divecha, Tanzanian cricketer
- Narayan Hemchandra Divecha (1855–1904), Indian writer, translator and critic
