= List of Rwanda Twenty20 International cricketers =

This is a list of Rwandan Twenty20 International cricketers.

In April 2018, the ICC decided to grant full Twenty20 International (T20I) status to all its members. Therefore, all Twenty20 matches played between Rwanda and other ICC members from 1 January 2019 onwards have the T20I status. Rwanda played their first T20I against Ghana on 18 August 2021 during their tour of Rwanda.

This list comprises all members of the Rwanda cricket team who have played at least one T20I match. It is initially arranged in the order in which each player won his first Twenty20 cap. Where more than one player won their first Twenty20 cap in the same match, those players are listed alphabetically by surname.

== Key ==
General

- ‡ – Captain
- † – Wicket-keeper
- First – Year of debut
- Last – Year of latest game
- Mat – Number of matches played

Batting

- Runs – Runs scored in career
- HS – Highest score
- Avg – Runs scored per dismissal
- * – Batsman remained not out
- 50 – Number of half centuries

Bowling

- Balls – Balls bowled in career
- Wkt – Wickets taken in career
- BBI – Best bowling in an innings
- Ave – Average runs per wicket

Fielding

- Ca – Catches taken
- St – Stumpings affected

== List of players ==
Statistics are correct as of 17 September 2026.

Rwanda T20I cricketers
| General | | | | | Batting | | | | | Bowling | | | | Fielding | | Ref |
| No. | Name | First | Last | Mat | Runs | HS | Avg | 50 | 100 | Balls | Wkt | BBI | Ave | Ca | St | Ref |
|---|---|---|---|---|---|---|---|---|---|---|---|---|---|---|---|---|
| 1 | Martin Akayezu | 2021 | 2026 | 115 | 674 | 51 | 8.79 | 1 | 0 | 1,925 | 117 | 4/9 | 21.41 | 43 | 0 | |
| 2 | Zappy Bimenyimana | 2021 | 2026 | 110 | 343 | 30 | 7.79 | 0 | 0 | 1,977 | 102 | 3/2 | 22.97 | 28 | 0 | |
| 3 | Eric Dusingizimana | 2021 | 2024 | 62 | 1028 | 66* | 18.03 | 4 | 0 | – | – | – | – | 11 | 0 | |
| 4 | Kevin Irakoze‡ | 2021 | 2024 | 75 | 478 | 60 | 10.17 | 1 | 0 | 1,296 | 74 | 4/20 | 19.13 | 8 | 0 | |
| 5 | Yvan Mitari | 2021 | 2022 | 19 | 9 | 3* | 2.25 | 0 | 0 | 271 | 12 | 3/39 | 27.75 | 0 | 0 | |
| 6 | Didier Ndikubwimana‡† | 2021 | 2026 | 119 | 2,076 | 82* | 19.77 | 11 | 0 | – | – | – | – | 87 | 17 | |
| 7 | Wilson Niyitanga | 2021 | 2024 | 61 | 708 | 55* | 12.87 | 2 | 0 | – | – | – | – | 10 | 0 | |
| 8 | Eric Niyomugabo | 2021 | 2023 | 48 | 442 | 61 | 10.52 | 2 | 0 | 182 | 10 | 3/32 | 22.60 | 11 | 0 | |
| 9 | Clinton Rubagumya‡ | 2021 | 2025 | 91 | 834 | 40 | 13.67 | 0 | 0 | 1,099 | 63 | 3/5 | 21.39 | 24 | 0 | |
| 10 | Subhasis Samal | 2021 | 2021 | 8 | 72 | 31 | 14.40 | 0 | 0 | – | – | – | – | 2 | 0 | |
| 11 | Orchide Tuyisenge | 2021 | 2025 | 92 | 1,354 | 100* | 16.71 | 3 | 1 | – | – | – | – | 28 | 0 | |
| 12 | Bosco Tuyizere | 2021 | 2023 | 13 | 119 | 40 | 13.22 | 0 | 0 | – | – | – | – | 1 | 0 | |
| 13 | David Uwimana† | 2021 | 2026 | 25 | 301 | 54* | 25.08 | 1 | 0 | – | – | – | – | 8 | 0 | |
| 14 | Pankaj Vekaria | 2021 | 2021 | 8 | 55 | 20 | 27.50 | 0 | 0 | 126 | 3 | 1/15 | 52.33 | 3 | 0 | |
| 15 | Emmanuel Sebareme | 2021 | 2024 | 65 | 468 | 34 | 11.70 | 0 | 0 | 1,071 | 62 | 4/6 | 17.16 | 19 | 0 | |
| 16 | Jean Hakizimana | 2022 | 2022 | 2 | 8 | 8 | 4.00 | 0 | 0 | – | – | – | – | 1 | 0 | |
| 17 | Eric Kubwimana | 2022 | 2026 | 42 | 66 | 14* | 4.40 | 0 | 0 | 620 | 38 | 4/8 | 23.07 | 11 | 0 | |
| 18 | Oscar Manishimwe† | 2022 | 2026 | 105 | 1,406 | 89* | 17.14 | 6 | 0 | – | – | – | – | 37 | 0 | |
| 19 | Ignace Ntirenganya | 2022 | 2026 | 69 | 108 | 17* | 8.30 | 0 | 0 | 1,332 | 58 | 3/17 | 26.00 | 11 | 0 | |
| 20 | Aime Mucyodusenge | 2022 | 2025 | 4 | 12 | 9 | 3.00 | 0 | 0 | – | – | – | – | 1 | 0 | |
| 21 | Emile Rukiriza | 2023 | 2026 | 90 | 308 | 29* | 7.16 | 0 | 0 | 1,687 | 95 | 5/11 | 18.69 | 39 | 0 | |
| 22 | Israel Mugisha | 2023 | 2026 | 16 | 58 | 16 | 8.28 | 0 | 0 | 234 | 11 | 2/12 | 26.36 | 2 | 0 | |
| 23 | Jean Iradukunda | 2023 | 2026 | 18 | 59 | 25 | 7.37 | 0 | 0 | 355 | 17 | 4/39 | 26.70 | 5 | 0 | |
| 24 | Muhammad Nadir | 2023 | 2026 | 84 | 263 | 19 | 11.43 | 0 | 0 | 1,903 | 96 | 4/10 | 16.16 | 22 | 0 | |
| 25 | Hamza Khan | 2023 | 2026 | 57 | 1,343 | 164* | 28.57 | 8 | 1 | 12 | 0 | – | – | 2 | 0 | |
| 26 | Yves Cyusa | 2024 | 2026 | 42 | 333 | 61 | 13.32 | 1 | 0 | 396 | 30 | 4/13 | 13.26 | 9 | 0 | |
| 27 | Daniel Gumyusenge | 2024 | 2026 | 43 | 544 | 68 | 15.54 | 2 | 0 | – | – | – | – | 22 | 0 | |
| 28 | Isae Niyomugabo | 2024 | 2026 | 46 | 840 | 59* | 22.70 | 3 | 0 | – | – | – | – | 18 | 0 | |
| 29 | Rukundo Pierre | 2024 | 2024 | 8 | 44 | 15* | 7.33 | 0 | 0 | 72 | 2 | 2/12 | 57.00 | 2 | 0 | |
| 30 | Francois Zirahangaje | 2025 | 2025 | 2 | – | – | – | – | – | 36 | 1 | 1/26 | 54.00 | 0 | 0 | |
| 31 | Chancellier Nzabarinda | 2026 | 2026 | 2 | 1 | 1 | 1.00 | 0 | 0 | 36 | 1 | 1/37 | 58.00 | 2 | 0 | |
