= Ghanaian cricket team in Rwanda in 2021 =

International cricket tour

Ghana cricket team in Rwanda in 2021
	Rwanda	Ghana
- Dates: 18 – 21 August 2021
Captains	Clinton Rubagumya	Obed Harvey

Twenty20 International series
- Results: Ghana won the 5-match series 3–2
Most runs	Eric Niyomugabo (98)	Amoluk Singh (219)
Most wickets	Kevin Irakoze (8)	Obed Harvey (7)
- Player of the series: Amoluk Singh (Gha)

The Ghana cricket team toured Rwanda in August 2021 to play a five-match Twenty20 International (T20I) series at the Gahanga International Cricket Stadium in Kigali. The series provided preparation for both teams ahead of the 2021 ICC Men's T20 World Cup Africa Sub-Regional Qualifier, that was also played in Kigali in October 2021.

The two games on the first day of the series were shared, with Rwanda winning the opener by one wicket before Ghana took victory in the second game by two wickets. After another win for each side, Ghana clinched the series 3–2 by winning the final game by 7 wickets, helped by 80 not out from player of the series Amoluk Singh.

There was some confusion regarding the result of the fourth match, which saw Rwanda reach 30/1 from five overs in their run-chase, before rain prevented any further play. Instead of Ghana winning via the DLS method, the Rwandan team conceded the match.

== Squads ==
Rwanda	Ghana
Clinton Rubagumya (c); Martin Akayezu; Zappy Bimenyimana; Eric Dusingizimana; Kevin Irakoze; Yvan Mitari; Didier Ndikubwimana (wk); Wilson Niyitanga; Eric Niyomugabo; Subhasis Samal; Orchide Tuyisenge; Bosco Tuyizere; David Uwimana (wk); Pankaj Vekaria	Obed Harvey (c); Moses Anafie; Daniel Anefie; Samson Awiah; Richmond Baaleri; Francis Bakiweyem; Godfred Bakiweyem; Rexford Bakum; Kofi Bagabena; Theodore Joseph (wk); Amoluk Singh; Devender Singh; Aziz Sualley; James Vifah

Rwanda also named Damascene Abizera and Ignace Ntirenganya as reserves for the series.

== T20I series ==
=== 1st T20I ===
18 August 2021
09:30
Scorecard

Ghana; 164/5 (20 overs)	v	Rwanda; 165/9 (19.4 overs)
Amoluk Singh 58 (40); Zappy Bimenyimana 2/32 (4 overs)		Martin Akayezu 51 (19); Godfred Bakiweyem 3/28 (3.4 overs)

Rwanda won by 1 wicket
Gahanga International Cricket Stadium, Kigali
Umpires: Eric Dusabemungu (Rwa) and Itangishaka Olivier (Rwa)
Player of the match: Martin Akayezu (Rwa)

- Ghana won the toss and elected to bat.
- Martin Akayezu, Zappy Bimenyimana, Eric Dusingizimana, Kevin Irakoze, Yvan Mitari, Didier Ndikubwimana, Wilson Niyitanga, Eric Niyomugabo, Clinton Rubagumya, Subhasis Samal, Orchide Tuyisenge, Bosco Tuyizere (Rwa), Moses Anafie, Samson Awiah, Obed Harvey, Theodore Joseph, Amoluk Singh and Devender Singh (Gha) all made their T20I debuts.
- Rwanda played their first men's T20I match.
- Subhasis Samal (Rwa) was replaced by Wilson Niyitanga during the Ghana innings.

=== 2nd T20I ===
18 August 2021
13:50
Scorecard

Rwanda; 139/8 (20 overs)	v	Ghana; 143/8 (17.1 overs)
Martin Akayezu 29 (24); Obed Harvey 2/18 (4 overs)		Amoluk Singh 45 (19); Kevin Irakoze 4/21 (4 overs)

Ghana won by 2 wickets
Gahanga International Cricket Stadium, Kigali
Umpires: Gasana Christian (Rwa) and Vicky Prajapati (Rwa)
Player of the match: Amoluk Singh (Gha)

- Rwanda won the toss and elected to bat.

=== 3rd T20I ===
20 August 2021
09:30
Scorecard

Rwanda; 136/8 (20 overs)	v	Ghana; 79 (15.1 overs)
Bosco Tuyizere 40 (45); Obed Harvey 2/8 (4 overs)		Moses Anafie 21 (22); Zappy Bimenyimana 3/16 (3.1 overs)

Rwanda won by 57 runs
Gahanga International Cricket Stadium, Kigali
Umpires: Gasana Christian (Rwa) and Itangishaka Olivier (Rwa)
Player of the match: Zappy Bimenyimana (Rwa)

- Ghana won the toss and elected to field.
- David Uwimana, Pankaj Vekaria (Rwa) and Francis Bakiweyem (Gha) all made their T20I debuts.

=== 4th T20I ===
20 August 2021
13:50
Scorecard

Ghana; 166/6 (20 overs)	v	Rwanda; 30/1 (5 overs)
Rexford Bakum 63 (41); Kevin Irakoze 3/37 (4 overs)		Eric Niyomugabo 13* (9); Obed Harvey 1/2 (1 over)

Ghana won (Rwanda conceded)
Gahanga International Cricket Stadium, Kigali
Umpires: Eric Dusabemungu (Rwa) and Vicky Prajapati (Rwa)
Player of the match: Rexford Bakum (Gha)

- Ghana won the toss and elected to bat.
- Play was stopped due to rain and Rwanda conceded.

=== 5th T20I ===
21 August 2021
13:30
Scorecard

Rwanda; 147/8 (20 overs)	v	Ghana; 148/3 (18.1 overs)
Eric Niyomugabo 51 (42); Kofi Bagabena 3/27 (4 overs)		Amoluk Singh 80* (57); Clinton Rubagumya 2/9 (3.1 overs)

Ghana won by 7 wickets
Gahanga International Cricket Stadium, Kigali
Umpires: Itangishaka Olivier (Rwa) and Vicky Prajapati (Rwa)
Player of the match: Amoluk Singh (Gha)

- Rwanda won the toss and elected to bat.
