= John Solanky =

Tanzanian cricketer (1942–2003)

Personal information
- Full name: John William Solanky
- Born: 30 June 1942; Dar es Salaam, Tanganyika
- Died: 7 October 2003 (aged 61); Carrickfergus, County Antrim, Northern Ireland
- Batting: Right-handed
- Bowling: Right-arm off spin/medium pace
- Role: Bowler

Domestic team information
- Years: Team
- 1963: East African Invitation XI
- 1964: Coast Cricket Association XI
- 1969: Devon
- 1972–1976: Glamorgan
- FC debut: 2 November 1963 East African Invitation XI v MCC
- Last FC: 11 August 1976 Glamorgan v Somerset
- LA debut: 10 May 1969 Devon v Hertfordshire
- Last LA: 8 August 1976 Glamorgan v West Indies

Career statistics
Competition	First-class	List A
Matches	84	91
Runs scored	2,374	1,134
Batting average	20.46	18.29
100s/50s	0/9	0/2
Top score	73	60
Balls bowled	9917	3626
Wickets	183	92
Bowling average	25.34	27.46
5 wickets in innings	8	0
10 wickets in match	0	0
Best bowling	6/63	4/23
Catches/stumpings	17/–	21/–
- Source: CricketArchive, 16 August 2008

John William Solanky (30 June 1942 – 7 October 2003) was a Tanzanian cricketer. A right-handed batsman and right-arm off spin/medium pace bowler, he played for Glamorgan County Cricket Club between 1972 and 1976.

== Biography ==
=== Early life and career ===
Born in Dar es Salaam in 1942, John Solanky played twice for Tanganyika – against Uganda in 1959 and 1960. He made his first-class cricket debut in November 1963, playing for an East African Invitation XI against the MCC in Kampala.

He played a second first-class match in 1964, for a Coast Cricket Association XI against Pakistan International Airlines in Mombasa, but soon emigrated to England due to political changes in Tanzania. Here he began to play league cricket in Plymouth Devon for Plymouth Cricket Club in 1966 (scoring a century in his first match for the 2nd XI) while an Engineering student at the Technical College and represented Devon County Cricket Club in the Minor Counties Championship from 1967 to 1969, also making his List A debut when he played for Devon against Hertfordshire in the first round of the 1969 Gillette Cup.

=== Glamorgan career ===
His bowling and batting at minor counties level attracted the attention of first-class county scouts, and he was signed by Glamorgan, making his debut for the county in a friendly match against Worcestershire in April 1972. He made his competitive debut for them four days later, playing a Benson & Hedges Cup match against Gloucestershire, and his County Championship debut the following month in a match against Hampshire. After the season, Solanky returned to Africa with his county side, playing a three match series against the Zambia national cricket team.

His 1973 season started with various John Player League and Benson & Hedges Cup matches in addition to first-class matches against Cambridge University and New Zealand, and by this time he had become a regular in the Glamorgan side.

Solanky played in several matches for Glamorgan over the following few years, and also played against his old East African team as they warmed up for the 1975 World Cup. He was notably omitted from the East African world cup team. Despite having played previously for them and his experience in first-class cricket he was overlooked likely as selectors supposedly made a point of picking players that were currently living and playing in East Africa. His Glamorgan career eventually came to an end in 1976 when the county signed West Indian all-rounder Collis King. He was still on the books at the county in 1977, and played for the Under-25s (though he was 34 at the time) and Second XI that year.

=== Later life and career ===
After leaving Glamorgan, Solanky spent a year as a cricket coach and squash professional in South Wales before moving to Northern Ireland in 1980. He played for and coached Lisburn Cricket Club and Cliftonville Cricket Club, coaching future Ireland internationals such as Kyle McCallan, Andrew Patterson and Mark Patterson.

In the late 1980s he began teaching technology at Hopefield High School in Newtownabbey, continuing to play as an amateur with Cliftonville CC until 1993. He remained in the teaching profession until he died suddenly from a heart attack in 2003.

== Cricket statistics ==
In 84 first-class matches, Solanky scored 2374 runs at an average of 20.46 with a top score of 73 for Glamorgan against Cambridge University in 1975. Solanky took his 100th first-class wicket in the same match. He took 183 wickets at an average of 25.34, with best innings bowling figures of 6/63 against Derbyshire in 1975. In 91 List A matches, he scored 1134 runs at an average of 18.29, with a top score of 60 against Derbyshire in 1975. He took 92 wickets at an average of 27.46, with best innings bowling figures of 4/23 for Glamorgan against Nottinghamshire in 1973.
