= Eric Dusingizimana =

Rwandan engineer and cricketer

Personal information
- Born: 21 March 1987 (age 39)
- Batting: Right-handed
- Role: Batter

International information
- National side: Rwanda
- T20I debut (cap 3): 18 August 2021 v Ghana
- Last T20I: 12 December 2024 v Uganda

Career statistics
Competition	T20I
Matches	62
Runs scored	1028
Batting average	18.03
100s/50s	0/4
Top score	66*
Catches/stumpings	11/0
- Source: Cricinfo, 26 September 2025

Eric Dusingizimana (born 21 March 1987) is a Rwandan cricketer and civil engineer who also captained the Rwanda national cricket team. He is also a Guinness World Record holder for his marathon effort in 2016 when he batted for 51 hours non-stop in order to raise funds for the construction of Gahanga International Cricket Stadium.

== Early life ==
He was born in a family of six siblings. He witnessed the 1994 Rwandan genocide as a six-year-old boy. He along with his family members managed to survive the genocide, which killed more than 600,000 people in Rwanda. He began playing cricket at the age of 18 in 2006 when he was studying in the high school. He idolised AB de Villiers and MS Dhoni when he started playing cricket. He pursued interest in cricket due to cricket being in tune with the subject combination which he selected for his studies.

== Domestic career ==
Dusingizimana started playing cricket for Right Guards team in 2006. He won the fifty-overs Premier League while playing for Right Guards. He later played for Young Tigers, Impala Titans and Dugout CC. He won the Player of the Tournament Award in the one-day format while playing for Impala Titans in 2010. He also guided the team to the 20-overs title in the same year. He rejoined Right Guards in 2014 and also captained the team.

In 2015, he scored a 60-ball hundred for Right Guards against Indorwa at Computer Point 20-over tournament.

== International career ==
He pursued his higher studies at his university in the field of civil engineering. He also graduated in architecture technology. He was selected to the national team in 2008 for the 2008 ICC World Cricket League Africa Region Division Three tournament. He represented Rwanda Under-19s in the 2010 Africa Under-19 Championship Division Two. He was appointed captain of the national cricket team in 2011.

In May 2016, he embarked on a unique mission to support the Rwanda Cricket Association in order to build the first cricket stadium in Rwanda. Eric took it as his dream project with a vision of establishing Rwanda's first ever cricket ground. He batted for about 51 hours continuously at Amaharo Stadium in Remera for more than two days indoors which also attracted a huge crowd and national attention. His attempt was later recognised by the Guinness World Record officials as the world record for the longest individual net session. He began his attempt on 11 May 2016 and was allowed a five-minute break for every hour of his batting session and completed the task on 13 May 2016 at the Amahoro Stadium in Kigali. He also faced throwdowns from the former British Prime Minister Tony Blair who was on an official visit to Rwanda in order to attend the World Economic Forum on Africa. He also faced deliveries from Julienne Uwacu, Mutesi Jolly, Jimmy Mulis, Andrew Mitchell and William Gelling. His wife bowled the last delivery of his session. He broke the world record of India's Virag Mare who batted 50 hours during his marathon efforts at Mahahalaxmi Lawns at Karve Nagar in Pune. Prior to this effort, the record was held by English players Dave Newman and Richard Wells who batted for 48 hours at a stretch. Following his marathon effort, he was hailed as a national hero in Rwanda. Rwanda Stadium Cricket Foundation, a charity organisation was set up to raise funds to construct the Gahanga International Cricket Stadium. In June 2016, he travelled to England, spent a week in London and managed to raise £120,000. He was accompanied by English cricketer Joe Root who joined his fundraising trip across England.

He also approached the United Nation High Commissioner for Refugees in order to discuss his interest to launch cricket training programs for refugees in Rwanda.

In August 2021, he was named in the Rwandan squad for the home T20I series against Ghana. He made his T20I debut for Rwanda on 18 August 2021, against Ghana, in what was Rwanda's first official T20I. He was the highest run-scorer for Rwanda at the 2023 East Africa T20 Cup, which was won by Uganda.

On 13 December 2024, he announced his retirement from cricket.

== See also ==
- List of Rwanda Twenty20 International cricketers
- Cathia Uwamahoro
