= Tanzania national cricket team =

Tanzania
- Nickname: The Cows
- Association: Tanzania Cricket Association

Personnel
- Captain: Kassim Nassoro
- Coach: Salieg Nackerdien, Imran Nackerdien
- Chairman: Dr. B.S. Sreekumar

International Cricket Council
- ICC status: Associate member (2001)
- ICC region: Africa
ICC Rankings	Current	Best-ever
T20I	34th	30th (17 Nov 2021)

International cricket
- First international: (Tanganyika Territory) Tanganyika v. Kenya (Nairobi; 1 December 1951)

T20 Internationals
- First T20I: v Mozambique at Gahanga International Cricket Stadium, Kigali; 2 November 2021
- Last T20I: v Saint Helena at Achimota Oval B, Accra; 28 March 2026
T20Is	Played	Won/Lost
Total	83	51/29 (0 ties, 3 no results)
This year	4	4/0 (0 ties, 0 no results)
- T20 World Cup Qualifier appearances: 2 (Note: For the 2024 and 2026 Men's T20 World Cups, the final round of qualification in Africa was the ICC Africa Regional Final.) (first in 2023)
- Best result: 4th (2025)
List A & T20I kit
- As of 28 March 2026

The Tanzania national cricket team is the men's team that represents Tanzania in international cricket. Cricket has been played in what is now Tanzania since 1890, and the national side first played in 1951. The Tanzania Cricket Association became an associate member of the International Cricket Council (ICC) in 2001, having previously been part of the East and Central Africa Cricket Conference, which was a member of the ICC in its own right.

In April 2018, the ICC decided to grant full Twenty20 International (T20I) status to all its members. Therefore, all Twenty20 matches played between Tanzania and other ICC members since 1 January 2019 have had the T20I status.

== History ==
=== Beginnings of cricket in Tanzania ===
Cricket was first played in what is now Tanzania on the island of Zanzibar by the British Navy as recreation for the officers and crew. Cricket spread to Tanganyika after the British took over the League of Nations mandate in 1919.

Cricket began to be concentrated mostly on the coast and on Zanzibar, with particular development in Dar-es-Salaam. Population from the Indian subcontinent quickly took up the game and by the 1930s formed the majority of the players, with a significant European minority.

=== National side ===
==== Early matches ====
Distance between Tanganyika and other countries in the African Great Lakes meant that the first international was not played until 1951, when Tanganyika lost by an innings to Kenya. Occasional matches against Kenya and Uganda continued throughout the 1950s and Zanzibar also played matches against Uganda, beginning in 1956.

Other opponents from further afield also toured, with Tanganyika playing the MCC in 1957 and 1963, a South African non-Europeans side in 1958 (who also played Zanzibar) and Pakistan International Airlines in 1964. The occasional matches against Kenya and Uganda eventually led to a formal triangular tournament being introduced in 1967, later to become a quadrangular tournament with the addition of Zambia.

==== Decline ====
As many businesses were nationalised in the early 1970s, much of the Indian and British population began to leave the country. Cricketers, including John Solanky, who went on to play for Glamorgan, were amongst those who left the country, and cricketing standards declined.

Since the 1970s, the Tanzania Cricket Association has concentrated on developing the game amongst the African communities, and the national side now contains between 20 and 25% African players. The national side returned to form in the mid-1990s, when they were runners-up in two Africa-wide tournaments in 1994 and 1995, though there was again a slight decline in the late 1990s.

==== ICC membership ====
The Tanzania Cricket Association became an associate member of the ICC in 2001 (Tanzania had previously played international cricket as part of the combined East Africa and East and Central Africa teams) opening up new opportunities for Tanzanian cricket. The first matches for the national side as an ICC member were in the 2002 Africa Cup where they lost all four of their matches.

They showed improvement by the Africa Cricket Association Championship in 2004, where they still finished last, but did beat Zambia in the final match of the tournament, which was a qualifying event for the 2005 ICC Trophy. Even more improvement was shown in the equivalent tournament two years later, when they won Division Two of the World Cricket League Africa Region. This result qualified Tanzania for Division Three of the World Cricket League in Darwin in 2007. Tanzania finished sixth in that tournament after losing to Hong Kong in a play-off, which relegated them to Division Four.

In 2008, Tanzania hosted Division Four of the World Cricket League. In this tournament they finished fourth, which meant that they remained in Division Four for the next tournament in 2010, played in Italy, where they came 4th again, thus remaining for 2012 ICC World Cricket League Division Four.

== Tournament history ==
Legend

- Champions
- Runners-up
- Third place/Semi-finals
- Hosts
- Q Qualified
- DNQ Did not qualify
- ▲ Promoted
- Remained in the same division
- ▼ Relegated

=== Cricket World Cup ===
Cricket World Cup record								Qualification record				
Year	Round	Position	Pld	W	L	T	NR	Pld	W	L	T	NR
(England) 1975	Part of East Africa							Part of East Africa				
(England) 1979	Part of East Africa							Part of East Africa				
(England) (Wales) 1983	Part of East Africa							Part of East Africa				
(India) (Pakistan) 1987	Part of East Africa							Part of East Africa				
(Australia) (New Zealand) 1992	Part of East and Central Africa							Part of East and Central Africa				
(India) (Pakistan) (Sri Lanka) 1996	Part of East and Central Africa							Part of East and Central Africa				
(England) (Wales) (Scotland) (Republic of Ireland) (Netherlands) 1999	Part of East and Central Africa							Part of East and Central Africa				
(South Africa) (Zimbabwe) (Kenya) 2003	Did not enter							Did not enter				
(Cricket West Indies) 2007	Did not qualify							5	1	4	0	0
(India) (Sri Lanka) (Bangladesh) 2011	Did not qualify							11	3	8	0	0
(Australia) (New Zealand) 2015	Did not qualify							12	3	9	0	0
(England) (Wales) 2019	Did not qualify							12	6	6	0	0
(India) 2023	Did not qualify							Did not qualify				
(South Africa) (Namibia) (Zimbabwe) 2027	Did not qualify							15	3	10	0	2
Total	—N/a	0/14	–	–	–	–	–	55	16	37	0	2

=== CWC Challenge League ===
Cricket World Cup Challenge League record
Year	League	Position	Pld	W	L	T	NR	P/R
2019–2022	Did not qualify							
2024–2026	B	5/6	15	3	10	0	2	▼
Total	0 Titles	1/2	15	3	10	0	2	—N/a

=== Men's T20 World Cup ===
Men's T20 World Cup record								Qualification record				
Year	Round	Position	Pld	W	L	T	NR	Pld	W	L	T	NR
(South Africa) 2007	Not eligible							Not eligible				
(England) 2009	Not eligible							Not eligible				
(Cricket West Indies) 2010	Not eligible							Not eligible				
(Sri Lanka) 2012	Did not qualify							8	5	3	0	0
(Bangladesh) 2014	Did not qualify							15	9	6	0	0
(India) 2016	Did not qualify							5	0	5	0	0
(United Arab Emirates) (Oman) 2021	Did not qualify							6	3	3	0	0
(Australia) 2022	Did not qualify							10	7	3	0	0
(United States) (Cricket West Indies) 2024	Did not qualify							13	7	5	0	1
(India) (Sri Lanka) 2026	Did not qualify							10	7	3	0	0
(Australia) (New Zealand) 2028	To be determined							5*	4	0	0	1
Total	—N/a	0/10	–	–	–	–	–	72	42	28	0	2

=== T20 World Cup Africa Regional Final ===
T20WC Africa Regional Final record
Year	Round	Position	Pld	W	L	T	NR	Qual.
(Uganda) 2019	Did not qualify							
(Rwanda) 2023	Round-robin	3/4	6	3	3	0	0	DNQ
(Namibia) 2023	Round-robin	6/7	6	1	5	0	0	DNQ
(Zimbabwe) 2025	Semi-finals	3/8	5	2	3	0	0	DNQ
(To be determined) 2027	Qualified							
Total	0 Titles	4/5	17	6	11	0	0	—N/a

=== African Games ===
African Games record
Year	Round	Position	GP	W	L	T	NR
(Ghana) 2023	Group stage	6/8	3	1	2	0	0
Total	0 titles	1/1	3	1	2	0	0

=== Other global tournaments ===
CWC Challenge League Play-off (List A)	World Cricket League (LA/ODI/50 overs)
2024: 4th place (Q)	2007 (Division Three) : 6th place (▼); 2008 (Division Four) : 4th place; 2010 (Division Four) : 4th place; 2012 (Division Four) : 6th place (▼); 2014 (Division Five) : 3rd place; 2016 (Division Five) : 5th place

=== Other regional tournaments ===
T20WC Africa Sub-regional Qualifiers (T20I)	ICC Africa T20 C'ship (T20)	ACA Africa T20 Cup (T20I)	East Africa T20 Series (T20I)
2018: 3rd place; 2021: Winners (Q); 2022: Winners (Q); 2024: Winners (Q); 2026: Winners (Q); 2026: Winners (Q)	2011 (Division Two): 4th place; 2012 (Division Two): Runners-up; 2013 (Division One): 3rd place; 2015 (Division One): 6th place	2022: Runners-up	2022: Runners-up; 2023: Runners-up

== Records and statistics ==
International Match Summary — Tanzania

Last updated 28 March 2026

Playing Record
Format	M	W	L	T	NR	Inaugural Match
Twenty20 Internationals	83	51	29	0	3	2 November 2021

=== Twenty20 International ===
- Highest team total: 242/6 v. Mozambique on 2 November 2021 at Gahanga International Cricket Stadium, Kigali.
- Highest individual score: 110, Ivan Selemani v. Seychelles on 27 March 2026 at Achimota Oval B, Accra.
- Best individual bowling figures: 5/2, Yalinde Nkanya v. Cameroon on 9 December 2022 at IPRC Cricket Ground, Kigali.

Most T20I runs for Tanzania

Player	Runs	Average	Career span
Ivan Selemani	1,640	26.03	2021–2026
Abhik Patwa	1,387	26.67	2021–2025
Amal Rajeevan	1,063	26.57	2021–2025
Kassim Nassoro	913	18.26	2021–2026
Omary Kitunda	559	13.30	2021–2026

Most T20I wickets for Tanzania

Player	Wickets	Average	Career span
Ally Kimote	90	16.04	2021–2026
Yalinde Nkanya	71	12.73	2022–2026
SanjayKumar Thakor	65	15.07	2021–2024
Salum Jumbe	65	20.98	2021–2025
Kassim Nassoro	51	21.27	2021–2026

T20I record versus other nations

Records complete to T20I #3790. Last updated 28 March 2026.

Opponent	M	W	L	T	NR	First match	First win
vs Full Members
Zimbabwe	2	0	2	0	0	23 November 2023	
vs Associate Members
Bahrain	4	2	2	0	0	9 March 2024	8 July 2025
Botswana	3	3	0	0	0	7 November 2021	7 November 2021
Cameroon	4	4	0	0	0	6 November 2021	6 November 2021
Eswatini	2	2	0	0	0	6 December 2022	6 December 2022
Gambia	1	1	0	0	0	6 December 2022	6 December 2022
Germany	2	0	2	0	0	7 July 2025	
Ghana	2	2	0	0	0	4 December 2022	4 December 2022
Kenya	5	2	3	0	0	17 November 2021	17 November 2021
Kuwait	1	0	1	0	0	6 March 2024	
Lesotho	1	1	0	0	0	22 September 2024	22 September 2024
Malawi	4	4	0	0	0	20 September 2022	20 September 2022
Malaysia	1	0	1	0	0	10 March 2024	
Mali	1	1	0	0	0	21 September 2024	21 September 2024
Mozambique	2	2	0	0	0	2 November 2021	2 November 2021
Namibia	3	0	3	0	0	28 November 2023	
Nigeria	5	3	1	0	1	17 November 2021	17 November 2021
Rwanda	18	16	2	0	0	31 October 2022	31 October 2022
Saint Helena	1	1	0	0	0	28 March 2026	28 March 2026
Seychelles	1	1	0	0	0	27 March 2026	27 March 2026
Sierra Leone	2	2	0	0	0	3 November 2021	3 November 2021
Uganda	17	3	12	0	2	18 November 2021	19 December 2022
Vanuatu	1	0	1	0	0	5 March 2024	

== Players ==
=== Current squad ===
This lists all the players who have played for Tanzania in the past 12 months or has been part of the latest T20I squad. Updated as of 31 August 2023

Name	Age	Batting style	Bowling style	Notes
Batters
Ivan Selemani	26	Right-handed	Right-arm off break	
Omary Kitunda	27	Right-handed	Right-arm medium	
Abhik Patwa	39	Right-handed	Right-arm off break	Captain
Jitin Singh	42	Right-handed	Right-arm medium	
Dhrumit Mehta	23	Right-handed	Right-arm off break	
All-rounders
Kassim Nassoro	38	Right-handed	Right-arm off break	Vice-captain
Md. Yunusu Issa	25	Right-handed	Right-arm medium	
Shaik Basha	20	Left-handed	Slow left-arm unorthodox	
Wicket-keepers
Amal Rajeevan	29	Right-handed	Slow left-arm orthodox	
Spin Bowlers
Yalinde Nkanya	23	Right-handed	Slow left-arm orthodox	
Sanjay Thakor	36	Right-handed	Right-arm leg break	
Akhil Anil	28	Left-handed	Right-arm off break	
Pace Bowlers
Ally Kimote	34	Right-handed	Right-arm medium	
Salum Jumbe	29	Left-handed	Right-arm medium-fast	
Johnson Nyambo	21	Right-handed	Right-arm medium-fast	

=== Other notable players ===
The following players played for Tanzania or Tanganyika and also played first-class or List A cricket:

- Pranlal Divecha – played one first-class match for East Africa.
- Praful Mehta – played a One-Day International for East Africa in 1975.
- CD Patel – played for East Africa in 1967.
- RD Patel – played three first-class matches in the 1960s.
- Malcolm Ronaldson – Played for Eastern Province in 1937/38.
- John Solanky – Played for Glamorgan between 1972 and 1976.
- Shiraz Sumar – Played an ODI for East Africa in 1975.
- Vasant Tapu – Played two first-class matches for East Africa.
- Paras Keshav – Played for Tanzania U19, Tanzania 1997-2000, played minor counties cricket in England.
- Suresh Raval – played for East Africa
- Vishal amratlal bhadra valambhia... Played minor counties cricket in England and played for Buckingham town cricket club for home counties

== International grounds ==
Locations of all stadiums which have hosted international cricket matches within Tanzania

== See also ==
- East Africa cricket team
- East and Central Africa cricket team
- List of Tanzania Twenty20 International cricketers
- Tanzania national women's cricket team
- Tanzania national under-19 cricket team
