= Pranlal Divecha =

Tanzanian cricketer

Personal information
- Born: Tanzania

Domestic team information
- Years: Team
- 1974: East Africa
- Only FC: 18 January 1974 East Africa v MCC
- Source: CricketArchive, 18 August 2008

Pranlal Divecha (dates unknown) played cricket for Tanzania between 1967 and 1972 and also played first-class cricket for East Africa.

== Career ==
Pranlal Divecha made his debut for Tanzania in a match against India in 1967. He took three wickets in the Indian first innings including those of captain Nawab of Pataudi and Bishan Bedi. The following year he played in an East African Quadrangular tournament in Nairobi, taking 5/113 in the first innings of the match against Zambia.

In 1970 he again played in the East African Quadrangular tournament, this time in Kampala. The tournament was a triangular in 1971 and 1972 when he also played. He played his only first-class match in 1974 when he played for East Africa in a 237 run defeat by the MCC.
