= Salum Jumbe =

Tanzanian cricketer (born 1997)

Personal information
- Born: 4 June 1997 (age 29)
- Batting: Left-handed
- Bowling: Right-arm medium-fast

International information
- National side: Tanzania
- T20I debut (cap 4): 2 November 2021 v Mozambique
- Last T20I: 20 March 2024 v Namibia

Career statistics
| Competition | T20I | LA |
|---|---|---|
| Matches | 56 | 6 |
| Runs scored | 444 | 115 |
| Batting average | 14.32 | 19.16 |
| 100s/50s | 0/1 | 0/1 |
| Top score | 76* | 51 |
| Balls bowled | 935 | 222 |
| Wickets | 59 | 6 |
| Bowling average | 19.61 | 34.66 |
| 5 wickets in innings | 1 | 0 |
| 10 wickets in match | 0 | 0 |
| Best bowling | 5/10 | 3/66 |
| Catches/stumpings | 11/– | 0/– |
- Source: Cricinfo, 25 December 2024

Salum Jumbe (born 4 June 1997) is a Tanzanian cricketer. He played in the 2014 ICC World Cricket League Division Five tournament. In October 2021, he was named in Tanzania's Twenty20 International (T20I) squad for their matches in Group B of the 2021 ICC Men's T20 World Cup Africa Qualifier tournament in Rwanda. He made his T20I debut on 2 November 2021 against Mozambique. Later the same month, he was named in Tanzania's squad for the Regional Final of the 2021 ICC Men's T20 World Cup Africa Qualifier tournament, also in Rwanda.

Among bowlers worldwide who have taken the most T20I wickets on a single ground, Jumbe is in the fourth place. He has taken 38 of his T20I wickets at the Gahanga International Cricket Stadium in Rwanda.
