= Emmanuel Sebareme =

Rwandan cricketer (born 1995)

Personal information
- Full name: Emmanuel King Sebareme
- Born: 19 December 1995 (age 30); Zaire, Democratic Republic of the Congo
- Batting: Right-handed
- Bowling: Right-arm off spin
- Role: Bowler

International information
- National side: Rwanda
- T20I debut (cap 15): 16 October 2021 v Ghana
- Last T20I: 6 July 2024 v Malawi

Domestic team information
- Years: Team
- 2015-2017: Western Province
- Source: ESPNcricinfo, 26 September 2025

Emmanuel King Sebareme (born 19 December 1995) is a Rwandan cricketer who has played professional cricket in South Africa, making his senior debut for Western Province during the 2014–15 season. He made his international debut for the Rwanda cricket team in October 2021.

== Personal life ==
Sebareme was born in Zaire to Rwandan refugee parents, who had fled the conflict of the mid-1990s. Largely traveling on foot, he and his family had arrived in South Africa when he was five years old, settling in Cape Town.

== Career ==
Sebareme began cricket as a medium-fast bowler but later switched to bowling off spin. He also bats right-handed but is known mainly for his bowling. In December 2014, he was selected for Western Province's under-19 team at Khaya Majola Week (the national under-19 tournament). There, he took 12 wickets at an average of 14.33, equal with Namibia's JJ Smit and behind only Northerns' Stefan Klopper (14 wickets) and Border's Sithembele Langa (13 wickets).

In January 2015, Sebareme was selected for the Cape Cobras team at the CSA Cubs Week, an equivalent underage tournament for the South African franchise teams. Later in the month, he made his first-class debut for Western Province in the CSA 3-Day Cup, taking 1/34 and 0/2 from a total of ten overs in the match against North West. He had more success in his next three-day match, taking 2/21 and 0/19 against Griqualand West, as well as in his sole limited-overs match by then, taking 1/18 against North West. Sebareme was named in Western Province's squad for the Africa T20 Cup in September 2015 and went on to make his Twenty20 debut in his team's last match of the tournament. Outside of playing cricket, he studies economics at the University of the Western Cape, on a full bursary.

In 2021, Sebareme expressed interest in representing Rwanda in international cricket, for which he is eligible through his parents. Head coach Martin Suji invited him to Rwanda to try out for the team. In October 2021, he was named in Rwanda's Twenty20 International (T20I) squad for the Group A matches in the 2021 ICC Men's T20 World Cup Africa Qualifier tournament. His T20I debut, against Ghana, was on 16 October 2021.
