= Rwanda Cricket Stadium =

Cricket ground in Kigali, Rwanda

Gahanga International Cricket Stadium
- "Kicukiro Oval" "Rwanda Cricket Stadium"
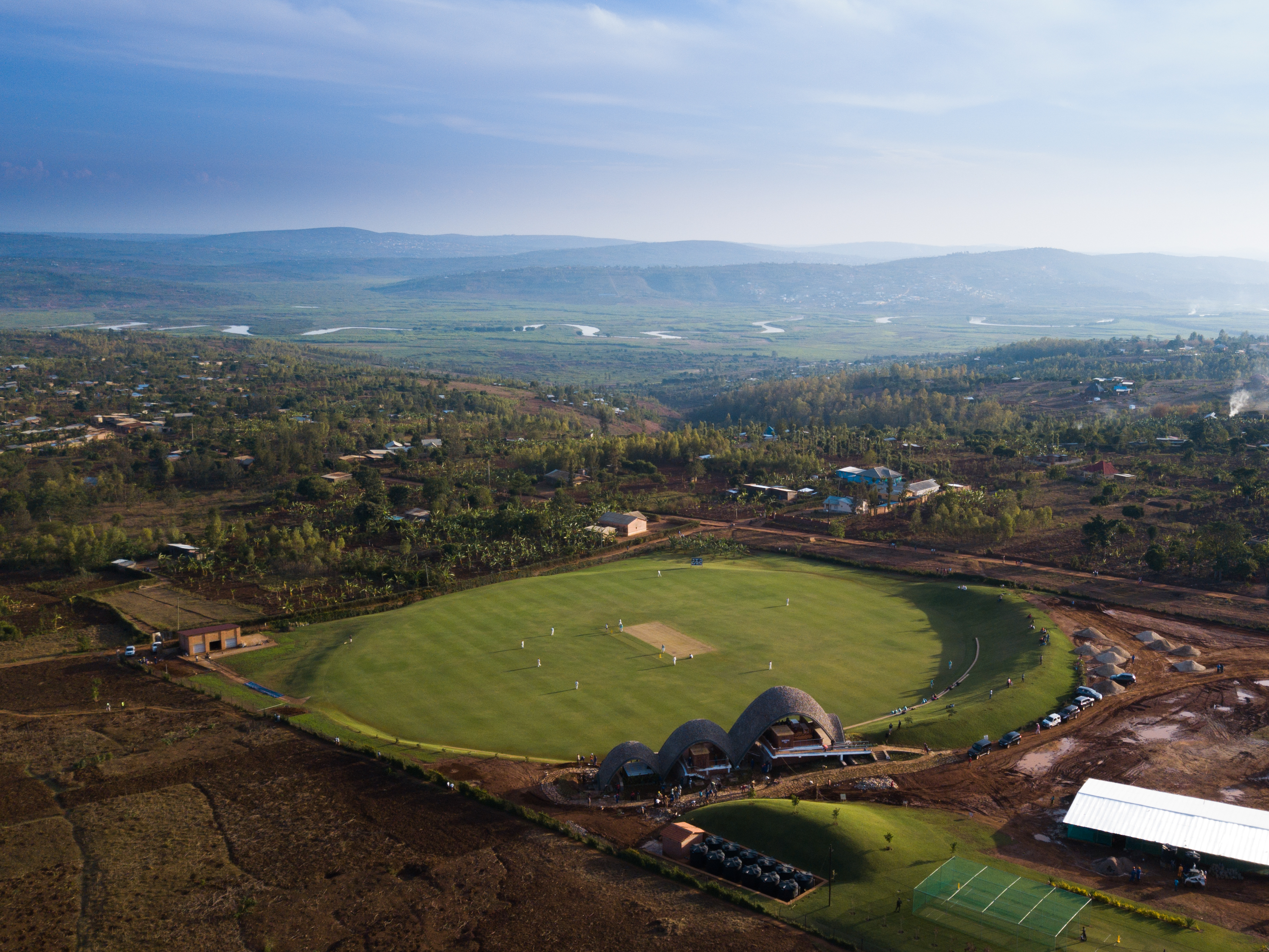
- An aerial photo of the Gahanga Cricket Stadium
- Interactive map of Gahanga International Cricket Stadium

Ground information
- Location: Kigali City, Rwanda
- Coordinates: 2°01′46″S 30°06′26″E
- Capacity: 5,000-10,000
- Owner: Rwanda Cricket Association
- Operator: Rwanda Cricket Stadium Foundation
- Tenants: Rwanda national cricket team
- End names
- Pavilion End Plantation End

International information
- First men's T20I: 18 August 2021: Rwanda v Ghana
- Last men's T20I: 14 December 2024: Nigeria v Uganda
- First women's T20I: 18 June 2019: Tanzania v Uganda
- Last women's T20I: 24 April 2026: Italy v United States
- As of 24 April 2026; Source: ESPNcricinfo

Gahanga B Ground
- Interactive map of Gahanga B Ground

Ground information
- Location: Kigali City, Rwanda
- Tenants: Rwanda national cricket team

International information
- First women's T20I: 31 May 2024: Nigeria v Uganda
- Last women's T20I: 24 April 2026: United States v Vanuatu
- As of 24 April 2026; Source: ESPNcricinfo

Rwanda Cricket Stadium, also known as Kicukiro Oval, is a cricket ground in Kigali, Rwanda. The stadium is officially titled the Gahanga International Cricket Stadium. The ground is Rwanda's first dedicated international cricket ground and has quickly become a prominent ground in African cricket.

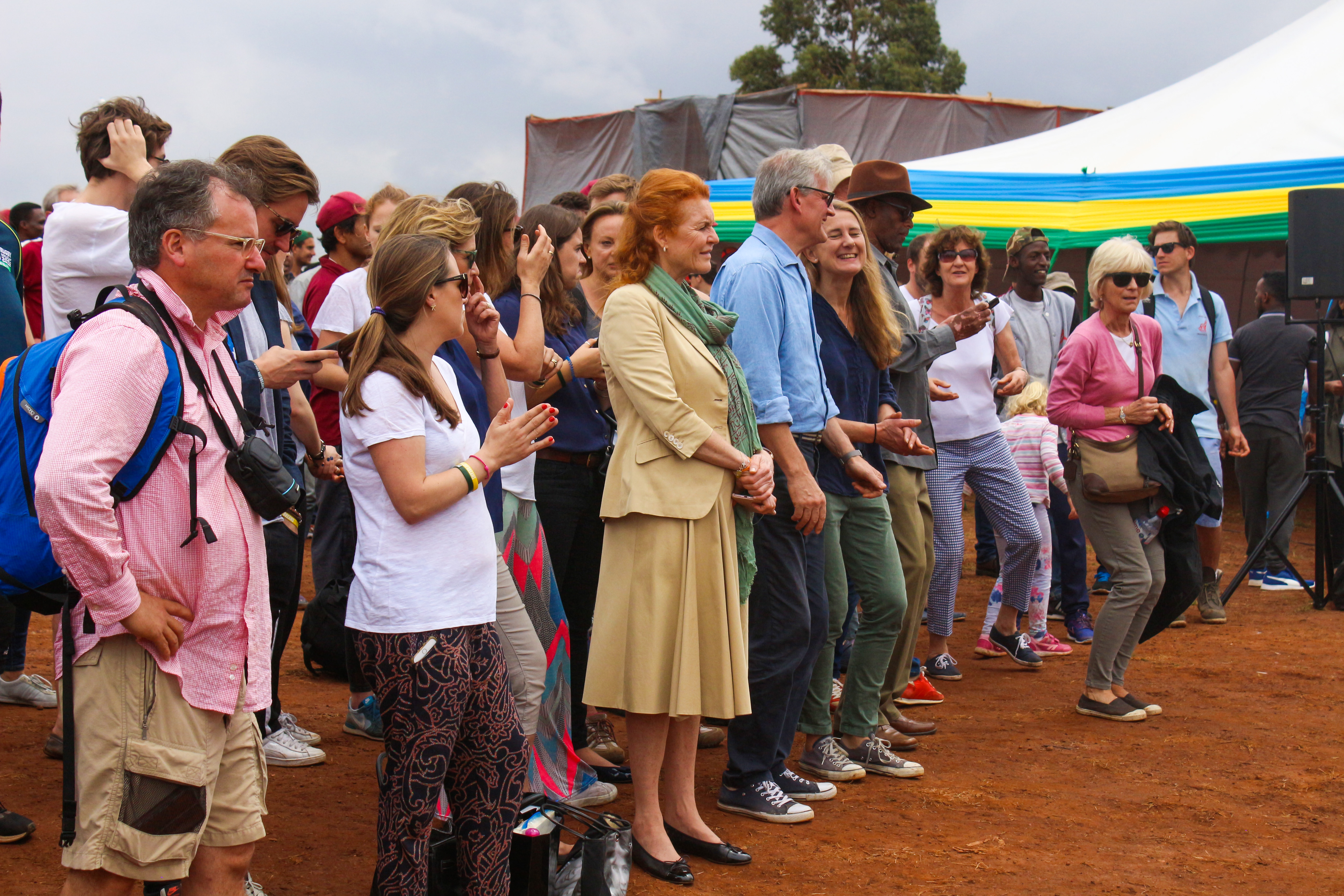
Sarah, Duchess of York and other people at the Gahanga International Cricket Stadium in 2017

== History ==
In August 2011, the Rwanda Cricket Stadium Foundation was formed as a charity, run on a not-for-profit basis, with the aim of building and managing the first ever dedicated international cricket ground in Rwanda. The ground was completed in March 2017. It is located on a 4.5-hectare (11-acre) site on the edge of Kigali, Rwanda's capital.

The charity was run by a team of cricket enthusiasts from the UK and Rwanda in partnership with the Marylebone Cricket Club Foundation. On 31st December 2025 the ownership of the ground was transferred to Rwanda Cricket Association.

In 2012, West Indian cricketing great Brian Lara agreed to become one of the ground's patrons. The stadium is also supported by former British Prime Minister David Cameron, Andrew Mitchell, Jonathan Agnew, Heather Knight, and Peter Gummer, Baron Chadlington.

In 2016, Rwanda captain Eric Dusingizimana achieved a Guinness World Record for batting 51 continuous hours at Amaharo Stadium in Remera. This was done to raise funds for the construction of the ground.

Once opened, the ground quickly gained prominence in African cricket and hosted various ICC events. In 2018, the ground was selected to host the matches in the 2018–19 ICC World Twenty20 Africa Qualifier Eastern Sub-Region group. Once all associate members were given T20I status in 2019, the ground hosted its first T20I on 18 August 2021.

The stadium also hosted the 2019 Kwibuka Women's T20 Tournament, a women's cricket tournament, in remembrance of the victims of the 1994 Rwandan genocide. Their successful hosting of multi-national tournaments during peak COVID-19 pandemic following the safety protocols had led to being given more tournaments subsequently.

In November 2022, the ground surpassed the Harare Sports Club as the cricket oval to host the most T20I matches in Africa. As of January 2026 it has hosted 128 T20I matches, and 91 women's T20I matches.

In September 2026, the ground was selected as the venue to host the ILT20 Africa Continent Cup 2026.

== Notable events ==
The following notable events were hosted here with ICC International Status:

- 2021 ICC Men's T20 World Cup Africa Qualifier
  - Qualifier A, Qualifier B, Regional Final
- 2022–23 ICC Men's T20 World Cup Africa Qualifier
  - Qualifier A, Qualifier B
- Kwibuka T20 Tournament
  - 2019, 2021, 2022, 2023 , ⁣2024 ⁣, ⁣2025
- 2022 East Africa T20 Series

=== Bilateral series ===
- Ghanaian cricket team in Rwanda in 2021

== International record ==
=== Twenty20 International centuries ===
Six T20I centuries have been scored at the venue.

No.	Score	Player	Team	Balls	Opposing team	Innings	Date	Result
1	100*	Orchide Tuyisenge	Rwanda	60	Seychelles	1	19 October 2021	Won
2	104	Francisco Couana	Mozambique	51	Cameroon	1	3 November 2021	Won
3	100	Vinoo Balakrishnan	Botswana	70	Saint Helena	1	25 November 2022	Won
4	107*	Obed Harvey	Ghana	54	Gambia	1	8 December 2022	Won
5	100*	Simon Ssesazi	Uganda	58	Tanzania	1	22 December 2022	Won
6	100*	Asif Ali	Bahrain	55	Uganda	1	22 July 2025	Won

=== Twenty20 International five-wicket hauls ===
Eight T20I five-wicket haul has been taken at this venue.

#	Figures	Player	Country	Innings	Opponent	Date	Result
1	5/23	Samson Awiah	Ghana	1	Rwanda	16 October 2021	Won
2	5/9	Kofi Bagabena	Ghana	1	Seychelles	16 October 2021	Won
3	5/26	Rexford Bakum	Ghana	2	Lesotho	17 October 2021	Won
4	5/19	Francisco Couana	Mozambique	2	Cameroon	3 November 2021	Won
5	5/9	Sylvester Okpe	Nigeria	1	Cameroon	5 December 2022	Won
6	5/29	Richmond Baaleri	Ghana	2	Gambia	8 December 2022	Won
7	5/17	Alpesh Ramjani	Uganda	1	Nigeria	6 December 2024	Won
8	5/8	Henry Ssenyondo	Uganda	1	Nigeria	8 December 2024	Won

=== Women's Twenty20 International centuries ===
Five WT20I centuries have been scored at the venue.

No.	Score	Player	Team	Balls	Opposing team	Innings	Date	Result
1	116	Prosscovia Alako	Uganda	71	Mali	1	20 June 2019	Won
2	103*	Rita Musamali	Uganda	61	Mali	1	20 June 2019	Won
3	114*	Marie Bimenyimana	Rwanda	81	Mali	1	21 June 2019	Won
4	108*	Fatuma Kibasu	Tanzania	71	Mali	1	22 June 2019	Won
5	100	Prosscovia Alako	Uganda	63	Cameroon	1	7 June 2024	Won

=== Women's Twenty20 International five-wicket hauls ===
Seven WT20I five-wicket haul has been taken at this venue.

#	Figures	Player	Country	Innings	Opponent	Date	Result
1	5/0	Nasra Saidi	Tanzania	2	Mali	22 June 2019	Won
2	5/12	Sarah Wetoto	Kenya	1	Botswana	7 June 2021	Won
3	6/16	Sarah Wetoto	Kenya	1	Namibia	12 June 2021	Won
4	6/7	Lillian Udeh	Nigeria	2	Rwanda	4 June 2024	Won
5	5/17	Henriette Ishimwe	Rwanda	1	Uganda	5 June 2024	Lost
6	6/8	Stephani Nampiina	Uganda	1	Malawi	8 June 2025	Won
7	5/6	Marie Bimenyimana	Rwanda	1	Tanzania	13 June 2025	Lost
