= Rwanda Cricket Association =

Sports governing body in Rwanda

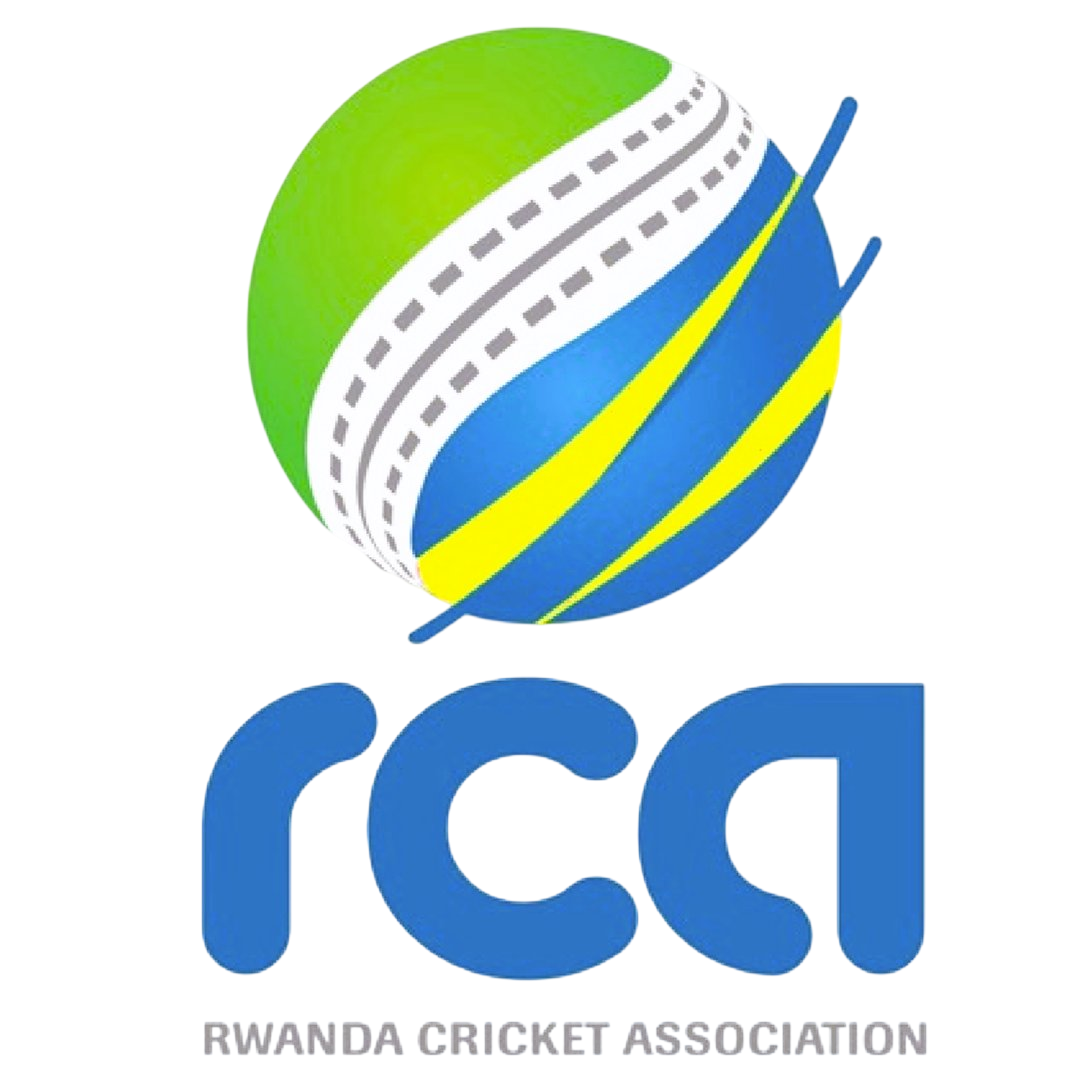
- Sport: Cricket
- Founded: 1999–2000
- Affiliation: International Cricket Council
- Affiliation date: 2003
- Regional affiliation: Africa
- Location: Kigali, Rwanda

Official website
- www.rwandacricket.rw
- (Rwanda)

Rwanda Cricket Association is the official governing body of the sport of cricket in Rwanda. Its headquarters is located in Kicukiro district in Kigali city.

Rwanda Cricket Association is Rwanda's representative at the International Cricket Council and is an associate member and has been a member of that body since 2003. It is also a member of the African Cricket Association.

Today, cricket is one of the fastest-growing sports in Rwanda. The game was first introduced in the country after the 1994 Genocide against the Tutsi, following the return of many Rwandans who had been exiled in English-speaking cricket-playing neighboring countries – such as Kenya, Tanzania and Uganda.

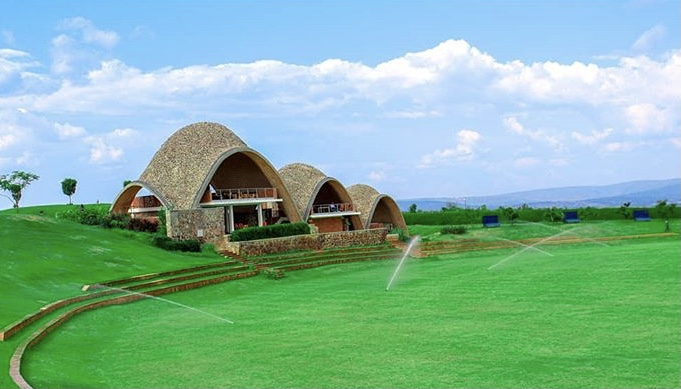
Gahanga Cricket Stadium

Most of these exiles were students and played the game while pursuing their studies at the National University of Rwanda (now University of Rwanda). IPRC Kigali later became the home of cricket and went on to host several league and schools cricket competitions before the establishment of Gahanga Cricket Stadium; the first international stadium in 2017. Charles Haba, one of the pioneers of the game at the National University of Rwanda went on to become the first President of the Association which was founded between 1999 and 2000.

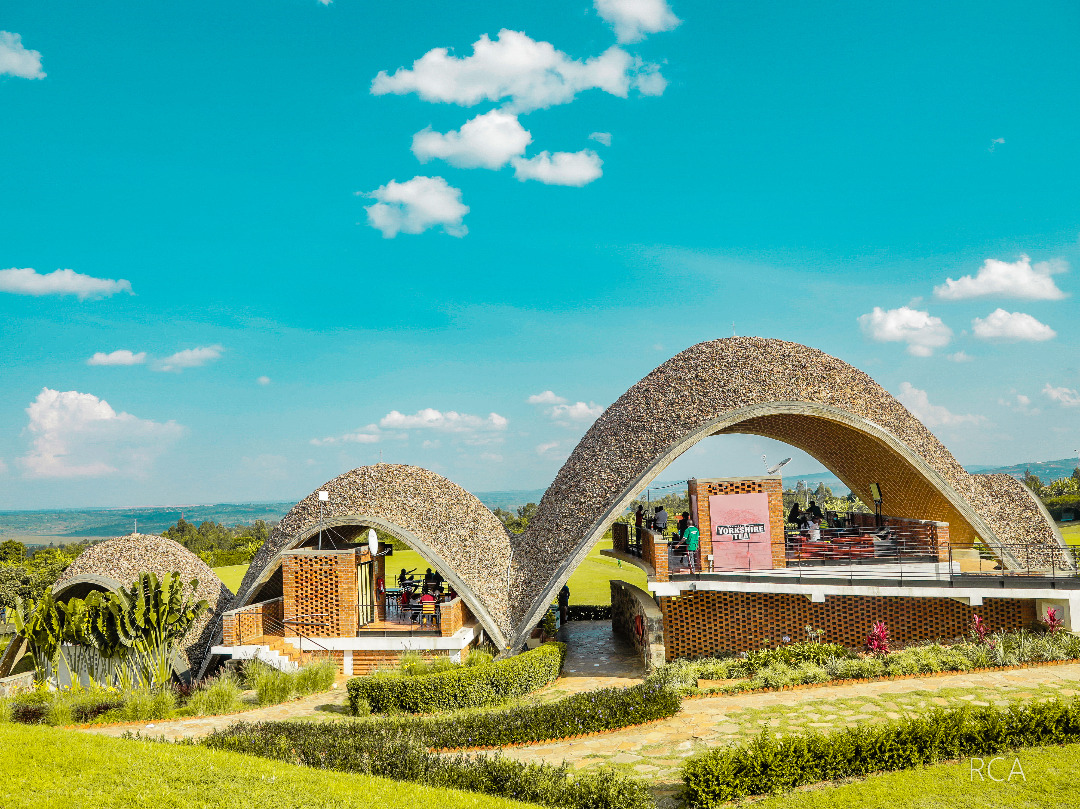
Gahanga Cricket stadium in Kicukiro

The game is now played by over 23,010 people across the country. RCA’s annual calendar includes international competitions, domestic club competitions (50-over league, T20 league and most recently a T10 league which attracts the country’s top clubs).

Other regular competitions include the schools’ competition and a university competition.

Emmanuel Byiringiro is the General Manager of RCA.

Landry Rurangwa is the Development Manager.

== Key milestones ==
In 2003, Rwanda Cricket Association became an affiliate member of the International Cricket Council (ICC)

In 2004, Rwanda made its debut at an ICC tournament when the national senior men’s team participated in the ICC Africa Affiliates Championship in Benoni, South Africa.

In 2010, Rwanda Cricket Association celebrated its 10-year anniversary.

In 2011, Rwanda were crowned champions of the ICC T20 Africa Division 3 tournament.

In 2017, Rwanda Cricket Association inaugurated Gahanga Cricket Stadium; the first international standard Stadium in Rwanda.

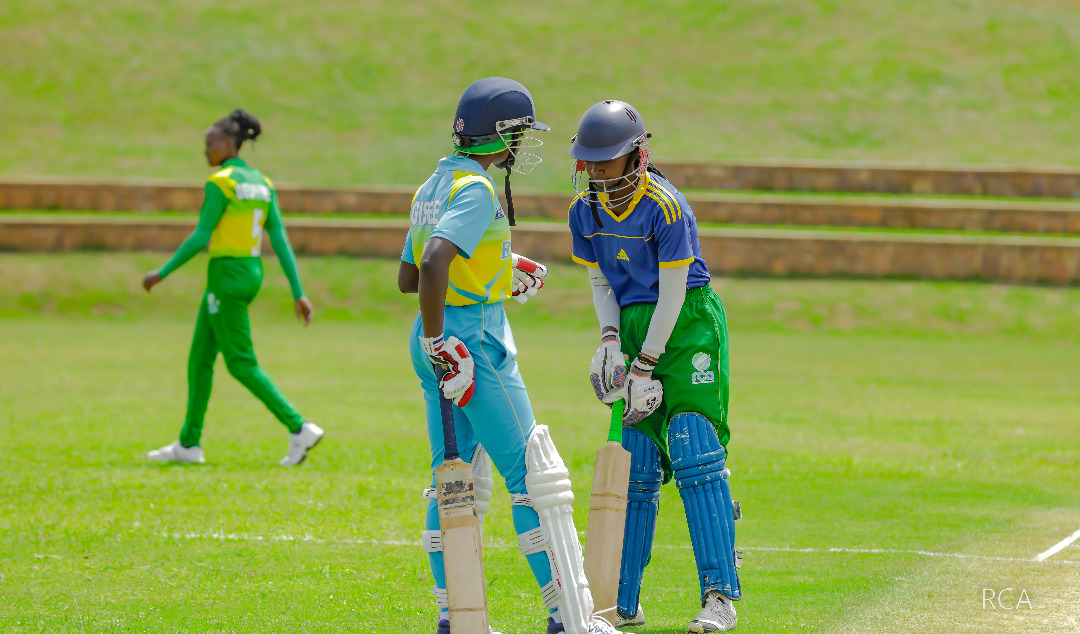
Rwanda female cricket players

In 2018, Rwanda hosted the World T20 Africa B Qualifier.

In 2019, Rwanda hosted the ICC World Cup Trophy.

In July 2020, Rwanda Cricket Association won the 100% Cricket Participation Programme of the Year award, in the ICC's Annual Development Awards.

In 2022, Rwanda hosted the 2022-23 ICC T20 World Cup Africa Qualifier.

In 2023, Rwanda Under-19 women's team participated in the ICC Women's Under-19 T20 World Cup in South Africa. They managed to get in to the Super 6 after defeating Zimbabwe in the group stage. They also created history by defeating West Indies in the Super 6 by 4 wickets.

The national senior women’s team is ranked 7th in Africa

2021- update:

Due to the COVID-19 pandemic, most sports activities were cancelled. However, Rwanda Cricket Association is set to hold the annual Kwibuka T20 Tournament at Gahanga Cricket Oval in June 2021. Five national teams are expected at the event.

== Board Members ==
President – Mr Stephen Musaale

Vice President - Mr Audifax Byiringiro

General Secretary - Mr Julius Mbaraga

Treasurer - Mr Srinath Vardhineni

Women Representative – Ms. Sonia Uwimana

== Awards ==
Year	Award
2014	ICC Spirit of Cricket
2015	ICC Global Development Image
2017	ICC Spirit of Cricket
2018	ICC Best Women’s Cricket Initiative
2019	ICC Africa Good Governance
2020	100% Cricket Participation Programme of the Year

== Ground ==
Gahanga Cricket Stadium and IPRC Cricket Ground are the main cricket grounds in Rwanda.

In August 2011, Rwanda Cricket Stadium Foundation was formed to build and manage, on a not-for-profit basis, the first dedicated international cricket ground in Rwanda. The stadium sits on 4.5-hectares on the outskirts of Kigali, Rwanda's capital.

The charity is run by a team of cricket enthusiasts from the UK Christopher Shale and Rwanda in partnership with the Marylebone Cricket Club Foundation.

In 2012, Brian Lara agreed to join a decorated list of patrons; British Prime Minister David Cameron, Andrew Mitchell, Jonathan Agnew, Heather Knight and Peter Gummer, Baron Chadlington

Gahanga Cricket Stadium was officially launched in 2017.

== See also ==
- Rwanda national cricket team
- Rwanda women's national cricket team
- Rwanda national under-19 cricket team
- Rwanda women's national under-19 cricket team
