= Rwanda national cricket team =

Cricket team

Rwanda
- Association: Rwanda Cricket Association

Personnel
- Captain: Clinton Rubagumya
- Coach: Lawrence Mahatlane

International Cricket Council
- ICC status: Associate member (2017)
- ICC region: Africa
ICC Rankings	Current	Best-ever
T20I	55th	55th (30 May 2026)

International cricket
- First international: 21 March 2004 vs Mozambique at Willowmoore Park, Benoni

T20 Internationals
- First T20I: v Ghana at Gahanga International Cricket Stadium, Kigali; 18 August 2021
- Last T20I: v Uganda at Gahanga International Cricket Stadium, Kigali; 17 September 2026
T20Is	Played	Won/Lost
Total	140	51/86 (1 tie, 2 no results)
This year	21	14/7 (0 ties, 0 no results)
- T20 World Cup Qualifier appearances: 1 (Note: T20 World Cup Qualifier refers to the Regional Final of the ICC Africa region from the 2023 edition.) (first in 2023)
- Best result: 7th (2023)
T20I kit
- As of 17 September 2026

The Rwandan national cricket team represents Rwanda in international cricket. They became an affiliate member of the International Cricket Council (ICC) in 2003 and an associate member in 2017. The team's first international tournament was the African Affiliates Championship in 2004, where they finished seventh.

== History ==
=== 2000-2008 ===
2004 marked the genesis of Rwanda national team's participation in regional and international tournaments, their very first being the African Affiliates Championship in 2004, where they finished seventh in South Africa. In 2006 they competed in Division Three of the African region of the World Cricket League, improving their performance and finishing in sixth. They remained in Division Three in 2008.

In 2008, they participated in the ICC World Cricket League Africa Region Division Three hosted by South Africa and reached semi finals.

=== 2009-2015 ===
In 2009, the national team participated in the African Cricket World Cup qualifiers in Malawi and in the ICC Africa Twenty20 Division Three in 2011 hosted by Ghana and emerged as the winners against Seychelles.

=== 2015-2020 ===
In 2016, captain Eric Dusingizimana set a world record for the longest individual net session in an attempt to raise funds for the construction of a new cricket stadium.

In 2017, they became an associate member of the ICC.

In April 2018, the ICC decided to grant full Twenty20 International (T20I) status to all its members. Therefore, all Twenty20 matches played between Rwanda and other ICC members since 1 January 2019 have the T20I status.

In March 2018 the Rwanda Cricket Association named former Kenyan international Martin Suji as head coach on an initial four-month contract, encompassing the 2018–19 ICC World Twenty20 Africa Qualifier Eastern Subregion tournament.

18 August 2021
09:30
Scorecard

Ghana; 164/5 (20 overs)	v	Rwanda; 165/9 (19.4 overs)
Amoluk Singh 58 (40); Zappy Bimenyimana 2/32 (4 overs)		Martin Akayezu 51 (19); Godfred Bakiweyem 3/28 (3.4 overs)

Rwanda won by 1 wicket
Gahanga International Cricket Stadium, Kigali
Player of the match: Martin Akayezu (Rwa)

- Ghana won the toss and elected to bat.
- First T20I match for Rwanda.

== Gallery ==
Rwanda national cricket team players

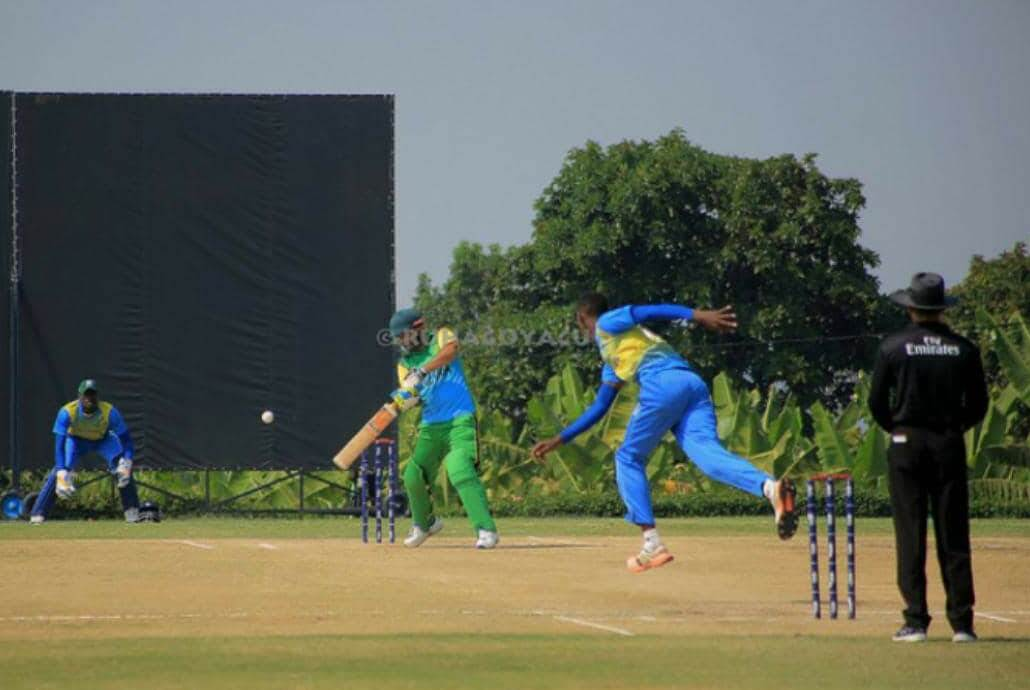

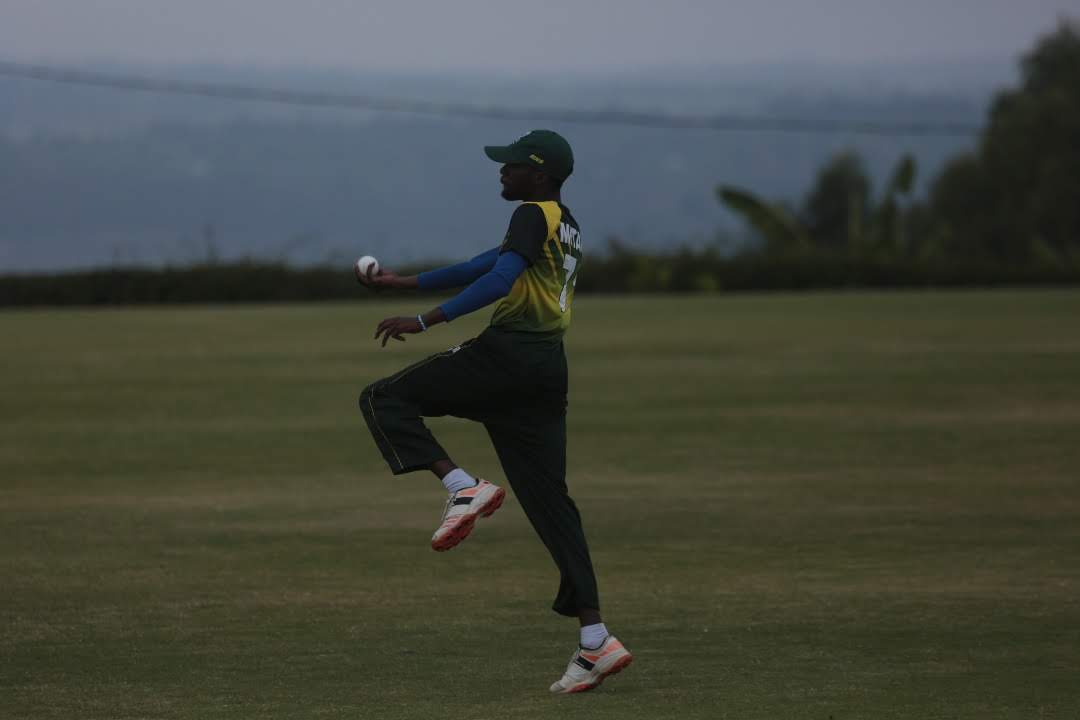

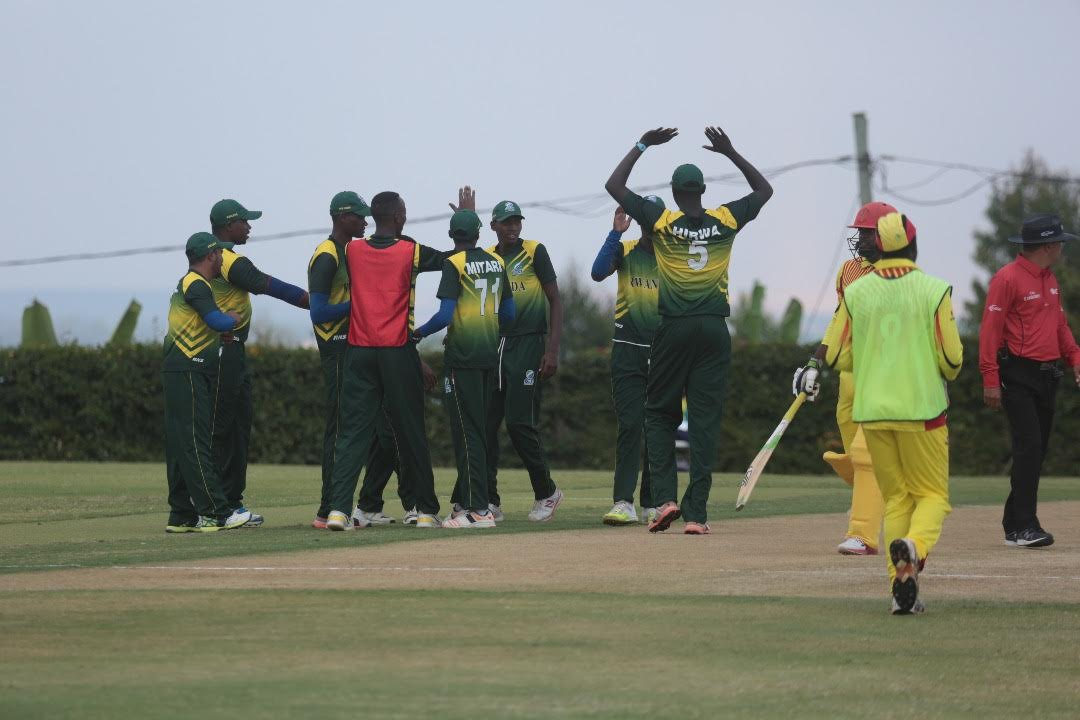

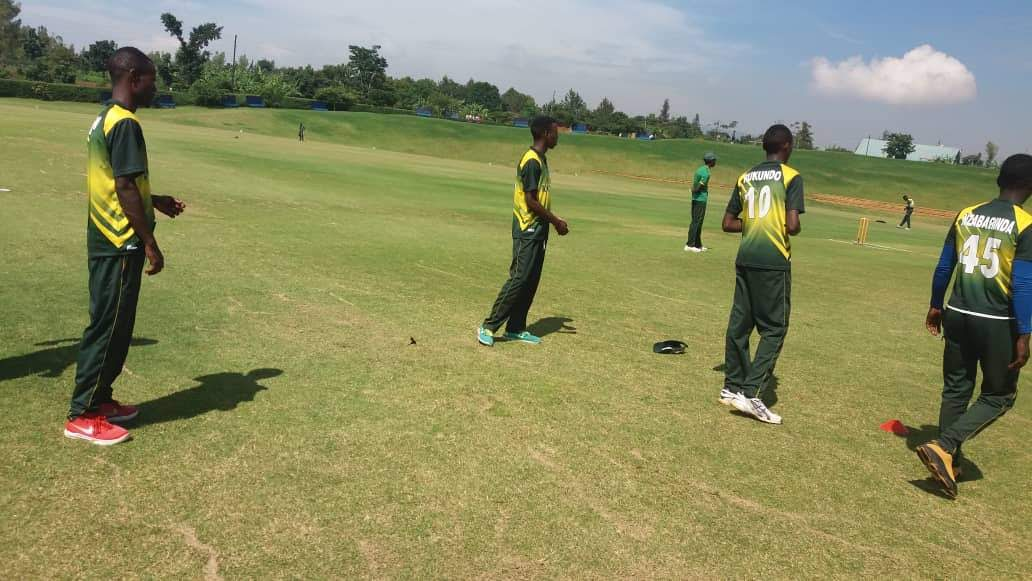

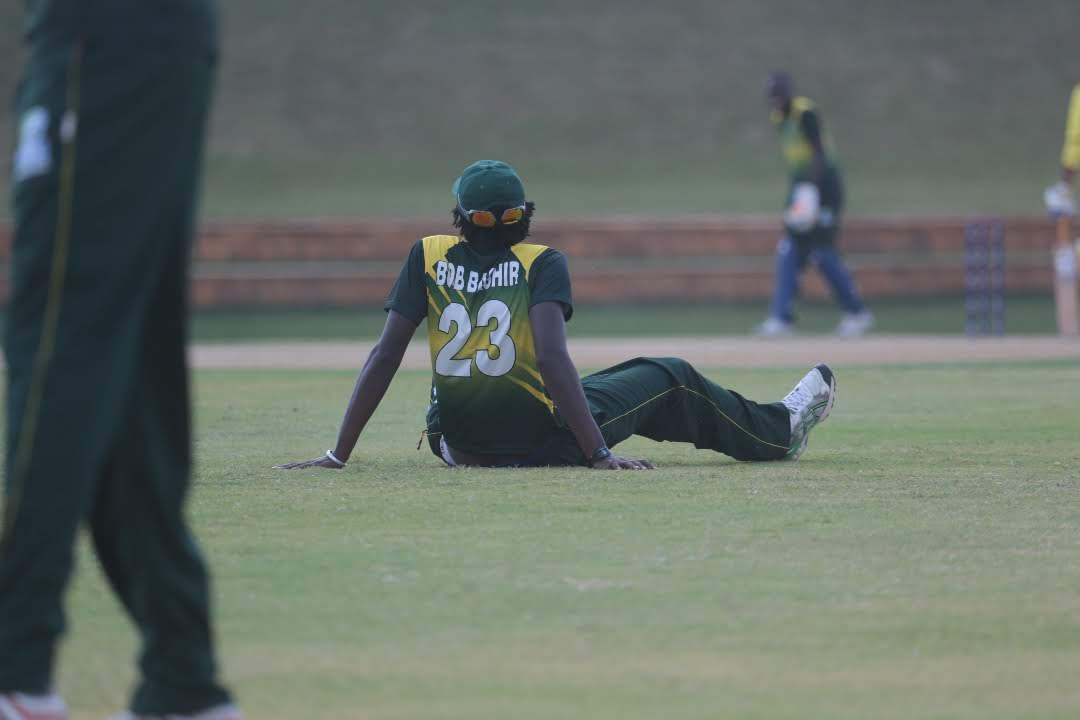

== Grounds ==
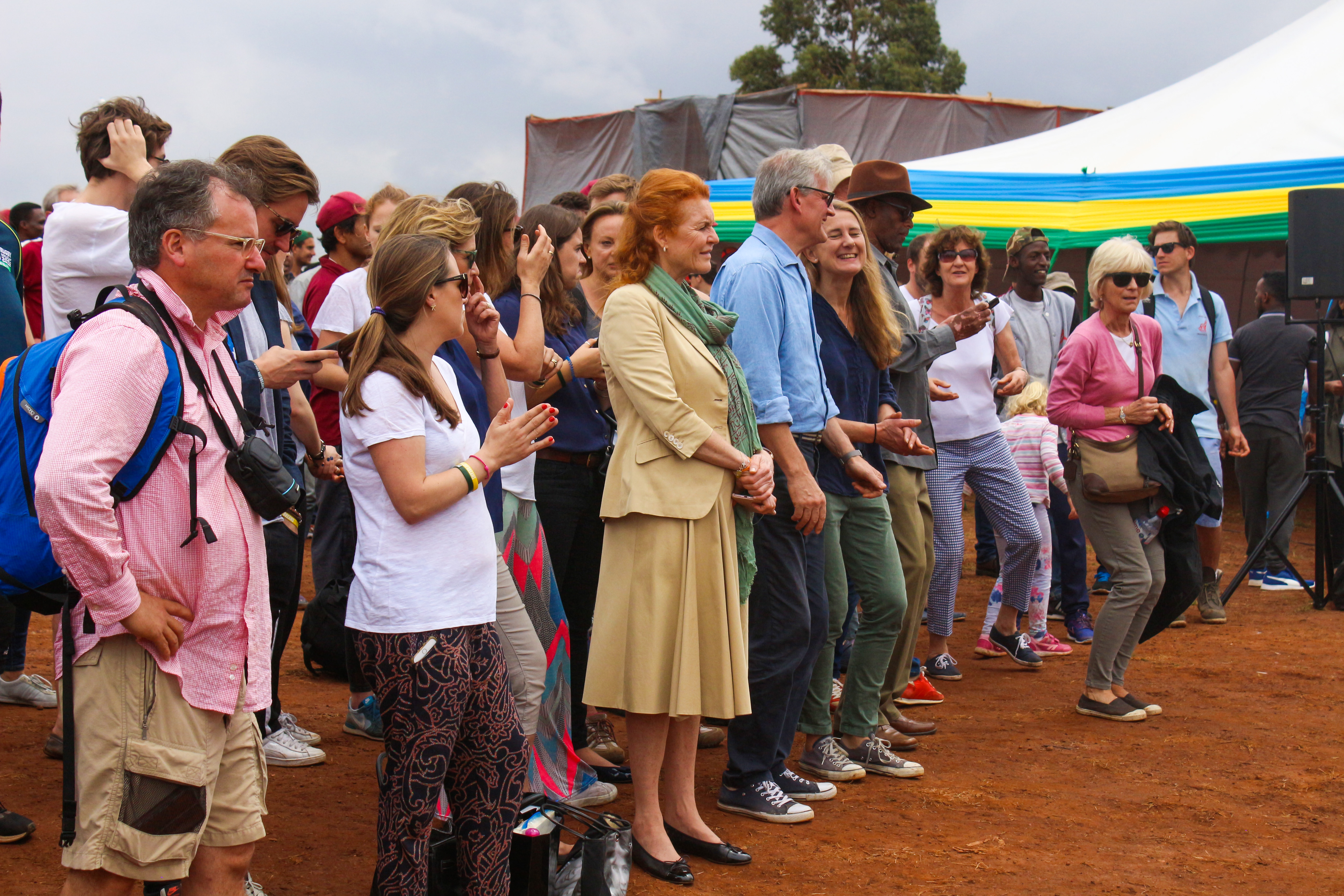
People at the Gahanga International Cricket Stadium in 2017

Gahanga International Cricket Stadium and Kicukiro Oval located in IPRC Kigali former ETO Kicukiro are the main cricket grounds in Kigali. In August 2011, Rwanda Cricket Stadium Foundation was formed to build and manage, on a not-for-profit basis, the first dedicated international cricket ground in Rwanda. It is located on a 4.5-hectare site on the edge of Kigali, Rwanda's capital.

The charity is run by a team of cricket enthusiasts from the UK Christopher Shale and Rwanda in partnership with the Marylebone Cricket Club Foundation. The ground was expected to be completed in 2014.

The construction of Rwanda's first dedicated cricket ground will provide a permanent home for the sport, helping its development and increasing opportunity for thousands of disadvantaged young people.

In 2012, Brian Lara agreed to become one of the patrons. The stadium is also supported by former British Prime Minister David Cameron, Andrew Mitchell, Jonathan Agnew, Heather Knight, Peter Gummer, Baron Chadlington

=== Facilities ===
- An international-standard cricket ground (one Astroturf wicket; several grass wickets)
- Pavilion (with restaurant, bar and conference facilities)
- Six cricket nets
- Modest spectator seating
- Car parking (c. 80 spaces)
- Soft (green) landscaping
Locations of all stadiums which have hosted cricket matches within Rwanda

== Current squad ==
This lists all the players who have played for Rwanda in the past 12 months or has been part of the latest T20I squad. Updated as of 24 October 2024.

Name	Age	Batting style	Bowling style	Notes
Batters
Oscar Manishimwe	24	Right-handed		
Hamza Khan	28	Right-handed	Right-arm off break	
Orchide Tuyisenge	26	Right-handed		
Wilson Niyitanga	25	Right-handed		
Daniel Gumyusenge	23	Right-handed	Right-arm medium	
Isae Niyomugabe	23	Right-handed		
All-rounders
Clinton Rubagumya	30	Right-handed	Right-arm medium	Captain
Yves Cyusa	19	Right-handed	Right-arm off break	
Wicket-keeper
Didier Ndikubwimana	23	Right-handed		Vice-captain
Spin Bowlers
Muhammad Nadir	28	Left-handed	Slow left-arm orthodox	
Emmanuel Sebareme	30	Right-handed	Right-arm off break	
Emile Rukiriza	23	Right-handed	Right-arm off break	
Kevin Irakoze	26	Right-handed	Right-arm off break	
Israel Mugisha	21	Right-handed	Right-arm leg break	
Pace Bowlers
Zappy Bimenyimana	38	Right-handed	Right-arm medium	
Martin Akayezu	24	Right-handed	Right-arm medium	
Ignace Ntirenganya	24	Right-handed	Left-arm medium	
Eric Kubwimana	24	Right-handed	Right-arm medium	

== Tournament history ==
=== Twenty20 World Cup Africa Qualifier Regional Final ===
Twenty20 World Cup Africa Qualifier record
Year	Round	Position	GP	W	L	T	NR
(Uganda) 2019	Did not qualify						
(Rwanda) 2021	Did not qualify						
(Namibia) 2022–23	Round-robin	7/7	6	0	5	0	1
(Zimbabwe) 2025	Did not qualify						
Total	1/3	–	6	0	5	0	1

=== T20 World Cup Africa Sub-regional Qualifier ===
T20 World Cup Africa Sub-regional Qualifier record
Year	Round	Position	GP	W	L	T	NR
(Rwanda) 2021	Round-robin	4/7	6	3	3	0	0
(Rwanda) 2022–23	Runners-up (Q)	2/8	7	5	1	0	1
(Kenya) 2024	Round-robin	4/6	5	2	3	0	0
(Botswana) 2026	Champions (A)	1/7	6	6	0	0	0
Total	4/4	1 Title	24	16	7	0	1

== Records and statistics ==
International Match Summary — Rwanda

Last updated 17 September 2026

Playing Record
Format	M	W	L	T	NR	Inaugural Match
Twenty20 Internationals	140	51	86	1	2	18 August 2021

=== Twenty20 International ===
- Highest team total: 288/2 v. Ivory Coast, 24 May 2026 at Botswana Cricket Association Oval 1, Gaborone.
- Highest individual score: 164*, Hamza Khan v. Ivory Coast, 24 May 2026 at Botswana Cricket Association Oval 1, Gaborone.
- Best individual bowling figures: 5/11, Emile Rukiriza v. Malawi, 9 October 2024 at TCA Oval, Blantyre.

Most T20I runs for Rwanda

Player	Runs	Average	Career span
Didier Ndikubwimana	2,076	19.77	2021–2026
Oscar Manishimwe	1,406	17.14	2021–2026
Orchide Tuyisenge	1,354	16.71	2021–2024
Hamza Khan	1,343	28.57	2023–2026
Eric Dusingizimana	1,028	18.03	2021–2024

Most T20I wickets for Rwanda

Player	Wickets	Average	Career span
Martin Akayezu	117	21.42	2021–2026
Zappy Bimenyimana	102	22.98	2021–2026
Muhammad Nadir	96	16.16	2023–2026
Emile Rukiriza	95	18.69	2023–2026
Kevin Irakoze	74	19.13	2021–2024

T20I record versus other nations

Records complete to T20I #4126. Last updated 17 September 2026.

Opponent	M	W	L	T	NR	First match	First win
vs Full Members
Zimbabwe	2	0	2	0	0	27 November 2023	
vs Associate Members
Bahrain	4	0	4	0	0	18 July 2025	
Botswana	10	8	2	0	0	17 November 2022	17 November 2022
Cameroon	1	1	0	0	0	23 May 2026	23 May 2026
Eswatini	1	1	0	0	0	22 October 2021	22 October 2021
Gambia	1	1	0	0	0	8 December 2023	8 December 2023
Ghana	10	5	4	1	0	18 August 2021	18 August 2021
Ivory Coast	1	1	0	0	0	24 May 2026	24 May 2026
Kenya	12	1	11	0	0	20 November 2022	25 May 2026
Lesotho	2	1	0	0	1	21 October 2021	21 October 2021
Malawi	18	9	9	0	0	22 October 2021	21 November 2022
Mali	2	2	0	0	0	24 November 2022	24 November 2022
Mozambique	2	0	2	0	0	17 December 2023	
Namibia	1	0	1	0	0	25 November 2023	
Nigeria	12	2	9	0	1	4 October 2023	9 December 2024
Saint Helena	1	1	0	0	0	18 November 2022	18 November 2022
Seychelles	3	3	0	0	0	19 October 2021	19 October 2021
Sierra Leone	9	8	1	0	0	6 October 2023	6 October 2023
Tanzania	18	2	16	0	0	31 October 2022	16 December 2022
Uganda	23	1	22	0	0	17 October 2021	11 December 2023
Zambia	7	4	3	0	0	5 December 2025	5 December 2025

=== Other matches ===
For a list of selected international matches played by Rwanda, see Cricket Archive.

== See also ==
- List of Rwanda Twenty20 International cricketers
