= 2023 ACA Africa T20 Cup Qualification =

Cricket tournament

The 2023 ACA Africa T20 Cup Qualification process consisted of a series of two cricket tournaments, organised by the Africa Cricket Association, that determined the eight teams that advanced to the 2023 ACA Africa T20 Cup.

The first tournament was the Southern Africa Cup (covering the south and central region), which was played at Willowmoore Park in Benoni, South Africa, in May 2023.

The Northern Africa Cup (covering the northwest region) was originally scheduled to be played in June 2023 in Abuja, Nigeria, and the East Africa Cup was originally to be hosted in Kampala, Uganda, in July 2023. The later two events were eventually combined into a single event (North-West/East Qualifier), and scheduled to be played in September 2023. However, the qualifier and the finals were postponed again. The qualifier was played in December 2023.

Uganda won the inaugural ACA Africa T20 Cup, where they defeated Tanzania in the final in September 2022. Defending champions Uganda, plus the top three sides from the Southern Africa Cup and the top four sides from the North-West/East Qualifier qualified for the 2023 ACA Africa T20 Cup.

Rwanda and Kenya topped their groups in the North-West/East qualifier to claim a place at the ACA Cup Finals. Sierra Leone and Ghana also qualified after finishing as runners-up in their groups.

== Southern Africa Cup ==
2023 Southern Africa Cup
- Dates: 27 May – 1 June 2023
- Administrator: African Cricket Association
- Cricket format: 20 overs, Twenty20 International
- Tournament format: Round-robin
- Host: South Africa
- Champions: Botswana
- Runners-up: Malawi
- Participants: 5
- Matches: 10
- Player of the series: (Botswana) Karabo Motlhanka
- Most runs: (Malawi) Sami Sohail (146)
- Most wickets: (Malawi) Sami Sohail (11)

=== Squads ===
Botswana	Eswatini	Malawi	Mauritius	Mozambique
Karabo Motlhanka (c); Vinoo Balakrishnan; Boemo Kgosiemang; Boemo Khumalo; Dhruv Maisuria; Losika Makgale; Boteng Maphosa; Valentine Mbazo (wk); Karabo Modise; Mmoloki Mooketsi; Reginald Nehonde; Katlo Piet; Ameer Saiyed; Phemelo Silas; Thatayaone Tshose	Adil Butt (c); Mohammed Alamgir; Muhammad Amin; Safwan Barediya; Christiaan Forbes; Hujeifa Jangariya (wk); Mancoba Jele; Siphesihle Kubheka; Wesley Landman; Faizalmahmed Patel; Shehzad Patel (wk); Umair Qasim; Haris Rashid; Tarun Sandeep (wk)	Moazzam Baig (c); Donnex Kansonkho (vc); Bright Balala; Chisomo Chete (wk); Waliyu Jackson; Daniel Jakiel; Alick Kansonkho; Gift Kansonkho; Aaftab Limdawala; Francis Nkhoma; Gershom Ntambalika; Blessings Pondani; Sami Sohail; Suhail Vayani	Mark Segers (c); Abdul Tunda (vc); Stephen Brown; Cristopher Erasmus (wk); Alamin Hossain; Nabeel Iftikhar; Vineshbhai Patel; Thomas Poucke; Nuwan Prasad; James Rambo; Hitesh Rao; Manish Sharma (wk); David Stedall; Craig Warren	Filipe Cossa (c); Manussur Algi; Eugenio Azine; Armando Chuvale; Francisco Couana; Joao Huo; Jose Joao; Dario Macome; Luis Mavume; Agostinho Navicha; Camate Raposo; Lourenco Salomone; Bernardo Sambo (wk); Vieira Tembo (wk)

=== Points table ===
Pos	Team	Pld	W	L	NR	Pts	NRR	Qualification
1	Botswana	4	4	0	0	8	3.731	Qualified for the 2023 ACA Africa T20 Cup
2	Malawi	4	3	1	0	6	0.650	Qualified for the 2023 ACA Africa T20 Cup
3	Mozambique	4	1	3	0	2	−1.213	Qualified for the 2023 ACA Africa T20 Cup
4	Mauritius	4	1	3	0	2	−1.382	
5	Eswatini	4	1	3	0	2	−1.602	

Source: ESPNcricinfo

=== Fixtures ===
27 May 2023
08:00
Scorecard

Mozambique; 106/7 (20 overs)	v	Mauritius; 107/7 (19.4 overs)
Francisco Couana 42 (47); Hitesh Rao 4/22 (4 overs)		Cristopher Erasmus 31 (32); Francisco Couana 2/11 (3.4 overs)

Mauritius won by 3 wickets
Willowmoore Park, Benoni
Umpires: Alpheus Gawe (SA) and Gert van Wyk (SA)
Player of the match: Hitesh Rao (Mri)

- Mauritius won the toss and elected to field.

27 May 2023
12:30
Scorecard

Malawi; 155/5 (20 overs)	v	Eswatini; 102 (15.5 overs)
Sami Sohail 75 (51); Haris Rashid 1/17 (4 overs)		Hujeifa Jangariya 23 (19); Sami Sohail 3/8 (3 overs)

Malawi won by 53 runs
Willowmoore Park, Benoni
Umpires: Acacio Chitsondzo (Moz) and Alpheus Gawe (SA)
Player of the match: Sami Sohail (Mwi)

- Eswatini won the toss and elected to field.
- Hujeifa Jangariya, Wesley Landman, Faizalmahmed Patel (Esw) and Suhail Vayani (Mwi) all made their T20I debuts.

28 May 2023
08:00
Scorecard

Mauritius; 112/8 (20 overs)	v	Botswana; 113/3 (16.2 overs)
James Rambo 39 (40); Dhruv Maisuria 3/23 (4 overs)		Karabo Motlhanka 32* (29); Nuwan Prasad 2/25 (3.2 overs)

Botswana won by 7 wickets
Willowmoore Park, Benoni
Umpires: Acacio Chitsondzo (Moz) and Gert van Wyk (SA)
Player of the match: Dhruv Maisuria (Bot)

- Mauritius won the toss and elected to bat.

28 May 2023
12:30
Scorecard

Mozambique; 61/9 (20 overs)	v	Malawi; 62/1 (11.1 overs)
Jose Joao 18 (20); Sami Sohail 4/6 (4 overs)		Sami Sohail 30* (30); Joao Hou 1/15 (4 overs)

Malawi won by 9 wickets
Willowmoore Park, Benoni
Umpires: Alpheus Gawe (SA) and Gert van Wyk (SA)
Player of the match: Sami Sohail (Mwi)

- Malawi won the toss and elected to field.

29 May 2023
08:00
Scorecard

Botswana; 205/5 (20 overs)	v	Eswatini; 98 (19.1 overs)
Thatayaone Tshose 60 (28); Mancoba Jele 3/23 (3 overs)		Tarun Sandeep 22 (31); Dhruv Maisuria 3/20 (4 overs)

Botswana won by 107 runs
Willowmoore Park, Benoni
Umpires: Acacio Chitsondzo (Moz) and Alpheus Gawe (SA)
Player of the match: Thatayaone Tshose (Bot)

- Eswatini won the toss and elected to field.
- Losika Makgale (Bot) and Safwan Barediya (Esw) both made their T20I debuts.

29 May 2023
12:30
Scorecard

Malawi; 141/5 (20 overs)	v	Mauritius; 96 (19.5 overs)
Sami Sohail 35 (34); David Stedall 2/33 (4 overs)		Stephen Brown 29 (35); Moazzam Baig 3/13 (4 overs)

Malawi won by 45 runs
Willowmoore Park, Benoni
Umpires: Acacio Chitsondzo (Moz) and Gert van Wyk (SA)
Player of the match: Moazzam Baig (Mwi)

- Malawi won the toss and elected to bat.

30 May 2023
08:00
Scorecard

Botswana; 169/3 (20 overs)	v	Malawi; 69 (19.2 overs)
Karabo Motlhanka 53* (41); Sami Sohail 2/22 (4 overs)		Moazzam Baig 13 (16); Dhruv Maisuria 3/13 (4 overs)

Botswana won by 100 runs
Willowmoore Park, Benoni
Umpires: Acacio Chitsondzo (Moz) and Alpheus Gawe (SA)
Player of the match: Dhruv Maisuria (Bot)

- Malawi won the toss and elected to field.

30 May 2023
12:30
Scorecard

Eswatini; 127/8 (20 overs)	v	Mozambique; 132/4 (20 overs)
Tarun Sandeep 29* (14); Dario Macome 3/18 (4 overs)		Filipe Cossa 63* (42); Umair Qasim 2/25 (4 overs)

Mozambique won by 6 wickets
Willowmoore Park, Benoni
Umpires: Alpheus Gawe (SA) and Gert van Wyk (SA)
Player of the match: Filipe Cossa (Moz)

- Mozambique won the toss and elected to field.

1 June 2023
08:00
Scorecard

Mozambique; 89/7 (20 overs)	v	Botswana; 92/3 (13.1 overs)
Filipe Cossa 20 (23); Katlo Piet 2/13 (4 overs)		Reginald Nehonde 34* (25); Camate Raposo 1/13 (1.1 overs)

Botswana won by 7 wickets
Willowmoore Park, Benoni
Umpires: Alpheus Gawe (SA) and Gert van Wyk (SA)
Player of the match: Katlo Piet (Bot)

- Mozambique won the toss and elected to bat.

1 June 2023
12:30
Scorecard

Mauritius; 142/7 (20 overs)	v	Eswatini; 143/5 (14.2 overs)
Stephen Brown 55 (49); Adil Butt 2/24 (4 overs)		Adil Butt 50 (22); Nabeel Iftikhar 2/27 (4 overs)

Eswatini won by 5 wickets
Willowmoore Park, Benoni
Umpires: Acacio Chitsondzo (Moz) and Gert van Wyk (SA)
Player of the match: Adil Butt (Esw)

- Mauritius won the toss and elected to bat.

== North-West/East Qualifier ==
2023 ACA Cup North-West/East Qualifier
- Dates: 6 – 10 December 2023
- Administrator: African Cricket Association
- Cricket format: Twenty20 International
- Host: South Africa
- Participants: 7
- Matches: 9
- Most runs: (Ghana) Alex Osei (93)
- Most wickets: (Sierra Leone) Chernoh Bah (9) (Kenya) Vishil Patel (9)

=== Squads ===
Cameroon	Gambia	Ghana	Kenya	Mali	Rwanda	Sierra Leone
Julien Abega (c); Idriss Tchakou (vc, wk); Protais Abanda; Roland Amah; Abdoulaye Aminou (wk); Roger Atangana; Alexis Balla; Veron Bomnyuy; Kulbhushan Jadhav; Dipita Loic; Appolinaire Mengoumou; Narcisse Ndouteng; Alain Toube (wk); Bruno Toube	Ismaila Tamba (c); Ousman Bah (wk); Modou Bojang; Frank Campbell; Peter Campbell (wk); Aniru Conteh; David Demba; Andre Jarju; Musa Jobarteh; Abubacarr Kuyateh; Muhammed Manga; Gabriel Riley; Mustapha Suwareh; Fallou Thorpe; Ousman Touray	Samson Awiah (c); Daniel Anefie; Kelvin Awala; Richmoond Baaleri; Kofi Bagabena; Godfred Bakiweyem; Rexford Bakum; Obed Harvey; Alex Osei; Aziz Sualley; Joseph Theodore (wk); James Vifah; Philip Yevugah	Lucas Oluoch (c); Sachin Bhudia; Emmanuel Bundi; Irfan Karim (wk); Neil Mugabe; Francis Mutua; Gerard Mwendwa; Shem Ngoche; Collins Obuya; Nelson Odhiambo; Rushab Patel; Vishil Patel; Vraj Patel; Pushkar Sharma; Sukhdeep Singh (wk)	Cheick Keita (c); Lassina Berthe; Mohamed Coulibaly; Mahamadou Diaby; Sekou Diaby; Moustapha Diakite; Mamadou Diawara; Sanze Kamate; Theodore Macalou; Zakaria Makadji (wk); Mahamadou Malle; Lamissa Sanogo; Mamadou Sidibe; Daouda Traore (wk)	Clinton Rubagumya (c); Kevin Irakoze (vc); Martin Akayezu; Zappy Bimenyimana; Eric Dusingizimana; Hamza Khan; Eric Kubwimana; Oscar Manishimwe (wk); Muhammad Nadir; Didier Ndikubwimana (wk); Wilson Niyitanga; Eric Niyomugaba; Emile Rukiriza; Emmanuel Sebareme; Orchide Tuyisenge	George Ngegba (c); Chernoh Bah; John Bangura (wk); Raymond Coker; Samuel Conteh; Abass Gbla; Yegbeh Jalloh; Ibrahim Kamara; Miniru Kpaka; Lansana Lamin; John Lassayo; George Sesay; Ibrahim Sesay; Alusine Turay

=== Group A ===
==== Points table ====
Pos	Team	Pld	W	L	NR	Pts	NRR	Qualification
1	Rwanda	2	2	0	0	4	1.852	Qualified for the 2023 ACA Africa T20 Cup
2	Ghana	2	1	1	0	2	1.698	Qualified for the 2023 ACA Africa T20 Cup
3	Gambia	2	0	2	0	0	−4.128	

Source: ESPNcricinfo

==== Fixtures ====
8 December 2023
09:00
Scorecard

Gambia; 57 (15.5 overs)	v	Rwanda; 61/6 (11.5 overs)
Frank Campbell 23 (30); Clinton Rubagumya 3/5 (4 overs)		Clinton Rubagumya 21* (28); Abubacarr Kuyateh 3/19 (4 overs)

Rwanda won by 4 wickets
Willowmoore Park, Benoni
Umpires: Kobus Conradie (SA) and Gert van Wyk (SA)

- Rwanda won the toss and elected to field.
- David Demba (Gam) made his T20I debut.

9 December 2023
09:00
Scorecard

Ghana; 54 (16.1 overs)	v	Rwanda; 57/7 (13.4 overs)
Alex Osei 21 (17); Kevin Irakoze 2/5 (2.1 overs)		Kevin Irakoze 13* (10); Kofi Bagabena 2/8 (4 overs)

Rwanda won by 3 wickets
Willowmoore Park, Benoni
Umpires: Alpheus Gawe (SA) and Gert van Wyk (SA)

- Ghana won the toss and elected to bat.

10 December 2023
09:00
Scorecard

Ghana; 185/3 (20 overs)	v	Gambia; 87/7 (20 overs)
Alex Osei 72 (55); Ismaila Tamba 1/23 (2 overs)		Andre Jarju 15 (26); Kofi Bagabena 2/13 (4 overs); Richmond Baaleri 2/13 (4 overs)

Ghana won by 98 runs
Willowmoore Park, Benoni
Umpires: Cecil Rabie (SA) and Gert van Wyk (SA)

- Gambia won the toss and elected to field.

=== Group B ===
==== Points table ====
Pos	Team	Pld	W	L	NR	Pts	NRR	Qualification
1	Kenya	3	3	0	0	6	5.959	Qualified for the 2023 ACA Africa T20 Cup
2	Sierra Leone	3	2	1	0	4	3.156	Qualified for the 2023 ACA Africa T20 Cup
3	Cameroon	3	1	2	0	2	−4.017	
4	Mali	3	0	3	0	0	−7.090	

Source: ESPNcricinfo

==== Fixtures ====
6 December 2023
13:30
Scorecard

Cameroon; 48 (16.2 overs)	v	Kenya; 50/0 (3.1 overs)
Julien Abega 15 (31); Vishil Patel 3/6 (4 overs)		Rushab Patel 22* (9)

Kenya won by 10 wickets
Willowmoore Park, Benoni
Umpires: Kobus Conradie (SA) and Alpheus Gawe (SA)

- Kenya won the toss and elected to field.
- Neil Mugabe (Ken) made his T20I debut.

7 December 2023
09:00
Scorecard

Cameroon; 144/5 (17 overs)	v	Mali; 112/8 (17 overs)
Bruno Toube 28 (23); Theodore Macalou 3/23 (4 overs)		Mahamadou Diaby 31 (33); Bruno Toube 3/13 (4 overs)

Cameroon won by 39 runs (DLS method)
Willowmoore Park, Benoni
Umpires: Cecil Rabie (SA) and Gert van Wyk (SA)

- Mali won the toss and elected to field.
- The match was reduced to 17 overs due to rain. Mali were set a revised target of 152 runs.

7 December 2023
13:30
Scorecard

Sierra Leone; 88/6 (20 overs)	v	Kenya; 89/2 (14.3 overs)
Abbas Gbla 29* (22); Vishil Patel 2/8 (3 overs)		Rushab Patel 42* (40); Chernoh Bah 1/7 (2 overs)

Kenya won by 8 wickets
Willowmoore Park, Benoni
Umpires: Alpheus Gawe (SA) and Cecil Rabie (SA)

- Kenya won the toss and elected to field.
- Ibrahim Sesay (Sle) made his T20I debut.

8 December 2023
13:30
Scorecard

Mali; 39 (18.2 overs)	v	Kenya; 40/0 (2.3 overs)
Moustapha Diakite 14 (14); Vishil Patel 4/5 (4 overs)		Collins Obuya 32* (10)

Kenya won by 10 wickets
Willowmoore Park, Benoni
Umpires: Kobus Conradie (SA) and Cecil Rabie (SA)

- Mali won the toss and elected to bat.

9 December 2023
13:30
Scorecard

Mali; 37 (14 overs)	v	Sierra Leone; 41/2 (2.5 overs)
Mamadou Diawara 8 (14); Chernoh Bah 4/10 (3 overs)		John Bangura 17 (8); Mahamadou Diaby 1/13 (0.5 overs)

Sierra Leone won by 8 wickets
Willowmoore Park, Benoni
Umpires: Kobus Conradie (SA) and Cecil Rabie (SA)

- Mali won the toss and elected to bat.
- John Lassayo (Sle) made his T20I debut.

10 December 2023
13:30
Scorecard

Cameroon; 35 (8.3 overs)	v	Sierra Leone; 37/1 (4.2 overs)
Idriss Tchakou 10 (8); Chernoh Bah 4/2 (2 overs)		George Ngegba 17* (14); Bruno Toube 1/6 (1 over)

Sierra Leone won by 9 wickets
Willowmoore Park, Benoni
Umpires: Kobus Conradie (SA) and Alpheus Gawe (SA)

- Cameroon won the toss and elected to bat.
