= 2023 ACA Africa T20 Cup =

International cricket tournament

- Dates: 11 – 19 December 2023
- Administrator: African Cricket Association
- Cricket format: Twenty20 International
- Tournament format(s): Group stage and play-offs
- Host: South Africa
- Champions: Uganda (2nd title)
- Runners-up: Kenya
- Participants: 8
- Matches: 16
- Player of the series: (Botswana) Karabo Motlhanka
- Most runs: (Kenya) Irfan Karim (124)
- Most wickets: (Uganda) Henry Ssenyondo (16)

The 2023 ACA Africa T20 Cup was a cricket tournament that was played in Benoni, Gauteng, South Africa in December 2023. Uganda were the defending champions, having won the inaugural edition in 2022. Two qualification events were played to determine the seven teams to join Uganda in the tournament.

Despite a surprise loss to Rwanda in their opening match, Uganda retained the title after defeating Kenya by 91 runs in the final.

== Squads ==
| Botswana | Ghana | Kenya | Malawi |
|---|---|---|---|
| Karabo Motlhanka (c); Reginald Nehonde (vc); Michael Badenhorst; Vinoo Balakrishnan; Dhruv Maisuria; Monroux Kasselman; Losika Makgale; Leano Maphane; Valentine Mbazo (wk); Karabo Modise; Mmoloki Mooketsi; William Nkosana; Katlo Piet; Reynier Swart | Samson Awiah (c); Daniel Anefie; Kelvin Awala; Paul Ayoleyine; Richmoond Baaleri; Kofi Bagabena; Godfred Bakiweyem; Rexford Bakum; Obed Harvey; Alex Osei; Aziz Sualley; Joseph Theodore (wk); James Vifah; Philip Yevugah | Lucas Oluoch (c); Emmanuel Bundi; Irfan Karim (wk); Peter Langat; Neil Mugabe; Francis Mutua; Gerard Mwendwa; Shem Ngoche; Collins Obuya; Nelson Odhiambo; Rakep Patel; Rushab Patel; Vishil Patel; Tanzeel Sheikh | Moazzam Baig (c); Donnex Kansonkho (vc); Mike Choamba; Chisomo Chete (wk); Daniel Jakiel; Gift Kansonkho; Aaftab Limdawala; Beston Masauko; Gershom Ntambalika; Blessings Pondani; Sami Sohail; Kelvin Thuchila; Suhail Vayani; Phillip Zuze (wk) |
| Mozambique | Rwanda | Sierra Leone | Uganda |
| Francisco Couana (c); Manussur Algi; Filipe Cossa; Jose Huo; Jose Joao; Dario Macome; Mario Manjate; Agostinho Navicha; Farruque Nhaduate (wk); Nelson Nhaduate; Camate Raposo; Lourenco Salomone; Vieira Tembo (wk) | Clinton Rubagumya (c) (Note: Didier Ndikubwimana captained Rwanda in all of their matches.); Kevin Irakoze (vc); Martin Akayezu; Zappy Bimenyimana; Eric Dusingizimana; Hamza Khan; Eric Kubwimana; Oscar Manishimwe (wk); Muhammad Nadir; Didier Ndikubwimana (wk); Wilson Niyitanga; Eric Niyomugaba; Emile Rukiriza; Emmanuel Sebareme; Orchide Tuyisenge | George Edward Ngegba (c); Chernoh Bah; John Bangura (wk); Raymond Coker; Samuel Conteh; Abass Gbla; Yegbeh Jalloh; Ibrahim Kamara; Miniru Kpaka; Lansana Lamin; John Lassayo; George Sesay; Ibrahim Sesay; Alusine Turay | Brian Masaba (c) (Note: Kenneth Waiswa captained Uganda in their third match of the tournament.); Bilal Hassan; Cyrus Kakuru (wk); Roger Mukasa; Dinesh Nakrani; Frank Nsubuga; Robinson Obuya; Ronak Patel; Alpesh Ramjani; Riazat Ali Shah; Jonathan Ssebanja; Henry Ssenyondo; Simon Ssesazi; Kenneth Waiswa |

== Group A ==
=== Points table ===
| Pos | Team | Pld | W | L | NR | Pts | NRR | Qualification |
|---|---|---|---|---|---|---|---|---|
| 1 | Uganda | 3 | 2 | 1 | 0 | 4 | 1.676 | Advanced to the play-offs |
| 2 | Malawi | 3 | 2 | 1 | 0 | 4 | 0.201 | Advanced to the play-offs |
| 3 | Mozambique | 3 | 1 | 2 | 0 | 2 | −0.697 | |
| 4 | Rwanda | 3 | 1 | 2 | 0 | 2 | −1.079 | |

Source: ESPNcricinfo

=== Fixtures ===
11 December 2023
09:00
Scorecard

| Rwanda; 115 (20 overs) | v | Uganda; 113 (19.3 overs) |
| Zappy Bimenyimana 20 (11); Henry Ssenyondo 3/12 (4 overs) | | Roger Mukasa 36 (26); Martin Akayezu 3/34 (3.3 overs) |

Rwanda won by 2 runs
Willowmoore Park, Benoni
Umpires: Rockie D'Mello (Ken) and Machiel Moller (SA)
Player of the match: Martin Akayezu (Rwa)

- Uganda won the toss and elected to field.
- This was Rwanda's first win against Uganda in men's T20Is in their 18th attempt.

13 December 2023
09:00
Scorecard

| Malawi; 91/5 (20 overs) | v | Uganda; 92/3 (12.3 overs) |
| Donnex Kansonkho 41 (57); Bilal Hassan 2/8 (3 overs) | | Robinson Obuya 36* (27); Moazzam Baig 2/32 (4 overs) |

Uganda won by 7 wickets
Willowmoore Park, Benoni
Umpires: Rockie D'Mello (Ken) and Isaac Oyieko (Ken)
Player of the match: Bilal Hassan (Uga)

- Malawi won the toss and elected to bat.

14 December 2023
09:00
Scorecard

| Mozambique; 110/7 (20 overs) | v | Malawi; 111/4 (18.4 overs) |
| Farruque Nhaduate 39 (48); Daniel Jakiel 4/26 (4 overs) | | Sami Sohail 45* (48); Dario Macome 2/19 (4 overs) |

Malawi won by 6 wickets
Willowmoore Park, Benoni
Umpires: John Mayeku (Uga) and Machiel Moller (SA)
Player of the match: Daniel Jakiel (Mwi)

- Malawi won the toss and elected to field.
- Phillip Zuze (Mwi), Mario Manjate, Farruque Nhaduate and Nelson Nhaduate (Moz) all made their T20I debuts.

15 December 2023
13:30
Scorecard

| Uganda; 149/8 (20 overs) | v | Mozambique; 98 (17.4 overs) |
| Roger Mukasa 45 (36); Francisco Couana 3/19 (3 overs) | | Vieira Tembo 16 (11); Henry Ssenyondo 4/20 (4 overs) |

Uganda won by 51 runs
Willowmoore Park, Benoni
Umpires: Rockie D'Mello (Ken) and Machiel Moller (SA)
Player of the match: Henry Ssenyondo (Uga)

- Mozambique won the toss and elected to field.

16 December 2023
09:00
Scorecard

| Malawi; 135/7 (20 overs) | v | Rwanda; 89/9 (20 overs) |
| Sami Sohail 43 (38); Martin Akayezu 3/37 (4 overs) | | Hamza Khan 48 (42); Moazzam Baig 6/9 (4 overs) |

Malawi won by 46 runs
Willowmoore Park, Benoni
Umpires: Rockie D'Mello (Ken) and Isaac Oyieko (Ken)
Player of the match: Moazzam Baig (Mwi)

- Rwanda won the toss and elected to field.

17 December 2023
09:00
Scorecard

| Rwanda; 105/9 (20 overs) | v | Mozambique; 106/5 (16.5 overs) |
| Emmanuel Sebareme 29 (28); Camate Raposo 3/14 (3 overs) | | Francisco Couana 29 (24); Martin Akayezu 2/16 (3.5 overs) |

Mozambique won by 5 wickets
Willowmoore Park, Benoni
Umpires: Rockie D'Mello (Ken) and John Mayeku (Uga)
Player of the match: Camate Raposo (Moz)

- Rwanda won the toss and elected to bat.

== Group B ==
=== Points table ===
| Pos | Team | Pld | W | L | NR | Pts | NRR | Qualification |
|---|---|---|---|---|---|---|---|---|
| 1 | Kenya | 3 | 3 | 0 | 0 | 6 | 3.326 | Advanced to the play-offs |
| 2 | Botswana | 3 | 1 | 2 | 0 | 2 | −0.117 | Advanced to the play-offs |
| 3 | Sierra Leone | 3 | 1 | 2 | 0 | 2 | −1.328 | |
| 4 | Ghana | 3 | 1 | 2 | 0 | 2 | −1.493 | |

Source: ESPNcricinfo

=== Fixtures ===
11 December 2023
13:30
Scorecard

| Botswana; 153/6 (20 overs) | v | Ghana; 115 (18.5 overs) |
| Karabo Motlhanka 84 (66); Kofi Bagabena 3/14 (4 overs) | | Richmond Baaleri 56* (56); Karabo Motlhanka 4/16 (3 overs) |

Botswana won by 38 runs
Willowmoore Park, Benoni
Umpires: John Mayeku (Uga) and Isaac Oyieko (Ken)
Player of the match: Karabo Motlhanka (Bot)

- Ghana won the toss and elected to field.
- Michael Badenhorst, Monroux Kasselman, Reynier Swart (Bot) and Philip Yevugah (Gha) all made their T20I debuts.

12 December 2023
09:00
Scorecard

| Sierra Leone; 80 (18.1 overs) | v | Kenya; 81/2 (7.4 overs) |
| George Ngegba 16 (18); Emmanuel Bundi 3/12 (4 overs) | | Collins Obuya 43 (16); Abass Gbla 2/19 (2 overs) |

Kenya won by 8 wickets
Willowmoore Park, Benoni
Umpires: Acacio Chitsondzo (Moz) and John Mayeku (Uga)
Player of the match: Emmanuel Bundi (Ken)

- Kenya won the toss and elected to field.

13 December 2023
13:30
Scorecard

| Ghana; 107/9 (20 overs) | v | Kenya; 113/2 (13.1 overs) |
| Obed Harvey 33 (26); Peter Langat 4/8 (3 overs) | | Irfan Karim 52* (46); Godfred Bakiweyem 1/19 (2 overs) |

Kenya won by 8 wickets
Willowmoore Park, Benoni
Umpires: Acacio Chitsondzo (Moz) and Machiel Moller (SA)
Player of the match: Peter Langat (Ken)

- Ghana won the toss and elected to bat.

15 December 2023
09:00
Scorecard

| Botswana; 115/8 (20 overs) | v | Sierra Leone; 118/8 (19.4 overs) |
| Reginald Nehonde 24 (27); George Sesay 4/6 (4 overs) | | Lansana Lamin 38 (30); Reynier Swart 2/9 (2.5 overs) |

Sierra Leone won by 2 wickets
Willowmoore Park, Benoni
Umpires: Acacio Chitsondzo (Moz) and Isaac Oyieko (Ken)
Player of the match: George Sesay (Sle)

- Botswana won the toss and elected to bat.
- George Sesay became the first bowler for Sierra Leone to take a hat-trick in men's T20Is.

16 December 2023
13:30
Scorecard

| Kenya; 131/9 (20 overs) | v | Botswana; 91/9 (20 overs) |
| Irfan Karim 39 (41); Dhruv Maisuria 3/25 (4 overs) | | Vinoo Balakrishnan 25 (25); Vishil Patel 4/21 (4 overs) |

Kenya won by 40 runs
Willowmoore Park, Benoni
Umpires: Acacio Chitsondzo (Moz) and John Mayeku (Uga)
Player of the match: Vishil Patel (Ken)

- Botswana won the toss and elected to field.

17 December 2023
13:30
Scorecard

| Sierra Leone; 111/6 (20 overs) | v | Ghana; 112/8 (19.4 overs) |
| Alusine Turay 78* (72); Obed Harvey 1/12 (4 overs) | | Alex Osei 41 (42); George Sesay 2/22 (3.4 overs) |

Ghana won by 2 wickets
Willowmoore Park, Benoni
Umpires: Machiel Moller (SA) and Isaac Oyieko (Ken)
Player of the match: Alusine Turay (Sle)

- Sierra Leone won the toss and elected to bat.

== Play-offs ==
=== Bracket ===
Semi-finals
A1 | Uganda | 65/0 (5.2)
B2 | Botswana | 62 (20)
B1 | Kenya | 138/7 (20)
A2 | Malawi | 39/2 (5)

Final
Uganda | 186/8 (20)
Kenya | 95 (15.4)
3rd place play-off
Botswana | 107/7 (20)
Malawi | 103/8 (20)

=== Semi-finals ===
18 December 2023
09:00
Scorecard

| Botswana; 62 (20 overs) | v | Uganda; 65/0 (5.2 overs) |
| Karabo Motlhanka 13 (22); Bilal Hassan 3/8 (4 overs) | | Simon Ssesazi 34* (16) |

Uganda won by 10 wickets
Willowmoore Park, Benoni
Umpires: Acacio Chitsondzo (Moz) and Isaac Oyieko (Ken)
Player of the match: Bilal Hassan (Uga)

- Uganda won the toss and elected to field.

18 December 2023
13:30
Scorecard

| Kenya; 138/7 (20 overs) | v | Malawi; 39/2 (5 overs) |
| Neil Mugabe 56* (42); Donnex Kansonkho 4/16 (3 overs) | | Sami Sohail 17 (9); Nelson Odhiambo 1/6 (1 over) |

Kenya won by 4 runs (DLS method)
Willowmoore Park, Benoni
Umpires: Machiel Moller (SA) and John Mayeku (Uga)
Player of the match: Neil Mugabe (Ken)

- Kenya won the toss and elected to bat.
- Malawi were set a revised target of 44 runs in 5 overs due to rain.

=== 3rd place play-off ===
19 December 2023
09:00
Scorecard

| Malawi; 103/8 (20 overs) | v | Botswana; 107/7 (20 overs) |
| Aaftab Limdawala 31 (34); Mmoloki Mooketsi 4/16 (4 overs) | | Reginald Nehonde 49 (52); Blessings Pondani 2/12 (2 overs) |

Botswana won by 3 wickets
Willowmoore Park, Benoni
Umpires: Rockie D'Mello (Ken) and Isaac Oyieko (Ken)
Player of the match: Mmoloki Mooketsi (Bot)

- Botswana won the toss and elected to field.
- William Nkosana (Bot) made his T20I debut.

=== Final ===
19 December 2023
13:30
Scorecard

| Uganda; 186/8 (20 overs) | v | Kenya; 95 (15.4 overs) |
| Robinson Obuya 57 (38); Shem Ngoche 2/22 (4 overs) | | Irfan Karim 30 (33); Henry Ssenyondo 4/20 (4 overs) |

Uganda won by 91 runs
Willowmoore Park, Benoni
Umpires: Acacio Chitsondzo (Moz) and Machiel Moller (SA)
Player of the match: Henry Ssenyondo (Uga)

- Kenya won the toss and elected to field.
