= 2023 West Africa Trophy =

International cricket tournament

- Dates: 4 – 15 October 2023
- Administrator: Nigeria Cricket Association
- Cricket format: Twenty20 International
- Tournament format(s): Triple round-robin and play-offs
- Host: Nigeria
- Champions: Nigeria (1st title)
- Runners-up: Rwanda
- Participants: 4
- Matches: 20
- Player of the series: (Nigeria) Isaac Okpe
- Most runs: (Nigeria) Sulaimon Runsewe (229)
- Most wickets: (Nigeria) Isaac Okpe (17)

The 2023 West Africa Trophy was a Twenty20 International (T20I) cricket tournament that took place in Nigeria in October 2023. The tournament was played at the Tafawa Balewa Square Cricket Oval in Lagos, and featured national teams from Nigeria, Ghana, Rwanda and Sierra Leone. For Nigeria and Rwanda, the tournament formed part of their preparations for the Africa World Cup Qualifier.

At the final rest day, Nigeria had won each of their first eight matches to secure the top position in the round-robin stage. Nigeria defeated Rwanda in the final by 17 runs to win the first edition of the West Africa Trophy. Nigeria's Isaac Okpe was named player of the tournament.

== Squads ==
Ghana	Nigeria	Rwanda	Sierra Leone
Samson Awiah (c); Michael Aboagye; Kelvin Awala; Daniel Anefie; Kofi Bagabena; Godfred Bakiweyem; Rexford Bakum; Obed Harvey; Nurudeen Ibrahim; Syed Aqeel Israr; Alex Osei; Aziz Sualley; Joseph Theodore (wk); James Vifah	Sylvester Okpe (c) (Note: Ademola Onikoyi captained Nigeria in the seventeenth match of the series.); Ridwan Abdulkareem; Sesan Adedeji; Peter Aho; Daniel Ajekun; Joshua Asia; Isaac Danladi; Akhere Isesele; Isaac Okpe; Ademola Onikoyi; Sulaimon Runsewe (wk); Mohameed Taiwo; Chiemelie Udekwe; Prosper Useni	Didier Ndikubwimana (c, wk); Martin Akayezu; Zappy Bimenyimana; Eric Dusingizimana; Jean Iradukunda; Kevin Irakoze; Hamza Khan; Eric Kubwimana; Oscar Manishimwe (wk); Muhammad Nadir; Wilson Niyitanga; Emile Rukiriza; Emmanuel Sebareme; Orchide Tuyisenge	George Edward Ngegba (c); Chernoh Bah; John Bangura (wk); Raymond Coker (wk); Samuel Conteh; Abass Gbla; Yegbeh Jalloh; Aruna Kainessie; Ibrahim Kamara; Miniru Kpaka; Lansana Lamin; George Sesay; Alusine Turay; Moses Williams

== Points table ==
Pos	Team	Pld	W	L	NR	Pts	NRR	Qualification
1	Nigeria	9	9	0	0	18	2.520	Advanced to the final
2	Rwanda	9	4	5	0	8	0.591	Advanced to the final
3	Ghana	9	4	5	0	8	−1.260	Advanced to the 3rd place play-off
4	Sierra Leone	9	1	8	0	2	−1.668	Advanced to the 3rd place play-off

Source: ESPNcricinfo

== Fixtures ==
4 October 2023
10:00
Scorecard

Nigeria; 127/8 (20 overs)	v	Rwanda; 73 (18.1 overs)
Daniel Ajekun 28 (42); Emile Rukiriza 3/13 (3 overs)		Orchide Tuyisenge 24 (27); Chiemelie Udekwe 3/14 (4 overs)

Nigeria won by 54 runs
Tafawa Balewa Square Cricket Oval, Lagos
Umpires: Olumide Akintokun (Nga) and David Odhiambo (Ken)
Player of the match: Chiemelie Udekwe (Nga)

- Nigeria won the toss and elected to bat.
- Hamza Khan and Muhammad Nadir (Rwa) both made their T20I debuts.

4 October 2023
14:15
Scorecard

Sierra Leone; 95/9 (20 overs)	v	Ghana; 96/7 (17.2 overs)
Alusine Turay 33 (18); Obed Harvey 3/14 (4 overs)		Obed Harvey 28* (41); Samuel Conteh 2/13 (3.2 overs)

Ghana won by 3 wickets
Tafawa Balewa Square Cricket Oval, Lagos
Umpires: Wale Adeoye (Nga) and Habib Enesi (Nga)
Player of the match: Obed Harvey (Gha)

- Ghana won the toss and elected to field.
- Syed Aqeel Israr (Gha) and Moses Williams (Sle) both made their T20I debuts.

5 October 2023
10:00
Scorecard

Nigeria; 155/6 (20 overs)	v	Sierra Leone; 92 (18.5 overs)
Sulaimon Runsewe 79* (55); Raymond Coker 2/19 (4 overs)		John Bangura 36 (48); Isaac Okpe 2/7 (2 overs)

Nigeria won by 63 runs
Tafawa Balewa Square Cricket Oval, Lagos
Umpires: Musa Bodie (Nga) and Taiwo Oladunjoye (Nga)
Player of the match: Sulaimon Runsewe (Nga)

- Sierra Leone won the toss and elected to field.
- Yegbeh Jalloh and Aruna Kainessie (Sle) both made their T20I debuts.

5 October 2023
14:15
Scorecard

Rwanda; 121/7 (20 overs)	v	Ghana; 121 (20 overs)
Hamza Khan 45 (46); Samson Awiah 2/21 (4 overs)		Kelvin Awala 23 (14); Martin Akayezu 4/17 (2 overs)

Match tied
(Ghana won the Super Over)
Tafawa Balewa Square Cricket Oval, Lagos
Umpires: Ibrahim Kabia (Sle) and Kehinde Olanbiwonnu (Nga)
Player of the match: Kevin Irakoze (Rwa)

- Rwanda won the toss and elected to bat.
- Super Over: Ghana 6/1, Rwanda 3/2

6 October 2023
10:00
Scorecard

Nigeria; 129 (19.3 overs)	v	Ghana; 94 (18 overs)
Daniel Ajekun 36 (21); Michael Aboagye 3/21 (4 overs)		Obed Harvey 38 (35); Mohameed Taiwo 2/9 (2 overs)

Nigeria won by 35 runs
Tafawa Balewa Square Cricket Oval, Lagos
Umpires: Habib Enesi (Nga) and David Odhiambo (Ken)
Player of the match: Peter Aho (Nga)

- Ghana won the toss and elected to field.

6 October 2023
14:15
Scorecard

Rwanda; 154/8 (20 overs)	v	Sierra Leone; 121/5 (20 overs)
Hamza Khan 59 (44); Alusine Turay 4/29 (4 overs)		George Ngegba 38* (45); Kevin Irakoze 2/27 (4 overs)

Rwanda won by 33 runs
Tafawa Balewa Square Cricket Oval, Lagos
Umpires: Olawale Adekoya (Nga) and Olumide Akintokun (Nga)
Player of the match: Hamza Khan (Rwa)

- Rwanda won the toss and elected to bat.

7 October 2023
10:00
Scorecard

Rwanda; 95/9 (18 overs)	v	Nigeria; 101/4 (16.2 overs)
Orchide Tuyisenge 27 (45); Isaac Okpe 3/30 (4 overs)		Isaac Danladi 31* (24); Emmanuel Sebareme 1/5 (3 overs)

Nigeria won by 6 wickets
Tafawa Balewa Square Cricket Oval, Lagos
Umpires: Taiwo Oladunjoye (Nga) and Kehinde Olanbiwonnu (Nga)
Player of the match: Isaac Danladi (Nga)

- Nigeria won the toss and elected to field.
- The match was reduced to 18 overs per side due to rain.

7 October 2023
14:15
Scorecard

Sierra Leone; 110/7 (20 overs)	v	Ghana; 111/2 (16.5 overs)
Lansana Lamin 32 (27); Obed Harvey 3/18 (4 overs)		Godfred Bakiweyem 41* (40); George Sesay 1/17 (3 overs)

Ghana won by 8 wickets
Tafawa Balewa Square Cricket Oval, Lagos
Umpires: Musa Bodie (Nga) and Ibrahim Kabia (Sle)
Player of the match: Obed Harvey (Gha)

- Ghana won the toss and elected field.

8 October 2023
10:00
Scorecard

Sierra Leone; 49 (14.5 overs)	v	Nigeria; 50/1 (7.1 overs)
John Bangura 17* (28); Mohameed Taiwo 4/13 (4 overs)		Daniel Ajekun 21* (20); George Sesay 1/8 (1 over)

Nigeria won by 9 wickets
Tafawa Balewa Square Cricket Oval, Lagos
Umpires: Olawale Adekoya (Nga) and David Odhiambo (Ken)
Player of the match: Mohameed Taiwo (Nga)

- Sierra Leone won the toss and elected to bat.

8 October 2023
14:15
Scorecard

Rwanda; 107/5 (20 overs)	v	Ghana; 60 (15.3 overs)
Eric Dusingizimana 56* (65); Godfred Bakiweyem 3/16 (4 overs)		Obed Harvey 18 (20); Emmanuel Sebareme 4/6 (3.3 overs)

Rwanda won by 47 runs
Tafawa Balewa Square Cricket Oval, Lagos
Umpires: Olumide Akintokun (Nga) and Habib Enesi (Nga)
Player of the match: Emmanuel Sebareme (Rwa)

- Rwanda won the toss and elected to bat.

10 October 2023
10:00
Scorecard

Nigeria; 142/6 (20 overs)	v	Ghana; 60 (14.2 overs)
Sulaimon Runsewe 80 (62); Rexford Bakum 2/21 (3 overs)		James Vifah 16 (12); Mohameed Taiwo 4/16 (4 overs)

Nigeria won by 82 runs
Tafawa Balewa Square Cricket Oval, Lagos
Umpires: Olumide Akintokun (Nga) and Musa Bodie (Nga)
Player of the match: Sulaimon Runsewe (Nga)

- Nigeria won the toss and elected to bat.

10 October 2023
14:15
Scorecard

Sierra Leone; 109 (19.1 overs)	v	Rwanda; 107/8 (20 overs)
John Bangura 30 (39); Emmanuel Sebareme 3/12 (4 overs)		Hamza Khan 38 (30); Raymond Coker 3/12 (4 overs)

Sierra Leone won by 2 runs
Tafawa Balewa Square Cricket Oval, Lagos
Umpires: Habib Enesi (Nga) and Taiwo Oladunjoye (Nga)
Player of the match: Raymond Coker (Sle)

- Sierra Leone won the toss and elected to bat.

11 October 2023
10:00
Scorecard

Ghana; 109/9 (20 overs)	v	Nigeria; 110/5 (18.1 overs)
Obed Harvey 23 (27); Isaac Danladi 3/11 (4 overs)		Ademola Onikoyi 52* (55); Godfred Bakiweyem 2/18 (4 overs)

Nigeria won by 5 wickets
Tafawa Balewa Square Cricket Oval, Lagos
Umpires: Ibrahim Kabia (Sle) and David Odhiambo (Ken)
Player of the match: Isaac Danladi (Nga)

- Nigeria won the toss and elected to field.

11 October 2023
14:15
Scorecard

Sierra Leone; 77 (19.4 overs)	v	Rwanda; 78/5 (15.2 overs)
Chernoh Bah 15 (13); Emile Rukiriza 3/21 (3.4 overs)		Orchide Tuyisenge 21 (16); Miniru Kpaka 1/14 (3 overs)

Rwanda won by 5 wickets
Tafawa Balewa Square Cricket Oval, Lagos
Umpires: Olawale Adekoya (Nga) and Kehinde Olanbiwonnu (Nga)
Player of the match: Emile Rukiriza (Rwa)

- Sierra Leone won the toss and elected to bat.

12 October 2023
10:00
Scorecard

Ghana; 54 (14.2 overs)	v	Rwanda; 58/1 (6.2 overs)
Rexford Bakum 14 (17); Kevin Irakoze 3/5 (2 overs)		Orchide Tuyisenge 35* (23); Daniel Anefie 1/3 (1 over)

Rwanda won by 9 wickets
Tafawa Balewa Square Cricket Oval, Lagos
Umpires: Olumide Akintokun (Nga) and Taiwo Oladunjoye (Nga)
Player of the match: Kevin Irakoze (Rwa)

- Ghana won the toss and elected to bat.
- Nurudeen Ibrahim (Gha) made his T20I debut.

12 October 2023
14:15
Scorecard

Nigeria; 106 (19.2 overs)	v	Sierra Leone; 53 (15.4 overs)
Ademola Onikoyi 26 (26); Samuel Conteh 4/12 (3.2 overs)		Ibrahim Kamara 12* (15); Isaac Danladi 3/8 (4 overs)

Nigeria won by 53 runs
Tafawa Balewa Square Cricket Oval, Lagos
Umpires: Musa Bodie (Nga) and Habib Enesi (Nga)
Player of the match: Isaac Okpe (Nga)

- Sierra Leone won the toss and elected to field.

14 October 2023
10:00
Scorecard

Rwanda; 24 (6.1 overs)	v	Nigeria; 27/2 (6.1 overs)
Orchide Tuyisenge 6 (2); Muhammad Nadir 6 (2); Peter Aho 4/14 (1.3 overs)		Sulaimon Runsewe 19* (17); Muhammad Nadir 1/2 (2 overs)

Nigeria won by 8 wickets
Tafawa Balewa Square Cricket Oval, Lagos
Umpires: Olawale Adekoya (Nga) and Ibrahim Kabia (Sle)
Player of the match: Joshua Asia (Nga)

- Nigeria won the toss and elected to field.
- The match was reduced to 9 overs per side due to rain.

14 October 2023
14:15
Scorecard

Ghana; 112/9 (20 overs)	v	Sierra Leone; 107/6 (20 overs)
Rexford Bakum 30 (27); Miniru Kpaka 3/31 (4 overs)		George Ngegba 26* (25); Godfred Bakiweyem 2/27 (4 overs)

Ghana won by 5 runs
Tafawa Balewa Square Cricket Oval, Lagos
Umpires: David Odhiambo (Ken) and Taiwo Oladunjoye (Nga)
Player of the match: Rexford Bakum (Gha)

- Sierra Leone won the toss and elected to field.

== 3rd place play-off ==
15 October 2023
10:00
Scorecard

Ghana; 72 (18.1 overs)	v	Sierra Leone; 73/4 (18 overs)
Daniel Anefie 19 (19); Ibrahim Kamara 3/4 (1.1 overs)		George Ngegba 29* (35); Obed Harvey 1/6 (3 overs)

Sierra Leone won by 6 wickets
Tafawa Balewa Square Cricket Oval, Lagos
Umpires: Olumide Akintokun (Nga) and Musa Bodie (Nga)
Player of the match: George Ngegba (Sle)

- Ghana won the toss and elected to bat.

== Final ==
15 October 2023
14:15
Scorecard

Nigeria; 103/7 (20 overs)	v	Rwanda; 86/8 (20 overs)
Isaac Danladi 44 (47); Muhammad Nadir 1/10 (4 overs)		Orchide Tuyisenge 21 (27); Joshua Asia 3/9 (4 overs)

Nigeria won by 17 runs
Tafawa Balewa Square Cricket Oval, Lagos
Umpires: Habib Enesi (Nga) and Kehinde Olanbiwonnu (Nga)
Player of the match: Isaac Danladi (Nga)

- Nigeria won the toss and elected to bat.
