= 2021 Men's T20 World Cup Africa qualifier =

Cricket tournament

The 2021 ICC Men's T20 World Cup Africa Qualifier was a cricket tournament played as part of the qualification process for the 2022 ICC Men's T20 World Cup, during October and November 2021.

In April 2018, the International Cricket Council (ICC) granted full international status to Twenty20 men's matches played between member sides from 1 January 2019 onwards. Therefore, all the matches in the Regional Qualifiers had the Twenty20 Internationals (T20Is) status. The Africa Qualifier started with a sub-regional qualifier consisting of two groups, with the top team in each group progressing to the Regional Final. Kenya and Nigeria, the two highest ranked teams as of 1 January 2020, progressed directly to the Regional Final.

The sub-regional tournament was scheduled to take place in South Africa from 27 April to 3 May 2020; however, on 24 March 2020, the ICC confirmed that all ICC qualifying events scheduled to take place before 30 June 2020 had been postponed due to the COVID-19 pandemic. In December 2020, the ICC updated the qualification pathway following the pandemic-related disruption. In March 2021, the sub-regional qualifiers were postponed again, with them both being moved back to October 2021. In July 2021, the Rwanda Cricket Association announced that the ICC had confirmed Rwanda as the host nation for all of the matches in the Africa Qualifier. Qualifier A matches were played at two venues in Kigali, the Gahanga International Cricket Stadium and the IPRC Cricket Ground.

Uganda finished in first place in Qualifier A to join Kenya and Nigeria in the Regional Final. Dinesh Nakrani of Uganda was named player of the series. Qualifier B was won by Tanzania, who claimed the fourth and final place in the Regional Final. Uganda won the Regional Final, winning five of their six matches, to progress to the Global Qualifiers.

== Qualifier A ==
2021 ICC Men's T20 World Cup Africa Sub-regional Qualifier A
- Dates: 16 – 22 October 2021
- Administrator: ICC Africa
- Cricket format: T20I
- Host: Rwanda
- Champions: Uganda
- Participants: 7
- Matches: 21
- Player of the series: (Uganda) Dinesh Nakrani
- Most runs: (Rwanda) Orchide Tuyisenge (199)
- Most wickets: (Uganda) Dinesh Nakrani (21)

=== Squads ===
| Eswatini | Ghana | Lesotho | Malawi | Rwanda | Seychelles | Uganda |
|---|---|---|---|---|---|---|
| Naeem Gull (c); Muhammad Amin; Frederick Chester; Christiaan Forbes; Juber Ghadiyali; Junain Hansrod; Mancoba Jele; Siphesihle Kubheka; Melusi Magagula; Shehzad Patel (wk); Umair Qasim; Haris Rashid; Joseph Wright; Lindinkosi Zulu | Obed Harvey (c); Samson Awiah (vc); Moses Anafie; Daniel Anefie; Kelvin Awala; Richmond Baaleri; Kofi Bagabena; Godfred Bakiweyem; Rexford Bakum; Amoluk Singh; Devender Singh; Aziz Sualley; Joseph Theodore (wk); James Vifah | Samir Patel (c); Ts'episo Chaoana; Omar Hussain; Yahya Jakda; Maaz Khan; Mohleki Leoela; Mthimkhulu Leporoporo; Ts'eliso Letsitsa; Molai Matsau; Lefulere Monanthane; Ayaj Patel; Sarfaraj Patel; Gladwin Thamae; Chachole Tlali (wk) | Moazzam Baig (c); Donnex Kansonkho (vc); Mohamed Abdulla; Chisomo Chete (wk); Mike Choamba; Waliyu Jackson; Alick Kansonkho; Gift Kansonkho; Michael Mwamadi; Leneck Nakomo; Gershom Ntambalika; Blessings Pondani; Chikondi Rice; Sami Sohail | Clinton Rubagumya (c); Kevin Irakoze (vc); Martin Akayezu; Zappy Bimenyimana; Eric Dusingizimana; Yvan Mitari; Didier Ndikubwimana (wk); Eric Niyomugabo; Subhasis Samal; Emmanuel Sebareme; Orchide Tuyisenge; Bosco Tuyizere; David Uwimana (wk); Pankaj Vekaria | Kaushalkumar Patel (c); Pednekar Abhijit; Subramanian Annand; Paul Byron; Radhakrishnan Deepak; Kerai Govind; Hirani Harji; Mazharul Islam; Deso Kalvin; Naidoo Krishna; Stephen Madusanka; Shanmugasundram Mohan (wk); Vadodariya Mukesh; Rao Nil; Thiyagarajan Rajiv; Sohail Rocket; Samarathunga Rukmal; Sivakumar Udhayan | Deusdedit Muhumuza (c); Fred Achelam (wk); Richard Agamiire; Frank Akankwasa; Bilal Hassan; Saud Islam; Gerald Mubiru; Dinesh Nakrani; Frank Nsubuga; Ronak Patel; Riazat Ali Shah; Henry Ssenyondo; Simon Ssesazi; Kenneth Waiswa |

=== Points table ===
| Pos | Team | Pld | W | L | NR | Pts | NRR |
|---|---|---|---|---|---|---|---|
| 1 | Uganda | 6 | 6 | 0 | 0 | 12 | 4.669 |
| 2 | Ghana | 6 | 5 | 1 | 0 | 10 | 2.220 |
| 3 | Malawi | 6 | 4 | 2 | 0 | 8 | 0.026 |
| 4 | Rwanda | 6 | 3 | 3 | 0 | 6 | 0.516 |
| 5 | Seychelles | 6 | 2 | 4 | 0 | 4 | −2.345 |
| 6 | Eswatini | 6 | 1 | 5 | 0 | 2 | −2.064 |
| 7 | Lesotho | 6 | 0 | 6 | 0 | 0 | −3.830 |

Source: ESPN Cricinfo

advanced to the regional final

=== Fixtures ===
16 October 2021
09:15
Scorecard

| Rwanda; 153/9 (20 overs) | v | Ghana; 157/5 (20 overs) |
| Eric Niyomugabo 48 (34); Samson Awiah 5/23 (4 overs) | | Obed Harvey 54* (41); Zappy Bimenyimana 2/32 (4 overs) |

Ghana won by 5 wickets
Gahanga International Cricket Stadium, Kigali
Umpires: Patric Makumbi (Uga) and Claude Thorburn (Nam)
Player of the match: Samson Awiah (Gha)

- Ghana won the toss and elected to field.
- Emmanuel Sebareme (Rwa) and Aziz Sualley (Gha) both made their T20I debuts.
- Samson Awiah became the first bowler for Ghana to take a five-wicket haul in T20Is.

16 October 2021
09:15
Scorecard

| Eswatini; 194/4 (20 overs) | v | Lesotho; 140 (17.3 overs) |
| Muhammad Amin 80 (48); Sarfaraj Patel 2/40 (4 overs) | | Chachole Tlali 35 (23); Melusi Magagula 3/12 (4 overs) |

Eswatini won by 54 runs
IPRC Cricket Ground, Kigali
Umpires: Allahudien Paleker (SA) and Claus Schumacher (Nam)
Player of the match: Muhammad Amin (Esw)

- Eswatini won the toss and elected to bat.
- Muhammad Amin, Frederick Chester, Christiaan Forbes, Juber Ghadiyali, Naeem Gull, Junain Hansrod, Siphesihle Kubheka, Melusi Magagula, Shehzad Patel, Umair Qasim, Joseph Wright (Esw), Ts'episo Chaoana, Omar Hussain, Yahya Jakda, Maaz Khan, Mthimkhulu Leporoporo, Molai Matsau, Lefulere Monanthane, Ayaj Patel, Samir Patel, Sarfaraj Patel and Chachole Tlali (Les) all made their T20I debuts.
- Eswatini and Lesotho both played their first men's T20I match.

16 October 2021
13:45
Scorecard

| Seychelles; 95 (20 overs) | v | Ghana; 96/1 (10.1 overs) |
| Deso Kalvin 30 (26); Kofi Bagabena 5/9 (4 overs) | | Moses Anafie 41* (20) |

Ghana won by 9 wickets
Gahanga International Cricket Stadium, Kigali
Umpires: Itangishaka Olivier (Rwa) and Isaac Oyieko (Ken)
Player of the match: Kofi Bagabena (Gha)

- Seychelles won the toss and elected to bat.
- Mazharul Islam, Deso Kalvin, Naidoo Krishna, Stephen Madusanka, Shanmugasundram Mohan, Vadodariya Mukesh, Rao Nil, Kaushalkumar Patel, Thiyagarajan Rajiv, Sohail Rocket and Sivakumar Udhayan (Sey) all made their T20I debuts.
- Seychelles played their first men's T20I match.
- Kofi Bagabena took his first five-wicket haul in T20Is, and became the first bowler for Ghana to take a hat-trick in T20Is.

16 October 2021
13:45
Scorecard

| Malawi; 98/7 (20 overs) | v | Uganda; 101/0 (11 overs) |
| Gift Kansonkho 33 (48); Frank Akankwasa 2/10 (2 overs) | | Simon Ssesazi 62* (39) |

Uganda won by 10 wickets
IPRC Cricket Ground, Kigali
Umpires: David Odhiambo (Ken) and Christopher Phiri (Zim)
Player of the match: Simon Ssesazi (Uga)

- Malawi won the toss and elected to bat.
- Mike Choamba, Alick Kansonkho and Leneck Nakomo (Mwi) all made their T20I debuts.

17 October 2021
09:15
Scorecard

| Lesotho; 131/8 (20 overs) | v | Seychelles; 132/4 (16.2 overs) |
| Samir Patel 35* (26); Kaushalkumar Patel 2/16 (4 overs) | | Thiyagarajan Rajiv 36 (27); Yahya Jakda 2/32 (4 overs) |

Seychelles won by 6 wickets
Gahanga International Cricket Stadium, Kigali
Umpires: Patric Makumbi (Uga) and Claus Schumacher (Nam)
Player of the match: Naidoo Krishna (Sey)

- Seychelles won the toss and elected to field.
- Gladwin Thamae (Les) made his T20I debut.

17 October 2021
09:15
Scorecard

| Eswatini; 97 (18.2 overs) | v | Malawi; 99/2 (12.4 overs) |
| Juber Ghadiyali 22 (22); Moazzam Baig 5/13 (4 overs) | | Sami Sohail 32* (24); Juber Ghadiyali 1/8 (1.4 overs) |

Malawi won by 8 wickets
IPRC Cricket Ground, Kigali
Umpires: Allahudien Paleker (SA) and Claude Thorburn (Nam)
Player of the match: Moazzam Baig (Mwi)

- Malawi won the toss and elected to field.
- Blessings Pondani (Mwi) made his T20I debut.
- Moazzam Baig became the first bowler for Malawi to take a five-wicket haul in T20Is.

17 October 2021
13:45
Scorecard

| Ghana; 239/5 (20 overs) | v | Lesotho; 123 (18.2 overs) |
| Rexford Bakum 66 (31); Omar Hussain 2/28 (3 overs) | | Maaz Khan 63 (34); Rexford Bakum 5/26 (4 overs) |

Ghana won by 116 runs
Gahanga International Cricket Stadium, Kigali
Umpires: David Odhiambo (Ken) and Itangishaka Olivier (Rwa)
Player of the match: Rexford Bakum (Gha)

- Ghana won the toss and elected to bat.
- Richmond Baaleri (Gha) and Ts'eliso Letsitsa (Les) both made their T20I debuts.
- Rexford Bakum (Gha) took his first five-wicket haul in T20Is.

17 October 2021
13:45
Scorecard

| Uganda; 169/4 (20 overs) | v | Rwanda; 63 (15.1 overs) |
| Ronak Patel 63* (37); Clinton Rubagumya 1/26 (2 overs) | | Subhasis Samal 17 (26); Dinesh Nakrani 3/9 (3 overs) |

Uganda won by 106 runs
IPRC Cricket Ground, Kigali
Umpires: Isaac Oyieko (Ken) and Christopher Phiri (Zim)
Player of the match: Ronak Patel (Uga)

- Uganda won the toss and elected to bat.

19 October 2021
09:15
Scorecard

| Malawi; 95/8 (20 overs) | v | Ghana; 96/3 (12 overs) |
| Gershom Ntambalika 41 (33); Daniel Anefie 3/10 (4 overs) | | Rexford Bakum 27 (14); Moazzam Baig 2/21 (3 overs) |

Ghana won by 7 wickets
Gahanga International Cricket Stadium, Kigali
Umpires: Patric Makumbi (Uga) and David Odhiambo (Ken)
Player of the match: Daniel Anefie (Gha)

- Ghana won the toss and elected to field.

19 October 2021
09:15
Scorecard

| Lesotho; 26 (12.4 overs) | v | Uganda; 27/0 (3.4 overs) |
| Samir Patel 10 (24); Dinesh Nakrani 6/7 (4 overs) | | Saud Islam 19* (17) |

Uganda won by 10 wickets
IPRC Cricket Ground, Kigali
Umpires: Allahudien Paleker (SA) and Christopher Phiri (Zim)
Player of the match: Dinesh Nakrani (Uga)

- Lesotho won the toss and elected to bat.
- Richard Agamiire (Uga) made his T20I debut.
- Dinesh Nakrani (Uga) took his first five-wicket haul in T20Is, and equaled the record for the best bowling figures in a T20I.

19 October 2021
13:45
Scorecard

| Rwanda; 196/4 (20 overs) | v | Seychelles; 23/5 (9 overs) |
| Orchide Tuyisenge 100* (60); Vadodariya Mukesh 2/44 (4 overs) | | Stephen Madusanka 12 (25); Kevin Irakoze 3/5 (4 overs) |

Rwanda won by 78 runs (DLS method)
Gahanga International Cricket Stadium, Kigali
Umpires: Isaac Oyieko (Ken) and Claus Schumacher (Nam)
Player of the match: Orchide Tuyisenge (Rwa)

- Rwanda won the toss and elected to bat.
- No further play was possible due to rain.
- Orchide Tuyisenge became the first player for Rwanda to score a century in T20Is.

19 October 2021
13:45
Scorecard

| Eswatini; 72 (14.5 overs) | v | Uganda; 76/4 (12.1 overs) |
| Shehzad Patel 25* (21); Frank Nsubuga 3/9 (4 overs) | | Dinesh Nakrani 22* (24); Melusi Magagula 3/25 (4 overs) |

Uganda won by 6 wickets
IPRC Cricket Ground, Kigali
Umpires: Itangishaka Olivier (Rwa) and Allahudien Paleker (SA)
Player of the match: Frank Nsubuga (Uga)

- Eswatini won the toss and elected to bat.
- Mancoba Jele (Esw) made his T20I debut.

20 October 2021
09:15
Scorecard

| Malawi; 142/2 (20 overs) | v | Seychelles; 121 (19.3 overs) |
| Sami Sohail 84* (66); Sohail Rocket 1/36 (4 overs) | | Stephen Madusanka 27 (20); Sami Sohail 2/12 (2 overs) |

Malawi won by 21 runs
Gahanga International Cricket Stadium, Kigali
Umpires: Itangishaka Olivier (Rwa) and Christopher Phiri (Zim)
Player of the match: Sami Sohail (Mwi)

- Malawi won the toss and elected to bat.
- Chikondi Rice (Mwi) made his T20I debut.

20 October 2021
09:15
Scorecard

| Eswatini; 74/9 (20 overs) | v | Ghana; 75/3 (10.4 overs) |
| Juber Ghadiyali 13 (23); Obed Harvey 3/12 (4 overs) | | Devender Singh 19* (15); Umair Qasim 2/27 (4 overs) |

Ghana won by 7 wickets
IPRC Cricket Ground, Kigali
Umpires: Patric Makumbi (Uga) and Allahudien Paleker (SA)
Player of the match: Obed Harvey (Gha)

- Ghana won the toss and elected to field.
- Lindinkosi Zulu (Esw) made his T20I debut.

20 October 2021
13:45
Scorecard

| Eswatini; 128/7 (16 overs) | v | Seychelles; 130/3 (15.2 overs) |
| Muhammad Amin 51 (31); Hirani Harji 3/21 (4 overs) | | Stephen Madusanka 43* (35); Juber Ghadiyali 3/24 (4 overs) |

Seychelles won by 7 wickets
Gahanga International Cricket Stadium, Kigali
Umpires: Claus Schumacher (Nam) and Claude Thorburn (Nam)
Player of the match: Stephen Madusanka (Sey)

- Eswatini won the toss and elected to bat.
- The match was reduced to 16 overs per side due to rain.
- Kerai Govind and Hirani Harji (Sey) both made their T20I debuts.

21 October 2021
09:15
Scorecard

| Rwanda; 102/8 (11 overs) | v | Lesotho; 80/7 (11 overs) |
| Subhasis Samal 31 (17); Molai Matsau 2/18 (2 overs) | | Chachole Tlali 23 (17); Emmanuel Sebareme 3/17 (3 overs) |

Rwanda won by 22 runs
IPRC Cricket Ground, Kigali
Umpires: Isaac Oyieko (Ken) and Allahudien Paleker (SA)
Player of the match: Emmanuel Sebareme (Rwa)

- Rwanda won the toss and elected to bat.
- The match was rescheduled from 20 October and reduced to 11 overs per side due to rain.
- Mohleki Leoela (Les) made his T20I debut.

21 October 2021
09:15
Scorecard

| Uganda; 176/6 (20 overs) | v | Ghana; 97 (19.1 overs) |
| Saud Islam 67 (54); Rexford Bakum 4/29 (4 overs) | | Samson Awiah 37 (48); Dinesh Nakrani 3/17 (4 overs) |

Uganda won by 79 runs
Gahanga International Cricket Stadium, Kigali
Umpires: David Odhiambo (Ken) and Claude Thorburn (Nam)
Player of the match: Dinesh Nakrani (Uga)

- Ghana won the toss and elected to field.

22 October 2021
09:15
Scorecard

| Eswatini; 77 (16.3 overs) | v | Rwanda; 79/3 (8 overs) |
| Christiaan Forbes 31 (32); Martin Akayezu 4/9 (4 overs) | | Orchide Tuyisenge 37 (21); Mancoba Jele 2/27 (3 overs) |

Rwanda won by 7 wickets
Gahanga International Cricket Stadium, Kigali
Umpires: Isaac Oyieko (Ken) and Claude Thorburn (Nam)
Player of the match: Martin Akayezu (Rwa)

- Eswatini won the toss and elected to bat.

22 October 2021
09:15
Scorecard

| Malawi; 123/4 (15 overs) | v | Lesotho; 101/7 (15 overs) |
| Sami Sohail 26 (23); Ts'episo Chaoana 2/13 (3 overs) | | Chachole Tlali 35 (32); Moazzam Baig 3/9 (3 overs) |

Malawi won by 22 runs
IPRC Cricket Ground, Kigali
Umpires: David Odhiambo (Ken) and Allahudien Paleker (SA)
Player of the match: Moazzam Baig (Mwi)

- Lesotho won the toss and elected to field.
- The match was reduced to 15 overs per side due to rain.
- Waliyu Jackson (Mwi) made his T20I debut.

22 October 2021
13:45
Scorecard

| Malawi; 139/2 (20 overs) | v | Rwanda; 115 (18.2 overs) |
| Donnex Kansonkho 54 (65); Clinton Rubagumya 1/20 (4 overs) | | Pankaj Vekaria 20 (11); Sami Sohail 2/15 (4 overs); Moazzam Baig 2/15 (4 overs) |

Malawi won by 24 runs
Gahanga International Cricket Stadium, Kigali
Umpires: Patric Makumbi (Uga) and Christopher Phiri (Zim)
Player of the match: Sami Sohail (Mwi)

- Malawi won the toss and elected to bat.

22 October 2021
13:45
Scorecard

| Uganda; 164/5 (20 overs) | v | Seychelles; 69/9 (20 overs) |
| Ronak Patel 41 (38); Stephen Madusanka 1/20 (2 overs) | | Stephen Madusanka 20 (29); Dinesh Nakrani 5/8 (4 overs) |

Uganda won by 95 runs
IPRC Cricket Ground, Kigali
Umpires: Itangishaka Olivier (Rwa) and Claus Schumacher (Nam)
Player of the match: Dinesh Nakrani (Uga)

- Uganda won the toss and elected to bat.
- Paul Byron (Sey) made his T20I debut.
- Dinesh Nakrani took his second five-wicket haul in T20Is, and became the first bowler for Uganda to take a hat-trick in T20Is.

== Qualifier B ==
2021 ICC Men's T20 World Cup Africa Sub-regional Qualifier B
- Dates: 2 – 7 November 2021
- Administrator: ICC Africa
- Cricket format: T20I
- Host: Rwanda
- Champions: Tanzania
- Participants: 5
- Matches: 10
- Most runs: (Tanzania) Ivan Selemani (207)
- Most wickets: (Botswana) Dhruv Maisuria (11)

=== Squads ===
| Botswana | Cameroon | Mozambique | Sierra Leone | Tanzania |
|---|---|---|---|---|
| Karabo Motlhanka (c, wk); Vinoo Balakrishnan; Boemo Khumalo; Dhruv Maisuria; Rod Mbaiwa; Valentine Mbazo (wk); Mmoloki Mooketsi; James Moses; Reginald Nehonde; Tharindu Perera; Katlo Piet; Adithiya Rangaswamy; Phemelo Silas; Thatayaone Tshose | Faustin Mpegna (c); Maxwell Fru (vc); Protais Abanda; Julien Abega; Roland Amah; Abdoulaye Aminou (wk); Sun Assengong; Alexis Balla; Dipita Loic; Andre Malouck; Appolinaire Mengoumou; Narcisse Ndouteng; Charles Ondoa (wk); Idriss Tchakou; Alain Toube (wk); Bruno Toube | Filipe Cossa (c); Jose Bulele; Luis Canda; Frederico Carava; Francisco Couana; Santana Dima; Last Emilio (wk); Gomes Gomes; Joao Hou; Zefanias Matsinhe; Agostinho Navicha; Titos Nhambhau; Shelton Nhavotso; Lourenço Simango; Lourenco Solomone; Gerito Sopinho; Vieira Tembo | Lansana Lamin (c); Abu Kamara (vc); Chernoh Bah; John Bangura (wk); Samuel Conteh; Edmond Ernest; Abass Gbla; Arvind Kerai; Mohammad Shamshad Khan; Zahid Khan; Miniru Kpaka; Ibrahim Mansaray (wk); Osman Sankoh; George Sesay; Sulaiman Tarawally; Solomon Williams | Abhik Patwa (c); Riziki Kiseto (vc); Harsheed Chohan; Jatinkumar Darji; Zamoyoni Jabeneke; Arshan Jasani; Salum Jumbe; Issa Kikasi; Ally Kimote; Omary Kitunda (wk); Nasibu Mapunda (wk); Kassim Nassoro; Ivan Selemani; Jitin Singh; SanjayKumar Thakor |

=== Points table ===
| Pos | Team | Pld | W | L | NR | Pts | NRR |
|---|---|---|---|---|---|---|---|
| 1 | Tanzania | 4 | 4 | 0 | 0 | 8 | 4.592 |
| 2 | Botswana | 4 | 3 | 1 | 0 | 6 | 3.021 |
| 3 | Sierra Leone | 4 | 2 | 2 | 0 | 4 | −0.958 |
| 4 | Mozambique | 4 | 1 | 3 | 0 | 2 | 0.159 |
| 5 | Cameroon | 4 | 0 | 4 | 0 | 0 | −7.404 |

Source: ESPN Cricinfo

advanced to the regional final

=== Fixtures ===
2 November 2021
09:15
Scorecard

| Botswana; 157/5 (20 overs) | v | Sierra Leone; 85 (17.5 overs) |
| Karabo Motlhanka 74 (58); George Sesay 3/21 (3 overs) | | Abass Gbla 15 (12); Lansana Lamin 15 (12); Dhruv Maisuria 3/12 (4 overs) |

Botswana won by 72 runs
Gahanga International Cricket Stadium, Kigali
Umpires: Christopher Phiri (Zim) and Claude Thorburn (Nam)
Player of the match: Karabo Motlhanka (Bot)

- Botswana won the toss and elected to bat.
- Zahid Khan (Sle) made his T20I debut.

2 November 2021
13:45
Scorecard

| Tanzania; 242/6 (20 overs) | v | Mozambique; 155/9 (20 overs) |
| Ivan Selemani 81 (42); Santana Dima 3/42 (4 overs) | | Filipe Cossa 59 (32); Salum Jumbe 3/24 (3 overs) |

Tanzania won by 87 runs
Gahanga International Cricket Stadium, Kigali
Umpires: Simon Kintu (Uga) and Claus Schumacher (Nam)
Player of the match: Ivan Selemani (Tan)

- Tanzania won the toss and elected to bat.
- Shelton Nhavotso, Gerito Sopinho (Moz), Harsheed Chohan, Jatinkumar Darji, Salum Jumbe, Ally Kimote, Riziki Kiseto, Nasibu Mapunda, Kassim Nassoro, Abhik Patwa, Ivan Selemani, Jitin Singh and SanjayKumar Thakor (Tan) all made their T20I debuts.

3 November 2021
09:15
Scorecard

| Mozambique; 209/5 (20 overs) | v | Cameroon; 38 (10.1 overs) |
| Francisco Couana 104 (51); Dipita Loic 2/30 (4 overs) | | Protais Abanda 9 (15); Francisco Couana 5/19 (4 overs) |

Mozambique won by 171 runs
Gahanga International Cricket Stadium, Kigali
Umpires: Iknow Chabi (Zim) and Claus Schumacher (Nam)
Player of the match: Francisco Couana (Moz)

- Cameroon won the toss and elected to field.
- Protais Abanda, Julien Abega, Roland Amah, Maxwell Fru, Dipita Loic, Appolinaire Mengoumou, Faustin Mpegna, Charles Ondoa, Idriss Tchakou, Alain Toube, Bruno Toube (Cmr) and Frederico Carava (Moz) all made their T20I debuts.
- Francisco Couana became the first player for Mozambique to score a century in T20Is and to take a five-wicket haul in T20Is. This was the first time that a player scored a century and took five wickets in a single T20I.

3 November 2021
13:45
Scorecard

| Sierra Leone; 99/8 (20 overs) | v | Tanzania; 104/2 (10.5 overs) |
| Solomon Williams 22* (17); Ally Kimote 3/25 (4 overs) | | Ivan Selemani 70* (35); Edmond Ernest 1/20 (4 overs) |

Tanzania won by 8 wickets
Gahanga International Cricket Stadium, Kigali
Umpires: Simon Kintu (Uga) and Forster Mutizwa (Zim)
Player of the match: Ivan Selemani (Tan)

- Sierra Leone won the toss and elected to bat.

5 November 2021
09:15
Scorecard

| Cameroon; 51 (16 overs) | v | Botswana; 54/1 (4.5 overs) |
| Bruno Toube 19 (14); Reginald Nehonde 4/7 (3 overs) | | Valentine Mbazo 31* (11); Maxwell Fru 1/22 (2 overs) |

Botswana won by 9 wickets
Gahanga International Cricket Stadium, Kigali
Umpires: Iknow Chabi (Zim) and Claude Thorburn (Nam)
Player of the match: Reginald Nehonde (Bot)

- Cameroon won the toss and elected to bat.
- Alexis Balla (Cmr) made his T20I debut.

5 November 2021
13:45
Scorecard

| Mozambique; 96/9 (20 overs) | v | Sierra Leone; 97/5 (17.2 overs) |
| Francisco Couana 25 (18); George Sesay 4/11 (4 overs) | | Lansana Lamin 30* (26); Jose Bulele 2/19 (4 overs) |

Sierra Leone won by 5 wickets
Gahanga International Cricket Stadium, Kigali
Umpires: Forster Mutizwa (Zim) and Christopher Phiri (Zim)
Player of the match: Samuel Conteh (Sle)

- Mozambique won the toss and elected to bat.
- Agostinho Navicha (Moz) made his T20I debut.

6 November 2021
09:15
Scorecard

| Botswana; 152/5 (20 overs) | v | Mozambique; 100 (19.5 overs) |
| Reginald Nehonde 63 (51); Filipe Cossa 2/12 (2 overs) | | Francisco Couana 18 (21); Joao Hou 18 (21); Reginald Nehonde 4/27 (4 overs) |

Botswana won by 52 runs
Gahanga International Cricket Stadium, Kigali
Umpires: Forster Mutizwa (Zim) and Claus Schumacher (Nam)
Player of the match: Reginald Nehonde (Bot)

- Botswana won the toss and elected to bat.

6 November 2021
13:45
Scorecard

| Tanzania; 240/5 (20 overs) | v | Cameroon; 62 (16.2 overs) |
| Kassim Nassoro 59* (19); Maxwell Fru 3/42 (4 overs) | | Bruno Toube 21 (21); Jatinkumar Darji 4/7 (4 overs) |

Tanzania won by 178 runs
Gahanga International Cricket Stadium, Kigali
Umpires: Iknow Chabi (Zim) and Simon Kintu (Uga)
Player of the match: Kassim Nassoro (Tan)

- Tanzania won the toss and elected to bat.
- Zamoyoni Jabeneke, Arshan Jasani and Omary Kitunda (Tan) all made their T20I debuts.

7 November 2021
09:15
Scorecard

| Cameroon; 89/9 (20 overs) | v | Sierra Leone; 90/4 (12.1 overs) |
| Roland Amah 18 (26); Samuel Conteh 3/22 (4 overs) | | Zahid Khan 27 (18); Bruno Toube 3/16 (3 overs) |

Sierra Leone won by 6 wickets
Gahanga International Cricket Stadium, Kigali
Umpires: Simon Kintu (Uga) and Christopher Phiri (Zim)
Player of the match: Samuel Conteh (Sle)

- Cameroon won the toss and elected to bat.
- Narcisse Ndouteng (Cmr) made his T20I debut.

7 November 2021
13:45
Scorecard

| Tanzania; 143 (19.5 overs) | v | Botswana; 140/7 (20 overs) |
| Harsheed Chohan 25 (10); Dhruv Maisuria 4/13 (3.5 overs) | | Reginald Nehonde 37 (42); Jitin Singh 3/35 (3 overs) |

Tanzania won by 3 runs
Gahanga International Cricket Stadium, Kigali
Umpires: Forster Mutizwa (Zim) and Claude Thorburn (Nam)
Player of the match: Jitin Singh (Tan)

- Tanzania won the toss and elected to bat.

== Regional Final ==
2021 ICC Men's T20 World Cup Africa Qualifier Regional Final
- Dates: 17 – 20 November 2021
- Administrator: ICC Africa
- Cricket format: T20I
- Host: Rwanda
- Champions: Uganda
- Participants: 4
- Matches: 12
- Most runs: (Kenya) Alex Obanda (231)
- Most wickets: (Tanzania) SanjayKumar Thakor (10)

=== Squads ===
| Kenya | Nigeria | Tanzania | Uganda |
|---|---|---|---|
| Shem Ngoche (c); Emmanuel Bundi; Irfan Karim (wk); Peter Langat; Alex Obanda; Collins Obuya; Eugene Ochieng; Nehemiah Odhiambo; Elijah Otieno; Rakep Patel; Rushab Patel; Vraj Patel; Gurdeep Singh; Sukhdeep Singh | Sylvester Okpe (c); Ridwan Abdulkareem; Rasheed Abolarin; Sesan Adedeji; Peter Aho; Chima Akachukwu; Joshua Ayannaike; Daniel Gim; Samuel Mba; Isaac Okpe; Segun Olayinka; Ademola Onikoyi; Ashmit Shreshta (wk); Mohameed Taiwo; Prosper Useni | Abhik Patwa (c); Riziki Kiseto (vc); Harsheed Chohan; Jatinkumar Darji; Zamoyoni Jabeneke; Arshan Jasani; Salum Jumbe; Ally Kimote; Omary Kitunda (wk); Nasibu Mapunda (wk); Kassim Nassoro; Ivan Selemani; Jitin Singh; SanjayKumar Thakor | Brian Masaba (c); Deusdedit Muhumuza (vc); Fred Achelam (wk); Richard Agamiire; Frank Akankwasa; Bilal Hassan; Saud Islam; Dinesh Nakrani; Frank Nsubuga; Ronak Patel; Riazat Ali Shah; Henry Ssenyondo; Simon Ssesazi; Kenneth Waiswa |

=== Points table ===
| Pos | Team | Pld | W | L | NR | Pts | NRR |
|---|---|---|---|---|---|---|---|
| 1 | Uganda | 6 | 5 | 1 | 0 | 10 | 1.024 |
| 2 | Kenya | 6 | 4 | 2 | 0 | 8 | 1.002 |
| 3 | Tanzania | 6 | 3 | 3 | 0 | 6 | 0.523 |
| 4 | Nigeria | 6 | 0 | 6 | 0 | 0 | −2.610 |

Source: ESPN Cricinfo

advanced to the global qualifier

=== Fixtures ===
17 November 2021
09:15
Scorecard

| Nigeria; 114/9 (20 overs) | v | Tanzania; 117/4 (13.1 overs) |
| Ashmit Shreshta 26 (30); SanjayKumar Thakor 3/14 (4 overs) | | Abhik Patwa 36 (24); Prosper Useni 1/15 (2.1 overs) |

Tanzania won by 6 wickets
Gahanga International Cricket Stadium, Kigali
Umpires: Rockie D'Mello (Ken) and Isaac Oyieko (Ken)
Player of the match: SanjayKumar Thakor (Tan)

- Nigeria won the toss and elected to bat.

17 November 2021
09:15
Scorecard

| Kenya; 161/5 (20 overs) | v | Uganda; 160/7 (20 overs) |
| Collins Obuya 44 (35); Frank Nsubuga 2/7 (4 overs) | | Dinesh Nakrani 67 (32); Elijah Otieno 3/18 (4 overs) |

Kenya won by 1 run
IPRC Cricket Ground, Kigali
Umpires: Habib Enesi (Nga) and Shaun George (SA)
Player of the match: Dinesh Nakrani (Uga)

- Kenya won the toss and elected to bat.
- Sukhdeep Singh (Ken) made his T20I debut.

17 November 2021
13:45
Scorecard

| Uganda; 147/9 (20 overs) | v | Nigeria; 50/2 (9.2 overs) |
| Riazat Ali Shah 39 (25); Peter Aho 2/20 (4 overs) | | Ademola Onikoyi 28* (28); Frank Nsubuga 1/27 (4 overs) |

Uganda won by 12 runs (DLS method)
Gahanga International Cricket Stadium, Kigali
Umpires: Andrew Louw (Nam) and Isaac Oyieko (Ken)
Player of the match: Dinesh Nakrani (Uga)

- Uganda won the toss and elected to bat.
- No further play was possible due to rain.

17 November 2021
13:45
Scorecard

| Tanzania; 187/5 (20 overs) | v | Kenya; 138 (18.4 overs) |
| Arshan Jasani 90* (52); Rakep Patel 2/28 (4 overs) | | Alex Obanda 47 (33); Riziki Kiseto 4/17 (4 overs) |

Tanzania won by 49 runs
IPRC Cricket Ground, Kigali
Umpires: Habib Enesi (Nga) and Patric Makumbi (Uga)
Player of the match: Arshan Jasani (Tan)

- Tanzania won the toss and elected to bat.

18 November 2021
09:15
Scorecard

| Tanzania; 140/8 (20 overs) | v | Uganda; 141/2 (18.2 overs) |
| Kassim Nassoro 34 (29); Bilal Hassan 3/22 (4 overs) | | Ronak Patel 68* (49); Riziki Kiseto 2/28 (4 overs) |

Uganda won by 8 wickets
Gahanga International Cricket Stadium, Kigali
Umpires: Rockie D'Mello (Ken) and Patric Makumbi (Uga)
Player of the match: Ronak Patel (Uga)

- Tanzania won the toss and elected to bat.

18 November 2021
09:15
Scorecard

| Nigeria; 130/6 (20 overs) | v | Kenya; 136/2 (13.4 overs) |
| Sesan Adedeji 46 (50); Nehemiah Odhiambo 2/18 (4 overs) | | Alex Obanda 103* (56); Peter Aho 2/29 (3 overs) |

Kenya won by 8 wickets
IPRC Cricket Ground, Kigali
Umpires: Shaun George (SA) and Andrew Louw (Nam)
Player of the match: Alex Obanda (Ken)

- Nigeria won the toss and elected to bat.
- Alex Obanda became the first player for Kenya to score a century in T20Is.

18 November 2021
13:45
Scorecard

| Tanzania; 101 (17 overs) | v | Kenya; 104/3 (12.3 overs) |
| Kassim Nassoro 42 (31); Vraj Patel 3/17 (4 overs) | | Collins Obuya 28 (14); SanjayKumar Thakor 1/12 (2 overs) |

Kenya won by 7 wickets
Gahanga International Cricket Stadium, Kigali
Umpires: Habib Enesi (Nga) and Patric Makumbi (Uga)
Player of the match: Rushab Patel (Ken)

- Tanzania won the toss and elected to bat.

18 November 2021
13:45
Scorecard

| Nigeria; 112/9 (20 overs) | v | Uganda; 114/2 (16.2 overs) |
| Ashmit Shreshta 28 (35); Riazat Ali Shah 4/12 (3 overs) | | Ronak Patel 35* (35); Sesan Adedeji 1/12 (3 overs) |

Uganda won by 8 wickets
IPRC Cricket Ground, Kigali
Umpires: Andrew Louw (Nam) and Isaac Oyieko (Ken)
Player of the match: Riazat Ali Shah (Uga)

- Uganda won the toss and elected to field.

20 November 2021
09:15
Scorecard

| Tanzania; 68 (15.4 overs) | v | Uganda; 74/4 (13.5 overs) |
| Ivan Selemani 20 (23); Frank Akankwasa 4/10 (3.4 overs) | | Simon Ssesazi 39 (39); SanjayKumar Thakor 3/17 (4 overs) |

Uganda won by 6 wickets
Gahanga International Cricket Stadium, Kigali
Umpires: Rockie D'Mello (Ken) and Habib Enesi (Nga)
Player of the match: Frank Akankwasa (Uga)

- Uganda won the toss and elected to field.

20 November 2021
09:15
Scorecard

| Kenya; 168/6 (20 overs) | v | Nigeria; 108 (16.2 overs) |
| Irfan Karim 52* (38); Ridwan Abdulkareem 2/18 (3 overs) | | Ademola Onikoyi 27 (12); Vraj Patel 5/12 (4 overs) |

Kenya won by 60 runs
IPRC Cricket Ground, Kigali
Umpires: Shaun George (SA) and Patric Makumbi (Uga)
Player of the match: Vraj Patel (Ken)

- Nigeria won the toss and elected to field.
- Vraj Patel (Ken) took his first five-wicket haul in T20Is.

20 November 2021
13:45
Scorecard

| Kenya; 123/3 (20 overs) | v | Uganda; 118/4 (17.4 overs) |
| Rakep Patel 62* (46); Frank Nsubuga 1/9 (4 overs) | | Riazat Ali Shah 43* (31); Rakep Patel 2/17 (3 overs) |

Uganda won by 6 wickets (DLS method)
Gahanga International Cricket Stadium, Kigali
Umpires: Andrew Louw (Nam) and Isaac Oyieko (Ken)
Player of the match: Riazat Ali Shah (Uga)

- Kenya won the toss and elected to bat.
- Uganda were set a revised target of 118 runs from 19 overs due to rain.

20 November 2021
13:45
Scorecard

| Tanzania; 136/7 (20 overs) | v | Nigeria; 67 (14 overs) |
| Kassim Nassoro 40* (25); Sesan Adedeji 2/20 (4 overs) | | Samuel Mba 23 (22); Jatinkumar Darji 4/10 (4 overs) |

Tanzania won by 69 runs
IPRC Cricket Ground, Kigali
Umpires: Rockie D'Mello (Ken) and Shaun George (SA)
Player of the match: Jatinkumar Darji (Tan)

- Tanzania won the toss and elected to bat.
