= 2025 Cricket World Cup Challenge League B (Hong Kong) =

Cricket tournament

2025 Hong Kong Cricket World Cup Challenge League B
- Dates: 6 – 16 February 2025
- Administrator: International Cricket Council
- Cricket format: List A
- Tournament format: Round-robin
- Host: Hong Kong
- Participants: 6
- Matches: 15
- Most runs: (Uganda) Raghav Dhawan (273)
- Most wickets: (Uganda) Juma Miyagi (12)

The 2025 Hong Kong Cricket World Cup Challenge League B was the second round of Group B matches of the 2024–2026 Cricket World Cup Challenge League, a cricket tournament which forms part of the qualification pathway to the 2027 Cricket World Cup. The tournament was hosted by Cricket Hong Kong, China in February 2025, with all matches having List A status.

== Warm-up matches ==
=== Tri-series ===
2025 Hong Kong Tri-Nation Series
- Date: 28 January–3 February 2025
- Location: Hong Kong
- Result: Hong Kong won the series
Teams
Bahrain	Hong Kong	Uganda
Captains
Ahmer Bin Nasir	Yasim Murtaza	Riazat Ali Shah
Most runs
Rishabh Ramesh (46)	Anshuman Rath (148)	Riazat Ali Shah (99)
Most wickets
Asif Ali (5)	Nasrulla Rana (9)	Cosmas Kyewuta (9)

Bahrain, Hong Kong and Uganda played a tri-nation series in preparation for the Challenge League matches. Hong Kong defeated Uganda in the final.

==== Round-robin ====
===== Points table =====
Pos	Team	Pld	W	L	T	NR	Pts	NRR	Qualification
1	Uganda	2	2	0	0	0	4	1.540	Advanced to the final
2	Hong Kong	2	1	1	0	0	2	0.827	Advanced to the final
3	Bahrain	2	0	2	0	0	0	−2.445	Advanced to the 3rd place play-off

Source: ESPNcricinfo

===== Fixtures =====
28 January 2025
09:00
Scorecard

Hong Kong; 240/9 (50 overs)	v	Uganda; 244/7 (50 overs)
Nizakat Khan 84 (79); Cosmas Kyewuta 4/56 (10 overs)		Riazat Ali Shah 84* (93); Ehsan Khan 2/32 (8 overs)

Uganda won by 3 wickets
Mission Road Ground, Mong Kok
Umpires: Niaz Ali (HK) and Tabarak Dar (HK)
Player of the match: Riazat Ali Shah (Uga)

- Uganda won the toss and elected to field.

31 January 2025
09:00
Scorecard

Uganda; 275 (46.5 overs)	v	Bahrain; 125 (38.2 overs)
Cyrus Kakuru 69 (79); Asif Ali 5/11 (2.5 overs)		Rishabh Ramesh 45 (79); Alpesh Ramjani 5/15 (6.2 overs)

Uganda won by 150 runs
Hong Kong Cricket Club, Wong Nai Chung Gap
Umpires: Shelton D'Cruz (HK) and John Prakash (HK)
Player of the match: Alpesh Ramjani (Uga)

- Bahrain won the toss and elected to field.

1 February 2025
09:00
Scorecard

Bahrain; 134 (41.1 overs)	v	Hong Kong; 137/4 (31.5 overs)
Asif Ali 29 (50); Nasrulla Rana 4/22 (10 overs)		Babar Hayat 61 (71); Imran Khan 2/22 (8 overs)

Hong Kong won by 6 wickets
Mission Road Ground, Mong Kok
Umpires: Shelton D'Cruz (HK) and John Prakash (HK)
Player of the match: Nasrulla Rana (HK)

- Bahrain won the toss and elected to bat.

==== Final ====
2 February 2025
09:00
Scorecard

Hong Kong; 234 (49.2 overs)	v	Uganda; 166 (42.2 overs)
Anshuman Rath 107 (129); Cosmas Kyewuta 3/45 (10 overs)		Dinesh Nakrani 49 (78); Nasrulla Rana 5/29 (8.2 overs)

Hong Kong won by 68 runs
Mission Road Ground, Mong Kok
Umpires: Tabarak Dar (HK) and John Prakash (HK)
Player of the match: Anshuman Rath (HK)

- Uganda won the toss and elected to field.

==== 3rd place play-off ====
3 February 2025
09:00
Scorecard

Bahrain; 77 (21.2 overs)	v	Hong Kong A 79/3 (18.3 overs)
Rizwan Butt 17 (16); Sheryar Khan 5/29 (9.2 overs)		Shahid Wasif 31* (32); Asif Mohammad 2/19 (3 overs)

Hong Kong A won by 7 wickets
Mission Road Ground, Mong Kok
Umpires: Tabarak Dar (HK) and John Prakash (HK)
Player of the match: Sheryar Khan (Hong Kong A)

- Bahrain won the toss and elected to bat.

=== Other matches ===
3 February 2025
09:00
Scorecard

Tanzania; 187/9 (47 overs)	v	Italy; 188/5 (25.4 overs)
Kassim Nassoro 97* (106); Crishan Kalugamage 3/21 (6 overs)		Justin Mosca 52 (26); Laksh Bakrania 2/38 (4 overs)

Italy won by 5 wickets
Hong Kong Cricket Club, Wong Nai Chung Gap
Player of the match: Crishan Kalugamage (Ita)

- Tanzania won the toss and elected to bat.

4 February 2025
09:00
Scorecard

Hong Kong A 243 (49.5 overs)	v	Tanzania; 131 (43.4 overs)
Sahal Malvernkar 64 (89); Khalidy Juma 3/27 (7 overs)		Kassim Nassoro 25 (49); Daniel Mapp 5/18 (7 overs)

Hong Kong A won by 112 runs
Kowloon Cricket Club, Kowloon
Player of the match: Sahal Malvernkar (Hong Kong A)

- Hong Kong A won the toss and elected to bat.

== Squads ==
Bahrain	Hong Kong	Italy	Singapore	Tanzania	Uganda
Ahmer Bin Nasir (c, wk); Abdul Majid Abbasi; Fiaz Ahmed; Sohail Ahmed; Asif Ali; Imran Anwar; Junaid Aziz; Shahbaz Badar (wk); Muhammed Basil; Rizwan Butt; Imran Khan; Prashant Kurup; Rishabh Ramesh; Sai Sarthak; Abid Ullah Shah; Asif Shaikh	Yasim Murtaza (c); Babar Hayat (vc); Zeeshan Ali (wk); Haroon Arshad; Waqas Barkat; Martin Coetzee; Ateeq Iqbal; Aizaz Khan; Ehsan Khan; Nizakat Khan; Shiv Mathur (wk); Nasrulla Rana; Anshuman Rath; Ayush Shukla	Marcus Campopiano (c); Zain Ali; Gareth Berg; Stefano di Bartolomeo; Thomas Draca; Rakibul Hasan; Crishan Kalugamage; Wayne Madsen; Nicholas Maiolo; Gian-Piero Meade (wk); Anthony Mosca; Justin Mosca; Jaspreet Singh; Grant Stewart	Manpreet Singh (c); Vinoth Baskaran; Harsha Bharadwaj; Aryaveer Chaudhary; Aman Desai (wk); Suryansh Gulecha; Amartya Kaul; Hari Kukreja; Riaan Naik; Thilipan Omaidurai; Janak Prakash; Raoul Sharma; Pranav Sudarshan; Ishaan Swaney	Kassim Nassoro (c); Akhil Anil; Laksh Bakrania; Mohamed Issa; Arshan Jasani; Khalidy Juma; Ally Kimote; Omary Kitunda; Rajendra Maringanti; Simba Mbaki; Amal Rajeevan (wk); Ivan Selemani; Sivaraj Selvaraj; Mukesh Suthar	Riazat Ali Shah (c); Fred Achelam (wk); Raghav Dhawan; Cyrus Kakuru (wk); Cosmas Kyewuta; Shrideep Mangela; Juma Miyagi; Pascal Murungi; Dinesh Nakrani; Frank Nsubuga; Robinson Obuya; Alpesh Ramjani; Henry Ssenyondo; Kenneth Waiswa

== Fixtures ==
6 February 2025
09:00
Scorecard

Singapore; 171 (46.3 overs)	v	Hong Kong; 175/3 (36.4 overs)
Janak Prakash 58 (99); Nasrulla Rana 3/45 (10 overs)		Anshuman Rath 90* (116); Manpreet Singh 3/38 (7.4 overs)

Hong Kong won by 7 wickets
Mission Road Ground, Mong Kok
Umpires: Lyndon Hannibal (SL) and Durga Subedi (Nep)
Player of the match: Anshuman Rath (HK)

- Hong Kong won the toss and elected to field.
- Aryaveer Chaudhary, Hari Kukreja and Thilipan Omaidurai (Sin) all made their List A debuts.

7 February 2025
09:00
Scorecard

Uganda; 249/9 (50 overs)	v	Bahrain; 197 (44.1 overs)
Raghav Dhawan 85 (105); Imran Khan 3/46 (10 overs)		Asif Ali 85 (92); Juma Miyagi 4/52 (10 overs)

Uganda won by 52 runs
Mission Road Ground, Mong Kok
Umpires: Tanvir Ahmed (Ban) and Tabarak Dar (HK)
Player of the match: Raghav Dhawan (Uga)

- Bahrain won the toss and elected to field.
- Imran Khan, Rishabh Ramesh, Sai Sarthak and Asif Shaikh (Bhr) all made their List A debuts.

7 February 2025
09:00
Scorecard

Tanzania; 94 (25.5 overs)	v	Italy; 95/2 (13.5 overs)
Sivaraj Selvaraj 28 (43); Crishan Kalugamage 3/17 (4.5 overs)		Marcus Campopiano 44* (41); Khalidy Juma 1/24 (5 overs)

Italy won by 8 wickets
Kowloon Cricket Club, Kowloon
Umpires: Lyndon Hannibal (SL) and Viswanadan Kalidas (Mas)
Player of the match: Grant Stewart (Ita)

- Italy won the toss and elected to field.
- Arshan Jasani and Sivaraj Selvaraj (Tan) both made their List A debuts.

9 February 2025
09:00
Scorecard

Singapore; 170 (41 overs)	v	Italy; 175/4 (30.4 overs)
Aman Desai 59 (71); Jaspreet Singh 3/30 (8 overs)		Anthony Mosca 48* (56); Ishaan Swaney 1/32 (7.4 overs)

Italy won by 6 wickets
Mission Road Ground, Mong Kok
Umpires: Viswanadan Kalidas (Mas) and Ramasamy Venkatesh (HK)
Player of the match: Anthony Mosca (Ita)

- Italy won the toss and elected to field.

9 February 2025
09:00
Scorecard

Bahrain; 182 (49.4 overs)	v	Hong Kong; 187/1 (34.5 overs)
Sohail Ahmed 70* (66); Ehsan Khan 3/17 (10 overs)		Martin Coetzee 100* (109); Sai Sarthak 1/5 (1 over)

Hong Kong won by 9 wickets
Kowloon Cricket Club, Kowloon
Umpires: Tanvir Ahmed (Ban) and Durga Subedi (Nep)
Player of the match: Martin Coetzee (HK)

- Hong Kong won the toss and elected to field.
- Martin Coetzee (HK) scored his first century in List A cricket.

10 February 2025
09:00
Scorecard

Tanzania; 139 (41.2 overs)	v	Bahrain; 140/4 (34.1 overs)
Akhil Anil 57 (97); Imran Anwar 4/22 (8 overs)		Sohail Ahmed 57* (87); Khalidy Juma 3/52 (8.1 overs)

Bahrain won by 6 wickets
Mission Road Ground, Mong Kok
Umpires: Tabarak Dar (HK) and Durga Subedi (Nep)
Player of the match: Imran Anwar (Bhr)

- Bahrain won the toss and elected to field.
- Muhammed Basil (Bhr) made his List A debut.

10 February 2025
09:00
Scorecard

Singapore; 243/9 (50 overs)	v	Uganda; 245/2 (40.4 overs)
Aman Desai 66 (80); Henry Ssenyondo 4/36 (9 overs)		Raghav Dhawan 71* (66); Manpreet Singh 1/50 (10 overs)

Uganda won by 8 wickets
Kowloon Cricket Club, Kowloon
Umpires: Lyndon Hannibal (SL) and Ramasamy Venkatesh (HK)
Player of the match: Raghav Dhawan (Uga)

- Uganda won the toss and elected to field.
- Raoul Sharma (Sin) made his List A debut.

12 February 2025
09:00
Scorecard

Hong Kong	v	Tanzania

Match abandoned
Mission Road Ground, Mong Kok
Umpires: Tanvir Ahmed (Ban) and Viswanadan Kalidas (Mas)

- No toss.
- No play was possible due to rain.

12 February 2025
09:00
Scorecard

Italy	v	Uganda

Match abandoned
Kowloon Cricket Club, Kowloon
Umpires: Tabarak Dar (HK) and Ramasamy Venkatesh (HK)

- No toss.
- No play was possible due to rain.

13 February 2025
09:00
Scorecard

Singapore; 117 (33.4 overs)	v	Bahrain; 123/2 (24.4 overs)
Suryansh Gulecha 34 (40); Sohail Ahmed 4/17 (4.4 overs)		Fiaz Ahmed 50* (58); Harsha Bharadwaj 1/25 (4.4 overs)

Bahrain won by 8 wickets
Mission Road Ground, Mong Kok
Umpires: Viswanadan Kalidas (Mas) and Ramasamy Venkatesh (HK)
Player of the match: Sohail Ahmed (Bhr)

- Bahrain won the toss and elected to field.
- Fiaz Ahmed, Abid Ullah Shah (Bhr) and Suryansh Gulecha (Sin) all made their List A debuts.
- Singapore were eliminated as a result of this match

13 February 2025
09:00
Scorecard

Uganda; 276 (49.5 overs)	v	Hong Kong; 200 (46.3 overs)
Alpesh Ramjani 68 (63); Ehsan Khan 4/53 (10 overs)		Zeeshan Ali 51 (64); Alpesh Ramjani 4/18 (9 overs)

Uganda won by 76 runs
Kowloon Cricket Club, Kowloon
Umpires: Tanvir Ahmed (Ban) and Durga Subedi (Nep)
Player of the match: Alpesh Ramjani (Uga)

- Hong Kong won the toss and elected to field.

15 February 2025
09:00
Scorecard

Uganda; 148 (41.1 overs)	v	Tanzania; 89 (29.1 overs)
Raghav Dhawan 63 (102); Ally Kimote 4/20 (8.1 overs)		Arshan Jasani 23 (46); Juma Miyagi 6/17 (8.1 overs)

Uganda won by 59 runs
Mission Road Ground, Mong Kok
Umpires: Tabarak Dar (HK) and Lyndon Hannibal (SL)
Player of the match: Juma Miyagi (Uga)

- Tanzania won the toss and elected to field.

15 February 2025
09:00
Scorecard

Bahrain; 130 (43.2 overs)	v	Italy; 132/4 (18.1 overs)
Rizwan Butt 53* (64); Gareth Berg 3/12 (6 overs)		Marcus Campopiano 54 (46); Rizwan Butt 3/46 (7 overs)

Italy won by 6 wickets
Kowloon Cricket Club, Kowloon
Umpires: Durga Subedi (Nep) and Ramasamy Venkatesh (HK)
Player of the match: Marcus Campopiano (Ita)

- Bahrain won the toss and elected to bat.
- Thomas Draca (Ita) made his List A debut.

16 February 2025
09:00
Scorecard

Hong Kong; 146 (36 overs)	v	Italy; 147/3 (23.2 overs)
Yasim Murtaza 37 (45); Jaspreet Singh 4/27 (6 overs)		Wayne Madsen 73* (72); Ayush Shukla 2/19 (5 overs)

Italy won by 7 wickets
Mission Road Ground, Mong Kok
Umpires: Tanvir Ahmed (Ban) and Viswanadan Kalidas (Mas)
Player of the match: Wayne Madsen (Ita)

- Italy won the toss and elected to field.

16 February 2025
09:00
Scorecard

Tanzania; 189 (45.5 overs)	v	Singapore; 98 (28.1 overs)
Akhil Anil 43 (48); Suryansh Gulecha 3/25 (5.5 overs)		Manpreet Singh 38 (54); Kassim Nassoro 4/23 (10 overs)

Tanzania won by 91 runs
Kowloon Cricket Club, Kowloon
Umpires: Tabarak Dar (HK) and Lyndon Hannibal (SL)
Player of the match: Akhil Anil (Tan)

- Singapore won the toss and elected to field.
