= 2011 Africa Twenty20 Division Three =

2011 ICC World Cricket League Africa Region Twenty20 Division Three
- Administrator: International Cricket Council
- Cricket format: Twenty20
- Tournament format: Round-robin
- Host: Ghana
- Champions: Rwanda
- Participants: 7
- Matches: 12
- Official website: ICC Africa Region

The 2011 ICC World Cricket League Africa Region Twenty20 Division Three was a cricket tournament that took place between 24 and 27 February 2011. Ghana hosted the event.

== Teams ==
Teams that qualified are as follows:

=== Pool A ===
- Cameroon
- Lesotho
- Rwanda

=== Group B ===
- Gambia
- Mali
- Morocco
- Seychelles

== Fixtures ==
=== Group stage ===
==== Pool A ====
Team	P	W	L	T	NR	Points	NRR
Rwanda	2	2	0	0	0	4	+2.093
Lesotho	2	1	1	0	0	2	+1.748
Cameroon	2	0	2	0	0	0	–5.210

24 February
12.00 a.m.
Scorecard

Rwanda; 102 (20 overs)	v	Lesotho; 101/7 (20 overs)
Suhabhasis Samaz 20 (23); Suleman Seth 4/30 (6 overs)		Ralin Lemphane 28 (34); Srinath Vardhineni 3/18 (4 overs)

Rwanda won by 1 run
Achimota Field A, Accra

- Lesotho won the toss and elected to field.

25 February
12.00 a.m.
Scorecard

Cameroon; 75 (20 overs)	v	Lesotho; 77/2 (8.5 overs)
Abanda Protais 15 (27); Thabiso Mohapi 5/17 (4 overs)		Sarfaraj Patel 36* (30); Nyome Abega Julian Bi 1/11 (2 overs)

Lesotho won by 8 wickets
Achimota Field B, Accra
Umpires: Elizabeth French and Emmanuel Byiringiro (Rwa)
Player of the match: Thabiso Mohapi (Les)

- Cameroon won the toss and elected to bat.

26 February
12.00 a.m.
Scorecard

Cameroon; 30 (10.4 overs)	v	Rwanda; 34/2 (5.2 overs)
Amah Roland Gil 5 (13); Suhabhasis Samaz 3/7 (2.4 overs)		Sairam Gopalan 15 (11); Nyoma Abega Julian Bi 2/10 (3 overs)

Rwanda won by 8 wickets
Achimota Field A, Accra
Umpires: Francis Samura and Lucy Mayunga (Tan)
Player of the match: Andre Kayitera (Rwa)

- Cameroon won the toss and elected to bat.

==== Pool B ====
Team	P	W	L	T	NR	Points	NRR
Seychelles	3	3	0	0	0	6	+2.267
Morocco	3	2	1	0	0	4	–0.076
Gambia	3	1	2	0	0	2	–0.045
Mali	3	0	3	0	0	0	–2.630

24 February
12.00 a.m.
Scorecard

Gambia; 58 (12.1 overs)	v	Morocco; 59/2 (15.3 overs)
Bavesh Kokal 16 (9); Es-sih Soufiane 3/12 (2.1 overs)		Harmaoui Rachid 27* (38); Mbye Dumbuya 1/11 (4 overs)

Morocco won by 8 wickets
Achimota Field B, Accra
Player of the match: Harmaoui Rachid (Mar)

- Morocca won the toss and elected to field.

24 February
12.00 a.m.
Scorecard

Seychelles; 161/7 (20 overs)	v	Mali; 101 (17.4 overs)
Krishnas Naidoo 47 (44); Simon John Watson 4/24 (3 overs)		Salif Sissoko 27 (17); Kaushalkumar Jadavjibha 4/11 (4 overs)

Seychelles won by 60 runs
Achimota Field A, Accra
Umpires: Elizabeth French and Asif Panjuwani
Player of the match: Kaushalkumar Jadavjibha (Sey)

- Mali won the toss and elected to field.

25 February
3.30 p.m.
Scorecard

Seychelles; 85 (17 overs)	v	Gambia; 70 (19 overs)
Sundesh Kunder 18 (20); Mbye Dumbuya 3/12 (4 overs)		Aniru Conteh 19 (34); Arvind Nanji Bhuva 5/8 (3 overs)

Seychelles won by 15 runs
Achimota Field A, Accra
Umpires: Emmanuel Bruce Okin and Stewart Cole
Player of the match: Arvind Nanji Bhuva (Sey)

- Seychelles won the toss and elected to bat.

25 February
12.00 a.m.
Scorecard

Mali; 72 (19.3 overs)	v	Morocco; 76/4 (13.5 overs)
Djery Samoura 13 (12); Es-sih Soufianu 3/12 (4 overs)		Harmaoui Rachid 37* (51); Simon John Watson 4/16 (3.5 overs)

Morocco won by 6 wickets
Achimota Field A, Accra
Player of the match: Harmaoui Rachid (Mar)

- Morocco won the toss and elected to field.

26 February
12.00 a.m.
Scorecard

Mali; 67/9 (20 overs)	v	Gambia; 68/5 (12.1 overs)
Habibou N'Diaye 16 (40); David Prince Johnson 4/5 (3 overs)		George Greywoode 18 (21); Mohamed Seyba Toure 4/25 (4 overs)

Gambia won by 5 wickets
Achimota Field B, Accra
Umpires: Stewart Cole and Elizabeth French
Player of the match: David Prince Johnson (Gam)

- Gambia won the toss and elected to field.

26 February
12.000 p.m.
Scorecard

Seychelles; 164/4 (20 overs)	v	Morocco; 103 (19.3 overs)
Harikrishnan Kamalan 55* (53); Harmaoui Rachid 2/23 (4 overs)		Harmaoui Rachid 22 (33); Harikrishnan Kamalan 5/12 (4 overs)

Seychelles won by 61 runs
Achimota Field A, Accra
Player of the match: Harikrishnan Kamalan (Sey)

- Morocco won the toss and elected to field.

=== Play-offs ===
27 February
9.00 a.m.
Scorecard

Cameroon; 87/9 (20 overs)	v	Gambia; 88/2 (16.1 overs)
N Patipe Boris Franck 22 (25); Gabriel Njie 4/13 (4 overs)		Moses Bahoum 51* (51); Ngueudam Michel Raoul 2/15 (4 overs)

Gambia won by 8 wickets
Achimota Field B, Accra
Umpires: Emmanuel Bruce Okin and Stewart Cole
Player of the match: Moses Bahoum (Gam)

- Gambia won the toss and elected to field.

27 February
9.00 a.m.
Scorecard

Lesotho; 93 (19 overs)	v	Morocco; 76 (19.5 overs)
Darfaraj Patel 26 (34); Guelzim Redouane 4/4 (3 overs)		Bekkouri Brahim 19 (33); Suleman Seth 4/13 (4 overs)

Lesotho won by 17 runs
Achimota Field A, Accra
Umpires: Emmanuel Byiringiro (Rwa) and Francis Samura
Player of the match: Darfaraj Patel (Les)

- Morocco won the toss and elected to field.

27 February
1.15 p.m.
Scorecard

Rwanda; 125/4 (20 overs)	v	Seychelles; 117/7 (20 overs)
Audifax Byiringiro 31 (44); Harikrishnan Kamalan 1/11 (2 overs)		Shiva Nagaraja 41 (46); Eyode Mutuyimana 3/24 (4 overs)

Rwanda won by 8 runs
Achimota Field A, Accra
Umpires: Lucy Mayunga (Tan) and Asif Panjwani
Player of the match: Harikrishnan Kamalan (Rwa)

- Rwanda won the toss and elected to bat.

== See also ==
- 2012 ICC World Twenty20 Qualifier
- World Cricket League Africa Region
