= List of Lesotho Twenty20 International cricketers =

This is a list of Lesotho Twenty20 International cricketers.

In April 2018, the ICC decided to grant full Twenty20 International (T20I) status to all its members. Therefore, all Twenty20 matches played between Lesotho and other ICC members after 1 January 2019 have the full T20I status. Lesotho played their first T20I against Eswatini on 16 October 2021 during the 2021 ICC Men's T20 World Cup Africa Qualifier.

This list comprises all members of the Lesotho cricket team who have played at least one T20I match. It is initially arranged in the order in which each player won his first Twenty20 cap. Where more than one player won his first Twenty20 cap in the same match, those players are listed alphabetically by surname.

== Key ==
General

- ‡ – Captain
- † – Wicket-keeper
- First – Year of debut
- Last – Year of latest game
- Mat – Number of matches played

Batting

- Runs – Runs scored in career
- HS – Highest score
- Avg – Runs scored per dismissal
- * – Batsman remained not out
- 50 – Number of half centuries

Bowling

- Balls – Balls bowled in career
- Wkt – Wickets taken in career
- BBI – Best bowling in an innings
- Ave – Average runs per wicket

Fielding

- Ca – Catches taken
- St – Stumpings affected

== List of players ==
Statistics are correct as of 25 October 2026.

Lesotho T20I cricketers
General					Batting				Bowling				Fielding		Ref
No.	Name	First	Last	Mat	Runs	HS	Avg	50	Balls	Wkt	BBI	Ave	Ca	St	Ref
1	Ts'episo Chaoana	2021	2026	37	150	26*	7.89	0	733	33	3/13	26.51	13	0	
2	Yahya Jakda	2021	2026	19	56	16	3.50	0	239	12	3/32	31.08	4	0	
3	Maaz Khan‡	2021	2026	39	744	96	20.66	6	54	2	2/24	44.50	12	0	
4	Lefulere Monanthane	2021	2026	25	93	33	4.42	0	322	15	3/29	30.13	6	0	
5	Mthimkhulu Leporoporo	2021	2026	11	10	5	2.50	0	150	9	2/8	23.88	0	0	
6	Molai Matsau	2021	2024	14	28	22	4.66	0	152	7	2/18	34.14	1	0	
7	Omar Hussain	2021	2024	9	46	33	5.75	0	48	3	2/28	24.00	3	0	
8	Ayaj Patel	2021	2022	8	68	28	9.71	0	–	–	–	–	2	0	
9	Samir Patel‡	2021	2022	13	160	35*	16.00	0	12	0	–	–	3	0	
10	Sarfaraj Patel	2021	2021	6	37	10*	7.40	0	102	6	2/19	24.66	1	0	
11	Chachole Tlali‡†	2021	2026	39	480	57	13.33	1	–	–	–	–	22	4	
12	Gladwin Thamae	2021	2026	26	111	19	7.92	0	361	21	4/18	23.66	6	0	
13	Ts'eliso Letsitsa	2021	2021	1	0	0*	–	0	–	–	–	–	0	0	
14	Mohleki Leoela	2021	2026	19	37	11	3.08	0	24	0	–	–	7	0	
15	Khan Arbaaz	2022	2022	2	17	17	8.50	0	18	1	1/10	20.00	0	0	
16	Lerotholi Gabriel	2022	2026	31	326	45*	11.24	0	174	4	1/18	63.75	5	0	
17	Waseem Yaqoob	2022	2026	21	261	50	14.50	1	386	31	6/18	17.09	3	0	
18	Vijayakumar Jayant	2022	2024	10	59	31	8.42	0	47	1	1/19	76.00	0	0	
19	Ressebile Khanyapa	2024	2024	5	19	14	9.50	0	–	–	–	–	1	0	
20	Lebona Leokaoke	2024	2026	18	274	71*	19.57	2	216	8	2/23	35.12	3	0	
21	Thabiso Ramphoma	2024	2024	4	10	5	3.33	0	22	2	1/0	11.00	0	0	
22	Sentle Leluma	2024	2024	1	–	–	–	–	6	0	–	–	0	0	
23	Sajid Patel	2024	2024	4	53	42	13.25	0	1	0	–	–	0	0	
24	Bahlakoana Mejaro	2024	2026	14	14	6	2.33	0	198	10	3/13	26.60	1	0	
25	Abraar Khan	2026	2026	8	19	12	3.80	0	12	1	1/10	10.00	1	0	
26	Ajaz Patel	2026	2026	4	14	7	3.50	0	30	2	1/7	12.50	2	0	
27	Azim Patel	2026	2026	3	6	6	2.66	0	–	–	–	–	2	0	
28	Inshaf Farook	2026	2026	10	110	25*	13.75	0	182	10	2/19	17.60	4	0	
29	Mohammed Jamadar	2026	2026	5	75	31	15.00	0	96	2	1/17	45.00	2	0	
30	Malei Khauta	2026	2026	10	13	8	7.25	0	102	5	2/14	39.20	2	0	
31	Tanki Khetsi	2026	2026	7	13	7	2.16	0	24	1	1/20	45.00	2	0	
32	Shekoe Makalo	2026	2026	2	–	–	–	–	–	–	–	–	0	0	
33	Hassan Akbani	2026	2026	1	1	1	1.00	0	–	–	–	–	1	0	
34	Mohmed Duvesh Patel	2026	2026	5	125	63	25.00	1	76	7	4/18	9.71	1	0	
35	Jabulani Matjatje	2026	2026	1	0	0	0.00	0	6	0	–	–	0	0	
