= List of Cameroon Twenty20 International cricketers =

This is a list of Cameroon Twenty20 International cricketers.

In April 2018, the ICC decided to grant full Twenty20 International (T20I) status to all its members. Therefore, all Twenty20 matches played between Cameroon and other ICC members after 1 January 2019 have the T20I status. Cameroon played their first T20I matches in November 2021 during the 2021 ICC T20 World Cup Africa Qualifier in Kigali.

This list comprises all members of the Cameroon cricket team who have played at least one T20I match. It is initially arranged in the order in which each player won his first Twenty20 cap. Where more than one player won their first Twenty20 cap in the same match, they are listed alphabetically by surname.

== Key ==
General

- ‡ – Captain
- † – Wicket-keeper
- First – Year of debut
- Last – Year of latest game
- Mat – Number of matches played

Batting

- Runs – Runs scored in career
- HS – Highest score
- Avg – Runs scored per dismissal
- * – Batsman remained not out
- 50 – Number of half centuries

Bowling

- Balls – Balls bowled in career
- Wkt – Wickets taken in career
- BBI – Best bowling in an innings
- Ave – Average runs per wicket

Fielding

- Ca – Catches taken
- St – Stumpings affected

== List of players ==
Statistics are correct as of 29 May 2026.

Cameroon T20I cricketers
General					Batting				Bowling				Fielding		Ref
No.	Name	First	Last	Mat	Runs	HS	Avg	50	Balls	Wkt	BBI	Ave	Ca	St	Ref
1	Protais Abanda	2021	2022	13	59	16	4.91	0	–	–	–	–	1	0	
2	Julien Abega‡	2021	2026	27	114	19	4.15	0	433	25	5/24	21.60	3	0	
3	Roland Amah	2021	2023	17	158	20	9.87	0	12	0	–	–	1	0	
4	Maxwell Fru	2021	2021	4	16	13	4.00	0	78	5	3/42	27.40	1	0	
5	Dipita Loic	2021	2026	27	159	39	7.22	0	417	22	3/15	21.27	3	0	
6	Appolinaire Mengoumou	2021	2026	14	54	22	6.75	0	79	5	3/6	19.80	1	0	
7	Faustin Mpegna‡	2021	2024	12	25	8*	3.57	0	12	0	–	–	2	0	
8	Charles Ondoa†	2021	2022	11	30	10	5.00	0	–	–	–	–	2	0	
9	Idriss Tchakou†	2021	2026	28	176	26	6.76	0	38	4	3/4	16.50	6	0	
10	Alain Toube†	2021	2026	28	211	46	8.11	0	192	10	4/13	25.40	12	2	
11	Bruno Toube	2021	2026	26	409	49	17.04	0	398	23	3/13	21.43	5	0	
12	Alexis Balla	2021	2024	16	34	7	2.83	0	6	0	–	–	3	0	
13	Narcisse Ndouteng	2021	2023	5	10	9*	5.00	0	31	2	2/58	34.50	1	0	
14	Abdoulaye Aminou†	2022	2026	23	67	22	4.46	0	–	–	–	–	2	0	
15	Kulbhushan Jadhav	2022	2023	6	49	22*	9.80	0	30	0	–	–	1	0	
16	Roger Atangana	2022	2026	20	62	28	5.63	0	269	17	3/3	13.76	2	0	
17	Veron Bomnyuy	2024	2026	11	59	16*	11.80	0	54	1	1/6	49.00	0	0	
18	Honestly Kinga	2024	2026	7	14	10*	7.00	0	–	–	–	–	2	0	
19	Sun Assegon	2024	2024	3	1	1	0.50	0	–	–	–	–	0	0	
20	Junior Alembe	2026	2026	4	6	6*	2.00	0	–	–	–	–	1	0	
