= Nasibu Mapunda =

Tanzanian cricketer (born 1991)

Personal information
- Born: 12 August 1991 (age 35)

International information
- National side: Tanzania
- T20I debut (cap 7): 2 November 2021 v Mozambique
- Last T20I: 18 November 2021 v Kenya
- Source: Cricinfo, 18 November 2021

Nasibu Mapunda (born 12 August 1991) is a Tanzanian cricketer. He played in the 2014 ICC World Cricket League Division Five tournament. In July 2018, he was part of Tanzania's squad in the Eastern sub-region group for the 2018–19 ICC World Twenty20 Africa Qualifier tournament. In October 2021, he was named in Tanzania's Twenty20 International (T20I) squad for their matches in Group B of the 2021 ICC Men's T20 World Cup Africa Qualifier tournament in Rwanda. He made his T20I debut on 2 November 2021 against Mozambique. Later the same month, he was named in Tanzania's squad for the Regional Final of the 2021 ICC Men's T20 World Cup Africa Qualifier tournament, also in Rwanda.
