= Integrated Polytechnic Regional College Ground =

Cricket ground in Kigali, Rwanda

Coordinates: 1°58′41.2″S 30°06′31.8″E

- Kicukiro Oval, IPRC Kigali

Ground information
- Location: Kigali, Rwanda
- Country: Rwanda
- Establishment: 2021
- Capacity: 10000
- End names
- n/a n/a

International information
- First T20I: 16 October 2021: Eswatini v Lesotho
- Last T20I: 9 December 2022: Cameroon v Tanzania
- First WT20I: 9 June 2022: Botswana v Kenya
- Last WT20I: 15 June 2023: Rwanda v Kenya
- As of 17 June 2023; Source: ESPNcricinfo

The Integrated Polytechnic Regional College Ground is a cricket ground, in Kigali, Rwanda.

In October 2021, the ground was the venue for Group A of the 2021 ICC Men's T20 World Cup Africa Qualifier which involved men's national cricket teams of Eswatini, Ghana, Lesotho, Malawi, Seychelles, Uganda and the hosts Rwanda. Ahead of the start of the tournament, the ground underwent major renovation to reach ICC accreditation levels.
