= Jitin Singh =

Tanzanian cricketer (born 1984)

Personal information
- Born: 28 February 1984 (age 42)
- Batting: Right handed
- Bowling: Right arm Medium

International information
- National side: Tanzania
- T20I debut (cap 3): 2 November 2021 v Mozambique
- Last T20I: 30 August 2023 v Rwanda

Career statistics
Competition	T20I
Matches	24
Runs scored	219
Batting average	14.60
100s/50s	0/1
Top score	60
Balls bowled	26
Wickets	4
Bowling average	12.00
5 wickets in innings	0
10 wickets in match	0
Best bowling	3/35
Catches/stumpings	2/–
- Source: Cricinfo, 6 November 2024

Jitin Singh (born 28 February 1984) is a Tanzanian cricketer. He was named in Tanzania's squad for the 2016 ICC World Cricket League Division Five tournament in Jersey, and played six matches of the tournament. In October 2021, he was named in Tanzania's Twenty20 International (T20I) squad for their matches in Group B of the 2021 ICC Men's T20 World Cup Africa Qualifier tournament in Rwanda. He made his T20I debut on 2 November 2021, against Mozambique. Singh's 60 runs in 42 balls on debut was the second-highest score in the match, which helped Tanzania win by 87 runs. Later the same month, Singh was named in Tanzania's squad for the Regional Final of the 2021 ICC Men's T20 World Cup Africa Qualifier tournament, also in Rwanda.
