= Riziki Kiseto =

Tanzanian cricketer (born 1989)

Personal information
- Born: 14 October 1989 (age 37); Dar-es-Salaam, Tanzania

International information
- National side: Tanzania
- T20I debut (cap 6): 2 November 2021 v Mozambique
- Last T20I: 22 December 2022 v Rwanda
- Source: Cricinfo, 25 December 2022

Riziki Kiseto (born 14 October 1989) is a Tanzanian cricketer. He played in the 2014 ICC World Cricket League Division Five tournament. In July 2018, he was part of Tanzania's squad in the Eastern sub-region group for the 2018–19 ICC World Twenty20 Africa Qualifier tournament. In October 2021, he was named in Tanzania's Twenty20 International (T20I) squad for their matches in Group B of the 2021 ICC Men's T20 World Cup Africa Qualifier tournament in Rwanda. He made his T20I debut on 2 November 2021 against Mozambique. Later the same month, he was named as the vice-captain of Tanzania's squad for the Regional Final of the 2021 ICC Men's T20 World Cup Africa Qualifier tournament, also in Rwanda.
