= Arshan Jasani =

Tanzanian cricketer (born 1998)

Personal information
- Born: 15 December 1998 (age 27)

International information
- National side: Tanzania
- T20I debut (cap 13): 6 November 2021 v Cameroon
- Last T20I: 20 November 2021 v Nigeria
- Source: Cricinfo, 20 November 2021

Arshan Jasani (born 15 December 1998) is a Tanzanian cricketer. He played in the 2014 ICC World Cricket League Division Five tournament. In October 2021, he was named in Tanzania's Twenty20 International (T20I) squad for their matches in Group B of the 2021 ICC Men's T20 World Cup Africa Qualifier tournament in Rwanda. He made his T20I debut on 6 November 2021, against Cameroon. Later the same month, he was named in Tanzania's squad for the Regional Final of the 2021 ICC Men's T20 World Cup Africa Qualifier tournament, also in Rwanda.

Most recently played a pivotal part opening the batting for Murrumbeena Cricket Club's first eleven premiership in Cricket Southern Bayside based in Melbourne, Australia.
