= Dinesh Nakrani =

Ugandan cricketer

Personal information
- Full name: Dinesh Magan Nakrani
- Born: 21 September 1991 (age 35); Kutch, Gujarat, India
- Batting: Left-handed
- Bowling: Left-arm medium

International information
- National side: Uganda
- T20I debut (cap 6): 20 May 2019 v Botswana
- Last T20I: 26 November 2023 v Zimbabwe
- Source: ESPNcricinfo, 9 June 2023

Dinesh Nakrani (born 21 September 1991) is an Indian-born cricketer who represents the Uganda cricket team. He is an all-rounder who bats left-handed and bowls left-arm medium pace. He made his international debut for Uganda in 2018, having previously played for Saurashtra in Indian domestic cricket.

== Career in India ==
Nakrani was born on 21 September 1991 in Kutch district, Gujarat, India. He made his Twenty20 debut for Saurashtra against Maharashtra in the Syed Mushtaq Ali Trophy in India on 31 March 2014.

== Career in Uganda ==
Nakrani moved to Uganda in 2016 to work for the Keshwala Group, whose owner Ranmal Keshwala was a trustee of the Uganda Cricket Association. He began playing tape-ball cricket in local leagues soon after his arrival.

In July 2018, he was part of Uganda's squad in the Eastern sub-region group for the 2018–19 ICC World Twenty20 Africa Qualifier tournament. He was the leading run-scorer for Uganda in their opening match, against Kenya, making 88 not out. In the same match, he also made an unbeaten partnership of 167 runs for the fourth wicket, with Riazat Ali Shah. In the final match of the Eastern sub-region group, also against Kenya, Nakrani scored 102 not out, and was named the man of the match. He also finished as the leading run-scorer in the qualifying group, with 320 runs in six matches.

In September 2018, he was named in Uganda's squad for the 2018 Africa T20 Cup. He was the leading run-scorer for Uganda in the tournament, with 84 runs in four matches. The following month, he was named in Uganda's squad for the 2018 ICC World Cricket League Division Three tournament in Oman. Ahead of the tournament, he was named as the player to watch in Uganda's squad.

In May 2019, he was named in Uganda's squad for the Regional Finals of the 2018–19 ICC T20 World Cup Africa Qualifier tournament in Uganda. He made his Twenty20 International (T20I) debut against Botswana on 20 May 2019. In July 2019, he was one of twenty-five players named in the Ugandan training squad, ahead of the Cricket World Cup Challenge League fixtures in Oman. In November 2019, he was named in Uganda's squad for the Cricket World Cup Challenge League B tournament in Oman. He made his List A debut against Jersey, on 2 December 2019.

In October 2021, Nakrani was named in Uganda's T20I squad for the Group A matches of the 2021 ICC Men's T20 World Cup Africa Qualifier tournament in Rwanda. On 19 October 2021, in the match against Lesotho, Nakrani took his first five-wicket haul in T20Is, and equaled the record for the best bowling figures in a T20I match, with six wickets for seven runs. On 22 October 2021, in the final Group A match of the qualifier, against the Seychelles, Nakrani took his second five-wicket haul in T20Is. He also became the first bowler for Uganda to take a hat-trick in a T20I match.

In November 2021, he was named in Uganda's squad for the Regional Final of the 2021 ICC Men's T20 World Cup Africa Qualifier tournament in Rwanda. In May 2022, he was named in Uganda's side for the 2022 Uganda Cricket World Cup Challenge League B tournament.

In May 2024, he was named in Uganda’s squad for the 2024 ICC Men's T20 World Cup tournament.
