= List of Tanzania Twenty20 International cricketers =

This is a list of Tanzanian Twenty20 International cricketers.

In April 2018, the ICC decided to grant full Twenty20 International (T20I) status to all its members. Therefore, all Twenty20 matches played between Tanzania and other ICC members after 1 January 2019 are eligible to have full T20I status. Tanzania played their first T20I matches in November 2021 during the 2021 ICC T20 World Cup Africa Qualifier in Kigali.

This list comprises all members of the Tanzania cricket team who have played at least one T20I match. It is initially arranged in the order in which each player won his first Twenty20 cap. Where more than one player won their first Twenty20 cap in the same match, their names are listed alphabetically by surname.

== Key ==
General

- ‡ – Captain
- † – Wicket-keeper
- First – Year of debut
- Last – Year of latest game
- Mat – Number of matches played

Batting

- Runs – Runs scored in career
- HS – Highest score
- Avg – Runs scored per dismissal
- * – Batsman remained not out
- 50 – Half centuries scored
- 100 – Centuries scored

Bowling

- Balls – Balls bowled in career
- Wkt – Wickets taken in career
- BBI – Best bowling in an innings
- Ave – Average runs per wicket

Fielding

- Ca – Catches taken
- St – Stumpings affected

== List of players ==
Statistics are correct as of 28 March 2026.

Tanzania T20I cricketers
General					Batting					Bowling				Fielding		Ref
No.	Name	First	Last	Mat	Runs	HS	Avg	50	100	Balls	Wkt	BBI	Ave	Ca	St	Ref
1	Harsheed Chohan	2021	2024	32	123	26	9.46	0	0	534	32	4/15	17.09	2	0	
2	Jatinkumar Darji	2021	2022	8	39	16	5.57	0	0	113	10	4/7	8.00	1	0	
3	Jitin Singh	2021	2023	24	219	60	14.60	1	0	26	4	3/35	12.00	2	0	
4	Salum Jumbe‡	2021	2025	66	489	76*	13.58	1	0	1,097	65	5/10	20.98	13	0	
5	Ally Kimote	2021	2026	81	345	32	13.80	0	0	1,258	90	4/13	16.04	28	0	
6	Riziki Kiseto	2021	2022	13	8	5	2.00	0	0	252	11	4/17	26.27	5	0	
7	Nasibu Mapunda†	2021	2021	7	15	15	15.00	0	0	–	–	–	–	3	3	
8	Kassim Nassoro‡	2021	2026	79	913	60	18.26	2	0	1,028	51	4/14	21.27	29	0	
9	Abhik Patwa‡	2021	2025	57	1,387	79	26.67	6	0	12	1	1/4	18.00	18	0	
10	Ivan Selemani	2021	2026	68	1,640	110	26.03	8	1	–	–	–	–	19	0	
11	SanjayKumar Thakor	2021	2024	58	477	44	13.62	0	0	1,062	65	4/4	15.07	19	0	
12	Zamoyoni Jabeneke	2021	2024	7	31	12*	15.50	0	0	36	1	1/16	25.00	3	0	
13	Arshan Jasani	2021	2021	6	185	90*	37.00	1	0	–	–	–	–	0	0	
14	Omary Kitunda†	2021	2026	59	559	46	13.30	0	0	–	–	–	–	16	11	
15	Akhil Anil	2022	2024	27	265	52*	13.94	1	0	386	23	3/15	17.78	6	0	
16	Yalinde Nkanya	2022	2026	55	10	4*	1.66	0	0	1,062	71	5/2	12.73	14	0	
17	Amal Rajeevan†	2022	2025	55	1,063	70	26.57	6	0	–	–	–	–	32	7	
18	Mohamed Issa	2022	2024	40	225	33*	13.23	0	0	348	20	3/24	21.05	14	0	
19	Abdallah Jabiri	2022	2024	18	139	27	8.68	0	0	–	–	–	–	7	0	
20	Johnson Nyambo	2022	2024	13	11	4	2.75	0	0	182	8	2/3	26.12	5	0	
21	Abdurahmani Hussein	2022	2022	2	1	1*	–	0	0	36	2	1/27	27.50	1	0	
22	Dhrumit Mehta	2022	2026	16	194	49	14.92	0	0	–	–	–	–	11	0	
23	Shaik Basha	2023	2025	15	111	43	12.33	0	0	120	9	3/32	21.22	5	0	
24	Jumanne Masquater	2024	2024	6	74	32	12.33	0	0	10	0	–	–	0	0	
25	Sefu Athumani	2024	2024	1	1	1*	–	0	0	1	0	–	–	0	0	
26	Laksh Bakrania	2024	2026	20	14	9*	14.00	0	0	395	28	4/6	11.21	8	0	
27	Mohammad Zafar Khan	2024	2024	5	67	24	22.33	0	0	–	–	–	–	0	0	
28	Khalidy Juma	2024	2026	19	6	6	1.50	0	0	397	29	4/13	13.48	2	0	
29	Acrey Hugo†	2025	2025	4	10	10*	–	0	0	–	–	–	–	1	0	
30	Arun Yadav	2025	2026	15	524	86	40.30	3	0	90	8	3/12	14.25	5	0	
31	Ajith Augastin†	2025	2026	15	367	63	33.36	4	0	128	8	2/0	14.25	7	1	
32	Mukesh Suthar	2025	2026	15	328	67*	65.60	2	0	–	–	–	–	11	0	
33	Raymond Francis	2025	2025	2	–	–	–	–	–	30	0	–	–	1	0	
34	Sivaraj Selvaraj	2025	2025	5	27	20	13.50	0	0	108	3	1/19	39.33	0	0	
35	Simba Mbaki	2025	2025	1	4	4	13.50	0	0	–	–	–	–	0	0	
