= Emmanuel Bundi =

Kenyan cricketer (born 1993)

Personal information
- Full name: Emmanuel Bundi Ringera
- Born: 8 September 1993 (age 33); Kakamega, Kenya
- Batting: Right-handed
- Bowling: Right-arm medium-fast

International information
- National side: Kenya (2011–present)
- Only ODI (cap 48): 13 September 2011 v Netherlands
- T20I debut (cap 33): 27 October 2019 v PNG
- Last T20I: 25 November 2022 v Seychelles

Career statistics
Competition	ODI	T20I	LA	T20
Matches	1	35	22	44
Runs scored	–	63	88	70
Batting average	–	6.30	8.00	6.36
100s/50s	0/0	0/0	0/0	0/0
Top score	–	21*	22	21*
Balls bowled	60	581	823	705
Wickets	0	34	24	40
Bowling average	–	18.73	28.95	20.10
5 wickets in innings	–	–	1	1
10 wickets in match	–	–	–	–
Best bowling	–	4/16	6/36	5/13
Catches/stumpings	–/–	11/–	4/–	14/–
- Source: Cricinfo, 30 January 2025

Emmanuel Bundi Ringera (born 8 September 1993) is a Kenyan cricketer. He has played in one One Day International match for the national team.

In January 2018, he was named in Kenya's squad for the 2018 ICC World Cricket League Division Two tournament. In September 2018, he was named in Kenya's squad for the 2018 Africa T20 Cup. The following month, he featured in the Kenyan team for the 2018 ICC World Cricket League Division Three tournament in Oman.

In September 2019, he was named in Kenya's squad for the 2019 ICC T20 World Cup Qualifier tournament in the United Arab Emirates. He made his Twenty20 International (T20I) debut for Kenya, against Papua New Guinea, on 27 October 2019. In November 2019, he was named in Kenya's squad for the Cricket World Cup Challenge League B tournament in Oman.

In October 2021, he was named in Kenya's squad for the Regional Final of the 2021 ICC Men's T20 World Cup Africa Qualifier tournament in Rwanda.
