= Irfan Karim =

Kenyan cricketer (born 1992)

Personal information
- Full name: Irfan Ali Karim
- Born: 25 September 1992 (age 34); London, England, United Kingdom
- Batting: Left-handed
- Bowling: Right-arm off break
- Role: Wicket-keeper
- Relatives: Aasif Karim (father)

International information
- National side: Kenya (2011–present)
- ODI debut (cap 46): 12 September 2011 v Netherlands
- Last ODI: 30 January 2014 v Scotland
- T20I debut (cap 24): 1 March 2013 v Canada
- Last T20I: 19 December 2023 v Uganda

Career statistics
Competition	ODI	T20I	FC	LA
Matches	9	58	5	57
Runs scored	396	1,277	147	1,702
Batting average	44.00	35.05	14.70	34.04
100s/50s	2/1	0/8	0/1	2/12
Top score	112	71*	59	112
Catches/stumpings	8/1	61/24	13/0	63/32
- Source: Cricinfo, 23 February 2024

Irfan Ali Karim (born 25 September 1992) is a Kenyan cricketer and a former captain of the Kenya cricket team.

Karim bats left-handed, bowls right-arm off break and also plays as a wicket-keeper. In January 2018, he was named in Kenya's squad for the 2018 ICC World Cricket League Division Two tournament. In September 2018, he featured in the Kenyan team for the 2018 Africa T20 Cup. The following month, he was part of Kenya's squad for the 2018 ICC World Cricket League Division Three tournament in Oman.

In May 2019, he was named in Kenya's squad for the Regional Finals of the 2018–19 ICC T20 World Cup Africa Qualifier tournament in Uganda. In September 2019, Karim was included in Kenya's squad for the 2019 ICC T20 World Cup Qualifier tournament in the United Arab Emirates. He was the leading run-scorer for Kenya in the tournament, with 173 runs in six matches. In November 2019, he was named the captain of Kenya's squad for the Cricket World Cup Challenge League B tournament in Oman.

In October 2021, he was named in Kenya's squad for the Regional Final of the 2021 ICC Men's T20 World Cup Africa Qualifier tournament in Rwanda.

Karim's father, Aasif Yusuf Karim, is also a former captain of the Kenya national cricket team.
