= Obed Harvey =

Ghanaian cricketer (born 1990)

Personal information
- Full name: Obed Harvey
- Born: 1 June 1990 (age 36); Ghana
- Batting: Left-handed
- Bowling: Left-arm medium
- Role: All-rounder

International information
- National side: Ghana
- T20I debut (cap 18): 18 August 2021 v Rwanda
- Last T20I: 21 September 2024 v Cameroon
- Source: Cricinfo, 17 October 2023

Obed Harvey (born 1 June 1990) is a Ghanaian cricketer. He was named in Ghana's squad for the 2017 ICC World Cricket League Division Five tournament in South Africa. He played in Ghana's opening fixture, against Germany, on 3 September 2017. He scored the most runs for Ghana in the tournament, with a total of 153 runs in five matches. He also took the most wickets for Ghana, with a total of thirteen dismissals in five matches.

In August 2021, he was named as the captain of Ghana's squad for their Twenty20 International (T20I) series against Rwanda. He made his T20I debut on 18 August 2021, against Rwanda, where he captained the team and scored 14 runs and claimed two wickets for 30 runs.
