= Lesotho national cricket team =

Lesotho
- Association: Lesotho Cricket Association

Personnel
- Captain: Maaz Khan
- Coach: Alex Maviko

International Cricket Council
- ICC status: Associate member (2017)
- ICC region: Africa
ICC Rankings	Current	Best-ever
T20I	89th	69th (2 May 2022)

International cricket
- First international: v Eswatini at Maseru, Lesotho; 1986

T20 Internationals
- First T20I: v Eswatini at IPRC Cricket Ground, Kigali; 16 October 2021
- Last T20I: v Gambia at Nigeria Cricket Federation Oval 1, Abuja; 25 October 2026
T20Is	Played	Won/Lost
Total	39	7/31 (0 ties, 1 no result)
This year	16	2/14 (0 ties, 0 no results)
- As of 25 October 2026

The Lesotho national cricket team represents Lesotho in international cricket. They became an affiliate member of the International Cricket Council (ICC) in 2001 and an associate member in 2017.

Lesotho has played international cricket since at least 1986, when they played Swaziland in Maseru. They made their official ICC debut at Division Three of the Africa Region of the ICC World Cricket League in April 2006, where they came last in the eight-team tournament.

In April 2018, the ICC granted full Twenty20 International (T20I) status to all its members. Therefore, all Twenty20 matches played between Lesotho and other ICC members after 1 January 2019 have the full T20I status.

== Records and statistics ==
International Match Summary — Lesotho

Last updated 25 October 2026

Playing Record
Format	M	W	L	T	NR	Inaugural Match
Twenty20 Internationals	39	7	31	0	1	16 October 2021

=== Twenty20 International ===
- Highest team total: 221/6 v. Eswatini, 7 June 2026 at Malkerns Country Club Oval, Malkerns.
- Highest individual score: 96, Maaz Khan v. Mozambique, 4 June 2026 at Malkerns Country Club Oval, Malkerns.
- Best individual bowling figures: 6/18, Waseem Yaqoob v. Mali, 25 September 2024 at Gymkhana Club Ground, Dar es Salaam.

Most T20I runs for Lesotho

Player	Runs	Average	Career span
Maaz Khan	744	20.66	2021–2026
Chachole Tlali	480	13.33	2021–2026
Lerotholi Gabriel	326	11.24	2022–2026
Lebona Leokaoke	274	19.54	2024–2026
Waseem Yaqoob	261	14.50	2022–2026

Most T20I wickets for Lesotho

Player	Wickets	Average	Career span
Ts'episo Chaoana	33	26.51	2021–2026
Waseem Yaqoob	31	17.09	2022–2026
Gladwin Thamae	21	23.66	2021–2026
Lefulere Monanthane	15	30.13	2021–2026
Yahya Jakda	12	31.08	2021–2026

T20I record versus other nations

Records complete to T20I #4218. Last updated 25 October 2026.

Opponent	M	W	L	T	NR	First match	First win
vs Associate Members
Botswana	6	0	6	0	0	18 November 2022	
Cameroon	1	0	1	0	0	26 September 2024	
Eswatini	9	3	6	0	0	16 October 2021	29 March 2024
Gambia	1	0	1	0	0	25 October 2026	
Ghana	2	0	2	0	0	17 October 2021	
Kenya	1	0	1	0	0	21 November 2022	
Malawi	3	0	3	0	0	22 October 2021	
Mali	2	2	0	0	0	17 November 2022	17 November 2022
Mozambique	4	1	3	0	0	2 June 2026	20 October 2026
Nigeria	1	0	1	0	0	24 October 2026	
Rwanda	2	0	1	0	1	21 October 2021	
Saint Helena	1	0	1	0	0	22 November 2022	
Seychelles	2	1	1	0	0	17 October 2021	20 November 2022
Tanzania	1	0	1	0	0	22 September 2024	
Uganda	2	0	2	0	0	19 October 2021	
Zambia	1	0	1	0	0	23 October 2026	

=== Other matches ===
For a list of selected international matches played by Lesotho, see Cricket Archive.

== See also ==
- List of Lesotho Twenty20 International cricketers
- Lesotho women's national cricket team
