= Kofi Bagabena =

Ghanaian cricketer (born 1988)

Personal information
- Full name: Kofi Stephen Bagabena
- Born: 25 November 1988 (age 37)
- Batting: Right-handed
- Bowling: Right-arm medium
- Role: Bowler

International information
- National side: Ghana
- T20I debut (cap 7): 20 May 2019 v Namibia
- Last T20I: 26 September 2024 v Mali
- Source: Cricinfo, 29 August 2025

Kofi Bagabena (born 25 November 1988) is a Ghanaian cricketer. He was named in Ghana's squad for the 2017 ICC World Cricket League Division Five tournament in South Africa. He played in Ghana's second fixture, against Vanuatu, on 4 September 2017.

In May 2019, he was named in Ghana's squad for the Regional Finals of the 2018–19 ICC T20 World Cup Africa Qualifier tournament in Uganda. He made his Twenty20 International (T20I) debut against Namibia on 20 May 2019.

On 16 October 2021, Bagabena became the first Ghanaian cricketer to take a hat-trick in a T20I match, and the second to take a five-wicket haul in T20I cricket, doing so in the match against the Seychelles, with his four overs yielding five wickets for nine runs.
