= Rexford Bakum =

Ghanaian cricketer (born 1999)

Personal information
- Born: 13 April 1999 (age 27)
- Batting: Right-handed
- Bowling: Right-arm medium
- Role: All-rounder

International information
- National side: Ghana
- T20I debut (cap 8): 20 May 2019 v Namibia
- Last T20I: 20 March 2024 v Kenya
- Source: Cricinfo, 25 August 2025

Rexford Bakum (born 13 April 1999) is a Ghanaian cricketer. In May 2019, he was named in Ghana's squad for the Regional Finals of the 2018–19 ICC T20 World Cup Africa Qualifier tournament in Uganda. He made his Twenty20 International (T20I) debut against Namibia on 20 May 2019, where he was out for a second-ball duck.
