= Daniel Anefie =

Ghanaian cricketer (born 2000)

Personal information
- Full name: Daniel Kwabena Anefie
- Born: 10 August 2000 (age 26)
- Batting: Right-handed
- Bowling: Right-arm medium
- Role: All-rounder

International information
- National side: Ghana
- T20I debut (cap 3): 20 May 2019 v Namibia
- Last T20I: 17 December 2023 v Sierra Leone
- Source: Cricinfo, 31 August 2025

Daniel Anefie (born 10 August 2000) is a Ghanaian cricketer who has played for the Ghana national team and previously for the Ghana Under-19s. An all-rounder, Anefie is a right-arm medium bowler who bats right handed. In May 2019, he was named in Ghana's squad for the Regional Finals of the 2018–19 ICC T20 World Cup Africa Qualifier tournament in Uganda. He made his Twenty20 International (T20I) debut against Namibia on 20 May 2019.
