= Cameroon national cricket team =

Cricket team representing Cameroon

Cameroon
- Association: Cameroon Cricket Federation

Personnel
- Captain: Faustin Mpegna
- Coach: Atem Divine Baiyee

International Cricket Council
- ICC status: Associate member (2017)
- ICC region: Africa
ICC Rankings	Current	Best-ever
T20I	72nd	72nd (24 May 2026)

International cricket
- First international: v. Lesotho at Accra, Ghana; 25 February 2011

T20 Internationals
- First T20I: v. Mozambique at Gahanga International Cricket Stadium, Kigali; 3 November 2021
- Last T20I: v. Mali at Botswana Cricket Association Oval 1, Gaborone; 29 May 2026
T20Is	Played	Won/Lost
Total	28	6/21 (0 ties, 1 no result)
This year	6	3/3 (0 ties, 0 no results)
T20I kit
- As of 29 May 2026

The Cameroon national cricket team is the men's team that represents Cameroon in international cricket. The team is organised by the Cameroon Cricket Federation, which gained affiliate membership of the International Cricket Council (ICC) on 29 June 2007 and became an associate member in 2017. However, the national side did not make its debut until 2011, when it played in the 2011 Africa Division Three tournament in Ghana.

In April 2018, the ICC decided to grant full Twenty20 International (T20I) status to all its members. Therefore, all Twenty20 matches played between Cameroon and other ICC members since 1 January 2019 have the full T20I status.

== Records and statistics ==
International Match Summary — Cameroon

Last updated 29 May 2026

Playing Record
Format	M	W	L	T	NR	Inaugural Match
Twenty20 Internationals	28	6	21	0	1	3 November 2021

=== Twenty20 International ===
- Highest team total: 146/8 v. Sierra Leone on 2 December 2022 at Gahanga International Cricket Stadium, Kigali.
- Highest individual score: 49, Bruno Toubé v. Sierra Leone on 2 December 2022 at Gahanga International Cricket Stadium, Kigali.
- Best individual bowling figures: 4/13, Alain Toubé v. Eswatini on 8 December 2022 at IPRC Cricket Ground, Kigali.

T20I record versus other nations

Records complete to T20I #3916. Last updated 29 May 2026.

Opponent	M	W	L	T	NR	First match	First win
vs Associate Members
Botswana	2	0	2	0	0	5 November 2021	
Eswatini	1	0	0	0	1	8 December 2022	
Gambia	1	0	1	0	0	9 December 2022	
Ghana	2	0	2	0	0	6 December 2022	
Ivory Coast	1	1	0	0	0	26 May 2026	26 May 2026
Kenya	3	0	3	0	0	19 September 2022	
Lesotho	1	1	0	0	0	26 September 2024	26 September 2024
Malawi	2	0	2	0	0	15 September 2022	
Mali	3	3	0	0	0	7 December 2023	7 December 2023
Mozambique	2	0	2	0	0	3 November 2021	
Nigeria	1	0	1	0	0	5 December 2022	
Rwanda	1	0	1	0	0	23 May 2026	
Sierra Leone	4	1	3	0	0	7 November 2021	24 May 2026
Tanzania	4	0	4	0	0	6 November 2021	

== See also ==
- List of Cameroon Twenty20 International cricketers
