= James Vifah =

Ghanaian cricketer (born 1989)

Personal information
- Full name: James K Vifah
- Born: 24 November 1989 (age 36)
- Batting: Right-handed
- Bowling: Right-arm medium

International information
- National side: Ghana
- T20I debut (cap 13): 21 May 2019 v Kenya
- Last T20I: 20 March 2024 v Kenya
- Source: Cricinfo, 18 August 2025

James Vifah (born 24 November 1989) is a Ghanaian cricketer, who plays for the national team. He was named in Ghana's squad for the 2017 ICC World Cricket League Division Five tournament in South Africa. He played in Ghana's opening fixture, against Germany, on 3 September 2017. Previously, he also played for the Ghana under-19 team.

In May 2019, he was named in Ghana's squad for the Regional Finals of the 2018–19 ICC T20 World Cup Africa Qualifier tournament in Uganda. He made his Twenty20 International (T20I) debut against Kenya on 21 May 2019.
