= Men's T20 World Cup qualification =

ICC Men's T20 World Cup tournament logo

The ICC Men's T20 World Cup, formerly the ICC World Twenty20 (2007–2016), is a biennial world cup for cricket in Twenty20 International (T20I) format, organised by the International Cricket Council (ICC). It was held in every odd year from 2007 to 2009, and since 2010 has been held in every even year with the exception of 2018 and 2020. In 2018, the tournament was rebranded from the World Twenty20 to the T20 World Cup. Until 2016, both men's and women's tournaments were held together; since 2018 both are held separately but in the same calendar year with the exception of 2018 and 2020–2023.

For the inaugural tournament in 2007, ten then full members qualified directly for the tournament along with the top two teams from the 2007 WCL Division One. A separate qualifier event (later renamed "Global Qualifier") for teams advanced from the World Cricket League, was introduced for the 2009 tournament through which top two associates qualified for the World Twenty20 while, all ten full members were given direct qualification. A new expanded pathway was introduced for the 2012 tournament with the introduction of a series of regional qualifiers. All associate nations competed in the regional competitions for a spot in the Global Qualifier from which top associates qualified for the World Twenty20 while, all ten full members were given direct qualification. Same qualification pathway was retained for 2014 and 2016 editions as well.

A new qualification pathway was introduced in 2019 following the rebranding as the T20 World Cup. A stipulated number of top teams from the T20I Rankings directly qualified for the 2021 T20 World Cup, while all other teams competed in two-stage regional qualifiers (sub-regional qualifiers and regional finals) for a spot in the Global Qualifier from which teams advanced to the T20 World Cup. From the 2022 tournament onwards, direct qualification is given to the top teams from the previous tournament and T20I Rankings. The 2022 edition of the Global Qualifier was held as two separate tournaments. Following the T20 World Cup's expansion to 20 teams from the 2024 tournament onwards, the global qualifiers were discontinued with the top eight teams from regional qualifiers qualifying for the T20 World Cup. An expanded Global Qualifier will be reintroduced for the 2028 tournament, in which teams advanced from the regional qualifiers along with the bottom teams from the previous T20 World Cup will compete to determine the final entrants.

As of the 2028 T20 World Cup, 16 different teams have received direct qualification, of which 8 teams have received direct qualification for all 11 tournaments. As of the 2022 Global Qualifier B, a total of 24 teams have competed and six teams have won the tournament, but only two teams have competed in every tournament. As of the 2026 qualification cycle, [...].

== Qualification overview ==
Summary of the qualification for the T20 World Cup (2007–2028) (Note: References for qualification formats: 2007, 2009, 2010, 2012, 2014, 2016, 2021, 2022, 2024, 2026, 2028)
#	Year	Teams	Directly qualified				WCL	Global Qualifier	Regional qualifiers				
#	Year	Teams	Host(s)	Full members	Previous tournament	T20I Rankings	WCL	Global Qualifier	Africa	Americas	Asia	East Asia-Pacific	Europe
1	2007	12	1	9	—N/a		2	—N/a	—N/a				
2	2009	12	1	8	—N/a		—N/a	3	—N/a				
3	2010	12	1	9	—N/a		—N/a	2	—N/a				
4	2012	12	1	9	—N/a		—N/a	2	—N/a				
5	2014	16	1	9	—N/a		—N/a	6	—N/a				
6	2016	16	1	9	—N/a		—N/a	6	—N/a				
7	2021	16	1	—N/a	9		—N/a	6	—N/a				
8	2022	16	1	—N/a	11	—N/a	—N/a	4	—N/a				
9	2024	20	2	—N/a	8	2	—N/a	—N/a	2	1	2	1	2
10	2026	20	2	—N/a	6	4	—N/a	—N/a	2	1	3		2
11	2028	20	2	—N/a	7	3	—N/a	8	—N/a				

=== Global Qualifier ===
Summary of the qualification for Global Qualifier (2008–2028) (Note: References for Global Qualifier qualification formats: 2008, 2010, 2012, 2013, 2015, 2019, 2022 A, 2022 B, 2028)
#	Year	Teams	Directly qualified			WCL	Regional qualifiers				
#	Year	Teams	Host(s)	Previous tournament	T20I Rankings	WCL	Africa	Americas	Asia	East Asia-Pacific	Europe
1	2008	6	—N/a			6	—N/a				
2	2010	8	—N/a			8	—N/a				
3	2012	16	—N/a	—N/a	3	—N/a	3	3	4	1	2
4	2013	16	1	6	—N/a	—N/a	2	2	2	1	2
5	2015	14	2	5	—N/a	—N/a	2	2	1	1	1
6	2019	14	1	—N/a	5	—N/a	3	2	1	1	1
7	2022 A	8	—N/a	2	2	—N/a	0	1	1	1	1
7	2022 B	8	—N/a	2	2	—N/a	1	1	1	0	1
8	2028	16	—N/a	8	—N/a	—N/a	2	1	2	1	2

=== Regional qualifier ===
Until 2016, the regional phase was played in a similar structure as the World Cricket League. Each region had one to three divisions depending on the number of teams in the region. In three-tier regions, teams were divided into three divisions based on their previous performance. Top teams from division 3 advanced to division 2, top teams from division 2 advanced to division 1 and top teams from division 1 advanced to the Global Qualifier. Two-tier regions only had divisions 2 and 1 in a similar format while, single-tier regions only had a division 1 also known as the championship. The ACC Twenty20 Cup functioned as a substitute for the Asian championship. Teams that participated in the T20 World Cup were given byes for regional phase in the following cycle and directly played in the Global Qualifier.

In 2019, the regional phase was expanded to include two sub-stages: sub-regional qualifiers and regional finals. The sub-regional stage has one to three tournaments depending on the region. Top teams from each sub-regional qualifier advance to the respective regional final. Teams that participated in the previous T20 World Cup or Global Qualifier are given byes for the sub-regional stage in the following cycle and directly play in the regional finals. Top teams from each regional final advance to the Global Qualifier (2021–2022; since 2028) or the T20 World Cup (2024–2026). Tournaments are held in either single round-robin or double round-robin format and sometimes includes group stage and/or knockout stage or playoffs formats as well.

== List of qualifiers ==
=== Global Qualifiers ===
Details of Men's T20 World Cup Global Qualifier tournaments
#	Year	Dates	Host(s)	Venues	Ref.
1	2008	2 – 5 August 2008	Cricket Ireland	1 in Ireland	
2	2010	9 – 13 February 2010	Emirates Cricket Board	2 in the United Arab Emirates	
3	2012	13 – 24 March 2012	Emirates Cricket Board	5 in the United Arab Emirates	
4	2013	15 – 30 November 2013	Emirates Cricket Board	6 in the United Arab Emirates	
5	2015	6 – 26 July 2015	Cricket Ireland; Cricket Scotland	4 in Ireland; 4 in Scotland	
6	2019	18 October – 2 November 2019	Emirates Cricket Board	5 in the United Arab Emirates	
7	2022 A	18 – 24 February 2022	Oman Cricket	2 in Oman	
7	2022 B	11 – 17 July 2022	Zimbabwe Cricket	2 in Zimbabwe	
8	2028	TBA	TBA	TBA	

=== Regional qualifiers ===
‡ indicates qualifiers that were cancelled due to the COVID-19 pandemic.

Details of Men's T20 World Cup regional qualifiers
Edition	Dates & locations of regional qualifiers					Ref.
Edition	Africa	Americas	Asia	East-Asia Pacific	Europe	Ref.
2012	Division 3: 24 to 27 February 2011 in Ghana; Division 2: 14 to 18 May 2011 in South Africa; Division 1: 9 to 15 July 2011 in Uganda	Division 3: 14 to 18 March 2011 in Costa Rica; Division 2: 9 to 15 April 2011 in Suriname; Division 1: 17 to 24 July 2011 in United States	ACC T20: 1 to 10 December 2011 in Nepal	Division 2: 4 to 8 April 2011 in Samoa; Division 1: 4 to 7 July 2011 in Papua New Guinea	Division 3: 11 to 14 May 2011 in Slovenia; Division 2: 20 to 25 June 2011 in Belgium & Netherlands; Division 1: 19 to 24 July 2011 in Jersey & Guernsey	
2014	Division 3: 25 to 30 April 2012 in South Africa; Division 2: 1 to 4 October 2012 in South Africa; Division 1: 23 February to 1 March 2013 in Uganda	Division 2: 5 to 9 February 2013 in Bahamas; Division 1: 18 to 24 March 2013 in United States	ACC T20: 26 March to 3 April 2013 in Nepal	Championship: 3 to 7 February 2013 in New Zealand	Division 3: 14 to 16 June 2012 in Estonia; Division 2: 3 to 8 September 2012 in Greece; Division 1: 8 to 14 July 2013 in England	
2016	Division 3: 22 to 25 March 2014 in South Africa; Division 2: 20 to 24 September 2014 in South Africa; Division 1: 27 to 31 March 2015 in South Africa	Division 2: Division 1: 3 to 10 May 2015 in United States	ACC T20: 25 to 30 January 2015 in United Arab Emirates	Championship: 19 to 23 November 2014 in Australia	Division 3: 30 April to 3 May 2014 in Spain; Division 2: 23 to 26 June 2014 in England; Division 1: 9 to 13 May 2015 in Jersey	
2021	Eastern sub-regional: 7 to 14 July 2018 in Rwanda; North-Western sub-regional: 14 to 21 April 2018 in Nigeria; Southern sub-regional: 28 October to 3 November 2018 in Botswana; Regional final: 20 to 24 May 2019 in Uganda	Northern sub-regional: 20 to 26 September 2018 in United States; Southern sub-regional: 26 February to 3 March 2018 in Argentina; Regional final: 18 to 25 August 2019 in Bermuda	Eastern sub-regional: 3 to 12 October 2018 in Malaysia; Western sub-regional: 20 to 26 April 2018 in Kuwait; Regional final: 22 to 28 July 2019 in Singapore	Sub-regional A: 25 to 29 August 2018 in Fiji; Sub-regional B: 1 to 7 December 2018 in Philippines; Regional final: 22 to 24 March 2019 in Papua New Guinea	Sub-regional A: 29 August to 2 September 2018 in Netherlands; Sub-regional B: 29 August to 2 September 2018 in Netherlands; Sub-regional C: 29 August to 2 September 2018 in Netherlands; Regional final: 15 to 20 June 2019 in Guernsey	
2022	Sub-regional A: 16 to 22 October 2021 in Rwanda; Sub-regional B: 2 to 7 November 2021 in Rwanda; Regional final: 17 to 20 November 2021 in Rwanda	Regional final: 7 to 14 November 2021 in Antigua and Barbuda	Sub-regional A: 23 to 29 October 2021 in Qatar; Sub-regional B:‡ 9 to 15 November 2021 in Malaysia	Regional final:‡ 11 to 16 October 2021 in Japan	Sub-regional A:‡ 8 to 13 July 2021 in Finland; Sub-regional B:‡ 24 to 30 June 2021 in Finland; Sub-regional C:‡ 5 to 10 July 2021 in Belgium; Regional final: 15 to 21 October 2021 in Spain	
2024	Sub-regional A: 17 to 25 November 2022 in Rwanda; Sub-regional B: 1 to 9 December 2022 in Rwanda; Regional final: 22 to 30 November 2023 in Namibia	Sub-regional: 25 February to 4 March 2023 in Argentina; Regional final: 30 September to 7 October 2023 in Bermuda	Sub-regional A: 28 September to 5 October 2023 in Qatar; Sub-regional B: 26 July to 1 August 2023 in Malaysia; Regional final: 30 October to 5 November 2023 in Nepal	Sub-regional A: 9 to 15 September 2022 in Vanuatu; Sub-regional B: 15 to 18 October 2022 in Japan; Regional final: 22 to 29 July 2023 in Papua New Guinea	Sub-regional A: 12 to 19 July 2022 in Finland; Sub-regional B: 24 to 31 July 2022 in Finland; Sub-regional C: 28 June to 4 July 2022 in Belgium; Regional final: 20 to 28 July 2023 in Scotland	
2026	Sub-regional A: 21 to 26 September 2024 in Tanzania; Sub-regional B: 19 to 24 October 2024 in Kenya; Sub-regional C: 23 to 28 November 2024 in Nigeria; Regional final: 26 September to 4 October 2025 in Zimbabwe	Sub-regional: 6 to 16 December 2024 in Argentina; Regional final: 15 to 22 June 2025 in Canada	Sub-regional A: 30 August to 9 September 2024 in Malaysia; Sub-regional B: 19 to 28 November 2024 in Qatar	Sub-regional A: 17 to 24 August 2024 in Samoa; Sub-regional B: 28 September to 5 October 2024 in South Korea	Sub-regional A: 9 to 16 June 2024 in Italy; Sub-regional B: 7 to 14 July 2024 in Germany; Sub-regional C: 21 to 28 August 2024 in Guernsey; Regional final: 5 to 11 July 2025 in Netherlands	
2026	Sub-regional A: 21 to 26 September 2024 in Tanzania; Sub-regional B: 19 to 24 October 2024 in Kenya; Sub-regional C: 23 to 28 November 2024 in Nigeria; Regional final: 26 September to 4 October 2025 in Zimbabwe	Sub-regional: 6 to 16 December 2024 in Argentina; Regional final: 15 to 22 June 2025 in Canada	Combined regional final: 1 to 17 October 2025 in Oman		Sub-regional A: 9 to 16 June 2024 in Italy; Sub-regional B: 7 to 14 July 2024 in Germany; Sub-regional C: 21 to 28 August 2024 in Guernsey; Regional final: 5 to 11 July 2025 in Netherlands	
2028	Sub-regional A: 22 May to 1 June 2026 in Botswana; Sub-regional B: 24 to 29 March 2026 in Ghana; Sub-regional C: October 2026 in Nigeria; Regional final: TBA	Sub-regional A: 19 to 28 June 2026 in Bermuda; Sub-regional B: 8 to 15 March 2026 in Cayman Islands; Regional final: TBA	Sub-regional A: TBA; Sub-regional B: TBA; Regional final: TBA	Sub-regional: 8 to 18 May 2026 in Japan; Regional final: TBA	Sub-regional A: 16 to 23 May 2026 in Cyprus; Sub-regional B: 8 to 15 July 2026 in Denmark; Sub-regional C: 14 to 21 August 2026 in Finland; Regional final: TBA	

== Team performances ==
=== Direct qualification ===
Legend

- H Qualified as hosts
- F Qualified as ICC full members
- P Qualified as top teams from previous edition
- R Qualified as top teams from T20I Rankings
- × Withdrew
- ×× Ineligible (suspended)

† denotes current Test playing nations / ICC full members.

Teams qualified through direct qualification
Edition (No. of teams) Team	2007 (10)	2009 (10)	2010 (10)	2012 (10)	2014 (10)	2016 (10)	2021 (10)	2022 (12)	2024 (12)	2026 (12)	2028 (12)	Apps
Afghanistan† (Note: Afghanistan and Ireland became full members in June 2017.)	—N/a	—N/a	—N/a	—N/a	—N/a	—N/a	R	P	R	P	R	5
Australia†	F	F	F	F	F	F	R	H	P	P	H	11
Bangladesh†	F	F	F	F	H	F	R	R	P	× (Note: Bangladesh refused to travel to India to play in the 2026 T20 World Cup and were replaced by Scotland.)	R	10
England†	F	H	F	F	F	F	R	P	P	P	P	11
India†	F	F	F	F	F	H	H	P	P	H	P	11
Ireland†	—N/a	—N/a	—N/a	—N/a	—N/a	—N/a	—N/a	—N/a	—N/a	R	R	2
Namibia	—N/a	—N/a	—N/a	—N/a	—N/a	—N/a	—N/a	P	—N/a	—N/a	—N/a	1
Netherlands	—N/a	—N/a	—N/a	—N/a	—N/a	—N/a	—N/a	—N/a	P	—N/a	—N/a	1
New Zealand†	F	F	F	F	F	F	R	P	P	R	H	11
Pakistan†	F	F	F	F	F	F	R	P	P	R	P	11
Scotland	—N/a	—N/a	—N/a	—N/a	—N/a	—N/a	—N/a	P	—N/a	R	—N/a	1
South Africa†	H	F	F	F	F	F	R	P	P	P	P	11
Sri Lanka†	F	F	F	H	F	F	R	P	P	H	P	11
United States	—N/a	—N/a	—N/a	—N/a	—N/a	—N/a	—N/a	—N/a	H	P	—N/a	2
West Indies†	F	F	H	F	F	F	R	R	H	P	P	11
Zimbabwe†	F	× (Note: Zimbabwe withdrew from the 2009 World Twenty20 due to the political issues related to Robert Mugabe and were replaced by a third team from the Global Qualifier: Scotland.)	F	F	F	F	×× (Note: Zimbabwe was suspended from July to October 2019 by the ICC due to government interference and Nigeria replaced them in the 2019 Global Qualifier.)	—N/a	—N/a	—N/a	P	6
Ref.												

=== Global qualification ===
Legend

- W Winners
- RU Runners-up
- 3rd 3rd place
- 4th 4th place
- R2 Super stage (2010)
- R1 Preliminary round (group stage)
- Q Qualified
- × Withdrew
- ×× Ineligible (suspended)
- * Hosts
- ↑ Advanced to the respective ICC Men's T20 World Cup
- § Directly qualified for the respective ICC Men's T20 World Cup

† denotes current Test playing nations / ICC full members.

Team performances in each Men's T20 World Cup Global Qualifier tournament
Edition (No. of teams)	2008 (6)	2010 (8)	2012 (16)	2013 (16)	2015 (14)	2019 (14)	2022 (A • B) (16)	2028 (16)	Apps
Location(s) Team	(Ireland)	(United Arab Emirates)	(United Arab Emirates)	(United Arab Emirates)	(Ireland) (Scotland)	(United Arab Emirates)	(Oman) (Zimbabwe)	(To be determined)	Apps
Afghanistan†	—N/a	W↑	RU↑	RU↑	R1↑	§	§	§	4
Bahrain	—N/a	—N/a	—N/a	—N/a	—N/a	—N/a	R1		1
Bermuda	R1	—N/a	R1	R1	—N/a	R1	—N/a		4
Canada	R1	R1	R1	R1	R1	R1	R1	Q	7
Denmark	—N/a	—N/a	R1	R1	—N/a	—N/a	—N/a		2
Germany	—N/a	—N/a	—N/a	—N/a	—N/a	—N/a	R1		1
Hong Kong	—N/a	—N/a	R1	R1↑	4th↑	R1	R1		5
Ireland†	W*↑	RU↑	W↑	W↑	3rd*↑	3rd↑	RU↑	§	7
Italy	—N/a	—N/a	R1	R1	—N/a	—N/a	—N/a	Q	2
Jersey	—N/a	—N/a	—N/a	—N/a	R1	R1	R1		3
Kenya	4th	R1	R1	R1	R1	R1	—N/a		6
Namibia	—N/a	—N/a	3rd	R1	R1	4th↑	§	Q	4
Nepal	—N/a	—N/a	R1	3rd↑	R1	—N/a	3rd	Q	4
Netherlands	W↑	R2	4th	R1↑	W↑	W↑	RU↑	Q	7
Nigeria	—N/a	—N/a	—N/a	—N/a	—N/a	R1	—N/a		1
Oman	—N/a	—N/a	R1	—N/a	R1↑	R1↑	4th*	Q	4
Papua New Guinea	—N/a	—N/a	R1	R1	R1	RU↑	3rd		5
Philippines	—N/a	—N/a	—N/a	—N/a	—N/a	—N/a	R1		1
Scotland	3rd↑	R1	R1	R1	W*↑	R1↑	§		6
Singapore	—N/a	—N/a	—N/a	—N/a	—N/a	R1	R1		2
Uganda	—N/a	—N/a	R1	R1	—N/a	—N/a	R1		3
United Arab Emirates	—N/a	R2*	—*	4th*↑	R1	R1*	W↑	Q	5
United States	—N/a	R1	R1	R1	R1	—N/a	4th	Q	5
Zimbabwe†	×	§	§	§	§	××	W*↑	§	1
Ref.									

=== Regional qualification ===
Legend

- D1 Division 1 (2012–2016)
- D2 Division 2 (2012–2016)
- D3 Division 3 (2012–2016)
- RF Regional final (since 2021)
- SR Sub-regional stage (since 2021)
- P Participating in the current qualification cycle (2028)
- × Withdrew
- ×× Ineligible (suspended/expelled)
- * Received bye for the sub-regional stage to regional finals (since 2021)
- ↑ Advanced to the respective ICC Men's T20 World Cup (2024–2026) or ICC Men's T20 World Cup Global Qualifier (2012–2022; since 2028)
- § Directly qualified for the respective ICC Men's T20 World Cup or ICC Men's T20 World Cup Global Qualifier

† denotes current Test playing nations / ICC full members.

==== Africa qualifier ====
Team performances in each Men's T20 World Cup Africa qualifier cycle
Edition (No. of teams) Team	2012 (17)	2014 (17)	2016 (14)	2021 (15)	2022 (15)	2024 (19)	2026 (20)	2028 (20)	Apps
Botswana				RF	SR	SR	RF	SR	8
Cameroon				SR	SR	SR	SR	SR	8
Eswatini	—N/a			SR	SR	SR	SR	SR	8
Gambia				SR	SR	SR	SR	P	8
Ghana				RF	SR	SR	SR	P	8
Ivory Coast	—N/a	—N/a	—N/a	—N/a	—N/a	—N/a	SR	SR	2
Kenya	D1↑	D1↑	D1↑	RF↑	RF*	RF	RF	P	8
Lesotho		—N/a	—N/a	SR	SR	SR	SR	P	6
Malawi		—N/a	—N/a	SR	SR	SR	RF	SR	6
Mali		—N/a	—N/a	—N/a	—N/a	—N/a	—N/a	SR	2
Morocco (Note: Morocco was suspended in 2014 for non-compliant with four of the ICC criteria and was expelled from the ICC in 2019.)			××	××	××	××	××	××	2
Mozambique				SR	SR	SR	SR	P	8
Namibia	D1↑	§	D1↑	RF↑	§	RF*↑	RF*↑	§	7
Nigeria				RF↑	RF*	RF	RF	P	8
Rwanda				SR	SR	RF	SR	P	8
Saint Helena	—N/a		—N/a	SR	—N/a	SR	SR	SR	5
Seychelles				—N/a	SR	SR	SR	SR	7
Sierra Leone				SR	SR	SR	SR	SR	8
Tanzania				SR	RF	RF	RF	P	8
Uganda	D1↑	D1↑	D1↑	RF	RF↑	RF*↑	RF*	P	8
Zambia (Note: Zambia was suspended in 2019 for non-compliant with the ICC's finance statute and was expelled from the ICC in 2021, before being re-admitted in July 2025.)	—N/a		××	××	××	××	××	P	2
Zimbabwe†	§	§	§	××	§	RF*	RF↑	§	1
Ref.	(Note: 2011 Africa qualifier: Division 3; Division 2; Division 1)	(Note: 2012–13 Africa qualifier: Division 3; Division 2; Division 1)	(Note: 2014–15 Africa qualifier: Division 3; Division 2; Division 1)	(Note: 2018–19 Africa qualifier: Eastern sub-regional; North-Western sub-regional; Southern sub-regional; Regional final)	(Note: 2021 Africa qualitfier: Sub-regional A; Sub-regional B; Regional final)	(Note: 2022–23 Africa qualifier: Sub-regional A; Sub-regional B; Regional final)	(Note: 2024–25 Africa qualifier: Sub-regional A; Sub-regional B; Sub-regional C; Regional final)	(Note: 2026–27 Africa qualifier: Sub-regional A; Sub-regional B; Sub-regional C; Regional final)	

==== Americas qualifier ====
Team performances in each Men's T20 World Cup Americas qualifier cycle
Edition (No. of teams) Team	2012 (16)	2014 (9)	2016 (7)	2021 (7)	2022 (7)	2024 (6)	2026 (10)	2028 (11)	Apps
Argentina				SR	RF	SR	SR	SR	8
Bahamas				SR	RF	SR	RF	SR	8
Belize			—N/a	SR	RF	—N/a	SR	SR	6
Bermuda	D1↑	D1↑		RF↑	RF	RF	RF	P	8
Brazil		—N/a	—N/a	—N/a	—N/a	—N/a	SR	SR	3
Canada	D1↑	§	D1↑	RF↑	RF↑	RF*↑	RF*↑	§	7
Cayman Islands				RF	—N/a	RF	RF	P	7
Chile		—N/a	—N/a	—N/a	—N/a	—N/a	—N/a	—N/a	1
Costa Rica		—N/a	—N/a	—N/a	—N/a	—N/a	—N/a	—N/a	1
Falkland Islands		—N/a	—N/a	—N/a	—N/a	—N/a	—N/a	—N/a	1
Mexico		—N/a	—N/a	—N/a	—N/a	—N/a	SR	SR	3
Panama			—N/a	SR	RF	RF	SR	SR	7
Peru		—N/a	—N/a	—N/a	—N/a	—N/a	—N/a	—N/a	1
Suriname				—N/a	—N/a	—N/a	SR	SR	5
Turks and Caicos Islands			—N/a	—N/a	—N/a	—N/a	—N/a	—N/a	2
United States	D1↑	D1↑	D1↑	RF	RF↑	§	§	§	6
Ref.	(Note: 2011 Americas qualifier: Division 3; Division 2; Division 1)	(Note: 2013 Americas qualifier: Division 2; Division 1)	(Note: 2014–15 Americas qualifier: Division 2; Division 1)	(Note: 2018–19 Americas qualifier: Northern sub-regional; Southern sub-regional; Regional final)	(Note: 2021 Americas qualifier: Regional final)	(Note: 2023 Americas qualifier: Sub-regional; Regional final)	(Note: 2024–25 Americas qualifier: Sub-regional; Regional final)	(Note: 2026–27 Americas qualifier: Sub-regional A; Sub-regional B; Regional final)	

==== Asia qualifier ====
Team performances in each Men's T20 World Cup Asia qualifier cycle
Edition (No. of teams) Team	2012 (10)	2014 (10)	2016 (6)	2021 (16)	2022 (15)	2024 (15)	2026 (16)	2028 (15)	Apps
Afghanistan†	D1↑	§	§	§	§	§	§	§	1
Bahrain	—N/a		—N/a	SR	GQ	RF*	SR	P	6
Bhutan		—N/a	—N/a	SR	SR	SR	SR	SR	6
Cambodia	—N/a	—N/a	—N/a	—N/a	—N/a	—N/a	SR	—N/a	1
China	—N/a	—N/a	—N/a	—N/a	SR	SR	SR	SR	4
Hong Kong	D1↑	§	§	§	RF↑	RF*	SR	P	5
Kuwait				RF	SR	RF	RF	P	8
Malaysia				SR	SR	RF	RF	P	8
Maldives				SR	SR	SR	SR	P	8
Mongolia	—N/a	—N/a	—N/a	—N/a	—N/a	—N/a	SR	SR	2
Myanmar	—N/a	—N/a	—N/a	RF	SR	SR	SR	SR	5
Nepal	D1↑	§	§	RF	§	RF*↑	RF*↑	§	4
Oman	D1↑		D1↑	§	§	RF*↑	RF*↑	§	5
Qatar	—N/a	—N/a	—N/a	RF	SR	SR	RF	P	5
Saudi Arabia		—N/a		SR	SR	SR	SR	P	7
Singapore	—N/a			RF↑	§	RF*	SR	P	6
Thailand	—N/a	—N/a	—N/a	SR	SR	SR	SR	SR	5
United Arab Emirates		§	§	RF↑	§	RF*	RF↑	§	4
Ref.	(Note: 2011 Asia qualifier: ACC T20)	(Note: 2013 Asia qualifier: ACC T20)	(Note: 2015 Asia qualifier: ACC T20)	(Note: 2018–19 Asia qualifier: Eastern sub-regional; Western sub-regional; Regional final)	(Note: 2021 Asia qualifier: Sub-regional A; Sub-regional B)	(Note: 2023 Asia qualifier: Sub-regional A; Sub-regional B; Regional final)	(Note: 2024–25 Asia qualifier: Sub-regional A; Sub-regional B; Combined regional final)	(Note: 2026–27 Asia qualifier: Sub-regional A; Sub-regional B; Regional final)	

==== East Asia-Pacific qualifier ====
Team performances in each Men's T20 World Cup EAP qualifier cycle
Edition (No. of teams) Team	2012 (10)	2014 (7)	2016 (8)	2021 (8)	2022 (9)	2024 (9)	2026 (9)	2028 (9)	Apps
Cook Islands				SR	RF	SR	SR	P	8
Fiji				SR	RF	SR	SR	SR	8
Indonesia				SR	RF	SR	SR	SR	8
Japan				SR	RF	RF	RF	P	8
Papua New Guinea	D1↑	§	D1↑	RF↑	§	RF*↑	RF*	P	6
Philippines		—N/a		RF	RF↑	RF*	SR	SR	7
Samoa				SR	RF	SR	RF	P	8
South Korea		—N/a	—N/a	SR	RF	SR	SR	SR	6
Tonga (Note: Tonga was suspended in 2013 for not having a full-time administrator and was expelled from the ICC in 2014.)		××	××	××	××	××	××	××	1
Vanuatu				RF	RF	RF	SR	SR	8
Ref.	(Note: 2011 EAP qualifier: Division 2; Division 1)	(Note: 2013 EAP qualifier: Championship)	(Note: 2014 EAP qualifier: Championship)	(Note: 2018–19 EAP qualifier: Sub-regional A; Sub-regional B; Regional final)	(Note: 2021 EAP qualifier: Regional final)	(Note: 2022–23 EAP qualifier: Sub-regional A; Sub-regional B; Regional final)	(Note: 2024–25 EAP qualifier: Sub-regional A; Sub-regional B; Combined regional final)	(Note: 2026–27 EAP qualifier: Sub-regional; Regional final)	

==== Europe qualifier ====
Team performances in each Men's T20 World Cup Europe qualifier cycle
Edition (No. of teams) Team	2012 (26)	2014 (24)	2016 (11)	2021 (21)	2022 (26)	2024 (32)	2026 (32)	2028 (32)	Apps
Austria				SR	SR	RF	SR	SR	8
Belgium				SR	SR	SR	SR	SR	8
Bulgaria			—N/a	—N/a	SR	SR	SR	SR	6
Croatia			—N/a	—N/a	—N/a	SR	SR	SR	5
Cyprus			—N/a	SR	SR	SR	SR	SR	7
Czech Republic		—N/a	—N/a	SR	SR	SR	SR	SR	6
Denmark	D1↑	D1↑		RF	RF	RF	SR	P	8
Estonia			—N/a	—N/a	—N/a	SR	SR	SR	5
Finland				SR	SR	SR	SR	SR	8
France				SR	SR	SR	SR	SR	8
Germany	—N/a			RF	RF↑	RF	SR	SR	7
Gibraltar				SR	SR	SR	SR	SR	8
Greece				—N/a	SR	SR	SR	SR	7
Guernsey				RF	SR	SR	RF	P	8
Hungary	—N/a	—N/a	—N/a	—N/a	SR	SR	SR	SR	4
Ireland†	§	§	§	§	§	RF*↑	§	§	1
Isle of Man				SR	SR	SR	SR	SR	8
Israel				SR	SR	SR	SR	SR	8
Italy	D1↑	D1↑		RF	RF	RF	RF↑	§	8
Jersey			D1↑	RF↑	RF↑	RF	RF	P	8
Luxembourg			—N/a	—N/a	SR	SR	SR	SR	6
Malta			—N/a	—N/a	SR	SR	SR	SR	6
Norway				RF	SR	SR	SR	SR	8
Netherlands	§	§	§	§	§	§	RF*↑	§	1
Portugal			—N/a	—N/a	SR	SR	SR	P	6
Romania	—N/a	—N/a	—N/a	—N/a	SR	SR	SR	SR	4
Serbia	—N/a	—N/a	—N/a	—N/a	SR	SR	SR	SR	4
Slovenia			—N/a	—N/a	—N/a	SR	SR	SR	5
Spain				SR	SR	SR	SR	P	8
Sweden			—N/a	SR	SR	SR	SR	SR	7
Switzerland	—N/a	—N/a	—N/a	—N/a	—N/a	SR	SR	SR	3
Scotland	§	§	§	§	§	RF*↑	RF* / §	P*	3
Turkey		—N/a	—N/a	—N/a	—N/a	SR	SR	SR	4
Ref.	(Note: 2011 Europe qualifier: Division 3; Division 2; Division 1)	(Note: 2012–13 Europe qualifier: Division 3; Division 2; Division 1)	(Note: 2014–15 Europe qualifier: Division 3; Division 2; Division 1)	(Note: 2018–19 Europe qualifier: Sub-regional A; Sub-regional B; Sub-regional C; Regional final)	(Note: 2021 Europe qualifier: Sub-regional A; Sub-regional B; Sub-regional C; Regional final)	(Note: 2022–23 Europe qualifier: Sub-regional A; Sub-regional B; Sub-regional C; Regional final)	(Note: 2024–25 Europe qualifier: Sub-regional A; Sub-regional B; Sub-regional C; Regional final)	(Note: 2026–27 Europe qualifier: Sub-regional A; Sub-regional B; Sub-regional C; Regional final)	

== See also ==
- Women's T20 World Cup
- Women's T20 World Cup Global Qualifier
