= 2012 Africa Twenty20 Division Three =

2012 ICC World Cricket League Africa Region Twenty20 Division Three
- Administrator(s): International Cricket Council
- Cricket format: Twenty20
- Tournament format(s): Round-robin
- Host(s): South Africa
- Champions: Zambia
- Participants: 8
- Matches: 32
- Official website: ICC Africa Region

The 2012 ICC World Cricket League Africa Region Twenty20 Division Three Is a cricket tournament that took place between 25 and 30 April 2012. South Africa hosted the event, with Zambia winning it.

== Teams ==
Teams that participated are as follows:

- Cameroon
- Rwanda
- Gambia
- Morocco
- Mali
- Seychelles
- Zambia
- Saint Helena

== Squads ==
Cameroon	Gambia	Mali	Morocco
Solefack James (c); Ondoa Bertran; Nyoma Bienvenue; Nseke Bruno; Fouta Dorian; Ngameni Frank; Mpegna Faustin Jr.; Abada Gildas; Tchakou Idris; Ndum Mukum; Teunga Nasser; Abanda Protais; Ngueudam Raoul; Sunjo Sylverus	Prince Johnson (c); Moses Bahoum; Mohammed Camara; Peter Campbull; Kunal Chotrani; Aniru Conteh; Mbye Dumbuya; George Greywood; Andre Jarju; Abdoulie Johnson; Gabriel Njie; Ismaila Tamba; Atish Yadav; Melville Williams	Ichakha Fofana (c); Mahamadou Diaby; Saibou Diallo; Drissa Fadiga; Amadou Kane; Ibrahima Keita; Mamadou Keita; Habibou N'diaye; Joel Sagara; Djery Samoura; Salif Sissoko; Amadou Traore; Mohamed Toure; Massiré Waggue	Rachid Ouboukis (c); Brahim Bekkouri; Abdelghani Ennaoui; Soufiane Es-Sih; Mohamed Essousy; Ismail Kettani; Anass Lakhrissi; Mountassir Lakhrissi; Adil Lamkhayar; Mohcine Lkouede; Salah Mouridi; Mohamed Nakrou; Mustapha Olahian; Zakaria Zaki
Rwanda	Saint Helena	Seychelles	Zambia
Eric Dusingizimana (c); Derrick Bayingana; Audifax Byiringiro; Eric Dusabemungu; Theogene Gatera; Asif Kanunga; Andre Kayitera; Desire Manirambona; Julius Mbaraga; Don Mugisha; Evode Mutuyimana; Freddy Ndayisenga; Bob Songa; Srinath Vardhineni	Dax Richards (c); Greg Coleman; Scott Crowie; Jamie Essex; David George; Gavin George; Ross Henry; Gareth Johnson; Dane Leo; Tricillian Moyce; Damien O'Bey; Phillip Stroud; Anthony Thomas; Andrew Yon	Kaushalkumar Patel (c); Arvind Bhuva; Govindbhai Bhuva; Pradeep Dewage; Muditha Gunatilake; Sohan Halpe; Dharmesh Hirani; Tim Horpinitch; Harikrishnan Kamalan; Janaka Ratnayake; Tharmenthiran Shanmugam; Dhiraj Varsani; Mukesh Vadodariya; Suranga Wattalage	Sarfraz Patel (c); Steven Banda; Irfan Galiya; Leonard Kabasa; Gladson Kandela; Godfrey Kandela; Imran Mohamed; Nicholas Mubanga; Isaac Mwaba; Allan Nsensha; Tapson Nyirongo; Abid Patel; Himal Patel; Sharif Yousuf

== Fixtures ==
=== Group stage ===
==== Points Table ====
Team	P	W	L	T	NR	Points	NRR
Zambia	7	7	0	0	0	14	+3.9523
Seychelles	7	6	1	0	0	12	+0.420
Rwanda	7	4	3	0	0	8	+0.783
Gambia	7	4	3	0	0	8	-0.021
Saint Helena	7	3	4	0	0	6	+0.945
Morocco	7	2	5	0	0	4	-0.093
Cameroon	7	2	5	0	0	4	-2.343
Mali	7	0	7	0	0	0	-3.437

Teams that qualified for 2012 Africa Division Two

==== Matches ====
25 April
11:00 AM
Scorecard

Cameroon; 36 (11.2 overs)	v	Saint Helena; 37/1 (6.1 overs)
Abada Gildas 7 Greg Coleman 5/8 (4 overs)		Dax Richards 15*; Sunjo Sylverus 1/10 (3.1 overs)

Saint Helena won by 9 wickets
Willowmoore Park, Benoni
Umpires: V Angara and W Dollar

- Saint Helena won the toss and elected to field

25 April
11:00 AM
Scorecard

Seychelles; 122/6 (20 overs)	v	Gambia; 90
Janaka Ratnayake 24 (46); Aniru Conteh 4/23		Moses Bahoum 25 (23); Kaushalkumar Patel 3/12

Seychelles won by 32 runs
Willowmoore Park, Benoni

- Seychelles won the toss and elected to bat

25 April
11:00 AM
Scorecard

Rwanda; 109/3 (18 overs)	v	Mali; 62/6 (18 overs)
Eric Dusingizimana 41 (55)		Derrick Bayingana 4/3

Rwanda won by 47 runs
Willowmoore Park, Benoni

- Mali won the toss and elected to field

25 April
11:00 AM
Scorecard

Morocco; 75/6 (20 overs)	v	Zambia; 77/4 (13.2 overs)
Abdelghani Ennaoui 17*; Imran Mohamed 3/12		Sarfraz Patel 21; Mohcine Lkouede 2/14

Zambia won by 6 wickets
Willowmoore Park, Benoni

- Zambia won the toss and elected to field

25 April
4:00 PM
Scorecard

Seychelles; 71	v	Cameroon; 62 (19.3 overs)
		Abada Gildas 21; Mukesh Vadodariya 2/5

Seychelles won 9 runs
Willowmoore Park, Benoni

- Cameroon won the toss and elected to field

25 April
4:00 PM
Scorecard

Gambia; 122/8 (20 overs)	v	Rwanda; 110/6 (20 overs)
Atish Yadav 64*; Asif Kanunga 3/14 (4 overs)		Andre Kayitera 42; Aniru Conteh 3/18 (4 overs)

Gambia won 12 runs
Willowmoore Park, Benoni
Umpires: V Angara and W Dollar

- Gambia won the toss and elected to bat

25 April
4:00 PM
Scorecard

Morocco; 100	v	Mali; 76
Anass Lakhrissi 26; Salif Sessoko 3/24		Mountassir Lakhrissi 3/13

Morocco won by 24 runs
Willowmoore Park, Benoni

- Mali won the toss and elected to field

25 April
4:00 PM
Scorecard

Zambia; 108	v	Saint Helena; 71
Sarfraz Patel 24; David George 3/23		Scott Crowie 15; Imran Mohamed 3/22

Zambia won by 37 runs
Willowmoore Park, Benoni

- Saint Helena won the toss and elected to field

26 April
11:00 AM
Scorecard

Rwanda; 190/2 (20 overs)	v	Cameroon; 86
Andre Kayitera 64 (50)		Eric Dusabemungu 3/10

Rwanda won by 104 runs
Willowmoore Park, Benoni

- Cameroon won the toss and elected to field

26 April
11:00 AM
Scorecard

Gambia; 119/7 (20 overs)	v	Morocco; 84
Atish Yadav 44 (50); Ismail Kettani 2/15 (4 overs)

Gambia won by 35 runs
Willowmoore Park, Benoni
Umpires: V Angara and Nasir Ahmed

- Morocco won the toss and elected to field

26 April
11:00 AM
Scorecard

Saint Helena; 170/7 (20 overs)	v	Mali; 52
Dax Richards 57 (49)		Andrew Yon 4/12

Saint Helena won by 118 runs
Willowmoore Park, Benoni

- Saint Helena won the toss and elected to bat

26 April
11:00 AM
Scorecard

Zambia; 158/6 (20 overs)	v	Seychelles; 81 (19.4 overs)
Irfan Galiya 74; Sohan Halpe 3/15 (3 overs)		Sohan Halpe 26; Godfrey Kandela 3/3 (1.4 overs)

Zambia won by 77 runs
Willowmoore Park, Benoni

- Zambia won the toss and elected to bat

26 April
4:00 PM
Scorecard

Gambia; 142/9 (20 overs)	v	Cameroon; 108
Gabriel Njie 30 (21); Ngueudam Raoul 3/20

Gambia won by 34 runs
Willowmoore Park, Benoni

- Cameroon won the toss and elected to field

26 April
4:00 PM
Scorecard

Morocco; 134/7 (20 overs)	v	Rwanda; 135/9 (20 overs)
Zakaria Zaki 48; Bob Songa 2/13 (2 overs)		Eric Dusabemungu 39; Abdelghani Ennaoui 2/17 (4 overs)

Rwanda won by 1 wicket
Willowmoore Park, Benoni
Umpires: D Simelane and L Mayunga

- Morocco won the toss and elected to bat

26 April
4:00 PM
Scorecard

Seychelles; 128	v	Saint Helena; 128
Arvind Bhuva 45 (38); Gareth Johnson 3/15

Seychelles won in the Super Over
Willowmoore Park, Benoni

- Seychelles won the toss and elected to bat

26 April
4:00 PM
Scorecard

Zambia; 147/6	v	Mali; 29
Abid Patel 28 (29); Salif Sissoko 3/25		Imran Mohamed 6/14

Zambia won by 118 runs
Willowmoore Park, Benoni

- Zambia won the toss and elected to bat

27 April
4:00 PM
Scorecard

Mali; 91/8 (20 overs)	v	Cameroon; 92/7 (15.2 overs)
Habibou N'diaye 31; Nyoma Bienvenue 2/10 (4 overs)		Fouta Dorian 20*; Salif Sissoko 2/21 (4 overs)

Cameroon won by 3 wickets
Willowmoore Park, Benoni
Umpires: J Bedford and Nasir Ahmed

- Cameroon won the toss and elected to field

27 April
4:00 PM
Scorecard

Saint Helena; 139/5 (20 overs)	v	Gambia; 129/9 (20 overs)
Gavin George 48 (37)		Melville Williams 29 (24); Scott Crowie 4/17

Saint Helena won by 10 runs
Willowmoore Park, Benoni

- Saint Helena won the toss and elected to bat

27 April
4:00 PM
Scorecard

Morocco; 101	v	Seychelles; 102/7
Mohcine Lkouede 28; Mukesh Vadodaraya 5/18		Tim Horpinitch 42 (49)

Seychelles won by 3 wickets
Willowmoore Park, Benoni

- Morocco won the toss and elected to bat

27 April
4:00 PM
Scorecard

Rwanda; 75	v	Zambia; 78/1
Gladson Kandela 4/17		Allan Nsensha 51 (52)

Zambia won by 9 wickets
Willowmoore Park, Benoni

- Zambia won the toss and elected to field

28 April
11:00 AM
Scorecard

Gambia; 156/6 (20 overs)	v	Mali; 100/9 (20 overs)
Atish Yadav 59; Mamadou Keita 4/24 (4 overs)		Massiré Waggue 21; Mbye Dumbuya 3/16 (4 overs)

Gambia won by 56 runs
Willowmoore Park, Benoni
Umpires: D Simelane and Nasir Ahmed

- Gambia won the toss and elected to bat

28 April
11:00 AM
Scorecard

Seychelles; 154/6 (20 overs)	v	Rwanda; 124/6 (20 overs)
Tim Horpinitch 59 (49); Asif Kanunga 2/22		Don Mugisha 40 (47); Sohan Halpe 2/20

Seychelles won by 30 runs
Willowmoore Park, Benoni

- Seychelles won the toss and elected to bat

28 April
11:00 AM
Scorecard

Morocco; 123/7 (20 overs)	v	Saint Helena; 83 (17.4 overs)
Mouridi Salah 29 (25); Phillip Stroud 3/16		Mountassir Lakhrissi 2/7

Morocco won by 40 runs
Willowmoore Park, Benoni

- Morocco won the toss and elected to bat

28 April
11:00 AM
Scorecard

Zambia; 170/3 (20 overs)	v	Cameroon; 58
Allan Nsensha 66		Nicholas Mubanga 4/11

Zambia won by 112 runs
Willowmoore Park, Benoni

- Cameroon won the toss and elected to field

28 April
4:00 PM
Scorecard

Morocco; 126/8 (20 overs)	v	Cameroon; 128/2
Abdelghani Ennaoui 48 (29); Ngueudam Raoul 3/17		Teunga Nasser 82 (48)

Cameroon won by 8 wickets
Willowmoore Park, Benoni

- Morocco won the toss and elected to bat

28 April
4:00 PM
Scorecard

Mali; 78	v	Seychelles; 79/0 (9 overs)
Salif Sissoko 26 (35); Dhiraj Varsani 2/6		Janaka Ratnayake 44*

Seychelles won by 10 wickets
Willowmoore Park, Benoni

- Mali won the toss and elected to bat

28 April
4:00 PM
Scorecard

Rwanda; 114/9 (20 overs)	v	Saint Helena; 113/6 (20 overs)
Andre Kayitera 53; Gareth Johnson 3/15		Dax Richards 38; Srinath Vardhineni 2/13

Rwanda won by 1 run
Willowmoore Park, Benoni

- Rwanda won the toss and elected to bat

28 April
4:00 PM
Scorecard

Zambia; 185/7 (20 overs)	v	Gambia; 87
Allan Nsensha 71 (57); Aniru Conteh 3/31 (4 overs)

Zambia won by 98 runs
Willowmoore Park, Benoni

- Zambia won the toss and elected to bat

=== Play-offs ===
==== 7th place play-off ====
29 April
11.00 a.m.
Scorecard

Mali; 43	v	Cameroon; 47/3
Fouta Dorian 3/6		Ngameni Frank 19

Cameroon won by 7 wickets
Willowmoore Park, Benoni

- Cameroon won the toss and elected to field.

==== 5th place play-off ====
29 April
11.00 a.m.
Scorecard

Saint Helena; 127/7 (20 overs)	v	Morocco; 100
Dax Richards 33; Brahim Bekkouri 3/24		Phillip Stroud 2/13

Saint Helena won by 27 runs
Willowmoore Park, Benoni

- Saint Helena won the toss and elected to bat.

==== 3rd place play-off ====
29 April
11.00 a.m.
Scorecard

Gambia; 125/6 (20 overs)	v	Rwanda; 121/8 (20 overs)
Gabriel Njie 43 (41); Eric Dusabemungu 3/20		Eric Dusingizimana 42 (46)

Gambia won by 4 runs
Willowmoore Park, Benoni

- Gambia won the toss and elected to bat.

==== Final ====
29 April
11.00 a.m.
Scorecard

Seychelles; 102	v	Zambia; 103/5 (15.5 overs)
Tim Horpinitch 29; Himal Patel 5/7		Allan Nsesha 33; Sohan Halpe 2/13

Zambia won by 5 wickets.
Willowmoore Park, Benoni

- Seychelles won the toss and elected to bat.

== Final Placings ==
After the conclusion of the tournament the teams were distributed as follows:

Pos	Team	Promotion/Relegation
1st	Zambia	Promoted to 2012 Africa Division Two
2nd	Seychelles	Promoted to 2012 Africa Division Two
3rd	Gambia	Remain in 2015 Africa Division Three
4th	Rwanda	Remain in 2015 Africa Division Three
5th	Saint Helena	Remain in 2015 Africa Division Three
6th	Morocco	Remain in 2015 Africa Division Three
7th	Cameroon	Remain in 2015 Africa Division Three
8th	Mali	Remain in 2015 Africa Division Three

== See also ==
- 2012 ICC World Twenty20 Qualifier
- World Cricket League Africa Region
