= 2026 Men's T20 World Cup qualification =

2026 ICC Men's T20 World Cup qualification
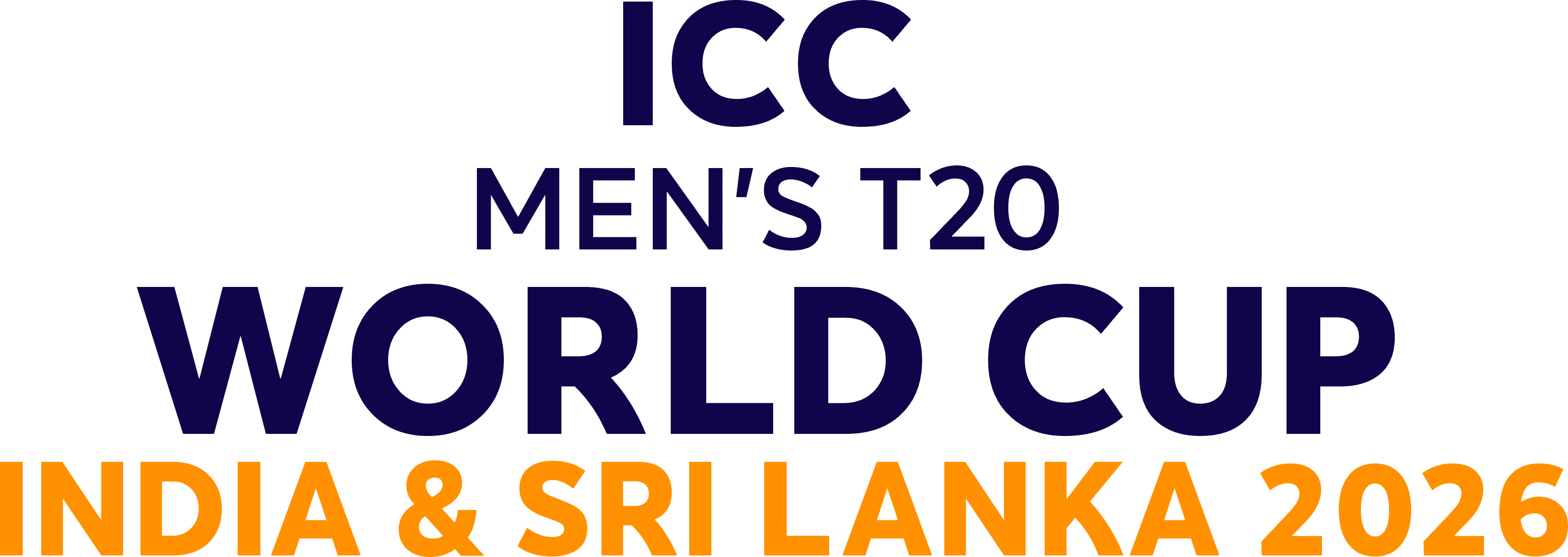
- 2026 ICC Men's T20 World Cup tournament logo
- Dates: 9 June 2024 – 17 October 2025
- Administrators: International Cricket Council; Africa Cricket Association; Asian Cricket Council; ICC Americas; ICC East Asia-Pacific; ICC Europe
- Cricket format: Twenty20 International
- Host: Various
- Participants: 12 (direct qualification); 87 (regional qualification)
- Matches: 292
- Most runs: (United Arab Emirates) Alishan Sharafu (508)
- Most wickets: (The Bahamas) Festus Benn (22)

The 2026 ICC Men's T20 World Cup was the tenth edition of the ICC Men's T20 World Cup, a biennial world cup for cricket in Twenty20 International (T20I) format organised by the International Cricket Council (ICC). It was co-hosted by the Board of Control for Cricket in India and Sri Lanka Cricket from 7 February to 8 March 2026. Sri Lanka had previously hosted the competition in 2012 and India in 2016. The qualification process for the 2026 tournament included two stages: 12 teams were awarded direct qualification while 87 teams took part in the regional qualification to compete for the remaining 8 spots. The regional qualification included a series of sub-regional qualifiers and regional finals held between June 2024 and October 2025.

India and Sri Lanka, the host teams, along with the top seven teams from the 2024 tournament – Afghanistan, Australia, Bangladesh, England, South Africa, the United States and the West Indies – directly qualified for the 2026 tournament. The remaining three direct qualification places were allocated to the next best-ranked teams in the ICC Men's T20I Team Rankings as on 30 June 2024 that had not finished in the top seven: Ireland, New Zealand and Pakistan. The eight remaining places were filled through the ICC's regional qualifiers: Canada from the Americas; Italy and Netherlands from Europe; Namibia and Zimbabwe from Africa; and Nepal, Oman and the United Arab Emirates from the combined Asia–EAP final. Italy qualified for the men's T20 World Cup for the first time. Ahead of the tournament itself, Bangladesh withdrew from the tournament and were replaced by the next best ranked team in the T20I Rankings: Scotland.

== Format ==
The top eight teams from the previous edition, along with the 2026 hosts and the next best two to four teams (depending on the finishing positions of the hosts in the previous edition) from the ICC Men's T20I Team Rankings, qualified directly for the tournament. The remaining eight teams were decided by regional qualifiers. Each regional qualifier was held in two stages:

- Sub-regional qualifiers: This stage comprised one or more tournaments depending on the ICC region. Matches were held in either single round-robin or double round-robin formats and sometimes included group stages and knockout stages or playoff formats as well. The stipulated number of teams advanced into the next stage.
- Regional final: Top teams unable to earn direct qualification along with teams advancing from the sub-regional qualifiers took part in this stage. Matches were held in either single round-robin or double round-robin formats and sometimes included group stages and knockout stages or playoff formats as well. The stipulated number of teams advanced to the 2026 T20 World Cup.

Summary of the qualification process
ICC region	Slots per region	No. of directly qualified teams	Remaining slots	Regional qualifiers		
ICC region	Slots per region	No. of directly qualified teams	Remaining slots	No. of participants	Start date	End date
Africa	3	1	2	20	21 September 2024	4 October 2025
Americas	3	2	1	10	6 December 2024	22 June 2025
Asia East Asia-Pacific	8(9) (Note: Bangladesh had initially qualified for the tournament, but following the Board of Control for Cricket in India's decision to exclude Bangladeshi players from the 2026 Indian Premier League in January 2026 as a response to the anti-Hindu violence in Bangladesh during 2025 and the lynching of Dipu Chandra Das in December 2025, the Bangladesh Cricket Board (BCB) requested that Bangladesh's matches at the World Cup be moved from India. The International Cricket Council however rejected the BCB's request and Bangladesh withdrew from the tournament. They were replaced by the next highest ranked team in the T20I Rankings: Scotland.)	3(4) 2	3	16 9	30 August 2024 17 August 2024	17 October 2025
Europe	6(5)	4(3)	2	32	9 June 2024	11 July 2025
Total	20	12	8	87		

== Qualified teams ==
Highlighted are the countries that participated in the 2026 Men's T20 World Cup qualification pathway. Qualified directly (hosts, top 6 from the previous tournament, or via T20I Rankings) Qualified via the regional qualifiers Participated in the regional qualifiers but failed to qualify Withdrew or suspended

Details of the teams qualified for the T20 World Cup
Team	Method of qualification	Date of qualification	Venue(s)	Number of teams	Total times qualified	Last time qualified	Previous best performance
India	Hosts	16 November 2021	—N/a	2	10	2024	Winners (2007, 2024)
Sri Lanka	Hosts	16 November 2021	—N/a	2	10	2024	Winners (2014)
Afghanistan	2024 Men's T20 World Cup (Top teams from the previous tournament, excluding hosts)	17 June 2024	West Indies United States	6(7)	8	2024	Semi-finals (2024)
Australia	2024 Men's T20 World Cup (Top teams from the previous tournament, excluding hosts)	17 June 2024	West Indies United States	6(7)	10	2024	Winners (2021)
~~Bangladesh~~	2024 Men's T20 World Cup (Top teams from the previous tournament, excluding hosts)	17 June 2024	West Indies United States	6(7)	9	2024	Super 8 (2007, 2024)
England	2024 Men's T20 World Cup (Top teams from the previous tournament, excluding hosts)	17 June 2024	West Indies United States	6(7)	10	2024	Winners (2010, 2022)
South Africa	2024 Men's T20 World Cup (Top teams from the previous tournament, excluding hosts)	17 June 2024	West Indies United States	6(7)	10	2024	Runners-up (2024)
United States	2024 Men's T20 World Cup (Top teams from the previous tournament, excluding hosts)	17 June 2024	West Indies United States	6(7)	2	2024	Super 8 (2024)
West Indies	2024 Men's T20 World Cup (Top teams from the previous tournament, excluding hosts)	17 June 2024	West Indies United States	6(7)	10	2024	Winners (2012, 2016)
Ireland	ICC Men's T20I Team Rankings	30 June 2024	—N/a	3	9	2024	Super 8 (2009)
New Zealand	ICC Men's T20I Team Rankings	30 June 2024	—N/a	3	10	2024	Runners-up (2021)
Pakistan	ICC Men's T20I Team Rankings	30 June 2024	—N/a	3	10	2024	Winners (2009)
Canada	Americas Qualifier	15 – 22 June 2025	Canada	1	2	2024	Group stage (2024)
Italy	Europe Qualifier	5 – 11 July 2025	Netherlands	2	1	—N/a	—
Netherlands	Europe Qualifier	5 – 11 July 2025	Netherlands	2	7	2024	Super 12 (2022)
Namibia	Africa Qualifier	26 September – 4 October 2025	Zimbabwe	2	4	2024	Super 12 (2021)
Zimbabwe	Africa Qualifier	26 September – 4 October 2025	Zimbabwe	2	7	2022	Super 12 (2022)
Nepal	Asia–EAP Qualifier	8 – 17 October 2025	Oman	3	3	2024	Group stage (2014, 2024)
Oman	Asia–EAP Qualifier	8 – 17 October 2025	Oman	3	4	2024	Group stage (2016, 2021, 2024)
United Arab Emirates	Asia–EAP Qualifier	8 – 17 October 2025	Oman	3	3	2022	Group stage (2014, 2022)
Scotland	ICC Men's T20I Team Rankings (Replacement for Bangladesh)	21 January 2026	—N/a	1	7	2024	Super 12 (2021)
Total				20			

== Africa qualifier ==
The qualification stages were as follows:

- Qualifier A: Six teams played in round-robin format for 15 matches from 21 to 26 September 2024 in Tanzania.
- Qualifier B: Six teams played in round-robin format for 15 matches from 19 to 24 October 2024 in Kenya.
- Qualifier C: Six teams played in round-robin format for 15 matches from 23 to 28 November 2024 in Nigeria.
- Regional final: Eight teams divided into two groups of four played in round-robin format followed by playoffs for a total of 20 matches from 26 September to 4 October 2025 in Zimbabwe.

=== Africa sub-regional qualifiers ===
The sub-regional qualifiers were hosted by the Tanzania Cricket Association, Cricket Kenya and the Nigeria Cricket Federation. The top two sides of each sub-regional qualifier (Malawi and Tanzania from qualifier A, Kenya and Zimbabwe from qualifier B and Botswana and Nigeria from qualifier C) advanced to the regional final.

==== Africa qualifier A ====
Qualifier A standings
Pos	Team	Pld	W	L	NR	Pts	NRR	Qualification
1	Tanzania (H)	5	5	0	0	10	4.774	Advanced to the regional final
2	Malawi	5	4	1	0	8	3.241	Advanced to the regional final
3	Ghana	5	3	2	0	6	1.575	Eliminated
4	Cameroon	5	2	3	0	4	−1.191	Eliminated
5	Lesotho	5	1	4	0	2	−2.283	Eliminated
6	Mali	5	0	5	0	0	−6.637	Eliminated

Source: ESPNcricinfo
(H) Host

==== Africa qualifier B ====
Qualifier B standings
Pos	Team	Pld	W	L	NR	Pts	NRR	Qualification
1	Zimbabwe	5	5	0	0	10	8.893	Advanced to the regional final
2	Kenya (H)	5	4	1	0	8	3.108	Advanced to the regional final
3	Mozambique	5	3	2	0	6	−1.259	Eliminated
4	Rwanda	5	2	3	0	4	−1.853	Eliminated
5	Seychelles	5	1	4	0	2	−4.425	Eliminated
6	Gambia	5	0	5	0	0	−7.219	Eliminated

Source: ESPNcricinfo
(H) Host

==== Africa qualifier C ====
Qualifier C standings
Pos	Team	Pld	W	L	NR	Pts	NRR	Qualification
1	Nigeria (H)	5	5	0	0	10	5.372	Advanced to the regional final
2	Botswana	5	4	1	0	8	1.796	Advanced to the regional final
3	Sierra Leone	5	3	2	0	6	2.474	Eliminated
4	Eswatini	5	2	3	0	4	−0.337	Eliminated
5	Saint Helena	5	1	4	0	2	−1.369	Eliminated
6	Ivory Coast	5	0	5	0	0	−10.698	Eliminated

Source: ESPNcricinfo
(H) Host

=== Africa regional final ===
Namibia and Uganda directly qualified for the regional final after receiving a bye due to their participation in the 2024 T20 World Cup. The regional final was hosted by the Zimbabwe Cricket. The top two sides of the regional final (Namibia and Zimbabwe) qualified for the 2026 T20 World Cup.

Group stage

Group A standings
Pos	Team	Pld	W	L	NR	Pts	NRR	Qualification
1	Namibia	3	3	0	0	6	6.556	Advanced to the semi-final
2	Kenya	3	1	2	0	2	−1.553	Advanced to the semi-final
3	Nigeria	3	1	2	0	2	−1.822	Advanced to the play-offs
4	Malawi	3	1	2	0	2	−2.613	Advanced to the play-offs

Source: ESPNcricinfo

Group B standings
Pos	Team	Pld	W	L	NR	Pts	NRR	Qualification
1	Zimbabwe (H)	3	3	0	0	6	5.262	Advanced to the semi-final
2	Tanzania	3	2	1	0	4	−1.013	Advanced to the semi-final
3	Uganda	3	1	2	0	2	0.394	Advanced to the play-offs
4	Botswana	3	0	3	0	0	−5.198	Advanced to the play-offs

Source: ESPNcricinfo
(H) Host

Knockout stage

- Namibia defeated Tanzania by 63 runs in the first semi-final.
- Zimbabwe defeated Kenya by 7 wickets in the second semi-final.
- Zimbabwe defeated Namibia by 7 wickets in the final.

== Americas qualifier ==
The qualification stages were as follows:

- Sub-regional qualifier: Nine teams played in round-robin format for 36 matches from 6 to 16 December 2024 in Argentina.
- Regional final: Four teams played in double round-robin format for 12 matches from 15 to 22 June 2025 in Canada.

=== Americas sub-regional qualifier ===
The sub-regional qualifier was hosted by the Argentine Cricket Association. The top three sides of the sub-regional qualifier (Bahamas, Bermuda and the Cayman Islands) advanced to the regional final.

Qualifier standings
Pos	Team	Pld	W	L	NR	Pts	NRR	Qualification
1	Bermuda	8	7	0	1	15	3.601	Advanced to the regional final
2	Cayman Islands	8	6	2	0	12	2.089	Advanced to the regional final
3	Bahamas	8	6	2	0	12	0.258	Advanced to the regional final
4	Argentina (H)	8	5	2	1	11	0.266	Eliminated
5	Belize	8	3	5	0	6	−0.551	Eliminated
6	Mexico	8	2	6	0	4	−0.326	Eliminated
7	Panama	8	2	6	0	4	−1.304	Eliminated
8	Suriname	8	2	6	0	4	−1.309	Eliminated
9	Brazil	8	2	6	0	4	−2.213	Eliminated

Source: ESPNcricinfo
(H) Host

=== Americas regional final ===
Canada directly qualified for the regional final after receiving a bye due to their participation in the 2024 T20 World Cup. The regional final was hosted by Cricket Canada. The winners of the regional final (Canada) qualified for the 2026 T20 World Cup.

Final standings
Pos	Team	Pld	W	L	NR	Pts	NRR	Qualification
1	Canada (H)	6	6	0	0	12	4.843	Qualified for the 2026 Men's T20 World Cup
2	Bermuda	6	3	3	0	6	0.186	Eliminated
3	Cayman Islands	6	3	3	0	6	−0.705	Eliminated
4	Bahamas	6	0	6	0	0	−4.234	Eliminated

Source: ESPNcricinfo
(H) Host

== Asia–East Asia-Pacific qualifier ==
The qualification stages were as follows:

- Asia qualifier A: Seven teams played in round-robin format for 21 matches from 30 August to 9 September 2024 in Malaysia.
- Asia qualifier B: Seven teams played in round-robin format for 21 matches from 19 to 28 November 2024 in Qatar.
- EAP qualifier A: Four teams played in double round-robin format for 12 matches from 17 to 24 August 2024 in Samoa.
- EAP qualifier B: Four teams played in double round-robin format for 12 matches from 28 September to 5 October 2024 in South Korea.
- Combined regional final: Nine teams divided into three groups of three played in round-robin format followed by a six team round-robin for a total of 21 matches from 1 to 17 October 2025 in Oman.

=== Asia sub-regional qualifiers ===
The sub-regional qualifiers were hosted by the Malaysian Cricket Association and the Qatar Cricket Association. The top two sides of each sub-regional qualifier (Kuwait and Malaysia from qualifier A and Qatar and the United Arab Emirates from qualifier B) advanced to the combined regional final.

==== Asia qualifier A ====
Qualifier A standings
Pos	Team	Pld	W	L	NR	Pts	NRR	Qualification
1	Malaysia (H)	6	5	1	0	10	2.612	Advanced to the regional final
2	Kuwait	6	4	1	1	9	5.053	Advanced to the regional final
3	Hong Kong	6	4	1	1	9	4.945	Eliminated
4	Singapore	6	4	2	0	8	3.141	Eliminated
5	Maldives	6	2	4	0	4	−1.368	Eliminated
6	Myanmar	6	1	5	0	2	−3.712	Eliminated
7	Mongolia	6	0	6	0	0	−7.145	Eliminated

Source: ESPNcricinfo
(H) Host

==== Asia qualifier B ====
Qualifier B standings
Pos	Team	Pld	W	L	NR	Pts	NRR	Qualification
1	United Arab Emirates	6	6	0	0	12	2.541	Advanced to the regional final
2	Qatar (H)	6	5	1	0	10	0.876	Advanced to the regional final
3	Bahrain	6	3	3	0	6	0.958	Eliminated
4	Saudi Arabia	6	3	3	0	6	0.869	Eliminated
5	Thailand	6	3	3	0	6	−1.330	Eliminated
6	Cambodia	6	1	5	0	2	−1.467	Eliminated
7	Bhutan	6	0	6	0	0	−2.367	Eliminated

Source: ESPNcricinfo
(H) Host

=== East Asia-Pacific sub-regional qualifiers ===
The sub-regional qualifiers were hosted by the Samoa International Cricket Association and the Korea Cricket Association. The winners of each sub-regional qualifier (Samoa from qualifier A and Japan from qualifier B) advanced to the combined regional final.

==== EAP qualifier A ====
Qualifier A standings
Pos	Team	Pld	W	L	NR	Pts	NRR	Qualification
1	Samoa (H)	6	4	2	0	8	1.270	Advanced to the regional final
2	Cook Islands	6	4	2	0	8	−0.008	Eliminated
3	Fiji	6	3	3	0	6	−0.858	Eliminated
4	Vanuatu	6	1	5	0	2	−0.306	Eliminated

Source: ESPNcricinfo
(H) Host

==== EAP qualifier B ====
Qualifier B standings
Pos	Team	Pld	W	L	NR	Pts	NRR	Qualification
1	Japan	6	6	0	0	12	3.527	Advanced to the regional final
2	Philippines	6	3	3	0	6	1.235	Eliminated
3	Indonesia	6	3	3	0	6	−1.834	Eliminated
4	South Korea (H)	6	0	6	0	0	−2.840	Eliminated

Source: ESPNcricinfo
(H) Host

=== Asia–EAP combined regional final ===
Nepal, Oman and Papua New Guinea directly qualified for the regional final after receiving a bye due to their participation in the 2024 T20 World Cup. The combined regional final was hosted by the Oman Cricket. The top three sides of the regional final (Nepal, Oman and the United Arab Emirates) qualified for the 2026 T20 World Cup.

Group stage

Group A standings
Pos	Team	Pld	W	L	NR	Pts	NRR	Qualification
1	United Arab Emirates	2	2	0	0	4	0.584	Advanced to the Super 6
2	Qatar	2	1	1	0	2	0.225	Advanced to the Super 6
3	Malaysia	2	0	2	0	0	−0.873	Eliminated

Source: ESPNcricinfo

Group B standings
Pos	Team	Pld	W	L	NR	Pts	NRR	Qualification
1	Nepal	2	2	0	0	4	1.834	Advanced to the Super 6
2	Japan	2	1	1	0	2	−0.309	Advanced to the Super 6
3	Kuwait	2	0	2	0	0	−1.576	Eliminated

Source: ESPNcricinfo

Group C standings
Pos	Team	Pld	W	L	NR	Pts	NRR	Qualification
1	Oman (H)	2	2	0	0	4	1.874	Advanced to the Super 6
2	Samoa	2	1	1	0	2	−0.302	Advanced to the Super 6
3	Papua New Guinea	2	0	2	0	0	−1.574	Eliminated

Source: ESPNcricinfo
(H) Host

Super 6 stage

Super 6 stage standings
Pos	Team	Pld	W	L	NR	Pts	NRR	Qualification
1	Nepal	5	5	0	0	10	1.849	Qualified for the 2026 Men's T20 World Cup
2	Oman	5	4	1	0	8	0.456	Qualified for the 2026 Men's T20 World Cup
3	United Arab Emirates	5	3	2	0	6	1.493	Qualified for the 2026 Men's T20 World Cup
4	Qatar	5	2	3	0	4	−0.114	Eliminated
5	Japan	5	1	4	0	2	−1.033	Eliminated
6	Samoa	5	0	5	0	0	−2.809	Eliminated

Source: ESPNcricinfo

== Europe qualifier ==
The qualification stages were as follows:

- Qualifier A: Ten teams divided into two groups of five played in round-robin format followed by playoffs for a total of 24 matches from 9 to 16 June 2024 in Italy.
- Qualifier B: Ten teams divided into two groups of five played in round-robin format followed by playoffs for a total of 24 matches from 7 to 14 July 2024 in Germany.
- Qualifier C: Ten teams divided into two groups of five played in round-robin format followed by playoffs for a total of 24 matches from 21 to 28 August 2024 in Guernsey.
- Regional final: Five teams played in round-robin format for 10 matches from 5 to 11 July 2025 in the Netherlands.

=== Europe sub-regional qualifiers ===
The sub-regional qualifiers were hosted by the Italian Cricket Federation, the German Cricket Federation and the Guernsey Cricket Board. The winners of each sub-regional qualifier (Italy from qualifier A, Jersey from qualifier B and Guernsey from qualifier C) advanced to the regional final.

==== Europe qualifier A ====
Group stage

Group A standings
Pos	Team	Pld	W	L	NR	Pts	NRR	Qualification
1	Italy (H)	4	4	0	0	8	2.429	Advanced to the final
2	France	4	3	1	0	6	0.702	Advanced to the 3rd place play-off
3	Isle of Man	4	2	2	0	4	1.180	Advanced to the 5th place play-off
4	Luxembourg	4	1	3	0	2	−1.000	Advanced to the 7th place play-off
5	Turkey	4	0	4	0	0	−3.308	Eliminated

Source: ESPNcricinfo
(H) Host

Group B standings
Pos	Team	Pld	W	L	NR	Pts	NRR	Qualification
1	Romania	4	4	0	0	8	1.404	Advanced to the final
2	Austria	4	3	1	0	6	1.466	Advanced to the 3rd place play-off
3	Portugal	4	1	3	0	2	−0.493	Advanced to the 5th place play-off
4	Israel	4	1	3	0	2	−0.984	Advanced to the 7th place play-off
5	Hungary	4	1	3	0	2	−1.075	Eliminated

Source: ESPNcricinfo

Qualifier A final

- Italy defeated Romania by 160 runs.

==== Europe qualifier B ====
Group stage

Group A standings
Pos	Team	Pld	W	L	NR	Pts	NRR	Qualification
1	Jersey	4	3	0	1	7	7.333	Advanced to the final
2	Croatia	4	2	1	1	5	−0.266	Advanced to the 3rd place play-off
3	Belgium	4	2	2	0	4	−0.363	Eliminated
4	Switzerland	4	2	2	0	4	−1.089	Eliminated
5	Serbia	4	0	4	0	0	−4.247	Eliminated

Source: ESPNcricinfo

Group B standings
Pos	Team	Pld	W	L	NR	Pts	NRR	Qualification
1	Norway	4	4	0	0	8	2.709	Advanced to the final
2	Germany (H)	4	2	1	1	5	0.583	Advanced to the 3rd place play-off
3	Sweden	4	2	2	0	4	1.895	Eliminated
4	Slovenia	4	1	2	1	3	−3.363	Eliminated
5	Gibraltar	4	0	4	0	0	−2.126	Eliminated

Source: ESPNcricinfo
(H) Host

Qualifier B final

- Jersey defeated Norway by 6 wickets.

==== Europe qualifier C ====
Group stage

Group A standings
Pos	Team	Pld	W	L	NR	Pts	NRR	Qualification
1	Denmark	4	3	0	1	7	4.867	Advanced to the final
2	Spain	4	3	0	1	7	1.263	Advanced to the 3rd place play-off
3	Czech Republic	4	2	2	0	4	−0.373	Advanced to the 5th place play-off
4	Cyprus	4	1	3	0	2	−1.629	Advanced to the 7th place play-off
5	Greece	4	0	4	0	0	−2.876	Eliminated

Source: ESPNcricinfo

Group B standings
Pos	Team	Pld	W	L	NR	Pts	NRR	Qualification
1	Guernsey (H)	4	3	1	0	6	2.952	Advanced to the final
2	Finland	4	3	1	0	6	2.184	Advanced to the 3rd place play-off
3	Estonia	4	3	1	0	6	−0.102	Advanced to the 5th place play-off
4	Malta	4	1	3	0	2	−0.577	Advanced to the 7th place play-off
5	Bulgaria	4	0	4	0	0	−3.975	Eliminated

Source: ESPNcricinfo
(H) Host

Qualifier C final

- Guernsey defeated Denmark by 6 wickets.

=== Europe regional final ===
The Netherlands and Scotland directly qualified for the regional final after receiving a bye due to their participation in the 2024 T20 World Cup. The regional final was hosted by the Royal Dutch Cricket Association The top two sides of the regional final (Italy and the Netherlands) qualified for the 2026 T20 World Cup.

Final standings
Pos	Team	Pld	W	L	NR	Pts	NRR	Qualification
1	Netherlands (H)	4	3	1	0	6	1.281	Qualified for the 2026 Men's T20 World Cup
2	Italy	4	2	1	1	5	0.612	Qualified for the 2026 Men's T20 World Cup
3	Jersey	4	2	1	1	5	0.306	Eliminated
4	Scotland (Note: Although Scotland were eliminated in the qualifier; they qualified for the tournament based on ICC Rankings to replace Bangladesh after the latter's withdrawal.)	4	1	2	1	3	−0.117	Qualified for the 2026 Men's T20 World Cup
5	Guernsey	4	0	3	1	1	−2.517	Eliminated

Source: Cricinfo
(H) Host

== Statistics ==
Throughout the qualifiers, Alishan Sharafu of the United Arab Emirates scored the most runs (508 runs from 12 innings), while Festus Benn of Bahrain took the most wickets (22 wickets from 13 innings).

Most runs
Runs	Player	Team
508	Alishan Sharafu	United Arab Emirates
499	Brian Bennett	Zimbabwe
466	Jermaine Baker	Cayman Islands
402	Kendel Kadowaki-Fleming	Japan
396	Rakep Patel	Kenya

Most wickets
Wickets	Player	Team
22	Festus Benn	Bahamas
19	Ridwan Abdulkareem	Nigeria
19	Derrick Brangman	Bermuda
19	Richard Ngarava	Zimbabwe
18	Alessandro Morris	Cayman Islands
