= 2015 Africa Twenty20 Division Three =

2015 ICC World Cricket League Africa Region Twenty20 Division Three
- Administrator: International Cricket Council
- Cricket format: Twenty20
- Tournament format: Round-robin
- Participants: 8
- Matches: 32
- Official website: ICC Africa Region

The 2015 ICC World Cricket League Africa Region Twenty20 Division Three is a cricket tournament that took place in 2015. South Africa won the tournament

== Teams ==
Countries that participated are as follows:

- Cameroon
- Gambia
- Morocco
- Mali
- Rwanda
- Saint Helena
- Sierra Leone
- Eswatini
- South Africa
