= Deso =

Deso, DeSo, or DESO may refer to:

- DeSo, a social media-oriented blockchain created in 2021
  - $DESO, the native cryptocurrency of the DeSo blockchain
- Designated driver, in Australian slang
- UK Defence and Security Exports, a British arms export organization formerly known as "Defence Export Services Organisation"
- Deso Kalvin (fl. 2021–2022), a cricket player from Seychelles
- RKVV DESO, a Dutch football club
- An acronym for "direct effect of social origins", in Social mobility
- Departmental Entry Subordinate Officers, a kind of assistant commandant in India
- Deso (fl. 1920), a player in the Serbian football club FK Vojvodina; see List of FK Vojvodina players
- Any drug whose name begins with "deso"; see List of drugs: De#deso-desy

== See also ==
- Deso Dogg (1975–2018), a German rapper and jihadist
- Desso Sports, a company that created the GrassMaster brand of sports playing fields
- Diso, a town in Italy
- Daeso (60 BC–20 AD), the last king of the Korean kingdom of Dongbuyeo
