= List of Mali Twenty20 International cricketers =

This is a list of Mali Twenty20 International cricketers.

In April 2018, the International Cricket Council (ICC) decided to grant full Twenty20 International (T20I) status to all its members. Therefore, all Twenty20 matches played between Mali and other ICC members after 1 January 2019 will be eligible to have T20I status.

This list will comprise all members of the Mali cricket team who have played at least one T20I match. It is initially arranged in the order in which each player won his first Twenty20 cap. Where more than one player will win his first Twenty20 cap in the same match, those players will be listed alphabetically by surname (according to the name format used by Cricinfo).

Mali played their first match with T20I status on 17 November 2022 against Lesotho during the 2022–23 ICC Men's T20 World Cup Africa Qualifier.

== Key ==
General

- ‡ – Captain
- † – Wicket-keeper
- First – Year of debut
- Last – Year of latest game
- Mat – Number of matches played

Batting

- Runs – Runs scored in career
- HS – Highest score
- Avg – Runs scored per dismissal
- * – Batsman remained not out
- 50 – Half-centuries scored

Bowling

- Balls – Balls bowled in career
- Wkt – Wickets taken in career
- BBI – Best bowling in an innings
- Ave – Average runs per wicket

Fielding

- Ca – Catches taken
- St – Stumpings affected

== List of players ==
Statistics are correct as of 30 May 2026.

Mali T20I cricketers
Cap	Name	First	Last	Mat	Batting				Bowling				Fielding		Ref(s)
Cap	Name	First	Last	Mat	Runs	HS	Avg	50	Balls	Wkt	BBI	Ave	Ca	St	Ref(s)
1	Mohamed Coulibaly	2022	2026	14	36	6	2.76	0	41	2	1/12	36.50	2	0	
2	Mahamadou Diaby	2022	2023	10	71	31	7.88	0	62	6	2/6	14.00	1	0	
3	Sekou Diaby	2022	2026	15	60	41*	7.50	0	192	4	1/16	72.50	0	0	
4	Moustapha Diakite	2022	2026	13	46	14	3.53	0	–	–	–	–	0	0	
5	Mamadou Diawara	2022	2023	10	38	11	4.75	0	96	3	2/40	44.33	0	0	
6	Sanze Kamate	2022	2026	21	94	17*	5.22	0	102	3	3088	51.00	4	0	
7	Cheick Keita‡	2022	2026	18	61	35	4.06	0	85	7	2/7	15.42	5	0	
8	Theodore Macalou	2022	2026	21	99	28*	6.18	0	227	14	3/19	20.28	4	0	
9	Lamissa Sanogo	2022	2026	21	33	15*	3.30	0	126	6	3/27	30.16	4	0	
10	Mamadou Sidibe	2022	2022	3	5	5	1.66	0	–	–	–	–	0	0	
11	Daouda Traore†	2022	2023	7	10	6	3.33	0	–	–	–	–	1	0	
12	Lassina Berthe	2022	2026	11	11	7	1.83	0	6	–	–	–	1	0	
13	Mahamadou Malle	2022	2024	10	22	9	2.75	0	24	1	1/13	33.00	1	0	
14	Zakaria Makadji†	2022	2026	14	45	22	3.75	0	–	–	–	–	1	1	
15	Amara Nimaga	2024	2024	3	11	7	5.50	0	–	–	–	–	0	0	
16	Yacouba Konate‡	2024	2026	11	37	17	3.70	0	36	0	–	–	2	0	
17	Mohamed Fadiga	2024	2024	1	0	0	0.00	0	–	–	–	–	0	0	
18	Amadou Fofana†	2024	2024	3	3	2	1.00	0	–	–	–	–	0	0	
19	Dramane Berthe	2024	2024	2	0	0	0.00	0	–	–	–	–	0	0	
20	Babjee Botcha	2026	2026	5	21	13	4.20	0	–	–	–	–	1	0	
21	Akshaykumar Prajapati	2026	2026	6	48	15	8.00	0	110	6	2/14	20.16	1	0	
22	Shetty Shailesh	2026	2026	6	38	11	7.60	0	78	4	2/37	23.25	0	0	
23	Vamshi Reddy	2026	2026	6	81	39	13.50	0	60	2	1/19	46.50	1	0	
