= List of Saint Helena Twenty20 International cricketers =

This is a list of Saint Helena Twenty20 International cricketers.

In April 2018, the ICC decided to grant full Twenty20 International (T20I) status to all its members. Therefore, all Twenty20 matches played between Saint Helena and other ICC members after 1 January 2019 have the T20I status.

This list will comprise names of all members of the Saint Helena cricket team who have played at least one T20I match. It is initially arranged in the order in which each player won his first Twenty20 cap. Where more than one player will win his first Twenty20 cap in the same match, those players will be listed alphabetically by surname (according to the name format used by Cricinfo).

Saint Helena played their first match with T20I status on 17 November 2022 against Kenya during the 2022–23 ICC Men's T20 World Cup Africa Qualifier.

== Key ==
General

- ‡ – Captain
- † – Wicket-keeper
- First – Year of debut
- Last – Year of latest game
- Mat – Number of matches played

Batting

- Runs – Runs scored in career
- HS – Highest score
- Avg – Runs scored per dismissal
- * – Batsman remained not out
- 50 – Half-centuries scored

Bowling

- Balls – Balls bowled in career
- Wkt – Wickets taken in career
- BBI – Best bowling in an innings
- Ave – Average runs per wicket

Fielding

- Ca – Catches taken
- St – Stumpings affected

== List of players ==
Statistics are correct as of 28 March 2026.

Saint Helena T20I cricketers
Cap	Name	First	Last	Mat	Batting				Bowling				Fielding		Ref(s)
Cap	Name	First	Last	Mat	Runs	HS	Avg	50	Balls	Wkt	BBI	Ave	Ca	St	Ref(s)
1	Scott Crowie‡	2022	2024	12	182	54*	26.00	1	134	10	3/21	12.80	2	0	
2	Jamie Ellick	2022	2022	2	–	–	–	–	–	–	–	–	0	0	
3	Rhys Francis	2022	2026	13	39	15	4.33	0	108	4	3/17	32.25	3	0	
4	Jordi Henry	2022	2026	11	88	23	9.77	0	124	7	3/28	25.85	1	0	
5	Brett Isaac	2022	2024	11	75	34	11.00	0	84	1	1/22	112.00	4	0	
6	Gareth Johnson	2022	2022	7	5	3	5.00	0	78	1	1/13	84.00	3	0	
7	Alex Langham	2022	2022	7	58	39	11.60	0	6	0	–	–	0	0	
8	Aiden Leo	2022	2026	16	105	24	9.54	0	168	9	2/7	23.22	1	0	
9	Cliff Richards‡†	2022	2026	16	42	10*	4.20	0	–	–	–	–	1	1	
10	Barry Stroud	2022	2026	16	32	10*	8.00	0	246	7	2/17	32.85	1	0	
11	Andrew Yon	2022	2026	16	217	67	16.69	2	168	12	5/10	16.66	0	0	
12	Dax Richards	2022	2022	5	10	4	3.33	0	–	–	–	–	2	0	
13	Jamie Essex	2024	2026	6	87	30	14.50	0	28	0	–	–	0	0	
14	Branden Leo	2024	2026	6	4	4*	4.00	0	94	5	2/32	25.80	0	0	
15	Joey Thomas	2024	2026	9	54	26*	10.80	0	102	5	2/27	26.40	1	0	
16	David Young†	2024	2024	5	18	13	4.50	0	–	–	–	–	0	0	
17	Dane Leo	2024	2026	5	6	4	2.00	0	–	–	–	–	2	0	
18	Delroy Leo	2024	2026	7	72	31	12.00	0	–	–	–	–	0	0	
19	Jordan Yon	2024	2026	6	15	9*	15.00	0	72	5	4/3	16.00	0	0	
