= Malian Cricket Federation =

Cricket federation

The Malian Cricket Federation (French: Fédération Malienne de Cricket, FeMaCrik) is the official governing body of the sport of cricket in Mali. It became an associate member of the International Cricket Council in 2017.

The Malian Cricket Federation was co-founded by Kawory Berthe, a Malian English-teacher and Phil Watson from Wales, in 2003. After three years of growing the game, the remodeled FeMaCrick became Mali's 25th officially recognised sports federation.

In May 2007, Mali sent a men's team to participate in the inaugural North & West African Championship in Banjul, Gambia. Their international debut was against the host team (Gambia) which they lost.

The first national championships were held in 2008.

== See also ==
- Mali national cricket team
- Mali women's national cricket team
