= Seychelles Cricket Association =

The Seychelles Cricket Association is the official governing body of the sport of cricket in the Seychelles. Its current headquarters is in Roche Caiman, Seychelles.

The Seychelles Cricket Association is the Seychelles's representative at the International Cricket Council. Seychelles became an affiliate member of that body in 2010; they were the 105th nation to achieve membership. The Seychelles Cricket Association also a member of the African Cricket Association.
