= Mali women's national cricket team =

Cricket team

Mali
- Flag of Mali
- Association: Malian Cricket Federation

International Cricket Council
- ICC status: Associate member (2017); Affiliate member (2005)
- ICC region: Africa
ICC Rankings	Current	Best-ever
T20I	---	51st (30 Sep 2019)

T20 Internationals
- First T20I: v Rwanda at Kicukiro Oval, Kigali; 18 June 2019
- Last T20I: v Uganda at Kicukiro Oval, Kigali; 23 June 2019
T20Is	Played	Won/Lost
Total	6	0/6 (0 ties, 0 no results)
This year	0	0/0 (0 ties, 0 no results)
- As of 1 January 2024

The Mali national women's cricket team represents Mali in international women's cricket. The team is organised by the Malian Cricket Federation and is nicknamed the "Lady Eagles of Cricket" (French: Les Aigles Dames de cricket). It made its international debut in 2015 and has played in regional tournaments in Africa, but is yet to participate in an International Cricket Council (ICC) pathway event.

== History ==
The Malian Cricket Federation established a national women's programme in March 2014. Captained by Aminata Diamouténé, Mali made its international debut at the inaugural 2015 North West Africa Cricket Council (NWACC) women's tournament held in the Gambia. The team finished fourth behind Sierra Leone, Gambia, and Ghana.

In April 2018, the International Cricket Council (ICC) granted full Women's Twenty20 International (WT20I) status to all its members. Therefore, all Twenty20 matches played between Mali women and other ICC members after 1 July 2018 have the WT20I status.

The team was one of four sides to play in the 2019 Kwibuka Women's T20 Tournament at the Gahanga International Cricket Stadium in Rwanda. On 18 June 2019, in their opening match, against hosts Rwanda women, the team was bowled out for just six runs in nine overs. Only one cricketer for Mali, opener Mariam Samake, scored a run in the match, with nine other players dismissed for a duck and extras contributed the other five runs to the total. It was the first time an innings of an international cricket match had nine ducks on the scorecard. Rwanda women chased down the target of seven runs in four balls, winning the match by ten wickets. It was the lowest team total in a completed WT20I match.

In their next two matches of the tournament, against Tanzania and Uganda, the team were bowled out for eleven and ten runs respectively. Therefore, Mali recorded the three lowest totals in WT20Is in their first three matches on three consecutive days. Uganda scored 314 runs from their twenty overs, recording the highest total in a WT20I match. Mali lost the match by 304 runs, the biggest margin of defeat by runs in a WT20I fixture. Mali went on to lose all of their matches in the tournament, finishing with totals of 6, 11, 10, 30/9, 17 and 14 from the six matches they played. Following the conclusion of the tournament, some cricket statisticians questioned the ICC's decision to grant full international status to all of Mali's matches.

== Records and statistics ==
International Match Summary — Mali Women

Last Updated 23 June 2019

Playing Record
Format	M	W	L	T	NR	Inaugural Match
Twenty20 Internationals	6	0	6	0	0	18 June 2019

=== Twenty20 International ===
T20I record versus other nations

Records complete to WT20I #678. Last updated 23 June 2019.

Opponent	M	W	L	T	NR	First match	First win
ICC Associate members
Rwanda	2	0	2	0	0	18 June 2019	
Tanzania	2	0	2	0	0	19 June 2019	
Uganda	2	0	2	0	0	20 June 2019	

== See also ==
- List of Mali women Twenty20 International cricketers
