= 2024 Men's T20 World Cup Europe Sub-regional Qualifier C =

Qualification tournament for the 2026 T20WC in Europe region

2024 ICC Men's T20 World Cup Europe Sub-regional Qualifier C
- Dates: 21 – 28 August 2024
- Administrator: ICC Europe
- Cricket format: Twenty20 International
- Tournament format(s): Group stage and knockouts
- Host: Guernsey
- Champions: Guernsey
- Runners-up: Denmark
- Participants: 10
- Matches: 24
- Player of the series: (Denmark) Hamid Shah
- Most runs: (Denmark) Hamid Shah (272)
- Most wickets: (Guernsey) Charlie Forshaw (12)

The 2024 ICC Men's T20 World Cup Europe Sub-regional Qualifier C was a cricket tournament that formed part of the qualification process for the 2026 Men's T20 World Cup. It was hosted by Guernsey in August 2024.

The winners of the tournament, Guernsey advanced to the regional final, where they will be joined by Netherlands and Scotland who were given a bye after having participated in the previous T20 World Cup, and two other teams from sub-regional qualifiers A and B.

== Squads ==
Bulgaria	Cyprus	Czech Republic	Denmark	Estonia
Prakash Mishra (c); Agagyul Ahmedhel; Zeerak Chughtai; Anthony Dowling; Oscar Duff; Milen Gogev; Firas Hussain; Dimo Nikolov; Danyal Raja; Ali Rasool; Omar Rassol (wk); Gagandeep Singh; Huzaif Yousuf; Isa Zaroo	Scott Burdekin (c); Roshan Siriwardena (vc); Scott Austin; James Chialoufas; Preetaj Deol; Mangala Gunasekara; Vimal Khanduri; Buddika Mahesh; Roman Mazumder; Sachithra Pathirana (wk); Kamal Raiz; Chamal Sadun; Arjun Shahi; Taranjit Singh	Dylan Steyn (c); Naveed Ahmed; Riaz Afridi; Rahat Ali; Sazib Bhuiyan; Shubhranshu Chaudhary; Sabawoon Davizi; Abul Farhad; Sahil Grover (wk); Divyendra Singh (wk); Ritik Tomar; Neeraj Tyagi; Muralidhara Vandrasi; Martin Worndl	Hamid Shah (c); Taranjit Bharaj (vc, wk); Saif Ahmad; Toqeer Ahmad; Surya Anand; Saran Aslam; Oliver Hald; Eshan Karimi; Delawar Khan; Nicolaj Laegsgaard; Abdullah Mahmood; Shangeev Thanikaithasan; Torr Turner (wk); Shakeel Zeb	Arslan Amjad (c); Sahil Chauhan; Pranay Gheewala; Steffan Gooch; Stuart Hook (wk); Habib Khan; Shayan Khan; Ali Masood; Bilal Masud; Aditya Paul; Dave Robson; Rudesh Sekaran (wk); Marko Vaik; Kalle Vislapuu
Finland	Greece	Guernsey	Malta	Spain
Amjad Sher (c); Mahesh Tambe (vc); Akhil Arjunan; Ghulam Abbas Butt; Hariharan Dandapani; Ekhpelwak Kuchey; Parveen Kumar; Raaz Mohammad; Faheem Nellancheri (wk); Jordan O'Brien; Vanraaj Padhaal; Ziaur Rehman; Atif Rasheed; Nicholas Salonen; Jonathan Scamans (wk)	Aslam Mohammad (c); Sajid Khan Afridi; Raza Ali; Zubair Ashraf; Christodoulos Bogdanos; Georgios Galanis; Andreas Gasteratos; Nikolaos Katechis; Sinan Khan; Amarpreet Mehmi; Ali Muaaz; Samader Shadab; Muhammad Tahir; Spyridon Vasilakis	Oliver Nightingale (c); Tom Nightingale (vc); Martin-Dale Bradley; Luke Bichard; Josh Butler; Oliver Clapham; Isaac Damarell (wk); Ben Ferbrache; Ben Fitchet; Charlie Forshaw; Harry Johnson; Adam Martel; Dane Mullen; Matthew Stokes	Zeeshan Khan (c); Vidusha Arachchige; Bikram Arora; Rockey Dianish; Chanjal Sudarsanan (wk); Basil George; Eldose Mathew; Fanyan Mughal; Darshit Patankar (wk); Justin Shaju; Jaspal Singh; Jaswinder Singh; Gopal Thakur	Christian Munoz-Mills (c); Raja Adeel; Hassan Ali; Yasir Ali; Mohammad Atif; Lorne Burns; Hamza Dar; Alec Davidson Soler (wk); Daniel Doyle-Calle; Sebastian Hughes-Pinan; Mohammad Ihsan (wk); Charlie Rumistrzewicz; Shafat Ali Syed; Mohammad Yasin

== Group stage ==
=== Group A ===
Group A standings
Pos	Team	Pld	W	L	NR	Pts	NRR	Qualification
1	Denmark	4	3	0	1	7	4.867	Advanced to the final
2	Spain	4	3	0	1	7	1.263	Advanced to the 3rd place play-off
3	Czech Republic	4	2	2	0	4	−0.373	Advanced to the 5th place play-off
4	Cyprus	4	1	3	0	2	−1.629	Advanced to the 7th place play-off
5	Greece	4	0	4	0	0	−2.876	Eliminated

Source: ESPNcricinfo

21 August 2024
10:30
Scorecard

Spain; 152/6 (20 overs)	v	Cyprus; 137/9 (20 overs)
Daniel Doyle-Calle 52 (35); Arjun Shahi 3/25 (4 overs)		Roman Mazumder 41 (36); Yasir Ali 3/22 (3 overs)

Spain won by 15 runs
King George V Sports Ground, Castel
Umpires: Azam Baig (Ire) and Anna Harris (Eng)
Player of the match: Alec Davidson Soler (Esp)

- Cyprus won the toss and elected to field.
- Preetaj Deol and Vimal Khanduri (Cyp) both made their T20I debuts.

21 August 2024
15:30
Scorecard

Denmark; 225/6 (20 overs)	v	Czech Republic; 107/8 (20 overs)
Hamid Shah 100 (58); Sazib Bhuiyan 2/23 (3 overs)		Dylan Steyn 29 (17); Toqeer Ahmad 3/21 (3 overs)

Denmark won by 118 runs
King George V Sports Ground, Castel
Umpires: Azam Baig (Ire) and Jareth McCready (Ire)
Player of the match: Hamid Shah (Den)

- Denmark won the toss and elected to bat.
- Martin Worndl (Cze) made his T20I debut.
- Hamid Shah became the first player for Denmark to score a century in men's T20Is.

22 August 2024
10:30
Scorecard

Denmark; 166/8 (20 overs)	v	Greece; 134/8 (20 overs)
Hamid Shah 59 (45); Sinan Khan 3/36 (4 overs)		Christodoulos Bogdanos 39* (46); Delawar Khan 2/17 (3 overs)

Denmark won by 32 runs
Guernsey Rovers Athletic Club Ground, Port Soif
Umpires: Anna Harris (Eng) and Richard Veillard (Gue)
Player of the match: Hamid Shah (Den)

- Greece won the toss and elected to field.
- Sajid Khan Afridi, Nikolaos Katechis, Sinan Khan, Ali Muaaz, Samader Shadab and Spyridon Vasilakis (Gre) all made their T20I debuts.

22 August 2024
15:30
Scorecard

Spain; 179/9 (20 overs)	v	Czech Republic; 178/6 (20 overs)
Daniel Doyle-Calle 72 (41); Shubhranshu Chaudhary 3/17 (3 overs)		Sahil Grover 47 (28); Yasir Ali 2/22 (4 overs)

Spain won by 1 run
Guernsey Rovers Athletic Club Ground, Port Soif
Umpires: Anna Harris (Eng) and Steve Wood (Ire)
Player of the match: Sazib Bhuiyan (Cze)

- Czech Republic won the toss and elected to field.
- Muralidhara Vandrasi (Cze) made his T20I debut.

24 August 2024
10:30
Scorecard

Denmark	v	Spain

Match abandoned
King George V Sports Ground, Castel
Umpires: Richard Veillard (Gue) and Steve Wood (Ire)

- No toss.
- No play was possible due to rain.

24 August 2024
15:30
Scorecard

Greece; 100 (19.4 overs)	v	Cyprus; 102/2 (12.2 overs)
Christodoulos Bogdanos 25 (31); Scott Burdekin 3/20 (4 overs)		Scott Austin 25* (16); Samader Shadab 1/26 (2 overs)

Cyprus won by 8 wickets
King George V Sports Ground, Castel
Umpires: Richard Veillard (Gue) and Russell Warren (Eng)
Player of the match: Scott Burdekin (Cyp)

- Greece won the toss and elected to bat.

25 August 2024
10:30
Scorecard

Cyprus; 67 (15.4 overs)	v	Czech Republic; 68/6 (18 overs)
Chamal Sadun 19 (25); Muralidhara Vandrasi 4/25 (4 overs)		Martin Worndl 30* (51); Taranjit Singh 2/7 (4 overs)

Czech Republic won by 4 wickets
Guernsey Rovers Athletic Club Ground, Port Soif
Umpires: Russell Warren (Eng) and Steve Wood (Ire)
Player of the match: Muralidhara Vandrasi (Cze)

- Cyprus won the toss and elected to bat.

25 August 2024
15:30
Scorecard

Greece; 96/9 (20 overs)	v	Spain; 99/3 (13 overs)
Sajid Khan Afridi 27 (22); Yasir Ali 3/12 (4 overs)		Hamza Dar 32 (24); Spyridon Vasilakis 2/9 (2 overs)

Spain won by 7 wickets
Guernsey Rovers Athletic Club Ground, Port Soif
Umpires: Jareth McCready (Ire) and Steve Wood (Ire)
Player of the match: Yasir Ali (Esp)

- Greece won the toss and elected to bat.
- Muhammad Tahir (Gre) made his T20I debut.

27 August 2024
10:30
Scorecard

Denmark; 205/4 (20 overs)	v	Cyprus; 63/9 (20 overs)
Hamid Shah 91 (55); Taranjit Singh 1/32 (4 overs)		Sachithra Pathirana 16* (31); Oliver Hald 3/12 (3 overs)

Denmark won by 142 runs
King George V Sports Ground, Castel
Umpires: Richard Veillard (Gue) and Russell Warren (Eng)
Player of the match: Hamid Shah (Den)

- Denmark won the toss and elected to bat.

27 August 2024
15:30
Scorecard

Czech Republic; 159/6 (20 overs)	v	Greece; 84 (16.4 overs)
Sazib Bhuiyan 59 (42); Muhammad Tahir 1/9 (1.5 overs)		Amarpreet Mehmi 29 (25); Muralidhara Vandrasi 4/19 (4 overs)

Czech Republic won by 75 runs
King George V Sports Ground, Castel
Umpires: Azam Baig (Ire) and Russell Warren (Eng)
Player of the match: Muralidhara Vandrasi (Cze)

- Czech Republic won the toss and elected to bat.

=== Group B ===
Group B standings
Pos	Team	Pld	W	L	NR	Pts	NRR	Qualification
1	Guernsey (H)	4	3	1	0	6	2.952	Advanced to the final
2	Finland	4	3	1	0	6	2.184	Advanced to the 3rd place play-off
3	Estonia	4	3	1	0	6	−0.102	Advanced to the 5th place play-off
4	Malta	4	1	3	0	2	−0.577	Advanced to the 7th place play-off
5	Bulgaria	4	0	4	0	0	−3.975	Eliminated

Source: ESPNcricinfo
(H) Host

21 August 2024
10:30
Scorecard

Bulgaria; 97 (19.5 overs)	v	Guernsey; 99/2 (9.4 overs)
Milen Gogev 27 (24); Martin-Dale Bradley 3/16 (4 overs)		Josh Butler 41* (28); Oscar Duff 2/17 (1.4 overs)

Guernsey won by 8 wickets
Guernsey Rovers Athletic Club Ground, Port Soif
Umpires: Russell Warren (Eng) and Steve Wood (Ire)
Player of the match: Martin-Dale Bradley (Gue)

- Bulgaria won the toss and elected to bat.
- Oscar Duff and Ali Rasool (Bul) both made their T20I debuts.

21 August 2024
15:30
Scorecard

Malta; 117/9 (20 overs)	v	Finland; 118/1 (14.4 overs)
Jaspal Singh 46 (32); Nicholas Salonen 3/20 (4 overs)		Ghulam Abbas Butt 44 (25); Bikram Arora 1/26 (4 overs)

Finland won by 9 wickets
Guernsey Rovers Athletic Club Ground, Port Soif
Umpires: Richard Veillard (Gue) and Steve Wood (Ire)
Player of the match: Nicholas Salonen (Fin)

- Malta won the toss and elected to bat.
- Ekhpelwak Kuchey (Fin), Vidusha Arachchige and Rockey Dianish (Mlt) all made their T20I debuts.

22 August 2024
10:30
Scorecard

Finland; 142/9 (20 overs)	v	Estonia; 143/2 (17.5 overs)
Nicholas Salonen 34 (27); Steffan Gooch 3/20 (4 overs)		Steffan Gooch 72* (52); Raaz Mohammad 1/21 (3 overs)

Estonia won by 8 wickets
King George V Sports Ground, Castel
Umpires: Jareth McCready (Ire) and Russell Warren (Eng)
Player of the match: Steffan Gooch (Est)

- Estonia won the toss and elected to field.
- Shayan Khan (Est) made his T20I debut.

22 August 2024
15:30
Scorecard

Malta; 139 (20 overs)	v	Guernsey; 140/2 (13.5 overs)
Zeeshan Khan 41 (30); Charlie Forshaw 3/31 (4 overs)		Josh Butler 44* (32); Jaswinder Singh 1/21 (2 overs)

Guernsey won by 8 wickets
King George V Sports Ground, Castel
Umpires: Azam Baig (Ire) and Russell Warren (Eng)
Player of the match: Josh Butler (Gue)

- Guernsey won the toss and elected to field.

24 August 2024
10:30
Scorecard

Finland; 90 (12.4 overs)	v	Guernsey; 86 (12.5 overs)
Atif Rasheed 23 (14); Martin-Dale Bradley 3/11 (3 overs)		Oliver Nightingale 33 (22); Raaz Mohammad 4/7 (3 overs)

Finland won by 4 runs
Guernsey Rovers Athletic Club Ground, Port Soif
Umpires: Azam Baig (Ire) and Jareth McCready (Ire)
Player of the match: Raaz Mohammad (Fin)

- Guernsey won the toss and elected to field.
- The match was reduced to 13 overs per side due to rain.

24 August 2024
15:30
Scorecard

Bulgaria; 129/8 (20 overs)	v	Estonia; 131/3 (17 overs)
Firas Hussain 40* (40); Bilal Masud 2/18 (3 overs)		Steffan Gooch 58 (50); Ali Rasool 2/18 (3 overs)

Estonia won by 7 wickets
Guernsey Rovers Athletic Club Ground, Port Soif
Umpires: Anna Harris (Eng) and Jareth McCready (Ire)
Player of the match: Bilal Masud (Est)

- Estonia won the toss and elected to field.

25 August 2024
10:30
Scorecard

Malta; 211/2 (20 overs)	v	Bulgaria; 150/8 (20 overs)
Basil George 103* (63); Prakash Mishra 1/27 (4 overs)		Milen Gogev 55 (31); Justin Shaju 3/23 (4 overs)

Malta won by 61 runs
King George V Sports Ground, Castel
Umpires: Azam Baig (Ire) and Richard Veillard (Gue)
Player of the match: Basil George (Mlt)

- Malta won the toss and elected to bat.
- Anthony Dowling (Bul) made his T20I debut.
- Basil George (Mlt) scored his first century in T20Is.

25 August 2024
15:30
Scorecard

Estonia; 99/8 (20 overs)	v	Guernsey; 102/5 (12.1 overs)
Habib Khan 39 (37); Harry Johnson 3/18 (4 overs)		Tom Nightingale 34 (16); Sahil Chauhan 2/6 (1 over)

Guernsey won by 5 wickets
King George V Sports Ground, Castel
Umpires: Azam Baig (Ire) and Anna Harris (Eng)
Player of the match: Harry Johnson (Gue)

- Guernsey won the toss and elected to field.

27 August 2024
10:30
Scorecard

Finland; 199/8 (20 overs)	v	Bulgaria; 74/9 (20 overs)
Vanraaj Padhaal 58 (39); Danyal Raja 2/26 (3 overs)		Zeerak Chughtai 15 (20); Atif Rasheed 4/13 (4 overs)

Finland won by 125 runs
Guernsey Rovers Athletic Club Ground, Port Soif
Umpires: Anna Harris (Eng) and Jareth McCready (Ire)
Player of the match: Atif Rasheed (Fin)

- Finland won the toss and elected to bat.

27 August 2024
15:30
Scorecard

Malta; 132/8 (20 overs)	v	Estonia; 135/5 (18.5 overs)
Zeeshan Khan 26 (31); Kalle Vislapuu 2/11 (2 overs)		Habib Khan 45 (34); Eldhose Mathew 2/16 (4 overs)

Estonia won by 5 wickets
Guernsey Rovers Athletic Club Ground, Port Soif
Umpires: Anna Harris (Eng) and Steve Wood (Ire)
Player of the match: Habib Khan (Est)

- Malta won the toss and elected to bat.

== Play-offs ==
=== 7th place play-off ===
28 August 2024
10:30
Scorecard

Cyprus; 134 (19.3 overs)	v	Malta; 128/7 (20 overs)
Scott Austin 32 (22); Jaswinder Singh 3/17 (3.3 overs)		Rockey Dianish 48 (51); Scott Burdekin 4/22 (4 overs)

Cyprus won by 6 runs
Guernsey Rovers Athletic Club Ground, Port Soif
Umpires: Jareth McCready (Ire) and Steve Wood (Ire)
Player of the match: Scott Burdekin (Cyp)

- Malta won the toss and elected to field.

=== 5th place play-off ===
28 August 2024
15:30
Scorecard

Czech Republic; 110 (20 overs)	v	Estonia; 112/3 (17.3 overs)
Divyendra Singh 38 (42); Pranay Gheewala 3/22 (3 overs)		Sahil Chauhan 41* (37); Rahat Ali 2/21 (4 overs)

Estonia won by 7 wickets
Guernsey Rovers Athletic Club Ground, Port Soif
Umpires: Jareth McCready (Ire) and Russell Warren
Player of the match: Bilal Masud (Est)

- Estonia won the toss and chose to field.

=== 3rd place play-off ===
28 August 2024
10:30
Scorecard

Spain; 172/6 (20 overs)	v	Finland; 126/7 (20 overs)
Yasir Ali 52 (40); Nicholas Salonen 4/45 (4 overs)		Ziaur Rehman 37* (41); Charlie Rumistrzewicz 5/18 (4 overs)

Spain won by 46 runs
King George V Sports Ground, Castel
Umpires: Azam Baig (Ire) and Richard Veillard (Gue)
Player of the match: Charlie Rumistrzewicz (Esp)

- Finland won the toss and elected to field.

=== Final ===
28 August 2024
15:30
Scorecard

Denmark; 158/7 (20 overs)	v	Guernsey; 159/4 (18.4 overs)
Nicolaj Laegsgaard 62 (35); Martin Dale-Bradley 2/35 (4 overs); Charlie Forshaw 2/35 (4 overs)		Matthew Stokes 67* (44); Surya Anand 1/23 (3 overs)

Guernsey won by 6 wickets
King George V Sports Ground, Castel
Umpires: Azam Baig (Ire) and Anna Harris (Eng)
Player of the match: Matthew Stokes (Gue)

- Guernsey won the toss and elected to field.
