= Gavin George =

- Born: Gavin George; May 10, 2003 (age 23); Westerville, Ohio
- Origin: Granville, Ohio, United States
- Genres: Classical
- Occupation: Pianist
- Instrument: Piano
- Years active: 2009–present
- Website: www.gavingeorge.com

Gavin George (born May 10, 2003) is an American classical pianist.

== Early life and education ==
Gavin George was born on May 10, 2003, in Westerville, Ohio. He is the elder of two children to his father Eric and mother Mary George. George's love for music became evident by the age of two, and he began formal piano instruction at the age of three. George is currently a student of Ran Dank, and previously studied with Antonio Pompa-Baldi.

== Career ==
Gavin George made his orchestral debut in 2010 at age seven with the Newark-Granville Symphony Orchestra. As a gold-medal winner for the two consecutive years of 2010 and 2011 in the American Association for the Development of the Gifted and Talented International Piano Competition, he performed two times in Carnegie Hall and was awarded a full scholarship to study and perform in the Vianden Music Festival in Luxembourg.

George appeared as a featured performer on the CBS Early Show in 2010 and the Queen Latifah Show in 2013. In 2011, he became the youngest person to perform on the Emmy award-winning show From the Top, which was broadcast on NPR. In 2012, he was awarded first prize in the Suzuki Association of the Americas International Piano Concerto Competition. The same year he was selected as one of the PRODIGIES series documentary profiles made by RadicalMedia, appearing on the YouTube THNKRTV channel.

From 2010 to 2016, George had orchestral performances throughout the United States as well as in Italy. Among the concertos he performed are Haydn Piano Concerto No. 11, Beethoven Piano Concerto No. 3, Mendelssohn Piano Concerto No. 1, Rachmaninoff Piano Concerto No. 1, and Mozart Piano Concerto No. 5. During this time, his recital and orchestral performance venues included Sorrento, Italy; Perugia, Italy; Vianden, Luxembourg; Constitution Hall, Washington, D.C.; Carnegie Hall, New York; Severance Hall, Ohio; Gartner Auditorium, Ohio; Ocean Reef Cultural Center, Florida; Xavier University, Ohio; The Balboa Theatre, California; Orchestral Hall, Minnesota; Denison University, Ohio; and Midland Theatre, Ohio.
