= List of Seychelles Twenty20 International cricketers =

This is a list of Seychelles Twenty20 International cricketers.

In April 2018, the ICC decided to grant full Twenty20 International (T20I) status to all its members. Therefore, all Twenty20 matches played between Seychelles and other ICC members after 1 January 2019 will be eligible for T20I status. Seychelles will play their first T20I against Ghana on 16 October 2021 during the 2021 ICC Men's T20 World Cup Africa Qualifier.

This list comprises all members of the Seychelles cricket team who have played at least one T20I match. It is initially arranged in the order in which each player won his first Twenty20 cap. Where more than one player won his first Twenty20 cap in the same match, those players are listed alphabetically by surname.

== Key ==
General

- ‡ – Captain
- † – Wicket-keeper
- First – Year of debut
- Last – Year of latest game
- Mat – Number of matches played

Batting

- Runs – Runs scored in career
- HS – Highest score
- Avg – Runs scored per dismissal
- * – Batsman remained not out
- 50 – Number of half centuries

Bowling

- Balls – Balls bowled in career
- Wkt – Wickets taken in career
- BBI – Best bowling in an innings
- Ave – Average runs per wicket

Fielding

- Ca – Catches taken
- St – Stumpings affected

== List of players ==
Statistics are correct as of 28 March 2026.

Seychelles T20I cricketers
General					Batting				Bowling				Fielding		Ref
No.	Name	First	Last	Mat	Runs	HS	Avg	50	Balls	Wkt	BBI	Ave	Ca	St	Ref
1	Deso Kalvin	2021	2026	15	81	30	9.00	0	97	2	2/19	80.00	1	0	
2	Naidoo Krishna‡	2021	2024	18	62	20	6.20	0	232	15	2/17	22.66	4	0	
3	Stephen Madusanka	2021	2024	18	286	50*	23.83	1	126	7	3/16	30.00	1	0	
4	Mazharul Islam†	2021	2026	22	354	50	20.82	2	83	4	2/17	24.50	4	0	
5	Shanmugasundram Mohan†	2021	2026	19	111	20	10.09	0	–	–	–	–	6	5	
6	Rao Nil	2021	2021	4	33	19	16.50	0	72	1	1/19	103.00	1	0	
7	Kaushalkumar Patel‡	2021	2021	6	8	8*	–	0	133	4	2/16	37.00	0	0	
8	Thiyagarajan Rajiv	2021	2021	6	75	36	15.00	0	6	0	–	–	0	0	
9	Sohail Rocket	2021	2026	16	18	5	2.25	0	264	11	2/23	30.45	0	0	
10	Sivakumar Udhayan	2021	2022	10	40	19	8.00	0	–	–	–	–	2	0	
11	Vadodariya Mukesh	2021	2022	8	19	9	3.80	0	84	2	2/44	60.50	0	0	
12	Kerai Govind	2021	2021	1	–	–	–	–	18	1	1/25	25.00	0	0	
13	Hirani Harji	2021	2026	9	21	14	3.50	0	150	6	3/21	32.16	0	0	
14	Paul Byron	2021	2021	1	0	0	0.00	0	–	–	–	–	0	0	
15	Rashen de Silva‡	2022	2026	16	207	51	18.81	1	104	3	1/10	52.00	6	0	
16	Thiwanka Rajapaksha‡	2022	2026	16	210	49	14.00	0	96	3	1/5	45.66	1	0	
17	Samarathunga Rukmal	2022	2026	16	9	5*	3.00	0	282	08	3/12	40.37	6	0	
18	Tharmenthiran Shanmugam	2022	2022	6	13	8*	13.00	0	66	1	1/22	68.00	0	0	
19	Pednekar Abhijit†	2022	2022	3	5	5	2.50	0	–	–	–	–	0	0	
20	Harsha Madhushanka	2024	2024	2	0	0	0.00	0	18	0	–	–	1	0	
21	Manikandan Mariyappan	2024	2026	6	23	16	3.83	0	–	–	–	–	4	0	
22	Tim Horpinitch‡	2024	2024	4	34	13	8.50	0	–	–	–	–	2	0	
23	Jobayer Hossen	2024	2026	8	57	26	14.25	0	150	10	5/25	18.10	0	0	
24	Nagarajan Gnanapragasam	2024	2026	2	1	1	0.50	0	24	0	–	–	2	0	
25	Mohomed Saddam	2026	2026	3	2	2	1.00	0	–	–	–	–	0	0	
26	Thilina Silva	2026	2026	4	14	12	14.00	0	84	5	2/28	15.20	0	0	
27	Manisankar Viswanathan	2026	2026	2	0	0	0.00	0	–	–	–	–	0	0	
28	Santosh Pillay	2026	2026	1	11	11	11.00	0	–	–	–	–	0	0	
