= 2024 Men's T20 World Cup Europe Sub-regional Qualifier A =

Qualification tournament for the 2026 T20WC in Europe region

2024 ICC Men's T20 World Cup Europe Sub-regional Qualifier A
- Dates: 9 – 16 June 2024
- Administrator: ICC Europe
- Cricket format: Twenty20 International
- Tournament format(s): Group stage and Knockouts
- Host: Italy
- Champions: Italy
- Runners-up: Romania
- Participants: 10
- Matches: 24
- Player of the series: (Italy) Harry Manenti
- Most runs: (Austria) Karanbir Singh (225)
- Most wickets: (Italy) Crishan Kalugamage (10) (Israel) Josh Evans (10) (Luxembourg) Vikram Vijh (10)

The 2024 ICC Men's T20 World Cup Europe Sub-regional Qualifier A was a cricket tournament that formed part of the qualification process for the 2026 Men's T20 World Cup. It was hosted by Italy in June 2024.

The winners of the tournament, Italy advanced to the regional final, where they will be joined by Netherlands and Scotland who were given a bye after having participated in the previous T20 World Cup, and two other teams from sub-regional qualifiers B and C.

== Squads ==
Austria	France	Hungary	Isle of Man	Israel
Aqib Iqbal (c); Abdullah Akbarjan; Zeshan Arif; Imran Asif; Abrar Bilal (wk); Itibarshah Deedar; Baseer Khan; Shadnan Khan; Amir Naeem (wk); Armaan Randhawa; Karanbir Singh; Adeel Tariq; Bilal Zalmai; Waqar Zalmai	Gustav McKeon (c); Zain Ahmad; Dawood Ahmadzai; Kamran Ahmadzai; Noman Amjad; Lingeswaran Canessane; Mukhtar Ghulami; Ikbal Hossain; Hevit Jackson (wk); Usman Khan; Hamza Niaz; Christian Roberts; Sajad Stanikzay; Zaheer Zahiri	Vinoth Ravindran (c); Abhijeet Ahuja; Abhishek Ahuja (wk); Danyal Akbar (wk); Muhammad Burhan; Ali Farasat; Mark Fontaine; Abbas Ghani; Amal Jacob; Harshvardhan Mandhyan; Sandeep Mohandas; Sheikh Rasik; Kamran Wahid; Ali Yalmaz	Oliver Webster (c); Matthew Ansell; Samuel Barnett; Edward Beard; George Burrows; Joseph Burrows; Kieran Cawte; Spencer Clarke; Carl Hartmann (wk); Chris Langford; Corbin Liebenberg; Harry McAleer (wk); Adam McAuley; Luke Ward	Eshkol Solomon (c); Josh Evans (vc); Shailesh Bangera (wk); Eyal Bhonkar; Yarden Divekar; Tomer Kahamker; Virendra Kumar; Niv Nagavkar; Yair Nagavkar; Yogev Nagavkar; Warna Narayana; Prathapa Siriwardhana (wk); Elan Talker; Aviel Warsulkar
Italy	Luxembourg	Portugal	Romania	Turkey
Gareth Berg (c); Zain Ali; Joe Burns; Marcus Campopiano; Stefano di Bartolomeo; Thomas Draca; Crishan Kalugamage; Damith Kosala; Harry Manenti; Gian-Piero Meade (wk); Anthony Mosca; Justin Mosca; Syed Naqvi; Jaspreet Singh; ~~Aidan Wheeler~~	Joost Mees (c, wk); James Barker; Timothy Barker; Marcus Cope; William Cope; Shiv Gill; Saransh Kulshrestha; Pankaj Malav; Advyth Manepalli (wk); Thomas Martin; Milad Momand; Ankush Nanda; Anoop Orsu; Vikram Vijh	Najjam Shahzad (c); Azhar Andani; Syed Maisam Ali; Anthony Chambers; Suman Ghimire; Adnan Gondal; Juan Henri; Siraj Ullah Khadem; Junaid Khan; Miguel Machado; Amandeep Singh; Francoise Stoman (wk); Jalpesh Vijay; Amir Zaib	Vasu Saini (c); Shantanu Vashist (vc); Ravindra Athapaththu; Pratham Hingorani; Ali Hussain; Rameez Khan; Manmeet Koli; Adrian Lascu; Muhammad Moiz; Satwik Nadigotla (wk); Luca Petre; Anand Rajashekara (wk); Taranjeet Singh; Cosmin Zavoiu	Gokhan Alta (c); Ali Turkmen (vc); Ilyas Ataullah; Muhammed Bicer; Serdar Burak Emir; Zafer Durmaz; Shamsullah Ehsan; Ishak Elec; Abdullah Khan Lodhi (wk); Ibrahim Kursad Dalyan; Romeo Nath; Mecit Ozturk; Tunahan Turan; Muhammed Turkmen

== Group stage ==
=== Group A ===
Group A standings
Pos	Team	Pld	W	L	NR	Pts	NRR	Qualification
1	Italy (H)	4	4	0	0	8	2.429	Advanced to the final
2	France	4	3	1	0	6	0.702	Advanced to the 3rd place play-off
3	Isle of Man	4	2	2	0	4	1.180	Advanced to the 5th place play-off
4	Luxembourg	4	1	3	0	2	−1.000	Advanced to the 7th place play-off
5	Turkey	4	0	4	0	0	−3.308	Eliminated

Source: ESPNcricinfo
(H) Host

9 June 2024
10:15
Scorecard

Italy; 166/7 (20 overs)	v	Luxembourg; 89/9 (20 overs)
Joe Burns 58 (42); Vikram Vijh 2/35 (4 overs)		Timothy Barker 27 (31); Gareth Berg 3/16 (4 overs)

Italy won by 77 runs
Roma Cricket Ground, Rome
Umpires: Adeel Ashiq (Ita) and Jesper Jensen (Den)
Player of the match: Harry Manenti (Ita)

- Luxembourg won the toss and elected to field.
- Zain Ali, Joe Burns and Thomas Draca (Ita) all made their T20I debuts.

9 June 2024
15:15
Scorecard

France; 149/8 (20 overs)	v	Isle of Man; 133/6 (20 overs)
Gustav McKeon 34 (26); Ollie Webster 3/33 (4 overs)		George Burrows 40 (34); Usman Khan 3/39 (4 overs)

France won by 16 runs
Roma Cricket Ground, Rome
Umpires: Jesper Jensen (Den) and Iain McDonald (Sco)
Player of the match: Usman Khan (Fra)

- Isle of Man won the toss and elected to field.
- Harry McAleer and Samuel Barnett (IoM) both made their T20I debuts.

10 June 2024
10:15
Scorecard

Isle of Man; 182/7 (20 overs)	v	Turkey; 101/9 (20 overs)
George Burrows 52 (43); Mecit Ozturk 2/38 (4 overs)		Abdullah Khan Lodhi 30 (30); Joseph Burrows 3/10 (4 overs)

Isle of Man won by 81 runs
Simar Cricket Ground, Rome
Umpires: Jesper Jensen (Den) and Martin Saggers (Eng)
Player of the match: Joseph Burrows (IoM)

- Turkey won the toss and elected to field.
- Ibrahim Kursad Dalyan and Abdullah Khan Lodhi (Tur) both made their T20I debuts.

10 June 2024
15:15
Scorecard

France; 116 (20 overs)	v	Italy; 118/5 (18.2 overs)
Hamza Niaz 28 (18); Crishan Kalugamage 4/17 (4 overs)		Harry Manenti 65 (51); Zaheer Zahiri 2/11 (3 overs)

Italy won by 5 wickets
Simar Cricket Ground, Rome
Umpires: Jesper Jensen (Den) and Pim van Liemt (Ned)
Player of the match: Harry Manenti (Ita)

- Italy won the toss and elected to field.

12 June 2024
10:15
Scorecard

Isle of Man; 85 (17.5 overs)	v	Italy; 87/3 (14.3 overs)
Oliver Webster 21 (10); Jaspreet Singh 4/9 (3.5 overs)		Harry Manenti 31 (30); Chris Langford 2/10 (3 overs)

Italy won by 7 wickets
Roma Cricket Ground, Rome
Umpires: Mark Jameson (Ger) and Pim van Liemt (Ned)
Player of the match: Thomas Draca (Ita)

- Isle of Man won the toss and elected to bat.
- Spencer Clarke (IoM) made his T20I debut.

12 June 2024
15:15
Scorecard

Luxembourg; 147/9 (20 overs)	v	Turkey; 74 (15.5 overs)
Timothy Barker 59 (40); Gokhan Alta 3/25 (4 overs)		Abdullah Khan Lodhi 36 (41); Vikram Vijh 3/9 (2.5 overs)

Luxembourg won by 73 runs
Roma Cricket Ground, Rome
Umpires: Adeel Ashiq (Ita) and Pim van Liemt (Ned)
Player of the match: Timothy Barker (Lux)

- Turkey won the toss and elected to field.

13 June 2024
10:15
Scorecard

France; 145/6 (20 overs)	v	Luxembourg; 132/6 (20 overs)
Christian Roberts 50* (38); Vikram Vijh 2/23 (4 overs)		Shiv Gill 36 (42); Usman Khan 2/16 (4 overs)

France won by 13 runs
Simar Cricket Ground, Rome
Umpires: Mark Jameson (Ger) and Jesper Jensen (Den)
Player of the match: Christian Roberts (Fra)

- France won the toss and elected to bat.

13 June 2024
15:15
Scorecard

Turkey; 86 (19.3 overs)	v	Italy; 90/1 (11.5 overs)
Shamsullah Ehsan 39 (39); Zain Ali 3/16 (4 overs); Damith Kosala 3/16 (4 overs)		Justin Mosca 51* (33); Ibrahim Kursad Dalyan 1/20 (2 overs)

Italy won by 9 wickets
Simar Cricket Ground, Rome
Umpires: Mark Jameson (Ger) and Iain McDonald (Sco)
Player of the match: Justin Mosca (Ita)

- Turkey won the toss and elected to bat.

15 June 2024
10:15
Scorecard

Isle of Man; 154/8 (20 overs)	v	Luxembourg; 91 (14.3 overs)
Oliver Webster 38 (37); Pankaj Malav 3/26 (4 overs)		Joost Mees 31 (22); Chris Langford 3/13 (2.3 overs)

Isle of Man won by 63 runs
Roma Cricket Ground, Rome
Umpires: Mark Jameson (Ger) and Iain McDonald (Sco)
Player of the match: Chris Langford (IoM)

- Isle of Man won the toss and elected to bat.

15 June 2024
15:15
Scorecard

France; 167/6 (20 overs)	v	Turkey; 127 (19.3 overs)
Zain Ahmad 52 (38); Gokhan Alta 3/34 (4 overs)		Romeo Nath 28 (26); Kamran Ahmadzai 4/12 (3 overs)

France won by 40 runs
Roma Cricket Ground, Rome
Umpires: Jesper Jensen (Den) and Iain McDonald (Sco)
Player of the match: Kamran Ahmadzai (Fra)

- Turkey won the toss and elected to field.
- Serdar Burak Emir (Tur) made his T20I debut.

=== Group B ===
Group B standings
Pos	Team	Pld	W	L	NR	Pts	NRR	Qualification
1	Romania	4	4	0	0	8	1.404	Advanced to the final
2	Austria	4	3	1	0	6	1.466	Advanced to the 3rd place play-off
3	Portugal	4	1	3	0	2	−0.493	Advanced to the 5th place play-off
4	Israel	4	1	3	0	2	−0.984	Advanced to the 7th place play-off
5	Hungary	4	1	3	0	2	−1.075	Eliminated

Source: ESPNcricinfo

9 June 2024
10:15
Scorecard

Portugal; 147/9 (20 overs)	v	Hungary; 132/5 (20 overs)
Jalpesh Vijay 42 (33); Sheikh Rasik 3/25 (4 overs)		Vinoth Ravindran 57 (46); Siraj Ullah Khadem 2/20 (4 overs)

Portugal won by 15 runs
Simar Cricket Ground, Rome
Umpires: Mark Jameson (Ger) and Pim van Liemt (Ned)
Player of the match: Vinoth Ravindran (Hun)

- Hungary won the toss and elected to field.
- Danyal Akbar, Muhammad Burhan, Amal Jacob, Kamran Wahid (Hun), Juan Henri and Jalpesh Vijay (Por) all made their T20I debuts.

9 June 2024
15:15
Scorecard

Austria; 169 (19.4 overs)	v	Romania; 170/7 (19.2 overs)
Karanbir Singh 97 (57); Manmeet Koli 2/26 (4 overs)		Vasu Saini 64 (45); Waqar Zalmai 3/40 (4 overs)

Romania won by 3 wickets
Simar Cricket Ground, Rome
Umpires: Martin Saggers (Eng) and Pim van Liemt (Ned)
Player of the match: Vasu Saini (Rom)

- Austria won the toss and elected to bat.
- Ali Hussain, Rameez Khan and Adrian Lascu (Rom) all made their T20I debuts.

10 June 2024
10:15
Scorecard

Israel; 107/9 (20 overs)	v	Austria; 110/3 (13.1 overs)
Josh Evans 42 (37); Waqar Zalmai 3/11 (4 overs)		Aqib Iqbal 52* (35); Niv Nagavkar 1/9 (2 overs)

Austria won by 7 wickets
Roma Cricket Ground, Rome
Umpires: Adeel Ashiq (Ita) and Iain McDonald (Sco)
Player of the match: Aqib Iqbal (Aut)

- Israel won the toss and elected to bat.
- Eyal Bhonkar, Yarden Divekar, Virendra Kumar, Warna Narayana and Prathapa Siriwardhana (Isr) all made their T20I debuts.

10 June 2024
15:15
Scorecard

Portugal; 142 (19.5 overs)	v	Romania; 146/4 (18.3 overs)
Azhar Andani 29 (35); Adrian Lascu 5/21 (4 overs)		Taranjeet Singh 62 (43); Juan Henri 2/35 (4 overs)

Romania won by 6 wickets
Roma Cricket Ground, Rome
Umpires: Adeel Ashiq (Ita) and Mark Jameson (Ger)
Player of the match: Adrian Lascu (Rom)

- Portugal won the toss and elected to bat.
- Adrian Lascu (Rom) took his first five-wicket haul in T20Is.

12 June 2024
10:15
Scorecard

Portugal; 125/9 (20 overs)	v	Austria; 128/3 (15 overs)
Suman Ghimire 53* (43); Abdullah Akbarjan 4/11 (3 overs)		Karanbir Singh 51 (31); Syed Maisam Ali 2/25 (3 overs)

Austria won by 7 wickets
Simar Cricket Ground, Rome
Umpires: Iain McDonald (Sco) and Martin Saggers (Eng)
Player of the match: Karanbir Singh (Aut)

- Portugal won the toss and elected to bat.

12 June 2024
15:15
Scorecard

Israel; 122/8 (20 overs)	v	Hungary; 123/9 (19.2 overs)
Eshkol Solomon 40 (38); Muhammad Burhan 4/25 (4 overs)		Abbas Ghani 36 (29); Josh Evans 3/12 (4 overs)

Hungary won by 1 wicket
Simar Cricket Ground, Rome
Umpires: Jesper Jensen (Den) and Martin Saggers (Eng)
Player of the match: Muhammad Burhan (Hun)

- Israel won the toss and elected to bat.
- Aviel Warsulkar (Isr) made his T20I debut.

13 June 2024
10:15
Scorecard

Hungary; 110 (18.2 overs)	v	Romania; 111/2 (12.1 overs)
Vinoth Ravindran 35 (24); Manmeet Koli 5/28 (4 overs)		Adrian Lascu 72* (38); Sheikh Rasik 2/24 (3 overs)

Romania won by 8 wickets
Roma Cricket Ground, Rome
Umpires: Adeel Ashiq (Ita) and Pim van Liemt (Ned)
Player of the match: Manmeet Koli (Rom)

- Romania won the toss and elected to field.
- Manmeet Koli (Rom) took his first five-wicket haul in T20Is.

13 June 2024
15:15
Scorecard

Portugal; 118/6 (20 overs)	v	Israel; 119/8 (20 overs)
Suman Ghimire 36 (29); Josh Evans 4/20 (4 overs)		Yair Nagavkar 32* (30); Najjam Shahzad 2/11 (4 overs)

Israel won by 2 wickets
Roma Cricket Ground, Rome
Umpires: Adeel Ashiq (Ita) and Martin Saggers (Eng)
Player of the match: Josh Evans (Isr)

- Portugal won the toss and elected to bat.
- Adnan Gondal (Por) made his T20I debut.

15 June 2024
10:15
Scorecard

Austria; 187/7 (20 overs)	v	Hungary; 173/9 (20 overs)
Bilal Zalmai 55 (29); Kamran Wahid 2/34 (3 overs)		Sheikh Rasik 51 (30); Imran Asif 2/20 (3 overs)

Austria won by 14 runs
Simar Cricket Ground, Rome
Umpires: Pim van Liemt (Ned) and Martin Saggers (Eng)
Player of the match: Bilal Zalmai (Aut)

- Hungary won the toss and elected to field.

15 June 2024
15:15
Scorecard

Romania; 149/7 (20 overs)	v	Israel; 125/7 (20 overs)
Taranjeet Singh 35 (22); Virendra Kumar 2/20 (3 overs)		Eshkol Solomon 26* (23); Muhammad Moiz 3/26 (4 overs)

Romania won by 24 runs
Simar Cricket Ground, Rome
Umpires: Adeel Ashiq (Ita) and Martin Saggers (Eng)
Player of the match: Taranjeet Singh (Rom)

- Israel won the toss and elected to field.

== Play-offs ==
=== 7th place play-off ===
16 June 2024
10:15
Scorecard

Luxembourg; 172/6 (20 overs)	v	Israel; 175/8 (19.5 overs)
Shiv Gill 57 (48); Tomer Kahamker 2/30 (4 overs)		Eshkol Solomon 59* (46); Shiv Gill 2/20 (3.5 overs)

Israel won by 2 wickets
Roma Cricket Ground, Rome
Umpires: Iain McDonald (Sco) and Pim van Liemt (Ned)
Player of the match: Eshkol Solomon (Isr)

- Luxembourg won the toss and elected to bat.

=== 5th place play-off ===
16 June 2024
15:15
Scorecard

Portugal; 174/4 (20 overs)	v	Isle of Man; 86 (13.5 overs)
Amir Zaib 45* (22); Joe Burrows 2/21 (4 overs)		Carl Hartmann 20 (16); Syed Maisam Ali 4/14 (3 overs)

Portugal won by 88 runs
Roma Cricket Ground, Rome
Umpires: Jesper Jensen (Den) and Iain McDonald (Sco)
Player of the match: Amandeep Singh (Por)

- Portugal won the toss and elected to bat.

=== 3rd place play-off ===
16 June 2024
10:15
Scorecard

France; 122/8 (20 overs)	v	Austria; 123/4 (18 overs)
Christian Roberts 48 (41); Bilal Zalmai 2/19 (4 overs)		Bilal Zalmai 71* (37); Sajad Stanikzay 2/24 (3 overs)

Austria won by 6 wickets
Simar Cricket Ground, Rome
Umpires: Adeel Ashiq (Ita) and Mark Jameson (Ger)
Player of the match: Bilal Zalmai (Aut)

- Austria won the toss and elected to field.

=== Final ===
16 June 2024
15:15
Scorecard

Italy; 244/4 (20 overs)	v	Romania; 84 (17.4 overs)
Joe Burns 108* (55); Pratham Hingorani 1/17 (2 overs)		Taranjeet Singh 31 (19); Crishan Kalugamage 3/12 (4 overs)

Italy won by 160 runs
Simar Cricket Ground, Rome
Umpires: Mark Jameson (Ger) and Martin Saggers (Eng)
Player of the match: Joe Burns (Ita)

- Romania won the toss and elected to field.
- Joe Burns became the first player for Italy to score a century in men's T20Is.
