= Nasir Ahmed (Bangladeshi cricketer) =

Bangladeshi cricketer (born 1964)

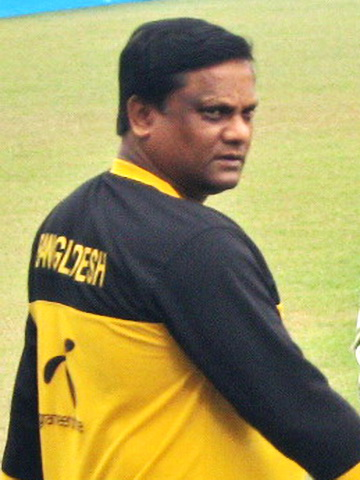

Personal information
- Born: 1 January 1964 (age 62); Dacca, East Pakistan (present-day Dhaka, Bangladesh)
- Batting: Right-handed
- Bowling: -

International information
- National side: Bangladesh
- ODI debut (cap 16): 27 October 1988 v India
- Last ODI: 31 December 1990 v Sri Lanka
- Source: CricInfo, 13 February 2006

Nasir Ahmed (born 1 January 1964) is a Bangladeshi former cricketer who played in seven One Day Internationals from 1988 to 1990. After the retirement of Shafiq-ul-Haq, the selectors tried a number of young keepers, and Nasir (commonly known as Nasu) emerged as the most competent one. After cementing his place in 1986, he was a regular in the national side until 1993.

He eventually lost his place mainly due to tactical reasons, not for any keeping deficiencies. With one day game becoming more and more competitive, the team required a wicketkeeper who can bat up the order. Other players fulfilled this criterion better than Nasu. After retiring from cricket as a player, Nasu continued to serve the game as a national selector.
