= Seychelles national cricket team =

Seychelles
- Association: Seychelles Cricket Association

Personnel
- Captain: Krishna Naidoo
- Coach: Aruna Hathurusinghe

International Cricket Council
- ICC status: Associate member (2017); Affiliate member (2011)
- ICC region: Africa
| ICC Rankings | Current | Best-ever |
| T20I | 88th | 65th (2 May 2022) |

International cricket
- First international: v Mali at Accra, Ghana; 24 February 2011

T20 Internationals
- First T20I: v Ghana at Gahanga International Cricket Stadium, Kigali; 16 October 2021
- Last T20I: v Malawi at Achimota Oval A, Accra; 28 March 2026
| T20Is | Played | Won/Lost |
| Total | 22 | 3/16 (0 ties, 3 no results) |
| This year | 4 | 1/3 (0 ties, 0 no results) |
T20I kit
- As of 28 March 2026

The Seychelles national cricket team represents the country of Seychelles in international cricket. The team is organised by the Seychelles Cricket Association (SCA) which became an affiliate member of the International Cricket Council (ICC) in 2010 and an associate member in 2017.

== History ==
Following the surrender of the Seychelles to the British Empire in the 1814 Treaty of Paris, then one can assume the game was played in some capacity in the 19th century. Following the independence of the Seychelles from the United Kingdom in 1979, the game on the islands went into decline.

Recently the game has seen an upsurge in popularity, mostly fuelled by expat communities on the island from cricket playing nations, but also involving local people. Until a few years ago the Seychelles played the Maldives and Maurindia of Mauritius in a triangular tournament.

In March 2010, SCA president Jonathon Paul declared the country's intention to apply for affiliate membership of the International Cricket Council (ICC). This was granted, with the Seychelles being recognised as the 105th member of the ICC. Shortly after becoming a member of the ICC, Paul announced plans to build an international standard cricket ground to encourage the growth of cricket in the Seychelles. Land on Perseverance Island was set aside for its construction.

Seychelles made its international debut at the 2011 ICC Africa Twenty20 Division Three tournament in Ghana. The team won its first three matches, against Mali, Gambia and Morocco, ultimately losing to Rwanda by eight runs in the tournament final. Seychelles finished runner-up to Zambia at the 2012 ICC Africa Twenty20 Division Three tournament. The team was captained by Kaushal Patel and played eight matches in five days, winning six and losing two games, both to Zambia. They notably defended a total of 71 runs against Cameroon, winning by nine runs, and defeated Saint Helena in a super over with a six off the last ball.

In April 2018, the ICC decided to grant full Twenty20 International (T20I) status to all its members. Therefore, all Twenty20 matches played between the Seychelles and other ICC members after 1 January 2019 will be eligible for T20I status.

== Tournament history ==
=== T20 World Cup Africa Sub-Regional Qualifier ===
T20 World Cup Africa Qualifier record
| Year | Round | Position | GP | W | L | T | NR |
|---|---|---|---|---|---|---|---|
| (Rwanda) 2021 | Round-robin | 5/7 | 6 | 2 | 4 | 0 | 0 |
| (Rwanda) 2022 | Round-robin | 7/8 | 7 | 0 | 4 | 0 | 3 |
| (Kenya) 2024 | Round-robin | 5/6 | 5 | 1 | 4 | 0 | 0 |
| Total | Round-robin | 5th | 18 | 3 | 12 | 0 | 3 |

== Records and statistics ==
International Match Summary — Seychelles

Last updated 28 March 2026

Playing Record
| Format | M | W | L | T | NR | Inaugural Match |
| Twenty20 Internationals | 22 | 3 | 16 | 0 | 3 | 16 October 2021 |

=== Twenty20 International ===
- Highest team total: 162/3 v. Mali on 18 November 2022 at IPRC Cricket Ground, Kigali.
- Highest individual score: 59* Tim Horpinitch v Rwanda 28 April 2013 at Willowmore Park, Benoni
- Best individual bowling figures: 5/25- Jobayer Hossen v. Rwanda on 24 October 2024 at Ruaraka Ground, Nairobi

T20I record versus other nations

Records complete to T20I #3791. Last updated 28 March 2026.

| Opponent | M | W | L | T | NR | First match | First win |
|---|---|---|---|---|---|---|---|
vs Full Members
| Zimbabwe | 1 | 0 | 1 | 0 | 0 | 19 October 2024 | |
vs Associate Members
| Botswana | 1 | 0 | 0 | 0 | 1 | 17 November 2022 | |
| Eswatini | 1 | 1 | 0 | 0 | 0 | 20 October 2021 | 20 October 2021 |
| Ghana | 2 | 0 | 2 | 0 | 0 | 16 October 2021 | |
| Kenya | 3 | 0 | 3 | 0 | 0 | 25 November 2022 | |
| Lesotho | 2 | 1 | 1 | 0 | 0 | 17 October 2021 | 17 October 2021 |
| Malawi | 3 | 0 | 2 | 0 | 1 | 20 October 2021 | |
| Mali | 1 | 0 | 0 | 0 | 1 | 18 November 2022 | |
| Mozambique | 1 | 0 | 1 | 0 | 0 | 22 October 2024 | |
| Rwanda | 3 | 0 | 3 | 0 | 0 | 19 October 2021 | |
| Saint Helena | 2 | 1 | 1 | 0 | 0 | 21 November 2022 | 25 March 2026 |
| Tanzania | 1 | 0 | 1 | 0 | 0 | 27 March 2026 | |
| Uganda | 1 | 0 | 1 | 0 | 0 | 22 October 2021 | |

== See also ==
- List of Seychelles Twenty20 International cricketers
