= Mali national cricket team =

Mali
- Flag of the Malian Cricket Federation
- Association: Malian Cricket Federation

Personnel
- Captain: Cheick Amala Keita

International Cricket Council
- ICC status: Associate member (2017); Affiliate member (2005)
- ICC region: Africa
ICC Rankings	Current	Best-ever
T20I	97th	83th (1 May 2024)

International cricket
- First international: v. Seychelles at Accra, Ghana; 24 February 2011

T20 Internationals
- First T20I: v Lesotho at IPRC Cricket Ground, Kigali; 17 November 2022
- Last T20I: v Sierra Leone at Botswana Cricket Association Oval 1, Gaborone; 30 May 2026
T20Is	Played	Won/Lost
Total	21	1/18 (0 ties, 2 no results)
This year	6	1/5 (0 ties, 0 no results)
T20I home kit
T20I away kit
- As of 30 May 2026

The Mali national cricket team represents Mali in international cricket. The Malian Cricket Federation (FCM) became an affiliate member of the International Cricket Council (ICC) in 2005 and an associate member in 2017.

== History ==
In April 2018, the ICC decided to grant full Twenty20 International (T20I) status to all its members. Therefore, all Twenty20 matches played between Mali and other ICC members after 1 January 2019 have the T20I status.

Mali made their T20I debut against Lesotho at the 2022–23 ICC Men's T20 World Cup Africa Qualifier.

17 November 2022
09:30
Scorecard

Lesotho; 138/6 (20 overs)	v	Mali; 107 (17.5 overs)
Lerotholi Gabriel 45* (37); Theodore Macalou 2/13 (3 overs)		Cheick Keita 35 (28); Waseem Yaqoob 2/7 (3 overs)

Lesotho won by 31 runs
IPRC Cricket Ground, Kigali
Umpires: Rockie D'Mello (Ken) and Isaac Oyieko (Ken)
Player of the match: Lerotholi Gabriel (Les)

- Mali won the toss and elected to field.
- First ever T20I match for Mali.
- Mohamed Coulibaly, Mahamadou Diaby, Sekou Diaby, Moustapha Diakite, Mamadou Diawara, Sanze Kamate, Cheick Keita, Theodore Macalou, Lamissa Sanogo, Mamadou Sidibe and Daouda Traore (Mli) all made their T20I debuts.

Playing in the Qualifier A group, they failed to win any matches. Out of their 7 matches, they lost 5, with the other two ending in no-result.

Four years later, they finally won their first match in 18 attempts, defeating Ivory Coast at the 2028 ICC T20 World Cup Qualifiers.

25 May 2026
13:30
Scorecard

Ivory Coast; 78/5 (20 overs)	v	Mali; 79/4 (13.3 overs)
Kouakou Wilfried 18 (41); Akshaykumar Prajapati 2/14 (4 overs)		Theodore Macalou 28* (36); Mimi Alex 2/14 (4 overs)

Mali won by 6 wickets
Botswana Cricket Association Oval 1, Gaborone
Umpires: Ravi Angara (Bot) and Forster Mutizwa (Zim)
Player of the match: Theodore Macalou (Mli)

- Mali won the toss and elected to field.
- First T20I win for Mali.

== Records and statistics ==
International Match Summary — Mali

Last updated 30 May 2026

Playing Record
Format	M	W	L	T	NR	Inaugural Match
Twenty20 Internationals	21	1	18	0	2	17 November 2022

=== Twenty20 International ===
T20I record versus other nations

Records complete to T20I #3919. Last updated 30 May 2026.

Opponent	M	W	L	T	NR	First match	First win
vs Associate Members
Botswana	2	0	2	0	0	22 November 2022	
Cameroon	3	0	3	0	0	7 December 2023	
Ghana	1	0	1	0	0	26 September 2024	
Ivory Coast	1	1	0	0	0	25 May 2026	25 May 2026
Kenya	3	0	3	0	0	20 November 2022	
Lesotho	2	0	2	0	0	17 November 2022	
Malawi	2	0	2	0	0	21 November 2022	
Rwanda	2	0	2	0	0	24 November 2022	
Saint Helena	1	0	0	0	1	22 November 2022	
Seychelles	1	0	0	0	1	18 November 2022	
Sierra Leone	2	0	2	0	0	9 December 2023	
Tanzania	1	0	1	0	0	21 September 2024	

== See also ==
- List of Mali Twenty20 International cricketers
- Mali women's national cricket team
- Malian Cricket Federation
