= Saint Helena national cricket team =

Saint Helena
- Association: St Helena Cricket Association

Personnel
- Captain: Scott Crowie

International Cricket Council
- ICC status: Associate member (2017)
- ICC region: Africa
ICC Rankings	Current	Best-ever
T20I	90th	70th (2-May-2021)

International cricket
- First international: 25 April 2012 v Cameroon (won by 9 wickets)

T20 Internationals
- First T20I: v Kenya at Gahanga International Cricket Stadium, Kigali; 17 November 2022
- Last T20I: v Tanzania at Achimota Oval B, Accra; 28 March 2026
T20Is	Played	Won/Lost
Total	16	3/11 (0 ties, 2 no results)
This year	4	0/4 (0 ties, 0 no results)
T20I kit
- As of 28 March 2026

The St Helena cricket team represents the small and remote British Overseas Territory of St Helena in international cricket. It is organised by the St Helena Cricket Association (SHCA), which joined the International Cricket Council (ICC) in 2001 as an affiliate member and became an associate member in 2017. The SHCA is also a member of the Africa Cricket Association (ACA). The team made its international debut in 2012.

== History ==
In April 2012, St Helena competed in its first international tournament, the ICC Africa Division 3 T20 Tournament. It was held in South Africa where St Helena beat Mali, Gambia, Cameroon and Morocco. They finished in the fifth place out of eight teams. The team had to raise £24,000 to travel to South Africa, making a five-day sea trip aboard RMS St Helena (1989) as the island did not have an airport at the time.

In April 2018, they were drawn in the Southern sub-region group in the 2018 ICC World Twenty20 African Sub Regional Qualifier tournament. Later the same month, the ICC decided to grant full Twenty20 International (T20I) status to all its members. Therefore, all Twenty20 matches played between St Helena and other ICC members after 1 January 2019 were full T20Is. St Helena won their first three matches in the Sub Regional Qualifier, recording victories against Eswatini, Malawi and Lesotho. They finished the tournament in third place but failed to reach the Regional Finals.

St Helena was drawn in Qualifier A in the African qualification for the 2024 T20 World Cup, facing seven teams in Rwanda in November 2022. The team and support staff were given free airfares on Airlink, the only airline flying to the island.

== Records and statistics ==
International Match Summary — Saint Helena

Last updated 28 March 2026

Playing Record
Format	M	W	L	T	NR	Inaugural Match
Twenty20 Internationals	16	3	11	0	2	17 November 2022

=== Twenty20 International ===
T20I record versus other nations

Records complete to T20I #3790. Last updated 28 March 2026.

Opponent	M	W	L	T	NR	First match	First win
vs Associate Members
Botswana	2	0	2	0	0	25 November 2022	
Eswatini	2	0	2	0	0	24 November 2024	
Ghana	1	0	1	0	0	27 March 2026	
Ivory Coast	1	1	0	0	0	28 November 2024	28 November 2024
Kenya	1	0	0	0	1	17 November 2022	
Lesotho	1	1	0	0	0	22 November 2022	22 November 2022
Malawi	1	0	1	0	0	24 November 2022	
Mali	1	0	0	0	1	22 November 2022	
Nigeria	1	0	1	0	0	23 November 2024	
Rwanda	1	0	1	0	0	18 November 2022	
Seychelles	2	1	1	0	0	21 November 2022	21 November 2022
Sierra Leone	1	0	1	0	0	26 November 2024	
Tanzania	1	0	1	0	0	28 March 2026	

== See also ==
- List of Saint Helena Twenty20 International cricketers
