= 2011 Africa Twenty20 Division One =

2011 ICC Africa Twenty20 Division One
- Administrator: International Cricket Council
- Cricket format: Twenty20
- Tournament format: Round-robin
- Host: Uganda
- Champions: Uganda
- Participants: 5
- Matches: 22
- Player of the series: Louis van der Westhuizen
- Most runs: (Namibia) Louis van der Westhuizen (406)
- Most wickets: (Uganda) Deusdedit Muhumuza (18)
- Official website: ICC Africa Region

The 2011 ICC Africa Twenty20 Division One was an international Twenty20 cricket tournament that took place between 9–15 July 2011. It was the inaugural edition of the ICC Africa Twenty20 Championship's Division One. Uganda hosted the event, with all matches played in the capital, Kampala.

== Teams ==
Teams that qualified are as follows:

- Ghana
- Kenya
- Namibia
- Nigeria
- Uganda

== Squads ==
Ghana	Kenya	Namibia	Nigeria	Uganda
Peter Ananya (c); Isaac Aboagye; Moses Anafie; Lawrence Ateak; Vincent Ateak; Samson Awiah; Kofi Bagabena; Francis Bakiweyem; Mark Bawa; Matthew Bawa; Obed Harvey; Julius Mensah (wk); Abdul-Karim Sumaila; James Vifah	Kennedy Ochieng (c) and (wk); Duncan Allan; Harrison Angila; Jignesh Hirani; Irfan Karim; Martin Ndandason; Joseph Ochieng; Rushab Patel; Emmanuel Ringera; Raj Savala; Raj Shikotra; Vinit Shikotra; Siddhant Taneja; Rahul Vishram	Craig Williams (c); Stephen Baard; Sarel Burger; Zhivago Groenewald; Louis Klazinga; Norbert Manyande; Gerhard Rudolph; Nicholaas Scholtz; Gerrie Snyman; Louis van der Westhuizen; Raymond van Schoor (wk); Wian van Vuuren; Christi Viljoen; Pikky Ya France	Endurance Ofem (c); Kunle Adegbola; Saheed Akolade; Olalekan Awolowo; Olajide Bejide; Ramit Gill; Joshua Ogunlola; Akabogu Okwudili; Segun Olayinka; Temitope Olayinka; Oluseye Olympio; Ademola Onikoyi (wk); Adeleke Oyede; Yashpal Sharma	Davis Arinaitwe (c); Abdulah Lubega; Arthur Kyobe; Brian Masaba; Deusdedit Muhumuza; Roger Mukasa; Benjamin Musoke; Frank Nsubuga; Lawrence Sematimba (wk); Henry Senyondo; Ronald Ssemanda; Ivan Thawithemwira; Charles Waiswa; Arthur Ziraba

== Fixtures ==
=== Group stage ===
==== Points Table ====
Team	P	W	L	T	NR	Points	NRR
Namibia	8	8	0	0	0	16	+5.472
Uganda	8	6	2	0	0	12	+0.636
Nigeria	8	3	5	0	0	6	–1.134
Kenya	8	2	6	0	0	4	–2.300
Ghana	8	1	7	0	0	2	–2.554

==== Matches ====
9 July
9.00 a.m.
Scorecard

Ghana; 101/8 (20 overs)	v	Uganda; 102/6 (19.5 overs)
Obed Harvey 36 (37); Brian Masaba 3/18 (4 overs)		Benjamin Musoke 26 (30); Vincent Ateak 2/1 (4 overs)

Uganda won by 4 wickets
Lugogo Cricket Oval, Kampala
Umpires: Jeff Luck (Nam) and Isaac Oyieko (Ken)

- Ghana won the toss and elected to bat.

9 July
9.00 a.m.
Scorecard

Namibia; 232/6 (20 overs)	v	Nigeria; 100/6 (20 overs)
Craig Williams 92 (42); Endurance Ofem 3/39 (4 overs)		Kunle Adegbola 40* (40); Christi Viljoen 1/2 (0.4 overs)

Namibia won by 132 runs
Kyambogo Cricket Ground, Kampala
Umpires: Rockie D'Mello (Ken) and Patric Makumbi (Uga)
Player of the match: Craig Williams (Nam)

- Namibia won the toss and elected to bat.

9 July
2.00 p.m.
Scorecard

Ghana; 140/7 (20 overs)	v	Kenya; 143/5 (19.5 overs)
Lawrence Ateak 36* (24); Joseph Ochieng 2/21 (3 overs)		Duncan Allan 37 (31); Moses Anafie 1/17 (4 overs)

Kenya won by 5 wickets
Lugogo Cricket Oval, Kampala
Umpires: Wynand Louw (Nam) and Jeff Luck (Nam)

- Ghana won the toss and elected to bat.

9 July
3.00 p.m.
Scorecard

Namibia; 162/5 (20 overs)	v	Uganda; 103/8 (20 overs)
Gerrie Snyman 41 (32); Deusdedit Muhumuza 2/36 (4 overs)		Benjamin Musoke 24 (39); Pikky Ya France 2/12 (3 overs)

Namibia won by 59 runs
Kyambogo Cricket Ground, Kampala
Umpires: Lalji Bhudia (Ken) and Rockie D'Mello (Ken)
Player of the match: Gerrie Snyman (Nam)

- Namibia won the toss and elected to bat.

10 July
9.00 a.m.
Scorecard

Ghana; 81/9 (20 overs)	v	Namibia; 255/2 (20 overs)
Obed Harvey 31 (44); Sarel Burger 3/12 (4 overs)		Louis van der Westhuizen 97 (40); Isaac Aboagye 1/33 (2 overs)

Namibia won by 174 runs
Lugogo Cricket Oval, Kampala
Umpires: Lalji Bhudia (Ken) and Isaac Oyieko (Ken)
Player of the match: Sarel Burger (Nam)

- Namibia won the toss and elected to bat.

10 July
9.00 a.m.
Scorecard

Kenya; 128/6 (20 overs)	v	Nigeria; 129/2 (17.2 overs)
Duncan Allan 41 (31); Ramit Gill 3/8 (4 overs)		Ademola Onikoyi 35 (29); Raj Savala 1/18 (4 overs)

Nigeria won by 8 wickets
Kyambogo Cricket Ground, Kampala
Umpires: Wynand Louw (Nam) and Patric Makumbi (Uga)
Player of the match: Ramit Gill (Ngr)

- Nigeria won the toss and elected to field.

10 July
2.00 p.m.
Scorecard

Kenya; 105/8 (20 overs)	v	Namibia; 108/2 (12.1 overs)
Duncan Allan 58 (49); Louis van der Westhuizen 3/12 (4 overs)		Craig Williams 70* (41); Raj Savala 1/28 (4 overs)

Namibia won by 8 wickets
Lugogo Cricket Oval, Kampala
Umpires: Lalji Bhujia (Ken) and Jeff Luck (Nam)
Player of the match: Craig Williams (Nam)

- Kenya won the toss and elected to bat.

10 July
2.00 p.m.
Scorecard

Nigeria; 104/6 (20 overs)	v	Uganda; 108/8 (18.1 overs)
Kunle Adegbola 36 (41); Frank Nsubuga 4 (9)		Arthur Ziraba 48 (50); Adeleke Oyede 3/9 (2.1 overs)

Uganda won by 2 wickets
Kyambogo Cricket Ground, Kampala
Umpires: Rockie D'Mello (Ken) and Wynand Louw (Nam)
Player of the match: Arthur Ziraba (Uga)

- Nigeria won the toss and elected to bat.

11 July
9.00 a.m.
Scorecard

Ghana; 129 (20 overs)	v	Nigeria; 126 (19.5 overs)
Peter Ananya 34 (28); Olalekan Awolowo 3/24 (4 overs)		Olajide Bejide 59 (41); Isaac Aboagye 2/24 (4 overs)

Ghana won by 3 runs
Lugogo Cricket Oval, Kampala
Umpires: Rickie D'Mello (Ken) and Wynand Louw (Nam)
Player of the match: Peter Ananya (Gha)

- Nigeria won the toss and elected to field.

11 July
9.00 a.m.
Scorecard

Uganda; 177/0 (20 overs)	v	Kenya; 102 (19.2 overs)
Roger Mukasa 101* (63)		Irfan Karim 26 (34); Brian Masaba 2/15 (4 overs)

Uganda won by 75 runs
Kyambogo Cricket Ground, Kampala
Umpires: Jeff Luck (Nam) and Patric Makumbi (Uga)
Player of the match: Roger Mukasa (Ken)

- Uganda won the toss and elected to bat.

12 July
9.00 a.m.
Scorecard

Nigeria; 88/7 (20 overs)	v	Namibia; 89/4 (12.3 overs)
Ramit Gill 20* (33); Pikky Ya France 2/11 (3 overs)		Craig Williams 34 (17); Endurance Ofem 2/18 (4 overs)

Namibia won by 6 wickets
Kyambogo Cricket Ground, Kampala
Umpires: Lalji Bhudia (Ken) and Isaac Oyieko (Ken)
Player of the match: Craig Williams (Nam)

- Nigeria won the toss and elected to bat.

12 July
9.00 a.m.
Scorecard

Uganda; 119/7 (20 overs)	v	Ghana; 83 (19.3 overs)
Frank Nsubuga 48* (29); Vincent Ateak 3/17 (4 overs)		Obed Harvey 29 (33); Deusdedit Muhumuza 5/17 (3.3 overs)

Uganda won by 36 runs
Lugogo Cricket Oval, Kampala
Umpires: Rockie D'Mello (Ken) and Jeff Luck (Nam)
Player of the match: Frank Nsubuga (Uga)

- Uganda won the toss and elected to bat.

12 July
2.00 p.m.
Scorecard

Ghana; 119/9 (20 overs)	v	Kenya; 123/5 (18.5 overs)
Obed Harvey 32 (30); Vinit Shikotra 3/29 (4 overs)		Duncan Allan 33 (36); Isaac Aboagye 2/25 (*4 overs)

Kenya won by 5 wickets
Kyambogo Cricket Ground, Kampala
Umpires: Wynand Louw (Nam) and Patric Makumbi (Uga)
Player of the match: Vinit Shikotra (Ken)

- Ghana won the toss and elected to bat.

12 July
2.00 p.m.
Scorecard

Namibia; 151/4 (20 overs)	v	Uganda; 132/7 (20 overs)
Sarel Burger 56* (53); Brian Masaba 2/41 (4 overs)		Arthur Ziraba 48 (44); Gerrie Snyman 3/20 (4 overs)

Namibia won by 19 runs
Lugogo Cricket Oval, Kampala
Umpires: Lalji Bhudia (Ken) and Isaac Oyieko (Ken)
Player of the match: Gerrie Snyman (Nam)

- Namibia won the toss and elected to bat.

13 July
9.00 a.m.
Scorecard

Namibia; 237/6 (20 overs)	v	Ghana; 77 (17.3 overs)
Craig Williams 86 (33); Peter Ananya 2/31 (4 overs)		Julius Mensah 14 (15); Sarel Burger 5/10 (*4 overs)

Namibia won by 160 runs
Lugogo Cricket Oval, Kampala
Umpires: Patric Makumbi (Uga) and Isaac Oyieko (Ken)
Player of the match: Sarel Burger (Nam)

- Namibia won the toss and elected to bat.

13 July
9.00 a.m.
Scorecard

Kenya; 107 (19.3 overs)	v	Nigeria; 111/7 (19.5 overs)
Duncan Allan 48 (34); Olalekan Awolowo 5/14 (4 overs)		Kunle Adegbola 36 (33); Vinit Shikotra 2/8 (4 overs)

Nigeria won by 3 wickets
Kyambogo Cricket Ground, Kampala
Umpires: Wynand Louw (Nam) and Jeff Luck
Player of the match: Olalekan Awolowo (Ngr)

- Nigeria won the toss and elected to field.

13 July
2.00 p.m.
Scorecard

Namibia; 262/1 (20 overs)	v	Kenya; 93/87 (20 overs)
Louis van der Westhuizen 159 (70); Raj Shikotra 1/46 (3 overs)		Duncan Allan 19 (22); Pikky Ya France 3/14 (4 overs)

Namibia won by 169 runs
Lugogo Cricket Oval, Kampala
Umpires: Rockie D'Mello (Ken) and Patric Makumbi (Uga)
Player of the match: Louis van der Westhuizen (Nam)

- Namibia won the toss and elected to bat.

13 July
2.00 p.m.
Scorecard

Nigeria; 112/8 (20 overs)	v	Uganda; 115/7 (18.2 overs)
Ademola Oniyoki 42 (53); Charles Waiswa 3/27 (4 overs)		Abdulah Lubega 23 (29); Kunle Adegbola 2/25 (3 overs)

Uganda won by 3 wickets
Kyambogo Cricket Ground, Kampala
Umpires: Lalji Bhudia (Ken) and Isaac Oyieko (Ken)
Player of the match: Charles Waiswa (Uga)

- Nigeria won the toss and elected to bat.

14 July
9.00 a.m.
Scorecard

Ghana; 127/9 (20 overs)	v	Nigeria; 129/4 (17.3 overs)(
Francis Bakiweyem 50 (55); Kunle Adegbola 3/17 (3 overs)		Kunle Adegbola 35* (35); Isaac Aboagye 1/19 (4 overs); Moses Anafie 1/19 (4 overs)

Nigeria won by 6 wickets
Lugogo Cricket Oval, Kampala
Umpires: Lalji Bhudia (Ken) and Isaac Oyieko (Ken)
Player of the match: Kunle Adegbola (Ngr)

- Ghana won the toss and elected to bat.

14 July
9.00 a.m.
Scorecard

Kenya; 74/9 (20 overs)	v	Uganda; 78/2 (14.3 overs)
Kennedy Ochieng 26* (28); Deusdedit Muhumuza 2/7 (3 overs)		Abdulah Lubega 36* (42); Vinit Shikotra 1/14 (4 overs)

Uganda won by 8 wickets
Kyambogo Cricket Ground, Kampala
Umpires: Rockie D'Mello (Ken) and Patric Makumbi (Uga)
Player of the match: Abdulah Lubega (Uga)

- Kenya won the toss and elected to bat.

=== Play-offs ===
==== 3rd place play-off ====
15 July
9.00 a.m.
Scorecard

Kenya; 162/5 (20 overs)	v	Nigeria; 139/9 (20 overs)
Irfan Karim 55* (49); Ramit Gill 2/32 (4 overs)		Ademola Onikoyi 53 (39); Raj Savala 3/22 (4 overs)

Kenya won by 23 runs
Lugogo Cricket Oval, Kampala
Umpires: Rockie D'Mello (Ken) and Patric Makumbi (Uga)
Player of the match: Irfan Karim (Ken)

- Nigeria won the toss and elected to field.

==== Final ====
15 July
2.00 p.m.
Scorecard

Namibia; 148/8 (20 overs)	v	Uganda; 149/4 (17.4 overs)
Louis van der Westhuizen 52 (32); Deusdedit Muhumuza 3/26 (4 overs)		Roger Mukasa 42 (31); Wian van Vuuren 2/30 (4 overs)

Uganda won by 6 wickets
Lugogo Cricket Oval, Kampala
Umpires: Wynand Louw (Nam) and Jeff Luck (Nam)
Player of the match: Frank Nsubuga (Uga)

- Namibia won the toss and elected to bat.

== Statistics ==
=== Highest team totals ===
The following table lists the six highest team scores.

Team	Total	Opponent	Ground
Namibia	262/1	Kenya	Lugogo Cricket Oval, Kampala
Namibia	255/2	Ghana	Lugogo Cricket Oval, Kampala
Namibia	237/6	Ghana	Lugogo Cricket Oval, Kampala
Uganda	177/0	Kenya	Kyambogo Cricket Ground, Kampala
Namibia	162/5	Uganda	Kyambogo Cricket Ground, Kampala
Kenya	162/5	Nigeria	Lugogo Cricket Oval, Kampala

=== Most runs ===
The top five highest run scorers (total runs) are included in this table.

Player	Team	Runs	Inns	Avg	S/R	HS	100s	50s	4s	6s
Louis van der Westhuizen	Namibia	406	9	50.75	203.00	159*	1	2	42	28
Craig Williams	Namibia	403	9	50.37	184.86	92	0	3	45	18
Sarel Burger	Namibia	382	9	63.66	128.18	82	0	4	38	6
Duncan Allan	Kenya	262	8	32.75	112.93	58	0	1	38	4
Arthur Kyobe	Uganda	203	9	25.37	100.99	74*	0	1	25	2

=== Highest scores ===
This table contains the top five highest scores made by a batsman in a single innings.

Player	Team	Score	Balls	4s	6s	Opponent	Ground
Louis van der Westhuizen	Namibia	159*	70	7	16	Kenya	Lugogo Cricket Oval, Kampala
Roger Mukasa	Uganda	101*	63	11	1	Kenya	Kyambogo Cricket Ground, Kampala
Louis van der Westhuizen	Namibia	97	40	14	5	Ghana	Lugogo Cricket Oval, Kampala
Craig Williams	Namibia	92	42	11	3	Nigeria	Kyambogo Cricket Ground, Kampala
Craig Williams	Namibia	86	33	7	6	Ghana	Lugogo Cricket Oval, Kampala

=== Most wickets ===
The following table contains the five leading wicket-takers.

Player	Team	Wkts	Mts	Ave	S/R	Econ	BBI
Deusdedit Muhumuza	Uganda	18	9	11.50	11.2	6.11	5/17
Louis van der Westhuizen	Namibia	14	9	10.57	14.6	4.33	3/12
Olalekan Awolowo	Nigeria	13	8	13.92	11.0	7.54	5/14
Brian Masaba	Uganda	12	9	15.33	14.5	6.34	3/18
Gerrie Snyman	Namibia	11	9	14.09	16.3	5.16	3/20

=== Best bowling figures ===
This table lists the top five players with the best bowling figures.

Player	Team	Overs	Figures	Opponent	Ground
Sarel Burger	Namibia	4.0	5/10	Ghana	Lugogo Cricket Oval, Kampala
Olalekan Awolowo	Nigeria	4.0	5/14	Kenya	Kyambogo Cricket Ground, Kampala
Deusdedit Muhumuza	Uganda	3.3	5/17	Ghana	Lugogo Cricket Oval, Kampala
Ramit Gill	Nigeria	4.0	3/8	Kenya	Kyambogo Cricket Ground, Kampala
Adeleke Oyede	Nigeria	2.1	3/9	Uganda	Kyambogo Cricket Ground, Kampala

== See also ==
- 2012 ICC World Twenty20 Qualifier
- World Cricket League Africa Region
