= 2013 Africa Twenty20 Division One =

2013 ICC World Cricket League Africa Region Twenty20 Division One
- Administrator: International Cricket Council
- Cricket format: Twenty20
- Tournament format: Round-robin
- Host: Uganda
- Champions: Kenya (1st title)
- Participants: 5
- Matches: 20
- Player of the series: (Tanzania) Benson Mwita
- Most runs: (Kenya) Maurice Ouma (233)
- Most wickets: (Tanzania) Benson Mwita (15)

The 2013 ICC World Cricket League Africa Region Twenty20 Division One was an international Twenty20 cricket tournament that took place between 23 February–1 March 2013. It was the second edition of the ICC Africa Twenty20 Championship's Division One. Uganda hosted the event for the second time in a row, with all matches again played in the capital, Kampala.

== Teams ==
Teams that qualified are as follows:

- Botswana
- Kenya
- Nigeria
- Tanzania
- Uganda

== Squads ==
| Botswana | Kenya | Nigeria | Tanzania | Uganda |
|---|---|---|---|---|
| Karabo Modise (c); Manan Barot; Akrum Chand; Mosa Gaolekwe; Nabil Master; Saad Mohyuddin; Karabo Motlhanka; Hasantha Mudiyanselage; Segolame Ramatu; Faisal Rana; Denzil Sequeira (wk); Waseem Tajbhay; Thatayone Tshose; Russel Whitey | Collins Obuya (c); Ragheb Aga; Emmanuel Bundi; Irfan Karim (wk); Tanmay Mishra; James Ngoche; Alex Obanda; Nehemiah Odhiambo; Nelson Odhiambo; Lucas Oluoch; Maurice Ouma (wk); Rakep Patel (wk); Hiren Varaiya; Dominic Wesonga | Endurance Ofem (c); Sesan Adedeji; Kunle Adegbola; Usman Adebiyi; Saheed Akolade; Olalekan Awolowo; Olajide Bejide; Joshua Ogunlola; Dotun Olatunji; Segun Olayinka; Oluseye Olympio; Ademola Onikoyi (wk); Chimezie Onwuzulike; Onwuzilike Osita | Hamisi Abdallah (c); Seif Abdul; Salum Ally; Mobeen Elyas; Zamayoni Jabeneke; Kishen Kamania; Issa Kikasi (wk); Riziki Kiseto; Nasibu Mapunda; Benson Mwita; Kassim Nassoro; Abhik Patwa (wk); Ali Rehemtulla; Khalil Rehmtullah | Davis Arinaitwe (c); Arthur Kyobe; Brian Masaba; Deusdedit Muhumuza; Roger Mukasa (wk); Benjamin Musoke; Frank Nsubuga; Richard Okia; Daniel Ruyange; Lawrence Sematimba (wk); Henry Senyondo; Jonathan Ssebanja; Ronald Ssemanda; Charles Waiswa |

== Fixtures ==
=== Group stage ===
==== Points table ====
| Team | P | W | L | T | NR | Points | NRR |
|---|---|---|---|---|---|---|---|
| Kenya | 8 | 7 | 1 | 0 | 0 | 14 | +2.517 |
| Uganda | 8 | 7 | 1 | 0 | 0 | 14 | +1.784 |
| Tanzania | 8 | 3 | 5 | 0 | 0 | 6 | -1.397 |
| Botswana | 8 | 2 | 6 | 0 | 0 | 4 | -0.978 |
| Nigeria | 8 | 1 | 7 | 0 | 0 | 2 | -2.019 |

| Teams that qualified for 2013 ICC World Twenty20 Qualifier |
| Teams that will remain in 2015 Africa Division One |
| Team relegated to 2015 Africa Division Two |

==== Matches ====
23 February
10:00 AM
Scorecard

| Tanzania; 137 (19.3 overs) | v | Botswana; 133/7 (20 overs) |
| Benson Mwita 37 (29); Nabil Master 2/24 (4 overs) | | Karabo Modise 58 (40); Riziki Kiseto 3/19 (4 overs) |

Tanzania won by 4 runs
Lugogo Cricket Oval, Kampala
Umpires: Patric Makumbi (Uga) and Munir Khan (Ken)
Player of the match: Benson Mwita (Tan)

- Tanzania won the toss and elected to bat.

23 February
10:00 AM
Scorecard

| Uganda; 142/6 (20 overs) | v | Kenya; 112/7 (20 overs) |
| Arthur Kyobe 57 (47); James Ngoche 2/16 (4 overs) | | Alex Obanda 28 (29); Deusdedit Muhumuza 3/14 (3 overs) |

Uganda won by 30 runs
Kyambogo Cricket Ground, Kampala
Umpires: David Odhiambo (Ken) and Claude Thornburn (Nam)
Player of the match: Arthur Kyobe (Uga)

- Kenya won the toss and elected to field.

23 February
2:30 PM
Scorecard

| Nigeria; 86/8 (20 overs) | v | Uganda; 87/3 (12.1 overs) |
| Olajide Bejide 34 (40); Davis Arinaitwe 4/5 (4 overs) | | Deusdedit Muhumuza 23 (14); Onwuzilike Osita 1/5 (1.1 overs) |

Uganda won by 7 wickets
Lugogo Cricket Oval, Kampala
Umpires: Rockie D'Mello (Ken) and Johnny Gomez (Gam)
Player of the match: Davis Arinaitwe (Uga)

- Nigeria won the toss and elected to bat.

23 February
2:30 PM
Scorecard

| Kenya; 204/7 (20 overs) | v | Tanzania; 98/8 (20.0 overs) |
| Rakep Patel 77 (47); Benson Mwita 4/34 (4 overs) | | Abhik Patwa 25 (39); Tanmay Mishra 2/1 (1 over) |

Kenya won by 117 runs
Kyambogo Cricket Ground, Kampala
Umpires: Munir Khan (Ken) and Claude Thornburn (Nam)
Player of the match: Rakep Patel (Ken)

- Kenya won the toss and elected to bat.

24 February
10:00 AM
Scorecard

| Botswana; 123/5 (20 overs) | v | Nigeria; 127/3 (16.3 overs) |
| Karabo Modise 86 (64); Joshua Ogunlola 2/15 (4 overs) | | Dotun Olatunji 67* (41); Russel Whitey 1/16 (1 over) |

Nigeria won by 7 wickets
Lugogo Cricket Oval, Kampala
Umpires: David Odhiambo (Ken) and Patric Makumbi (Uga)
Player of the match: Dotun Olatunji (Ngr)

- Nigeria won the toss and elected to field.

24 February
10:00 AM
Scorecard

| Tanzania; 62/9 (20 overs) | v | Uganda; 63/1 (9.1 overs) |
| Hamisi Abdallah 16* (27); Jonathan Ssebanja 2/2 (1 over) | | Arthur Kyobe 34* (20); Hamisi Abdallah 1/20 (4 overs) |

Uganda won by 9 wickets
Kyambogo Cricket Ground, Kampala
Umpires: Johnny Gomez (Gam) and Munir Khan (Ken)
Player of the match: Arthur Kyobe (Uga)

- Tanzania won the toss and elected to bat.

25 February
10:00 AM
Scorecard

| Kenya; 167/5 (20 overs) | v | Botswana; 96/6 (20 overs) |
| Alex Obanda 36 (29); Karabo Modise 2/18 (4 overs) | | Faisal Rana 47* (59); James Ngoche 2/11 (4 overs) |

Kenya won by 71 runs
Lugogo Cricket Oval, Kampala
Umpires: Patric Makumbi (Uga) and Johnny Gomez (Gam)
Player of the match: James Ngoche (Ken)

- Botswana won the toss and elected to field.

25 February
10:00 AM
Scorecard

| Tanzania; 183/5 (20 overs) | v | Nigeria; 118/9 (20 overs) |
| Ali Rehemtulla 90* (60); Saheed Akolade 3/23 (4 overs) | | Sesan Adedeji 25* (34); Riziki Kiseto 3/13 (4 overs) |

Tanzania won by 65 runs
Kyambogo Cricket Ground, Kampala
Umpires: David Odhiambo (Ken) and Munir Khan (Ken)
Player of the match: Ali Rehemtulla (Tan)

- Tanzania won the toss and elected to bat.

25 February
2:30 PM
Scorecard

| Uganda; 86 (18.3 overs) | v | Botswana; 59 (17.4 overs) |
| Charles Waiswa 23 (21); Russel Whitey 3/11 (3 overs) | | Nabil Master 11 (12); Brian Masaba 4/13 (3.4 overs) |

Uganda won by 27 runs
Lugogo Cricket Oval, Kampala
Umpires: Patric Makumbi (Uga) and Claude Thornburn (Nam)
Player of the match: Charles Waiswa (Uga)

- Uganda won the toss and elected to bat.

25 February
2:30 PM
Scorecard

| Kenya; 171/5 (20 overs) | v | Nigeria; 83/7 (20 overs) |
| Maurice Ouma 93 (59); Chimezie Onwuzulike 3/22 (4 overs) | | Olajide Bejide 27 (32); Lucas Oluoch 3/8 (4 overs) |

Kenya won by 88 runs
Kyambogo Cricket Ground, Kampala
Umpires: Rockie D'Mello (Ken) and Munir Khan (Ken)
Player of the match: Maurice Ouma (Ken)

- Kenya won the toss and elected to bat.

26 February
10:00 AM
Scorecard

| Kenya; 185/6 (20 overs) | v | Tanzania; 96/8 (20 overs) |
| Collins Obuya 37* (15); Riziki Kiseto 2/16 (2 overs) | | Nasibu Mapunda 31 (37); Ragheb Aga 2/10 (2 overs) |

Kenya won by 89 runs
Lugogo Cricket Oval, Kampala
Umpires: David Odhiambo (Ken) and Claude Thornburn (Nam)
Player of the match: Ragheb Aga (Ken)

- Kenya won the toss and elected to bat.

26 February
10:00 AM
Scorecard

| Uganda; 169/5 (20 overs) | v | Nigeria; 123/3 (20 overs) |
| Lawrence Sematimba 49 (36); Oluseye Olympio 2/27 (3 overs) | | Kunle Adegbola 46* (42); Charles Waiswa 2/28 (4 overs) |

Uganda won by 46 runs
Kyambogo Cricket Ground, Kampala
Umpires: Munir Khan (Ken) and Rockie D'Mello (Ken)
Player of the match: Lawrence Sematimba (Uga)

- Uganda won the toss and elected to bat.

27 February
10:00 AM
Scorecard

| Uganda; 125/6 (20 overs) | v | Tanzania; 85/8 (20 overs) |
| Deusdedit Muhumuza 36 (23); Seif Abdul 3/17 (4 overs) | | Mobeen Elyas 16 (17); Henry Senyondo 2/15 (4 overs) |

Uganda won by 40 runs
Lugogo Cricket Oval, Kampala
Umpires: Patric Makumbi (Uga) and Rockie D'Mello (Ken)
Player of the match: Frank Nsubuga (Uga)

- Uganda won the toss and elected to bat.

27 February
10:00 AM
Scorecard

| Kenya; 160/7 (20 overs) | v | Botswana; 112/6 (20 overs) |
| Ragheb Aga 51* (28); Russel Whitey 2/22 (4 overs) | | Karabo Modise 37 (31); Hiren Varaiya 4/16 (4 overs) |

Kenya won by 48 runs
Kyambogo Cricket Ground, Kampala
Umpires: David Odhiambo (Ken) and Johnny Gomez (Gam)
Player of the match: Ragheb Aga (Ken)

- Botswana won the toss and elected to field.

27 February
2:30 PM
Scorecard

| Tanzania; 161/8 (20 overs) | v | Nigeria; 139/7 (20 overs) |
| Benson Mwita 55 (33); Chimezie Onwuzulike 3/16 (3 overs) | | Kunle Adegbola 35 (23); Benson Mwita 3/12 (2 overs) |

Tanzania won by 22 runs
Lugogo Cricket Oval, Kampala
Umpires: Munir Khan (Ken) and Patric Makumbi (Uga)
Player of the match: Benson Mwita (Tan)

- Tanzania won the toss and elected to bat.

27 February
2:30 PM
Scorecard

| Uganda; 156/7 (20 overs) | v | Botswana; 124 (19 overs) |
| Arthur Kyobe 59 (43); Nabil Master 4/17 (4 overs) | | Denzil Sequeira 44 (22); Henry Senyondo 3/19 (4 overs) |

Uganda won by 32 runs
Kyambogo Cricket Ground, Kampala
Umpires: Johnny Gomez (Gam) and Claude Thornburn (Nam)
Player of the match: Nabil Master (Bot)

- Botswana won the toss and elected to field.

28 February
2:30 PM
Scorecard

| Nigeria; 118/4 (20 overs) | v | Kenya; 119/4 (18.4 overs) |
| Ademola Onikoyi 48 (44); Hiren Varaiya 1/6 (4 overs) | | Maurice Ouma 48 (42); Oluseye Olympio 2/34 (4 overs) |

Kenya won by 6 wickets
Lugogo Cricket Oval, Kampala
Umpires: Munir Khan (Ken) and Claude Thornburn (Nam)
Player of the match: Maurice Ouma (Ken)

- Kenya won the toss and elected to field.

28 February
2:30 PM
Scorecard

| Botswana; 115 (20 overs) | v | Tanzania; 115/8 (20 overs) |
| Waseem Tajbhay 42 (42); Benson Mwita 4/23 (4 overs) | | Benson Mwita 50 (47); Russel Whitey 2/18 (4 overs) |

Match Tied
(Botswana won the Super Over)
Kyambogo Cricket Ground, Kampala
Umpires: Johnny Gomez (Gam) and Rockie D'Mello (Ken)
Player of the match: Benson Mwita (Tan)

- Botswana won the toss and elected to bat.
- Botswana chased 6 runs to win the Super Over.

1 March
10:00 AM
Scorecard

| Botswana; 158/3 (20 overs) | v | Nigeria; 105/9 (20 overs) |
| Faisal Rana 57 (46); Endurance Ofem 2/24 (3 overs) | | Kunle Adegbola 25 (34); Russel Whitey 2/11 (2 overs) |

Botswana won by 53 runs
Kyambogo Cricket Ground, Kampala
Umpires: Munir Khan (Ken) and Rockie D'Mello (Ken)
Player of the match: Faisal Rana (Bot)

- Nigeria won the toss and elected to field.

1 March
10:00 AM
Scorecard

| Kenya; 156/5 (20 overs) | v | Uganda; 137 (19.2 overs) |
| Alex Obanda 64 (47); Deusdedit Muhumuza 1/10 (1 over) | | Deusdedit Muhumuza 22 (16); James Ngoche 3/18 (4 overs) |

Kenya won by 19 runs
Lugogo Cricket Oval, Kampala
Umpires: David Odhiambo (Ken) and Johnny Gomez (Gam)
Player of the match: Alex Obanda (Ken)

- Kenya won the toss and elected to bat.
- Kenya won the 2012 ICC World Cricket League Africa Region Division 1 T20 tournament as a result of this match.

== Statistics ==
=== Most runs ===
The top five run scorers (total runs) are included in this table.

| Player | Team | Runs | Inns | Avg | S/R | HS | 100s | 50s |
|---|---|---|---|---|---|---|---|---|
| Maurice Ouma | Kenya | 233 | 7 | 33.29 | 129.44 | 93 | 0 | 1 |
| Arthur Kyobe | Uganda | 221 | 8 | 31.57 | 126.29 | 59 | 0 | 2 |
| Collins Obuya | Kenya | 219 | 8 | 31.29 | 123.03 | 50 | 0 | 1 |
| Karabo Modise | Botswana | 209 | 8 | 26.13 | 116.76 | 86 | 0 | 2 |
| Benson Mwita | Tanzania | 199 | 8 | 24.88 | 114.37 | 55 | 0 | 2 |

=== Most wickets ===
The top five wicket takers (total wickets) are listed in this table.

| Player | Team | Wkts | Mts | Ave | S/R | Econ | BBI |
|---|---|---|---|---|---|---|---|
| Benson Mwita | Tanzania | 15 | 8 | 11.87 | 9.6 | 7.42 | 4/23 |
| Davis Arinaitwe | Uganda | 14 | 8 | 8.79 | 13.3 | 3.97 | 4/5 |
| James Ngoche | Kenya | 12 | 8 | 11.75 | 15.5 | 4.55 | 3/18 |
| Nabil Master | Botswana | 12 | 8 | 14.25 | 14.5 | 5.90 | 4/17 |
| Russel Whitey | Botswana | 12 | 8 | 14.92 | 14.5 | 6.17 | 3/11 |

== See also ==
- 2013 ICC World Twenty20 Qualifier
- World Cricket League Africa Region
