= 2016 ICC World Cricket League Division Five =

Cricket tournament

- Dates: 21 – 28 May 2016
- Administrator(s): International Cricket Council
- Cricket format: Limited-overs (50 overs)
- Tournament format(s): Round-robin and Knockout
- Host(s): Jersey
- Champions: Jersey
- Participants: 6
- Matches: 18
- Most runs: (Oman) Zeeshan Maqsood (350)
- Most wickets: (Jersey) Ben Kynman (15)

The 2016 ICC World Cricket League Division Five was an international cricket tournament that took place in Jersey during May 2016. It formed part of the 2012–18 cycle of the World Cricket League (WCL). The Jersey Cricket Board were awarded the hosting rights in October 2015, with the Nigeria Cricket Federation the only other bidder.

The competition's final was played at the Grainville Cricket Ground in Saint Saviour, with Jersey defeating Oman by 44 runs. Both teams were promoted to the 2016 Division Four tournament.

== Teams ==
Six teams qualified for the tournament:

- Oman (5th in 2014 ICC World Cricket League Division Four)
- Jersey (6th in 2014 ICC World Cricket League Division Four)
- Tanzania (3rd in 2014 ICC World Cricket League Division Five)
- Nigeria (4th in 2014 ICC World Cricket League Division Five)
- ~~Suriname (1st in 2015 ICC World Cricket League Division Six)~~
- Guernsey (2nd in 2015 ICC World Cricket League Division Six)
- Vanuatu (3rd in 2015 ICC World Cricket League Division Six, invited in March 2016 to replace Suriname)

In March 2016 Suriname withdrew from the tournament due to an ICC investigation into the eligibility of some of their players. At least six players had doubts raised regarding their eligibility, including the Division Six tournament's man of the series, Gavin Singh and the leading wicket-taker, Muneshwar Patandin. Vanuatu were named as their replacement.

== Match officials ==
Umpires

- (Ireland) Mark Hawthorne – Mentor umpire
- (Ireland) Alan Neill
- (Scotland) Alex Dowdalls
- (Netherlands) Huub Jansen
- (Kenya) Issac Oyieko
- (Jamaica) Jacqueline Williams
- (Netherlands) Pim van Liemt
- (England) Sue Redfern
- (Hong Kong) Tabarak Dar

Match referee

- (England) David Jukes

For the fixture between Oman and Nigeria on 22 May, Sue Redfern was one of the standing umpires, while Jacqueline Williams was the third umpire. It was the first time two female umpires had officiated in a men's match in an ICC tournament.

== Preparation ==
Vanuatu played warm-up matches against Denmark and the Marylebone Cricket Club (MCC) in London. After continuing on to Jersey, the team also played a final warm-up match against Oman, before the start of the tournament proper. Guernsey played a series of warm-up matches in Sussex, England, including two against a Netherlands A side.

== Squads ==
Guernsey Coach: Ashley Wright	Jersey Coach: Neil MacRae	Nigeria Coach: Obruthe Ogbimi
Jamie Nussbaumer (c); Josh Butler; Max Ellis; Ben Ferbrache; David Hooper; Andrew Hutchinson; Tom Kimber; Tom Kirk; Jason Martin; Oliver Newey; Oliver Nightingale; Luke Nussbaumer; G. H. Smit; Matthew Stokes	Peter Gough (c); Corey Bisson; Cornelis Bodenstein; Jake Dunford; Luke Gallichan; Will Harris; Anthony Hawkins-Kay; Jonty Jenner; Ben Kynman; Robert McBey; Rhys Palmer; Charles Perchard; Benjamin Stevens; Nathaniel Watkins	Kunle Adegbola (c); Abioye Abiodun; Sesan Adedeji; Chima Akachukwu; Joshua Ayannaike; Salako Azeez; Olajide Bejide; Joshua Ogunlola; Emmanuel Okwudili; Segun Olayinka; Oluseye Olympio; Ademola Onikoyi; Chimezie Onwuzulike; Leke Oyede
Oman Coach: Duleep Mendis	Tanzania Coach: Zully Rehemtullah	Vanuatu Coach: Shane Deitz
Ajay Lalcheta (c); Aamir Kaleem; Munis Ansari; Bilal Khan; Jatinder Singh; Swapnil Khadye; Khawar Ali; Mehran Khan; Rajesh Ranpura; Noorul Riaz; Sufyan Mehmood; Vaibhav Wategaonkar; Zeeshan Maqsood; Zeeshan Siddiqui	Hamisi Abdallah (c); Arun Dagar; Shaheed Dhanani; Arshan Jasani; Ashish Kamania; Kishen Kamania; Athumani Kassim; Riziki Kiseto; Nasibu Mapunda; Ally Mpeka; Kassim Nassoro; Abhik Patwa; Khalil Rehmtullah; Jitin Singh	Andrew Mansale (c); Callum Blake; Jelany Chilia; Jonathon Dunn; Worford Kalworai; Patrick Matautaava; Christian Mete; Nalin Nipiko; Simpson Obed; Joshua Rasu; Apolinaire Stephen; Ronald Tari; Clement Tommy; Jamal Vira

== Points table ==
Pos	Team	Pld	W	L	T	NR	Pts	NRR	
1	Oman	5	5	0	0	0	10	1.978	Promoted to 2016 Division Four
2	Jersey	5	4	1	0	0	8	1.431	Promoted to 2016 Division Four
3	Guernsey	5	3	2	0	0	6	0.472	
4	Vanuatu	5	1	4	0	0	2	−0.347	
5	Tanzania	5	1	4	0	0	2	−1.328	
6	Nigeria	5	1	4	0	0	2	−2.627	

Source: Cricinfo

== Fixtures ==
=== Round robin ===
21 May
11:00
Scorecard

Oman; 132/9 (23 overs)	v	Jersey; 48/1 (9 overs)
Zeeshan Maqsood 29 (14); Charles Perchard 3/17 (4 overs)		Jonty Jenner 25(23); Aamir Kaleem 1/6 (1 over)

No result
Grainville Cricket Ground, Saint Saviour
Umpires: Mark Hawthorne (Ireland) and Jacqueline Williams (West Indies)

- Jersey won the toss and elected to field.
- Rain reduced the match to 23 overs per side.
- With no result, the match was restarted on the reserve day, 23 May.

21 May
11:00
Scorecard

Tanzania; 115/8 (28 overs)	v	Nigeria; 117/4 (24.5 overs)
Kassim Nassoro 30 (38); Sesan Adedeji 3/14 (5 overs)		Ademola Onikoyi 68 (75); Kassim Nassoro 2/18 (6 overs)

Nigeria won by 6 wickets
Farmers Cricket Club Ground, Saint Martin
Umpires: Huub Jansen (Netherlands) and Isaac Oyieko (Kenya)
Player of the match: Ademola Onikoyi (Nigeria)

- Tanzania won the toss and elected to bat.
- Rain reduced the match to 28 overs per side.

21 May
11:00
Scorecard

Vanuatu; 127/7 (26 overs)	v	Guernsey; 105/6 (21 overs)
Jonathon Dunn 42 (57); Thomas Kirk 2/17 (3 overs)		Matthew Stokes 34 (34); Andrew Mansale 4/19 (6 overs)

Guernsey won by 5 runs (DLS method)
FB Playing Fields, Saint Clement
Umpires: Alan Neill (Ireland) and Sue Redfern (England)
Player of the match: Andrew Mansale (Vanuatu)

- Guernsey won the toss and elected to field.
- Rain reduced the match to 26 overs per side.

22 May
11:00
Scorecard

Jersey; 200/9 (37 overs)	v	Vanuatu; 98 (30.1 overs)
Nat Watkins 65 (98); Andrew Mansale 4/38 (7 overs)		Joshua Rasu 43 (60); Ben Stevens 3/21 (5.1 overs)

Jersey won by 102 runs
Grainville Cricket Ground, Saint Saviour
Umpires: Huub Jansen (Netherlands) and Tabarak Dar (Hong Kong)
Player of the match: Nathaniel Watkins (Jersey)

- Vanuatu won the toss and elected to field.
- Rain reduced the match to 37 overs per side.

22 May
11:00
Scorecard

Tanzania; 108/9 (41 overs)	v	Guernsey; 109/2 (26.1 overs)
Arun Dagar 35(40); Max Ellis 3/10 (9 overs)		Matthew Stokes 44 (79); Jitin Singh 1/10 (4 overs)

Guernsey won by 8 wickets
Farmers Cricket Club Ground, Saint Martin
Umpires: Mark Hawthorne (Ireland) and Pim van Liemt (Netherlands)
Player of the match: Oliver Newey (Guernsey)

- Tanzania won the toss and elected to bat.
- Rain reduced the match to 42 overs per side.

22 May
11:00
Scorecard

Oman; 220/6 (50 overs)	v	Nigeria; 39 (23.5 overs)
Aamir Kaleem 78 (80); Oluseye Olympio 1/19 (7 overs)		Olajide Bejide 7 (7); Ajay Lalcheta 4/7 (6.5 overs)

Oman won by 181 runs
FB Playing Fields, Saint Clement
Umpires: Alex Dowdalls (Scotland) and Sue Redfern (England)
Player of the match: Ajay Lalcheta (Oman)

- Nigeria won the toss and elected to field.
- Nigeria's total is the third-lowest in a World Cricket League match.

23 May
11:00
Scorecard

Oman; 205/9 (50 overs)	v	Jersey; 147 (41.4 overs)
Zeeshan Maqsood 69 (103); Anthony Hawkins-Kay 2/18 (6 overs)		Anthony Hawkins-Kay 45 (61); Munis Ansari 5/27 (10 overs)

Oman won by 58 runs
Grainville Cricket Ground, Saint Saviour
Umpires: Mark Hawthorne (Ireland) and Jacqueline Williams (West Indies)
Player of the match: Munis Ansari (Oman)

- Jersey won the toss and elected to field.
- This was a replay of the fixture from 21 May which ended as a no result.
- Oman's Munis Ansari took career-best figures of 5 for 27.

24 May
11:00
Scorecard

Jersey; 273/5 (50 overs)	v	Tanzania; 188/8 (50 overs)
Ben Stevens 103 (88); Athumani Cassim 2/53 (10 overs); Arun Dagar 2/53 (10 overs)		Shaheed Dhanani 42 (71); Charles Perchard 2/24 (4 overs)

Jersey won by 85 runs
FB Playing Fields, Saint Clement
Umpires: Alex Dowdalls (Scotland) and Huub Jansen (Netherlands)
Player of the match: Ben Stevens (Jersey)

- Jersey won the toss and elected to bat.

24 May
11:00
Scorecard

Nigeria; 99 (34 overs)	v	Guernsey; 100/0 (18.5 overs)
Joshua Ayannaike 26 (44); Max Ellis 4/9 (9 overs)		Matthew Stokes 48 (58); Leke Oyede 0/7 (1 over)

Guernsey won by 10 wickets
Grainville Cricket Ground, Saint Saviour
Umpires: Alan Neill (Ireland) and Jacqueline Williams (West Indies)
Player of the match: Max Ellis (Guernsey)

- Nigeria won the toss and elected to bat.

24 May
11:00
Scorecard

Vanuatu; 204/7 (50 overs)	v	Oman; 208/1 (40.4 overs)

Oman won by 9 wickets
Farmers Cricket Club Ground, Saint Martin
Umpires: Mark Hawthorne (Ireland) and Issac Oyieko (Kenya)
Player of the match: Zeeshan Maqsood (Oman)

- Vanuatu won the toss and elected to bat.

25 May
11:00
Scorecard

Tanzania; 94 (32.5 overs)	v	Oman; 96/1 (17.3 overs)

Oman won by 9 wickets
Grainville Cricket Ground, Saint Saviour
Umpires: Huub Jansen (Netherlands) and Alan Neill (Ireland)
Player of the match: Aamir Kaleem (Oman)

- Oman won the toss and elected to field.

25 May
11:00
Scorecard

Guernsey; 149 (42.2 overs)	v	Jersey; 150/3 (39.5 overs)

Jersey won by 7 wickets
Farmers Cricket Club Ground, Saint Martin
Umpires: Mark Hawthorne (Ireland) and Sue Redfern (England)
Player of the match: Ben Stevens (Jersey)

- Jersey won the toss and elected to field.

25 May
11:00
Scorecard

Vanuatu; 227/9 (50 overs)	v	Nigeria; 117 (38 overs)

Vanuatu won by 110 runs
FB Playing Fields, Saint Clement
Umpires: Alex Dowdalls (Scotland) and Issac Oyieko (Kenya)

- Nigeria won the toss and elected to field.

27 May
11:00
Scorecard

Vanuatu; 149 (48.5 overs)	v	Tanzania; 150/3 (42.1 overs)

Tanzania won by 7 wickets
Grainville Cricket Ground, Saint Saviour
Umpires: Mark Hawthorne (Ireland) and Tabarak Dar (Hong Kong)

- Vanuatu won the toss and elected to bat.

27 May
11:00
Scorecard

Nigeria; 93 (26.3 overs)	v	Jersey; 94/0 (14.1 overs)

Jersey won by 10 wickets
Farmers Cricket Club Ground, Saint Martin
Umpires: Huub Jansen (Netherlands) and Jacqueline Williams (West Indies)
Player of the match: Ben Kynman (Jersey)

- Jersey won the toss and elected to field.

27 May
11:00
Scorecard

Guernsey; 141/8 (50 overs)	v	Oman; 142/8 (36.2 overs)

Oman won by 2 wickets
FB Playing Fields, Saint Clement
Umpires: Issac Oyieko (Kenya) and Pim van Liemt (Netherlands)
Player of the match: Aamir Kaleem (Oman)

- Oman won the toss and elected to field.

== Playoffs ==
=== 5th-place playoff ===
28 May
11:00
Scorecard

Nigeria; 213/8 (50 overs)	v	Tanzania; 214/9 (49.5 overs)
Olajide Bejide 56* (50); Khalil Rehmtullah 5/51 (10 overs)		Arshan Jasani 53 (93); Leke Oyede 5/51 (10 overs)

Tanzania won by 1 wicket
FB Playing Fields, Saint Clement
Umpires: Sue Redfern (England) and Jacqueline Williams (West Indies)

- Tanzania won the toss and elected to field.

=== 3rd-place playoff ===
28 May
11:00
Scorecard

Guernsey; 230/6 (50 overs)	v	Vanuatu; 211 (50 overs)
Matthew Stokes 82 (106); Patrick Matautaava 2/31 (10 overs)		Nalin Nipiko 68 (101); Luke Nussbaumer 4/43 (10 overs)

Guernsey won by 19 runs
Farmers Cricket Club Ground, Saint Martin
Umpires: Alex Dowdalls (Scotland) and Mark Hawthorne (Ireland)

- Vanuatu won the toss and elected to field.

=== Final ===
28 May
11:00
Scorecard

Jersey; 194/7 (50 overs)	v	Oman; 150 (45.3 overs)
Anthony Hawkins-Kay 60* (82); Rajeshkumar Ranpura 3/21 (10 overs)		Zeeshan Maqsood 43 (22); Ben Kynman 4/10 (8 overs)

Jersey won by 44 runs
Grainville Cricket Ground, Saint Saviour
Umpires: Alan Neill (Ireland) and Tabarak Dar (Hong Kong)
Player of the match: Anthony Hawkins-Kay (Jersey)

- Oman won the toss and elected to field.

== Final placings ==
After the conclusion of the tournament the teams were distributed as follows:

Pos	Team	Status
1st	Jersey	Promoted to 2016 ICC World Cricket League Division Four
2nd	Oman	Promoted to 2016 ICC World Cricket League Division Four
3rd	Guernsey	Remained in 2017 ICC World Cricket League Division Five
4th	Vanuatu	Relegated to regional tournaments
5th	Tanzania	Relegated to regional tournaments
6th	Nigeria	Relegated to regional tournaments

== Statistics ==
=== Most runs ===
The top five runscorers are included in this table, ranked by runs scored and then by batting average.

Player	Team	Runs	Inns	Avg	Highest	100s	50s
Zeeshan Maqsood	Oman	350	7	70.00	130*	1	2
Matthew Stokes	Jersey	247	6	61.75	82	0	1
Ben Stevens	Jersey	205	6	68.33	103*	1	1
Nalin Nipiko	Vanuatu	189	6	37.80	93*	0	2
Nathaniel Watkins	Jersey	183	6	36.60	65	0	2

Source: ESPNcricinfo

=== Most wickets ===
The top five wicket takers are listed in this table, ranked by wickets taken and then by bowling average.

Player	Team	Overs	Wkts	Ave	Econ	SR	BBI
Ben Kynman	Jersey	40.3	15	8.80	3.25	16.2	6/18
Rajesh Ranpura	Oman	54.4	14	10.14	2.59	23.4	4/18
Aamir Kaleem	Oman	44.5	12	11.08	2.96	22.4	5/23
Ben Stevens	Jersey	48.1	12	14.75	3.67	24.0	3/21
Nathaniel Watkins	Jersey	51.3	11	17.54	3.74	28.0	3/23

Source: ESPNcricinfo
