= 2011 Africa Twenty20 Division Two =

2011 ICC Africa Twenty20 Division Two
- Administrator: International Cricket Council
- Cricket format: Twenty20
- Tournament format: Round-robin
- Host: South Africa
- Participants: 9
- Matches: 36
- Most runs: (Nigeria) Sean Philips (446)
- Most wickets: (Ghana) Vincent Ateak (15)
- Official website: ICC European Championship

The 2011 ICC Africa Twenty20 Division Two is a cricket tournament that took place between 14–19 May 2011. South Africa hosted the event.

== Teams ==
Teams that qualified are as follows:

- Botswana
- Ghana
- Malawi
- Mozambique
- Nigeria
- Rwanda
- Sierra Leone
- Eswatini
- Tanzania

== Fixtures ==
=== Group stage ===
==== Points Table ====
Team	P	W	L	T	NR	Points	NRR
Nigeria	8	7	1	0	0	14	2.776
Ghana	8	6	2	0	0	12	1.749
Botswana	8	6	2	0	0	12	0.890
Tanzania	8	5	3	0	0	10	1.494
Sierra Leone	8	5	3	0	0	10	–0.552
Eswatini	8	3	5	0	0	6	–1.513
Mozambique	8	2	6	0	0	4	–0.810
Malawi	8	1	4	0	0	2	–1.768
Rwanda	8	1	7	0	0	2	–2.048

==== Matches ====
14 May
Scorecard

Mozambique; 108/7 (20 overs)	v	Botswana; 110/5 (18.2 overs)
Bineesh Vadavathy 23 (27); Omar Ali 2/19 (3 overs)		Faisal Rana 45 (40); Bineesh Vadavathy 3/15 (4 overs)

Botswana won by 5 wickets
Willowmoore Park B Field, Benoni
Umpires: Emmanuel Byiringiro (Rwa) and Baker Elonge (Uga)
Player of the match: James Moses (Bot)

- Botswana won the toss and elected to field.

14 May
Scorecard

Rwanda; 59 (18.3 overs)	v	Botswana; 60/3 (10.4 overs)
Srinath Vardhineni 21* (20); Taroesh Trivedi 2/8 (4 overs)		Faisal Rana 18 (15); Srinath Vardhineni 2/3 (2 overs)

Botswana won by 7 wickets
Willowmoore Park, Benoni
Umpires: Baker Elonge (Uga) and Isaac Oyieko (Ken)

- Rwanda won the toss and elected to bat.

14 May
Scorecard

Ghana; 133/7 (20 overs)	v	Mozambique; 80/9 (20 overs)
Peter Ananya 32* (19); Bineesh Vadavathy 3/37 (4 overs)		Kaleem Shah 17 (24); Vincent Ateak 2/3 (4 overs)

Ghana won by 53 runs
Willowmoore Park B Field, Benoni
Umpires: H Bhallo (Tan) and Deepak Madangarli (Bot)

- Ghana won the toss and elected to bat.

14 May
Scorecard

Malawi; 88/6 (20 overs)	v	Nigeria; 91/1 (10.2 overs)
Arjun Kalaria 20 (35); Femi Odubeyo 2/13 (4 overs)		Ademola Onikoyi 50* (30); Nitesh Patel 1/26 (3 overs)

Nigeria won by 9 wickets
Willowmoore Park A Field, Benoni
Umpires: Ravi Angara (Bot) and Tariq Mukhtar (Moz)
Player of the match: Ademola Onikoyi (Ngr)

- Nigeria won the toss and elected to field.

14 May
Scorecard

Eswatini; 92/7 (20 overs)	v	Sierra Leone; 93/2 (14.1 overs)
Suhail Ahmed 22 (23); Julius Quee 3/13 (4 overs)		Abu Kamara 52* (47); Eastian Sauerman 1/16 (3 overs)

Sierra Leone won by 8 wickets
Willowmoore Park, Benoni
Umpires: Ravi Angara (Bot) and Lucy Mayunga (Tan)

- Sierra Leone won the toss and elected to field.

14 May
Scorecard

Tanzania; 154/3 (20 overs)	v	Rwanda; 87/5 (20 overs)
Benson Mwita 54* (32); Srinath Vardhineni 1/35 (5 overs)		Andre Kayitera 41* (44); Riziki Kiseto 2/16 (3 overs)

Tanzania won by 67 runs
Willowmoore Park A Field, Benoni
Umpires: Tariq Mukhtar (Moz) and Isaac Oyieko (Ken)
Player of the match: Benson Mwita (Tan)

- Rwanda won the toss and elected to field.

15 May
Scorecard

Eswatini; 122/9 (20 overs)	v	Botswana; 123/1 (16.1 overs)
Naeem Gull 37 (25); Taroesh Trivedi 2/10 (4 overs)		Faisal Rana 78* (54); Eastian Sauerman 1/22 (3 overs)

Botswana won by 9 wickets
Willowmoore Park A Field, Benoni
Umpires: Emmanuel Byiringiro (Rwa) and Lucy Mayunga (Tan)
Player of the match: Faisal Rana (Bot)

- Swaziland won the toss and elected to bat.

15 May
Scorecard

Ghana; 114/8 (20 overs)	v	Nigeria; 118/3 (18.3 overs)
Samson Awiah 40 (48); Olalekan Awolowo 5/24 (3 overs)		Ramit Gill 57* (43); Vincent Ateak 2/7 (4 overs)

Nigeria won by 7 wickets
Willowmoore Park B Field, Benoni
Umpires: Ravi Angara (Bot) and Baker Elonge (Uga)
Player of the match: Oalalekan Awolowo (Ngr)

- Nigeria won the toss and elected to field.

15 May
Scorecard

Ghana; 178/3 (20 overs)	v	Eswatini; 145/7 (20 overs)
Samson Awiah 65* (59); Naeem Gull 2/20 (4 overs)		Naeem Gull 66 (48); Isaac Aboagye 3/29 (4 overs)

Ghana won by 33 runs
Willowmoore Park A Field, Benoni
Umpires: H Bhallo (Tan) and Emmanuel Byiringiro (Rwa)
Player of the match: Obed Harvey (Gha)

- Swaziland won the toss and elected to field.

15 May
Scorecard

Tanzania; 159/8 (20 overs)	v	Malawi; 54 (10.4 overs)
Kassim Nassoro 42 (27); Mehul Patel 3/14 (3 overs)		Akbar Bhana 20 (28); Khalil Rehemtulla 3/9 (4 overs)

Tanzania won by 105 runs
Willowmoore Park B Field, Benoni
Umpires: Deepak Madangarli (Bot) and Tariq Mukhtar (Moz)
Player of the match: Kassim Nassoro (Tan)

- Tanzania won the toss and elected to bat.

15 May
Scorecard

Mozambique; 127/9 (20 overs)	v	Rwanda; 97/5 (20 overs)
Ramesh Pania 30* (26); Derrick Bayingana 3/20 (3 overs)		Andre Kayitera 25 (33); Mohammad Shahzad

Mozambique won by 30 runs
Willowmoore Park, Benoni
Umpires: Emmanuel Byiringiro (Rwa) and Lucy Mayunga (Tan)
Player of the match: Mohammad Shahzad (Moz)

- Mozambique won the toss and elected to bat.

15 May
Scorecard

Nigeria; 180/4 (20 overs)	v	Sierra Leone; 112/9 (20 overs)
Sean Philips 109* (59); Emmanuel Kamara 1/11 (1 over)		Abu Kamara 47 (30); Sean Philips 4/17 (4 overs)

Nigeria won by 68 runs
Willowmoore Park, Benoni
Umpires: Ravi Angara (Bot) and Isaac Oyieko (Ken)
Player of the match: Sean Philips (Ngr)

- Sierra Leone won the toss and elected to field.

16 May
Scorecard

Botswana; 153/5 (19.5 overs)	v	Nigeria; 141 (19.2 overs)
Faisal Rana 57 (42); Endurance Ofem 4/14 (4 overs)		Olajide Bejide 32 (19); James Moses 2/8 (1.2 overs)

Botswana won by 12 runs
Willowmoore Park, Benoni
Umpires: Baker Elonge (Uga) and Isaac Oyieko (Ken)
Player of the match: James Moses (Bot)

- Nigeria won the toss and elected to field.

16 May
Scorecard

Sierra Leone; 137/7 (20 overs)	v	Malawi; 133/5 (20 overs)
Lansana Lamin 46 (34); Mehul Patel 2/23 (4 overs)		Graeme Bond 65 (43); Edward Marrah 2/24 (4 overs)

Sierra Leone won by 4 runs
Willowmoore Park A Field, Benoni
Umpires: Deepak Madangarli (Bot) and Lucy Mayunga (Tan)
Player of the match: Graeme Bond (Maw)

- Malawi won the toss and elected to field.

16 May
Scorecard

Mozambique; 83 (18.5 overs)	v	Eswatini; 84/2 (12.4 overs)
Bineesh Vadavathy 28 (41); Haris Rashid 2/12 (2.5 overs)		Joseph Wright 28* (13); Kaleem Shah 1/14 (4 overs)

Swaziland won by 8 wickets
Willowmoore Park B Field, Benoni
Umpires: Deepak Madangarli (Bot) and Lucy Mayunga (Tan)
Player of the match: Joseph Wright (Swz)

- Mozambique won the toss and elected to bat.

16 May
Scorecard

Mozambique; 102/8 (20 overs)	v	Tanzania; 103/5 (17.2 overs)
Mathew Singh 27 (26); Kassim Nassoro 2/12 (4 overs)		Abhik Patwa 54* (45); Christiaan Louw 2/17 (4 overs)

Tanzania won by 5 wickets
Willowmoore Park, Benoni
Umpires: Emmanuel Byiringiro (Rwa) and Baker Elonge (Uga)
Player of the match: Abhik Patwa (Tan)

- Mozambique won the toss and elected to bat.

16 May
Scorecard

Rwanda; 89/6 (20 overs)	v	Eswatini; 90/4 (16.4 overs)
Audifax Byiringiro 23 (32); Haris Rashid 3/21 (4 overs)		Joseph Wright 38* (30); Eric Dusingizimana 1/14 (4 overs); Subhasis Samal 1/14 (4 overs)

Swaziland won by 6 wickets
Willowmoore Park B Field, Benoni
Umpires: H Bhallo (Tan) and Tariq Mukhtar (Moz)
Player of the match: Joseph Wright (Swz)

- Swaziland won the toss and elected to field.

16 May
Scorecard

Sierra Leone; 127/8 (20 overs)	v	Tanzania; 125/6 (20 overs)
Abu Kamara 42 (36); Kassim Nassoro 2/17 (4 overs)		Kassim Nassoro 50* (38); Abu Kamara 2/21 (4 overs)

Sierra Leone won by 2 runs
Willowmoore Park A Field, Benoni
Umpires: Ravi Angara (Bot) and Tariq Mukhtar (Moz)
Player of the match: Abu Kamara (SL)

- Sierra Leone won the toss and elected to bat.

17 May
Scorecard

Botswana; 120/7 (20 overs)	v	Malawi; 121/8 (19.4 overs)
Faisal Rana 40 (31); Mehul Patel 4/14 (3 overs)		Zaeem Akbanie 38 (48); Segolame Ramatu 2/16 (3 overs)

Malawi won by 2 wickets
Willowmoore Park B Field, Benoni
Umpires: H Bhallo (Tan) and Tariq Mukhtar (Moz)
Player of the match: Naeem Chaudhry (Maw)

- Botswana won the toss and elected to bat.

17 May
Scorecard

Ghana; 166/4 (20 overs)	v	Malawi; 114/7 (20 overs)
Moses Anafie 38 (35); Tariq Tarmahomed 2/36 (3 overs)		Naeem Chaudhry 32* (24); Peter Ananya 2/14 (4 overs)

Ghana won by 52 runs
Willowmoore Park, Benoni
Umpires: H Bhallo (Tan) and Tariq Mukhtar (Moz)
Player of the match: Peter Ananya (Gha)

- Malawi won the toss and elected to field.

17 May
Scorecard

Ghana; 116/5 (20 overs)	v	Sierra Leone; 117/2 (17 overs)
Lansana Lamin 30 (21); Vincent Ateak 2/15 (4 overs)		Obed Harvey 53* (31); Edward Marrah 1/13 (3 overs)

Ghana won by 8 wickets
Willowmoore Park, Benoni
Umpires: Baker Elonge (Uga) and Isaac Oyieko (Ken)
Player of the match: Obed Harvey (Gha)

- Ghana won by 8 wickets

17 May
Scorecard

Mozambique; 105/8 (20 overs)	v	Nigeria; 109/5 (16.4 overs)
Kaleem Shah 28 (29); Oluseye Olympio 2/18 (4 overs)		Olajide Bejide 23* (24); Kaleem Shah 2/12 (4 overs)

Nigeria won by 5 wickets
Willowmoore Park A Field, Benoni
Umpires: Emmanuel Byiringiro (Rwa) and Lucy Mayunga (Tan)
Player of the match: Sean Schoeman (Moz)

- Mozambique won the toss and elected to bat.

17 May
Scorecard

Nigeria; 65 (18.1 overs)	v	Rwanda; 67/1 (8.3 overs)
Audifax Byiringiro 16 (28); Olalekan Awolowo 4/11 (4 overs)		Sean Philips 45* (35); Eric Dusabemungu 1/28 (4 overs)

Nigeria won by 9 wickets
Willowmoore Park A Field, Benoni
Umpires: Deepak Madangarli (Bot) and Lucy Mayunga (Tan)
Player of the match: Sean Philips (Ngr)

- Rwanda won the toss and elected to bat.

17 May
Scorecard

Tanzania; 143/5 (20 overs)	v	Eswatini; 100 (19.1 overs)
Kassim Nassoro 37 (27); Eastian Sauerman 2/37 (3 overs)		Naeem Gull 36 (44); Riziki Kiseto 3/19 (4 overs)

Tanzania won by 43 runs
Willowmoore Park B Field, Benoni
Umpires: Ravi Angara (Bot) and Lucy Mayunga (Tan)
Player of the match: Riziki Kiseto (Tan)

- Swaziland won the toss and elected to field.

18 May
Scorecard

Botswana; 115/9 (20 overs)	v	Sierra Leone; 36 (12 overs)
Denzil Sequeira 25* (25); Gabriel Anthony 3/25 (4 overs)		Edward Marrah 11 (16); Omar Ali 4/10 (4 overs)

Botswana won by 79 runs
Willowmoore Park B Field, Benoni
Umpires: Baker Elonge (Uga) and Isaac Oyieko (Ken)
Player of the match: Omar Ali (Bot)

- Sierra Leone won the toss and elected to field.

18 May
[ Scorecard]

Tanzania; 104/8 (20 overs)	v	Ghana; 82 (19.1 overs)
Abhik Patwa 43 (32); Vincent Ateak 3/9 (4 overs)		James Vifah 26 (28); Kassim Nassoro 3/12 (4 overs)

Tanzania won by 22 runs
Willowmoore Park, Benoni
Umpires: Ravi Angara Bot) and Isaac Oyieko (Ken)
Player of the match: Kassim Nassoro (Tan)

- Ghana won the toss and elected to field.

18 May
Scorecard

Rwanda; 126/5 (19.5 overs)	v	Malawi; 100 (19.5 overs)
Audifax Byiringiro 44* (52); Arjun Kalaria 2/17 (4 overs)		Naeem Chaudhry 21 (17); Eric Dusabemungu 3/12 (3,5 overs)

Rwanda won by 26 runs
Willowmoore Park, Benoni
Umpires: Deepak Nadangarli (Bot) and Lucy Mayunga (Tan)
Player of the match: Eric Dusabemungu (Rwa)

- Malawi won the toss and elected to field.

18 May
Scorecard

Eswatini; 149/6 (20 overs)	v	Malawi; 144/7 (20 overs)
Eastian Sauerman 41 (31); Nitesh Patel 2/23 (3 overs)		Faraz Junejo 62 (50); Waheed Akhtar 3/29 (4 overs)

Swaziland won by 5 runs
Willowmoore Park A Field, Benoni
Umpires: Baker Elonge (Uga) and Tariq Mukhtar (Moz)
Player of the match: Joseph Wright (Swz)

- Swaziland won the toss and elected to bat.

18 May
Scorecard

Mozambique; 99/8 (20 overs)	v	Sierra Leone; 102/3 (15.4 overs)
Kaleem Shah 31 (32); Julius Quee 3/12 (4 overs)		Lansana Lamin 50* (34); Mohammad Shahzad 1/10 (4 overs)

Sierra Leone won by 7 wickets
Willowmoore Park B Field, Benoni
Umpires: Emmanuel Byiringiro (Rwa) and Deepak Madangarli (Bot)
Player of the match: Lansana Lamin (SL)

- Sierra Leone won the toss and elected to field.

18 May
Scorecard

Nigeria; 208/4 (20 overs)	v	Eswatini; 46 (14.5 overs)
Sean Philips 105* (64); Litschka Tumber 1/34 (2 overs)		Joseph Wright 12 (13); Olalekan Awolowo 3/8 (3.5 overs)

Nigeria won by 162 runs
Willowmoore Park A Field, Benoni
Umpires: Ravi Angara (Bot) and H Bhallo (Tan)
Player of the match: Sean Philips (Ngr)

- Swaziland won the toss and elected to field.

19 May
Scorecard

Ghana; 157/4 (20 overs)	v	Botswana; 103/9 (20 overs)
Obed Harvey 57* (42); Segolame Ramatu 2/32 (3 overs)		Faisal Rana 33 (32); Kofi Bagabena 3/17 (4 overs)

Ghana won by 54 runs
Willowmoore Park A Field, Benoni
Umpires: Baker Elonge (Uga) and Tariq Mukhtar (Moz)
Player of the match: Obed Harvey (Gha)

- Ghana won the toss and elected to bat.

19 May
Scorecard

Tanzania; 121/4 (20 overs)	v	Botswana; 122/7 (8.3 overs)
Seif Khalifa 37 (41); James Moses 2/13 (4 overs)		Waseem Tajbhay 38 (33); Khalil Rehemtulla 2/19 (4 overs)

Botswana won by 3 wickets
Willowmoore Park A Field, Benoni
Umpires: Baker Elonge (Uga) and Isaac Oyieko (Ken)
Player of the match: Waseen Tajbhay (Bot)

- Tanzania won the toss and elected to bat.

19 May
Scorecard

Rwanda; 59 (20 overs)	v	Ghana; 60/3 (6 overs)
Eric Dusabemungu 15* (23); Isaac Aboagye 3/16 (4 overs)		Julius Mensah 32* (17); Eric Dysabemungu 2/31 (3 overs)

Ghana won by 7 wickets
Willowmoore Park, Benoni
Umpires: Deepak Madangarli (Bot) and Lucy Mayunga (Tan)
Player of the match: Isaac Aboagye (Gha)

- Rwanda won the toss and elected to bat.

19 May
Scorecard

Mozambique; 131/5 (20 overs)	v	Malawi; 110/8 (20 overs)
Ramesh Pania 46* (62); Arjun Kalaria 2/13 (4 overs)		Faraz Junejo 32 (27); Kaleem Shah 3/18 (4 overs)

Mozambique won by 21 runs
Willowmoore Park B Field, Benoni
Umpires: H Bhallo (Tan) and Emmanuel Byitingiro (Rwa)
Player of the match: Ramesh Pania (Moz)

- Mozambique won the toss and elected to bat.

19 May
Scorecard

Nigeria; 150/6 (20 overs)	v	Tanzania; 144/4 (20 overs)
Sean Philips 80* (55); Harsh Ramaiya 2/17 (4 overs)		Benson Mwita 49 (28); Ramit Gill 2/23 (4 overs)

Nigeria won by 6 runs
Willowmoore Park, Benoni
Umpires: Ravi Angara (Bot) and Isaac Oyieko (Ken)
Player of the match: Sean Philips (Ngr)

- Nigeria won the toss and elected to bat.

19 May
Scorecard

Rwanda; 87 (20 overs)	v	Sierra Leone; 89/4 (18.1 overs)
Subhasis Samal 31* (21); Edward Marrah 3/16 (4 overs)		Lansana Lamin 35* (43); Subhasis Samal 1/15 (4 overs)

Sierra Leone won by 6 wickets
Willowmoore Park B Field, Benoni
Umpires: H Bhallo (Tan) and Deepak Madangarli (Bot)
Player of the match: Lansana Lamin (SL)

- Sierra Leone won the toss and elected to field.

== Statistics ==
=== Highest team totals ===
The following table lists the six highest team scores.

Team	Total	Opponent	Ground
Nigeria	208/4	Eswatini	Willowmoore Park A Field, Benoni
Nigeria	180/4	Sierra Leone	Willowmoore Park, Benoni
Ghana	178/3	Eswatini	Willowmoore Park A Field, Benoni
Ghana	166/4	Malawi	Willowmoore Park, Benoni
Tanzania	159/8	Malawi	Willowmoore Park B Field, Benoni
Ghana	157/4	Botswana	Willowmoore Park A Field, Benoni

=== Most runs ===
The top five highest run scorers (total runs) are included in this table.

Player	Team	Runs	Inns	Avg	S/R	HS	100s	50s	4s	6s
Sean Philips	Nigeria	446	8	148.66	141.13	109*	2	1	34	21
Faisal Rana	Botswana	318	8	45.42	124.21	78*	0	2	35	6
Obed Harvey	Ghana	246	8	49.20	127.46	58*	0	3	12	16
Kassim Nassoro	Tanzania	223	8	74.33	112.06	50*	0	1	21	1
Abu Kamara	Sierra Leone	210	8	30.00	93.33	52*	0	1	26	3

=== Highest scores ===
This table contains the top five highest scores made by a batsman in a single innings.

Player	Team	Score	Balls	4s	6s	Opponent	Ground
Sean Philips	Nigeria	109*	59	6	8	Sierra Leone	Willowmoore Park, Benoni
Sean Philips	Nigeria	105*	64	9	4	Eswatini	Willowmoore Park A Field, Benoni
Sean Philips	Nigeria	80*	55	5	4	Tanzania	Willowmoore Park, Benoni
Faisal Rana	Botswana	78*	54	9	1	Eswatini	Willowmoore Park A Field, Benoni
Naeem Gull	Eswatini	66	48	8	3	Ghana	Willowmoore Park A Field, Benoni

=== Most wickets ===
The following table contains the five leading wicket-takers.

Player	Team	Wkts	Mts	Ave	S/R	Econ	BBI
Vincent Ateak	Ghana	15	8	6.40	12.0	3.20	3/9
Olalekan Awolowo	Nigeria	12	6	6.50	7.9	4.92	5/24
Mehul Patel	Malawi	11	6	10.18	10.3	5.89	4/14
Benson Mwita	Tanzania	11	8	12.36	15.2	4.85	2/14
Omar Ali	Botswana	11	8	12.63	15.8	4.79	4/10

=== Best bowling figures ===
This table lists the top five players with the best bowling figures.

Player	Team	Overs	Figures	Opponent	Ground
Olalekan Awolowo	Nigeria	3.0	5/24	Ghana	Willowmoore Park B Field, Benoni
Omar Ali	Botswana	4.0	4/10	Sierra Leone	Willowmoore Park B Field, Benoni
Olalekan Awolowo	Nigeria	4.0	4/11	Rwanda	Willowmoore Park A Field, Benoni
Endurance Ofem	Nigeria	4.0	4/14	Botswana	Willowmoore Park, Benoni
Mehul Patel	Malawi	3.0	4/14	Botswana	Willowmoore Park B Field, Benoni

== See also ==
- 2012 ICC World Twenty20 Qualifier
- World Cricket League Africa Region
