= 2014 ICC World Cricket League Division Five =

- Dates: 6 March – 13 March 2014
- Administrator: International Cricket Council
- Cricket format: Limited-overs (50 overs)
- Tournament format(s): Round-robin and Knockout
- Host: Malaysia
- Participants: 6
- Matches: 18

The 2014 ICC World Cricket League Division Five was a cricket tournament that took place from 6–13 March 2014. It formed part of the ICC World Cricket League and qualification for the 2019 Cricket World Cup.

== Teams ==
The teams that took part in the tournament were decided according to the results of the 2013 ICC World Cricket League Division Six, the 2012 ICC World Cricket League Division Four and the 2012 ICC World Cricket League Division Five.

Team	Last outcome
Malaysia	Relegated from 2012 ICC World Cricket League Division Four after finishing 5th
Tanzania	Relegated from 2012 ICC World Cricket League Division Four after finishing 6th
Guernsey	Still from 2012 ICC World Cricket League Division Five after finishing 3rd
Cayman Islands	Still from 2012 ICC World Cricket League Division Five after finishing 4th
Jersey	Promoted from 2013 ICC World Cricket League Division Six after finishing 1st
Nigeria	Promoted from 2013 ICC World Cricket League Division Six after finishing 2nd

== Squads ==
Cayman Islands	Guernsey	Jersey	Malaysia	Nigeria	Tanzania
Ronald Ebanks (C); Omar Bryan; Darren Cato; Kervin Ebanks; Steve Gordon; Ainsley Hall (Wk); Alessandro Morris; Ricardo Roach; Ian Rotsey; Ramon Sealy; Nicholas Sellars; Troy Taylor; Omar Willis; Conroy Wright	Jamie Nussbaumer (C); Lucas Barker; Matthew Breban; Isaac Damarell; Max Ellis; Ben Ferbrache; James Gale; David Hooper; Tom Kimber (Wk); Luke Le Tissier; Oliver Newey; William Peatfield; Lee Savident; Matthew Stokes	Peter Gough (C); Corey Bisson; Paul Connolly; Andy Dewhurst; Edward Farley (Wk); Luke Gallichan; Anthony Hawkins-Kay; Jonty Jenner; Tom Minty; Dean Morrison; Nathaniel Watkins; Charles Perchard; Ben Stevens	Ahmed Faiz (C); Suhan Alagaratnam; Anwar Arudin; Anwar Rahman; Khizar Hayat; Fikri Rosdi; Hassan Mohammed; Nasir Shafiq; Nazril Rahman; Pavandeep Singh; Hiran Ralalage; Shafiq Sharif (Wk); Shahrulnizam Yusof; Suharril Fetri	Kunle Adegbola (C); Saheed Akolade; Olajide Bejide; Endurance Ofem; Joshua Ogunlola; Emmanuel Okwudili; Dotun Olatunji; Segun Olayinka; Oluseye Olympio; Ademola Onikoyi; Chimezie Onwuzulike; Osita Onwuzulike; Leke Oyede; Ricky Sharma (Wk)	Hamisi Abdallah (C); Seif Khalifa; Rashidi Amiri; Arshan Jasani; Salum Jumbe; Kishen Kamania; Ally Kimote; Enjo Kiongozi; Riziki Kiseto; Nasibu Mapunda (Wk); Kassim Nassoro; Benson Mwita; Abhik Patwa; Khalil Rehmtullah

== Fixtures ==
=== Round robin ===
==== Points table ====
Pos	Team	Pld	W	L	T	NR	Pts	NRR	
1	Jersey	5	5	0	0	0	10	1.311	Met in the final and promoted to Division Four for 2014
2	Malaysia	5	4	1	0	0	8	2.151	Met in the final and promoted to Division Four for 2014
3	Tanzania	5	3	2	0	0	6	−0.616	Met in the 3rd place playoff and remained to Division Five for 2016
4	Nigeria	5	2	3	0	0	4	−0.626	Met in the 3rd place playoff and remained to Division Five for 2016
5	Cayman Islands	5	1	4	0	0	2	−1.425	Met in the 5th place playoff and relegated to Division Six for 2015
6	Guernsey	5	0	5	0	0	0	−0.626	Met in the 5th place playoff and relegated to Division Six for 2015

==== Matches ====
6 March
Scorecard

Cayman Islands; 140/9 (50 overs)	v	Guernsey; 107 (37.2 overs)
Ainsley Hall 45 (68); Max Ellis 4/12 (10 overs)		Lucas Barker 37 (73); Kervin Ebanks 5/19 (8 overs)

Cayman Islands won by 33 runs
Royal Selangor Club, Kuala Lumpur
Umpires: Batumalai Ramani (Malaysia) and Ashwani Rana (Thailand)
Player of the match: Kervin Ebanks (Cayman Islands)

- Guernsey won the toss and elected to field

6 March
Scorecard

Malaysia; 318/5 (50 overs)	v	Tanzania; 196 (49 overs)
Ahmed Faiz 78 (94); Benson Nyaikini 2/42 (10 overs)		Khalil Rehmtullah 51 (64); Hassan Mohammed 4/36 (9 overs)

Malaysia won by 122 runs
Kinrara Academy Oval, Kuala Lumpur
Umpires: Rockie D'Mello (Kenya) and Vineet Kulkarni (India)
Player of the match: Shafiq Sharif (Malaysia)

- Malaysia won the toss and elected to bat

6 March
Scorecard

Nigeria; 175 (46 overs)	v	Jersey; 235/8 (50 overs)
Peter Gough 66 (97); Joshua Ogunlola 3/46 (10 overs)		Dotun Olatunji 37 (41); Ben Stevens 3/16 (10 overs)

Jersey won by 60 runs
Bayuemas Oval, Kuala Lumpur
Umpires: Iftikhar Ali (United Arab Emirates) and Alu Kapa (Papua New Guinea)
Player of the match: Peter Gough (Jersey)

- Nigeria won the toss and elected to field

7 March
Scorecard

Jersey; 266/4 (50 overs)	v	Tanzania; 164 (41.4 overs)
Nathaniel Watkins 73 (102); Benson Nyaikini 2/41 (10 overs)		Benson Nyaikini 48 (37); Cornelis Bodenstein 4/37 (7 overs)

Jersey won by 102 runs
Kinrara Academy Oval, Kuala Lumpur
Umpires: Kathy Cross (New Zealand) and Rockie D'Mello (Kenya)
Player of the match: Nathaniel Watkins (Jersey)

- Jersey won the toss and elected to bat

7 March
Scorecard

Malaysia; 333/5 (50 overs)	v	Cayman Islands; 120 (34.4 overs)
Nasir Shafiq 151* (149); Troy Taylor 3/55 (10 overs)		Ricardo Roach 22(71); Hassan Mohammed 4/10 (2.4 overs)

Malaysia won by 213 runs
Bayuemas Oval, Kuala Lumpur
Umpires: Iftikhar Ali (United Arab Emirates) and Ashwani Rana (Thailand)
Player of the match: Nasir Shafiq (Malaysia)

- Cayman Islands won the toss and elected to field

7 March
Scorecard

Nigeria; 194/8 (49.1 overs)	v	Guernsey; 192/9 (50 overs)
Lucas Barker 45 (87); Saheed Akolade 3/29 (8 overs)		Dotun Olatunji 40 (41); Jamie Nussbaumer 3/26 (10 overs)

Nigeria won by 2 wickets
Royal Selangor Club, Kuala Lumpur
Umpires: Vineet Kulkarni (India) and Batumalai Ramani (Malaysia)
Player of the match: Endurance Ofem (Nigeria)

- Guernsey won the toss and elected to bat

9 March
Scorecard

Cayman Islands; 204 (50 overs)	v	Nigeria; 205/3 (40.4 overs)
Ramon Sealy 58 (79); Saheed Akolade 3/42 (10 overs)		Endurance Ofem 90 (97); Troy Taylor 2/42 (8.4 overs)

Nigeria won by 7 wickets
Kinrara Academy Oval, Kuala Lumpur
Umpires: Iftikhar Ali (United Arab Emirates) and Batumalai Ramani (Malaysia)
Player of the match: Endurance Ofem (Nigeria)

- Nigeria won the toss and elected to field

9 March
Scorecard

Guernsey; 115 (41.1 overs)	v	Tanzania; 163 (48.2 overs)
Hamisi Abdallah 27 (52); Jamie Nussbaumer 3/25 (9 overs)		Isaac Damarell 29 (51); Benson Nyaikini 3/14 (10 overs)

Tanzania won by 48 runs
Bayuemas Oval, Kuala Lumpur
Umpires: Alu Kapa (Papua New Guinea) and Vineet Kulkarni (India)
Player of the match: Benson Nyaikini (Tanzania)

- Guernsey won the toss and elected to field

9 March
Scorecard

Malaysia; 202/9 (50 overs)	v	Jersey; 203/2 (43.0 overs)
Khizar Hayat 42 (61); Anthony Hawkins-Kay 4/24 (10 overs)		Ben Stevens 83 (79); Hiran Brahman Ralalage 1/23 (7 overs)

Jersey won by 8 wickets
Royal Selangor Club, Kuala Lumpur
Umpires: Kathy Cross (New Zealand) and Rockie D'Mello (Kenya)
Player of the match: Ben Stevens (Jersey)

- Malaysia won the toss and elected to bat

10 March
Scorecard

Cayman Islands; 157 (32.5 overs)	v	Jersey; 279/6 (50 overs)
Conroy Wright 79* (51); Tom Minty 4/32 (7.5 overs)		Edward Farley 86* (77); Troy Taylor 2/52 (8 overs)

Jersey won by 122 runs
Bayuemas Oval, Kuala Lumpur
Umpires: Kathy Cross (New Zealand) and Alu Kapa (Papua New Guinea)
Player of the match: Ben Stevens (Jersey)

- Jersey won the toss and elected to bat

10 March
Scorecard

Malaysia; 286/7 (50 overs)	v	Guernsey; 223/8 (50 overs)
Ahmed Faiz 103 (82); Jamie Nussbaumer 3/36 (6 overs)		Lee Savident 76(79); Khizar Hayat 2/34 (10 overs)

Malaysia won by 63 runs
Kinrara Academy Oval, Kuala Lumpur
Umpires: Iftikhar Ali (United Arab Emirates) and Vineet Kulkarni (India)
Player of the match: Ahmed Faiz (Malaysia)

- Malaysia won the toss and elected to bat

10 March
Scorecard

Nigeria; 206 (48.1 overs)	v	Tanzania; 216 (50 overs)
Kunle Adegbola 41(77); Khalil Rehmtullah 3/34 (8 overs)		Riziki Kiseto 47 (60); Saheed Akolade 2/32 (10 overs)

Tanzania won by 10 runs
Royal Selangor Club, Kuala Lumpur
Umpires: Rockie D'Mello (Kenya) and Ashwani Rana (Thailand)
Player of the match: Kunle Adegbola (Nigeria)

- Nigeria won the toss and elected to field

12 March
Scorecard

Cayman Islands; 126 (39.1 overs)	v	Tanzania; 138 (44.1 overs)
Darren Cato 31 (57); Benson Nyaikini 4/14 (4.1 overs)		Nasibu Mapunda 27 (28); Ronald Ebanks 4/44 (10 overs)

Tanzania won by 12 runs
Royal Selangor Club, Kuala Lumpur
Umpires: Kathy Cross (New Zealand) and Batumalai Ramani (Malaysia)
Player of the match: Hamisi Abdallah (Tanzania)

- Tanzania won the toss and elected to bat

12 March
Scorecard

Guernsey; 217 (50 overs)	v	Jersey; 220/9 (49.0 overs)
Oliver Newey 56 (93); Anthony Hawkins-Kay 3/44 (8 overs)		Dean Morrison 63 (85); Luke Le Tissier 4/36 (8 overs)

Jersey won by 1 wicket
Kinrara Academy Oval, Kuala Lumpur
Umpires: Rockie D'Mello (Kenya) and Alu Kapa (Papua New Guinea)
Player of the match: Dean Morrison (Jersey)

- Guernsey won the toss and elected to bat

12 March
Scorecard

Malaysia; 115/1 (21.1 overs)	v	Nigeria; 113 (32.2 overs)
Ahmed Faiz 60 (72); Joshua Ogunlola 1/30 (4 overs)		Olajide Bejide 24 (33); Suharril Fetri 3/17 (6.2 overs)

Malaysia won by 9 wickets
Bayuemas Oval, Kuala Lumpur
Umpires: Vineet Kulkarni (India) and Ashwani Rana (Thailand)
Player of the match: Ahmed Faiz (Malaysia)

- Nigeria won the toss and elected to bat

=== Playoffs ===
==== 5th place playoff ====
13 March
Scoreboard

Cayman Islands; 222 (50 overs)	v	Guernsey; 226/3 (36.1 overs)
Omar Willis 59 (79); Max Ellis 3/44 (10 overs)		Lee Savident 98* (104); Conroy Wright 1/14 (3 overs)

Guernsey won by 7 wickets
Bayuemas Oval, Kuala Lumpur
Umpires: Iftikhar Ali (United Arab Emirates) and Batumalai Ramani (Malaysia)
Player of the match: Lee Savident (Guernsey)

- Cayman Islands won the toss and elected to bat

==== 3rd place playoff ====
13 March
Scoreboard

Nigeria; 225/9 (50 overs)	v	Tanzania; 229/7 (47.0 overs)
Olajide Bejide 106 (129); Hamisi Abdallah 4/34 (10 overs)		Kassim Nassoro 66* (106); Oluseye Olympio 3/27 (9 overs)

Tanzania won by 3 wickets
Royal Selangor Club, Kuala Lumpur
Umpires: Rockie D'Mello (Kenya) and Alu Kapa (Papua New Guinea)
Player of the match: Olajide Bejide (Nigeria)

- Nigeria won the toss and elected to bat

==== Final ====
13 March
Scoreboard

Jersey; 247/8 (50 overs)	v	Malaysia; 176 (44.4 overs)
Nat Watkins 116 (138); Khizar Hayat 5/62 (10 overs)		Shafiq Sharif 62 (77); Ben Stevens 3/42 (10 overs)

Jersey won by 71 runs
Kinrara Academy Oval, Kuala Lumpur
Umpires: Kathy Cross (New Zealand) and Ashwani Rana (Thailand)

- Jersey won the toss and elected to bat

== Statistics ==
=== Most runs ===
The top five highest run scorers (total runs) are included in this table.

Player	Team	Runs	Inns	Avg	S/R	HS	100s	50s
Ben Stevens	Jersey	403	6	67.16	79.96	84	0	5
Nasir Shafiq	Malaysia	346	6	86.50	86.93	151*	1	2
Ahmed Faiz	Malaysia	317	6	63.40	82.55	103	1	2
Lee Savident	Guernsey	249	5	62.25	81.10	98*	0	2
Nat Watkins	Jersey	224	6	37.33	66.86	116	1	1

=== Most wickets ===
The following table contains the five leading wicket-takers.

Player	Team	Wkts	Mts	Ave	S/R	Econ	BBI
Khizar Hayat	Malaysia	15	6	11.46	21.2	3.24	5/62
Benson Nyaikini	Tanzania	14	6	13.21	20.6	3.84	4/14
Anthony Hawkins-Kay	Jersey	14	6	13.85	23.8	3.48	4/24
Hassan Mohammed	Malaysia	14	6	16.28	19.5	4.99	4/10
Ben Stevens	Jersey	13	6	15.07	25.2	3.58	3/16

== Final Placings ==
After the conclusion of the tournament the teams were distributed as follows:

Pos	Team	Status
1st	Jersey	Promoted to Division Four for 2014
2nd	Malaysia	Promoted to Division Four for 2014
3rd	Tanzania	Remained in Division Five for 2016
4th	Nigeria	Remained in Division Five for 2016
5th	Guernsey	Relegated to Division Six for 2015
6th	Cayman Islands	Relegated to Division Six for 2015
