= 2014 Africa Twenty20 Division Two =

2014 ICC Africa Division Two
- Dates: 20 – 24 September 2014
- Administrator: ICC Africa
- Cricket format: 20-over
- Tournament format: Double round-robin
- Host: South Africa
- Champions: Ghana
- Participants: 6
- Matches: 15
- Most runs: (Eswatini) Estian Sauerman (174)
- Most wickets: (Zambia) James Zimba (Ghana) Vincent Ateak (9)

The 2014 ICC Africa Twenty20 Division Two was an international 20-over cricket tournament held in Benoni, South Africa, from 20 to 24 September 2014. All matches were played at the Willowmoore Park complex.

The tournament, part of the qualification process for the 2016 World Twenty20, was contested by six members of the International Cricket Council (ICC) – two associate members and four affiliate members. The number of participants was reduced by two from the previous tournament in 2012. Of the competing teams, Nigeria had been relegated from 2013 Africa Division One and Swaziland promoted from 2014 Africa Division Three, with the other four qualifying by virtue of their position in the last Division Two tournament. The six teams played each other in a round-robin over a period of five days. Ghana and Zambia finished equal on points, but Ghana had a better net run rate, thus winning the tournament and qualifying for the 2015 Division Two tournament.

== Points table ==
| Qualified for 2015 Africa Division One |
| Qualified for 2016 Africa Division Two |

| Team | Pld | W | L | A | NR | Pts | NRR |
|---|---|---|---|---|---|---|---|
| Ghana | 5 | 4 | 1 | 0 | 0 | 8 | +2.227 |
| Zambia | 5 | 4 | 1 | 0 | 0 | 8 | +1.508 |
| Nigeria | 5 | 3 | 2 | 0 | 0 | 6 | +0.592 |
| Seychelles | 5 | 2 | 3 | 0 | 0 | 4 | –0.365 |
| Eswatini | 5 | 2 | 3 | 0 | 0 | 4 | –0.824 |
| Mozambique | 5 | 0 | 5 | 0 | 0 | 0 | –3.338 |
Source: CricketArchive

== Fixtures ==
20 September
Scorecard

| Ghana; 140/7 (20 overs) | v | Seychelles; 133/7 (20 overs) |

Ghana won by 7 runs
Willowmoore Park, Benoni

20 September
Scorecard

| Mozambique; 57 (18.1 overs) | v | Zambia; 58/1 (5.5 overs) |

Zambia won by 9 wickets
Willowmoore Park, Benoni

20 September
Scorecard

| Nigeria; 120 (18.3 overs) | v | Eswatini; 110/8 (20 overs) |

Nigeria won by 10 runs
Willowmoore Park, Benoni

21 September
Scorecard

| Nigeria; 105 (18.4 overs) | v | Mozambique; 77/9 (20 overs) |

Nigeria won by 28 runs
Willowmoore Park, Benoni

21 September
Scorecard

| Ghana; 150/8 (20 overs) | v | Eswatini; 90 (18.4 overs) |

Ghana won by 60 runs
Willowmoore Park, Benoni

21 September
Scorecard

| Zambia; 176/4 (20 overs) | v | Seychelles; 121/8 (20 overs) |

Zambia won by 55 runs
Willowmoore Park, Benoni

22 September
Scorecard

| Ghana; 141/6 (20 overs) | v | Nigeria; 110 (18 overs) |

Ghana won by 31 runs
Willowmoore Park, Benoni

22 September
Scorecard

| Seychelles; 149/7 (20 overs) | v | Mozambique; 125/7 (20 overs) |

Seychelles won by 24 runs
Willowmoore Park, Benoni

22 September
Scorecard

| Eswatini; 89 (18.4 overs) | v | Zambia; 93/4 (13.2 overs) |

Zambia won by 6 wickets
Willowmoore Park, Benoni

23 September
Scorecard

| Ghana; 121/8 (20 overs) | v | Zambia; 122/3 (19 overs) |

Zambia won by 7 wickets
Willowmoore Park, Benoni

23 September
Scorecard

| Eswatini; 214/5 (20 overs) | v | Mozambique; 184 (19.4 overs) |

Swaziland won by 30 runs
Willowmoore Park, Benoni

23 September
Scorecard

| Nigeria; 151/7 (20 overs) | v | Seychelles; 155/3 (19.1 overs) |

Seychelles won by 7 wickets
Willowmoore Park, Benoni

24 September
Scorecard

| Ghana; 200/4 (20 overs) | v | Mozambique; 69 (14.4 overs) |

Ghana won by 131 runs
Willowmoore Park, Benoni

24 September
Scorecard

| Nigeria; 152/9 (20 overs) | v | Zambia; 91 (18.5 overs) |

Nigeria won by 61 runs
Willowmoore Park, Benoni

24 September
Scorecard

| Eswatini; 110 (17 overs) | v | Seychelles; 102 (19.3 overs) |

Swaziland won by 8 runs
Willowmoore Park, Benoni

== Statistics ==
=== Most runs ===
The top five run-scorers are included in this table, ranked by runs scored and then by batting average.

| Player | Team | Runs | Inns | Avg | Highest | 100s | 50s |
|---|---|---|---|---|---|---|---|
| Estian Sauerman | Eswatini | 174 | 5 | 43.50 | 109* | 1 | 0 |
| Himal Patel | Zambia | 160 | 5 | 80.00 | 61* | 0 | 2 |
| Kunle Adegbola | Nigeria | 135 | 5 | 27.00 | 68 | 0 | 1 |
| Obed Agbomadzie | Ghana | 134 | 3 | 67.00 | 81* | 0 | 1 |
| Kaleem Shah | Mozambique | 120 | 5 | 24.00 | 47 | 0 | 0 |

Source: CricHQ

=== Most wickets ===
The top five wicket-takers are listed in this table, ranked by wickets taken and then by bowling average.

| Player | Team | Overs | Wkts | Ave | SR | Econ | BBI |
|---|---|---|---|---|---|---|---|
| James Zimba | Zambia | 18.0 | 9 | 9.22 | 12.00 | 4.61 | 3/11 |
| Vincent Ateak | Ghana | 17.0 | 9 | 9.11 | 11.33 | 4.82 | 3/7 |
| Saheed Akolade | Nigeria | 17.5 | 8 | 12.38 | 13.38 | 5.55 | 3/11 |
| Sharif Yousuf | Zambia | 11.0 | 8 | 7.38 | 8.25 | 5.36 | 4/21 |
| Mohsin Bhariya | Eswatini | 17.0 | 8 | 15.63 | 12.75 | 7.35 | 2/19 |

Source: CricHQ

== See also ==
- ICC Africa Twenty20 Championship
