= ICC Africa Twenty20 Championship =

International cricket tournament

Africa Twenty20 Championship
- Administrator: ICC
- Format: 20 overs
- Tournament format: Round-robin
- Number of teams: 20 (overall)
- Current champion: Div. 1: Namibia; Div. 2: Ghana; Div. 3: Swaziland

The ICC Africa Twenty20 Championship was an international Twenty20 cricket competition that formed part of the qualification process for the ICC World Twenty20. It was contested by associate and affiliate members of the International Cricket Council (ICC) in Africa. It ran from 2011 to 2016 and comprised three divisions, which operated on a system of promotion and relegation. Each division was contested (as a standalone tournament) approximately every two years, aligning with the World Twenty20. The top two teams from the Division One tournament would be promoted to the World Twenty20 Qualifier, joining the top teams from the other regional qualifiers.

== Division One ==
The first two Division One tournaments featured five teams and were held in Kampala, Uganda. For the 2015 edition, the number of teams increased to six and was held in Benoni, South Africa (a neutral venue). Namibia did not participate in the 2013 Division One tournament as it had already qualified for the 2013 World Twenty20 Qualifier (by placing in the top six at the 2012 event).

=== Results ===
| Year | Host(s) | Venue(s) | Result | | |
| Year | Host(s) | Venue(s) | Winner | Margin | Runner-up |
|---|---|---|---|---|---|
| 2011 | Uganda | Kampala | Uganda; 149/4 (17.4 overs) | Uganda won by 6 wickets scorecard | Namibia; 148/8 (20 overs) |
| 2013 | Uganda | Kampala | Kenya +2.517 NRR | Kenya won on net run rate table | Uganda +1.784 NRR |
| 2015 | South Africa | Benoni | Namibia +2.182 NRR | Namibia won on net run rate table | Kenya +1.663 NRR |

=== Performance by team ===
Legend

- 1st – Champions
- 2nd – Runners-up
- 3rd – Third place
- ✕ – Did not participate (already qualified for World Twenty20 Qualifier)
- — Hosts

| Team | (Uganda) 2011 | (Uganda) 2013 | (South Africa) 2015 | Total |
|---|---|---|---|---|
| Botswana | — | 4th | 5th | 2 |
| Ghana | 5th | — | 4th | 2 |
| Kenya | 3rd | 1st | 2nd | 3 |
| Namibia | 2nd | ✕ | 1st | 2 |
| Nigeria | 4th | 5th | — | 2 |
| Tanzania | — | 3rd | 6th | 2 |
| Uganda | 1st | 2nd | 3rd | 3 |

== Division two ==
=== Results ===
| Year | Host(s) | Venue(s) | Result | | |
| Year | Host(s) | Venue(s) | Winner | Margin | Runner-up |
|---|---|---|---|---|---|
| 2011 | South Africa | Benoni | Nigeria; 14 points | Nigeria won on points table | Ghana; 12 points |
| 2012 | South Africa | Benoni | Botswana +1.843 NRR | Botswana won on net run rate table | Tanzania +1.675 NRR |
| 2014 | South Africa | Benoni | Ghana +2.227 NRR | Ghana won on net run rate table | Zambia +1.508 NRR |
| 2016 | South Africa | Benoni | Sierra Leone; 8 points | Sierra Leone won on points table | Mozambique; 4 points |

=== Performance by team ===
Legend

- 1st – Champions
- 2nd – Runners-up
- 3rd – Third place
- Q – Qualified
- ✕ – Did not participate (already qualified for a higher division)

| Team | (South Africa) 2011 | (South Africa) 2012 | (South Africa) 2014 | (South Africa) 2016 | Total |
|---|---|---|---|---|---|
| Botswana | 3rd | 1st | ✕ | ✕ | 2 |
| Ghana | 2nd | 4th | 1st | ✕ | 3 |
| Malawi | 9th | — | — | — | 1 |
| Mozambique | 7th | 6th | 6th | 2nd | 4 |
| Nigeria | 1st | ✕ | 3rd | ✕ | 2 |
| Rwanda | 8th | — | — | 3rd | 2 |
| Seychelles | — | 5th | 4th | ✕ | 2 |
| Sierra Leone | 5th | 8th | — | 1st | 3 |
| Eswatini | 6th | 7th | 5th | — | 3 |
| Tanzania | 4th | 2nd | ✕ | ✕ | 2 |
| Zambia | — | 3rd | 2nd | ✕ | 2 |

== Division Three ==
=== Results ===
| Year | Host(s) | Venue(s) | Result | | |
| Year | Host(s) | Venue(s) | Winner | Margin | Runner-up |
|---|---|---|---|---|---|
| 2011 | Ghana | Accra | Rwanda; 125/4 (20 overs) | Rwanda won by 8 runs scorecard | Seychelles; 117/7 (20 overs) |
| 2012 | South Africa | Benoni | Zambia; 14 points | Zambia won on points table | Seychelles; 12 points |
| 2014 | South Africa | Benoni | Eswatini +1.413 NRR | Swaziland won on net run rate table | Sierra Leone +0.729 NRR |

=== Performance by team ===
Legend

- 1st – Champions
- 2nd – Runners-up
- 3rd – Third place
- ✕ – Did not participate (already qualified for a higher division)

| Team | (Ghana) 2011 | (South Africa) 2012 | (South Africa) 2014 | Total |
|---|---|---|---|---|
| Cameroon | 6th | 7th | — | 2 |
| Eswatini | ✕ | ✕ | 1st | 1 |
| Gambia | 5th | 3rd | 4th | 3 |
| Lesotho | 3rd | — | — | 1 |
| Mali | 7th | 8th | — | 2 |
| Morocco | 4th | 6th | — | 2 |
| Rwanda | 1st | 4th | 3rd | 3 |
| Saint Helena | — | 5th | — | 1 |
| Seychelles | 2nd | 2nd | ✕ | 2 |
| Sierra Leone | ✕ | ✕ | 2nd | 1 |
| Zambia | — | 1st | ✕ | 1 |

== See also ==
- ICC Africa Under-19 Championships
- ICC Africa Women's T20 Championship
