= Thomas Kirk =

Thomas Kirk may refer to:

- Thomas Kirk (English artist) (1765–1797), English artist, book illustrator and engraver
- Thomas Kirk (botanist) (1828–1898), English-born botanist, writer and churchman in New Zealand
- Tom Kirk (cricketer) (born 1992), cricketer who plays for Guernsey
- Thomas William Kirk (1856–1936), biologist and scientific administrator from New Zealand
- Thomas Kirk (sculptor) (1781–1845), Irish sculptor
- Thomas Stewart Kirk (1848–1879), Irish sculptor
- Thomas Andrew Murray Kirk (1906–1966), Canadian Member of Parliament, 1949–1958
- Thomas James Kirk, American convicted fraudster
- TJ Kirk (Thomas James Kirk III, born 1985), American YouTube personality and author
- Thomas Henry Kirk (1873–1940), Canadian politician in the Legislative Assembly of British Columbia

== See also ==
- Tom Kirk (disambiguation)
- Tommy Kirk (1941–2021), American actor
