= 2016 ICC Africa Twenty20 Division Two =

2016 ICC Africa Division Two
- Dates: 16 – 19 April 2016
- Administrator(s): ICC Africa
- Cricket format: 20-over
- Tournament format(s): Double round-robin
- Host(s): South Africa
- Champions: Sierra Leone
- Participants: 3
- Matches: 6

The 2016 ICC Africa Twenty20 Division Two was an international 20-over cricket tournament held in Benoni, South Africa, from 16 to 19 April 2016. All matches were played at the Willowmoore Park complex. Sierra Leone were undefeated in their four matches, qualifying for Division One.

== Teams ==
Three teams competed in the tournament:

- Mozambique (6th in 2014 ICC Africa Twenty20 Division Two)
- Sierra Leone (2nd in 2014 ICC Africa Twenty20 Division Three)
- Rwanda (3rd in 2014 ICC Africa Twenty20 Division Three)

Swaziland, which placed fifth at the 2014 Division Two tournament, were disqualified from the event for fielding ineligible players in a previous competition.

== Points table ==
Source: CricHQ

Team	P	W	L	T	NR	Points	NRR
Sierra Leone	4	4	0	0	0	8	+1.905
Mozambique	4	2	2	0	0	2	–1.156
Rwanda	4	0	4	0	0	0	–0.742

Win – 2 points
Loss – 0 points
Tie or no result – 1 point

== Fixtures ==
16 April
Scorecard

Mozambique; 119 (19.2 overs)	v	Sierra Leone; 122/4 (16.5 overs)

Sierra Leone won by 6 wickets
Willowmoore Park, Benoni

16 April
Scorecard

Rwanda; 118/8 (20 overs)	v	Mozambique; 119/4 (18.3 overs)

Mozambique won by 6 wickets
Willowmoore Park, Benoni

17 April
Scorecard

Sierra Leone; 154/6 (20 overs)	v	Rwanda; 132/9 (20 overs)

Sierra Leone won by 22 runs
Willowmoore Park, Benoni

17 April
Scorecard

Sierra Leone; 177/5 (20 overs)	v	Mozambique; 98 (14 overs)

Sierra Leone won by 79 runs
Willowmoore Park, Benoni

19 April
Scorecard

Sierra Leone; 140/6 (20 overs)	v	Rwanda; 116/7 (20 overs)

Sierra Leone won by 24 runs
Willowmoore Park, Benoni

19 April
Scorecard

Mozambique; 128 (20 overs)	v	Rwanda; 126/9 (20 overs)

Mozambique won by 2 runs
Willowmoore Park, Benoni

== See also ==
- ICC Africa Twenty20 Championship
