= Saheed =

Saheed is a given name. Notable people with the name include:

- Saheed Aderinto (born 1979), Nigerian-American historian and university teacher
- Saheed Akolade (born 1993), Nigerian cricketer
- Saheed Balogun (born 1967), Nigerian actor
- Saheed Idowu (born 1990), Congolese table tennis player
- Saheed Kazeem (born 2001), Irish-born Nigerian games designer, model and poet
- Saheed Mohamed (born 1976), Cayman Islands cricketer
- Saheed Mustapha (born 1994), German footballer
- Saheed Osupa (born 1969), Nigerian musician and actor
