= Tom Kirk =

Tom Kirk may refer to:

- Tom Kirk (rugby league) (1916–1994), Australian rugby league footballer
- Tom Kirk (cricketer) (born 1992), cricketer for Guernsey
- Tom Kirk (baseball) (1927–1974), baseball player with the Philadelphia Athletics

== See also ==
- Thomas Kirk (disambiguation)
- Tommy Kirk (1941–2021), American former actor and later a businessman
