= Arun Dagar =

Tanzanian cricketer (born 1992)

Personal information
- Born: 17 April 1992 (age 34)

International information
- National side: Tanzania
- Source: Cricinfo, 4 May 2019

Arun Dagar (born 17 April 1992) is a Tanzanian cricketer. He was named in Tanzania's squad for the 2016 ICC World Cricket League Division Five tournament in Jersey, playing in six matches.
