= Enjo Kiongozi =

Tanzanian cricketer (born 1990)

Personal information
- Born: 27 March 1990 (age 36)

International information
- National side: Tanzania
- Source: Cricinfo, 19 July 2015

Enjo Kiongozi (born 27 March 1990) is a Tanzanian cricketer. He played in the 2014 ICC World Cricket League Division Five tournament.
