= Louis van der Westhuizen =

Namibian cricketer (born 1988)

Personal information
- Full name: Louis Petrus van der Westhuizen
- Born: 31 March 1988 (age 38); Windhoek, South West Africa
- Batting: Left-handed
- Bowling: Slow left-arm orthodox

International information
- National side: Namibia (2006–2018)

Career statistics
| Competition | FC | LA | T20 |
|---|---|---|---|
| Matches | 39 | 88 | 45 |
| Runs scored | 1,555 | 1,400 | 917 |
| Batting average | 23.56 | 18.66 | 21.32 |
| 100s/50s | 0/10 | 0/8 | 2/4 |
| Top score | 85* | 97 | 145 |
| Balls bowled | 2,578 | 2,174 | 791 |
| Wickets | 36 | 65 | 47 |
| Bowling average | 38.11 | 27.49 | 18.87 |
| 5 wickets in innings | 1 | 0 | 0 |
| 10 wickets in match | 0 | 0 | 0 |
| Best bowling | 5/90 | 4/14 | 3/11 |
| Catches/stumpings | 13/– | 37/– | 7/– |
- Source: CricketArchive, 10 October 2019

Louis van der Westhuizen (born 31 March 1988) is a Namibian cricketer. He is a left-handed batsman and a slow left-arm bowler. He has played first-class cricket for the senior Namibian cricket team since 2006, having previously lined up for the Under-19s. He made his first-class cricket debut on 11 May 2006, for Namibia against Scotland in the 2006–07 ICC Intercontinental Cup.

Van der Westhuizen played for the Namibians in the Under-19s World Cup in 2006. Generally speaking, van der Westhuizen occupies the position of opening batsman for the Namibian side in limited-overs cricket. He was also part of the Namibian Under-19 team which won the Under-19 African Championship in 2007.

Van der Westhuizen has had success as a batsman in the Twenty20 format of the game. Playing against Kenya in a Twenty20 match, he scored 145 runs from 50 balls, then the third-highest individual score of all time in top level Twenty20. He also scored an innings of 159*, with 16 sixes, against Kenya in Kampala during the 2011 ICC World Cricket League Africa Region Twenty20 Division One tournament (which is not considered a top-level Twenty20 tournament).

In January 2018, he was named in Namibia's squad for the 2018 ICC World Cricket League Division Two tournament.
