= Max Ellis (cricketer) =

Guernsey cricketer (born 1991)

Personal information
- Born: 29 September 1991 (age 35)

International information
- National side: Guernsey
- Source: Cricinfo, 19 July 2015

Max Ellis (born 29 September 1991) is a cricketer who plays for Guernsey. Known for this slow left-arm orthodox bowling, he has also represented Guernsey at the Under-15, Under-17 and Under-19 levels.

He played in the 2014 ICC World Cricket League Division Five tournament. In May 2015 he participated in the 2015 ICC Europe Division One tournament.

He played in the 2016 ICC World Cricket League Division Five tournament, taking 10 wickets in six matches.
