= Ricardo Roach (cricketer) =

Caymanian cricketer (born 1987)

Personal information
- Born: 27 July 1987 (age 39)

International information
- National side: Cayman Islands
- Source: Cricinfo, 19 July 2015

Ricardo Roach (born 27 July 1987) is a Caymanian cricketer. He played in the 2014 ICC World Cricket League Division Five tournament.
