= Nicholas Sellars =

Caymanian cricketer (born 1981)

Personal information
- Born: 17 May 1981 (age 45)

International information
- National side: Cayman Islands
- Source: Cricinfo, 19 July 2015

Nicholas Sellars (born 17 May 1981) is a Caymanian cricketer. He played in the 2014 ICC World Cricket League Division Five tournament.
