= Ben Kynman =

Jersey cricketer (born 1995)

Personal information
- Born: 18 April 1995 (age 31)
- Batting: Right-handed
- Bowling: Right-arm fast-medium

International information
- National side: Jersey (2013–2015)

Career statistics
Competition	T20
Matches	1
Runs scored	—
Batting average	—
100s/50s	—
Top score	—
Balls bowled	24
Wickets	0
Bowling average	–
5 wickets in innings	–
10 wickets in match	–
Best bowling	–
Catches/stumpings	1/–
- Source: CricketArchive, 11 July 2015

Ben Kynman (born 18 April 1995) is an international cricketer who plays for Jersey. He made his senior debut for the team in 2013, and at the 2015 World Twenty20 Qualifier made his debut in full Twenty20 matches.

A native of the island, Kynman played for Jersey teams at various underage European tournaments, most notably the ICC Europe Under-19 Championships. A right-arm fast-medium bowler, his senior debut came against a touring Marylebone Cricket Club (MCC) team in May 2013, with his 2013 season also including appearances at the European T20 Championship and a single game (against Argentina) at the World Cricket League Division Six tournament. Kynman's only international appearance during the 2014 season was in an inter-insular match against Guernsey, where he took 2/18. However, he did have a successful season for his club side, Farmers–Caesareans, and was named "bowler of the year" in Jersey's Premier League. At the 2015 European Twenty20 Championship, Kynman managed only one wicket from his five matches, finishing with a bowling average of 100.00 and an economy rate of 7.14. Despite this, he was retained in Jersey's squad for the 2015 World Twenty20 Qualifier in Ireland and Scotland, and went on to make his full Twenty20 debut in the opening match, against Hong Kong. Selected again for the 2016 ICC World Cricket League Division Four matches held in Los Angeles.

He was the leading wicket-taker in the 2016 ICC World Cricket League Division Five, with a total of 15 dismissals during the tournament.

In August 2018, he was named in Jersey's squad for the 2018–19 ICC World Twenty20 Europe Qualifier tournament in the Netherlands.
