= Noorul Riaz =

Omani cricketer (born 1979)

Personal information
- Born: 9 December 1979 (age 46); Madurai, Tamil Nadu India

International information
- National side: Oman
- Source: ESPNcricinfo, 22 May 2016

Noorul Riaz (born 9 December 1979) is an Indian-born cricketer who plays for the Oman national cricket team. He played in the 2016 ICC World Cricket League Division Five tournament.
