= Sean Phillips (cricketer) =

South African cricketer (born 1980)

Personal information
- Born: 11 April 1980 (age 46); Harare, Zimbabwe

International information
- National side: Nigeria (2011–12)

Head coaching information
- Years: Team
- 2011–2012: Nigeria
- Source: Cricinfo, 1 December 2020

Sean Phillips (born 11 April 1980) is a South African cricket coach and former player. He was playing coach of the Nigeria national cricket team from 2011 to 2012.

Phillips was born in Harare, Zimbabwe. He attended John Ross College in Richards Bay, South Africa. He played in one first-class and one List A match for Boland in 2004.

In 2007, Phillips moved to Nigeria where he was contracted by the Nigeria Cricket Federation as coach of the national under-19 cricket team. He coached the team to victory in Division Two of the 2010 ICC Africa Under-19 Championships, winning promotion to Division One. He was also coach of the Ibeju-Lekki Cricket Club in Lagos.

Phillips was appointed playing coach of Nigeria in 2011 after meeting ICC residency qualifications. He led Nigeria to victory at the 2011 ICC Africa Twenty20 Division Two tournament in South Africa, including a man of the match performance against Sierra Leone with 109 not out from 59 balls and 4/17 with the ball.

He later established FP Elite Cricket Academy in Cape Town.

== See also ==
- List of Boland representative cricketers
