= Ashish Kamania =

Tanzanian cricketer (born 1990)

Personal information
- Born: 28 March 1990 (age 36)

International information
- National side: Tanzania
- Source: Cricinfo, 4 May 2019

Ashish Kamania (born 28 March 1990) is a Tanzanian cricketer. He was named in Tanzania's squad for the 2016 ICC World Cricket League Division Five tournament in Jersey, playing in four matches.
