= Hassan Mohammed (cricketer) =

Malaysian cricketer (born 1980)

Personal information
- Born: 20 January 1980 (age 46)

International information
- National side: Malaysia
- Source: Cricinfo, 19 July 2015

Hassan Mohammed (born 20 January 1980) is a Malaysian cricketer. He played in the 2014 ICC World Cricket League Division Five tournament.
