= Mehul Patel =

Indian cricketer (born 1989)

Mehul Patel (born January 18, 1989) is an Indian right-arm bowler who plays cricket for Gujarat.
