= Arthur Ziraba =

Ugandan cricketer (born 1989)

Personal information
- Full name: Arthur Ziraba
- Born: 8 August 1989 (age 37); Mengo, Kampala
- Batting: Right-handed
- Role: Wicket-keeper

Domestic team information
- Years: Team
- 2011–2013: Nile Knights
- Source: CricketArchive, 16 May 2016

Arthur Ziraba (born 8 August 1989 in Mengo, Kampala Uganda) is a Ugandan cricketer known for his role as a wicketkeeper and batsman in both domestic Ugandan cricket and for the Uganda national cricket team(the Cricket Cranes). has played a first-class and a List A as well as 11 Twenty20 matches for Uganda national cricket team.

== Early life and background ==
Ziraba wa born and raised in Mengo, a neighborhood in Kampala, Uganda. His early cricket development came through Uganda's school and club cricket system where he showed promise as a reliable wicket-keeper and right-handed batsman.

== Domestic career ==
Arthur Ziraba has played club cricket in Uganda's domestic leagues including representing Wanderers Cricket Club in national competitions. In school and club competitions, he was noted for his dependable wicket-keeping and useful constributions with the bat. For example, he was highlighted as one of the best fielders in school-level competitions, earning praise for his dismissals behind the stumps.

He also played in National Twenty20 competitions for Wanderers, where reports describe him keeping his side competitive with a combination of batting and wicket-keeping performances. Ziraba has occasionally been deployed as an opening batsman in domestic cricket matches, demonstrating versatility within different match situations.

== See also ==
- Cricket in Uganda
- Hamza Almuzahim
- Davis Arinaitwe
- Zephania Arinaitwe
