= 2015 Africa Twenty20 Division One =

2015 ICC Africa Twenty20 Championship
- Dates: 27 – 31 March 2015
- Administrator: ICC Africa
- Cricket format: 20-over
- Tournament format: Round-robin
- Host: South Africa
- Champions: Namibia (1st title)
- Participants: 6
- Matches: 15
- Player of the series: (Kenya) James Ngoche
- Most runs: (Namibia) Gerrie Snyman (138)
- Most wickets: (Kenya) James Ngoche (11)

The 2015 ICC Africa Twenty20 Championship was a cricket tournament held in Benoni, South Africa, from 27 to 31 March 2015. All matches were played at the Willowmoore Park complex.

Namibia won the tournament (its first) on net run rate from Kenya, with both teams progressing to the 2015 World Twenty20 Qualifier in Ireland and Scotland. Two other African sides, South Africa and Zimbabwe, are ICC full members, and thus qualify directly for the World Twenty20. Namibian Gerrie Snyman and Kenyan James Ngoche led the tournament in runs and wickets, respectively, and Ngoche was Player of the Tournament.

The 2015 event was the third edition of the ICC Africa Twenty20 Championship's Division One, instituted prior to the 2012 World Twenty20 Qualifier. It was held in South Africa for the first time, with the two previous editions held in Uganda. Six teams participated, each playing each other once in a round-robin. Five of the teams were associate members of the ICC, with Ghana the only affiliate member at the tournament.

== Points table ==
Pos	Team	Pld	W	L	T	NR	Pts	NRR
1	Namibia	5	4	1	0	0	8	2.182
2	Kenya	5	4	1	0	0	8	1.663
3	Uganda	5	3	2	0	0	6	0.612
4	Ghana	5	3	2	0	0	6	−1.450
5	Botswana	5	1	4	0	0	2	−1.259
6	Tanzania	5	0	5	0	0	0	−1.774

Source: CricHQ

Won – 2 points

Lost – 0 points

Tie or No Result – 1 point

== Fixtures ==
27 March
Scorecard

Botswana; 103/7 (20.0)	v	Kenya; 106/4 (14.2)

Kenya won by 6 wickets
Willowmoore Park, Benoni

27 March
Scorecard

Tanzania; 128/7 (20.0)	v	Uganda; 129/2 (14.4)

Uganda won by 8 wickets
Willowmoore Park, Benoni

27 March
Scorecard

Namibia; 157/4 (20.0)	v	Ghana; 67/6 (20.0)

Namibia won by 90 runs
Willowmoore Park, Benoni

28 March
Scorecard

Botswana; 88 (19.2)	v	Namibia; 149/5 (20.0)

Namibia won by 61 runs
Willowmoore Park, Benoni

28 March
Scorecard

Ghana; 102/5 (17.1)	v	Tanzania; 100/8 (20.0)

Ghana won by 5 wickets
Willowmoore Park, Benoni

28 March
Scorecard

Uganda; 81 (17)	v	Kenya; 82/2 (14.4)

Kenya won by 8 wickets
Willowmoore Park, Benoni

29 March
Scorecard

Namibia; 142/8 (20 overs)	v	Tanzania; 100/9 (20 overs)

Namibia won by 42 runs
Willowmoore Park, Benoni

29 March
Scorecard

Uganda; 115 (20 overs)	v	Botswana; 57 (16.4 overs)

Uganda won by 58 runs
Willowmoore Park, Benoni

29 March
Scorecard

Kenya; 131/9 (20 overs)	v	Ghana; 53 (15.1 overs)

Kenya won by 78 runs
Willowmoore Park, Benoni

30 March
Scorecard

Namibia; 144/8 (20 overs)	v	Uganda; 147/8 (19.4 overs)

Uganda won by 2 wickets
Willowmoore Park, Benoni

30 March
Scorecard

Kenya; 77/2 (13.5 overs)	v	Tanzania; 73/7 (20 overs)

Kenya won by 8 wickets
Willowmoore Park, Benoni

30 March
Scorecard

Botswana; 117/8 (20 overs)	v	Ghana; 118/6 (19.2 overs)

Ghana won by 4 wickets
Willowmoore Park, Benoni

31 March
Scorecard

Namibia; 166/9 (20 overs)	v	Kenya; 136/8 (20 overs)

Namibia won by 30 runs
Willowmoore Park, Benoni

31 March
Scorecard

Ghana; 74/9 (20 overs)	v	Uganda; 69 (12.5 overs)

Ghana won by 5 runs
Willowmoore Park, Benoni

31 March
Scorecard

Botswana; 108/9 (20 overs)	v	Tanzania; 73 (17.3 overs)

Botswana won by 35 runs
Willowmoore Park, Benoni

== Statistics ==
=== Most runs ===
The top five runscorers are included in this table, ranked by runs scored and then by batting average.

Player	Team	Runs	Inns	Avg	Highest	100s	50s
Gerrie Snyman	Namibia	138	5	27.60	59	0	1
Irfan Karim	Kenya	136	5	34.00	40	0	0
Collins Obuya	Kenya	125	5	41.67	47	0	0
Raymond van Schoor	Namibia	98	3	49.00	68	0	1
Abhik Patwa	Tanzania	96	5	19.20	73	0	1

Source: CricHQ

=== Most wickets ===
The top five wicket takers are listed in this table, ranked by wickets taken and then by bowling average.

Player	Team	Overs	Wkts	Ave	SR	Econ	BBI
James Ngoche	Kenya	18.0	11	7.36	9.82	4.50	5/11
Henry Ssenyondo	Uganda	14.4	9	5.78	9.78	3.55	4/10
Kofi Bagabena	Ghana	17.0	9	10.33	11.33	5.47	3/19
Reginald Nehonde	Botswana	19.0	8	14.50	14.25	6.11	3/25
Louis Klazinga	Namibia	12.0	7	8.00	10.29	4.67	3/23

Source: CricHQ

== Final standing ==
Position	Team	Status
1	Namibia	Qualified for 2015 ICC World Twenty20 Qualifier
2	Kenya	Qualified for 2015 ICC World Twenty20 Qualifier
3	Uganda	
4	Ghana	
5	Botswana	
6	Tanzania	

== WCL Division Six qualifier ==
Along with the Twenty20 tournament, two teams, Botswana and Ghana, played each other in a one-off 50-overs match for a qualification spot in the 2015 ICC World Cricket League Division Six tournament, at present the lowest WCL division.

2 April 2015
Scorecard

Ghana; 143 (46.1 overs)	v	Botswana; 147/2 (31.4 overs)

Botswana won by 8 wickets
Willowmoore Park, Benoni

- Ghana won the toss and elected to bat.
