= Tariq Mukhtar =

Sudanese footballer

Personal information
- Full name: Tariq Mukhtar Saeed Kafi
- Date of birth: January 26, 1983 (age 43)
- Place of birth: Sudan
- Height: 1.80 m (5 ft 11 in)
- Position: Defender

Senior career*
Years	Team	Apps	(Gls)
2004-2006	Alamal SC Atbara		
2007	Al-Hilal Club		
2008-2009	Alamal SC Atbara		
2010-2011	Al-Merrikh SC		
2011-2015	Alamal SC Atbara		
2015-2016	Al-Amir SC (Bahri)		
2017	Al-Ahli SC (Halfa Aljadida)		

International career
2006-2010	Sudan	12	(1)
- * Club domestic league appearances and goals

Tariq Mukhtar Saeed (born 26 January 1983) is a Sudanese football defender who currently plays for El-Merreikh.

== Career ==
He was transferred from Almal Atbara to El-Merreikh in December 2009. Mukhtar scored his first goal for El-Merreikh in the league against Jazeerat Al Feel in the last minute in which El-Merreikh won 3:0.

== International career ==
He was a member of the Sudan national football team and scored his first national goal against Palestine in which it finished in a 1–1 draw in Omdurman.

=== International goals ===
Scores and results list Sudan's goal tally first.

No	Date	Venue	Opponent	Score	Result	Competition
1.	4 June 2010	Khartoum Stadium, Khartoum, Sudan	Palestine	1–0	1–1	Friendly
