= Duncan Allan =

Kenyan cricketer

Personal information
- Full name: Duncan Iain Allan
- Born: 14 October 1991 (age 35); Brisbane, Queensland, Australia
- Height: 6 ft 2 in (1.88 m)
- Batting: Right-handed
- Bowling: Right-arm medium-fast
- Role: Batting All-Rounder

International information
- National side: Kenya (2011–2013)
- ODI debut (cap 44): 12 September 2011 v Netherlands
- Last ODI: 2 July 2013 v Scotland
- T20I debut (cap 21): 22 February 2012 v Ireland
- Last T20I: 26 November 2013 v Canada

Domestic team information
- Years: Team
- 2010–2013: Kongonis
- 2016–present: Sandgate-Redcliffe Gators

Career statistics
Competition	ODI	T20I	FC	LA
Matches	5	10	4	9
Runs scored	71	86	127	95
Batting average	14.20	8.60	15.87	10.55
100s/50s	0/0	0/0	0/0	0/0
Top score	27	18	35	27
Balls bowled	112	56	240	214
Wickets	2	4	1	4
Bowling average	40.00	20.50	122.00	42.75
5 wickets in innings	0	0	0	0
10 wickets in match	0	0	0	0
Best bowling	1/22	2/8	1/34	2/62
Catches/stumpings	1/–	2/–	2/–	1/–
- Source: Cricinfo, 13 May 2017

Duncan Iain Allan known as Duncan 'Data' Allan (born 14 October 1991, in Brisbane, Queensland, Australia) is an Australian-born Kenyan cricketer. An all-rounder and fielder, he is considered a promising talent for the Kenyan national team.

Along with Seren Waters, Allan is expected to be part of the team that pulls Kenya from their prolonged slump following the brilliant 2003 Cricket World Cup campaign. However, he has not played any major cricket since 2014.

== Under-19 career ==
Allan was a consistent performer in the Under-19 circuit, including the African continental tournaments, the ICC U-19 World Cup Qualifier and the ICC Under-19 Cricket World Cup. He has contributed with both bat and ball, thus being considered an "all-rounder".

In the 2011 Under-19 World Cup Qualifier, Allan performed brilliantly with the bat and the ball in Kenya's otherwise hugely disappointing campaign: they failed to qualify for the tournament proper after finishing second from the bottom. However, Allan was a huge success story, finishing with 14 wickets with his medium pace and joint second highest run-scorer with 455 runs including two centuries, and winning the Player of the Tournament award. This prompted ESPN Cricinfo Magazine to pronounce him "a ray of hope in a Kenya side that doesn't had too much to smile about".

== Domestic career ==
Allan had played domestic cricket in tournaments like the East African Cup, the East Africa Elite League, the East African Premier League and the Sahara Elite League. He has played for Kenya Elite Team and played for Kongonis in the Nairobi Club Ground from 2010-2013. Allan is currently gaining a lot of recognition from Queensland selectors with his all-round success playing for the South Brisbane Magpies.

== International ==
Consistent and all-round performances in the Under-19 Level earned Allan a Cricket Kenya central contract in September 2011.

He was selected and made his international debut in the limited-overs match against Netherlands at Voorburg on 12 September 2011. He scored 27 off 44 balls on debut and took a wicket (of Tom de Grooth), while giving away 29 runs from 7 overs, currently his best-bowling figures in international level. The Dutch won by two wickets with one over spare.

In the next ODI, Allan scored just eight off 28 balls. In five overs, he gave away 22 runs while taking the wicket of Stephan Myburgh. Netherlands won by four wickets with 30 balls spare.
