= Emmanuel Okwudili =

Nigerian cricketer (born 1983)

Personal information
- Born: 24 December 1983 (age 42)

International information
- National side: Nigeria
- Source: Cricinfo, 19 July 2015

Emmanuel Okwudili (born 24 December 1983) is a Nigerian cricketer. He played in the 2014 ICC World Cricket League Division Five tournament.
