= Seif Khalifa =

Tanzanian cricketer (born 1988)

Personal information
- Born: 23 February 1988 (age 38)

International information
- National side: Tanzania
- Source: Cricinfo, 19 July 2015

Seif Khalifa (born 23 February 1988) is a Tanzanian cricketer. He played in the 2014 ICC World Cricket League Division Five tournament.
