= 2014 Africa Twenty20 Division Three =

2014 ICC Africa Division Three
- Dates: 22 – 25 March 2015
- Administrator: ICC Africa
- Cricket format: 20-over
- Tournament format: Double round-robin
- Host: South Africa
- Champions: Eswatini
- Participants: 4
- Matches: 12
- Most runs: (Eswatini) Idrees Patel (209)
- Most wickets: (Rwanda) Eric Hirwa (Rwanda) Nazeer Mohammed (12)

The 2014 ICC Africa Twenty20 Division Three was an international 20-over cricket tournament held in Benoni, South Africa, from 22 to 25 March 2014. All matches were played at the Willowmoore Park complex.

The tournament, part of the qualification process for the 2016 World Twenty20, was contested by four affiliate members of the International Cricket Council (ICC), down from eight at the previous edition in 2012. The Gambia and Rwanda, ranked third and fourth at the previous tournament, were joined by Swaziland and Sierra Leone, the bottom-ranked teams at the 2012 Division Two event. The four teams played each other twice over a period of four days, for twelve matches overall. Swaziland and Sierra Leone finished equal on points, but Swaziland won the title through their net run rate. They consequently qualified for the 2014 Division Two tournament, played later in the year at the same venue.

In February 2016, it was announced that the ICC had determined that the Swaziland Cricket Association had fielded in the tournament five players, all of Asian descent, who did not meet the eligibility criteria. This resulted in the Swazi national team being disqualified from a future tournament.

== Points table ==
Teams that qualified for 2014 Africa Division Two

Team	Pld	W	L	A	NR	Pts	NRR
Swaziland	6	4	2	0	0	8	+1.413
Sierra Leone	6	4	2	0	0	8	+0.729
Rwanda	6	3	3	0	0	6	+0.496
Gambia	6	1	5	0	0	2	–2.935
Source: CricketArchive

== Fixtures ==
22 March
Scorecard

Gambia; 112/8 (20 overs)	v	Rwanda; 113/1 (16.2 overs)

Rwanda won by 9 wickets
Willowmoore Park, Benoni

22 March
Scorecard

Sierra Leone; 136/6 (20 overs)	v	Eswatini; 73/9 (20 overs)

Sierra Leone won by 63 runs
Willowmoore Park, Benoni

22 March
Scorecard

Eswatini; 208/3 (20 overs)	v	Gambia; 122 (20 overs)

Swaziland won by 86 runs
Willowmoore Park, Benoni

22 March
Scorecard

Rwanda; 102/8 (20 overs)	v	Sierra Leone; 106/4 (18 overs)

Sierra Leone won by 6 wickets
Willowmoore Park, Benoni

23 March
Scorecard

Gambia; 99/9 (20 overs)	v	Sierra Leone; 100/3 (17.5 overs)

Sierra Leone won by 7 wickets
Willowmoore Park, Benoni

23 March
Scorecard

Eswatini; 137/6 (20 overs)	v	Rwanda; 140/4 (17.4 overs)

Rwanda won by 6 wickets
Willowmoore Park, Benoni

23 March
Scorecard

Gambia; 63 (14.4 overs)	v	Rwanda; 67/1 (7.1 overs)

Rwanda won by 9 wickets
Willowmoore Park, Benoni

23 March
Scorecard

Eswatini; 139/4 (20 overs)	v	Sierra Leone; 126/8 (20 overs)

Swaziland won by 13 runs
Willowmoore Park, Benoni

25 March
Scorecard

Eswatini; 221/3 (20 overs)	v	Gambia; 104/8 (20 overs)

Swaziland won by 117 runs
Willowmoore Park, Benoni

25 March
Scorecard

Sierra Leone; 124/5 (20 overs)	v	Rwanda; 108/7 (20 overs)

Sierra Leone won by 16 runs
Willowmoore Park, Benoni

25 March
Scorecard

Gambia; 126 (19.4 overs)	v	Sierra Leone; 117/9 (20 overs)

Gambia won by 9 runs
Willowmoore Park, Benoni

25 March
Scorecard

Eswatini; 132/9 (20 overs)	v	Rwanda; 98 (19.5 overs)

Swaziland won by 34 runs
Willowmoore Park, Benoni

== Statistics ==
=== Most runs ===
The top five run-scorers are included in this table, ranked by runs scored and then by batting average.

Player	Team	Runs	Inns	Avg	Highest	100s	50s
Idrees Patel	Eswatini	209	6	34.83	113	1	1
Estian Sauerman	Eswatini	166	6	41.50	101	1	0
Haris Rashid	Eswatini	163	6	81.50	67*	0	1
Lansana Lamin	Sierra Leone	144	6	48.00	55*	0	1
Jacob Mansaray	Sierra Leone	137	6	34.25	42	0	0

Source: CricHQ

=== Most wickets ===
The top five wicket-takers are listed in this table, ranked by wickets taken and then by bowling average.

Player	Team	Overs	Wkts	Ave	SR	Econ	BBI
Eric Hirwa	Rwanda	23.1	12	9.67	11.58	5.01	4/22
Nazeer Mohammed	Rwanda	24.0	12	10.08	12.00	5.04	4/33
Aziz Patel	Eswatini	23.0	11	12.00	12.55	5.74	4/28
Edward Marrah	Sierra Leone	21.4	10	10.60	13.00	4.89	2/4
Abass Gbla	Sierra Leone	24.0	10	11.10	14.40	4.63	4/20

Source: CricHQ
