= Kishen Kamania =

Tanzanian cricketer (born 1994)

Personal information
- Born: 11 June 1994 (age 32)

International information
- National side: Tanzania
- Source: Cricinfo, 19 July 2015

Kishen Kamania (born 11 June 1994) is a Tanzanian cricketer. He played in the 2014 ICC World Cricket League Division Five tournament.
