= Arthur Kyobe =

Ugandan cricketer (born 1988)

Personal information
- Full name: Arthur Solomon Kyobe
- Born: 29 November 1988 (age 37); Lira, Uganda
- Batting: Left-handed

International information
- National side: Uganda (2007/08–2014/15)

Career statistics
Competition	FC	LA	T20
Matches	2	29	21
Runs scored	86	575	356
Batting average	21.50	19.82	17.80
100s/50s	0/0	0/3	0/1
Top score	49	65	51*
Catches/stumpings	0/–	5/–	6/–
- Source: CricketArchive, 27 January 2025

Arthur Kyobe also known as Arthur Solomon Kyobe (born 29 November 1988) is a Ugandan cricketer, and a left - hand opening batsman who played in the 2006 Under-19 Cricket World Cup in Sri Lanka.

== Background and education ==
Kyobe was born with more children including Julius Lutwama who is a basketballer and their mother is Teddy Mukasa. He went Mengo Primary School for his primary, Jinja SS for his O' level and Makerere College School for his A' level before Joining Makerere University Business School where he graduated with a Bachelors of Science in accounting degree in 2012.

== Career ==
Kyobe is a left-handed batsman who has played first-class, one-day and Twenty20 cricket for his Uganda. In 2003, he was the captain of Uganda in the ICC East Africa Under 15 Tourney at the age of 14. In 2004, he was one of those selected to represent Uganda in a team of 14 at the 2004 International Cricket Council (ICC) Under 19 World Cup in Dhaka, Bangladesh. In July 2019, he was one of twenty-five players named in the Ugandan training squad, ahead of the Cricket World Cup Challenge League fixtures in Hong Kong.

== Awards and recognitions ==
Kyobe was voted as the cricketer of the year by Uganda Sports Press Association (USPA). He is among the top 20 batsmen in Uganda since 2010 with 289 runs in 16 innings. In 2005, he was named the youngest ever double centurion in Uganda when he defeated the visiting Dean Close College bowling arsenal from England.

== See also ==
- Roger Mukasa
- Nizakat Khan
- Riazat Ali Shah
- Joel Olwenyi
