= Khalil Rehmtullah =

Tanzanian cricketer (born 1985)

Personal information
- Born: 8 August 1985 (age 41)

International information
- National side: Tanzania
- Source: Cricinfo, 19 July 2015

Khalil Rehmtullah (born 8 August 1985) is a Tanzanian cricketer. He played in the 2014 ICC World Cricket League Division Five tournament. In July 2018, he was part of Tanzania's squad in the Eastern sub region group for the 2018–19 ICC World Twenty20 Africa Qualifier tournament.
