= Tom Kirk (cricketer) =

Guernsey cricketer (born 1992)

Personal information
- Born: 6 August 1992 (age 34)

International information
- National side: Guernsey
- Source: ESPNcricinfo, 21 May 2016

Tom Kirk (born 6 August 1992) is a professional cricketer who plays for Guernsey. He played in the 2016 ICC World Cricket League Division Five tournament. He made his T20 International debut for Guernsey against Jersey at St Martin on July 08, 2023.
