= Laurence Sematimba =

Ugandan cricketer (born 1982)

Personal information
- Born: 28 June 1982 (age 44); Kampala, Uganda
- Batting: Right-handed
- Bowling: Right-arm off break

International information
- National side: Uganda

Career statistics
Competition	First-class	List A
Matches	3	4
Runs scored	83	83
Batting average	16.60	20.75
100s/50s	0/1	0/1
Top score	57	48
Catches/stumpings	9/0	1/0
- Source: CricketArchive, 21 October 2021

Laurence Sematimba (born 28 June 1982) is a Ugandan cricketer. He is a right-handed batsman and wicketkeeper and has played 9 ICC Trophy games for Uganda.
