= Charles Waiswa =

Ugandan cricketer

Personal information
- Born: 29 December 1987 (age 38); Jinja, Uganda
- Batting: Left-handed
- Bowling: Left-arm medium-fast

International information
- National side: Uganda
- T20I debut (cap 11): 20 May 2019 v Botswana
- Last T20I: 15 September 2021 v Kenya

Career statistics
Competition	First-class	List A
Matches	2	6
Runs scored	20	6
Batting average	20.00	–
100s/50s	0/0	0/0
Top score	11	5*
Balls bowled	229	264
Wickets	8	3
Bowling average	16.37	57.33
5 wickets in innings	0	0
10 wickets in match	0	0
Best bowling	4/58	1/27
Catches/stumpings	3/0	0/0
- Source: CricketArchive, 15 September 2021

Charles Waiswa (born 29 December 1987) is a Ugandan cricketer who played in the 2005 ICC Trophy in Ireland. He spent a short period of time in the Nottinghamshire Premier Cricket league at Killamarsh Juniors Cricket Club in England.

He has joined Newark based club Newark Ransome & Marles CC for the 2011 season as their overseas player.

In April 2018, he was named in Uganda's team for the 2018 ICC World Cricket League Division Four tournament in Malaysia. In July 2018, he was part of Uganda's squad in the Eastern sub region group for the 2018–19 ICC World Twenty20 Africa Qualifier tournament.

In September 2018, he was named in Uganda's squad for the 2018 Africa T20 Cup. The following month, he was named in Uganda's squad for the 2018 ICC World Cricket League Division Three tournament in Oman. He was the joint-leading wicket-taker for Uganda in the tournament, with six dismissals in five matches.

In May 2019, he was named in Uganda's squad for the Regional Finals of the 2018–19 ICC T20 World Cup Africa Qualifier tournament in Uganda. He made his Twenty20 International (T20I) debut for Uganda against Botswana on 20 May 2019. In July 2019, he was one of twenty-five players named in the Ugandan training squad, ahead of the Cricket World Cup Challenge League fixtures in Hong Kong. In November 2019, he was named in Uganda's squad for the Cricket World Cup Challenge League B tournament in Oman.
