= Benjamin Musoke =

Ugandan cricketer (born 1976)

Personal information
- Born: 23 October 1976 (age 50); Kampala, Uganda
- Batting: Right-handed
- Bowling: Right-arm medium

Career statistics
Competition	First-class	List A
Matches	4	5
Runs scored	161	15
Batting average	20.12	3.75
100s/50s	0/1	0/0
Top score	72	9
Catches/stumpings	5/0	5/0
- Source: CricketArchive, 28 March 2019

Benjamin Musoke (born 23 October 1976) is a Ugandan cricketer. A right-handed batsman and right-arm medium pace bowler, he has played for the Uganda national cricket team since 2001. His matches include four first-class matches and five List A matches.

== Playing career ==
Mosoke's first international appearance was at the 1997 ICC Trophy when he represented East and Central Africa in five matches at the tournament in Kuala Lumpur, Malaysia. He first appeared for Uganda at the 2001 ICC Trophy. his first-class debut was in April 2004, when he played an ICC Intercontinental Cup match against Namibia, also playing against Kenya in the same tournament later in the year.

In 2005, he played two further first-class matches against Kenya and Namibia in the 2005 ICC Intercontinental Cup and made his List A debut in the 2005 ICC Trophy. He has continued playing for Uganda since, playing matches against Bermuda and Canada in January 2007, before representing them at Division Three of the World Cricket League in Darwin, Australia later in the year, a tournament which Uganda won.
