= Rockie D'Mello =

Kenyan cricket umpire (born 1961)

Personal information
- Born: 26 October 1961 (age 65); Mumbai, India
- Role: Umpire

Umpiring information
- ODIs umpired: 1 (2001)
- T20Is umpired: 30 (2007–2024)
- WT20Is umpired: 17 (2019–2025)
- Source: Cricinfo, 21 June 2023

Rockie D'Mello (born 26 October 1961) is an Indian-born Kenyan cricket umpire. As of December 2023, he had officiated in a solitary One Day International, 23 Twenty20 Internationals and 12 women's T20Is.

== See also ==
- List of One Day International cricket umpires
- List of Twenty20 International cricket umpires
