= Saheed Akolade =

Nigerian cricketer (born 1993)

- Akolade fielding for Yarraville in 2019

Personal information
- Full name: Saheed Olawale Akolade
- Born: 1 March 1993 (age 33)
- Batting: Right-handed
- Bowling: Right-arm medium
- Role: Bowler

International information
- National side: Nigeria

Domestic team information
- Years: Team
- Ibeju Lekki
- Mildenhall
- Spring Gully
- Golden Square
- Huntly-North Epsom
- Yarraville
- Source: ESPNcricinfo, 1 October 2026

Saheed Olawale Akolade (born 1 March 1993) is a Nigerian cricketer. A right-arm opening bowler, he played for the Nigeria national cricket team in the ICC World Cricket League and African regional tournaments between 2009 and 2018, including the side that won the 2013 ICC World Cricket League Division Seven. He made his international debut aged 16, and his best figures for Nigeria were 6/27 against Bahrain in 2013. He also played club cricket in Lagos, England and Victoria, Australia, where he was among the leading wicket-takers of the Emu Valley Cricket Association in the 2010s.

== Early life ==
Akolade lost both of his parents in childhood and has described cricket as central to his life from a young age.

== International career ==
Akolade made his debut for Nigeria aged 16 at the 2009 ICC World Cricket League Division Seven in Guernsey, opening the bowling and taking 2/28 from ten overs against the hosts at St Peter Port on 21 May 2009.

He was named in Nigeria's squad for the 2011 ICC World Cricket League Division Seven in Botswana. He took 1/31 against Norway and 1/25 against Japan as Nigeria reached the final.

At the 2013 Africa Twenty20 Division One in Uganda he opened the bowling and took 3/23 from four overs against Tanzania. Later that year Nigeria won the 2013 ICC World Cricket League Division Seven in Botswana, winning promotion to Division Six. Akolade took 5/34 from ten overs against Germany in a 160-run win that kept Nigeria in contention for promotion, and 2/39 from eight overs in the final, which Nigeria won by six wickets against Vanuatu.

Akolade bowling for Nigeria in Jersey, July 2013

At the 2013 ICC World Cricket League Division Six in Jersey he took 3/26 against the hosts and a career-best 6/27 against Bahrain at St Martin. He opened the bowling at the 2014 ICC World Cricket League Division Five in Malaysia, taking 3/29 against Guernsey. Later in 2014 he was named in Nigeria's squad for the ICC Africa Division Two Twenty20 tournament in Benoni, South Africa.

In March 2018 the Nigeria Cricket Federation named him as one of its Australia-based players in the 14-man squad for the ICC World Twenty20 Africa Qualifier in Lagos, joining the training camp from 12 March. He took a wicket with his third ball against Sierra Leone, and Nigeria advanced to the regional final along with Ghana.

== Club career ==
=== Nigeria ===
In Lagos, Akolade played for Ibeju Lekki Cricket Club in the Club Cricket Committee league. In the 2009-10 season he took 21 wickets at an average of 8.48 in ten matches for the club's first team, with best figures of 5/19.

=== England ===
Akolade played club cricket in England for Mildenhall and Lakenheath over three summers and had a trial with Essex County Cricket Club. In 2013 he bowled in the nets to the Australian and English squads before the Ashes Test at Lord's.

=== Australia ===
Akolade moved to Australia in 2015 and joined Spring Gully in the Emu Valley Cricket Association in Bendigo. On debut on 31 January 2015 he took 1/64 from 18 overs against United, with the Bendigo Advertiser reporting that he "let rip some thunderbolts". At Bendigo Country Week in January 2016 he took 6/63 from 16 overs for Emu Valley against Castlemaine. Later that season he was part of the Spring Gully side that played United in the 2015-16 EVCA Division 1 grand final.

He played first XI cricket for Golden Square in the Bendigo District Cricket Association in 2017-18, taking 19 wickets as the club reached the semi-finals. For 2018-19 he moved to rival BDCA club Huntly-North Epsom, whose captain said he "bowls with some wheels". He later returned to Spring Gully, where in a March 2019 match against California Gully he took 2/32 and made 33 in a ninth-wicket stand of 106 with James Fox to win the game, and made 36 from 29 balls in the 2018-19 EVCA grand final, lost to Sedgwick. In December 2019 the Bendigo Advertiser ranked him 31st among the Emu Valley Cricket Association's leading wicket-takers of the decade, with 75 wickets for Spring Gully at an average of 19.88, two five-wicket hauls and best figures of 5/16. In 2019-20 he played two first XI matches for Yarraville in the Victorian Sub-District Cricket Association.
