= Endurance Ofem =

Nigerian cricketer (born 1982)

Personal information
- Born: 16 July 1982 (age 44)

International information
- National side: Nigeria
- Source: Cricinfo, 18 July 2015

Endurance Ofem (born 16 July 1982) is a Nigerian cricketer. He played in the 2013 ICC World Cricket League Division Six tournament.
