= Kunle Adegbola =

Nigerian cricketer (born 1984)

Personal information
- Born: 11 February 1984 (age 42)

International information
- National side: Nigeria
- Source: Cricinfo, 18 July 2015

Kunle Adegbola (born 11 February 1984) is a Nigerian cricketer. He played in the 2013 ICC World Cricket League Division Six tournament. Kunle attended Ijemo-Titun High School Abeokuta in Ogun State. He played for Nigeria's under-19 team that played Ghana at the Achimota oval in December 2000. Adegbola also played at the ACA championship in Lusaka, Zambia in September 2002.
