= Oluseye Olympio =

Nigerian cricketer (born 1990)

Personal information
- Born: 30 May 1990 (age 36)

International information
- National side: Nigeria
- Source: Cricinfo, 18 July 2015

Oluseye Olympio (born 30 May 1990) is a Nigerian cricketer. He played in the 2013 ICC World Cricket League Division Six tournament.
