= Olajide Bejide =

Nigerian cricketer (born 1985)

Personal information
- Born: 17 December 1985 (age 40)

International information
- National side: Nigeria
- Source: Cricinfo, 18 July 2015

Olajide Bejide (born 17 December 1985) is a Nigerian cricketer. He played in the 2013 ICC World Cricket League Division Six tournament.
