= 2024 Cricket World Cup Challenge League B (Uganda) =

Cricket tournament

2024 Uganda Cricket World Cup Challenge League B
- Dates: 6 – 16 November 2024
- Administrator: International Cricket Council
- Cricket format: List A
- Tournament format: Round-robin
- Host: Uganda
- Participants: 6
- Matches: 15
- Most runs: (Italy) Emilio Gay (269)
- Most wickets: (Hong Kong) Yasim Murtaza (13)

The 2024 Uganda Cricket World Cup Challenge League B was the inaugural round of Group B matches of the 2024–2026 Cricket World Cup Challenge League, a cricket tournament which forms part of the qualification pathway to the 2027 Cricket World Cup. The tournament was hosted by the Uganda Cricket Association in November 2024, with all matches having List A status.

== Squads ==
| Bahrain | Hong Kong | Italy | Singapore | Tanzania | Uganda |
|---|---|---|---|---|---|
| Haider Ali (c); Sohail Ahmed; Asif Ali; Imran Anwar; Muhammad Asif; Junaid Aziz; Shahbaz Badar; Ahmer Bin Nasir (wk); Rizwan Butt; Ali Dawood; Imran Khan; Sachin Kumar; Abdul Majid Abbasi; Muhammad Salman; Umer Toor (wk); Sameer Yousuf | Nizakat Khan (c); Zeeshan Ali; Martin Coetzee; Babar Hayat; Ateeq Iqbal; Aizaz Khan; Anas Khan; Ehsan Khan; Shiv Mathur (wk); Adil Mehmood; Yasim Murtaza; Nasrulla Rana; Anshuman Rath; Ayush Shukla | Marcus Campopiano (c); Zain Ali; Gareth Berg; Joe Burns; Emilio Gay; Rakibul Hasan; Crishan Kalugamage; Haseeb Khan; Damith Kosala; Harry Manenti; Gian-Piero Meade (wk); Anthony Mosca; Jaspreet Singh; Grant Stewart | Manpreet Singh (c, wk); Aahan Gopinath Achar; Harsha Bharadwaj; Aman Desai (wk); Pranav Dhanuka; Aritra Dutta; Rezza Gaznavi; Aslan Jafri; Ramesh Kalimuthu; Amartya Kaul; Riaan Naik; Shreyan Pattnaik; Akshay Puri; Rohan Rangarajan; Pravan Sudarshan | Abhik Patwa (c); Akhil Anil; Laksh Bakrania; Harsheed Chohan; Mohamed Issa; Ally Kimote; Omary Kitunda; Khalidy Juma; Rajendra Maringanti; Kassim Nassoro; Amal Rajeevan (wk); Ivan Selemani; Mukesh Suthar; SanjayKumar Thakor | Riazat Ali Shah (c); Fred Achelam (wk); Raghav Dhawan; Cosmas Kyewuta; Shrideep Mangela; Brian Masaba; Juma Miyagi; Pascal Murungi; Dinesh Nakrani; Frank Nsubuga; Robinson Obuya; Alpesh Ramjani; Henry Ssenyondo; Kenneth Waiswa |

== Fixtures ==
6 November 2024
10:00
Scorecard

| Singapore; 82 (38.4 overs) | v | Uganda; 86/3 (17.5 overs) |
| Aritra Dutta 26 (42); Dinesh Nakrani 6/20 (9.4 overs) | | Kenneth Waiswa 26* (37); Harsha Bharadwaj 1/23 (5 overs) |

Uganda won by 7 wickets
Entebbe Cricket Oval, Entebbe
Umpires: Iknow Chabi (Zim) and Ahmed Shah Pakteen (Afg)
Player of the match: Dinesh Nakrani (Uga)

- Singapore won the toss and elected to bat.
- Shrideep Mangela, Robinson Obuya, Alpesh Ramjani (Uga), Harsha Bharadwaj, Ramesh Kalimuthu and Riaan Naik (Sin) all made their List A debuts.
- Dinesh Nakrani (Uga) took his first five-wicket haul in List A cricket.

7 November 2024
10:00
Scorecard

| Bahrain; 200/9 (46 overs) | v | Hong Kong; 201/7 (44.5 overs) |
| Asif Ali 51 (61); Yasim Murtaza 4/23 (9 overs) | | Babar Hayat 103 (125); Sachin Kumar 3/36 (8 overs) |

Hong Kong won by 3 wickets (DLS method)
Lugogo Stadium, Kampala
Umpires: Forster Mutizwa (Zim) and Ahmed Shah Pakteen (Afg)
Player of the match: Babar Hayat (HK)

- Bahrain won the toss and elected to bat.
- Hong Kong were set a revised target of 201 runs from 46 overs due to rain.
- Asif Ali, Umer Toor (Bhr), Anas Khan and Ateeq Iqbal (HK) all made their List A debuts.

7 November 2024
10:00
Scorecard

| Tanzania; 173 (43.4 overs) | v | Italy; 169/1 (28.4 overs) |
| Mukesh Suthar 50* (67); Damith Kosala 4/35 (8 overs) | | Emilio Gay 96* (84); Laksh Bakrania 1/46 (6 overs) |

Italy won by 9 wickets (DLS method)
Entebbe Cricket Oval, Entebbe
Umpires: Gazi Sohel (Ban) and Patric Makumbi (Uga)
Player of the match: Emilio Gay (Ita)

- Tanzania won the toss and elected to bat.
- Italy were set a revised target of 169 runs from 45 overs due to rain.
- Rajendra Maringanti, Amal Rajeevan and Mukesh Suthar (Tan) all made their List A debuts.

9 November 2024
10:00
Scorecard

| Uganda; 289/7 (50 overs) | v | Tanzania; 80 (27.5 overs) |
| Riazat Ali Shah 104 (87); Akhil Anil 2/53 (10 overs) | | Ivan Selemani 18 (18); Cosmas Kyewuta 5/26 (8 overs) |

Uganda won by 209 runs
Lugogo Stadium, Kampala
Umpires: Ahmed Shah Pakteen (Afg) and Gazi Sohel (Ban)
Player of the match: Riazat Ali Shah (Uga)

- Tanzania won the toss and elected to field.
- Harsheed Chohan (Tan) made his List A debut.
- Riazat Ali Shah (Uga) scored his first century in List A cricket.
- Cosmas Kyewuta (Uga) took his first five-wicket haul in List A cricket.

9 November 2024
10:00
Scorecard

| Italy; 342/4 (50 overs) | v | Hong Kong; 187 (41.4 overs) |
| Harry Manenti 114* (80); Yasim Murtaza 2/53 (10 overs) | | Anshuman Rath 90 (107); Grant Stewart 2/27 (9 overs) |

Italy won by 155 runs
Entebbe Cricket Oval, Entebbe
Umpires: Faisal Afridi (Pak) and Patric Makumbi (Uga)
Player of the match: Grant Stewart (Ita)

- Hong Kong won the toss and elected to field.

10 November 2024
10:00
Scorecard

| Uganda; 291/9 (50 overs) | v | Hong Kong; 72/3 (15.2 overs) |
| Riazat Ali Shah 80 (66); Ateeq Iqbal 3/53 (10 overs) | | Zeeshan Ali 37 (47); Henry Ssenyondo 1/1 (1 over) |

No result
Lugogo Stadium, Kampala
Umpires: Iknow Chabi (Zim) and Forster Mutizwa (Zim)

- Uganda won the toss and elected to bat.
- No further play was possible due to rain.

10 November 2024
10:00
Scorecard

| Singapore; 145 (47.4 overs) | v | Bahrain; 146/8 (41.4 overs) |
| Rohan Rangarajan 33 (53); Sachin Kumar 3/19 (5.4 overs) | | Haider Ali 51* (62); Harsha Bharadwaj 3/38 (10 overs) |

Bahrain won by 2 wickets
Entebbe Cricket Oval, Entebbe
Umpires: Faisal Afridi (Pak) and Patric Makumbi (Uga)
Player of the match: Ali Dawood (Bah)

- Bahrain won the toss and elected to field.

12 November 2024
10:00
Scorecard

| Bahrain | v | Italy |

Match abandoned
Lugogo Stadium, Kampala
Umpires: Iknow Chabi (Zim) and Forster Mutizwa (Zim)

- No toss.
- No play was possible due to rain.

12 November 2024
10:00
Scorecard

| Tanzania; 127 (24.3 overs) | v | Hong Kong; 131/5 (23.2 overs) |
| Abhik Patwa 51 (49); Ayush Shukla 3/25 (5 overs) | | Yasim Murtaza 63* (52); SanjayKumar Thakor 3/16 (5 overs) |

Hong Kong won by 5 wickets
Entebbe Cricket Oval, Entebbe
Umpires: Faisal Afridi (Pak) and Gazi Sohel (Ban)
Player of the match: Yasim Murtaza (HK)

- Hong Kong won the toss and elected to field.
- The match was reduced to 25 overs per side due to rain.
- Shiv Mathur (HK) and Khalidy Juma (Tan) both made their List A debuts.

13 November 2024
10:00
Scorecard

| Tanzania; 100/3 (14 overs) | v | Singapore |
| Ivan Selemani 59* (45); Riaan Naik 1/11 (1 over) |

No result
Lugogo Stadium, Kampala
Umpires: Patric Makumbi (Uga) and Forster Mutizwa (Zim)

- Singapore won the toss and elected to field.
- No further play was possible due to rain.
- Pravan Sudarshan (Sin) made his List A debut.

13 November 2024
10:00
Scorecard

| Uganda; 254/9 (50 overs) | v | Italy; 230 (49.3 overs) |
| Dinesh Nakrani 58 (47); Grant Stewart 3/41 (10 overs) | | Joe Burns 82 (88); Alpesh Ramjani 5/69 (9.3 overs) |

Uganda won by 24 runs
Entebbe Cricket Oval, Entebbe
Umpires: Iknow Chabi (Zim) and Ahmed Shah Pakteen (Afg)
Player of the match: Henry Ssenyondo (Uga)

- Uganda won the toss and elected to bat.
- Alpesh Ramjani (Uga) took his first five-wicket haul in List A cricket.

15 November 2024
10:00
Scorecard

| Bahrain; 237 (49.5 overs) | v | Tanzania; 153 (35.3 overs) |
| Ahmer Bin Nasir 89 (100); Harsheed Chohan 4/51 (7.5 overs) | | Mukesh Suthar 36 (59); Ali Dawood 3/34 (9 overs) |

Bahrain won by 84 runs
Lugogo Stadium, Kampala
Umpires: Forster Mutizwa (Zim) and Gazi Sohel (Ban)
Player of the match: Ahmer Bin Nasir (Bhr)

- Bahrain won the toss and elected to bat.

15 November 2024
10:00
Scorecard

| Hong Kong; 128/9 (29 overs) | v | Singapore; 89 (20 overs) |
| Nizakat Khan 40 (51); Manpreet Singh 3/25 (6 overs) | | Rohan Rangarajan 38 (38); Yasim Murtaza 4/17 (5 overs) |

Hong Kong won by 57 runs (DLS method)
Entebbe Cricket Oval, Entebbe
Umpires: Faisal Afridi (Pak) and Ahmed Shah Pakteen (Afg)
Player of the match: Yasim Murtaza (HK)

- Hong Kong won the toss and elected to bat.
- Singapore were set a revised target of 147 runs in 29 overs due to rain.

16 November 2024
10:00
Scorecard

| Singapore; 118 (27.2 overs) | v | Italy; 120/2 (15.4 overs) |
| Aritra Dutta 25 (29); Rakibul Hasan 5/38 (9.2 overs) | | Emilio Gay 66* (45); Harsha Bharadwaj 1/18 (3 overs) |

Italy won by 8 wickets
Lugogo Stadium, Kampala
Umpires: Iknow Chabi (Zim) and Patric Makumbi (Uga)
Player of the match: Rakibul Hasan (Ita)

- Singapore won the toss and elected to bat.
- Zain Ali, Haseeb Khan (Ita) and Shreyan Pattnaik (Sin) all made their List A debuts.
- Rakibul Hasan (Ita) took his first five-wicket haul in List A cricket.

16 November 2024
10:00
Scorecard

| Uganda; 267/8 (50 overs) | v | Bahrain; 101 (40.5 overs) |
| Shrideep Mangela 102* (128); Ali Dawood 2/41 (10 overs) | | Haider Ali 50* (67); Alpesh Ramjani 3/13 (9 overs) |

Uganda won by 166 runs
Entebbe Cricket Oval, Entebbe
Umpires: Faisal Afridi (Pak) and Gazi Sohel (Ban)
Player of the match: Dinesh Nakrani (Uga)

- Uganda won the toss and elected to bat.
