= Uganda at the Men's T20 World Cup =

Uganda national team performance at T20 World Cup

The Uganda national cricket team is one of the associate members of the International Cricket Council (ICC), they are nicknamed as the Cricket Cranes. Uganda qualified for their maiden T20 World Cup in 2024, after finishing as runners-up of the Africa regional qualifier. They were unable to make it past the group stage but managed to secure one victory against Papua New Guinea. In their maiden run at the tournament, they recorded the joint-lowest total at the T20 World Cup after they were bowled out for 39 against West Indies.

== T20 World Cup record ==
Men's T20 World Cup record										Qualification record (Note: WCL Division One served as the qualifier for the 2007 edition.)				
Year	Round	Position	Pld	W	L	T	NR	Ab (Note: Abandoned matches are not counted in the official records.)	Captain	Pld	W	L	T	NR
(South Africa) 2007	Not eligible									Not eligible				
(England) 2009	Not eligible									Not eligible				
(Cricket West Indies) 2010	Not eligible									Not eligible				
(Sri Lanka) 2012	Did not qualify									18	9	9	0	0
(Bangladesh) 2014	Did not qualify									16	9	6	0	1
(India) 2016	Did not qualify									5	3	2	0	0
(United Arab Emirates) (Oman) 2021	Did not qualify									11	6	4	0	1
(Australia) 2022	Did not qualify									17	14	3	0	0
(United States) (Cricket West Indies) 2024	Group stage	16/20	4	1	3	0	0	0	Brian Masaba	6	5	1	0	0
(India) (Sri Lanka) 2026	Did not qualify									5	3	2	0	0
Total	0 Titles	1/10	4	1	3	0	0	0	—N/a	78	49	27	0	2

=== Record by opponents ===
Opponent	M	W	L	T+W	T+L	NR	Ab	Win %	First played
Afghanistan	1	0	1	0	0	0	0	0.00	2024
New Zealand	1	0	1	0	0	0	0	0.00	2024
Papua New Guinea	1	1	0	0	0	0	0	100	2024
West Indies	1	0	1	0	0	0	0	0.00	2024
Total	4	1	3	0	0	0	0	25.00	-
Source: Last Updated: 15 June 2024

== Tournament results ==
=== United States & West Indies 2024 ===
Squad and kit

- Brian Masaba (c)
- Simon Ssesazi
- Roger Mukasa
- Cosmas Kyewuta
- Dinesh Nakrani
- Fred Achelam
- Kenneth Waiswa
- Alpesh Ramjani
- Frank Nsubuga
- Henry Ssenyondo
- Bilal Hassun
- Robinson Obuya
- Riazat Ali Shah (vc)
- Juma Miyagi
- Ronak Patel

2024 kit

Results

Group stage (Group C)					Super 8		Semifinal	Final	Overall Result
Opposition Result	Opposition Result	Opposition Result	Opposition Result	Rank	Opposition Result	Rank	Opposition Result	Opposition Result	Overall Result
Afghanistan; Lost by 125 runs	Papua New Guinea; Won by 3 wickets	West Indies; Lost by 134 runs	New Zealand; Lost by 9 wickets	4	Did not advance				Group stage
Source: ESPNcricinfo

Scorecards

Group stage (Group C)

3 June 2024
20:30 UTC−4 (N)
Scorecard

Afghanistan; 183/5 (20 overs)	v	Uganda; 58 (16 overs)
Rahmanullah Gurbaz 76 (45); Brian Masaba 2/21 (4 overs)		Robinson Obuya 14 (25); Fazalhaq Farooqi 5/9 (4 overs)

Afghanistan won by 125 runs
Providence Stadium, Guyana
Umpires: Kumar Dharmasena (SL) and Ahsan Raza (Pak)
Player of the match: Fazalhaq Farooqi (Afg)

- Uganda won the toss and elected to field.

5 June 2024
19:30 UTC−4 (N)
Scorecard

Papua New Guinea; 77 (19.1 overs)	v	Uganda; 78/7 (18.2 overs)
Hiri Hiri 15 (19); Frank Nsubuga 2/4 (4 overs)		Riazat Ali Shah 33 (56); Alei Nao 2/16 (4 overs)

Uganda won by 3 wickets
Providence Stadium, Guyana
Umpires: Adrian Holdstock (SA) and Rashid Riaz (Pak)
Player of the match: Riazat Ali Shah (Uga)

- Uganda won the toss and elected to field.
- This was the first World Cup match victory for Uganda across all formats.

8 June 2024
20:30 UTC−4 (N)
Scorecard

West Indies; 173/5 (20 overs)	v	Uganda; 39 (12 overs)
Johnson Charles 44 (42); Brian Masaba 2/31 (4 overs)		Juma Miyagi 13* (20); Akeal Hosein 5/11 (4 overs)

West Indies won by 134 runs
Providence Stadium, Guyana
Umpires: Kumar Dharmasena (SL) and Rashid Riaz (Pak)
Player of the match: Akeal Hosein (WI)

- West Indies won the toss and elected to bat.

14 June 2024
20:30 UTC−4 (N)
Scorecard

Uganda; 40 (18.4 overs)	v	New Zealand; 41/1 (5.2 overs)
Kenneth Waiswa 11 (18); Tim Southee 3/4 (4 overs)		Devon Conway 22* (15); Riazat Ali Shah 1/10 (1 over)

New Zealand won by 9 wickets
Brian Lara Cricket Academy, San Fernando
Umpires: Richard Illingworth (Eng) and Paul Reiffel (Aus)
Player of the match: Tim Southee (NZ)

- New Zealand won the toss and elected to field.

== Records and statistics ==
=== Team records ===
Highest innings totals

Score	Opponent	Venue	Season
78/7 (18.2 overs)	Papua New Guinea	Providence	2024
58 (16 overs)	Afghanistan	Providence	2024
40 (18.4 overs)	New Zealand	San Fernando	2024
39 (12 overs)	West Indies	Providence	2024
Last updated: 15 June 2024

=== Batting statistics ===
Most runs

Runs	Player	Mat	Inn	HS	Avg	100s	50s	Period
49	Riazat Ali Shah	4	4	33	12.25	—N/a	—N/a	2024–2024
26	Juma Miyagi	3	3	13*	13.00	—N/a	—N/a	2024–2024
21	Robinson Obuya	4	4	14	5.25	—N/a	—N/a	2024–2024
19	Kenneth Waiswa	3	3	11	9.50	—N/a	—N/a	2024–2024
13	Alpesh Ramjani	4	4	8	3.25	—N/a	—N/a	2024–2024
Last updated: 15 June 2024

=== Bowling statistics ===
Most wickets

Wickets	Player	Matches	Avg.	Econ.	BBI	4W	5W	Period
5	Brian Masaba	4	13.80	5.75	2/21	0	0	2024–2024
5	Cosmas Kyewuta	4	19.40	7.36	2/17	0	0	2024–2024
4	Alpesh Ramjani	4	16.50	6.00	2/17	0	0	2024–2024
2	Frank Nsubuga	2	16.50	4.71	2/4	1	0	2024–2024
2	Juma Miyagi	3	28.00	6.00	2/11	0	0	2024–2024
Last updated: 15 June 2024
