= List of Men's T20 World Cup five-wicket hauls =

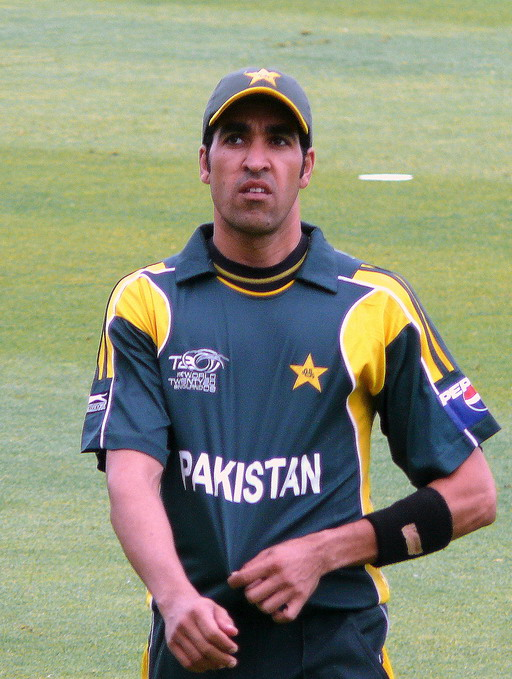
Umar Gul was the first player to take a five-wicket haul in an ICC Men's T20 World Cup match.

The ICC Men's T20 World Cup is the international championship of Twenty20 (T20) cricket. A Twenty20 International (T20I) is an international cricket match between two teams, each having T20I status, as determined by the International Cricket Council (ICC), the sport's world governing body. In a T20I, each team plays a single innings, which is restricted to a maximum of 20 overs. In cricket, a five-wicket haul (also known as a "five–for" or "fifer") refers to a bowler taking five or more wickets in a single innings. This is regarded by the critics as a notable achievement. As of the 2026 Men's T20 World Cup, the most recent to take place, there have been 14 five-wicket hauls taken by 14 cricketers.

The first five-wicket haul in an ICC Men's T20 World Cup match, as well as in any T20I match, was taken by Umar Gul of Pakistan, with bowling figures of five wickets for 6 runs. He achieved the feat on 13 June 2009 while playing against New Zealand at The Oval during the 2009 ICC World Twenty20. The second bowler to take a five-for was Sri Lanka's Ajantha Mendis, who picked up six wickets for 8 runs, recording the best bowling figures in the T20 World Cup to date. He set the record while playing against Zimbabwe, on 18 September 2012 during the 2012 ICC World Twenty20. On 27 March 2014, Ahsan Malik of the Netherlands took five wickets conceding 19 runs against South Africa during the 2014 ICC World Twenty20. With this, he became the first player from an associate nation to claim a five-wicket haul in a T20 World Cup match. Rangana Herath's five-for against New Zealand on 31 March 2014 is the most economical five-wicket haul in the T20 World Cup. He averaged 0.60 in that match, which is also the best average for a five-for in the T20 World Cup. On 26 March 2016, at the age of 20, Mustafizur Rahman picked up five wickets for 22 runs against New Zealand during the 2016 edition, becoming the youngest player to claim a five-wicket haul in the championship. Mujeeb Ur Rahman of Afghanistan was the first player to claim a five-wicket haul on his T20 World Cup debut, which he achieved while playing against Scotland on 25 October 2021, during the 2021 edition.

The 2007 and 2010 editions were the only tournaments where no five-wicket hauls were taken. Every other season except 2009 and 2022 saw two five-wicket hauls. There have been three instances when players from Sri Lanka have taken a five-for in the ICC Men's T20 World Cup, the most for any team in the competition.

== Key ==
Symbol	Meaning
†	The bowler was the man of the match
Date	Day on which the match was held
Inn	Innings in which the five-wicket haul was taken
Overs	Number of overs bowled
Runs	Number of runs conceded
Wkts	Number of wickets taken
Econ	Runs conceded per over
Batsmen	Batsmen whose wickets were taken
Result	Result for the bowler's team

== Five-wicket hauls ==
ICC Men's T20 World Cup five-wicket hauls
No.	Bowler	Date	Team	Opponent	Venue	Inn	Overs	Runs	Wkts	Econ	Batsmen	Result
1	Umar Gul †	13 June 2009	Pakistan	New Zealand	The Oval, London	1	3	6	5	2.00	Scott Styris; Peter McGlashan; Nathan McCullum; James Franklin; Kyle Mills	Won
2	Ajantha Mendis †	18 September 2012	Sri Lanka	Zimbabwe	Mahinda Rajapaksa International Cricket Stadium, Hambantota	2	4	8	6	2.00	Hamilton Masakadza; Vusi Sibanda; Brendan Taylor; Elton Chigumbura; Prosper Utseya; Kyle Jarvis	Won
3	Lasith Malinga †	1 October 2012	Sri Lanka	England	Pallekele International Cricket Stadium, Kandy	2	4	31	5	7.75	Luke Wright; Alex Hales; Jonny Bairstow; Samit Patel; Jos Buttler	Won
4	Ahsan Malik	27 March 2014	Netherlands	South Africa	Zohur Ahmed Chowdhury Stadium, Chittagong	1	4	19	5	4.75	Hashim Amla; Albie Morkel; David Miller; Dale Steyn; Beuran Hendricks	Lost
5	Rangana Herath †	31 March 2014	Sri Lanka	New Zealand	Zohur Ahmed Chowdhury Stadium, Chittagong	2	3.3	3	5	0.85	Brendon McCullum; Ross Taylor; James Neesham; Luke Ronchi; Trent Boult	Won
6	James Faulkner †	25 March 2016	Australia	Pakistan	Inderjit Singh Bindra Stadium, Mohali	2	4	27	5	6.75	Sharjeel Khan; Khalid Latif; Imad Wasim; Sarfaraz Ahmed; Wahab Riaz	Won
7	Mustafizur Rahman	26 March 2016	Bangladesh	New Zealand	Eden Gardens, Kolkata	1	4	22	5	5.50	Henry Nicholls; Kane Williamson; Grant Elliott; Mitchell Santner; Nathan McCullum	Lost
8	Mujeeb Ur Rahman †	25 October 2021	Afghanistan	Scotland	Sharjah Cricket Stadium, Sharjah	2	4	20	5	5.00	George Munsey; Kyle Coetzer; Calum MacLeod; Richie Berrington; Mark Watt	Won
9	Adam Zampa †	4 November 2021	Australia	Bangladesh	Dubai International Cricket Stadium, Dubai	1	4	19	5	4.75	Afif Hossain; Shamim Hossain; Mahedi Hasan; Mustafizur Rahman; Shoriful Islam	Won
10	Sam Curran †	22 October 2022	England	Afghanistan	Perth Stadium, Perth	1	3.4	10	5	2.72	Ibrahim Zadran; Usman Ghani; Azmatullah Omarzai; Rashid Khan; Fazalhaq Farooqi	Won
11	Fazalhaq Farooqi †	3 June 2024	Afghanistan	Uganda	Providence Stadium, Guyana	2	4	9	5	2.25	Ronak Patel; Roger Mukasa; Riazat Ali Shah; Brian Masaba; Robinson Obuya	Won
12	Akeal Hosein †	8 June 2024	West Indies	Uganda	Providence Stadium, Guyana	2	4	11	5	2.75	Roger Mukasa; Alpesh Ramjani; Kenneth Waiswa; Riazat Ali Shah; Dinesh Nakrani	Won
13	Romario Shepherd	7 February 2026	West Indies	Scotland	Eden Gardens, Kolkata	2	3	20	5	6.66	Brandon McMullen; Matthew Cross; Michael Leask; Oliver Davidson; Safyaan Sharif	Won
14	Junaid Siddique †	13 February 2026	United Arab Emirates	Canada	Arun Jaitley Cricket Stadium, New Delhi	1	4	35	5	8.75	Dilpreet Bajwa; Yuvraj Samra; Harsh Thaker; Shreyas Movva; Saad Bin Zafar	Won

== Tournament overview ==
Five-wicket hauls by tournament
Year	No. of five-wicket hauls	Best Bowling figures	Bowler
2007	0	4/7	Mark Gillespie
2009	1	5/6	Umar Gul
2010	0	4/18	Dirk Nannes
2012	2	6/8	Ajantha Mendis
2014	2	5/3	Rangana Herath
2016	2	5/22	Mustafizur Rahman
2021	2	5/19	Adam Zampa
2022	1	5/10	Sam Curran
2024	2	5/9	Fazalhaq Farooqi
2026	2	5/20	Romario Shepherd
