= 2023 Continent Cup T20 Africa =

International cricket tournament

- Tournament logo
- Dates: 9 – 21 June 2023
- Administrator: International League T20
- Cricket format: Twenty20 International
- Tournament format(s): Triple round-robin and final
- Host: Kenya
- Champions: Uganda (1st title)
- Runners-up: Kenya
- Participants: 4
- Matches: 19
- Player of the series: (Uganda) Riazat Ali Shah
- Most runs: (Kenya) Collins Obuya (284)
- Most wickets: (Uganda) Henry Ssenyondo (18) (Kenya) Vraj Patel (18)

The 2023 Continent Cup T20 Africa was a men's Twenty20 Intertnational (T20I) cricket tournament that was played in Nairobi, Kenya, in June 2023. The tournament was organised by the International League T20. The participating teams were Kenya, Botswana, Rwanda and Uganda. The tournament was to be contested as a single round-robin followed by semi-finals and a final, but this was changed to a double round-robin and a final after the withdrawal of Nigeria, and later to a triple round-robin and final after the withdrawal of Tanzania. All of the matches were played at the Gymkhana Club Ground.

Uganda and Kenya advanced from the round-robin to the final. Uganda won eight of their nine matches, while the hosts won six. The only defeat for Uganda in the round-robin was the first of their three matches against Kenya.

In the final, Uganda collapsed to 5/4 before posting 125 all out. Kenya were in a good position in their chase but ended just short of their target, meaning that Uganda won the inaugural Continent Cup T20 Africa by one run.

== Squads ==
Botswana	Kenya	Rwanda	Uganda
Karabo Motlhanka (c); Vinoo Balakrishnan; Boemo Kgosiemang; Boemo Khumalo; Dhruv Maisuria; Boteng Maphosa; Rod Mbaiwa (wk); Valentine Mbazo (wk); Mmoloki Mooketsi; Reginald Nehonde; Katlo Piet; Ameer Saiyed; Phemelo Silas; Thatayaone Tshose	Rakep Patel (c); Sachin Bhudia (wk); Emmanuel Bundi; Peter Langat; Gerard Mwendwa; Shem Ngoche; Alex Obanda; Collins Obuya; Nelson Odhiambo; Lucas Oluoch; Rushab Patel; Vishil Patel; Vraj Patel; Tanzeel Sheikh; Sukhdeep Singh (wk)	Clinton Rubagumya (c); Martin Akayezu; Zappy Bimenyimana; Eric Dusingizimana; Kevin Irakoze; Eric Kubwimana; Oscar Manishimwe (wk); Didier Ndikubwimana (wk); Wilson Niyitanga; Eric Niyomugabo; Ignace Ntirenganya; Emile Rukiriza; Orchide Tuyisenge; Bosco Tuyizere	Brian Masaba (c); Fred Achelam; Bilal Hassan; Cyrus Kakuru (wk); Roger Mukasa (wk); Pascal Murungi; Dinesh Nakrani; Frank Nsubuga; Siraje Nsubuga; Robinson Obuya; Alpesh Ramjani; Riazat Ali Shah; Henry Ssenyondo; Simon Ssesazi; Kenneth Waiswa

Vishil Patel replaced Tanzeel Sheikh in the Kenya's squad after Sheikh was injured during the opening game of tournament.

== Round-robin ==
=== Points table ===
Pos	Team	Pld	W	L	NR	Pts	NRR
1	Uganda	9	8	1	0	16	2.483
2	Kenya	9	6	3	0	12	0.970
3	Botswana	9	2	7	0	4	−1.570
4	Rwanda	9	2	7	0	4	−1.815

Source: ESPNcricinfo

Advanced to the final

=== Fixtures ===
9 June 2023
09:30
Scorecard

Rwanda; 137/9 (20 overs)	v	Kenya; 139/7 (18.3 overs)
Didier Ndikubwimana 43 (44); Lucas Oluoch 4/36 (4 overs)		Collins Obuya 36 (27); Emile Rukiriza 3/22 (4 overs)

Kenya won by 3 wickets
Gymkhana Club Ground, Nairobi
Umpires: David Odhiambo (Ken) and Nicholas Otieno (Ken)
Player of the match: Rushab Patel (Ken)

- Rwanda won the toss and elected to bat.
- Emile Rukiriza (Rwa) made his T20I debut.

9 June 2023
13:30
Scorecard

Botswana; 114 (19.5 overs)	v	Uganda; 115/4 (13 overs)
Karabo Motlhanka 45 (45); Bilal Hassan 4/23 (4 overs)		Roger Mukasa 41 (18); Mmoloki Mooketsi 2/29 (3 overs)

Uganda won by 6 wickets
Gymkhana Club Ground, Nairobi
Umpires: Charles Kariuki (Ken) and Isaac Oyieko (Ken)
Player of the match: Bilal Hassan (Uga)

- Botswana won the toss and elected to bat.

10 June 2023
09:30
Scorecard

Botswana; 169/2 (20 overs)	v	Rwanda; 136 (19.5 overs)
Karabo Motlhanka 75* (59); Martin Akayezu 1/24 (2 overs)		Didier Ndikubwimana 39 (33); Dhruv Maisuria 2/28 (4 overs)

Botswana won by 33 runs
Gymkhana Club Ground, Nairobi
Umpires: Charles Kariuki (Ken) and Isaac Oyieko (Ken)
Player of the match: Karabo Motlhanka (Bot)

- Botswana won the toss and elected to bat.

10 June 2023
13:30
Scorecard

Kenya; 185/3 (20 overs)	v	Uganda; 97 (14.1 overs)
Collins Obuya 96* (60); Frank Nsubuga 2/21 (4 overs)		Roger Mukasa 45 (25); Shem Ngoche 4/14 (4 overs)

Kenya won by 88 runs
Gymkhana Club Ground, Nairobi
Umpires: Rockie D'Mello (Ken) and David Odhiambo (Ken)
Player of the match: Collins Obuya (Ken)

- Kenya won the toss and elected to bat.

11 June 2023
09:30
Scorecard

Botswana; 92/8 (20 overs)	v	Kenya; 98/2 (10.1 overs)
Dhruv Maisuria 32* (34); Shem Ngoche 3/22 (4 overs)		Rushab Patel 45* (24); Boemo Kgosiemang 1/16 (2 overs)

Kenya won by 8 wickets
Gymkhana Club Ground, Nairobi
Umpires: Nicholas Otieno (Ken) and Isaac Oyieko (Ken)
Player of the match: Shem Ngoche (Ken)

- Botswana won the toss and elected to bat.

11 June 2023
13:30
Scorecard

Rwanda; 81 (18.1 overs)	v	Uganda; 82/2 (9.1 overs)
Kevin Irakoze 18 (15); Henry Ssenyondo 3/12 (4 overs)		Robinson Obuya 33 (19); Zappy Bimenyimana 1/9 (2 overs)

Uganda won by 8 wickets
Gymkhana Club Ground, Nairobi
Umpires: Rockie D'Mello (Ken) and David Odhiambo (Ken)
Player of the match: Henry Ssenyondo (Uga)

- Rwanda won the toss and elected to bat.
- Siraje Nsubuga and Robinson Obuya (Uga) both made their T20I debuts.

13 June 2023
09:30
Scorecard

Rwanda; 158/9 (20 overs)	v	Botswana; 131 (18.4 overs)
Clinton Rubagumya 40 (32); Dhruv Maisuria 3/24 (4 overs)		Phemelo Silas 41 (25); Zappy Bimenyimana 2/14 (4 overs)

Rwanda won by 27 runs
Gymkhana Club Ground, Nairobi
Umpires: Joseph Karuri (Ken) and David Odhiambo (Ken)
Player of the match: Clinton Rubagumya (Rwa)

- Botswana won the toss and elected to field.

13 June 2023
13:30
Scorecard

Uganda; 175/7 (20 overs)	v	Kenya; 128/7 (20 overs)
Riazat Ali Shah 43 (31); Shem Ngoche 3/42 (4 overs)		Collins Obuya 38 (27); Riazat Ali Shah 4/23 (4 overs)

Uganda won by 47 runs
Gymkhana Club Ground, Nairobi
Umpires: Charles Kariuki (Ken) and Isaac Oyieko (Ken)
Player of the match: Riazat Ali Shah (Uga)

- Uganda won the toss and elected to bat.

14 June 2023
09:30
Scorecard

Uganda; 153/7 (20 overs)	v	Botswana; 89/9 (20 overs)
Roger Mukasa 31 (20); Katlo Piet 3/33 (4 overs)		Valentine Mbazo 23 (31); Alpesh Ramjani 3/9 (3 overs)

Uganda won by 64 runs
Gymkhana Club Ground, Nairobi
Umpires: Joseph Karuri (Ken) and Isaac Oyieko (Ken)
Player of the match: Alpesh Ramjani (Uga)

- Uganda won the toss and elected to bat.

14 June 2023
13:30
Scorecard

Rwanda; 92 (18.2 overs)	v	Kenya; 98/3 (14.1 overs)
Wilson Niyitanga 35 (28); Vraj Patel 3/12 (4 overs)		Sukhdeep Singh 37* (37); Emile Rukiriza 1/14 (2 overs)

Kenya won by 7 wickets
Gymkhana Club Ground, Nairobi
Umpires: Rockie D'Mello (Ken) and Charles Kariuki (Ken)
Player of the match: Sukhdeep Singh (Ken)

- Rwanda won the toss and elected to bat.
- Vishil Patel (Ken) made his T20I debut.

15 June 2023
09:30
Scorecard

Rwanda; 85 (20 overs)	v	Uganda; 87/3 (9.3 overs)
Eric Dusingizimana 27 (20); Henry Ssenyondo 4/7 (4 overs)		Riazat Ali Shah 30* (21); Martin Akayezu 2/24 (2 overs)

Uganda won by 7 wickets
Gymkhana Club Ground, Nairobi
Umpires: Joseph Karuri (Ken) and Isaac Oyieko (Ken)
Player of the match: Henry Ssenyondo (Uga)

- Uganda won the toss and elected to field.

15 June 2023
13:30
Scorecard

Botswana; 145/8 (20 overs)	v	Kenya; 115 (18.5 overs)
Vinoo Balakrishnan 55 (38); Vishil Patel 4/27 (4 overs)		Rakep Patel 41 (26); Katlo Piet 3/25 (3.5 overs)

Botswana won by 30 runs
Gymkhana Club Ground, Nairobi
Umpires: Charles Kariuki (Ken) and David Odhiambo (Ken)
Player of the match: Vinoo Balakrishnan (Bot)

- Botswana won the toss and elected to bat.

17 June 2023
09:30
Scorecard

Botswana; 64 (18.1 overs)	v	Uganda; 65/3 (7.2 overs)
Karabo Motlhanka 22 (33); Henry Ssenyondo 4/4 (4 overs)		Simon Ssesazi 27 (18); Reginald Nehonde 2/16 (1.2 overs)

Uganda won by 7 wickets
Gymkhana Club Ground, Nairobi
Umpires: Joseph Karuri (Ken) and Isaac Oyieko (Ken)
Player of the match: Henry Ssenyondo (Uga)

- Botswana won the toss and elected to bat.

17 June 2023
13:30
Scorecard

Rwanda; 99 (20 overs)	v	Kenya; 100/3 (17.2 overs)
Didier Ndikubwimana 41 (43); Lucas Oluoch 3/18 (4 overs)		Sachin Bhudia 25* (23); Clinton Rubagumya 1/4 (2 overs)

Kenya won by 7 wickets
Gymkhana Club Ground, Nairobi
Umpires: Charles Kariuki (Ken) and David Odhiambo (Ken)
Player of the match: Lucas Oluoch (Ken)

- Rwanda won the toss and elected to bat.

18 June 2023
09:30
Scorecard

Botswana; 98/8 (20 overs)	v	Rwanda; 99/3 (18.4 overs)
Ameer Saiyed 25 (16); Emile Rukiriza 4/15 (4 overs)		Wilson Niyitanga 53 (58); Mmoloki Mooketsi 2/17 (4 overs)

Rwanda won by 7 wickets
Gymkhana Club Ground, Nairobi
Umpires: Charles Kariuki (Ken) and Joseph Karuri (Ken)
Player of the match: Emile Rukiriza (Rwa)

- Botswana won the toss and elected to bat.

18 June 2023
13:30
Scorecard

Kenya; 117/8 (20 overs)	v	Uganda; 120/5 (18.4 overs)
Nelson Odhiambo 50 (43); Henry Ssenyondo 2/29 (4 overs)		Simon Ssesazi 56* (45); Vraj Patel 2/18 (4 overs)

Uganda won by 5 wickets
Gymkhana Club Ground, Nairobi
Umpires: David Odhiambo (Ken) and Isaac Oyieko (Ken)
Player of the match: Simon Ssesazi (Uga)

- Kenya won the toss and elected to bat.

19 June 2023
09:30
Scorecard

Botswana; 131/5 (20 overs)	v	Kenya; 133/4 (17.3 overs)
Vinoo Balakrishnan 47 (42); Rakep Patel 2/16 (4 overs)		Collins Obuya 45 (21); Karabo Motlhanka 3/24 (4 overs)

Kenya won by 6 wickets
Gymkhana Club Ground, Nairobi
Umpires: Charles Kariuki (Ken) and Nicholas Otieno (Ken)
Player of the match: Collins Obuya (Ken)

- Botswana won the toss and elected to bat.

19 June 2023
13:30
Scorecard

Uganda; 153/5 (20 overs)	v	Rwanda; 59 (15.4 overs)
Riazat Ali Shah 41 (26); Ignace Ntirenganya 2/21 (4 overs)		Eric Dusingizimana 17 (21); Henry Ssenyondo 4/9 (3.4 overs)

Uganda won by 94 runs
Gymkhana Club Ground, Nairobi
Umpires: Joseph Karuri (Ken) and Isaac Oyieko (Ken)
Player of the match: Henry Ssenyondo (Uga)

- Uganda won the toss and elected to bat.

== Final ==
21 June 2023
14:00
Scorecard

Uganda; 125 (20 overs)	v	Kenya; 124/7 (20 overs)
Dinesh Nakrani 42 (31); Gerard Mwendwa 3/19 (4 overs)		Collins Obuya 44 (51); Kenneth Waiswa 2/17 (4 overs)

Uganda won by 1 run
Gymkhana Club Ground, Nairobi
Umpires: David Odhiambo (Ken) and Isaac Oyieko (Ken)
Player of the match: Dinesh Nakrani (Uga)

- Uganda won the toss and elected to bat.
