= 2024 Continent Cup T20 Africa =

International cricket tournament

- Dates: 4 – 14 December 2024
- Administrator: International League T20
- Cricket format: Twenty20 International
- Tournament format(s): Triple round-robin and final
- Host: Rwanda
- Champions: Uganda (2nd title)
- Runners-up: Nigeria
- Participants: 4
- Matches: 19
- Most runs: (Uganda) Robinson Obuya (272)
- Most wickets: (Uganda) Henry Ssenyondo (22)

The 2024 Continent Cup T20 Africa was a men's Twenty20 International (T20I) cricket tournament that was played in Kigali, Rwanda, in December 2024. This was the second edition of the tournament, and was organised by the International League T20. The participating teams were Botswana, Nigeria, Rwanda and Uganda. Uganda were the defending champions, having won the inaugural edition in June 2023.

Uganda confirmed their place in the final with two matches remaining. Nigeria secured a place in the final by defeating Rwanda on the last day of the league phase.

== Squads ==
Botswana	Nigeria	Rwanda	Uganda
Karabo Motlhanka (c); Michael Badenhorst; Vinoo Balakrishnan; Monroux Kasselman; Alfred Kgosiemang; Boemo Khumalo; Valentine Mbazo (wk); Mmoloki Mooketsi; Tumelo Mpatane; Reginald Nehonde; Tharindu Perera; Katlo Piet; Phemelo Silas; Thatayaone Tshose	Sylvester Okpe (c); Ridwan Abdulkareem; Vincent Adewoye; Peter Aho; Miracle Akhigbe; Isaac Danladi; Isaac Okpe; Olayinka Olaleye; Sulaimon Runsewe (wk); Selim Salau; Mohameed Taiwo; Ifeanyichukwu Uboh; Prosper Useni	Didier Ndikubwimana (c, wk); Martin Akayezu; Christian Benihirwe; Zappy Bimenyimana; Eric Dusingizimana; Daniel Gumyusenge; Hamza Khan; Eric Kubwimana; Oscar Manishimwe (wk); Muhammad Nadir; Isae Niyomugabo; Ignace Ntirenganya; Rukundo Pierre; Emile Rukiriza; Orchide Tuyisenge	Riazat Ali Shah (c) (Note: Fred Achelam captained Uganda in their eighth match of the series.); Fred Achelam (wk); Joseph Baguma; Raghav Dhawan; Cosmas Kyewuta; Shrideep Mangela; Juma Miyagi; Pascal Murungi; Dinesh Nakrani; Frank Nsubuga; Robinson Obuya; Alpesh Ramjani; Henry Ssenyondo; Simon Ssesazi (wk)

== Round-robin ==
=== Points table ===
Pos	Team	Pld	W	L	T	NR	Pts	NRR	Qualification
1	Uganda	9	9	0	0	0	18	3.362	Advanced to the final
2	Nigeria	9	4	5	0	0	8	−0.109	Advanced to the final
3	Rwanda	9	3	6	0	0	6	−1.566	
4	Botswana	9	2	7	0	0	4	−1.779	

Source: ESPNcricinfo

=== Fixtures ===
4 December 2024
09:15
Scorecard

Uganda; 164/8 (20 overs)	v	Botswana; 86 (20 overs)
Alpesh Ramjani 58 (35); Alfred Kgosiemang 2/22 (3 overs)		Monroux Kasselman 26 (23); Frank Nsubuga 3/8 (3 overs)

Uganda won by 78 runs
Gahanga International Cricket Stadium, Kigali
Umpires: Damascene Hagenimana (Rwa) and Gaston Niyibizi (Rwa)
Player of the match: Alpesh Ramjani (Uga)

- Botswana won the toss and elected to field.
- Tumelo Mpatane (Bot) made his T20I debut.

4 December 2024
13:15
Scorecard

Rwanda; 138 (19.3 overs)	v	Nigeria; 92/4 (11.4 overs)
Isae Niyomugabo 36 (32); Isaac Okpe 3/28 (4 overs)		Selim Salau 39 (33); Martin Akayezu 2/9 (2 overs)

Nigeria won by 6 wickets (DLS method)
Gahanga International Cricket Stadium, Kigali
Umpires: Patric Makumbi (Uga) and Isaac Oyieko (Ken)
Player of the match: Isaac Okpe (Nga)

- Rwanda won the toss and elected to bat.
- Rukundo Pierre (Rwa) made his T20I debut.
- Nigeria were set a revised target of 89 runs in 12 overs due to rain.

5 December 2024
09:15
Scorecard

Nigeria; 185/5 (20 overs)	v	Botswana; 156/7 (20 overs)
Sylvester Okpe 45* (16); Tumelo Mpatane 2/46 (4 overs)		Reginald Nehonde 60* (43); Peter Aho 3/32 (4 overs)

Nigeria won by 29 runs
Gahanga International Cricket Stadium, Kigali
Umpires: Damascene Hagenimana (Rwa) and Patric Makumbi (Uga)
Player of the match: Isaac Danladi (Nga)

- Botswana won the toss and elected to field.

5 December 2024
13:15
Scorecard

Uganda; 192/7 (18 overs)	v	Rwanda; 83 (16.1 overs)
Robinson Obuya 83 (44); Ignace Ntirenganya 1/25 (3 overs)		Oscar Manishimwe 16 (16); Dinesh Nakrani 4/16 (4 overs)

Uganda won by 112 runs (DLS method)
Gahanga International Cricket Stadium, Kigali
Umpires: Habib Enesi (Nga) and Gaston Niyibizi (Rwa)
Player of the match: Robinson Obuya (Uga)

- Rwanda won the toss and elected to field.
- Rwanda were set a revised target of 196 runs in 18 overs due to rain.
- Henry Ssenyondo became the first player for Uganda to take 100 wickets in men's T20Is.

6 December 2024
09:15
Scorecard

Botswana; 137/9 (20 overs)	v	Rwanda; 138/0 (16.2 overs)
Monroux Kasselman 51 (40); Eric Kubwimana 2/28 (4 overs)		Oscar Manishimwe 89* (52)

Rwanda won by 10 wickets
Gahanga International Cricket Stadium, Kigali
Umpires: Habib Enesi (Nga) and Isaac Oyieko (Ken)
Player of the match: Oscar Manishimwe (Rwa)

- Rwanda won the toss and elected to field.

6 December 2024
13:45
Scorecard

Nigeria; 133/9 (20 overs)	v	Uganda; 87/5 (9.4 overs)
Selim Salau 27 (18); Alpesh Ramjani 5/17 (4 overs)		Cosmas Kyewuta 24* (10); Ridwan Abdulkareem 2/24 (2 overs)

Uganda won by 5 wickets (DLS method)
Gahanga International Cricket Stadium, Kigali
Umpires: Gasana Christian (Rwa) and Damascene Hagenimana (Rwa)
Player of the match: Cosmas Kyewuta (Uga)

- Nigeria won the toss and elected to bat.
- Uganda were set a revised target of 84 runs in 11 overs due to rain.
- Alpesh Ramjani (Uga) took his first five-wicket haul in T20Is.

7 December 2024
09:15
Scorecard

Uganda; 151/8 (20 overs)	v	Rwanda; 65 (17 overs)
Riazat Ali Shah 44 (33); Ignace Ntirenganya 3/31 (4 overs)		Oscar Manishimwe 30 (33); Henry Ssenyondo 3/18 (4 overs)

Uganda won by 86 runs
Gahanga International Cricket Stadium, Kigali
Umpires: Habib Enesi (Nga) and Isaac Oyieko (Ken)
Player of the match: Riazat Ali Shah (Uga)

- Rwanda won the toss and elected to field.

7 December 2024
13:45
Scorecard

Nigeria; 141/9 (20 overs)	v	Botswana; 142/7 (19.5 overs)
Vincent Adewoye 22 (13); Mmoloki Mooketsi 2/19 (4 overs)		Phemelo Silas 42 (38); Ridwan Abdulkareem 3/20 (3 overs)

Botswana won by 3 wickets
Gahanga International Cricket Stadium, Kigali
Umpires: Patric Makumbi (Uga) and Gaston Niyibizi (Rwa)
Player of the match: Thatayaone Tshose (Bot)

- Nigeria won the toss and elected to bat.

8 December 2024
09:15
Scorecard

Nigeria; 103 (19 overs)	v	Uganda; 107/3 (13 overs)
Sulaimon Runsewe 26 (17); Henry Ssenyondo 5/8 (4 overs)		Robinson Obuya 67 (42); Isaac Okpe 1/16 (2 overs)

Uganda won by 7 wickets
Gahanga International Cricket Stadium, Kigali
Umpires: Gasana Christian (Rwa) and Damascene Hagenimana (Rwa)
Player of the match: Henry Ssenyondo (Uga)

- Uganda won the toss and elected to field.
- Henry Ssenyondo (Uga) took his first five-wicket haul in T20Is.

8 December 2024
13:45
Scorecard

Rwanda; 111/8 (20 overs)	v	Botswana; 115/4 (16.2 overs)
Didier Ndikubwimana 23 (29); Michael Badenhorst 4/21 (4 overs)		Tharindu Perera 48 (42); Zappy Bimenyimana 1/11 (3 overs)

Botswana won by 6 wickets
Gahanga International Cricket Stadium, Kigali
Umpires: Habib Enesi (Nga) and Patric Makumbi (Uga)
Player of the match: Michael Badenhorst (Bot)

- Rwanda won the toss and elected to bat.

9 December 2024
09:15
Scorecard

Uganda; 229/3 (20 overs)	v	Botswana; 121/7 (20 overs)
Simon Ssesazi 85 (53); Thatayaone Tshose 2/43 (4 overs)		Vinoo Balakrishnan 31 (16); Joseph Baguma 2/20 (4 overs)

Uganda won by 108 runs
Gahanga International Cricket Stadium, Kigali
Umpires: Habib Enesi (Nga) and Damascene Hagenimana (Rwa)
Player of the match: Simon Ssesazi (Uga)

- Botswana won the toss and elected to field.

9 December 2024
13:45
Scorecard

Nigeria; 149/8 (20 overs)	v	Rwanda; 152/4 (19 overs)
Sylvester Okpe 41 (33); Zappy Bimenyimana 2/23 (4 overs)		Isae Niyomugabo 59* (47); Mohameed Taiwo 1/13 (3 overs)

Rwanda won by 6 wickets
Gahanga International Cricket Stadium, Kigali
Umpires: Patric Makumbi (Uga) and Isaac Oyieko (Ken)
Player of the match: Isae Niyomugabo (Rwa)

- Nigeria won the toss and elected to bat.

11 December 2024
09:15
Scorecard

Rwanda; 168/8 (20 overs)	v	Botswana; 143/9 (20 overs)
Didier Ndikubwimana 62 (44); Alfred Kgosiemang 2/35 (4 overs)		Vinoo Balakrishnan 44 (35); Emile Rukiriza 4/29 (4 overs)

Rwanda won by 25 runs
Gahanga International Cricket Stadium, Kigali
Umpires: Habib Enesi (Nga) and Patric Makumbi (Uga)
Player of the match: Emile Rukiriza (Rwa)

- Botswana won the toss and elected to field.

11 December 2024
13:45
Scorecard

Uganda; 151/8 (20 overs)	v	Nigeria; 128/7 (20 overs)
Dinesh Nakrani 32 (28); Peter Aho 3/17 (4 overs)		Sylvester Okpe 41 (22); Cosmas Kyewuta 4/39 (4 overs)

Uganda won by 23 runs
Gahanga International Cricket Stadium, Kigali
Umpires: Gasana Christian (Rwa) and Gaston Niyibizi (Rwa)
Player of the match: Cosmas Kyewuta (Uga)

- Nigeria won the toss and elected to field.

12 December 2024
09:15
Scorecard

Uganda; 148/6 (20 overs)	v	Rwanda; 98/9 (20 overs)
Alpesh Ramjani 51* (35); Muhammad Nadir 3/16 (4 overs)		Zappy Bimenyimana 18* (10); Henry Ssenyondo 2/11 (4 overs)

Uganda won by 50 runs
Gahanga International Cricket Stadium, Kigali
Umpires: Habib Enesi (Nga) and Isaac Oyieko (Ken)
Player of the match: Alpesh Ramjani (Uga)

- Rwanda won the toss and elected to field.

12 December 2024
13:45
Scorecard

Botswana; 49/3 (5 overs)	v	Nigeria; 51/0 (2.5 overs)
Monroux Kasselman 20 (15); Mohameed Taiwo 1/10 (2 overs)		Sulaimon Runsewe 25* (8)

Nigeria won by 10 wickets
Gahanga International Cricket Stadium, Kigali
Umpires: Damascene Hagenimana (Rwa) and Gaston Niyibizi (Rwa)
Player of the match: Sulaimon Runsewe (Nga)

- Botswana won the toss and elected to bat.
- The match was reduced to 5 overs per side due to rain.

13 December 2024
09:15
Scorecard

Nigeria; 151/8 (20 overs)	v	Rwanda; 114/7 (20 overs)
Vincent Adewoye 34 (25); Ignace Ntirenganya 3/32 (4 overs)		Isae Niyomugabo 20 (20); Isaac Okpe 2/13 (4 overs)

Nigeria won by 37 runs
Gahanga International Cricket Stadium, Kigali
Umpires: Patric Makumbi (Uga) and Isaac Oyieko (Ken)
Player of the match: Ridwan Abdulkareem (Nga)

- Nigeria won the toss and elected to bat.

13 December 2024
13:45
Scorecard

Uganda; 141/6 (20 overs)	v	Botswana; 109/7 (20 overs)
Robinson Obuya 50 (37); Mmoloki Mooketsi 2/25 (4 overs)		Tharindu Perera 48* (36); Frank Nsubuga 3/13 (4 overs)

Uganda won by 32 runs
Gahanga International Cricket Stadium, Kigali
Umpires: Gasana Christian (Rwa) and Gaston Niyibizi (Rwa)
Player of the match: Frank Nsubuga (Uga)

- Uganda won the toss and elected to bat.

== Final ==
14 December 2024
13:15
Scorecard

Nigeria; 89 (17.3 overs)	v	Uganda; 90/4 (17.2 overs)
Isaac Danladi 32 (33); Henry Ssenyondo 3/15 (3 overs)		Riazat Ali Shah 42* (49); Mohameed Taiwo 2/11 (4 overs)

Uganda won by 6 wickets
Gahanga International Cricket Stadium, Kigali
Umpires: Gasana Christian (Rwa) and Isaac Oyieko (Ken)
Player of the match: Riazat Ali Shah (Uga)

- Nigeria won the toss and elected to bat.
