= 2022 ACA Africa T20 Cup =

The 2022 ACA Africa T20 Cup was a cricket tournament played in Benoni, Gauteng, South Africa. The finals tournament were originally scheduled to be held in September 2019, but were moved to March 2020, with the original host city being Nairobi, Kenya. On 9 March 2020, the tournament was postponed again due to the COVID-19 pandemic, in line with the Kenyan government's 30-day ban on international gatherings. The tournament was eventually rescheduled for September 2022.

The tournament finals were originally to be contested by the top two teams from each of three regional qualification events, plus South Africa and Zimbabwe as automatic qualifiers. It was later decided to make the tournament open only to associate members of the International Cricket Council, and so two additional teams from the qualifiers would be entered into the finals in place of the two full members. Ghana and Nigeria qualified from the North-Western region in April 2018, with Cameroon later granted an additional place in the finals. Botswana, Malawi and Mozambique progressed from the Southern region in November 2018. The Eastern qualifier was due to be played in Nairobi in July 2018, but did not take place; Kenya and Uganda were automatically advanced to the finals. Shortly before the finals in September 2022, Nigeria were replaced in the tournament by Tanzania.

All matches played in the tournament finals had full T20I status as the ICC granted T20I status to matches between all of its members from 1 January 2019.

Uganda defeated Tanzania in the final with Riazat Ali Shah (98*) leading a remarkable chase after the team had needed 49 runs from the last three overs.

== North-Western qualifier ==
2018 ACA Africa T20 Cup North-Western Qualifier
- Dates: 23 – 29 April 2018
- Administrator: African Cricket Association
- Cricket format: T20
- Tournament format(s): Round-robin, knock-outs
- Host: Nigeria
- Champions: Ghana
- Participants: 5
- Matches: 13
- Most runs: (Ghana) Simon Ateak (180)
- Most wickets: (Nigeria) Felix Chibuike (13)

The North-Western qualifier for the ACA Africa T20 Cup took place in Lagos, Nigeria, in April 2018, starting two days after the conclusion of the North-Western sub-regional qualifier for the 2021 ICC T20 World Cup. Cameroon took part in the ACA Africa T20 Cup qualifier, having not participated in the T20 World Cup qualifier.

=== Points table ===
Team	Pld	W	L	T	NR	Pts	NRR	Status
Ghana	4	4	0	0	0	8		Advanced to the ACA Africa T20 Cup Finals
Nigeria	4	3	1	0	0	6		Advanced to the ACA Africa T20 Cup Finals
Sierra Leone	4	2	2	0	0	4		
Gambia	4	1	3	0	0	2		
Cameroon	4	0	4	0	0	0		Advanced to the ACA Africa T20 Cup Finals

=== Fixtures ===
23 April 2018
Scorecard

Ghana; 163/5 (20 overs)	v	Gambia; 83 (18 overs)
Simon Ateak 65 (53); Ismaila Tanba 2/20 (2 overs)		Joseph Badjan 16 (25); Mark Bawa 3/16 (4 overs)

Ghana won by 80 runs
Tafawa Balewa Square Cricket Oval, Lagos
Player of the match: Simon Ateak (Gha)

- Ghana won the toss and elected to bat.

23 April 2018
Scorecard

Nigeria; 148/4 (20 overs)	v	Sierra Leone; 89 (18.1 overs)
Chimezie Onwuzulike 41 (40); Solomon Williams 2/14 (4 overs)		Lansana Lamin 20 (15); Mohameed Taiwo 3/11 (3 overs)

Nigeria won by 59 runs
Tafawa Balewa Square Cricket Oval, Lagos
Player of the match: Isaac Okpe (Nga)

- Nigeria won the toss and elected to bat.

24 April 2018
Scorecard

Gambia; 140/9 (20 overs)	v	Cameroon; 65 (16.4 overs)
Abubacarr Kuyateh 36 (28); Julien Abega 4/21 (4 overs)		Idriss Tchakou 12 (11); Abubacarr Kuyateh 4/13 (4 overs)

Gambia won by 75 runs
Tafawa Balewa Square Cricket Oval, Lagos
Player of the match: Abubacarr Kuyateh

- Cameroon won the toss and elected to field.

24 April 2018
Scorecard

Ghana; 151/4 (20 overs)	v	Nigeria; 136/7 (20 overs)
James Vifah 63 (47); Felix Chibuike 1/16 (4 overs)		Chimezie Onwuzulike 45 (43); David Ankrah 4/10 (3 overs)

Ghana won by 15 runs
Tafawa Balewa Square Cricket Oval, Lagos
Player of the match: David Ankrah (Gha)

- Nigeria won the toss and elected to field.

25 April 2018
Scorecard

Cameroon; 54 (15.2 overs)	v	Ghana; 31/0 (4 overs)
Dipita Loic 28 (17); Kofi Bagabena 4/14 (4 overs)		Kofi Bagabena 14* (17)

Ghana won by 10 wickets (DLS method)
Tafawa Balewa Square Cricket Oval, Lagos
Player of the match: Kofi Bagabena (Cmr)

- Cameroon won the toss and elected to bat.

25 April 2018
Scorecard

Sierra Leone; 102/1 (10 overs)	v	Gambia; 63/7 (10 overs)
Edward Ngegba 55* (35); Basiru Jaye 1/24 (2 overs)		Mbye Dumbuya 16 (14); Abu Kamara 2/9 (2 overs)

Sierra Leone won by 39 runs
Tafawa Balewa Square Cricket Oval, Lagos
Player of the match: Edward Ngegba (Sle)

- Sierra Leone won the toss and elected to bat.
- The match was reduced to 10 overs per side due to rain.

26 April 2018
Scorecard

Sierra Leone; 185/8 (20 overs)	v	Cameroon; 56 (14 overs)
George Ngegba 89 (61); Dipita Loic 2/23 (4 overs)		Bruno Toube 23* (23); Hari Bhamu 3/16 (4 overs)

Sierra Leone won by 129 runs
Tafawa Balewa Square Cricket Oval, Lagos
Player of the match: George Ngegba (Sle)

- Sierra Leone won the toss and elected to bat.

26 April 2018
Scorecard

Gambia; 43 (10.4 overs)	v	Nigeria; 46/0 (5.5 overs)
Muhammed Camara 12 (13); Felix Chibuike 5/11 (3 overs)		Joshua Ayannike 24* (17)

Nigeria won by 10 wickets
Tafawa Balewa Square Cricket Oval, Lagos
Player of the match: Chibuike Iteogu (Nga)

- Gambia won the toss and elected to bat.

27 April 2018
Scorecard

Cameroon; 57 (16.2 overs)	v	Nigeria; 58/0 (3.3 overs)
Roland Amah 11 (31); Sulaimon Runsewe 3/18 (4 overs)		Sulaimon Runsewe 28* (16)

Nigeria won by 10 wickets
Tafawa Balewa Square Cricket Oval, Lagos
Player of the match: Sulaimon Runsewe (Nga)

- Cameroon won the toss and elected to bat.

27 April 2018
Scorecard

Sierra Leone; 71/7 (15 overs)	v	Ghana; 72/0 (10.3 overs)
Abu Kamara 29* (41); Mark Bawa 2/4 (3 overs)		Simon Ateak 53* (44)

Ghana won by 10 wickets
Tafawa Balewa Square Cricket Oval, Lagos
Player of the match: Simon Ateak (Gha)

- Ghana won the toss and elected to field.
- The match was reduced to 15 overs per side due to rain.

=== Semi-finals ===
28 April 2018
Scorecard

Gambia; 59/9 (20 overs)	v	Ghana; 60/1 (7.1 overs)
Peter Campbell 14 (24); Isaac Aboagye 3/9 (4 overs)		Isaac Aboagye 31* (20); Mbye Dumbuya 1/25 (4 overs)

Ghana won by 9 wickets
Tafawa Balewa Square Cricket Oval, Lagos
Player of the match: Isaac Aboagye (Gha)

- Ghana won the toss and elected to field.

28 April 2018
Scorecard

Sierra Leone; 33 (7.5 overs)	v	Nigeria; 34/3 (3.5 overs)
Victor Coker 11 (8); Felix Chibuike 7/10 (4 overs)		Sulaimon Runsewe 9* (12); Mbye Dumbuya 1/25 (4 overs)

Nigeria won by 7 wickets
Tafawa Balewa Square Cricket Oval, Lagos
Player of the match: Felix Chibuike (Nga)

- Nigera won the toss and elected to field.
- Felix Chibuike (Nga) took five wickets in an over.

=== Final ===
29 April 2018
Scorecard

Nigeria; 109/9 (20 overs)	v	Ghana; 110/3 (16.2 overs)
Ademola Onikoyi 29 (30); David Ankrah 3/18 (4 overs)		Samson Awiah 33* (35); Isaac Okpe 2/20 (4 overs)

Ghana won by 7 wickets
Tafawa Balewa Square Cricket Oval, Lagos

- Ghana won the toss and elected to field.
- Both finalists advanced to the ACA Africa T20 Cup Finals.

== Southern qualifier ==
2018 ACA Africa T20 Cup Southern Qualifier
- Dates: 5 – 8 November 2018
- Administrator: African Cricket Association
- Cricket format: T20
- Tournament format: Double round-robin
- Host: Botswana
- Champions: Botswana
- Participants: 4
- Matches: 12
- Most runs: (Malawi) Moazzam Baig (226)
- Most wickets: (Botswana) Dhruv Maisuria (11) (Malawi) Mohamed Abdulla (11)

The Southern qualifier for the ACA Africa T20 Cup took place in Gaborone, Botswana, in November 2018, starting two days after the conclusion of the Southern sub-regional qualifier for the 2021 ICC T20 World Cup. Eswatini, Lesotho and Namibia all participated in the T20 World Cup qualifier, but did not take part in the ACA Africa T20 Cup qualifier.

=== Points table ===
Team	Pld	W	L	T	NR	Pts	NRR	Status
Botswana	6	6	0	0	0	12	+1.674	Advanced to the ACA Africa T20 Cup Finals
Malawi	6	3	3	0	0	6	+0.684	Advanced to the ACA Africa T20 Cup Finals
Mozambique	6	3	3	0	0	6	+0.035	Advanced to the ACA Africa T20 Cup Finals
Saint Helena	6	0	6	0	0	0	–2.337	

=== Fixtures ===
5 November 2018
Scorecard

Botswana; 152/6 (20 overs)	v	Mozambique; 125/9 (19.3 overs)
Inzimamul Master 38 (36); Kaleem Shah 3/24 (3 overs)		Filipe Cossa 68 (33); Tharindu Perera 4/33 (4 overs)

Botswana won by 27 runs
Botswana Cricket Association Oval 1, Gaborone
Player of the match: Tharindu Perera (Bot)

- Botswana won the toss and elected to bat.

5 November 2018
Scorecard

Saint Helena; 111 (20 overs)	v	Malawi; 115/3 (14.1 overs)
Weston Clingham 38 (46); Robert Kanyandula 3/9 (3 overs)		Muhammad Khurram 41* (37); Christian George 2/9 (2 overs)

Malawi won by 7 wickets
Botswana Cricket Association Oval 2, Gaborone
Player of the match: Muhammad Khurram (Mwi)

- Saint Helena won the toss and elected to bat.

5 November 2018
Scorecard

Saint Helena; 122/8 (20 overs)	v	Botswana; 128/3 (16.3 overs)
Weston Clingham 28 (34); Dhruv Maisuria 3/14 (4 overs)		Inzimamul Master 30 (35); Gareth Johnson 1/7 (4 overs)

Botswana won by 7 wickets
Botswana Cricket Association Oval 1, Gaborone
Player of the match: Dhruv Maisuria (Bot)

- Saint Helena won the toss and elected to bat.

5 November 2018
Scorecard

Malawi; 147/3 (20 overs)	v	Mozambique; 115/8 (20 overs)
Muhammad Khurram 41 (33); Kaleem Shah 2/24 (4 overs)		Kaleem Shah 47* (43); Gift Kansonkho 2/20 (3 overs)

Malawi won by 32 runs
Botswana Cricket Association Oval 2, Gaborone
Player of the match: Moazzam Baig (Mwi)

- Mozambique won the toss and elected to field.

6 November 2018
Scorecard

Malawi; 163/4 (20 overs)	v	Saint Helena; 125/8 (20 overs)
Muazzam Baig 61 (44); Christian George 2/24 (3 overs)		Ryan Belgrove 34 (27); Mohamed Abdulla 3/22 (4 overs)

Malawi won by 38 runs
Botswana Cricket Association Oval 2, Gaborone
Player of the match: Moazzam Baig (Mwi)

- Saint Helena won the toss and elected to field.

6 November 2018
Scorecard

Botswana; 134/5 (13 overs)	v	Mozambique; 69/7 (13 overs)
Reginald Nehonde 48* (31); Felipe Cossa 2/39 (3 overs)		Felipe Cossa 27 (17); Dhruv Maisuria 4/4 (3 overs)

Botswana won by 65 runs
Botswana Cricket Association Oval 1, Gaborone
Player of the match: Reginald Nehonde (Bot)

- Mozambique won the toss and elected to field.
- The match was reduced to 13 overs per side due to rain.

6 November 2018
Scorecard

Malawi; 121/8 (20 overs)	v	Botswana; 123/5 (17 overs)
Moazzam Baig 50 (38); Adithiya Rangaswamy 3/7 (4 overs)		Inzimamul Master 50* (40); Irfan Bhima 2/23 (4 overs)

Botswana won by 5 wickets
Botswana Cricket Association Oval 2, Gaborone

- Botswana won the toss and elected to field.

6 November 2018
Scorecard

Mozambique; 106/9 (20 overs)	v	Saint Helena; 66 (16.2 overs)
Felipe Cossa 58 (46); Christian George 3/16 (4 overs)		Gavin George 28 (28); Felipe Cossa 3/13 (4 overs)

Mozambique won by 40 runs
Botswana Cricket Association Oval 2, Gaborone
Player of the match: Filipe Cossa (Moz)

- Saint Helena won the toss and elected to field.

8 November 2018
Scorecard

Saint Helena; 115/6 (20 overs)	v	Botswana; 116/2 (16.4 overs)
Weston Clingham 40 (50); Dhruv Maisuria 2/32 (4 overs)		Inzimamul Master 50* (39); Andrew Yon 1/14 (2 overs)

Botswana won by 8 wickets
Botswana Cricket Association Oval 1, Gaborone
Player of the match: Inzimamul Master (Bot)

- Saint Helena won the toss and elected to bat.

8 November 2018
Scorecard

Malawi; 142/8 (20 overs)	v	Mozambique; 143/4 (19.2 overs)
Donnex Kasonkho 31 (40); Felipe Cossa 2/22 (4 overs)		Francisco Couana 69 (47); Mohamed Abdulla 2/17 (3.2 overs)

Mozambique won by 6 wickets
Botswana Cricket Association Oval 2, Gaborone
Player of the match: Francisco Couana (Moz)

- Mozambique won the toss and elected to field.

8 November 2018
Scorecard

Malawi; 172/2 (20 overs)	v	Botswana; 174/6 (19.1 overs)
Mahammed Patel 60* (25); James Moses 1/13 (4 overs)		Adithiya Rangaswamy 48 (19); Irfan Bhima 2/19 (4 overs)

Botswana won by 4 wickets
Botswana Cricket Association Oval 1, Gaborone

- Malawi won the toss and elected to bat.

8 November 2018
Scorecard

Saint Helena; 84 (20 overs)	v	Mozambique; 86/2 (7.3 overs)
Darrell Leo 22 (45); Santana Dima 3/13 (3 overs)		Imran Ismail 77* (34); Brett Isaac 1/15 (1.3 overs)

Mozambique won by 8 wickets
Botswana Cricket Association Oval 2, Gaborone

- Saint Helena won the toss and elected to bat.

== ACA Africa T20 Cup Finals ==
2022 ACA Africa T20 Cup
- Dates: 15 – 22 September 2022
- Administrator: Africa Cricket Association
- Cricket format: Twenty20 International
- Tournament format(s): Group stage, knock-outs
- Host: South Africa
- Champions: Uganda (1st title)
- Runners-up: Tanzania
- Participants: 8
- Matches: 15
- Player of the series: (Kenya) Irfan Karim
- Most runs: (Uganda) Riazat Ali Shah (222)
- Most wickets: (Botswana) Dhruv Maisuria (11)
- Official website: Africa Cricket Association

The eight qualified teams were split into two groups, with the top two teams from each group advancing to the semi-finals. The finals were played at Willowmoore Park in Benoni, Gauteng, South Africa. All matches played in the tournament finals had T20I status as the ICC granted T20I status to matches between all of its members from 1 January 2019.

=== Squads ===
Botswana	Cameroon	Ghana	Kenya
Karabo Motlhanka (c, wk); Reginald Nehonde (vc); Zain Abbasi; Shayan Ali; Vinoo Balakrishnan; Sooraj Kollery; Dhruv Maisuria; Leano Maphane; Boteng Maphosa; Inzimamul Master; Valentine Mbazo (wk); Mmoloki Mooketsi; Phemelo Silas; Thatayaone Tshose	Faustin Mpegna (c); Julien Abega (vc); Protais Abanda; Roland Amah; Abdoulaye Aminou (wk); Roger Antangana; Alexis Balla; Kulbhushan Jadhav; Dipita Loic; Appolinaire Mengoumou; Narcisse Ndouteng; Idriss Tchakou; Alain Toube (wk); Bruno Toube	Obed Harvey (c); Daniel Anefie; Kelvin Awala; Samson Awiah; Richmond Baaleri; Kofi Bagabena; Rexford Bakum; Alex Osei; Amoluk Singh; Devender Singh; Gagandeep Singh; Aziz Sualley; Joseph Theodore (wk); James Vifah	Shem Ngoche (c); Stephen Biko; Emmanuel Bundi; Irfan Karim (wk); Gerard Muthui; Nehemiah Odhiambo; Nelson Odhiambo; Lucas Oluoch; Elijah Otieno; Rakep Patel; Rushab Patel; Vraj Patel; Sukhdeep Singh; Yash Talati
Malawi	Mozambique	Tanzania	Uganda
Moazzam Baig (c); Mike Choamba; Chisomo Chete (wk); Waliyu Jackson; Daniel Jakiel; Donnex Kansonkho; Gift Kansonkho; Bernard Kapalamula; Aaftab Limdawala; Beston Masauko; Michael Mwamadi; Gershom Ntambalika; Blessings Pondani; Sami Sohail	Filipe Cossa (c); Manussur Algi; Jose Bulele; Frederico Carava; Francisco Couana; Santana Dima; Last Emilio (wk); Gomes Gomes (wk); Joao Hou; Jose Joao; Zefanias Matsinhe; Luis Mavume; Agostinho Navicha; Lourenco Salomone; Bernardo Simango; Lourenço Simango; Vieira Tembo	Abhik Patwa (c); Akhil Anil; Harsheed Chohan; Mohamed Issa; Salum Jumbe; Ally Kimote; Riziki Kiseto; Omary Kitunda (wk); Kassim Nassoro; Yalinde Nkanya; Johnson Nyambo; Amal Rajeevan (wk); Ivan Selemani; Jitin Singh	Brian Masaba (c); Deusdedit Muhumuza (vc); Fred Achelam (wk); Joseph Baguma; Cosmas Kyewuta; Juma Miyagi; Ismail Munir; Pascal Murungi; Frank Nsubuga; Alpesh Ramjani; Riazat Ali Shah; Henry Ssenyondo; Simon Ssesazi; Kenneth Waiswa

The Kenyan squad was missing the injured Eugene Ochieng, as well as the rested Sachin Bhudia, Alex Obanda and Collins Obuya. The Ugandan squad was also missing several senior players, with Joseph Baguma, Munir Ismail and Pascal Murungi being promoted from the under-19 team.

=== Group stage ===
==== Group A ====
Pos	Team	Pld	W	L	NR	Pts	NRR
1	Uganda	3	3	0	0	6	1.214
2	Botswana	3	2	1	0	4	1.490
3	Ghana	3	1	2	0	2	−0.024
4	Mozambique	3	0	3	0	0	−2.633

Source: ESPNcricinfo

Advanced to the semi-finals

15 September 2022
09:30
Scorecard

Botswana; 103/8 (20 overs)	v	Uganda; 107/3 (18.2 overs)
Sooraj Kollery 29 (41); Alpesh Ramjani 4/17 (4 overs)		Simon Ssesazi 37 (39); Reginald Nehonde 2/22 (4 overs)

Uganda won by 7 wickets
Willowmoore Park, Benoni
Umpires: Acacio Chitsondzo (Moz) and David Odhiambo (Ken)
Player of the match: Alpesh Ramjani (Uga)

- Uganda won the toss and elected to field.
- Sooraj Kollery, Boteng Maphosa (Bot), Pascal Murungi and Alpesh Ramjani (Uga) all made their T20I debuts.

16 September 2022
09:30
Scorecard

Ghana; 154/7 (20 overs)	v	Mozambique; 126/4 (20 overs)
Rexford Bakum 71 (30); Joao Hou 2/16 (3 overs)		Jose Bulele 43 (47); Obed Harvey 2/28 (4 overs)

Ghana won by 28 runs
Willowmoore Park, Benoni
Umpires: David Odhiambo (Ken) and Isaac Oyieko (Ken)
Player of the match: Rexford Bakum (Gha)

- Ghana won the toss and elected to bat.
- Kelvin Awala and Gagandeep Singh (Gha) both made their T20I debuts.

18 September 2022
09:30
Scorecard

Botswana; 146/9 (20 overs)	v	Ghana; 135 (20 overs)
Inzimamul Master 40 (34); Rexford Bakum 2/17 (3 overs)		Samson Awiah 36 (41); Dhruv Maisuria 5/18 (4 overs)

Botswana won by 11 runs
Willowmoore Park, Benoni
Umpires: Acacio Chitsondzo (Moz) and Isaac Oyieko (Ken)
Player of the match: Dhruv Maisuria (Bot)

- Ghana won the toss and elected to field.
- Leano Maphane (Bot) made his T20I debut.
- Dhruv Maisuria became the first bowler for Botswana to take a five-wicket haul in T20Is.

18 September 2022
14:00
Scorecard

Uganda; 162/7 (20 overs)	v	Mozambique; 124/9 (20 overs)
Alpesh Ramjani 78 (45); Lourenço Simango 2/20 (4 overs)		Francisco Couana 53 (37); Kenneth Waiswa 4/14 (4 overs)

Uganda won by 38 runs
Willowmoore Park, Benoni
Umpires: David Odhiambo (Ken) and Isaac Oyieko (Ken)
Player of the match: Alpesh Ramjani (Uga)

- Uganda won the toss and elected to bat.
- Joseph Baguma and Ismail Munir (Uga) both made their T20I debuts.

19 September 2022
14:00
Scorecard

Botswana; 185/6 (20 overs)	v	Mozambique; 93 (20 overs)
Karabo Motlhanka 56 (42); Filipe Cossa 2/34 (4 overs)		Francisco Couana 33 (38); Dhruv Maisuria 4/19 (4 overs)

Botswana won by 92 runs
Willowmoore Park, Benoni
Umpires: Machiel Moller (SA) and David Odhiambo (Ken)
Player of the match: Thatayaone Tshose (Bot)

- Mozambique won the toss and elected to field.

20 September 2022
14:00
Scorecard

Ghana; 133/9 (20 overs)	v	Uganda; 135/2 (17.4 overs)
James Vifah 45 (37); Kenneth Waiswa 3/28 (4 overs)		Simon Ssesazi 56* (56); Aziz Sualley 2/25 (3 overs)

Uganda won by 8 wickets
Willowmoore Park, Benoni
Umpires: David Odhiambo (Ken) and Isaac Oyieko (Ken)
Player of the match: Kenneth Waiswa (Uga)

- Ghana won the toss and elected to bat.

==== Group B ====
Pos	Team	Pld	W	L	NR	Pts	NRR
1	Tanzania	3	3	0	0	6	2.724
2	Kenya	3	2	1	0	4	3.090
3	Malawi	3	1	2	0	2	−0.915
4	Cameroon	3	0	3	0	0	−5.075

Source: ESPNcricinfo

Advanced to the semi-finals

15 September 2022
14:00
Scorecard

Cameroon; 76 (20 overs)	v	Malawi; 77/3 (13.1 overs)
Bruno Toube 16 (35); Mike Choamba 3/10 (4 overs)		Sami Sohail 28* (37); Bruno Toube 1/21 (4 overs)

Malawi won by 7 wickets
Willowmoore Park, Benoni
Umpires: John Mayeku (Uga) and Isaac Oyieko (Ken)
Player of the match: Sami Sohail (Mwi)

- Malawi won the toss and elected to field.
- Abdoulaye Aminou, Kulbhushan Jadhav (Cmr) and Aaftab Limdawala (Mwi) all made their T20I debuts.
- Daniel Jakiel also made his T20I debut for Malawi after previously playing two T20Is for Zimbabwe, becoming the fifteenth cricketer to represent two international teams in T20Is.

16 September 2022
14:00
Scorecard

Kenya; 161/7 (20 overs)	v	Malawi; 109/7 (20 overs)
Rakep Patel 47 (27); Moazzam Baig 2/36 (4 overs)		Donnex Kansonkho 40 (43); Yash Talati 3/18 (4 overs)

Kenya won by 52 runs
Willowmoore Park, Benoni
Umpires: John Mayeku (Uga) and Machiel Moller (SA)
Player of the match: Yash Talati (Ken)

- Kenya won the toss and elected to bat.
- Gerard Muthui and Yash Talati (Ken) both made their T20I debuts.

17 September 2022
09:30
Scorecard

Cameroon; 77 (18.2 overs)	v	Tanzania; 78/0 (7.5 overs)
Roland Amah 18 (23); Kassim Nassoro 4/14 (4 overs)		Abhik Patwa 42* (26)

Tanzania won by 10 wickets
Willowmoore Park, Benoni
Umpires: Acacio Chitsondzo (Moz) and Isaac Oyieko (Ken)
Player of the match: Kassim Nassoro (Tan)

- Cameroon won the toss and elected to bat.
- Akhil Anil, Yalinde Nkanya and Amal Rajeevan (Tan) all made their T20I debuts.

17 September 2022
14:00
Scorecard

Kenya; 155/3 (20 overs)	v	Tanzania; 159/6 (19 overs)
Rushab Patel 45 (44); Kassim Nassoro 1/30 (4 overs)		Akhil Anil 52* (27); Lucas Oluoch 3/21 (3 overs)

Tanzania won by 4 wickets
Willowmoore Park, Benoni
Umpires: John Mayeku (Uga) and Machiel Moller (SA)
Player of the match: Akhil Anil (Tan)

- Kenya won the toss and elected to bat.
- Stephen Biko (Ken) made his T20I debut.

19 September 2022
09:30
Scorecard

Cameroon; 48 (14.2 overs)	v	Kenya; 50/1 (3.2 overs)
Bruno Toube 14 (17); Yash Talati 3/8 (4 overs)		Sukhdeep Singh 26* (10); Julien Abega 1/11 (1 over)

Kenya won by 9 wickets
Willowmoore Park, Benoni
Umpires: Acacio Chitsondzo (Moz) and John Mayeku (Uga)
Player of the match: Yash Talati (Ken)

- Kenya won the toss and elected to field.

20 September 2022
09:30
Scorecard

Tanzania; 170/8 (20 overs)	v	Malawi; 126/4 (20 overs)
Amal Rajeevan 70 (51); Moazzam Baig 3/31 (4 overs)		Moazzam Baig 74 (58); Harsheed Chohan 1/10 (3 overs)

Tanzania won by 44 runs
Willowmoore Park, Benoni
Umpires: Acacio Chitsondzo (Moz) and John Mayeku (Uga)
Player of the match: Kassim Nassoro (Tan)

- Malawi won the toss and elected to field.
- Mohamed Issa (Tan) made his T20I debut.

=== Semi-finals ===
21 September 2022
09:30
Scorecard

Kenya; 105/8 (18 overs)	v	Uganda; 107/7 (17.3 overs)
Irfan Karim 48 (43); Cosmas Kyewuta 4/22 (4 overs)		Riazat Ali Shah 48 (43); Lucas Oluoch 4/30 (3 overs)

Uganda won by 3 wickets (DLS method)
Willowmoore Park, Benoni
Umpires: John Mayeku (Uga) and Machiel Moller (SA)
Player of the match: Cosmas Kyewuta (Uga)

- Uganda won the toss and elected to field.
- Uganda were set a revised target of 107 runs in 18 overs due to rain.

21 September 2022
14:00
Scorecard

Botswana; 146/7 (20 overs)	v	Tanzania; 149/6 (18.3 overs)
Reginald Nehonde 45 (43); Kassim Nassoro 2/24 (4 overs)		Salum Jumbe 28 (18); Dhruv Maisuria 2/13 (4 overs)

Tanzania won by 4 wickets
Willowmoore Park, Benoni
Umpires: David Odhiambo (Ken) and Isaac Oyieko (Ken)
Player of the match: Reginald Nehonde (Bot)

- Tanzania won the toss and elected to field.

=== Final ===
22 September 2022
15:00
Scorecard

Tanzania; 174/5 (20 overs)	v	Uganda; 175/2 (19.4 overs)
Abhik Patwa 68 (55); Deusdedit Muhumuza 2/14 (2 overs)		Riazat Ali Shah 98* (53); Harsheed Chohan 1/21 (4 overs)

Uganda won by 8 wickets
Willowmoore Park, Benoni
Umpires: David Odhiambo (Ken) and Isaac Oyieko (Ken)
Player of the match: Riazat Ali Shah (Uga)

- Uganda won the toss and elected to field.
