= Dhruv Maisuria =

Botswana cricketer (born 1998)

Personal information
- Full name: Dhruvkumar Maisuria
- Born: 6 August 1998 (age 28); India
- Batting: Right-handed
- Bowling: Right-arm legbreak, googly

International information
- National side: Botswana
- T20I debut (cap 12): 21 May 2019 v Nigeria
- Last T20I: 4 October 2025 v Malawi

Career statistics
Competition	T20I	T20
Matches	42	42
Runs scored	90	90
Batting average	6.00	6.00
100s/50s	0/0	0/0
Top score	32*	32*
Balls bowled	852	852
Wickets	74	74
Bowling average	10.90	10.90
5 wickets in innings	2	2
10 wickets in match	0	0
Best bowling	5/18	5/18
Catches/stumpings	15/–	15/–
- Source: Cricinfo, 14 October 2025

Dhruv Maisuria (born 6 August 1998) is an Indian-born Botswana cricketer. He has played for the Botswana national cricket team since 2015 as a right-arm leg spin bowler.

In February 2015, Maisuria was named in Botswana's squad for the 2015 ICC Africa Under-19 Championship Division One, part of the qualification process for the 2016 Under-19 Cricket World Cup. He was subsequently named in Botswana's senior squad for the 2015 ICC World Cricket League Division Six tournament in England, playing in one match.

In May 2019, he was named in Botswana's squad for the Regional Finals of the 2018–19 ICC T20 World Cup Africa Qualifier tournament in Uganda. He made his Twenty20 International (T20I) debut for Botswana against Nigeria on 21 May 2019. In October 2021, he was named in Botswana's squad for their matches in Group B of the 2021 ICC Men's T20 World Cup Africa Qualifier tournament in Rwanda.

Maisuria was voted bowler of the tournament at the 2022 ACA Africa T20 Cup. In May 2023, in the 2023 Southern Africa Cup, he surpassed Sri Lankan bowler Ajantha Mendis's record of taking 50 wickets in the fewest Twenty20 Internationals, reaching the mark in his 22nd match.
