= Salaudin Khan =

Ugandan cricketer

Personal information
- Full name: Salaudin Khan
- Born: 13 December 1933 (age 92); Uganda Protectorate
- Batting: Unknown
- Bowling: Unknown

Career statistics
Competition	First-class
Matches	1
Runs scored	54
Batting average	27.00
100s/50s	–/–
Top score	39
Catches/stumpings	3/–
- Source: CricketArchive, 31 January 2022

Salaudin Khan (born 13 December 1933) is a Ugandan former first-class cricketer.

Khan was born in Uganda Protectorate in December 1933. A figure in Ugandan cricket since the 1950s, Khan made a single appearance in first-class cricket for the East Africa cricket team against the touring Indians at Kampala in 1967. Batting twice in the match, he was run out for 15 runs in the East African first innings, while in their second innings he was dismissed for 39 runs by B. S. Chandrasekhar.

== See also ==
- Juma Miyagi
