= Uganda national cricket team =

Uganda
- Nickname: Cricket Cranes
- Association: Uganda Cricket Association

Personnel
- Captain: Riazat Ali Shah
- Coach: Steve Tikolo

International Cricket Council
- ICC status: Associate member (1998; 28 years ago)
- ICC region: Africa
ICC Rankings	Current	Best-ever
T20I	21st	21st (5 June 2024)

T20 Internationals
- First T20I: v. Botswana at Lugogo Stadium, Kampala; 20 May 2019
- Last T20I: v. Nigeria at Nigeria Cricket Federation Oval 1, Abuja; 25 October 2026
T20Is	Played	Won/Lost
Total	132	101/28 (0 ties, 3 no results)
This year	14	11/3 (0 ties, 0 no results)
- T20 World Cup appearances: 1 (first in 2024)
- Best result: Group stage (2024)
- T20 World Cup Qualifier appearances: 5 (Note: For the 2024 and 2026 Men's T20 World Cups, the final round of qualification in Africa was the ICC Africa Regional Final.) (first in 2012)
- Best result: Runners-up (2023)
List A & T20I kit
- As of 25 October 2026

The Uganda national cricket team, nicknamed the Cricket Cranes, represents Uganda in men's international cricket. The team is organised by Cricket Uganda, which has been an associate member of the International Cricket Council (ICC) since 1998.

Uganda first fielded an international team as early as 1914, against the East Africa Protectorate, but only began competing regularly in the early 1950s, playing frequent series against regional rivals Kenya and Tanzania (then Tanganyika). From 1966, Uganda contributed players to a combined East African team, which was reconstituted as East and Central Africa in 1989.

The country's first ICC tournament played in its own right was the 2001 ICC Trophy in Canada. Uganda played in the next three editions of the tournament, renamed the ICC World Cup Qualifier, but did not come close to qualifying for the Cricket World Cup. In the World Cricket League (WCL), Uganda reached ICC World Cricket League Division Two on three occasions, but was relegated to Division Three each time.

The team participated in six editions of the ICC World Twenty20 Qualifier. They qualified for the 2024 ICC Men's T20 World Cup, making it their first time in the ICC T20 WC after they finished 2nd in 2023 Africa Qualifier.

== History ==
=== East Africa team ===
Uganda combined with their regional rivals Kenya and Tanzania to form the East Africa team. The first known match for this team was against a South African "Non-Europeans" team captained by Basil D'Oliveira in September 1958 in Nairobi, with the visitors winning by seven wickets. East Africa became an associate member of the ICC in 1966.

East Africa toured England in 1972 and the Marylebone Cricket Club played a first-class match against East Africa in January 1974, winning by 237 runs. The following year, East Africa played in the 1975 Cricket World Cup in England. After various warm-up games, including a 3 wicket win against Glamorgan, they played New Zealand, India and England in the World Cup itself, losing all three matches. The World Cup was followed by a first-class match against Sri Lanka at the County Ground, Taunton, which the Sri Lankans won by 115 runs. East Africa played in the ICC Trophies of 1979, 1982 and 1986, without qualifying for the World Cup from any of them.

Uganda continued playing their regular matches against Kenya and Tanzania, despite Kenya leaving the East Africa combination in and the triangular tournament became a quadrangular tournament in 1966 when Zambia joined in. From then until the tournament's end in 1980, Uganda won the tournament just once.

=== East and Central Africa cricket team ===
The East Africa team left the ICC in 1989 and was replaced by the East and Central Africa team the same year. This new team was a combination of Malawi, Tanzania, Uganda and Zambia, and they took part in the ICC Trophy for the first time in 1990, also taking part in the 1994, 1997 and 2001 editions.

=== Independent National Team ===
Uganda left the East and Central Africa combination and became an associate member of the ICC in their own right in 1998. Their first international tournament was the 2001 ICC Trophy. After winning all five of their first round games, they lost a play-off match against the United Arab Emirates (UAE) for the right to enter the second stage of the tournament. The following year, they finished third in their group in the Africa Cup.

In 2004, Uganda played their first first-class matches in the ICC Intercontinental Cup against Kenya and Namibia, winning against Namibia. In August that year, they finished second to Namibia in the Africa Cricket Association Championships in Zambia. This qualified them for the following year's ICC Trophy, in which they finished in the twelfth and last place after losing to Papua New Guinea in their final play-off match. Earlier in the year, they again played against Namibia and Kenya in the 2005 ICC Intercontinental Cup, losing both games.

=== 2007-2018 ===
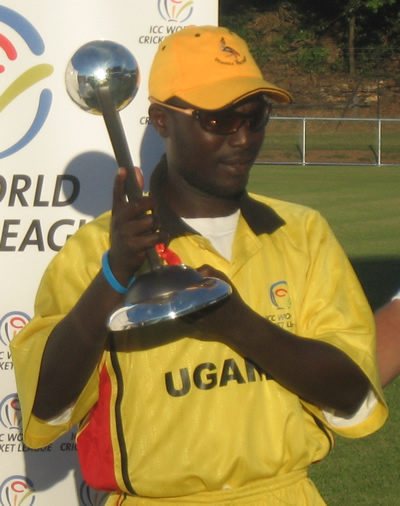
Joel Olwenyi captained the national cricket team of Uganda

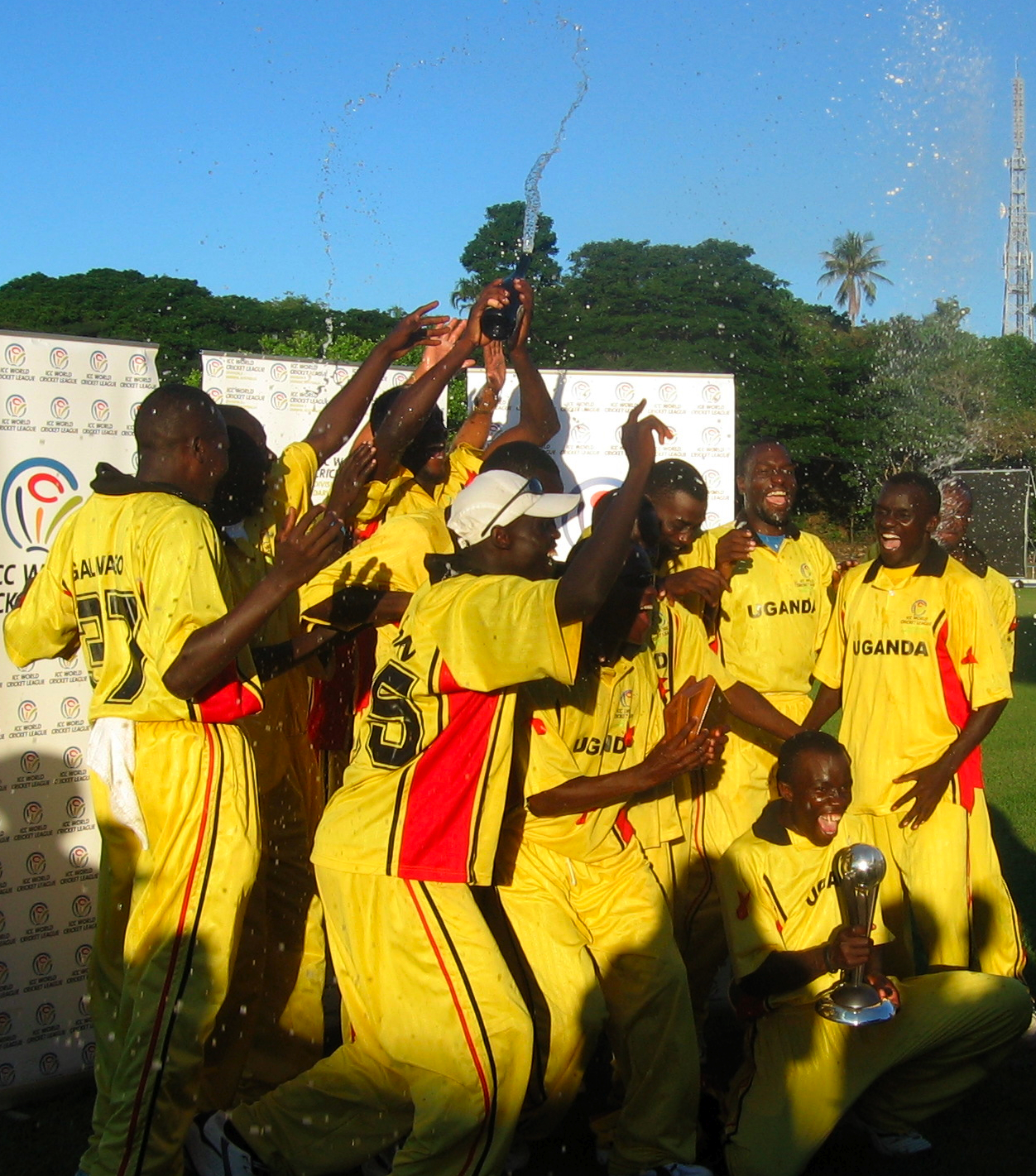
Uganda celebrate winning Division Three of the World Cricket League in 2007

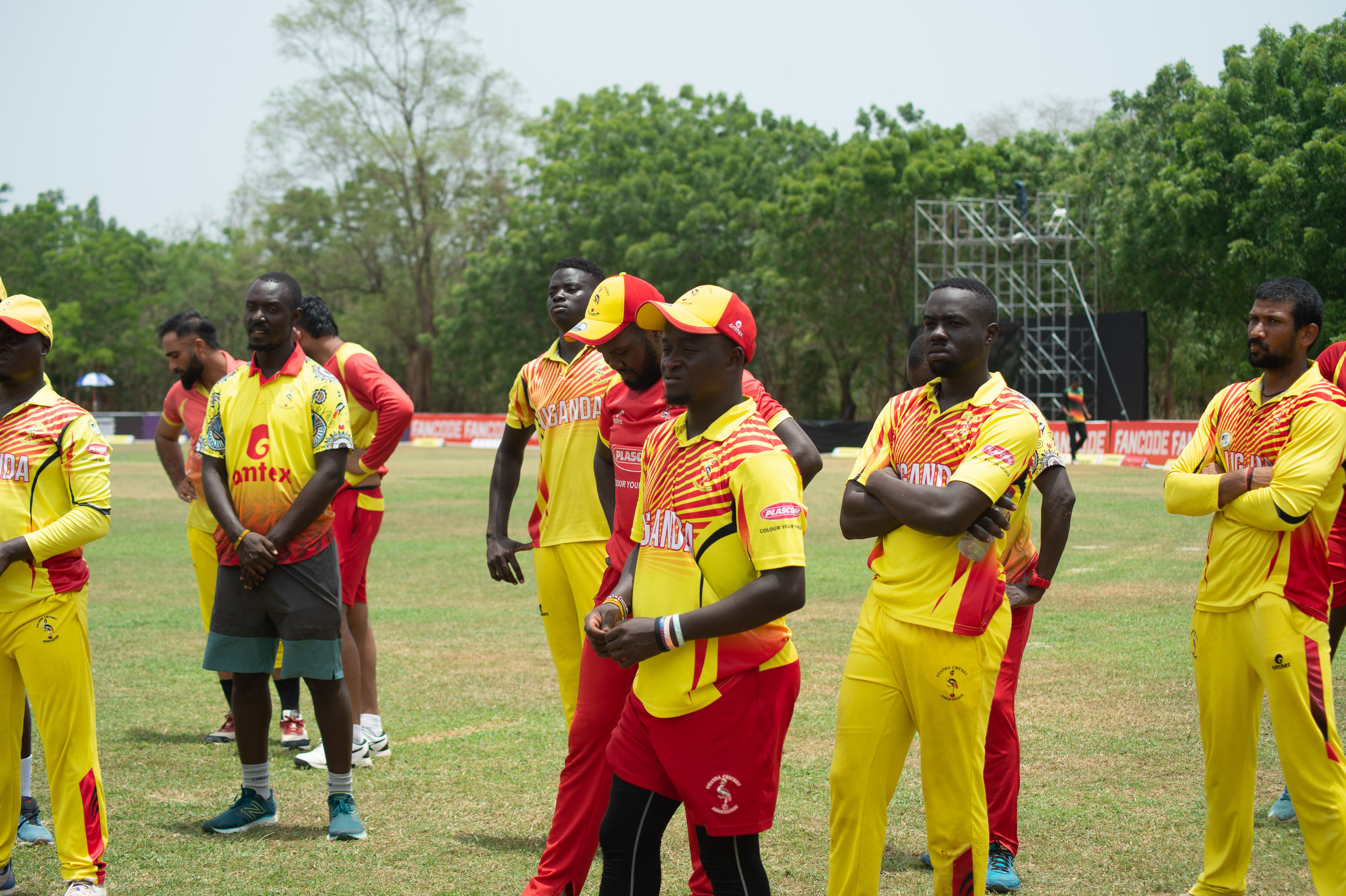
The national cricket team of Uganda in 2023

In January 2007, Uganda faced Bermuda and Canada as those two teams prepared for Division One of the World Cricket League in Nairobi. This also served as preparation for Uganda's visit to Darwin, Australia, for Division Three of the same tournament. Uganda won their Group B games against the Cayman Islands, Hong Kong, and Tanzania before beating Papua New Guinea in the semi-final and Argentina in the tournament final. Winning Division Three earned Uganda a spot in the ICC's High Performance Program, and promotion to Division Two.

Uganda took part in a four-team Twenty20 tournament before the 2007 Twenty20 World Cup, playing games against Pakistan, Kenya, and Bangladesh in Nairobi. As expected, they lost against Pakistan and Bangladesh before upsetting their African rivals Kenya with a two-wicket win.

Their next matches were two one-day games against Bermuda, also in Nairobi, in October 2007. They surprised their more experienced rivals, and although they lost the first game by just seven runs after Nandikishore Patel scored a half-century, they won the second match by 43 runs with Joel Olwenyi scoring a half-century of his own.

In November 2007, Uganda travelled to Windhoek, Namibia to participate in the WCL Division Two tournament. Uganda lost their group matches against; Denmark, Namibia, Oman, and the UAE but did defeat Argentina in their group match and also their positional playoff to finish fifth. Uganda's bottom two finish saw them relegated to Division Three.

In January 2009, Uganda won four of their five group matches and edged Papua New Guinea on run rate, to finish second in the ICC Division 3 competition in Buenos Aires, Argentina and earn the final place at the 2009 ICC World Cup Qualifier.

In April 2009, Uganda travelled to South Africa for the 2009 ICC World Cup Qualifier. Despite a first up win against Namibia, Uganda lost their remaining four Group A matches and failed to make the Super Eight stage, thus ending their chance to qualify for the 2011 Cricket World Cup. Uganda finished 10th overall after defeating Denmark but losing to Bermuda in position playoff matches, and thus was relegated to 2013 ICC World Cricket League Division Three.

In August 2018, Uganda replaced Ghana in the 2018 Africa T20 Cup, after Ghana had declined Cricket South Africa's invite to compete in the tournament. Uganda played in the 2019 T20 World Cup Qualifier Africa but got to the fourth position of the table.

=== 2018–present ===
In April 2018, the ICC decided to grant full Twenty20 International (T20I) status to all its members. Therefore, all Twenty20 cricket matches played between Uganda and other ICC members since 1 January 2019 have been full T20I matches.

20 May 2019
13:50
Scorecard

Uganda; 142/7 (20 overs)	v	Botswana; 90 (18 overs)
Arnold Otwani 44 (27); Karabo Modise 3/18 (3 overs)		Vinoo Balakrishnan 26 (32); Frank Nsubuga 2/19 (4 overs)

Uganda won by 52 runs
Lugogo Stadium, Kampala
Umpires: Emmanuel Byiringiro (Rwa) and David Odhiambo (Ken)
Player of the match: Arnold Otwani (Uga)

- Botswana won the toss and elected to field.
- First ever T20I match for Uganda.

After April 2019, Uganda played in the 2019–21 ICC Cricket World Cup Challenge League.

In 2021 and 2023, Uganda toured Namibia.

On 26 November 2023, Uganda registered their first win against an ICC Full Member by defeating Zimbabwe in the T20 World Cup Africa Qualifier.

26 November 2023
09:30
Scorecard

Zimbabwe; 136/7 (20 overs)	v	Uganda; 138/5 (19.1 overs)
Sikandar Raza 48 (39); Dinesh Nakrani 3/14 (4 overs)		Riazat Ali Shah 42 (28); Richard Ngarava 2/24 (4 overs)

Uganda won by 5 wickets
United Ground, Windhoek
Umpires: Lauren Agenbag (SA) and Stephen Harris (SA)
Player of the match: Riazat Ali Shah (Uga)

- Uganda won the toss and elected to field.
- This was Uganda's first win against a Full member side.

== Governing body ==
The Uganda Cricket Association (UCA) is responsible for all matches played in Uganda and by the Uganda cricket team. It was admitted to the International Cricket Council in 1998 as an associate member. Its current headquarters are in Kampala, Uganda.

== International Grounds ==
Stadium	City	Test matches	ODI matches	T20I matches
Lugogo Stadium	Kampala	0	0	5
Kyambogo Cricket Oval	Kampala	0	0	5
Entebbe Cricket Oval	Entebbe	0	0	10
Jinja Cricket Ground	Jinja	0	0	2

Locations of all stadiums which have hosted an international cricket match within Uganda

== Tournament history ==
Legend

- Champions
- Runners-up
- Third place/Semi-finals
- Hosts
- Q Qualified/Advanced to next stage
- DNQ Did not qualify
- ▲ Promoted
- Remained in the same division
- ▼ Relegated

=== Cricket World Cup ===
Cricket World Cup record								Qualification record				
Year	Round	Position	Pld	W	L	T	NR	Pld	W	L	T	NR
(England) 1975	Part of East Africa							Part of East Africa				
(England) 1979	Part of East Africa							Part of East Africa				
(England) (Wales) 1983	Part of East Africa							Part of East Africa				
(India) (Pakistan) 1987	Part of East Africa							Part of East Africa				
(Australia) (New Zealand) 1992	Part of East and Central Africa							Part of East and Central Africa				
(India) (Pakistan) (Sri Lanka) 1996	Part of East and Central Africa							Part of East and Central Africa				
(England) (Wales) (Scotland) (Republic of Ireland) (Netherlands) 1999	Part of East and Central Africa							Part of East and Central Africa				
(South Africa) (Zimbabwe) (Kenya) 2003	Did not qualify							6	5	1	0	0
(Cricket West Indies) 2007	Did not qualify							12	5	6	0	1
(India) (Sri Lanka) (Bangladesh) 2011	Did not qualify							23	13	10	0	0
(Australia) (New Zealand) 2015	Did not qualify							18	6	12	0	0
(England) (Wales) 2019	Did not qualify							18	8	9	0	1
(India) 2023	Did not qualify							15	11	4	0	0
(South Africa) (Zimbabwe) (Namibia) 2027	To be determined							15*	10	3	0	2
Total	—N/a	0/13	–	–	–	–	–	107	58	45	0	4

=== Cricket World Cup Qualifier ===
Cricket World Cup Qualifier records
Year	Round	Position	Pld	W	L	T	NR	Qual.
(England) 1979	Part of East Africa							
(England) 1982	Part of East Africa							
(England) 1986	Part of East Africa							
(Netherlands) 1990	Part of East and Central African							
(Kenya) 1994	Part of East and Central African							
(Malaysia) 1997	Part of East and Central African							
(Canada) 2001	Play-offs	9/24	6	5	1	0	0	DNQ
(Ireland) 2005	Play-offs	12/12	7	1	5	0	1	DNQ
(South Africa) 2009	Play-offs	10/12	7	2	5	0	0	DNQ
(New Zealand) 2014	Play-offs	10/10	6	0	6	0	0	DNQ
(Zimbabwe) 2018	Did not qualify							
(Zimbabwe) 2023	Did not qualify							
(To be determined) 2027	To be determined							
Total	0 Titles	4/12	26	8	17	0	1	—N/a

=== Men's T20 World Cup ===
Men's T20 World Cup record								Qualification record				
Year	Round	Position	Pld	W	L	T	NR	Pld	W	L	T	NR
(South Africa) 2007	Not eligible							Not eligible				
(England) 2009	Not eligible							Not eligible				
(Cricket West Indies) 2010	Not eligible							Not eligible				
(Sri Lanka) 2012	Did not qualify							18	9	9	0	0
(Bangladesh) 2014	Did not qualify							16	9	6	0	1
(India) 2016	Did not qualify							5	3	2	0	0
(United Arab Emirates) (Oman) 2021	Did not qualify							11	6	4	0	1
(Australia) 2022	Did not qualify							17	14	3	0	0
(Cricket West Indies) (United States) 2024	Group stage	16/20	4	1	3	0	0	6	5	1	0	0
(India) (Sri Lanka) 2026	Did not qualify							5	3	2	0	0
(Australia) (New Zealand) 2028	To be determined							To be determined				
Total	0 Titles	1/10	4	1	3	0	0	78	49	27	0	2

=== T20 World Cup Qualifier ===
T20 World Cup Qualifier records
Year	Round	Position	Pld	W	L	T	NR	Qual.
(Ireland) 2008	Not eligible							
(United Arab Emirates) 2010	Not eligible							
(United Arab Emirates) 2012	Play-offs	14/16	9	2	7	0	0	DNQ
(United Arab Emirates) 2013	Play-offs	13/16	8	2	5	0	1	DNQ
(Ireland) (Scotland) 2015	Did not qualify							
(United Arab Emirates) 2019	Did not qualify							
(Zimbabwe) 2022	Play-offs	5/8	5	3	2	0	0	DNQ
(To be determined) 2028	To be determined							
Total	0 Titles	3/8	22	7	14	0	1	—N/a

=== African Games ===
African Games record
Year	Round	Position	Pld	W	L	T	NR
(Ghana) 2023	Semi-finals	3/8	5	4	1	0	0
Total	0 titles	1/1	5	4	1	0	0

=== Other global tournaments ===
CWC Challenge League (List A)	ICC Intercontinental Cup (FC)	World Cricket League (LA/ODI/50 overs)
2019–22 (B): Runners-up; 2024–26 (B): Runners-up	2004: First round; 2005: First round; 2006: Did not participate; 2007–08: Did not participate	2007 (Division Three) : Winners (▲); 2007 (Division Two) : 5th place (▼); 2009 (Division Three) : Runners-up (▲); 2011 (Division Two) : 5th place (▼); 2013 (Division Three) : Runners-up; 2014 (Division Three) : Runners-up (▲); 2015 (Division Two) : 5th place (▼); 2017 (Division Three) : 5th place (▼); 2018 (Division Four) : Winners (▲); 2018 (Division Three) : 6th place

=== Other regional tournaments ===
T20WC Africa Regional Final (T20I)	T20WC Africa Sub-regional Qualifiers (T20I)	ACA Africa T20 Cup (T20I)	Continent Cup T20 Africa (T20I)	East Africa T20 Cup (T20I)
2019 : 4th place (DNQ); 2021 : Winners (Q); 2023 : Runners-up (Q); 2025 : 5th place (DNQ); 2027: To be determined	2018: Runners-up (Q); 2021: Winners (Q); 2022: Received a bye; 2024: Received a bye; 2026: Runners-up (Q)	2022: Winners; 2023: Winners	2023: Winners; 2024: Winners; 2026: Runners-up	2022: Winners; 2023: Winners

== Records and statistics ==
International Match Summary — Uganda

Last updated 25 October 2026

Playing Record
Format	M	W	L	T	NR	Inaugural Match
Twenty20 Internationals	132	101	28	0	3	20 May 2019

=== Twenty20 International ===
- Highest team total: 229/3 v Botswana, 9 December 2024 at Gahanga International Cricket Stadium, Kigali
- Highest individual score: 100*, Simon Ssesazi v Tanzania, 22 December 2022 at Gahanga International Cricket Stadium, Kigali
- Best individual bowling figures: 6/7, Dinesh Nakrani v Lesotho, 19 October 2021 at IPRC Cricket Ground, Kigali

Most T20I runs for Uganda

Player	Runs	Average	Career span
Simon Ssesazi	2,204	29.00	2021–2024
Riazat Ali Shah	1,944	34.71	2019–2026
Roger Mukasa	1186	23.25	2019–2024
Dinesh Nakrani	1,144	25.42	2019–2025
Robinson Obuya	1,117	25.38	2023–2026

Most T20I wickets for Uganda

Player	Wickets	Average	Career span
Henry Ssenyondo	124	13.55	2019–2024
Alpesh Ramjani	108	10.50	2022–2026
Dinesh Nakrani	96	15.29	2019–2025
Juma Miyagi	79	13.17	2022–2026
Frank Nsubuga	76	15.23	2019–2025

T20I record versus other nations

Records complete to T20I #4220. Last updated 25 October 2026.

Opponent	M	W	L	T	NR	First match	First win
vs Full Members
Afghanistan	1	0	1	0	0	4 June 2024	
New Zealand	1	0	1	0	0	14 June 2024	
West Indies	1	0	1	0	0	8 June 2024	
Zimbabwe	2	1	1	0	0	26 November 2023	26 November 2023
vs Associate Members
Bahrain	2	1	1	0	0	28 October 2024	29 October 2024
Botswana	12	12	0	0	0	20 May 2019	20 May 2019
Eswatini	1	1	0	0	0	19 October 2021	19 October 2021
Gambia	1	1	0	0	0	23 October 2026	23 October 2026
Ghana	4	4	0	0	0	23 May 2019	23 May 2019
Hong Kong	2	2	0	0	0	11 July 2022	11 July 2022
Jersey	1	1	0	0	0	15 July 2022	15 July 2022
Kenya	21	14	6	0	1	22 May 2019	15 September 2021
Lesotho	2	2	0	0	0	19 October 2021	19 October 2021
Malawi	3	3	0	0	0	16 October 2021	16 October 2021
Mozambique	3	3	0	0	0	18 September 2022	18 September 2022
Namibia	9	1	8	0	0	21 May 2019	9 April 2022
Netherlands	1	0	1	0	0	14 July 2022	
Nigeria	14	13	1	0	0	11 September 2021	11 September 2021
Papua New Guinea	2	1	1	0	0	12 July 2022	5 June 2024
Qatar	3	1	2	0	0	12 February 2020	15 February 2020
Rwanda	23	22	1	0	0	17 October 2021	17 October 2021
Seychelles	1	1	0	0	0	22 October 2021	22 October 2021
Sierra Leone	2	2	0	0	0	9 September 2026	9 September 2026
Tanzania	17	12	3	0	2	18 November 2021	18 November 2021
United Arab Emirates	2	2	0	0	0	19 July 2025	19 July 2025
Zambia	1	1	0	0	0	20 October 2026	20 October 2026

== Personnel ==
=== Current squad ===
This lists all the players who were part of the most recent One-day or T20I squad. Uncapped players are listed in italics. Updated as of 31 August 2023.

Name	Age	Batting style	Bowling style	Forms	Notes
Batters
Simon Ssesazi	30	Right-handed	Right-arm medium	One-day & T20I	
Ronak Patel	38	Right-handed	Slow left-arm orthodox	One-day & T20I	
Arnold Otwani	31	Right-handed	Slow left-arm orthodox	One-day	
Pascal Murungi	22	Right-handed	Right-arm medium	One-day & T20I	
Ronald Lutaaya	23	Left-handed	Right-arm medium	One-day & T20I	
Roger Mukasa	37	Right-handed	Right-arm off break	T20I	
Robinson Obuya	25	Right-handed		One-day	
All-rounders
Kenneth Waiswa	27	Right-handed	Right-arm medium	One-day & T20I	Vice-captain
Riazat Ali Shah	28	Right-handed	Right-arm medium	One-day & T20I	
Brian Masaba	35	Right-handed	Right-arm leg break	One-day & T20I	Captain
Alpesh Ramjani	32	Left-handed	Slow left-arm orthodox	One-day & T20I	
Wicketkeepers
Fred Achelam	25	Right-handed	Slow left-arm orthodox	One-day	
Cyrus Kakuru	23	Right-handed	Slow left-arm orthodox	One-day & T20I	
Spin Bowlers
Henry Ssenyondo	33	Right-handed	Slow left-arm orthodox	One-day & T20I	
Cosmas Kyewuta	24	Right-handed	Right-arm off break	One-day & T20I	
Joseph Baguma	22	Right-handed	Right-arm off break	One-day	
Siraje Nsubuga	25	Right-handed	Right-arm off break	T20I	
Pace Bowlers
Dinesh Nakrani	35	Left-handed	Left-arm medium	One-day	
Juma Miyagi	23	Right-handed	Right-arm medium	One-day	
Bilal Hassan	36	Right-handed	Right-arm medium-fast	One-day & T20I	
Pius Oloka	23	Right-handed	Right-arm medium-fast	One-day	
David Wabwire	27	Right-handed	Right-arm medium-fast	T20I	
Jonathan Ssebanja	38	Right-handed	Left-arm medium	T20I	
Charles Waiswa	28	Left-handed	Left-arm medium	One-day	

== Coaching staff ==
Position	Name
Team manager	
Head coach	Steve Tikolo
Batting coach	
Bowling coach	
Fielding coach	
Physiotherapist	
Strength and conditioning coach	
Analyst	

== Captains ==
Name	Began	Ended
John Wild	1952	1957
Dr. Ian McAdam	1955	1955
William Handley	1956	1956
Allan Boucher	1957	1957
Ed Wilson	1958	1958
Premji Patel	1958	1959
Shashikant Patel	1959	1959
John Sequeira	1959	1960
Ron Meredew	1960	1961
Mangaldas Kotecha	1961	1962
Peter de Souza	1962	1966
Maqsood Malik	1966	1968
Kishore Vasani	1968	1969
Salaudin Khan	1969	1970
Charlie de Souza	1970	1971
Mushtaq Ramji	1971	1971

== Coaches ==
Name	Nationality	Appointed	Ended	Tournament(s)
William Kamanyi	Uganda	1998	April 2001	—
Andrew Meya	Uganda	April 2001	December 2003	2001 ICC Trophy
Tom Tikolo	Kenya	December 2003	August 2004	—
Henry Okecho	Uganda	September 2004	March 2007	2005 ICC Trophy
Sam Walusimbi	Uganda	April 2007	November 2007	2007 WCL Div. 3
Francis Otieno	Kenya	November 2007	July 2008	2007 WCL Div. 2
Barney Mohamed	South Africa	July 2008	October 2010	2009 World Cup Qualifier
Shukri Conrad	South Africa	October 2010	January 2011	—
Martin Suji	Kenya	February 2011	May 2013	2011 WCL Div. 2; 2012 WT20 Qualifier; 2013 WCL Div. 3
Henry Okecho (acting)	Uganda	May 2013	July 2013	—
Johan Rudolph	South Africa	July 2013	February 2014	2013 WT20 Qualifier; 2014 World Cup Qualifier
Davis Turinawe	Uganda	April 2014	August 2014	—
Peter Kirsten	South Africa	August 2014	Jan 2016	2014 WCL Div. 3; 2015 WCL Div. 2
Steve Tikolo	Kenya	May 2016	December 2019	
Laurence Mahatlane	South Africa	July 2020	October 2023	
Abhay Sharma	India	April 2024	October 2025	
Steve Tikolo	Kenya	March 2026		

== See also ==
- Uganda women's national cricket team
- List of Uganda Twenty20 International cricketers
