= Roger Mukasa =

Ugandan cricketer

Personal information
- Full name: Roger Galwanao Mukasa
- Born: 22 May 1989 (age 37); Kampala, Uganda
- Batting: Right-handed
- Bowling: Right-arm medium
- Role: Occasional wicket-keeper

International information
- National side: Uganda (2019–present)
- T20I debut (cap 5): 20 May 2019 v Botswana
- Last T20I: 9 June 2023 v Botswana

Domestic team information
- Years: Team
- 2018-: Rwenzori Warriors

Career statistics
Competition	T20I	FC	LA
Matches	9	3	34
Runs scored	95	189	904
Batting average	10.55	31.50	26.58
100s/50s	0/1	1/0	1/4
Top score	26	121	117
Balls bowled	66	96	408
Wickets	0	0	10
Bowling average	–	–	33.00
5 wickets in innings	–	–	0
10 wickets in match	–	–	0
Best bowling	–	–	4/21
Catches/stumpings	2/0	0/–	10/2
- Source: ESPNCricinfo, 9 June 2023

Roger Galwanao Mukasa (born 22 August 1989) is a Ugandan international cricketer. Mukasa bats and bowls right-handed and also occasionally plays as a wicket-keeper. He has represented Uganda in first-class, List A and Twenty20 cricket. His shirt number is 37. He played in the 2006 U-19 Cricket World Cup in Sri Lanka.

== Career ==
Mukasa was selected in Uganda's squad for the 2006 Under-19 Cricket World Cup. He played against the Pakistan U-19 team, which won the tournament.

In April 2018, he was named as the captain of the Uganda squad for the 2018 ICC World Cricket League Division Four tournament in Malaysia. In July 2018, he was part of Uganda's squad in the Eastern sub region group for the 2018–19 ICC World Twenty20 Africa Qualifier tournament.

In September 2018, he was named as the captain of Uganda's squad for the 2018 Africa T20 Cup. The following month, he was named as the captain of Uganda's squad for the 2018 ICC World Cricket League Division Three tournament in Oman.

In May 2019, he was named as the captain of Uganda's squad for the Regional Finals of the 2018–19 ICC T20 World Cup Africa Qualifier tournament in Uganda. He made his Twenty20 International (T20I) debut against Botswana on 20 May 2019. In July 2019, he was among the 25 players included in the Ugandan training squad, ahead of the Cricket World Cup Challenge League fixtures in Hong Kong. He was part of Uganda's squad, announced in November 2019, for the Cricket World Cup Challenge League B tournament in Oman.

In May 2024, he was named in Uganda's squad for the 2024 ICC Men's T20 World Cup tournament.
