= Juma Miyagi =

Ugandan cricketer (born 2003)

Personal information
- Born: 5 April 2003 (age 23); Kampala, Uganda
- Batting: Right-handed
- Bowling: Right-arm fast-medium
- Role: Bowler

International information
- National side: Uganda (2022–present)
- T20I debut (cap 26): 10 April 2022 v Namibia
- Last T20I: 5 June 2024 v Papua New Guinea
- T20I shirt no.: 57
- Source: Cricinfo, 8 June 2024

Juma Miyagi (born 5 April 2003) is a Ugandan cricketer. He made his international debut for the Uganda national cricket team in 2022 and plays as a right-arm pace bowler.

== Early life and education ==
Miyagi grew up in Naguru on the outskirts of Kampala, in what has been described as a slum district.

== Career ==
He initially played tennis before becoming interested in cricket.

Miyagi represented the Uganda national under-19 cricket team at the 2022 Under-19 Cricket World Cup in the West Indies. He finished with 13 wickets from five matches, the most for Uganda and fifth-most of any player in the tournament, including 4/25 against Scotland, 4/29 against Papua New Guinea and 3/33 against South Africa.

Miyagi has played in various domestic and regional competitions including the ICC CWC Challenge League B where he was player of the Match in a key win over Tanzania by taking 6 wickets for 17 runs helping Uganda finish unbeaten in the Hong Kong leg of the tournament.

In 2022, Miyagi was awarded a central contract by the Uganda Cricket Association. He made his Twenty20 International debut against Namibia in April 2022.

In May 2024, Miyagi was named in Uganda's squad for the 2024 ICC Men's T20 World Cup tournament. He was selected as the Uganda's new national cricket team captain during the Pearl of Africa T20-series from July 17, 2025 to July 28 at the lakeside Entebbe cricket oval. Juma Miyagi and Sirajje Nsubuga were also nominated in the silver foreign category of the 2025 PSL Draft.

== See also ==
- Salaudin Khan
- Junior Kwebiha
- Arthur Kyobe
