= Robinson Obuya =

Ugandan cricketer (born 2000)

Personal information
- Born: 12 December 2000 (age 25); Jinja, Uganda
- Batting: Right-handed
- Role: Batsman

International information
- National side: Uganda (2023–present)
- T20I debut (cap 35): 11 June 2023 v Rwanda
- Last T20I: 5 June 2024 v Papua New Guinea
- T20I shirt no.: 82
- Source: Cricinfo, 8 June 2024

Robinson Obuya (born 12 December 2000) is a Ugandan cricketer. He made his international debut for the Uganda national cricket team in 2023 and plays as a right-handed top-order batsman.

== Early life and education ==
Obuya grew up in Jinja, Uganda, and attended St James Secondary School and later Jinja Senior Secondary School in 2013.

He is not directly related to Kenya's Obuya brothers Kennedy, David and Collins. He initially preferred football and joined the Andy Mwesigwa Soccer Academy in Jinja under the tutelage of former national captain Andrew Mwesigwa, with aspirations to play international football.

He was introduced to cricket in 2013 and joined his first club in 2017 and has remained with the same team, the Sale Lions Cricket Club, since leaving secondary school.

Obuya worked hard on his game at the local level in Jinja with his coaches and his consistent performance eventually earned him a place on the national squad for the T20 World Cup Qualifiers.

== Career ==
Obuya began playing cricket in 2013 while in secondary school in Jinja and joined his long-standing club team, Sale Lions Cricket Club, in 2017.

He made his Twenty20 International debut for Uganda against Rwanda in June 2023 in the 2023 Continent Cup T20 Africa in Kenya.

Obuya was named in Uganda's squad for the 2024 ICC Men's T20 World Cup. In the opening match against Afghanistan he scored Uganda's first six at an ICC World Cup.

== See also ==
- Uganda cricket association
- Uganda National Cricket Team
- Andrew Mwesigwa
