= Uganda Cricket Association =

Governing body for the sport of cricket in Uganda

Cricket Uganda
- Sport: Cricket
- Abbreviation: CU
- Affiliation: International Cricket Council
- Regional affiliation: ACA
- Headquarters: Plot 2-10 Coronation Avenue
- Location: Kampala, Uganda
- Chairman: Michael Nuwagaba
- CEO: Alan Mugume
- Secretary: Alvin Bagaya Mboijana
- Sponsor: Endiro Coffee, Karveli, Plascon Paints

Official website
- www.ugandacricket.com
- (Uganda)

Cricket Uganda controls and organises all tours and matches undertaken by the Uganda national cricket team and Uganda women's national cricket team. It is the governing body for the sport of cricket in Uganda. Its current headquarters is in Kampala, Uganda. Cricket Uganda is Uganda's representative at the International Cricket Council and is an associate member and has been a member of that body since 1998. It is also a member of the African Cricket Association.

Alan Mugume is the CEO of CU (Cricket Uganda) Davis Turinawe is the Development Manager.

== History ==
In 1939, the first School Cricket Week was held featuring four schools in Uganda. Afterwards in 1966, they hosted their first professional tournament. The inaugural East African Championship was played and the hosts Uganda were the champions. In 1998, Uganda became an associate member of International Cricket Council (ICC).

== Governance of Uganda cricket ==
- Presidents and Chairmen of Uganda Cricket Association
1. Fred Luswata (1997 – 2000)
2. Francis Kazinduki (July 2000 – 2002)
3. Ivan Kyayonka (2003 – 2006)
4. William Kibukamusoke (2007 – February 2008)
5. Kato Sebbale (February 2008 – February 2012)
6. Richard Mwami (February 2012 – February 2017)
7. Bashir Badu (February 2017 – March 2019)
8. Michael Nuwagaba (March 2019 - Present)
- Secretary
1. Chris Azuba (1999 – February 2001)
2. Justine Ligyalingi (February 2001 – 2006)
3. Bashir Badu (2007 – 2009)
4. Jackson Kavuma (2012 – 2016)
5. Jeremy Kibukamusoke (2016 – February 2017)
6. Eric Kamara (February 2017 – December 2017)
7. Michael Nuwagaba (February 2017 – March 2019)
8. Alvin Bagaya Mboijana (March 2019-Present)
- Chief executing officers and directors:
1. Justine Ligyanlingi (April 2010 – March 2018)
2. Martin Ondeko (March 2018 – June 2022)
3. Alan Mugume (July 2022- ongoing)
- Managers
1. Rober Kisubi
2. Bashir Badu (2009 – 2010)

== See also ==
- Uganda national cricket team
- Uganda women's national cricket team
- Uganda national under-19 cricket team
- Uganda women's national under-19 cricket team
