= Alpesh Ramjani =

Ugandan cricketer (born 1994)

Personal information
- Full name: Alpesh Ravilal Ramjani
- Born: 24 September 1994 (age 32); Mumbai, Maharashtra, India
- Batting: Left-handed
- Bowling: Slow left-arm orthodox
- Role: All-rounder

International information
- National side: Uganda (2022–present)
- T20I debut (cap 28): 15 September 2022 v Botswana
- Last T20I: 3 June 2024 v Afghanistan

Career statistics
Competition	T20I
Matches	39
Runs scored	569
Batting average	25.86
100s/50s	0/2
Top score	78
Balls bowled	787
Wickets	70
Bowling average	8.88
5 wickets in innings	–
10 wickets in match	–
Best bowling	4/9
Catches/stumpings	15/–
- Source: Cricinfo, 3 June 2024

Alpesh Ramjani Ravilal (born 24 September 1994) is an Indian-born all-rounder cricketer who plays for the Uganda national cricket team.

== Personal life ==
Ramjani was born on 24 September 1994 in Mumbai,Maharashtra, India. As a schoolboy he played alongside Shreyas Iyer, Shivam Dube and Suryakumar Yadav. He completed a Bachelor of Commerce at Rizvi College of Engineering in Mumbai.

Beyond cricket, his hobbies include adventure and horse riding. He enjoys Chinese food and lists his dream destination as the Swiss Alps. Ramjani got married in 2020.

== Career ==
Ramjani moved to Uganda to play cricket after losing his job during the COVID-19 pandemic. He was invited to Uganda by Ugandan national team player Dinesh Nakrani, a family friend.

In September 2022, he was named in Uganda's squad for the 2022 ACA Africa T20 Cup for the first time. He made his Twenty20 International debut in the tournament against Botswana.

In August 2023, Ramjani was named in national side's squad for the 2023 East Africa T20 Cup, in which he was the highest wicket-taker with 25 wickets in 12 matches. In November 2023, he was named in the Uganda's squad for the 2022–23 ICC Men's T20 World Cup Africa Qualifier Regional Final, which went on to qualify for the 2024 ICC Men's T20 World Cup. He finished the tournament as the second highest wicket-taker with 12 wickets in 6 matches.

Ramjani established a new record for the most T20I wicket-taker in a calendar year in 2023, finishing with 55 wickets. He was subsequently named in the ICC Men's T20I Team of the Year for 2023.

In May 2024, he was named in Uganda's squad for their maiden World Cup appearance at 2024 ICC Men's T20 World Cup. He played his first match at the World Cup on 3 June 2024 against Afghanistan and West Indies.

Ramjani made history by becoming the first Ugandan player to be signed for a franchise tournament, joining the Chitwan Rhinos in the Nepal Premier League (NPL) in late 2025.

== Awards and recognition ==
- ICC Men's T20I Team of the Year (2023): Ramjani was selected as one of the 11 outstanding individuals in T20I cricket for the calendar year 2023.
- ICC Men's T20I Cricketer of the Year (Nomination): He was also one of four players shortlisted for the main 2023 ICC T20I Player of the Year award, which was ultimately won by Suryakumar Yadav.
- World Record (Most T20I Wickets in a Calendar Year): His 55 wickets in 2023 set a new benchmark globally for T20 Internationals.
- "Best Developmental Player" (T20 Mumbai League): Early in his career, he won this award in the T20 Mumbai League in 2018.
- Player of the Tournament/Match Awards: Ramjani has received multiple Player of the Match and Player of the Tournament awards in various regional competitions, such as the ACA Africa T20 Cup and the East Africa T20 Cup.
- Career Records: He holds the record for the best career T20I bowling average and has one of the best T20I economy rates globally.
