= Brian Masaba =

Ugandan cricketer

Personal information
- Born: 12 September 1991 (age 35); Kampala, Uganda
- Batting: Right-handed
- Role: Batsman

International information
- National side: Uganda
- T20I debut (cap 14): 23 May 2019 v Ghana
- Last T20I: 5 June 2024 v Papua New Guinea
- Source: Cricinfo, 25 December 2022

Brian Masaba (born 12 September 1991) is a Ugandan cricketer and the current captain of the Uganda cricket team.

== Career ==
He played for Uganda in the 2014 Cricket World Cup Qualifier tournament. In April 2018, he was named Uganda's vice-captain for the 2018 ICC World Cricket League Division Four tournament in Malaysia.

In July 2018, he was part of Uganda's squad in the Eastern sub region group for the 2018–19 ICC World Twenty20 Africa Qualifier tournament. He was the vice-captain of Uganda's squad at the 2018 Africa T20 Cup and the 2018 ICC World Cricket League Division Three tournament in Oman.

In May 2019, he was named in Uganda's squad for the Regional Finals of the 2018–19 ICC T20 World Cup Africa Qualifier tournament in Uganda. He made his Twenty20 International (T20I) debut against Ghana on 23 May 2019. In July 2019, he was among the 25 players included in the Ugandan training squad, ahead of the Cricket World Cup Challenge League fixtures in Hong Kong.

In November 2019, ahead of the 2019 Oman Cricket World Cup Challenge League B tournament, Masaba was made captain of the Uganda national cricket team. In November 2021, he was named as the captain of Uganda's squad for the Regional Final of the 2021 ICC Men's T20 World Cup Africa Qualifier tournament in Rwanda. In May 2022, he was named as the captain of Uganda's side for the 2022 Uganda Cricket World Cup Challenge League B tournament.

In May 2024, he was named the captain in Uganda’s squad for the 2024 ICC Men's T20 World Cup tournament.
