= Kenneth Waiswa =

Ugandan cricketer

Personal information
- Full name: Kenneth Waiswa
- Born: 11 November 1998 (age 28); Jinja, Uganda
- Nickname: Wai
- Batting: Right-handed
- Bowling: Right-arm medium
- Role: Allrounder

International information
- National side: Uganda
- T20I debut (cap 17): 12 February 2020 v Qatar
- Last T20I: 23 December 2022 v Tanzania
- Source: Cricinfo, 25 December 2022

Kenneth Waiswa (born 11 November 1998) is a Ugandan cricketer. In April 2018, he was named in Uganda's squad for the 2018 ICC World Cricket League Division Four tournament in Malaysia. He played in Uganda's second match of the tournament, against Bermuda. Prior to the World Cricket League tournament, he was part of Uganda's under-19 team for the 2015 Under-19 Cricket World Cup Qualifier.

In July 2018, Waiswa was part of Uganda's squad in the Eastern sub-region group for the 2018–19 ICC World Twenty20 Africa Qualifier tournament. In September 2018, he was named in Uganda's squad for the 2018 Africa T20 Cup, and made his Twenty20 debut in that tournament on 15 September 2018. The following month, he was named in Uganda's squad for the 2018 ICC World Cricket League Division Three tournament in Oman.

In July 2019, he was among the 25 players included in the Ugandan training squad, ahead of the Cricket World Cup Challenge League fixtures in Hong Kong. In November 2019, Waiswa was named in Uganda's squad for the Cricket World Cup Challenge League B tournament in Oman. He made his List A debut against Kenya, on 5 December 2019.

In February 2020, he was named in Uganda's team for their three-match Twenty20 International (T20I) series against Qatar. He made his T20I debut against Qatar, on 12 February 2020. In November 2021, he was named in Uganda's squad for the Regional Final of the 2021 ICC Men's T20 World Cup Africa Qualifier tournament in Rwanda. In May 2022, he was named in Uganda's side for the 2022 Uganda Cricket World Cup Challenge League B tournament.

In May 2024, he was named in Uganda’s squad for the 2024 ICC Men's T20 World Cup tournament.

== Personal life ==
Waiswa was raised in Jinja. He attended Jinja Senior Secondary School and Busoga College Mwiri.
