= Frank Nsubuga =

Ugandan cricketer

Personal information
- Full name: Franco Nsubuga
- Born: 28 August 1980 (age 46); Nsambya, Kampala, Uganda
- Batting: Right-handed
- Bowling: Right arm off break

International information
- National sides: Uganda (2001–2024); East and Central Africa (1997)
- T20I debut (cap 7): 20 May 2019; Uganda v Botswana
- Last T20I: 29 November 2023; Uganda v Kenya

Career statistics
| Competition | T20I | FC | LA | T20 |
|---|---|---|---|---|
| Matches | 23 | 7 | 52 | 48 |
| Runs scored | 19 | 385 | 796 | 258 |
| Batting average | 3.80 | 35.00 | 18.95 | 9.55 |
| 100s/50s | 0/0 | 0/2 | 0/3 | 0/0 |
| Top score | 9 | 64 | 98 | 30 |
| Balls bowled | 492 | 1,211 | 2,555 | 1,025 |
| Wickets | 20 | 20 | 48 | 38 |
| Bowling average | 20.25 | 27.80 | 33.12 | 24.07 |
| 5 wickets in innings | 0 | 0 | 0 | 0 |
| 10 wickets in match | 0 | 0 | 0 | 0 |
| Best bowling | 3/9 | 4/20 | 4/39 | 3/9 |
| Catches/stumpings | 5/– | 10/– | 24/– | 10/– |
- Source: Cricket Archive, 25 December 2022

Franco "Frank" Nsubuga (born 28 August 1980 in Uganda) is a Ugandan cricketer. A right-handed batsman and off spin bowler, he has played for the Uganda national cricket team since 2001. His matches include seven first-class matches and fifty-two List A matches. He has also developed a cult following especially with this participation at the 2024 ICC Men's T20 World Cup also enhanced his reputation.

== Biography ==
He was born in a family of seven other siblings in the Lugogo neighborhood in the Uganda capital city of Kampala. He took inspiration to take up cricket from his parents. His father worked in Lugogo area as a bar man and his mother was also employed serving lunch to cricket clubs in the area.

He was initially bowling medium pace, but he later transformed into a spinner after being convinced to do so by Samuel Walusimbi who had represented East Africa at the 1975 Cricket World Cup. He insists that he never had an intake of alcohol in his lifetime, which has kept him fit and healthy to prolong his cricketing career. He also engages in 8-10K run everyday and hits the gym prior to engaging in net training practice sessions.

== Playing career ==
Nsubuga made his international debut playing for East and Central Africa in the 1997 ICC Trophy when aged just 16.

He played for Uganda in the 2001 tournament. His first-class debut came in April 2004 against Namibia in the ICC Intercontinental Cup. Uganda won the match, with Nsubuga being named man of the match. He also played against Kenya later in the year. He again played against Kenya and Namibia in the 2005 ICC Intercontinental Cup. He made his List A debut in 2005, representing Uganda at the 2005 ICC Trophy.

He has continued to play in the Ugandan team and represented them in Division Three of the World Cricket League in Darwin, Australia in 2007. Uganda won the tournament, with Nsubuga named man of the match in the final against Argentina after scoring 55 from 38 balls and taking 4/27.

In April 2018, he was named in Uganda's squad for the 2018 ICC World Cricket League Division Four tournament in Malaysia. In July 2018, he was part of Uganda's squad in the Eastern sub region group for the 2018–19 ICC World Twenty20 Africa Qualifier tournament.

In September 2018, he was named in Uganda's squad for the 2018 Africa T20 Cup. The following month, he was named in Uganda's squad for the 2018 ICC World Cricket League Division Three tournament in Oman.

In May 2019, he was named in Uganda's squad for the Regional Finals of the 2018–19 ICC T20 World Cup Africa Qualifier tournament in Uganda. He made his Twenty20 International (T20I) debut for Uganda against Botswana on 20 May 2019. In July 2019, he was one of twenty-five players named in the Ugandan training squad, ahead of the Cricket World Cup Challenge League fixtures in Hong Kong. In November 2019, he was named in Uganda's squad for the Cricket World Cup Challenge League B tournament in Oman.

In November 2021, he was named in Uganda's squad for the Regional Final of the 2021 ICC Men's T20 World Cup Africa Qualifier tournament in Rwanda. In May 2022, he was named in Uganda's side for the 2022 Uganda Cricket World Cup Challenge League B tournament.

In May 2024, he was named in Uganda’s squad for the 2024 ICC Men's T20 World Cup tournament. He was also the oldest player to feature at the 2024 ICC Men's T20 World Cup at the age of 43. On his first T20 World Cup match against the Papua New Guinea, he displayed a scintillating bowling performance restricting the opponents to just 77 runs with a tight bowling spell giving away only four runs in his four overs and also captured two wickets in addition to two maiden overs, giving no room for the batsmen to work with. His bowling eventually helped Uganda to record their historic first ever win in any senior ICC tournament as well as in the ICC T20 World Cup. His spell of 4-2-4-2 also was the most economical bowling spell by any bowler in the history of ICC Men's T20 World Cup for a short period, until Lockie Ferguson broke the record once again against Papua New Guinea.
