= Riazat Ali Shah =

Ugandan cricketer

Personal information
- Born: 20 February 1998 (age 28); Gilgit, Gilgit Baltistan, Pakistan
- Batting: Right-handed
- Bowling: Right-arm medium
- Role: All-rounder

International information
- National side: Uganda (2018–present)
- T20I debut (cap 9): 20 May 2019 v Botswana
- Last T20I: 4 June 2024 v Afghanistan
- T20I shirt no.: 22

Career statistics
Competition	T20I	LA	T20
Matches	58	15	61
Runs scored	1,223	234	1,285
Batting average	34.62	26.00	34.72
100s/50s	0/4	0/2	0/4
Top score	98*	59	98*
Balls bowled	754	552	808
Wickets	40	19	43
Bowling average	21.27	22.15	22.00
5 wickets in innings	0	0	0
10 wickets in match	0	0	0
Best bowling	4/12	4/38	4/12
Catches/stumpings	22/–	9/–	23/–
- Source: Cricinfo, 16 January 2024

Riazat Ali Shah (born 20 February 1998) is a Pakistani-born Ugandan cricketer who has played for the Uganda national cricket team since 2018. He is an all-rounder who bats right-handed and bowls right-arm medium pace.

== Early life ==
Shah was born on 20 February 1998 in Gilgit, Pakistan, the son of Meher Nigar and Hidayat Shah. He is an Isma'ili muslim. He played cricket at the under-19 level for Gilgit-Baltistan and Islamabad.

== International career ==
Shah moved to Uganda at the age of 16, where he began playing for Aziz Damani Sports Club in Kampala.

In April 2018, he was named in Uganda's squad for the 2018 ICC World Cricket League Division Four tournament in Malaysia. He played in Uganda's opening match of the tournament, against Malaysia. In July 2018, he was part of Uganda's squad in the Eastern sub-region group for the 2018–19 ICC World Twenty20 Africa Qualifier tournament. He was named the player of the tournament for the Eastern group.

In September 2018, he was named in Uganda's squad for the 2018 Africa T20 Cup. He made his Twenty20 debut for Uganda in the 2018 Africa T20 Cup on 14 September 2018. The following month, he was named in Uganda's squad for the 2018 ICC World Cricket League Division Three tournament in Oman. He was the joint-leading wicket-taker for Uganda in the tournament, with six dismissals in five matches.

In May 2019, Shah was named in Uganda's squad for the Regional Finals of the 2018–19 ICC T20 World Cup Africa Qualifier tournament in Uganda. He made his Twenty20 International (T20I) debut against Botswana on 20 May 2019. He finished as the leading run-scorer in the Regional Finals, with 140 runs in four matches.

In July 2019, he was one of twenty-five players named in the Ugandan training squad, ahead of the Cricket World Cup Challenge League fixtures in Oman. In November 2019, he was named in Uganda's squad for the Cricket World Cup Challenge League B tournament in Oman. He made his List A debut, for Uganda against Jersey, on 2 December 2019. In November 2021, he was named in Uganda's squad for the Regional Final of the 2021 ICC Men's T20 World Cup Africa Qualifier tournament in Rwanda. In May 2022, he was named in Uganda's side for the 2022 Uganda Cricket World Cup Challenge League B tournament.

In May 2024, he was named in Uganda’s squad for the 2024 ICC Men's T20 World Cup tournament.
