= List of Uganda Twenty20 International cricketers =

This is a list of Ugandan Twenty20 International cricketers.

In April 2018, the International Cricket Council (ICC) decided to grant full Twenty20 International (T20I) status to all its members. Therefore, all Twenty20 matches played between Uganda and other ICC members after 1 January 2019 will be eligible for T20I status.

This list comprises all members of the Uganda cricket team who have played at least one T20I match. It is initially arranged in the order in which each player won his first Twenty20 cap. Where more than one player won his first Twenty20 cap in the same match, those players are listed alphabetically by surname. Uganda played their first T20I match on 20 May 2019 against Botswana at the ICC T20 World Cup Africa Qualifier Finals.

== Key ==
General

- ‡ – Captain
- † – Wicket-keeper
- First – Year of debut
- Last – Year of latest game
- Mat – Number of matches played

Batting

- Runs – Runs scored in career
- HS – Highest score
- Avg – Runs scored per dismissal
- * – Batsman remained not out
- 50 – Number of half centuries
- 100 – Centuries scored

Bowling

- Balls – Balls bowled in career
- Wkt – Wickets taken in career
- BBI – Best bowling in an innings
- Ave – Average runs per wicket

Fielding

- Ca – Catches taken
- St – Stumpings affected

== List of players ==
Statistics are correct as of 25 October 2026.

Uganda T20I cricketers
General					Batting					Bowling				Fielding		Ref
No.	Name	First	Last	Mat	Runs	HS	Avg	50	100	Balls	Wkt	BBI	Ave	Ca	St	Ref
1	Zephania Arinaitwe	2019	2020	6	50	15	8.33	0	0	–	–	–	–	0	0	
2	Emmanuel Isaneez	2019	2019	3	8	7*	–	0	0	56	1	1/16	53.00	0	0	
3	Hamu Kayondo	2019	2021	4	104	31	26.00	0	0	–	–	–	–	0	0	
4	Deusdedit Muhumuza‡	2019	2022	32	324	59*	23.14	2	0	256	14	5/13	20.64	5	0	
5	Roger Mukasa‡	2019	2024	58	1,186	89	23.25	5	0	66	0	–	–	26	0	
6	Dinesh Nakrani	2019	2025	82	1,144	77*	25.42	3	0	1,548	96	6/7	15.29	19	0	
7	Frank Nsubuga	2019	2025	72	181	31*	10.05	0	0	1,475	76	3/8	15.23	18	0	
8	Arnold Otwani‡†	2019	2022	17	202	44	12.62	0	0	–	–	–	–	5	0	
9	Riazat Ali Shah‡	2019	2026	91	1,944	98*	34.71	7	0	928	49	4/12	21.87	37	0	
10	Henry Ssenyondo	2019	2025	95	25	5*	3.12	0	0	1,921	124	5/8	13.55	10	0	
11	Charles Waiswa	2019	2021	10	20	14*	20.00	0	0	174	13	4/38	16.91	4	0	
12	Rogers Olipa	2019	2019	2	3	3	3.00	0	0	6	0	–	–	1	0	
13	Fred Achelam†	2019	2024	48	195	28	10.83	0	0	–	–	–	–	26	6	
14	Brian Masaba‡	2019	2024	63	439	37*	16.88	0	0	434	24	3/8	16.20	31	0	
15	Frank Akankwasa	2020	2022	32	228	66	14.25	1	0	358	20	4/10	18.95	3	0	
16	Trevor Bukenya	2020	2021	4	21	12*	–	0	0	84	3	2/19	44.33	0	0	
17	Kenneth Waiswa‡	2020	2026	87	825	66*	15.86	1	0	756	53	4/14	17.54	45	0	
18	Cosmas Kyewuta	2021	2026	50	148	24*	13.45	0	0	985	66	4/5	17.03	10	0	
19	Ronak Patel	2021	2024	42	805	68*	25.96	4	0	–	–	–	–	6	0	
20	Saud Islam	2021	2021	20	452	75	26.58	3	0	–	–	–	–	5	0	
21	Jonathan Ssebanja	2021	2023	9	13	8	3.25	0	0	186	13	3/17	18.76	2	0	
22	Bilal Hassan	2021	2024	45	117	20*	13.00	0	0	832	65	4/17	13.47	8	0	
23	Simon Ssesazi†	2021	2024	88	2,204	100*	29.00	17	1	–	–	–	–	21	0	
24	Gerald Mubiru	2021	2021	3	–	–	–	–	–	54	2	2/13	12.00	1	0	
25	Richard Agamiire	2021	2021	2	–	–	–	–	–	36	1	1/1	9.00	0	0	
26	Juma Miyagi‡	2022	2026	52	267	29	9.88	0	0	1019	79	5/7	13.17	17	0	
27	Pascal Murungi	2022	2024	37	252	31	14.00	0	0	66	3	2/16	25.33	14	0	
28	Alpesh Ramjani	2022	2026	70	891	78	24.75	5	0	1,411	108	5/17	10.50	24	0	
29	Joseph Baguma	2022	2026	35	55	11*	9.16	0	0	651	55	4/14	11.61	8	0	
30	Ismail Munir	2022	2022	1	0	0*	–	0	0	–	–	–	–	0	0	
31	Cyrus Kakuru†	2022	2026	59	238	38	10.34	0	0	–	–	–	–	32	21	
32	Ronald Lutaaya	2022	2026	32	383	70	13.67	1	0	–	–	–	–	5	0	
33	Emmanuel Hasahya	2022	2022	5	21	9	4.20	0	0	–	–	–	–	2	0	
34	Siraje Nsubuga	2023	2023	15	2	1*	1.00	0	0	253	17	3/22	17.29	3	0	
35	Robinson Obuya	2023	2026	55	1117	118*	25.38	6	1	–	–	–	–	19	0	
36	David Wabwire	2023	2023	7	13	13*	13.00	0	0	127	7	3/24	21.28	1	0	
37	Shrideep Mangela	2024	2025	16	361	65*	24.06	2	0	–	–	–	–	2	0	
38	Raghav Dhawan	2024	2026	26	585	56	27.85	3	0	12	1	1/26	26.00	13	0	
39	Matthew Musinguzi	2025	2026	15	18	14	18.00	0	0	294	16	3/23	19.06	3	0	
40	Innocent Mwebaze	2025	2025	2	–	–	–	–	–	36	1	1/19	32.00	0	0	
41	Calvin Watuwa	2025	2025	2	–	–	–	–	–	–	–	–	–	1	0	
42	Sumeet Verma	2025	2026	10	259	88	43.16	1	0	–	–	–	–	5	0	
43	Gaurav Tomar†	2025	2025	2	51	33	25.50	0	0	–	–	–	–	0	0	
44	Anas Baig†	2026	2026	9	100	66	12.50	1	0	–	–	–	–	1	0	
45	Charles Musemez†	2026	2026	9	214	89	26.75	1	0	–	–	–	–	3	2	
46	Olipa Gerald	2026	2026	14	495	95	55.00	4	0	52	3	3/1	11.33	4	0	
47	Enock Kasaija	2026	2026	10	0	0*	–	0	0	210	19	4/4	9.94	2	0	
48	Fahad Mutagana	2026	2026	2	10	5	5.00	0	0	–	–	–	–	1	0	
49	Pius Oloka	2026	2026	2	–	–	–	–	–	24	1	1/14	14.00	1	0	
