= 2024 Men's T20 World Cup Africa Sub-regional Qualifier B =

Cricket qualification tournament

2024 ICC Men's T20 World Cup Africa Sub-regional Qualifier B
- Dates: 19 – 24 October 2024
- Administrator: ICC Africa
- Cricket format: Twenty20 International
- Tournament format: Round-robin
- Host: Kenya
- Champions: Zimbabwe
- Runners-up: Kenya
- Participants: 6
- Matches: 15
- Most runs: (Kenya) Rakep Patel (231)
- Most wickets: (Zimbabwe) Sikandar Raza (10)

The 2024 ICC Men's T20 World Cup Africa Sub-regional Qualifier B was a cricket tournament that formed part of the qualification process for the 2026 Men's T20 World Cup. It was hosted by Kenya in October 2024.

Zimbabwe won the qualifier with a 100 per cent record and advanced to the regional final. Kenya also advanced after finishing in second place. They will be joined in the regional final by Namibia and Uganda, who were given a bye after having participated in the previous T20 World Cup, and four other teams from sub-regional qualifiers A and C.

== Squads ==
Kenya	Gambia	Mozambique	Rwanda	Seychelles	Zimbabwe
Shem Ngoche (c); Sachin Bhudia; Sachin Gill; Dhiren Gondaria; Irfan Karim (wk); Peter Langat; Neil Mugabe; Francis Mutua; Gerard Mwendwa; Lucas Oluoch; Rakep Patel; Rushab Patel; Vraj Patel; Pushkar Sharma	Ismaila Tamba (c); Basiru Jaye (vc); Asim Ashraf; Ousman Bah (wk); Frank Campbell; Andre Jarju; Baboucarr Jaye; Musa Jobarteh; Abubacarr Kuyateh; Muhammed Manga (wk); Arjunsingh Rajpurohit; Gabriel Riley; Shan Siddiqui; Mustapha Suwareh	Filipe Cossa (c); Manussur Algi; Eugenio Azine; Francisco Couana; Joao Huo; Jose Joao; Antonio Laice; Dario Macome; Mario Manjate; Agostinho Navicha; Farruque Nhaduate; Camate Raposo; Laurenco Salomone; Vieira Tembo	Clinton Rubagumya (c); Martin Akayezu; Zappy Bimenyimana; Yves Cyusa; Daniel Gumyusenge; Eric Kubwimana; Oscar Manishimwe (wk); Israel Mugisha; Muhammad Nadir; Didier Ndikubwimana; Wilson Niyitanga; Isaie Niyomugabo; Ignace Ntirenganya; Emile Rukiruza	Tim Horpinitch (c); Rashen de Silva; Nagarajan Gnanapragasam; Hirani Harji; Jobayer Hossen; Mazharul Islam; Harsha Madhushanka; Stephen Madusanka; Manikandan Mariyappan; Shanmugasundram Mohan (wk); Naidoo Krishnasamy; Thiwanka Rajapaksha; Sohail Rocket; Samarathunga Rukmal	Sikandar Raza (c); Faraz Akram; Brian Bennett; Ryan Burl; Trevor Gwandu; Clive Madande (wk); Wesley Madhevere; Tinotenda Maposa; Tadiwanashe Marumani; Wellington Masakadza; Brandon Mavuta; Tashinga Musekiwa; Blessing Muzarabani; Dion Myers; Richard Ngarava

== Pre-tournament match ==
18 October 2024
09:30
Scorecard

Kenya; 177/6 (20 overs)	v	Seychelles; 86 (17 overs)
Sachin Gill 47* (15); Naidoo Krishnasamy 2/22 (4 overs)		Mazharul Islam 29 (33); Vraj Patel 3/18 (4 overs)

Kenya won by 91 runs
Sikh Union Club Ground, Nairobi
Umpires: Paul Anjere (Ken) and Shashikant Sanghani (Ken)
Player of the match: Rushab Patel (Ken)

- Kenya won the toss and elected to bat.
- Sachin Gill (Ken), Harsha Madhushanka and Manikandan Mariyappan (Sey) all made their T20I debuts.

== Points table ==
Qualifier B standings
Pos	Team	Pld	W	L	NR	Pts	NRR	Qualification
1	Zimbabwe	5	5	0	0	10	8.893	Advanced to the regional final
2	Kenya (H)	5	4	1	0	8	3.108	Advanced to the regional final
3	Mozambique	5	3	2	0	6	−1.259	Eliminated
4	Rwanda	5	2	3	0	4	−1.853	Eliminated
5	Seychelles	5	1	4	0	2	−4.425	Eliminated
6	Gambia	5	0	5	0	0	−7.219	Eliminated

Source: ESPNcricinfo
(H) Host

== Fixtures ==
19 October 2024
09:30
Scorecard

Gambia	v	Rwanda

Rwanda won by walkover
Gymkhana Club Ground, Nairobi
Umpires: David Odhiambo (Ken) and Percival Sizara (Zim)

- No toss.
- Some of Gambia's players missed a flight and did not arrive in Kenya in time for the match.

19 October 2024
13:50
Scorecard

Zimbabwe; 286/5 (20 overs)	v	Seychelles; 18/2 (6.1 overs)
Brian Bennett 91 (35); Jobayer Hossen 2/36 (4 overs)		Tim Horpinitch 8 (18); Richard Ngarava 1/1 (1 over)

Zimbabwe won by 76 runs (DLS method)
Gymkhana Club Ground, Nairobi
Umpires: Lubabalo Gcuma (SA) and Isaac Oyieko (Ken)
Player of the match: Brian Bennett (Zim)

- Seychelles won the toss and elected to field.
- No further play was possible due to rain.
- Tim Horpinitch, Jobayer Hossen (Sey) and Tashinga Musekiwa (Zim) all made their T20I debuts.

19 October 2024
13:50
Scorecard

Kenya; 224/4 (20 overs)	v	Mozambique; 76/8 (16 overs)
Rakep Patel 120 (55); Francisco Couana 2/40 (4 overs)		Filipe Cossa 23 (27); Shem Ngoche 3/16 (4 overs)

Kenya won by 111 runs (DLS method)
Ruaraka Sports Club Ground, Nairobi
Umpires: Stephen Harris (SA) and Forster Mutizwa (Zim)
Player of the match: Rakep Patel (Ken)

- Mozambique won the toss and elected to field.
- Mozambique were set a revised target of 188 runs in 16 overs due to rain.
- Eugenio Azine (Moz) made his T20I debut.
- Rakep Patel (Ken) scored his first century in T20Is.

20 October 2024
09:30
Scorecard

Mozambique; 56 (13.1 overs)	v	Zimbabwe; 57/1 (5 overs)
Agostinho Navicha 14 (18); Richard Ngarava 4/16 (4 overs)		Brian Bennett 31 (19); Dario Macome 1/19 (2 overs)

Zimbabwe won by 9 wickets
Gymkhana Club Ground, Nairobi
Umpires: Stephen Harris (SA) and Morshed Ali Khan (Ban)
Player of the match: Richard Ngarava (Zim)

- Zimbabwe won the toss and elected to field.

20 October 2024
09:30
Scorecard

Gambia	v	Seychelles

Seychelles won by walkover
Ruaraka Sports Club Ground, Nairobi
Umpires: Charles Kariuki (Ken) and Isaac Oyieko (Ken)

- No toss.

20 October 2024
13:50
Scorecard

Rwanda; 100/7 (20 overs)	v	Kenya; 101/5 (15 overs)
Didier Ndikubwimana 29 (38); Lucas Oluoch 2/14 (3 overs)		Sachin Bhudia 39 (21); Zappy Bimenyimana 2/19 (4 overs)

Kenya won by 5 wickets
Gymkhana Club Ground, Nairobi
Umpires: Lubabalo Gcuma (SA) and Percival Sizara (Zim)
Player of the match: Sachin Bhudia (Ken)

- Rwanda won the toss and elected to bat.

22 October 2024
09:30
Scorecard

Mozambique; 158/5 (20 overs)	v	Seychelles; 98 (18.5 overs)
Francisco Couana 47 (35); Jobayer Hossen 2/29 (4 overs)		Shanmugasundram Mohan 18 (26); Dario Macome 3/25 (4 overs)

Mozambique won by 60 runs
Gymkhana Club Ground, Nairobi
Umpires: Lubabalo Gcuma (SA) and Charles Kariuki (Ken)
Player of the match: Francisco Couana (Moz)

- Mozambique won the toss and elected to bat.

22 October 2024
13:50
Scorecard

Kenya; 175/9 (20 overs)	v	Gambia; 46 (12.4 overs)
Rakep Patel 63 (40); Andreh Jarju 3/40 (4 overs)		Asim Ashraf 19 (28); Gerard Mwendwa 5/7 (4 overs)

Kenya won by 129 runs
Gymkhana Club Ground, Nairobi
Umpires: Lubabalo Gcuma (SA) and Forster Mutizwa (Zim)
Player of the match: Gerard Mwendwa (Ken)

- Kenya won the toss and elected to bat.
- Asim Ashraf, Basiru Jaye, Arjunsingh Rajpurohit and Shan Siddiqui (Gam) all made their T20I debuts.

22 October 2024
13:50
Scorecard

Zimbabwe; 240/8 (20 overs)	v	Rwanda; 91 (18 overs)
Dion Myers 96 (45); Muhammad Nadir 3/47 (4 overs)		Didier Ndikubwimana 36 (42); Sikandar Raza 5/18 (4 overs)

Zimbabwe won by 149 runs
Ruaraka Sports Club Ground, Nairobi
Umpires: Morshed Ali Khan (Ban) and David Odhiambo (Ken)
Player of the match: Sikandar Raza (Zim)

- Zimbabwe won the toss and elected to bat.
- Sikandar Raza (Zim) took his first five-wicket haul in T20Is.

23 October 2024
09:30
Scorecard

Seychelles; 74 (20 overs)	v	Kenya; 78/1 (10.3 overs)
Rashen de Silva 33 (34); Shem Ngoche 3/9 (4 overs)		Neil Mugabe 33* (35); Naidoo Krishnasamy 1/19 (1.3 overs)

Kenya won by 9 wickets
Ruaraka Sports Club Ground, Nairobi
Umpires: Morshed Ali Khan (Ban) and Percival Sizara (Zim)
Player of the match: Shem Ngoche (Ken)

- Seychelles won the toss and elected to bat.
- Nagarajan Gnanapragasam (Sey) made his T20I debut.

23 October 2024
13:50
Scorecard

Rwanda; 86/8 (20 overs)	v	Mozambique; 87/3 (15.1 overs)
Clinton Rubagumya 28* (42); Joao Hou 3/13 (4 overs)		Francisco Couana 31* (25); Muhammad Nadir 2/15 (4 overs)

Mozambique won by 7 wickets
Gymkhana Club Ground, Nairobi
Umpires: Charles Kariuki (Ken) and Forster Mutizwa (Zim)
Player of the match: Francisco Couana (Moz)

- Rwanda won the toss and elected to bat.
- Isae Niyomugabo (Rwa) made his T20I debut.

23 October 2024
13:50
Scorecard

Zimbabwe; 344/4 (20 overs)	v	Gambia; 54 (14.4 overs)
Sikandar Raza 133* (43); Andreh Jarju 2/53 (4 overs)		Andreh Jarju 12* (12); Brandon Mavuta 3/10 (4 overs)

Zimbabwe won by 290 runs
Ruaraka Sports Club Ground, Nairobi
Umpires: David Odhiambo (Ken) and Isaac Oyieko (Ken)
Player of the match: Sikandar Raza (Zim)

- Zimbabwe won the toss and elected to bat.
- Sikandar Raza became the first player for Zimbabwe to score a century in men's T20Is.
- Zimbabwe's total was the highest team total in men's T20Is.
- Musa Jobarteh (Gam) recorded the most expensive bowling figures (0/93) in all men's Twenty20 status cricket.

24 October 2024
09:30
Scorecard

Rwanda; 146/9 (20 overs)	v	Seychelles; 73/9 (20 overs)
Isaie Niyomugabo 39 (31); Jobayer Hossen 5/25 (4 overs)		Stephen Madusanka 17 (30); Yves Cyusa 3/6 (3 overs)

Rwanda won by 73 runs
Ruaraka Sports Club Ground, Nairobi
Umpires: Morshed Ali Khan (Ban) and Forster Mutizwa (Zim)
Player of the match: Yves Cyusa (Rwa)

- Rwanda won the toss and elected to bat.
- Jobayer Hossen (Sey) took his first five-wicket haul in T20Is.

24 October 2024
13:50
Scorecard

Zimbabwe; 163/7 (20 overs)	v	Kenya; 102 (19.1 overs)
Ryan Burl 61 (43); Lucas Oluoch 4/37 (4 overs)		Lucas Oluoch 24 (19); Trevor Gwandu 3/10 (3.1 overs)

Zimbabwe won by 61 runs
Gymkhana Club Ground, Nairobi
Umpires: Lubabalo Gcuma (SA) and Stephen Harris (SA)
Player of the match: Ryan Burl (Zim)

- Zimbabwe won the toss and elected to bat.

24 October 2024
13:50
Scorecard

Gambia; 142/5 (20 overs)	v	Mozambique; 143/4 (18.5 overs)
Abubacarr Kuyateh 33 (29); Camate Raposo 2/22 (4 overs)		Francisco Couana 76* (50); Abubacarr Kuyateh 1/16 (3 overs)

Mozambique won by 6 wickets
Ruaraka Sports Club Ground, Nairobi
Umpires: David Odhiambo (Ken) and Percival Sizara (Zim)
Player of the match: Francisco Couana (Moz)

- Gambia won the toss and elected to bat.
- Baboucarr Jaye (Gam) made his T20I debut.
