= 2024 Cricket World Cup Challenge League A (Kenya) =

Cricket tournament

2024 Kenya Cricket World Cup Challenge League A
- Dates: 25 September – 5 October 2024
- Administrator: International Cricket Council
- Cricket format: List A
- Tournament format: Round-robin
- Host: Kenya
- Participants: 6
- Matches: 15
- Player of the series: (Denmark) Saif Ahmad
- Most runs: (Kenya) Rakep Patel (284)
- Most wickets: (Papua New Guinea) Kabua Morea (15)

The 2024 Kenya Cricket World Cup Challenge League A was the inaugural round of Group A matches of the 2024–2026 Cricket World Cup Challenge League, a cricket tournament which formed part of the qualification pathway to the 2027 Cricket World Cup. In August 2024, it was confirmed that Cricket Kenya would host the tournament. The series took place from September to October 2024, with all the matches having List A status.

Jersey won four of their five matches to sit at the top of Challenge League A after the first stage.

== Squads ==
Denmark	Jersey	Kenya	Kuwait	Papua New Guinea	Qatar
Hamid Shah (c); Saif Ahmad; Surya Anand; Taranjit Bharaj (vc, wk); Oliver Hald; Abdul Hashmi (wk); Jonas Henriksen; Eshan Karimi; Delawar Khan; Zameer Khan; Nicolaj Laegsgaard; Abdullah Mahmood; Shangeev Thanikaithasan; Shakeel Zeb	Charles Perchard (c); Daniel Birrell; Charlie Brennan; Harrison Carlyon; Jake Dunford (wk); Patrick Gouge; Nick Greenwood; Jonty Jenner; Josh Lawrenson; Stanley Norman; Will Perchard; Julius Sumerauer; Asa Tribe; Zak Tribe	Shem Ngoche (c); Sachin Bhudia; Sachin Gill; Dhiren Gondaria; Irfan Karim; Peter Langat; Neil Mugabe; Francis Mutua; Gerard Mwendwa; Lucas Oluoch; Rakep Patel; Rushab Patel; Vraj Patel; Pushkar Sharma	Mohammed Aslam (c); Muhammad Amin; Clinto Anto; Meet Bhavsar; Shiraz Khan; Nimish Lathif; Ahmed Mirza; Sayed Monib; Usman Patel; Yasin Patel; Ravija Sandaruwan; Mohamed Shafeeq; Bilal Tahir; Ali Zaheer	Assad Vala (c); Charles Amini; Sese Bau; Michael Charlie; Kiplin Doriga; Hiri Hiri; John Kariko; Kabua Morea; Alei Nao; Patrick Nou; Nosaina Pokana; Gaudi Toka; Tony Ura; Hila Vare	Kamran Khan (c); Assad Borham; Amir Farooq; Rifayi Hassainar; Zaheer Ibrahim; Muhammad Jabir; Shakkir Kassim; Ikramullah Khan; Imal Liyanage; Mujeeb-ur-Rehman; Muhammad Murad; Mohammed Nadeem; Tamoor Sajjad; Muhammad Tanveer

== Fixtures ==
25 September 2024
09:30
Scorecard

Denmark; 308/9 (50 overs)	v	Kuwait; 310/8 (49.2 overs)
Saif Ahmad 140 (109); Yasin Patel 5/48 (10 overs)		Usman Patel 120 (97); Saif Ahmad 4/47 (10 overs)

Kuwait won by 2 wickets
Gymkhana Club Ground, Nairobi
Umpires: Stephen Harris (SA) and Isaac Oyieko (Ken)
Player of the match: Saif Ahmad (Den)

- Denmark won the toss and elected to bat.
- Eshan Karimi (Den) and Ali Zaheer (Kuw) both made their List A debuts.
- Yasin Patel (Kuw) took his first five-wicket haul in List A cricket.
- Saif Ahmad (Den) and Usman Patel (Kuw) both scored their first century in List A cricket.

25 September 2024
09:30
Scorecard

Jersey; 207 (48.4 overs)	v	Kenya; 208/4 (38.5 overs)
Jonty Jenner 47 (33); Rakep Patel 6/28 (9 overs)		Rakep Patel 84* (76); Julius Sumerauer 2/51 (9.5 overs)

Kenya won by 6 wickets
Ruaraka Sports Club Ground, Nairobi
Umpires: Akbar Ali (UAE) and Rahul Asher (Oma)
Player of the match: Rakep Patel (Ken)

- Kenya won the toss and elected to field.
- Charlie Brennan, Patrick Gouge, Zak Tribe (Jer), Sachin Gill, Peter Langat, Neil Mugabe and Pushkar Sharma (Ken) all made their List A debuts.

26 September 2024
09:30
Scorecard

Jersey; 320 (49.5 overs)	v	Qatar; 152 (40.4 overs)
Zak Tribe 100 (81); Amir Farooq 5/42 (8.5 overs)		Imal Liyanage 51 (76); Nick Greenwood 5/38 (10 overs)

Jersey won by 168 runs
Gymkhana Club Ground, Nairobi
Umpires: Rahul Asher (Oma) and Arno Jacobs (SA)
Player of the match: Nick Greenwood (Jer)

- Qatar won the toss and elected to field.
- Amir Farooq, Muhammad Jabir, Shakkir Kassim, Tamoor Sajjad and Mujeeb-ur-Rehman (Qat) all made their List A debuts.
- Amir Farooq (Qat) took his first five-wicket haul in List A cricket.
- Zak Tribe (Jer) scored his first century in List A cricket.
- Nick Greenwood (Jer) took his first five-wicket haul in List A cricket.

26 September 2024
09:30
Scorecard

Denmark; 80 (26.4 overs)	v	Papua New Guinea; 83/4 (13.3 overs)
Abdul Hashmi 21 (34); Kabua Morea 5/29 (9.4 overs)		Hiri Hiri 28* (16); Saif Ahmad 2/23 (4 overs)

Papua New Guinea won by 6 wickets
Ruaraka Sports Club Ground, Nairobi
Umpires: Rockie D'Mello (Ken) and Stephen Harris (SA)
Player of the match: Kabua Morea (PNG)

- Papua New Guinea won the toss and elected to field.
- Abdullah Mahmood (Den) and Michael Charlie (PNG) both made their List A debuts.

28 September 2024
09:30
Scorecard

Papua New Guinea; 112 (37.3 overs)	v	Jersey; 113/3 (23 overs)
Charles Amini 30 (63); Julius Sumerauer 3/24 (8 overs)		Josh Lawrenson 28 (55); Kabua Morea 2/55 (8 overs)

Jersey won by 7 wickets
Gymkhana Club Ground, Nairobi
Umpires: Akbar Ali (UAE) and Isaac Oyieko (Ken)
Player of the match: Harrison Carlyon (Jer)

- Papua New Guinea won the toss and elected to bat.

28 September 2024
09:30
Scorecard

Kuwait; 298/9 (50 overs)	v	Qatar; 141/5 (28 overs)
Mohammed Aslam 63 (44); Ikramullah Khan 3/49 (9 overs)		Imal Liyanage 71 (73); Yasin Patel 2/19 (6 overs)

Kuwait won by 47 runs (DLS method)
Ruaraka Sports Club Ground, Nairobi
Umpires: Rockie D'Mello (Ken) and Stephen Harris (SA)
Player of the match: Mohammed Aslam (Kuw)

- Qatar won the toss and elected to field.

29 September 2024
09:30
Scorecard

Kenya; 268/6 (50 overs)	v	Denmark; 272/6 (49.3 overs)
Rakep Patel 85* (70); Surya Anand 1/21 (4 overs)		Zameer Khan 75 (83); Lucas Oluoch 2/38 (8 overs)

Denmark won by 4 wickets
Gymkhana Club Ground, Nairobi
Umpires: Rahul Asher (Oma) and Arno Jacobs (SA)
Player of the match: Zameer Khan (Den)

- Denmark won the toss and elected to field.

1 October 2024
09:30
Scorecard

Jersey; 219 (49.1 overs)	v	Kuwait; 96 (27 overs)
Zak Tribe 57 (57); Yasin Patel 3/16 (10 overs)		Mohammed Aslam 19 (30); Josh Lawrenson 5/29 (9 overs)

Jersey won by 123 runs
Gymkhana Club Ground, Nairobi
Umpires: Stephen Harris (SA) and Isaac Oyieko (Ken)
Player of the match: Josh Lawrenson (Jer)

- Kuwait won the toss and elected to field.
- Josh Lawrenson (Jer) took his first five-wicket haul in List A cricket.

1 October 2024
09:30
Scorecard

Qatar; 298/8 (50 overs)	v	Papua New Guinea; 299/3 (41.4 overs)
Kamran Khan 94 (97); Sese Bau 2/43 (10 overs)		Assad Vala 129* (114); Muhammad Murad 1/42 (7 overs)

Papua New Guinea won by 7 wickets
Ruaraka Sports Club Ground, Nairobi
Umpires: Rockie D'Mello (Ken) and Arno Jacobs (SA)
Player of the match: Assad Vala (PNG)

- Qatar won the toss and elected to bat.

2 October 2024
09:30
Scorecard

Qatar; 250 (49.2 overs)	v	Denmark; 256/7 (48.3 overs)
Tamoor Sajjad 58 (72); Saif Ahmad 5/38 (9.2 overs)		Saif Ahmad 76 (114); Muhammad Ikramullah 2/32 (9 overs)

Denmark won by 3 wickets
Gymkhana Club Ground, Nairobi
Umpires: Rahul Asher (Oma) and Isaac Oyieko (Ken)
Player of the match: Saif Ahmad (Den)

- Denmark won the toss and elected to field.

2 October 2024
09:30
Scorecard

Kuwait; 312/8 (50 overs)	v	Kenya; 215 (41.2 overs)
Ravija Sandaruwan 67 (52); Lucas Oluoch 2/38 (9 overs)		Pushkar Sharma 50 (45); Mohammed Aslam 3/37 (10 overs)

Kuwait won by 97 runs
Ruaraka Sports Club Ground, Nairobi
Umpires: Akbar Ali (UAE) and Arno Jacobs (SA)
Player of the match: Sayed Monib (Kuw)

- Kenya won the toss and elected to field.
- Gerard Mwendwa (Ken) and Nimish Lathief (Kuw) both made their List A debuts.

4 October 2024
09:30
Scorecard

Qatar; 162 (48.2 overs)	v	Kenya; 166/7 (35.4 overs)
Ikramullah Khan 42 (66); Sachin Gill 3/36 (9 overs)		Rushab Patel 63* (68); Mohammed Nadeem 3/44 (10 overs)

Kenya won by 3 wickets
Gymkhana Club Ground, Nairobi
Umpires: Akbar Ali (UAE) and Rockie D'Mello (Ken)
Player of the match: Rushab Patel (Ken)

- Qatar won the toss and elected to bat.

4 October 2024
09:30
Scorecard

Kuwait; 65 (22.1 overs)	v	Papua New Guinea; 66/2 (10 overs)
Mohammed Aslam 23 (37); Alei Nao 4/17 (10 overs)		Sese Bau 32 (26); Mohammed Aslam 1/3 (2 overs)

Papua New Guinea won by 8 wickets
Ruaraka Sports Club Ground, Nairobi
Umpires: Rahul Asher (Oma) and Arno Jacobs (SA)
Player of the match: Alei Nao (PNG)

- Papua New Guinea won the toss and elected to field.

5 October 2024
09:30
Scorecard

Kenya; 258/9 (50 overs)	v	Papua New Guinea; 262/9 (49.3 overs)
Rakep Patel 91 (104); Sese Bau 2/30 (6 overs)		Sese Bau 74 (84); Vraj Patel 2/36 (9.3 overs)

Papua New Guinea won by 1 wicket
Gymkhana Club Ground, Nairobi
Umpires: Akbar Ali (UAE) and Stephen Harris (SA)
Player of the match: Sese Bau (PNG)

- Papua New Guinea won the toss and elected to field.

5 October 2024
09:30
Scorecard

Jersey; 283/8 (50 overs)	v	Denmark; 231 (44.1 overs)
Josh Lawrenson 93 (119); Oliver Hald 2/39 (6 overs)		Hamid Shah 54 (69); Josh Lawrenson 3/45 (10 overs)

Jersey won by 52 runs
Ruaraka Sports Club Ground, Nairobi
Umpires: Rahul Asher (Oma) and Isaac Oyieko (Ken)
Player of the match: Josh Lawrenson (Jer)

- Denmark won the toss and elected to field.
- Stanley Norman (Jer) made his List A debut.
