= 2025 Pearl of Africa T20 Series =

Cricket tournament

- Dates: 17 – 27 July 2025
- Administrator: Uganda Cricket Association
- Cricket format: Twenty20 International and Twenty20
- Tournament format: Double round-robin
- Host: Uganda
- Champions: Uganda (2nd title)
- Runners-up: United Arab Emirates
- Participants: 5
- Matches: 18
- Most runs: (Uganda) Raghav Dhawan (228)
- Most wickets: (United Arab Emirates) Haider Ali (13)

The 2025 Pearl of Africa T20 Series was a men's Twenty20 International (T20I) cricket tournament played in Entebbe, Uganda, in July 2025. This was the second edition of the tournament, and is being organized by the Uganda Cricket Association. The participating teams were the hosts Uganda along with the national teams from Kenya and United Arab Emirates and the A team of Namibia. Kuwait was also originally scheduled to participate, but it was announced on 26 June that the tournament has been reduced to four teams. On 3 July, it was announced that Nigeria joined the tournament as the fifth team.

== Squads ==
Kenya	Namibia A	Nigeria	Uganda	United Arab Emirates
Dhiren Gondaria (c); Sachin Gill; Jasraj Kundi; Peter Langat; Francis Mutua; Gerard Mwendwa; Shem Ngoche; Lucas Oluoch; Rakep Patel; Vishil Patel; Vraj Patel; Pushkar Sharma; Tanzeel Sheikh; Sukhdeep Singh (wk)	Jan Balt (c); Liam Basson (wk); Peter-Daniel Blignaut; Jack Brassell; Adriaan Coetzee; Jan-Izak de Villiers; Zhivago Groenewald; Max Heingo; Junior Kariata; Handre Klazinge; Dylan Leicher; Dian Neethling (wk); Simon Shikongo; Zacheo van Vuuren	Sylvester Okpe (c); Vincent Adewoye; Peter Aho; David Ankrah; Solomon Chilemanya (wk); Isaac Danladi; Akhere Isesele; Abdulrahman Jimoh; Isaac Okpe; Olayinka Olaleye; Sulaimon Runsewe (wk); Selim Salau; Mohameed Taiwo; Prosper Useni	Juma Miyagi (c); Joseph Baguma; Raghav Dhawan; Cyrus Kakuru (wk); Cosmas Kyewuta; Ronald Lutaaya; Shrideep Mangela; Matthew Musinguzi; Innocent Mwebaze; Dinesh Nakrani; Frank Nsubuga; Robinson Obuya; Alpesh Ramjani; Calvin Watuwa	Muhammad Waseem (c); Haider Ali; Rahul Chopra (wk); Ethan D'Souza; Asif Khan; Matiullah Khan; Saghir Khan; Dhruv Parashar; Akif Raja; Muhammad Rohid; Aryansh Sharma; Alishan Sharafu; Muhammad Zohaib; Zuhaib Zubair

Uganda also named a separate "A" squad for their matches against Namibia A.

== Points table ==
Pos	Team	Pld	W	L	NR	Pts	NRR
1	Uganda	6	6	0	0	12	1.458
2	United Arab Emirates	6	4	2	0	8	2.032
3	Kenya	6	2	4	0	4	−0.855
4	Nigeria	6	0	6	0	0	−2.734

Source: ESPNcricinfo

== Fixtures ==
17 July 2025
13:30
Scorecard

Kenya; 108/8 (16 overs)	v	Nigeria; 88/9 (16 overs)
Tanzeel Sheikh 26 (20); Sylvester Okpe 4/11 (4 overs)		Prosper Useni 36 (19); Vraj Patel 3/5 (3 overs)

Kenya won by 20 runs
Entebbe Cricket Oval, Entebbe
Umpires: John Mayeku (Uga) and Isaac Oyieko (Ken)
Player of the match: Vraj Patel (Ken)

- Kenya won the toss and elected to bat.
- The match was reduced to 16 overs per side due to rain.

18 July 2025
09:30
Scorecard

Uganda; 180/4 (20 overs)	v	Nigeria; 85/5 (18 overs)
Robinson Obuya 58* (39); Prosper Useni 1/18 (2 overs)		Isaac Danladi 26 (44); Matthew Musinguzi 2/16 (3 overs)

Uganda won by 77 runs (DLS method)
Entebbe Cricket Oval, Entebbe
Umpires: Charles Kariuki (Ken) and Isaac Oyieko (Ken)
Player of the match: Robinson Obuya (Uga)

- Uganda won the toss and elected to bat.
- No further play was possible due to rain.
- Matthew Musinguzi (Uga) made his T20I debut.
- David Ankrah played in his first T20I for Nigeria after previously playing 4 T20Is for Ghana, becoming the twentieth cricketer to represent two international teams in men's T20Is.

18 July 2025
13:30
Scorecard

United Arab Emirates; 161/7 (20 overs)	v	Kenya; 121 (20 overs)
Rahul Chopra 45* (40); Sachin Gill 2/36 (4 overs)		Dhiren Gondaria 45 (42); Haider Ali 2/15 (4 overs)

United Arab Emirates won by 40 runs
Entebbe Cricket Oval, Entebbe
Umpires: Simon Kintu (Uga) and John Mayeku (Uga)
Player of the match: Rahul Chopra (UAE)

- United Arab Emirates won the toss and elected to bat.
- Muhammad Rohid (UAE) made his T20I debut.

19 July 2025
13:30
Scorecard

Uganda; 126/9 (20 overs)	v	United Arab Emirates; 120/8 (20 overs)
Raghav Dhawan 44 (42); Muhammad Rohid 3/23 (4 overs)		Muhammad Waseem 33 (28); Juma Miyagi 3/28 (4 overs)

Uganda won by 6 runs
Entebbe Cricket Oval, Entebbe
Umpires: John Mayeku (Uga) and Isaac Oyieko (Ken)
Player of the match: Alpesh Ramjani (Uga)

- Uganda won the toss and elected to bat.

21 July 2025
09:30
Scorecard

Nigeria; 58 (13.3 overs)	v	United Arab Emirates; 59/3 (4.5 overs)
Isaac Danladi 17 (27); Zuhaib Zubair 5/21 (3.3 overs)		Alishan Sharafu 36 (16); Prosper Useni 1/3 (1 over)

United Arab Emirates won by 7 wickets
Entebbe Cricket Oval, Entebbe
Umpires: James Bamulese (Uga) and Simon Kintu (Uga)
Player of the match: Zuhaib Zubair (UAE)

- Nigeria won the toss and elected to bat.
- Solomon Chilemanya and Abdulrahman Jimoh (Nga) both made their T20I debuts.
- Zuhaib Zubair (UAE) took his first five-wicket haul in T20Is.

21 July 2025
13:30
Scorecard

Uganda; 157/5 (20 overs)	v	Kenya; 129/7 (20 overs)
Raghav Dhawan 41 (39); Peter Langat 2/25 (3 overs)		Rakep Patel 58 (49); Frank Nsubuga 3/10 (3 overs)

Uganda won by 28 runs
Entebbe Cricket Oval, Entebbe
Umpires: Charles Kariuki (Ken) and Isaac Oyieko (Ken)
Player of the match: Frank Nsubuga (Uga)

- Uganda won the toss and elected to bat.

22 July 2025
13:30
Scorecard

Uganda; 147/6 (20 overs)	v	Nigeria; 109 (18.1 overs)
Shrideep Mangela 51 (42); Mohameed Taiwo 2/18 (4 overs)		Isaac Okpe 26* (20); Dinesh Nakrani 3/11 (3 overs)

Uganda won by 38 runs
Entebbe Cricket Oval, Entebbe
Umpires: James Bamulese (Uga) and Simon Kintu (Uga)
Player of the match: Shrideep Mangela (Uga)

- Uganda won the toss and elected to bat.
- Innocent Mwebaze and Calvin Watuwa (Uga) both made their T20I debuts.

23 July 2025
09:30
Scorecard

Kenya; 98 (20 overs)	v	United Arab Emirates; 101/3 (13.5 overs)
Pushkar Sharma 42 (39); Zuhaib Zubair 2/13 (4 overs)		Muhammad Zohaib 35* (36); Dhiren Gondaria 2/31 (3.5 overs)

United Arab Emirates won by 7 wickets
Entebbe Cricket Oval, Entebbe
Umpires: Charles Kariuki (Ken) and Isaac Oyieko (Ken)
Player of the match: Zuhaib Zubair (UAE)

- Kenya won the toss and elected to bat.

25 July 2025
09:30
Scorecard

Kenya; 124/8 (20 overs)	v	Uganda; 125/4 (18.1 overs)
Rakep Patel 37 (36); Cosmas Kyewuta 2/25 (4 overs)		Raghav Dhawan 32 (46); Lucas Oluoch 1/6 (1.1 overs)

Uganda won by 6 wickets
Entebbe Cricket Oval, Entebbe
Umpires: Charles Kariuki (Ken) and Simon Kintu (Uga)
Player of the match: Dinesh Nakrani (Uga)

- Uganda won the toss and elected to field.

26 July 2025
09:30
Scorecard

United Arab Emirates; 141/4 (20 overs)	v	Nigeria; 88 (18.5 overs)
Muhammad Zohaib 50 (48); Sulaimon Runsewe 1/14 (2 overs)		David Ankrah 24 (17); Ethan D'Souza 4/9 (2.5 overs)

United Arab Emirates won by 53 runs
Entebbe Cricket Oval, Entebbe
Umpires: James Bamulese (Uga) and Simon Kintu (Uga)
Player of the match: Ethan D'Souza (UAE)

- United Arab Emirates won the toss and elected to bat.

27 July 2025
09:30
Scorecard

Nigeria; 113/9 (20 overs)	v	Kenya; 116/4 (19.1 overs)
Sylvester Okpe 35 (37); Sachin Gill 2/10 (4 overs)		Sachin Gill 35 (42); Mohameed Taiwo 1/6 (1 over)

Kenya won by 6 wickets
Entebbe Cricket Oval, Entebbe
Umpires: Charles Kariuki (Ken) and Simon Kintu (Uga)
Player of the match: Sachin Gill (Ken)

- Nigeria won the toss and elected to bat.

27 July 2025
13:30
Scorecard

Uganda; 170/7 (20 overs)	v	United Arab Emirates; 162/9 (20 overs)
Alpesh Ramjani 61 (34); Akif Raja 2/31 (4 overs)		Ethan D'Souza 32 (17); Dinesh Nakrani 2/24 (4 overs)

Uganda won by 8 runs
Entebbe Cricket Oval, Entebbe
Umpires: John Mayeku (Uga) and Isaac Oyieko (Ken)
Player of the match: Alpesh Ramjani (Uga)

- Uganda won the toss and elected to bat.

== Additional T20 matches ==
17 July 2025
09:30
Scorecard

Namibia A 145/6 (20 overs)	v	Uganda A 143/5 (20 overs)
Jan Balt 48 (41); Baidhu Ivan 3/23 (4 overs)		Simon Ssesazi 66 (66); Jan-Izak de Villiers 2/20 ( 4 overs)

Namibia A won by 2 runs
Entebbe Cricket Oval, Entebbe
Umpires: James Bamulese (Uga) and Simon Kintu (Uga)
Player of the match: Jan Balt (Namibia A)

- Namibia A won the toss and elected to bat.

19 July 2025
09:30
Scorecard

Nigeria; 111 (19 overs)	v	Namibia A 115/2 (15.2 overs)
Sylvester Okpe 27 (28); Dylan Leicher 4/26 (4 overs)		Handre Klazinge 55* (40); Peter Aho 1/15 (3 overs)

Namibia A won by 8 wickets
Entebbe Cricket Oval, Entebbe
Umpires: James Bamulese (Uga) and Charles Kariuki (Ken)
Player of the match: Dylan Leicher (Namibia A)

- Nigeria won the toss and elected to bat.
- Liam Basson, Max Heingo, Dian Neethling, Zacheo van Vuuren (Namibia A) and Solomon Chilemanya (Nga) all made their T20 debuts.

22 July 2025
09:30
Scorecard

Namibia A 113/8 (20 overs)	v	Kenya; 83/7 (12.5 overs)
Jan-Izak de Villiers 33 (27); Peter Langat 3/28 (4 overs)		Lucas Oluoch 31* (17); Zacheo van Vuuren 2/9 (2 overs)

Kenya won by 3 wickets (DLS method)
Entebbe Cricket Oval, Entebbe
Umpires: Simon Kintu (Uga) and John Mayeku (Uga)
Player of the match: Lucas Oluoch (Ken)

- Kenya won the toss and elected to field.
- Kenya were set a revised target of 83 runs in 13 overs due to rain.

23 July 2025
13:30
Scorecard

Uganda A 127/8 (20 overs)	v	Namibia A 124/7 (20 overs)
Anas Baig 45 (31); Jan Balt 2/16 (3 overs)		Liam Basson 25 (26); Kenneth Waiswa 3/28 (4 overs)

Uganda A won by 3 runs
Entebbe Cricket Oval, Entebbe
Umpires: James Bamulese (Uga) and John Mayeku (Uga)
Player of the match: Anas Baig (Uganda A)

- Uganda A won the toss and elected to bat.

25 July 2025
13:30
Scorecard

Nigeria; 105/9 (20 overs)	v	Namibia A 99/8 (20 overs)
Olayinka Olaleye 34 (36); Jan-Izak de Villiers 2/6 (2 overs)		Jan Balt 35 (40); Isaac Danladi 2/13 (4 overs)

Nigeria won by 6 runs
Entebbe Cricket Oval, Entebbe
Umpires: John Mayeku (Uga) and Isaac Oyieko (Ken)
Player of the match: Abdulrahman Jimoh (Nga)

- Nigeria won the toss and elected to bat.
- Adriaan Coetzee (Namibia A) made his T20 debut.

26 July 2025
13:30
Scorecard

Kenya; 126/6 (20 overs)	v	Namibia A 123/2 (20 overs)
Dhiren Gondaria 39* (20); Zhivago Groenewald 2/17 (4 overs)		Zacheo van Vuuren 62 (53); Francis Mutua 1/24 (3 overs)

Kenya won by 3 runs
Entebbe Cricket Oval, Entebbe
Umpires: Charles Kariuki (Ken) and Isaac Oyieko (Ken)
Player of the match: Dhiren Gondaria (Ken)

- Kenya won the toss and elected to bat.
