= 2023 Men's T20 World Cup Africa regional final =

Cricket qualification tournament

2023 ICC Men's T20 World Cup Africa regional final
- Dates: 22 – 30 November 2023
- Administrator(s): International Cricket Council; Africa Cricket Association
- Cricket format: Twenty20 International
- Tournament format: Round-robin
- Host: Namibia
- Champions: Namibia
- Runners-up: Uganda
- Participants: 7
- Matches: 21
- Most runs: (Zimbabwe) Sikandar Raza (273)
- Most wickets: (Zimbabwe) Richard Ngarava (13)

The 2024 ICC Men's T20 World Cup was the ninth edition of the ICC Men's T20 World Cup, a biennial world cup for cricket in Twenty20 International (T20I) format, organised by the International Cricket Council (ICC). The qualification process for the world cup included two stages: direct qualification and regional qualification. The regional qualification for Africa was held in two stages: sub-regional qualifiers and regional final.

The Africa regional final was hosted by the Cricket Namibia from 22 to 30 November 2023. Namibia and Uganda qualified for the T20 World Cup after finishing atop the points table. Zimbabwe's Sikandar Raza scored the most runs (273), while Richard Ngarava took the most wickets (13) in the tournament.

== Teams and qualification ==
A total of 16 teams participated in the sub-regional phase, which was divided into two events with eight teams competing in each event. The top two sides of each sub-regional qualifier advanced to the regional final, where they joined Namibia and Zimbabwe, who received byes due to their participation in the 2022 T20 World Cup, and Uganda, who received a bye after taking part in the 2022 global qualifiers.

Method of qualification	Date	Venue(s)	No. of teams	Team
2022 Men's T20 World Cup	13 November 2022	Australia	2	Namibia
2022 Men's T20 World Cup	13 November 2022	Australia	2	Zimbabwe
2022 global qualifier B	17 July 2022	Zimbabwe	1	Uganda
Sub-regional qualifier A	17–25 November 2022	Rwanda	2	Kenya
Sub-regional qualifier A	17–25 November 2022	Rwanda	2	Rwanda
Sub-regional qualifier B	1–9 December 2022	Rwanda	2	Nigeria
Sub-regional qualifier B	1–9 December 2022	Rwanda	2	Tanzania
Total			7	

== Squads ==
Following squads were announced for the final:

- Kenya: Rakep Patel (c), Sachin Bhudia, Emmanuel Bundi, Irfan Karim (wk), Francis Mutua, Gerard Mwendwa, Shem Ngoche, Collins Obuya, Nelson Odhiambo, Lucas Oluoch, Rushab Patel, Vishil Patel, Vraj Patel, Pushkar Sharma, Sukhdeep Singh (wk)
- Namibia: Gerhard Erasmus (c), Michael van Lingen (vc), Niko Davin, Shaun Fouché, Jan Frylinck, Zane Green (wk), JP Kotze, Malan Kruger, Jan Nicol Loftie-Eaton, Tangeni Lungameni, Bernard Scholtz, Ben Shikongo, JJ Smit, David Wiese, Pikky Ya France
- Nigeria: Sylvester Okpe (c), Ademola Onikoyi (vc), Ridwan Abdulkareem, Sesan Adedeji, Peter Aho, Daniel Ajekun, Joshua Asia, Isaac Danladi, Akhere Isesele, Isaac Okpe, Sulaimon Runsewe, Ashmit Shrestha (wk), Mohameed Taiwo, Chiemelie Udekwe, Prosper Useni
- Rwanda: Clinton Rubagumya (c), Kevin Irakoze (vc), Martin Akayezu, Zappy Bimenyimana, Eric Dusingizimana, Hamza Khan, Eric Kubwimana, Oscar Manishimwe (wk), Muhammad Nadir, Didier Ndikubwimana (wk), Wilson Niyitanga, Eric Niyomugaba, Emile Rukiriza, Emmanuel Sebareme, Orchide Tuyisenge
- Tanzania: Abhik Patwa (c), Kassim Nassoro (vc), Akhil Anil, Harsheed Chohan, Mohammed Issa, Abdallah Jabiri, Salum Jumbe, Ally Kimote, Omary Kitunda (wk), Simba Mbaki, Dhrumit Mehta, Yalinde Nkanya, Johnson Nyambo, Amal Rajeevan (wk), Ivan Selemani, SanjayKumar Thakor
- Uganda: Brian Masaba (c), Bilal Hassan, Cyrus Kakuru (wk), Roger Mukasa, Dinesh Nakrani, Frank Nsubuga, Robinson Obuya, Ronak Patel, Alpesh Ramjani, Riazat Ali Shah, Jonathan Ssebanja, Henry Ssenyondo, Simon Ssesazi (wk), David Wabwire, Kenneth Waiswa
- Zimbabwe: Sikandar Raza (c), Ryan Burl, Tendai Chatara, Craig Ervine, Luke Jongwe, Innocent Kaia, Clive Madande (wk), Wesley Madhevere, Tadiwanashe Marumani, Wellington Masakadza, Carl Mumba, Blessing Muzarabani, Richard Ngarava, Nick Welch, Sean Williams

== Points table ==
Final standings
Pos	Team	Pld	W	L	NR	Pts	NRR	Qualification
1	Namibia (H)	6	6	0	0	12	2.658	Qualified for the 2024 Men's T20 World Cup
2	Uganda	6	5	1	0	10	1.334	Qualified for the 2024 Men's T20 World Cup
3	Zimbabwe	6	4	2	0	8	2.922	Eliminated
4	Kenya	6	3	3	0	6	−0.911	Eliminated
5	Nigeria	6	1	4	1	3	−1.026	Eliminated
6	Tanzania	6	1	5	0	2	−1.507	Eliminated
7	Rwanda	6	0	5	1	1	−4.303	Eliminated

Source: ESPNcricinfo
(H) Hosts

== Fixtures ==
22 November 2023
09:30 UTC+2
Scorecard

Kenya; 154/2 (20 overs)	v	Rwanda; 137/4 (20 overs)
Irfan Karim 63* (43); Clinton Rubagumya 1/20 (4 overs)		Orchide Tuyisenge 56 (44); Pushkar Sharma 1/19 (4 overs)

Kenya won by 17 runs
United Ground, Windhoek
Umpires: Sarah Dambanevana (Zim) and Andrew Louw (Nam)
Player of the match: Irfan Karim (Ken)

- Rwanda won the toss and elected to field.

22 November 2023
09:30 UTC+2
Scorecard

Tanzania; 99/7 (20 overs)	v	Uganda; 105/2 (15.2 overs)
SanjayKumar Thakor 22* (16); Alpesh Ramjani 3/26 (4 overs)		Riazat Ali Shah 47* (27); Akhil Anil 1/10 (2 overs)

Uganda won by 8 wickets
Wanderers Cricket Ground, Windhoek
Umpires: Lauren Agenbag (SA) and David Odhiambo (Ken)
Player of the match: Riazat Ali Shah (Uga)

- Uganda won the toss and elected to field.

22 November 2023
14:30 UTC+2
Scorecard

Zimbabwe; 132/8 (20 overs)	v	Namibia; 134/3 (14.4 overs)
Craig Ervine 36 (33); JJ Smit 3/24 (4 overs)		Niko Davin 89 (45); Richard Ngarava 1/20 (4 overs)

Namibia won by 7 wickets
Wanderers Cricket Ground, Windhoek
Umpires: Lubabalo Gcuma (SA) and Stephen Harris (SA)
Player of the match: Niko Davin (Nam)

- Namibia won the toss and elected to field.

23 November 2023
09:30 UTC+2
Scorecard

Nigeria; 121/7 (20 overs)	v	Kenya; 124/6 (19.5 overs)
Isaac Danladi 46* (46); Vraj Patel 2/17 (4 overs)		Rushab Patel 32 (38); Peter Aho 2/16 (4 overs)

Kenya won by 4 wickets
United Ground, Windhoek
Umpires: Forster Mutizwa (Zim) and Langton Rusere (Zim)
Player of the match: Shem Ngoche (Ken)

- Kenya won the toss and elected to field.

23 November 2023
14:30 UTC+2
Scorecard

Tanzania; 96/9 (20 overs)	v	Zimbabwe; 98/1 (10.4 overs)
Salum Jumbe 24* (14); Sikandar Raza 3/10 (4 overs)		Tadiwanashe Marumani 39* (27); SanjayKumar Thakor 1/6 (1 over)

Zimbabwe won by 9 wickets
United Ground, Windhoek
Umpires: Kehinde Olanbiwonnu (Nga) and Isaac Oyieko (Ken)
Player of the match: Sikandar Raza (Zim)

- Zimbabwe won the toss and elected to field.

24 November 2023
09:30 UTC+2
Scorecard

Nigeria; 33/2 (6 overs)	v	Rwanda
Daniel Ajekun 13* (20); Muhammad Nadir 1/15 (3 overs)

No result
Wanderers Cricket Ground, Windhoek
Umpires: Andrew Louw (Nam) and Forster Mutizwa (Zim)

- Rwanda won the toss and elected to field.
- No further play was possible due to rain.

24 November 2023
14:30 UTC+2
Scorecard

Uganda; 114 (19.4 overs)	v	Namibia; 116/4 (17 overs)
Ronak Patel 19 (21); David Wiese 4/17 (3.4 overs)		Gerhard Erasmus 35* (30); Alpesh Ramjani 3/13 (4 overs)

Namibia won by 6 wickets
Wanderers Cricket Ground, Windhoek
Umpires: Lubabalo Gcuma (SA) and Langton Rusere (Zim)
Player of the match: David Wiese (Nam)

- Namibia won the toss and elected to field.

25 November 2023
09:30 UTC+2
Scorecard

Kenya; 182/3 (20 overs)	v	Tanzania; 132 (20 overs)
Collins Obuya 81 (54); SanjayKumar Thakor 2/21 (4 overs)		Ivan Selemani 45 (44); Gerard Mwendwa 4/31 (4 overs)

Kenya won by 50 runs
Wanderers Cricket Ground, Windhoek
Umpires: Stephen Harris (SA) and Kehinde Olanbiwonnu (Nga)
Player of the match: Collins Obuya (Ken)

- Tanzania won the toss and elected to field.

25 November 2023
14:30 UTC+2
Scorecard

Namibia; 207/3 (20 overs)	v	Rwanda; 46/5 (10 overs)
Niko Davin 80 (59); Emile Rukiriza 1/34 (4 overs)		Clinton Rubagumya 15* (22); Gerhard Erasmus 1/2 (2 overs)

Namibia won by 68 runs (DLS method)
Wanderers Cricket Ground, Windhoek
Umpires: David Odhiambo (Ken) and Isaac Oyieko (Ken)
Player of the match: Niko Davin (Nam)

- Rwanda won the toss and elected to field.
- No further play was possible due to rain.

26 November 2023
09:30 UTC+2
Scorecard

Zimbabwe; 136/7 (20 overs)	v	Uganda; 138/5 (19.1 overs)
Sikandar Raza 48 (39); Dinesh Nakrani 3/14 (4 overs)		Riazat Ali Shah 42 (28); Richard Ngarava 2/24 (4 overs)

Uganda won by 5 wickets
United Ground, Windhoek
Umpires: Lauren Agenbag (SA) and Stephen Harris (SA)
Player of the match: Riazat Ali Shah (Uga)

- Uganda won the toss and elected to field.
- This was Uganda's first match and first win against a full member side in men's T20I cricket.

26 November 2023
14:30 UTC+2
Scorecard

Tanzania; 139/7 (20 overs)	v	Nigeria; 140/7 (18.4 overs)
Abhik Patwa 52 (40); Ridwan Abdulkareem 2/13 (3 overs)		Prosper Useni 31* (19); Ally Kimote 2/20 (3 overs)

Nigeria won by 3 wickets
United Ground, Windhoek
Umpires: Sarah Dambanevana (Zim) and David Odhiambo (Ken)
Player of the match: Prosper Useni (Nga)

- Tanzania won the toss and elected to bat.

27 November 2023
09:30 UTC+2
Scorecard

Kenya; 104/6 (20 overs)	v	Namibia; 106/4 (15.2 overs)
Irfan Karim 43* (47); Tangeni Lungameni 2/19 (3 overs)		Jan Frylinck 57* (41); Vraj Patel 2/19 (3 overs)

Namibia won by 6 wickets
United Ground, Windhoek
Umpires: Sarah Dambanevana (Zim) and Langton Rusere (Zim)
Player of the match: Jan Frylinck (Nam)

- Namibia won the toss and elected to field.

27 November 2023
09:30 UTC+2
Scorecard

Zimbabwe; 215/4 (20 overs)	v	Rwanda; 71 (18.4 overs)
Sikandar Raza 58 (36); Emmanuel Sebareme 2/34 (4 overs)		Didier Ndikubwimana 30 (34); Sikandar Raza 3/3 (2.4 overs)

Zimbabwe won by 144 runs
Wanderers Cricket Ground, Windhoek
Umpires: Lauren Agenbag (SA) and Lubabalo Gcuma (SA)
Player of the match: Sikandar Raza (Zim)

- Rwanda won the toss and elected to field.
- Sikandar Raza became the first bowler from Zimbabwe to take a hat-trick in men's T20Is.

27 November 2023
14:30 UTC+2
Scorecard

Nigeria; 99 (19.1 overs)	v	Uganda; 100/1 (17.3 overs)
Sesan Adedeji 23 (29); Dinesh Nakrani 3/21 (4 overs)		Ronak Patel 60* (52); Peter Aho 1/8 (3 overs)

Uganda won by 9 wickets
United Ground, Windhoek
Umpires: Andrew Louw (Nam) and Kehinde Olanbiwonnu (Nga)
Player of the match: Dinesh Nakrani (Uga)

- Nigeria won the toss and elected to bat.

28 November 2023
09:30 UTC+2
Scorecard

Namibia; 157/6 (20 overs)	v	Tanzania; 99/6 (20 overs)
JJ Smit 40* (25); Akhil Anil 2/22 (3 overs)		Amal Rajeevan 41* (45); Gerhard Erasmus 2/17 (4 overs)

Namibia won by 58 runs
Wanderers Cricket Ground, Windhoek
Umpires: Forster Mutizwa (Zim) and Isaac Oyieko (Ken)
Player of the match: JJ Smit (Nam)

- Tanzania won the toss and elected to field.

29 November 2023
09:30 UTC+2
Scorecard

Nigeria; 110/8 (20 overs)	v	Zimbabwe; 111/4 (14 overs)
Ridwan Abdulkareem 24 (32); Sikandar Raza 2/13 (3 overs)		Sikandar Raza 65 (37); Joshua Asia 2/18 (4 overs)

Zimbabwe won by 6 wickets
United Ground, Windhoek
Umpires: Andrew Louw (Nam) and Isaac Oyieko (Ken)
Player of the match: Sikandar Raza (Zim)

- Nigeria won the toss and elected to bat.

29 November 2023
09:30 UTC+2
Scorecard

Tanzania; 153/8 (20 overs)	v	Rwanda; 102/7 (20 overs)
Salum Jumbe 76* (46); Clinton Rubagumya 2/21 (4 overs)		Martin Akayezu 37* (33); Mohammed Issa 2/9 (3 overs)

Tanzania won by 51 runs
Wanderers Cricket Ground, Windhoek
Umpires: Stephen Harris (SA) and Langton Rusere (Zim)
Player of the match: Salum Jumbe (Tan)

- Rwanda won the toss and elected to field.

29 November 2023
14:30 UTC+2
Scorecard

Uganda; 162/5 (20 overs)	v	Kenya; 129 (19 overs)
Simon Ssesazi 60 (50); Sachin Bhudia 1/17 (2 overs)		Collins Obuya 34 (38); Bilal Hassan 4/39 (4 overs)

Uganda won by 33 runs
Wanderers Cricket Ground, Windhoek
Umpires: Forster Mutizwa (Zim) and Kehinde Olanbiwonnu (Nga)
Player of the match: Simon Ssesazi (Uga)

- Uganda won the toss and elected to bat.

30 November 2023
09:30 UTC+2
Scorecard

Zimbabwe; 217/4 (20 overs)	v	Kenya; 107/8 (20 overs)
Sikandar Raza 82 (48); Shem Ngoche 2/30 (3 overs)		Irfan Karim 35* (34); Sean Williams 2/1 (1 over)

Zimbabwe won by 110 runs
United Ground, Windhoek
Umpires: Lubabalo Gcuma (SA) and Stephen Harris (SA)
Player of the match: Sikandar Raza (Zim)

- Kenya won the toss and elected to field.
- Francis Mutua (Ken) made his T20I debut.

30 November 2023
09:30 UTC+2
Scorecard

Rwanda; 65 (18.5 overs)	v	Uganda; 66/1 (8.1 overs)
Eric Dusingizimana 19 (22); Alpesh Ramjani 2/1 (3 overs)		Simon Ssesazi 26* (21); Martin Akayezu 1/19 (2 overs)

Uganda won by 9 wickets
Wanderers Cricket Ground, Windhoek
Umpires: Lauren Agenbag (SA) and Forster Mutizwa (Zim)
Player of the match: Alpesh Ramjani (Uga)

- Uganda won the toss and elected to field.

30 November 2023
14:30 UTC+2
Scorecard

Nigeria; 93 (19.2 overs)	v	Namibia; 96/2 (13.2 overs)
Daniel Ajekun 19 (26); Bernard Scholtz 3/15 (4 overs)		Gerhard Erasmus 48* (40); Prosper Useni 1/10 (2.2 overs)

Namibia won by 8 wickets
Wanderers Cricket Ground, Windhoek
Umpires: Sarah Dambanevana (Zim) and David Odhiambo (Ken)
Player of the match: Gerhard Erasmus (Nam)

- Nigeria won the toss and elected to bat.
