= 2022 Men's T20 World Cup Africa sub-regional qualifiers =

Cricket qualification tournaments

The 2024 ICC Men's T20 World Cup was the ninth edition of the ICC Men's T20 World Cup, a biennial world cup for cricket in Twenty20 International (T20I) format, organized by the International Cricket Council (ICC). The qualification process for the world cup included two stages: direct qualification and regional qualification. The regional qualification for Africa was held in two stages: sub-regional qualifiers and regional final. The Africa region's sub-regional phase consisted of two sub-regional qualifiers, both hosted by Rwanda Cricket Association from 17 November to 9 December 2022.

Mali and Saint Helena both played their first men's T20I matches during qualifier A. Kenya and Rwanda progressed to the regional final after finishing atop the qualifier A's points table. Malawi's Sami Sohail was named player of the series having scored the most runs (241) while Botswana's Dhruv Maisuria took the most wickets (14) in the tournament.

Gambia played their first men's T20I matches during qualifier B. Tanzania and Nigeria progressed to the regional final after finishing atop the qualifier B's points table. Mozambique's Jose Bulele was named player of the series while Ghana's Samson Awiah scored the most runs (227) and Tanzania's Yalinde Nkanya took the most wickets (16) in the tournament.

== Preparation ==
- Seven of the participating teams (Botswana, Cameroon, Ghana, Kenya, Malawi, Mozambique and Tanzania) played in the 2022 ACA Africa T20 Cup finals at Willowmoore Park, Benoni in September.
- Mali selected their players through the 11th edition of their National Championship in September.
- Gambia selected 27 players for national trials out of the best performing players in their eight-team domestic tournament held from May to October.
- Botswana played a five-match bilateral series against a Tuskers-select team from 22 to 27 October in Bulawayo.
- Kenya organized the inaugural Swaminarayan Pro20 tournament from 29 October to 12 November.
- Sierra Leone played six inter-squad trial matches to prepare for the tournament.
- Tanzania hosted a bilateral T20I series against Rwanda from 31 October to 6 November at the Annadil Burhani Ground in Dar es Salaam, which the hosts won 5–0. Saint Helena prepared with a training camp in South Africa ahead of the qualifiers.
- Nigeria played a four-match bilateral series against a Rhinos-select team from 24 to 27 November at Kwekwe Sports Club during a preparation camp in Zimbabwe.

== Qualifier A ==
2022 ICC Men's T20 World Cup Africa sub-regional qualifier A
- Dates: 17 – 25 November 2022
- Administrator(s): International Cricket Council; Africa Cricket Association
- Cricket format: Twenty20 International
- Tournament format: Round-robin
- Host: Rwanda
- Champions: Kenya
- Runners-up: Rwanda
- Participants: 8
- Matches: 28
- Player of the series: (Malawi) Sami Sohail
- Most runs: (Malawi) Sami Sohail (241)
- Most wickets: (Botswana) Dhruv Maisuria (14)

Squads for the qualifier A
Botswana	Kenya	Lesotho	Malawi
Karabo Motlhanka (c, wk); Reginald Nehonde (vc); Vinoo Balakrishnan; Boemo Kgosiemang; Boemo Khumalo; Dhruv Maisuria; Boteng Maphosa; Rod Mbaiwa (wk); Valentine Mbazo (wk); Mmoloki Mooketsi; Tharindu Perera; Katlo Piet; Phemelo Silas; Thatayaone Tshose	Sachin Bhudia (c); Lucas Oluoch (vc); Emmanuel Bundi; Irfan Karim (wk); Peter Langat; Shem Ngoche; Collins Obuya; Nelson Odhiambo; Rakep Patel; Rushab Patel; Vraj Patel; Pushkar Sharma; Tanzeel Sheikh; Sukhdeep Singh	Chachole Tlali (c, wk); Khan Arbaaz; Ts'episo Chaoana; Lerotholi Gabriel; Omar Hussain; Yahya Jakda; Vijayakumar Jayant; Maaz Khan; Mohleki Leoela; Molai Matsau; Ayaj Patel (wk); Samir Patel; Gladwin Thamae; Waseem Yaqoob	Moazzam Baig (c); Mike Choamba; Chisomo Chete (wk); Daniel Jakiel; Donnex Kansonkho; Gift Kansonkho; Lingson Knight; Aaftab Limdawala; Beston Masauko; Gershom Ntambalika; Blessings Pondani; Sami Sohail; Kelvin Thuchila; Phillip Zuze
Mali	Rwanda	Saint Helena	Seychelles
Cheick Keita (c); Lamissa Sanogo (vc); Lassina Berthe; Mohamed Coulibaly; Mahamadou Diaby; Sekou Diaby; Moustapha Diakite; Mamadou Diawara; Sanze Kamate; Theodore Macalou; Zakaria Makadji (wk); Mahamadou Malle; Mamadou Sidibe; Daouda Traore (wk)	Clinton Rubagumya (c); Martin Akayezu; Zappy Bimenyimana; Eric Dusingizimana; Kevin Irakoze; Eric Kubwimana; Oscar Manishimwe (wk); Yvan Mitari; Didier Ndikubwimana (wk); Wilson Niyitanga; Eric Niyomugabo; Ignace Ntirenganya; Emmanuel Sebareme; Orchide Tuyisenge	Scott Crowie (c); Cliff Richards (vc, wk); Jamie Ellick; Rhys Francis; Jordi Henry; Brett Isaac; Gareth Johnson; Alex Langham; Aiden Leo; Branden Leo; Dane Leo; Dax Richards (wk); Barry Stroud; Andrew Yon	Naidoo Krishna (c); Rashen de Silva (vc); Pednekar Abhijit (wk); Hirani Harji; Mazharul Islam; Deso Kalvin; Stephen Madusanka; Shanmugasundram Mohan (wk); Vadodariya Mukesh; Thiwanka Rajapaksha; Sohail Rocket; Samarathunga Rukmal; Tharmenthiran Shanmugam; Sivakumar Udhayan

=== Qualifier A fixtures ===
Pos	Team	Pld	W	L	NR	Pts	NRR	Qualification
1	Kenya	7	5	0	2	12	5.699	Advanced to the regional final
2	Rwanda	7	5	1	1	11	2.466	Advanced to the regional final
3	Malawi	7	4	1	2	10	2.026	
4	Botswana	7	3	3	1	7	1.167	
5	Saint Helena	7	2	3	2	6	−0.976	
6	Lesotho	7	2	4	1	5	−3.497	
7	Seychelles	7	0	4	3	3	−1.639	
8	Mali	7	0	5	2	2	−4.954	

Source: ESPNcricinfo

17 November 2022
09:30
Scorecard

Botswana; 106 (20 overs)	v	Rwanda; 108/5 (17.2 overs)
Tharindu Perera 28 (27); Martin Akayezu 4/16 (4 overs)		Eric Dusingizimana 33 (32); Dhruv Maisuria 2/7 (4 overs)

Rwanda won by 5 wickets
Gahanga International Cricket Stadium, Kigali
Umpires: Langton Rusere (Zim) and Brad White (SA)
Player of the match: Martin Akayezu (Rwa)

- Rwanda won the toss and elected to field.

17 November 2022
09:30
Scorecard

Lesotho; 138/6 (20 overs)	v	Mali; 107 (17.5 overs)
Lerotholi Gabriel 45* (37); Theodore Macalou 2/13 (3 overs)		Cheick Keita 35 (28); Waseem Yaqoob 2/7 (3 overs)

Lesotho won by 31 runs
IPRC Cricket Ground, Kigali
Umpires: Rockie D'Mello (Ken) and Isaac Oyieko (Ken)
Player of the match: Lerotholi Gabriel (Les)

- Mali won the toss and elected to field.
- Mali played their first men's T20I match.
- Khan Arbaaz, Lerotholi Gabriel, Waseem Yaqoob (Les), Mohamed Coulibaly, Mahamadou Diaby, Sekou Diaby, Moustapha Diakite, Mamadou Diawara, Sanze Kamate, Cheick Keita, Theodore Macalou, Lamissa Sanogo, Mamadou Sidibe and Daouda Traore (Mli) all made their T20I debuts.

17 November 2022
13:45
Scorecard

Kenya; 48/0 (4 overs)	v	Saint Helena
Collins Obuya 32* (13)

No result
Gahanga International Cricket Stadium, Kigali
Umpires: Patric Makumbi (Uga) and John Mayeku (Uga)

- Saint Helena won the toss and elected to field.
- No further play was possible due to rain.
- Saint Helena played their first men's T20I match.
- Pushkar Sharma, Tanzeel Sheikh (Ken), Scott Crowie, Jamie Ellick, Rhys Francis, Jordi Henry, Brett Isaac, Gareth Johnson, Alex Langham, Aiden Leo, Cliff Richards, Barry Stroud and Andrew Yon (Shn) all made their T20I debuts.

17 November 2022
13:45
Scorecard

Botswana; 115/2 (15 overs)	v	Seychelles
Karabo Motlhanka 39 (32); Naidoo Krishna 1/16 (3 overs)

No result
IPRC Cricket Ground, Kigali
Umpires: David Odhiambo (Ken) and Allahudien Paleker (SA)

- Seychelles won the toss and elected to field.
- No further play was possible due to rain.
- Katlo Piet (Bot), Rashen de Silva, Thiwanka Rajapaksha, Samarathunga Rukmal and Tharmenthiran Shanmugam (Sey) all made their T20I debuts.

18 November 2022
09:30
Scorecard

Rwanda; 130/8 (20 overs)	v	Saint Helena; 76/8 (20 overs)
Eric Dusingizimana 52 (43); Andrew Yon 4/30 (4 overs)		Aiden Leo 24 (33); Emmanuel Sebareme 3/15 (4 overs)

Rwanda won by 54 runs
Gahanga International Cricket Stadium, Kigali
Umpires: Rockie D'Mello (Ken) and John Mayeku (Uga)
Player of the match: Emmanuel Sebareme (Rwa)

- Rwanda won the toss and elected to bat.

18 November 2022
09:30
Scorecard

Lesotho; 91 (12.4 overs)	v	Botswana; 97/0 (7.5 overs)
Lerotholi Gabriel 23 (14); Dhruv Maisuria 5/30 (3.4 overs)		Karabo Motlhanka 54* (23)

Botswana won by 10 wickets
IPRC Cricket Ground, Kigali
Umpires: Isaac Oyieko (Ken) and Brad White (SA)
Player of the match: Dhruv Maisuria (Bot)

- Botswana won the toss and elected to field.
- Boemo Kgosiemang (Bot) and Vijayakumar Jayant (Les) both made their T20I debuts.

18 November 2022
13:45
Scorecard

Kenya; 209/6 (20 overs)	v	Malawi; 11/0 (3.1 overs)
Collins Obuya 44 (16); Sami Sohail 2/20 (4 overs)		Donnex Kansonkho 7* (13)

No result
Gahanga International Cricket Stadium, Kigali
Umpires: Patric Makumbi (Uga) and Langton Rusere (Zim)

- Kenya won the toss and elected to bat.
- No further play was possible due to rain.
- Beston Masauko (Mwi) made his T20I debut.

18 November 2022
13:45
Scorecard

Seychelles; 162/3 (20 overs)	v	Mali; 14/2 (4.1 overs)
Thiwanka Rajapaksha 49 (49); Mamadou Diawara 2/40 (4 overs)		Mahamadou Diaby 9 (16); Naidoo Krishna 1/0 (0.1 overs)

No result
IPRC Cricket Ground, Kigali
Umpires: Itangishaka Olivier (Rwa) and Allahudien Paleker (SA)

- Mali won the toss and elected to field.
- No further play was possible due to rain.
- Lassina Berthe and Mahamadou Malle (Mli) both made their T20I debuts.

20 November 2022
09:30
Scorecard

Botswana; 143/8 (20 overs)	v	Malawi; 144/6 (19.5 overs)
Karabo Motlhanka 48 (41); Daniel Jakiel 2/24 (4 overs)		Sami Sohail 84* (55); Mmoloki Mooketsi 3/16 (4 overs)

Malawi won by 4 wickets
Gahanga International Cricket Stadium, Kigali
Umpires: David Odhiambo (Ken) and Langton Rusere (Zim)
Player of the match: Sami Sohail (Mwi)

- Botswana won the toss and elected to bat.

20 November 2022
09:30
Scorecard

Mali; 30 (10.4 overs)	v	Kenya; 34/0 (2.3 overs)
Theodore Macalou 12 (20); Peter Langat 6/17 (4 overs)		Collins Obuya 18* (6)

Kenya won by 10 wickets
IPRC Cricket Ground, Kigali
Umpires: John Mayeku (Uga) and Allahudien Paleker (SA)
Player of the match: Peter Langat (Ken)

- Mali won the toss and elected to bat.
- Peter Langat (Ken) took his first five-wicket haul in T20Is.

20 November 2022
13:45
Scorecard

Rwanda; 87/9 (20 overs)	v	Kenya; 90/1 (10.4 overs)
Wilson Niyitanga 17 (26); Shem Ngoche 3/16 (4 overs)		Rushab Patel 45 (32); Emmanuel Sebareme 1/7 (2 overs)

Kenya won by 9 wickets
Gahanga International Cricket Stadium, Kigali
Umpires: Patric Makumbi (Uga) and Brad White (SA)
Player of the match: Shem Ngoche (Ken)

- Kenya won the toss and elected to field.

20 November 2022
13:45
Scorecard

Seychelles; 152/5 (20 overs)	v	Lesotho; 153/3 (18.2 overs)
Mazharul Islam 46 (37); Yahya Jakda 3/32 (4 overs)		Maaz Khan 68* (35); Sohail Rocket 2/23 (4 overs)

Lesotho won by 7 wickets
IPRC Cricket Ground, Kigali
Umpires: Rockie D'Mello (Ken) and Itangishaka Olivier (Rwa)
Player of the match: Maaz Khan (Les)

- Seychelles won the toss and elected to bat.

21 November 2022
09:30
Scorecard

Malawi; 165/4 (20 overs)	v	Mali; 91/9 (20 overs)
Gift Kansonkho 52 (59); Mahamadou Diaby 2/19 (3 overs)		Sekou Diaby 41* (29); Moazzam Baig 3/14 (4 overs)

Malawi won by 74 runs
Gahanga International Cricket Stadium, Kigali
Umpires: Itangishaka Olivier (Rwa) and Isaac Oyieko (Ken)
Player of the match: Gift Kansonkho (Mwi)

- Mali won the toss and elected to field.
- Zakaria Makadji (Mli) made his T20I debut.

21 November 2022
09:30
Scorecard

Kenya; 237/5 (20 overs)	v	Lesotho; 70 (15.2 overs)
Nelson Odhiambo 67 (29); Molai Matsau 2/43 (4 overs)		Waseem Yaqoob 27 (30); Shem Ngoche 3/16 (3 overs)

Kenya won by 167 runs
IPRC Cricket Ground, Kigali
Umpires: Patric Makumbi (Uga) and Allahudien Paleker (SA)
Player of the match: Rushab Patel (Ken)

- Kenya won the toss and elected to bat.

21 November 2022
13:45
Scorecard

Rwanda; 159 (20 overs)	v	Malawi; 97/8 (16.5 overs)
Wilson Niyitanga 46 (32); Aaftab Limdawala 2/26 (4 overs)		Moazzam Baig 32 (24); Clinton Rubagumya 2/11 (3 overs)

Rwanda won by 41 runs (DLS method)
Gahanga International Cricket Stadium, Kigali
Umpires: Rockie D'Mello (Ken) and Langton Rusere (Zim)
Player of the match: Wilson Niyitanga (Rwa)

- Rwanda won the toss and elected to bat.
- No further play was possible due to rain.

21 November 2022
13:45
Scorecard

Saint Helena; 125/6 (20 overs)	v	Seychelles; 123 (19.5 overs)
Scott Crowie 28 (29); Samarathunga Rukmal 2/18 (4 overs)		Stephen Madusanka 50* (47); Scott Crowie 3/21 (3.5 overs)

Saint Helena won by 2 runs
IPRC Cricket Ground, Kigali
Umpires: John Mayeku (Uga) and David Odhiambo (Ken)
Player of the match: Scott Crowie (Shn)

- Seychelles won the toss and elected to field.
- Dax Richards (Shn) made his T20I debut.

22 November 2022
09:30
Scorecard

Mali; 37 (11 overs)	v	Botswana; 38/5 (5.2 overs)
Mahamadou Diaby 11 (10); Dhruv Maisuria 3/10 (3 overs)		Tharindu Perera 11* (8); Theodore Macalou 3/19 (2.2 overs)

Botswana won by 5 wickets
Gahanga International Cricket Stadium, Kigali
Umpires: Rockie D'Mello (Ken) and Patric Makumbi (Uga)
Player of the match: Dhruv Maisuria (Bot)

- Botswana won the toss and elected to field.
- The match was reduced to 13 overs per side due to rain.
- Rod Mbaiwa (Bot) made his T20I debut.

22 November 2022
09:30
Scorecard

Saint Helena; 126/6 (15 overs)	v	Lesotho; 81 (13.3 overs)
Andrew Yon 58 (36); Yahya Jakda 2/20 (3 overs); Waseem Yaqoob 2/20 (3 overs)		Waseem Yaqoob 31 (36); Andrew Yon 5/10 (3 overs)

Saint Helena won by 45 runs
IPRC Cricket Ground, Kigali
Umpires: Isaac Oyieko (Ken) and Allahudien Paleker (SA)
Player of the match: Andrew Yon (Shn)

- Lesotho won the toss and elected to field.
- The match was reduced to 15 overs per side due to rain.
- Andrew Yon became the first player for Saint Helena to take a five-wicket haul in men's T20Is.

22 November 2022
13:45
Scorecard

Seychelles; 42/1 (5 overs)	v	Malawi
Mazharul Islam 22* (18); Sami Sohail 1/5 (1 over)

No result
Gahanga International Cricket Stadium, Kigali
Umpires: David Odhiambo (Ken) and Brad White (SA)

- Malawi won the toss and elected to field.
- No further play was possible due to rain.
- Pednekar Abhijit (Sey) made his T20I debut.

22 November 2022
13:45
Scorecard

Mali	v	Saint Helena

No result
IPRC Cricket Ground, Kigali
Umpires: Itangishaka Olivier (Rwa) and Langton Rusere (Zim)

- Mali won the toss and elected to bat.
- No play was possible due to rain.

24 November 2022
09:30
Scorecard

Saint Helena; 37/6 (5 overs)	v	Malawi; 39/0 (3.4 overs)
Jordi Henry 17 (10); Sami Sohail 3/18 (2 overs)		Sami Sohail 23* (15)

Malawi won by 10 wickets
Gahanga International Cricket Stadium, Kigali
Umpires: Itangishaka Olivier (Rwa) and Brad White (SA)
Player of the match: Sami Sohail (Mwi)

- Malawi won the toss and elected to field.
- The match was reduced to 5 overs per side due to rain.

24 November 2022
09:30
Scorecard

Rwanda; 122/4 (13 overs)	v	Seychelles; 47/8 (13 overs)
Eric Dusingizimana 66* (41); Naidoo Krishna 2/17 (2 overs)		Stephen Madusanka 15* (22); Emmanuel Sebareme 3/12 (3 overs)

Rwanda won by 75 runs
IPRC Cricket Ground, Kigali
Umpires: David Odhiambo (Ken) and Isaac Oyieko (Ken)
Player of the match: Eric Dusingizimana (Rwa)

- Rwanda won the toss and elected to bat.
- The match was reduced to 13 overs per side due to rain.

24 November 2022
13:45
Scorecard

Botswana; 116/6 (20 overs)	v	Kenya; 122/2 (11.3 overs)
Reginald Nehonde 53 (54); Peter Langat 2/22 (3 overs)		Collins Obuya 74 (39); Thatayaone Tshose 2/26 (3 overs)

Kenya won by 8 wickets
Gahanga International Cricket Stadium, Kigali
Umpires: John Mayeku (Uga) and Langton Rusere (Zim)
Player of the match: Collins Obuya (Ken)

- Botswana won the toss and elected to bat.

24 November 2022
13:45
Scorecard

Mali; 30 (12.3 overs)	v	Rwanda; 34/0 (2.3 overs)
Moustapha Diakite 8 (8); Kevin Irakoze 3/4 (4 overs)		Orchide Tuyisenge 18* (9)

Rwanda won by 10 wickets
IPRC Cricket Ground, Kigali
Umpires: Rockie D'Mello (Ken) and Allahudien Paleker (SA)
Player of the match: Kevin Irakoze (Rwa)

- Rwanda won the toss and elected to field.

25 November 2022
09:30
Scorecard

Botswana; 165/2 (20 overs)	v	Saint Helena; 105 (19.1 overs)
Vinoo Balakrishnan 100 (70); Aiden Leo 1/21 (3 overs)		Brett Isaac 34 (49); Dhruv Maisuria 4/25 (4 overs)

Botswana won by 60 runs
Gahanga International Cricket Stadium, Kigali
Umpires: Patric Makumbi (Uga) and David Odhiambo (Ken)
Player of the match: Vinoo Balakrishnan (Bot)

- Botswana won the toss and elected to bat.
- Vinoo Balakrishnan became the first player for Botswana to score a century in men's T20Is.

25 November 2022
09:30
Scorecard

Malawi; 185/2 (20 overs)	v	Lesotho; 67 (16 overs)
Sami Sohail 94* (60); Gladwin Thamae 1/28 (3 overs)		Vijayakumar Jayant 31 (39); Daniel Jakiel 5/11 (4 overs)

Malawi won by 118 runs
IPRC Cricket Ground, Kigali
Umpires: Itangishaka Olivier (Rwa) and Langton Rusere (Zim)
Player of the match: Sami Sohail (Mwi)

- Malawi won the toss and elected to bat.
- Daniel Jakiel (Mwi) took his first five-wicket haul in T20Is.

25 November 2022
13:45
Scorecard

Seychelles; 94/8 (20 overs)	v	Kenya; 82/3 (13.5 overs)
Mazharul Islam 50 (48); Peter Langat 3/14 (4 overs)		Pushkar Sharma 33 (23); Stephen Madusanka 3/16 (4 overs)

Kenya won by 7 wickets (DLS method)
Gahanga International Cricket Stadium, Kigali
Umpires: John Mayeku (Uga) and Brad White (SA)
Player of the match: Peter Langat (Ken)

- Seychelles won the toss and elected to bat.
- Kenya were set a revised target of 82 runs in 17 overs due to rain.

25 November 2022
13:45
Scorecard

Rwanda; 192/6 (20 overs)	v	Lesotho
Eric Dusingizimana 49 (37); Waseem Yaqoob 3/40 (3 overs)

No result
IPRC Cricket Ground, Kigali
Umpires: Isaac Oyieko (Ken) and Allahudien Paleker (SA)

- Rwanda won the toss and elected to bat.
- No further play was possible due to rain.

== Qualifier B ==
2022 ICC Men's T20 World Cup Africa sub-regional qualifier B
- Dates: 1 – 9 December 2022
- Administrator(s): International Cricket Council; Africa Cricket Association
- Cricket format: Twenty20 International
- Tournament format: Round-robin
- Host: Rwanda
- Champions: Tanzania
- Runners-up: Nigeria
- Participants: 8
- Matches: 28
- Player of the series: (Mozambique) Jose Bulele
- Most runs: (Ghana) Samson Awiah (227)
- Most wickets: (Tanzania) Yalinde Nkanya (16)

Squads for the qualifier B
Cameroon	Eswatini	Gambia	Ghana
Julien Abega (c); Protais Abanda; Roland Amah; Abdoulaye Aminou (wk); Roger Atangana; Alexis Balla; Kulbhushan Jadhav; Dipita Loic; Appolinaire Mengoumou; Faustin Mpegna; Narcisse Ndouteng; Charles Ondoa (wk); Idriss Tchakou (wk); Alain Toube (wk); Bruno Toube	Melusi Magagula (c); Tarun Sandeep (vc, wk); Mohammed Alamgir; Adil Butt; Loyiso Dlamini; Wandile Dlamini; Christiaan Forbes; Naeem Gull; Mancoba Jele; Eric Phiri; Dinesh Polpitiya; Umair Qasim; Haris Rashid; Phumlani Sibiya (wk)	Peter Campbell (c, wk); Ousman Bah (wk); Modou Bojang; Frank Campbell; Aniru Conteh; Andre Jarju; Musa Jobarteh; Abubacarr Kuyateh; Muhammed Manga; Gabriel Riley; Mustapha Suwareh; Ismaila Tamba; Fallou Thorpe; Ousman Touray	Obed Harvey (c); Samson Awiah (vc); Paul Ayoleyine; Daniel Anefie; Richmond Baaleri; Kofi Bagabena; Godfred Bakiweyem; Rexford Bakum; Alex Osei; Amoluk Singh; Devender Singh; Aziz Sualley; Joseph Theodore (wk); James Vifah
Mozambique	Nigeria	Sierra Leone	Tanzania
Filipe Cossa (c); Manussur Algi; Jose Bulele; Frederico Carava; Armando Chuvale; Francisco Couana; Last Emilio (wk); Gomes Gomes; Joao Hou; Jose Joao; Dario Macome; Zefanias Matsinhe; Luis Mavume; Agostinho Navicha; Camate Roposo; Lourenco Salomone; Lourenco Simango	Sylvester Okpe (c); Ridwan Abdulkareem; Sesan Adedeji; Peter Aho; Joshua Asia; Akhere Isesele; Isaac Okpe; Ademola Onikoyi; Chimezie Onwuzulike; Sulaimon Runsewe; Ashmit Shreshta (wk); Mohameed Taiwo; Chiemelie Udekwe; Prosper Useni	George Edward Ngegba (c); Chernoh Bah; John Bangura (wk); Raymond Coker (wk); Samuel Conteh; Edmond Ernest; Abass Gbla; Yegbeh Jalloh (wk); Ibrahim Kamara; Zahid Khan; Miniru Kpaka; Lansana Lamin; George Sesay; Mohammad Shamshad Khan; Alusine Turay; Solomon Williams	Abhik Patwa (c); Akhil Anil; Harsheed Chohan; Mohamed Issa; Salum Jumbe; Ally Kimote; Omary Kitunda (wk); Kassim Nassoro; Yalinde Nkanya; Johnson Nyambo; Amal Rajeevan (wk); Ivan Selemani; Jitin Singh; SanjayKumar Thakor

=== Qualifier B fixtures ===
Pos	Team	Pld	W	L	NR	Pts	NRR	Qualification
1	Tanzania	7	6	0	1	13	4.891	Advanced to the regional final
2	Nigeria	7	6	0	1	13	3.739	Advanced to the regional final
3	Mozambique	7	5	2	0	10	0.684	
4	Sierra Leone	7	4	3	0	8	−0.039	
5	Ghana	7	3	4	0	6	1.446	
6	Eswatini	7	1	5	1	3	−2.067	
7	Gambia	7	1	6	0	2	−3.865	
8	Cameroon	7	0	6	1	1	−3.872	

Source: ESPNcricinfo

----

1 December 2022
09:30
Scorecard

Sierra Leone; 57 (11.3 overs)	v	Tanzania; 47/1 (7.3 overs)
George Edward Ngegba 29 (27); Yalinde Nkanya 4/1 (1.3 overs)		Amal Rajeevan 26* (22); George Sesay 1/8 (2 overs)

Tanzania won by 9 wickets (DLS method)
Gahanga International Cricket Stadium, Kigali
Umpires: Lauren Agenbag (SA) and Habib Enesi (Nga)
Player of the match: Harsheed Chohan (Tan)

- Tanzania won the toss and elected to field.
- Tanzania were set a revised target of 47 runs in 15 overs due to rain.
- Raymond Coker, Mohammad Shamshad Khan and George Ngegba (Sle) all made their T20I debuts.
- Harsheed Chohan became the first bowler for Tanzania to take a hat-trick in men's T20Is.

1 December 2022
09:30
Scorecard

Ghana; 176/5 (20 overs)	v	Eswatini; 151/5 (20 overs)
James Vifah 63 (55); Melusi Magagula 2/29 (3 overs)		Adil Butt 53 (34); Kofi Bagabena 1/12 (2 overs)

Ghana won by 25 runs
IPRC Cricket Ground, Kigali
Umpires: Stephen Harris (SA) and Christopher Phiri (Zim)
Player of the match: James Vifah (Gha)

- Eswatini won the toss and elected to field.
- Adil Butt, Dinesh Polpitiya, Tarun Sandeep and Phumlani Sibiya (Esw) all made their T20I debuts.

1 December 2022
13:45
Scorecard

Mozambique; 86/8 (20 overs)	v	Nigeria; 87/2 (13.5 overs)
Filipe Cossa 22* (21); Peter Aho 2/10 (4 overs)		Ademola Onikoyi 38* (47); Camate Roposo 1/3 (0.5 overs)

Nigeria won by 8 wickets
Gahanga International Cricket Stadium, Kigali
Umpires: Simon Kintu (Uga) and Forster Mutizwa (Zim)
Player of the match: Ademola Onikoyi (Nga)

- Nigeria won the toss and elected to field.
- Armando Chuvale, Dario Macome, Camate Roposo (Moz), Akhere Isesele and Chiemelie Udekwe (Nga) all made their T20I debuts.

1 December 2022
13:45
Scorecard

Gambia; 122 (20 overs)	v	Eswatini; 123/5 (17.2 overs)
Ismaila Tamba 43 (27); Dinesh Polpitiya 3/15 (3 overs)		Tarun Sandeep 62* (53); Aniru Conteh 2/26 (4 overs)

Eswatini won by 5 wickets
IPRC Cricket Ground, Kigali
Umpires: Gasana Christian (Rwa) and Bongani Jele (SA)
Player of the match: Tarun Sandeep (Esw)

- Eswatini won the toss and elected to field.
- Gambia played their first men's T20I match.
- Mohammed Alamgir (Esw), Ousman Bah, Modou Bojang, Frank Campbell, Peter Campbell, Aniru Conteh, Andre Jarju, Musa Jobarteh, Muhammed Manga, Gabriel Riley, Mustapha Suwareh and Ismaila Tamba (Gam) all made their T20I debuts.

2 December 2022
09:30
Scorecard

Sierra Leone; 62 (19.1 overs)	v	Nigeria; 63/4 (12.3 overs)
Lansana Lamin 34* (51); Peter Aho 3/18 (4 overs)		Ashmit Shreshta 27 (34); George Ngegba 2/9 (2 overs)

Nigeria won by 6 wickets
Gahanga International Cricket Stadium, Kigali
Umpires: Lauren Agenbag (SA) and Christopher Phiri (Zim)
Player of the match: Peter Aho (Nga)

- Nigeria won the toss and elected to field.
- Ibrahim Kamara (Sle) made his T20I debut.

2 December 2022
09:30
Scorecard

Ghana; 111 (18.2 overs)	v	Mozambique; 115/3 (19 overs)
Rexford Bakum 28 (27); Camate Roposo 3/15 (4 overs)		Francisco Couana 65 (52); Rexford Bakum 3/29 (4 overs)

Mozambique won by 7 wickets
IPRC Cricket Ground, Kigali
Umpires: Rockie D'Mello (Ken) and Forster Mutizwa (Zim)
Player of the match: Francisco Couana (Moz)

- Mozambique won the toss and elected to field.

2 December 2022
13:45
Scorecard

Cameroon; 146/8 (20 overs)	v	Sierra Leone; 150/9 (19.2 overs)
Bruno Toube 49 (33); Alusine Turay 2/24 (4 overs)		John Bangura 34* (28); Alain Toube 3/20 (4 overs)

Sierra Leone won by 1 wicket
Gahanga International Cricket Stadium, Kigali
Umpires: Gasana Christian (Rwa) and Stephen Harris (SA)
Player of the match: Alusine Turay (Sle)

- Sierra Leone won the toss and elected to field.
- Alusine Turay (Sle) made his T20I debut.

2 December 2022
13:45
Scorecard

Eswatini; 150/5 (20 overs)	v	Mozambique; 151/1 (17.3 overs)
Naeem Gull 63* (49); Camate Roposo 2/30 (4 overs)		Francisco Couana 67 (46); Melusi Magagula 1/34 (3 overs)

Mozambique won by 9 wickets
IPRC Cricket Ground, Kigali
Umpires: Bongani Jele (SA) and Simon Kintu (Uga)
Player of the match: Francisco Couana (Moz)

- Mozambique won the toss and elected to field.

4 December 2022
09:30
Scorecard

Cameroon; 95 (16.5 overs)	v	Mozambique; 98/1 (11 overs)
Alain Toube 19 (19); Camate Raposo 3/19 (4 overs)		Jose Bulele 40* (37); Dipita Loic 1/15 (2 overs)

Mozambique won by 9 wickets
Gahanga International Cricket Stadium, Kigali
Umpires: Gasana Christian (Rwa) and Christopher Phiri (Zim)
Player of the match: Jose Bulele (Moz)

- Mozambique won the toss and elected to field.
- Roger Atangana (Cmr) and Luis Mavume (Moz) both made their T20I debuts.

4 December 2022
09:30
Scorecard

Nigeria; 221/7 (20 overs)	v	Eswatini; 103/9 (20 overs)
Ashmit Shreshta 76 (49); Melusi Magagula 3/62 (4 overs)		Adil Butt 50 (39); Ridwan Abdulkareem 3/8 (3 overs)

Nigeria won by 118 runs
IPRC Cricket Ground, Kigali
Umpires: Lauren Agenbag (SA) and Simon Kintu (Uga)
Player of the match: Ashmit Shreshta (Nga)

- Eswatini won the toss and elected to field.

4 December 2022
13:45
Scorecard

Ghana; 121/7 (20 overs)	v	Tanzania; 122/6 (14.3 overs)
Daniel Anefie 46 (26); SanjayKumar Thakor 3/11 (4 overs)		Ivan Selemani 56 (21); Richmond Baaleri 4/12 (4 overs)

Tanzania won by 4 wickets
Gahanga International Cricket Stadium, Kigali
Umpires: Habib Enesi (Nga) and Stephen Harris (SA)
Player of the match: Ivan Selemani (Tan)

- Tanzania won the toss and elected to field.
- Alex Osei (Gha) made his T20I debut.

4 December 2022
13:45
Scorecard

Gambia; 42 (14.5 overs)	v	Nigeria; 43/1 (5.1 overs)
Aniru Conteh 9 (21); Ridwan Abdulkareem 3/6 (2 overs)		Sulaimon Runsewe 30* (21); Aniru Conteh 1/9 (1.1 overs)

Nigeria won by 9 wickets
IPRC Cricket Ground, Kigali
Umpires: Rockie D'Mello (Ken) and Forster Mutizwa (Zim)
Player of the match: Sulaimon Runsewe (Nga)

- Nigeria won the toss and elected to field.
- Abubacarr Kuyateh (Gam) made his T20I debut.

5 December 2022
09:30
Scorecard

Mozambique; 81/3 (13 overs)	v	Tanzania; 82/4 (11.3 overs)
Joao Hou 23* (16); Yalinde Nkanya 2/20 (3 overs)		Kassim Nassoro 26* (27); Lourenco Simango 2/11 (3 overs)

Tanzania won by 6 wickets
Gahanga International Cricket Stadium, Kigali
Umpires: Rockie D'Mello (Ken) and Simon Kintu (Uga)
Player of the match: Kassim Nassoro (Tan)

- Tanzania won the toss and elected to field.
- The match was reduced to 13 overs per side due to rain.

5 December 2022
09:30
Scorecard

Sierra Leone; 52/4 (5 overs)	v	Eswatini; 48/4 (5 overs)
Lansana Lamin 17* (9); Haris Rashid 1/13 (1 over)		Adil Butt 22 (9); Mohammad Shamshad Khan 2/4 (1 over)

Sierra Leone won by 4 runs
IPRC Cricket Ground, Kigali
Umpires: Lauren Agenbag (SA) and Christopher Phiri (Zim)
Player of the match: Lansana Lamin (Sle)

- Eswatini won the toss and elected to field.
- The match was reduced to 5 overs per side due to rain.

5 December 2022
13:45
Scorecard

Cameroon; 72 (19.5 overs)	v	Nigeria; 31/0 (5 overs)
Bruno Toube 20 (28); Sylvester Okpe 5/9 (4 overs)		Sulaimon Runsewe 16* (17)

Nigeria won by 17 runs (DLS method)
Gahanga International Cricket Stadium, Kigali
Umpires: Gasana Christian (Rwa) and Forster Mutizwa (Zim)
Player of the match: Sylvester Okpe (Nga)

- Nigeria won the toss and elected to field.
- No further play was possible due to rain.
- Joshua Asia (Nga) made his T20I debut.
- Sylvester Okpe (Nga) took his first five-wicket haul in T20Is.

5 December 2022
13:45
Scorecard

Ghana; 135/7 (20 overs)	v	Sierra Leone; 61/1 (7.2 overs)
James Vifah 63* (53); Abass Gbla 4/9 (2 overs)		Alusine Turay 26* (18); Kofi Bagabena 1/10 (2 overs)

Sierra Leone won by 18 runs (DLS method)
IPRC Cricket Ground, Kigali
Umpires: Habib Enesi (Nga) and Bongani Jele (SA)
Player of the match: Abass Gbla (Sle)

- Sierra Leone won the toss and elected to field.
- No further play was possible due to rain.
- Paul Ayoleyine (Gha) made his T20I debut.

6 December 2022
09:30
Scorecard

Tanzania; 186/8 (20 overs)	v	Eswatini; 120/8 (20 overs)
Abhik Patwa 79 (47); Umair Qasim 3/24 (4 overs)		Tarun Sandeep 33 (24); Akhil Anil 3/17 (4 overs)

Tanzania won by 66 runs
Gahanga International Cricket Stadium, Kigali
Umpires: Stephen Harris (SA) and Simon Kintu (Uga)
Player of the match: Abhik Patwa (Tan)

- Eswatini won the toss and elected to field.

6 December 2022
09:30
Scorecard

Gambia; 81/9 (20 overs)	v	Sierra Leone; 84/2 (10 overs)
Muhammed Manga 31 (41); George Ngegba 3/16 (4 overs)		Lansana Lamin 36* (21); Modou Bojang 1/2 (1 over)

Sierra Leone won by 8 wickets
IPRC Cricket Ground, Kigali
Umpires: Lauren Agenbag (SA) and Bongani Jele (SA)
Player of the match: George Ngegba (Sle)

- Sierra Leone won the toss and elected to field.
- Fallou Thorpe (Gam) made his T20I debut.

6 December 2022
13:45
Scorecard

Gambia; 59 (17.2 overs)	v	Tanzania; 61/0 (4.4 overs)
Ismaila Tamba 22* (26); Yalinde Nkanya 3/7 (4 overs)		Ivan Selemani 33* (15)

Tanzania won by 10 wickets
Gahanga International Cricket Stadium, Kigali
Umpires: Rockie D'Mello (Ken) and Christopher Phiri (Zim)
Player of the match: Yalinde Nkanya (Tan)

- Tanzania won the toss and elected to field.
- Ousman Touray (Gam) and Johnson Nyambo (Tan) both made their T20I debuts.

6 December 2022
13:45
Scorecard

Ghana; 183/3 (20 overs)	v	Cameroon; 76 (13.2 overs)
Samson Awiah 96* (69); Julien Abega 1/31 (4 overs)		Bruno Toube 38 (28); Kofi Bagabena 4/19 (4 overs)

Ghana won by 107 runs
IPRC Cricket Ground, Kigali
Umpires: Gasana Christian (Rwa) and Habib Enesi (Nga)
Player of the match: Samson Awiah (Gha)

- Cameroon won the toss and elected to field.

8 December 2022
09:30
Scorecard

Ghana; 215/3 (20 overs)	v	Gambia; 69 (14.1 overs)
Obed Harvey 107* (54); Modou Bojang 1/24 (3 overs)		Frank Campbell 18 (23); Richmond Baaleri 5/29 (4 overs)

Ghana won by 138 runs (DLS method)
Gahanga International Cricket Stadium, Kigali
Umpires: Lauren Agenbag (SA) and Habib Enesi (Nga)
Player of the match: Obed Harvey (Gha)

- Ghana won the toss and elected to bat.
- Gambia were set a revised target of 208 runs in 18 overs due to rain.
- Obed Harvey became the first player for Ghana to score a century in men's T20Is.
- Richmond Baaleri (Gha) took his first five-wicket haul in T20Is.

8 December 2022
09:30
Scorecard

Eswatini; 112/6 (13 overs)	v	Cameroon
Tarun Sandeep 34* (34); Alain Toube 4/13 (3 overs)

No result
IPRC Cricket Ground, Kigali
Umpires: Gasana Christian (Rwa) and Stephen Harris (SA)

- Eswatini won the toss and elected to bat.
- The match was reduced to 13 overs per side due to fog. No further play was possible due to rain.

8 December 2022
13:45
Scorecard

Nigeria; 101 (19.4 overs)	v	Tanzania; 19/3 (4.3 overs)
Sulaimon Runsewe 39 (33); Ally Kimote 4/21 (3.4 overs)		Amal Rajeevan 10* (11); Prosper Useni 1/3 (2 overs)

No result
Gahanga International Cricket Stadium, Kigali
Umpires: Forster Mutizwa (Zim) and Christopher Phiri (Zim)

- Tanzania won the toss and elected to field.
- No further play was possible due to rain.

8 December 2022
13:45
Scorecard

Mozambique; 127/5 (20 overs)	v	Gambia; 70 (11 overs)
Jose Bulele 50 (50); Ismaila Tamba 2/20 (3 overs)		Frank Campbell 12 (17); Joao Hou 3/2 (1 over)

Mozambique won by 40 runs (DLS method)
IPRC Cricket Ground, Kigali
Umpires: Rockie D'Mello (Ken) and Simon Kintu (Uga)
Player of the match: Jose Bulele (Moz)

- Mozambique won the toss and elected to bat.
- Gambia were set a revised target of 111 runs in 16 overs due to rain.

9 December 2022
09:30
Scorecard

Sierra Leone; 116/9 (20 overs)	v	Mozambique; 117/5 (19.2 overs)
John Bangura 32 (59); Francisco Couana 3/19 (3 overs)		Francisco Couana 32 (36); Abass Gbla 1/16 (2.2 overs)

Mozambique won by 5 wickets
Gahanga International Cricket Stadium, Kigali
Umpires: Gasana Christian (Rwa) and Rockie D'Mello (Ken)
Player of the match: Francisco Couana (Moz)

- Mozambique won the toss and elected to field.

9 December 2022
09:30
Scorecard

Gambia; 115/8 (20 overs)	v	Cameroon; 104 (17.5 overs)
Muhammed Manga 59* (57); Julien Abega 4/18 (4 overs)		Abdoulaye Aminou 19 (5); Aniru Conteh 4/10 (4 overs)

Gambia won by 11 runs
IPRC Cricket Ground, Kigali
Umpires: Stephen Harris (SA) and Simon Kintu (Uga)
Player of the match: Muhammed Manga (Gam)

- Gambia won the toss and elected to bat.

9 December 2022
13:45
Scorecard

Ghana; 127/7 (20 overs)	v	Nigeria; 131/4 (16.4 overs)
Rexford Bakum 41 (27); Peter Aho 4/15 (4 overs)		Ashmit Shreshta 47* (44); Daniel Anefie 1/16 (2 overs)

Nigeria won by 6 wickets
Gahanga International Cricket Stadium, Kigali
Umpires: Lauren Agenbag (SA) and Forster Mutizwa (Zim)
Player of the match: Peter Aho (Nga)

- Ghana won the toss and elected to bat.

9 December 2022
13:45
Scorecard

Tanzania; 218/6 (20 overs)	v	Cameroon; 34 (12.3 overs)
Ivan Selemani 71 (40); Bruno Toube 2/37 (4 overs)		Roland Amah 20 (16); Yalinde Nkanya 5/2 (4 overs)

Tanzania won by 184 runs
IPRC Cricket Ground, Kigali
Umpires: Habib Enesi (Nga) and Christopher Phiri (Zim)
Player of the match: Yalinde Nkanya (Tan)

- Tanzania won the toss and elected to bat.
- Yalinde Nkanya became the first player for Tanzania to take a five-wicket haul in men's T20Is.
