= 2021–22 Uganda Tri-Nation Series =

International cricket tournament

- Date: 10–17 September 2021
- Location: Uganda
- Result: Uganda won the tournament
Teams
Kenya	Nigeria	Uganda
Captains
Shem Ngoche	Joshua Ayannaike	Brian Masaba (Note: Deusdedit Muhumuza took over as captain for the remainder of the tournament after Brian Masaba withdrew due to injury on 12 September 2021.)
Most runs
Irfan Karim (160)	Sesan Adedeji (190)	Saud Islam (220)
Most wickets
Shem Ngoche (9)	Prosper Useni (8)	Henry Ssenyondo (10)

The 2021–22 Uganda Tri-Nation Series, also known as the Pearl of Africa T20I Series, was a Twenty20 International (T20I) cricket tournament that was held in Uganda in September 2021. The participating teams were the hosts Uganda, along with Kenya and Nigeria. The tournament was originally planned to consist of 13 T20I matches, with the sides facing each other four times in a round-robin stage, followed by a final between the top two teams. The round-robin was later reduced by three matches with each team facing each other three times. The tournament provided preparation for all sides ahead of T20 World Cup Africa Qualifier events took place in October and November 2021.

Ahead of the T20I tournament, Uganda and Kenya played a three-match 50-over series in preparation for Cricket World Cup Challenge League events scheduled later in 2021.

Kenya defeated their hosts in the first unofficial One Day International (ODI), recording a comfortable win by 78 runs. Uganda levelled the series by winning the second game by 9 wickets after bowling out the visitors for only 85 runs. Uganda won the third match by 3 wickets to claim the series 2–1.

Uganda defeated Kenya by 6 runs in the final of the T20I tournament.

== Squads ==
Kenya	Nigeria	Uganda
Shem Ngoche (c); Zahid Abbas; Emmanuel Bundi; Mohammed Kalyan; Irfan Karim (wk); Peter Langat; Brian Likavu (wk); Alex Obanda; Eugene Ochieng; Nelson Odhiambo; Nehemiah Odhiambo; Steve Odhiambo; Lucas Oluoch; Elijah Otieno; Rushab Patel; Vraj Patel; Gurdeep Singh; Dominic Wesonga	Joshua Ayannaike (c, wk); Rasheed Abolarin; Sesan Adedeji; Vincent Adewoye; Peter Aho; Daniel Ajekun; Odion Isesele; Abdulrahman Jimoh; Samuel Mba; Isaac Okpe; Sylvester Okpe; Olayinka Olaleye; Chimezie Onwuzulike; Sulaimon Runsewe; Mohameed Taiwo; Prosper Useni; Mustapha Yusuf	Brian Masaba (c); Fred Achelam (wk); Richard Agamiire; Frank Akankwasa; Bilal Hassan; Saud Islam; Jonathan Kizza; Cosmas Kyewuta; Deusdedit Muhumuza; Gerald Mubiru; Dinesh Nakrani; Harsh Panchal; Ronak Patel; Arnold Otwani (wk); Riazat Ali Shah; Jonathan Ssebanja; Henry Ssenyondo; Simon Ssesazi; Shahzad Ukani; Kenneth Waiswa; Charles Waiswa

On 12 September 2021 Cricket Uganda announced that Deusdedit Muhumuza would take over as captain for the remainder of the tournament after Brian Masaba withdrew from the squad due to injury.

== Unofficial ODI series ==
=== 1st unofficial ODI match ===
4 September 2021
10:00
Scorecard

Kenya; 306/7 (50 overs)	v	Uganda; 228 (46.2 overs)
Alex Obanda 73 (68); Henry Ssenyondo 3/42 (10 overs)		Riazat Ali Shah 74 (72); Nehemiah Odhiambo 4/15 (5.2 overs)

Kenya won by 78 runs
Kyambogo Cricket Oval, Kampala
Player of the match: Irfan Karim (Ken)

- Uganda won the toss and elected to field.

=== 2nd unofficial ODI match ===
5 September 2021
10:00
Scorecard

Kenya; 85 (29 overs)	v	Uganda; 87/1 (12.1 overs)
Rushab Patel 30 (37); Charles Waiswa 4/15 (7 overs)		Saud Islam 40* (29); Emmanuel Bundi 1/22 (3 overs)

Uganda won by 9 wickets
Kyambogo Cricket Oval, Kampala
Umpires: Simon Kintu (Uga) and Patric Makumbi (Uga)
Player of the match: Charles Waiswa (Uga)

- Kenya won the toss and elected to bat.

=== 3rd unofficial ODI match ===
7 September 2021
10:00
Scorecard

Kenya; 225/7 (50 overs)	v	Uganda; 229/7 (44.2 overs)
Emmanuel Bundi 47* (63); Dinesh Nakrani 4/40 (10 overs)		Riazat Ali Shah 55* (50); Shem Ngoche 3/29 (10 overs)

Uganda won by 3 wickets
Lugogo Stadium, Kampala
Umpires: Baker Elonge (Uga) and Patric Makumbi (Uga)
Player of the match: Riazat Ali Shah (Uga)

- Uganda won the toss and elected to field.

== T20I tournament ==
=== Points table ===
Team	P	W	L	T	NR	Pts	NRR
Uganda	6	4	1	0	1	9	+1.198
Kenya	6	3	2	0	1	7	+1.412
Nigeria	6	1	5	0	0	2	–2.250

=== Fixtures ===
10 September 2021
10:00
Scorecard

Kenya	v	Uganda

No result
Entebbe Cricket Oval, Entebbe
Umpires: Patric Makumbi (Uga) and Eric Wandera (Uga)

- Kenya won the toss and elected to bat.
- No play was possible due to rain.
- Bilal Hassan (Uga), Zahid Abbas, Peter Langat and Gurdeep Singh (Ken) all made their T20I debuts.

10 September 2021
14:00
Scorecard

Kenya; 151/9 (20 overs)	v	Uganda; 129 (19 overs)
Irfan Karim 67 (54); Dinesh Nakrani 2/20 (4 overs)		Saud Islam 61 (49); Nehemiah Odhiambo 3/22 (4 overs)

Kenya won by 22 runs
Entebbe Cricket Oval, Entebbe
Umpires: Baker Elonge (Uga) and Eric Wandera (Uga)
Player of the match: Irfan Karim (Ken)

- Kenya won the toss and elected to bat.

11 September 2021
10:00
Scorecard

Nigeria; 107/8 (20 overs)	v	Kenya; 108/2 (11.5 overs)
Peter Aho 26* (21); Shem Ngoche 2/9 (4 overs)		Gurdeep Singh 44 (35); Peter Aho 1/15 (0.5 overs)

Kenya won by 8 wickets
Entebbe Cricket Oval, Entebbe
Umpires: Simon Kintu (Uga) and Patric Makumbi (Uga)
Player of the match: Gurdeep Singh (Ken)

- Nigeria won the toss and elected to bat.
- Vraj Patel, Dominic Wesonga (Ken), Peter Aho, Odion Isesele, Prosper Useni and Mustapha Yusuf (Nga) all made their T20I debuts.

11 September 2021
14:00
Scorecard

Uganda; 152/4 (20 overs)	v	Nigeria; 96/6 (20 overs)
Riazat Ali Shah 40 (23); Vincent Adewoye 1/12 (2 overs)		Sesan Adedeji 24 (39); Frank Akankwasa 3/11 (4 overs)

Uganda won by 56 runs
Entebbe Cricket Oval, Entebbe
Umpires: Baker Elonge (Uga) and Eric Wandera (Uga)
Player of the match: Dinesh Nakrani (Uga)

- Uganda won the toss and elected to bat.

13 September 2021
10:00
Scorecard

Nigeria; 123/8 (20 overs)	v	Uganda; 124/2 (17 overs)
Peter Aho 44* (38); Henry Ssenyondo 3/15 (4 overs)		Simon Ssesazi 62 (53); Prosper Useni 1/13 (3 overs)

Uganda won by 8 wickets
Entebbe Cricket Oval, Entebbe
Umpires: Baker Elonge (Uga) and Simon Kintu (Uga)
Player of the match: Simon Ssesazi (Uga)

- Nigeria won the toss and elected to bat.
- Simon Ssesazi (Uga) made his T20I debut.

13 September 2021
14:00
Scorecard

Kenya; 162/5 (20 overs)	v	Nigeria; 101/7 (20 overs)
Irfan Karim 58 (46); Prosper Useni 2/17 (3 overs)		Daniel Ajekun 22 (38); Vraj Patel 2/11 (4 overs)

Kenya won by 61 runs
Entebbe Cricket Oval, Entebbe
Umpires: Patric Makumbi (Uga) and Eric Wandera (Uga)
Player of the match: Irfan Karim (Ken)

- Kenya won the toss and elected to bat.
- Olayinka Olaleye (Nga) made his T20I debut.

15 September 2021
10:00
Scorecard

Kenya; 123 (20 overs)	v	Uganda; 126/6 (19.2 overs)
Alex Obanda 31 (23); Bilal Hassan 4/17 (4 overs)		Simon Ssesazi 63 (55); Shem Ngoche 2/13 (4 overs)

Uganda won by 4 wickets
Entebbe Cricket Oval, Entebbe
Umpires: Baker Elonge (Uga) and Patric Makumbi (Uga)
Player of the match: Simon Ssesazi (Uga)

- Uganda won the toss and elected to field.

15 September 2021
14:00
Scorecard

Uganda; 172/6 (20 overs)	v	Nigeria; 117/7 (20 overs)
Saud Islam 75 (61); Rasheed Abolarin 2/26 (4 overs)		Sesan Adedeji 68 (58); Henry Ssenyondo 4/14 (4 overs)

Uganda won by 55 runs
Entebbe Cricket Oval, Entebbe
Umpires: Simon Kintu (Uga) and Eric Wandera (Uga)
Player of the match: Sesan Adedeji (Nga)

- Uganda won the toss and elected to bat.
- Gerald Mubiru (Uga) made his T20I debut.

16 September 2021
10:00
Scorecard

Nigeria; 133/5 (18 overs)	v	Kenya; 107/5 (15 overs)
Sesan Adedeji 55 (47); Elijah Otieno 2/23 (4 overs)		Shem Ngoche 41* (30); Rasheed Abolarin 3/8 (2 overs)

Nigeria won by 4 runs (DLS method)
Entebbe Cricket Oval, Entebbe
Umpires: Patric Makumbi (Uga) and Eric Wandera (Uga)
Player of the match: Sesan Adedeji (Nga)

- Nigeria won the toss and elected to bat.
- No further play was possible due to rain.

=== Final ===
17 September 2021
14:00
Scorecard

Uganda; 120/9 (20 overs)	v	Kenya; 114/8 (20 overs)
Ronak Patel 27 (22); Elijah Otieno 3/18 (4 overs)		Gurdeep Singh 44 (43); Frank Akankwasa 2/11 (4 overs)

Uganda won by 6 runs
Entebbe Cricket Oval, Entebbe
Umpires: Simon Kintu (Uga) and Eric Wandera (Uga)
Player of the match: Frank Akankwasa (Uga)

- Uganda won the toss and elected to bat.
- Elijah Otieno became the first bowler for Kenya to take a hat-trick in T20Is.
