= Gurdeep Singh (cricketer) =

Kenyan cricketer

Personal information
- Full name: Gurdeep Singh
- Born: 19 January 1998 (age 28); Nairobi, Kenya
- Batting: Left-handed
- Bowling: Legbreak
- Role: Opening batsman

International information
- National side: Kenya
- Only ODI (cap 50): 4 October 2013 v Afghanistan
- T20I debut (cap 34): 10 September 2021 v Uganda
- Last T20I: 18 November 2021 v Nigeria

Career statistics
Competition	ODI	LA	T20
Matches	1	10	5
Runs scored	1	163	13
Batting average	1.00	18.11	4.33
100s/50s	0/0	0/0	0/0
Top score	1	39	7
Catches/stumpings	0/0	0/0	0/0
- Source: Cricinfo, 18 November 2021

Gurdeep Singh (born 19 January 1998) is a Kenyan cricketer. He has played in one One Day International match for the national team. He played in the final match of the 2011–13 ICC World Cricket League Championship, against Afghanistan, on 4 October 2013. At the age of 15 years and 258 days, he became the second-youngest player to debut in an ODI.

In January 2018, he was named in Kenya's squad for the 2018 ICC World Cricket League Division Two tournament. In September 2018, he was named in Kenya's squad for the 2018 Africa T20 Cup. The following month, he was named in Kenya's squad for the 2018 ICC World Cricket League Division Three tournament in Oman.

In August 2021, he was named in Kenya's Twenty20 International (T20I) squad for the 2021–22 Uganda Tri-Nation Series. He made his T20I debut on 10 September 2021, for Kenya against Uganda. In October 2021, he was named in Kenya's squad for the Regional Final of the 2021 ICC Men's T20 World Cup Africa Qualifier tournament in Rwanda.
