= Dominic Wesonga =

Kenyan cricketer (born 1988)

Personal information
- Full name: Dominic Saleh Wesonga
- Born: 16 July 1988 (age 38); Nairobi, Kenya
- Batting: Right-handed
- Bowling: Right-arm fast-medium
- Role: Middle-order batsman

International information
- National side: Kenya (2010–present)
- ODI debut (cap 43): 7 July 2010 v Scotland
- Last ODI: 13 September 2011 v Netherlands
- T20I debut (cap 38): 11 September 2021 v Nigeria
- Last T20I: 16 September 2021 v Nigeria

Career statistics
Competition	ODI	FC	LA	T20
Matches	4	2	5	6
Runs scored	61	53	66	45
Batting average	29.33	13.25	16.50	11.25
100s/50s	0/0	0/0	0/0	0/0
Top score	33	34	33	27*
Balls bowled	42	204	84	69
Wickets	2	3	2	2
Bowling average	14.00	33.33	32.00	34.50
5 wickets in innings	0	0	0	0
10 wickets in match	0	0	0	0
Best bowling	2/28	2/29	2/28	2/24
Catches/stumpings	3/–	0/–	4/–	5/–
- Source: Cricinfo, 16 September 2021

Dominic Wesonga (born 16 July 1988) is a cricketer who plays for the Kenya cricket team. He played in four One Day International (ODI) matches in 2010 and 2011. In August 2021, he was named in Kenya's Twenty20 International (T20I) squad for the 2021–22 Uganda Tri-Nation Series. He made his T20I debut on 11 September 2021, for Kenya against Nigeria.
