= Entebbe Cricket Oval =

Cricket ground

Ground information
- Location: Entebbe, Uganda
- Country: Uganda

International information
- First men's T20I: 10 September 2021: Uganda v Kenya
- Last men's T20I: 27 July 2025: Uganda v United Arab Emirates
- First women's T20I: 9 December 2023: Kenya v Zimbabwe
- Last women's T20I: 7 November 2026: Uganda v Rwanda
- As of 7 November 2026; Source: Cricinfo

The Entebbe Cricket Oval is a cricket ground, in Entebbe, Uganda.

In August 2021, the ground was the venue for the 2021–22 Uganda Tri-Nation Series which involved Uganda's team along with Kenya and Nigeria.

To 2025, the venue hosted a total of 10 T20I matches, where the team batting first won six matches, while the team batting second won three matches. The average 1st innings score was 138 runs.
