= Jan-Izak de Villiers =

Namibian cricketer

- Born: 6 May 2001 (age 25)
- Cricket career

Cricket information
- Batting: Right-handed
- Bowling: Right-arm medium
- Role: Bowler

International information
- National side: Namibia
- ODI debut (cap 29): 8 January 2020 v Oman
- Last ODI: 9 January 2020 v UAE
- T20I debut (cap 32): 29 September 2024 v United Arab Emirates
- Last T20I: 1 October 2024 v United States
- Source: Cricinfo, 29 September 2024
- Field hockey career
- Sport: Field hockey
- Position: Midfielder
National team
Years	Team	Caps	Goals
2018	Namibia U18 Hockey5s	6	-
2022	Namibia	6	-

Jan-Izak de Villiers (born 6 May 2001) is a Namibian cricketer and field hockey player. In May 2019, he was named in Namibia's squad for the Regional Finals of the 2018–19 ICC T20 World Cup Africa Qualifier tournament in Uganda. Prior to his selection in the T20I team, he was named in Namibia's squads for the 2018 Under-19 Cricket World Cup and the 2019 ICC World Cricket League Division Two tournament.

In December 2019, he was one of three rookie players to be awarded a national contract with the Namibia cricket team. Later the same month, he was named in Namibia's One Day International (ODI) squad for the 2020 Oman Tri-Nation Series. He made his ODI debut for Namibia, against Oman, on 8 January 2020. He made his Twenty20 debut for Namibia, against Ireland Wolves, on 21 February 2020, during their tour to South Africa.
