= Vraj Patel =

Kenyan cricketer (born 2002)

Personal information
- Full name: Vraj Patel
- Born: 21 March 2002 (age 24); Nairobi, Kenya
- Batting: Left-handed
- Bowling: Slow left-arm orthodox
- Role: Bowler

International information
- National side: Kenya (2021–present)
- T20I debut (cap 37): 11 September 2021 v Nigeria
- Last T20I: 12 July 2024 v Nigeria

Career statistics
Competition	T20I	LA	T20
Matches	53	14	53
Runs scored	8	25	8
Batting average	4.00	12.50	4.00
100s/50s	0/0	0/0	0/0
Top score	4*	11*	4*
Balls bowled	1134	771	1134
Wickets	74	18	74
Bowling average	13.60	28.38	13.60
5 wickets in innings	1	0	1
10 wickets in match	0	0	0
Best bowling	5/12	3/34	5/12
Catches/stumpings	14/0	6/0	14/0
- Source: ESPNcricinfo, 6 May 2025

Vraj Patel is a Kenyan cricketer. Known mainly for his slow, left-arm orthodox bowling, he made his Twenty20 International (T20I) debut for Kenya on 11 September 2021 against Nigeria in a tri-nation tournament. In November 2021, he was included in Kenya's squad for the Africa qualifier of the 2022 Men's T20 World Cup in Rwanda. In that tournament, he took a five-wicket haul in Kenya's match against Nigeria. Kenya won the match by 60 runs, and Patel was adjudged player of the match.

In August 2022, Patel was included in Kenya's squad for their home bilateral series against Nepal. In November 2022, he was part of the Kenyan tam for the Africa A qualifier tournament of the 2024 ICC Men's T20 World Cup. In the first game of the 2022–23 ICC Men's T20 World Cup Africa Qualifier against Rwanda, he took 1 wicket for 33 runs.
