= Ruaraka Sports Club Ground =

Cricket ground in Nairobi, Kenya

- Interactive map of Ruaraka Sports Club Ground

Ground information
- Location: Nairobi, Kenya
- Country: Kenya
- Coordinates: 1°15′32″S 36°51′30″E
- Capacity: 1,000
- End names
- Thika Road End; Mathare Valley End

International information
- First men's ODI: 30 January 2007: Canada v Netherlands
- Last men's ODI: 5 February 2007: Bermuda v Scotland
- First men's T20I: 19 October 2024: Kenya v Mozambique
- Last men's T20I: 24 October 2024: Gambia v Mozambique

Team information
Kenya	(1986 – present)
- As of 19 October 2024; Source: ESPNCricinfo

The Ruaraka Sports Club Ground is one of several cricket venues in Nairobi accredited with full ODI status. This ground played host to the 1994 ICC Trophy final and was one of several grounds used during the 2007 World Cricket League Division one matches played in Kenya.

== List of Centuries ==
=== One Day Internationals ===
No.	Score	Player	Team	Balls	Inns.	Opposing team	Date	Result
1	137*	Ashish Bagai	Canada	172	2	Scotland	31 January 2007	Lost
2	104*	William Porterfield	Ireland	129	1	Kenya	2 February 2007	Lost
3	142	Kevin O'Brien	Ireland	125	1	Kenya	2 February 2007	Lost
4	109*	Ryan ten Doeschate	Netherlands	125	2	Bermuda	4 February 2007	Won

=== Twenty20 Internationals ===
No.	Score	Player	Team	Balls	Inns.	Opposing team	Date	Result
1	133*	Sikandar Raza	Zimbabwe	44	1	Gambia	3 October 2024	Won
2	120	Rakep Patel	Kenya	55	1	Mozambique	19 October 2024	Won
