= List of Kenya Twenty20 International cricketers =

Overall, 50 players have represented the Kenyan national cricket team in Twenty20 International (T20I) cricket. Kenya made its Twenty20 International debut in September 2007, against Bangladesh. Kenya lost its T20I status in January 2014, at the same time losing its One Day International (ODI) status. This was a result of the team's performance at the 2014 World Cup Qualifier, where they placed fifth. In April 2018, the ICC decided to grant full Twenty20 International (T20I) status to all its members. Therefore, all Twenty20 matches played between Kenya and other ICC members after 1 January 2019 will be eligible for T20I status.

This list includes all players who have played at least one T20I match and is initially arranged in the order of debut appearance. Where more than one player won their first cap in the same match, those players are initially listed alphabetically at the time of debut.

== Key ==
General

- ‡ – Captain
- † – Wicket-keeper
- First – Year of debut
- Last – Year of latest game
- Mat – Number of matches played

Batting

- Runs – Runs scored in career
- HS – Highest score
- Avg – Runs scored per dismissal
- 50 – Number of half centuries
- 100 – Number of Centuries
- * – Batsman remained not out

Bowling

- Balls – Balls bowled in career
- Wkt – Wickets taken in career
- BBI – Best bowling in an innings
- Ave – Average runs per wicket

Fielding

- Ca – Catches taken
- St – Stumpings affected

== List of players ==
Last updated 19 September 2026.

Kenya T20I cricketers
General					Batting					Bowling				Fielding		Ref
No.	Name	First	Last	Mat	Runs	HS	Avg	50	100	Balls	Wkt	BBI	Ave	Ca	St	Ref
1	Rajesh Bhudia	2007	2007	3	20	11*	10.00	0	0	44	0	–	–	1	0	
2	Jadavji Jesani	2007	2007	1	1	1	1.00	0	0	–	–	–	–	0	0	
3	Jimmy Kamande	2007	2010	12	83	42	9.22	0	0	206	13	3/28	16.30	1	0	
4	Tanmay Mishra	2007	2013	15	227	38	15.13	0	0	30	3	3/25	11.00	3	0	
5	Collins Obuya‡	2007	2024	75	1,742	96*	30.03	10	0	422	25	4/27	19.48	37	0	
6	David Obuya†	2007	2012	10	216	65*	27.00	2	0	–	–	–	–	2	1	
7	Thomas Odoyo‡	2007	2013	11	95	22	9.50	0	0	216	11	3/17	15.45	5	0	
8	Peter Ongondo	2007	2008	8	28	16	4.66	0	0	156	5	2/18	35.40	0	0	
9	Lameck Onyango	2007	2010	5	17	5	8.50	0	0	78	4	2/17	32.00	0	0	
10	Steve Tikolo‡	2007	2013	15	345	56*	28.75	2	0	170	12	4/2	14.00	5	0	
11	Hiren Varaiya	2007	2013	25	51	18*	51.00	0	0	464	18	2/10	25.61	12	0	
12	Alex Obanda	2007	2023	51	797	103*	18.53	1	1	–	–	–	–	7	0	
13	Tony Suji	2007	2010	8	15	7	5.00	0	0	97	4	2/23	29.00	3	0	
14	Nehemiah Odhiambo	2007	2022	43	284	41	10.92	0	0	613	30	5/20	27.73	10	0	
15	Morris Ouma‡†	2007	2013	22	127	19	7.05	0	0	–	–	–	–	8	5	
16	Ragheb Aga	2008	2013	20	213	52*	13.31	1	0	288	15	3/24	20.40	7	0	
17	Kennedy Otieno	2008	2008	4	74	40	18.50	0	0	–	–	–	–	2	0	
18	Rakep Patel‡	2008	2026	108	2,228	120	30.10	14	1	605	38	3/12	16.05	71	0	
19	Shem Ngoche‡	2010	2026	120	592	41*	12.08	0	0	2,410	136	4/14	16.94	38	0	
20	Nelson Odhiambo	2010	2024	64	538	67	15.82	2	0	462	22	3/30	28.72	6	0	
21	Duncan Allan	2012	2013	10	86	18	8.60	0	0	56	4	2/8	20.50	2	0	
22	James Ngoche	2012	2013	7	4	2	2.00	0	0	144	4	2/31	35.00	0	0	
23	Elijah Otieno	2012	2022	31	27	8	3.85	0	0	533	27	3/16	23.44	2	0	
24	Irfan Karim‡†	2013	2026	69	1,434	71*	36.76	9	0	–	–	–	–	66	26	
25	Lucas Oluoch‡	2013	2026	84	454	32	15.13	0	0	1,393	85	5/20	19.52	18	0	
26	Dhiren Gondaria‡	2013	2026	39	1057	94	34.09	8	0	245	21	4/17	12.23	17	0	
27	Pushpak Kerai	2019	2019	6	0	0	0.00	0	0	66	3	3/15	27.33	0	0	
28	Eugene Ochieng	2019	2022	10	21	16*	7.00	0	0	156	7	2/28	29.00	3	0	
29	Sachin Bhudia‡	2019	2026	57	753	77*	20.91	3	0	196	9	3/0	20.88	23	0	
30	Jasraj Kundi	2019	2025	23	197	31*	12.31	0	0	90	4	3/9	29.50	7	0	
31	Rushab Patel	2019	2026	66	1,226	75	23.57	4	0	62	8	2/1	7.00	35	0	
32	Aman Gandhi	2019	2019	3	86	50	43.00	1	0	–	–	–	–	0	0	
33	Emmanuel Bundi	2019	2024	35	63	21*	6.30	0	0	581	34	4/16	18.73	11	0	
34	Gurdeep Singh	2021	2026	19	324	75	20.25	1	0	36	2	2/16	28.50	6	0	
35	Peter Langat	2021	2026	53	34	9*	8.50	0	0	844	51	6/17	20.76	20	0	
36	Zahid Abbas	2021	2021	4	18	9	6.00	0	0	42	2	1/14	23.00	2	0	
37	Vraj Patel	2021	2025	64	14	4*	3.50	0	0	1,380	86	5/12	14.15	17	0	
38	Dominic Wesonga	2021	2021	3	–	–	–	–	–	12	0	–	–	3	0	
39	Sukhdeep Singh†	2021	2026	69	816	57*	17.73	2	0	6	0	–	–	38	10	
40	Gerard Mwendwa	2022	2026	34	20	6*	10.00	0	0	627	39	5/7	17.30	13	0	
41	Yash Talati	2022	2022	2	–	–	–	–	–	48	6	3/8	4.33	0	0	
42	Stephen Biko	2022	2022	2	–	–	–	–	–	36	1	1/26	33.00	0	0	
43	Pushkar Sharma	2022	2025	27	373	43	16.21	0	0	134	5	1/3	30.20	3	0	
44	Tanzeel Sheikh	2022	2025	24	186	48	13.28	0	0	66	2	2/15	25.50	6	0	
45	Vishil Patel	2023	2026	33	27	10*	9.00	0	0	549	40	4/5	14.30	10	0	
46	Francis Mutua	2023	2026	36	113	31	9.41	0	0	519	33	3/5	18.57	15	0	
47	Neil Mugabe	2023	2025	27	522	71	24.85	3	0	56	2	2/6	37.50	3	0	
48	Aarnav Patel	2024	2024	2	1	1*	–	0	0	30	3	3/22	11.66	0	0	
49	Sachin Gill	2024	2026	33	447	47*	23.52	0	0	686	46	7/7	13.65	6	0	
50	Nitish Hirani	2025	2026	7	35	19	17.50	0	0	168	11	4/21	17.27	1	0	
51	Subham Patel	2026	2026	7	123	24	20.50	0	0	–	–	–	–	3	0	
52	Brian Likavu	2026	2026	7	127	49	31.75	0	0	–	–	–	–	5	0	

== See also ==
- Twenty20 International
- Kenya national cricket team
- List of Kenya ODI cricketers
