= Dhiren Gondaria =

Kenyan cricketer (born 1994)

Dhiren Murji Gondaria
Personal information
- Full name: Dhiren Murji Gondaria
- Born: 5 December 1994 (age 31); Nirjapar, Gujarat, India
- Batting: Right-handed
- Bowling: Right-arm medium-fast
- Role: Batsman, occasional wicketkeeper

International information
- National side: Kenya (2013-present)
- ODI debut (cap 49): 2 October 2013 v Afghanistan
- Last ODI: 4 October 2013 v Afghanistan
- T20I debut (cap 26): 11 October 2013 v Afghanistan
- Last T20I: 23 May 2026 v Mali

Domestic team information
- Years: Team
- KANBIS SPORTS CLUB

Career statistics
Competition	ODI	T20I
Matches	2	5
Runs scored	7	58
Batting average	3.50	29.00
100s/50s	0/0	0/0
Top score	6	47*
Catches/stumpings	2/0	2/0
- Source: ESPNCricinfo, 27 October 2019

Dhiren Gondaria (born 5 December 1994) is a Kenyan cricketer. He has played in two One Day Internationals and two Twenty20 Internationals for the national team.

In January 2018, he was named in Kenya's squad for the 2018 ICC World Cricket League Division Two tournament. In September 2018, he was named in Kenya's squad for the 2018 Africa T20 Cup. The following month, he was named in Kenya's squad for the 2018 ICC World Cricket League Division Three tournament in Oman. Ahead of the tournament, he was named as the player to watch in Kenya's squad.

In May 2019, he was named in Kenya's squad for the Regional Finals of the 2018–19 ICC T20 World Cup Africa Qualifier tournament in Uganda. In September 2019, he was named in Kenya's squad for the 2019 ICC T20 World Cup Qualifier tournament in the United Arab Emirates. Ahead of the tournament, the International Cricket Council (ICC) named him as the player to watch in Kenya's squad. In November 2019, he was named in Kenya's squad for the Cricket World Cup Challenge League B tournament in Oman.
