= David Odhiambo =

Kenyan cricket umpire (born 1976)

Personal information
- Full name: David Odhiambo Agutu
- Born: 27 April 1976 (age 50); Nairobi, Kenya
- Role: Umpire

Umpiring information
- ODIs umpired: 9 (2012–2023)
- T20Is umpired: 69 (2012–2025)
- WODIs umpired: 1 (2021)
- WT20Is umpired: 16 (2022–2025)
- Source: Cricinfo, 2 April 2023

David Odhiambo (born 27 April 1976) is a Kenyan cricket umpire. As of April 2023, he has stood in nine One Day International (ODIs), 31 Twenty20 Internationals (T20Is), one women's ODI and four women's T20I matches.

He was one of the seventeen on-field umpires for the 2018 Under-19 Cricket World Cup, held in New Zealand. He was named as one of the eight on-field umpires for the 2019 ICC World Cricket League Division Two tournament in Namibia.

== See also ==
- List of One Day International cricket umpires
- List of Twenty20 International cricket umpires
