= Sachin Bhudia =

Kenyan cricketer (born 1998)

Personal information
- Full name: Sachin Ramniklal Bhudia
- Born: 24 September 1998 (age 28); Nairobi, Kenya
- Batting: Right-handed
- Bowling: Right-arm medium
- Role: All-rounder

International information
- National side: Kenya
- T20I debut (cap 29): 22 May 2019 v Uganda
- Last T20I: 24 October 2024 v Zimbabwe

Career statistics
Competition	T20I	LA	T20
Matches	44	12	44
Runs scored	523	206	523
Batting average	18.67	22.88	18.67
100s/50s	0/1	0/2	0/1
Top score	50*	54	50*
Balls bowled	184	97	184
Wickets	9	1	9
Bowling average	19.22	87.00	19.22
5 wickets in innings	–	–	–
10 wickets in match	–	–	–
Best bowling	3/0	1/11	3/0
Catches/stumpings	20/–	5/–	20/–
- Source: Cricinfo, 1 February 2025

Sachin Ramniklal Bhudia (born 24 September 1998) is a Kenyan cricketer. In December 2017, he was named as the captain of the Kenyan team for the 2018 Under-19 Cricket World Cup.

In October 2018, he was named in Kenya's squad for the 2018 ICC World Cricket League Division Three tournament in Oman. He played in Kenya's opening fixture of the tournament, against Oman on 9 November 2018.

In May 2019, Bhudia was named in Kenya's squad for the Regional Finals of the 2018–19 ICC T20 World Cup Africa Qualifier tournament in Uganda. He made his Twenty20 International (T20I) debut for Kenya against Uganda on 22 May 2019. In September 2019, he was named in Kenya's squad for the 2019 ICC T20 World Cup Qualifier tournament in the United Arab Emirates. In November 2019, he featured in the Kenyan team for the Cricket World Cup Challenge League B tournament in Oman. He made his List A debut against Jersey on 9 December 2019. In November 2022, Bhudia replaced Shem Ngoche as the captain of Kenya. He was named the captain of Kenyan team for the Africa Regional qualifier for 2024 T20I World Cup
