= Stephen Harris (umpire) =

South African cricket umpire (born 1980)

Personal information
- Full name: Stephen David Harris
- Born: 5 July 1980 (age 46); Port Elizabeth, South Africa
- Role: Umpire

Umpiring information
- T20Is umpired: 29 (2022–2026)
- WODIs umpired: 7 (2018–2022)
- WT20Is umpired: 6 (2018–2021)
- Source: ESPNcricinfo, 22 February 2023

Stephen Harris (born 5 July 1980) is a South African cricket umpire. He has stood in matches in the Sunfoil Series tournament. He is part of Cricket South Africa's umpire panel for first-class matches. As of February 2023, Harris has officiated in six Twenty20 Internationals (T2Is), six women's T20Is and seven women's One Day International matches.
