= Pushkar Sharma (cricketer) =

Kenyan cricketer

- Sharma in 2022

Personal information
- Born: 12 October 2000 (age 26); Jalgaon, Maharashtra, India
- Batting: Left-handed
- Bowling: Left-arm medium-fast
- Role: All-rounder

International information
- National side: Kenya
- T20I debut (cap 43): 17 November 2022 v Saint Helena
- Last T20I: 02 October 2025 v Zimbabwe
- T20I shirt no.: 12

Career statistics
Competition	T20I	List A
Matches	27	10
Runs scored	373	307
Batting average	16.21	34.11
100s/50s	0/0	0/3
Top score	43	78
Balls bowled	134	150
Wickets	5	6
Bowling average	30.20	25.50
5 wickets in innings	0	0
10 wickets in match	0	0
Best bowling	1/3	3/25
Catches/stumpings	2/–	3/–
- Source: Cricinfo, 31 August 2025

Pushkar Shivkumar Sharma (also known as Puoshkar Sharma) is a Kenyan cricketer who plays for the Kenya national cricket team. Born in India, he captained the Mumbai Under-16 cricket team. In 2019, He joined Ruaraka Sports Club and played in the Nairobi County Cricket Association league, finishing as the top scorer with 841 runs in 14 innings.

Sharma made his T20I debut for Kenya in 2022 during the ICC Men's T20 World Cup Africa Qualifiers, opening the batting alongside Collins Obuya. He was part of Kenya’s record 10-wicket victory over Mali national cricket team, scoring 14* in a chase completed in just 15 balls, one of the most dominant wins in T20I history.

He has also played in the 2025 Pearl of Africa T20 Series, and represented Kenya in the ICC Cricket World Cup Challenge League, scoring fifties against Denmark and Kuwait and finishing among Kenya’s top run-scorers.

Sharma has received sponsorship from IndiaFirst Life Insurance Company Limited, Mumbai, India.

== Super 90 League ==
In November 2026, Sharma was selected by Haryana Warriors during the auction for Season 4 of the Super 90 League, held in Mumbai on 12 November 2026. He is scheduled to represent the franchise in the tournament, which will take place in Nairobi, Kenya, from 3 to 12 December 2026..

== Family ==
Sharma married Sita Mishra on 7 December 2023. The couple had their first child in 2024. He lives in Nairobi and works as a marketing manager.

== Record ==
On 20 November 2022, Kenya national cricket team beat Mali national cricket team by 10 wickets with 105 balls remaining in the ICC Men's T20 World Cup Sub Regional Africa Qualifier Group A, chasing 31 in 15 balls—one of the most dominant T20I wins—with Pushkar Sharma (14*) and Collins Obuya (18*).
