= Rushab Patel =

Kenyan cricketer (born 1993)

Personal information
- Full name: Rushabhvardhan Nipun Patel
- Born: 29 June 1993 (age 33); Nairobi, Kenya
- Batting: Left-handed
- Bowling: Right-arm medium-fast

International information
- National side: Kenya
- T20I debut (cap 31): 21 October 2019 v Bermuda
- Last T20I: 24 October 2024 v Zimbabwe

Career statistics
| Competition | T20I | LA | T20 |
|---|---|---|---|
| Matches | 56 | 27 | 62 |
| Runs scored | 1054 | 594 | 1111 |
| Batting average | 23.95 | 27.00 | 22.67 |
| 100s/50s | 0/3 | 0/4 | 0/3 |
| Top score | 75 | 99* | 75 |
| Balls bowled | 62 | 24 | 68 |
| Wickets | 8 | 0 | 8 |
| Bowling average | 7.00 | – | 8.37 |
| 5 wickets in innings | – | – | – |
| 10 wickets in match | – | – | – |
| Best bowling | 2/1 | – | 2/1 |
| Catches/stumpings | 29/– | 10/– | 31/– |
- Source: ESPNcricinfo, 1 February 2025

Rushab Patel (born 29 June 1993) is a Kenyan cricketer. He made his List A debut in the 2015–17 ICC World Cricket League Championship on 28 May 2016 against Papua New Guinea. In January 2018, Patel was named in Kenya's squad for the 2018 ICC World Cricket League Division Two tournament.

In May 2019, he was included in the Kenyan team for the Regional Finals of the 2018–19 ICC T20 World Cup Africa Qualifier tournament in Uganda. In September 2019, he was named in Kenya's squad for the 2019 ICC T20 World Cup Qualifier tournament in the United Arab Emirates. He made his Twenty20 International (T20I) debut against Bermuda, on 21 October 2019. In November 2019, he was named in Kenya's squad for the Cricket World Cup Challenge League B tournament in Oman.

Patel was included in Kenya's squad, in October 2021, for the Regional Final of the 2021 ICC Men's T20 World Cup Africa Qualifier tournament in Rwanda.
