= Isaac Oyieko =

Kenyan cricket umpire (born 1979)

Personal information
- Full name: Isaac Otieno Oyieko
- Born: 8 April 1979 (age 47); Nairobi, Kenya
- Role: Umpire

Umpiring information
- ODIs umpired: 5 (2023)
- T20Is umpired: 71 (2007–2025)
- WT20Is umpired: 33 (2019–2025)
- Source: ESPNcricinfo, 5 April 2023

Isaac Otieno Oyieko (born 8 April 1979) is a Kenyan cricket umpire. He has umpired in Twenty20 International (T20I) matches since 2007 and had stood in 31 T20Is by April 2023. He officiated in his first One Day International (ODI) match, between Canada and Jersey, in the 2023 Cricket World Cup qualification tournament.

== See also ==
- List of One Day International cricket umpires
- List of Twenty20 International cricket umpires
