= Lucas Oluoch =

Kenyan cricketer

Personal information
- Full name: Lucas Oluoch Ndandason
- Born: 7 August 1991 (age 35); Nairobi, Kenya
- Batting: Right-handed
- Bowling: Left-arm fast-medium

International information
- National side: Kenya
- ODI debut (cap 47): 12 September 2011 v Netherlands
- Last ODI: 13 September 2011 v Netherlands
- T20I debut (cap 25): 19 April 2013 v Netherlands
- Last T20I: 12 July 2024 v Nigeria

Career statistics
Competition	ODI	T20I	FC	LA
Matches	2	64	1	34
Runs scored	6	333	4	210
Batting average	6.00	14.47	4.00	13.12
100s/50s	0/0	0/0	0/0	0/0
Top score	5*	32	4*	33
Balls bowled	96	1035	234	1368
Wickets	5	65	6	40
Bowling average	15.80	18.15	20.16	28.30
5 wickets in innings	0	1	0	0
10 wickets in match	0	0	0	0
Best bowling	3/41	5/20	3/58	4/36
Catches/stumpings	1/–	12/–	0/–	10/–
- Source: ESPNCricinfo, 30 January 2025

Lucas Oluoch Ndandason (born 7 August 1991) is a Kenyan cricketer. Domestically, he previously represented Nairobi Gymkhana Club, but since the 2011 season, he has been playing for Coast Pekee in the East African tournaments.

Oluoch's elder brother, Nick Oluoch, is a wicketkeeper who plays for Kongonis in the East African tournaments.

== International career ==
After impressing for the Gymkhana Club, Oluoch first got a call-up to the national side during Kenya's home series against Uganda, where they played 3 List A matches at the end of 2010. Oluoch impressed greatly on his official List A debut, taking an impressive 4 wickets for 32 runs, his best bowling figures at the List A level so far. As a result, the Ugandans were bowled out for 123. Kenya eventually took the series 2–1.

Oluoch made it to Kenya's provisional squad for the 2011 Cricket World Cup, but eventually did not make it to the final 15-member squad.

After a dismal World Cup campaign in which the team lost all of their matches, the selectors axed the under-performing seniors, and introduced performance-based contracts. Oluoch met that high-performance criteria, and was thus offered a central contract, a high honour, by the board.

As a number of players refused contracts offered by the board and left, Oluoch was one of thirteen players who accepted contracts and remained with the governing body. With Cricket Kenya deciding to leave out players who refused contracts, Oluoch received a call-up to play in the team's Intercontinental Cup and Intercontinental Cup One-Day matches against the Netherlands to be held away from home.

He made his official One-Day International (ODI) debut against the Dutch at Voorburg in that series (the matches he played against Uganda were only given List A status because Uganda was not an ODI cricket playing nation at that time). He took an impressive three wickets on debut.

After an impressive performance in the Netherlands, he was selected in Kenya's home series against the United Arab Emirates. He made his first-class cricket debut in the ICC Intercontinental Cup at Mombasa Sports Club. Oluoch took a handsome 6/121 on debut, but UAE won the match by 266 runs. Captain Collins Obuya's determined 62 could not prevent the hosts from defeat.

Following that, as a part of Kenya's preparations for the 2012 ICC World Twenty20 Qualifier, the board announced that the team would play seven unofficial Twenty20 matches in Namibia, followed by games against Zimbabwean franchise teams. Kenya could not manage much on that tour of Namibia, being defeated 6–2, but Oluoch did have an extraordinary T20 game against Namibia in which he took incredible figures of 4 wickets for 6 runs. Namibia were bowled out for 108, but unfortunately, Kenya were bowled out for an even lower 63 as the Namibians romped home by 45 runs.

In January 2018, he was named in Kenya's squad for the 2018 ICC World Cricket League Division Two tournament. In September 2018, he was named in Kenya's squad for the 2018 Africa T20 Cup.

In May 2019, he was named in Kenya's squad for the Regional Finals of the 2018–19 ICC T20 World Cup Africa Qualifier tournament in Uganda. In September 2019, he was named in Kenya's squad for the 2019 ICC T20 World Cup Qualifier tournament in the United Arab Emirates. In November 2019, he was named in Kenya's squad for the Cricket World Cup Challenge League B tournament in Oman.
