= Rakep Patel =

Kenyan cricketer (born 1989)

Rakesh Patel
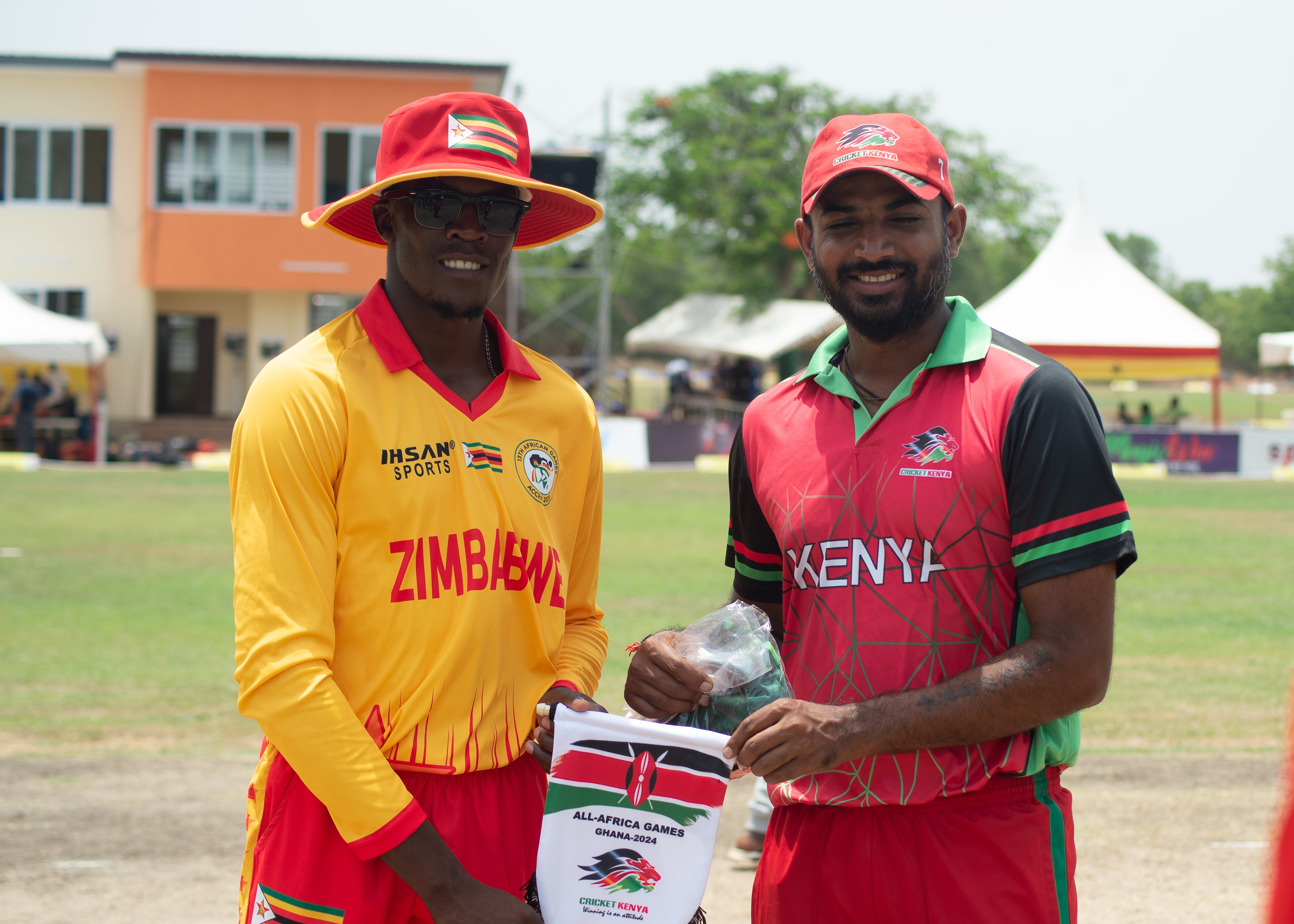
- Clive Madande and Rakep Patel, 2023 African Games

Personal information
- Full name: Rakesh Rajendra Patel
- Born: 12 July 1989 (age 37); Nairobi, Kenya
- Batting: Right-handed
- Bowling: Right arm off break
- Role: Wicket-Keeper–Batsman

International information
- National side: Kenya (2008–present)
- ODI debut (cap 36): 21 August 2008 v Netherlands
- Last ODI: 30 January 2014 v Scotland
- T20I debut (cap 18): 4 August 2008 v Scotland
- Last T20I: 25 November 2022 v Seychelles
- T20I shirt no.: 7

Career statistics
Competition	ODI	T20I	FC	LA
Matches	39	82	12	101
Runs scored	621	1,624	495	2,485
Batting average	20.03	30.07	20.62	30.30
100s/50s	0/2	1/8	1/1	3/12
Top score	92	120	130	124
Balls bowled	168	587	78	1,280
Wickets	2	37	0	25
Bowling average	67.50	15.89	–	39.44
5 wickets in innings	0	0	0	2
10 wickets in match	0	0	0	0
Best bowling	1/14	3/12	–	6/28
Catches/stumpings	18/0	50/–	9/–	52/–
- Source: Cricinfo, 6 May 2025

Rakep Patel (born 12 July 1989) is a Kenyan international cricketer. A product of the Nairobi Gymkhana Club, he is a wicket-keeper–batsman who plays right-handed, and occasionally bowls off spin.

== Career ==
He made his lone performance for the Kenya Select team in their inaugural season, and found himself called up to the national squad for their tour of Europe, including a tour of the Netherlands and the 2009 ICC World Twenty20 Qualifier.

In a 2013 ICC World Twenty20 Qualifier match against Nepal, Patel scored 103 off 45 balls, batting at number 6. This equalled the record of Dawid Malan for the highest Twenty20 score from a player batting at that position but has since been bettered.

In January 2018, Patel was named as captain of Kenya's squad for the 2018 ICC World Cricket League Division Two tournament. However, Kenya finished in sixth and last place in the tournament and were relegated to Division Three. As a result, Patel resigned as captain of the Kenyan team.

In September 2018, he was named in Kenya's squad for the 2018 Africa T20 Cup. The following month, he was named in Kenya's squad for the 2018 ICC World Cricket League Division Three tournament in Oman.

In May 2019, he was named in Kenya's squad for the Regional Finals of the 2018–19 ICC T20 World Cup Africa Qualifier tournament in Uganda. He was the leading run-scorer for Kenya in the Regional Finals, with 106 runs in three matches.

In September 2019, he was named in Kenya's squad for the 2019 ICC T20 World Cup Qualifier tournament in the United Arab Emirates. In November 2019, he was named in Kenya's squad for the Cricket World Cup Challenge League B tournament in Oman. In October 2021, he was named in Kenya's squad for the Regional Final of the 2021 ICC Men's T20 World Cup Africa Qualifier tournament in Rwanda.
