= List of five-wicket hauls in Twenty20 International cricket =

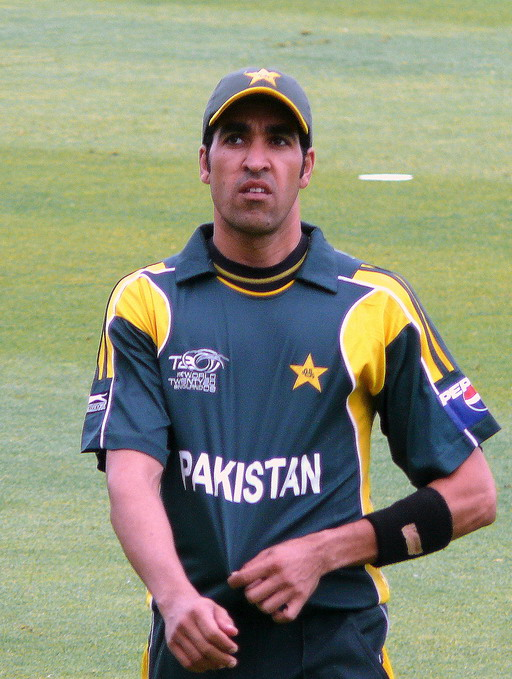
Pakistan's Umar Gul was the first player to take a five-wicket haul in a T20I match.

A Twenty20 International (T20I) is an international cricket match between two teams, each having T20I status, as determined by the International Cricket Council, the sport's world governing body. In a T20I, the two teams play a single innings each, which is restricted to a maximum of 20 overs. The format was originally introduced by the England and Wales Cricket Board for the county cricket competition with the first matches contested on 13 June 2003 between the English counties in the Twenty20 Cup. The first T20I took place on 17 February 2005 when Australia defeated New Zealand by 44 runs at Eden Park in Auckland.

A five-wicket haul (also known as a "five-for" or "fifer") refers to a bowler taking five or more wickets in a single innings. This is regarded as a notable achievement, especially in the Twenty20 format, as bowlers can bowl no more than four overs in an innings. The first five-wicket haul in a T20I match was taken by Pakistan's Umar Gul while playing against New Zealand at The Oval during the 2009 ICC World Twenty20. Bahrain's Rizwan Butt is the only bowler to have taken 4 five-wicket hauls.

Five bowlers have taken a five-wicket haul on T20I debut. Tanzania's Yalinde Nkanya has taken the most economical five-wicket haul with an economy rate of just 0.50. He ended with the figures of 5/2 in 4 overs. The least economical five-wicket haul was taken by Arshdeep Singh of India with an economy rate of 12.75. He ended with the figures of 5/51 in 4 overs. Tomakanute Ritawa of Cook Islands is the oldest player to take five wickets in an T20I innings, achieving the feat at the age of 46 years and 299 days, while Charles Hinze of Japan, is the youngest at 15 years and 224 days.

As of November 2026, 251 five-wicket hauls have been taken by 215 different players. West Indies lead the list with 10 five-wicket hauls.

== Key ==
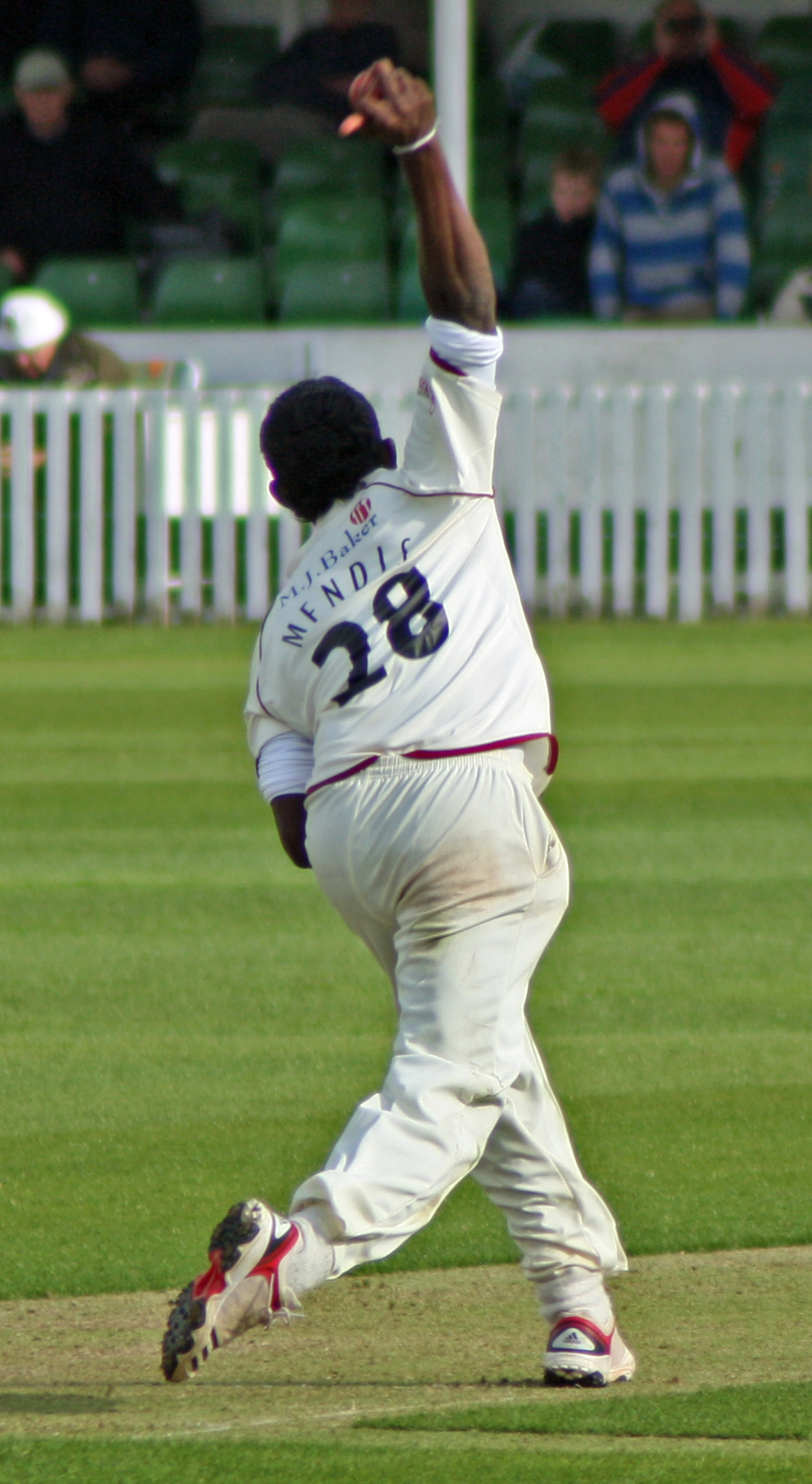
Ajantha Mendis of Sri Lanka is the only bowler to have taken two six-wicket hauls in T20Is.

Key
| Symbol | Meaning |
|---|---|
| Bowler | The bowler who took the five-wicket haul |
| Wkts | Number of wickets taken |
| Runs | Number of runs conceded |
| Overs | Number of overs bowled |
| Econ | Economy rate (runs conceded per over) |
| Inn | Innings in which the five-wicket haul was taken |
| Team | The team the bowler was representing |
| Opposition | The team the bowler was playing against |
| Venue | The cricket ground where the match was played |
| Date | Day on which the match was held |
| Result | Result for the team for which the five-wicket haul was taken |
| DLS | The result was decided by the Duckworth–Lewis–Stern method |
| | Light blue background indicates this happened during a Men's T20 World Cup match. |

== Five-wicket hauls ==
List of five-wicket hauls in Twenty20 International cricket
| No. | Bowler | O | R | W | Inn | Team | Opposition | Venue | Date | Result | Ref. |
|---|---|---|---|---|---|---|---|---|---|---|---|
| 1 | Umar Gul (1/2) | 3 | 6 | 5 | 1 | Pakistan | New Zealand | The Oval, London | 13 June 2009 | Won | |
| 2 | Nehemiah Odhiambo | 4 | 20 | 5 | 1 | Kenya | Scotland | Gymkhana Club Ground, Nairobi | 4 February 2010 | Won | |
| 3 | Daren Sammy | 3.5 | 26 | 5 | 1 | West Indies | Zimbabwe | Queen's Park Oval, Port of Spain | 28 February 2010 | Lost | |
| 4 | Ryan McLaren | 3.5 | 19 | 5 | 2 | South Africa | West Indies | Sir Vivian Richards Stadium, Antigua | 19 May 2010 | Won | |
| 5 | Tim Southee (1/2) | 4 | 18 | 5 | 1 | New Zealand | Pakistan | Eden Park, Auckland | 26 December 2010 | Won | |
| 6 | Ajantha Mendis (1/2) | 4 | 16 | 6 | 2 | Sri Lanka | Australia | Pallekele International Cricket Stadium, Pallekele | 8 August 2011 | Won | |
| 7 | Elias Sunny | 4 | 13 | 5 | 2 | Bangladesh | Ireland | Stormont, Belfast | 18 July 2012 | Won | |
| 8 | Ajantha Mendis (2/2) | 4 | 8 | 6 | 2 | Sri Lanka | Zimbabwe | Mahinda Rajapaksa International Cricket Stadium, Hambantota | 18 September 2012 | Won | |
| 9 | Lasith Malinga (1/2) | 4 | 31 | 5 | 2 | Sri Lanka | England | Pallekele International Cricket Stadium, Pallekele | 1 October 2012 | Won | |
| 10 | Umar Gul (2/2) | 2.2 | 6 | 5 | 2 | Pakistan | South Africa | SuperSport Park, Centurion | 3 March 2013 | Won | |
| 11 | Samiullah Shenwari | 4 | 13 | 5 | 2 | Afghanistan | Kenya | Sharjah Cricket Stadium, Sharjah | 24 November 2013 | Won | |
| 12 | Ahsan Malik | 4 | 19 | 5 | 1 | Netherlands | South Africa | Zohur Ahmed Chowdhury Stadium, Chittagong | 27 March 2014 | Lost | |
| 13 | Rangana Herath | 3.3 | 3 | 5 | 2 | Sri Lanka | New Zealand | Zohur Ahmed Chowdhury Stadium, Chittagong | 31 March 2014 | Won | |
| 14 | David Wiese | 4 | 23 | 5 | 2 | South Africa | West Indies | Kingsmead Cricket Ground, Durban | 14 January 2015 | Won | |
| 15 | Alasdair Evans | 4 | 24 | 5 | 1 | Scotland | Netherlands | The Grange Club, Edinburgh | 11 July 2015 | Lost | |
| 16 | Mark Watt | 4 | 27 | 5 | 2 | Scotland | Netherlands | ICC Academy, Dubai | 5 February 2016 | Won | |
| 17 | James Faulkner | 4 | 27 | 5 | 2 | Australia | Pakistan | Punjab Cricket Association Stadium, Mohali | 25 March 2016 | Won | |
| 18 | Mustafizur Rahman (1/2) | 4 | 22 | 5 | 1 | Bangladesh | New Zealand | Eden Gardens, Kolkata | 26 March 2016 | Lost | |
| 19 | Imad Wasim | 4 | 14 | 5 | 1 | Pakistan | West Indies | Dubai International Cricket Stadium, Dubai | 23 September 2016 | Won | |
| 20 | Yuzvendra Chahal | 4 | 25 | 6 | 2 | India | England | M. Chinnaswamy Stadium, Bangalore | 1 February 2017 | Won | |
| 21 | Imran Tahir (1/2) | 3.5 | 24 | 5 | 2 | South Africa | New Zealand | Eden Park, Auckland | 17 February 2017 | Won | |
| 22 | Rashid Khan (1/2) | 2 | 3 | 5 | 2 | Afghanistan | Ireland | Shaheed Vijay Singh Pathik Sports Complex, Greater Noida | 10 March 2017 | Won (DLS) | |
| 23 | Bhuvneshwar Kumar (1/2) | 4 | 24 | 5 | 2 | India | South Africa | Wanderers Stadium, Johannesburg | 18 February 2018 | Won | |
| 24 | Kuldeep Yadav (1/2) | 4 | 24 | 5 | 1 | India | England | Old Trafford, Manchester | 3 July 2018 | Won | |
| 25 | Imran Tahir (2/2) | 4 | 23 | 5 | 2 | South Africa | Zimbabwe | Buffalo Park, East London | 9 October 2018 | Won | |
| 26 | Shakib Al Hasan (1/2) | 4 | 20 | 5 | 2 | Bangladesh | West Indies | Sher-e-Bangla National Cricket Stadium, Dhaka | 20 December 2018 | Won | |
| 27 | Keemo Paul (1/2) | 4 | 15 | 5 | 2 | West Indies | Bangladesh | Sher-e-Bangla National Cricket Stadium, Dhaka | 22 December 2018 | Won | |
| 28 | Ibrahim Hassan | 3.4 | 24 | 5 | 2 | Maldives | Bahrain | Al Amerat Cricket Stadium (Ministry Turf 1), Muscat | 21 January 2019 | Lost | |
| 29 | Rashid Khan (2/2) | 4 | 27 | 5 | 2 | Afghanistan | Ireland | Rajiv Gandhi International Cricket Stadium, Dehradun | 24 February 2019 | Won | |
| 30 | Christi Viljoen | 4 | 9 | 5 | 1 | Namibia | Botswana | Kyambogo Cricket Oval, Kampala | 22 May 2019 | Won | |
| 31 | Charles Perchard | 4 | 17 | 5 | 2 | Jersey | Guernsey | King George V Sports Ground, Castel | 1 June 2019 | Won | |
| 32 | Damien Ravu | 4 | 15 | 5 | 1 | Papua New Guinea | Vanuatu | Faleata Oval 3, Vaitele | 9 July 2019 | Won | |
| 33 | Nalin Nipiko | 3.4 | 19 | 5 | 2 | Vanuatu | Papua New Guinea | Faleata Oval 3, Vaitele | 9 July 2019 | Lost | |
| 34 | Joshua Rasu | 2.5 | 36 | 5 | 1 | Vanuatu | Papua New Guinea | Faleata Oval 2, Vaitele | 12 July 2019 | Lost | |
| 35 | Norman Vanua | 4 | 17 | 5 | 2 | Papua New Guinea | Vanuatu | Faleata Oval 2, Vaitele | 13 July 2019 | Won | |
| 36 | Allan Douglas | 2.2 | 18 | 5 | 1 | Bermuda | Cayman Islands | White Hill Field, Sandys Parish | 25 August 2019 | Won | |
| 37 | Ankush Nanda | 2.3 | 6 | 5 | 1 | Luxembourg | Turkey | Moara Vlasiei Cricket Ground, Ilfov County | 29 August 2019 | Won | |
| 38 | Lasith Malinga (2/2) | 4 | 6 | 5 | 2 | Sri Lanka | New Zealand | Pallekele International Cricket Stadium, Kandy | 6 September 2019 | Won | |
| 39 | Pedro Arrighi | 4 | 4 | 5 | 2 | Argentina | Brazil | El Cortijo Polo Club Pitch 3, Lima | 4 October 2019 | Won | |
| 40 | Aamir Kaleem (1/2) | 4 | 15 | 5 | 1 | Oman | Nepal | Al Amerat Cricket Stadium, Muscat | 10 October 2019 | Won | |
| 41 | Deepak Chahar | 3.2 | 7 | 6 | 2 | India | Bangladesh | Vidarbha Cricket Association Stadium, Nagpur | 10 November 2019 | Won | |
| 42 | Karim Janat | 4 | 11 | 5 | 2 | Afghanistan | West Indies | Ekana Cricket Stadium, Lucknow | 16 November 2019 | Won | |
| 43 | Deusdedit Muhumuza | 3.4 | 13 | 5 | 2 | Uganda | Qatar | West End Park International Cricket Stadium, Doha | 15 February 2020 | Won | |
| 44 | Khizar Hayat | 2 | 4 | 5 | 2 | Malaysia | Hong Kong | Kinrara Academy Oval, Kuala Lumpur | 20 February 2020 | Won (DLS) | |
| 45 | Ashton Agar (1/2) | 4 | 24 | 5 | 2 | Australia | South Africa | Wanderers Stadium, Johannesburg | 21 February 2020 | Won | |
| 46 | Haroon Arshad | 3.1 | 16 | 5 | 2 | Hong Kong | Nepal | Terdthai Cricket Ground, Bangkok | 1 March 2020 | Won | |
| 47 | Oshane Thomas | 3 | 28 | 5 | 2 | West Indies | Sri Lanka | Pallekele International Cricket Stadium, Kandy | 4 March 2020 | Won | |
| 48 | Lockie Ferguson | 4 | 21 | 5 | 1 | New Zealand | West Indies | Eden Park, Auckland | 27 November 2020 | Won | |
| 49 | Dwaine Pretorius | 4 | 17 | 5 | 1 | South Africa | Pakistan | Gaddafi Stadium, Lahore | 13 February 2021 | Won | |
| 50 | Ashton Agar (2/2) | 4 | 30 | 6 | 2 | Australia | New Zealand | Wellington Regional Stadium, Wellington | 3 March 2021 | Won | |
| 51 | Aqib Iqbal | 4 | 5 | 5 | 2 | Austria | Belgium | Royal Brussels Cricket Club, Waterloo | 24 July 2021 | Lost | |
| 52 | Hassan Mehmood | 3.5 | 14 | 5 | 1 | Sweden | Denmark | Svanholm Park, Brøndby | 14 August 2021 | Lost | |
| 53 | Asif Bevinje | 4 | 30 | 5 | 2 | Romania | Hungary | Moara Vlasiei Cricket Ground, Ilfov County | 3 September 2021 | Won | |
| 54 | Waseem Abbas | 4 | 37 | 5 | 1 | Malta | Romania | Moara Vlasiei Cricket Ground, Ilfov County | 4 September 2021 | Lost | |
| 55 | Jan Frylinck | 4 | 24 | 6 | 2 | Namibia | United Arab Emirates | ICC Academy Ground, Dubai | 5 October 2021 | Won | |
| 56 | Samson Awiah | 4 | 23 | 5 | 1 | Ghana | Rwanda | Gahanga International Cricket Stadium, Kigali | 16 October 2021 | Won | |
| 57 | Kofi Bagabena | 4 | 9 | 5 | 1 | Ghana | Seychelles | Gahanga International Cricket Stadium, Kigali | 16 October 2021 | Won | |
| 58 | Moazzam Baig (1/3) | 4 | 13 | 5 | 1 | Malawi | Eswatini | IPRC Cricket Ground, Kigali | 17 October 2021 | Won | |
| 59 | Rexford Bakum | 4 | 26 | 5 | 2 | Ghana | Lesotho | Gahanga International Cricket Stadium, Kigali | 17 October 2021 | Won | |
| 60 | Dinesh Nakrani (1/2) | 4 | 7 | 6 | 1 | Uganda | Lesotho | IPRC Cricket Ground, Kigali | 19 October 2021 | Won | |
| 61 | Samuel Conteh (1/2) | 4 | 17 | 5 | 1 | Sierra Leone | Nigeria | University of Lagos Cricket Oval, Lagos | 20 October 2021 | Lost | |
| 62 | Dinesh Nakrani (2/2) | 4 | 8 | 5 | 2 | Uganda | Seychelles | IPRC Cricket Ground, Kigali | 22 October 2021 | Won | |
| 63 | Peter Aho | 3.4 | 5 | 6 | 2 | Nigeria | Sierra Leone | University of Lagos Cricket Oval, Lagos | 24 October 2021 | Won | |
| 64 | Mujeeb Ur Rahman | 4 | 20 | 5 | 2 | Afghanistan | Scotland | Sharjah Cricket Stadium, Sharjah | 25 October 2021 | Won | |
| 65 | Abass Gbla | 4 | 16 | 5 | 1 | Sierra Leone | Nigeria | University of Lagos Cricket Oval, Lagos | 26 October 2021 | Lost | |
| 66 | Francisco Couana | 4 | 19 | 5 | 2 | Mozambique | Cameroon | Gahanga International Cricket Stadium, Kigali | 3 November 2021 | Won | |
| 67 | Adam Zampa | 4 | 19 | 5 | 1 | Australia | Bangladesh | Dubai International Cricket Stadium, Dubai | 4 November 2021 | Won | |
| 68 | Hernán Fennell (1/2) | 4 | 18 | 6 | 2 | Argentina | Panama | Sir Vivian Richards Stadium, Antigua | 10 November 2021 | Won | |
| 69 | Dillon Heyliger | 4 | 16 | 5 | 1 | Canada | Argentina | Sir Vivian Richards Stadium, Antigua | 13 November 2021 | Won | |
| 70 | Vraj Patel | 4 | 12 | 5 | 2 | Kenya | Nigeria | IPRC Cricket Ground, Kigali | 20 November 2021 | Won | |
| 71 | Jason Holder | 2.5 | 27 | 5 | 2 | West Indies | England | Kensington Oval, Bridgetown | 30 January 2022 | Won | |
| 72 | Aamir Kaleem (2/2) | 4 | 29 | 5 | 1 | Oman | United Arab Emirates | Oman Cricket Academy Ground Turf 1, Muscat | 14 February 2022 | Won | |
| 73 | Junaid Aziz | 1.4 | 5 | 5 | 1 | Bahrain | Germany | Oman Cricket Academy Ground Turf 2, Muscat | 18 February 2022 | Won | |
| 74 | Ahmed Raza | 4 | 19 | 5 | 2 | United Arab Emirates | Nepal | Oman Cricket Academy Ground Turf 1, Muscat | 22 February 2022 | Won | |
| 75 | Karan KC | 3.4 | 21 | 5 | 2 | Nepal | Papua New Guinea | Tribhuvan University International Cricket Ground, Kirtipur | 31 March 2022 | Won | |
| 76 | JJ Smit | 4 | 10 | 6 | 2 | Namibia | Uganda | United Ground, Windhoek | 10 April 2022 | Won | |
| 77 | Lorne Burns | 4 | 11 | 5 | 1 | Spain | Guernsey | Desert Springs Cricket Ground, Almería | 30 April 2022 | Won | |
| 78 | Zaker Taqawi (1/2) | 4 | 25 | 5 | 1 | Sweden | Germany | Bayer Uerdingen Cricket Ground, Krefeld | 11 June 2022 | Lost | |
| 79 | Saurabh Netravalkar | 4 | 12 | 5 | 2 | United States | Singapore | Bulawayo Athletic Club, Bulawayo | 12 July 2022 | Won | |
| 80 | Zaker Taqawi (2/2) | 4 | 17 | 5 | 1 | Sweden | Croatia | Kerava National Cricket Ground, Kerava | 13 July 2022 | Won | |
| 81 | Fred Klaassen | 4 | 19 | 5 | 2 | Netherlands | Uganda | Queens Sports Club, Bulawayo | 14 July 2022 | Won | |
| 82 | Sahel Zadran | 3.1 | 13 | 5 | 2 | Austria | Slovenia | Kerava National Cricket Ground, Kerava | 25 July 2022 | Won | |
| 83 | Muhammad Butt | 3.1 | 8 | 5 | 2 | Norway | Czech Republic | Tikkurila Cricket Ground, Vantaa | 25 July 2022 | Won | |
| 84 | Lungi Ngidi | 4 | 39 | 5 | 1 | South Africa | England | County Ground, Bristol | 27 July 2022 | Lost | |
| 85 | Sudesh Wickramasekara | 3.1 | 15 | 5 | 1 | Czech Republic | Bulgaria | Tikkurila Cricket Ground, Vantaa | 31 July 2022 | Won | |
| 86 | Mosaddek Hossain | 4 | 20 | 5 | 1 | Bangladesh | Zimbabwe | Harare Sports Club, Harare | 31 July 2022 | Won | |
| 87 | Jai Sinh | 4 | 23 | 5 | 1 | Switzerland | Luxembourg | Tikkurila Cricket Ground, Vantaa | 31 July 2022 | Lost | |
| 88 | Tabraiz Shamsi | 4 | 24 | 5 | 2 | South Africa | England | Rose Bowl, Southampton | 31 July 2022 | Won | |
| 89 | Obed McCoy | 4 | 17 | 6 | 1 | West Indies | India | Warner Park, St. Kitts and Nevis | 1 August 2022 | Won | |
| 90 | Wayne Parnell | 4 | 30 | 5 | 2 | South Africa | Ireland | County Ground, Bristol | 5 August 2022 | Won | |
| 91 | Sandeep Lamichhane (1/2) | 4 | 9 | 5 | 1 | Nepal | Kenya | Gymkhana Club Ground, Nairobi | 29 August 2022 | Lost | |
| 92 | Bhuvneshwar Kumar (2/2) | 4 | 4 | 5 | 2 | India | Afghanistan | Dubai International Cricket Stadium, Dubai | 8 September 2022 | Won | |
| 93 | Tomakanute Ritawa | 4 | 19 | 5 | 1 | Cook Islands | Fiji | Vanuatu Cricket Ground, Port Vila | 14 September 2022 | Won | |
| 94 | Dhruv Maisuria (1/2) | 4 | 18 | 5 | 2 | Botswana | Ghana | Willowmoore Park, Benoni | 18 September 2022 | Won | |
| 95 | Reo Sakurano-Thomas (1/2) | 4 | 17 | 5 | 2 | Japan | Indonesia | Sano International Cricket Ground, Sano | 9 October 2022 | Won | |
| 96 | Sam Curran | 3.4 | 10 | 5 | 1 | England | Afghanistan | Perth Stadium, Perth | 22 October 2022 | Won | |
| 97 | Dhruv Maisuria (2/2) | 3.4 | 30 | 5 | 1 | Botswana | Lesotho | IPRC Ground, Kigali | 18 November 2022 | Won | |
| 98 | Samay Shrivastava | 4 | 18 | 5 | 2 | Oman | Bahrain | Al Amerat Cricket Stadium (Ministry Turf 1), Muscat | 19 November 2022 | Won | |
| 99 | Peter Langat | 4 | 17 | 6 | 1 | Kenya | Mali | IPRC Ground, Kigali | 20 November 2022 | Won | |
| 100 | Andrew Yon | 3 | 10 | 5 | 2 | Saint Helena | Lesotho | IPRC Ground, Kigali | 22 November 2022 | Won | |
| 101 | Daniel Jakiel (1/2) | 4 | 11 | 5 | 2 | Malawi | Lesotho | IPRC Ground, Kigali | 25 November 2022 | Won | |
| 102 | Sylvester Okpe | 4 | 9 | 5 | 1 | Nigeria | Cameroon | Rwanda Cricket Stadium, Kigali | 5 December 2022 | Won | |
| 103 | Richmond Baaleri | 4 | 29 | 5 | 2 | Ghana | Gambia | Rwanda Cricket Stadium, Kigali | 8 December 2022 | Won | |
| 104 | Yalinde Nkanya | 4 | 2 | 5 | 2 | Tanzania | Cameroon | IPRC Ground, Kigali | 9 December 2022 | Won | |
| 105 | Rizwan Butt (1/4) | 3.5 | 16 | 5 | 1 | Bahrain | Singapore | UKM-YSD Cricket Oval, Bangi | 21 December 2022 | Won | |
| 106 | Mohammad Kamran (1/2) | 4 | 9 | 5 | 1 | Spain | Isle of Man | La Manga Club Bottom Ground, Cartagena | 25 February 2023 | Won | |
| 107 | Shafat Ali Syed | 4 | 31 | 5 | 1 | Spain | Isle of Man | La Manga Club Bottom Ground, Cartagena | 26 February 2023 | Won | |
| 108 | Kervon Hinds | 4 | 18 | 5 | 1 | Bahamas | Cayman Islands | St Albans Club, Buenos Aires | 28 February 2023 | Lost | |
| 109 | Alzarri Joseph | 4 | 40 | 5 | 2 | West Indies | South Africa | Wanderers Stadium, Johannesburg | 28 March 2023 | Won | |
| 110 | Shakib Al Hasan (2/2) | 4 | 22 | 5 | 2 | Bangladesh | Ireland | Zohur Ahmed Chowdhury Stadium, Chittagong | 29 March 2023 | Won | |
| 111 | Adam Milne | 4 | 26 | 5 | 1 | New Zealand | Sri Lanka | University Oval, Dunedin | 5 April 2023 | Won | |
| 112 | Siraj Ullah Khadem | 3.3 | 17 | 5 | 2 | Portugal | Malta | Europa Sports Complex, Gibraltar | 4 May 2023 | Won | |
| 113 | Saud Munir | 4 | 21 | 5 | 1 | Denmark | Norway | Svanholm Park, Brøndby | 18 May 2023 | Won | |
| 114 | Raza Iqbal | 3.4 | 23 | 5 | 2 | Norway | Sweden | Solvangs Park, Glostrup | 18 May 2023 | Won | |
| 115 | Ghulam Ahmadi | 4 | 23 | 5 | 1 | Germany | Belgium | Bayer Uerdingen Cricket Ground, Krefeld | 10 June 2023 | Won | |
| 116 | Prakash Mishra | 3.4 | 16 | 5 | 1 | Bulgaria | Croatia | National Sports Academy, Sofia | 23 June 2023 | Won | |
| 117 | Shayam Warnakulasuriya | 4 | 12 | 5 | 2 | France | Luxembourg | Marsa Sports Club, Marsa | 11 July 2023 | Won | |
| 118 | Waqas Ahmad | 3.3 | 11 | 5 | 1 | Malta | France | Marsa Sports Club, Marsa | 16 July 2023 | Won | |
| 119 | Kabua Morea | 4 | 9 | 5 | 2 | Papua New Guinea | Philippines | Amini Park, Port Moresby | 23 July 2023 | Won | |
| 120 | Gavin Main | 3.4 | 26 | 5 | 2 | Scotland | Italy | Grange Cricket Club, Edinburgh | 24 July 2023 | Won | |
| 121 | Syazrul Idrus | 4 | 8 | 7 | 1 | Malaysia | China | Bayuemas Oval, Kuala Lumpur | 26 July 2023 | Won | |
| 122 | Bradley Currie | 4 | 13 | 5 | 2 | Scotland | Ireland | Grange Cricket Club, Edinburgh | 28 July 2023 | Won | |
| 123 | Stefano di Bartolomeo | 4 | 14 | 5 | 1 | Italy | Germany | Grange Cricket Club, Edinburgh | 28 July 2023 | Won | |
| 124 | Kepler Lukies | 4 | 10 | 5 | 2 | Philippines | Vanuatu | Amini Park, Port Moresby | 29 July 2023 | Lost | |
| 125 | Tim Southee (2/2) | 4 | 25 | 5 | 2 | New Zealand | United Arab Emirates | Dubai International Cricket Stadium, Dubai | 17 August 2023 | Won | |
| 126 | Nasrulla Rana | 4 | 12 | 6 | 2 | Hong Kong | Papua New Guinea | Bayuemas Oval, Pandamaran | 24 September 2023 | Lost | |
| 127 | Abinash Bohara | 3.4 | 11 | 6 | 2 | Nepal | Maldives | Zhejiang University of Technology Cricket Field, Hangzhou | 1 October 2023 | Won | |
| 128 | Ishtiaq Ahmad | 4 | 27 | 5 | 1 | Saudi Arabia | Kuwait | West End Park International Cricket Stadium, Doha | 1 October 2023 | Won | |
| 129 | Derrick Brangman | 4 | 19 | 5 | 2 | Bermuda | Cayman Islands | Bermuda National Stadium, Hamilton | 3 October 2023 | Won | |
| 130 | Lucas Rossi | 4 | 3 | 5 | 1 | Argentina | Chile | St George's College Ground, Buenos Aires | 20 October 2023 | Won | |
| 131 | Muhammad Amir | 3 | 16 | 5 | 2 | Malaysia | Singapore | Tribhuvan University International Cricket Ground, Kirtipur | 2 November 2023 | Won | |
| 132 | Kuldeep Yadav (2/2) | 2.5 | 17 | 5 | 2 | India | South Africa | Wanderers Stadium, Johannesburg | 14 December 2023 | Won | |
| 133 | Moazzam Baig (2/3) | 4 | 9 | 6 | 2 | Malawi | Rwanda | Willowmoore Park, Benoni | 16 December 2023 | Won | |
| 134 | Ma Qiancheng | 4 | 9 | 5 | 2 | China | Myanmar | Terdthai Cricket Ground, Bangkok | 30 January 2024 | Won | |
| 135 | Reo Sakurano-Thomas (2/2) | 3.5 | 26 | 6 | 2 | Japan | Thailand | Terdthai Cricket Ground, Bangkok | 2 February 2024 | Won | |
| 136 | Sabaorish Ravichandran (1/2) | 4 | 22 | 5 | 1 | Japan | Hong Kong | Mission Road Ground, Mong Kok | 15 February 2024 | Lost | |
| 137 | Zain Ul Abidin | 3 | 6 | 5 | 2 | Saudi Arabia | Bhutan | Terdthai Cricket Ground, Bangkok | 15 February 2024 | Won | |
| 138 | Rizwan Butt (2/4) | 4 | 12 | 5 | 2 | Bahrain | Tanzania | Bayuemas Oval, Pandamaran | 9 March 2024 | Won | |
| 139 | Nuwan Thushara | 4 | 20 | 5 | 2 | Sri Lanka | Bangladesh | Sylhet International Cricket Stadium, Sylhet | 9 March 2024 | Won | |
| 140 | Salum Jumbe | 3.3 | 10 | 5 | 2 | Tanzania | Nigeria | Achimota Oval B, Accra | 17 March 2024 | Won | |
| 141 | Lucas Oluoch | 4 | 20 | 5 | 1 | Kenya | Uganda | Achimota Oval B, Accra | 17 March 2024 | Lost | |
| 142 | Obed Harvey | 4 | 36 | 5 | 1 | Ghana | Uganda | Achimota Oval B, Accra | 18 March 2024 | Lost | |
| 143 | Pratik Singh Bais | 4 | 14 | 6 | 2 | Mexico | Costa Rica | Los Reyes Polo Club, Guacimal | 14 April 2024 | Won | |
| 144 | Kazuma Kato-Stafford | 3.2 | 7 | 5 | 2 | Japan | Mongolia | Sano International Cricket Ground, Sano | 8 May 2024 | Won | |
| 145 | Dawood Ahmadzai | 4 | 21 | 6 | 2 | France | Malta | Dreux Sport Cricket Club, Dreux | 9 May 2024 | Won | |
| 146 | Charles Hinze | 4 | 6 | 5 | 2 | Japan | Mongolia | Sano International Cricket Ground, Sano | 8 May 2024 | Won | |
| 147 | Samarth Bodha | 4 | 16 | 5 | 1 | Gibraltar | Romania | Moara Vlasiei Cricket Ground, Ilfov County | 25 May 2024 | Won | |
| 148 | Mustafizur Rahman (2/2) | 4 | 10 | 6 | 1 | Bangladesh | United States | Prairie View Cricket Complex, Houston | 25 May 2024 | Won | |
| 149 | Fazalhaq Farooqi | 4 | 9 | 5 | 2 | Afghanistan | Uganda | Providence Stadium, Providence | 3 June 2024 | Won | |
| 150 | Akeal Hosein | 4 | 11 | 5 | 2 | West Indies | Uganda | Providence Stadium, Providence | 8 June 2024 | Won | |
| 151 | Adrian Lascu | 4 | 21 | 5 | 1 | Romania | Portugal | Roma Cricket Ground, Rome | 10 June 2024 | Won | |
| 152 | Manmeet Koli (1/2) | 4 | 28 | 5 | 1 | Romania | Hungary | Roma Cricket Ground, Rome | 13 June 2024 | Won | |
| 153 | Fayaz Khan | 4 | 19 | 5 | 1 | Germany | Norway | Bayer Uerdingen Cricket Ground, Krefeld | 11 July 2024 | Won | |
| 154 | Yasir Ali | 4 | 28 | 6 | 1 | Spain | Croatia | Mladost Cricket Ground, Zagreb | 2 August 2024 | Won | |
| 155 | Charlie Rumistrzewicz (1/2) | 2.5 | 7 | 5 | 1 | Spain | Croatia | Mladost Cricket Ground, Zagreb | 3 August 2024 | Won | |
| 156 | Sebastian Hughes-Pinan | 3.2 | 12 | 5 | 2 | Spain | Croatia | Mladost Cricket Ground, Zagreb | 4 August 2024 | Won | |
| 157 | Williamsing Nalisa | 4 | 16 | 6 | 2 | Vanuatu | Fiji | Faleata Oval 2, Apia | 19 August 2024 | Won | |
| 158 | Saumani Tiai | 3.3 | 27 | 5 | 2 | Samoa | Fiji | Faleata Oval 2, Apia | 21 August 2024 | Won | |
| 159 | Oscar Taylor | 4 | 17 | 5 | 1 | Cook Islands | Vanuatu | Faleata Oval 2, Apia | 21 August 2024 | Won | |
| 160 | Charlie Rumistrzewicz (2/2) | 4 | 18 | 5 | 1 | Spain | Finland | King George V Sports Ground, Castel | 28 August 2024 | Won | |
| 161 | Harsha Bharadwaj | 4 | 3 | 6 | 1 | Singapore | Mongolia | UKM-YSD Cricket Oval, Bangi | 5 September 2024 | Won | |
| 162 | Ramesh Kalimuthu | 4 | 21 | 5 | 1 | Singapore | Kuwait | UKM-YSD Cricket Oval, Bangi | 6 September 2024 | Won | |
| 163 | Matthew Short | 3 | 22 | 5 | 2 | Australia | England | Sophia Gardens, Cardiff | 13 September 2024 | Lost | |
| 164 | Waseem Yaqoob | 4 | 18 | 6 | 2 | Lesotho | Mali | Gymkhana Club Ground, Dar es Salaam | 25 September 2024 | Won | |
| 165 | Moazzam Baig (3/3) | 1.5 | 4 | 5 | 1 | Malawi | Cameroon | University of Dar es Salaam Ground, Dar es Salaam | 25 September 2024 | Won | |
| 166 | Milind Kumar | 4 | 16 | 5 | 1 | United States | Namibia | Wanderers Cricket Ground, Windhoek | 5 October 2024 | Won | |
| 167 | Emile Rukiriza (1/2) | 4 | 11 | 5 | 1 | Rwanda | Malawi | TCA Oval, Blantyre | 9 October 2024 | Won | |
| 168 | Jandre Coetzee | 3 | 10 | 5 | 1 | Thailand | Indonesia | Gelephu International Cricket Ground, Gelephu | 20 October 2024 | Won | |
| 169 | Gerard Mwendwa | 4 | 7 | 5 | 2 | Kenya | Gambia | Gymkhana Club Ground, Nairobi | 22 October 2024 | Won | |
| 170 | Sikandar Raza | 4 | 18 | 5 | 2 | Zimbabwe | Rwanda | Ruaraka Sports Club Ground, Nairobi | 22 October 2024 | Won | |
| 171 | Jobayer Hossen | 4 | 25 | 5 | 1 | Seychelles | Rwanda | Ruaraka Sports Club Ground, Nairobi | 24 October 2024 | Lost | |
| 172 | Varun Chakravarthy (1/2) | 4 | 17 | 5 | 2 | India | South Africa | St George's Park Cricket Ground, Gqeberha | 10 November 2024 | Lost | |
| 173 | Spencer Johnson | 4 | 26 | 5 | 2 | Australia | Pakistan | Sydney Cricket Ground, Sydney | 16 November 2024 | Won | |
| 174 | George Ngegba | 3.4 | 12 | 5 | 2 | Sierra Leone | Ivory Coast | Nigeria Cricket Federation Oval 1, Abuja | 23 November 2024 | Won | |
| 175 | Amir Farooq | 4 | 32 | 5 | 2 | Qatar | Bahrain | West End Park International Cricket Stadium, Doha | 25 November 2024 | Won | |
| 176 | Rizwan Butt (3/4) | 4 | 20 | 5 | 2 | Bahrain | Cambodia | UDST Cricket Ground, Doha | 26 November 2024 | Won | |
| 177 | Ridwan Abdulkareem | 4 | 22 | 6 | 2 | Nigeria | Botswana | Nigeria Cricket Federation Oval 1, Abuja | 28 November 2024 | Won | |
| 178 | Sufiyan Muqeem | 2.4 | 3 | 5 | 1 | Pakistan | Zimbabwe | Queens Sports Club, Bulawayo | 3 December 2024 | Won | |
| 179 | Alpesh Ramjani | 4 | 17 | 5 | 1 | Uganda | Nigeria | Gahanga International Cricket Stadium, Kigali | 6 December 2024 | Won | |
| 180 | Shoaib Rafiq | 4 | 12 | 5 | 2 | Mexico | Brazil | Hurlingham Club Ground, Buenos Aires | 7 December 2024 | Won | |
| 181 | Henry Ssenyondo | 4 | 8 | 5 | 1 | Uganda | Nigeria | Gahanga International Cricket Stadium, Kigali | 8 December 2024 | Won | |
| 182 | Yasar Haroon | 4 | 16 | 5 | 1 | Brazil | Panama | Estadio Belgrano Athletic, Buenos Aires | 12 December 2024 | Won | |
| 183 | Maurice Castillo | 4 | 16 | 6 | 1 | Belize | Panama | Club San Albano, Burzaco | 14 December 2024 | Won | |
| 184 | Lawrence Bonner | 3.5 | 10 | 5 | 1 | Belize | Brazil | Estadio Belgrano Athletic, Buenos Aires | 15 December 2024 | Won | |
| 185 | Hernán Fennell (2/2) | 4 | 14 | 5 | 1 | Argentina | Cayman Islands | Hurlingham Club Ground, Buenos Aires | 15 December 2024 | Lost | |
| 186 | Varun Chakravarthy (2/2) | 4 | 24 | 5 | 1 | India | England | Niranjan Shah Stadium, Rajkot | 28 January 2025 | Lost | |
| 187 | Muhammad Saqlain (1/2) | 4 | 32 | 5 | 1 | Hungary | Austria | Marsa Sports Club, Marsa | 5 February 2025 | Won | |
| 188 | James Neesham | 4 | 22 | 5 | 1 | New Zealand | Pakistan | Wellington Regional Stadium, Wellington | 26 March 2025 | Won | |
| 189 | Ali Sheikh | 3 | 15 | 5 | 1 | United States | Bermuda | Jimmy Powell Oval, George Town | 21 April 2025 | Won | |
| 190 | Waji Ul Hassan | 3 | 9 | 5 | 2 | Saudi Arabia | Thailand | Bayuemas Oval, Pandamaran | 28 April 2025 | Won | |
| 191 | Hasan Ali | 3.2 | 30 | 5 | 2 | Pakistan | Bangladesh | Gaddafi Stadium, Lahore | 28 May 2025 | Won | |
| 192 | Umair Tariq | 3.5 | 32 | 5 | 2 | Austria | Switzerland | Velden Cricket Ground, Latschach | 1 June 2025 | Won | |
| 193 | Gulam Murtaza | 4 | 24 | 5 | 1 | Cambodia | Indonesia | Udayana Cricket Ground, Jimbaran | 15 June 2025 | Won | |
| 194 | Ali Nawaz | 3 | 24 | 5 | 2 | Hungary | Slovenia | GB Oval, Sződliget | 21 June 2025 | Won | |
| 195 | Ibrar Ahmad | 3.3 | 27 | 5 | 2 | Hungary | France | Moara Vlasiei Cricket Ground, Ilfov County | 29 June 2025 | Won | |
| 196 | Anjar Tadarus | 4 | 8 | 5 | 1 | Indonesia | South Korea | Udayana Cricket Ground, Jimbaran | 9 July 2025 | Won | |
| 197 | Harry Manenti | 4 | 31 | 5 | 2 | Italy | Scotland | Sportpark Westvliet, Voorburg | 9 July 2025 | Won | |
| 198 | Rizwan Butt (4/4) | 3.5 | 9 | 6 | 1 | Bahrain | Malawi | TCA Oval, Blantyre | 12 July 2025 | Won | |
| 199 | Nivek Tanner | 4 | 29 | 5 | 1 | Philippines | Indonesia | Udayana Cricket Ground, Jimbaran | 13 July 2025 | Won | |
| 200 | Harsh Venkataram | 4 | 21 | 5 | 2 | Singapore | Samoa | Singapore National Cricket Ground, Singapore | 18 July 2025 | Won | |
| 201 | Muhammad Zuhaib | 3.3 | 21 | 5 | 1 | United Arab Emirates | Nigeria | Entebbe Cricket Oval, Entebbe | 21 July 2025 | Won | |
| 202 | Manmeet Koli (2/2) | 3.5 | 12 | 5 | 1 | Romania | Hungary | GB Oval, Sződliget | 25 July 2025 | Won | |
| 203 | Muhammad Saqlain (2/2) | 3.1 | 8 | 5 | 2 | Hungary | Luxembourg | GB Oval, Sződliget | 25 July 2025 | Won | |
| 204 | Vasu Saini | 3.5 | 17 | 5 | 2 | Romania | Luxembourg | GB Oval, Sződliget | 26 July 2025 | Won | |
| 205 | Mahesh Tambe | 2 | 19 | 5 | 1 | Finland | Estonia | Estonian National Cricket and Rugby Field, Tallinn | 27 July 2025 | Won | |
| 206 | Rameez Khan | 4 | 22 | 5 | 2 | Romania | Czech Republic | Moara Vlasiei Cricket Ground, Ilfov County | 22 August 2025 | Won | |
| 207 | Waqar Zalmai | 2.3 | 17 | 5 | 1 | Austria | Belgium | Velden Cricket Ground, Latschach | 24 August 2025 | Won | |
| 208 | Peter Nedeljkovic | 4 | 20 | 5 | 1 | Serbia | Hungary | GB Oval, Sződliget | 30 August 2025 | Won | |
| 209 | Mohammad Nawaz (1/2) | 4 | 19 | 5 | 2 | Pakistan | Afghanistan | Sharjah Cricket Stadium, Sharjah | 7 September 2025 | Won | |
| 210 | Sandeep Lamichhane (2/2) | 3.5 | 18 | 5 | 2 | Nepal | Qatar | Oman Cricket Academy Ground Turf 1, Al Amarat | 13 October 2025 | Won | |
| 211 | Saad Cheema | 3 | 27 | 5 | 1 | Austria | Romania | Moara Vlasei Cricket Ground, Ilfov County | 18 October 2025 | Won | |
| 212 | Bogdan Dugic | 4 | 28 | 5 | 1 | Serbia | Bulgaria | Happy Valley Ground 2, Episkopi | 1 November 2025 | Lost | |
| 213 | Emile Rukiriza (2/2) | 4 | 15 | 5 | 2 | Rwanda | Sierra Leone | Nigeria Cricket Federation Oval 1, Abuja | 8 December 2025 | Won | |
| 214 | Isaac Okpe | 4 | 25 | 5 | 2 | Nigeria | Zambia | Nigeria Cricket Federation Oval 1, Abuja | 8 December 2025 | Won | |
| 215 | Ali Dawood (1/2) | 4 | 19 | 7 | 2 | Bahrain | Bhutan | Gelephu International Cricket Ground, Gelephu | 11 December 2025 | Won | |
| 216 | Gede Priandana | 1 | 1 | 5 | 2 | Indonesia | Cambodia | Udayana Cricket Ground, Jimbaran | 23 December 2025 | Won | |
| 217 | Sonam Yeshey | 4 | 7 | 8 | 2 | Bhutan | Myanmar | Gelephu International Cricket Ground, Gelephu | 26 December 2025 | Won | |
| 218 | Arshdeep Singh | 4 | 51 | 5 | 2 | India | New Zealand | Greenfield International Stadium, Thiruvananthapuram | 31 January 2026 | Won | |
| 219 | Mohammad Nawaz (2/2) | 4 | 18 | 5 | 2 | Pakistan | Australia | Gaddafi Stadium, Lahore | 1 February 2026 | Won | |
| 220 | Dushmantha Chameera | 4 | 24 | 5 | 1 | Sri Lanka | England | Pallekele International Cricket Stadium, Kandy | 3 February 2026 | Lost | |
| 221 | Romario Shepherd | 3 | 20 | 5 | 2 | West Indies | Scotland | Eden Gardens, Kolkata | 7 February 2026 | Won | |
| 222 | Junaid Siddique | 4 | 35 | 5 | 1 | United Arab Emirates | Canada | Arun Jaitley Cricket Stadium, Delhi | 13 February 2026 | Won | |
| 223 | Declan Suzuki | 4 | 20 | 5 | 2 | Japan | Bhutan | Terdthai Cricket Ground, Bangkok | 27 February 2026 | Won | |
| 224 | Romario Edwards | 4 | 16 | 5 | 1 | Cayman Islands | Mexico | Jimmy Powell Oval, George Town | 9 March 2026 | Won | |
| 225 | Irfan Safi | 4 | 28 | 5 | 1 | Austria | Cyprus | Happy Valley Ground 2, Episkopi | 14 March 2026 | Lost | |
| 226 | Kelvin Thuchila | 4 | 8 | 5 | 1 | Malawi | Eswatini | Achimota Oval B, Accra | 27 March 2026 | Won | |
| 227 | Sumeet Lahiri | 4 | 17 | 5 | 1 | Mexico | Costa Rica | Reforma Athletic Club, Naucalpan | 4 April 2026 | Won | |
| 228 | Hammadullah Shinwari (1/2) | 4 | 7 | 6 | 2 | Finland | Cyprus | Happy Valley Ground, Episkopi | 9 May 2026 | Won | |
| 229 | Hyeon Parsons | 3.5 | 31 | 6 | 1 | South Korea | Fiji | Sano International Cricket Ground, Sano | 13 May 2026 | Won | |
| 230 | Sabaorish Ravichandran (2/2) | 4 | 11 | 5 | 1 | Japan | Samoa | Sano International Cricket Ground, Sano | 16 May 2026 | Won | |
| 231 | Nabil Master | 2.4 | 2 | 6 | 1 | Botswana | Mali | Botswana Cricket Association Oval 1, Gaborone | 24 May 2026 | Won | |
| 232 | Julien Abega | 3.1 | 24 | 5 | 1 | Cameroon | Sierra Leone | Botswana Cricket Association Oval 2, Gaborone | 24 May 2026 | Won | |
| 233 | Samuel Conteh (2/2) | 4 | 23 | 5 | 1 | Sierra Leone | Cameroon | Botswana Cricket Association Oval 2, Gaborone | 24 May 2026 | Lost | |
| 234 | Sachin Gill | 4 | 7 | 7 | 1 | Kenya | Cameroon | Botswana Cricket Association Oval 1, Gaborone | 28 May 2026 | Won | |
| 235 | Shamar Joseph | 4 | 33 | 5 | 1 | West Indies | Sri Lanka | Sabina Park, Kingston | 14 June 2026 | Won | |
| 236 | Sabawoon Davizi | 4 | 9 | 6 | 1 | Czech Republic | Serbia | Vinoř Cricket Ground (Scott Page Field), Prague | 28 June 2026 | Won | |
| 237 | Akshay Wagh | 4 | 17 | 5 | 1 | Austria | Israel | Moara Vlasei Cricket Ground, Ilfov County | 28 July 2026 | Won | |
| 238 | Daniel Jakiel (2/2) | 2 | 9 | 5 | 2 | Malawi | Rwanda | TCA Oval, Blantyre | 14 August 2026 | Won | |
| 239 | Hammadullah Shinwari (2/2) | 4 | 28 | 5 | 2 | Finland | Bulgaria | Tikkurila Cricket Ground, Vantaa | 15 August 2026 | Won | |
| 240 | Mohammad Kamran (2/2) | 4 | 20 | 6 | 2 | Spain | Luxembourg | Tikkurila Cricket Ground, Vantaa | 17 August 2026 | Won | |
| 241 | Vincent Adewoye | 4 | 11 | 5 | 2 | Nigeria | Ghana | Tafawa Balewa Square Cricket Oval, Lagos | 26 September 2026 | Won | |
| 242 | Aamir Lal | 4 | 16 | 5 | 1 | South Korea | Indonesia | Yeonhui Cricket Ground, Incheon | 5 October 2026 | Won | |
| 243 | Mohammed Aslam | 4 | 19 | 5 | 1 | Kuwait | Mongolia | UKM-YSD Cricket Oval, Bangi | 6 October 2026 | Won | |
| 244 | Abdul Majid | 4 | 25 | 5 | 1 | Bahrain | Myanmar | Selangor Turf Club, Seri Kembangan | 8 October 2026 | Won | |
| 245 | Ali Dawood (2/2) | 4 | 5 | 5 | 1 | Bahrain | Mongolia | Selangor Turf Club, Seri Kembangan | 11 October 2026 | Won | |
| 246 | Virandeep Singh | 4 | 14 | 5 | 2 | Malaysia | Singapore | Bayuemas Oval, Pandamaran | 12 October 2026 | Won | |
| 247 | Nopphon Senamontree | 4 | 10 | 5 | 2 | Thailand | Bhutan | Selangor Turf Club, Seri Kembangan | 14 October 2026 | Won | |
| 248 | Ehsan Khan | 4 | 26 | 5 | 2 | Hong Kong | Singapore | Bayuemas Oval, Pandamaran | 14 October 2026 | Won | |
| 249 | Keemo Paul (2/2) | 4 | 41 | 5 | 2 | West Indies | India | Rajiv Gandhi International Cricket Stadium, Hyderabad | 14 October 2026 | Won | |
| 250 | Juma Miyagi | 4 | 7 | 5 | 1 | Uganda | Mozambique | Nigeria Cricket Federation Oval 2, Abuja | 24 October 2026 | Won | |
| 251 | Noor Ahmad | 3.3 | 13 | 5 | 1 | Afghanistan | Zimbabwe | Sharjah Cricket Stadium, Sharjah | 1 November 2026 | Won | |
