= 2023 T20I Nordic Cup =

International cricket tournament

- Dates: 18 – 21 May 2023
- Administrator: Danish Cricket Federation
- Cricket format: 20 overs, Twenty20 International
- Tournament format: Double round-robin
- Host: Denmark
- Champions: Denmark
- Runners-up: Norway
- Participants: 4
- Matches: 12
- Most runs: (Norway) Raza Iqbal (141)
- Most wickets: (Sweden) Shahzeb Choudhry (10) (Finland) Amjad Sher (10) (Norway) Raza Iqbal (10)

The 2023 T20I Nordic Cup was a men's Twenty20 International (T20I) cricket tournament that was played in Denmark in May 2023. The quadrangular tournament was contested by Denmark, Finland, Norway and Sweden. Denmark's last two fixtures were played as non-T20I matches.

== Squads ==
Denmark (Note: Aden Aftab, Bilal Aftab, Taranjit Bharaj, Ehsan Karimi, Delawar Khan, Mansoor Khan, Zameer Khan and Raizul Sawmy also featured for the Denmark "A team".)	Finland	Norway	Sweden
Hamid Shah (c); Saif Ahmad; Lucky Ali; Surya Anand; Saran Aslam; Oliver Hald; Abdul Hashmi (wk); Magnus Kristensen; Nicolaj Laegsgaard; Abdullah Mahmood; Rizwan Mahmood; Saud Munir; Musa Shaheen; Simon Sørensen; Shangeev Thanikaithasan; Anique Uddin; Shakeel Zeb	Nathan Collins (c); Amjad Sher (vc); Akhil Arjunan; ~~Mohammad Asaduzzaman~~; Matias Brasier; Peter Gallagher; Matthew Jenkinson; Parveen Kumar; Raaz Mohammad; Aravind Mohan (wk); Faheem Nellancheri; Jordan O'Brien (wk); Vanraaj Padhaal; Areeb Quadir (wk); Atif Rasheed; ~~Ziaur Rehman~~; Sumit Singh; Mahesh Tambe	Ali Saleem (c); Kuruge Abeyrathna (wk); Chaudhary Akram; Rafaqat Ali; Tafseer Ali; Muhammad Butt; Nouman Butt; Raza Iqbal; Javed Maroofkhail; Junaid Mehmood (wk); Qamar Mushtaque; Vinay Ravi; Saif-Ul Islam; Sher Sahak; Adnan Shnwarei	Shahzeb Choudhry (c); Sami Rahmani (vc); Saeed Ahmed; Choudry Share Ali; Abdul Naser Baluch; Wynand Boshoff (wk); Ajay Mundra; Saad Nawaz; Prashant Shukla; Abdur Rahman Sudais; Zaker Taqawi; Khalid Zahid; Zabiullah Zahid; Abu Zar; Imal Zuwak

== Points table ==
Pos	Team	Pld	W	L	NR	Pts	NRR
1	Denmark	4	3	1	0	6	1.981
2	Norway	5	3	2	0	6	0.457
3	Sweden	5	2	3	0	4	0.052
4	Finland	6	2	4	0	4	−1.572

Source: ESPNcricinfo

== Fixtures ==
18 May 2023
11:00
Scorecard

Norway; 99/9 (20 overs)	v	Denmark; 100/1 (9.5 overs)
Chaudhary Akram 36 (50); Saud Munir 5/21 (4 overs)		Nicolaj Laegsgaard 63* (36); Kuruge Abeyrathna 1/12 (2 overs)

Denmark won by 9 wickets
Svanholm Park, Brøndby
Umpires: Fareedoon Bhatti (Nor) and Allan From (Den)
Player of the match: Nicolaj Laegsgaard (Den)

- Norway won the toss and elected to bat.
- Chaudhary Akram and Nouman Butt (Nor) both made their T20I debuts.
- Saud Munir became the first player for Denmark to take both a hat-trick and a five-wicket haul in men's T20Is.

18 May 2023
15:30
Scorecard

Denmark; 175/5 (20 overs)	v	Finland; 103/8 (20 overs)
Saif Ahmad 66 (45); Amjad Sher 2/25 (4 overs)		Mahesh Tambe 20* (28); Oliver Hald 3/5 (3 overs)

Denmark won by 72 runs
Svanholm Park, Brøndby
Umpires: Fareedoon Bhatti (Nor) and Ashish Saini (Swe)
Player of the match: Saif Ahmad (Den)

- Denmark won the toss and elected to bat.
- Akhil Arjunan and Jordan O'Brien (Fin) both made their T20I debuts.

18 May 2023
15:30
Scorecard

Norway; 183/9 (20 overs)	v	Sweden; 108 (15.4 overs)
Raza Iqbal 64 (42); Zaker Taqawi 4/26 (4 overs)		Abdur Rahman Sudais 42 (38); Raza Iqbal 5/23 (3.4 overs)

Norway won by 75 runs
Solvangs Park, Glostrup
Umpires: Allan From (Den) and Srinidhi Ravindra (Fin)
Player of the match: Raza Iqbal (Nor)

- Norway won the toss and elected to bat.
- Saif-Ul Islam (Nor), Saeeb Ahmed, Choudry Share Ali, Abdul Naser Baluch, Shahzeb Choudhry, Sami Rahmani, Abdur Rahman Sudais, Abu Zar and Zabiullah Zahid (Swe) all made their T20I debuts.
- Raza Iqbal (Nor) took his first five-wicket haul in T20Is.

19 May 2023
11:00
Scorecard

Denmark; 109 (19.2 overs)	v	Sweden; 110/0 (14.4 overs)
Hamid Shah 29 (31); Zaker Taqawi 3/21 (4 overs)		Choudry Share Ali 61* (42)

Sweden won by 10 wickets
Svanholm Park, Brøndby
Umpires: Fareedoon Bhatti (Nor) and Srinidhi Ravindra (Fin)
Player of the match: Choudry Share Ali (Swe)

- Sweden won the toss and elected to field.
- Magnus Kristensen (Den) and Prashant Shukla (Swe) both made their T20I debuts.

19 May 2023
11:00
Scorecard

Norway; 131/7 (20 overs)	v	Finland; 101 (16.5 overs)
Muhammad Butt 45* (46); Akhil Arjunan 2/13 (4 overs)		Faheem Nellancheri 35 (20); Qamar Mushtaque 3/18 (2.5 overs)

Norway won by 30 runs
Solvangs Park, Glostrup
Umpires: Atif Jamal (Den) and Ashish Saini (Swe)
Player of the match: Muhammad Butt (Nor)

- Norway won the toss and elected to bat.
- Faheem Nellancheri and Sumit Singh (Fin) both made their T20I debuts.

19 May 2023
15:30
Scorecard

Finland; 92 (19.5 overs)	v	Denmark; 94/2 (14.5 overs)
Atif Rasheed 30 (26); Hamid Shah 4/19 (3.5 overs)		Shangeev Thanikaithasan 41* (31); Akhil Arjunan 1/22 (3 overs)

Denmark won by 8 wickets
Svanholm Park, Brøndby
Umpires: Fareedoon Bhatti (Nor) and Ashish Saini (Swe)
Player of the match: Hamid Shah (Den)

- Finland won the toss and elected to bat.

19 May 2023
15:30
Scorecard

Sweden; 176/7 (20 overs)	v	Norway; 123 (19.2 overs)
Choudry Share Ali 43 (32); Javed Maroofkhail 2/14 (3 overs)		Kuruge Abeyrathna 25 (29); Khalid Zahid 3/15 (4 overs)

Sweden won by 53 runs
Solvangs Park, Glostrup
Umpires: Atif Jamal (Den) and Srinidhi Ravindra (Fin)
Player of the match: Khalid Zahid (Swe)

- Sweden won the toss and elected to bat.

20 May 2023
11:00
Scorecard

Finland; 106 (19.2 overs)	v	Sweden; 99 (19.2 overs)
Atif Rasheed 29 (27); Shahzeb Choudhry 4/11 (4 overs)		Abdul Naser Baluch 20 (16); Amjad Sher 3/20 (4 overs)

Finland won by 7 runs
Svanholm Park, Brøndby
Umpires: Fareedoon Bhatti (Nor) and Allan From (Den)
Player of the match: Shahzeb Choudhry (Swe)

- Sweden won the toss and elected to field.

20 May 2023
15:30
Scorecard

Denmark A 125/6 (20 overs)	v	Sweden A 59 (14.5 overs)
Rizwan Mahmood 27 (23); Prashant Shukla 2/10 (2 overs)		Abu Zar 17 (24); Raizul Sawmy 3/5 (2 overs)

Denmark A won by 66 runs
Svanholm Park, Brøndby
Umpires: Fareedoon Bhatti (Nor) and Srinidhi Ravindra (Fin)
Player of the match: Zameer Khan (Den)

- Denmark A won the toss and elected to bat.

20 May 2023
15:30
Scorecard

Finland; 102 (16.3 overs)	v	Norway; 106/3 (11.5 overs)
Atif Rasheed 29 (17); Muhammad Butt 3/18 (4 overs)		Raza Iqbal 50 (25); Peter Gallagher 2/18 (4 overs)

Norway won by 7 wickets
Solvangs Park, Glostrup
Umpires: Allan From (Den) and Ashish Saini (Swe)
Player of the match: Raza Iqbal (Nor)

- Finland won the toss and elected to bat.
- Rafaqat Ali (Nor) made his T20I debut.

21 May 2023
10:30
Scorecard

Norway A 115/8 (20 overs)	v	Denmark A 117/2 (13 overs)
Junaid Mehmood 32 (24); Anique Uddin 2/17 (3 overs)		Saran Aslam 62* (35); Qamar Mushtaque 1/15 (3 overs)

Denmark A won by 8 wickets
Svanholm Park, Brøndby
Umpires: Raja Imran Khan (Den) and Ashish Saini (Swe)
Player of the match: Saran Aslam (Den)

- Norway A won the toss and elected to bat.

21 May 2023
10:30
Scorecard

Sweden; 96 (17.4 overs)	v	Finland; 96/9 (20 overs)
Sami Rahmani 22 (23); Raaz Mohammad 3/16 (3.4 overs)		Aravind Mohan 29 (40); Prashant Shukla 4/18 (4 overs)

Match tied
(Finland won the Super Over)
Solvangs Park, Glostrup
Umpires: Fareedoon Bhatti (Nor) and Atif Jamal (Den)
Player of the match: Prashant Shukla (Swe)

- Finland won the toss and elected to field.
- Super Over: Finland 15/0, Sweden 13/1
