= 2027 Men's T20 World Cup Africa Regional Final =

Qualifying tournament for the 2028 T20WC

2027 ICC Men's T20 World Cup Africa Regional Final
- Dates: TBD – 2027
- Administrator: Africa Cricket Association
- Cricket format: Twenty20 International
- Tournament format: Group round-robin
- Host: TBD
- Participants: 6

The 2027 ICC Men's T20 World Cup Africa Regional Final will be a cricket tournament that will form part of the qualification process for the 2028 Men's T20 World Cup. The top two teams will join Namibia as Africa's representatives at the 2028 Men's T20 World Cup Global Qualifier.

South Africa and Zimbabwe qualified directly for the World Cup as two of top eight teams from the previous edition.

== Teams and qualification ==
The tournament will feature six teams, consisting of the top two sides from each sub-regional qualifier.

Teams qualified for the Africa regional final
Method of qualification	Date of qualification	Venue(s)	No. of teams	Qualified teams
Africa Qualifier A	1 June 2026	Botswana	2	Kenya
Africa Qualifier A	1 June 2026	Botswana	2	Rwanda
Africa Qualifier B	29 March 2026	Ghana	2	Ghana
Africa Qualifier B	29 March 2026	Ghana	2	Tanzania
Africa Qualifier C	25 October 2026	Nigeria	2	Nigeria
Africa Qualifier C	25 October 2026	Nigeria	2	Uganda
Total			6	

== Squads ==
Ghana	Kenya	Nigeria	Rwanda	Tanzania	Uganda

== Points table ==
Regional final standings
Pos	Team	Pld	W	L	NR	Pts	NRR	Qualification
1	Ghana	0	0	0	0	0	—	Advance to the global qualifier
2	Kenya	0	0	0	0	0	—	Advance to the global qualifier
3	Nigeria	0	0	0	0	0	—	
4	Rwanda	0	0	0	0	0	—	
5	Tanzania	0	0	0	0	0	—	
6	Uganda	0	0	0	0	0	—	

First match(es) will be played: unknown. Source:
