= 2026 Men's T20 World Cup Africa Sub-regional Qualifier A =

Qualification tournament for the 2028 T20WC in Africa region

2026 ICC Men's T20 World Cup Africa Sub-regional Qualifier A
- Dates: 23 – 30 May 2026
- Administrator: ICC Africa
- Cricket format: Twenty20 International
- Tournament format: Round-robin
- Host: Botswana
- Champions: Rwanda
- Runners-up: Kenya
- Participants: 7
- Matches: 21
- Most runs: (Rwanda) Hamza Khan (288)
- Most wickets: (Kenya) Sachin Gill (17)

The 2026 ICC Men's T20 World Cup Africa Sub-regional Qualifier A was a cricket tournament that formed part of the qualification process for the 2028 Men's T20 World Cup. It was hosted by Botswana in May 2026.

The top two sides: Kenya and Rwanda, advanced to the regional final, where they will be joined by Namibia, who received a bye after participating in the previous T20 World Cup, along with two teams from Sub-regional Qualifier B (Ghana and Tanzania) and two teams yet to advance from Sub-regional Qualifier C.

== Squads ==
Botswana	Cameroon	Ivory Coast	Kenya	Mali	Rwanda	Sierra Leone
Karabo Motlhanka (c, wk); Thatayaone Tshose (vc); Monroux Kasselman; Alfred Kgosiemang; Boemo Khumalo; Dhruv Maisuria; Nabil Master; Valentine Mbazo (wk); Mmoloki Mooketsi; Reginald Nehonde; Katlo Piet; Amirahmed Saiyed; Phemelo Silas; Brandon Van Zyl	Faustin Mpegna (c); Julien Abega (vc); Abdoulaye Aminou; Junior Alembe; Sun Assegon; Roger Atangana; Veron Bomnyuy; Maxwell Fru; Honestly Kinga; Dipita Loic; Appolinaire Mengoumou; Idris Tchakou; Alain Toube (wk); Bruno Toube	Dosso Issiaka (c); Mimi Alex; Kone Aziz; Dje Claude; Pamba Dimitri; Ouattara Djakaridja; Kouassi Hermann; Maiga Ibrahim; Ouattara Issouf (wk); Ouattara Mohamed; Kone Nagnama; Assouan Roger; Gouegouri Roland; Kouakou Wilfried	Dhiren Gondaria (c); Sachin Bhudia; Sachin Gill; Nitish Hirani; Irfan Karim (wk); Peter Langat; Francis Mutua; Gerard Mwendwa; Shem Ngoche; Lucas Oluoch; Rakep Patel; Subham Patel; Vishil Patel; Sukhdeep Singh	Yacouba Konate (c); Lassina Berthe; Babjee Botcha; Mohamed Coulibaly; Goutoub Diaby; Moustapha Diakite; Sanze Kamate; Cheick Keita; Theodore Macalou; Zakaria Makadji (wk); Akshaykumar Prajapati; Vamshi Reddy; Lamissa Sanogo; Shetty Shailesh	Didier Ndikubwimana (c, wk); Martin Akayezu; Zappy Bimenyimana; Yves Cyusa; Daniel Gumyusenge; Jean Iradukunda; Hamza Khan; Oscar Manishimwe; Israel Mugisha; Muhammad Nadir; Isaie Niyomugabo; Ignace Ntirenganya; Emile Rukiriza; David Uwimana	Lansana Lamin (c); Abu Kamara (vc); Chernoh Bah; John Bangura (wk); Raymond Coker; Samuel Conteh; Abass Gbla; Yegbeh Jalloh; John Lassayo; George Sesay; Alusine Turay; Eric Turay; Mohamed Turay; Solomon Williams

== Points table ==
Qualifier A standings
Pos	Team	Pld	W	L	NR	Pts	NRR	Qualification
1	Rwanda	6	6	0	0	12	3.870	Advanced to the regional final
2	Kenya	6	5	1	0	10	4.828	Advanced to the regional final
3	Botswana (H)	6	4	2	0	8	3.785	Eliminated
4	Cameroon	6	3	3	0	6	0.904	Eliminated
5	Sierra Leone	6	2	4	0	4	−0.377	Eliminated
6	Mali	6	1	5	0	2	−4.817	Eliminated
7	Ivory Coast	6	0	6	0	0	−9.065	Eliminated

Source: ESPNcricinfo
(H) Host

== Fixtures ==
23 May 2026
09:30
Scorecard

Cameroon; 107/7 (20 overs)	v	Rwanda; 108/3 (18.4 overs)
Bruno Toube 29 (31); Muhammad Nadir 3/13 (4 overs)		Hamza Khan 60* (54); Alain Toube 1/14 (2 overs)

Rwanda won by 7 wickets
Botswana Cricket Association Oval 1, Gaborone
Umpires: Ewoud Lassen (Nam) and Isaac Oyieko (Ken)
Player of the match: Hamza Khan (Rwa)

- Rwanda won the toss and elected to field.
- Junior Alembe (Cmr) made his T20I debut.

23 May 2026
13:30
Scorecard

Botswana; 166/5 (20 overs)	v	Sierra Leone; 96/7 (20 overs)
Monroux Kasselman 66 (40); Abass Gbla 2/22 (3 overs)		Abu Kamara 25 (30); Katlo Piet 3/11 (4 overs)

Botswana won by 70 runs
Botswana Cricket Association Oval 1, Gaborone
Umpires: Lubabalo Gcuma (SA) and Forster Mutizwa (Zim)
Player of the match: Monroux Kasselman (Bot)

- Sierra Leone won the toss and elected to field.

23 May 2026
13:30
Scorecard

Kenya; 247/5 (20 overs)	v	Mali; 75 (19.1 overs)
Dhiren Gondaria 92 (35); Shetty Shailesh 2/37 (4 overs)		Yacouba Konate 17 (24); Dhiren Gondaria 4/17 (3 overs)

Kenya won by 172 runs
Botswana Cricket Association Oval 2, Gaborone
Umpires: Iknow Chabi (Zim) and Patric Makumbi (Uga)
Player of the match: Dhiren Gondaria (Ken)

- Kenya won the toss and elected to bat.
- Subham Patel (Ken), Babjee Botcha, Akshaykumar Prajapati, Vamshi Reddy and Shetty Shailesh (Mli) all made their T20I debuts.

24 May 2026
09:30
Scorecard

Rwanda; 288/2 (20 overs)	v	Ivory Coast; 17 (15.2 overs)
Hamza Khan 164* (65); Kone Aziz 1/37 (4 overs)		Ouattara Issouf 5 (4); Yves Cyusa 3/1 (2 overs)

Rwanda won by 271 runs
Botswana Cricket Association Oval 1, Gaborone
Umpires: Ravi Angara (Bot) and Lubabalo Gcuma (SA)
Player of the match: Hamza Khan (Rwa)

- Rwanda won the toss and elected to bat.
- Gouegouri Roland (Civ) made his T20I debut.
- Hamza Khan (Rwa) scored his first century in T20Is.

24 May 2026
13:30
Scorecard

Mali; 24 (9.4 overs)	v	Botswana; 25/0 (2.2 overs)
Shetty Shailesh 9 (10); Nabil Master 6/2 (2.4 overs)		Ameer Saiyed 14* (8)

Botswana won by 10 wickets
Botswana Cricket Association Oval 1, Gaborone
Umpires: Iknow Chabi (Zim) and Ewoud Lassen (Nam)
Player of the match: Nabil Master (Bot)

- Mali won the toss and elected to bat.
- Nabil Master (Bot) took his first five-wicket haul in T20Is.

24 May 2026
13:30
Scorecard

Sierra Leone; 64 (12.1 overs)	v	Cameroon; 67/9 (15.4 overs)
Chernoh Bah 14 (5); Julien Abega 5/24 (3.1 overs)		Dipita Loic 22 (17); Samuel Conteh 5/23 (4 overs)

Cameroon won by 1 wicket
Botswana Cricket Association Oval 2, Gaborone
Umpires: Forster Mutizwa (Zim) and Justine Muzungu (Bot)
Player of the match: Julien Abega (Cmr)

- Cameroon won the toss and elected to field.
- Eric Turay (Sle) made his T20I debut.
- Julien Abega (Cmr) became the first player for Cameroon to take a five-wicket haul in men's T20Is.

25 May 2026
09:30
Scorecard

Kenya; 101/9 (20 overs)	v	Rwanda; 102/8 (17.3 overs)
Sachin Gill 33* (24); Muhammad Nadir 3/8 (4 overs)		Martin Akayezu 38 (21); Sachin Gill 2/10 (4 overs)

Rwanda won by 2 wickets
Botswana Cricket Association Oval 1, Gaborone
Umpires: Lubabalo Gcuma (SA) and Justine Muzungu (Bot)
Player of the match: Martin Akayezu (Rwa)

- Kenya won the toss and elected to bat.

25 May 2026
09:30
Scorecard

Botswana; 149/5 (20 overs)	v	Cameroon; 78/8 (20 overs)
Phemelo Silas 43 (41); Dipita Loic 2/25 (4 overs)		Alain Toube 46 (35); Mmoloki Mooketsi 3/3 (4 overs)

Botswana won by 71 runs
Botswana Cricket Association Oval 2, Gaborone
Umpires: Patric Makumbi (Uga) and Isaac Oyieko (Zim)
Player of the match: Mmoloki Mooketsi (Bot)

- Botswana won the toss and elected to bat.

25 May 2026
13:30
Scorecard

Ivory Coast; 78/5 (20 overs)	v	Mali; 79/4 (13.3 overs)
Kouakou Wilfried 18 (41); Akshaykumar Prajapati 2/14 (4 overs)		Theodore Macalou 28* (36); Mimi Alex 2/14 (4 overs)

Mali won by 6 wickets
Botswana Cricket Association Oval 2, Gaborone
Umpires: Ravi Angara (Bot) and Forster Mutizwa (Zim)
Player of the match: Theodore Macalou (Mli)

- Mali won the toss and elected to field.
- Kouassi Hermann (Civ) made his T20I debut.
- This was first win for Mali in T20Is.

26 May 2026
09:30
Scorecard

Mali; 49 (18.1 overs)	v	Rwanda; 53/2 (5.2 overs)
Sanze Kamate 17* (20); Zappy Bimenyimana 3/2 (4 overs)		Didier Ndikubwimana 24 (15); Akshaykumar Prajapati 1/4 (2 overs)

Rwanda won by 8 wickets
Botswana Cricket Association Oval 2, Gaborone
Umpires: Ravi Angara (Bot) and Iknow Chabi (Zim)
Player of the match: Zappy Bimenyimana (Rwa)

- Rwanda won the toss and elected to field.

26 May 2026
13:30
Scorecard

Kenya; 135/5 (20 overs)	v	Sierra Leone; 97/9 (20 overs)
Sachin Bhudia 43* (41); Samuel Conteh 2/25 (4 overs)		George Sesay 26* (25); Sachin Gill 4/16 (4 overs)

Kenya won by 38 runs
Botswana Cricket Association Oval 1, Gaborone
Umpires: Patric Makumbi (Uga) and Justine Muzungu (Bot)
Player of the match: Sachin Gill (Ken)

- Sierra Leone won the toss and elected to field.

26 May 2026
13:30
Scorecard

Cameroon; 183/8 (20 overs)	v	Ivory Coast; 31 (17.2 overs)
Dipita Loic 39 (29); Kone Aziz 2/24 (4 overs)		Dje Claude 8 (14); Roger Atangana 3/6 (4 overs); Appolinaire Mengoumou 3/6 (4 overs)

Cameroon won by 152 runs
Botswana Cricket Association Oval 2, Gaborone
Umpires: Lubabalo Gcuma (SA) and Isaac Oyieko (Ken)
Player of the match: Roger Atangana (Cmr)

- Cameroon won the toss and elected to bat.

28 May 2026
09:30
Scorecard

Botswana; 255/3 (20 overs)	v	Ivory Coast; 24 (8.3 overs)
Karabo Motlhanka 112* (57); Dje Claude 1/47 (4 overs)		Mimi Alex 5 (6); Katlo Piet 3/2 (2 overs)

Botswana won by 231 runs
Botswana Cricket Association Oval 1, Gaborone
Umpires: Ewoud Lassen (Nam) and Forster Mutizwa (Zim)
Player of the match: Karabo Motlhanka (Bot)

- Botswana won the toss and elected to bat.
- Karabo Motlhanka and Monroux Kasselman (Bot) both scored their first century in T20Is.

28 May 2026
09:30
Scorecard

Sierra Leone; 88 (19.3 overs)	v	Rwanda; 89/2 (15 overs)
Lansana Lamin 16 (9); Ignace Ntirenganya 3/17 (3.3 overs)		Isae Niyomugabo 36* (33); George Sesay 1/8 (3 overs)

Rwanda won by 8 wickets
Botswana Cricket Association Oval 2, Gaborone
Umpires: Patric Makumbi (Uga) and Isaac Oyieko (Zim)
Player of the match: Ignace Ntirenganya (Rwa)

- Rwanda won the toss and elected to field.

28 May 2026
13:30
Scorecard

Cameroon; 42 (11 overs)	v	Kenya; 43/0 (2.2 overs)
Alain Toube 28 (28); Sachin Gill 7/7 (4 overs)		Subham Patel 21* (11)

Kenya won by 10 wickets
Botswana Cricket Association Oval 1, Gaborone
Umpires: Ravi Angara (Bot) and Iknow Chabi (Zim)
Player of the match: Sachin Gill (Ken)

- Kenya won the toss and elected to field.
- Sachin Gill (Ken) took his first five-wicket haul in T20Is.

29 May 2026
09:30
Scorecard

Cameroon; 159/6 (20 overs)	v	Mali; 69 (16.1 overs)
Alain Toube 41 (21); Lamissa Sanogo 3/27 (3 overs)		Vamshi Reddy 18 (32); Julien Abega 3/13 (3.1 overs)

Cameroon won by 90 runs
Botswana Cricket Association Oval 1, Gaborone
Umpires: Ravi Angara (Bot) and Forster Mutizwa (Zim)
Player of the match: Bruno Toube (Cmr)

- Cameroon won the toss and elected to bat.

29 May 2026
09:30
Scorecard

Ivory Coast; 53/8 (20 overs)	v	Sierra Leone; 54/1 (5.2 overs)
Ouattara Issouf 9 (35); Raymond Coker 4/7 (4 overs)		Yegbeh Jalloh 25* (14); Kone Aziz 1/27 (3 overs)

Sierra Leone won by 9 wickets
Botswana Cricket Association Oval 2, Gaborone
Umpires: Ewoud Lassen (Nam) and Justine Muzungu (Bot)
Player of the match: Raymond Coker (Sle)

- Ivory Coast won the toss and elected to bat.

29 May 2026
13:30
Scorecard

Kenya; 193/3 (20 overs)	v	Botswana; 131/8 (20 overs)
Sachin Bhudia 77* (41); Brandon van Zyl 1/40 (4 overs)		Nabil Master 35* (28); Shem Ngoche 3/20 (4 overs)

Kenya won by 62 runs
Botswana Cricket Association Oval 2, Gaborone
Umpires: Iknow Chabi (Zim) and Lubabalo Gcuma (SA)
Player of the match: Sachin Bhudia (Ken)

- Kenya won the toss and elected to bat.

30 May 2026
09:30
Scorecard

Mali; 97/9 (20 overs)	v	Sierra Leone; 99/4 (12.1 overs)
Vamshi Reddy 39 (41); George Sesay 3/6 (4 overs)		Eric Turay 35* (31); Shetty Shailesh 1/15 (2 overs)

Sierra Leone won by 6 wickets
Botswana Cricket Association Oval 1, Gaborone
Umpires: Patric Makumbi (Uga) and Isaac Oyieko (Ken)
Player of the match: George Sesay (Sle)

- Mali won the toss and elected to bat.

30 May 2026
09:30
Scorecard

Ivory Coast; 18 (12.3 overs)	v	Kenya; 19/1 (1.4 overs)
Dje Claude 5 (10); Gerard Mwendwa 4/2 (4 overs)		Sukhdeep Singh 10* (4); Ouattara Djakaridja 1/8 (0.4 overs)

Kenya won by 9 wickets
Botswana Cricket Association Oval 2, Gaborone
Umpires: Iknow Chabi (Zim) and Ewoud Lassen (Nam)
Player of the match: Gerard Mwendwa (Ken)

- Kenya won the toss and elected to field.

30 May 2026
13:30
Scorecard

Rwanda; 117/8 (20 overs)	v	Botswana; 115/8 (20 overs)
Hamza Khan 23 (23); Brandon van Zyl 3/23 (4 overs)		Karabo Motlhanka 40 (38); Martin Akayezu 2/24 (4 overs)

Rwanda won by 2 runs
Botswana Cricket Association Oval 1, Gaborone
Umpires: Lubabalo Gcuma (SA) and Forster Mutizwa (Zim)
Player of the match: Martin Akayezu (Rwa)

- Rwanda won the toss and elected to bat.

== See also ==
- 2026 Men's T20 World Cup Africa Sub-regional Qualifier B
- 2026 Men's T20 World Cup Africa Sub-regional Qualifier C
