= 2024 Thailand Quadrangular Series =

International cricket tournament

- Dates: 12 – 16 February 2024
- Administrator: Cricket Association of Thailand
- Cricket format: Twenty20 International
- Tournament format(s): Round-robin and final
- Host: Thailand
- Champions: Saudi Arabia
- Runners-up: Thailand
- Participants: 4
- Matches: 8
- Most runs: (Saudi Arabia) Kashif Siddique (163)
- Most wickets: (Saudi Arabia) Usman Khalid (9)

The 2024 Thailand Quadrangular Series was a Twenty20 International (T20I) cricket tournament that took place in Thailand in February 2024. The participating teams were the hosts Thailand as well as Bhutan, Maldives and Saudi Arabia. All fours teams were already in Thailand after having participated in the 2024 ACC Men's Challenger Cup, which ended on 11 February 2024.

== Squads ==
Bhutan	Maldives	Saudi Arabia	Thailand
Thinley Jamtsho (c); Ranjung Mikyo Dorji (vc); Manoj Adhikari (wk); Namgang Chejay (wk); Tashi Chopel; Jigme Dorji; Karma Dorji; Tashi Dorji; Sherab Loday; Tashi Phuntsho; Suprit Pradhan; Tenjin Rabgey; Namgay Thinley; Ngawang Thinley; Tenzin Wangchuk; Sonam Yeshey	Hassan Rasheed (c); Umar Adam; Ismail Ali; Mohamed Azzam (wk); Azyan Farhath; Ibrahim Hassan; Shaof Hassan (wk); Mohamed Ishmath; Nazwan Ismail; Adam Khalaf; Rasheed Rassam; Ibrahim Rizan; Kaushal Rodrigo; Mohamed Sanoor	Hisham Sheikh (c); Ishtiaq Ahmad; Manan Ali (wk); Atif-Ur-Rehman; Haseeb Ghafoor (wk); Usman Khalid; Faisal Khan; Usman Najeeb; Shahzaib; Kashif Siddique; Zain Ul Abidin; Waji Ul Hassan; Waqar Ul Hassan; Abdul Waheed; Imran Yousaf	Austin Lazarus (c); Chaloemwong Chatphaisan; Jandre Coetzee; Phanuwat Desungnoen; Sorawat Desungnoen; Daniel Jacobs; Sarawut Maliwan; Khanitson Namchaikul; Narawit Nuntarach; Chanchai Pengkumta; Robert Raina; Yodsak Saranonnakkun; Nopphon Senamontree; Phiriyapong Suanchuai (wk); Mukesh Thakur; Akshaykumar Yadav (wk)

== Round-robin ==
=== Points table ===
Pos	Team	Pld	W	L	NR	Pts	NRR	Qualification
1	Saudi Arabia	3	3	0	0	6	5.044	Advanced to the final
2	Thailand	3	2	1	0	4	2.192	Advanced to the final
3	Maldives	3	1	2	0	2	−2.011	Advanced to the 3rd place play-off
4	Bhutan	3	0	3	0	0	−5.968	Advanced to the 3rd place play-off

Source: ESPNcricinfo

=== Fixtures ===
12 February 2024
09:30
Scorecard

Bhutan; 70 (18 overs)	v	Thailand; 72/0 (6.5 overs)
Tenzin Wangchuk 18* (21); Sarawut Maliwan 3/9 (3 overs)		Chaloemwong Chatphaisan 35* (20)

Thailand won by 10 wickets
Terdthai Cricket Ground, Bangkok
Umpires: Ashwani Kumar Rana (Tha) and KB Suresh (Tha)
Player of the match: Sarawut Maliwan (Tha)

- Bhutan won the toss and elected to bat.

12 February 2024
13:30
Scorecard

Saudi Arabia; 186/6 (20 overs)	v	Maldives; 88/8 (20 overs)
Kashif Siddique 51 (37); Umar Adam 2/35 (4 overs)		Azyan Farhath 44 (50); Hisham Sheikh 2/11 (3 overs)

Saudi Arabia won by 98 runs
Terdthai Cricket Ground, Bangkok
Umpires: Arif Ansari (Tha) and Tauseef Khalid (Tha)
Player of the match: Kashif Siddique (Sau)

- Saudi Arabia won the toss and elected to bat.

13 February 2024
09:30
Scorecard

Thailand; 112/7 (20 overs)	v	Saudi Arabia; 115/5 (16.1 overs)
Austin Lazarus 51 (38); Usman Khalid 2/13 (2 overs)		Abdul Waheed 58* (38); Khanitson Namchaikul 2/15 (3 overs)

Saudi Arabia won by 5 wickets
Terdthai Cricket Ground, Bangkok
Umpires: Arif Ansari (Tha) and KB Suresh (Tha)
Player of the match: Abdul Waheed (Sau)

- Saudi Arabia won the toss and elected to field.

13 February 2024
13:30
Scorecard

Bhutan; 115/6 (20 overs)	v	Maldives; 119/1 (14.3 overs)
Suprit Pradhan 28 (29); Mohamed Ishmath 2/20 (4 overs)		Azyan Farhath 39* (43); Sonam Yeshey 1/13 (3 overs)

Maldives won by 9 wickets
Terdthai Cricket Ground, Bangkok
Umpires: Tauseef Khalid (Tha) and Ashwani Kumar Rana (Tha)
Player of the match: Umar Adam (Mdv)

- Bhutan won the toss and elected to bat.

15 February 2024
09:30
Scorecard

Maldives; 105 (18.3 overs)	v	Thailand; 109/2 (13 overs)
Azyan Farhath 19 (23); Nopphon Senamontree 3/8 (4 overs)		Akshaykumar Yadav 79* (40); Azyan Farhath 1/12 (2 overs)

Thailand won by 8 wickets
Terdthai Cricket Ground, Bangkok
Umpires: Arif Ansari (Tha) and Ashwani Kumar Rana (Tha)
Player of the match: Akshaykumar Yadav (Tha)

- Thailand won the toss and elected to field.
- Wiraphan Ngowhuad (Tha) made his T20I debut.

15 February 2024
13:30
Scorecard

Saudi Arabia; 221/3 (20 overs)	v	Bhutan; 55 (14.2 overs)
Waji Ul Hassan 115* (62); Sonam Yeshey 1/30 (4 overs)		Thinley Jamtsho 17 (21); Zain Ul Abidin 5/6 (3 overs)

Saudi Arabia won by 166 runs
Terdthai Cricket Ground, Bangkok
Umpires: Tauseef Khalid (Tha) and KB Suresh (Tha)
Player of the match: Waji Ul Hassan (Sau)

- Bhutan won the toss and elected to field.
- Tashi Chopel and Tashi Dorji (Bhu) both made their T20I debuts.
- Waji Ul Hassan became the first player for Saudi Arabia to score a century in men's T20Is.
- Zain Ul Abidin (Sau) became the first player for Saudi Arabia to take a five-wicket haul in men's T20Is.

== Third place play-off ==
16 February 2024
13:30
Scorecard

Maldives; 138/6 (20 overs)	v	Bhutan; 141/6 (19.2 overs)
Umar Adam 50 (34); Suprit Pradhan 2/17 (3 overs)		Thinley Jamtsho 64 (42); Umar Adam 3/20 (4 overs)

Bhutan won by 4 wickets
Terdthai Cricket Ground, Bangkok
Umpires: Tauseef Khalid (Tha) and Jeayasooriyam Sanjeev (Tha)
Player of the match: Thinley Jamtsho (Bhu)

- Maldives won the toss and elected to bat.
- Adam Khalaf (Mdv) made his T20I debut.

== Final ==
16 February 2024
09:30
Scorecard

Thailand; 104/9 (20 overs)	v	Saudi Arabia; 108/2 (11.2 overs)
Akshaykumar Yadav 28 (28); Usman Khalid 4/28 (4 overs)		Faisal Khan 47* (36); Khanitson Namchaikul 1/12 (2 overs); Robert Raina 1/12 (2 overs)

Saudi Arabia won by 8 wickets
Terdthai Cricket Ground, Bangkok
Umpires: Arif Ansari (Tha) and KB Suresh (Tha)
Player of the match: Usman Khalid (Sau)

- Saudi Arabia won the toss and elected to field.
