= 2022 Germany Tri-Nation Series =

International cricket tournament

- Date: 9–12 June 2022
- Location: Germany
- Result: Germany won the tournament
Teams
Austria	Germany	Sweden
Captains
Razmal Shigiwal	Venkatraman Ganesan	Abhijit Venkatesh
Most runs
Iqbal Hossain (132)	Talha Khan (103)	Umar Nawaz (103)
Most wickets
Abdullah Akbarjan (9)	Walter Behr (9)	Zaker Taqawi (9)

The 2022 Germany Tri-Nation Series was a Twenty20 International (T20I) cricket tournament that was held in Germany from 9 to 12 June 2022. The participating teams were the hosts Germany, along with Austria and Sweden, and all matches were played at the Bayer Uerdingen Cricket Ground in Krefeld.

Germany and Austria each won three of their four round-robin matches to progress to the final, where the Germans won by three wickets with two balls to spare.

== Squads ==
Austria	Germany	Sweden
Razmal Shigiwal (c); Mirza Ahsan; Abdullah Akbarjan; Arsalan Arif (wk); Abrar Bilal (wk); Mehar Cheema (wk); Itibarshah Deedar; Iqbal Hossain; Aqib Iqbal; Shahil Momin; Amit Nathwani; Quinton Norris; Armaan Randhawa; Jaweed Sadran; Mark Simpson-Parker; Ahsan Yousuf; Sahel Zadran; Bilal Zalmai	Venkatraman Ganesan (c); Ghulam Ahmadi; Vaseekaran Aritharan; Walter Behr; Elam Bharathi; Dylan Blignaut; Rajesh Chinnasamy; Shoaib Khan; Talha Khan; Sajid Liaqat; Sachin Mandy (wk); Nooruddin Mujadady; Nilay Patel; Abdul Shakoor; Harish Srinivasan (wk); Abdul Stanikzai; Ahmed Wardak; Muslim Yar	Abhijit Venkatesh (c); Umar Nawaz (vc); Baz Ayubi; Abdul Naser Baluch; Wynand Boshoff (wk); Faseeh Choudary; Tasaduq Hussain; Liam Karlsson; Azam Khalil; Sami Khalil; Hamid Mahmood; Lemar Momand; Zaker Taqawi; Khalid Zahid; Ismaeel Zia (wk)

== Round-robin ==
=== Points Table ===
Pos	Team	Pld	W	L	NR	Pts	NRR
1	Germany	4	3	1	0	6	0.781
2	Austria	4	3	1	0	6	−0.152
3	Sweden	4	0	4	0	0	−0.626

Source: ESPN Cricinfo

Advanced to the final

=== Fixtures ===
9 June 2022
11:30
Scorecard

Germany; 135/7 (19 overs)	v	Austria; 81 (15.4 overs)
Dylan Blignaut 43 (32); Jaweed Sadran 3/28 (3 overs)		Iqbal Hossain 33 (19); Walter Behr 3/12 (4 overs)

Germany won by 54 runs
Bayer Uerdingen Cricket Ground, Krefeld
Umpires: Sunil Gowda (Ger) and Mark Jameson (Ger)
Player of the match: Dylan Blignaut (Ger)

- Austria won the toss and elected to field.
- The match was reduced to 19 overs per side due to rain.
- Walter Behr, Sachin Mandy and Abdul Stanikzai (Ger) all made their T20I debuts.

9 June 2022
16:00
Scorecard

Sweden; 93 (20 overs)	v	Germany; 95/6 (17.4 overs)
Umar Nawaz 56 (49); Venkatraman Ganesan 3/11 (4 overs)		Sachin Mandy 29 (34); Hamid Mahmood 3/10 (3 overs)

Germany won by 4 wickets
Bayer Uerdingen Cricket Ground, Krefeld
Umpires: Mark Jameson (Ger) and Vinay Malhotra (Ger)
Player of the match: Venkatraman Ganesan (Ger)

- Germany won the toss and elected to field.
- Tasaduq Hussain, Azam Khalil, Sami Khalil, Hamid Mahmood, Umar Nawaz and Zaker Taqawi (Swe) all made their T20I debuts.

10 June 2022
11:30
Scorecard

Austria; 141/9 (20 overs)	v	Germany; 103 (18.4 overs)
Razmal Shigiwal 39 (35); Dylan Blignaut 2/22 (4 overs)		Talha Khan 31 (34); Aqib Iqbal 3/18 (4 overs)

Austria won by 38 runs
Bayer Uerdingen Cricket Ground, Krefeld
Umpires: Sunil Gowda (Ger) and Vinay Malhotra (Ger)
Player of the match: Aqib Iqbal (Aut)

- Austria won the toss and elected to bat.

10 June 2022
16:00
Scorecard

Austria; 124/9 (20 overs)	v	Sweden; 121 (19.2 overs)
Shahil Momin 43 (43); Liam Karlsson 3/25 (4 overs)		Umar Nawaz 22 (18); Abdullah Akbarjan 3/16 (3.2 overs)

Austria won by 3 runs
Bayer Uerdingen Cricket Ground, Krefeld
Umpires: Mark Jameson (Ger) and Vinay Malhotra (Ger)
Player of the match: Abdullah Akbarjan (Aut)

- Sweden won the toss and elected to field.
- Armaan Randhawa (Aut) and Ismaeel Zia (Swe) both made their T20I debuts.

11 June 2022
11:30
Scorecard

Austria; 133/7 (20 overs)	v	Sweden; 132/6 (20 overs)
Iqbal Hossain 57 (45); Liam Karlsson 1/7 (2 overs)		Wynand Boshoff 40 (36); Iqbal Hossain 3/22 (4 overs)

Austria won by 1 run
Bayer Uerdingen Cricket Ground, Krefeld
Umpires: Sunil Gowda (Ger) and Arun Kumar (Ger)
Player of the match: Iqbal Hossain (Aut)

- Sweden won the toss and elected to field.
- Faseeh Choudary (Swe) made his T20I debut.

11 June 2022
16:00
Scorecard

Germany; 151/8 (20 overs)	v	Sweden; 122/8 (20 overs)
Talha Khan 58 (45); Zaker Taqawi 5/25 (4 overs)		Hamid Mahmood 41 (41); Ghulam Ahmadi 3/21 (4 overs)

Germany won by 29 runs
Bayer Uerdingen Cricket Ground, Krefeld
Umpires: Jason Flannery (Ger) and Vinay Malhotra (Ger)
Player of the match: Talha Khan (Ger)

- Germany won the toss and elected to bat.
- Vaseekaran Aritharan (Ger) made his T20I debut.
- Zaker Taqawi (Swe) took his first five-wicket haul in T20Is.

== Final ==
12 June 2022
10:00
Scorecard

Austria; 122/7 (20 overs)	v	Germany; 125/7 (19.4 overs)
Aqib Iqbal 42* (30); Walter Behr 3/17 (4 overs)		Sachin Mandy 34 (32); Amit Nathwani 3/21 (4 overs)

Germany won by 3 wickets
Bayer Uerdingen Cricket Ground, Krefeld
Umpires: Arun Kumar (Ger) and Vinay Malhotra (Ger)
Player of the match: Walter Behr (Ger)

- Austria won the toss and elected to bat.
