= 2023 Malaysia Tri-Nation Series =

- Date: 19–24 September 2023
- Location: Malaysia
- Result: Papua New Guinea won the series
Teams
Hong Kong	Malaysia	Papua New Guinea
Captains
Nizakat Khan	Ahmad Faiz	Assad Vala
Most runs
Babar Hayat (147)	Virandeep Singh (140)	Assad Vala (100)
Most wickets
Nasrulla Rana (7)	Virandeep Singh (6); Vijay Unni (6)	Charles Amini (8); John Kariko (8)

The 2023 Malaysia Tri-Nation Series was a Twenty20 International (T20I) cricket series which took place in Malaysia in September 2023. The participating teams were the hosts Malaysia, along with Hong Kong and Papua New Guinea. The venue for the series was the Bayuemas Oval in Klang. Papua New Guinea won the series by remaining unbeaten in all of their matches.

== Squads ==
Hong Kong	Malaysia	Papua New Guinea
Nizakat Khan (c); Niaz Ali; Mohammad Ghazanfar; Babar Hayat; Akbar Khan; Anas Khan; Ehsan Khan; Hamed Khan; Muhammad Khan (wk); Shiv Mathur (wk); Adil Mehmood; Hassan Khan Mohammad; Nasrulla Rana; Ayush Shukla; Mohammad Waheed; Shahid Wasif	Ahmad Faiz (c); Muhammad Amir; Syed Aziz (wk); Ainool Hafizs (wk); Khizar Hayat; Rizwan Haider; Syazrul Idrus; Amir Khan; Aslam Khan; Sharvin Muniandy; Pavandeep Singh; Virandeep Singh (wk); Connor Smith; Vijay Unni; Zubaidi Zulkifle	Assad Vala (c); Charles Amini; Michael Charlie; Kiplin Doriga (wk); Riley Hekure; Hiri Hiri; Semo Kamea; John Kariko; Alei Nao; Nosaina Pokana; Lega Siaka; Tony Ura; Norman Vanua

== Points table ==
Pos	Team	Pld	W	L	NR	Pts	NRR
1	Papua New Guinea	4	4	0	0	8	1.482
2	Malaysia	4	2	2	0	4	0.819
3	Hong Kong	4	0	4	0	0	−1.974

Source: ESPNcricinfo

== Fixtures ==
19 September 2023
10:30
Scorecard

Malaysia; 181/8 (20 overs)	v	Hong Kong; 79 (19 overs)
Syed Aziz 65 (34); Mohammad Ghazanfar 3/22 (4 overs)		Babar Hayat 22 (20); Virandeep Singh 4/10 (4 overs)

Malaysia won by 102 runs
Bayuemas Oval, Pandamaran
Umpires: Nasir Ali (Mas) and Viswanadan Kalidas (Mas)
Player of the match: Virandeep Singh (Mas)

- Hong Kong won the toss and elected to field.
- Akbar Khan and Shiv Mathur (HK) both made their T20I debuts.

20 September 2023
10:30
Scorecard

Malaysia; 152/9 (20 overs)	v	Papua New Guinea; 108/1 (9.4 overs)
Ahmad Faiz 49 (36); Alei Nao 3/26 (4 overs)		Tony Ura 62 (33); Conor Smith 1/15 (1.4 overs)

Papua New Guinea won by 45 runs (DLS method)
Bayuemas Oval, Pandamaran
Umpires: Nasir Ali (Mas) and Viswanadan Kalidas (Mas)
Player of the match: Tony Ura (PNG)

- Malaysia won the toss and elected to bat.
- No further play was possible due to rain.

21 September 2023
10:30
Scorecard

Papua New Guinea; 163/5 (20 overs)	v	Hong Kong; 141/9 (20 overs)
Assad Vala 45 (35); Ehsan Khan 1/18 (4 overs)		Babar Hayat 62 (49); Charles Amini 2/15 (4 overs)

Papua New Guinea won by 22 runs
Bayuemas Oval, Pandamaran
Umpires: Nasir Ali (Mas) and Viswanadan Kalidas (Mas)
Player of the match: Babar Hayat (HK)

- Hong Kong won the toss and elected to field.
- Niaz Ali, Muhammad Khan and Mohammad Waheed (HK) all made their T20I debuts.

22 September 2023
10:30
Scorecard

Malaysia; 149/6 (20 overs)	v	Hong Kong; 126/7 (20 overs)
Virandeep Singh 84* (59); Anas Khan 3/29 (4 overs)		Babar Hayat 49 (35); Virandeep Singh 2/18 (4 overs); Khizar Hayat 2/18 (4 overs)

Malaysia won by 23 runs
Bayuemas Oval, Pandamaran
Umpires: Rudy Ismandy (Mas) and Viswanadan Kalidas (Mas)
Player of the match: Virandeep Singh (Mas)

- Malaysia won the toss and elected to bat.

23 September 2023
10:30
Scorecard

Malaysia; 81 (17.5 overs)	v	Papua New Guinea; 82/6 (16.2 overs)
Syed Aziz 22 (19); John Kariko 4/11 (3.5 overs)		Lega Siaka 43* (33); Muhammad Amir 3/22 (3.2 overs)

Papua New Guinea won by 4 wickets
Bayuemas Oval, Pandamaran
Umpires: Viswanadan Kalidas (Mas) and Loganathan Poobalan (Mas)
Player of the match: John Kariko (PNG)

- Malaysia won the toss and elected to bat.
- Michael Charlie (PNG) made his T20I debut.

24 September 2023
10:30
Scorecard

Hong Kong; 89/9 (20 overs)	v	Papua New Guinea; 90/9 (18.4 overs)
Ehsan Khan 21* (27); Charles Amini 2/15 (4 overs)		Lega Siaka 21 (15); Nasrulla Rana 6/12 (4 overs)

Papua New Guinea won by 1 wicket
Bayuemas Oval, Pandamaran
Umpires: Viswanadan Kalidas (Mas) and Loganathan Poobalan (Mas)
Player of the match: Nasrulla Rana (HK)

- Papua New Guinea won the toss and elected to field.
- Nasrulla Rana (HK) took his first five-wicket haul in T20Is.
