= South African cricket team in England in 2022 =

International cricket tour

	England	South Africa
- Dates: 19 July – 12 September 2022
Captains	Ben Stokes (Tests); Jos Buttler (ODIs & T20Is)	Dean Elgar (Tests); Keshav Maharaj (ODIs); David Miller (T20Is)

Test series
- Result: England won the 3-match series 2–1
Most runs	Ollie Pope (179)	Sarel Erwee (127)
Most wickets	Stuart Broad (14)	Kagiso Rabada (14)
- Player of the series: Ben Stokes (Eng); Kagiso Rabada (SA)

One Day International series
- Results: 3-match series drawn 1–1
Most runs	Jonny Bairstow (91)	Rassie van der Dussen (160)
Most wickets	Adil Rashid (4)	Anrich Nortje (6)
- Player of the series: Rassie van der Dussen (SA)

Twenty20 International series
- Results: South Africa won the 3-match series 2–1
Most runs	Jonny Bairstow (147)	Reeza Hendricks (180)
Most wickets	Richard Gleeson (4)	Tabraiz Shamsi (8)
- Player of the series: Reeza Hendricks (SA)

The South Africa cricket team toured England from July to September 2022 to play three Test matches, three One Day International (ODI) and three Twenty20 International (T20I) matches. The Test matches formed part of the 2021–2023 ICC World Test Championship. In addition to the matches against England, South Africa had also played two T20I matches against the Ireland cricket team in Bristol.

In November 2021, the England and Wales Cricket Board (ECB) announced that Yorkshire County Cricket Club had been suspended from hosting international matches, following the racism experienced by Azeem Rafiq. Headingley was originally named as the venue for the third ODI. In January 2022, the ECB set Yorkshire the deadline of spring 2022 to meet certain conditions to regain their international status for the match, with the suspension being lifted the following month.

At the end of June 2022, South Africa named their squads for the tour. Their limited overs captain Temba Bavuma was ruled out of the tour due to injury, with Keshav Maharaj and David Miller named as the captains of their ODI and T20I squads respectively. On 18 July 2022, England's Ben Stokes announced that he would retire from ODI cricket following the first match of the series, citing the physical and mental demands of playing all three formats.

South Africa won the opening ODI match by 62 runs, after they had made their highest team total in the format in England. The second ODI was reduced to 29 overs per side due to rain, with England winning the match by 118 runs. South Africa were bowled out for 83 runs, their joint-lowest total against England in an ODI match. The third ODI finished as a no result after only 27.4 overs of play was possible, with the series drawn 1–1.

England won the opening T20I by 41 runs, with Moeen Ali scoring the fastest fifty for England in the format, and the team making their second-highest total in a T20I match. South Africa won the second T20I by 58 runs to level the series, with Rilee Rossouw scoring 96 not out. South Africa won the third T20I by 90 runs to win the series 2–1.

South Africa won the first Test by an innings and 12 runs, with the match ending in three days. England won the second Test by an innings and 85 runs to level the series with one match to play. The first day of the final Test was washed out due to rain after England won the toss, and following the death of Queen Elizabeth II at the age of 96 at Balmoral Castle that day, the second day's play was cancelled as a mark of respect. The third day's play was started with tributes paid to the Queen, including a minute's silence followed by the national anthems. Both the teams and match officials were wearing black armbands. England won the final Test by 9 wickets in the first hour of the final day, to win the series 2–1.

== Squads ==
Tests		ODIs		T20Is	
England	South Africa	England	South Africa	England	South Africa
Ben Stokes (c); James Anderson; Jonny Bairstow; Stuart Broad; Harry Brook; Zak Crawley; Ben Duckett; Ben Foakes (wk); Jack Leach; Alex Lees; Craig Overton; Matthew Potts; Ollie Pope; Ollie Robinson; Joe Root	Dean Elgar (c); Sarel Erwee; Marco Jansen; Simon Harmer; Keshav Maharaj; Aiden Markram; Lungi Ngidi; Anrich Nortje; ~~Duanne Olivier~~; Keegan Petersen; Kagiso Rabada; Ryan Rickelton; Lutho Sipamla; Glenton Stuurman; Rassie van der Dussen; Wiaan Mulder; Kyle Verreynne (wk); Khaya Zondo	Jos Buttler (c); Moeen Ali; Jonny Bairstow; Brydon Carse; Sam Curran; Liam Livingstone; Craig Overton; Matthew Potts; Adil Rashid; Joe Root; Jason Roy; Phil Salt; Ben Stokes; Reece Topley; David Willey	Keshav Maharaj (c); Quinton de Kock (wk); Reeza Hendricks; Marco Jansen; Heinrich Klaasen; Janneman Malan; Aiden Markram; David Miller; Lungi Ngidi; Andile Phehlukwayo; Dwaine Pretorius; Anrich Nortje; Tabraiz Shamsi; Rassie van der Dussen; Lizaad Williams; Khaya Zondo; Kyle Verreynne	Jos Buttler (c); Moeen Ali; Jonny Bairstow; Harry Brook; Sam Curran; Richard Gleeson; Chris Jordan; Liam Livingstone; Dawid Malan; Adil Rashid; Jason Roy; Phil Salt; Reece Topley; David Willey	David Miller (c); Gerald Coetzee; Quinton de Kock (wk); Reeza Hendricks; Heinrich Klaasen; Keshav Maharaj; Aiden Markram; Lungi Ngidi; Anrich Nortje; Wayne Parnell; Andile Phehlukwayo; Dwaine Pretorius; Kagiso Rabada; Rilee Rossouw; Tabraiz Shamsi; Tristan Stubbs; Rassie van der Dussen

Brydon Carse was ruled out of England's squad for the third ODI due to a bruised toe. Duanne Olivier was ruled out of South Africa's Test squad due to a hip injury. Rassie van der Dussen was ruled out of South Africa's squad for the third Test due to a left index finger injury. Wiaan Mulder was named as his replacement. Jonny Bairstow was ruled out of England's squad for the third Test after sustaining a possible broken leg while playing golf. Ben Duckett replaced Bairstow in the squad.

== Tour matches ==
Prior to the ODI series, South Africa played two 50-over matches against the England Lions. The England Lions won the first match by six wickets, with South Africa winning the second match by 107 runs.

12 July 2022
11:00
Scorecard

South Africa; 318/9 (50 overs)	v	England Lions; 321/4 (37.1 overs)
Janneman Malan 103 (116); David Payne 4/39 (8 overs)		Will Smeed 90 (56); Andile Phehlukwayo 2/45 (5 overs)

England Lions won by 6 wickets
County Ground, Taunton
Umpires: Nick Cook (Eng) and Anthony Harris (Eng)

- South Africa won the toss and elected to bat.
- Will Smeed (England Lions) made his List A debuts.

14 July 2022
11:00
Scorecard

South Africa; 360/7 (50 overs)	v	England Lions; 253 (38.2 overs)
Heinrich Klaasen 123 (85); Sam Cook 3/56 (10 overs)		Stephen Eskinazi 79 (74); Tabraiz Shamsi 3/66 (10 overs)

South Africa won by 107 runs
New Road, Worcester
Umpires: Nick Cook (Eng) and Surendiran Shanmugam (Eng)

- South Africa won the toss and elected to bat.
- Jake Lintott (England Lions) made his List A debuts.

9–12 August 2022
Scorecard

South Africa	v	England Lions
433 (124.3 overs); Khaya Zondo 86 (166); Craig Overton 5/74 (29 overs)		672 (117 overs); Ben Duckett 145 (168); Aiden Markram 6/91 (16 overs)
183 (64.4 overs); Aiden Markram 88* (169); Sam Conners 4/25 (9.4 overs)

England Lions won by an innings and 56 runs
St Lawrence Ground, Canterbury
Umpires: Paul Pollard (Eng) and Surendiran Shanmugam (Eng)

- South Africa won the toss and elected to bat.

== ODI series ==
=== 1st ODI ===
19 July 2022
13:00 (D/N)
Scorecard

South Africa; 333/5 (50 overs)	v	England; 271 (46.5 overs)
Rassie van der Dussen 134 (117); Liam Livingstone 2/30 (4 overs)		Joe Root 86 (77); Anrich Nortje 4/53 (8.5 overs)

South Africa won by 62 runs
Riverside Ground, Chester-le-Street
Umpires: Mike Burns (Eng) and Richard Kettleborough (Eng)
Player of the match: Rassie van der Dussen (SA)

- South Africa won the toss and elected to bat.
- Matty Potts (Eng) made his ODI debut.
- Dwaine Pretorius replaced Andile Phehlukwayo as a concussion substitute for South Africa.

=== 2nd ODI ===
22 July 2022
13:00 (D/N)
Scorecard

England; 201 (28.1 overs)	v	South Africa; 83 (20.4 overs)
Liam Livingstone 38 (26); Dwaine Pretorius 4/36 (6 overs)		Heinrich Klaasen 33 (40); Adil Rashid 3/29 (6 overs)

England won by 118 runs
Old Trafford Cricket Ground, Manchester
Umpires: Richard Illingworth (Eng) and David Millns (Eng)
Player of the match: Sam Curran (Eng)

- South Africa won the toss and elected to field.
- The match was reduced to 29 overs per side due to rain.

=== 3rd ODI ===
24 July 2022
11:00
Scorecard

South Africa; 159/2 (27.4 overs)	v	England
Quinton de Kock 92* (76); David Willey 1/19 (4 overs)

No result
Headingley Cricket Ground, Leeds
Umpires: Richard Kettleborough (Eng) and Alex Wharf (Eng)

- South Africa won the toss and elected to bat.
- No further play was possible due to rain.

== T20I series ==
=== 1st T20I ===
27 July 2022
18:30 (N)
Scorecard

England; 234/6 (20 overs)	v	South Africa; 193/8 (20 overs)
Jonny Bairstow 90 (53); Lungi Ngidi 5/39 (4 overs)		Tristan Stubbs 72 (28); Richard Gleeson 3/51 (4 overs)

England won by 41 runs
Bristol County Ground, Bristol
Umpires: Mike Burns (Eng) and David Millns (Eng)
Player of the match: Moeen Ali (Eng)

- South Africa won the toss and elected to field.
- Moeen Ali scored the fastest fifty for England in T20Is (16 balls).
- England set a new team record for the most sixes in T20Is (20).
- Lungi Ngidi (SA) took his first five-wicket haul in T20Is.

=== 2nd T20I ===
28 July 2022
18:30 (N)
Scorecard

South Africa; 207/3 (20 overs)	v	England; 149 (16.4 overs)
Rilee Rossouw 96* (55); Moeen Ali 1/17 (2 overs)		Jonny Bairstow 30 (21); Tabraiz Shamsi 3/27 (4 overs)

South Africa won by 58 runs
Sophia Gardens, Cardiff
Umpires: David Millns (Eng) and Martin Saggers (Eng)
Player of the match: Rilee Rossouw (SA)

- England won the toss and elected to field.

=== 3rd T20I ===
31 July 2022
14:30
Scorecard

South Africa; 191/5 (20 overs)	v	England; 101 (16.4 overs)
Reeza Hendricks 70 (50); David Willey 3/25 (4 overs)		Jonny Bairstow 27 (30); Tabraiz Shamsi 5/24 (4 overs)

South Africa won by 90 runs
Rose Bowl, Southampton
Umpires: Martin Saggers (Eng) and Alex Wharf (Eng)
Player of the match: Tabraiz Shamsi (SA)

- England won the toss and elected to field.
- David Miller played in his 100th T20I for South Africa. (Note: David Miller (SA) has also played three T20I matches for a World XI team.)
- Tabraiz Shamsi (SA) took his first five-wicket haul in T20Is.

== Test series ==
=== 1st Test ===
17–21 August 2022 (Note: While five days of play were scheduled for each Test, the first and second Tests reached a result in three days.)
Scorecard

England	v	South Africa
165 (45 overs); Ollie Pope 73 (102); Kagiso Rabada 5/52 (19 overs)		326 (89.1 overs); Sarel Erwee 73 (146); Ben Stokes 3/71 (18 overs)
149 (37.4 overs); Stuart Broad 35 (29); Anrich Nortje 3/47 (7 overs)

South Africa won by an innings and 12 runs
Lord's, London
Umpires: Richard Illingworth (Eng) and Nitin Menon (Ind)
Player of the match: Kagiso Rabada (SA)

- South Africa won the toss and elected to field.
- Only 32 overs of play was possible on day 1 due to rain.
- World Test Championship points: South Africa 12, England 0.

=== 2nd Test ===
25–29 August 2022
Scorecard

South Africa	v	England
151 (53.2 overs); Kagiso Rabada 36 (72); James Anderson 3/32 (15 overs)		415/9d (106.4 overs); Ben Foakes 113* (217); Anrich Nortje 3/82 (20 overs)
179 (85.1 overs); Keegan Petersen 42 (159); Ollie Robinson 4/43 (15.1 overs)

England won by an innings and 85 runs
Old Trafford Cricket Ground, Manchester
Umpires: Chris Gaffaney (NZ) and Richard Illingworth (Eng)
Player of the match: Ben Stokes (Eng)

- South Africa won the toss and elected to bat.
- James Anderson (Eng) became the first cricketer to play 100 Test matches at home.
- World Test Championship points: England 12, South Africa 0.

=== 3rd Test ===
8–12 September 2022
Scorecard

South Africa	v	England
118 (36.2 overs); Marco Jansen 30 (59); Ollie Robinson 5/49 (14 overs)		158 (36.2 overs); Ollie Pope 67 (77); Marco Jansen 5/35 (12.2 overs)
169 (56.2 overs); Dean Elgar 36 (59); Ben Stokes 3/39 (13 overs)		130/1 (22.3 overs); Zak Crawley 69* (57); Kagiso Rabada 1/57 (11 overs)

England won by 9 wickets
The Oval, London
Umpires: Richard Kettleborough (Eng) and Nitin Menon (Ind)
Player of the match: Ollie Robinson (Eng)

- England won the toss and elected to field.
- No play was possible on Day 1 due to rain. Day 2 was cancelled following the death of Queen Elizabeth II on Day 1.
- Harry Brook (Eng) made his Test debut.
- Marco Jansen (SA) took his first five-wicket haul in Tests.
- World Test Championship points: England 12, South Africa 0.

== Ireland vs South Africa ==
South African cricket team against Ireland in England in 2022
	Ireland	South Africa
- Dates: 3 – 5 August 2022
Captains	Andrew Balbirnie	David Miller (Note: Keshav Maharaj captained South Africa for the first T20I.)

Twenty20 International series
- Results: South Africa won the 2-match series 2–0
Most runs	Lorcan Tucker (78)	Reeza Hendricks (116)
Most wickets	Gareth Delany (4)	Wayne Parnell (7)
- Player of the series: Reeza Hendricks (SA)

=== Squads ===
T20Is
Ireland	South Africa
Andrew Balbirnie (c); Mark Adair; Curtis Campher; Gareth Delany; George Dockrell; Stephen Doheny; Fionn Hand; Graham Hume; Josh Little; Andy McBrine; Barry McCarthy; Paul Stirling; Harry Tector; Lorcan Tucker; ~~Craig Young~~	David Miller (c); Gerald Coetzee; Quinton de Kock (wk); Reeza Hendricks; Heinrich Klaasen; Keshav Maharaj; Aiden Markram; Lungi Ngidi; Anrich Nortje; Wayne Parnell; Andile Phehlukwayo; Dwaine Pretorius; ~~Kagiso Rabada~~; Rilee Rossouw; Tabraiz Shamsi; Tristan Stubbs; Rassie van der Dussen

Before the series, Craig Young was forced to withdraw from Ireland's squad with Graham Hume named as his replacement. Kagiso Rabada was also ruled out of South Africa's squad due to an ankle injury.

=== T20I series ===
==== 1st T20I ====
3 August 2022
18:30 (D/N)
Scorecard

South Africa; 211/5 (20 overs)	v	Ireland; 190/9 (20 overs)
Reeza Hendricks 74 (53); Gareth Delany 2/31 (3 overs)		Lorcan Tucker 78 (38); Keshav Maharaj 2/29 (4 overs)

South Africa won by 21 runs
Bristol County Ground, Bristol
Umpires: Roland Black (Ire) and Martin Saggers (Eng)
Player of the match: Reeza Hendricks (SA)

- South Africa won the toss and elected to bat.

==== 2nd T20I ====
5 August 2022
18:30 (D/N)
Scorecard

South Africa; 182/6 (20 overs)	v	Ireland; 138 (18.5 overs)
Reeza Hendricks 42 (40); Gareth Delany 2/24 (4 overs)		Harry Tector 34 (31); Wayne Parnell 5/30 (4 overs)

South Africa won by 44 runs
Bristol County Ground, Bristol
Umpires: Mike Burns (Eng) and Paul Reynolds (Ire)
Player of the match: Wayne Parnell (SA)

- Ireland won the toss and elected to field.
- Wayne Parnell (SA) took his first five-wicket haul in T20Is.
