= 2026 Men's T20 World Cup Africa Sub-regional Qualifier C =

Qualification tournament for the 2028 T20WC in Africa region

2026 ICC Men's T20 World Cup Africa Sub-regional Qualifier C
- Dates: 20 – 25 October 2026
- Administrator: Africa Cricket Association
- Cricket format: Twenty20 International
- Tournament format: Round-robin
- Host: Nigeria
- Champions: Nigeria
- Runners-up: Uganda
- Participants: 6
- Most runs: (Nigeria) Isaac Danladi (223)
- Most wickets: (Uganda) Enock Kasaija (11) (Mozambique) Vieira Tembo (11)

The 2026 ICC Men's T20 World Cup Africa Sub-regional Qualifier C was a cricket tournament that formed part of the qualification process for the 2028 Men's T20 World Cup. It was hosted by Nigeria in October 2026.

The top two sides in the tournament advanced to the regional final, where they will be joined by four other teams from sub-regional qualifiers A and B.

== Squads ==
Gambia	Lesotho	Mozambique	Nigeria	Uganda	Zambia
Abubacarr Kuyateh (c); Ousman Bah (wk); Modou Bojang; Frank Campbell; Aniru Conteh; David Demba; Pa Assan Faye; Alieu Gibba; Andreh Jarju; Musa Jobarteh; Muhammed Manga (wk); Mustapha Suwareh; Fallou Thorpe; Malang Touray	Ts'episo Chaoana (c); Inshaf Farook; Lerotholi Gabriel; Maaz Khan; Malei Khauta; Tanki Khetsi; Lebona Leokaoke; Jabulani Matjatje; Bahlakoana Mejaro; Lefulere Monanthane; Ajaz Patel; Mohmed Duvesh Patel; Gladwin Thamae; Chachole Tlali (wk)	Agostinho Navicha (c); Manussur Algi; Jose Bulele; Gomes Gomes; Joao Hou; Jose Joao; Charles Mbebe; Emerson Ndzeute; Farruque Nhaduate (wk); Camate Roposo; Lourenco Salomone; Lourenço Simango; Vieira Tembo (wk); Quelido Uqueio	Chima Akachukwu (c); Ridwan Abdulkareem; Vincent Adewoye; Peter Aho; Miracle Akhigbe; Kenneth Boniface; Isaac Danladi; Abdullahi Ismail; Abdulmumuni Mohammed; Elochukwu Ndubudem; Isaac Okpe; Sylvester Okpe; Ali Rahmon; Selim Salau	Riazat Ali Shah (c); Kenneth Waiswa (vc); Joseph Baguma; Anas Baig; Raghav Dhawan; Olipa Gerald; Cyrus Kakuru (wk); Enock Kasaija; Juma Miyagi; Charles Musemez (wk); Robinson Obuya; Pius Oloka; Alpesh Ramjani; Sumeet Verma	Javid Patel (c); Muhammad Asim; Joyeb Chand; Chimya Chilekwa; Ayaz Dadabhai; Ismail Kara; Robert Lungu; Shadreck Malama (wk); Jakir Patel; Zahirbhai Patel; Soyeb Pendi; Musonda Yambayamba (wk); Zakir Zaba; Joshep Zulu

== Points table ==
Qualifier C standings
Pos	Team	Pld	W	L	NR	Pts	NRR	Qualification
1	Nigeria	5	5	0	0	10	4.610	Advanced to the regional final
2	Uganda	5	4	1	0	8	4.874	Advanced to the regional final
3	Zambia	5	2	3	0	4	0.101	
4	Mozambique	5	2	3	0	4	−2.731	
5	Lesotho	5	1	4	0	2	−1.371	
6	Gambia	5	1	4	0	2	−4.242	

Source: Cricinfo

== Fixtures ==
20 October 2026
10:00
Scorecard

Uganda; 195/6 (20 overs)	v	Zambia; 108 (17.3 overs)
Olipa Gerald 82 (42); Joshep Zulu 2/36 (4 overs)		Joyeb Chand 38 (28); Joseph Baguma 4/44 (4 overs)

Uganda won by 87 runs
Nigeria Cricket Federation Oval 1, Abuja
Umpires: Iknow Chabi (Zim) and Charles Kariuki (Uga)
Player of the match: Olipa Gerald (Uga)

- Uganda won the toss and elected to bat.
- Zahirbhai Patel (Zam) made his T20I debut.

20 October 2026
14:00
Scorecard

Lesotho; 169/8 (20 overs)	v	Mozambique; 95 (18.2 overs)
Mohmed Duvesh Patel 63 (45); Vieira Tembo 3/21 (4 overs)		Joao Huo 49 (45); Mohmed Duvesh Patel 2/12 (3 overs)

Lesotho won by 74 runs
Nigeria Cricket Federation Oval 1, Abuja
Umpires: Habib Enesi (Nga) and Gaston Niyibizi (Rwa)
Player of the match: Mohmed Duvesh Patel (Les)

- Lesotho won the toss and elected to bat.
- Mohmed Duvesh Patel (Les) made his T20I debut.

20 October 2026
14:00
Scorecard

Nigeria; 262/1 (20 overs)	v	Gambia; 102 (17.2 overs)
Selim Salau 105* (58); David Demba 1/39 (2 overs)		Andre Jarju 39 (38); Ridwan Abdulkareem 3/8 (4 overs)

Nigeria won by 160 runs
Nigeria Cricket Federation Oval 2, Abuja
Umpires: Stephen Harris (SA) and Adil Kassam (Tan)
Player of the match: Selim Salau (Nga)

- Nigeria won the toss and elected to bat.
- Pa Assan Faye (Gam) made his T20I debut.
- Selim Salau (Nga) scored his 1000th run in T20Is.

21 October 2026
10:00
Scorecard

Mozambique; 148/6 (20 overs)	v	Gambia; 120/8 (20 overs)
Agostinho Navicha 61* (31); Andreh Jarju 2/22 (1.4 overs)		David Demba 45* (29); Vieira Tembo 3/27 (4 overs)

Mozambique won by 28 runs
Nigeria Cricket Federation Oval 1, Abuja
Umpires: Habib Enesi (Nga) and Kehinde Olanbiwonnu (Nga)
Player of the match: Agostinho Navicha (Moz)

- Mozambique won the toss and elected to bat.
- Alieu Gibba (Gam) made his T20I debut.

21 October 2026
10:00
Scorecard

Lesotho; 87 (19.3 overs)	v	Uganda; 89/5 (12.3 overs)
Maaz Khan 38 (32); Kenneth Waiswa 4/18 (4 overs)		Riazat Ali Shah 26 (15); Ts'episo Chaoana 3/13 (4 overs)

Uganda won by 5 wickets
Nigeria Cricket Federation Oval 2, Abuja
Umpires: Stephen Harris (SA) and Charles Kariuki (Uga)
Player of the match: Kenneth Waiswa (Uga)

- Lesotho won the toss and elected to bat.
- Pius Oloka (Uga) made his T20I debut.

21 October 2026
14:00
Scorecard

Zambia; 142/9 (20 overs)	v	Nigeria; 146/1 (14.5 overs)
Ismail Kara 82 (44); Abdullahi Ismail 3/9 (4 overs)		Isaac Danladi 90* (47)

Nigeria won by 9 wickets
Nigeria Cricket Federation Oval 1, Abuja
Umpires: Iknow Chabi (Zim) and Justine Muzungu (Bot)
Player of the match: Isaac Danladi (Nga)

- Zambia won the toss and elected to bat.

23 October 2026
10:00
Scorecard

Mozambique; 93 (19.4 overs)	v	Nigeria; 94/3 (8.3 overs)
Joao Hou 35 (31); Isaac Okpe 4/3 (3.4 overs)		Ali Rahmon 41 (24); Vieera Tembo 2/10 (1 over)

Nigeria won by 7 wickets
Nigeria Cricket Federation Oval 1, Abuja
Umpires: Adil Kassam (Tan) and Justine Muzungu (Bot)
Player of the match: Isaac Okpe (Nga)

- Mozambique won the toss and elected to bat.

23 October 2026
10:00
Scorecard

Lesotho; 58 (13.4 overs)	v	Zambia; 61/3 (7.4 overs)
Mohmed Duvesh Patel 38 (32); Zahirbhai Patel 4/4 (3 overs)		Jakir Patel 22* (17); Ts'episo Chaoana 2/19 (3 overs)

Zambia won by 7 wickets
Nigeria Cricket Federation Oval 2, Abuja
Umpires: Stephen Harris (SA) and Gaston Niyibizi (Rwa)
Player of the match: Zahirbhai Patel (Zam)

- Lesotho won the toss and elected to bat.
- Chimya Chilekwa (Zam) made his T20I debut.

23 October 2026
14:00
Scorecard

Gambia; 27 (8.2 overs)	v	Uganda; 28/0 (1.4 overs)
Andre Jarju 15* (15); Riazat Ali Shah 3/11 (3 overs)		Robinson Obuya 20* (6)

Uganda won by 10 wickets
Nigeria Cricket Federation Oval 2, Abuja
Umpires: Iknow Chabi (Zim) and Kehinde Olanbiwonnu (Nga)
Player of the match: Riazat Ali Shah (Uga)

- Gambia won the toss and elected to bat.
- Malang Touray (Gam) made his T20I debut.

24 October 2026
10:00
Scorecard

Mozambique; 19 (7.2 overs)	v	Uganda; 23/0 (0.5 overs)
Lourenco Salomone 4 (4); Juma Miyagi 5/7 (4 overs)		Robinson Obuya 16* (3)

Uganda won by 10 wickets
Nigeria Cricket Federation Oval 2, Abuja
Umpires: Habib Enesi (Nga) and Charles Kariuki (Ken)
Player of the match: Juma Miyagi (Uga)

- Mozambique won the toss and elected to bat.
- Juma Miyagi (Uga) took his first five-wicket haul in T20Is.

24 October 2026
14:00
Scorecard

Gambia; 93/9 (20 overs)	v	Zambia; 97/2 (11.4 overs)
Aniru Conteh 16 (31); Ayaz Dadabhai 4/15 (4 overs)		Shadreck Malama 38* (31); Abubacarr Kuyateh 1/15 (3 overs)

Zambia won by 8 wickets
Nigeria Cricket Federation Oval 1, Abuja
Umpires: Adil Kassam (Tan) and Kehinde Olanbiwonnu (Nga)
Player of the match: Ayaz Dadabhai (Zam)

- Gambia won the toss and elected to bat.

24 October 2026
14:00
Scorecard

Lesotho; 62 (12.5 overs)	v	Nigeria; 65/3 (7.4 overs)
Ts'episo Chaoana 26* (18); Chima Akachukwu 3/6 (2.1 overs)		Ridwan Abdulkareem 28* (18); Inshaf Farook 2/19 (3 overs)

Nigeria won by 7 wickets
Nigeria Cricket Federation Oval 2, Abuja
Umpires: Justine Muzungu (Bot) and Gaston Niyibizi (Rwa)
Player of the match: Chima Akachukwu (Nga)

- Lesotho won the toss and elected to bat.

25 October 2026
10:00
Scorecard

Gambia; 112/9 (20 overs)	v	Lesotho; 109 (19.5 overs)
Abubacarr Kuyateh 29 (33); Mohmed Duvesh Patel 4/18 (4 overs)		Inshaf Farook 35* (27); Aniru Conteh 4/24 (4 overs)

Gambia won by 3 runs
Nigeria Cricket Federation Oval 1, Abuja
Umpires: Charles Kariuki (Uga) and Justine Muzungu (Bot)
Player of the match: Mohmed Duvesh Patel (Les)

- Gambia won the toss and elected to bat.
- Jabulani Matjatje (Les) made his T20I debut.

25 October 2026
10:00
Scorecard

Zambia; 109/9 (20 overs)	v	Mozambique; 110/7 (19 overs)
Javid Patel 26* (21); Vieira Tembo 3/22 (4 overs)		Agostinho Navicha 41 (47); Soyeb Pendi 2/13 (4 overs)

Mozambique won by 3 wickets
Nigeria Cricket Federation Oval 2, Abuja
Umpires: Habib Enesi (Nga) and Adil Kassam (Tan)
Player of the match: Agostinho Navicha (Moz)

- Mozambique won the toss and elected to field.

25 October 2026
14:00
Scorecard

Nigeria; 148 (19.4 overs)	v	Uganda; 147/9 (20 overs)
Isaac Danladi 47 (28); Joseph Baguma 4/21 (4 overs)		Riazat Ali Shah 60 (36); Sylvester Okpe 2/14 (2.2 overs)

Nigeria win by 1 run
Nigeria Cricket Federation Oval 1, Abuja
Umpires: Iknow Chabi (Zim) and Stephen Harris (SA)
Player of the match: Isaac Danladi (Nga)

- Nigeria won the toss and elected to bat.

== See also ==
- 2026 Men's T20 World Cup Africa Sub-regional Qualifier A
- 2026 Men's T20 World Cup Africa Sub-regional Qualifier B
