= 2026 Men's T20 World Cup Africa Sub-regional Qualifier B =

Qualification tournament for the 2028 T20WC in Africa region

2026 ICC Men's T20 World Cup Africa Sub-regional Qualifier B
- Dates: 24 – 29 March 2026
- Administrator: ICC Africa
- Cricket format: Twenty20 International
- Tournament format: Single round-robin
- Host: Ghana
- Champions: Tanzania
- Runners-up: Ghana
- Participants: 6
- Matches: 15
- Most runs: (Tanzania) Ivan Selemani (211)
- Most wickets: (Tanzania) Khalidy Juma (8) (Tanzania) Laksh Bakrania (8) (Malawi) Daniel Jakiel (8)

The 2026 ICC Men's T20 World Cup Africa Sub-regional Qualifier B was a cricket tournament that formed part of the qualification process for the 2028 Men's T20 World Cup. It was hosted by Ghana in March 2026.

The top two sides: Ghana and Tanzania, advanced to the regional final, where they will be joined by Namibia, who received a bye after participating in the previous T20 World Cup, along with two teams from Sub-regional Qualifier A (Kenya and Rwanda) and two teams yet to advance from Sub-regional Qualifier C.

== Squads ==
Eswatini	Ghana	Malawi	Saint Helena	Seychelles	Tanzania
Adil Butt (c); Mohammed Alamgir; Saqib Anwar; Thandolwethu Dlamini; Hujeifa Jangariya (wk); Mancoba Jele; Sibusiso Jele; Minhaz Khojbariya; Melusi Magagula; Het Patel; Eric Phiri; Umair Qasim; Rohan Sandeep; Javid Suleman	Obed Harvey (c); Isaac Aboagye; Vincent Ateak; Frank Baaleri (wk); Richmond Baaleri; Shijo Devasia; Jayant Gautam; Bharani Majji; Ayushmaan Mishra; Nitesh; Lee Nyarko; Devender Singh (wk); Judah Solomon; Philip Yevugah	Gift Kansonkho (c); Bright Balala; Chisomo Chete (wk); Mike Choamba; Daniel Jakiel; Donnex Kansonkho; Aaftab Limdawala; Trust Makaya; Blessings Pondani; Precious Sapesa; Sami Sohail; Kazim Somani; Kelvin Thuchila; Suhail Vayani	Cliff Richards (c, wk); Jamie Essex; Rhys Francis; Jordi Henry; Kirk Lawrence; Aiden Leo; Branden Leo; Dane Leo; Delroy Leo; Stefan Leo; Barry Stroud; Joey Thomas; Andrew Yon; Jordon Yon	Thiwanka Rajapaksha (c); Deso Kalvin (vc); Rashen de Silva; Nagarajan Gnanapragasam; Hirani Harji; Jobayer Hossen; Mazharul Islam; Manikandan Mariyappan; Shanmugasundram Mohan (wk); Santosh Pillay; Sohail Rocket; Samarathunga Rukmal; Mohomed Saddam; Thilina Silva; Manisankar Viswanathan	Kassim Nassoro (c); Ajith Augastin (wk); Laksh Bakrania; Raymond Francis; Ally Hafidh; Khalidy Juma; Malizia Kibwana; Ally Kimote; Omary Kitunda (wk); Simba Mbaki; Dhrumit Mehta; Yalinde Nkanya; Ivan Selemani; Mukesh Suthar; Arun Yadav

== Points table ==
Qualifier B standings
Pos	Team	Pld	W	L	NR	Pts	NRR	Qualification
1	Tanzania	5	4	0	1	9	6.705	Advanced to the regional final
2	Ghana (H)	5	4	0	1	9	3.309	Advanced to the regional final
3	Malawi	5	2	2	1	5	0.778	Eliminated
4	Seychelles	5	1	3	1	3	−3.045	Eliminated
5	Eswatini	5	1	3	1	3	−3.983	Eliminated
6	Saint Helena	5	0	4	1	1	−3.931	Eliminated

Source: Cricinfo
(H) Host

== Fixtures ==
24 March 2026
09:30
Scorecard

Malawi; 77 (19.1 overs)	v	Tanzania; 78/2 (13.2 overs)
Kazim Somani 15 (22); Arun Yadav 2/9 (3 overs)		Dhrumit Mehta 24 (29); Sami Sohail 1/17 (3 overs)

Tanzania won by 8 wickets
Achimota Oval A, Accra
Umpires: Habib Enesi (Nga) and David Odhiambo (Ken)
Player of the match: Arun Yadav (Tan)

- Tanzania won the toss and elected to field.

24 March 2026
13:50
Scorecard

Eswatini; 115/8 (20 overs)	v	Saint Helena; 88 (18.4 overs)
Hujeifa Jangariya 36 (29); Rhys Francis 3/17 (4 overs)		Jamie Essex 30 (44); Melusi Magagula 4/10 (3.4 overs)

Eswatini won by 27 runs
Achimota Oval A, Accra
Umpires: Arno Jacobs (SA) and Adil Kassam (Tan)
Player of the match: Melusi Magagula (Esw)

- Eswatini won the toss and elected to bat.
- Saqib Anwar (Esw) made his T20I debut.

24 March 2026
13:50
Scorecard

Seychelles; 72 (19.4 overs)	v	Ghana; 76/4 (10.1 overs)
Jobayer Hossen 26 (33); Isaac Aboagye 3/6 (4 overs)		Bharani Majji 23 (26); Thiwanka Rajapaksha 1/5 (1 over)

Ghana won by 6 wickets
Achimota Oval B, Accra
Umpires: Rockie D'Mello (Ken) and Percival Sizara (Zim)
Player of the match: Isaac Aboagye (Gha)

- Ghana won the toss and elected to field.
- Jayant Gautam, Bharani Majji, Nitesh Hooda, Judah Solomon (Gha), Mohomed Saddam and Thilina Silva (Sey) all made their T20I debuts.

25 March 2026
09:30
Scorecard

Saint Helena; 95/7 (20 overs)	v	Seychelles; 96/3 (18 overs)
Joey Thomas 26* (29); Samarathunga Rukmal 3/12 (4 overs)		Rashen de Silva 51 (57); Jordi Henry 1/6 (2 overs)

Seychelles won by 7 wickets
Achimota Oval A, Accra
Umpires: Adil Kassam (Tan) and Claus Schumacher (Nam)
Player of the match: Rashen de Silva (Sey)

- Seychelles won the toss and elected to field.
- Manisankar Viswanathan (Sey) made his T20I debut.

25 March 2026
09:30
Scorecard

Tanzania; 178/4 (20 overs)	v	Eswatini; 20 (13 overs)
Mukesh Suthar 65* (42); Adil Butt 2/38 (4 overs)		Sibusiso Jele 5 (8); Ally Kimote 3/4 (3 overs)

Tanzania won by 158 runs
Achimota Oval B, Accra
Umpires: Habib Enesi (Nga) and Patric Makumbi (Uga)
Player of the match: Mukesh Suthar (Tan)

- Eswatini won the toss and elected to field.

25 March 2026
13:50
Scorecard

Malawi; 98/8 (20 overs)	v	Ghana; 99/8 (20 overs)
Sami Sohail 24 (18); Nitesh 3/16 (4 overs)		Bharani Majji 30 (41); Daniel Jakiel 4/21 (4 overs)

Ghana won by 2 wickets
Achimota Oval A, Accra
Umpires: Arno Jacobs (SA) and Rockie D'Mello (Ken)
Player of the match: Nitesh (Gha)

- Ghana won the toss and elected to field.

27 March 2026
09:30
Scorecard

Saint Helena; 77 (20 overs)	v	Ghana; 78/1 (6.4 overs)
Jamie Essex 13 (20); Bharani Majji 2/9 (4 overs)		Jayant Gautam 44* (22); Aiden Leo 1/9 (1 over)

Ghana won by 9 wickets
Achimota Oval A, Accra
Umpires: Patric Makumbi (Uga) and David Odhiambo (Ken)
Player of the match: Jayanr Gautam (Gha)

- Ghana won the toss and elected to field.
- Shijo Devasia (Gha) made his T20I debut.

27 March 2026
09:30
Scorecard

Eswatini; 75 (15.2 overs)	v	Malawi; 77/2 (6.5 overs)
Adil Butt 21 (16); Kelvin Thuchila 6/8 (4 overs)		Sami Sohail 50* (19); Saqib Anwar 1/13 (2 overs)

Malawi won by 8 wickets
Achimota Oval B, Accra
Umpires: Adil Kassam (Tan) and Claus Schumacher (Nam)
Player of the match: Kelvin Thuchila (Mwi)

- Eswatini won the toss and elected to bat.
- Kelvin Thuchila (Mwi) took his first five-wicket haul in T20Is.

27 March 2026
13:50
Scorecard

Tanzania; 205/3 (20 overs)	v	Seychelles; 52/9 (20 overs)
Ivan Selemani 110 (52); Thilina Silva 2/28 (4 overs)		Mazharul Islam 17 (28); Ajith Augastin 2/0 (4 overs)

Tanzania won by 153 runs
Achimota Oval B, Accra
Umpires: Arno Jacobs (SA) and Percival Sizara (Zim)
Player of the match: Ivan Selemani (Tan)

- Tanzania won the toss and elected to bat.
- Ivan Selemani became the first player for Tanzania to score a century in T20Is.

28 March 2026
09:30
Scorecard

Tanzania; 236/4 (20 overs)	v	Saint Helena; 75 (18.3 overs)
Ivan Selemani 63 (30); Joey Thomas 2/44 (4 overs)		Jordi Henry 23 (19); Laksh Bakrania 3/8 (4 overs)

Tanzania won by 161 runs
Achimota Oval B, Accra
Umpires: Arno Jacobs (SA) and David Odhiambo (Ken)
Player of the match: Ivan Selemani (Tan)

- Tanzania won the toss and elected to bat.

28 March 2026
13:50
Scorecard

Seychelles; 108/7 (20 overs)	v	Malawi; 111/4 (17 overs)
Mazharul Islam 50 (53); Sami Sohail 3/19 (4 overs)		Sami Sohail 33 (24); Mazharul Islam 1/8 (2 overs)

Malawi won by 6 wickets
Achimota Oval A, Accra
Umpires: Habib Enesi (Nga) and Claus Schumacher (Nam)
Player of the match: Sami Sohail (Mwi)

- Malawi won the toss and elected to field.
- Santosh Pillay (Sey) made his T20I debut.

28 March 2026
13:50
Scorecard

Ghana; 178/5 (20 overs)	v	Eswatini; 95 (17.5 overs)
Obed Harvey 39 (34); Melusi Magagula 2/32 (4 overs)		Adil Butt 35 (28); Bharani Majji 3/11 (2.5 overs)

Ghana won by 83 runs
Achimota Oval B, Accra
Umpires: Rockie D'Mello (Ken) and Patric Makumbi (Uga)
Player of the match: Isaac Aboagye (Gha)

- Ghana won the toss and elected to bat.
- Ayushmaan Mishra (Gha) made his T20I debut.

29 March 2026
09:30
Scorecard

Eswatini	v	Seychelles

Match abandoned
Achimota Oval A, Accra
Umpires: Habib Enesi (Nga) and Adil Kassam (Tan)

- No toss.
- No play was possible due to rain.

29 March 2026
13:50
Scorecard

Ghana	v	Tanzania

Match abandoned
Achimota Oval A, Accra
Umpires: David Odhiambo (Ken) and Claus Schumacher (Nam)

- No toss.
- No play was possible due to rain.

29 March 2026
13:50
Scorecard

Malawi	v	Saint Helena

Match abandoned
Achimota Oval B, Accra
Umpires: Patric Makumbi (Uga) and Percival Sizara (Zim)

- No toss.
- No play was possible due to rain.

== See also ==
- 2026 Men's T20 World Cup Africa Sub-regional Qualifier A
- 2026 Men's T20 World Cup Africa Sub-regional Qualifier C
