= 2024 Men's T20 World Cup Africa Sub-regional Qualifier C =

Qualification tournament for the 2026 T20WC in Africa region

2024 ICC Men's T20 World Cup Africa Sub-regional Qualifier C
- Dates: 23 – 28 November 2024
- Administrator: Africa Cricket Association
- Cricket format: Twenty20 International
- Tournament format: Round-robin
- Host: Nigeria
- Champions: Nigeria
- Runners-up: Botswana
- Participants: 6
- Matches: 15
- Player of the series: (Nigeria) Isaac Danladi
- Most runs: (Nigeria) Sulaimon Runsewe (231)
- Most wickets: (Nigeria) Ridwan Abdulkareem (14)

The 2024 ICC Men's T20 World Cup Africa Sub-regional Qualifier C was a cricket tournament that formed part of the qualification process for the 2026 Men's T20 World Cup. It was hosted by Nigeria in November 2024.

The top two sides in the tournament advanced to the regional final, where they will be joined by Namibia and Uganda, who were given a bye after having participated in the previous T20 World Cup, and four other teams from sub-regional qualifiers A and B. Nigeria and Botswana both secured their places in the regional final with a game to spare, before the Nigerians defeated the latter in the final match of the tournament. Nigeria's Isaac Danladi was named the player of the tournament.

== Squads ==
Botswana	Eswatini	Ivory Coast	Nigeria	Saint Helena	Sierra Leone
Karabo Motlhanka (c); Michael Badenhorst; Vinoo Balakrishnan; Monroux Kasselman; Alfred Kgosiemang; Boemo Khumalo; Valentine Mbazo (wk); Mmoloki Mooketsi; Tumelo Mpatane; Reginald Nehonde; Tharindu Perera; Katlo Piet; Phemelo Silas; Thatayaone Tshose	Adil Butt (c); Mancoba Jele (vc); Mohammed Alamgir; Muhammad Amin; Buhle Dlamini; Thandolwethu Dlamini; Sibusiso Jele; Minhaz Khojbariya; Melusi Magagula; Umair Qasim; Rohan Sandeep; Tarun Sandeep (wk); Javid Suleman; Joseph Wright	Dosso Issiaka (c); Mimi Alex; Kone Aziz; Dje Claude; Pamba Dimitri; Ouattara Djakaridja; Ladji Ezechiel; Konan Felix; Maiga Ibrahim (wk); Ouattara Issouf (wk); Ouattara Mohamed; Kone Nagnama; Assouan Roger; Kouakou Wilfried	Sylvester Okpe (c); Ridwan Abdulkareem; Vincent Adewoye; Peter Aho; Daniel Ajekun; Joshua Asia; Isaac Danladi; Isaac Okpe; Olayinka Olaleye; Sulaimon Runsewe; Selim Salau; Mohameed Taiwo; Chiemelie Udekwe; Prosper Useni	Cliff Richards (c, wk); Scott Crowie; Jamie Essex; Rhys Francis; Brett Isaac; Aiden Leo; Branden Leo; Dane Leo; Delroy Leo; Barry Stroud; Joey Thomas; David Young (wk); Andrew Yon; Jordan Yon	Lansana Lamin (c); Chernoh Bah; John Bangura (wk); Raymond Coker; Samuel Conteh; Abass Gbla; Yegbeh Jalloh (wk); Aruna Kainessie; Abubakar Kamara; Ishmael Komba; George Ngegba; George Sesay; Alusine Turay; Solomon Williams

== Points table ==
Qualifier C standings
Pos	Team	Pld	W	L	NR	Pts	NRR	Qualification
1	Nigeria (H)	5	5	0	0	10	5.372	Advanced to the regional final
2	Botswana	5	4	1	0	8	1.796	Advanced to the regional final
3	Sierra Leone	5	3	2	0	6	2.474	Eliminated
4	Eswatini	5	2	3	0	4	−0.337	Eliminated
5	Saint Helena	5	1	4	0	2	−1.369	Eliminated
6	Ivory Coast	5	0	5	0	0	−10.698	Eliminated

Source: ESPNcricinfo
(H) Host

== Fixtures ==
23 November 2024
10:00
Scorecard

Botswana; 175/4 (20 overs)	v	Eswatini; 127 (18.4 overs)
Vinoo Balakrishnan 101 (66); Mancoba Jele 2/30 (3 overs)		Javid Suleman 35 (38); Mmoloki Mooketsi 3/23 (4 overs)

Botswana won by 48 runs
Nigeria Cricket Federation Oval 1, Abuja
Umpires: Stephen Harris (SA) and Claus Schumacher (Nam)
Player of the match: Vinoo Balakrishnan (Bot)

- Botswana won the toss and elected to bat.
- Sibusiso Jele, Minhaz Khojbariya and Javid Suleman (Esw) all made their T20I debuts.
- Karabo Motlhanka (Bot) became the first player for Botswana to score 1000 runs in T20Is.

23 November 2024
14:15
Scorecard

Sierra Leone; 189/2 (20 overs)	v	Ivory Coast; 21 (10.4 overs)
George Ngegba 72* (44); Kone Aziz 1/29 (4 overs)		Mimi Alex 5 (3); George Ngegba 5/12 (3.4 overs)

Sierra Leone won by 168 runs
Nigeria Cricket Federation Oval 1, Abuja
Umpires: Arno Jacobs (SA) and Andrew Louw (Nam)
Player of the match: George Ngegba (Sle)

- Sierra Leone won the toss and elected to bat.
- Mimi Alex, Kone Aziz, Dje Claude, Ouattara Djakaridja, Pamba Dimitri, Ladji Ezechiel, Maiga Ibrahim, Dosso Issiaka, Ouattara Mohamed, Kone Nagnama and Kouakou Wilfried (Civ) all made their T20I debuts.
- George Ngegba (Sle) took his first five-wicket haul in T20Is.

23 November 2024
14:15
Scorecard

Nigeria; 185/2 (20 overs)	v	Saint Helena; 67 (19.1 overs)
Sulaimon Runsewe 60 (51); Scott Crowie 1/22 (2 overs)		Aiden Leo 19 (29); Ridwan Abdulkareem 4/13 (4 overs)

Nigeria won by 118 runs
Nigeria Cricket Federation Oval 2, Abuja
Umpires: Sarah Dambanevana (Zim) and Masudur Rahman (Ban)
Player of the match: Ridwan Abdulkareem (Nga)

- Nigeria won the toss and elected to bat.
- Jamie Essex, Branden Leo, Joey Thomas and David Young (Shn) all made their T20I debuts.
- Ridwan Abdulkareem (Nga) took his first hat-trick in T20Is.

24 November 2024
10:00
Scorecard

Sierra Leone; 115 (15.4 overs)	v	Botswana; 117/5 (17.3 overs)
Aruna Kainessie 40 (29); Tharindu Perera 4/21 (4 overs)		Valentine Mbazo 35 (33); Chernoh Bah 2/16 (3.3 overs)

Botswana won by 5 wickets
Nigeria Cricket Federation Oval 2, Abuja
Umpires: Kehinde Olanbiwonnu (Nga) and Claus Schumacher (Nam)
Player of the match: Tharindu Perera (Bot)

- Sierra Leone won the toss and elected to bat.

24 November 2024
14:15
Scorecard

Nigeria; 271/4 (20 overs)	v	Ivory Coast; 7 (7.3 overs)
Selim Salau 112 (53); Pamba Dimitri 1/45 (4 overs)		Ouattara Mohamed 4 (6); Prosper Useni 3/0 (1.3 overs)

Nigeria won by 264 runs
Nigeria Cricket Federation Oval 1, Abuja
Umpires: Stephen Harris (SA) and David Odhiambo (Ken)
Player of the match: Selim Salau (Nga)

- Nigeria won the toss and elected to bat.
- Selim Salau became the first player for Nigeria to score a century in men's T20Is.
- Ivory Coast's total (7) was the lowest team total in men's T20Is.

24 November 2024
14:15
Scorecard

Eswatini; 173/9 (20 overs)	v	Saint Helena; 125/5 (20 overs)
Adil Butt 81 (43); Aiden Leo 2/17 (3 overs)		Scott Crowie 54* (53); Umair Qasim 3/14 (4 overs)

Eswatini won by 48 runs
Nigeria Cricket Federation Oval 2, Abuja
Umpires: Aasif Iqbal (UAE) and Andrew Louw (Nam)
Player of the match: Adil Butt (Esw)

- Eswatini won the toss and elected to bat.

26 November 2024
10:00
Scorecard

Saint Helena; 135/5 (20 overs)	v	Sierra Leone; 141/6 (19 overs)
Andrew Yon 67 (48); George Sesay 1/15 (4 overs)		Alusine Turay 44 (35); Barry Stroud 2/17 (4 overs)

Sierra Leone won by 4 wickets
Nigeria Cricket Federation Oval 1, Abuja
Umpires: Arno Jacobs (SA) and Masudur Rahman (Ban)
Player of the match: Alusine Turay (Sle)

- Sierra Leone won the toss and elected to field.
- Dane Leo and Delroy Leo (Shn) both made their T20I debuts.

26 November 2024
14:15
Scorecard

Eswatini; 137/7 (20 overs)	v	Nigeria; 138/5 (15 overs)
Adil Butt 88* (60); Isaac Danladi 3/13 (4 overs)		Selim Salau 31 (20); Olayinka Olaleye 31 (20); Mancoba Jele 1/19 (2 overs)

Nigeria won by 5 wickets
Nigeria Cricket Federation Oval 1, Abuja
Umpires: Aasif Iqbal (UAE) and David Odhiambo (Ken)
Player of the match: Isaac Danladi (Nga)

- Eswatini won the toss and elected to bat.

26 November 2024
14:15
Scorecard

Ivory Coast; 31 (11 overs)	v	Botswana; 35/0 (2.1 overs)
Ouattara Mohamed 10 (14); Mmoloki Mooketsi 3/0 (2 overs)		Monroux Kasselman 19* (9)

Botswana won by 10 wickets
Nigeria Cricket Federation Oval 2, Abuja
Umpires: Sarah Dambanevana (Zim) and Kehinde Olanbiwonnu (Nga)
Player of the match: Mmoloki Mooketsi (Bot)

- Botswana won the toss and elected to field.
- Assouan Roger (Civ) made his T20I debut.

27 November 2024
10:00
Scorecard

Nigeria; 141/6 (20 overs)	v	Sierra Leone; 112/5 (20 overs)
Isaac Danladi 46 (33); Abass Gbla 2/14 (2 overs)		Abass Gbla 41* (41); Isaac Danladi 1/13 (2 overs)

Nigeria won by 29 runs
Nigeria Cricket Federation Oval 1, Abuja
Umpires: Arno Jacobs (SA) and Claus Schumacher (Nam)
Player of the match: Isaac Danladi (Nga)

- Sierra Leone won the toss and elected to field.
- Ishmael Komba (Sle) made his T20I debut.

27 November 2024
14:15
Scorecard

Saint Helena; 78 (18.4 overs)	v	Botswana; 79/1 (12 overs)
Scott Crowie 26 (32); Mmoloki Mooketsi 3/11 (4 overs)		Karabo Motlhanka 52* (47); Barry Stroud 1/21 (4 overs)

Botswana won by 9 wickets
Nigeria Cricket Federation Oval 1, Abuja
Umpires: Stephen Harris (SA) and Andrew Louw (Nam)
Player of the match: Karabo Motlhanka (Bot)

- Saint Helena won the toss and elected to bat.
- Jordan Yon (Shn) made his T20I debut.

27 November 2024
14:15
Scorecard

Ivory Coast; 41 (19 overs)	v	Eswatini; 44/2 (3.1 overs)
Kone Aziz 10 (27); Melusi Magagula 3/4 (2 overs)		Rohan Sandeep 16* (6); Kone Aziz 1/6 (1 over)

Eswatini won by 8 wickets
Nigeria Cricket Federation Oval 2, Abuja
Umpires: Sarah Dambanevana (Zim) and Aasif Iqbal (UAE)
Player of the match: Rohan Sandeep (Esw)

- Ivory Coast won the toss and elected to bat.
- Ouattara Issouf (Civ) made his T20I debut.

28 November 2024
10:00
Scorecard

Ivory Coast; 26 (18.4 overs)	v	Saint Helena; 27/0 (2 overs)
Kouakou Wilfried 9 (42); Jordan Yon 4/3 (4 overs)		Andrew Yon 10* (6)

Saint Helena won by 10 wickets
Nigeria Cricket Federation Oval 1, Abuja
Umpires: David Odhiambo (Ken) and Claus Schumacher (Nam)
Player of the match: Jordan Yon (Shn)

- Ivory Coast won the toss and elected to bat.

28 November 2024
10:00
Scorecard

Sierra Leone; 155/8 (20 overs)	v	Eswatini; 46 (12.3 overs)
Lansana Lamin 52* (34); Adil Butt 3/34 (4 overs)		Rohan Sandeep 15*(13); George Ngegba 3/10 (4 overs)

Sierra Leone won by 109 runs
Nigeria Cricket Federation Oval 2, Abuja
Umpires: Andrew Louw (Nam) and Masudur Rahman (Ban)
Player of the match: Alusine Turay (Sle)

- Sierra Leone won the toss and elected to bat.

28 November 2024
14:15
Scorecard

Nigeria; 181/5 (20 overs)	v	Botswana; 104 (18.2 overs)
Isaac Danladi 80 (45); Thatayaone Tshose 2/14 (2 overs)		Karabo Motlhanka 48 (37); Ridwan Abdulkareem 6/22 (4 overs)

Nigeria won by 77 runs
Nigeria Cricket Federation Oval 1, Abuja
Umpires: Sarah Dambanevana (Zim) and Aasif Iqbal (UAE)
Player of the match: Ridwan Abdulkareem (Nga)

- Nigeria won the toss and elected to bat.
