= 2025 Men's T20 World Cup Africa Regional Final =

Qualifying tournament for the 2026 T20WC

2025 ICC Men's T20 World Cup Africa Regional Final
- Dates: 26 September – 4 October 2025
- Administrator: Africa Cricket Association
- Cricket format: Twenty20 International
- Tournament format(s): Group round-robin and Playoffs
- Host: Zimbabwe
- Champions: Zimbabwe (1st title)
- Runners-up: Namibia
- Participants: 8
- Matches: 20
- Most runs: (Zimbabwe) Brian Bennett (314)
- Most wickets: (Namibia) Jan Nicol Loftie-Eaton (10) (Zimbabwe) Brad Evans (10) (Zimbabwe) Richard Ngarava (10)

The 2025 ICC Men's T20 World Cup Africa Regional Final was a cricket tournament that formed part of the qualification process for the 2026 Men's T20 World Cup. It was played in Zimbabwe from 26 September to 4 October 2025.

The top two sides in the tournament join South Africa in the 2026 T20 World Cup who had pre-qualified as one of the top eight teams from the previous edition. Namibia and Zimbabwe secured their places at the 2026 T20 World Cup.

== Teams and qualification ==
In this cycle, a total of 18 teams participated in the African sub-regional phase, which was divided into three events with six teams competing in each event.

The top two sides of each sub-regional qualifier advanced to the regional final, where they joined Namibia and Uganda who received a bye after participating in the 2024 ICC Men's T20 World Cup.

Method of qualification	Date	Venue(s)	No. of teams	Team
2024 ICC Men's T20 World Cup	29 June 2024	United States; West Indies	2	Namibia
2024 ICC Men's T20 World Cup	29 June 2024	United States; West Indies	2	Uganda
Africa Qualifier A	21–26 September 2024	Tanzania	2	Malawi
Africa Qualifier A	21–26 September 2024	Tanzania	2	Tanzania
Africa Qualifier B	19–24 October 2024	Kenya	2	Kenya
Africa Qualifier B	19–24 October 2024	Kenya	2	Zimbabwe
Africa Qualifier C	23–28 November 2024	Nigeria	2	Botswana
Africa Qualifier C	23–28 November 2024	Nigeria	2	Nigeria
Total			8	

== Squads ==
Botswana	Kenya	Malawi	Namibia	Nigeria	Tanzania	Uganda	Zimbabwe
Karabo Motlhanka (c); Vinoo Balakrishnan; Monroux Kasselman; Botlhe Keganne; Boemo Kgosiemang; Boemo Khumalo; Dhruv Maisuria; Losika Makgale; Karabo Modise; Abednico Motshegetsi; Reginald Nehonde; Tharindu Perera; Katlo Piet; Jack Richards; Thatayaone Tshose	Dhiren Gondaria (c); Sachin Bhudia; Sachin Gill; Nitish Hirani; Jasraj Kundi; Peter Langat; Neil Mugabe; Francis Mutua; Lucas Oluoch; Rakep Patel; Rushab Patel; Vishil Patel; Vraj Patel; Pushkar Sharma; Sukhdeep Singh	Moazzam Baig (c); Sami Sohail (vc); Bright Balala; Chisomo Chete (wk); Mike Choamba; Daniel Jakiel; Donnex Kansonkho; Gift Kansonkho; Aaftab Limdawala; Trust Makaya; Salim Nihute; Kazim Somani; Chisomo Tchale; Kelvin Thuchila; Suhail Vayani	Gerhard Erasmus (c); Jan Balt; Jack Brassell; Jan-Izak de Villiers; Jan Frylinck; Zane Green (wk); Malan Kruger; Dylan Leicher; Nicol Loftie-Eaton; Bernard Scholtz; Ben Shikongo; JJ Smit; Louren Steenkamp; Ruben Trumpelmann; Alexander Busing-Volschenk	Sylvester Okpe (c); Ridwan Abdulkareem; Sesan Adedeji; Vincent Adewoye; Peter Aho; David Ankrah; Joshua Asia; Solomon Chilemanya (wk); Isaac Danladi; Abdulrahman Jimoh; Isaac Okpe; Sulaimon Runsewe; Selim Salau; Chiemelie Udekwe; Prosper Useni	Kassim Nassoro (c); Laksh Bakrania (vc); Ajith Augastin; Khalidy Juma; Salum Jumbe; Ally Kimote; Simba Mbaki; Dhrumit Mehta; Yalinde Nkanya; Abhik Patwa; Amal Rajeevan (wk); Ivan Selemani; Sivaraj Selvaraj; Mukesh Suthar; Arun Yadav	Riazat Ali Shah (c); Joseph Baguma; Raghav Dhawan; Cyrus Kakuru (wk); Cosmas Kyewuta; Ronald Lutaaya; ~~Shrideep Mangela~~; Juma Miyagi; Innocent Mwebaze; Dinesh Nakrani; Frank Nsubuga; Robinson Obuya; Alpesh Ramjani; Henry Ssenyondo; Gaurav Tomar (wk); Sumeet Verma	Sikandar Raza (c); Brian Bennett; Ryan Burl; Brad Evans; Trevor Gwandu; Clive Madande; Tinotenda Maposa; Tadiwanashe Marumani (wk); Wellington Masakadza; Tony Munyonga; Tashinga Musekiwa; Blessing Muzarabani; Dion Myers; Richard Ngarava; Brendan Taylor (wk); ~~Sean Williams~~

Shrideep Mangela was ruled out of Uganda's squad due to injury, and was replaced by Ronald Lutaaya.

On 26 September, Sean Williams was released from Zimbabwe squad for his personal reasons and was replaced by Clive Madande.

== Warm-up matches ==
Warm-up matches

22 September 2025
09:30
Scorecard

Kenya; 96/8 (20 overs)	v	Zimbabwe; 100/1 (12.2 overs)
Rakep Patel 24 (25); Brad Evans 3/26 (4 overs)		Brian Bennett 33* (25); Lucas Oluoch 1/21 (2 overs)

Zimbabwe won by 9 wickets
Harare Sports Club, Harare
Umpires: Tafadzwa Muzarawetu (Zim) and David Shawane (Zim)
Player of the match: Brad Evans (Zim)

- Kenya won the toss and elected to bat.

22 September 2025
09:30
Scorecard

Botswana; 150/4 (20 overs)	v	Malawi; 95 (19.3 overs)
Reginald Nehonde 62* (44); Kelvin Thuchila 2/17 (4 overs)		Aaftab Limdawala 15 (8); Tharindu Perera 3/7 (1.3 overs)

Botswana won by 55 runs
Takashinga Cricket Club, Harare
Umpires: Stanley Gadzikwa (Zim) and Tafadzwa Musakwa (Zim)
Player of the match: Reginald Nehonde (Bot)

- Malawi won the toss and elected to field.

22 September 2025
13:50
Scorecard

Namibia; 205/6 (20 overs)	v	Uganda; 112/8 (20 overs)
JJ Smit 58* (36); Alpesh Ramjani 2/27 (3 overs)		Alpesh Ramjani 18 (15); Alexander Busing-Volschenk 2/12 (2 overs)

Namibia won by 93 runs
Harare Sports Club, Harare
Umpires: Tafadzwa Muzarawetu (Zim) and David Shawane (Zim)
Player of the match: JJ Smit (Nam)

- Namibia won the toss and elected to bat.

22 September 2025
13:50
Scorecard

Nigeria; 83 (17.4 overs)	v	Tanzania; 84/9 (19.2 overs)
Isaac Danladi 31 (33); Laksh Bakrania 3/11 (4 overs)		Abhik Patwa 22 (37); Peter Aho 3/15 (3.2 overs)

Tanzania won by 1 wicket
Takashinga Cricket Club, Harare
Umpires: Stanley Gadzikwa (Zim) and Tafadzwa Musakwa (Zim)
Player of the match: Laksh Bakrania (Tan)

- Nigeria won the toss and elected to bat.

24 September 2025
09:30
Scorecard

Kenya; 139 (18.4 overs)	v	Tanzania; 142/4 (18.5 overs)
Dhiren Gondaria 52 (40); Khalidy Juma 3/10 (3 overs)		Ajith Augastin 50 (39); Sachin Gill 2/12 (3 overs)

Tanzania won by 6 wickets
Harare Sports Club, Harare
Umpires: Tafadzwa Muzarawetu (Zim) and Tafadzwa Musakwa (Zim)
Player of the match: Khalidy Juma (Tan)

- Kenya won the toss and elected to bat.

24 September 2025
09:30
Scorecard

Botswana; 85/7 (20 overs)	v	Namibia; 86/0 (7.1 overs)
Reginald Nehonde 29* (49); Jack Brassell 2/10 (4 overs)		Jan Frylinck 51* (27)

Namibia won by 10 wickets
Takashinga Cricket Club, Harare
Umpires: Stanley Gadzikwa (Zim) and David Shawane (Zim)
Player of the match: Jan Frylinck (Nam)

- Botswana won the toss and elected to bat.

24 September 2025
13:50
Scorecard

Zimbabwe; 177/5 (20 overs)	v	Nigeria; 130/9 (20 overs)
Tashinga Musekiwa 32* (19); Peter Aho 2/12 (2 overs)		Vincent Adewoye 40 (29); Sikandar Raza 3/15 (4 overs)

Zimbabwe won by 47 runs
Harare Sports Club, Harare
Umpires: Panashe Marovatsanga (Zim) and Tafadzwa Musakwa (Zim)
Player of the match: Sikandar Raza (Zim)

- Zimbabwe won the toss and elected to bat.

24 September 2025
13:50
Scorecard

Malawi; 67 (15.3 overs)	v	Uganda; 69/3 (7.3 overs)
Sami Sohail 13 (25); Joseph Baguma 4/18 (4 overs)		Raghav Dhawan 45* (28); Daniel Jakiel 1/3 (1 over)

Uganda won by 7 wickets
Takashinga Cricket Club, Harare
Umpires: Stanley Gadzikwa (Zim) and David Shawane (Zim)
Player of the match: Joseph Baguma (Uga)

- Malawi won the toss and elected to bat.

== Group stage ==
=== Group A ===
Group A standings
Pos	Team	Pld	W	L	NR	Pts	NRR	Qualification
1	Namibia	3	3	0	0	6	6.556	Advanced to the semi-final
2	Kenya	3	1	2	0	2	−1.553	Advanced to the semi-final
3	Nigeria	3	1	2	0	2	−1.822	Advanced to the play-offs
4	Malawi	3	1	2	0	2	−2.613	Advanced to the play-offs

Source: ESPNcricinfo

26 September 2025
09:30
Scorecard

Namibia; 241/5 (20 overs)	v	Kenya; 105/7 (20 overs)
JJ Smit 111* (39); Dhiren Gondaria 2/15 (2 overs)		Sukhdeep Singh 34 (36); Alexander Busing-Volschenk 2/11 (3 overs)

Namibia won by 136 runs
Harare Sports Club, Harare
Umpires: Iknow Chabi (Zim) and Lubabalo Gcuma (SA)
Player of the match: JJ Smit (Nam)

- Kenya won the toss and elected to field.
- JJ Smit (Nam) scored his 1,000th run and first century in T20Is.

26 September 2025
09:30
Scorecard

Malawi; 88 (19.3 overs)	v	Nigeria; 92/1 (11.2 overs)
Suhail Vayani 27 (25); Ridwan Abdulkareem 3/24 (4 overs)		Sulaimon Runsewe 51* (44)

Nigeria won by 9 wickets
Takashinga Cricket Club, Harare
Umpires: Langton Rusere (Zim) and Claus Schumacher (Nam)
Player of the match: Ridwan Abdulkareem (Nga)

- Nigeria won the toss and elected to field.
- This was the first men's T20I to be played at the venue.

28 September 2025
09:30
Scorecard

Namibia; 235/6 (20 overs)	v	Nigeria; 118/9 (20 overs)
Jan Frylinck 134 (65); Isaac Danladi 4/22 (3 overs)		Sulaimon Runsewe 28 (30); Jan Nicol Loftie-Eaton 3/24 (4 overs)

Namibia won by 117 runs
Harare Sports Club, Harare
Umpires: Bongani Jele (SA) and Langton Rusere (Zim)
Player of the match: Jan Frylinck (Nam)

- Nigeria won the toss and elected to field.
- Jan Frylinck (Nam) scored his 1,000th run and his first century in T20Is.

28 September 2025
13:50
Scorecard

Malawi; 130/4 (20 overs)	v	Kenya; 127 (19.5 overs)
Sami Sohail 46 (42); Dhiren Gondaria 1/20 (4 overs); Sachin Gill 1/20 (4 overs)		Rakep Patel 46 (31); Kelvin Thuchila 2/16 (4 overs)

Malawi won by 3 runs
Takashinga Cricket Club, Harare
Umpires: Iknow Chabi (Zim) and Andrew Louw (Nam)
Player of the match: Sami Sohail (Mwi)

- Malawi won the toss and elected to bat.

30 September 2025
13:50
Scorecard

Malawi; 71 (16.2 overs)	v	Namibia; 72/2 (7.5 overs)
Gift Kansonkho 31* (31); Nicol Loftie-Eaton 4/10 (4 overs)		Malan Kruger 28 (11); Sami Sohail 2/42 (4 overs)

Namibia won by 8 wickets
Harare Sports Club, Harare
Umpires: Stephen Harris (SA) and David Odhiambo (Ken)
Player of the match: Nicol Loftie-Eaton (Nam)

- Malawi won the toss and elected to bat.

30 September 2025
13:50
Scorecard

Nigeria; 147/7 (20 overs)	v	Kenya; 148/3 (13.4 overs)
Isaac Danladi 53 (47); Lucas Oluoch 2/15 (3 overs)		Sachin Bhudia 57* (29); Sylvester Okpe 1/14 (1 over)

Kenya won by 7 wickets
Takashinga Cricket Club, Harare
Umpires: Andrew Louw (Nam) and Langton Rusere (Zim)
Player of the match: Sachin Bhudia (Ken)

- Nigeria won the toss and elected to bat.
- Nitish Hirani (Ken) made his T20I debut.

=== Group B ===
Group B standings
Pos	Team	Pld	W	L	NR	Pts	NRR	Qualification
1	Zimbabwe (H)	3	3	0	0	6	5.262	Advanced to the semi-final
2	Tanzania	3	2	1	0	4	−1.013	Advanced to the semi-final
3	Uganda	3	1	2	0	2	0.394	Advanced to the play-offs
4	Botswana	3	0	3	0	0	−5.198	Advanced to the play-offs

Source: ESPNcricinfo
(H) Host

26 September 2025
13:50
Scorecard

Uganda; 152/9 (20 overs)	v	Zimbabwe; 157/5 (17.3 overs)
Sumeet Verma 45 (32); Brad Evans 3/19 (3 overs)		Brian Bennett 72 (44); Juma Miyagi 2/42 (4 overs)

Zimbabwe won by 5 wickets
Harare Sports Club, Harare
Umpires: Stephen Harris (SA) and Andrew Louw (Nam)
Player of the match: Brian Bennett (Zim)

- Uganda won the toss and elected to bat first.
- Sumeet Verma (Uga) made his T20I debut.

26 September 2025
13:50
Scorecard

Botswana; 122/6 (20 overs)	v	Tanzania; 124/3 (13.5 overs)
Vinoo Balakrishnan 68 (54); Ally Kimote 2/18 (4 overs)		Arun Yadav 62 (32); Boemo Khumalo 2/23 (3 overs)

Tanzania won by 7 wickets
Takashinga Cricket Club, Harare
Umpires: Bongani Jele (SA) and David Odhiambo (Ken)
Player of the match: Arun Yadav (Tan)

- Botswana won the toss and elected to bat first.
- Sivaraj Selvaraj (Tan) made his T20I debut.
- Amal Rajeevan (Tan) scored his 1,000th run in T20Is.

28 September 2025
09:30
Scorecard

Tanzania; 128/6 (20 overs)	v	Uganda; 119/9 (20 overs)
Mukesh Suthar 45* (32); Alpesh Ramjani 2/15 (3 overs)		Raghav Dhawan 39 (37); Khalidy Juma 4/13 (4 overs)

Tanzania won by 9 runs
Takashinga Cricket Club, Harare
Umpires: Lubabalo Gcuma (SA) and Stephen Harris (SA)
Player of the match: Khalidy Juma (Tan)

- Uganda won the toss and elected to field.
- Gaurav Tomar (Uga) made his T20I debut.

28 September 2025
13:50
Scorecard

Zimbabwe; 259/5 (20 overs)	v	Botswana; 89/8 (20 overs)
Brendan Taylor 123 (54); Boemo Kgosiemang 2/50 (4 overs)		Tharindu Perera 31* (32); Richard Ngarava 2/10 (2 overs)

Zimbabwe won by 170 runs
Harare Sports Club, Harare
Umpires: David Odhiambo (Ken) and Claus Schumacher (Nam)
Player of the match: Brendan Taylor (Zim)

- Botswana won the toss and elected to field.
- Brendan Taylor (Zim) scored his first century in T20Is.
- Botlhe Keganne (Bot) made his T20I debut.

30 September 2025
09:30
Scorecard

Zimbabwe; 221/5 (20 overs)	v	Tanzania; 108 (18.4 overs)
Brian Bennett 111 (60); Khalidy Juma 2/39 (4 overs)		Abhik Patwa 32 (22); Brad Evans 4/16 (4 overs)

Zimbabwe won by 113 runs
Harare Sports Club, Harare
Umpires: Stephen Harris (SA) and Claus Schumacher (Nam)
Player of the match: Brian Bennett (Zim)

- Tanzania won the toss and elected to field.
- Brian Bennett (Zim) scored his first century in T20Is.

30 September 2025
09:30
Scorecard

Botswana; 81/6 (20 overs)	v	Uganda; 85/2 (12.4 overs)
Vinoo Balakrishnan 24 (22); Riazat Ali Shah 2/7 (2 overs)		Raghav Dhawan 54* (45); Boemo Kgosiemang 1/9 (1 over)

Uganda won by 8 wickets
Takashinga Cricket Club, Harare
Umpires: Lubabalo Gcuma (SA) and Bongani Jele (SA)
Player of the match: Raghav Dhawan (Uga)

- Uganda won the toss and elected to field.
- Abednico Motshegetsi and Jack Richards (Bot) both made their T20I debuts.

== Play-offs ==
5th place semi-final 1
2 October 2025
09:30
Scorecard

Nigeria; 166/8 (20 overs)	v	Botswana; 122/7 (20 overs)
Vincent Adewoye 42 (18); Boemo Kgosiemang 3/26 (4 overs)		Katlo Piet 22* (20); Joshua Asia 4/11 (4 overs)

Nigeria won by 44 runs
Takashinga Cricket Club, Harare
Umpires: Iknow Chabi (Zim) and Claus Schumacher (Nam)
Player of the match: Joshua Asia (Nga)

- Nigeria won the toss and elected to bat.

5th place semi-final 2
2 October 2025
13:50
Scorecard

Uganda; 192/3 (20 overs)	v	Malawi; 75/6 (20 overs)
Sumeet Verma 88 (41); Kelvin Thuchila 1/8 (3 overs)		Aaftab Limdawala 22 (39); Alpesh Ramjani 4/13 (4 overs)

Uganda won by 117 runs
Takashinga Cricket Club, Harare
Umpires: Iknow Chabi (Zim) and David Odhiambo (Ken)
Player of the match: Sumeet Verma (Uga)

- Uganda won the toss and elected to bat.
- Alpesh Ramjani (Uga) took his 100th wicket in T20Is.

7th place play-off
4 October 2025
09:30
Scorecard

Malawi; 151/5 (20 overs)	v	Botswana; 95/9 (20 overs)
Suhail Vayani 30* (21); Botlhe Keganne 2/15 (3 overs)		Tharindu Perera 19 (20); Moazzam Baig 4/10 (4 overs)

Malawi won by 56 runs
Takashinga Cricket Club, Harare
Umpires: Andrew Louw (Nam) and Langton Rusere (Zim)
Player of the match: Moazzam Baig (Mwi)

- Malawi won the toss and elected to bat.

5th place play-off
4 October 2025
13:50
Scorecard

Uganda; 196/7 (20 overs)	v	Nigeria; 130/7 (20 overs)
Riazat Ali Shah 66* (30); Sylvester Okpe 2/31 (4 overs)		Sylvester Okpe 29* (27); Henry Ssenyondo 3/12 (4 overs)

Uganda won by 66 runs
Takashinga Cricket Club, Harare
Umpires: David Odhiambo (Ken) and Claus Schumacher (Nam)
Player of the match: Riazat Ali Shah (Uga)

- Uganda won the toss and elected to bat.

== Finals ==
Semi-final 1
2 October 2025
09:30
Scorecard

Namibia; 174/6 (20 overs)	v	Tanzania; 111/8 (20 overs)
JJ Smit 61* (43); Khalidy Juma 2/29 (4 overs)		Abhik Patwa 31 (31); JJ Smit 3/16 (4 overs)

Namibia won by 63 runs
Harare Sports Club, Harare
Umpires: Bongani Jele (SA) and Langton Rusere (Zim)
Player of the match: JJ Smit (Nam)

- Tanzania won the toss and elected to field.

Semi-final 2
2 October 2025
13:50
Scorecard

Kenya; 122/6 (20 overs)	v	Zimbabwe; 123/3 (15 overs)
Rakep Patel 65 (47); Blessing Muzarabani 2/19 (4 overs)		Brian Bennett 51 (25); Vraj Patel 2/29 (4 overs)

Zimbabwe won by 7 wickets
Harare Sports Club, Harare
Umpires: Lubabalo Gcuma (SA) and Andrew Louw (Nam)
Player of the match: Brian Bennett (Zim)

- Kenya won the toss and elected to bat.

3rd place play-off
4 October 2025
09:30
Scorecard

Kenya; 142/7 (20 overs)	v	Tanzania; 91 (17.2 overs)
Dhiren Gondaria 60 (53); Laksh Bakrania 2/20 (4 overs)		Amal Rajeevan 39 (37); Nitish Hirani 4/21 (4 overs)

Kenya won by 51 runs
Harare Sports Club, Harare
Umpires: Iknow Chabi (Zim) and Bongani Jele (SA)
Player of the match: Dhiren Gondaria (Ken)

- Tanzania won the toss and elected to field.
- Simba Mbaki (Tan) made his T20I debut.

Final
4 October 2025
13:50
Scorecard

Namibia; 167/6 (20 overs)	v	Zimbabwe; 171/3 (19.2 overs)
Louren Steenkamp 40 (27); Richard Ngarava 3/26 (4 overs)		Tadiwanashe Marumani 74* (61); Bernard Scholtz 2/21 (4 overs)

Zimbabwe won by 7 wickets
Harare Sports Club, Harare
Umpires: Lubabalo Gcuma (SA) and Stephen Harris
Player of the match: Tadiwanashe Marumani (Zim)

- Zimbabwe won the toss and elected to field.
- Richard Ngarava became the first Zimbabwean bowler to take 100 wickets in men's T20Is.

== Final standings ==
Pos.	Team	Remarks
1	Zimbabwe	Qualified for the 2026 Men's T20 World Cup
2	Namibia	Qualified for the 2026 Men's T20 World Cup
3	Kenya	
4	Tanzania	
5	Uganda	
6	Nigeria	
7	Malawi	
8	Botswana	
