= Cricket at the 2023 African Games – Men's tournament =

2023 African Games cricket event

- Dates: 17 – 23 March 2024
- Administrator: Association of National Olympic Committees of Africa
- Cricket format: Twenty20 International (Note: Matches involving the South African or Zimbabwean sides did not have T20I status.)
- Tournament format(s): Group round-robin and playoffs
- Host: Ghana
- Champions: Zimbabwe (1st title)
- Runners-up: Namibia
- Third place: Uganda
- Participants: 8
- Matches: 16
- Player of the series: (Zimbabwe) Owen Muzondo
- Most runs: (Uganda) Roger Mukasa (230)
- Most wickets: (Uganda) Alpesh Ramjani (13)

The men's cricket tournament at the 2023 African Games in Ghana took place from 17 to 23 March 2024. The matches were played in the Twenty20 International (T20I) format. Eight teams participated in the event, with all the matches held at the Achimota Oval grounds in Accra. Matches involving the South African team, which was composed of university players, were downgraded from T20I status on 19 March 2024, after the team had already played its first two matches. Zimbabwe were represented by an emerging side and their matches were also downgraded from T20I status.

Zimbabwe Emerging beat Namibia in the final, as Zimbabwe win the gold medal. Uganda beat Kenya in the bronze medal match.

== Squads ==
Squads

Ghana	Kenya	Namibia	Nigeria
Obed Harvey (c); Michael Aboagye; Daniel Anefie; Kelvin Awala; Richmond Baaleri; Kofi Bagabena; Godfred Bakiweyem; Rexford Bakum; Syed Aqeel Israr; Lee Nyarko; Alex Osei; Devender Singh; Joseph Theodore (wk); James Vifah; Philip Yevugah	Rakep Patel (c); Emmanuel Bundi; Peter Langat; Neil Mugabe; Francis Mutua; Gerard Mwendwa; Shem Ngoche; Collins Obuya; Nelson Odhiambo; Lucas Oluoch; Aarnav Patel; Vishil Patel; Gurdeep Singh; Sukhdeep Singh (wk)	Jan Nicol Loftie-Eaton (c); Jan Balt; Peter-Daniel Blignaut; Jack Brassell; Niko Davin; Shaun Fouché; Addo Iita; Junior Kariata; Handre Klazinge; JP Kotze (wk); Malan Kruger; Dylan Leicher; Ben Shikongo; Simon Shikongo; Gerhard Janse van Rensburg (wk)	Sylvester Okpe (c); Ridwan Abdulkareem; Sesan Adedeji; Vincent Adewoye; Peter Aho; Daniel Ajekun; Joshua Asia; Solomon Chilemanya; Isaac Danladi; Akhere Isesele; Isaac Okpe; Sulaimon Runsewe (wk); Mohameed Taiwo; Chiemelie Udekwe; Prosper Useni
University Sports South Africa	Tanzania	Uganda	Zimbabwe Emerging
George Van Heerden (c); Dylan Bester; Lehan Botha; Ethan Frosler; Kyle Glennister; Maahir Joseph; Keagan Lion-Cachet (wk); Orapeleng Motlhoaring; Lifa Ntanzi; Minenhle Ntobela; Heinrigh Pieterse; Jesse Prodehl; Lwandi Tywaku; Aphiwe Yako	Salum Jumbe (c); Sefu Athumani; Mohamed Issa; Abdallah Jabiri; Zamoyoni Jabeneke; Ally Kimote; Omary Kitunda (wk); Jumanne Masquater; Simba Mbaki; Kassim Nassoro; Yalinde Nkanya; Johnson Nyambo; Ivan Selemani; SanjayKumar Thakor	Brian Masaba (c); Fred Achelam (wk); Bilal Hassan; Cyrus Kakuru (wk); Cosmas Kyewuta; Ronald Lutaaya; Juma Miyagi; Roger Mukasa; Dinesh Nakrani; Robinson Obuya; Alpesh Ramjani; Henry Ssenyondo; Simon Ssesazi (wk); Kenneth Waiswa	Clive Madande (c, wk); Brian Bennett; Johnathan Campbell; Takudzwa Chataira; Alex Falao; Trevor Gwandu; Kudakwashe Macheka; Tadiwanashe Marumani; Wallace Mubayiwa; Ashley Mufandauya; Tony Munyonga; Rodney Mupfudza; Tashinga Musekiwa; Owen Muzondo; Nick Welch

== Group stage ==
=== Group A ===
==== Points table ====
Pos	Team	Pld	W	L	T	NR	Pts	NRR	Qualification
1	Uganda	3	3	0	0	0	6	3.283	Advanced to the knockout stage
2	Kenya	3	2	1	0	0	4	1.049	Advanced to the knockout stage
3	University Sports South Africa	3	1	2	0	0	2	1.000	
4	Ghana	3	0	3	0	0	0	−5.888	

Source: ESPNcricinfo

==== Fixtures ====
17 March 2024
13:50
Scorecard

University Sports South Africa; 237/2 (20 overs)	v	Ghana; 103/7 (20 overs)
George Van Heerden 107* (57); Godfred Bakiweyem 1/46 (4 overs)		James Vifah 41 (25); Jesse Prodehl 2/10 (4 overs)

University Sport South Africa won by 134 runs
Achimota Oval A, Accra
Umpires: Adil Kassam (Tan) and Patric Makumbi (Uga)
Player of the match: George Van Heerden (University Sports South Africa)

- University Sports South Africa won the toss and elected to bat.

17 March 2024
13:50
Scorecard

Uganda; 169/7 (20 overs)	v	Kenya; 97 (16.4 overs)
Roger Mukasa 59 (45); Lucas Oluoch 5/20 (4 overs)		Rakep Patel 42 (35); Alpesh Ramjani 4/17 (3.4 overs)

Uganda won by 72 runs
Achimota Oval B, Accra
Umpires: Iknow Chabi (Zim) and Habib Enesi (Nga)
Player of the match: Dinesh Nakrani (Uga)

- Uganda won the toss and elected to bat.
- Lucas Oluoch (Ken) took his first five-wicket haul in T20Is.
- Roger Mukasa (Uga) scored his 1,000th run in T20Is.

18 March 2024
13:50
Scorecard

Kenya; 141/6 (20 overs)	v	University Sports South Africa; 71 (15 overs)
Collins Obuya 58 (47); Heinrigh Pieterse 2/23 (4 overs)		George Van Heerden 22 (22); Aarnav Patel 5/15 (3 overs)

Kenya won by 70 runs
Achimota Oval A, Accra
Umpires: Adil Kassam (Tan) and Percival Sizara (Zim)
Player of the match: Aarnav Patel (Ken)

- Kenya won the toss and elected to bat.

18 March 2024
13:50
Scorecard

Uganda; 194/5 (20 overs)	v	Ghana; 73 (16 overs)
Simon Ssesazi 90 (50); Obed Harvey 5/36 (4 overs)		Richmond Baaleri 27 (35); Juma Miyagi 3/10 (3 overs)

Uganda won by 121 runs
Achimota Oval B, Accra
Umpires: Sarah Dambanevana (Zim) and Isaac Oyieko (Ken)
Player of the match: Simon Ssesazi (Uga)

- Uganda won the toss and elected to bat.
- Lee Nyarko (Gha) made his T20I debut.
- Obed Harvey (Gha) took his first five-wicket haul in T20Is.

20 March 2024
09:30
Scorecard

University Sports South Africa; 95/9 (20 overs)	v	Uganda; 99/8 (20 overs)
George Van Heerden 44 (45); Bilal Hassan 4/10 (4 overs)		Roger Mukasa 41 (54); Lehan Botha 2/15 (4 overs)

Uganda won by 2 wickets
Achimota Oval A, Accra
Umpires: Sarah Dambanevana (Zim) and Percival Sizara (Zim)
Player of the match: Roger Mukasa (Uga)

- University Sports South Africa won the toss and elected to bat.

20 March 2024
09:30
Scorecard

Ghana; 111 (18.3 overs)	v	Kenya; 115/3 (11.1 overs)
Obed Harvey 33 (33); Rakep Patel 3/12 (4 overs)		Collins Obuya 68 (30); Richmond Baaleri 3/55 (4 overs)

Kenya won by 7 wickets
Achimota Oval B, Accra
Umpires: Habib Enesi (Nga) and Adil Kassam (Tan)
Player of the match: Collins Obuya (Ken)

- Ghana won the toss and elected to bat.
- Aarnav Patel (Ken) made his T20I debut.

=== Group B ===
==== Points table ====
Pos	Team	Pld	W	L	T	NR	Pts	NRR	Qualification
1	Zimbabwe Emerging	3	3	0	0	0	6	1.600	Advanced to knockout stage
2	Namibia	3	1	2	0	0	2	0.195	Advanced to knockout stage
3	Tanzania	3	1	2	0	0	2	−0.220	
4	Nigeria	3	1	2	0	0	2	−1.158	

Source: ESPNcricinfo

==== Fixtures ====
17 March 2024
09:30
Scorecard

Zimbabwe Emerging; 197/6 (20 overs)	v	Namibia; 162/8 (20 overs)
Brian Bennett 65 (39); Jan Nicol Loftie-Eaton 2/27 (4 overs)		Malan Kruger 46 (23); Tashinga Musekiwa 3/29 (4 overs)

Zimbabwe Emerging won by 35 runs
Achimota Oval A, Accra
Umpires: Stacy Lackay (SA) and Isaac Oyieko (Ken)
Player of the match: Owen Muzondo (Zim)

- Zimbabwe Emerging won the toss and elected to bat.

17 March 2024
09:30
Scorecard

Tanzania; 131/6 (20 overs)	v	Nigeria; 84 (18.3 overs)
Ivan Selemani 33 (34); Joshua Asia 3/18 (4 overs)		Sesan Adedeji 25 (33); Salum Jumbe 5/10 (3.3 overs)

Tanzania won by 47 runs
Achimota Oval B, Accra
Umpires: Sarah Dambanevana (Zim) and Percival Sizara (Zim)
Player of the match: Salum Jumbe (Tan)

- Tanzania won the toss and elected to bat.
- Salum Jumbe (Tan) took his first five-wicket haul in T20Is.

18 March 2024
09:30
Scorecard

Tanzania; 86 (19.5 overs)	v	Zimbabwe Emerging; 90/6 (16.3 overs)
Omary Kitunda 43 (40); Wallace Mubayiwa 3/12 (4 overs)		Clive Madande 42* (39); Ally Kimote 2/12 (3 overs)

Zimbabwe Emerging won by 4 wickets
Achimota Oval A, Accra
Umpires: Habib Enesi (Nga) and Stacy Lackay (SA)
Player of the match: Wallace Mubayiwa (Zim)

- Tanzania won the toss and elected to bat.

18 March 2024
09:30
Scorecard

Namibia; 121/7 (20 overs)	v	Nigeria; 126/7 (20 overs)
Dylan Leicher 42* (41); Isaac Danladi 2/10 (4 overs)		Isaac Danladi 28 (21); Jan Nicol Loftie-Eaton 3/20 (4 overs)

Nigeria won by 3 wickets
Achimota Oval B, Accra
Umpires: Iknow Chabi (Zim) and Patric Makumbi (Uga)
Player of the match: Isaac Danladi (Nga)

- Namibia won the toss and elected to bat.
- Jan Balt, Simon Shikongo and Gerhard Janse van Rensburg (Nam) all made their T20I debuts.

20 March 2024
13:50
Scorecard

Nigeria; 88 (17.4 overs)	v	Zimbabwe Emerging; 91/0 (16 overs)
Vincent Adewoye 19* (15); Owen Muzondo 3/11 (4 overs)		Tadiwanashe Marumani 47* (44)

Zimbabwe Emerging won by 10 wickets
Achimota Oval A, Accra
Umpires: Patric Makumbi (Uga) and Isaac Oyieko (Ken)
Player of the match: Owen Muzondo (Zim)

- Nigeria won the toss and elected to bat.

20 March 2024
13:50
Scorecard

Tanzania; 71/9 (20 overs)	v	Namibia; 72/3 (12.3 overs)
SanjayKumar Thakor 15 (28); Ben Shikongo 2/9 (4 overs)		JP Kotze 21* (22); Ally Kimote 2/20 (3.3 overs)

Namibia won by 7 wickets
Achimota Oval B, Accra
Umpires: Iknow Chabi (Zim) and Percival Sizara (Zim)
Player of the match: Ben Shikongo (Nam)

- Tanzania won the toss and elected to bat.

== Knockout stage ==
=== Bracket ===
Semi-finals
A1	Uganda	87/9 (20 overs)
B2	Namibia	111/7 (20 overs)
B1	Zimbabwe Emerging	196 (20 overs)
A2	Kenya	126 (19.3 overs)

Gold Medal match
B2	Namibia	113/7 (20 overs)
B1	Zimbabwe Emerging	114/2 (14.5 overs)
Bronze Medal match
A1	Uganda	206/6 (20 overs)
A2	Kenya	100/9 (20 overs)

=== Semi-finals ===
21 March 2024
09:00
Scorecard

Namibia; 111/7 (20 overs)	v	Uganda; 87/9 (20 overs)
Niko Davin 25 (25); Juma Miyagi 3/10 (2 overs)		Roger Mukasa 36 (43); Handre Klazinge 4/19 (4 overs)

Namibia won by 24 runs
Achimota Oval A, Accra
Umpires: Iknow Chabi (Zim) and Isaac Oyieko (Ken)
Player of the match: Handre Klazinge (Nam)

- Namibia won the toss and elected to bat.

21 March 2024
13:50
Scorecard

Zimbabwe Emerging; 196/5 (20 overs)	v	Kenya; 126 (19.3 overs)
Johnathan Campbell 42 (27); Vishil Patel 2/29 (3 overs)		Collins Obuya 52 (29); Owen Muzondo 4/19 (4 overs)

Zimbabwe Emerging won by 70 runs
Achimota Oval A, Accra
Umpires: Habib Enesi (Nga) and Adil Kassam (Tan)
Player of the match: Tashinga Musekiwa (Zim)

- Zimbabwe Emerging won the toss and elected to bat.

=== Bronze Medal match ===
23 March 2024
09:30
Scorecard

Uganda; 206/6 (20 overs)	v	Kenya; 100/9 (20 overs)
Simon Ssesazi 66 (44); Nelson Odhiambo 2/32 (3 overs)		Lucas Oluoch 19 (19); Cosmas Kyewuta 4/13 (4 overs)

Uganda won by 106 runs
Achimota Oval A, Accra
Umpires: Iknow Chabi (Zim) and Percival Sizara (Zim)
Player of the match: Cosmas Kyewuta (Uga)

- Uganda won the toss and elected to bat.

=== Gold Medal match ===
23 March 2024
13:50
Scorecard

Namibia; 113/7 (20 overs)	v	Zimbabwe Emerging; 114/2 (14.5 overs)
Dylan Leicher 29 (30); Owen Muzondo 1/10 (2 overs)		Tadiwanashe Marumani 58 (40); Peter-Daniel Blignaut 2/11 (2.5 overs)

Zimbabwe Emerging won by 8 wickets
Achimota Oval A, Accra
Umpires: Adil Kassam (Tan) and Isaac Oyieko (Ken)
Player of the match: Tadiwanashe Marumani (Zim)

- Namibia won the toss and elected to bat.

== See also ==
- Cricket at the 2023 African Games – Women's tournament
