= Sierra Leonean cricket team in Nigeria in 2021–22 =

International cricket tour

Sierra Leone cricket team in Nigeria in 2021–22
	Nigeria	Sierra Leone
- Dates: 19 – 26 October 2021
Captains	Joshua Ayannaike	Lansana Lamin

Twenty20 International series
- Results: Nigeria won the 6-match series 5–1
Most runs	Ashmit Shreshta (102)	John Bangura (120)
Most wickets	Sylvester Okpe (11)	Samuel Conteh (12)

The Sierra Leone cricket team toured Nigeria in October 2021 to play six Twenty20 International (T20I) matches at the University of Lagos (Unilag) Cricket Oval in the Akoka suburb of Lagos. The series provided both sides with preparation for the T20 World Cup Africa Qualifier in November 2021. The series also saw a resumption of the long-running cricketing rivalry between the two north-west African nations.

Sierra Leone stunned the hosts by winning the first T201 with a single scored off the last ball of their twenty overs. Nigeria levelled the series after another close finish in the second game, winning by just six runs. The third game was a more one-sided affair, with the hosts claiming a 69-run victory to lead the series 2–1 at the halfway stage. The fourth game resulted in another comfortable win for the hosts, this time by nine wickets. Nigeria sealed the series after winning the fifth game, during which Peter Aho took six wickets for just five runs, the best bowling figures in a T20I. Nigeria won the sixth and final T20I by 36 runs, taking the series 5–1.

== Squads ==
Nigeria	Sierra Leone
Joshua Ayannaike (c, wk); Ridwan Abdulkareem; Rasheed Abolarin; Sesan Adedeji; Peter Aho; Chima Akachukwu; Daniel Gim; Odion Isesele; Samuel Mba; Segun Ogundipe; Isaac Okpe; Sylvester Okpe; Olayinka Olaleye; Segun Olayinka; Ashmit Shreshta (wk); Prosper Useni	Lansana Lamin (c); Abu Kamara (vc); Chernoh Bah; John Bangura (wk); Samuel Conteh; Edmond Ernest; Abass Gbla; Arvind Kerai; Miniru Kpaka; Ibrahim Mansaray (wk); Osman Sankoh; George Sesay; Sulaiman Tarawally; Solomon Williams

== T20I series ==
=== 1st T20I ===
19 October 2021
12:00
Scorecard

Nigeria; 99 (20 overs)	v	Sierra Leone; 100/4 (20 overs)
Isaac Okpe 36 (27); Miniru Kpaka 4/11 (4 overs)		Lansana Lamin 28* (26); Sesan Adedeji 2/14 (2 overs)

Sierra Leone won by 6 wickets
University of Lagos Cricket Oval, Lagos
Umpires: Gasana Christian (Rwa) and Eugene King (Nga)
Player of the match: Miniru Kpaka (Sle)

- Sierra Leone won the toss and elected to field.
- Samuel Mba, Ashmit Shreshta (Nga), John Bangura, Samuel Conteh, Edmond Ernest, Abass Gbla, Abu Kamara, Arvind Kerai, Miniru Kpaka, Lansana Lamin, George Sesay, Sulaiman Tarawally and Solomon Williams (Sle) all made their T20I debuts.

=== 2nd T20I ===
20 October 2021
14:00
Scorecard

Nigeria; 102/7 (20 overs)	v	Sierra Leone; 96/9 (20 overs)
Ashmit Shreshta 24 (32); Samuel Conteh 5/17 (4 overs)		John Bangura 46 (48); Sylvester Okpe 3/12 (4 overs)

Nigeria won by 6 runs
University of Lagos Cricket Oval, Lagos
Umpires: Gasana Christian (Rwa) and Kehinde Olanbiwonnu (Nga)
Player of the match: Sylvester Okpe (Nga)

- Nigeria won the toss and elected to bat.
- Segun Ogundipe (Nga) and Osman Sankoh (Sle) both made their T20I debuts.
- Samuel Conteh became the first bowler for Sierra Leone to take a five-wicket haul in T20Is.

=== 3rd T20I ===
21 October 2021
14:00
Scorecard

Nigeria; 124/8 (20 overs)	v	Sierra Leone; 55 (16 overs)
Isaac Okpe 22 (18); Abu Kamara 2/12 (3 overs)		Miniru Kpaka 16* (12); Prosper Useni 3/7 (3 overs)

Nigeria won by 69 runs
University of Lagos Cricket Oval, Lagos
Umpires: Eugene King (Nga) and Kehinde Olanbiwonnu (Nga)
Player of the match: Sylvester Okpe (Nga)

- Sierra Leone won the toss and elected to field.
- Ibrahim Mansaray (Sle) made his T20I debut.

=== 4th T20I ===
23 October 2021
10:00
Scorecard

Sierra Leone; 84/5 (20 overs)	v	Nigeria; 85/1 (15.5 overs)
Abass Gbla 29* (17); Isaac Okpe 2/12 (4 overs)		Samuel Mba 40* (53); Edmond Ernest 1/12 (4 overs)

Nigeria won by 9 wickets
University of Lagos Cricket Oval, Lagos
Umpires: Oluwole Compagnie-Coker (Sle) and Gasana Christian (Rwa)
Player of the match: Rasheed Abolarin (Nga)

- Sierra Leone won the toss and elected to bat.

=== 5th T20I ===
24 October 2021
14:00
Scorecard

Nigeria; 90 (17.4 overs)	v	Sierra Leone; 71 (17.4 overs)
Chima Akachukwu 30 (24); George Sesay 3/8 (1.4 overs)		Samuel Conteh 34 (42); Peter Aho 6/5 (3.4 overs)

Nigeria won by 19 runs
University of Lagos Cricket Oval, Lagos
Umpires: Oluwole Compagnie-Coker (Sle) and Temitope Onikoyi (Nga)
Player of the match: Peter Aho (Nga)

- Nigeria won the toss and elected to bat.
- Peter Aho became the first bowler for Nigeria to take a five-wicket haul and a hat-trick in T20Is. His figures of 6/5 set a new world record in T20Is.

=== 6th T20I ===
26 October 2021
14:00
Scorecard

Nigeria; 134/8 (20 overs)	v	Sierra Leone; 98/9 (20 overs)
Sesan Adedeji 39 (30); Abass Gbla 5/16 (4 overs)		John Bangura 32 (26); Peter Aho 3/12 (4 overs)

Nigeria won by 36 runs
University of Lagos Cricket Oval, Lagos
Umpires: Oluwole Compagnie-Coker (Sle) and Temitope Onikoyi (Nga)
Player of the match: Peter Aho (Nga)

- Nigeria won the toss and elected to bat.
- Ridwan Abdulkareem, Segun Olayinka (Nga) and Chernoh Bah (Sle) all made their T20I debuts.
- Abass Gbla (Sle) took his first five-wicket haul in T20Is.
