= List of Ivory Coast Twenty20 International cricketers =

This is a list of Ivory Coast Twenty20 International cricketers.In April 2018, the ICC decided to grant full Twenty20 International (T20I) status to all its members. Therefore, all Twenty20 matches played between Ivory Coast and other ICC members after 1 January 2019 will have T20I status.

This list comprises all members of the Ivory Coast cricket team who have played at least one T20I match. It is initially arranged in the order in which each player won his first Twenty20 cap. Where more than one player will win his first Twenty20 cap in the same match, those players are listed alphabetically by surname (according to the name format used by Cricinfo).

Ivory Coast played their first match with T20I status on 23rd November 2024 against Sierra Leone during the 2024 Men's T20 World Cup Africa Sub-regional Qualifier C.

== Key ==
General

- ‡ – Captain
- † – Wicket-keeper
- First – Year of debut
- Last – Year of latest game
- Mat – Number of matches played

Batting

- Runs – Runs scored in career
- HS – Highest score
- Avg – Runs scored per dismissal
- * – Batsman remained not out
- 50 – Half-centuries scored
- 100 – Centuries scored

Bowling

- Balls – Balls bowled in career
- Wkt – Wickets taken in career
- BBI – Best bowling in an innings
- Ave – Average runs per wicket

Fielding

- Ca – Catches taken
- St – Stumpings affected

== List of players ==
Statistics are correct as of 30 May 2026.

Ivory Coast T20I cricketers
General					Batting				Bowling				Fielding		Ref
No.	Name	First	Last	Mat	Runs	HS	Avg	50	Balls	Wkt	BBI	Ave	Ca	St	Ref
1	Mimi Alex	2024	2026	10	18	5	1.80	0	121	3	2/14	66.66	0	0	
2	Kone Aziz	2024	2026	11	39	14*	3.90	0	186	9	2/21	32.00	3	0	
3	Dje Claude	2024	2026	10	33	8	3.30	0	85	1	1/47	178.00	1	0	
4	Pamba Dimitri	2024	2024	4	3	2*	1.00	0	48	1	1/45	88.00	0	0	
5	Ouattara Djakaridja	2024	2026	11	9	6*	1.00	0	90	1	1/8	160.00	2	0	
6	Ladji Ezechiel	2024	2024	4	4	4	1.33	0	54	0	–	–	0	0	
7	Maiga Ibrahim†	2024	2026	9	7	4	1.16	0	–	–	–	–	1	0	
8	Dosso Issiaka‡	2024	2026	11	19	10	1.72	0	–	–	–	–	0	0	
9	Ouattara Mohamed	2024	2026	11	41	13	3.72	0	3	0	–	–	1	0	
10	Kone Nagnama	2024	2026	6	8	7	1.60	0	24	1	1/47	47.00	1	0	
11	Kouakou Wilfried	2024	2026	10	42	18	4.20	0	126	5	1/8	51.40	0	0	
12	Assouan Roger	2024	2026	7	11	4	1.83	0	–	–	–	–	2	0	
13	Ouattara Issouf †	2024	2026	8	18	9	3.00	0	–	–	–	–	0	0	
14	Gouegouri Roland	2026	2026	5	0	0	0.00	0	30	0	–	–	0	0	
15	Kouassi Hermann	2026	2026	4	6	4	3.00	0	–	–	–	–	0	0	
