= List of Twenty20 International cricket hat-tricks =

A hat-trick in cricket is when a bowler takes three wickets from consecutive deliveries. It is a relatively rare event in men's Twenty20 International (T20I) cricket with only 97 occurrences in over 4,000 matches as of October 2026.

The first Twenty20 hat-trick was taken by Brett Lee of Australia, playing against Bangladesh in Cape Town in September 2007.

Rashid Khan, Lasith Malinga, Curtis Campher, Jason Holder, Waseem Yaqoob and Hernán Fennell are the only bowlers to take four wickets in four balls in T20Is, Khan achieving this feat against Ireland in February 2019, and Malinga repeating the achievement against New Zealand in September 2019. On 18 October 2021 at 2021 ICC Men's T20 World Cup, Campher achieved the feat against the Netherlands. On 30 January 2022, Holder achieved this feat against England.

On 6 August 2021, Nathan Ellis picked up three wickets off the last three balls of Bangladesh innings to become the first male cricketer to take a hat-trick on his debut in a T20I match.

== Chronological list of hat-tricks ==
Key
	Hat-trick taken in a World Cup match
	Hat-trick taken in debut match
(b)	Bowled
(c)	Caught
(c & b)	Caught and bowled
(lbw)	Leg before wicket
(st)	Stumped
†	Wicket-keeper
Result	Result for the team for which the hat-trick was taken

List of Twenty20 International cricket hat-tricks
No.	Bowler	For	Against	Wickets	Venue	Date	Result	Ref.
1	Brett Lee	Australia	Bangladesh	Shakib Al Hasan (c †Adam Gilchrist); Mashrafe Mortaza (b); Alok Kapali (lbw)	(South Africa) Newlands Cricket Ground, Cape Town	16 September 2007	Won	
2	Jacob Oram	New Zealand	Sri Lanka	Angelo Mathews (c & b); Malinga Bandara (c Brendon McCullum); Nuwan Kulasekara (c Neil Broom)	(Sri Lanka) R. Premadasa Stadium, Colombo	2 September 2009	Won	
3	Tim Southee (1/2)	New Zealand	Pakistan	Younis Khan (c Dean Brownlie); Mohammad Hafeez (c †Peter McGlashan); Umar Akmal (lbw)	(New Zealand) Eden Park, Auckland	26 December 2010	Won	
4	Thisara Perera	Sri Lanka	India	Hardik Pandya (c Sachithra Senanayake); Suresh Raina (c Dushmantha Chameera); Yuvraj Singh (c Danushka Gunathilaka)	(India) JSCA International Stadium Complex, Ranchi	12 February 2016	Lost	
5	Lasith Malinga (1/2)	Sri Lanka	Bangladesh	Mushfiqur Rahim (b); Mashrafe Mortaza (b); Mehedi Hasan (lbw)	(Sri Lanka) R. Premadasa Stadium, Colombo	6 April 2017	Lost	
6	Faheem Ashraf	Pakistan	Sri Lanka	Isuru Udana (c Hasan Ali); Mahela Udawatte (c Babar Azam); Dasun Shanaka (lbw)	(United Arab Emirates) Sheikh Zayed Cricket Stadium, Abu Dhabi	27 October 2017	Won	
7	Rashid Khan	Afghanistan	Ireland	Kevin O'Brien (c Shafiqullah); George Dockrell (c Mohammad Nabi); Shane Getkate (st †Shafiqullah); Simi Singh (lbw)	(India) Rajiv Gandhi International Cricket Stadium, Dehradun	24 February 2019	Won	
8	Lasith Malinga (2/2)	Sri Lanka	New Zealand	Colin Munro (b); Hamish Rutherford (lbw); Colin de Grandhomme (b); Ross Taylor (lbw)	(Sri Lanka) Pallekele International Cricket Stadium, Kandy	6 September 2019	Won	
9	Mohammad Hasnain	Pakistan	Sri Lanka	Bhanuka Rajapaksa (lbw); Dasun Shanaka (c Umar Akmal); Shehan Jayasuriya (c Ahmed Shehzad)	(Pakistan) Gaddafi Stadium, Lahore	5 October 2019	Lost	
10	Khawar Ali	Oman	Netherlands	Antonius Staal (c Aqib Ilyas); Colin Ackermann (c Zeeshan Maqsood); Roelof van der Merwe (lbw)	Oman Cricket Academy Ground, Muscat	9 October 2019	Won	
11	Norman Vanua	Papua New Guinea	Bermuda	Dion Stovell (b); Kamau Leverock (c †Kiplin Doriga); Deunte Darrell (lbw)	(United Arab Emirates) ICC Academy Ground, Dubai	19 October 2019	Won	
12	Deepak Chahar	India	Bangladesh	Shafiul Islam (c K. L. Rahul); Mustafizur Rahman (c Shreyas Iyer); Aminul Islam (b)	(India) Vidarbha Cricket Association Stadium, Nagpur	10 November 2019	Won	
13	Ashton Agar	Australia	South Africa	Faf du Plessis (c Kane Richardson); Andile Phehlukwayo (lbw); Dale Steyn (c Aaron Finch)	(South Africa) Wanderers Stadium, Johannesburg	21 February 2020	Won	
14	Akila Dananjaya	Sri Lanka	West Indies	Evin Lewis (c Danushka Gunathilaka); Chris Gayle (lbw); Nicholas Pooran (c †Niroshan Dickwella)	(Antigua and Barbuda) Coolidge Cricket Ground, Antigua	3 March 2021	Lost	
15	Waseem Abbas (1/2)	Malta	Belgium	Ashiqullah Said (c [sub] Gopal Chaturvedi); Khalid Ahmadi (b); Nemish Mehta (b)	(Malta) Marsa Sports Club, Marsa	8 July 2021	Won	
16	Sheraz Sheikh	Belgium	Malta	Amar Sharma (c Saber Zakhil); Niraj Khanna (c Nemish Mehta); Varun Thamotharam (c Shaheryar Butt)	(Malta) Marsa Sports Club, Marsa	9 July 2021	Won	
17	Nathan Ellis	Australia	Bangladesh	Mahmudullah (b); Mustafizur Rahman (c Mitchell Marsh); Mahedi Hasan (c Ashton Agar)	(Bangladesh) Sher-e-Bangla National Cricket Stadium, Mirpur	6 August 2021	Lost	
18	Elijah Otieno	Kenya	Uganda	Deusdedit Muhumuza (c Rushab Patel); Kenneth Waiswa (lbw); Bilal Hassan (c Rushab Patel)	(Uganda) Entebbe Cricket Oval, Entebbe	17 September 2021	Lost	
19	Kofi Bagabena	Ghana	Seychelles	Stephen Madusanka (b); Mazharul Islam (lbw); Sivakumar Udhayan (lbw)	(Rwanda) Gahanga International Cricket Stadium, Kigali	17 October 2021	Won	
20	Curtis Campher	Ireland	Netherlands	Colin Ackermann (c †Neil Rock); Ryan ten Doeschate (lbw); Scott Edwards (lbw); Roelof van der Merwe (b)	(United Arab Emirates) Sheikh Zayed Cricket Stadium, Abu Dhabi	18 October 2021	Won	
21	Dylan Blignaut	Germany	Italy	Jaspreet Singh (c Sahir Naqash); Joy Perera (c Muslim Yar); Baljit Singh (c Ghulam Ahmadi)	(Spain) Desert Springs Cricket Ground, Almería	21 October 2021	Lost	
22	Dinesh Nakrani	Uganda	Seychelles	Paul Byron (b); Vadodariya Mukesh (b); Sohail Rocket (b)	(Rwanda) IPRC Cricket Ground, Kigali	22 October 2021	Won	
23	Peter Aho	Nigeria	Sierra Leone	Abu Kamara (lbw); Miniru Kpaka (b); Edmond Earnest (b)	(Nigeria) University of Lagos Cricket Oval, Lagos	24 October 2021	Won	
24	Wanindu Hasaranga	Sri Lanka	South Africa	Aiden Markram (b); Temba Bavuma (c Pathum Nissanka); Dwaine Pretorius (c Bhanuka Rajapaksa)	(United Arab Emirates) Sharjah Cricket Stadium, Sharjah	30 October 2021	Lost	
25	Kagiso Rabada	South Africa	England	Chris Woakes (c Anrich Nortje); Eoin Morgan (c Keshav Maharaj); Chris Jordan (c David Miller)	(United Arab Emirates) Sharjah Cricket Stadium, Sharjah	6 November 2021	Won	
26	Hernán Fennell (1/2)	Argentina	Panama	Mahmud Jasat (c Tomas Rossi); Anilkumar Natubhai Ahir (lbw); Dineshbhai Ahir (b)	(Antigua and Barbuda) Sir Vivian Richards Stadium, Antigua	10 November 2021	Won	
27	Jason Holder	West Indies	England	Chris Jordan (c [sub] Hayden Walsh Jr); Sam Billings (c [sub] Hayden Walsh Jr); Adil Rashid (c Odean Smith); Saqib Mahmood (b)	(Barbados) Kensington Oval, Bridgetown	30 January 2022	Won	
28	Karan KC	Nepal	Papua New Guinea	Chad Soper (c Rohit Paudel); Simon Atai (b); Nosaina Pokana (c Dipendra Singh Airee)	(Nepal) TU Cricket Ground, Kirtipur	31 March 2022	Won	
29	JJ Smit	Namibia	Uganda	Simon Ssesazi (c Jan Frylinck); Frank Nsubuga (b); Juma Miyagi (lbw)	(Namibia) United Ground, Windhoek	10 April 2022	Won	
30	Khalid Ahmadi (1/2)	Belgium	Malta	Imran Ameer (b); Aaftab Alam Khan (b); Varun Thamotharam (b)	(Belgium) Royal Brussels Cricket Club, Waterloo	12 June 2022	Won	
31	Syazrul Idrus	Malaysia	Thailand	Sorawat Desungnoen (b); Jeerasak Pakhiaokajee (lbw); Chaloemwong Chatphaisan (lbw)	(Malaysia) UKM-YSD Cricket Oval, Bangi	4 July 2022	Won	
32	Kamron Senamontree	Thailand	Maldives	Ibrahim Hassan (lbw); Ibrahim Rizan (lbw); Leem Shafeeg (b)	(Malaysia) UKM-YSD Cricket Oval, Bangi	8 July 2022	Lost	
33	Logan van Beek	Netherlands	Hong Kong	Nizakat Khan (c Stephan Myburgh); Scott McKechnie (lbw); Ehsan Khan (lbw)	(Zimbabwe) Queens Sports Club, Bulawayo	12 July 2022	Won	
34	Chamal Sadun	Cyprus	Turkey	Gokhan Alta (lbw); Ali Turkmen (b); Tunahan Ulutuna (b)	(Finland) Tikkurila Cricket Ground, Vantaa	16 July 2022	Won	
35	Michael Bracewell	New Zealand	Ireland	Mark Adair (c Glenn Phillips); Barry McCarthy (c Glenn Phillips); Craig Young (c Ish Sodhi)	(Northern Ireland) Stormont, Belfast	20 July 2022	Won	
36	Sudesh Wickramasekara	Czech Republic	Estonia	Habib Khan (b); Maidul Islam (b); Murali Obili (b)	(Finland) Tikkurila Cricket Ground, Vantaa	28 July 2022	Won	
37	Habib Khan	Estonia	France	Suventhiran Santhirakumaran (b); Zain Ahmad (c Stuart Hook); Jubaid Ahamed (b)	(Finland) Kerava National Cricket Ground, Kerava	30 July 2022	Lost	
38	Shahrukh Quddus	Kuwait	Bahrain	Umer Toor (lbw); Shahbaz Badar (lbw); Haider Butt (lbw)	Oman Cricket Academy Ground, Muscat	17 August 2022	Won	
39	Karthik Meiyappan	United Arab Emirates	Sri Lanka	Bhanuka Rajapaksa (c Kashif Daud); Charith Asalanka (c †Vriitya Aravind); Dasun Shanaka (b)	(Australia) Kardinia Park, Geelong	18 October 2022	Lost	
40	Josh Little	Ireland	New Zealand	Kane Williamson (c Gareth Delany); James Neesham (lbw); Mitchell Santner (lbw)	(Australia) Adelaide Oval, Adelaide	4 November 2022	Lost	
41	Tim Southee (2/2)	New Zealand	India	Hardik Pandya (c James Neesham); Deepak Hooda (c Lockie Ferguson); Washington Sundar (c James Neesham)	(New Zealand) Bay Oval, Mount Maunganui	20 November 2022	Lost	
42	Harsheed Chohan	Tanzania	Sierra Leone	Abass Gbla (lbw); Miniru Kpaka (c SanjayKumar Thakor); Lansana Lamin (lbw)	(Rwanda) Gahanga International Cricket Stadium, Kigali	1 December 2022	Won	
43	Rizwan Butt	Bahrain	Singapore	Avi Dixit (c †Prashant Kurup); Abdul Rahman Bhadelia (b); Vinoth Baskaran (c Ahmer Bin Nasir)	(Malaysia) UKM-YSD Cricket Oval, Bangi	21 December 2022	Won	
44	Mohammad Kamran (1/2)	Spain	Isle of Man	Luke Ward (b); Edward Beard (lbw); Christian Webster (b)	(Spain) La Manga Club Ground, Cartagena	26 February 2023	Won	
45	Matt Henry	New Zealand	Pakistan	Shadab Khan (c †Tom Latham); Iftikhar Ahmed (c †Tom Latham); Shaheen Afridi (c Chad Bowes)	(Pakistan) Gaddafi Stadium, Lahore	14 April 2023	Lost	
46	Saud Munir	Denmark	Norway	Qamar Mushtaque (c †Abdul Hashmi); Junaid Mehmood (lbw); Muhammad Butt (lbw)	(Denmark) Svanholm Park, Brøndby	18 May 2023	Won	
47	Mark Pavlovic (1/2)	Serbia	Turkey	Mecit Ozturk (c Alister Gajic); Muhammed Turkmen (c Vukasin Zimonjic); Muhammet Kursat (b)	(Bulgaria) National Sports Academy, Sofia	23 June 2023	Won	
48	Mark Pavlovic (2/2)	Serbia	Croatia	Luka Stubbs (b); Hrvoje Hajnic (b); Antonio Faletar (lbw)	(Bulgaria) National Sports Academy, Sofia	24 June 2023	Won	
49	Waseem Abbas (2/2)	Malta	France	Zain Ahmad (b); Shayam Warnakulasuriya (b); Dawood Ahmadzai (c †Chanjal Sudarsanan)	(Malta) Marsa Sports Club, Marsa	10 July 2023	Won	
50	Karim Janat	Afghanistan	Bangladesh	Mehidy Hasan Miraz (c Mohammad Nabi); Taskin Ahmed (c †Rahmanullah Gurbaz); Nasum Ahmed (c Fareed Ahmad)	(Bangladesh) Sylhet International Cricket Stadium, Sylhet	14 July 2023	Lost	
51	Kabua Morea	Papua New Guinea	Philippines	Jordan Alegre (lbw); Josef Doctora (b); Amanpreet Sirah (b)	(Papua New Guinea) Amini Park, Port Moresby	23 July 2023	Won	
52	Nicolaj Laegsgaard	Denmark	Jersey	Julius Sumerauer (c Musa Shaheen); Charles Perchard (b); Elliot Miles (c †Taranjit Bharaj)	(Scotland) Goldenacre Sports Ground, Edinburgh	28 July 2023	Lost	
53	Kenneth Waiswa	Uganda	Rwanda	Orchide Tuyisenge (c Brian Masaba); Clinton Rubagumya (lbw); Oscar Manishimwe (b)	Gahanga International Cricket Stadium, Rwanda	20 August 2023	Won	
54	Mohameed Taiwo	Nigeria	Sierra Leone	Raymond Coker (c Sylvester Okpe); Yegbeh Jalloh (c Akhere Isesele); Miniru Kpaka (c Chiemelie Udekwe)	(Nigeria) Tafawa Balewa Square Cricket Oval, Lagos	8 October 2023	Won	
55	Sikandar Raza	Zimbabwe	Rwanda	Muhammad Nadir (b); Zappy Bimenyimana (c Blessing Muzarabani); Emile Rukiriza (lbw)	(Namibia) Wanderers Cricket Ground, Windhoek	27 November 2023	Won	
56	George Sesay	Sierra Leone	Botswana	Reginald Nehonde (c †John Bangura); Reynier Swart (b); Dhruv Maisuria (b)	(South Africa) Willowmoore Park, Benoni	15 December 2023	Won	
57	Nuwan Thushara	Sri Lanka	Bangladesh	Najmul Hossain Shanto (b); Towhid Hridoy (b); Mahmudullah (lbw)	(Bangladesh) Sylhet International Cricket Stadium, Sylhet	9 March 2024	Won	
58	Aqib Ilyas	Oman	Cambodia	Vimukthi Viraj (c Kashyap Prajapati); Etienne Beukes (b); Sharwan Godara (b)	Oman Cricket Academy Ground Turf 2, Al Amarat	14 April 2024	Won	
59	Pat Cummins (1/2)	Australia	Bangladesh	Mahmudullah (b); Mahedi Hasan (c Adam Zampa); Towhid Hridoy (c Josh Hazlewood)	(Antigua and Barbuda) Sir Vivian Richards Stadium, North Sound	20 June 2024	Won	
60	Pat Cummins (2/2)	Australia	Afghanistan	Karim Janat (c Tim David); Rashid Khan (c Tim David); Gulbadin Naib (c Glenn Maxwell)	(Saint Vincent and the Grenadines) Arnos Vale Stadium, Arnos Vale	22 June 2024	Lost	
61	Chris Jordan	England	United States	Ali Khan (b); Nosthush Kenjige (lbw); Saurabh Netravalkar (b)	(Barbados) Kensington Oval, Bridgetown	23 June 2024	Won	
62	Waseem Yaqoob	Lesotho	Mali	Amara Nimaga (b); Dramane Berthe (b); Mahamadou Malle (lbw); Yacouba Konate (b)	(Tanzania) Gymkhana Club Ground, Dar es Salaam	25 September 2024	Won	
63	Obed Harvey	Ghana	Mali	Amadou Fofana (b); Lamissa Sanogo (c Lee Nyarko); Mahamadou Malle (lbw)	(Tanzania) Gymkhana Club Ground, Dar es Salaam	26 September 2024	Won	
64	Lockie Ferguson	New Zealand	Sri Lanka	Kusal Perera (c Mitchell Hay); Kamindu Mendis (lbw); Charith Asalanka (c Mitchell Hay)	(Sri Lanka) Rangiri Dambulla International Stadium, Dambulla	10 November 2024	Won	
65	Ridwan Abdulkareem	Nigeria	Saint Helena	Jamie Essex (lbw); Cliff Richards (c Sulaimon Runsewe); Branden Leo (lbw)	(Nigeria) University of Lagos Cricket Oval, Lagos	23 November 2024	Won	
66	Hernán Fennell (2/2)	Argentina	Cayman Islands	Troy Taylor (c Pedro Baron); Alistair Ifill (lbw); Ronald Ebanks (c Alan Kirschbaum); Alessandro Morris (c Agustin Rivero)	(Argentina) Hurlingham Club Ground, Buenos Aires	15 December 2024	Lost	
67	Sham Murari	Costa Rica	Falkland Islands	Sarfraz Rao (lbw); Cecil Alexander (c Pushkaraj Naringrekar); Juandre Scheffer (b)	(Costa Rica) Los Reyes Polo Club, Guácima	10 March 2025	Won	
68	Khalid Ahmadi (2/2)	Belgium	Portugal	Juan Henri (b); Siraj Ullah Khadem (b); Upen Shantu (b)	(Belgium) Stars Arena, Hofstade	1 June 2025	Won	
69	Arun Yadav	Tanzania	Germany	Hassan Khan (b); Fayaz Khan (lbw); Jatinder Kumar (lbw)	(Malawi) TCA Oval, Blantyre	7 July 2025	Lost	
70	Aaftab Limdawala	Malawi	Germany	Musaddiq Ahmed (c Bright Balala); Fayaz Khan (c & b); Muslim Yar (c & b)	(Malawi) TCA Oval, Blantyre	10 July 2025	Won	
71	Shahid Afridi	Germany	Malawi	Salim Nihute (c †Harish Srinivasan); Suhail Vayani (c Harmanjot Singh); Daniel Jakiel (b)	(Malawi) TCA Oval, Blantyre	13 July 2025	Won	
72	Waji Ul Hassan	Saudi Arabia	Qatar	Mujeeb-ur-Rehman (c Imtiaz Khan); Arif Nasir Uddin (b); Owais Ahmed (c & b)	(Qatar) West End Park International Cricket Stadium, Doha	18 July 2025	Lost	
73	Mahesh Tambe	Finland	Estonia	Steffan Gooch (c Nicholas Salonen); Rupam Baruah (b); Pranay Gheewala (b)	(Estonia) Estonian National Cricket and Rugby Field, Tallinn	27 July 2025	Won	
74	Mohammad Nawaz	Pakistan	Afghanistan	Darwish Rasooli (lbw); Azmatullah Omarzai (c †Mohammad Haris); Ibrahim Zadran (st † Mohammad Haris)	(United Arab Emirates) Sharjah Cricket Stadium, Sharjah	7 September 2025	Won	
75	Jan Nicol Loftie-Eaton	Namibia	Malawi	Moazzam Baig (b); Kazim Somani (b); Suhail Vayani (lbw); Mike Choamba (b)	(Zimbabwe) Harare Sports Club, Harare	30 September 2025	Won	
76	Owais Ahmed (1/2)	Qatar	Malaysia	Sharvin Muniandy (c & b); Khizar Hayat (lbw); Ainool Hafizs (c Mirza Mohammed Baig)	Oman Cricket Academy Ground Turf 2, Al Amarat	9 October 2025	Won	
77	Romario Shepherd (1/2)	West Indies	Bangladesh	Nurul Hasan (c Rovman Powell); Tanzid Hasan (c Jason Holder); Shoriful Islam (b)	(Bangladesh) Bir Shrestho Flight Lieutenant Matiur Rahman Cricket Stadium, Chittagong	31 October 2025	Won	
78	Owais Ahmed (2/2)	Qatar	Afghanistan	Mohammad Ishaq (b); Qais Ahmad (c Shahzaib Jamil); AM Ghazanfar (st † Imal Liyanage)	(Qatar) West End Park International Cricket Stadium, Doha	11 November 2025	Won	
79	Usman Tariq	Pakistan	Zimbabwe	Tony Munyonga (c Naseem Shah); Tashinga Musekiwa (b); Wellington Masakadza (c Babar Azam)	(Pakistan) Rawalpindi Cricket Stadium , Rawalpindi	23 November 2025	Won	
80	Lansana Lamin	Sierra Leone	Rwanda	Clinton Rubagumya (b); Zappy Bimenyimana (b); Ignace Ntirenganya (b)	Nigeria Cricket Federation Oval 1, Abuja	8 December 2025	Lost	
81	Gede Priandana	Indonesia	Cambodia	Shah Abrar Hussain (c Gede Wiguna); Nirmaljit Singh (c Vineet Shah); Chanthoeun Rathanak (b)	(Indonesia) Udayana Cricket Ground, Jimbaran	23 December 2025	Won	
82	Mujeeb Ur Rahman	Afghanistan	West Indies	Evin Lewis (lbw); Johnson Charles (b); Brandon King (c Darwish Rasooli)	(United Arab Emirates) Dubai International Cricket Stadium, Dubai	21 January 2026	Won	
83	Shamar Springer	West Indies	Afghanistan	Rahmanullah Gurbaz (c Matthew Forde); Rashid Khan (c Khary Pierre); Shahidullah Kamal (b)	(United Arab Emirates) Dubai International Cricket Stadium, Dubai	22 January 2026	Won	
84	Sam Curran	England	Sri Lanka	Dasun Shanaka (c Harry Brook); Maheesh Theekshana (c Jamie Overton); Matheesha Pathirana (b)	(Sri Lanka) Pallekele International Cricket Stadium, Kandy	30 January 2026	Won	
85	Romario Shepherd (2/2)	West Indies	Scotland	Matthew Cross (c Sherfane Rutherford); Michael Leask (c Rovman Powell); Oliver Davidson (b)	(India) Eden Gardens, Kolkata	7 February 2026	Won	
86	Sumeet Lahiri	Mexico	Costa Rica	Sachin Ravikumar (c Dhananjaya Panda); Sham Murari (b); Ashar Abbas (lbw)	(Mexico) Reforma Athletic Club, Naucalpan	4 April 2026	Won	
87	Vinay Ravi	Norway	France	Mohammad Khan Rafah (c Chaudhary Akram); Noman Amjad (c Khizer Ahmed); Zaheer Zahiri (c Syed Jawad Haider)	(Portugal) Santarem Cricket Ground, Santarém	7 April 2026	Won	
88	Amanpreet Sirah	Philippines	South Korea	Hyeon Parsons (c & b); Sameera Pitabeddara (c Josef Doctora); Sameera Maduranga (c Josef Doctora)	(Japan) Sano International Cricket Ground 2, Sano	12 May 2026	Won	
89	Jan Balt	Namibia	Nigeria	Sylvester Okpe (b); Chima Akachukwu (b); Mohameed Taiwo (lbw)	Namibia Cricket Ground, Windhoek	23 June 2026	Won	
90	Akhil Arjunan	Finland	Portugal	Jeremy Martins (c Mahesh Tambe); Hardeep Khuttan (c Nicholas Salonen); Edward Fleming (lbw)	(Finland) Kerava National Cricket Ground, Kerava	3 July 2026	Lost	
91	Luka Woods	Serbia	Gibraltar	Kayron J Stagno (c Wintley Burton); KIeron Ferray (lbw); Chris Pye (lbw)	(Denmark) Koge Cricket Club, Køge	12 July 2026	Lost	
92	Daniel Jakiel	Malawi	Rwanda	David Uwimana (b); Daniel Gumyusenge (c Suhail Vayani); Jean Iradukunda (lbw)	(Malawi) TCA Oval, Blantyre	14 August 2026	Won	
93	Mohammad Kamran (2/2)	Spain	Luxembourg	Shiv Gill (c Davidson Soler); William Cope (b); Vikram Vijh (lbw)	(Finland) Tikkurila Cricket Ground, Vantaa	17 August 2026	Won	
94	Abdul Majid	Bahrain	Myanmar	Nay Lin Htike (b); Nyein Cham Soe (b); Aung Ko Ko (lbw)	(Malaysia) Selangor Turf Club, Seri Kembangan	8 October 2026	Won	
95	Phanuphong Thongsa	Thailand	Mongolia	Temuulen Amarmend (b); Munkhsuld Erdenebat (b); Tumursukh Turmunkh (b)	(Malaysia) Bayuemas Oval, Pandamaran	9 October 2026	Won	
96	Ishtiaq Ahmad	Saudi Arabia	Hong Kong	Aizaz Khan (c † Manan Ali); Yasim Murtaza (c Muhammad Atif); Hassan Khan Mohammad (lbw)	(Malaysia) Bayuemas Oval, Pandamaran	11 October 2026	Won	
97	Ehsan Khan	Hong Kong	Singapore	Manpreet Singh (st † Zeeshan Ali); Akshay Puri (b); Jeevan Santhanam (c Aizaz Khan)	(Malaysia) Bayuemas Oval, Pandamaran	14 October 2026	Won	

== Hat-tricks by teams ==
T20I hat-tricks by teams
Team	Hat-tricks
New Zealand	6
Sri Lanka	6
Australia	5
Pakistan	4
West Indies	4
Afghanistan	3
Belgium	3
Namibia	3
Nigeria	3
Serbia	3
Argentina	2
Bahrain	2
Denmark	2
England	2
Finland	2
Germany	2
Ghana	2
Ireland	2
Malawi	2
Malta	2
Oman	2
Papua New Guinea	2
Qatar	2
Sierra Leone	2
Saudi Arabia	2
Spain	2
Tanzania	2
Thailand	2
Uganda	2
Costa Rica	1
Cyprus	1
Czech Republic	1
Estonia	1
Hong Kong	1
India	1
Indonesia	1
Kenya	1
Kuwait	1
Lesotho	1
Malaysia	1
Mexico	1
Nepal	1
Netherlands	1
Norway	1
Philippines	1
South Africa	1
United Arab Emirates	1
Zimbabwe	1
Total	97

== Bowlers with multiple T20I hat-tricks ==
Bowlers with multiple hat-tricks
Bowler	Hat-tricks
(Malta) Waseem Abbas	2
(Belgium) Khalid Ahmadi	2
(Australia) Pat Cummins	2
(Argentina) Hernán Fennell	2
(Sri Lanka) Lasith Malinga	2
(Serbia) Mark Pavlovic	2
(Cricket West Indies) Romario Shepherd	2
(New Zealand) Tim Southee	2
(Spain) Mohammad Kamran	2

== See also ==
- List of Test cricket hat-tricks
- List of One Day International cricket hat-tricks
- List of Twenty20 International records
