= List of Sierra Leone Twenty20 International cricketers =

This is a list of Sierra Leone Twenty20 International cricketers.

A Twenty20 International (T20I) is an international cricket match between two representative teams under the Twenty20 rules. In April 2018, the ICC decided to grant full T20I status to all its members. Therefore, all Twenty20 matches played between Sierra Leone and other ICC members after 1 January 2019 have the T20I status. Sierra Leone played their first T20I matches in October 2021 during a series against Nigeria in Lagos.

This list comprises names of all members of the Sierra Leone cricket team who have played at least one T20I match. It is initially arranged in the order in which each player won his first Twenty20 cap. Where more than one player won their first Twenty20 cap in the same match, those players are listed alphabetically by surname.

== Key ==
General

- ‡ – Captain
- † – Wicket-keeper
- First – Year of debut
- Last – Year of latest game
- Mat – Number of matches played

Batting

- Runs – Runs scored in career
- HS – Highest score
- Avg – Runs scored per dismissal
- * – Batsman remained not out
- 50 – Number of half centuries

Bowling

- Balls – Balls bowled in career
- Wkt – Wickets taken in career
- BBI – Best bowling in an innings
- Ave – Average runs per wicket

Fielding

- Ca – Catches taken
- St – Stumpings affected

== List of players ==
Statistics are correct as of 27 September 2026.

Sierra Leone T20I cricketers
General					Batting				Bowling				Fielding		Ref
No.	Name	First	Last	Mat	Runs	HS	Avg	50	Balls	Wkt	BBI	Ave	Ca	St	Ref
1	John Bangura†	2021	2026	54	639	52*	14.52	1	–	–	–	–	25	7	
2	Samuel Conteh	2021	2026	50	190	34	7.60	0	895	52	5/17	17.53	7	0	
3	Edmond Ernest	2021	2021	10	30	14	6.00	0	114	4	2/12	22.50	2	0	
4	Abass Gbla	2021	2026	48	381	55*	11.20	1	583	42	5/16	14.50	11	0	
5	Abu Kamara	2021	2026	33	514	57	19.76	1	306	17	3/6	22.64	6	0	
6	Arvind Kerai	2021	2021	9	76	24	9.50	0	6	0	–	–	5	0	
7	Miniru Kpaka	2021	2023	21	81	16*	5.40	0	216	11	4/11	19.81	8	0	
8	Lansana Lamin‡	2021	2026	64	739	52*	16.06	1	104	5	3/10	29.80	16	0	
9	George Sesay	2021	2026	53	250	28	10.41	0	949	67	4/6	14.34	15	0	
10	Sulaiman Tarawally	2021	2021	6	6	4*	6.00	0	114	1	1/19	118.00	0	0	
11	Solomon Williams	2021	2026	26	94	22*	18.80	0	390	16	3/11	30.25	2	0	
12	Osman Sankoh	2021	2021	1	0	0	0.00	0	6	0	–	–	0	0	
13	Ibrahim Mansaray†	2021	2021	4	8	5*	4.00	0	–	–	–	–	4	0	
14	Chernoh Bah	2021	2026	42	228	43*	9.12	0	448	19	4/2	25.57	10	0	
15	Zahid Khan	2021	2022	10	47	27	5.87	0	72	1	1/10	98.00	1	0	
16	Raymond Coker	2022	2026	55	396	53*	9.90	1	1001	39	4/4	24.69	12	0	
17	Mohammad Shamshad Khan	2022	2022	6	22	16*	11.00	0	48	3	2/4	19.00	0	0	
18	George Ngegba‡	2022	2024	28	396	72*	18.00	1	508	28	5/12	16.17	5	0	
19	Ibrahim Kamara	2022	2023	11	39	16	6.50	0	91	5	3/4	15.80	1	0	
20	Alusine Turay	2022	2026	40	609	78*	16.02	1	148	15	4/29	11.06	13	0	
21	Moses Williams	2023	2023	3	1	1*	–	0	18	0	–	–	0	0	
22	Yegbeh Jalloh†	2023	2026	29	327	72	12.57	2	–	–	–	–	6	0	
23	Aruna Kainessie	2023	2024	13	172	40	14.33	0	–	–	–	–	2	0	
24	Ibrahim Sesay	2023	2023	6	34	11*	8.50	0	3	0	–	–	0	0	
25	John Lassayo	2023	2026	14	14	5	2.80	0	156	7	2/9	25.71	3	0	
26	Ishmael Komba	2024	2024	1	–	–	–	–	–	–	–	–	0	0	
27	Ibrahim Karim	2025	2025	3	3	2	1.50	0	–	–	–	–	0	0	
28	Ibrahim Kpaka	2025	2026	12	48	18	4.80	0	–	–	–	–	7	0	
29	Mohamed Turay	2025	2026	25	23	9*	4.60	0	387	15	2/6	28.40	3	0	
30	Brima Ansumana†	2025	2026	10	45	12	7.50	0	–	–	–	–	2	0	
31	James Bangura	2025	2025	1	4	4	4.00	0	6	0	–	–	0	0	
32	Eric Turay	2026	2026	15	91	35*	9.10	0	–	–	–	–	14	0	
33	Aliya Kamara	2026	2026	9	61	19	8.71	0	42	3	2/23	27.33	1	0	
34	David Halloway	2026	2026	3	1	1	1.00	0	–	–	–	–	2	0	
