= University of Lagos Cricket Oval =

Cricket ground in Akoka, Nigeria

- Unilag Cricket Oval
- Interactive map of University of Lagos Cricket Oval

Ground information
- Location: Akoka, Nigeria
- Country: Nigeria
- Establishment: 2021
- Capacity: 2000

International information
- First T20I: 19 October 2021: Nigeria v Sierra Leone
- Last T20I: 26 October 2021: Nigeria v Sierra Leone
- As of 19 October 2021; Source: Cricinfo

The University of Lagos Cricket Oval is a cricket ground, in Akoka, Nigeria.

In the year 2020, the Vice Chancellor of the University Prof. Oluwatoyin Ogundipe held a sod cutting ceremony to rebuild the Cricket Pitch and promised to build it to international standards. The pitch was redeveloped by the school's alumni in honor of their coach Prof. Adebols Kukoyi who clocked 80years old then.

In October 2021, the ground was the venue for the bilateral series between the hosts Nigeria and Sierra Leone which were the first T20Is played in Nigeria and the first-ever T20Is for Sierra Leone cricket team. The series provided both sides with preparation for the T20 World Cup Africa Qualifier in November 2021. The series also saw resumption of the long-running cricketing rivalry between the two north-west African nations.

== Records ==
In October 2021, in the fifth match against Sierra Leone, Peter Aho took six wickets for five runs to record the best ever bowling figures in a T20I match, alongside taking a hat-trick, becoming the first Nigerian bowler to take a hat-trick.
