= Ivory Coast national cricket team =

Ivory Coast
- Flag of Ivory Coast
- Association: Fédération Ivoirienne De Cricket

Personnel
- Captain: Dosso Issiaka
- Coach: Kone Sekou

International Cricket Council
- ICC status: Associate member (2022)
- ICC region: Africa
ICC Rankings	Current	Best-ever
T20I	94th	94th (29-May-2026)

T20 Internationals
- First T20I: v Sierra Leone at Nigeria Cricket Federation Oval 1, Abuja; 23 November 2024
- Last T20I: v Kenya at Botswana Cricket Association Oval 2, Gaborone; 30 May 2026
T20Is	Played	Won/Lost
Total	11	0/11 (0 ties, 0 no results)
This year	6	0/6 (0 ties, 0 no results)
Home kit
Away kit
- As of 30 May 2026

The Ivory Coast national cricket team represents the country of Ivory Coast in international cricket. It is administered by the Ivory Coast Cricket Federation. Ivory Coast has been a member of Africa Cricket Association since 2022. They were granted associate status by the International Cricket Council (ICC) in July 2022.

In April 2018, the ICC decided to grant full Twenty20 International (T20I) status to all its members. Therefore, all Twenty20 matches played between the Ivory Coast and other ICC members after 1 January 2019 will be a full T20I.

== History ==
=== Associate membership (2022–present) ===
Ivory Coast was made an associate member of the ICC in July 2022, making its T20I debut 2 years later against Sierra Leone in the 2026 T20 World Cup Africa Qualifiers.

23 November 2024
14:15
Scorecard

Sierra Leone; 189/2 (20 overs)	v	Ivory Coast; 21 (10.4 overs)
George Ngegba 72* (44); Kone Aziz 1/29 (4 overs)		Mimi Alex 5 (3); George Ngegba 5/12 (3.4 overs)

Sierra Leone won by 168 runs
Nigeria Cricket Federation Oval 1, Abuja
Umpires: Arno Jacobs (SA) and Andrew Louw (Nam)
Player of the match: George Ngegba (Sle)

- Sierra Leone won the toss and elected to bat.
- First ever T20I match for Ivory Coast.

In their second qualifier match, Ivory Coast was bowled out for a mere seven runs against Nigeria, setting a new world record for the lowest total in a men's T20 International.

24 November 2024
14:15
Scorecard

Nigeria; 271/4 (20 overs)	v	Ivory Coast; 7 (7.3 overs)
Selim Salau 112 (53); Pamba Dimitri 1/45 (4 overs)		Ouattara Mohamed 4 (6); Prosper Useni 3/0 (1.3 overs)

Nigeria won by 264 runs
Nigeria Cricket Federation Oval 1, Abuja
Umpires: Stephen Harris (SA) and David Odhiambo (Ken)
Player of the match: Selim Salau (Nga)

- Nigeria won the toss and elected to bat.
- Selim Salau became the first player for Nigeria to score a century in men's T20Is.
- Ivory Coast's total (7) was the lowest team total in men's T20Is.

== Squad ==
The following squad was announced for the 2026 T20 World Cup Africa Qualifiers.

- Dosso Issiaka (c)
- Mimi Alex
- Kone Aziz
- Dje Claude
- Pamba Dimitri
- Ouattara Djakaridja
- Ladji Ezechiel
- Konan Felix
- Maiga Ibrahim (wk)
- Ouattara Issouf
- Ouattara Mohamed
- Kone Nagnama
- Assouan Roger
- Kouakou Wilfried

== Tournament history ==
=== T20 World Cup Africa Sub-regional Qualifier ===
T20 World Cup Africa Sub-regional Qualifier record
Year	Round	Position	GP	W	L	T	NR
(Kenya) 2024	Round-robin	6/6	5	0	5	0	0
(Botswana) 2026	Round-robin	7/7	6	0	6	0	0
Total	2/2	0 Title	11	0	11	0	0

== Records ==
International Match Summary — Ivory Coast

Last updated 30 May 2026

Playing Record
Format	M	W	L	T	NR	Inaugural Match
Twenty20 Internationals	11	0	11	0	0	23 November 2024

=== Twenty20 International ===
T20I record versus other nations

Records complete to T20I #3920. Last updated 30 May 2026.

Opponent	M	W	L	T	NR	First match	First win
vs Associate Members
Botswana	2	0	2	0	0	26 November 2024	
Cameroon	1	0	1	0	0	26 May 2026	
Eswatini	1	0	1	0	0	27 November 2024	
Kenya	1	0	1	0	0	30 May 2026	
Mali	1	0	1	0	0	25 May 2026	
Nigeria	1	0	1	0	0	24 November 2024	
Rwanda	1	0	1	0	0	24 May 2026	
Saint Helena	1	0	1	0	0	28 November 2024	
Sierra Leone	2	0	2	0	0	23 November 2024	

== See also ==
- List of Ivory Coast Twenty20 International cricketers
