= Wallace Mubayiwa =

Zimbabwean cricketer (born 1998)

Personal information
- Full name: Wallace Tapiwanashe Mubayiwa
- Born: 24 August 1998 (age 28)
- Batting: Left-handed
- Bowling: Slow left arm orthodox
Medal record
Representing Zimbabwe
Men's Cricket
African Games
Gold medal – first place	2023 Accra	Team
- Source: Cricinfo, 7 December 2024

Wallace Tapiwanashe Mubayiwa (born 24 August 1998) is a Zimbabwean cricketer.

== Career ==
He made his List A debut for Mid West Rhinos against Matabeleland Tuskers on 28 October 2022 during the 2022–23 Pro50 Championship. He made his T20 debut for Lions against Mountaineers on 20 February 2023 during the 2022–23 Zimbabwe Domestic Twenty20 Competition. He made his first-class debut for Mid West Rhinos against Mashonaland Eagles on 13 December 2023 during the 2023–24 Logan Cup.

In March 2024, he was included in Zimbabwe's contingent for the 2023 African Games and he represented Zimbabwe Emerging Team in the men's cricket tournament at the 2023 African Games. Zimbabwe eventually claimed gold medal in the African Games cricket tournament defeating Namibia by 8 wickets in the final.
