= Sumeet Verma =

Ugandan cricketer (born 1990)

Personal information
- Born: 18 November 1990 (age 35); Bhumti, Himachal Pradesh, India
- Batting: Right-handed
- Bowling: Right arm off break

International information
- National side: Uganda
- T20I debut (cap 42): 26 September 2025 v Zimbabwe
- Last T20I: 28 September 2025 v Tanzania
- Source: Cricinfo, 5 March 2016

Sumeet Verma (born 18 November 1990) is an Indian-born Ugandan cricketer. He has played first-class and List A cricket for Himachal Pradesh.

In August 2025, he was named in Uganda's squad for the 2025 Men's T20 World Cup Africa Regional Final.
