= Ashmit Shreshta =

Nepalese cricketer

Ashmit Shrestha
Personal information
- Full name: Ashmit Shrestha
- Born: 3 March 1996 (age 30); Nepal
- Batting: Right-handed
- Role: Wicket-keeper

International information
- National side: Nigeria
- T20I debut (cap 9): 19 October 2021 v Sierra Leone
- Last T20I: 9 December 2022 v Cameroon
- Source: Cricinfo, 15 December 2022

Ashmit Shrestha (born 3 March 1996) is a Nepalese cricketer who plays for the Nigeria national cricket team. He is a right-handed batsman and wicket-keeper.

Shrestha grew up in Bhairahawa, Nepal. He moved to Nigeria in 2015 to work for a steel company, where he joined the Rising Stars Cricket Club in Lagos.

Shrestha made his Twenty20 International debut against Sierra Leone in October 2021. He played for Nigeria in the 2021 ICC Men's T20 World Cup Africa Qualifier Regional Final.
