= Aarnav Patel =

Kenyan cricketer

Personal information
- Born: 5 January 2006 (age 20); Nairobi, Kenya
- Batting: Right-handed
- Bowling: Right-arm leg break
- Role: Bowler

International information
- National side: Kenya
- T20I debut (cap 48): 20 March 2024 v Ghana
- Last T20I: 21 March 2024 v Zimbabwe
- Source: Cricinfo, 8 October 2021

Aarnav Patel (born 5 January 2006) is a Kenyan cricketer. He is a right handed batsman and a right arm leg spin bowler. He made his Twenty20 International debut on 18 March 2024, for Kenya in the 2023 Africa Games.

== Career ==
Patel played for Stray Lions Cricket Club in the Nairobi Provincial Cricket Association (NPCA) Super Division in 2024.

== International career ==
Playing for the Kenya national under-19 cricket team in July 2023, Patel took 6-15 against Uganda U19 in a qualifying match for the 2024 U19 Cricket World Cup.

He was called up to the senior Kenya team for the 2023 Africa Games. On his senior Twenty20 debut on 18 March 2024, Patel earned man of the match honours, taking five wickets against University Sport South Africa and finishing with bowling figures of 5-15. He made his T20I debut on 20 March 2024, against Ghana.
