= George Ngegba =

Sierra Leonean cricketer

Personal information
- Full name: George Edward Ngegba
- Born: 12 November 2002 (age 24)
- Batting: Right-handed
- Bowling: Right-arm offbreak
- Role: Batsman

International information
- National side: Sierra Leone (2022–present)
- T20I debut: 1 December 2022 v Tanzania
- Last T20I: 17 December 2023 v Ghana

Career statistics
Competition	T20I
Matches	28
Runs scored	396
Batting average	18.00
100s/50s	0/1
Top score	72*
Balls bowled	508
Wickets	28
Bowling average	16.17
5 wickets in innings	1
10 wickets in match	0
Best bowling	5/12
Catches/stumpings	5/–
- Source: Cricinfo, 16 February 2025

George Edward Ngegba (born 12 November 2002) is a Sierra Leonean cricketer and plays for the Sierra Leone national cricket team in international cricket. He also serves as the incumbent national captain of the Sierra Leone cricket team. In 2020, he won the national award for being the best sports personality during the 2020 Sierra Leone National Entertainment Awards.

== Career ==
He was adjudged as the Best Sportsman of The Year at the Sierra Leone National Entertainment Awards for the year 2020. He was nominated as one of the six sports personalities alongside Mustapha Bundu, Augustus Kargbo, Mohamed Buya Turay, Ishmael Bangura and Ibrahim Jon Kamara in the category to determine the Sierra Leone's Best Sportsman of the Year 2020. He also captained the Sierra Leone men's national under-19 national side during the 2020 Under-19 Cricket World Cup qualification pathway.

He was appointed as the captain of the Sierra Leone team ahead of the 2022–23 ICC Men's T20 World Cup Africa Qualifier, which was reserved as a curtain raiser in the qualification pathway for African nations in the lead up to the 2024 ICC Men's T20 World Cup. He eventually made his international debut as well as his T20I debut against Tanzania on 1 December 2022 at the 2022–23 ICC Men's T20 World Cup Sub Regional Africa Qualifier Group B tournament. He eventually coincidentally made his captaincy debut in his very first international appearance in Sierra Leone colours and also top scored for his side with a knock of 29 off 27 deliveries after coming into bat at number three position. Sierra Leone was eventually bundled out cheaply for 57 runs while batting first during the match against Tanzania and Tanzania secured a comfortable victory via Duckworth–Lewis–Stern method.

He captained Sierra Leone at the 2023 West Africa Trophy, where Sierra Leone only managed one solitary win throughout the course of the tournament. He also captained Sierra Leone outfit at the 2023 ACA Africa T20 Cup.

== See also ==
- List of Sierra Leone Twenty20 International cricketers
