= Tashinga Musekiwa =

Zimbabwean cricketer (born 2000)

Personal information
- Born: 10 February 2000 (age 26); Kadoma, Zimbabwe
- Batting: Right-handed
- Bowling: Right arm medium
- Role: Batsman

International information
- National side: Zimbabwe
- T20I debut (cap 79): 19 October 2024 v Seychelles
- Last T20I: 9 February 2026 v Oman

Domestic team information
- Years: Team
- 2021–present: Mid West Rhinos
- Source: Cricinfo, 6 December 2024

Tashinga Musekiwa (born 10 February 2000) is a Zimbabwean cricketer who plays for Zimbabwe cricket team and Mid West Rhinos in domestic cricket.

== Career ==
He made his first-class debut for Mid West Rhinos against Mountaineers on 14 January 2023 during the 2022–23 Logan Cup. He was included in Mid West Rhinos squad for the 2023–24 Zimbabwe Domestic Twenty20 Competition which was played in March 2024. He was retained by Rhinos ahead of the 2023–24 Logan Cup and 2024–25 Logan Cup. He made his List A debut for Mid West Rhinos against Matabeleland Tuskers on 26 April 2021 during the 2020–21 Pro50 Championship. He made his T20 debut for Rhinos against Southern Rocks on 11 April 2021 during the 2020–21 Zimbabwe Domestic Twenty20 Competition.

In March 2024, he was named in Zimbabwe's Emerging squad for the 2023 African Games.

In October 2024, he was named in Zimbabwe's squad for the 2024 Men's T20 World Cup Africa Sub-regional Qualifier B which was held in Kenya. He made his Twenty20 International (T20I) debut for Zimbabwe against Seychelles during the that tournament. In November 2024, he was named in Zimbabwe's squad to face off Pakistan in a three match bilateral home ODI series.
