= Peter Aho =

Nigerian cricketer

Personal information
- Full name: Peter Aho
- Born: 2 March 2003 (age 23)
- Batting: Right-handed
- Bowling: Right-arm medium-fast

International information
- National side: Nigeria
- T20I debut (cap 19): 11 September 2021 v Kenya
- Last T20I: 12 July 2024 v Kenya

Career statistics
Competition	T20I	T20
Matches	17	17
Runs scored	169	169
Batting average	15.36	15.36
100s/50s	–/–	–/–
Top score	44*	44*
Balls bowled	341	341
Wickets	22	22
Bowling average	15.77	15.77
5 wickets in innings	1	1
10 wickets in match	–	–
Best bowling	6/5	6/5
Catches/stumpings	2/–	2/–
- Source: Cricinfo, 17 October 2023

Peter Aho (born 2 March 2003) is a Nigerian cricketer. In March 2019, he was named in the Nigeria national under-19 cricket team that qualified for the 2020 Under-19 Cricket World Cup. It was the first time that Nigeria had qualified for a Cricket World Cup tournament.

In September 2021, Aho featured in Nigeria's Twenty20 International (T20I) squad for the 2021–22 Uganda Tri-Nation Series tournament. He made his T20I debut on 11 September 2021 against Kenya. The following month, he was also named in Nigeria's T20I squad for their home series against Sierra Leone. In the fifth match of the series, Aho took six wickets for five runs to record the best ever bowling figures in a T20I match. He also became the first bowler for Nigeria to take a five-wicket haul and a hat-trick in a T20I match.

In October 2021, he was named in Nigeria's squad for the Regional Final of the 2021 ICC Men's T20 World Cup Africa Qualifier tournament in Rwanda.
