= Sylvester Okpe =

Nigerian cricketer

Personal information
- Full name: Sylvester Ameh Okpe
- Born: 7 December 2000 (age 25)
- Batting: Right-handed
- Bowling: Right-arm off break

International information
- National side: Nigeria
- T20I debut (cap 7): 20 May 2019 v Kenya
- Last T20I: 12 July 2024 v Kenya

Career statistics
Competition	T20I	T20
Matches	17	20
Runs scored	75	82
Batting average	6.81	6.83
100s/50s	–/–	–/–
Top score	22	22
Balls bowled	242	272
Wickets	20	20
Bowling average	10.75	13.40
5 wickets in innings	–	–
10 wickets in match	–	–
Best bowling	3/12	3/12
Catches/stumpings	3/–	4/–
- Source: Cricinfo, 17 October 2023

Sylvester Okpe (born 7 December 2000) is a Nigerian cricketer. A right-handed batsman and an off break bowler, he is a former captain of the Nigeria U19 cricket team, and the current captain of the Nigeria national cricket team.

== Career ==
In April 2018, he was part of Nigeria's squad in the North-Western group of the 2018–19 ICC World Twenty20 Africa Qualifier tournament. In September 2018, he was named in Nigeria's squad for the 2018 Africa T20 Cup. He made his Twenty20 debut in the 2018 Africa T20 Cup on 14 September 2018.

In March 2019, he was named as the captain of Nigeria's squad for the Africa Division 1 qualifier tournament for the 2020 Under-19 Cricket World Cup. Nigeria went on to win the competition to qualify for the 2020 Under-19 Cricket World Cup, with Okpe named as the Player of the Tournament. In May 2019, he was named in Nigeria's squad for the Regional Finals of the 2018–19 ICC T20 World Cup Africa Qualifier tournament in Uganda. He made his Twenty20 International (T20I) debut for Nigeria against Kenya on 20 May 2019.

In October 2019, Okpe was named as the vice-captain of Nigeria's squad for the 2019 ICC T20 World Cup Qualifier tournament in the United Arab Emirates. Ahead of the tournament, the International Cricket Council (ICC) named him as the player to watch in Nigeria's squad. He was the leading wicket-taker for Nigeria in the tournament, with five dismissals in five matches.

In December 2019, he was named as the captain of Nigeria's squad for the 2020 Under-19 Cricket World Cup.

In October 2021, he was named as the captain of Nigeria's squad for the Regional Final of the 2021 ICC Men's T20 World Cup Africa Qualifier tournament in Rwanda.
