= List of Nigeria Twenty20 International cricketers =

This is a list of Nigerian Twenty20 International cricketers. In April 2018, the ICC decided to grant full Twenty20 International (T20I) status to all its members. Therefore, all Twenty20 matches played between Nigeria and other ICC members after 1 January 2019 have the T20I status.

This list comprises all members of the Nigeria cricket team who have played at least one T20I match. It is initially arranged in the order in which each player won his first Twenty20 cap. Where more than one player won his first Twenty20 cap in the same match, those players are listed alphabetically by surname. Nigeria played their first T20I match on 20 May 2019 against Kenya at the ICC T20 World Cup Africa Qualifier Finals.

== Key ==
General

- ‡ – Captain
- † – Wicket-keeper
- First – Year of debut
- Last – Year of latest game
- Mat – Number of matches played

Batting

- Runs – Runs scored in career
- HS – Highest score
- Avg – Runs scored per dismissal
- 50 – Number of half centuries
- 100 – Number of Centuries
- * – Batsman remained not out

Bowling

- Balls – Balls bowled in career
- Wkt – Wickets taken in career
- BBI – Best bowling in an innings
- Ave – Average runs per wicket

Fielding

- Ca – Catches taken
- St – Stumpings affected

== List of players ==
Statistics are correct as of 25 October 2026.

Nigeria T20I cricketers
General					Batting					Bowling				Fielding		Ref
No.	Name	First	Last	Mat	Runs	HS	Avg	50	100	Balls	Wkt	BBI	Ave	Ca	St	Ref
1	Abiodun Abioye	2019	2019	5	0	0*	–	0	0	60	3	2/26	29.00	2	0	
2	Rasheed Abolarin	2019	2021	10	33	20*	16.50	0	0	166	9	3/8	16.00	2	0	
3	Vincent Adewoye	2019	2026	59	507	49	12.67	0	0	377	25	5/11	19.88	17	0	
4	Joshua Ayannaike‡†	2019	2021	20	129	33	6.78	0	0	–	–	–	–	8	1	
5	Isaac Danladi	2019	2026	70	1,621	90*	28.94	8	0	544	34	4/22	15.52	32	0	
6	Isaac Okpe	2019	2026	94	900	65*	14.51	3	0	1,544	93	5/25	18.36	23	0	
7	Sylvester Okpe‡	2019	2026	90	838	45*	15.51	0	0	1,421	78	5/9	18.07	29	0	
8	Ademola Onikoyi‡	2019	2023	29	383	52*	15.95	1	0	–	–	–	–	8	0	
9	Chimezie Onwuzulike	2019	2022	22	235	54	13.82	1	0	–	–	–	–	8	0	
10	Ovais Yousof	2019	2019	3	52	33	17.33	0	0	–	–	–	–	0	0	
11	Leke Oyede	2019	2019	8	73	39	10.42	0	0	48	1	1/14	44.00	2	0	
12	Chima Akachukwu	2019	2026	26	95	30	8.63	0	0	383	20	3/6	22.60	8	0	
13	Mohameed Taiwo	2019	2026	53	148	26	8.22	0	0	808	39	4/13	22.25	18	0	
14	Sesan Adedeji	2019	2025	47	772	68	20.86	3	0	210	8	2/14	28.37	17	0	
15	Daniel Ajekun	2019	2025	35	375	36	12.09	0	0	73	4	1/5	21.50	3	0	
16	Daniel Gim	2019	2021	17	82	18	7.45	0	0	36	2	1/18	32.50	4	0	
17	Sulaimon Runsewe†	2019	2026	81	1,455	80	20.78	8	0	33	3	1/4	16.66	56	3	
18	Gershon Yusuf	2019	2019	1	0	0	0.00	0	0	–	–	–	–	1	0	
19	Peter Aho	2021	2026	70	287	44*	13.04	0	0	1,261	74	6/5	17.25	17	0	
20	Odion Isesele	2021	2026	6	0	0*	–	0	0	72	2	1/8	56.00	3	0	
21	Mustapha Yusuf	2021	2021	5	33	16	16.50	0	0	84	3	1/15	40.00	0	0	
22	Prosper Useni	2021	2025	61	445	37	14.35	0	0	880	52	4/14	17.96	14	0	
23	Olayinka Olaleye	2021	2026	28	358	46*	15.56	0	0	–	–	–	–	7	0	
24	Samuel Mba	2021	2021	8	105	40*	21.00	0	0	–	–	–	–	4	0	
25	Ashmit Shreshta†	2021	2023	22	385	76	20.26	1	0	–	–	–	–	18	2	
26	Segun Ogundipe	2021	2021	4	1	1*	–	0	0	60	2	1/9	22.50	0	0	
27	Ridwan Abdulkareem	2021	2026	60	305	39	13.86	0	0	836	65	6/22	13.29	21	0	
28	Segun Olayinka	2021	2021	3	25	24	8.33	0	0	–	–	–	–	1	0	
29	Akhere Isesele	2022	2025	19	124	44	9.53	0	0	41	4	1/5	15.75	5	0	
30	Chiemelie Udekwe	2022	2025	26	33	11*	8.25	0	0	451	27	3/12	16.03	7	0	
31	Joshua Asia	2022	2025	25	5	2*	1.25	0	0	414	30	4/11	10.60	8	0	
32	Selim Salau	2024	2026	45	1114	112	26.52	2	2	–	–	–	–	11	0	
33	Ifeanyichukwu Uboh	2024	2024	10	1	1*	–	0	0	78	3	1/21	37.33	2	0	
34	Miracle Akhigbe	2024	2026	12	110	26*	15.71	0	0	101	5	2/14	19.60	3	0	
35	David Ankrah (Note: David Ankrah also played four Twenty20 International matches for Ghana. Only his record for Nigeria is given above.)	2025	2026	6	30	24	7.50	0	0	12	0	–	–	1	0	
36	Solomon Chilemanya†	2025	2026	8	49	17	6.12	0	0	–	–	–	–	5	0	
37	Abdulrahman Jimoh	2025	2025	6	17	7*	5.66	0	0	73	4	1/10	17.75	3	0	
38	Okasha Isiyaku	2025	2025	6	8	5*	–	0	0	154	10	3/17	16.50	3	0	
39	Elochukwu Ndubudem	2025	2026	9	7	4	3.50	0	0	179	11	3/12	13.54	1	0	
40	Kenneth Boniface	2025	2026	15	39	9*	6.50	0	0	118	5	2/14	30.20	8	0	
41	Ali Rahmon†	2025	2026	16	333	64*	27.75	2	0	–	–	–	–	4	2	
42	Abdullahi Ismail	2025	2026	12	11	5	3.66	0	0	240	17	4/8	11.41	3	0	
43	Warees Azeez	2026	2026	1	–	–	–	–	–	15	0	–	–	0	0	
