= ICC Awards =

International cricket annual awards

- Current: 2024 ICC Awards
- Awarded for: Excellence in International cricket team and individual achievements
- Presented by: ICC
- First award: 7 September 2004

Highlights
- Most awards: Men's: (India) Virat Kohli (10 awards); Women's: (Australia) Ellyse Perry (6 awards)
- Website: ICC Awards

The ICC Awards is an International cricket award presented annually by the sport's governing body, ICC.

The first awarding ceremony was held on 7 September 2004 in London, England. Between 2009 and 2014 the awards were known as the LG ICC Awards for sponsorship reasons.

Virat Kohli holds the record for most awards by an individual with 10 awards, and most appearances in teams with 14 times along with AB de Villiers. In Women's section, Ellyse Perry holds the record for most awards by an individual with 6 awards and Smriti Mandhana holds the record for most appearances in teams with 9 times.

== Men's awards ==
=== Cricketer Of The Decade ===
Year	Winner
2011–2020	(India) Virat Kohli

=== Cricketer Of The Year ===
Year	Winner
2004	(India) Rahul Dravid
2005	(South Africa) Jacques Kallis (England) Andrew Flintoff (Shared)
2006	(Australia) Ricky Ponting
2007	(Australia) Ricky Ponting
2008	(Cricket West Indies) Shivnarine Chanderpaul
2009	(Australia) Mitchell Johnson
2010	(India) Sachin Tendulkar
2011	(England) Jonathan Trott
2012	(Sri Lanka) Kumar Sangakkara
2013	(Australia) Michael Clarke
2014	(Australia) Mitchell Johnson
2015	(Australia) Steve Smith
2016	(India) Ravichandran Ashwin
2017	(India) Virat Kohli
2018	(India) Virat Kohli
2019	(England) Ben Stokes
2021	(Pakistan) Shaheen Shah Afridi
2022	(Pakistan) Babar Azam
2023	(Australia) Pat Cummins
2024	(India) Jasprit Bumrah

=== Test Cricketer Of The Decade ===
Year	Winner
2011–2020	(Australia) Steve Smith

=== Test Cricketer Of The Year ===
Year	Winner
2004	(India) Rahul Dravid
2005	(South Africa) Jacques Kallis
2006	(Australia) Ricky Ponting
2007	(Pakistan) Mohammad Yousuf
2008	(South Africa) Dale Steyn
2009	(India) Gautam Gambhir
2010	(India) Virender Sehwag
2011	(England) Alastair Cook
2012	(Sri Lanka) Kumar Sangakkara
2013	(Australia) Michael Clarke
2014	(Australia) Mitchell Johnson
2015	(Australia) Steve Smith
2016	(India) Ravichandran Ashwin
2017	(Australia) Steve Smith
2018	(India) Virat Kohli
2019	(Australia) Pat Cummins
2021	(England) Joe Root
2022	(England) Ben Stokes
2023	(Australia) Usman Khawaja
2024	(India) Jasprit Bumrah

=== ODI Cricketer Of The Decade ===
Year	Winner
2011–2020	(India) Virat Kohli

=== ODI Cricketer Of The Year ===
Year	Winner
2004	(England) Andrew Flintoff
2005	(England) Kevin Pietersen
2006	(Australia) Michael Hussey
2007	(Australia) Mathew Hayden
2008	(India) MS Dhoni
2009	(India) MS Dhoni
2010	(South Africa) AB de Villiers
2011	(Sri Lanka) Kumar Sangakkara
2012	(India) Virat Kohli
2013	(Sri Lanka) Kumar Sangakkara
2014	(South Africa) AB de Villiers
2015	(South Africa) AB de Villiers
2016	(South Africa) Quinton de Kock
2017	(India) Virat Kohli
2018	(India) Virat Kohli
2019	(India) Rohit Sharma
2021	(Pakistan) Babar Azam
2022	(Pakistan) Babar Azam
2023	(India) Virat Kohli
2024	(Afghanistan) Azmatullah Omarzai

=== T20I Cricketer Of The Decade ===
Year	Winner
2011–2020	(Afghanistan) Rashid Khan

=== T20I Cricketer Of The Year ===
Year	Winner
2021	(Pakistan) Mohammad Rizwan
2022	(India) Suryakumar Yadav
2023	(India) Suryakumar Yadav
2024	(India) Arshdeep Singh

=== Emerging Cricketer Of The Year ===
Year	Winner
2004	(India) Irfan Pathan
2005	(England) Kevin Pietersen
2006	(England) Ian Bell
2007	(Australia) Shaun Tait
2008	(Sri Lanka) Ajantha Mendis
2009	(Australia) Peter Siddle
2010	(England) Steven Finn
2011	(Cricket West Indies) Devendra Bishoo
2012	(Cricket West Indies) Sunil Narine
2013	(India) Cheteshwar Pujara
2014	(England) Gary Ballance
2015	(Australia) Josh Hazlewood
2016	(Bangladesh) Mustafizur Rahman
2017	(Pakistan) Hasan Ali
2018	(India) Rishabh Pant
2019	(Australia) Marnus Labuschagne
2021	(South Africa) Janneman Malan
2022	(South Africa) Marco Jansen
2023	(New Zealand) Rachin Ravindra
2024	(Sri Lanka) Kamindu Mendis

=== Associate Cricketer Of The Decade ===
Year	Winner
2011–2020	(Scotland) Kyle Coetzer

=== Associate Cricketer Of The Year ===
Year	Winner
2007	(Kenya) Thomas Odoyo
2008	(Netherlands) Ryan ten Doeschate
2009	(Ireland) William Porterfield
2010	(Netherlands) Ryan ten Doeschate
2011	(Netherlands) Ryan ten Doeschate
2012	(Ireland) George Dockrell
2013	(Ireland) Kevin O'Brien
2014	(Scotland) Preston Mommsen
2015	(United Arab Emirates) Khurram Khan
2016	(Afghanistan) Mohammad Shahzad
2017	(Afghanistan) Rashid Khan
2018	(Scotland) Calum MacLeod
2019	(Scotland) Kyle Coetzer
2021	(Oman) Zeeshan Maqsood
2022	(Namibia) Gerhard Erasmus
2023	(Netherlands) Bas De Leede
2024	(Namibia) Gerhard Erasmus

=== Test Team Of The Decade ===
Test Team of the Decade
Batting position	Player	Team	Role
Opener	Alastair Cook	England	Batsman
Opener	David Warner	Australia	Batsman
Number 3	Kane Williamson	New Zealand	Batsman
Number 4	Virat Kohli	India	Batsman / Captain
Number 5	Steve Smith	Australia	Batsman
Number 6	Kumar Sangakkara	Sri Lanka	Batsman / (wk)
Number 7	Ben Stokes	England	All-rounder
Number 8	Ravichandran Ashwin	India	All-rounder
Number 9	Dale Steyn	South Africa	Bowler
Number 10	Stuart Broad	England	Bowler
Number 11	James Anderson	England	Bowler

=== Test Team Of The Year ===
Year	No. 1	No. 2	No. 3	No. 4	No. 5	No. 6	No. 7	No. 8	No. 9	No. 10	No. 11	12th man
2004	(Australia) Matthew Hayden	(South Africa) Herschelle Gibbs	(Australia) Ricky Ponting (c)	(India) Rahul Dravid	(Cricket West Indies) Brian Lara	(South Africa) Jacques Kallis	(Australia) Adam Gilchrist (wk)	(Sri Lanka) Chaminda Vaas	(Australia) Shane Warne	(Australia) Jason Gillespie	(England) Steve Harmison	
2005	(India) Virender Sehwag	(South Africa) Graeme Smith	(Australia) Ricky Ponting (c)	(South Africa) Jacques Kallis	(Cricket West Indies) Brian Lara	(Pakistan) Inzamam-ul-Haq	(England) Andrew Flintoff	(Australia) Adam Gilchrist (wk)	(Australia) Shane Warne	(Sri Lanka) Chaminda Vaas	(Australia) Glenn McGrath	(India) Anil Kumble
2006	(Australia) Matthew Hayden	(Australia) Michael Hussey	(Australia) Ricky Ponting	(India) Rahul Dravid (c)	(Pakistan) Mohammad Yousuf	(Sri Lanka) Kumar Sangakkara (wk)	(England) Andrew Flintoff	(Australia) Shane Warne	(South Africa) Makhaya Ntini	(Sri Lanka) Muttiah Muralitharan	(Australia) Glenn McGrath	(Australia) Brett Lee
2007	(Australia) Matthew Hayden	(England) Michael Vaughan	(Australia) Ricky Ponting (c)	(Pakistan) Mohammad Yousuf	(England) Kevin Pietersen	(Australia) Michael Hussey	(Sri Lanka) Kumar Sangakkara (wk)	(Australia) Stuart Clark	(South Africa) Makhaya Ntini	(Pakistan) Mohammad Asif	(Sri Lanka) Muttiah Muralitharan	(India) Zaheer Khan
2008	(South Africa) Graeme Smith (c)	(India) Virender Sehwag	(Sri Lanka) Mahela Jayawardene	(Cricket West Indies) Shivnarine Chanderpaul	(England) Kevin Pietersen	(South Africa) Jacques Kallis	(Sri Lanka) Kumar Sangakkara (wk)	(Australia) Brett Lee	(England) Ryan Sidebottom	(South Africa) Dale Steyn	(Sri Lanka) Muttiah Muralitharan	(Australia) Stuart Clark
2009	(India) Gautam Gambhir	(England) Andrew Strauss	(South Africa) AB de Villiers	(India) Sachin Tendulkar	(Sri Lanka) Thilan Samaraweera	(Australia) Michael Clarke	(India) MS Dhoni (c/wk)	(Bangladesh) Shakib Al Hasan	(Australia) Mitchell Johnson	(England) Stuart Broad	(South Africa) Dale Steyn	(India) Harbhajan Singh
2010	(India) Virender Sehwag	(Australia) Simon Katich	(India) Sachin Tendulkar	(South Africa) Hashim Amla	(Sri Lanka) Kumar Sangakkara	(South Africa) Jacques Kallis	(India) MS Dhoni (c/wk)	(England) Graeme Swann	(England) James Anderson	(South Africa) Dale Steyn	(Australia) Doug Bollinger	
2011	(England) Alastair Cook	(South Africa) Hashim Amla	(England) Jonathan Trott	(India) Sachin Tendulkar	(Sri Lanka) Kumar Sangakkara (c/wk)	(South Africa) AB de Villiers	(South Africa) Jacques Kallis	(England) Stuart Broad	(England) Graeme Swann	(South Africa) Dale Steyn	(England) James Anderson	(India) Zaheer Khan
2012	(England) Alastair Cook	(South Africa) Hashim Amla	(Sri Lanka) Kumar Sangakkara	(South Africa) Jacques Kallis	(Australia) Michael Clarke (c)	(Cricket West Indies) Shivnarine Chanderpaul	(England) Matt Prior (wk)	(England) Stuart Broad	(Pakistan) Saeed Ajmal	(South Africa) Vernon Philander	(South Africa) Dale Steyn	(South Africa) AB de Villiers
2013	(England) Alastair Cook (c)	(India) Cheteshwar Pujara	(South Africa) Hashim Amla	(Australia) Michael Clarke	(Australia) Michael Hussey	(South Africa) AB de Villiers	(India) MS Dhoni (wk)	(England) Graeme Swann	(South Africa) Dale Steyn	(England) James Anderson	(South Africa) Vernon Philander	(India) R Ashwin
2014	(Australia) David Warner	(New Zealand) Kane Williamson	(Sri Lanka) Kumar Sangakkara	(South Africa) AB de Villiers (wk)	(England) Joe Root	(Sri Lanka) Angelo Mathews (c)	(Australia) Mitchell Johnson	(England) Stuart Broad	(South Africa) Dale Steyn	(Sri Lanka) Rangana Herath	(New Zealand) Tim Southee	(New Zealand) Ross Taylor
2015	(Australia) David Warner	(England) Alastair Cook (c)	(New Zealand) Kane Williamson	(Pakistan) Younis Khan	(Australia) Steve Smith	(England) Joe Root	(Pakistan) Sarfaraz Ahmed (wk)	(England) Stuart Broad	(New Zealand) Trent Boult	(Pakistan) Yasir Shah	(Australia) Josh Hazlewood	(India) R Ashwin
2016	(Australia) David Warner	(England) Alastair Cook (c)	(New Zealand) Kane Williamson	(England) Joe Root	(Australia) Adam Voges	(England) Jonny Bairstow (wk)	(England) Ben Stokes	(India) R Ashwin	(Sri Lanka) Rangana Herath	(Australia) Mitchell Starc	(South Africa) Dale Steyn	(Australia) Steve Smith
2017	(South Africa) Dean Elgar	(Australia) David Warner	(India) Virat Kohli (c)	(Australia) Steve Smith	(India) Cheteshwar Pujara	(England) Ben Stokes	(South Africa) Quinton de Kock (wk)	(India) R Ashwin	(Australia) Mitchell Starc	(South Africa) Kagiso Rabada	(England) James Anderson	
2018	(New Zealand) Tom Latham	(Sri Lanka) Dimuth Karunaratne	(New Zealand) Kane Williamson	(India) Virat Kohli (c)	(New Zealand) Henry Nicholls	(India) Rishabh Pant (wk)	(Cricket West Indies) Jason Holder	(South Africa) Kagiso Rabada	(Australia) Nathan Lyon	(India) Jasprit Bumrah	(Pakistan) Mohammad Abbas	
2019	(India) Mayank Agarwal	(New Zealand) Tom Latham	(Australia) Marnus Labuschagne	(India) Virat Kohli (c)	(Australia) Steve Smith	(England) Ben Stokes	(New Zealand) BJ Watling (wk)	(Australia) Pat Cummins	(Australia) Mitchell Starc	(New Zealand) Neil Wagner	(Australia) Nathan Lyon	
2021	(Sri Lanka) Dimuth Karunaratne	(India) Rohit Sharma	(Australia) Marnus Labuschagne	(England) Joe Root	(New Zealand) Kane Williamson(c)	(Pakistan) Fawad Alam	(India) Rishabh Pant (wk)	(India) Ravichandran Ashwin	(New Zealand) Kyle Jamieson	(Pakistan) Hasan Ali	(Pakistan) Shaheen Shah Afridi	
2022	(Australia) Usman Khawaja	(Cricket West Indies) Kraigg Brathwaite	(Australia) Marnus Labuschagne	(Pakistan) Babar Azam	(England) Jonny Bairstow	(England) Ben Stokes (c)	(India) Rishabh Pant (wk)	(Australia) Pat Cummins	(South Africa) Kagiso Rabada	(Australia) Nathan Lyon	(England) James Anderson	
2023	(Australia) Usman Khawaja	(Sri Lanka) Dimuth Karunaratne	(New Zealand) Kane Williamson	(England) Joe Root	(Australia) Travis Head	(India) Ravindra Jadeja	(Australia) Alex Carey (wk)	(Australia) Pat Cummins (c)	(India) Ravichandran Ashwin	(Australia) Mitchell Starc	(England) Stuart Broad	
2024	(India) Yashasvi Jaiswal	(England) Ben Duckett	(New Zealand) Kane Williamson	(England) Joe Root	(England) Harry Brook	(Sri Lanka) Kamindu Mendis	(England) Jamie Smith (wk)	(India) Ravindra Jadeja	(Australia) Pat Cummins (c)	(New Zealand) Matt Henry	(India) Jasprit Bumrah	

=== ODI Team Of The Decade ===
ODI Team of the Decade
Batting position	Player	Team	Role
Opener	Rohit Sharma	India	Batsman
Opener	David Warner	Australia	Batsman
Number 3	Virat Kohli	India	Batsman
Number 4	AB de Villiers	South Africa	Batsman
Number 5	Shakib Al Hasan	Bangladesh	All-rounder
Number 6	MS Dhoni	India	Batsman / Captain, (wk)
Number 7	Ben Stokes	England	All-rounder
Number 8	Jasprit Bumrah	India	Bowler
Number 9	Trent Boult	New Zealand	Bowler
Number 10	Imran Tahir	South Africa	Bowler
Number 11	Lasith Malinga	Sri Lanka	Bowler

=== ODI Team Of The Year ===
Year	No. 1	No. 2	No. 3	No. 4	No. 5	No. 6	No. 7	No. 8	No. 9	No. 10	No. 11	12th man
2004	(Australia) Adam Gilchrist (wk)	(India) Sachin Tendulkar	(Cricket West Indies) Chris Gayle	(Australia) Ricky Ponting (c)	(Cricket West Indies) Brian Lara	(India) Virender Sehwag	(South Africa) Jacques Kallis	(England) Andrew Flintoff	(South Africa) Shaun Pollock	(Sri Lanka) Chaminda Vaas	(Australia) Jason Gillespie	
2005	(Sri Lanka) Marvan Atapattu (c)	(Australia) Adam Gilchrist (wk)	(India) Rahul Dravid	(England) Kevin Pietersen	(Pakistan) Inzamam-ul-Haq	(England) Andrew Flintoff	(Australia) Andrew Symonds	(New Zealand) Daniel Vettori	(Australia) Brett Lee	(Pakistan) Naved-ul-Hasan	(Australia) Glenn McGrath	(South Africa) Jacques Kallis
2006	(Australia) Adam Gilchrist (wk)	(India) MS Dhoni	(Australia) Ricky Ponting	(Sri Lanka) Mahela Jayawardene (c)	(India) Yuvraj Singh	(Australia) Michael Hussey	(England) Andrew Flintoff	(India) Irfan Pathan	(Australia) Brett Lee	(New Zealand) Shane Bond	(Sri Lanka) Muttiah Muralitharan	(Australia) Andrew Symonds
2007	(Australia) Matthew Hayden	(India) Sachin Tendulkar	(Australia) Ricky Ponting (c)	(England) Kevin Pietersen	(Cricket West Indies) Shivnarine Chanderpaul	(South Africa) Jacques Kallis	(South Africa) Mark Boucher (wk)	(Sri Lanka) Chaminda Vaas	(New Zealand) Shane Bond	(Sri Lanka) Muttiah Muralitharan	(Australia) Glenn McGrath	(Australia) Michael Hussey
2008	(South Africa) Herschelle Gibbs	(India) Sachin Tendulkar	(Australia) Ricky Ponting (c)	(Pakistan) Younis Khan	(Australia) Andrew Symonds	(India) MS Dhoni (wk)	(Sri Lanka) Farveez Maharoof	(New Zealand) Daniel Vettori	(Australia) Brett Lee	(Australia) Mitchell Johnson	(Australia) Nathan Bracken	(Pakistan) Salman Butt
2009	(India) Virender Sehwag	(Cricket West Indies) Chris Gayle	(England) Kevin Pietersen	(Sri Lanka) Tillakaratne Dilshan	(India) Yuvraj Singh	(New Zealand) Martin Guptill	(India) MS Dhoni (c/wk)	(England) Andrew Flintoff	(Sri Lanka) Nuwan Kulasekara	(Sri Lanka) Ajantha Mendis	(Pakistan) Umar Gul	(Sri Lanka) Thilan Thushara
2010	(India) Sachin Tendulkar	(Australia) Shane Watson	(Australia) Michael Hussey	(South Africa) AB de Villiers	(England) Paul Collingwood	(Australia) Ricky Ponting (c)	(India) MS Dhoni (wk)	(New Zealand) Daniel Vettori	(England) Stuart Broad	(Australia) Doug Bollinger	(Australia) Ryan Harris	
2011	(Sri Lanka) Tillakaratne Dilshan	(India) Virender Sehwag	(Sri Lanka) Kumar Sangakkara	(South Africa) AB de Villiers	(Australia) Shane Watson	(India) Yuvraj Singh	(India) MS Dhoni (c/wk)	(England) Graeme Swann	(Pakistan) Umar Gul	(South Africa) Dale Steyn	(India) Zaheer Khan	(Sri Lanka) Lasith Malinga
2012	(India) Gautam Gambhir	(England) Alastair Cook	(Sri Lanka) Kumar Sangakkara	(India) Virat Kohli	(India) MS Dhoni (c/wk)	(Australia) Michael Clarke	(Pakistan) Shahid Afridi	(South Africa) Morné Morkel	(England) Steven Finn	(Sri Lanka) Lasith Malinga	(Pakistan) Saeed Ajmal	(Australia) Shane Watson
2013	(Sri Lanka) Tillakaratne Dilshan	(India) Shikhar Dhawan	(South Africa) Hashim Amla	(Sri Lanka) Kumar Sangakkara	(South Africa) AB de Villiers	(India) MS Dhoni (c/wk)	(India) Ravindra Jadeja	(Pakistan) Saeed Ajmal	(Australia) Mitchell Starc	(England) James Anderson	(Sri Lanka) Lasith Malinga	(New Zealand) Mitchell McClenaghan
2014	(Pakistan) Mohammad Hafeez	(South Africa) Quinton de Kock	(India) Virat Kohli	(Australia) George Bailey	(South Africa) AB de Villiers	(India) MS Dhoni (c/wk)	(Cricket West Indies) Dwayne Bravo	(Australia) James Faulkner	(South Africa) Dale Steyn	(India) Mohammed Shami	(Sri Lanka) Ajantha Mendis	(India) Rohit Sharma
2015	(Sri Lanka) Tillakaratne Dilshan	(South Africa) Hashim Amla	(Sri Lanka) Kumar Sangakkara (wk)	(South Africa) AB de Villiers (c)	(Australia) Steve Smith	(New Zealand) Ross Taylor	(New Zealand) Trent Boult	(India) Mohammed Shami	(Australia) Mitchell Starc	(Bangladesh) Mustafizur Rahman	(South Africa) Imran Tahir	(England) Joe Root
2016	(Australia) David Warner	(South Africa) Quinton de Kock (wk)	(India) Rohit Sharma	(India) Virat Kohli (c)	(South Africa) AB de Villiers	(England) Jos Buttler	(Australia) Mitchell Marsh	(India) Ravindra Jadeja	(Australia) Mitchell Starc	(South Africa) Kagiso Rabada	(Cricket West Indies) Sunil Narine	(South Africa) Imran Tahir
2017	(Australia) David Warner	(India) Rohit Sharma	(India) Virat Kohli (c)	(Pakistan) Babar Azam	(South Africa) AB de Villiers	(South Africa) Quinton de Kock (wk)	(England) Ben Stokes	(New Zealand) Trent Boult	(Pakistan) Hasan Ali	(Afghanistan) Rashid Khan	(India) Jasprit Bumrah	
2018	(India) Rohit Sharma	(England) Jonny Bairstow	(India) Virat Kohli (c)	(England) Joe Root	(New Zealand) Ross Taylor	(England) Jos Buttler (wk)	(England) Ben Stokes	(Bangladesh) Mustafizur Rahman	(Afghanistan) Rashid Khan	(India) Kuldeep Yadav	(India) Jasprit Bumrah	
2019	(India) Rohit Sharma	(Cricket West Indies) Shai Hope	(India) Virat Kohli (c)	(Pakistan) Babar Azam	(New Zealand) Kane Williamson	(England) Ben Stokes	(England) Jos Buttler (wk)	(Australia) Mitchell Starc	(New Zealand) Trent Boult	(India) Mohammed Shami	(India) Kuldeep Yadav	
2021	(Ireland) Paul Stirling	(South Africa) Janneman Malan	(Pakistan) Babar Azam (c)	(Pakistan) Fakhar Zaman	(South Africa) Rassie van der Dussen	(Bangladesh) Shakib Al Hasan	(Bangladesh) Mushfiqur Rahim (wk)	(Sri Lanka) Wanindu Hasaranga	(Bangladesh) Mustafizur Rahman	(Ireland) Simi Singh	(Sri Lanka) Dushmantha Chameera	
2022	(Pakistan) Babar Azam(c)	(Australia) Travis Head	(Cricket West Indies) Shai Hope	(India) Shreyas Iyer	(New Zealand) Tom Latham(wk)	(Zimbabwe) Sikandar Raza	(Bangladesh) Mehidy Hasan	(Cricket West Indies) Alzarri Joseph	(India) Mohammed Siraj	(New Zealand) Trent Boult	(Australia) Adam Zampa	
2023	(India) Rohit Sharma(c)	(India) Shubman Gill	(Australia) Travis Head	(India) Virat Kohli	(New Zealand) Daryl Mitchell	(South Africa) Heinrich Klaasen(wk)	(South Africa) Marco Jansen	(Australia) Adam Zampa	(India) Mohammed Siraj	(India) Kuldeep Yadav	(India) Mohammed Shami	
2024	(Pakistan) Saim Ayub	(Afghanistan) Rahmanullah Gurbaz	(Sri Lanka) Pathum Nissanka	(Sri Lanka) Kusal Mendis (wk)	(Sri Lanka) Charith Asalanka (c)	(Cricket West Indies) Sherfane Rutherford	(Afghanistan) Azmatullah Omarzai	(Sri Lanka) Wanindu Hasaranga	(Pakistan) Shaheen Shah Afridi	(Pakistan) Haris Rauf	(Afghanistan) AM Ghazanfar	

=== T20I Team Of The Decade ===
T20I Team of the Decade
Batting position	Player	Team	Role
Opener	Rohit Sharma	India	Batsman
Opener	Chris Gayle	West Indies	Batsman
Number 3	Aaron Finch	Australia	Batsman
Number 4	Virat Kohli	India	Batsman
Number 5	AB de Villiers	South Africa	Batsman
Number 6	Glenn Maxwell	Australia	All-rounder
Number 7	MS Dhoni	India	Batsman / captain (wk)
Number 8	Kieron Pollard	West Indies	All-rounder
Number 9	Rashid Khan	Afghanistan	Bowler
Number 10	Jasprit Bumrah	India	Bowler
Number 11	Lasith Malinga	Sri Lanka	Bowler

=== T20I Team Of The Year ===
Year	No. 1	No. 2	No. 3	No. 4	No. 5	No. 6	No. 7	No. 8	No. 9	No. 10	No. 11
2021	(England) Jos Buttler	(Pakistan) Mohammad Rizwan	(Pakistan) Babar Azam (c)	(New Zealand) Glenn Phillips	(Australia) Mitchell Marsh	(South Africa) David Miller	(South Africa) Tabraiz Shamsi	(Australia) Josh Hazlewood	(Sri Lanka) Wanindu Hasaranga	(Bangladesh) Mustafizur Rahman	(Pakistan) Shaheen Shah Afridi
2022	(England) Jos Buttler (c) (wk)	(Pakistan) Mohammad Rizwan	(India) Virat Kohli	(India) Suryakumar Yadav	(New Zealand) Glenn Phillips	(Zimbabwe) Sikandar Raza	(India) Hardik Pandya	(England) Sam Curran	(Sri Lanka) Wanindu Hasaranga	(Pakistan) Haris Rauf	(Ireland) Josh Little
2023	(India) Yashaswi Jaiswal	(England) Phil Salt	(Cricket West Indies) Nicholas Pooran (wk)	(India) Suryakumar Yadav (c)	(New Zealand) Mark Chapman	(Zimbabwe) Sikandar Raza	(Uganda) Alpesh Ramjani	(Ireland) Mark Adair	(India) Ravi Bishnoi	(Zimbabwe) Richard Ngarava	(India) Arshdeep Singh
2024	(India) Rohit Sharma (c)	(Australia) Travis Head	(England) Phil Salt	(Pakistan) Babar Azam	(Cricket West Indies) Nicholas Pooran (wk)	(Zimbabwe) Sikandar Raza	(India) Hardik Pandya	(Afghanistan) Rashid Khan	(Sri Lanka) Wanindu Hasaranga	(India) Jasprit Bumrah	(India) Arshdeep Singh

== Women's awards ==
=== Cricketer Of The Decade ===
Year	Winner
2011–2020	(Australia) Ellyse Perry

=== Cricketer of the Year ===
Year	Winner
2006	(Australia) Karen Rolton
2007	(India) Jhulan Goswami
2008	(England) Charlotte Edwards
2009	(England) Claire Taylor
2010	(Australia) Shelley Nitschke
2011	(Cricket West Indies) Stafanie Taylor
2012	Not awarded
2013	Not awarded
2014	Not awarded
2015	Not awarded
2016	Not awarded
2017	(Australia) Ellyse Perry
2018	(India) Smriti Mandhana
2019	(Australia) Ellyse Perry
2021	(India) Smriti Mandhana
2022	(England) Nat Sciver-Brunt
2023	(England) Nat Sciver-Brunt
2024	(New Zealand) Amelia Kerr

=== ODI Cricketer Of The Decade ===
Year	Winner
2011–2020	(Australia) Ellyse Perry

=== ODI Cricketer of the Year ===
Year	Winner
2012	(Cricket West Indies) Stafanie Taylor
2013	(New Zealand) Suzie Bates
2014	(England) Sarah Taylor
2015	(Australia) Meg Lanning
2016	(New Zealand) Suzie Bates
2017	(New Zealand) Amy Satterthwaite
2018	(India) Smriti Mandhana
2019	(Australia) Ellyse Perry
2021	(South Africa) Lizelle Lee
2022	(England) Nat Sciver-Brunt
2023	(Sri Lanka) Chamari Athapaththu
2024	(India) Smriti Mandhana

=== T20I Cricketer Of The Decade ===
Year	Winner
2011–2020	(Australia) Ellyse Perry

=== T20I Cricketer of the Year ===
Year	Winner
2012	(England) Sarah Taylor
2013	(England) Sarah Taylor
2014	(Australia) Meg Lanning
2015	(Cricket West Indies) Stafanie Taylor
2016	(New Zealand) Suzie Bates
2017	(Australia) Beth Mooney
2018	(Australia) Alyssa Healy
2019	(Australia) Alyssa Healy
2021	(England) Tammy Beaumont
2022	(Australia) Tahlia McGrath
2023	(Cricket West Indies) Hayley Matthews
2024	(New Zealand) Amelia Kerr

=== Emerging Cricketer of the Year ===
Year	Winner
2017	(Australia) Beth Mooney
2018	(England) Sophie Ecclestone
2019	(Thailand) Chanida Sutthiruang
2021	(Pakistan) Fatima Sana
2022	(India) Renuka Singh Thakur
2023	(Australia) Phoebe Litchfield
2024	(South Africa) Annerie Dercksen

=== Associate Cricketer of the Year ===
Year	Winner
2021	(Austria) Andrea-Mae Zepeda
2022	(United Arab Emirates) Esha Oza
2023	(Kenya) Queentor Abel
2024	(United Arab Emirates) Esha Oza

=== ODI Team of the Year ===
Year	No. 1	No. 2	No. 3	No. 4	No. 5	No. 6	No. 7	No. 8	No. 9	No. 10	No. 11
2017	(England) Tammy Beaumont	(Australia) Meg Lanning	(India) Mithali Raj	(New Zealand) Amy Satterthwaite	(Australia) Ellyse Perry	(England) Heather Knight (c)	(England) Sarah Taylor (wk)	(South Africa) Dane van Niekerk	(South Africa) Marizanne Kapp	(India) Ekta Bisht	(England) Alex Hartley
2018	(India) Smriti Mandhana	(England) Tammy Beaumont	(New Zealand) Suzie Bates (c)	(South Africa) Dane van Niekerk	(New Zealand) Sophie Devine	(Australia) Alyssa Healy (wk)	(South Africa) Marizanne Kapp	(Cricket West Indies) Deandra Dottin	(Pakistan) Sana Mir	(England) Sophie Ecclestone	(India) Poonam Yadav
2019	(Australia) Alyssa Healy (wk)	(India) Smriti Mandhana	(England) Tammy Beaumont	(Australia) Meg Lanning (c)	(Cricket West Indies) Stafanie Taylor	(Australia) Ellyse Perry	(Australia) Jess Jonassen	(India) Shikha Pandey	(India) Jhulan Goswami	(Australia) Megan Schutt	(India) Poonam Yadav
2021	(South Africa) Lizelle Lee	(Australia) Alyssa Healy(wk)	(England) Tammy Beaumont	(India) Mithali Raj	(England) Heather Knight (c)	(Cricket West Indies) Hayley Matthews	(South Africa) Marizanne Kapp	(South Africa) Shabnim Ismail	(Pakistan) Fatima Sana	(India) Jhulan Goswami	(Cricket West Indies) Anisa Mohammed
2022	(Australia) Alyssa Healy (wk)	(India) Smriti Mandhana	(South Africa) Laura Wolvaardt	(England) Nat Sciver	(Australia) Beth Mooney	(India) Harmanpreet Kaur (c)	(New Zealand) Amelia Kerr	(England) Sophie Ecclestone	(South Africa) Ayabonga Khaka	(India) Renuka Singh	(South Africa) Shabnim Ismail
2023	(Australia) Phoebe Litchfield	(Sri Lanka) Chamari Athapaththu (c)	(Australia) Ellyse Perry	(New Zealand) Amelia Kerr	(Australia) Beth Mooney (wk)	(England) Natalie Sciver	(Australia) Ashleigh Gardner	(Australia) Annabel Sutherland	(South Africa) Nadine de Klerk	(New Zealand) Lea Tahuhu	(Bangladesh) Nahida Akter
2024	(India) Smriti Mandhana	(South Africa) Laura Wolvaardt (c)	(Sri Lanka) Chamari Athapaththu	(Cricket West Indies) Hayley Matthews	(South Africa) Marizanne Kapp	(Australia) Ashleigh Gardner	(Australia) Annabel Sutherland	(England) Amy Jones (wk)	(India) Deepti Sharma	(England) Sophie Ecclestone	(England) Kate Cross

=== T20I Team of the Year ===
Year	No. 1	No. 2	No. 3	No. 4	No. 5	No. 6	No. 7	No. 8	No. 9	No. 10	No. 11
2017	(England) Danielle Wyatt	(Australia) Beth Mooney (wk)	(India) Harmanpreet Kaur	(New Zealand) Sophie Devine	(Cricket West Indies) Stafanie Taylor (c)	(Cricket West Indies) Deandra Dottin	(Cricket West Indies) Hayley Matthews	(Australia) Megan Schutt	(Australia) Amanda-Jade Wellington	(New Zealand) Lea Tahuhu	(India) Ekta Bisht
2018	(India) Smriti Mandhana	(Australia) Alyssa Healy (wk)	(New Zealand) Suzie Bates	(India) Harmanpreet Kaur (c)	(England) Natalie Sciver	(Australia) Ellyse Perry	(Australia) Ashleigh Gardner	(New Zealand) Leigh Kasperek	(Australia) Megan Schutt	(Bangladesh) Rumana Ahmed	(India) Poonam Yadav
2019	(Australia) Alyssa Healy (wk)	(England) Danielle Wyatt	(India) Smriti Mandhana	(Australia) Meg Lanning (c)	(South Africa) Lizelle Lee	(Australia) Ellyse Perry	(India) Deepti Sharma	(Pakistan) Nida Dar	(South Africa) Shabnim Ismail	(Australia) Megan Schutt	(India) Radha Yadav
2021	(India) Smriti Mandhana	(England) Tammy Beaumont	(England) Danielle Wyatt	(Ireland) Gaby Lewis	(England) Natalie Sciver (c)	(England) Amy Jones(wk)	(South Africa) Laura Wolvaardt	(South Africa) Marizanne Kapp	(England) Sophie Ecclestone	(Zimbabwe) Loryn Phiri	(South Africa) Shabnim Ismail
2022	(India) Smriti Mandhana	(Australia) Beth Mooney	(New Zealand) Sophie Devine (c)	(Australia) Ash Gardner	(Australia) Tahila McGrath	(Pakistan) Nida Dar	(India) Deepti Sharma	(India) Richa Ghosh(wk)	(England) Sophie Ecclestone	(Sri Lanka) Inoka Ranaweera	(India) Renuka Singh
2023	(Sri Lanka) Chamari Athapaththu (c)	(Australia) Beth Mooney (wk)	(South Africa) Laura Wolvaardt	(Cricket West Indies) Hayley Matthews	(England) Natalie Sciver	(New Zealand) Amelia Kerr	(Australia) Ellyse Perry	(Australia) Ash Gardner	(India) Deepti Sharma	(England) Sophie Ecclestone	(Australia) Megan Schutt
2024	(South Africa) Laura Wolvaardt (c)	(India) Smriti Mandhana	(Sri Lanka) Chamari Athapaththu	(Cricket West Indies) Hayley Matthews	(England) Nat Sciver-Brunt	(New Zealand) Amelia Kerr	(India) Richa Ghosh (wk)	(South Africa) Marizanne Kapp	(Ireland) Orla Prendergast	(India) Deepti Sharma	(Pakistan) Sadia Iqbal

== Mixed awards ==
=== ICC Umpire of the Year ===
Year	Winner
2004	(Australia) Simon Taufel
2005	(Australia) Simon Taufel
2006	(Australia) Simon Taufel
2007	(Australia) Simon Taufel
2008	(Australia) Simon Taufel
2009	(Pakistan) Aleem Dar
2010	(Pakistan) Aleem Dar
2011	(Pakistan) Aleem Dar
2012	(Sri Lanka) Kumar Dharmasena
2013	(England) Richard Kettleborough
2014	(England) Richard Kettleborough
2015	(England) Richard Kettleborough
2016	(South Africa) Marais Erasmus
2017	(South Africa) Marais Erasmus
2018	(Sri Lanka) Kumar Dharmasena
2019	(England) Richard Illingworth
2021	(South Africa) Marais Erasmus
2022	(England) Richard Illingworth
2023	(England) Richard Illingworth
2024	(England) Richard Illingworth

=== ICC Spirit of Cricket ===
Described by the ICC as being awarded to the teams and players most notable for "upholding the 'Spirit of the Game'", involving respect for:
- Their opponents
- Their own captain and team
- The role of the umpires
- The game's traditional values

Teams

Year	Winner
2004	New Zealand
2005	England
2006	England
2007	Sri Lanka
2008	Sri Lanka
2009	New Zealand
2010	New Zealand
2023	Zimbabwe

Players

Year	Winner
2011	(India) MS Dhoni (Decade)
2012	(New Zealand) Daniel Vettori
2013	(Sri Lanka) Mahela Jayawardene
2014	(England) Katherine Brunt
2015	(New Zealand) Brendon McCullum
2016	(Pakistan) Misbah-ul-Haq
2017	(England) Anya Shrubsole
2018	(New Zealand) Kane Williamson
2019	(India) Virat Kohli
2021	(New Zealand) Daryl Mitchell
2022	(Nepal) Aasif Sheikh

== Defunct awards ==
=== ICC Twenty20 International Performance of the Year ===
In 2021, The award was succeeded by ICC T20I Player of the Year, which is given to a player based on his performance in the whole year. This was from 2008 to 2019, when T20Is weren't usually played frequently enough to have a "Player of the Year" award for this format.

Year	Winner
2008	(India) Yuvraj Singh
2009	(Sri Lanka) Tillakaratne Dilshan
2010	(New Zealand) Brendon McCullum
2011	(New Zealand) Tim Southee
2012	(South Africa) Richard Levi
2013	(Pakistan) Umar Gul
2014	(Australia) Aaron Finch
2015	(South Africa) Faf du Plessis
2016	(Cricket West Indies) Carlos Brathwaite
2017	(India) Yuzvendra Chahal
2018	(Australia) Aaron Finch
2019	(India) Deepak Chahar

=== Captain of the Year ===
Year	Player
2006	(Sri Lanka) Mahela Jayawardene
2007	(Australia) Ricky Ponting

=== Team of the Year ===
Year	Winner	
2010	Format	
2010	Test	ODI
2010	India	Australia

=== Women's Team of the Year ===
Year	No. 1	No. 2	No. 3	No. 4	No. 5	No. 6	No. 7	No. 8	No. 9	No. 10	No. 11	12th woman
2016	(New Zealand) Suzie Bates	(New Zealand) Rachel Priest (wk)	(India) Smriti Mandhana	(Cricket West Indies) Stafanie Taylor (c)	(Australia) Meg Lanning	(Australia) Ellyse Perry	(England) Heather Knight	(Cricket West Indies) Deandra Dottin	(South Africa) Suné Luus	(England) Anya Shrubsole	(New Zealand) Leigh Kasperek	(Ireland) Kim Garth

=== LG People's Choice Award ===
Year	Winner
2010	(India) Sachin Tendulkar
2011	(Sri Lanka) Kumar Sangakkara
2012	(Sri Lanka) Kumar Sangakkara
2013	(India) MS Dhoni
2014	(India) Bhuvneshwar Kumar

=== Fan's Moment of the Year ===
Year	Winner
2018	India winning the Under-19 Cricket World Cup

== Monthly awards ==
In January 2021, the ICC introduced "Player of the Month" awards to recognise cricketers, male and female, that performed best across all forms of international cricket each month. Nominees and winners are determined by an ICC panel of ex-players and journalists, with a public vote having a 10% contribution to the final results.

=== Men's Player of the Month ===
Year	Month											
Year	January	February	March	April	May	June	July	August	September	October	November	December
2021	(India) Rishabh Pant	(India) Ravichandran Ashwin	(India) Bhuvneshwar Kumar	(Pakistan) Babar Azam	(Bangladesh) Mushfiqur Rahim	(New Zealand) Devon Conway	(Bangladesh) Shakib Al Hasan	(England) Joe Root	(Nepal) Sandeep Lamichhane	(Pakistan) Asif Ali	(Australia) David Warner	(New Zealand) Ajaz Patel
2022	(South Africa) Keegan Petersen	(India) Shreyas Iyer	(Pakistan) Babar Azam (2)	(South Africa) Keshav Maharaj	(Sri Lanka) Angelo Mathews	(England) Jonny Bairstow	(Sri Lanka) Prabath Jayasuriya	(Zimbabwe) Sikandar Raza	(Pakistan) Mohammad Rizwan	(India) Virat Kohli	(England) Jos Buttler	(England) Harry Brook
2023	(India) Shubman Gill	(England) Harry Brook (2)	(Bangladesh) Shakib Al Hasan (2)	(Pakistan) Fakhar Zaman	(Ireland) Harry Tector	(Sri Lanka) Wanindu Hasaranga	(England) Chris Woakes	(Pakistan) Babar Azam (3)	(India) Shubman Gill (2)	(New Zealand) Rachin Ravindra	(Australia) Travis Head	(Australia) Pat Cummins
2024	(Cricket West Indies) Shamar Joseph	(India) Yashasvi Jaiswal	(Sri Lanka) Kamindu Mendis	(United Arab Emirates) Muhammad Waseem	(Cricket West Indies) Gudakesh Motie	(India) Jasprit Bumrah	(England) Gus Atkinson	(Sri Lanka) Dunith Wellalage	(Sri Lanka) Kamindu Mendis (2)	(Pakistan) Noman Ali	(Pakistan) Haris Rauf	(India) Jasprit Bumrah (2)
2025	(Cricket West Indies) Jomel Warrican	(India) Shubman Gill (3)	(India) Shreyas Iyer (2)	(Bangladesh) Mehidy Hasan Miraz	(United Arab Emirates) Muhammad Waseem (2)	(South Africa) Aiden Markram	(India) Shubman Gill (4)	(India) Mohammed Siraj	(India) Abhishek Sharma	(South Africa) Senuran Muthusamy	(South Africa) Simon Harmer	(Australia) Mitchell Starc
2026	(New Zealand) Daryl Mitchell	(Pakistan) Sahibzada Farhan	(India) Sanju Samson	(Bangladesh) Nahid Rana	(Bangladesh) Mushfiqur Rahim (2)	(New Zealand) Nathan Smith	(Cricket West Indies) Justin Greaves	(Sri Lanka) Sonal Dinusha	(India) Shubman Gill (5)	(South Africa) Marco Jansen		

=== Women's Player of the Month ===
Year	Month											
Year	January	February	March	April	May	June	July	August	September	October	November	December
2021	(South Africa) Shabnim Ismail	(England) Tammy Beaumont	(South Africa) Lizelle Lee	(Australia) Alyssa Healy	(Scotland) Kathryn Bryce	(England) Sophie Ecclestone	(Cricket West Indies) Stafanie Taylor	(Ireland) Eimear Richardson	(England) Heather Knight	(Ireland) Laura Delany	(Cricket West Indies) Hayley Matthews	No award
2022	(England) Heather Knight (2)	(New Zealand) Amelia Kerr	(Australia) Rachael Haynes	(Australia) Alyssa Healy (2)	(Pakistan) Tuba Hassan	(South Africa) Marizanne Kapp	(England) Emma Lamb	(Australia) Tahlia McGrath	(India) Harmanpreet Kaur	(Pakistan) Nida Dar	(Pakistan) Sidra Ameen	(Australia) Ashleigh Gardner
2023	(England) Grace Scrivens	(Australia) Ashleigh Gardner (2)	(Rwanda) Henriette Ishimwe	(Thailand) Naruemol Chaiwai	(Thailand) Thipatcha Putthawong	(Australia) Ashleigh Gardner (4)		(Ireland) Arlene Kelly	(Sri Lanka) Chamari Athapaththu	(Cricket West Indies) Hayley Matthews (2)	(Bangladesh) Nahida Akter	(India) Deepti Sharma
2024	(Ireland) Amy Hunter	(Australia) Annabel Sutherland	(England) Maia Bouchier	(Cricket West Indies) Hayley Matthews (3)	(Sri Lanka) Chamari Athapaththu (2)	(India) Smriti Mandhana	(Sri Lanka) Chamari Athapaththu (3)	(Sri Lanka) Harshitha Samarawickrama	(England) Tammy Beaumont (2)	(New Zealand) Amelia Kerr (2)	(England) Danni Wyatt-Hodge	(Australia) Annabel Sutherland (2)
2025	(Australia) Beth Mooney	(Australia) Alana King	(Australia) Georgia Voll	(Scotland) Kathryn Bryce	(South Africa) Chloe Tryon	(Cricket West Indies) Hayley Matthews (4)	(England) Sophia Dunkley	(Ireland) Orla Prendergast	(India) Smriti Mandhana (2)	(South Africa) Laura Wolvaardt	(India) Shafali Verma	(South Africa) Laura Wolvaardt (2)
2026	(Bangladesh) Sobhana Mostary	(India) Arundhati Reddy	(New Zealand) Amelia Kerr (3)	(South Africa) Laura Wolvaardt (3)	(England) Lauren Bell	(England) Danni Wyatt-Hodge (2)	(Cricket West Indies) Hayley Matthews (5)	(Isle of Man) Lucy Barnett	(India) Shafali Verma (2)	(India) Deepti Sharma (2)		

== Awards by country ==
Country	Men's Cricketer of the Year/Decade	Women's Cricketer of the Year/Decade	Men's Test Cricketer of the Year/Decade	Men's ODI Cricketer of the Year / Decade	Women's ODI Cricketer of the Year / Decade	Men's T20I Cricketer of the Year / Decade	Women's T20I Cricketer of the Year / Decade	Men's Emerging Cricketer of the Year	Women's Emerging Cricketer of the Year	Total awards
Australia	7	5	8	2	3	0	6	4	2	37
India	7	3	6	8	2	3	0	3	1	33
England	3	4	3	2	2	0	3	4	1	22
South Africa	1	0	2	4	1	0	0	1	1	10
Pakistan	2	0	1	2	0	1	0	1	1	8
West Indies	1	1	0	0	1	0	2	2	0	7
Sri Lanka	1	0	1	2	1	0	0	2	0	7
New Zealand	0	1	0	0	3	0	2	1	0	7
Afghanistan	0	0	0	1	0	1	0	0	0	2
Bangladesh	0	0	0	0	0	0	0	1	0	1
Thailand	0	0	0	0	0	0	0	0	1	1

== Development Awards ==
The ICC Development Awards was launched in 2002, to recognise the ICC associate member nations for its innovative development programmes and inspiring efforts on the field of play.
ICC introduced a new set of awards in 2019. The six categories were: Gray-Nicholls Participation Programme of the Year (now. ICC Development Initiative of the Year), 100% Cricket Women’s Cricket Initiative of the Year, ICC Associate Member Men’s Performance of the Year, ICC Associate Member Women’s Performance of the Year, ICC Digital Fan Engagement of the Year and Cricket 4 Good Social Impact Initiative of the Year. The Global winner in each category is chosen from the Regional winners coming from all five ICC regions.

ICC announces the award winners every year separately to annual ICC Awards.

=== ICC Development Initiative of the Year ===
Year	Global Winner	Regional Winners (Nominees)
2019	(Papua New Guinea) PNG (EAP)	Botswana (ACA); Malaysia (ACC); Netherlands (EUR); Brazil (AME)
2020	Argentina (AME)	Namibia (ACA); Nepal (ACC); Italy (EUR); Vanuatu (EAP)
2021	Namibia (ACA)	Hong Kong (ACC); Netherlands (EUR); Argentina (AME); Indonesia (EAP)
2022	Namibia (ACA)	Hong Kong (ACC); Serbia (EUR); Peru (AME); Indonesia (EAP)
2023	Mexico (AME)	Nigeria (ACA); Qatar (ACC); Italy(EUR) (Papua New Guinea) PNG (EAP)
2024	Namibia (ACA)	Malaysia (ACC); Greece (EUR); Indonesia (EAP); Brazil (AME)

=== 100% Cricket Female Cricket Initiative of the Year ===
Year	Global Winner	Regional Winners (Nominees)
2019	Rwanda (ACA)	Bhutan (ACC); Scotland (EUR); Chile (AME); Indonesia (EAP)
2020	Brazil (AME)	Nigeria (ACA); Malaysia (ACC); Denmark (EUR); Samoa (EAP)
2021	Bahrain (ACC)	Sierra Leone (ACA); Germany (EUR) (United States) USA (AME); Vanuatu (EAP)
2022	Nigeria (ACA)	Nepal (ACC); Romania (EUR); None (AME) (Papua New Guinea) PNG (EAP)
2023	Oman (ACC)	Sierra Leone (ACA); Belgium (EUR); Costa Rica (AME); Japan (EAP)
2024	Bhutan (ACC); Vanuatu (EAP)	Sierra Leone (ACA); Spain (EUR); Brazil (AME)

=== ICC Associate Member Men’s Performance of the Year ===
Year	Global Winner	Regional Winners (Nominees)
2019	Namibia (ACA)	NA
2020	Not Awarded	NA
2021	Namibia (ACA)	(United Arab Emirates) UAE (ACC); Scotland (EUR); Argentina (AME) (Papua New Guinea) PNG (EAP)
2022	Namibia (ACA)	(United Arab Emirates) UAE (ACC); Netherlands (EUR); None (AME); Japan (EAP)
2023	Netherlands (EUR)	Sierra Leone (ACA); Oman (ACC); Canada (AME); Indonesia (EAP)
2024	United States (AME)	Uganda (ACA) (United Arab Emirates) UAE (ACC); Guernsey (EUR); Japan (EAP)

=== ICC Associate Member Women’s Performance of the Year ===
Year	Global Winner	Regional Winners (Nominees)
2019	Thailand (ACC)	NA
2020	Not Awarded	NA
2021	Thailand (ACC)	Namibia (ACA); Scotland (EUR); Brazil (AME); None (EAP)
2022	Rwanda (ACA)	Thailand (ACC); Scotland (EUR); Argentina (AME); Indonesia (EAP)
2023	(United Arab Emirates) UAE (ACC)	Sierra Leone (ACA); Scotland (EUR); Argentina (AME); Indonesia (EAP)
2024	Scotland (EUR)	Nigeria (ACA) (United Arab Emirates) UAE (ACC); None (AME); Indonesia (EAP)

=== ICC Digital Fan Engagement Initiative of the Year ===
Year	Global Winner	Regional Winners (Nominees)
2019	Finland (EUR)	NA
2020	Vanuatu (EAP)	Namibia (ACA); Kuwait (ACC); Jersey (EUR) (United States) USA (AME)
2021	Estonia (EUR)	Kuwait (ACC); Uganda (ACA); Canada (AME) (Papua New Guinea) PNG (EAP)
2022	Uganda (ACA)	Bahrain (ACC); Finland (EUR); None (AME); Japan (EAP)
2023	Nepal (ACC)	Namibia (ACA); Netherlands (EUR); Bermuda (AME); Indonesia (EAP)
2024	Nepal (ACC)	Namibia (ACA); None (EUR); Bermuda (AME); Indonesia (EAP)

=== Cricket 4 Good Social Impact Initiative of the Year ===
Year	Global Winner	Regional Winners (Nominees)
2019	Japan (ACC)	NA
2020	Uganda (ACA)	Bhutan (ACC); Italy (EUR); Peru (AME); Indonesia (EAP)
2021	Nigeria (ACA)	Bhutan (ACC); Italy (EUR); Peru (AME); Samoa (EAP)
2022	Namibia (ACA)	Bhutan (ACC); Croatia (EUR); Brazil (AME); Fiji (EAP)
2023	Scotland (EUR)	Sierra Leone (ACA); Bahrain (ACC); Mexico (AME); Samoa (EAP)
2024	Indonesia (EAP)	Qatar (ACC); Kenya (ACA); Switzerland (EUR); Chile (AME)

=== ICC criiio Cricket Festival of the Year ===
Year	Global Winner	Nominees
2024	Tanzania	Nepal (United Arab Emirates) UAE; Indonesia; Saudi Arabia

== Past methodology ==
The judging/voting period was originally from 1 August of the current year to 31 July of the next year. It then underwent two changes and used to take place between September of the current year and September of the next year.

The ICC Selection Committee comprised eminent former players (one chairman, four other members) who selected the finalists for the Cricketer of the Year, Test Player of the Year, ODI Player of the Year and the Emerging Player of the Year, as well as the final ICC Test Team of the Year and ICC ODI Team of the Year.

ICC Selection Committee
Year	Chairman	Members			
2004	(Australia) Richie Benaud	(England) Ian Botham	(India) Sunil Gavaskar	(Cricket West Indies) Michael Holding	(South Africa) Barry Richards
2005	(India) Sunil Gavaskar	(England) David Gower	(New Zealand) Richard Hadlee	(Australia) Rod Marsh	(Cricket West Indies) Courtney Walsh
2006	(India) Sunil Gavaskar	(South Africa) Allan Donald	(Australia) Ian Healy	(Sri Lanka) Arjuna Ranatunga	(Pakistan) Waqar Younis
2007	(India) Sunil Gavaskar	(New Zealand) Chris Cairns	(South Africa) Gary Kirsten	(Pakistan) Iqbal Qasim	(England) Alec Stewart
2008	(Cricket West Indies) Clive Lloyd	(Australia) Greg Chappell	(South Africa) Shaun Pollock	(Sri Lanka) Sidath Wettimuny	(Bangladesh) Athar Ali Khan
2009	(Cricket West Indies) Clive Lloyd	(India) Anil Kumble	(Pakistan) Mudassar Nazar	(New Zealand) Stephen Fleming	(England) Bob Taylor
2010	(Cricket West Indies) Clive Lloyd	(England) Angus Fraser	(Zimbabwe) Duncan Fletcher	(Australia) Matthew Hayden	(India) Ravi Shastri
2011	(Cricket West Indies) Clive Lloyd	(South Africa) Paul Adams	(Pakistan) Zaheer Abbas	(New Zealand) Danny Morrison	(England) Mike Gatting
2012	(Cricket West Indies) Clive Lloyd	(Sri Lanka) Marvan Atapattu	(Australia) Tom Moody	(Cricket West Indies) Carl Hooper	(England) Clare Connor
2013	(India) Anil Kumble	(England) Alec Stewart	(New Zealand) Catherine Campbell	(Pakistan) Waqar Younis	(South Africa) Graeme Pollock
2014	(India) Anil Kumble	(England) Jonathan Agnew	(Sri Lanka) Russel Arnold	(New Zealand) Stephen Fleming	(Netherlands) Betty Timmer
2015	(India) Anil Kumble	(Cricket West Indies) Ian Bishop	(England) Mark Butcher	(Australia) Belinda Clark	(India) Gundappa Viswanath

The final selection for the awards were previously voted on by an academy of 56 (expanded from 50 in 2004–05), which included current national team captains of Test playing nations (10), members of the Elite panel of ICC umpires and referees (18), prominent former players and cricket correspondents (28). In the event of a tie in the voting, awards are shared.

== Awards by year ==
- 2004 ICC Awards
- 2005 ICC Awards
- 2006 ICC Awards
- 2007 ICC Awards
- 2008 ICC Awards
- 2009 ICC Awards
- 2010 ICC Awards
- 2011 ICC Awards
- 2012 ICC Awards
- 2013 ICC Awards
- 2014 ICC Awards
- 2015 ICC Awards
- 2016 ICC Awards
- 2017 ICC Awards
- 2018 ICC Awards
- 2019 ICC Awards
- 2011–2020 ICC Awards of the Decade
- 2021 ICC Awards
- 2022 ICC Awards
- 2023 ICC Awards
- 2024 ICC Awards
