= CricHQ =

Digital platform for sport

cricHQ
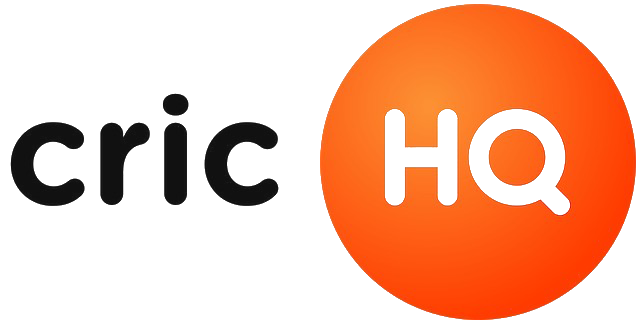
- Company type: Private
- Founded: 2010
- Headquarters: Wellington, New Zealand
- Area served: Worldwide
- Industry: Cricket
- Website: www.crichq.com

cricHQ is a digital platform for sport which combines competition management and administration software with live scoring and statistics for cricket clubs. It is based in Wellington, New Zealand, and was set up by CEO Simon Baker and former New Zealand cricketers Stephen Fleming and Brendon McCullum. It manages the administration of cricket test countries New Zealand, Sri Lanka, South Africa and Zimbabwe. A number of other national governing bodies also use its services from club level upwards (see National Governing Bodies section below).

The company provides a range of digital services to cricket organisations that typically use paper-based administration and scoring. The services include instant updates for fans, performance insights for coaches and the ability to set up cricket-related social networks. It also makes it easier to register players, organise competition draws and analyse demographics of sport participants.

When the app was launched it was briefly one of the world's most downloaded sporting apps and since then it has amassed over 1 million Facebook fans.

The company has been described as "one of New Zealand’s largely unsung tech success stories" by one of New Zealand's leading technology journalists.

In October 2016, cricHQ's then-Executive Chair, Mike Loftus, was invited to visit India with New Zealand's Prime Minister, John Key, as part of a trade delegation.

In December 2016, former Saatchi & Saatchi Chair and CEO Kevin Roberts was appointed as Chair of cricHQ's board.

In October 2017, . cricHQ was purchased by a Playmaker Labs New Zealand and continues to trade. Peter Dowell is the Chairman of Playmaker Labs

== Video content ==
In 2017, cricHQ acquired My Action Sport, a sportstech company based in Bristol. My Action Sport provides cameras and the capability for sports teams to livestream their games and to package up highlights to be hosted online. With cricHQ's customer base, the acquisition of My Action Replay could make cricHQ the largest broadcaster of cricket in the world.

== Investment ==
In June 2015 cricHQ raised US$10m from Singapore private equity firm Tembusu Partners to expand globally including a doubling of staff in India, the world's largest cricketing nation.

In September 2016 it was revealed that cricHQ was seeking further investment of US$10M and was in discussions with investment bankers in the United States and United Kingdom. It also stated that the company was valued at US$70M while forecast to make a loss of more than US$4m in the 2016/17 financial year.

Incoming Chair Kevin Roberts revealed that he had invested a "seven figure" sum in the company in December 2016.

== National governing bodies ==
As well as having a partnership with the International Cricket Council, cricHQ signed Hong Kong as its 50th cricketing national governing body in August 2016. As of May 2023, 54 national governing bodies have been signed. The full list of National Governing Bodies that cricHQ has signed with is:

- New Zealand
- South Africa
- Sri Lanka
- Bhutan
- Afghanistan
- Belgium
- Botswana
- Canada
- France
- Germany
- Gibraltar
- Guernsey
- Ireland
- Japan
- Jersey
- Namibia
- Nepal
- Papua New Guinea
- Scotland
- Singapore
- Arab Emirates
- USA
- Vanuatu
- Zambia
- Austria
- Chile
- Cook Islands
- Cyprus
- Estonia
- Finland
- Hungary
- Indonesia
- Malawi
- Maldives
- Malta
- Mexico
- Norway
- Oman
- Philippines
- Portugal
- Russia
- Sierra Leone
- Taiwan
- Vietnam
- Czech Republic
- Nigeria
- Brazil
- Qatar
- Rwanda
- Hong Kong
- Trinidad & Tobago

== Awards ==
- In May 2017, cricHQ won the Best-Integrated Digital Media award at the Sports Technology Awards, a global award recognising the best in Sports Tech in the world
- In March 2017, cricHQ was shortlisted as a finalist in the UK Sports Technology Awards in the Best-Integrated Digital Media category.
- In September 2016, cricHQ was announced as a finalist in the New Zealand Innovation Awards in the Innovation in technology solutions section and as the Emerging New Zealand innovator. cricHQ was highly commended in the Emerging Innovator award
- In July 2016, cricHQ won the Excellence in Software Award at the New Zealand Excellence in IT Awards.
- cricHQ was awarded a National Award for Excellence in Digital Marketing & Social Media at the 2016 CMO Asia Awards for its #ICareISupport campaign to help raise money for drought-stricken farmers in Maharashtra.

== Unplanned Downtime ==
In August 2024, during the middle of the English cricket season, CricHQ's website went offline for a week before being replaced by a splash page saying 'unplanned downtime'. The site was then down for continuously since the summer of 2024.

Teams and leagues who had previously used CricHQ are unable to see or have access to their data.

In 2026, the CricHQ website no longer displays any relative information relating to CricHQ and remains a closed link, with no explanations or any additional information towards club and player data that was stored on their servers.
