= Club San Albano =

Argentine sports club

(Argentina) San Albano
- Full name: Club San Albano
- Union: URBA
- Founded: 10 February 1923; 103 years ago
- Location: Burzaco, Argentina
- Ground: Predio Corimayo
- President: Fernando Roel
- Coach(es): Federico Wulf; Brian Elder
- League: Primera A
- 2026: 13th. (relegated)
Team kit

Official website
- clubsanalbano.com

Maurice Runnacles Oval
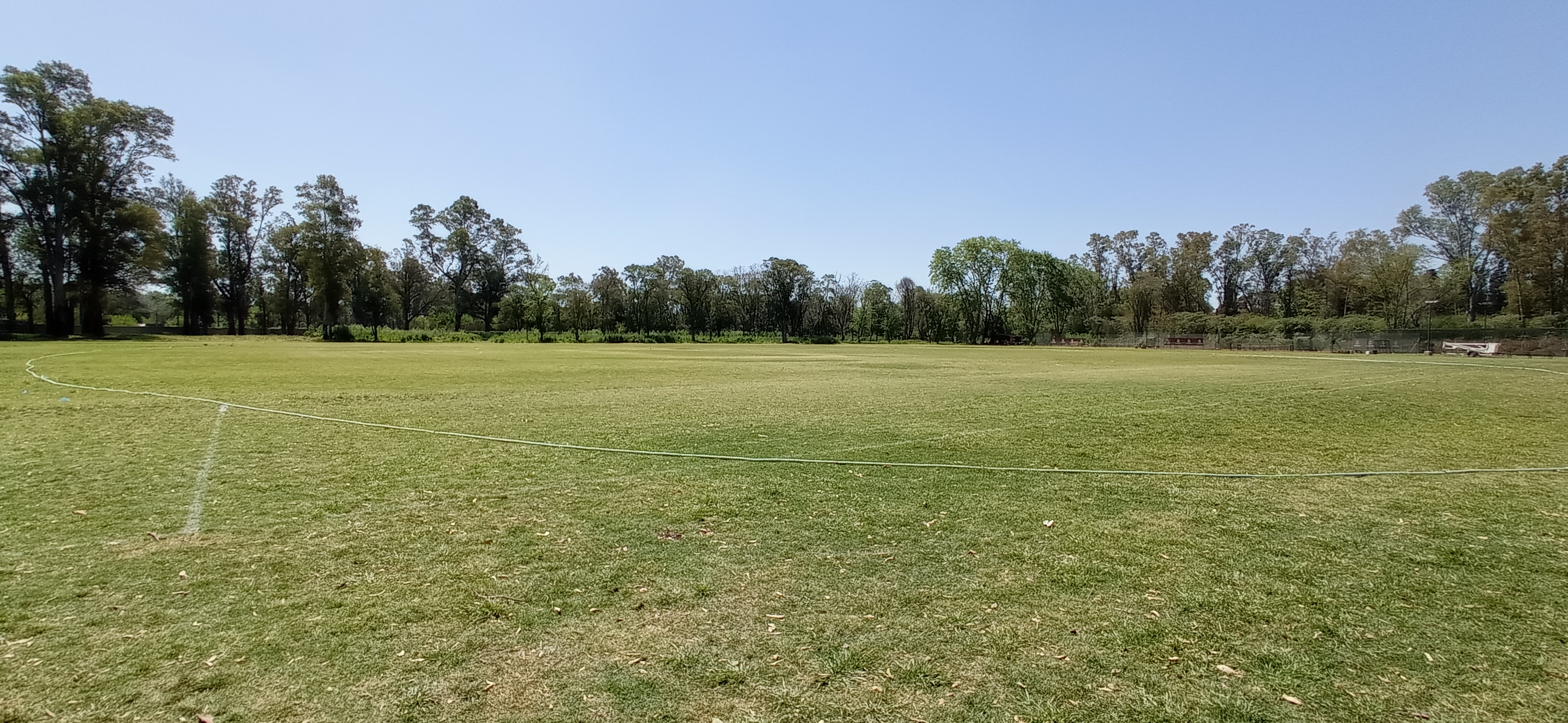
- The cricket field as seen in 2023
- Interactive map of Maurice Runnacles Oval

Ground information
- Location: Predio Corimayo, Burzaco
- Owner: Club San Albano

International information
- First men's T20I: 21 February 2023: Argentina v Bermuda
- Last men's T20I: 30 November 2025: Argentina v Brazil
- First women's T20I: 13 October 2023: Argentina v Chile
- Last women's T20I: 10 March 2025: Argentina v Brazil
- As of 16 December 2024; Source: Cricinfo

Club San Albano, also known as the St. Albans Club, is an Argentine sports club from the Burzaco district of Almirante Brown Partido. San Albano is mostly known for its rugby union team, which currently plays in Primera División A, the second division of the Unión de Rugby de Buenos Aires league system. The field hockey team competes at tournaments organized by the Buenos Aires Hockey Association. As of 2023, the club had more than 350 female field hockey players registered.

Other sports currently practised at San Albano are cricket and tennis. San Albano has 1,800 members, is regarded as one of the most emblematic British-origin clubs in southern Greater Buenos Aires.

== History ==
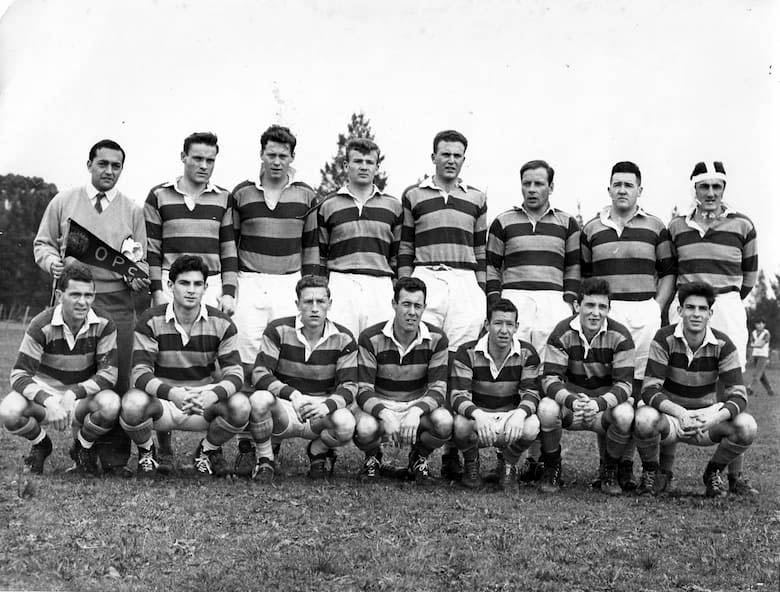
San Albano team of 1960 that promoted to Primera División

San Albano (named after Christian martyr Saint Alban) was founded on 10 February 1923 by alumni of the Quilmes Grammar School and the later Saint Alban's College. Originally born as a cricket club with the name of "Old Philomathian Club" (the name refers to the inscription of Philomathes Polymathes in the school badge). Nevertheless it was not until 1928 when the institution starting the practise of sports when it registered a cricket team to the Argentine Cricket Association. The team was captained by Otto Hawkins.

One year later, Old Philomathian registered a football team to the British Saturday Football League, an amateur local league, to play in the second división. A.W. Hopson and Errol Merness were the captains of that team that played their home venues at Argentino de Banfield.

Between 1939 and 1945, 124 former students of St. Alban's fought for the British Army in the World War II.

Old Philomathian fielded a rugby team for the first time in 1949, being mentored by BAC&RC and Old Georgian. The club registered with the Argentine Rugby Union that same year, starting to play in the third division.

After two consecutive seasons finishing 2nd., in 1956 Old Philomathians promoted to Segunda División after finishing unbeaten. In 1960 the club promoted to the first division, although it went straight back down a year later. For the first years of its existence, Old Philomathian achieved more success in the sevens version of the game, winning the Argentine Rugby Union tournament in 1958. Field hockey started being played at the club in 1967, taking part in men's and women's tournaments.

The institution would be later forced to change its name in 1974 from the former Old Philomathian Club to "Asociación de Ex-Alumnos del Colegio San Albano" due to administrative regulations. From humble beginnings, San Albano reached the first division in 2002 and has remained there since then.

In 1981, San Albano acquired a land on Av. Espora, in the "Corimayo" neighborhood of Burzaco, that would remain as its definitive location up to present days. San Albano built an artificial turf field hockey pitch in 2009, which facilitated the growth of the sport in the club. That same year the club also inaugurated new tennis courts that hosted the "Copa Almirante Brown", a tournament where notable players such as David Nalbandian, Juan Mónaco, and Ignacio Chela took part.

At the end of the 2026 season, San Albano was relegated to Primera B (third division) after finishing 13th out of 14.

== Facilities ==
Club's headquarters are located on Av. Espora in Burzaco, where the rugby, cricket and field hockey fields are located. There are two grounds for cricket (the "Maurice Runnacles Oval", named after a notable cricketer of the club, and "Cancha 2"). The Maurice Runnacles Oval was one of the venues that hosted the 2023 ICC Men's T20 World Cup Americas Qualifier.

== Notable players ==
- John Edward Vibart (1931–2017), the only San Albano rugby footballer that played for Argentina. He was with San Albano since the club started its steps in rugby in 1947, being part of the team that made its official debut in 1949. After his retirement as player, Vibart was president of the club in two periods (1964–66, and 1974–78). He is considered the most legendary figure of the club. The club organised a competition ("Copa John Vibart") in his honour.

== Honours ==
=== Cricket ===
San Albano is one of the most successful teams in Argentine cricket, having won 11 championships to date.

- Primera División (11):
  - 1992–93, 1995–96, 1998–99, 1999–00, 2004–05, 2006–07, 2008–09, 2011–12, 2015–16, 2017–18, 2018–19
