= List of Isle of Man women Twenty20 International cricketers =

This is a list of Manx women Twenty20 International cricketers. A Women's Twenty20 International (WT20I) is an international cricket match between two representative teams. A T20I is played under the rules of Twenty20 cricket. In April 2018, the International Cricket Council (ICC) granted full international status to Twenty20 women's matches played between member sides from 1 July 2018 onwards. Isle of Man women played their first WT20I on 12 November 2022 against Norway during the 2022 Spain Women's Pentangular Series.

The list is arranged in the order in which each player won her first Twenty20 cap. Where more than one player won her first Twenty20 cap in the same match, those players are listed alphabetically by surname.

== Key ==
General

- ‡ – Captain
- † – Wicket-keeper
- First – Year of debut
- Last – Year of latest game
- Mat – Number of matches played

Batting

- Runs – Runs scored in career
- HS – Highest score
- Avg – Runs scored per dismissal
- * – Batsman remained not out
- 50 – Number of half centuries
- 100 – Number of centuries

Bowling

- Balls – Balls bowled in career
- Wkt – Wickets taken in career
- BBI – Best bowling in an innings
- Ave – Average runs per wicket

Fielding

- Ca – Catches taken
- St – Stumpings affected

== Players ==
Statistics are correct as of 30 August 2026.

Isle of Man women T20I cricketers
General					Batting					Bowling				Fielding		Ref
No.	Name	First	Last	Mat	Runs	HS	Avg	50	100	Balls	Wkt	BBI	Ave	Ca	St	Ref
1	Lucy Barnett‡	2022	2026	38	1,479	123*	56.88	14	1	818	39	3/10	13.05	12	0	
2	Kim Carney	2022	2025	30	317	58*	15.85	1	0	–	–	–	–	1	0	
3	Ellan Cleator	2022	2025	26	261	39	15.35	0	0	–	–	–	–	9	0	
4	Rebecca Corkish	2022	2022	3	2	2	2.00	0	0	12	1	1/15	15.00	0	0	
5	Clare Crowe‡	2022	2026	19	80	25	6.66	0	0	9	0	–	–	1	0	
6	Joanne Hicks	2022	2026	31	23	9*	4.60	0	0	570	39	5/10	10.61	14	0	
7	Danielle Murphy	2022	2025	28	58	27	7.25	0	0	395	22	4/18	19.27	6	0	
8	Rachel Overman	2022	2026	22	96	20*	6.85	0	0	18	0	–	–	10	0	
9	Catherine Perry	2022	2025	35	47	14*	4.27	0	0	700	28	4/10	24.64	4	0	
10	Alanya Thorpe‡	2022	2026	34	75	29*	7.50	0	0	508	30	4/24	16.36	5	0	
11	Rebecca Webster†	2022	2025	31	151	25	10.78	0	0	–	–	–	–	12	5	
12	Kira Buchan	2022	2022	2	10	9	10.00	0	0	12	0	–	–	0	0	
13	Andrea Littlejohns	2022	2025	20	124	30	10.33	0	0	–	–	–	–	4	0	
14	Jasmin Pullen†	2022	2025	2	4	2	1.33	0	0	–	–	–	–	1	0	
15	Caitlin Henery	2023	2025	29	410	71*	24.11	3	0	364	20	4/6	15.60	9	0	
16	Bliss Murtagh	2023	2023	7	2	2*	–	0	0	102	5	2/5	20.80	0	0	
17	Emma Miller	2023	2023	5	9	9	9.00	0	0	12	1	1/29	29.00	1	0	
18	Finnola Martin	2023	2024	5	–	–	–	–	–	52	2	1/11	29.50	0	0	
19	Sam Hassall	2024	2025	18	68	16*	5.66	0	0	–	–	–	–	7	0	
20	Georgina Ford	2025	2026	10	16	7*	3.20	0	0	157	4	2/9	44.50	2	0	
21	Lola Hornby-Wheeler	2025	2025	5	0	0	0.00	0	0	54	2	2/14	29.50	0	0	
22	Libby Moore‡	2025	2026	7	65	24*	10.83	0	0	–	–	–	–	0	1	
23	Robyn Stones†	2025	2025	2	0	0	0.00	0	0	–	–	–	–	0	1	
24	Georgina Ford	2026	2026	4	6	4	3.00	0	0	66	1	1/4	93.00	0	0	
25	Chloe Dillon	2026	2026	3	11	6	3.60	0	0	–	–	–	–	0	0	
26	Grace Cottier	2026	2026	4	24	19*	–	0	0	36	2	1/22	25.50	1	0	
27	Isabella Clarke	2026	2026	4	0	0*	–	0	0	60	5	3/9	11.00	0	0	
28	Anna Wilson	2026	2026	2	0	0	0.00	0	0	–	–	–	–	0	0	
29	Maisie Skillan	2026	2026	2	0	0	0.00	0	0	–	–	–	–	0	0	
