= Cricket in Indonesia =

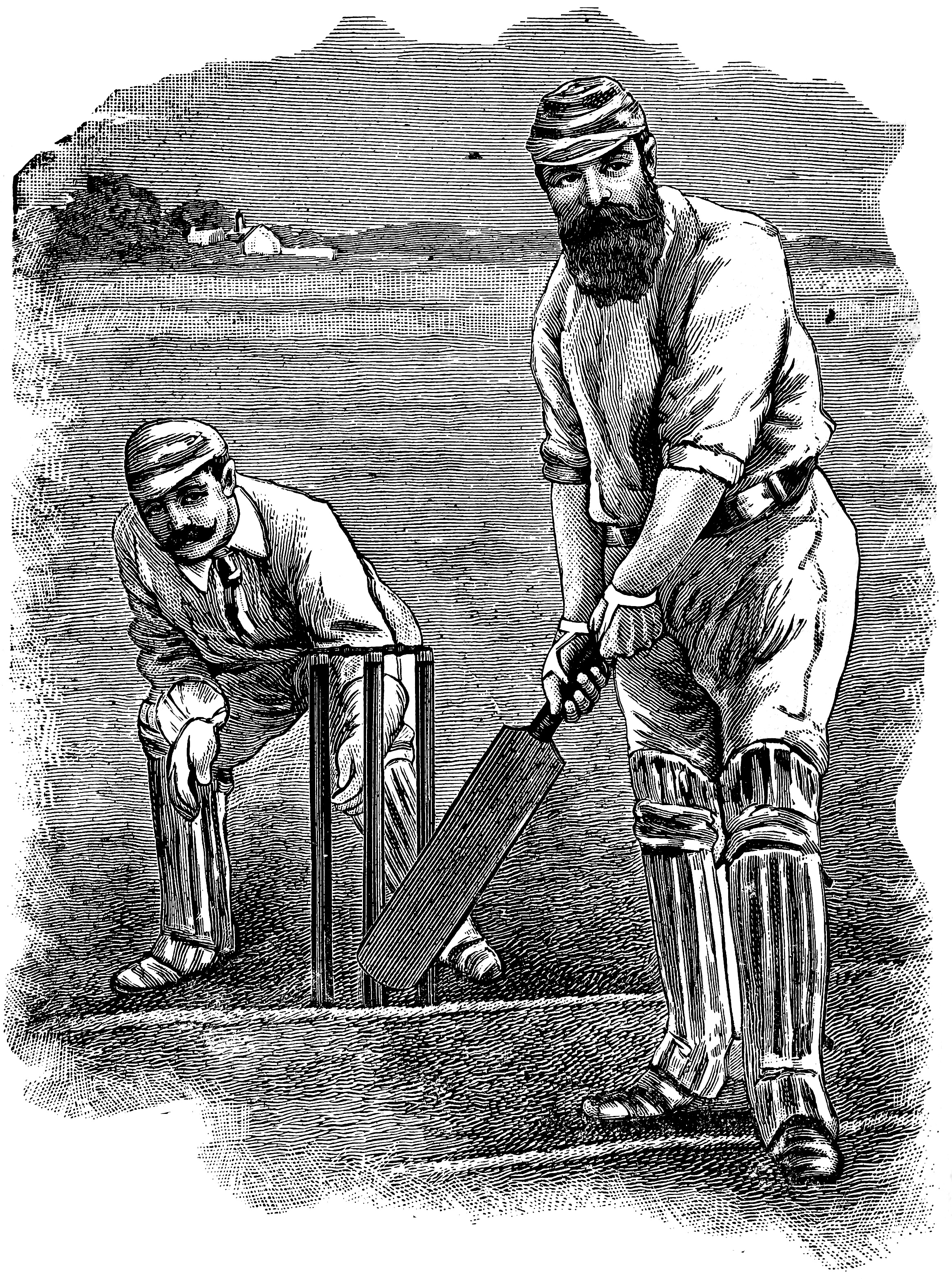

Cricket is a minor sport in Indonesia. Although the sport has been played in the country since the 1880s, the national governing body, Cricket Indonesia, was only formed in 2000. It gained membership of the International Cricket Council (ICC) the following year, and the Indonesian national team made its debut in 2002.

== History ==
=== Early years ===
Cricket was introduced to colonial Indonesia (the Dutch East Indies) in the early 1880s, by Dutch workers. The 1883 eruption of Krakatoa was reported to have interrupted a match being played in Batavia (present-day Jakarta), by the members of the Bataviasche Cricket Club. That club was joined in September 1893 by the Bataviasche Cricket-Football Club, which was incorporated in May 1894. Cricket and association football were introduced to the country around the same time, and many of the early clubs played both sports. Gymnastiek Vereeniging, founded in Medan in November 1887, was one such club, and in 1890 played fixtures in both sports against a club from Penang (in present-day Malaysia). The Singapore Cricket Club was also reported to have visited. The rise of cricket in the Dutch East Indies coincided with a decline in popularity in the Netherlands, as many Dutch players moved to the colonies. However, Dutchmen were not the sport's only players, with at least one club in Batavia being formed by the British community. That city maintained a cricket ground until the 1960s, on the site of the present National Monument.

=== Recent years ===
The recent history of cricket in Indonesia began in 1981, when the International Sports Club of Indonesia established a cricket section. Indonesia's first cricket league was established in 1992, when the Jakarta Cricket Association (JCA) was founded. Outside of Jakarta, leagues were established in the provinces of Bali and East Nusa Tenggara in the 1990s, and in West Java in the 2000s. The Indonesia Cricket Foundation (now known as Cricket Indonesia) was founded in 2000 by representatives from the Bali and Jakarta leagues. It gained affiliate membership of the ICC in 2001, and an Indonesian national team made its international debut the following year, in a four-team tournament in Perth, Australia, that also featured Japan and South Korea. The national side has since regularly played in ICC East Asia-Pacific regional tournaments. Cricket Indonesia has emphasized on expanding cricket into schools, and in both 2008 and 2009 won ICC development awards for its Ultra Milk Development Programme, which "reached over 22,000 students in 500 schools". A 2010 Jakarta Post article reported that cricket was played by 30,000 Indonesians across 14 provinces. Despite not being included in the original programme, cricket has been included as a sport at the 2018 Asian Games (to be hosted by Jakarta and Palembang), following lobbying efforts by Cricket Indonesia and the Olympic Council of Asia.

== Players ==
At least three first-class cricketers are known to have been born in present-day Indonesia, all of whom were of British descent:

- John Butterworth (1905–1941), played at first-class level for Middlesex and Oxford University
- Reginald Butterworth (1906–1940), played at first-class level for Middlesex and Oxford University
- Frederick Cook (1870–1915), played at Test level for South Africa and first-class level for Eastern Province
