= Lucy Barnett =

Isle of Man cricketer (born 2006)

Personal information
- Born: 6 October 2006 (age 20); Isle of Man
- Batting: Right-handed
- Bowling: Right arm Off break
- Role: All-rounder

International information
- National side: Isle of Man (2022–present)
- T20I debut (cap 1): 12 November 2022 v Norway
- Last T20I: 30 August 2026 v Turkey

Domestic team information
- Years: Team
- 2025: Herefordshire

Career statistics
Competition	WT20I
Matches	38
Runs scored	1,479
Batting average	56.88
100s/50s	1/14
Top score	123*
Balls bowled	818
Wickets	39
Bowling average	13.05
5 wickets in innings	0
10 wickets in match	0
Best bowling	3/10
Catches/stumpings	12/–
- Source: Cricinfo, 30 August 2026

Lucy Barnett (born 6 October 2006) is a cricketer who plays for the Isle of Man women's cricket team. She is the first player from her country to score a century in a WT20I. As of September 2026, Barnett holds the record for the youngest player to reach 1,000 WT20I runs. She is also the first player from the Isle of Man, male or female, to win an ICC Player of the Month Award.

== Early life ==
Barnett attended St Ninian's High School, Douglas.

== Career ==
Aged 16, Barnett opened the bowling and batting as she won player of the match in the Isle of Man's first-ever WT20I against Norway in Almería, Spain, on 12 November 2022. She took 2/2 in her four overs then scored 16 not out as her team successfully chased a target of 47 in just 4.3 overs to win by 10 wickets. The match was part of the 2022 Spain Women's Pentangular Series also involving the host nation, Italy and Sweden. Barnett compiled her maiden WT20I half-century - and the first by an Isle of Man player - in the game against Italy, finishing with 64 from 64 balls to again take player of the match honours although this time in a losing effort.

She made the highest score of her international career to date when she smashed 65 from 48 balls in the first of a three-match bilateral series with Austria on 30 July 2023.

The next month, Barnett was named player of the tournament as the Isle of Man won the 2023 Women's T20 Continental Cup in Romania. Across her team's four matches, she registered a total of 173 runs without being dismissed including a knock of 42 not out in the final against Greece. As well as her success with the bat, she took six wickets and two catches along with effecting a run-out during the four-team competition which also featured Romania and Malta.

In October 2023, Barnett was announced as one of 19 players selected to be part of the Emerging Players Programme at English professional club Central Sparks for the 2024 season.

Barnett captained the Isle of Man for the first time on 5 May 2024, in a three-match bilateral series with Guernsey held in Winchester, Hampshire, England, marking the occasion by taking three wickets.

In August 2024, she was leading run scorer as Isle of Man whitewashed Malta in a three-match bilateral series at Marsa Sports Club, Marsa, Malta, scoring 51 runs across two innings including 35 off 30 balls in the opening match.

Later that month at the same venue and against the same opposition in the first match of the Valletta Cup, Barnett scored an unbeaten 31 off 25 balls to steer her team to a nine-wicket victory. In her side's third match of the tournament she made 88 off 50 balls including 15 4s against Serbia before retiring due to illness. She followed that up in their next contest by hitting 96 off 62 balls including 12 4s and four 6s against Greece. Barnett then scored 67 off 34 balls with 11 4s in the tournament final against the Greeks as the Isle of Man won by seven wickets and she was named both player of the match and overall tournament having made a total of 282 runs across the event.

In April 2025, Barnett won both the best batter and player of the tournament awards as the Isle of Man finished runners-up at the Cyprus WT20I Quadrangular Series, which also featured the hosts, Denmark and Jersey. She scored 272 runs, including three half-centuries, and took five wickets across her team's six matches. During the tournament she became the fastest and youngest player to reach 1,000 WT20I runs, doing so in 26 innings at the age of 18 years and 196 days.

The following month, Barnett was named in the first Isle of Man squad to take part in a Women's T20 World Cup event at the 2025 Europe Qualifier Division Two in Rome. She made a match-winning 79, including 10 4s and two 6s, against Sweden in the team's second fixture. Barnett also compiled a half-century in their final match of the tournament, scoring 54 off 47 balls with seven 4s and one 6, in a defeat to Germany.

On 15 June 2025, Barnett made her debut for English county team Herefordshire in a T20 double-header against Shropshire. She top scored for her side with 14 off 11 balls in the first match, before making 86 from 60 balls, which included 15 4s, in the second game.

At the Women's ICC T20 Tri-Series in Leeds on 2 September 2025, she scored 48 off 31 balls as Isle of Man successfully chased 116 to record their first win over Jersey.

Barnett was picked to be part of a European squad to play against the Marylebone Cricket Club at Lord's on 17 April 2026, and at Wormsley Cricket Ground the next day. She scored 47 in the first match and 52 not out in the second as Europe swept the series.

Back on Isle of Man duty, on 26 August 2026 at the Women's T20 Continental Cup in Romania, Barnett made 71 not out off 43 balls in her team's opening group match win against the hosts. Three days later, she became the first player from her country to score a WT20I century when she compiled 123 not out from 64 balls, including hitting 16 4s and four 6s, in their third group match against Norway. In the following day's final, Barnett made 59 off 34 balls in a losing effort against Turkey. She finished the tournament with 257 runs, scored at an average of 128 and a strike rate of 178, which earned her the event's most valuable player award.

Barnett was named ICC Women's Player of the Month for August 2026, becoming the first player, male or female, from the Isle of Man to win one of the organisation's monthly accloades.
