= Cricket in Argentina =

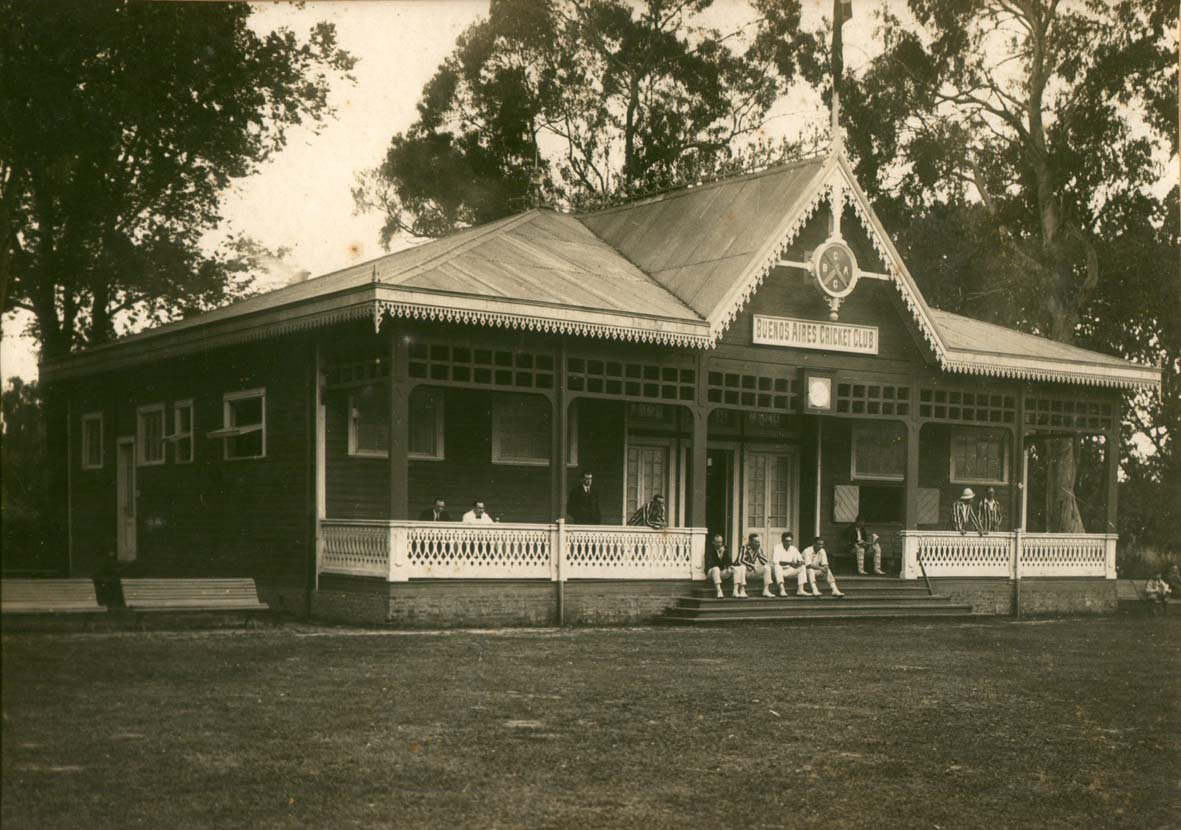
- The Buenos Aires Cricket Club in 1868. It is the oldest club still in existence in Argentina.
- Country: Argentina
- National team: Argentina

International competitions
- Cricket World Cup; ICC World Twenty20; ICC Champions Trophy; Women's Cricket World Cup; Under-19 Cricket World Cup

Argentina is the strongest cricket country in South America, only second to Guyana who represent the West Indies.

== History ==
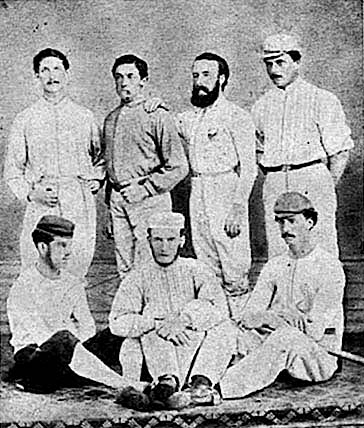
Buenos Aires Cricket Club team of 1867

The first time cricket was practised in the country was during the British invasions of the Río de la Plata in 1806 and 1807. It is believed that the first cricket match was played in San Antonio de Areco by a group of British prisoners that had been caught by the criollos revolutionaries.

By 1831 Argentina was the country with the greatest number of British immigrants behind the Commonwealth nations. Most of them were traders or bankers who had developed their business in the Río de la Plata area. One of those businessmen was James Brittain, who owned a country house in the neighborhood of Barracas, where he organized cricket games. Brittain was also the founder of Banco de Buenos Aires, the first bank of Argentina, established during the presidency of Bernardino Rivadavia.

During one of the frequent matches at Brittain's country house, it was decided to form a club. On November 5, 1831, a cricket game was played in Recoleta, Buenos Aires, near the Nuestra Señora del Pilar church. During that game, a flag with the legend "Buenos Aires Cricket Club" was displayed. Some historians affirm that was the current Buenos Aires Cricket & Rugby Club, which would later set its foundation on 1864 although it is believed the club was established at least 30 years before.

The first president of the BACC was British consul Frank Parish, named in 1858. In April 1868, BACC played its first club match facing Montevideo Cricket Club (MVCC) in the city of Montevideo. BACC won by 156-124. The rematch was played in Buenos Aires in 1869, where BACC defeated Montevideo again by 174-121. That same year a new club was formed, "Great Southern Railway Cricket Club", established by the English workers of Great Southern Railway. The club settled its field near to Barracas (current Avellaneda) railway station, moving in 1880 to Sola station. The president of GSRCC was Edward Banfield, who was also general manager of the railway company.

The BACC had moved to Palermo in 1864, where the club would remain until 1948 when a fire destroyed its buildings. Due to the yellow fever epidemic that devastated Buenos Aires in 1870, much of the British residents in the city moved to suburban areas, such as Flores (that was not part of the city of Buenos Aires by then), Lomas de Zamora, and Quilmes among other districts. In those areas other cricket clubs, such as Chascomús Cricket Club and Adela Cricket Club, were formed.

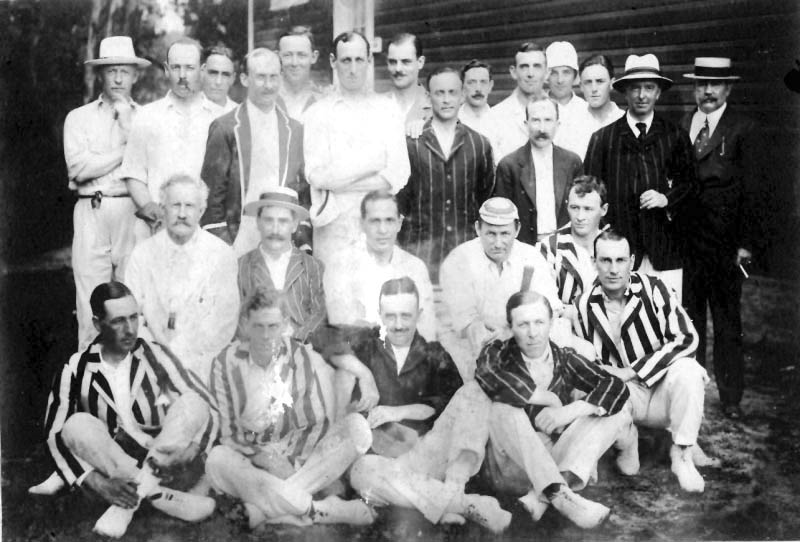
Buenos Aires and Rosario C.C. players posing together during a cricket match, 1916

In Lomas de Zamora, the Lomas Cricket Club (not to be confused with Lomas Athletic Club) was established in 1872, the same than Flores Cricket Club in Flores. In 1873 a third game between BACC and MVCC was played, ending in a tie.

In the rest of Argentina more cricket institutions were founded, being Córdoba, Rosario, Lomas de Zamora, Quilmes and Flores some of the most important centres for the practise of the sport. All of those clubs were exclusively for members of the British community, who contributed to keep the institutions active.

In BACC, the field was used for cricket during summer, and for the rest of the year it was rented for association football, rugby union and athletics. Those sports were played informally so they were not ruled by then. In 1875, the Parque 3 de Febrero was opened and the government of Argentina allowed BACC to keep its location in those land. As a retribution, the club named former president Domingo Sarmiento honorary member. In 1877 the BACC played its first match against Rosario Cricket Club. That same year, "Caballito College Cricket Club" was the first cricket institution founded entirely by Argentine natives ("criollos").

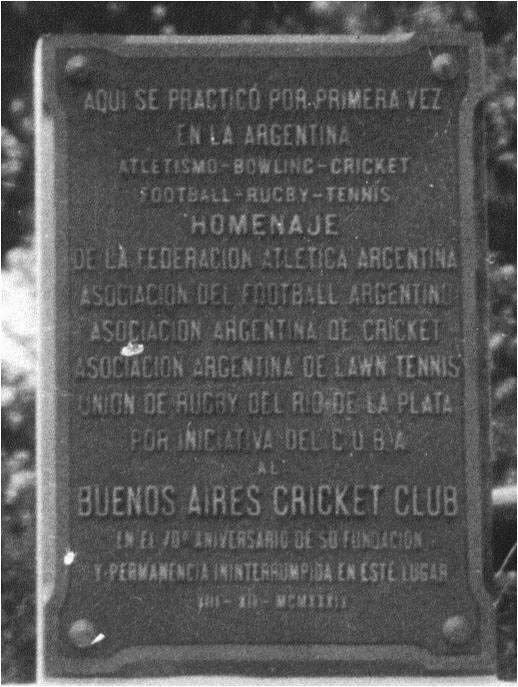
Plaque commemorating the 70th. anniversary of BACC (1934)

By 1878 Lomas CC and Flores CC had disappeared, only BACC remaining in Buenos Aires. The club organized matches played by members of the club on both sides, due to the lack of rivals from other institutions.

The first official competition was organized in 1897, being Lomas the champion. This was the first step to the creation of a national body, which would be finally established in 1913 with the name of "Asociación de Cricket Argentino".

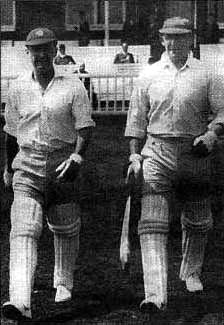
Two players of Lomas, 1948-49 champions

The decade of the 1940s is considered the golden age of the sport in Argentina due to the arrive of professional English players contributed to improve the level of the local championship, being even compared with the English cricket. When World War II began, most of the British players joined the British Army, leaving Argentina. This caused the level of the game to decrease.

Argentine cricket celebrated its 200th anniversary on 21 October 2006. An event was held at San Antonio College, where the first recorded match was played back in 1806 by British Soldiers. The history of cricket in the country can roughly be divided into various phases. From 1806 to 1900, cricket was established in Argentina, with the first international matches played, the major clubs founded, and the great North v South contest beginning. The Buenos Aires Cricket Club in Palermo was inaugurated in 1864 and is the historical reference for cricket in the country. Now known as the Buenos Aires Cricket & Rugby Club, a project is in place where cricket will once again hopefully become a practiced sport at this famous club.

Argentina first played international cricket in 1868, against Uruguay. It was the first official contest in any sport between the two countries. International competition against Brazil dates back to 1888, and against Chile to 1893, this encounter famous for the Argentine team taking three and a half days to reach Santiago in Chile, crossing the Andes by mule. In 1891, the famous annual three-day North v South fixture was played for the very first time and is still today a highlight of the domestic calendar. The first league competition was held in 1897.

The Argentine Cricket Association was founded in 1913 and celebrated its centenary in 2013. 1900 to 1939 are considered the golden years where cricket reached a high standard, many players reaching English county level. Argentina played first-class matches between 1911 and 1938. The sport went into decline after World War II, until Argentina became an Associate Member of the ICC in 1974 and took part in its first ICC Trophy in 1979.

With the introduction of the ICC Development Programme in 1997 to the present day, there has been a steady recovery with the ACA formulating a domestic development programme with the regional support of ICC Americas. Although cricket remains a minority sport within the sporting and primarily football culture of the country, Argentina still holds a competitive record at the international level, and performances over the last few years have earned respect and recognition from the rest of the cricket world.

== Competition ==
=== International ===
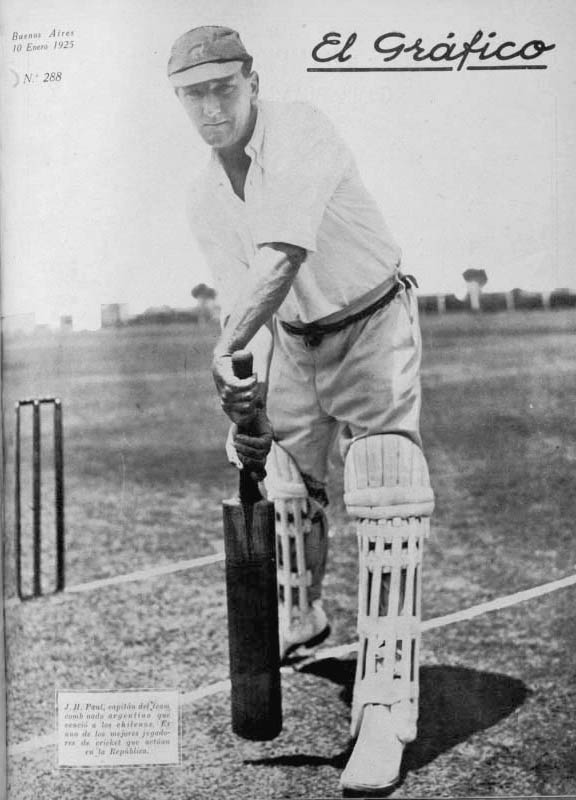
J.H. Paul, captain of the national team in 1925

Argentina played its first international cricket match against Uruguay in 1868. The performance at the 2001 ICC Trophy in Canada ensured the world took note of Argentina's cricket potential, especially a victory over Malaysia. The team's success at the Pepsi ICC World Cricket League Division 3 in Darwin, Australia in 2007 helped this relatively unknown team gain notice. Although results have not been as positive since then, in the higher reaches of Associate cricket – including a relegation campaign when hosting World Cricket League Division 3 in 2009 - Argentina has been a leading cricket nation in Latin America. Prior to the WCL Division 3 Series success of 2007, the Argentina national cricket team won the ICC Americas Division 2 Tournament in 2006. Argentina and Argentina "A" teams have traditionally been a force at South American Championships and maintained its status in the top-flight of a tough Americas Division One section (which features Canada and USA) during the tournament that took place from 27 May – 7 June 2010 in Bermuda.

=== Domestic ===
The domestic competition in Argentina runs from late October to early April every year. The first part of the year is dedicated to the schools leagues and festivals. Senior cricket consists of the Development Cup, Third Division Championship, Second Division Championship and Saturday Championship (played by Second Division teams) for lower leagues, while at premier league level there is the Robin Stuart Shield, a Twenty20 league and the First Division Championship. A Women's First Division Championship was played for the first time in 2008. The junior leagues are played by schools and clubs, at U15 and U19 levels, and for the first time U13 leagues were played over the winter in 2008. An U11 league will begin in the winter of 2009. The annual North v South three-day match is a domestic highlight and was played for the 110th time in March 2009. Argentina also receives a number of visiting teams on an annual basis, who compete against local clubs, schools and representative teams.

=== Development Programme ===
Argentina's development programme looks to give opportunities and competition to every age group in the country, both domestically and internationally. On the domestic scene, Argentina has an U15 league and an U19 league. There is also the Development Cup and Third Division, which is largely made up of junior players. The winter months include U13 and U11 leagues for boys and girls. Argentina also has an annual international competition called the Pampero Festival in which our U17s compete against teams from South Africa, Australia and England. There are also an annual U15 series against Chile, while the first South American U13 championship took place in 2009.

Education and awareness is an important component, and coaching, umpiring and scoring courses are held in clubs and schools on a regular basis. There are also annual academies held in school vacations for various age groups targeting the most talented juniors in the local game. The ACA is also aware of its social responsibility, and a number of projects are taking place in underprivileged areas, giving young children the opportunity to play cricket.

=== Women's cricket ===
The roots of Argentine women's cricket go back to an U15 girls tour to New Zealand in 2000, and today there is a Women's First Division competition as a direct result of that. Argentina proudly took part in the first-ever Americas Women's Championship in 2007 and have played home and away T20 series against the emerging Brazil team. In 2009, Argentina took part in the second Americas Women's Championship, as well as sending a development team to Chile to assist the growth of women's cricket there. In addition to the local first Division, the women's national team, known as the Flamingos, take part in the men's senior Second Division tournament. Junior girls leagues with schools and clubs are scheduled to begin in 2009.

== List of champions ==
=== Primera División ===
The following is a list of the Primera División champions:

Ed.	Season	Champion/s
1	1897–98	Lomas (1)
–	1898–99	(No competition held)
2	1899–00	Lomas (2)
3	1900–01	Hurlingham (1)
4	1901–02	Lomas (3)
5	1902–03	Belgrano (1)
6	1903–04	Hurlingham (2)
7	1904–05	Buenos Aires (1)
8	1905–06	Belgrano (2)
9	1906–07	Belgrano (3)
10	1907-08	Belgrano (4)
11	1908-09	Belgrano (5)
12	1909-10	Belgrano (6) / Hurlingham (3) (Note: Title shared.)
13	1910-11	Belgrano (7)
14	1911-12	Belgrano (8)
15	1912-13	Hurlingham (4)
16	1913-14	Hurlingham (5)
17	1914-15	Belgrano (9)
–	1915–17	(No competition held due to World War I)
18	1917-18	Lomas (4)
19	1918-19	Belgrano (10)
20	1919-20	Buenos Aires (2)
21	1920-21	Hurlingham (6)
22	1921-22	Hurlingham (7)
23	1922-23	Lomas (5)
24	1923-24	Belgrano (11)
25	1924-25	Buenos Aires (3)
26	1925-26	Belgrano (12)
27	1926-27	Belgrano (13)
28	1927-28	Buenos Aires (4)
29	1928-29	Belgrano (14)
30	1929-30	Belgrano (15)
31	1930-31	Buenos Aires (5)
32	1931-32	Belgrano (16)
33	1932-33	Belgrano (17)
34	1933-34	San Isidro (1)
35	1934-35	Hurlingham (8)
36	1935-36	San Isidro (2)
37	1936-37	San Isidro (3)
38	1937-38	San Isidro (4)
39	1938-39	Buenos Aires (6)
40	1939-40	Buenos Aires (7)
41	1940-41	Buenos Aires (8)
42	1941-42	Buenos Aires (9)
–	1942-46	(No competition held due to World War II)
43	1946-47	San Isidro (5)
44	1947-48	Lomas (6)
45	1948-49	Lomas (7)
46	1949-50	Buenos Aires (10)
47	1950-51	San Isidro (6)
48	1951-52	Lomas (8)
49	1952-53	Buenos Aires (11)
50	1953-54	Belgrano (18)
51	1954-55	Belgrano (19)
52	1955-56	Belgrano (20)
53	1956-57	Buenos Aires (12)
54	1957-58	Buenos Aires (13)
55	1958-59	Belgrano "B" (21)
56	1959-60	San Isidro (7)
57	1960-61	San Isidro (8)
58	1961-62	Belgrano (22)
59	1962-63	Lomas (9)
60	1963-64	Buenos Aires (14)
61	1964-65	Lomas (10)
62	1965-66	Belgrano (23)
63	1966-67	Buenos Aires (15)
64	1967-68	Belgrano (24)
65	1968-69	Belgrano (25)
66	1969-70	Belgrano "B" (26)
67	1970-71	Belgrano (27)
68	1971-72	Buenos Aires (16)
69	1972-73	Lomas (11)
70	1973-74	Belgrano (28)
71	1974-75	Belgrano (29)
72	1975-76	Buenos Aires (17)
73	1976-77	Buenos Aires (18)
74	1977-78	Lomas (12)
75	1978-79	Lomas (13)
76	1979-80	Lomas (14)
77	1980-81	Belgrano (30)
78	1981-82	Belgrano (31)
79	1982-83	Hurlingham (9)
80	1983-84	Belgrano (32)
81	1984-85	Belgrano (33)
82	1985-86	Hurlingham "B" (10)
83	1986-87	Hurlingham "B" (11)
84	1987-88	Hurlingham "B" (12)
85	1988-89	Belgrano (34)
86	1989-90	Belgrano (35)
87	1990-91	Lomas (15)
88	1991-92	Belgrano (36)
89	1992-93	San Albano (1)
90	1993-94	Hurlingham (13)
91	1994-95	Lomas (16)
92	1995-96	San Albano (2)
93	1996-97	Hurlingham (14)
94	1997-98	Belgrano (37)
95	1998-99	San Albano (3)
96	1999-2000	San Albano (4)
97	2000-01	Lomas (17)
98	2001-02	Belgrano (38)
99	2002-03	Lomas (18)
100	2003-04	Lomas (19)
101	2004-05	San Albano (5)
102	2005-06	Belgrano (39)
103	2006-07	San Albano (6)
104	2007-08	Hurlingham (15)
105	2008-09	San Albano (7)
106	2009-10	Lomas (20)
107	2010–11	Belgrano (40)
108	2011–12	San Albano (8)
109	2012–13	Lomas (21)
110	2013–14	Belgrano (41)
111	2014–15	Lomas (22)
112	2015–16	San Albano (9)
113	2016–17	Belgrano (42)
114	2017–18	San Albano (10)
115	2018–19	San Albano (11)
116	2019–20	Belgrano (43)
–	2020–21	(Not held due to Covid-19 pandemic)
117	2021–22	Belgrano (45)
118	2022–23	Belgrano Lions (Note: team from Belgrano A.C.) (1)
119	2023– 24	Belgrano Lions (2)

== See also ==
- Argentina national cricket team
