= 2019 ICC Awards =

Annual Award from International Cricket Council

- Date: 15 January 2020
- Presented by: ICC

Highlights
- Cricketer of the Year: Men's: (England) Ben Stokes; Women's: (Australia) Ellyse Perry
- Men's Test Player of the Year: (Australia) Pat Cummins
- ODI Player of the Year: Men's: (India) Rohit Sharma; Women's: (Australia) Ellyse Perry
- Women's T20I Player of the Year: (Australia) Alyssa Healy
- Emerging Player of the Year: Men's: (Australia) Marnus Labuschagne; Women's: (Thailand) Chanida Sutthiruang
- Website: www.icc-cricket.com

The 2019 ICC Awards were the sixteenth edition of ICC Awards. The voting panel took into account players' performance between 1 January 2019 and 31 December 2019. The announcement of the ICC World XI Teams, along with the winners of the men's individual ICC awards, was made on 15 January 2020. The women's awards were announced on 17 December 2019, with Ellyse Perry winning the Rachael Heyhoe Flint Award as the Women's Cricketer of the Year.

== Award categories and winners ==
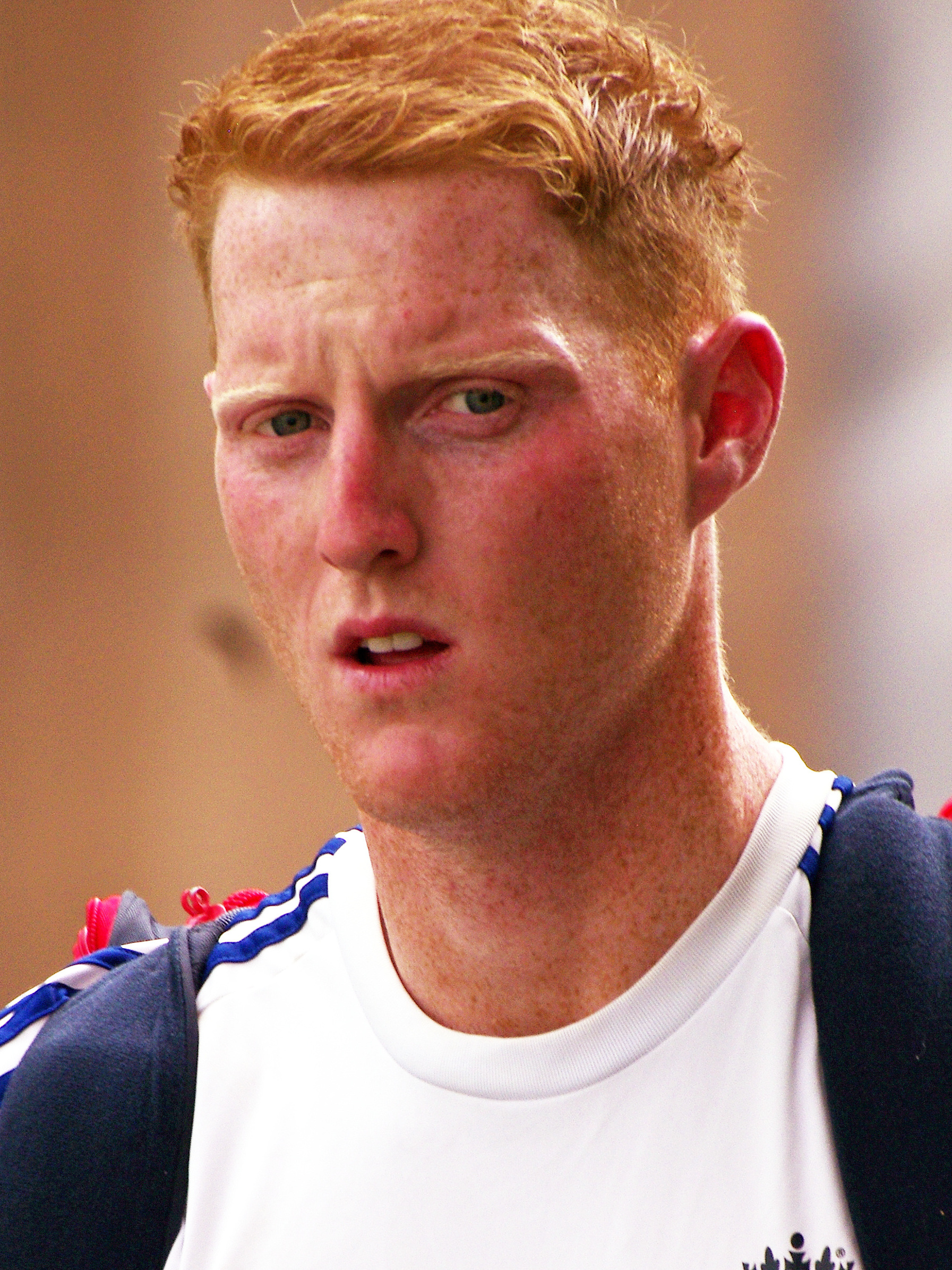
Ben Stokes

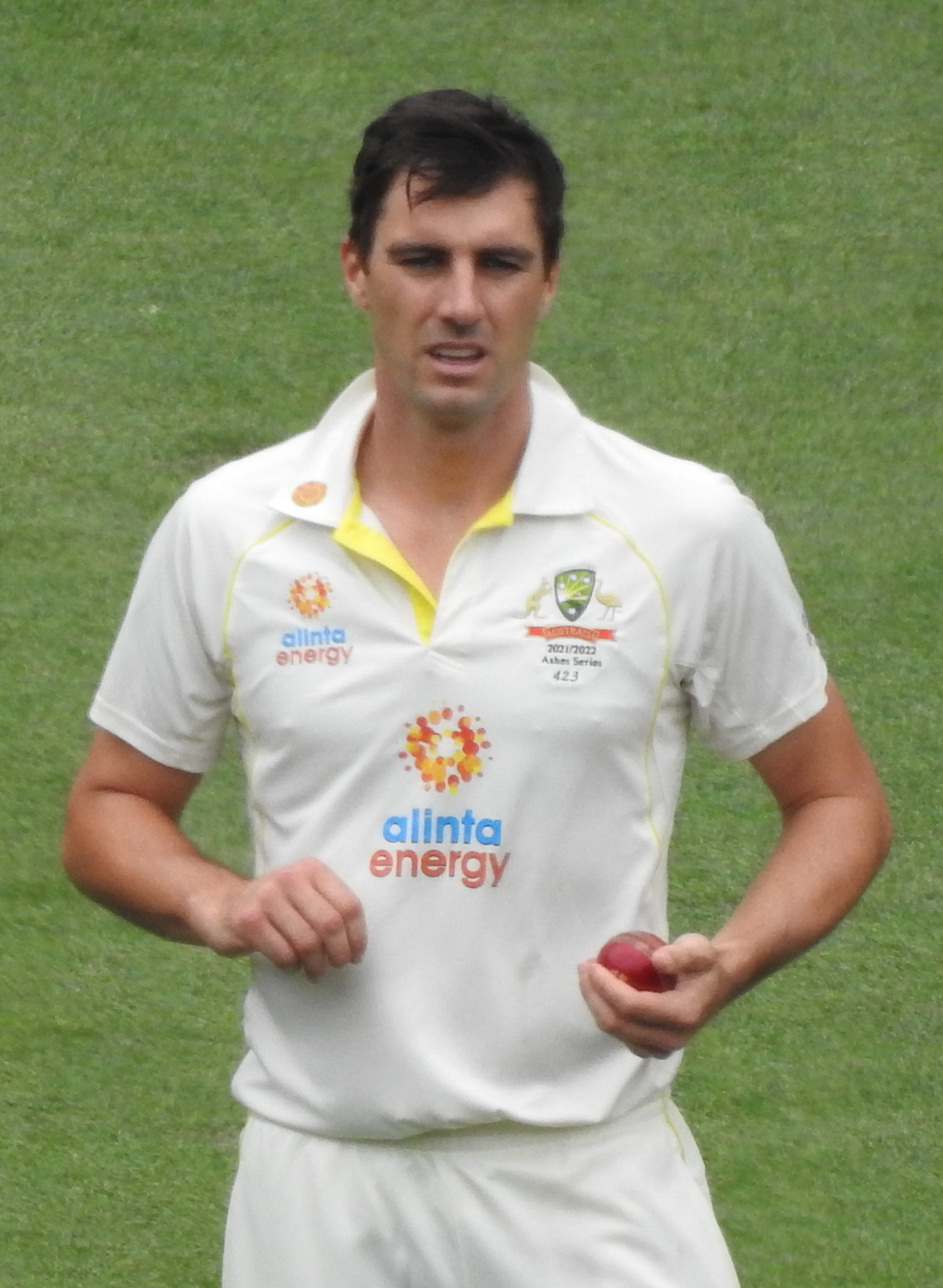
Pat Cummins

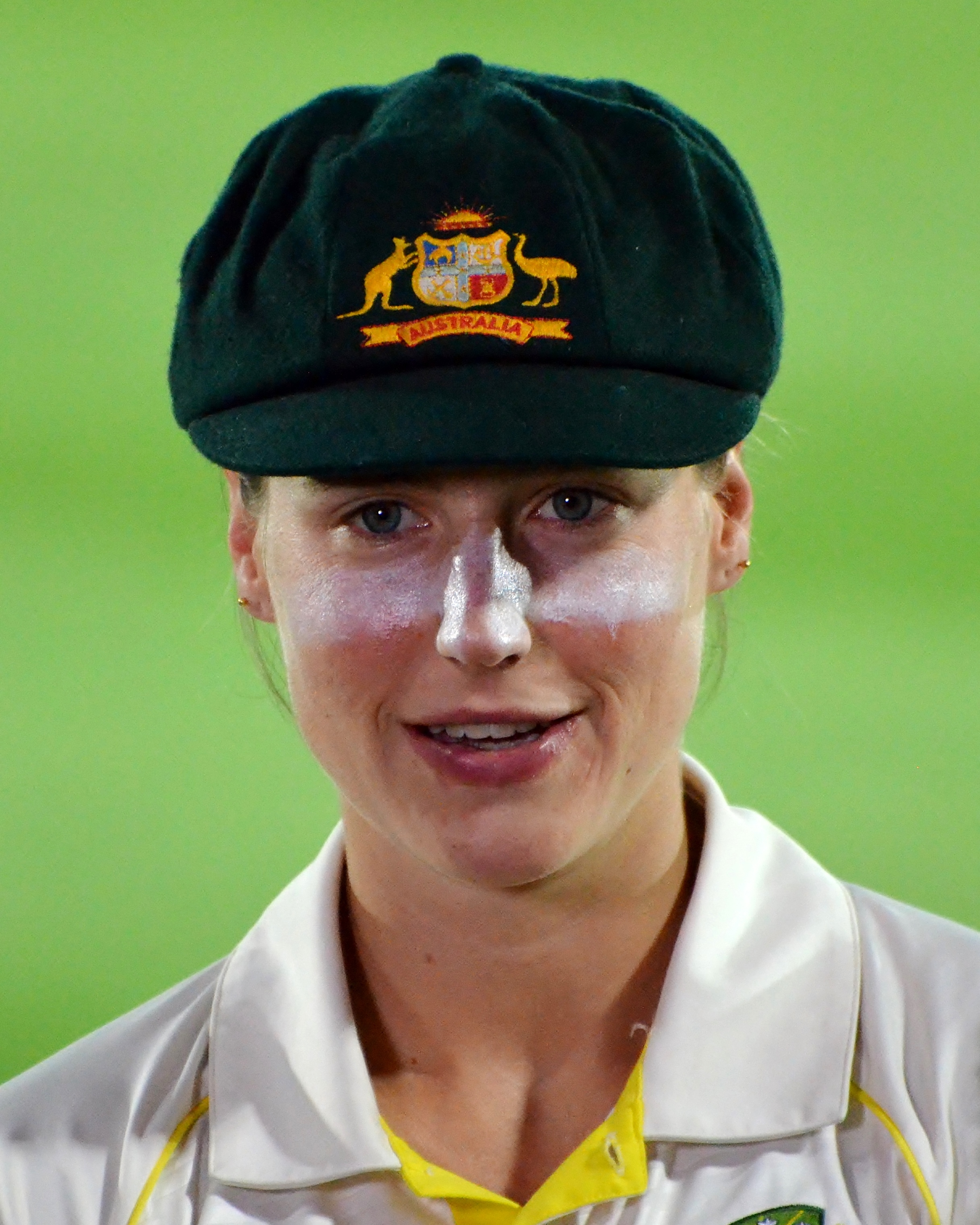
Ellyse Perry

=== Individual awards ===
==== Men's awards ====
Men's Cricketer of the Year: (England) Ben Stokes	Men's Test Player of the Year: (Australia) Pat Cummins
Men's ODI Player of the Year: (India) Rohit Sharma	Men's Emerging Player of the Year: (Australia) Marnus Labuschagne
Men's Associate Player of the Year: (Scotland) Kyle Coetzer

==== Women's awards ====
Women's Cricketer of the Year: (Australia) Ellyse Perry	Women's ODI Player of the Year: (Australia) Ellyse Perry
Women's T20I Player of the Year: (Australia) Alyssa Healy	Women's Emerging Player of the Year: (Thailand) Chanida Sutthiruang

==== Other awards ====
Umpire of the Year
- (England) Richard Illingworth
Twenty20 International Performance of the Year
- (India) Deepak Chahar, for taking 6/7 from 3.2 overs against Bangladesh at Vidarbha Cricket Association Stadium in Nagpur on 10 November 2019
Spirit of Cricket
- (India) Virat Kohli, for the incident in which he asked fans not to boo Steve Smith of Australia on 9 June 2019

=== ICC Teams of the Year ===
==== Men's teams ====
ICC Men's Test Team of the Year

ICC Men's Test Team of the Year
Batting position	Player	Team	Role
Opener	Mayank Agarwal	India	Batsman
Opener	Tom Latham	New Zealand	Batsman
Number 3	Marnus Labuschagne	Australia	Batsman
Number 4	Virat Kohli	India	Batsman / Captain
Number 5	Steve Smith	Australia	Batsman
Number 6	Ben Stokes	England	All-rounder
Number 7	BJ Watling	New Zealand	Batsman / Wicket-keeper
Number 8	Pat Cummins	Australia	Bowler
Number 9	Mitchell Starc	Australia	Bowler
Number 10	Neil Wagner	New Zealand	Bowler
Number 11	Nathan Lyon	Australia	Bowler

ICC Men's ODI Team of the Year

ICC Men's ODI Team of the Year
Batting position	Player	Team	Role
Opener	Rohit Sharma	India	Batsman
Opener	Shai Hope	West Indies	Batsman
Number 3	Virat Kohli	India	Batsman / Captain
Number 4	Babar Azam	Pakistan	Batsman
Number 5	Kane Williamson	New Zealand	Batsman
Number 6	Ben Stokes	England	All-rounder
Number 7	Jos Buttler	England	Batsman / Wicket-keeper
Number 8	Mitchell Starc	Australia	Bowler
Number 9	Trent Boult	New Zealand	Bowler
Number 10	Mohammed Shami	India	Bowler
Number 11	Kuldeep Yadav	India	Bowler

==== Women's teams ====
ICC Women’s ODI Team of the Year

ICC Women's ODI Team of the Year
Batting position	Player	Team	Role
Opener	Alyssa Healy	Australia	Batsman / Wicket-keeper
Opener	Smriti Mandhana	India	Batsman
Number 3	Tammy Beaumont	England	Batsman
Number 4	Meg Lanning	Australia	Batsman / Captain
Number 5	Stafanie Taylor	West Indies	All-rounder
Number 6	Ellyse Perry	Australia	All-rounder
Number 7	Jess Jonassen	Australia	All-rounder
Number 8	Shikha Pandey	India	Bowler
Number 9	Jhulan Goswami	India	Bowler
Number 10	Megan Schutt	Australia	Bowler
Number 11	Poonam Yadav	West Indies	Bowler

ICC Women’s T20I Team of the Year

ICC Women's T20I Team of the Year
Batting position	Player	Team	Role
Opener	Alyssa Healy	Australia	Batsman / Wicket-keeper
Opener	Danielle Wyatt	England	Batsman
Number 3	Meg Lanning	Australia	Batsman / Captain
Number 4	Smriti Mandhana	India	Batsman
Number 5	Lizelle Lee	South Africa	Batsman
Number 6	Ellyse Perry	Australia	All-rounder
Number 7	Deepti Sharma	India	All-rounder
Number 8	Nida Dar	Pakistan	Bowler
Number 9	Megan Schutt	Australia	Bowler
Number 10	Shabnim Ismail	South Africa	Bowler
Number 11	Radha Yadav	West Indies	Bowler

== See also ==
- International Cricket Council
- ICC Awards
- Sir Garfield Sobers Trophy (Cricketer of the Year)
- ICC Test Player of the Year
- ICC ODI Player of the Year
- David Shepherd Trophy (Umpire of the Year)
- ICC Women's Cricketer of the Year
- ICC Test Team of the Year
- ICC ODI Team of the Year
