= Cricket in Saudi Arabia =

Cricket in Saudi Arabia is a sport growing in popularity. Saudi Arabia's playing season runs from October to April. There are 149 cricket clubs and a single turf wicket in Saudi Arabia.

== History ==
Cricket was first referenced in Saudi Arabia in 1960 and was contested by Parish teams. By the 1970s the game became structured and more organised, with associations formed. The game was mostly played by expatriates in its early days and this remains the case today, with the majority of players coming from the Indian subcontinent, England, Australia, South Africa and New Zealand.

In 2001, legal status to organize the game of cricket was attained under the royal patronage of Princess Ghada bint Homoud bin Abdulaziz Al-Saud. In 2003, Saudi Arabia became the affiliate member of the International Cricket Council. The team has never taken part in an exclusive International Cricket Council tournament, but has played in Asian Cricket Council competitions, most notably the ACC Trophies and the ACC Twenty20 Cups. It was in the 2008 ACC Trophy Elite that they defeated the UAE, a country with One Day International experience.

== Governing body ==
Saudi Cricket Centre is the official governing body of cricket in Saudi Arabia. Its current headquarters is in Jeddah. became an Affiliate Member of the International Cricket Council in 2003, and became the 39th Associate Member in 2016.

== Domestic competitions ==
Saudi Arabia's domestic setup involves 11 regional cricket association who play one-day and Twenty20 cricket from October to April. The 2010 competition was won by Western Province Cricket Association.

=== Regional Associations ===
List below are the current 11 city cricket associations that make up Saudi Cricket Centre:

- Western Province Cricket Association
- Jeddah Cricket Association
- Riyadh Cricket Association
- Riyadh Cricket League
- Eastern Province Cricket Association
- Yanbu Al Sinayiah Cricket Association
- Aseer Cricket League
- Jizan Premier Cricket League
- Jizan Region Cricket Association
- Madina Cricket League
- Madina Cricket Association

== Grounds ==
There are currently 60 cricket grounds in Saudi Arabia. All of these grounds are exclusively prepared for cricket with concrete based permanent pitches on a barren outfield. Only one ground, in Yanbu, includes a green outfield, a clubhouse, lights, dressing rooms, toilets and other facilities.

== National team ==
The Saudi Arabia national cricket team represents the country in international cricket matches. The national team, formed in 2003, They play in the Challenge division of the ACC Trophy, having previously played in the Elite division prior to relegation in 2008, before that the ACC Trophy before it was split into two divisions. The team has also played in the ACC Twenty20 Cup and the Middle East Cup.

== See also ==
- Sport in Saudi Arabia
