= 2022 Spain Women's Pentangular Series =

International cricket tournament

- Dates: 11 – 14 November 2022
- Administrator: Cricket España
- Cricket format: Women's Twenty20 International
- Tournament format: Round-robin
- Host: Spain
- Champions: Italy
- Runners-up: Spain
- Participants: 5
- Matches: 10
- Player of the series: (Spain) Naomi Hillman-Bermejo
- Most runs: (Spain) Naomi Hillman-Bermejo (152)
- Most wickets: (Italy) Kumudu Peddrick (9)

The 2022 Spain Women's Pentangular Series was a women's Twenty20 International (WT20I) cricket tournament held in Spain from 11 to 14 November 2022. The participants were the women's national sides of Spain, Italy, Norway, Sweden and Isle of Man. The Isle of Man played their first official WT20I matches in the tournament.

== Squads ==
Isle of Man	Italy	Norway	Spain	Sweden
Clare Crowe (c); Lucy Barnett; Kira Buchan; Kim Carney; Ellan Cleator; Rebecca Corkish; Joanne Hicks; Andrea Littlejohns; Finnola Martin; Danielle Murphy; Rachel Overman; Catherine Perry (wk); Jasmin Pullen (wk); Alanya Thorpe; Rebecca Webster (wk)	Kumudu Peddrick (c); Emilia Bartram; Gayathri Batagoda; Nimesha Ekanayake; Sewmini Kanankege; Kirandeep Kaur; Anusha Landage; Chathurika Mahamalage; Sadalee Malwatta; Dilaisha Nanayakkara; Methnara Rathnayake (wk); Dishani Samarawickrama; Sonia Toffoletto; Anne Warnakulasuriya; Sharon Withanage (wk)	Farial Zia Safdar (c); Mahnoor Akram; Ayesha Hasan; Hina Hussain; Misbah Ifzal; Saira Ifzal; Ramya Immadi; Raksha Jangir; Bijeyata Kumari (wk); Pooja Kumari; Sagana Kunaratnum; Lopamudra; Ananya Rautela; Mirab Razwan; Farima Safi	Elspeth Fowler (c); Amy Brown-Carrera; Hifsa Butt; Payal Chilongia; Naomi Hillman-Bermejo; Rabia Iqbal; Zenab Iqbal; Jaspreet Kaur; Wania Malik; Tashiba Mirza (wk); Rabia Mushtaq; Muskan Naseeb; Uswa Syed	Gunjan Shukla (c); Meghana Alugunoolla (wk); Eman Asim; Sofie Elmesioo; Imali Jayasooriya; Sienna Linden; Signe Lundell (wk); Kanchan Rana; Surya Ravuri; Abhilasha Singh; Rashmi Somashekhar; Elsa Thelander; Anya Vaidya

== Points table ==
Pos	Team	Pld	W	L	NR	Pts	NRR
1	Italy	4	4	0	0	8	4.004
2	Spain	4	3	1	0	6	−0.052
3	Sweden	4	2	2	0	4	0.180
4	Isle of Man	4	1	3	0	2	−0.676
5	Norway	4	0	4	0	0	−3.848

Source: ESPNcricinfo

== Fixtures ==
11 November 2022
09:00
Scorecard

Spain	v	Italy

Match abandoned
Desert Springs Cricket Ground, Almería
Umpires: Gordon Ashford (Esp) and Nilkesh Patel (Esp)

- No toss.
- No play was possible due to a wet outfield.
- The match was rescheduled for 14 November.

11 November 2022
12:00
Scorecard

Isle of Man	v	Sweden

Match abandoned
Desert Springs Cricket Ground, Almería
Umpires: Mark Chappell (Esp) and Nilkesh Patel (Esp)

- No toss.
- No play was possible due to a wet outfield.
- The match was rescheduled for 14 November.

11 November 2022
15:00
Scorecard

Italy; 146/4 (20 overs)	v	Norway; 36 (17.4 overs)
Dilaisha Nanayakkara 33 (31); Pooja Kumari 2/23 (4 overs)		Ramya Immadi 9 (22); Kumudu Peddrick 3/8 (3.4 overs)

Italy won by 110 runs
Desert Springs Cricket Ground, Almería
Umpires: Gordon Ashford (Esp) and Nilkesh Patel (Esp)
Player of the match: Dilaisha Nanayakkara (Ita)

- Italy won the toss and elected to bat.
- Emilia Bartram, Anne Warnakulasuriya (Ita), Bijeyata Kumari, Sagana Kunaratnum, Lopamudra and Mirab Razwan (Nor) all made their WT20I debuts.

12 November 2022
09:00
Scorecard

Norway; 46 (17 overs)	v	Isle of Man; 49/0 (4.3 overs)
Sagana Kunaratnum 4* (39); Catherine Perry 3/13 (3 overs)		Kim Carney 24* (12)

Isle of Man won by 10 wickets
Desert Springs Cricket Ground, Almería
Umpires: Mark Chappell (Esp) and Nilkesh Patel (Esp)
Player of the match: Lucy Barnett (IoM)

- Isle of Man won the toss and elected to field.
- Lucy Barnett, Kim Carney, Ellan Cleator, Rebecca Corkish, Clare Crowe, Joanne Hicks, Danielle Murphy, Rachel Overman, Catherine Perry, Alanya Thorpe, Rebecca Webster (IoM) and Raksha Jangir (Nor) all made their WT20I debuts.

12 November 2022
12:00
Scorecard

Italy; 151/9 (20 overs)	v	Sweden; 79 (19.5 overs)
Chathurika Mahamalage 41 (51); Sienna Linden 2/33 (4 overs)		Eman Asim 12 (20); Kumudu Peddrick 2/2 (1.5 overs)

Italy won by 72 runs
Desert Springs Cricket Ground, Almería
Umpires: Mark Chappell (Esp) and Andrew Elliott (Eng)
Player of the match: Chathurika Mahamalage (Ita)

- Italy won the toss and elected to bat.
- Imali Jayasooriya (Swe) made her WT20I debut.

12 November 2022
15:00
Scorecard

Isle of Man; 132/7 (20 overs)	v	Spain; 121/3 (17 overs)
Ellan Cleator 36 (31); Payal Chilongia 2/8 (3 overs)		Naomi Hillman-Bermejo 41* (34); Lucy Barnett 1/7 (3 overs)

Spain won by 14 runs (DLS method)
Desert Springs Cricket Ground, Almería
Umpires: Mark Chappell (Esp) and Nilkesh Patel (Esp)
Player of the match: Naomi Hillman-Bermejo (Esp)

- Spain won the toss and elected to field.
- No further play was possible due to bad light.
- Naomi Hillman-Bermejo, Payal Chilongia (Esp), Kira Buchan, Andrea Littlejohns and Jasmin Pullen (IoM) all made their WT20I debuts.

13 November 2022
09:00
Scorecard

Spain; 115/7 (20 overs)	v	Norway; 80/8 (20 overs)
Naomi Hillman-Bermejo 43 (42); Hina Hussain 2/21 (4 overs); Farial Zia Safdar 2/21 (4 overs)		Ayesha Hasan 33 (47); Payal Chilongia 3/17 (4 overs)

Spain won by 35 runs
Desert Springs Cricket Ground, Almería
Umpires: Mark Chappell (Esp) and Nilkesh Patel (Esp)
Player of the match: Naomi Hillman-Bermejo (Esp)

- Norway won the toss and elected to field.
- Mahnoor Akram and Ananya Rautela (Nor) both made their WT20I debuts.

13 November 2022
12:00
Scorecard

Isle of Man; 102/8 (20 overs)	v	Italy; 105/4 (14.4 overs)
Lucy Barnett 64 (64); Sharon Withanage 3/5 (4 overs)		Kumudu Peddrick 27 (28); Alanya Thorpe 2/11 (3 overs)

Italy won by 6 wickets
Desert Springs Cricket Ground, Almería
Umpires: Mark Chappell (Esp) and Nilkesh Patel (Esp)
Player of the match: Lucy Barnett (IoM)

- Isle of Man won the toss and elected to bat.

13 November 2022
15:00
Scorecard

Sweden; 143/8 (20 overs)	v	Norway; 92/5 (20 overs)
Signe Lundell 26 (25); Ramya Immadi 3/22 (4 overs)		Ayesha Hasan 29 (49); Anya Vaidya 2/16 (3 overs)

Sweden won by 51 runs
Desert Springs Cricket Ground, Almería
Umpires: Mark Chappell (Esp) and Nilkesh Patel (Esp)
Player of the match: Ramya Immadi (Nor)

- Norway won the toss and elected to field.

14 November 2022
09:00
Scorecard

Spain; 124/6 (20 overs)	v	Sweden; 81 (16.5 overs)
Naomi Hillman-Bermejo 47* (42); Anya Vaidya 2/17 (3 overs)		Anya Vaidya 15 (19); Amy Brown-Carrera 2/9 (4 overs)

Spain won by 43 runs
Desert Springs Cricket Ground, Almería
Umpires: Mark Chappell (Esp) and Nilkesh Patel (Esp)
Player of the match: Naomi Hillman-Bermejo (Esp)

- Sweden won the toss and elected to field.

14 November 2022
12:00
Scorecard

Italy; 149/4 (20 overs)	v	Spain; 53/4 (20 overs)
Sharon Withanage 51 (56); Wania Malik 1/13 (2 overs)		Naomi Hillman-Bermejo 21* (34); Kumudu Peddrick 2/6 (3 overs)

Italy won by 96 runs
Desert Springs Cricket Ground, Almería
Umpires: Mark Chappell (Esp) and Nilkesh Patel (Esp)
Player of the match: Sharon Withanage (Ita)

- Italy won the toss and elected to bat.
- Rescheduled in place of the abandoned game on 11 November.

14 November 2022
15:00
Scorecard

Isle of Man; 27 (8 overs)	v	Sweden; 28/2 (4.5 overs)
Kira Buchan 9 (5); Gunjan Shukla 5/7 (3 overs)		Kanchan Rana 14 (15); Lucy Barnett 1/12 (2.5 overs)

Sweden won by 8 wickets
Desert Springs Cricket Ground, Almería
Umpires: Mark Chappell (Esp) and Andrew Elliott (Eng)
Player of the match: Gunjan Shukla (Swe)

- Sweden won the toss and elected to field.
- Elsa Thelander (Swe) made her WT20I debut.
- Gunjan Shukla became the first cricketer for Sweden to take a five-wicket haul in WT20Is.
- Rescheduled in place of the abandoned game on 11 November.
