= Saudi Arabian Cricket Federation =

Official governing body for cricket

Saudi Arabian Cricket Federation الاتحاد السعودي للكريكيت
- Sport: Cricket
- Jurisdiction: Cricket in Saudi Arabia
- Abbreviation: SACF
- Founded: 2001; 25 years ago
- Affiliation: International Cricket Council; Asian Cricket Council
- Affiliation date: 2003; 23 years ago 2016; 10 years ago
- Regional affiliation: Asian Cricket Council
- Affiliation date: 2003; 23 years ago
- Headquarters: Riyadh, Saudi Arabia
- Chairman: HRH Prince Saud Bin Mishal AlSaud

Official website
- sacf.gov.sa
- (Saudi Arabia)

Saudi Arabian Cricket Federation is the official governing body of the sport of cricket in Saudi Arabia. Its headquarters is currently based in Riyadh, Saudi Arabia. It is Saudi Arabia's representative at the International Cricket Council, and has been a member of the Council since 2003. It is also a member of the Asian Cricket Council.

Saudi Arabia became an affiliate member of the International Cricket Council in 2003, and became that body's 39th associate member in 2016.

== History of cricket in Saudi Arabia ==
The first references to cricket in Saudi Arabia was in 1960. Organised cricket was developed by the mid-1970s when associations were formed, and legal status to organise cricket events was attained in 2001. In 2003, Saudi Arabia obtained status as a country participating in international cricket events.

== Registered Cricket Associations Under SACF ==
- WPCA – Western Province Cricket Association
- RCA – Riyadh Cricket Association
- RCL - Riyadh Cricket League
- EPCA – Eastern Province Cricket Association
- ERCA - Eastern Region Cricket Association
- YACA – Yanbu Al Sinayiah Cricket Association
- MMCA - Madina Al Munawwara Cricket Association
- ACL - Aseer Cricket League
- NCL - Najran Cricket League
- JRCL - Jizan Region Cricket Association
- JPCL - Jizan Premier Cricket League
- AQCL - Al Qaseem Cricket League
- JCA - Jubail Cricket Association
- TCA - Tabuk Cricket Association
- JCA - Jeddah Cricket Association

== Facilities and Events ==
Saudi Arabia has:

- 120 registered cricket clubs, with over 7200 registered players
- 25 cricket grounds
- 2 cricket academies
- Excellence Cricket Academy in Jeddah
- One turf wicket
- 3 AstroTurf wickets
- 17 certified coaches
- 28 certified umpires
- One women's ACC-qualified umpire/scorer
- Various annual competitions
- 56 inter-club competitions (each association conducts its own competition)
- 8 inter-region open competitions
- One inter-country competition at association level
- Junior and youth leagues
- 12 inter-school competitions (U-13, U-15, U-17)
- 4 regional junior competitions (U-19–U-21)
- 8 coaches involved in regular coaching clinics
