= Vietnam Cricket Association =

- Sport: Cricket
- Jurisdiction: Vietnam
- Abbreviation: VCA
- Founded: 2006
- Sponsor: Suntory Pepsi
- (Vietnam)

The Vietnam Cricket Association (VCA) is the governing body for cricket in Vietnam.

It was established as the Saigon Cricket Association (SCA) in 2005 by expatriates in Vietnam. It was founded by Michael Mann and Laurie Hayward who procured the first astro pitch in Vietnam for cricket at the RMIT University Saigon South Campus grounds. The SCA was renamed as the Vietnam Cricket Association in 2009 and the organization began to process its formal applications for incorporation as well as its bid for Asian Cricket Council membership.

The first national cricket team of Vietnam made its international debut in the 29th southeast Asian Games (SEA Games 2017) in Malaysia.
