= Cricket Sierra Leone =

Governing body for cricket in Sierra Leone

- Sport: Cricket
- Founded: 1942
- Affiliation: International Cricket Council
- Affiliation date: c. 2001
- Regional affiliation: Africa
- Location: Freetown, Sierra Leone

Official website
- sierraleonecricket.com
- (Sierra Leone)

Cricket Sierra Leone (CSL), formerly known as the Sierra Leone Cricket Association (SLCA), is the official governing body of cricket in Sierra Leone. Its headquarters is currently located in Kingtom Cricket Oval. The association represents Sierra Leone at the International Cricket Council (ICC) and has been an associate member of the ICC since 2002. Additionally, it is a member of the African Cricket Association.

== History ==
The game of cricket was introduced to Sierra Leone by the British Royal Artillery forces, who introduced the sport in schools and other institutions. The Sierra Leone Grammar School and the Methodist Boys High School were the first schools in Freetown to embrace the sport. In the provinces, Bo government secondary school, founded in 1906, became the first school to play cricket. Sierra Leone played its first international matches against Gambia in 1935. West African inter-colonial tournaments were also held from the 1930s onwards, with Nigeria and Ghana eventually joined the tournament. This led to the transformation of the inter-colonial tournament into a four-sided West African tournament, which began in 1967 and was periodically held with breaks. In 2006, the tournament was replaced by the North Western Conference (NWACC).

In 2009, the Sierra Leone Under-19 cricket team qualified for the ICC U-19 World Cup 2010 qualifying tournament. They achieved this after finishing second in the Africa Under-19 Championship held in Zambia. During the championship, they defeated more established associate teams from other African cricket-playing nations. Unfortunately, they were unable to participate in the tournament hosted by Canada due to visa issues, which prevented them from reaching the host nation.

=== Corporate restructuring and rebranding ===
To modernize its administration and expand international commercial opportunities, the organization underwent a corporate restructuring, dropping its legacy "Sierra Leone Cricket Association" title to officially rebrand as Cricket Sierra Leone (CSL). Following this restructuring, the governing body expanded its operational capacity, subsequently gaining full voting rights within the International Cricket Council (ICC) framework. Alongside the institutional rebranding, the body completely migrated its digital operations and media updates to fresh public profiles reflecting the new name.
