= Indonesian Cricket Association =

Official governing body of the sport of cricket in Indonesia

- Sport: Cricket
- Founded: 2000; 25 years ago
- Affiliation: International Cricket Council
- Affiliation date: 2001
- Regional affiliation: Asian Cricket Council (2024–); ICC East Asia-Pacific (2001–)
- Location: Jakarta, Indonesia
- Chairman: Abhiram Singh Yadav

Official website
- cricketina.com
- (Indonesia)

Indonesian Cricket Association (Indonesian: Persatuan Cricket Indonesia) abbreviated as PCI is the official governing body of the sport of cricket in Indonesia. Its current headquarters is in Jakarta, Indonesia. Cricket Indonesia is responsible for the promotion and development of cricket in Indonesia. Cricket Indonesia is active in developing cricket in schools. This is achieved by Cricket Indonesia's development officers. The major areas that have been developed for Cricket are Jakarta, Jawa Barat, and Bali. Cricket Indonesia is Indonesia's representative at the International Cricket Council and is an associate member and has been a member of that body since 2001. It is also a member of the East Asia-Pacific Cricket Council.

On January 31, 2024, the Indonesian Cricket Association joined the Asian Cricket Council (ACC).

== History ==
Cricket Indonesia has been built since 2000 and changed its name became Persatuan Cricket Indonesia on February 13, 2011, when it was accepted as a KONI (Komite Olahraga Nasional Indonesia) member. In early year, it became an official representative for Indonesia in International Cricket Council as an affiliation member in ICC East Asia Pacific. Persatuan Cricket Indonesia (PCI) has a purpose to make cricket become one of the good-performing sports and get big three position as the most popular sport in Indonesia. It also tries to spread existence of cricket in every region of Indonesia. It has 20 province committees from Aceh until Papua. Those members have duties to organize every competition, introduce and socialize cricket in the society.

PCI has succeeded to do its programs because cricket has been growing fast in Indonesia. PCI is still developing its programs to be qualified such as give training, short course and seminar for coaches, referees, and cricket supporting components. The most important thing is becoming a national pride sport for Indonesia. Currently Indonesia is participating in world recognized tournament and has both Indonesia women's national cricket team and Indonesia national cricket team which is the Men side of the team. Indonesia Men's team is ranked 80th while Indonesia women's team is ranked 22nd on Twenty20 International & Women's Twenty20 International World Rankings.

The largest Platform for cricket in Indonesia is Jakarta Cricket Association.

Set-up as the first Cricket Association in Indonesia, way back in 1992, the JCA is the premier Cricket association in the country. With more than 400 players from across 10 nationalities playing across 3 grounds, it is an active & thriving association. Games are played virtually non-stop, across 3 formats (a 40 overs league, T20 & 6s formats) and over 50 weeks in a year. The JCA League, the premier competition has 16 teams, competing across 2 Divisions for Season's honors. The T20 tournament also has 12 teams competing over a 10-week, intensely fought competition and serves as a great filler in between seasons. The Jakarta International 6s cricket tournament is a great opportunity for foreign teams from many countries to come play cricket & also enjoy the great hospitality offered by Indonesia. The JCA through its tournaments also provides a great platform for budding Indonesian cricketers to hone their skills & for new ones to test the waters. The JCA league has been the training ground for all of the Indonesian team cricketers from the Jakarta area.

As a grand celebration of the successes of the league, the JCA also holds its Annual Gala dinner every year which has become an important event in the Jakarta sporting calendar. This dinner has had several cricketing greats grace the occasion. They include Sunil Gavaskar, Kapil Dev, Sir Ian Botham, Sir Vivian Richards, Dean Jones, Sir Richard Hadlee, Tom Moody, Damien Martyn, Kris Srikkanth, Geoff Marsh, Merv Hughes, Ian Chappel, Farokh Engineer etc.

== National teams ==
Men's

- Indonesia national cricket team

Women's

- Indonesia women's national cricket team
