= Brazilian Cricket Confederation =

Sports governing body in Brazil

- Sport: Cricket
- Jurisdiction: Brazil
- Founded: 2001
- Affiliation: International Cricket Council
- Affiliation date: 2002
- Regional affiliation: Americas
- Location: Poços de Caldas, Minas Gerais, Brazil

Official website
- www.cricketbrasil.org/en/
- (Brazil)

The Brazilian Cricket Confederation (Brazilian Portuguese: Confederação Brasileira de Cricket; CBC) is the official governing body of the sport of cricket in Brazil. Its current headquarters is in Brasília, Brazil. The association is Brazil's representative at the International Cricket Council and became an affiliate member of that body in 2002. It is included in the ICC Americas region. In 2017, it was upgraded to the status of an ICC associate member

== History ==
Cricket in Brazil began in the mid-1800s in Rio de Janeiro, during a period when a portion of the city's population was British or of British descent. By the early 1860s, a number of cricket clubs were in operation, including the British CC, Artisan Amateurs CC, Rio British CC, Anglo-Brazilian CC and the British and American Club.

In 1872, George Cox formed the Rio Cricket Club, which soon began using the field as its home. In the early 1880s, George's son Oscar organized Brazil's first football games on this same ground. In 1889, Brazil became a Republic and Princess Isabel was forced to move from her residence. The cricket ground was taken over by the new government, and although the sport was allowed to continue for a time, a permanent facility was now required. In 1922, the Brazil Cricket Association (BCA) was formed, with R.A. Brooking as its first President.

As cricket in Rio de Janeiro faded from the scene, it was left to São Paulo to carry the torch at SPAC until 1989, when the Brasília Cricket Association (ABRAC) was formed which fields men's and women's teams. In 1999 in Curitiba, Paraná, HSBC Bank built a cricket ground at its staff sports facility, which is home to Curitiba cricket. Then in 2011, the Carioca Cricket Club was founded and breathed new life into cricket in Rio. Most recently, the Minas Gerais Cricket Club in Belo Horizonte, and Poços de Caldas Cricket, also in Minas, both formed in 2013.

== See also ==
- Brazil national cricket team
- Brazil women's national cricket team
