= Cricket Chile =

Governing body of the sport of cricket in Chile

The Chilean Cricket Association (Spanish: Asociación Chilena de Cricket) is the official governing body of the sport of cricket in Chile. Its current headquarters is in Santiago, Chile. The organisation is Chile's representative at the International Cricket Council and is an affiliate member and has been a member of that body since 2002. It is included in the ICC Americas region. In 2017, became an associate member.

== History ==
Cricket is recorded as having first been played in Chile in 1829, in the coastal city of Valparaíso between the officers and men of two Royal Navy vessels. The Valparaíso Cricket Club was founded in 1860, with regular matches scheduled between residents throughout the latter part of the 19th century. Chile now possesses a rich history of international cricket, including three visits by the MCC, in 1960, 2001, and 2007 and a record in the South American Cricket Championship second only to Argentina. There are now over 2,000 children involved in all levels of junior cricket in Chile, with a competitive national team at U13, U15 and U19 levels.

The senior national team plays in Division 3 of the ICC Americas Championship, finishing second in the 2008 tournament, ahead of Belize, Peru and Brazil.

== See also ==
- Chile national cricket team
- Chile women's national cricket team
