= Argentine Cricket Association =

Sports governing body in Argentina

Cricket Argentina Asociación de Cricket Argentino
- Sport: Cricket
- Jurisdiction: Argentina
- Abbreviation: ACA
- Founded: 1913; 113 years ago
- Affiliation: International Cricket Council
- Affiliation date: 1974 (associate member)
- Regional affiliation: ICC Americas
- Headquarters: Buenos Aires
- President: Hernán Pereyra
- Vice president: Martín Cortabarria

Official website
- cricketargentina.com
- (Argentina)

The Argentine Cricket Association (Spanish: Asociación de Críquet Argentino; ACA), also known as Cricket Argentina, is the governing body for the sport of cricket in Argentina. The organization was established in 1913, it has been an associate member of the International Cricket Council (ICC) since 1974. Its headquarters is located in Buenos Aires, where Argentina's oldest cricket club is located.

== See also ==
- Cricket in Argentina
- Argentina national cricket team
- Argentina women's national cricket team
- Argentina national under-19 cricket team
