= Mexico Cricket Association =

Sports governing body in Mexico

Mexico is an Associate member of the International Cricket Council (ICC). Mexico joined the ICC as an Affiliate in 2004 and became an associate member in 2017. Mexico is included in the ICC Americas region.

The Mexico Cricket Association is the official governing organ for cricket in Mexico and it is based at the Reforma Athletic Club, Reforma San Pablo, San Juan Totoltepec and Naucalpan, State of Mexico (part of the Mexico City Metropolitan Area). The Mexican cricket season runs from late September to late May.

There is a 20-over league in which four teams - Mexico Union Cricket Club, Aztecs, Aguilas, and Reforma - compete for the Lincoln Clarke Trophy. 20-over social games are held, including an Ambassador's Cup, Cricketers vs Footballers, India vs Pakistan, ANZAC Day, and Asia vs Rest of the World. All league and social games are played at the Reforma Athletic Club. The Reforma Athletic Club has the second highest turf wicket in the world. A weekend sixes tournament takes place in Tequisquiapan, Querétaro, a small town to the north of Mexico City.

The Mexico Cricket Association has a junior development programme – Las Iguanas – where boys and girls between the ages of 8 and 13 are taught cricket at the Reforma Athletic Club, including hand eye coordination skills, batting, bowling, and fielding technique, and the spirit of cricket, Cricket is also taught to school children in Tequisquiapan.

Mexico sends an international team to take part in the biennial 20-over Central American Championships and the annual 20-over South American Championships. The Mexico Cricket Association was instrumental in setting up the first Central American Championships in Belize in 2006, and went on to both host and win the tournament the following year. Mexico won the tournament again in 2013. Mexico made its debut in the 2014 edition South American Championships in Peru and won the tournament.

Mexico also hosts international touring teams. The Mexico Cricket Association welcomed the Marylebone Cricket Club to Mexico for the first time in March 2017 for a series of 20-over games.
