= 2027 Under-19 Women's T20 World Cup qualification =

Cricket tournament

2027 ICC Under-19 Women's T20 World Cup qualification
- Dates: 8 March – 5 September 2026
- Administrators: International Cricket Council; ICC Africa; ICC Asia; ICC Americas; ICC East Asia-Pacific; ICC Europe
- Cricket format: Limited-overs (20 overs)
- Participants: 28
- Matches: 72

The 2027 ICC Under-19 Women's T20 World Cup qualification was a series of regional qualification tournaments that determined the final five teams for the 2027 Under-19 Women's T20 World Cup, which will be hosted by Bangladesh and Nepal. Qualification tournaments were held in Africa, Americas, Asia, East-Asia Pacific.

== Qualified teams ==
Details of the teams qualified for 2027 Under-19 Women's Cricket World Cup
Team	Method of qualification	Date of qualification	Venue(s)	No. of teams	Last time qualified	Total times qualified	Previous best performance
Bangladesh	Hosts	13 November 2022	—N/a	2	2025	3	Super 6 (2023, 2025)
Nepal	Hosts	13 November 2022	—N/a	2	2025	2	Group stage (2025)
Australia	2025 Under-19 Women's T20 World Cup (Top 9 full member teams from the previous tournament excluding hosts)	2 February 2025	Malaysia	9	2025	3	Semi-finals (2025)
England	2025 Under-19 Women's T20 World Cup (Top 9 full member teams from the previous tournament excluding hosts)	2 February 2025	Malaysia	9	2025	3	Runners-up (2023)
India	2025 Under-19 Women's T20 World Cup (Top 9 full member teams from the previous tournament excluding hosts)	2 February 2025	Malaysia	9	2025	3	Winners (2023, 2025)
Ireland	2025 Under-19 Women's T20 World Cup (Top 9 full member teams from the previous tournament excluding hosts)	2 February 2025	Malaysia	9	2025	3	Super 6 (2023, 2025)
New Zealand	2025 Under-19 Women's T20 World Cup (Top 9 full member teams from the previous tournament excluding hosts)	2 February 2025	Malaysia	9	2025	3	Semi-finals (2023)
Pakistan	2025 Under-19 Women's T20 World Cup (Top 9 full member teams from the previous tournament excluding hosts)	2 February 2025	Malaysia	9	2025	3	Super 6 (2023)
South Africa	2025 Under-19 Women's T20 World Cup (Top 9 full member teams from the previous tournament excluding hosts)	2 February 2025	Malaysia	9	2025	3	Runners-up (2025)
Sri Lanka	2025 Under-19 Women's T20 World Cup (Top 9 full member teams from the previous tournament excluding hosts)	2 February 2025	Malaysia	9	2025	3	Super 6 (2023, 2025)
West Indies	2025 Under-19 Women's T20 World Cup (Top 9 full member teams from the previous tournament excluding hosts)	2 February 2025	Malaysia	9	2025	3	Super 6 (2023, 2025)
Nigeria	Africa Qualifier	5 September 2026	Tanzania	1	2025	2	Super 6 (2025)
United States	Americas Qualifier	16 August 2026	Cayman Islands	1	2025	3	Super 6 (2025)
United Arab Emirates	Asia Qualifier	29 July 2026	Malaysia	1	2023	2	Super 6 (2023)
Samoa	East Asia-Pacific Qualifier	13 April 2026	Papua New Guinea	1	2025	2	Group stage (2025)
Scotland	Europe Qualifier	21 October 2026	—N/a	1	2025	3	Group stage (2023, 2025)
Total				16			

== Africa ==
The Africa Qualifier was divided into two divisions, with Division 2 played between 8 and 14 March 2026 in Uganda, and the top two teams advanced to Division 1, which was held from 30 August to 5 September 2026 in Tanzania.

Division 2	Division 1	
Division 2	Group A	Group B
Cameroon; Kenya; Malawi; Mozambique; Sierra Leone	Malawi; Nigeria; Tanzania; Uganda	Kenya; Namibia; Rwanda; Zimbabwe

=== Division 2 ===
The Africa Division 2 Qualifier was played between 8 and 14 March 2026 in Uganda.

==== Points table ====
Pos	Team	Pld	W	L	NR	Pts	NRR	Qualification
1	Kenya	4	4	0	0	8	3.881	Advanced to Division 1
2	Malawi	4	2	1	1	5	1.545	Advanced to Division 1
3	Sierra Leone	4	2	2	0	4	−0.199	Eliminated
4	Mozambique	4	1	2	1	3	−1.833	Eliminated
5	Cameroon	4	0	4	0	0	−4.592	Eliminated

Source: CricClubs

Fixtures

8 March 2026
09:30
Scorecard

Cameroon; 42 (13.4 overs)	v	Malawi; 43/2 (6.4 overs)
Akele Doris 14 (19); Bridget Kasinja 4/5 (3.4 overs)		Angela Lumbe 27* (28); Akele Doris 1/9 (2.4 overs)

Malawi won by 8 wickets
Entebbe Cricket Oval, Entebbe
Player of the match: Bridget Kasinja (Mal)

- Malawi won the toss and elected to field.

8 March 2026
14:00
Scorecard

Mozambique; 56 (11.2 overs)	v	Kenya; 57/1 (5.4 overs)
Yudney Murrure 10 (10); Stella Rodgers 4/14 (3.2 overs)		Melvin Khagoitsa 15* (7)

Kenya won by 9 wickets
Entebbe Cricket Oval, Entebbe
Player of the match: Stella Rodgers (Ken)

- Mozambique won the toss and elected to bat.

9 March 2026
09:30
Scorecard

Kenya; 161/3 (20 overs)	v	Cameroon; 35 (15.1 overs)
Melvin Khagoitsa 71 (59); Nanfack Dorcasse 1/27 (4 overs)		Menguene Clara 12 (22); Melvin Khagoitsa 3/3 (3.1 overs)

Kenya won by 126 runs
Entebbe Cricket Oval, Entebbe
Player of the match: Melvin Khagoitsa (Ken)

- Kenya won the toss and elected to bat.

9 March 2026
14:00
Scorecard

Malawi; 110/7 (20 overs)	v	Sierra Leone; 40 (9.4 overs)
Angela Lumbe 46* (57); Isha Bangura 3/8 (4 overs)		Theresa Tommy 16 (23); Esther Richard 4/16 (4 overs)

Malawi won by 70 runs
Entebbe Cricket Oval, Entebbe
Player of the match: Angela Lumbe (Maw)

- Sierra Leone won the toss and elected to field.

11 March 2026
09:30
Scorecard

Mozambique	v	Malawi

Match abandoned
Entebbe Cricket Oval, Entebbe

- Mozambique won the toss and elected to bat.
- No play was possible due to rain.

11 March 2026
14:00
Scorecard

Cameroon; 37 (12.4 overs)	v	Sierra Leone; 38/1 (7.2 overs)
Zang Chang 6 (6); Theresa Tommy 2/7 (2 overs)		Theresa Tommy 18* (22); Fokou Fortune 1/12 (2.2 overs)

Sierra Leone won by 9 wickets
Entebbe Cricket Oval, Entebbe
Player of the match: Theresa Tommy (Sle)

- Cameroon won the toss and elected to bat.
- The match was reduced to 13 overs per side due to rain.

12 March 2026
09:30
Scorecard

Sierra Leone; 63/6 (19 overs)	v	Kenya; 64/4 (13 overs)
Isatu Sesay 23 (48); Nezarine Oluoch 2/12 (3 overs)		Zainabu Hamisi 20 (29); Kadiatu Sawaneh 2/10 (2 overs)

Kenya won by 6 wickets
Entebbe Cricket Oval, Entebbe
Player of the match: Melvin Khagoitsa (Ken)

- Kenya won the toss and elected to field.
- The match was reduced to 19 overs per side due to rain.

12 March 2026
14:00
Scorecard

Mozambique; 148/8 (20 overs)	v	Cameroon; 78 (16.5 overs)
Regina Mazumba 48 (38); Ateh Fulai 3/25 (4 overs)		Sakinatou Moussa 11 (14); Leonor Mandlate 3/11 (3 overs)

Mozambique won by 70 runs
Entebbe Cricket Oval, Entebbe
Player of the match: Regina Mazumba (Moz)

- Cameroon won the toss and elected to field.

14 March 2026
09:30
Scorecard

Mozambique; 40 (13 overs)	v	Sierra Leone; 41/2 (4.1 overs)
Leonor Mandlate 7 (8); Theresa Tommy 4/12 (4 overs)		Mary Kamara 18 (15); Leonor Mandlate 1/16 (2 overs)

Sierra Leone won by 8 wickets
Entebbe Cricket Oval, Entebbe
Player of the match: Theresa Tommy (Sle)

- Mozambique won the toss and elected to bat.

14 March 2026
14:00
Scorecard

Kenya; 112/2 (20 overs)	v	Malawi; 70/9 (20 overs)
Zainabu Hamisi 31 (32)		Princess Chidatha 19* (29); Melvin Khagoitsa 4/8 (4 overs)

Kenya won by 42 runs
Entebbe Cricket Oval, Entebbe
Player of the match: Melvin Khagoitsa (Ken)

- Malawi won the toss and elected to field.

=== Division 1 ===
The Africa Division 1 Qualifier was held from 30 August to 5 September 2026 in Tanzania.

==== Group A ====
Pos	Team	Pld	W	L	Pts	NRR	Qualification
1	Nigeria (Q)	3	3	0	6	3.272	Advanced to the Semifinals
2	Uganda	3	2	1	4	1.282	Advanced to the Semifinals
3	Tanzania (H)	3	1	2	2	−1.089	Advanced to the Playoffs
4	Malawi	3	0	3	0	−3.731	Advanced to the Playoffs

Source: CricClubs
(H) Host; (Q) Qualified for the 2027 Under-19 Women's T20 World Cup

Fixtures

30 August 2026
09:30
Scorecard

Uganda; 59/7 (20 overs)	v	Nigeria; 60/6 (13.1 overs)
Gilingish Nabulime 22 (34); Chisom Okpe 2/4 (4 overs)		Omosigho Eguakun 24 (29); Sarah Tino 5/13 (4 overs)

Nigeria won by 4 wickets
University of Dar es Salaam Ground 1, Dar es Salaam
Umpires: Dedunu de Silva (SL) and Habib Enesi (Nga)
Player of the match: Sarah Tino (Uga)

- Uganda won the toss and elected to bat.

30 August 2026
14:00
Scorecard

Tanzania; 113/5 (20 overs)	v	Malawi; 67 (17 overs)
Nzela Magembe 28 (36); Stella Kunje 2/16 (2 overs)		Favour Piliyesi 16 (17); Maria Massawe 3/11 (4 overs)

Tanzania won by 46 runs
University of Dar es Salaam Ground 1, Dar es Salaam
Umpires: Lauren Agenbag (SA) and Eloise du Plooy (Nam)
Player of the match: Maria Massawe (Tan)

- Tanzania won the toss and elected to bat.

31 August 2026
09:30
Scorecard

Nigeria; 152/7 (20 overs)	v	Malawi; 58 (18.3 overs)
Shola Adekunle 32 (27); Princess Chidatha 2/26 (4 overs)		Sphiwe Frank 24 (26); Jennifer Godwin 4/5 (2.3 overs)

Nigeria won by 94 runs
University of Dar es Salaam Ground 1, Dar es Salaam
Umpires: Lauren Agenbag (SA) and Habib Enesi (Nga)
Player of the match: Shola Adekunle (Nga)

- Malawi won the toss and elected to field.

31 August 2026
14:00
Scorecard

Tanzania; 41 (16.1 overs)	v	Uganda; 42/5 (9.1 overs)
Joan Jackson 9 (16); Mischelle Ariago 2/8 (4 overs)		Joan Ilora 14* (14); Dorice Helment 3/13 (3.1 overs)

Uganda won by 5 wickets
University of Dar es Salaam Ground 1, Dar es Salaam
Umpires: Norbert Abbi (Uga) and Eloise du Plooy (Nam)
Player of the match: Mischelle Ariago (Uga)

- Tanzania won the toss and elected to bat.

2 September 2026
09:30
Scorecard

Malawi; 44 (16 overs)	v	Uganda; 46/0 (7.3 overs)
Angela Lumbe 17 (43); Devine Nyamer 3/7 (4 overs); Sarah Tino 3/7 (4 overs)		Gilingish Nabulime 30* (21)

Uganda won by 10 wickets
University of Dar es Salaam Ground 2, Dar es Salaam
Umpires: Eloise du Plooy (Nam) and Adil Kassam (Tan)
Player of the match: Sarah Tino (Uga)

- Uganda won the toss and elected to field.

2 September 2026
14:00
Scorecard

Nigeria; 133/7 (20 overs)	v	Tanzania; 76/8 (20 overs)
Omosigho Eguakun 50 (46); Maria Massawe 3/20 (4 overs); Lightness Eladius 3/20 (4 overs)		Saumu Hussein 29 (40); Jennifer Godwin 2/9 (2 overs)

Nigeria won by 57 runs
University of Dar es Salaam Ground 2, Dar es Salaam
Umpires: Lauren Agenbag (SA) and Arsalan Premji (Tan)
Player of the match: Omosigho Eguakun (Nga)

- Nigeria won the toss and elected to bat.

==== Group B ====
Pos	Team	Pld	W	L	NR	Pts	NRR	Qualification
1	Zimbabwe	3	3	0	0	6	2.984	Advanced to the Semifinals
2	Rwanda	3	2	1	0	4	1.591	Advanced to the Semifinals
3	Kenya	3	1	2	0	2	−1.352	Advanced to the Playoffs
4	Namibia	3	0	3	0	0	−3.086	Advanced to the Playoffs

Source: CricClubs

Fixtures

30 August 2026
09:30
Scorecard

Kenya; 121/9 (20 overs)	v	Namibia; 67 (16.2 overs)
Marion Jacinta 26* (27); Veronika Tobias 4/17 (4 overs)		Eviste Iiyambo 15 (33); Melvin Khagoitsa 4/5 (4 overs)

Kenya won by 54 runs
University of Dar es Salaam Ground 2, Dar es Salaam
Umpires: Norbert Abbi (Uga) and Arsalan Premji (Tan)
Player of the match: Melvin Khagoitsa (Ken)

- Kenya won the toss and elected to bat.

30 August 2026
14:30
Scorecard

Zimbabwe; 139/7 (20 overs)	v	Rwanda; 88 (19.2 overs)
Lorraine Pemhiwa 70 (58); Justine Ingabire 3/24 (4 overs)		Deborah Uwase 23 (21); Beloved Biza 4/14 (4 overs)

Zimbabwe won by 51 runs
University of Dar es Salaam Ground 2, Dar es Salaam
Umpires: Kerrin Klaaste (SA) and Adil Kassam (Tan)
Player of the match: Lorraine Pemhiwa (Zim)

- Zimbabwe won the toss and elected to bat.

31 August 2026
09:30
Scorecard

Rwanda; 147/9 (20 overs)	v	Namibia; 65 (13.1 overs)
Fanny Utagushimaninde 75 (53); Unombuiro Kaanjosa 4/20 (4 overs)		Unombuiro Kaanjosa 22 (24); Chanceline Umutoni 4/21 (3 overs)

Rwanda won by 82 runs
University of Dar es Salaam Ground 2, Dar es Salaam
Umpires: Kerrin Klaaste (SA) and Arsalan Premji (Tan)
Player of the match: Fanny Utagushimaninde (Rwa)

- Rwanda won the toss and elected to bat.

31 August 2026
14:00
Scorecard

Zimbabwe; 128/7 (20 overs)	v	Kenya; 49 (15.1 overs)
Beloved Biza 40 (38); Zainab Hamisi 2/21 (4 overs)		Zainab Hamisi 15 (19); Tadiwa Garutsa 3/9 (4 overs)

Zimbabwe won by 79 runs
University of Dar es Salaam Ground 2, Dar es Salaam
Umpires: Dedunu de Silva (SL) and Adil Kassam (Tan)
Player of the match: Beloved Biza (Zim)

- Zimbabwe won the toss and elected to bat.

2 September 2026
09:30
Scorecard

Kenya; 69/9 (20 overs)	v	Rwanda; 70/5 (9.4 overs)
Melvin Khagoitsa 28 (42); Grace Mugwaneza 2/10 (4 overs)		Lina Ikuzwe 19* (18); Marion Jacinta 2/8 (2 overs)

Rwanda won by 5 wickets
University of Dar es Salaam Ground 1, Dar es Salaam
Umpires: Norbert Abbi (Uga) and Habib Enesi (Nga)
Player of the match: Lina Ikuzwe (Rwa)

- Kenya won the toss and elected to bat.

2 September 2026
14:00
Scorecard

Namibia; 86 (18.2 overs)	v	Zimbabwe; 87/5 (12.5 overs)
Elly Kambonde 45* (43); Buhlebenkosi Maposa 3/18 (4 overs)		Tadiwa Garutsa 31* (32); Unombuiro Kaanjosa 1/8 (1 over)

Zimbabwe won by 5 wickets
University of Dar es Salaam Ground 1, Dar es Salaam
Umpires: Dedunu de Silva (SL) and Kerrin Klaaste (SA)
Player of the match: Buhlebenkosi Maposa (Zim)

- Namibia won the toss and elected to bat.

=== Knockout stage ===
==== Semifinals ====
Semi-finals
A1	Nigeria	66/1 (10.4 overs)
B2	Rwanda	65 (19.1 overs)
B1	Zimbabwe	104/9 (20 overs)
A2	Uganda	84/9 (20 overs)

Final
SF1W	Nigeria	98/6 (20 overs)
SF2W	Zimbabwe	94 (19.5 overs)
3rd-place Playoff
SF1L	Rwanda	73/9 (20 overs)
SF2L	Uganda	74/3 (16.1 overs)

==== Playoffs ====
Play-offs
A3	Tanzania	100/8 (20 overs)
B4	Namibia	75 (15.5 overs)
B3	Kenya	87/6 (20 overs)
A4	Malawi	28 (13.3 overs)

5th-place Playoff
P1W	Tanzania	106/5 (20 overs)
P2W	Kenya	77 (19 overs)
7th-place Playoff
P1L	Namibia	39/1 (5.1 overs)
P2L	Malawi	38 (12.2 overs)

Fixtures

Play-off 1
3 September 2026
09:30
Scorecard

Tanzania; 100/8 (20 overs)	v	Namibia; 75 (15.5 overs)
Joan Jackson 15 (14); Monique Muller 1/5 (2 overs)		Elly Kambonde 28 (33); Lightness Eladius 4/27 (4 overs)

Tanzania won by 25 runs
University of Dar es Salaam Ground 2, Dar es Salaam
Umpires: Kerrin Klaaste (SA) and Habib Enesi (Nga)
Player of the match: Lightness Eladius (Tan)

- Tanzania won the toss and elected to bat.

Play-off 2
3 September 2026
14:00
Scorecard

Kenya; 87/6 (20 overs)	v	Malawi; 28 (13.3 overs)
Nancy Wafula 29* (45); Sphiwe Frank 2/16 (4 overs)		Alinafe Kawirawira 8 (10); Janet Nthenya 3/9 (4 overs)

Kenya won by 59 runs
University of Dar es Salaam Ground 2, Dar es Salaam
Umpires: Norbert Abbi (Nga) and Dedunu de Silva (SL)
Player of the match: Stella Rodgers (Ken)

- Kenya won the toss and elected to bat.

Semi-final 1
3 September 2026
09:30
Scorecard

Rwanda; 65 (19.1 overs)	v	Nigeria; 66/1 (10.4 overs)
Niyorukundo Uwase 20 (28); Christabel Chukwuonye 4/6 (3.1 overs)		Omosigho Eguakun 35* (29); Ruth Uwimana 1/16 (3 overs)

Nigeria won by 9 wickets
University of Dar es Salaam Ground 1, Dar es Salaam
Umpires: Lauren Agenbag (SA) and Adil Kassam (Tan)
Player of the match: Christabel Chukwuonye (Nga)

- Rwanda won the toss and elected to bat.

Semi-final 2
3 September 2026
14:00
Scorecard

Zimbabwe; 104/9 (20 overs)	v	Uganda; 84/9 (20 overs)
Lorraine Pemhiwa 28 (30); Sheirah Namagoba 3/21 (4 overs)		Mohammed Jimia 24 (33); Vanessa Mayedza 3/13 (4 overs)

Zimbabwe won by 20 runs
University of Dar es Salaam Ground 1, Dar es Salaam
Umpires: Arsalan Premji (Tan) and Eloise du Plooy (Nam)
Player of the match: Tadiwa Garutsa (Zim)

- Uganda won the toss and elected to field.

7th-place Playoff
5 September 2026
09:30
Scorecard

Malawi; 38 (12.2 overs)	v	Namibia; 39/1 (5.1 overs)
Shavoni Akileni 8 (15); Lelly Khumus 5/9 (4 overs)		Unombuiro Kaanjosa 17* (13); Bridget Kasinja 1/12 (2 overs)

Namibia won by 9 wickets
University of Dar es Salaam Ground 2, Dar es Salaam
Umpires: Lauren Agenbag (SA) and Eloise du Plooy (Nam)
Player of the match: Lelly Khumus (Nam)

- Malawi won the toss and elected to bat.

5th-place Playoff
5 September 2026
14:00
Scorecard

Tanzania; 106/5 (20 overs)	v	Kenya; 77 (19 overs)
Rebeca Martin 37 (54); Melvin Khagoitsa 2/9 (4 overs)		Nancy Wafula 21 (26); Dorice Helmet 5/8 (4 overs)

Tanzania won by 29 runs
University of Dar es Salaam Ground 2, Dar es Salaam
Umpires: Norbert Abbi (Nga) and Arsalan Premji (Tan)
Player of the match: Dorice Helmet (Tan)

- Tanzania won the toss and elected to bat.

3rd-place Playoff
5 September 2026
09:30
Scorecard

Rwanda; 73/9 (20 overs)	v	Uganda; 74/3 (16.1 overs)
Fanny Utagushimaninde 21 (19); Sheirah Namagoba 3/5 (4 overs)		Mary Namiiro 38* (33); Ruth Uwimana 2/15 (4 overs)

Uganda won by 7 wickets
University of Dar es Salaam Ground 1, Dar es Salaam
Umpires: Habib Enesi (Nga) and Adil Kassam (Tan)
Player of the match: Mary Namiiro (Uga)

- Uganda won the toss and elected to field.

Final
5 September 2026
14:00
Scorecard

Nigeria; 98/6 (20 overs)	v	Zimbabwe; 94 (19.5 overs)
Christabel Chukwuonye 21 (19); Christine Mutasa 2/11 (4 overs)		Salem Museka 27 (32); Usen Peace 3/19 (4 overs)

Nigeria won by 4 runs
University of Dar es Salaam Ground 1, Dar es Salaam
Umpires: Dedunu de Silva (SL) and Kerrin Klaaste (SA)

- Nigeria won the toss and elected to bat.

== Americas ==
The Americas Qualifier was originally scheduled to be held in Canada, but was moved to the Cayman Islands and was scheduled for 9 to 16 August 2026. The qualifier consisted of four teams, including a multinational team called NextGen XI, which consisted of players from other member nations of the region.

=== Points table ===
Pos	Team	Pld	W	L	Pts	NRR	Qualification
1	United States	6	6	0	12	5.453	Qualified for the 2027 Under-19 Women's T20 World Cup
2	Canada	6	3	3	6	−0.016	Eliminated
3	NextGen XI	6	2	4	4	−1.457	Eliminated
4	Argentina	6	1	5	2	−3.318	Eliminated

Source: CricClubs

Fixtures

9 August 2026
10:00
Scorecard

Canada; 46 (19 overs)	v	United States; 47/0 (7.2 overs)
Khadeeja Fatima 7 (15); Mahek Desai 5/6 (4 overs)		Chetna Pagydyala 25* (25)

United States won by 10 wickets
Jimmy Powell Oval, George Town
Player of the match: Mahek Desai (USA)

- Canada won the toss and elected to bat.

9 August 2026
14:30
Scorecard

Argentina; 42 (15.5 overs)	v	NextGen XI; 46/2 (7.4 overs)
Ana Dei Castelli 7 (19); Disha Kaveripakam 4/7 (4 overs)		Palak Chauhan 21* (24); Ana Dei Castelli 1/25 (3 overs)

NextGen XI won by 8 wickets
Jimmy Powell Oval, George Town
Player of the match: Clara Valencia (NXG)

- Argentina won the toss and elected to bat.

10 August 2026
10:00
Scorecard

Canada; 93/5 (20 overs)	v	NextGen XI; 80/8 (20 overs)
Harper Chalmers 25 (39); Jashe Trott 1/12 (4 overs)		Palak Chauhan 23 (25); Namrit Dhillon 2/4 (2 overs)

Canada won by 13 runs
Jimmy Powell Oval, George Town
Player of the match: Namrit Dhillon (Can)

- NextGen XI won the toss and elected to field.

10 August 2026
14:30
Scorecard

United States; 180/5 (20 overs)	v	Argentina; 68/9 (18.1 overs)
Chetna Pagydyala 42 (38); Rocio Roquel 3/17 (4 overs)		Maria Mastrangelo 21 (31); Sainavi Kambalapalli 5/10 (3 overs)

United States won by 112 runs
Jimmy Powell Oval, George Town
Player of the match: Sainavi Kambalapalli (USA)

- Argentina won the toss and elected to field.

12 August 2026
10:00
Scorecard

NextGen XI; 47 (10.5 overs)	v	United States; 48/1 (5.4 overs)
Saanvi Sood 20 (13); Saanvi Immadi 5/2 (3 overs)		Anannya Aneesh 37* (28); Disha Kaveripakam 1/16 (3 overs)

United States won by 9 wickets
Jimmy Powell Oval, George Town
Player of the match: Saanvi Immadi (USA)

- NextGen XI won the toss and elected to bat.

12 August 2026
14:30
Scorecard

Canada; 92/4 (20 overs)	v	Argentina; 43 (16.3 overs)
Vritti Dahiya 37 (59); Lara Finocchio 1/8 (2 overs)		Milagros Bestani 12 (18); Vritti Dahiya 3/4 (1.3 overs)

Canada won by 49 runs
Jimmy Powell Oval, George Town
Player of the match: Vritti Dahiya (Can)

- Canada won the toss and elected to bat.

13 August 2026
10:00
Scorecard

United States; 167/3 (20 overs)	v	Argentina; 25 (14.1 overs)
Chetna Pagydyala 61 (45); Rocio Roquel 2/28 (4 overs)		Milagros Bestani 11 (38); Maahi Madhavan 4/3 (3.1 overs)

United States won by 130 runs (DLS method)
Jimmy Powell Oval, George Town
Player of the match: Chetna Pagydyala (USA)

- United States won the toss and elected to bat.
- Argentina were set a revised target of 156 runs off 20 overs due to rain.

13 August 2026
14:30
Scorecard

Canada; 66/5 (14 overs)	v	NextGen XI; 69/2 (14 overs)
Rabbjyot Rajput 14 (23); Giulia Ribeiro 1/7 (3 overs)		Palak Chauhan 32* (44); Sanjana Rao 1/11 (2 overs)

Match tied (NextGen XI won the Super Over)
Jimmy Powell Oval, George Town
Player of the match: Palak Chauhan (NXG)

- NextGen XI won the toss and elected to field.
- The match was reduced to 14 overs per side due to rain.
- NextGen XI were set a revised target of 70 runs off 14 overs due to rain.
- Super Over: NextGen XI 12/1, Canada 7/2

15 August 2026
10:00
Scorecard

Canada; 100/5 (20 overs)	v	Argentina; 74/9 (20 overs)
Vritti Dahiya 34 (50); Julia Andujar 3/22 (4 overs)		Julia Andujar 30 (32); Snigdha Malhotra 4/14 (4 overs)

Canada won by 26 runs
Jimmy Powell Oval, George Town
Player of the match: Harper Chalmers (Can)

- Canada won the toss and elected to bat.

15 August 2026
14:30
Scorecard

United States; 152/6 (20 overs)	v	NextGen XI; 38 (9 overs)
Sainavi Kambalapalli 64 (41); Palak Chauhan 1/20 (4 overs)		Alina Emch 6 (8); Neha Alapati 3/7 (3 overs)

United States won by 114 runs
Jimmy Powell Oval, George Town
Player of the match: Sainavi Kambalapalli (USA)

- United States won the toss and elected to bat.

16 August 2026
10:00
Scorecard

NextGen XI; 81 (17.2 overs)	v	Argentina; 82/2 (18.2 overs)
Saanvi Sood 23 (31); Milagros Hagen 4/7 (2 overs)		Milagros Bestani 23* (43); Jashe Trott 1/11 (4 overs)

Argentina won by 8 wickets
Jimmy Powell Oval, George Town
Player of the match: Milagros Hagen (Arg)

- NextGen XI won the toss and elected to bat.

16 August 2026
14:30
Scorecard

Canada; 65/7 (20 overs)	v	United States; 66/2 (11 overs)
Vritti Dahiya 19* (32); Mahek Desai 3/7 (4 overs)		Chetna Pagydyala 16* (27); Vritti Dahiya 1/12 (3 overs)

United States won by 8 Wickets
Jimmy Powell Oval, George Town
Player of the match: Mahek Desai (USA)

- Canada won the toss and elected to bat.

== Asia ==
The Asia Qualifier (which was initially slated to be held in Hong Kong from 20 to 29 April 2026) was held in Malaysia from 23 to 29 July 2026.

=== Points table ===
==== Group A ====
Pos	Team	Pld	W	L	Pts	NRR	Qualification
1	United Arab Emirates (Q)	3	3	0	6	3.352	Advanced to the Semi-finals
2	Malaysia (H)	3	2	1	4	0.881	Advanced to the Semi-finals
3	Qatar	3	1	2	2	−2.486	Advanced to the Play-offs
4	Hong Kong	3	0	3	0	−2.487	Advanced to the Play-offs

Source: CricClubs
(H) Host; (Q) Qualified for the 2027 Under-19 Women's T20 World Cup

Fixtures

23 July 2026
09:15
Scorecard

United Arab Emirates; 144/4 (20 overs)	v	Hong Kong; 31/4 (8 overs)
Neha Kumari 50* (47); Fatima Amir 2/20 (4 overs)		Fatima Amir 8 (13); Janani Thirukkumaran 1/5 (2 overs)

United Arab Emirates won by 37 runs (DLS method)
Bayuemas Oval, Kuala Lumpur
Player of the match: Neha Kumari (UAE)

- Hong Kong won the toss and elected to field.
- Hong Kong were set a revised target of 69 runs in 8 overs due to rain.

23 July 2026
14:00
Scorecard

Qatar; 58 (17.3 overs)	v	Malaysia; 59/5 (11.3 overs)
Sargam Patel 11 (9); Nur Alia Natijah 2/8 (4 overs)		Irdina Beh Nabil 17* (24); Lihara Abeysekara 2/11 (2.3 overs)

Malaysia won by 5 wickets
Bayuemas Oval, Kuala Lumpur
Player of the match: Nur Alia Natijah (Mas)

- Qatar won the toss and elected to bat.

24 July 2026
09:15
Scorecard

United Arab Emirates; 116/6 (20 overs)	v	Malaysia; 70/8 (18.5 overs)
Emily Thomas 18 (28); Irdina Beh Nabil 2/22 (3 overs)		Irdina Beh Nabil 23 (33); Mehak Thakur 3/10 (4 overs)

United Arab Emirates won by 39 runs (DLS method)
UKM-YSD Cricket Oval, Bangi
Player of the match: Mehak Thakur (UAE)

- Malaysia won the toss and elected to field.
- Malaysia were set a revised target of 110 runs in 18.5 overs due to rain.

24 July 2026
14:00
Scorecard

Qatar; 65/4 (11 overs)	v	Hong Kong; 66/6 (11 overs)
Lihara Abeysekara 16 (20); Storm Parker 1/9 (2 overs)		Fatima Amir 29 (24); Maria Jacob 2/6 (1 over)

Qatar won by 8 runs (DLS method)
UKM-YSD Cricket Oval, Bangi
Player of the match: Maria Jacob (Qat)

- Hong Kong won the toss and elected to field.
- The match was reduced to 11 overs per side due to rain.
- Hong Kong were set a revised target of 75 runs in 11 overs due to rain.

26 July 2026
09:15
Scorecard

United Arab Emirates; 139/5 (20 overs)	v	Qatar; 58 (16.3 overs)
Mehul Kulkarni 44* (32); Lihara Abeysekara 2/21 (4 overs)		Maria Jacob 18 (27); Mehak Thakur 2/3 (1 over)

United Arab Emirates won by 81 runs
Bayuemas Oval, Kuala Lumpur
Player of the match: Janani Thirukkumaran (UAE)

- United Arab Emirates won the toss and elected to bat.

26 July 2026
14:00
Scorecard

Malaysia; 95/8 (20 overs)	v	Hong Kong; 43/9 (20 overs)
Nur Aliya Hairun 18 (28); Storm Parker 3/18 (4 overs)		Hailey Wong 8 (23); Irdina Beh Nabil 3/7 (4 overs)

Malaysia won by 52 runs
Bayuemas Oval, Kuala Lumpur
Player of the match: Irdina Beh Nabil (Mas)

- Hong Kong won the toss and elected to field.

==== Group B ====
Pos	Team	Pld	W	L	Pts	NRR	Qualification
1	Thailand	3	3	0	6	1.932	Advanced to the Semi-finals
2	Bhutan	3	2	1	4	−0.295	Advanced to the Semi-finals
3	Myanmar	3	1	2	2	0.213	Advanced to the Play-offs
4	Kuwait	3	0	3	0	−1.682	Advanced to the Play-offs

Source: CricClubs

Fixtures

23 July 2026
09:15
Scorecard

Kuwait; 50/8 (20 overs)	v	Thailand; 51/1 (11 overs)
Angel Gabriella 14 (28); Patcharaporn Sorntha 4/7 (4 overs)		Thanrada Seesawan 25* (28)

Thailand won by 9 wickets
UKM-YSD Cricket Oval, Bangi
Player of the match: Patcharaporn Sorntha (Tha)

- Thailand won the toss and elected to field.

23 July 2026
14:00
Scorecard

Myanmar; 63/9 (20 overs)	v	Bhutan; 64/8 (19.5 overs)
Aye Myat Noe 20 (50); Jigme Tshomo 3/4 (4 overs)		Gyden Dema 16 (34); Wathon Nadi 1/7 (4 overs)

Bhutan won by 2 wickets
UKM-YSD Cricket Oval, Bangi
Player of the match: Jigme Tshomo (Bhu)

- Bhutan won the toss and elected to field.

24 July 2026
09:15
Scorecard

Myanmar; 36 (16.1 overs)	v	Thailand; 37/3 (8.4 overs)
Htet Htet Swe 11 (20); Phonphimon Khongdee 2/3 (2.1 overs)		Naomi Hamilton 15* (12); Wathon Nadi 2/9 (4 overs)

Thailand won by 7 wickets
Bayuemas Oval, Kuala Lumpur
Player of the match: Phonphimon Khongdee (Tha)

- Myanmar won the toss and elected to bat.

24 July 2026
14:00
Scorecard

Kuwait; 70 (19.4 overs)	v	Bhutan; 71/7 (18.5 overs)
Raelyn Maria 16 (33); Unisha Rai 3/10 (3.4 overs)		Samjana Mongar 25* (26); Candice Jerica 3/11 (4 overs)

Bhutan won by 3 wickets
Bayuemas Oval, Kuala Lumpur
Player of the match: Samjana Mongar (Bhu)

- Bhutan won the toss and elected to field.

26 July 2026
09:15
Scorecard

Bhutan; 49/6 (20 overs)	v	Thailand; 50/6 (13.2 overs)
Sonam Pelden 13* (35); Kesinee Kaewjumphol 1/8 (4 overs)		Kanlaya Khongpanapraison 14* (25); Riya Pradhan 3/13 (3 overs)

Thailand won by 4 wickets
UKM-YSD Cricket Oval, Bangi
Player of the match: Kesinee Kaewjumphol (Tha)

- Thailand won the toss and elected to field.

26 July 2026
14:00
Scorecard

Myanmar; 108/8 (20 overs)	v	Kuwait; 56 (16.4 overs)
Aye Myat Noe 28 (37); Swatiba Kuldeepsinh 3/13 (2 overs)		Candice Jerica 20 (37); Htet Htet Swe 3/9 (3.4 overs)

Myanmar won by 52 runs
UKM-YSD Cricket Oval, Bangi
Player of the match: Aye Myat Noe (Mya)

- Kuwait won the toss and elected to field.

=== Knockout stage ===
==== Semi-finals ====
Semi-finals
A1	United Arab Emirates	119/3 (20 overs)
B2	Bhutan	46 (19.2 overs)
B1	Thailand	65/9 (20 overs)
A2	Malaysia	66/9 (19.2 overs)

Final
SF1W	United Arab Emirates	95 (19.3 overs)
SF2W	Malaysia	94/6 (20 overs)
3rd-place Playoff
SF1L	Bhutan	20 (16.1 overs)
SF2L	Thailand	21/1 (4.5 overs)

==== Play-offs ====
Play-offs
A3	Qatar	139/9 (20 overs)
B4	Kuwait	93 (19.3 overs)
B3	Myanmar	93/5 (19 overs)
A4	Hong Kong	92/7 (20 overs)

5th-place Playoff
P1W	Qatar	93 (16.2 overs)
P2W	Myanmar	94/3 (14.5 overs)
7th-place Playoff
P1L	Hong Kong	143/1 (20 overs)
P2L	Kuwait	91/6 (20 overs)

Fixtures

Play-off 1
28 July 2026
09:15
Scorecard

Qatar; 139/9 (20 overs)	v	Kuwait; 93 (19.3 overs)
Fatima Mukadam 32 (30); Swatiba Kuldeepsinh 2/23 (3 overs)		Raelyn Maria 30 (39); Lihara Abeysekara 2/12 (4 overs)

Qatar won by 46 runs
Bayuemas Oval, Kuala Lumpur
Player of the match: Krisheta Kumar (Qat)

- Kuwait won the toss and elected to field.

Play-off 2
28 July 2026
09:15
Scorecard

Hong Kong; 92/7 (20 overs)	v	Myanmar; 93/5 (19 overs)
Storm Parker 43 (56); Aye Myat Noe 2/13 (4 overs)		Aye Myat Noe 20 (24); Fatima Amir 2/12 (4 overs)

Myanmar won by 5 wickets
UKM-YSD Cricket Oval, Bangi
Player of the match: Wathon Nadi (Mya)

- Hong Kong won the toss and elected to bat.

Semi-final 1
28 July 2026
14:00
Scorecard

United Arab Emirates; 119/3 (20 overs)	v	Bhutan; 46 (19.2 overs)
Janani Thirukkumaran 64* (64); Samjana Mongar 2/21 (4 overs)		Tshering Choden 9 (19); Mehak Thakur 2/12 (3 overs)

United Arab Emirates won by 73 runs
Bayuemas Oval, Kuala Lumpur
Player of the match: Janani Thirukkumaran (UAE)

- United Arab Emirates won the toss and elected to bat.

Semi-final 2
28 July 2026
14:00
Scorecard

Thailand; 65/9 (20 overs)	v	Malaysia; 66/9 (19.2 overs)
Phichamon Darajaroen 24 (54); Nurin Imanina 2/4 (1 over)		Nur Qaireen 18 (33); Patcharaporn Sorntha 3/10 (4 overs)

Malaysia won by 1 wicket
UKM-YSD Cricket Oval, Bangi
Player of the match: Suabika Manivannan (Mas)

- Malaysia won the toss and elected to field.

7th-place Playoff
29 July 2026
09:15
Scorecard

Hong Kong; 143/1 (20 overs)	v	Kuwait; 91/6 (20 overs)
Fatima Amir 78* (65); Sahasra Nadimpalli 1/21 (4 overs)		Raelyn Maria 45* (65); Nimbra Arab 2/10 (3 overs)

Hong Kong won by 52 runs
Bayuemas Oval, Kuala Lumpur
Player of the match: Fatima Amir (HK)

- Hong Kong won the toss and elected to bat.

5th-place Playoff
29 July 2026
09:15
Scorecard

Qatar; 93 (16.2 overs)	v	Myanmar; 94/3 (14.5 overs)
Maria Jacob 26 (19); Aye Myat Noe 3/7 (3 overs)		Htet Htet Swe 34* (39); Fatima Mukadam 2/15 (2.5 overs)

Myanmar won by 7 wickets
UKM-YSD Cricket Oval, Bangi
Player of the match: Htet Htet Swe (Mya)

- Myanmar won the toss and elected to field.

3rd-place Playoff
29 July 2026
14:00
Scorecard

Bhutan; 20 (16.1 overs)	v	Thailand; 21/1 (4.5 overs)
Sonam Pelden 4 (10); Phonphimon Khongdee 5/8 (4 overs)		Thanrada Seesawan 12* (20); Jigme Tshomo 1/10 (2 overs)

Thailand won by 9 wickets
UKM-YSD Cricket Oval, Bangi
Player of the match: Phonphimon Khongdee (Tha)

- Thailand won the toss and elected to field.

Final
29 July 2026
14:00
Scorecard

United Arab Emirates; 95 (19.3 overs)	v	Malaysia; 94/6 (20 overs)
Al Maseera Jahangir 31 34; Irdina Beh Nabil 2/20 (4 overs)		Nurin Imanina 36 (40); Al Maseera Jahangir 2/12 (4 overs)

United Arab Emirates won by 1 run
Bayuemas Oval, Kuala Lumpur
Player of the match: Al Maseera Jahangir (UAE)

- United Arab Emirates won the toss and elected to bat.
- United Arab Emirates qualified for the 2027 Under-19 Women's T20 World Cup as a result of this match.

== East Asia-Pacific ==
The East Asia-Pacific Qualifier was held in Papua New Guinea from 8 to 13 April 2026.

=== Points table ===
Pos	Team	Pld	W	L	Pts	NRR	Qualification
1	Samoa	4	4	0	8	2.238	Qualified for the 2027 Under-19 Women's T20 World Cup
2	Indonesia	4	3	1	6	1.050	Eliminated
3	Fiji	4	2	2	4	0.097	Eliminated
4	Papua New Guinea (H)	4	1	3	2	−0.858	Eliminated
5	Vanuatu	4	0	4	0	−2.884	Eliminated

Source: CricClubs
(H) Host

Fixtures

8 April 2026
09:30
Scorecard

Samoa; 131 (20 overs)	v	Vanuatu; 73 (19.1 overs)
Avetia Mapu 15 (15); Jude Poilapa 2/15 (3 overs)		Susan Stephen 40 (34); Jane Manase 2/9 (3 overs)

Samoa won by 58 runs
Amini Park, Port Moresby
Player of the match: Susan Stephen (Van)

- Samoa won the toss and elected to bat.

8 April 2026
13:30
Scorecard

Papua New Guinea; 40 (12.1 overs)	v	Fiji; 41/6 (8.3 overs)
Krystaleigh Alu 10 (12); Ishani Singh 4/10 (3.1 overs)		Litia Lomani 8 (11); Konio Gavera 2/7 (2 overs)

ﹰFiji won by 4 wickets
Amini Park, Port Moresby
Player of the match: Ishani Singh (Fij)

- Fiji won the toss and elected to field.

9 April 2026
09:30
Scorecard

Samoa; 99/8 (20 overs)	v	Indonesia; 46 (15.5 overs)
Avetia Mapu 21 (22); Gusti Pradnya 2/9 (2 overs)		Komang Putri 16 (38); Jane Manase 2/5 (2.5 overs)

Samoa won by 53 runs
Amini Park, Port Moresby
Player of the match: Jane Manase (Sam)

- Samoa won the toss and elected to bat.

9 April 2026
13:30
Scorecard

Vanuatu; 86/5 (20 overs)	v	Papua New Guinea; 87/5 (15 overs)
Anna Griffin 32 (57); Molong Hobart 2/8 (4 overs)		Mea Loa 23 (45); Claudia Nguyen 1/6 (1 over)

Papua New Guinea won by 5 wickets
Amini Park, Port Moresby
Player of the match: Mea Loa (PNG)

- Papua New Guinea won the toss and elected to field.

10 April 2026
09:30
Scorecard

Indonesia; 120/5 (20 overs)	v	Fiji; 89/3 (20 overs)
Kadek Putri 37* (47); Ruci Taufa 2/10 (4 overs)		Ishani Singh 35* (45); Putu Cantika 2/15 (4 overs)

Indonesia won by 31 runs
Amini Park, Port Moresby
Player of the match: Putu Cantika (Idn)

- Fiji won the toss and elected to field.

11 April 2026
09:30
Scorecard

Samoa; 58 (14.3 overs)	v	Papua New Guinea; 48 (17.4 overs)
Telesia Gabriel 18 (21); Molong Hobart 4/10 (2.3 overs)		Konio Gavera 5* (12); Telesia Gabriel 4/7 (3.4 overs)

Samoa won by 10 runs
Amini Park, Port Moresby
Player of the match: Telesia Gabriel (Sam)

- Samoa won the toss and elected to bat.

11 April 2026
13:30
Scorecard

Vanuatu; 72/7 (20 overs)	v	Fiji; 73/0 (11 overs)
Susan Stephen 17 (35); Mele Waqanisau 2/13 (4 overs)		Mele Waqanisau 35* (37)

Fiji won by 10 wickets
Amini Park, Port Moresby
Player of the match: Mele Waqanisau (Fij)

- Fiji won the toss and elected to field.

12 April 2026
09:30
Scorecard

Indonesia; 93 (18.1 overs)	v	Papua New Guinea; 65/9 (20 overs)
Kadek Putri 23 (31); Konio Gavera 2/14 (4 overs)		Konio Gavera 11* (25); Putu Cantika 3/5 (3 overs)

Indonesia won by 28 runs
Amini Park, Port Moresby
Player of the match: Kadek Putri (Idn)

- Indonesia won the toss and elected to bat.

13 April 2026
09:30
Scorecard

Samoa; 130/9 (20 overs)	v	Fiji; 72 (19 overs)
Avetia Mapu 67* (62); Akosita Levaci 3/23 (4 overs)		Akosita Levaci 12 (20); Telesia Gabriel 4/19 (4 overs)

Samoa won by 58 runs
Amini Park, Port Moresby
Player of the match: Avetia Mapu (Sam)

- Samoa won the toss and elected to bat.

13 April 2026
13:30
Scorecard

Indonesia; 146/9 (20 overs)	v	Vanuatu; 68/7 (20 overs)
Hilva Noor 42 (28); Augustine Mansale 3/10 (3 overs)		Augustine Mansale 21 (31); Intan Berlian 3/8 (3 overs)

Indonesia won by 78 runs
Amini Park, Port Moresby
Player of the match: Hilva Noor (Idn)

- Vanuatu won the toss and elected to field.

== Europe ==
The European qualifier was not held and the Scotland automatically qualified for the World Cup as they were the only team in the region to fulfill the qualification pathway criteria.

== See also ==
- 2028 Under-19 Cricket World Cup qualification
