= 2025 Under-19 Women's T20 World Cup qualification =

Cricket tournament

2025 ICC Under-19 Women's T20 World Cup qualification
- Dates: 14 May – 13 November 2024
- Administrator: International Cricket Council (ICC)
- Cricket format: Limited-overs (20 overs)
- Participants: 24

The 2025 ICC Under-19 Women's T20 World Cup qualification was a series of regional qualification tournaments to determine the final five teams for the 2025 Under-19 Women's T20 World Cup. Qualification tournaments were held in Africa, Asia, East-Asia Pacific and Europe.

== Qualified teams ==
Region	Team
Africa	Nigeria
Americas	United States
Asia	Nepal
East Asia-Pacific	Samoa
Europe	Scotland

== East Asia-Pacific ==
The East Asia-Pacific qualifier was held in Indonesia from 14 to 20 May 2024. Samoa finished at the top of the table to qualify for the World Cup, becoming the first Samoan team to qualify for a Cricket World Cup in any format.

=== Points table ===
Pos	Team	Pld	W	L	NR	Pts	NRR	Qualification
1	Samoa	6	5	1	0	10	0.837	Advanced to the 2025 Under-19 Women's T20 World Cup
2	Indonesia	6	4	2	0	8	0.898	
3	Papua New Guinea	6	3	3	0	6	1.449	
4	Fiji	6	0	6	0	0	−3.574	

Source: Cricclubs

=== Fixtures ===
14 May 2024
08:30
Scorecard

Fiji; 42 (18.1 overs)	v	Indonesia; 43/2 (6.4 overs)
Jasvil Rokoro 13 (26); Hilva Noor 3/11 (3 overs)		I Gusti Pratiwi 13 (22); Abigail Raikatalau 2/9 (1 over)

Indonesia won by 8 wickets
Udayana Cricket Ground, Jimbaran
Player of the match: Hilva Noor (Idn)

- Indonesia won the toss and elected to field.

14 May 2024
12:30
Scorecard

Papua New Guinea; 123/8 (20 overs)	v	Samoa; 124/6 (19.1 overs)
Dadina Gaudi 20 (36); Masina Tafea 3/22 (4 overs)		Verra Farane 44 (31); Gabe Thomas 2/16 (4 overs)

Samoa won by 4 wickets
Udayana Cricket Ground, Jimbaran
Player of the match: Verra Farane (PNG)

- Papua New Guinea won the toss and elected to bat.

15 May 2024
08:30
Scorecard

Papua New Guinea; 171/2 (20 overs)	v	Fiji; 28 (11.1 overs)
Dika Lohia 80* (63); Mele Waqanisau 2/45 (4 overs)		Mele Waqanisau 8* (13); Gabe Thomas 3/3 (2 overs)

Papua New Guinea won by 143 runs
Udayana Cricket Ground, Jimbaran
Player of the match: Dika Lohia (PNG)

- Papua New Guinea won the toss and elected to bat.

15 May 2024
12:30
Scorecard

Indonesia; 71 (17 overs)	v	Samoa; 72/8 (18 overs)
Jeanifer Ngana 12 (30); Olive Lefaga 3/13 (4 overs)		Verra Farane 23 (28); Derni Bangi 2/10 (4 overs)

Samoa won by 2 wickets
Udayana Cricket Ground, Jimbaran
Player of the match: Olive Lefaga (Sam)

- Samoa won the toss and elected to field.

16 May 2024
08:30
Scorecard

Papua New Guinea; 58 (19.1 overs)	v	Indonesia; 59/7 (18.3 overs)
Dadina Gaudi 15 (23); Ni Murtiari 3/4 (4 overs)		Rohmalia Rohmalia 13 (30); Duna Alex 2/9 (4 overs)

Indonesia won by 3 wickets
Udayana Cricket Ground, Jimbaran
Player of the match: Ni Murtiari (Idn)

- Indonesia won the toss and elected to field.

16 May 2024
12:30
Scorecard

Samoa; 155/6 (20 overs)	v	Fiji; 84 (20 overs)
Verra Farane 79 (43); Maurea Isimeli 2/26 (4 overs)		Mele Waqanisau 19 (16); Masina Tafea 3/15 (4 overs)

Samoa won by 71 runs
Udayana Cricket Ground, Jimbaran
Player of the match: Verra Farane (Sam)

- Samoa won the toss and elected to bat.

18 May 2024
08:30
Scorecard

Fiji; 83/7 (20 overs)	v	Indonesia; 84/3 (15.3 overs)
Miliana Wati 22 (32); Intan Yofentri Penun 2/18 (4 overs)		Sandra Irianti 22* (45); Maurea Isimeli 1/18 (4 overs)

Indonesia won by 7 wickets
Udayana Cricket Ground, Jimbaran
Player of the match: Sandra Irianti (Idn)

- Fiji won the toss and elected to bat.

18 May 2024
12:30
Scorecard

Papua New Guinea; 89/4 (20 overs)	v	Samoa; 63 (17.3 overs)
Oala Kevere 39* (35); Masina Tafea 2/8 (4 overs)		Verra Farane 13 (14); Dika Lohia 3/10 (4 overs)

Papua New Guinea won by 26 runs
Udayana Cricket Ground, Jimbaran
Player of the match: Dika Lohia (PNG)

- Samoa won the toss and elected to field.

19 May 2024
08:30
Scorecard

Samoa; 81 (20 overs)	v	Indonesia; 73 (20 overs)
Angel Sootaga 24 (38); Intan Yofentri Penun 5/11 (4 overs)		Jeanifer Ngana 20 (27); Silepea Polataivao 6/15 (4 overs)

Samoa won by 8 runs
Udayana Cricket Ground, Jimbaran
Player of the match: Silepea Polataivao (Sam)

- Indonesia won the toss and elected to field.

19 May 2024
12:30
Scorecard

Papua New Guinea; 128/7 (20 overs)	v	Fiji; 79 (17.1 overs)
Lakshmi Rajadurai 35 (30); Mele Waqanisau 3/22 (4 overs)		Mele Waqanisau 43 (53); Dika Lohia 4/8 (3.1 overs)

Papua New Guinea won by 49 runs
Udayana Cricket Ground, Jimbaran
Player of the match: Mele Waqanisau (Fij)

- Papua New Guinea won the toss and elected to bat.

20 May 2024
08:30
Scorecard

Fiji; 87/7 (20 overs)	v	Samoa; 88/6 (14.2 overs)
Mele Waqanisau 38* (43); Olive Lefaga 2/7 (4 overs)		Angel Sootaga 29 (36); Mele Waqanisau 4/14 (3.2 overs)

Samoa won by 4 wickets
Udayana Cricket Ground, Jimbaran
Player of the match: Mele Waqanisau (Fij)

- Samoa won the toss and elected to field.

20 May 2024
12:30
Scorecard

Papua New Guinea; 68 (19.3 overs)	v	Indonesia; 69/5 (11.4 overs)
Lakshmi Rajadurai 15 (25); Rohmalia Rohmalia 2/7 (2 overs)		Rohmalia Rohmalia 22* (26); Dika Lohia 4/12 (3.4 overs)

Indonesia won by 5 wickets
Udayana Cricket Ground, Jimbaran
Player of the match: Rohmalia Rohmalia (Idn)

- Indonesia won the toss and elected to field.

== Europe ==
The Europe qualifier was contested as a three-match series between Netherlands and Scotland that was held from 1 to 4 August 2024 in Scotland. Scotland won the series 3–0 to secure qualification for the 2025 Under-19 Women's T20 World Cup as a result of this match.

=== 20-over series ===
==== 1st 20-over match ====
1 August 2024
14:30
Scorecard

Netherlands; 41 (15.2 overs)	v	Scotland; 42/0 (4.5 overs)
Myrthe van den Raad 10 (10); Mollie Parker 3/8 (4 overs)		Pippa Kelly 26 (21)

Scotland won by 10 wickets
Mannofield Park, Aberdeen

- Scotland won the toss and elected to field.

==== 2nd 20-over match ====
2 August 2024
14:30
Scorecard

Netherlands; 89/8 (20.0 overs)	v	Scotland; 90/4 (13.5 overs)
Carlijn Van Koolwijk 26 (23); Kirsty McColl 3/24 (3 overs)		Pippa Sproul 29 (27); Carlijn Van Koolwijk 2/12 (2 overs)

Scotland won by 6 wickets
Mannofield Park, Aberdeen

- Netherlands won the toss and elected to bat.

==== 3rd 20-over match ====
4 August 2024
14:30
Scorecard

Scotland; 144/3 (20 overs)	v	Netherlands; 80/7 (20 overs)
Emma Walsingham 73* (49); Ana Wijffels 2/19 (4 overs)		Rosalie Lawrence 22 (38); Ammy Baldie 3/9 (4 overs)

Scotland won by 64 runs
Mannofield Park, Aberdeen

- Netherlands won the toss and elected to field.

== Americas ==
For the second tournament in succession, the qualifier was scratched and the United States of America automatically qualified for the World Cup as they were the only team in the region to fulfill the qualification pathway criteria.

== Africa ==
The Africa qualifier was divided into two divisions with Division 2 held from 21st to 27th August in Kigali, Rwanda. A total of 7 women's Under-19 teams from the region competed against each other in a single round-robin format following which the top two teams (Kenya and Malawi) of the Division 2 tournament advanced to the main Africa qualifier. The participating teams in Division 2 were the Under-19 women's teams from Botswana, Eswatini, Kenya, Lesotho, Malawi, Mozambique and Sierra Leone. The top two teams from the Division 2 qualifier (Kenya and Malawi) joined the under 19 women's teams from Namibia, Nigeria, Rwanda, Tanzania, Uganda and Zimbabwe in the Division 1 tournament.

Division 2	Division 1	
Division 2	Group A	Group B
Botswana; Eswatini; Kenya; Lesotho; Malawi; Mozambique; Sierra Leone	Kenya; Namibia; Rwanda; Uganda	Malawi; Nigeria; Tanzania; Zimbabwe

=== Division 2 ===
==== Points table ====
Pos	Team	Pld	W	L	NR	Pts	NRR	Qualification
1	Malawi	6	6	0	0	12	4.632	Advanced to Division 1
2	Kenya	6	5	1	0	10	5.749	Advanced to Division 1
3	Sierra Leone	6	4	2	0	8	2.232	
4	Botswana	6	3	3	0	6	−1.011	
5	Mozambique	6	2	4	0	4	−1.730	
6	Eswatini	6	1	5	0	2	−5.158	
7	Lesotho	6	0	6	0	0	−5.522	

Source: Cricheroes

==== Fixtures ====
21 August 2024
09:30
Scorecard

Eswatini; 26 (10.5 overs)	v	Malawi; 27/1 (3.1 overs)
Shabalala Lihle 4 (7); Evah Kabwere 6/5 (4 overs)		Mercy Kudimba 14* (11); Lindokuhle Mamba 1/17 (2 overs)

Malawi won by 9 wickets
Gahanga International Cricket Stadium, Kigali
Player of the match: Evah Kabwere (Maw)

- Malawi won the toss and elected to field.

21 August 2024
09:30
Scorecard

Mozambique; 106/8 (20 overs)	v	Botswana; 107/5 (18.3 overs)
Amelia Mundundo 51 (46); Lesego Koogile 3/19 (4 overs)		Oratile Tsimako 25* (20); Delerosa Navingo 3/18 (4 overs)

Botswana won by 5 wickets
Gahanga B Ground, Kigali
Player of the match: Lesego Koogile (Bot)

- Mozambique won the toss and elected to bat.

21 August 2024
13:50
Scorecard

Kenya; 247/2 (20 overs)	v	Lesotho; 33 (18.1 overs)
Melvin Khagoitsa 96* (51); Tshowana Ntobo 1/54 (4 overs)		Boitumel Tlali 5 (13); Stella Idagiza 3/3 (4 overs)

Kenya won by 214 runs
Gahanga International Cricket Stadium, Kigali
Player of the match: Melvin Khagoitsa (Ken)

- Kenya won the toss and elected to bat.

21 August 2024
13:50
Scorecard

Sierra Leone; 76/8 (20 overs)	v	Malawi; 80/2 (10 overs)
Fatu Conteh 30 (26); Alinafe Alfonso 1/3 (1 over)		Mercy Kudimba 36* (31); Isatu Sah 1/15 (3 overs)

Malawi won by 8 wickets
Gahanga B Ground, Kigali
Player of the match: Mercy Kudimba (Maw)

- Malawi won the toss and elected to field.

22 August 2024
09:30
Scorecard

Mozambique; 158/5 (20 overs)	v	Eswatini; 73 (15.2 overs)
Wisley Bucuane 49* (54); Mamba Kendokuhle 2/23 (4 overs)		Sithole Temazikodze 9 (16); Delerosa Navingo 3/6 (3 overs)

Mozambique won by 85 runs
Gahanga International Cricket Stadium, Kigali
Player of the match: Delerosa Navingo (Moz)

- Eswatini won the toss and elected to field.

22 August 2024
09:30
Scorecard

Botswana; 133/0 (20 overs)	v	Lesotho; 44/7 (20 overs)
Mercy Dipogiso 52* (60)		Lerato Mating 11 (42); Lame Rasina 3/5 (2 overs)

Botswana won by 89 runs
Gahanga B Ground, Kigali
Player of the match: Mercy Dipogiso (Bot)

- Lesotho won the toss and elected to field.

22 August 2024
13:50
Scorecard

Kenya; 126/5 (20 overs)	v	Sierra Leone; 106/6 (20 overs)
Janet Makau 44* (50); Alice Fillie 2/33 (4 overs)		Emma Kamara 31 (25); Melvin Khagoitsa 2/15 (4 overs)

Kenya won by 20 runs
Gahanga International Cricket Stadium, Kigali
Player of the match: Melvin Khagoitsa (Ken)

- Kenya won the toss and elected to bat.

22 August 2024
13:50
Scorecard

Mozambique; 25 (13 overs)	v	Malawi; 26/0 (4.1 overs)
Wisley Bucuane 7 (5); Lucy Malino 3/6 (4 overs)		Euless Chilarile 13* (17)

Malawi won by 10 wickets
Gahanga B Ground, Kigali
Player of the match: Lucy Malino (Maw)

- Mozambique won the toss and elected to bat.

24 August 2024
09:30
Scorecard

Kenya; 170/3 (20 overs)	v	Botswana; 35 (15.1 overs)
Melvin Khagoitsa 98* (59); Segaba Keganne 1/18 (4 overs)		Celeste Aaron 6 (29); Janet Makau 3/2 (3 overs)

Kenya won by 135 runs
Gahanga International Cricket Stadium, Kigali
Player of the match: Melvin Khagoitsa (Ken)

- Botswana won the toss and elected to field.

24 August 2024
09:30
Scorecard

Eswatini; 33 (16 overs)	v	Sierra Leone; 34/1 (2.4 overs)
Sithole Temazikodze 4 (11); Emma Kamara 3/11 (4 overs)		Emma Kamara 15* (14)

Sierra Leone won by 9 wickets
Gahanga B Ground, Kigali
Umpires: Nimali Perera (SL) and Justine Muzungu (Bot)
Player of the match: Emma Kamara (Sle)

- Sierra Leone won the toss and elected to field.

24 August 2024
13:50
Scorecard

Malawi; 155/5 (20 overs)	v	Botswana; 52 (18.2 overs)
Mercy Kudimba 88* (56); Lesego Kooagile 2/21 (4 overs)		Lesego Kooagile 11* (28); Evah Kabwere 3/14 (4 overs)

Malawi won by 103 runs
Gahanga International Cricket Stadium, Kigali

- Botswana won the toss and elected to field.

24 August 2024
13:50
Scorecard

Mozambique; 73 (19 overs)	v	Lesotho; 51 (19.2 overs)
Amelia Mundundo 11 (11); Lintle Mohloai 3/12 (4 overs)		Tshowana Ntobo 5 (14); Leonar Mandhate 3/10 (4 overs)

Mozambique won by 22 runs
Gahanga B Ground, Kigali
Player of the match: Yudney Murrure (Moz)

- Mozambique won the toss and elected to bat.

26 August 2024
09:30
Scorecard

Malawi; 171/7 (20 overs)	v	Lesotho; 17 (9.2 overs)
Febbe Malefula 77 (50); Boitumel Tlali 2/17 (4 overs)		Lintle Mohloai 4* (8); Esther Richard 5/4 (4 overs)

Malawi won by 154 runs
Gahanga International Cricket Stadium, Kigali
Player of the match: Esther Richard (Maw)

- Malawi won the toss and elected to bat.

26 August 2024
09:30
Scorecard

Botswana; 139/5 (20 overs)	v	Eswatini; 65 (19.1 overs)
Oratile Tsimako 33 (33); Simelane Lulama 2/17 (3 overs)		Sithole Temazikodze 17 (28); Lesego Kooagile 3/12 (4 overs)

Botswana won by 74 runs
Gahanga B Ground, Kigali
Player of the match: Lesego Kooagile (Bot)

- Botswana won the toss and elected to bat.

26 August 2024
13:50
Scorecard

Kenya; 215/2 (20 overs)	v	Mozambique; 71/5 (20 overs)
Kreeshna Mehta 116* (69); Yudney Murrure 1/35 (4 overs)		Amelia Mundundo 23 (37); Roshele Atamba 1/8 (2 overs)

Kenya won by 144 runs
Gahanga International Cricket Stadium, Kigali
Player of the match: Kreeshna Mehta (Ken)

- Kenya won the toss and elected to bat.
- Kreeshna Mehta 116* (69) scored her first century in Under-19 Women's T20Is.

26 August 2024
13:50
Scorecard

Sierra Leone; 151/1 (20 overs)	v	Lesotho; 54/5 (20 overs)
Emma Kamara 66 (61); Lindiwe Polaki 1/28 (4 overs)		Lerato Mating 20 (46); Emma Kamara 1/0 (4 overs)

Sierra Leone won by 97 runs
Gahanga B Ground, Kigali
Player of the match: Emma Kamara (Sle)

- Sierra Leone won the toss and elected to bat.

27 August 2024
09:30
Scorecard

Kenya; 194/6 (20 overs)	v	Eswatini; 14 (7.3 overs)
Kreeshna Mehta 93 (67); Dlamini Owami 1/27 (3 overs); Tsabedze Nomazwi 1/27 (3 overs)		Sithole Temazikodze 6 (13); Melvin Khagoitsa 7/3 (3.3 overs)

Kenya won by 180 runs
Gahanga International Cricket Stadium, Kigali
Player of the match: Melvin Khagoitsa (Ken)

- Kenya won the toss and elected to bat.

27 August 2024
09:30
Scorecard

Botswana; 64/5 (20 overs)	v	Sierra Leone; 65/3 (10.2 overs)
Amantle Letuba 20 (28); Susan Sesay 4/12 4 overs)		Emma Kamara 47* (38); Segaba Keganne 1/10 (4 overs)

Sierra Leone won by 7 wickets
Gahanga B Ground, Kigali
Player of the match: Susan Sesay (Sle)

- Botswana won the toss and elected to bat.

27 August 2024
13:50
Scorecard

Lesotho; 50/8 (20 overs)	v	Eswatini; 54/4 (11.3 overs)
Reabetsoe Matilda 3 (9); Mkhonta Nomphilo 2/11 (3 overs)		Shabalala Lihle 33* (27); Matseliso Setintana 2/1 (1 over)

Eswatini won by 6 wickets
Gahanga International Cricket Stadium, Kigali
Player of the match: Dlamini Owami (Esw)

- Lesotho won the toss and elected to bat.

27 August 2024
13:50
Scorecard

Kenya; 109/8 (20 overs)	v	Malawi; 110/8 (19.2 overs)
Melvin Khagoitsa 56 (37); Evah Kabwere 3/20 (4 overs)		Ketrina Chingaipe 28* (23); Stella Idagiza 5/14 (4 overs)

Malawi won by 2 wickets
Gahanga B Ground, Kigali
Player of the match: Ketrina Chingaipe (Maw)

- Kenya won the toss and elected to bat.

27 August 2024
13:50
Scorecard

Sierra Leone; 157/5 (20 overs)	v	Mozambique; 88/9 (18.3 overs)
Emma Kamara 108* (74); Leonar Mandhate 2/20 (4 overs)		Wisley Bucuane 37 (29); Mariama Jalloh 3/17 (4 overs)

Sierra Leone won by 69 runs
Integrated Polytechnic Regional College Ground, Kigali
Umpires: John Mayeku (Ken) and Isaac Oyieko (Rwa)
Player of the match: Emma Kamara (Sle)

- Sierra Leone won the toss and elected to bat.
- Emma Kamara 108* (74) scored her first century in Under-19 Women's T20Is.

=== Division 1 ===
The top two teams from the Division 2 qualifier (Kenya and Malawi) joined the under 19 women's teams from Namibia, Nigeria, Rwanda, Tanzania, Uganda and Zimbabwe in the Division 1 tournament which was held from 22-29 September 2024.

Group A	Group B
Kenya; Namibia; Rwanda; Uganda	Malawi; Nigeria; Tanzania; Zimbabwe

==== Group A ====
Pos	Team	Pld	W	L	NR	Pts	NRR	Qualification
1	Uganda	3	3	0	0	6	2.760	Advanced to the semi-finals
2	Rwanda	3	2	1	0	4	0.400	Advanced to the semi-finals
3	Namibia	3	1	2	0	2	−0.620	Advanced to the 5th place play-off
4	Kenya	3	0	3	0	0	−2.659	Advanced to the 7th place play-off

Source: CricHeroes

==== Fixtures ====
22 September 2024
09:30
Scorecard

Rwanda; 95/8 (20 overs)	v	Kenya; 37 (13.1 overs)
Shakila Niyomuhoza 29 (35); Janet Nthenya 2/17 (4 overs)		Melvin Khagoitsa 7 (12); Ruth Uwimana 3/6 (3 overs)

Rwanda won by 58 runs
Gahanga B Ground, Kigali
Player of the match: Ruth Uwimana (Rwa)

- Kenya won the toss and elected to field.

22 September 2024
13:50
Scorecard

Uganda; 128/6 (20 overs)	v	Namibia; 79 (17.5 overs)
Malisa Ariokot 27 (26); Mekelaye Mwatile 2/27 (4 overs)		Mekelaye Mwatile 28 (35); Lorna Anyait 3/14 (3.5 overs)

Uganda won by 49 runs
Gahanga B Ground, Kigali
Player of the match: Patricia Timong (Uga)

- Uganda won the toss and elected to bat.

23 September 2024
09:30
Scorecard

Kenya; 37 (13.5 overs)	v	Uganda; 41/1 (8.1 overs)
Zainab Hamisi 15 (26); Lonah Anyait 7/6 (3 overs)		Patricia Timong 14* (30); Janet Nthenya 1/13 (3 overs)

Uganda won by 9 wickets
Integrated Polytechnic Regional College Ground, Kigali
Player of the match: Lonah Anyait (Uga)

- Kenya won the toss and elected to bat.

23 September 2024
13:50
Scorecard

Namibia; 101/8 (20 overs)	v	Rwanda; 102/3 (17.3 overs)
Mekelaye Mwatile 33 (28); Sonia Umuringa 3/18 (4 overs)		Rosette Shimwamana 37* (52); Leigh-Marie Visser 1/6 (1 over)

Rwanda won by 7 wickets
Integrated Polytechnic Regional College Ground, Kigali
Player of the match: Sonia Umuringa (Rwa)

- Namibia won the toss and elected to bat.

25 September 2024
09:30
Scorecard

Namibia; 147/5 (20 overs)	v	Kenya; 119/6 (20 overs)
Engela Van Der Merwe 70* (56); Kreeshna Mehta 2/26 (4 overs)		Zainab Hamisi 48* (48); Unombuiro Kaanjosa 3/24 (4 overs)

Namibia won by 28 runs
Integrated Polytechnic Regional College Ground, Kigali
Player of the match: Engela Van Der Merwe (Nam)

- Namibia won the toss and elected to bat.

25 September 2024
13:50
Scorecard

Uganda; 102 (19.3 overs)	v	Rwanda; 56 (19.4 overs)
Mallsa Arlokot 33 (24); Grace Mugwaneza 4/14 (4 overs)		Shakila Niyomuhoza 10 (20); Patricia Apolot 2/6 (1.4 overs)

Uganda won by 46 runs
Integrated Polytechnic Regional College Ground, Kigali
Player of the match: Asumin Akurut (Uga)

- Rwanda won the toss and elected to field.

==== Group B ====
Pos	Team	Pld	W	L	NR	Pts	NRR	Qualification
1	Nigeria	3	3	0	0	6	1.812	Advanced to the semi-finals
2	Zimbabwe	3	2	1	0	4	2.600	Advanced to the semi-finals
3	Tanzania	3	1	2	0	2	−0.255	Advanced to the 5th place play-off
4	Malawi	3	0	3	0	0	−4.117	Advanced to the 7th place play-off

Source: CricHeroes

==== Fixtures ====
22 September 2024
09:30
Scorecard

Zimbabwe; 195/2 (20 overs)	v	Malawi; 51 (13 overs)
Beloved Biza 86 (57); Evah Kabwere 1/48 (4 overs)		Mercy Kudimba 21 (37); Beloved Biza 5/5 (2 overs)

Zimbabwe won by 144 runs
Integrated Polytechnic Regional College Ground, Kigali
Player of the match: Beloved Biza (Zim)

- Malawi won the toss and elected to field.

22 September 2024
13:50
Scorecard

Tanzania; 108/8 (20 overs)	v	Nigeria; 111/6 (16.5 overs)
Jenipher Kimari 64 (60); Lillian Udeh 5/12 (3 overs)		Victory Igbinedion 24 (20); Jenipher Kimari 3/17 (3 overs)

Nigeria won by 4 wickets
Integrated Polytechnic Regional College Ground, Kigali
Player of the match: Lillian Udeh (Nig)

- Tanzania won the toss and elected to bat.

23 September 2024
09:30
Scorecard

Tanzania; 86 (17.4 overs)	v	Malawi; 69/9 (20 overs)
Agnes Qwele 39 (32); Alinafe Alfonso 3/10 (2.4 overs)		Febbe Malefula 17 (25); Jenipher Kimari 2/14 (4 overs)

Tanzania won by 17 runs
Gahanga B Ground, Kigali
Player of the match: Agnes Qwele (Tan)

- Malawi won the toss and elected to field.

23 September 2024
13:50
Scorecard

Zimbabwe; 77 (19.4 overs)	v	Nigeria; 78/9 (20 overs)
Beloved Biza 33 (36); Anointed Akhigbe 3/2 (1.4 overs)		Omosigho Eguakun 15 (20); Runyararo Pasipanodya 2/8 (2 overs)

Nigeria won by 1 wicket
Gahanga B Ground, Kigali
Player of the match: Lilian Udeh (Nig)

- Zimbabwe won the toss and elected to bat.

25 September 2024
09:30
Scorecard

Nigeria; 147/4 (20 overs)	v	Malawi; 61 (18.1 overs)
Victory Igbinedion 66 (72); Evah Kabwere 2/25 (4 overs)		Esther Richard 11 (16); Lucky Piety 2/5 (3 overs)

Nigeria won by 86 runs
Gahanga B Ground, Kigali
Player of the match: Lucky Piety (Nig)

- Nigeria won the toss and elected to bat.

25 September 2024
13:50
Scorecard

Zimbabwe; 113/7 (20 overs)	v	Tanzania; 100/9 (20 overs)
Runyararo Pasipanodya 35 (39); Lightness Eladius 2/16 (4 overs)		Jenipher Kimari 47 (45); Chipo Moyo 2/6 (3 overs)

Zimbabwe won by 13 runs
Gahanga B Ground, Kigali
Player of the match: Chipo Moyo (Zim)

- Zimbabwe won the toss and elected to bat.

==== 7th place play-off ====
26 September 2024
13:50
Scorecard

Kenya; 70 (20 overs)	v	Malawi; 74/3 (15.4 overs)
Zainabu Hamisi 24 (36); Christina Bwanali 4/13 (4 overs)		Euless Chilarile 27 (39); Janet Makau 1/15 (3 overs)

Malawi won by 7 wickets
Integrated Polytechnic Regional College Ground, Kigali
Umpires: Christina Bwanali (Maw)

- Malawi won the toss and elected to field.

==== 5th place play-off ====
26 September 2024
13:50
Scorecard

Namibia; 82 (19.1 overs)	v	Tanzania; 83/4 (15.3 overs)
Mekelaye Mwatile 51 (65); Agnes Kwele 4/9 (4 overs)		Jenipher Kimari 28 (26); Veronika Tobias 1/3 (0.3 overs)

Tanzania won by 6 wickets
Gahanga B Ground, Kigali
Player of the match: Agnes Kwele (Tan)

- Namibia won the toss and elected to bat.

==== Semi-final 1 ====
28 September 2024
13:50
Scorecard

Zimbabwe; 138/7 (20 overs)	v	Uganda; 63 (19.2 overs)
Lorraine Pemhiwa 35* (27); Irene Mutonyi 2/6 (3 overs)		Immaculate Nandera 24 (30); Runyararo Pasipanodya 2/0 (0.2 overs)

Zimbabwe won by 75 runs
Gahanga B Ground, Kigali
Player of the match: Beloved Biza (Zim)

- Zimbabwe won the toss and elected to bat.

==== Semi-final 2 ====
28 September 2024
13:50
Scorecard

Nigeria; 126/4 (20 overs)	v	Rwanda; 64 (18.4 overs)
Victory Igbinedion 59* (61); Rosette Shimwamana 2/14 (4 overs)		Mukamusoni Anifa 18 (31); Annointed Akhigbe 4/1 (2.4 overs)

Nigeria won by 62 runs
Integrated Polytechnic Regional College Ground, Kigali
Player of the match: Annointed Akhigbe (Nga)

- Nigeria won the toss and elected to bat.

==== 3rd place play-off ====
29 September 2024
09:30
Scorecard

Uganda; 71 (19.4 overs)	v	Rwanda; 72/7 (19.5 overs)
Patricia Timong 19 (30); Umukundwa Nasira 2/8 (4 overs)		Utagushimaninde Fanny 25 (46); Mischelle Ariago 2/7 (2.5 overs)

Rwanda won by 3 wickets
Gahanga B Ground, Kigali
Player of the match: Shimwamana Rosette (Rwa)

- Uganda won the toss and elected to bat.

==== The Final ====
29 September 2024
13:50
Scorecard

Nigeria; 77/8 (20 overs)	v	Zimbabwe; 19/1 (2.3 overs)
Victory Igbinedion 23 (18); Runyararo Pasipanodya 2/5 (2 overs)		Kelis Ndhlovu 8* (6); Usen Peace 1/0 (0.3 overs)

No result
Gahanga B Ground, Kigali

- Nigeria won the toss and elected to bat.
- Rain prevented any further play.
- Nigeria qualified for the 2025 Under-19 Women's T20 World Cup as a result of finishing above Zimbabwe in group stage.

== Asia ==
The Asia qualifier was held in the United Arab Emirates from 6-13 November 2024, where teams from Kuwait, Nepal, Thailand and hosts United Arab Emirates played each other in a double round-robin format.

=== Squads ===
Kuwait	Nepal	Thailand	United Arab Emirates
Zeefa Jilani (c); Ziniya Afroz; Amanpreet; Ayesha Iqbal; Khadija Jahir; Sarrah Jasvi; Candice Jerica; Khadija Khalil; Raelyn Maria; Fiona Melvo; Eshanvi Mohan (wk); Swatiba Parmar; Ameesha Ram; Pearl Simon	Puja Mahato (c); Trishana BK; Rachana Chaudhary; Sabitra Dhami (wk); Kusum Godar; Krishma Gurung; Seema KC; Sneha Mahara; Jyotsnika Marasani; Sonu Pakhrin; Sana Praveen; Riya Sharma; Manisha Upadhayay; Alisha Yadav (wk)	Aphisara Suwanchonrath (c); Sunisa Bongkodphongampai; Phichamon Darajaroen (wk); Kesinee Kaewjumphol; Saithan Khanthachai; Chanoknan Phanao; Phatthanan Phinkaeo (wk); Arrikan Phuengkho; Kewarin Saechao; Charukan Saema; Koranit Suwanchonrathi; Yanathip Takunsi (wk); Saranrat Thaonanthasathian; Nattharika Thokoi	Samaira Dharnidharka (c); Al Maseera Jahangir; Ananya Pravin Keny; Lavanya Keny; Neha Kumari; Ayushi Mahesh; Indhuja Nandakumar; Malavika Rajeev; Rinitha Rajith; Rishitha Rajith; Avanee Sunil Patil; Ameya Santosh; Mehak Thakur; Emily Thomas (wk)

=== Points table ===
Pos	Team	Pld	W	L	T	NR	Pts	NRR	Qualification
1	Nepal	6	5	1	0	0	10	3.935	Advanced to the 2025 Under-19 Women's T20 World Cup and 2024 ACC Women's Under-19 T20 Asia Cup
2	United Arab Emirates	6	5	1	0	0	10	3.740	
3	Thailand	6	2	4	0	0	4	−1.653	
4	Kuwait	6	0	6	0	0	0	−5.725	

Source: Cricclubs

=== Fixtures ===
6 November 2024
09:30
Scorecard

United Arab Emirates; 143/1 (20 overs)	v	Kuwait; 37 (15.2 overs)
Lavanya Keny 77* (57); Zeefa Jilani 1/17 (4 overs)		Zeefa Jilani 9 (11); Mehak Thakur 2/2 (3 overs)

United Arab Emirates won by 106 runs
The Sevens Stadium, Dubai
Umpires: Narayanan Janani (Ind) and Shiju Sam (UAE)
Player of the match: Lavanya Keny (UAE)

- United Arab Emirates won the toss and elected to bat.

6 November 2024
13:30
Scorecard

Nepal; 102/6 (20 overs)	v	Thailand; 35 (11.4 overs)
Puja Mahato 35 (40); Charukan Saema 2/20 (4 overs)		Aphisara Suwanchonrathi 13 (23); Rachana Chaudhary 4/10 (3 overs)

Nepal won by 67 runs
The Sevens Stadium, Dubai
Umpires: Shathira Jakir (Ban) and Shiju Sam (UAE)
Player of the match: Puja Mahato (Nep)

- Thailand won the toss and elected to field.

7 November 2024
09:30
Scorecard

Nepal; 130/8 (20 overs)	v	Kuwait; 22 (13 overs)
Puja Mahato 34 (38); Ayesha Iqbal Pewekar 2/12 (4 overs)		Zeefa Jilani 12 (17); Seema KC 2/0 (2 overs)

Nepal won by 108 runs
The Sevens Stadium, Dubai
Umpires: Shathira Jakir (Ban) and Narayanan Janani (Ind)
Player of the match: Puja Mahato (Nep)

- Nepal won the toss and elected to bat.

7 November 2024
13:30
Scorecard

United Arab Emirates; 155/2 (20 overs)	v	Thailand; 81 (20 overs)
Rinitha Rajith 54* (28); Kesinee Kaewjumphol 2/24 (3 overs)		Aphisara Suwanchonrath 24 (26); Mehak Thakur 2/7 (3 overs)

United Arab Emirates won by 74 runs
The Sevens Stadium, Dubai
Umpires: Narayanan Janani (Ind) and Shiju Sam (UAE)
Player of the match: Rinitha Rajith (UAE)

- United Arab Emirates won the toss and elected to bat.

9 November 2024
09:30
Scorecard

United Arab Emirates; 122/7 (20 overs)	v	Nepal; 109/5 (20 overs)
Rinitha Rajith 48 (33); Riya Sharma 3/15 (4 overs)		Puja Mahato 48 (43); Lavanya Keny 1/14 (4 overs)

United Arab Emirates won by 13 runs
The Sevens Stadium, Dubai
Umpires: Shathira Jakir (Ban) and Shiju Sam (UAE)
Player of the match: Rinitha Rajith (UAE)

- United Arab Emirates won the toss and elected to bat.

9 November 2024
13:30
Scorecard

Thailand; 128/7 (20 overs)	v	Kuwait; 108/4 (20 overs)
Nattharika Thokoi 38 (41); Ayesha Iqbal 3/15 (4 overs)		Zeefa Jilani 73* (49); Charukan Saema 2/16 (3 overs)

Thailand won by 20 runs
The Sevens Stadium, Dubai
Umpires: Shathira Jakir (Ban) and Hemangi Yerzal (UAE)
Player of the match: Nattharika Thokoi (Tha)

- Thailand won the toss and elected to bat

10 November 2024
09:30
Scorecard

United Arab Emirates; 211/2 (20 overs)	v	Kuwait; 27/8 (20 overs)
Lavanya Keny 99* (67); Candice Dias 1/27 (3 overs)		Ayesha Iqbal 11 (29); Mehak Thakur 2/1 (4 overs)

United Arab Emirates won by 184 runs
The Sevens Stadium, Dubai
Umpires: Shathira Jakir (Ban) and Shiju Sam (UAE)
Player of the match: Lavanya Keny (UAE)

- United Arab Emirates won the toss and elected to bat.

10 November 2024
13:30
Scorecard

Nepal; 139/9 (20 overs)	v	Thailand; 33 (16 overs)
Sana Praveen 53 (46); Nattharika Thokoi 3/31 (4 overs)		Koranit Suwanchonrathi 6 (11); Kusum Godar 3/9 (4 overs)

Nepal won by 106 runs
The Sevens Stadium, Dubai
Umpires: Shiju Sam (UAE) and Hemangi Yerzal (UAE)
Player of the match: Kusum Godar (Nep)

- Nepal won the toss and elected to bat

12 November 2024
09:30
Scorecard

Nepal; 213/2 (20 overs)	v	Kuwait; 48 (13 overs)
Puja Mahato 130* (69); Zeefa Zilani 1/29 (4 overs)		Zeefa Zilani 36(42); Puja Mahato 5/8 (4 overs)

Nepal won by 165 runs
The Sevens Stadium, Dubai
Umpires: Shathira Jakir (Ban) and Hemangi Yerzal (UAE)
Player of the match: Puja Mahato (Nep)

- Nepal won the toss and elected to bat
- Puja Mahato scored her first century and took her first five wicket hauls in Under-19 Women's T20Is.

12 November 2024
13:30
Scorecard

Thailand; 55 (19.4 overs)	v	United Arab Emirates; 56/1 (7.1 overs)
Aphisara Suwanchonrathi 20 (29); Lavanya Keny 4/4 (4 overs)		Lavanya Keny 27* (21); Aphisara Suwanchonrathi 1/16 (2 overs)

United Arab Emirates won by 9 wickets
The Sevens Stadium, Dubai
Umpires: Shiju Sam (UAE) and Hemangi Yerzal (UAE)
Player of the match: Lavanya Keny (UAE)

- Thailand won the toss and elected to bat.

13 November 2024
09:30
Scorecard

Thailand; 165/1 (20 overs)	v	Kuwait; 61/4 (20 overs)
Arrikan Phuengkho 84* (63); Candice Dias 1/30 (4 overs)		Zeefa Jilani 23 (16); Koranit Suwanchonrathi 2/8 (4 overs)

Thailand won by 104 runs
The Sevens Stadium, Dubai
Umpires: Shiju Sam (UAE) and Shathira Jakir (BAN)
Player of the match: Arrikan Phuengkho (Tha)

- Thailand won the toss and elected to bat.

13 November 2024
13:30
Scorecard

United Arab Emirates; 83/9 (20 overs)	v	Nepal; 86/2 (14.4 overs)
Samaira Dharnidharka 31 (48); Krishma Gurung 4/17 (4 overs)		Sana Praveen 35* (42); Mehak Thakur 2/27 (4 overs)

Nepal won by 8 wickets
The Sevens Stadium, Dubai
Umpires: Shathira Jakir (Ban) and Hemangi Yerzal (UAE)
Player of the match: Krishma Gurung (Nep)

- United Arab Emirates won the toss and elected to bat.
- Nepal qualified for the 2025 Under-19 Women's T20 World Cup as a result of finishing first in points table.
- Nepal also qualified for the 2024 ACC Women's Under-19 T20 Asia Cup.
