= Botswana women's national under-19 cricket team =

Under-19 cricket team

Botswana Women's Under-19 cricket team
- Association: Botswana Cricket Association (BCA)

Personnel
- Captain: Amantle Letuba
- Coach: Reginald Nehonde

History
- Twenty20 debut: v. Sierra Leone at Botswana Cricket Association Oval, Gaborone, Botswana; 3 September 2022

International Cricket Council
- ICC status: Associate member (2005)
- ICC region: Africa

The Botswana women's under-19 cricket team represents Botswana in international under-19 women's cricket. The team is administered by the Botswana Cricket Association (BCA).

The side played for the first time in the Africa Qualifier for the 2023 Under-19 Women's T20 World Cup.

== History ==
The inaugural Women's Under-19 World Cup was scheduled to take place in January 2021, but was postponed multiple times due to the COVID-19 pandemic. The tournament was eventually held in January 2023, in South Africa.

== Current squad ==
The following squad were announced for the 2025 ICC Under-19 Women's T20 World Cup qualification.

As of 5 July 2023

No	Player	Playing role	Date of birth
1	Amantle Letuba	Batter	30 December 2012
2	Oratile Tsimako	Allrounder	5 June 2006
3	Mercy Dipogiso	Batter	18 March 2007
4	Aliya Motorwala	Batter	25 November 2006
5	Celeste Aaron	Batter	8 May 2006
6	Tlhalefo Godisamanga	Allrounder	29 September 2007
7	Entle Mmese	Batter	3 January 2006
8	Lesego Kooagile	Bowler	7 July 2007
9	Keotshepile Kearialo	Bowler	5 January 2007
10	Lame Rasina	Bowler	22 November 2006
11	Segaba Keganne	Bowler	21 April 2007

== Records & statistics ==
International match summary

As of 27 August 2024

Playing records
Format	M	W	L	T	D/NR	Inaugural match
Youth Women's Twenty20 Internationals	9	4	5	0	0	3 September 2022

As of 27 August 2024

Records against other national sides
Associate members
Opponent	M	W	L	T	NR	First match	First win
Sierra Leone	2	0	2	0	0	3 September 2022	
Namibia	1	1	0	0	0	4 September 2022	4 September 2022
Uganda	1	0	1	0	0	6 September 2022	
Mozambique	1	1	0	0	0	21 August 2024	21 August 2024
Lesotho	1	1	0	0	0	22 August 2024	22 August 2024
Kenya	1	0	1	0	0	24 August 2024	
Malawi	1	0	1	0	0	24 August 2024	
Eswatini	1	1	0	0	0	26 August 2024	26 August 2024

== Tournament history ==
=== ICC Under-19 Women's World Cup records ===
Botswana's Under-19 Twenty20 World Cup Record
Year	Result	Pos	№	Pld	W	L	T	NR
(South Africa) 2023	Did not qualify							
(Malaysia) (Thailand) 2025	Did not qualify							
(Bangladesh) (Nepal) 2027	To be determined							
Total				0	0	0	0	0

=== ICC Under-19 Women's World Cup qualifiers records ===
Botswana's Under-19 World Cup Qualifiers Cup Record
Year	Result	Pos	№	Pld	W	L	T	NR
(Botswana) 2022	Round-robin	3/4	4	3	1	2	0	0
(Rwanda) 2024	Round-robin	4/7	7	6	3	3	0	0
Total	2/2			9	4	5	0	0
