= Uganda women's national under-19 cricket team =

Under-19 women's cricket team

Uganda Women's Under-19 cricket team
- Nickname: Baby Victoria Pearls
- Association: Uganda Cricket Association (UCA)

Personnel
- Captain: Jimla Muhamed
- Coach: Yusuf Nanga

History
- Twenty20 debut: v. Namibia at Botswana Cricket Association Oval, Gaborone, Botswana; 3 September 2022

International Cricket Council
- ICC status: Associate member (1998; 28 years ago)
- ICC region: Africa Cricket Association (ACA)

The Uganda women's under-19 cricket team represents Uganda in international under-19 women's cricket. The team is administered by the Uganda Cricket Association (UCA). The side played for the first time in the Africa Qualifier for the 2023 Under-19 Women's T20 World Cup.

== History ==
The inaugural Women's Under-19 World Cup was scheduled to take place in January 2021, but was postponed multiple times due to the COVID-19 pandemic. The tournament was eventually held in January 2023, in South Africa.

== Current squad ==
The following squad was announced for the recently finished 2025 ICC Under-19 Women's T20 World Cup qualification.

As of 5 July 2024

No	Player	Playing role	Date of birth
1	Jimla Muhamed (Captain)	All Rounder	Could not be found on any website
2	Patricia Timong	All Rounder	31 October 2007
3	Asumin Akurut	All Rounder	2 October 2007
4	Mallsa Arlokot	Bowler	Could not be found any website
5	Immaculate Nandera (Vice-Captain)	Bowler	5 May 2007
6	Gilingish Nabulime	Batter	Could not be found on any website
7	Naome Amongin	All Rounder	Could not be found on any website
8	Lonah Anyait	Wicketkeeper Batter	Could not be found on any website
9	Rashidah Tikabula	Bowler	Could not be found on any website
10	Irene Mutonyi	All Rounder	10 October 2008
11	Patricia Apolot	Bowler	Could not be found on any website

== Records & statistics ==
International match summary

As of 28 August 2024

Playing records
Format	M	W	L	T	D/NR	Inaugural match
Youth Women's Twenty20 Internationals	10	6	4	0	0	3 September 2022

=== Records against other national sides ===
As of 28 August 2024

Associate members
Opponent	M	W	L	T	NR	First match	First win
Botswana	1	1	0	0	0	6 September 2022	6 September 2022
Sierra Leone	1	1	0	0	0	4 September 2022	4 September 2022
Namibia	3	2	1	0	0	3 September 2022	3 September 2022
Rwanda	3	1	2	0	0	10 September 2022	25 September 2024
Kenya	1	1	0	0	0	23 September 2024	23 September 2024
Zimbabwe	1	0	1	0	0	28 August 2024	

== Tournament history ==
=== ICC Under-19 Women's World Cup ===
ICC Women's Under-19 T20 World Cup records
Year	Round	Position	GP	W	L	T	NR
(South Africa) 2023	Did not qualify						
(Malaysia) 2025	Did not qualify						
(Bangladesh) (Nepal) 2027	To be determined						
Total	0/2	–	0	0	0	0	0

=== ICC Under-19 Women's World Cup Africa qualifiers ===
ICC Under-19 Women's World Cup Africa qualifiers records
Year	Round	Position	GP	W	L	T	NR
(Botswana) 2023	DNQ	–	5	3	2	0	0
(Rwanda) 2025	DNQ	–	5	3	2	0	0
2027	To be determined						
Total	2/2	–	10	6	4	0	0
