= Fiji women's national under-19 cricket team =

Under-19 cricket team

Fiji Women's Under-19 cricket team
- Association: Cricket Fiji (CA)

Personnel
- Captain: Mele Waqanisau
- Coach: Sanjiv Dubey

History
- Twenty20 debut: v. Indonesia at Udayana Cricket Ground, Bali, Indonesia; 14 May 2024

International Cricket Council
- ICC status: Associate member (1965)
- ICC region: East Asia-Pacific (EAP)

The Fiji women's national under-19 cricket team represents Fiji in international under-19 women's cricket. The team is administered by Cricket Fiji (CA).

== History ==
The side played for the first time in the East Asia-Pacific Qualifier for the 2025 Under-19 Women's T20 World Cup.

== Current squad ==
The following squad were announced recently finished 2025 ICC Under-19 Women's T20 World Cup qualification.

As of 5 July 2024

| No | Player | Playing role | Date of birth |
|---|---|---|---|
| 1 | Mele Waqanisau (Captain) | Right hand bat/Right arm fast medium | 26 October 2007 |
| 2 | Neimara Hazelman | Right hand bat/Right arm offbreak | 29 September 2007 |
| 3 | Jasvil Rokoro | Right hand bat/Right arm off spin | 5 February 2009 |
| 4 | Kijiana Silivia | Right hand bat/Right arm fast medium | 6 November 2005 |
| 5 | Akosita Poulter | Right hand bat | 10 February 2007 |
| 6 | Mereseini Meke | Right hand bat/Wicketkeeper | 30 May 2006 |
| 7 | Miliana Wati | Left hand bat | 9 March 2006 |
| 8 | Litia Lala | Right hand bat/Right arm medium fast | 11 May 2005 |
| 9 | Maurea Isimeli | Right arm medium fast | 3 November 2006 |
| 10 | Abigail Raikatalau | Right arm medium fast | 15 September 2006 |
| 11 | Manu Mauitoga | Right hand bat/Right arm medium fast | 26 January 2006 |

== Records & statistics ==
International match summary

As of 20 May 2024

Playing records
| Format | M | W | L | T | D/NR | Inaugural match |
| Youth Women's Twenty20 Internationals | 6 | 0 | 6 | 0 | 0 | 14 May 2024 |

=== Records against other national sides ===
As of 20 May 2024

Associate members
| Opponent | M | W | L | T | NR | First match | First win |
| Indonesia | 2 | 0 | 2 | 0 | 0 | 14 May 2024 | |
| Papua New Guinea | 2 | 0 | 2 | 0 | 0 | 15 May 2024 | |
| Samoa | 2 | 0 | 2 | 0 | 0 | 16 May 2024 | |

== Tournament history ==
=== ICC Under-19 Women's World Cup ===
ICC Women's Under-19 T20 World Cup records
| Year | Round | Position | GP | W | L | T | NR |
|---|---|---|---|---|---|---|---|
| (South Africa) 2023 | Did not qualify | | | | | | |
| (Malaysia) 2025 | Did not qualify | | | | | | |
| (Bangladesh) (Nepal) 2027 | To be determined | | | | | | |
| Total | 0/2 | – | 0 | 0 | 0 | 0 | 0 |

=== ICC Under-19 Women's World Cup East Asia Pacific qualifiers ===
ICC Under-19 Women's World Cup East Asia Pacific qualifiers records
| Year | Round | Position | GP | W | L | T | NR |
|---|---|---|---|---|---|---|---|
| (Indonesia) 2023 | Did not participate | | | | | | |
| (Indonesia) 2025 | DNQ | – | 6 | 0 | 6 | 0 | 0 |
| 2027 | To be determined | | | | | | |
| Total | 1/2 | – | 6 | 0 | 6 | 0 | 0 |
