= Papua New Guinea women's national under-19 cricket team =

Under-19 cricket team

Papua New Guinea Women's Under-19 cricket team
- Nickname: Siales
- Association: Cricket PNG

Personnel
- Captain: Melanie Ani
- Coach: Kath Hempenstall

History
- Twenty20 debut: v. Indonesia at Udayana Cricket Ground, Bali, Indonesia; 3 July 2022

International Cricket Council
- ICC region: East Asia-Pacific (EAP)

The Papua New Guinea women's national under-19 cricket team represents Papua New Guinea in international under-19 women's cricket. The team is administered by Cricket PNG.

== Records & statistics ==
International match summary

As of 20 May 2024

Playing records
Format	M	W	L	T	D/NR	Inaugural match
Youth Women's Twenty20 Internationals	6	0	6	0	0	14 May 2024

=== Records against other national sides ===
As of 20 May 2024

Associate members
Opponent	M	W	L	T	NR	First match	First win
Indonesia	3	1	2	0	0	3 July 2022	4 July 2022
Fiji	2	0	2	0	0	15 May 2024	
Samoa	2	0	2	0	0	16 May 2024	

== Tournament history ==
=== ICC Under-19 Women's World Cup ===
ICC Women's Under-19 T20 World Cup records
Year	Round	Position	GP	W	L	T	NR
(South Africa) 2023	Did not qualify						
(Malaysia) 2025	Did not qualify						
(Bangladesh) (Nepal) 2027	To be determined						
Total	0/2	–	0	0	0	0	0

=== ICC Under-19 Women's World Cup East Asia Pacific qualifiers ===
ICC Under-19 Women's World Cup East Asia Pacific qualifiers records
Year	Round	Position	GP	W	L	T	NR
(Indonesia) 2023	Did not participate						
(Indonesia) 2025	DNQ	–	6	0	6	0	0
2027	To be determined						
Total	1/2	–	6	0	6	0	0

== History ==
The side played for the first time in the East Asia-Pacific Qualifier for the 2023 ICC Under-19 Women's T20 World Cup, in a three-match series against Indonesia. They lost the series 2–1. They missed out on securing a T20 World Cup spot after falling short by just three runs in the final match of the series.
