= Cameroon Cricket Federation =

Governing body of cricket in Cameroon

- Sport: Cricket
- Jurisdiction: Cameroon
- Founded: 2005
- Affiliation: International Cricket Council
- Affiliation date: 2007
- Regional affiliation: Africa
- Location: Yaounde, Cameroon

Official website
- www.facebook.com/Cameroon-Cricket-Federation-Fecacricket-1890549164493544
- (Cameroon)

The Cameroon Cricket Federation (French: Fédération camerounaise de cricket; FECACRICKET) is the official governing body of the sport of cricket in Cameroon since 15 February 2005 and operates Cameroon national cricket teams. Cameroon Cricket Federation is Cameroon's representative at the International Cricket Council and is an affiliate member and has been a member of that body since 2007. It is also a member of the Africa Cricket Association. In 2017, it became an associate member of the ICC.

== History ==
Cricket was introduced to Cameroon in the 1990s by the Commonwealth Students and Youth Development Organisation. The Cameroon Cricket Outreach Program was established in 2004 and the national federation was established the following year. Development efforts began in the capital city Yaoundé and have since expanded to other regions.

== See also ==
- Cameroon national cricket team
- Cameroon women's national cricket team
- Cameroon women's national under-19 cricket team
