= Netherlands women's national under-19 cricket team =

Under-19 cricket team

Netherlands Women's Under-19 cricket team
- Association: Royal Dutch Cricket Association

Personnel
- Captain: Ana Wijffels

International Cricket Council
- ICC region: Europe

The Netherlands women's under-19 cricket team represents Netherlands in international under-19 women's cricket. The team is administrated by Royal Dutch Cricket Association.

The Netherlands failed to qualify for the inaugural ICC Under-19 Women's T20 World Cup via the Europe Qualifier, losing a three-match series against Scotland 0–3.

The side played for the second time in the Europe Qualifier for the 2025 Under-19 Women's T20 World Cup.

== History ==
The inaugural Women's Under-19 World Cup was scheduled to take place in January 2021, but was postponed multiple times due to the COVID-19 pandemic. The tournament eventually took place in January 2023, in South Africa. Netherlands competed in the Europe Qualifier for the tournament in August 2022, which consisted of a three-match series against the Scotland. They lose all three of the matches to failed qualify for the 2023 Under-19 World Cup.

The Second Women's Under-19 World Cup was scheduled to take place in January 2025, in Malaysia. Netherlands competed in the Europe Qualifier for the tournament in August 2024, which consisted of a three-match series against the Scotland. They lose all three of the matches to failed qualify for the 2025 ICC Under-19 Women's T20 World Cup.
