= Kuwait women's national under-19 cricket team =

Under-19 cricket team

Kuwait Women's Under-19 cricket team
- Association: Cricket Kuwait

Personnel
- Captain: Zeefa Jilani
- Coach: Tariq Rasool

History
- Twenty20 debut: v. United Arab Emirates at The Sevens Stadium, Dubai; 6 November 2024

International Cricket Council
- ICC region: ACC (Asia)

The Kuwait women's national under-19 cricket team represents Kuwait in international under-19 women's cricket. The team is administered by Cricket Kuwait (CK).

The side played for the first time in the 2025 Under-19 Women's T20 World Cup Asia Qualifier for the 2025 Under-19 Women's T20 World Cup.

== Squads ==
- Zeefa Jilani (c)
- Fiona Melvo
- Raelyn Maria
- Candice Jerica
- Eshanvi Mohan
- Ayesha Iqbal
- Ziniya Afroz
- Ameesha Ram
- Amanpreet
- Khadija Khalil
- Khadija Jahir
- Sarrah Jasvi
- Swatiba Parmar
- Pearl Simon

== Staff ==
- Tariq Rasool - Head Coach
- Qasim Ali - Manager
- Khadija Sheikh - Assistant Coach

== Records & statistics ==
International match summary

As of 7 November 2024

Playing records
Format	M	W	L	T	D/NR	W %	Inaugural match
Youth Women's Twenty20 Internationals	2	0	2	0	0	00.00%	6 November 2024

Youth Women's Twenty20 record versus other nations

As of 7 November 2024

Opponent	M	W	L	T	NR	W%	First match	First win
Associate Members
Nepal	2	0	2	0	0	00.00%	7 November 2024	
United Arab Emirates	1	0	1	0	0	00.00%	6 November 2024	

== Under-19 World Cup record ==
Kuwait's Under-19 Twenty20 World Cup Record
Year	Result	Pos	№	Pld	W	L	T	NR
(South Africa) 2023	Did not qualify							
(Malaysia) 2025	Did not qualify							
(Bangladesh) (Nepal) 2027	To be determined							
Total				0	0	0	0	0

== Under-19 Women's Asia Cup record ==
Kuwait's Under-19 Twenty20 Asia Cup Record
Year	Result	Pos	№	Pld	W	L	T	NR
(Malaysia) 2024	Didn't qualified							
Total				0	0	0	0	0
