= Eswatini Cricket Association =

Sports governing body in Eswatini

The ECA logo

The old logo of the Swazi Cricket Association

Eswatini Cricket Association is the official governing body of the sport of cricket in Eswatini (formerly known as Swaziland). The association is Eswatini's representative at the International Cricket Council and is an associate member and has been a member of that body since 2007. It is also a member of the African Cricket Association.

== See also ==
- Eswatini national cricket team
- Eswatini women's national cricket team
- Eswatini national under-19 cricket team
- Eswatini women's national under-19 cricket team
