= Lakshmi Rajadurai =

Papua New Guinean cricketer

Personal information
- Full name: Lakshmi Kila Rajadurai
- Born: 6 January 2009 (age 17)
- Batting: Right-handed
- Bowling: Right-arm off spin

International information
- National side: Papua New Guinea
- ODI debut (cap 4): 24 March 2024 v Zimbabwe
- Last ODI: 19 October 2025 v United Arab Emirates(UAE)
- T20I debut (cap 28): 16 June 2025 v Vanuatu
- Last T20I: 21 June 2025 v Samoa
- Source: Cricinfo, 7 October 2024

Lakshmi Kila Rajadurai (born 6 January 2009) is a Papua New Guinean cricketer. In March 2024, she was named in Papua New Guinea's squad for the Zimbabwean tour, which included Papua New Guinea's first ever Women's ODI matches. She made her ODI debut on 24 March 2024.

== Background ==
Lakshmi's father Kuhaseelan Rajadurai is from Sri Lanka while her mother Karo Rigolo is from Kaparoko in Rigo District. Her father Kuhaseelan is an accountant while her mother is a casual worker who performs charities. Kuhaseelan, originally from Sri Lanka, has been staying in Papua New Guinea since 1982. He played for POM team in Papua New Guinean domestic cricket and served as National Treasurer of Cricket PNG from 2005 to 2014. Kuhaseelan is a life member of Cricket PNG.

She began playing from the age of 7 in boys only competitions. She studies at Hills Sports High School in Sydney and represents New South Wales in Combined High Schools cricket. She was also selected for Sydney West cricket team.

== Career ==
At the age of 10, Rajadurai got selected to play for New South Wales Under-13 team, and was later selected to play for their Under-15 team. She went on to play for the Parramatta Women's Grade Cricket Club in the Brewer Shield in Sydney. She was the leading wicket-taker in the Under-16 Australian Female National Championships in 2024, with 15 wickets at an average of 8.33. In December 2023, she played for Papua New Guinea Under-23s in the Australian National Women's Under-19 Championships. Cricket New South Wales were extremely supportive in her aspirations to play for Papua New Guinea.

On 24 March 2024, she made her ODI debut against Zimbabwe at the age of 15, becoming the youngest Papua New Guinean women's cricketer to play for the national team.
