= Cameroon women's national under-19 cricket team =

Under-19 cricket team

Cameroon Women's Under-19 cricket team
- Association: Cameroon Cricket Federation

International Cricket Council
- ICC region: Africa

The Cameroon women's under-19 cricket team represents Cameroon in international under-19 women's cricket. The team is administered by the Cameroon Cricket Federation.

The side played for the first time in the Africa Qualifier for the 2027 Under-19 Women's T20 World Cup.
