= Eswatini women's national under-19 cricket team =

Under-19 cricket team

Eswatini Women's Under-19 cricket team
- Association: Eswatini Cricket Association

International Cricket Council
- ICC region: Africa

The Eswatini women's under-19 cricket team represents Eswatini in international under-19 women's cricket. The team is administered by the Eswatini Cricket Association.

The side played for the first time in the Africa Qualifier for the 2025 Under-19 Women's T20 World Cup.

== History ==
The inaugural Women's Under-19 World Cup was scheduled to take place in January 2021, but was postponed multiple times due to the COVID-19 pandemic. The tournament eventually took place in January 2023, in South Africa.
