= Scotland women's national under-19 cricket team =

Under-19 cricket team

Scotland Women's Under-19 cricket team
- Association: Cricket Scotland

Personnel
- Captain: Katherine Fraser
- Coach: Peter Ross

History
- Twenty20 debut: v. United Arab Emirates at Willowmoore Park, Benoni, South Africa; 14 January 2023
- U19 World Cup wins: 0

International Cricket Council
- ICC region: Europe
- Official website: www.cricketscotland.com

The Scotland women's under-19 cricket team represents Scotland in international under-19 women's cricket. The team is administrated by Cricket Scotland (CS).

Scotland qualified for the inaugural ICC Under-19 Women's T20 World Cup via winning the Europe Qualifier, winning a three-match series against the Netherlands 3–0. They were eliminated in the first group stage at the tournament.

== History ==
The inaugural Women's Under-19 World Cup was scheduled to take place in January 2021, but was postponed multiple times due to the COVID-19 pandemic. The tournament eventually take place in January 2023, in South Africa. Scotland competed in the Europe Qualifier for the tournament in August 2022, which consisted of a three-match series against the Netherlands. They won all three of the matches to qualify for the 2023 Under-19 World Cup.

Scotland announced their squad for the tournament on 12 December 2022, with Peter Ross announced as Head Coach of the side. At the tournament, they lost all three of their matches in the first group stage, although they did beat the United States in a subsequent play-off.

== Recent call-ups ==
The table below lists all the players who have been selected in recent squads for Scotland under-19s. Currently, this only includes the squad for the 2023 ICC Under-19 Women's T20 World Cup.

Name	Most Recent Call-up
Molly Barbour-Smith	2023 World Cup (withdrawn)
Olivia Bell	2023 World Cup
Darcey Carter	2023 World Cup
Maryam Faisal	2023 World Cup
Katherine Fraser	2023 World Cup
Ailsa Lister	2023 World Cup
Maisie Maceira	2023 World Cup
Kirsty MacColl	2023 World Cup
Orla Montgomery	2023 World Cup
Niamh Muir	2023 World Cup
Molly Paton	2023 World Cup
Niamh Robertson-Jack	2023 World Cup
Nayma Sheikh	2023 World Cup
Anne Sturgess	2023 World Cup
Emily Tucker	2023 World Cup
Emma Walsingham	2023 World Cup

== Records ==
International match summary

As of 20 January 2023

Playing records
Format	M	W	L	T	D/NR	Inaugural match
Youth Women's Twenty20 Internationals	4	1	3	0	0	14 January 2023

Youth Women's Twenty20 record versus other nations

As of 20 January 2023

ICC Full members
Opponent	M	W	L	T	NR	First match	First win
India	1	0	1	0	0	18 January 2023	
South Africa	1	0	1	0	0	14 January 2023	

Associate members
Opponent	M	W	L	T	NR	First match	First win
United Arab Emirates	1	0	1	0	0	16 January 2023	
United States	1	1	0	0	0	20 January 2023	20 January 2023

== Under-19 World Cup record ==
Scotland U19 World Cup Record
Year	Result	Pos	№	Pld	W	L	T	NR
(South Africa) 2023	Fourth-Place Play-offs	–	16	4	1	3	0	0
Total				4	1	3	0	0
