= Lesotho Cricket Association =

Governing body of cricket in Lesotho

Lesotho Cricket Association is the official governing body of the sport of cricket in Lesotho and operates Lesotho national cricket team. Its current headquarters is in Teyateyaneng, Lesotho. Lesotho Cricket Association is Lesotho's representative at the International Cricket Council and is an associate member and has been a member of that body since 2001. It is also a member of the African Cricket Association.

In 2019, the LCA entered into a partnership with the Free State Cricket Union from the neighbouring South African province, to assist with developing youth cricket in Lesotho.
