= Cricket PNG =

Governing body of cricket in Papua New Guinea

- Cricket PNG logo
- Sport: Cricket
- Jurisdiction: Papua New Guinea
- Abbreviation: CPNG
- Founded: 1972
- Affiliation: International Cricket Council
- Affiliation date: 1973
- Regional affiliation: ICC East Asia-Pacific
- Affiliation date: 1996
- Headquarters: Port Moresby
- Chairperson: Helen Macindoe
- CEO: Greg Campbell

Official website
- cricketpng.org.pg
- (Papua New Guinea)

Cricket PNG, originally founded as the Papua New Guinea Cricket Board of Control, is the official governing body of the sport of cricket in Papua New Guinea. Its current headquarters is in Port Moresby. Cricket PNG was founded in 1972 and was became an Associate Member of the International Cricket Council on 24 July 1973. It is also a Member of the East Asia-Pacific Cricket Council.

In July 2020, Cricket PNG won the Gray-Nicolls Participation Programme of the Year award, in the ICC's Annual Development Awards to recognise developing cricketing nations.

== History ==
Cricket in Papua New Guinea was initially fractured with different regions having different associations. In 1971, the Papua New Guinea Cricket Board of Control started to unify all the PNG associations thought the Rabaul Cricket Association refused to engage. The PNGCBC pushed ahead regardless to negotiate with Marylebone Cricket Club for a formal constitution and for them to be recognised as the governing body for cricket in PNG. They formally became a member of the ICC in 1973.

In the 2010s, with former Kent and England wicketkeeper Geraint Jones playing for them, as he was born in PNG, PNG gained One Day International status and won their first two ODIs. They subsequently lost ODI status after finishing in the bottom two of the 2018 Cricket World Cup Qualifier.

In July 2020, Cricket PNG won the Gray-Nicolls Participation Programme of the Year award, in the ICC's Annual Development Awards to recognise developing cricketing nations.

== Home ground ==
- Amini Park is a cricket ground in Port Moresby, Papua New Guinea.

The ground is named for the Amini family, several of whose members have played cricket for Papua New Guinea (both the men's and women's teams). The ground has seen the men's team play Australia, the West Indies and Victoria. The women's team played Japan in a three-match series at the ground in September 2006.

== See also ==
- PNG national cricket team
- PNG women's national cricket team
- Papua New Guinea national under-19 cricket team
- PNG women's national under-19 cricket team
