= 2023 Under-19 Women's T20 World Cup qualification =

Cricket tournament

2023 ICC Under-19 Women's T20 World Cup qualification
- Dates: 1 June – 12 September 2022
- Administrator: International Cricket Council (ICC)
- Cricket format: Limited-overs (20 overs)
- Participants: 20

The 2023 ICC Under-19 Women's T20 World Cup qualification were a series of regional qualification tournaments to determine the final five places at the 2023 ICC Under-19 Women's T20 World Cup. Qualification tournaments were held in Africa, Asia, East-Asia Pacific and Europe.

== Qualified teams ==
| Region | Team |
|---|---|
| Africa | Rwanda |
| Americas | United States |
| Asia | United Arab Emirates |
| East Asia-Pacific | Indonesia |
| Europe | Scotland |

== Americas ==
The Americas region qualifier was scratched and the United States qualified automatically as they were the only ICC associate member in the region who met the ICC's Event Pathway Participation Criteria.

== Asia ==
The Asian qualifier was hosted by Malaysia between 3–9 June 2022. Thailand and United Arab Emirates were undefeated going into their final round-robin match. The UAE defeated Thailand by six wickets to qualify for the World Cup, the first for a UAE women's team.

=== Points table ===
| Pos | Team | Pld | W | L | NR | Pts | NRR |
|---|---|---|---|---|---|---|---|
| 1 | United Arab Emirates | 5 | 5 | 0 | 0 | 10 | 5.798 |
| 2 | Thailand | 5 | 4 | 1 | 0 | 8 | 3.237 |
| 3 | Nepal | 5 | 3 | 2 | 0 | 6 | 0.173 |
| 4 | Malaysia | 5 | 2 | 3 | 0 | 4 | −1.318 |
| 5 | Qatar | 5 | 1 | 4 | 0 | 2 | −2.505 |
| 6 | Bhutan | 5 | 0 | 5 | 0 | 0 | −4.514 |

Source: ESPNcricinfo

Advanced to the 2023 ICC Under-19 Women's T20 World Cup

=== Fixtures ===
3 June 2022
09:30
Scorecard

| Thailand; 133/4 (20 overs) | v | Malaysia; 48 (13.4 overs) |
| Thipatcha Putthawong 32 (32); Elsa Hunter 2/23 (4 overs) | | Dhanusri Muhunan 9 (13); Nanthita Boonsukham 5/9 (3.4 overs) |

Thailand won by 85 runs
Kinrara Academy Oval, Bandar Kinrara
Umpires: Shivani Mishra (Qat) and Vrinda Rathi (Ind)

- Thailand won the toss and elected to bat.

3 June 2022
09:30
Scorecard

| Nepal; 117/3 (20 overs) | v | Qatar; 38 (15.4 overs) |
| Ashma Pulami Magar 32* (39); Saachi Dhadwal 1/17 (4 overs) | | Saachi Dhadwal 14 (27); Shristi Jaisi 3/5 (4 overs) |

Nepal won by 79 runs
UKM-YSD Cricket Oval, Bangi
Umpires: Viswanadan Kalidas (Mas) and Sarika Prasad (Sin)

- Nepal won the toss and elected to bat.

3 June 2022
13:15
Scorecard

| United Arab Emirates; 202/1 (20 overs) | v | Bhutan; 42/7 (20 overs) |
| Theertha Satish 94 (64); Chencho Dema 1/33 (2 overs) | | Ngawang Choden 8 (28); Rishitha Rajith 2/2 (2 overs) |

United Arab Emirates won by 160 runs
Kinrara Academy Oval, Bandar Kinrara
Umpires: Narayanan Janani (Ind) and Shivani Mishra (Qat)

- United Arab Emirates won the toss and elected to bat.

4 June 2022
09:30
Scorecard

| Malaysia; 115/7 (20 overs) | v | Qatar; 88/3 (20 overs) |
| Elsa Hunter 42 (38); Sarrinah Ahmed 3/8 (3 overs) | | Saachi Dhadwal 26 (36) |

Malaysia won by 27 runs
Kinrara Academy Oval, Bandar Kinrara
Umpires: Tabarak Dar (HK) and Viswanadan Kalidas (Mas)

- Qatar won the toss and elected to field.

4 June 2022
13:15
Scorecard

| Thailand; 182/3 (20 overs) | v | Bhutan; 52/8 (20 overs) |
| Banthida Leephatthana 73* (58); Sonam 2/28 (4 overs) | | Sonam 12 (32); Nanthita Boonsukham 3/19 (4 overs) |

Thailand won by 130 runs
Kinrara Academy Oval, Bandar Kinrara
Umpires: Tabarak Dar (HK) and Vrinda Rathi (Ind)

- Thailand won the toss and elected to bat.

4 June 2022
13:15
Scorecard

| Nepal; 8 (8.1 overs) | v | United Arab Emirates; 9/0 (1.1 overs) |
| Sneha Mahara 3 (10); Mahika Gaur 5/2 (4 overs) | | Theertha Satish 4* (4) |

United Arab Emirates won by 10 wickets
UKM-YSD Cricket Oval, Bangi
Umpires: Narayanan Janani (Ind) and Shivani Mishra (Qat)

- Nepal won the toss and elected to bat.

6 June 2022
09:30
Scorecard

| Thailand; 128/6 (20 overs) | v | Qatar; 59/8 (20 overs) |
| Sunida Chaturongrattana 31 (32); Tafaul El Nour 2/20 (4 overs) | | Saachi Dhadwal 29 (59); Pornnapha Saehoe 4/5 (4 overs) |

Thailand won by 69 runs
Kinrara Academy Oval, Bandar Kinrara
Umpires: Tabarak Dar (HK) and Viswanadan Kalidas (Mas)

- Thailand won the toss and elected to bat.

6 June 2022
09:30
Scorecard

| Malaysia; 33/9 (20 overs) | v | United Arab Emirates; 34/1 (4 overs) |
| Nurul Athirah 11 (22); Mahika Gaur 4/4 (4 overs) | | Lavanya Keny 13* (12); Nur Dania Syuhada 1/10 (2 overs) |

United Arab Emirates won by 9 wickets
UKM-YSD Cricket Oval, Bangi
Umpires: Shivani Mishra (Qat) and Vrinda Rathi (Ind)

- United Arab Emirates won the toss and elected to field.

6 June 2022
13:15
Scorecard

| Bhutan; 66/9 (20 overs) | v | Nepal; 67/6 (13.1 overs) |
| Ngawang Choden 11 (14); Manisha Upadhayay 2/3 (4 overs) | | Sanu Rajbanshi 30* (32); Sangay Wangmo 3/22 (4 overs) |

Nepal won by 4 wickets
Kinrara Academy Oval, Bandar Kinrara
Umpires: Tabarak Dar (HK) and Sarika Prasad (Sin)

- Bhutan won the toss and elected to bat.

7 June 2022
09:30
Scorecard

| Qatar; 49/8 (20 overs) | v | United Arab Emirates; 52/0 (5.4 overs) |
| Aleena Khan 17 (27); Archara Supriya 5/2 (4 overs) | | Theertha Satish 34* (20) |

United Arab Emirates won by 10 wickets
Kinrara Academy Oval, Bandar Kinrara
Umpires: Narayanan Janani (Ind) and Vrinda Rathi (Ind)

- Qatar won the toss and elected to bat.

7 June 2022
13:15
Scorecard

| Bhutan; 87/5 (20 overs) | v | Malaysia; 88/2 (11.2 overs) |
| Ngawang Choden 23 (26); Nur Dania Syuhada 2/4 (4 overs) | | Elsa Hunter 37* (24); Chado Om 1/12 (2 overs) |

Malaysia won by 8 wickets
Kinrara Academy Oval, Bandar Kinrara
Umpires: Tabarak Dar (HK) and Narayanan Janani (Ind)

- Malaysia won the toss and elected to field.

7 June 2022
13:15
Scorecard

| Thailand; 89/7 (20 overs) | v | Nepal; 40 (19.5 overs) |
| Thipatcha Putthawong 20 (31); Manisha Upadhayay 2/14 (4 overs) | | Shristi Jaisi 7* (21); Nanthita Boonsukham 3/9 (4 overs) |

Thailand won by 49 runs
UKM-YSD Cricket Oval, Bangi
Umpires: Viswanadan Kalidas (Mas) and Sarika Prasad (Sin)

- Nepal won the toss and elected to field.

9 June 2022
09:30
Scorecard

| Nepal; 86/7 (20 overs) | v | Malaysia; 61/4 (20 overs) |
| Anjali Bishowkarma 33 (54); Nur Dania Syuhada 2/14 (4 overs) | | Elsa Hunter 28 (32); Kritika Marasini 2/6 (4 overs) |

Nepal won by 25 runs
UKM-YSD Cricket Oval, Bangi
Umpires: Tabarak Dar (HK) and Vrinda Rathi (Ind)

- Nepal won the toss and elected to bat.

9 June 2022
09:30
Scorecard

| Bhutan; 114/9 (20 overs) | v | Qatar; 115/3 (16 overs) |
| Ngawang Choden 27 (21); Aleena Khan 3/8 (4 overs) | | Shrutiben Rana 49 (47); Sonam 1/18 (3 overs) |

Qatar won by 7 wickets
Kinrara Academy Oval, Bandar Kinrara
Umpires: Viswanadan Kalidas (Mas) and Shivani Mishra (Qat)

- Qatar won the toss and elected to field.

9 June 2022
13:15
Scorecard

| Thailand; 84/8 (20 overs) | v | United Arab Emirates; 85/4 (17.1 overs) |
| Phannita Maya 40 (39); Mahika Gaur 2/11 (4 overs) | | Theertha Satish 38* (38); Thipatcha Putthawong 2/21 (4 overs) |

United Arab Emirates won by 6 wickets
Kinrara Academy Oval, Bandar Kinrara
Umpires: Viswanadan Kalidas (Mas) and Shivani Mishra (Qat)

- Thailand won the toss and elected to bat.

== East Asia-Pacific ==
The East Asia-Pacific qualifier was hosted by Indonesia from 3–5 July 2022.

As Indonesia and Papua New Guinea were the only teams participating, the qualifier was scheduled as a three-match series. Indonesia won the series 2–1 and thus qualified for the 2023 ICC Under-19 Women's T20 World Cup, the first time any cricket team from Indonesia has made it to a World Cup.

=== Match list ===
3 July 2022
Scorecard

| Indonesia; 105/9 (20 overs) | v | Papua New Guinea; 68 (17.3 overs) |

Indonesia won by 37 runs
Udayana Cricket Ground, Jimbaran

4 July 2022
Scorecard

| Indonesia; 69/9 (20 overs) | v | Papua New Guinea; 72/6 (18.5 overs) |

Papua New Guinea won by 4 wickets
Udayana Cricket Ground, Jimbaran

5 July 2022
Scorecard

| Indonesia; 89/8 (20 overs) | v | Papua New Guinea; 87 (19.2 overs) |

Indonesia won by 2 runs
Udayana Cricket Ground, Jimbaran

== Europe ==
The Europe qualifier was a three-match series between Netherlands and Scotland, hosted by the former from 9–11 August 2022. Scotland won the series 3–0 to secure qualification for the Under-19 World Cup.

=== Match list ===
9 August 2022
Scorecard

| Scotland; 135/6 (20 overs) | v | Netherlands; 78 (19.2 overs) |

Scotland won by 57 runs
Sportpark Maarschalkerweerd, Utrecht

10 August 2022
Scorecard

| Netherlands; 94/7 (20 overs) | v | Scotland; 95/1 (8.1 overs) |

Scotland won by 9 wickets
Sportpark Maarschalkerweerd, Utrecht

11 August 2022
Scorecard

| Scotland; 223/2 (20 overs) | v | Netherlands; 100/7 (20 overs) |

Scotland won by 123 runs
Sportpark Maarschalkerweerd, Utrecht

== Africa ==
The Africa regional qualifier was hosted by Botswana in September 2022. The participating teams were Botswana, Malawi, Mozambique, Namibia, Nigeria, Rwanda, Sierra Leone, Tanzania and Uganda. Rwanda won the qualifier by defeating Tanzania in the final by six wickets, becoming the first Rwanda team to qualify for a Cricket World Cup in any format.

=== Group One ===
| Team | Pld | W | L | T | A | NRR | Pts |
|---|---|---|---|---|---|---|---|
| Uganda (Q) | 3 | 3 | 0 | 0 | 0 | +3.072 | 6 |
| Namibia (Q) | 3 | 2 | 1 | 0 | 0 | +2.995 | 4 |
| Botswana | 3 | 1 | 2 | 0 | 0 | –4.570 | 2 |
| Sierra Leone | 3 | 0 | 3 | 0 | 0 | –1.452 | 0 |

3 September 2022
Scorecard

| Namibia; 85/5 (20 overs) | v | Uganda; 87/6 (17.3 overs) |

Uganda won by 4 wickets
Botswana Cricket Association Oval 2, Gaborone

3 September 2022
Scorecard

| Sierra Leone; 98 (18 overs) | v | Botswana; 100/9 (18.5 overs) |

Botswana won by 1 wicket
Botswana Cricket Association Oval 1, Gaborone

4 September 2022
Scorecard

| Namibia; 191/4 (20 overs) | v | Botswana; 54/9 (20 overs) |

Namibia won by 137 runs
Botswana Cricket Association Oval 1, Gaborone

4 September 2022
Scorecard

| Uganda; 107/4 (20 overs) | v | Sierra Leone; 84/5 (20 overs) |

Uganda won by 23 runs
Botswana Cricket Association Oval 2, Gaborone

6 September 2022
Scorecard

| Namibia; 151/5 (20 overs) | v | Sierra Leone; 96/8 (20 overs) |

Namibia won by 55 runs
Botswana Cricket Association Oval 2, Gaborone

6 September 2022
Scorecard

| Uganda; 181/3 (20 overs) | v | Botswana; 38/8 (20 overs) |

Uganda won by 143 runs
Botswana Cricket Association Oval 1, Gaborone

=== Group Two ===
| Team | Pld | W | L | T | A | NRR | Pts |
|---|---|---|---|---|---|---|---|
| Tanzania (Q) | 4 | 4 | 0 | 0 | 0 | +4.321 | 8 |
| Rwanda (Q) | 4 | 3 | 1 | 0 | 0 | +4.700 | 6 |
| Nigeria | 4 | 2 | 2 | 0 | 0 | +1.027 | 4 |
| Malawi | 4 | 1 | 3 | 0 | 0 | –4.092 | 2 |
| Mozambique | 4 | 0 | 4 | 0 | 0 | –8.632 | 0 |

3 September 2022
Scorecard

| Rwanda; 79 (17.3 overs) | v | Nigeria; 70 (16.5 overs) |

Rwanda won by 9 runs
Botswana Cricket Association Oval 1, Gaborone

3 September 2022
Scorecard

| Mozambique; 19 (8.4 overs) | v | Tanzania; 20/1 (2 overs) |

Tanzania won by 9 wickets
Botswana Cricket Association Oval 2, Gaborone

4 September 2022
Scorecard

| Mozambique; 81 (20 overs) | v | Malawi; 83/2 (11 overs) |

Malawi won by 8 wickets
Botswana Cricket Association Oval 2, Gaborone

4 September 2022
Scorecard

| Tanzania; 174/3 (20 overs) | v | Nigeria; 59 (19 overs) |

Tanzania won by 115 runs
Botswana Cricket Association Oval 1, Gaborone

6 September 2022
Scorecard

| Mozambique; 46 (13.3 overs) | v | Nigeria; 47/1 (4.3 overs) |

Nigeria won by 9 wickets
Botswana Cricket Association Oval 2, Gaborone

6 September 2022
Scorecard

| Rwanda; 187/5 (20 overs) | v | Malawi; 42 (17 overs) |

Rwanda won by 145 runs
Botswana Cricket Association Oval 1, Gaborone

7 September 2022
Scorecard

| Tanzania; 141/8 (20 overs) | v | Malawi; 43 (19.3 overs) |

Tanzania won by 98 runs
Botswana Cricket Association Oval 1, Gaborone

7 September 2022
Scorecard

| Rwanda; 259/2 (20 overs) | v | Mozambique; 36 (12.3 overs) |

Rwanda won by 223 runs
Botswana Cricket Association Oval 1, Gaborone

9 September 2022
Scorecard

| Nigeria; 191/7 (20 overs) | v | Malawi; 74 (18.5 overs) |

Nigeria won by 117 runs
Botswana Cricket Association Oval 2, Gaborone

9 September 2022
Scorecard

| Tanzania; 115 (19.1 overs) | v | Rwanda; 114/6 (20 overs) |

Tanzania won by 1 run
Botswana Cricket Association Oval 1, Gaborone

=== Semi-finals ===
10 September 2022
Scorecard

| Namibia; 107/8 (20 overs) | v | Tanzania; 111/4 (18.5 overs) |
| Engela van der Merwe 28 (30); Agnes Qwele 3/9 (4 overs) | | Agnes Qwele 47* (49); Naomi Benjamin 3/8 (4 overs) |

Tanzania won by 6 wickets
Botswana Cricket Association Oval 1, Gaborone

- Namibia won the toss and elected to bat.

10 September 2022
Scorecard

| Rwanda; 97/6 (20 overs) | v | Uganda; 41 (20 overs) |
| Henriette Ishimwe 36 (45); Lorna Anyait 2/6 (4 overs) | | Jimia Muhamed 9 (20); Henriette Ishimwe 4/9 (4 overs) |

Rwanda won by 56 runs
Botswana Cricket Association Oval 1, Gaborone

- Uganda won the toss and elected to bowl.

=== Third-Place play-off ===
12 September 2022
Scorecard

| Uganda; 110/4 (20 overs) | v | Namibia; 114/6 (17.1 overs) |
| Malisa Ariokot 30* (32); Jorinda Fourie 2/9 (4 overs) | | Edelle van Zyl 31 (29); Annet Anume 2/12 (2.1 overs) |

Namibia won by 4 wickets
Botswana Cricket Association Oval 1, Gaborone

- Namibia won the toss and elected to bowl.

=== Final ===
12 September 2022
Scorecard

| Tanzania; 84 (18 overs) | v | Rwanda; 86/4 (15.4 overs) |
| Rahima Kibwana 33 (39); Belise Murekatete 3/6 (3 overs) | | Merveille Uwase 25 (30); Josephine Shirima 1/11 (2 overs) |

Rwanda won by 6 wickets
Botswana Cricket Association Oval 1, Gaborone

- Tanzania won the toss and elected to bat.
