= Tanzania women's national under-19 cricket team =

Under-19 cricket team

Tanzania Women's Under-19 cricket team
- Association: Tanzania Cricket Association

Personnel
- Coach: (India) Arun Yadav

International Cricket Council
- ICC region: Africa

The Tanzania women's under-19 cricket team represents Tanzania in international under-19 women's cricket. The team is administered by the Tanzania Cricket Association.

The side played for the first time in the Africa Qualifier for the 2023 Under-19 Women's T20 World Cup.
