= Zimbabwe women's national under-19 cricket team =

Under-19 cricket team

Zimbabwe Women's Under-19 cricket team
- Association: Zimbabwe Cricket

Personnel
- Captain: Kelis Ndlovu
- Coach: Trevor Phiri

History
- Twenty20 debut: v. England at Senwes Park, Potchefstroom, South Africa; 15 January 2023
- U19 World Cup wins: 0

International Cricket Council
- ICC region: Africa

The Zimbabwe women's under-19 cricket team represents Zimbabwe in international under-19 women's cricket. The team is administrated by Zimbabwe Cricket (ZC).

The team played their first official matches at the 2023 ICC Under-19 Women's T20 World Cup, the first ever international women's under-19 cricket competition. The side finished bottom of their group at the inaugural tournament.

== History ==
The inaugural Women's Under-19 World Cup was scheduled to take place in January 2021, but was postponed multiple times due to the COVID-19 pandemic. The tournament eventually took place in January 2023, in South Africa. As a Full Member of the ICC, Zimbabwe qualified automatically for the tournament.

Zimbabwe announced their 15-player squad for the tournament on 7 December 2022. Trevor Phiri was announced as head coach of the side. The side finished bottom of the initial group stage at the tournament, and lost a subsequent play-off against Indonesia.

== Recent call-ups ==
The table below lists all the players who have been selected in recent squads for Zimbabwe under-19s. Currently, this only includes the squad for the 2023 ICC Under-19 Women's T20 World Cup.

Name	Most Recent Call-up
Olinda Chare	2023 World Cup
Kudzai Chigora	2023 World Cup
Betty Mangachena	2023 World Cup
Tawananyasha Marumani	2023 World Cup
Michelle Mavunga	2023 World Cup
Danielle Meikle	2023 World Cup
Chipo Moyo	2023 World Cup
Natasha Mutomba	2023 World Cup
Vimbai Mutungwindu	2023 World Cup
Rukudzo Mwakayeni	2023 World Cup
Faith Ndhlalambi	2023 World Cup
Kelly Ndiraya	2023 World Cup
Kelis Ndlovu	2023 World Cup
Adel Zimunhu	2023 World Cup

== Playing record ==
=== International match summary ===
As of 20 January 2023

Playing record
Format	M	W	L	T	D/NR	Inaugural match
Women's Under-19 Twenty20 Internationals	4	0	4	0	0	15 January 2023

Under-19 Twenty20 World Cup record
Year	Result	Teams	Pld	W	L	T	NR
(South Africa) 2023	Fourth-place play-offs	16	4	0	4	0	0
Total			4	0	4	0	0

=== Women's under-19 Twenty20 record against other nations ===
As of As of 20 January 2023

ICC Full members
Opponent	M	W	L	T	NR	First match	First win
England	1	0	1	0	0	15 January 2023	
Pakistan	1	0	1	0	0	19 January 2023	

Associate members
Opponent	M	W	L	T	NR	First match	First win
Indonesia	1	0	1	0	0	20 January 2023	
Rwanda	1	0	1	0	0	17 January 2023	
