= Indonesia women's national under-19 cricket team =

Under-19 cricket team

Indonesia Women's Under-19 cricket team
- Association: Cricket Indonesia

Personnel
- Captain: Wesikaratna Dewi

History
- Twenty20 debut: v. New Zealand at Absa Puk Oval, Potchefstroom, South Africa; 15 January 2023
- U19 World Cup wins: 0

International Cricket Council
- ICC region: East Asia-Pacific

The Indonesia women's under-19 cricket team represents Indonesia in international under-19 women's cricket. The team is administrated by Cricket Indonesia (CI).

Indonesia qualified for the inaugural ICC Under-19 Women's T20 World Cup by winning the East Asia-Pacific Qualifier. A 2–1 victory in the three-match series against Papua New Guinea made them the first Indonesian team to qualify for an ICC global tournament. They were eliminated in the first group stage of the tournament.

== History ==
The inaugural Women's Under-19 World Cup was scheduled to take place in January 2021. It was postponed multiple times due to the COVID-19 pandemic. The tournament eventually took place in January 2023, in South Africa. Indonesia competed in the East-Asia Pacific Qualifier in August 2022. The qualifier consisted of a three-match series against Papua New Guinea. They won the series 2–1 to qualify for the 2023 Under-19 World Cup.

Indonesia announced their squad for the tournament on 3 January 2023. They lost all three of their matches in the first group stage of the tournament. They beat Zimbabwe in a subsequent play-off.

== Recent selections ==
The table below lists all the players who have been selected for Indonesia under-19s. This only includes the squad for the 2023 ICC Under-19 Women's T20 World Cup at the moment.

Name	Most Recent Tournament
Desi Wulandari	2023 World Cup
Dewa Ayu Sasrikayoni	2023 World Cup
Gusti Ayu Ratna Ulansari	2023 World Cup
I Gusti Pratiwi	2023 World Cup
Kadek Ayu Kurniartini	2023 World Cup
Lie Qiao	2023 World Cup
Ni Kadek Ariani	2023 World Cup
Ni Kadek Dwi Indriyani	2023 World Cup
Ni Kadek Murtiari	2023 World Cup
Ni Made Suarniasih	2023 World Cup
Ni Putu Cantika	2023 World Cup
Sang Ayu Puspita Dewi	2023 World Cup
Thersiana Penu Weo	2023 World Cup
Wesikaratna Dewi	2023 World Cup
Yessny Djahilepang	2023 World Cup

== Records & statistics ==
International match summary

20 January 2023

Playing records
Format	M	W	L	T	D/NR	Inaugural match
Youth Women's Twenty20 Internationals	4	1	3	0	0	15 January 2023

Youth Women's Twenty20 record versus other nations

20 January 2023

ICC Full members
Opponent	M	W	L	T	NR	First match	First win
Ireland	1	0	1	0	0	19 January 2023	
New Zealand	1	0	1	0	0	15 January 2023	
(Cricket West Indies) West Indies	1	0	1	0	0	17 January 2023	
Zimbabwe	1	1	0	0	0	20 January 2023	20 January 2023

== Under-19 World Cup record ==
Indonesia U19 World Cup Record
Year	Result	Pos	№	Pld	W	L	T	NR
(South Africa) 2023	Fourth-Place Play-offs	–	16	4	1	3	0	0
Total				4	1	3	0	0
