= Samoa women's national under-19 cricket team =

Under-19 cricket team

Samoa Women's Under-19 cricket team
- Association: Samoa International Cricket Association

Personnel
- Captain: Avetia Mapu

International Cricket Council
- ICC region: East Asia-Pacific

The Samoa women's national under-19 cricket team represents Samoa in international under-19 women's cricket. The team is administered by Samoa International Cricket Association.

The side played for the first time in the East Asia-Pacific Qualifier for the 2025 Under-19 Women's T20 World Cup.

Samoa qualified for the 2025 Under-19 Women's T20 World Cup by winning the 2025 East Asia-Pacific Qualifier.

They also qualified for the 2027 Under-19 Women's T20 World Cup by winning the 2027 East Asia-Pacific Qualifier.
