= United Arab Emirates women's national under-19 cricket team =

Under-19 cricket team

United Arab Emirates Women's Under-19 cricket team
- Association: Emirates Cricket Board

Personnel
- Captain: Samaira Dharnidharka
- Coach: Ahmed Raza

History
- Twenty20 debut: v. Bhutan at Kinrara Academy Oval, Bandar Kinrara; 3 June 2022
- U19 World Cup wins: 0
- Under-19 Women's T20 World Cup Asia Qualifiers wins: (gold) (2022)

International Cricket Council
- ICC region: Asia

The United Arab Emirates women's under-19 cricket team represents the United Arab Emirates in international under-19 women's cricket. The team is administrated by the Emirates Cricket Board (ECB).

UAE qualified for the inaugural ICC Under-19 Women's T20 World Cup via winning the Asia Qualifier, going unbeaten in a five-team tournament. The side reached the Super Six stage of the inaugural tournament. Ahmed Raza serves as the head coach of the team whereas Samaira Dharnidharka was the UAE u-19 women's captain in all formats.

== History ==
The inaugural Women's Under-19 World Cup was scheduled to take place in January 2021, but was postponed multiple times due to the COVID-19 pandemic. The tournament was eventually held in January 2023, in South Africa. UAE competed in the Asia Qualifier for the tournament in June 2022 in Malaysia. The side won all of their group matches, including a decisive six wicket victory over Thailand, to qualify for the tournament.

UAE announced their squad for the tournament on 26 December 2022, with Najeeb Amar announced as Head Coach of the side. The side reached the Super Six stage, in which they finished bottom of their group.

== Recent call-ups ==
The table below lists all the players who have been selected in recent squads for United Arab Emirates under-19s. Currently, this includes the squads for the 2022 Asia T20 World Cup Qualifier and the 2023 Under-19 Women's T20 World Cup.

Name	Most Recent Call-up
Jia Bhatia	2022 Qualifier
Samaira Dharnidharka	2023 World Cup
Mahika Gaur	2023 World Cup
Siya Gokhale	2023 World Cup
Geethika Jyothis	2023 World Cup
Lavanya Keny	2023 World Cup
Vaishnave Mahesh	2023 World Cup
Induja Nandakumar	2023 World Cup
Rinitha Rajith	2023 World Cup
Rishitha Rajith	2023 World Cup
Sanjana Ramesh	2023 World Cup
Theertha Satish	2023 World Cup
Sanchin Singh	2023 World Cup
Avni Sunil Patil	2023 World Cup
Archana Supriya	2023 World Cup
Ishitha Zahra	2023 World Cup

== Records & statistics ==
International match summary

As of 23 November 2024

Playing records
Format	M	W	L	T	D/NR	Inaugural match
Youth Women's Twenty20 Internationals	16	10	6	0	0	3 June 2022

Youth Women's Twenty20 record versus other nations

As of 25 January 2023

ICC Full members
Opponent	M	W	L	T	NR	First match	First win
Australia	1	0	1	0	0	23 January 2023	
Bangladesh	1	0	1	0	0	25 January 2023	
India	1	0	1	0	0	16 January 2023	
South Africa	1	0	1	0	0	18 January 2023	

Associate members
Opponent	M	W	L	T	NR	First match	First win
Scotland	1	0	1	0	0	14 January 2023	

== Under-19 World Cup record ==
United Arab Emirates's U19 Twenty20 World Cup Record
Year	Result	Pos	№	Pld	W	L	T	NR
(South Africa) 2023	Super 6	–	16	5	0	5	0	0
(Malaysia) 2025	Did not Qualified							
(Bangladesh) (Nepal) 2027	Qualified							
Total				5	0	5	0	0

== Support staff ==
- Merin Saji (manager and physiotherapist),
- Ahmed Raza (head coach).
