= Kenya women's national under-19 cricket team =

Under-19 cricket team

Kenya Women's Under-19 cricket team
- Association: Kenya Cricket Association

International Cricket Council
- ICC region: Africa

The Kenya women's under-19 cricket team represents Kenya in international under-19 women's cricket. The team is administered by the Kenya Cricket Association.

The side played for the first time in the Africa Qualifier for the 2025 Under-19 Women's T20 World Cup.
