= Mozambique women's national under-19 cricket team =

Under-19 cricket team

Mozambique Women's Under-19 cricket team
- Association: Mozambican Cricket Association

International Cricket Council
- ICC region: Africa

The Mozambique women's under-19 cricket team represents Mozambique in international under-19 women's cricket. The team is administered by the Mozambican Cricket Association.

The side played for the first time in the Africa Qualifier for the 2023 Under-19 Women's T20 World Cup.
