= Nigeria women's national under-19 cricket team =

Under-19 cricket team

Nigeria Women's Under-19 cricket team
- Association: Nigeria Cricket Federation

Personnel
- Captain: Piety Lucky
- Coach: Sarah Bhakita

Team information
- Colors: Green & Yellow

History
- Twenty20 debut: v. New Zealand at Borneo Cricket Ground, Sarawak, Malaysia; 20 January 2025

International Cricket Council
- ICC region: Africa
T20I kit

The Nigeria women's under-19 cricket team represents Nigeria in international under-19 women's cricket. The team is administered by the Nigeria Cricket Federation.

The side played for the first time in the Africa Qualifier for the 2023 Under-19 Women's T20 World Cup. They finished 6th in the tournament after reaching the Super 6 stage, managing to defeat two full-member teams.

== Performance record ==
Key
Champions
Runners-up
Semi-finals

=== U-19 T20 World Cup ===
Year	Result	Place	№	Pld	W	L	T	NR
(South Africa) 2023	Did not qualify							
(Malaysia) 2025	Super 6	6th	16	5	2	1	0	2
(Bangladesh) (Nepal) 2027	To be determined							
Total	0 titles	—N/a		5	2	1	0	2

== Records & statistics ==
International match summary

As of 29 January 2025

Playing records
Format	M	W	L	T	D/NR	Inaugural match
Youth Women's Twenty20 Internationals	3	2	1	0	0	20 January 2025

Youth Women's Twenty20 record versus other nations

As of 29 January 2023

ICC Full members
Opponent	M	W	L	T	NR	First match	First win
Ireland	1	1	0	0	0	29 January 2025	29 January 2025
New Zealand	1	1	0	0	0	20 January 2025	20 January 2025
South Africa	1	0	1	0	0	22 January 2025	
