= Sierra Leone women's national under-19 cricket team =

Under-19 cricket team

Sierra Leone Women's Under-19 cricket team
- Association: Cricket Sierra Leone

International Cricket Council
- ICC region: Africa

The Sierra Leone women's under-19 cricket team represents Sierra Leone in international under-19 women's cricket. The team is administered by the Cricket Sierra Leone.

The side played for the first time in the Africa Qualifier for the 2023 Under-19 Women's T20 World Cup.
