= Namibia women's national under-19 cricket team =

Under-19 cricket team

Namibia Women's Under-19 cricket team
- Association: Cricket Namibia

Personnel
- Captain: Engela Van Der Merwe

International Cricket Council
- ICC region: Africa

The Namibia women's under-19 cricket team represents Namibia in international under-19 women's cricket. The team is administered by the Cricket Namibia.

The side played their first official matches in the Africa Qualifier for the 2023 Under-19 Women's T20 World Cup.
