= Under-19 Women's T20 World Cup =

U19 Women's T20I Cricket World Cup

ICC Under-19 Women's T20 World Cup
- Administrator: International Cricket Council
- Format: Limited-overs (20 overs)
- First edition: 2023 South Africa
- Latest edition: 2025 Malaysia
- Next edition: 2027 Bangladesh, Nepal
- Tournament format: Round Robin and Knockout
- Number of teams: 16
- Current champion: India (2nd title)
- Most successful: India (2 titles)
- Most runs: (India) Gongadi Trisha (425)
- Most wickets: (India) Vaishnavi Sharma (17)
- Website: ICC U19 Women's T20 World Cup

The ICC Under-19 Women's T20 World Cup is an international cricket tournament organised by the International Cricket Council contested by women's national under-19 teams. The first tournament took place in January 2023 in South Africa, with matches being played in the Twenty20 cricket format. India won the inaugural tournament, defeating England in the final. India defended their title after defeating South Africa in the second edition.

== History ==
Women's U-19 T20 World Cup winners
Year	Champions
2023	India
2025	India (2)

The inaugural tournament was scheduled to take place in January 2021, before being moved back to December 2021 due to the COVID-19 pandemic. In January 2021, the Bangladesh Cricket Board confirmed that they would host the tournament, but it was later postponed for a second time and moved to January 2023, with the ICC looking for another host nation.

The inaugural tournament eventually took place in January 2023 in South Africa, with sixteen teams competing. India won the competition, defeating England in the final by seven wickets.

It was announced that Malaysia and Thailand would jointly host the 2025 Under-19 Women's T20 World Cup, with Bangladesh and Nepal jointly hosting the 2027 event. On 18 August 2024 it was announced that Thailand had withdrawn as host which made Malaysia the sole host of 2025 Under-19 Women's T20 World Cup. India won their second title after defeating South Africa by 9 wickets.

== Editions and results ==
Year	Host(s)	Final venue	Final			No. of teams
Year	Host(s)	Final venue	Winners	Result	Runners-up	No. of teams
2023	South Africa	Senwes Park, Potchefstroom	India; 69/3 (14 overs)	India won by 7 wickets Scorecard	England; 68 (17.1 overs)	16
2025	Malaysia	Bayuemas Oval, Pandamaran	India; 84/1 (11.2 overs)	India won by 9 wickets Scorecard	South Africa; 82 (20 overs)	16
2027	Bangladesh; Nepal	Chittagong				16

== Performance by nations ==
Source: ESPNcricinfo

Team	Appearances			Best Performance	Statistics					
Team	Total	First	Latest	Best Performance	Played	Won	Lost	Tie	NR	Win%
India	2	2023	2025	Champions (2023, 2025)	14	13	1	0	0	92.85
England	2	2023	2025	Runners-up (2023)	12	9	2	0	1	81.81
South Africa	2	2023	2025	Runners-up (2025)	11	9	2	0	0	81.81
Australia	2	2023	2025	3rd place (2025)	12	8	4	0	0	66.67
New Zealand	2	2023	2025	3rd place (2023)	11	7	4	0	0	63.63
Bangladesh	2	2023	2025	5th place (2023)	10	7	3	0	0	70.00
Sri Lanka	2	2023	2025	5th place (2025)	9	4	5	0	0	44.44
Nigeria	1	2025	2025	6th place (2025)	3	2	1	0	0	66.66
Pakistan	2	2023	2025	7th place (2023)	8	4	4	0	0	50.00
Rwanda	1	2023	2023	8th place (2023)	5	2	3	0	0	40.00
United States	2	2023	2025	8th place (2025)	7	1	6	0	0	14.28
West Indies	2	2023	2025	9th place (2023)	10	3	7	0	0	30.00
Scotland	2	2023	2025	10th place (2025)	8	2	6	0	0	25.00
Ireland	2	2023	2025	11th place (2023, 2025)	10	2	7	0	1	22.22
United Arab Emirates	1	2023	2023	12th place (2023)	5	1	4	0	0	20.00
Nepal	1	2025	2025	14th place (2025)	4	1	3	0	0	25.00
Indonesia	1	2023	2023	15th place (2023)	4	1	3	0	0	25.00
Samoa	1	2025	2025	15th place (2025)	3	0	3	0	0	0.00
Malaysia	1	2025	2025	16th place (2025)	4	0	4	0	0	0.00
Zimbabwe	1	2023	2023	16th place (2023)	4	0	4	0	0	0.00

Note:

- Teams are sorted by their best performance, then winning percentage, then (if equal) by alphabetical order.
- The result percentage excludes no results and counts ties as half a win.

Legend
1st	Winner
2nd	Runners-up
3rd	3rd place
Q	Qualified
×	Did not qualify
	Hosts

== Performance by tournament ==
Team	Edition			Total
Team	(South Africa) 2023	(Malaysia) 2025	(Bangladesh) (Nepal) 2027	Total
Australia	4th	3rd	Q	2
Bangladesh	5th	7th	Q	3
England	2nd	4th	Q	2
India	1st	1st	Q	2
Indonesia	15th	×	×	1
Ireland	11th	11th	Q	2
Malaysia	×	16th	×	1
Nepal	×	14th	Q	2
New Zealand	3rd	9th	Q	2
Nigeria	×	6th	Q	1
Pakistan	7th	13th	Q	2
Rwanda	8th	×	×	1
Samoa	×	15th	Q	1
Scotland	13th	10th	Q	2
South Africa	6th	2nd	Q	2
Sri Lanka	10th	5th	Q	2
United Arab Emirates	12th	×	Q	2
United States	14th	8th	Q	2
West Indies	9th	12th	Q	2
Zimbabwe	16th	×	×	1

== Team debuts ==
Year	Debutants	Total
2023	Australia, Bangladesh, England, India, Indonesia, Ireland, New Zealand, Pakistan, Rwanda, Scotland, South Africa, Sri Lanka, United Arab Emirates, United States, West Indies, Zimbabwe	16
2025	Malaysia, Nepal, Nigeria, Samoa	4
2027	None	0
Total		20

== Tournament records ==
As of 2 February 2025

Records			Ref
Batting
Most runs	(India) Gongadi Trisha	425 (2023-2025)	
Highest score	(India) Gongadi Trisha (v Scotland)	110* (2025)	
Most runs in a tournament	(India) Gongadi Trisha	309 (2025)	
Bowling
Most wickets	(South Africa) Kayla Reyneke	19 (2023-2025)	
Best bowling figures	(India) Vaishnavi Sharma (v Malaysia)	5/5 (2025)	
Most wickets in a tournament	(India) Vaishnavi Sharma	17 (2025)	
Team
Highest team total	India (v United Arab Emirates)	219/3 (2023)	
Lowest team total	Samoa (v South Africa)	16 (2025)	
Largest victory (by runs)	England (v Zimbabwe)	174 (2023)	
Highest match aggregate	India v South Africa	336/8 (2023)	
Lowest match aggregate	South Africa v Samoa	33/10 (2025)	
