= 2025 ICC Under-19 Women's T20 World Cup squads =

List of cricket squads

The 2025 Under-19 Women's T20 World Cup was held in Malaysia in January 2025. Sixteen teams took part in the tournament, with their squads listed below.

== Group A ==
=== India ===
India's squad was announced on 24 December 2024.

- Niki Prasad (c)
- Sanika Chalke (vc)
- Bhavika Ahire (wk)
- Ishwari Awsare
- VJ Joshitha
- G Kamalini (wk)
- Drithi Kesari
- Anandita Kishor
- Vaishnavi Sharma
- Shabnam Shakil
- Aayushi Shukla
- Parunika Sisodia
- Gongadi Trisha
- Mithila Vinod
- Sonam Yadav

Nandhana S, Ira Jadhav and Anadi T were named as standby players.

=== Malaysia ===
Malaysia's squad was announced on 10 January 2025.

- Nur Dania Syuhada (c)
- Nur Ain
- Fatin Faqihah Adani
- Nur Aliya
- Nur Alya Batrisyia
- Irdina Beh
- Nur Isma Dania
- Nuni Farini
- Nuriman Hidayah
- Nazatul Hidayah Husna
- Suabika Manivannan
- Siti Nazwah
- Marsya Qistina
- Nur Izzatul Syafiqa
- Neserle Yean

=== Sri Lanka ===
Sri Lanka's squad was announced on 10 January 2025.

- Manudi Nanayakkara (c)
- Rashmika Sewwandi (vc)
- Vimoksha Balasooriya
- Shashini Gimhani
- Shehara Induwari
- Sanjana Kavindi
- Hiruni Kumari
- Pramudi Methsara
- Rashmi Nethranjali
- Sumudu Nisansala
- Chamudi Praboda
- Dahami Sanethma
- Aseni Thalagune
- Danuli Thennakoon
- Limansa Thilakaratne

Nethangi Isuranjali was named as a travelling reserve.

=== West Indies ===
West Indies' squad was announced on 23 December 2024.

- Samara Ramnath (c)
- Asabi Callender (vc)
- Abigail Bryce
- Kenika Cassar
- Jahzara Claxton
- Denella Creese
- Naijanni Cumberbatch
- Erin Deane
- Amiah Gilbert
- Trisha Hardat
- Brianna Harricharan
- Amrita Ramtahal
- Selena Ross
- Kristen Sutherland
- Aaliyah Weekes

Dicoreya Collymore, Krisanne Howell, Aneisha Miller, Danellie Manns, and Laurene Williams were named as reserves.

== Group B ==
=== England ===
England's squad was announced on 3 October 2024.

- Abi Norgrove (c)
- Phoebe Brett
- Olivia Brinsden
- Matilda Corteen-Coleman
- Trudy Johnson
- Katie Jones (wk)
- Charlotte Lambert
- Eve O'Neill
- Davina Perrin
- Jemima Spence (wk)
- Charlotte Stubbs
- Amuruthaa Surenkumar
- Prisha Thanawala
- Erin Thomas
- Grace Thompson

Maria Andrews, Sophie Beech, Daisy Gibb, Poppy Tulloch and Annie Williams were named as non-travelling reserves.

=== Ireland ===
Ireland's squad was announced on 11 December 2024. On 23 December 2024, Alice Tector was ruled out of the tournament due to injury, and was replaced by Rebecca Lowe who was initially named as travelling reserves. On 3 January 2025, Amy Hunter was ruled out of the tournament due a foot injury, with Ally Boucher was named as her replacement, who was initially named as non-travelling reserves and Niamh MacNulty was named as captain. On 14 January 2025, Aimee Maguire was ruled out of the tournament due to suspect bowling action, and was replaced by Genevieve Morrissey.

- Niamh MacNulty (c)
- ~~Amy Hunter (c, wk)~~
- Freya Sargent (vc)
- Ally Boucher (wk)
- Abbi Harrison
- Jennifer Jackson
- Rebecca Lowe
- ~~Aimee Maguire~~
- Lara McBride
- Kia McCartney
- Ellie McGee
- Julie McNally
- Genevieve Morrissey
- Lucy Neely
- Millie Spence
- Annabel Squires
- ~~Alice Tector~~
- Alice Walsh

Síbha Bhoja was named as non-travelling reserves.

=== Pakistan ===
Pakistan's squad was announced on 28 December 2024.

- Komal Khan (c, wk)
- Zoofishan Ayyaz (vc)
- Haniah Ahmer
- Maham Anees
- Areesha Ansari
- Shahar Bano
- Ravail Farhan
- Wasifa Hussain
- Tayyaba Imdad
- Memoona Khalid
- Fatima Khan
- Minahil
- Aleesa Mukhtiar
- Quratulain
- Mahnoor Zeb

Fizza Fiaz, Laiba Nasir, Manahil Javed, Rozina Akram and Sania Rasheed were named as non-travelling reserves.

=== United States ===
United States's squad was announced on 20 December 2024.

- Anika Kolan (c)
- Aditiba Chudasama (vc)
- Disha Dhingra
- Nikhar Doshi
- Pooja Ganesh
- Saanvi Immadi
- Maahi Madhavan
- Chetna Pagydyala
- Chetnaa Prasad
- Pooja Shah
- Lekha Shetty
- Ritu Singh
- Suhani Thadani
- Isani Vaghela
- Sasha Vallabhaneni

Mitali Patwardhan, Taranum Chopra and Varshita Jambula were named as non-travelling reserves.

== Group C ==
=== New Zealand ===
New Zealand's squad was announced on 8 January 2025.

- Tash Wakelin (c)
- Elizabeth Buchanan
- Kate Chandler
- Sophie Court
- Hannah Francis
- Kate Irwin
- Rishika Jaswal
- Louisa Kotkamp
- Ayaan Lambat
- Emma McLeod
- Hannah O’Connor
- Darcy-Rose Prasad
- Anika Tauwhare
- Anika Todd
- Eve Wolland

=== Nigeria ===
Nigeria's squad was announced on 18 December 2024.

- Lucky Piety (c)
- Akhigbe Anointed
- Oguai Beauty
- Chukwuonye Christabel
- Bassey Deborah (wk)
- Umoh Inyene
- Bieni Jessica
- Amusa Kehinde
- Ude Lilian
- Memeh Naomi
- Eguakun Omosigho
- Usen Peace
- Agboya Peculiar
- Adekunle Shola
- Igbinedion Victory

=== Samoa ===
Samoa's squad was announced on 10 January 2025.

- Avetia Fetu Mapu (c)
- Verra Farane
- Barbara Ella Keresoma
- Olive Lefaga Lemoe
- Selina Lilo
- Jane Tali'ilagi Manase
- Stefania Pauga
- Apolonia K Polataivao
- Silepea Polataivao
- Stella Sagalala
- Norah-Jade Salima
- Katrina Uiese Taa Samu
- Angel Sootaga So
- Masina Tafea
- Sala Viliamu

=== South Africa ===
South Africa's squad was announced on 20 December 2024.

- Kayla Reyneke (c)
- Jemma Botha
- Fay Cowling
- Jae-Leigh Filander
- Mona-Lisa Legodi
- Simoné Lourens
- Karabo Meso (wk)
- Seshnie Naidu
- Nthabiseng Nini
- Luyanda Nzuza
- Diara Ramlakan
- Diedré van Rensburg
- Mieke van Voorst
- Ashleigh van Wyk
- Chanel Venter

Lethabo Bidli, Keamogetswe Chuene, Jenna-Lee Lubbe, Jané Verhage and Sinelethu Yaso were named as non-travelling reserves.

== Group D ==
=== Australia ===
Australia's squad was announced on 11 December 2024.

- Lucy Hamilton (c)
- Chloe Ainsworth
- Lily Bassingthwaighte
- Caoimhe Bray
- Ella Briscoe
- Maggie Clark
- Hasrat Gill
- Amy Hunter
- Sara Kennedy
- Eleanor Larosa
- Grace Lyons (wk)
- Ines McKeon
- Juliette Morton
- Kate Pelle (wk)
- Tegan Williamson

=== Bangladesh ===
Bangladesh's squad was announced on 26 December 2024.

- Sumaiya Akter (c)
- Afia Ashima Era (vc)
- Fariya Akter
- Sadia Akter
- Fahomida Choya
- Farjana Easmin
- Mst Eva
- Juairiya Ferdous
- Habiba Islam
- Sadia Islam
- Lucky Khatun
- Jannatul Maoua
- Nishita Akter Nishi
- Anisa Akter Soba
- Sumaiya Akther Suborna

Ashrafi Yeasmin Arthy, Leky Chakma, Arvin Tani and Maharun Nesa were named as non-travelling reserves.

=== Nepal ===
Nepal's squad was announced on 04 January 2025.

- Puja Mahato (c)
- Sony Pakhrin (vc)
- Trishna BK
- Rachana Chaudhary
- Sabitri Dhami
- Krishma Gurung
- Kusum Godar
- Seemana KC
- Anu Kadayat
- Kiran Kunwar
- Sneha Mahara
- Jyotsnika Marasini
- Sana Praveen
- Riya Sharma
- Alisha Yadav (wk)

=== Scotland ===
Scotland's squad was announced on 16 December 2024.

- Amelie Baldie
- Molly Barbour-Smith
- Gabriella Fontenla
- Lucy Forrester Smith
- Pippa Kelly
- Maisie Maceira
- Kirsty McColl
- Niamh Muir
- Charlotte Nevard
- Mollie Parker
- Nayma Sheikh
- Rosie Speedy
- Pippa Sproul
- Jenna Stanton
- Emma Walsingham

Georgia Birkinshaw, Teagan Broughton, Emily Duguid, Rebecca McCrossan, Ruth McKay and Sam Robson were named as non-travelling reserves.
