= 2024 ACC Under-19 Women's T20 Asia Cup =

Cricket tournament

- Tournament logo
- Dates: 15 – 22 December 2024
- Administrator: Asian Cricket Council
- Cricket format: Limited-overs (20 overs)
- Tournament format(s): Group round-robin and knockout
- Host: Malaysia
- Champions: India (1st title)
- Runners-up: Bangladesh
- Participants: 6
- Matches: 12
- Player of the series: (India) Gongadi Trisha
- Most runs: (India) Gongadi Trisha (159)
- Most wickets: (India) Aayushi Shukla (10)

2024 ACC Under-19 Women's T20 Asia Cup was the inaugural edition of the Under-19 Women's T20 Asia Cup, a limited overs cricket tournament featured six under-19 women's teams. The four Asian full members along with the host Malaysia and Nepal, who qualified as the winner of the 2025 U-19 Women's Asia Qualifier, took part in the tournament. The tournament took place in mid-December in 2024.

== Teams and qualifications ==
Means of qualification	Date	Host	Berths	Qualified
Host	—N/a	—N/a	1	Malaysia
ICC Full Members	—N/a	—N/a	4	Bangladesh
ICC Full Members	—N/a	—N/a	4	India
ICC Full Members	—N/a	—N/a	4	Pakistan
ICC Full Members	—N/a	—N/a	4	Sri Lanka
2024 U-19 Women's Asia Qualifier	6–13 November 2024	United Arab Emirates	1	Nepal
Total			6	

== Squads ==
Bangladesh	India	Malaysia	Nepal	Pakistan	Sri Lanka
Sumaiya Akter (c); Afia Ashima (vc); Fariya Akter; Sadia Akter; Fahomida Choya; Habiba Islam; Mosammat Eva; Farjana Easmin; Juairiya Ferdous; Jannatul Maoua; Maharun Nesa; Nishita Akter Nishi; Sumaiya Akther Suborna; Anisa Akter Soba; Arvin Tani	Niki Prasad (c); Sanika Chalke (vc); Bhavika Ahire (wk); Ishawari Awasare; Kesari Drithi; Kamalini G (wk); Anandita Kishor; Nandhana S; Shabnam Shakil; Aayushi Shukla; Parunika Sisodiya; Gongadi Trisha; Mithila Vinod; Joshitha VJ; Sonam Yadav	Nur Dania Syuhada (c); Nur Aliya Hairun; Nur Alya; Nur Ain Roslan; Irdina Beh Nabil; Nuni Farini; Fatin Faqihah Adani; Nuriman Hidayah; Nazatul Hidayah Husna; Nur Isma; Nur Izzatul Syafiqa; Suabika Manivannan; Siti Nazwah; Marsya Qistina; Neserle Yean Alik	Puja Mahato (c); Sony Pakhrin (vc); Trishana BK; Rachana Chaudhary; Sabitri Dhami (wk); Kusum Godar; Krishma Gurung; Anu Kadayat; Seemana KC; Kiran Kunwar; Sneha Mahara; Jyotsnika Marasini; Sana Praveen; Riya Shrama; Alisha Yadav (wk)	Zoofishan Ayyaz (c); Komal Khan (vc, wk); Haniah Ahmer; Rozina Akram; Areesha Ansari; Maham Anees; Shahar Bano; Fizza Fiaz; Ravail Farhan; Wasifa Hussain (wk); Tayyaba Imdad; Fatima Khan; Aleesa Mukhtiar; Quratulain; Mahnoor Zeb	Manudi Nanayakkara (c); Rashmika Sewwandi (vc); Vimoksha Balasooriya; Shashini Gimhani; Hiruni Hansika; Shehara Induwari; Sanjana Kavindi; Pramudi Methsara; Rashmi Nethranjali; Sumudu Nisansala; Chamodi Praboda; Dahami Sanuthma; Asheni Thalagune; Limansa Thilakaratne; Danuli Thennakoon

India also named Hurley Gala, Happy Kumari, G Kavya Sree, Gayatri Survase as standbys and Prapti Raval as non-travelling reserve. Sri Lanka also named Nethangi Isuranjali as their travelling reserve.

== Group stage ==
=== Group A ===
==== Points table ====
Pos	Team	Pld	W	L	T	NR	Pts	NRR	Qualification
1	Bangladesh	2	2	0	0	0	4	4.000	Super Four
2	Sri Lanka	2	1	1	0	0	2	1.784	Super Four
3	Malaysia (H)	2	0	2	0	0	0	−5.350	Fifth Place play-off

Source: ESPNcricinfo
(H) Host

==== Fixtures ====
15 December 2024
09:30
Scorecard

Sri Lanka; 153/4 (20 overs)	v	Malaysia; 59/6 (20 overs)
Manudi Nanayakkara 74* (40); Nur Dania Syuhada 2/21 (4 overs)		Nur Ain Roslan 12 (15); Hiruni Hansika 2/2 (3 overs)

Sri Lanka won by 94 runs
Bayuemas Oval, Kuala Lumpur
Umpires: Saleema Imtiaz (Pak) and Gayathri Venugopalan (Ind)
Player of the match: Manudi Nanayakkara (SL)

- Sri Lanka won the toss and elected to bat.

16 December 2024
09:30
Scorecard

Bangladesh; 122/9 (17 overs)	v	Sri Lanka; 94/8 (17 overs)
Sadia Akter 31 (25); Rashmika Sewwandi 4/23 (3 overs)		Sanjana Kavindi 21 (13); Sumaiya Akter 3/12 (2 overs)

Bangladesh won by 28 runs
Bayuemas Oval, Kuala Lumpur
Umpires: Nur Hijrah (Mas) and Narayanan Janani (Ind)
Player of the match: Nishita Akter Nishi (Ban)

- Sri Lanka won the toss and elected to field.
- The match was reduced to 17 overs per side due to a rain and wet outfield.

17 December 2024
09:30
Scorecard

Bangladesh; 149/5 (20 overs)	v	Malaysia; 29 (14.5 overs)
Jannatul Maoua 45* (45); Marsya Qistina 3/19 (4 overs)		Nur Aliya Hairun 5 (11); Nishita Akter Nishi 5/3 (3.5 overs)

Bangladesh won by 120 runs
Bayuemas Oval, Kuala Lumpur
Umpires: Saleema Imtiaz (Pak) and Nimali Perera (SL)
Player of the match: Jannatul Maoua (Ban)

- Bangladesh won the toss and elected to bat.

=== Group B ===
==== Points table ====
Pos	Team	Pld	W	L	T	NR	Pts	NRR	Qualification
1	India	2	1	0	0	1	3	5.331	Super Four
2	Nepal	2	1	0	0	1	3	0.326	Super Four
3	Pakistan	2	0	2	0	0	0	−2.172	Fifth Place play-off

Source: ESPNcricinfo

==== Fixture ====
15 December 2024
14:00
Scorecard

Pakistan; 67/7 (20 overs)	v	India; 68/1 (7.5 overs)
Komal Khan 24 (32); Sonam Yadav 4/6 (4 overs)		G Kamalini 44* (29); Fatima Khan 1/22 (3 overs)

India won by 9 wickets
Bayuemas Oval, Kuala Lumpur
Umpires: Shathira Jakir (Ban) and Nimali Perera (SL)
Player of the match: G Kamalini (Ind)

- Pakistan won the toss and elected to bat.

16 December 2024
14:00
Scorecard

Pakistan; 104/5 (20 overs)	v	Nepal; 105/4 (19 overs)
Komal Khan 38 (43); Puja Mahato 2/27 (4 overs)		Puja Mahato 47* (47); Fatima Khan 1/11 (4 overs)

Nepal won by 6 wickets
Bayuemas Oval, Kuala Lumpur
Umpires: Shathira Jakir (Ban) and Gayathri Venugopalan (Ind)
Player of the match: Puja Mahato (Nep)

- Pakistan won the toss and elected to bat.

17 December 2024
14:00
Scorecard

Nepal; 94/8 (20 overs)	v	India; 28/0 (3.1 overs)
Puja Mahato 25 (40); Parunika Sisodia 4/12 (4 overs)		Gongadi Trisha 17* (13)

No result
Bayuemas Oval, Kuala Lumpur
Umpires: Nur Hijrah (Mas) and Dedunu Silva (SL)

- India won the toss and elected to field.
- No further play was possible due to rain.

== Super Four ==
Pos	Team	Pld	W	L	T	NR	Pts	NRR	Qualification
1	India	4	3	0	0	1	7	3.266	Final
2	Bangladesh	4	3	1	0	0	6	1.749	Final
3	Nepal	4	1	1	0	2	4	−0.130	
4	Sri Lanka	4	1	2	0	1	3	0.593	

Source: ESPNcricinfo

Note: Super Four standings include points and performances from the group stage matches too.

=== Fixtures ===
19 December 2024
09:30
Scorecard

Bangladesh; 80/8 (20 overs)	v	India; 86/2 (12.1 overs)
Mosammat Eva 14 (19); Aayushi Shukla 3/9 (4 overs)		Gongadi Trisha 58* (45); Anisha Akter 2/19 (4 overs)

India won by 8 wickets
Bayuemas Oval, Kuala Lumpur
Umpires: Nimali Perera (SL) and Dedunu Silva (SL)
Player of the match: Gongadi Trisha (Ind)

- India won the toss and elected to field.

19 December 2024
14:00
Scorecard

Sri Lanka; 1/1 (1 over)	v	Nepal
Sanjana Kavindi 1* (2); Puja Mahato 1/1 (1 over)

No result
Bayuemas Oval, Kuala Lumpur
Umpires: Shathira Jakir (Ban) and Gayathri Venugopalan (Ind)

- Nepal won the toss and elected to field.
- No further play was possible due to rain.

20 December 2024
09:30
Scorecard

Sri Lanka; 98/9 (20 overs)	v	India; 102/6 (14.5 overs)
Manudi Nanayakkara 33 (30); Aayushi Shukla 4/10 (4 overs)		Gongadi Trisha 32 (24); Chamodi Praboda 3/16 (4 overs)

India won by 4 wickets
Bayuemas Oval, Kuala Lumpur
Umpires: Saleema Imtiaz (Pak) and Shathira Jakir (Ban)
Player of the match: Aayushi Shukla (Ind)

- India won the toss and elected to field.

20 December 2024
14:00
Scorecard

Nepal; 54/8 (11 overs)	v	Bangladesh; 58/1 (9.5 overs)
Sabitri Dhami 11 (12); Anisa Akter 1/10 (2 overs)		Fahomida Choya 26* (32); Kusum Godar 1/12 (1.5 overs)

Bangladesh won by 9 wickets
Bayuemas Oval, Kuala Lumpur
Umpires: Narayanan Janani (Ind) and Nimali Perera (SL)
Player of the match: Fahomida Choya (Ban)

- Bangladesh won the toss and elected to field.
- The match was reduced to 11 overs per side due to rain.

== Fifth Place play-off ==
18 December 2024
14:00 UTC+8
Scorecard

Pakistan; 115/6 (20 overs)	v	Malaysia; 5/2 (3.2 overs)
Areesha Ansari 42* (35); Nur Dania Syuhada 1/16 (4 overs)		Nur Aliya Hairun 1 (2); Mahnoor Zeb 2/2 (1.2 overs)

No result
Bayuemas Oval, Kuala Lumpur
Umpires: Narayanan Janani (Ind) and Dedunu Silva (SL)

- Pakistan won the toss and elected to bat.
- No further play was possible due to rain.

== Final ==
22 December 2024
14:00 UTC+8
Scorecard

India; 117/7 (20 overs)	v	Bangladesh; 76 (18.3 overs)
Gongadi Trisha 52 (47); Farjana Easmin 4/31 (4 overs)		Juairiya Ferdous 22 (30); Aayushi Shukla 3/17 (3.3 overs)

India won by 41 runs
Bayuemas Oval, Kuala Lumpur
Umpires: Nur Hijrah (Mas) and Nimali Perera (SL)
Player of the match: Gongadi Trisha (Ind)

- Bangladesh won the toss and elected to field.

== Final standings ==
Position	Team	Pld	W	L	NR
1st place, gold medalist(s)	India	5	4	0	1
2nd place, silver medalist(s)	Bangladesh	5	3	1	1
3rd place, bronze medalist(s)	Nepal	5	3	2	0
4	Sri Lanka	4	1	2	1
5	Malaysia	3	0	2	1
5	Pakistan	3	0	2	1

== See also ==
- 2024 ACC Under-19 Asia Cup
