= 2025 Under-19 Women's T20 World Cup =

Cricket tournament

2025 ICC Under-19 Women's T20 World Cup
- Dates: 18 January – 2 February 2025
- Administrator: International Cricket Council (ICC)
- Cricket format: Limited-overs (20 overs)
- Tournament format(s): Group stage, Super 6s and Knockout stage
- Host: Malaysia
- Champions: India (2nd title)
- Runners-up: South Africa
- Participants: 16
- Matches: 41
- Player of the series: (India) Gongadi Trisha
- Most runs: (India) Gongadi Trisha (309)
- Most wickets: (India) Vaishnavi Sharma (17)
- Official website: ICC U19 Women's T20 World Cup

The 2025 ICC Under-19 Women's T20 World Cup was the second edition of the Under-19 Women's T20 World Cup that was hosted by Malaysia in 2025. The schedule of the tournament was announced by International Cricket Council on 18 August 2024. India were the defending champions. Nigeria, making their first appearance in the Under-19 Women's T20 World Cup, achieved a surprise victory over New Zealand in the group stage.

India won their second consecutive title by defeating South Africa by 9 wickets in the final.

== Qualification ==
The top 10 full member teams secured direct qualification. In May 2024, Samoa became the first team to qualify from regional pathway, after winning the East Asia-Pacific Qualifier. For the second time in a row, United States of America received automatic qualification for the World Cup as they were still the only team in the region to fulfill the criteria required to enter the qualification pathway.

List of teams qualified for the 2025 Under-19 Women's T20 World Cup
Means of qualification	Berths	Qualified
Host nation	1	Malaysia
Automatic qualification	10	Australia
Automatic qualification	10	Bangladesh
Automatic qualification	10	England
Automatic qualification	10	India
Automatic qualification	10	Ireland
Automatic qualification	10	New Zealand
Automatic qualification	10	Pakistan
Automatic qualification	10	South Africa
Automatic qualification	10	Sri Lanka
Automatic qualification	10	West Indies
Regional qualification	5	Nepal
Regional qualification	5	Nigeria
Regional qualification	5	Samoa
Regional qualification	5	Scotland
Regional qualification	5	United States (Note: United States qualified automatically as they were the only team in the region that fulfilled the required criteria.)
Total	16	

== Competition format ==
The 16 teams will divided into four groups of four, and will play once against each other side in their group. The top three teams in each group will progress to the Super Six League stage, where qualifying teams from Group A will play against two of the qualifying teams from Group D, and qualifying teams from Group B will play against two of the qualifying teams from Group C. Points from matches against teams that also qualified from the first group stage will carried forward into the Super Six League stage. The top two sides from each of the Super Six Leagues will progress to the semi-finals, with the final taking place on 2 February 2025.

== Squads ==
Each team could select a squad of fifteen players for the tournament, with additional non-travelling reserves also able to be named.

England were the first side to name their squad, doing so on 3 October 2024. Australia and Ireland announced their squads on 11 December 2024. Scotland announced its squad on 16 December 2024. Nigeria announced its squad on 18 December 2024. South Africa and United States announced their squads on 20 December 2024. West Indies announced their squad on 23 December 2024. India announced its squad on 24 December 2024. Bangladesh announced its squad on 26 December 2024. Pakistan announced its squad on 28 December 2024. Nepal announced its squad on 4 January 2025. New Zealand announced its squad on 8 January 2025. Sri Lanka, Samoa and the host Malaysia announced their squad on 10 January 2025.

== Venues ==
Pandamaran	Johor	Bangi	Sarawak
Bayuemas Oval	Johor Cricket Academy Oval	YSD-UKM Cricket Oval	Borneo Cricket Ground
Capacity: 3,000	Capacity: 500	Capacity: 500	Capacity: 500

== Preparation ==
The six Asian teams in the tournament (Bangladesh, India, Pakistan, Sri Lanka, Malaysia and Nepal) played the inaugural Women's Under-19 Asia Cup in December 2024 in Malaysia, the same host as the World Cup. Nigeria trained at OMTEX Cricket Academy in Mumbai, along with playing matches. Ireland and Scotland played a tri-series at Sevens Stadium in Dubai, which also featured senior UAE women's cricket team. Bangladesh and Sri Lanka played a four-match series at Colombo, which ended in 2–2 draw. South Africa hosted USA in a three-match series, which South Africa won 2–1. This ran parallel to USA men's Under-19 team playing the CSA Under-19 Cubs Week for the first time, and winning it. South Africa also toured Pune the previous month, to play a tri-series against two different Under-19 teams of India, where they finished runners-up to India B. Samoa took part in team training sessions and played in practice matches in New Zealand, conducted by Auckland Cricket Association. Thailand and Malaysia played bilateral series in each other's country, along with Thailand playing in JCC tri-series with Malaysian domestic teams.

== Match officials ==
On 13 January 2025, the ICC appointed the officials for the tournament.

Match Referees

- (Australia) David Gilbert
- (England) Dean Cosker
- (New Zealand) Trudy Anderson
- (Cricket West Indies) Reon King

Umpires

- (Australia) Ashlee Gibbons
- (Bangladesh) Shathira Jakir
- (India) Narayanan Janani
- (India) Gayathri Venugopalan
- (Republic of Ireland) Aidan Seaver
- (Netherlands) Rizwan Akram
- (Netherlands) Nitin Bathi
- (Oman) Rahul Asher
- (Pakistan) Saleema Imtiaz
- (Qatar) Shivani Mishra
- (South Africa) Kerrin Klaaste
- (Sri Lanka) Dedunu Silva
- (United States) Vijaya Mallela
- (Cricket West Indies) Maria Abbott
- (Cricket West Indies) Candace La Borde
- (Zimbabwe) Forster Mutizwa

== Warm-up matches ==
The warm-up matches were played from 13 January to 15 January 2024, involving all teams.

Warm-up matches

Warm-up match 1
13 January 2025
10:30 UTC+8
Scorecard

India; 164/7 (20 overs)	v	Scotland; 45 (18.5 overs)
G Kamalini 32 (23); Ammy Baldie 2/13 (3 overs)		Pippa Kelly 11 (23); Sonam Yadav 2/0 (1 over)

India won by 119 runs
Selangor Turf Club Cricket ground, Kuala Lumpur
Umpires: Shathira Jakir (Ban) and Aidan Seaver (Ire)
Player of the match: Niki Prasad (Ind)

- Scotland won the toss and elected to field.

Warm-up match 2
13 January 2025
10:30 UTC+8
Scorecard

Pakistan; 105/6 (20 overs)	v	Nigeria; 94/6 (20 overs)
Fatima Khan 28 (39); Piety Lucky 2/23 (4 overs)		Victory Igbinedion 46 (57); Quratulain 2/9 (4 overs)

Pakistan won by 11 runs
YSD-UKM Cricket Oval, Bangi
Umpires: Rahul Asher (Oma) and Dedunu Silva (SL)

- Nigeria won the toss and elected to field.

Warm-up match 3
13 January 2025
10:30 UTC+8
Scorecard

Australia; 161/5 (20 overs)	v	Malaysia; 21 (11 overs)
Lucy Hamilton 52 (41); Nur Dania Syuhada 3/25 (4 overs)		Nur Isma Dania 4 (7); Eleanor Larosa 2/2 (2 overs)

Australia won by 140 runs
Royal Selangor Club Cricket Ground, Kuala Lumpur
Umpires: Shivani Mishra (Qat) and Vijaya Mallela (USA)

- Malaysia won the toss and elected to field.

Warm-up match 4
13 January 2025
10:30 UTC+8
Scorecard

United States; 120/8 (20 overs)	v	New Zealand; 107/9 (20 overs)
Ritu Singh 36 (27); Hannah O'Connor 1/8 (2 overs)		Eve Wolland 25 (26); Saanvi Immadi 3/16 (4 overs)

United States won by 13 runs
Kolej Tunku Jaafar Ground, Mantin, Negeri Sembilan

- New Zealand won the toss and elected to field.

Warm-up match 5
13 January 2025
14:30 UTC+8
Scorecard

MCA Invitation XI; 30/4 (20 overs)	v	Ireland; 158/0 (18.5 overs)
Azib Wajdi Zainuddin 9* (20); Kia McCartney 1/2 (3 overs)		Rebecca Lowe 26 (16)

Ireland won by 10 wickets
Selangor Turf Club Cricket ground, Kuala Lumpur

- MCA Invitation XI won the toss and elected to bat.

Warm-up match 6
13 January 2025
14:30 UTC+8
Scorecard

Samoa; 80/8 (20 overs)	v	England; 83/1 (10.1 overs)
Fetu Mapu 28* (42); Charlotte Stubbs 2/6 (2 overs)		Erin Thomas 34* (21)

England won by 9 wickets
YSD-UKM Cricket Oval, Bangi
Umpires: Saleema Imtiaz (Pak) and Kerrin Klaaste (SA)

- Samoa won the toss and elected to bat.

Warm-up match 7
13 January 2025
14:30 UTC+8
Scorecard

Sri Lanka; 124/3 (20 overs)	v	Bangladesh; 125/6 (18.3 overs)
Manudi Nanayakkara 31* (26); Farjana Easmin 1/20 (20 overs)		Juairiya Ferdous 55* (42); Rashmika Sewwandi 2/20 (3.3 overs)

Bangladesh won by 4 wickets
Royal Selangor Club Cricket Ground, Kuala Lumpur
Umpires: Candace La Borde (WI) and Nitin Bathi (Ned)

- Sri Lanka won the toss and elected to bat.

Warm-up match 8
13 January 2025
14:30 UTC+8
Scorecard

West Indies; 109/4 (20 overs)	v	Nepal; 100 (19.1 overs)
Samara Ramnath 25 (33); Rachana Chaudhary 1/17 (4 overs)		Seemana KC 23 (19); Trisha Hardat 2/9 (4 overs)

West Indies won by 9 runs
Kolej Tunku Jaafar Ground, Mantin, Negeri Sembilan

- West Indies won the toss and elected to bat.

Warm-up match 9
15 January 2025
10:30 UTC+8
Scorecard

England; 113/9 (20 overs)	v	Bangladesh; 113 (20 overs)
Prisha Thanawala 28 (24); Anisa Akter Soba 3/12 (4 overs)		Sadia Akter 20 (16); Phoebe Brett 3/32 (4 overs)

Match tied (Bangladesh won the Super Over)
Selangor Turf Club Cricket ground, Kuala Lumpur
Umpires: Ashlee Gibbons (Aus) and Gayathri Venugopalan (Ind)

- England won the toss and elected to bat.
- Super Over: Bangladesh 11/0, England 9/1

Warm-up match 10
15 January 2025
10:30 UTC+8
Scorecard

New Zealand; 151/2 (20 overs)	v	West Indies; 72 (18.5 overs)
Emma McLeod 50 (42)		Brianna Harricharan 16 (22); Anika Todd 2/3 (1 over)

New Zealand won by 79 runs
YSD-UKM Cricket Oval, Bangi
Umpires: Rahul Asher (Oma) and Kerrin Klaaste (SA)

- New Zealand won the toss and elected to bat.

Warm-up match 11
15 January 2025
10:30 UTC+8
Scorecard

Nepal; 58/9 (20 overs)	v	United States; 59/5 (14 overs)
Sana Praveen 12 (25); Isani Vaghela 1/4 (1 over)		Isani Vaghela 24 (28); Riya Sharma 3/15 (4 overs)

United States won by 5 wickets
Royal Selangor Club Cricket Ground, Kuala Lumpur
Umpires: Candace La Borde (WI) and Nitin Bathi (Ned)

- United States won the toss and elected to field.

Warm-up match 12
15 January 2025
10:30 UTC+8
Scorecard

Sri Lanka; 114 (18.2 overs)	v	Samoa; 38 (12.4 overs)
Sumudu Nisansala 23 (19); Jane Manase 3/23 (4 overs)		Olive Lefaga Lemoe 7 (20); Limansa Thilakaratne 5/6 (2.4 overs)

Sri Lanka won by 76 runs
Kolej Tunku Jaafar Ground, Mantin, Negeri Sembilan
Umpires: Maria Abbott (WI) and Forster Mutizwa (Zim)

- Sri Lanka won the toss and elected to bat.

Warm-up match 13
15 January 2025
14:30 UTC+8
Scorecard

Australia; 137/2 (20 overs)	v	Pakistan; 66/7 (16 overs)
Kate Pelle 41 (38); Shahar Bano 1/4 (1 over)		Komal Khan 14 (18); Juliette Morton 3/7 (3 over)

Australia won by 54 runs (DLS method)
Selangor Turf Club Cricket ground, Kuala Lumpur
Umpires: Shathira Jakir (Ban) and Gayathri Venugopalan (Ind)

- Pakistan won the toss and elected to field.

Warm-up match 14
15 January 2025
14:30 UTC+8
Scorecard

South Africa; 129/5 (19.4 overs)	v	India; 109/4 (13.3 overs)
Kayla Reyneke 47 (26); Shabnam Shakil 1/8 (2 overs)		Gongadi Trisha 32 (20); Monalisa Legodi 2/19 (2.3 overs)

India won by 6 wickets (DLS method)
YSD-UKM Cricket Oval, Bangi
Umpires: Saleema Imtiaz (Pak) and Dedunu Silva (SL)

- South Africa won the toss and elected to bat.

Warm-up match 15
15 January 2025
14:30 UTC+8
Scorecard

Scotland; 62 (18.2 overs)	v	Nigeria; 64/3 (11.3 overs)
Pippa Sproul 25 (33); Lilian Ude 3/15 (4 overs)		Piety Lucky 28* (16); Mollie Parker 1/5 (2 overs)

Nigeria won by 7 wickets
Royal Selangor Club Cricket Ground, Kuala Lumpur
Umpires: Vijaya Mallela (USA) and Shivani Mishra (Qat)

- Nigeria won the toss and elected to field.

Warm-up match 16
15 January 2025
14:30 UTC+8
Scorecard

Malaysia; 70/9 (20 overs)	v	Ireland; 73/5 (13.4 overs)
Irdina Beh 14 (32); Niamh MacNulty 3/14 (4 overs)		Abbi Harrison 21* (26); Suabika 1/11 (4 overs)

Ireland won by 5 wickets
Kolej Tunku Jaafar Ground, Mantin, Negeri Sembilan
Umpires: Rizwan Akram (Ned) and Narayanan Janani (Ind)

- Malaysia won the toss and elected to bat.

== Group stage ==
=== Group A ===
Pos	Team	Pld	W	L	T	NR	Pts	NRR	Qualification
1	India	3	3	0	0	0	6	5.035	Advanced to the Super 6
2	Sri Lanka	3	2	1	0	0	4	2.667	Advanced to the Super 6
3	West Indies	3	1	2	0	0	2	−2.119	Advanced to the Super 6
4	Malaysia (H)	3	0	3	0	0	0	−5.261	Advanced to the play-offs

Source: ESPNcricinfo
(H) Host

==== Fixtures ====
19 January 2025
10:30
Scorecard

Sri Lanka; 162/6 (20 overs)	v	Malaysia; 23 (14.1 overs)
Dahami Sanethma 55 (52); Siti Nazwah 2/31 (4 overs)		Nur Aliya 7 (25); Chamudi Praboda 3/5 (4 overs)

Sri Lanka won by 139 runs
Bayuemas Oval, Pandamaran
Umpires: Narayanan Janani (Ind) and Aidan Seaver (Ire)
Player of the match: Dahami Sanethma (SL)

- Malaysia won the toss and elected to field.

19 January 2025
14:30
Scorecard

West Indies; 44 (13.2 overs)	v	India; 47/1 (4.2 overs)
Kenika Cassar 15 (29); Parunika Sisodia 3/7 (2.2 overs)		Sanika Chalke 18* (11); Jahzara Claxton 1/18 (2 overs)

India won by 9 wickets
Bayuemas Oval, Pandamaran
Umpires: Shathira Jakir (Ban) and Dedunu Silva (SL)
Player of the match: VJ Joshitha (Ind)

- India won the toss and elected to field.

21 January 2025
10:30
Scorecard

Sri Lanka; 166/5 (20 overs)	v	West Indies; 85 (19.4 overs)
Sanjana Kavindi 38 (36); Selena Ross 2/25 (4 overs)		Samara Ramnath 24 (23); Chamudi Praboda 3/16 (4 overs)

Sri Lanka won by 81 runs
Bayuemas Oval, Pandamaran
Umpires: Ashlee Gibbons (Aus) and Gayathri Venugopalan (Ind)
Player of the match: Chamudi Praboda (SL)

- Sri Lanka won the toss and elected to bat.

21 January 2025
14:30
Scorecard

Malaysia; 31 (14.3 overs)	v	India; 32/0 (2.5 overs)
Nazatul Hidayah Husna 5 (10); Vaishnavi Sharma 5/5 (4 overs)		Gongadi Trisha 27* (12)

India won by 10 wickets
Bayuemas Oval, Pandamaran
Umpires: Rizwan Akram (Ned) and Vijaya Mallela (USA)
Player of the match: Vaishnavi Sharma (Ind)

- India won the toss and elected to field.

23 January 2025
10:30
Scorecard

West Indies; 112/7 (20 overs)	v	Malaysia; 59 (18 overs)
Asabi Callender 30 (42); Nur Izzatul Syafiqa 2/26 (3 overs)		Nur Dania Syuhada 12 (17); Samara Ramnath 4/6 (4 overs)

West Indies won by 53 runs
Bayuemas Oval, Pandamaran
Umpires: Dedunu Silva (SL) and Gayathri Venugopalan (Ind)
Player of the match: Samara Ramnath (WI)

- Malaysia won the toss and elected to field.

23 January 2025
14:30
Scorecard

India; 118/9 (20 overs)	v	Sri Lanka; 58/9 (20 overs)
Gongadi Trisha 49 (44); Pramudi Methsara 2/10 (3 overs)		Rashmika Sewwandi 15 (12); Parunika Sisodia 2/7 (4 overs)

India won by 60 runs
Bayuemas Oval, Pandamaran
Umpires: Vijaya Mallela (USA) and Aidan Seaver (Ire)
Player of the match: Gongadi Trisha (Ind)

- Sri Lanka won the toss and elected to field.

=== Group B ===
Pos	Team	Pld	W	L	T	NR	Pts	NRR	Qualification
1	England	3	2	0	0	1	5	3.276	Advanced to the Super 6
2	United States	3	1	1	0	1	3	0.995	Advanced to the Super 6
3	Ireland	3	1	1	0	1	3	−2.324	Advanced to the Super 6
4	Pakistan	3	0	2	0	1	1	−3.271	Advanced to the play-offs

Source: ESPNcricinfo

==== Fixtures ====
18 January 2025
10:30
Scorecard

England; 144/7 (20 overs)	v	Ireland; 28/2 (3.5 overs)
Jemima Spence 37 (27); Ellie McGee 2/20 (3 overs)		Rebecca Lowe 16* (11); Charlotte Lambert 1/4 (0.5 over)

No result
Johor Cricket Academy Oval, Johor
Umpires: Rahul Asher (Oma) and Shivani Mishra (Qat)

- Ireland won the toss and elected to field.
- No further play was possible due to rain.

18 January 2025
14:30
Scorecard

Pakistan	v	United States

Match abandoned
Johor Cricket Academy Oval, Johor
Umpires: Kerrin Klaaste (SA) and Candace La Borde (WI)

- No toss.
- No play was possible due to rain.

20 January 2025
10:30
Scorecard

Ireland; 75 (17.4 overs)	v	United States; 79/1 (9.4 overs)
Alice Walsh 15 (12); Isani Vaghela 3/10 (3 overs)		Disha Dhingra 46 (33); Lara McBride 1/9 (0.4 overs)

United States won by 9 wickets
Johor Cricket Academy Oval, Johor
Umpires: Kerrin Klaaste (SA) and Shivani Mishra (Qat)
Player of the match: Isani Vaghela (USA)

- Ireland won the toss and elected to bat.

20 January 2025
14:30
Scorecard

Pakistan; 66 (18.5 overs)	v	England; 67/4 (9.2 overs)
Zoofishan Ayyaz 15 (13); Amuruthaa Surenkumar 3/17 (3 overs)		Katie Jones 20* (16); Mahnoor Zeb 2/23 (3.2 overs)

England won by 6 wickets
Johor Cricket Academy Oval, Johor
Umpires: Rahul Asher (Oma) and Candace La Borde (WI)
Player of the match: Katie Jones (Eng)

- England won the toss and elected to field.

22 January 2025
10:30
Scorecard

United States; 119/5 (20 overs)	v	England; 120/2 (14.2 overs)
Anika Kolan 46* (42); Trudy Johnson 2/17 (4 overs)		Davina Perrin 74 (45); Maahi Madhavan 1/11 (2 overs)

England won by 8 wickets
Johor Cricket Academy Oval, Johor
Umpires: Candace La Borde (WI) and Shivani Mishra (Qat)
Player of the match: Davina Perrin (Eng)

- England won the toss and elected to field.

22 January 2025
14:30
Scorecard

Ireland; 69/5 (9 overs)	v	Pakistan; 59/7 (9 overs)
Alice Walsh 31 (19); Memoona Khalid 2/6 (1 over)		Komal Khan 12 (12); Ellie McGee 2/13 (2 overs)

Ireland won by 13 runs (DLS method)
Johor Cricket Academy Oval, Johor
Umpires: Rahul Asher (Oma) and Kerrin Klaaste (SA)
Player of the match: Alice Walsh (Ire)

- Ireland won the toss and elected to bat.
- The match was reduced to 9 overs per side due to rain.
- Pakistan were set a revised target of 73 runs from 9 overs.

=== Group C ===
Pos	Team	Pld	W	L	T	NR	Pts	NRR	Qualification
1	South Africa	3	3	0	0	0	6	5.576	Advanced to the Super 6
2	Nigeria	3	1	1	0	1	3	−1.857	Advanced to the Super 6
3	New Zealand	3	1	2	0	0	2	1.049	Advanced to the Super 6
4	Samoa	3	0	2	0	1	1	−5.129	Advanced to the play-offs

Source: ESPNcricinfo

==== Fixtures ====
18 January 2025
10:30
Scorecard

Nigeria	v	Samoa

Match abandoned
Borneo Cricket Ground, Sarawak
Umpires: Nitin Bathi (Ned) and Saleema Imtiaz (Pak)

- No toss.
- No play was possible due to rain.

18 January 2025
14:30
Scorecard

South Africa; 91/7 (11 overs)	v	New Zealand; 69/5 (11 overs)
Jemma Botha 32 (24); Ayaan Lambat 3/6 (2 overs)		Emma McLeod 34 (25); Monalisa Legodi 2/8 (2 overs)

South Africa won by 22 runs
Borneo Cricket Ground, Sarawak
Umpires: Maria Abbott (WI) and Forster Mutizwa (Zim)
Player of the match: Jemma Botha (SA)

- New Zealand won the toss and elected to field.
- The match was reduced to 11 overs per side due to rain.

20 January 2025
10:30
Scorecard

Nigeria; 65/6 (13 overs)	v	New Zealand; 63/6 (13 overs)
Lilian Ude 19 (25); Hannah Francis 1/4 (1 over)		Anika Todd 19 (27); Peace Usen 1/5 (2 overs)

Nigeria won by 2 runs
Borneo Cricket Ground, Sarawak
Umpires: Nitin Bathi (Ned) and Forster Mutizwa (Zim)
Player of the match: Piety Lucky (Nga)

- New Zealand won the toss and elected to field.
- The match was reduced to 13 overs per side due to a wet outfield.

20 January 2025
14:30
Scorecard

Samoa; 16 (9.1 overs)	v	South Africa; 17/0 (1.4 overs)
Stella Sagalala 3 (7); Nthabiseng Nini 3/4 (2 overs)		Jemma Botha 6* (4)

South Africa won by 10 wickets
Borneo Cricket Ground, Sarawak
Umpires: Maria Abbott (WI) and Saleema Imtiaz (Pak)
Player of the match: Nthabiseng Nini (SA)

- South Africa won the toss and elected to field.

22 January 2025
10:30
Scorecard

New Zealand; 107/9 (17 overs)	v	Samoa; 40 (14.2 overs)
Eve Wolland 48 (43); Olive Lefaga 3/13 (4 overs)		Angel Sootaga 8 (7); Tash Wakelin 3/3 (2.2 overs)

New Zealand won by 67 runs
Borneo Cricket Ground, Sarawak
Umpires: Maria Abbott (WI) and Nitin Bathi (Ned)
Player of the match: Eve Wolland (NZ)

- Samoa won the toss and elected to field.
- The match was reduced to 17 overs per side due to wet outfield.

22 January 2025
14:30
Scorecard

South Africa; 49/2 (8 overs)	v	Nigeria; 24/8 (8 overs)
Simone Lourens 25 (29); Lucky Piety 2/12 (1 overs)		Ude Lilian 6 (12); Seshnie Naidu 2/1 (1 over)

South Africa won by 41 runs (DLS method)
Borneo Cricket Ground, Sarawak
Umpires: Saleema Imtiaz (Pak) and Forster Mutizwa (Zim)
Player of the match: Seshnie Naidu (SA)

- Nigeria won the toss and elected to field.
- The match was reduced to 8 overs per side due to rain.
- Nigeria were set a revised target of 66 runs from 8 overs.

=== Group D ===
Pos	Team	Pld	W	L	T	NR	Pts	NRR	Qualification
1	Australia	3	3	0	0	0	6	2.837	Advanced to the Super 6
2	Bangladesh	3	2	1	0	0	4	0.787	Advanced to the Super 6
3	Scotland	3	1	2	0	0	2	−1.350	Advanced to the Super 6
4	Nepal	3	0	3	0	0	0	−2.099	Advanced to the play-offs

Source: ESPNcricinfo

==== Fixtures ====
18 January 2025
10:30
Scorecard

Scotland; 48 (15.1 overs)	v	Australia; 49/1 (6.4 overs)
Emma Walsingham 12 (31); Caoimhe Bray 3/1 (3.1 overs)		Kate Pelle 29* (18); Nayma Sheikh 1/2 (1 over)

Australia won by 9 wickets
YSD-UKM Cricket Oval, Bangi
Umpires: Vijaya Mallela (USA) and Gayathri Venugopalan (Ind)
Player of the match: Caoimhe Bray (Aus)

- Australia won the toss and elected to field.

18 January 2025
14:30
Scorecard

Nepal; 52 (18.2 overs)	v	Bangladesh; 53/5 (13.2 overs)
Sana Praveen 19 (32); Jannatul Maoua 2/11 (4 overs)		Sadia Islam 16 (24); Seemana KC 1/10 (3 overs); Riya Sharma 1/10 (3 overs)

Bangladesh won by 5 wickets
YSD-UKM Cricket Oval, Bangi
Umpires: Rizwan Akram (Ned) and Ashlee Gibbons (Aus)
Player of the match: Jannatul Maoua (Ban)

- Bangladesh won the toss and elected to field.

20 January 2025
10:30
Scorecard

Bangladesh; 91/9 (20 overs)	v	Australia; 92/8 (19.2 overs)
Afia Ashima 29 (34); Tegan Williamson 2/12 (4 overs)		Lucy Hamilton 30 (35); Jannatul Maoua 3/14 (4 overs)

Australia won by 2 wickets
YSD-UKM Cricket Oval, Bangi
Umpires: Aidan Seaver (Ire) and Dedunu Silva (SL)
Player of the match: Lucy Hamilton (Aus)

- Australia won the toss and elected to field.

20 January 2025
14:30
Scorecard

Nepal; 73 (18.5 overs)	v	Scotland; 74/9 (18.4 overs)
Puja Mahato 27 (43); Maisie Maceira 5/15 (3.5 overs)		Pippa Sproul 35 (47); Rachana Chaudhary 2/13 (3 overs)

Scotland won by 1 wicket
YSD-UKM Cricket Oval, Bangi
Umpires: Shathira Jakir (Ban) and Narayanan Janani (Ind)
Player of the match: Maisie Maceira (Sco)

- Nepal won the toss and elected to bat.

22 January 2025
10:30
Scorecard

Bangladesh; 121/9 (20 overs)	v	Scotland; 103/8 (20 overs)
Sumaiya Akter 29* (36); Nayma Sheikh 2/15 (4 overs)		Pippa Sproul 43 (41); Anisa Akter Soba 4/25 (4 overs)

Bangladesh won by 18 runs
YSD-UKM Cricket Oval, Bangi
Umpires: Ashlee Gibbons (Aus) and Narayanan Janani (Ind)
Player of the match: Anisa Akter Soba (Ban)

- Scotland won the toss and elected to field.

22 January 2025
14:30
Scorecard

Australia; 139/6 (20 overs)	v	Nepal; 56/8 (20 overs)
Caoimhe Bray 45 (34); Puja Mahato 3/31 (4 overs)		Puja Mahato 18 (42); Lily Bassingthwaighte 2/4 (3 overs)

Australia won by 83 runs
YSD-UKM Cricket Oval, Bangi
Umpires: Rizwan Akram (Ned) and Shathira Jakir (Ban)
Player of the match: Caoimhe Bray (Aus)

- Australia won the toss and elected to bat.

== Super 6 ==
=== Group 1 ===
==== Points table ====
Pos	Team	Pld	W	L	T	NR	Pts	NRR	Qualification
1	India	4	4	0	0	0	8	5.724	Advanced to the semi-finals
2	Australia	4	3	1	0	0	6	1.377	Advanced to the semi-finals
3	Sri Lanka	4	2	1	0	1	5	0.550	
4	Bangladesh	4	2	2	0	0	4	−0.500	
5	Scotland	4	0	3	0	1	1	−4.595	
6	West Indies	4	0	4	0	0	0	−4.153	

Source: ESPNcricinfo

==== Fixtures ====
25 January 2025
14:30
Scorecard

West Indies; 53 (16.3 overs)	v	Australia; 57/3 (10.5 overs)
Brianna Harricharan 17 (29); Eleanor Larosa 2/6 (3 overs)		Lucy Hamilton 28 (29); Erin Deane 1/5 (2 overs)

Australia won by 7 wickets
YSD-UKM Cricket Oval, Bangi
Umpires: Nitin Bathi (Ned) and Aidan Seaver (Ire)
Player of the match: Eleanor Larosa (Aus)

- Australia won the toss and elected to field.

26 January 2025
10:30
Scorecard

Scotland	v	Sri Lanka

Match abandoned
Bayuemas Oval, Pandamaran
Umpires: Candace la Borde (WI) and Aidan Seaver (Ire)

- No toss.
- No play was possible due to rain.

26 January 2025
14:30
Scorecard

Bangladesh; 64/8 (20 overs)	v	India; 66/2 (7.1 overs)
Sumaiya Akter 21* (29); Vaishnavi Sharma 3/15 (4 overs)		Gongadi Trisha 40 (31); Habiba Islam 1/15 (2 overs)

India won by 8 wickets
Bayuemas Oval, Pandamaran
Umpires: Ashlee Gibbons (Aus) and Saleema Imtiaz (Pak)
Player of the match: Vaishnavi Sharma (Ind)

- India won the toss and elected to field.

28 January 2025
10:30
Scorecard

West Indies; 54/6 (13 overs)	v	Bangladesh; 55/0 (8.5 overs)
Amrita Ramtahal 16 (23); Nishita Akter Nishi 3/11 (3 overs)		Juairiya Ferdous 25* (28)

Bangladesh won by 10 wickets
Bayuemas Oval, Pandamaran
Umpires: Nitin Bathi (Ned) and Saleema Imtiaz (Pak)
Player of the match: Nishita Akter Nishi (Ban)

- Bangladesh won the toss and elected to field.
- The match was reduced to 13 overs per side due to rain.

28 January 2025
14:30
Scorecard

India; 208/1 (20 overs)	v	Scotland; 58 (14 overs)
Gongadi Trisha 110* (59); Maisie Maceira 1/25 (4 overs)		Pippa Kelly 12 (8); Aayushi Shukla 4/8 (3 overs)

India won by 150 runs
Bayuemas Oval, Pandamaran
Umpires: Maria Abbott (WI) and Kerrin Klaaste (SA)
Player of the match: Gongadi Trisha (Ind)

- Scotland won the toss and elected to field.
- Gongadi Trisha (Ind) scored her maiden century in YWT20I. She also became the first player to score a century in the history of U19 Women's T20 World Cup.

29 January 2025
14:30
Scorecard

Sri Lanka; 99/8 (20 overs)	v	Australia; 87/8 (20 overs)
Sanjana Kavindi 19 (35); Lily Bassingthwaighte 3/7 (4 overs)		Caoimhe Bray 27 (32); Aseni Thalagune 2/18 (3 overs)

Sri Lanka won by 12 runs
YSD-UKM Cricket Oval, Bangi
Umpires: Candace la Borde (WI) and Forster Mutizwa (Zim)
Player of the match: Limansa Thilakaratne (SL)

- Sri Lanka won the toss and elected to bat.

=== Group 2 ===
==== Points table ====
Pos	Team	Pld	W	L	T	NR	Pts	NRR	Qualification
1	South Africa	4	3	0	0	1	7	3.215	Advanced to the semi-finals
2	England	4	2	0	0	2	6	2.877	Advanced to the semi-finals
3	Nigeria	4	2	1	0	1	5	−0.805	
4	United States	4	1	2	0	1	3	0.203	
5	New Zealand	4	1	3	0	0	2	−0.870	
6	Ireland	4	0	3	0	1	1	−1.873	

Source: ESPNcricinfo

==== Fixtures ====
25 January 2025
10:30
Scorecard

New Zealand; 97 (19.5 overs)	v	United States; 79 (17.1 overs)
Hannah Francis 25 (33); Ritu Singh 5/15 (3.5 overs)		Disha Dhingra 30 (24); Rishika Jaswal 2/14 (4 overs)

New Zealand won by 18 runs
YSD-UKM Cricket Oval, Bangi
Umpires: Maria Abbott (WI) and Forster Mutizwa (Zim)
Player of the match: Ritu Singh (USA)

- United States won the toss and elected to field.

25 January 2025
10:30
Scorecard

England	v	Nigeria

Match abandoned
Borneo Cricket Ground, Sarawak
Umpires: Rizwan Akram (Ned) and Gayathri Venugopalan (Ind)

- No toss.
- No play was possible due to rain.

25 January 2025
14:30
Scorecard

Ireland; 35 (9.4 overs)	v	South Africa; 36/3 (6.1 overs)
Freya Sargent 9 (8); Monalisa Legodi 4/4 (2 overs)		Kayla Reyneke 16* (17); Jennifer Jackson 2/6 (2 overs)

South Africa won by 7 wickets
Borneo Cricket Ground, Sarawak
Umpires: Shathira Jakir (Ban) and Dedunu Silva (SL)
Player of the match: Monalisa Legodi (SA)

- Ireland won the toss and elected to bat.
- The match was reduced to 10 overs due to rain.

27 January 2025
10:30
Scorecard

New Zealand; 89 (20 overs)	v	England; 90/4 (11.4 overs)
Kate Irwin 35 (26); Matilda Corteen-Coleman 4/8 (4 overs)		Jemima Spence 29 (18); Rishika Jaswal 2/22 (3.4 overs)

England won by 6 wickets
Borneo Cricket Ground, Sarawak
Umpires: Rizwan Akram (Ned) and Shathira Jakir (Ban)
Player of the match: Matilda Corteen-Coleman (Eng)

- England won the toss and elected to field.

28 January 2025
10:30
Scorecard

South Africa	v	United States

Match abandoned
Borneo Cricket Ground, Sarawak
Umpires: Dedunu Silva (SL) and Gayathri Venugopalan (Ind)

- No toss.
- No play was possible due to rain.

29 January 2025
10:30
Scorecard

Nigeria; 94/7 (20 overs)	v	Ireland; 88 (18.4 overs)
Christabel Chukwuonye 25 (42); Kia McCartney 2/13 (4 overs)		Rebecca Lowe 21 (32); Lilian Ude 3/11 (4 overs)

Nigeria won by 6 runs
YSD-UKM Cricket Oval, Bangi
Umpires: Ashlee Gibbons (Aus) and Vijaya Mallela (USA)
Player of the match: Lilian Ude (Nga)

- Ireland won the toss and elected to field.

== 13th–16th place play-offs ==
24 January 2025
10:30
Scorecard

Pakistan; 136/8 (20 overs)	v	Samoa; 84 (18.5 overs)
Maham Anees 28 (42); Norah Jade Salima 3/20 (4 overs)		Verra Farane 19 (18); Haniah Ahmer 4/17 (4 overs)

Pakistan won by 52 runs
Johor Cricket Academy Oval, Johor
Umpires: Rahul Asher (Oma) and Shivani Mishra (Qat)
Player of the match: Haniah Ahmer (Pak)

- Samoa won the toss and elected to field.

24 January 2025
14:30
Scorecard

Malaysia; 45 (16.5 overs)	v	Nepal; 47/3 (11 overs)
Nuriman Hidayah 15 (23); Puja Mahato 4/9 (3.5 overs)		Puja Mahato 23* (32); Marsya Qistina Binti Abdullah 3/18 (4 overs)

Nepal won by 7 wickets
Johor Cricket Academy Oval, Johor
Umpires: Narayanan Janani (Ind) and Kerrin Klaaste (SA)
Player of the match: Puja Mahato (Nep)

- Nepal won the toss and elected to field.

== Knockout stage ==
=== Bracket ===
Semi-final
B1	South Africa	106/5 (18.1 overs)
A2	Australia	105/8 (20 overs)
A1	India	117/1 (15 overs)
B2	England	113/8 (20 overs)

Final
SFW1	South Africa	82 (20 overs)
SFW2	India	84/1 (11.2 overs)

=== Semi-final ===
==== 1st Semi-final ====
31 January 2025
10:30
Scorecard

Australia; 105/8 (20 overs)	v	South Africa; 106/5 (18.1 overs)
Caoimhe Bray 36 (44); Ashleigh van Wyk 4/17 (3 overs)		Jemma Botha 37 (24); Lucy Hamilton 2/17 (4 overs)

South Africa won by 5 wickets
Bayuemas Oval, Pandamaran
Umpires: Nitin Bathi (Ned) and Gayathri Venugopalan (Ind)
Player of the match: Ashleigh van Wyk (SA)

- Australia won the toss and elected to bat.

==== 2nd Semi-final ====
31 January 2025
14:30
Scorecard

England; 113/8 (20 overs)	v	India; 117/1 (15 overs)
Davina Perrin 45 (40); Parunika Sisodia 3/21 (4 overs)		G Kamalini 56* (50); Phoebe Brett 1/30 (4 overs)

India won by 9 wickets
Bayuemas Oval, Pandamaran
Umpires: Ashlee Gibbons (Aus) and Kerrin Klaaste (SA)
Player of the match: Parunika Sisodia (Ind)

- England won the toss and elected to bat.

=== Final ===
2 February 2025
14:30
Scorecard

South Africa; 82 (20 overs)	v	India; 84/1 (11.2 overs)
Mieke van Voorst 23 (18); Gongadi Trisha 3/15 (4 overs)		Gongadi Trisha 44* (33); Kayla Reyneke 1/14 (4 overs)

India won by 9 wickets
Bayuemas Oval, Pandamaran
Umpires: Nitin Bathi (Ned) and Ashlee Gibbons (Aus)
Player of the match: Gongadi Trisha (Ind)

- South Africa won the toss and elected to bat.

== Final standings ==
Pos.	Team
1st	India
2nd	South Africa
3rd	Australia
4th	England
5th	Sri Lanka
6th	Nigeria
7th	Bangladesh
8th	United States
9th	New Zealand
10th	Scotland
11th	Ireland
12th	West Indies
13th	Pakistan
14th	Nepal
15th	Samoa
16th	Malaysia

== Records and statistics ==
- Highest score by a team: India – 208/1 (20 overs) v Scotland (28 January).
- Top score by an individual: Gongadi Trisha (India) – 110* (59) v Scotland (28 January).
- Best bowling figures by an individual: Vaishnavi Sharma (India) – 5/5 (4 overs) v Malaysia (21 January).

=== Most runs ===
Player	Team	Matches	Innings	Runs	Average	HS	100s	50s
Gongadi Trisha	India	7	7	309	77.25	110*	1	0
Davina Perrin	England	5	5	176	35.20	74	0	1
G Kamalini	India	7	7	143	35.75	56*	0	2
Caoimhe Bray	Australia	6	5	119	29.75	45	0	1
Jemma Botha	South Africa	6	6	105	26.25	37	0	0
Source: ESPNcricinfo

=== Most wickets ===
Player	Team	Overs	Wickets	Average	BBI	5w
Vaishnavi Sharma	India	22.0	17	4.35	5/5	1
Aayushi Shukla	India	26.3	14	5.71	4/8	0
Kayla Reyneke	South Africa	16.4	11	6.27	3/2	0
Parunika Sisodia	India	21.2	10	5.80	3/7	0
Hasrat Gill	Australia	21.0	10	8.50	2/9	0
Source: ESPNcricinfo

=== Team of the tournament ===
The ICC announced its team of the tournament on 3 February 2025, with Gongadi Trisha being named as player of the tournament, and Kayla Reyneke as the captain of the team.

- (India) Gongadi Trisha
- (South Africa) Jemma Botha
- (England) Davina Perrin
- (India) G Kamalini
- (Australia) Caoimhe Bray
- (Nepal) Puja Mahato
- (South Africa) Kayla Reyneke (c)
- (England) Katie Jones (wk)
- (India) Aayushi Shukla
- (Sri Lanka) Chamodi Praboda
- (India) Vaishnavi Sharma
- (South Africa) Nthabiseng Nini (12th woman)
