= 2027 Under-19 Women's T20 World Cup squads =

List of cricket squads

The 2027 Under-19 Women's T20 World Cup will be the third edition of the Under-19 Women's T20 World Cup, a biennial world cup for women's national under-19 teams organised by International Cricket Council (ICC) in Twenty20 format. It is scheduled to be held in Bangladesh and Nepal in January/February 2027. Sixteen teams are set to compete in 41 matches, with the squads of the participating teams listed below.

On 24 September 2026, England became the first team to announce their squad for the tournament.

== Group D ==
=== England ===
- Squad announcement date: 24 September 2026
- Coach: (England) Chris Guest
- Maria Andrews
- Amelie Bishop
- Phoebe Brett
- Eliza Bristowe
- Flora Davies
- Holly Garton
- Bryony Gillgrass
- Genevieve Jeer
- Amelia Oliver
- Shristi Patil
- Prarthana Reddy
- Faith Teekasingh
- Clara Thaker
- Skye Thomas (wk)
- Venus Weerappuli
