= Shashini Gimhani =

Sri Lankan cricketer (born 2008)

Personal information
- Full name: Wellage Shashini Gimhani Wijayarathna
- Born: 9 December 2008 (age 17); Mahamodara, Sri Lanka
- Batting: Right-handed
- Bowling: Left-arm wrist spin
- Role: Bowler

International information
- National side: Sri Lanka
- T20I debut (cap 55): 1 May 2024 v Uganda
- Last T20I: 3 May 2024 v United States
- T20I shirt no.: 21

Domestic team information
- Years: Team
- 2023–present: Colombo District
Medal record
Representing Sri Lanka
Women's Cricket
Women's Asia Cup
Winner	2024 Sri Lanka
- Source: Cricinfo, 11 May 2024

Wellage Shashini Gimhani Wijayarathna (born 9 December 2008, known as Shashini Gimhani) is a Sri Lankan cricketer who plays for the Sri Lanka women's cricket team as a left-arm wrist spinner. She has also played for the Sri Lanka women's under-19 cricket team.

== Early life ==
Gimhani studied at Devapathiraja College in Rathgama, Galle.

== Career ==
In March 2024, Gimhani was selected in the Sri Lanka under-19 team for the Tri-Nation Series against England under-19 and Australia under-19 teams.

In April 2024, she earned her maiden call-up for Sri Lanka's national squad for the 2024 ICC Women's T20 World Cup Qualifier. She made her Twenty20 International (T20I) debut against Uganda on 1 May 2024. She became the youngest player for Sri Lanka to represent the national team at the age of 15 years and 144 days. She was named in the Sri Lanka squad for the 2024 ICC Women's T20 World Cup, and for the 2025 ICC Under-19 Women's T20 World Cup.
