= 2027 Under-19 Women's T20 World Cup =

Cricket tournament

2027 ICC Under-19 Women's T20 World Cup
- Dates: 21 January – 6 February 2027
- Administrator: International Cricket Council
- Cricket format: 20 overs/Y-WT20I
- Tournament format(s): Group stage, Super 6s and Knockout stage
- Hosts: Bangladesh; Nepal
- Participants: 16
- Matches: 41

The 2027 ICC Under-19 Women's T20 World Cup will be the third edition of the Under-19 Women's T20 World Cup, scheduled to be hosted by Bangladesh and Nepal in 2027. Schedule of the tournament has been announced on 21 October 2026. India are the defending champions having won their second title in the previous edition.

== Qualification ==
The hosts Bangladesh and Nepal, along with the top nine full member teams from the 2025 tournament qualified directly for the tournament. The five remaining places were filled through regional qualifiers, with one team qualifying from each of the five ICC regions. The regional qualifiers were held from 8 March to 5 September 2026.

List of teams qualified for the 2027 Under-19 Women's T20 World Cup
Means of qualification	Berths	Qualified
Hosts	2	Bangladesh
Hosts	2	Nepal
2025 Under-19 Women's T20 World Cup (Top 9 full member teams from previous tournament)	9	Australia
2025 Under-19 Women's T20 World Cup (Top 9 full member teams from previous tournament)	9	England
2025 Under-19 Women's T20 World Cup (Top 9 full member teams from previous tournament)	9	India
2025 Under-19 Women's T20 World Cup (Top 9 full member teams from previous tournament)	9	Ireland
2025 Under-19 Women's T20 World Cup (Top 9 full member teams from previous tournament)	9	New Zealand
2025 Under-19 Women's T20 World Cup (Top 9 full member teams from previous tournament)	9	Pakistan
2025 Under-19 Women's T20 World Cup (Top 9 full member teams from previous tournament)	9	South Africa
2025 Under-19 Women's T20 World Cup (Top 9 full member teams from previous tournament)	9	Sri Lanka
2025 Under-19 Women's T20 World Cup (Top 9 full member teams from previous tournament)	9	West Indies
Regional qualification	5	Nigeria
Regional qualification	5	Samoa
Regional qualification	5	Scotland (Note: Scotland qualified automatically as they were the only team in the region that fulfilled the required criteria.)
Regional qualification	5	United Arab Emirates
Regional qualification	5	United States
Total	16	

== Squads ==
Each team will select a squad of fifteen players for the tournament, excluding reserves. England became the first team to announce their squad on 26 September 2026.

== Venues ==
Venues in Bangaldesh		Venues in Nepal	
A map of Bangladesh with pin-points on 2027 Under-19 Women's T20 World Cup venues		A map of Nepal with pin-points on 2027 Under-19 Women's T20 World Cup venues	
Chattogram	Sylhet	Kirtipur	Mulpani
Bir Shrestho Flight Lieutenant Matiur Rahman Cricket Stadium	Sylhet International Cricket Stadium	Tribhuvan University International Cricket Ground	Mulpani International Cricket Ground
Capacity: 22,000	Capacity: 18,500	Capacity: 13,000	Capacity: 4,000
Matches: 14 (Semi-finals and final)	Matches: 12	Matches: 6	Matches: 9
Bir Shrestho Flight Lieutenant Matiur Rahman Cricket Stadium	Sylhet International Cricket Stadium	Tribhuvan University International Cricket Ground	Mulpani International Cricket Ground

== Competition format ==
The 16 teams will divided into four groups of four, and will play once against each other side in their group. The top three teams in each group will progress to the Super Six League stage, where qualifying teams from Group A will play against two of the qualifying teams from Group D, and qualifying teams from Group B will play against two of the qualifying teams from Group C. Points from matches against teams that also qualified from the first group stage will carried forward into the Super Six League stage. The top two sides from each of the Super Six Leagues will progress to the semi-finals, with the final taking place on 6 February 2027.

== Group stage ==
=== Group A ===
Group A standings
Pos	Team	Pld	W	L	NR	Pts	NRR	Qualification
1	India	0	0	0	0	0	—	Advance to the Super 6
2	Ireland	0	0	0	0	0	—	Advance to the Super 6
3	Nepal (H)	0	0	0	0	0	—	Advance to the Super 6
4	West Indies	0	0	0	0	0	—	Advance to the play-offs

First match(es) will be played: 22 January 2027. Source:
(H) Host

Match 6
22 January 2027
09:30 UTC+5:45

Nepal	v	Ireland

Tribhuvan University International Cricket Stadium, Kirtipur

Match 8
22 January 2027
13:30 UTC+5:45 (D/N)

India	v	West Indies

Tribhuvan University International Cricket Stadium, Kirtipur

Match 14
24 January 2027
09:30 UTC+5:45

Nepal	v	India

Tribhuvan University International Cricket Stadium, Kirtipur

Match 16
24 January 2027
13:30 UTC+5:45 (D/N)

Ireland	v	West Indies

Tribhuvan University International Cricket Stadium, Kirtipur

Match 22
26 January 2027
09:30 UTC+5:45

Nepal	v	West Indies

Tribhuvan University International Cricket Stadium, Kirtipur

Match 24
26 January 2027
13:30 UTC+5:45 (D/N)

India	v	Ireland

Tribhuvan University International Cricket Stadium, Kirtipur

=== Group B ===
Group B standings
Pos	Team	Pld	W	L	NR	Pts	NRR	Qualification
1	New Zealand	0	0	0	0	0	—	Advance to the Super 6
2	Pakistan	0	0	0	0	0	—	Advance to the Super 6
3	Samoa	0	0	0	0	0	—	Advance to the Super 6
4	South Africa	0	0	0	0	0	—	Advance to the play-offs

First match(es) will be played: 22 January 2027. Source:

Match 5
22 January 2027
09:30 UTC+6

New Zealand	v	Samoa

Bir Shrestho Flight Lieutenant Matiur Rahman Cricket Stadium, Chattogram

Match 7
22 January 2027
13:30 UTC+6 (D/N)

Pakistan	v	South Africa

Bir Shrestho Flight Lieutenant Matiur Rahman Cricket Stadium, Chattogram

Match 13
24 January 2027
09:30 UTC+6

Samoa	v	South Africa

Bir Shrestho Flight Lieutenant Matiur Rahman Cricket Stadium, Chattogram

Match 15
24 January 2027
13:30 UTC+6 (D/N)

New Zealand	v	Pakistan

Bir Shrestho Flight Lieutenant Matiur Rahman Cricket Stadium, Chattogram

Match 21
26 January 2027
09:30 UTC+6

Pakistan	v	Samoa

Bir Shrestho Flight Lieutenant Matiur Rahman Cricket Stadium, Chattogram

Match 23
26 January 2027
13:30 UTC+6 (D/N)

New Zealand	v	South Africa

Bir Shrestho Flight Lieutenant Matiur Rahman Cricket Stadium, Chattogram

=== Group C ===
Group C standings
Pos	Team	Pld	W	L	NR	Pts	NRR	Qualification
1	Australia	0	0	0	0	0	—	Advance to the Super 6
2	Bangladesh (H)	0	0	0	0	0	—	Advance to the Super 6
3	Nigeria	0	0	0	0	0	—	Advance to the Super 6
4	United Arab Emirates	0	0	0	0	0	—	Advance to the play-offs

First match(es) will be played: 21 January 2027. Source:
(H) Host

Match 1
21 January 2027
09:30 UTC+6

Bangladesh	v	United Arab Emirates

Sylhet International Cricket Stadium, Sylhet

Match 3
21 January 2027
13:30 UTC+6 (D/N)

Australia	v	Nigeria

Sylhet International Cricket Stadium, Sylhet

Match 9
23 January 2027
09:30 UTC+6

Nigeria	v	United Arab Emirates

Sylhet International Cricket Stadium, Sylhet

Match 11
23 January 2027
13:30 UTC+6 (D/N)

Bangladesh	v	Australia

Sylhet International Cricket Stadium, Sylhet

Match 17
25 January 2027
09:30 UTC+6

Australia	v	United Arab Emirates

Sylhet International Cricket Stadium, Sylhet

Match 19
25 January 2027
13:30 UTC+6 (D/N)

Bangladesh	v	Nigeria

Sylhet International Cricket Stadium, Sylhet

=== Group D ===
Group D standings
Pos	Team	Pld	W	L	NR	Pts	NRR	Qualification
1	England	0	0	0	0	0	—	Advance to the Super 6
2	Scotland	0	0	0	0	0	—	Advance to the Super 6
3	Sri Lanka	0	0	0	0	0	—	Advance to the Super 6
4	United States	0	0	0	0	0	—	Advance to the play-offs

First match(es) will be played: 21 January 2027. Source:

Match 2
21 January 2027
09:30 UTC+5:45

Scotland	v	Sri Lanka

Mulpani International Cricket Ground, Mulpani

Match 4
21 January 2027
13:30 UTC+5:45 (D/N)

England	v	United States

Mulpani International Cricket Ground, Mulpani

Match 10
23 January 2027
09:30 UTC+5:45

Scotland	v	United States

Mulpani International Cricket Ground, Mulpani

Match 12
23 January 2027
13:30 UTC+5:45 (D/N)

England	v	Sri Lanka

Mulpani International Cricket Ground, Mulpani

Match 18
25 January 2027
09:30 UTC+5:45

England	v	Scotland

Mulpani International Cricket Ground, Mulpani

Match 20
25 January 2027
13:30 UTC+5:45 (D/N)

Sri Lanka	v	United States

Mulpani International Cricket Ground, Mulpani

== Super 6 ==
=== Group 1 ===
Group 1 standings
Pos	Team	Pld	W	L	NR	Pts	NRR	Qualification
1	A1	0	0	0	0	0	—	Advance to the knockout stage
2	A2	0	0	0	0	0	—	Advance to the knockout stage
3	A3	0	0	0	0	0	—	
4	D1	0	0	0	0	0	—	
5	D2	0	0	0	0	0	—	
6	D3	0	0	0	0	0	—	

First match(es) will be played: 28 January 2027. Source:

Match 28
28 January 2027
09:30 UTC+5:45

A3	v	D2

Mulpani International Cricket Ground, Mulpani

Match 29
28 January 2027
13:30 UTC+5:45 (D/N)

D1	v	A2

Mulpani International Cricket Ground, Mulpani

Match 33
31 January 2027
09:30 UTC+6

A2	v	D3

Bir Shrestho Flight Lieutenant Matiur Rahman Cricket Stadium, Chattogram

Match 34
31 January 2027
13:30 UTC+6 (D/N)

A1	v	D2

Bir Shrestho Flight Lieutenant Matiur Rahman Cricket Stadium, Chattogram

Match 35
1 February 2027
09:30 UTC+6

D1	v	A3

Bir Shrestho Flight Lieutenant Matiur Rahman Cricket Stadium, Chattogram

Match 38
2 February 2027
09:30 UTC+6

D3	v	A1

Bir Shrestho Flight Lieutenant Matiur Rahman Cricket Stadium, Chattogram

=== Group 2 ===
Group 2 standings
Pos	Team	Pld	W	L	NR	Pts	NRR	Qualification
1	B1	0	0	0	0	0	—	Advance to the knockout stage
2	B2	0	0	0	0	0	—	Advance to the knockout stage
3	B3	0	0	0	0	0	—	
4	C1	0	0	0	0	0	—	
5	C2	0	0	0	0	0	—	
6	C3	0	0	0	0	0	—	

First match(es) will be played: 29 January 2027. Source:

Match 30
29 January 2027
09:30 UTC+6

B3	v	C2

Sylhet International Cricket Stadium, Sylhet

Match 31
29 January 2027
13:30 UTC+6 (D/N)

C1	v	B2

Sylhet International Cricket Stadium, Sylhet

Match 32
30 January 2027
09:30 UTC+6

B1	v	C3

Sylhet International Cricket Stadium, Sylhet

Match 36
1 February 2027
09:30 UTC+6

C1	v	B3

Sylhet International Cricket Stadium, Sylhet

Match 37
1 February 2027
13:30 UTC+6 (D/N)

C3	v	B2

Sylhet International Cricket Stadium, Sylhet

Match 39
2 February 2027
13:30 UTC+6 (D/N)

B1	v	C2

Sylhet International Cricket Stadium, Sylhet

== 13th–16th place play-offs ==
Match 26
27 January 2027
09:30 UTC+5:45

A4	v	D4

Mulpani International Cricket Ground, Mulpani

Match 27
28 January 2027
09:30 UTC+6

B4	v	C4

Bir Shrestho Flight Lieutenant Matiur Rahman Cricket Stadium, Chattogram

== Knockout stage ==
=== Bracket ===
Semi-final
BC1	Group 2 winner
AD2	Group 1 runners-up
AD1	Group 1 winner
BC2	Group 2 runners-up

Final
SFW1	Winner of Semi final 1
SFW2	Winner of Semi final 2

=== Semi-finals ===
Semi-final 1
4 February 2027
09:30 UTC+6

Group 2 winner	v	Group 1 runners-up

Bir Shrestho Flight Lieutenant Matiur Rahman Cricket Stadium, Chattogram

Semi-final 2
4 February 2027
13:30 UTC+6 (D/N)

Group 1 winner	v	Group 2 runners-up

Bir Shrestho Flight Lieutenant Matiur Rahman Cricket Stadium, Chattogram

=== Final ===
Final
6 February 2027
13:30 UTC+6 (D/N)

Winner of Semi final 1	v	Winner of Semi final 2

Bir Shrestho Flight Lieutenant Matiur Rahman Cricket Stadium, Chattogram
