= United States women's national under-19 cricket team =

Under-19 cricket team

United States Women's Under-19 cricket team
- Association: USA Cricket

Personnel
- Captain: Anika Kolan
- Coach: Hilton Moreeng

History
- Twenty20 debut: v. Sri Lanka at Willowmoore Park, Benoni, South Africa; January 14, 2023
- U19 World Cup wins: 0

International Cricket Council
- ICC region: Americas

The United States women's under-19 cricket team represents the United States in international under-19 women's cricket. The team is administrated by USA Cricket (UC).

The United States qualified for the inaugural ICC Under-19 Women's T20 World Cup automatically as they were the only ICC Associate member in the Americas region that met the Event Pathway Participation Criteria for the tournament. The side finished bottom of their group at the inaugural tournament.

== History ==
The inaugural Women's Under-19 World Cup was scheduled to take place in January 2021, but was postponed multiple times due to the COVID-19 pandemic. It was eventually played from 14 to 29 January 2023, in South Africa. As they were the only ICC Associate member in the Americas region that met the Event Pathway Participation Criteria, the United States qualified automatically for the tournament.

The United States played their first series in August 2022, against the West Indies, winning the series 4–1. They announced their squad for the 2023 World Cup on December 14, 2022, with Shivnarine Chanderpaul announced as Head Coach of the side. The side finished bottom of the initial group stage at the tournament, and lost a subsequent play-off against Scotland.

For the second tournament, the USA again qualified automatically as they were the only one to fulfill the criteria and it's requirements. They finished in second in their group, with a win over Ireland and a washout between Pakistan, but they had done enough to qualify for the Super 6s as Pakistan lost their remaining two games. In the Super 6s, USA lost to New Zealand and their match against South Africa was washed out.

== Recent call-ups ==
The table below lists all the players who have been selected in recent squads for United States under-19s. This includes their squads for their series against the West Indies, and for the 2023 ICC Under-19 Women's T20 World Cup.

Name	Most Recent Call-up
Aditi Chudasama	2023 World Cup
Anika Kolan	2023 World Cup
Bhumika Bhadriraju	2023 World Cup
Chetnaa Prasad	West Indies series
Disha Dhingra	2023 World Cup
Geetika Kodali	2023 World Cup
Isani Vaghela	2023 World Cup
Jivana Aras	2023 World Cup
Laasya Mullapudi	2023 World Cup
Lisa Ramjit	West Indies series
Mitali Patwardhan	West Indies series
Pooja Ganesh	2023 World Cup
Pooja Shah	2023 World Cup
Ritu Singh	2023 World Cup
Sai Tanmayi Eyyunni	2023 World Cup
Snigdha Paul	2023 World Cup
Suhani Thadani	2023 World Cup
Taranum Chopra	2023 World Cup
Tya Gonsalves	West Indies series

== Records & statistics ==
International match summary

As of May 21, 2025

Playing records
Format	M	W	L	T	D/NR	Inaugural match
Youth Women's Twenty20 Internationals	7	1	5	0	1	January 14, 2023

Youth Women's Twenty20 record versus other nations

As of January 20, 2023

ICC Full members
Opponent	M	W	L	T	NR	First match	First win
Australia	1	0	1	0	0	January 16, 2023	
Bangladesh	1	0	1	0	0	January 18, 2023	
England	1	0	1	0	0	January 22, 2025	
(Republic of Ireland) Ireland	1	1	0	0	0	January 20, 2025	January 20, 2025
New Zealand	1	0	1	0	0	January 25, 2025	
Pakistan	1	0	0	0	1	January 18, 2025	
South Africa	1	0	0	0	1	January 28, 2025	
Sri Lanka	1	0	1	0	0	January 14, 2023	

Associate members
Opponent	M	W	L	T	NR	First match	First win
Scotland	1	0	1	0	0	January 20, 2023	

=== Leading runs scorers ===
As of January 20, 2023

S/N	Players	Runs	Average	Career span
1	Disha Dhingra	74	18.50	2023–Present
2	Laasya Mullapudi	61	15.25	2023–Present
3	Singdha Paul	54	18.00	2023–Present

=== Leading wickets takers ===
As of January 20, 2023

S/N	Player	Wickets	Average	Career span
1	Aditi Chudasama	4	15.00	2023–Present
2	Bhumika Bhadriraju	4	22.25	2023–Present
3	Snigdha Paul	3	17.66	2023–Present

=== Highest individual innings ===
As of January 20, 2023

S/N	Player	Score	Opposition	Match Date
1	Laasya Mullapudi	43	Scotland	January 20, 2023
2	Disha Dhingra	30	Scotland	January 20, 2023
3	Snigdha Paul	26	Bangladesh	January 18, 2023

=== Highest individual bowling figures ===
As of January 20, 2023

S/N	Player	Score	Opposition	Match Date
1	Aditi Chudasama	2/15	Bangladesh	January 18, 2023
2	Bhumika Bhadriraju	2/17	Sri Lanka	January 14, 2023
3	Aditi Chudasama	2/20	Scotland	January 20, 2023

=== Highest team totals ===
As of May 21, 2025

S/N	Dates	Totals	Against	Ref
1	January 22, 2025	119/5, (20 Overs)	England	

=== Lowest team totals ===
As of January 20, 2023

S/N	Dates	Totals	Against	Ref
1	January 14, 2023	96/9, (20 Overs)	Sri Lanka	
2	January 16, 2023	64/10, (15.3 Overs)	Australia	

== Under-19 World Cup record ==
United States U19 World Cup Record
Year	Result	Pos	№	Pld	W	L	T	NR
(South Africa) 2023	Fourth-Place Play-offs	–	16	4	0	4	0	0
Total				4	0	4	0	0
