= Shabnam Shakil =

Indian cricketer (born 2007)

Personal information
- Full name: Shabnam Mohammad Shakil
- Born: 17 June 2007 (age 19); Visakhapatnam, Andhra Pradesh, India
- Batting: Right-handed
- Bowling: Right-arm medium
- Role: Bowler

Domestic team information
- Years: Team
- 2022/23–present: Andhra
- 2024: Gujarat Giants
- 2024: South Zone

Career statistics
Competition	WFC	WLA	WT20
Matches	3	11	11
Runs scored	30	131	13
Batting average	10.00	21.83	4.33
100s/50s	0/0	0/1	0/0
Top score	16	50*	12*
Balls bowled	150	422	217
Wickets	2	8	8
Bowling average	51.50	37.37	27.37
5 wickets in innings	0	0	0
10 wickets in match	0	0	0
Best bowling	1/21	2/14	3/11
Catches/stumpings	0/–	4/–	1/–
Medal record
Women's cricket
Representing India
U19 World Cup
Winner	2023 South Africa
Winner	2025 Malaysia
U19 Asia Cup
Winner	2024 Malaysia
- Source: CricketArchive, 6 August 2025

Shabnam Shakil (born 17 June 2007) is an Indian cricketer who currently plays for Andhra and Gujarat Giants. She plays as a right-arm medium-fast bowler. She was part of the India team that won the inaugural Under-19 Women's T20 World Cup.

== Domestic career ==
In December 2023, she was signed by Gujarat Giants at the Women's Premier League auction, for the 2024 season. She became the youngest player to play in WPL at the age of 16. She took 3 wickets for 11 runs against UP Warriorz and the Giants won the game by 8 runs.

== International career ==
In November 2022, she was selected to the India women's under-19 team for a five-match T20 series against the New Zealand women's under-19 team. In December 2022, she was selected to the under-19 team for the 2023 Under-19 Women's T20 World Cup.

In June 2024, Shakil was added to India's ODI, T20I and Test squads for their series against South Africa.
