= Sonam Yadav =

Indian cricketer

Personal information
- Born: 18 July 2007 (age 19); Firozabad, Uttar Pradesh
- Batting: Right-handed
- Bowling: Slow left-arm orthodox
- Role: Bowler

Domestic team information
- Years: Team
- 2021/22–present: Uttar Pradesh
Medal record
Women's cricket
Representing India
U19 World Cup
Winner	2023 South Africa
Winner	2025 Malaysia
U19 Asia Cup
Winner	2024 Malaysia
- Source: ESPNcricinfo, 9 May 2024

Sonam Yadav is an Indian cricketer. She was part of the 2023 World Cup winning Indian Under-19 T20 team. She mainly plays for the Under-19 team as a bowler.

== Personal life ==
Sonam Yadav is an Indian cricketer who hails from Firozabad, Uttar Pradesh. Sonam Yadav's father's name is Mukesh Yadav. Sonam Yadav's mother's name is Guddi Devi. Sonam's house is near Raja's Tal of Thana Tundla area. Sonam's father Mukesh Kumar works in a glass factory from a middle-class family.

== Under-19 career ==
In November 2022, ahead of the under-19 T20 World Cup, she was named in India women's under-19 team for the five match T20 series against New Zealand women's under-19 team. In December 2022, she was selected to the Under-19 team for the 2023 Under-19 Women's T20 World Cup.

Sonam took one wicket against South Africa. Sonam was not included in the playing-11 against UAE. After this, he returned to the playing-11 against Scotland and took two wickets for just one run. Sonam took one wicket for 22 runs in three overs against Australia. Sonam did not get any wickets in the match against Sri Lanka, but she was quite economical. He gave only seven runs in three overs. Sonam did not get any wicket in the semi-final against New Zealand. In the final against England, Sonam took one wicket for just three runs.
