= Bangladesh women's national under-19 cricket team =

Under-19 cricket team

Bangladesh

Personnel
- Captain: Sumaiya Akter
- Coach: Dipu Roy Chowdhury
- Owner: Bangladesh Cricket Board

Team information
- Colors: Green and Red
- Founded: 2023
- Home ground: Sher-e-Bangla National Cricket Stadium, Dhaka
- Capacity: 25,400

History
- Twenty20 debut: v. Australia at Willowmoore Park, Benoni, South Africa; 14 January 2023
- Women's U19 T20 World Cup wins: 0
- Women's U19 T20 Asia Cup wins: 0

International Cricket Council
- ICC status: Full member (2000); Affiliate member (1997)
- ICC region: Asia
ODI kit
T20I kit
- As of 22 December 2024

The Bangladesh women's under-19 cricket team represents Bangladesh in international under-19 women's cricket. The team is administered by the Bangladesh Cricket Board (BCB).

The team played their first official matches at the 2023 ICC Under-19 Women's T20 World Cup, the first ever international women's under-19 T20 World Cup, in which they reached the Super Six stage.

== History ==
The inaugural Women's Under-19 World Cup was scheduled to take place in January 2021, but was postponed multiple times due to the COVID-19 pandemic. The tournament was eventually played in January 2023, in South Africa. As a Full Member of the ICC, Bangladesh qualified automatically for the tournament.

Bangladesh announced their 15-player squad for the tournament in December 2022. The side reached the Super Six stage, in which they finished third in their group.

== Squad ==
The table below lists all the players who have been selected for 2024 ACC Under-19 Women's T20 Asia Cup.

No	Player	Date of birth	Playing role
1	Juairiya Ferdous	25 October 2005 (age 21)	Right hand batter/Wicket-keeper
2	Mosammat Eva	4 April 2006 (age 20)	Right hand batter/Wicket-keeper
3	Sumaiya Akther Suborna	7 July 2007 (age 19)	Right hand batter
4	Afia Ashima Era	18 May 2006 (age 20)	Right hand batter/Right arm Offbreak
5	Jannatul Maoua	25 May 2006 (age 20)	Right hand Batter
6	Sadia Akter	8 August 2008 (age 18)	Right hand batter/Right arm Offbreak
7	Habiba Islam Pinky	1 June 2009 (age 17)	Right hand batter/Right arm Medium
8	Farjana Easmin	25 August 2009 (age 17)	Right hand batter/Right arm Medium fast
9	Nishita Akter Nishi	19 June 2008 (age 18)	Right hand batter/Right arm Offbreak
9	Anisa Akter Soba	7 January 2007 (age 19)	Right hand batter/Legbreak
10	Mst Unnoti Akter	18 April 2006 (age 20)	Wicket-keeper batter
11	Rabeya Khan	11 March 2005 (age 21)	All-rounder
12	Reya Akter Shika	1 April 2004 (age 22)	All-rounder
13	Shorna Akter	1 January 2007 (age 19)	All-rounder
14	Sumaiya Akter (Captain)	15 October 2005 (age 21)	All-rounder

== Coaching staff ==
Position	Name
Head coach	(Bangladesh) Dipu Roy Chowdhury

== Tournament history ==
A red box around the year indicates tournaments played within Bangladesh.

Key
Champions
Runners-up
Semi-finals

=== ICC Under-19 Women's World Cup ===
Bangladesh U-19 Women's Cricket Team World Cup records
Host/Year	Result	Pos	№	Pld	W	L	T	NR
(South Africa) 2023	Play-off round	5th	16	5	4	1	0	0
(Malaysia) (Thailand) 2025	Play-off round	7th	16	5	3	2	0	0
(Bangladesh) (Nepal) 2027	Qualified as hosts							
Total	0 Title			10	7	3	0	0

=== ACC Under-19 Women's Asia Cup ===
Bangladesh U-19 Women's Cricket Team Asia Cup records
Host/Year	Result	Pos	№	Pld	W	L	T	NR
(Malaysia) 2024	Runners-up	2nd	6	5	3	2	0	0
2026	To be determined							
Total	0 Title			5	3	2	0	0

== Honours ==
=== ACC ===
- Under-19 T20 Asia Cup:
  - Runners-up (1): 2024

== Records & statistics ==
International match summary

As of 20 December 2025

Playing records
Format	M	W	L	T	D/NR	Inaugural match
Youth Women's Twenty20 Internationals	32	21	11	0	0	14 January 2023

Youth Women's Twenty20 record versus other nations

As of 20 December 2025

Opponent	M	W	L	T	NR	First match	First win
ICC Full members
Australia	2	1	1	0	0	14 January 2023	14 January 2023
India	3	0	3	0	0	19 December 2024	
Pakistan	7	4	3	0	0	27 January 2024	27 January 2024
Sri Lanka	9	6	3	0	0	16 January 2023	16 January 2023
South Africa	1	0	1	0	0	21 January 2023	
Associate Members
China	3	3	0	0	0	17 December 2025	17 December 2025
Malaysia	1	1	0	0	0	17 December 2024	17 December 2024
Nepal	2	2	0	0	0	20 December 2024	20 December 2024
Scotland	1	1	0	0	0	22 January 2025	22 January 2025
United States	1	1	0	0	0	18 January 2023	18 January 2023
United Arab Emirates	1	1	0	0	0	25 January 2023	25 January 2023
(Cricket West Indies) West Indies	1	1	0	0	0	28 January 2025	28 January 2025

=== Leading runs scorers ===
As of 25 January 2023

S/N	Players	Runs	Average	Career span
1	Shorna Akter	153	51.00	2023–Present
2	Afia Humaira Anam Prottasha	120	24.00	2023–Present
3	Dilara Akter	110	36.66	2023–Present

=== Leading wickets takers ===
As of 25 January 2023

S/N	Player	Wickets	Average	Career span
1	Marufa Akter	8	12.12	2023–Present
2	Rabeya Khan	7	12.57	2023–Present
3	Disha Biswas	5	23.20	2023–Present

=== Highest individual innings ===
As of 25 January 2023

S/N	Player	Score	Opposition	Match Date
1	Afia Humaira Anam Prottasha	53	Sri Lanka	16 January 2023
2	Shorna Akter	50*	Sri Lanka	16 January 2023

=== Highest individual bowling figures ===
As of 25 January 2023

S/N	Player	Score	Opposition	Match Date
1	Rabeya Khan	3/14	United Arab Emirates	25 January 2023
2	Disha Biswas	2/13	Australia	14 January 2023
3	Marufa Akter	2/19	Sri Lanka	16 January 2023

=== Highest team totals ===
As of 25 January 2023

S/N	Dates	Totals	Against	Ref
1	16 January 2023	165/2, (20 Overs)	Sri Lanka	
2	14 January 2023	132/3, (18 Overs)	Australia	
3	21 January 2023	106/6, (20 Overs)	South Africa	

=== Lowest team totals ===
As of 25 January 2023

S/N	Dates	Totals	Against	Ref
1	18 January 2023	104/5, (17.3 Overs)	United States	
2	25 January 2023	73/5, (9.1 Overs)	United Arab Emirates	
