= Gongadi Trisha =

Indian cricketer (born 2005)

Personal information
- Full name: Gongadi V Trisha
- Born: 15 December 2005 (age 20); Bhadrachalam, Telangana, India
- Height: 5 ft 6 in (1.68 m)
- Batting: Right-handed
- Bowling: Right-arm leg break
- Role: All-rounder

Domestic team information
- Years: Team
- 2017/18–present: Hyderabad

Career statistics
Competition	FC	LA	T20
Matches	3	33	33
Runs scored	191	701	583
Batting average	47.75	23.36	23.32
100s/50s	0/1	0/3	0/3
Top score	93	95	72
Balls bowled	186	1,558	604
Wickets	5	25	24
Bowling average	17.20	29.60	20.66
5 wickets in innings	0	1	0
10 wickets in match	0	0	0
Best bowling	3/32	5/17	3/10
Catches/stumpings	0/–	7/–	4/–
Medal record
Women's cricket
Representing India
U19 World Cup
Winner	2023 South Africa
Winner	2025 Malaysia
U19 Asia Cup
Winner	2024 Malaysia
- Source: ESPNcricinfo, 7 August 2025

Gongadi Trisha (born 15 December 2005) is an Indian cricketer. An all-rounder, she bats right-handed and bowls right-arm leg breaks. She was a part of the India teams that won the inaugural and second edition of the Under-19 Women's T20 World Cup.

Trisha created history by scoring a century in the 2025 Women's U19 T20 World Cup and became the first centurion in the history of Women's U19 T20 World Cup.

== Early life ==
Trisha was born in Bhadrachalam, Telangana. Her father, who worked as a fitness trainer in a private company, recognized her talent and encouraged her to play cricket regularly, and left his job and moved to Secunderabad from Bhadrachalam to train his daughter in cricket. At seven years old, Trisha was admitted to the St John's Cricket Academy.

== Career ==
After playing for Hyderabad and South Zone age group teams, Trisha made her debut for Hyderabad in the 2017–18 Senior Women's T20 League. She represented India B in the 2021–22 U19 Women's Cricket Challengers, as well as the 2021–22 Senior Women's Challenger Trophy in Vijayawada, Andhra Pradesh.

In January 2023, Trisha played for India at the 2023 ICC Under-19 Women's T20 World Cup. In the final of the tournament, she top-scored with 24 as her side won by 7 wickets.
