= Eleanor Larosa =

Australian cricketer

Personal information
- Born: 26 November 2005 (age 20); Adelaide, South Australia, Australia
- Batting: Left-handed
- Bowling: Left-arm medium
- Role: All-rounder

Domestic team information
- Years: Team
- 2023/24–present: South Australia (squad no. 35)
- 2024/25–present: Adelaide Strikers (squad no. 35)

Career statistics
Competition	WLA	WT20
Matches	7	5
Runs scored	120	69
Batting average	60.00	23.00
100s/50s	0/2	0/0
Top score	55	31
Balls bowled	255	108
Wickets	9	9
Bowling average	22.11	14.11
5 wickets in innings	0	0
10 wickets in match	0	0
Best bowling	3/30	4/26
Catches/stumpings	2/–	2/–
- Source: CricketArchive, 20 October 2024

Eleanor Larosa (born 26 November 2005) is an Australian cricketer who currently plays for South Australia in the Women's National Cricket League (WNCL). An all-rounder, she plays as a left-arm medium bowler and a left-handed batter.

== Youth career ==
In December 2022, Larosa was named in the Australia Under-19 squad for the 2023 ICC Under-19 Women's T20 World Cup, but did not play a match at the tournament. In December 2024, she was selected as part of Australia's squad for the 2025 Under-19 Women's T20 World Cup.

== Domestic career ==
In May 2023, Larosa was named in the South Australia squad for the upcoming season. In January 2024, she made her debut for the side in a WNCL match against Victoria, taking 2/37 from her 8 overs. She was added to the Adelaide Strikers squad for WBBL|10.
