= Narayanan Janani =

Indian cricket umpire

Personal information
- Full name: Narayanan Janani
- Born: 28 April 1985 (age 41); Chennai, Tamil Nadu, India
- Role: Umpire

Umpiring information
- WTests umpired: 1 (2023)
- WODIs umpired: 9 (2021–2025)
- WT20Is umpired: 38 (2022–2025)
- FC umpired: 3 (2023–2024)
- Source: ESPNcricinfo, 24 December 2023

Narayanan Janani (born 28 April 1985) is an Indian cricket umpire. She is currently a member of Development Panel of ICC Umpires. She was one of the female umpires named by the ICC to stand in matches in the 2023 ICC Women's T20 World Cup.

On 10 January 2023, she along with Vrinda Rathi and Gayathri Venugopalan became the first woman umpires to stand as an on-field umpire in a men's domestic fixture in India, when she was one of the umpires in the match between Tripura and Railways in the 2022–23 Ranji Trophy.

In January 2025, she was named as part of a female officiating group for the 2025 Under-19 Women's T20 World Cup.
