= Gayathri Venugopalan =

Indian cricket umpire

Personal information
- Full name: Gayathri Venugopalan
- Born: 7 June 1979 (age 47); Chennai, Tamil Nadu, India
- Role: Umpire

Umpiring information
- WTests umpired: 1 (2024)
- WODIs umpired: 8 (2022–2025)
- WT20Is umpired: 26 (2022–2026)
- FC umpired: 3 (2023–2024)
- Source: ESPNcricinfo, 16 December 2024

Gayathri Venugopalan (born 7 June 1979) is an Indian cricket umpire. She was one of the female umpires named by the ICC to stand in matches in the 2025 Under-19 Women's T20 World Cup. She was one of the on-field umpire in 2025 Under-19 Women's T20 World Cup to officiate in semi-final along with Nitin Bathi.

On 10 January 2023, she along with Vrinda Rathi and Narayanan Janani became the first woman umpires to stand as an on-field umpire in a men's domestic fixture in India, when she was one of the umpires in the match between Jharkhand and Chhattisgarh in the 2022–23 Ranji Trophy.
