= Habiba Islam =

Bangladeshi cricketer (born 2009)

Personal information
- Full name: Habiba Islam Pinky
- Born: 1 June 2009 (age 17)
- Batting: Right-handed
- Bowling: Right-arm medium
- Role: Bowler

International information
- National side: Bangladesh
- Only T20I (cap 42): 6 May 2024 v India
Medal record
Women's Cricket
Representing Bangladesh
Under-19 Women’s T20 Asia Cup
Runner-up	2024 Malaysia
- Source: CricketArchive, 3 June 2024

Habiba Islam Pinky (born 1 June 2009) is a Bangladeshi cricketer who plays for the Bangladesh women's cricket team as a right-arm medium-fast bowler.

== International career ==
In April 2024, she earned her maiden call-up for the national team for the T20I series against India. She made her Twenty20 International (T20I) debut against India on 6 May 2024. She became the second youngest woman cricketer for Bangladesh, debuting at the age of 14.
