= Australia women's national under-19 cricket team =

Under-19 women's cricket team

Australia Women's Under-19 cricket team
- Association: Cricket Australia

Personnel
- Captain: Rhys McKenna
- Coach: Sarah Aley

History
- Twenty20 debut: v. Bangladesh at Willowmoore Park, Benoni, South Africa; 14 January 2023
- U19 World Cup wins: 0

International Cricket Council
- ICC region: East Asia-Pacific

The Australia women's under-19 cricket team represents Australia in international under-19 women's cricket. The team is administered by Cricket Australia.

The team played their first official matches at the 2023 Under-19 Women's T20 World Cup, the first ever international women's under-19 cricket competition, in which they reached the semi-finals.

== History ==
Since 2003, Australian Under-19 cricket teams have been formed to play matches against other national age-group and development teams. These matches carried no formal ICC designation.

The inaugural Women's Under-19 World Cup was scheduled to take place in January 2021, but was postponed multiple times due to the COVID-19 pandemic. The tournament eventually took place in January 2023, in South Africa. As a Full Member of the ICC, Australia qualified automatically for the tournament.

Australia announced their 15-player squad for the tournament on 13 December 2022. Former Australia international Sarah Aley was chosen as Head Coach of the side for the tournament, assisted by Erin Osborne and Dulip Samaraweera. They reached the semi-finals of the tournament, but were beaten by England by 3 runs.

== Recent call-ups ==
The table below lists all the players who have been selected in recent squads for Australia under-19s. Currently, this only includes the squad for the 2023 Under-19 Women's T20 World Cup.

Name	Birth date	Role	Batting style	Bowling style	Team	Most Recent Call-up
Chloe Ainsworth	14 September 2005 (age 21)	Bowler	Right-handed	Right-arm medium	Western Australia	2023 World Cup
Jade Allen	13 November 2003 (age 22)	Bowler	Right-handed	Right-arm leg break	New South Wales	2023 World Cup
Charis Bekker	14 March 2004 (age 22)	All-rounder	Right-handed	Slow left-arm orthodox	Western Australia	2023 World Cup
Paris Bowdler	24 November 2004 (age 21)	Wicket-keeper	Right-handed	–	Victoria	2023 World Cup
Maggie Clark	15 March 2007 (age 19)	Bowler	Left-handed	Right-arm medium	South Australia	2023 World Cup
Sianna Ginger	26 July 2005 (age 21)	Batter	Right-handed	Right-arm medium	Central Sparks	2023 World Cup
Paris Hall	10 November 2003 (age 23)	Wicket-keeper	Left-handed	–	South Australia	2023 World Cup
Lucy Hamilton	8 May 2006 (age 20)	Bowler	Left-handed	Left-arm medium	Queensland	2023 World Cup
Ella Hayward	8 September 2003 (age 23)	Bowler	Right-handed	Right-arm off break	Victoria	2023 World Cup
Milly Illingworth	15 July 2005 (age 21)	Bowler	Right-handed	Right-arm medium	Victoria	2023 World Cup
Eleanor Larosa	26 November 2005 (age 20)	All-rounder	Left-handed	Left-arm medium	South Australia	2023 World Cup
Rhys McKenna	17 August 2004 (age 22)	Bowler	Right-handed	Right-arm medium	Victoria	2023 World Cup
Claire Moore	30 October 2003 (age 23)	Batter	Right-handed	Right-arm medium	New South Wales	2023 World Cup
Kate Pelle	17 January 2006 (age 20)	Wicket-keeper	Right-handed	Right-arm medium	New South Wales	2023 World Cup
Ananaya Sharma	14 December 2003 (age 22)	Bowler	Right-handed	Right-arm off break	New South Wales	2023 World Cup
Amy Smith	16 November 2004 (age 21)	Bowler	Right-handed	Right-arm leg break	Tasmania	2023 World Cup
Ella Wilson	17 November 2003 (age 22)	All-rounder	Right-handed	Right-arm medium	South Australia	2023 World Cup

== Records & statistics ==
International match summary

As of 27 January 2023

Playing records
Format	M	W	L	T	D/NR	Inaugural match
Youth Women's Twenty20 Internationals	6	4	2	0	0	14 January 2023

Youth Women's Twenty20 record versus other nations

As of 27 January 2023

ICC Full members
Opponent	M	W	L	T	NR	First match	First win
Bangladesh	1	0	1	0	0	14 January 2023	
India	1	1	0	0	0	21 January 2023	21 January 2023
England	1	0	1	0	0	27 January 2023	
Sri Lanka	1	1	0	0	0	18 January 2023	18 January 2023

Associate members
Opponent	M	W	L	T	NR	First match	First win
United Arab Emirates	1	1	0	0	0	23 January 2023	23 January 2023
United States	1	1	0	0	0	16 January 2023	16 January 2023

=== Leading runs scorers ===
As of 27 January 2023

S/N	Players	Runs	Average	Career span
1	Claire Moore	141	35.25	2023–Present
2	Kate Pelle	134	26.80	2023–Present
3	Ella Hayward	108	27.00	2023–Present

=== Leading wickets takers ===
As of 27 January 2023

S/N	Player	Wickets	Average	Career span
1	Maggie Clark	12	6.25	2023–Present
2	Sianna Ginger	7	5.57	2023–Present
3	Ella Hayward	5	13.28	2023–Present

=== Highest individual innings ===
As of 27 January 2023

S/N	Player	Score	Opposition	Match Date
1	Claire Moore	52	Bangladesh	14 January 2023
2	Kate Pelle	51	United Arab Emirates	23 January 2023
3	Ella Hayward	36	Sri Lanka	18 January 2023

=== Best individual bowling figures ===
As of 27 January 2023

S/N	Player	Score	Opposition	Match Date
1	Sianna Ginger	3/13	India	21 January 2023
2	Maggie Clark	3/15	England	27 January 2023
3	Ella Hayward	3/25	England	27 January 2023

=== Highest team totals ===
As of 27 January 2023

S/N	Dates	Totals	Against	Ref
1	18 January 2023	159/5, (20 Overs)	Sri Lanka	

=== Lowest team totals ===
As of 27 January 2023

S/N	Dates	Totals	Against	Ref
1	17 January 2023	96/5, (18.5 Overs)	England	

== Under-19 World Cup record ==
Australia U19's Twenty20 World Cup Record
Year	Result	Pos	№	Pld	W	L	T	NR
(South Africa) 2023	Semi-finals	4th	16	6	4	2	0	0
(Malaysia) 2025	Semi-finals	3rd	16	6	4	2	0	0
(Bangladesh) (Nepal) 2027	To be determined							
Total				12	8	4	0	0
