= Caoimhe Bray =

Australian cricketer (born 2009)

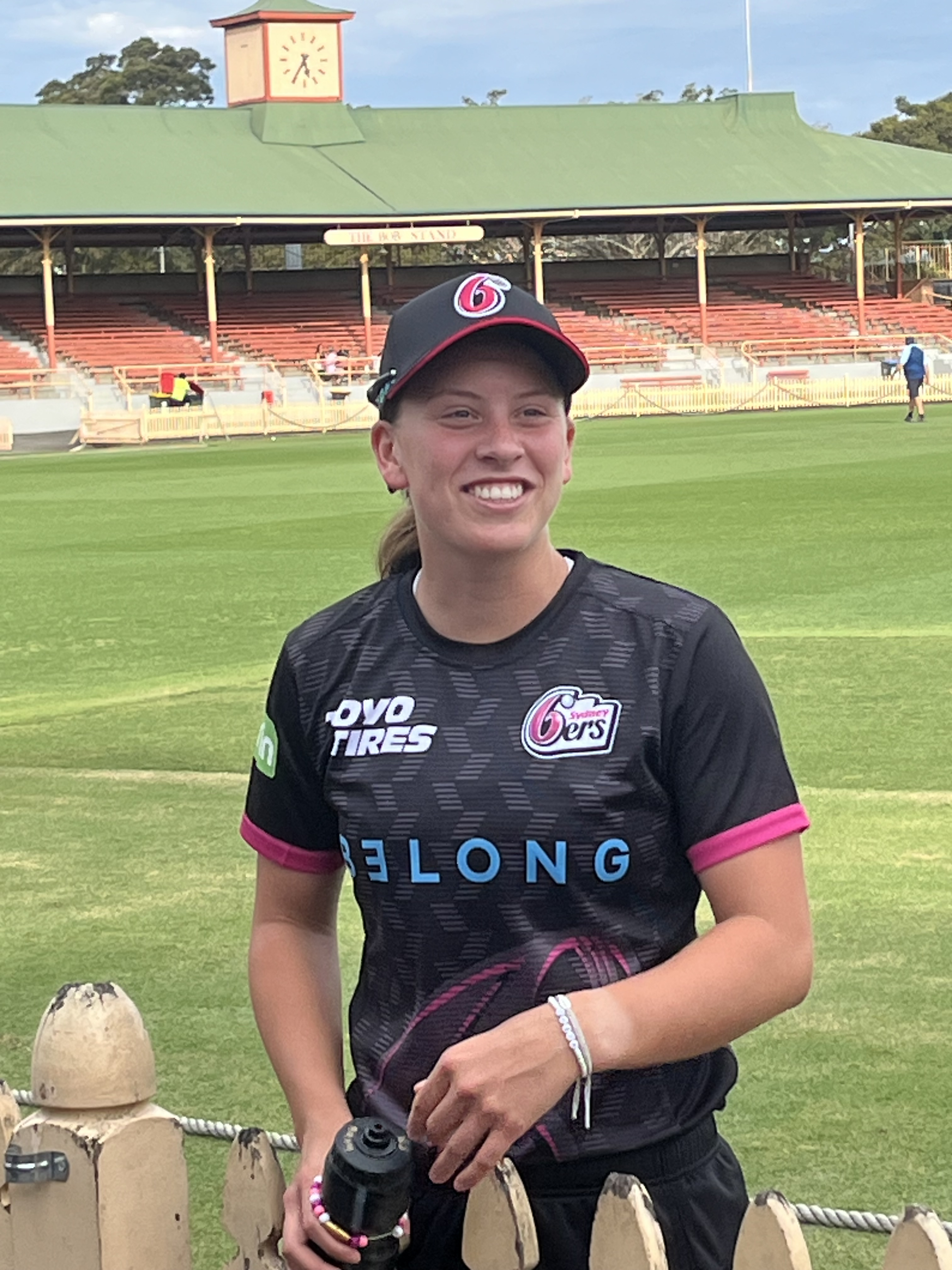
- Bray in 2025

Personal information
- Born: 23 September 2009 (age 17)
- Batting: Right-handed
- Bowling: Right-arm fast-medium
- Role: All-rounder

Domestic team information
- Years: Team
- 2024/25–present: Sydney Sixers (squad no. 18)

Career statistics
| Competition | WT20 |
|---|---|
| Matches | 10 |
| Runs scored | 47 |
| Batting average | 9.40 |
| 100s/50s | 0/0 |
| Top score | 19* |
| Balls bowled | 170 |
| Wickets | 10 |
| Bowling average | 19.20 |
| 5 wickets in innings | 0 |
| 10 wickets in match | 0 |
| Best bowling | 2/13 |
| Catches/stumpings | 2/– |
- Source: CricketArchive, 14 November 2024

Caoimhe Bray (/ˈkiːvə ˈbreɪ/ KEE-və BRAY; born 23 September 2009) is an Australian cricketer who plays for the Sydney Sixers in the Women's Big Bash League. An all-rounder, she plays as a right-handed batter and right-arm fast-medium bowler and has drawn comparison to Sixers teammate Ellyse Perry. Besides cricket, Bray also plays soccer for the Junior Matildas as a goalkeeper.

== Career ==
Bray made her Twenty20 debut on 11 October 2024 for the Sydney Sixers against the ACT Meteors during the 2024 T20 Spring Challenge. She made her Women's Big Bash League on 27 October during the 2024–25 Women's Big Bash League season, becoming the youngest player to feature in a WBBL match.
