= Shathira Jakir =

Bangladeshi cricketer

Personal information
- Full name: Shathira Jakir Jessy
- Born: 30 November 1990 (age 35); Lalmonirhat, Bangladesh
- Batting: Right-handed
- Bowling: Right-arm off break
- Role: Bowler

International information
- National side: Bangladesh (2011–2013)
- ODI debut (cap 9): 26 November 2011 v Ireland
- Last ODI: 24 September 2013 v South Africa
- Only T20I (cap 22): 15 September 2013 v South Africa

Domestic team information
- Years: Team
- 2012/13–2017/18: Rangpur Division

Umpiring information
- WODIs umpired: 9 (2024–2025)
- WT20Is umpired: 21 (2024–2026)
- LA umpired: 1 (2024)

Career statistics
Competition	WODI	WT20I	WLA	WT20
Matches	2	1	9	13
Runs scored	1	–	133	57
Batting average	0.50	–	19.00	7.12
100s/50s	0/0	–	0/1	0/0
Top score	1	–	62	22*
Balls bowled	22	–	342	270
Wickets	0	–	15	17
Bowling average	–	–	11.46	12.52
5 wickets in innings	0	–	0	0
10 wickets in match	0	–	0	0
Best bowling	–	–	4/22	3/7
Catches/stumpings	0/–	0/–	5/–	2/–
Medal record
Representing Bangladesh
Women's Cricket
Asian Games
Silver medal – second place	2010 Guangzhou	Team
- Source: ESPNCricinfo, 16 June 2023

Shathira Jakir Jessy (Bengali: সাথিরা জাকির জেসী) (born 30 November 1990) is a Bangladeshi former cricketer who played as a right-arm off break bowler. She appeared in two One Day Internationals and one Twenty20 International for Bangladesh from 2011 to 2013. She played domestic cricket for Rangpur Division.

She is Bangladesh's first international woman umpire.

== Career ==
=== ODI career ===
Jakir made her ODI debut against Ireland on 26 November 2011.

=== T20I career ===
Jakir made her T20I debut against South Africa on 15 September 2013.

=== Asian games ===
Jakir was a member of the team that won a silver medal in the women's cricket tournament at the 2010 Asian Games in Guangzhou, China.

=== Umpiring career ===
She was the first woman umpire from Bangladesh to be empanelled in the International Panel of ICC Umpires. She has officiated matches in 2025 Under-19 Women's T20 World Cup qualifiers. In August 2025, she became the first Bangladeshi woman umpire to be appointed as a match official in Men's cricket, being appointed Fourth umpire for the first and the third T20I and Third umpire for the second T20I to be played between Bangladesh and Netherlands in August–September, 2025.

In September 2025, she was named one of the fourteen all-women match officials for the 2025 Women's Cricket World Cup.
