= West Indies women's under-19 cricket team =

Under-19 cricket team

West Indies Women's Under-19 cricket team
- Association: Cricket West Indies

Personnel
- Captain: Ashmini Munisar

History
- Twenty20 debut: v. Ireland at Absa Puk Oval, Potchefstroom, South Africa; 16 January 2023
- U19 World Cup wins: 0

International Cricket Council
- ICC region: Americas

The West Indies women's under-19 cricket team represents the countries of Cricket West Indies in international under-19 women's cricket.

The team played their first matches against the United States in August 2022 to prepare for the first ever international women's under-19 cricket competition, the 2023 Under-19 Women's T20 World Cup. The side reached the Super Six stage of the inaugural tournament.

== History ==
The inaugural Women's Under-19 World Cup was scheduled to take place in January 2021, but was postponed multiple times due to the COVID-19 pandemic. The tournament eventually took place in January 2023 in South Africa. As a Full Member of the ICC, West Indies qualified automatically for the tournament.

The West Indies played their first series in August 2022, against the United States, losing the series 1–4. They announced their squad for the 2023 World Cup on 8 December 2022. The side reached the Super Six stage, in which they finished fifth in their group.

== Recent call-ups ==
The table below lists all the players who have been selected in recent squads for West Indies under-19s. This includes their squads for their series against the United States, and for the 2023 Under-19 Women's T20 World Cup.

Name	Most Recent Call-up
Asabi Callendar	2023 World Cup
Jahzara Claxton	2023 World Cup
Naijanni Cumberbatch	2023 World Cup
Earnisha Fontaine	2023 World Cup
Jannillea Glasgow	2023 World Cup
Realanna Grimmond	2023 World Cup
Trishan Holder	2023 World Cup
Zaida James	2023 World Cup
Djenaba Joseph	2023 World Cup
KD Jazz Mitchell	2023 World Cup
Ashmini Munisar	2023 World Cup
Ashley Ramnath	USA series
Samara Ramnath	USA series
Shalini Samaroo	2023 World Cup
Shunelle Sawh	2023 World Cup
Lena Scott	2023 World Cup
Abini St Jean	2023 World Cup
Kate Wilmot	USA series

== Tournament history ==
A red box around the year indicates tournaments played within West Indies

Key
Champions
Runners-up
Semi-finals

=== Under-19 World Cup ===
West Indies's U19 Twenty20 World Cup Record
Year	Result	Pos	№	Pld	W	L	T	NR
(South Africa) 2023	Super 6	–	16	5	2	3	0	0
(Malaysia) 2025	To be determined							
(Bangladesh) (Nepal) 2027	To be determined							
Total				5	3	2	0	0

== Records & statistics ==
International match summary

As of 25 January 2023

Playing records
Format	M	W	L	T	D/NR	Inaugural match
Youth Women's Twenty20 Internationals	5	2	3	0	0	15 January 2023

Youth Women's Twenty20 record versus other nations

As of 25 January 2023

ICC Full members
Opponent	M	W	L	T	NR	First match	First win
England	1	0	1	0	0	25 January 2023	
Ireland	1	1	0	0	0	15 January 2023	15 January 2023
New Zealand	1	0	1	0	0	19 January 2023	

Associate members
Opponent	M	W	L	T	NR	First match	First win
Indonesia	1	1	0	0	0	17 January 2023	17 January 2023
Rwanda	1	0	1	0	0	22 January 2023	
