= Ireland women's under-19 cricket team =

Under-19 cricket team

Ireland Women's Under-19 cricket team
- Association: Cricket Ireland

Personnel
- Captain: Amy Hunter
- Coach: Glenn Querl

History
- Twenty20 debut: v. West Indies at Absa Puk Oval, Potchefstroom, South Africa; 16 January 2023
- U19 World Cup wins: 0

International Cricket Council
- ICC region: Europe

The Ireland women's under-19 cricket team represents Ireland in international under-19 women's cricket. The team is administrated by Cricket Ireland.

The team played their first official matches at the 2023 Under-19 Women's T20 World Cup, the first ever international women's under-19 cricket competition, in which they reached the Super Six round.

== History ==
The inaugural Women's Under-19 World Cup was scheduled to take place in January 2021, but was postponed multiple times due to the COVID-19 pandemic. The tournament eventually took place in January 2023, in South Africa. As a Full Member of the ICC, Ireland qualified automatically for the tournament.

Ireland announced their 15-player squad for the tournament on 1 December 2022. Glenn Querl, Head Coach of Scorchers, was chosen as Head Coach of the side for the tournament. At the tournament, Ireland qualified for the Super Six from the initial group stage, beating Indonesia, but lost all their matches in their Super Six group.

== Squad ==
For their tour to South Africa for a five-match T20 series in October 2024, a 14-player squad was named, to be captained by Amy Hunter.

Name	Age	Batting style	Bowling style	Notes
Batters
Abbi Harrison	18	Right-handed	Right-arm off break	
Annabel Squires	18	Right-handed	Right-arm leg-spin	
Millie Spence		Right-handed	Right-arm medium	
Lucy Neely		Right-handed	Right-arm medium	
All-rounders
Julie McNally	17	Right-handed	Right-arm medium	
Alice Walsh	18	Right-handed	Right-arm medium	
Wicket-keepers
**Amy Hunter**	19	Right-handed	–	Captain
Spin Bowlers
**Freya Sargent**	18	Right-handed	Right-arm off break	Vice-Captain
**Aimee Maguire**	18	Right-handed	Slow left-arm orthodox	
Kia McCartney	19	Right-handed	Right-arm off break	
Seam Bowlers
**Alice Tector**	16	Right-handed	Right-arm medium	
Niamh MacNulty	17	Right-handed	Right-arm medium	Vice-Captain
Ellie McGee	18	Right-handed	Right-arm medium	
Lara McBride		Right-handed	Right-arm medium	

Players with senior international caps are listed in bold.

== Records & statistics ==
International match summary

As of 23 January 2023

Playing records
Format	M	W	L	T	D/NR	Inaugural match
Youth Women's Twenty20 Internationals	5	1	4	0	0	15 January 2023

Youth Women's Twenty20 record versus other nations

As of 23 January 2023

ICC Full members
Opponent	M	W	L	T	NR	First match	First win
England	1	0	1	0	0	21 January 2023	
Pakistan	1	0	1	0	0	23 January 2023	
New Zealand	1	0	1	0	0	17 January 2023	
(Cricket West Indies) West Indies	1	0	1	0	0	15 January 2023	

Associate members
Opponent	M	W	L	T	NR	First match	First win
Indonesia	1	1	0	0	0	19 January 2023	19 January 2023

== Under-19 World Cup record ==
Ireland's U-19 Twenty20 World Cup Record
Year	Result	Pos	№	Pld	W	L	T	NR
(South Africa) 2023	Super 6	–	16	5	1	4	0	0
(Malaysia) (Thailand) 2025	To be determined							
(Bangladesh) (Nepal) 2027	To be determined							
Total				5	1	4	0	0
