= Pakistan women's national under-19 cricket team =

Under-19 cricket team

Pakistan Women's Under-19 cricket team
- Association: Pakistan Cricket Board

Personnel
- Captain: Syeda Aroob Shah
- Coach: Mohsin Kamal

Team information
- Colors: Green and white
- Founded: 2023

History
- Twenty20 debut: v. Rwanda at Senwes Park, Potchefstroom, South Africa; 14 January 2023
- U19 World Cup wins: 0

International Cricket Council
- ICC region: Asia

The Pakistan women's under-19 cricket team represents Pakistan in international under-19 women's cricket. The team is administered by the Pakistan Cricket Board (PCB).

The team played their first official matches at the 2023 Under-19 Women's T20 World Cup, the first ever international women's under-19 cricket competition, where they reached the Super Six stage. Zoofishan Ayyaz has been appointed captain, while Komal Khan has been named as the vice-captain.

== History ==
The inaugural Women's Under-19 World Cup was originally scheduled for January 2021, but was postponed multiple times due to the COVID-19 pandemic. The tournament was eventually held in 2023, in South Africa. As a Full Member of the ICC, Pakistan qualified automatically for the tournament.

Pakistan announced their 15-player squad for the tournament on 7 December 2022. Mohsin Kamal was announced as Head Coach of the side. The side reached the Super Six stage at the tournament, winning three matches.

== Recent call-ups ==
The table below lists all the players who have been selected in recent squads for Pakistan under-19s.

Name	Most Recent Call-up
Aliza Khan	2023 World Cup
Anosha Nasir	2023 World Cup
Areesha Noor	2023 World Cup
Eyman Fatima	2023 World Cup
Haleema Azeem Dar	2023 World Cup
Haniah Ahmer	2023 World Cup
Laiba Nasir	2023 World Cup
Mahnoor Aftab	2023 World Cup
Quratulain Ahsen	2023 World Cup
Rida Aslam	2023 World Cup
Shawaal Zulfiqar	2023 World Cup
Syeda Aroob Shah	2023 World Cup
Warda Yousaf	2023 World Cup
Zaib-un-Nisa	2023 World Cup
Zamina Tahir	2023 World Cup
Areesha Ansari	2025
Aqsa Habib	2025
Ayesha Riaz	2025
Shahar Bano	2025
Eman Naseer	Pakistan tour of Bangladesh 2025
Habiba Khan	Pakistan tour of Bangladesh 2025

== Records & statistics ==
International match summary

As of 18 December 2024

Playing records
Format	M	W	L	T	D/NR	Inaugural match
Youth Women's Twenty20 Internationals	8	3	4	0	1	15 January 2023

Youth Women's Twenty20 record versus other nations

As of 18 December 2024

ICC Full members
Opponent	M	W	L	T	NR	First match	First win
England	1	0	1	0	0	15 December 2024	
India	1	0	1	0	0	15 December 2024	
Ireland	1	0	1	0	1	23 January 2023	
Nepal	1	0	1	0	0	16 December 2024	
New Zealand	1	0	1	0	0	24 January 2023	
Zimbabwe	1	1	0	0	0	19 January 2023	19 January 2023

Associate members
Opponent	M	W	L	T	NR	First match	First win
Malaysia	1	0	0	0	1	18 December 2024	
Rwanda	1	1	0	0	0	15 January 2023	15 January 2023

=== Leading runs scorers ===
As of 24 January 2023

S/N	Players	Runs	Average	Career Span	Domestic
1	Eyman Fatima	157	52.33	2023–Present	PCB
2	Syeda Aroob Shah	98	32.66	2023–Present	PCB
3	Shawaal Zulfiqar	76	19.00	2023–Present	-

=== Leading wickets takers ===
As of 30 December 2025

S/N	Player	Wickets	Average	Career span	Domestic
1	Anosha Nasir	10	11.00	2023–Present	PCB
2	Areesha Noor Bhatti	6	17.66	2023–Present	PCB
3	Habiba Khan	5	9.00	2025	Warwickshire Women
4	Rida Aslam	4	30.75	2023–Present	PCB

=== Highest individual innings ===
As of 24 January 2023

S/N	Player	Score	Opposition	Match Date
1	Eyman Fatima	65*	Rwanda	15 January 2023
2	Syeda Aroob Shah	35	Ireland	23 January 2023
3	Shawaal Zulfiqar	32*	Zimbabwe	19 January 2023

=== Highest individual bowling figures ===
As of 24 January 2026

S/N	Player	Score	Opposition	Match Date
1	Habiba Khan	3/11	Bangladesh	10 December 2025
2	Anosha Nasir	3/32	New Zealand	24 January 2023
3	Areesha Noor Bhatti	2/19	Rwanda	15 January 2023
4	Zaib un-Nisa	2/24	England	17 January 2023

=== Lowest team totals ===
As of 24 January 2023

S/N	Dates	Totals	Against	Ref
1	24 January 2023	75/7, (20 Overs)	New Zealand	
2	17 January 2023	103/5, (20 Overs)	England	

== Under-19 World Cup record ==
Pakistan's U19 Twenty20 World Cup Record
Year	Result	Pos	№	Pld	W	L	T	NR
(South Africa) 2023	Super 6	–	16	5	3	2	0	0
(Malaysia) (Thailand) 2025	To be determined							
(Bangladesh) (Nepal) 2027	To be determined							
Total				5	3	2	0	0

== Under-19 Women's Asia Cup record ==
Pakistan's Under-19 Twenty20 Asia Cup Record
Year	Result	Pos	№	Pld	W	L	T	NR
(Malaysia) 2024	Group stage	5/6	6	3	0	2	0	1
Total				3	0	2	0	1

== See also ==
- Pakistan national under-19 cricket team
- Pakistan men's national cricket team
- Pakistan women's national cricket team
