= New Zealand women's national under-19 cricket team =

Under-19 cricket team

New Zealand Women's Under-19 cricket team
- Association: New Zealand Cricket

Personnel
- Captain: Izzy Sharp
- Coach: Sara McGlashan

History
- Twenty20 debut: v. India at Mumbai, India; 27 November 2022
- U19 World Cup wins: 0

International Cricket Council
- ICC region: East Asia-Pacific

The New Zealand women's under-19 cricket team represents New Zealand in international under-19 women's cricket. The team is administrated by New Zealand Cricket (NZC).

The team played their first official matches against India in late 2022, in preparation for the 2023 Under-19 Women's T20 World Cup, the first ever international women's under-19 cricket competition, where New Zealand reached the semi-finals.

== History ==
The inaugural Women's Under-19 World Cup was scheduled to take place in January 2021, but was postponed multiple times due to the COVID-19 pandemic. It eventually took place in January 2023, in South Africa. As a Full Member of the ICC, New Zealand qualified automatically for the tournament.

In November and December 2022, in preparation for the World Cup, New Zealand played a five-match T20I series against India, losing the series 5–0. Subsequently, New Zealand announced their 15-player squad for the World Cup, on 13 December 2022, with former international Sara McGlashan named as Head Coach. The side went unbeaten through the first two group stages of the tournament to qualify for the semi-finals, but lost by 8 wickets to India in the semi-final.

== Recent call-ups ==
The table below lists all the players who have been selected in recent squads for New Zealand under-19s. Currently, this only includes the squad for the 2023 Under-19 Women's T20 World Cup.

Name	Most Recent Call-up
Olivia Anderson	2023 World Cup
Anna Browning	2023 World Cup
Kate Chandler	2023 World Cup
Natasha Codyre	2023 World Cup
Izzy Gaze	2023 World Cup
Antonia Hamilton	2023 World Cup
Abigail Hotton	2023 World Cup
Breearne Illing	2023 World Cup (withdrawn)
Emma Irwin	2023 World Cup
Kate Irwin	2023 World Cup
Fran Jonas	2023 World Cup
Kayley Knight	2023 World Cup
Louisa Kotkamp	2023 World Cup
Paige Loggenberg	2023 World Cup
Emma McLeod	2023 World Cup
Georgia Plimmer	2023 World Cup
Izzy Sharp	2023 World Cup
Tash Wakelin	2023 World Cup

== Tournament history ==
A red box around the year indicates tournaments played within New Zealand

Key
Champions
Runners-up
Semi-finals

=== Under-19 Women's World Cup ===
New Zealand Women's U19's Twenty20 World Cup Record
Year	Result	Pos	№	Pld	W	L	T	NR
(South Africa) 2023	Semi-finals	–	16	6	5	1	0	0
(Malaysia) (Thailand) 2025	To be determined							
(Bangladesh) (Nepal) 2027	To be determined							
Total				6	5	1	0	0

== Records and statistics ==
International match summary

As of 27 January 2023

Playing record
Format	M	W	L	T	D/NR	Inaugural match
Youth Women's Twenty20 Internationals	10	4	6	0	0	27 November 2022

Youth Women's Twenty20 record versus other nations

As of 27 January 2023

ICC Full members
Opponent	M	W	L	T	NR	First match	First win
India	6	0	6	0	0	27 November 2022	–
Ireland	1	1	0	0	0	17 January 2023	17 January 2023
West Indies	1	1	0	0	0	19 January 2023	19 January 2023

Associate members
Opponent	M	W	L	T	NR	First match	First win
Indonesia	1	1	0	0	0	15 January 2023	15 January 2023
Rwanda	1	1	0	0	0	21 January 2023	21 January 2023

=== Leading run scorers ===
As of 27 January 2023

No.	Players	Runs	Average	Career span
1	Georgia Plimmer	155	51.66	2022–Present
2	Anna Browning	127	42.33	2022–Present
3	Emma McLeod	93	31.00	2022–Present

=== Leading wicket takers ===
As of 27 January 2023

No.	Player	Wickets	Average	Career span
1	Tash Wakelin	6	7.83	2022–Present
2	Anna Browning	6	9.16	2022–Present
3	Kate Chandler	5	5.80	2022–Present

=== Highest individual innings ===
As of 27 January 2023

No	Player	Score	Opposition	Match Date
1	Emma McLeod	59	South Africa	21 January 2023
2	Georgia Plimmer	53	Pakistan	24 January 2023
3	Georgia Plimmer	41*	West Indies	19 January 2023

=== Best individual bowling figures ===
As of 27 January 2023

S/N	Player	Score	Opposition	Match Date
1	Kayley Knight	4/24	India	1 December 2022
2	Natasha Codyre	3/6	Ireland	17 January 2023
3	Kate Chandler	3/8	West Indies	19 January 2023
