= Sri Lanka women's national under-19 cricket team =

Under-19 cricket team

Sri Lanka Women's Under-19 cricket team
- Association: Sri Lanka Cricket

Personnel
- Captain: Chamudi Praboda
- Coach: Ruvin Peiris

Team information
- Colors: Blue & Yellow

History
- Twenty20 debut: v United States at Willowmoore Park, Benoni, South Africa; 14 January 2023
- U19 World Cup wins: 0

International Cricket Council
- ICC region: Asia

The Sri Lanka women's under-19 cricket team represents Sri Lanka in international under-19 women's cricket. The team is administrated by Sri Lanka Cricket (SLC).

The team played their first official matches at the 2023 Under-19 Women's T20 World Cup, the first-ever international women's under-19 cricket competition, in which they reached the Super Six stage.

== History ==
The inaugural Women's Under-19 World Cup was scheduled to take place in January 2021, but was postponed multiple times due to the COVID-19 pandemic. The tournament eventually took place in January 2023, in South Africa. As a Full Member of the ICC, Sri Lanka qualified automatically for the tournament.

Sri Lanka named their 15-player squad for the tournament on 5 December 2022. The side reached the Super Six stage, in which they finished fifth in their group.

The Sri Lanka women's national under-19 cricket team participated in the 2025 ICC Under-19 Women's T20 World Cup held in Malaysia. The team progressed through the initial stages to qualify for the 'Super Six' round. Competing in Group 1 of the Super Six stage, Sri Lanka secured the third position in their group and ultimately concluded the tournament in fifth place overall.

== Tournament History ==
A red box around the year indicates tournaments played within Sri Lanka

Key
Champions
Runners-up
Semi-finals

=== Under-19 Women's World Cup ===
Sri Lanka's U19 Twenty20 World Cup Record
Year	Result	Pos	№	Pld	W	L	T	NR
(South Africa) 2023	Super 6	–	16	5	1	4	0	0
(Malaysia) (Thailand) 2025	Super 6	5	16	7	4	2		1
(Bangladesh) (Nepal) 2027								
Total				12	5	6	0	1

=== Under-19 Women's Asia Cup ===
Sri Lanka's Under-19 Twenty20 Asia Cup Record
Year	Result	Pos	№	Pld	W	L	T	NR
(Malaysia) 2024	4th place	4/6	6	4	1	2	0	1
Total		–	–	4	1	2	0	1

== Current squad ==
The table below lists all the players who have been selected in recent squads for Sri Lanka under-19s.

Name
Chamudi Praboda
Manudi Nanayakkara
Sanjana Kavindi
Vimoksha Balasooriya
Pramudi Methsara
Limansa Thilakarathna
Aseni Thalagune
Nethagi Isuranjali
Danodya Sewmini
Chamodi Herath
Daria Dissanayake
Rashmika Sewwandi
Umayangana Peiris
Nethmi Upeksha
Yesali Jithara
Sanuki Pathirage

== Records & statistics ==
International match summary

As of 20 December 2024

Playing records
Format	M	W	L	T	D/NR	Inaugural match
Youth Women's Twenty20 Internationals	9	2	6	0	1	14 January 2023

Youth Women's Twenty20 record versus other nations

As of 20 December 2024

ICC Full members
Opponent	M	W	L	T	NR	First match	First win
Australia	1	0	1	0	0	18 January 2023	29 January 2025
Bangladesh	2	0	2	0	0	16 January 2023	
India	2	0	2	0	0	22 January 2023	
South Africa	1	0	1	0	0	24 January 2023	

Associate members
Opponent	M	W	L	T	NR	First match	First win
Malaysia	1	1	0	0	0	15 December 2024	15 December 2024
Nepal	1	0	0	0	1	19 December 2024	
United States	1	1	0	0	0	14 January 2023	14 January 2023

=== Leading runs scorers ===
As of 24 January 2023

S/N	Players	Runs	Average	Career span
1	Vishmi Gunaratne	134	44.66	2023–Present
2	Dewmi Vihanga	113	22.60	2023–Present
3	Manudi Nanayakkara	66	16.50	2023–Present

=== Leading wickets takers ===
As of 24 January 2023

S/N	Player	Wickets	Average	Career span
1	Dewmi Vihanga	9	12.88	2023–Present
2	Vidushika Perera	5	23.80	2023–Present
3	Rashmi Nethranjali	3	38.00	2023–Present

=== Highest individual innings ===
As of 24 January 2023

S/N	Player	Score	Opposition	Match Date
1	Vishmi Gunaratne	60*	Bangladesh	16 January 2023
2	Dewmi Vihanga	55	Bangladesh	16 January 2023
3	Nethmi Senarathne	36	South Africa	24 January 2023

=== Highest individual bowling figures ===
As of 24 January 2023

S/N	Player	Score	Opposition	Match Date
1	Dewmi Vihanga	3/11	United States	14 January 2023
2	Vidushika Perera	3/25	South Africa	24 January 2023
3	Dewmi Vihanga	3/34	India	22 January 2023

=== Highest team totals ===
As of 24 January 2023

S/N	Dates	Totals	Against	Ref
1	16 January 2023	155/4, (20 Overs)	Bangladesh	
2	24 January 2023	133/8, (20 Overs)	South Africa	
3	14 January 2023	100/3, (19 Overs)	United States	

=== Lowest team totals ===
As of 24 January 2023

S/N	Dates	Totals	Against	Ref
1	22 January 2023	59/9, (20 Overs)	India	
2	18 January 2023	51/10, (13 Overs)	Australia	
