= South Africa women's national under-19 cricket team =

Under-19 women's cricket team

South Africa Under-19s
- Association: Cricket South Africa

Personnel
- Captain: Oluhle Siyo
- Coach: Dinesha Devnarain

History
- Twenty20 debut: v. India at Willowmoore Park, Benoni, South Africa; 14 January 2023
- U19 T20 World Cup wins: 0

International Cricket Council
- ICC region: Africa

The South Africa women's under-19 cricket team represents South Africa in international under-19 women's cricket. The team is administrated by Cricket South Africa.

The team played their first official international matches against India in late 2022 and early 2023, in preparation for the 2023 Under-19 Women's T20 World Cup, the first ever international women's under-19 cricket competition, held in South Africa. They reached the Super Six stage at the inaugural tournament.

== History ==
The inaugural Women's Under-19 World Cup was scheduled to take place in January 2021, but was postponed multiple times due to the COVID-19 pandemic. The tournament would eventually take place in January 2023, in South Africa. As the host nation, South Africa qualified automatically for the tournament.

In December 2022, the side competed in one of South Africa's domestic competitions, the Women's T20 Super League, losing all of their completed matches. Later in December and in January 2023, they played a five-match T20I series against India. At the Under-19 T20 World Cup, the side reached the Super Six stage, in which they finished fourth in their group.

== Recent call-ups ==
The table below lists all the players who have been selected in recent squads for South Africa under-19s. Currently, this includes the squad for their series against India and the 2023 Under-19 Women's T20 World Cup.

Name	Most Recent Call-up
Jemma Botha	2023 World Cup
Jenna Evans	2023 World Cup
Ayanda Hlubl	2023 World Cup
Elandri Janse van Rensburg	2023 World Cup
Madison Landsman	2023 World Cup
Monalisa Legodi	2023 World Cup
Simone Lourens	2023 World Cup
Karabo Meso	2023 World Cup
Refilwe Moncho	2023 World Cup
Seshnie Naldu	2023 World Cup
Nthablseng Nini	2023 World Cup
Kayla Reyneke	2023 World Cup
Oluhle Siyo	2023 World Cup
Mlane Smit	2023 World Cup
Anica Swart	2023 World Cup

== Tournament History ==
=== Under-19 T20 World Cup record ===
South Africa's U19 T20 World Cup record
Year	Result	Pos	№	Pld	W	L	T	NR
(South Africa) 2023	Super 6	6th	16	5	4	1	0	0
(Malaysia) (Thailand) 2025	Runners-up	2nd	16	7	5	1	0	1
(Bangladesh) (Nepal) 2027	To be determined							
Total	0 title			12	9	2	0	1

== Honours ==
=== ICC ===
- U19 T20 World Cup
  - Runners-up (1): 2025

== Records & statistics ==
International match summary

As of 24 January 2023

Playing records
Format	M	W	L	T	D/NR	Inaugural match
Youth Women's Twenty20 Internationals	11	4	5	0	2	27 December 2022

Youth Women's Twenty20 record versus other nations

As of 24 January 2023

ICC Full members
Opponent	M	W	L	T	NR	First match	First win
Bangladesh	1	1	0	0	0	21 January 2023	21 January 2023
India	7	0	5	0	2	27 December 2022	
Sri Lanka	1	1	0	0	0	24 January 2023	24 January 2023

Associate members
Opponent	M	W	L	T	NR	First match	First win
Scotland	1	1	0	0	0	16 January 2023	16 January 2023
United Arab Emirates	1	1	0	0	0	18 January 2023	18 January 2023

=== Leading runs scorers ===
As of 24 January 2023

S/N	Players	Runs	Average	Career span
1	Kayla Reyneke	185	35.60	2022–Present
2	Simone Lourens	157	28.20	2022–Present
3	Madison Landsman	101	18.20	2022–Present

=== Leading wickets takers ===
As of 24 January 2023

S/N	Player	Wickets	Average	Career span
1	Kayla Reyneke	11	13.50	2022–Present
2	Mlane Smit	7	8.42	2022–Present
3	Madison Landsman	6	9.50	2022–Present

=== Highest individual innings ===
As of 24 January 2023

S/N	Player	Score	Opposition	Match Date
1	Simone Lourens	61	India	14 January 2023
2	Kayla Reyneke	53	Scotland	16 January 2023
3	Kayla Reyneke	43	Sri Lanka	24 January 2023

=== Highest individual bowling figures ===
As of 24 January 2023

S/N	Player	Score	Opposition	Match Date
1	Mlane Smit	4/11	United Arab Emirates	18 January 2023
2	Simone Laurens	4/16	Scotland	16 January 2023
3	Kayla Reyneke	4/19	Bangladesh	21 January 2023
