= England women's under-19 cricket team =

Under-19 women's cricket team

- Association: England and Wales Cricket Board

Personnel
- Captain: Grace Scrivens
- Coach: Chris Guest

History
- Twenty20 debut: v. Zimbabwe at Senwes Park, Potchefstroom, South Africa; 15 January 2023
- U19 World Cup wins: 0

International Cricket Council
- ICC region: Europe
Test kit
ODI kit
T20I kit

The England women's under-19 cricket team represents England and Wales in international under-19 women's cricket. The team is administrated by the England and Wales Cricket Board (ECB).

The team played their first official matches at the 2023 ICC Under-19 Women's T20 World Cup, the first ever international women's under-19 cricket competition, in which they reached the final, where they lost to India.

== History ==
Since 2000, English Under-19 cricket teams have been formed to play matches against other national age-group and development teams. These matches carried no formal ICC designation.

The inaugural Women's Under-19 World Cup was scheduled to take place in January 2021, but was postponed multiple times due to the COVID-19 pandemic. The tournament eventually took place in January 2023 in South Africa. As a Full Member of the ICC, England qualified automatically for the tournament.

England announced their 15-player squad for the tournament on 18 October 2022. Chris Guest, Head Coach of The Blaze, was chosen as Head Coach of the team for the tournament, assisted by Laura Marsh and Darren Franklin. Grace Scrivens was later named as captain of the team. The team went unbeaten throughout the tournament to reach the final, but lost to India in the final by 7 wickets. England captain Grace Scrivens was named Player of the Tournament.

== Recent call-ups ==
The table below lists all the players who have been selected in recent squads for England under-19s. Currently, this only includes the squad for the 2023 ICC Under-19 Women's T20 World Cup.

Name	Birth date	Role	Batting style	Bowling style	Team	Most Recent Call-up
Ellie Anderson	30 October 2003 (age 22)	Bowler	Right-handed	Right-arm medium	Central Sparks	2023 World Cup
Hannah Baker	3 February 2004 (age 22)	Bowler	Right-handed	Right-arm leg break	Central Sparks	2023 World Cup
Josie Groves	5 September 2004 (age 21)	Bowler	Right-handed	Right-arm leg break	The Blaze	2023 World Cup
Liberty Heap	16 September 2003 (age 22)	All-rounder	Right-handed	Right-arm off break	North West Thunder	2023 World Cup
Niamh Holland	27 October 2004 (age 21)	All-rounder	Right-handed	Right-arm medium	Western Storm	2023 World Cup
Ryana MacDonald-Gay	12 February 2004 (age 22)	All-rounder	Right-handed	Right-arm medium	South East Stars	2023 World Cup
Emma Marlow	12 April 2004 (age 22)	Bowler	Right-handed	Right-arm off break	Northern Diamonds	2023 World Cup
Charis Pavely	24 October 2004 (age 21)	All-rounder	Left-handed	Slow left-arm orthodox	Central Sparks	2023 World Cup
Davina Perrin	8 September 2006 (age 19)	Batter	Right-handed	Right-arm medium	Central Sparks	2023 World Cup
Lizzie Scott	9 January 2004 (age 22)	Bowler	Right-handed	Right-arm medium	Northern Diamonds	2023 World Cup
Grace Scrivens	10 November 2003 (age 22)	All-rounder	Left-handed	Right-arm off break	Sunrisers	2023 World Cup
Seren Smale	13 December 2004 (age 21)	Wicket-keeper	Right-handed	–	North West Thunder	2023 World Cup
Sophia Smale	8 December 2004 (age 21)	All-rounder	Right-handed	Slow left-arm orthodox	Western Storm	2023 World Cup
Alexa Stonehouse	5 December 2004 (age 21)	Bowler	Right-handed	Left-arm medium	South East Stars	2023 World Cup
Maddie Ward	19 January 2005 (age 21)	Wicket-keeper	Right-handed	Right-arm off break	Northern Diamonds	2023 World Cup

== Tournament history ==
A red box around the year indicates tournaments played within England

Key
Champions
Runners-up
Semi-finals

=== Under-19 Women's World Cup ===
England's U19 World Cup record
Year	Result	Pos	№	Pld	W	L	T	NR
(South Africa) 2023	Runner-up	2nd	16	7	6	1	0	0
Total	1 title		16	7	6	1	0	0

== Records and statistics ==
As of 29 January 2023

-
Format	M	W	L	T	D/NR	Inaugural match
Women's under-19 Twenty20 Internationals	7	6	0	0	0	15 January 2023

As of 29 January 2023

Records against other national teams
Opponent	M	W	L	T	NR	First match	First win
Australia	1	1	0	0	0	27 January 2023	27 January 2023
India	1	0	1	0	0	29 January 2023	
Ireland	1	1	0	0	0	21 January 2023	21 January 2023
Pakistan	1	1	0	0	0	17 January 2023	17 January 2023
West Indies	1	1	0	0	0	25 January 2023	25 January 2023
Zimbabwe	1	1	0	0	0	15 January 2023	15 January 2023
Rwanda	1	1	0	0	0	19 January 2023	19 January 2023

=== Leading runs scorers ===
As of 29 January 2023

Rank	Player	Runs
1	Grace Scrivens	293
2	Niamh Holland	138
3	Seren Smale	121

=== Leading wickets takers ===
As of 29 January 2023

Rank	Player	Wickets
1	Hannah Baker	10
2	Grace Scrivens	9
3	Ellie Anderson	8

=== Highest individual innings ===
As of 29 January 2023

Rank	Player	Score	Opposition	Date
1	Grace Scrivens	93	Sri Lanka	16 January 2023
2	Liberty Heap	64	Rwanda	19 January 2023
3	Niamh Holland	59	Zimbabwe	15 January 2023

=== Best individual bowling figures ===
As of 29 January 2023

Rank	Player	Figures	Opposition	Date
1	Ellie Anderson	5/12	West Indies	25 January 2023
2	Grace Scrivens	4/2	Zimbabwe	15 January 2023
3	Hannah Baker	3/9	Ireland	21 January 2023

=== Highest team totals ===
As of 29 January 2023

Rank	Date	Total	Against	Ref
1	21 January 2023	207/2	Ireland	
2	15 January 2023	199/4	Zimbabwe	
1	19 January 2023	183/5	Rwanda	

=== Lowest team totals ===
As of 29 January 2023

Rank	Date	Total	Against	Ref
1	29 January 2023	68 all out	India	
2	27 January 2023	99 all out	Australia	
