= Qatar women's national under-19 cricket team =

Under-19 cricket team

Qatar women's under-19 cricket team
- Association: Qatar Cricket Association (QCA)

Personnel
- Captain: Romila Peter
- Coach: (India) Robin Singh

History
- Twenty20 debut: v. Nepal at Kinrara Academy Oval, Selangor; 3 June 2022

International Cricket Council
- ICC status: Associate member (2017)
- ICC region: Asian Cricket Council (ACC) Asia

The Qatar women's under-19 cricket team represents Qatar in international under-19 women's cricket. The team is administered by the Qatar Cricket Association (QCA).

== History ==
The Qatar women's national under-19 cricket team played their debut game against Nepal on 3 June 2022 at Kinrara Academy Oval, Selangor, Malaysia. Since then the team have been playing qualification round of Women's Under-19 T20 World Cup but have not yet qualified for the main tournament.

== Current squad ==
The following squad were named for the 2022 ICC Under-19 Women's T20 World Cup qualification

As of 27 May 2022

No	Player	Playing role	Date of birth
1	Romila Peter (Captain)	Right Hand Batter	13 January 2005
2	Saachi Dhadwal	Right Hand Batter/Right Arm Fast Medium	9 August 2006
3	Shrutiben Rana	Right Hand Batter/Right Arm Medium	23 July 2005
4	Aleena Khan	Right Hand Batter/Right Arm Offbreak	6 October 2007
5	Sneha Chandnani	Right Hand Batter/Right Arm Medium	7 April 2004
6	Zunaira Shirgaonkar	Right Hand Batter	2 September 2003
7	Taful Elkhair	Right Hand Batter/Right Arm Fast Medium	1 January 2006
8	Pooja Satheesh	Right Hand Batter/Right Arm Fast Medium	29 December 2004
9	Sarrinah Ahmed	Right Hand Batter/Right Arm Fast Medium	25 March 2005
10	Apsara Weerasekara	Right Hand Batter/Right Arm Fast Medium	16 December 2005
11	Hiya Ladani	Right Hand Batter/Right Arm Fast Medium	8 December 2006

== Records & statistics ==
International match summary

As of 11 July 2026

Playing records
Format	M	W	L	T	D/NR	Inaugural match
Youth Women's Twenty20 Internationals	6	1	5	0	0	11 July 2026

As of 11 July 2026

Records against other national sides
Associate members
Opponent	M	W	L	T	NR	First match	First win
Bhutan	1	1	0	0	0	9 June 2022	9 June 2022
Malaysia	1	0	1	0	0	4 June 2022	
Nepal	2	0	2	0	0	9 June 2022	
Thailand	1	0	1	0	0	6 June 2022	
United Arab Emirates	1	0	1	0	0	7 Jue 2022	

== Tournament history ==
=== ICC Women's Under-19 Cricket World Cup ===
ICC Women's Under-19 T20 World Cup records
Year	Round	Position	GP	W	L	T	NR
(South Africa) 2023	Did not qualify						
(Malaysia) (Thailand) 2025	Did not qualify						
(Bangladesh) (Nepal) 2027	To be determined						
Total	0/2	0 Title	0	0	0	0	0

=== ACC Under-19 Women's Asia Cup ===
ACC Under-19 Women's T20 Asia Cup records
Year	Round	Position	GP	W	L	T	NR
(Malaysia) 2024	Did not qualify						
Total	0/1	0 Title	0	0	0	0	0

== ICC Under-19 Women's World Cup qualification ==
ACC Under-19 Women's T20 Asia Cup records
Year	Round	Position	GP	W	L	T	NR
(Malaysia) 2022	DNQ	–	5	1	4	0	0
(United Arab Emirates) 2025	Did not participate						
Total	1/2	0 Title	5	1	4	0	0
