= India women's national under-19 cricket team =

Indian women's U19 cricket team

India Under-19s
- Association: Board of Control for Cricket in India

Personnel
- Captain: Niki Prasad
- Coach: Dhruv Gupta

Team information
- Colors: Blue
- Founded: 2022

History
- Twenty20 debut: v. New Zealand at Bandra Kurla Complex, Mumbai, India; 27 November 2022
- U19 Women's T20 World Cup wins: (gold) (2023, 2025)
- U19 Women's T20 Asia Cup wins: (gold) (2024)

International Cricket Council
- ICC region: Asia
T20I kit

The India women's national Under-19 cricket team represents India in international cricket at the Under-19 level. It is administered by the Board of Control for Cricket in India. India are the current holders of the U19 Women's T20 World Cup and the U19 Women's T20 Asia Cup.

The team played their first matches against New Zealand in late 2022, in preparation for the 2023 U19 Women's T20 World Cup, the first ever edition of the under-19 tournament.

The team has won the U19 Women's T20 World Cup in 2023 under Shafali Verma and in 2025 under Niki Prasad. Also, the team won the U19 Women's T20 Asia Cup in 2024.

== History ==
The inaugural U19 Women's T20 World Cup was scheduled to take place in January 2021, but was postponed multiple times due to the COVID-19 pandemic. The tournament eventually took place in January 2023, in South Africa. As a Full member of the ICC, India qualified automatically for the tournament. India's squad for was announced in December 2022.

In November and December 2022, in preparation for the World Cup, India played a five-match T20I series against New Zealand, winning the series 5–0. During the series, India announced their 15-player squad for the World Cup, on 5 December 2022. They also played a six-match T20I series against South Africa in the lead-up to the tournament.

At the U19 Women's T20 World Cup, the side topped both their group in the initial group stage and their Super Six group, qualifying for the semi-finals. They beat New Zealand in the semi-finals before beating England in the final by 7 wickets to claim the inaugural Women's Under-19 T20 World Cup title. India batter Shweta Sehrawat was the tournament's leading run-scorer, with 297 runs.

== Current squad ==
The list of players who were selected for the 2025 U19 Women's T20 World Cup are mentioned below:

- Niki Prasad (c)
- Sanika Chalke (vc)
- Bhavika Ahire (wk)
- Ishwari Awsare
- VJ Joshitha
- G Kamalini (wk)
- Drithi Kesari
- Anandita Kishor
- Vaishnavi Sharma
- Shabnam Shakil
- Aayushi Shukla
- Parunika Sisodia
- Gongadi Trisha
- Mithila Vinod
- Sonam Yadav

== Performance record ==
A red box around the year indicates tournaments played within India

Key
Champions
Runners-up
Semi-finals

=== U19 Women's T20 World Cup ===
Year	Result	Position	Pld	W	L	T	NR
(South Africa) 2023	Champions	1st	7	6	1	0	0
(Malaysia) 2025	Champions	1st	7	7	0	0	0
(Bangladesh) (Nepal) 2027	Qualified						
Total	2 titles		14	13	1	0	0

=== U19 Women's T20 Asia Cup ===
Year	Result	Position	Pld	W	L	T	NR
(Malaysia) 2024	Champions	1st	5	4	0	0	1
(N/A) 2026	TBD	TBC					
Total	1 title		5	4	0	0	1

== Honours ==
India Women's national under-19 cricket team honours
Type	Competition	Titles	Seasons
ICC Championships	U19 Women's T20 World Cup	2	Champions (2): 2023, 2025
ACC (Continental)	U19 Women's T20 Asia Cup	1	Champions (1): 2024

record

== Records & statistics ==
=== International match summary ===
As of 2 February 2025

Playing record
Format	M	W	L	T	D/NR	Inaugural match
Women's under-19 Twenty20 Internationals	32	27	2	0	3	27 November 2022

=== Record versus other nations ===
As of 2 February 2025

ICC Full members
Opponent	M	W	L	T	NR	First match	First win
Australia	2	1	1	0	0	9 January 2023	9 January 2023
Bangladesh	4	3	1	0	0	11 January 2023	26 January 2025
England	2	2	0	0	0	29 January 2023	29 January 2023
New Zealand	6	6	0	0	0	27 November 2022	27 November 2022
Pakistan	1	1	0	0	0	15 December 2024	15 December 2024
South Africa	8	6	0	0	2	27 December 2022	27 December 2022
Sri Lanka	3	3	0	0	0	22 January 2023	22 January 2023
West Indies	1	1	0	0	0	19 January 2025	19 January 2025

Associate members
Opponent	M	W	L	T	NR	First match	First win
Malaysia	1	1	0	0	0	21 January 2025	21 January 2025
Nepal	1	0	0	0	1		
Scotland	2	2	0	0	0	18 January 2023	18 January 2023
United Arab Emirates	1	1	0	0	0	16 January 2023	16 January 2023

=== Leading run scorers ===
As of 29 January 2023

Rank	Players	Runs	Average	Career span
1	Shweta Sehrawat	444	99.00	2022–present
2	Gongadi Trisha	238	23.20	2022–present
3	Shafali Verma	223	24.57	2022–present

=== Leading wicket takers ===
As of 29 January 2023

Rank	Player	Wickets	Average	Career span
1	Mannat Kashyap	20	10.33	2022–present
2	Parshavi Chopra	16	7.00	2022–present
3	Archana Devi	15	13.12	2022–present

=== Highest individual innings ===
As of 29 January 2023

Rank	Player	Score	Opposition	Match Date
1	Gongadi Trisha	110 not out	Scotland	28 January 2025
2	Shweta Sehrawat	92 not out	South Africa	14 January 2023
3	Shafali Verma	78	United Arab Emirates	16 January 2023

=== Best individual bowling figures ===
As of 29 January 2023

Rank	Player	Score	Opposition	Match date
1	Parshavi Chopra	4/5	Sri Lanka	22 January 2023
2	Mannat Kashyap	4/12	Scotland	18 January 2023
3	Archana Devi	3/14	Scotland	18 January 2023

=== Highest team totals ===
As of 29 January 2023

Rank	Dates	Totals	Opposition	Ref
1	16 January 2023	219/3 (20 Overs)	United Arab Emirates	
2	29 November 2022	176/6 (20 Overs)	New Zealand	
3	18 January 2023	149/4 (20 Overs)	Scotland	

=== Lowest team totals ===
As of 30 January 2023

Rank	Dates	Totals	Opposition	Ref
1	21 January 2023	87/10 (18.5 Overs)	Australia	

== See also ==
- India men's national cricket team
- India women's national cricket team
- India national under-19 cricket team
- India A cricket team
- India B cricket team
- Board of control for cricket in india (BCCI)
- BCCI Awards
- National Cricket Academy (NCA)
- Cricket in India
- Sport in India – Overview of sports in India
- Glossary of cricket terms
