= Under-19 Women's T20 Asia Cup =

Cricket tournament

- Administrator: Asian Cricket Council
- Format: T20I
- First edition: 2024 Malaysia
- Latest edition: 2024 Malaysia
- Next edition: 2026 Nepal and Bangladesh
- Number of teams: 6 (8 from 2026)
- Current champion: India (1st title)
- Most successful: India (1 title)
- Most runs: (India) Gongadi Trisha (159)
- Most wickets: (India) Aayushi Shukla (10)
- Website: Website

The Under-19 Women's T20 Asia Cup is a cricket tournament organised by the Asian Cricket Council. It is held between under-19 teams from its member nations. The first edition was held in 2024 in Malaysia. India are the defending champions.

== History ==
Winners of ACC U-19 Women's Asia Cup
Season	Format	Champion
2024	T20I	India
2026	T20I	

On 11 September 2024, the ACC announced the launch of the tournament during its executive board meeting in Kuala Lumpur, Malaysia. The tournament is set to be staged biennially to help Asian teams prepare for the Under-19 World Cup.

== Editions and results ==
Year	Host	Teams	Final			
Year	Host	Teams	Venue	Winner	Result	Runners-up
2024	Malaysia	6	Bayuemas Oval, Kuala Lumpur	India; 117/7 (20 overs)	India won by 41 runs Scorecard	Bangladesh; 76 (18.3 overs)
2026	TBD	8	TBC			

== Performance by nations ==
The table below provides an overview of the performances of teams over past ACC Women's Under-19 T20 Asia Cup tournaments.

Team	Appearances			Best result	Statistics					
Team	Total	First	Latest	Best result	Played	Won	Lost	Tie	NR	Win%
India	1	2024	2024	Champions (2024)	5	4	0	0	1	80
Bangladesh	1	2024	2024	Runners Up (2024)	5	3	2	0	0	60
Nepal	1	2024	2024	Super Four	4	1	1	0	2	25
Sri Lanka	1	2024	2024	Super Four	4	1	2	0	1	25
Malaysia	1	2024	2024	Group stage	3	0	2	0	1	0
Pakistan	1	2024	2024	Group stage	3	0	2	0	1	0

== Others Format ==
=== ACC Women's Under-19 Premier Cup ===
Year	Host Nation(s)	Final Venue	Final		
Year	Host Nation(s)	Final Venue	Winner	Result	Runner-up
2026	Malaysia	UKM Bangi Stadium	United Arab Emirates; Thailand	No results	—N/a
