= Nepal women's national under-19 cricket team =

Under-19 Women's Cricket Team

Nepal Under-19s Women
- Association: Cricket Association of Nepal

Personnel
- Captain: Sony Pakhrin
- Vice-captain: N/A
- Coach: Mahesh Prasad Rijal

Team information
- Colors: Red and Blue
- Founded: 2022
- Home ground: Pokhara International Cricket Stadium, Pokhara
- Capacity: 18,500

History
- Twenty20 debut: v. Qatar at UKM-YSD Cricket Oval, Bangi; 3 June 2022
- U19 World Cup wins: 0
- Under-19 Women's T20 World Cup Asia Qualifiers wins: (gold) (2025)

International Cricket Council
- ICC region: Asia
T20I kit
- As of 10 June 2022

Nepal national cricket teams
Women's	Men's	Men's A	Women's U19	Men's U19

The Nepal Women's National Under-19 Cricket Team (Nepali: नेपाल महिला राष्ट्रिय अन्डर-१९ क्रिकेट टोली) represents Nepal in international under-19 women's cricket. The team is administered by the Cricket Association of Nepal (CAN), is currently having a historic run as one of Asia's most dominant rising associate teams.

Mahesh Prasad Rijal serves as the head coach of the team whereas Puja Mahato is the current Nepal U19 women's captains the team in all formats. Sony Pakhrin is serving as the vice-captain of the team.

The side played for the first time in the Asia Qualifier for the 2022 ICC Under-19 Women's T20 World Cup qualification. The junior women’s team had finished third in the ICC Women’s U-19 World Cup Asian Qualification, 2022. In 2024, under the captaincy of Puja Mahato, Nepal qualified to 2025 Under-19 Women's T20 World Cup and 2024 ACC Women's Under-19 T20 Asia Cup as a result of finishing first in points table in 2025 ICC Under-19 Women's T20 World Cup qualification. Nepal is set to co-organize the ICC U-19 Women’s World Cup in 2027 with Bangladesh.

== Tournament History ==
A red box around the year indicates tournaments played within Nepal

Key
Champions
Runners-up
3rd position

=== Under-19 World Cup & Qualification Record ===
U19 World Cup record								World Cup Qualification record								
Year	Result	Position	P	W	L	D	NR	Year	Result	Position	P	W	L	D	NR	Remarks
(South Africa) 2023	Did not qualify							(Malaysia) 2023	Round Robin	3/6	5	3	2	0	0	Not qualified
(Malaysia) 2025	Group Stage	14/16	4	1	3	0	0	(United Arab Emirates) 2025	Winners	1/4	6	5	1	0	0	Qualified
(Bangladesh) (Nepal) 2027	Qualified as a Host nation							(Malaysia) 2027	Did not participate (Qualified as a Host Nation)							
Total	Group Stage	14/16	4	1	3	0	0	Total	1 Title	1/5	11	8	3	0	0	Qualified on Multiple Occasions

=== Under-19 Women's Asia Cup Record ===
Year	Result	Pos	№	Pld	W	L	T	NR
(Malaysia) 2024	Super Four	3rd place, bronze medalist(s)	6	4	1	1	0	2
(N/A) 2026	TBD	TBC						
Total				4	1	1	0	2

=== Under-19 Women's Premier Cup Record ===
Year	Result	Pos	№	Pld	W	L	T	NR
(Malaysia) 2026	Semi-finals	3rd place, bronze medalist(s)	6	6	5	0	1	0
(N/A) 2028	TBD	TBC						
Total				0	0	0	0	0

== Current Squad ==
The list of final squad for the 2026 ACC Women's Under-19 Premier Cup.

Name	Birth date	Batting style	Bowling style	Domestic Team
Captain
Sony Pakhrin (C)	2 November 2007 (age 18)	Right-handed	Right-arm medium	Bagmati Province
Batters
Sana Praveen	22 February 2007 (age 19)	Right-handed	N/A	Madhesh Province
Trishana BK	23 December 2007 (age 18)	Right-handed	Right-arm off break	Karnali Province
Anjila Pathak	16 May 2012 (age 14)	Right-handed	N/A	Lumbini Province
Sneha Mahara	4 February 2007 (age 19)	Right-handed	Right-arm off break	Sudurpashchim Province
All-rounders
Anu Kadayat	16 April 2007 (age 19)	Right-handed	Right-arm medium	Bagmati Province
Manisha Chaudhary
Sabitra Dhami	17 April 2008 (age 18)	Right-handed	Right-arm medium	Sudurpashchim Province
Karuna Bistaa		Right-handed	N/A	Sudurpashchim Province
Pratima Shah				Madhesh Province
Wicket-keepers
Alisha Kumari Yadav	22 October 2006 (age 19)	Right-handed	-	Madhesh Province
Bowlers
Manisha Upadhyay
Rachana Chaudhary	5 October 2007 (age 19)	Left-handed	Left-arm medium	Gandaki Province
Riya Sharma	19 June 2008 (age 18)	Right-handed	Slow left-arm Orthodox	Koshi Province
Krishma Gurung	1 March 2007 (age 19)	Right-handed	Right-arm medium	Bagmati Province
Prisana Rana Magar				Koshi Province
Sakshi Yadav				Madhesh Province
Ashna Chaudhary	17 November 2007 (age 18)			Lumbini Province

== Support Staffs ==
Position	Name
Cricket Manager	(Nepal) Binod Das
Team Manager	(Nepal) Maya Ghimire Gyawali
Head coach	(Nepal) Mahesh Prasad Rijal
Assistant Coach	(Nepal) Janaki Kumari Bhatta
Mentor	
Bowling Consultant	
Batting Consultant	
Consultant Coach	
Analyst	(Nepal) Raman Siwakoti
Physiotherapist	(Nepal) Neha Shah
Trainer	(Nepal) Monika Yadav
Team Doctor	

== Records & Statistics ==
International Match Summary

As of 18 July 2026

Playing records
Format	M	W	L	T	D/NR	Inaugural match
Youth Women's Twenty20 Internationals	24	14	7	1	2	3 June 2022

Youth Women's Twenty20 record versus other nations

As of 18 July 2026

ICC Full members
Opponent	M	W	L	T	NR	First match	First win
Australia	1	0	1	0	0	22 January 2025	
Bangladesh	2	0	2	0	0	20 December 2024	
India	1	0	0	0	1	17 December 2024	
Pakistan	1	1	0	0	0	16 December 2024	16 December 2024
Sri Lanka	1	0	0	0	1	19 December 2024	

Associate members
Opponent	M	W	L	T	NR	First match	First win
Bhutan	1	1	0	0	0	6 June 2022	6 June 2022
Hong Kong	1	1	0	0	0	14 July 2026	14 July 2026
Indonesia	1	1	0	0	0	18 July 2026	18 July 2026
Japan	1	1	0	0	0	15 July 2026	15 July 2026
Kuwait	2	2	0	0	0	7 November 2024	7 November 2024
Malaysia	1	1	0	0	0	9 June 2022	9 June 2022
Qatar	2	2	0	0	0	3 June 2022	3 June 2022
Scotland	1	0	1	0	0	20 January 2025	
Singapore	1	1	0	0	0	12 July 2026	12 July 2026
Thailand	3	2	1	0	0	7 June 2022	6 November 2024
United Arab Emirates	4	1	2	1	0	4 June 2022	13 November 2024

=== Leading Runs Scorers ===
As of 13 November 2024

S/N	Players	Runs	Average	Career span
1	Puja Mahato	272	54.40	2024–Present
2	Sabitri Dhami	253	64.10	2024–Present
3	Sana Praveen	143	28.60	2024–Present
4	Sony Pakhrin	119	29.75	2023–Present

=== Leading Wickets Takers ===
As of 13 November 2024

S/N	Player	Wickets	Average	Career span
1	Rachana Kumari Chaudhary	15	5.64	2024–Present
2	Puja Mahato	10	5.00	2024–Present
3	Riya Sharma	18	6.22	2024–Present

=== Highest Individual Innings ===
As of 13 November 2024

S/N	Player	Score	Opposition	Match Date
1	Puja Mahato	135*	Kuwait	12 November 2024
2	Sana Praveen	98	Singapore	12 July 2026
3	Sana Praveen	90	Thailand	10 November 2024

=== Best Individual Bowling Figures ===
As of 13 November 2024

S/N	Player	Score	Opposition	Match Date
1	Puja Mahato	5/8	Kuwait	12 November 2024
2	Rachana Kumari Chaudhary	4/10	Thailand	6 November 2024

=== Highest Team Totals ===
As of 17 July 2026

S/N	Dates	Totals	Against	Ref
1	12 November 2024	213/2, (20 Overs)	Kuwait	
2	14 July 2026	211/6, (20 Overs)	Hong Kong	
3	12 July 2026	199/0, (20 Overs)	Singapore	
4	10 November 2024	139/9, (20.0 Overs)	Thailand	

=== Lowest Team Totals ===
As of 17 July 2026

S/N	Dates	Totals	Against	Ref
1	4 June 2022	8/10, (8.1 Overs)	United Arab Emirates	
2	7 June 2022	40/10, (19.5 overs)	Thailand	
3	18 January 2025	52/10, (18.2 overs)	Bangladesh	
4	20 December 2024	54/8, (11 overs)	Bangladesh	
5	22 January 2025	56/8, (20 overs)	Australia	

== See also ==
- Nepal national men's cricket team
- Nepal national women's cricket team
- Nepal national under-19 cricket team
