= Bhutan women's national under-19 cricket team =

Under-19 cricket team

Bhutan women's under-19 cricket team
- Association: Bhutan Cricket Council Board (BCCB)

Personnel
- Captain: Ngawang Choden
- Coach: (Sri Lanka) Anton Trishane Nonis

History
- Twenty20 debut: v. United Arab Emirates at Kinrara Academy Oval, Selangor; 3 June 2022

International Cricket Council
- ICC status: Associate member (2017)
- ICC region: ACC (Asia)

The Bhutan women's under-19 cricket team represents Bhutan in international under-19 women's cricket. The team is administered by the Bhutan Cricket Council Board (BCCB).

== Current squad ==
The following cricketers were named in Bhutan's squad the 2022 ICC Under-19 Women's T20 World Cup qualification

As of 27 May 2022

No	Player	Playing role	Date of birth
1	Ngawang Choden	Batter/wicketkeeper	7 November 2006
2	Pema Yangchen	Right-hand batter	17 June 2005
3	Chado Om	Right-hand batter	3 February 2004
4	Sangay Wangmo	Right-hand batter	26 February 2006
5	Sonam	All-rounder	17 October 2004
6	Norbu Wangchuk	Right-hand batter	25 August 2004
7	Eva Yangzom	All-rounder	21 December 2004
8	Anjuli Ghalley	All-rounder	23 June 2004
9	Chencho Dema	All-rounder	3 April 2005
10	Sangay Wangmo	Right-hand batter	16 November 2004
11	Sangay Zangmo	Right-hand batter	27 April 2006

== Records & statistics ==
International match summary

As of 9 June 2024

Playing records
Format	M	W	L	T	D/NR	Inaugural match
Youth Women's Twenty20 Internationals	5	0	5	0	0	3 June 2022

As of 9 June 2022

Records against other national sides
Associate members
Opponent	M	W	L	T	NR	First match	First win
Malaysia	1	0	1	0	0	7 June 2022	
Nepal	1	0	1	0	0	6 June 2022	
Qatar	1	0	1	0	0	9 June 2022	
Thailand	1	0	1	0	0	4 June 2022	
United Arab Emirates	1	0	1	0	0	3 June 2022	

== Under-19 World Cup record ==
Bhutan's Under-19 Twenty20 World Cup Record
Year	Result	Pos	№	Pld	W	L	T	NR
(South Africa) 2023	Did not qualify							
(Malaysia) 2025	Did not Participate							
(Bangladesh) (Nepal) 2027	Did not qualify							
Total				0	0	0	0	0

== Under-19 Women's Asia Cup record ==
Bhutan's Under-19 Twenty20 Asia Cup Record
Year	Result	Pos	№	Pld	W	L	T	NR
(Malaysia) 2024	Did not Qualified							
Total				0	0	0	0	0

== Under-19 Women's World Cup qualifiers record ==
Bhutan's Under-19 World Cup Qualifiers Cup Record
Year	Result	Pos	№	Pld	W	L	T	NR
(Malaysia) 2022	Round-robin	6/6	6	5	0	5	0	0
(United Arab Emirates) 2024	Did not participate							
Total	1/2			5	0	5	0	0
