= Miané Smit =

South African cricketer (born 2005)

Personal information
- Born: 2 February 2005 (age 21); Bloemfontein, Free State, South Africa
- Batting: Right-handed
- Bowling: Right-arm off break
- Role: All-rounder

International information
- National side: South Africa
- ODI debut (cap 94): 7 May 2025 v India
- Last ODI: 9 May 2025 v Sri Lanka
- ODI shirt no.: 43
- T20I debut (cap 64): 20 June 2025 v West Indies
- Last T20I: 23 June 2025 v West Indies
- T20I shirt no.: 43

Domestic team information
- Years: Team
- 2018/19–present: Free State

Career statistics
Competition	WODI	WT20I	LA	WT20
Matches	2	3	28	25
Runs scored	47	81	662	307
Batting average	23.50	40.50	26.48	20.46
100s/50s	0/0	0/1	0/4	0/0
Top score	39	59*	91	43
Balls bowled	60	–	535	243
Wickets	1	–	22	10
Bowling average	55.00	–	18.86	21.60
5 wickets in innings	0	–	0	0
10 wickets in match	0	–	0	0
Best bowling	1/35	–	3/33	2/12
Catches/stumpings	1/–	0/–	10/–	12/–
Medal record
Women's cricket
Representing South Africa
African Games
Silver medal – second place	2023 Accra
- Source: ESPNcricinfo, 16 April 2025

Miané Smit (born 2 February 2005) is a South African cricketer who plays for Free State in domestic cricket. She plays as an all-rounder.

== Domestic career ==
Smit made her List A debut for Free State on 29 March 2019, against Northerns in the final of 2018–19 CSA Women's Provincial League. She made her Women's Twenty20 debut against KwaZulu-Natal Coastal, on 27 October 2019 in 2019–20 CSA Women's Provincial T20 Competition.

== International career ==
In December 2022, Smit was selected in the South Africa Under-19 squad for the 2023 ICC Under-19 Women's T20 World Cup. She played four matches at the tournament, took 7 wickets at an average of 8.42 with best bowling 4/11 against UAE. In September 2023, she was named in South Africa Emerging squad against New Zealand for the practice match.

In March 2024, she was named in the South Africa Emerging team for the 2023 African Games. In September 2024, she was named in South Africa women's team as a travelling reserve for the 2024 Women's T20 World Cup.

In April 2025, she earned her maiden call-up for South Africa's ODI squad for the Tri-Nation Series against Sri Lanka and India. In May 2025, she named in South Africa's T20I and ODI squads for their series against the West Indies.
