= Maggie Clark =

Australian cricketer

Personal information
- Full name: Maggie Ellen Clark
- Born: 15 March 2007 (age 19); Adelaide, South Australia
- Batting: Left-handed
- Bowling: Right-arm fast-medium
- Role: Bowler

Domestic team information
- Years: Team
- 2024/25–present: Adelaide Strikers (squad no. 7)

Career statistics
Competition	WT20
Matches	4
Runs scored	3
Batting average	1.50
100s/50s	0/0
Top score	2
Balls bowled	78
Wickets	4
Bowling average	22.00
5 wickets in innings	0
10 wickets in match	0
Best bowling	2/13
Catches/stumpings	1/–
- Source: ESPNcricinfo, 20 October 2024

Maggie Ellen Clark (born 15 March 2007) is an Australian cricketer who plays for the Adelaide Strikers. She plays as a right-arm fast-medium bowler and a left-handed batter.

== Career ==
In December 2022, Clark was named as part of Australia's squad for the 2023 Under-19 Women's T20 World Cup. She picked up 12 wickets, the most of any player in the tournament.

In October 2024, she was signed to the Adelaide Strikers ahead of WBBL|10. She debuted against the Perth Scorchers in the T20 Spring Challenge on 11 October, taking 2/13.
