= South Africa women's cricket team in the West Indies in 2025 =

International cricket tour

	West Indies	South Africa
- Dates: 11 – 23 June 2025
Captains	Hayley Matthews	Laura Wolvaardt

One Day International series
- Results: South Africa won the 3-match series 2–1
Most runs	Hayley Matthews (104)	Tazmin Brits (184)
Most wickets	Afy Fletcher (8)	Nonkululeko Mlaba (7)
- Player of the series: Tazmin Brits (SA)

Twenty20 International series
- Results: West Indies won the 3-match series 2–1
Most runs	Hayley Matthews (147)	Tazmin Brits (132)
Most wickets	Afy Fletcher (5)	Marizanne Kapp (4)
- Player of the series: Hayley Matthews (WI)

The South Africa women's cricket team toured the West Indies in June 2025 to play the West Indies women's cricket team. The tour consisted of three One Day International (ODI) and three Twenty20 International (T20I) matches. In February 2025, the Cricket West Indies (CWI) confirmed the fixtures for the tour, as a part of the 2025 home international season.

== Squads ==
West Indies	South Africa
ODIs & T20Is	ODIs & T20Is
Hayley Matthews (c); Shemaine Campbelle (vc, wk); Aaliyah Alleyne; Jahzara Claxton; Afy Fletcher; Shabika Gajnabi; Jannillea Glasgow; Realeanna Grimmond; Shawnisha Hector (Note: Only in T20I series); Chinelle Henry; Zaida James; Qiana Joseph; Mandy Mangru; Ashmini Munisar; Karishma Ramharack; Stafanie Taylor (Note: Only in ODI series)	Laura Wolvaardt (c); Tazmin Brits; Nadine de Klerk; Annerie Dercksen; Ayanda Hlubi; Sinalo Jafta (wk); Marizanne Kapp; Ayabonga Khaka; Masabata Klaas; Suné Luus; Karabo Meso (wk); Nonkululeko Mlaba; Tumi Sekhukhune; Nondumiso Shangase; Miané Smit; Chloe Tryon

On 20 June, Stafanie Taylor was ruled out of the T20I series due to a shoulder injury, with Shawnisha Hector added as her replacement.

== ODI series ==
=== 1st ODI ===
11 June 2025
10:00
Scorecard

South Africa; 232/9 (50 overs)	v	West Indies; 180/6 (32 overs)
Tazmin Brits 57 (65); Aaliyah Alleyne 2/35 (8 overs)		Qiana Joseph 60 (58); Ayanda Hlubi 3/50 (7 overs)

West Indies won by 4 wickets (DLS method)
Three Ws Oval, Bridgetown
Umpires: Gregory Brathwaite (WI) and Nimali Perera (SL)
Player of the match: Qiana Joseph (WI)

- West Indies won the toss and elected to field.
- West Indies were set a revised target of 180 runs in 34 overs due to rain.
- This was the first women's ODI to be played at this venue.
- Tazmin Brits (SA) became the second quickest South African woman to reach 1,000 runs in ODIs after Laura Wolvaardt.
- Hayley Matthews (WI) became the third West Indian woman to reach 3,000 runs in ODIs.

=== 2nd ODI ===
14 June 2025
10:00
Scorecard

South Africa; 309/9 (50 overs)	v	West Indies; 269 (50 overs)
Sune Luus 76 (65); Afy Fletcher 4/64 (10 overs)		Hayley Matthews 56 (58); Nonkululeko Mlaba 4/33 (10 overs)

South Africa won by 40 runs
Three Ws Oval, Bridgetown
Umpires: Nimali Perera (SL) and Jacqueline Williams (WI)
Player of the match: Sune Luus (SA)

- West Indies won the toss and elected to field.
- Marizanne Kapp (SA) played in her 150th ODI match.
- Chloe Tryon (SA) set a new record for the most sixes (71) in ODIs for South Africa, surpassing Lizelle Lee (70).

=== 3rd ODI ===
17 June 2025
10:00
Scorecard

South Africa; 278/6 (45.5 overs)	v	West Indies; 121 (27.5 overs)
Tazmin Brits 101 (91); Afy Fletcher 3/53 (10 overs)		Jahzara Claxton 43 (32); Masabata Klaas 4/25 (6 overs)

South Africa won by 166 runs (DLS method)
Three Ws Oval, Bridgetown
Umpires: Nimali Perera (SL) and Jacqueline Williams (WI)
Player of the match: Tazmin Brits (SA)

- West Indies won the toss and elected to field.
- Rain interrupted South Africa's innings at 45.5 overs.
- West Indies were set a revised target of 288 runs in 39 overs.

== T20I series ==
=== 1st T20I ===
20 June 2025
14:00
Scorecard

South Africa; 183/6 (20 overs)	v	West Indies; 133/6 (20 overs)
Tazmin Brits 98* (63); Jahzara Claxton 3/39 (4 overs)		Jannillea Glasgow 53* (44); Marizanne Kapp 2/27 (3 overs)

South Africa won by 50 runs
Three Ws Oval, Bridgetown
Umpires: Candace la Borde (WI) and Nimali Perera (SL)
Player of the match: Tazmin Brits (SA)

- West Indies won the toss and elected to field.
- Miané Smit (SA) made her T20I debut.
- This was the first women's T20I to be played at this venue.

=== 2nd T20I ===
22 June 2025
10:00
Scorecard

South Africa; 113/6 (20 overs)	v	West Indies; 116/4 (19.2 overs)
Annerie Dercksen 21* (17); Afy Fletcher 2/13 (4 overs)		Hayley Matthews 63* (56); Nonkululeko Mlaba 2/17 (4 overs)

West Indies won by 6 wickets
Three Ws Oval, Bridgetown
Umpires: Maria Abbott (WI) and Nimali Perera (SL)
Player of the match: Hayley Matthews (WI)

- West Indies won the toss and elected to field.
- Shawnisha Hector (WI) made her T20I debut.

=== 3rd T20I ===
23 June 2025
14:00
Scorecard

South Africa; 147/6 (20 overs)	v	West Indies; 148/4 (18.3 overs)
Miané Smit 59* (38); Karishma Ramharack 2/18 (4 overs)		Hayley Matthews 65 (50); Marizanne Kapp 2/27 (4 overs)

West Indies won by 6 wickets
Three Ws Oval, Bridgetown
Umpires: Nimali Perera (SL) and Jacqueline Williams (WI)
Player of the match: Hayley Matthews (WI)

- South Africa won the toss and elected to bat.
