= Thailand women's national under-19 cricket team =

Under-19 cricket team

Thailand Women's Under-19 cricket team
- Association: Cricket Association of Thailand

Personnel
- Captain: Thipatcha Putthawong

International Cricket Council
- ICC region: ACC

The Thailand women's national under-19 cricket team represents Thailand in international under-19 women's cricket. The team is administered by Cricket Association of Thailand.

Thipatcha Putthawong serves as the Thailand u19 women's captains team in all formats. The side played for the first time in the 2022 Under-19 Women's T20 World Cup Asia Qualifier for the 2023 Under-19 Women's T20 World Cup.

== History ==
The inaugural Women's Under-19 World Cup was scheduled to take place in January 2021, but was postponed multiple times due to the COVID-19 pandemic. The tournament was eventually held two years later, in January 2023, in South Africa.

== Tournament history ==
=== Under-19 World Cup ===
Thailand U19 World Cup record
Year	Result	Position	P	W	L	D	NR
(South Africa) 2023	Did not qualify						
(Malaysia) 2025	Did not qualify						
(Bangladesh) (Nepal) 2027	Did not qualify						

== Recent call-ups ==
- Banthida Leephatthana - born on July 20, 2006 (18 yrs)

== Records & Statistics ==
As of 24 October 2024

-
Format	M	W	L	T	D/NR	Inaugural match
Women's under-19 Twenty20 Internationals	5	4	1	0	0	3 June 2022

As of 24 October 2024

Records against other national sides
Associate members
Opponent	M	W	L	T	NR	First match	First win
Malaysia	1	1	0	0	0	3 June 2022	3 June 2022
Bhutan	1	1	0	0	0	4 June 2022	4 June 2022
Qatar	1	1	0	0	0	6 June 2022	6 June 2022
Nepal	3	1	2	0	0	7 June 2022	7 June 2022
United Arab Emirates	1	0	1	0	0	9 June 2022	
