= Rwanda women's national under-19 cricket team =

Under-19 cricket team

Rwanda Women's Under-19 cricket team
- Association: Rwanda Cricket Association

Personnel
- Captain: Gisele Ishimwe
- Coach: Leonard Nhamburo

History
- Twenty20 debut: v. Pakistan at Senwes Park, Potchefstroom, South Africa; 15 January 2023
- U19 World Cup wins: 0

International Cricket Council
- ICC region: Africa

The Rwanda women's under-19 cricket team represents Rwanda in international under-19 women's cricket. The team is administered by the Rwanda Cricket Association (RCA).

Rwanda qualified for the inaugural ICC Under-19 Women's T20 World Cup via winning the Africa Qualifier, thereby becoming the first Rwandan team to qualify for an ICC tournament. They reached the Super Six stage at the tournament, winning two of their matches.

== History ==
Rwanda competed in the Women's African Under-19s Championship between 2009–10 and 2014–15.

The inaugural Women's Under-19 World Cup was initially scheduled for January 2021, but was postponed multiple times due to the COVID-19 pandemic. The tournament was eventually held in January 2023, in South Africa. Rwanda competed in the Africa Qualifier for the tournament in September 2022. They finished second in their group, winning three of their four matches to qualify for the semi-finals. They went on to beat Uganda in the semi-finals and Tanzania, by 6 wickets, in the final. It was the first time that a Rwandan side had qualified for a Cricket World Cup in any format.

Rwanda announced their squad for the tournament on 18 December 2022, with Leonard Nhamburo announced as Head Coach of the side. Rwanda beat both Zimbabwe and the West Indies as they reached the Super Six stage of the tournament. Rwanda bowler Henriette Ishimwe took four wickets in four balls against Zimbabwe.

== Recent call-ups ==
The table below lists all the players who have been selected in recent squads for Rwanda under-19s. Currently, this only includes the squad for the 2023 Under-19 Women's T20 World Cup.

Name	Most Recent Call-up
Divine Gihozo Ishimwe	2023 World Cup
Gisele Ishimwe	2023 World Cup
Henriette Ishimwe	2023 World Cup
Zurafat Ishimwe	2023 World Cup
Henriette Isimbi	2023 World Cup
Cesarie Muragajimana	2023 World Cup
Belise Murekatete	2023 World Cup
Sharila Niyomuhoza	2023 World Cup
Marie Jose Tumukunde	2023 World Cup
Sylvia Usabyimana	2023 World Cup
Giovannis Uwase	2023 World Cup
Merveille Uwase	2023 World Cup
Cynthia Tuyizere	2023 World Cup
Rosine Uwera	2023 World Cup

== Records & statistics ==
International match summary

As of 22 January 2023

Playing records
Format	M	W	L	T	D/NR	Inaugural match
Youth Women's Twenty20 Internationals	5	2	3	0	0	15 January 2023

Youth Women's Twenty20 record versus other nations

As of 22 January 2023

ICC Full members
Opponent	M	W	L	T	NR	First match	First win
England	1	0	1	0	0	19 January 2023	
Pakistan	1	0	1	0	0	15 January 2023	
New Zealand	1	0	1	0	0	22 January 2023	
West Indies	1	1	0	0	0	22 January 2023	22 January 2023
Zimbabwe	1	1	0	0	0	17 January 2023	17 January 2023

=== Leading runs scorers ===
As of 22 January 2023

S/N	Players	Runs	Average	Career span
1	Gisele Ishimwe	133	33.25	2023–Present
2	Cynthia Tuyizere	72	14.40	2023–Present
3	Henriette Ishimwe	60	12.00	2023–Present

=== Leading wickets takers ===
As of 22 January 2023

S/N	Player	Wickets	Average	Career span
1	Sylvia Usabyimana	7	11.42	2023–Present
2	Henriette Ishimwe	6	13.66	2023–Present
3	Zurafat Ishimwe	5	19.60	2023–Present

=== Highest individual innings ===
As of 22 January 2023

S/N	Player	Score	Opposition	Match Date
1	Gisele Ishimwe	40	Pakistan	15 January 2023
2	Gisele Ishimwe	34	Zimbabwe	17 January 2023
3	Gisele Ishimwe	31*	West Indies	22 January 2023

=== Highest individual bowling figures ===
As of 22 January 2023

S/N	Player	Score	Opposition	Match Date
1	Marie Jose Tumukunde	4/8	West Indies	22 January 2023
2	Gisele Ishimwe	4/13	Zimbabwe	17 January 2023
3	Sylvia Usabyimana	4/20	West Indies	22 January 2023

=== Highest team totals ===
As of 22 January 2023

S/N	Dates	Totals	Against	Ref
1	17 January 2023	119/8, (20 Overs)	Zimbabwe	
2	15 January 2023	106/8, (20 Overs)	Pakistan	

=== Lowest team totals ===
As of 22 January 2023

S/N	Dates	Totals	Against	Ref
1	21 January 2023	96/7, (20 Overs)	New Zealand	
2	22 January 2023	71/6, (18.2 Overs)	West Indies	
3	19 January 2023	45/10, (17 Overs)	England	

== Under-19 World Cup record ==
Rwanda's U19 Twenty20 World Cup Record
Year	Result	Pos	№	Pld	W	L	T	NR
(South Africa) 2023	Super 6	–	16	5	2	3	0	0
(Malaysia) (Thailand) 2025	Did not qualify							
(Bangladesh) (Nepal) 2027	To be determined							
Total				5	2	3	0	0
