= Shweta Sehrawat =

Indian cricketer (born 2004)

Personal information
- Full name: Shweta Sehrawat
- Born: 26 February 2004 (age 22)
- Batting: Right-handed
- Bowling: Right-arm off break
- Role: Batting all-rounder

Domestic team information
- Years: Team
- 2017–present: Delhi
- 2023–present: UP Warriorz
Medal record
Women's Cricket
Representing India
ICC Under-19 Women’s T20 World Cup
Winner	2022 South Africa
- Source: ESPNcricinfo, 15 January 2023

Shweta Sehrawat (born 26 February 2004) is an Indian women's cricketer who currently plays for the Delhi women's cricket team. She was the vice-captain of the India women's national under-19 cricket team for the 2023 ICC Under-19 Women's T20 World Cup.

== Career ==
Sehrawat first played for Delhi women's under-19 team in October 2018. She made her domestic cricket debut for Delhi women in March 2021. On 17 March, she achieved her maiden List-A hundred, with a score of 118 against Meghalaya women.

In May 2021, she informed National Cricket Academy (NCA) chief VVS Laxman that she would not be able to attend the camp due to her 12th board examinations. She drafted an email and sent it to the authorities, requesting them to allow her to attend the second half of the camp. Laxman approved her request to attend the camp after her examinations. She scored a century in the second match of the camp, which led to her being selected for the C team in NCA Under-19 zonal competition. She scored two hundreds in six matches in the competition.

Sehrawat made her Women's Twenty20 debut in April 2022. She scored her maiden Women's T20 fifty, with a 43-ball 60 against Manipur in October 2022. In November 2022, she led India B team to the title in the Women's Under-19 Challenger Trophy. She was also the top-scorer of the tournament, with 163 runs at an average of 40.75. In the same month, She also captained India A team to the title in Women's Under-19 quadrangular series which also featured India B, Sri Lanka Under-19 and West Indies Under-19. She was the leading run-scorer with 164 runs, and her strike-rate of 151.85 was the highest in the quadrangular series. She was then selected to captain the India women's under-19 team in a five-match T20 series against New Zealand women's under-19 team. She led the team to a 5–0 series win.

In December 2022, Sehrawat was selected as the vice-captain of the Indian squad for the 2023 ICC Under-19 Women's T20 World Cup. In India's inaugural match of the tournament, she scored 57-ball 92* against South Africa, which included 20 fours. This led India to a win by 21 balls remaining, with Sehrawat named as Player of the Match. She became the first Indian to score a fifty in the ICC Women's Under-19 World Cup. During the innings, the captain Shafali Verma provided her regular advice, batting from the other end. At the conclusion of the match, Sehrawat described this innings as her "best ever T20 knock".

Sehrawat was coached by Dipti Dhyani, a former Indian women's cricketer, at Karnail Singh Stadium in Delhi. Dhyani described Sehrawat as a bottom-handed player who is good at using her feet and playing spin. Mignon du Preez said that her playing style is similar to Harmanpreet Kaur's.
