= Malaysia women's national under-19 cricket team =

Under-19 cricket team

Malaysia Women's Under-19 cricket team
- Association: Malaysia Cricket Association (MCA)

Personnel
- Captain: Elsa Hunter

History
- Twenty20 debut: v. Thailand at Kinrara Academy Oval, Selangor; 6 June 2022

International Cricket Council
- ICC status: Associate member (1967)
- ICC region: ACC (Asia)

The Malaysia women's national under-19 cricket team represents Malaysia in international under-19 women's cricket. The team is administered by Malaysia Cricket Association (MCA).

The side played for the first time in the 2022 Under-19 Women's T20 World Cup Asia Qualifier for the 2023 Under-19 Women's T20 World Cup.

Malaysia automatically qualified for the 2025 Under-19 Women's T20 World Cup by virtue of host.

== Under-19 World Cup record ==
Malaysia's Under-19 Twenty20 World Cup Record
Year	Result	Pos	№	Pld	W	L	T	NR
(South Africa) 2023	Did not qualify							
(Malaysia) 2025	Qualified as a Host Nation							
(Bangladesh) (Nepal) 2027	Did not qualify							
Total				0	0	0	0	0

== Under-19 Women's Asia Cup record ==
Malaysia's Under-19 Twenty20 Asia Cup Record
Year	Result	Pos	№	Pld	W	L	T	NR
(Malaysia) 2024	Group stage	5/6	6	3	0	2	0	1
Total				3	0	2	0	1

== Records & Statistics ==
As of 18 December 2024

Format	M	W	L	T	D/NR	Inaugural match
Women's under-19 Twenty20 Internationals	8	2	5	0	1	3 June 2022

As of 18 December 2024

Records against other national sides
ICC Full members
Opponent	M	W	L	T	NR	First match	First win
Bangladesh	1	0	1	0	0	17 December 2024	
Pakistan	1	0	0	0	1	18 December 2024	
Sri Lanka	1	0	1	0	0	15 December 2024	
Associate members
Thailand	1	0	1	0	0	3 June 2022	
Qatar	1	1	0	0	0	4 June 2022	4 June 2022
United Arab Emirates	1	0	1	0	0	6 June 2022	
Bhutan	1	1	0	0	0	7 June 2022	7 June 2022
Nepal	1	0	1	0	0	9 June 2022	
