= 2023 Under-19 Women's T20 World Cup =

Cricket tournament

2023 ICC Under-19 Women's T20 World Cup
- Dates: 14 January – 29 January 2023
- Administrator: International Cricket Council
- Cricket format: Limited-overs (20 overs)
- Tournament format(s): Group stage & Knockout
- Host: South Africa
- Champions: India (1st title)
- Runners-up: England
- Participants: 16
- Matches: 41
- Player of the series: (England) Grace Scrivens
- Most runs: (India) Shweta Sehrawat (297)
- Most wickets: (Australia) Maggie Clark (12)
- Official website: ICC U19 Women's T20 World Cup

The 2023 ICC Under-19 Women's T20 World Cup was the first edition of the Under-19 Women's T20 World Cup, hosted by South Africa in 2023. The tournament was moved from its original slot at the end of 2021 to January 2023 because of the COVID-19 pandemic. Sixteen teams competed in the tournament, initially divided into four groups.

India, England, Australia and New Zealand progressed to the semi-finals. In the semi-finals, India beat New Zealand by 8 wickets and England beat Australia by 3 runs. The final took place on 29 January 2023 at Senwes Park, Potchefstroom, and saw India beat England by 7 wickets to become the inaugural champions of the ICC Under-19 Women's T20 World Cup.

== Background ==
Originally, the tournament was scheduled to take place in January 2021, before being postponed multiple times due to the COVID-19 pandemic. In November 2020, the ICC looked at the possibility of deferring the tournament from its scheduled slot of January 2021 to later in the year. In January 2021, the Bangladesh Cricket Board (BCB) confirmed that they would host the tournament in December 2021, however the tournament was postponed for a second time, and was moved to January 2023. In January 2022, Geoff Allardice, the CEO of the ICC said that the tournament was "very much on the cards", and that the ICC were starting the process for hosts.

== Qualification ==
In June 2022, the ICC confirmed the qualification process for the tournament. Hosts South Africa, along with Australia, Bangladesh, England, India, Ireland, New Zealand, Pakistan, Sri Lanka, West Indies and Zimbabwe all qualified automatically for the tournament. The United States also qualified automatically, as they were the only eligible team to compete from the Americas regional group. The four remaining places were to be filled by winners of regional qualification groups. The United Arab Emirates were the first team to qualify from the regional groups, after they won the Asia Qualifier. Indonesia won their three-match series against Papua New Guinea to win the East Asia-Pacific group to qualify. It was the first time that Indonesia had qualified for an ICC World Cup tournament at any level. Rwanda won the African Qualifiers to qualify for the World Cup, the first time that Rwanda had qualified for an ICC World Cup tournament at any level. This was also the first ICC Women's World Cup for Scotland, United Arab Emirates, United States, and Zimbabwe at any level.

Means of qualification	Berths	Qualified
Host nation	1	South Africa
Automatic qualification	11	Australia
Automatic qualification	11	Bangladesh
Automatic qualification	11	England
Automatic qualification	11	India
Automatic qualification	11	Ireland
Automatic qualification	11	New Zealand
Automatic qualification	11	Pakistan
Automatic qualification	11	Sri Lanka
Automatic qualification	11	United States
Automatic qualification	11	West Indies
Automatic qualification	11	Zimbabwe
Regional qualification	4	Indonesia
Regional qualification	4	Rwanda
Regional qualification	4	Scotland
Regional qualification	4	United Arab Emirates
Total	16	

== Competition format ==
The 16 teams were divided into four groups of four, and each played once against every other side in their group. The top three teams in each group progressed to the Super Six League stage, where qualifying teams from Group A played against two of the qualifying teams from Group D, and qualifying teams from Group B played against two of the qualifying teams from Group C. Points from matches against teams that also qualified from the first group stage were carried forward into the Super Six League stage. The top two sides from each of the Super Six Leagues progressed to the semi-finals, with the final taking place on 29 January 2023.

== Squads ==
Each team could select a squad of fifteen players for the tournament, with additional non-travelling reserves also able to be named. England were the first side to name their squad, doing so on 18 October 2022.

== Match officials ==
On 5 January 2023, ICC announced the names of fifteen match officials for the tournament, of whom nine were women – making it the highest number of female match officials to be appointed for any ICC event.

Match Referees

- (Sri Lanka) Vanessa Bowen
- (Zimbabwe) Owen Chirombe
- (Bangladesh) Niamur Rashid

Umpires

- (Cricket West Indies) Maria Abbott
- (England) Sarah Bartlett
- (Zimbabwe) Sarah Dambanevana
- (England) Jasmine Naeem
- (South Africa) Kerrin Klaaste
- (New Zealand) Wayne Knights
- (Cricket West Indies) Candace la Borde
- (Australia) Lisa McCabe
- (Afghanistan) Ahmed Shah Pakteen
- (Bangladesh) Sharfuddoula
- (India) Virender Sharma
- (Sri Lanka) Dedunu Silva

== Venues ==
Potchefstroom	Potchefstroom	Benoni
Absa Puk Oval	Senwes Park	Willowmoore Park
Capacity: 10,000	Capacity: 18,000	Capacity: 20,000

== Warm-up matches ==
The following warm-up matches were played before the tournament's official start:

Matches

4 January 2023
Scorecard

United Arab Emirates; 104/7 (20 overs)	v	Ireland; 105/8 (18.4 overs)

Ireland won by 2 wickets
Tuks Oval B, Pretoria

5 January 2023
Scorecard

Zimbabwe; 74/8 (20 overs)	v	Indonesia; 75/9 (17.3 overs)

Indonesia won by 1 wicket
Tuks Oval B, Pretoria

6 January 2023
Scorecard

Zimbabwe; 102 (18.4 overs)	v	Ireland; 103/6 (19.1 overs)

Ireland won by 4 wickets
Tuks Oval B, Pretoria

6 January 2023
Scorecard

Scotland; 100/9 (18.4 overs)	v	United States; 104/5 (19.1 overs)

USA won by 5 wickets
Steyn City School Oval, Johannesburg

9 January 2023
Scorecard

Scotland; 135/5 (20 overs)	v	United States; 90 (20 overs)

Scotland won by 45 runs
St Stithians College, Johannesburg

9 January 2023
Scorecard

Ireland; 89/6 (20 overs)	v	Pakistan; 91/3 (15.4 overs)

Pakistan won by 7 wickets
Tuks Oval, Pretoria

9 January 2023
Scorecard

Indonesia; 70/9 (20 overs)	v	Zimbabwe; 55 (14.2 overs)

Indonesia won by 15 runs
Hammanskraal Mandela Oval, Pretoria

9 January 2023
Scorecard

India; 97/8 (20 overs)	v	Australia; 79/7 (20 overs)

India win by 18 runs
Steyn City School Oval, Johannesburg

9 January 2023
Scorecard

Sri Lanka; 90/9 (20 overs)	v	United Arab Emirates; 38 (13.3 overs)

Sri Lanka won by 52 runs
St Stithians College, Johannesburg

9 January 2023
Scorecard

New Zealand; 154/5 (20 overs)	v	Rwanda; 91/9 (20 overs)

New Zealand won by 63 runs
Tuks Oval, Pretoria

9 January 2023
Scorecard

West Indies; 65/8 (20 overs)	v	England; 68/1 (10.4 overs)

England won by 9 wickets
Hammanskraal Mandela Oval, Pretoria

9 January 2023
Scorecard

South Africa; 98/9 (20 overs)	v	Bangladesh; 72/4 (14 overs)

Bangladesh won by 6 wickets (D/L)
Steyn City School Oval, Johannesburg

11 January 2023
Scorecard

United States; 122/7 (20 overs)	v	United Arab Emirates; 91/6 (20 overs)

USA won by 31 runs
Steyn City School Oval, Johannesburg

11 January 2023
Scorecard

Bangladesh; 121/7 (20 overs)	v	India; 118/2 (20 overs)

Bangladesh won by 3 runs
St Stithians College, Johannesburg

11 January 2023
Scorecard

Indonesia; 45/9 (20 overs)	v	England; 48/0 (5.1 overs)

England won by 10 wickets
Tuks Oval, Pretoria

11 January 2023
Scorecard

Rwanda; 103/8 (20 overs)	v	Ireland; 102/4 (20 overs)

Rwanda won by 1 run
Hammanskraal Mandela Oval, Pretoria

11 January 2023
Scorecard

South Africa; 61 (15 overs)	v	Australia; 64/2 (10 overs)

Australia won by 8 wickets
St Stithians College, Johannesburg

11 January 2023
Scorecard

Zimbabwe; 71/8 (20 overs)	v	West Indies; 74/4 (12.5 overs)

West Indies won by 6 wickets
Tuks Oval, Pretoria

11 January 2023
Scorecard

Pakistan; 109/5 (20 overs)	v	New Zealand; 110/3 (13 overs)

New Zealand won by 7 wickets
Hammanskraal Mandela Oval, Pretoria

11 January 2023
Scorecard

Scotland; 86 (16.3 overs)	v	Sri Lanka; 91/3 (18.1 overs)

Sri Lanka won by 7 wickets
Steyn City School Oval, Johannesburg

== Group stage ==
=== Group A ===
Pos	Team	Pld	W	L	T	NR	Pts	NRR	Qualification
1	Bangladesh	3	3	0	0	0	6	0.759	Advanced to the Super 6
2	Australia	3	2	1	0	0	4	3.015	Advanced to the Super 6
3	Sri Lanka	3	1	2	0	0	2	−1.814	Advanced to the Super 6
4	United States	3	0	3	0	0	0	−1.572	Advanced to the play-offs

Source: ESPN Cricinfo

14 January 2023
10:00 SAST
Scorecard

Australia; 130/5 (20 overs)	v	Bangladesh; 132/3 (18 overs)
Claire Moore 52 (51); Disha Biswas 2/25 (3 overs)		Dilara Akter 40 (42); Chloe Ainsworth 2/9 (2 overs)

Bangladesh won by 7 wickets
Willowmoore Park, Benoni
Umpires: Sarah Bartlett (Eng) and Wayne Knights (NZ)
Player of the match: Dilara Akter (Ban)

- Australia won the toss and elected to bat.

14 January 2023
13:45 SAST
Scorecard

United States; 96/9 (20 overs)	v	Sri Lanka; 100/3 (19 overs)
Ritu Singh 22 (23); Dewmi Vihanga 3/11 (4 overs)		Vishmi Gunaratne 34* (40); Bhumika Bhadriraju 2/17 (4 overs)

Sri Lanka won by 7 wickets
Willowmoore Park B, Benoni
Umpires: Kerrin Klaaste (SA) and Sharfuddoula (Ban)
Player of the match: Vishmi Gunaratne (SL)

- United States of America won the toss and elected to bat.

16 January 2023
10:00 SAST
Scorecard

Bangladesh; 165/2 (20 overs)	v	Sri Lanka; 155/4 (20 overs)
Afia Prottasha 53 (43); Rashmi Nethranjali 1/30 (4 overs)		Vishmi Gunaratne 60* (54); Marufa Akter 2/19 (4 overs)

Bangladesh won by 10 runs
Willowmoore Park B, Benoni
Umpires: Sarah Bartlett (Eng) and Wayne Knights (NZ)
Player of the match: Afia Prottasha (Ban)

- Sri Lanka won the toss and elected to field.

16 January 2023
13:45 SAST
Scorecard

United States; 64 (15.3 overs)	v	Australia; 65/1 (8.4 overs)
Snigdha Paul 17 (24); Maggie Clark 2/14 (4 overs)		Kate Pelle 30* (26); Snigdha Paul 1/21 (3 overs)

Australia won by 9 wickets
Willowmoore Park B, Benoni
Umpires: Sarah Bartlett (Eng) and Kerrin Klaaste (SA)
Player of the match: Maggie Clark (Aus)

- Australia won the toss and elected to field.

18 January 2023
10:00 SAST
Scorecard

Australia; 159/5 (20 overs)	v	Sri Lanka; 51 (13 overs)
Ella Hayward 36 (31); Rismi Sanjana 2/30 (4 overs)		Nethmi Senarathna 11 (18); Lucy Hamilton 2/0 (1 over)

Australia won by 108 runs
Willowmoore Park, Benoni
Umpires: Maria Abbott (WI) and Sharfuddoula (Ban)
Player of the match: Ella Hayward (Aus)

- Sri Lanka won the toss and elected to field.

18 January 2023
10:00 SAST
Scorecard

United States; 103/4 (20 overs)	v	Bangladesh; 104/5 (17.3 overs)
Snigdha Paul 26 (37); Disha Biswas 2/13 (4 overs)		Shorna Akter 22 (14); Aditiba Chudasama 2/15 (4 overs)

Bangladesh won by 5 wickets
Willowmoore Park B, Benoni
Umpires: Kerrin Klaaste (SA) and Jasmine Naeem (Eng)
Player of the match: Disha Biswas (Ban)

- United States of America won the toss and elected to bat.

=== Group B ===
Pos	Team	Pld	W	L	T	NR	Pts	NRR	Qualification
1	England	3	3	0	0	0	6	6.117	Advanced to the Super 6
2	Pakistan	3	2	1	0	0	4	0.407	Advanced to the Super 6
3	Rwanda	3	1	2	0	0	2	−1.915	Advanced to the Super 6
4	Zimbabwe	3	0	3	0	0	0	−4.890	Advanced to the play-offs

Source: ESPN Cricinfo

15 January 2023
10:00 SAST
Scorecard

Rwanda; 106/7 (20 overs)	v	Pakistan; 108/2 (17.5 overs)
Gisele Ishimwe 40 (49); Areesha Noor 2/19 (4 overs)		Eyman Fatima 65* (60); Henriette Ishimwe 1/12 (3 overs)

Pakistan won by 8 wickets
Senwes Park, Potchefstroom
Umpires: Lisa McCabe (Aus) and Virender Sharma (Ind)
Player of the match: Eyman Fatima (Pak)

- Rwanda won the toss and elected to bat.

15 January 2023
13:45 SAST
Scorecard

England; 199/4 (20 overs)	v	Zimbabwe; 25 (12 overs)
Niamh Holland 59 (37); Olinder Chare 2/34 (4 overs)		Adel Zimunu 5* (9); Grace Scrivens 4/2 (4 overs)

England won by 174 runs
Senwes Park, Potchefstroom
Umpires: Candace la Borde (WI) and Virender Sharma (Ind)
Player of the match: Grace Scrivens (Eng)

- England won the toss and elected to bat.

17 January 2023
10:00 SAST
Scorecard

Rwanda; 119/8 (20 overs)	v	Zimbabwe; 80 (18.4 overs)
Gisele Ishimwe 34 (23); Chipo Moyo 3/22 (3 overs)		Natasha Mtomba 20 (25); Henriette Ishimwe 4/13 (3.4 overs)

Rwanda won by 39 runs
Absa Puk Oval, Potchefstroom
Umpires: Lisa McCabe (Aus) and Virender Sharma (Ind)
Player of the match: Gisele Ishimwe (Rwa)

- Zimbabwe won the toss and elected to field.
- Henriette Ishimwe (Rwa) took four wickets in four balls.

17 January 2023
13:45 SAST
Scorecard

England; 156/7 (20 overs)	v	Pakistan; 103/5 (20 overs)
Seren Smale 37 (33); Anosha Nasir 2/20 (4 overs)		Syeda Aroob Shah 34 (36); Sophia Smale 2/10 (3 overs)

England won by 53 runs
Senwes Park, Potchefstroom
Umpires: Candace la Borde (WI) and Sarah Dambanevana (Zim)
Player of the match: Seren Smale (Eng)

- England won the toss and elected to bat.

19 January 2023
10:00 SAST
Scorecard

England; 183/5 (20 overs)	v	Rwanda; 45 (17 overs)
Liberty Heap 64 (35); Sylvia Usabyimana 3/39 (4 overs)		Henriette Ishimwe 12 (11); Davina Perrin 2/5 (2 overs)

England won by 138 runs
Absa Puk Oval, Potchefstroom
Umpires: Candace la Borde (WI) and Dedunu Silva (SL)
Player of the match: Liberty Heap (Eng)

- England won the toss and elected to bat.

19 January 2023
13:45 SAST
Scorecard

Zimbabwe; 97/6 (20 overs)	v	Pakistan; 100/0 (10.5 overs)
Kelis Ndhlovu 42 (35); Anosha Nasir 2/21 (4 overs)		Eyman Fatima 62* (35)

Pakistan won by 10 wickets
Absa Puk Oval, Potchefstroom
Umpires: Ahmed Shah Pakteen (Afg) and Dedunu Silva (SL)
Player of the match: Eyman Fatima (Pak)

- Zimbabwe won the toss and elected to bat.

=== Group C ===
Pos	Team	Pld	W	L	T	NR	Pts	NRR	Qualification
1	New Zealand	3	3	0	0	0	6	5.865	Advanced to the Super 6
2	West Indies	3	2	1	0	0	4	0.044	Advanced to the Super 6
3	Ireland	3	1	2	0	0	2	−0.755	Advanced to the Super 6
4	Indonesia	3	0	3	0	0	0	−3.596	Advanced to the play-offs

Source: ESPN Cricinfo

15 January 2023
10:00 SAST
Scorecard

West Indies; 125/3 (20 overs)	v	Ireland; 118/7 (20 overs)
Zaida James 52 (57); Freya Sargent 2/9 (4 overs)		Annabel Squires 42 (38); Zaida James 4/19 (4 overs)

West Indies won by 7 runs
Absa Puk Oval, Potchefstroom
Umpires: Sarah Dambanevana (Zim) and Ahmed Shah Pakteen (Afg)
Player of the match: Zaida James (WI)

- Ireland won the toss and elected to field.

15 January 2023
13:45 SAST
Scorecard

Indonesia; 74/7 (20 overs)	v	New Zealand; 77/0 (9.3 overs)
Desi Wulandari 16* (35); Tash Wakelin 3/14 (4 overs)		Anna Browning 38* (36)

New Zealand won by 10 wickets
Absa Puk Oval, Potchefstroom
Umpires: Ahmed Shah Pakteen (Afg) and Dedunu Silva (SL)
Player of the match: Anna Browning (NZ)

- Indonesia won the toss and elected to bat.

17 January 2023
10:00 SAST
Scorecard

Ireland; 74 (18.1 overs)	v	New Zealand; 75/1 (6.5 overs)
Zara Craig 20 (28); Natasha Codyre 3/6 (3 overs)		Anna Browning 29 (14); Georgina Dempsey 1/27 (3 overs)

New Zealand won by 9 wickets
Senwes Park, Potchefstroom
Umpires: Candace la Borde (WI) and Ahmed Shah Pakteen (Afg)
Player of the match: Natasha Codyre (NZ)

- Ireland won the toss and elected to bat.

17 January 2023
13:45 SAST
Scorecard

West Indies; 177/3 (20 overs)	v	Indonesia; 99/9 (20 overs)
Zaida James 55 (37); Ni Suarniasih 1/22 (3 overs)		Kadek Kurniartini 15 (23); Djenaba Joseph 3/14 (4 overs)

West Indies won by 77 runs
Absa Puk Oval, Potchefstroom
Umpires: Lisa McCabe (Aus) and Dedunu Silva (SL)
Player of the match: Zaida James (WI)

- West Indies won the toss and elected to bat.

19 January 2023
10:00 SAST
Scorecard

Ireland; 156/5 (20 overs)	v	Indonesia; 107/8 (20 overs)
Zara Craig 52 (45); Ni Kadek Ariani 3/30 (4 overs)		Ni Luh Dewi 34 (40); Zara Craig 2/4 (2 overs)

Ireland won by 49 runs
Senwes Park, Potchefstroom
Umpires: Sarah Dambanevana (Zim) and Virender Sharma (Ind)
Player of the match: Georgina Dempsey (Ire)

- Ireland won the toss and elected to bat.

19 January 2023
13:45 SAST
Scorecard

West Indies; 68 (19.2 overs)	v	New Zealand; 72/0 (7.2 overs)
Earnisha Fontaine 11* (17); Kate Chandler 3/8 (4 overs)		Georgia Plimmer 41* (22)

New Zealand won by 10 wickets
Senwes Park, Potchefstroom
Umpires: Sarah Dambanevana (Zim) and Lisa McCabe (Aus)
Player of the match: Kate Chandler (NZ)

- New Zealand won the toss and elected to bowl.

=== Group D ===
Pos	Team	Pld	W	L	T	NR	Pts	NRR	Qualification
1	India	3	3	0	0	0	6	4.039	Advanced to the Super 6
2	South Africa (H)	3	2	1	0	0	4	1.102	Advanced to the Super 6
3	United Arab Emirates	3	1	2	0	0	2	−2.480	Advanced to the Super 6
4	Scotland	3	0	3	0	0	0	−2.525	Advanced to the play-offs

Source: ESPN Cricinfo
(H) Host

14 January 2023
10:00 SAST
Scorecard

Scotland; 99/9 (20 overs)	v	United Arab Emirates; 100/4 (16.2 overs)
Emma Walsingham 37 (33); Vaishnave Mahesh 2/19 (4 overs)		Mahika Gaur 33* (25); Maisie Maceira 2/7 (2 overs)

United Arab Emirates won by 6 wickets
Willowmoore Park B, Benoni
Umpires: Jasmine Naeem (Eng) and Sharfuddoula (Ban)
Player of the match: Samaira Dharnidharka (UAE)

- United Arab Emirates won the toss and elected to field.

14 January 2023
13:45 SAST
Scorecard

South Africa; 166/5 (20 overs)	v	India; 170/3 (16.3 overs)
Simone Lourens 61 (44); Shafali Verma 2/31 (4 overs)		Shweta Sehrawat 92* (57); Miané Smit 1/15 (2 overs)

India won by 7 wickets
Willowmoore Park, Benoni
Umpires: Maria Abbott (WI) and Wayne Knights (Nzl)
Player of the match: Shweta Sehrawat (Ind)

- South Africa won the toss and elected to field.

16 January 2023
10:00 SAST
Scorecard

India; 219/3 (20 overs)	v	United Arab Emirates; 97/5 (20 overs)
Shafali Verma 78 (34); Samaira Dharnidharka 1/33 (4 overs)		Mahika Gaur 26 (26); Parshavi Chopra 1/13 (3 overs)

India won by 122 runs
Willowmoore Park, Benoni
Umpires: Jasmine Naeem (Eng) and Sharfuddoula (Ban)
Player of the match: Shafali Verma (Ind)

- United Arab Emirates won the toss and elected to field.

16 January 2023
13:45 SAST
Scorecard

South Africa; 112/7 (20 overs)	v	Scotland; 68 (17 overs)
Kayla Reyneke 53 (49); Katherine Fraser 3/25 (4 overs)		Emma Walsingham 17 (18); Madison Landsman 4/16 (4 overs)

South Africa won by 44 runs
Willowmoore Park, Benoni
Umpires: Maria Abbott (WI) and Jasmine Naeem (Eng)
Player of the match: Kayla Reyneke (SA)

- Scotland won the toss and elected to field.
- Madison Landsman (SA) took the first-ever hat-trick in U19 Women's T20 World Cup history.

18 January 2023
13:45 SAST
Scorecard

South Africa; 112/7 (20 overs)	v	United Arab Emirates; 67 (17 overs)
Simone Lourens 27 (29); Lavanya Keny 2/10 (4 overs)		Samaira Dharnidharka 13 (18); Miané Smit 4/11 (4 overs)

South Africa won by 45 runs
Willowmoore Park, Benoni
Umpires: Maria Abbott (WI) and Sarah Bartlett (Eng)
Player of the match: Miané Smit (SA)

- United Arab Emirates won the toss and elected to field.

18 January 2023
13:45 SAST
Scorecard

India; 149/4 (20 overs)	v	Scotland; 66 (13.1 overs)
Gongadi Trisha 57 (51); Katherine Fraser 2/31 (4 overs)		Darcey Carter 24 (22); Mannat Kashyap 4/12 (4 overs)

India won by 83 runs
Willowmoore Park B, Benoni
Umpires: Kerrin Klaaste (SA) and Wayne Knights (NZ)
Player of the match: Mannat Kashyap (Ind)

- India won the toss and elected to bat.

== 13th to 16th Place play-offs ==
20 January 2023
10:00 SAST
Scorecard

United States; 147/7 (20 overs)	v	Scotland; 148/5 (19.4 overs)
Laasya Mullapudi 43 (33); Katherine Fraser 3/23 (4 overs)		Katherine Fraser 59 (47); Aditiba Chudasama 2/20 (4 overs)

Scotland won by 5 wickets
Willowmoore Park, Benoni
Umpires: Jasmine Naeem (Eng) and Sharfuddoula (Ban)
Player of the match: Katherine Fraser (Sco)

- United States won the toss and elected to bat.

20 January 2023
13:45 SAST
Scorecard

Zimbabwe; 86/8 (20 overs)	v	Indonesia; 87/7 (18 overs)
Tawananyasha Marumani 20 (19); Danielle Meikle 20 (19); Ni Luh Dewi 5/18 (4 overs)		Ni Luh Dewi 14 (13); Kelis Ndhlovu 3/8 (4 overs)

Indonesia won by 3 wickets
Willowmoore Park, Benoni
Umpires: Sarah Bartlett (Eng) and Sharfuddoula (Ban)
Player of the match: Ni Luh Dewi (Ina)

- Zimbabwe won the toss and elected to bat.

== Super 6 ==
=== Group 1 ===
Pos	Team	Pld	W	L	T	NR	Pts	NRR	Qualification
1	India	4	3	1	0	0	6	2.844	Advanced to the semi-finals
2	Australia	4	3	1	0	0	6	2.210	Advanced to the semi-finals
3	Bangladesh	4	3	1	0	0	6	1.211	
4	South Africa (H)	4	3	1	0	0	6	0.387	
5	Sri Lanka	4	0	4	0	0	0	−2.178	
6	United Arab Emirates	4	0	4	0	0	0	−3.724	

Source: International Cricket Council
(H) Host

21 January 2023
13:45 SAST
Scorecard

India; 87 (18.5 overs)	v	Australia; 88/3 (13.5 overs)
Shweta Sehrawat 21 (29); Sianna Ginger 3/13 (4 overs)		Amy Smith 26 (25); Archana Devi 1/7 (2 overs)

Australia won by 7 wickets
Absa Puk Oval, Potchefstroom
Umpires: Maria Abbott (WI) and Ahmed Shah Pakteen (Afg)
Player of the match: Milly Illingworth (Aus)

- Australia won the toss and elected to field.

21 January 2023
13:45 SAST
Scorecard

Bangladesh; 105/6 (20 overs)	v	South Africa; 108/5 (18.5 overs)
Sumaiya Akter 24 (28); Kayla Reyneke 4/19 (4 overs)		Madison Landsman 37 (38); Rabeya Khan 3/18 (4 overs)

South Africa won by 5 wickets
Senwes Park, Potchefstroom
Umpires: Wayne Knights (NZ) and Lisa McCabe (Aus)
Player of the match: Kayla Reyneke (SA)

- Bangladesh won the toss and elected to bat.

22 January 2023
13:45 SAST
Scorecard

Sri Lanka; 59/9 (20 overs)	v	India; 60/3 (7.2 overs)
Vishmi Gunaratne 25 (28); Parshavi Chopra 4/5 (4 overs)		Soumya Tiwari 28 (15); Dewmi Vihanga 3/34 (4 overs)

India won by 7 wickets
Senwes Park, Potchefstroom
Umpires: Sarah Dambanevana (Zim) and Sharfuddoula (Ban)
Player of the match: Parshavi Chopra (Ind)

- India won the toss and elected to field.

23 January 2023
13:45 SAST
Scorecard

United Arab Emirates; 107/8 (20 overs)	v	Australia; 109/4 (15.1 overs)
Theertha Satish 58 (48); Maggie Clark 3/20 (4 overs)		Kate Pelle 51 (36); Lavanya Keny 2/23 (4 overs)

Australia won by 6 wickets
Senwes Park, Potchefstroom
Umpires: Wayne Knights (NZ) and Jasmine Naeem (Eng)
Player of the match: Kate Pelle (Aus)

- Australia won the toss and elected to field.

24 January 2023
13:45 SAST
Scorecard

South Africa; 134/7 (20 overs)	v	Sri Lanka; 133/8 (20 overs)
Kayla Reyneke 43 (49); Vidushika Perera 3/25 (4 overs)		Dewmi Vihanga 37 (23); Kayla Reyneke 2/16 (4 overs)

South Africa won by 1 run
Absa Puk Oval, Potchefstroom
Umpires: Maria Abbott (WI) and Ahmed Shah Pakteen (Afg)
Player of the match: Kayla Reyneke (SA)

- South Africa won the toss and elected to bat.

25 January 2023
13:45 SAST
Scorecard

United Arab Emirates; 69/9 (20 overs)	v	Bangladesh; 73/5 (9.1 overs)
Lavanya Keny 29 (46); Rabeya Khan 3/14 (4 overs)		Shorna Akter 38 (19); Indhuja Nandakumar 2/34 (3 overs)

Bangladesh won by 5 wickets
Absa Puk Oval, Potchefstroom
Umpires: Candace la Borde (WI) and Kerrin Klaaste (SA)
Player of the match: Shorna Akter (Ban)

- United Arab Emirates won the toss and elected to bat.

=== Group 2 ===
Pos	Team	Pld	W	L	T	NR	Pts	NRR	Qualification
1	England	4	4	0	0	0	8	5.088	Advanced to the semi-finals
2	New Zealand	4	4	0	0	0	8	4.524	Advanced to the semi-finals
3	Pakistan	4	2	2	0	0	4	−1.563	
4	Rwanda	4	1	3	0	0	2	−2.169	
5	West Indies	4	1	3	0	0	2	−2.363	
6	Ireland	4	0	4	0	0	0	−3.258	

Source: International Cricket Council

21 January 2023
10:00 SAST
Scorecard

Rwanda; 96/7 (20 overs)	v	New Zealand; 99/6 (16.1 overs)
Henriette Ishimwe 30 (46); Kate Chandler 2/21 (4 overs)		Emma McLeod 59 (39); Rosine Irera 3/21 (3.1 overs)

New Zealand won by 4 wickets
Absa Puk Oval, Potchefstroom
Umpires: Kerrin Klaaste (SA) and Virender Sharma (Ind)
Player of the match: Emma McLeod (NZ)

- Rwanda won the toss and elected to bat.

21 January 2023
10:00 SAST
Scorecard

England; 207/2 (20 overs)	v	Ireland; 86 (16.5 overs)
Grace Scrivens 93 (56); Aimee Maguire 1/24 (3 overs)		Abbi Harrison 16 (23); Hannah Baker 3/9 (2.5 overs)

England won by 121 runs
Senwes Park, Potchefstroom
Umpires: Candace la Borde (WI) and Wayne Knights (NZ)
Player of the match: Grace Scrivens (Eng)

- England won the toss and elected to bat.

22 January 2023
13:45 SAST
Scorecard

West Indies; 70 (16.3 overs)	v	Rwanda; 71/6 (18.2 overs)
Realeanna Grimmond 18 (21); Marie Josee Tumukunde 4/8 (3.3 overs)		Gisele Ishimwe 31* (53); Ashmini Munisar 1/8 (4 overs)

Rwanda won by 4 wickets
Absa Puk Oval, Potchefstroom
Umpires: Sarah Bartlett (Eng) and Ahmed Shah Pakteen (Afg)
Player of the match: Gisele Ishimwe (Rwa)

- West Indies won the toss and elected to bat.

23 January 2023
13:45 SAST
Scorecard

Ireland; 113/7 (20 overs)	v	Pakistan; 117/3 (17.3 overs)
Annabel Squires 55 (52); Anosha Nasir 2/17 (4 overs)		Syeda Aroob Shah 35 (25); Zara Craig 1/17 (3.3 overs)

Pakistan won by 7 wickets
Absa Puk Oval, Potchefstroom
Umpires: Lisa McCabe (Aus) and Virender Sharma (Ind)
Player of the match: Anosha Nasir (Pak)

- Ireland won the toss and elected to bat.

24 January 2023
13:45 SAST
Scorecard

New Zealand; 178/7 (20 overs)	v	Pakistan; 75/7 (20 overs)
Georgia Plimmer 53 (38); Anosha Nasir 3/32 (4 overs)		Areesha Noor Bhatti 24 (39); Natasha Codyre 2/14 (3 overs)

New Zealand won by 103 runs
Senwes Park, Potchefstroom
Umpires: Sarah Dambanevana (Zim) and Dedunu Silva (SL)
Player of the match: Georgia Plimmer (NZ)

- Pakistan won the toss and elected to field.

25 January 2023
13:45 SAST
Scorecard

England; 179/4 (20 overs)	v	West Indies; 84/8 (20 overs)
Grace Scrivens 56 (43); Ashmini Munisar 2/32 (4 overs)		Djenaba Joseph 44* (42); Ellie Anderson 5/12 (4 overs)

England won by 95 runs
Senwes Park, Potchefstroom
Umpires: Virender Sharma (Ind) and Dedunu Silva (SL)
Player of the match: Ellie Anderson (Eng)

- England won the toss and elected to bat.

== Knockout stage ==
Semifinals
India	110/2 (14.2 overs)
New Zealand	107/9 (20 overs)
England	99 (19.5 overs)
Australia	96 (18.4 overs)

Final
India	69/3 (14 overs)
England	68 (17.1 overs)

=== Semi-finals ===
27 January 2023
10:00 SAST
Scorecard

New Zealand; 107/9 (20 overs)	v	India; 110/2 (14.2 overs)
Georgia Plimmer 35 (32); Parshavi Chopra 3/20 (4 overs)		Shweta Sehrawat 61* (45); Anna Browning 2/18 (3.2 overs)

India won by 8 wickets
Senwes Park, Potchefstroom
Umpires: Sara Bartlett (Eng) and Lisa McCabe (Aus)
Player of the match: Parshavi Chopra (Ind)

- India won the toss and elected to field.

27 January 2023
13:45 SAST
Scorecard

England; 99 (19.5 overs)	v	Australia; 96 (18.4 overs)
Alexa Stonehouse 25 (33); Sianna Ginger 3/13 (4 overs)		Amy Smith 26 (26); Hannah Baker 3/10 (4 overs)

England won by 3 runs
Senwes Park, Potchefstroom
Umpires: Candace la Borde (WI) and Sarah Dambanevana (Zim)
Player of the match: Hannah Baker (Eng)

- England won the toss and elected to bat.

=== Final ===
29 January 2023
13:45 SAST
Scorecard

England; 68 (17.1 overs)	v	India; 69/3 (14 overs)
Ryana MacDonald-Gay 19 (24); Titas Sadhu 2/6 (4 overs)		Gongadi Trisha 24 (29); Alexa Stonehouse 1/8 (2 overs)

India won by 7 wickets
Senwes Park, Potchefstroom
Umpires: Candace la Borde (WI) and Sarah Dambanevana (Zim)
Player of the match: Titas Sadhu (Ind)

- India won the toss and elected to field.

== Final standings ==
Pos.	Team
1st	India
2nd	England
3rd	New Zealand
4th	Australia
5th	Bangladesh
6th	South Africa
7th	Pakistan
8th	Rwanda
9th	West Indies
10th	Sri Lanka
11th	Ireland
12th	United Arab Emirates
13th	Scotland
14th	United States
15th	Indonesia
16th	Zimbabwe

== Statistics ==
- Highest score by a team: India – 219/3 (20 overs) v United Arab Emirates (16 January).
- Top score by an individual: Grace Scrivens (England) – 93 (56) v Ireland (21 January).
- Best bowling figures by an individual: Ellie Anderson (England) – 5/12 (4 overs) v West Indies (25 January).

=== Most runs ===
Player	Team	Matches	Innings	Runs	Average	HS	100s	50s
Shweta Sehrawat	India	7	7	297	99.00	92*	0	3
Grace Scrivens	England	7	7	293	41.85	93	0	3
Shafali Verma	India	7	7	172	24.57	78	0	1
Eyman Fatima	Pakistan	5	5	157	52.33	65*	0	2
Georgia Plimmer	New Zealand	6	5	155	51.66	53	0	1

Source: ESPNcricinfo

=== Most wickets ===
Player	Team	Overs	Wickets	Average	BBI	5w
Maggie Clark	Australia	17.5	12	6.25	3/15	0
Parshavi Chopra	India	21.0	11	7.00	4/5	0
Hannah Baker	England	21.5	10	7.30	3/9	0
Anosha Nasir	Pakistan	20.0	10	11.00	3/32	0
Grace Scrivens	England	20.4	9	7.11	4/2	0

Source: ESPNcricinfo

=== Team of the tournament ===
On 30 January 2023, the ICC announced the Team of the Tournament. Grace Scrivens was also named Player of the Tournament.

- (India) Shweta Sehrawat
- (England) Grace Scrivens (c)
- (India) Shafali Verma
- (New Zealand) Georgia Plimmer
- (Sri Lanka) Dewmi Vihanga
- (Bangladesh) Shorna Akter
- (South Africa) Karabo Meso (wk)
- (India) Parshavi Chopra
- (England) Hannah Baker
- (England) Ellie Anderson
- (Australia) Maggie Clark
- (Pakistan) Anosha Nasir (12th woman)
